= 2024 Northern Diamonds season =

English cricket season

Northern Diamonds
2024 season
- Coach: Danielle Hazell
- Captain: Hollie Armitage
- Overseas player: (Australia) Erin Burns
- RHFT: Semi-finals
- CEC: 6th
- Most runs: RHFT: Hollie Armitage (435); CEC: Hollie Armitage (323)
- Most wickets: RHFT: Phoebe Turner (23); CEC: Erin Burns (16)
- Most catches: RHFT: Erin Burns (7); CEC: Hollie Armitage (6)
- Most wicket-keeping dismissals: RHFT: Lauren Winfield-Hill (13); CEC: Bess Heath (7)

The 2024 season was Northern Diamonds' fifth season, in which they competed in the 50 over Rachael Heyhoe Flint Trophy and the Twenty20 Charlotte Edwards Cup. In the Charlotte Edwards Cup, the side won three of their ten matches, finishing sixth in the group. In the Rachael Heyhoe Flint Trophy, the side finished won nine of their fourteen group stage matches to finish top of the group, before losing to Sunrisers in the semi-finals.

The side was captained by Hollie Armitage and coached by Danielle Hazell. They played six home matches at Headingley Cricket Ground, four at the Riverside Ground, two at North Marine Road Ground and one at Clifton Park Ground.

This was Northern Diamonds' final season in existence, effectively being replaced by a professionalised Durham team under the England and Wales Cricket Board's changes to the structure of women's domestic cricket from 2025 onwards.

== Squad ==
=== Departures ===
On 19 December 2023, it was announced that Yvonne Graves had left the side.

=== Arrivals ===
On 21 November 2023, it was announced that the side had signed Sophia Turner from North West Thunder. Turner had previously been on loan to the side in September 2023. On 10 April 2024, it was announced that the side had signed Erin Burns as an overseas player from the start of the season until the end of July. On 30 April 2024, Maddie Ward was included in a matchday squad for the first time. On 29 August 2024, it was announced that Erin Burns had returned to the side for the remainder of the season.

=== Personnel and contract changes ===
On 19 December 2023, it was announced that Lizzie Scott had signed her first professional contract with the side.

=== Squad list ===
- Age given is at the start of Northern Diamonds' first match of the season (20 April 2024).

Name	Nationality	Birth date	Batting Style	Bowling Style	Notes
Batters
Leah Dobson	England	6 October 2001 (aged 22)	Right-handed	Right arm medium	
Rebecca Duckworth	England	30 October 2000 (aged 23)	Right-handed	Right arm medium	
Sterre Kalis	Netherlands	30 August 1999 (aged 24)	Right-handed	Right-arm medium	
Phoebe Turner	England	8 August 2003 (aged 20)	Right-handed	Right-arm medium	
All-rounders
Hollie Armitage	England	14 June 1997 (aged 26)	Right-handed	Right-arm leg break	Captain
Erin Burns	Australia	22 June 1988 (aged 35)	Right-handed	Right-arm off break	Overseas player; April to July, September 2024
Katherine Fraser	Scotland	9 April 2005 (aged 18)	Right-handed	Right-arm off break	
Abigail Glen	England	2 April 2001 (aged 23)	Right-handed	Right-arm medium	
Emma Marlow	England	12 April 2004 (aged 20)	Right-handed	Right-arm off break	
Wicket-keepers
Bess Heath	England	20 August 2001 (aged 22)	Right-handed	—	
Maddie Ward	England	19 January 2005 (aged 19)	Right-handed	—	Joined April 2024
Lauren Winfield-Hill	England	16 August 1990 (aged 33)	Right-handed	Right-arm medium	
Bowlers
Grace Hall	England	24 December 2002 (aged 21)	Right-handed	Right-arm medium	
Beth Langston	England	6 September 1992 (aged 31)	Right-handed	Right-arm medium	
Katie Levick	England	17 July 1991 (aged 32)	Right-handed	Right-arm leg break	
Lizzie Scott	England	1 September 2004 (aged 19)	Right-handed	Right-arm medium	
Rachel Slater	Scotland	20 November 2001 (aged 22)	Right-handed	Left-arm medium	
Sophia Turner	England	23 April 2003 (aged 20)	Right-handed	Right-arm medium	
Jessica Woolston	England	25 February 2003 (aged 21)	Right-handed	Right-arm medium	

== Rachael Heyhoe Flint Trophy ==
=== Season standings ===
Pos	Team	Pld	W	L	T	NR	BP	Pts	NRR
1	Northern Diamonds (Q)	14	9	4	0	1	3	41	0.097
2	South East Stars (Q)	14	9	5	0	0	4	40	0.246
3	Southern Vipers (Q)	14	7	6	0	1	4	34	0.534
4	Sunrisers (Q)	14	7	6	0	1	4	34	−0.122
5	The Blaze	14	7	6	0	1	1	31	−0.176
6	North West Thunder	14	5	8	0	1	3	25	−0.013
7	Central Sparks	14	5	8	0	1	3	25	−0.299
8	Western Storm	14	4	10	0	0	2	18	−0.211

Source: ESPNCricinfo

advanced to the Semi-finals

=== Fixtures ===
20 April 2024
10:30
Scorecard

North West Thunder; 165 (43.1 overs)	v	Northern Diamonds; 166/1 (34.3 overs)
Seren Smale 32 (49); Katie Levick 4/38 (9.1 overs)		Lauren Winfield-Hill 69* (92); Hannah Jones 1/34 (7.3 overs)

Northern Diamonds won by 9 wickets
Riverside Ground, Chester-le-Street
Umpires: Jasmine Naeem and Simon Widdup

- Northern Diamonds won the toss and elected to bowl.
- Points: Northern Diamonds 5, North West Thunder 0

24 April 2024
10:30
Scorecard

Northern Diamonds; 275/9 (50 overs)	v	Western Storm; 265 (49.2 overs)
Hollie Armitage 103 (114); Amanda-Jade Wellington 3/30 (10 overs)		Sophia Smale 35 (49); Abigail Glen 3/42 (8.2 overs)

Northern Diamonds won by 10 runs
Headingley Cricket Ground, Leeds
Umpires: Chris Watts and Gabi Brown

- Western Storm won the toss and elected to bowl.
- Points: Northern Diamonds 4, Western Storm 0

27 April 2024
10:30
Scorecard

Southern Vipers; 287/9 (50 overs)	v	Northern Diamonds; 162/7 (30 overs)
Ella McCaughan 83 (97); Phoebe Turner 3/48 (10 overs)		Lauren Winfield-Hill 63 (62); Charlie Dean 4/34 (8 overs)

Southern Vipers won by 70 runs (DLS)
Rose Bowl, Southampton
Umpires: Ben Peverall and Rose Dovey

- Northern Diamonds won the toss and elected to bowl.
- Northern Diamonds innings curtailed at 30 overs due to rain; target was 233.
- Points: Southern Vipers 5, Northern Diamonds 0

1 May 2024
10:30
Scorecard

Northern Diamonds; 188 (47.4 overs)	v	The Blaze; 189/8 (49.4 overs)
Leah Dobson 54 (85); Sophie Munro 3/28 (8.4 overs)		Bethan Gammon 39 (52); Erin Burns 3/40 (10 overs)

The Blaze won by 2 wickets
North Marine Road Ground, Scarborough
Umpires: Amy Clark and Sue Redfern

- Northern Diamonds won the toss and elected to bat.
- Points: The Blaze 4, Northern Diamonds 0

4 May 2024
10:30
Scorecard

Northern Diamonds; 216 (49.2 overs)	v	Central Sparks; 215 (50 overs)
Erin Burns 49 (63); Ria Fackrell 2/19 (6 overs)		Evelyn Jones 65 (98); Hollie Armitage 3/40 (7 overs)

Northern Diamonds won by 1 run
Edgbaston Cricket Ground, Birmingham
Umpires: Grace Bambury and Anthony Harris

- Northern Diamonds won the toss and elected to bat.
- Points: Northern Diamonds 4, Central Sparks 0

8 May 2024
10:30
Scorecard

Northern Diamonds; 311/9 (50 overs)	v	South East Stars; 308/9 (50 overs)
Hollie Armitage 66 (70); Phoebe Franklin 3/49 (10 overs)		Sophia Dunkley 130 (136); Erin Burns 2/62 (10 overs)

Northern Diamonds won by 3 runs
County Ground, Beckenham
Umpires: Julia Jarvis and Surendiran Shanmugam

- Northern Diamonds won the toss and elected to bat.
- Points: Northern Diamonds 4, South East Stars 0

30 June 2024
10:30
Scorecard

Central Sparks; 239/8 (50 overs)	v	Northern Diamonds; 242/6 (44 overs)
Katie George 50 (69); Katie Levick 4/46 (10 overs)		Bess Heath 58* (53); Grace Potts 2/34 (5 overs)

Northern Diamonds won by 4 wickets
North Marine Road Ground, Scarborough
Umpires: Gabi Brown and James Middlebrook

- Central Sparks won the toss and elected to bat.
- Points: Northern Diamonds 4, Central Sparks 0

7 July 2024
10:30
Scorecard

Western Storm; 200/5 (30 overs)	v	Northern Diamonds; 199/4 (26.4 overs)
Fran Wilson 61* (63); Abigail Glen 2/24 (6 overs)		Hollie Armitage 101* (76); Ellie Anderson 1/22 (2.4 overs)

Northern Diamonds won by 6 wickets (DLS)
College Ground, Cheltenham
Umpires: Paul Pollard and Sophie McLelland

- Northern Diamonds won the toss and elected to bowl.
- Western Storm innings reduced to 30 overs due to rain.
- Northern Diamonds innings reduced to 29 overs due to rain; target was 199.
- Points: Northern Diamonds 4, Western Storm 0

10 July 2024
10:30
Scorecard

Sunrisers; 109 (30.5 overs)	v	Northern Diamonds; 111/6 (24.4 overs)
Jo Gardner 21 (27); Beth Langston 6/24 (10 overs)		Erin Burns 35* (36); Kate Coppack 3/35 (7 overs)

Northern Diamonds won by 4 wickets
Clifton Park, York
Umpires: Jasmine Naeem and Peter Hartley

- Northern Diamonds won the toss and elected to bowl.
- Points: Northern Diamonds 5, Sunrisers 0

14 July 2024
10:30
Scorecard

Northern Diamonds; 188/8 (26 overs)	v	The Blaze
Bess Heath 61 (45); Grace Ballinger 3/43 (6 overs)

No result
Lindum Sports Club Ground, Lincoln
Umpires: Naeem Ashraf and Sophie McLelland

- The Blaze won the toss and elected to bowl.
- Match reduced to 30 overs per side due to rain.
- No further play possible due to rain.
- Points: The Blaze 2, Northern Diamonds 2

26 August 2024
10:30
Scorecard

Northern Diamonds; 188/9 (50 overs)	v	Sunrisers; 189/7 (38 overs)
Sterre Kalis 36 (41); Mady Villiers 4/36 (10 overs)		Grace Scrivens 56 (74); Katherine Fraser 3/37 (8 overs)

Sunrisers won by 3 wickets
County Ground, Chelmsford
Umpires: Chris Watts and Jasmine Naeem

- Northern Diamonds won the toss and elected to bat.
- Points: Sunrisers 5, Northern Diamonds 0

1 September 2024
10:30
Scorecard

Northern Diamonds; 290/6 (50 overs)	v	North West Thunder; 204 (38 overs)
Sterre Kalis 100 (95); Hannah Jones 2/37 (10 overs)		Evelyn Jones 57 (76); Phoebe Turner 6/20 (9 overs)

Northern Diamonds won by 86 runs
Trafalgar Road Ground, Southport
Umpires: Jasmine Naeem and Naeem Ashraf

- North West Thunder won the toss and elected to bowl.
- Points: Northern Diamonds 5, North West Thunder 0

4 September 2024
10:30
Scorecard

Southern Vipers; 240/8 (50 overs)	v	Northern Diamonds; 241/9 (50 overs)
Georgia Adams 57 (82); Katie Levick 3/36 (10 overs)		Emma Marlow 52 (84); Georgia Adams 4/30 (10 overs)

Northern Diamonds won by 1 wicket
Headingley Cricket Ground, Leeds
Umpires: Jasmine Naeem and Sue Redfern

- Southern Vipers won the toss and elected to bat.
- Points: Northern Diamonds 4, Southern Vipers 0

7 September 2024
10:30
Scorecard

South East Stars; 275/8 (50 overs)	v	Northern Diamonds; 119 (36.1 overs)
Alice Davidson-Richards 79 (79); Beth Langston 2/44 (10 overs)		Phoebe Turner 49* (78); Alexa Stonehouse 4/27 (10 overs)

South East Stars won by 156 runs
Riverside Ground, Chester-le-Street
Umpires: Joanne Ibbotson and Tom Lungley

- Northern Diamonds won the toss and elected to bowl.
- Points: South East Stars 5, Northern Diamonds 0

==== Semi-final ====
14 September 2024
10:30
Scorecard

Northern Diamonds; 232/8 (50 overs)	v	Sunrisers; 234/3 (43.4 overs)
Emma Marlow 63 (102); Eva Gray 2/52 (10 overs)		Cordelia Griffith 68 (89); Katie Levick 2/45 (9 overs)

Sunrisers won by 7 wickets
Headingley Cricket Ground, Leeds
Umpires: Chris Watts and Rose Dovey

- Northern Diamonds won the toss and elected to bat.

=== Tournament statistics ===
==== Batting ====
Player	Matches	Innings	Runs	Average	High score	100s	50s
Hollie Armitage	12	12	435	43.50	103	2	2
Emma Marlow	13	13	397	30.53	63	0	3
Lauren Winfield-Hill	14	14	361	27.76	69*	0	3
Sterre Kalis	12	12	320	26.66	100	1	1
Erin Burns	14	13	307	27.90	49	0	0
Bess Heath	8	7	227	37.83	63	0	3

Source: ESPN Cricinfo Qualification: 200 runs.

==== Bowling ====
Player	Matches	Overs	Wickets	Average	Economy	BBI	5wi
Phoebe Turner	15	110.0	23	23.39	4.89	6/20	1
Katie Levick	15	121.1	20	25.65	4.23	4/38	0
Erin Burns	14	108.5	15	34.60	4.76	3/40	0
Beth Langston	6	40.0	11	17.45	4.80	6/24	1

Source: ESPN Cricinfo Qualification: 10 wickets.

== Charlotte Edwards Cup ==
=== Season standings ===
Pos	Team	Pld	W	L	T	NR	BP	Pts	NRR
1	The Blaze (Q)	10	9	1	0	0	3	39	0.606
2	South East Stars (Q)	10	7	2	0	1	4	34	0.309
3	Southern Vipers (Q)	10	6	4	0	0	2	26	1.001
4	Central Sparks (Q)	10	6	4	0	0	2	26	0.402
5	North West Thunder	10	3	6	0	1	1	15	−0.727
6	Northern Diamonds	10	3	7	0	0	1	13	−0.067
7	Western Storm	10	2	6	0	2	1	13	−0.659
8	Sunrisers	10	2	8	0	0	0	8	−1.073

Source: ESPNCricinfo

advanced to the Semi-finals

=== Fixtures ===
19 May 2024
13:00
Scorecard

Northern Diamonds; 109/5 (20 overs)	v	North West Thunder; 112/2 (14.5 overs)
Emma Marlow 47* (53); Mahika Gaur 1/11 (4 overs)		Emma Lamb 44* (43); Katie Levick 1/33 (4 overs)

North West Thunder won by 8 wickets
Old Trafford Cricket Ground, Manchester
Umpires: Amy Clark and Paul Pollard

- Northern Diamonds won the toss and elected to bat.
- Points: North West Thunder 5, Northern Diamonds 0

23 May 2024
18:30
Scorecard

The Blaze; 136 (20 overs)	v	Northern Diamonds; 132/7 (20 overs)
Kathryn Bryce 31 (29); Erin Burns 5/25 (4 overs)		Lauren Winfield-Hill 38 (37); Kirstie Gordon 3/20 (4 overs)

The Blaze won by 4 runs
Trent Bridge, Nottingham
Umpires: Amy Clark and Simon Widdup

- Northern Diamonds won the toss and elected to bowl.
- Points: The Blaze 4, Northern Diamonds 0

27 May 2024
14:30
Scorecard

Northern Diamonds; 80/9 (11 overs)	v	Central Sparks; 81/7 (11 overs)
Erin Burns 30 (18); Grace Potts 3/15 (2 overs)		Evelyn Jones 26* (18); Rachel Slater 2/10 (2 overs)

Central Sparks won by 3 wickets
Headingley Cricket Ground, Leeds
Umpires: Amy Clark and Simon Widdup

- Central Sparks won the toss and elected to bowl.
- Match reduced to 11 overs per side due to rain.
- Points: Central Sparks 4, Northern Diamonds 0

31 May 2024
14:30
Scorecard

Northern Diamonds; 124 (19.3 overs)	v	South East Stars; 127/4 (16 overs)
Leah Dobson 55 (46); Matilda Corteen-Coleman 5/19 (3.3 overs)		Bryony Smith 57 (41); Hollie Armitage 2/22 (3 overs)

South East Stars won by 6 wickets
Riverside Ground, Chester-le-Street
Umpires: Jasmine Naeem and Naeem Ashraf

- Northern Diamonds won the toss and elected to bat.
- Matilda Corteen-Coleman took four wickets in four balls.
- Points: South East Stars 5, Northern Diamonds 0

2 June 2024
11:30
Scorecard

Northern Diamonds; 123/8 (20 overs)	v	Sunrisers; 126/6 (20 overs)
Hollie Armitage 39 (40); Mady Villiers 2/22 (4 overs)		Grace Scrivens 64* (57); Hollie Armitage 3/16 (3 overs)

Sunrisers won by 4 wickets
County Ground, Northampton
Umpires: Jasmine Naeem and Simon Widdup

- Sunrisers won the toss and elected to bowl.
- Points: Sunrisers 4, Northern Diamonds 0

8 June 2024
11:30
Scorecard

Northern Diamonds; 137/7 (20 overs)	v	Central Sparks; 124/8 (20 overs)
Hollie Armitage 62 (49); Hannah Baker 3/24 (4 overs)		Amy Jones 39 (30); Katie Levick 2/32 (4 overs)

Northern Diamonds won by 13 runs
Edgbaston Cricket Ground, Birmingham
Umpires: Chris Watts and Rose Dovey

- Central Sparks won the toss and elected to bowl.
- Points: Northern Diamonds 4, Central Sparks 0

9 June 2024
11:00
Scorecard

The Blaze; 159/7 (20 overs)	v	Northern Diamonds; 146 (19.5 overs)
Kathryn Bryce 54 (39); Erin Burns 3/19 (4 overs)		Bess Heath 59 (32); Sarah Glenn 3/33 (4 overs)

The Blaze won by 13 runs
Headingley Cricket Ground, Leeds
Umpires: Amy Clark and Neil Mallender

- Northern Diamonds won the toss and elected to bowl.
- Points: The Blaze 4, Northern Diamonds 0

14 June 2024
15:00
Scorecard

Northern Diamonds; 145/4 (20 overs)	v	Southern Vipers; 146/5 (18.5 overs)
Hollie Armitage 69* (60); Lauren Bell 2/31 (4 overs)		Charlie Dean 64* (38); Rachel Slater 2/23 (4 overs)

Southern Vipers won by 5 wickets
Rose Bowl, Southampton
Umpires: Ben Peverall and Rose Dovey

- Northern Diamonds won the toss and elected to bat.
- Points: Southern Vipers 4, Northern Diamonds 0

16 June 2024
11:00
Scorecard

Northern Diamonds; 146/3 (20 overs)	v	Western Storm; 118/7 (20 overs)
Hollie Armitage 97 (64); Sophia Smale 1/23 (4 overs); Issy Wong 1/23 (4 overs)		Fran Wilson 42 (44); Katie Levick 2/13 (4 overs)

Northern Diamonds won by 28 runs
Headingley Cricket Ground, Leeds
Umpires: Amy Clark and Peter Hartley

- Western Storm won the toss and elected to bat.
- Points: Northern Diamonds 4, Western Storm 0

19 June 2024
11:30
Scorecard

North West Thunder; 61 (14.2 overs)	v	Northern Diamonds; 62/5 (13.4 overs)
Tara Norris 13 (12); Rachel Slater 3/12 (4 overs)		Rebecca Duckworth 21* (27); Sophie Morris 2/13 (4 overs)

Northern Diamonds won by 5 wickets
Riverside Ground, Chester-le-Street
Umpires: Jasmine Naeem and Neil Pratt

- Northern Diamonds won the toss and elected to bowl.
- Points: Northern Diamonds 5, North West Thunder 0

=== Tournament statistics ===
==== Batting ====
Player	Matches	Innings	Runs	Average	High score	100s	50s
Hollie Armitage	10	10	323	35.88	97	0	3
Sterre Kalis	10	10	199	19.90	43	0	0

Source: ESPN Cricinfo Qualification: 150 runs.

==== Bowling ====
Player	Matches	Overs	Wickets	Average	Economy	BBI	5wi
Erin Burns	9	30.1	16	11.75	6.23	5/25	1
Katie Levick	10	36.0	14	16.71	6.50	3/22	0
Rachel Slater	10	31.5	12	18.83	7.09	3/12	0

Source: ESPN Cricinfo Qualification: 10 wickets.

== Season statistics ==
=== Batting ===
Player	Rachael Heyhoe Flint Trophy								Charlotte Edwards Cup							
Player	Matches	Innings	Runs	High score	Average	Strike rate	100s	50s	Matches	Innings	Runs	High score	Average	Strike rate	100s	50s
Hollie Armitage	12	12	435	103	43.50	89.32	2	2	10	10	323	97	35.88	115.77	0	3
Erin Burns	14	13	307	49	27.90	91.64	0	0	9	8	75	30	9.37	91.46	0	0
Leah Dobson	6	5	95	54	19.00	68.84	0	1	9	8	90	55	12.85	86.53	0	1
Rebecca Duckworth	6	6	83	51	13.83	55.33	0	1	3	2	27	21*	–	84.37	0	0
Katherine Fraser	7	6	75	222	15.00	60.00	0	0	10	8	57	23*	19.00	126.66	0	0
Abigail Glen	13	10	180	53*	30.00	111.80	0	1	–	–	–	–	–	–	–	–
Grace Hall	–	–	–	–	–	–	–	–	5	4	4	2*	2.00	40.00	0	0
Bess Heath	8	7	227	63	37.83	100.44	0	3	9	9	148	59	18.50	129.82	0	1
Sterre Kalis	12	12	320	100	26.66	83.76	1	1	10	10	199	43	19.90	106.98	0	0
Beth Langston	6	6	110	58*	27.50	78.01	0	1	–	–	–	–	–	–	–	–
Katie Levick	15	8	58	19	29.00	49.57	0	0	10	3	3	2*	1.50	50.00	0	0
Emma Marlow	13	13	397	63	30.53	66.49	0	3	10	10	84	47*	10.50	81.55	0	0
Lizzie Scott	4	2	7	7*	7.00	58.33	0	0	1	–	–	–	–	–	–	–
Rachel Slater	7	3	25	18*	25.00	113.63	0	0	10	3	3	2	1.50	50.00	0	0
Phoebe Turner	15	12	150	49*	16.66	68.49	0	0	1	1	4	4	4.00	57.14	0	0
Sophia Turner	8	6	23	7	4.60	41.07	0	0	6	2	10	8	10.00	111.11	0	0
Maddie Ward	1	1	20	20	20.00	45.45	0	0	–	–	–	–	–	–	–	–
Lauren Winfield-Hill	14	14	361	69*	27.76	76.80	0	3	7	7	115	38	16.42	92.00	0	0
Jessica Woolston	4	3	36	23*	18.00	80.00	0	0	–	–	–	–	–	–	–	–
Source: ESPN Cricinfo

=== Bowling ===
Player	Rachael Heyhoe Flint Trophy							Charlotte Edwards Cup						
Player	Matches	Overs	Wickets	Average	Economy	BBI	5wi	Matches	Overs	Wickets	Average	Economy	BBI	5wi
Hollie Armitage	12	13.0	4	16.50	5.07	3/40	0	10	17.0	7	16.85	6.94	3/16	0
Erin Burns	14	108.5	15	34.60	4.76	3/40	0	9	30.1	16	11.75	6.23	5/25	1
Katherine Fraser	7	25.0	4	27.50	4.40	3/37	0	10	28.0	5	36.80	6.57	1/5	0
Abigail Glen	13	56.2	8	33.87	4.81	3/42	0	–	–	–	–	–	–	–
Grace Hall	–	–	–	–	–	–	–	5	10.0	3	23.00	6.90	1/9	0
Beth Langston	6	40.0	11	17.45	4.80	6/24	1	–	–	–	–	–	–	–
Katie Levick	15	121.1	20	25.65	4.23	4/38	0	10	36.0	14	16.71	6.50	3/22	0
Emma Marlow	13	7.4	1	49.00	6.39	1/22	0	10	–	–	–	–	–	–
Lizzie Scott	4	18.0	1	127.00	7.05	1/43	0	1	3.0	2	6.00	4.00	2/12	0
Rachel Slater	7	49.2	6	37.00	4.50	2/24	0	10	31.5	12	18.83	7.09	3/12	0
Phoebe Turner	15	110.0	23	23.39	4.89	6/20	0	1	2.0	0	–	8.50	–	0
Sophia Turner	8	48.2	8	38.87	6.43	2/26	0	6	17.0	4	28.75	6.76	2/19	0
Jessica Woolston	4	25.0	3	40.33	4.84	1/28	0	–	–	–	–	–	–	–
Source: ESPN Cricinfo

=== Fielding ===
Player	Rachael Heyhoe Flint Trophy			Charlotte Edwards Cup		
Player	Matches	Innings	Catches	Matches	Innings	Catches
Hollie Armitage	12	11	6	10	10	6
Erin Burns	14	13	7	9	9	2
Leah Dobson	6	6	1	9	9	4
Rebecca Duckworth	6	6	1	3	3	0
Katherine Fraser	7	7	3	10	10	2
Abigail Glen	13	12	3	–	–	–
Grace Hall	–	–	–	5	5	2
Bess Heath	8	3	0	9	4	2
Sterre Kalis	12	11	2	10	10	5
Beth Langston	6	5	1	–	–	–
Katie Levick	15	14	3	10	10	2
Emma Marlow	13	12	2	10	10	5
Lizzie Scott	4	3	0	1	1	0
Rachel Slater	7	7	0	10	10	1
Phoebe Turner	15	14	3	1	1	0
Sophia Turner	8	8	2	6	6	2
Lauren Winfield-Hill	14	4	1	7	2	2
Jessica Woolston	4	4	2	–	–	–
Source: ESPN Cricinfo

=== Wicket-keeping ===
Player	Rachael Heyhoe Flint Trophy				Charlotte Edwards Cup			
Player	Matches	Innings	Catches	Stumpings	Matches	Innings	Catches	Stumpings
Bess Heath	14	9	8	5	9	5	1	6
Maddie Ward	1	1	1	0	–	–	–	–
Lauren Winfield-Hill	14	9	8	5	7	5	0	2
Source: ESPN Cricinfo
