= 2023 Northern Diamonds season =

English cricket season

Northern Diamonds
2023 season
- Coach: Danielle Hazell
- Captain: Hollie Armitage
- Overseas player: (South Africa) Chloe Tryon
- RHFT: 6th
- CEC: 4th
- Most runs: RHFT: Lauren Winfield-Hill (663); CEC: Hollie Armitage (216)
- Most wickets: RHFT: Katie Levick (24); CEC: Katie Levick (12)
- Most catches: RHFT: Jessica Woolston (6); CEC: Chloe Tryon (5)
- Most wicket-keeping dismissals: RHFT: Lauren Winfield-Hill (14); CEC: Bess Heath (6)

The 2023 season was Northern Diamonds' fourth season, in which they competed in the 50 over Rachael Heyhoe Flint Trophy and the Twenty20 Charlotte Edwards Cup. In the Charlotte Edwards Cup, the side won four of their seven matches, finishing fourth in the group. In the Rachael Heyhoe Flint Trophy, the side finished sixth in the group, winning six of their fourteen matches.

The side was captained by Hollie Armitage and coached by Danielle Hazell. They played five home matches at Headingley Cricket Ground, three at the Riverside Ground, and one apiece at South Northumberland Cricket Club, North Marine Road Ground and Clifton Park Ground.

== Squad ==
=== Departures ===
Rachel Hopkins retired from regional cricket at the end of the 2022 season. On 2 November 2022, it was confirmed that Jenny Gunn had retired from all forms of cricket, and that Linsey Smith had left the side, signing for Southern Vipers. On 26 January 2023, Katherine Sciver-Brunt announced her retirement from county and regional cricket. On 20 February 2023, it was announced that Nat Sciver-Brunt had left the side, joining The Blaze.

=== Arrivals ===
Rebecca Duckworth signed for the side ahead of the 2023 season, joining from North West Thunder. On 20 April 2023, it was announced that Chloe Tryon had signed as an overseas player for the side, available from April to July. On 30 April 2023, the side announced the signing of Katherine Fraser. On 1 July 2023, Ellie Nightingale was included in a matchday squad for the first time. On 8 September 2023, Frances Lonsdale was included in a matchday squad for the first time, and the side announced the loan of Sophia Turner from North West Thunder for the remainder of the season.

=== Personnel and contract changes ===
On 2 November 2022, Northern Diamonds announced the players that had been awarded professional contracts for the 2023 season, with Leah Dobson, Emma Marlow, Phoebe Turner and Lauren Winfield-Hill signing their first such contracts with the side.

=== Squad list ===
- Age given is at the start of Northern Diamonds' first match of the season (22 April 2023).

Name	Nationality	Birth date	Batting Style	Bowling Style	Notes
Batters
Leah Dobson	England	6 October 2001 (aged 21)	Right-handed	Right arm medium	
Rebecca Duckworth	England	30 October 2000 (aged 22)	Right-handed	Right arm medium	
Sterre Kalis	Netherlands	30 August 1999 (aged 23)	Right-handed	Right-arm medium	
Frances Lonsdale	England	Unknown	Right-handed	Unknown	Joined September 2023
Phoebe Turner	England	8 August 2003 (aged 19)	Right-handed	Right-arm medium	
All-rounders
Hollie Armitage	England	14 June 1997 (aged 25)	Right-handed	Right-arm leg break	Captain
Katherine Fraser	Scotland	9 April 2005 (aged 18)	Right-handed	Right-arm off break	Joined April 2023
Abigail Glen	England	2 April 2001 (aged 22)	Right-handed	Right-arm medium	
Yvonne Graves	England	10 October 1998 (aged 24)	Right-handed	Right-arm off break	
Chloe Tryon	South Africa	25 January 1994 (aged 29)	Right-handed	Slow left-arm orthodox	Overseas player; April to July 2023
Wicket-keepers
Bess Heath	England	20 August 2001 (aged 21)	Right-handed	—	
Ellie Nightingale	England	28 November 2000 (aged 22)	Right-handed	—	Joined July 2023
Lauren Winfield-Hill	England	16 August 1990 (aged 32)	Right-handed	Right-arm medium	
Bowlers
Grace Hall	England	24 December 2002 (aged 20)	Right-handed	Right-arm medium	
Beth Langston	England	6 September 1992 (aged 30)	Right-handed	Right-arm medium	
Katie Levick	England	17 July 1991 (aged 31)	Right-handed	Right-arm leg break	
Emma Marlow	England	12 April 2004 (aged 19)	Right-handed	Right-arm off break	
Lizzie Scott	England	1 September 2004 (aged 18)	Right-handed	Right-arm medium	
Rachel Slater	Scotland	20 November 2001 (aged 21)	Right-handed	Left-arm medium	
Sophia Turner	England	23 April 2003 (aged 19)	Right-handed	Right-arm medium	Three match loan from North West Thunder in September 2023
Jessica Woolston	England	25 February 2003 (aged 20)	Right-handed	Right-arm medium	

== Rachael Heyhoe Flint Trophy ==
=== Season standings ===
Pos	Team	Pld	W	L	T	NR	BP	Pts	NRR
1	Southern Vipers (Q)	14	7	4	1	2	4	38	0.457
2	The Blaze (Q)	14	7	4	0	3	4	38	0.173
3	South East Stars (Q)	14	7	6	0	1	6	36	0.583
4	Sunrisers	14	6	5	0	3	2	32	−0.006
5	Central Sparks	14	6	5	1	2	1	31	−0.233
6	Northern Diamonds	14	6	7	0	1	4	30	−0.034
7	North West Thunder	14	3	5	2	4	2	26	−0.274
8	Western Storm	14	2	8	0	4	0	16	−1.068

Source: England and Wales Cricket Board

advanced to the final advanced to the play-off

=== Fixtures ===
22 April 2023
10:30
Scorecard

Northern Diamonds; 290/8 (36 overs)	v	Western Storm; 185 (33.3 overs)
Lauren Winfield-Hill 75 (79); Alex Griffiths 2/40 (7 overs)		Fran Wilson 43 (43); Katie Levick 4/36 (8 overs)

Northern Diamonds won by 105 runs
Headingley Cricket Ground, Leeds
Umpires: Paul Pollard and Rose Dovey

- Western Storm won the toss and elected to field.
- Match reduced to 36 overs per side due to rain.
- Points: Northern Diamonds 5, Western Storm 0

29 April 2023
10:30
Scorecard

Northern Diamonds; 161 (36.3 overs)	v	Central Sparks; 162/3 (38.2 overs)
Lauren Winfield-Hill 42 (40); Georgia Davis 4/19 (7.3 overs)		Evelyn Jones 67* (111); Jessica Woolston 1/21 (5 overs)

Central Sparks won by 7 wickets
New Road, Worcester
Umpires: Naeem Ashraf and Jasmine Naeem

- Central Sparks won the toss and elected to field.
- Points: Central Sparks 5, Northern Diamonds 0

1 May 2023
10:30
Scorecard

Sunrisers; 157 (46 overs)	v	Northern Diamonds; 160/5 (28.3 overs)
Jodi Grewcock 50 (93); Katie Levick 3/23 (8 overs)		Lauren Winfield-Hill 51 (43); Mady Villiers 3/42 (10 overs)

Northern Diamonds won by 5 wickets
County Ground, Chelmsford
Umpires: Joanne Ibbotson and Rob White

- Sunrisers won the toss and elected to bat.
- Points: Northern Diamonds 5, Sunrisers 0

6 May 2023
10:30
Scorecard

Northern Diamonds; 62 (18.1 overs)	v	The Blaze; 63/6 (18.5 overs)
Bess Heath 9 (15); Nadine de Klerk 7/33 (9.1 overs)		Marie Kelly 15 (18); Chloe Tyron 4/16 (7.5 overs)

The Blaze won by 4 wickets
Riverside Ground, Chester-le-Street
Umpires: Jasmine Naeem and Neil Pratt

- The Blaze won the toss and elected to field.
- Points: The Blaze 5, Northern Diamonds 0

10 May 2023
10:30
Scorecard

South East Stars; 223 (44.2 overs)	v	Northern Diamonds; 178/7 (35.4 overs)
Sophia Dunkley 101* (101); Jessica Woolston 5/37 (9 overs)		Sterre Kalis 66* (98); Ryana MacDonald-Gay 2/25 (4 overs)

Northern Diamonds won by 3 wickets (DLS method)
North Marine Road Ground, Scarborough
Umpires: Phil Mustard and Jasmine Naeem

- Northern Diamonds won the toss and elected to field.
- Northern Diamonds were set a revised target of 178 runs from 36 overs due to rain.
- Points: Northern Diamonds 5, South East Stars 0

2 July 2023
10:30
Scorecard

South East Stars; 205 (46 overs)	v	Northern Diamonds; 209/3 (33 overs)
Chloe Hill 63 (80); Grace Hall 4/33 (8 overs)		Lauren Winfield-Hill 116* (100); Darcey Carter 2/31 (5 overs)

Northern Diamonds won by 7 wickets
County Ground, Beckenham
Umpires: Fiona Richards and Nigel Llong

- South East Stars won the toss and elected to bat.
- Points: Northern Diamonds 5, South East Stars 0

7 July 2023
10:30
Scorecard

Northern Diamonds; 185 (50 overs)	v	The Blaze; 189/1 (24.5 overs)
Lauren Winfield-Hill 56 (58); Sophie Munro 3/35 (10 overs)		Tammy Beaumont 83* (62); Katie Levick 1/40 (6 overs)

The Blaze won by 9 wickets
Queen's Park, Chesterfield
Umpires: Fiona Richards and James Middlebrook

- Northern Diamonds won the toss and elected to bat.
- Points: The Blaze 5, Northern Diamonds 0

11 July 2023
10:30
Scorecard

Northern Diamonds; 167 (50 overs)	v	North West Thunder; 168/4 (38.4 overs)
Lauren Winfield-Hill 33 (38); Naomi Dattani 4/16 (6.5 overs)		Deandra Dottin 54* (86); Katie Levick 2/43 (8 overs)

North West Thunder won by 6 wickets
Clifton Park, York
Umpires: Amy Clark and Anthony Harris

- North West Thunder won the toss and elected to field.
- North West Thunder 5, Northern Diamonds 0

15 July 2023
10:30
Scorecard

Northern Diamonds; 223/4 (34 overs)	v	Central Sparks; 164/5 (18.4 overs)
Hollie Armitage 66 (56); Georgia Davis 2/40 (4 overs)		Katie George 56 (35); Katie Levick 3/31 (3.4 overs)

Central Sparks won by 5 wickets (DLS method)
Headingley Cricket Ground, Leeds
Umpires: Grace Bambury and Simon Widdup

- Central Sparks won the toss and elected to field.
- Northern Diamonds innings reduced to 34 overs due to rain.
- Central Sparks innings reduced to 19 overs due to rain; target was 164.
- Points: Central Sparks 4, Northern Diamonds 0

22 July 2023
10:30
Scorecard

Northern Diamonds; 105/4 (25.4 overs)	v	Southern Vipers
Hollie Armitage 48 (64); Georgia Adams 2/23 (4.4 overs)

No result
Arundel Castle Cricket Ground, Arundel
Umpires: Anthony Harris and Ben Peverall

- Southern Vipers won the toss and elected to field.
- No further play was possible due to rain.
- Points: Southern Vipers 2, Northern Diamonds 2

5 September 2023
10:30
Scorecard

Southern Vipers; 261/8 (50 overs)	v	Northern Diamonds; 258/5 (50 overs)
Georgia Adams 82 (98); Grace Hall 4/46 (10 overs)		Hollie Armitage 106* (107); Nancy Harman 1/31 (5 overs)

Southern Vipers won by 3 runs
South Northumberland Cricket Club, Gosforth
Umpires: Amy Clark and James Middlebrook

- Southern Vipers won the toss and elected to bat.
- Points: Southern Vipers 4, Northern Diamonds 0

10 September 2023
10:30
Scorecard

Northern Diamonds; 281/3 (43 overs)	v	Western Storm; 250/7 (43 overs)
Lauren Winfield-Hill 83 (92); Mollie Robbins 2/41 (9 overs)		Sophie Luff 87 (105); Lizzie Scott 2/30 (7 overs)

Northern Diamonds won by 31 runs
County Ground, Taunton
Umpires: Rose Dovey and Simon Widdup

- Western Storm won the toss and elected to field.
- Match reduced to 43 overs per side due to rain.
- Points: Northern Diamonds 4, Western Storm 0

13 September 2023
10:30
Scorecard

Northern Diamonds; 196 (46.4 overs)	v	North West Thunder; 148 (33.4 overs)
Lauren Winfield-Hill 89 (90); Olivia Bell 4/32 (10 overs)		Seren Smale 33 (50); Katie Levick 4/28 (10 overs)

Northern Diamonds won by 48 runs
Rookwood Cricket Ground, Sale
Umpires: Joanne Ibbotson and Naeem Ashraf

- North West Thunder won the toss and elected to field.
- Points: Northern Diamonds 5, North West Thunder 0

16 September 2023
10:30
Scorecard

Northern Diamonds; 114/6 (18 overs)	v	Sunrisers; 126/4 (17.3 overs)
Bess Heath 37 (21); Eva Gray 2/24 (5 overs)		Jo Gardner 30* (21); Grace Hall 2/36 (4 overs)

Sunrisers won by 6 wickets (DLS method)
Riverside Ground, Chester-le-Street
Umpires: Gabi Brown and Hassan Adnan

- Sunrisers won the toss and elected to field.
- Match reduced to 18 overs per side due to rain; Sunrisers target was 126.
- Points: Sunrisers 4, Northern Diamonds 0

=== Tournament statistics ===
==== Batting ====
Player	Matches	Innings	Runs	Average	High score	100s	50s
Lauren Winfield-Hill	14	14	663	51.00	116*	1	5
Hollie Armitage	13	13	384	32.00	106*	1	1
Sterre Kalis	14	14	299	23.00	66*	0	1
Bess Heath	9	9	286	40.85	71	0	1

Source: ESPN Cricinfo Qualification: 200 runs.

==== Bowling ====
Player	Matches	Overs	Wickets	Average	Economy	BBI	5wi
Katie Levick	14	99.0	24	18.12	4.39	4/28	0
Jessica Woolston	12	66.0	13	23.23	4.57	5/37	1
Lizzie Scott	14	84.3	12	31.75	4.50	3/33	0
Grace Hall	8	47.4	11	24.09	5.55	4/33	0

Source: ESPN Cricinfo Qualification: 10 wickets.

== Charlotte Edwards Cup ==
=== Season standings ===
Pos	Team	Pld	W	L	T	NR	BP	Pts	NRR
1	The Blaze (Q)	7	7	0	0	0	4	32	1.765
2	Southern Vipers (Q)	7	5	2	0	0	2	22	0.940
3	North West Thunder (Q)	7	4	3	0	0	2	18	0.331
4	Northern Diamonds	7	4	3	0	0	1	17	−0.129
5	South East Stars	7	3	4	0	0	0	12	−0.096
6	Western Storm	7	3	4	0	0	0	12	−0.512
7	Central Sparks	7	2	5	0	0	0	8	−0.558
8	Sunrisers	7	0	7	0	0	0	0	−1.717

Source: England and Wales Cricket Board

advanced to final advanced to the semi-final

=== Fixtures ===
19 May 2023
18:30 BST (D/N)
Scorecard

Northern Diamonds; 218/3 (20 overs)	v	Western Storm; 186/8 (20 overs)
Lauren Winfield-Hill 98 (56); Orla Prendergast 1/32 (4 overs)		Danielle Gibson 52 (30); Katie Levick 2/25 (3 overs)

Northern Diamonds won by 32 runs
Headingley Cricket Ground, Leeds
Umpires: Grace Bambury and Hassan Adnan

- Western Storm won the toss and elected to field.
- Points: Northern Diamonds 4, Western Storm 0

23 May 2023
11:00 BST
Scorecard

Northern Diamonds; 135 (19.3 overs)	v	Central Sparks; 132/7 (20 overs)
Leah Dobson 41 (25); Georgia Davis 3/13 (4 overs)		Evelyn Jones 30 (34); Chloe Tryon 3/30 (4 overs)

Northern Diamonds won by 3 runs
Edgbaston Cricket Ground, Birmingham
Umpires: Anna Harris and Anthony Harris

- Central Sparks won the toss and elected to field.
- Points: Northern Diamonds 4, Central Sparks 0

26 May 2023
13:45 BST
Scorecard

South East Stars; 138/7 (20 overs)	v	Northern Diamonds; 140/8 (20 overs)
Alice Capsey 71 (48); Grace Hall 3/20 (4 overs)		Hollie Armitage 82 (59); Claudie Cooper 3/12 (4 overs)

Northern Diamonds won by 2 wickets
The Oval, London
Umpires: Anna Harris and Ben Debenham

- Northern Diamonds won the toss and elected to field.
- Points: Northern Diamonds 4, South East Stars 0

28 May 2023
15:30 BST
Scorecard

Northern Diamonds; 172/7 (20 overs)	v	Sunrisers; 137 (18.4 overs)
Leah Dobson 47 (40); Grace Scrivens 2/24 (4 overs)		Grace Scrivens 50 (35); Katie Levick 5/19 (4 overs)

Northern Diamonds won by 35 runs
Headingley Cricket Ground, Leeds
Umpires: Phil Mustard and Simon Widdup

- Northern Diamonds won the toss and elected to bat.
- Points: Northern Diamonds 5, Sunrisers 0

2 June 2023
14:30 BST
Scorecard

Northern Diamonds; 129/7 (20 overs)	v	The Blaze; 133/4 (15.4 overs)
Lauren Winfield-Hill 40 (47); Nadine de Klerk 3/31 (4 overs)		Sarah Bryce 67* (43); Abigail Glen 2/23 (3 overs)

The Blaze won by 6 wickets
Riverside Ground, Chester-le-Street
Umpires: Joanne Ibbotson and Simon Widdup

- Northern Diamonds won the toss and elected to bat.
- Points: The Blaze 5, Northern Diamonds 0

4 June 2023
15:30 BST
Scorecard

Southern Vipers; 144/6 (20 overs)	v	Northern Diamonds; 128/9 (20 overs)
Georgia Adams 42* (42); Katie Levick 2/12 (4 overs)		Sterre Kalis 32 (36); Anya Shrubsole 4/18 (4 overs)

Southern Vipers won by 16 runs
Headingley Cricket Ground, Leeds
Umpires: Joanne Ibbotson and Simon Widdup

- Southern Vipers won the toss and elected to bat.
- Points: Southern Vipers 4, Northern Diamonds 0

7 June 2023
11:00 BST
Scorecard

Northern Diamonds; 96 (18.4 overs)	v	North West Thunder; 97/3 (15 overs)
Sterre Kalis 24 (28); Olivia Bell 3/9 (3 overs)		Fi Morris 42* (34); Katherine Fraser 1/14 (3 overs)

North West Thunder won by 7 wickets
Stanley Park, Blackpool
Umpires: Naeem Ashraf and Jasmine Naeem

- Northern Diamonds won the toss and elected to bat.
- Points: North West Thunder 5, Northern Diamonds 0

=== Tournament statistics ===
==== Batting ====
Player	Matches	Innings	Runs	Average	High score	100s	50s
Hollie Armitage	7	7	216	30.85	82	0	2
Lauren Winfield-Hill	7	7	171	24.42	98	0	1
Leah Dobson	7	7	135	19.28	47	0	0
Sterre Kalis	7	6	113	18.83	32	0	0
Bess Heath	7	7	108	18.00	31	0	0

Source: ESPN Cricinfo Qualification: 100 runs.

==== Bowling ====
Player	Matches	Overs	Wickets	Average	Economy	BBI	5wi
Katie Levick	7	23.0	12	12.00	6.26	5/19	1
Grace Hall	7	20.4	10	17.00	8.22	3/20	0
Chloe Tryon	7	26.4	8	24.37	7.31	3/30	0
Lizzie Scott	7	23.0	7	21.00	6.39	2/27	0
Abigail Glen	6	18.0	5	31.40	8.72	2/23	0

Source: ESPN Cricinfo Qualification: 5 wickets.

== Season statistics ==
=== Batting ===
Player	Rachael Heyhoe Flint Trophy								Charlotte Edwards Cup							
Player	Matches	Innings	Runs	High score	Average	Strike rate	100s	50s	Matches	Innings	Runs	High score	Average	Strike rate	100s	50s
Hollie Armitage	13	13	384	106*	32.00	85.33	1	1	7	7	216	82	30.85	129.34	0	2
Leah Dobson	10	7	154	68*	25.66	94.47	0	1	7	7	135	47	19.28	120.53	0	0
Rebecca Duckworth	6	4	55	27	13.75	51.40	0	0	–	–	–	–	–	–	–	–
Katherine Fraser	2	2	7	4	7.00	87.50	0	0	7	6	53	26	10.60	75.71	0	0
Abigail Glen	5	4	7	5	1.75	26.92	0	0	6	4	24	13*	8.00	100.00	0	0
Grace Hall	8	3	48	21*	24.00	48.97	0	0	7	3	5	4*	2.50	50.00	0	0
Bess Heath	9	9	286	71	40.85	133.02	0	1	7	7	108	31	18.00	147.94	0	0
Sterre Kalis	14	14	299	66*	23.00	61.02	0	1	7	6	113	32	18.83	94.95	0	0
Katie Levick	14	6	22	11	4.40	45.83	0	0	7	4	7	4	3.50	77.77	0	0
Beth Langston	–	–	–	–	–	–	–	–	1	1	2	2	2.00	66.66	0	0
Emma Marlow	10	10	164	25*	27.33	58.36	0	0	–	–	–	–	–	–	–	–
Lizzie Scott	14	7	32	11*	6.40	35.95	0	0	7	5	25	11*	8.33	69.44	0	0
Rachel Slater	1	–	–	–	–	–	–	–	–	–	–	–	–	–	–	–
Chloe Tryon	9	9	184	63	30.66	110.17	0	2	7	7	95	30	19.00	137.68	0	0
Phoebe Turner	11	10	45	13	5.62	51.72	0	0	–	–	–	–	–	–	–	–
Sophia Turner	2	1	4	4*	–	133.33	0	0	–	–	–	–	–	–	–	–
Lauren Winfield-Hill	14	14	663	116*	51.00	95.80	1	5	7	7	171	98	24.42	123.02	0	1
Jessica Woolston	12	5	25	13	8.33	43.10	0	0	–	–	–	–	–	–	–	–
Source: ESPN Cricinfo

=== Bowling ===
Player	Rachael Heyhoe Flint Trophy							Charlotte Edwards Cup						
Player	Matches	Overs	Wickets	Average	Economy	BBI	5wi	Matches	Overs	Wickets	Average	Economy	BBI	5wi
Hollie Armitage	13	28.1	2	94.00	6.67	1/26	0	7	–	–	–	–	–	–
Katherine Fraser	2	4.0	0	–	3.50	–	0	7	15.0	2	61.50	8.20	1/14	0
Abigail Glen	5	25.3	6	22.00	5.17	2/34	0	6	18.0	5	31.40	8.72	2/23	0
Grace Hall	8	47.4	11	24.09	5.55	4/33	0	7	20.4	10	17.00	8.22	3/20	0
Katie Levick	14	99.0	24	18.12	4.39	4/28	0	7	23.0	12	12.00	6.26	5/19	1
Beth Langston	–	–	–	–	–	–	–	1	3.0	1	22.00	7.33	1/22	0
Emma Marlow	10	12.0	1	79.00	6.58	1/31	0	–	–	–	–	–	–	–
Lizzie Scott	14	84.3	12	31.75	4.50	3/33	0	7	23.0	7	21.00	6.39	2/27	0
Chloe Tryon	9	55.3	6	41.50	4.48	4/16	0	7	26.4	8	24.37	7.31	3/30	0
Phoebe Turner	11	21.0	5	24.00	5.71	3/18	0	–	–	–	–	–	–	–
Sophia Turner	2	10.0	2	26.50	5.30	1/22	0	–	–	–	–	–	–	–
Jessica Woolston	12	66.0	13	23.23	4.57	5/37	1	–	–	–	–	–	–	–
Source: ESPN Cricinfo

=== Fielding ===
Player	Rachael Heyhoe Flint Trophy			Charlotte Edwards Cup		
Player	Matches	Innings	Catches	Matches	Innings	Catches
Hollie Armitage	13	12	1	7	7	2
Leah Dobson	10	9	2	7	7	3
Rebecca Duckworth	6	5	1	–	–	–
Katherine Fraser	2	2	1	7	7	2
Abigail Glen	5	5	3	6	6	3
Grace Hall	8	8	1	7	7	4
Bess Heath	9	9	1	7	7	0
Sterre Kalis	14	13	4	7	7	2
Katie Levick	14	13	0	7	7	1
Beth Langston	–	–	–	1	1	0
Emma Marlow	10	9	3	–	–	–
Lizzie Scott	14	13	1	7	7	1
Rachel Slater	1	0	0	–	–	–
Chloe Tryon	9	8	4	7	7	5
Phoebe Turner	11	11	3	–	–	–
Sophia Turner	2	2	0	–	–	–
Lauren Winfield-Hill	14	0	0	7	7	3
Jessica Woolston	12	11	6	–	–	–
Source: ESPN Cricinfo

=== Wicket-keeping ===
Player	Rachael Heyhoe Flint Trophy				Charlotte Edwards Cup			
Player	Matches	Innings	Catches	Stumpings	Matches	Innings	Catches	Stumpings
Bess Heath	9	–	–	–	7	7	2	4
Lauren Winfield-Hill	14	13	10	4	7	–	–	–
Source: ESPN Cricinfo
