= 2022 Northern Diamonds season =

English cricket season

Northern Diamonds
2022 season
- Coach: Danielle Hazell
- Captain: Hollie Armitage
- Overseas player: (New Zealand) Leigh Kasperek
- RHFT: Champions
- CEC: Group B, 2nd
- Most runs: RHFT: Lauren Winfield-Hill (470); CEC: Hollie Armitage (151)
- Most wickets: RHFT: Linsey Smith (13); CEC: Katie Levick (15)
- Most catches: RHFT: Sterre Kalis (6); CEC: Hollie Armitage (5)
- Most wicket-keeping dismissals: RHFT: Lauren Winfield-Hill (13); CEC: Bess Heath (3)

The 2022 season was Northern Diamonds' third season, in which they competed in the 50 over Rachael Heyhoe Flint Trophy and the Twenty20 Charlotte Edwards Cup. In the Charlotte Edwards Cup, the side finished second in Group B, winning three of their six matches. The side finished top of the group in the Rachael Heyhoe Flint Trophy, winning six of their seven matches (with the other cancelled) and progressing directly to the final. In the final, they faced Southern Vipers for the third time in three Rachael Heyhoe Flint Trophy finals. Northern Diamonds won by 2 runs to claim their first ever title. Northern Diamonds batter Lauren Winfield-Hill was named as Player of the Year in the Rachael Heyhoe Flint Trophy, and was the tournament's leading run-scorer with 470 runs at an average of 78.30.

The side was captained by Hollie Armitage and coached by Danielle Hazell. They played three home matches at the Riverside Ground and three at Headingley Cricket Ground.

== Squad ==
=== Changes ===
On 29 October 2021, it was announced that Ami Campbell and Phoebe Graham had both left the side, signing professional contracts with Central Sparks and North West Thunder, respectively. On the same day it was announced that Bess Heath, Katie Levick, Sterre Kalis and Rachel Slater had all signed professional contracts with the side, having previously been on temporary contracts. On 29 April 2022, it was announced that the side had signed Leigh Kasperek as an overseas player and Yvonne Graves from Lightning, as well as promoting Emma Marlow and Phoebe Turner to the senior squad from the Academy. It was also announced that Katherine Fraser and Mariko Hill would be training with the squad during the season. The side's full 18-player squad was confirmed on 12 May 2022, with the addition of Abigail Glen and the departure of Alex MacDonald, Helen Fenby and Ella Telford. Mariko Hill was added to the full squad on 28 May 2022. Lizzie Scott was added to the squad in September 2022, making her debut for the side on 11 September. Jessica Woolston and Grace Hall were first included in a matchday squad on 16 September 2022.

=== Squad list ===
- Age given is at the start of Northern Diamonds' first match of the season (14 May 2022).

Name	Nationality	Birth date	Batting Style	Bowling Style	Notes
Batters
Leah Dobson	England	6 October 2001 (aged 20)	Right-handed	Right arm medium	
Rachel Hopkins	England	19 July 1992 (aged 29)	Right-handed	Right-arm medium	
Sterre Kalis	Netherlands	30 August 1999 (aged 22)	Right-handed	Right-arm medium	
Phoebe Turner	England	8 August 2003 (aged 18)	Right-handed	Right-arm medium	
All-rounders
Hollie Armitage	England	14 June 1997 (aged 24)	Right-handed	Right-arm leg break	Captain
Katherine Brunt	England	2 July 1985 (aged 36)	Right-handed	Right-arm fast medium	
Abigail Glen	England	2 April 2001 (aged 21)	Right-handed	Right-arm medium	
Yvonne Graves	England	10 October 1998 (aged 23)	Right-handed	Right-arm off break	
Jenny Gunn	England	9 May 1986 (aged 36)	Right-handed	Right-arm medium	
Mariko Hill	Hong Kong	20 November 1995 (aged 26)	Right-handed	Right-arm medium	Joined May 2022
Nat Sciver	England	20 August 1992 (aged 29)	Right-handed	Right-arm medium	
Wicket-keepers
Bess Heath	England	20 August 2001 (aged 20)	Right-handed	—	
Lauren Winfield-Hill	England	16 August 1990 (aged 31)	Right-handed	Right-arm medium	
Bowlers
Grace Hall	England	24 December 2002 (aged 19)	Right-handed	Right-arm medium	Joined September 2022
Leigh Kasperek	New Zealand	6 September 1992 (aged 29)	Right-handed	Right-arm off break	Overseas player
Beth Langston	England	6 September 1992 (aged 29)	Right-handed	Right-arm medium	
Katie Levick	England	17 July 1991 (aged 30)	Right-handed	Right-arm leg break	
Emma Marlow	England	12 April 2004 (aged 18)	Right-handed	Right-arm off break	
Lizzie Scott	England	1 September 2004 (aged 17)	Right-handed	Right-arm medium	Joined September 2022
Rachel Slater	Scotland	20 November 2001 (aged 20)	Right-handed	Left-arm medium	
Linsey Smith	England	10 March 1995 (aged 27)	Left-handed	Slow left-arm orthodox	
Jessica Woolston	England	25 February 2003 (aged 19)	Right-handed	Right-arm medium	Joined September 2022

== Charlotte Edwards Cup ==
=== Group B ===
Pos	Team	Pld	W	L	T	NR	BP	Pts	NRR
1	Southern Vipers (Q)	6	6	0	0	0	3	27	1.400
2	Northern Diamonds	6	3	3	0	0	2	14	−0.102
3	North West Thunder	6	2	4	0	0	2	10	−0.190
4	Lightning	6	1	5	0	0	0	4	−1.072

Source: England and Wales Cricket Board
- advanced to the final

=== Fixtures ===
14 May 2022
14:30 BST
Scorecard

Northern Diamonds; 177/5 (20 overs)	v	Lightning; 138/7 (20 overs)
Lauren Winfield-Hill 96 (51); Kathryn Bryce 2/44 (4 overs)		Tammy Beaumont 59 (49); Emma Marlow 2/12 (4 overs)

Northern Diamonds won by 39 runs
Haslegrave Ground, Loughborough
Umpires: Grace Bambury and Sue Redfern

- Northern Diamonds won the toss and elected to bat.
- Points: Northern Diamonds 5, Lightning 0

18 May 2022
13:30 BST
Scorecard

North West Thunder; 148/7 (20 overs)	v	Northern Diamonds; 92 (20 overs)
Georgie Boyce 65 (56); Katie Levick 4/22 (4 overs)		Bess Heath 19 (14); Hannah Jones 3/23 (4 overs)

North West Thunder won by 56 runs
Rookwood Cricket Ground, Sale
Umpires: Grace Bambury and Graham Lloyd

- North West Thunder won the toss and elected to bat.
- Points: North West Thunder 5, Northern Diamonds 0

21 May 2022
14:30 BST
Scorecard

Southern Vipers; 126 (19.3 overs)	v	Northern Diamonds; 115/7 (20 overs)
Danni Wyatt 48 (43); Katie Levick 5/15 (4 overs)		Bess Heath 51 (44); Georgia Adams 2/9 (3 overs)

Southern Vipers won by 11 runs
Riverside Ground, Chester-le-Street
Umpires: Joanne Ibbotson and Naeem Ashraf

- Southern Vipers won the toss and elected to bat.
- Points: Southern Vipers 4, Northern Diamonds 0

29 May 2022
11:00 BST
Scorecard

Northern Diamonds; 124 (20 overs)	v	North West Thunder; 99 (19 overs)
Sterre Kalis 28 (30); Hannah Jones 3/23 (4 overs)		Danielle Collins 26 (33); Katie Levick 3/25 (4 overs)

Northern Diamonds won by 25 runs
Headingley Cricket Ground, Headingley
Umpires: Anna Harris and David Millns

- Northern Diamonds won the toss and elected to bat.
- Points: Northern Diamonds 5, North West Thunder 0

1 June 2022
14:15 BST
Scorecard

Northern Diamonds; 145/5 (20 overs)	v	Lightning; 140 (19.5 overs)
Bess Heath 60 (46); Piepa Cleary 2/24 (4 overs)		Ella Claridge 41 (36); Hollie Armitage 4/27 (4 overs)

Northern Diamonds won by 5 runs
Riverside Ground, Chester-le-Street
Umpires: Jane Pratt and Neil Pratt

- Northern Diamonds won the toss and elected to bat.
- Points: Northern Diamonds 4, Lightning 0

4 June 2022
14:30 BST
Scorecard

Northern Diamonds; 141/4 (20 overs)	v	Southern Vipers; 144/4 (18.2 overs)
Nat Sciver 50 (37); Charlie Dean 2/24 (4 overs)		Georgia Adams 47 (41); Leigh Kasperek 2/16 (2 overs)

Southern Vipers won by 6 wickets
Rose Bowl, Southampton
Umpires: Nigel Llong and Sarah Bartlett

- Northern Diamonds won the toss and elected to bat.
- Points: Southern Vipers 4, Northern Diamonds 0

=== Tournament statistics ===
==== Batting ====
Player	Matches	Innings	Runs	Average	High score	100s	50s
Hollie Armitage	6	6	151	37.75	48*	0	0
Bess Heath	5	5	146	29.20	60	0	2
Sterre Kalis	4	4	106	26.50	39	0	0
Lauren Winfield-Hill	2	2	96	48.00	96	0	1
Nat Sciver	3	3	56	18.66	50	0	1
Linsey Smith	6	6	53	10.60	25	0	0

Source: ESPN Cricinfo Qualification: 50 runs.

==== Bowling ====
Player	Matches	Overs	Wickets	Average	Economy	BBI	5wi
Katie Levick	6	20.0	15	9.06	6.80	5/15	1
Linsey Smith	6	22.4	8	15.87	5.60	3/18	0
Emma Marlow	5	17.0	7	12.00	4.94	2/12	0
Leigh Kasperek	6	17.0	5	26.60	7.82	2/16	0

Source: ESPN Cricinfo Qualification: 5 wickets.

== Rachael Heyhoe Flint Trophy ==
=== Season standings ===
Pos	Team	Pld	W	L	T	NR	BP	Pts	NRR
1	Northern Diamonds (Q)	7	6	0	0	1	2	28	0.851
2	South East Stars (Q)	7	5	1	0	1	4	26	0.687
3	Southern Vipers (Q)	7	5	1	0	1	2	24	0.762
4	Western Storm	7	3	3	0	1	1	15	−0.214
5	Central Sparks	7	2	4	0	1	1	11	0.073
6	Lightning	7	2	4	0	1	1	11	−0.630
7	North West Thunder	7	1	5	0	1	0	6	−0.366
8	Sunrisers	7	0	6	0	1	0	2	−1.046

Source: England and Wales Cricket Board

advanced to final advanced to the play-off

=== Fixtures ===
3 July 2022
10:30 BST
Scorecard

North West Thunder; 235/7 (50 overs)	v	Northern Diamonds; 241/4 (42.2 overs)
Emma Lamb 82 (80); Linsey Smith 2/34 (10 overs)		Lauren Winfield-Hill 93 (72); Laura Jackson 2/67 (10 overs)

Northern Diamonds won by 6 wickets
Rookwood Cricket Ground, Sale
Umpires: Anna Harris and Hassan Adnan

- North West Thunder won the toss and elected to bat.
- Points: Northern Diamonds 4, North West Thunder 0

9 July 2022
10:30 BST
Scorecard

Northern Diamonds; 194 (49.5 overs)	v	Sunrisers; 188 (45.2 overs)
Hollie Armitage 47 (60); Grace Scrivens 4/20 (10 overs)		Naomi Dattani 41 (58); Linsey Smith 3/34 (10 overs)

Northern Diamonds won by 6 runs
Headingley Cricket Ground, Leeds
Umpires: Hassan Adnan and Jasmine Naeem

- Northern Diamonds won the toss and elected to bat.
- Points: Northern Diamonds 4, Sunrisers 0

16 July 2022
10:30 BST
Scorecard

Central Sparks; 214/6 (50 overs)	v	Northern Diamonds; 215/5 (39.2 overs)
Evelyn Jones 91 (128); Emma Marlow 2/37 (10 overs)		Hollie Armitage 60* (63); Grace Potts 2/43 (7.2 overs)

Northern Diamonds won by 5 wickets
New Road, Worcester
Umpires: Anthony Harris and Sarah Bartlett

- Central Sparks won the toss and elected to bat.
- Points: Northern Diamonds 5, Central Sparks 0

23 July 2022
10:30 BST
Scorecard

Lightning; 199 (49.1 overs)	v	Northern Diamonds; 200/9 (49.4 overs)
Tammy Beaumont 70 (105); Leigh Kasperek 3/39 (10 overs)		Lauren Winfield-Hill 61 (75); Lucy Higham 3/50 (10 overs)

Northern Diamonds won by 1 wicket
Riverside Ground, Chester-le-Street
Umpires: Naeem Ashraf and Surenidran Shanmugam

- Lightning won the toss and elected to bat.
- Points: Northern Diamonds 4, Lightning 0

9 September 2022
10:30 BST

South East Stars	v	Northern Diamonds

No Result
County Ground, Beckenham

- The match was postponed due to the death of Queen Elizabeth II, and later deemed a no result with points shared.
- Points: South East Stars 2, Northern Diamonds 2

11 September 2022
10:30 BST
Scorecard

Northern Diamonds; 334/6 (50 overs)	v	Western Storm; 230 (45.4 overs)
Hollie Armitage 131* (131); Chloe Skelton 2/39 (10 overs)		Danielle Gibson 76 (59); Katie Levick 4/41 (8.4 overs)

Northern Diamonds won by 104 runs
County Ground, Taunton
Umpires: Ben Peverall and Paul Baldwin

- Northern Diamonds won the toss and elected to bat.
- Points: Northern Diamonds 5, Western Storm 0

17 September 2022
10:30 BST
Scorecard

Southern Vipers; 226/9 (50 overs)	v	Northern Diamonds; 231/6 (43 overs)
Georgia Elwiss 61 (95); Hollie Armitage 3/37 (7 overs)		Lauren Winfield-Hill 125 (125); Georgia Adams 2/37 (10 overs)

Northern Diamonds won by 4 wickets
Headingley Cricket Ground, Leeds
Umpires: Anthony Harris and Sarah Bartlett

- Southern Vipers won the toss and elected to bat.
- Points: Northern Diamonds 4, Southern Vipers 0

==== Final ====
25 September 2022
10:30 BST
Scorecard

Northern Diamonds; 215/9 (50 overs)	v	Southern Vipers; 213/9 (50 overs)
Lauren Winfield-Hill 65 (87); Georgia Adams 3/34 (7 overs)		Georgia Adams 70 (96); Linsey Smith 2/24 (10 overs)

Northern Diamonds won by 2 runs
Lord's, London
Umpires: Rob White and Grace Banbury
Player of the match: Lauren Winfield-Hill (Northern Diamonds)

- Southern Vipers won the toss and elected to field.

=== Tournament statistics ===
==== Batting ====
Player	Matches	Innings	Runs	Average	High score	100s	50s
Lauren Winfield-Hill	7	7	470	78.33	125*	1	5
Hollie Armitage	7	7	343	68.60	131*	1	1
Bess Heath	7	7	241	40.16	70	0	3
Sterre Kalis	7	7	114	19.00	46	0	0

Source: ESPN Cricinfo Qualification: 100 runs.

==== Bowling ====
Player	Matches	Overs	Wickets	Average	Economy	BBI	5wi
Linsey Smith	7	69.0	13	18.07	3.40	3/34	0
Katie Levick	7	65.5	12	23.08	4.20	4/41	0
Hollie Armitage	7	32.2	11	15.27	5.19	3/37	0
Leigh Kasperek	7	52.0	9	27.00	4.67	3/39	0
Emma Marlow	6	50.0	7	33.28	4.66	3/40	0

Source: ESPN Cricinfo Qualification: 5 wickets.

== Season statistics ==
=== Batting ===
Player	Rachael Heyhoe Flint Trophy								Charlotte Edwards Cup							
Player	Matches	Innings	Runs	High score	Average	Strike rate	100s	50s	Matches	Innings	Runs	High score	Average	Strike rate	100s	50s
Hollie Armitage	7	7	343	131*	68.60	87.27	1	1	6	6	151	48*	37.75	96.17	0	0
Katherine Brunt	1	–	–	–	–	–	–	–	2	2	18	10*	–	150.00	0	0
Leah Dobson	3	3	46	34*	23.00	61.33	0	0	3	2	13	7	6.50	81.25	0	0
Abigail Glen	–	–	–	–	–	–	–	–	4	4	39	25	9.75	100.00	0	0
Yvonne Graves	2	2	15	15	7.50	36.58	0	0	1	–	–	–	–	–	–	–
Jenny Gunn	2	1	41	41*	–	53.24	0	0	1	–	–	–	–	–	–	–
Bess Heath	7	7	241	70	40.16	89.92	0	0	5	5	146	60	29.20	116.80	0	2
Mariko Hill	–	–	–	–	–	–	–	–	2	1	1	1*	–	25.00	0	0
Rachel Hopkins	–	–	–	–	–	–	–	–	1	–	–	–	–	–	–	–
Sterre Kalis	7	7	114	46	19.00	67.05	0	0	4	4	106	39	26.50	98.14	0	0
Leigh Kasperek	7	7	47	31	9.40	50.00	0	0	6	5	13	7	3.25	118.18	0	0
Beth Langston	2	2	13	7*	13.00	54.16	0	0	1	1	1	1	1.00	25.00	0	0
Katie Levick	7	3	29	28	29.00	63.04	0	0	6	2	10	10*	10.00	83.33	0	0
Emma Marlow	6	3	8	6	2.66	33.33	0	0	5	2	10	10	5.00	66.66	0	0
Nat Sciver	–	–	–	–	–	–	–	–	3	3	56	50	18.66	100.00	0	1
Lizzie Scott	3	3	12	12*	12.00	133.33	0	0	–	–	–	–	–	–	–	–
Rachel Slater	4	1	14	14*	–	51.85	0	0	4	1	6	6	6.00	54.54	0	0
Linsey Smith	7	7	66	27	9.42	42.30	0	0	6	6	53	25	10.60	85.48	0	0
Phoebe Turner	4	4	20	11	5.00	37.73	0	0	4	3	35	19	11.66	94.59	0	0
Lauren Winfield-Hill	7	7	470	125*	78.33	94.56	1	5	2	2	96	96	48.00	174.54	0	1
Jessica Woolston	1	–	–	–	–	–	–	–	–	–	–	–	–	–	–	–
Source: ESPN Cricinfo

=== Bowling ===
Player	Rachael Heyhoe Flint Trophy							Charlotte Edwards Cup						
Player	Matches	Overs	Wickets	Average	Economy	BBI	5wi	Matches	Overs	Wickets	Average	Economy	BBI	5wi
Hollie Armitage	7	32.2	11	15.27	5.19	3/37	0	6	6.0	4	10.25	6.83	4/27	0
Katherine Brunt	1	8.0	0	–	5.62	–	0	2	4.0	0	–	5.50	–	0
Abigail Glen	–	–	–	–	–	–	–	4	5.0	2	23.00	9.20	1/12	0
Jenny Gunn	2	14.0	1	44.00	3.14	1/33	0	1	–	–	–	–	–	–
Mariko Hill	–	–	–	–	–	–	–	2	3.0	0	–	11.66	–	0
Leigh Kasperek	7	52.0	9	27.00	4.67	3/39	0	6	17.0	5	26.60	7.82	2/16	0
Beth Langston	2	8.0	0	–	4.00	–	0	1	4.0	2	11.00	5.50	2/22	0
Katie Levick	7	65.5	12	23.08	4.20	4/41	0	6	20.0	15	9.06	6.80	5/15	1
Emma Marlow	6	50.0	7	33.28	4.66	3/40	0	5	17.0	7	12.00	4.94	2/12	0
Nat Sciver	–	–	–	–	–	–	–	3	7.0	0	–	6.28	–	0
Lizzie Scott	3	21.0	3	36.33	5.19	1/10	0	–	–	–	–	–	–	–
Rachel Slater	4	16.0	2	34.50	4.31	1/16	0	4	11.0	1	83.00	7.54	1/22	0
Linsey Smith	7	69.0	13	18.07	3.40	3/34	0	6	22.4	8	15.87	5.60	3/18	0
Jessica Woolston	1	4.0	0	–	4.75	–	0	–	–	–	–	–	–	–
Source: ESPN Cricinfo

=== Fielding ===
Player	Rachael Heyhoe Flint Trophy			Charlotte Edwards Cup		
Player	Matches	Innings	Catches	Matches	Innings	Catches
Hollie Armitage	7	7	5	6	6	5
Katherine Brunt	1	1	0	2	2	0
Leah Dobson	3	3	0	3	3	0
Abigail Glen	–	–	–	4	4	0
Yvonne Graves	2	2	0	1	1	0
Jenny Gunn	2	2	1	1	1	0
Bess Heath	7	7	3	5	–	–
Mariko Hill	–	–	–	2	2	0
Rachel Hopkins	–	–	–	1	1	0
Sterre Kalis	7	7	6	4	4	0
Leigh Kasperek	7	7	2	6	6	1
Beth Langston	2	2	0	1	1	1
Katie Levick	7	7	0	6	6	0
Emma Marlow	6	6	3	5	5	1
Nat Sciver	–	–	–	3	3	3
Lizzie Scott	3	3	0	–	–	–
Rachel Slater	4	4	1	4	4	1
Linsey Smith	7	7	2	6	6	2
Phoebe Turner	4	4	1	4	4	3
Lauren Winfield-Hill	7	–	–	2	1	1
Jessica Woolston	1	1	0	–	–	–
Source: ESPN Cricinfo

=== Wicket-keeping ===
Player	Rachael Heyhoe Flint Trophy				Charlotte Edwards Cup			
Player	Matches	Innings	Catches	Stumpings	Matches	Innings	Catches	Stumpings
Bess Heath	7	–	–	–	5	5	2	1
Lauren Winfield-Hill	7	7	7	6	2	1	0	1
Source: ESPN Cricinfo
