= 2023 Charlotte Edwards Cup =

English cricket season

- Dates: 18 May 2023 – 11 June 2023
- Administrator: England and Wales Cricket Board
- Cricket format: Twenty20
- Tournament format(s): Round-robin and knock-out finals
- Champions: Southern Vipers (2nd title)
- Participants: 8
- Matches: 30
- Most runs: Danni Wyatt (273)
- Most wickets: Nadine de Klerk (15)
- Official website: ECB

The 2023 Charlotte Edwards Cup was the third edition of the Charlotte Edwards Cup, an English women's cricket Twenty20 domestic competition, which took place between 18 May and 11 June 2023. It featured eight teams playing in a round-robin group stage, followed by a Finals Day. It ran alongside the Rachael Heyhoe Flint Trophy, as well as featuring double-header matches with the men's T20 Blast. Southern Vipers, who were the defending champions, won the tournament, beating The Blaze in the final.

== Format ==
Teams played each other once in a group of eight, with the top three qualifying for the knock-out stage. This represented an addition of one match per team from the previous season, which saw teams divided into two groups of four. The top three teams in the group advanced to Finals Day, which was played at New Road, Worcester, with the top-placed team advancing directly to the final and the other two teams playing in the semi-final. 20 group stage matches were played as double-headers with matches from the men's T20 Blast.

== Teams ==
The teams were as listed below. The Blaze changed their name prior to the 2023 season, having previously been known as Lightning.

- Central Sparks (representing Warwickshire, Worcestershire, Herefordshire, Shropshire and Staffordshire)
- Northern Diamonds (representing Yorkshire, Durham and Northumberland)
- North West Thunder (representing Lancashire, Cheshire and Cumbria)
- South East Stars (representing Surrey and Kent)
- Southern Vipers (representing Hampshire, Sussex, Berkshire, Buckinghamshire, Dorset, Isle of Wight and Oxfordshire)
- Sunrisers (representing Middlesex, Essex, Northamptonshire, Bedfordshire, Cambridgeshire, Hertfordshire, Huntingdonshire, Norfolk and Suffolk)
- The Blaze (representing Derbyshire, Leicestershire, Nottinghamshire and Lincolnshire)
- Western Storm (representing Glamorgan, Gloucestershire, Somerset, Cornwall, Devon, Wiltshire and Cricket Wales)

== Standings ==
Teams received 4 points for a win. A bonus point was given where the winning team's run rate is 1.25 or greater times that of the opposition. In case of a tie in the standings, the following tiebreakers were applied in order: highest net run rate, team that scored the most points in matches involving the tied parties, better bowling strike rate, drawing of lots.

Pos	Team	Pld	W	L	T	NR	BP	Pts	NRR
1	The Blaze (Q)	7	7	0	0	0	4	32	1.765
2	Southern Vipers (Q)	7	5	2	0	0	2	22	0.940
3	North West Thunder (Q)	7	4	3	0	0	2	18	0.331
4	Northern Diamonds	7	4	3	0	0	1	17	−0.129
5	South East Stars	7	3	4	0	0	0	12	−0.096
6	Western Storm	7	3	4	0	0	0	12	−0.512
7	Central Sparks	7	2	5	0	0	0	8	−0.558
8	Sunrisers	7	0	7	0	0	0	0	−1.717

Source: England and Wales Cricket Board

advanced to Final advanced to the Semi-final

== Fixtures ==
=== Group stage ===
18 May 2023
18:30 BST (D/N)
Scorecard

Central Sparks; 137 (19.5 overs)	v	Sunrisers; 114 (19 overs)
Amy Jones 51 (34); Kelly Castle 3/24 (4 overs)		Cordelia Griffith 53 (46); Emily Arlott 4/23 (4 overs)

Central Sparks won by 23 runs
County Ground, Chelmsford
Umpires: Billy Taylor and Sue Redfern

- Sunrisers won the toss and elected to field.
- Points: Central Sparks 4, Sunrisers 0.

19 May 2023
18:30 BST (D/N)
Scorecard

Northern Diamonds; 218/3 (20 overs)	v	Western Storm; 186/8 (20 overs)
Lauren Winfield-Hill 98 (56); Orla Prendergast 1/32 (4 overs)		Danielle Gibson 52 (30); Katie Levick 2/25 (3 overs)

Northern Diamonds won by 32 runs
Headingley Cricket Ground, Leeds
Umpires: Grace Bambury and Hassan Adnan

- Western Storm won the toss and elected to field.
- Points: Northern Diamonds 4, Western Storm 0.

20 May 2023
14:30 BST
Scorecard

South East Stars; 160/8 (20 overs)	v	The Blaze; 161/5 (19.2 overs)
Phoebe Franklin 53 (43); Nadine de Klerk 3/21 (3 overs)		Georgie Boyce 63* (38); Paige Scholfield 2/26 (4 overs)

The Blaze won by 5 wickets
County Ground, Beckenham
Umpires: Chris Watts and Rose Dovey

- The Blaze won the toss and elected to field.
- Points: The Blaze 4, South East Stars 0.

21 May 2023
14:30 BST
Scorecard

North West Thunder; 154/7 (20 overs)	v	Western Storm; 155/4 (19.2 overs)
Emma Lamb 36 (22); Orla Prendergast 2/36 (4 overs)		Heather Knight 62 (41); Sophie Ecclestone 2/29 (4 overs)

Western Storm won by 6 wickets
County Ground, Taunton
Umpires: Ben Peverall and Sophie McLelland

- North West Thunder won the toss and elected to bat.
- Points: Western Storm 4, North West Thunder 0

23 May 2023
11:00 BST
Scorecard

Northern Diamonds; 135 (19.3 overs)	v	Central Sparks; 132/7 (20 overs)
Leah Dobson 41 (25); Georgia Davis 3/13 (4 overs)		Evelyn Jones 30 (34); Chloe Tryon 3/30 (4 overs)

Northern Diamonds won by 3 runs
Edgbaston Cricket Ground, Birmingham
Umpires: Anna Harris and Anthony Harris

- Central Sparks won the toss and elected to field.
- Points: Northern Diamonds 4, Central Sparks 0

23 May 2023
11:00 BST
Scorecard

South East Stars; 169/6 (20 overs)	v	Southern Vipers; 171/4 (18.5 overs)
Bryony Smith 83 (47); Lauren Bell 2/25 (4 overs)		Danni Wyatt 40 (20); Freya Davies 1/18 (2 overs)

Southern Vipers won by 6 wickets
Falkland Cricket Club, Newbury
Umpires: Ben Peverall and Rose Dovey

- Southern Vipers won the toss and elected to field.
- Points: Southern Vipers 4, South East Stars 0

25 May 2023
14:15 BST
Scorecard

Sunrisers; 132/8 (20 overs)	v	South East Stars; 135/6 (19 overs)
Eva Gray 34* (24); Paige Scholfield 3/24 (4 overs)		Bryony Smith 38 (27); Grace Scrivens 2/22 (4 overs)

South East Stars won by 4 wickets
Lord's, London
Umpires: Rose Dovey and Surendiran Shanmugam

- Sunrisers won the toss and elected to bat.
- Points: South East Stars 4, Sunrisers 0

25 May 2023
16:30 BST
Scorecard

North West Thunder; 117/6 (20 overs)	v	The Blaze; 120/7 (15.2 overs)
Liberty Heap 26 (32); Grace Ballinger 2/23 (4 overs)		Tammy Beaumont 38 (21); Sophie Ecclestone 2/18 (4 overs)

The Blaze won by 3 wickets
Old Trafford Cricket Ground, Manchester
Umpires: Naeem Ashraf and Waseem Mohammed

- The Blaze won the toss and elected to field.
- Points: The Blaze 5, North West Thunder 0

26 May 2023
13:00 BST
Scorecard

The Blaze; 212/5 (20 overs)	v	Central Sparks; 156/6 (20 overs)
Nat Sciver-Brunt 96* (50); Issy Wong 2/39 (4 overs)		Amy Jones 55 (39); Nadine de Klerk 2/26 (4 overs)

The Blaze won by 56 runs
Grace Road, Leicester
Umpires: Rose Dovey and Jack Shantry

- Central Sparks won the toss and elected to field.
- Points: The Blaze 5, Central Sparks 0

26 May 2023
13:45 BST
Scorecard

South East Stars; 138/7 (20 overs)	v	Northern Diamonds; 140/8 (20 overs)
Alice Capsey 71 (48); Grace Hall 3/20 (4 overs)		Hollie Armitage 82 (59); Claudie Cooper 3/12 (4 overs)

Northern Diamonds won by 2 wickets
The Oval, London
Umpires: Anna Harris and Ben Debenham

- Northern Diamonds won the toss and elected to field.
- Points: Northern Diamonds 4, South East Stars 0

26 May 2023
15:00 BST
Scorecard

Western Storm; 105/8 (20 overs)	v	Southern Vipers; 107/3 (14.1 overs)
Sophie Luff 44 (46); Lauren Bell 3/19 (4 overs)		Maia Bouchier 45 (41); Lauren Filer 1/12 (3 overs)

Southern Vipers won by 7 wickets
Rose Bowl, Southampton
Umpires: Paul Nicholls and Ben Peverall

- Western Storm won the toss and elected to bat.
- Points: Southern Vipers 5, Western Storm 0

27 May 2023
14:30 BST
Scorecard

Sunrisers; 116/8 (20 overs)	v	North West Thunder; 119/3 (16.3 overs)
Cordelia Griffith 36 (35); Kate Cross 2/20 (4 overs)		Liberty Heap 46 (49); Mady Villiers 1/12 (2 overs)

North West Thunder won by 7 wickets
Old Trafford Cricket Ground, Manchester
Umpires: Anthony Harris and Naeem Ashraf

- Sunrisers won the toss and elected to bat.
- Points: North West Thunder 4, Sunrisers 0

28 May 2023
14:30 BST
Scorecard

South East Stars; 126/6 (20 overs)	v	Western Storm; 121 (19.5 overs)
Alice Davidson-Richards 43 (45); Orla Prendergast 2/12 (4 overs)		Sophie Luff 43* (46); Freya Davies 2/14 (3.5 overs)

South East Stars won by 5 runs
County Ground, Taunton
Umpires: Rose Dovey and Ben Peverall

- Western Storm won the toss and elected to field.
- Points: South East Stars 4, Western Storm 0

28 May 2023
15:30 BST
Scorecard

Northern Diamonds; 172/7 (20 overs)	v	Sunrisers; 137 (18.4 overs)
Leah Dobson 47 (40); Grace Scrivens 2/24 (4 overs)		Grace Scrivens 50 (35); Katie Levick 5/19 (4 overs)

Northern Diamonds won by 35 runs
Headingley Cricket Ground, Leeds
Umpires: Phil Mustard and Simon Widdup

- Northern Diamonds won the toss and elected to bat.
- Points: Northern Diamonds 5, Sunrisers 0

29 May 2023
10:30 BST
Scorecard

North West Thunder; 155/6 (20 overs)	v	Central Sparks; 119/9 (20 overs)
Emma Lamb 64 (49); Bethan Ellis 2/22 (4 overs)		Erin Burns 41 (23); Fi Morris 2/16 (4 overs)

North West Thunder won by 36 runs
New Road, Worcester
Umpires: Jack Shantry and Rose Dovey

- Central Sparks won the toss and elected to field.
- Points: North West Thunder 5, Central Sparks 0

29 May 2023
11:00 BST
Scorecard

Southern Vipers; 118 (19.3 overs)	v	The Blaze; 119/5 (19.4 overs)
Georgia Adams 31 (27); Nadine de Klerk 2/10 (3.3 overs)		Tammy Beaumont 49* (40); Linsey Smith 2/19 (4 overs)

The Blaze won by 5 wickets
County Ground, Derby
Umpires: Hassan Adnan and Simon Widdup

- The Blaze won the toss and elected to field.
- Points: The Blaze 4, Southern Vipers 0

31 May 2023
14:30 BST
Scorecard

Sunrisers; 149/6 (20 overs)	v	Western Storm; 150/3 (18.2 overs)
Jo Gardner 37* (29); Chloe Skelton 2/19 (4 overs)		Danielle Gibson 62 (46); Mady Villiers 1/20 (4 over)

Western Storm won by 7 wickets
County Ground, Northampton
Umpires: Anthony Harris and Sue Redfern

- Western Storm won the toss and elected to field.
- Points: Western Storm 4, Sunrisers 0

31 May 2023
15:00 BST
Scorecard

North West Thunder; 111 (18.5 overs)	v	Southern Vipers; 115/6 (16.1 overs)
Deandra Dottin 24 (28); Linsey Smith 2/16 (4 overs)		Ella McCaughan 42 (37); Olivia Bell 2/29 (3.1 overs)

Southern Vipers won by 4 wickets
Rose Bowl, Southampton
Umpires: Fiona Richards and James Tredwell

- North West Thunder won the toss and elected to bat.
- Points: Southern Vipers 4, North West Thunder 0

2 June 2023
14:30 BST
Scorecard

Northern Diamonds; 129/7 (20 overs)	v	The Blaze; 133/4 (15.4 overs)
Lauren Winfield-Hill 40 (47); Nadine de Klerk 3/31 (4 overs)		Sarah Bryce 67* (43); Abigail Glen 2/23 (3 overs)

The Blaze won by 6 wickets
Riverside Ground, Chester-le-Street
Umpires: Joanne Ibbotson and Simon Widdup

- Northern Diamonds won the toss and elected to bat.
- Points: The Blaze 5, Northern Diamonds 0

3 June 2023
14:30 BST
Scorecard

Central Sparks; 142/9 (20 overs)	v	Southern Vipers; 135/8 (20 overs)
Amy Jones 45 (34); Charlie Dean 3/27 (4 overs)		Danni Wyatt 68 (49); Bethan Ellis 4/29 (4 overs)

Central Sparks won by 7 runs
Edgbaston Cricket Ground, Birmingham
Umpires: Anthony Harris and Grace Bambury

- Central Sparks won the toss and elected to bat.
- Points: Central Sparks 4, Southern Vipers 0

4 June 2023
10:30 BST
Scorecard

Central Sparks; 135/6 (20 overs)	v	Western Storm; 137/3 (19.2 overs)
Erin Burns 66 (45); Danielle Gibson 4/23 (4 overs)		Orla Prendergast 46* (43); Hannah Baker 1/21 (4 overs)

Western Storm won by 7 wickets
County Ground, Bristol
Umpires: Rose Dovery and Sophie McLelland

- Central Sparks won the toss and elected to bat.
- Points: Western Storm 4, Central Sparks 0

4 June 2023
11:00 BST
Scorecard

The Blaze; 198/6 (20 overs)	v	Sunrisers; 114 (20 overs)
Nat Sciver-Brunt 58 (30); Eva Gray 2/29 (3 overs)		Grace Scrivens 20 (26); Sarah Glenn 2/9 (3 overs)

The Blaze won by 84 runs
Trent Bridge, Nottingham
Umpires: Anthony Harris and James Tredwell

- The Blaze won the toss and elected to bat.
- Points: The Blaze 5, Sunrisers 0

4 June 2023
14:30 BST
Scorecard

North West Thunder; 165/5 (20 overs)	v	South East Stars; 149 (19.2 overs)
Emma Lamb 63 (38); Danielle Gregory 2/14 (3 overs)		Bryony Smith 51 (32); Tara Norris 2/2 (1.2 overs)

North West Thunder won by 16 runs
Stanley Park, Blackpool
Umpires: Naeem Ashraf and Neil Pratt

- North West Thunder won the toss and elected to bat.
- Points: North West Thunder 4, South East Stars 0

4 June 2023
15:30 BST
Scorecard

Southern Vipers; 144/6 (20 overs)	v	Northern Diamonds; 128/9 (20 overs)
Georgia Adams 42* (42); Katie Levick 2/12 (4 overs)		Sterre Kalis 32 (36); Anya Shrubsole 4/18 (4 overs)

Southern Vipers won by 16 runs
Headingley Cricket Ground, Leeds
Umpires: Joanne Ibbotson and Simon Widdup

- Southern Vipers won the toss and elected to bat.
- Points: Southern Vipers 4, Northern Diamonds 0

7 June 2023
11:00 BST
Scorecard

Northern Diamonds; 96 (18.4 overs)	v	North West Thunder; 97/3 (15 overs)
Sterre Kalis 24 (28); Olivia Bell 3/9 (3 overs)		Fi Morris 42* (34); Katherine Fraser 1/14 (3 overs)

North West Thunder won by 7 wickets
Stanley Park, Blackpool
Umpires: Naeem Ashraf and Jasmine Naeem

- Northern Diamonds won the toss and elected to bat.
- Points: North West Thunder 5, Northern Diamonds 0

7 June 2023
14:00 BST
Scorecard

South East Stars; 176/6 (20 overs)	v	Central Sparks; 170 (19.3 overs)
Phoebe Franklin 52 (27); Georgia Davis 3/12 (4 overs)		Katie George 53 (34); Bryony Smith 3/23 (3.3 overs)

South East Stars won by 6 runs
St Lawrence Ground, Canterbury
Umpires: Fiona Richards and James Tredwell

- Central Sparks won the toss and elected to field.
- Points: South East Stars 4, Central Sparks 0

7 June 2023
14:30 BST
Scorecard

Western Storm; 134/7 (20 overs)	v	The Blaze; 137/3 (18.4 overs)
Emma Corney 23 (32); Kathryn Bryce 2/17 (4 overs)		Kathryn Bryce 54* (37); Claire Nicholas 2/24 (4 overs)

The Blaze won by 7 wickets
Sophia Gardens, Cardiff
Umpires: Anna Harris and Ben Peverall

- The Blaze won the toss and elected to field.
- Points: The Blaze 4, Western Storm 0

7 June 2023
19:00 BST (D/N)
Scorecard

Sunrisers; 114/7 (20 overs)	v	Southern Vipers; 115/5 (14.5 overs)
Cordelia Griffith 65 (56); Linsey Smith 3/13 (4 overs)		Georgia Adams 63* (33); Mady Villiers 3/15 (4 overs)

Southern Vipers won by 5 wickets
County Ground, Hove
Umpires: Rose Dovey and Surendiran Shanmugam

- Southern Vipers won the toss and elected to field.
- Points: Southern Vipers 5, Sunrisers 0

=== Finals Day ===
Semi-Final			Final
			1	The Blaze	114/8
2	Southern Vipers	191/6	2	Southern Vipers	118/3
3	North West Thunder	173/8

==== Semi-final ====
10 June 2023
12:00 BST
Scorecard

Southern Vipers; 191/6 (20 overs)	v	North West Thunder; 173/8 (20 overs)
Danni Wyatt 76 (50); Olivia Bell 4/37 (4 overs)		Fi Morris 36 (25); Georgia Adams 2/26 (3 overs)

Southern Vipers won by 18 runs
New Road, Worcester
Umpires: Rose Dovey and Sue Redfern
Player of the match: Danni Wyatt (Southern Vipers)

- North West Thunder won the toss and elected to field.

==== Final ====
10 & 11 June 2023
16:00 BST
Scorecard

The Blaze; 114/8 (20 overs)	v	Southern Vipers; 118/3 (14.2 overs)
Marie Kelly 26* (36); Georgia Adams 2/20 (4 overs)		Danni Wyatt 50 (28); Lucy Higham 1/16 (2 overs)

Southern Vipers won by 7 wickets
New Road, Worcester
Umpires: Anna Harris and Sue Redfern
Player of the match: Anya Shrubsole (Southern Vipers)

- The Blaze won the toss and elected to bat.
- Rain interrupted The Blaze innings at 53/4 from 9.3 overs on 10 June. Play resumed on the reserve day on 11 June.

== Statistics ==
- Highest score by a team: Northern Diamonds – 218/3 (20 overs) v Western Storm (19 May).
- Top score by an individual: Lauren Winfield-Hill – 98 (56) v Western Storm (19 May).
- Best bowling figures by an individual: Katie Levick – 5/19 (4 overs) v Sunrisers (28 May).

=== Most runs ===
Player	Team	Matches	Innings	Runs	Average	HS	100s	50s
Danni Wyatt	Southern Vipers	6	6	273	45.50	76	0	3
Bryony Smith	South East Stars	7	7	256	36.57	83	0	2
Georgia Adams	Southern Vipers	9	9	249	49.80	63*	0	1
Hollie Armitage	Northern Diamonds	7	7	216	30.85	82	0	2
Fi Morris	North West Thunder	8	8	209	29.85	44	0	0

Source: ESPNCricinfo

=== Most wickets ===
Player	Team	Overs	Wickets	Average	BBI	5w
Nadine de Klerk	The Blaze	28.3	15	11.40	3/21	0
Anya Shrubsole	Southern Vipers	28.5	13	13.15	4/18	0
Linsey Smith	Southern Vipers	36.0	13	14.07	3/13	0
Katie Levick	Northern Diamonds	23.0	12	12.00	5/19	1
Olivia Bell	North West Thunder	12.1	11	8.27	4/37	0

Source: ESPNCricinfo
