= Jessica Woolston =

English cricketer

Personal information
- Full name: Jessica Ann Woolston
- Born: 25 February 2003 (age 23); Stockton-on-Tees, Durham, England
- Batting: Right-handed
- Bowling: Right-arm medium
- Role: Bowler

Domestic team information
- Years: Team
- 2017: Durham
- 2021–2024: Yorkshire
- 2022–2024: Northern Diamonds

Career statistics
Competition	WLA	WT20
Matches	20	14
Runs scored	88	61
Batting average	12.57	20.33
100s/50s	0/0	0/0
Top score	26	21*
Balls bowled	630	179
Wickets	20	6
Bowling average	24.40	35.33
5 wickets in innings	1	0
10 wickets in match	0	0
Best bowling	5/37	2/19
Catches/stumpings	8/–	3/–
- Source: CricketArchive, 17 October 2024

Jessica Ann Woolston (born 25 February 2003) is an English cricketer who most recently played for Yorkshire and Northern Diamonds. She plays primarily as a right-arm medium bowler. She previously played for Durham.

== Early life ==
Woolston was born on 25 February 2003 in Stockton-on-Tees, County Durham.

== Domestic career ==
Woolston made her county debut in 2017, for Durham against Cumbria in the Women's County Championship. She went on to play one more match for Durham in the County Championship, scoring 26 against Northumberland. She also appeared in two matches for Durham in the 2017 Women's Twenty20 Cup.

Woolston next played in the 2021 Women's Twenty20 Cup, playing two matches for Yorkshire. She played seven matches for Yorkshire in the 2022 Women's Twenty20 Cup, taking one wicket.

Woolston was named in the Northern Diamonds Academy squad in 2021. She was again named in the Academy squad in 2022, and took 3/12 from 3 overs in a match against Western Storm Academy in July. She was added to the first team squad in September 2022, first being named in a matchday squad on 16 September 2022. She made her debut for Northern Diamonds on 17 September 2022, in the Rachael Heyhoe Flint Trophy against Southern Vipers. In 2023, she played 12 matches for Northern Diamonds, all in the Rachael Heyhoe Flint Trophy, taking 13 wickets at an average of 23.23. In May 2023, against South East Stars, she took her maiden List A five-wicket haul, with 5/37 from 9 overs. In 2024, she played four matches for Northern Diamonds, all in the Rachael Heyhoe Flint Trophy, taking three wickets at an average of 40.33.
