= Durham Women cricket team =

British cricket team

Durham Women

Personnel
- Captain: Hollie Armitage
- Coach: Danielle Hazell
- Overseas player: TBA

Team information
- Founded: Unknown First recorded match: 1930
- Home ground: Riverside Ground, Chester-le-Street

History
- WCC wins: 0
- T20 Cup wins: 0
- Official website: Durham Cricket

The Durham Women cricket team is the women's representative cricket team for the English historic county of Durham. They play their home games at the Riverside Ground in Chester-le-Street, having previously used various grounds across the county, including Green Lane Cricket Ground, Durham and Park Drive, Hartlepool. They competed in the Women's County Championship from 2001 to 2019 and in the Women's Twenty20 Cup from 2009 to 2019. In 2020, it was announced that Durham was merging its team with Northumberland, becoming North East Warriors. They were partnered with the regional side Northern Diamonds.

In 2024, Durham were selected as one of the eight counties to become a 'tier 1' professional women's cricket side from 2025, with all home matches to be played at the Riverside Ground.

== History ==
=== 1930–2000: Early History ===
Durham Women played their first recorded match in 1930, against Lancashire and Cheshire Women, which they won by 16 runs. Over the following years, Durham played various one-off matches against surrounding teams, often combined with Northumberland Women. In the early 2000s, Durham also played various games against Scotland Women.

=== 2001– : Women's County Championship ===
In 2001, Durham Women played in the Emerging Counties competition, which they won, thereby earning promotion to the Women's County Championship. In their first season, they finished 5th in Division 3, but were promoted the following season. After being relegated in 2004, Durham then began a steady climb through the divisions, reaching Division 2 in 2012, where they remained for four seasons. Subsequent years saw them challenging for promotion again, just missing out in 2017, losing a play-off against Northamptonshire, but achieving it in 2018, beating Oxfordshire by 85 runs. In 2019, however, they finished bottom of Division Two. In the Women's Twenty20 Cup, meanwhile, Durham were a consistent Division Two side, achieving their best finish, 2nd, in 2019. In 2021, they competed as a joint team with Northumberland, as North East Warriors, after the two teams merged in 2020.

== Players ==
=== Current squad ===
- No. denotes the player's squad number, as worn on the back of their shirt.
- ‡ denotes players with international caps.

No.	Name	Nationality	Birth date	Batting style	Bowling style	Notes
Batters
4	Emily Windsor	England	14 June 1997 (age 29)	Right-handed	Right-arm medium	
7	Emma Marlow	England	12 April 2004 (age 22)	Right-handed	Right-arm off break	
10	Leah Dobson	England	6 October 2001 (age 24)	Right-handed	Right-arm medium	
28	Harriet Robson	England	27 December 2003 (age 22)	Right-handed	Right-arm off break	
All-rounders
14	Trudy Johnson	England	2 November 2006 (age 19)	Right-handed	Right-arm medium	
15	Abi Glen	England	2 April 2001 (age 25)	Right-handed	Right-arm medium	
17	Phoebe Turner	England	8 August 2003 (age 23)	Right-handed	Right-arm medium	
22	Mady Villiers ‡	England	26 August 1998 (age 28)	Right-handed	Right-arm off break	
57	Hollie Armitage ‡	England	14 June 1997 (age 29)	Right-handed	Right-arm leg break	
70	Katherine Fraser ‡	Scotland	9 April 2005 (age 21)	Right-handed	Right-arm off break	
Wicket-keepers
25	Bess Heath ‡	England	20 August 2001 (age 25)	Right-handed	—	
64	Mia Rogers	England	29 January 2002 (age 24)	Right-handed	—	
Bowlers
2	Lizzie Scott	England	1 September 2004 (age 22)	Right-handed	Right-arm medium	
23	Katie Levick	England	18 July 1991 (age 35)	Right-handed	Right-arm leg break	
24	Lauren Filer ‡	England	22 December 2000 (age 25)	Right-handed	Right-arm fast-medium	England central contract
48	Sophia Turner	England	23 April 2003 (age 23)	Right-handed	Right-arm medium	
88	Grace Thompson	England	30 May 2007 (age 19)	Right-handed	Right-arm medium	
Source: Updated: 1 October 2026

=== Notable players ===
Players who have played for Durham and played internationally are listed below, in order of first international appearance (given in brackets):

- (Scotland) Kari Carswell (2001)
- (England) Danielle Hazell (2009)
- (New Zealand) Morna Nielsen (2010)
- (Ireland) Louise McCarthy (2010)
- (Scotland) Becky Glen (2018)
- (Cricket West Indies) (Barbados) Aaliyah Alleyne (Note: Alleyne has represented both the West Indies and Barbados in international cricket.) (2019)
- (Hong Kong) Elysa Hubbard (2022)

== Seasons ==
=== Women's County Championship ===
Season	Division	League standings								Notes
Season	Division	P	W	L	T	A/C	BP	Pts	Pos	Notes
2001	Emerging Counties	2	-	-	-	-	-	-	1st	Promoted
2002	Division 3	5	1	2	0	2	20	54	5th	
2003	Division 3	5	3	1	1	0	40.5	82.5	1st	Promoted
2004	Division 2	5	0	5	0	0	23	23	6th	Relegated
2005	County Challenge Cup G1	3	3	0	0	0	28	64	2nd	
2006	County Challenge Cup G1	3	2	1	0	0	4	44	2nd	
2007	County Challenge Cup G4	3	1	1	0	1	4	39	2nd	
2008	Division 5N	3	2	1	0	0	2	42	2nd	Promoted
2009	Division 4	10	8	2	0	0	5	165	2nd	
2010	Division 4	9	4	4	0	1	39	79	5th	
2011	Division 4	10	7	2	0	1	61	131	1st	Promoted
2012	Division 2	8	0	5	0	3	15	15	9th	
2013	Division 2	8	1	5	0	2	26	36	9th	
2014	Division 2	8	2	6	0	0	35	55	7th	
2015	Division 2	8	3	5	0	0	38	68	8th	Relegated
2016	Division 3	8	6	1	0	1	42	102	2nd	
2017	Division 3A	6	5	0	0	1	26	76	1st	Lost promotion playoff
2018	Division 3A	6	5	1	0	0	42	92	1st	Promoted
2019	Division 2	7	1	6	0	0	36	46	8th	Relegated

=== Women's Twenty20 Cup ===
Season	Division	League standings								Notes
Season	Division	P	W	L	T	A/C	NRR	Pts	Pos	Notes
2009	Division 6	3	0	0	0	3	–	3	1st	
2010	Division M&N 2	3	0	2	0	1	−1.73	1	4th	Relegated
2011	Division M&N 3	3	2	1	0	0	+1.00	4	2nd	Lost promotion play-off
2012	Division M&N 3	3	1	2	0	0	−1.27	2	3rd	
2014	Division 2B	4	1	3	0	0	−2.99	4	7th	
2015	Division 2	8	2	5	0	1	−0.55	9	7th	
2016	Division 2	7	0	6	0	1	−2.48	1	8th	
2017	Division 2	8	3	5	0	0	−0.21	12	6th	
2018	Division 2	8	5	3	0	0	−0.10	20	4th	
2019	Division 2	8	5	3	0	0	+0.54	20	2nd	

== See also ==
- Durham County Cricket Club
- North East Warriors
- Northern Diamonds
