= Lizzie Scott =

English cricketer

Personal information
- Full name: Lizzie Eleanor Scott
- Born: 1 September 2004 (age 22); Hexham, Northumberland, England
- Batting: Right-handed
- Bowling: Right-arm medium
- Role: Bowler

Domestic team information
- Years: Team
- 2016–2019: Northumberland
- 2020–2024: North East Warriors
- 2022–2024: Northern Diamonds
- 2023: Oval Invincibles
- 2025: Durham

Career statistics
Competition	WLA	WT20
Matches	37	25
Runs scored	256	321
Batting average	12.80	21.40
100s/50s	0/1	0/0
Top score	58	49
Balls bowled	1,251	425
Wickets	35	12
Bowling average	27.80	36.50
5 wickets in innings	1	0
10 wickets in match	0	0
Best bowling	5/24	2/12
Catches/stumpings	2/–	3/–
- Source: CricketArchive, 6 August 2025

Lizzie Eleanor Scott (born 1 September 2004) is an English cricketer who currently plays for Durham. She plays as a right-arm medium bowler. She has previously played for Northumberland, North East Warriors, Northern Diamonds and Oval Invincibles.

== Early life ==
Scott was born on 1 September 2004 in Hexham, Northumberland.

== Domestic career ==
Scott made her county debut in 2016, for Northumberland against Lincolnshire. She scored her maiden half-century in 2017, scoring 58 in a County Championship match against Durham. She was her side's leading run-scorer in the 2018 Women's Twenty20 Cup, with 190 runs in 8 matches. She was Northumberland's leading wicket-taker in the 2019 Women's County Championship, with 12 wickets including her maiden five-wicket haul, 5/24 against Scotland.

In 2020, Northumberland combined with Durham to form North East Warriors. She took five wickets for the side at an average of 18.20 in the 2021 Women's Twenty20 Cup, and three wickets at an average of 28.00 in the 2022 Women's Twenty20 Cup.

Scott was included in the Northern Diamonds Academy squad in 2021 and 2022. She was promoted to the full squad in September 2022, making her debut against Western Storm on 11 September in the Rachael Heyhoe Flint Trophy, taking 1/53. She went on to play two more matches for Diamonds that season, taking two more wickets as her side won the Rachael Heyhoe Flint Trophy.

In 2023, she played 21 matches for Northern Diamonds, across the Rachael Heyhoe Flint Trophy and the Charlotte Edwards Cup, taking 19 wickets. She also played one match for Oval Invincibles in The Hundred. At the end of the 2023 season, it was announced that Scott had signed her first professional contract with Northern Diamonds. In 2024, she played five matches for the side, across the Rachael Heyhoe Flint Trophy and the Charlotte Edwards Cup, taking three wickets.

== International career ==
In October 2022, Scott was selected in the England Under-19 squad for the 2023 ICC Under-19 Women's T20 World Cup. She went on to play three matches in the tournament.
