= Leah Dobson =

English cricketer

Personal information
- Full name: Leah Christie Dobson
- Born: 6 October 2001 (age 25); Scarborough, North Yorkshire, England
- Batting: Right-handed
- Bowling: Right-arm medium
- Role: Batter

Domestic team information
- Years: Team
- 2018–2024: Yorkshire
- 2020–2024: Northern Diamonds
- 2023: Northern Superchargers

Career statistics
Competition	WLA	WT20
Matches	31	41
Runs scored	461	384
Batting average	20.04	13.24
100s/50s	0/2	0/1
Top score	68*	55
Catches/stumpings	4/–	12/–
- Source: CricketArchive, 17 October 2024

Leah Christie Dobson (born 6 October 2001) is an English cricketer who currently plays for Durham. She plays as a right-handed batter.

== Early life ==
Dobson was born on 6 October 2001 in Scarborough, North Yorkshire. At youth level for Yorkshire, she was the Under-17 Batter of the Season in 2018, and hit 161 from 81 balls in an Under-17 T20 match.

== Domestic career ==
Dobson made her county debut in 2018, for Yorkshire against Kent. In 2019, she scored 92 runs at an average of 18.40 in the County Championship, including her career high score of 40 in a 2 wicket victory over Nottinghamshire. She only played one match for Yorkshire in 2021, scoring 4* against North East Warriors before rain cut the match short.

Dobson was selected in the Northern Diamonds squad for the 2020 Rachael Heyhoe Flint Trophy, but did not play a match that season. She made her debut for the side in 2021, in their opening match of the Charlotte Edwards Cup against North West Thunder. She went on to score 111 runs in the tournament for her side, including her Twenty20 high score of 44*. She also played five times in the Rachael Heyhoe Flint Trophy, including scoring 49 against Southern Vipers. Dobson appeared in six matches for Northern Diamonds in 2022 across the Charlotte Edwards Cup and the Rachael Heyhoe Flint Trophy, with a top score of 34* in the Rachael Heyhoe Flint Trophy final, helping Diamonds to their first title. At the end of the 2022 season, it was announced that Dobson had signed her first professional contract with Northern Diamonds.

In 2023, she played 17 matches for Northern Diamonds, across the Rachael Heyhoe Flint Trophy and the Charlotte Edwards Cup, and scored her maiden List A half-century, with 68* against Western Storm. She also played five matches for Northern Superchargers in The Hundred. In 2024, she played 15 matches for Northern Diamonds, across the Rachael Heyhoe Flint Trophy and the Charlotte Edwards Cup, scoring two half-centuries.
