= Grace Hall =

English cricketer

Personal information
- Full name: Grace Elizabeth Hall
- Born: 24 December 2002 (age 23)
- Batting: Right-handed
- Bowling: Right-arm medium
- Role: Bowler

Domestic team information
- Years: Team
- 2021–2024: Yorkshire
- 2022–2024: Northern Diamonds
- 2023: Northern Superchargers

Career statistics
Competition	WLA	WT20
Matches	9	23
Runs scored	49	10
Batting average	16.33	1.42
100s/50s	0/0	0/0
Top score	21*	4*
Balls bowled	316	370
Wickets	11	23
Bowling average	25.54	18.69
5 wickets in innings	0	0
10 wickets in match	0	0
Best bowling	4/33	3/20
Catches/stumpings	1/–	9/–
- Source: CricketArchive, 17 October 2024

Grace Elizabeth Hall (born 24 December 2002) is an English cricketer who most recently played for Yorkshire and Northern Diamonds. She plays as a right-arm medium bowler.

== Domestic career ==
Hall made her county debut in 2021, for Yorkshire against Cumbria, taking 1/19 from her four overs. Overall, she played three matches in 2021, taking two wickets. She played eight matches for Yorkshire in the 2022 Women's Twenty20 Cup, and was the side's leading wicket-taker, with 8 wickets at an average of 20.37.

Hall was named in the Northern Diamonds Academy squad in 2021. She was again named in the academy squad in 2022, and took 3/4 from 1.3 overs in a match against Western Storm Academy in July. She was added to the first team squad in September 2022, first being named in a matchday squad on 16 September 2022, but did not play a match for the side that season. She was retained in the side's squad in 2023. She made her debut for Northern Diamonds on 19 May 2023, in the Charlotte Edwards Cup against Western Storm. She went on to play 15 matches overall for the side that season, taking 21 wickets, including 4/33 in a Rachael Heyhoe Flint Trophy match against South East Stars. She was also signed by Northern Superchargers for The Hundred, but did not play a match. In 2024, she played five matches for Northern Diamonds in the Charlotte Edwards Cup, taking three wickets.
