= Bess Heath =

English cricketer

Personal information
- Full name: Bess Alice May Heath
- Born: 20 August 2001 (age 25); Chesterfield, Derbyshire, England
- Batting: Right-handed
- Role: Wicket-keeper

International information
- National side: England (2023–present)
- ODI debut (cap 145): 14 September 2023 v Sri Lanka
- Last ODI: 9 September 2024 v Ireland
- T20I debut (cap 60): 10 December 2023 v India
- Last T20I: 24 March 2024 v New Zealand
- T20I shirt no.: 10

Domestic team information
- Years: Team
- 2014–2020: Derbyshire
- 2018–2019: Yorkshire Diamonds
- 2020–2024: Northern Diamonds
- 2021–2024: Yorkshire
- 2021–2025: Northern Superchargers
- 2022/23: Melbourne Stars
- 2023/24: Brisbane Heat
- 2026–: Trent Rockets

Career statistics
Competition	WODI	WT20I	WLA	WT20
Matches	4	4	66	133
Runs scored	59	6	1,582	1,757
Batting average	19.66	2.00	32.28	18.11
100s/50s	0/0	0/0	2/11	0/9
Top score	33*	3	114	60
Catches/stumpings	3/1	2/–	39/6	32/22
- Source: CricketArchive, 17 October 2024

Bess Alice May Heath (born 20 August 2001) is an English cricketer who currently plays for Durham, Northern Superchargers and Brisbane Heat. She plays as a wicket-keeper and right-handed batter. She previously played for Derbyshire, Yorkshire and Northern Diamonds, as well as Yorkshire Diamonds in the Women's Cricket Super League and Melbourne Stars in the Women's Big Bash League.

She made her international debut for England in September 2023, in a One Day International against Sri Lanka.

== Early life ==
Heath was born on 20 August 2001 in Chesterfield, Derbyshire.

== Domestic career ==
Heath made her county debut in 2014, for Derbyshire against Scotland. In 2016, Heath hit her maiden county century, scoring 114 against Norfolk. She was Derbyshire's leading run-scorer in the 2017 and 2018 Twenty20 Cups, as well as in the 2018 Women's County Championship, where she hit 210 runs including her second county century, 108 against Northamptonshire.

In 2021, Heath joined Yorkshire for the Twenty20 Cup. She made her debut in the second round of matches, scoring 52* off 36 deliveries against North East Warriors before rain ended the game prematurely. She played one match for the side in the 2022 Women's Twenty20 Cup, scoring 39.

Heath also played for Yorkshire Diamonds in the Women's Cricket Super League in 2018 and 2019. She played 10 matches across the two seasons, scoring 46 runs with a best of 24 in a victory over Loughborough Lightning in 2018.

In 2020, Heath played for Northern Diamonds in the Rachael Heyhoe Flint Trophy. She appeared in all 7 matches, scoring 37 runs and taking 8 catches. Heath missed the beginning of the 2021 regional season due to injury. She returned to play for Northern Superchargers in The Hundred, making six appearances. She returned to the Northern Diamonds squad to play five matches apiece in the Rachael Heyhoe Flint Trophy and the Charlotte Edwards Cup. She scored 103 runs in the Charlotte Edwards Cup, including 58* from 40 balls to help beat North West Thunder and qualify for Finals Day. She also scored two half-centuries in consecutive games in the Rachael Heyhoe Flint Trophy, 78* against North West Thunder and 71 against Southern Vipers. At the end of the 2021 season, it was announced that Heath had signed a professional contract with Northern Diamonds.

She played 12 matches for Northern Diamonds in 2022, across the Charlotte Edwards Cup and the Rachael Heyhoe Flint Trophy, scoring five half-centuries with a top score of 70, against Western Storm. She also scored 44 in the final of the Rachael Heyhoe Flint Trophy, as Diamonds won their first title. She played six matches for Northern Superchargers in The Hundred, and scored one half-century, 57 from 34 deliveries against London Spirit. In 2023, she scored 286 runs in the Rachael Heyhoe Flint Trophy, at an average of 40.85 and with a strike rate of 133.02. She also scored 92 runs at an average of 15.33 in The Hundred. At the end of the season, she was nominated for the PCA Women’s Young Player of the Year award. In 2024, she played 17 matches for Northern Diamonds, across the Rachael Heyhoe Flint Trophy and the Charlotte Edwards Cup, scoring four half-centuries.

In October 2022, Heath signed for Melbourne Stars for the opening matches of the 2022–23 Women's Big Bash League season, as an international replacement player for Jemimah Rodrigues. She played seven matches for the side that season, scoring 128 runs at an average of 21.33 with a high score of 37. She played for Brisbane Heat in the 2023–24 Women's Big Bash League season, scoring 171 runs including one half-century.

== International career ==
In August 2023, Heath was called up to her first England squad, for their series against Sri Lanka. She made her One Day International debut in the final match of the series, on 14 September 2023. In December 2023, she was awarded a development contract by the England and Wales Cricket Board. She also made her Twenty20 International debut in December 2023, against India. She was named in the England squad for the 2024 ICC Women's T20 World Cup. Heath was also among the line-up for the T20 part of their multi-format tour to South Africa in November 2024, but withdrew after suffering a fractured thumb.

She was named in the England squad for the 2025 Women's Ashes series in Australia.
