= Abi Glen =

English cricketer

Personal information
- Full name: Abigail Alice Glen
- Born: 2 April 2001 (age 25); Leeds, England
- Batting: Right-handed
- Bowling: Right-arm medium
- Role: All-rounder

Domestic team information
- Years: Team
- 2018–2024: Yorkshire
- 2022: North Representative XI
- 2022–2024: Northern Diamonds

Career statistics
Competition	WLA	WT20
Matches	21	34
Runs scored	192	337
Batting average	17.45	14.65
100s/50s	0/1	0/1
Top score	53*	52*
Balls bowled	533	440
Wickets	15	24
Bowling average	28.60	21.79
5 wickets in innings	0	0
10 wickets in match	0	0
Best bowling	3/42	2/10
Catches/stumpings	6/–	12/–
- Source: CricketArchive, 17 October 2024

Abigail Alice Glen (born 2 April 2001) is an English cricketer who most recently played for Yorkshire and Northern Diamonds. An all-rounder, she plays as a right-arm medium bowler and right-handed batter.

== Early life ==
Glen was born on 2 April 2001 in Leeds.

== Domestic career ==
Glen made her county debut in 2018, for Yorkshire against Somerset in the County Championship. She took 5 wickets in that season's Twenty20 Cup. She played six matches for the side in 2019, but did not play in 2021. In 2022, she played for both North Representative XI and Yorkshire in the Twenty20 Cup. She took five wickets in the competition, and made her maiden half-century, scoring 52* for Yorkshire against Derbyshire.

Glen was named in the Northern Diamonds squad for the 2022 season. She made her debut for the side on 14 May 2022, against Lightning in the Charlotte Edwards Cup. Overall, she played four matches for the side in 2022, all in the Charlotte Edwards Cup, scoring 39 runs and taking 2 wickets. In 2023, she played 11 matches for Northern Diamonds, across the Rachael Heyhoe Flint Trophy and the Charlotte Edwards Cup, taking 11 wickets. In 2024, she played 13 matches for Northern Diamonds, all in the Rachael Heyhoe Flint Trophy, scoring 180 runs and taking 8 wickets.
