= Simon Widdup =

English cricketer (born 1977)

Personal information
- Born: 10 November 1977 (age 49); Doncaster, Yorkshire, England
- Batting: Right-handed
- Bowling: Right-arm off break
- Role: Umpire

Domestic team information
- Years: Team
- 2000–2001: Yorkshire
- FC debut: 29 June 2000 Yorkshire v Lancashire
- LA debut: 23 July 2000 Yorkshire v Somerset

Umpiring information
- FC umpired: 12 (2024–present)
- LA umpired: 31 (2022–present)
- T20 umpired: 20 (2024–present)

Career statistics
Competition	First-class	List A
Matches	11	7
Runs scored	245	189
Batting average	14.41	27.00
100s/50s	0/0	0/1
Top score	44	90
Balls bowled	15	–
Wickets	1	–
Bowling average	22.00	–
5 wickets in innings	0	–
10 wickets in match	0	–
Best bowling	1/22	–
Catches/stumpings	11/–	4/–
- Source: CricInfo, CricketArchive, 05 October 2026

Simon Widdup (born 10 November 1977, in Doncaster, Yorkshire, England) is an English first-class cricketer, who made eleven first-class appearances for Yorkshire County Cricket Club in 2000 and 2001, when he was a part of their County Championship winning squad. He scored a total of 245 runs, with a career best of 44 at an average of 14.41.
