= Hollie Armitage =

English cricketer

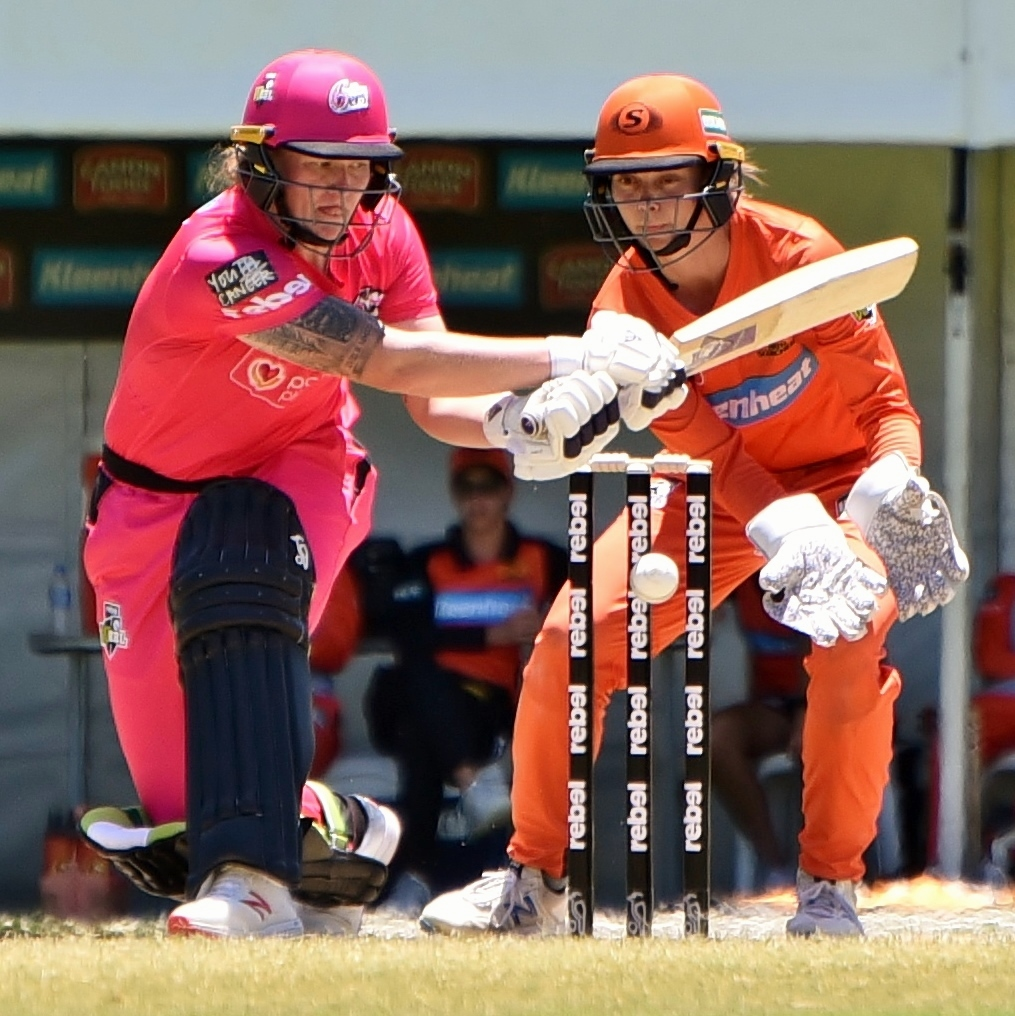
- Armitage batting for Sydney Sixers in 2019

Personal information
- Full name: Hollie Jade Armitage
- Born: 14 June 1997 (age 29); Huddersfield, West Yorkshire, England
- Batting: Right-handed
- Bowling: Right-arm leg break
- Role: All-rounder

International information
- National side: England
- ODI debut (cap 146): 7 September 2024 v Ireland
- Last ODI: 11 September 2024 v Ireland
- T20I debut (cap 62): 24 March 2024 v New Zealand
- Last T20I: 15 September 2024 v Ireland

Domestic team information
- Years: Team
- 2013–present: Yorkshire
- 2016–2019: Yorkshire Diamonds
- 2019/20: Sydney Sixers
- 2019/20: Tasmania
- 2020–present: Northern Diamonds
- 2021–present: Northern Superchargers
- 2023/24: Central Districts
- 2024/25: South Australia

Career statistics
Competition	WODI	WT20I	WLA	WT20
Matches	3	3	96	133
Runs scored	78	5	2,752	2,610
Batting average	26.00	1.66	33.15	22.30
100s/50s	0/0	0/0	5/15	0/13
Top score	44	4	131*	97
Balls bowled	–	–	1,429	680
Wickets	–	–	52	34
Bowling average	–	–	23.55	20.38
5 wickets in innings	–	–	0	0
10 wickets in match	–	–	0	0
Best bowling	–	–	4/17	4/27
Catches/stumpings	1/–	1/–	33/–	48/–
- Source: Cricket Archive, 1 October 2024

Hollie Jade Armitage (born 14 June 1997) is an English cricketer who currently captains Yorkshire and Northern Diamonds, as well as playing for Northern Superchargers. An all-rounder, she plays as a right-handed batter and right-arm leg break bowler. She has previously played for Yorkshire Diamonds, Sydney Sixers and Tasmania.

== Early life ==
Armitage was born on 14 June 1997 in Huddersfield, West Yorkshire.

== Domestic career ==
Armitage made her county debut in 2013, for Yorkshire against Surrey, scoring 25 runs and taking 3/2 from 1.4 overs in a 12-run victory. In 2016, she was Yorkshire's leading run-scorer in the County Championship, with 153 runs including two half-centuries, as well as taking 7 wickets at an average of 12.85. She was again Yorkshire's leading run-scorer in the 2017 Women's County Championship, with 192 runs, including 3 half-centuries. Armitage began captaining Yorkshire in 2016, and captained her first full season in 2019. In 2019, she scored 165 runs in the County Championship, the most for her side. In 2021, she was the side's leading run-scorer and leading wicket-taker in the Twenty20 Cup, with 184 runs and 5 wickets. She was again her side's leading run-scorer in the 2022 Women's Twenty20 Cup, with 214 runs including two half-centuries.

Armitage also played for Yorkshire Diamonds in the Women's Cricket Super League in 2016, 2017 and 2019. Overall, she played 20 matches, scoring 303 runs including one half-century, against Western Storm in 2019.

In November 2019, Armitage was signed by Sydney Sixers for the remainder of the 2019–20 Women's Big Bash League season as a replacement for the injured Ellyse Perry. She played five matches for the side, scoring 54 runs at an average of 10.80. Later that season, she played six matches for Tasmania in the WNCL, scoring 103 runs at an average of 17.16.

In 2020 she joined Northern Diamonds, and was named as captain of the side. She led the side to the final of the Rachael Heyhoe Flint Trophy in their first season, and was the side's second-highest run-scorer, with 176 runs. In 2021, she led the side to the finals of both the Rachael Heyhoe Flint Trophy and the Charlotte Edwards Cup, and was the side's leading run-scorer in the latter tournament. She also played for Northern Superchargers in The Hundred, appearing in three matches. In 2022, she led Northern Diamonds to their first title, winning the Rachael Heyhoe Flint Trophy. She also scored her maiden century, and the highest score across the entire 2022 Rachael Heyhoe Flint Trophy, against Western Storm, scoring 131*. She was also her side's leading run-scorer in the Charlotte Edwards Cup, with 151 runs. She was also ever-present for Northern Superchargers in The Hundred, scoring 119 runs and taking one wicket.

In 2023, she was Northern Diamonds' leading run-scorer in the Charlotte Edwards Cup, with 216 runs at an average of 30.85. She also scored 384 runs in the Rachael Heyhoe Flint Trophy, including making 106* against Southern Vipers. She was ever-present for Northern Superchargers in The Hundred, scoring 167 runs in nine innings.

In December 2023, it was announced that Armitage had signed for Central Districts for the 2023–24 Super Smash.

In July 2024, she signed a three year professional contract as a first women’s professional captain by Durham.

== International career ==
In February 2024, Armitage was selected to the England's T20I squad for the series against New Zealand. She made her international debut in Twenty20 International against New Zealand on 24 March 2024. Armitage made her One Day International debut for England against Ireland at Stormont in Belfast on 7 September 2024, top scoring for her side with 44 runs off 44 balls.
