= Katie Levick =

English cricketer

Personal information
- Full name: Katie Ann Levick
- Born: 18 July 1991 (age 35); Sheffield, England
- Batting: Right-handed
- Bowling: Right-arm leg break
- Role: Bowler

Domestic team information
- Years: Team
- 2008–2024: Yorkshire
- 2016–2019: Yorkshire Diamonds
- 2020–2024: Northern Diamonds
- 2021–2022: Northern Superchargers
- 2023–2024: Birmingham Phoenix
- 2025–present: Durham
- 2025: Welsh Fire
- 2026–present: Trent Rockets

Career statistics
| Competition | WLA | WT20 |
|---|---|---|
| Matches | 118 | 130 |
| Runs scored | 237 | 122 |
| Batting average | 7.18 | 4.35 |
| 100s/50s | 0/0 | 0/0 |
| Top score | 30* | 13 |
| Balls bowled | 5,580 | 2,607 |
| Wickets | 183 | 161 |
| Bowling average | 17.40 | 15.69 |
| 5 wickets in innings | 3 | 3 |
| 10 wickets in match | 0 | 0 |
| Best bowling | 6/25 | 5/15 |
| Catches/stumpings | 19/– | 10/– |
- Source: CricketArchive, 5 October 2023

Katie Ann Levick (born 18 July 1991) is an English cricketer who has played for Yorkshire, Yorkshire Diamonds, Northern Diamonds, Birmingham Phoenix, Durham and Welsh Fire. She is a leg spin bowler, and is the leading wicket taker in Women's County Championship cricket.

== Personal life ==
Levick is from Sheffield. Levick studied at Sheffield Hallam University, graduating in 2012. She later worked as a teacher, and as of 2020, she was a marketing manager for Yorkshire CCC's coaching department.

== Career ==
Levick played club cricket for Upper Haugh Cricket Club in Rotherham, alongside her brother. The club had no girls team, so she played on the boys team. At the age of 16, Levick debuted for Yorkshire Women. She has taken 190 wickets in the Women's County Championship, more than any other player. Levick took 20 wickets in the 2015 season at an average of 9 runs per wicket. She was the second highest wicket taker in the competition, behind Sarah Clarke. In 2018, Levick took 20 wickets for Yorkshire Women in the County Championship and Twenty20 tournaments.

From 2011 to 2012, Levick was a member of the England Academy squad, but after graduating from university, she left the academy to find paid work. Levick played in the Women's Cricket Super League between 2016 and 2019, representing the Yorkshire Diamonds. She took 29 wickets, more than any other non-international cricketer, at an economy rate of 6.60. In 2019, Levick was named The Guardian's Women's Cricketer of the Year.

In 2020, Levick played for the Northern Diamonds in the Rachael Heyhoe Flint Trophy. She took eight wickets in the group stages of the tournament, including taking 3/22 from 10 overs in the Diamonds' match against North West Thunder. In the Rachael Heyhoe Flint Trophy final against Southern Vipers, Levick took 3/49 from 8 overs, including the wicket of Georgia Adams. Levick signed for the Northern Superchargers for The Hundred. The 2020 season of The Hundred was cancelled due to the COVID-19 pandemic, but Levick was retained by the Superchargers for the 2021 season. In October 2020, Levick tested positive for COVID-19, and later suffered the effects of long COVID. At one point, she was unsure if she would be able to play cricket again, though she later returned to action in the 2021 Rachael Heyhoe Flint Trophy. At the end of the 2021 season, it was announced that Levick had signed a professional contract with Northern Diamonds.

In April 2022, she was signed by the Northern Superchargers for the 2022 season of The Hundred. She was the leading wicket-taker in the 2022 Charlotte Edwards Cup, with 15 wickets at an average of 9.06. In 2023, she was Northern Diamonds' leading wicket-taker in both the Rachael Heyhoe Flint Trophy and the Charlotte Edwards Cup, with 24 and 12 wickets respectively, as well as being Birmingham Phoenix's leading wicket-taker in The Hundred, taking 11 wickets. in four seasons of the Charlotte Edwards Cup, Levick was in the top five wicket-takers on three occasions.

Following the re-organisation of women's cricket in England, Levick signed for Durham ahead of the 2025 season. She signed a three-year deal with the club, and chose the club over Yorkshire as Durham were a Tier 1 club in 2025, whereas Yorkshire were Tier 2. Prior to the 2025 The Hundred season, Levick moved from Birmingham Phoenix to Welsh Fire.
