= Lauren Winfield-Hill =

English cricketer (born 1990)

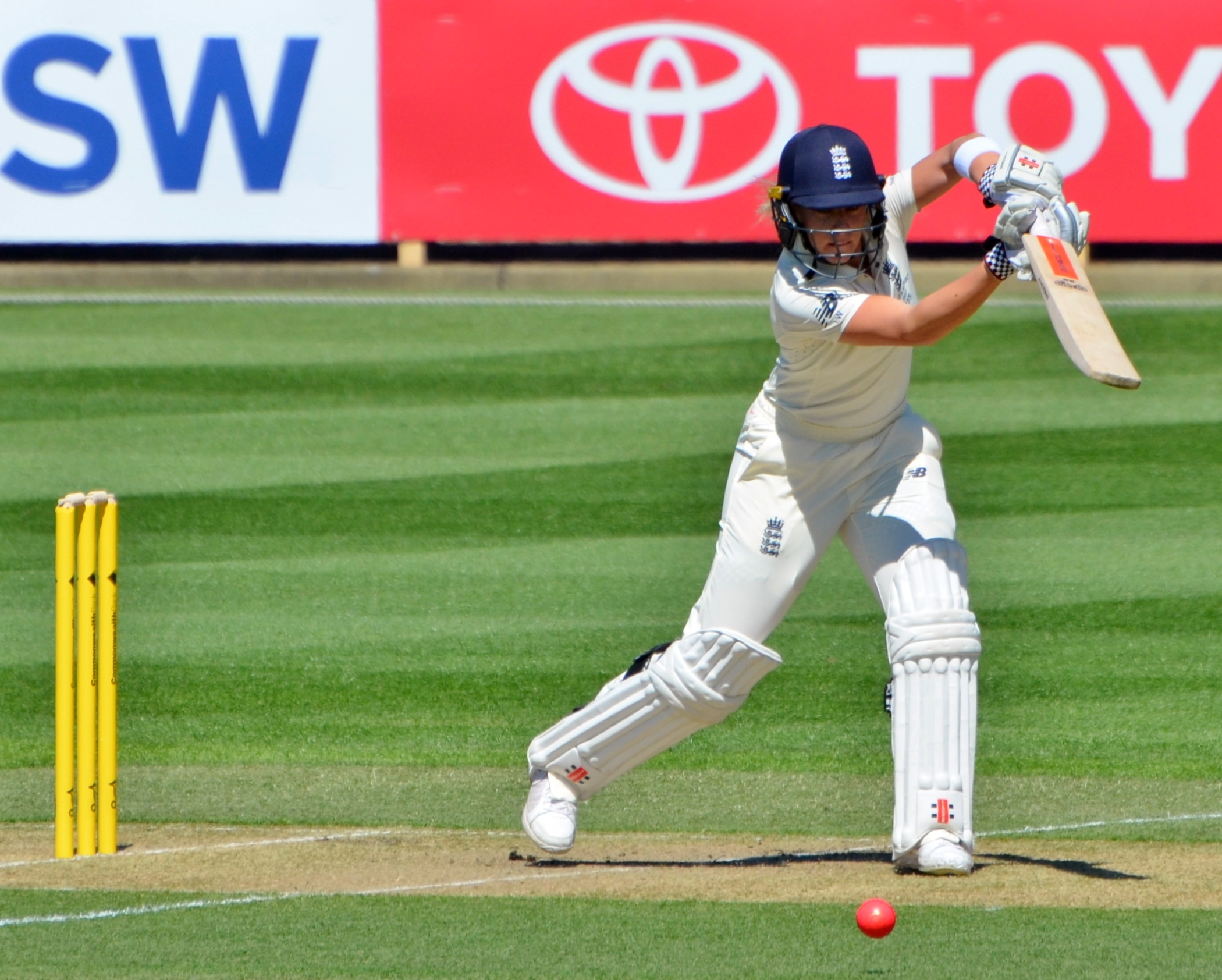
- Winfield during the Women's Ashes Test, 2017

Personal information
- Full name: Lauren Winfield-Hill
- Born: 16 August 1990 (age 36); York, North Yorkshire, England
- Nickname: Loz
- Batting: Right-handed
- Role: Batter, wicket-keeper
- Relatives: Courtney Hill (wife)

International information
- National side: England (2013–present)
- Test debut (cap 155): 13 August 2014 v India
- Last Test: 27 January 2022 v Australia
- ODI debut (cap 123): 1 July 2013 v Pakistan
- Last ODI: 9 March 2022 v West Indies
- ODI shirt no.: 58
- T20I debut (cap 35): 5 July 2013 v Pakistan
- Last T20I: 18 December 2022 v West Indies

Domestic team information
- Years: Team
- 2007–present: Yorkshire
- 2015/16–2016/17: Brisbane Heat
- 2016–2019: Yorkshire Diamonds
- 2017/18: Hobart Hurricanes
- 2019/20: Adelaide Strikers
- 2020–present: Northern Diamonds
- 2021: Northern Superchargers
- 2022–present: Oval Invincibles
- 2022/23: Melbourne Stars
- 2023: Perth Scorchers
- 2023/24–present: Queensland
- 2024/25: Brisbane Heat
- 2025: → Essex (on loan)

Career statistics
Competition	WTest	WODI	WT20I	WLA
Matches	5	55	44	162
Runs scored	166	1,186	596	4,535
Batting average	18.44	23.25	20.55	32.16
100s/50s	0/0	1/3	0/3	5/27
Top score	35	123	74	128
Catches/stumpings	1/–	19/–	17/1	88/24
- Source: CricketArchive, 5 October 2023

Lauren Winfield-Hill (née Winfield; born 16 August 1990) is an English cricketer who currently plays for Yorkshire, Northern Diamonds, Oval Invincibles, Perth Scorchers, Queensland and England. She plays as a right-handed batter and occasional wicket-keeper. She made her international debut in 2013, and was part of the England team that won the 2017 World Cup. She has previously played for Northern Superchargers in The Hundred and Brisbane Heat, Hobart Hurricanes, Adelaide Strikers and Melbourne Stars in the Big Bash.

== Career ==
In the summer of 2014 she appeared 5 times in various games including the one against South Africa. She is the holder of one of the first tranche of 18 ECB central contracts for women players, which were announced in April 2014.

Winfield was a member of the winning women's team at the 2017 Women's Cricket World Cup held in England.

In October 2018, she was named in England's squad for the 2018 ICC Women's World Twenty20 tournament in the West Indies. In February 2019, she was awarded a full central contract by the England and Wales Cricket Board (ECB) for 2019. In June 2019, the ECB named her in England's squad for their opening match against Australia to contest the Women's Ashes. In January 2020, she was named in England's squad for the 2020 ICC Women's T20 World Cup in Australia.

On 18 June 2020, Winfield was named in a squad of 24 players to begin training ahead of international women's fixtures starting in England following the COVID-19 pandemic. In June 2021, Winfield-Hill was named as in England's Test squad for their one-off match against India. In 2021, she was drafted by Northern Superchargers for the inaugural season of The Hundred.

In December 2021, Winfield-Hill was named in England's squad for their tour to Australia to contest the Women's Ashes. In February 2022, she was named in England's team for the 2022 Women's Cricket World Cup in New Zealand.

In April 2022, she was bought by the Oval Invincibles for the 2022 season of The Hundred. She was named as Player of the Year in the 2022 Rachael Heyhoe Flint Trophy, as the tournament's leading run-scorer with 470 runs at an average of 78.30. She was again the leading run-scorer in the 2023 Rachael Heyhoe Flint Trophy, with 663 runs at an average of 51.00.

== Personal life ==
Winfield's nickname is "Loz". In October 2019, Winfield-Hill was diagnosed with Crohn's disease.

In March 2020, she married Australian sportswoman Courtney Hill. The two have lived together in England since 2018.

== See also ==
- List of people diagnosed with Crohn's disease
