= Phoebe Turner =

English cricketer

Personal information
- Full name: Phoebe Elisabeth Turner
- Born: 8 August 2003 (age 23); Rotherham, South Yorkshire, England
- Batting: Right-handed
- Bowling: Right-arm medium
- Role: Batter

Domestic team information
- Years: Team
- 2020–2024: Yorkshire
- 2022–2024: Northern Diamonds

Career statistics
| Competition | WLA | WT20 |
|---|---|---|
| Matches | 30 | 17 |
| Runs scored | 215 | 165 |
| Batting average | 10.23 | 13.75 |
| 100s/50s | 0/0 | 0/0 |
| Top score | 49* | 30* |
| Balls bowled | 786 | 66 |
| Wickets | 28 | 2 |
| Bowling average | 23.50 | 27.50 |
| 5 wickets in innings | 1 | 0 |
| 10 wickets in match | 0 | 0 |
| Best bowling | 6/20 | 1/12 |
| Catches/stumpings | 7/– | 9/– |
- Source: CricketArchive, 17 October 2024

Phoebe Elisabeth Turner (born 8 August 2003) is an English cricketer who most recently played for Yorkshire and Northern Diamonds. She plays primarily as a right-handed batter.

== Domestic career ==
Turner first played for Yorkshire in 2020, in friendlies arranged when the county season was cancelled due to the COVID-19 pandemic. She made her full county debut for Yorkshire in the 2021 Women's Twenty20 Cup, against Cumbria. She played 7 matches for the side in the 2022 Women's Twenty20 Cup, scoring 95 runs with a top score of 26.

Turner was named in the Northern Diamonds Academy squad for the 2021 season. She was promoted to the first team squad ahead of the 2022 season. She made her debut for the side on 14 May 2022, against Lightning in the Charlotte Edwards Cup. She went on to play eight matches overall for Northern Diamonds in the 2022 season. At the end of the 2022 season, it was announced that Turner had signed her first professional contract with Northern Diamonds. In 2023, she played 11 matches for Northern Diamonds, all in the Rachael Heyhoe Flint Trophy, and took five wickets. In 2024, she was the leading wicket-taker across the entire Rachael Heyhoe Flint Trophy, taking 23 wickets.
