= Northern Diamonds =

Former women's cricket team in northern England

Team information
- Colours: Dark blue
- Established: 2020
- Home ground: (Yorkshire) Headingley Cricket Ground (County Durham) Riverside Ground (Yorkshire) North Marine Road Ground (Yorkshire) Clifton Park Ground

History
- RHFT wins: 1
- CEC wins: 0
- Official website: Northern Diamonds
One-day
T20

Northern Diamonds were a women's cricket team that represented the traditional areas of the North East and Yorkshire, one of eight regional hubs in English domestic women's cricket. They primarily played their home matches at Headingley and the Riverside. They were captained by Hollie Armitage and coached by former England cricketer Danielle Hazell.

The team carried over elements of the WCSL team Yorkshire Diamonds, and were partnered with Yorkshire and North East Warriors. The Diamonds reached the final of the first three tournaments that they competed in, but lost each time. They won their first title in 2022, winning the Rachael Heyhoe Flint Trophy.

At the end of the 2024 season, following reforms to the structure of women's domestic cricket, the team was effectively replaced by a professionalised Durham team.

== History ==
In 2020, women's cricket in England was restructured, creating eight new 'regional hub' teams, with the intention of playing both 50-over and 20-over cricket. Northern Diamonds were one of the sides created under this structure, effectively replacing the Women's Cricket Super League team Yorkshire Diamonds and representing the North East and Yorkshire, partnering with Yorkshire, Durham and Northumberland. The side was to be captained by Hollie Armitage and coached by Danielle Hazell. Due to the COVID-19 pandemic, the 2020 season was truncated, and only 50-over cricket was played, in the Rachael Heyhoe Flint Trophy. Northern Diamonds won the North Group in the competition, winning five of their six matches to progress to the final. In the final, they faced Southern Vipers, who scored 231 batting first. However, Charlotte Taylor's 6/34 helped bowl out the Diamonds for 193, meaning they finished as runners-up. At the end of the season, five Diamonds players were given full-time domestic contracts, the first of their kind in England: Hollie Armitage, Beth Langston, Linsey Smith, Phoebe Graham and Jenny Gunn.

The following season, 2021, Northern Diamonds competed in both the Rachael Heyhoe Flint Trophy and the newly formed Twenty20 competition, the Charlotte Edwards Cup. In the Charlotte Edwards Cup, the side topped Group B with four wins from their six matches, just edging out Western Storm on Net Run Rate to qualify for the play-off on Finals Day. In the play-off, Diamonds beat Southern Vipers by 18 runs to qualify for the final, where they faced South East Stars. Batting first, Northern Diamonds made 138/4 with captain Armitage making 59*. However, Stars chased the target down with 2 overs to spare to win by 5 wickets. In the Rachael Heyhoe Flint Trophy, Northern Diamonds again qualified for the knockout stages, finishing second in the group with five wins from their seven matches. They faced Central Sparks in the play-off, and beat them by 6 wickets thanks to Ami Campbell's 76 to progress to the final, where they again faced Southern Vipers. Batting first in the final, the Diamonds made 183, with Campbell again top-scoring with 60. However, despite reducing Vipers to 109/7, the side went on to lose the final by 3 wickets with 2 balls to spare.

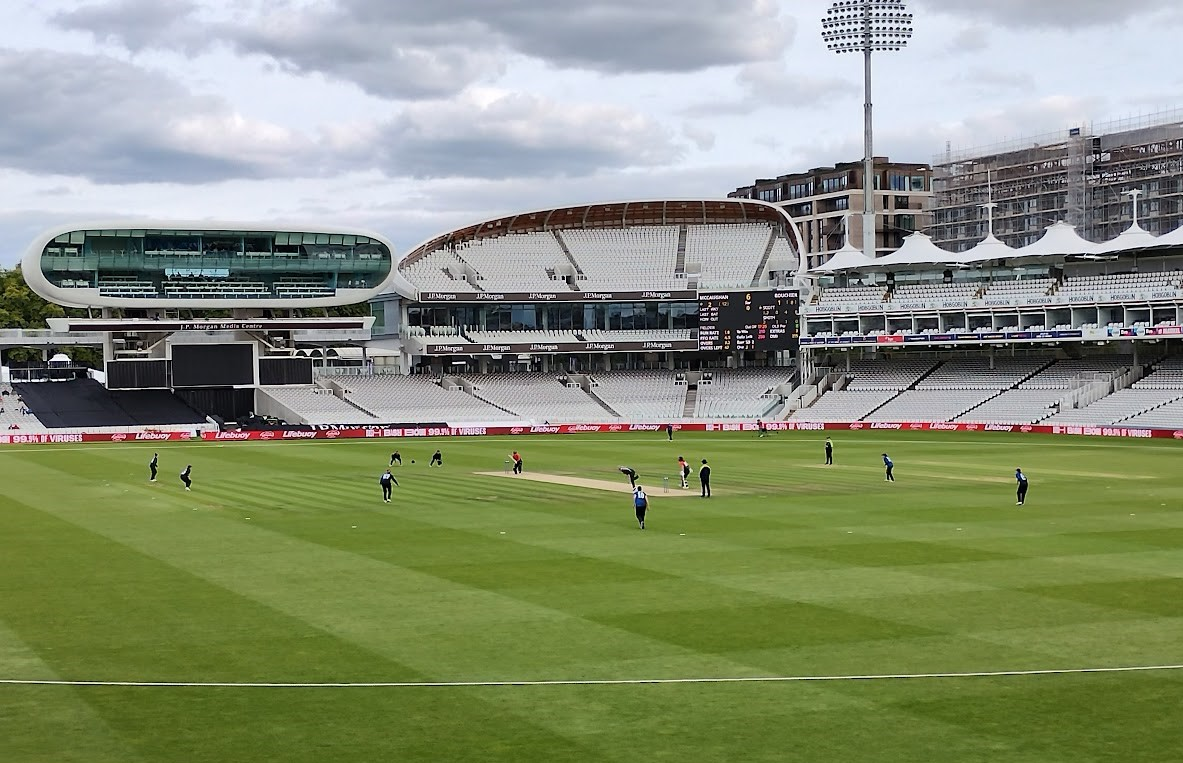
Northern Diamonds in the field in the 2022 Rachael Heyhoe Flint Trophy final at Lord's.

In 2022, the side finished second in their Charlotte Edwards Cup group, with three wins from their six games, missing out on qualifying for Finals Day as the worst second-placed team. The side topped the group in the Rachael Heyhoe Flint Trophy, however, going unbeaten. They faced Southern Vipers in the final, for the third consecutive time in the Rachael Heyhoe Flint Trophy, but this time emerged victorious by two runs. Diamonds batter Lauren Winfield-Hill was the leading run-scorer in the competition, and bowler Linsey Smith was the joint leading wicket-taker.

In 2023, they finished fourth out of eight in the Charlotte Edwards Cup and sixth out of eight in the Rachael Heyhoe Flint Trophy. Diamonds batter Lauren Winfield-Hill was again the leading run-scorer in the Rachael Heyhoe Flint Trophy, with 663 runs including one century. In 2024, the side finished sixth in the Charlotte Edwards Cup and finished top of the group in the Rachael Heyhoe Flint Trophy, before losing to Sunrisers in the semi-finals. Diamonds bowler Phoebe Turner was the leading wicket-taker in the Rachael Heyhoe Flint Trophy, with 23 wickets.

2024 was the side's final season, with reforms to the structure of domestic cricket in England meaning that the side was effectively replaced by a professionalised Durham team.

== Home grounds ==
Venue	Games hosted by season					
Venue	20	21	22	23	24	Total
Riverside Ground	1	3	3	3	4	14
Headingley Cricket Ground	2	3	3	5	6	19
South Northumberland Cricket Club	–	1	–	1	–	2
North Marine Road Ground	–	1	–	1	2	4
Clifton Park Ground	–	–	–	1	1	2

== Players ==
=== Overseas players ===
- Leigh Kasperek – New Zealand (2022)
- Chloe Tryon – South Africa (2023)
- Erin Burns – Australia (2024)

== Seasons ==
=== Rachael Heyhoe Flint Trophy ===
Season	Final standing	League standings									Notes
Season	Final standing	P	W	L	T	NR	BP	Pts	NRR	Pos	Notes
2020	Runners-up	6	5	1	0	0	3	23	+1.000	1st	Lost to Southern Vipers in the final
2021	Runners-up	7	5	2	0	0	3	23	+1.182	2nd	Lost to Southern Vipers in the final
2022	Champions	7	6	0	0	1	2	28	+0.851	1st	Won against Southern Vipers in the final
2023	Group stage	14	6	7	0	1	4	30	–0.034	6th	DNQ
2024	Semi-finals	14	9	4	0	1	3	41	+0.097	1st	Lost to Sunrisers in the semi-finals

=== Charlotte Edwards Cup ===
Season	Final standing	League standings									Notes
Season	Final standing	P	W	L	T	NR	BP	Pts	NRR	Pos	Notes
2021	Runners-up	6	4	2	0	0	1	17	+0.655	1st	Lost to South East Stars in the final
2022	Group stages	6	3	3	0	0	2	14	–0.102	2nd	DNQ
2023	Group stages	7	4	3	0	0	1	17	–0.129	4th	DNQ
2024	Group stages	10	3	7	0	0	1	13	–0.067	6th	DNQ

== Statistics ==
=== Rachael Heyhoe Flint Trophy ===
Rachael Heyhoe Flint Trophy - summary of results
Year	Played	Wins	Losses	Tied	NR	Win %
2020	7	5	2	0	0	71.43
2021	9	6	3	0	0	66.67
2022	8	7	0	0	1	87.50
2023	14	6	7	0	1	42.86
2024	15	9	5	0	1	60.00
Total	53	33	17	0	3	62.26

- Abandoned matches are counted as NR (no result)
- Win or loss by super over or boundary count are counted as tied.

Rachael Heyhoe Flint Trophy - teamwise result summary
Opposition	Mat	Won	Lost	Tied	NR	Win %
Central Sparks	9	5	4	0	0	55.55
North West Thunder	8	7	1	0	0	87.50
South East Stars	6	4	1	0	1	66.67
Southern Vipers	9	3	5	0	1	33.33
Sunrisers	7	4	3	0	0	57.14
The Blaze	8	4	3	0	1	50.00
Western Storm	6	6	0	0	0	100.00

=== Charlotte Edwards Cup ===
Charlotte Edwards Cup - summary of results
Year	Played	Wins	Losses	Tied	NR	Win %
2021	8	5	3	0	0	62.50
2022	6	3	3	0	0	50.00
2023	7	4	3	0	0	57.14
2024	10	3	7	0	0	30.00
Total	31	15	16	0	0	48.39

- Abandoned matches are counted as NR (no result)
- Win or loss by super over or boundary count are counted as tied.

Charlotte Edwards Cup - teamwise result summary
Opposition	Mat	Won	Lost	Tied	NR	Win %
Central Sparks	3	2	1	0	0	66.67
North West Thunder	7	3	4	0	0	42.86
South East Stars	3	1	2	0	0	33.33
Southern Vipers	5	1	4	0	0	20.00
Sunrisers	4	3	1	0	0	75.00
The Blaze	5	2	3	0	0	40.00
Western Storm	4	3	1	0	0	75.00

== Records ==
=== Rachael Heyhoe Flint Trophy ===
- Highest team total: 334/6, v Western Storm on 11 September 2022.
- Lowest (completed) team total: 62 v The Blaze on 6 May 2023.
- Highest individual score: 131*, Hollie Armitage v Western Storm on 11 September 2022.
- Best individual bowling analysis: 6/20, Phoebe Turner v North West Thunder on 1 September 2024.
- Most runs: 1,722 runs in 42 matches, Lauren Winfield-Hill.
- Most wickets: 79 wickets in 51 matches, Katie Levick.

=== Charlotte Edwards Cup ===
- Highest team total: 218/3, v Western Storm on 19 May 2023.
- Lowest (completed) team total: 92 v North West Thunder on 18 May 2022.
- Highest individual score: 98, Lauren Winfield-Hill v Western Storm on 19 May 2023.
- Best individual bowling analysis: 5/15, Katie Levick v Southern Vipers on 21 May 2022.
- Most runs: 831 runs in 31 matches, Hollie Armitage.
- Most wickets: 51 wickets in 31 matches, Katie Levick.

== Honours ==
- Rachael Heyhoe Flint Trophy:
  - Champions (1) – 2022

== See also ==
- Durham Women cricket team
- North East Warriors
- Northumberland Women cricket team
- Yorkshire Women cricket team
- Yorkshire Diamonds
