= 2020 Rachael Heyhoe Flint Trophy =

English cricket season

- Dates: 29 August 2020 – 27 September 2020
- Administrator: England and Wales Cricket Board
- Cricket format: 50-over cricket
- Tournament format(s): Group stage and final
- Champions: Southern Vipers (1st title)
- Participants: 8
- Matches: 25
- Most runs: Georgia Adams (500)
- Most wickets: Charlotte Taylor (15)
- Official website: ecb.co.uk

The 2020 Rachael Heyhoe Flint Trophy was the first edition of the Rachael Heyhoe Flint Trophy, an English women's cricket domestic competition, which took place between 29 August and 27 September 2020. It featured eight teams in two groups, and had a final. The tournament was named after former England captain Rachael Heyhoe Flint, Baroness Heyhoe-Flint, who died in 2017.

The competition was won by Southern Vipers, who beat Northern Diamonds in the final.

== Background and format ==
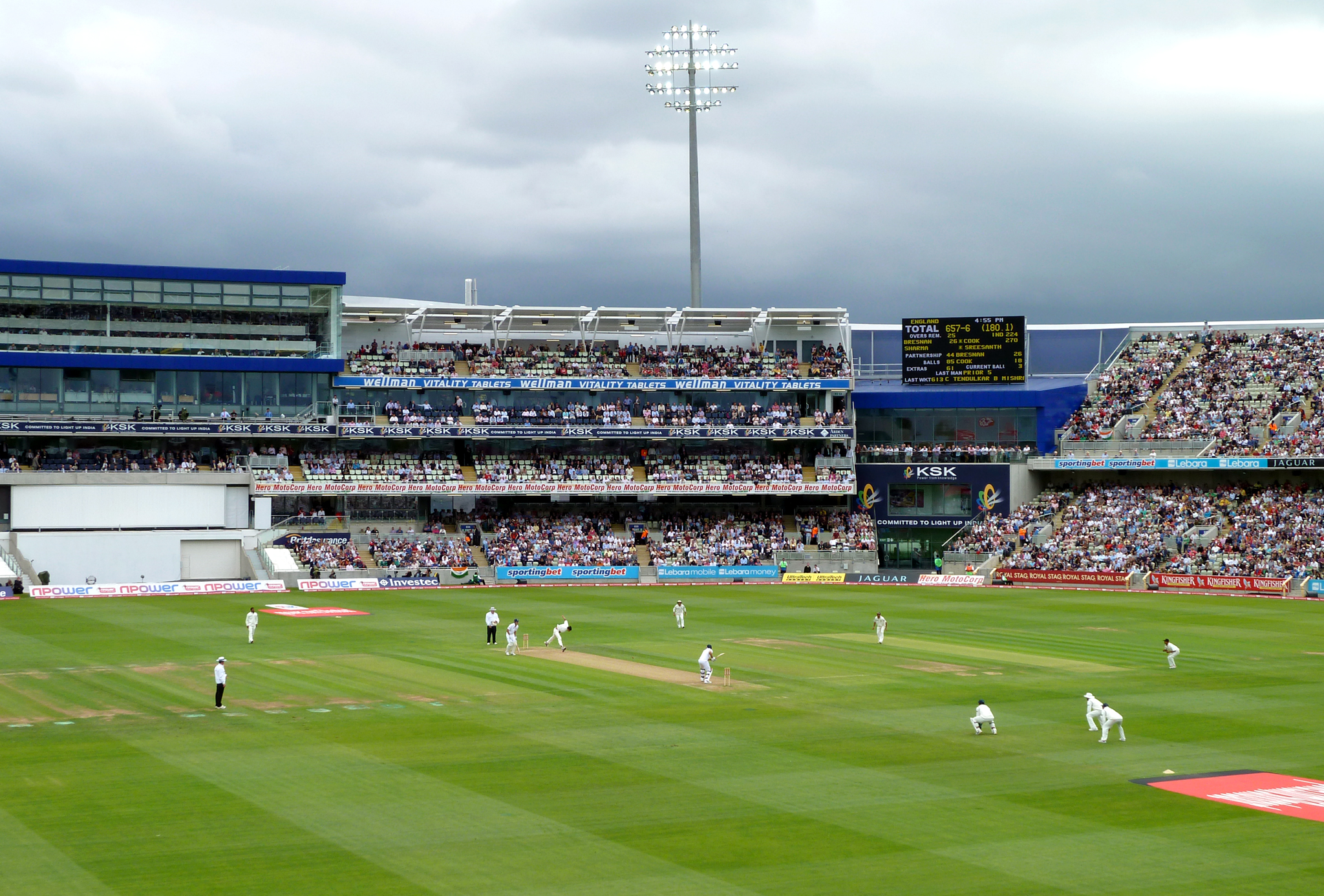
Edgbaston, pictured here in 2011, was the venue for the final.

The Rachael Heyhoe Flint Trophy was a 50-over cricket tournament created in 2020 so that English women's cricket could be played in spite of the COVID-19 pandemic. All matches took place behind closed doors due to the COVID-19 pandemic. The England and Wales Cricket Board made some matches available to watch online, and the final was shown live on Sky Sports. The competition was named after former England captain Rachael Heyhoe Flint, Baroness Heyhoe-Flint, who died in 2017.

The competition featured eight teams, who represented regional hubs, which were formed during an overhaul of the English women's domestic cricket structure. The teams were separated into a North and South Group, and each team played six group stage matches, in a double round-robin format. The two group winners played each other in the competition's final. The competition began on 29 August, and ended with the final on 27 September. Originally the final was scheduled for 26 September at the ground of the team with the most points, but the fixture was moved back to 27 September to avoid a clash with an England women's T20 match against the West Indies. Edgbaston was chosen as the venue for the final.

== Teams ==
The teams were as follows:

North Group

- Central Sparks (representing Warwickshire, Worcestershire, Herefordshire, Shropshire and Staffordshire)
- Lightning (representing Loughborough University, Derbyshire, Leicestershire, Nottinghamshire and Lincolnshire)
- Northern Diamonds (representing Yorkshire, Durham and Northumberland)
- North West Thunder (representing Lancashire, Cheshire and Cumbria)

South Group

- South East Stars (representing Surrey and Kent)
- Southern Vipers (representing Hampshire, Sussex, Berkshire, Buckinghamshire, Dorset, Isle of Wight and Oxfordshire)
- Sunrisers (representing Middlesex, Essex, Northamptonshire, Bedfordshire, Cambridgeshire, Hertfordshire, Huntingdonshire, Norfolk and Suffolk)
- Western Storm (representing Glamorgan, Gloucestershire, Somerset, Cornwall, Devon, Wiltshire and Cricket Wales)

== Squads ==
Each team had a squad of 15 players, and players on England central contracts were available for the competition. All players were paid for participating in the competitions, excluding those already on central contracts. After the squad announcements, England centrally contracted players were added to their teams. England players on a regional retainer contract were assigned to their regional team, and centrally contracted players were assigned appropriately. England players in the squad for the West Indies series were only available for the first two rounds of fixtures.

Southern Vipers were the first team to announce their squad. Their regionally contracted players were Lauren Bell, Georgia Adams, Tara Norris, and Paige Scholfield. Northern Diamonds' squad included former England international cricketer Jenny Gunn and Dutch international cricketer Sterre Kalis. Their centrally contracted players were Hollie Armitage and Beth Langston. South East Stars were captained by Tash Farrant, and their 14 women squad included England players Sophia Dunkley, Alice Davidson-Richards, and Bryony Smith. Lightning's squad included Scottish sisters Kathryn and Sarah Bryce. North West Thunder's squad included England cricketer Alex Hartley, as well as Georgie Boyce and Ellie Threlkeld who received regional retainers. Western Storm were captained by Sophie Luff, and their squad included regionally contracted players Fi Morris and Danielle Gibson. Central Sparks' squad included regionally contracted players Evelyn Jones, Marie Kelly and Issy Wong. Sunrisers were captained by Amara Carr, and their squad included regionally contracted players Naomi Dattani, Cordelia Griffith who received regional retainers, and also included England international cricketer Fran Wilson and Mady Villiers.

== Standings ==
Teams received 4 points for a win. A bonus point was given where the winning team's run rate is 1.25 or greater times that of the opposition. In case of a tie in the standings, the following tiebreakers were applied in order: highest net run rate, team that scored the most points in matches involving the tied parties, better bowling strike rate, drawing of lots.

=== North Group ===
Pos	Team	Pld	W	L	T	NR	BP	Pts	NRR
1	Northern Diamonds	6	5	1	0	0	3	23	1.000
2	Central Sparks	6	3	3	0	0	1	13	−0.285
3	North West Thunder	6	2	4	0	0	1	9	−0.515
4	Lightning	6	2	4	0	0	0	8	−0.113

Source: BBC Sport, CricInfo, ECB

=== South Group ===
Pos	Team	Pld	W	L	T	NR	BP	Pts	NRR
1	Southern Vipers	6	6	0	0	0	3	27	1.017
2	Western Storm	6	4	2	0	0	2	18	0.510
3	South East Stars	6	2	4	0	0	2	10	−0.197
4	Sunrisers	6	0	6	0	0	0	0	−1.365

Source: BBC Sport, CricInfo, ECB

== Group stage ==
The fixture list was compiled so that every team played twice on the August Bank Holiday weekend.

=== North Group ===
29 August 2020
10:30 BST
Scorecard

Central Sparks; 144 (38.1 overs)	v	Northern Diamonds; 145/1 (24.1 overs)
Gwenan Davies 33 (44); Katherine Brunt 5/20 (9 overs)		Lauren Winfield-Hill 72 (71); Clare Boycott 1/5 (1 over)

Northern Diamonds won by 9 wickets
Edgbaston, Birmingham
Umpires: Jasmine Naeem and Sue Redfern

- Central Sparks won the toss and elected to bat.
- Points: Northern Diamonds 5, Central Sparks 0

29 August 2020
10:30 BST
Scorecard

North West Thunder; 206/9 (50 overs)	v	Lightning; 146 (35.5 overs)
Sophie Ecclestone 60* (61); Sophie Munro 3/32 (9 overs)		Sarah Bryce 52 (69); Sophie Ecclestone 2/29 (7.5 overs)

North West Thunder won by 4 runs (DLS)
Trent Bridge, Nottingham
Umpires: Joanne Ibbotson and Ian Ramage

- North West Thunder won the toss and elected to bat.
- Lightning were set a revised target of 151 runs from 36 overs due to rain.
- Points: North West Thunder 4, Lightning 0

31 August 2020
10:30 BST
Scorecard

North West Thunder; 135 (46.1 overs)	v	Central Sparks; 136/6 (44 overs)
Kate Cross 45 (73); Issy Wong 3/26 (10 overs)		Marie Kelly 59* (99); Sophie Ecclestone 2/13 (10 overs)

Central Sparks won by 4 wickets
Edgbaston, Birmingham
Umpires: Malinda Underdown and Sue Redfern

- North West Thunder won the toss and elected to bat.
- Points: Central Sparks 4, North West Thunder 0

31 August 2020
10:30 BST
Scorecard

Northern Diamonds; 226/9 (50 overs)	v	Lightning; 217/7 (50 overs)
Nat Sciver 104 (116); Kathryn Bryce 5/29 (10 overs)		Kathryn Bryce 71* (81); Nat Sciver 2/30 (10 overs)

Northern Diamonds won by 9 runs
Riverside Ground, Chester-le-Street
Umpires: Neil Pratt and Lina Nenova

- Northern Diamonds won the toss and elected to bat.
- Points: Northern Diamonds 4, Lightning 0

5 September 2020
10:30 BST
Scorecard

North West Thunder; 166/8 (50 overs)	v	Central Sparks; 167/2 (38.1 overs)
Natalie Brown 27 (47); Clare Boycott 4/40 (10 overs)		Evelyn Jones 90 (113); Olivia Thomas 1/29 (4 overs)

Central Sparks won by 8 wickets
New Road, Worcester
Umpires: Malinda Underdown and Jeremy Lloyds

- North West Thunder won the toss and elected to bat.
- Points: Central Sparks 5, North West Thunder 0

5 September 2020
10:30 BST
Scorecard

Lightning; 226 (49.1 overs)	v	Northern Diamonds; 229/8 (48.5 overs)
Sarah Bryce 51 (69); Alex MacDonald 2/31 (10 overs)		Jenny Gunn 50* (72); Lucy Higham 3/38 (10 overs)

Northern Diamonds won by 2 wickets
Grace Road, Leicester
Umpires: Joanne Ibbotson and Sue Redfern

- Northern Diamonds won the toss and elected to field.
- Points: Northern Diamonds 4, Lightning 0

10 September 2020
10:30 BST
Scorecard

Northern Diamonds; 248/8 (50 overs)	v	North West Thunder; 175/8 (50 overs)
Alex MacDonald 92 (110); Laura Jackson 2/23 (9 overs)		Alice Dyson 25* (51); Katie Levick 3/22 (10 overs)

Northern Diamonds won by 73 runs
Aigburth Cricket Ground, Liverpool
Umpires: Jasmine Naeem and Steve O'Shaughnessy

- North West Thunder won the toss and elected to field.
- Points: Northern Diamonds 5, North West Thunder 0

11 September 2020
10:30 BST
Scorecard

Lightning; 233/8 (50 overs)	v	Central Sparks; 227/9 (50 overs)
Sarah Bryce 75 (98); Anisha Patel 3/49 (10 overs)		Marie Kelly 53 (82); Alicia Presland 3/26 (10 overs)

Lightning won by 6 runs
New Road, Worcester
Umpires: Hassan Adnan and Yvonne Dolphin-Cooper

- Central Sparks won the toss and elected to field.
- Points: Lightning 4, Central Sparks 0

13 September 2020
10:30 BST
Scorecard

North West Thunder; 188/9 (50 overs)	v	Lightning; 116 (39.1 overs)
Natalie Brown 52 (82); Kathryn Bryce 4/38 (10 overs)		Abigail Freeborn 28 (67); Alex Hartley 4/8 (10 overs)

North West Thunder won by 72 runs
Aigburth Cricket Ground, Liverpool
Umpires: Jasmine Naeem and Tom Lungley

- North West Thunder won the toss and elected to bat.
- Points: North West Thunder 5, Lightning 0

13 September 2020
10:30 BST
Scorecard

Northern Diamonds; 217 (50 overs)	v	Central Sparks; 218/4 (46.4 overs)
Sterre Kalis 87 (115); Elizabeth Russell 4/28 (9 overs)		Evelyn Jones 77 (114); Beth Langston 2/27 (8 overs)

Central Sparks won by 6 wickets
Headingley, Leeds
Umpires: Lina Nenova and Peter Hartley

- Northern Diamonds won the toss and elected to bat.
- Points: Central Sparks 4, Northern Diamonds 0

19 September 2020
10:30 BST
Scorecard

North West Thunder; 143 (42.5 overs)	v	Northern Diamonds; 144/4 (29.4 overs)
Natalie Brown 32 (41); Beth Langston 3/18 (8.5 overs)		Sterre Kalis 55* (67); Hannah Jones 1/28 (8 overs)

Northern Diamonds won by 6 wickets
Headingley, Leeds
Umpires: Joanne Ibbotson and Ian Ramage

- North West Thunder won the toss and elected to bat.
- Points: Northern Diamonds 5, North West Thunder 0

19 September 2020
10:30 BST
Scorecard

Lightning; 303/5 (50 overs)	v	Central Sparks; 248 (49.4 overs)
Sarah Bryce 136* (133); Anisha Patel 2/46 (10 overs)		Evelyn Jones 115* (138); Kathryn Bryce 3/54 (9.4 overs)

Lightning won by 55 runs
Grace Road, Leicester
Umpires: Paul Pollard and Malinda Underdown

- Central Sparks won the toss and elected to field.
- Points: Lightning 4, Central Sparks 0

=== South Group ===
29 August 2020
10:30 BST
Scorecard

Sunrisers; 202 (46.1 overs)	v	Southern Vipers; 208/3 (36.2 overs)
Mady Villiers 64 (83); Paige Scholfield 3/33 (9.1 overs)		Danni Wyatt 66 (73); Alice Macleod 1/14 (3 overs)

Southern Vipers won by 7 wickets
County Ground, Chelmsford
Umpires: Chris Watts and Anna Harris

- Southern Vipers won the toss and elected to field.
- Points: Southern Vipers 5, Sunrisers 0

29 August 2020
10:30 BST
Scorecard

South East Stars; 166 (48.1 overs)	v	Western Storm; 167/4 (39.5 overs)
Susie Rowe 38 (44); Georgia Hennessy 4/31 (8.1 overs)		Heather Knight 91* (99); Bryony Smith 1/11 (4 overs)

Western Storm won by 6 wickets
County Ground, Beckenham
Umpires: Sarah Bartlett and Nigel Llong

- Western Storm won the toss and elected to field.
- Points: Western Storm 5, South East Stars 0

31 August 2020
10:30 BST
Scorecard

Southern Vipers; 261/7 (50 overs)	v	Western Storm; 239 (47.5 overs)
Charlie Dean 60* (70); Heather Knight 2/36 (10 overs)		Heather Knight 67 (80); Tara Norris 4/45 (8 overs)

Southern Vipers won by 22 runs
County Ground, Bristol
Umpires: Jeremy Lloyds and Yvonne Dolphin-Cooper

- Western Storm won the toss and elected to field.
- Points: Southern Vipers 4, Western Storm 0

31 August 2020
10:30 BST
Scorecard

South East Stars; 289/8 (50 overs)	v	Sunrisers; 212 (45.5 overs)
Sophia Dunkley 97 (116); Sonali Patel 4/52 (10 overs)		Amara Carr 99 (113); Bryony Smith 3/25 (5.5 overs)

South East Stars won by 77 runs
County Ground, Beckenham
Umpires: Sophie McLelland and Nigel Llong

- South East Stars won the toss and elected to bat.
- Points: South East Stars 5, Sunrisers 0

5 September 2020
10:30 BST
Scorecard

Western Storm; 265/6 (50 overs)	v	Sunrisers; 179 (45 overs)
Sophie Luff 85 (115); Alice Macleod 1/34 (10 overs)		Jo Gardner 54 (76); Fi Morris 5/26 (10 overs)

Western Storm won by 86 runs
County Ground, Chelmsford
Umpires: Nigel Llong and Nigel Cowley

- Sunrisers won the toss and elected to field.
- Points: Western Storm 5, Sunrisers 0

5 September 2020
10:30 BST
Scorecard

Southern Vipers; 209/8 (50 overs)	v	South East Stars; 98 (36.5 overs)
Ella McCaughan 50 (81); Tash Farrant 2/28 (10 overs)		Aylish Cranstone 28 (50); Tara Norris 3/27 (8.5 overs)

Southern Vipers won by 111 runs
County Ground, Hove
Umpires: Mark Newell and Sarah Bartlett

- Southern Vipers won the toss and elected to bat.
- Points: Southern Vipers 5, South East Stars 0

11 September 2020
10:30 BST
Scorecard

South East Stars; 212/9 (50 overs)	v	Western Storm; 215/3 (46.1 overs)
Kirstie White 50 (77); Georgia Hennessy 3/40 (10 overs)		Sophie Luff 104* (133); Tash Farrant 1/28 (7 overs)

Western Storm won by 7 wickets
County Ground, Bristol
Umpires: Fiona Richards and Mark Newell

- South East Stars won the toss and elected to bat.
- Points: Western Storm 4, South East Stars 0

11 September 2020
10:30 BST
Scorecard

Southern Vipers; 232 (49.5 overs)	v	Sunrisers; 183 (43.5 overs)
Georgia Adams 89 (108); Katie Midwood 2/33 (10 overs)		Alice Macleod 35 (45); Tara Norris 3/37 (7 overs)

Southern Vipers won by 49 runs
Rose Bowl, Southampton
Umpires: Billy Taylor and Sophie McLelland

- Southern Vipers won the toss and elected to bat.
- Points: Southern Vipers 5, Sunrisers 0

13 September 2020
10:30 BST
Scorecard

Southern Vipers; 288/1 (50 overs)	v	Western Storm; 256 (50 overs)
Georgia Adams 154* (155); Fi Morris 1/49 (10 overs)		Sophie Luff 79 (88); Charlotte Taylor 4/41 (10 overs)

Southern Vipers won by 32 runs
Rose Bowl, Southampton
Umpires: Mark Newell and Sarah Bartlett

- Southern Vipers won the toss and elected to bat.
- Points: Southern Vipers 4, Western Storm 0

13 September 2020
10:30 BST
Scorecard

Sunrisers; 198 (48.4 overs)	v	South East Stars; 199/4 (37.1 overs)
Naomi Dattani 33 (41); Tash Farrant 3/24 (9.4 overs)		Alice Capsey 73* (75); Jo Gardner 2/13 (4 overs)

South East Stars won by 6 wickets
County Ground, Chelmsford
Umpires: Fiona Richards and Chris Watts

- Sunrisers won the toss and elected to bat.
- Points: South East Stars 5, Sunrisers 0

19 September 2020
10:30 BST
Scorecard

South East Stars; 227 (48.3 overs)	v	Southern Vipers; 230/6 (47.2 overs)
Chloe Brewer 79 (107); Lauren Bell 4/36 (10 overs)		Emily Windsor 47* (43); Danielle Gregory 3/44 (10 overs)

Southern Vipers won by 4 wickets
The Oval, London
Umpires: Ben Debenham and Anna Harris

- South East Stars won the toss and elected to bat.
- Points: Southern Vipers 4, South East Stars 0

19 September 2020
10:30 BST
Scorecard

Western Storm; 288/6 (50 overs)	v	Sunrisers; 241 (49 overs)
Georgia Hennessy 105 (110); Katie Wolfe 2/34 (10 overs)		Grace Scrivens 72 (73); Georgia Hennessy 2/29 (6 overs)

Western Storm won by 47 runs
County Ground, Bristol
Umpires: Mark Newell and Yvonne Dolphin-Cooper

- Sunrisers won the toss and elected to field.
- Points: Western Storm 4, Sunrisers 0

== Final ==
27 September 2020
10:30 BST
Scorecard

Southern Vipers; 231 (49.5 overs)	v	Northern Diamonds; 193 (42.2 overs)
Georgia Adams 80 (102); Katie Levick 3/49 (8 overs)		Sterre Kalis 55 (75); Charlotte Taylor 6/34 (10 overs)

Southern Vipers won by 38 runs
Edgbaston, Birmingham
Umpires: Neil Pratt and Rob White
Player of the match: Charlotte Taylor (Southern Vipers)

- Northern Diamonds won the toss and elected to field.
- Southern Vipers won the 2020 Rachael Heyhoe Flint Trophy.

== Statistics ==
- Highest score by a team: Lightning – 303/5 (50 overs) v Central Sparks (19 September).
- Top score by an individual: Georgia Adams – 154* (155) v Western Storm (13 September).
- Best bowling figures by an individual: Charlotte Taylor – 6/34 (10 overs) v Northern Diamonds (27 September).

=== Most runs ===
Player	Team	Matches	Innings	Runs	Average	HS	100s	50s
Georgia Adams	Southern Vipers	7	7	500	83.33	154*	1	3
Sarah Bryce	Lightning	6	6	395	79.00	136*	1	4
Sophie Luff	Western Storm	6	6	339	67.80	104*	1	3
Evelyn Jones	Central Sparks	6	6	334	66.80	115*	1	2
Marie Kelly	Central Sparks	6	6	223	55.75	59*	0	2

Source: ESPNCricinfo

=== Most wickets ===
Player	Team	Overs	Wickets	Average	BBI	5w
Charlotte Taylor	Southern Vipers	44.0	15	10.13	6/34	1
Kathryn Bryce	Lightning	55.4	14	15.42	5/29	1
Tara Norris	Southern Vipers	44.5	12	17.91	4/45	0
Beth Langston	Northern Diamonds	56.1	12	19.41	3/18	0
Alex Hartley	North West Thunder	54.0	11	15.45	4/8	0

Source: ESPNCricinfo
