= Women's T20 County Cup =

English cricket tournament

Vitality Women's T20 County Cup
- Countries: England; Wales
- Administrator: England and Wales Cricket Board
- Format: Twenty20
- First edition: 2025
- Latest edition: 2025
- Next edition: 2027
- Tournament format: Regional groups
- Number of teams: 37
- Current champion: The Blaze (1st title)
- Most successful: The Blaze; Lancashire (1 title each)
- 2026

The Women's T20 County Cup, is a women's Twenty20 cricket competition organized by the England and Wales Cricket Board. The inaugural tournament was held in May 2025 and featured 37 teams, drawn mainly from the historic counties of England.

== Teams ==
The tournament consists of 37 teams that compete in the tournament that are organized into 3 tier groups. The teams are divided as follows:

Tier 1	Tier 2	Tier 3
Durham; Essex; Hampshire; Lancashire; Somerset; Surrey; The Blaze; Warwickshire; Yorkshire	Derbyshire; Glamorgan; Gloucestershire; Kent; Leicestershire; Middlesex; Northamptonshire; Sussex; Worcestershire	Bedfordshire & Huntingdonshire; Berkshire; Buckinghamshire; Cambridgeshire; Cheshire; Cornwall; Cumbria; Devon; Dorset; Herefordshire; Hertfordshire; Lincolnshire; Norfolk; Northumberland; Oxfordshire; Shropshire; Staffordshire; Suffolk; Wiltshire

== Winners ==
Season	Winner	Winning Margin	Runner-up	Venue	City	Source
2025	Lancashire	Won by 32 runs	Surrey	County Ground	Taunton	
2026	The Blaze	Won by 7 wickets	Surrey	Old Trafford	Manchester	

== See also ==
- Women's T20 Blast
- Women's One-Day Cup
- Charlotte Edwards Cup
- Rachael Heyhoe Flint Trophy
