= 2026 Women's T20 County Cup =

English cricket tournament

2026 Vitality Women's T20 County Cup
- Dates: 26 April – 29 August 2026
- Administrator: England and Wales Cricket Board
- Cricket format: Twenty20
- Tournament format: Knockout
- Host(s): England; Wales
- Champions: The Blaze
- Participants: 37
- Matches: 36

The 2026 Women's T20 County Cup, known for sponsorship reasons as the 2026 Vitality Women's T20 County Cup, was the second season of the Women's T20 County Cup, a professional women's Twenty20 cricket competition organised by the England and Wales Cricket Board. The tournament began on 26 April and concluded on 29 August 2026 with 37 teams featured, drawn mainly from the historic counties of England. Lancashire were the defending champions. The Blaze won the title, defeating Surrey by seven wickets in the final which was reduced to 13 overs per side due to rain.

== Teams ==
The teams that participated in the previous season will return for a second time.

Tier 1	Tier 2	Tier 3
Durham; Essex; Hampshire; Lancashire; Somerset; Surrey; The Blaze*; Warwickshire; Yorkshire*	Derbyshire; Glamorgan; Gloucestershire; Kent; Leicestershire; Middlesex; Northamptonshire; Sussex; Worcestershire	Bedfordshire*; Berkshire; Buckinghamshire; Cambridgeshire; Cheshire; Cornwall; Cumbria; Devon; Dorset; Herefordshire; Hertfordshire; Huntingdonshire*; Lincolnshire; Norfolk; Northumberland; Oxfordshire; Shropshire; Staffordshire; Suffolk; Wiltshire

- The Blaze represented Nottinghamshire.
- Bedfordshire & Huntingdonshire played as a combined team.
- Yorkshire was awarded Tier 1 status.

== Fixtures ==
=== Round One ===
Match 1
26 April 2026
Scorecard

Bedfordshire & Huntingdonshire; 130/7 (20 overs)	v	Lincolnshire; 126/5 (20 overs)
Holly Reeder 36 (26); Jess Thatcher 2/20 (4 overs)		Jess Thatcher 34* (46); Grace Tarling 2/30 (4 overs)

Bedfordshire & Huntingdonshire won by 4 runs
Lancot Park, Dunstable
Umpires: Anthony Levy and Chris Price

- Lincolnshire won the toss and elected to field.

Match 2
26 April 2026
Scorecard

Cheshire; 76 (17 overs)	v	Derbyshire; 80/3 (13.5 overs)
Ellie Mason 21 (22); Adrianna Darlow 3/9 (2 overs)		Tash Allen 37 (28); Peyton Hulme 1/14 (3 overs)

Derbyshire won by 7 wickets
The Copper Yard, Denby
Umpires: Pam Orton and Eloise Porter

- Derbyshire won the toss and elected to field.

Match 3
26 April 2026
Scorecard

Hertfordshire; 132/5 (20 overs)	v	Cambridgeshire; 105/8 (20 overs)
Kezia Hassall 52 (45); Abi Davis 1/19 (3 overs)		Kelly Haynes 40 (37); Sally Chapman 2/17 (4 overs)

Hertfordshire won by 27 runs
Exning Park, Exning
Umpires: Lizzie Conder and Simon Smith

- Cambridgeshire won the toss and elected to field.

Match 4
26 April 2026
Scorecard

Oxfordshire; 167/6 (20 overs)	v	Dorset; 146/6 (20 overs)
Sabrina Burrows 52 (47); Martha Appleby-Ingram 3/18 (3 overs)		Louisa Heap 62 (48); Chloe Westbury 2/22 (4 overs)

Oxfordshire won by 21 runs
Canford School Ground, Wimborne
Umpires: Nick Heckford and Phil Titterington

- Dorset won the toss and elected to field.

Match 5
26 April 2026
Scorecard

Glamorgan; 140/8 (20 overs)	v	Devon; 129/5 (20 overs)
Bethan Gammon 60* (48); Naomi Hillman-Bermejo 3/19 (4 overs)		Elle Golsworthy 31 (37); Katy Cobb 2/18 (4 overs)

Glamorgan won by 11 runs
Spytty Park, Newport
Umpires: Christopher Jones and Vaughan Thomas

- Devon won the toss and elected to field.

Match 6
26 April 2026
Scorecard

Gloucestershire; 186/5 (20 overs)	v	Cornwall; 79/7 (20 overs)
Meg Ahearne 60* (38); Sanj Kang-Mullen 3/22 (4 overs)		Evie Privett 43* (47); Alice Bird 2/9 (4 overs)

Gloucestershire won by 107 runs
Bristol County Ground, Bristol
Umpires: Lawson Mayor and Hemal Wijesuriya

- Gloucestershire won the toss and elected to bat.

Match 7
26 April 2026
Scorecard

Shropshire; 81 (18.5 overs)	v	Leicestershire; 85/3 (11.2 overs)
Libby Thomas 24 (24); Lucy Weston 5/19 (4 overs)		Lucy Western 43* (36); Lara Jones 2/17 (3.2 overs)

Leicestershire won by 7 wickets
Grace Road, Leicester
Umpires: Kelly Alcock and Erica Turner

- Leicestershire won the toss and elected to field.

Match 8
26 April 2026
Scorecard

Middlesex; 184/5 (20 overs)	v	Kent; 131/9 (20 overs)
Saskia Horley 96 (65); Sydney Gorham 2/30 (4 overs)		Zeena Bilal 34 (29); Anaya Patel 4/13 (4 overs)

Middlesex won by 53 runs
Brunton Memorial Ground, Radlett
Umpires: Rehma Chandaria and Todd Holland

- Middlesex won the toss and elected to bat.

Match 9
26 April 2026
Scorecard

Herefordshire; 97/6 (20 overs)	v	Northamptonshire; 98/1 (13 overs)
Georgie Williams 46* (35); Ella Phillips 2/12 (4 overs)		Amelia Kemp 54* (42); Amy Maund 1/14 (3 overs)

Northamptonshire won by 9 wickets
County Ground, Northampton
Umpires: Adam Hitchcock and Avril Welch

- Herefordshire won the toss and elected to bat.

Match 10
26 April 2026
Scorecard

Cumbria; 162/7 (20 overs)	v	Staffordshire; 131 (16.1 overs)
Laura Marshall 63 (35); Molly Dytham 2/29 (4 overs)		Megan Pittman 45 (27); Lauren Burrow 3/20 (4 overs)

Cumbria won by 31 runs
J & G Meakin Cricket Club, Hanley
Umpires: Matthew Brooks and Clare Gardner

- Cumbria won the toss and elected to bat.

Match 11
26 April 2026
Scorecard

Suffolk; 124/7 (20 overs)	v	Buckinghamshire; 125/3 (19.5 overs)
Sophie Hughes 54 (38); Eva Lewis 2/24 (4 overs)		Afra Rose Mohamed 44* (59); Analise Merritt 1/20 (3.5 overs)

Buckinghamshire won by 7 wickets
Old London Road, Copdock
Umpires: Tom Smith and Angela Tuff

- Buckinghamshire won the toss and elected to field.

Match 12
26 April 2026
Scorecard

Sussex; 83 (19.3 overs)	v	Norfolk; 84/5 (19.2 overs)
Emma Phillipson 22 (28); Jade Hoyte 3/11 (4 overs)		Bella Mae Borges 43* (46); Anna Buckle 3/10 (4 overs)

Norfolk won by 5 wickets
County Ground, Hove
Umpires: Mel Juniper and Aaron Page

- Norfolk won the toss and elected to field.

Match 13
26 April 2026
Scorecard

Berkshire; 125/8 (20 overs)	v	Wiltshire; 87/7 (20 overs)
Alex Avoth 35 (28); Emily Smith 3/11 (4 overs)		Carys Shah 26* (27); Emma MacEwen 2/21 (4 overs)

Berkshire won by 38 runs
Marlborough Cricket Club, Marlborough
Umpires: Richard Cunningham and Khalid Kazim

- Wiltshire won the toss and elected to field.

Match 14
26 April 2026
Scorecard

Worcestershire; 159/6 (20 overs)	v	Northumberland; 38 (14.2 overs)
Clare Boycott 54* (41); Millie Gray 2/22 (4 overs)		Sarah Vince 19 (33); Daisy Egerton 3/8 (4 overs)

Worcestershire won by 121 runs
Stourbridge Road, Himley
Umpires: James Cole and Dean Daniels

- Worcestershire won the toss and elected to bat.

=== Round Two ===
Match 15
17 May 2026
Scorecard

Oxfordshire; 151/5 (20 overs)	v	Gloucestershire; 155/4 (18.5 overs)
Emilia Bartram 58 (46); Liv Daniels 2/15 (4 overs)		Meg Ahearne 46 (30); Emilia Bartram 2/19 (3 overs)

Gloucestershire won by 6 wickets
St Edward's School, Oxford
Umpires: Erica Turner and Hemal Wijesuriya

- Gloucestershire won the toss and elected to field.

Match 16
17 May 2026
Scorecard

Glamorgan; 160/5 (20 overs)	v	Berkshire; 33 (14.2 overs)
Bethan Gammon 46* (27); Shayna Chikhlia 2/23 (3 overs)		Lily Bowlby 7 (18); Nicole Reid 4/4 (4 overs)

Glamorgan won by 127 runs
Wokingham Cricket Club, Wokingham
Umpires: Oliver Clarke and Dean Daniels

- Glamorgan won the toss and elected to bat.

Match 17
17 May 2026
Scorecard

Middlesex; 162/3 (20 overs)	v	Hertfordshire; 86/7 (20 overs)
Issy Routledge 89* (62); Cara Castleman 1/27 (4 overs)		Reese Nash 25 (47); Issy Routledge 3/5 (3 overs)

Middlesex won by 76 runs
Brunton Memorial Ground, Radlett
Umpires: Mel Juniper and Chris Price

- Hertfordshire won the toss and elected to field.

Match 18
17 May 2026
Scorecard

Buckinghamshire; 157/7 (20 overs)	v	Norfolk; 101/7 (20 overs)
Annie Townsend 51 (45); Amy Morris 3/26 (4 overs)		Jade Hoyte 23* (31); Zaynah Wani 4/16 (4 overs)

Buckinghamshire won by 56 runs
Ascott Park, Wing
Umpires: Simon Parbery and Amanda Wixon

- Norfolk won the toss and elected to field.

Match 19
17 May 2026
Scorecard

Worcestershire; 72/8 (16 overs)	v	Leicestershire; 3/0 (0.3 overs)
Megan Bishop 25 (31); Emma Thatcher 3/10 (4 overs)

No result (Worcestershire won the Bowl-out)
Grace Road, Leicester
Umpires: Adam Hitchcock and Mansoor Qureshi

- Leicestershire won the toss and elected to field.
- The match was limited to 16 overs per side due to rain.
- Rain prevented any further play.

Match 20
17 May 2026
Scorecard

Cumbria; 102/8 (20 overs)	v	Derbyshire; 106/3 (16.2 overs)
Laura Marshall 20 (14); Malisha Tennakoon 3/15 (4 overs)		Tash Allen 58* (49); Lauren Burrow 1/18 (4 overs)

Derbyshire won by 7 wickets
The Copper Yard, Denby
Umpires: Aviral Gupta and Avril Welch

- Derbyshire won the toss and elected to field.

Match 21
17 May 2026
Scorecard

Bedfordshire & Huntingdonshire; 56/8 (20 overs)	v	Northamptonshire; 59/2 (8.3 overs)
Emily Banks 16 (29); Ilenia Sims 2/6 (4 overs)		Gemma Marriott 28* (26); Anjali Mistry 1/3 (1 over)

Northamptonshire won by 8 wickets
West Lodge Park, Desborough
Umpires: Jon Block and Rehma Chandaria

- Bedfordshire & Huntingdonshire won the toss and elected to bat.

=== Round Three ===
Match 22
21 June 2026
Scorecard

Middlesex; 185/5 (20 overs)	v	Warwickshire; 188/2 (19.1 overs)
Saskia Horley 50 (25); Bethan Robinson 2/20 (4 overs)		Abbey Freeborn 79* (61); Saskia Horley 1/35 (4 overs)

Warwickshire won by 8 wickets
Brunton Memorial Ground, Radlett
Umpires: Julia Jarvis and Mel Juniper

- Warwickshire won the toss and elected to field.

Match 23
21 June 2026
Scorecard

Essex; 194/6 (20 overs)	v	Gloucestershire; 133/8 (20 overs)
Jo Gardner 36 (19); Emily Geach 2/23 (4 overs)		Meg Ahearne 37 (30); Kate Coppack 2/16 (4 overs)

Essex won by 61 runs
Castle Park Cricket Ground, Colchester
Umpires: Rose Fernando and Hemal Wijesuriya

- Gloucestershire won the toss and elected to field.

Match 24
21 June 2026
Scorecard

Somerset; 183/6 (20 overs)	v	Yorkshire; 174/7 (20 overs)
Niamh Holland 75 (44); Ines Blackwell 3/27 (4 overs)		Lauren Winfield-Hill 65 (33); Erin Vukusic 3/24 (4 overs)

Somerset won by 9 runs
North Marine Road Ground, Scarborough
Umpires: Naeem Ashraf and Andy Exton

- Somerset won the toss and elected to bat.

Match 25
21 June 2026
Scorecard

Durham; 167/5 (20 overs)	v	The Blaze; 168/2 (18.3 overs)
Hollie Armitage 81* (55); Maria Andrews 2/27 (4 overs)		Georgia Elwiss 93* (58); Sophia Turner 1/20 (3.3 overs)

The Blaze won by 8 wickets
Nottinghamshire Sports Ground, Nottingham
Umpires: Hassan Adnan and Mohammed Waseem

- The Blaze won the toss and elected to field.

Match 26
21 June 2026
Scorecard

Surrey; 171/7 (20 overs)	v	Worcestershire; 97/7 (20 overs)
Aylish Cranstone 34 (19); Lucy Harris 3/38 (4 overs)		Ebony Tweats 23 (27); Danielle Gregory 3/15 (4 overs)

Surrey won by 74 runs
Stourbridge Road, Himley
Umpires: Aviral Gupta and Anthony Harris

- Worcestershire won the toss and elected to field.

Match 27
21 June 2026
Scorecard

Hampshire; 201/3 (20 overs)	v	Glamorgan; 104/9 (20 overs)
Maia Bouchier 63 (42); Sara Phillips 1/26 (4 overs)		Gemma Porter 23 (35); Bex Tyson 3/25 (4 overs)

Hampshire won by 97 runs
Spytty Park, Newport
Umpires: Adam Hitchcock and Sam Hollingshead

- Hampshire won the toss and elected to bat.

Match 28
21 June 2026
Scorecard

Lancashire; 221/5 (20 overs)	v	Buckinghamshire; 111/7 (20 overs)
Eve Jones 64 (41); Zaynah Wani 2/30 (4 overs)		Cara Duggan 54* (45); Tara Norris 2/17 (4 overs)

Lancashire won by 110 runs
Parkgate Cricket Ground, Neston
Umpires: Kirsty Blackham and Surendiran Shanmugam

- Buckinghamshire won the toss and elected to field.

Match 29
21 June 2026
Scorecard

Northamptonshire; 195/4 (20 overs)	v	Derbyshire; 120/6 (20 overs)
Amelia Kemp 49 (31); Rhiannon Knowling-Davieso 2/35 (4 overs)		Aamna Khan 37 (36); Ella Phillips 2/20 (4 overs)

Northamptonshire won by 75 runs
The Copper Yard, Denby
Umpires: Amy Coyne and Jane Pratt

- Derbyshire won the toss and elected to field.

== Play-offs ==
=== Bracket ===
Round 3
T1	Surrey	171/7 (20 overs)
T2	Worcestershire	97/7 (20 overs)
T2	Middlesex	185/5 (20 overs)
T1	Warwickshire	188/2 (19.1 overs)
T1	Yorkshire	174/7 (20 overs)
T1	Somerset	183/6 (20 overs)
T2	Glamorgan	104/9 (20 overs)
T1	Hampshire	201/3 (20 overs)
T2	Northamptonshire	195/4 (20 overs)
T2	Derbyshire	120/6 (20 overs)
T2	Gloucestershire	133/8 (20 overs)
T1	Essex	194/6 (20 overs)
T1	The Blaze	168/2 (18.3 overs)
T1	Durham	167/5 (20 overs)
T3	Buckinghamshire	111/7 (20 overs)
T1	Lancashire	221/5 (20 overs)

Quarter-finals
T1	Surrey
T1	Warwickshire
T1	Somerset
T1	Hampshire
T2	Northamptonshire
T1	Essex
T1	The Blaze
T1	Lancashire

Semi-finals
QF1	Surrey
QF3	Somerset
QF2	Essex
QF4	The Blaze

Final
SF2W	Surrey	91/8 (13 overs)
SF1W	The Blaze	92/3 (12 overs)

=== Quarter-finals ===
Quarter-final 1
23 August 2026
11:30

Warwickshire	v	Surrey

Edgbaston Foundation Ground, Birmingham

Quarter-final 2
23 August 2026
14:00

Northamptonshire	v	Essex

County Ground, Northampton

Quarter-final 3
23 August 2026
14:30

Hampshire	v	Somerset

Utilita Bowl Nursery Ground, Southampton

Quarter-final 4
23 August 2026
14:30

The Blaze	v	Lancashire

Nottinghamshire Sports Ground, Nottingham

=== Semi-finals ===
Semi-final 1
29 August 2026
11:00
Scorecard

Essex; Essex 44/3 (6 Overs)	v	The blaze The Blaze 46/1 (3.3 overs)
Lissy Macloed 18(11); Kirstie Gordon 1-0-1-6		Emma Jones 26 (14); Sophia Smale 1-0-0-7

The Blaze win by 9 wickets
Old Trafford, Manchester
Umpires: Sue Redfern, Rose Dovey

- The Blaze won the toss and elected to field
- match reduced to 6 overs

Semi-final 2
29 August 2026
14:30
Scorecard

Somerset	v	Surrey

Surrey won by 2 runs
Old Trafford, Manchester
Umpires: Gabi Brown, Julia Jarvis

- Somerset won the toss and chose to field
- Match reduced to 6 overs

=== Final ===
Final
29 August 2026
18:45
Scorecard

Surrey; 91/8 (13 overs)	v	The Blaze; 92/3 (12 overs)
Kira Chathli 25(23); Kathryn Brice 3-0-4-18		Kathryn Bryce 38(30); Alice Monghan 2-0-2-13

The Blaze won by 7 wickets
Old Trafford, Manchester
Umpires: Rose Dovey and Sue Redfern Match referee Helen Pack

- The Blaze won the toss and elected to field.
- The match was reduced to 13 overs per side due to rain.

== See also ==
- 2026 Women's T20 Blast
- 2026 Women's One-Day Cup
