= 2025 Women's T20 County Cup =

English cricket tournament

2025 Vitality Women's T20 County Cup
- Dates: 5 – 26 May 2025
- Administrator: England and Wales Cricket Board
- Cricket format: Twenty20
- Tournament format: Knockout
- Host(s): England; Wales
- Champions: Lancashire (1st title)
- Participants: 37
- Matches: 36 (Note: While the matches were numbered 1-39, three of these were byes, leaving 36 matches actually played.)
- Most runs: Lauren Winfield-Hill (176) (Yorkshire)
- Most wickets: Sophie Ecclestone (11) (Lancashire)

The 2025 Women's T20 County Cup, known for sponsorship reasons as the 2025 Vitality Women's T20 County Cup, was the inaugural season of the Women's T20 County Cup, a professional women's Twenty20 cricket competition organised by the England and Wales Cricket Board. The tournament ran from 5 to 26 May 2025 and featured 37 teams, drawn mainly from the historic counties of England.

Lancashire won the inaugural title of Women's T20 County Cup after beating Surrey by 32 run in the final at Taunton.

== Teams ==
The tournament consist of 37 teams that competed in the tournament that were organized into 3 tier groups. Teams from tiers 2 and 3 started from the first round, while teams from tier 1 joined the competition in the third round. The teams were divided as follows:

Tier 1	Tier 2	Tier 3
Durham; Essex; Hampshire; Lancashire; Nottinghamshire; Somerset; Surrey; Warwickshire	Derbyshire; Glamorgan; Gloucestershire; Kent; Leicestershire; Middlesex; Northamptonshire; Sussex; Worcestershire; Yorkshire	Bedfordshire & Huntingdonshire; Berkshire; Buckinghamshire; Cambridgeshire; Cheshire; Cornwall; Cumbria; Devon; Dorset; Herefordshire; Hertfordshire; Lincolnshire; Norfolk; Northumberland; Oxfordshire; Shropshire; Staffordshire; Suffolk; Wiltshire

- The Blaze will represent Nottinghamshire.
- Bedfordshire & Huntingdonshire will play as a combined team.

== Knockout ==
=== Rounds 1-2 ===
Rounds 1-2

Round 1
T2	Yorkshire	205/3 (20)
T2	Derbyshire	83 (15.4)
T3	Cumbria	108/9 (20)
T3	Staffordshire	109/3 (15.1)
T2	Leicestershire
bye
T3	Cheshire	120/8 (20)
T3	Lincolnshire	110/5 (20)
T3	Shropshire	147/7 (20)
T3	Norfolk	101/7 (20)
T2	Worcestershire	96/8 (20)
T2	Northamptonshire	97/5 (16.2)
T3	Northumberland
bye
T3	Cambridgeshire	102/8 (20)
T3	Herefordshire	93/8 (20)
T2	Glamorgan	183/4 (20)
T2	Gloucestershire	150/5 (20)
T2	Sussex	124/8 (20)
T3	Buckinghamshire	78 (19.1)
T3	Berkshire	121/9 (20)
T3	Cornwall	114/8 (20)
T2	Middlesex	136/7 (20)
T2	Kent	139/5 (17.5)
T3	Oxfordshire	161/6 (20)
T3	Wiltshire	143 (19)
T3	Bedfordshire	131/7 (20)
T3	Hertfordshire	132/3 (19.4)
T3	Dorset	71 (19.4)
T3	Devon	75/6 (19.1)
T3	Suffolk
bye

Round 2
T2	Yorkshire	176/3 (20)
T3	Staffordshire	108 (19.5)
T2	Leicestershire	94/3 (12.1)
T3	Cheshire	93 (20)
T3	Shropshire	66 (16.3)
T2	Northamptonshire	137/6 (20)
T3	Northumberland	112/8 (20)
T3	Cambridgeshire	130/7 (20)
T2	Glamorgan	156/7 (20)
T2	Sussex	108/7 (20)
T3	Berkshire	115 (19.3)
T2	Kent	162/4 (20)
T3	Oxfordshire	191/7 (20)
T3	Hertfordshire	167/3 (20)
T3	Devon	67/6 (13.3)
T3	Suffolk	66/7 (14)

=== Last 16 ===
Last 16

Round 3
T1	Surrey	237/7 (20)
T1	Hampshire	180/9 (20)
T1	Somerset	124/9 (20), 8/2
T1	Durham (SO)	124/9 (20), 9/0
T3	Devon	98/4 (20)
T1	Warwickshire	136/8 (20)
T2	Yorkshire	188/4 (20)
T1	Essex	177/8 (20)
T2	Northamptonshire	75 (16.4)
T2	Leicestershire	116/8 (20)
T2	Glamorgan	86 (17.1)
T1	Lancashire	167/4 (20)
T1	The Blaze	99/0 (10.5)
T3	Oxfordshire	97 (19)
T3	Cambridgeshire	113/9 (20)
T2	Kent	193/2 (20)

Quarter-finals
T1	Surrey	194/4 (20)
T1	Durham	122 (19.1)
T1	Warwickshire	139/0 (15.1)
T2	Yorkshire	138 (17)
T2	Leicestershire	71 (19.5)
T1	Lancashire	180/4 (20)
T1	The Blaze	177/4 (20)
T2	Kent	71 (20)

Semi-finals
T1	Surrey	135/7 (19.4)
T1	Warwickshire	133/9 (20)
T1	Lancashire	91/3 (15)
T1	The Blaze	86/8 (16)

Final
T1	Surrey	140/7 (20)
T1	Lancashire	172/6 (20)

== Fixtures ==
In November 2024, the ECB announced the fixtures for the tournament.

=== Round One ===
Match 1
5 May 2025
Scorecard

Cheshire; 120/8 (20 overs)	v	Lincolnshire; 110/5 (20 overs)

Lincolnshire won by 10 runs
Caistor Cricket Club, Caistor

Match 2
5 May 2025
Scorecard

Cumbria; 108/9 (20 overs)	v	Staffordshire; 109/3 (15.1 overs)

Staffordshire won by 7 wickets
Riverway Sports Ground, Stafford

Match 3
5 May 2025

Northumberland	v	bye

Match 4
5 May 2025
Scorecard

Yorkshire; 205/3 (20 overs)	v	Derbyshire Falcons; 83 (15.4 overs)

Yorkshire won by 122 runs
St George's Road, Harrogate

Match 5
5 May 2025

Leicestershire	v	bye

Match 6
5 May 2025
Scorecard

Shropshire; 147/7 (20 overs)	v	Norfolk; 101/7 (20 overs)

Shropshire won by 46 runs
St Georges, Telford

Match 7
5 May 2025
Scorecard

Cambridgeshire; 102/8 (20 overs)	v	Herefordshire; 93/8 (20 overs)

Cambridgeshire won by 9 runs
Coventry and North Warwickshire Sports Club, Coventry

Match 8
5 May 2025
Scorecard

Worcestershire; 96/8 (20 overs)	v	Northamptonshire; 97/5 (16.2 overs)

Northamptonshire won by 5 wickets
County Ground, Northampton

Match 9
5 May 2025
Scorecard

Sussex; 124/8 (20 overs)	v	Buckinghamshire; 78 (19.1 overs)

Sussex won by 46 runs
County Ground, Hove

Match 10
5 May 2025

Suffolk	v	bye

Match 11
5 May 2025
Scorecard

Bedfordshire & Huntingdonshire; 131/7 (20 overs)	v	Hertfordshire; 132/3 (19.4 overs)

Hertfordshire won by 7 wickets
Lucas Lane Sports Club, Hitchin

Match 12
5 May 2025
Scorecard

Middlesex; 136/7 (20 overs)	v	Kent Spitfires; 139/5 (17.5 overs)

Kent won by 5 wickets
Brunton Memorial Ground, Radlett

Match 13
5 May 2025
Scorecard

Berkshire; 121/9 (20 overs)	v	Cornwall; 114/8 (20 overs)

Berkshire won by 7 runs
Falmouth Cricket Club, Falmouth

Match 14
5 May 2025
Scorecard

Oxfordshire; 161/6 (20 overs)	v	Wiltshire; 143 (19 overs)

Oxfordshire won by 18 runs
Corsham Cricket Club, Corsham

Match 15
5 May 2025
Scorecard

Dorset; 71 (19.4 overs)	v	Devon; 75/6 (19.1 overs)

Devon won by 4 wickets
Bournemouth Cricket Club, Hurn

Match 16
5 May 2025
Scorecard

Glamorgan; 183/4 (20 overs)	v	Gloucestershire; 150/5 (20 overs)

Glamorgan won by 33 runs
Newport Stadium, Newport

=== Round Two ===
Match 17
10 May 2025
Scorecard

Yorkshire; 176/3 (20 overs)	v	Staffordshire; 108 (19.5 overs)

Yorkshire won by 68 runs
Weetwood Playing Fields, Leeds

Match 18
10 May 2025
Scorecard

Cheshire; 93 (20 overs)	v	Leicestershire; 94/3 (12.1 overs)

Leicestershire won by 7 wickets
Grace Road, Leicester

Match 19
11 May 2025
Scorecard

Northamptonshire; 137/6 (20 overs)	v	Shropshire; 66 (16.3 overs)

Northamptonshire won by 71 runs
Soulton Road, Wem

Match 20
10 May 2025
Scorecard

Cambridgeshire; 130/7 (20 overs)	v	Northumberland; 112/8 (20 overs)

Cambridgeshire won by 18 runs
Corbridge Cricket Club, Corbridge

Match 21
10 May 2025
Scorecard

Glamorgan; 156/7 (20 overs)	v	Sussex Sharks; 108/7 (20 overs)

Glamorgan won by 48 runs
Sophia Gardens, Cardiff

Match 22
11 May 2025
Scorecard

Kent; 162/4 (20 overs)	v	Berkshire; 115 (19.3 overs)

Kent won by 47 runs
Sadler's End, Sindlesham

Match 23
10 May 2025
Scorecard

Oxfordshire; 191/7 (20 overs)	v	Hertfordshire; 167/3 (20 overs)

Oxfordshire won by 24 runs
St Edward's School Ground, Oxford

Match 24
11 May 2025
Scorecard

Suffolk; 66/7 (14 overs)	v	Devon; 67/6 (13.3 overs)

Devon won by 4 wickets
Ottermouth, Budleigh Salterton

- The match was reduced to 14 overs per side due to rain.

=== Round Three ===
Match 25
17 May 2025
Scorecard

Surrey; 237/7 (20 overs)	v	Hampshire; 180/9 (20 overs)

Surrey won by 57 runs
County Ground, Beckenham

Match 26
18 May 2025
Scorecard

Warwickshire; 136/8 (20 overs)	v	Devon; 98/4 (20 overs)

Warwickshire won by 38 runs
Ottermouth, Budleigh Salterton

Match 27
17 May 2025
Scorecard

Leicestershire; 116/8 (20 overs)	v	Northamptonshire; 75 (16.4 overs)

Leicestershire won by 41 runs
County Cricket Ground, Northampton

Match 28
17 May 2025
Scorecard

Lancashire; 167/4 (20 overs)	v	Glamorgan; 86 (17.1 overs)

Lancashire won by 81 runs
Christ College, Brecon

Match 29
17 May 2025
Scorecard

Yorkshire; 188/4 (20 overs)	v	Essex Eagles; 177/8 (20 overs)

Yorkshire won by 11 runs
Headingley, Leeds

Match 30
17 May 2025
Scorecard

Oxfordshire; 97 (19 overs)	v	The Blaze; 99/0 (10.5 overs)

The Blaze won by 10 wickets
Nottinghamshire Sports Ground, Nottingham

Match 31
17 May 2025
Scorecard

Kent; 193/2 (20 overs)	v	Cambridgeshire; 113/9 (20 overs)

Kent won by 80 runs
Fenner's, Cambridge

Match 32
16 May 2025
Scorecard

Durham; 124/9 (20 overs)	v	Somerset; 124/9 (20 overs)

Match tied (Durham won the Super Over)
The Maer Ground, Exmouth

- Super Over: Durham 9/0, Somerset 8/2

=== Quarter-finals ===
Match 33 (QF1)
23 May 2025
13:30
Scorecard

Lancashire; 180/4 (20 overs)	v	Leicestershire; 71 (19.5 overs)
Eleanor Threlkeld 45 (27); Holly Whitfield 1/25 (4 overs)		Lucy Weston 14 (21); Tara Norris 3/7 (4 overs)

Lancashire won by 109 runs
Kibworth Cricket Club New Ground
Umpires: Gabi Brown and Anthony Harris

- Leicestershire won the toss and elected to field.

Match 34 (QF2)
23 May 2025
14:30
Scorecard

Surrey; 194/4 (20 overs)	v	Durham; 122 (19.1 overs)
Emma Jones 88* (49); Mady Villiers 2/42 (4 overs)		Phoebe Turner 27 (22); Ryana MacDonald-Gay 2/22 (4 overs)

Surrey won by 72 runs
Woodbridge Road, Guildford
Umpires: Neil Bainton and Mark Newell

- Durham won the toss and elected to field.

Match 35 (QF3)
24 May 2025
11:00
Scorecard

The Blaze; 177/4 (20 overs)	v	Kent; 71 (17 overs)
Sarah Bryce 94* (61); Isabella James 2/22 (4 overs)		Elsa Barnfather 13 (17); Cassidy McCarthy 3/3 (3 overs)

The Blaze won by 106 runs
St Lawrence Ground, Canterbury
Umpires: Julia Jarvis and Neil Bainton

- Kent won the toss and elected to field.

Match 36 (QF4)
24 May 2025
14:30
Scorecard

Yorkshire; 138 (20 overs)	v	Warwickshire; 139/0 (15.1 overs)
Erin Thomas 39 (21); Millie Taylor 3/17 (4 overs)		Abigail Freeborn 79 (47); Olivia Thomas 0/21 (3.1 overs)

Warwickshire won by 10 wickets
Weetwood Playing Fields, Leeds
Umpires: Jasmine Naeem and Simon Widdup

- Warwickshire won the toss and elected to field.

=== Semi-finals ===
Match 37 (SF1)
26 May 2025
11:00
Scorecard

Warwickshire; 133/9 (20 overs)	v	Surrey; 135/7 (19.4 overs)
Amuruthaa Surenkumar 26 (31); Danielle Gregory 3/20 (4 overs)		Kalea Moore 35 (31); Hannah Baker 3/25 (4 overs)

Surrey won by 3 wickets
County Ground, Taunton
Umpires: Gabi Brown and Amy Clark

- Surrey won the toss and elected to field.

Match 38 (SF2)
26 May 2025
14:30
Scorecard

The Blaze; 86/8 (16 overs)	v	Lancashire; 91/3 (15 overs)
Marie Kelly 23 (12); Sophie Ecclestone 3/19 (4 overs)		Seren Smale 35* (42); Grace Ballinger 1/15 (3 overs)

Lancashire won by 7 wickets (DLS method)
County Ground, Taunton
Umpires: Amy Clark and Julia Jarvis

- Lancashire won the toss and elected to field.
- The match was reduced to 16 overs per side due to rain.
- Lancashire were set a revised target of 90 from 16 overs due to rain.

=== Final ===
Match 39 (Final)
26 May 2025
18:45 (N)
Scorecard

Lancashire; 172/6 (20 overs)	v	Surrey; 140/7 (20 overs)
Tilly Kesteven 77 (60); Kalea Moore 4/27 (4 overs)		Phoebe Franklin 44 (36); Sophie Ecclestone 4/12 (4 overs)

Lancashire won by 32 runs
County Ground, Taunton
Umpires: Gabi Brown and Julia Jarvis

- Surrey won the toss and elected to field.

== See also ==
- 2025 Women's T20 Blast
- 2025 Women's One-Day Cup
