= 2025 Women's T20 Blast =

Women's T20 cricket tournament in England

2025 Women's Vitality Blast
- Dates: 30 May – 27 July 2025
- Administrator: England and Wales Cricket Board
- Cricket format: Twenty20
- Host(s): England; Wales
- Champions: League One : Surrey (1st title); League Two: Middlesex (1st title)
- Participants: League One: 8 League Two: 10
- Matches: League One: 59; League Two: 43
- Most runs: League One: Suzie Bates (Durham) (439); League Two: Finty Trussler (Middlesex) (316)
- Most wickets: League One: Millie Taylor (Birmingham Bears) (22); League Two: Ria Fackrell (Yorkshire) (16)
- Official website: Vitality Blast

The 2025 Women's T20 Blast (also known as 2025 Women's Vitality Blast for sponsorship reasons) was the inaugural season of the Women's T20 Blast, a professional Twenty20 county cricket competition in England and Wales. The tournament was held from 30 May to 27 July 2025, with eighteen county teams taking part.

The tournament ran alongside the 2025 T20 Blast. In the finals, Surrey defeated Birmingham Bears to become champions of League One while Middlesex defeated Yorkshire to become champions of League Two.

== Format ==
The tournament was split into two categories: one contested by the eight counties in League One and the second featuring the 10 remaining teams split into two groups in League Two.

== Teams ==
Eight teams from League One is competing in the inaugural season: the Birmingham Bears, Durham, Essex Eagles, Hampshire Hawks, Lancashire Thunder, Somerset, Surrey and The Blaze (Nottinghamshire). Glamorgan and Yorkshire Vikings will be awarded tier-one status and join the league in 2027, while a further two clubs will be awarded tier-one status in 2029.

The remaining ten teams is competing in League Two in which each county plays eight group-stage matches (home-and-away) against the other four counties in their group. The top two teams from each group will progress to Finals Day. The teams are divided into the following groups:

North Group	South Group
Derbyshire Falcons; Leicestershire Foxes; Northants Steelbacks; Worcestershire Rapids; Yorkshire Vikings	Glamorgan; Gloucestershire; Kent Spitfires; Middlesex; Sussex Sharks

== Points table ==
=== League One ===
Pos	Team	Pld	W	L	T	NR	BP	Pts	NRR	Qualification
1	Surrey	14	11	1	1	1	4	52	1.256	Advance to Final
2	The Blaze	14	8	2	1	3	2	42	0.749	Advance to Eliminator
3	Birmingham Bears	14	8	5	1	0	2	36	0.525	Advance to Eliminator
4	Lancashire Thunder	14	7	6	1	0	1	31	−0.105	
5	Durham	14	5	7	0	2	1	25	−0.523	
6	Hampshire Hawks	14	5	9	0	0	1	21	−0.336	
7	Essex Eagles	14	4	9	1	0	1	19	−0.296	
8	Somerset	14	1	10	1	2	0	10	−1.234	

Source: ESPNcricinfo, BBC Sport

=== League Two ===
==== North Group ====
Pos	Team	Pld	W	L	NR	BP	Pts	NRR	Qualification
1	Yorkshire	8	8	0	0	6	38	1.831	Advance to Finals Day
2	Leicestershire Foxes	8	4	4	0	1	17	0.001	Advance to Finals Day
3	Northamptonshire Steelbacks	8	3	4	1	0	14	−0.899	
4	Worcestershire Rapids	8	2	5	1	1	11	−0.107	
5	Derbyshire Falcons	8	2	6	0	0	8	−0.774	

Source: ESPNcricinfo, BBC Sport

==== South Group ====
Pos	Team	Pld	W	L	NR	BP	Pts	NRR	Qualification
1	Middlesex	8	7	1	0	2	30	0.772	Advance to Finals Day
2	Glamorgan	8	5	2	1	2	24	0.945	Advance to Finals Day
3	Sussex Sharks	8	4	4	0	2	18	0.609	
4	Kent Spitfires	8	2	5	1	0	10	−1.056	
5	Gloucestershire	8	1	7	0	1	5	−1.361	

Source: ESPNcricinfo, BBC Sports

== League One ==
=== May ===
Match 1
30 May 2025
15:00
Scorecard

Hampshire Hawks; 215/3 (20 overs)	v	Essex; 190/7 (20 overs)
Maia Bouchier 92 (53); Esmae MacGregor 2/42 (4 overs)		Lauren Winfield-Hill 69 (42); Bex Tyson 3/40 (4 overs)

Hampshire Hawks won by 25 runs
Rose Bowl, Southampton
Umpires: Julia Jarvis and Surendiran Shanmugam

- Essex won the toss and elected to field.
- Points: Hampshire Hawks 4, Essex 0

Match 2
30 May 2025
14:30
Scorecard

Birmingham Bears; 160/8 (20 overs)	v	The Blaze; 160/4 (20 overs)
Charis Pavely 46 (34); Kirstie Gordon 2/26 (4 overs)		Kathryn Bryce 60* (53); Amu Surenkumar 1/21 (3 overs)

Match tied
Trent Bridge, Nottingham
Umpires: Gabi Brown and Simon Widdup

- Birmingham Bears won the toss and elected to bat.
- Points: Warwickshire Bears 2, The Blaze 2

Match 3
30 May 2025
14:30
Scorecard

Somerset; 131/6 (20 overs)	v	Surrey; 135/2 (15.3 overs)
Alex Griffiths 36 (37); Tilly Corteen-Coleman 2/21 (4 overs)		Paige Scholfield 63 (48); Ellie Anderson 1/20 (3 overs)

Surrey won by 8 wickets
County Ground, Taunton
Umpires: Rose Fernando and Ben Peverall

- Surrey won the toss and elected to field.
- Points: Surrey 5, Somerset 0

Match 4
31 May 2025
12:00
Scorecard

Birmingham Bears; 193/6 (20 overs)	v	Durham; 151 (19 overs)
Davina Perrin 87 (61); Suzie Bates 2/23 (3 overs)		Suzie Bates 65 (41); Georgia Davis 3/27 (4 overs)

Birmingham Bears won by 42 runs
Edgbaston, Birmingham
Umpires: Gabi Brown and Surendiran Shanmugam
Player of the match: Laura Harris (Birmingham Bears)

- Birmingham Bears won the toss and elected to bat.
- Points: Birmingham Bears 5, Durham 0

Match 5
31 May 2025
12:00
Scorecard

Lancashire Thunder; 169/4 (20 overs)	v	The Blaze; 170/3 (19.1 overs)
Katie Mack 59 (37); Cassidy McCarthy 1/13 (2 overs)		Georgia Elwiss 53 (43); Mahika Gaur 2/24 (4 overs)

The Blaze won by 7 wickets
Old Trafford, Manchester
Umpires: Amy Clark and Neil Pratt

- The Blaze won the toss and elected to field.
- Points: The Blaze 4, Lancashire Thunder 0

=== June ===
Match 6
1 June 2025
12:00
Scorecard

Lancashire Thunder; 140/7 (20 overs)	v	Durham; 122 (18.4 overs)
Eleanor Threlkeld 48 (45); Suzie Bates 2/21 (2 overs)		Suzie Bates 49 (38); Grace Potts 4/33 (4 overs)

Lancashire Thunder won by 18 runs
Riverside Ground, Chester-le-Street
Umpires: Amy Clark and Michael Gough

- Durham won the toss and elected to field.
- Points: Lancashire Thunder 4, Durham 0

Match 7
1 June 2025
13:00
Scorecard

Essex; 149/7 (20 overs)	v	Somerset; 84 (14.2 overs)
Lauren Winfield-Hill 42 (25); Ellie Anderson 3/19 (4 overs)		Fran Wilson 25 (19); Esmae MacGregor 4/8 (3.2 overs)

Essex won by 65 runs
County Ground, Chelmsford
Umpires: Rose Fernando and Chris Watts

- Somerset won the toss and elected to field.
- Points: Essex 5, Somerset 0

Match 8
4 June 2025
18:00 (D/N)
Scorecard

Essex; 154/4 (14 overs)	v	Birmingham Bears; 139/8 (14 overs)
Alice Macleod 44 (24); Millie Taylor 2/27 (2 overs)		Sterre Kalis 52 (25); Esmae MacGregor 3/22 (3 overs)

Essex won by 19 runs (DLS method)
County Ground, Derby
Umpires: Rob Bailey and Gabi Brown

- Birmingham Bears won the toss and elected to field.
- The match was reduced to 14 overs per side due to rain.
- Birmingham Bears were set a revised target of 159 runs from 14 overs due to rain.
- Points: Essex 4, Birmingham Bears 0

Match 9
4 June 2025
14:30
Scorecard

Lancashire Thunder; 122/8 (20 overs)	v	Hampshire Hawks; 125/2 (19 overs)
Ailsa Lister 37* (20); Rebecca Tyson 3/27 (4 overs)		Ella McCaughan 68* (57); Darcey Carter 1/21 (4 overs)

Hampshire Hawks won by 8 wickets
Old Trafford, Manchester
Umpires: Jasmine Naeem and Steve O'Shaughnessy

- Hampshire Hawks won the toss and elected to field.
- Points: Hampshire Hawks 4, Lancashire Thunder 0

Match 10
5 June 2025
14:00
Scorecard

Surrey; 213/4 (20 overs)	v	Hampshire Hawks; 181/8 (20 overs)
Grace Harris 63 (35); Freya Davies 2/36 (4 overs)		Ella McCaughan 81 (50); Grace Harris 3/18 (3 overs)

Surrey won by 32 runs
The Oval, London
Umpires: Julia Jarvis and Ben Peverall

- Hampshire Hawks won the toss and elected to field.
- Points: Surrey 4, Hampshire 0

Match 11
6 June 2025
15:00
Scorecard

Birmingham Bears; 172/9 (20 overs)	v	Somerset; 103/9 (20 overs)
Laura Harris 77 (34); Mollie Robbins 3/34 (3 overs)		Fran Wilson 31 (32); Georgia Davis 3/12 (4 overs)

Birmingham Bears won by 69 runs
Edgbaston, Birmingham
Umpires: Gabi Brown and Rose Fernando

- Somerset won the toss and elected to field.
- Points: Birmingham Bears 5, Somerset 0

Match 12
6 June 2025
15:00
Scorecard

Essex; 104 (20 overs)	v	The Blaze; 106/3 (14.1 overs)
Jo Gardner 22 (22); Kathryn Bryce 2/11 (3.5 overs)		Kathryn Bryce 51* (51); Esmae MacGregor 2/28 (3 overs)

The Blaze won by 7 wickets
County Ground, Derby
Umpires: Jasmine Naeem and Simon Widdup

- Essex won the toss and elected to bat.
- The Blaze 5, Essex 0

Match 13
7 June 2025
14:30
Scorecard

Durham; 119/6 (20 overs)	v	Hampshire Hawks; 33/2 (6 overs)
Suzie Bates 34 (33); Freya Davies 2/20 (4 overs)		Maia Bouchier 22* (21); Katie Levick 1/3 (1 over)

Durham won by 1 run (DLS
Arundel Castle Cricket Ground, Arundel
Umpires: Anna Harris and Julia Jarvis

- Hampshire Hawks won the toss and elected to field.
- No further play was possible due to rain.
- Points: Durham 4, Hampshire Hawks 0

Match 14
7 June 2025
13:00
Scorecard

Lancashire Thunder; 85/6 (11 overs)	v	Surrey; 62/4 (8 overs)
Fi Morris 29 (25); Kalea Moore 2/14 (2 overs)		Danni Wyatt-Hodge 25 (16); Tara Norris 2/5 (1 over)

Surrey won by 2 runs (DLS method)
Old Trafford, Manchester
Umpires: Jasmine Naeem and Simon Widdup

- Surrey won the toss and elected to field.
- The match was reduced to 11 overs per side due to rain.
- No further play was possible due to rain.
- Points: Surrey 4, Lancashire 0

Match 15
7 June 2025
15:00
Scorecard

Somerset	v	The Blaze

No result
Trent Bridge, Nottingham
Umpires: Amy Clark and Neil Pratt

- The Blaze won the toss and elected to field.
- No play was possible due to rain.
- Points: The Blaze 2, Somerset 0

Match 16
8 June 2025
12:00
Scorecard

Lancashire Thunder; 162/7 (20 overs)	v	Birmingham Bears; 157/9 (20 overs)
Ailsa Lister 39 (26); Millie Taylor 2/25 (3 overs)		Natasha Wraith 58* (34); Tara Norris 3/25 (4 overs)

Lancashire Thunder won by 5 runs
Edgbaston, Birmingham
Umpires: Gabi Brown and Simon Widdup

- Birmingham Bears won the toss and elected to field.
- Points: Lancashire Thunder 4, Birmingham Bears 0

Match 17
8 June 2025
14:00
Scorecard

Durham; 141/5 (20 overs)	v	Surrey; 143/1 (12.5 overs)
Hollie Armitage 50* (49); Ryana MacDonald-Gay 4/16 (4 overs)		Danni Wyatt-Hodge 74* (36); Phoebe Turner 1/27 (3 overs)

Surrey won by 9 wickets
The Oval, London
Umpires: Rose Fernando and Nigel Llong

- Durham won the toss and elected to bat.
- Points: Surrey 5, Durham 0

Match 18
11 June 2025
14:30
Scorecard

Durham; 162/5 (20 overs)	v	Birmingham Bears; 165/3 (18.2 overs)
Mady Villiers 85* (56); Issy Wong 2/19 (3 overs)		Natasha Wraith 56 (36); Katie Levick 2/30 (4 overs)

Birmingham Bears won by 5 wickets
Riverside Ground, Chester-le-Street
Umpires: Jasmine Naeem and Simon Widdup

- Durham won the toss and elected to bat.
- Points: Birmingham Bears 4, Durham 0

Match 19
11 June 2025
18:30 (D/N)
Scorecard

The Blaze; 169/9 (20 overs)	v	Surrey; 152 (19.5 overs)
Georgia Elwiss 61 (46); Grace Harris 2/30 (4 overs)		Danni Wyatt-Hodge 60 (33); Kirstie Gordon 3/35 (4 overs)

The Blaze won by 17 runs
The Oval, London
Umpires: Gabi Brown and Ben Peverall

- Surrey won the toss and elected to field.
- Points: The Blaze 4, Surrey 0

Match 20
12 June 2025
14:30
Scorecard

Hampshire Hawks; 195/2 (20 overs)	v	Essex; 153/8 (20 overs)
Ella McCaughan 106 (60); Grace Scrivens 2/32 (4 overs)		Alice Macleod 30 (18); Georgia Adams 4/26 (4 overs)

Hampshire Hawks 42 runs
County Ground, Chelmsford
Umpires: Rose Fernando and Surendiran Shanmugam
Player of the match: Ella McCaughan (Hampshire Hawks)

- Essex won the toss and elected to field.
- Points: Hampshire Hawks 5, Essex 0

Match 21
13 June 2025
18:30 (D/N)
Scorecard

Durham; 188/5 (20 overs)	v	The Blaze; 190/3 (19 overs)
Suzie Bates 77 (58); Sarah Glenn 2/21 (4 overs)		Tammy Beaumont 81 (44); Phoebe Turner 1/26 (3 overs)

The Blaze won by 7 wickets
Riverside Ground, Chester-le-Street
Umpires: Amy Clark and James Middlebrook

- The Blaze won the toss and elected to field.
- Points: The Blaze 4, Durham 0

Match 22
13 June 2025
18:30 (D/N)
Scorecard

Somerset; 132/7 (20 overs)	v	Lancashire Thunder; 133/6 (19.4 overs)
Alex Griffiths 27 (18); Kate Cross 3/21 (4 overs)		Emma Lamb 32 (32); Charlie Dean 4/9 (4 overs)

Lancashire Thunder won by 4 wickets
County Ground, Taunton
Umpires: Gabi Brown and Ben Peverall

- Lancashire Thunder won the toss and elected to field.
- Points: Lancashire Thunder 4, Somerset 0

Match 23
15 June 2025
15:00
Scorecard

Birmingham Bears; 178/7 (20 overs)	v	Hampshire Hawks; 165/7 (20 overs)
Meg Austin 51 (38); Daisy Gibb 3/25 (4 overs)		Georgia Adams 32 (31); Millie Taylor 2/19 (3 overs)

Birmingham Bears won by 13 runs
Edgbaston, Birmingham
Umpires: Neil Bainton and Jasmine Naeem

- Hampshire Hawks won the toss and elected to field.
- Points: Birmingham Bears 4, Hampshire Hawks 0

Match 24
15 June 2025
14:00
Scorecard

Essex; 148/7 (20 overs)	v	Surrey; 150/5 (18.3 overs)
Grace Scrivens 39 (29); Tash Farrant 3/20 (4 overs)		Kira Chathli 40* (34); Esmae MacGregor 3/33 (4 overs)

Surrey won by 5 wickets
County Ground, Chelmsford

- Essex won the toss and elected to bat.
- Points: Surrey 4, Essex 0

Match 25
15 June 2025
12:00
Scorecard

Somerset; 138/7 (20 overs)	v	Durham; 139/6 (18.1 overs)
Rebecca Odgers 36 (33); Mady Villiers 2/23 (4 overs)		Suzie Bates 49 (38); Mollie Robbins 3/22 (3 overs)

Durham won by 4 wickets
County Ground, Taunton
Umpires: Ben Peverall and Sue Redfern

- Durham won the toss and elected to field.
- Points: Durham 4, Somerset 0

Match 26
17 June 2025
15:00
Scorecard

Hampshire Hawks; 155/4 (20 overs)	v	Surrey; 156/5 (20 overs)
Charli Knott 74* (61); Danielle Gregory 2/22 (4 overs)		Danni Wyatt-Hodge 65 (40); Mary Taylor 2/19 (2 overs)

Surrey won by 5 wickets
Rose Bowl, Southampton
Umpires: Rose Fernando and James Tredwell
Player of the match: Danni Wyatt-Hodge (Surrey)

- Hampshire Hawks won the toss and elected to bat.
- Points: Surrey 4, Hampshire Hawks 0

Match 27
18 June 2025
11:30
Scorecard

Essex; 150/3 (20 overs)	v	Birmingham Bears; 154/8 (19.5 overs)
Cordelia Griffith 47* (36); Hannah Baker 1/22 (3 overs)		Charis Pavely 68 (40); Charis Pavely 2/21 (4 overs)

Birmingham Bears won by 2 wickets
Edgbaston, Birmingham
Umpires: Rob Bailey and Russell Warren

- Essex won the toss and elected to bat.
- Points: Birmingham Bears 4, Essex 0

Match 28
18 June 2025
14:00
Scorecard

Surrey; 171/9 (20 overs)	v	Lancashire Thunder; 118 (17.3 overs)
Grace Harris 57 (31); Sophie Morris 2/38 (4 overs)		Emma Lamb 64 (46); Ryana MacDonald-Gay 4/14 (3.3 overs)

Surrey won by 53 runs
The Oval, London
Umpires: Surendiran Shanmugam and Rob White

- Lancashire Thunder won the toss and elected to field.
- Points: Surrey 4, Lancashire Thunder 0

Match 29
19 June 2025
14:30
Scorecard

Lancashire Thunder; 150/9 (20 overs)	v	The Blaze; 153/5 (18.2 overs)
Ailsa Lister 79 (38); Heather Graham 3/36 (4 overs)		Georgia Elwiss 43* (30); Tara Norris 2/23 (4 overs)

The Blaze won by 5 wickets
Grace Road, Leicester
Umpires: Gabi Brown and Jack Shantry
Player of the match: Georgia Elwiss (The Blaze)

- The Blaze won the toss and elected to field.
- Points: The Blaze 4, Lancashire Thunder 0

Match 30
19 June 2025
14:30
Scorecard

Hampshire Hawks; 169/6 (20 overs)	v	Somerset; 164/6 (20 overs)
Freya Kemp 65* (38); Charlie Dean 3/25 (4 overs)		Niamh Holland 60 (53); Linsey Smith 2/26 (4 overs)

Hampshire Hawks won by 5 runs
County Ground, Taunton
Umpires: Anthony Harris and Surendiran Shanmugam

- Hampshire Hawks won the toss and elected to bat.
- Points: Hampshire Hawks 4, Somerset 0

Match 31
20 June 2025
14:30
Scorecard

Birmingham Bears; 172/6 (20 overs)	v	The Blaze; 147/8 (20 overs)
Sterre Kalis 54 (41); Kathryn Bryce 4/21 (4 overs)		Tammy Beaumont 44 (29); Em Arlott 3/33 (4 overs)

Birmingham Bears won by 25 runs
Edgbaston, Birmingham
Umpires: Anna Harris and Sue Redfern

- Birmingham Bears won the toss and elected to bat.
- Points: Birmingham Bears 4, The Blaze 0

Match 32
20 June 2025
15:00
Scorecard

Durham; 101/8 (20 overs)	v	Essex; 105/4 (17 overs)
Hollie Armitage 47 (50); Kate Coppack 2/16 (3 overs)		Lauren Winfield-Hill 29 (22); Mady Villiers 2/19 (4 overs)

Essex won by 6 wickets
Riverside Ground, Chester-le-Street
Umpires: Amy Clark and Michael Gough

- Essex won the toss and elected to field.
- Points: Essex 4, Durham 0

=== July ===
Match 33
4 July 2025
14:30
Scorecard

Durham; 154/4 (20 overs)	v	Somerset; 148/7 (20 overs)
Suzie Bates 48 (37); Chloe Skelton 1/26 (4 overs)		Rebecca Odgers 54 (37); Mady Villiers 2/24 (4 overs); Sophia Turner 2/24 (4 overs)

Durham won by 6 wickets
Riverside Ground, Chester-le-Street
Umpires: Jasmine Naeem and Neil Pratt

- Somerset won the toss and elected to field.
- Points: Durham 4, Somerset 0

Match 34
4 July 2025
15:30
Scorecard

The Blaze; 188/6 (20 overs)	v	Hampshire Hawks; 151 (18.1 overs)
Heather Graham 73 (47); Ellyse Perry 2/23 (3 overs)		Rhianna Southby 64 (42); Kathryn Bryce 4/13 (3.1 overs)

The Blaze won by 37 runs
Queen's Park, Chesterfield
Umpires: Amy Clark and Anthony Harris

- Hampshire Hawks won the toss and elected to field.
- Points: The Blaze 4, Hampshire 0

Match 35
5 July 2025
11:00
Scorecard

Essex; 47/7 (8 overs)	v	Lancashire Thunder; 55/2 (6 overs)
Lauren Winfield-Hill 13 (18); Kate Cross 2/9 (2 overs)		Emma Lamb 21 (17); Eva Gray 1/7 (1 over)

Lancashire Thunder won by 8 wickets (DLS method)
Old Trafford, Manchester
Umpires: Naeem Ashraf and Grace Bambury

- Lancashire Thunder won the toss and elected to field.
- The match was reduced to 8 overs per side due to rain.
- Lancashire Thunder were set a revised target of 52 runs off 8 overs due to rain.
- Points: Lancashire Thunder 4, Essex 0

Match 36
6 July 2025
11:00
Scorecard

Somerset; 153/8 (20 overs)	v	Hampshire Hawks; 154/2 (19.4 overs)
Fran Wilson 55 (32); Freya Davies 3/38 (4 overs)		Rhianna Southby 57 (51); Amanda-Jade Wellington 1/23 (4 overs)

Hampshire Hawks won by 8 wickets
Rose Bowl, Southampton
Umpires: Ian Blackwell and Rose Fernando

- Somerset won the toss and elected to bat.
- Points: Hampshire Hawks 4, Somerset 0

Match 37
6 July 2025
13:00
Scorecard

Birmingham Bears; 123/7 (20 overs)	v	Lancashire Thunder; 124/3 (18.3 overs)
Katie George 30* (33); Alana King 2/16 (4 overs)		Emma Lamb 60* (48); Phoebe Brett 2/15 (4 overs)

Lancashire Thunder won by 7 wickets
Old Trafford, Manchester
Umpires: Jasmine Naeem and Jack Shantry

- Lancashire Thunder won the toss and elected to field.
- Points: Lancashire Thunder 4, Birmingham Bears 0

Match 38
6 July 2025
11:00
Scorecard

Durham; 16/1 (4.1 overs)	v	The Blaze
Emma Marlow 9* (10); Grace Ballinger 1/3 (1.1 over)

No result
Trent Bridge, Nottingham
Umpires: Amy Clark and Chris Watts

- The Blaze won the toss and elected to field.
- No further play was possible due to rain.
- Points: Durham 2, The Blaze 2

Match 39
6 July 2025
12:00
Scorecard

Surrey; 159/5 (20 overs)	v	Essex; 93/5 (10 overs)
Phoebe Franklin 48* (23); Eva Gray 2/18 (4 overs)		Lauren Winfield-Hill 49 (27); Priyanaz Chatterji 2/12 (2 overs)

Match tied (DLS method)
The Oval, London
Umpires: Neil Bainton and Gabi Brown

- Essex won the toss and elected to field.
- Essex were set a revised target of 94 runs from 10 overs due to rain.
- No further play was possible due to rain.
- Points: Essex 2, Surrey 2

Match 40
8 July 2025
14:30
Scorecard

Essex; 155/5 (20 overs)	v	Somerset; 156/6 (19.3 overs)
Jodi Grewcock 45 (34); Alex Griffiths 1/18 (2 overs)		Fran Wilson 41 (32); Esmae MacGregor 3/19 (4 overs)

Essex won by 4 wickets
County Ground, Taunton
Umpires: Rose Fernando and Ben Peverall

- Somerset won the toss and elected to field.
- Points: Essex 4, Somerset 0

Match 41
9 July 2025
15:00
Scorecard

Birmingham Bears; 139 (19.3 overs)	v	Surrey; 140/6 (19.4 overs)
Sterre Kalis 38 (30); Alice Davidson-Richards 3/11 (2.3 overs)		Emma Jones 46 (39); Millie Taylor 2/29 (4 overs)

Surrey won by 4 wickets
Edgbaston, Birmingham
Umpires: Michael Gough and Jasmine Naeem

- Birmingham Bears won the toss and elected to bat.
- Points: Surrey 4, Birmingham Bears 0

Match 42
9 July 2025
14:00
Scorecard

Hampshire Hawks; 173/5 (20 overs)	v	Lancashire Thunder; 175/2 (19 overs)
Freya Kemp 63 (43); Alana King 2/40 (4 overs)		Emma Lamb 66* (45); Georgia Adams 1/20 (3 overs)

Lancashire Thunder won by 8 wickets
Enborne Lodge, Newbury
Umpires: Hassan Adnan and Rose Fernando

- Lancashire Thunder won the toss and elected to field.
- Points: Lancashire Thunder 4, Hampshire Hawks 0

Match 43
11 July 2025
18:30 (D/N)
Scorecard

Hampshire; 103/7 (20 overs)	v	Durham; 104/5 (15.2 overs)
Rhianna Southby 25 (30); Phoebe Turner 3/17 (4 overs)		Emily Windsor 36* (23); Freya Davies 1/9 (2 overs)

Durham won by 5 wickets
Riverside Ground, Chester-le-Street
Umpires: Amy Clark and Simon Widdup

- Hampshire won the toss and elected to bat.
- Points: Durham 5, Hampshire 0

Match 44
11 July 2025
14:30
Scorecard

Surrey; 132/9 (20 overs)	v	The Blaze; 122/5 (20 overs)
Alice Davidson-Richards 27 (23); Sarah Glenn 3/20 (4 overs)		Kathryn Bryce 53* (55); Ryana MacDonald-Gay 2/14 (4 overs)

Surrey won by 10 runs
Trent Bridge, Nottingham
Umpires: Gabi Brown and Neil Pratt

- Surrey won the toss and elected to bat.
- Points: Surrey 4, The Blaze 0

Match 45
11 July 2025
18:30 (D/N)
Scorecard

Birmingham Bears; 149/8 (20 overs)	v	Somerset; 127/9 (20 overs)
Sterre Kalis 51 (41); Mollie Robbins 4/29 (4 overs)		Amanda-Jade Wellington 33 (25); Hannah Baker 3/32 (4 overs)

Birmingham Bears won by 22 runs
County Ground, Taunton
Umpires: Anthony Harris and Julia Jarvis

- Birmingham Bears won the toss and elected to bat.
- Points: Birmingham Bears 4, Somerset 0

Match 46
13 July 2025
14:00
Scorecard

The Blaze; 139 (19.4 overs)	v	Essex
Heather Graham 33 (23); Eva Gray 4/18 (3.4 overs)

County Ground, Chelmsford
Umpires: Rose Fernando and Rob White

- The Blaze won the toss and elected to bat.

Match 47
13 July 2025
11:00
Scorecard

Birmingham Bears; 165/9 (20 overs)	v	Hampshire Hawks; 149/6 (20 overs)
Davina Perrin 70 (48); Bex Tyson 3/27 (4 overs)		Ellyse Perry 58 (44); Hannah Baker 3/18 (4 overs)

Birmingham Bears won by 16 runs
Rose Bowl, Southampton
Umpires: Grace Bambury and Anthony Harris

- Hampshire Hawks won the toss and elected to field.
- Points: Birmingham Bears 4, Hampshire Hawks 0

Match 48
13 July 2025
11:00
Scorecard

Lancashire Thunder; 148/7 (20 overs)	v	Durham; 149/8 (19.2 overs)
Emma Lamb 74 (48); Sophia Turner 3/27 (4 overs)		Bess Heath 43 (23); Alana King 3/24 (4 overs)

Durham won by 2 wickets
Old Trafford, Manchester
Umpires: Jasmine Naeem and Simon Widdup

- Durham won the toss and elected to field.
- Points: Durham 4, Lancashire Thunder 0

Match 49
13 July 2025
11:00
Scorecard

Surrey; 175/6 (20 overs)	v	Somerset; 107 (17.3 overs)
Alice Monaghan 57* (32); Chloe Skelton 2/20 (3 overs)		Amanda-Jade Wellington 21 (14); Danielle Gregory 4/13 (3.3 overs)

Surrey won by 68 runs
The Oval, London
Umpires: Gabi Brown and James Tredwell

- Somerset won the toss and elected to field.
- Points: Surrey 5, Somerset 0

Match 50
15 July 2025
14:30
Scorecard

Durham	v	Surrey

Match abandoned
Riverside Ground, Chester-le-Street

- No toss.
- No play was possible due to rain.
- Points: Durham 2, surrey 0

Match 51
16 July 2025
18:00 (D/N)
Scorecard

Essex; 107 (18.2 overs)	v	Lancashire Thunder; 108/6 (19.5 overs)
Alice Macleod 23 (19); Mahika Gaur 3/22 (4 overs)		Eve Jones 59 (58); Madeline Penna 2/11 (2 overs)

Lancashire Thunder won by 4 wickets
County Ground, Chelmsford
Umpires: Ben Debenham and Julia Jarvis

- Essex won the toss and elected to bat.
- Points: Lancashire Thunder 4, Essex 0

Match 52
16 July 2025
18:00 (D/N)
Scorecard

The Blaze; 138 (20 overs)	v	Somerset
Georgia Elwiss 35 (34); Olivia Barnes 3/12 (4 overs)

No result
County Ground, Taunton
Umpires: Ian Blackwell and Surendiran Shanmugam

- Somerset won the toss and elected to field.
- Points: The Blaze 2, Somerset 2

Match 53
18 July 2025
18:00 (D/N)
Scorecard

Essex; 164/3 (20 overs)	v	Durham; 155/8 (20 overs)
Cordelia Griffith 60 (35); Katie Levick 1/24 (4 overs)		Suzie Bates 45 (39); Madeline Penna 2/26 (4 overs); Sophia Smale 2/26 (4 overs); Abtaha Maqsood 2/26 (4 overs)

Essex won by 9 runs
County Ground, Chelmsford
Umpires: Gabi Brown and Neil Bainton

- Essex won the toss and elected to bat.
- Points: Essex 4, Durham 0

Match 54
18 July 2025
18:30 (D/N)
Scorecard

The Blaze; 164/5 (20 overs)	v	Hampshire; 137/4 (20 overs)
Marie Kelly 57 (45); Ellyse Perry 2/21 (3 overs)		Rhianna Southby 62 (51); Cassidy McCarthy 1/15 (4 overs)

The Blaze won by 27 runs
Rose Bowl, Southampton
Umpires: Rose Fernando and Surendiran Shanmugam

- Hampshire won the toss and elected field.
- Points: The Blaze 4, Hampshire 0

Match 55
18 July 2025
14:30
Scorecard

Somerset; 114/6 (17 overs)	v	Lancashire Thunder; 114/7 (17 overs)
Sophie Luff 36 (30); Mahika Gaur 3/15 (4 overs)		Seren Smale 25 (28); Amanda-Jade Wellington 3/24 (4 overs)

Match tied
Stanley Park, Blackpool
Umpires: Hassan Adnan and Jasmine Naeem

- Lancashire Thunder won the toss and elected to field.
- The match was reduced to 17 overs per side due to rain.
- Somerset 2, Lascashire Thunder 2

Match 56
18 July 2025
18:30 (D/N)
Scorecard

Surrey; 204/5 (20 overs)	v	Birmingham Bears; 179/9 (20 overs)
Kira Chathli 65 (31); Amu Surenkumar 3/33 (4 overs)		Laura Harris 42 (14); Priyanaz Chatterji 3/23 (4 overs)

Surrey won by 25 runs
The Oval, London
Umpires: Julia Jarvis and Simon Widdup

- Birmingham Bears won the toss and elected to field.
- Points: Surrey 4, Birmingham Bears 0

== League Two ==
=== North Group ===
==== June ====
Match 1
1 June 2025
11:00
Scorecard

Northants Steelbacks; 123/8 (20 overs)	v	Leicestershire Foxes; 115/5 (20 overs)
Gemma Marriott 28 (22); Francesca Sweet 3/10 (3 overs)		Francesca Sweet 37 (25); Lenny Sims 1/15 (4 overs)

Northants Steelbacks won by 8 runs
County Ground, Northampton
Umpires: Neil Bainton and Amy Coyne

- Northants Steelbacks won the toss and elected to bat.
- Points: Northants Steelbacks 4, Leicestershire Foxes 0

Match 2
1 June 2025
14:30
Scorecard

Derbyshire Falcons; 104/7 (20 overs)	v	Yorkshire; 105/2 (12.4 overs)
Adrianna Darlow 27* (34); Ria Fackrell 4/13 (4 overs)		Georgie Boyce 42 (25); Francesca Clarke 1/18 (2.4 overs)

Yorkshire won by 8 wickets
Headingley, Leeds
Umpires: Jane Pratt and Mohammed Waseem

- Derbyshire Falcons won the toss and elected to bat.
- Ponts: Yorkshire 5, Derbyshire Falcons 0

Match 3
8 June 2025
10:30
Scorecard

Worcestershire Rapids; 53 (13.2 overs)	v	Derbyshire Falcons; 57/3 (17.1 overs)
Bryony Gillgrass 14 (17); Rhiannon Knowling-Davies 3/2 (2 overs)		Megan Pittman 19 (29); Phoebe Brett 1/7 (4 overs)

Derbyshire Falcons won by 7 wickets
New Road, Worcester
Umpires: Ben Peverall and Tracey Murphy

- Derbyshire Falcons won the toss and elected to field.
- Points: Derbyshire Falcons 4, Worcestershire Rapids 0

Match 4
8 June 2025
14:30
Scorecard

Northants Steelbacks; 134/8 (20 overs)	v	Worcestershire Rapids; 119/7 (20 overs)
Michaela Kirk 27 (25); Flora Bertwistle 3/11 (4 overs)		Clare Boycott 48 (45); Amelia Kemp 3/29 (4 overs)

Northants Steelbacks won by 15 runs
New Road, Worcester
Umpires: Ben Peverall and Laura Spragg

- Worcestershire Rapids won the toss and elected to field.
- Points: Northants Steelbacks 4, Worcestershire Rapids 0

Match 5
8 June 2025
11:00
Scorecard

Yorkshire; 127 (19.5 overs)	v	Leicestershire Foxes; 101 (19.4 overs)
Georgie Boyce 46 (38); D'nica Roff 2/17 (3 overs)		Lucy Weston 25 (17); Claudie Cooper 2/17 (4 overs)

Yorkshire won by 26 runs
Headingley, Leeds
Umpires: Amy Coyne and Jane Pratt

- Leicestershire Foxes won the toss and elected to field.
- Points: Yorkshire 5, Leicestershire Foxes 0

Match 6
15 June 2025
12:00
Scorecard

Worcestershire Rapids; 120/7 (20 overs)	v	Leicestershire Foxes; 121/3 (18 overs)
Poppy Davies 20 (19); Lucy Weston 4/20 (4 overs)		Francesca Sweet 67* (53); Flora Bertwistle 2/27 (4 overs)

Leicestershire Foxes won by 7 wickets
Grace Road, Leicester
Umpires: Amy Clark and Mel Juniper

- Leicestershire Foxes won the toss and elected to field.
- Points: Leicestershire Foxes 4, Worcestershire Rapids 0

Match 7
15 June 2025
14:30
Scorecard

Derbyshire Falcons; 118/8 (20 overs)	v	Northants Steelbacks; 101/9 (20 overs)
Jessica Couser 31 (29); Mabel Reid 3/11 (3 overs)		Abby Butcher 47 (45); Maria Andrews 5/17 (4 overs)

Derbyshire Falcons won by 17 runs
County Ground, Northampton
Umpires: Amy Coyne and Tom Lungley

- Northants Steelbacks won the toss and elected to field.
- Points: Derbyshire Falcons 4, Northants Steelbacks 0

Match 8
21 June 2025
14:30
Scorecard

Yorkshire; 163/5 (20 overs)	v	Derbyshire Falcons; 104 (16 overs)
Ami Campbell 43* (20); Adrianna Darlow 2/29 (4 overs)		Jessica Couser 42 (26); Claudie Cooper 2/15 (3 overs)

Yorkshire won by 59 runs
County Ground, Derby
Umpires: Grace Bambury and Kylie White

- Yorkshire Vikings won the toss and elected to bat.
- Points: Yorkshire 5, Derbyshire Falcons 0

Match 9
27 June 2025
17:30 (D/N)
Scorecard

Leicestershire Foxes; 153/6 (20 overs)	v	Northants Steelbacks; 85 (17.3 overs)
Francesca Sweet 35 (38); Amelia Kemp 2/19 (4 overs)		Amelia Kemp 23 (23); Lucy Higham 3/17 (4 overs0

Leicestershire Foxes won by 68 runs
Grace Road, Leicester
Umpires: Dean Daniels and Pam Orton

- Leicestershire Foxes won the toss and elected to bat.
- Points: Leicestershire Foxes 5, Northants Steelbacks 0

Match 10
27 June 2025
14:30
Scorecard

Worcestershire Rapids; 104/8 (20 overs)	v	Yorkshire; 105/3 (15.1 overs)
Clare Boycott 35 (40); Rachel Slater 2/16 (4 overs)		Lauren Winfield-Hill 33 (25); Flora Bertwistle 1/14 (4 overs)

Yorkshire won by 7 wickets
Headingley, Leeds
Umpires: Eloise Porter and Simon Widdup

- Worcestershire Rapids won the toss and elected to bat.
- Points: Yorkshire 4, Worcestershire Rapids 0

Match 11
28 June 2025
14:30
Scorecard

Worcestershire Rapids; 187/6 (20 overs)	v	Derbyshire Falcons; 158 (19.1 overs)
Ruby Davis 69 (46); Maria Andrews 2/35 (4 overs)		Jessica Couser 65 (42); Bryony Gillgrass 5/19 (4 overs)

Worcestershire Rapids won by 29 runs
Queen's Park, Chesterfield
Umpires: Amy Clark and Adam Hitchcock

- Derbyshire Falcons won the toss and elected to field.
- Points: Worcestershire Rapids 4, Derbyshire Falcons 0

Match 12
29 June 2025
14:30
Scorecard

Northants Steelbacks; 150/9 (20 overs)	v	Yorkshire; 151/5 (18 overs)
Michaela Kirk 35 (28); Ria Fackrell 4/17 (4 overs)		Maddie Ward 34 (30); Ella Phillips 4/34 (4 overs)

Yorkshire won by 5 wickets
Town Ground, Peterborough
Umpires: Wendy Crabtree and Hemal Wijesuriya

- Northants Steelbacks won the toss and elected to bat.
- Points: Yorkshire 4, Northants Steelbacks 0

==== July ====
Match 13
6 July 2025
14:30
Scorecard

Derbyshire Falcons; 117/8 (20 overs)	v	Leicestershire Foxes; 119/7 (19.4 overs)
Ella Porter 38* (51); Emma Thatcher 2/16 (4 overs)		Lucy Higham 36* (30); Rhiannon Knowling-Davies 3/18 (4 overs)

Leicestershire Foxes won by 3 wickets
Grace Road, Leicester
Umpires: Jane Pratt and Kate Marshall

- Derbyshire Falcons won the toss and elected to bat.
- Points: Leicestershire Foxes 4, Derbyshire Falcons 0

Match 14
6 July 2025
11:00
Scorecard

Northants Steelbacks	v	Worcestershire Rapids

Match abandoned
County Ground, Northampton

- No toss.
- No play was possible due to rain.
- Points: Northants Steelbacks 2, Worcestershire Rapids 2

Match 15
13 July 2025
10:30
Scorecard

Leicestershire Foxes; 55 (13.5 overs)	v	Worcestershire Rapids; 56/1 (10.5 overs)
Ellen Watson 14 (14); Clare Boycott 4/9 (4 overs)		Clare Boycott 30 (35); Lucy Weston 1/10 (2 overs)

Worcestershire Rapids won by 9 wickets
New Road, Worcester
Umpires: Kelly Alcock and Mel Juniper

- Worcestershire Rapids won the toss and elected to field.
- Points: Worcestershire Rapids 5, Leicestershire Foxes 0

Match 16
13 July 2025
11:00
Scorecard

Yorkshire; 167/4 (20 overs)	v	Northants Steelbacks; 114/4 (20 overs)
Georgie Boyce 55 (50); Lenny Sims 1/22 (4 overs)		Gemma Marriott 41 (46); Ria Fackrell 2/19 (4 overs)

Yorkshire won ny 53 runs
Headingley, Leeds
Umpires: Amy Clark and Jane Pratt

- Yorkshire won the toss and elected to bat.
- Points: Yorkshire 5, Northants Steelbacks 0

Match 17
18 July 2025
14:30
Scorecard

Derbyshire Falcons; 132/7 (20 overs)	v	Northants Steelbacks; 133/5 (19.3 overs)
Ella Porter 34 (25); Anisha Patel 3/19 (4 overs)		Gemma Marriott 54 (56); Francesca Clarke 2/24 (4 overs)

Northants Steelbacks won by 5 wickets
County Ground, Derby
Umpires: Amy Coyne and Laura Spragg

- Derbyshire Falcons won the toss and elected to bat.
- Points: Northants Steelbacks 4, Derbyshire Falcons 0

Match 18
18 July 2025
14:30
Scorecard

Yorkshire; 142/6 (20 overs)	v	Leicestershire Foxes; 130/8 (20 overs)
Georgie Boyce 47 (38); Emma Thatcher 3/27 (4 overs)		Francesca Sweet 48 (35); Rachel Slater 2/23 (4 overs); Claudie Cooper 2/23 (4 overs)

Yorkshire won by 12 runs
Grace Road, Leicester
Umpires: Pam Orton and Mohammed Waseem

- Yorkshire won the toss and elected bat.
- Points: Yorkshire 4, Leicestershire Foxes 0

Match 19
20 July 2025
14:30
Scorecard

Leicestershire Foxes; 125/5 (20 overs)	v	Derbyshire Falcons; 109/8 (20 overs)
Lucy Weston 50* (36); Maria Andrews 1/17 (4 overs)		Ella Porter 41 (54); Ellie Phillips 3/29 (4 overs)

Leicestershire Foxes won by 16 runs
Repton School Ground, Repton
Umpires: Kirstie Blackham and Adam Hitchcock

- Derbyshire Falcons won the toss and elected to field.
- Points: Leicestershire Foxes 4, Derbyshire Falcons 0

Match 20
20 July 2025
14:30
Scorecard

Worcestershire Rapids; 109 (20 overs)	v	Yorkshire; 93/4 (12.5 overs)
Ruby Davis 29 (34); Olivia Thomas 2/10 (3 overs)		Erin Thomas 35 (27); Bryony Gillgrass 2/16 (2.5 overs)

Yorkshire won by 6 wickets (DLS method)
New Road, Worcester
Umpires: Rehma Chandaria and Lizzie Condor

- Yorkshire won the toss and elected to field.
- Yorkshire were set a revised target of 93 runs from 16 overs due to rain.
- Points: Yorkshire 4, Worcestershire Rapids 0

=== South Group ===
==== May ====
Match 1
29 May 2025
14:15
Scorecard

Sussex Sharks; 102/7 (20 overs)	v	Middlesex; 103/2 (15.2 overs)
Izzy Collis 29 (27); Anaya Patel 4/18 (4 overs)		Riva Pindoria 50* (48); Talitha Stanley 1/11 (2 overs)

Middlesex won by 8 wickets
Lord's, London
Umpires: Rehma Chandaria and Julia Jarvis

- Middlesex won the toss and elected to field.
- Points: Middlesex 5, Sussex 0

==== June ====
Match 2
1 June 2025
12:00
Scorecard

Glamorgan; 77 (17.2 overs)	v	Middlesex; 79/6 (19.5 overs)
Niamh Holland 40 (39); Sonali Patel 2/9 (4 overs)		Saskia Horley 21* (28); Gemma Porter 3/7 (4 overs)

Middlesex won by 4 wickets
Merchant Taylors' Ground, Northwood
Umpires: Anna Harris and Mel Juniper

- Middlesex won the toss and elected to field.
- Points: Middlesex 4, Glamorgan 0

Match 3
1 June 2025
12:00
Scorecard

Sussex Sharks; 148/2 (20 overs)	v	Gloucestershire; 121/4 (20 overs)
Rachel King 68* (54); Caitlin Belcher 1/15 (2 overs)		Jess Hazell 36* (42); Chiara Green 2/19 (4 overs)

Sussex Sharks won by 27 runs
County Ground, Hove
Umpires: Julia Jarvis and Dean Daniels

- Gloucestershire won the toss and elected to field.
- Points: Sussex Sharks 4, Gloucestershire 0

Match 4
8 June 2025
14:30
Scorecard

Middlesex; 140/8 (20 overs)	v	Kent Spitfires; 122/6 (20 overs)
Saskia Horley 63 (45); Alice Grant 3/21 (4 overs)		Tilly Callaghan 44 (44); Lauren Turner 2/21 (3 overs)

Middlesex won by 18 runs
Brunton Memorial Ground, Radlett
Umpires: Sharon Grigg and Hemal Wijesuriya

- Kent Spitfires won the toss and elected to field.
- Points: Middlesex 4, Kent 0

Match 5
8 June 2025
12:00
Scorecard

Glamorgan; 133/8 (20 overs)	v	Sussex Sharks; 128/9 (20 overs)
Bethan Gammon 42 (24); Anna Buckle 2/19 (3 overs)		Bethan Gammon 42 (24); Anna Buckle 2/19 (3 overs)

Glamorgan won by 5 runs
County Ground, Hove
Umpires: Kelly Alcock and Dean Daniels

- Glamorgan won the toss and elected to bat.
- Points: Glamorgan 4, Sussex Sharks 0

Match 6
15 June 2025
12:00
Scorecard

Kent Spitfires; 182/5 (20 overs)	v	Gloucestershire; 147/6 (20 overs)
Amy Gordon 55 (32); Melissa Story 1/14 (3 overs)		Bea Willis 56* (59); Zeena Bilal 2/21 (4 overs)

Kent Spitfires won by 35 runs
County Ground, Bristol
Umpires: Gabi Brown and Rehma Chandaria

- Gloucestershire won the toss and elected to field.
- Points: Kent Spitfires 4, Gloucestershire 0

Match 7
15 June 2025
12:00
Scorecard

Glamorgan; 171/4 (20 overs)	v	Middlesex; 141/9 (20 overs)
Lauren Parfitt 75 (60); Sarah Pearson 2/35 (4 overs)		Saskia Horley 46 (36); Poppy Tulloch 3/18 (4 overs)

Glamorgan won by 30 runs
Penrhyn Avenue, Colwyn Bay
Umpires: Grace Bambury and Anna Harris

- Glamorgan won the toss and elected to bat.
- Point: Glamorgan 4, Middlesex 0

Match 8
22 June 2025
14:30
Scorecard

Middlesex; 201/1 (20 overs0	v	Gloucestershire; 161 (19.3 overs)
Finty Trussler 90 (59)		Melissa Story 45 (30); Anisha Dissanyake 2/23 (3 overs)

Middlesex won by 40 runs
Brunton Memorial Ground, Radlett
Umpires: Anna Harris and Mel Juniper

- Middlesex won the toss and elected to bat.
- Points: Middlesex 5, Gloucestershire 0

Match 9
22 June 2025
15:00
Scorecard

Kent Spitfires; 95/9 (20 overs)	v	Sussex Sharks; 98/3 (10.3 overs)
Coco Streets 23 (23); Jasmine Westley 3/12 (3 overs)		Rachel King 50 (28); Megan Belt 2/22 (2 overs)

Sussex won by 7 wickets
County Ground, Hove
Umpires: Julia Jarvis and Hemal Wijesuriya

- Kent won the toss and elected to bat.
- Points: Sussex 5, Kent 0

Match 10
27 June 2025
14:30
Scorecard

Gloucestershire; 123/9 (20 overs)	v	Kent Spitfires; 91 (17.5 overs)
Prarthana Reddy 45 (40); Zeena Bilal 2/16 (3 overs)		Isobel Kirby 14 (19); Liv Daniels 3/19 (3 overs)

Gloucestershire won by 32 runs
St Lawrence Ground, Canterbury
Umpires: Ben Debenham and Hemal Wijesuriya

- Gloucestershire won the toss and elected to bat.
- Points: Gloucestershire 4, Kent Spitfires 0

Match 11
27 June 2025
14:30
Scorecard

Glamorgan; 145/5 (20 overs)	v	Sussex Sharks; 118/8 (20 overs)
Daisy Mullan 63* (65); Eve O'Neill 2/17 (4 overs)		Rachel King 35 (28); Nicole Reid 3/12 (4 overs)

Glamorgan won by 30 runs
Spytty Park, Newport, Wales
Umpires: Darren Turl and Kylie White

- Glamorgan won the toss and elected to bat.
- Points: Glamorgan 4, Sussex Sharks 0

Match 12
29 June 2025
14:30
Scorecard

Gloucestershire; 114/8 (20 overs)	v	Glamorgan; 115/4 (16.3 overs)
Prathana Reddy 39 (51); Poppy Tulloch 3/22 (3 overs)		Bea Ellis 25 (33); Alice Bird 2/17 (3 overs)

Glamorgan won by 6 wickets
County Ground, Bristol
Umpires: Neil Bainton and Rehma Chandaria

- Gloucestershire won the toss and elected to bat.
- Points: Glamorgan 4, Gloucestershire 0

==== July ====
Match 13
5 July 2025
13:00
Scorecard

Middlesex; 167/5 (20 overs)	v	Sussex Sharks; 152/7 (20 overs)
Saskia Horley 42 (29); Ava Lee 2/22 (3 overs)		Nancy Harman 77* (53); Saskia Horley 2/24 (4 overs)

Middlesex won by 15 runs
County Ground, Hove
Umpires: Neil Bainton and Amy Coyne

- Middlesex won the toss and elected to bat.
- Points: Middlesex 4, Sussex Sharks 0

Match 14
6 July 2025
14:30
Scorecard

Kent Spitfires	v	Glamorgan

No result
St Lawrence Ground, Canterbury
Umpires: Hemal Wijesuriya and Amanda Wixon

- No toss.
- No play was possible due to rain.
- Points: Kent 2, Glamorgan 2

Match 15
13 July 2025
11:00
Scorecard

Gloucestershire; 114/5 (20 overs)	v	Glamorgan; 117/1 (13.4 overs)
Bea Willis 28 (30); Anna-Mae Shearn 2/27 (4 overs)		Bea Ellis 67* (55); Charlotte Phillips 1/17 (4 overs)

Glamorgan won by 9 wickets
Sophia Gardens, Cardiff
Umpires: Dean Daniels and Stephen Fildes

- Gloucestershire won the toss and elected to bat.
- Points: Glamorgan 5, Gloucestershire 0

Match 16
13 July 2025
11:00
Scorecard

Middlesex; 163/7 (20 overs)	v	Kent Spitfires; 122/8 (20 overs)
Gayatri Gole 61 (37); Ella Darlington 1/18 (3 overs)		Grace Poole 39 (42); Saskia Horley 2/28 (4 overs)

Middlesex won by 41 runs
St Lawrence Ground, Canterbury
Umpires: Rehma Chandaria and Kylie White

- Kent Spitfires won the toss and elected to bat.
- Points: Middlesex 5, Kent 0

Match 17
17 July 2025
12:00
Scorecard

Sussex Sharks; 187/6 (20 overs)	v	Gloucestershire; 122 (19 overs)
Rachel King 48 (23); Liv Daniels 2/23 (4 overs)		Meg Ahearne 31* (26); Talitha Stanley 3/28 (4 overs)

Sussex won by 65 runs
College Ground, Cheltenham
Umpires: Dean Daniels and Kylie White

- Sussex Sharks won the toss and elected to bat.
- Points: Sussex 5, Gloucestershire 0

Match 18
18 July 2025
14:30
Scorecard

Glamorgan; 132/5 (20 overs)	v	Kent Spitfires; 133/4 (20 overs)
Bethan Gammon 69* (53); Isabella James 1/18 (4 overs)		Coco Streets 41* (31); Poppy Tulloch 2/24 (3 overs)

Kent Spitfires won by 6 wickets
Sophia Gardens, Cardiff
Umpires: Dean Daniels and Kylie white

- Kent Spitfires won the toss and elected to field.
- Points: Kent Spitfires 4, Glamorgan 0

Match 19
20 July 2025
14:30
Scorecard

Middlesex; 147/5 (20 overs)	v	Gloucestershire; 146/6 (20 overs)
Saskia Horley 45 (27); Alice Hill 2/26 (4 overs)		Georgie Cant 51 (34); Rachana Cambampaty 1/17 (4 overs)

Middlesex won by 1 run
College Ground, Cheltenham
Umpires: Sharon Grigg and Melissa Juniper

- Middlesex won the toss and elected to bat.
- Points: Middlesex 4, Gloucestershire 0

Match 20
20 July 2025
14:30
Scorecard

Sussex Sharks; 75/4 (10 overs)	v	Kent Spitfires; 65/6 (10 overs)
Isabelle Collis 30 (26); Isabella James 2/7 (2 overs)		Megan Sturge 21 (18); Jasmine Westley 2/10 (2 overs)

Sussex Sharks won by 10 runs
St Lawrence Ground, Canterbury
Umpires: Julia Jarvis and Hemal Wijesuriya

- Kent Spitfires won the toss and elected to field.
- The match was reduced to 10 overs per side due to rain.
- Points: Sussex Sharks 4, Kent Spitfires 0

== Finals Day ==
=== League Two ===
Semi-final 1
26 July 2025
11:00
Scorecard

Leicestershire Foxes; 140/7 (20 overs)	v	Middlesex; 109/0 (10.4 overs)
Scarlett Hughes 47 (37); Hannah Davis 3/17 (4 overs)		Finty Trussler 52* (30)

Middlesex won by 10 wickets (DLS method)
County Ground, Northampton
Umpires: Amy Coyne and Julia Jarvis

- Middlesex won the toss and elected to field.
- Middlesex were set a revised target of 108 runs from 14 overs due to rain.

Semi-final 2
26 July 2025
14:30
Scorecard

Glamorgan; 124/9 (20 overs)	v	Yorkshire; 130/3 (17.3 overs)
Bethan Ellis 41 (38); Olivia Thomas 3/29 (4 overs)		Georgie Boyce 38 (37); Poppy Tulloch 2/29 (3 overs)

Yorkshire won by 7 wickets
County Ground, Northampton
Umpires: Amy Coyne and Jane Pratt

- Glamorgan won the toss and elected to bat.

Final
26 July 2025
18:45 (N)
Scorecard

Yorkshire; 101/9 (20 overs)	v	Middlesex; 103/0 (13.1 overs)
Maddie Ward 39 (35); Rachana Cambampaty 3/30 (4 overs)		Finty Trussler 52* (45)

Middlesex won by 10 wickets
County Ground, Northampton
Umpires: Julia Jarvis and Jane Pratt
Player of the match: Isabella Routledge (Middlesex)

- Yorkshire won the toss and elected to bat.

=== League One ===
The group stage winners progress directly to the final, while the 2nd and 3rd-place finishers compete in the semi-final.

Eliminator
27 July 2025
12:30
Scorecard

Birmingham Bears; 163/8 (20 overs)	v	The Blaze; 143 (19.1 overs)
Issy Wong 59 (38); Sarah Glenn 3/29 (4 overs)		Georgia Elwiss 53 (45); Issy Wong 4/14 (3.1 overs)

Birmingham Bears won by 20 runs
The Oval, London
Umpires: Gabi Brown and Jack Shantry
Player of the match: Issy Wong (Birmingham Bears)

- Birmingham Bears won the toss and elected to bat.

Final
27 July 2025
16:30
Scorecard

Birmingham Bears; 153/9 (20 overs)	v	Surrey; 154/5 (16.4 overs)
Issy Wong 31 (19); Phoebe Franklin 2/16 (4 overs)		Grace Harris 63* (33); Amuruthaa Surenkumar 2/13 (2 overs)

Surrey won by 5 wickets
The Oval, London
Umpires: Rose Fernando and Jack Shantry
Player of the match: Grace Harris (Surrey)

- Surrey won the toss and elected to field.
