= Yvonne Dolphin-Cooper =

English umpire (born 1956)

Personal information
- Born: 4 August 1956 (age 70); Coventry, West Midlands, England
- Role: Umpire

Umpiring information
- Source: Cricinfo, 20 September 2021

Yvonne Dolphin-Cooper (born 4 August 1956) is an English cricket umpire.

== Career ==
Dolphin-Cooper began umpiring in domestic women's cricket in 2012, and has officiated in the Women's Twenty20 Cup, the Women's County Championship, the Rachael Heyhoe Flint Trophy and the Charlotte Edwards Cup.

She has also umpired in the West of England Premier League and in visually impaired cricket matches.

In May 2021, Dolphin-Cooper, alongside Anna Harris, became the first-all female umpiring duo ever in ECB Premier League history when they officiated together in a West of England Premier League match between Downend CC and Bedminster in Gloucestershire.
