= Anna Harris =

English cricket umpire and cricketer (born 1998)

Personal information
- Full name: Anna Yolanda Harris
- Born: 15 October 1998 (age 28); High Wycombe, Buckinghamshire, England
- Batting: Right-handed
- Bowling: Right-arm leg break
- Role: Bowler

Domestic team information
- Years: Team
- 2012–2014: Buckinghamshire
- 2015–2017: Berkshire
- 2018–2020: Buckinghamshire
- 2021: Wales

Umpiring information
- T20Is umpired: 8 (2024)
- WTests umpired: 2 (2022–2023)
- WODIs umpired: 24 (2021–2025)
- WT20Is umpired: 29 (2023–2025)
- FC umpired: 1 (2025)
- LA umpired: 12 (2022–2024)
- Source: CricketArchive, 22 June 2023

Dr Anna Yolanda Harris (born 15 October 1998) is an English cricket umpire and cricketer.

Harris began umpiring top-level cricket in 2020, and umpired her first international match in 2021. She has also played domestic cricket for Wales, Buckinghamshire and Berkshire.

== Personal life ==
In 2025, Harris was awarded a Medical Degree from Cardiff University. Throughout her time at medical school, she served as a healthcare support worker, including treating patients diagnosed with COVID-19.

== Career ==
She pursued her interest in the sport of cricket from when she was just five years old. She was inspired to take up the sport by one of her teachers who brought cricket kit out in order to entertain the students during a rainy day at her primary school. She soon urged her mother Yolanda to sign her up in order to play for a local club. She was later encouraged to pursue an umpiring course by her mother, who was also an umpire by profession.

In May 2021, she, alongside Yvonne Dolphin-Cooper, created history by becoming the first-all female umpiring duo ever in ECB Premier League history when they officiated together in a West of England Premier League match between Downend CC and Bedminster in Gloucestershire.

She officiated as one of the umpires in the inaugural edition of the Rachael Heyhoe Flint Trophy in 2020. She was also chosen to officiate in the 2021 Rachael Heyhoe Flint Trophy. She has also served as an umpire in the South Wales Premier League, the Thames Valley League, and completed a season in Melbourne. She also officiated in few matches of the inaugural edition of The Hundred in 2021.

She became the youngest ever umpire to officiate in an international cricket match at the age of 22 during the bilateral women's ODI series between England and New Zealand in September 2021.

She umpired with Rob White in a men's 50-over match, Kent v Leicestershire, on Sunday 6 August 2023.

In September 2024 she was named as part of an all-female officiating group for the 2024 ICC Women's T20 World Cup.

== See also ==
- List of Twenty20 International cricket umpires
