= Charlotte Edwards Cup =

Women's cricket tournament

- Countries: England and Wales
- Administrator: ECB
- Format: Twenty20
- First edition: 2021
- Latest edition: 2024
- Tournament format: Group stage and knockout
- Number of teams: 8
- Current champion: The Blaze (1st title)
- Most successful: Southern Vipers (2 titles)

The Charlotte Edwards Cup, initially named the Women's Regional T20, was an English and Welsh women's cricket Twenty20 domestic competition, held annually from 2021 to 2024. The tournament was named after England's former captain and most capped player, Charlotte Edwards. It featured eight teams, each representing a region that comprised multiple counties. The Cup was organised by the England and Wales Cricket Board.

The tournament replaced the Women's Cricket Super League, which ended in 2019. A regional T20 tournament was planned for 2020 but was cancelled in favour of the 50-over Rachael Heyhoe Flint Trophy in the shortened 2020 season, due to the COVID-19 pandemic. From 2021, the Charlotte Edwards Cup ran alongside the Rachael Heyhoe Flint Trophy and The Hundred. In 2024, the Charlotte Edwards Cup had its last edition, and it was replaced in 2025 by the Women's T20 Blast.

== History ==
With the ending of the Women's Cricket Super League in 2019, the England and Wales Cricket Board intended to launch a new regional structure for domestic women's cricket in England and Wales, including a 50-over competition, a Twenty20 competition and The Hundred. However, as the COVID-19 pandemic shortened the 2020 season, only the 50-over Rachael Heyhoe Flint Trophy was able to go ahead that season, with six new teams competing, plus Western Storm and Southern Vipers carried over from the WCSL, representing regional hubs.

In 2021, with a return to a full schedule, it was announced in February that the new Twenty20 competition would be called the Women's Regional T20, to run alongside the Rachael Heyhoe Flint Trophy and to be competed for by the same teams. Two days before the tournament began, it was renamed the Charlotte Edwards Cup, with the first edition of the tournament getting underway on 26 June, eventually being won by South East Stars.

The second edition of the tournament (2022) was won by Southern Vipers, who beat Central Sparks in the final. Vipers retained their title in 2023, beating The Blaze in the final by 7 wickets. The Blaze won the title the following year, defeating South East Stars in the final after topping the group stage.

2024's was the last edition of the competition as the ECB announced it would be replaced, due to another restructuring of women's domestic cricket in England and Wales. The ECB reversed the regionalised structure of the Charlotte Edwards Cup, and has replaced it with a new Women's T20 Blast using the county structure.

== Teams ==
Primary home ground of each team

The teams for the Charlotte Edwards Cup are as follows:

Team	County partners	Home grounds (2023)	Captain
Central Sparks	Herefordshire; Shropshire; Staffordshire; Warwickshire; Worcestershire	Edgbaston, Birmingham; New Road, Worcester	Evelyn Jones
Northern Diamonds	Durham; Northumberland; Yorkshire	Headingley Cricket Ground, Leeds; Riverside Ground, Chester-le-Street	Hollie Armitage
North West Thunder	Cheshire; Cumbria; Lancashire	Old Trafford, Manchester; Stanley Park, Blackpool	Eleanor Threlkeld
South East Stars	Kent; Surrey	County Ground, Beckenham; The Oval, London; St Lawrence Ground, Canterbury	Bryony Smith
Southern Vipers	Berkshire; Buckinghamshire; Dorset; Hampshire; Oxfordshire; Sussex; Isle of Wight Cricket Board	County Ground, Hove; Rose Bowl, Southampton; Falkland Cricket Club, Newbury	Georgia Adams
Sunrisers	Bedfordshire; Cambridgeshire; Essex; Hertfordshire; Huntingdonshire; Middlesex; Norfolk; Northamptonshire; Suffolk; Marylebone Cricket Club	County Cricket Ground, Chelmsford; County Ground, Northampton; Lord's, London	Grace Scrivens
The Blaze	Derbyshire; Leicestershire; Lincolnshire; Nottinghamshire; Loughborough University	Grace Road, Leicester; County Ground, Derby; Trent Bridge, Nottingham	Kirstie Gordon
Western Storm	Cornwall; Devon; Glamorgan; Gloucestershire; Somerset; Wiltshire; Cricket Wales	Bristol County Ground, Bristol; County Ground, Taunton; Sophia Gardens, Cardiff	Sophie Luff

== Competition format ==
In 2021 and 2022, teams played each other home and away in their group. The two group winners and the best second-place team advanced to Finals Day. The best group winner advanced straight to the final, whilst the other two teams played off in a semi-final. In 2023, teams played in one group of eight, playing each other team in the group once, with the top team in the group advancing directly to the final, whilst the second and third-placed teams play off in the semi-final. The tournament expanded again ahead of the 2024 season, with teams playing ten group stage matches and four teams qualifying for Finals Day, with two semi-finals and a final.

Teams receive 4 points for a win. A bonus point is given where the winning team's run rate is 1.25 or greater times that of the opposition. In case of a tie in the standings, the following tiebreakers are applied in order: highest net run rate, team that scored the most points in matches involving the tied parties, better bowling strike rate, drawing of lots.

== Tournament results ==
List of Charlotte Edwards Cup winners
Season	Winner	Runners-up	Final Venue	Player (club)	Runs	Player (club)	Wickets	Notes
Season	Winner	Runners-up	Final Venue	Leading run-scorer		Leading wicket-taker		Notes
2021	South East Stars	Northern Diamonds	Rose Bowl, Southampton	Evelyn Jones (Central Sparks)	276	Bryony Smith (South East Stars)	14	
2022	Southern Vipers	Central Sparks	County Ground, Northampton	Amy Jones (Central Sparks)	289	Katie Levick (Northern Diamonds)	15	
2023	Southern Vipers	The Blaze	New Road, Worcester	Danni Wyatt (Southern Vipers)	273	Nadine de Klerk (The Blaze)	15	
2024	The Blaze	South East Stars	County Ground, Derby	Kathryn Bryce (The Blaze)	478	Kirstie Gordon (The Blaze)	22	
