= Women's T20 Blast =

English professional women's twenty20 cricket league

T20 Blast Women
- Countries: England
- Administrator: England and Wales Cricket Board
- Format: Women's Twenty20
- First edition: 2025
- Latest edition: 2026
- Next edition: 2027
- Number of teams: League One: 8 (9 from 2026); League Two: 10 (9 from 2026)
- Current champion: League One: The Blaze; League Two: Glamorgan (1st title)
- Most successful: League One: Surrey, The Blaze (1 title each); League Two: Glamorgan, Middlesex (1 title each)

The T20 Blast Women, officially known as the Vitality Blast Women for sponsorship reasons, is a professional women's Twenty20 county cricket competition in England and Wales, run by the England and Wales Cricket Board (ECB). Launched in 2025, it serves as the successor to the Charlotte Edwards Cup.

== Format ==
The tournament is split into two categories: one contested by the eight counties in League 1, and the second featuring the 10 remaining counties in League 2.

=== Teams ===
Eight teams from League 1 are competing in the inaugural 2025 season: the Birmingham Bears, Durham, Essex, Hampshire, the Lancashire Thunder, Somerset, Surrey, and The Blaze (Nottinghamshire). Yorkshire will be awarded tier-one status and join the league in 2026, then Glamorgan in 2027, while further two teams will be awarded tier-one status in 2029.

The remaining ten teams compete in League 2, in which each county plays eight group-stage matches (home-and-away) against the other four counties in their group. The teams are divided into the following groups.

North group	South group
Derbyshire Falcons; Leicestershire Foxes; Northants Steelbacks; Worcestershire Rapids; Yorkshire	Glamorgan; Gloucestershire; Kent Spitfires; Middlesex; Sussex Sharks

=== Divisions ===
League One	League Two	
League One	North group	South group
Birmingham Bears; Durham; Essex; Hampshire; Lancashire Thunder; Somerset; Surrey; The Blaze	Derbyshire Falcons; Leicestershire Foxes; Northants Steelbacks; Worcestershire Rapids; Yorkshire Vikings	Glamorgan; Gloucestershire; Kent Spitfires; Middlesex; Sussex Sharks

== Winners ==
=== League One ===
Season	Winner	Winning Margin	Runner-up	Venue	City	Source
2025	Surrey	Won by 5 wickets	Birmingham Bears	The Oval	London	Scorecard
2026	The Blaze	Won by 10 wickets	Durham	The Oval	London	Scorecard

=== League Two ===
Season	Winner	Winning Margin	Runner-up	Venue	City	Source
2025	Middlesex	Won by 10 wickets	Yorkshire	County Ground	Northampton	Scorecard
2026	Glamorgan	Won by 32 runs	Gloucestershire	Sophia Gardens	Cardiff	Scorecard

== See also ==
- T20 Blast (men's competition)
- Women's T20 County Cup
