= Katie Wolfe (cricketer) =

English cricketer

Personal information
- Full name: Katie Jae Wolfe
- Born: 30 April 2001 (age 25); Watford, Hertfordshire, England
- Batting: Right-handed
- Bowling: Right-arm medium
- Role: Bowler

Domestic team information
- Years: Team
- 2017–2021: Middlesex
- 2020–2021: Sunrisers
- 2022–present: Derbyshire

Career statistics
Competition	WLA	WT20
Matches	18	36
Runs scored	48	16
Batting average	6.00	4.00
100s/50s	0/0	0/0
Top score	19	7
Balls bowled	727	563
Wickets	22	26
Bowling average	23.40	21.23
5 wickets in innings	0	0
10 wickets in match	0	0
Best bowling	3/12	3/16
Catches/stumpings	9/–	9/–
- Source: CricketArchive, 8 October 2022

Katie Jae Wolfe (born 30 April 2001) is an English cricketer who currently plays for Derbyshire. She plays as a right-arm medium bowler. She previously played for Middlesex and Sunrisers.

== Early life ==
Wolfe was born on 30 April 2001 in Watford, Hertfordshire.

== Domestic career ==
Wolfe made her county debut in 2017, for Middlesex against Sussex, in which she took 1/8 from three overs. She was part of the Middlesex side that won the Twenty20 Cup in 2018. In 2019, Wolfe was Middlesex's leading wicket-taker in both the County Championship and the Twenty20 Cup, and achieved her best bowling figures in both formats, taking 3/12 in a List A match against Berkshire and 3/16 in a Twenty20 against Sussex. She took three wickets in eight matches for the side in the 2021 Women's Twenty20 Cup. Wolfe joined Derbyshire for the 2022 season. She took five wickets in eight matches for the side in the 2022 Women's Twenty20 Cup.

In 2020, Wolfe played for Sunrisers in the Rachael Heyhoe Flint Trophy. She appeared in all six matches, taking 7 wickets, the joint most for the side, at an average of 30.42. She played one match for the side in 2021, against Western Storm in the Charlotte Edwards Cup, taking 1/23 from 3 overs.
