= Rachael Heyhoe Flint Trophy =

Women's cricket tournament

- Countries: England and Wales
- Administrator: ECB
- Format: 50-over cricket
- First edition: 2020
- Latest edition: 2024
- Tournament format: Group stage and knockout
- Number of teams: 8
- Current champion: Sunrisers (1st title)
- Most successful: Southern Vipers (3 titles)
- TV: Sky Sports

The Rachael Heyhoe Flint Trophy was an English and Welsh women's cricket domestic competition, named after former England captain Rachael Heyhoe Flint, who died in 2017. The Trophy was held from 2020 to 2024, and was the premier women's 50-over cricket competition in England and Wales. Eight teams took part, each representing a region; these regions comprised multiple counties. The competition used a group or round-robin format, with an annual final match that decided the champions.

Initially started as a one-off tournament to replace the Women's County Championship, the Rachael Heyhoe Flint Trophy began in August 2020. In the first edition, the Southern Vipers beat the Northern Diamonds in the final. In 2021 the competition returned as a permanent part of the women's domestic cricket structure, alongside the Charlotte Edwards Cup. The final Rachael Heyhoe Flint Trophy was played in 2024, won by Sunrisers. The England and Wales Cricket Board (ECB) replaced it with a new Women's One-Day Cup, as part of a restructuring of women's domestic cricket in England and Wales.

== History ==
In 2018, the England and Wales Cricket Board (ECB) announced the launch of The Hundred in 2020, which would supersede the existing premier women's T20 cricket tournament, the Women's Cricket Super League. To accompany The Hundred, the ECB announced a plan to launch a new 'regional elite domestic structure for women's cricket', which would include the awarding of 40 new full-time professional contracts for non-England players.

These plans were put on hold due to the COVID-19 pandemic, but the Rachael Heyhoe Flint Trophy was eventually scheduled to begin in August 2020, with six new teams competing, alongside two teams carried over from the WCSL, Western Storm and Southern Vipers. The trophy was named after former England player Rachael Heyhoe Flint, and was intended to be a one-off, in light of the pandemic.

Southern Vipers were the inaugural champions of the tournament, beating Northern Diamonds in the final.

In February 2021, the ECB announced that the Rachael Heyhoe Flint Trophy would continue for the following season, with a slightly altered format (also, a new regional T20 competition, the Charlotte Edwards Cup, was contested by the same eight teams). In the 2021 Rachael Heyhoe Flint Trophy, Southern Vipers and Northern Diamonds again reached the final, and Southern Vipers were again victorious, claiming their second title. In 2022, the Vipers and Diamonds once again reached the final, but this time the Northern Diamonds won by two runs, claiming their first title.

Ahead of the 2023 season, it was announced that the tournament was expanding, with teams now playing each other team home and away. Southern Vipers won the tournament, their third title, beating The Blaze in the 2023 final. Sunrisers defeated South East Stars in the 2024 final.

2024 was the final edition of the Rachael Heyhoe Flint Trophy. The ECB reversed the regionalised structure of the competition and replaced it with a new Women's One-Day Cup, using the county structure.

== Teams ==
Primary home ground of each team

The teams for the Rachael Heyhoe Flint Trophy are as follows:

Team	County partners	Home grounds (2023)	Captain
Central Sparks	Herefordshire; Shropshire; Staffordshire; Warwickshire; Worcestershire	Edgbaston Cricket Ground, Birmingham; New Road, Worcester; Sir Paul Getty's Ground, Wormsley; Scorers, Shirley	Evelyn Jones
Northern Diamonds	Durham; Northumberland; Yorkshire	Headingley Cricket Ground, Leeds; Riverside Ground, Chester-le-Street; North Marine Road Ground, Scarborough; Clifton Park, York; South Northumberland Cricket Club, Gosforth	Hollie Armitage
North West Thunder	Cheshire; Cumbria; Lancashire	Old Trafford Cricket Ground, Manchester; Rookwood Cricket Ground, Sale; Trafalgar Road Ground, Southport; Sedbergh School, Sedbergh	Eleanor Threlkeld
South East Stars	Kent; Surrey	County Cricket Ground, Beckenham; Woodbridge Road, Guildford	Bryony Smith
Southern Vipers	Berkshire; Buckinghamshire; Dorset; Hampshire; Oxfordshire; Sussex; Isle of Wight Cricket Board	Rose Bowl, Southampton; County Ground, Hove; Arundel Castle Cricket Ground, Arundel; Newclose County Cricket Ground, Newport	Georgia Adams
Sunrisers	Bedfordshire; Cambridgeshire; Essex; Hertfordshire; Huntingdonshire; Middlesex; Norfolk; Northamptonshire; Suffolk; Marylebone Cricket Club	County Cricket Ground, Chelmsford; County Ground, Northampton; Brunton Memorial Ground, Radlett	Grace Scrivens
The Blaze	Derbyshire; Leicestershire; Lincolnshire; Nottinghamshire; Loughborough University	Trent Bridge, Nottingham; Grace Road, Leicester; John Fretwell Sporting Complex, Nettleworth; Queen's Park, Chesterfield; Haslegrave Ground, Loughborough	Kirstie Gordon
Western Storm	Cornwall; Devon; Glamorgan; Gloucestershire; Somerset; Wiltshire; Cricket Wales	Bristol County Ground, Bristol; Sophia Gardens, Cardiff; County Ground, Taunton; College Ground, Cheltenham; Millfield School, Street	Sophie Luff

== Competition format ==
In the 2020 season, the teams were separated into a North and South Group, and each team played six group stage matches, in a double round-robin format. The two group winners played each other in the competition's final. In the following two seasons, the eight teams play each other once in a round-robin format. The second and third placed teams competed in a playoff, the winner of which played in the final against the first-placed team. In 2023, the tournament was expanded, with teams playing each other twice, home and away, in a double round-robin format. Ahead of the 2024 season, full semi-finals were added, with four teams now qualifying from the group stage.

Teams receive 4 points for a win. A bonus point is given where the winning team's run rate is 1.25 or greater times that of the opposition. In case of a tie in the standings, the following tiebreakers are applied in order: highest net run rate, team that scored the most points in matches involving the tied parties, better bowling strike rate, drawing of lots.

== Tournament results ==
List of Rachael Heyhoe Flint Trophy winners
Season	Winner	Runners-up	Final Venue	Player (club)	Runs	Player (club)	Wickets	Notes
Season	Winner	Runners-up	Final Venue	Leading run-scorer		Leading wicket-taker		Notes
2020	Southern Vipers	Northern Diamonds	Edgbaston, Birmingham	Georgia Adams (Southern Vipers)	500	Charlotte Taylor (Southern Vipers)	15	
2021	Southern Vipers	Northern Diamonds	County Ground, Northampton	Sophie Luff (Western Storm)	417	Kirstie Gordon (Lightning)	16	
2022	Northern Diamonds	Southern Vipers	Lord's, London	Lauren Winfield-Hill (Northern Diamonds)	470	Grace Scrivens (Sunrisers); Linsey Smith (Northern Diamonds)	13	
2023	Southern Vipers	The Blaze	County Ground, Northampton	Lauren Winfield-Hill (Northern Diamonds)	663	Georgia Davis (Central Sparks)	27	
2024	Sunrisers	South East Stars	Grace Road, Leicester	Alice Davidson-Richards (South East Stars)	650	Phoebe Turner (Northern Diamonds)	23	
