= Amelia Kemp =

English footballer

Personal information
- Full name: Amelia Kemp
- Place of birth: England
- Position: Defender

Team information
- Current team: Sunderland
- Number: 3

Youth career
- 2013–2015: Manchester United
- 2015–2016: Manchester City

Senior career*
Years	Team	Apps	(Gls)
2016–2017	Manchester City	0	(0)
2017–	Sunderland	15	(0)
- * Club domestic league appearances and goals as of 18:21, 20 January 2019 (UTC)

Amelia Kemp is an English footballer who plays as a defender for Sunderland.

== Club career ==
Having come through their academy system, Amelia Kemp made her first team debut for Manchester City when she replaced Lucy Bronze in an FA Women's Cup quarter-final against Sporting Club Albion on 3 April 2016.

Kemp left Manchester City the following season, joining Sunderland's academy while also playing for Durham University's women's team. In 2018–2019 she was promoted to their first team, playing in the FA Women's National League North.

== Career statistics ==
=== Club ===
As of match played 13 January 2019

Club	Season	League			Cup		League Cup		Continental		Total	
Club	Season	Division	Apps	Goals	Apps	Goals	Apps	Goals	Apps	Goals	Apps	Goals
Manchester City	2016	FA WSL	0	0	1	0	0	0	0	0	1	0
Manchester City	2017	FA WSL	0	0	0	0	0	0	0	0	0	0
Manchester City	Total		0	0	1	0	0	0	0	0	1	0
Sunderland	2017–18	FA WSL 2	0	0	0	0	0	0	—		0	0
Sunderland	2018–19	FA Women's National League	15	0	1	0	—		—		6	0
Sunderland	Total		5	0	1	0	0	0	—		6	0
Career total			5	0	2	0	0	0	0	0	7	0
