= Bedfordshire County Cricket Club =

English cricket club

Personnel
- Captain: George Thurstance

Team information
- Founded: 1899
- Home ground: Various

History
- Minor Counties Championship wins: 2
- MCCA Knockout Trophy wins: 1
- Official website: Bedfordshire CCC

Bedfordshire County Cricket Club is one of 20 Minor County clubs within the domestic cricket structure of England and Wales. It represents the historic county of Bedfordshire.

The team is currently a member of the Minor Counties Championship Eastern Division and plays in the MCCA Knockout Trophy. Bedfordshire played List A matches occasionally from 1967 until 2005 but is not classified as a List A team.

== History ==
Cricket had probably reached Bedfordshire by the end of the 17th century. The earliest reference to cricket in the county is a match in August 1741 at Woburn Park between a Bedfordshire XI and a combined Northants and Huntingdonshire XI. Woburn Cricket Club, under the leadership of the Duke of Bedford, became prominent in the 1740s and took part in a number of "great matches" against opponents such as London Cricket Club.

A county organisation has been traced back to May 1847 and a Bedfordshire team competed in the first Minor Counties Championship in 1895, with six other teams: it finished fourth. The county then missed the next four seasons before the current Bedfordshire County Cricket Club was founded on 3 November 1899, at which point it rejoined the competition in 1900. It has not missed any seasons since.

=== Honours ===
The county has won the Minor Counties Championship twice, in 1970 and in 1972, and shared the title in 2004 after drawing the title playoff match against Devon. The MCCA Knockout Trophy was won in 1999.

- Minor Counties Championship (2) - 1970, 1972; shared (1) - 2004
- MCCA Knockout Trophy (1) - 1999

== Notable players ==
See List of Bedfordshire County Cricket Club List A players and Category:Bedfordshire cricketers

The following Bedfordshire cricketers also made an impact on the first-class game:

- Louis Bookman
- Tom Clark
- Alastair Cook
- Alan Fordham
- Alf Gover
- Wayne Larkins
- Geoff Millman
- Monty Panesar
- Andy Roberts
- Will Smith
- Graeme Swann
- Alex Wakely
- David Willey

Rex Alston, who captained the side in 1932, subsequently became famous as a BBC radio commentator on cricket and other sports.

== Grounds ==
The club have no fixed home, but most of their matches are played in Wardown Park, Luton. Other recently used grounds include:

- Ampthill Park, Ampthill
- The Vale, Flitwick
- Goldington Bury, Bedford
- Lancot Park, Dunstable
- Southill Park Cricket Club, Southill
- Bedford Modern School, Bedford
- Bedford School, Bedford
