= Lancot Park =

Cricket ground in Bedfordshire, England

Coordinates: 51°52′57.41″N 0°33′28.69″W

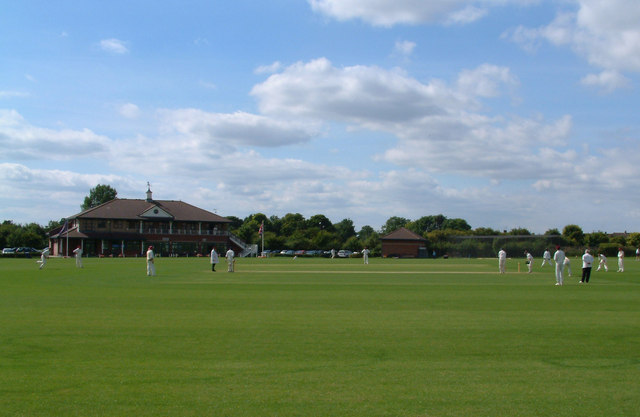

Ground information
- Location: Dunstable, Bedfordshire
- Establishment: 1993

Team information
Bedfordshire	(1994–present)
- As of 28 July 2010; Source: Ground profile

Lancot Park is a cricket ground in Dunstable, Bedfordshire. Situated at the foot of Dunstable Downs, on the outskirts of the village of Totternhoe, Lancot Park is the home of Dunstable Town Cricket Club. The ground and clubhouse was constructed in 1993 and hosted its first Minor Counties Championship the following year, when Bedfordshire played Northumberland in 1994. From 1994 to 2008, the ground played host to 13 Minor Counties Championship matches, with the final Minor Counties Championship match played to date at the ground in 2008 seeing Bedfordshire host Suffolk. The ground has also hosted 5 MCCA Knockout Trophy matches, the most recent of which saw Bedfordshire play Buckinghamshire in 2009.

The ground has also hosted a single List A match between Bedfordshire and the Derbyshire Cricket Board in the 1st round of the 2002 Cheltenham & Gloucester Trophy, which was played in 2001.

The Northamptonshire Second XI have also used the ground for Second XI Championship matches.

In local domestic cricket, Lancot Park is the home ground of Dunstable Town Cricket Club, who play Saturday cricket in the Hertfordshire Cricket League and in the Bedfordshire League on Sundays.
