= Northamptonshire Women cricket team =

English women's county cricket team

Northamptonshire Women

Personnel
- Captain: Anisha Patel (50-over); Gemma Marriott (T20)
- Coach: David Ripley

Team information
- Founded: Unknown First recorded match: 2001
- Home ground: cinch County Ground, Northampton with Northampton Road, Brixworth, to be used from 2027

History
- WCC wins: 0
- T20 Cup wins: 0
- Official website: Steelbacks Women

The Northamptonshire Women's cricket team, currently known as Northamptonshire Steelbacks Women, is the women's representative cricket team of Northamptonshire County Cricket Club. The side plays home matches at various grounds in Northamptonshire, including the cinch County Ground and Dolben Cricket Ground, Finedon.

Northamptonshire entered the national women's county structure in 2001. The team competed in the Women's County Championship until the competition ended in 2019, and subsequently took part in the Women's Twenty20 Cup and other county competitions. Since the restructuring of women's domestic cricket in 2025, Northamptonshire have competed in League 2 of the Women's One-Day Cup and Women's T20 Blast, as well as the knockout Women's T20 County Cup. The side is coached by David Ripley, with Anisha Patel captaining the 50-over team and Gemma Marriott the Twenty20 team.

== History ==
Northamptonshire Women joined the national women's cricket structure in 2001, playing in the Emerging Counties competition. Prior to this, they had only played one-off games, including matches in combined county sides. They were promoted from the Emerging Counties league in 2002, and subsequently moved between Division Three of the Women's County Championship and the County Challenge Cup, the tier below the Championship.

In 2008, Northamptonshire were promoted from Division 5 Midlands, after which they became a regular Division Four and Division Three side. In 2009, they joined the Women's Twenty20 Cup for its inaugural season and generally competed in the lower divisions of the competition.

The 2017 season saw Northamptonshire earn promotion in both the County Championship and the Twenty20 Cup, from Division Three to Division Two. They lost only one match across the two competitions and secured promotion in the Championship by defeating Durham by five wickets in a play-off. Northamptonshire batter Alicia Presland was the seventh-highest run-scorer in the Twenty20 Cup, with 224 runs.

Northamptonshire were relegated from Division Two in both competitions in 2018. In 2019, they again topped their division in both competitions. The Women's County Championship was discontinued after that season as part of a wider restructuring of women's domestic cricket.

In 2021, Northamptonshire competed in the East Midlands group of the Women's Twenty20 Cup, finishing sixth with one victory. In 2022, they won Group 5 of the 2022 Women's Twenty20 Cup, before losing the group final to Leicestershire. They also joined the East of England Women's County Championship that year, finishing fourth out of seven teams.

Northamptonshire won their regional group of the 2023 Women's Twenty20 Cup, defeating Hertfordshire in the final, and again finished fourth in the East of England Women's County Championship. In 2024, the side finished sixth in their Twenty20 Cup group and fourth in their group in the new ECB Women's County One-Day competition.

Ahead of the 2025 season, the England and Wales Cricket Board introduced a new structure for women's county cricket and Northamptonshire were placed in Tier 2. Former Northamptonshire men's head coach David Ripley was appointed head coach of the women's side. Gemma Marriott was appointed Twenty20 captain and Anisha Patel 50-over captain.

In the inaugural Women's One-Day Cup League 2 season, Northamptonshire finished third, winning seven of their nine league matches and qualifying for the semi-finals. Their campaign ended with a 61-run defeat to Glamorgan. In the Women's T20 Blast, they finished third in the League 2 North Group with three wins, four defeats and one no-result. Northamptonshire were also eliminated in the third round of the inaugural 2025 Women's T20 County Cup by Leicestershire, losing by 41 runs.

In 2026, Northamptonshire finished sixth in the Women's T20 Blast League 2, winning three of their eight matches. They reached the quarter-finals of the Women's T20 County Cup, where they were eliminated by Essex. In the One-Day Cup, Northamptonshire finished fourth in League 2 with five wins, two defeats and one tie, qualifying for the semi-finals. They were drawn away to league winners Middlesex at Radlett Cricket Club in the semi-final on 13 September.

== Players ==
=== Current squad ===
Based on the squad announced for the 2026 season.

Name	Nationality	Notes
Anisha Patel	England	50-over captain
Gemma Marriott	England	Twenty20 captain
Beth Ascott	England	
Emily Carpenter	England	Dual-registered with The Blaze Academy
Ava Clive	England	Dual-registered with Warwickshire Academy
May Drinkell	England	50-over competition only
Emma Gibbs	England	Dual-registered with Essex Academy
Chloe Hill	England	Wicket-keeper
Amelia Kemp	England	Dual-registered with Yorkshire Academy
Megan McColl	Scotland	Twenty20 competition only
Ella Phillips	England	
Alicia Presland	England	
Mabel Reid	England	Dual-registered with Essex Academy
Bethan Robinson	England	Dual-registered with Warwickshire Academy
Liz Russell	England	
Lenny Sims	England	
Clara Thaker	England	Dual-registered with Essex Academy

=== Notable players ===
Players who have played for Northamptonshire and played internationally are listed below, in order of first international appearance (given in brackets):

- (Republic of Ireland) Ciara Metcalfe (1999)
- (Pakistan) Zehmarad Afzal (2000)
- (New Zealand) Emma Campbell (2010)
- (Hong Kong) Jasmine Titmuss (2019)

== Seasons ==
=== Women's County Championship ===
Season	Division	League standings								Notes
Season	Division	P	W	L	T	A/C	BP	Pts	Pos	Notes
2001	Emerging Counties	2	–	–	–	–	–	–	Unknown	
2002	Emerging Counties	2	2	0	0	0	17.5	41.5	1st	Promoted
2003	Division 3	5	1	4	0	0	21.5	33.5	6th	
2004	County Challenge Cup G2	3	2	0	0	1	18	53	1st	
2005	County Challenge Cup G3	3	2	0	0	1	16.5	51.5	1st	Promoted
2006	Division 3	6	0	5	0	1	8	12	4th	Relegated
2007	County Challenge Cup Div A	6	0	3	0	3	5	35	4th	Relegated
2008	Division 5M	3	3	0	0	0	0	60	1st	Promoted
2009	Division 4	10	4	6	0	0	25	105	4th	
2010	Division 4	9	5	4	0	0	47	97	3rd	
2011	Division 4	10	4	5	0	1	50	90	4th	
2012	Division 3	8	1	3	0	4	18	28	7th	
2013	Division 3	8	6	2	0	0	54	114	2nd	
2014	Division 3	8	4	2	0	2	40	80	3rd	
2015	Division 3	8	3	4	0	1	27	57	7th	
2016	Division 3	8	3	2	0	3	27	57	4th	
2017	Division 3D	4	3	0	0	1	20	50	1st	Promoted
2018	Division 2	7	0	7	0	0	32	32	8th	Relegated
2019	Division 3B	5	5	0	0	0	36	86	1st	

=== Women's Twenty20 Cup ===
Season	Division	League standings								Notes
Season	Division	P	W	L	T	A/C	NRR	Pts	Pos	Notes
2009	Division 5	3	2	1	0	0	+1.13	4	1st	
2010	Division M&N 3	2	2	0	0	0	+2.75	4	1st	Promoted
2011	Division M&N 2	3	3	0	0	0	+1.84	6	1st	Lost promotion play-off
2012	Division M&N 2	3	0	3	0	0	−3.06	0	4th	
2014	Division 3B	4	2	2	0	0	−0.88	8	5th	
2015	Division 3	8	3	5	0	0	−1.02	12	5th	
2016	Division 3	8	4	4	0	0	−0.80	16	4th	
2017	Division 3C	8	7	1	0	0	+2.00	28	1st	Promoted
2018	Division 2	8	1	7	0	0	−1.90	4	8th	Relegated
2019	Division 3B	8	8	0	0	0	+2.20	32	1st	
2021	East Midlands	8	1	5	0	2	–1.92	6	6th	
2022	Group 5	6	6	0	0	0	+2.28	24	1st	Lost final
2023	Group 7	6	4	2	0	0	+1.21	16	1st	Group winners
2024	Group 2	8	2	2	0	4	–0.58	50	6th	

=== ECB Women's County One-Day ===
Season	Group	League standings								Notes
Season	Group	P	W	L	T	A/C	BP	Pts	Pos	Notes
2024	Group 2	4	2	2	0	0	2	10	4th	

== Honours ==
- Women's Twenty20 Cup:
  - Group winners (1) – 2023

== See also ==
- Northamptonshire County Cricket Club
- Sunrisers (women's cricket)
