= Bedfordshire Women cricket team =

Women's cricket team

Bedfordshire Women

Team information
- Founded: Unknown First recorded match: 1887
- Home ground: Lancot Park, Totternhoe, Dunstable

History
- T20 Cup wins: 0
- Official website: Bedfordshire Cricket

The Bedfordshire Women's cricket team is the women's representative cricket team for the English historic county of Bedfordshire. They played their first recorded match in 1887, against Huntingdonshire Women. They joined the Women's Twenty20 Cup in 2011, and played in the tournament until 2014. Since then, the side has not competed in any major county tournaments, and exists only at youth team level. Bedfordshire are partnered with the regional team Sunrisers.

== Seasons ==
=== Women's Twenty20 Cup ===
Season	Division	League standings								Notes
Season	Division	P	W	L	T	A/C	NRR	Pts	Pos	Notes
2011	Division S3	2	1	1	0	0	−0.39	2	2nd	Lost promotion play-off
2012	Division S3	3	0	3	0	0	−4.47	4	4th	
2013	Division S3	2	2	0	0	0	+1.38	4	1st	
2014	Division 4B	3	1	2	0	0	−0.39	4	11th	

== See also ==
- Bedfordshire County Cricket Club
- Sunrisers (women's cricket)
