= 2021 Central Sparks season =

Central Sparks
2021 season
- Coach: Lloyd Tennant
- Captain: Evelyn Jones
- RHFT: 3rd
- CEC: Group A, 3rd
- Most runs: RHFT: Evelyn Jones (299); CEC: Evelyn Jones (276)
- Most wickets: RHFT: Issy Wong (14); CEC: Georgia Davis (8)
- Most catches: RHFT: Emily Arlott (5); CEC: Evelyn Jones (3)
- Most wicket-keeping dismissals: RHFT: Amy Jones (6); CEC: Chloe Hill (3)

The 2021 season was Central Sparks' second season, in which they competed in the 50 over Rachael Heyhoe Flint Trophy and the new Twenty20 competition, the Charlotte Edwards Cup. The side finished third in the Rachael Heyhoe Flint Trophy, with 5 wins from their 7 matches, therefore advancing to the play-off stage. There, they played Northern Diamonds, but lost by 6 wickets. In the Charlotte Edwards Cup, the side finished third in Group A, winning 3 of their 6 matches.

The side was captained by Evelyn Jones and coached by Lloyd Tennant. They played three home matches at New Road, two at Edgbaston Cricket Ground and one at Edgbaston Foundation Ground.

== Squad ==
Central Sparks announced their initial 19-player squad on 26 May 2021. Davina Perrin was promoted to the senior squad from the Academy during the season, and played her first match on 10 September 2021. Age given is at the start of Central Sparks' first match of the season (29 May 2021).

Name	Nationality	Birth date	Batting style	Bowling style	Notes
Batters
Milly Home	England	27 February 2001 (aged 20)	Right-handed	Right-arm medium	
Evelyn Jones	England	8 August 1992 (aged 28)	Left-handed	Left-arm medium	Captain
Marie Kelly	England	9 February 1996 (aged 25)	Right-handed	Right-arm off break	
Davina Perrin	England	8 September 2006 (aged 14)	Right-handed	Right-arm leg break	
All-rounders
Clare Boycott	England	31 December 1993 (aged 27)	Right-handed	Right-arm medium	
Thea Brookes	England	15 February 1993 (aged 28)	Right-handed	Right-arm off break	
Stephanie Butler	England	23 April 1994 (aged 27)	Left-handed	Right-arm off break	
Ria Fackrell	England	16 September 1999 (aged 21)	Right-handed	Right-arm off break	
Wicket-keepers
Gwenan Davies	Wales	12 May 1994 (aged 27)	Left-handed	Right-arm medium	
Poppy Davies	England	23 June 2000 (aged 20)	Right-handed	—	
Chloe Hill	England	3 January 1997 (aged 24)	Right-handed	—	
Amy Jones	England	13 June 1993 (aged 27)	Right-handed	—	
Bowlers
Emily Arlott	England	23 February 1998 (aged 23)	Right-handed	Right-arm medium	
Hannah Baker	England	3 February 2004 (aged 17)	Right-handed	Right-arm leg break	
Georgia Davis	England	3 June 1999 (aged 21)	Right-handed	Right-arm off break	
Sarah Glenn	England	27 August 1999 (aged 21)	Right-handed	Right-arm leg break	
Anisha Patel	England	17 August 1995 (aged 25)	Right-handed	Right-arm leg break	
Grace Potts	England	12 July 2002 (aged 18)	Right-handed	Right-arm medium	
Elizabeth Russell	England	22 May 1994 (aged 27)	Left-handed	Right-arm medium	
Issy Wong	England	15 May 2002 (aged 19)	Right-handed	Right-arm medium	

== Rachael Heyhoe Flint Trophy ==
=== Season standings ===
Pos	Team	Pld	W	L	T	NR	BP	Pts	NRR
1	Southern Vipers (Q)	7	6	1	0	0	3	27	0.417
2	Northern Diamonds (Q)	7	5	2	0	0	3	23	1.182
3	Central Sparks (Q)	7	5	2	0	0	2	22	0.822
4	Lightning	7	3	4	0	0	1	13	0.274
5	South East Stars	7	3	4	0	0	1	13	−0.226
6	Western Storm	7	3	4	0	0	1	13	−0.462
7	North West Thunder	7	3	4	0	0	1	13	−0.620
8	Sunrisers	7	0	7	0	0	0	0	−1.598

Source: ESPN Cricinfo

Advanced to the final
Advanced to the play-off

=== Fixtures ===
29 May 2021
10:30 BST
Scorecard

Northern Diamonds; 279 (49.2 overs)	v	Central Sparks; 283/8 (48.2 overs)
Lauren Winfield-Hill 110 (126); Issy Wong 5/49 (10 overs)		Amy Jones 114 (114); Linsey Smith 3/54 (9 overs)

Central Sparks won by 2 wickets
Headingley, Leeds
Umpires: Hassan Adnan and Jasmine Naeem

- Central Sparks won the toss and elected to field.
- Points: Central Sparks 4, Northern Diamonds 0

31 May 2021
10:30 BST
Scorecard

Central Sparks; 295/7 (50 overs)	v	Western Storm; 254/9 (50 overs)
Amy Jones 163* (114); Lauren Filer 2/21 (6 overs)		Lauren Parfitt 91 (122); Ria Fackrell 4/34 (9 overs)

Central Sparks won by 41 runs
Edgbaston, Birmingham
Umpires: Sue Redfern and Yvonne Dolphin-Cooper

- Western Storm won the toss and elected to field.
- Points: Central Sparks 4, Western Storm 0

5 June 2021
10:30 BST
Scorecard

Central Sparks; 224 (49.2 overs)	v	Southern Vipers; 104 (27.5 overs)
Evelyn Jones 55 (103); Charlotte Taylor 3/22 (10 overs)		Danni Wyatt 61 (81); Emily Arlott 5/29 (8 overs)

Central Sparks won by 120 runs
County Ground, Hove
Umpires: Neil Pratt and Yvonne Dolphin-Cooper

- Central Sparks won the toss and elected to bat.
- Points: Central Sparks 5, Southern Vipers 0

12 June 2021
10:30 BST
Scorecard

Central Sparks; 203 (49.5 overs)	v	North West Thunder; 205/8 (48 overs)
Evelyn Jones 100* (150); Hannah Jones 3/33 (10 overs)		Emma Lamb 39 (47); Georgia Davis 3/42 (10 overs)

North West Thunder won by 2 wickets
New Road, Worcester
Umpires: Rob White and Yvonne Dolphin-Cooper

- Central Sparks won the toss and elected to bat.
- Points: North West Thunder 4, Central Sparks 0

10 September 2021
10:30 BST
Scorecard

Sunrisers; 204/7 (42 overs)	v	Central Sparks; 208/4 (37.2 overs)
Cordelia Griffith 69 (95); Ria Fackrell 3/30 (6 overs)		Marie Kelly 58 (63); Kelly Castle 1/22 (9 overs)

Central Sparks won by 6 wickets (DLS)
Merchant Taylors' School, Northwood
Umpires: Jasmine Naeem and Ian Ramage

- Central Sparks won the toss and elected to field.
- Central Sparks were set a revised target of 206 runs from 42 overs due to rain.
- Points: Central Sparks 4, Sunrisers 0

12 September 2021
10:30 BST
Scorecard

Central Sparks; 229 (49.1 overs)	v	South East Stars; 114 (31.3 overs)
Davina Perrin 43 (59); Ryana MacDonald-Gay 2/31 (9 overs)		Alice Capsey 26 (33); Georgia Davis 4/26 (10 overs)

Central Sparks won by 115 runs
New Road, Worcester
Umpires: James Middlebrook and Lina Nenova

- Central Sparks won the toss and elected to bat.
- Points: Central Sparks 5, South East Stars 0

18 September 2021
10:30 BST
Scorecard

Lightning; 320/6 (50 overs)	v	Central Sparks; 296/9 (50 overs)
Kathryn Bryce 162 (156); Issy Wong 3/61 (10 overs)		Marie Kelly 62 (69); Sonia Odedra 2/56 (9 overs)

Lightning won by 24 runs
Haslegrave Ground, Loughborough
Umpires: Jasmine Naeem and Neil Pratt

- Central Sparks won the toss and elected to field.
- Points: Lightning 4, Central Sparks 0

==== Play-off ====
22 September 2021
10:30 BST
Scorecard

Central Sparks; 175/7 (50 overs)	v	Northern Diamonds; 176/4 (32.5 overs)
Ria Fackrell 42* (80); Linsey Smith 2/25 (10 overs)		Ami Campbell 76 (78); Emily Arlott 2/35 (9 overs)

Northern Diamonds won by 6 wickets
North Marine Road Ground, Scarborough
Umpires: Sarah Bartlett and Rob White

- Central Sparks won the toss and elected to bat.

=== Tournament statistics ===
==== Batting ====
Player	Matches	Innings	Runs	Average	High score	100s	50s
Evelyn Jones	8	8	299	42.71	100*	1	2
Amy Jones	3	3	282	141.00	163*	2	0
Gwenan Davies	8	8	193	24.12	50	0	1
Marie Kelly	7	7	182	26.00	62	0	2
Sarah Glenn	4	4	118	39.33	71	0	1

Source: ESPN Cricinfo Qualification: 100 runs.

==== Bowling ====
Player	Matches	Overs	Wickets	Average	Economy	BBI	5wi
Issy Wong	8	63.5	14	21.35	4.68	5/49	1
Emily Arlott	7	55.0	11	23.72	4.74	5/29	1
Ria Fackrell	8	47.0	11	24.09	5.63	4/34	0
Georgia Davis	4	40.0	9	16.88	3.80	4/26	0
Sarah Glenn	4	36.0	6	22.50	3.75	2/32	0

Source: ESPN Cricinfo Qualification: 5 wickets.

== Charlotte Edwards Cup ==
=== Group A ===
Pos	Team	Pld	W	L	T	NR	BP	Pts	NRR
1	South East Stars (Q)	6	5	1	0	0	1	21	1.050
2	Southern Vipers (Q)	6	4	2	0	0	3	19	0.875
3	Central Sparks	6	3	3	0	0	0	12	−0.669
4	Lightning	6	0	6	0	0	0	0	−1.139

Source: ESPN Cricinfo
- Advanced to the final
- Advanced to the semi-final

=== Fixtures ===
26 June 2021
18:30 BST (D/N)
Scorecard

Central Sparks; 83 (17.5 overs)	v	Southern Vipers; 85/2 (13.1 overs)
Marie Kelly 36 (41); Charlie Dean 5/19 (3.5 overs)		Danni Wyatt 45 (33); Emily Arlott 1/13 (2 overs)

Southern Vipers won by 8 wickets
Edgbaston, Birmingham
Umpires: Anna Harris and Sarah Bartlett

- Southern Vipers won the toss and elected to field.
- Points: Southern Vipers 5, Central Sparks 0

3 July 2021
14:30 BST
Scorecard

Central Sparks; 117 (19 overs)	v	South East Stars; 118/5 (16.2 overs)
Evelyn Jones 49 (44); Alice Capsey 3/13 (3 overs)		Grace Gibbs 33* (27); Georgia Davis 3/21 (4 overs)

South East Stars won by 5 wickets
St Lawrence Ground, Canterbury
Umpires: Sarah Bartlett and Tom Lungley

- South East Stars won the toss and elected to field.
- Points: South East Stars 4, Central Sparks 0

10 July 2021
14:30 BST
Scorecard

Lightning; 81 (19.1 overs)	v	Central Sparks; 84/4 (19 overs)
Sophie Munro 20* (16); Georgia Davis 4/12 (4 overs)		Gwenan Davies 31 (49); Sophie Munro 2/10 (3 overs)

Central Sparks won by 6 wickets
Grace Road, Leicester
Umpires: James Middlebrook and Lina Nenova

- Lightning won the toss and elected to bat.
- Points: Central Sparks 4, Lightning 0

25 August 2021
14:30 BST
Scorecard

Southern Vipers; 162/4 (20 overs)	v	Central Sparks; 163/4 (19 overs)
Georgia Adams 88* (60); Issy Wong 1/20 (4 overs)		Marie Kelly 100* (53); Charlotte Taylor 2/36 (4 overs)

Central Sparks won by 6 wickets
County Cricket Ground, Hove
Umpires: Ben Debenham and Jasmine Naeem

- Central Sparks won the toss and elected to field.
- Points: Central Sparks 4, Southern Vipers 0

28 August 2021
14:30 BST
Scorecard

Lightning; 136/8 (20 overs)	v	Central Sparks; 139/6 (19.5 overs)
Abigail Freeborn 32 (33); Emily Arlott 2/13 (3 overs)		Evelyn Jones 71 (55); Sonia Odedra 2/14 (4 overs)

Central Sparks won by 4 wickets
New Road, Worcester
Umpires: Paul Pollard and Jane Pratt

- Central Sparks won the toss and elected to field.
- Points: Central Sparks 4, Lightning 0

30 August 2021
12:00 BST
Scorecard

South East Stars; 165/6 (20 overs)	v	Central Sparks; 139/6 (20 overs)
Emma Jones 46* (27); Clare Boycott 3/22 (3 overs)		Evelyn Jones 76 (68); Danielle Gregory 3/16 (4 overs)

South East Stars won by 26 runs
Edgbaston Foundation Ground, Birmingham
Umpires: Anna Harris and Graham Lloyd

- Central Sparks won the toss and elected to field.
- Points: South East Stars 4, Central Sparks 0

=== Tournament statistics ===
==== Batting ====
Player	Matches	Innings	Runs	Average	High score	100s	50s
Evelyn Jones	6	6	276	55.20	76	0	3
Marie Kelly	6	6	170	34.00	100*	1	0
Gwenan Davies	6	6	63	10.50	31	0	0
Thea Brookes	6	6	50	8.33	21	0	0

Source: ESPN Cricinfo Qualification: 50 runs.

==== Bowling ====
Player	Matches	Overs	Wickets	Average	Economy	BBI	5wi
Georgia Davis	3	12.0	8	6.87	4.58	4/12	0

Source: ESPN Cricinfo Qualification: 5 wickets.

== Season statistics ==
=== Batting ===
Player	Rachael Heyhoe Flint Trophy								Charlotte Edwards Cup							
Player	Matches	Innings	Runs	High score	Average	Strike rate	100s	50s	Matches	Innings	Runs	High score	Average	Strike rate	100s	50s
Emily Arlott	7	5	84	29*	42.00	79.24	0	0	5	5	31	22	10.33	67.39	0	0
Hannah Baker	–	–	–	–	–	–	–	–	3	2	1	1	0.50	16.66	0	0
Clare Boycott	5	3	48	17	16.00	53.93	0	0	4	1	0	0	0.00	0.00	0	0
Thea Brookes	4	4	90	33	30.00	76.92	0	0	6	6	50	21	8.33	76.92	0	0
Stephanie Butler	4	4	57	27	14.25	48.30	0	0	2	1	15	15	15.00	93.75	0	0
Gwenan Davies	8	8	193	50	24.12	69.67	0	1	6	6	63	31	10.50	67.02	0	0
Poppy Davies	1	1	0	0	0.00	0.00	0	0	–	–	–	–	–	–	–	–
Georgia Davis	4	3	21	13	10.50	67.74	0	0	3	2	2	1*	–	40.00	0	0
Ria Fackrell	8	7	75	42*	12.50	57.25	0	0	5	3	3	2*	3.00	30.00	0	0
Sarah Glenn	4	4	118	71*	39.33	113.46	0	1	–	–	–	–	–	–	–	–
Chloe Hill	4	3	49	34*	24.50	55.68	0	0	6	4	21	14	7.00	91.30	0	0
Milly Home	4	4	31	18	7.75	38.27	0	0	4	4	15	14	3.75	68.18	0	0
Amy Jones	3	3	282	163*	141.00	115.57	2	0	–	–	–	–	–	–	–	–
Evelyn Jones	8	8	299	100*	42.71	62.16	1	2	6	6	276	76	55.20	108.66	0	3
Marie Kelly	7	7	182	62	26.00	72.50	0	2	6	6	170	100*	34.00	127.81	1	0
Anisha Patel	1	–	–	–	–	–	–	–	2	–	–	–	–	–	–	–
Davina Perrin	4	4	92	43	23.00	74.79	0	0	–	–	–	–	–	–	–	–
Grace Potts	–	–	–	–	–	–	–	–	1	–	–	–	–	–	–	–
Elizabeth Russell	4	2	10	8*	10.00	111.11	0	0	1	–	–	–	–	–	–	–
Issy Wong	8	8	55	18	9.16	90.16	0	0	6	4	21	13*	7.00	123.52	0	0
Source: ESPN Cricinfo

=== Bowling ===
Player	Rachael Heyhoe Flint Trophy							Charlotte Edwards Cup						
Player	Matches	Overs	Wickets	Average	Economy	BBI	5wi	Matches	Overs	Wickets	Average	Economy	BBI	5wi
Emily Arlott	7	55.0	11	23.72	4.74	5/29	1	5	14.0	3	33.33	7.14	2/13	0
Hannah Baker	–	–	–	–	–	–	–	3	7.2	1	78.00	10.63	1/44	0
Clare Boycott	5	25.0	0	–	5.04	–	0	4	13.1	4	20.25	6.15	3/22	0
Stephanie Butler	4	12.0	2	44.00	7.33	2/46	0	2	4.0	1	22.00	5.50	1/13	0
Georgia Davis	4	40.0	9	16.88	3.80	4/26	0	3	12.0	8	6.87	4.58	4/12	0
Ria Fackrell	8	47.0	11	24.09	5.63	4/34	0	5	7.1	3	16.00	6.69	2/27	0
Sarah Glenn	4	36.0	6	22.50	3.75	2/32	0	–	–	–	–	–	–	–
Evelyn Jones	8	15.3	3	27.66	5.35	2/31	0	6	16.0	4	26.50	6.62	3/14	0
Marie Kelly	7	1.5	1	9.00	4.90	1/9	0	6	1.0	0	–	10.00	–	0
Anisha Patel	1	6.0	1	33.00	5.50	1/33	0	2	8.0	1	52.00	6.50	1/27	0
Davina Perrin	4	1.0	0	–	10.00	–	0	–	–	–	–	–	–	–
Grace Potts	–	–	–	–	–	–	–	1	3.0	2	11.50	7.66	2/23	0
Elizabeth Russell	4	28.2	4	35.75	5.04	1/13	0	1	3.0	0	–	9.33	–	0
Issy Wong	8	63.5	14	21.35	4.68	5/49	1	6	20.0	4	32.00	6.40	2/16	0
Source: ESPN Cricinfo

=== Fielding ===
Player	Rachael Heyhoe Flint Trophy			Charlotte Edwards Cup		
Player	Matches	Innings	Catches	Matches	Innings	Catches
Emily Arlott	7	7	5	5	5	2
Hannah Baker	–	–	–	3	3	1
Clare Boycott	5	5	0	4	4	0
Thea Brookes	4	4	0	6	6	1
Stephanie Butler	4	4	1	2	2	1
Gwenan Davies	8	7	1	6	6	1
Poppy Davies	1	1	0	–	–	–
Georgia Davis	4	4	0	3	3	0
Ria Fackrell	8	8	2	5	5	2
Sarah Glenn	4	4	2	–	–	–
Milly Home	4	4	0	4	4	0
Evelyn Jones	8	8	4	6	6	3
Marie Kelly	7	7	1	6	6	2
Anisha Patel	1	1	0	2	2	1
Davina Perrin	4	4	0	–	–	–
Grace Potts	–	–	–	1	1	0
Elizabeth Russell	4	4	1	1	1	0
Issy Wong	8	8	4	6	6	2
Source: ESPN Cricinfo

=== Wicket-keeping ===
Player	Rachael Heyhoe Flint Trophy				Charlotte Edwards Cup			
Player	Matches	Innings	Catches	Stumpings	Matches	Innings	Catches	Stumpings
Gwenan Davies	8	1	0	1	6	–	–	–
Chloe Hill	4	4	5	0	6	6	2	1
Amy Jones	3	3	5	1	–	–	–	–
Source: ESPN Cricinfo
