= 2020 Central Sparks season =

Central Sparks
2020 season
- Coach: Lloyd Tennant
- Captain: Evelyn Jones
- RHFT: North Group, 2nd
- Most runs: Evelyn Jones (334)
- Most wickets: Clare Boycott (8); Anisha Patel (8)
- Most catches: Emily Arlott (5)
- Most wicket-keeping dismissals: Gwenan Davies (4)

The 2020 season was Central Sparks' first season, in which they competed in the 50 over Rachael Heyhoe Flint Trophy following reforms to the structure of women's domestic cricket in England. The side finished second in the North Group of the competition, winning three of their six matches but failing to qualify for the final.

After the ending of the Women's Cricket Super League in 2019, the ECB announced the beginning of a new "women's elite domestic structure". Eight teams were included in this new structure, with Central Sparks being one of the new teams, representing the West Midlands. Due to the impact of the COVID-19 pandemic, only the Rachael Heyhoe Flint Trophy was able to take place. Central Sparks were captained by Evelyn Jones and coached by Lloyd Tennant, and played their home matches at Edgbaston and New Road.

== Squad ==
Central Sparks' squad is listed below. Age given is at the start of Central Sparks' first match of the season (29 August 2020).

Name	Nationality	Birth date	Batting Style	Bowling Style	Notes
Batters
Milly Home	England	27 February 2001 (aged 19)	Right-handed	Right-arm medium	
Evelyn Jones	England	8 August 1992 (aged 28)	Left-handed	Left-arm medium	Captain
Marie Kelly	England	9 February 1996 (aged 24)	Right-handed	Right-arm medium	
All-rounders
Clare Boycott	England	31 December 1993 (aged 26)	Right-handed	Right-arm medium	
Thea Brookes	England	15 February 1993 (aged 27)	Right-handed	Right-arm off break	
Stephanie Butler	England	23 April 1994 (aged 26)	Left-handed	Right-arm off break	
Wicket-keepers
Gwenan Davies	Wales	12 May 1994 (aged 26)	Left-handed	Right-arm medium	
Poppy Davies	England	23 June 2000 (aged 20)	Right-handed	—	
Chloe Hill	England	3 January 1997 (aged 23)	Right-handed	—	
Amy Jones	England	13 June 1993 (aged 27)	Right-handed	—	
Bowlers
Emily Arlott	England	23 February 1998 (aged 22)	Right-handed	Right-arm medium	
Hannah Baker	England	3 February 2004 (aged 16)	Right-handed	Right-arm leg break	
Georgia Davis	England	3 June 1999 (aged 21)	Right-handed	Right-arm off break	
Sarah Glenn	England	27 August 1999 (aged 21)	Right-handed	Right arm leg break	
Anisha Patel	England	17 August 1995 (aged 25)	Right-handed	Right-arm leg break	
Grace Potts	England	12 July 2002 (aged 18)	Right-handed	Right-arm medium	
Elizabeth Russell	England	22 May 1994 (aged 26)	Left-handed	Right-arm medium	
Issy Wong	England	15 May 2002 (aged 18)	Right-handed	Right-arm medium	

== Rachael Heyhoe Flint Trophy ==
=== North Group ===
Pos	Team	Pld	W	L	T	NR	BP	Pts	NRR
1	Northern Diamonds	6	5	1	0	0	3	23	1.000
2	Central Sparks	6	3	3	0	0	1	13	−0.285
3	North West Thunder	6	2	4	0	0	1	9	−0.515
4	Lightning	6	2	4	0	0	0	8	−0.113

Source: ESPN Cricinfo

Advanced to the Final.

=== Fixtures ===
29 August 2020
10:30 BST
Scorecard

Central Sparks; 144 (38.1 overs)	v	Northern Diamonds; 145/1 (24.1 overs)
Gwenan Davies 33 (44); Katherine Brunt 5/20 (9 overs)		Lauren Winfield 72 (71); Clare Boycott 1/5 (1 over)

Northern Diamonds won by 9 wickets
Edgbaston, Birmingham
Umpires: Jasmine Naeem and Sue Redfern

- Central Sparks won the toss and elected to bat.
- Points: Northern Diamonds 5, Central Sparks 0

31 August 2020
10:30 BST
Scorecard

North West Thunder; 135 (46.1 overs)	v	Central Sparks; 136/6 (44 overs)
Kate Cross 45 (73); Issy Wong 3/26 (10 overs)		Marie Kelly 59* (99); Sophie Ecclestone 2/13 (10 overs)

Central Sparks won by 4 wickets
Edgbaston, Birmingham
Umpires: Malinda Underdown and Sue Redfern

- North West Thunder won the toss and elected to bat.
- Points: Central Sparks 4, Thunder 0

5 September 2020
10:30 BST
Scorecard

North West Thunder; 166/8 (50 overs)	v	Central Sparks; 167/2 (38.1 overs)
Natalie Brown 27 (47); Clare Boycott 4/40 (10 overs)		Evelyn Jones 90 (113); Olivia Thomas 1/29 (4 overs)

Central Sparks won by 8 wickets
New Road, Worcester
Umpires: Malinda Underdown and Jeremy Lloyds

- North West Thunder won the toss and elected to bat.
- Points: Central Sparks 5, Thunder 0

11 September 2020
10:30 BST
Scorecard

Lightning; 233/8 (50 overs)	v	Central Sparks; 227/9 (50 overs)
Sarah Bryce 75 (98); Anisha Patel 3/49 (10 overs)		Marie Kelly 53 (82); Alicia Presland 3/26 (10 overs)

Lightning won by 6 runs
New Road, Worcester
Umpires: Hassan Adnan and Yvette Dolphin-Cooper

- Central Sparks won the toss and elected to field.
- Points: Lightning 4, Central Sparks 0

13 September 2020
10:30 BST
Scorecard

Northern Diamonds; 217 (50 overs)	v	Central Sparks; 218/4 (46.4 overs)
Sterre Kalis 87 (115); Elizabeth Russell 4/28 (9 overs)		Evelyn Jones 77 (114); Beth Langston 2/27 (8 overs)

Central Sparks won by 6 wickets
Headingley, Leeds
Umpires: Lina Nenova and Peter Hartley

- Northern Diamonds won the toss and elected to bat.
- Points: Central Sparks 4, Northern Diamonds 0

19 September 2020
10:30 BST
Scorecard

Lightning; 303/5 (50 overs)	v	Central Sparks; 248 (49.4 overs)
Sarah Bryce 136* (133); Anisha Patel 2/46 (10 overs)		Evelyn Jones 115* (138); Kathryn Bryce 3/54 (9.4 overs)

Lightning won by 55 runs
Grace Road, Leicester
Umpires: Paul Pollard and Malinda Underdown

- Central Sparks won the toss and elected to field.
- Points: Lightning 4, Central Sparks 0

== Statistics ==
=== Batting ===
Player	Matches	Innings	NO	Runs	HS	Average	Strike rate	100s	50s	4s	6s
Emily Arlott	6	3	0	24	19	8.00	72.72	0	0	2	0
Hannah Baker	2	1	0	5	5	5.00	62.50	0	0	0	0
Thea Brookes	3	2	1	10	6*	10.00	25.00	0	0	0	0
Clare Boycott	5	4	1	53	33*	17.66	44.91	0	0	3	0
Stephanie Butler	1	–	–	–	–	–	–	–	–	–	–
Gwenan Davies	6	6	0	169	50	28.16	68.14	0	1	22	0
Poppy Davies	4	4	2	47	31*	23.50	44.33	0	0	3	0
Georgia Davis	2	1	0	3	3	3.00	42.85	0	0	0	0
Sarah Glenn	2	2	0	23	23	11.50	51.11	0	0	1	0
Chloe Hill	4	3	1	34	23*	17.00	53.96	0	0	5	0
Milly Home	4	3	0	19	17	6.33	43.18	0	0	1	0
Amy Jones	2	2	0	38	26	19.00	64.40	0	0	4	0
Evelyn Jones	6	6	1	334	115*	66.80	74.05	1	2	42	0
Marie Kelly	6	6	2	223	59*	55.75	61.77	0	2	22	0
Anisha Patel	5	3	1	4	2*	2.00	40.00	0	0	0	0
Elizabeth Russell	5	3	1	2	1	1.00	50.00	0	0	0	0
Issy Wong	3	2	0	2	2	1.00	22.22	0	0	0	0
Source: ESPN Cricinfo

=== Bowling ===
Player	Matches	Innings	Overs	Maidens	Runs	Wickets	BBI	Average	Economy	Strike rate
Emily Arlott	6	6	49.0	2	209	3	1/24	69.66	4.26	98.0
Hannah Baker	2	2	20.0	1	75	4	3/26	18.75	3.75	
Thea Brookes	3	1	10.0	0	43	2	2/43	21.50	4.30	30.0
Clare Boycott	5	5	37.0	1	160	8	4/40	20.00	4.32	27.7
Stephanie Butler	1	1	9.0	0	38	0	–	–	4.22	–
Georgia Davis	2	2	18.1	2	81	4	3/29	20.25	4.45	27.2
Sarah Glenn	2	2	16.1	1	52	1	1/17	52.00	3.21	97.0
Evelyn Jones	6	2	4.0	0	37	0	–	–	9.25	–
Anisha Patel	5	5	44.0	3	202	8	3/49	25.25	4.59	33.0
Elizabeth Russell	5	5	41.0	3	174	6	4/28	29.00	4.24	41.0
Issy Wong	3	3	22.0	2	106	3	3/26	35.33	4.81	44.0
Source: ESPN Cricinfo

=== Fielding ===
Player	Matches	Innings	Catches
Emily Arlott	6	6	5
Hannah Baker	2	2	1
Thea Brookes	3	3	0
Clare Boycott	5	5	3
Stephanie Butler	1	1	0
Gwenan Davies	6	2	1
Poppy Davies	4	4	0
Georgia Davis	2	2	0
Sarah Glenn	2	2	0
Chloe Hill	4	4	1
Milly Home	4	4	0
Evelyn Jones	6	6	2
Marie Kelly	6	6	2
Anisha Patel	5	5	1
Elizabeth Russell	5	5	0
Issy Wong	3	3	0
Source: ESPN Cricinfo

=== Wicket-keeping ===
Player	Matches	Innings	Catches	Stumpings
Gwenan Davies	6	4	3	1
Amy Jones	2	2	2	0
Source: ESPN Cricinfo
