= Milly Home =

English cricketer (born 2001)

Personal information
- Full name: Milly Home
- Born: 27 February 2001 (age 25)
- Batting: Right-handed
- Bowling: Right-arm medium
- Role: Batter
- Relatives: Jack Home (brother); Guy Home (uncle)

Domestic team information
- Years: Team
- 2015–2017: Shropshire
- 2018–present: Warwickshire
- 2021–present: → Worcestershire (on loan)
- 2020–2022: Central Sparks

Career statistics
Competition	WLA	WT20
Matches	15	36
Runs scored	229	501
Batting average	17.61	16.16
100s/50s	0/1	0/1
Top score	53	88*
Balls bowled	24	36
Wickets	0	0
Bowling average	–	–
5 wickets in innings	0	0
10 wickets in match	0	0
Best bowling	–	–
Catches/stumpings	2/–	3/–
- Source: CricketArchive, 30 September 2022

Milly Home (born 27 February 2001) is an English cricketer who currently plays for Worcestershire, on loan from Warwickshire. She plays as a right-handed batter. She has previously played for Shropshire and Central Sparks, and has represented England at lacrosse at age-group and senior level.

== Domestic career ==
Home made her county debut in 2015, for Shropshire against Cornwall. In her third match, she scored her maiden county half-century, hitting 53 in a victory over Dorset. In 2016, Home made her Twenty20 high score, scoring 36* against Hertfordshire.

Home joined Warwickshire ahead of the 2018 season, playing 8 matches in the Twenty20 Cup and scoring 99 runs at an average of 14.14. In 2019, she only represented the side at age-group level. In 2021, Home went on loan to Worcestershire for the Twenty20 Cup. She scored 157 runs at an average of 52.33, including 88* from 63 balls against Berkshire. On 1 January 2022, it was announced that Home had extended her loan spell at Worcestershire for the 2022 county season. She scored 105 runs in 6 matches for the side in the 2022 Women's Twenty20 Cup.

In 2020, Home played for Central Sparks in the Rachael Heyhoe Flint Trophy. She appeared in four matches and scored 19 runs. In 2021, she appeared in four matches in the Rachael Heyhoe Flint Trophy and four matches in the Charlotte Edwards Cup, but made little impact with the bat. She appeared in two matches in the 2022 Rachael Heyhoe Flint Trophy, scoring 25 runs. Ahead of the 2023 season, it was confirmed that Home had left Central Sparks.
