= Issy Wong =

English cricketer

Personal information
- Full name: Isabelle Eleanor Chih Ming Wong
- Born: 15 May 2002 (age 24); Chelsea, London, England
- Batting: Right-handed
- Bowling: Right-arm fast-medium
- Role: Bowler

International information
- National side: England
- Test debut (cap 166): 27 June 2022 v South Africa
- Last Test: 10 July 2026 v India
- ODI debut (cap 139): 15 July 2022 v South Africa
- Last ODI: 9 September 2024 v Ireland
- T20I debut (cap 54): 21 July 2022 v South Africa
- Last T20I: 28 May 2026 v India

Domestic team information
- Years: Team
- 2018: Worcestershire
- 2019–present: Warwickshire
- 2019: Southern Vipers
- 2020–2024: Central Sparks
- 2024: → Western Storm (on loan)
- 2021–2024: Birmingham Phoenix
- 2021/22: Sydney Thunder
- 2023–2025: Mumbai Indians
- 2025: London Spirit
- 2025–present: Melbourne Renegades
- 2026-present: Southern Brave

Career statistics
Competition	WTest	WODI	WT20I	WLA
Matches	2	4	20	61
Runs scored	8	15	45	545
Batting average	8.00	15.00	9.00	14.34
100s/50s	0/0	0/0	0/0	0/1
Top score	7*	15	13	50
Balls bowled	319	114	395	2,428
Wickets	5	4	15	70
Bowling average	41.80	30.25	31.46	30.41
5 wickets in innings	0	0	0	1
10 wickets in match	0	0	0	0
Best bowling	2/41	3/36	2/10	5/49
Catches/stumpings	2/–	2/–	3/–	16/–
Medal record
Women's cricket
Representing England
T20 World Cup
Runner-up	2026 England
- Source: CricketArchive, 6 August 2026

Isabelle Eleanor Chih Ming Wong (born 15 May 2002) is an English cricketer who currently plays for Warwickshire, Southern Brave and England as a fast-medium bowler. She has previously played for Central Sparks, Southern Vipers in the Women's Cricket Super League, Mumbai Indians in Women's Premier League and Sydney Thunder in the Women's Big Bash League. She made her debut for England in June 2022.

== Early life and education ==
Wong was born in Chelsea, London, England. Her mother, Rachael, a freelance writer on cricket-related topics, is a native of Yorkshire. Her father, Dom, has Macanese ancestry, and a close connection with Hong Kong.

Two of Wong's great-uncles played international cricket for the Hong Kong men's team. One of them, Donald Anderson, was a lieutenant in the Hong Kong defence force, and was shot dead by a Japanese sniper during the Battle of Hong Kong in 1941. Only after Wong took up cricket did her family discover that he had also been a talented batting all-rounder, who, aged 17, had been the youngest cricketer to represent Hong Kong.

In the aftermath of Donald Anderson's death, Wong's great-grandmother, Phyllis Nolasco da Silva (née Anderson), recruited and ran a World War II network of spies in southern China for British Military Intelligence. After the war, she was decorated with the United Kingdom's highest civilian wartime award, the King's Medal for Service in the Cause of Freedom. Wong is also descended, through her great-grandfather, from the Macanese Nolasco da Silva family, which was long-established and prominent in Portuguese Macau.

At the age of five, Wong moved with her family from London to Warwickshire. There, she attended Bentley Heath Primary School in Solihull. At the age of six, she became involved in an after-school Chance to Shine cricket scheme run by the school, as one of just two girls in a group of 50 boys. She was soon besotted with the game. In 2022, she and Lauren Bell became the first full Chance to Shine participants to play for England.

Wong also took up a suggestion of her after-school coaches by joining the local Knowle and Dorridge Cricket Club at the end of her street. At that club, she was the only girl in a team of boys. A year later, she was selected in the Warwickshire Under 11s as part of the county's academy project. Wong was also one of the founder members of Berkswell Cricket Club's women's section which launched in 2015. Between 2015 and 2020, Wong attended Shrewsbury School.

In 2017, Wong was part of the near-capacity crowd of spectators at the Women's Cricket World Cup Final. In 2018, she was selected for the School Games National Cricket Finals, and in 2019, she became the first girl to play for Shrewsbury School's Boys 1st XI.

== Domestic career ==
Wong is a fast bowler, who can bowl at speeds in excess of 70 miles per hour (110 km/h). She started playing domestic cricket for Warwickshire. In 2019, she was part of the Warwickshire under-17s team that won their national competition, and the Warwickshire senior team that won the 2019 Women's Twenty20 Cup. She also played for Southern Vipers in the 2019 Women's Cricket Super League. She was the youngest player in the competition, and made three appearances in the tournament.

In 2020, Wong was given a professional contract by the West Midlands regional hub. In the same year, she was selected to play for Central Sparks in the Rachael Heyhoe Flint Trophy. She made three appearances in the tournament, as she was limited by her England playing commitments. In a match against North West Thunder, Wong took three wickets, which helped reduce Thunder to 18/4. She finished the match with figures of 3/26, including 47 dot balls, and was named player of the match. In December 2020, Wong was one of 41 women's cricketers given a full-time domestic cricket contract. Wong was selected to play for Birmingham Phoenix in The Hundred; the 2020 season was cancelled due to the COVID-19 pandemic, and Wong was retained by Phoenix for the 2021 season.

Wong was the third-highest wicket-taker in the 2021 Rachael Heyhoe Flint Trophy, with 14 wickets including taking 5/49 against Northern Diamonds. She also took 6 wickets at an average of 32.00 in The Hundred for Birmingham Phoenix.

In October 2021, it was announced that Wong had signed for Sydney Thunder for the upcoming WBBL|07 season, as a replacement for the injured Shabnim Ismail. Later that month, in a profile published in The Sydney Morning Herald to introduce her to Australians, her father was quoted as saying that "... with her attitude, she's more like an Aussie ... She really gets stuck in. She's never beaten."

On 9 November 2021, while batting for the Thunder against Adelaide Strikers at Karen Rolton Oval in Adelaide, Wong caused a sensation by hitting a total of six sixes: three in a row off South African captain Dane van Niekerk, two more off Australian international spearhead Megan Schutt, and another one off another Australian international, Amanda-Jade Wellington, who eventually bowled her for 43 runs from only 17 balls. Although Wong's innings did not prevent the Strikers from winning the match, it did combine with her successful bowling performances in several WBBL matches to generate speculation that she would be selected for the England's Women's Ashes squad due to tour Australia in January–February 2022. By 13 November 2021, when Wong was named player of the match for taking 2 for 27 in the Thunder's win against the Sydney Sixers at Mackay, Queensland, she had taken a total of seven wickets during WBBL|07, all of them of capped international players.

In April 2022, she was signed by the Birmingham Phoenix for the 2022 season of The Hundred. In August 2022, it was announced that she was moving from Sydney Thunder to Hobart Hurricanes for the upcoming Big Bash season. However, she was later forced to withdraw due to injury. Wong signed for the Mumbai Indians for the inaugural season of the Women's Premier League (WPL). In March 2023, she became the first person to take a hat-trick in the WPL.

In May 2024, it was announced that Wong had joined Western Storm on loan from Central Sparks for the 2024 Charlotte Edwards Cup. Her loan was later extended until the end of July.

== International career ==
In 2019, Wong played for the England Academy in a match against Australia A. She was added to the England Academy squad for the 2019/20 season. In 2020, Wong was one of 24 England players to resume training during the COVID-19 pandemic. Wong was one of three uncapped players in the training squad; the others were Lauren Bell and Emma Lamb. She was a nets bowler for the England players ahead of their series against the West Indies, but was not selected in the squad for the series. In January 2021, Wong travelled with the England squad for their series against New Zealand but was not part of the playing squad.

In December 2021, Wong was named in England's A squad for their tour to Australia, with the matches being played alongside the Women's Ashes. In June 2022, Wong was named as a travelling reserve in England's Women's Test squad for their one-off match against South Africa. She was then added to the squad for the Test match, after Emily Arlott did not recover from COVID-19. She made her Test debut on 27 June 2022, for England against South Africa. On 2 July 2022, Wong was also named in England's Women's One Day International (WODI) squad for their matches against South Africa. She made her WODI debut on 15 July 2022, also for England against South Africa, and took three wickets in her debut match. Later the same month, she was named in England's team for the cricket tournament at the 2022 Commonwealth Games in Birmingham, England. Wong made her Women's Twenty20 International (WT20I) debut on 21 July 2022, also during England's home series against South Africa. In November 2022, Wong was awarded with her first England central contract.

== Personal life ==
Wong's second favourite sport is association football. She and her family are fans of Liverpool Football Club. She also supports NBA basketball team the Golden State Warriors.

She is also a National U21 and U25 champion Eton fives player and has represented North Oxford EFC in the national league.

Off the sporting field, Wong's favourite film is the Disney production Cars; when she first played in the Women's Cricket Super League, she chose the shirt number 95, as a reference to the racing number of Lightning McQueen. Wong also plays the guitar "not very well", and is able to solve a Rubik's Cube in half-a-minute: she was seen doing so during the 2019 Women's Cricket Super League finals day. As of 2024, she is in a relationship with fellow England cricketer Katie George.
