= Anisha Patel =

English cricketer

Personal information
- Full name: Anisha Anil Patel
- Born: 17 August 1995 (age 31)
- Batting: Right-handed
- Bowling: Right-arm leg break
- Role: Bowler

Domestic team information
- Years: Team
- 2012–2024: Warwickshire
- 2020–2024: Central Sparks
- 2025–present: Northamptonshire

Career statistics
Competition	WLA	WT20
Matches	61	80
Runs scored	89	48
Batting average	4.94	6.00
100s/50s	0/0	0/0
Top score	17	16*
Balls bowled	2,145	1,431
Wickets	63	85
Bowling average	22.03	15.28
5 wickets in innings	1	0
10 wickets in match	0	0
Best bowling	6/17	4/7
Catches/stumpings	19/–	12/–
- Source: CricketArchive, 19 February 2026

Anisha Anil Patel (born 17 August 1995) is an English cricketer who currently plays for Northamptonshire. She is currently the 50 over captain and plays as a right-arm leg break bowler.

== Domestic career ==
Patel made her county debut in 2012, for Warwickshire against Lancashire, in which she took 1/10 from 5 overs. In the 2013 Women's Twenty20 Cup, she took 5 wickets at an average of just 5.20, and a season later she was Warwickshire's joint-leading wicket-taker in the same tournament, with 6 wickets at an average of 14.00. In 2015, she took 8 wickets at an average of 18.62 in the County Championship.

In 2017 and 2018, Patel was Warwickshire's leading wicket-taker in the County Championship, with 14 and 10 wickets, respectively. In 2017 she was also the joint-third leading wicket-taker across the whole tournament, and achieved her List A best bowling figures, taking 6/17 against Nottinghamshire. In 2019, Patel helped her side to the Twenty20 Cup title, taking 8 wickets at an average of 14.50, including best bowling figures of 4/12. In the 2021 Women's Twenty20 Cup, she took 3 wickets at an average of 20.33. In the 2022 Women's Twenty20 Cup, she was the leading wicket-taker across the entire competition, with 15 wickets at an average of 10.00. She took two four-wicket hauls in the competition, against Somerset and Gloucestershire. She took two wickets in Warwickshire's two 2023 Women's Twenty20 Cup matches.

In 2020, Patel played for Central Sparks in the Rachael Heyhoe Flint Trophy. She appeared in five matches, taking 8 wickets at an average of 25.25, the joint-most for the side. Her best bowling of 3/49 came in the Sparks' narrow defeat against Lightning. In 2021, she played one match for the side in the Rachael Heyhoe Flint Trophy, taking one wicket, and two matches in the Charlotte Edwards Cup, again taking 1 wicket. She played one match for the side in 2022, against Northern Diamonds in the Rachael Heyhoe Flint Trophy. She was named in the side's squad for the 2023 season, but did not play a match.

Following the domestic re-structure in 2025, Patel took 28 wickets across all Tier 2 competitions for Northamptonshire with best figures of 4-10 vs Derbyshire. She was then named T20 Player of the Year.
