= 2024 Charlotte Edwards Cup =

English cricket season

- Dates: 18 May 2024 – 22 June 2024
- Administrator: England and Wales Cricket Board
- Cricket format: Twenty20
- Tournament format(s): Group stage and knock-out finals
- Champions: The Blaze (1st title)
- Participants: 8
- Matches: 43
- Player of the series: Kathryn Bryce (The Blaze)
- Most runs: Kathryn Bryce (478)
- Most wickets: Kirstie Gordon (22)
- Official website: ECB

The 2024 Charlotte Edwards Cup was the fourth and final edition of the Charlotte Edwards Cup, an English women's cricket Twenty20 domestic competition, which took place between 18 May and 22 June 2024. It featured eight teams playing in a round-robin group stage, followed by a Finals Day. Southern Vipers were the defending champions. The tournament ran alongside the 2024 Rachael Heyhoe Flint Trophy.

The Blaze won the tournament, defeating South East Stars in the final.

== Format ==
Teams played ten matches in the group stage, playing four teams once and three teams twice. The top four in the group advanced to Finals Day, which was played at the County Ground, Derby. 24 group stage matches were played as double-headers with matches from the men's T20 Blast.

== Teams ==
The teams were as listed below.

- Central Sparks (representing Warwickshire, Worcestershire, Herefordshire, Shropshire and Staffordshire)
- Northern Diamonds (representing Yorkshire, Durham and Northumberland)
- North West Thunder (representing Lancashire, Cheshire and Cumbria)
- South East Stars (representing Surrey and Kent)
- Southern Vipers (representing Hampshire, Sussex, Berkshire, Buckinghamshire, Dorset, Isle of Wight and Oxfordshire)
- Sunrisers (representing Middlesex, Essex, Northamptonshire, Bedfordshire, Cambridgeshire, Hertfordshire, Huntingdonshire, Norfolk and Suffolk)
- The Blaze (representing Derbyshire, Leicestershire, Nottinghamshire and Lincolnshire)
- Western Storm (representing Glamorgan, Gloucestershire, Somerset, Cornwall, Devon, Wiltshire and Cricket Wales)

== Standings ==
Teams received 4 points for a win. A bonus point was given where the winning team's run rate is 1.25 or greater times that of the opposition. In case of a tie in the standings, the following tiebreakers were applied in order: highest net run rate, team that scored the most points in matches involving the tied parties, better bowling strike rate, drawing of lots.

| Pos | Team | Pld | W | L | T | NR | BP | Pts | NRR |
|---|---|---|---|---|---|---|---|---|---|
| 1 | The Blaze (Q) | 10 | 9 | 1 | 0 | 0 | 3 | 39 | 0.606 |
| 2 | South East Stars (Q) | 10 | 7 | 2 | 0 | 1 | 4 | 34 | 0.309 |
| 3 | Southern Vipers (Q) | 10 | 6 | 4 | 0 | 0 | 2 | 26 | 1.001 |
| 4 | Central Sparks (Q) | 10 | 6 | 4 | 0 | 0 | 2 | 26 | 0.402 |
| 5 | North West Thunder | 10 | 3 | 6 | 0 | 1 | 1 | 15 | −0.727 |
| 6 | Northern Diamonds | 10 | 3 | 7 | 0 | 0 | 1 | 13 | −0.067 |
| 7 | Western Storm | 10 | 2 | 6 | 0 | 2 | 1 | 13 | −0.659 |
| 8 | Sunrisers | 10 | 2 | 8 | 0 | 0 | 0 | 8 | −1.073 |

Source: ESPNCricinfo

advanced to the Semi-finals

== Fixtures ==
=== Group stage ===
18 May 2024
14:30
Scorecard

| The Blaze; 112/9 (20 overs) | v | Southern Vipers; 109/9 (20 overs) |
| Lucy Higham 36* (26); Mary Taylor 2/12 (4 overs) | | Ella McCaughan 19 (31); Kirstie Gordon 2/13 (4 overs) |

The Blaze won by 3 runs
Rose Bowl, Southampton
Umpires: James Tredwell and Sophie McLelland

- Southern Vipers won the toss and elected to field.
- Points: The Blaze 4, Southern Vipers 0

19 May 2024
13:00
Scorecard

| Northern Diamonds; 109/5 (20 overs) | v | North West Thunder; 112/2 (14.5 overs) |
| Emma Marlow 47* (53); Mahika Gaur 1/11 (4 overs) | | Emma Lamb 44* (43); Katie Levick 1/33 (4 overs) |

North West Thunder won by 8 wickets
Old Trafford Cricket Ground, Manchester
Umpires: Amy Clark and Paul Pollard

- Northern Diamonds won the toss and elected to bat.
- Points: North West Thunder 5, Northern Diamonds 0

19 May 2024
14:30
Scorecard

| Sunrisers; 138/6 (20 overs) | v | Central Sparks; 142/3 (14 overs) |
| Alice Macleod 54 (39); Hannah Baker 2/21 (4 overs) | | Davina Perrin 79* (48); Mady Villiers 2/37 (3 overs) |

Central Sparks won by 7 wickets
New Road, Worcester
Umpires: Fiona Richards and Simon Widdup

- Central Sparks won the toss and elected to field.
- Points: Central Sparks 5, Sunrisers 0

19 May 2024
14:30
Scorecard

| South East Stars; 132/9 (20 overs) | v | Western Storm; 128/6 (20 overs) |
| Aylish Cranstone 31 (20); Amanda-Jade Wellington 3/22 (4 overs) | | Emma Corney 40 (37); Danielle Gregory 1/18 (3 overs) |

South East Stars won by 4 runs
County Ground, Bristol
Umpires: Ben Peverall and Grace Bambury

- South East Stars won the toss and elected to bat.
- Points: South East Stars 4, Western Storm 0

22 May 2024
18:30
Scorecard

| Central Sparks; 168/6 (20 overs) | v | Western Storm; 147 (18.3 overs) |
| Abigail Freeborn 68 (40); Chloe Skelton 2/31 (4 overs) | | Danielle Gibson 40 (21); Katie George 4/36 (4 overs) |

Central Sparks won by 21 runs
County Ground, Taunton
Umpires: James Tredwell and Julia Jarvis

- Western Storm won the toss and elected to field.
- Points: Central Sparks 4, Western Storm 0

23 May 2024
18:30
Scorecard

| The Blaze; 136 (20 overs) | v | Northern Diamonds; 132/7 (20 overs) |
| Kathryn Bryce 31 (29); Erin Burns 5/25 (4 overs) | | Lauren Winfield-Hill 38 (37); Kirstie Gordon 3/20 (4 overs) |

The Blaze won by 4 runs
Trent Bridge, Nottingham
Umpires: Amy Clark and Simon Widdup

- Northern Diamonds won the toss and elected to field.
- Points: The Blaze 4, Northern Diamonds 0

24 May 2024
14:30
Scorecard

| North West Thunder; 139/7 (20 overs) | v | South East Stars; 140/5 (16 overs) |
| Fi Morris 41 (27); Tash Farrant 2/17 (4 overs) | | Paige Scholfield 73* (39); Tara Norris 1/13 (3 overs) |

South East Stars won by 5 wickets
County Ground, Beckenham
Umpires: Ben Peverall and Rose Dovey

- South East Stars won the toss and elected to field.
- Points: South East Stars 5, North West Thunder 0

24 May 2024
18:30
Scorecard

| Southern Vipers; 171/2 (20 overs) | v | Sunrisers; 152/5 (20 overs) |
| Georgia Elwiss 73* (57); Mady Villiers 1/20 (4 overs) | | Jo Gardner 79* (61); Mary Taylor 2/29 (4 overs) |

Southern Vipers won by 19 runs
County Ground, Chelmsford
Umpires: Gabi Brown and Simon Widdup

- Sunrisers won the toss and elected to field.
- Points: Southern Vipers 4, Sunrisers 0

26 May 2024
14:30
Scorecard

| North West Thunder; 151/6 (20 overs) | v | The Blaze; 152/5 (18.5 overs) |
| Emma Lamb 63* (50); Grace Ballinger 2/25 (4 overs) | | Kathryn Bryce 61 (51); Mahika Gaur 3/39 (4 overs) |

The Blaze won by 5 wickets
Haslegrave Ground, Loughborough
Umpires: Joanne Ibbotson and Neil Mallender

- The Blaze won the toss and elected to field.
- Points: The Blaze 4, North West Thunder 0

27 May 2024
14:30
Scorecard

| Northern Diamonds; 80/9 (11 overs) | v | Central Sparks; 81/7 (11 overs) |
| Erin Burns 30 (18); Grace Potts 3/15 (2 overs) | | Evelyn Jones 26* (18); Rachel Slater 2/10 (2 overs) |

Central Sparks won by 3 wickets
Headingley Cricket Ground, Leeds
Umpires: Amy Clark and Simon Widdup

- Central Sparks won the toss and elected to field.
- Match reduced to 11 overs per side due to rain.
- Points: Central Sparks 4, Northern Diamonds 0

27 May 2024
14:30
Scorecard

| Western Storm; 38/3 (6 overs) | v | South East Stars |
| Niamh Holland 20 (18); Tash Farrant 1/8 (2 overs) |

No result
County Ground, Beckenham
Umpires: Fiona Richards and James Tredwell

- South East Stars won the toss and elected to field.
- No further play possible due to rain.
- Points: South East Stars 2, Western Storm 2

27 May 2024
14:30
Scorecard

| Sunrisers; 134/5 (20 overs) | v | Southern Vipers; 131/6 (20 overs) |
| Jo Gardner 42 (39); Freya Davies 3/22 (4 overs) | | Charli Knott 50 (41); Sophie Munro 4/27 (4 overs) |

Sunrisers won by 3 runs
Arundel Castle Cricket Ground, Arundel
Umpires: Ben Peverall and Rose Dovey

- Southern Vipers won the toss and elected to field.
- Points: Sunrisers 4, Southern Vipers 0

30 May 2024
13:30
Scorecard

| Central Sparks; 121/8 (20 overs) | v | North West Thunder; 125/7 (19 overs) |
| Emily Arlott 28 (22); Phoebe Graham 3/16 (4 overs) | | Fi Morris 43 (38); Georgia Davis 2/19 (3 overs) |

North West Thunder won by 3 wickets
Old Trafford Cricket Ground, Manchester
Umpires: Joanne Ibbotson and Simon Widdup

- North West Thunder won the toss and elected to bat.
- Points: North West Thunder 4, Central Sparks 0

30 May 2024
15:00
Scorecard

| Southern Vipers; 173/5 (20 overs) | v | Western Storm; 145/7 (20 overs) |
| Georgia Adams 48 (34); Amanda-Jade Wellington 3/20 (4 overs) | | Sophie Luff 34* (31); Charli Knott 4/23 (4 overs) |

Southern Vipers won by 28 runs
Rose Bowl, Southampton
Umpires: Ben Peverall and Rose Dovey

- Western Storm won the toss and elected to field.
- Points: Southern Vipers 4, Western Storm 0

31 May 2024
14:30
Scorecard

| Northern Diamonds; 124 (19.3 overs) | v | South East Stars; 127/4 (16 overs) |
| Leah Dobson 55 (46); Matilda Corteen-Coleman 5/19 (3.3 overs) | | Bryony Smith 57 (41); Hollie Armitage 2/22 (3 overs) |

South East Stars won by 6 wickets
Riverside Ground, Chester-le-Street
Umpires: Jasmine Naeem and Naeem Ashraf

- Northern Diamonds won the toss and elected to bat.
- Matilda Corteen-Coleman took four wickets in four balls.
- Points: South East Stars 5, Northern Diamonds 0

31 May 2024
14:30
Scorecard

| The Blaze; 134/6 (20 overs) | v | Central Sparks; 124/7 (20 overs) |
| Kathryn Bryce 57 (47); Emily Arlott 2/23 (4 overs) | | Katie George 28* (25); Kirstie Gordon 2/22 (4 overs) |

The Blaze won by 10 runs
Trent Bridge, Nottingham
Umpires: Amy Clark and Anthony Harris

- Central Sparks won the toss and elected to field.
- Points: The Blaze 4, Central Sparks 0

31 May 2024
14:30
Scorecard

| Western Storm; 134/8 (20 overs) | v | Sunrisers; 106 (17.4 overs) |
| Sophie Luff 41 (34); Mady Villiers 2/20 (4 overs) | | Florence Miller 28 (30); Ellie Anderson 4/9 (2.4 overs) |

Western Storm won by 28 runs
County Ground, Taunton
Umpires: Ben Peverall and Gabi Brown

- Sunrisers won the toss and elected to field.
- Points: Western Storm 5, Sunrisers 0

2 June 2024
11:30
Scorecard

| Northern Diamonds; 123/8 (20 overs) | v | Sunrisers; 126/6 (20 overs) |
| Hollie Armitage 39 (40); Mady Villiers 2/22 (4 overs) | | Grace Scrivens 64* (57); Hollie Armitage 3/16 (3 overs) |

Sunrisers won by 4 wickets
County Ground, Northampton
Umpires: Jasmine Naeem and Simon Widdup

- Sunrisers won the toss and elected to field.
- Points: Sunrisers 4, Northern Diamonds 0

2 June 2024
13:30
Scorecard

| Southern Vipers; 142/6 (20 overs) | v | South East Stars; 146/4 (18.1 overs) |
| Alice Monaghan 44* (33); Danielle Gregory 3/23 (4 overs) | | Sophia Dunkley 53 (42); Charli Knott 2/29 (4 overs) |

South East Stars won by 6 wickets
The Oval, London
Umpires: James Tredwell and Rose Dovey

- South East Stars won the toss and elected to field.
- Points: South East Stars 4, Southern Vipers 0

2 June 2024
16:00
Scorecard

| North West Thunder; 111/9 (20 overs) | v | The Blaze; 112/3 (15.4 overs) |
| Danielle Collins 30 (32); Kirstie Gordon 5/12 (4 overs) | | Tammy Beaumont 34* (45); Kate Cross 1/16 (2.4 overs) |

The Blaze won by 7 wickets
Old Trafford Cricket Ground, Manchester
Umpires: Gabi Brown and Naeem Ashraf

- North West Thunder won the toss and elected to bat.
- Points: The Blaze 5, North West Thunder 0

6 June 2024
14:15
Scorecard

| Sunrisers; 116/8 (20 overs) | v | South East Stars; 118/4 (15 overs) |
| Florence Miller 39* (45); Emma Jones 2/13 (2 overs) | | Paige Scholfield 50* (35); Jodi Grewcock 2/18 (3 overs) |

South East Stars won by 6 wickets
Lord's, London
Umpires: Jack Shantry and Joanne Ibbotson

- South East Stars won the toss and elected to field.
- Points: South East Stars 5, Sunrisers 0

7 June 2024
14:30
Scorecard

| Western Storm; 99 (19.3 overs) | v | The Blaze; 103/3 (14.1 overs) |
| Heather Knight 20 (19); Heather Graham 4/10 (3.3 overs) | | Kathryn Bryce 46 (33); Ellie Anderson 1/16 (2 overs) |

The Blaze won by 7 wickets
Grace Road, Leicester
Umpires: Neil Pratt and Rose Dovey

- Western Storm won the toss and elected to bat.
- Points: The Blaze 5, Western Storm 0

7 June 2024
14:30
Scorecard

| North West Thunder; 85 (19.5 overs) | v | Southern Vipers; 86/3 (10.5 overs) |
| Tara Norris 13* (21); Linsey Smith 3/9 (4 overs) | | Charli Knott 45 (28); Sophie Ecclestone 2/23 (4 overs) |

Southern Vipers won by 7 wickets
Old Trafford Cricket Ground, Manchester
Umpires: Amy Clark and Hassan Adnan

- Southern Vipers won the toss and elected to field.
- Points: Southern Vipers 5, North West Thunder 0

8 June 2024
11:30
Scorecard

| Northern Diamonds; 137/7 (20 overs) | v | Central Sparks; 124/8 (20 overs) |
| Hollie Armitage 62 (49); Hannah Baker 3/24 (4 overs) | | Amy Jones 39 (30); Katie Levick 2/32 (4 overs) |

Northern Diamonds won by 13 runs
Edgbaston Cricket Ground, Birmingham
Umpires: Chris Watts and Rose Dovey

- Central Sparks won the toss and elected to field.
- Points: Northern Diamonds 4, Central Sparks 0

9 June 2024
10:30
Scorecard

| Southern Vipers; 137/9 (20 overs) | v | Western Storm; 119 (20 overs) |
| Georgia Adams 55 (40); Lauren Filer 3/8 (4 overs) | | Heather Knight 69 (56); Georgia Adams 3/23 (4 overs) |

Southern Vipers won by 18 runs
County Ground, Bristol
Umpires: Fiona Richards and Jack Shantry

- Western Storm won the toss and elected to field.
- Points: Southern Vipers 4, Western Storm 0

9 June 2024
11:00
Scorecard

| The Blaze; 159/7 (20 overs) | v | Northern Diamonds; 146 (19.5 overs) |
| Kathryn Bryce 54 (39); Erin Burns 3/19 (4 overs) | | Bess Heath 59 (32); Sarah Glenn 3/33 (4 overs) |

The Blaze won by 13 runs
Headingley Cricket Ground, Leeds
Umpires: Amy Clark and Neil Mallender

- Northern Diamonds won the toss and elected to field.
- Points: The Blaze 4, Northern Diamonds 0

9 June 2024
11:00
Scorecard

| South East Stars; 122/8 (20 overs) | v | Central Sparks; 123/7 (19.2 overs) |
| Sophia Dunkley 58 (49); Emily Arlott 4/21 (4 overs) | | Evelyn Jones 43 (52); Matilda Corteen-Coleman 3/14 (4 overs) |

Central Sparks won by 3 wickets
St Lawrence Ground, Canterbury
Umpires: James Tredwell and Julia Jarvis

- South East Stars won the toss and elected to bat.
- Emily Arlott took a hat-trick.
- Points: Central Sparks 4, South East Stars 0

9 June 2024
13:00
Scorecard

| Sunrisers; 151/9 (20 overs) | v | North West Thunder; 155/5 (19.3 overs) |
| Alice Macleod 60 (43); Sophie Ecclestone 3/18 (4 overs) | | Seren Smale 39* (33); Eva Gray 2/28 (4 overs) |

North West Thunder won by 5 wickets
Stanley Park, Blackpool
Umpires: Jasmine Naeem and Peter Hartley

- Sunrisers won the toss and elected to bat.
- Points: North West Thunder 4, Sunrisers 0

13 June 2024
14:15
Scorecard

| Sunrisers; 137/7 (20 overs) | v | The Blaze; 140/2 (15.1 overs) |
| Grace Scrivens 42 (38); Heather Graham 2/22 (4 overs) | | Kathryn Bryce 57* (37); Eva Gray 1/24 (3 overs) |

The Blaze won by 8 wickets
Lord's, London
Umpires: Gabi Brown and James Tredwell

- The Blaze won the toss and elected to field.
- Points: The Blaze 5, Sunrisers 0

13 June 2024
14:30
Scorecard

| Western Storm | v | North West Thunder |

Match Abandoned
Sophia Gardens, Cardiff

- No toss.
- No play possible due to rain.
- Points: Western Storm 2, North West Thunder 2

14 June 2024
15:00
Scorecard

| North West Thunder; 146/6 (20 overs) | v | Central Sparks; 150/2 (20 overs) |
| Seren Smale 88* (61); Grace Potts 2/18 (4 overs) | | Abigail Freeborn 71* (57); Kate Cross 1/19 (4 overs) |

Central Sparks won by 8 wickets
Edgbaston Cricket Ground, Birmingham
Umpires: Gabi Brown and Hassan Adnan

- Central Sparks won the toss and elected to field.
- Points: Central Sparks 4, North West Thunder 0

14 June 2024
15:00
Scorecard

| Northern Diamonds; 145/4 (20 overs) | v | Southern Vipers; 146/5 (18.5 overs) |
| Hollie Armitage 69* (60); Lauren Bell 2/31 (4 overs) | | Charlie Dean 64* (38); Rachel Slater 2/23 (4 overs) |

Southern Vipers won by 5 wickets
Rose Bowl, Southampton
Umpires: Ben Peverall and Rose Dovey

- Northern Diamonds won the toss and elected to bat.
- Points: Southern Vipers 4, Northern Diamonds 0

15 June 2024
14:30
Scorecard

| South East Stars; 153/4 (18 overs) | v | Sunrisers; 111/5 (15.5 overs) |
| Georgia Redmayne 38* (40); Mady Villiers 2/23 (4 overs) | | Grace Scrivens 62* (48); Danielle Gregory 2/21 (3 overs) |

South East Stars won by 19 runs (DLS)
The Oval, London
Umpires: Ben Peverall and Gabi Brown

- Sunrisers won the toss and elected to field.
- Points: South East Stars 4, Sunrisers 0

16 June 2024
10:30
Scorecard

| Southern Vipers; 98 (17.5 overs) | v | Central Sparks; 99/5 (14.5 overs) |
| Rhianna Southby 19 (20); Bethan Ellis 2/11 (3 overs) | | Davina Perrin 26 (17); Linsey Smith 2/13 (4 overs) |

Central Sparks won by 5 wickets
New Road, Worcester
Umpires: Anthony Harris and Fiona Richards

- Central Sparks won the toss and elected to field.
- Points: Central Sparks 5, Southern Vipers 0

16 June 2024
11:00
Scorecard

| Northern Diamonds; 146/3 (20 overs) | v | Western Storm; 118/7 (20 overs) |
| Hollie Armitage 97 (64); Sophia Smale 1/23 (4 overs); Issy Wong 1/23 (4 overs) | | Fran Wilson 42 (44); Katie Levick 2/13 (4 overs) |

Northern Diamonds won by 28 runs
Headingley Cricket Ground, Leeds
Umpires: Amy Clark and Peter Hartley

- Western Storm won the toss and elected to bat.
- Points: Northern Diamonds 4, Western Storm 0

16 June 2024
11:30
Scorecard

| The Blaze; 84 (18.5 overs) | v | South East Stars; 89/5 (15.1 overs) |
| Sarah Glenn 21 (24); Alexa Stonehouse 3/13 (4 overs) | | Emma Jones 30* (15); Sarah Glenn 3/14 (4 overs) |

South East Stars won by 5 wickets
County Ground, Derby
Umpires: Rob White and Sophie McLelland

- The Blaze won the toss and elected to bat.
- Points: South East Stars 5, The Blaze 0

19 June 2024
11:30
Scorecard

| Central Sparks; 138/8 (20 overs) | v | The Blaze; 139/5 (19.2 overs) |
| Abigail Freeborn 39 (32); Josie Groves 2/13 (2 overs) | | Marie Kelly 89* (63); Grace Potts 1/16 (3 overs) |

The Blaze won by 5 wickets
Edgbaston Cricket Ground, Birmingham
Umpires: Gabi Brown and Sue Redfern

- Central Sparks won the toss and elected to bat.
- Points: The Blaze 4, Central Sparks 0

19 June 2024
11:30
Scorecard

| North West Thunder; 61 (14.2 overs) | v | Northern Diamonds; 62/5 (13.4 overs) |
| Tara Norris 13 (12); Rachel Slater 3/12 (4 overs) | | Rebecca Duckworth 21* (27); Sophie Morris 2/13 (4 overs) |

Northern Diamonds won by 5 wickets
Riverside Ground, Chester-le-Street
Umpires: Jasmine Naeem and Neil Pratt

- Northern Diamonds won the toss and elected to field.
- Points: Northern Diamonds 5, North West Thunder 0

19 June 2024
11:30
Scorecard

| Southern Vipers; 179/5 (20 overs) | v | South East Stars; 66 (14 overs) |
| Maia Bouchier 93 (55); Tash Farrant 2/34 (3 overs) | | Bryony Smith 22 (9); Charlie Dean 3/5 (3 overs) |

Southern Vipers won by 113 runs
County Ground, Hove
Umpires: Fiona Richards and James Tredwell

- South East Stars won the toss and elected to field.
- Points: Southern Vipers 5, South East Stars 0

19 June 2024
11:30
Scorecard

| Western Storm; 142/7 (20 overs) | v | Sunrisers; 131/9 (20 overs) |
| Heather Knight 66 (43); Sophie Munro 4/23 (4 overs) | | Jodi Grewcock 40 (34); Amanda-Jade Wellington 2/24 (4 overs) |

Western Storm won by 11 runs
County Ground, Chelmsford
Umpires: Julia Jarvis and Rob White

- Western Storm won the toss and elected to bat.
- Points: Western Storm 4, Sunrisers 0

== Knockout stage ==
Semi-finals
1 | The Blaze | 142/5
4 | Central Sparks | 140/9
2 | South East Stars | 162/5
3 | Southern Vipers | 157/9

Final
1 | The Blaze | 144/3
2 | South East Stars | 141/9

=== Semi-finals ===
22 June 2024
11:00 BST
Scorecard

| Central Sparks; 140/9 (20 overs) | v | The Blaze; 142/5 (18 overs) |
| Courtney Webb 45* (31); Josie Groves 2/16 (4 overs) | | Kathryn Bryce 44 (39); Hannah Baker 3/24 (4 overs) |

The Blaze won by 5 wickets
County Cricket Ground, Derby
Umpires: Rose Dovey and Simon Widdup
Player of the match: Kathryn Bryce (The Blaze)

- The Blaze won the toss and elected to field.

22 June 2024
14:30 BST
Scorecard

| South East Stars; 162/5 (20 overs) | v | Southern Vipers; 157/9 (20 overs) |
| Sophia Dunkley 49 (34); Linsey Smith 1/20 (4 overs) | | Charlie Dean 43 (29); Matilda Corteen-Coleman 2/23 (4 overs) |

South East Stars won by 5 runs
County Cricket Ground, Derby
Umpires: Gabi Brown and James Tredwell
Player of the match: Georgia Redmayne (South East Stars)

- Southern Vipers won the toss and elected to field.

=== Final ===
22 June 2024
18:45 BST (D/N)
Scorecard

| South East Stars; 141/9 (20 overs) | v | The Blaze; 144/3 (18.4 overs) |
| Georgia Redmayne 25 (25); Heather Graham 3/16 (4 overs) | | Kathryn Bryce 62 (45); Danielle Gregory 1/26 (4 overs) |

The Blaze won by 7 wickets
County Cricket Ground, Derby
Umpires: Anna Harris and Rob White
Player of the match: Kathryn Bryce (The Blaze)

- The Blaze won the toss and elected to field.

== Statistics ==
- Highest score by a team: Southern Vipers – 179/5 (20 overs) v South East Stars (19 June).
- Top score by an individual: Hollie Armitage – 97 (64) v Western Storm (16 June).
- Best bowling figures by an individual: Kirstie Gordon – 5/12 (4 overs) v North West Thunder (2 June).

=== Most runs ===
| Player | Team | Matches | Innings | Runs | Average | HS | 100s | 50s |
|---|---|---|---|---|---|---|---|---|
| Kathryn Bryce | The Blaze | 12 | 12 | 478 | 43.45 | 62 | 0 | 5 |
| Hollie Armitage | Northern Diamonds | 10 | 10 | 323 | 35.88 | 97 | 0 | 3 |
| Sophia Dunkley | South East Stars | 9 | 9 | 265 | 29.44 | 58 | 0 | 2 |
| Jo Gardner | Sunrisers | 10 | 10 | 260 | 32.50 | 79* | 0 | 1 |
| Paige Scholfield | South East Stars | 10 | 9 | 259 | 43.16 | 73* | 0 | 3 |

Source: ESPNCricinfo

=== Most wickets ===
| Player | Team | Overs | Wickets | Average | BBI | 5w |
|---|---|---|---|---|---|---|
| Kirstie Gordon | The Blaze | 47.1 | 22 | 12.50 | 5/12 | 1 |
| Erin Burns | Northern Diamonds | 30.1 | 16 | 11.75 | 5/25 | 1 |
| Matilda Corteen-Coleman | South East Stars | 41.2 | 16 | 13.31 | 5/19 | 1 |
| Charli Knott | Southern Vipers | 37.0 | 16 | 14.93 | 4/23 | 0 |
| Heather Graham | The Blaze | 24.2 | 15 | 9.20 | 4/10 | 0 |

Source: ESPNCricinfo
