= Poppy Davies =

English cricketer

Personal information
- Full name: Poppy Louise Davies
- Born: 23 June 2000 (age 26)
- Batting: Right-handed
- Role: Wicket-keeper

Domestic team information
- Years: Team
- 2016–present: Staffordshire
- 2020–2024: Central Sparks

Career statistics
Competition	WLA	WT20
Matches	25	21
Runs scored	301	411
Batting average	15.05	22.83
100s/50s	0/1	0/1
Top score	67*	59
Catches/stumpings	11/6	2/5
- Source: CricketArchive, 16 October 2024

Poppy Louise Davies (born 23 June 2000) is an English cricketer who currently plays for Staffordshire. She plays as a wicket-keeper and right-handed batter.

== Domestic career ==
Davies made her county debut in 2016, for Staffordshire against Sussex. In 2017 she made her Twenty20 high score, scoring 48 against Worcestershire. The following season, Davies took 3 catches and made 3 stumpings in the 2018 Women's County Championship, as well as hitting her List A high score of 39. In 2019, she equalled her T20 high score, hitting 48 against Leicestershire, and overall hit 115 runs in the Twenty20 Cup, at an average of 57.50. Davies was Staffordshire's leading run-scorer in the 2021 Women's Twenty20 Cup, and broke her Twenty20 high score in a match against Somerset, in which she hit 59 from 49 deliveries. She scored 118 runs for the side in the 2022 Women's Twenty20 Cup, with a top score of 48.

In 2020, Davies played for Central Sparks in the Rachael Heyhoe Flint Trophy. She appeared in four matches, scoring 47 runs at an average of 23.50. Her best performance came against Northern Diamonds, where she hit 31* to bring her side to victory in a 6 wicket win. In 2021, she played one match for the side, in which she was dismissed without scoring. She was again in the side's squad in 2022 and 2023, but did not play a match in either season.
