= Georgia Davis =

English cricketer (born 1999)

Personal information
- Full name: Georgia Katie Davis
- Born: 3 June 1999 (age 27); Birmingham, England
- Batting: Right-handed
- Bowling: Right-arm off break
- Role: Bowler

International information
- National side: England
- ODI debut (cap 151): 9 September 2024 v Ireland
- Last ODI: 11 September 2024 v Ireland

Domestic team information
- Years: Team
- 2015–present: Warwickshire
- 2019: Yorkshire Diamonds
- 2020–2024: Central Sparks
- 2021–2022: Trent Rockets
- 2023–present: Welsh Fire

Career statistics
Competition	WODI	WLA	WT20
Matches	1	58	92
Runs scored	–	263	251
Batting average	–	8.48	13.94
100s/50s	–	0/1	0/0
Top score	–	52*	44*
Balls bowled	23	2,549	1,719
Wickets	2	89	107
Bowling average	9.50	18.29	14.42
5 wickets in innings	0	1	1
10 wickets in match	0	0	0
Best bowling	2/19	6/23	5/14
Catches/stumpings	0/–	12/–	14/–
- Source: CricketArchive, 16 October 2024

Georgia Katie Davis (born 3 June 1999) is an English cricketer who currently plays for Warwickshire and Welsh Fire. She plays as a right-arm off break bowler. She previously played for Central Sparks, as well as Yorkshire Diamonds in the Women's Cricket Super League and Trent Rockets in The Hundred.

== Early life ==
Davis was born on 3 June 1999 in Birmingham.

== Domestic career ==
Davis made her county debut in 2015, for Warwickshire against Surrey. In her first season, she took 7 wickets at an average of 12.14 in the 2015 Women's Twenty20 Cup. Over the following seasons, Davis was most effective for Warwickshire in the Twenty20 Cup, taking 11 wickets at an average of 11.09 in 2017 and 14 wickets at 10.42 in 2018. In 2019, she was Warwickshire's leading wicket-taker in the County Championship, taking 12 wickets including her List A best bowling of 4/18. She also helped her side to victory in the 2019 Women's Twenty20 Cup that season, taking 7 wickets in the tournament, including 3 in the deciding match against Lancashire. In the 2021 Women's Twenty20 Cup, Davis took 7 wickets at an average of 8.71. In the 2022 Women's Twenty20 Cup, Davis was the joint-second leading wicket-taker across the entire competition, with 13 wickets at an average of 10.75. Against Gloucestershire, she took 5/14 from her four overs, her maiden Twenty20 five-wicket haul.

Davis also played for Yorkshire Diamonds in the 2019 Women's Cricket Super League. She played two matches, but did not bat or bowl.

In 2020, Davis played for Central Sparks in the Rachael Heyhoe Flint Trophy. She appeared in two matches, taking four wickets at an average of 20.25, including taking 3/29 against North West Thunder. In 2021, she took nine wickets for the side in the Rachael Heyhoe Flint Trophy with an economy of just 3.80, as well as taking eight wickets in the Charlotte Edwards Cup, the most for her side. She also played for Trent Rockets in The Hundred, appearing in 5 matches and taking two wickets. In 2022, Davis played six matches for Central Sparks, all in the Rachael Heyhoe Flint Trophy, taking four wickets. She also played five matches for Trent Rockets in The Hundred, taking two wickets at an average of 18.50.

In January 2023, it was announced that Davis had signed her first professional contract with Central Sparks. That season, she was the leading wicket-taker in the Rachael Heyhoe Flint Trophy, with 27 wickets at an average of 14.77. She also took eight wickets at an average of 15.75 in the Charlotte Edwards Cup. She captained the side in one match in the absence of regular captain Evelyn Jones. She was signed by Welsh Fire for The Hundred, but did not play a match. In 2024, she played 17 matches for Central Sparks, across the Rachael Heyhoe Flint Trophy and the Charlotte Edwards Cup, with a best bowling of 6/23 in the Rachael Heyhoe Flint Trophy.

== International career ==
Davis made her England debut against Ireland in a One Day International at Stormont in Belfast on 9 September 2024, taking 2/19 in a 275 run win.
