= Eve Jones =

English cricketer (born 1992)

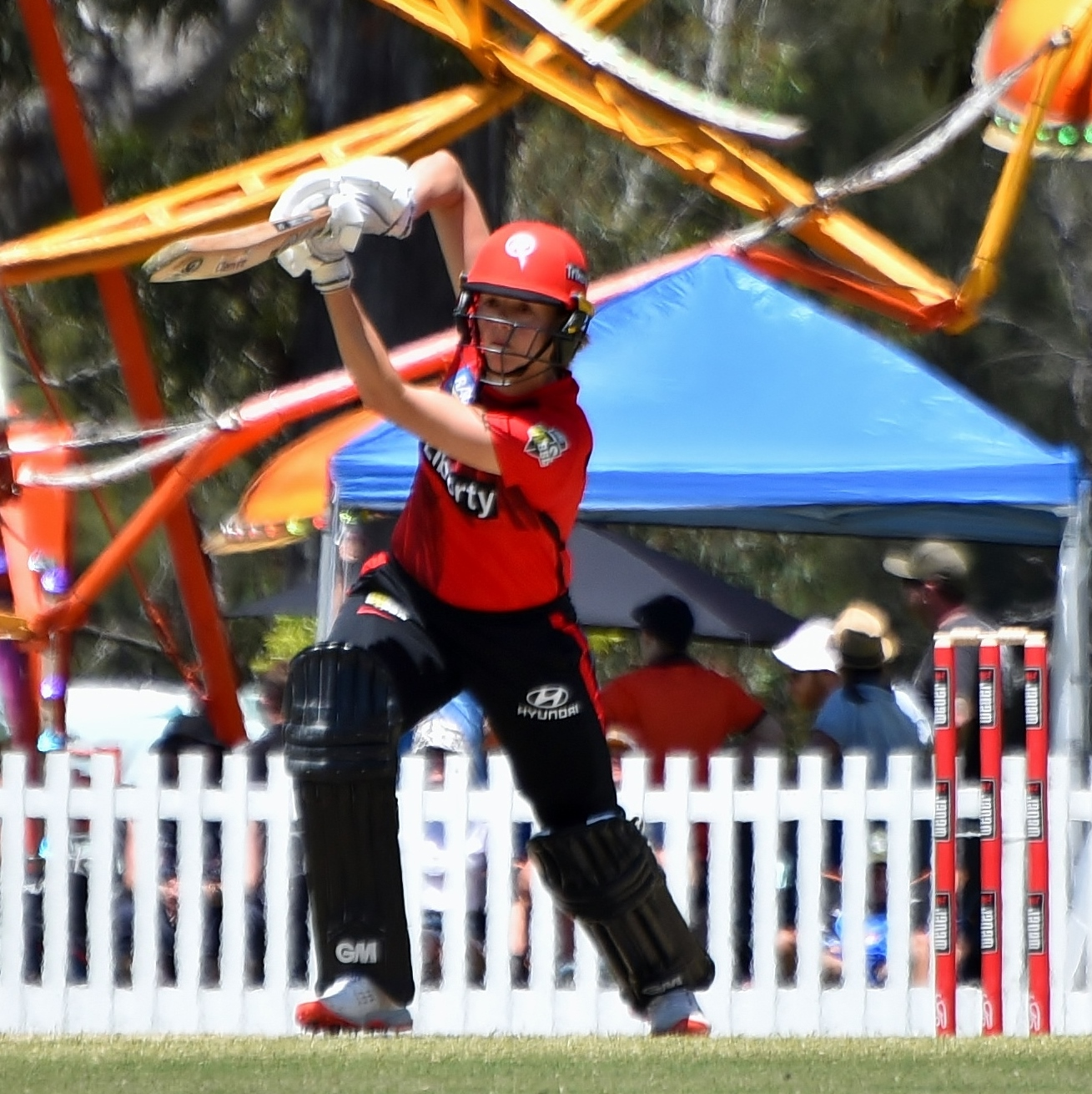
- Jones batting for Melbourne Renegades during WBBL|07

Personal information
- Full name: Evelyn Jones
- Born: 8 August 1992 (age 34); Shrewsbury, Shropshire, England
- Batting: Left-handed
- Bowling: Left-arm medium
- Role: Batter

Domestic team information
- Years: Team
- 2008–2011: Shropshire
- 2012–2016: Staffordshire
- 2016: Loughborough Lightning
- 2017–2019: Lancashire
- 2017–2019: Lancashire Thunder
- 2017/18: Canterbury
- 2020–2024: Warwickshire
- 2020–2024: Central Sparks
- 2024: → North West Thunder (on loan)
- 2021–2023: Birmingham Phoenix
- 2021/22–2022/23: Melbourne Renegades
- 2024–present: Manchester Originals

Career statistics
Competition	WLA	WT20
Matches	124	166
Runs scored	3,815	3,370
Batting average	36.68	23.73
100s/50s	7/22	0/14
Top score	136*	93*
Balls bowled	1,161	437
Wickets	26	19
Bowling average	30.15	24.52
5 wickets in innings	1	0
10 wickets in match	0	0
Best bowling	6/29	3/14
Catches/stumpings	46/–	44/–
- Source: CricketArchive, 16 October 2024

Evelyn Jones (born 8 August 1992) is an English cricketer who currently plays for Lancashire and Manchester Originals. She plays primarily as a left-handed opening batter, as well as bowling left-arm medium. She has previously played for Shropshire, Staffordshire, Warwickshire and Central Sparks, as well as for Loughborough Lightning and Lancashire Thunder in the Women's Cricket Super League, New Zealand side Canterbury Magicians and Women's Big Bash League team Melbourne Renegades.

At the end of the 2021 season, Jones was voted the PCA Player of the Year for her performances that year.

== Early life ==
Jones was born on 8 August 1992 in Shrewsbury, Shropshire. She has an ECB Level 3 coaching qualification, and has worked as a tutor.

== Domestic career ==
=== County cricket ===
Jones made her county debut in 2008, for Shropshire against Northamptonshire. Whilst her team lost the match, she top-scored for her side, scoring 50. Jones quickly became one of Shropshire's most successful players, and was their leading run-scorer in both their 2010 and 2011 County Championship seasons. She also achieved her best List A bowling figures in 2011, taking 6/29 against Northumberland.

Jones moved to Staffordshire ahead of the 2012 season. She was again successful at her new club, ending the 2014, 2015 and 2016 Championship seasons as Staffordshire's leading run-scorer. In 2015, she achieved her best List A score of 115*, and was the second leading run-scorer across the whole Championship. She was also captain of the side for the 2016 season.

In 2017, Jones moved to Lancashire, and was part of the side that won the double of the County Championship and Twenty20 Cup that season. Jones hit 35* in their crucial victory that secured the Championship title over Warwickshire. She became captain of the side the following season, and in 2019 lead them to 2nd in the County Championship.

In 2020, it was announced that Jones had signed for Warwickshire. She scored 135 runs for the side in the 2021 Women's Twenty20 Cup, including a high score of 66 made against Worcestershire. She played four matches for the side in the 2022 Women's Twenty20 Cup, scoring 137 runs at an average of 45.66. In a match against Somerset, Jones made her Twenty20 high score, 93* from 60 deliveries.

=== Regional cricket ===
Jones played in the Women's Cricket Super League, in 2016 for Loughborough Lightning and from 2017 to 2019 for Lancashire Thunder. Her best innings came in a 2018 match against Southern Vipers, in which she scored 69 in a 4 run victory. In 2020, she joined Central Sparks for the 2020 Rachael Heyhoe Flint Trophy, and was named as captain. She was her side's top run-scorer in the competition (and fourth across all teams), scoring 334 runs at an average of 66.80. She also equalled her List A career high score, scoring 115* in Sparks' final group game, against Lightning.

In 2021, Jones captained Sparks to the knockout stages of the Rachael Heyhoe Flint Trophy. She was also the third-highest run-scorer in the competition, with 299 runs including two half-centuries and one century, 100* made against North West Thunder. Jones was the leading run-scorer in the Charlotte Edwards Cup, with 276 runs including 3 half-centuries. She made her Twenty20 high score against South East Stars, scoring 76 from 68 deliveries. Jones also played for Birmingham Phoenix in The Hundred, and was the fourth-highest run-scorer in the competition, with 233 runs including two half-centuries. At the end of the 2021 season, Jones was named as the first-ever PCA Women's Overall Domestic MVP for her performances in the Rachael Heyhoe Flint Trophy, Charlotte Edwards Cup and The Hundred, and was later voted the overall PCA Player of the Year. In 2022, she scored 213 runs in the Charlotte Edwards Cup as she captained her side to the final, as well as scoring 224 runs in the Rachael Heyhoe Flint Trophy. Jones scored 91 in Sparks' defeat to Northern Diamonds in the Rachael Heyhoe Flint Trophy. She was also ever-present for Birmingham Phoenix in The Hundred, scoring 99 runs in six matches.

In 2023, she was the third-highest run-scorer in the Rachael Heyhoe Flint Trophy, with 440 runs at an average of 44.00, including four half-centuries. She was also again ever-present for Birmingham Phoenix in The Hundred, scoring 83 runs.

In 2024, she played 21 matches for Central Sparks, across the Rachael Heyhoe Flint Trophy and the Charlotte Edwards Cup, and scored 483 runs for the side in the Rachael Heyhoe Flint Trophy, including two centuries. On 31 August 2024, it was announced that Jones had gone on loan to North West Thunder for the remainder of the season.

=== Overseas cricket ===
Jones played one season for Canterbury in 2017–18, with her best performance coming against Wellington, where she scored 81. In September 2021, Jones signed for the Melbourne Renegades for the 2021–22 Women's Big Bash League season. She played 12 matches for the side, scoring 236 runs at an average of 23.60, including making 62 from 46 deliveries in the side's victory over Brisbane Heat. Ahead of the 2022–23 Women's Big Bash League season, Jones again signed for Melbourne Renegades, this time for the first two matches of the season as a replacement for Harmanpreet Kaur. This spell was later extended for a further two matches after Harmanpreet Kaur withdrew from the Big Bash, before Jones was replaced by Chamari Athapaththu. Overall, in her four matches for the side, she scored 24 runs at an average of 6.00.

== International career ==
In December 2021, Jones was named captain of England's A squad for their tour to Australia, with the matches being played alongside the Women's Ashes. She played all six matches on the tour, making one half-century, 51* in the 3rd T20.
