= Lloyd Tennant =

English cricketer (born 1968)

Personal information
- Full name: Lloyd Tennant
- Born: 9 April 1968 (age 58); Walsall, Staffordshire, England
- Batting: Right-handed
- Bowling: Right-arm medium-fast
- Role: Bowler

Domestic team information
- Years: Team
- 1986–1991: Leicestershire
- 1995: Staffordshire

Career statistics
Competition	FC	LA
Matches	10	16
Runs scored	110	44
Batting average	13.75	14.66
100s/50s	0/0	0/0
Top score	23*	17*
Balls bowled	798	540
Wickets	15	11
Bowling average	33.53	37.27
5 wickets in innings	0	0
10 wickets in match	0	0
Best bowling	4/54	3/25
Catches/stumpings	1/–	4/–
- Source: CricketArchive, 10 October 2021

Lloyd Tennant (born 9 April 1968) is an English former cricketer active from 1986 to 1995 who played for Leicestershire. He appeared in ten first-class matches as a right-handed batsman who bowled right-arm medium fast. In first-class cricket, he scored 110 runs with a highest score of 23* and took fifteen wickets with a best performance of four for 54.

In retirement, he served on the Leicestershire coaching staff until 2015. He proved successful in leading the club's 2nd XI. In 2017 he was appointed by the England and Wales Cricket Board as a cricket liaison officer. He was appointed as the head coach of Central Sparks in 2020.
