= 2021 Charlotte Edwards Cup =

English cricket season

- Dates: 26 June 2021 – 5 September 2021
- Administrator(s): ECB
- Cricket format: Twenty20
- Tournament format(s): Group stage and knockout
- Champions: South East Stars (1st title)
- Participants: 8
- Matches: 26
- Most runs: Evelyn Jones (276)
- Most wickets: Bryony Smith (14)
- Official website: ECB

The 2021 Charlotte Edwards Cup, initially named the 2021 Women's Regional T20, was the first edition of the Charlotte Edwards Cup, an English women's cricket Twenty20 domestic competition took place between 26 June and 5 September 2021. It featured eight teams playing in two double round-robin groups, followed by a Finals Day. South East Stars won the tournament, beating Northern Diamonds in the final. The tournament ran alongside the Rachael Heyhoe Flint Trophy.

== Background and format ==
With the ending of the Women's Cricket Super League in 2019, the England and Wales Cricket Board intended to launch a new regional structure for domestic women's cricket in England and Wales, including a 50-over competition, a Twenty20 competition and The Hundred. As the 2020 season was shortened due to the COVID-19 pandemic, the new Twenty20 competition was postponed, with only the Rachael Heyhoe Flint Trophy taking place. In February 2021, it was announced that the competition would begin that year, as the Women's Regional T20. In June 2021, the tournament was renamed the Charlotte Edwards Cup. Fixtures were played in two blocks, after the first half of the 2021 Rachael Heyhoe Flint Trophy and with a break in the middle for The Hundred.

The competition featured eight teams that represent regional hubs. Teams were divided into two groups, based on finishing positions in the 2020 Rachael Heyhoe Flint Trophy, and played each team in their group twice, home and away, with the two group winners and the best second-place team advancing to Finals Day. The best group winner advanced straight to the Final, whilst the other two teams played off in a semi-final.

== Teams ==
The teams were as follows:

- Central Sparks (representing Warwickshire, Worcestershire, Herefordshire, Shropshire and Staffordshire)
- Lightning (representing Loughborough University, Derbyshire, Leicestershire, Nottinghamshire and Lincolnshire)
- Northern Diamonds (representing Yorkshire, Durham and Northumberland)
- North West Thunder (representing Lancashire, Cheshire and Cumbria)
- South East Stars (representing Surrey and Kent)
- Southern Vipers (representing Hampshire, Sussex, Berkshire, Buckinghamshire, Dorset, Isle of Wight and Oxfordshire)
- Sunrisers (representing Middlesex, Essex, Northamptonshire, Bedfordshire, Cambridgeshire, Hertfordshire, Huntingdonshire, Norfolk and Suffolk)
- Western Storm (representing Glamorgan, Gloucestershire, Somerset, Cornwall, Devon, Wiltshire and Cricket Wales)

== Standings ==
Teams receive 4 points for a win. A bonus point will be given where the winning team's run rate is 1.25 or greater times that of the opposition. In case of a tie in the standings, the following tiebreakers will be applied in order: highest net run rate, team that scored the most points in matches involving the tied parties, better bowling strike rate, drawing of lots.

=== Group A ===
Pos	Team	Pld	W	L	T	NR	BP	Pts	NRR
1	South East Stars (Q)	6	5	1	0	0	1	21	1.050
2	Southern Vipers (Q)	6	4	2	0	0	3	19	0.875
3	Central Sparks	6	3	3	0	0	0	12	−0.669
4	Lightning	6	0	6	0	0	0	0	−1.139

Source: ESPN Cricinfo, BBC
(Q) Qualified for the phase indicated

=== Group B ===
Pos	Team	Pld	W	L	T	NR	BP	Pts	NRR
1	Northern Diamonds (Q)	6	4	2	0	0	1	17	0.655
2	Western Storm	6	4	2	0	0	1	17	0.182
3	North West Thunder	6	2	3	1	0	1	11	0.029
4	Sunrisers	6	1	4	1	0	0	6	−0.871

Source: ESPNCricinfo, BBC
(Q) Qualified for the phase indicated
- advanced to the final
- advanced to the semi-final

== Group stage ==
=== Group A ===
26 June 2021
11:00 BST
Scorecard

Lightning; 107 (19.1 overs)	v	South East Stars; 108/4 (13.1 overs)
Bethany Harmer 34 (25); Bryony Smith 4/15 (3.1 overs)		Bryony Smith 30 (14); Kathryn Bryce 2/26 (3 overs)

South East Stars won by 6 wickets
Trent Bridge, Nottingham
Umpires: Billy Taylor and Jasmine Naeem

- Lightning won the toss and elected to bat.
- Points: South East Stars 5, Lightning 0

26 June 2021
18:30 BST (D/N)
Scorecard

Central Sparks; 83 (17.5 overs)	v	Southern Vipers; 85/2 (13.1 overs)
Marie Kelly 36 (41); Charlie Dean 5/19 (3.5 overs)		Danni Wyatt 45 (33); Emily Arlott 1/13 (2 overs)

Southern Vipers won by 8 wickets
Edgbaston, Birmingham
Umpires: Anna Harris and Sarah Bartlett

- Southern Vipers won the toss and elected to field.
- Points: Southern Vipers 5, Central Sparks 0

3 July 2021
14:30 BST
Scorecard

Central Sparks; 117 (19 overs)	v	South East Stars; 118/5 (16.2 overs)
Evelyn Jones 49 (44); Alice Capsey 3/13 (3 overs)		Grace Gibbs 33* (27); Georgia Davis 3/21 (4 overs)

South East Stars won by 5 wickets
St Lawrence Ground, Canterbury
Umpires: Sarah Bartlett and Tom Lungley

- South East Stars won the toss and elected to field.
- Points: South East Stars 4, Central Sparks 0

3 July 2021
14:30 BST
Scorecard

Southern Vipers; 134/7 (20 overs)	v	Lightning; 88 (19.5 overs)
Georgia Adams 37 (38); Kathryn Bryce 2/15 (4 overs)		Sonia Odedra 16 (22); Michaela Kirk 16 (22); Tara Norris 4/14 (3.5 overs)

Southern Vipers won by 46 runs
Arundel Castle, Arundel
Umpires: Chris Watt and Sophie McLelland

- Lightning won the toss and elected to field.
- Points: Southern Vipers 5, Lightning 0

10 July 2021
14:30 BST
Scorecard

Lightning; 81 (19.1 overs)	v	Central Sparks; 84/4 (19 overs)
Sophie Munro 20* (16); Georgia Davis 4/12 (4 overs)		Gwenan Davies 31 (49); Sophie Munro 2/10 (3 overs)

Central Sparks won by 6 wickets
Grace Road, Leicester
Umpires: James Middlebrook and Lina Nenova

- Lightning won the toss and elected to bat.
- Points: Central Sparks 4, Lightning 0

10 July 2021
14:30 BST
Scorecard

South East Stars; 127/7 (20 overs)	v	Southern Vipers; 130/3 (15.4 overs)
Kira Chathli 30 (20); Charlotte Taylor 3/12 (4 overs)		Maia Bouchier 53* (43); Bryony Smith 2/26 (3.4 overs)

Southern Vipers won by 7 wickets
County Cricket Ground, Beckenham
Umpires: Jasmine Naeem and Mark Newell

- Southern Vipers won the toss and elected to field.
- Points: Southern Vipers 5, South East Stars 0

25 August 2021
14:30 BST
Scorecard

South East Stars; 175/6 (20 overs)	v	Lightning; 147/7 (20 overs)
Alice Davidson-Richards 41* (25); Sonia Odedra 2/20 (4 overs)		Abigail Freeborn 61 (50); Bryony Smith 2/18 (4 overs)

South East Stars won by 28 runs
Woodbridge Road, Guildford
Umpires: Joanne Ibbotson and Billy Taylor

- Lightning won the toss and elected to field.
- Points: South East Stars 4, Lightning 0

25 August 2021
14:30 BST
Scorecard

Southern Vipers; 162/4 (20 overs)	v	Central Sparks; 163/4 (19 overs)
Georgia Adams 88* (60); Issy Wong 1/20 (4 overs)		Marie Kelly 100* (53); Charlotte Taylor 2/36 (4 overs)

Central Sparks won by 6 wickets
County Cricket Ground, Hove
Umpires: Ben Debenham and Jasmine Naeem

- Central Sparks won the toss and elected to field.
- Points: Central Sparks 4, Southern Vipers 0

28 August 2021
14:30 BST
Scorecard

Lightning; 136/8 (20 overs)	v	Central Sparks; 139/6 (19.5 overs)
Abigail Freeborn 32 (33); Emily Arlott 2/13 (3 overs)		Evelyn Jones 71 (55); Sonia Odedra 2/14 (4 overs)

Central Sparks won by 4 wickets
New Road, Worcester
Umpires: Paul Pollard and Jane Pratt

- Central Sparks won the toss and elected to field.
- Points: Central Sparks 4, Lightning 0

28 August 2021
14:30 BST
Scorecard

South East Stars; 167/4 (20 overs)	v	Southern Vipers; 147/7 (20 overs)
Alice Capsey 61 (46); Georgia Adams 1/16 (2 overs)		Georgia Elwiss 45 (33); Alice Capsey 2/9 (2 overs)

South East Stars won by 20 runs
Rose Bowl, Southampton
Umpires: Sarah Bartlett and Anna Harris

- Southern Vipers won the toss and elected to field.
- Points: South East Stars 4, Southern Vipers 0

30 August 2021
12:00 BST
Scorecard

South East Stars; 165/6 (20 overs)	v	Central Sparks; 139/6 (20 overs)
Emma Jones 46* (27); Clare Boycott 3/22 (3 overs)		Evelyn Jones 76 (68); Danielle Gregory 3/16 (4 overs)

South East Stars won by 26 runs
Edgbaston Foundation Ground, Birmingham
Umpires: Anna Harris and Graham Lloyd

- Central Sparks won the toss and elected to field.
- Points: South East Stars 4, Central Sparks 0

30 August 2021
14:30 BST
Scorecard

Lightning; 124/9 (20 overs)	v	Southern Vipers; 125/3 (20 overs)
Abigail Freeborn 27 (29); Tara Norris 3/26 (4 overs)		Paige Scholfield 41* (36); Kirstie Gordon 2/20 (4 overs)

Southern Vipers won by 7 wickets
County Cricket Ground, Derby
Umpires: Grace Bambury and Sue Redfern

- Lightning won the toss and elected to bat.
- Points: Southern Vipers 4, Lightning 0

=== Group B ===
26 June 2021
14:30 BST
Scorecard

North West Thunder; 118/6 (20 overs)	v	Northern Diamonds; 106/9 (20 overs)
Emma Lamb 58 (43); Beth Langston 2/32 (4 overs)		Sterre Kalis 32 (37); Emma Lamb 4/13 (4 overs)

North West Thunder won by 12 runs
Headingley, Leeds
Umpires: James Middlebrook and Lina Nenova

- North West Thunder won the toss and elected to bat.
- Points: North West Thunder 4, Northern Diamonds 0

26 June 2021
14:30 BST
Scorecard

Western Storm; 129/6 (20 overs)	v	Sunrisers; 133/3 (17.5 overs)
Nat Wraith 36* (24); Sonali Patel 2/26 (4 overs)		Mady Villiers 36 (26); Danielle Gibson 1/20 (3 overs)

Sunrisers won by 7 wickets
County Ground, Taunton
Umpires: Mark Newell and Yvonne Dolphin-Cooper

- Sunrisers won the toss and elected to field.
- Points: Sunrisers 4, Western Storm 0

2 July 2021
19:00 BST (D/N)
Scorecard

Sunrisers; 116/7 (20 overs)	v	Northern Diamonds; 117/2 (16.2 overs)
Jo Gardner 42 (30); Jenny Gunn 3/25 (4 overs)		Leah Dobson 44* (52); Mady Villiers 1/22 (3 overs)

Northern Diamonds won by 8 wickets
County Ground, Chelmsford
Umpires: Joanne Ibbotson and Sophie McLelland

- Northern Diamonds won the toss and elected to field.
- Points: Northern Diamonds 4, Sunrisers 0

4 July 2021
11:00 BST
Scorecard

North West Thunder; 110/8 (20 overs)	v	Western Storm; 36/1 (3.1 overs)
Emma Lamb 21 (19); Lauren Parfitt 2/15 (4 overs)		Fi Morris 19 (8); Emma Lamb 1/11 (1 over)

Western Storm won by 9 wickets (DLS)
Boughton Hall Cricket Club Ground, Chester
Umpires: Anna Harris and Jasmine Naeem

- North West Thunder won the toss and elected to bat.
- Western Storm were set a revised target of 33 runs from 5 overs due to rain.
- Points: Western Storm 5, North West Thunder 0

9 July 2021
14:30 BST
Scorecard

North West Thunder; 186/1 (20 overs)	v	Sunrisers; 115 (20 overs)
Emma Lamb 111* (61); Gayatri Gole 1/37 (4 overs)		Cordelia Griffith 34 (33); Emma Lamb 3/16 (4 overs)

North West Thunder won by 71 runs
Old Trafford, Manchester
Umpires: Joanne Ibbotson and Neil Pratt

- Sunrisers won the toss and elected to field.
- Points: North West Thunder 5, Sunrisers 0
- Emma Lamb (North West Thunder) became the first player to score a century in the Charlotte Edwards Cup.

10 July 2021
14:30 BST
Scorecard

Western Storm; 106/9 (20 overs)	v	Northern Diamonds; 110/9 (20 overs)
Katie George 21 (23); Alex MacDonald 4/17 (4 overs)		Jenny Gunn 27* (21); Danielle Gibson 2/9 (4 overs)

Northern Diamonds won by 1 wicket
County Ground, Taunton
Umpires: Anna Harris and Chris Watts

- Northern Diamonds won the toss and elected to field.
- Points: Northern Diamonds 4, Western Storm 0

25 August 2021
14:30 BST
Scorecard

Northern Diamonds; 120/6 (20 overs)	v	Sunrisers; 101/7 (20 overs)
Beth Langston 40 (35); Kate Coppack 2/10 (4 overs)		Jo Gardner 31 (29); Alex MacDonald 2/11 (4 overs)

Northern Diamonds won by 19 runs
South Northumberland Cricket Club, Gosforth
Umpires: Paul Pollard and Jane Pratt

- Sunrisers won the toss and elected to field.
- Points: Northern Diamonds 4, Sunrisers 0

25 August 2021
14:30 BST
Scorecard

North West Thunder; 100/9 (20 overs)	v	Western Storm; 101/3 (17.4 overs)
Emma Lamb 28 (20); Nicole Harvey 3/13 (4 overs)		Katie George 47* (46); Hannah Jones 1/22 (4 overs); Alex Hartley 1/22 (4 overs)

Western Storm won by 7 wickets
Sophia Gardens, Cardiff
Umpires: Anna Harris and Sue Redfern

- Western Storm won the toss and elected to field.
- Points: Western Storm 4, North West Thunder 0

28 August 2021
14:30 BST
Scorecard

Northern Diamonds; 110/9 (20 overs)	v	Western Storm; 111/6 (19.3 overs)
Alex MacDonald 22 (20); Nicole Harvey 2/20 (4 overs)		Sophie Luff 60* (54); Rachel Slater 2/16 (3 overs)

Western Storm won by 4 wickets
Riverside Ground, Chester-le-Street
Umpires: Jasmine Naeem and Neil Pratt

- Western Storm won the toss and elected to field.
- Points: Western Storm 4, Northern Diamonds 0

28 August 2021
14:30 BST
Scorecard

North West Thunder; 124/5 (20 overs)	v	Sunrisers; 124/4 (20 overs)
Georgie Boyce 31 (27); Emily Thorpe 2/17 (4 overs)		Cordelia Griffith 63 (51); Kate Cross 2/20 (4 overs)

Match tied
County Ground, Northampton
Umpires: Hassan Adnan and Sue Redfern

- North West Thunder won the toss and elected to bat.
- Points: North West Thunder 2, Sunrisers 2

30 August 2021
14:30 BST
Scorecard

Western Storm; 147/5 (20 overs)	v	Sunrisers; 142/7 (20 overs)
Georgia Hennessy 62 (62); Grace Scrivens 2/23 (4 overs)		Cordelia Griffith 32 (25); Nicole Harvey 3/17 (4 overs)

Western Storm won by 5 runs
Fenner's, Cambridge
Umpires: Sarah Bartlett and Martin Saggers

- Sunrisers won the toss and elected to field.
- Points: Western Storm 4, Sunrisers 0

30 August 2021
14:30 BST
Scorecard

North West Thunder; 90/9 (20 overs)	v	Northern Diamonds; 92/2 (12.2 overs)
Danielle Collins 16 (25); Jenny Gunn 4/15 (4 overs)		Bess Heath 58* (40); Alice Dyson 1/9 (1 over)

Northern Diamonds won by 8 wickets
Boughton Hall Cricket Club Ground, Chester
Umpires: Jasmine Naeem and Billy Taylor

- Northern Diamonds won the toss and elected to field.
- Points: Northern Diamonds 5, North West Thunder 0

== Finals Day ==
Semi-Final			Final
			A1	South East Stars	139/5
A2	Southern Vipers	117	B1	Northern Diamonds	138/4
B1	Northern Diamonds	135/6

=== Semi-final ===
5 September 2021
12:00 BST
Scorecard

Northern Diamonds; 135/6 (20 overs)	v	Southern Vipers; 117 (20 overs)
Lauren Winfield-Hill 65 (49); Lauren Bell 1/15 (4 overs)		Emily Windsor 32 (36); Jenny Gunn 4/26 (4 overs)

Northern Diamonds won by 18 runs
Rose Bowl, Southampton
Umpires: Anna Harris and Sue Redfern
Player of the match: Lauren Winfield-Hill (Northern Diamonds)

- Northern Diamonds won the toss and elected to bat.

=== Final ===
5 September 2021
16:00 BST
Scorecard

Northern Diamonds; 138/4 (20 overs)	v	South East Stars; 139/5 (18 overs)
Hollie Armitage 59* (48); Grace Gibbs 1/13 (2 overs)		Alice Capsey 40* (26); Katie Levick 2/19 (4 overs)

South East Stars won by 5 wickets
Rose Bowl, Southampton
Umpires: Sarah Bartlett and Sue Redfern
Player of the match: Alice Capsey (South East Stars)

- Northern Diamonds won the toss and elected to bat.

== Statistics ==
- Highest score by a team: North West Thunder – 186/1 (20 overs) v Sunrisers (9 July).
- Top score by an individual: Emma Lamb – 111* (61) v Sunrisers (9 July).
- Best bowling figures by an individual: Charlie Dean – 5/19 (3.5 overs) v Central Sparks (26 June).

=== Most runs ===
Player	Team	Matches	Innings	Runs	Average	HS	100s	50s
Evelyn Jones	Central Sparks	6	6	276	55.20	76	0	3
Emma Lamb	North West Thunder	4	4	218	72.66	111*	1	1
Georgia Adams	Southern Vipers	7	7	215	35.83	88*	0	2
Alice Capsey	South East Stars	6	6	203	40.60	61	0	1
Marie Kelly	Central Sparks	6	6	170	34.00	100*	1	0

Source: ESPNCricinfo

=== Most wickets ===
Player	Team	Overs	Wickets	Average	BBI	5w
Bryony Smith	South East Stars	25.5	14	9.85	4/15	0
Jenny Gunn	Northern Diamonds	28.3	13	12.69	4/15	0
Tara Norris	Southern Vipers	25.5	13	13.30	4/14	0
Nicole Harvey	Western Storm	24.0	12	9.41	3/13	0
Katie Levick	Northern Diamonds	30.0	10	15.30	2/19	0

Source: ESPNCricinfo
