= Em Arlott =

English cricketer

Personal information
- Full name: Emily Louise Arlott
- Born: 23 February 1998 (age 28); King's Lynn, Norfolk, England
- Batting: Right-handed
- Bowling: Right-arm medium
- Role: Bowler

International information
- National side: England
- ODI debut (cap 152): 30 May 2025 v West Indies
- Last ODI: 7 June 2025 v West Indies
- ODI shirt no.: 37
- T20I debut (cap 68): 21 May 2025 v West Indies
- Last T20I: 23 May 2025 v West Indies
- T20I shirt no.: 37

Domestic team information
- Years: Team
- 2013–2024: Worcestershire
- 2020–2024: Central Sparks
- 2021–present: London Spirit

Career statistics
| Competition | WLA | WT20 |
|---|---|---|
| Matches | 75 | 104 |
| Runs scored | 557 | 939 |
| Batting average | 10.50 | 17.71 |
| 100s/50s | 0/1 | 0/1 |
| Top score | 63 | 54 |
| Balls bowled | 2,873 | 1,754 |
| Wickets | 75 | 96 |
| Bowling average | 27.62 | 19.97 |
| 5 wickets in innings | 1 | 0 |
| 10 wickets in match | 0 | 0 |
| Best bowling | 5/29 | 4/21 |
| Catches/stumpings | 33/– | 25/– |
- Source: CricketArchive, 16 October 2024

Emily Louise Arlott (born 23 February 1998) is an English cricketer who currently plays for Warwickshire and Birmingham Phoenix. She plays primarily as a right-arm medium-fast bowler. In June 2021, Arlott received her maiden call-up to the England women's cricket team, ahead of their home series against India.

== Early life ==
Arlott was born on 23 February 1998 in King's Lynn, Norfolk. She has worked as a Cricket Community Coach.

== Domestic career ==
Arlott made her county debut in 2013, for Worcestershire against Durham, taking one wicket in a 30 run victory. Arlott was a regular in Worcestershire's team in subsequent seasons, and was her side's joint-leading wicket-taker in the 2015 Women's County Championship, taking 8 wickets at an average of 32.62.

2019 was a breakthrough year for Arlott, taking 19 wickets for Worcestershire across both formats after recovering from an ankle injury during the off-season. She was her side's joint-leading wicket-taker in the County Championship, with 12 wickets taken at an average of 18.66 (including her List A best bowling of 4/25). She was subsequently named as Worcestershire's Players' Player of the Year. She took five wickets for the side in the 2022 Women's Twenty20 Cup, at an average of 25.50.

In 2020, Arlott played for the Central Sparks in the Rachael Heyhoe Flint Trophy. She took three wickets across the six matches she played. In December 2020, it was announced that Arlott was one of the 41 female cricketers that had signed a full-time domestic contract. In 2021, she took 11 wickets for the Sparks in the Rachael Heyhoe Flint Trophy, including her List A best bowling figures and maiden five-wicket haul of 5/29 against Southern Vipers, which included a hat-trick. In the Charlotte Edwards Cup, Arlott took 3 wickets at an average of 33.33. She also played for Birmingham Phoenix in The Hundred, taking 6 wickets at an average of 25.00. At the end of the season, Arlott was named in the first ever PCA Women's Team of the Year. She played 12 matches for Central Sparks in 2022, across the Charlotte Edwards Cup and the Rachael Heyhoe Flint Trophy, taking 15 wickets. She scored her maiden List A half-century in the Rachael Heyhoe Flint Trophy, scoring 63 against Sunrisers. She also played for Birmingham Phoenix in The Hundred, and was the side's leading wicket-taker, with 9 wickets at an average of 11.11.

In 2023, she played 12 matches for Central Sparks, across the Rachael Heyhoe Flint Trophy and the Charlotte Edwards Cup, taking 17 wickets, including taking 4/23 in a Charlotte Edwards Cup match against Sunrisers. She also played seven matches for Birmingham Phoenix in The Hundred, taking seven wickets at an average of 16.85. In 2024, she played 20 matches for Central Sparks, across the Rachael Heyhoe Flint Trophy and the Charlotte Edwards Cup, taking 23 wickets.

== International career ==
In June 2021, Arlott was named as in England's Test squad for their one-off match against India. Later the same month, Arlott was also named in England's Women's One Day International (WODI) squad, also for their series against India. In December 2021, Arlott was named in England's A squad for their tour to Australia, with the matches being played alongside the Women's Ashes. She played two matches on the tour, taking one wicket.

In June 2022, Arlott was named in England's Women's Test squad for their one-off match against South Africa. However, she was later ruled out of the Test match after she did not recover from COVID-19.
