= Western Storm =

Women's cricket team

Team information
- Colours: Green
- Established: 2016; 10 years ago
- Home ground: County Ground, Taunton; County Ground, Bristol; Sophia Gardens; College Ground, Cheltenham

History
- WCSL wins: 2
- RHFT wins: 0
- CEC wins: 0
- Official website: Western Storm
Playing kit

Western Storm were a women's cricket team that represented South West England and Wales, one of eight regional hubs in English domestic cricket. They primarily played their home matches at the County Ground, Taunton, the County Ground, Bristol and Sophia Gardens. They were captained by Sophie Luff and coached by Trevor Griffin. The team were partnered with Somerset, Gloucestershire, Glamorgan, Devon, Cornwall, Wiltshire and Cricket Wales. Originally formed to compete in the Women's Cricket Super League in 2016, Western Storm won the competition twice, in 2017 and 2019. When women's cricket in England was reformed in 2020, the Western Storm brand was retained, and they competed in the Rachael Heyhoe Flint Trophy and the Charlotte Edwards Cup.

At the end of the 2024 season, following reforms to the structure of women's domestic cricket, the team was effectively replaced by a professionalised Somerset team.

== History ==
=== 2016–2019: Women's Cricket Super League ===
Western Storm were formed in 2016 to compete in the new Women's Cricket Super League, representing the South West. In their inaugural season, they came second in the group stage, meaning they progressed to the semi-final, which they won against Loughborough Lightning. However, they lost in the final by seven wickets to the Southern Vipers. One of Western Storm's overseas players, Stafanie Taylor, was both the leading run-scorer and leading wicket-taker, and was subsequently named player of the tournament.

In 2017, Western Storm finished third in the group stage, again progressing to the semi-final, which they won against the Surrey Stars. In a rematch against the Southern Vipers, this time the Storm emerged victorious, winning by seven wickets and claiming their first WCSL title. Western Storm overseas player Rachel Priest scored 72 in the final, and was the tournament's leading run-scorer. In 2018, Western Storm again reached finals day, finishing third in the group stage, but were defeated by the Surrey Stars in the semi-final. Storm's Smriti Mandhana was the leading run-scorer and player of the tournament.

In the final season of the WCSL, 2019, Western Storm won 9 out of their 10 group stage games, topping the group and progressing straight to the final for the first time. There, they faced Southern Vipers in a repeat of the first ever WCSL final. Chasing 173 to win, Storm captain Heather Knight scored 78* as her side were victorious with an over to spare. Western Storm therefore ended the WCSL as the most successful team, with two title wins. Bowler Freya Davies was the leading wicket-taker in the tournament.

=== 2020–2024: Domestic Regional Hub ===
In 2020, women's cricket in England was restructured, creating eight new 'regional hub' teams, with the intention of playing both 50-over and 20-over cricket. The Western Storm brand was retained after this restructuring, with some differences to the squad and coaching staff. Sophie Luff was named as captain of the side, whilst Mark O'Leary became the coach. Due to the COVID-19 pandemic, the 2020 season was truncated, and only 50-over cricket was played, in the Rachael Heyhoe Flint Trophy. Western Storm won 4 of their 6 games, finishing second in the South Group and therefore failing to progress to the final. At the end of the season, six Storm players were given full-time domestic contracts, the first of their kind in England: Sophie Luff, Danielle Gibson, Fi Morris, Georgia Hennessy, Nat Wraith and Alex Griffiths.

The following season, 2021, Western Storm competed in both the Rachael Heyhoe Flint Trophy and the newly-formed Twenty20 competition, the Charlotte Edwards Cup. In the Rachael Heyhoe Flint Trophy the side finished sixth out of eight teams, winning three of their seven matches, including a one-wicket victory in their opening match against North West Thunder. Storm captain Sophie Luff was the leading run-scorer across the whole tournament with 417 runs, including 157* made in the final match against Sunrisers. In the Charlotte Edwards Cup, Storm narrowly missed out on qualifying for Finals Day on Net Run Rate, finishing second in Group B with four wins from their six matches. Storm bowler Nicole Harvey was the fourth-highest wicket-taker in the tournament, with 12 wickets at an average of 9.41.

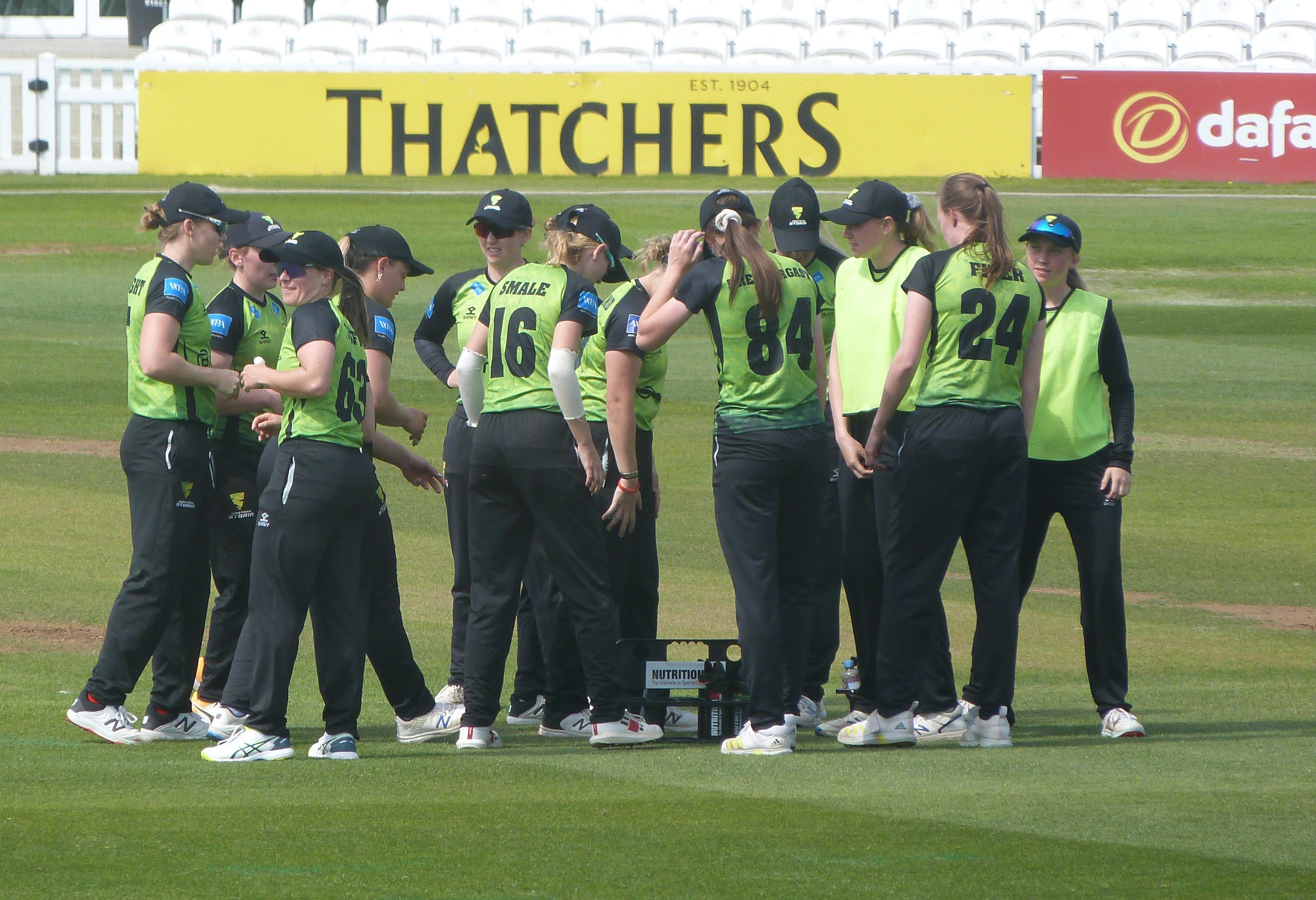
Western Storm celebrate a wicket against North West Thunder in May 2023.

Ahead of the 2022 season, it was announced that O'Leary was stepping down from his role as Head Coach. Dan Helesfay was appointed as interim Head Coach for the Charlotte Edwards Cup campaign, with Trevor Griffin, who had coached the side between 2017 and 2019, returning to the club to take the role on a permanent basis ahead of the Rachael Heyhoe Flint Trophy. The side finished third in their group in the Charlotte Edwards Cup, with three wins from their six matches. They finished fourth in the group of eight in the Rachael Heyhoe Flint Trophy, winning three of their matches. In 2023, they finished sixth out of eight in the Charlotte Edwards Cup and bottom of the group in the Rachael Heyhoe Flint Trophy. In 2024, the side finished seventh in the Charlotte Edwards Cup and eighth in the Rachael Heyhoe Flint Trophy.

2024 was the side's final season, with reforms to the structure of domestic cricket in England meaning that the side was effectively replaced by a professionalised Somerset team.

== Home grounds ==
Venue	Games hosted by season									
Venue	16	17	18	19	20	21	22	23	24	Total
County Ground, Taunton	2	1	3	3	–	3	2	4	5	23
County Ground, Bristol	1	1	1	2	3	3	2	3	3	19
College Ground, Cheltenham	–	–	1	–	–	–	1	1	2	5
Sophia Gardens	–	–	–	–	–	1	1	2	2	6
Millfield School	–	–	–	–	–	–	–	1	–	1

== Players ==
=== Overseas Players ===
- Lizelle Lee – South Africa (2016)
- (Cricket West Indies) Stafanie Taylor – West Indies (2016–2018)
- Rachel Priest – New Zealand (2016–2019)
- Holly Huddleston – New Zealand (2017)
- Smriti Mandhana – India (2018–2019)
- Deepti Sharma – India (2019)
- Orla Prendergast – Ireland (2023)
- Piepa Cleary – Australia (2023)
- Amanda-Jade Wellington – Australia (2024)

== Seasons ==
=== Women's Cricket Super League ===
Season	Final standing	League standings									Notes
Season	Final standing	P	W	L	T	NR	BP	Pts	NRR	Pos	Notes
2016	Runners-up	5	4	1	0	0	1	9	+0.838	2nd	Lost to Southern Vipers in the final
2017	Champions	5	3	2	0	0	0	12	–0.887	3rd	Won against Southern Vipers in the final
2018	Losing semi-finalists: 3rd	10	6	3	0	1	4	30	+0.919	2nd	Lost to Surrey Stars in the semi-final
2019	Champions	10	9	1	0	0	3	39	+1.109	1st	Won against Southern Vipers in the final

=== Rachael Heyhoe Flint Trophy ===
Season	Final standing	League standings									Notes
Season	Final standing	P	W	L	T	NR	BP	Pts	NRR	Pos	Notes
2020	Group stage	6	4	2	0	0	2	18	+0.51	2nd	DNQ
2021	Group stage	7	3	4	0	0	1	13	–0.46	6th	DNQ
2022	Group stage	7	3	3	0	1	1	15	–0.21	4th	DNQ
2023	Group stage	14	2	8	0	4	0	16	–1.07	8th	DNQ
2024	Group stage	14	4	10	0	0	2	18	–0.21	8th	DNQ

=== Charlotte Edwards Cup ===
Season	Final standing	League standings									Notes
Season	Final standing	P	W	L	T	NR	BP	Pts	NRR	Pos	Notes
2021	Group stage	6	4	2	0	0	1	17	+0.182	2nd	DNQ
2022	Group stage	6	3	3	0	0	1	13	+0.148	3rd	DNQ
2023	Group stage	7	3	4	0	0	0	12	–0.512	6th	DNQ
2024	Group stage	10	2	6	0	2	1	13	–0.659	7th	DNQ

== Statistics ==
=== Women's Cricket Super League ===
Women's Cricket Super League - summary of results
Year	Played	Wins	Losses	Tied	NR	Win %
2016	7	5	2	0	0	71.43
2017	7	5	2	0	0	71.43
2018	11	6	4	0	1	54.54
2019	11	10	1	0	0	90.90
Total	36	26	9	0	1	72.22

- Abandoned matches are counted as NR (no result)
- Win or loss by super over or boundary count are counted as tied.

Women's Cricket Super League - teamwise result summary
Opposition	Mat	Won	Lost	Tied	NR	Win %
Lancashire Thunder	6	6	0	0	0	100.00
Loughborough Lightning	7	5	2	0	0	71.43
Southern Vipers	9	6	2	0	1	66.66
Surrey Stars	8	4	4	0	0	50.00
Yorkshire Diamonds	6	5	1	0	0	83.33

=== Rachael Heyhoe Flint Trophy ===
Rachael Heyhoe Flint Trophy - summary of results
Year	Played	Wins	Losses	Tied	NR	Win %
2020	6	4	2	0	0	66.67
2021	7	3	4	0	0	42.86
2022	7	3	3	0	1	42.86
2023	14	2	8	0	4	14.29
2024	14	4	10	0	0	28.57
Total	48	16	27	0	5	33.33

- Abandoned matches are counted as NR (no result)
- Win or loss by super over or boundary count are counted as tied.

Rachael Heyhoe Flint Trophy - teamwise result summary
Opposition	Mat	Won	Lost	Tied	NR	Win %
Central Sparks	6	1	4	0	1	16.67
Northern Diamonds	6	0	6	0	0	0.00
North West Thunder	6	4	2	0	0	66.67
Southern Vipers	8	0	6	0	2	0.00
South East Stars	8	3	4	0	1	37.50
Sunrisers	8	6	2	0	0	75.00
The Blaze	6	2	3	0	1	40.00

=== Charlotte Edwards Cup ===
Charlotte Edwards Cup - summary of results
Year	Played	Wins	Losses	Tied	NR	Win %
2021	6	4	2	0	0	66.67
2022	6	3	3	0	0	50.00
2023	7	3	4	0	0	42.86
2024	10	2	6	0	2	20.00
Total	29	12	15	0	2	41.38

- Abandoned matches are counted as NR (no result)
- Win or loss by super over or boundary count are counted as tied.

Charlotte Edwards Cup - teamwise result summary
Opposition	Mat	Won	Lost	Tied	NR	Win %
Central Sparks	4	2	2	0	0	50.00
Northern Diamonds	4	1	3	0	0	25.00
North West Thunder	4	3	0	0	1	75.00
South East Stars	5	0	4	0	1	0.00
Southern Vipers	3	0	3	0	0	0.00
Sunrisers	7	6	1	0	0	85.71
The Blaze	2	0	2	0	0	0.00

== Records ==
=== Women's Cricket Super League ===
- Highest team total: 185/4, v Lancashire Thunder on 9 August 2018.
- Lowest team total: 70, v Southern Vipers on 10 August 2017.
- Highest individual score: 106*, Rachel Priest v Yorkshire Diamonds on 20 August 2017.
- Best individual bowling analysis: 5/23, Anya Shrubsole v Yorkshire Diamonds on 14 August 2016.
- Most runs: 1,062 in 36 matches, Heather Knight.
- Most wickets: 37 wickets in 36 matches, Freya Davies.

=== Rachael Heyhoe Flint Trophy ===
- Highest team total: 313/4, v Sunrisers on 18 September 2021.
- Lowest (completed) team total: 89, v South East Stars on 1 May 2023.
- Highest individual score: 157*, Sophie Luff v Sunrisers on 18 September 2021.
- Best individual bowling analysis: 5/26, Fi Morris v Sunrisers on 5 September 2020.
- Most runs: 1,769 runs in 43 matches, Sophie Luff.
- Most wickets: 41 wickets in 34 matches, Chloe Skelton.

=== Charlotte Edwards Cup ===
- Highest team total: 186/8, v Northern Diamonds on 19 May 2023.
- Lowest (completed) team total: 99, v The Blaze on 7 June 2024.
- Highest individual score: 78, Sophie Luff v Sunrisers on 29 May 2022.
- Best individual bowling analysis: 4/9, Ellie Anderson v Sunrisers on 31 May 2024.
- Most runs: 565 runs in 28 matches, Sophie Luff.
- Most wickets: 23 wickets in 20 matches, Danielle Gibson.

== Honours ==
- Women's Cricket Super League:
  - Champions (2) – 2017, 2019

== See also ==
- Devon Women cricket team
- Dorset Women cricket team
- Somerset Women cricket team
- Gloucestershire Women cricket team
- Wales national women's cricket team
- Wiltshire Women cricket team
