= Southern Vipers =

Women's cricket team that represent the South of England

Team information
- Colours: Orange
- Founded: 2016
- Home ground: Rose Bowl; County Cricket Ground, Hove; Arundel Castle Cricket Ground; Sir Paul Getty's Ground; Falkland Cricket Club

History
- WCSL wins: 1
- RHFT wins: 3
- CEC wins: 2
- Official website: Southern Vipers
Playing kit

The Southern Vipers were a women's cricket team that represented the South of England. The Vipers wore an orange and black kit and primarily played their home matches at the Rose Bowl and the County Ground, Hove.

They were coached by former England captain Charlotte Edwards. Southern Vipers were partnered with Hampshire, Sussex, Berkshire, Buckinghamshire, Dorset, Oxfordshire and the Isle of Wight Cricket Board.

The Vipers were originally formed in 2016 to compete in the Women's Cricket Super League, and won the inaugural competition, winning all but one of their group games, and then defeating Western Storm at the finals day held at Chelmsford by 7 wickets. In 2020, women's cricket in England was reformed, but the Southern Vipers brand was retained, and they won the first two editions of the 50-over Rachael Heyhoe Flint Trophy, beating Northern Diamonds in the final both times. They won their first Charlotte Edwards Cup in 2022, beating Central Sparks in the final, before retaining their title the following year, beating The Blaze in the final. After losing in the final of the Rachael Heyhoe Flint Trophy in 2022, they won the tournament for the third time in 2023.

At the end of the 2024 season, following reforms to the structure of women's domestic cricket, the team was effectively replaced by a professionalised Hampshire team.

== History ==
=== 2016–2019: Women's Cricket Super League ===
Southern Vipers were formed in 2016 to compete in the new Women's Cricket Super League, partnering with Hampshire CCC, Sussex CCC and various cricket boards across South England. In their inaugural season, they topped the group stage, winning four of their five games, progressing straight to the final. In the final, the Vipers faced Western Storm, who they beat by 7 wickets to claim the inaugural WCSL title.

2017 saw continued success for Southern Vipers, as they again topped the group stage, with four wins. In the final, they faced Western Storm in a rematch of the previous year, but this time the result was reversed, as Storm were victorious by 7 wickets. The Vipers were unable to replicate their form in 2018, finishing bottom of the group, with just two wins from ten games.

In 2019, however, Southern Vipers competed in their third Finals Day after qualifying third in the group, with four wins and a tie. After beating Loughborough Lightning in the semi-final, the Vipers again faced Western Storm in the final. Danni Wyatt's 73 helped Southern Vipers to 172/7 batting first, but Storm chased down the target with one over to spare. Wyatt ended the tournament as the leading run-scorer and Player of the Tournament.

=== 2020–2024: Domestic Regional Hub ===
In 2020, women's cricket in England was restructured, creating eight new 'regional hub' teams, with the intention of playing both 50-over and 20-over cricket. The Southern Vipers brand was retained after this restructuring, with some differences to the squad and coaching staff. Due to the COVID-19 pandemic, the 2020 season was truncated, and only 50-over cricket was played, in the Rachael Heyhoe Flint Trophy. Southern Vipers won all 6 of their group stage games, finishing top of the South Group and progressing to the Final, where they faced the Northern Diamonds. The Vipers, batting first, reached 150–1 before collapsing to 231 all out, with captain Georgia Adams top scoring with 80. Vipers spinner Charlotte Taylor then took 6/34 as Northern Diamonds were bowled out for 193, meaning that the Vipers won the inaugural Rachael Heyhoe Flint Trophy. Adams and Taylor were the leading run-scorer and wicket-taker in the tournament, respectively. At the end of the season, five Vipers players were given full-time domestic contracts, the first of their kind in England: Georgia Adams, Tara Norris, Paige Scholfield, Lauren Bell and Maia Bouchier.

The following season, 2021, Southern Vipers competed in both the Rachael Heyhoe Flint Trophy and the newly-formed Twenty20 competition, the Charlotte Edwards Cup. In the Charlotte Edwards Cup the side progressed to Finals Day as the best second-placed team, winning four of their six matches in Group A. However, they lost to Northern Diamonds in the semi-final, being bowled out for 117 in response to the Diamonds' 135/6. In the Rachael Heyhoe Flint Trophy, Southern Vipers progressed directly to the final after topping the group, winning six of their seven matches. In the final they again faced Northern Diamonds, in a repeat of the previous year's match. Bowling first, the Vipers restricted their opponents to 183, but were in turn reduced to 109/7 in reply. However, an unbeaten stand of 78 for the 8th wicket between Emily Windsor (47*) and Tara Norris (40*) saw Southern Vipers home with 2 balls to spare.

Ahead of the 2022 season, Southern Vipers launched the South Central Counties Cup, a 50-over tournament for the counties that make up the Vipers region. That season, they won their first Charlotte Edwards Cup, going unbeaten in the group stage before beating Central Sparks in the final. They again qualified for the final of the Rachael Heyhoe Flint Trophy, this time via the play-off, beating South East Stars by 6 wickets after qualifying third in the initial group stage. They again played Northern Diamonds in the final, the third consecutive encounter between the two sides, but this time Vipers lost by two runs.

In 2023, Southern Vipers won the domestic double. In the Charlotte Edwards Cup, they finished second in the group stage before defeating North West Thunder in the semi-final and The Blaze in the final. In the Rachael Heyhoe Flint Trophy, they topped the group stage with seven victories in fourteen matches, before defeating The Blaze in the final.

In 2024, the side reached the semi-finals of both competitions, finishing third in both group stages and losing to South East Stars in both semi-finals. 2024 was the side's final season, with reforms to the structure of domestic cricket in England meaning that the side was effectively replaced by a professionalised Hampshire team.

== Home grounds ==
Venue	Games hosted by season									
Venue	16	17	18	19	20	21	22	23	24	Total
Rose Bowl	3	2	3	3	2	3	4	4	5	29
Arundel Castle Cricket Ground	–	1	1	1	–	1	–	2	2	8
County Ground, Hove	–	–	1	1	1	2	3	3	2	13
Newclose County Cricket Ground	–	–	–	–	–	–	–	1	–	1
Falkland Cricket Club	–	–	–	–	–	–	–	1	1	2
Sir Paul Getty's Ground	–	–	–	–	–	–	–	–	2	2

== Players ==
=== Overseas players ===
- Suzie Bates – New Zealand (2016–2019)
- Sara McGlashan – New Zealand (2016)
- Morna Nielsen – New Zealand (2016)
- (Cricket West Indies) Hayley Matthews – West Indies (2017)
- Mignon du Preez – South Africa (2017–2018)
- Amelia Kerr – New Zealand (2018)
- (Cricket West Indies) Stafanie Taylor – West Indies (2019)
- Amanda-Jade Wellington – Australia (2019)
- Gaby Lewis – Ireland (2021)
- Nicole Faltum – Australia (2023)
- Maitlan Brown – Australia (2023)
- Charli Knott – Australia (2024)

== Seasons ==
=== Women's Cricket Super League ===
Season	Final standing	League standings									Notes
Season	Final standing	P	W	L	T	NR	BP	Pts	NRR	Pos	Notes
2016	Champions	5	4	1	0	0	3	11	+1.437	1st	Won against Western Storm in the final
2017	Runners-up	5	4	1	0	0	4	20	+2.001	1st	Lost to Western Storm in the final
2018	Group stage	10	2	7	0	1	0	10	–0.490	6th	DNQ
2019	Runners-up	10	4	4	1	1	2	20	+0.425	3rd	Lost to Western Storm in the final

=== Rachael Heyhoe Flint Trophy ===
Season	Final standing	League standings									Notes
Season	Final standing	P	W	L	T	NR	BP	Pts	NRR	Pos	Notes
2020	Champions	6	6	0	0	0	3	27	+1.017	1st	Won against Northern Diamonds in the final
2021	Champions	7	6	1	0	0	3	27	+0.417	1st	Won against Northern Diamonds in the final
2022	Runners-up	7	5	1	0	1	2	24	+0.762	3rd	Lost to Northern Diamonds in the final
2023	Champions	14	7	4	1	2	4	38	+0.457	1st	Won against The Blaze in the final
2024	Semi-finals	14	7	6	0	1	4	34	+0.534	3rd	Lost to South East Stars in the semi-finals

=== Charlotte Edwards Cup ===
Season	Final standing	League standings									Notes
Season	Final standing	P	W	L	T	NR	BP	Pts	NRR	Pos	Notes
2021	Losing semi-finalists: 3rd	6	4	2	0	0	3	19	+0.875	2nd	Lost to Northern Diamonds in the semi-final
2022	Champions	6	6	0	0	0	3	27	+1.400	1st	Won against Central Sparks in the final
2023	Champions	7	5	2	0	0	2	22	+0.940	2nd	Won against The Blaze in the final
2024	Semi-finals	10	6	4	0	0	2	26	+1.001	3rd	Lost to South East Stars in the semi-finals

== Statistics ==
=== Women's Cricket Super League ===
Women's Cricket Super League - summary of results
Year	Played	Wins	Losses	Tied	NR	Win %
2016	6	5	1	0	0	83.33
2017	6	4	2	0	0	66.66
2018	10	2	7	1	0	20.00
2019	12	5	5	1	1	41.66
Total	34	16	15	1	2	47.05

- Abandoned matches are counted as NR (no result)
- Win or loss by super over or boundary count are counted as tied.

Women's Cricket Super League - teamwise result summary
Opposition	Mat	Won	Lost	Tied	NR	Win %
Lancashire Thunder	6	3	2	1	0	50.00
Loughborough Lightning	7	4	3	0	0	57.14
Surrey Stars	6	3	2	0	1	50.00
Western Storm	9	2	6	0	1	22.22
Yorkshire Diamonds	6	4	2	0	0	66.66

=== Rachael Heyhoe Flint Trophy ===
Rachael Heyhoe Flint Trophy - summary of results
Year	Played	Wins	Losses	Tied	NR	Win %
2020	7	7	0	0	0	100.00
2021	8	7	1	0	0	87.50
2022	9	6	2	0	1	66.67
2023	15	8	4	1	2	53.33
2024	15	7	7	0	1	46.67
Total	54	35	14	1	4	64.81

- Abandoned matches are counted as NR (no result)
- Win or loss by super over or boundary count are counted as tied.

Rachael Heyhoe Flint Trophy - teamwise result summary
Opposition	Mat	Won	Lost	Tied	NR	Win %
Central Sparks	6	3	3	0	0	50.00
Northern Diamonds	9	5	3	0	1	55.55
North West Thunder	6	4	0	1	1	66.67
South East Stars	10	8	2	0	0	80.00
Sunrisers	8	4	4	0	0	50.00
The Blaze	7	5	2	0	0	71.43
Western Storm	8	6	0	0	2	75.00

=== Charlotte Edwards Cup ===
Charlotte Edwards Cup - summary of results
Year	Played	Wins	Losses	Tied	NR	Win %
2021	7	4	3	0	0	57.14
2022	7	7	0	0	0	100.00
2023	9	7	2	0	0	77.78
2024	11	6	5	0	0	54.54
Total	34	24	10	0	0	70.59

- Abandoned matches are counted as NR (no result)
- Win or loss by super over or boundary count are counted as tied.

Charlotte Edwards Cup - teamwise result summary
Opposition	Mat	Won	Lost	Tied	NR	Win %
Central Sparks	5	2	3	0	0	40.00
Northern Diamonds	5	4	1	0	0	80.00
North West Thunder	5	5	0	0	0	100.00
South East Stars	6	3	3	0	0	50.00
Sunrisers	3	2	1	0	0	66.67
The Blaze	7	5	2	0	0	71.43
Western Storm	3	3	0	0	0	100.00

== Records ==
=== Women's Cricket Super League ===
- Highest team total: 184/4, v Yorkshire Diamonds on 25 August 2019.
- Lowest team total: 91, v Western Storm on 31 July 2018.
- Highest individual score: 119*, Suzie Bates v Loughborough Lightning on 15 August 2017.
- Best individual bowling analysis: 4/10, Linsey Smith v Yorkshire Diamonds on 8 August 2016.
- Most runs: 983 in 33 matches, Suzie Bates.
- Most wickets: 35 wickets in 28 matches, Tash Farrant.

=== Rachael Heyhoe Flint Trophy ===
- Highest team total: 309/9, v Sunrisers on 12 September 2021.
- Lowest (completed) team total: 104 v Central Sparks on 5 June 2021.
- Highest individual score: 154*, Georgia Adams v Western Storm on 13 September 2020.
- Best individual bowling analysis: 6/34, Charlotte Taylor v Northern Diamonds on 27 September 2020.
- Most runs: 1,859 runs in 49 matches, Georgia Adams.
- Most wickets: 71 wickets in 49 matches, Georgia Adams.

=== Charlotte Edwards Cup ===
- Highest team total: 191/6, v North West Thunder on 10 June 2023.
- Lowest (completed) team total: 98 v Central Sparks on 16 June 2024.
- Highest individual score: 93, Maia Bouchier v South East Stars on 19 June 2024.
- Best individual bowling analysis: 5/19, Charlie Dean v Central Sparks on 26 June 2021.
- Most runs: 822 runs in 33 matches, Georgia Adams.
- Most wickets: 36 wickets in 20 matches, Charlie Dean.

== Honours ==
- Women's Cricket Super League:
  - Champions (1) – 2016
- Rachael Heyhoe Flint Trophy:
  - Champions (3) – 2020, 2021 & 2023
- Charlotte Edwards Cup:
  - Champions (2) – 2022 & 2023

== See also ==
- Berkshire Women cricket team
- Buckinghamshire Women cricket team
- Dorset Women cricket team
- Hampshire Women cricket team
- Oxfordshire Women cricket team
- Sussex Women cricket team
- Southampton Solent University
