= Central Sparks =

English women's cricket team

Team information
- Colours: Black and purple
- Established: 2020
- Home ground: Edgbaston Cricket Ground; New Road, Worcester; Chester Road North Ground; Scorers, Shirley

History
- RHFT wins: 0
- CEC wins: 0
- Official website: Central Sparks
Playing kit

Central Sparks was a women's cricket team that represented the West Midlands region, one of eight regional hubs in English domestic women's cricket. They primarily played their home matches at Edgbaston and New Road. They were captained by Evelyn Jones and coached by Darren Franklin and Justine Dunce. The team was partnered with Warwickshire, Worcestershire, Herefordshire, Staffordshire and Shropshire.

At the end of the 2024 season, following reforms to the structure of women's domestic cricket, the team was effectively replaced by a professionalised Warwickshire team.

== History ==
In 2020, women's cricket in England was restructured, creating eight new 'regional hub' teams, with the intention of playing both 50-over and 20-over cricket. Central Sparks were one of the sides created under this structure, representing the West Midlands and partnered with Warwickshire, Worcestershire, Herefordshire, Staffordshire and Shropshire. The side was to be captained by Evelyn Jones and coached by Lloyd Tennant. Due to the COVID-19 pandemic, the 2020 season was truncated, and only 50-over cricket was played, in the Rachael Heyhoe Flint Trophy. Central Sparks finished second in the North Group of the competition, winning three of their six games but failing to progress to the final. At the end of the season, five Sparks players were given full-time domestic contracts, the first of their kind in England: Evelyn Jones, Marie Kelly, Issy Wong, Emily Arlott and Gwenan Davies.

The following season, 2021, Sparks competed in both the Rachael Heyhoe Flint Trophy and the newly-formed Twenty20 competition, the Charlotte Edwards Cup. In the Charlotte Edwards Cup the side finished third in their group, winning three of their six matches. In the Rachael Heyhoe Flint Trophy, Central Sparks qualified for the knockout stages of the tournament, finishing third in the group of eight with five wins from their seven matches. During the group stages, Amy Jones hit the highest score of the tournament, scoring 163* against Western Storm, whilst Emily Arlott recorded the best individual bowling figures of the tournament against Southern Vipers, taking 5/29 including a hat-trick. In the play-off, however, the side lost to Northern Diamonds by 6 wickets to be eliminated from the competition. In 2022, they reached the final of the Charlotte Edwards Cup after finishing second in Group A and beating South East Stars in the semi-final. However, they lost to Southern Vipers in the final. Sparks batter Amy Jones was the leading run-scorer in the tournament, with 289 runs, and was named the PCA Player of the Tournament. In July 2022, the side launched the West Midlands Regional Cup, to aid the development of players playing for county sides in the region. The side finished fifth in the group of eight in the 2022 Rachael Heyhoe Flint Trophy.

In 2023, Central Sparks finished seventh out of eight in the Charlotte Edwards Cup and fifth out of eight in the Rachael Heyhoe Flint Trophy. Sparks bowler Georgia Davis was the leading wicket-taker in the Rachael Heyhoe Flint Trophy, with 27 wickets. In 2024, the side reached the semi-finals of the Charlotte Edwards Cup and finished seventh in the Rachael Heyhoe Flint Trophy.

2024 was the side's final season, with reforms to the structure of domestic cricket in England meaning that the side was effectively replaced by a professionalised Warwickshire team.

== Home grounds ==
| Venue | Games hosted by season | | | | | |
|---|---|---|---|---|---|---|
| Venue | 20 | 21 | 22 | 23 | 24 | Total |
| Edgbaston Cricket Ground | 2 | 2 | 2 | 4 | 5 | 15 |
| New Road, Worcester | 2 | 3 | 4 | 4 | 5 | 18 |
| Edgbaston Foundation Ground | – | 1 | 1 | – | – | 2 |
| Sir Paul Getty's Ground | – | – | – | 1 | – | 1 |
| Scorers, Shirley | – | – | – | 1 | 1 | 2 |
| Chester Road North Ground | – | – | – | – | 1 | 1 |

== Players ==
=== Overseas players ===
- Erin Burns – Australia (2023)
- Maddy Green – New Zealand (2023)
- Courtney Webb – Australia (2024)

== Seasons ==
=== Rachael Heyhoe Flint Trophy ===
| Season | Final standing | League standings | | | | | | | | | Notes |
| Season | Final standing | P | W | L | T | NR | BP | Pts | NRR | Pos | Notes |
|---|---|---|---|---|---|---|---|---|---|---|---|
| 2020 | Group stage | 6 | 3 | 3 | 0 | 0 | 1 | 13 | −0.285 | 2nd | DNQ |
| 2021 | Losing semi-finalists: 3rd | 7 | 5 | 2 | 0 | 0 | 2 | 22 | +0.822 | 3rd | Lost to Northern Diamonds in the semi-final |
| 2022 | Group stage | 7 | 2 | 4 | 0 | 1 | 1 | 11 | +0.073 | 5th | DNQ |
| 2023 | Group stage | 14 | 6 | 5 | 1 | 2 | 1 | 31 | –0.233 | 5th | DNQ |
| 2024 | Group stage | 14 | 5 | 8 | 0 | 1 | 3 | 25 | –0.299 | 7th | DNQ |

=== Charlotte Edwards Cup ===
| Season | Final standing | League standings | | | | | | | | | Notes |
| Season | Final standing | P | W | L | T | NR | BP | Pts | NRR | Pos | Notes |
|---|---|---|---|---|---|---|---|---|---|---|---|
| 2021 | Group stages | 6 | 3 | 3 | 0 | 0 | 0 | 12 | –0.669 | 3rd | DNQ |
| 2022 | Runners-up | 6 | 4 | 2 | 0 | 0 | 1 | 17 | +0.552 | 2nd | Lost to Southern Vipers in the final |
| 2023 | Group stages | 7 | 2 | 5 | 0 | 0 | 0 | 8 | –0.558 | 7th | DNQ |
| 2024 | Semi-finals | 10 | 6 | 4 | 0 | 0 | 2 | 26 | +0.402 | 4th | Lost to The Blaze in the semi-finals |

== Statistics ==
=== Rachael Heyhoe Flint Trophy ===
Rachael Heyhoe Flint Trophy – summary of results
| Year | Played | Wins | Losses | Tied | NR | Win % |
|---|---|---|---|---|---|---|
| 2020 | 6 | 3 | 3 | 0 | 0 | 50.00 |
| 2021 | 8 | 5 | 3 | 0 | 0 | 62.50 |
| 2022 | 7 | 2 | 4 | 0 | 1 | 28.57 |
| 2023 | 14 | 6 | 5 | 1 | 2 | 42.86 |
| 2024 | 14 | 5 | 8 | 0 | 1 | 35.71 |
| Total | 49 | 21 | 23 | 1 | 4 | 42.86 |

- Abandoned matches are counted as NR (no result)
- Win or loss by super over or boundary count are counted as tied.

Rachael Heyhoe Flint Trophy – teamwise result summary
| Opposition | Mat | Won | Lost | Tied | NR | Win % |
|---|---|---|---|---|---|---|
| Northern Diamonds | 9 | 4 | 5 | 0 | 0 | 44.44 |
| North West Thunder | 8 | 4 | 3 | 1 | 0 | 50.00 |
| South East Stars | 6 | 2 | 4 | 0 | 0 | 33.33 |
| Southern Vipers | 6 | 3 | 3 | 0 | 0 | 50.00 |
| Sunrisers | 6 | 2 | 2 | 0 | 2 | 33.33 |
| The Blaze | 8 | 2 | 5 | 0 | 1 | 25.00 |
| Western Storm | 6 | 4 | 1 | 0 | 1 | 66.67 |

=== Charlotte Edwards Cup ===
Charlotte Edwards Cup - summary of results
| Year | Played | Wins | Losses | Tied | NR | Win % |
|---|---|---|---|---|---|---|
| 2021 | 6 | 3 | 3 | 0 | 0 | 50.00 |
| 2022 | 8 | 5 | 3 | 0 | 0 | 62.50 |
| 2023 | 7 | 2 | 5 | 0 | 0 | 28.57 |
| 2024 | 11 | 6 | 5 | 0 | 0 | 54.55 |
| Total | 32 | 16 | 16 | 0 | 0 | 50.00 |

- Abandoned matches are counted as NR (no result)
- Win or loss by super over or boundary count are counted as tied.

Charlotte Edwards Cup - teamwise result summary
| Opposition | Mat | Won | Lost | Tied | NR | Win % |
|---|---|---|---|---|---|---|
| Northern Diamonds | 3 | 1 | 2 | 0 | 0 | 33.33 |
| North West Thunder | 3 | 1 | 2 | 0 | 0 | 33.33 |
| South East Stars | 7 | 3 | 4 | 0 | 0 | 42.86 |
| Southern Vipers | 5 | 3 | 2 | 0 | 0 | 60.00 |
| Sunrisers | 4 | 4 | 0 | 0 | 0 | 100.00 |
| The Blaze | 6 | 2 | 4 | 0 | 0 | 33.33 |
| Western Storm | 4 | 2 | 2 | 0 | 0 | 50.00 |

== Records ==
=== Rachael Heyhoe Flint Trophy ===
- Highest team total: 297/3, v Western Storm on 26 August 2024.
- Lowest (completed) team total: 102 v Western Storm on 12 July 2024.
- Highest individual score: 163*, Amy Jones v Western Storm on 31 May 2021.
- Best individual bowling analysis: 6/23, Georgia Davis v Western Storm on 26 August 2024.
- Most runs: 1,780 runs in 45 matches, Evelyn Jones.
- Most wickets: 52 wickets in 31 matches, Georgia Davis.

=== Charlotte Edwards Cup ===
- Highest team total: 170/6, v South East Stars on 18 May 2022.
- Lowest (completed) team total: 109/8 v Southern Vipers on 11 June 2022.
- Highest individual score: 100*, Marie Kelly v Southern Vipers on 25 August 2021.
- Best individual bowling analysis: 4/12, Georgia Davis v Lightning on 10 July 2021.
- Most runs: 759 runs in 29 matches, Evelyn Jones.
- Most wickets: 32 wickets in 26 matches, Emily Arlott.

== See also ==
- Shropshire Women cricket team
- Staffordshire Women cricket team
- Warwickshire Women cricket team
- Worcestershire Women cricket team
