= 2022 Central Sparks season =

English cricket season

Central Sparks
2022 season
- Coach: Lloyd Tennant
- Captain: Evelyn Jones
- RHFT: 5th
- CEC: Runners-up
- Most runs: RHFT: Abigail Freeborn (227); CEC: Amy Jones (289)
- Most wickets: RHFT: Grace Potts (10); CEC: Grace Potts (12)
- Most catches: RHFT: Evelyn Jones (3) & Ami Campbell (3); CEC: Gwenan Davies (5)
- Most wicket-keeping dismissals: RHFT: Abigail Freeborn (9); CEC: Amy Jones (12)

The 2022 season was Central Sparks' third season, in which they competed in the 50 over Rachael Heyhoe Flint Trophy and the Twenty20 Charlotte Edwards Cup. In the Charlotte Edwards Cup, the side finished second in Group A, winning four of their six matches and progressing to the semi-final as the best second-placed team. They beat South East Stars by 2 wickets in the semi-final, but lost to Southern Vipers by 6 wickets in the final. Central Sparks wicket-keeper batter Amy Jones was named as Player of the Year in the Charlotte Edwards Cup, and was the tournament's leading run-scorer with 289 runs in 8 matches. The side finished fifth in the Rachael Heyhoe Flint Trophy, winning two of their six matches.

The side was captained by Evelyn Jones and coached by Lloyd Tennant. They played four home matches at New Road, two at Edgbaston Cricket Ground and one at Edgbaston Foundation Ground.

== Squad ==
=== Changes ===
On 29 October 2021, it was announced that Central Sparks had signed Ami Campbell from Northern Diamonds and Abigail Freeborn from Lightning, and that both players had signed a professional contract. On the same day, it was announced that Marie Kelly had left the side, joining Lightning. The side confirmed their 21-player squad for the season on 9 May 2022, with no further changes. The following day, it was confirmed that Chloe Hill had joined Southern Vipers on loan for the Charlotte Edwards Cup. Hill's loan was later extended for the Rachael Heyhoe Flint Trophy. Gwenan Davies joined Lightning on loan for two matches during the Rachael Heyhoe Flint Trophy. Gabrielle Basketter was added to the squad in September 2022, making her debut for the side on 11 September.

=== Squad list ===
- Age given is at the start of Central Sparks' first match of the season (14 May 2022).

Name	Nationality	Birth date	Batting style	Bowling style	Notes
Batters
Ami Campbell	England	6 June 1991 (aged 30)	Left-handed	Right-arm medium	
Milly Home	England	27 February 2001 (aged 21)	Right-handed	Right-arm medium	
Evelyn Jones	England	8 August 1992 (aged 29)	Left-handed	Left-arm medium	Captain
Davina Perrin	England	8 September 2006 (aged 15)	Right-handed	Right-arm leg break	
All-rounders
Gabrielle Basketter	England	12 May 1993 (aged 29)	Right-handed	Right-arm off break	Joined September 2022
Clare Boycott	England	31 December 1993 (aged 28)	Right-handed	Right-arm medium	
Thea Brookes	England	15 February 1993 (aged 29)	Right-handed	Right-arm off break	
Stephanie Butler	England	23 April 1994 (aged 28)	Left-handed	Right-arm off break	
Ria Fackrell	England	16 September 1999 (aged 22)	Right-handed	Right-arm off break	
Wicket-keepers
Gwenan Davies	Wales	12 May 1994 (aged 28)	Left-handed	Right-arm medium	Two match loan to Lightning in July 2022
Poppy Davies	England	23 June 2000 (aged 21)	Right-handed	—	
Abigail Freeborn	England	12 November 1996 (aged 25)	Right-handed	—	
Chloe Hill	England	3 January 1997 (aged 25)	Right-handed	—	Full season loan to Southern Vipers
Amy Jones	England	13 June 1993 (aged 28)	Right-handed	—	
Bowlers
Emily Arlott	England	23 February 1998 (aged 24)	Right-handed	Right-arm medium	
Hannah Baker	England	3 February 2004 (aged 18)	Right-handed	Right-arm leg break	
Georgia Davis	England	3 June 1999 (aged 22)	Right-handed	Right-arm off break	
Sarah Glenn	England	27 August 1999 (aged 22)	Right-handed	Right-arm leg break	
Anisha Patel	England	17 August 1995 (aged 26)	Right-handed	Right-arm leg break	
Grace Potts	England	12 July 2002 (aged 19)	Right-handed	Right-arm medium	
Elizabeth Russell	England	22 May 1994 (aged 27)	Left-handed	Right-arm medium	
Issy Wong	England	15 May 2002 (aged 19)	Right-handed	Right-arm medium	

== Charlotte Edwards Cup ==
=== Group A ===
Pos	Team	Pld	W	L	T	NR	BP	Pts	NRR
1	South East Stars (Q)	6	5	1	0	0	1	21	0.660
2	Central Sparks (Q)	6	4	2	0	0	1	17	0.552
3	Western Storm	6	3	3	0	0	1	13	0.148
4	Sunrisers	6	0	6	0	0	0	0	−1.287

Source: England and Wales Cricket Board
- advanced to the semi-final

=== Fixtures ===
14 May 2022
14:30 BST
Scorecard

Central Sparks; 156/4 (20 overs)	v	Western Storm; 136/6 (20 overs)
Amy Jones 52 (44); Danielle Gibson 2/37 (4 overs)		Sophie Luff 43 (29); Issy Wong 2/28 (4 overs)

Central Sparks won by 20 runs
Sophia Gardens, Cardiff
Umpires: Anna Harris and Hassan Adnan

- Western Storm won the toss and elected to field.
- Points: Central Sparks 4, Western Storm 0

18 May 2022
16:00 BST
Scorecard

Central Sparks; 170/6 (20 overs)	v	South East Stars; 136 (20 overs)
Issy Wong 45 (28); Alice Davidson-Richards 2/27 (4 overs)		Bryony Smith 41 (31); Grace Potts 4/36 (4 overs)

Central Sparks won by 34 runs
Woodbridge Road, Guildford
Umpires: Paul Baldwin and Sophie McLelland

- South East Stars won the toss and elected to field.
- Points: Central Sparks 5, South East Stars 0

21 May 2022
14:30 BST
Scorecard

Central Sparks; 153/5 (20 overs)	v	Sunrisers; 129/8 (20 overs)
Amy Jones 80 (49); Kelly Castle 2/19 (4 overs)		Naomi Dattani 51 (32); Sarah Glenn 2/14 (4 overs)

Central Sparks won by 24 runs
Edgbaston Cricket Ground, Birmingham
Umpires: Grace Bambury and Sue Redfern

- Sunrisers won the toss and elected to field.
- Points: Central Sparks 4, Sunrisers 0

29 May 2022
18:15 BST (D/N)
Scorecard

South East Stars; 148/6 (20 overs)	v	Central Sparks; 91/7 (12 overs)
Aylish Cranstone 59* (53); Sarah Glenn 3/17 (4 overs)		Evelyn Jones 25 (23); Danielle Gregory 2/6 (2 overs)

South East Stars won by 10 runs (DLS)
Edgbaston Cricket Ground, Birmingham
Umpires: Ian Blackwell and Jane Pratt

- South East Stars won the toss and elected to bat.
- Central Sparks' target revised to 102 from 12 overs due to rain.
- Points: South East Stars 4, Central Sparks 0

1 June 2022
14:30 BST
Scorecard

Central Sparks; 146/5 (20 overs)	v	Sunrisers; 143/6 (20 overs)
Evelyn Jones 69 (62); Naomi Dattani 2/39 (4 overs)		Jo Gardner 41 (30); Elizabeth Russell 2/24 (4 overs)

Central Sparks won by 3 runs
County Ground, Northampton
Umpires: Billy Taylor and Jasmine Naeem

- Central Sparks won the toss and elected to bat.
- Points: Central Sparks 4, Sunrisers 0

4 June 2022
14:30 BST
Scorecard

Central Sparks; 134/4 (20 overs)	v	Western Storm; 135/3 (18.5 overs)
Amy Jones 63 (46); Sophia Smale 2/17 (4 overs)		Georgia Hennessy 47* (45); Emily Arlott 2/29 (4 overs)

Western Storm won by 7 wickets
New Road, Worcester
Umpires: Jane Pratt and Naeem Ashraf

- Central Sparks won the toss and elected to bat.
- Points: Western Storm 4, Central Sparks 0

==== Semi-final ====
11 June 2022
12:00 BST
Scorecard

South East Stars; 104/8 (20 overs)	v	Central Sparks; 105/8 (19.1 overs)
Kalea Moore 34 (42); Grace Potts 3/20 (4 overs)		Evelyn Jones 29 (24); Bryony Smith 4/14 (4 overs)

Central Sparks won by 2 wickets
County Ground, Northampton
Umpires: Sarah Bartlett and Sophie McLelland
Player of the match: Issy Wong (Central Sparks)

- South East Stars won the toss and elected to bat.

==== Final ====
11 June 2022
16:00 BST
Scorecard

Central Sparks; 109/8 (20 overs)	v	Southern Vipers; 110/4 (15.5 overs)
Amy Jones 27 (23); Charlie Dean 2/19 (4 overs)		Maia Bouchier 32 (25); Emily Arlott 2/28 (4 overs)

Southern Vipers won by 6 wickets
County Ground, Northampton
Umpires: Anna Harris and Sue Redfern
Player of the match: Charlie Dean (Southern Vipers)

- Central Sparks won the toss and elected to bat.

=== Tournament statistics ===
==== Batting ====
Player	Matches	Innings	Runs	Average	High score	100s	50s
Amy Jones	8	8	289	36.12	80	0	3
Evelyn Jones	8	8	213	26.62	69	0	1
Abigail Freeborn	8	8	163	20.37	52	0	1
Issy Wong	8	8	74	13.25	45	0	0
Ami Campbell	8	8	74	14.80	30*	0	0
Emily Arlott	8	4	56	56.00	19*	0	0

Source: ESPN Cricinfo Qualification: 50 runs.

==== Bowling ====
Player	Matches	Overs	Wickets	Average	Economy	BBI	5wi
Grace Potts	7	26.0	12	16.83	7.76	4/36	0
Sarah Glenn	8	32.0	10	16.60	5.18	3/17	0
Emily Arlott	8	32.0	9	23.44	6.59	2/27	0
Issy Wong	8	30.5	8	24.87	6.45	2/8	0
Hannah Baker	8	26.0	7	23.14	6.23	2/19	0

Source: ESPN Cricinfo Qualification: 5 wickets.

== Rachael Heyhoe Flint Trophy ==
=== Season standings ===
Pos	Team	Pld	W	L	T	NR	BP	Pts	NRR
1	Northern Diamonds (Q)	7	6	0	0	1	2	28	0.851
2	South East Stars (Q)	7	5	1	0	1	4	26	0.687
3	Southern Vipers (Q)	7	5	1	0	1	2	24	0.762
4	Western Storm	7	3	3	0	1	1	15	−0.214
5	Central Sparks	7	2	4	0	1	1	11	0.073
6	Lightning	7	2	4	0	1	1	11	−0.630
7	North West Thunder	7	1	5	0	1	0	6	−0.366
8	Sunrisers	7	0	6	0	1	0	2	−1.046

Source: England and Wales Cricket Board

advanced to final advanced to the play-off

=== Fixtures ===
2 July 2022
10:30 BST
Scorecard

Central Sparks; 163/7 (36 overs)	v	Southern Vipers; 75/3 (9.4 overs)
Evelyn Jones 39 (70); Paige Scholfield 2/20 (4 overs)		Danni Wyatt 36* (24); Grace Potts 1/10 (2 overs); Sarah Glenn 1/10 (2 overs)

Southern Vipers won by 7 wickets (DLS)
Edgbaston Foundation Ground, Birmingham
Umpires: Joanne Ibbotson and Tom Lungley

- Southern Vipers won the toss and elected to field.
- Central Sparks innings reduced to 36 overs due to rain.
- Southern Vipers innings reduced to 10 overs due to rain; target was 70.
- Points: Southern Vipers 4, Central Sparks 0

9 July 2022
10:30 BST
Scorecard

Central Sparks; 206 (50 overs)	v	Western Storm; 184/9 (50 overs)
Ami Campbell 50 (75); Lauren Filer 3/36 (10 overs)		Lauren Filer 58* (69); Sarah Glenn 4/23 (10 overs)

Central Sparks won by 22 runs
County Ground, Bristol
Umpires: Jack Shantry and Sophie McLelland

- Central Sparks won the toss and elected to bat.
- Points: Central Sparks 4, Western Storm 0

16 July 2022
10:30 BST
Scorecard

Central Sparks; 214/6 (50 overs)	v	Northern Diamonds; 215/5 (39.2 overs)
Evelyn Jones 91 (128); Emma Marlow 2/37 (10 overs)		Hollie Armitage 60* (63); Grace Potts 2/43 (7.2 overs)

Northern Diamonds won by 5 wickets
New Road, Worcester
Umpires: Anthony Harris and Sarah Bartlett

- Central Sparks won the toss and elected to bat.
- Points: Northern Diamonds 5, Central Sparks 0

23 July 2022
14:00 BST (D/N)
Scorecard

North West Thunder; 236/9 (48 overs)	v	Central Sparks; 191 (41.4 overs)
Emma Lamb 68 (69); Emily Arlott 4/36 (10 overs)		Abigail Freeborn 72 (72); Emma Lamb 3/26 (7 overs)

North West Thunder won by 28 runs (DLS)
Old Trafford Cricket Ground, Manchester
Umpires: Jack Shantry and Sophie McLelland

- Central Sparks won the toss and elected to field.
- Match reduced to 48 overs per side due to rain.
- Central Sparks innings reduced to 43 overs due to rain; target was 220.
- Points: North West Thunder 4, Central Sparks 0

9 September 2022
10:30 BST

Central Sparks	v	Lightning

No Result
New Road, Worcester

- The match was postponed due to the death of Queen Elizabeth II, and later deemed a no result with points shared.
- Points: Central Sparks 2, Lightning 2

11 September 2022
10:30 BST
Scorecard

South East Stars; 254/9 (50 overs)	v	Central Sparks; 195/9 (50 overs)
Chloe Brewer 57 (76); Elizabeth Russell 3/44 (10 overs)		Georgia Davis 52* (103); Eva Gray 3/28 (8 overs)

South East Stars won by 59 runs
County Ground, Beckenham
Umpires: Joanne Ibbotson and Russell Warren

- Central Sparks won the toss and elected to field.
- Points: South East Stars 5, Central Sparks 0

17 September 2022
10:30 BST
Scorecard

Central Sparks; 260/9 (50 overs)	v	Sunrisers; 121 (28.5 overs)
Emily Arlott 63 (73); Mady Villiers 3/44 (10 overs)		Grace Scrivens 61 (75); Davina Perrin 3/26 (5 overs)

Central Sparks won by 139 runs
New Road, Worcester
Umpires: Jack Shantry and Joanne Ibbotson

- Sunrisers won the toss and elected to field.
- Points: Central Sparks 5, Sunrisers 0

=== Tournament statistics ===
==== Batting ====
Player	Matches	Innings	Runs	Average	High score	100s	50s
Abigail Freeborn	6	6	227	45.40	72	0	1
Evelyn Jones	6	6	224	37.33	91	0	1
Davina Perrin	5	5	137	27.40	46	0	0

Source: ESPN Cricinfo Qualification: 100 runs.

==== Bowling ====
Player	Matches	Overs	Wickets	Average	Economy	BBI	5wi
Grace Potts	6	47.2	10	20.60	4.35	2/33	0
Sarah Glenn	3	18.0	7	8.28	4.35	4/23	0
Emily Arlott	4	30.2	6	21.16	4.18	4/36	0
Elizabeth Russell	5	29.0	6	27.83	5.75	3/44	0
Hannah Baker	5	35.4	5	39.00	5.46	2/59	0

Source: ESPN Cricinfo Qualification: 5 wickets.

== Season statistics ==
=== Batting ===
Player	Rachael Heyhoe Flint Trophy								Charlotte Edwards Cup							
Player	Matches	Innings	Runs	High score	Average	Strike rate	100s	50s	Matches	Innings	Runs	High score	Average	Strike rate	100s	50s
Emily Arlott	4	4	81	63	25.33	54.28	0	1	8	4	56	19*	56.00	121.73	0	0
Hannah Baker	5	3	2	1*	1.00	28.57	0	0	8	–	–	–	–	–	–	–
Gabrielle Basketter	1	1	14	14	14.00	87.50	0	0	–	–	–	–	–	–	–	–
Thea Brookes	4	4	32	14	8.00	51.61	0	0	1	1	0	0	0.00	–	0	0
Clare Boycott	1	1	10	10*	–	58.82	0	0	–	–	–	–	–	–	–	–
Stephanie Butler	1	1	12	12	12.00	38.70	0	0	–	–	–	–	–	–	–	–
Ami Campbell	6	6	89	50	14.83	58.94	0	1	8	8	163	52	20.37	98.78	0	1
Georgia Davis	6	6	76	52*	25.33	54.28	0	1	–	–	–	–	–	–	–	–
Gwenan Davies	–	–	–	–	–	–	–	–	8	7	42	17	10.50	85.71	0	0
Ria Fackrell	4	4	36	16	9.00	72.00	0	0	–	–	–	–	–	–	–	–
Abigail Freeborn	6	6	227	72	45.40	81.94	0	1	8	8	163	52	20.37	98.78	0	1
Sarah Glenn	3	3	50	33	16.66	79.36	0	0	8	4	40	16	20.00	97.56	0	0
Milly Home	2	2	25	24	12.50	51.02	0	0	–	–	–	–	–	–	–	–
Amy Jones	–	–	–	–	–	–	–	–	8	8	289	80	36.12	136.96	0	3
Evelyn Jones	6	6	224	91	37.33	60.86	0	1	8	8	289	80	36.12	136.96	0	3
Anisha Patel	1	–	–	–	–	–	–	–	–	–	–	–	–	–	–	–
Davina Perrin	5	5	137	46	27.40	61.43	0	0	6	3	30	14*	15.00	130.43	0	0
Grace Potts	6	5	46	30	15.33	51.68	0	0	7	2	0	0*	–	–	0	0
Elizabeth Russell	5	3	33	23	16.50	91.66	0	0	2	–	–	–	–	–	–	–
Issy Wong	–	–	–	–	–	–	–	–	8	8	106	45	13.25	126.19	0	0
Source: ESPN Cricinfo

=== Bowling ===
Player	Rachael Heyhoe Flint Trophy							Charlotte Edwards Cup						
Player	Matches	Overs	Wickets	Average	Economy	BBI	5wi	Matches	Overs	Wickets	Average	Economy	BBI	5wi
Emily Arlott	4	30.2	6	21.16	4.18	4/36	0	8	32.0	9	23.44	6.59	2/27	0
Hannah Baker	5	35.4	5	39.00	5.46	2/59	0	8	26.0	7	23.14	6.23	2/19	0
Georgia Davis	6	41.5	4	47.75	4.56	2/61	0	–	–	–	–	–	–	–
Ria Fackrell	4	7.0	0	–	6.14	–	0	–	–	–	–	–	–	–
Sarah Glenn	3	18.0	7	8.28	3.22	4/23	0	8	32.0	10	16.60	5.18	3/17	0
Evelyn Jones	6	6.4	1	34.00	5.10	1/20	0	8	–	–	–	–	–	–
Anisha Patel	1	5.0	0	–	4.00	–	0	–	–	–	–	–	–	–
Davina Perrin	5	5.0	3	8.66	5.20	3/26	0	6	1.0	0	–	17.00	–	0
Grace Potts	6	47.2	10	20.60	4.35	2/33	0	7	26.0	12	16.83	7.76	4/36	0
Elizabeth Russell	5	29.0	6	27.83	5.75	3/44	0	2	6.5	2	26.00	7.60	2/24	0
Issy Wong	–	–	–	–	–	–	–	8	30.5	8	24.87	6.45	2/8	0
Source: ESPN Cricinfo

=== Fielding ===
Player	Rachael Heyhoe Flint Trophy			Charlotte Edwards Cup		
Player	Matches	Innings	Catches	Matches	Innings	Catches
Emily Arlott	4	4	2	8	8	2
Hannah Baker	5	5	2	8	8	1
Gabrielle Basketter	1	1	0	–	–	–
Thea Brookes	4	4	1	1	1	0
Clare Boycott	1	1	0	–	–	–
Stephanie Butler	1	1	0	–	–	–
Ami Campbell	6	6	3	8	8	1
Georgia Davis	6	6	1	–	–	–
Gwenan Davies	–	–	–	8	8	5
Ria Fackrell	4	4	0	–	–	–
Abigail Freeborn	6	0	0	8	8	1
Sarah Glenn	3	3	1	8	8	2
Milly Home	2	2	1	–	–	–
Evelyn Jones	6	6	3	8	8	3
Anisha Patel	1	1	0	–	–	–
Davina Perrin	5	5	0	6	6	1
Grace Potts	6	6	0	7	7	3
Elizabeth Russell	5	5	2	2	2	0
Issy Wong	–	–	–	8	8	1
Source: ESPN Cricinfo

=== Wicket-keeping ===
Player	Rachael Heyhoe Flint Trophy				Charlotte Edwards Cup			
Player	Matches	Innings	Catches	Stumpings	Matches	Innings	Catches	Stumpings
Abigail Freeborn	6	6	6	3	8	–	–	–
Amy Jones	–	–	–	–	8	8	8	4
Source: ESPN Cricinfo
