= 2024 Central Sparks season =

English cricket season

Central Sparks
2024 season
- Coach: Lloyd Tennant (April–May); Darren Franklin & Justine Dunce (June–September)
- Captain: Evelyn Jones
- Overseas player: (Australia) Courtney Webb
- RHFT: 7th
- CEC: Semi-finals
- Most runs: RHFT: Evelyn Jones (483); CEC: Davina Perrin (245)
- Most wickets: RHFT: Grace Potts (15) & Hannah Baker (15); CEC: Emily Arlott (14)
- Most catches: RHFT: Katie George (9); CEC: Katie George (7) & Davina Perrin (7)
- Most wicket-keeping dismissals: RHFT: Abigail Freeborn (11); CEC: Abigail Freeborn (10)

The 2024 season was Central Sparks' fifth season, in which they competed in the 50 over Rachael Heyhoe Flint Trophy and the Twenty20 Charlotte Edwards Cup. In the Charlotte Edwards Cup, the side won six of their ten group stage matches, finishing fourth and progressing to the semi-finals, where they lost to The Blaze. In the Rachael Heyhoe Flint Trophy, the side finished seventh in the group, winning five of their fourteen matches.

The side was captained by Evelyn Jones and initially coached by Lloyd Tennant, before he was replaced by Darren Franklin and Justine Dunce in June 2024. They played five home matches apiece at Edgbaston Cricket Ground and New Road, Worcester, and one apiece at Chester Road North Ground, Kidderminster and Scorers, Shirley.

This was Central Sparks' final season in existence, effectively being replaced by a professionalised Warwickshire team under the England and Wales Cricket Board's changes to the structure of women's domestic cricket from 2025 onwards.

== Squad ==
=== Departures ===
On 14 November 2023, Elizabeth Russell announced her retirement from cricket. On 30 April 2024, it was announced that Ellie Anderson had gone on a month-long loan to Western Storm. On 12 June 2024, Anderson's loan was extended until 23 July 2024, and then again on 23 August 2024 until the end of the season. On 24 May 2024, it was announced that the side had loaned Issy Wong to Western Storm for the duration of the Charlotte Edwards Cup. Wong's loan was later extended on 27 June 2024 until the end of July, and then again on 23 August 2024 for one match on 26 August 2024. On 31 August 2024, it was announced that Evelyn Jones had gone on loan to North West Thunder for the remainder of the season.

=== Arrivals ===
On 23 April 2024, the side announced the signing of Courtney Webb as an overseas player, with her stint beginning in May. On 25 August 2024, Meg Austin and Hannah Hardwick were included in a matchday squad for the first time. On 3 September 2024, Sophie Beech was included in a matchday squad for the first time.

=== Personnel and contract changes ===
On 1 November 2023, it was announced that Charis Pavely had signed her first professional contract with the side. On 1 June 2024, it was announced that Head Coach Lloyd Tennant and Assistant Coach Dominic Ostler had left the club, with Darren Franklin and Justine Dunce taking over leadership of the side under the end of the season.

=== Squad list ===
- Age given is at the start of Central Sparks' first match of the season (20 April 2024).

Name	Nationality	Birth date	Batting Style	Bowling Style	Notes
Batters
Meg Austin	England	7 September 2004 (aged 19)	Right-handed	Right-arm leg break	Joined August 2024
Chloe Brewer	England	12 July 2002 (aged 21)	Right-handed	Right-arm medium	
Ami Campbell	England	6 June 1991 (aged 32)	Left-handed	Right-arm medium	
Evelyn Jones	England	8 August 1992 (aged 31)	Left-handed	Left-arm medium	Captain; loaned to North West Thunder in September 2024
Davina Perrin	England	8 September 2006 (aged 17)	Right-handed	Right-arm leg break	
Courtney Webb	Australia	30 November 1999 (aged 24)	Right-handed	Right-arm medium	Overseas player; May to September 2024
All-rounders
Bethan Ellis	England	7 July 1999 (aged 24)	Right-handed	Right-arm medium	
Ria Fackrell	England	16 September 1999 (aged 24)	Right-handed	Right-arm off break	
Katie George	England	7 April 1999 (aged 25)	Right-handed	Left-arm medium	
Charis Pavely	England	25 October 2004 (aged 19)	Left-handed	Slow left-arm orthodox	
Wicket-keepers
Sophie Beech	England	Unknown	Right-handed	—	Joined September 2024
Poppy Davies	England	23 June 2000 (aged 23)	Right-handed	—	
Abigail Freeborn	England	12 November 1996 (aged 27)	Right-handed	—	
Amy Jones	England	13 June 1993 (aged 30)	Right-handed	—	
Bowlers
Ellie Anderson	England	23 February 1994 (aged 30)	Right-handed	Right-arm medium	Loaned to Western Storm from April to September 2024
Emily Arlott	England	23 February 1998 (aged 26)	Right-handed	Right-arm medium	
Hannah Baker	England	3 February 2004 (aged 20)	Right-handed	Right-arm leg break	
Georgia Davis	England	3 June 1999 (aged 24)	Right-handed	Right-arm off break	
Hannah Hardwick	England	1 May 2004 (aged 19)	Right-handed	Right-arm medium	
Anisha Patel	England	17 August 1995 (aged 28)	Right-handed	Right-arm leg break	
Grace Potts	England	12 July 2002 (aged 21)	Right-handed	Right-arm medium	
Issy Wong	England	15 May 2002 (aged 21)	Right-handed	Right-arm medium	Loaned to Western Storm from May to September 2024

== Rachael Heyhoe Flint Trophy ==
=== Season standings ===
Pos	Team	Pld	W	L	T	NR	BP	Pts	NRR
1	Northern Diamonds (Q)	14	9	4	0	1	3	41	0.097
2	South East Stars (Q)	14	9	5	0	0	4	40	0.246
3	Southern Vipers (Q)	14	7	6	0	1	4	34	0.534
4	Sunrisers (Q)	14	7	6	0	1	4	34	−0.122
5	The Blaze	14	7	6	0	1	1	31	−0.176
6	North West Thunder	14	5	8	0	1	3	25	−0.013
7	Central Sparks	14	5	8	0	1	3	25	−0.299
8	Western Storm	14	4	10	0	0	2	18	−0.211

Source: ESPNCricinfo

advanced to the Semi-finals

=== Fixtures ===
20 April 2024
10:30
Scorecard

Central Sparks; 213/9 (50 overs)	v	The Blaze; 135 (41 overs)
Abigail Freeborn 53 (87); Grace Ballinger 3/47 (10 overs)		Nadine de Klerk 43 (65); Hannah Baker 3/29 (8 overs)

Central Sparks won by 78 runs
Edgbaston Cricket Ground, Birmingham
Umpires: Grace Bambury and Rob White

- Central Sparks won the toss and elected to bat.
- Points: Central Sparks 5, The Blaze 0

24 April 2024
10:30
Scorecard

Central Sparks; 172/9 (50 overs)	v	Southern Vipers; 173/3 (38.5 overs)
Katie George 52 (99); Linsey Smith 2/20 (10 overs)		Charli Knott 58*; Ria Fackrell 1/15 (4.5 overs)

Southern Vipers won by 7 wickets
Sir Paul Getty's Ground, Wormsley
Umpires: Ian Blackwell and Rose Dovey

- Southern Vipers won the toss and elected to bowl.
- Points: Southern Vipers 5, Central Sparks 0

27 April 2024
10:30
Scorecard

South East Stars; 268 (49.4 overs)	v	Central Sparks; 119/6 (30 overs)
Paige Scholfield 65 (66); Hannah Baker 5/45 (10 overs)		Issy Wong 34* (43); Ryana MacDonald-Gay 4/18 (8 overs)

South East Stars won by 71 runs (DLS)
County Ground, Beckenham
Umpires: James Tredwell and Sophie McLelland

- South East Stars won the toss and elected to bat.
- Central Sparks innings curtailed at 30 overs due to rain; target was 191.
- Points: South East Stars 5, Central Sparks 0

1 May 2024
10:30
Scorecard

Central Sparks; 213 (50 overs)	v	Sunrisers; 214/5 (39.4 overs)
Abigail Freeborn 93 (145); Kate Coppack 3/26 (8 overs)		Grace Scrivens 118* (123); Bethan Ellis 2/38 (9 overs)

Sunrisers won by 5 wickets
Chester Road North Ground, Kidderminster
Umpires: Joanne Ibbotson and Naeem Ashraf

- Sunrisers won the toss and elected to bowl.
- Points: Sunrisers 5, Central Sparks 0

4 May 2024
10:30
Scorecard

Northern Diamonds; 216 (49.2 overs)	v	Central Sparks; 215 (50 overs)
Erin Burns 49 (63); Ria Fackrell 2/19 (6 overs)		Evelyn Jones 65 (98); Hollie Armitage 3/40 (7 overs)

Northern Diamonds won by 1 run
Edgbaston Cricket Ground, Birmingham
Umpires: Grace Bambury and Anthony Harris

- Northern Diamonds won the toss and elected to bat.
- Points: Northern Diamonds 4, Central Sparks 0

8 May 2024
10:30
Scorecard

North West Thunder; 284/7 (50 overs)	v	Central Sparks; 287/7 (49.4 overs)
Emma Lamb 107 (104); Grace Potts 2/46 (9 overs)		Evelyn Jones 136* (148); Kate Cross 2/50 (9.4 overs)

Central Sparks won by 3 wickets
Old Trafford Cricket Ground, Manchester
Umpires: Amy Clark and Naeem Ashraf

- North West Thunder won the toss and elected to bat.
- Points: Central Sparks 4, North West Thunder 0

30 June 2024
10:30
Scorecard

Central Sparks; 239/8 (50 overs)	v	Northern Diamonds; 242/6 (44 overs)
Katie George 50 (69); Katie Levick 4/46 (10 overs)		Bess Heath 58* (53); Grace Potts 2/34 (5 overs)

Northern Diamonds won by 4 wickets
North Marine Road Ground, Scarborough
Umpires: Gabi Brown and James Middlebrook

- Central Sparks won the toss and elected to bat.
- Points: Northern Diamonds 4, Central Sparks 0

7 July 2024
10:30
Scorecard

Central Sparks; 27/0 (6.3 overs)	v	Sunrisers
Evelyn Jones 14* (17)

No result
Brunton Memorial Ground, Radlett
Umpires: Anthony Harris and Fiona Richards

- Sunrisers won the toss and elected to bowl.
- No further play was possible due to rain.
- Points: Central Sparks 2, Sunrisers 2

10 July 2024
10:30
Scorecard

Central Sparks; 144 (42.4 overs)	v	North West Thunder; 147/2 (29 overs)
Evelyn Jones 38 (62); Tara Norris 4/18 (10 overs)		Emma Lamb 71* (85); Grace Potts 1/23 (6 overs)

North West Thunder won by 8 wickets
New Road, Worcester
Umpires: Grace Bambury and Simon Widdup

- North West Thunder won the toss and elected to bowl.
- Points: North West Thunder 5, Central Sparks 0

12 July 2024
10:30
Scorecard

Western Storm; 284 (49.5 overs)	v	Central Sparks; 102 (25 overs)
Amanda-Jade Wellington 83 (53); Katie George 5/50 (9.5 overs)		Davina Perrin 42 (55); Chloe Skelton 3/8 (5 overs)

Western Storm won by 182 runs
New Road, Worcester
Umpires: Joanne Ibbotson and Simon Widdup

- Central Sparks won the toss and elected to bowl.
- Points: Western Storm 5, Central Sparks 0

26 August 2024
10:30
Scorecard

Central Sparks; 297/3 (50 overs)	v	Western Storm; 152 (33 overs)
Evelyn Jones 130 (163); Ellie Anderson 2/46 (8 overs)		Sophia Smale 53 (47); Georgia Davis 6/23 (10 overs)

Central Sparks won by 145 runs
County Ground, Taunton
Umpires: Gabi Brown and Sue Redfern

- Western Storm won the toss and elected to bowl.
- Points: Central Sparks 5, Western Storm 0

30 August 2024
10:30
Scorecard

Southern Vipers; 183 (48.4 overs)	v	Central Sparks; 184/3 (39.2 overs)
Georgia Elwiss 64* (86); Emily Arlott 4/15 (10 overs)		Evelyn Jones 54 (78); Georgia Adams 2/34 (9.2 overs)

Central Sparks won by 7 wickets
New Road, Worcester
Umpires: Ben Peverall and Grace Bambury

- Central Sparks won the toss and elected to bowl.
- Points: Central Sparks 5, Southern Vipers 0

4 September 2024
10:30
Scorecard

South East Stars; 270 (49.5 overs)	v	Central Sparks; 250/9 (50 overs)
Kira Chathli 80 (78); Katie George 4/47 (10 overs)		Bethan Ellis 57 (83); Alexa Stonehouse 3/37 (8 overs)

South East Stars won by 20 runs
Scorers, Shirley
Umpires: Gabi Brown and Mark Newell

- Central Sparks won the toss and elected to bowl.
- Points: South East Stars 4, Central Sparks 0

6 September 2024
10:30
Scorecard

The Blaze; 166 (46.5 overs)	v	Central Sparks; 170/5 (41.2 overs)
Michaela Kirk 36 (55); Grace Potts 3/38 (8.5 overs)		Katie George 57* (90); Kirstie Gordon 2/24 (10 overs)

Central Sparks won by 5 wickets
Queen's Park, Chesterfield
Umpires: Naeem Ashraf and Rose Dovey

- Central Sparks won the toss and elected to bowl.
- Points: Central Sparks 4, The Blaze 0

=== Tournament statistics ===
==== Batting ====
Player	Matches	Innings	Runs	Average	High score	100s	50s
Evelyn Jones	12	12	483	48.30	136*	2	2
Abigail Freeborn	14	13	370	33.63	93	0	3
Katie George	13	12	321	35.66	57*	0	3
Davina Perrin	12	11	223	20.27	50	0	2
Bethan Ellis	12	9	215	35.83	57	0	1
Chloe Brewer	11	11	202	20.20	54	0	1

Source: ESPN Cricinfo Qualification: 200 runs.

==== Bowling ====
Player	Matches	Overs	Wickets	Average	Economy	BBI	5wi
Grace Potts	13	88.1	15	28.06	4.77	3/38	0
Hannah Baker	12	90.0	15	28.33	4.72	5/45	1
Katie George	13	80.5	14	30.85	5.34	5/50	1
Charis Pavely	6	38.3	13	11.46	3.87	4/31	0
Bethan Ellis	12	57.0	10	28.80	5.05	2/16	0
Ria Fackrell	9	68.3	10	34.60	5.05	2/19	0

Source: ESPN Cricinfo Qualification: 10 wickets.

== Charlotte Edwards Cup ==
=== Season standings ===
Pos	Team	Pld	W	L	T	NR	BP	Pts	NRR
1	The Blaze (Q)	10	9	1	0	0	3	39	0.606
2	South East Stars (Q)	10	7	2	0	1	4	34	0.309
3	Southern Vipers (Q)	10	6	4	0	0	2	26	1.001
4	Central Sparks (Q)	10	6	4	0	0	2	26	0.402
5	North West Thunder	10	3	6	0	1	1	15	−0.727
6	Northern Diamonds	10	3	7	0	0	1	13	−0.067
7	Western Storm	10	2	6	0	2	1	13	−0.659
8	Sunrisers	10	2	8	0	0	0	8	−1.073

Source: ESPNCricinfo

advanced to the Semi-finals

=== Fixtures ===
19 May 2024
14:30
Scorecard

Sunrisers; 138/6 (20 overs)	v	Central Sparks; 142/3 (14 overs)
Alice Macleod 54 (39); Hannah Baker 2/21 (4 overs)		Davina Perrin 79* (48); Mady Villiers 2/37 (3 overs)

Central Sparks won by 7 wickets
New Road, Worcester
Umpires: Fiona Richards and Simon Widdup

- Central Sparks won the toss and elected to bowl.
- Points: Central Sparks 5, Sunrisers 0

22 May 2024
18:30
Scorecard

Central Sparks; 168/6 (20 overs)	v	Western Storm; 147 (18.3 overs)
Abigail Freeborn 68 (40); Chloe Skelton 2/31 (4 overs)		Danielle Gibson 40 (21); Katie George 4/36 (4 overs)

Central Sparks won by 21 runs
County Ground, Taunton
Umpires: James Tredwell and Julia Jarvis

- Western Storm won the toss and elected to bowl.
- Points: Central Sparks 4, Western Storm 0

27 May 2024
14:30
Scorecard

Northern Diamonds; 80/9 (11 overs)	v	Central Sparks; 81/7 (11 overs)
Erin Burns 30 (18); Grace Potts 3/15 (2 overs)		Evelyn Jones 26* (18); Rachel Slater 2/10 (2 overs)

Central Sparks won by 3 wickets
Headingley Cricket Ground, Leeds
Umpires: Amy Clark and Simon Widdup

- Central Sparks won the toss and elected to bowl.
- Match reduced to 11 overs per side due to rain.
- Points: Central Sparks 4, Northern Diamonds 0

30 May 2024
13:30
Scorecard

Central Sparks; 121/8 (20 overs)	v	North West Thunder; 125/7 (19 overs)
Emily Arlott 28 (22); Phoebe Graham 3/16 (4 overs)		Fi Morris 43 (38); Georgia Davis 2/19 (3 overs)

North West Thunder won by 3 wickets
Old Trafford Cricket Ground, Manchester
Umpires: Joanne Ibbotson and Simon Widdup

- North West Thunder won the toss and elected to bat.
- Points: North West Thunder 4, Central Sparks 0

31 May 2024
14:30
Scorecard

The Blaze; 134/6 (20 overs)	v	Central Sparks; 124/7 (20 overs)
Kathryn Bryce 57 (47); Emily Arlott 2/23 (4 overs)		Katie George 28* (25); Kirstie Gordon 2/22 (4 overs)

The Blaze won by 10 runs
Trent Bridge, Nottingham
Umpires: Amy Clark and Anthony Harris

- Central Sparks won the toss and elected to bowl.
- Points: The Blaze 4, Central Sparks 0

8 June 2024
11:30
Scorecard

Northern Diamonds; 137/7 (20 overs)	v	Central Sparks; 124/8 (20 overs)
Hollie Armitage 62 (49); Hannah Baker 3/24 (4 overs)		Amy Jones 39 (30); Katie Levick 2/32 (4 overs)

Northern Diamonds won by 13 runs
Edgbaston Cricket Ground, Birmingham
Umpires: Chris Watts and Rose Dovey

- Central Sparks won the toss and elected to bowl.
- Points: Northern Diamonds 4, Central Sparks 0

9 June 2024
11:00
Scorecard

South East Stars; 122/8 (20 overs)	v	Central Sparks; 123/7 (19.2 overs)
Sophia Dunkley 58 (49); Emily Arlott 4/21 (4 overs)		Evelyn Jones 43 (52); Matilda Corteen-Coleman 3/14 (4 overs)

Central Sparks won by 3 wickets
St Lawrence Ground, Canterbury
Umpires: James Tredwell and Julia Jarvis

- South East Stars won the toss and elected to bat.
- Emily Arlott took a hat-trick.
- Points: Central Sparks 4, South East Stars 0

14 June 2024
15:00
Scorecard

North West Thunder; 146/6 (20 overs)	v	Central Sparks; 150/2 (20 overs)
Seren Smale 88* (61); Grace Potts 2/18 (4 overs)		Abigail Freeborn 71* (57); Kate Cross 1/19 (4 overs)

Central Sparks won by 8 wickets
Edgbaston Cricket Ground, Birmingham
Umpires: Gabi Brown and Hassan Adnan

- Central Sparks won the toss and elected to bowl.
- Points: Central Sparks 4, North West Thunder 0

16 June 2024
10:30
Scorecard

Southern Vipers; 98 (17.5 overs)	v	Central Sparks; 99/5 (14.5 overs)
Rhianna Southby 19 (20); Bethan Ellis 2/11 (3 overs)		Davina Perrin 26 (17); Linsey Smith 2/13 (4 overs)

Central Sparks won by 5 wickets
New Road, Worcester
Umpires: Anthony Harris and Fiona Richards

- Central Sparks won the toss and elected to bowl.
- Points: Central Sparks 5, Southern Vipers 0

19 June 2024
11:30
Scorecard

Central Sparks; 138/8 (20 overs)	v	The Blaze; 139/5 (19.2 overs)
Abigail Freeborn 39 (32); Josie Groves 2/13 (2 overs)		Marie Kelly 89* (63); Grace Potts 1/16 (3 overs)

The Blaze won by 5 wickets
Edgbaston Cricket Ground, Birmingham
Umpires: Gabi Brown and Sue Redfern

- Central Sparks won the toss and elected to bat.
- Points: The Blaze 4, Central Sparks 0

==== Semi-final ====
22 June 2024
11:00 BST
Scorecard

Central Sparks; 140/9 (20 overs)	v	The Blaze; 142/5 (18 overs)
Courtney Webb 45* (31); Josie Groves 2/16 (4 overs)		Kathryn Bryce 44 (39); Hannah Baker 3/24 (4 overs)

The Blaze won by 5 wickets
County Cricket Ground, Derby
Umpires: Rose Dovey and Simon Widdup
Player of the match: Kathryn Bryce (The Blaze)

- The Blaze won the toss and elected to bowl.

=== Tournament statistics ===
==== Batting ====
Player	Matches	Innings	Runs	Average	High score	100s	50s
Davina Perrin	11	11	245	24.50	79*	0	1
Abigail Freeborn	11	11	239	23.90	71*	0	2
Courtney Webb	11	10	197	32.83	45*	0	0
Evelyn Jones	9	9	190	23.75	43	0	0
Amy Jones	4	4	168	56.00	67*	0	1

Source: ESPN Cricinfo Qualification: 150 runs.

==== Bowling ====
Player	Matches	Overs	Wickets	Average	Economy	BBI	5wi
Emily Arlott	10	32.2	14	16.14	6.98	4/21	0
Katie George	11	34.5	13	19.07	7.11	4/36	0
Grace Potts	11	34.0	12	18.41	6.50	3/15	0
Hannah Baker	10	37.0	12	18.41	6.64	3/24	0
Georgia Davis	11	34.3	10	24.60	6.64	3/23	0

Source: ESPN Cricinfo Qualification: 10 wickets.

== Season statistics ==
=== Batting ===
Player	Rachael Heyhoe Flint Trophy								Charlotte Edwards Cup							
Player	Matches	Innings	Runs	High score	Average	Strike rate	100s	50s	Matches	Innings	Runs	High score	Average	Strike rate	100s	50s
Emily Arlott	10	7	50	15	7.14	56.17	0	0	10	8	77	28	12.83	122.22	0	0
Meg Austin	2	2	21	14	10.50	55.26	0	0	–	–	–	–	–	–	–	–
Hannah Baker	12	6	8	4	2.66	27.58	0	0	10	1	0	0*	–	0.00	0	0
Chloe Brewer	11	11	202	54	20.20	59.94	0	1	3	3	15	14	5.00	68.18	0	0
Ami Campbell	8	8	107	48	13.37	68.15	0	0	6	6	57	21	9.50	111.76	0	0
Georgia Davis	6	3	26	20*	13.00	63.41	0	0	11	6	12	5*	6.00	63.15	0	0
Bethan Ellis	12	9	215	57	35.83	70.49	0	1	3	1	3	3*	–	42.85	0	0
Ria Fackrell	9	7	75	39	18.75	72.81	0	0	1	–	–	–	–	–	–	–
Abigail Freeborn	14	13	370	93	33.63	62.92	0	3	11	11	239	71*	23.90	120.70	0	2
Katie George	13	12	321	57*	35.66	74.13	0	3	11	9	75	28*	9.37	88.23	0	0
Hannah Hardwick	2	–	–	–	–	–	–	–	–	–	–	–	–	–	–	–
Amy Jones	–	–	–	–	–	–	–	–	4	4	168	67*	56.00	129.23	0	1
Evelyn Jones	12	12	483	136*	48.30	71.76	2	2	9	9	190	43	23.75	95.47	0	0
Charis Pavely	6	4	36	13*	12.00	39.13	0	0	9	8	59	27*	9.83	86.76	0	0
Davina Perrin	12	11	223	50	20.27	67.37	0	2	11	11	245	79*	24.50	133.15	0	1
Grace Potts	13	7	35	13*	11.66	50.72	0	0	11	3	5	2*	2.50	55.55	0	0
Courtney Webb	7	6	138	40	23.00	84.14	0	0	11	10	197	45*	32.83	119.39	0	0
Issy Wong	5	5	53	34*	13.25	73.61	0	0	–	–	–	–	–	–	–	–
Source: ESPN Cricinfo

=== Bowling ===
Player	Rachael Heyhoe Flint Trophy							Charlotte Edwards Cup						
Player	Matches	Overs	Wickets	Average	Economy	BBI	5wi	Matches	Overs	Wickets	Average	Economy	BBI	5wi
Emily Arlott	10	58.0	9	24.77	3.84	4/15	0	10	32.2	14	16.14	6.98	4/21	0
Hannah Baker	12	90.0	15	28.33	4.72	5/45	1	10	37.0	12	20.50	6.64	3/24	0
Georgia Davis	6	42.0	8	21.25	4.04	6/23	1	11	34.3	10	24.60	7.13	3/23	0
Bethan Ellis	12	57.0	10	28.80	5.05	2/16	0	3	5.0	3	9.66	5.80	2/11	0
Ria Fackrell	9	68.3	10	34.60	5.05	2/19	0	1	3.0	2	6.50	4.33	2/13	0
Katie George	13	80.5	14	30.85	5.34	5/50	1	11	34.5	13	19.07	7.11	4/36	0
Hannah Hardwick	2	8.0	2	17.50	4.37	2/20	0	–	–	–	–	–	–	–
Charis Pavely	6	38.3	13	11.46	3.87	4/31	0	9	18.0	7	18.57	7.22	1/8	0
Davina Perrin	12	4.0	0	–	7.25	–	0	11	–	–	–	–	–	–
Grace Potts	13	88.1	15	28.06	4.77	3/38	0	11	34.0	12	18.41	6.50	3/15	0
Courtney Webb	7	2.0	0	–	6.00	–	0	11	5.0	1	34.00	6.80	1/14	0
Issy Wong	5	32.4	3	56.33	5.17	1/25	0	–	–	–	–	–	–	–
Source: ESPN Cricinfo

=== Fielding ===
Player	Rachael Heyhoe Flint Trophy			Charlotte Edwards Cup		
Player	Matches	Innings	Catches	Matches	Innings	Catches
Emily Arlott	10	9	1	10	10	3
Meg Austin	2	2	0	–	–	–
Hannah Baker	12	11	3	10	10	1
Chloe Brewer	11	10	1	3	3	1
Ami Campbell	8	8	2	6	6	2
Georgia Davis	6	5	2	11	11	1
Bethan Ellis	12	11	2	3	3	0
Ria Fackrell	9	9	4	1	1	1
Abigail Freeborn	14	–	–	11	3	1
Katie George	13	12	9	11	11	7
Hannah Hardwick	2	2	0	–	–	–
Amy Jones	–	–	–	4	1	0
Evelyn Jones	12	11	5	9	9	6
Charis Pavely	6	6	4	9	9	5
Davina Perrin	12	11	4	11	11	7
Grace Potts	13	12	3	11	11	0
Courtney Webb	7	6	3	11	11	3
Issy Wong	5	5	0	–	–	–
Source: ESPN Cricinfo

=== Wicket-keeping ===
Player	Rachael Heyhoe Flint Trophy				Charlotte Edwards Cup			
Player	Matches	Innings	Catches	Stumpings	Matches	Innings	Catches	Stumpings
Abigail Freeborn	14	13	9	2	11	8	7	3
Amy Jones	–	–	–	–	4	3	1	0
Source: ESPN Cricinfo
