= Hannah Hardwick =

English cricketer

Personal information
- Full name: Hannah Jay Hardwick
- Born: 1 May 2004 (age 22); Dudley, West Midlands, England
- Batting: Right-handed
- Bowling: Right-arm medium
- Role: Bowler

Domestic team information
- Years: Team
- 2021–2025: Worcestershire
- 2023: Trent Rockets
- 2024: Central Sparks
- 2026–present: Hampshire

Career statistics
Competition	WLA	WT20
Matches	5	15
Runs scored	26	61
Batting average	8.66	15.25
100s/50s	0/0	0/1
Top score	13	57
Balls bowled	120	162
Wickets	2	6
Bowling average	44.00	39.00
5 wickets in innings	0	0
10 wickets in match	0	0
Best bowling	2/20	2/17
Catches/stumpings	0/–	3/–
- Source: CricketArchive, 16 October 2024

Hannah Jay Hardwick (born 1 May 2004) is an English cricketer who currently plays for Hampshire. She plays as a right-arm medium bowler.

== Early life ==
Hardwick was born on 1 May 2004 in Dudley, West Midlands.

== Domestic career ==
Hardwick made her county debut in 2021, for Worcestershire against Berkshire. She took two wickets at an average of 42.50 in the 2021 Women's Twenty20 Cup. In 2024, she scored her maiden half-century, with 57 from 41 deliveries against Huntingdonshire in the Twenty20 Cup.

Hardwick was named in the Central Sparks Academy in 2021, and was subsequently named in the academy in 2022, 2023 and 2024. In 2023, she was signed in The Hundred as a replacement for the injured Grace Potts. On 25 August 2024, Hardwick was including in a senior Central Sparks matchday squad for the first time. She made her debut for the side the following day, against Western Storm in the Rachael Heyhoe Flint Trophy, bowling two overs.
