= 2019 Lancashire Thunder season =

Lancashire Thunder
2019 season
- Coach: Mark McInnes
- Captain: Kate Cross
- Overseas player: Harmanpreet Kaur; Suné Luus; Tahlia McGrath
- WCSL: Group stage, 6th
- Most runs: Harmanpreet Kaur (261)
- Most wickets: Sophie Ecclestone (12)
- Most catches: Harmanpreet Kaur (5)
- Most wicket-keeping dismissals: Eleanor Threlkeld (5)

The 2019 season was Lancashire Thunder's fourth and final season, in which they competed in the final edition of the Women's Cricket Super League, a Twenty20 competition. The side finished bottom of the group stage, losing nine of their ten matches, with the other ending in a tie.

The side was captained by Kate Cross and coached by Mark McInnes. They played two home matches at Aigburth Cricket Ground and one apiece at Old Trafford, Stanley Park and Chester Boughton Hall. Following the season, women's domestic cricket in England was reformed, with the creation of new "regional hubs", with Lancashire Thunder replaced by North West Thunder, which retained some elements of the original team but represent a larger area.

== Squad ==
Lancashire Thunder's 15-player squad is listed below. Age given is at the start of Lancashire Thunder's first match of the season (6 August 2019).

Name	Nationality	Birth date	Batting Style	Bowling Style	Notes
Batters
Georgie Boyce	England	4 October 1998 (age 27)	Right-handed	Right-arm medium	
Danielle Collins	England	7 June 2000 (age 26)	Left-handed	Right-arm medium	
Ria Fackrell	England	16 September 1999 (age 26)	Right-handed	Right-arm off break	
Evelyn Jones	England	8 August 1992 (age 34)	Left-handed	Left-arm medium	
All-rounders
Natalie Brown	England	16 October 1990 (age 35)	Right-handed	Right-arm medium	
Sophia Dunkley	England	16 July 1998 (age 28)	Right-handed	Right-arm leg break	
Harmanpreet Kaur	India	8 March 1989 (age 37)	Right-handed	Right-arm off break	Overseas player
Emma Lamb	England	16 December 1997 (age 28)	Right-handed	Right-arm off break	
Suné Luus	South Africa	5 January 1996 (age 30)	Right-handed	Right-arm leg break	Overseas player
Tahlia McGrath	Australia	10 November 1995 (age 30)	Right-handed	Right-arm medium	Overseas player
Wicket-keepers
Eleanor Threlkeld	England	16 November 1998 (age 27)	Right-handed	—	
Bowlers
Kate Cross	England	3 October 1991 (age 34)	Right-handed	Right-arm medium-fast	Captain
Alice Dyson	England	28 January 1999 (age 27)	Right-handed	Right-arm medium	
Sophie Ecclestone	England	6 May 1999 (age 27)	Right-handed	Slow left-arm orthodox	
Alex Hartley	England	6 September 1993 (age 33)	Right-handed	Slow left-arm orthodox	

== Women's Cricket Super League ==
=== Season standings ===
Pos	Team	Pld	W	L	T	NR	BP	Pts	NRR
1	Western Storm	10	9	1	0	0	3	39	1.109
2	Loughborough Lightning	10	7	3	0	0	4	32	0.792
3	Southern Vipers	10	4	4	1	1	2	22	0.425
4	Yorkshire Diamonds	10	5	5	0	0	0	20	−0.456
5	Surrey Stars	10	3	6	0	1	2	16	−0.857
6	Lancashire Thunder	10	0	9	1	0	0	2	−1.194

Source: ESPN Cricinfo

Advanced to the Final.
Advanced to the Semi-final.

=== League stage ===
6 August 2019
14:30
Scorecard

Southern Vipers; 166/7 (20 overs)	v	Lancashire Thunder; 132 (19.4 overs)
Danni Wyatt 54 (39); Alex Hartley 2/34 (4 overs)		Georgie Boyce 43 (41); Tash Farrant 3/18 (4 overs)

Southern Vipers won by 34 runs
Aigburth Cricket Ground, Liverpool
Umpires: Sue Redfern and Neil Pratt
Player of the match: Danni Wyatt (Southern Vipers)

- Southern Vipers won the toss and elected to bat.
- Points: Southern Vipers 5, Lancashire Thunder 0

8 August 2019
14:30
Scorecard

Lancashire Thunder; 120/7 (20 overs)	v	Surrey Stars; 124/2 (14.2 overs)
Harmanpreet Kaur 58* (47); Dane van Niekerk 3/20 (4 overs)		Lizelle Lee 66 (45); Emma Lamb 1/16 (2 overs)

Surrey Stars won by 8 wickets
Woodbridge Road, Guildford
Umpires: Mark Newell and Rob White
Player of the match: Lizelle Lee (Surrey Stars)

- Surrey Stars won the toss and elected to field.
- Points: Surrey Stars 5, Lancashire Thunder 0

10 August 2019
15:00
Scorecard

Lancashire Thunder; 141/6 (20 overs)	v	Western Storm; 143/4 (19.3 overs)
Suné Luus 62 (48); Claire Nicholas 2/25 (4 overs)		Fran Wilson 54 (35); Sophie Ecclestone 1/19 (4 overs)

Western Storm won by 6 wickets
County Ground, Taunton
Umpires: Jeff Evans and Alex Wharf
Player of the match: Fran Wilson (Western Storm)

- Lancashire Thunder won the toss and elected to bat.
- Points: Western Storm 4, Lancashire Thunder 0

13 August 2019
14:30
Scorecard

Yorkshire Diamonds; 151/6 (20 overs)	v	Lancashire Thunder; 142 (19.1 overs)
Lauren Winfield 56 (45); Kate Cross 2/31 (4 overs)		Harmanpreet Kaur 37 (37); Katie George 2/16 (2 overs)

Yorkshire Diamonds won by 9 runs
Aigburth Cricket Ground, Liverpool
Umpires: Tom Lungley and Ian Ramage
Player of the match: Lauren Winfield (Yorkshire Diamonds)

- Yorkshire Diamonds won the toss and elected to bat.
- Points: Yorkshire Diamonds 4, Lancashire Thunder 0

15 August 2019
19:00
Scorecard

Lancashire Thunder; 132/7 (20 overs)	v	Southern Vipers; 132/8 (20 overs)
Harmanpreet Kaur 34 (33); Amanda-Jade Wellington 3/22 (4 overs)		Stafanie Taylor 51 (43); Emma Lamb 3/33 (4 overs)

Match Tied
County Ground, Hove
Umpires: Mark Newell and Mary Waldron
Player of the match: Stafanie Taylor (Southern Vipers)

- Lancashire Thunder won the toss and elected to bat.
- Points: Southern Vipers 2, Lancashire Thunder 2

18 August 2019
14:30
Scorecard

Lancashire Thunder; 159/8 (20 overs)	v	Western Storm; 160/5 (19.5 overs)
Harmanpreet Kaur 50 (37); Anya Shrubsole 3/36 (4 overs)		Smriti Mandhana 72 (43); Sophie Ecclestone 2/32 (4 overs)

Western Storm won by 5 wickets
Chester Boughton Hall CC, Chester
Umpires: Hassan Adnan and Sue Redfern
Player of the match: Smriti Mandhana (Western Storm)

- Lancashire Thunder won the toss and elected to bat.
- Points: Western Storm 4, Lancashire Thunder 0

20 August 2019
18:30
Scorecard

Loughborough Lightning; 157/7 (20 overs)	v	Lancashire Thunder; 74/6 (13.4 overs)
Georgia Adams 50 (33); Sophie Ecclestone 3/17 (4 overs)		Suné Luus 30 (33); Kirstie Gordon 3/18 (3.4 overs)

Loughborough Lightning won by 35 runs (DLS)
Old Trafford, Manchester
Umpires: Tim Robinson and Nick Cook
Player of the match: Georgia Adams (Loughborough Lightning)

- Lancashire Thunder won the toss and elected to field.
- Points: Loughborough Lightning 5, Lancashire Thunder 0

23 August 2019
14:30
Scorecard

Lancashire Thunder; 164/5 (20 overs)	v	Yorkshire Diamonds; 168/6 (18.5 overs)
Eleanor Threlkeld 52 (37); Katie Levick 2/19 (4 overs)		Alyssa Healy 77 (38); Sophie Ecclestone 2/18 (4 overs)

Yorkshire Diamonds won by 4 wickets
North Marine Road Ground, Scarborough
Umpires: James Middlebrook and Chris Watts
Player of the match: Alyssa Healy (Yorkshire Diamonds)

- Lancashire Thunder won the toss and elected to bat.
- Points: Yorkshire Diamonds 4, Lancashire Thunder 0

25 August 2019
11:30
Scorecard

Lancashire Thunder; 122 (19.5 overs)	v	Loughborough Lightning; 123/2 (16.1 overs)
Sophia Dunkley 29 (21); Jenny Gunn 3/14 (3.5 overs)		Amy Jones 66 (52); Alex Hartley 1/21 (3.1 overs)

Loughborough Lightning won by 8 wickets
Trent Bridge, Nottingham
Umpires: Graham Lloyd and Jeremy Lloyds
Player of the match: Amy Jones (Loughborough Lightning)

- Lancashire Thunder won the toss and elected to bat.
- Points: Loughborough Lightning 4, Lancashire Thunder 0

28 August 2019
14:30
Scorecard

Surrey Stars; 132/1 (9 overs)	v	Lancashire Thunder; 97/7 (9 overs)
Lizelle Lee 75 (28); Kate Cross 1/42 (2 overs)		Tahlia McGrath 41 (18); Hannah Jones 3/24 (2 overs)

Surrey Stars won by 35 runs
Stanley Park, Blackpool
Umpires: Sue Redfern and Paul Baldwin
Player of the match: Lizelle Lee (Surrey Stars)

- Lancashire Thunder won the toss and elected to field.
- Match reduced to 9 overs per side due to rain.
- Points: Surrey Stars 5, Lancashire Thunder 0

== Statistics ==
=== Batting ===
Player	Matches	Innings	NO	Runs	HS	Average	Strike rate	100s	50s	4s	6s
Georgie Boyce	7	6	0	77	43	12.83	93.90	0	0	7	2
Natalie Brown	2	1	0	14	14	14.00	100.00	0	0	0	1
Kate Cross	10	6	2	70	22*	17.50	162.79	0	0	9	2
Sophia Dunkley	10	10	0	89	29	8.90	105.95	0	0	9	2
Alice Dyson	3	–	–	–	–	–	–	–	–	–	–
Sophie Ecclestone	10	10	3	73	15	10.42	119.67	0	0	4	4
Ria Fackrell	3	2	1	10	7	10.00	71.42	0	0	0	0
Alex Hartley	10	3	2	12	12*	12.00	100.00	0	0	1	0
Evelyn Jones	5	4	1	23	13	7.66	82.14	0	0	2	0
Harmanpreet Kaur	10	10	1	261	58*	29.00	113.47	0	2	25	10
Emma Lamb	10	10	4	115	32	19.16	138.55	0	0	13	2
Suné Luus	10	10	0	156	62	15.60	95.70	0	1	15	5
Tahlia McGrath	10	10	0	219	44	21.90	105.28	0	0	27	6
Eleanor Threlkeld	10	8	0	91	52	11.37	128.16	0	1	11	2
Source: ESPN Cricinfo

=== Bowling ===
Player	Matches	Innings	Overs	Maidens	Runs	Wickets	BBI	Average	Economy	Strike rate
Georgie Boyce	7	1	1.0	0	13	0	–	–	13.00	–
Natalie Brown	2	2	3.0	0	15	1	1/12	15.00	5.00	18.0
Kate Cross	10	10	34.1	0	293	11	2/13	26.63	8.57	18.6
Sophia Dunkley	10	8	17.0	0	126	2	1/11	63.00	7.41	51.0
Alice Dyson	3	3	4.0	0	39	0	–	–	9.75	–
Sophie Ecclestone	10	10	37.0	0	238	12	3/17	19.83	6.43	18.5
Alex Hartley	10	10	30.3	0	260	6	2/34	43.33	8.52	30.5
Harmanpreet Kaur	10	3	6.0	0	43	0	–	–	7.16	–
Emma Lamb	10	10	31.0	0	258	10	3/33	25.80	8.32	18.6
Suné Luus	10	5	5.0	0	51	0	–	–	10.50	–
Tahlia McGrath	10	6	9.0	0	100	0	–	–	11.11	–
Source: ESPN Cricinfo

=== Fielding ===
Player	Matches	Innings	Catches
Georgie Boyce	7	7	1
Natalie Brown	2	2	0
Kate Cross	10	10	1
Sophia Dunkley	10	10	4
Alice Dyson	3	3	1
Sophie Ecclestone	10	10	0
Ria Fackrell	3	3	0
Alex Hartley	10	10	1
Evelyn Jones	5	5	1
Harmanpreet Kaur	10	10	5
Emma Lamb	10	10	3
Suné Luus	10	10	4
Tahlia McGrath	10	10	3
Source: ESPN Cricinfo

=== Wicket-keeping ===
Player	Matches	Innings	Catches	Stumpings
Eleanor Threlkeld	10	10	1	4
Source: ESPN Cricinfo
