= Brian Shantry =

English cricketer

Personal information
- Full name: Brian Keith Shantry
- Born: 26 May 1955 (age 71); Southmead, Bristol, England
- Batting: Left-handed
- Bowling: Left-arm fast-medium
- Relatives: Adam Shantry (son); Jack Shantry (son)

Domestic team information
- Years: Team
- 1978–1979: Gloucestershire
- 1983–1986: Dorset
- 1990–1996: Shropshire

Career statistics
| Competition | First-class | List A |
|---|---|---|
| Matches | 3 | 9 |
| Runs scored | – | 17 |
| Batting average | – | 5.66 |
| 100s/50s | – | 0/0 |
| Top score | – | 6 |
| Balls bowled | 234 | 428 |
| Wickets | 3 | 5 |
| Bowling average | 55.66 | 59.80 |
| 5 wickets in innings | 0 | 0 |
| 10 wickets in match | 0 | 0 |
| Best bowling | 2/63 | 2/36 |
| Catches/stumpings | 0/– | 0/– |
- Source: Cricinfo, 18 March 2010

Brian Keith Shantry (born 26 May 1955) is a former English cricketer. Shantry was a left-handed batsman who bowled left-arm fast-medium.

Shantry made his first-class debut for Gloucestershire against Somerset in the 1978 County Championship. Shantry played 2 further first-class matches against Worcestershire in 1978 and Oxford University in 1979.

In the same year that he made his first-class debut for Gloucestershire, he made his List-A debut for the county against Somerset. Shantry made 5 List-A appearances for Gloucestershire from 1978 to 1979, with his final List-A match for the county coming against Somerset.

In 1983 Shantry made his List-A debut for Dorset against Essex in the 1st round of the 1983 NatWest Trophy. Shantry played 2 List-A matches for Dorset, with his second and final List-A match for Dorset coming against Somerset in 1986.

In the same season that Shantry made his debut for Dorset, he also made his debut for the county in the 1983 Minor Counties Championship against Buckinghamshire. Shantry played 13 Minor Counties matches for Dorset, with his final match for the county coming against Cornwall in 1985.

In 1990 Shantry made his debut for Shropshire in a List-A match against Derbyshire in the 1990 NatWest Trophy. Shantry represented Shropshire in a further List-A match in 1993 against Somerset in the NatWest Trophy. He also made his Minor Counties Championship for Shropshire in 1990 against Wales Minor Counties. Shantry played 12 Minor County matches for Shropshire from 1990 to 1996, with his final match for the county coming against Herefordshire.

== Family ==
Shantry's sons Adam and Jack both played first-class cricket. Both now coach cricket at Shrewsbury School.
