= Adam Shantry =

English cricketer

Personal information
- Full name: Adam John Shantry
- Born: 13 November 1982 (age 43); Bristol, England
- Nickname: Shants
- Height: 190 cm (6 ft 3 in)
- Batting: Left-handed
- Bowling: Left-arm medium-fast
- Role: Bowler
- Relatives: Brian Shantry (father); Jack Shantry (brother)

Domestic team information
- Years: Team
- 2002–2004: Northamptonshire
- 2005–2007: Warwickshire
- 2008–2011: Glamorgan (squad no. 5)
- FC debut: 9 May 2003 Northants v Cambridge University
- LA debut: 29 August 2002 Northamptonshire Cricket Board v Yorkshire Cricket Board

Career statistics
Competition	FC	LA	T20
Matches	25	11	1
Runs scored	345	48	–
Batting average	16.42	16.00	–
100s/50s	1/0	0/0	–
Top score	100	19*	–
Balls bowled	3,378	360	12
Wickets	78	12	0
Bowling average	22.11	24.66	–
5 wickets in innings	4	1	–
10 wickets in match	1	0	–
Best bowling	5/49	5/37	–
Catches/stumpings	6/–	6/–	0/–
- Source: , 9 August 2009

Adam John Shantry (born 13 November 1982) is an English cricketer. He is a left-handed batsman and a left-arm medium-fast bowler.

Shantry played for Shropshire as a youngster, joining Northamptonshire in 2003 and then moving to Warwickshire two years later. In 2007 he played two first-class matches for Warwickshire taking four wickets but he was released at the end of the season. He subsequently signed a two-year deal with Glamorgan. and scored his first ever 100 against Leicestershire on 6 August 2009 he also has a SC. He announced his retirement in August 2011, having failed to recover from a persistent knee injury. In all he claimed 90 wickets in 32 first-class games at an average 24.60.

Born in Bristol, Shantry's father, Brian also played county cricket, for Gloucestershire.

Shantry is a devoted Bristol City fan and follows them around the country in the cricket off-season. Adam and his family live in Shrewsbury. In January 2017 he was promoted to the role of Cricket Professional at Shrewsbury School. His wife is a Maths teacher at the same school.

In September 2013, Shantry was part of a group who swam the English Channel in memory of former teammate Tom Maynard, who died in 2012. He hoped to raise £10,000 for the Tom Maynard Trust.
