= 2022 Rachael Heyhoe Flint Trophy =

English cricket season

- Dates: 2 July 2022 – 25 September 2022
- Administrator: England and Wales Cricket Board
- Cricket format: 50-over cricket
- Tournament format(s): Round robin and knock-out finals
- Champions: Northern Diamonds (1st title)
- Participants: 8
- Matches: 30
- Player of the series: Lauren Winfield-Hill (Diamonds)
- Most runs: Lauren Winfield-Hill (470)
- Most wickets: Grace Scrivens (13); Linsey Smith (13)
- Official website: ECB

The 2022 Rachael Heyhoe Flint Trophy was the third edition of the Rachael Heyhoe Flint Trophy, an English women's cricket 50-over domestic competition, which took place between 2 July and 25 September 2022. It featured eight teams playing in a round-robin group, followed by a knock-out round. The holders were the Southern Vipers, who won the first two editions of the competition. It ran alongside the Charlotte Edwards Cup. The tournament was named after former England captain Rachael Heyhoe Flint, Baroness Heyhoe-Flint, who died in 2017.

Northern Diamonds finished top of the group stage, qualifying directly for the final. South East Stars and Southern Vipers qualified for the play-off, which was won by Vipers to set up the third Vipers versus Diamonds final in the Rachael Heyhoe Flint Trophy in its three years of existence. Northern Diamonds won the final by two runs to claim their first title.

== Format ==
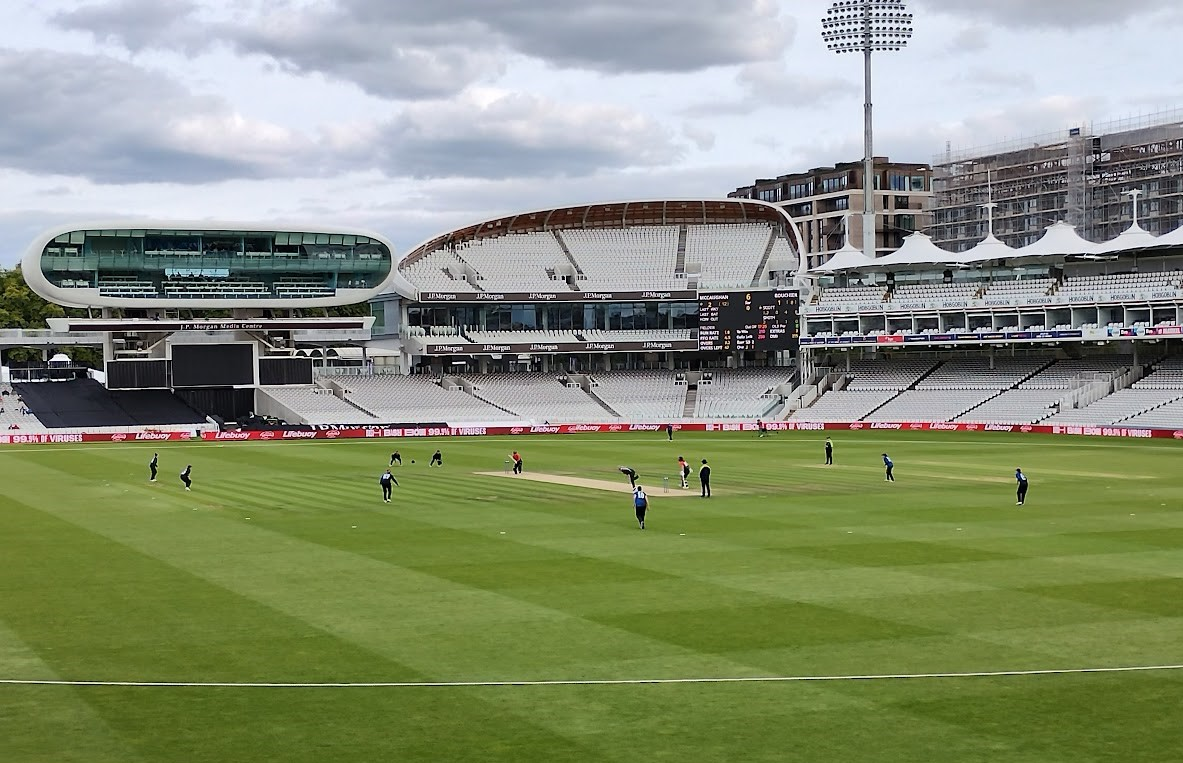
The final of the 2022 Rachael Heyhoe Flint Trophy, taking place at Lord's.

Teams played each other once in a group of eight, with the top three qualifying for the knock-out stage. The second-placed team played the third-placed team in a play-off, with the winner advancing to play the first-placed team in the final. The final was held at Lord's for the first time.

== Teams ==
The teams were as follows:

- Central Sparks (representing Warwickshire, Worcestershire, Herefordshire, Shropshire and Staffordshire)
- Lightning (representing Loughborough University, Derbyshire, Leicestershire, Nottinghamshire and Lincolnshire)
- Northern Diamonds (representing Yorkshire, Durham and Northumberland)
- North West Thunder (representing Lancashire, Cheshire and Cumbria)
- South East Stars (representing Surrey and Kent)
- Southern Vipers (representing Hampshire, Sussex, Berkshire, Buckinghamshire, Dorset, Isle of Wight and Oxfordshire)
- Sunrisers (representing Middlesex, Essex, Northamptonshire, Bedfordshire, Cambridgeshire, Hertfordshire, Huntingdonshire, Norfolk and Suffolk)
- Western Storm (representing Glamorgan, Gloucestershire, Somerset, Cornwall, Devon, Wiltshire and Cricket Wales)

== Standings ==
Teams received 4 points for a win. A bonus point was given where the winning team's run rate was 1.25 or greater times that of the opposition. In case of a tie in the standings, the following tiebreakers were applied in order: highest net run rate, team that scored the most points in matches involving the tied parties, better bowling strike rate, drawing of lots.

Pos	Team	Pld	W	L	T	NR	BP	Pts	NRR
1	Northern Diamonds (Q)	7	6	0	0	1	2	28	0.851
2	South East Stars (Q)	7	5	1	0	1	4	26	0.687
3	Southern Vipers (Q)	7	5	1	0	1	2	24	0.762
4	Western Storm	7	3	3	0	1	1	15	−0.214
5	Central Sparks	7	2	4	0	1	1	11	0.073
6	Lightning	7	2	4	0	1	1	11	−0.630
7	North West Thunder	7	1	5	0	1	0	6	−0.366
8	Sunrisers	7	0	6	0	1	0	2	−1.046

Source: England and Wales Cricket Board

advanced to final advanced to the play-off

== Fixtures ==
=== Group stage ===
2 July 2022
10:30 BST
Scorecard

Central Sparks; 163/7 (36 overs)	v	Southern Vipers; 75/3 (9.4 overs)
Evelyn Jones 39 (70); Paige Scholfield 2/20 (4 overs)		Danni Wyatt 36* (24); Grace Potts 1/10 (2 overs); Sarah Glenn 1/10 (2 overs)

Southern Vipers won by 7 wickets (DLS)
Edgbaston Foundation Ground, Birmingham
Umpires: Joanne Ibbotson and Tom Lungley

- Southern Vipers won the toss and elected to field.
- Central Sparks innings reduced to 36 overs due to rain.
- Southern Vipers innings reduced to 10 overs due to rain; target was 70.
- Points: Southern Vipers 4, Central Sparks 0

2 July 2022
10:30 BST
Scorecard

Western Storm; 260/9 (50 overs)	v	Lightning; 166/9 (34.2 overs)
Sophie Luff 48 (66); Piepa Cleary 3/45 (10 overs)		Lucy Higham 34 (39); Lauren Filer 3/35 (8 overs)

Western Storm won by 75 runs (DLS)
Haslegrave Ground, Loughborough
Umpires: Jasmine Naeem and Naeem Ashraf

- Lightning won the toss and elected to field.
- Lightning innings curtailed at 34.2 overs due to rain; target was 242.
- Points: Western Storm 5, Lightning 0
- Naeem Ashraf and Jasmine Naeem became the first married couple to officiate a professional fixture in England together.

2 July 2022
10:30 BST
Scorecard

South East Stars; 281/8 (50 overs)	v	Sunrisers; 201 (41.4 overs)
Bryony Smith 66 (68); Grace Scrivens 4/42 (10 overs)		Grace Scrivens 74 (74); Bryony Smith 3/37 (10 overs)

South East Stars won by 80 runs
County Ground, Beckenham
Umpires: Grace Bambury and Mark Newell

- South East Stars won the toss and elected to bat.
- Points: South East Stars 5, Sunrisers 0

3 July 2022
10:30 BST
Scorecard

North West Thunder; 235/7 (50 overs)	v	Northern Diamonds; 241/4 (42.2 overs)
Emma Lamb 82 (80); Linsey Smith 2/34 (10 overs)		Lauren Winfield-Hill 93 (72); Laura Jackson 2/67 (10 overs)

Northern Diamonds won by 6 wickets
Rookwood Cricket Ground, Sale
Umpires: Anna Harris and Hassan Adnan

- North West Thunder won the toss and elected to bat.
- Points: Northern Diamonds 4, North West Thunder 0

9 July 2022
10:30 BST
Scorecard

North West Thunder; 238/9 (50 overs)	v	Lightning; 241/5 (49.1 overs)
Eleanor Threlkeld 91 (117); Grace Ballinger 5/29 (10 overs)		Kathryn Bryce 109* (133); Laura Jackson 1/34 (8 overs)

Lightning won by 5 wickets
Haslegrave Ground, Loughborough
Umpires: Joanne Ibbotson and Surendiran Shanmugam

- North West Thunder won the toss and elected to bat.
- Points: Lightning 4, North West Thunder 0

9 July 2022
10:30 BST
Scorecard

Northern Diamonds; 194 (49.5 overs)	v	Sunrisers; 188 (45.2 overs)
Hollie Armitage 47 (60); Grace Scrivens 4/20 (10 overs)		Naomi Dattani 41 (58); Linsey Smith 3/34 (10 overs)

Northern Diamonds won by 6 runs
Headingley Cricket Ground, Leeds
Umpires: Hassan Adnan and Jasmine Naeem

- Northern Diamonds won the toss and elected to bat.
- Points: Northern Diamonds 4, Sunrisers 0

9 July 2022
10:30 BST
Scorecard

Southern Vipers; 306/9 (50 overs)	v	South East Stars; 173 (38.4 overs)
Georgia Elwiss 115 (115); Freya Davies 3/37 (9 overs)		Alice Davidson-Richards 42 (47); Paige Scholfield 3/29 (5.4 overs)

Southern Vipers won by 133 runs
County Ground, Hove
Umpires: Anthony Harris and Sarah Bartlett

- South East Stars won the toss and elected to field.
- Points: Southern Vipers 5, South East Stars 0

9 July 2022
10:30 BST
Scorecard

Central Sparks; 206 (50 overs)	v	Western Storm; 184/9 (50 overs)
Ami Campbell 50 (75); Lauren Filer 3/36 (10 overs)		Lauren Filer 58* (69); Sarah Glenn 4/23 (10 overs)

Central Sparks won by 22 runs
County Ground, Bristol
Umpires: Jack Shantry and Sophie McLelland

- Central Sparks won the toss and elected to bat.
- Points: Central Sparks 4, Western Storm 0

16 July 2022
10:30 BST
Scorecard

Central Sparks; 214/6 (50 overs)	v	Northern Diamonds; 215/5 (39.2 overs)
Evelyn Jones 91 (128); Emma Marlow 2/37 (10 overs)		Hollie Armitage 60* (63); Grace Potts 2/43 (7.2 overs)

Northern Diamonds won by 5 wickets
New Road, Worcester
Umpires: Anthony Harris and Sarah Bartlett

- Central Sparks won the toss and elected to bat.
- Points: Northern Diamonds 5, Central Sparks 0

16 July 2022
10:30 BST
Scorecard

Southern Vipers; 294/6 (50 overs)	v	Lightning; 228 (44 overs)
Georgia Adams 82 (93); Josie Groves 2/34 (6 overs)		Josie Groves 55 (39); Charlotte Taylor 3/31 (10 overs)

Southern Vipers won by 66 runs
County Ground, Derby
Umpires: Jasmine Naeem and Surendiran Shanmugam

- Southern Vipers won the toss and elected to bat.
- Points: Southern Vipers 5, Lightning 0

16 July 2022
10:30 BST
Scorecard

Sunrisers; 254/6 (50 overs)	v	Western Storm; 257/7 (49 overs)
Cordelia Griffith 74 (106); Niamh Holland 2/32 (7 overs)		Sophie Luff 100* (142); Mady Villiers 2/33 (10 overs)

Western Storm won by 3 wickets
County Ground, Chelmsford
Umpires: Bob White and Sophie McLelland

- Sunrisers won the toss and elected to bat.
- Points: Western Storm 4, Sunrisers 0

16 July 2022
10:30 BST
Scorecard

South East Stars; 198 (47.5 overs)	v	North West Thunder; 146 (40.1 overs)
Lauren Smith 73* (93); Alex Hartley 6/24 (10 overs)		Georgie Boyce 68 (105); Bethan Miles 3/15 (6 overs)

South East Stars won by 52 runs
Trafalgar Road Ground, Southport
Umpires: Grace Bambury and Naeem Ashraf

- South East Stars won the toss and elected to bat.
- Points: South East Stars 5, North West Thunder 0

23 July 2022
10:30 BST
Scorecard

Lightning; 199 (49.1 overs)	v	Northern Diamonds; 200/9 (49.4 overs)
Tammy Beaumont 70 (105); Leigh Kasperek 3/39 (10 overs)		Lauren Winfield-Hill 61 (75); Lucy Higham 3/50 (10 overs)

Northern Diamonds won by 1 wicket
Riverside Ground, Chester-le-Street
Umpires: Naeem Ashraf and Surenidran Shanmugam

- Lightning won the toss and elected to bat.
- Points: Northern Diamonds 4, Lightning 0

23 July 2022
10:30 BST
Scorecard

Southern Vipers; 233/9 (50 overs)	v	Sunrisers; 222/8 (50 overs)
Paige Scholfield 74 (72); Kate Coppack 4/48 (9 overs)		Cordelia Griffith 65 (109); Charlie Dean 3/31 (10 overs)

Southern Vipers won by 11 runs
Rose Bowl, Southampton
Umpires: Billy Taylor and Grace Bambury

- Southern Vipers won the toss and elected to bat.
- Points: Southern Vipers 4, Sunrisers 0

23 July 2022
10:30 BST
Scorecard

South East Stars; 283/8 (50 overs)	v	Western Storm; 247 (48 overs)
Chloe Brewer 61 (53); Chloe Skelton 5/54 (9 overs)		Sophie Luff 95 (119); Alice Davidson-Richards 4/33 (8 overs)

South East Stars won by 36 runs
College Ground, Cheltenham
Umpires: Anthony Harris and Jasmine Naeem

- South East Stars won the toss and elected to bat.
- Points: South East Stars 4, Western Storm 0

23 July 2022
14:00 BST (D/N)
Scorecard

North West Thunder; 236/9 (48 overs)	v	Central Sparks; 191 (41.4 overs)
Emma Lamb 68 (69); Emily Arlott 4/36 (10 overs)		Abigail Freeborn 72 (72); Emma Lamb 3/26 (7 overs)

North West Thunder won by 28 runs (DLS)
Old Trafford Cricket Ground, Manchester
Umpires: Jack Shantry and Sophie McLelland

- Central Sparks won the toss and elected to field.
- Match reduced to 48 overs per side due to rain.
- Central Sparks innings reduced to 43 overs due to rain; target was 220.
- Points: North West Thunder 4, Central Sparks 0

9 September 2022
10:30 BST

Central Sparks	v	Lightning

No Result
New Road, Worcester

- The match was postponed due to the death of Queen Elizabeth II, and later deemed a no result with points shared.
- Points: Central Sparks 2, Lightning 2

9 September 2022
10:30 BST

South East Stars	v	Northern Diamonds

No Result
County Ground, Beckenham

- The match was postponed due to the death of Queen Elizabeth II, and later deemed a no result with points shared.
- Points: South East Stars 2, Northern Diamonds 2

9 September 2022
10:30 BST

Southern Vipers	v	Western Storm

No Result
County Ground, Hove

- The match was postponed due to the death of Queen Elizabeth II, and later deemed a no result with points shared.
- Points: Southern Vipers 2, Western Storm 2

9 September 2022
10:30 BST

Sunrisers	v	North West Thunder

No Result
County Ground, Northampton

- The match was postponed due to the death of Queen Elizabeth II, and later deemed a no result with points shared.
- Points: Sunrisers 2, North West Thunder 2

11 September 2022
10:30 BST
Scorecard

South East Stars; 254/9 (50 overs)	v	Central Sparks; 195/9 (50 overs)
Chloe Brewer 57 (76); Elizabeth Russell 3/44 (10 overs)		Georgia Davis 52* (103); Eva Gray 3/28 (8 overs)

South East Stars won by 59 runs
County Ground, Beckenham
Umpires: Joanne Ibbotson and Russell Warren

- Central Sparks won the toss and elected to field.
- Points: South East Stars 5, Central Sparks 0

11 September 2022
10:30 BST
Scorecard

North West Thunder; 203 (48.3 overs)	v	Southern Vipers; 204/6 (47 overs)
Eleanor Threlkeld 79 (117); Tara Norris 3/42 (10 overs)		Emily Windsor 59 (75); Phoebe Graham 2/32 (10 overs)

Southern Vipers won by 4 wickets
Rose Bowl, Southampton
Umpires: Alex Wharf and Fiona Richards

- North West Thunder won the toss and elected to bat.
- Points: Southern Vipers 4, North West Thunder 0

11 September 2022
10:30 BST
Scorecard

Lightning; 230/9 (50 overs)	v	Sunrisers; 160 (41 overs)
Kathryn Bryce 104 (109); Jo Gardner 3/45 (10 overs)		Grace Scrivens 54 (65); Kirstie Gordon 4/31 (10 overs)

Lightning won by 70 runs
County Ground, Chelmsford
Umpires: Neil Bainton and Rose Dovey

- Sunrisers won the toss and elected to field.
- Points: Lightning 5, Sunrisers 0

11 September 2022
10:30 BST
Scorecard

Northern Diamonds; 334/6 (50 overs)	v	Western Storm; 230 (45.4 overs)
Hollie Armitage 131* (131); Chloe Skelton 2/39 (10 overs)		Danielle Gibson 76 (59); Katie Levick 4/41 (8.4 overs)

Northern Diamonds won by 104 runs
County Ground, Taunton
Umpires: Ben Peverall and Paul Baldwin

- Northern Diamonds won the toss and elected to bat.
- Points: Northern Diamonds 5, Western Storm 0

17 September 2022
10:30 BST
Scorecard

Central Sparks; 260/9 (50 overs)	v	Sunrisers; 121 (28.5 overs)
Emily Arlott 63 (73); Mady Villiers 3/44 (10 overs)		Grace Scrivens 61 (75); Davina Perrin 3/26 (5 overs)

Central Sparks won by 139 runs
New Road, Worcester
Umpires: Jack Shantry and Joanne Ibbotson

- Sunrisers won the toss and elected to field.
- Points: Central Sparks 5, Sunrisers 0

17 September 2022
10:30 BST
Scorecard

South East Stars; 281/9 (50 overs)	v	Lightning; 169 (38.4 overs)
Bryony Smith 114 (102); Grace Ballinger 3/62 (10 overs)		Georgie Boyce 70 (83); Eva Gray 3/29 (6 overs)

South East Stars won by 112 runs
Grace Road, Leicester
Umpires: Hassan Adnan and Rose Dovey

- South East Stars won the toss and elected to bat.
- Points: South East Stars 5, Lightning 0

17 September 2022
10:30 BST
Scorecard

Southern Vipers; 226/9 (50 overs)	v	Northern Diamonds; 231/6 (43 overs)
Georgia Elwiss 61 (95); Hollie Armitage 3/37 (7 overs)		Lauren Winfield-Hill 125 (125); Georgia Adams 2/37 (10 overs)

Northern Diamonds won by 4 wickets
Headingley Cricket Ground, Leeds
Umpires: Anthony Harris and Sarah Bartlett

- Southern Vipers won the toss and elected to bat.
- Points: Northern Diamonds 4, Southern Vipers 0

18 September 2022
10:30 BST
Scorecard

North West Thunder; 242/5 (50 overs)	v	Western Storm; 239/8 (44.3 overs)
Seren Smale 57 (93); Lauren Filer 3/46 (10 overs)		Danielle Gibson 56 (40); Laura Jackson 3/50 (10 overs)

Western Storm won by 2 wickets (DLS)
Old Trafford Cricket Ground, Manchester
Umpires: Naeem Ashraf and Grace Bambury

- Western Storm won the toss and elected to field.
- Western Storm innings reduced to 48 overs due to rain; target was 239.
- Points: Western Storm 4, North West Thunder 0

=== Play-off ===
21 September 2022
10:30 BST
Scorecard

South East Stars; 139 (42.2 overs)	v	Southern Vipers; 143/4 (34 overs)
Jemima Spence 45* (102); Tara Norris 3/29 (10 overs)		Maia Bouchier 51 (68); Phoebe Franklin 1/14 (5 overs)

Southern Vipers won by 6 wickets
County Ground, Beckenham
Umpires: Jack Shantry and Jasmine Naeem

- South East Stars won the toss and elected to bat.

=== Final ===
25 September 2022
10:30 BST
Scorecard

Northern Diamonds; 215/9 (50 overs)	v	Southern Vipers; 213/9 (50 overs)
Lauren Winfield-Hill 65 (87); Georgia Adams 3/34 (7 overs)		Georgia Adams 70 (96); Linsey Smith 2/24 (10 overs)

Northern Diamonds won by 2 runs
Lord's, London
Umpires: Rob White and Grace Banbury
Player of the match: Lauren Winfield-Hill (Northern Diamonds)

- Southern Vipers won the toss and elected to field.

== Statistics ==
- Highest score by a team: Northern Diamonds – 334/6 (50 overs) v Western Storm (11 September).
- Top score by an individual: Hollie Armitage – 131* (131) v Western Storm (11 September).
- Best bowling figures by an individual: Alex Hartley – 6/24 (10 overs) v South East Stars (16 July).

=== Most runs ===
Player	Team	Matches	Innings	Runs	Average	HS	100s	50s
Lauren Winfield-Hill	Northern Diamonds	7	7	470	78.33	125*	1	5
Hollie Armitage	Northern Diamonds	7	7	343	68.60	131*	1	1
Grace Scrivens	Sunrisers	6	6	297	49.50	74	0	4
Emily Windsor	Lightning/Southern Vipers	8	8	288	57.60	90	0	2
Sophie Luff	Western Storm	6	6	268	53.60	100*	1	1

Source: ESPNCricinfo

=== Most wickets ===
Player	Team	Overs	Wickets	Average	BBI	5w
Grace Scrivens	Sunrisers	59.0	13	14.69	4/20	0
Linsey Smith	Northern Diamonds	69.0	13	18.07	3/34	0
Tara Norris	Southern Vipers	58.0	12	19.75	3/29	0
Mady Villiers	Sunrisers	59.5	12	21.83	4/36	0
Katie Levick	Northern Diamonds	65.5	12	23.08	4/41	0

Source: ESPNCricinfo
