= Chloe Brewer =

English cricketer (born 2002)

Personal information
- Full name: Chloe Edna Christine Brewer
- Born: 12 July 2002 (age 24)
- Batting: Right-handed
- Bowling: Right-arm medium
- Role: Batter

Domestic team information
- Years: Team
- 2019–2022: Surrey
- 2020–2022: South East Stars
- 2023–2024: Central Sparks
- 2023: Birmingham Phoenix
- 2025: Warwickshire

Career statistics
Competition	WLA	WT20
Matches	30	18
Runs scored	597	123
Batting average	22.96	9.46
100s/50s	0/4	0/0
Top score	79	41
Balls bowled	123	28
Wickets	7	1
Bowling average	16.14	47.00
5 wickets in innings	0	0
10 wickets in match	0	0
Best bowling	3/18	1/21
Catches/stumpings	11/–	4/–
- Source: CricketArchive, 6 August 2025

Chloe Edna Christine Brewer (born 12 July 2002) is an English cricketer who currently plays for Warwickshire. She plays primarily as a right-handed batter. She has previously played for Surrey, South East Stars, Central Sparks and Birmingham Phoenix.

== Domestic career ==
Brewer made her county debut in 2019, for Surrey against Yorkshire. Overall, she played five matches for Surrey in 2019, but had little opportunity to contribute. She played eight matches for the side in the 2021 Women's Twenty20 Cup, but scored just 26 runs. However, she was the leading run-scorer in the 2021 Women's London Championship, with 139 runs including two half-centuries. She played one match in the 2022 Women's Twenty20 Cup, scoring 32 runs and taking one wicket.

In 2020, Brewer played for South East Stars in the Rachael Heyhoe Flint Trophy. She appeared in the final two matches of the Stars' season, and made an immediate impression, scoring 40 on debut against Sunrisers and then making her List A high score of 79 against Southern Vipers. She played two matches in the 2021 Rachael Heyhoe Flint Trophy, scoring 42 runs. She also played one match in South East Stars' victorious 2021 Charlotte Edwards Cup campaign, scoring 41 from 33 balls against Central Sparks. In 2022, she played five matches for South East Stars in the 2022 Rachael Heyhoe Flint Trophy, scoring 172 runs at an average of 34.40. She scored two half-centuries, against Western Storm and Central Sparks. She also signed for London Spirit in The Hundred as an injury replacement for Heather Knight, but did not play a match.

In November 2022, it was announced that Brewer had signed for Central Sparks for the following season, and had signed her first professional contract. In 2023, she played six matches for Central Sparks, across the Rachael Heyhoe Flint Trophy and the Charlotte Edwards Cup, as well as playing one match for Birmingham Phoenix in The Hundred. In 2024, she played 14 matches for Central Sparks, across the Rachael Heyhoe Flint Trophy and the Charlotte Edwards Cup, with a high score of 54.
