= Emma Marlow =

English cricketer

Personal information
- Full name: Emma Kate Marlow
- Born: 12 April 2004 (age 22); Harrogate, North Yorkshire, England
- Batting: Right-handed
- Bowling: Right-arm off break
- Role: Bowler

Domestic team information
- Years: Team
- 2020–2024: Yorkshire
- 2022–2024: Northern Diamonds
- 2022: Trent Rockets

Career statistics
Competition	WLA	WT20
Matches	30	21
Runs scored	583	188
Batting average	25.34	14.46
100s/50s	0/3	0/1
Top score	63	51
Balls bowled	478	228
Wickets	10	9
Bowling average	39.50	20.88
5 wickets in innings	0	0
10 wickets in match	0	0
Best bowling	3/40	2/12
Catches/stumpings	8/–	6/–
- Source: CricketArchive, 17 October 2024

Emma Kate Marlow (born 12 April 2004) is an English cricketer who currently plays for Durham. She plays as a right-arm off break bowler.

== Early life ==
Marlow was born on 12 April 2004 in Harrogate.

== Domestic career ==
Marlow first played for Yorkshire in 2020, in friendlies arranged when the county season was cancelled due to the COVID-19 pandemic. She made her full county debut for Yorkshire in the 2021 Women's Twenty20 Cup, against Cumbria. She played three matches for the side in the 2022 Women's Twenty20 Cup, taking two wickets at an average of 27.50.

Marlow was named in the Northern Diamonds Academy squad for the 2021 season. She was promoted to the first team squad ahead of the 2022 season. She made her debut for the side on 14 May 2022, against Lightning in the Charlotte Edwards Cup, where she took 2/12 from her 4 overs. She went on to play 11 matches for Northern Diamonds in 2022, across the Charlotte Edwards Cup and the Rachael Heyhoe Flint Trophy, taking seven wickets apiece in each competition. She was also part of the Trent Rockets squad in The Hundred, but did not play a match. At the end of the 2022 season, it was announced that Marlow had signed her first professional contract with Northern Diamonds.

In 2023, she played ten matches for Northern Diamonds, all in the Rachael Heyhoe Flint Trophy, scoring 164 runs and taking one wicket. In 2024, she played 23 matches for Northern Diamonds, across the Rachael Heyhoe Flint Trophy and the Charlotte Edwards Cup, scoring three half-centuries.

== International career ==
In October 2022, Marlow was selected in the England Under-19 squad for the 2023 ICC Under-19 Women's T20 World Cup. She went on to play two matches in the tournament.
