= Ria Fackrell =

English cricketer (born 1999)

Personal information
- Full name: Ria Ashleigh Fackrell
- Born: 16 September 1999 (age 27); Coventry, England
- Batting: Right-handed
- Bowling: Right-arm off break
- Role: All-rounder

Domestic team information
- Years: Team
- 2017–present: Warwickshire
- 2017: → Shropshire (on loan)
- 2019: Lancashire Thunder
- 2020: Lightning
- 2021–2024: Central Sparks
- 2021–2022: Birmingham Phoenix

Career statistics
Competition	WLA	WT20
Matches	34	47
Runs scored	357	435
Batting average	14.87	14.50
100s/50s	0/1	0/0
Top score	65*	45
Balls bowled	855	299
Wickets	24	9
Bowling average	30.75	33.44
5 wickets in innings	0	0
10 wickets in match	0	0
Best bowling	4/34	2/27
Catches/stumpings	7/–	9/–
- Source: CricketArchive, 16 October 2024

Ria Ashleigh Fackrell (born 16 September 1999) is an English cricketer who currently plays for Warwickshire. She plays as a right-handed batter and right-arm off break bowler. She has previously played for Shropshire, Lancashire Thunder, Lightning, Central Sparks and Birmingham Phoenix.

== Early life ==
Fackrell was born on 16 September 1999 in Coventry.

== Domestic career ==
Fackrell joined the Warwickshire academy set-up when she was 10 years old, but made her county debut for Shropshire, in 2017 against Hertfordshire, in which she scored 14 and took 1/14 from 6 overs. Fackrell played the first half of the 2017 season for Shropshire, before returning to Warwickshire. The following season, she hit 163 runs at an average of 20.37 in the 2018 Women's Twenty20 Cup. In 2019, Fackrell hit her maiden county half-century, scoring 65* in a County Championship match against Lancashire, as well as helping her side to the title in the Twenty20 Cup. She played eight matches for Warwickshire in the 2022 Women's Twenty20 Cup, scoring 63 runs.

Fackrell also played for Lancashire Thunder in the Women's Cricket Super League in 2019. She played three matches, scoring 10 runs and taking 1 catch.

In 2020, Fackrell played for Lightning in the Rachael Heyhoe Flint Trophy. She appeared in one match, against Northern Diamonds, and scored 8 runs.

In 2021, it was announced that Fackrell had moved from Lightning to Central Sparks for the upcoming season. She was used primarily as a bowler by her new side, and achieved her best bowling figures in both List A and Twenty20 cricket that season, taking 4/34 in a Rachael Heyhoe Flint Trophy match against Western Storm and 2/27 in a Charlotte Edwards Cup match against Lightning. Overall in the Rachael Heyhoe Flint Trophy, Fackrell took 11 wickets at an average of 24.09, whilst also top-scoring with 42* in the play-off against Northern Diamonds. She was also in the Birmingham Phoenix squad for The Hundred, but did not play a match. She played four matches for Central Sparks in 2022, all in the Rachael Heyhoe Flint Trophy. She also played one match for Birmingham Phoenix in The Hundred, taking 1/19.

In 2023, she played two matches for Central Sparks, both in the Rachael Heyhoe Flint Trophy, scoring 22 runs and taking one wicket. In 2024, she played 10 matches for Central Sparks, across the Rachael Heyhoe Flint Trophy and the Charlotte Edwards Cup, taking 12 wickets.
