= Davina Perrin =

English cricketer

Personal information
- Full name: Davina Sarah Tamanda Perrin
- Born: 8 September 2006 (age 20); Wolverhampton, England
- Batting: Right-handed
- Bowling: Right-arm medium
- Role: Batter

Domestic team information
- Years: Team
- 2021–2023: Staffordshire
- 2021–2024: Central Sparks
- 2022–2023: Birmingham Phoenix
- 2024–2025: Northern Superchargers
- 2025–present: Warwickshire
- 2026–present: Birmingham Phoenix

Career statistics
Competition	WLA	WT20
Matches	51	76
Runs scored	1,205	1,486
Batting average	26.77	22.17
100s/50s	1/6	1/8
Top score	113	101
Balls bowled	60	132
Wickets	3	6
Bowling average	21.66	20.33
5 wickets in innings	0	0
10 wickets in match	0	0
Best bowling	3/26	2/21
Catches/stumpings	12/–	29/–
- Source: CricketArchive, Cricinfo, 27 July 2026

Davina Sarah Tamanda Perrin (born 8 September 2006) is an English cricketer who currently plays for Warwickshire and Birmingham Phoenix. She plays as a right-handed batter.

== Early life and education ==
Perrin was born in Wolverhampton, West Midlands. Her father, David, played junior cricket for Staffordshire; her own cricket club is Fordhouses in Wolverhampton. In 2024, she graduated with a sport BTEC for which she had studied at Edgbaston. Perrin has five siblings.

== Domestic career ==
Perrin made her county debut in 2021, for Staffordshire against Worcestershire. In the 2022 Women's Twenty20 Cup, she was the fourth-highest run-scorer across the entire competition, with 242 runs at an average of 34.57. She made 87 from 75 deliveries in Staffordshire's victory over Berkshire.

Perrin was selected for the Central Sparks Academy in 2021, and scored a century during an intra-squad multi-day game in September. Later that month, Perrin was added to the full Central Sparks squad, and made her debut for the side on 10 September, in a Rachael Heyhoe Flint Trophy match against Sunrisers. She played four matches overall for the side that season, scoring 92 runs including a best of 43 made against South East Stars.

In 2022, Perrin scored 137 runs at an average of 27.40 in the Rachael Heyhoe Flint Trophy, as well as playing six matches in the Charlotte Edwards Cup. In a Rachael Heyhoe Flint Trophy match against Sunrisers, Perrin scored 45 opening the batting and took 3/26 from her 5 overs. She also signed for Birmingham Phoenix in the 2022 season of The Hundred, becoming the youngest player in the competition at 15 years old. However, she did not play a match for the side.

At the end of the 2022 season, it was announced that Perrin had signed her first professional contract with Central Sparks. By entering into that contract, she became only the third Black female professional cricketer in the UK; "When I step on to that pitch, I'm representing girls of ethnic minorities who are underrepresented across the game, particularly the professional game," she later told The Guardian. She has also been involved with Ebony Rainford-Brent's ACE (African Caribbean Engagement) programme.

In 2023, Perrin played 15 matches for Central Sparks, across the Rachael Heyhoe Flint Trophy and the Charlotte Edwards Cup. She was again in the Birmingham Phoenix squad for The Hundred, but did not play a match. In 2024, she played 23 matches for Central Sparks, across the Rachael Heyhoe Flint Trophy and the Charlotte Edwards Cup, scoring three half-centuries.

In the 2025 season of the Hundred, Perrin scored an unbeaten 72 against Trent Rockets in the group stage, and later made the first century – 101 off 43 balls – of the season in the Eliminator against London Spirit. Perrin reached her century in 42 balls, a record for the women's competition.

She was named 2025 Professional Cricketers' Association Women's Young Player of the Year.

== International career ==
In October 2022, Perrin was selected in the England Under-19 squad for the 2023 ICC Under-19 Women's T20 World Cup. She played four matches in the tournament, scoring 36 runs and taking two wickets. As of 2024, she had ambitions to play for the England senior team.
