= Elizabeth Russell (cricketer) =

English cricketer

Personal information
- Full name: Elizabeth Ann Russell
- Born: 22 May 1994 (age 32); Solihull, West Midlands, England
- Batting: Left-handed
- Bowling: Right-arm medium
- Role: Bowler

Domestic team information
- Years: Team
- 2008–2023: Warwickshire
- 2020–2023: Central Sparks
- 2021–2022: Northern Superchargers

Career statistics
Competition	WLA	WT20
Matches	87	70
Runs scored	393	155
Batting average	8.73	7.75
100s/50s	0/1	0/0
Top score	51	30
Balls bowled	3,415	1,036
Wickets	99	42
Bowling average	22.64	23.82
5 wickets in innings	1	1
10 wickets in match	0	0
Best bowling	5/13	5/19
Catches/stumpings	17/–	12/–
- Source: CricketArchive, 4 October 2023

Elizabeth Ann Russell (born 22 May 1994) is an English former cricketer who played as a right-arm medium bowler. She played for Warwickshire, Central Sparks and Northern Superchargers.

== Early life ==
Russell was born on 22 May 1994 in Solihull, West Midlands.

== Domestic career ==
Russell made her county debut in 2008, for Warwickshire against Lancashire. In her first season she was her side's joint-leading wicket-taker, with 8 wickets including 4/32 taken against Surrey. In 2010, she took 15 wickets at an average of 20.53 in the County Championship, the most for her side. In both the 2012 and 2013 County Championships, Russell took 12 wickets, and in 2013 she took her maiden county five-wicket haul, with 5/13 against Essex. Two years later, against the same opponents, she took her first Twenty20 five-wicket haul, 5/19. In 2016 she hit her maiden county half-century, scoring 51 against Somerset.

Russell had a strong season in 2017, as she took 10 wickets at an average of 7.50 in the County Championship and 9 wickets at an average of 10.66 in the Twenty20 Cup. In 2019, she again took 10 wickets in the County Championship, as well as helping her side to the Division 1 title in the Twenty20 Cup. Russell took five wickets at an average of 31.50 in the 2022 Women's Twenty20 Cup. She played one match in the 2023 Women's Twenty20 Cup.

In 2020, Russell played for Central Sparks in the Rachael Heyhoe Flint Trophy. She appeared in 5 matches, taking 6 wickets at an average of 29.00. Her best performance came in the Sparks' victory over Northern Diamonds, where she took 4/28. She took 4 wickets for her side in the 2021 Rachael Heyhoe Flint Trophy, as well as appearing once in the 2021 Charlotte Edwards Cup. She also signed for Northern Superchargers in The Hundred as a temporary replacement for Helen Fenby due to illness. She played 7 matches for the side, taking two wickets. She played seven matches for Central Sparks in 2022, across the Charlotte Edwards Cup and the Rachael Heyhoe Flint Trophy, taking eight wickets. She also played one match for Northern Superchargers in The Hundred. She was named in the Central Sparks squad for the 2023 season, but did not play a match.

At the end of the 2023 season, Russell announced her retirement from cricket.
