= 2024 Rachael Heyhoe Flint Trophy =

English cricket season

- Dates: 20 April 2024 – 21 September 2024
- Administrator: England and Wales Cricket Board
- Cricket format: 50-over cricket
- Tournament format(s): Double round-robin and knock-out finals
- Champions: Sunrisers (1st title)
- Participants: 8
- Matches: 59
- Most runs: Alice Davidson-Richards (650)
- Most wickets: Phoebe Turner (23)
- Official website: Rachael Heyhoe Flint Trophy

The 2024 Rachael Heyhoe Flint Trophy was the fifth, and final, edition of the Rachael Heyhoe Flint Trophy, an English women's cricket 50-over domestic competition, which took place between 20 April and 21 September 2024. It featured eight teams playing in a double round-robin group stage, followed by a knock-out round. It ran alongside the Charlotte Edwards Cup. Southern Vipers were the defending champions.

Sunrisers won their maiden Rachael Heyhoe Flint Trophy title, beating South East Stars in the rain affected final by 27 runs (DLS method).

== Format ==
Teams played each other twice in a group of eight, with the top four qualifying for the knock-out stage. This represented the addition of a semi-finals stage compared to the previous edition, which had one play-off between second and third place. The final was held at Grace Road, Leicester.

== Teams ==
The teams that competed in the tournament are listed below.

- Central Sparks (representing Warwickshire, Worcestershire, Herefordshire, Shropshire and Staffordshire)
- Northern Diamonds (representing Yorkshire, Durham and Northumberland)
- North West Thunder (representing Lancashire, Cheshire and Cumbria)
- South East Stars (representing Surrey and Kent)
- Southern Vipers (representing Hampshire, Sussex, Berkshire, Buckinghamshire, Dorset, Isle of Wight and Oxfordshire)
- Sunrisers (representing Middlesex, Essex, Northamptonshire, Bedfordshire, Cambridgeshire, Hertfordshire, Huntingdonshire, Norfolk and Suffolk)
- The Blaze (representing Derbyshire, Leicestershire, Nottinghamshire and Lincolnshire)
- Western Storm (representing Glamorgan, Gloucestershire, Somerset, Cornwall, Devon, Wiltshire and Cricket Wales)

== Standings ==
Teams received 4 points for a win. A bonus point was given where the winning team's run rate was 1.25 or greater times that of the opposition. In case of a tie in the standings, the following tiebreakers were applied in order: highest net run rate, team that scored the most points in matches involving the tied parties, better bowling strike rate, drawing of lots.

Pos	Team	Pld	W	L	T	NR	BP	Pts	NRR
1	Northern Diamonds (Q)	14	9	4	0	1	3	41	0.097
2	South East Stars (Q)	14	9	5	0	0	4	40	0.246
3	Southern Vipers (Q)	14	7	6	0	1	4	34	0.534
4	Sunrisers (Q)	14	7	6	0	1	4	34	−0.122
5	The Blaze	14	7	6	0	1	1	31	−0.176
6	North West Thunder	14	5	8	0	1	3	25	−0.013
7	Central Sparks	14	5	8	0	1	3	25	−0.299
8	Western Storm	14	4	10	0	0	2	18	−0.211

Source: England and Wales Cricket Board

advanced to the Semi-finals

== Fixtures ==
=== Group stage ===
20 April 2024
10:30
Scorecard

Central Sparks; 213/9 (50 overs)	v	The Blaze; 135 (41 overs)
Abigail Freeborn 53 (87); Grace Ballinger 3/47 (10 overs)		Nadine de Klerk 43 (65); Hannah Baker 3/29 (8 overs)

Central Sparks won by 78 runs
Edgbaston Cricket Ground, Birmingham
Umpires: Grace Bambury and Rob White

- Central Sparks won the toss and elected to bat.
- Points: Central Sparks 5, The Blaze 0

20 April 2024
10:30
Scorecard

North West Thunder; 165 (43.1 overs)	v	Northern Diamonds; 166/1 (34.3 overs)
Seren Smale 32 (49); Katie Levick 4/38 (9.1 overs)		Lauren Winfield-Hill 69* (92); Hannah Jones 1/34 (7.3 overs)

Northern Diamonds won by 9 wickets
Riverside Ground, Chester-le-Street
Umpires: Jasmine Naeem and Simon Widdup

- Northern Diamonds won the toss and elected to field.
- Points: Northern Diamonds 5, North West Thunder 0

20 April 2024
10:30
Scorecard

Southern Vipers; 273/9 (50 overs)	v	South East Stars; 274/6 (49.3 overs)
Freya Kemp 50 (47); Ryana MacDonald-Gay 3/46 (9 overs)		Tash Farrant 94 (97); Charli Knott 2/35 (10 overs)

South East Stars won by 4 wickets
County Ground, Beckenham
Umpires: James Tredwell and Sophie McLelland

- South East Stars won the toss and elected to field.
- Points: South East Stars 4, Southern Vipers 0

20 April 2024
10:30
Scorecard

Western Storm; 114 (30.4 overs)	v	Sunrisers; 116/2 (33.4 overs)
Nat Wraith 42 (52); Nicola Hancock 3/15 (5.4 overs)		Grace Scrivens 63* (98); Amanda-Jade Wellington 1/24 (9 overs)

Sunrisers won by 8 wickets
Sophia Gardens, Cardiff
Umpires: Anna Harris and Ian Blackwell

- Sunrisers won the toss and elected to field.
- Points: Sunrisers 5, Western Storm 0

24 April 2024
10:30
Scorecard

Northern Diamonds; 275/9 (50 overs)	v	Western Storm; 265 (49.2 overs)
Hollie Armitage 103 (114); Amanda-Jade Wellington 3/30 (10 overs)		Sophia Smale 35 (49); Abigail Glen 3/42 (8.2 overs)

Northern Diamonds won by 10 runs
Headingley Cricket Ground, Leeds
Umpires: Chris Watts and Gabi Brown

- Western Storm won the toss and elected to field.
- Points: Northern Diamonds 4, Western Storm 0

24 April 2024
10:30
Scorecard

Central Sparks; 172/9 (50 overs)	v	Southern Vipers; 173/3 (38.5 overs)
Katie George 52 (99); Linsey Smith 2/20 (10 overs)		Charli Knott 58*; Ria Fackrell 1/15 (4.5 overs)

Southern Vipers won by 7 wickets
Sir Paul Getty's Ground, Wormsley
Umpires: Ian Blackwell and Rose Dovey

- Southern Vipers won the toss and elected to field.
- Points: Southern Vipers 5, Central Sparks 0

24 April 2024
10:30
Scorecard

The Blaze; 126 (42 overs)	v	South East Stars; 127/2 (23.3 overs)
Kirstie Gordon 41* (86); Ryana MacDonald-Gay 5/31 (10 overs)		Tash Farrant 68* (81); Kirstie Gordon 1/29 (7 overs)

South East Stars won by 8 wickets
Grace Road, Leicester
Umpires: Jasmine Naeem and Paul Baldwin

- The Blaze won the toss and elected to bat.
- Points: South East Stars 5, The Blaze 0

24 April 2024
10:30
Scorecard

North West Thunder; 292/5 (50 overs)	v	Sunrisers; 150 (40.1 overs)
Katie Mack 100 (110); Kate Coppack 2/32 (7 overs)		Jodi Grewcock 38 (47); Kate Cross 3/21 (8.1 overs)

North West Thunder won by 142 runs
Old Trafford Cricket Ground, Manchester
Umpires: Amy Clark and Simon Widdup

- Sunrisers won the toss and elected to field.
- Points: North West Thunder 5, Sunrisers 0

27 April 2024
10:30
Scorecard

South East Stars; 268 (49.4 overs)	v	Central Sparks; 119/6 (30 overs)
Paige Scholfield 65 (66); Hannah Baker 5/45 (10 overs)		Issy Wong 34* (43); Ryana MacDonald-Gay 4/18 (8 overs)

South East Stars won by 71 runs (DLS)
County Ground, Beckenham
Umpires: James Tredwell and Sophie McLelland

- South East Stars won the toss and elected to bat.
- Central Sparks innings curtailed at 30 overs due to rain; target was 191.
- Points: South East Stars 5, Central Sparks 0

27 April 2024
10:30
Scorecard

Southern Vipers; 287/9 (50 overs)	v	Northern Diamonds; 162/7 (30 overs)
Ella McCaughan 83 (97); Phoebe Turner 3/48 (10 overs)		Lauren Winfield-Hill 63 (62); Charlie Dean 4/34 (8 overs)

Southern Vipers won by 70 runs (DLS)
Rose Bowl, Southampton
Umpires: Ben Peverall and Rose Dovey

- Northern Diamonds won the toss and elected to field.
- Northern Diamonds innings curtailed at 30 overs due to rain; target was 233.
- Points: Southern Vipers 5, Northern Diamonds 0

27 April 2024
10:30
Scorecard

The Blaze; 87 (31.3 overs)	v	Sunrisers; 91/3 (20.5 overs)
Nadine de Klerk 15 (22); Mady Villiers 3/18 (9 overs)		Grace Scrivens 46* (50); Lucy Higham 1/10 (3 overs)

Sunrisers won by 7 wickets
County Ground, Chelmsford
Umpires: Fiona Richards and Simon Widdup

- Sunrisers won the toss and elected to field.
- Points: Sunrisers 5, The Blaze 0

27 April 2024
10:30
Scorecard

Western Storm; 252/6 (50 overs)	v	North West Thunder; 186 (42.4 overs)
Sophie Luff 76* (100); Sophie Ecclestone 3/16 (10 overs)		Emma Lamb 38 (53); Chloe Skelton 3/35 (8 overs)

Western Storm won by 66 runs
Old Trafford Cricket Ground, Manchester
Umpires: Grace Bambury and Paul Baldwin

- North West Thunder won the toss and elected to field.
- Points: Western Storm 5, North West Thunder 0

1 May 2024
10:30
Scorecard

Central Sparks; 213 (50 overs)	v	Sunrisers; 214/5 (39.4 overs)
Abigail Freeborn 93 (145); Kate Coppack 3/26 (8 overs)		Grace Scrivens 118* (123); Bethan Ellis 2/38 (9 overs)

Sunrisers won by 5 wickets
Chester Road North Ground, Kidderminster
Umpires: Joanne Ibbotson and Naeem Ashraf

- Sunrisers won the toss and elected to field.
- Points: Sunrisers 5, Central Sparks 0

1 May 2024
10:30
Scorecard

Northern Diamonds; 188 (47.4 overs)	v	The Blaze; 189/8 (49.4 overs)
Leah Dobson 54 (85); Sophie Munro 3/28 (8.4 overs)		Bethan Gammon 39 (52); Erin Burns 3/40 (10 overs)

The Blaze won by 2 wickets
North Marine Road Ground, Scarborough
Umpires: Amy Clark and Sue Redfern

- Northern Diamonds won the toss and elected to bat.
- Points: The Blaze 4, Northern Diamonds 0

1 May 2024
10:30
Scorecard

North West Thunder; 206/9 (50 overs)	v	Southern Vipers; 208/7 (43.3 overs)
Seren Smale 99 (145); Linsey Smith 3/19 (10 overs)		Georgia Adams 51 (65); Tara Norris 3/45 (10 overs)

Southern Vipers won by 3 wickets
Sir Paul Getty's Ground, Wormsley
Umpires: Ben Peverall and Julia Jarvis

- Southern Vipers won the toss and elected to field.
- Points: Southern Vipers 4, North West Thunder 0

1 May 2024
10:30
Scorecard

South East Stars; 298/5 (44 overs)	v	Western Storm; 236/5 (36 overs)
Paige Scholfield 74 (68); Niamh Holland 2/59 (7 overs)		Fran Wilson 65 (61); Bethan Miles 2/47 (5 overs)

Western Storm won by 8 runs (DLS)
County Ground, Taunton
Umpires: Anthony Harris and Gabi Brown

- Western Storm won the toss and elected to field.
- Match reduced to 44 overs per side due to rain.
- Western Storm innings curtailed at 36 overs due to rain; target was 229.
- Points: Western Storm 4, South East Stars 0

4 May 2024
10:30
Scorecard

Northern Diamonds; 216 (49.2 overs)	v	Central Sparks; 215 (50 overs)
Erin Burns 49 (63); Ria Fackrell 2/19 (6 overs)		Evelyn Jones 65 (98); Hollie Armitage 3/40 (7 overs)

Northern Diamonds won by 1 run
Edgbaston Cricket Ground, Birmingham
Umpires: Grace Bambury and Anthony Harris

- Northern Diamonds won the toss and elected to bat.
- Points: Northern Diamonds 4, Central Sparks 0

4 May 2024
10:30
Scorecard

Sunrisers; 222/9 (50 overs)	v	South East Stars; 223/5 (47.5 overs)
Florence Miller 30 (33); Kalea Moore 2/42 (9 overs)		Sophia Dunkley 67 (89); Mady Villiers 2/43 (10 overs)

South East Stars won by 5 wickets
County Ground, Northampton
Umpires: Neil Bainton and Joanne Ibbotson

- Sunrisers won the toss and elected to bat.
- Points: South East Stars 4, Sunrisers 0

4 May 2024
10:30
Scorecard

Southern Vipers; 295/5 (50 overs)	v	Western Storm; 291/9 (50 overs)
Charli Knott 102 (112); Sophia Smale 2/49 (9 overs)		Heather Knight 62 (59); Freya Davies 2/51 (10 overs)

Southern Vipers won by 4 runs
County Ground, Bristol
Umpires: Fiona Richards and Sue Redfern

- Western Storm won the toss and elected to field.
- Points: Southern Vipers 4, Western Storm 0

6 May 2024
10:30
Scorecard

The Blaze; 174 (46.4 overs)	v	North West Thunder; 176/9 (44.4 overs)
Kirstie Gordon 43 (82); Mahika Gaur 3/33 (7 overs)		Seren Smale 58 (70); Kirstie Gordon 3/25 (10 overs)

North West Thunder won by 1 wicket
Trent Bridge, Nottingham
Umpires: Chris Watts and Rose Dovey

- North West Thunder won the toss and elected to field.
- Points: North West Thunder 4, The Blaze 0

8 May 2024
10:30
Scorecard

Northern Diamonds; 311/9 (50 overs)	v	South East Stars; 308/9 (50 overs)
Hollie Armitage 66 (70); Phoebe Franklin 3/49 (10 overs)		Sophia Dunkley 130 (136); Erin Burns 2/62 (10 overs)

Northern Diamonds won by 3 runs
County Ground, Beckenham
Umpires: Julia Jarvis and Surendiran Shanmugam

- Northern Diamonds won the toss and elected to bat.
- Points: Northern Diamonds 4, South East Stars 0

8 May 2024
10:30
Scorecard

Southern Vipers; 211/9 (50 overs)	v	Sunrisers; 212/7 (49.3 overs)
Georgia Elwiss 53 (63); Nicola Hancock 3/45 (10 overs)		Jodi Grewcock 56 (56); Charli Knott 3/35 (10 overs)

Sunrisers won by 3 wickets
Brunton Memorial Ground, Radlett
Umpires: Gabi Brown and Jack Shantry

- Sunrisers won the toss and elected to field.
- Points: Sunrisers 4, Southern Vipers 0

8 May 2024
10:30
Scorecard

Western Storm; 275 (48.1 overs)	v	The Blaze; 276/6 (48 overs)
Nat Wraith 73 (54); Kirstie Gordon 4/40 (10 overs)		Nadine de Klerk 106* (113); Sophia Smale 2/47 (9 overs)

The Blaze won by 4 wickets
Trent Bridge, Nottingham
Umpires: Anthony Harris and Jasmine Naeem

- The Blaze won the toss and elected to field.
- Points: The Blaze 4, Western Storm 0

8 May 2024
10:30
Scorecard

North West Thunder; 284/7 (50 overs)	v	Central Sparks; 287/7 (49.4 overs)
Emma Lamb 107 (104); Grace Potts 2/46 (9 overs)		Evelyn Jones 136* (148); Kate Cross 2/50 (9.4 overs)

Central Sparks won by 3 wickets
Old Trafford Cricket Ground, Manchester
Umpires: Amy Clark and Naeem Ashraf

- North West Thunder won the toss and elected to bat.
- Points: Central Sparks 4, North West Thunder 0

30 June 2024
10:30
Scorecard

Central Sparks; 239/8 (50 overs)	v	Northern Diamonds; 242/6 (44 overs)
Katie George 50 (69); Katie Levick 4/46 (10 overs)		Bess Heath 58* (53); Grace Potts 2/34 (5 overs)

Northern Diamonds won by 4 wickets
North Marine Road Ground, Scarborough
Umpires: Gabi Brown and James Middlebrook

- Central Sparks won the toss and elected to bat.
- Points: Northern Diamonds 4, Central Sparks 0

30 June 2024
10:30
Scorecard

The Blaze; 318/8 (44 overs)	v	South East Stars; 185 (32 overs)
Sarah Bryce 81 (71); Tash Farrant 2/67 (7 overs)		Alice Davidson-Richards 44 (33); Heather Graham 6/39 (6 overs)

The Blaze won by 133 runs (DLS)
County Ground, Beckenham
Umpires: Jack Shantry and Sophie McLelland

- South East Stars won the toss and elected to field.
- Match reduced to 44 overs per side due to rain.
- Points: The Blaze 5, South East Stars 0

30 June 2024
10:30
Scorecard

Western Storm; 156 (37 overs)	v	Southern Vipers; 157/3 (29.4 overs)
Fran Wilson 34 (41); Georgia Adams 3/17 (6 overs)		Georgia Elwiss 65* (71); Amanda-Jade Wellington 2/38 (7 overs)

Southern Vipers won by 7 wickets
County Ground, Hove
Umpires: James Tredwell and Rose Dovey

- Southern Vipers won the toss and elected to field.
- Points: Southern Vipers 5, Western Storm 0

30 June 2024
10:30
Scorecard

Sunrisers; 253 (47.3 overs)	v	North West Thunder; 224 (45.2 overs)
Jo Gardner 63 (78); Hannah Jones 4/50 (10 overs)		Emma Lamb 48 (42); Sophie Munro 5/25 (6.2 overs)

Sunrisers won by 30 runs (DLS)
County Ground, Chelmsford
Umpires: Julia Jarvis and Simon Widdup

- Sunrisers won the toss and elected to bat.
- Match reduced to 48 overs per side due to rain.
- North West Thunder target adjusted to 255 runs from 48 overs.
- Points: Sunrisers 4, North West Thunder 0

5 July 2024
10:30
Scorecard

The Blaze; 278 (47.2 overs)	v	Southern Vipers; 281/6 (49.2 overs)
Heather Graham 78 (59); Mary Taylor 3/32 (6.2 overs)		Georgia Elwiss 101* (110); Kathryn Bryce 2/43 (9.2 overs)

Southern Vipers won by 4 wickets
Queen's Park, Chesterfield
Umpires: Amy Clark and Paul Pollard

- The Blaze won the toss and elected to bat.
- Points: Southern Vipers 4, The Blaze 0

7 July 2024
10:30
Scorecard

Central Sparks; 27/0 (6.3 overs)	v	Sunrisers
Evelyn Jones 14* (17)

No result
Brunton Memorial Ground, Radlett
Umpires: Anthony Harris and Fiona Richards

- Sunrisers won the toss and elected to field.
- No further play was possible due to rain.
- Points: Central Sparks 2, Sunrisers 2

7 July 2024
10:30
Scorecard

South East Stars; 283 (49.4 overs)	v	North West Thunder; 201 (42.3 overs)
Bryony Smith 67 (71); Hannah Jones 3/56 (10 overs)		Fi Morris 37 (56); Ryana MacDonald-Gay 4/34 (7.3 overs)

South East Stars won by 82 runs
Stanley Park, Blackpool
Umpires: Hassan Adnan and Joanne Ibbotson

- South East Stars won the toss and elected to bat.
- Points: South East Stars 5, North West Thunder 0

7 July 2024
10:30
Scorecard

Western Storm; 200/5 (30 overs)	v	Northern Diamonds; 199/4 (26.4 overs)
Fran Wilson 61* (63); Abigail Glen 2/24 (6 overs)		Hollie Armitage 101* (76); Ellie Anderson 1/22 (2.4 overs)

Northern Diamonds won by 6 wickets (DLS)
College Ground, Cheltenham
Umpires: Paul Pollard and Sophie McLelland

- Northern Diamonds won the toss and elected to field.
- Western Storm innings reduced to 30 overs due to rain.
- Northern Diamonds innings reduced to 29 overs due to rain; target was 199.
- Points: Northern Diamonds 4, Western Storm 0

10 July 2024
10:30
Scorecard

Central Sparks; 144 (42.4 overs)	v	North West Thunder; 147/2 (29 overs)
Evelyn Jones 38 (62); Tara Norris 4/18 (10 overs)		Emma Lamb 71* (85); Grace Potts 1/23 (6 overs)

North West Thunder won by 8 wickets
New Road, Worcester
Umpires: Grace Bambury and Simon Widdup

- North West Thunder won the toss and elected to field.
- Points: North West Thunder 5, Central Sparks 0

10 July 2024
10:30
Scorecard

Sunrisers; 109 (30.5 overs)	v	Northern Diamonds; 111/6 (24.4 overs)
Jo Gardner 21 (27); Beth Langston 6/24 (10 overs)		Erin Burns 35* (36); Kate Coppack 3/35 (7 overs)

Northern Diamonds won by 4 wickets
Clifton Park, York
Umpires: Jasmine Naeem and Peter Hartley

- Northern Diamonds won the toss and elected to field.
- Points: Northern Diamonds 5, Sunrisers 0

10 July 2024
10:30
Scorecard

South East Stars; 120 (40.3 overs)	v	Southern Vipers; 121/3 (22.5 overs)
Alice Davidson-Richards 35 (58); Freya Davies 4/14 (8.3 overs)		Charli Knott 57* (69); Bryony Smith 2/26 (5.1 overs)

Southern Vipers won by 7 wickets
Falkland Cricket Club, Newbury
Umpires: Gabi Brown and James Tredwell

- Southern Vipers won the toss and elected to field.
- Points: Southern Vipers 5, South East Stars 0

10 July 2024
10:30
Scorecard

Western Storm; 217 (46.5 overs)	v	The Blaze; 220/5 (42.3 overs)
Fran Wilson 67 (68); Kathryn Bryce 4/20 (8.5 overs)		Sarah Bryce 61 (54); Alex Griffiths 2/33 (5 overs)

The Blaze won by 5 wickets
College Ground, Cheltenham
Umpires: Ben Peverall and Julia Jarvis

- The Blaze won the toss and elected to field.
- Points: The Blaze 4, Western Storm 0

12 July 2024
10:30
Scorecard

Western Storm; 284 (49.5 overs)	v	Central Sparks; 102 (25 overs)
Amanda-Jade Wellington 83 (53); Katie George 5/50 (9.5 overs)		Davina Perrin 42 (55); Chloe Skelton 3/8 (5 overs)

Western Storm won by 182 runs
New Road, Worcester
Umpires: Joanne Ibbotson and Simon Widdup

- Central Sparks won the toss and elected to field.
- Points: Western Storm 5, Central Sparks 0

14 July 2024
10:30
Scorecard

South East Stars; 258 (49.5 overs)	v	Sunrisers; 214 (47.5 overs)
Bryony Smith 84 (111); Jodi Grewcock 3/43 (10 overs)		Alice Macleod 44 (54); Danielle Gregory 3/47 (10 overs)

South East Stars won by 44 runs
County Ground, Beckenham
Umpires: Ben Peverall and Rose Dovey

- South East Stars won the toss and elected to bat.
- Points: South East Stars 4, Sunrisers 0

14 July 2024
10:30
Scorecard

Northern Diamonds; 188/8 (26 overs)	v	The Blaze
Bess Heath 61 (45); Grace Ballinger 3/43 (6 overs)

No result
Lindum Sports Club Ground, Lincoln
Umpires: Naeem Ashraf and Sophie McLelland

- The Blaze won the toss and elected to field.
- Match reduced to 30 overs per side due to rain.
- No further play possible due to rain.
- Points: The Blaze 2, Northern Diamonds 2

14 July 2024
10:30
Scorecard

North West Thunder	v	Southern Vipers

Match abandoned
Sedbergh School, Sedbergh

- No toss.
- No play possible due to rain.
- Points: North West Thunder 2, Southern Vipers 2

26 August 2024
10:30
Scorecard

North West Thunder; 250/8 (50 overs)	v	South East Stars; 130 (36.4 overs)
Seren Smale 76 (87); Ryana MacDonald-Gay 3/42 (10 overs)		Kira Chathli 54 (74); Kate Cross 6/40 (8.4 overs)

North West Thunder won by 120 runs
County Ground, Beckenham
Umpires: Julia Jarvis and Neil Bainton

- North West Thunder won the toss and elected to bat.
- Points: North West Thunder 5, South East Stars 0

26 August 2024
10:30
Scorecard

The Blaze; 208 (49.5 overs)	v	Southern Vipers; 188 (44 overs)
Marie Kelly 40 (37); Ava Lee 4/51 (10 overs)		Emily Windsor 41 (64); Orla Prendergast 3/38 (7 overs)

The Blaze won by 20 runs
Arundel Castle Cricket Ground, Arundel
Umpires: Anthony Harris and Rose Dovey

- Southern Vipers won the toss and elected to field.
- Points: The Blaze 4, Southern Vipers 0

26 August 2024
10:30
Scorecard

Northern Diamonds; 188/9 (50 overs)	v	Sunrisers; 189/7 (38 overs)
Sterre Kalis 36 (41); Mady Villiers 4/36 (10 overs)		Grace Scrivens 56 (74); Katherine Fraser 3/37 (8 overs)

Sunrisers won by 3 wickets
County Ground, Chelmsford
Umpires: Chris Watts and Jasmine Naeem

- Northern Diamonds won the toss and elected to bat.
- Points: Sunrisers 5, Northern Diamonds 0

26 August 2024
10:30
Scorecard

Central Sparks; 297/3 (50 overs)	v	Western Storm; 152 (33 overs)
Evelyn Jones 130 (163); Ellie Anderson 2/46 (8 overs)		Sophia Smale 53 (47); Georgia Davis 6/23 (10 overs)

Central Sparks won by 145 runs
County Ground, Taunton
Umpires: Gabi Brown and Sue Redfern

- Western Storm won the toss and elected to field.
- Points: Central Sparks 5, Western Storm 0

30 August 2024
10:30
Scorecard

Southern Vipers; 183 (48.4 overs)	v	Central Sparks; 184/3 (39.2 overs)
Georgia Elwiss 64* (86); Emily Arlott 4/15 (10 overs)		Evelyn Jones 54 (78); Georgia Adams 2/34 (9.2 overs)

Central Sparks won by 7 wickets
New Road, Worcester
Umpires: Ben Peverall and Grace Bambury

- Central Sparks won the toss and elected to field.
- Points: Central Sparks 5, Southern Vipers 0

31 August 2024
10:30
Scorecard

Western Storm; 282/8 (50 overs)	v	South East Stars; 283/5 (47.2 overs)
Fran Wilson 81 (92); Bryony Smith 2/43 (7 overs)		Kira Chathli 86* (81); Alex Griffiths 1/29 (3 overs)

South East Stars won by 5 wickets
County Ground, Beckenham
Umpires: Anthony Harris and Julia Jarvis

- Western Storm won the toss and elected to bat.
- Points: South East Stars 4, Western Storm 0

31 August 2024
10:30
Scorecard

Sunrisers; 245 (49.4 overs)	v	The Blaze; 249/4 (43.3 overs)
Cordelia Griffith 65 (73); Kathryn Bryce 4/41 (8.4 overs)		Kathryn Bryce 87* (95); Eva Gray 2/29 (10 overs)

The Blaze won by 6 wickets
County Ground, Derby
Umpires: Joanne Ibbotson and Surendiran Shanmugam

- Sunrisers won the toss and elected to bat.
- Points: The Blaze 4, Sunrisers 0

1 September 2024
10:30
Scorecard

Northern Diamonds; 290/6 (50 overs)	v	North West Thunder; 204 (38 overs)
Sterre Kalis 100 (95); Hannah Jones 2/37 (10 overs)		Evelyn Jones 57 (76); Phoebe Turner 6/20 (9 overs)

Northern Diamonds won by 86 runs
Trafalgar Road Ground, Southport
Umpires: Jasmine Naeem and Naeem Ashraf

- North West Thunder won the toss and elected to field.
- Points: Northern Diamonds 5, North West Thunder 0

4 September 2024
10:30
Scorecard

Southern Vipers; 240/8 (50 overs)	v	Northern Diamonds; 241/9 (50 overs)
Georgia Adams 57 (82); Katie Levick 3/36 (10 overs)		Emma Marlow 52 (84); Georgia Adams 4/30 (10 overs)

Northern Diamonds won by 1 wicket
Headingley Cricket Ground, Leeds
Umpires: Jasmine Naeem and Sue Redfern

- Southern Vipers won the toss and elected to bat.
- Points: Northern Diamonds 4, Southern Vipers 0

4 September 2024
10:30
Scorecard

Western Storm; 180 (45.5 overs)	v	Sunrisers; 150 (39.3 overs)
Amanda-Jade Wellington 45* (42); Sophie Munro 3/42 (10 overs)		Alice Macleod 48 (61); Chloe Skelton 5/29 (9.3 overs)

Western Storm won by 30 runs
Brunton Memorial Ground, Radlett
Umpires: Nigel Llong and Rose Dovey

- Sunrisers won the toss and elected to field.
- Points: Western Storm 4, Sunrisers 0

4 September 2024
10:30
Scorecard

South East Stars; 270 (49.5 overs)	v	Central Sparks; 250/9 (50 overs)
Kira Chathli 80 (78); Katie George 4/47 (10 overs)		Bethan Ellis 57 (83); Alexa Stonehouse 3/37 (8 overs)

South East Stars won by 20 runs
Scorers, Shirley
Umpires: Gabi Brown and Mark Newell

- Central Sparks won the toss and elected to field.
- Points: South East Stars 4, Central Sparks 0

4 September 2024
10:30
Scorecard

The Blaze; 197 (47 overs)	v	North West Thunder; 173 (45.4 overs)
Sarah Bryce 34 (37); Fi Morris 6/35 (9 overs)		Tara Norris 53* (56); Grace Ballinger 4/23 (9 overs)

The Blaze won by 24 runs
Rookwood Cricket Ground, Sale
Umpires: Anthony Harris and Naeem Ashraf

- North West Thunder won the toss and elected to field.
- Points: The Blaze 4, North West Thunder 0

6 September 2024
10:30
Scorecard

The Blaze; 166 (46.5 overs)	v	Central Sparks; 170/5 (41.2 overs)
Michaela Kirk 36 (55); Grace Potts 3/38 (8.5 overs)		Katie George 57* (90); Kirstie Gordon 2/24 (10 overs)

Central Sparks won by 5 wickets
Queen's Park, Chesterfield
Umpires: Naeem Ashraf and Rose Dovey

- Central Sparks won the toss and elected to field.
- Points: Central Sparks 4, The Blaze 0

7 September 2024
10:30
Scorecard

South East Stars; 275/8 (50 overs)	v	Northern Diamonds; 119 (36.1 overs)
Alice Davidson-Richards 79 (79); Beth Langston 2/44 (10 overs)		Phoebe Turner 49* (78); Alexa Stonehouse 4/27 (10 overs)

South East Stars won by 156 runs
Riverside Ground, Chester-le-Street
Umpires: Joanne Ibbotson and Tom Lungley

- Northern Diamonds won the toss and elected to field.
- Points: South East Stars 5, Northern Diamonds 0

7 September 2024
10:30
Scorecard

Sunrisers; 281 (50 overs)	v	Southern Vipers; 88/8 (10 overs)
Cordelia Griffith 55 (68); Naomi Dattani 5/51 (8 overs)		Ella McCaughan 15 (10); Eva Gray 2/22 (2 overs)

Sunrisers won by 5 runs (DLS)
Rose Bowl, Southampton
Umpires: Gabi Brown and Ian Blackwell

- Southern Vipers won the toss and elected to field.
- Southern Vipers innings reduced to 10 overs due to rain; target was 94.
- Points: Sunrisers 4, Southern Vipers 0

7 September 2024
10:30
Scorecard

North West Thunder; 216/9 (50 overs)	v	Western Storm; 69/2 (20 overs)
Eleanor Threlkeld 69* (93); Mollie Robbins 3/28 (10 overs)		Sophie Luff 16* (39); Grace Johnson 1/14 (4 overs)

North West Thunder won by 2 runs (DLS)
County Ground, Taunton
Umpires: Fiona Richards and Mark Newell

- North West Thunder won the toss and elected to bat.
- Western Storm innings curtailed at 20 overs due to rain; target was 72.
- Points: North West Thunder 4, Western Storm 0

== Knockout stage ==
Semi-finals
1	Northern Diamonds	232/8 (50 overs)
4	Sunrisers	234/3 (43.4 overs)
2	South East Stars	221/7 (48.5 overs)
3	Southern Vipers	219/9 (50 overs)

Final
SF1	Sunrisers	121/3 (25 overs)
SF2	South East Stars	212 (46.2 overs)

=== Semi-finals ===
14 September 2024
10:30
Scorecard

Northern Diamonds; 232/8 (50 overs)	v	Sunrisers; 234/3 (43.4 overs)
Emma Marlow 63 (102); Eva Gray 2/52 (10 overs)		Cordelia Griffith 68 (89); Katie Levick 2/45 (9 overs)

Sunrisers won by 7 wickets
Headingley Cricket Ground, Leeds
Umpires: Chris Watts and Rose Dovey

- Northern Diamonds won the toss and elected to bat.

14 September 2024
10:30
Scorecard

Southern Vipers; 219/9 (50 overs)	v	South East Stars; 221/7 (48.5 overs)
Nancy Harman 42 (59); Matilda Corteen-Coleman 3/33 (10 overs)		Alice Davidson-Richards 90* (109); Georgia Elwiss 3/39 (10 overs)

South East Stars won by 3 wickets
County Ground, Beckenham
Umpires: Neil Bainton and Sue Redfern

- Southern Vipers won the toss and elected to bat.

=== Final ===
21 September 2024
10:30
Scorecard

South East Stars; 212 (46.2 overs)	v	Sunrisers; 123/3 (25 overs)
Alice Davidson-Richards 93 (105); Kate Coppack 4/27 (10 overs)		Cordelia Griffith 57 (68); Kalea Moore 2/29 (8 overs)

Sunrisers won by 27 runs (DLS)
Grace Road, Leicester
Umpires: Jack Shantry and James Tredwell
Player of the match: Kate Coppack (Sunrisers)

- Sunrisers won the toss and elected to field.
- No further play was possible due to rain.

== Statistics ==
- Highest score by a team: The Blaze – 318/8 (44 overs) v South East Stars (30 June).
- Top score by an individual: Evelyn Jones – 136* (148) v North West Thunder (8 May).
- Best bowling figures by an individual: Phoebe Turner – 6/20 (9.0 overs) v North West Thunder (1 September).

=== Most runs ===
Player	Team	Matches	Innings	Runs	Average	HS	100s	50s
Alice Davidson-Richards	South East Stars	16	15	650	46.42	93	0	7
Evelyn Jones	Central Sparks/North West Thunder	15	15	556	42.76	136*	2	3
Grace Scrivens	Sunrisers	16	15	553	50.27	118*	1	4
Seren Smale	North West Thunder	13	13	515	39.61	99	0	4
Fran Wilson	Western Storm	14	14	500	41.66	81	0	5

Source: ESPNCricinfo

=== Most wickets ===
Player	Team	Overs	Wickets	Average	BBI	5w
Phoebe Turner	Northern Diamonds	110.0	23	23.39	6/20	1
Sophie Munro	The Blaze/Sunrisers	77.0	22	14.63	5/25	1
Hannah Jones	North West Thunder	102.3	22	20.90	4/50	0
Ryana MacDonald-Gay	South East Stars	72.2	21	16.71	5/31	1
Georgia Adams	Southern Vipers	106.1	21	20.23	4/30	0

Source: ESPNCricinfo
