= Grace Potts =

English cricketer (born 2002)

Personal information
- Full name: Grace Elizabeth Ann Potts
- Born: 12 July 2002 (age 24); Newcastle-under-Lyme
- Batting: Right-handed
- Bowling: Right-arm medium
- Role: Bowler

Domestic team information
- Years: Team
- 2018–2022: Staffordshire
- 2020–2024: Central Sparks
- 2022: Manchester Originals
- 2023–2024: Trent Rockets
- 2025–: Lancashire
- 2026: Welsh Fire

Career statistics
Competition	WLA	WT20
Matches	60	66
Runs scored	197	60
Batting average	17.90	8.57
100s/50s	0/0	0/0
Top score	30*	12
Balls bowled	2,500	1,151
Wickets	61	53
Bowling average	30.98	24.22
5 wickets in innings	0	0
10 wickets in match	0	0
Best bowling	4/37	4/33
Catches/stumpings	20/–	11/–
- Source: CricketArchive, 22 April 2026

Grace Elizabeth Ann Potts (born 12 July 2002) is an English cricketer who currently plays for Lancashire. She plays as a right-arm medium bowler. She has previously played for Staffordshire, Central Sparks, Manchester Originals and Trent Rockets.

== Domestic career ==
Potts played cricket at Newcastle-under-Lyme School. She made her county debut in 2018, for Staffordshire against Leicestershire. That season, she took 3 wickets at an average of 21.66 in the County Championship and 4 wickets at an average of 28.75 in the Twenty20 Cup. The following season, Potts was part of the Staffordshire side that won Division 3A in the County Championship and Division 3C in the 2019 Women's Twenty20 Cup. She took four wickets at an average of 25.50 for the side in the 2022 Women's Twenty20 Cup.

In 2020, Potts was named in the Central Sparks squad for the Rachael Heyhoe Flint Trophy, but did not play a match. She was retained in the squad for the 2021 season, and made her debut for the side on 30 August 2021, against South East Stars in the Charlotte Edwards Cup, in which she took 2/23 from her 3 overs. In 2022, she was Central Sparks' leading wicket-taker in both the Charlotte Edwards Cup and the Rachael Heyhoe Flint Trophy, with 12 and 10 wickets respectively. She took her Twenty20 best bowling figures in a match against South East Stars, with 4/36. She also signed for Manchester Originals in The Hundred, playing five matches.

In January 2023, it was announced that Potts had signed her first professional contract with Central Sparks. That season, she played 16 matches for the side, across the Rachael Heyhoe Flint Trophy and the Charlotte Edwards Cup, taking 11 wickets. She also moved to Trent Rockets in The Hundred, playing one match. In 2024, she played 24 matches for Central Sparks, across the Rachael Heyhoe Flint Trophy and the Charlotte Edwards Cup, and was the side's joint-leading wicket-taker in the Rachael Heyhoe Flint Trophy, with 15 wickets at an average of 28.06.

== International career ==
Potts was drafted into the England squad for their Test match against South Africa in December 2024.
