= Jack Shantry =

English cricketer (born 1988)

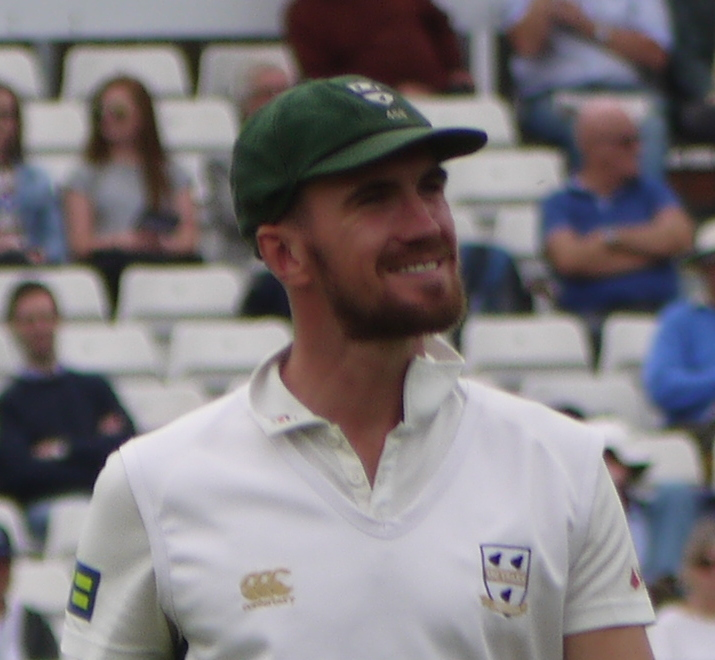

Personal information
- Full name: Jack David Shantry
- Born: 29 January 1988 (age 38); Shrewsbury, Shropshire, England
- Height: 6 ft 4 in (1.93 m)
- Batting: Left-handed
- Bowling: Left-arm medium
- Relatives: Adam Shantry (brother); Brian Shantry (father)

Domestic team information
- Years: Team
- 2009–2018: Worcestershire (squad no. 11)
- FC debut: 25 August 2009 Worcestershire v Nottinghamshire
- LA debut: 23 August 2009 Worcestershire v Essex

Umpiring information
- WODIs umpired: 1 (2025)
- FC umpired: 40 (2022–present)
- LA umpired: 29 (2022–present)
- T20 umpired: 36 (2022–present)

Career statistics
Competition	FC	LA	T20
Matches	92	73	90
Runs scored	1,640	188	87
Batting average	19.06	11.05	7.25
100s/50s	2/2	0/0	0/0
Top score	106	31	12*
Balls bowled	16,197	2,999	1,930
Wickets	266	92	92
Bowling average	29.25	30.43	28.21
5 wickets in innings	12	0	0
10 wickets in match	2	0	0
Best bowling	7/60	4/29	4/33
Catches/stumpings	30/–	18/–	20/–
- Source: CricketArchive, 05 October 2026

Jack David Shantry (born 29 January 1988) is a former English cricketer who played county cricket for Worcestershire. He is now an umpire.

== Career ==
Shantry played for Shropshire Under-17s as early as July 2004, scoring 64 at the top of the order against Yorkshire Under-17s. He made several further appearances for Shropshire Under-17s, and also played for Shrewsbury Cricket Club, appearing in the Cockspur Cup and making an appearance against Kidderminster Victoria in the Birmingham and District Premier League.

In 2007 and 2008, Shantry progressed to a mixture of senior cricket at minor counties level with Shropshire County Cricket Club and Second XI cricket for Worcestershire. He took 7/34 for Worcestershire Second XI against Leicestershire II in June 2008, and scored 88 for Shropshire against Wales Minor Counties in August of the same year. Between these two feats, in July, he had appeared for Shropshire in the final of the Resource Bank Twenty20 Cup, which they lost to a star-studded Lashings World XI side despite Shantry's 3/11.

Shantry made his senior debut for Worcestershire in a Pro40 match against Essex at Colchester on 23 August 2009, taking the wicket of Ravi Bopara and not batting. Two days later, he made his maiden appearance in first-class cricket when he was selected for Worcestershire's County Championship clash with Nottinghamshire at New Road. In a drawn game, Shantry claimed the wickets of Bilal Shafayat and Mark Ealham, but was lbw for nought in his only innings. He retained his place in the side in both one-day and four-day cricket, and so his club cricket appearances, now for Walsall, became less frequent.

Shantry pressed his claims for a regular place in the side in his first game of the 2010 season, a non-first-class warm-up match against Bradford/Leeds UCCE. He claimed 5–18 in the first innings, and opened the bowling in the second innings, taking a wicket with the first ball of the innings and finishing with 7–47, to complete a match haul of 12 wickets for 65. Worcestershire went on to win the game.

In September 2014, he scored his maiden first-class century (and took ten wickets in a first-class match for the first time) in a victory over Surrey that guaranteed Worcestershire promotion to Division 1.

In June 2018, Shantry announced his retirement from all cricket with immediate effect, due to ongoing back injuries. In 2022, Shantry became an umpire.
