= 2021 Southern Vipers season =

Southern Vipers
2021 season
- Coach: Charlotte Edwards
- Captain: Georgia Adams
- Overseas player: Gaby Lewis
- RHFT: Champions
- CEC: 3rd
- Most runs: RHFT: Georgia Elwiss (265); CEC: Georgia Adams (215)
- Most wickets: RHFT: Charlotte Taylor (13); CEC: Tara Norris (13)
- Most catches: RHFT: Georgia Adams (10); CEC: Charlie Dean (6)
- Most wicket-keeping dismissals: RHFT: Carla Rudd (10); CEC: Carla Rudd (5)

The 2021 season saw Southern Vipers compete in the 50 over Rachael Heyhoe Flint Trophy, of which they were defending champions, and the new Twenty20 competition, the Charlotte Edwards Cup. The side topped the group stage of the Rachael Heyhoe Flint Trophy, winning six of their seven matches and therefore progressing straight to the final. In the final they faced Northern Diamonds, who made 183 batting first. In response, Vipers were reduced to 109/7, but an unbroken partnership of 78 between Emily Windsor and Tara Norris ensured the side defended their title, winning by 3 wickets with 2 balls to spare.

In the Charlotte Edwards Cup, the side finished second in Group A, winning four of their six matches, to progress to the semi-final as the best runner-up in the group stage. There, they played Northern Diamonds, who made 135/6 batting first. In response, Vipers were bowled out for 117 in 20 overs and were therefore eliminated from the competition.

The side was captained by Georgia Adams and coached by Charlotte Edwards. They played three home matches at the Rose Bowl, two at the County Ground, Hove and one at Arundel Castle Cricket Ground.

== Squad ==
Southern Vipers announced their initial 18-player squad on 18 May 2021. Sophie Mitchelmore, Chiara Green and Abbie Whybrow were added to the squad on 28 August 2021. Gaby Lewis was signed as an overseas player for the remainder of the season on 9 September 2021. Age given is at the start of Southern Vipers' first match of the season (29 May 2021).

Name	Nationality	Birth date	Batting Style	Bowling Style	Notes
Batters
Georgia Adams	England	4 October 1993 (aged 27)	Right-handed	Right-arm off break	Captain
Maia Bouchier	England	5 December 1998 (aged 22)	Right-handed	Right-arm medium	
Ella McCaughan	England	26 September 2002 (aged 18)	Right-handed	Right-arm leg break	
Emily Windsor	England	14 June 1997 (aged 23)	Right-handed	Right-arm medium	
All-rounders
Ella Chandler	England	19 October 2000 (aged 20)	Right-handed	Right-arm medium	
Charlie Dean	England	22 December 2000 (aged 20)	Right-handed	Right-arm off break	
Georgia Elwiss	England	31 May 1991 (aged 29)	Right-handed	Right-arm medium	
Gaby Lewis	Ireland	27 March 2001 (aged 20)	Right-handed	Right-arm leg break	Overseas player
Sophie Mitchelmore	England	21 January 2001 (aged 20)	Right-handed	Right-arm medium	
Alice Monaghan	England	20 March 2000 (aged 21)	Right-handed	Right-arm medium	
Paige Scholfield	England	19 December 1995 (aged 25)	Right-handed	Right-arm fast-medium	
Charlotte Taylor	England	2 February 1994 (aged 27)	Right-handed	Right-arm off break	
Danni Wyatt	England	22 April 1991 (aged 30)	Right-handed	Right-arm off break	
Wicket-keepers
Ariana Dowse	England	8 February 2001 (aged 20)	Right-handed	—	
Carla Rudd	England	30 December 1993 (aged 27)	Right-handed	—	
Abbie Whybrow	England	14 February 2002 (aged 19)	Right-handed	—	
Bowlers
Lauren Bell	England	2 January 2001 (aged 20)	Right-handed	Right-arm fast-medium	
Chiara Green	England	18 October 1993 (aged 27)	Right-handed	Right-arm off break	
Gemma Lane	England	13 May 2003 (aged 18)	Right-handed	Right-arm medium	
Cassidy McCarthy	England	23 July 2002 (aged 18)	Right-handed	Right-arm medium	
Tara Norris	England	4 June 1998 (aged 22)	Left-handed	Left-arm medium	
Finty Trussler	England	8 May 2003 (aged 18)	Right-handed	Right-arm leg break	

== Rachael Heyhoe Flint Trophy ==
=== Season standings ===
Pos	Team	Pld	W	L	T	NR	BP	Pts	NRR
1	Southern Vipers (Q)	7	6	1	0	0	3	27	0.417
2	Northern Diamonds (Q)	7	5	2	0	0	3	23	1.182
3	Central Sparks (Q)	7	5	2	0	0	2	22	0.822
4	Lightning	7	3	4	0	0	1	13	0.274
5	South East Stars	7	3	4	0	0	1	13	−0.226
6	Western Storm	7	3	4	0	0	1	13	−0.462
7	North West Thunder	7	3	4	0	0	1	13	−0.620
8	Sunrisers	7	0	7	0	0	0	0	−1.598

Source: ESPN Cricinfo

Advanced to the final
Advanced to the play-off

== Fixtures ==
29 May 2021
10:30 BST
Scorecard

Lightning; 214/9 (50 overs)	v	Southern Vipers; 215/6 (46.5 overs)
Tammy Beaumont 57 (91); Tara Norris 3/47 (10 overs)		Danni Wyatt 53 (57); Kirstie Gordon 4/35 (10 overs)

Southern Vipers won by 4 wickets
Rose Bowl, Southampton
Umpires: Sophie McLelland and Tom Lungley

- Lightning won the toss and elected to bat.
- Points: Southern Vipers 4, Lightning 0

31 May 2021
10:30 BST
Scorecard

South East Stars; 137 (39.5 overs)	v	Southern Vipers; 138/3 (28.4 overs)
Bryony Smith 41 (38); Charlotte Taylor 4/21 (8 overs)		Danni Wyatt 64* (88); Bryony Smith 2/25 (4 overs)

Southern Vipers won by 7 wickets
County Cricket Ground, Beckenham
Umpires: Rob White and Sarah Bartlett

- Southern Vipers won the toss and elected to field.
- Points: Southern Vipers 5, South East Stars 0

5 June 2021
10:30 BST
Scorecard

Central Sparks; 224 (49.2 overs)	v	Southern Vipers; 104 (27.5 overs)
Evelyn Jones 55 (103); Charlotte Taylor 3/22 (10 overs)		Danni Wyatt 61 (81); Emily Arlott 5/29 (8 overs)

Central Sparks won by 120 runs
County Ground, Hove
Umpires: Neil Pratt and Yvonne Dolphin-Cooper

- Central Sparks won the toss and elected to bat.
- Points: Central Sparks 5, Southern Vipers 0

12 June 2021
13:00 BST (D/N)
Scorecard

Western Storm; 177 (49.3 overs)	v	Southern Vipers; 178/2 (34.5 overs)
Katie George 37 (60); Charlie Dean 3/27 (10 overs)		Georgia Adams 77 (101); Fi Morris 1/37 (6 overs)

Southern Vipers won by 8 wickets
County Ground, Taunton
Umpires: Mark Newell and Sophie McLelland
Player of the match: Georgia Adams (Southern Vipers)

- Western Storm won the toss and elected to bat.
- Points: Southern Vipers 5, Western Storm 0

10 September 2021
10:30 BST
Scorecard

North West Thunder; 110 (32.5 overs)	v	Southern Vipers; 112/7 (33.5 overs)
Kate Cross 57 (86); Tara Norris 4/14 (7.5 overs)		Ella McCaughan 41 (47); Hannah Jones 2/9 (5 overs)

Southern Vipers won by 3 wickets
Rookwood Cricket Ground, Sale
Umpires: Mike Burns and Joanne Ibbotson

- Southern Vipers won the toss and elected to field.
- Points: Southern Vipers 5, North West Thunder 0

12 September 2021
10:30 BST
Scorecard

Southern Vipers; 309/9 (50 overs)	v	Sunrisers; 308/6 (50 overs)
Georgia Elwiss 112* (118); Sonali Patel 3/46 (10 overs)		Cordelia Griffith 91 (82); Georgia Adams 2/36 (6 overs)

Southern Vipers won by 1 run
County Ground, Chelmsford
Umpires: Sarah Bartlett and Sophie McLelland
Player of the match: Georgia Elwiss (Southern Vipers)

- Sunrisers won the toss and elected to field.
- Points: Southern Vipers 4, Sunrisers 0

18 September 2021
10:30 BST
Scorecard

Northern Diamonds; 256 (48.3 overs)	v	Southern Vipers; 260/5 (48.5 overs)
Bess Heath 71 (51); Lauren Bell 2/29 (10 overs)		Georgia Elwiss 84* (77); Phoebe Graham 3/44 (10 overs)

Southern Vipers won by 5 wickets
Rose Bowl, Southampton
Umpires: Sophie McLelland and Ian Ramage

- Northern Diamonds won the toss and elected to bat.
- Points: Southern Vipers 4, Northern Diamonds 0

=== Final ===
25 September 2021
10:30 BST
Scorecard

Northern Diamonds; 183 (49.2 overs)	v	Southern Vipers; 187/7 (49.4 overs)
Ami Campbell 60 (73); Georgia Adams 4/35 (10 overs)		Emily Windsor 47* (97); Jenny Gunn 3/31 (10 overs)

Southern Vipers won by 3 wickets
County Ground, Northampton
Umpires: Jasmine Naeem and Neil Pratt
Player of the match: Emily Windsor (Southern Vipers)

- Northern Diamonds won the toss and elected to bat.

=== Tournament statistics ===
==== Batting ====
Player	Matches	Innings	Runs	Average	High score	100s	50s
Georgia Elwiss	7	7	265	53.00	112*	1	1
Georgia Adams	8	8	233	29.12	77	0	3
Danni Wyatt	4	4	206	68.66	64*	0	3
Maia Bouchier	7	7	195	32.50	57*	0	1
Emily Windsor	8	6	103	25.75	47*	0	0

Source: ESPN Cricinfo Qualification: 100 runs.

==== Bowling ====
Player	Matches	Overs	Wickets	Average	Economy	BBI	5wi
Charlotte Taylor	8	72.0	13	18.15	3.27	4/21	0
Georgia Adams	8	37.5	12	14.41	4.57	4/35	0
Tara Norris	8	68.5	11	30.09	4.80	4/14	0
Charlie Dean	4	39.5	10	13.80	3.46	3/27	0
Lauren Bell	6	53.0	9	26.44	4.49	3/40	0
Paige Scholfield	5	21.0	6	16.50	4.71	3/16	0
Georgia Elwiss	7	53.2	5	49.60	4.65	1/25	0

Source: ESPN Cricinfo Qualification: 5 wickets.

== Charlotte Edwards Cup ==
=== Group A ===
Pos	Team	Pld	W	L	T	NR	BP	Pts	NRR
1	South East Stars (Q)	6	5	1	0	0	1	21	1.050
2	Southern Vipers (Q)	6	4	2	0	0	3	19	0.875
3	Central Sparks	6	3	3	0	0	0	12	−0.669
4	Lightning	6	0	6	0	0	0	0	−1.139

Source: ESPN Cricinfo
- Advanced to the final
- Advanced to the semi-final

=== Fixtures ===
26 June 2021
18:30 BST (D/N)
Scorecard

Central Sparks; 83 (17.5 overs)	v	Southern Vipers; 85/2 (13.1 overs)
Marie Kelly 36 (41); Charlie Dean 5/19 (3.5 overs)		Danni Wyatt 45 (33); Emily Arlott 1/13 (2 overs)

Southern Vipers won by 8 wickets
Edgbaston, Birmingham
Umpires: Anna Harris and Sarah Bartlett

- Southern Vipers won the toss and elected to field.
- Points: Southern Vipers 5, Central Sparks 0

3 July 2021
14:30 BST
Scorecard

Southern Vipers; 134/7 (20 overs)	v	Lightning; 88 (19.5 overs)
Georgia Adams 37 (38); Kathryn Bryce 2/15 (4 overs)		Sonia Odedra 16 (22); Michaela Kirk 16 (22); Tara Norris 4/14 (3.5 overs)

Southern Vipers won by 46 runs
Arundel Castle, Arundel
Umpires: Chris Watt and Sophie McLelland

- Lightning won the toss and elected to field.
- Points: Southern Vipers 5, Lightning 0

10 July 2021
14:30 BST
Scorecard

South East Stars; 127/7 (20 overs)	v	Southern Vipers; 130/3 (15.4 overs)
Kira Chathli 30 (20); Charlotte Taylor 3/12 (4 overs)		Maia Bouchier 53* (43); Bryony Smith 2/26 (3.4 overs)

Southern Vipers won by 7 wickets
County Cricket Ground, Beckenham
Umpires: Jasmine Naeem and Mark Newell

- Southern Vipers won the toss and elected to field.
- Points: Southern Vipers 5, South East Stars 0

25 August 2021
14:30 BST
Scorecard

Southern Vipers; 162/4 (20 overs)	v	Central Sparks; 163/4 (19 overs)
Georgia Adams 88* (60); Issy Wong 1/20 (4 overs)		Marie Kelly 100* (53); Charlotte Taylor 2/36 (4 overs)

Central Sparks won by 6 wickets
County Cricket Ground, Hove
Umpires: Ben Debenham and Jasmine Naeem

- Central Sparks won the toss and elected to field.
- Points: Central Sparks 4, Southern Vipers 0

28 August 2021
14:30 BST
Scorecard

South East Stars; 167/4 (20 overs)	v	Southern Vipers; 147/7 (20 overs)
Alice Capsey 61 (46); Georgia Adams 1/16 (2 overs)		Georgia Elwiss 45 (33); Alice Capsey 2/9 (2 overs)

South East Stars won by 20 runs
Rose Bowl, Southampton
Umpires: Sarah Bartlett and Anna Harris

- Southern Vipers won the toss and elected to field.
- Points: South East Stars 4, Southern Vipers 0

30 August 2021
14:30 BST
Scorecard

Lightning; 124/9 (20 overs)	v	Southern Vipers; 125/3 (20 overs)
Abigail Freeborn 27 (29); Tara Norris 3/26 (4 overs)		Paige Scholfield 41* (36); Kirstie Gordon 2/20 (4 overs)

Southern Vipers won by 7 wickets
County Cricket Ground, Derby
Umpires: Grace Bambury and Sue Redfern

- Lightning won the toss and elected to bat.
- Points: Southern Vipers 4, Lightning 0

==== Semi-final ====
5 September 2021
12:00 BST
Scorecard

Northern Diamonds; 135/6 (20 overs)	v	Southern Vipers; 117 (20 overs)
Lauren Winfield-Hill 65 (49); Lauren Bell 1/15 (4 overs)		Emily Windsor 32 (36); Jenny Gunn 4/26 (4 overs)

Northern Diamonds won by 18 runs
Rose Bowl, Southampton
Umpires: Anna Harris and Sue Redfern
Player of the match: Lauren Winfield-Hill (Northern Diamonds)

- Northern Diamonds won the toss and elected to bat.

=== Tournament statistics ===
==== Batting ====
Player	Matches	Innings	Runs	Average	High score	100s	50s
Georgia Adams	7	7	215	35.83	88*	0	2
Georgia Elwiss	7	7	109	18.16	45	0	0
Maia Bouchier	4	4	104	52.00	53*	0	1
Paige Scholfield	7	6	68	17.00	41*	0	0
Charlie Dean	4	3	65	21.66	31	0	0
Emily Windsor	7	5	60	30.00	32	0	0

Source: ESPN Cricinfo Qualification: 50 runs.

==== Bowling ====
Player	Matches	Overs	Wickets	Average	Economy	BBI	5wi
Tara Norris	7	25.5	13	13.30	6.69	4/14	0
Georgia Elwiss	7	27.0	10	18.20	6.74	3/16	0
Charlotte Taylor	7	28.0	9	17.66	5.67	3/12	0
Charlie Dean	4	14.5	7	13.00	6.13	5/19	1
Lauren Bell	6	23.0	5	23.60	5.13	2/26	0

Source: ESPN Cricinfo Qualification: 5 wickets.

== Season statistics ==
=== Batting ===
Player	Rachael Heyhoe Flint Trophy								Charlotte Edwards Cup							
Player	Matches	Innings	Runs	High score	Average	Strike rate	100s	50s	Matches	Innings	Runs	High score	Average	Strike rate	100s	50s
Georgia Adams	8	8	233	77	29.12	64.90	0	3	7	7	215	88*	35.83	119.44	0	2
Lauren Bell	6	1	1	1	1.00	25.00	0	0	6	1	0	0	0.00	0.00	0	0
Maia Bouchier	7	7	195	57*	32.50	75.58	0	1	4	4	104	53*	52.00	98.11	0	1
Ella Chandler	–	–	–	–	–	–	–	–	3	2	27	23	13.50	93.10	0	0
Charlie Dean	4	3	34	32	17.00	58.62	0	0	4	3	65	31	21.66	98.48	0	0
Georgia Elwiss	7	7	265	112*	53.00	93.30	1	1	7	7	109	45	18.16	96.46	0	0
Chiara Green	–	–	–	–	–	–	–	–	1	–	–	–	–	–	–	–
Gaby Lewis	4	4	97	39	24.25	65.10	0	0	–	–	–	–	–	–	–	–
Ella McCaughan	7	6	70	41	14.00	80.45	0	0	3	1	13	13	13.00	92.85	0	0
Sophie Mitchelmore	–	–	–	–	–	–	–	–	2	1	4	4*	–	200.00	0	0
Alice Monaghan	4	2	0	0*	–	0.00	0	0	3	2	35	30*	35.00	145.83	0	0
Tara Norris	8	5	47	40*	15.66	78.33	0	0	7	4	34	17	8.50	69.38	0	0
Carla Rudd	8	4	24	13	6.00	33.80	0	0	7	2	14	5	7.00	100.00	0	0
Paige Scholfield	5	5	93	38*	31.00	69.40	0	0	7	6	68	41*	17.00	90.66	0	0
Charlotte Taylor	8	1	0	0	0.00	0.00	0	0	7	1	2	2*	–	100.00	0	0
Emily Windsor	8	6	103	47*	25.75	51.24	0	0	7	5	60	32	30.00	84.50	0	0
Danni Wyatt	4	4	206	64*	68.66	80.46	0	3	2	2	49	45	24.50	132.43	0	0
Source: ESPN Cricinfo

=== Bowling ===
Player	Rachael Heyhoe Flint Trophy							Charlotte Edwards Cup						
Player	Matches	Overs	Wickets	Average	Economy	BBI	5wi	Matches	Overs	Wickets	Average	Economy	BBI	5wi
Georgia Adams	8	37.5	12	14.41	4.57	4/35	0	7	5.0	2	25.00	10.00	1/16	0
Lauren Bell	6	53.0	9	26.44	4.49	3/40	0	6	23.0	5	23.60	5.13	2/26	0
Maia Bouchier	7	5.0	1	33.00	6.60	1/20	0	–	–	–	–	–	–	–
Charlie Dean	4	39.5	10	13.80	3.46	3/27	0	4	14.5	7	13.00	6.13	5/19	0
Georgia Elwiss	7	53.2	5	49.60	4.65	1/25	0	7	27.0	10	18.20	6.74	3/16	0
Chiara Green	–	–	–	–	–	–	–	1	3.0	1	25.00	8.33	1/25	0
Alice Monaghan	4	2.0	1	13.00	6.50	1/13	0	–	–	–	–	–	–	–
Tara Norris	8	68.5	11	30.09	4.80	4/14	0	7	25.5	13	13.30	6.69	4/14	0
Paige Scholfield	5	21.0	6	16.50	4.71	3/16	0	7	10.0	0	–	6.50	–	0
Charlotte Taylor	8	72.0	13	18.15	3.27	4/21	0	7	28.0	9	17.66	5.67	3/12	0
Emily Windsor	8	4.3	0	–	3.33	–	0	–	–	–	–	–	–	–
Danni Wyatt	4	12.0	3	16.00	4.00	3/19	0	–	–	–	–	–	–	–
Source: ESPN Cricinfo

=== Fielding ===
Player	Rachael Heyhoe Flint Trophy			Charlotte Edwards Cup		
Player	Matches	Innings	Catches	Matches	Innings	Catches
Georgia Adams	8	8	10	7	7	3
Lauren Bell	6	6	0	6	6	2
Maia Bouchier	7	7	1	4	4	4
Ella Chandler	–	–	–	3	3	0
Charlie Dean	4	4	3	4	4	6
Georgia Elwiss	7	7	3	7	7	1
Chiara Green	–	–	–	1	1	0
Gaby Lewis	4	4	2	–	–	–
Ella McCaughan	7	7	0	3	3	0
Sophie Mitchelmore	–	–	–	2	2	0
Alice Monaghan	4	4	1	3	3	3
Tara Norris	8	8	4	7	7	2
Paige Scholfield	5	5	4	7	7	3
Charlotte Taylor	8	8	0	7	7	1
Emily Windsor	8	8	1	7	7	0
Danni Wyatt	4	4	2	2	2	0
Source: ESPN Cricinfo

=== Wicket-keeping ===
Player	Rachael Heyhoe Flint Trophy				Charlotte Edwards Cup			
Player	Matches	Innings	Catches	Stumpings	Matches	Innings	Catches	Stumpings
Carla Rudd	8	8	4	6	7	7	2	3
Source: ESPN Cricinfo
