= 2018 Southern Vipers season =

Southern Vipers
2018 season
- Coach: Nicholas Denning
- Captain: Suzie Bates
- Overseas player: Suzie Bates; Mignon du Preez; Amelia Kerr
- WCSL: Group stage, 6th
- Most runs: Suzie Bates (245)
- Most wickets: Tash Farrant (10); Amelia Kerr (10)
- Most catches: Danni Wyatt (6)
- Most wicket-keeping dismissals: Carla Rudd (8)

The 2018 season was Southern Vipers' third season, in which they competed in the Women's Cricket Super League, a Twenty20 competition. The side finished bottom of the group stage, winning two of their ten matches.

The side was captained by Suzie Bates and coached by Nicholas Denning. They played three of their home matches at the Rose Bowl and one home match apiece at the Arundel Castle Cricket Ground and the County Ground, Hove.

== Squad ==
Southern Vipers announced a 15-player squad on 5 July 2018. Tash Farrant was ruled out of the squad during the tournament due to injury and replaced by Emily Windsor for the final four group-stage matches. Age given is at the start of Southern Vipers' first match of the season (22 July 2018).

Name	Nationality	Birth date	Batting Style	Bowling Style	Notes
Batters
Maia Bouchier	England	5 December 1998 (aged 19)	Right-handed	Right-arm medium	
Mignon du Preez	South Africa	13 June 1989 (aged 29)	Right-handed	Right-arm off break	Overseas player
All-rounders
Suzie Bates	New Zealand	16 September 1987 (aged 30)	Right-handed	Right-arm medium	Captain; Overseas player
Arran Brindle	England	23 November 1981 (aged 36)	Right-handed	Right-arm medium	
Charlie Dean	England	22 December 2000 (aged 17)	Right-handed	Right-arm off break	
Amelia Kerr	New Zealand	13 October 2000 (aged 17)	Right-handed	Right-arm leg break	Overseas player
Fi Morris	England	31 January 1994 (aged 24)	Right-handed	Right-arm off break	
Paige Scholfield	England	19 December 1995 (aged 22)	Right-handed	Right-arm medium	
Emily Windsor	England	14 June 1997 (aged 21)	Right-handed	Right-arm medium	Injury replacement player
Danni Wyatt	England	22 April 1991 (aged 27)	Right-handed	Right-arm off break	
Wicket-keepers
Tammy Beaumont	England	11 March 1991 (aged 27)	Right-handed	—	
Sara McGlashan	New Zealand	28 March 1982 (aged 36)	Right-handed	—	UK Passport
Carla Rudd	England	30 December 1993 (aged 24)	Right-handed	Right-arm medium	
Bowlers
Lauren Bell	England	2 January 2001 (aged 17)	Right-handed	Right-arm medium	
Tash Farrant	England	29 May 1996 (aged 22)	Left-handed	Left-arm medium	
Katie George	England	7 April 1999 (aged 19)	Right-handed	Left-arm medium	

== Women's Cricket Super League ==
=== Season standings ===
Pos	Team	Pld	W	L	T	NR	BP	Pts	NRR
1	Loughborough Lightning	10	7	3	0	0	5	33	1.361
2	Western Storm	10	6	3	0	1	4	30	0.919
3	Surrey Stars	10	5	4	0	1	2	24	−0.404
4	Lancashire Thunder	10	5	5	0	0	1	21	−0.825
5	Yorkshire Diamonds	10	3	6	0	1	1	15	−0.290
6	Southern Vipers	10	2	7	0	1	0	10	−0.490

Source: ESPN Cricinfo

Advanced to the Final.
Advanced to the Semi-final.

=== League stage ===
22 July 2018
14:30
Scorecard

Surrey Stars; 141/9 (20 overs)	v	Southern Vipers; 145/3 (17 overs)
Sophia Dunkley 66 (43); Fi Morris 4/22 (4 overs)		Tammy Beaumont 62* (45); Marizanne Kapp 2/21 (4 overs)

Southern Vipers won by 7 wickets
Woodbridge Road, Guildford
Umpires: Sue Redfern and Mark Newell

- Southern Vipers won the toss and elected to field.
- Points: Southern Vipers 4, Surrey Stars 0

25 July 2018
14:30
Scorecard

Southern Vipers; 105 (19.3 overs)	v	Loughborough Lightning; 109/4 (18.5 overs)
Tammy Beaumont 37 (39); Sophie Devine 3/21 (4 overs)		Elyse Villani 35 (33); Amelia Kerr 1/6 (4 overs)

Loughborough Lightning won by 6 wickets
Rose Bowl, Southampton
Umpires: Steve O'Shaughnessy and Neil Mallender

- Loughborough Lightning won the toss and elected to field
- Points: Loughborough Lightning 4, Southern Vipers 0

29 July 2018
14:30
Scorecard

Lancashire Thunder; 137/6 (20 overs)	v	Southern Vipers; 133/9 (20 overs)
Evelyn Jones 69 (65); Tash Farrant 3/24 (4 overs)		Suzie Bates 40 (36); Emma Lamb 4/17 (4 overs)

Lancashire Thunder won by 4 runs
Aigburth Cricket Ground, Liverpool
Umpires: Sue Redfern and James Middlebrook

- Southern Vipers won the toss and elected to field.
- Points: Lancashire Thunder 4, Southern Vipers 0

31 July 2018
14:30
Scorecard

Southern Vipers; 91 (18.1 overs)	v	Western Storm; 93/1 (9.3 overs)
Sara McGlashan 31 (30); Claire Nicholas 2/17 (4 overs)		Smriti Mandhana 43* (27); Arran Brindle 1/13 (2 overs)

Western Storm won by 9 wickets
Arundel Castle Cricket Ground, Arundel
Umpires: Chris Watts and Rob White
Player of the match: Smriti Mandhana (Western Storm

- Western Storm won the toss and elected to field.
- Points: Western Storm 5, Southern Vipers 0

2 August 2018
14:30
Scorecard

Yorkshire Diamonds; 175/5 (20 overs)	v	Southern Vipers; 163/9 (20 overs)
Lauren Winfield 64 (38); Amelia Kerr 2/27 (4 overs)		Suzie Bates 34 (22); Katherine Brunt 5/26 (4 overs)

Yorkshire Diamonds won by 12 runs
Clifton Park, York
Umpires: Tom Lungley and Sue Redfern

- Yorkshire Diamonds won the toss and elected to bat.
- Points: Yorkshire Diamonds 4, Southern Vipers 0

4 August 2018
14:30
Scorecard

Southern Vipers; 172/6 (20 overs)	v	Loughborough Lightning; 174/7 (19.4 overs)
Sara McGlashan 55* (28); Georgia Elwiss 2/46 (4 overs)		Elyse Villani 61* (38); Danni Wyatt 1/4 (1 over)

Loughborough Lightning won by 3 wickets
Haslegrave Ground, Loughborough
Umpires: Sue Redfern and Ian Ramage
Player of the match: Elyse Villani (Loughborough Lightning)

- Southern Vipers won the toss and elected to bat.
- Points: Loughborough Lightning 4, Southern Vipers 0

8 August 2018
14:30
Scorecard

Southern Vipers; 159/7 (20 overs)	v	Yorkshire Diamonds; 143 (19.5 overs)
Tammy Beaumont 64 (37); Katie Levick 3/35 (4 overs)		Thea Brookes 45 (36); Suzie Bates 4/26 (3.5 overs)

Southern Vipers won by 16 runs
Rose Bowl, Southampton
Umpires: Neil Bainton and Tim Robinson
Player of the match: Tammy Beaumont (Southern Vipers)

- Yorkshire Diamonds won the toss and elected to field.
- Points: Southern Vipers 4, Yorkshire Diamonds 0

11 August 2018
14:30
Scorecard

Southern Vipers; 62/2 (8.5 overs)	v	Western Storm
Danni Wyatt 27 (20); Danielle Gibson 1/8 (1.5 overs)

No result
Nevil Road, Bristol
Umpires: Rob White and Chris Watts

- Western Storm won the toss and elected to field.
- Points: Western Storm 2, Southern Vipers 2

14 August 2018
14:30
Scorecard

Southern Vipers; 147/9 (20 overs)	v	Surrey Stars; 148/6 (19.3 overs)
Suzie Bates 82 (57); Nat Sciver 4/32 (4 overs)		Nat Sciver 46 (33); Suzie Bates 2/22 (4 overs)

Surrey Stars won by 4 wickets
County Cricket Ground, Hove
Umpires: Michael Gough and Sue Redfern
Player of the match: Nat Sciver (Surrey Stars)

- Surrey Stars won the toss and elected to field.
- Points: Surrey Stars 4, Southern Vipers 0

18 August 2018
14:30
Scorecard

Lancashire Thunder; 162/3 (20 overs)	v	Southern Vipers; 153 (19.4 overs)
Harmanpreet Kaur 44* (20); Paige Scholfield 1/28 (4 overs)		Danni Wyatt 36 (21); Sophie Ecclestone 4/20 (4 overs)

Lancashire Thunder won by 9 runs
Rose Bowl, Southampton
Umpires: Mark Newell and Chris Watts
Player of the match: Sophie Ecclestone (Lancashire Thunder)

- Lancashire Thunder won the toss and elected to field.
- Points: Lancashire Thunder 4, Southern Vipers 0

== Statistics ==
=== Batting ===
Player	Matches	Innings	NO	Runs	HS	Average	Strike rate	100s	50s	4s	6s
Suzie Bates	10	10	1	245	82	27.22	115.02	0	1	33	1
Tammy Beaumont	8	7	1	198	64	33.00	127.74	0	2	30	1
Lauren Bell	4	2	1	5	4*	5.00	166.66	0	0	1	0
Maia Bouchier	4	4	0	40	17	10.00	93.02	0	0	1	1
Arran Brindle	8	6	0	60	26	10.00	81.08	0	0	6	0
Charlie Dean	5	4	4	7	3*	–	58.33	0	0	0	0
Mignon du Preez	10	10	1	174	48	19.33	103.57	0	0	19	2
Tash Farrant	6	4	1	23	11	7.66	104.54	0	0	1	0
Katie George	3	3	1	12	6	6.00	70.58	0	0	0	0
Amelia Kerr	10	8	1	61	26*	8.71	88.40	0	0	5	0
Sara McGlashan	10	9	2	164	55*	23.42	123.30	0	1	15	6
Fi Morris	7	4	0	11	6	2.75	73.33	0	0	1	0
Carla Rudd	9	5	1	8	7	2.00	88.88	0	0	1	0
Paige Scholfield	8	6	2	36	22*	9.00	128.57	0	0	2	2
Danni Wyatt	9	9	0	172	39	19.11	122.85	0	0	23	4
Source: ESPN Cricinfo

=== Bowling ===
Player	Matches	Innings	Overs	Maidens	Runs	Wickets	BBI	Average	Economy	Strike rate
Suzie Bates	10	9	27.3	0	225	9	4/26	25.00	8.18	18.3
Lauren Bell	4	3	11.0	1	67	0	–	–	6.09	–
Arran Brindle	8	7	17.1	0	127	3	1/3	42.33	7.39	34.3
Charlie Dean	5	4	9.0	0	84	0	—	–	9.33	–
Tash Farrant	6	6	22.0	1	171	10	3/16	17.10	7.77	13.2
Katie George	3	3	8.0	0	62	0	–	–	7.75	–
Amelia Kerr	10	9	35.3	0	231	10	2/22	23.10	6.50	21.3
Fi Morris	7	6	20.5	0	167	7	4/22	23.85	8.01	17.8
Paige Scholfield	8	6	11.5	0	98	2	1/25	49.00	8.28	35.5
Danni Wyatt	9	3	4.3	0	33	2	1/4	16.50	7.33	13.5
Source: ESPN Cricinfo

=== Fielding ===
Player	Matches	Innings	Catches
Suzie Bates	10	9	3
Tammy Beaumont	8	6	0
Lauren Bell	4	3	1
Maia Bouchier	4	4	2
Arran Brindle	8	7	0
Charlie Dean	5	5	0
Mignon du Preez	10	9	5
Tash Farrant	6	6	1
Katie George	3	3	2
Amelia Kerr	10	9	2
Sara McGlashan	10	9	3
Fi Morris	7	6	0
Paige Scholfield	8	7	1
Danni Wyatt	9	8	6
Source: ESPN Cricinfo

=== Wicket-keeping ===
Player	Matches	Innings	Catches	Stumpings
Tammy Beaumont	8	1	0	1
Carla Rudd	9	8	2	6
Source: ESPN Cricinfo
