= 2016 Southern Vipers season =

Southern Vipers
2016 season
- Coach: Nicholas Denning
- Captain: Charlotte Edwards
- Overseas player: Suzie Bates; Sara McGlashan; Morna Nielsen
- WCSL: Champions
- Most runs: Suzie Bates (232)
- Most wickets: Suzie Bates (9)
- Most catches: Charlotte Edwards (4); Lydia Greenway (4)
- Most wicket-keeping dismissals: Carla Rudd (4)

The 2016 season was Southern Vipers' first season, in which they competed in the Women's Cricket Super League, a Twenty20 competition. The side finished top of the initial group stage, therefore progressing straight to the final, where they played against Western Storm. They went on to win the final by 7 wickets with 7 balls to spare to become the inaugural winners of the WCSL.

The side represented the South of England, and was partnered with Hampshire County Cricket Club, Sussex County Cricket Club, Berkshire County Cricket Club, Dorset County Cricket Club, Oxfordshire County Cricket Club, Wiltshire County Cricket Club, the Isle of Wight Cricket Board and Southampton Solent University. They played their home matches at the Rose Bowl. Southern Vipers' coach was Nicholas Denning, and they were captained by Charlotte Edwards.

== Squad ==
Southern Vipers announced a 15-player squad on 21 April 2016. Megan Schutt and Daisy Gardner were originally named in the squad, but were both ruled out due to injury and replaced by Morna Nielsen and Linsey Smith, respectively. Age given is at the start of Southern Vipers' first match of the season (31 July 2016).

Name	Nationality	Birth date	Batting Style	Bowling Style	Notes
Batters
Georgia Adams	England	4 October 1993 (aged 22)	Right-handed	Right-arm off break	
Charlotte Edwards	England	17 December 1979 (aged 36)	Right-handed	Right arm leg break	Captain
Lydia Greenway	England	6 August 1985 (aged 30)	Left-handed	Right-arm off break	
All-rounders
Suzie Bates	New Zealand	16 September 1987 (aged 28)	Right-handed	Right-arm medium	Overseas player
Arran Brindle	England	23 November 1981 (aged 34)	Right-handed	Right-arm medium	
Isabelle Collis	England	22 September 1996 (aged 19)	Right-handed	Right-arm leg break	
Alice Macleod	England	14 May 1994 (aged 22)	Right-handed	Right-arm off break	
Fi Morris	England	31 January 1994 (aged 22)	Right-handed	Right-arm off break	
Wicket-keepers
Sara McGlashan	New Zealand	28 March 1982 (aged 34)	Right-handed	—	Overseas player
Carla Rudd	England	30 December 1993 (aged 22)	Right-handed	Right-arm medium	
Bowlers
Ellen Burt	England	20 November 1997 (aged 18)	Right-handed	Right-arm medium	
Tash Farrant	England	29 May 1996 (aged 20)	Left-handed	Left-arm medium	
Katie George	England	7 April 1999 (aged 17)	Right-handed	Left-arm medium	
Morna Nielsen	New Zealand	24 February 1990 (aged 26)	Right-handed	Slow left-arm orthodox	Overseas player
Linsey Smith	England	10 March 1995 (aged 21)	Left-handed	Slow left-arm orthodox	

== Women's Cricket Super League ==
=== Season standings ===
Points table
Pos	Team	Pld	W	L	T	NR	BP	Pts	NRR
1	Southern Vipers	5	4	1	0	0	3	11	1.437
2	Western Storm	5	4	1	0	0	1	9	0.838
3	Loughborough Lightning	5	3	2	0	0	2	8	0.170
4	Surrey Stars	5	2	3	0	0	1	5	−0.274
5	Yorkshire Diamonds	5	1	4	0	0	1	3	−0.362
6	Lancashire Thunder	5	1	4	0	0	0	2	−1.724

Source: ESPN Cricinfo

Advanced to the Final.
Advanced to the Semi-final.

=== League stage ===
31 July
14:00
Scorecard

Surrey Stars; 85/6 (20 overs)	v	Southern Vipers; 88/4 (15.2 overs)
Nat Sciver 36 (44); Tash Farrant 2/17 (4 overs)		Georgia Adams 41 (43); Alex Hartley 2/17 (4 overs)

Southern Vipers won by 6 wickets
Rose Bowl, Southampton
Umpires: Ian Blackwell and Paul Pollard

- Surrey Stars won the toss and elected to bat.
- Points: Southern Vipers 3, Surrey Stars 0

5 August
14:30
Scorecard

Southern Vipers; 132/4 (20 overs)	v	Lancashire Thunder; 121/7 (20 overs)
Sara McGlashan 54 (50); Hayley Matthews 2/16 (4 overs)		Emma Lamb 34 (35); Morna Nielsen 2/16 (4 overs)

Southern Vipers won by 11 runs
Stanley Park, Blackpool
Umpires: Tom Lungley and Paul Pollard

- Southern Vipers won the toss and elected to bat.
- Points: Southern Vipers 2, Lancashire Thunder 0

8 August
14:30
Scorecard

Southern Vipers; 118/4 (20 overs)	v	Yorkshire Diamonds; 64 (16.3 overs)
Suzie Bates 45* (45); Katherine Brunt 2/26 (4 overs)		Beth Mooney 17 (23); Linsey Smith 4/10 (4 overs)

Southern Vipers won by 54 runs
Rose Bowl, Southampton
Umpires: Ben Debenham and Chris Watts

- Southern Vipers won the toss and elected to bat.
- Points: Southern Vipers 3, Yorkshire Diamonds 0

12 August
17:30 (D/N)
Scorecard

Southern Vipers; 137/3 (20 overs)	v	Western Storm; 140/2 (17.5 overs)
Suzie Bates 57 (50); Heather Knight 2/27 (4 overs)		Stafanie Taylor 78* (51); Fi Morris 1/10 (1 over)

Western Storm won by 8 wickets
County Ground, Taunton
Umpires: Ian Blackwell and Tom Lungley

- Southern Vipers won the toss and elected to bat.
- Points: Western Storm 2, Southern Vipers 0

14 August
14:00
Scorecard

Southern Vipers; 156/4 (20 overs)	v	Loughborough Lightning; 97 (18.5 overs)
Suzie Bates 38 (24); Rebecca Grundy 2/24 (4 overs)		Ellyse Perry 35 (33); Linsey Smith 3/16 (4 overs)

Southern Vipers won by 59 runs
Rose Bowl, Southampton
Umpires: Ben Debenham and Tom Lungley

- Southern Vipers won the toss and elected to bat.
- Points: Southern Vipers 3, Loughborough Lightning 0

=== Final ===
21 August
15:00
Scorecard

Western Storm; 140/5 (20 overs)	v	Southern Vipers; 143/3 (18.5 overs)
Rachel Priest 57 (55); Arran Brindle 2/15 (4 overs)		Suzie Bates 52 (46); Jodie Dibble 1/27 (4 overs)

Southern Vipers won by 7 wickets
County Ground, Chelmsford
Umpires: Russell Warren and Chris Watts

- Southern Vipers won the toss and elected to field.

== Statistics ==
=== Batting ===
Player	Matches	Innings	NO	Runs	HS	Average	Strike rate	100s	50s	4s	6s
Georgia Adams	5	4	0	73	41	18.25	87.95	0	0	11	0
Suzie Bates	6	6	1	232	57	46.40	113.17	0	2	28	3
Arran Brindle	5	4	4	91	45*	–	105.81	0	0	8	0
Isabelle Collis	2	2	0	10	9	5.00	76.92	0	0	0	0
Charlotte Edwards	5	4	0	64	30	16.00	94.11	0	0	7	1
Tash Farrant	6	–	–	–	–	–	–	–	–	–	–
Katie George	4	–	–	–	–	–	–	–	–	–	–
Lydia Greenway	6	6	3	81	29	27.00	89.01	0	0	9	0
Alice Macleod	1	1	0	5	5	5.00	71.42	0	0	1	0
Sara McGlashan	6	6	3	134	54*	44.66	97.10	0	1	11	1
Fi Morris	3	–	–	–	–	–	–	–	–	–	–
Morna Nielsen	6	–	–	–	–	–	–	–	–	–	–
Carla Rudd	6	1	1	0	0*	–	–	0	0	0	0
Linsey Smith	5	–	–	–	–	–	–	–	–	–	–
Source: ESPN Cricinfo

=== Bowling ===
Player	Matches	Innings	Overs	Maidens	Runs	Wickets	BBI	Average	Economy	Strike rate
Suzie Bates	6	6	20.2	0	124	9	2/8	13.77	6.09	13.5
Arran Brindle	5	4	14.0	0	83	5	3/24	16.60	5.92	16.8
Tash Farrant	6	6	21.0	1	119	5	2/17	23.80	5.66	25.2
Katie George	4	4	9.0	1	55	1	1/15	55.00	6.11	54.0
Fi Morris	3	3	8.0	0	48	3	1/10	16.00	6.00	16.0
Morna Nielsen	6	6	22.5	1	111	5	2/16	22.20	4.86	27.4
Linsey Smith	5	5	18.0	1	92	8	4/10	11.50	5.11	13.5
Source: ESPN Cricinfo

=== Fielding ===
Player	Matches	Innings	Catches
Georgia Adams	5	5	0
Suzie Bates	6	6	3
Arran Brindle	5	5	3
Isabelle Collis	2	2	0
Charlotte Edwards	5	5	4
Tash Farrant	6	6	1
Katie George	4	4	1
Lydia Greenway	6	6	4
Alice Macleod	1	1	0
Sara McGlashan	6	6	1
Fi Morris	3	3	0
Morna Nielsen	6	6	0
Linsey Smith	5	5	2
Source: ESPN Cricinfo

=== Wicket-keeping ===
Player	Matches	Innings	Catches	Stumpings
Carla Rudd	6	6	0	4
Source: ESPN Cricinfo
