= 2017 Southern Vipers season =

Southern Vipers
2017 season
- Coach: Nicholas Denning
- Captain: Charlotte Edwards
- Overseas player: Suzie Bates; Mignon du Preez; Hayley Matthews
- WCSL: Runners-up
- Most runs: Suzie Bates (260)
- Most wickets: Suzie Bates (8)
- Most catches: Suzie Bates (6)
- Most wicket-keeping dismissals: Carla Rudd (7)

The 2017 season was Southern Vipers' second season, in which they competed in the Women's Cricket Super League, a Twenty20 competition. The side topped the group stage for the second year in a row, therefore progressing to the final. In the final, they faced Western Storm in a repeat of the previous season's final. This time, however, Western Storm were victorious by seven wickets with twelve balls to spare.

The side was captained by Charlotte Edwards and coached by Nicholas Denning. They played two of their home matches at the Rose Bowl and their other home match at the Arundel Castle Cricket Ground.

== Squad ==
Southern Vipers announced a 15-player squad on 26 July 2017. Dane van Niekerk were originally signed as an overseas player, but was ruled out due to injury and replaced by Mignon du Preez. Age given is at the start of Southern Vipers' first match of the season (10 August 2017).

Name	Nationality	Birth date	Batting Style	Bowling Style	Notes
Batters
Georgia Adams	England	4 October 1993 (aged 23)	Right-handed	Right-arm off break	
Mignon du Preez	South Africa	13 June 1989 (aged 28)	Right-handed	Right-arm off break	Overseas player
Charlotte Edwards	England	17 December 1979 (aged 37)	Right-handed	Right arm leg break	Captain
All-rounders
Suzie Bates	New Zealand	16 September 1987 (aged 29)	Right-handed	Right-arm medium	Overseas player
Arran Brindle	England	23 November 1981 (aged 35)	Right-handed	Right-arm medium	
Isabelle Collis	England	22 September 1996 (aged 20)	Right-handed	Right-arm leg break	
Charlie Dean	England	22 December 2000 (aged 16)	Right-handed	Right-arm off break	
Hayley Matthews	West Indies	19 March 1998 (aged 19)	Right-handed	Right-arm off break	Overseas player
Danni Wyatt	England	22 April 1991 (aged 26)	Right-handed	Right-arm off break	
Wicket-keepers
Carla Rudd	England	30 December 1993 (aged 23)	Right-handed	Right-arm medium	
Bowlers
Ellen Burt	England	20 November 1997 (aged 19)	Right-handed	Right-arm medium	
Tash Farrant	England	29 May 1996 (aged 21)	Left-handed	Left-arm medium	
Katie George	England	7 April 1999 (aged 18)	Right-handed	Left-arm medium	
Tara Norris	England	4 June 1998 (aged 19)	Left-handed	Left-arm medium	
Linsey Smith	England	10 March 1995 (aged 22)	Left-handed	Slow left-arm orthodox	

== Women's Cricket Super League ==
=== Season standings ===
Pos	Team	Pld	W	L	T	NR	BP	Pts	NRR
1	Southern Vipers	5	4	1	0	0	4	20	2.001
2	Surrey Stars	5	4	1	0	0	2	18	0.291
3	Western Storm	5	3	2	0	0	0	12	−0.887
4	Loughborough Lightning	5	2	3	0	0	2	10	0.664
5	Yorkshire Diamonds	5	2	3	0	0	0	8	−0.318
6	Lancashire Thunder	5	0	5	0	0	0	0	−1.692

Source: ESPN Cricinfo

Advanced to the Final.
Advanced to the Semi-final.

=== League stage ===
10 August 2017
14:30
Scorecard

Western Storm; 70 (18.5 overs)	v	Southern Vipers; 73/1 (9 overs)
Georgia Hennessy 22 (31); Tash Farrant 2/10 (4 overs)		Suzie Bates 47* (31); Stafanie Taylor 1/3 (2 overs)

Southern Vipers won by 9 wickets
Rose Bowl, Southampton
Umpires: David Millns and Steve O'Shaugnessy
Player of the match: Suzie Bates (Southern Vipers)

- Southern Vipers won the toss and elected to field.
- Points: Southern Vipers 5, Western Storm 0

15 August 2017
14:30
Scorecard

Southern Vipers; 180/2 (20 overs)	v	Loughborough Lightning; 134 (20 overs)
Suzie Bates 119* (72); Lucy Higham 1/29 (4 overs)		Georgia Elwiss 32 (29); Suzie Bates 3/15 (3 overs)

Southern Vipers won by 46 runs
County Ground, Derby
Umpires: Steve O'Shaugnessy and Martin Saggers
Player of the match: Suzie Bates (Southern Vipers)

- Loughborough Lightning won the toss and elected to field.
- Points: Southern Vipers 5, Loughborough Lightning 0

20 August 2017
14:30
Scorecard

Surrey Stars; 127/8 (20 overs)	v	Southern Vipers; 100/7 (16.2 overs)
Marizanne Kapp 42 (48); Hayley Matthews 2/23 (4 overs)		Suzie Bates 50* (41); Nat Sciver 3/28 (3.2 overs)

Surrey Stars won by 4 runs (DLS)
Rose Bowl, Southampton
Umpires: Mark Newell and Russell Warren
Player of the match: Marizanne Kapp (Surrey Stars)

- Surrey Stars won the toss and elected to bat.
- Southern Vipers innings curtailed at 16.2 overs due to rain.
- Southern Vipers' target at 16.2 overs was 105 runs to win.
- Points: Surrey Stars 4, Southern Vipers 0

23 August 2017
14:30
Scorecard

Lancashire Thunder; 87 (20 overs)	v	Southern Vipers; 88/4 (14.5 overs)
Danielle Hazell 37 (39); Linsey Smith 3/16 (4 overs)		Danni Wyatt 46* (29); Sophie Ecclestone 2/19 (4 overs)

Southern Vipers won by 6 wickets
Aigburth Cricket Ground, Liverpool
Umpires: Ben Debenham and Paul Pollard
Player of the match: Danni Wyatt (Southern Vipers)

- Lancashire Thunder won the toss and elected to field.
- Points: Southern Vipers 5, Lancashire Thunder 0

26 August 2017
14:30
Scorecard

Southern Vipers; 138/6 (20 overs)	v	Yorkshire Diamonds; 108 (18.3 overs)
Mignon du Preez 50* (35); Katie Levick 3/21 (4 overs)		Katherine Brunt 42 (30); Arran Brindle 2/13 (4 overs)

Southern Vipers won by 30 runs
Arundel Castle Cricket Ground, Arundel
Umpires: Ian Blackwell and Chris Watts
Player of the match: Mignon du Preez (Southern Vipers)

- Yorkshire Diamonds won the toss and elected to field.
- Points: Southern Vipers 5, Yorkshire Diamonds 0

=== Final ===
1 September
18:00 (D/N)
Scorecard

Southern Vipers; 145/5 (20 overs)	v	Western Storm; 151/3 (18 overs)
Hayley Matthews 31 (28); Stafanie Taylor 3/28 (4 overs)		Rachel Priest 72 (36); Arran Brindle 1/17 (4 overs)

Western Storm won by 7 wickets
County Ground, Hove
Umpires: David Millns and Steve O'Shaughnessy
Player of the match: Rachel Priest (Western Storm)

- Western Storm won the toss and elected to field.

== Statistics ==
=== Batting ===
Player	Matches	Innings	NO	Runs	HS	Average	Strike rate	100s	50s	4s	6s
Georgia Adams	6	6	1	22	12	4.40	61.11	0	0	1	1
Suzie Bates	6	6	3	260	119*	86.66	132.65	1	1	34	7
Arran Brindle	6	4	2	62	19*	31.00	77.50	0	0	5	0
Charlie Dean	1	–	–	–	–	–	–	–	–	–	–
Mignon du Preez	6	4	1	92	50*	30.66	122.66	0	1	11	0
Charlotte Edwards	6	2	1	20	20*	20.00	153.84	0	0	4	0
Tash Farrant	6	2	1	13	12*	13.00	144.44	0	0	1	0
Katie George	4	–	–	–	–	–	–	–	–	–	–
Hayley Matthews	6	6	0	114	40	19.00	91.20	0	0	16	2
Tara Norris	1	–	–	–	–	–	–	–	–	–	–
Carla Rudd	6	1	0	0	0	0.00	0.00	0	0	0	0
Linsey Smith	6	–	–	–	–	–	–	–	–	–	–
Danni Wyatt	6	5	2	92	46*	30.66	124.32	0	0	11	2
Source: ESPN Cricinfo

=== Bowling ===
Player	Matches	Innings	Overs	Maidens	Runs	Wickets	BBI	Average	Economy	Strike rate
Suzie Bates	6	6	17.0	0	95	8	3/15	11.87	5.58	12.7
Arran Brindle	6	6	22.0	0	110	7	2/13	15.71	5.00	18.8
Charlie Dean	1	1	4.0	0	20	1	1/20	20.00	5.00	24.0
Tash Farrant	6	6	20.0	0	123	6	2/10	20.50	6.15	20.0
Katie George	4	3	9.0	0	64	3	1/15	21.33	7.11	18.0
Hayley Matthews	6	6	20.2	2	107	6	2/23	17.83	5.26	20.3
Tara Norris	1	1	3.0	0	18	1	1/18	18.00	6.00	18.0
Linsey Smith	6	5	19.0	0	110	5	3/16	22.00	5.78	22.8
Danni Wyatt	6	1	1.0	0	7	0	–	–	7.00	–
Source: ESPN Cricinfo

=== Fielding ===
Player	Matches	Innings	Catches
Georgia Adams	6	6	0
Suzie Bates	6	6	6
Arran Brindle	6	6	1
Charlie Dean	1	1	1
Mignon du Preez	6	6	1
Charlotte Edwards	6	6	2
Tash Farrant	6	6	0
Katie George	4	4	0
Hayley Matthews	6	6	1
Tara Norris	1	1	0
Linsey Smith	6	6	0
Danni Wyatt	6	6	3
Source: ESPN Cricinfo

=== Wicket-keeping ===
Player	Matches	Innings	Catches	Stumpings
Carla Rudd	6	6	3	4
Source: ESPN Cricinfo
