= 2022 Southern Vipers season =

English cricket season

Southern Vipers
2022 season
- Coach: Charlotte Edwards
- Captain: Georgia Adams
- RHFT: Runners-up
- CEC: Champions
- Most runs: RHFT: Emily Windsor (261); CEC: Danni Wyatt (221)
- Most wickets: RHFT: Tara Norris (12); CEC: Charlie Dean (12)
- Most catches: RHFT: Charlotte Taylor (4); CEC: Maia Bouchier (6)
- Most wicket-keeping dismissals: RHFT: Carla Rudd (7); CEC: Carla Rudd (7)

The 2022 season saw Southern Vipers compete in the 50 over Rachael Heyhoe Flint Trophy, of which they were defending champions, and the Twenty20 Charlotte Edwards Cup. In the Charlotte Edwards Cup, the side went unbeaten through the six group stage matches, therefore qualifying directly for the final. In the final, they beat Central Sparks by 5 wickets with 4.1 overs to spare, therefore claiming their first Charlotte Edwards Cup title.

In the Rachael Heyhoe Flint Trophy, the side finished third in the group, winning five of their seven matches and therefore qualifying for the play-off. They beat South East Stars in the play-off by six wickets, therefore setting up a final against Northern Diamonds, the third such Rachael Heyhoe Flint Trophy final encounter in three years. However, having won the last two finals, this time Vipers lost, by 2 runs.

The side was captained by Georgia Adams and coached by Charlotte Edwards. They played four home matches at the Rose Bowl and three at the County Ground, Hove.

== Squad ==
=== Changes ===
On 29 October 2021, it was announced that Charlie Dean had been awarded a professional contract with the side, having previously been on a temporary contract. On 27 April 2022, it was announced that Anya Shrubsole had signed for the side in a player-coach role, joining from Western Storm. The side announced their 17-player squad for the season on 10 May 2022: joining the team permanently was Nancy Harman from Lightning and Freya Kemp from the Academy, with Chloe Hill joining on loan from Central Sparks for the Charlotte Edwards Cup. Meanwhile, Ella Chandler, Ariana Dowse, Chiara Green, Gemma Lane, Cassidy McCarthy, Sophie Mitchelmore, Finty Trussler and Abbie Whybrow were no longer in the squad. In July 2022, Emily Windsor went on loan to Lightning for the first match of the Rachael Heyhoe Flint Trophy, whilst Chloe Hill's loan was extended to cover the whole of the Rachael Heyhoe Flint Trophy. Ella Chandler, Gemma Lane and Finty Trussler returned to the squad during the Rachael Heyhoe Flint Trophy, with all three players being named in a matchday squad on 16 July. Ariana Dowse later returned to the squad during the Rachael Heyhoe Flint Trophy, first being named in a matchday squad on 23 July. Mary Taylor was first included in a matchday squad on 16 September.

=== Squad list ===
- Age given is at the start of Southern Vipers' first match of the season (14 May 2022).

Name	Nationality	Birth date	Batting Style	Bowling Style	Notes
Batters
Maia Bouchier	England	5 December 1998 (aged 23)	Right-handed	Right-arm medium	
Ella Chandler	England	19 October 2000 (aged 21)	Right-handed	Right-arm medium	Joined July 2022
Ella McCaughan	England	26 September 2002 (aged 19)	Right-handed	Right-arm leg break	
Emily Windsor	England	14 June 1997 (aged 24)	Right-handed	Right-arm medium	One match loan to Lightning in July 2022
All-rounders
Georgia Adams	England	4 October 1993 (aged 28)	Right-handed	Right-arm off break	Captain
Charlie Dean	England	22 December 2000 (aged 21)	Right-handed	Right-arm off break	
Georgia Elwiss	England	31 May 1991 (aged 30)	Right-handed	Right-arm medium	
Freya Kemp	England	21 April 2005 (aged 17)	Left-handed	Left-arm medium	
Alice Monaghan	England	20 March 2000 (aged 22)	Right-handed	Right-arm medium	
Paige Scholfield	England	19 December 1995 (aged 26)	Right-handed	Right-arm fast-medium	
Mary Taylor	England	7 October 2004 (aged 17)	Right-handed	Right-arm medium	Joined September 2022
Danni Wyatt	England	22 April 1991 (aged 31)	Right-handed	Right-arm off break	
Wicket-keepers
Ariana Dowse	England	8 February 2001 (aged 21)	Right-handed	—	Joined July 2022
Chloe Hill	England	3 January 1997 (aged 25)	Right-handed	—	Full season loan from Central Sparks
Carla Rudd	England	30 December 1993 (aged 28)	Right-handed	—	
Bowlers
Lauren Bell	England	2 January 2001 (aged 21)	Right-handed	Right-arm fast-medium	
Nancy Harman	England	11 July 1999 (aged 22)	Right-handed	Right-arm leg break	
Gemma Lane	England	13 May 2003 (aged 19)	Right-handed	Right-arm medium	Joined July 2022
Tara Norris	England	4 June 1998 (aged 23)	Left-handed	Left-arm medium	
Anya Shrubsole	England	7 December 1991 (aged 30)	Right-handed	Right-arm fast-medium	
Charlotte Taylor	England	2 February 1994 (aged 28)	Right-handed	Right-arm off break	
Finty Trussler	England	8 May 2003 (aged 19)	Right-handed	Right-arm leg break	Joined July 2022

== Charlotte Edwards Cup ==
=== Group B ===
Pos	Team	Pld	W	L	T	NR	BP	Pts	NRR
1	Southern Vipers (Q)	6	6	0	0	0	3	27	1.400
2	Northern Diamonds	6	3	3	0	0	2	14	−0.102
3	North West Thunder	6	2	4	0	0	2	10	−0.190
4	Lightning	6	1	5	0	0	0	4	−1.072

Source: England and Wales Cricket Board
- advanced to the final

=== Fixtures ===
14 May 2022
14:30 BST
Scorecard

North West Thunder; 102/7 (20 overs)	v	Southern Vipers; 103/2 (13.3 overs)
Emma Lamb 23 (23); Freya Kemp 2/13 (4 overs)		Maia Bouchier 48* (33); Emma Lamb 1/6 (2 overs)

Southern Vipers won by 8 wickets
County Ground, Hove
Umpires: Sophie McLelland and Surendiran Shanmugam

- North West Thunder won the toss and elected to bat.
- Points: Southern Vipers 5, North West Thunder 0

18 May 2022
18:30 BST (D/N)
Scorecard

Southern Vipers; 155/5 (20 overs)	v	Lightning; 124/8 (20 overs)
Maia Bouchier 41 (34); Marie Kelly 2/17 (3 overs)		Kathryn Bryce 54 (51); Lauren Bell 3/12 (4 overs)

Southern Vipers won by 31 runs
Rose Bowl, Southampton
Umpires: Rob White and Sarah Bartlett

- Lightning won the toss and elected to field.
- Points: Southern Vipers 5, Lightning 0

21 May 2022
14:30 BST
Scorecard

Southern Vipers; 126 (19.3 overs)	v	Northern Diamonds; 115/7 (20 overs)
Danni Wyatt 48 (43); Katie Levick 5/15 (4 overs)		Bess Heath 51 (44); Georgia Adams 2/9 (3 overs)

Southern Vipers won by 11 runs
Riverside Ground, Chester-le-Street
Umpires: Joanne Ibbotson and Naeem Ashraf

- Southern Vipers won the toss and elected to bat.
- Points: Southern Vipers 4, Northern Diamonds 0

29 May 2022
11:00 BST
Scorecard

Lightning; 141 (19.4 overs)	v	Southern Vipers; 142/5 (16.4 overs)
Marie Kelly 36 (12); Georgia Elwiss 3/28 (4 overs)		Danni Wyatt 76 (44); Lucy Higham 3/30 (3 overs)

Southern Vipers won by 5 wickets
Trent Bridge, Nottingham
Umpires: Jasmine Naeem and Russell Warren

- Lightning won the toss and elected to bat.
- Points: Southern Vipers 4, Lightning 0

1 June 2022
19:00 BST (D/N)
Scorecard

North West Thunder; 94/6 (20 overs)	v	Southern Vipers; 97/4 (15.3 overs)
Sophie Ecclestone 28* (32); Charlie Dean 3/16 (4 overs)		Georgia Elwiss 38* (35); Hannah Jones 1/10 (2 overs)

Southern Vipers won by 6 wickets
Old Trafford Cricket Ground, Manchester
Umpires: Joanne Ibbotson and Tim Robinson

- North West Thunder won the toss and elected to bat.
- Points: Southern Vipers 5, North West Thunder 0

4 June 2022
14:30 BST
Scorecard

Northern Diamonds; 141/4 (20 overs)	v	Southern Vipers; 144/4 (18.2 overs)
Nat Sciver 50 (37); Charlie Dean 2/24 (4 overs)		Georgia Adams 47 (41); Leigh Kasperek 2/16 (2 overs)

Southern Vipers won by 6 wickets
Rose Bowl, Southampton
Umpires: Nigel Llong and Sarah Bartlett

- Northern Diamonds won the toss and elected to bat.
- Points: Southern Vipers 4, Northern Diamonds 0

==== Final ====
11 June 2022
16:00 BST
Scorecard

Central Sparks; 109/8 (20 overs)	v	Southern Vipers; 110/4 (15.5 overs)
Amy Jones 27 (23); Charlie Dean 2/19 (4 overs)		Maia Bouchier 32 (25); Emily Arlott 2/28 (4 overs)

Southern Vipers won by 6 wickets
County Ground, Northampton
Umpires: Anna Harris and Sue Redfern
Player of the match: Charlie Dean (Southern Vipers)

- Central Sparks won the toss and elected to bat.

=== Tournament statistics ===
==== Batting ====
Player	Matches	Innings	Runs	Average	High score	100s	50s
Danni Wyatt	6	6	221	36.83	76	0	1
Maia Bouchier	7	7	176	29.33	48*	0	0
Georgia Adams	7	7	145	20.71	47	0	0
Georgia Elwiss	6	6	87	29.00	38*	0	0
Ella McCaughan	5	5	71	35.50	30*	0	0
Freya Kemp	7	5	54	27.00	21*	0	0

Source: ESPN Cricinfo Qualification: 50 runs.

==== Bowling ====
Player	Matches	Overs	Wickets	Average	Economy	BBI	5wi
Charlie Dean	5	20.0	12	8.25	4.95	3/16	0
Freya Kemp	7	26.0	9	17.66	6.11	2/13	0
Georgia Elwiss	6	22.0	8	15.00	5.45	3/28	0
Lauren Bell	6	19.0	5	29.80	7.84	3/12	0

Source: ESPN Cricinfo Qualification: 5 wickets.

== Rachael Heyhoe Flint Trophy ==
=== Season standings ===
Pos	Team	Pld	W	L	T	NR	BP	Pts	NRR
1	Northern Diamonds (Q)	7	6	0	0	1	2	28	0.851
2	South East Stars (Q)	7	5	1	0	1	4	26	0.687
3	Southern Vipers (Q)	7	5	1	0	1	2	24	0.762
4	Western Storm	7	3	3	0	1	1	15	−0.214
5	Central Sparks	7	2	4	0	1	1	11	0.073
6	Lightning	7	2	4	0	1	1	11	−0.630
7	North West Thunder	7	1	5	0	1	0	6	−0.366
8	Sunrisers	7	0	6	0	1	0	2	−1.046

Source: England and Wales Cricket Board

advanced to final advanced to the play-off

=== Fixtures ===
2 July 2022
10:30 BST
Scorecard

Central Sparks; 163/7 (36 overs)	v	Southern Vipers; 75/3 (9.4 overs)
Evelyn Jones 39 (70); Paige Scholfield 2/20 (4 overs)		Danni Wyatt 36* (24); Grace Potts 1/10 (2 overs); Sarah Glenn 1/10 (2 overs)

Southern Vipers won by 7 wickets (DLS)
Edgbaston Foundation Ground, Birmingham
Umpires: Joanne Ibbotson and Tom Lungley

- Southern Vipers won the toss and elected to field.
- Central Sparks innings reduced to 36 overs due to rain.
- Southern Vipers innings reduced to 10 overs due to rain; target was 70.
- Points: Southern Vipers 4, Central Sparks 0

9 July 2022
10:30 BST
Scorecard

Southern Vipers; 306/9 (50 overs)	v	South East Stars; 173 (38.4 overs)
Georgia Elwiss 115 (115); Freya Davies 3/37 (9 overs)		Alice Davidson-Richards 42 (47); Paige Scholfield 3/29 (5.4 overs)

Southern Vipers won by 133 runs
County Ground, Hove
Umpires: Anthony Harris and Sarah Bartlett

- South East Stars won the toss and elected to field.
- Points: Southern Vipers 5, South East Stars 0

16 July 2022
10:30 BST
Scorecard

Southern Vipers; 294/6 (50 overs)	v	Lightning; 228 (44 overs)
Georgia Adams 82 (93); Josie Groves 2/34 (6 overs)		Josie Groves 55 (39); Charlotte Taylor 3/31 (10 overs)

Southern Vipers won by 66 runs
County Ground, Derby
Umpires: Jasmine Naeem and Surendiran Shanmugam

- Southern Vipers won the toss and elected to bat.
- Points: Southern Vipers 5, Lightning 0

23 July 2022
10:30 BST
Scorecard

Southern Vipers; 233/9 (50 overs)	v	Sunrisers; 222/8 (50 overs)
Paige Scholfield 74 (72); Kate Coppack 4/48 (9 overs)		Cordelia Griffith 65 (109); Charlie Dean 3/31 (10 overs)

Southern Vipers won by 11 runs
Rose Bowl, Southampton
Umpires: Billy Taylor and Grace Bambury

- Southern Vipers won the toss and elected to bat.
- Points: Southern Vipers 4, Sunrisers 0

9 September 2022
10:30 BST

Southern Vipers	v	Western Storm

No Result
County Ground, Hove

- The match was postponed due to the death of Queen Elizabeth II, and later deemed a no result with points shared.
- Points: Southern Vipers 2, Western Storm 2

11 September 2022
10:30 BST
Scorecard

North West Thunder; 203 (48.3 overs)	v	Southern Vipers; 204/6 (47 overs)
Eleanor Threlkeld 79 (117); Tara Norris 3/42 (10 overs)		Emily Windsor 59 (75); Phoebe Graham 2/32 (10 overs)

Southern Vipers won by 4 wickets
Rose Bowl, Southampton
Umpires: Alex Wharf and Fiona Richards

- North West Thunder won the toss and elected to bat.
- Points: Southern Vipers 4, North West Thunder 0

17 September 2022
10:30 BST
Scorecard

Southern Vipers; 226/9 (50 overs)	v	Northern Diamonds; 231/6 (43 overs)
Georgia Elwiss 61 (95); Hollie Armitage 3/37 (7 overs)		Lauren Winfield-Hill 125 (125); Georgia Adams 2/37 (10 overs)

Northern Diamonds won by 4 wickets
Headingley Cricket Ground, Leeds
Umpires: Anthony Harris and Sarah Bartlett

- Southern Vipers won the toss and elected to bat.
- Points: Northern Diamonds 4, Southern Vipers 0

==== Play-off ====
21 September 2022
10:30 BST
Scorecard

South East Stars; 139 (42.2 overs)	v	Southern Vipers; 143/4 (34 overs)
Jemima Spence 45* (102); Tara Norris 3/29 (10 overs)		Maia Bouchier 51 (68); Phoebe Franklin 1/14 (5 overs)

Southern Vipers won by 6 wickets
County Ground, Beckenham
Umpires: Jack Shantry and Jasmine Naeem

- South East Stars won the toss and elected to bat.

==== Final ====
25 September 2022
10:30 BST
Scorecard

Northern Diamonds; 215/9 (50 overs)	v	Southern Vipers; 213/9 (50 overs)
Lauren Winfield-Hill 65 (87); Georgia Adams 3/34 (7 overs)		Georgia Adams 70 (96); Linsey Smith 2/24 (10 overs)

Northern Diamonds won by 2 runs
Lord's, London
Umpires: Rob White and Grace Banbury
Player of the match: Lauren Winfield-Hill (Northern Diamonds)

- Southern Vipers won the toss and elected to field.

=== Tournament statistics ===
==== Batting ====
Player	Matches	Innings	Runs	Average	High score	100s	50s
Emily Windsor	7	7	261	65.25	90	0	2
Georgia Adams	8	8	218	27.25	82	0	2
Georgia Elwiss	8	8	202	33.66	115	1	1
Paige Scholfield	8	7	175	25.00	74	0	1
Ella McCaughan	8	7	156	22.28	72	0	1
Maia Bouchier	5	5	128	25.60	51	0	1
Chloe Hill	6	5	111	27.75	55	0	1

Source: ESPN Cricinfo Qualification: 100 runs.

==== Bowling ====
Player	Matches	Overs	Wickets	Average	Economy	BBI	5wi
Tara Norris	8	58.0	12	19.75	4.08	3/29	0
Paige Scholfield	8	46.4	11	20.09	4.73	3/29	0
Georgia Adams	8	59.3	11	24.54	4.53	3/34	0
Charlotte Taylor	8	63.0	9	30.33	4.33	3/31	0
Charlie Dean	4	37.0	5	26.80	3.62	3/31	0

Source: ESPN Cricinfo Qualification: 5 wickets.

== Season statistics ==
=== Batting ===
Player	Rachael Heyhoe Flint Trophy								Charlotte Edwards Cup							
Player	Matches	Innings	Runs	High score	Average	Strike rate	100s	50s	Matches	Innings	Runs	High score	Average	Strike rate	100s	50s
Georgia Adams	8	8	218	82	27.25	70.32	0	2	7	7	145	47	20.71	104.31	0	0
Lauren Bell	2	2	22	17	11.00	129.41	0	0	6	1	7	7	7.00	140.00	0	0
Maia Bouchier	5	5	128	51	25.60	71.50	0	1	7	7	176	48*	29.33	118.91	0	0
Charlie Dean	4	3	49	32	16.33	60.49	0	0	5	3	27	20*	27.00	65.85	0	0
Georgia Elwiss	8	8	202	115	33.66	77.09	1	1	6	6	87	38*	29.00	100.00	0	0
Nancy Harman	3	3	42	23*	42.00	107.69	0	0	4	1	2	2	2.00	50.00	0	0
Chloe Hill	6	5	111	55	27.75	56.34	0	1	–	–	–	–	–	–	–	–
Freya Kemp	2	2	46	40	23.00	158.62	0	0	7	5	54	21*	27.00	114.89	0	0
Ella McCaughan	8	7	156	72	22.28	59.09	0	1	5	5	71	30*	35.50	97.26	0	0
Alice Monaghan	3	1	0	0	0.00	0.00	0	0	–	–	–	–	–	–	–	–
Tara Norris	8	6	64	21	16.00	65.30	0	0	4	1	0	0	0.00	0.00	0	0
Carla Rudd	4	1	8	8*	–	200.00	0	0	7	1	4	4*	–	66.66	0	0
Paige Scholfield	8	7	175	74	25.00	77.09	0	1	7	3	7	3	2.33	38.88	0	0
Anya Shrubsole	–	–	–	–	–	–	–	–	6	1	1	1	1.00	25.00	0	0
Charlotte Taylor	8	3	14	11	14.00	48.27	0	0	–	–	–	–	–	–	–	–
Mary Taylor	1	–	–	–	–	–	–	–	–	–	–	–	–	–	–	–
Finty Trussler	2	1	2	2*	–	100.00	0	0	–	–	–	–	–	–	–	–
Emily Windsor	7	7	261	90	65.25	90.00	0	2	–	–	–	–	–	–	–	–
Danni Wyatt	1	1	36	36*	–	150.00	0	0	6	6	221	76	36.83	152.41	0	1
Source: ESPN Cricinfo

=== Bowling ===
Player	Rachael Heyhoe Flint Trophy							Charlotte Edwards Cup						
Player	Matches	Overs	Wickets	Average	Economy	BBI	5wi	Matches	Overs	Wickets	Average	Economy	BBI	5wi
Georgia Adams	8	59.3	11	24.54	4.53	3/34	0	7	14.0	4	15.25	4.35	2/9	0
Lauren Bell	2	18.0	1	71.00	3.94	1/29	0	6	19.0	5	29.80	7.84	3/12	0
Charlie Dean	4	37.0	5	26.80	3.62	3/31	0	5	20.0	12	8.25	4.95	3/16	0
Georgia Elwiss	8	31.0	4	33.75	4.35	2/50	0	6	22.0	8	15.00	5.45	3/28	0
Nancy Harman	3	9.0	3	18.33	6.11	2/47	0	4	7.0	1	44.00	6.28	1/13	0
Freya Kemp	2	8.0	1	32.00	4.00	1/16	0	7	26.0	9	17.66	6.11	2/13	0
Alice Monaghan	3	1.0	0	–	19.00	–	0	–	–	–	–	–	–	–
Tara Norris	8	58.0	12	19.75	4.08	3/29	0	4	9.4	2	27.00	5.58	1/15	0
Paige Scholfield	8	46.4	11	20.09	4.73	3/29	0	7	1.0	0	–	3.00	–	0
Anya Shrubsole	–	–	–	–	–	–	–	6	21.0	4	28.50	5.42	2/23	0
Charlotte Taylor	8	63.0	9	30.33	4.33	3/31	0	–	–	–	–	–	–	–
Mary Taylor	1	5.0	2	11.00	4.40	2/22	0	–	–	–	–	–	–	–
Finty Trussler	2	16.2	4	17.00	4.16	2/12	0	–	–	–	–	–	–	–
Source: ESPN Cricinfo

=== Fielding ===
Player	Rachael Heyhoe Flint Trophy			Charlotte Edwards Cup		
Player	Matches	Innings	Catches	Matches	Innings	Catches
Georgia Adams	8	8	2	7	7	5
Lauren Bell	2	2	0	6	6	1
Maia Bouchier	5	5	2	7	7	6
Charlie Dean	4	4	2	5	5	1
Georgia Elwiss	8	8	2	6	6	0
Nancy Harman	3	3	0	4	4	0
Chloe Hill	6	2	0	–	–	–
Freya Kemp	2	2	1	7	7	2
Ella McCaughan	8	8	2	5	5	1
Alice Monaghan	3	3	2	–	–	–
Tara Norris	8	8	2	4	4	0
Paige Scholfield	8	8	3	7	7	4
Anya Shrubsole	–	–	–	6	6	1
Charlotte Taylor	8	8	4	–	–	–
Mary Taylor	1	1	0	–	–	–
Finty Trussler	2	2	0	–	–	–
Emily Windsor	7	7	0	–	–	–
Danni Wyatt	1	1	0	6	6	1
Source: ESPN Cricinfo

=== Wicket-keeping ===
Player	Rachael Heyhoe Flint Trophy				Charlotte Edwards Cup			
Player	Matches	Innings	Catches	Stumpings	Matches	Innings	Catches	Stumpings
Chloe Hill	6	4	2	1	–	–	–	–
Carla Rudd	4	4	5	2	7	7	5	2
Source: ESPN Cricinfo
