= 2019 Southern Vipers season =

Southern Vipers
2019 season
- Coach: Nicholas Denning
- Captain: Tammy Beaumont
- Overseas player: Suzie Bates; Stafanie Taylor; Amanda-Jade Wellington
- WCSL: Runners-up
- Most runs: Danni Wyatt (466)
- Most wickets: Amanda-Jade Wellington (15)
- Most catches: Suzie Bates (6); Danni Wyatt (6)
- Most wicket-keeping dismissals: Carla Rudd (5)

The 2019 season was Southern Vipers' fourth season, in which they competed in the final edition of the Women's Cricket Super League, a Twenty20 competition. The side finished third in the initial group stage, winning 4 of their 10 matches, therefore progressing to the semi-final, where they beat Loughborough Lightning by 5 wickets. In the final they played against Western Storm, but lost to them by 7 wickets.

The side was captained by Tammy Beaumont and coached by Nicholas Denning. They played three home matches at the Rose Bowl and one home match apiece at the Arundel Castle Cricket Ground and the County Ground, Hove.

== Squad ==
Southern Vipers announced a 15-player squad on 16 July 2019. Sophie Molineux was originally named in the squad, but withdrew due to injury and replaced by Amanda-Jade Wellington. Age given is at the start of Southern Vipers' first match of the season (6 August 2019).

Name	Nationality	Birth date	Batting Style	Bowling Style	Notes
Batters
Maia Bouchier	England	5 December 1998 (aged 20)	Right-handed	Right-arm medium	
Marie Kelly	England	9 February 1996 (aged 23)	Right-handed	Right-arm medium	
All-rounders
Suzie Bates	New Zealand	16 September 1987 (aged 31)	Right-handed	Right-arm medium	Overseas player
Thea Brookes	England	15 February 1993 (aged 26)	Right-handed	Right-arm off break	
Charlie Dean	England	22 December 2000 (aged 18)	Right-handed	Right-arm off break	
Fi Morris	England	31 January 1994 (aged 25)	Right-handed	Right-arm off break	
Paige Scholfield	England	19 December 1995 (aged 23)	Right-handed	Right-arm medium	
Stafanie Taylor	West Indies	11 June 1991 (aged 28)	Right-handed	Right-arm off break	Overseas player
Danni Wyatt	England	22 April 1991 (aged 28)	Right-handed	Right-arm off break	
Wicket-keepers
Tammy Beaumont	England	11 March 1991 (aged 28)	Right-handed	—	Captain
Carla Rudd	England	30 December 1993 (aged 25)	Right-handed	Right-arm medium	
Bowlers
Lauren Bell	England	2 January 2001 (aged 18)	Right-handed	Right-arm medium	
Tash Farrant	England	29 May 1996 (aged 23)	Left-handed	Left-arm medium	
Amanda-Jade Wellington	Australia	29 May 1997 (aged 22)	Right-handed	Right-arm leg break	Overseas player
Issy Wong	England	15 May 2002 (aged 17)	Right-handed	Right-arm medium	

=== Season standings ===
Pos	Team	Pld	W	L	T	NR	BP	Pts	NRR
1	Western Storm	10	9	1	0	0	3	39	1.109
2	Loughborough Lightning	10	7	3	0	0	4	32	0.792
3	Southern Vipers	10	4	4	1	1	2	22	0.425
4	Yorkshire Diamonds	10	5	5	0	0	0	20	−0.456
5	Surrey Stars	10	3	6	0	1	2	16	−0.857
6	Lancashire Thunder	10	0	9	1	0	0	2	−1.194

Source: ESPN Cricinfo

Advanced to the Final.
Advanced to the Semi-final.

=== League stage ===
6 August 2019
14:30
Scorecard

Southern Vipers; 166/7 (20 overs)	v	Lancashire Thunder; 132 (19.4 overs)
Danni Wyatt 54 (39); Alex Hartley 2/34 (4 overs)		Georgie Boyce 43 (41); Tash Farrant 3/18 (4 overs)

Southern Vipers won by 34 runs
Aigburth Cricket Ground, Liverpool
Umpires: Sue Redfern and Neil Pratt
Player of the match: Danni Wyatt (Southern Vipers)

- Southern Vipers won the toss and elected to bat.
- Points: Southern Vipers 5, Lancashire Thunder 0

8 August 2019
16:00
Scorecard

Loughborough Lightning; 135/5 (20 overs)	v	Southern Vipers; 136/8 (19.3 overs)
Georgia Elwiss 37 (31); Paige Scholfield 1/12 (2 overs)		Danni Wyatt 40 (33); Kirstie Gordon 2/24 (4 overs)

Southern Vipers won by 2 wickets
Haslegrave Ground, Loughborough
Umpires: James Middlebrook and Sue Redfern
Player of the match: Stafanie Taylor (Southern Vipers)

- Loughborough Lightning won the toss and elected to bat.
- Points: Southern Vipers 4, Loughborough Lightning 0

11 August 2019
14:30
Scorecard

Southern Vipers; 142/5 (20 overs)	v	Western Storm; 143/7 (19.5 overs)
Stafanie Taylor 44* (28); Claire Nicholas 2/29 (4 overs)		Fran Wilson 40 (30); Tash Farrant 3/23 (4 overs)

Western Storm won by 3 wickets
Rose Bowl, Southampton
Umpires: James Middlebrook and Chris Watts
Player of the match: Fran Wilson (Western Storm)

- Southern Vipers won the toss and elected to bat.
- Points: Western Storm 4, Southern Vipers 0

12 August 2019
18:30
Scorecard

Surrey Stars	v	Southern Vipers

Match Abandoned
The Oval, London
Umpires: Peter Hartley and Jeremy Lloyds

- No toss.
- No play possible due to rain.
- Points: Surrey Stars 2, Southern Vipers 2

15 August 2019
19:00
Scorecard

Lancashire Thunder; 132/7 (20 overs)	v	Southern Vipers; 132/8 (20 overs)
Harmanpreet Kaur 34 (33); Amanda-Jade Wellington 3/22 (4 overs)		Stafanie Taylor 51 (43); Emma Lamb 3/33 (4 overs)

Match Tied
County Ground, Hove
Umpires: Mark Newell and Mary Waldron
Player of the match: Stafanie Taylor (Southern Vipers)

- Lancashire Thunder won the toss and elected to bat.
- Points: Southern Vipers 2, Lancashire Thunder 2

18 August 2019
14:30
Scorecard

Southern Vipers; 178/5 (20 overs)	v	Surrey Stars; 89 (16.4 overs)
Danni Wyatt 110 (60); Dane van Niekerk 3/31 (4 overs)		Sarah Taylor 19 (20); Stafanie Taylor 3/11 (3 overs)

Southern Vipers won by 89 runs
Arundel Castle Cricket Ground, Arundel
Umpires: Rob White and Mary Waldron
Player of the match: Danni Wyatt (Southern Vipers)

- Surrey Stars won the toss and elected to field.
- Points: Southern Vipers 5, Surrey Stars 0

20 August 2019
14:30
Scorecard

Western Storm; 170/3 (20 overs)	v	Southern Vipers; 155/9 (20 overs)
Heather Knight 61 (48); Stafanie Taylor 1/20 (4 overs)		Danni Wyatt 56 (32); Freya Davies 4/18 (4 overs)

Western Storm won by 15 runs
County Ground, Bristol
Umpires: Ian Ramage and Sue Redfern
Player of the match: Freya Davies (Western Storm)

- Western Storm won the toss and elected to bat.
- Points: Western Storm 4, Southern Vipers 0

21 August 2019
18:30
Scorecard

Southern Vipers; 127/9 (20 overs)	v	Yorkshire Diamonds; 124/5 (20 overs)
Danni Wyatt 59 (30); Leigh Kasperek 4/16 (4 overs)		Hollie Armitage 34 (38); Suzie Bates 2/27 (4 overs)

Southern Vipers won by 3 runs
Rose Bowl, Southampton
Umpires: Neil Bainton and Alex Wharf
Player of the match: Danni Wyatt (Southern Vipers)

- Southern Vipers won the toss and elected to bat.
- Points: Southern Vipers 4, Yorkshire Diamonds 0

25 August 2019
14:30
Scorecard

Southern Vipers; 184/4 (20 overs)	v	Yorkshire Diamonds; 185/6 (20 overs)
Suzie Bates 47 (39); Alice Davidson-Richards 3/21 (4 overs)		Jemimah Rodrigues 112* (58); Tash Farrant 2/27 (4 overs)

Yorkshire Diamonds won by 4 wickets
Clifton Park Ground, York
Umpires: Hassan Adnan and James Middlebrook
Player of the match: Jemimah Rodrigues (Yorkshire Diamonds)

- Yorkshire Diamonds won the toss and elected to field.
- Points: Yorkshire Diamonds 4, Southern Vipers 0

28 August 2019
18:30
Scorecard

Loughborough Lightning; 163/4 (20 overs)	v	Southern Vipers; 127 (19 overs)
Amy Jones 74 (53); Amanda-Jade Wellington 2/22 (4 overs)		Fi Morris 36 (31); Chamari Atapattu 3/18 (4 overs)

Loughborough Lightning won by 36 runs
Rose Bowl, Southampton
Umpires: James Middlebrook and Rob White
Player of the match: Amy Jones (Loughborough Lightning)

- Southern Vipers won the toss and elected to field.
- Points: Loughborough Lightning 5, Southern Vipers 0

=== Semi-final ===
1 September 2019
12:00
Scorecard

Loughborough Lightning; 143 (19.5 overs)	v	Southern Vipers; 145/5 (19 overs)
Georgia Elwiss 28 (22); Suzie Bates 3/22 (2.5 overs)		Suzie Bates 37 (25); Georgia Elwiss 1/21 (4 overs)

Southern Vipers won by 5 wickets
County Ground, Hove
Umpires: Mark Newell and Rob White
Player of the match: Suzie Bates (Southern Vipers)

- Loughborough Lightning won the toss and elected to bat.

=== Final ===
1 September 2019
16:00
Scorecard

Southern Vipers; 172/7 (20 overs)	v	Western Storm; 174/4 (19 overs)
Danni Wyatt 73 (42); Anya Shrubsole 2/26 (4 overs)		Heather Knight 78* (53); Amanda-Jade Wellington 2/31 (4 overs)

Western Storm won by 6 wickets
County Ground, Hove
Umpires: Mark Newell and Rob White
Player of the match: Heather Knight (Western Storm)

- Southern Vipers won the toss and elected to bat.

== Statistics ==
=== Batting ===
Player	Matches	Innings	NO	Runs	HS	Average	Strike rate	100s	50s	4s	6s
Suzie Bates	11	11	0	246	47	22.36	99.19	0	0	32	2
Tammy Beaumont	11	11	1	239	53	23.90	110.64	0	1	21	9
Lauren Bell	9	–	–	–	–	–	–	–	–	–	–
Maia Bouchier	11	11	2	114	40	12.66	104.58	0	0	8	2
Thea Brookes	7	7	0	43	17	6.14	65.15	0	0	5	1
Charlie Dean	1	–	–	–	–	–	–	–	–	–	–
Tash Farrant	10	5	1	10	6	2.50	66.66	0	0	1	0
Marie Kelly	5	4	1	13	5	4.33	72.22	0	0	1	0
Fi Morris	8	6	2	73	36	18.25	97.33	0	0	6	1
Carla Rudd	7	4	4	15	8*	–	136.36	0	0	1	0
Paige Scholfield	10	8	2	58	24	9.66	105.45	0	0	5	1
Stafanie Taylor	6	6	1	205	51	41.00	134.86	0	1	23	4
Amanda-Jade Wellington	11	9	3	88	24*	14.66	146.66	0	0	13	1
Issy Wong	3	2	1	3	3	3.00	100.00	0	0	0	0
Danni Wyatt	11	11	0	466	110	42.36	166.42	1	4	61	18
Source: ESPN Cricinfo

=== Bowling ===
Player	Matches	Innings	Overs	Maidens	Runs	Wickets	BBI	Average	Economy	Strike rate
Suzie Bates	11	11	33.4	0	280	8	3/22	35.00	8.31	25.2
Lauren Bell	9	9	31.0	0	237	8	2/19	29.62	7.64	23.2
Charlie Dean	1	1	1.0	0	11	0	–	–	11.00	–
Tash Farrant	10	10	33.4	0	223	14	3/18	15.92	6.62	14.4
Fi Morris	8	8	20.0	0	143	5	2/13	28.60	7.15	24.0
Paige Scholfield	10	4	4.4	0	27	2	1/1	13.50	5.78	14.0
Stafanie Taylor	6	6	23.0	0	144	8	3/11	18.00	6.26	17.2
Amanda-Jade Wellington	11	11	41.0	0	281	15	3/22	18.73	6.85	16.4
Issy Wong	3	3	8.0	0	65	1	1/25	65.00	8.12	48.0
Danni Wyatt	11	9	19.0	0	145	2	2/14	72.50	7.63	57.0
Source: ESPN Cricinfo

=== Fielding ===
Player	Matches	Innings	Catches
Suzie Bates	11	11	6
Tammy Beaumont	11	7	2
Lauren Bell	9	9	3
Maia Bouchier	11	11	2
Thea Brookes	7	7	0
Charlie Dean	1	1	0
Tash Farrant	10	10	0
Marie Kelly	5	5	1
Fi Morris	8	8	3
Paige Scholfield	10	10	3
Stafanie Taylor	6	6	0
Amanda-Jade Wellington	11	11	3
Issy Wong	3	3	0
Danni Wyatt	11	11	6
Source: ESPN Cricinfo

=== Wicket-keeping ===
Player	Matches	Innings	Catches	Stumpings
Tammy Beaumont	11	4	1	1
Carla Rudd	7	7	2	3
Source: ESPN Cricinfo
