= Farrant =

Farrant is an English surname. Notable people with the surname include:

- Daniel Farrant (1575–1651), English composer, viol player and instrument maker
- Danny Farrant (born 1947), English drummer
- David Farrant (born 1960), New Zealand cricketer
- Anthony Farrant (1955–2013), New Zealand cricketer
- David Farrant, psychic investigator in the Highgate Vampire case
- Gary Farrant (born 1946), Australian football player
- John Farrant, (perhaps more than one) sixteenth century organist in Salisbury Cathedral and Ely Cathedral
- M. A. C. Farrant (born 1947), Canadian short fiction writer, memoirist, journalist, and humourist
- Natasha Farrant (author), British author
- Otto Farrant (born 1996), British actor
- Paul Farrant, British slalom canoer
- Percy Farrant (1868–1921), Welsh cricketer and educator
- Richard Farrant (c. 1525–1580), English composer of church music
- Samuel Farrant, English footballer
- Tash Farrant (born 1996), English cricketer
- Trevor Duguid Farrant (born 1966), Cornish author and statistician
- Walt Farrant (1912–1977), Canadian ice hockey player

== Given name ==
- Farrant Reed (1865–1911), English cricketer
