= Paul Farrant =

British canoeist

Personal information
- Born: 1935 birth registered in Uxbridge, Middlesex, England
- Died: 17 April 1960 Westminster Hospital, Westminster, London, England

Sport
- Sport: Kayaking
- Event: Folding kayak
Medal record
Men's slalom canoeing
Representing Great Britain
World Championships
Gold medal – first place	1959 Geneva	Folding K-1

Paul Farrant (1935 – 17 April 1960) was a British slalom canoeist who competed in the mid-to-late 1950s. He won a gold medal in the folding K-1 event at the 1959 ICF Canoe Slalom World Championships in Geneva.

Farrant worked as a carpenter. Between 1957 and 1960, he was chairman of the Chalfont Park Canoe Club, of which he was a founder member.

Farrant died at Westminster Hospital on 17 April 1960, a day after he was injured in a road accident.
