= Samuel Farrant =

English footballer

Personal information
- Full name: Samuel George Farrant
- Date of birth: 27 May 1885
- Place of birth: Wellington, England
- Position: Inside right

Senior career*
Years	Team	Apps	(Gls)
- Bristol St George
- Grays United
1904	Bristol City	0	(0)
1905–1906	Stockport County	2	(0)
- Workington
1907–1908	Luton Town	3	(0)
1908–1909	Coventry City	14	(3)
- Aberdare Town
- Bath City
- * Club domestic league appearances and goals

Samuel George Farrant was an English professional footballer who played in the Football League for Stockport County as an inside right.

== Personal life ==
Prior to the First World War, Farrant served in the Devonshire Regiment. He served as a driver in the Royal Canadian Army Service Corps during the war. Farrant later emigrated to South Africa.

== Career statistics ==
Appearances and goals by club, season and competition
Club	Season	League			FA Cup		Total	
Club	Season	Division	Apps	Goals	Apps	Goals	Apps	Goals
Stockport County	1905–06	Second Division	2	0	0	0	2	0
Luton Town	1907–08	Southern League First Division	3	0	0	0	3	0
Coventry City	1908–09	Southern League First Division	14	3	0	0	14	3
Career total			19	3	0	0	19	3
