= David Farrant =

New Zealand cricketer (born 1960)

Personal information
- Full name: David Graeme Farrant
- Born: 1 August 1960 (age 66); Fairlie, Canterbury, New Zealand
- Batting: Right-handed
- Bowling: Right-arm medium-pace

Career statistics
Competition	FC	LA
Matches	4	2
Runs scored	84	25
Batting average	14	12.5
100s/50s	0/0	0/0
Top score	33	17
Balls bowled	424	54
Wickets	4	2
Bowling average	221	20.0
5 wickets in innings	0	0
10 wickets in match	0	0
Best bowling	1/7	2/31
Catches/stumpings	1/0	0/0
- Source: David Farrant at Cricinfo, 17 October 2017

David Graeme Farrant (born 1 August 1960) is a former New Zealand first-class cricketer who played for Canterbury in the 1980s. He is the younger brother of Anthony Farrant.

Farrant was on the New Zealand under-20s (Brabin) cricket team in 1979–1980. His son, Matthew Farrant, is also a cricketer and played for Canterbury at the under-19 level.
