= Tony Farrant =

New Zealand cricketer (1955–2013)

Anthony John Farrant (20 June 1955 in Fairlie – 9 March 2013 in Australia) was a New Zealand cricketer who played for Canterbury in the Plunket Shield.

Farrant was an accurate right-arm medium-pace bowler who moved the ball through the air and off the pitch. His younger brother David also played for Canterbury.
