= Charlotte Taylor (cricketer) =

English cricketer

Personal information
- Full name: Charlotte Michelle Taylor
- Born: 2 February 1994 (age 32); New Milton, Hampshire, England
- Batting: Right-handed
- Bowling: Right-arm off break
- Role: Bowler

Domestic team information
- Years: Team
- 2010–2024: Hampshire
- 2020–2023: Southern Vipers
- 2021: Southern Brave

Career statistics
Competition	WLA	WT20
Matches	70	61
Runs scored	1,100	768
Batting average	25.00	17.86
100s/50s	1/2	0/2
Top score	165*	76
Balls bowled	2,677	977
Wickets	69	41
Bowling average	22.14	22.34
5 wickets in innings	1	0
10 wickets in match	0	0
Best bowling	6/34	4/9
Catches/stumpings	13/–	15/–
- Source: CricketArchive, 19 October 2023

Charlotte Michelle Taylor (born 2 February 1994) is an English cricketer who has played for Hampshire, Southern Vipers and Southern Brave. Taylor is an off spin bowler, and was the top wicket taker at the 2020 Rachael Heyhoe Flint Trophy.

== Personal life ==
Taylor is from New Milton, Hampshire, England, and went to The Arnewood School. She now lives in Southampton, near to the Rose Bowl cricket ground, and works in customer services for an aerospace company. Her uncle Neil played minor counties cricket, and her father is the current chairman of New Milton Cricket Club. Both of them have played club cricket for New Milton Cricket Club.

== Career ==
Taylor started playing cricket for New Milton under-9s, and later joined Hursley Ladies cricket team. In 2010, she started playing for Hampshire as a batter. In 2015, Taylor was part of the Hampshire side that were promoted from Division 3 to Division 2 of the Women's County Championship. In the same year, Taylor played club cricket for Fernhill Cricket Club, taking 15 wickets in the season. In 2017, Taylor suffered a cruciate ligament tear, which meant she was unable to play for two years. After her injury, Taylor focused on her bowling. She is now an off spinner who bowls mainly arm balls.

In 2020, Taylor was called up to the Southern Vipers squad for the Rachael Heyhoe Flint Trophy, as an injury replacement. After testing negative for COVID-19, Taylor was initially asked to commentate for BBC Radio Solent on the Vipers match against the South East Stars. Instead, Taylor was selected to play in the match, where she took 2/13 from seven overs. In a later match against Western Storm, she took 4/41. In the Rachael Heyhoe Flint Trophy final against Northern Diamonds, Taylor took 6 wickets for 34 runs, as Vipers won the match and the tournament. She was awarded the player of the match award in the final, and her bowling figures were the best of any player in the Rachael Heyhoe Flint Trophy. In total, Taylor played five matches in the competition, taking 15 wickets, more than any other player. Her bowling average was just above 10, and her strike rate was 18 balls per wicket. Taylor was included in the Vipers squad for the 2021 season, and was signed by Southern Brave for the inaugural season of The Hundred. She played for them in three matches but only managed to get one wicket. In the 2021 Rachael Heyhoe Flint Trophy, she took 13 wickets, the most of any Vipers player, at an average of 18.15. She took 9 wickets for Southern Vipers in the 2022 Rachael Heyhoe Flint Trophy, at an average of 30.33. In April 2023, it was announced that Taylor had signed a six-month professional contract for the first time with Southern Vipers. She played one match for the side in 2023. Taylor left Hampshire at the end of the 2024 season.
