= Isabelle Collis =

English cricketer

Personal information
- Full name: Isabelle Victoria Collis
- Born: 22 September 1996 (age 30); Oxford, England
- Batting: Right-handed
- Bowling: Right-arm leg break
- Role: Batter

Domestic team information
- Years: Team
- 2010: Berkshire
- 2011–present: Sussex
- 2018: → Hampshire (on loan)
- 2016–2017: Southern Vipers

Career statistics
Competition	WLA	WT20
Matches	42	44
Runs scored	608	502
Batting average	18.42	18.59
100s/50s	0/3	0/2
Top score	67	60*
Balls bowled	72	–
Wickets	3	–
Bowling average	22.00	–
5 wickets in innings	0	–
10 wickets in match	0	–
Best bowling	3/19	–
Catches/stumpings	11/–	4/–
- Source: CricketArchive, 23 October 2023

Isabelle Victoria Collis (born 22 September 1996) is an English cricketer who currently plays for Sussex. She plays as a right-handed batter. She has previously played for Berkshire and Hampshire, as well as Southern Vipers in the Women's Cricket Super League.

== Early life ==
Collis was born on 22 September 1996 in Oxford.

== Domestic career ==
Collis made her county debut in 2010, for Berkshire against Nottinghamshire. In 2011, she began playing for Sussex, and helped them to the County Championship title in 2013, the same season in which she made her maiden county half-century, scoring 51* against Yorkshire. In 2015, she was Sussex's second-highest run-scorer in the County Championship, with 184 runs at an average of 36.80, as well as helping her side win the 2015 Women's Twenty20 Cup.

In 2018, Collis played three matches for Hampshire in their Division 1 winning Championship season. She played the rest of the season for Sussex, and was their second-highest run-scorer in the Twenty20 Cup, with 130 runs at an average of 32.50. In 2019, Collis hit 110 runs in the County Championship, including her List A high score of 67. She played two matches for the side in the 2021 Women's Twenty20 Cup, scoring 60 runs, as well as playing two matches in the 2021 Women's London Championship, scoring 39 runs. She played seven matches in the 2022 Women's Twenty20 Cup, scoring 56 runs.

Collis was also in the Southern Vipers squad in the Women's Cricket Super League in 2016 and 2017. She only appeared for the side in 2016, playing two matches and scoring 10 runs.
