= Ariana Dowse =

English cricketer

Personal information
- Full name: Ariana Dowse
- Born: 8 February 2001 (age 25); Eastbourne, East Sussex, England
- Batting: Right-handed
- Role: Wicket-keeper

Domestic team information
- Years: Team
- 2017: Sussex
- 2018–2022: Hampshire
- 2020–2022: Southern Vipers
- 2023–present: Berkshire
- 2023–2024: Sunrisers

Career statistics
Competition	WLA	WT20
Matches	27	34
Runs scored	227	147
Batting average	11.94	8.64
100s/50s	1/0	0/0
Top score	105	37
Catches/stumpings	11/7	14/12
- Source: CricketArchive, 19 October 2024

Ariana Dowse (born 8 February 2001) is an English cricketer who currently plays for Berkshire. She plays as a wicket-keeper and right-handed batter. She previously played for Sussex, Hampshire and Sunrisers.

== Early life ==
Dowse was born on 8 February 2001 in Eastbourne, East Sussex, and attended Bede's School and Solent University.

== Domestic career ==
Dowse made her county debut in 2017, for Sussex against Nottinghamshire. She went on to play nine matches overall for the side that season. She moved to Hampshire ahead of the 2018 season, and won the Women's County Championship in her first season with the side. She went on to play for the side until the end of the 2022 season. She joined Berkshire in 2023, and scored a century on debut for the side in the Women's London Championship, 118 against Sussex.

Dowse was included in the Southern Vipers squad between 2020 and 2022, but did not play a match for the side. In 2023, she began training with Sunrisers, and signed a contract with the side in September 2023. She made her debut for the side on 5 September 2023, against Western Storm in the Rachael Heyhoe Flint Trophy. In her third match for the side, she scored her maiden List A century, with 105 against The Blaze. In 2024, she played four matches for Sunrisers, all in the Rachael Heyhoe Flint Trophy.

Dowse played for Tornadoes during the April 2023 edition of the FairBreak Invitational T20, playing six matches and making four dismissals.
