= Emily Windsor =

English cricketer

Personal information
- Full name: Emily Lauren Windsor
- Born: 14 June 1997 (age 29); Portsmouth, England
- Batting: Right-handed
- Bowling: Right-arm medium
- Role: Batter

Domestic team information
- Years: Team
- 2013–2024: Hampshire
- 2018: Southern Vipers
- 2020–2024: Southern Vipers
- 2022: → Lightning (on loan)
- 2021: Trent Rockets
- 2022: Oval Invincibles
- 2023–present: Welsh Fire

Career statistics
Competition	WLA	WT20
Matches	91	95
Runs scored	1,751	1,023
Batting average	25.37	20.87
100s/50s	0/9	0/4
Top score	99	85
Balls bowled	653	252
Wickets	27	17
Bowling average	16.81	15.41
5 wickets in innings	1	0
10 wickets in match	0	0
Best bowling	6/23	2/9
Catches/stumpings	12/–	27/–
- Source: CricketArchive, 18 October 2024

Emily Lauren Windsor (born 14 June 1997) is an English cricketer who currently plays for Durham and Welsh Fire. She primarily plays as a right-handed batter, whilst also bowling right-arm medium. She has previously played for Hampshire, Southern Vipers, Lightning, Trent Rockets and Oval Invincibles.

== Early life ==
Windsor was born on 14 June 1997 in Portsmouth. Aside from her cricket career, she is also part of BBC Radio Solent's and BBC Radio Sports Extra cricket commentary team.

== Domestic career ==
Windsor made her county debut in 2013, for Hampshire against Northamptonshire. In 2014, she hit her first two county half-centuries in the County Championship, and scored 133 runs overall. In 2015, Windsor made both her List A high score and best bowling figures in the same match, scoring 99 and taking 6/23 against Northamptonshire. In 2017, she was Hampshire's leading run-scorer in the Twenty20 Cup, with 193 runs, as well as helping her side to promotion to Division 1 of the County Championship. In 2018, Windsor scored 104 runs in the County Championship as Hampshire won Division 1. She took three wickets at an average of 16.33 for Hampshire in the 2021 Women's Twenty20 Cup. In the 2022 Women's Twenty20 Cup, she played seven matches for Hampshire, scoring 75 runs. She was Hampshire's leading run-scorer in the 2023 Women's Twenty20 Cup, with 177 runs including two half-centuries.

In 2018, Windsor was called up as a replacement player for the injured Tash Farrant in the Southern Vipers squad for the Women's Cricket Super League, but did not play a match.

In 2020, Windsor returned to Southern Vipers the Rachael Heyhoe Flint Trophy. She appeared in 6 matches, including the final as her side won the tournament, scoring 112 runs at an average of 37.33. Her best innings came against South East Stars, in which she hit 47*. In 2021, Windsor was ever-present for the Vipers, across the Rachael Heyhoe Flint Trophy and the Charlotte Edwards Cup. In the final of the Rachael Heyhoe Flint Trophy, Windsor top-scored for her side with 47*, sharing an unbroken stand of 78 with Tara Norris to help the Vipers recover from 109/7 to chase down their target of 184 with two balls to spare. Windsor was named Player of the Match in the final. She also played five matches for Trent Rockets in The Hundred. In 2022, Windsor went on loan to Lightning for the first match of the Rachael Heyhoe Flint Trophy. She played the rest of the tournament for Southern Vipers, and overall scored 288 runs, the fourth most across the entire tournament. She scored two half-centuries in the tournament, 90 against South East Stars and 59 against North West Thunder. She also played for Oval Invincibles in The Hundred as the side won the competition, playing four matches for the side. She batted once in the tournament, in the final, where she scored 13* including hitting the winning runs. At the end of the 2022 season, it was announced that Windsor had signed her first professional contract with Southern Vipers.

In 2023, she was the fifth-highest run-scorer in the Rachael Heyhoe Flint Trophy, with 408 runs at an average of 45.33, including four half-centuries. She scored 57* in the final of the Rachael Heyhoe Flint Trophy, guiding her team to victory. She captained the side for one match in July 2023. She also played five matches for Welsh Fire in The Hundred. In 2024, she played 20 matches for Southern Vipers, across the Rachael Heyhoe Flint Trophy and the Charlotte Edwards Cup, scoring 196 runs.
