= Ella Chandler =

English cricketer

Personal information
- Full name: Ella Reseigh Chandler
- Born: 19 October 2000 (age 26); Frimley, Surrey, England
- Batting: Right-handed
- Bowling: Right-arm off break
- Role: All-rounder

Domestic team information
- Years: Team
- 2016–present: Hampshire
- 2019/20: Canterbury
- 2020–2022: Southern Vipers

Career statistics
Competition	WLA	WT20
Matches	31	42
Runs scored	466	719
Batting average	19.41	21.78
100s/50s	0/3	0/2
Top score	58	52
Balls bowled	145	240
Wickets	3	12
Bowling average	39.00	13.16
5 wickets in innings	0	0
10 wickets in match	0	0
Best bowling	2/22	4/12
Catches/stumpings	5/–	9/–
- Source: CricketArchive, 6 October 2022

Ella Reseigh Chandler (born 19 October 2000) is an English cricketer who currently plays for Hampshire. She plays as a right-handed batter as well as bowling occasional right-arm off break. She has previously played for Southern Vipers, as well as spending one season playing for Canterbury in 2019/20.

== Early life ==
Chandler was born on 19 October 2000 in Frimley, Surrey. She attended Farnham Heath End secondary school. She is currently training to become a paramedic.

== Domestic career ==
Chandler made her county debut in 2016, for Hampshire against Leicestershire, in which she scored her maiden county half-century, hitting 58. In 2017, she was her side's second-highest run-scorer in the Twenty20 Cup, including hitting two half-centuries, as well as helping her side to promotion to Division 1 of the County Championship. In 2018, Chandler was Hampshire's leading run-scorer in the Twenty20 Cup, with 206 runs, as well as taking 4/12 against Northamptonshire. She also played six matches and hit one half-century in the County Championship as Hampshire won Division 1. She was Hampshire's leading run-scorer in the 2021 Women's Twenty20 Cup, with 127 runs at an average of 25.40. She played seven matches for the side in the 2022 Women's Twenty20 Cup, scoring 102 runs at an average of 14.57.

Chandler also spent one season with Canterbury in 2019/20. Her best performances came in the Hallyburton Johnstone Shield, in which she hit 153 runs, including scoring 57 in a match against Central Districts.

In 2020, Chandler played for Southern Vipers in the Rachael Heyhoe Flint Trophy. She appeared in one match, against South East Stars, scoring 5 runs. In 2021, she played three matches in the Charlotte Edwards Cup, scoring 27 runs in two innings. Chandler was not initially included in the Southern Vipers squad for the 2022 season; she returned to the squad in July 2022, but did not play a match for the side that season.
