= Fi Morris =

English cricketer

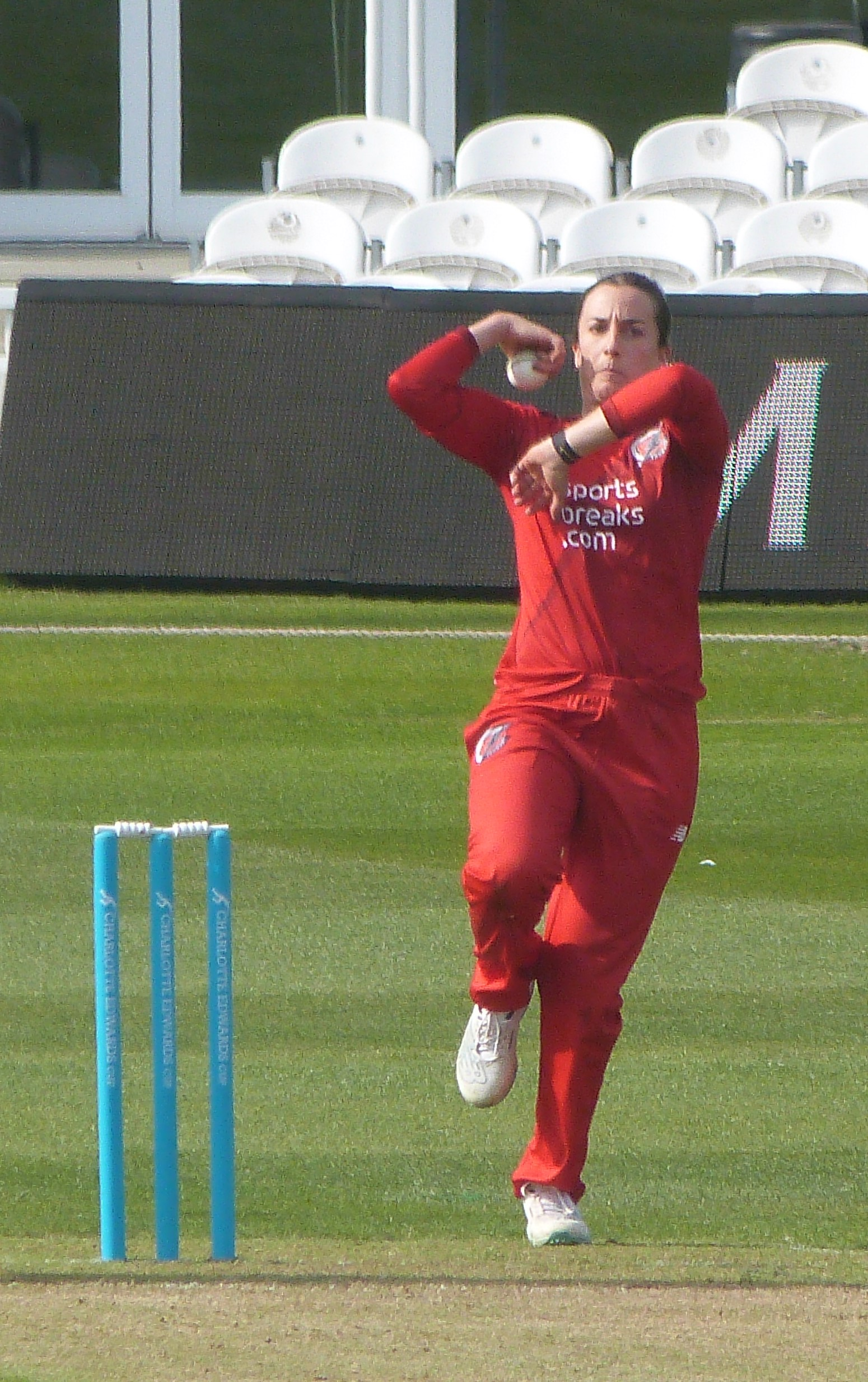
- Morris bowling for North West Thunder in May 2023

Personal information
- Full name: Fritha Mary Kie Morris
- Born: 31 January 1994 (age 32); Reading, Berkshire, England
- Batting: Right-handed
- Bowling: Right-arm off break
- Role: All-rounder

Domestic team information
- Years: Team
- 2008–2009: Oxfordshire
- 2010–2012: Gloucestershire
- 2013–2017: Berkshire
- 2016: Southern Vipers
- 2018–2021: Hampshire
- 2018–2019: Southern Vipers
- 2020–2022: Western Storm
- 2021: Southern Brave
- 2022: Gloucestershire
- 2022: Welsh Fire
- 2023–2024: North West Thunder
- 2023–present: Lancashire
- 2023–present: Manchester Originals

Career statistics
Competition	WLA	WT20
Matches	100	135
Runs scored	1,899	1,308
Batting average	22.34	14.53
100s/50s	1/7	0/1
Top score	127	50
Balls bowled	4,393	2,348
Wickets	134	127
Bowling average	20.78	17.94
5 wickets in innings	2	1
10 wickets in match	0	0
Best bowling	6/35	5/7
Catches/stumpings	34/–	32/–
- Source: CricketArchive, 17 October 2024

Fritha Mary Kie "Fi" Morris (born 31 January 1994) is an English cricketer who currently plays for Lancashire and Manchester Originals. An all-rounder, she is a right-arm off break bowler and right-handed batter. She has previously played for Oxfordshire, Gloucestershire, Berkshire, Hampshire, Southern Vipers, Western Storm, North West Thunder, Southern Brave and Welsh Fire.

== Early life ==
Morris was born on 31 January 1994 in Reading, Berkshire. She studied at the University of Exeter.

== Domestic career ==
Morris made her county debut in 2008, for Oxfordshire against Cornwall. She scored 12* and bowled three overs. In her second match, she took 4/46 against Gloucestershire. Morris was Oxfordshire's leading wicket-taker in the 2009 Women's Twenty20 Cup.

Morris moved to Gloucestershire ahead of the 2010 season. She hit her maiden county half-century in the 2010 Women's County Championship, scoring 52* against Buckinghamshire. Earlier in the same season, she took 4/12 against Dorset. The following Championship season, Morris was Gloucestershire's leading run-scorer and joint-leading wicket-taker, with 345 runs and 15 wickets. She also hit her maiden county century, scoring 127 against her former team Oxfordshire.

Morris moved to Berkshire ahead of the 2013 season, and remained there until the end of the 2017 season. She had a solid start at her new club, scoring 151 runs with a high score of 47, as well as taking 6 wickets in the 2013 Women's County Championship. She went on to be Berkshire's leading wicket-taker in the 2014 Women's County Championship, as well as in the 2015 and 2016 T20 Cups.

Ahead of the 2018 season, Morris moved to Hampshire and helped them win their first Championship title in her first season. She was their leading wicket-taker, with 15 wickets at an average of 11.93. She also equalled her best List A bowling at the time, taking 4/12 to help bowl Somerset out for 64. In the 2019 Championship, Morris was her side's joint-leading run-scorer and joint-leading wicket-taker, with 160 runs and 12 wickets. In the 2021 Women's Twenty20 Cup, she took 5 wickets at an average of 10.20, as well as scoring a match-winning 47* against Sussex. Morris moved back to Gloucestershire ahead of the 2022 Women's Twenty20 Cup. She played three matches for the side that season, scoring 23 runs and taking one wicket. She joined Lancashire for the 2023 Women's Twenty20 Cup, playing two matches for the side that season.

Morris was also in the Southern Vipers squad in the Women's Cricket Super League in 2016, 2018 and 2019. She played 3 matches in 2016, picking up 3 wickets. Returning to the squad for 2018, she achieved her best Twenty20 bowling, taking 4/22 against Surrey Stars. In 2019, she helped her side reach the Final, taking 5 wickets at an average of 28.60.

In 2020, Morris moved to Western Storm for the 2020 Rachael Heyhoe Flint Trophy. She played all 6 matches, scoring 115 runs at an average of 19.16, as well as taking 11 wickets, the joint-leading wicket-taker for the side. She took her maiden List A five-wicket haul, 5/27, against Sunrisers. In December 2020, it was announced that Morris was one of the 41 female cricketers that had signed a full-time domestic contract. In the 2021 Rachael Heyhoe Flint Trophy, Morris scored 169 runs and took 5 wickets, as well as taking 7 wickets in the 2021 Charlotte Edwards Cup. In The Hundred, she played for Southern Brave, taking 4 wickets as well as top-scoring for her side in the final, with 23. She played seven matches for Western Storm in 2022, across the Charlotte Edwards Cup and the Rachael Heyhoe Flint Trophy, scoring 75 runs and taking two wickets. She moved to Welsh Fire in The Hundred, playing two matches for her new side. At the end of the 2022 season, it was announced that Morris had joined North West Thunder. In 2023, she played 19 matches for the side, across the Rachael Heyhoe Flint Trophy and the Charlotte Edwards Cup, and was the side's leading run-scorer in the Charlotte Edwards Cup, with 209 runs. For Manchester Originals in The Hundred, she scored her maiden Twenty20 half-century. Earlier in the tournament, she took the first five-wicket haul in the Women's Hundred, and the best figures in The Hundred overall, with 5/7 against Birmingham Phoenix. In 2024, she played 22 matches for North West Thunder, across the Rachael Heyhoe Flint Trophy and the Charlotte Edwards Cup, scoring two half-centuries with a best bowling of 6/35.

Morris has also played for various England Academy and Development teams, including touring South Africa in 2013. She played for Emeralds in the 2012 Super Fours and Rubies in the 2013 Super Fours.
