= Paige Scholfield =

English cricketer (born 1995)

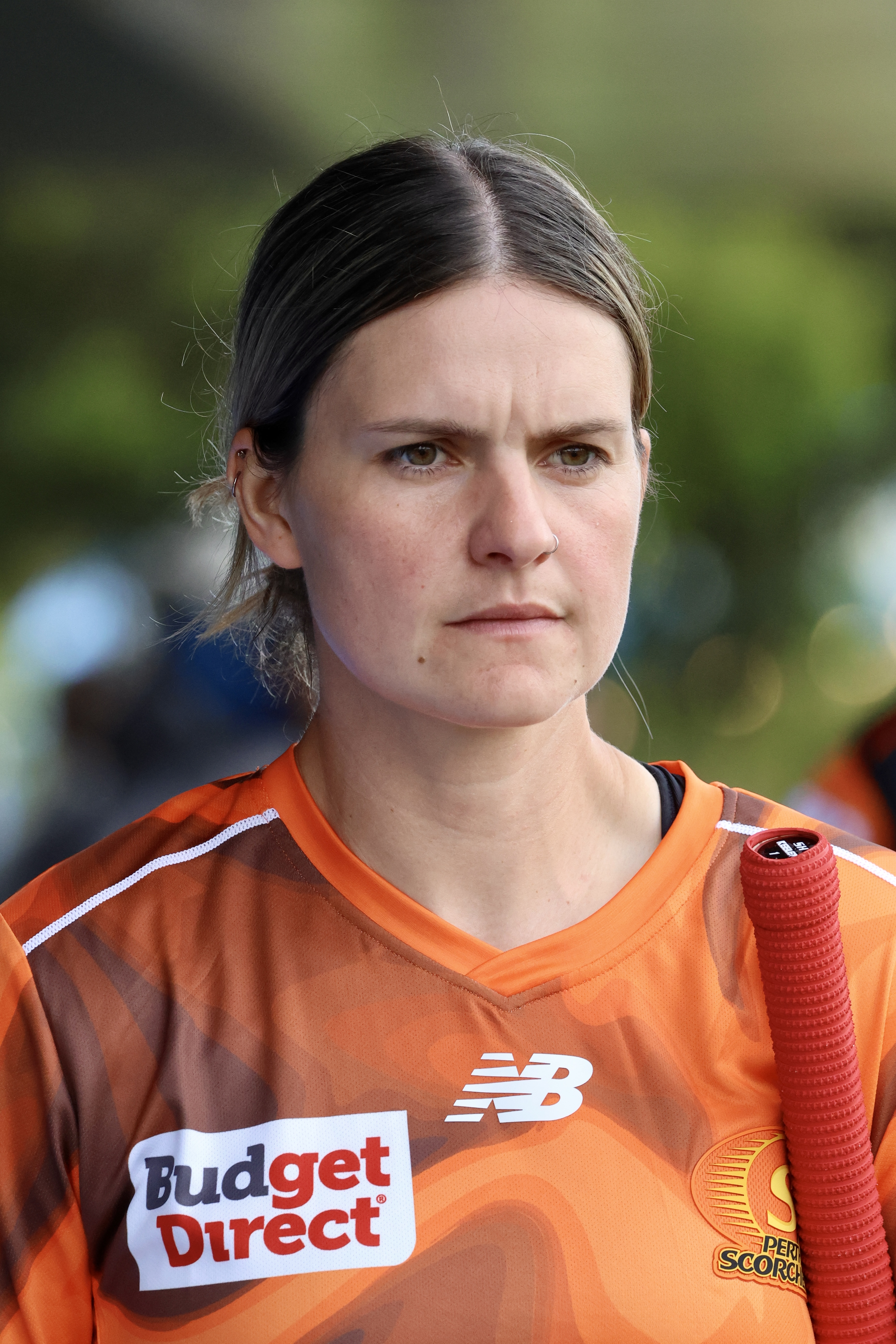
- Scholfield in 2025

Personal information
- Full name: Paige Jamie Scholfield
- Born: 19 December 1995 (age 30); Durban, KwaZulu-Natal, South Africa
- Batting: Right-handed
- Bowling: Right-arm medium
- Role: All-rounder

International information
- National side: England
- ODI debut (cap 149): 7 September 2024 v Ireland
- Last ODI: 9 September 2024 v Ireland
- T20I debut (cap 65): 14 September 2024 v Ireland
- Last T20I: 15 September 2024 v Ireland

Domestic team information
- Years: Team
- 2012–2024: Sussex
- 2016–2017: Loughborough Lightning
- 2018–2022: Southern Vipers
- 2021–2022: Southern Brave
- 2023–2024: South East Stars
- 2023–present: Oval Invincibles
- 2025–present: Surrey

Career statistics
Competition	WODI	WT20I	WLA	WT20
Matches	3	2	95	127
Runs scored	59	36	1,668	1,542
Batting average	19.66	18.00	24.89	16.94
100s/50s	0/0	0/0	2/6	0/5
Top score	31	34	134*	73*
Balls bowled	–	–	1,893	920
Wickets	–	–	51	48
Bowling average	–	–	26.60	21.18
5 wickets in innings	–	–	0	0
10 wickets in match	–	–	0	0
Best bowling	–	–	3/16	3/12
Catches/stumpings	0/–	0/–	40/–	44/1
- Source: CricketArchive, 18 October 2024

Paige Jamie Scholfield (born 19 December 1995) is an English cricketer who currently plays for Surrey and Oval Invincibles. An all-rounder, she is a right-handed batter and right-arm medium bowler. She has previously played for Sussex, Loughborough Lightning, Southern Vipers, South East Stars and Southern Brave.

== Early life ==
Scholfield was born on 19 December 1995 in Durban, South Africa. She attended Loughborough College. Scholfield has also been part of various England Academy and Development programmes, beginning in 2012.

== Domestic career ==
Scholfield made her county debut in 2012, for Sussex against Middlesex. She bowled three overs, taking 1/9. A year later, Scholfield was part of the Sussex team that won the 2013 Women's County Championship, and she hit her List A high score, of 48 against Middlesex. In 2014, Scholfield hit her maiden county half-century, scoring 63* in a Twenty20 against Surrey. The next season, she helped her side win the 2015 Women's Twenty20 Cup. In 2017, Scholfield achieved her best T20 bowling figures, taking 3/12 in a victory over Warwickshire. A year later, she achieved her best List A bowling figures, of 3/17 against Surrey. In the 2022 Women's Twenty20 Cup, Scholfield was Sussex's second-highest run-scorer and leading wicket-taker, with 182 runs and 12 wickets.

Scholfield also played for Loughborough Lightning from 2016 to 2017 and Southern Vipers from 2018 to 2019 in the Women's Cricket Super League. In 2016 she hit her highest KSL score, scoring 38 against Lancashire Thunder. In 2019, she was part of the Vipers team that reached the Final, as well as taking two wickets at an average of 13.50.

Scholfield continued playing for Southern Vipers in the 2020 Rachael Heyhoe Flint Trophy. She appeared in all 7 matches, including her side's 38-run victory in the Final over Northern Diamonds, and took 9 wickets at an average of 23.55. In 2021, Scholfield played 5 matches, scoring 93 runs and taking 6 wickets, in the Rachael Heyhoe Flint Trophy as the Vipers retained their title. She was also ever-present in the Charlotte Edwards Cup, and hit a crucial 41* from 36 balls in the final group stage match to beat Lightning off the final ball and qualify for Finals Day. She was also in the Southern Brave squad in The Hundred, but did not play a match. She was ever-present for Southern Vipers in the 2022 season, across the Charlotte Edwards Cup and the Rachael Heyhoe Flint Trophy, with her main contributions coming in the Rachael Heyhoe Flint Trophy, where she made her maiden List A half-century, scoring 74 against Sunrisers, as well as taking 11 wickets overall at an average of 20.09. She was also again in the Southern Brave squad in The Hundred, but did not play a match.

At the end of the 2022 season, it was announced that Scholfield had signed for South East Stars. On 22 April 2023, she scored her first century in List A cricket, with 111* to help her side beat North West Thunder by 131 runs. On 1 May 2023, she scored another century, 134* against Western Storm, which was the highest score in the Rachael Heyhoe Flint Trophy that season. She ended the season as the fourth-leading run-scorer in the Rachael Heyhoe Flint Trophy, with 439 runs at an average of 39.90. She also played seven matches for Oval Invincibles in The Hundred, scoring 78 runs and taking 8 wickets. In 2024, she played 20 matches for South East Stars, across the Rachael Heyhoe Flint Trophy and the Charlotte Edwards Cup, scoring three half-centuries in each competition.

== International career ==
Scholfield made her One Day International debut for England against Ireland at Stormont in Belfast on 7 September 2024, scoring 31 runs off 33 balls batting at number four. She played her first T20I against the same opposition in Dublin on 14 September 2024. Schofield was named in the England squad for the T20 part of their tour to South Africa in November 2024. She dropped out of the squad just days before the series began due to an ankle injury.
