= Arundel Castle Cricket Ground =

Cricket ground

Coordinates: 50°51′31″N 0°33′28″W

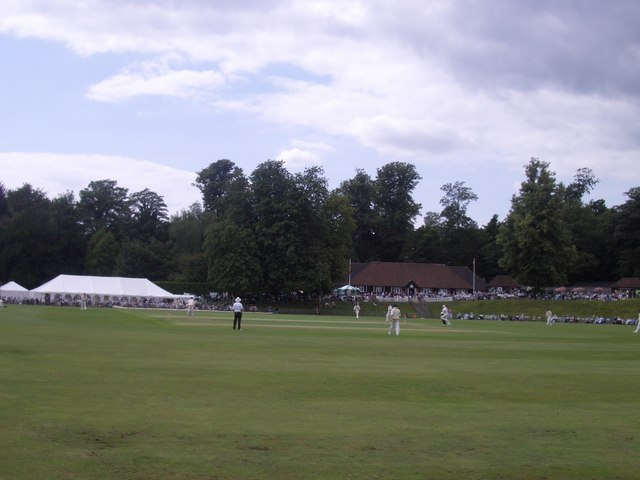
- The West Indians are playing, with Brian Lara on strike
- Interactive map of Arundel Castle Cricket Ground

Ground information
- Location: Arundel, West Sussex
- Country: England
- Establishment: 1895
- Capacity: 6,000
- End names
- Park End; Castle End

International information
- First women's ODI: 28 July 1993: England v West Indies
- Last women's ODI: 7 September 2008: England v India
- Only women's T20I: 12 September 2012: England v West Indies

Team information
Sussex	(1972 – present)
Hampshire	(2020)
- As of 5 September 2020; Source: Ground Profile

Arundel Castle Cricket Ground is a cricket ground in Arundel, West Sussex, England, nearby to Arundel Castle. It has been in use since 1952. The ground was first used by the Sussex 1st XI in 1972 for limited-over matches and in 1990 for County Championship matches. The ground was temporarily used by Hampshire as their home venue for 2020 Bob Willis Trophy matches.

== Cricket history ==
Many matches have been played at the ground over the years by Sussex, often as part of the Arundel Festival, an annual event held in August. Arundel Castle's first List A match was a 1972 match between Sussex and Gloucestershire in the John Player League. Gloucestershire won the match by 2 wickets, helped by a five-wicket haul from Mike Procter. In 1990, Arundel Castle hosted its first County Championship match. The match was between Sussex and Hampshire and ended in a draw, after Colin Wells scored a century for Sussex and Chris Smith scored a century for Hampshire.

The ground has hosted some tour matches, and also MCC matches against international A sides. The first of these matches was in 2000 as part of Zimbabwe's tour of England against a West Indians team. The match ended in a draw, with West Indians Sherwin Campbell, Brian Lara and Shivnarine Chanderpaul all scoring centuries, as well as Zimbabwe and Sussex cricketer Murray Goodwin. In 2002, Arundel Castle hosted a drawn match between Indians and West Indies A and in 2003 it hosted a drawn match between India A and South Africans. The ground hosted MCC matches against the Australians in 2001, the West Indians in 2004, and Sri Lanka A in 2007; the MCC lost all three matches.

In June 2010, the Unicorns hosted Sussex in a match at Arundel Castle. The Unicorns chased down Sussex's score of 325/4 from 40 overs, scoring 327/4, which at the time was the highest successful run chase in the history of 40-over cricket. Batsman Wes Durston scored 117 from 68 balls for the Unicorns.

In 2015, a T20 match between Sussex and Surrey was abandoned after Surrey cricketers Moisés Henriques and Rory Burns collided with each other whilst attempting a catch. Both players were subsequently hospitalised.

In 2020, Hampshire played their home games in the 2020 Bob Willis Trophy at Arundel as their normal home venue of the Rose Bowl in Southampton was in use by England for Test matches.

== Other history ==
In September 2003, Zoological Society of London released 1,000 crickets – specifically Gryllus campestris, the endangered British field cricket – into the wild at the Arundel Castle ground and another undisclosed location in West Sussex.

In 2012, The Sunday Telegraph included Arundel Castle in their list of "Britain's best 5 cricket grounds", calling it a "great stop on a family day out in the Sussex countryside." In 2015, The Independent listed the ground in the 10 most picturesque outgrounds to watch County Cricket.

== Records ==
=== First-class cricket records ===
Category	Information
Highest Team Score	Leicestershire (566/8dec against Sussex) in 1999
Lowest Team Score	Sussex (71 against Worcestershire) in 1997
Best Batting Performance	Murray Goodwin (235 Runs for Sussex against Yorkshire) in 2006
Best Bowling Performance	Chris Cairns (8/47 for Nottinghamshire against Sussex) in 1995

=== List A cricket records ===
Category	Information
Highest Team Score	Unicorns (327–4 in 40 overs against Sussex) in 2010
Lowest Team Score	Sussex (96 in 17.5 overs against Gloucestershire) in 2006
Best Batting Performance	Chris Adams (163 Runs for Sussex against Middlesex) in 1999
Best Bowling Performance	Mike Procter (5/10 for Gloucestershire against Sussex) in 1972
