= Georgia Adams =

English cricketer

Personal information
- Full name: Georgia Louise Adams
- Born: 4 October 1993 (age 33); Chesterfield, Derbyshire, England
- Batting: Right-handed
- Bowling: Right-arm off break
- Role: All-rounder
- Relatives: Chris Adams (father)

International information
- National side: England
- T20I debut (cap 63): 14 September 2024 v Ireland
- Last T20I: 15 September 2024 v Ireland

Domestic team information
- Years: Team
- 2009–2024: Sussex
- 2016–2017: Southern Vipers
- 2018–2019: Loughborough Lightning
- 2020–2024: Southern Vipers
- 2021: Oval Invincibles
- 2022–2025: Southern Brave
- 2023/24: Adelaide Strikers
- 2023/24–present: New South Wales
- 2024/25: Sydney Thunder
- 2025–present: Hampshire
- 2026-present: Trent Rockets

Career statistics
| Competition | WLA | WT20 |
|---|---|---|
| Matches | 91 | 162 |
| Runs scored | 2,718 | 2,784 |
| Batting average | 33.97 | 23.79 |
| 100s/50s | 3/18 | 0/15 |
| Top score | 154* | 88* |
| Balls bowled | 2,163 | 985 |
| Wickets | 61 | 59 |
| Bowling average | 24.78 | 17.44 |
| 5 wickets in innings | 0 | 0 |
| 10 wickets in match | 0 | 0 |
| Best bowling | 4/30 | 4/11 |
| Catches/stumpings | 57/– | 71/– |
- Source: CricketArchive, 18 December 2023

Georgia Louise Adams (born 4 October 1993) is an English cricketer who is the captain of Hampshire. She has previously played for Sussex, Southern Vipers, Adelaide Strikers and New South Wales. Adams has previously played for Loughborough Lightning in the Women's Cricket Super League, plus Southern Brave and Oval Invincibles in The Hundred. Adams is an all-rounder.

== Personal life ==
Adams is from Chesterfield, Derbyshire, England. She is the daughter of Chris Adams, a former captain of Sussex men's team, and an England international. Her sister Mollie has also played for Sussex.

== Career ==
=== Domestic career ===
Adams made her debut for Sussex in 2009. In 2014, Adams captained Sussex for the first time, in a Women's County Championship match against Yorkshire. She scored 106 from 111 balls, and it was her first century. In 2015, Adams was captain for multiple Twenty20 Cup matches, as Sussex won the tournament. In 2016, Adams was top scorer in Sussex's opening two matches.

In 2017, Adams became Sussex permanent captain, taking over from Georgia Elwiss. Adams had previously captained the side when Elwiss was on international duty with England. She became captain of the side for County Championship and County T20 matches. That year, Adams lead Sussex to promotion from Women's County Championship Division 2. In the opening match of the championship against Derbyshire Women, Adams scored 106 from 104 balls. In 2019, Adams played in her 100th game for Sussex. She was the third player, and the youngest, to make 100 appearances for Sussex Women.

Adams played for Southern Vipers in the 2016 and 2017 Women's Cricket Super League seasons. She was run out for 15 by Anya Shrubsole in the 2016 final against Western Storm, and played in the 2017 final where Vipers beat Storm to win the tournament. Adams moved from Southern Vipers to Loughborough Lightning for the 2018 season. In the 2019 season, Adams scored 50 from 33 balls for Lightning against Lancashire Thunder.

In 2020, Adams was given a regional retainer contract, and was later selected in the Vipers squad for the Rachael Heyhoe Flint Trophy. She captained the Vipers for the Rachael Heyhoe Flint Trophy, and in a match against Western Storm, Adams scored 154*. At the time, it was the seventh highest women's List A cricket score. Adams scored 500 runs in seven innings in the Rachael Heyhoe Flint Trophy, the most runs of any player in the tournament. In December 2020, Adams was one of 41 women's cricketers given a full-time domestic cricket contract. Adams has signed for Oval Invincibles in The Hundred. The 2020 season of The Hundred was cancelled due to the COVID-19 pandemic, and Adams was retained by the Invincibles for the 2021 season.

In 2021, Adams captained Southern Vipers to their second Rachael Heyhoe Flint Trophy title, and was the side's second-highest run-scorer and second-highest wicket-taker, with 233 runs and 12 wickets. She also won The Hundred with the Oval Invincibles. In April 2022, she was signed by the Southern Brave for the 2022 season of The Hundred. In 2022, she captained Southern Vipers to winning the Charlotte Edwards Cup, as well as scoring 363 runs and taking eleven wickets for the side across the Charlotte Edwards Cup and the Rachael Heyhoe Flint Trophy. She also scored 100 runs and took 9 wickets for Southern Brave in The Hundred.

In 2023, she captained Southern Vipers to the domestic double, winning the Rachael Heyhoe Flint Trophy and the Charlotte Edwards Cup, as well as winning The Hundred with Southern Brave. She was also the second-highest run-scorer and fourth-highest wicket-taker in the Rachael Heyhoe Flint Trophy, the third-highest run-scorer in the Charlotte Edwards Cup, and the leading wicket-taker in The Hundred. She played for Adelaide Strikers in the 2023–24 Women's Big Bash League, taking four wickets in 13 matches as her side won the competition. She went on to play for New South Wales in the 2023–24 Women's National Cricket League.

In November 2024, Adams was named captain of the newly professional Hampshire following the restructuring of English domestic women's cricket set to start in the 2025 season.

=== International career ===
Adams has played for England under-19s. In 2016, she represented the England Academy team in matches against Sri Lanka. In 2021, she played for the England A team in a match against an England XI. She scored 54. Adams made her made her senior England debut against Ireland in a T20I in Dublin on 14 September 2024.

== Honours ==
=== Team ===
- Women's Twenty20 Cup champions: 2015
- Women's Cricket Super League champions: 2016
- Rachael Heyhoe Flint Trophy champions: 2020, 2021, 2023
- The Hundred champions: 2021, 2023
- Charlotte Edwards Cup champions: 2022, 2023

=== Individual ===
- Walter Lawrence Women's Award winner: 2020
