= Nicholas Denning =

English cricketer

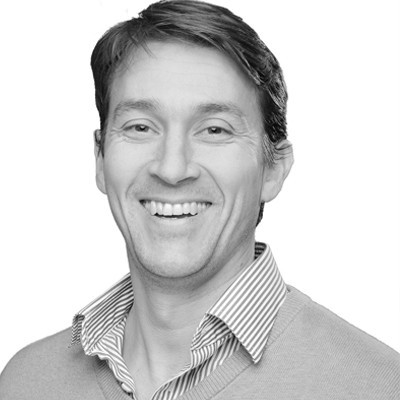

Personal information
- Full name: Nicholas Alexander Denning
- Born: 3 October 1978 (age 48); Ascot, Berkshire, England
- Batting: Right-handed
- Bowling: Right-arm fast-medium

Domestic team information
- Years: Team
- 1999–2008: Berkshire
- 2003: Essex

Head coaching information
- Years: Team
- 2006–2016: Berkshire Women
- 2016–2019: Southern Vipers

Career statistics
Competition	List A
Matches	8
Runs scored	5
Batting average	2.50
100s/50s	0/0
Top score	2
Balls bowled	357
Wickets	9
Bowling average	34.66
5 wickets in innings	0
10 wickets in match	0
Best bowling	3/22
Catches/stumpings	0/–
- Source: Cricinfo, 25 September 2010

Nicholas Alexander Denning (born 3 October 1978) is an English former cricketer and cricket coach. A right-handed batsman who bowled right-arm fast-medium, he played minor counties cricket for Berkshire and List A cricket for Essex. He later became a prominent coach in the women's game, leading the Southern Vipers to victory in the inaugural Kia Super League in 2016.

== Early life and education ==
Denning was educated at Hall Grove School in Bagshot, Surrey, before attending Bradfield College in Berkshire.

== Playing career ==
In 1999, Denning made his debut for Berkshire in the MCCA Knockout Trophy against the Kent Cricket Board. In 2000, he made his Minor Counties Championship debut for the county against Dorset. From 2000 to 2008, he represented the county in 29 Championship matches, the last of which came against Lincolnshire in the 2008 Championship final, which Berkshire won. Furthermore, from 1999 to 2007, he represented the county in 11 MCCA Knockout Trophy matches, the last of which came against Wales Minor Counties. Denning also played 2 List-A matches for the county. His first List-A match for Berkshire came against Wales Minor Counties in the 2000 NatWest Trophy, with his second match coming against the Kent Cricket Board in the 2001 Cheltenham & Gloucester Trophy.

Additionally, he also played List-A matches for Berkshire. His List-A debut for the county came against Lincolnshire in the 1st round of the 2002 Cheltenham & Gloucester Trophy which was played in 2001. From 2001 to 2005, he represented the county in 5 List-A matches, with his final List-A match coming when Berkshire played Gloucestershire in the 2005 Cheltenham & Gloucester Trophy at Sonning Lane, Reading.

During the 2003 season he also played 3 List-A matches for Essex against the touring Pakistanis, the touring Zimabweans and finally against Glamorgan in the 2003 National League. In his combined List-A career, he took 9 wickets at a bowling average of 34.66, with best figures of 3/22.

== Coaching career ==
Denning began his coaching career as Head Coach of Berkshire Women from 2006 to 2016, during which time they reached the T20 Championship Finals three times and won it once.

In January 2016, he was appointed inaugural head coach of the Southern Vipers, Hampshire's team in the new Kia Super League (KSL). Under his leadership, the Southern Vipers won the inaugural KSL in 2016, defeating Western Storm by seven wickets in the final. The Vipers were also runners-up in 2017 and 2019. Denning coached the side until 2019.

Denning is head coach at Maidenhead and Bray Cricket Club.

== Post-playing career ==
Denning later became a Personal Development Manager at the Professional Cricketers' Association (PCA), working with current professional cricketers on personal development and preparation for life after cricket. He led the PCA's work on social media education for professional squads, delivering workshops in partnership with Sporting Chance on the impact of online abuse on mental health.
