= Tash Farrant =

English cricketer (born 1996)

Personal information
- Full name: Natasha Eleni Farrant
- Born: 29 May 1996 (age 30); Athens, Greece
- Batting: Left-handed
- Bowling: Left-arm fast-medium
- Role: Bowler

International information
- National side: England (2013–2022)
- ODI debut (cap 125): 3 November 2013 v West Indies
- Last ODI: 8 February 2022 v Australia
- T20I debut (cap 32): 5 July 2013 v Pakistan
- Last T20I: 9 September 2021 v New Zealand

Domestic team information
- Years: Team
- 2012–2024: Kent
- 2016–2019: Southern Vipers
- 2016/17: Western Australia
- 2020–2024: South East Stars
- 2021–2025: Oval Invincibles
- 2025: Surrey

Career statistics
Competition	WODI	WT20I	WLA	WT20
Matches	6	18	59	111
Runs scored	42	7	375	372
Batting average	14.00	7.00	12.93	10.05
100s/50s	0/0	0/0	0/0	0/0
Top score	22	3*	45	37
Balls bowled	253	388	2,849	2,208
Wickets	5	15	87	121
Bowling average	38.00	27.00	19.43	17.37
5 wickets in innings	0	0	3	0
10 wickets in match	0	0	0	0
Best bowling	2/31	2/15	6/16	4/10
Catches/stumpings	1/–	4/–	11/–	26/–
- Source: CricketArchive, 18 October 2023

Natasha Eleni Farrant (born 29 May 1996) is an English former cricketer who played for Surrey, Oval Invincibles and England. She played as a left-arm fast-medium bowler. She had previously played for Southern Vipers in the Women's Cricket Super League, as well as spending a season with Western Australia.

== Early life ==
Farrant was born in Athens, Greece. She started playing for a Kent Women junior team at the age of eight. She attended Sevenoaks School, and at the age of 11, she joined the boys' school team.

== Domestic career ==
Farrant made her Kent senior team debut in 2012, and took 5/9 in the match. She was part of the Kent side that won the 2016 Women's County Championship after winning seven of their eight matches. In that season's match between Kent Women and Staffordshire Women, Farrant took six wickets for 16 runs. Farrant signed for Surrey in September 2024.

In 2016, Farrant signed for Southern Vipers ahead of the inaugural Women's Cricket Super League. During the 2018 Women's Cricket Super League, Farrant took a hat-trick for Southern Vipers against Lancashire Thunder. Thunder won the match nevertheless. She took 12 wickets in the group stage of the 2019 Women's Cricket Super League, more than any other player, and 14 wickets in the whole tournament. In the final, Farrant took 2/19, the best figures by a Vipers bowler, as they lost to Western Storm. Since 2019, Farrant has worked with Trent College coach Scott Boswell, and she has worked as the head of girls' cricket at Trent College.

Farrant was given a regional retainer contract for the 2020 season. She captained the South East Stars in that season's Rachael Heyhoe Flint Trophy. Farrant chose to represent the South East regional hub after she rejected an offer from the East Midlands hub. In December 2020, Farrant was one of 41 women's cricketers given a full-time domestic cricket contract. In 2021, she was signed by the Oval Invincibles for The Hundred and won the title with them.

Farrant was again signed by the Oval Invincibles for the 2022 season of The Hundred, and played one match for South East Stars in the 2022 Charlotte Edwards Cup, but missed the rest of the 2022 season due to a back injury. In September 2024 she signed for Surrey for the 2025 season.

== International career ==
Farrant has played for the England under-19s. In 2013, at the age of 17, she received her first call up for the England women's cricket team, for a series against Pakistan. Regular bowlers Katherine Brunt and Laura Marsh were injured, which allowed Farrant to be called up. Farrant made her Women's Twenty20 International (WT20I) debut in the series. She took two wickets in her second over, and finished with figures of 2/15. Later in the year, Farrant played one Women's One Day International (WODI) against the West Indies. She was the youngest member of the England squad that won the 2013–14 Ashes in Australia.

In April 2014, she was one of 18 players awarded the first set of England and Wales Cricket Board central contracts for women players. She was the youngest recipient of a central contract. In April 2015, she was named in the England women's Academy squad tour to Dubai, where England women played their Australian counterparts in two 50-over games, and two Twenty20 matches. Between 2014 and 2016, Farrant did not play any international matches, but she returned to the England squad in 2016 replacing the injured Katherine Brunt. Farrant was named in the England squad for the 2016 ICC Women's World Twenty20, the first time that she has been selected for an ICC event. She did not play any matches, but kept her squad place for the Pakistan ODI series. In October 2018, she was named in England's squad for the 2018 ICC Women's World Twenty20 tournament in the West Indies. She did not make an appearance in the tournament. Between 2013 and 2018, Farrant made 15 appearances for England. In 2019, Farrant's ECB central contract was terminated.

In January 2021, Farrant was recalled to the England team for their series against New Zealand, as Anya Shrubsole and Katie George were injured. She played in a warm up game, taking 1/17 in her first appearance in an England shirt since 2018. She played in the first match of the series, her first WODI appearance in eight years. She took two wickets in the match. In June 2021, Farrant was named as in England's Test squad for their one-off match against India. In November 2021, Farrant regained her central contract with England. The following month, Farrant was named in England's squad for their tour to Australia to contest the Women's Ashes. In February 2022, she was named in England's team for the 2022 Women's Cricket World Cup in New Zealand.

=== Retirement ===
On 16 February 2026, it was announced that Farrant had been forced to retire from all professional cricket, due to a recurring back injury.
