= Katie George (cricketer) =

English cricketer

Personal information
- Full name: Katie Louise George
- Born: 7 April 1999 (age 27); Haywards Heath, West Sussex, England
- Batting: Right-handed
- Bowling: Left-arm medium
- Role: All-rounder

International information
- National side: England
- ODI debut (cap 131): 7 July 2018 v New Zealand
- Last ODI: 10 July 2018 v New Zealand
- T20I debut (cap 43): 23 March 2018 v India
- Last T20I: 1 July 2018 v New Zealand

Domestic team information
- Years: Team
- 2013–2022: Hampshire (squad no. 99)
- 2016–2018: Southern Vipers
- 2019: Yorkshire Diamonds
- 2020–2022: Western Storm
- 2021–2022, 2025: Welsh Fire
- 2023–2024: Central Sparks
- 2023: Manchester Originals
- 2024: Trent Rockets
- 2025–present: Warwickshire
- 2026–present: London Spirit

Career statistics
Competition	WODI	WT20I	WLA	WT20
Matches	2	5	82	134
Runs scored	9	0	1,711	1,185
Batting average	9.00	0.00	25.53	14.62
100s/50s	0/0	0/0	1/9	0/3
Top score	9	0	127	67
Balls bowled	75	78	2,679	1,321
Wickets	4	2	74	57
Bowling average	17.50	58.50	26.75	26.15
5 wickets in innings	0	0	1	0
10 wickets in match	0	0	0	0
Best bowling	3/36	1/22	5/50	4/36
Catches/stumpings	1/–	0/–	37/–	53/–
- Source: CricketArchive, 6 August 2026

Katie Louise George (born 7 April 1999) is an English cricketer who plays for Warwickshire and London Spirit. A right-handed batter and left-arm pace bowler, she made her Hampshire debut in 2013. She has played 5 T20Is and 2 ODIs for England, all in 2018.

== Early life ==
George was born on 7 April 1999 in Haywards Heath, West Sussex.

== Domestic career ==
George made her debut for Hampshire in a 2013 Women's County Championship relegation play-off match against Oxfordshire. She took two wickets and scored 18 runs as her side won by 5 wickets. She did not play again until 2015, but had a successful season in both the County Championship and the Twenty20 Cup, taking 8 and 7 wickets, respectively. George was thereafter a regular in Hampshire's side, and was their second highest wicket-taker in their Championship winning season in 2018.

George was part of the Southern Vipers squad in the Women's Cricket Super League between 2016 and 2018, winning the tournament with them in 2016. In 2019, she played for Yorkshire Diamonds, and took 4 wickets with an economy of 6.85.

In 2020, George played two matches for Western Storm in the Rachael Heyhoe Flint Trophy, taking two wickets and scoring 19 runs. Injury limited her to just batting in the 2021 season, where she played one Rachael Heyhoe Flint Trophy match for Western Storm, scoring 37, and five Charlotte Edwards Cup matches, scoring 87 runs including 47* to guide her side to victory over North West Thunder. She also played 8 matches for Welsh Fire in The Hundred. She played eleven matches for Western Storm in 2022, across the Charlotte Edwards Cup and the Rachael Heyhoe Flint Trophy. She scored one half-century, hitting 74 from 43 deliveries in Storm's Rachael Heyhoe Flint Trophy victory over Sunrisers. She was ever-present for Welsh Fire in The Hundred, scoring 23 runs and taking one wicket. In November 2022, it was announced that George had signed for Central Sparks for the following season. In 2023, she played 19 matches for Central Sparks, across the Rachael Heyhoe Flint Trophy and the Charlotte Edwards Cup, including scoring 251 runs and taking 18 wickets in the Rachael Heyhoe Flint Trophy. She also played six matches for Manchester Originals in The Hundred.

== International career ==
In March 2018, George was named in the England squad for their tri-series against India and Australia. In a warm-up match prior to the series, she took a hat-trick against India A Women. She played three matches in the tri-series, but failed to make an impact.

In June 2018, George was named in the squad for part of England's tri-series against New Zealand and South Africa. She played two matches, and took two wickets, including her first at international level of Amy Satterthwaite.

She made her Women's One Day International cricket (WODI) debut for England Women in the following series against New Zealand Women on 7 July 2018, and took one wicket. She performed better in the second match of the series, being one of the "stand-out" bowlers as she took 3/36 from 7 overs.

In February 2019, George was awarded a rookie contract by the England and Wales Cricket Board (ECB) for 2019 and in 2020 she was named in a squad of 24 players to begin training following the COVID-19 pandemic, but she has not yet played another game for England.

== Personal life ==
As of 2026, she was seeing fellow England cricketer Issy Wong.
