= Carla Rudd =

English cricketer (born 1993)

Personal information
- Full name: Carla Elizabeth Rudd
- Born: 30 December 1993 (age 32); Hastings, East Sussex, England
- Batting: Right-handed
- Role: Wicket-keeper

Domestic team information
- Years: Team
- 2009–2011: Sussex
- 2010: → Middlesex (on loan)
- 2011–2018: Berkshire
- 2016–2022: Southern Vipers
- 2019–2022: Sussex
- 2021–2022: Southern Brave

Career statistics
Competition	WLA	WT20
Matches	79	127
Runs scored	859	668
Batting average	15.07	14.21
100s/50s	0/2	0/1
Top score	79	51
Catches/stumpings	49/32	37/64
- Source: CricketArchive, 9 December 2022

Carla Elizabeth Rudd (born 30 December 1993) is an English former cricketer who played as a wicket-keeper and right-handed batter. She played for Sussex, Middlesex, Berkshire, Southern Vipers and Southern Brave.

== Early life ==
Rudd was born on 30 December 1993 in Hastings, East Sussex. During her playing career, she worked as a cricket coach at Felsted School.

== Domestic career ==
=== County cricket ===
Rudd made her county debut in 2009, for Sussex against Kent. In 2010, she spent part of the season with Middlesex, playing six matches and making 4 dismissals. In 2011, Rudd played one match for Sussex before moving to Berkshire. She made 108 runs at an average of 27.00 in her first County Championship season with her new side, but overall was more successful as a wicket-keeper, for example in 2014 achieving 8 dismissals in the County Championship and 10, the most overall, in the Twenty20 Cup. In 2016, she hit her first List A half-century, scoring 79 off 71 balls against Sussex. She followed this up with two more half-centuries two seasons later, 55 in the County Championship and 51 in the Twenty20 Cup.

In 2019, Rudd returned to former county Sussex and helped them to 3rd in the County Championship in her first season, scoring 135 runs and making 11 dismissals. She played four matches for the side in the 2021 Women's Twenty20 Cup, scoring 19 runs and making four dismissals. She again played four matches for the side in 2022 Women's Twenty20 Cup, scoring 37 runs and making two dismissals.

=== Regional cricket ===
Rudd also played for Southern Vipers in the Women's Cricket Super League in every season of the competition, between 2016 and 2019. She played 28 matches across the four seasons, scoring 23 runs but also taking 7 catches and making 17 stumpings. She played in the final as her side won the 2016 competition, and was joint-second across the whole tournament for dismissals in 2017.

In 2020, Rudd continued playing for Southern Vipers in the Rachael Heyhoe Flint Trophy. She appeared in all seven matches as her side won the competition, scoring 81 runs and making 7 dismissals, the second most for a wicket-keeper in the tournament. She was again ever-present in the 2021 season, across the Rachael Heyhoe Flint Trophy and the Charlotte Edwards Cup. She had the joint-most dismissals in the Rachael Heyhoe Flint Trophy, with 10 dismissals. She also played for Southern Brave in The Hundred, making 10 dismissals in 9 matches. She played 11 matches for Southern Vipers in 2022, across the Charlotte Edwards Cup and the Rachael Heyhoe Flint Trophy, making 14 dismissals. She also played every match for Southern Brave in The Hundred, making 5 dismissals.

=== Other cricket ===
Rudd also played in the 2013 Super Fours, for Emeralds.

=== Retirement and post-playing career ===
On 9 December 2022, Rudd announced her retirement from all cricket with immediate effect, choosing instead to focus on her new appointment as Director of Sport at The Leys School. At the time of her retirement, she was Southern Vipers' most-capped player, and won four trophies with the side.
