= England women's cricket team in New Zealand in 2023–24 =

International cricket tour

	New Zealand	England
- Dates: 19 March – 7 April 2024
Captains	Sophie Devine (Note: Suzie Bates captained New Zealand in the first T20I, while Amelia Kerr captained New Zealand in the fifth T20I and the first two ODIs.)	Heather Knight

One Day International series
- Results: England won the 3-match series 2–1
Most runs	Sophie Devine (100)	Amy Jones (190)
Most wickets	Jess Kerr (7)	Nat Sciver-Brunt (5)
- Player of the series: Amy Jones (Eng)

Twenty20 International series
- Results: England won the 5-match series 4–1
Most runs	Amelia Kerr (114)	Maia Bouchier (223)
Most wickets	Amelia Kerr (6)	Charlie Dean (7)
- Player of the series: Maia Bouchier (Eng)

The England women's cricket team toured New Zealand in March and April 2024 to play three One Day International (ODI) and five Twenty20 International (T20I) matches. The ODI series formed part of the 2022–2025 ICC Women's Championship.

Along with the international fixtures, the countries' respective A teams contested three 20-over and three 50-over matches.

England won the T20I series 4–1. England also secured the ODI series with a game to spare. The ODI series eventually finished 2–1 in favor of the tourists after a century by Sophie Devine helped New Zealand to a consolation win in third match.

== Squads ==
New Zealand		England	
ODIs	T20Is	ODIs	T20Is
Sophie Devine (c); Suzie Bates; Bernadine Bezuidenhout (wk); Eden Carson; Izzy Gaze (wk); Maddy Green; Mikaela Greig; Brooke Halliday; Fran Jonas; Leigh Kasperek; Amelia Kerr; Jess Kerr; ~~Rosemary Mair~~; Molly Penfold; Georgia Plimmer; Hannah Rowe; Lea Tahuhu	Sophie Devine (c); Suzie Bates; Bernadine Bezuidenhout (wk); Eden Carson; Izzy Gaze (wk); Maddy Green; Mikaela Greig; Brooke Halliday; Fran Jonas; Leigh Kasperek; Amelia Kerr; Jess Kerr; Rosemary Mair; Georgia Plimmer; Hannah Rowe; Lea Tahuhu	Heather Knight (c); Tammy Beaumont; Lauren Bell; Maia Bouchier; Alice Capsey; Kate Cross; Charlie Dean; Sophia Dunkley; Sophie Ecclestone; Lauren Filer; ~~Sarah Glenn~~; Kirstie Gordon; Bess Heath (wk); Amy Jones (wk); Nat Sciver-Brunt; Danni Wyatt	Heather Knight (c); Hollie Armitage; Tammy Beaumont; Lauren Bell; Maia Bouchier; Alice Capsey; Charlie Dean; Sophia Dunkley; Sophie Ecclestone; Lauren Filer; Danielle Gibson; Sarah Glenn; Bess Heath (wk); Amy Jones (wk); Nat Sciver-Brunt; Linsey Smith; Danni Wyatt

England named Hollie Armitage and Linsey Smith in their squad for the first three T20Is only, with Alice Capsey, Sophie Ecclestone, Nat Sciver-Brunt and Danni Wyatt joining the squads for the last two matches of the series after playing in the Women's Premier League in India. Sarah Glenn was ruled out of the last two T20Is and first two ODIs due to injury. Glenn was further ruled out of the entire ODI series.

New Zealand named Eden Carson in their squad for the first three T20Is and Leigh Kasperek for last two T20Is. Amelia Kerr and Sophie Devine were not available for the first T20I, with Georgia Plimmer and Mikaela Greig added to the squad. Suzie Bates was named captain for the first T20I in the absence of Devine. Devine was also ruled out of the fifth T20I due to a quad injury, with Plimmer replacing her in the squad. Amelia Kerr captained New Zealand in the fifth T20I.

Devine was also ruled out of the first two ODIs, with Leigh Kasperek added to the squad as cover. Amelia Kerr was named captain in Devine's absence. On 4 April 2024, Rosemary Mair was ruled out the ODI series with a back injury, with Molly Penfold replacing her in New Zealand's ODI squad. For the third ODI, Bernadine Bezuidenhout was ruled out due to an injury, with Eden Carson replaced her in the New Zealand's squad. Devine was also declared fit for the match, with Mikaela Greig added to the New Zealand's squad as cover.

== Tour matches ==
=== 1st 20-over match ===
10 March 2024
11:00
Scorecard

New Zealand; 125/6 (20 overs)	v	England A 110 (19 overs)
Suzie Bates 46 (32); Kirstie Gordon 2/26 (4 overs)		Freya Kemp 37 (27); Rosemary Mair 3/21 (3 overs)

New Zealand won by 15 runs
John Davies Oval, Queenstown
Umpires: James Blunt (NZ) and Tina Semmens (NZ)

- England A won the toss and elected to field.

=== 2nd 20-over match ===
12 March 2024
10:00
Scorecard

England A 126/7 (20 overs)	v	New Zealand; 127/4 (17.2 overs)
Grace Scrivens 49 (51); Hannah Rowe 3/25 (4 overs)		Bernadine Bezuidenhout 31 (27); Mady Villiers 2/16 (3 overs)

New Zealand won by 6 wickets
John Davies Oval, Queenstown
Umpires: Christelle High (NZ) and Tina Semmens (NZ)

- Toss uncontested.

== A team 20-over series ==
A Team 20-over series

=== 1st 20-over match ===
16 March 2024
13:00
Scorecard

England A 155/7 (20 overs)	v	New Zealand A 125/8 (20 overs)
Georgia Adams 65* (38); Molly Penfold 3/22 (4 overs)		Georgia Plimmer 34 (29); Ryana MacDonald-Gay 2/17 (4 overs)

England A won by 30 runs
John Davies Oval, Queenstown
Umpires: Christelle High (NZ) and Derek Walker (NZ)

- New Zealand A won the toss and elected to field.

=== 2nd 20-over match ===
17 March 2024
13:00
Scorecard

New Zealand A 130/4 (20 overs)	v	England A 132/2 (15.1 overs)
Kate Anderson 63* (57); Ryana MacDonald-Gay 3/25 (4 overs)		Grace Scrivens 57* (33); Hayley Jensen 1/18 (3 overs)

England A won by 8 wickets
John Davies Oval, Queenstown
Umpires: Kannan Jagannathan (NZ) and Derek Walker (NZ)

- New Zealand won the toss and elected to bat.

=== 3rd 20-over match ===
20 March 2024
13:00
Scorecard

England A 157/5 (20 overs)	v	New Zealand A 144/7 (20 overs)
Freya Kemp 60 (31); Hayley Jensen 2/24 (4 overs)		Prue Catton 28 (30); Tash Farrant 3/28 (4 overs)

England A won by 13 runs
John Davies Oval, Queenstown
Umpires: Neil Louw (NZ) and Derek Walker (NZ)

- England A won the toss and elected to bat.

== A team 50-over series ==
A Team 50-over series

=== 1st 50-over match ===
23 March 2024
11:00
Scorecard

New Zealand A 283 (48.1 overs)	v	England A 177 (40.1 overs)
Polly Inglis 46 (58); Mady Villiers 2/43 (10 overs)		Freya Kemp 45 (35); Hayley Jensen 4/26 (7 overs)

New Zealand A won by 106 runs
University Oval, Dunedin
Umpires: Neil Louw (NZ) and Tina Semmens (NZ)

- England A won the toss and elected to field.

=== 2nd 50-over match ===
28 March 2024
11:00
Scorecard

England A 334/5 (50 overs)	v	New Zealand A 251/9 (50 overs)
Hollie Armitage 120* (100); Eden Carson 1/47 (10 overs)		Prue Catton 70 (58); Ryana MacDonald-Gay 4/27 (8 overs)

England A won by 83 runs
Saxton Oval, Nelson
Umpires: Vinit Mahna (NZ) and Tina Semmens (NZ)

- New Zealand A won the toss and elected to field.

=== 3rd 50-over match ===
30 March 2024
11:00
Scorecard

New Zealand A 287/7 (50 overs)	v	England A 154 (38.4 overs)
Mikaela Greig 84 (85); Kirstie Gordon 3/38 (10 overs)		Rhianna Southby 45 (51); Molly Penfold 3/24 (9 overs)

New Zealand A won by 133 runs
Saxton Oval, Nelson
Umpires: Vinit Mahna (NZ) and Tina Semmens (NZ)

- New Zealand A won the toss and elected to bat.

== T20I series ==
=== 1st T20I ===
19 March 2024
13:00
Scorecard

England; 160/4 (20 overs)	v	New Zealand; 133/5 (20 overs)
Heather Knight 63 (39); Jess Kerr 1/26 (4 overs)		Suzie Bates 65 (51); Lauren Bell 2/29 (4 overs)

England won by 27 runs
University of Otago Oval, Dunedin
Umpires: Kim Cotton (NZ) and Eloise Sheridan (Aus)
Player of the match: Heather Knight (Eng)

- New Zealand won the toss and elected to field.
- Mikaela Greig (NZ) and Lauren Filer (Eng) both made their T20I debuts.
- Tammy Beaumont (Eng) played her 100th T20I.

=== 2nd T20I ===
22 March 2024
13:00
Scorecard

England; 149/7 (20 overs)	v	New Zealand; 134/8 (20 overs)
Heather Knight 56* (40); Rosemary Mair 2/25 (4 overs)		Amelia Kerr 44 (36); Lauren Bell 2/24 (4 overs)

England won by 15 runs
Saxton Oval, Nelson
Umpires: Kim Cotton (NZ) and Kannan Jagannathan (NZ)
Player of the match: Heather Knight (Eng)

- New Zealand won the toss and elected to field.

=== 3rd T20I ===
24 March 2024
13:00
Scorecard

New Zealand; 155/3 (20 overs)	v	England; 152/8 (20 overs)
Sophie Devine 60 (37); Danielle Gibson 2/22 (4 overs)		Maia Bouchier 71 (47); Suzie Bates 2/4 (1 over)

New Zealand won by 3 runs
Saxton Oval, Nelson
Umpires: Cory Black (NZ) and Eloise Sheridan (Aus)
Player of the match: Sophie Devine (NZ)

- New Zealand won the toss and elected to bat.
- Hollie Armitage made her T20I debut after replacing Sarah Glenn as a concussion substitute for England during the first innings.

=== 4th T20I ===
27 March 2024
13:00
Scorecard

England; 177/3 (20 overs)	v	New Zealand; 130/7 (20 overs)
Maia Bouchier 91 (56); Rosemary Mair 1/28 (4 overs)		Brooke Halliday 25 (23); Charlie Dean 4/26 (4 overs)

England won by 47 runs
Basin Reserve, Wellington
Umpires: Cory Black (NZ) and Chris Brown (NZ)
Player of the match: Maia Bouchier (Eng)

- New Zealand won the toss and elected to field.
- Maia Bouchier (Eng) registered the highest score in women's T20I score by a visiting player against New Zealand in New Zealand.
- Danni Wyatt became the leading run-scorer for England in women's T20Is, passing the previous record of 2,605 runs set by Charlotte Edwards.

=== 5th T20I ===
29 March 2024
13:00
Scorecard

New Zealand; 136/6 (20 overs)	v	England; 138/5 (18.5 overs)
Izzy Gaze 51* (28); Sophie Ecclestone 3/30 (4 overs)		Heather Knight 35 (28); Amelia Kerr 3/30 (4 overs)

England won by 5 wickets
Basin Reserve, Wellington
Umpires: Kim Cotton (NZ) and Eloise Sheridan (Aus)
Player of the match: Nat Sciver-Brunt (England)

- New Zealand won the toss and elected to bat.

== ODI series ==
=== 1st ODI ===
1 April 2024
11:00
Scorecard

New Zealand; 207 (48.2 overs)	v	England; 209/6 (41.2 overs)
Suzie Bates 50 (74); Lauren Bell 3/41 (9.2 overs)		Amy Jones 92* (83); Amelia Kerr 2/46 (10 overs)

England won by 4 wickets
Basin Reserve, Wellington
Umpires: Chris Brown (NZ) and Eloise Sheridan (Aus)
Player of the match: Amy Jones (Eng)

- England won the toss and elected to field.
- The partnership between Amy Jones and Charlie Dean was highest for seventh wicket or lower in women's ODIs (130*).
- Charlie Dean (Eng) became the fastest bowler to take 50 wickets in women's ODIs in terms of number of matches played (26).
- Amy Jones (Eng) scored the joint second highest score for a batter at number 7 or lower in women's ODIs (92*).
- Women's Championship points: England 2, New Zealand 0.

=== 2nd ODI ===
4 April 2024
11:00
Scorecard

England; 252 (49 overs)	v	New Zealand; 196 (45 overs)
Tammy Beaumont 81 (96); Suzie Bates 2/24 (4 overs)		Brooke Halliday 57 (90); Nat Sciver-Brunt 3/21 (7 overs)

England won by 56 runs
Seddon Park, Hamilton
Umpires: Chris Brown (NZ) and Kim Cotton (NZ)
Player of the match: Tammy Beaumont (Eng)

- England won the toss and elected to bat.
- Women's Championship points: England 2, New Zealand 0.

=== 3rd ODI ===
7 April 2024
11:00
Scorecard

England; 194 (46.3 overs)	v	New Zealand; 195/3 (39 overs)
Amy Jones 50 (52); Jess Kerr 3/39 (9.3 overs)		Sophie Devine 100* (93); Nat Sciver-Brunt 1/27 (7 overs)

New Zealand won by 7 wickets
Seddon Park, Hamilton
Umpires: Kim Cotton (NZ) and Eloise Sheridan (Aus)
Player of the match: Sophie Devine (NZ)

- England won the toss and elected to bat.
- Women's Championship points: New Zealand 2, England 0.
