= Sri Lanka women's cricket team in England in 2023 =

International cricket tour

	England	Sri Lanka
- Dates: 31 August 2023 – 14 September 2023
Captains	Heather Knight	Chamari Athapaththu

One Day International series
- Results: England won the 3-match series 2–0
Most runs	Nat Sciver-Brunt (122)	Hasini Perera (73)
Most wickets	Lauren Filer (8)	Kavisha Dilhari (4)
- Player of the series: Lauren Filer (Eng)

Twenty20 International series
- Results: Sri Lanka won the 3-match series 2–1
Most runs	Alice Capsey (63)	Chamari Athapaththu (114)
Most wickets	Sarah Glenn (2); Alice Capsey (2)	Kavisha Dilhari (5); Chamari Athapaththu (5)
- Player of the series: Chamari Athapaththu (SL)

The Sri Lanka women's cricket team toured England in August and September 2023 to play three One Day International (ODI) and three Twenty20 International (T20I) matches. The England and Wales Cricket Board (ECB) announced the dates of this series in September 2022, before revising the fixtures in May 2023 after women's cricket in the 2022 Asian Games was confirmed. The ODI series formed part of the 2022–2025 ICC Women's Championship tournament. The T20I series formed part of Sri Lanka's preparation for the Asian Games.

England won the rain-affected first match of the T20I series by 12 runs via the Duckworth–Lewis–Stern method. Sri Lanka won the second T20I by 8 wickets, which was their first win over England in the format. Sri Lanka later registered their maiden series victory over England, as they defeated England by 7 wickets in the third and final T20I.

In the first match of the ODI series, England defeated Sri Lanka by 7 wickets. The second ODI saw a delayed start because of rain, and was eventually abandoned after 30.5 overs of play in the first innings with Sri Lanka struggling at 106/9. England won the third ODI by 161 runs to take the series 2–0.

== Squads ==
England		Sri Lanka
ODIs	T20Is	ODIs and T20Is
Heather Knight (c); Tammy Beaumont (wk); ~~Lauren Bell~~; Maia Bouchier; Alice Capsey; Kate Cross; Alice Davidson-Richards; Charlie Dean; Lauren Filer; Mahika Gaur; Danielle Gibson; Sarah Glenn; Bess Heath (wk); Amy Jones (wk); Emma Lamb; Nat Sciver-Brunt	Heather Knight (c); ~~Lauren Bell~~; Maia Bouchier; Alice Capsey; Kate Cross; Charlie Dean; Lauren Filer; Mahika Gaur; Danielle Gibson; Sarah Glenn; Bess Heath (wk); Amy Jones (wk); Freya Kemp; Issy Wong; Danni Wyatt	Chamari Athapaththu (c); Oshadi Ranasinghe (vc); Nilakshi de Silva; Kavisha Dilhari; Imesha Dulani; Vishmi Gunaratne; Hansima Karunaratne; Kawya Kavindi; Achini Kulasuriya; Sugandika Kumari; Hasini Perera; Udeshika Prabodhani; Inoshi Priyadharshani; Inoka Ranaweera; Harshitha Samarawickrama; Anushka Sanjeewani (wk)

Lauren Bell missed the first two T20I matches due to illness and was ruled out of the rest of the series before the third T20I. Alice Davidson-Richards was called up as her replacement in England's squad for the final two ODI matches.

== Tour match ==
28 August 2023
Scorecard

England Development; 118/9 (20 overs)	v	Sri Lanka; 139/7 (20 overs)
Liberty Heap 30 (22); Kavisha Dilhari 2/8 (2 overs)		Chamari Athapaththu 44 (30); Grace Scrivens 3/27 (4 overs)

Sri Lanka won by 5 wickets
Arundel Castle Cricket Ground, Arundel
Umpires: Grace Bambury (Eng) and Rose Fernando (Eng)

- Sri Lanka won the toss and chose to field.
- Match continued after the target was reached.

Another match between the two teams on the same day was called off before the scheduled start of play.

== T20I series ==
=== 1st T20I ===
31 August 2023
18:00 (N)
Scorecard

England; 186/4 (17 overs)	v	Sri Lanka; 55/3 (6 overs)
Alice Capsey 51 (27); Kavisha Dilhari 1/18 (3 overs)		Nilakshi de Silva 18 (8); Charlie Dean 1/6 (1 over)

England won by 12 runs (DLS method)
County Ground, Hove
Umpires: Sue Redfern (Eng) and Rob White (Eng)
Player of the match: Alice Capsey (Eng)

- Sri Lanka won the toss and elected to field.
- The first innings and second innings were reduced to 17 overs and 6 overs respectively due to rain. Sri Lanka were set a revised target of 68 runs.
- Mahika Gaur made her T20I debut for England after previously playing T20Is for the United Arab Emirates, becoming the fifth women's cricketer to represent two international teams in T20Is.

=== 2nd T20I ===
2 September 2023
14:30
Scorecard

England; 104 (18 overs)	v	Sri Lanka; 110/2 (13.2 overs)
Charlie Dean 34 (26); Inoshi Priyadharshani 2/16 (4 overs)		Chamari Athapaththu 55 (31); Danielle Gibson 1/9 (1 over)

Sri Lanka won by 8 wickets
County Ground, Chelmsford
Umpires: Anna Harris (Eng) and Jasmine Naeem (Eng)
Player of the match: Chamari Athapaththu (SL)

- Sri Lanka won the toss and elected to field.

=== 3rd T20I ===
6 September 2023
18:00 (N)
Scorecard

England; 116 (19 overs)	v	Sri Lanka; 117/3 (17 overs)
Maia Bouchier 23 (18); Chamari Athapaththu 3/21 (4 overs)		Chamari Athapaththu 44 (28); Sarah Glenn 2/23 (4 overs)

Sri Lanka won by 7 wickets
County Ground, Derby
Umpires: Rob White (Eng) and Sue Redfern (Eng)
Player of the match: Chamari Athapaththu (SL)

- Sri Lanka won the toss and elected to field.

== ODI series ==
=== 1st ODI ===
9 September 2023
11:00
Scorecard

Sri Lanka; 106 (30.2 overs)	v	England; 107/3 (18 overs)
Harshitha Samarawickrama 35 (44); Sarah Glenn 3/20 (8 overs)		Tammy Beaumont 32 (31); Kavisha Dilhari 1/3 (1 over)

England won by 7 wickets
Riverside Ground, Chester-le-Street
Umpires: James Middlebrook (Eng) and Sue Redfern (Eng)
Player of the match: Mahika Gaur (Eng)

- England won the toss and elected to field.
- Maia Bouchier, Lauren Filer and Mahika Gaur (Eng) all made their ODI debuts.
- Women's Championship points: England 2, Sri Lanka 0.

=== 2nd ODI ===
12 September 2023
12:30
Scorecard

Sri Lanka; 106/9 (30.5 overs)	v	England
Chamari Athapaththu 34 (34); Charlie Dean 2/12 (7 overs)

No result
County Ground, Northampton
Umpires: Anna Harris (Eng) and Jasmine Naeem (Eng)

- England won the toss and elected to field.
- No further play was possible due to rain.
- Women's Championship points: England 1, Sri Lanka 1.

=== 3rd ODI ===
14 September 2023
12:30
Scorecard

England; 273/8 (31 overs)	v	Sri Lanka; 112 (24.5 overs)
Nat Sciver-Brunt 120 (74); Kavisha Dilhari 3/42 (4 overs)		Hasini Perera 32 (24); Charlie Dean 5/31 (6 overs)

England won by 161 runs
Grace Road, Leicester
Umpires: Anna Harris (Eng) and James Middlebrook (Eng)
Player of the match: Nat Sciver-Brunt (Eng)

- Sri Lanka won the toss and elected to field.
- The match was reduced to 31 overs per side due to rain.
- Bess Heath (Eng) made her ODI debut.
- Charlie Dean (Eng) took her first five-wicket haul in ODIs.
- Women's Championship Points: England 2, Sri Lanka 0.
