= New Zealand women's cricket team in England in 2024 =

International cricket tour

| | England | New Zealand |
- Dates: 26 June – 17 July 2024
| Captains | Heather Knight (Note: Nat Sciver-Brunt captained England in the third T20I.) | Sophie Devine |

One Day International series
- Results: England won the 3-match series 3–0
| Most runs | Maia Bouchier (186) | Amelia Kerr (110) |
| Most wickets | Sophie Ecclestone (7) | Brooke Halliday (3) |
- Player of the series: Maia Bouchier (Eng)

Twenty20 International series
- Results: England won the 5-match series 5–0
| Most runs | Alice Capsey (129) | Suzie Bates (117) |
| Most wickets | Sophie Ecclestone (8); Sarah Glenn (8) | Fran Jonas (6) |
- Player of the series: Sarah Glenn (Eng)

The New Zealand women's cricket team toured England in June and July 2024 to play three One Day International (ODI) and five Twenty20 International (T20I) matches against England. The T20I series formed part of both teams' preparation ahead of the 2024 ICC Women's T20 World Cup tournament. In July 2023, the England and Wales Cricket Board (ECB) confirmed the fixtures for the tour, as a part of the hosts' 2024 home international season.

== Squads ==
| England | | New Zealand | |
| ODIs | T20Is | ODIs | T20Is |
|---|---|---|---|
| Heather Knight (c); Tammy Beaumont; Lauren Bell; Maia Bouchier; Alice Capsey; Kate Cross; Charlie Dean; Sophia Dunkley; Sophie Ecclestone; Lauren Filer; Sarah Glenn; Amy Jones (wk); Ryana MacDonald-Gay; Nat Sciver-Brunt; Danni Wyatt | Heather Knight (c); Lauren Bell; Maia Bouchier; Alice Capsey; Charlie Dean; Sophia Dunkley; Sophie Ecclestone; Lauren Filer; Danielle Gibson; Sarah Glenn; Bess Heath (wk); Amy Jones (wk); Freya Kemp; Nat Sciver-Brunt; Linsey Smith; Danni Wyatt | Sophie Devine (c); Suzie Bates; Eden Carson; Lauren Down; Izzy Gaze (wk); Maddy Green; Mikaela Greig; Brooke Halliday; Fran Jonas; Amelia Kerr; Jess Kerr; Molly Penfold; Georgia Plimmer; Hannah Rowe | Sophie Devine (c); Suzie Bates; Eden Carson; Izzy Gaze (wk); Maddy Green; Mikaela Greig; Brooke Halliday; Fran Jonas; Leigh Kasperek; Amelia Kerr; Jess Kerr; Molly Penfold; Georgia Plimmer; Hannah Rowe; Lea Tahuhu |

== Tour match ==
21 June 2024
11:00
Scorecard

| New Zealand; 274/5 (50 overs) | v | ECB Development XI; 230 (43.2 overs) |
| Sophie Devine 55 (41); Fi Morris 2/38 (7 overs) | | Eva Gray 43 (60); Amelia Kerr 3/23 (6 overs) |

New Zealand won by 44 runs
Grace Road, Leicester
Umpires: Joanne Ibbotson (Eng) and Jasmine Naeem (Eng)

- New Zealand won the toss and elected to bat.

== ODI series ==
=== 1st ODI ===
26 June 2024
13:00 (D/N)
Scorecard

| New Zealand; 156 (33.3 overs) | v | England; 157/1 (21.2 overs) |
| Brooke Halliday 51 (60); Charlie Dean 4/38 (9 overs) | | Tammy Beaumont 76* (69); Brooke Halliday 1/17 (3.2 overs) |

England won by 9 wickets
Riverside Ground, Chester-le-Street
Umpires: Anna Harris (Eng) and Rob White (Eng)
Player of the match: Charlie Dean (Eng)

- New Zealand won the toss and elected to bat.
- Hannah Rowe (NZ) played in her 100th international match.
- Amelia Kerr (NZ) scored her 3,000th run in international cricket.

=== 2nd ODI ===
30 June 2024
11:00
Scorecard

| New Zealand; 141 (41.5 overs) | v | England; 142/2 (24.3 overs) |
| Amelia Kerr 43 (86); Sophie Ecclestone 5/25 (9 overs) | | Maia Bouchier 100* (88); Brooke Halliday 1/11 (2 overs) |

England won by 8 wickets
New Road, Worcester
Umpires: Jasmine Naeem (Eng) and Russell Warren (Eng)
Player of the match: Maia Bouchier (Eng)

- England won the toss and elected to field.
- Amelia Kerr (NZ) scored her 2,000th run in women's ODIs.
- Sophie Devine (NZ) scored her 7,000th run in international cricket.
- Maia Bouchier (Eng) scored her first century in women's ODIs.

=== 3rd ODI ===
3 July 2024
13:00 (D/N)
Scorecard

| New Zealand; 211/8 (42 overs) | v | England; 212/5 (38.4 overs) |
| Amelia Kerr 57 (42); Lauren Bell 5/37 (9 overs) | | Nat Sciver-Brunt 76* (84); Hannah Rowe 2/38 (9 overs) |

England won by 5 wickets
Bristol County Ground, Bristol
Umpires: Anna Harris (Eng) and Rob White (Eng)
Player of the match: Lauren Bell (Eng)

- England won the toss and elected to field.
- The match was reduced to 42 overs per side due to rain.
- Lauren Bell (Eng) took her first five-wicket haul in women's ODIs.

== T20I series ==
=== 1st T20I ===
6 July 2024
14:30
Scorecard

| England; 197/3 (20 overs) | v | New Zealand; 138 (20 overs) |
| Danni Wyatt 76 (51); Lea Tahuhu 2/34 (4 overs) | | Suzie Bates 43 (33); Sarah Glenn 3/16 (4 overs) |

England won by 59 runs
Rose Bowl, Southampton
Umpires: James Middlebrook (Eng) and Sue Redfern (Eng)
Player of the match: Danni Wyatt (Eng)

- New Zealand won the toss and elected to field.
- Amy Jones (Eng) played in her 200th international match.
- Charlie Dean (Eng) took her 100th wicket in international cricket.

=== 2nd T20I ===
9 July 2024
18:30 (N)
Scorecard

| England; 89/6 (9 overs) | v | New Zealand; 42/5 (6.4 overs) |
| Alice Capsey 28 (15); Lea Tahuhu 2/20 (2 overs) | | Brooke Halliday 14 (9); Charlie Dean 2/3 (1 over) |

England won by 23 runs (DLS method)
County Cricket Ground, Hove
Umpires: Anna Harris (Eng) and James Middlebrook (Eng)
Player of the match: Charlie Dean (Eng)

- New Zealand won the toss and elected to field.
- Rain initially reduced the match to 9 overs per side. Another rain delay prevented any further play.
- Heather Knight (Eng) scored her 2,000th run in women's T20Is.

=== 3rd T20I ===
11 July 2024
18:30 (N)
Scorecard

| New Zealand; 141/8 (20 overs) | v | England; 142/4 (19.2 overs) |
| Sophie Devine 58* (42); Sophie Ecclestone 4/25 (4 overs) | | Alice Capsey 67* (60); Fran Jonas 2/23 (4 overs) |

England won by 6 wickets
St Lawrence Ground, Canterbury
Umpires: James Middlebrook (Eng) and Sue Redfern (Eng)
Player of the match: Alice Capsey (Eng)

- England won the toss and elected to field.
- Suzie Bates (NZ) became the third women cricketer to score 10,000 runs in international cricket, and became most capped white-ball player in women's international cricket.

=== 4th T20I ===
13 July 2024
18:30 (N)
Scorecard

| New Zealand; 103/8 (20 overs) | v | England; 104/3 (11.3 overs) |
| Izzy Gaze 25 (24); Sarah Glenn 4/19 (4 overs) | | Sophia Dunkley 26 (16); Eden Carson 2/11 (2 overs) |

England won by 7 wickets
The Oval, London
Umpires: Anna Harris (Eng) and James Middlebrook (Eng)
Player of the match: Sarah Glenn (Eng)

- New Zealand won the toss and elected to bat.
- Maddy Green (NZ) scored her 1,000th run in women's T20Is.
- Sarah Glenn (Eng) took her 100th wicket in international cricket.

=== 5th T20I ===
17 July 2024
18:00 (N)
Scorecard

| England; 155/7 (20 overs) | v | New Zealand; 135/8 (20 overs) |
| Heather Knight 46* (31); Fran Jonas 4/22 (4 overs) | | Amelia Kerr 43 (36); Lauren Bell 3/21 (4 overs) |

England won by 20 runs
Lord's, London
Umpires: James Middlebrook (Eng) and Sue Redfern (Eng)
Player of the match: Heather Knight (Eng)

- New Zealand won the toss and elected to field.
