= 2023 The Hundred season =

Third season of The Hundred

- Dates: 1 – 27 August 2023
- Administrator: England and Wales Cricket Board
- Cricket format: 100-ball cricket
- Tournament format(s): Group stage and knockout
- Champions: W: Southern Brave (1st title); M: Oval Invincibles (1st title)
- Participants: W: 8 M: 8
- Matches: 68; W: 34; M: 34
- Player of the series: W: Marizanne Kapp (Oval Invincibles); M: Jamie Overton (Manchester Originals)
- Most runs: W: Danni Wyatt (Southern Brave) (295); M: Jos Buttler (Manchester Originals) (391)
- Most wickets: W: Georgia Adams (Southern Brave) (16); M: Tymal Mills (Southern Brave) (16)
- Official website: The Hundred

The 2023 The Hundred season was the third season of The Hundred, a professional franchise 100-ball cricket tournament involving eight men's and women's teams located in major cities across United Kingdom.

The women's Southern Brave and the men's Oval Invincibles won the trophy for the first time.

== Teams and venues ==
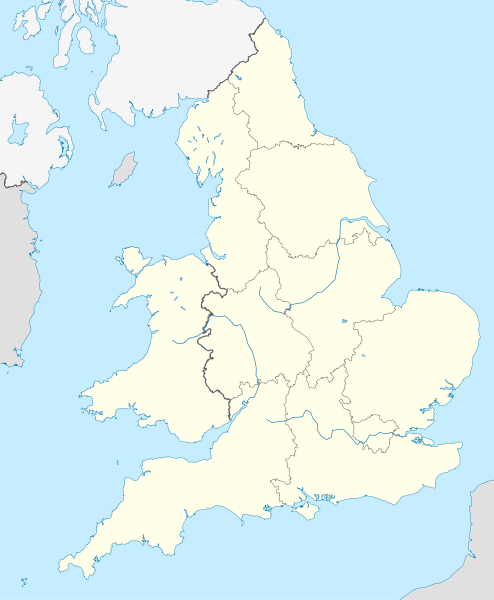
Venues in England and Wales

The eight teams that competed in the 2022 season returned for a third year.

| Team | Venue | Women's Coach | Men's Coach |
|---|---|---|---|
| Birmingham Phoenix | Edgbaston, Birmingham | Ben Sawyer | Daniel Vettori |
| London Spirit | Lord's, London | Ashley Noffke | Trevor Bayliss |
| Manchester Originals | Old Trafford, Manchester | Stephen Parry | Simon Katich |
| Northern Superchargers | Headingley, Leeds | Danielle Hazell | James Foster |
| Oval Invincibles | The Oval, London | Jonathan Batty | Tom Moody |
| Southern Brave | Rose Bowl, Southampton | Charlotte Edwards | Stephen Fleming |
| Trent Rockets | Trent Bridge, Nottingham | Jon Lewis | Andy Flower |
| Welsh Fire (Welsh: Tân Cymreig) | Sophia Gardens, Cardiff | Gareth Breese | Michael Hussey |

== Background ==
=== Draft and Retention ===
As in previous editions, eight city-based teams competed for both the men's and women's titles over a month, from 1 August to 27 August 2023. Teams were selected through the draft and retention system, which allowed franchises to retain key players from previous seasons while filling remaining slots through the draft.

=== Salaries and Prize Money ===
Salaries for male and female competitors were frozen at 2022 levels. Men earned between £30,000 and £125,000, while women earned between £7,500 and £31,250.

The total prize fund was £600,000. Each winning team received £150,000, the runner-up £75,000, and the remaining amount was distributed among players as individual awards.

=== Format ===
The group stage consisted of 64 matches (32 men's and 32 women's), with all matches held on the same day at the same grounds, accessible with a single ticket. Each team played four matches at home and four away, facing every other team once, plus a bonus match against their nearest regional rival.

After the league stage, the top three teams advanced to the knockout stage. The second- and third-placed teams played a semi-final at The Oval in London, with the winner progressing to meet the first-placed team in the final at Lord's.

| Semifinal | Final |
| | First-placed team |
| Second-placed team | Winner of semi-final |
| Third-placed team |

== Draft ==
=== Women ===
For the first time, in 2023, a women's draft was also implemented. This was the first time such a draft had ever taken place in any major women's UK sporting event.

| Price | Birmingham Phoenix | London Spirit | Manchester Originals | Northern Superchargers | Oval Invincibles | Southern Brave | Trent Rockets | Welsh Fire |
|---|---|---|---|---|---|---|---|---|
| £31.25k | Sophie Devine | Grace Harris | Laura Wolvaardt | Kate Cross | Suzie Bates | Danni Wyatt-Hodge | Harmanpreet Kaur | Sophia Dunkley |
| £31.25k | Amy Jones | Heather Knight | Sophie Ecclestone | Alyssa Healy | Marizanne Kapp | Smriti Mandhana | Nat Sciver-Brunt | Shabnim Ismail |
| £25k | Ellyse Perry | Sarah Glenn | Amanda-Jade Wellington | Georgia Wareham | Alice Capsey | Anya Shrubsole | Katherine Sciver-Brunt | Tammy Beaumont |
| £25k | Issy Wong | Amelia Kerr | Deandra Dottin | Heather Graham | Lauren Winfield-Hill | Chloe Tryon | Alana King | Hayley Matthews |
| £18.75k | Hannah Baker | Sophie Munro | Kathryn Bryce | Alice Davidson-Richards | Dane van Niekerk | Maitlan Brown | Lizelle Lee | Georgia Elwiss |
| £18.75k | Eve Jones | Charlie Dean | Emma Lamb | Linsey Smith | Tash Farrant | Lauren Bell | Bryony Smith | Freya Davies |
| £15k | Katie Levick | Sophie Luff | Katie George | Hollie Armitage | Mady Villiers | Maia Bouchier | Kirstie Gordon | Laura Harris |
| £15k | Emily Arlott | Dani Gibson | Ellie Threlkeld | Bess Heath | Paige Scholfield | Freya Kemp | Grace Potts | Alex Hartley |
| £12.5k | Erin Burns | Richa Ghosh | Ami Campbell | Marie Kelly | Ryana MacDonald-Gay | Georgia Adams | Jo Gardner | Claire Nicholas |
| £12.5k | Abtaha Maqsood | Grace Scrivens | Fi Morris | Aylish Cranstone | Sophia Smale | Kalea Moore | Fran Wilson | Sarah Bryce |
| £10k | Davina Perrin | Tara Norris | Phoebe Graham | Georgie Boyce | Cordelia Griffith | Rhianna Southby | Alexa Stonehouse | Emily Windsor |
| £10k | Abbey Freeborn | Lauren Filer | Amara Carr | Lucy Higham | Hannah Rainey | Dani Gregory | Naomi Dattani | Ella McCaughan |
| £7.5k | Charis Pavely | Niamh Holland | Liberty Heap | Leah Dobson | Kira Chathli | Seren Smale | Josie Groves | Alex Griffiths |
| £7.5k | Sterre Kalis | Chloe Hill | Mahika Gaur | Grace Ballinger | Claudie Cooper | Ellie Anderson | Nat Wraith | Chloe Skelton |
| £7.5k | Chloe Brewer | Alice Monaghan | Laura Jackson | Grace Hall | Lizzie Scott | Mary Taylor | Cassidy McCarthy | Kate Coppack |

=== Men ===
Men's teams were allowed to retain up to ten of the previous season's men's players by negotiating new contracts directly with players until the retention window closed.

A player draft then took place in May to fill the forty-two remaining squad players, with teams taking turns to sign available players in vacant salary bands. Picks were in reverse order of where a team finished in the previous season, beginning with London Spirit and ending with Southern Brave.

The ECB announced that the availability of players who played in the 2023 Ashes series would be assessed at the end of the series.

| Price | Birmingham Phoenix | London Spirit | Manchester Originals | Northern Superchargers | Oval Invincibles | Southern Brave | Trent Rockets | Welsh Fire |
|---|---|---|---|---|---|---|---|---|
| Central | Chris Woakes | Mark Wood | Jos Buttler | Ben Stokes | Sam Curran | Jofra Archer | Joe Root | Jonny Bairstow |
| £125k | Ben Duckett | Mitch Marsh | Wanindu Hasaranga | Adil Rashid | Sunil Narine | Leus du Plooy | Tom Kohler-Cadmore | Tom Abell |
| £125k | Liam Livingstone | Glenn Maxwell | Phil Salt | Harry Brook | Will Jacks | Tim David | Rashid Khan | David Willey |
| £100k | Moeen Ali | Olly Stone | Laurie Evans | Reece Topley | Jason Roy | James Vince | Dawid Malan | Shaheen Shah Afridi |
| £100k | Shadab Khan | Nathan Ellis | Ashton Turner | Tom Banton | Tom Curran | Chris Jordan | Alex Hales | Joe Clarke |
| £75k | Adam Milne | Liam Dawson | Jamie Overton | Michael Bracewell | Sam Billings | Devon Conway | Lewis Gregory | Glenn Phillips |
| £75k | Benny Howell | Dan Lawrence | Tom Hartley | Adam Lyth | Saqib Mahmood | Tymal Mills | Luke Wood | Ollie Pope |
| £60k | Will Smeed | Zak Crawley | Richard Gleeson | Adam Hose | Heinrich Klaasen | Rehan Ahmed | Colin Munro | Haris Rauf |
| £60k | Kane Richardson | Jordan Thompson | Paul Walter | Brydon Carse | Ross Whiteley | Craig Overton | Sam Cook | David Payne |
| £50k | Jamie Smith | Mason Crane | Josh Tongue | Matty Potts | Jordan Cox | Finn Allen | Daniel Sams | Roelof van der Merwe |
| £50k | Tom Helm | Adam Rossington | Josh Little | David Wiese | Gus Atkinson | George Garton | Samit Patel | Jake Ball |
| £40k | Miles Hammond | Chris Wood | Wayne Madsen | Bas de Leede | Ihsan Ullah | James Fuller | Sam Hain | Stevie Eskinazi |
| £40k | Chris Benjamin | Ravi Bopara | Tom Lammonby | Wayne Parnell | Danny Briggs | Alex Davies | Brad Wheal | Dan Douthwaite |
| £30k | Dan Mousley | Michael Pepper | Mitchell Stanley | Callum Parkinson | Nathan Sowter | Joe Weatherley | Matt Carter | George Scrimshaw |
| Wildcard (£30k) | Jacob Bethell | Matt Critchley | Max Holden | Ollie Robinson | Tawanda Muyeye | Matthew Fisher | John Turner | Luke Wells |
| Wildcard (£30k) | Henry Brookes | Daniel Bell-Drummond | Fred Klaassen | Saif Zaib | Zak Chappell | Jafer Chohan | Tom Moores | Chris Cooke |

== Broadcasting ==
Sky Sports showed every match in the competition live on its subscription television service, while the BBC also broadcast some matches live on free-to-air television and broadcast commentary on its radio services.

== Standings ==
=== Women ===
| Pos | Team | Pld | W | L | T | NR | Pts | NRR |
|---|---|---|---|---|---|---|---|---|
| 1 | Southern Brave (C) | 8 | 7 | 1 | 0 | 0 | 14 | 0.681 |
| 2 | Northern Superchargers | 8 | 6 | 2 | 0 | 0 | 12 | 0.357 |
| 3 | Welsh Fire | 8 | 5 | 2 | 0 | 1 | 11 | 0.602 |
| 4 | Trent Rockets | 8 | 3 | 4 | 0 | 1 | 7 | −0.003 |
| 5 | Oval Invincibles | 8 | 3 | 4 | 0 | 1 | 7 | −0.366 |
| 6 | London Spirit | 8 | 2 | 4 | 0 | 2 | 6 | 0.341 |
| 7 | Manchester Originals | 8 | 2 | 4 | 0 | 2 | 6 | −0.778 |
| 8 | Birmingham Phoenix | 8 | 0 | 7 | 0 | 1 | 1 | −0.923 |

Source: BBC Sport, ESPN Cricinfo
(C) Champions

advanced to Final
advanced to the Eliminator

=== Men ===
| Pos | Team | Pld | W | L | T | NR | Pts | NRR |
|---|---|---|---|---|---|---|---|---|
| 1 | Oval Invincibles (C) | 8 | 6 | 1 | 1 | 0 | 13 | 0.563 |
| 2 | Manchester Originals | 8 | 4 | 3 | 0 | 1 | 9 | 0.521 |
| 3 | Southern Brave | 8 | 4 | 3 | 0 | 1 | 9 | 0.061 |
| 4 | Welsh Fire | 8 | 4 | 3 | 1 | 0 | 9 | −0.055 |
| 5 | Trent Rockets | 8 | 3 | 4 | 0 | 1 | 7 | 0.184 |
| 6 | Birmingham Phoenix | 8 | 2 | 4 | 0 | 2 | 6 | −0.087 |
| 7 | London Spirit | 8 | 2 | 4 | 0 | 2 | 6 | −0.658 |
| 8 | Northern Superchargers | 8 | 2 | 5 | 0 | 1 | 5 | −0.707 |

Source: BBC Sport, ESPNcricinfo
(C) Champions

advanced to Final
advanced to the Eliminator

== Results ==
=== Women ===
1 August 2023
15:00
Scorecard

| Southern Brave; 157/6 (100 balls) | v | Trent Rockets; 130/7 (100 balls) |
| Smriti Mandhana 55 (36); Bryony Smith 2/34 (20 balls) | | Nat Sciver-Brunt 49 (31); Mary Taylor 3/18 (20 balls) |

Southern Brave won by 27 runs
Trent Bridge, Nottingham
Umpires: Anna Harris (Eng) and Jasmine Naeem (Eng)
Player of the match: Smriti Mandhana (Southern Brave)

- Trent Rockets won the toss and elected to field.
- Points: Southern Brave 2, Trent Rockets 0.

2 August 2023
11:30
Scorecard

| Welsh Fire | v | Manchester Originals |

Match abandoned
Sophia Gardens, Cardiff
Umpires: Hassan Adnan (Eng) and Anna Harris (Eng)

- No toss.
- No play was possible due to rain.
- Points: Welsh Fire 1, Manchester Originals 1.

2 August 2023
15:00
Scorecard

| London Spirit | v | Oval Invincibles |

Match abandoned
Lord's, London
Umpires: James Middlebrook (Eng) and Jasmine Naeem (Eng)

- No toss.
- No play was possible due to rain.
- Points: London Spirit 1, Oval Invincibles 1.

3 August 2023
15:00
Scorecard

| Birmingham Phoenix; 110/8 (100 balls) | v | Northern Superchargers; 112/3 (78 balls) |
| Sophie Devine 46 (36); Alice Davidson-Richards 3/20 (20 balls) | | Phoebe Litchfield 42* (29); Issy Wong 1/9 (5 balls) |

Northern Superchargers won by 7 wickets
Headingley, Leeds
Umpires: Neil Pratt (Eng) and Sophie McLelland (Eng)
Player of the match: Alice Davidson-Richards (Northern Superchargers)

- Northern Superchargers won the toss and elected to field.
- Points: Northern Superchargers 2, Birmingham Phoenix 0.

4 August 2023
15:00
Scorecard

| Welsh Fire; 165/3 (100 balls) | v | Southern Brave; 161/4 (100 balls) |
| Hayley Matthews 65 (38); Chloe Tyron 1/28 (20 balls) | | Smriti Mandhana 70* (42); Alex Griffiths 2/26 (20 balls) |

Welsh Fire won by 4 runs
Rose Bowl, Southampton
Umpires: Anna Harris (Eng) and Tom Lungley (Eng)
Player of the match: Hayley Matthews (Welsh Fire)

- Southern Brave won the toss and elected to field.
- Points: Welsh Fire 2, Southern Brave 0.

5 August 2023
11:00
Scorecard

| Manchester Originals | v | London Spirit |

Match abandoned
Old Trafford, Manchester
Umpires: Hassan Adnan (Eng) and Jasmine Naeem (Eng)

- No toss.
- No play was possible due to rain.
- Points: Manchester Originals 1, London Spirit 1.

5 August 2023
14:30
Scorecard

| Birmingham Phoenix | v | Trent Rockets |

Match abandoned
Edgbaston, Birmingham
Umpires: Joanne Ibbotson (Eng) and Neil Pratt (Eng)

- No toss.
- No play was possible due to rain.
- Points: Birmingham Phoenix 1, Trent Rockets 1.

6 August 2023
11:00
Scorecard

| Southern Brave; 102/5 (100 balls) | v | Northern Superchargers; 100/8 (100 balls) |
| Maia Bouchier 31 (28); Linsey Smith 2/11 (20 balls) | | Marie Kelly 39 (40); Georgia Adams 3/21 (20 balls) |

Southern Brave won by 5 wickets
Rose Bowl, Southampton
Umpires: Mark Newell (Eng) and Sophie McLelland (Eng)
Player of the match: Rhianna Southby (Southern Brave)

- Southern Brave won the toss and elected to field.
- Points: Southern Brave 2, Northern Superchargers 0.

6 August 2023
14:30
Scorecard

| Oval Invincibles; 80 (98 balls) | v | Welsh Fire; 81/7 (80 balls) |
| Lauren Winfield-Hill 42 (35); Shabnim Ismail 3/12 (20 balls) | | Georgia Elwiss 33 (29); Marizanne Kapp 4/18 (20 balls) |

Welsh Fire won by 3 wickets
The Oval, London
Umpires: Lubabalo Gcuma (SA) and James Middlebrook (Eng)
Player of the match: Shabnim Ismail (Welsh Fire)

- Welsh Fire won the toss and elected to field.
- Points: Welsh Fire 2, Oval Invincibles 0.

7 August 2023
15:00
Scorecard

| Birmingham Phoenix; 87 (96 balls) | v | Manchester Originals; 91/5 (99 balls) |
| Sophie Devine 27 (25); Fi Morris 5/7 (16 balls) | | Laura Wolvaardt 38 (34); Katie Levick 2/12 (20 balls) |

Manchester Originals won by 5 wickets
Old Trafford, Manchester
Umpires: Naeem Ashraf (Eng) and Jasmine Naeem (Eng)
Player of the match: Fi Morris (Manchester Originals)

- Manchester Originals won the toss and elected to field.
- Points: Manchester Originals 2, Birmingham Phoenix 0.

8 August 2023
15:00
Scorecard

| London Spirit; 104/5 (85 balls) | v | Southern Brave; 108/5 (82 balls) |
| Heather Knight 44 (27); Georgia Adams 4/11 (20 balls) | | Maia Bouchier 63* (42); Sarah Glenn 3/15 (20 balls) |

Southern Brave won by 5 wickets
Lord's, London
Umpires: Tom Lungley (Eng) and Sophie McLelland (Eng)
Player of the match: Maia Bouchier (Southern Brave)

- Southern Brave won the toss and elected to field.
- The match was reduced to 85 balls per side due to rain.
- Points: Southern Brave 2, London Spirits 0.

9 August 2023
11:30
Scorecard

| Northern Superchargers; 134/4 (100 balls) | v | Trent Rockets; 125/7 (100 balls) |
| Phoebe Litchfield 38 (27); Alexa Stonehouse 1/10 (10 balls) | | Bryony Smith 70 (44); Lucy Higham 3/29 (20 balls) |

Northern Superchargers won by 9 runs
Trent Bridge, Nottingham
Umpires: Naeem Ashraf (Eng) and Sue Redfern (Eng)
Player of the match: Lucy Higham (Northern Superchargers)

- Northern Superchargers won the toss and elected to bat.
- Points: Northern Superchargers 2, Trent Rockets 0.

9 August 2023
15:00
Scorecard

| Oval Invincibles; 128/7 (100 balls) | v | Manchester Originals; 123/9 (100 balls) |
| Alice Capsey 50 (41); Mahika Gaur 1/13 (20 balls) | | Deandra Dottin 42 (26); Ryana MacDonald-Gay 4/16 (20 balls) |

Oval Invincibles won by 5 runs
The Oval, London
Umpires: Jack Shantry (Eng) and Sophie McLelland (Eng)
Player of the match: Ryana MacDonald-Gay (Oval Invincibles)

- Manchester Originals won the toss and elected to field.
- Points: Oval Invincibles 2, Manchester Originals 0.

10 August 2023
15:00
Scorecard

| Birmingham Phoenix; 134/4 (100 balls) | v | Welsh Fire; 137/7 (100 balls) |
| Tess Flintoff 55 (45); Shabnim Ismail 3/31 (20 balls) | | Tammy Beaumont 59 (40); Hannah Baker 2/21 (20 balls) |

Welsh Fire win by 3 runs
Edgbaston, Birmingham
Umpires: Grace Bambury (Eng) and James Middlebrook (Eng)
Player of the match: Shabnim Ismail (Welsh Fire)

- Birmingham Phoenix won the toss and elected to field.
- Points: Welsh Fire 2, Birmingham Phoenix 0.
- Shabnim Ismail took a hat-trick.

11 August 2023
15:00
Scorecard

| Northern Superchargers; 143/4 (100 balls) | v | Oval Invincibles; 129/5 (100 balls) |
| Phoebe Litchfield 68 (45); Marizanne Kapp 2/22 (20 balls) | | Cordelia Griffith 30* (15); Georgia Wareham 2/20 (20 balls) |

Northern Superchargers won by 14 runs
Headingley, Leeds
Umpires: Joanne Ibbotson (Eng) and Neil Pratt (Eng)
Player of the match: Phoebe Litchfield (Northern Superchargers)

- Northern Superchargers won the toss and elected to bat first.
- Points: Northern Superchargers 2, Oval Invincibles 0.

12 August 2023
11:00
Scorecard

| London Spirit; 124/4 (100 balls) | v | Trent Rockets; 127/5 (86 balls) |
| Danielle Gibson 36 (27); Kirstie Gordon 2/19 (20) | | Nat Sciver-Brunt 81 (41); Sarah Glenn 2/19 (20) |

Trent Rockets won by 5 wickets
Lord's, London
Umpires: Ben Debenham (Eng) and Jasmine Naeem (Eng)
Player of the match: Nat Sciver-Brunt (Trent Rockets)

- Trent Rockets won the toss and elected to field first.
- Points: Trent Rockets 2, London Spirit 0.

12 August 2023
14:30
Scorecard

| Welsh Fire; 144/5 (100 balls) | v | Southern Brave; 145/8 (100 balls) |
| Sophia Dunkley 50 (33); Georgia Adams 2/22 (20 balls) | | Maia Bouchier 42 (26); Shabnim Ismail 2/19 (20 balls) |

Southern Brave won by 2 wickets
Sophia Gardens, Cardiff
Umpires: Rose Dovey (Eng) and Rob White (Eng)
Player of the match: Georgia Adams (Southern Brave)

- Southern Brave won the toss and elected to field.
- Points: Southern Brave 2, Welsh Fire 0.

13 August 2023
11:00
Scorecard

| Northern Superchargers; 133/5 (100 balls) | v | Manchester Originals; 108/7 (80 balls) |
| Phoebe Litchfield 39 (29); Sophie Ecclestone 1/17 (20 balls) | | Emma Lamb 49 (36); Alice Davidson-Richards 3/23 (15 balls) |

Northern Superchargers won by 4 runs (DLS method)
Headingley, Leeds
Umpires: Jasmine Naeem (Eng) and Neil Pratt (Eng)
Player of the match: Alice Davidson-Richards (Northern Superchargers)

- Northern Superchargers won the toss and elected to bat.
- Manchester Originals were set a revised target of 113 runs from 80 balls due to rain.
- Points: Northern Superchargers 2, Manchester Originals 0.

13 August 2023
14:30
Scorecard

| Oval Invincibles; 142/5 (100 balls) | v | Birmingham Phoenix; 132/6 (100 balls) |
| Marizanne Kapp 64* (40); Katie Levick 2/19 (20 balls) | | Sophie Devine 53 (34); Paige Scholfield 3/30 (20 balls) |

Oval Invincibles won by 10 runs
Edgbaston, Birmingham
Umpires: Sue Redfern (Eng) and Jack Shantry (Eng)
Player of the match: Marizanne Kapp (Oval Invincibles)

- Birmingham Phoenix won the toss and elected to field.
- Points: Oval Invincibles 2, Birmingham Phoenix 0.

14 August 2023
15:00
Scorecard

| Welsh Fire; 181/3 (100 balls) | v | Trent Rockets; 140/5 (100 balls) |
| Tammy Beaumont 118 (61); Kirstie Gordon 2/27 (20 balls) | | Bryony Smith 48 (21); Freya Davies 2/19 (20 balls) |

Welsh Fire won by 41 runs
Sophia Gardens, Cardiff
Umpires: Grace Bambury (Eng) and Mark Newell (Eng)
Player of the match: Tammy Beaumont (Welsh Fire)

- Welsh Fire won the toss and elected to bat.
- Points: Welsh Fire 2, Trent Rockets 0.

15 August 2023
15:00
Scorecard

| London Spirit; 118/9 (100 balls) | v | Oval Invincibles; 97 (100 balls) |
| Danielle Gibson 22 (14); Marizanne Kapp 2/13 (20 balls) | | Marizanne Kapp 30 (24); Amelia Kerr 3/16 (20 balls) |

London Spirit won by 21 runs
The Oval, London
Umpires: Neil Bainton (Eng) and Sue Redfern (Eng)
Player of the match: Tara Norris (London Spirit)

- Oval Invincibles won the toss and elected to field.
- Points: London Spirit 2, Oval Invincibles 0.

16 August 2023
15:00
Scorecard

| Southern Brave; 132/4 (100 balls) | v | Birmingham Phoenix; 129/8 (100 balls) |
| Danni Wyatt 43 (33); Emily Arlott 2/22 (15 balls) | | Amy Jones 33 (23); Georgia Adams 2/25 (20 balls) |

Southern Brave won by 3 runs
Rose Bowl, Southampton
Umpires: Ian Blackwell (Eng) and Rose Dovey (SL)
Player of the match: Danni Wyatt (Southern Brave)

- Southern Brave won the toss and elected to bat.
- Points: Southern Brave 2, Birmingham Phoenix 0.

17 August 2023
15:00
Scorecard

| Manchester Originals; 107/5 (100 balls) | v | Trent Rockets; 110/1 (64 balls) |
| Deandra Dottin 30 (26); Kirstie Gordon 1/18 (20 balls) | | Lizelle Lee 44* (27); Sophie Ecclestone 1/34 (19 balls) |

Trent Rockets won by 9 wickets
Trent Bridge, Nottingham
Umpires: Neil Bainton (Eng) and Anna Harris (Eng)
Player of the match: Bryony Smith (Trent Rockets)

- Manchester Originals won the toss and elected to bat .
- Points: Trent Rockets 2, Manchester Originals 0.

18 August 2023
15:00
Scorecard

| London Spirit; 135/7 (100 balls) | v | Northern Superchargers; 136/6 (99 balls) |
| Amelia Kerr 60* (32); Lucy Higham 1/14 (10 balls) | | Phoebe Litchfield 38 (34); Sarah Glenn 3/19 (20 balls) |

Northern Superchargers won by 4 wickets
Lord's, London
Umpires: Sue Redfern (Eng) and Surendiran Shanmugam (Eng)
Player of the match: Phoebe Litchfield (Northern Superchargers)

- Northern Superchargers won the toss and elected to field.
- Points: Northern Superchargers 2, London Spirit 0.

19 August 2023
11:00
Scorecard

| Trent Rockets; 134/6 (100 balls) | v | Birmingham Phoenix; 131/4 (100 balls) |
| Bryony Smith 64 (40); Emily Arlott 3/15 (20 balls) | | Amy Jones 46* (30); Kirstie Gordon 1/20 (20 balls) |

Trent Rockets won by 3 runs
Trent Bridge, Nottingham
Umpires: Grace Bambury (Eng) and Tom Lungley (Eng)
Player of the match: Bryony Smith (Trent Rockets)

- Trent Rockets won the toss and elected to bat.
- Points: Trent Rockets 2, Birmingham Phoenix 0.

19 August 2023
14:30
Scorecard

| Oval Invincibles; 130/6 (100 balls) | v | Southern Brave; 132/3 (96 balls) |
| Suzie Bates 55 (46); Maitlan Brown 1/8 (5 balls) | | Georgia Adams 50* (32); Marizanne Kapp 1/18 (20 balls) |

Southern Brave won by 7 wickets
Rose Bowl, Southampton
Umpires: Anthony Harris (Eng) and Sophie McLelland (Eng)
Player of the match: Georgia Adams (Southern Brave)

- Oval Invincibles won the toss and elected to bat.
- Points: Southern Brave 2, Oval Invincibles 0.

20 August 2023
11:00
Scorecard

| Northern Superchargers; 107/8 (100 balls) | v | Manchester Originals; 108/7 (99 balls) |
| Hollie Armitage 46 (43); Amanda-Jade Wellington 2/17 (20 balls) | | Amanda-Jade Wellington 33* (26); Georgia Wareham 3/7 (20 balls) |

Manchester Originals won by 3 wickets
Old Trafford, Manchester
Umpires: Richard Kettleborough (Eng) and Jasmine Naeem (Eng)
Player of the match: Kathryn Bryce (Manchester Originals)

- Northern Superchargers won the toss and elected to bat.
- Points: Manchester Originals 2, Northern Superchargers 0.

20 August 2023
14:30
Scorecard

| Welsh Fire; 161/4 (100 balls) | v | London Spirit; 138/7 (100 balls) |
| Sophia Dunkley 68 (48); Sophie Munro 2/24 (15 balls) | | Richa Ghosh 34 (26); Sophia Dunkley 2/15 (15 balls) |

Welsh Fire won by 23 runs
Sophia Gardens, Cardiff
Umpires: Anna Harris (Eng) and Surendiran Shanmugam (Eng)
Player of the match: Sophia Dunkley (Welsh Fire)

- London Spirit won the toss and elected to field.
- Points: Welsh Fire 2, London Spirit 0.

21 August 2023
15:00
Scorecard

| Oval Invincibles; 156/6 (100 balls) | v | Trent Rockets; 152/8 (100 balls) |
| Nadine de Klerk 51* (25); Kirstie Gordon 2/19 (20 balls) | | Lizelle Lee 61 (33); Sophia Smale 2/26 (20 balls) |

Oval Invincibles won by 3 runs
The Oval, London
Umpires: Anthony Harris (Eng) and Sophie McLelland (Eng)
Player of the match: Nadine de Klerk (Oval Invincibles)

- Oval Invincibles won the toss and elected to bat.
- Points: Oval Invincibles 2, Trent Rockets 0.

22 August 2023
15:00
Scorecard

| Northern Superchargers; 144/4 (100 balls) | v | Welsh Fire; 128/8 (100 balls) |
| Marie Kelly 69* (46); Sophia Dunkley 1/14 (10 balls) | | Laura Harris 37 (20); Kate Cross 2/19 (20 balls) |

Northern Superchargers won by 16 runs
Headingley, Leeds
Umpires: Paul Baldwin (Eng) and Martin Saggers (Eng)
Player of the match: Marie Kelly (Northern Superchargers)

- Northern Superchargers won the toss and elected to bat.
- Points: Northern Superchargers 2, Welsh Fire 0.

23 August 2023
15:00
Scorecard

| Manchester Originals; 118/4 (100 balls) | v | Southern Brave; 121/2 (72 balls) |
| Fi Morris 50 (39); Anya Shrubsole 2/33 (20 balls) | | Danni Wyatt 60 (32); Kathryn Bryce 1/20 (17 balls) |

Southern Brave won by 8 wickets
Old Trafford, Manchester
Umpires: Hassan Adnan (Eng) and Sue Redfern (Eng)
Player of the match: Danni Wyatt (Southern Brave)

- Southern Brave won the toss and elected to field.
- Points: Southern Brave 2, Manchester Originals 0.

24 August 2023
15:00
Scorecard

| London Spirit; 172/5 (100 balls) | v | Birmingham Phoenix; 99 (76 balls) |
| Grace Harris 87 (47); Erin Burns 1/26 (15 balls) | | Sterre Kalis 28 (16); Amelia Kerr 4/13 (16 balls) |

London Spirit won by 73 runs
Edgbaston, Birmingham
Umpires: Sophie McLelland (Eng) and Surendiran Shanmugam (Eng)
Player of the match: Grace Harris (London Spirit)

- Birmingham Phoenix won the toss and elected to field.
- Points: London Spirit 2, Birmingham Phoenix 0.

=== Men ===
1 August 2023
18:30 (N)
Scorecard

| Trent Rockets; 133/8 (100 balls) | v | Southern Brave; 127 (99 balls) |
| Sam Hain 63 (39); Chris Jordan 3/18 (20 balls) | | Leus du Plooy 29 (19); Lewis Gregory 3/19 (15 balls) |

Trent Rockets won by 6 runs
Trent Bridge, Nottingham
Attendance: 12,402
Umpires: Martin Saggers (Eng) and Russell Warren (Eng)
Player of the match: Sam Hain (Trent Rockets)

- Southern Brave won the toss and elected to field.
- Points: Trent Rockets 2, Southern Brave 0.

2 August 2023
15:00
Scorecard

| Welsh Fire; 94/3 (40 balls) | v | Manchester Originals; 85/4 (40 balls) |
| Luke Wells 57 (23); Josh Little 2/22 (10 balls) | | Jos Buttler 37* (18); David Willey 2/17 (10 balls) |

Welsh Fire won by 9 runs
Sophia Gardens, Cardiff
Umpires: Ian Blackwell (Eng) and Ben Debenham (Eng)
Player of the match: Luke Wells (Welsh Fire)

- Manchester Originals won the toss and elected to field.
- The match was reduced to 40 balls per side due to rain.
- Points: Welsh Fire 2, Manchester Originals 0.

2 August 2023
18:30 (N)
Scorecard

| London Spirit; 131 (100 balls) | v | Oval Invincibles; 132/7 (99 balls) |
| Adam Rossington 39 (21); Nathan Sowter 3/34 (20 balls) | | Sam Curran 34 (28); Daniel Worrall 2/23 (20 balls); Jordan Thompson 2/23 (20 balls) |

Oval Invincibles won by 3 wickets
Lord's, London
Umpires: Mike Burns (Eng) and Graham Lloyd (Eng)
Player of the match: Sunil Narine (Oval Invincibles)

- Oval Invincibles won the toss and elected to field.
- Points: Oval Invincibles 2, London Spirit 0.

3 August 2023
18:30 (N)
Scorecard

| Birmingham Phoenix; 84/5 (62 balls) | v | Northern Superchargers |
| Ben Duckett 34* (26); Matthew Short 2/9 (10 balls) |

No result
Headingley, Leeds
Umpires: Richard Kettleborough (Eng) and Russell Warren (Eng)

- Northern Superchargers won the toss and elected to field.
- No further play was possible due to rain.
- Points: Birmingham Phoenix 1, Northern Superchargers 1.

4 August 2023
18:30 (N)
Scorecard

| Southern Brave; 147/8 (100 balls) | v | Welsh Fire; 145/7 (100 balls) |
| Chris Jordan 70* (32); Haris Rauf 3/27 (20 balls) | | Stephen Eskinazi 31 (18); Tymal Mills 2/23 (20 balls) |

Southern Brave won by 2 runs
Rose Bowl, Southampton
Umpires: Ben Debenham (Eng) and James Middlebrook (Eng)
Player of the match: Chris Jordan (Southern Brave)

- Welsh Fire won the toss and elected to field.
- Points: Southern Brave 2, Welsh Fire 0.

5 August 2023
14:30
Scorecard

| Manchester Originals; 138/5 (100 balls) | v | London Spirit |
| Jos Buttler 62 (36); Ravi Bopara 2/13 (10 balls) |

No result
Old Trafford, Manchester
Umpires: Graham Lloyd (Eng) and Steve O'Shaughnessy (Eng)

- London Spirit won the toss and elected to field.
- No further play was possible due to rain.
- Points: Manchester Originals 1, London Spirit 1.

5 August 2023
18:30 (N)
Scorecard

| Birmingham Phoenix | v | Trent Rockets |

Match abandoned
Edgbaston, Birmingham
Umpires: Paul Pollard (Eng) and Russell Warren (Eng)

- No toss.
- No play was possible due to rain.
- Points: Birmingham Phoenix 1, Trent Rockets 1.

6 August 2023
14:30
Scorecard

| Northern Superchargers; 201/3 (100 balls) | v | Southern Brave; 141/5 (100 balls) |
| Matthew Short 73 (36); Rehan Ahmed 1/21 (20 balls) | | Tim David 40 (19); Reece Topley 3/30 (20 balls) |

Northern Superchargers won by 60 runs
Rose Bowl, Southampton
Umpires: Ian Blackwell (Eng) and Ben Debenham (Eng)
Player of the match: Matthew Short (Northern Superchargers)

- Southern Brave won the toss and elected to field.
- Points: Northern Superchargers 2, Southern Brave 0.

6 August 2023
18:00 (N)
Scorecard

| Oval Invincibles; 138/6 (100 balls) | v | Welsh Fire; 138/7 (100 balls) |
| Jordan Cox 51 (43); Shaheen Afridi 2/22 (20 balls) | | Joe Clarke 69* (46); Gus Atkinson 3/26 (20 balls) |

Match tied
The Oval, London
Attendance: 21,432
Umpires: Tom Lungley (Eng) and Paul Pollard (Eng)
Player of the match: Tom Curran (Oval Invincibles)

- Welsh Fire won the toss and elected to bat.
- Points: Welsh Fire 1, Oval Invincibles 1.

7 August 2023
18:30 (N)
Scorecard

| Manchester Originals; 160/8 (100 balls) | v | Birmingham Phoenix; 111 (98 balls) |
| Jos Buttler 43 (33); Benny Howell 3/21 (20 balls) | | Liam Livingstone 27 (25); Tom Hartley 3/13 (20 balls) |

Manchester Originals won by 49 runs
Old Trafford, Manchester
Umpires: Hassan Adnan (Eng) and Richard Kettleborough (Eng)
Player of the match: Usama Mir (Manchester Originals)

- Birmingham Phoenix won the toss and elected to field.
- Points: Manchester Originals 2, Birmingham Phoenix 0.

8 August 2023
18:30 (N)
Scorecard

| Southern Brave; 34/3 (26 balls) | v | London Spirit |
| James Vince 19 (9); Daniel Worrall 1/10 (10 balls) |

No result
Lord's, London
Umpires: Lubabalo Gcuma (SA) and Paul Pollard (Eng)

- London Spirit won the toss and elected to field.
- The Match was reduced to 50 balls per side due to rain.
- No further play was possible due to rain.
- Points: Southern Brave 1, London Spirit 1.

9 August 2023
15:00
Scorecard

| Northern Superchargers; 142/5 (100 balls) | v | Trent Rockets; 139/7 (100 balls) |
| David Wiese 54* (25); Luke Wood 3/23 (20 balls) | | Alex Hales 29 (22); Wayne Parnell 3/21 (20 balls) |

Northern Superchargers won by 3 runs
Trent Bridge, Nottingham
Umpires: Richard Kettleborough (Eng) and Mark Newell (Eng)
Player of the match: David Wiese (Northern Superchargers)

- Trent Rockets won the toss and elected to field.
- Points: Northern Superchargers 2, Trent Rockets 0.

9 August 2023
18:30 (N)
Scorecard

| Oval Invincibles; 186/5 (100 balls) | v | Manchester Originals; 92 (89 balls) |
| Heinrich Klaasen 60 (27); Jamie Overton 2/21 (20 balls) | | Jos Buttler 23 (24); Spencer Johnson 3/1 (20 balls) |

Oval Invincibles won by 94 runs
The Oval, London
Umpires: Lubabalo Gcuma (SA) and Rob White (Eng)
Player of the match: Heinrich Klaasen (Oval Invincibles)

- Manchester Originals won the toss and elected to field.
- Points: Oval Invincibles 2, Manchester Originals 0.

10 August 2023
18:30 (N)
Scorecard

| Birmingham Phoenix; 112/7 (100 balls) | v | Welsh Fire; 116/4 (85 balls) |
| Liam Livingstone 28 (20); David Payne 2/11 (15 balls) | | Stephen Eskinazi 43 (18); Benny Howell 2/16 (20 balls) |

Welsh Fire won by 6 wickets
Edgbaston, Birmingham
Umpires: Robert Bailey (Eng) and Rob White (Eng)
Player of the match: Stephen Eskinazi (Welsh Fire)

- Birmingham Phoenix won the toss and elected to bat.
- Points: Welsh Fire 2, Birmingham Phoenix 0.

11 August 2023
18:30 (N)
Scorecard

| Oval Invincibles; 185/5 (100 balls) | v | Northern Superchargers; 176/8 (100 balls) |
| Jordan Cox 73* (38); Wayne Parnell 2/29 (20 balls) | | Tom Banton 81 (43); Gus Atkinson 3/24 (20 balls) |

Oval Invincibles won by 9 runs
Headingley, Leeds
Umpires: Steve O'Shaughnessy (Eng) and Russell Warren (Eng)
Player of the match: Jordan Cox (Oval Invincibles)

- Oval Invincibles won the toss and elected to bat.
- Points: Oval Invincibles 2, Northern Superchargers 0.

12 August 2023
14:30
Scorecard

| London Spirit; 195/4 (100 balls) | v | Trent Rockets; 193/5 (100 balls) |
| Dan Lawrence 93 (49); Ish Sodhi 2/29 (20 balls) | | Joe Root 72* (35); Daniel Worrall 2/23 (20 balls) |

London Spirit won by 2 runs
Lord's, London
Umpires: Richard Kettleborough (Eng) and James Middlebrook (Eng)
Player of the match: Dan Lawrence (London Spirit)

- Trent Rockets won the toss and elected to field.
- Points: London Spirit 2, Trent Rockets 0.

12 August 2023
18:00 (N)
Scorecard

| Welsh Fire; 87 (100 balls) | v | Southern Brave; 91/1 (59 balls) |
| Stephen Eskinazi 38 (34); Tymal Mills 4/13 (20 balls) | | Devon Conway 35* (25); David Payne 1/10 (10 balls) |

Southern Brave won by 9 wickets
Sophia Gardens, Cardiff
Umpires: Rob Bailey (Eng) and Mark Newell (Eng)
Player of the match: George Garton (Southern Brave)

- Southern Brave won the toss and elected to field.
- Points: Southern Brave 2, Welsh Fire 0.
- Tymal Mills (Southern Brave) took a hat-trick.

13 August 2023
14:30
Scorecard

| Manchester Originals; 182/6 (90 balls) | v | Northern Superchargers; 141/9 (90 balls) |
| Jamie Overton 83* (30); Reece Topley 3/29 (20 balls) | | Matthew Short 37 (18); Usama Mir 4/19 (20 balls) |

Manchester Originals won by 40 runs (DLS method)
Headingley, Leeds
Umpires: Tom Lungley (Eng) and David Millns (Eng)
Player of the match: Jamie Overton (Manchester Originals)

- Manchester Originals won the toss and elected to bat.
- The match was reduced to 90 balls due to rain.
- Points: Manchester Originals 2, Northern Superchargers 0.

13 August 2023
18:00 (N)
Scorecard

| Birmingham Phoenix; 160/8 (100 balls) | v | Oval Invincibles; 119 (99 balls) |
| Jamie Smith 60 (33); Zak Chappell 4/33 (15 balls) | | Ross Whiteley 35 (31); Kane Richardson 4/32 (19 balls) |

Birmingham Phoenix won by 41 runs
Edgbaston, Birmingham
Umpires: Paul Pollard (Eng) and Russell Warren (Eng)
Player of the match: Jamie Smith (Birmingham Phoenix)

- Oval Invincibles won the toss and elected to field.
- Points: Birmingham Phoenix 2, Manchester Originals 0.

14 August 2023
18:30 (N)
Scorecard

| Trent Rockets; 152/6 (100 balls) | v | Welsh Fire; 148/6 (100 balls) |
| Colin Munro 66* (35); David Willey 2/15 (15 balls) | | Joe Clarke 54 (34); Daniel Sams 2/35 (20 balls) |

Trent Rockets won by 4 runs
Sophia Gardens, Cardiff
Umpires: Ian Blackwell (Eng) and Graham Lloyd (Eng)
Player of the match: Colin Munro (Trent Rockets)

- Welsh Fire won the toss and elected to field.
- Points: Trent Rockets 2, Welsh Fire 0.

15 August 2023
18:30 (N)
Scorecard

| Oval Invincibles; 189/4 (100 balls) | v | London Spirit; 187/7 (100 balls) |
| Will Jacks 68 (42); Daryl Mitchell 2/16 (10 balls) | | Adam Rossington 61 (32); Will Jacks 2/22 (15 balls) |

Oval Invincibles won by 2 runs
The Oval, London
Umpires: Richard Kettleborough (Eng) and Russell Warren (Eng)
Player of the match: Will Jacks (Oval Invincibles)

- Oval Invincibles won the toss and elected to bat.
- Points: Oval Invincibles 2, London Spirit 0

16 August 2023
18:30 (N)
Scorecard

| Birmingham Phoenix; 119/8 (100 balls) | v | Southern Brave; 120/6 (94 balls) |
| Ben Duckett 27 (17); Tymal Mills 3/20 (20 balls) | | George Garton 28 (18); Tanveer Sangha 2/23 (20 balls) |

Southern Brave won by 4 wickets
Rose Bowl, Southampton
Umpires: Tom Lungley (Eng) and Nigel Llong (Eng)
Player of the match: Tymal Mills (Southern Brave)

- Birmingham Phoenix won the toss and elected to bat.
- Points: Southern Brave 2, Birmingham Phoenix 0.

17 August 2023
18:30 (N)
Scorecard

| Manchester Originals; 181/6 (100 balls) | v | Trent Rockets; 171/5 (100 balls) |
| Phil Salt 86 (32); Daniel Sams 2/28 (20 balls) | | Tom Kohler-Cadmore 64 (42); Josh Tongue 3/32 (20 balls) |

Manchester Originals won by 10 runs
Trent Bridge, Nottingham
Umpires: David Millns (Eng) and Martin Saggers (Eng)
Player of the match: Phil Salt (Manchester Originals)

- Trent Rockets won the toss and elected to field.
- Points: Manchester Originals 2, Trent Rockets 0.

18 August 2023
18:30 (N)
Scorecard

| London Spirit; 160/6 (100 balls) | v | Northern Superchargers; 147/7 (100 balls) |
| Adam Rossington 53 (30); Adil Rashid 2/18 (20 balls) | | Harry Brook 44 (24); Ravi Bopara 4/21 (20 balls) |

London Spirit won by 13 runs
Lord's, London
Umpires: Nigel Llong (Eng) and Neil Pratt (Eng)
Player of the match: Ravi Bopara (London Spirit)

- Northern Superchargers won the toss and elected to field.
- Points: London Spirit 2, Northern Superchargers.

19 August 2023
14:30
Scorecard

| Trent Rockets; 162/6 (100 balls) | v | Birmingham Phoenix; 116/9 (100 balls) |
| Colin Munro 34 (17); Adam Milne 2/24 (20 balls) | | Jamie Smith 38 (22); Daniel Sams 3/17 (20 balls) |

Trent Rockets won by 46 runs
Trent Bridge, Nottingham
Umpires: Steve O'Shaughnessy (Eng) and Rob White (Eng)
Player of the match: Matt Carter (Trent Rockets)

- Birmingham Phoenix won the toss and elected to field.
- Points: Trent Rockets 2, Birmingham Phoenix 0.

19 August 2023
18:00 (N)
Scorecard

| Oval Invincibles; 139/7 (100 balls) | v | Southern Brave; 131/7 (100 balls) |
| Tom Curran 43* (28); Chris Jordan 3/20 (20 balls) | | Tim David 44* (18); Tom Curran 3/43 (20 balls) |

Oval Invincibles won by 8 runs
Rose Bowl, Southampton
Umpires: Neil Bainton (Eng) and Martin Saggers (Eng)
Player of the match: Tom Curran (Oval Invincibles)

- Oval Invincibles won the toss and elected to bat.
- Points: Oval Invincibles 2, Southern Brave 0.

20 August 2023
14:30
Scorecard

| Manchester Originals; 164/6 (100 balls) | v | Northern Superchargers; 83 (76 balls) |
| Jos Buttler 75 (47); Adil Rashid 4/18 (20 balls) | | Adam Hose 15 (6); Calvin Harrison 5/11 (20 balls) |

Manchester Originals won by 81 runs
Old Trafford, Manchester
Umpires: Hassan Adnan (Eng) and James Middlebrook (Eng)
Player of the match: Calvin Harrison (Manchester Originals)

- Manchester Originals won the toss and elected to bat.
- Calvin Harrison took the best figures in The Hundred history.
- Points: Manchester Originals 2, Northern Superchargers 0.

20 August 2023
18:00 (N)
Scorecard

| London Spirit; 109/9 (100 balls) | v | Welsh Fire; 110/4 (93 balls) |
| Liam Dawson 24 (14); Matt Henry 2/15 (20 balls) | | Jonny Bairstow 41 (38); Daniel Worrall 3/24 (20 balls) |

Welsh Fire won by 6 wickets
Sophia Gardens, Cardiff
Umpires: Rob Bailey (Eng) and Alex Wharf (Eng)
Player of the match: Tom Abell (Welsh Fire)

- London Spirit won the toss and elected to bat.
- Points: Welsh Fire 2, London Spirit 0.

21 August 2023
18:30 (N)
Scorecard

| Trent Rockets; 148/7 (100 balls) | v | Oval Invincibles; 151/5 (92 balls) |
| Colin Munro 36 (25); Adam Zampa 2/20 (20 balls) | | Sam Billings 76* (40); Daniel Sams 2/38 (20 balls) |

Oval Invincibles won by 5 wickets
The Oval, London
Umpires: Paul Pollard (Eng) and Rob White (Eng)
Player of the match: Sam Billings (Oval Invincibles)

- Trent Rockets won the toss and elected to bat.
- Points: Oval Invincibles 2, Trent Rockets 0.

22 August 2023
18:30 (N)
Scorecard

| Northern Superchargers; 158/7 (100 balls) | v | Welsh Fire; 159/2 (90 balls) |
| Harry Brook 105* (42); David Willey 2/10 (15 balls) | | Stephen Eskinazi 58 (28); Brydon Carse 1/13 (10 balls) |

Welsh Fire won by 8 wickets
Headingley, Leeds
Umpires: Mike Burns (Eng) and Michael Gough (Eng)
Player of the match: Harry Brook (Northern Superchargers)

- Northern Superchargers won the toss and elected to bat.
- Points: Welsh Fire 2, Northern Superchargers 0.

23 August 2023
18:30 (N)
Scorecard

| Manchester Originals; 130/8 (100 balls) | v | Southern Brave; 134/4 (95 balls) |
| Jos Buttler 45 (42); Tymal Mills 3/27 (20 balls) | | Devon Conway 54* (40); Zaman Khan 2/22 (20 balls) |

Southern Brave won by 6 wickets
Old Trafford, Manchester
Umpires: Ben Debenham (Eng) and Alex Wharf (Eng)
Player of the match: Devon Conway (Southern Brave)

- Southern Brave won the toss and elected to field.
- Points: Southern Brave 2, Manchester Originals 0.

24 August 2023
18:30 (N)
Scorecard

| Birmingham Phoenix; 180/5 (100 balls) | v | London Spirit; 108 (89 balls) |
| Jamie Smith 52 (31); Tim Southee 3/23 (20 balls) | | Daryl Mitchell 57 (36); Adam Milne 4/20 (20 balls) |

Birmingham Phoenix won by 77 runs
Edgbaston, Birmingham
Umpires: Michael Gough (Eng) and Paul Baldwin (Eng)
Player of the match: Adam Milne (Birmingham Phoenix)

- London Spirit won the toss and elected to field.
- Birmingham Phoenix 2, London Spirit 0.

== Knockout stages ==
=== Women ===
| Eliminator | | | Final |
| | | | 1 | Southern Brave | 139/6 (100 balls) |
| 2 | Northern Superchargers | Rainout (NR) | 2 | Northern Superchargers | 105 (94 balls) |
| 3 | Welsh Fire | 104/2 (75 balls) |

==== Eliminator ====
26 August 2023
14:30
Scorecard

| Welsh Fire; 104/2 (75 balls) | v | Northern Superchargers |
| Sophia Dunkley 38 (28); Lucy Higham 1/16 (15 balls) |

No result
The Oval, London
Umpires: Mark Newell (Eng) and Sue Redfern (Eng)

- Welsh Fire won the toss and elected to bat.
- The match was reduced to 95 balls per side due to rain.
- No further play was possible due to rain.
- Northern Superchargers advanced to final due to better position in the group stage.

==== Final ====
27 August 2023
14:15
Scorecard

| Southern Brave; 139/6 (100 balls) | v | Northern Superchargers; 105 (94 balls) |
| Danni Wyatt 59 (38); Kate Cross 3/21 (20 balls) | | Jemimah Rodrigues 24 (14); Kalea Moore 3/15 (20 balls) |

Southern Brave won by 34 runs
Lord's, London
Umpires: Anna Harris (Eng) and Rob White (Eng)
Player of the match: Danni Wyatt (Southern Brave)

- Northern Superchargers won the toss and elected to field.

=== Men ===
| Eliminator | | | Final |
| | | | 1 | Oval Invincibles | 161/5 (100 balls) |
| 2 | Manchester Originals | 201/3 (96 balls) | 2 | Manchester Originals | 147/6 (100 balls) |
| 3 | Southern Brave | 196/1 (100 balls) |

==== Eliminator ====
26 August 2023
18:00 (N)
Scorecard

| Southern Brave; 196/1 (100 balls) | v | Manchester Originals; 201/3 (96 balls) |
| Finn Allen 69 (38); Paul Walter 1/27 (15 balls) | | Jos Buttler 82 (46); Mitchell Santner 1/17 (15 balls) |

Manchester Originals won by 7 wickets
The Oval, London
Umpires: Martin Saggers (Eng) and Russell Warren (Eng)
Player of the match: Jos Buttler (Manchester Originals)

- Manchester Originals won the toss and elected to field.

==== Final ====
27 August 2023
18:00 (N)
Scorecard

| Oval Invincibles; 161/5 (100 balls) | v | Manchester Originals; 147/6 (100 balls) |
| Tom Curran 67* (34); Richard Gleeson 2/37 (20 balls) | | Max Holden 37 (25); Will Jacks 2/11 (15 balls) |

Oval Invincibles won by 14 runs
Lord's, London
Umpires: Mike Burns (Eng) and Alex Wharf (Eng)
Player of the match: Tom Curran (Oval Invincibles)

- Manchester Originals won the toss and elected to field.

== Statistics ==
=== Most runs ===
Women
| Runs | Player | Team | High score |
|---|---|---|---|
| 295 | Danni Wyatt | Southern Brave | 67 |
| 290 | Tammy Beaumont | Welsh Fire | 118 |
| 279 | Phoebe Litchfield | Northern Superchargers | 68 |
| 268 | Maia Bouchier | Southern Brave | 63 not out |
| 262 | Sophia Dunkley | Welsh Fire | 68 |

- Source: ESPN Cricinfo

Men
| Runs | Player | Team | High score |
|---|---|---|---|
| 391 | Jos Buttler | Manchester Originals | 82 |
| 240 | Finn Allen | Southern Brave | 69 |
| 238 | Harry Brook | Northern Superchargers | 105 not out |
| 232 | Phil Salt | Manchester Originals | 86 |
| 227 | Will Jacks | Oval Invincibles | 68 |

- Source: ESPNcricinfo

=== Most wickets ===
Women
| Wickets | Player | Team | Best bowling |
|---|---|---|---|
| 16 | Georgia Adams | Southern Brave | 4/11 |
| 11 | Sarah Glenn | London Spirit | 3/15 |
| 11 | Marizanne Kapp | Oval Invincibles | 4/18 |
| 11 | Katie Levick | Birmingham Phoenix | 2/12 |
| 11 | Shabnim Ismail | Welsh Fire | 3/12 |
| 11 | Georgia Wareham | Northern Superchargers | 3/7 |

- Source: ESPN Cricinfo

Men
| Wickets | Player | Team | Best bowling |
|---|---|---|---|
| 16 | Tymal Mills | Southern Brave | 4/13 |
| 13 | Reece Topley | Northern Superchargers | 3/29 |
| 12 | Daniel Sams | Trent Rockets | 3/17 |
| 11 | Adil Rashid | Northern Superchargers | 4/18 |
| 11 | Nathan Sowter | Oval Invincibles | 3/34 |

- Source: ESPNcricinfo

== Attendances ==
The total attendance for the men's and women's teams was 580,000. The average attendance was 9,750.

| # | Men's team | Average attendance |
|---|---|---|
| 1 | London Spirit | 14,267 |
| 2 | Trent Rockets | 12,492 |
| 3 | Oval Invincibles | 10,345 |
| 4 | Southern Brave | 9,653 |
| 5 | Birmingham Phoenix | 9,122 |
| 6 | Manchester Originals | 8,234 |
| 7 | Northern Superchargers | 7,654 |
| 8 | Welsh Fire | 6,456 |
