= 2023 Women's Ashes series =

International tour

Australia women's cricket team in England in 2023
	England	Australia
- Dates: 22 June – 18 July 2023
Captains	Heather Knight	Alyssa Healy
- Player of the series: Nat Sciver-Brunt (Eng); Ashleigh Gardner (Aus)

Test series
- Result: Australia won the 1-match series 1–0
Most runs	Tammy Beaumont (230)	Annabel Sutherland (152)
Most wickets	Sophie Ecclestone (10)	Ashleigh Gardner (12)

One Day International series
- Results: England won the 3-match series 2–1
Most runs	Nat Sciver-Brunt (271)	Ellyse Perry (185)
Most wickets	Lauren Bell (7)	Ashleigh Gardner (9)
- Player of the series: Nat Sciver-Brunt (Eng)

Twenty20 International series
- Results: England won the 3-match series 2–1
Most runs	Danni Wyatt (109)	Beth Mooney (115)
Most wickets	Sophie Ecclestone (5)	Jess Jonassen (4); Megan Schutt (4)
- Player of the series: Danni Wyatt (Eng)

Ashes series points
- England 8, Australia 8

The 2023 Women's Ashes series (officially the Metro Bank Women's Ashes Series for sponsorship reasons) was a cricket series which took place in England in June and July 2023 as the 2023 edition of the Women's Ashes. For the series, England and Australia faced each other in one Test, three One Day International (ODI) and three Twenty20 International (T20I) matches. The ODI series formed part of the 2022–2025 ICC Women's Championship tournament. A points-based system was used across all three formats of the tour to determine the winner of the Ashes series. The Test match at Trent Bridge was the first ever women's Test in England and second overall to be scheduled for five days of play. Australia were the defending champions, having won the 2021–22 Women's Ashes series 12–4.

Australia won the only Test match by 89 runs. It was the first women's Test match to not end in a draw since 2015, breaking a streak of six consecutive drawn Tests. Australia also won the first T20I by four wickets, which meant that England needed to win all five of the remaining matches in the series in order to regain the Ashes. England won the second and third matches to claim the T20I leg of the series 2–1. This was the first T20I series defeat for Australia since the 2017–18 Ashes series. England levelled the Ashes points tally by winning the first ODI by two wickets. Australia won the second ODI by just three runs to retain the Ashes, despite an unbeaten century by Nat Sciver-Brunt. Sciver-Brunt scored a second consecutive century in the third ODI, which England won by 69 runs. England won the ODI series 2–1, inflicting Australia's first ODI series defeat since 2013.

The Ashes series ended as a draw, with both teams earning eight points.

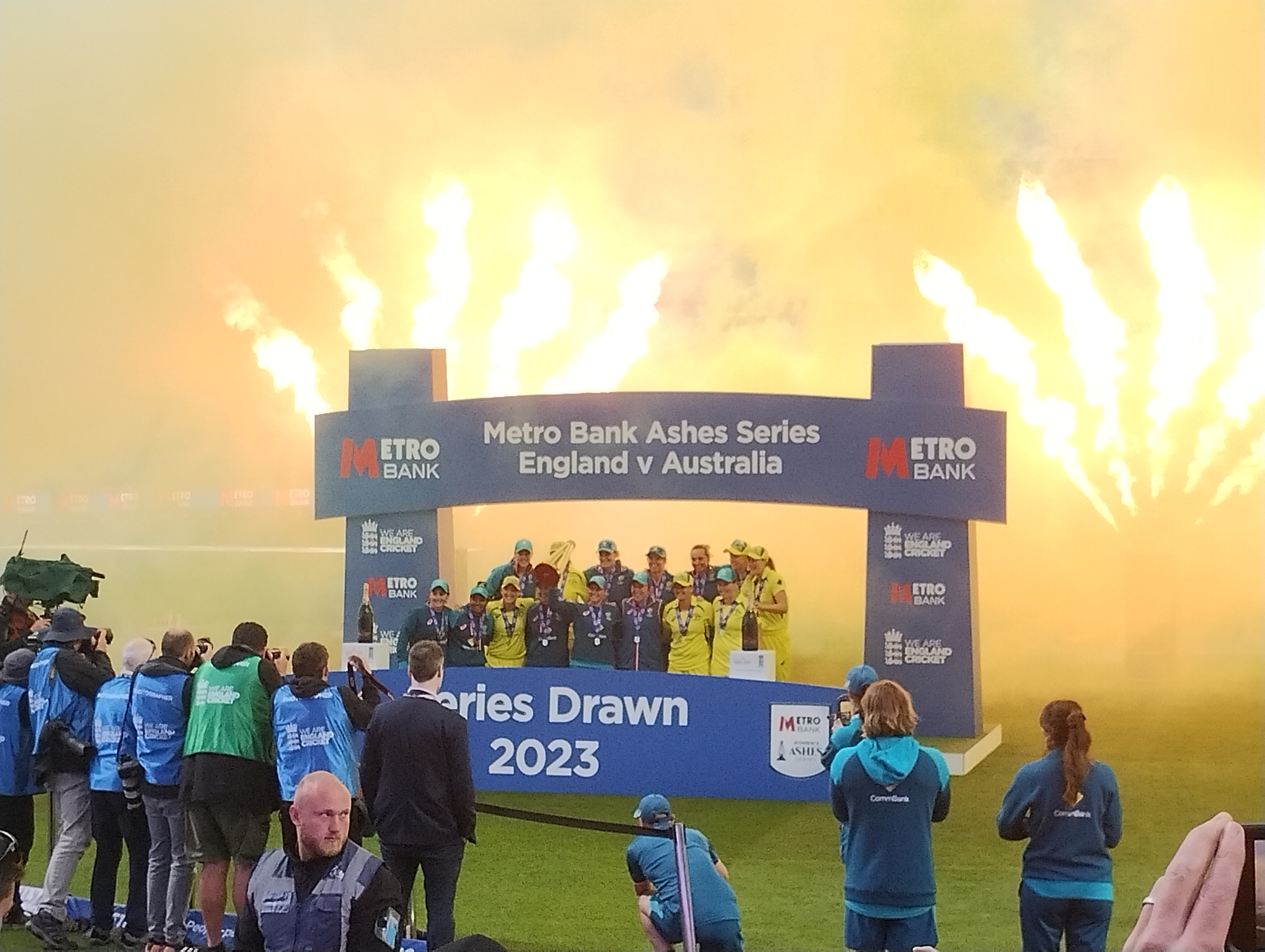
Australia celebrate retaining the Ashes after the final match of the series at the County Ground, Taunton.

== Squads ==
England			Australia
Test	ODIs	T20Is	Test, ODIs & T20Is
Heather Knight (c); Nat Sciver-Brunt (vc); Tammy Beaumont (wk); Lauren Bell; ~~Alice Capsey~~; Kate Cross; ~~Alice Davidson-Richards~~; Sophia Dunkley; Sophie Ecclestone; Lauren Filer; Danielle Gibson; Amy Jones (wk); Emma Lamb; Issy Wong; Danni Wyatt	Heather Knight (c); Nat Sciver-Brunt (vc); Tammy Beaumont (wk); Lauren Bell; Alice Capsey; Kate Cross; Charlie Dean; Sophia Dunkley; Sophie Ecclestone; Lauren Filer; Danielle Gibson; Sarah Glenn; Amy Jones (wk); Issy Wong; Danni Wyatt	Heather Knight (c); Nat Sciver-Brunt (vc); Lauren Bell; Maia Bouchier; Alice Capsey; Kate Cross; Freya Davies; Charlie Dean; Sophia Dunkley; Sophie Ecclestone; Danielle Gibson; Sarah Glenn; Amy Jones (wk); Issy Wong; Lauren Winfield-Hill (wk); Danni Wyatt	~~Meg Lanning (c)~~; Alyssa Healy (c, wk); Tahlia McGrath (vc); Darcie Brown; Ashleigh Gardner; Kim Garth; Grace Harris; Jess Jonassen; Alana King; Phoebe Litchfield; Beth Mooney (wk); Ellyse Perry; Megan Schutt; Annabel Sutherland; Georgia Wareham

On 27 May 2023, Australia's Meg Lanning was ruled out of tour for medical reasons. In her absence, Alyssa Healy was named as Australia's captain and Tahlia McGrath was named as the vice-captain for the tour.

On 20 June 2023, both Alice Capsey and Alice Davidson-Richards were removed from England's Test squad to enable them to play for England A.

== Tour matches ==
15–17 June 2023
Scorecard

Australia	v	England A
284 (61.3 overs); Beth Mooney 107 (133); Charlie Dean 3/49 (11 overs)		562 (115.1 overs); Lauren Winfield-Hill 106 (148); Kim Garth 4/69 (19 overs)
371/7 (76 overs); Annabel Sutherland 116 (138); Kirstie Gordon 5/49 (15 overs)

Match drawn
Grace Road, Leicester
Umpires: Anna Harris (Eng) and Sue Redfern (Eng)

- Australia won the toss and elected to bat.

15–17 June 2023
Scorecard

Australia A	v	England
221 (63.3 overs); Charli Knott 51* (125); Sophie Ecclestone 5/38 (14.3 overs)		650 (118.2 overs); Tammy Beaumont 201 (238); Jess Jonassen 3/111 (20 overs)
361/7 (83 overs); Jess Jonassen 173* (224); Lauren Bell 3/31 (9 overs)

Match drawn
County Cricket Ground, Derby
Umpires: Rose Fernando (Eng) and Jasmine Naeem (Eng)

- Australia A won the toss and elected to bat.

== Only Test ==
22–26 June 2023
Scorecard

Australia	v	England
473 (124.2 overs); Annabel Sutherland 137* (184); Sophie Ecclestone 5/129 (46.2 overs)		463 (121.2 overs); Tammy Beaumont 208 (331); Ashleigh Gardner 4/99 (25.2 overs)
257 (78.5 overs); Beth Mooney 85 (168); Sophie Ecclestone 5/63 (30.5 overs)		178 (49 overs); Danni Wyatt 54 (88); Ashleigh Gardner 8/66 (20 overs)

Australia won by 89 runs
Trent Bridge, Nottingham
Umpires: Anna Harris (Eng) (Note: Sophie McLelland (Eng) replaced Anna Harris as the on-field umpire on the fifth day.) and Sue Redfern (Eng)
Player of the match: Ashleigh Gardner (Aus)

- Australia won the toss and elected to bat.
- Lauren Filer, Danni Wyatt (Eng), Kim Garth and Phoebe Litchfield (Aus) all made their Test debuts.
- Annabel Sutherland (Aus) and Tammy Beaumont (Eng) both scored their first centuries in Tests.
- Tammy Beaumont also became the first English batter to score a double century in women's Tests.
- Sophie Ecclestone (Eng) and Ashleigh Gardner (Aus) both took their first five-wicket hauls and their first ten-wicket hauls in Tests.
- Ashes series points: Australia 4, England 0.

== T20I series ==
=== 1st T20I ===
1 July 2023
18:35 (D/N)
Scorecard

England; 153/7 (20 overs)	v	Australia; 154/6 (19.5 overs)
Sophia Dunkley 56 (49); Jess Jonassen 3/25 (4 overs)		Beth Mooney 61* (47); Sophie Ecclestone 2/24 (3.5 overs)

Australia won by 4 wickets
Edgbaston, Birmingham
Umpires: Anna Harris (Eng) and Sue Redfern (Eng)
Player of the match: Beth Mooney (Aus)

- Australia won the toss and elected to field.
- Danielle Gibson (Eng) made her T20I debut.
- Ashes series points: Australia 2, England 0.

=== 2nd T20I ===
5 July 2023
18:00 (D/N)
Scorecard

England; 186/9 (20 overs)	v	Australia; 183/8 (20 overs)
Danni Wyatt 76 (46); Annabel Sutherland 3/28 (4 overs)		Ellyse Perry 51* (27); Sarah Glenn 2/27 (4 overs)

England won by 3 runs
The Oval, London
Umpires: Jasmine Naeem (Eng) and Russell Warren (Eng)
Player of the match: Danni Wyatt (Eng)

- Australia won the toss and elected to field.
- Heather Knight (Eng) played in her 100th T20I.
- Sophie Ecclestone (Eng) took her 100th wicket in T20Is.
- Ashes series points: England 2, Australia 0.

=== 3rd T20I ===
8 July 2023
18:35 (D/N)
Scorecard

Australia; 155/7 (20 overs)	v	England; 121/5 (13.2 overs)
Ellyse Perry 34 (25); Nat Sciver-Brunt 2/31 (4 overs)		Alice Capsey 46 (23); Megan Schutt 2/35 (3 overs)

England won by 5 wickets (DLS method)
Lord's, London
Umpires: Sue Redfern (Eng) and Russell Warren (Eng)
Player of the match: Alice Capsey (Eng)

- England won the toss and elected to field.
- England were set a revised target of 119 runs in 14 overs.
- Ashes series points: England 2, Australia 0.

== ODI series ==
=== 1st ODI ===
12 July 2023
13:00 (D/N)
Scorecard

Australia; 263/8 (50 overs)	v	England; 267/8 (48.1 overs)
Beth Mooney 81* (99); Nat Sciver-Brunt 2/38 (8 overs)		Heather Knight 75* (86); Ashleigh Gardner 3/42 (10 overs)

England won by 2 wickets
Bristol County Ground, Bristol
Umpires: Anna Harris (Eng) and Sue Redfern (Eng)
Player of the match: Heather Knight (Eng)

- Australia won the toss and elected to bat.
- This was England's highest successful run chase in women's ODIs.
- Ashes series points: England 2, Australia 0.
- Women's Championship points: England 2, Australia 0.

=== 2nd ODI ===
16 July 2023
11:00
Scorecard

Australia; 282/7 (50 overs)	v	England; 279/7 (50 overs)
Ellyse Perry 91 (124); Sophie Ecclestone 3/40 (10 overs)		Nat Sciver-Brunt 111* (99); Alana King 3/44 (10 overs)

Australia won by 3 runs
Rose Bowl, Southampton
Umpires: Mike Burns (Eng) and Jasmine Naeem (Eng)
Player of the match: Alana King (Aus)

- England won the toss and elected to field.
- Ashes series points: Australia 2, England 0.
- Women's Championship points: Australia 2, England 0.

=== 3rd ODI ===
18 July 2023
13:00 (D/N)
Scorecard

England; 285/9 (50 overs)	v	Australia; 199 (35.3 overs)
Nat Sciver-Brunt 129 (149); Jess Jonassen 3/30 (5 overs)		Ellyse Perry 53 (58); Kate Cross 3/48 (8 overs)

England won by 69 runs (DLS method)
County Ground, Taunton
Umpires: Mike Burns (Eng) and Anna Harris (Eng)
Player of the match: Nat Sciver-Brunt (Eng)

- Australia won the toss and elected to field.
- Australia were set a revised target of 269 from 44 overs due to rain.
- Ashes series points: England 2, Australia 0.
- Women's Championship points: England 2, Australia 0.
