= New Zealand women's cricket team in England in 2021 =

International cricket tour

	England women	New Zealand women
- Dates: 1 – 26 September 2021
Captains	Heather Knight (Note: Nat Sciver captained England Women for the first and second WT20Is.)	Sophie Devine

One Day International series
- Results: England women won the 5-match series 4–1
Most runs	Heather Knight (214)	Amy Satterthwaite (173)
Most wickets	Charlie Dean (10)	Hannah Rowe (10)
- Player of the series: Heather Knight (Eng)

Twenty20 International series
- Results: England women won the 3-match series 2–1
Most runs	Tammy Beaumont (113)	Sophie Devine (87)
Most wickets	Sarah Glenn (4); Tash Farrant (4)	Leigh Kasperek (6)
- Player of the series: Sophie Devine (NZ)

The New Zealand women's cricket team toured England to play the England women's cricket team in September 2021. The tour consisted of three Women's Twenty20 International (WT20I) and five Women's One Day International (WODI) matches.

England won the first WT20I match by 46 runs, with New Zealand winning the second match by four wickets to level the series. England won the third WT20I match by four wickets to win the series 2–1. England won the first two WODI matches by 30 runs and 13 runs respectively to take a 2–0 lead in the series. On the day before the third WODI, a member of the New Zealand team management received a bomb threat, but the threat was deemed "not credible". The match went ahead as scheduled, with New Zealand winning by three wickets. England won the fourth WODI by three wickets to win the series with a match to spare. England won the fifth WODI by 203 runs to win the series 4–1.

== Squads ==
England		New Zealand
WODIs	WT20Is	WODIs and WT20Is
Heather Knight (c); Nat Sciver (vc); Tammy Beaumont; Maia Bouchier; Katherine Brunt; Kate Cross; Freya Davies; Charlie Dean; Sophia Dunkley; Sophie Ecclestone; Tash Farrant; Sarah Glenn; Amy Jones (wk); Anya Shrubsole; Lauren Winfield-Hill; Danni Wyatt	Heather Knight (c); Nat Sciver (vc); Tammy Beaumont; Maia Bouchier; Katherine Brunt; Freya Davies; Charlie Dean; Sophia Dunkley; Sophie Ecclestone; Tash Farrant; Sarah Glenn; Amy Jones (wk); Emma Lamb; Anya Shrubsole; Mady Villiers; Danni Wyatt	Sophie Devine (c); Amy Satterthwaite (vc); Suzie Bates; Lauren Down; Claudia Green; Maddy Green; Brooke Halliday; Hayley Jensen; Leigh Kasperek; Jess Kerr; Katey Martin (wk); ~~Rosemary Mair~~; Jess McFadyen (wk); Thamsyn Newton; Molly Penfold; Hannah Rowe; Lea Tahuhu

New Zealand did not name individual squads for the WODI and WT20I matches, opting instead to name a combined squad of sixteen players for the tour. In August 2021, Rosemary Mair was ruled out of New Zealand's squad due to an injury. Molly Penfold was added to the squad as Mair's replacement.

Maia Bouchier and Charlie Dean earned their maiden call-ups to the England team for the WT20I matches. However, both players were ruled out of the first match after being identified as possible COVID-19 contacts, with Emma Lamb being added to England's squad. Anya Shrubsole was ruled out of England's squad for the first two WODI matches due to an ankle injury. Maia Bouchier was added to the WODI squad ahead of the third match of the series, but was released before the fifth match to enable her to play in the 2021 Rachael Heyhoe Flint Trophy final.

== Tour match ==
Ahead of the tour, New Zealand played a warm-up match against the England A team, with England A winning by four wickets.

23 August 2021
11:00
Scorecard

New Zealand; 223 (49.5 overs)	v	England A 226/6 (47.4 overs)
Suzie Bates 70 (110); Bryony Smith 2/23 (5 overs)		Bryony Smith 53 (58); Hannah Rowe 2/32 (7 overs)

England A won by 4 wickets
County Cricket Ground, Derby
Umpires: Anthony Harris (Eng) and Jasmine Naeem (Eng)

- New Zealand won the toss and elected to bat.

== WT20I series ==
=== 1st WT20I ===
1 September 2021
18:30 (N)
Scorecard

England; 184/4 (20 overs)	v	New Zealand; 138 (18.5 overs)
Tammy Beaumont 97 (65); Hayley Jensen 2/26 (4 overs)		Amy Satterthwaite 43 (31); Katherine Brunt 2/9 (3 overs)

England Women won by 46 runs
County Cricket Ground, Chelmsford
Umpires: Graham Lloyd (Eng) and Sue Redfern (Eng)
Player of the match: Tammy Beaumont (Eng)

- New Zealand Women won the toss and elected to field.
- Emma Lamb (Eng) made her WT20I debut.

=== 2nd WT20I ===
4 September 2021
19:00 (N)
Scorecard

England; 127/7 (20 overs)	v	New Zealand; 128/6 (18.2 overs)
Danni Wyatt 35 (29); Hannah Rowe 2/12 (2 overs)		Sophie Devine 50 (41); Tash Farrant 2/32 (3.2 over)

New Zealand Women won by 4 wickets
County Cricket Ground, Hove
Umpires: Nigel Llong (Eng) and Martin Saggers (Eng)
Player of the match: Sophie Devine (NZ)

- New Zealand Women won the toss and elected to field.
- Maia Bouchier (Eng) made her WT20I debut.
- Sophie Devine (NZ) played in her 100th WT20I.

=== 3rd WT20I ===
9 September 2021
18:30 (N)
Scorecard

New Zealand; 144/4 (20 overs)	v	England; 145/6 (19.5 overs)
Sophie Devine 35 (33); Sarah Glenn 1/20 (4 overs)		Heather Knight 42 (36); Leigh Kasperek 3/25 (4 overs)

England Women won by 4 wickets
County Ground, Taunton
Umpires: Graham Lloyd (Eng) and Sue Redfern (Eng)
Player of the match: Heather Knight (Eng)

- England Women won the toss and elected to field.
- Heather Knight (Eng) played in her 200th international match.
- Suzie Bates (NZ) played in her 250th international match.

== WODI series ==
=== 1st WODI ===
16 September 2021
13:00 (D/N)
Scorecard

England; 241 (49.3 overs)	v	New Zealand; 211 (46.3 overs)
Heather Knight 89 (107); Jess Kerr 3/42 (9.3 overs)		Amy Satterthwaite 79* (87); Nat Sciver 2/10 (5 overs)

England Women won by 30 runs
Bristol County Ground, Bristol
Umpires: Paul Pollard (Eng) and Sue Redfern (Eng)
Player of the match: Heather Knight (Eng)

- New Zealand Women won the toss and elected to field.
- Charlie Dean (Eng) made her WODI debut.

=== 2nd WODI ===
19 September 2021
11:00
Scorecard

England; 197 (43.3 overs)	v	New Zealand; 169 (39 overs)
Danni Wyatt 63* (72); Leigh Kasperek 3/31 (7.3 overs)		Brooke Halliday 29 (42); Charlie Dean 4/36 (8 overs)

England Women won by 13 runs (DLS method)
New Road, Worcester
Umpires: Anna Harris (Eng) and David Millns (Eng)
Player of the match: Danni Wyatt (Eng)

- New Zealand Women won the toss and elected to field.
- New Zealand Women were set a revised target of 183 runs from 42 overs due to rain.
- Danni Wyatt (Eng) played in her 200th international match.

=== 3rd WODI ===
21 September 2021
13:00 (D/N)
Scorecard

England; 178 (48.3 overs)	v	New Zealand; 181/7 (45.5 overs)
Katherine Brunt 49* (98); Lea Tahuhu 5/37 (10 overs)		Maddy Green 70* (106); Katherine Brunt 4/22 (10 overs)

New Zealand Women won by 3 wickets
Grace Road, Leicester
Umpires: Paul Pollard (Eng) and Sue Redfern (Eng)
Player of the match: Maddy Green (NZ)

- New Zealand Women won the toss and elected to field.
- Molly Penfold (NZ) made her WODI debut.
- Lea Tahuhu (NZ) took her first five-wicket haul in WODIs.

=== 4th WODI ===
23 September 2021
13:00 (D/N)
Scorecard

New Zealand; 244/8 (50 overs)	v	England; 245/7 (49.3 overs)
Katey Martin 65* (83); Charlie Dean 3/52 (10 overs)		Heather Knight 101 (107); Hannah Rowe 4/47 (10 overs)

England Women won by 3 wickets
County Cricket Ground, Derby
Umpires: Anna Harris (Eng) and David Millns (Eng)
Player of the match: Heather Knight (Eng)

- England Women won the toss and elected to field.

=== 5th WODI ===
26 September 2021
11:00
Scorecard

England; 347/5 (50 overs)	v	New Zealand; 144 (35.2 overs)
Tammy Beaumont 102 (114); Hannah Rowe 2/65 (10 overs)		Lauren Down 27 (43); Heather Knight 3/24 (5 overs)

England Women won by 203 runs
St Lawrence Ground, Canterbury
Umpires: Paul Pollard (Eng) and Sue Redfern (Eng)
Player of the match: Tammy Beaumont (Eng)

- New Zealand Women won the toss and elected to field.
