= Mikaela Greig =

New Zealand cricketer (born 1995)

Personal information
- Full name: Mikaela Jane Greig
- Born: 22 April 1995 (age 31); Palmerston North, Manawatū New Zealand
- Batting: Right-handed
- Bowling: Right-arm off-break
- Role: All-rounder

International information
- National side: New Zealand (2024)
- Only T20I (cap 67): 19 March 2024 v England
- T20I shirt no.: 84

Domestic team information
- Years: Team
- 2013–2025: Central Districts (squad no. 4)

Career statistics
Competition	WLA	WT20
Matches	91	92
Runs scored	1,153	867
Batting average	18.30	13.54
100s/50s	0/6	0/0
Top score	84*	40
Balls bowled	1,714	602
Wickets	49	23
Bowling average	28.67	31.17
5 wickets in innings	2	0
10 wickets in match	0	0
Best bowling	7/56	3/33
Catches/stumpings	40/–	25/–
- Source: Cricinfo, 30 April 2025

Mikaela Franks (née Greig, born 22 April 1995) is a New Zealand former cricketer who played for Central Districts in domestic cricket. She played as a right-handed batter and right-arm off-break bowler. She appeared in one Twenty20 International for New Zealand in 2024.

== Early and personal life ==
Greig went to Levin Intermediate School and Waiopehu College in Levin before attending Massey University, from where she graduated in her late teens. She started her cricket career at the age of 11, and has regularly played for Central Hinds from the age of 18. She currently lives in Shannon. Greig become a dual international, having previous played for the Netherlands. Her mother Alison and her family always encouraged her to keep following her sporting passion.

Greig married Bradman Franks, a shearer, in March 2025. She owned a farm with her husband. After retirement from cricket she has focussed on work and farming. With her husband, she also runs a 1,000-hectare sheep farm. Greig also works for Beef + Lamb New Zealand as an extension manager in the western North Island, supporting farmers by facilitating some 60 events a year to upskill and educate 4,000 farmers between Wellington and New Plymouth.

== Career ==
=== Domestic career ===
Greig made her Twenty20 debut for Central Districts in the 2013–14 New Zealand Women's Twenty20 Competition, against Auckland. She made her List A debut against Canterbury on 18 January 2014 in 2013–14 New Zealand Women's One-Day Competition.

Greig took her maiden five-wicket haul in List A cricket in the 2015–16 New Zealand Women's One-Day Competition against Canterbury, when she took 7/56 from her 9 overs, helping Central Districts to win by 6 runs.

In 2019, she was appointed as captain of Central Districts in 2018/19 domestic season. She also played against senior men's team, which included semi-professional domestic contract.

In 2018–19 Hallyburton Johnstone Shield, she took her another five-wicket haul against Otago. She took 5/15, from her 4 overs, helping Central Districts to win by 247 runs. In the 2023–24 Hallyburton Johnstone Shield, she scored 232 runs from four games with an average of 77.33.

In April 2024, she was awarded Central Hinds Hallyburton Johnstone Shield Player of the Year and Central Hinds Players' Player of the Year.

In November 2024, she named as captain of Central Hinds for the 2024–25 Hallyburton Johnstone Shield tournament.

=== International career ===
In March 2024, Greig earned her call-up to the New Zealand squad for the first match of the T20I series against England. She joined Georgia Plimmer as replacement players for Sophie Devine and Amelia Kerr who were both unavailable for the series opener due to commitments with the WPL. Greig made her international debut in the Twenty20 International (T20I) against England on 19 March 2024. In March 2024, she was named in the New Zealand A squad against England A. In April 2024, she was added to the ODI squad as cover for the series against England. In June 2024, Greig was named in both ODI and T20I squads for a tour to against England.

=== Retirement ===
In April 2025, Greig announced her retirement from professional cricket, in order to focus on her current full time job as an Extension Manager for Beef + Lamb.

Thank you to everyone who has supported me, throughout my career.

I have made so many friendships in this time and the bonds and experiences that we shared together - those are the moments that I am always going to remember.

It really has been such a privilege to be part of this team, and I am looking forward to fangirling the Hinds from the sideline next season.

— Mikaela Greig, April 2025
