= Ryana MacDonald-Gay =

English cricketer

Personal information
- Full name: Ryana Lucelle MacDonald-Gay
- Born: 12 February 2004 (age 22); Maidstone, Kent, England
- Batting: Right-handed
- Bowling: Right-arm medium
- Role: All-rounder

International information
- National side: England
- Test debut (cap 170): 15 December 2024 v South Africa
- Last Test: 30 January 2025 v Australia
- ODI debut (cap 148): 7 September 2024 v Ireland
- Last ODI: 11 September 2024 v Ireland
- Only T20I (cap 67): 15 September 2024 v Ireland

Domestic team information
- Years: Team
- 2019–2024: Kent
- 2021–2024: South East Stars
- 2022–2025: Oval Invincibles
- 2026–present: Manchester Super Giants
- 2025–present: Surrey

Career statistics
Competition	WODI	WT20I	WLA	WT20
Matches	2	1	35	60
Runs scored	17	–	419	202
Batting average	17.00	–	19.04	13.46
100s/50s	0/0	–	0/2	0/0
Top score	17	–	54*	40*
Balls bowled	66	12	1,233	730
Wickets	1	1	50	51
Bowling average	52.00	25.00	20.20	17.50
5 wickets in innings	0	0	1	0
10 wickets in match	0	0	0	0
Best bowling	1/30	1/25	5/31	4/16
Catches/stumpings	1/–	0/–	17/–	16/–
- Source: CricketArchive, 18 October 2024

Ryana Lucelle MacDonald-Gay (born 12 February 2004) is an English cricketer who currently plays for Surrey and Manchester Super Giants. She plays as a right-handed batter and right-arm medium bowler.

== Early life ==
MacDonald-Gay was born on 12 February 2004 in Maidstone, Kent.

== Domestic career ==
MacDonald-Gay made her county debut in 2019, for Kent against Sussex, taking 1/22 from her 3 overs. In 2021, she appeared in six matches as Kent won the South East Group of the Twenty20 Cup. In 2022, she was Kent's leading wicket-taker in the Twenty20 Cup, with 10 wickets at an average of 9.00. She made both her Twenty20 high score and best bowling figures in the competition, scoring 40* against Surrey and taking 4/19 against Hampshire.

MacDonald-Gay was named in the South East Stars Academy squad for the 2021 season. On 4 August, she scored 65 in a 70-run victory for the Academy over Western Storm Academy. On 30 August, it was announced that MacDonald-Gay had signed a senior contract with South East Stars, and she made her full debut for the team later that day, in a Charlotte Edwards Cup match against Central Sparks. She went on to play two further matches for the side, in the Rachael Heyhoe Flint Trophy, taking two wickets. In 2022, she played five matches for the side, across the Charlotte Edwards Cup and the Rachael Heyhoe Flint Trophy, and made her maiden List A half-century, scoring 54* against Lightning, as well as taking six wickets. She also played every match in the victorious The Hundred campaign of Oval Invincibles, taking five wickets at an average of 14.20. At the end of the 2022 season, it was announced that MacDonald-Gay had signed her first professional contract with South East Stars.

In 2023, she was South East Stars' joint-second leading wicket-taker in the Rachael Heyhoe Flint Trophy, with 15 wickets at an average of 23.60. She also took 8 wickets for Oval Invincibles in The Hundred, including taking 4/16 against Manchester Originals. In 2024, she played 21 matches for South East Stars, across the Rachael Heyhoe Flint Trophy and the Charlotte Edwards Cup, taking 29 wickets with a best bowling of 5/31.

MacDonald-Gay was named Emerging Cricketer of the Year at the 2024 Cricket Writers' Club Awards.

On 27 May 2026, MacDonald-Gay took 6/11 against Durham in a T20 Blast match at The Oval to record the best bowling figures in women's domestic T20 cricket.

== International career ==
In October 2022, MacDonald-Gay was selected in the England Under-19 squad for the 2023 ICC Under-19 Women's T20 World Cup. She played six matches in the tournament, taking four wickets and scoring 72 runs.

On 25 June 2024, MacDonald-Gay received her first call-up to the senior England squad for a home three-match one-day international series against New Zealand.

After not playing in the New Zealand series, MacDonald-Gay made her One Day International debut for England against Ireland at Stormont in Belfast on 7 September 2024, taking 1/30 in the eight overs she bowled.

She received a late call-up into the Test match squad for England's multi-format tour of South Africa in November 2024. MacDonald-Gay was selected in the starting XI to make her Test match debut on 15 December 2024. Having taken two wickets during the game, she was included in the England squad for the Test match part of the 2025 Women's Ashes series in Australia.
