= Maia Bouchier =

English cricketer (born 1998)

Personal information
- Full name: Maia Emily Bouchier
- Born: 5 December 1998 (age 27); Kensington, Greater London, England
- Batting: Right-handed
- Bowling: Right-arm medium
- Role: Batter

International information
- National side: England
- Test debut (cap 169): 15 December 2024 v South Africa
- Last Test: 10 July 2026 v India
- ODI debut (cap 142): 9 September 2023 v Sri Lanka
- Last ODI: 30 June 2024 v New Zealand
- T20I debut (cap 52): 4 September 2021 v New Zealand
- Last T20I: 11 July 2024 v New Zealand
- T20I shirt no.: 14

Domestic team information
- Years: Team
- 2014–2018: Middlesex
- 2017/18: Auckland
- 2018–2024: Southern Vipers
- 2019–present: Hampshire
- 2021–present: Southern Brave
- 2021/22: Melbourne Stars
- 2021/22: Western Australia
- 2023/24–present: Melbourne Stars

Career statistics
| Competition | WODI | WT20I | WLA | WT20 |
|---|---|---|---|---|
| Matches | 12 | 39 | 113 | 192 |
| Runs scored | 542 | 645 | 3,476 | 3,140 |
| Batting average | 52.37 | 24.80 | 36.58 | 21.36 |
| 100s/50s | 2/3 | 0/3 | 5/23 | 0/9 |
| Top score | 123* | 91 | 143* | 93 |
| Balls bowled | – | – | 568 | 234 |
| Wickets | – | – | 16 | 12 |
| Bowling average | – | – | 24.31 | 19.66 |
| 5 wickets in innings | – | – | 0 | 0 |
| 10 wickets in match | – | – | 0 | 0 |
| Best bowling | – | – | 3/24 | 3/18 |
| Catches/stumpings | 3/– | 9/– | 33/– | 81/– |
- Source: CricketArchive, 18 October 2024

Maia Emily Bouchier (/ˈbuːʃieɪ/ BOO-shee-ay; born 5 December 1998) is an English cricketer who currently plays for Hampshire, Southern Brave and Melbourne Stars. She plays as a right-handed batter and bowls occasional right-arm medium pace. She has previously played for Middlesex, Southern Vipers, Auckland and Western Australia. She made her international debut for the England women's cricket team in September 2021.

== Early life ==
Bouchier was born in Kensington, Greater London. Her mother is Iranian. She attended the Dragon School, Rugby School, and then Oxford Brookes University.

== Domestic career ==
=== County cricket ===
Bouchier made her county debut for Middlesex in 2014, against Warwickshire. The 3/24 she took on her debut remains her List A best bowling. She became a regular in the side from 2016, and had her most successful season for Middlesex in 2018: she was their leading run-scorer in the Championship, with 172 runs at 34.40, and was ever-present as her side won the Twenty20 Cup. She also hit what was at the time her List A high score in the Championship, scoring 76 against Somerset.

In 2019, Bouchier moved to Hampshire. She had a successful first season with the club, hitting two half-centuries and ending the season as the side's highest run-scorer in the Twenty20 Cup. In 2021, she scored just 28 runs in four innings in the 2021 Women's Twenty20 Cup. In the 2022 Women's Twenty20 Cup, she was Hampshire's leading run-scorer, with 149 runs including 73 made against Sussex.

=== Regional cricket ===
Bouchier also played for Southern Vipers in the Women's Cricket Super League in 2018 and 2019. She played all 11 matches for the side in 2019, helping them reach Finals Day and hitting 114 runs overall, with a best of 40 against Lancashire Thunder.

Bouchier continued playing for Southern Vipers in the 2020 Rachael Heyhoe Flint Trophy. She appeared in all 7 matches, including her side's 38-run victory in the Final over Northern Diamonds. She scored 183 runs at an average of 30.50, as well as taking 1 wicket, the key dismissal of Lauren Winfield-Hill in the Final. She scored one half-century, 50* in a victory over Western Storm. In October 2020, it was announced that Bouchier had been suspended from bowling due to an illegal elbow extension in her action, and would have to undergo remedial work. She was cleared to resume bowling in competitive cricket in July 2021.

In 2021, Bouchier scored 195 runs at an average of 32.50 in the Rachael Heyhoe Flint Trophy as her side defended their title, as well as scoring 104 runs at an average of 52.00 in the Charlotte Edwards Cup. She also played for Southern Brave in The Hundred, scoring 92 runs with a strike rate of 143.75. In 2022, she was ever-present in Southern Vipers' victorious Charlotte Edwards Cup campaign, scoring 176 runs in seven matches. She also played five matches for the side in the Rachael Heyhoe Flint Trophy, scoring 128 runs including one half-century. In The Hundred, she was ever-present for Southern Brave, scoring 88 runs in 8 matches.

In 2023, she played 15 matches for Southern Vipers, across the Rachael Heyhoe Flint Trophy and the Charlotte Edwards Cup, making five half-centuries. She also scored 268 runs at an average of 38.28, including one half-century, for Southern Brave in The Hundred. In 2024, she played eight matches for Southern Vipers, across the Rachael Heyhoe Flint Trophy and the Charlotte Edwards Cup, scoring one half-century.

=== Overseas cricket ===
Bouchier spent one season, 2017/18, playing for Auckland. She was most successful in the Hallyburton Johnstone Shield, scoring 273 runs at an average of 45.50 with two half-centuries. Her side also won the competition.

In September 2021, Bouchier signed for the Melbourne Stars for the 2021–22 Women's Big Bash League season. She played all 12 matches for the side, scoring 185 runs with a high score of 42, made against Hobart Hurricanes. In February 2022, it was announced that Bouchier had joined Western Australia for their Women's National Cricket League campaign. She played six matches for the side in the tournament, scoring 130 runs including making her List A high score, with 79 against Queensland. She re-joined Melbourne Stars for the 2023–24 Women's Big Bash League season, scoring 216 runs at an average of 15.42.

== International career ==
In August 2021, Bouchier was named in England's Women's Twenty20 International (WT20I) squad for their series against New Zealand. However, Bouchier was ruled out of the first WT20I match of the three-match series after being identified as a possible COVID-19 contact. She made her WT20I debut in the next match, on 4 September 2021, for England against New Zealand, scoring 25 from 24 balls. She went on to play the final match of the series as England secured a 2–1 victory. She was later added to the WODI squad ahead of the third match of the series, but was released before the fifth match to enable her to play in the Rachael Heyhoe Flint Trophy final.

In December 2021, Bouchier was named in England's squad for their tour to Australia to contest the Women's Ashes. She appeared in one match on the tour, the first WT20I, but did not bat. In July 2022, she was named in England's squad for their T20I series against South Africa and the cricket tournament at the 2022 Commonwealth Games in Birmingham, England. She played every match across the two series, including making 21* to see England to victory over Sri Lanka in the Commonwealth Games. In December 2022, she played every match in England's T20I series against the West Indies, scoring 31 runs in three innings.

In January 2023, Bouchier was named in England's squad for the 2023 ICC Women's T20 World Cup, although she did not play a match at the tournament. She was named in England's squad for the T20I series during the 2023 Women's Ashes, but did not play a match. Later that summer, she was named in England's squad for their series against Sri Lanka. She made her One Day International debut during the 1st ODI of the series, and scored 95 from 65 deliveries during the 3rd ODI. In December 2023, she was awarded her first central contract with England.

She scored her first century in ODIs for England against New Zealand on 30 June 2024. She was named in the England squad for the 2024 ICC Women's T20 World Cup.

Bouchier was named in England's travelling party for their multi-format tour to South Africa in November 2024, including her first inclusion in a Test match squad. During the series, she made her Test match debut, scoring 126 in her first innings in the format.

She was named in the England squad for the 2025 Women's Ashes series in Australia.

== Personal life ==
Bouchier is gay. While at school, she was the target of homophobic bullying. As of June 2023, she is in a relationship with British international beach volleyball athlete and sports therapist Jess Grimson. They met at the 2022 Commonwealth Games in Birmingham. They live together in Bournemouth.
