= Rhianna Southby =

English cricketer (born 2000)

Personal information
- Full name: Rhianna Mae Southby
- Born: 16 October 2000 (age 26); Hounslow, Greater London, England
- Batting: Right-handed
- Role: Wicket-keeper

Domestic team information
- Years: Team
- 2016–2023: Surrey
- 2018–2019: Surrey Stars
- 2020–2022: South East Stars
- 2021: Oval Invincibles
- 2023–2024: Southern Vipers
- 2023–2025: Southern Brave
- 2025: Hampshire
- 2026: Welsh Fire

Career statistics
Competition	WLA	WT20
Matches	77	95
Runs scored	731	686
Batting average	16.24	17.58
100s/50s	0/3	0/4
Top score	72	64
Catches/stumpings	42/24	30/48
- Source: CricketArchive, 25 August 2025

Rhianna Mae Southby (born 16 October 2000) is an English cricketer who currently plays for Hampshire and Welsh Fire. She plays as a wicket-keeper and right-handed batter. She previously played for Surrey Stars, South East Stars, Southern Vipers, Oval Invincibles and Southern Brave.

== Domestic career ==
Southby made her county debut in 2016, for Surrey against Warwickshire, in which she took one catch and made one stumping. The same season, she played four matches in the Twenty20 Cup, in which Surrey won promotion to Division 1. Two seasons later, Southby was ever-present as Surrey won promotion to Division 1 of the County Championship. In 2021, Southby scored 78 runs in the Twenty20 Cup, with a high score of 32. She scored 96 runs in the 2022 Women's Twenty20 Cup, including her maiden Twenty20 half-century, scoring 50 against Hampshire.

Southby was also part of the Surrey Stars squad in the Women's Cricket Super League in 2018 and 2019. She played three matches across the two seasons, and made two stumpings.

In 2020, Southby played for South East Stars in the Rachael Heyhoe Flint Trophy. She appeared in all six matches, scoring 32 runs, taking 1 catch and making 3 stumpings. In 2021, she played three matches in the Rachael Heyhoe Flint Trophy, as well as being part of the Oval Invincibles winning squad in The Hundred. In 2022, she played five matches for South East Stars, all in the Rachael Heyhoe Flint Trophy, scoring 85 runs including her maiden List A half-century, scoring 54 against Western Storm. At the end of the 2022 season, it was announced that Southby had joined Southern Vipers. In April 2023, it was announced that Southby had signed a professional contract with her new side.

In 2023, she played 14 matches for Southern Vipers, all in the Rachael Heyhoe Flint Trophy, taking ten catches and completing five stumpings. She also played nine matches for Southern Brave in The Hundred, achieving 11 dismissals. She was named Player of the Match during Brave's victory over Northern Superchargers, as she took two catches and completed two stumpings. In 2024, she played 24 matches for Southern Vipers, across the Rachael Heyhoe Flint Trophy and the Charlotte Edwards Cup, making 23 dismissals.
