= Charlie Dean =

English cricketer (born 2000)

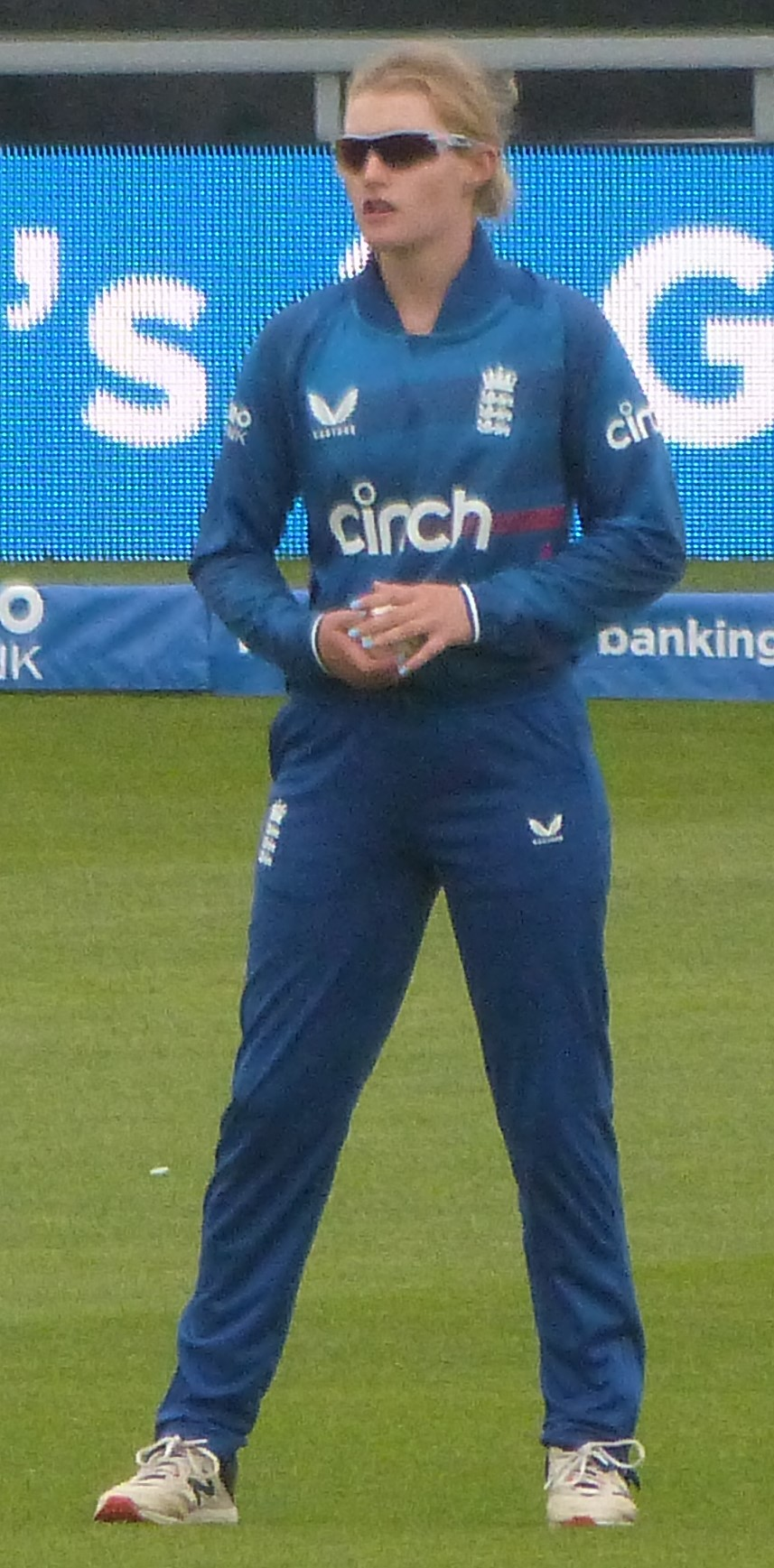
- Dean bowling for England in July 2023

Personal information
- Full name: Charlotte Ellen Dean
- Born: 22 December 2000 (age 25); Burton upon Trent, Staffordshire, England
- Nickname: Deano
- Batting: Right-handed
- Bowling: Right-arm off break
- Role: All-rounder
- Relatives: Steven Dean (father)

International information
- National side: England (2021–present)
- Test debut (cap 162): 27 January 2022 v Australia
- Last Test: 15 December 2024 v South Africa
- ODI debut (cap 136): 16 September 2021 v New Zealand
- Last ODI: 16 May 2026 v New Zealand
- T20I debut (cap 53): 22 January 2022 v Australia
- Last T20I: 5 July 2026 v Australia
- T20I shirt no.: 24

Domestic team information
- Years: Team
- 2016–2024: Hampshire
- 2017–2024: Southern Vipers
- 2021–present: London Spirit
- 2025: Royal Challengers Bengaluru
- 2025–present: Somerset

Career statistics
Competition	WTest	WODI	WT20I
Matches	3	56	58
Runs scored	41	556	172
Batting average	8.20	24.17	15.63
100s/50s	0/0	0/0	0/0
Top score	20*	47	34
Balls bowled	408	2,556	1,219
Wickets	7	86	77
Bowling average	35.57	23.31	18.32
5 wickets in innings	0	1	0
10 wickets in match	0	0	0
Best bowling	4/68	5/31	4/19
Catches/stumpings	0/–	24/–	14/–
Medal record
Women's cricket
Representing England
T20 World Cup
Runner-up	2026 England
- Source: CricketArchive, 6 July 2026

Charlotte Ellen Dean (born 22 December 2000) is an English cricketer and the vice-captain of the England women's national team. An all-rounder, she is a right-handed batter and right-arm off break bowler. She made her international debut for the England women's cricket team in September 2021.

== Early life ==
Dean was born on 22 December 2000 in Burton upon Trent, Staffordshire. She was introduced to cricket by her father. Her father, Steven, played cricket for Staffordshire and Warwickshire. She took five wickets on her debut for the Portsmouth Grammar School boys’ first XI in 2017, a year after captaining Hampshire Under-15s to victory in the Royal London County Cup.

== Domestic career ==
Dean made her county debut in 2016, for Hampshire against Staffordshire. She hit her maiden county half-century later that season, scoring 54 against Essex. In 2017, she helped her side to promotion to Division 1 in the County Championship, scoring 206 runs at an average of 29.42, as well as taking 13 wickets, the most for the side. In 2018, Hampshire won Division 1 of the County Championship, with Dean contributing 163 runs, including her List A high score of 73 against Kent. She also took 4/4 against Gloucestershire that season, which at the time was her Twenty20 best bowling figures. In 2019, Dean scored 142 runs at an average of 20.28 and took 11 wickets at an average of 15.54 in the County Championship. She scored 95 runs and took 7 wickets at an average of 11.57 in the 2021 Women's Twenty20 Cup.

Dean also played for Southern Vipers in the Women's Cricket Super League between 2017 and 2019. She played 7 matches across the three seasons, scoring 7 runs overall and taking 1 wicket, in 2017 against Lancashire Thunder.

In 2020, Dean continued playing for Southern Vipers in the Rachael Heyhoe Flint Trophy. She appeared in all seven matches as the side won the competition, scoring 180 runs at an average of 45.00 and taking 9 wickets at an average of 29.88. She scored 60* in the away match against Western Storm, and took 3/50 in the return match against the same team. In 2021, Dean played four matches in the Vipers' successful defence of the Rachael Heyhoe Flint Trophy, taking 10 wickets at an average of 13.80. She also played four matches in the Charlotte Edwards Cup, and took 5/19 in the first match of the tournament, which largely helped the Vipers bowl out Central Sparks for just 83. This was Dean's maiden five-wicket haul. She was also ever-present for London Spirit in The Hundred, scoring 44 runs and taking 6 wickets. At the end of the 2021 season, it was announced that Dean had signed a professional contract with Southern Vipers. In 2022, she was Southern Vipers' leading wicket-taker in the Charlotte Edwards Cup, with 12 wickets at an average of 8.25, as well as taking 5 wickets and scoring 49 runs in four matches in the Rachael Heyhoe Flint Trophy. In The Hundred, she became captain of London Spirit to replace the injured Heather Knight. She played all six matches for the side, scoring 38 runs but taking no wickets.

In 2023, she played 12 matches for Southern Vipers, across the Rachael Heyhoe Flint Trophy and the Charlotte Edwards Cup, taking 18 wickets. She also played six matches for London Spirit in The Hundred, taking five wickets at an average of 22.00. In 2024, she played nine matches for Southern Vipers, across the Rachael Heyhoe Flint Trophy and the Charlotte Edwards Cup, scoring one half-century and taking 15 wickets.

Dean joined Somerset in November 2024.

== International career ==
In August 2021, Dean was named in England's Women's Twenty20 International (WT20I) squad for their series against New Zealand. However, Dean was ruled out of the first WT20I match after being identified as a possible COVID-19 contact. The following month, Dean was named in England's Women's One Day International (WODI) squad, also for the matches against New Zealand. She made her WODI debut on 16 September 2021, for England against New Zealand. She went on to be the joint-leading wicket-taker in the five-match series, with 10 wickets, including taking 4/36 in the 2nd ODI to help England to a 13-run victory.

In December 2021, Dean was named in England's squad for their tour to Australia to contest the Women's Ashes. She made her Women's Twenty20 International (WT20I) debut on 20 January 2022, for England against Australia, although the match was abandoned after 4.1 overs due to rain. She made her Women's Test match debut on 27 January 2022, for England against Australia in the one-off Women's Ashes Test. She dismissed Beth Mooney to claim her first Test wicket, and ended with figures of 2/24 in Australia's second innings. She also appeared in two of the WODIs on the tour, but failed to take a wicket.

In February 2022, she was named in England's squad for the 2022 Women's Cricket World Cup in New Zealand. She played six matches in the tournament as England reached the final, and was the seventh-highest wicket-taker in the competition, with 11 wickets. She took her ODI career-best bowling figures in her second match of the tournament, taking 4/23 against India.

In July 2022, Dean was the leading wicket-taker in England's ODI series against South Africa, with 8 wickets at an average of 18.62. In September 2022, she played all three matches of England's ODI series against India, taking three wickets and scoring 108 runs. In the third ODI at Lord's, Dean made her ODI high score of 47 before being run out at the non-striker's end, the last wicket to fall with England short of their target by 17 runs. The following day, in the Rachael Heyhoe Flint Trophy final, Dean "playfully" pretended to recreate the run out whilst bowling. In November 2022, Dean was awarded with her first England central contract.

In December 2022, Dean was England's leading wicket-taker in both their ODI and T20I series against the West Indies, with seven and eleven wickets, respectively. She was also named Player of the Series in the T20I series. In January 2023, Dean was named in England's squad for the 2023 ICC Women's T20 World Cup. She played all five of England's matches at the tournament, taking four wickets at an average of 32.75.

She played three matches in the 2023 Women's Ashes series, taking four wickets. Later that summer, she was named in England's squad for their series against Sri Lanka. She took her maiden international five-wicket haul in the 3rd ODI, with 5/31. In December 2023, she was in England's squad for their tour of India, playing two T20Is and the only Test match. She took five wickets in the Test match, including 4/68 in the second innings.

In April 2024, during the 1st ODI on England's tour of New Zealand, Dean became the fastest bowler to take 50 WODI wickets, doing so in 26 matches. In the same match, alongside Amy Jones, she also broke the record for the highest 7th wicket partnership in WODIs with an unbroken 130-run stand. Dean rounded off an eventful month by moving up to number two in the ICC Women's ODI bowling rankings.

In June, Dean took 4/38 in nine overs as England defeated New Zealand by nine wickets at the Riverside Ground, Chester-le-Street, in the first ODI of a three-match series.

She was named in the England squad for the 2024 ICC Women's T20 World Cup.

Dean was named in England's squad for their multi-format tour to South Africa in November 2024. She became the third English woman to take an ODI hat-trick as England won the second match of the series. The wickets were split across two overs, with Dean and her teammates not realising she had taken a hatrick until after the innings had finished.

She was named in the England squad for the 2025 Women's Ashes series in Australia.

In 2025, prior to the 2025 Women's Cricket World Cup, Dean was named vice-captain of the England team following her success captaining London Spirit in The Hundred earlier in the year.
