= Lauren Bell =

English cricketer

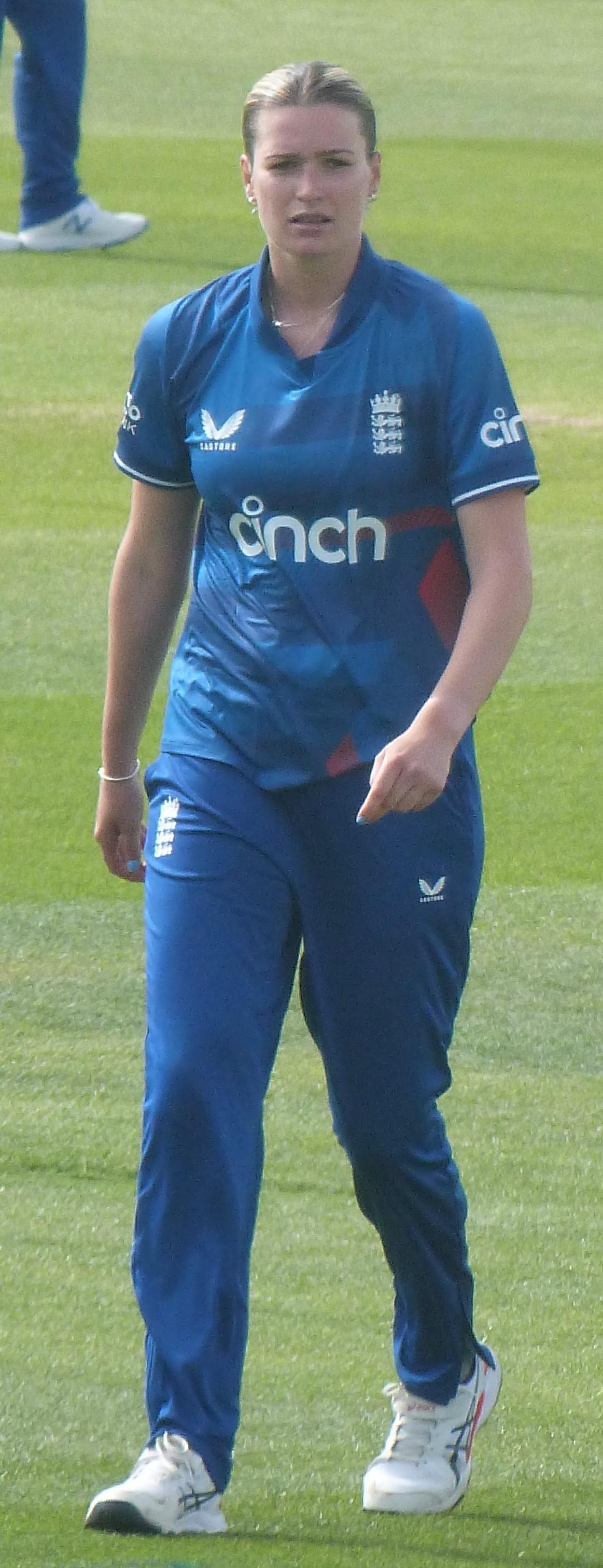
- Bell bowling for England in July 2023

Personal information
- Full name: Lauren Katie Bell
- Born: 2 January 2001 (age 25); Swindon, Wiltshire, England
- Nickname: The Shard
- Height: 6 ft 0 in (1.83 m)
- Batting: Right-handed
- Bowling: Right-arm fast
- Role: Bowler

International information
- National side: England (2022–present)
- Test debut (cap 163): 27 June 2022 v South Africa
- Last Test: 10 July 2026 v India
- ODI debut (cap 138): 15 July 2022 v South Africa
- Last ODI: 29 October 2025 v South Africa
- T20I debut (cap 57): 10 September 2022 v India
- Last T20I: 9 July 2025 v India
- T20I shirt no.: 63

Domestic team information
- Years: Team
- 2015–2021: Berkshire
- 2019: → Middlesex (on loan)
- 2018–2024: Southern Vipers
- 2021–present: Southern Brave
- 2023–2024: UP Warriorz
- 2023/24: Sydney Thunder
- 2025: Hampshire
- 2026 – present: Royal Challengers Bengaluru

Career statistics
Competition	WTest	WODI	WT20I	WLA
Matches	5	33	41	80
Runs scored	19	58	3	253
Batting average	9.50	8.29	1.50	8.72
100s/50s	0/0	0/0	0/0	0/0
Top score	8	12	2	36
Balls bowled	750	1557	890	2,852
Wickets	18	49	60	115
Bowling average	24.11	28.8	17.75	24.80
5 wickets in innings	0	1	0	1
10 wickets in match	0	0	0	0
Best bowling	4/27	5/37	4/12	5/37
Catches/stumpings	2/–	10/–	8/–	17/–
Medal record
Women's cricket
Representing England
T20 World Cup
Runner-up	2026 England
- Source: CricketArchive, 29 October 2025

Lauren Katie Bell (born 2 January 2001) is an English International cricketer who plays for England in all formats of the game. She also plays for Royal Challengers Bengaluru in the WPL. Hampshire and Southern Brave. She has previously played for Berkshire, Southern Vipers, UP Warriorz, Sydney Thunder and Middlesex. Bell made her international debut for the England women's cricket team in June 2022.

== Personal and early life ==
Until the age of 16, Bell played football for Reading FC's Academy.

Bell is nicknamed The Shard because of her height, standing at 6 feet (1.8 m). Her sister Colette has played for Berkshire and Buckinghamshire. She was educated at Bradfield College in Berkshire.

Bell graduated from Loughborough University with a joint honours degree in Sociology and Criminology in 2022.

== Domestic career ==
Bell has played for Hungerford Cricket Club, and was the first girl to play for the Bradfield College 1st XI. In 2015, at the age of 14, Bell made her Women's County Championship debut for Berkshire. She made eight appearances in the 2015 season, taking seven wickets. In 2019, Berkshire loaned Bell to Middlesex for the Twenty20 Cup. Her final game for Berkshire was in 2021.

In 2018, Bell made her debut for the Southern Vipers in the Women's Cricket Super League. She played for the Vipers in the 2019 Women's Cricket Super League final, where they lost to Western Storm. In 2020, she was included in the Vipers squad for the Rachael Heyhoe Flint Trophy. In December 2020, Bell was one of 41 women's cricketers given a full-time domestic cricket contract.

Bell was signed for Southern Brave for The Hundred; the 2020 season was cancelled due to the COVID-19 pandemic, and Bell was retained by the Brave for the 2021 season. In April 2022, she was bought by Southern Brave for the 2022 season of The Hundred.

Bell signed for the UP Warriorz for the inaugural season of the Women's Premier League.

Following the restructuring of English women's cricket teams for the 2025 season, Bell signed for Hampshire.

In WPL 2026, she was signed by Royal Challengers Bengaluru and became a fan favourite due to her stellar bowling performances. She emerged as one of the best bowlers in powerplay, getting early wickets for her team in almost every match. She finished with figures of 3 for 29 in a critical game against Gujarat Giants to set up a big win for Royal Challengers Bengaluru.

In the game against Delhi Capitals, Lauren Bell took 2 wickets in the very first over of the match by dismissing Lizelle Lee & Laura Wolvaardt, once again setting up the platform for a big win for Royal Challengers Bengaluru.

== International career ==
In 2019, Bell played for the England women's Academy against Australia A. She was given an academy contract for the 2019–20 season. In 2020, she was one of the 24 women chosen by England to begin training during the COVID-19 pandemic. Bell was one of three uncapped players in the training squad; the others were Emma Lamb and Issy Wong.

In December 2021, Bell was named in England's A squad for their tour to Australia, with the matches being played alongside the Women's Ashes. In January 2022, during the tour, she was added to the full England squad for the one-off Test match. In February 2022, she was named as one of two reserve players in England's team for the 2022 Women's Cricket World Cup in New Zealand.

In June 2022, Bell was named in England's Women's Test squad for their one-off match against South Africa. She made her Test debut on 27 June 2022, for England against South Africa. On 2 July 2022, Bell was also named in England's Women's One Day International (WODI) squad for their matches against South Africa. She made her WODI debut on 15 July 2022, also for England against South Africa. In November 2022, Bell was awarded with her first England central contract.

In 2023 Bell was named in the England squad for the Ashes against Australia. She played in the test match, three T20I matches and three One Day Internationals.

She took her first five-wicket haul in WODIs for England against New Zealand on 3 July 2024.

She was named in the England squad for the 2024 ICC Women's T20 World Cup.

Bell was named in England's squad for their multi-format tour to South Africa in November 2024.

She was named in the England squad for the 2025 Women's Ashes series in Australia.
