= 2023 Southern Vipers season =

English cricket season

Southern Vipers
2023 season
- Coach: Charlotte Edwards
- Captain: Georgia Adams
- Overseas player: (Australia) Nicole Faltum (Australia) Maitlan Brown
- RHFT: Champions
- CEC: Champions
- Most runs: RHFT: Georgia Adams (546); CEC: Danni Wyatt (249)
- Most wickets: RHFT: Georgia Adams (20); CEC: Anya Shrubsole (13) & Linsey Smith (13)
- Most catches: RHFT: Georgia Adams (11); CEC: Georgia Elwiss (7)
- Most wicket-keeping dismissals: RHFT: Rhianna Southby (15); CEC: Nicole Faltum (10)

The 2023 season saw Southern Vipers compete in the 50 over Rachael Heyhoe Flint Trophy and the Twenty20 Charlotte Edwards Cup. The side won both competitions, completing the domestic double: in the Charlotte Edwards Cup, the side finished second in the group before defeating North West Thunder in the play-off and The Blaze in the final, whilst in the Rachael Heyhoe Flint Trophy the side won the initial group stage before again defeating The Blaze in the final.

The side was captained by Georgia Adams and coached by Charlotte Edwards. They played four home matches at the Rose Bowl, three at the County Ground, Hove, two at Arundel Castle Cricket Ground, and one apiece at Newclose County Cricket Ground and Falkland Cricket Club.

== Squad ==
=== Departures ===
On 4 November 2022, it was announced that Paige Scholfield and Tara Norris had left the side, joining South East Stars and North West Thunder respectively. On 9 December 2022, Carla Rudd announced her retirement from all forms of cricket. On 21 April 2023, the side announced their squad for the season, confirming the departures of Ella Chandler, Ariana Dowse and Gemma Lane. On 4 June 2023, it was announced that Chloe Hill had joined South East Stars on loan for June and July. After the end of the Charlotte Edwards Cup on 11 June 2023, Anya Shrubsole announced her retirement from regional cricket. On 31 August 2023, Chloe Hill's loan to South East Stars was renewed for the remainder of the season.

=== Arrivals ===
On 2 November 2022, it was announced that Linsey Smith had joined the side from Northern Diamonds, and had signed a professional contract. Smith had previously played for Vipers during the Women's Cricket Super League in 2016 and 2017. On 7 November 2022, it was announced that the side had signed Chloe Hill (who had previously been signed on loan in 2022) and Rhianna Southby, from Central Sparks and South East Stars respectively. On 21 April 2023, the side announced their squad for the season, confirming the addition of Sophie Mitchelmore. On 5 May 2023, it was confirmed that Nicole Faltum had joined the side as an overseas player. On 1 July 2023, Ava Lee, Abi Norgrove and Megan Sturge were all named in a matchday squad for the first time. On 6 July 2023, the side announced the signing of Maitlan Brown as an overseas player, for four Rachael Heyhoe Flint Trophy matches.

=== Personnel and contract changes ===
On 7 November 2022, it was announced that Emily Windsor, Ella McCaughan, Georgia Elwiss and Anya Shrubsole had signed their first professional contracts with the side. On 11 April 2023, Southern Vipers announced the awarding of five further professional contracts, each six months in length, to Alice Monaghan, Charlotte Taylor, Nancy Harman, Chloe Hill and Rhianna Southby.

=== Squad list ===
- Age given is at the start of Southern Vipers' first match of the season (22 April 2023).

| Name | Nationality | Birth date | Batting Style | Bowling Style | Notes |
Batters
| Maia Bouchier | England | 5 December 1998 (aged 24) | Right-handed | Right-arm medium | |
| Ella McCaughan | England | 26 September 2002 (aged 20) | Right-handed | Right-arm leg break | |
| Abi Norgrove | England | 17 January 2006 (aged 17) | Right-handed | Right-arm off break | Joined July 2023 |
| Emily Windsor | England | 14 June 1997 (aged 25) | Right-handed | Right-arm medium | |
All-rounders
| Georgia Adams | England | 4 October 1993 (aged 29) | Right-handed | Right-arm off break | Captain |
| Charlie Dean | England | 22 December 2000 (aged 22) | Right-handed | Right-arm off break | |
| Georgia Elwiss | England | 31 May 1991 (aged 31) | Right-handed | Right-arm medium | |
| Freya Kemp | England | 21 April 2005 (aged 18) | Left-handed | Left-arm medium | |
| Sophie Mitchelmore | England | 21 January 2001 (aged 22) | Right-handed | Right-arm medium | |
| Alice Monaghan | England | 20 March 2000 (aged 23) | Right-handed | Right-arm medium | |
| Megan Sturge | England | 3 November 2004 (aged 18) | Right-handed | Right-arm off break | Joined July 2023 |
| Mary Taylor | England | 7 October 2004 (aged 18) | Right-handed | Right-arm medium | |
| Danni Wyatt | England | 22 April 1991 (aged 32) | Right-handed | Right-arm off break | |
Wicket-keepers
| Nicole Faltum | Australia | 17 January 2000 (aged 23) | Right-handed | Right-arm leg break | Overseas player; May to September 2023 |
| Chloe Hill | England | 3 January 1997 (aged 26) | Right-handed | — | Two loan spells to South East Stars; June-July 2023 and September 2023 |
| Rhianna Southby | England | 16 October 2000 (aged 22) | Right-handed | — | |
Bowlers
| Lauren Bell | England | 2 January 2001 (aged 22) | Right-handed | Right-arm fast-medium | |
| Maitlan Brown | Australia | 5 June 1997 (aged 25) | Right-handed | Right-arm medium | Overseas player; July 2023 |
| Nancy Harman | England | 11 July 1999 (aged 23) | Right-handed | Right-arm leg break | |
| Ava Lee | England | 26 August 2005 (aged 17) | Right-handed | Right-arm off break | Joined July 2023 |
| Anya Shrubsole | England | 7 December 1991 (aged 31) | Right-handed | Right-arm fast-medium | Retired from regional cricket in June 2023 |
| Linsey Smith | England | 10 March 1995 (aged 28) | Left-handed | Slow left-arm orthodox | |
| Charlotte Taylor | England | 2 February 1994 (aged 29) | Right-handed | Right-arm off break | |
| Finty Trussler | England | 8 May 2003 (aged 19) | Right-handed | Right-arm leg break | |

== Rachael Heyhoe Flint Trophy ==
=== Season standings ===
| Pos | Team | Pld | W | L | T | NR | BP | Pts | NRR |
|---|---|---|---|---|---|---|---|---|---|
| 1 | Southern Vipers (Q) | 14 | 7 | 4 | 1 | 2 | 4 | 38 | 0.457 |
| 2 | The Blaze (Q) | 14 | 7 | 4 | 0 | 3 | 4 | 38 | 0.173 |
| 3 | South East Stars (Q) | 14 | 7 | 6 | 0 | 1 | 6 | 36 | 0.583 |
| 4 | Sunrisers | 14 | 6 | 5 | 0 | 3 | 2 | 32 | −0.006 |
| 5 | Central Sparks | 14 | 6 | 5 | 1 | 2 | 1 | 31 | −0.233 |
| 6 | Northern Diamonds | 14 | 6 | 7 | 0 | 1 | 4 | 30 | −0.034 |
| 7 | North West Thunder | 14 | 3 | 5 | 2 | 4 | 2 | 26 | −0.274 |
| 8 | Western Storm | 14 | 2 | 8 | 0 | 4 | 0 | 16 | −1.068 |

Source: England and Wales Cricket Board

advanced to the final advanced to the play-off

=== Fixtures ===
22 April 2023
10:30
Scorecard

| Sunrisers; 288/7 (50 overs) | v | Southern Vipers; 162 (35.2 overs) |
| Mady Villiers 70 (53); Linsey Smith 3/50 (10 overs) | | Maia Bouchier 57 (48); Abtaha Maqsood 5/30 (9.2 overs) |

Sunrisers won by 126 runs
Rose Bowl, Southampton
Umpires: Billy Taylor and Sophie McLelland

- Sunrisers won the toss and elected to bat.
- Points: Sunrisers 5, Southern Vipers 0

29 April 2023
10:30
Scorecard

| Southern Vipers; 287/6 (20 overs) | v | South East Stars; 129 (36.5 overs) |
| Ella McCaughan 67 (95); Alice Davidson-Richards 2/30 (6 overs) | | Paige Scholfield 31 (63); Lauren Bell 4/37 (8 overs) |

Southern Vipers won by 158 runs
County Ground, Beckenham
Umpires: Rose Dovey and Sue Redfern

- Southern Vipers won the toss and elected to bat.
- Points: Southern Vipers 5, South East Stars 0

1 May 2023
10:30
Scorecard

| Central Sparks; 183/9 (50 overs) | v | Southern Vipers; 184/7 (41.1 overs) |
| Ami Campbell 54 (76); Georgia Adams 4/30 (10 overs) | | Georgia Adams 50 (71); Emily Arlott 2/23 (9 overs) |

Southern Vipers won by 3 wickets
Sir Paul Getty's Ground, Wormsley
Umpires: Anna Harris and Tom Lungley

- Southern Vipers won the toss and elected to field.
- Points: Southern Vipers 4, Central Sparks 0

6 May 2023
10:30
Scorecard

| Southern Vipers | v | Western Storm |

Match abandoned
County Ground, Hove

- No toss.
- No play was possible due to rain.
- Points: Southern Vipers 2, Western Storm 2

10 May 2023
10:30
Scorecard

| Southern Vipers; 180 (47.2 overs) | v | Central Sparks; 183/4 (41.2 overs) |
| Ella McCaughan 59 (90); Erin Burns 5/36 (10 overs) | | Evelyn Jones 73 (124); Georgia Elwiss 2/27 (10 overs) |

Central Sparks won by 6 wickets
County Ground, Hove
Umpires: Paul Nicholls and Chris Watts

- Central Sparks won the toss and elected to field.
- Points: Central Sparks 4, Southern Vipers 0

2 July 2023
10:30
Scorecard

| Sunrisers; 254 (49.2 overs) | v | Southern Vipers; 226 (46.3 overs) |
| Jodi Grewcock 76 (101); Georgia Elwiss 3/37 (10 overs) | | Emily Windsor 84 (107); Jodi Grewcock 4/45 (10 overs) |

Sunrisers won by 28 runs
County Ground, Chelmsford
Umpires: Amy Clark and Neil Bainton

- Sunrisers won the toss and elected to bat.
- Points: Sunrisers 4, Southern Vipers 0

7 July 2023
10:30
Scorecard

| Southern Vipers; 262/8 (50 overs) | v | North West Thunder; 262/8 (50 overs) |
| Emily Windsor 49 (62); Emma Lamb 2/35 (7 overs) | | Eleanor Threlkeld 60 (60); Maitlan Brown 3/52 (10 overs) |

Match Tied
Trafalgar Road Ground, Southport
Umpires: Grace Banbury and Hassan Adnan

- Southern Vipers won the toss and elected to bat.
- Points: North West Thunder 2, Southern Vipers 2

11 July 2023
10:30
Scorecard

| Southern Vipers; 259/7 (50 overs) | v | The Blaze; 260/6 (48.2 overs) |
| Georgia Adams 94* (104); Nadine de Klerk 3/48 (10 overs) | | Marie Kelly 61 (81); Linsey Smith 2/37 (10 overs) |

The Blaze won by 4 wickets
Newclose County Cricket Ground, Newport
Umpires: Julia Jarvis and Rose Dovey

- The Blaze won the toss and elected to field.
- Points: The Blaze 4, Southern Vipers 0

15 July 2023
10:30
Scorecard

| Western Storm; 230/5 (48 overs) | v | Southern Vipers; 240/6 (43.4 overs) |
| Emma Corney 69 (100); Linsey Smith 2/36 (10 overs) | | Maia Bouchier 71 (72); Alex Griffiths 2/35 (5.4 overs) |

Southern Vipers won by 4 wickets (DLS method)
Millfield School, Street
Umpires: Ben Peverall and Sophie McLelland

- Southern Vipers won the toss and elected to field.
- Match reduced to 48 overs per side due to rain; Southern Vipers target was 238.
- Points: Southern Vipers 4, Western Storm 0

22 July 2023
10:30
Scorecard

| Northern Diamonds; 105/4 (25.4 overs) | v | Southern Vipers |
| Hollie Armitage 48 (64); Georgia Adams 2/23 (4.4 overs) |

No result
Arundel Castle Cricket Ground, Arundel
Umpires: Anthony Harris and Ben Peverall

- Southern Vipers won the toss and elected to field.
- No further play was possible due to rain.
- Points: Southern Vipers 2, Northern Diamonds 2

5 September 2023
10:30
Scorecard

| Southern Vipers; 261/8 (50 overs) | v | Northern Diamonds; 258/5 (50 overs) |
| Georgia Adams 82 (98); Grace Hall 4/46 (10 overs) | | Hollie Armitage 106* (107); Nancy Harman 1/31 (5 overs) |

Southern Vipers won by 3 runs
South Northumberland Cricket Club, Gosforth
Umpires: Amy Clark and James Middlebrook

- Southern Vipers won the toss and elected to bat.
- Points: Southern Vipers 4, Northern Diamonds 0

9 September 2023
10:30
Scorecard

| Southern Vipers; 237 (47.5 overs) | v | North West Thunder; 173 (44.3 overs) |
| Georgia Adams 71 (70); Olivia Bell 3/45 (8.5 overs) | | Fi Morris 52 (55); Mary Taylor 4/39 (8.3 overs) |

Southern Vipers won by 64 runs
Arundel Castle Cricket Ground, Arundel
Umpires: Anthony Harris and Hassan Adnan

- Southern Vipers won the toss and elected to bat.
- Points: Southern Vipers 5, Thunder 0

13 September 2023
10:30
Scorecard

| Southern Vipers; 254 (48.2 overs) | v | South East Stars; 196 (47.2 overs) |
| Linsey Smith 51 (58); Danielle Gregory 4/55 (10 overs) | | Aylish Cranstone 69 (64); Linsey Smith 3/34 (10 overs) |

Southern Vipers won by 58 runs
Rose Bowl, Southampton
Umpires: Ben Peverall and Rose Dovey

- Southern Vipers won the toss and elected to bat.
- Points: Southern Vipers 5, South East Stars 0

16 September 2023
10:30
Scorecard

| Southern Vipers; 288 (49.5 overs) | v | The Blaze; 162 (39.1 overs) |
| Maia Bouchier 64 (68); Grace Ballinger 4/58 (9.5 overs) | | Marie Kelly 56 (62); Mary Taylor 3/15 (7 overs) |

Southern Vipers won by 126 runs
Haslegrave Ground, Loughborough
Umpires: Anthony Harris and Jasmine Naeem

- The Blaze won the toss and elected to field.
- Points: Southern Vipers 5, The Blaze 0

==== Final ====
24 September 2023
10:30
Scorecard

| The Blaze; 200/8 (48 overs) | v | Southern Vipers; 203/5 (40.2 overs) |
| Tammy Beaumont 76 (104); Linsey Smith 3/30 (10 overs) | | Emily Windsor 57* (53); Josie Groves 3/39 (8 overs) |

Southern Vipers won by 5 wickets
County Ground, Northampton
Umpires: Ben Peverall and Rose Dovey

- Southern Vipers won the toss and elected to field.
- Match reduced to 48 overs per side due to rain.

=== Tournament statistics ===
==== Batting ====
| Player | Matches | Innings | Runs | Average | High score | 100s | 50s |
|---|---|---|---|---|---|---|---|
| Georgia Adams | 13 | 12 | 546 | 49.63 | 94* | 0 | 5 |
| Emily Windsor | 12 | 11 | 408 | 45.33 | 84 | 0 | 4 |
| Ella McCaughan | 14 | 13 | 331 | 25.46 | 67 | 0 | 2 |
| Maia Bouchier | 9 | 8 | 322 | 40.25 | 71 | 0 | 4 |
| Georgia Elwiss | 11 | 11 | 273 | 24.81 | 64 | 0 | 3 |
| Freya Kemp | 9 | 8 | 211 | 30.14 | 47 | 0 | 0 |

Source: ESPN Cricinfo Qualification: 200 runs.

==== Bowling ====
| Player | Matches | Overs | Wickets | Average | Economy | BBI | 5wi |
|---|---|---|---|---|---|---|---|
| Georgia Adams | 13 | 110.0 | 20 | 24.15 | 4.39 | 4/30 | 0 |
| Linsey Smith | 12 | 111.0 | 19 | 19.94 | 3.41 | 3/29 | 0 |
| Mary Taylor | 11 | 94.5 | 14 | 35.64 | 5.26 | 4/39 | 0 |
| Charlie Dean | 7 | 60.0 | 10 | 24.80 | 4.13 | 3/18 | 0 |
| Ava Lee | 8 | 72.1 | 10 | 30.10 | 4.17 | 2/33 | 0 |

Source: ESPN Cricinfo Qualification: 10 wickets.

== Charlotte Edwards Cup ==
=== Season standings ===
| Pos | Team | Pld | W | L | T | NR | BP | Pts | NRR |
|---|---|---|---|---|---|---|---|---|---|
| 1 | The Blaze (Q) | 7 | 7 | 0 | 0 | 0 | 4 | 32 | 1.765 |
| 2 | Southern Vipers (Q) | 7 | 5 | 2 | 0 | 0 | 2 | 22 | 0.940 |
| 3 | North West Thunder (Q) | 7 | 4 | 3 | 0 | 0 | 2 | 18 | 0.331 |
| 4 | Northern Diamonds | 7 | 4 | 3 | 0 | 0 | 1 | 17 | −0.129 |
| 5 | South East Stars | 7 | 3 | 4 | 0 | 0 | 0 | 12 | −0.096 |
| 6 | Western Storm | 7 | 3 | 4 | 0 | 0 | 0 | 12 | −0.512 |
| 7 | Central Sparks | 7 | 2 | 5 | 0 | 0 | 0 | 8 | −0.558 |
| 8 | Sunrisers | 7 | 0 | 7 | 0 | 0 | 0 | 0 | −1.717 |

Source: England and Wales Cricket Board

advanced to final advanced to the semi-final

=== Fixtures ===
23 May 2023
11:00 BST
Scorecard

| South East Stars; 169/6 (20 overs) | v | Southern Vipers; 171/4 (18.5 overs) |
| Bryony Smith 83 (47); Lauren Bell 2/25 (4 overs) | | Danni Wyatt 40 (20); Freya Davies 1/18 (2 overs) |

Southern Vipers won by 6 wickets
Falkland Cricket Club, Newbury
Umpires: Ben Peverall and Rose Dovey

- Southern Vipers won the toss and elected to field.
- Points: Southern Vipers 4, South East Stars 0

26 May 2023
15:00 BST
Scorecard

| Western Storm; 105/8 (20 overs) | v | Southern Vipers; 107/3 (14.1 overs) |
| Sophie Luff 44 (46); Lauren Bell 3/19 (4 overs) | | Maia Bouchier 45 (41); Lauren Filer 1/12 (3 overs) |

Southern Vipers won by 7 wickets
Rose Bowl, Southampton
Umpires: Paul Nicholls and Ben Peverall

- Western Storm won the toss and elected to bat.
- Points: Southern Vipers 5, Western Storm 0

29 May 2023
11:00 BST
Scorecard

| Southern Vipers; 118 (19.3 overs) | v | The Blaze; 119/5 (19.4 overs) |
| Georgia Adams 31 (27); Nadine de Klerk 2/10 (3.3 overs) | | Tammy Beaumont 49* (40); Linsey Smith 2/19 (4 overs) |

The Blaze won by 5 wickets
County Ground, Derby
Umpires: Hassan Adnan and Simon Widdup

- The Blaze won the toss and elected to field.
- Points: The Blaze 4, Southern Vipers 0

31 May 2023
15:00 BST
Scorecard

| North West Thunder; 111 (18.5 overs) | v | Southern Vipers; 115/6 (16.1 overs) |
| Deandra Dottin 24 (28); Linsey Smith 2/16 (4 overs) | | Ella McCaughan 42 (37); Olivia Bell 2/29 (3.1 overs) |

Southern Vipers won by 4 wickets
Rose Bowl, Southampton
Umpires: Fiona Richards and James Tredwell

- North West Thunder won the toss and elected to bat.
- Points: Southern Vipers 4, North West Thunder 0

3 June 2023
14:30 BST
Scorecard

| Central Sparks; 142/9 (20 overs) | v | Southern Vipers; 135/8 (20 overs) |
| Amy Jones 45 (34); Charlie Dean 3/27 (4 overs) | | Danni Wyatt 68 (49); Bethan Ellis 4/29 (4 overs) |

Central Sparks won by 7 runs
Edgbaston Cricket Ground, Birmingham
Umpires: Anthony Harris and Grace Bambury

- Central Sparks won the toss and elected to bat.
- Points: Central Sparks 4, Southern Vipers 0

4 June 2023
15:30 BST
Scorecard

| Southern Vipers; 144/6 (20 overs) | v | Northern Diamonds; 128/9 (20 overs) |
| Georgia Adams 42* (42); Katie Levick 2/12 (4 overs) | | Sterre Kalis 32 (36); Anya Shrubsole 4/18 (4 overs) |

Southern Vipers won by 16 runs
Headingley Cricket Ground, Leeds
Umpires: Joanne Ibbotson and Simon Widdup

- Southern Vipers won the toss and elected to bat.
- Points: Southern Vipers 4, Northern Diamonds 0

7 June 2023
19:00 BST (D/N)
Scorecard

| Sunrisers; 114/7 (20 overs) | v | Southern Vipers; 115/5 (14.5 overs) |
| Cordelia Griffith 65 (56); Linsey Smith 3/13 (4 overs) | | Georgia Adams 63* (33); Mady Villiers 3/15 (4 overs) |

Southern Vipers won by 5 wickets
County Ground, Hove
Umpires: Rose Dovey and Surendiran Shanmugam

- Southern Vipers won the toss and elected to field.
- Points: Southern Vipers 5, Sunrisers 0

==== Semi-final ====
10 June 2023
12:00 BST
Scorecard

| Southern Vipers; 191/6 (20 overs) | v | North West Thunder; 173/8 (20 overs) |
| Danni Wyatt 76 (50); Olivia Bell 4/37 (4 overs) | | Fi Morris 36 (25); Georgia Adams 2/26 (3 overs) |

Southern Vipers won by 18 runs
New Road, Worcester
Umpires: Rose Dovey and Sue Redfern
Player of the match: Danni Wyatt (Southern Vipers)

- North West Thunder won the toss and elected to field.

==== Final ====
10 & 11 June 2023
16:00 BST
Scorecard

| The Blaze; 114/8 (20 overs) | v | Southern Vipers; 118/3 (14.2 overs) |
| Marie Kelly 26* (36); Georgia Adams 2/20 (4 overs) | | Danni Wyatt 50 (28); Lucy Higham 1/16 (2 overs) |

Southern Vipers won by 7 wickets
New Road, Worcester
Umpires: Anna Harris and Sue Redfern
Player of the match: Anya Shrubsole (Southern Vipers)

- The Blaze won the toss and elected to bat.
- Rain interrupted The Blaze innings at 53/4 from 9.3 overs on 10 June. Play resumed on the reserve day on 11 June.

=== Tournament statistics ===
==== Batting ====
| Player | Matches | Innings | Runs | Average | High score | 100s | 50s |
|---|---|---|---|---|---|---|---|
| Danni Wyatt | 6 | 6 | 273 | 45.50 | 76 | 0 | 3 |
| Georgia Adams | 9 | 9 | 249 | 49.80 | 63* | 0 | 1 |
| Maia Bouchier | 6 | 6 | 196 | 32.66 | 56 | 0 | 1 |
| Ella McCaughan | 6 | 6 | 105 | 17.50 | 42 | 0 | 0 |

Source: ESPN Cricinfo Qualification: 100 runs.

==== Bowling ====
| Player | Matches | Overs | Wickets | Average | Economy | BBI | 5wi |
|---|---|---|---|---|---|---|---|
| Anya Shrubsole | 8 | 28.5 | 13 | 13.15 | 5.93 | 4/18 | 0 |
| Linsey Smith | 9 | 36.0 | 13 | 14.07 | 5.08 | 3/13 | 0 |
| Georgia Adams | 9 | 32.0 | 10 | 21.60 | 6.75 | 2/20 | 0 |
| Charlie Dean | 5 | 20.0 | 8 | 15.37 | 6.15 | 3/27 | 0 |
| Georgia Elwiss | 9 | 29.0 | 8 | 25.87 | 7.13 | 2/20 | 0 |
| Lauren Bell | 3 | 12.0 | 6 | 13.50 | 6.75 | 3/19 | 0 |

Source: ESPN Cricinfo Qualification: 5 wickets.

== Season statistics ==
=== Batting ===
| Player | Rachael Heyhoe Flint Trophy | | | | | | | | Charlotte Edwards Cup | | | | | | | |
| Player | Matches | Innings | Runs | High score | Average | Strike rate | 100s | 50s | Matches | Innings | Runs | High score | Average | Strike rate | 100s | 50s |
|---|---|---|---|---|---|---|---|---|---|---|---|---|---|---|---|---|
| Georgia Adams | 13 | 12 | 546 | 94* | 49.63 | 82.22 | 0 | 5 | 9 | 9 | 249 | 63* | 49.80 | 125.12 | 0 | 1 |
| Lauren Bell | 4 | 2 | 0 | 0* | 0.00 | 0.00 | 0 | 0 | 3 | – | – | – | – | – | – | – |
| Maia Bouchier | 9 | 8 | 322 | 71 | 40.25 | 88.70 | 0 | 4 | 6 | 6 | 196 | 56 | 32.66 | 139.00 | 0 | 1 |
| Maitlan Brown | 4 | 3 | 38 | 19 | 12.66 | 79.16 | 0 | 0 | – | – | – | – | – | – | – | – |
| Charlie Dean | 7 | 6 | 83 | 42 | 13.83 | 75.45 | 0 | 0 | 5 | 3 | 34 | 20* | 34.00 | 147.82 | 0 | 0 |
| Georgia Elwiss | 11 | 11 | 273 | 64 | 24.81 | 70.00 | 0 | 3 | 9 | 8 | 83 | 28* | 16.60 | 89.24 | 0 | 0 |
| Nicole Faltum | 2 | 2 | 28 | 21 | 14.00 | 57.14 | 0 | 0 | 9 | 8 | 37 | 14 | 5.28 | 78.72 | 0 | 0 |
| Nancy Harman | 2 | 2 | 19 | 18 | 9.50 | 76.00 | 0 | 0 | 4 | 4 | 49 | 32* | 24.50 | 119.51 | 0 | 0 |
| Freya Kemp | 9 | 8 | 211 | 47 | 30.14 | 109.32 | 0 | 0 | 6 | 6 | 48 | 13* | 9.30 | 120.00 | 0 | 0 |
| Ava Lee | 8 | 4 | 9 | 9 | 3.00 | 75.00 | 0 | 0 | – | – | – | – | – | – | – | – |
| Ella McCaughan | 14 | 13 | 331 | 67 | 25.46 | 60.73 | 0 | 2 | 6 | 6 | 105 | 42 | 17.50 | 109.37 | 0 | 0 |
| Alice Monaghan | 11 | 9 | 108 | 34* | 18.00 | 90.75 | 0 | 0 | 6 | 2 | 1 | 1* | 1.00 | 20.00 | 0 | 0 |
| Abi Norgrove | 5 | 5 | 83 | 48 | 16.60 | 47.70 | 0 | 0 | – | – | – | – | – | – | – | – |
| Anya Shrubsole | – | – | – | – | – | – | – | – | 8 | 1 | 0 | 0* | – | 0.00 | 0 | 0 |
| Linsey Smith | 12 | 10 | 178 | 51 | 29.66 | 77.05 | 0 | 1 | 9 | 2 | 6 | 5 | 6.00 | 66.66 | 0 | 0 |
| Rhianna Southby | 14 | 9 | 56 | 21 | 9.33 | 83.58 | 0 | 0 | – | – | – | – | – | – | – | – |
| Megan Sturge | 2 | 1 | 6 | 6 | 6.00 | 85.71 | 0 | 0 | – | – | – | – | – | – | – | – |
| Charlotte Taylor | 1 | – | – | – | – | – | – | – | – | – | – | – | – | – | – | – |
| Mary Taylor | 11 | 8 | 40 | 16 | 10.00 | 74.07 | 0 | 0 | 6 | 2 | 2 | 2 | 1.00 | 28.57 | 0 | 0 |
| Emily Windsor | 12 | 11 | 408 | 84 | 45.33 | 81.60 | 0 | 4 | 7 | 5 | 63 | 25 | 15.75 | 90.00 | 0 | 0 |
| Danni Wyatt | 3 | 3 | 50 | 24 | 16.66 | 83.33 | 0 | 0 | 6 | 6 | 273 | 76 | 45.50 | 150.00 | 0 | 3 |
Source: ESPN Cricinfo

=== Bowling ===
| Player | Rachael Heyhoe Flint Trophy | | | | | | | Charlotte Edwards Cup | | | | | | |
| Player | Matches | Overs | Wickets | Average | Economy | BBI | 5wi | Matches | Overs | Wickets | Average | Economy | BBI | 5wi |
|---|---|---|---|---|---|---|---|---|---|---|---|---|---|---|
| Georgia Adams | 13 | 110.0 | 20 | 24.15 | 4.39 | 4/30 | 0 | 9 | 32.0 | 10 | 21.60 | 6.75 | 2/20 | 0 |
| Lauren Bell | 4 | 27.0 | 5 | 24.80 | 4.59 | 4/37 | 0 | 3 | 12.0 | 6 | 13.50 | 6.75 | 3/19 | 0 |
| Maitlan Brown | 4 | 33.0 | 5 | 33.40 | 5.06 | 3/52 | 0 | – | – | – | – | – | – | – |
| Charlie Dean | 7 | 60.0 | 10 | 24.80 | 4.13 | 3/18 | 0 | 5 | 20.0 | 8 | 15.37 | 6.15 | 3/27 | 0 |
| Georgia Elwiss | 11 | 46.0 | 8 | 22.75 | 3.95 | 3/37 | 0 | 9 | 29.0 | 8 | 25.87 | 7.13 | 2/20 | 0 |
| Nancy Harman | 2 | 9.0 | 2 | 29.00 | 6.44 | 1/27 | 0 | 4 | 3.0 | 0 | – | 8.66 | – | 0 |
| Ava Lee | 8 | 72.1 | 10 | 30.10 | 4.17 | 2/33 | 0 | – | – | – | – | – | – | – |
| Alice Monaghan | 11 | 47.3 | 8 | 33.00 | 5.55 | 2/19 | 0 | 6 | 3.0 | 0 | – | 12.00 | – | 0 |
| Anya Shrubsole | – | – | – | – | – | – | – | 8 | 28.5 | 13 | 13.15 | 5.93 | 4/18 | 0 |
| Linsey Smith | 12 | 111.0 | 19 | 19.94 | 3.41 | 3/29 | 0 | 9 | 36.0 | 13 | 14.07 | 5.08 | 3/13 | 0 |
| Megan Sturge | 2 | 12.0 | 1 | 79.00 | 6.58 | 1/67 | 0 | – | – | – | – | – | – | – |
| Charlotte Taylor | 1 | 5.0 | 0 | – | 4.40 | – | 0 | – | – | – | – | – | – | – |
| Mary Taylor | 11 | 94.5 | 14 | 35.64 | 5.26 | 4/39 | 0 | 6 | 14.4 | 2 | 53.50 | 7.29 | 1/7 | 0 |
| Danni Wyatt | 3 | 1.0 | 0 | – | 15.00 | – | 0 | 6 | – | – | – | – | – | – |
Source: ESPN Cricinfo

=== Fielding ===
| Player | Rachael Heyhoe Flint Trophy | | | Charlotte Edwards Cup | | |
| Player | Matches | Innings | Catches | Matches | Innings | Catches |
|---|---|---|---|---|---|---|
| Georgia Adams | 13 | 13 | 11 | 9 | 9 | 3 |
| Lauren Bell | 4 | 4 | 0 | 3 | 3 | 0 |
| Maia Bouchier | 9 | 9 | 3 | 6 | 6 | 2 |
| Maitlan Brown | 4 | 4 | 2 | – | – | – |
| Charlie Dean | 7 | 7 | 3 | 5 | 5 | 2 |
| Georgia Elwiss | 11 | 11 | 2 | 9 | 9 | 7 |
| Nicole Faltum | 2 | 2 | 0 | 9 | 0 | 0 |
| Nancy Harman | 2 | 2 | 2 | 4 | 4 | 0 |
| Freya Kemp | 9 | 9 | 2 | 6 | 6 | 2 |
| Ava Lee | 8 | 8 | 3 | – | – | – |
| Ella McCaughan | 14 | 14 | 3 | 6 | 6 | 5 |
| Alice Monaghan | 11 | 11 | 5 | 6 | 6 | 1 |
| Abi Norgrove | 5 | 5 | 2 | – | – | – |
| Anya Shrubsole | – | – | – | 8 | 8 | 0 |
| Linsey Smith | 12 | 12 | 5 | 9 | 9 | 3 |
| Megan Sturge | 2 | 2 | 0 | – | – | – |
| Charlotte Taylor | 1 | 1 | 0 | – | – | – |
| Mary Taylor | 11 | 11 | 2 | 6 | 6 | 2 |
| Emily Windsor | 12 | 12 | 1 | 7 | 7 | 0 |
| Danni Wyatt | 3 | 3 | 0 | 6 | 6 | 2 |
Source: ESPN Cricinfo

=== Wicket-keeping ===
| Player | Rachael Heyhoe Flint Trophy | | | | Charlotte Edwards Cup | | | |
| Player | Matches | Innings | Catches | Stumpings | Matches | Innings | Catches | Stumpings |
|---|---|---|---|---|---|---|---|---|
| Nicole Faltum | 2 | – | – | – | 9 | 9 | 6 | 4 |
| Rhianna Southby | 14 | 14 | 10 | 5 | – | – | – | – |
Source: ESPN Cricinfo
