= 2024 Southern Vipers season =

English cricket season

Southern Vipers
2024 season
- Coach: Charlotte Edwards
- Captain: Georgia Adams
- Overseas player: (Australia) Charli Knott
- RHFT: Semi-finals
- CEC: Semi-finals
- Most runs: RHFT: Georgia Elwiss (488); CEC: Georgia Elwiss (242)
- Most wickets: RHFT: Georgia Adams (21); CEC: Charli Knott (16)
- Most catches: RHFT: Linsey Smith (6); CEC: Georgia Adams (8)
- Most wicket-keeping dismissals: RHFT: Rhianna Southby (9); CEC: Rhianna Southby (14)

The 2024 season saw Southern Vipers compete in the 50 over Rachael Heyhoe Flint Trophy and the Twenty20 Charlotte Edwards Cup. The side reached the semi-final stage in both competitions: in the Charlotte Edwards Cup, the side finished third in the group, winning six of their ten matches, before losing to South East Stars in the semi-final, whilst in the Rachael Heyhoe Flint Trophy the side again finished third in the group, winning seven of their fourteen matches, before again losing to South East Stars in the semi-final.

The side was captained by Georgia Adams and coached by Charlotte Edwards. They played five home matches at the Rose Bowl, two apiece at the County Ground, Hove, Arundel Castle Cricket Ground and Sir Paul Getty's Ground and one at Falkland Cricket Club.

This was Southern Vipers' final season in existence, effectively being replaced by a professionalised Hampshire team under the England and Wales Cricket Board's changes to the structure of women's domestic cricket from 2025 onwards.

== Squad ==
=== Departures ===
On 18 October 2023, it was announced that Chloe Hill had left the side to join South East Stars on a permanent basis, having been on loan to Stars for parts of the 2023 season.

=== Arrivals ===
On 6 December 2023, it was announced that Freya Davies had joined the side from South East Stars. On 19 February 2024, it was announced that the side had signed Charli Knott as an overseas player from April to July 2024. On 17 May 2024, Poppy Tulloch was named in a matchday squad for the first time. On 9 July 2024, Rachel King was named in a matchday squad for the first time. On 29 August 2024, it was announced that Rebecca Tyson had signed on a Pay As You Play contract for the remainder of the season. On 3 September 2024, it was announced that the side had loaned in Naomi Dattani from North West Thunder for the remainder of the season.

=== Personnel and contract changes ===
On 1 November 2023, it was announced that Mary Taylor had signed her first professional contract with the side.

=== Squad list ===
- Age given is at the start of Southern Vipers' first match of the season (20 April 2024).

Name	Nationality	Birth date	Batting Style	Bowling Style	Notes
Batters
Maia Bouchier	England	5 December 1998 (aged 25)	Right-handed	Right-arm medium	
Ella McCaughan	England	26 September 2002 (aged 21)	Right-handed	Right-arm leg break	
Abi Norgrove	England	17 January 2006 (aged 18)	Right-handed	Right-arm off break	
Emily Windsor	England	14 June 1997 (aged 26)	Right-handed	Right-arm medium	
All-rounders
Georgia Adams	England	4 October 1993 (aged 30)	Right-handed	Right-arm off break	Captain
Naomi Dattani	England	28 April 1994 (aged 29)	Left-handed	Left-arm medium	On loan from North West Thunder, September 2024
Charlie Dean	England	22 December 2000 (aged 23)	Right-handed	Right-arm off break	
Georgia Elwiss	England	31 May 1991 (aged 32)	Right-handed	Right-arm medium	
Freya Kemp	England	21 April 2005 (aged 18)	Left-handed	Left-arm medium	
Charli Knott	England	29 November 2002 (aged 21)	Right-handed	Right-arm off break	Overseas player; April to July 2024
Sophie Mitchelmore	England	21 January 2001 (aged 23)	Right-handed	Right-arm medium	
Alice Monaghan	England	20 March 2000 (aged 24)	Right-handed	Right-arm medium	
Mary Taylor	England	7 October 2004 (aged 19)	Right-handed	Right-arm medium	
Danni Wyatt	England	22 April 1991 (aged 32)	Right-handed	Right-arm off break	
Wicket-keepers
Rachel King	England	1 October 2004 (aged 19)	Right-handed	—	Joined July 2024
Rhianna Southby	England	16 October 2000 (aged 23)	Right-handed	—	
Megan Sturge	England	3 November 2004 (aged 19)	Right-handed	Right-arm off break	
Bowlers
Lauren Bell	England	2 January 2001 (aged 23)	Right-handed	Right-arm fast-medium	
Freya Davies	England	27 October 1995 (aged 28)	Right-handed	Right-arm fast-medium	
Nancy Harman	England	11 July 1999 (aged 24)	Right-handed	Right-arm leg break	
Ava Lee	England	26 August 2005 (aged 18)	Right-handed	Right-arm off break	
Linsey Smith	England	10 March 1995 (aged 29)	Left-handed	Slow left-arm orthodox	
Charlotte Taylor	England	2 February 1994 (aged 30)	Right-handed	Right-arm off break	
Finty Trussler	England	8 May 2003 (aged 20)	Right-handed	Right-arm leg break	
Poppy Tulloch	England	12 April 2006 (aged 18)	Right-handed	Right-arm medium	Joined May 2024
Rebecca Tyson	England	26 June 2000 (aged 23)	Left-handed	Slow left-arm orthodox	Joined August 2024

== Rachael Heyhoe Flint Trophy ==
=== Season standings ===
Pos	Team	Pld	W	L	T	NR	BP	Pts	NRR
1	Northern Diamonds (Q)	14	9	4	0	1	3	41	0.097
2	South East Stars (Q)	14	9	5	0	0	4	40	0.246
3	Southern Vipers (Q)	14	7	6	0	1	4	34	0.534
4	Sunrisers (Q)	14	7	6	0	1	4	34	−0.122
5	The Blaze	14	7	6	0	1	1	31	−0.176
6	North West Thunder	14	5	8	0	1	3	25	−0.013
7	Central Sparks	14	5	8	0	1	3	25	−0.299
8	Western Storm	14	4	10	0	0	2	18	−0.211

Source: ESPNCricinfo

advanced to the Semi-finals

=== Fixtures ===
20 April 2024
10:30
Scorecard

Southern Vipers; 273/9 (50 overs)	v	South East Stars; 274/6 (49.3 overs)
Freya Kemp 50 (47); Ryana MacDonald-Gay 3/46 (9 overs)		Tash Farrant 94 (97); Charli Knott 2/35 (10 overs)

South East Stars won by 4 wickets
County Ground, Beckenham
Umpires: James Tredwell and Sophie McLelland

- South East Stars won the toss and elected to bowl.
- Points: South East Stars 4, Southern Vipers 0

24 April 2024
10:30
Scorecard

Central Sparks; 172/9 (50 overs)	v	Southern Vipers; 173/3 (38.5 overs)
Katie George 52 (99); Linsey Smith 2/20 (10 overs)		Charli Knott 58*; Ria Fackrell 1/15 (4.5 overs)

Southern Vipers won by 7 wickets
Sir Paul Getty's Ground, Wormsley
Umpires: Ian Blackwell and Rose Dovey

- Southern Vipers won the toss and elected to bowl.
- Points: Southern Vipers 5, Central Sparks 0

27 April 2024
10:30
Scorecard

Southern Vipers; 287/9 (50 overs)	v	Northern Diamonds; 162/7 (30 overs)
Ella McCaughan 83 (97); Phoebe Turner 3/48 (10 overs)		Lauren Winfield-Hill 63 (62); Charlie Dean 4/34 (8 overs)

Southern Vipers won by 70 runs (DLS)
Rose Bowl, Southampton
Umpires: Ben Peverall and Rose Dovey

- Northern Diamonds won the toss and elected to bowl.
- Northern Diamonds innings curtailed at 30 overs due to rain; target was 233.
- Points: Southern Vipers 5, Northern Diamonds 0

1 May 2024
10:30
Scorecard

North West Thunder; 206/9 (50 overs)	v	Southern Vipers; 208/7 (43.3 overs)
Seren Smale 99 (145); Linsey Smith 3/19 (10 overs)		Georgia Adams 51 (65); Tara Norris 3/45 (10 overs)

Southern Vipers won by 3 wickets
Sir Paul Getty's Ground, Wormsley
Umpires: Ben Peverall and Julia Jarvis

- Southern Vipers won the toss and elected to bowl.
- Points: Southern Vipers 4, North West Thunder 0

4 May 2024
10:30
Scorecard

Southern Vipers; 295/5 (50 overs)	v	Western Storm; 291/9 (50 overs)
Charli Knott 102 (112); Sophia Smale 2/49 (9 overs)		Heather Knight 62 (59); Freya Davies 2/51 (10 overs)

Southern Vipers won by 4 runs
County Ground, Bristol
Umpires: Fiona Richards and Sue Redfern

- Western Storm won the toss and elected to bowl.
- Points: Southern Vipers 4, Western Storm 0

8 May 2024
10:30
Scorecard

Southern Vipers; 211/9 (50 overs)	v	Sunrisers; 212/7 (49.3 overs)
Georgia Elwiss 53 (63); Nicola Hancock 3/45 (10 overs)		Jodi Grewcock 56 (56); Charli Knott 3/35 (10 overs)

Sunrisers won by 3 wickets
Brunton Memorial Ground, Radlett
Umpires: Gabi Brown and Jack Shantry

- Sunrisers won the toss and elected to bowl.
- Points: Sunrisers 4, Southern Vipers 0

30 June 2024
10:30
Scorecard

Western Storm; 156 (37 overs)	v	Southern Vipers; 157/3 (29.4 overs)
Fran Wilson 34 (41); Georgia Adams 3/17 (6 overs)		Georgia Elwiss 65* (71); Amanda-Jade Wellington 2/38 (7 overs)

Southern Vipers won by 7 wickets
County Ground, Hove
Umpires: James Tredwell and Rose Dovey

- Southern Vipers won the toss and elected to bowl.
- Points: Southern Vipers 5, Western Storm 0

5 July 2024
10:30
Scorecard

The Blaze; 278 (47.2 overs)	v	Southern Vipers; 281/6 (49.2 overs)
Heather Graham 78 (59); Mary Taylor 3/32 (6.2 overs)		Georgia Elwiss 101* (110); Kathryn Bryce 2/43 (9.2 overs)

Southern Vipers won by 4 wickets
Queen's Park, Chesterfield
Umpires: Amy Clark and Paul Pollard

- The Blaze won the toss and elected to bat.
- Points: Southern Vipers 4, The Blaze 0

10 July 2024
10:30
Scorecard

South East Stars; 120 (40.3 overs)	v	Southern Vipers; 121/3 (22.5 overs)
Alice Davidson-Richards 35 (58); Freya Davies 4/14 (8.3 overs)		Charli Knott 57* (69); Bryony Smith 2/26 (5.1 overs)

Southern Vipers won by 7 wickets
Falkland Cricket Club, Newbury
Umpires: Gabi Brown and James Tredwell

- Southern Vipers won the toss and elected to bowl.
- Points: Southern Vipers 5, South East Stars 0

14 July 2024
10:30
Scorecard

North West Thunder	v	Southern Vipers

Match Abandoned
Sedbergh School, Sedbergh

- No toss.
- No play possible due to rain.
- Points: North West Thunder 2, Southern Vipers 2

26 August 2024
10:30
Scorecard

The Blaze; 208 (49.5 overs)	v	Southern Vipers; 188 (44 overs)
Marie Kelly 40 (37); Ava Lee 4/51 (10 overs)		Emily Windsor 41 (64); Orla Prendergast 3/38 (7 overs)

The Blaze won by 20 runs
Arundel Castle Cricket Ground, Arundel
Umpires: Anthony Harris and Rose Dovey

- Southern Vipers won the toss and elected to bowl.
- Points: The Blaze 4, Southern Vipers 0

30 August 2024
10:30
Scorecard

Southern Vipers; 183 (48.4 overs)	v	Central Sparks; 184/3 (39.2 overs)
Georgia Elwiss 64* (86); Emily Arlott 4/15 (10 overs)		Evelyn Jones 54 (78); Georgia Adams 2/34 (9.2 overs)

Central Sparks won by 7 wickets
New Road, Worcester
Umpires: Ben Peverall and Grace Bambury

- Central Sparks won the toss and elected to bowl.
- Points: Central Sparks 5, Southern Vipers 0

4 September 2024
10:30
Scorecard

Southern Vipers; 240/8 (50 overs)	v	Northern Diamonds; 241/9 (50 overs)
Georgia Adams 57 (82); Katie Levick 3/36 (10 overs)		Emma Marlow 52 (84); Georgia Adams 4/30 (10 overs)

Northern Diamonds won by 1 wicket
Headingley Cricket Ground, Leeds
Umpires: Jasmine Naeem and Sue Redfern

- Southern Vipers won the toss and elected to bat.
- Points: Northern Diamonds 4, Southern Vipers 0

7 September 2024
10:30
Scorecard

Sunrisers; 281 (50 overs)	v	Southern Vipers; 88/8 (10 overs)
Cordelia Griffith 55 (68); Naomi Dattani 5/51 (8 overs)		Ella McCaughan 15 (10); Eva Gray 2/22 (2 overs)

Sunrisers won by 5 runs (DLS)
Rose Bowl, Southampton
Umpires: Gabi Brown and Ian Blackwell

- Southern Vipers won the toss and elected to bowl.
- Southern Vipers innings reduced to 10 overs due to rain; target was 94.
- Points: Sunrisers 4, Southern Vipers 0

==== Semi-final ====
14 September 2024
10:30
Scorecard

Southern Vipers; 219/9 (50 overs)	v	South East Stars; 221/7 (48.5 overs)
Nancy Harman 42 (59); Matilda Corteen-Coleman 3/33 (10 overs)		Alice Davidson-Richards 90* (109); Georgia Elwiss 3/39 (10 overs)

South East Stars won by 3 wickets
County Ground, Beckenham
Umpires: Neil Bainton and Sue Redfern

- Southern Vipers won the toss and elected to bat.

=== Tournament statistics ===
==== Batting ====
Player	Matches	Innings	Runs	Average	High score	100s	50s
Georgia Elwiss	12	12	488	69.71	101*	1	3
Georgia Adams	13	12	362	30.16	65	0	3
Charli Knott	9	9	346	49.42	102	1	2
Ella McCaughan	13	13	340	26.15	83	0	1
Abi Norgrove	10	8	205	25.62	64	0	1

Source: ESPN Cricinfo Qualification: 200 runs.

==== Bowling ====
Player	Matches	Overs	Wickets	Average	Economy	BBI	5wi
Georgia Adams	13	106.1	21	20.23	4.00	4/30	0
Charli Knott	9	74.0	16	21.87	4.72	3/35	0
Freya Davies	12	104.0	13	36.69	4.58	4/14	0
Ava Lee	7	55.0	10	27.50	5.00	4/51	0

Source: ESPN Cricinfo Qualification: 10 wickets.

== Charlotte Edwards Cup ==
=== Season standings ===
Pos	Team	Pld	W	L	T	NR	BP	Pts	NRR
1	The Blaze (Q)	10	9	1	0	0	3	39	0.606
2	South East Stars (Q)	10	7	2	0	1	4	34	0.309
3	Southern Vipers (Q)	10	6	4	0	0	2	26	1.001
4	Central Sparks (Q)	10	6	4	0	0	2	26	0.402
5	North West Thunder	10	3	6	0	1	1	15	−0.727
6	Northern Diamonds	10	3	7	0	0	1	13	−0.067
7	Western Storm	10	2	6	0	2	1	13	−0.659
8	Sunrisers	10	2	8	0	0	0	8	−1.073

Source: ESPNCricinfo

advanced to the Semi-finals

=== Fixtures ===
18 May 2024
14:30
Scorecard

The Blaze; 112/9 (20 overs)	v	Southern Vipers; 109/9 (20 overs)
Lucy Higham 36* (26); Mary Taylor 2/12 (4 overs)		Ella McCaughan 19 (31); Kirstie Gordon 2/13 (4 overs)

The Blaze won by 3 runs
Rose Bowl, Southampton
Umpires: James Tredwell and Sophie McLelland

- Southern Vipers won the toss and elected to bowl.
- Points: The Blaze 4, Southern Vipers 0

24 May 2024
18:30
Scorecard

Southern Vipers; 171/2 (20 overs)	v	Sunrisers; 152/5 (20 overs)
Georgia Elwiss 73* (57); Mady Villiers 1/20 (4 overs)		Jo Gardner 79* (61); Mary Taylor 2/29 (4 overs)

Southern Vipers won by 19 runs
County Ground, Chelmsford
Umpires: Gabi Brown and Simon Widdup

- Sunrisers won the toss and elected to bowl.
- Points: Southern Vipers 4, Sunrisers 0

27 May 2024
14:30
Scorecard

Sunrisers; 134/5 (20 overs)	v	Southern Vipers; 131/6 (20 overs)
Jo Gardner 42 (39); Freya Davies 3/22 (4 overs)		Charli Knott 50 (41); Sophie Munro 4/27 (4 overs)

Sunrisers won by 3 runs
Arundel Castle Cricket Ground, Arundel
Umpires: Ben Peverall and Rose Dovey

- Southern Vipers won the toss and elected to bowl.
- Points: Sunrisers 4, Southern Vipers 0

30 May 2024
15:00
Scorecard

Southern Vipers; 173/5 (20 overs)	v	Western Storm; 145/7 (20 overs)
Georgia Adams 48 (34); Amanda-Jade Wellington 3/20 (4 overs)		Sophie Luff 34* (31); Charli Knott 4/23 (4 overs)

Southern Vipers won by 28 runs
Rose Bowl, Southampton
Umpires: Ben Peverall and Rose Dovey

- Western Storm won the toss and elected to bowl.
- Points: Southern Vipers 4, Western Storm 0

2 June 2024
13:30
Scorecard

Southern Vipers; 142/6 (20 overs)	v	South East Stars; 146/4 (18.1 overs)
Alice Monaghan 44* (33); Danielle Gregory 3/23 (4 overs)		Sophia Dunkley 53 (42); Charli Knott 2/29 (4 overs)

South East Stars won by 6 wickets
The Oval, London
Umpires: James Tredwell and Rose Dovey

- South East Stars won the toss and elected to bowl.
- Points: South East Stars 4, Southern Vipers 0

7 June 2024
14:30
Scorecard

North West Thunder; 85 (19.5 overs)	v	Southern Vipers; 86/3 (10.5 overs)
Tara Norris 13* (21); Linsey Smith 3/9 (4 overs)		Charli Knott 45 (28); Sophie Ecclestone 2/23 (4 overs)

Southern Vipers won by 7 wickets
Old Trafford Cricket Ground, Manchester
Umpires: Amy Clark and Hassan Adnan

- Southern Vipers won the toss and elected to bowl.
- Points: Southern Vipers 5, North West Thunder 0

9 June 2024
10:30
Scorecard

Southern Vipers; 137/9 (20 overs)	v	Western Storm; 119 (20 overs)
Georgia Adams 55 (40); Lauren Filer 3/8 (4 overs)		Heather Knight 69 (56); Georgia Adams 3/23 (4 overs)

Southern Vipers won by 18 runs
County Ground, Bristol
Umpires: Fiona Richards and Jack Shantry

- Western Storm won the toss and elected to bowl.
- Points: Southern Vipers 4, Western Storm 0

14 June 2024
15:00
Scorecard

Northern Diamonds; 145/4 (20 overs)	v	Southern Vipers; 146/5 (18.5 overs)
Hollie Armitage 69* (60); Lauren Bell 2/31 (4 overs)		Charlie Dean 64* (38); Rachel Slater 2/23 (4 overs)

Southern Vipers won by 5 wickets
Rose Bowl, Southampton
Umpires: Ben Peverall and Rose Dovey

- Northern Diamonds won the toss and elected to bat.
- Points: Southern Vipers 4, Northern Diamonds 0

16 June 2024
10:30
Scorecard

Southern Vipers; 98 (17.5 overs)	v	Central Sparks; 99/5 (14.5 overs)
Rhianna Southby 19 (20); Bethan Ellis 2/11 (3 overs)		Davina Perrin 26 (17); Linsey Smith 2/13 (4 overs)

Central Sparks won by 5 wickets
New Road, Worcester
Umpires: Anthony Harris and Fiona Richards

- Central Sparks won the toss and elected to bowl.
- Points: Central Sparks 5, Southern Vipers 0

19 June 2024
11:30
Scorecard

Southern Vipers; 179/5 (20 overs)	v	South East Stars; 66 (14 overs)
Maia Bouchier 93 (55); Tash Farrant 2/34 (3 overs)		Bryony Smith 22 (9); Charlie Dean 3/5 (3 overs)

Southern Vipers won by 113 runs
County Ground, Hove
Umpires: Fiona Richards and James Tredwell

- South East Stars won the toss and elected to bowl.
- Points: Southern Vipers 5, South East Stars 0

==== Semi-final ====
22 June 2024
14:30 BST
Scorecard

South East Stars; 162/5 (20 overs)	v	Southern Vipers; 157/9 (20 overs)
Sophia Dunkley 49 (34); Linsey Smith 1/20 (4 overs)		Charlie Dean 43 (29); Matilda Corteen-Coleman 2/23 (4 overs)

South East Stars won by 5 runs
County Cricket Ground, Derby
Umpires: Gabi Brown and James Tredwell
Player of the match: Georgia Redmayne (South East Stars)

- Southern Vipers won the toss and elected to bowl.

=== Tournament statistics ===
==== Batting ====
Player	Matches	Innings	Runs	Average	High score	100s	50s
Georgia Elwiss	10	10	242	30.25	73*	0	1
Charli Knott	11	11	217	19.72	50	0	1
Georgia Adams	10	10	213	23.66	55	0	1
Freya Kemp	9	9	155	22.14	55*	0	1

Source: ESPN Cricinfo Qualification: 150 runs.

==== Bowling ====
Player	Matches	Overs	Wickets	Average	Economy	BBI	5wi
Charli Knott	11	37.0	16	14.93	6.45	4/23	0
Linsey Smith	10	39.0	13	14.76	4.92	3/9	0
Freya Davies	10	35.0	12	20.08	6.88	3/22	0

Source: ESPN Cricinfo Qualification: 10 wickets.

== Season statistics ==
=== Batting ===
Player	Rachael Heyhoe Flint Trophy								Charlotte Edwards Cup							
Player	Matches	Innings	Runs	High score	Average	Strike rate	100s	50s	Matches	Innings	Runs	High score	Average	Strike rate	100s	50s
Georgia Adams	13	12	362	65	30.16	74.33	0	3	10	10	213	55	23.66	115.76	0	1
Lauren Bell	–	–	–	–	–	–	–	–	4	2	1	1*	–	166.66	0	0
Maia Bouchier	3	3	93	34	31.00	88.57	0	0	5	5	109	93	21.80	139.74	0	1
Naomi Dattani	3	3	50	34	16.66	86.20	0	0	–	–	–	–	–	–	–	–
Freya Davies	12	8	21	7	5.25	70.00	0	0	10	3	3	1*	1.50	30.00	0	0
Charlie Dean	3	2	32	29	16.00	103.22	0	0	6	6	136	64*	34.00	137.37	0	1
Georgia Elwiss	12	12	488	101*	69.71	81.60	1	3	10	10	242	73*	30.25	106.14	0	1
Nancy Harman	6	6	115	38	23.00	76.66	0	0	7	5	44	14	11.00	84.61	0	0
Freya Kemp	5	5	128	50	64.00	109.40	0	1	9	9	155	55*	22.14	131.35	0	1
Charli Knott	9	9	346	102	49.42	79.54	1	2	11	11	217	50	19.72	111.85	0	1
Ava Lee	7	5	28	14*	14.00	58.33	0	0	1	1	5	5*	–	166.66	0	0
Ella McCaughan	13	13	340	83	26.15	65.00	0	1	3	3	29	19	9.66	67.44	0	0
Alice Monaghan	7	6	69	27*	17.25	79.31	0	0	7	5	59	44*	19.66	118.00	0	0
Abi Norgrove	10	8	205	64	25.62	62.12	0	1	–	–	–	–	–	–	–	–
Linsey Smith	8	4	13	10	3.25	46.42	0	0	10	3	18	10*	18.00	75.00	0	0
Rhianna Southby	13	10	166	36	18.44	71.24	0	0	11	6	58	25*	14.50	96.66	0	0
Megan Sturge	1	–	–	–	–	–	–	–	–	–	–	–	–	–	–	–
Mary Taylor	12	6	26	10*	13.00	92.85	0	0	6	1	13	13	13.00	92.85	0	0
Rebecca Tyson	3	–	–	–	–	–	–	–	–	–	–	–	–	–	–	–
Emily Windsor	13	11	160	41	14.54	67.22	0	0	7	5	36	17	12.00	105.88	0	0
Danni Wyatt	1	1	11	11	11.00	110.00	0	0	4	4	70	34	17.50	116.66	0	0
Source: ESPN Cricinfo

=== Bowling ===
Player	Rachael Heyhoe Flint Trophy							Charlotte Edwards Cup						
Player	Matches	Overs	Wickets	Average	Economy	BBI	5wi	Matches	Overs	Wickets	Average	Economy	BBI	5wi
Georgia Adams	13	106.1	21	20.23	4.00	4/30	0	10	33.0	8	29.87	7.24	3/23	0
Lauren Bell	–	–	–	–	–	–	–	4	13.0	4	26.75	8.23	2/31	0
Naomi Dattani	3	24.0	6	24.50	6.12	5/51	1	–	–	–	–	–	–	–
Freya Davies	12	104.0	13	36.69	4.58	4/14	0	10	35.0	12	20.08	6.88	3/22	0
Charlie Dean	3	28.0	6	16.66	3.57	4/34	0	6	21.5	9	15.00	6.18	3/5	0
Georgia Elwiss	12	36.0	5	28.60	3.97	3/39	0	10	–	–	–	–	–	–
Nancy Harman	6	10.0	0	–	5.80	–	0	7	5.0	1	37.00	7.40	1/20	0
Freya Kemp	5	5.0	1	12.00	2.40	1/12	0	9	–	–	–	–	–	–
Charli Knott	9	74.0	16	21.87	4.72	3/35	0	11	37.0	16	14.93	6.45	4/23	0
Ava Lee	7	55.0	10	27.50	5.00	4/51	0	1	2.0	1	9.00	4.50	1/9	0
Alice Monaghan	7	14.2	1	74.00	5.16	1/33	0	7	3.0	2	9.00	6.00	2/18	0
Linsey Smith	8	78.0	9	35.33	4.07	3/19	0	10	39.0	13	14.76	4.92	3/9	0
Mary Taylor	12	78.2	9	45.33	5.20	3/32	0	6	18.0	4	29.75	6.61	2/12	0
Rebecca Tyson	3	29.0	4	32.50	4.48	3/49	0	–	–	–	–	–	–	–
Source: ESPN Cricinfo

=== Fielding ===
Player	Rachael Heyhoe Flint Trophy			Charlotte Edwards Cup		
Player	Matches	Innings	Catches	Matches	Innings	Catches
Georgia Adams	13	13	2	10	10	8
Lauren Bell	–	–	–	4	4	0
Maia Bouchier	3	3	3	5	5	3
Naomi Dattani	3	3	1	–	–	–
Freya Davies	12	12	3	10	10	0
Charlie Dean	3	3	1	6	6	1
Georgia Elwiss	12	12	3	10	10	1
Nancy Harman	6	6	0	7	7	1
Freya Kemp	5	5	3	9	9	3
Charli Knott	9	9	4	11	11	5
Ava Lee	7	7	2	1	1	0
Ella McCaughan	13	13	3	3	3	0
Alice Monaghan	7	7	3	7	7	2
Abi Norgrove	10	10	2	–	–	–
Linsey Smith	8	8	6	10	10	2
Mary Taylor	12	12	3	6	6	1
Rebecca Tyson	3	3	2	–	–	–
Emily Windsor	13	13	2	7	7	1
Danni Wyatt	1	1	1	4	4	0
Source: ESPN Cricinfo

=== Wicket-keeping ===
Player	Rachael Heyhoe Flint Trophy				Charlotte Edwards Cup			
Player	Matches	Innings	Catches	Stumpings	Matches	Innings	Catches	Stumpings
Rhianna Southby	13	13	7	2	11	11	5	9
Megan Sturge	1	1	4	0	–	–	–	–
Source: ESPN Cricinfo
