= List of Southern Vipers cricketers =

This is an alphabetical list of cricketers who played for Southern Vipers during their existence between 2016 and 2024. They first played in the Women's Cricket Super League, a Twenty20 competition, that ran from 2016 to 2019. After a restructure of English women's domestic cricket in 2020, they competed in the 50 over Rachael Heyhoe Flint Trophy and, from 2021, the Twenty20 Charlotte Edwards Cup. At the end of the 2024 season, Southern Vipers were effectively replaced by a professionalised Hampshire team.

Players' names are followed by the years in which they were active as a Southern Vipers player. Seasons given are first and last seasons; the player did not necessarily play in all the intervening seasons. This list only includes players who appeared in at least one match for Southern Vipers; players who were named in the team's squad for a season but did not play a match are not included.

== A ==
- Georgia Adams (2016–2024)

== B ==
- Suzie Bates (2016–2019)
- Tammy Beaumont (2018–2019)
- Lauren Bell (2018–2024)
- Maia Bouchier (2018–2024)
- Arran Brindle (2016–2018)
- Thea Brookes (2019)
- Maitlan Brown (2023)

== C ==
- Ella Chandler (2020–2021)
- Isabelle Collis (2016)
- Providence Cowdrill (2020)
- Charlie Dean (2017–2024)

== D ==
- Naomi Dattani (2024)
- Freya Davies (2024)
- Mignon du Preez (2017–2018)

== E ==
- Charlotte Edwards (2016–2017)
- Georgia Elwiss (2021–2024)

== F ==
- Nicole Faltum (2023)
- Tash Farrant (2016–2019)

== G ==
- Katie George (2016–2018)
- Chiara Green (2021)
- Lydia Greenway (2016)

== H ==
- Nancy Harman (2022–2024)
- Chloe Hill (2022)

== K ==
- Marie Kelly (2019)
- Freya Kemp (2022–2024)
- Amelia Kerr (2018)
- Charli Knott (2024)

== L ==
- Ava Lee (2023–2024)
- Gaby Lewis (2021)

== M ==
- Ella McCaughan (2020–2024)
- Sara McGlashan (2016–2018)
- Alice Macleod (2016)
- Hayley Matthews (2017)
- Sophie Mitchelmore (2021)
- Alice Monaghan (2020–2024)
- Fi Morris (2016–2019)

== N ==
- Morna Nielsen (2016)
- Abi Norgrove (2023–2024)
- Tara Norris (2017–2022)

== R ==
- Carla Rudd (2016–2022)

== S ==
- Paige Scholfield (2018–2022)
- Anya Shrubsole (2022–2023)
- Linsey Smith (2016–2024)
- Rhianna Southby (2023–2024)
- Megan Sturge (2023–2024)

== T ==
- Charlotte Taylor (2020–2023)
- Mary Taylor (2022–2024)
- Stafanie Taylor (2019)
- Finty Trussler (2022)
- Rebecca Tyson (2024)

== W ==
- Amanda-Jade Wellington (2019)
- Emily Windsor (2020–2024)
- Issy Wong (2019)
- Danni Wyatt (2017–2024)

== Captains ==
No.	Name	Nationality	Years	First	Last	LA	T20	Total
1	Charlotte Edwards	England	2016–2017	31 July 2016	1 September 2017	0	11	11
2	Suzie Bates	New Zealand	2016–2018	5 August 2016	18 August 2018	0	11	11
3	Tammy Beaumont	England	2019	6 August 2019	1 September 2019	0	11	11
4	Georgia Adams	England	2020–2024	29 August 2020	7 September 2024	49	33	82
5	Emily Windsor	England	2023–2024	2 July 2023	14 September 2024	2	1	3
