= 2025 Women's One-Day Cup =

Women's List A cricket tournament in England

- Dates: 19 April – 21 September 2025
- Administrator: England and Wales Cricket Board
- Cricket format: List A
- Tournament format(s): League 1: Double round-robin and knockout League 2: Round-robin and knockout
- Host(s): England; Wales
- Champions: League 1: Lancashire (1st title); League 2: Yorkshire (1st title)
- Participants: League 1: 8 League 2: 10
- Matches: League 1: 59; League 2: 48
- Most runs: League 1: Emma Lamb (794); League 2: Ami Campbell (439)
- Most wickets: League 1: Georgia Davis (23); League 2: Gemma Porter (18)
- Official website: ecb.co.uk

The 2025 Women's One-Day Cup (also known as the 2025 Metro Bank Women's One-Day Cup for sponsorship reasons) was the inaugural season of the Women's One-Day Cup, a professional List A cricket tournament that is played in England and Wales by county clubs. The tournament started on 19 April and concluded with the final on 21 September 2025.

In the League 2 final, Yorkshire defeated Glamorgan by 9 wickets to win the inaugural title. In the League 1 final, Lancashire defeated Hampshire by 6 wickets to win the inaugural title.

== Format ==
The tournament was split into two categories: one contested by the eight counties in League One and the second featuring the 10 remaining teams split into two groups in League Two.

== Teams and background ==
Eight teams from League 1 competed in the inaugural season: Durham, Essex, Hampshire, Lancashire, Somerset, Surrey, The Blaze (Nottinghamshire) and Warwickshire. Yorkshire and Glamorgan will be awarded tier-one status and will join the league in the 2026 and 2027 seasons, respectively, while a further two clubs will be awarded tier-one status in 2029.

The remaining ten teams competed in League 2, in which each county played eight group-stage matches (home-and-away) against the other four counties in their group. The top two teams from each group progressed to the knockout stage. The teams were divided into the following groups:

North Group	South Group
Derbyshire; Leicestershire; Northamptonshire; Worcestershire; Yorkshire	Glamorgan; Gloucestershire; Kent; Middlesex; Sussex

== Points table ==
=== League One table ===
Pos	Team	Pld	W	L	T	NR	BP	Pts	NRR	Qualification
1	Hampshire	14	9	2	1	2	3	45	0.530	Advance to knockout stage
2	The Blaze	14	9	3	1	1	5	45	0.464	Advance to knockout stage
3	Lancashire	14	9	4	0	1	3	41	0.422	Advance to knockout stage
4	Surrey	14	6	5	1	2	4	34	0.523	Advance to knockout stage
5	Somerset	14	6	6	0	2	3	31	−0.084	
6	Durham	14	5	8	0	1	4	26	−0.164	
7	Warwickshire	14	2	10	1	1	1	13	−0.628	
8	Essex	14	2	10	0	2	0	12	−1.121	

Source: ESPNcricinfoBBC Sports

=== League Two table ===
Pos	Team	Pld	W	L	NR	BP	Pts	NRR	Qualification
1	Middlesex	9	9	0	0	7	43	2.581	Advance to knockout stage
2	Glamorgan	9	7	1	1	5	35	1.926	Advance to knockout stage
3	Northamptonshire Steelbacks	9	7	1	1	5	35	1.259	Advance to knockout stage
4	Yorkshire	9	5	4	0	5	25	1.959	Advance to knockout stage
5	Gloucestershire	9	5	4	0	2	22	−0.851	
6	Worcestershire Rapids	9	4	5	0	4	20	0.256	
7	Sussex Sharks	9	4	5	0	2	18	−0.992	
8	Leicestershire Foxes	9	2	7	0	2	10	−0.991	
9	Kent	9	1	8	0	1	5	−2.135	
10	Derbyshire Falcons	9	0	9	0	0	0	−3.032	

Source: Sky SportsBBC sports

== League One ==
=== Round 1 ===
Match 1
23 April 2025
10:30
Scorecard

Essex; 177 (47.3 overs)	v	Durham; 178/1 (32.4 overs)
Sophia Smale 40 (68); Phoebe Turner 4/33 (8 overs)		Suzie Bates 93* (103); Kate Coppack 1/44 (8 overs)

Durham won by 9 wickets
Riverside Ground, Chester-le-Street
Umpires: Amy Clark and Simon Widdup

- Durham won the toss and elected to field.
- Points: Durham 5, Essex 0

Match 2
23 April 2025
10:30
Scorecard

Surrey; 233/7 (33 overs)	v	Somerset; 241/3 (33 overs)
Alice Davidson-Richards 57* (47); Amanda-Jade Wellington 3/42 (7 overs)		Heather Knight 64 (54); Alice Capsey 1/39 (7 overs)

Somerset won by 7 wickets (DLS method)
County Ground, Beckenham
Umpires: Julia Jarvis and Nigel Llong

- Somerset won the toss and elected to field.
- The match was reduced to 33 overs per side due to rain.
- Somerset were set a revised target of 238 runs from 33 overs due to rain and wet out field.
- Points: Somerset 4, Surrey 0

Match 3
23 April 2025
10:30
Scorecard

The Blaze; 234 (50 overs)	v	Lancashire; 235/2 (45 overs)
Kathryn Bryce 70 (90); Hannah Jones 3/38 (10 overs)		Emma Lamb 130* (140); Kathryn Bryce 1/48 (9 overs)

Lancashire won by 8 wickets
Trent Bridge, Nottingham
Umpires: Naeem Ashraf and Rose Fernando

- The Blaze won the toss and elected to bat.
- Points: Lancashire 4, The Blaze 0

Match 4
23 April 2025
10:30
Scorecard

Hampshire; 208 (48.3 overs)	v	Warwickshire; 208 (50 overs)
Rhianna Southby 72 (95); Chloe Brewer 3/40 (6.3 overs)		Abigail Freeborn 70 (96); Linsey Smith 4/39 (10 overs)

Match tied
Edgbaston, Birmingham
Umpires: Gabi Brown and Jack Shantry

- Hampshire won the toss and elected to bat.
- Points: Hampshire 2, Warwickshire 2

=== Round 2 ===
Match 5
27 April 2025
10:30
Scorecard

Durham; 200 (47.2 overs)	v	The Blaze; 201/5 (37.2 overs)
Hollie Armitage 81 (90); Sarah Glenn 3/45 (10 overs)		Kathryn Bryce 54 (57); Phoeba Turner 3/29 (9 overs)

The Blaze won by 5 wickets
Riverside Ground, Chester-le-Street
Umpires: David Millns and Jasmine Naeem

- The Blaze won the toss and elected to field.
- Points: The Blaze 5, Durham 0

Match 6
27 April 2025
10:30
Scorecard

Warwickshire; 289 (50 overs)	v	Essex; 181 (39 overs)
Emily Arlott 130 (141); Eva Gray 5/62 (10 overs)		Cordelia Griffith 53 (76); Chloe Brewer 3/18 (4 overs)

Warwickshire won by 108 runs
County Ground, Chelmsford
Umpires: James Tredwell and Rob White

- Essex won the toss and elected to field.
- Points: Warwickshire 5, Essex 0

Match 7
27 April 2025
10:30
Scorecard

Hampshire; 259/8 (50 overs)	v	Surrey; 209 (43.2 overs)
Ella McCaughan 64 (100); Alice Capsey 2/22 (6 overs)		Alice Capsey 57 (96); Linsey Smith 3/28 (10 overs)

Hampshire won by 50 runs
Rose Bowl, Southampton
Umpires: Nigel Llong and Ben Peverall

- Hampshire won the toss and elected to bat.
- Points: Hampshire 4, Surrey 0

Match 8
27 April 2025
10:30
Scorecard

Somerset; 205/9 (50 overs)	v	Lancashire; 207/3 (36.5 overs)
Alex Griffiths 46 (58); Kate Cross 2/27 (10 overs)		Evelyn Jones 97* (111); Ellie Anderson 1/32 (7 overs)

Lancashire won by 7 wickets
County Ground, Taunton
Umpires: Rose Fernando and Jack Shantry

- Lancashire won the toss and elected to field.
- Points: Lancashire 5, Somerset 0

=== Round 3 ===
Match 9
30 April 2025
10:30
Scorecard

Lancashire; 292/6 (50 overs)	v	Hampshire; 295/2 (47 overs)
Evelyn Jones 107 (134); Charli Knott 2/42 (10 overs)		Ella McCaughan 133* (141); Fi Morris 1/53 (10 overs)

Hampshire won by 8 wickets
Trafalgar Road Ground, Southport
Umpires: James Middlebrook and Jasmine Naeem

- Hampshire won the toss and elected to field.
- Points: Hampshire 4, Lancashire 0

Match 10
1 May 2025
10:30
Scorecard

Essex; 184 (42.5 overs)	v	Somerset; 185/5 (35.5 overs)
Amara Carr 67 (92); Heather Knight 3/7 (2.5 overs)		Heather Knight 45 (41); Abtaha Maqsood 2/56 (9.5 overs)

Somerset won by 5 wickets
Taunton Vale Sports Club Ground, Taunton
Umpires: Ian Blackwell and Julia Jarvis

- Somerset won the toss and elected to field.
- Points: Somerset 5, Essex 0

Match 11
30 April 2025
10:30
Scorecard

Surrey; 348/6 (50 overs)	v	Durham; 244 (45.1 overs)
Sophia Dunkley 92 (94); Phoebe Turner 2/58 (10 overs)		Leah Dobson 53 (59); Ryana MacDonald-Gay 3/38 (7 overs)

Surrey won by 104 runs
County Ground, Beckenham
Umpires: Rose Fernando and James Tredwell

- Surrey won the toss and elected to bat.
- Points: Surrey 5, Durham 0

Match 12
30 April 2025
10:30
Scorecard

The Blaze; 252/9 (50 overs)	v	Warwickshire; 211 (42.3 overs)
Sarah Bryce 52 (56); Emily Arlott 3/39 (10 overs)		Davina Perrin 53 (49); Kathryn Bryce 5/38 (8.3 overs)

The Blaze won by 41 runs
Edgbaston, Birmingham
Umpires: Amy Clark and David Millns

- Warwickshire won the toss and elected to field.
- The Blaze 4, Warwickshire 0

=== Round 4 ===
Match 13
4 May 2025
10:30
Scorecard

Durham; 216 (37.3 overs)	v	Somerset; 215/6 (37.3 overs)
Hollie Armitage 89 (94); Chloe Skelton 3/16 (2.5 overs)		Fran Wilson 68 (68); Katie Levick 2/33 (8 overs)

Somerset won by 4 wickets (DLS method)
Riverside Ground, Chester-le-Street
Umpires: Jasmine Naeem and Neil Pratt

- Somerset won the toss and elected to field.
- The match was reduced to 39 overs per side due to rain.
- Somerset were set a revised target of 213 runs from 39 overs due to rain.
- Points: Somerset 4, Durham 0

Match 14
4 May 2025
10:30
Scorecard

Lancashire; 230/8 (50 overs)	v	Essex; 231/5 (47.2 overs)
Evelyn Jones 57 (75); Abtaha Maqsood 3/43 (10 overs)		Jodi Grewcock 73* (91); Hannah Jones 3/39 (10 overs)

Essex won by 5 wickets
County Ground, Chelmsford
Umpires: Julia Jarvis and James Middlebrook

- Essex won the toss and elected to field.
- Points: Essex 4, Lancashire 0

Match 15
4 May 2025
10:30
Scorecard

Surrey; 313/7 (50 overs)	v	Warwickshire; 314/7 (46.3 overs)
Sophia Dunkley 102* (110); Emily Arlott 2/51 (10 overs)		Davina Perrin 69 (65); Alice Monaghan 2/44 (8 overs)

Warwickshire won by 3 wickets
County Ground, Beckenham
Umpires: Surendiran Shanmugam and Simon Widdup

- Surrey won the toss and elected to bat.
- Points: Warwickshire 4, Surrey 0

Match 16
4 May 2025
10:30
Scorecard

Hampshire; 189/7 (50 overs)	v	The Blaze; 192/3 (36.5 overs)
Ella McCaughan 57 (77); Sarah Glenn 3/36 (10 overs)		Tammy Beaumont 112* (113); Lauren Bell 2/36 (9 overs)

The Blaze won by 7 wickets
Trent Bridge, Nottingham
Umpires: Hassan Adnan and Gabi Brown

- Hampshire won the toss and elected to bat.
- Points: The Blaze 5, Hampshire 0

=== Round 5 ===
Match 17
6 May 2025
10:30
Scorecard

Essex; 231/9 (50 overs)	v	The Blaze; 235/5 (40.5 overs)
Grace Scrivens 120* (134); Orla Prendergast 3/32 (6 overs)		Tammy Beaumont 116* (117); Beth MacGregor 3/42 (7 overs)

The Blaze won by 5 wickets
Haslegrave Ground, Loughborough
Umpires: Naeem Ashraf and Neil Mallender

- The Blaze won the toss and elected to field.
- Points: The Blaze 5, Essex 0

Match 18
7 May 2025
10:30
Scorecard

Durham; 190/8 (50 overs)	v	Hampshire; 193/3 (36.5 overs)
Phoebe Turner 38 (42); Lauren Bell 2/38 (7 overs)		Charli Knott 58 (66); Katherine Fraser 1/19 (4 overs)

Hampshire won by 7 wickets
Arundel Castle Cricket Ground, Arundel
Umpires: Rose Fernando and Ben Peverall

- Durham won the toss and elected to bat.
- Points: Hampshire 5, Durham 0

Match 19
7 May 2025
10:30
Scorecard

Surrey; 296/8 (50 overs)	v	Lancashire; 299/5 (48 overs)
Alice Davidson-Richards 100 (102); Kate Cross 3/55 (10 overs)		Fi Morris 90* (76); Alice Monaghan 2/47 (8 overs)

Lancashire won by 5 wickets
Trafalgar Road Ground, Southport
Umpires: Gabi Brown and Anthony Harris

- Surrey won the toss and elected to bat.
- Points: Lancashire 4, Surrey 0

Match 20
7 May 2025
10:30
Scorecard

Somerset; 297/6 (50 overs)	v	Warwickshire; 249 (48.5 overs)
Sophie Luff 111* (105); Emily Arlott 4/61 (10 overs)		Sterre Kalis 60 (49); Alex Griffiths 2/20 (8 overs)

Somerset won by 48 runs
Edgbaston, Birmingham
Umpires: Amy Clark and James Middlebrook

- Warwickshire won the toss and elected to field.
- Points: Somerset 4, Warwickshire 0

=== Round 6 ===
Match 21
11 May 2025
10:30
Scorecard

Warwickshire; 243/9 (50 overs)	v	Durham; 244/7 (46.3 overs)
Charis Pavely 57 (71); Sophia Turner 3/58 (10 overs)		Suzie Bates 72 (85); Emily Arlott 2/49 (9 overs)

Durham won by 3 wickets
Riverside Ground, Chester-le-Street
Umpires: Hassan Adnan and Naeem Ashraf

- Warwickshire won the toss and elected to bat.
- Points: Durham 4, Warwickshire 0

Match 22
11 May 2025
10:30
Scorecard

Hampshire; 273/5 (50 overs)	v	Essex; 256/8 (50 overs)
Georgia Adams 110* (130); Kate Coppack 2/44 (8 overs)		Grace Scrivens 101 (120); Linsey Smith 4/33 (10 overs)

Hampshire won by 17 runs
Rose Bowl, Southampton
Umpires: Julia Jarvis and James Tredwell

- Essex won the toss and elected to field.
- Points: Hampshire 4, Essex 0

Match 23
11 May 2025
10:30
Scorecard

The Blaze; 222 (48.2 overs)	v	Lancashire; 226/6 (47.2 overs)
Ella Claridge 63 (74); Grace Potts 4/37 (9.2 overs)		Emma Lamb 74 (92); Kirstie Gordon 3/33 (10 overs)

Lancashire won by 4 wickets
Old Trafford, Manchester
Umpires: Anthony Harris and Simon Widdup

- Lancashire won the toss and elected to field.
- Points: Lancashire 4, The Blaze 0

Match 24
11 May 2025
10:30
Scorecard

Surrey; 306/7 (44 overs)	v	Somerset; 215 (40.5 overs)
Bryony Smith 110 (103); Amanda-Jade Wellington 4/47 (9 overs)		Amanda-Jade Wellington 36 (29); Danielle Gregory 2/43 (9 overs)

Surry won by 101 runs (DLS Method)
County Ground, Taunton
Umpires: Gabi Brown and Martin Saggers

- Somerset won the toss and elected to field.
- The match was reduced to 44 overs per side due to rain.
- Somerset were set a revised target of 317 runs from 44 overs.
- Points: Surry 5, Somerset 0

=== Round 7 ===
Match 25
13 May 2025
10:30
Scorecard

Hampshire; 213 (50 overs)	v	Somerset; 182 (46 overs)
Charli Knott 64 (102); Alex Griffiths 2/27 (6 overs)		Sophie Luff 74 (108); Georgia Adams 3/36 (10 overs)

Hampshire won by 31 runs (DLS method)
County Ground, Taunton
Umpires: Rose Fernando and Ben Peverall

- Hampshire won the toss and elected to bat.
- Somerset were set a revised target of 214 runs from 49 overs.
- Points: Hampshire 4, Somerset 0

Match 26
14 May 2025
10:30
Scorecard

Essex; 178 (40.5 overs)	v	Durham; 182/4 (38.2 overs)
Ariana Dowse 43* (79); Mady Villiers 3/28 (8.5 overs)		Mia Rogers 66* (88); Beth MacGregor 2/45 (8 overs)

Durham won by 6 wickets
County Ground, Chelmsford
Umpires: Julia Jarvis and Surendiran Shanmugam

- Durham won the toss and elected to field.
- Points: Durham 5, Essex 0

Match 27
14 May 2025
10:30
Scorecard

The Blaze; 346/9 (50 overs)	v	Surrey; 346/9 (50 overs)
Georgia Elwiss 82 (67); Danielle Gregory 3/63 (8 overs)		Alice Capsey 125 (96); Georgia Elwiss 3/35 (7 overs)

Match tied
County Ground, Beckenham
Umpires: James Tredwell and Sue Redfern

- Surrey won the toss and elected to field.
- Points: The Blaze 2, Surrey 2

Match 28
14 May 2025
10:30
Scorecard

Lancashire; 276/8 (50 overs)	v	Warwickshire; 175 (47.2 overs)
Emma Lamb 88 (84); Georgia Davis 3/45 (9 overs)		Katie George 35 (38); Fi Morris 5/48 (10 overs)

Lancashire won by 101 runs
Edgbaston, Birmingham
Umpires: Amy Clark and Russell Warren

- Lancashire won the toss and elected to bat.
- Points: Lancashire 5, Warwickshire 0

=== Round 8 ===
Match 29
19 May 2025
10:30
Scorecard

Surrey; 259/9 (50 overs)	v	Essex; 245 (46.2 overs)
Kalea Moore 66 (70); Eva Gray 5/52 (10 overs)		Jo Gardner 73* (46); Danielle Gregory 4/58 (10 overs)

Surrey won by 14 runs
County Ground, Chelmsford
Umpires: Gabi Brown and Jack Shantry

- Essex won the toss and elected to field.
- Points: Surrey 4, Essex 0

Match 30
19 May 2025
10:30
Scorecard

Warwickshire; 243/7 (50 overs)	v	Hampshire; 246/7 (49.2) overs
Abbey Freeborn 94* (129); Georgia Adams 2/37 (10 overs)		Charli Knott 82 (88); Georgia Davis 3/35 (10 overs)

Hampshire won by 3 wickets
Arundel Castle Cricket Ground, Arundel
Umpires: Julia Jarvis and Martin Saggers

- Warwickshire won the toss and elected to bat.
- Points: Hampshire 4, Warwickshire 0

Match 31
19 May 2025
10:30
Scorecard

Lancashire; 239 (49.4 overs)	v	Durham; 204 (45.1 overs)
Emma Lamb 84 (94); Mady Villiers 3/39 (10 overs)		Suzie Bates 63 (90); Sohpie Morris 5/33 (8 overs)

Lancashire won by 35 runs
Stanley Park, Blackpool
Umpires: Naeem Ashraf and Russell Warren

- Durham won the toss and elected to field.
- Points: Lancashire 4, Durham 0

Match 32
20 May 2025
10:30
Scorecard

Somerset; 304/7 (50 overs)	v	The Blaze; 305/6 (49 overs)
Sophie Luff 72 (76); Georgia Elwiss 1/20 (6 overs)		Maddy Green 97 (90); Olivia Barnes 2/49 (9 overs)

The Blaze won by 4 wickets
Haslegrave Ground, Loughborough
Umpires: Hassan Adnan and Jasmine Naeem

- The Blaze won the toss and elected to field.
- Points: The Blaze 4, Somerset 0

=== Round 9 ===
Match 33
24 July 2025
10:30
Scorecard

Durham; 257 (50 overs)	v	Lancashire; 168 (38.3 overs)
Hollie Armitage 111 (123); Alana King 3/31 (10 overs)		Kate Cross 34 (49); Katherine Fraser 3/33 (8 overs)

Durham won by 89 runs
Riverside Ground, Chester-le-Street
Umpires: Graham Lloyd and Sue Redfern

- Durham won the toss and elected to bat.
- Points: Durham 5, Lancashire 0

Match 34
24 July 2025
10:30
Scorecard

Somerset; 312/6 (49.2 overs)	v	Essex
Niamh Holland 78 (76); Sophia Smale 2/56 (10 overs)

No result
County Ground, Chelmsford
Umpires: Julia Jarvis and James Middlebrook

- Essex won the toss and elected to field.
- No play was further possible due to rain.
- Points: Essex 2, Somerset

Match 35
24 July 2025
10:30
Scorecard

Hampshire; 278 (50 overs)	v	Surrey; 217/6 (30.4 overs)
Freya Kemp 58 (49); Phoebe Franklin 3/43 (10 overs)		Alice Davidson-Richards 72* (61); Ellyse Perry 2/32 (7 overs)

Surrey won by 4 wickets (DLS method)
Woodbridge Road, Guildford
Umpires: Naeeem Ashraf and Grace Bambury

- Surrey won the toss and elected to field.
- Surrey were set a revised target of 214 runs from 31 overs due to rain.
- Points: Surrey 4, Hampshire 0

Match 36
24 July 2025
10:30
Scorecard

The Blaze; 218/6 (39 overs)	v	Warwickshire; 171 (34.3 overs)
Marie Kelly 66 (61); Georgia Davis 2/33 (8 overs)		Natasha Wraith 75 (71); Kathryn Bryce 3/18 (6 overs)

The Blaze won by 47 runs
Lindum Sports Club Ground, Lincoln
Umpires: Gabi Brown and Simon Widdup

- The Blaze won the toss and elected to bat.
- The match was reduced to 39 overs per side due to rain.
- Points: The Blaze 5, Warwickshire 0

=== Round 10 ===
Match 37
30 July 2025
10:30
Scorecard

Hampshire; 291/7 (50 overs)	v	The Blaze; 211 (44.5 overs)
Freya Kemp 109 (92); Cassidy McCarthy 3/51 (10 0vers)		Georgia Elwiss 87 (97); Daisy Gibb 3/21 (7 overs)

Hampshire won by 80 runs
Rose Bowl, Southampton
Umpires: Neil Bainton and Rose Fernando

- Hampshire won the toss and elected to bat.
- Points: Hampshire 5, The Blaze 0

Match 38
30 July 2025
10:30
Scorecard

Lancashire; 306/4 (50 overs)	v	Essex; 168 (35.3 overs)
Emma Lamb 142 (109); Grace Scrivens 2/53 (9 overs)		Jodi Grewcock 52 (57); Alana King 4/36 (8.3 overs)

Lancashire won by 138 runs
Sedbergh School, Sedbergh
Umpires: Hassan Adnan and Jasmine Naeem

- Essex won the toss and elected to field.
- Points: Lancashire 5, Essex 0

Match 39
30 July 2025
10:30
Scorecard

Durham; 315/9 (50 overs)	v	Somerset; 210 (40.2 overs)
Suzie Bates 163 (140); Chloe Skelton 3/62 (10 overs)		Jess Hazell 50 (55); Mady Villiers 3/30 (7.2 overs)

County Ground, Taunton
Umpires: Julia Jarvis and Mark Newell

- Durham won the toss and elected to bat.
- Points: Durham 5, Somerset 0

Match 40
30 July 2025
10:30
Scorecard

Warwickshire; 239 (42.5 overs)	v	Surrey; 240/7 (36.4 overs)
Davina Perrin 113 (125); Ryana MacDonald-Gay 4/47 (6.5 overs)		Alice Capsey 79 (73); Issy Wong 2/45 (7 overs)

Surrey won by 3 wickets
Edgbaston, Birmingham
Umpires: Paul Baldwin and Jack Shantry

- Surrey won the toss and elected to field.
- Points: Surrey 5, Warwickshire 0

=== Round 11 ===
Match 41
4 September 2025
10:30
Scorecard

Hampshire; 101/7 (17 overs)	v	Essex; 97/6 (17 overs)
Freya Kemp 31 (20); Esmae MacGregor 2/17 (4 overs)		Sophie Munro 28* (19); Freya Davies 2/15 (4 overs)

Hampshire won by 4 wickets
County Ground, Chelmsford
Umpires: Rose Fernando and Surendiran Shanmugam

- Essex won the toss and elected to field.
- The match was reduced to 17 overs per side due to rain.
- Points: Hampshire 4, Essex 0

Match 42
4 September 2025
10:30
Scorecard

Lancashire; 169/9 (44 overs)	v	Somerset; 167/5 (34.2 overs)
Kate Cross 51 (58); Ellie Anderson 3/44 (10 overs)		Danielle Gibson 44* (36); Danielle Collins 2/11 (2 overs)

Somerset won by 5 wickets (DLS method)
Old Trafford, Manchester
Umpires: Gabi Brown and Sue Redfern

- Somerset won the toss and elected to field.
- The match was reduced to 44 overs per side due to rain.
- Somerset were set a revised target of 164 runs from 44 overs due to rain.
- Points: Somerset 5, Lancashire 0

Match 43
4 September 2025
10:30
Scorecard

The Blaze	v	Surrey

No result
Trent Bridge, Nottingham
Umpires: Neil Mallender and Neil Pratt

- Surrey won the toss and elected to field.
- No play was possible due to rain.
- Points: The Blaze 2, Surrey 2

Match 44
4 September 2025
10:30
Scorecard

Warwickshire	v	Durham

Match abandoned
Edgbaston, Birmingham

- No toss.
- No play was possible due to rain.
- Points: Warwickshire 2, Durham 2

=== Round 12 ===
Match 45
7 September 2025
10:30
Scorecard

Durham; 224/9 (50 overs)	v	Hampshire; 174/1 (23.4 overs)
Hollie Armitage 88 (105); Georgia Adams 3/41 (10 overs)		Maia Bouchier 93* (84); Grace Thompson 1/37 (7 overs)

Hampshire won by 9 wickets (DLS method)
Riverside Ground, Chester-le-Street
Umpires: Amy Clark and Sue Redfern

- Durham won the toss and elected to bat.
- Hampshire were set a revised target of 171 runs from 37 overs due to rain.
- Points: Hampshire 5, Durham 0

Match 46
7 September 2025
10:30
Scorecard

The Blaze; 252/6 (33 overs)	v	Somerset; 169 (22.2 overs)
Sarah Bryce 68 (54); Charlie Dean 3/50 (7 overs)		Amanda-Jade Wellington 53 (28); Cassidy McCarthy 3/12 (4 overs)

The Blaze won by 44 runs (DLS method)
County Ground, Taunton
Umpires: Gabi Brown and Ben Peverall

- Somerset won the toss and elected to field.
- The match was reduced to 33 overs per side due to rain.
- Somerset were set a revised target of 214 runs from 26 overs due to rain.
- Points: The Blaze 5, Somerset 0

Match 47
7 September 2025
10:30
Scorecard

Surrey; 225 (49.5 overs)	v	Lancashire; 227/6 (46 overs)
Kalea Moore 67 (78); Grace Potts 3/31 (6.5 overs)		Seren Smale 67* (70); Alexa Stonehouse 3/34 (10 overs)

Lancashire won by 4 wickets
County Ground, Beckenham
Umpires: Rose Fernando and Anna Harris

- Lancashire won the toss and elected to field.
- Points: Lancashire 4, Surrey 0

Match 48
7 September 2025
10:30
Scorecard

Essex; 235/7 (32 overs)	v	Warwickshire; 204/8 (32 overs)
Jo Gardner 47 (34); Georgia Davis 4/35 (7 overs)		Amuruthaa Surenkumar 56 (54); Abtaha Maqsood 3/34 (6 overs)

Essex won by 27 runs (DLS method)
Edgbaston, Birmingham
Umpires: Neil Bainton and Mohammed Waseem

- Warwickshire won the toss and elected to field.
- The match was reduced to 32 overs per side due to rain.
- Points: Essex 4, Warwickshire 0

=== Round 13 ===
Match 49
10 September 2025
10:30
Scorecard

Hampshire	v	Somerset

Match abandoned
Rose Bowl, Southampton

- No toss.
- No play was possible due to rain.
- Points: Hampshire 2, Somerset 2

Match 50
10 September 2025
10:30
Scorecard

Warwickshire; 283/7 (50 overs)	v	Lancashire; 172/5 (21.1 overs)
Abigail Freeborn 60 (86); Hannah Jones 2/46 (9 overs)		Gaby Lewis 75 (53); Phoebe Brett 1/21 (4 overs)

Lancashire won by 5 wickets (DLS method)
Rookwood Cricket Ground, Sale
Umpires: Naeem Ashraf and Phil Mustard

- Lancashire won the toss and elected to field.
- Lancashire were set a revised target of 172 runs form 22 overs due to rain.
- Points: Lancashire 4, Warwickshire 0

Match 51
10 September 2025
10:30
Scorecard

Surrey; 313/5 (45 overs)	v	Essex
Emma Jones 141 (117); Jodi Grewcock 1/11 (2.3 overs)

No result
County Ground, Beckenham
Umpires: Rose Fernando and Connor McGarry

- Essex won the toss and elected to field.
- The match was reduced to 45 overs per side due to rain.
- Rain prevented any further play.
- Points: Surrey 2, Essex 2

Match 52
10 September 2025
10:30
Scorecard

Durham; 252/9 (50 overs)	v	The Blaze; 256/6 (47.3 overs)
Mady Villiers 79 (88); Georgia Elwiss 2/34 (9 overs)		Orla Prendergast 67 (79); Katie Levick 2/48 (10 overs)

The Blaze won by 4 wickets
County Ground, Derby
Umpires: David Millns and Sue Redfern

- Durham won the toss and elected to bat.
- Points: The Blaze 4, Durham 0

=== Round 14 ===
Match 53
13 September 2025
10:30
Scorecard

Surrey; 290/7 (48 overs)	v	Durham; 138 (23 overs)
Jemima Spence 68 (63); Katie Levick 2/40 (10 overs)		Emma Marlow 31 (32); Danielle Gregory 3/24 (4 overs)

Surrey won by 86 runs (DLS method)
Riverside Ground, Chester-le-Street
Umpires: Neil Pratt and Simon Widdup

- Durham won the toss and elected to field.
- The match was reduced to 48 overs per side due to rain.
- Durham were set a revised target of 225 runs from 29 overs due to rain.
- Points: Surrey 5, Durham 0

Match 54
13 September 2025
10:30
Scorecard

Essex; 211 (47.4 overs)	v	The Blaze; 59/0 (11.2 overs)
Sophia Smale 41 (61); Orla Prendergast 3/43 (9 overs)		Sarah Bryce 33* (37)

The Blaze won by 35 runs (DLS method)
County Ground, Chelmsford
Umpires: Gabi Brown and David Millns

- The Blaze won the toss and elected to field.
- Rain prevented any further play.
- The Blaze were 35 runs ahead in the DLS target when rain interrupted the match.
- Points: The Blaze 5, Essex 0

Match 55
13 September 2025
10:30
Scorecard

Hampshire	v	Lancashire

Match abandoned
Arundel Castle Cricket Ground, Arundel

- No toss.
- No play was possible due to rain.
- Points: Hampshire 2, Lancashire 2

Match 56
13 September 2025
10:30
Scorecard

Warwickshire; 175 (41 overs)	v	Somerset; 176/6 (27.1 overs)
Natasha Wraith 39 (47); Amanda-Jade Wellington 2/28 (9 overs)		Danielle Gibson 50 (30); Hannah Baker 3/44 (7.1 overs)

Somerset won by 4 wickets
County Ground, Taunton
Umpires: Anthony Harris and Surendiran Shanmugam

- Somerset won the toss and elected to field.
- Points: Somerset 5, Warwickshire 0

== League Two ==
=== Round 1 ===
Match 1
19 April 2025
10:30
Scorecard

Glamorgan; 178/5 (25 overs)	v	Sussex Sharks; 125/9 (25 overs)
Bethan Gammon 72 (56); Eve O'Neill 3/14 (5 overs)		Daisy Gibb 24 (21); Poppy Tulloch 4/28 (5 overs)

Glamorgan won by 53 runs
Sophia Gardens, Cardiff
Umpires: Amy Coyne and Dan Pedley

- Sussex Sharks won the toss and elected to field.
- The match was reduced to 25 overs per side due to rain.
- Points: Glamorgan 5, Sussex Sharks 0

Match 2
19 April 2025
10:30
Scorecard

Gloucestershire; 206 (38 overs)	v	Derbyshire Falcons; 197/8 (38 overs)
Emily Geach 38 (42); Caitlin McDonald 3/36 (7 overs)		Megan Pittman 39* (39); Alice Hill 4/39 (8 overs)

Gloucestershire won by 9 runs
County Ground, Bristol
Umpires: Rehma Chandaria and Jack Shantry

- Derbyshire Falcons won the toss and elected to field.
- The match was reduced to 38 overs per side due to rain.
- Points: Gloucestershire 4, Derbyshire Falcons 0

Match 3
19 April 2025
10:30
Scorecard

Worcestershire Rapids; 228 (48.1 overs)	v	Yorkshire; 114 (23.1 overs)
Bryony Gillgrass 48 (60); Amelia Love 4/39 (10 overs)		Sterre Kalis 51 (55); Flora Bertwistle 4/32 (6.1 overs)

Worcestershire Rapids won by 114 runs
Headingley, Leeds
Umpires: Neil Mallender and Matthew Tyers

- Yorkshire won the toss and elected to field.
- Points: Worcestershire Rapids 5, Yorkshire 0

Match 4
20 April 2025
10:30
Scorecard

Northamptonshire Steelbacks; 264/6 (50 overs)	v	Leicestershire; 79 (32.4 overs)
Michaela Kirk 125* (126); Emma Thatcher 2/38 (10 overs)		D'nica Roff 23 (45); Ella Phillips 4/17 (9 overs)

Northamptonshire Steelbacks won by 185 runs
Grace Road, Leicester
Umpires: Mel Juniper and Sue Redfern

- Northamptonshire Steelbacks won the toss and elected to bat.
- Points: Northamptonshire Steelbacks 5, Leicestershire 0

Match 5
20 April 2025
10:30
Scorecard

Kent; 66 (20.4 overs)	v	Middlesex; 69/2 (12.1 overs)
Amy Gordon 11 (10); Gaya Gole 6/30 (9 overs)		Issy Routledge 21* (35); Megan Belt 1/16 (2 overs)

Middlesex won by 8 wickets
Brunton Memorial Ground, Radlett
Umpires: Tracey Murphy and Hemal Wijesuriya

- Middlesex won the toss and elected to field.
- Points: Middlesex 5, Kent 0

=== Round 2 ===
Match 6
26 April 2025
10:30
Scorecard

Derbyshire Falcons; 189 (44 overs)	v	Kent; 190/1 (35.2 overs)
Lara Shaw 65 (52); Amy Gordon 2/24 (8 overs)		Amy Gordon 111* (110); Rhiannon Knowling-Davies 1/48 (10 overs)

Kent won by 9 wickets
St Lawrence Ground, Canterbury
Umpires: Mel Juniper and Kylie White

- Kent won the toss and elected to field.
- Points: Kent 5, Derbyshire Falcons 0

Match 7
26 April 2025
10:30
Scorecard

Sussex Sharks; 77 (33 overs)	v	Yorkshire; 80/1 (12.4 overs)
Jazz Westley 20 (34); Maddie Ward 3/5 (5 overs)		Lauren Winfield-Hill 47* (43); Kali-Ann Doherty 1/16 (1.4 overs)

Yorkshire won by 9 wickets
County Ground, Hove
Umpires: Neil Bainton and Hemal Wijesuriya

- Sussex Sharks won the toss and elected to bat.
- Points: Yorkshire 5, Sussex Sharks 0

Match 8
27 April 2025
10:30
Scorecard

Northamptonshire Steelbacks; 233 (48.1 overs)	v	Gloucestershire; 199 (47 overs)
Michaela Kirk 88 (106); Liv Daniels 2/29 (10 overs)		Melissa Story 53 (97); Amelia Kemp 4/29 (7 overs)

Northamptonshire Steelbacks won by 34 runs
Geddington Cricket Club, Geddington
Umpires: Nathan Hewitt and Joanne Ibbotson

- Northamptonshire Steelbacks won the toss and elected to bat.
- Points: Northamptonshire Steelbacks 4, Gloucestershire 0

Match 9
27 April 2025
10:30
Scorecard

Middlesex; 289 (49.2 overs)	v	Glamorgan; 278/9 (50 overs)
Finty Trussler 66 (85); Emma Jones 3/80 (10 overs)		Emma Jones 147* (101); Issy Routledge 2/33 (7 overs)

Middlesex won by 11 runs
Newport Stadium, Newport
Umpires: Rehma Chandaria and Dean Daniels

- Glamorgan won the toss and elected to field.
- Points: Middlesex 4, Glamorgan 0

Match 10
27 April 2025
10:30
Scorecard

Worcestershire Rapids; 265/8 (50 overs)	v	Leicestershire Foxes; 202/7 (50 overs)
Clare Boycott 75 (138); Holly Whitfield 4/47 (10 overs)		Becki Brooker 57 (117); Amy Wheeler 3/40 (10 overs)

Worcestershire Rapids won by 63 runs
Uppingham School, Uppingham
Umpires: Neil Mallender and Muhammad Qureshi

- Worcestershire Rapids won the toss and elected to bat.
- Poinst: Worcestershire Rapids 5, Leicestershire Foxes 0

=== Round 3 ===
Match 11
3 May 2025
10:30
Scorecard

Yorkshire; 361/6 (50 overs)	v	Derbyshire Falcons; 66 (22.3 overs)
Ami Campbell 165* (105); Gemma Rose 4/73 (10 overs)		Ella Porter 23* (36); Olivia Thomas 4/16 (5 overs)

Derbyshire Falcons won by 315 runs
County Ground, Derby
Umpires: Amy Coyne and Neil Mallender

- Derbyshire won the toss and elected to field.
- Points: Yorkshire 5, Derbyshire Falcons 0

Match 12
3 May 2025
10:30
Scorecard

Glamorgan; 304/8 (50 overs)	v	Gloucestershire; 77 (30 overs)
Bethan Gammon 129* (101); Izzy Patel 4/39 (10 overs)		Emily Geach 11 (19); Gemma Porter 3/14 (8 overs)

Glamorgan won by 227 runs
County Ground, Bristol
Umpires: Mel Juniper and Ben Peverall

- Glamorgan won the toss and elected to bat.
- Points: Glamorgan 5, Gloucestershire 0

Match 13
3 May 2025
10:30
Scorecard

Kent; 117 (40.2 overs)	v	Leicestershire Foxes; 121/3 (24 overs)
Genevieve Jeer 27 (45); Ellie Phillips 2/7 (8 overs)		Ellen Watson 29 (40); Megan Belt 1/22 (6 overs)

Leicestershire Foxes won by 7 wickets
St Lawrence Ground, Canterbury
Umpires: Matt Johnson and James Tredwell

- Leicestershire Foxes won the toss and elected to field.
- Points: Leicestershire Foxes 5, Kent 0

Match 14
3 May 2025
10:30
Scorecard

Northamptonshire Steelbacks; 144 (46.2 overs)	v	Middlesex; 145/6 (33.3 overs)
Mabel Reid 29 (53); Sarah Pearson 3/29 (6.2 overs)		Artemis Downer 47 (70); Ella Phillips 3/40 (9.3 overs)

Middlesex won by 4 wickets
County Ground, Northampton
Umpires: Rehma Chandaria and Ben Debenham

- Middlesex won the toss and elected to field.
- Points: Middlesex 5, Northamptonshire Steelbacks 0

Match 15
3 May 2025
10:30
Scorecard

Sussex Sharks; 250/5 (50 overs)	v	Worcestershire Rapids; 221 (41.4 overs)
Mollie Adams 104 (146); Phoebe Brett 1/31 (10 overs)		Gwen Davies 53 (72); Anna Buckle 5/27 (6.4 overs)

Sussex Sharks won by 29 runs
New Road, Worcester
Umpires: Muhammad Qureshi and Hemal Wijesuriya

- Worcestershire Rapids won the toss and elected to field.
- Points: Sussex Sharks 4, Worcestershire Rapids 0

=== Round 4 ===
Match 16
15 May 2025
10:30
Scorecard

Derbyshire Falcons; 213/8 (50 overs)	v	Glamorgan; 214/1 (37 overs)
Ella Porter 80 (130); Gemma Porter 2/28 (10 overs)		Daisy Jeanes 115* (113); Harriett Parkin 1/37 (6 overs)

Glamorgan won by 9 wickets
Duffield Cricket Club, Duffield
Umpires: Gabi Brown and Pam Orton

- Derbyshire Falcons won the toss and elected to bat.
- Points: Glamorgan 5, Derbyshire Falcons 0

Match 17
15 May 2025
10:30
Scorecard

Middlesex; 336/3 (50 overs)	v	Gloucestershire; 128 (41.1 overs)
Finty Trussler 137* (118); Katie Dolman 3/52 (10 overs)		Emily Geach 32 (56); Gaya Gole 5/27 (9 overs)

Middlesex won by 208 runs
Brunton Memorial Ground, Radlett
Umpires: Mel Juniper and Kylie White

- Middlesex won the toss and elected to bat.
- Points: Middlesex 5, Gloucestershire 0

Match 18
15 May 2025
10:30
Scorecard

Northamptonshire Steelbacks; 161 (38 overs)	v	Worcestershire Rapids; 82 (33 overs)
Gemma Marriott 51* (55); Jess Beach 5/30 (8 overs)		Sophie Beech 20 (37); Anisha Patel 3/8 (4 overs)

Northamptonshire Steelbacks won by 79 runs
County Ground, Northampton
Umpires: Brian Jones and Martin Kellaway

- Northamptonshire Steelbacks won the toss and elected to bat.
- Points: Northamptonshire Steelbacks 5, Worcestershire Rapids 0

Match 19
15 May 2025
10:30
Scorecard

Sussex Sharks; 300/8 (50 overs)	v	Kent; 258/6 (50 overs)
Mollie Adams 76 (98); Amy Gordon 1/30 (7 overs)		Megan Sturge 93 (96); Talitha Stanley 2/23 (6 overs)

Sussex Sharks won by 42 runs
County Ground, Hove
Umpires: Sean Lilley and Hemal Wijesuriya

- Kent won the toss and elected to field.
- Points: Sussex Sharks 4, Kent 0

Match 20
15 May 2025
10:30
Scorecard

Leicestershire Foxes; 205/8 (50 overs)	v	Yorkshire; 206/4 (33.4 overs)
Francesca Sweet 52 (51); Grace Hall 2/20 (7 overs)		Ami Campbell 60* (35); Ellie Phillips 2/51 (8.4 overs)

Yorkshire won by 6 wickets
Clifton Park Ground, York
Umpires: Phil Prince and Jane Pratt

- Leicestershire Foxes won the toss and elected to bat.
- Points: Yorkshire 5, Leicestershire Foxes 0

=== Round 5 ===
Match 21
2 August 2025
10:30
Scorecard

Derbyshire Falcons; 135 (33.3 overs)	v	Northamptonshire Steelbacks; 136/2 (28.3 overs)
Jessica Couser 40 (35); Anisha Patel 4/10 (5 overs)		Michaela Kirk 65* (80); Maria Andrews 1/15 (6 overs)

Northamptonshire Steelbacks won by 8 wickets
County Ground, Derby
Umpires: Amy Coyne and Laura Spragg

- Northamptonshire Steelbacks won the toss and elected to field.
- Pointss: Northamptonshire Steelbacks 5, Derbyshire Falcons 0

Match 22
2 August 2025
10:30
Scorecard

Glamorgan; 261/5 (50 overs)	v	Leicestershire Foxes; 136 (34.1 overs)
Abbey Freeborn 108 (127); Holly Whitfield 1/17 (3.4 overs)		Flora Davies 23 (37); Gemma Porter 3/25 (6.1 overs)

Glamorgan won by 125 runs
The Gnoll, Neath
Umpires: Erica Turner, Hemal Wijesuriya

- Leicestershire Foxes won the toss and elected to field.
- Points: Glamorgan 5, Leicestershire Foxes 0

Match 23
2 August 2025
10:30
Scorecard

Gloucestershire; 286/9 (50 overs)	v	Sussex Sharks; 167 (38.5 overs)
Georgina Cant 91 (77); Anna Buckle 4/43 (7 overs)		Chiara Green 63 (80); Chloe Skelton 4/30 (10 overs)

Gloucestershire won by 119 runs
County Ground, Hove
Umpires: Mel Juniper and Amanda Wixon

- Gloucestershire won the toss and elected to bat.
- Points: Gloucestershire 5, Sussex Sharks 0

Match 24
2 August 2025
10:30
Scorecard

Middlesex; 192/9 (50 overs)	v	Yorkshire; 185 (46.5 overs)
Pippa Sproul 98* (118); Jess Woolston 5/45 (10 overs)		Ines Blackwell 30 (44); Issy Routledge 4/42 (9.5 overs)

Middlesex won by 7 runs
Headingley, Leeds
Umpires: Rehma Chandaria and Jane Pratt

- Yorkshire won the toss and elected to field.
- Points: Middlesex 4, Yorkshire 0

Match 25
3 August 2025
Scorecard

Worcestershire Rapids; 244 (49.2 overs)	v	Kent; 143 (35.5 overs)
Bryony Gillgrass 80 (78); Ella Darlington 2/21 (6 overs)		Megan Sturge 74 (87); Caitlin Baker-Smith 3/14 (4.5 overs)

Worcestershire Rapids won by 101 runs
Royal Grammar School Worcester, Worcester
Umpires: Kelly Alcock and Dean Daniels

- Kent won the toss and elected to field.
- Points: Worcestershire Rapids 5, Kent 0

=== Round 6 ===
Match 26
9 August 2025
10:30
Scorecard

Gloucestershire; 291 (49.4 overs)	v	Worcestershire Rapids; 238 (45.4 overs)
Becca Halliday 62 (86); Sophie Beech 3/41 (9.4 overs)		Clare Boycott 54 (70); Chloe Skelton 3/40 (10 overs)

Gloucestershire won by 53 runs
County Ground, Bristol
Umpires: Sharon Grigg and Mel Juniper

- Gloucestershire won the toss and elected to bat.
- Points: Gloucestershire 4, Worcestershire Rapids 0

Match 27
9 August 2025
10:30
Scorecard

Kent; 163 (48.4 overs)	v	Northamptonshire Steelbacks; 165/7 (29.4 overs)
Megan Sturge 40 (65); Emily Carpenter 3/26 (7 overs)		Amelia Kemp 54 (63); Olivia Barnes 4/39 (9.4 overs)

Northamptonshire Steelbacks won by 3 wickets
County Ground, Beckenham
Umpires: Rehma Chandaria and Tracey Murphy

- Northamptonshire Steelbacks won the toss and elected to field.
- Points: Northamptonshire Steelbacks 5, Kent 0

Match 28
9 August 2025
10:30
Scorecard

Derbyshire Falcons; 76 (29.1 overs)	v	Middlesex; 79/2 (9.5 overs)
Harriett Parkin 25* (27); Anaya Patel 4/17 (9.1 overs)		Issy Routledge 38* (28); Gemma Rose 2/22 (3 overs)

Middlesex won by 8 wickets
Merchant Taylors' School Ground, Northwood
Umpires: Kirsty Blackham and Hemal Wijesuriya

- Middlesex won the toss and elected to field.
- Points: Middlesex 5, Derbyshire Falcons 0

Match 29
9 August 2025
Scorecard

Sussex Sharks; 272/8 (50 overs)	v	Leicestershire Foxes; 216 (45.3 overs)
Izzy Collis 55 (91); April Herathge 3/53 (10 overs)		Becki Brooker 51 (74); Ava Lee 3/41 (10 overs)

Sussex Sharks won by 56 runs
County Ground, Hove
Umpires: Dean Daniels and Kylie White

- Sussex won the toss and elected to bat.
- Points: Sussex Sharks 5, Leicestershire Foxes 0

Match 30
9 August 2025
10:30
Scorecard

Yorkshire; 172 (39.4 overs)	v	Glamorgan; 173/6 (45.5 overs)
Ria Fackrell 36* (48); Poppy Walker 3/40 (8.4 overs)		Lauren Parfitt 49 (87); Ria Fackrell 3/34 (10 overs)

Glamorgan won by 4 wickets
Weetwood Playing Fields, Leeds
Umpires: Amy Coyne and Dan Pedley

- Yorkshire won the toss and elected to bat.
- Points: Glamorgan 4, Yorkshire 0

=== Round 7 ===
Match 31
16 August 2025
10:30
Scorecard

Yorkshire; 281/7 (50 overs)	v	Gloucestershire; 131 (35.2 overs)
Ami Campbell 98* (61); Liv Daniels 2/40 (10 overs)		Becca Halliday 33 (52); Olivia Thomas 3/30 (8 overs)

Yorkshire won by 150 runs
County Ground, Bristol
Umpires: Sharon Grigg and Hemal Wijesuriya

- Yorkshire won the toss and elected to bat.
- Points: Yorkshire 5, Gloucestershire 0

Match 32
16 August 2025
10:30
Scorecard

Kent; 227/7 (50 overs)	v	Glamorgan; 228/4 (41.3 overs)
Elsa Barnfather 65 (101); Poppy Walker 2/46 (10 overs)		Lauren Parfitt 111* (125); Izzy James 2/37 (10 overs)

Glamorgan won by 6 wickets
County Ground, Beckenham
Umpires: Mel Juniper and Amanda Wixon

- Kent won the toss and elected to bat.
- Points: Glamorgan 4, Kent 0

Match 33
16 August 2025
10:30
Scorecard

Middlesex; 295/5 (50 overs)	v	Leicestershire Foxes; 172 (37.1 overs)
Saskia Horley 114 (105); Francesca Sweet 2/62 (10 overs)		[Becki Brooker 54 (66); Sarah Pearson 6/23 (8.1 overs)

Middlesex won by 123 runs
Denton Road, Horton
Umpires: Rehma Chandaria and Kylie White

- Middlesex won the toss and elected to bat.
- Points: Middlesex 5, Leicestershire Foxes 0

Match 34
16 August 2025
10:30
Scorecard

Northamptonshire Steelbacks; 171 (43.5 overs)	v	Sussex Sharks; 114 (26.1 overs)
Chloe Hill 28 (43); Ava Lee 5/18 (10 overs)		Mollie Adams 40 (35); Ella Phillips 4/25 (8.1 overs)

Northamptonshire Steelbacks won by 57 runs
County Ground, Northampton
Umpires: Dean Daniels and Julia Jarvis

- Northamptonshire Steelbacks won the toss and elected to bat.
- Points: Northamptonshire Steelbacks 5, Sussex Sharks 0

Match 35
17 August 2025
10:30
Scorecard

Worcestershire Rapids; 380/6 (50 overs)	v	Derbyshire Falcons; 210 (46.1 overs)
Clare Boycott 112 (108); Rhiannon Knowling-Davies 2/78 (10 overs)		Megan Pittman 50 (66); Jess Beach 4/23 (10 overs)

Worcestershire Rapids won by 170 runs
Danescourt, Wolverhampton
Umpires: Stephen Fildes and Simon Parbery

- Worcestershire Rapids won the toss and elected to bat.
- Points: Worcestershire Rapids 5, Derbyshire Falcons 0

=== Round 8 ===
Match 36
25 August 2025
10:30
Scorecard

Leicestershire Foxes; 335/4 (50 overs)	v	Derbyshire Falcons; 209 (41.2 overs)
Francesca Sweet 103* (113); Pagan Hardwick 2/43 (9 overs)		Ellie Nightingale 78 (73); Ellen Watson 3/21 (6 overs)

Leicestershire Foxes won by 126 runs
Duffield Cricket Club, Duffield
Umpires: Stephen Fildes and Jane Pratt

- Leicestershire Foxes won the toss and elected to bat.
- Points: Leicestershire Foxes 5, Derbyshire Falcons 0

Match 37
25 August 2025
10:30
Scorecard

Kent; 175 (41 overs)	v	Gloucestershire; 176/4 (37.3 overs)
Elsa Barnfather 42 (67); Charlie Phillips 3/25 (10 overs)		Jess Hazell 70 (72); Izzy James 2/26 (10 overs)

Gloucestershire won by 6 wickets
County Ground, Bristol
Umpires: Dean Daniels and Sharon Grigg

- Kent won the toss and elected to bat.
- Points: Gloucestershire 5, Kent 0

Match 38
25 August 2025
10:30
Scorecard

Yorkshire; 259/9 (50 overs)	v	Northamptonshire Steelbacks; 260/4 (46.3 overs)
Olivia Thomas 57 (92); Bethan Robinson 4/46 (8 overs)		Beth Ascott 86* (91); Jessica Woolston 2/34 (10 overs)

County Ground, Northampton
Umpires: Kelly Alcock and Simon Parbery

- Yorkshire won the toss and elected to bat.
- Points: Northamptonshire Steelbacks 4, Yorkshire 0

Match 39
25 August 2025
10:30
Scorecard

Middlesex; 320/5 (50 overs)	v	Sussex Sharks; 141 (40.5 overs)
Issy Routledge 95 (114); Ava Lee 2/53 (10 overs)		Ava Lee 24 (36); Anaya Patel 3/27 (9 overs)

Middlese won by 179 runs
County Ground, Hove
Umpires: Rehma Chandaria and Julia Jarvis

- Middlesex won the toss and elected to bat.
- Points: Middlesex 5, Sussex Sharks 0

Match 40
25 August 2025
10:30
Scorecard

Worcestershire Rapids; 116 (26.2 overs)	v	Glamorgan; 119/0 (17.3 overs)
Clare Boycott 55* (75); Gemma Porter 3/24 (6.2 overs)		Lauren Parfitt 66* (59)

Glamorgan won by 10 wickets
Astwood Bank, Redditch
Umpires: Amy Coyne and Laura Spragg

- Worcestershire Rapids won the toss and elected to bat.
- Points: Glamorgan 5, Worcestershire Rapids 0

=== Round 9 ===
Match 41
30 August 2025
10:30
Scorecard

Derbyshire Falcons; 186 (44.1 overs)	v	Sussex Sharks; 150/2 (28 overs)
Lara Shaw 57 (76); Lottie Curling 3/17 (6.1 overs)		Daisy Mullan 82* (101); Francesca Clarke 1/44 (8 overs)

Sussex Sharks won by 69 runs (DLS method)
County Ground, Derby
Umpires: Amy Coyne and Adam Hitchcock

- Sussex Sharks won the toss and elected to field.
- Rain prevented any further play.
- Sussex Sharks were 69 ahead of DLS target when play was halted.
- Points: Sussex Sharks 5, Derbyshire Falcons 0

Match 42
30 August 2025
10:30
Scorecard

Northamptonshire Steelbacks; 150/7 (44 overs)	v	Glamorgan
54 (71); 2/18 (10 overs)

No result
Sophia Gardens, Cardiff
Umpires: Rehma Chandaria and Kylie White

- Glamorgan won the toss and elected to field.
- No further play was possible due to rain.
- Points: Glamorgan 2, Northamptonshire Steelbacks 2

Match 43
30 August 2025
10:30
Scorecard

Yorkshire; 404/5 (50 overs)	v	Kent; 125 (34.5 overs)
Lauren Winfield-Hill 194 (126); Megan Belt 1/40 (6 overs)		Megan Sturge 31 (41); Olivia Thomas 3/22 (5 overs)

Yorkshire won by 279 runs
St Lawrence Ground, Canterbury
Umpires: Mel Juniper and Tracey Murphy

- Kent won the toss and elected to field.
- Points: Yorkshire 5, Kent 0

Match 44
30 August 2025
10:30
Scorecard

Leicestershire Foxes; 259/9 (50 overs)	v	Gloucestershire; 166/2 (33 overs)
Francesca Sweet 55 (59); Alice Bird 3/37 (10 overs)		Prarthana Reddy 91* (90); Emma Thatcher 1/20 (7 overs)

Gloucestershire won by 28 runs (DLS method)
Grace Road, Leicester
Umpires: Pam Orton and Mohammed Waseem

- Leicestershire Foxes won the toss and elected to bat.
- Gloucestershire were set a revised target of 252 runs from 48 overs due to rain.
- Gloucestershire were 28 runs ahead in DLS target when play was interrupted by rain.
- Points: Gloucestershire 4, Leicestershire Foxes 0

Match 45
30 August 2025
10:30
Scorecard

Worcestershire Rapids; 177 (48.4 overs)	v	Middlesex; 145/5 (28 overs)
Gwen Davies 69 (93); Sarah Pearson 4/42 (9.4 overs)		Artemis Downer 44 (59); Flora Bertwistle 3/41 (8 overs)

Middlesex won by 40 runs (DLS method)
Merchant Taylors' School Ground, Northwood
Umpires: Laura Spragg and Hemal Wijesuriya

- Worcestershire Rapids won the toss and elected to bat.
- Middlesex were set a revised target of 163 runs from 42 overs.
- Middlesex were 40 runs ahead in DLS target when play was interrupted by rain.
- Points: Middlesex 5, Worcestershire Rapids 0

== Knockout stage ==
=== League Two ===
Semi-final 1
6 September 2025
10:30
Scorecard

Glamorgan; 209 (48.4 overs)	v	Northamptonshire Steelbacks; 148 (41.3 overs)
Bethan Ellis 70 (98); Amelia Kemp 4/34 (9.4 overs)		Beth Ascott 28 (43); Nicole Reid 5/36 (10 overs)

Glamorgan won by 61 runs
Sophia Gardens, Cardiff
Umpires: Rehma Chandaria and Hemal Wijesuriya

- Northamptonshire Steelbacks won the toss and elected to field.

Semi-final 2
6 September 2025
10:30
Scorecard

Middlesex; 194 (47.2 overs)	v	Yorkshire; 195/4 (38.5 overs)
Saskia Horley 83 (100); Ria Fackrell 2/31 (6.2 overs)		Sterre Kalis 65* (79); Saskia Horley 2/37 (8 overs)

Yorkshire won by 6 wickets
Brunton Memorial Ground, Radlett
Umpires: Amy Coyne and Dean Daniels

- Yorkshire won the toss and elected to field.

Final
14 September 2025
10:30
Scorecard

Glamorgan; 127/5 (20 overs)	v	Yorkshire; 128/1 (11.2 overs)
Abigail Freeborn 41 (50); Olivia Thomas 3/14 (4 overs)		Erin Thomas 62* (32); Gemma Porter 1/34 (3.2 overs)

Yorkshire won by 9 wickets
New Road, Worcester
Umpires: Rehma Chandaria and Dean Daniels

- Yorkshire won the toss and elected to field.
- The match was reduced to 20 overs per side due to rain.

=== League One ===
Semi-final 1
16 September 2025
10:30
Scorecard

Lancashire; 241/6 (50 overs)	v	The Blaze; 236/9 (50 overs)
Ailsa Lister 96 (91); Cassidy McCarthy 2/29 (7 overs)		Kathryn Bryce 124 (142); Grace Potts 3/32 (8 overs)

Lancashire won by 5 runs
Trent Bridge, Nottingham
Umpires: Rose Fernando and Sue Redfern

- The Blaze won the toss and elected to field.

Semi-final 2
17 September 2025
10:30
Scorecard

Surrey; 287 (48.5 overs)	v	Hampshire; 290/6 (47.1 overs)
Kira Chathli 81 (76); Freya Davies 4/39 (9.5 overs)		Georgia Adams 107* (101); Kalea Moore 2/43 (10 overs)

Hampshire won by 4 wickets
Rose Bowl, Southampton
Umpires: Gabi Brown and Bob White

- Surrey won the toss and elected to bat.

Final
21 September 2025
10:30
Scorecard

Hampshire; 288/6 (50 overs)	v	Lancashire; 289/4 (48.3 overs)
Georgia Adams 77 (98); Grace Potts 3/47 (9 overs)		Gaby Lewis 141* (143); Freya Davies 1/38 (9.3 overs)

Lancashire won by 6 wickets
Rose Bowl, Southampton
Umpires: Gabi Brown and Surendiran Shanmugam

- Lancashire won the toss and elected to field.

== See also ==
- 2025 One-Day Cup (men's competition)
