= Denton Road =

Cricket ground in Horton, Northamptonshire, England

Coordinates: 52.18262°N 0.80170°W

Ground information
- Location: Horton, Northamptonshire
- Home club: Horton House
- County club: Northamptonshire
- Establishment: 1966 (first recorded match)

Team information
Northamptonshire	(1976-1977)
- As of 1 September 2010; Source: Ground profile

Denton Road, also known as Horton House Cricket Club Ground, is a cricket ground in Horton, Northamptonshire. The first recorded match on the ground was in 1966, when the Northamptonshire Second XI played the Middlesex Second XI. From 1966 to 1984, the ground hosted 20 Second XI Championship matches for the Northamptonshire Second XI.

In 1976, the ground held its first List-A match when Northamptonshire played Essex in the Benson and Hedges Cup. The ground held its second and final List-A match in 1977, which saw Northamptonshire play Minor Counties East in the Benson and Hedges Cup.

In local domestic cricket, the ground is the home venue of Horton House Cricket Club.
