= Abi Norgrove =

English cricketer

Personal information
- Full name: Abigale Emma Molly Norgrove
- Born: 17 January 2006 (age 20); Chipping Norton, Oxfordshire, England
- Batting: Right-handed
- Bowling: Right-arm off break
- Role: Batter

Domestic team information
- Years: Team
- 2019–present: Oxfordshire
- 2023–2024: Southern Vipers

Career statistics
Competition	WLA	WT20
Matches	17	28
Runs scored	315	487
Batting average	22.50	25.63
100s/50s	0/1	0/3
Top score	64	84*
Balls bowled	24	306
Wickets	2	12
Bowling average	6.00	18.33
5 wickets in innings	0	0
10 wickets in match	0	0
Best bowling	2/12	2/6
Catches/stumpings	4/–	6/–
- Source: CricketArchive, 18 October 2024

Abigale Emma Molly Norgrove (born 17 January 2006) is an English cricketer who currently plays for Oxfordshire. She plays as a right-handed batter and right-arm off break bowler.

== Early life ==
Norgrove was born on 17 January 2006 in Chipping Norton, Oxfordshire.

== Domestic career ==
Norgrove made her county debut in 2019, for Oxfordshire against Wiltshire in the Women's County Championship, taking 2/12 from 4 overs. She also played four matches in the 2019 Women's Twenty20 Cup, scoring 30 runs and taking two wickets. She was the side's joint-leading wicket-taker in the 2021 Women's Twenty20 Cup, with five wickets at an average of 13.80, and again took five wickets in the 2022 Women's Twenty20 Cup.

Norgrove was named in the Southern Vipers Academy squad between 2021 and 2023. In August 2022, she scored 136* in a match against Northern Diamonds Academy. She was first named in a matchday squad for the senior team on 1 July 2023, and made her debut for the side the following day, against Sunrisers in the Rachael Heyhoe Flint Trophy. She played five matches overall for the side that season, scoring 83 runs with a high score of 48. In 2024, she played ten matches for Southern Vipers, all in the Rachael Heyhoe Flint Trophy, scoring 205 runs including one half-century.
