= Nancy Harman =

English cricketer (born 1999)

Personal information
- Full name: Nancy Holly Harman
- Born: 11 July 1999 (age 27); Worthing, West Sussex, England
- Batting: Right-handed
- Bowling: Right-arm leg break
- Role: Bowler

Domestic team information
- Years: Team
- 2017–2020: Sussex
- 2020–2021: Lightning
- 2021: Leicestershire
- 2021: Trent Rockets
- 2022–present: Sussex
- 2022–2024: Southern Vipers
- 2022: London Spirit

Career statistics
Competition	WLA	WT20
Matches	33	67
Runs scored	299	499
Batting average	16.61	15.59
100s/50s	0/0	0/0
Top score	49*	43
Balls bowled	705	773
Wickets	28	40
Bowling average	22.25	18.40
5 wickets in innings	1	0
10 wickets in match	0	0
Best bowling	6/40	4/10
Catches/stumpings	8/–	22/–
- Source: CricketArchive, 18 October 2024

Nancy Holly Harman (born 11 July 1999) is an English cricketer who currently plays for Sussex. She plays as a right-arm leg break bowler. She previously played for Leicestershire, Lightning, Southern Vipers, Trent Rockets and London Spirit.

== Early life ==
Harman was born on 11 July 1999 in Worthing, West Sussex. She studies at Loughborough University.

== Domestic career ==
Harman made her county debut in 2017, for Sussex against Nottinghamshire. In 2018, she took 5 wickets at an average of 21.60 to help her side to 2nd in Division 1 of the Twenty20 Cup. The following season, she was her side's leading wicket-taker in the County Championship, taking 14 wickets at an average of 13.42, including her maiden county five-wicket haul, 6/40 against Warwickshire.

In 2021, it was announced that Harman had signed for Leicestershire. She was the leading run-scorer that season for the side in the Twenty20 Cup, with 124 runs, as well as taking 7 wickets at an average of 13.42. In a match against Nottinghamshire, Harman took her T20 best bowling figures, of 4/10. She returned to Sussex ahead of the 2022 season. She took eight wickets for Sussex in the 2022 Women's Twenty20 Cup, at an average of 21.37. She played five matches for the side in the 2023 Women's Twenty20 Cup, taking six wickets at an average of 8.33.

In 2020, Harman played for Lightning in the Rachael Heyhoe Flint Trophy. She appeared in all six matches, scoring 43 runs and taking 2 wickets. She played four matches for the side in 2021, as well as appearing three times for Trent Rockets in The Hundred. Ahead of the 2022 season, it was announced that Harman had joined Southern Vipers. She played seven matches for the side in 2022, across the Charlotte Edwards Cup and the Rachael Heyhoe Flint Trophy, taking four wickets. In The Hundred, she moved to London Spirit, playing one match without batting or bowling. In April 2023, it was announced that Harman had signed her first professional contract with Southern Vipers.

In 2023, she played six matches for Southern Vipers, across the Rachael Heyhoe Flint Trophy and the Charlotte Edwards Cup, taking two wickets. In 2024, she played 13 matches for Southern Vipers, across the Rachael Heyhoe Flint Trophy and the Charlotte Edwards Cup.
