= Jodi Grewcock =

English cricketer (born 2004)

Personal information
- Full name: Jodi Louise Grewcock
- Born: 30 November 2004 (age 21); Leicester, England
- Batting: Left-handed
- Bowling: Right-arm leg break
- Role: All-rounder

International information
- National side: England
- ODI debut (cap 156): 10 May 2026 v New Zealand
- Last ODI: 3 September 2026 v Ireland

Domestic team information
- Years: Team
- 2018–2023: Northamptonshire
- 2022–2024: Sunrisers
- 2025–present: Essex

Career statistics
Competition	WODI	WLA	WT20
Matches	4	33	33
Runs scored	46	653	562
Batting average	11.50	28.39	24.43
100s/50s	0/0	0/5	0/1
Top score	24	76	65
Balls bowled	36	1,139	276
Wickets	1	37	9
Bowling average	26.00	20.86	27.55
5 wickets in innings	0	0	0
10 wickets in match	0	0	0
Best bowling	1/26	4/45	2/11
Catches/stumpings	2/–	11/–	10/–
- Source: CricketArchive, 19 October 2024

Jodi Louise Grewcock (born 30 November 2004) is an English cricketer who currently plays for Essex. She plays as a left-handed batter and right-arm leg break bowler.

== Domestic career ==
Grewcock made her county debut in 2018, for Northamptonshire against Durham in the Women's Twenty20 Cup. She played six matches for the side in 2019, across the County Championship and Twenty20 Cup. After playing four matches in the 2021 Women's Twenty20 Cup, her breakthrough season came in the 2022 Women's Twenty20 Cup, as she was the side's leading run-scorer, with 217 runs from 8 innings. She made her maiden Twenty20 half-century against Leicestershire, scoring 65 in her side's 65 run victory. In the 2023 Women's Twenty20 Cup, she played seven matches, scoring 137 runs and taking two wickets.

Grewcock was included in the Sunrisers Academy squad for 2021. She was again named in the Sunrisers Academy for the 2022 season, but was promoted to the first team squad in May 2022. She made her debut for the side on 11 September 2022, against Lightning in the Rachael Heyhoe Flint Trophy, scoring 35. She played one more match for the side in 2022, scoring 5 runs and taking 2/27 against Central Sparks. In February 2023, it was announced that Grewcock had signed her first professional contract with Sunrisers. On 22 April 2023, she scored her maiden half-century in professional cricket, with 69 against Southern Vipers. She went on to play 11 matches overall for the side that season, all in the Rachael Heyhoe Flint Trophy, scoring two further half-centuries as well as taking 14 wickets at an average of 16.28, the joint-most for the side. In 2024, she played 26 matches for Sunrisers, across the Rachael Heyhoe Flint Trophy and the Charlotte Edwards Cup, scoring two half-centuries and taking 24 wickets, including being the side's joint-leading wicket-taker in the Rachael Heyhoe Flint Trophy.
