= Mary Taylor (cricketer) =

English cricketer (born 2004)

Personal information
- Full name: Mary Louise Latham Taylor
- Born: 7 October 2004 (age 22); Eastbourne, East Sussex, England
- Batting: Right-handed
- Bowling: Right-arm medium
- Role: All-rounder

Domestic team information
- Years: Team
- 2021–2024: Sussex
- 2022–2024: Southern Vipers
- 2023–2024: Southern Brave
- 2025–present: Hampshire
- 2025–present: Birmingham Phoenix

Career statistics
Competition	WLA	WT20
Matches	24	34
Runs scored	66	285
Batting average	11.00	21.92
100s/50s	0/0	0/2
Top score	16	82*
Balls bowled	1,069	537
Wickets	25	24
Bowling average	37.16	21.92
5 wickets in innings	0	0
10 wickets in match	0	0
Best bowling	4/39	3/6
Catches/stumpings	5/–	7/–
- Source: CricketArchive, 18 October 2024

Mary Louise Latham Taylor (born 7 October 2004) is an English cricketer who currently plays for Hampshire and Birmingham Phoenix. Taylor has previously played for Sussex and Southern Brave. She plays as a right-handed batter and right-arm medium bowler.

== Early life ==
Taylor attended Bede's School in Eastbourne alongside her twin sister, Millie, who has also played for Sussex and Birmingham Phoenix, while also representing Warwickshire.

== Domestic career ==
Taylor made her county debut in 2021, for Sussex against Essex, taking 1/6 from her three overs. That season in the Women's Twenty20 Cup, she scored 52 runs and took 5 wickets at an average of 19.00. She played six matches for the side in the 2022 Women's Twenty20 Cup. She was the side's leading run-scorer in the 2023 Women's Twenty20 Cup, with 142 runs in six matches, as well as taking seven wickets at an average of 13.85. She scored 82* from 62 deliveries in a match against Berkshire.

Taylor was named in the Southern Vipers Academy squad for 2021. She was again named in the Academy squad in 2022, and scored 110 for the Vipers 2nd XI against South East Stars 2nd XI in August. She was added to the first team squad in September 2022. She made her debut for Southern Vipers on 21 September 2022, in the Rachael Heyhoe Flint Trophy against South East Stars, taking 2/22 from her five overs. In 2023, she played 17 matches for Southern Vipers, across the Rachael Heyhoe Flint Trophy and the Charlotte Edwards Cup, and took 14 wickets at an average of 35.64 in the Rachael Heyhoe Flint Trophy. She also played two matches for Southern Brave in The Hundred, taking three wickets at an average of 14.33. At the end of the 2023 season, it was announced that she had signed her first professional contract with Southern Vipers. Ahead of the 2025 season, Taylor signed for Hampshire, as well as for Birmingham Phoenix ahead of the 2025 The Hundred season.

== International career ==
In October 2022, Taylor was selected as a non-travelling reserve in the England Under-19 squad for the 2023 ICC Under-19 Women's T20 World Cup.
