= Sophie Mitchelmore =

English cricketer

Personal information
- Full name: Sophie Mitchelmore
- Born: 21 January 2001 (age 25); Banbury, Oxfordshire, England
- Batting: Right-handed
- Bowling: Right-arm medium
- Role: All-rounder

Domestic team information
- Years: Team
- 2016–2019: Oxfordshire
- 2021–present: Hampshire
- 2021: Southern Vipers
- 2023–2024: Southern Vipers

Career statistics
Competition	WLA	WT20
Matches	17	40
Runs scored	344	423
Batting average	31.27	19.22
100s/50s	0/3	0/0
Top score	63*	44
Balls bowled	644	432
Wickets	36	7
Bowling average	9.63	52.71
5 wickets in innings	1	0
10 wickets in match	0	0
Best bowling	5/10	2/13
Catches/stumpings	4/–	5/–
- Source: CricketArchive, 18 October 2024

Sophie Mitchelmore (born 21 January 2001) is an English cricketer who currently plays for Hampshire. An all-rounder, she is a right-handed batter and right-arm medium bowler. She has previously played for Oxfordshire and Southern Vipers.

== Early life ==
Mitchelmore was born on 21 January 2001 in Banbury, Oxfordshire.

== Domestic career ==
Mitchelmore made her county debut in 2016, for Oxfordshire against Cornwall. In 2017, she was Oxfordshire's joint-leading wicket-taker in the County Championship, with 7 wickets including her List A best bowling figures of 5/10, taken against Dorset. She scored her maiden half-century in the 2018 Women's County Championship, as well as ending the season as the fourth-highest wicket-taker across the whole tournament, with 18 wickets at an average of 7.44. In the 2019 Women's County Championship, she was Oxfordshire's second-highest run-scorer and joint-leading wicket-taker, with 135 runs and 9 wickets, as well as making a career-best score of 63* against Wiltshire.

Ahead of the 2021 season, Mitchelmore joined Hampshire. She played 6 matches for the side in the Twenty20 Cup, scoring 76 runs with a best of 43*. In April 2021, Mitchelmore was named in the Southern Vipers Academy squad for the season, and made 78 for the side in a match against the Western Storm Academy on 18 August 2021. On 28 August 2021, Mitchelmore made her debut for the full Southern Vipers side, in a Charlotte Edwards Cup match against South East Stars. She went on to play one further match in the tournament that season. She played one match for Hampshire in the 2022 Women's Twenty20 Cup. Ahead of the 2023 season, she re-joined the Southern Vipers squad, but did not play a match for the side that season. She played six matches for Hampshire in the 2023 Women's Twenty20 Cup, scoring 113 runs and taking one wicket.
