= Megan Sturge =

English cricketer

Personal information
- Full name: Megan Lily Sturge
- Born: 3 November 2004 (age 22); Margate, Kent, England
- Batting: Right-handed
- Bowling: Right-arm off break
- Role: All-rounder, occasional wicket-keeper

Domestic team information
- Years: Team
- 2020–24: Kent
- 2022: South East Stars
- 2023–2024: Southern Vipers
- 2025-present: Hampshire
- 2025: Kent (loan)

Career statistics
Competition	WLA	WT20
Matches	4	16
Runs scored	31	134
Batting average	15.50	14.88
100s/50s	0/0	0/0
Top score	25	45*
Balls bowled	72	70
Wickets	1	4
Bowling average	79.00	16.75
5 wickets in innings	0	0
10 wickets in match	0	0
Best bowling	1/67	2/18
Catches/stumpings	4/0	2/2
- Source: CricketArchive, 19 October 2024

Megan Lily Sturge (born 3 November 2004) is an English cricketer who currently plays for Kent, on loan from Hampshire. She plays as a right-handed batter, right-arm leg spin bowler and occasional wicket-keeper.

== Early life ==
Sturge was born on 3 November 2004 in Kent.

== Domestic career ==
Sturge made her county debut in 2020, for Kent against Essex in the Women's London Championship. She played one match for the side in the 2021 Women's Twenty20 Cup, and four matches in the London Championship, scoring 64 runs at an average of 16.00. She played eight matches for Kent in the 2022 Women's Twenty20 Cup as the side won their regional group, scoring 52 runs. She played two matches in the 2023 Women's Twenty20 Cup.

Sturge was named in the South East Stars Academy for the 2021 season. She was again named in the Academy for the 2022 season, before signing her first contract with the first team squad in July 2022. She did not play for the side that season, however, and moved to the Southern Vipers Academy ahead of the 2023 season. She was first named in a matchday squad for the senior team on 1 July 2023, and made her debut for the side the following day, against Sunrisers in the Rachael Heyhoe Flint Trophy, taking 1/67 from 10 overs. She played two matches overall for the side that season. In 2024, she played one match for Southern Vipers, in the Rachael Heyhoe Flint Trophy.
