= Finty Trussler =

English cricketer

Personal information
- Full name: Finty May Trussler
- Born: 8 May 2003 (age 23); Winchester, Hampshire, England
- Batting: Right-handed
- Bowling: Right arm off-spin
- Role: Batter

Domestic team information
- Years: Team
- 2021–2024: Hampshire
- 2021–2024: Southern Vipers
- 2024-present: Middlesex

Career statistics
Competition	WLA	WT20
Matches	6	27
Runs scored	175	381
Batting average	43.75	19.05
100s/50s	0/2	0/0
Top score	62	49
Balls bowled	170	426
Wickets	6	31
Bowling average	21.50	10.64
5 wickets in innings	0	0
10 wickets in match	0	0
Best bowling	2/12	4/12
Catches/stumpings	0/–	9/–
- Source: CricketArchive, 18 October 2024

Finty May Trussler (born 8 May 2003) is an English cricketer who currently plays for Middlesex. She plays as a right-handed batter.

== Domestic career ==
Trussler made her county debut in 2021, for Hampshire against Middlesex in the Women's Twenty20 Cup. She went on to be the leading wicket-taker across the whole tournament, taking 16 wickets in her 6 matches at an average of 6.50. In her third match of the tournament, she took her Twenty20 best bowling figures, of 4/12 against Sussex. She played three matches in the 2022 Women's Twenty20 Cup, taking one wicket. She joined Oxfordshire for the South Central Counties Cup, a 50-over tournament involving the counties in the South of England. She took 2/15 from her 7 overs in the opening match of the tournament. She played eight matches for Hampshire in the 2023 Women's Twenty20 Cup, scoring 111 runs and taking 10 wickets at an average of 8.70.

Trussler was named in the Southern Vipers squad for the 2021 season, but did not play a match. She was not initially named in the side's squad for the 2022 season, but was first named in a matchday squad for the Vipers' match against Lightning on 16 July. She made her debut for the side on 17 September 2022, against Northern Diamonds in the Rachael Heyhoe Flint Trophy, taking 2/56 from her 10 overs. She played one more match for Vipers that season, against South East Stars in the Rachael Heyhoe Flint Trophy play-off, taking 2/12 from her 6.2 overs. She was again in the Southern Vipers squad for the 2023 and 2024 seasons, but did not play a match.

Trussler was released by the Vipers when her contract expired at the end of the 2024 season and joined Middlesex the following year.
