= Ava Lee =

English cricketer

Personal information
- Full name: Ava Georgina Lee
- Born: 26 August 2005 (age 21)
- Batting: Right-handed
- Bowling: Right-arm off break
- Role: Bowler

Domestic team information
- Years: Team
- 2022–present: Berkshire
- 2023–2024: Southern Vipers

Career statistics
Competition	WLA	WT20
Matches	16	13
Runs scored	40	38
Batting average	6.66	–
100s/50s	0/0	0/0
Top score	14*	11*
Balls bowled	811	156
Wickets	23	11
Bowling average	26.21	16.00
5 wickets in innings	0	0
10 wickets in match	0	0
Best bowling	4/51	3/15
Catches/stumpings	6/–	2/–
- Source: CricketArchive, 18 October 2024

Ava Georgina Lee (born 26 August 2005) is an English cricketer who currently plays for Berkshire. She plays as a right-arm off break bowler.

== Domestic career ==
Lee made her county debut in 2022, for Berkshire against Shropshire. She went on to play seven matches overall in the 2022 Women's Twenty20 Cup, taking two wickets. She played three matches in the 2023 Women's Twenty20 Cup, taking four wickets at an average of 16.50.

Lee was named in the Southern Vipers Academy squad in 2022 and 2023. In June 2023, she took 5/35 in a Second XI match for Vipers against South East Stars. She was first named in a matchday squad for the senior team on 1 July 2023, and made her debut for the side the following day, against Sunrisers in the Rachael Heyhoe Flint Trophy, taking 2/43 from 10 overs. She played eight matches overall for the side that season, taking 10 wickets at an average of 30.10. In 2024, she played eight matches for Southern Vipers, across the Rachael Heyhoe Flint Trophy and the Charlotte Edwards Cup, taking 11 wickets with a best bowling of 4/51.
