= Alice Monaghan =

English cricketer (born 2000)

Personal information
- Full name: Alice Zoe Monaghan
- Born: 20 March 2000 (age 26); Basingstoke, Hampshire, England
- Batting: Right-handed
- Bowling: Right-arm medium
- Role: All-rounder

Domestic team information
- Years: Team
- 2016–2024: Hampshire
- 2018: Yorkshire Diamonds
- 2019: Loughborough Lightning
- 2020–2024: Southern Vipers
- 2021–2024: London Spirit
- 2022: Oxfordshire
- 2024–present: Manchester Originals
- 2025–present: Surrey

Career statistics
Competition	WLA	WT20
Matches	50	77
Runs scored	275	394
Batting average	11.95	10.36
100s/50s	0/0	0/0
Top score	43*	44*
Balls bowled	641	470
Wickets	15	19
Bowling average	36.46	27.26
5 wickets in innings	0	0
10 wickets in match	0	0
Best bowling	4/22	2/7
Catches/stumpings	20/–	22/–
- Source: CricketArchive, 18 October 2024

Alice Zoe Monaghan (born 20 March 2000) is an English cricketer who currently plays for Surrey and Manchester Originals. An all-rounder, she is a right-handed batter and right-arm medium bowler. She has previously played for Oxfordshire, Hampshire, Yorkshire Diamonds, Loughborough Lightning, Southern Vipers and London Spirit.

== Early life ==
Monaghan was born on 20 March 2000 in Basingstoke, Hampshire.

== Domestic career ==
Monaghan made her county debut in 2016, for Hampshire against Somerset in a Twenty20 Cup match. In her first County Championship match that same season, she hit what remains her List A high score, of 43*. She was part of the Hampshire side that gained promotion from Division 2 of the County Championship in 2017, and subsequently won Division 1 the following season in 2018. In 2017 she also took her best List A bowling figures, of 4/22 against Staffordshire. She played six matches for the side in the 2021 Women's Twenty20 Cup, scoring 42 runs and taking two wickets. She was ever-present in the 2022 Women's Twenty20 Cup, scoring 76 runs and taking four wickets. She joined Oxfordshire for the South Central Counties Cup, a 50-over tournament involving the counties in the South of England. She top-scored for Oxfordshire with 44 from 44 deliveries in the opening round of the tournament. She played six matches for Hampshire in the 2023 Women's Twenty20 Cup, taking four wickets.

Monaghan also played for Yorkshire Diamonds in the 2018 Women's Cricket Super League, appearing in four matches. In 2019 she was part of the Loughborough Lightning squad, but did not play a match.

In 2020, Monaghan played for Southern Vipers in the Rachael Heyhoe Flint Trophy. She appeared in all 7 matches as her side won the competition, scoring 11 runs and bowling 4 overs. She played seven times for the side in 2021, across the Rachael Heyhoe Flint Trophy and the Charlotte Edwards Cup, scoring 35 runs and taking one wicket. She also played for London Spirit in The Hundred, appearing in six matches. Monaghan missed her university graduation to be at London Spirit's match against Northern Superchargers at Lord's, so the team instead celebrated together on the dressing room balcony after the match. She played three matches for Southern Vipers in 2022, all in the Rachael Heyhoe Flint Trophy. She also played six matches for London Spirit in The Hundred. In April 2023, it was announced that Monaghan had signed her first professional contract with Southern Vipers.

In 2023, she played 17 matches for Southern Vipers, across the Rachael Heyhoe Flint Trophy and the Charlotte Edwards Cup, taking 8 wickets. She also played two matches for London Spirit in The Hundred. In 2024, she played 14 matches for Southern Vipers, across the Rachael Heyhoe Flint Trophy and the Charlotte Edwards Cup.
