= Ella McCaughan =

English cricketer (born 2002)

Personal information
- Full name: Ella May McCaughan
- Born: 26 September 2002 (age 24); Southampton, England
- Batting: Right-handed
- Bowling: Right-arm leg break
- Role: Batter

Domestic team information
- Years: Team
- 2018–present: Sussex
- 2020–2024: Southern Vipers
- 2021–2022: Southern Brave
- 2023–2024: Welsh Fire
- 2025: Manchester Originals

Career statistics
Competition	WLA	WT20
Matches	60	56
Runs scored	1,218	666
Batting average	22.55	18.00
100s/50s	0/6	0/1
Top score	83	52*
Balls bowled	–	52
Wickets	–	4
Bowling average	–	15.75
5 wickets in innings	–	0
10 wickets in match	–	0
Best bowling	–	3/6
Catches/stumpings	16/–	11/–
- Source: CricketArchive, 18 October 2024

Ella May McCaughan (born 26 September 2002) is an English cricketer who currently plays for Sussex and Welsh Fire. She plays as a right-handed batter.

== Early life ==
McCaughan was born on 26 September 2002 in Southampton. She attended Seaford Head School.

== Domestic career ==
McCaughan made her county debut in 2018, for Sussex against Surrey. She played four matches in the County Championship as her side won Division 2 and were promoted. In 2019, she was Sussex's joint-second leading run-scorer, with 135 runs, in the County Championship, helping her side to third place. She scored 96 runs for the side in the 2021 Women's Twenty20 Cup, including her Twenty20 high score of 40*. In the 2022 Women's Twenty20 Cup, McCaughan was Sussex's leading run-scorer, scoring 189 runs, including her maiden Twenty20 half-century, scoring 52* against Kent. She also took four wickets for the side, including 3/6 against Hampshire. She played four matches for the side in the 2023 Women's Twenty20 Cup.

In 2020, McCaughan played for Southern Vipers in the Rachael Heyhoe Flint Trophy. She appeared in all seven matches as her side won the tournament, scoring 172 runs at an average of 28.66. She hit her first two half-centuries, scoring 50 against South East Stars and 63 against Western Storm, as well as scoring 35 in the final against Northern Diamonds. McCaughan played ten matches for the side in 2021, with a top score of 41, as the side defended the Rachael Heyhoe Flint Trophy. She was also in the Southern Brave squad for The Hundred, but did not play a match. She played 13 matches for Southern Vipers in 2022, across the Charlotte Edwards Cup and the Rachael Heyhoe Flint Trophy, scoring 227 runs. She made her List A high score against Lightning, making 72. She was also again in the Southern Brave squad for The Hundred, but did not play a match. At the end of the 2022 season, it was announced that McCaughan had signed her first professional contract with Southern Vipers.

In 2023, she played 20 matches for Southern Vipers, across the Rachael Heyhoe Flint Trophy and the Charlotte Edwards Cup, including scoring two half-centuries in the Rachael Heyhoe Flint Trophy. She also played two matches for Welsh Fire in The Hundred. In 2024, she played 16 matches for Southern Vipers, across the Rachael Heyhoe Flint Trophy and the Charlotte Edwards Cup, scoring one half-century.
