= 2022 Oval Invincibles season =

Oval Invincibles
2022 season
- Coach: (Australia) Tom Moody (Men's team) (England) Jonathan Batty (Women's team)
- Captain: (England) Sam Billings (Men's team) (South Africa) Dane van Niekerk (Women's team)
- Overseas player: (Australia) Hilton Cartwright (Cricket West Indies) Carlos Brathwaite (Australia) Peter Hatzoglou (Pakistan) Mohammad Hasnain (Cricket West Indies) Sunil Narine (South Africa) Rilee Rossouw (Men's team) (South Africa) Shabnim Ismail (South Africa) Marizanne Kapp (South Africa) Dane van Niekerk (New Zealand) Suzie Bates (Women's team)
- Ground(s): The Oval
- The Hundred (Men's): 5th
- The Hundred (Women's): Winners
- Most runs: Will Jacks: 261 (Men's team); Suzie Bates: 232 (Women's team)
- Most wickets: Sunil Narine: 11 (Men's team); Alice Capsey, Sophia Smale & Eva Gray: 8 (Women's team)

The 2022 season was the Oval Invincibles' second season of the 100-ball cricket tournament, The Hundred. The women's team were the reigning champions from the 2021 season, and proved to be the best team in the women's format once again, beating Southern Brave in the final for the second successive season, winning their second tournament.

== Players ==
=== Men's side ===
The Invincibles men’s squad retained ten players from the previous season:

- Sam Curran (central contract)
- Rory Burns (central contract)
- West Indian all-rounder Sunil Narine (£125K)
- Jason Roy (£125k)
- Tom Curran (£100k)
- Sam Billings (£100k)
- Saqib Mahmood (£75k)
- Will Jacks (£75k)
- Jordan Cox (£30k)
- Nathan Sowter (£30k)

They drafted:

- South African top order batter Rilee Rossouw (£60K)
- Slow left arm bowler Danny Briggs (£50K)
- Australian all-rounder Hilton Cartwright (£50K)
- English middle-order batter Jack Leaning (£40K)
- English fast bowler Matt Milnes (£40K)

Each franchise was allowed one wildcard pick. The Invincibles selected Jack Haynes.

=== Men's side ===
- **Bold** denotes players with international caps.

| S/N | Name | Nat. | Date of birth (age) | Batting style | Bowling style | Notes |
Batters
| 9 | Will Jacks | (England) | 21 November 1998 (age 27) | Right-handed | Right-arm off break | |
| 11 | **Rilee Rossouw** | (South Africa) | 9 October 1989 (age 36) | Left-handed | Right-arm off break | Overseas player |
| 17 | **Rory Burns** | (England) | 26 August 1990 (age 35) | Left-handed | Right-arm medium | Centrally Contracted player; Ruled out |
| 20 | **Jason Roy** | (England) | 21 July 1990 (age 35) | Right-handed | Right-arm medium | |
| 22 | Jordan Cox | (England) | 21 October 2000 (age 25) | Right-handed | — | |
| 30 | Jack Haynes | (England) | 30 January 2001 (age 24) | Right-handed | Right-arm off break | Wildcard player |
| 34 | Jack Leaning | (England) | 18 October 1993 (age 32) | Right-handed | Right-arm off break | |
| 35 | **Hilton Cartwright** | (Australia) | 14 February 1992 (age 33) | Right-handed | Right-arm medium | Overseas player |
All Rounders
| 26 | **Carlos Brathwaite** | (Cricket West Indies) | 18 July 1988 (age 37) | Right-handed | Right-arm fast-medium | Overseas player; Replacement player |
| 58 | **Sam Curran** | (England) | 3 June 1998 (age 27) | Left-handed | Left-arm fast-medium | Centrally Contracted player |
| 59 | **Tom Curran** | (England) | 12 March 1995 (age 30) | Right-handed | Right-arm fast-medium | |
| 74 | **Sunil Narine** | (Cricket West Indies) | 26 May 1988 (age 37) | Left-handed | Right-arm off break | Overseas player; Ruled out |
Wicketkeepers
| 7 | **Sam Billings** | (England) | 15 June 1991 (age 34) | Right-handed | — | Captain |
Pace bowlers
| 8 | **Saqib Mahmood** | (England) | 25 February 1997 (age 28) | Right-handed | Right-arm fast-medium | Ruled out through injury |
| 8 | Matt Milnes | (England) | 29 July 1994 (age 31) | Right-handed | Right-arm fast-medium | |
| 23 | **Reece Topley** | (England) | 21 February 1994 (age 31) | Right-handed | Left-arm fast-medium | Ruled out |
| 36 | **Pat Brown** | (England) | 23 August 1998 (age 27) | Right-handed | Right-arm fast-medium | Replacement player |
| 37 | Gus Atkinson | (England) | 19 January 1998 (age 27) | Right-handed | Right-arm fast-medium | Replacement player; Ruled out through injury |
| 87 | **Mohammad Hasnain** | (Pakistan) | 5 April 2000 (age 25) | Right-handed | Right-arm fast | Overseas player; Ruled out |
Spin bowlers
| 2 | Peter Hatzoglou | (Australia) | 27 November 1998 (age 27) | Right-handed | Right-arm leg break | Overseas player; Replacement player |
| 19 | **Danny Briggs** | (England) | 30 April 1991 (age 34) | Right-handed | Slow left-arm orthodox | |
| 72 | Nathan Sowter | (England) | 12 October 1992 (age 33) | Right-handed | Right-arm leg break | |

=== Women's side ===
- **Bold** denotes players with international caps.

| S/N | Name | Nat. | Date of birth (age) | Batting style | Bowling style | Notes |
Batters
| 4 | Emily Windsor | (England) | 14 September 1997 (age 28) | Right-handed | Right-arm medium | |
| 14 | Kirstie White | (England) | 14 March 1988 (age 37) | Right-handed | Right-arm medium | Replacement player |
| 28 | Aylish Cranstone | (England) | 28 August 1994 (age 31) | Left-handed | Left-arm medium | |
All Rounders
| 11 | **Suzie Bates** | (New Zealand) | 16 September 1987 (age 38) | Right-handed | Right-arm medium | Overseas player |
| 16 | Sophia Smale | (Wales) | 8 December 2004 (age 21) | Right-handed | Slow left-arm orthodox | Replacement player |
| 26 | **Alice Capsey** | (England) | 11 August 2004 (age 21) | Right-handed | Right-arm off break | |
| 29 | Ryana MacDonald-Gay | (England) | 12 February 2004 (age 21) | Right-handed | Right-arm medium | |
| 81 | **Dane van Niekerk** | (South Africa) | 14 May 1993 (age 32) | Right-handed | Right-arm leg break | Captain; Overseas player |
Wicketkeepers
| 20 | Kira Chathli | (England) | 29 July 1999 (age 26) | Right-handed | — | |
| 58 | **Lauren Winfield-Hill** | (England) | 16 August 1990 (age 35) | Right-handed | — | |
Pace bowlers
| 7 | **Marizanne Kapp** | (South Africa) | 4 January 1990 (age 36) | Right-handed | Right-arm medium | Overseas player |
| 18 | Eva Gray | (England) | 24 May 2000 (age 25) | Right-handed | Right-arm medium | |
| 53 | **Tash Farrant** | (England) | 29 May 1996 (age 29) | Left-handed | Left-arm fast-medium | Ruled out through injury |
| 61 | Grace Gibbs | (England) | 1 May 1995 (age 30) | Right-handed | Right-arm medium | |
| 88 | Emma Jones | (England) | 8 August 2002 (age 23) | Right-handed | Right-arm medium | Ruled out through injury |
| 89 | **Shabnim Ismail** | (South Africa) | 5 October 1988 (age 37) | Left-handed | Right-arm fast-medium | Overseas player |
Spin bowlers
| 19 | Danielle Gregory | (England) | 4 December 1998 (age 27) | Right-handed | Right-arm leg break | |
| 22 | **Mady Villiers** | (England) | 26 August 1998 (age 27) | Right-handed | Right-arm off break | |

== League stage ==
=== Men's results ===
4 August 2022
18:30 (N)
Scorecard

| London Spirit; 171/6 (100 balls) | v | Oval Invincibles (H); 168/7 (100 balls) |
| Eoin Morgan 47 (29); Sunil Narine 2/25 (20 balls) | | Hilton Cartwright 42 (23); Nathan Ellis 3/28 (20 balls) |

London Spirit won by 3 runs
The Oval, London
Umpires: Nick Cook (Eng) and David Millns (Eng)
Player of the match: Nathan Ellis (London Spirit)

- Oval Invincibles won the toss and elected to field.
- Points: London Spirit 2, Oval Invincibles 0.

7 August 2022
14:00
Scorecard

| Oval Invincibles; 158/5 (100 balls) | v | Welsh Fire (H); 119/6 (100 balls) |
| Will Jacks 81 (45); Ryan Higgins 2/31 (20 balls) | | Joe Clarke 37 (29); Sunil Narine 3/21 (20 balls) |

Oval Invincibles won by 39 runs
Sophia Gardens, Cardiff
Umpires: Nigel Llong (Eng) and Alex Wharf (Eng)
Player of the match: Will Jacks (Oval Invincibles)

- Welsh Fire won the toss and elected to field.
- Points: Oval Invincibles 2, Welsh Fire 0.

11 August 2022
15:00
Scorecard

| Northern Superchargers; 157/7 (100 balls) | v | Oval Invincibles (H); 158/7 (97 balls) |
| Adam Lyth 79 (33); Sunil Narine 3/11 (20 balls) | | Sam Curran 60 (39); Dwayne Bravo 2/29 (20 balls) |

Oval Invincibles won by 3 wickets
The Oval, London
Umpires: Rob Bailey (Eng) and Alex Wharf (Eng)
Player of the match: Sam Curran (Oval Invincibles)

- Oval Invincibles won the toss and elected to field.
- Points: Oval Invincibles 2, Northern Superchargers 0.

14 August 2022
18:00 (N)
Scorecard

| Southern Brave; 137/6 (100 balls) | v | Oval Invincibles (H); 142/3 (82 balls) |
| Marcus Stoinis 37 (27); Reece Topley 3/24 (20 balls) | | Will Jacks 108* (48); James Fuller 1/22 (20 balls) |

Oval Invincibles won by 7 wickets
The Oval, London
Umpires: David Millns (Eng) and Alex Wharf (Eng)
Player of the match: Will Jacks (Oval Invincibles)

- Oval Invincibles won the toss and elected to field.
- Points: Oval Invincibles 2, Southern Brave 0.

17 August 2022
19:00 (N)
Scorecard

| (H) Trent Rockets; 181/4 (100 balls) | v | Oval Invincibles; 156/5 (100 balls) |
| Alex Hales 59 (29); Mohammad Hasnain 2/28 (15 balls) | | Jordan Cox 61* (33); Tabraiz Shamsi 2/21 (20 balls) |

Trent Rockets won by 25 runs
Trent Bridge, Nottingham
Umpires: Richard Kettleborough (Eng) and Neil Mallender (Eng)
Player of the match: Alex Hales (Trent Rockets)

- Oval Invincibles won the toss and elected to field.
- Points: Trent Rockets 2, Oval Invincibles 0.

23 August 2022
18:30 (N)
Scorecard

| Birmingham Phoenix; 166/6 (100 balls) | v | Oval Invincibles (H); 156/8 (100 balls) |
| Liam Livingstone 45 (32); Matt Milnes 3/32 (20 balls) | | Jordan Cox 32 (29); Tom Helm 3/11 (20 balls) |

Birmingham Phoenix won by 10 runs
The Oval, London
Umpires: James Middlebrook (Eng) and Martin Saggers (Eng)
Player of the match: Kane Richardson (Birmingham Phoenix)

- Oval Invincibles won the toss and elected to field.
- Points: Birmingham Phoenix 2, Oval Invincibles 0.

27 August 2022
19:00 (N)
Scorecard

| (H) London Spirit; 122/7 (100 balls) | v | Oval Invincibles; 124/4 (86 overs) |
| Adam Rossington 36 (22); Sam Curran 3/16 (20 balls) | | Will Jacks 54 (38); Jordan Thompson 2/22 (16 balls) |

Oval Invincibles won by 6 wickets
Lord's, London
Umpires: Richard Kettleborough (Eng) and Nigel Llong (Eng)
Player of the match: Sam Curran (Oval Invincibles)

- London Spirit won the toss and elected to bat.
- Points: Oval Invincibles 2, London Spirit 0.

31 August 2022
18:30 (N)
Scorecard

| Oval Invincibles; 143/9 (100 balls) | v | Manchester Originals (H); 144/4 (99 balls) |
| Sam Billings 53 (33); Josh Little 5/13 (20 balls) | | Wayne Madsen 53* (39); Danny Briggs 2/22 (20 balls) |

Manchester Originals won by 6 wickets
Old Trafford, Manchester
Umpires: Nigel Llong (Eng) and Alex Wharf (Eng)
Player of the match: Josh Little (Manchester Originals)

- Oval Invincibles won the toss and elected to bat.
- Points: Manchester Originals 2, Oval Invincibles 0.

=== Women's results ===
Due to the shortened women's competition, Oval Invincibles didn't play against Welsh Fire.

11 August 2022
18:30 (N)
Scorecard

| Northern Superchargers; 143/5 (100 balls) | v | Oval Invincibles (H); 146/1 (84 balls) |
| Jemimah Rodrigues 51 (32); Ryana MacDonald-Gay 2/25 (15 balls) | | Lauren Winfield-Hill 74* (42); Jenny Gunn 1/22 (15 balls) |

Oval Invincibles won by 9 wickets
The Oval, London
Umpires: Sarah Bartlett (Eng) and Rob White (Eng)
Player of the match: Lauren Winfield-Hill (Oval Invincibles)

- Oval Invincibles won the toss and elected to field.
- Points: Oval Invincibles 2, Northern Superchargers 0.

14 August 2022
14:30
Scorecard

| Southern Brave; 153/7 (100 balls) | v | Oval Invincibles (H); 141/7 (100 balls) |
| Smriti Mandhana 46 (25); Sophia Smale 2/12 (20 balls) | | Lauren Winfield-Hill 25 (19); Danni Wyatt 2/16 (10 balls) |

Southern Brave won by 12 runs
The Oval, London
Umpires: Sarah Bartlett (Eng) and Ben Debenham (Eng)
Player of the match: Georgia Adams (Southern Brave)

- Oval Invincibles won the toss and elected to field.
- Points: Southern Brave 2, Oval Invincibles 0.

17 August 2022
15:30
Scorecard

| (H) Trent Rockets; 112/8 (100 balls) | v | Oval Invincibles; 115/5 (99 balls) |
| Nat Sciver 59* (48); Eva Gray 2/16 (20 balls) | | Suzie Bates 41 (32); Bryony Smith 3/21 (19 balls) |

Oval Invincibles won by 5 wickets
Trent Bridge, Nottingham
Umpires: James Middlebrook (Eng) and Sue Redfern (Eng)
Player of the match: Suzie Bates (Oval Invincibles)

- Oval Invincibles won the toss and elected to field.
- Points: Oval Invincibles 2, Trent Rockets 0.

23 August 2022
15:00
Scorecard

| Birmingham Phoenix; 106/7 (100 balls) | v | Oval Invincibles (H); 107/2 (87 balls) |
| Evelyn Jones 29 (29); Alice Capsey 3/15 (20 balls) | | Lauren Winfield-Hill 41* (38); Emily Arlott 1/8 (17 balls) |

Oval Invincibles won by 8 wickets
The Oval, London
Umpires: Paul Baldwin (Eng) and Sarah Bartlett (Eng)
Player of the match: Alice Capsey (Oval Invincibles)

- Oval Invincibles won the toss and elected to field.
- Points: Oval Invincibles 2, Birmingham Phoenix 0.

27 August 2022
15:30
Scorecard

| (H) London Spirit; 80 (97 balls) | v | Oval Invincibles; 82/1 (58 balls) |
| Amelia Kerr 31 (31); Mady Villiers 4/12 (20 balls) | | Lauren Winfield-Hill 44* (28); Grace Scrivens 1/23 (18 balls) |

Oval Invincibles won by 9 wickets
Lord's, London
Umpires: James Middlebrook (Eng) and Sue Redfern (Eng)
Player of the match: Mady Villiers (Oval Invincibles)

- Oval Invincibles won the toss and elected to field.
- Points: Oval Invincibles 2, London Spirit 0.

31 August 2022
15:00
Scorecard

| Oval Invincibles; 163/2 (100 balls) | v | Manchester Originals (H); 131/6 (100 balls) |
| Suzie Bates 79* (47); Sophie Ecclestone 1/27 (20 balls) | | Lizelle Lee 64 (41); Marizanne Kapp 2/14 (15 balls) |

Oval Invincibles won by 32 runs
Old Trafford, Manchester
Umpires: Sophie McLelland (Eng) and Paul Pollard (Eng)
Player of the match: Suzie Bates (Oval Invincibles)

- Oval Invincibles won the toss and elected to bat.
- Points: Oval Invincibles 2, Manchester Originals 0.

== Standings ==
=== Men ===
| Pos | Team | Pld | W | L | T | NR | Pts | NRR |
|---|---|---|---|---|---|---|---|---|
| 1 | Trent Rockets (C) | 8 | 6 | 2 | 0 | 0 | 12 | 0.576 |
| 2 | Manchester Originals | 8 | 5 | 3 | 0 | 0 | 10 | 0.908 |
| 3 | London Spirit | 8 | 5 | 3 | 0 | 0 | 10 | 0.338 |
| 4 | Birmingham Phoenix | 8 | 5 | 3 | 0 | 0 | 10 | −0.172 |
| 5 | Oval Invincibles | 8 | 4 | 4 | 0 | 0 | 8 | 0.385 |
| 6 | Northern Superchargers | 8 | 4 | 4 | 0 | 0 | 8 | 0.009 |
| 7 | Southern Brave | 8 | 3 | 5 | 0 | 0 | 6 | −0.593 |
| 8 | Welsh Fire | 8 | 0 | 8 | 0 | 0 | 0 | −1.442 |

Source: BBC Sport, ESPN Cricinfo
(C) Champions

advanced to Final
advanced to the Eliminator

=== Women ===
| Pos | Team | Pld | W | L | T | NR | Pts | NRR |
|---|---|---|---|---|---|---|---|---|
| 1 | Oval Invincibles (C) | 6 | 5 | 1 | 0 | 0 | 10 | 1.098 |
| 2 | Southern Brave | 6 | 5 | 1 | 0 | 0 | 10 | 0.806 |
| 3 | Trent Rockets | 6 | 3 | 3 | 0 | 0 | 6 | 0.101 |
| 4 | Birmingham Phoenix | 6 | 3 | 3 | 0 | 0 | 6 | −0.031 |
| 5 | Northern Superchargers | 6 | 3 | 3 | 0 | 0 | 6 | −0.119 |
| 6 | Manchester Originals | 6 | 2 | 4 | 0 | 0 | 4 | −0.478 |
| 7 | London Spirit | 6 | 2 | 4 | 0 | 0 | 4 | −0.557 |
| 8 | Welsh Fire | 6 | 1 | 5 | 0 | 0 | 2 | −0.681 |

Source: BBC Sport, ESPN Cricinfo
(C) Champions

advanced to Final
advanced to the Eliminator

== Knockout stages ==
=== Women ===
==== Final ====
3 September 2022
15:00
Scorecard

| Southern Brave; 101/7 (100 balls) | v | Oval Invincibles; 105/5 (94 balls) |
| Sophia Dunkley 26 (23); Shabnim Ismail 2/12 (20 balls) | | Marizanne Kapp 37* (33); Amanda-Jade Wellington 2/25 (20 balls) |

Oval Invincibles won by 5 wickets
Lord's, London
Umpires: Ben Debenham (Eng) and Sue Redfern (Eng)
Player of the match: Marizanne Kapp (Oval Invincibles)

- Southern Brave won the toss and elected to bat.
