= 2023 Oval Invincibles season =

English cricket club season

Oval Invincibles
2023 season
- Coach: (Australia) Tom Moody (Men's team) (England) Jonathan Batty (Women's team)
- Captain: (England) Sam Billings (Men's team) (South Africa) Dane van Niekerk (Women's team)
- Overseas player: (South Africa) Heinrich Klaasen (Republic of Ireland) Paul Stirling (Cricket West Indies) Sunil Narine (New Zealand) Jimmy Neesham (Australia) Spencer Johnson (Australia) Adam Zampa (Men's team) (South Africa) Shabnim Ismail (South Africa) Marizanne Kapp (South Africa) Dane van Niekerk (New Zealand) Suzie Bates (South Africa) Nadine de Klerk (Women's team)
- Ground(s): The Oval
- The Hundred (Men's): Winners
- The Hundred (Women's): 5th
- Most runs: Will Jacks: 227 (Men's team); Marizanne Kapp: 147 (Women's team)
- Most wickets: Nathan Sowter: 9 (Men's team); Marizanne Kapp: 11 (Women's team)

The 2023 season was the Oval Invincibles' third season of the 100-ball cricket cricket tournament, The Hundred. The women's team were denied the chance of a three-peat, going out in the group stage after winning the first two editions of the tournament. The men's side fared better, winning the trophy for the first time.

== Players ==
=== Men's side ===
The Invincibles men’s squad retained eleven players from the previous season:

- Sam Curran (central contract)
- Sunil Narine (£125k)
- Will Jacks (£125k)
- Jason Roy (£100k)
- Tom Curran (£100k)
- Sam Billings (£75k)
- Saqib Mahmood (£75k)
- Jordan Cox (£50k)
- Gus Atkinson (£50k)
- Danny Briggs (£40k)
- Nathan Sowter (£30k)

They drafted:

- South African right-hander Heinrich Klaasen (£60k)
- English middle order batter Ross Whiteley (£60k)
- Pakistan pace bowler Ihsanullah (£40k)

For the 2023 tournament, the number of wildcard picks each team could make was raised to two. The Invincibles selected Tawanda Muyeye and Zak Chappell.

There were several changes to overseas players due to international commitments and injuries:

- Ihsanullah withdrew before the tournament began. He was replaced by Spencer Johnson
- Sunil Narine was available only until August 13, when he was replaced by Adam Zampa
- Heinrich Klaasen could only play until August 19, when he was replaced by Jimmy Neesham
- Irish star Paul Stirling was drafted in for the final, as all overseas players except Neesham were unavailable to play.

• Bold denotes players with international caps.

S/N	Name	Nat.	Date of birth (age)	Batting style	Bowling style	Notes
Batters
9	**Will Jacks**	(England)	21 November 1998 (age 27)	Right-handed	Right-arm off break	
20	**Jason Roy**	(England)	21 July 1990 (age 36)	Right-handed	Right-arm medium	
22	Jordan Cox	(England)	21 October 2000 (age 25)	Right-handed	—	Ruled out.
27	Graham Clark	(England)	16 March 1993 (age 33)	Right-handed	Right-arm leg break	Replacement player.
14	Tawanda Muyeye	(England)	5 March 2001 (age 25)	Right-handed		
45	**Heinrich Klaasen**	(South Africa)	30 July 1991 (age 35)	Right-handed	—	Overseas player until 19 August.
39	**Paul Stirling**	(Republic of Ireland)	3 September 1990 (age 35)	Right-handed	Right-arm off break	Overseas player 27 August.
All Rounders
58	**Sam Curran**	(England)	3 June 1998 (age 28)	Left-handed	Left-arm fast-medium	England international.
59	**Tom Curran**	(England)	12 March 1995 (age 31)	Right-handed	Right-arm fast-medium	
74	**Sunil Narine**	(Cricket West Indies)	26 May 1988 (age 38)	Left-handed	Right-arm off break	Overseas player until 13 August.
5	**Jimmy Neesham**	(New Zealand)	17 September 1990 (age 35)	Right-handed	Right-arm fast-medium	Overseas player from 20 August; replacement player.
30	Tom Lawes	(England)	25 December 2002 (age 23)	Right-handed	Right-arm fast-medium	
Wicketkeepers
7	**Sam Billings**	(England)	15 June 1991 (age 35)	Right-handed	—	
Pace bowlers
25	**Saqib Mahmood**	England	25 February 1997 (age 29)	Right-handed	Right-arm fast-medium	Ruled out.
37	**Gus Atkinson**	(England)	19 January 1998 (age 28)	Right-handed	Right-arm fast-medium	
23	**Spencer Johnson**	(Australia)	16 December 1995 (age 30)	Left-handed	Left-arm fast	Overseas player from 9 August until 21 August.
32	Zak Chappell	(England)	21 August 1996 (age 29)	Right-handed	Right-arm fast-medium	
Spin bowlers
88	**Adam Zampa**	(Australia)	31 March 1992 (age 34)	Right-handed	Right-arm leg break	Overseas player; replacement player from 14 August until 21 August.
19	**Danny Briggs**	(England)	30 April 1991 (age 35)	Right-handed	Slow left-arm orthodox	
72	Nathan Sowter	(England)	12 October 1992 (age 33)	Right-handed	Right-arm leg break	
44	Ross Whiteley	(England)	13 September 1988 (age 37)	Left-handed	Left-arm medium	

=== Women's side ===
The women's team also retained a number of players from the previous season, including Lauren Winfield-Hill, Alice Capsey, Mady Villiers, Marizanne Kapp, Suzie Bates and Dane van Niekerk, with van Niekerk continuing as captain. Paige Scholfield was also drafted to add depth to the bowling line-ups. Kapp and Bates were available throughout the tournament, while van Niekerk initially joined but later withdrew due to a thumb injury, leading to the inclusion of Amanda-Jade Wellington as her replacement. Additionally, Tash Farrant, who was retained, withdrew before the season, and Lizzie Scott was drafted to fill her spot.

- **Bold** denotes players with international caps.

S/N	Name	Nat.	Date of birth (age)	Batting style	Bowling style	Notes
Batters
11	**Suzie Bates**	(New Zealand)	16 September 1987 (age 38)	Right-handed	Right-arm medium / off spin	Overseas player
81	**Dane van Niekerk**	(South Africa)	14 May 1993 (age 33)	Right-handed	Right-arm leg break	Overseas player, Captain
26	**Alice Capsey**	(England)	11 August 2004 (age 21)	Right-handed	Right-arm off break	England international
8	Paige Scholfield	(England)	19 December 1995 (age 30)	Right-handed	Right-arm fast-medium	All-rounder
6	Cordelia Griffith	(England)	19 September 1995 (age 30)	Right-handed	Right-arm medium	
58	**Lauren Winfield-Hill**	(England)	16 August 1990 (age 35)	Right-handed	—	
All-Rounders
7	**Marizanne Kapp**	(South Africa)	4 January 1990 (age 36)	Right-handed	Right-arm fast-medium	Overseas player
16	Sophia Smale	(Wales)	8 December 2004 (age 21)	Right-handed	Slow left-arm orthodox	
29	Ryana MacDonald-Gay	(England)	12 February 2004 (age 22)	Right-handed	Right-arm medium	
32	**Nadine de Klerk**	(South Africa)	16 January 2000 (age 26)	Right-handed	Right-arm fast-medium	Overseas player
Wicketkeepers
20	Kira Chathli	(England)	29 July 1999 (age 27)	Right-handed	—	Wicket-keeper
Pace bowlers
18	Eva Gray	(England)	24 May 2000 (age 26)	Right-handed	Right-arm medium	
62	Hannah Rainey	(Scotland)	2 June 1997 (age 29)	Right-handed	Right-arm medium	
2	Lizzie Scott	(England)	1 September 2004 (age 21)	Right-handed	Right-arm fast-medium	
89	**Shabnim Ismail**		5 October 1988 (age 36)	Left-handed	Right-arm fast-medium	Overseas player
Spin bowlers
22	**Mady Villiers**	(England)	26 August 1998 (age 27)	Right-handed	Right-arm off break	
9	Claudie Cooper	(England)	1 May 2002 (age 24)	Right-handed	Right-arm off break	

== League stage ==
=== Men's results ===
2 August 2023
18:30 (N)
Scorecard

London Spirit; 131 (100 balls)	v	Oval Invincibles; 132/7 (99 balls)
Adam Rossington 39 (21); Nathan Sowter 3/34 (20 balls)		Sam Curran 34 (28); Daniel Worrall 2/23 (20 balls); Jordan Thompson 2/23 (20 balls)

Oval Invincibles won by 3 wickets
Lord's, London
Umpires: Mike Burns (Eng) and Graham Lloyd (Eng)
Player of the match: Sunil Narine (Oval Invincibles)

- Oval Invincibles won the toss and elected to field.
- Points: Oval Invincibles 2, London Spirit 0.

6 August 2023
18:00 (N)
Scorecard

Oval Invincibles; 138/6 (100 balls)	v	Welsh Fire; 138/7 (100 balls)
Jordan Cox 51 (43); Shaheen Afridi 2/22 (20 balls)		Joe Clarke 69* (46); Gus Atkinson 3/26 (20 balls)

Match tied
The Oval, London
Attendance: 21,432
Umpires: Tom Lungley (Eng) and Paul Pollard (Eng)
Player of the match: Tom Curran (Oval Invincibles)

- Welsh Fire won the toss and elected to bat.
- Points: Welsh Fire 1, Oval Invincibles 1.

9 August 2023
18:30 (N)
Scorecard

Oval Invincibles; 186/5 (100 balls)	v	Manchester Originals; 92 (89 balls)
Heinrich Klaasen 60 (27); Jamie Overton 2/21 (20 balls)		Jos Buttler 23 (24); Spencer Johnson 3/1 (20 balls)

Oval Invincibles won by 94 runs
The Oval, London
Umpires: Lubabalo Gcuma (SA) and Rob White (Eng)
Player of the match: Heinrich Klaasen (Oval Invincibles)

- Manchester Originals won the toss and elected to field.
- Points: Oval Invincibles 2, Manchester Originals 0.

11 August 2023
18:30 (N)
Scorecard

Oval Invincibles; 185/5 (100 balls)	v	Northern Superchargers; 176/8 (100 balls)
Jordan Cox 73* (38); Wayne Parnell 2/29 (20 balls)		Tom Banton 81 (43); Gus Atkinson 3/24 (20 balls)

Oval Invincibles won by 9 runs
Headingley, Leeds
Umpires: Steve O'Shaughnessy (Eng) and Russell Warren (Eng)
Player of the match: Jordan Cox (Oval Invincibles)

- Oval Invincibles won the toss and elected to bat.
- Points: Oval Invincibles 2, Northern Superchargers 0.

13 August 2023
18:00 (N)
Scorecard

Birmingham Phoenix; 160/8 (100 balls)	v	Oval Invincibles; 119 (99 balls)
Jamie Smith 60 (33); Zak Chappell 4/33 (15 balls)		Ross Whiteley 35 (31); Kane Richardson 4/32 (19 balls)

Birmingham Phoenix won by 41 runs
Edgbaston, Birmingham
Umpires: Paul Pollard (Eng) and Russell Warren (Eng)
Player of the match: Jamie Smith (Birmingham Phoenix)

- Oval Invincibles won the toss and elected to field.
- Points: Birmingham Phoenix 2, Manchester Originals 0.

15 August 2023
18:30 (N)
Scorecard

Oval Invincibles; 189/4 (100 balls)	v	London Spirit; 187/7 (100 balls)
Will Jacks 68 (42); Daryl Mitchell 2/16 (10 balls)		Adam Rossington 61 (32); Will Jacks 2/22 (15 balls)

Oval Invincibles won by 2 runs
The Oval, London
Umpires: Richard Kettleborough (Eng) and Russell Warren (Eng)
Player of the match: Will Jacks (Oval Invincibles)

- Oval Invincibles won the toss and elected to bat.
- Points: Oval Invincibles 2, London Spirit 0

19 August 2023
18:00 (N)
Scorecard

Oval Invincibles; 139/7 (100 balls)	v	Southern Brave; 131/7 (100 balls)
Tom Curran 43* (28); Chris Jordan 3/20 (20 balls)		Tim David 44* (18); Tom Curran 3/43 (20 balls)

Oval Invincibles won by 8 runs
Rose Bowl, Southampton
Umpires: Neil Bainton (Eng) and Martin Saggers (Eng)
Player of the match: Tom Curran (Oval Invincibles)

- Oval Invincibles won the toss and elected to bat.
- Points: Oval Invincibles 2, Southern Brave 0.

21 August 2023
18:30 (N)
Scorecard

Trent Rockets; 148/7 (100 balls)	v	Oval Invincibles; 151/5 (92 balls)
Colin Munro 36 (25); Adam Zampa 2/20 (20 balls)		Sam Billings 76* (40); Daniel Sams 2/38 (20 balls)

Oval Invincibles won by 5 wickets
The Oval, London
Umpires: Paul Pollard (Eng) and Rob White (Eng)
Player of the match: Sam Billings (Oval Invincibles)

- Trent Rockets won the toss and elected to bat.
- Points: Oval Invincibles 2, Trent Rockets 0.

=== Women's results ===
2 August 2023
15:00
Scorecard

London Spirit	v	Oval Invincibles

Match abandoned
Lord's, London
Umpires: James Middlebrook (Eng) and Jasmine Naeem (Eng)

- No toss.
- No play was possible due to rain.
- Points: London Spirit 1, Oval Invincibles 1.

6 August 2023
14:30
Scorecard

Oval Invincibles; 80 (98 balls)	v	Welsh Fire; 81/7 (80 balls)
Lauren Winfield-Hill 42 (35); Shabnim Ismail 3/12 (20 balls)		Georgia Elwiss 33 (29); Marizanne Kapp 4/18 (20 balls)

Welsh Fire won by 3 wickets
The Oval, London
Umpires: Lubabalo Gcuma (SA) and James Middlebrook (Eng)
Player of the match: Shabnim Ismail (Welsh Fire)

- Welsh Fire won the toss and elected to field.
- Points: Welsh Fire 2, Oval Invincibles 0.

9 August 2023
15:00
Scorecard

Oval Invincibles; 128/7 (100 balls)	v	Manchester Originals; 123/9 (100 balls)
Alice Capsey 50 (41); Mahika Gaur 1/13 (20 balls)		Deandra Dottin 42 (26); Ryana MacDonald-Gay 4/16 (20 balls)

Oval Invincibles won by 5 runs
The Oval, London
Umpires: Jack Shantry (Eng) and Sophie McLelland (Eng)
Player of the match: Ryana MacDonald-Gay (Oval Invincibles)

- Manchester Originals won the toss and elected to field.
- Points: Oval Invincibles 2, Manchester Originals 0.

11 August 2023
15:00
Scorecard

Northern Superchargers; 143/4 (100 balls)	v	Oval Invincibles; 129/5 (100 balls)
Phoebe Litchfield 68 (45); Marizanne Kapp 2/22 (20 balls)		Cordelia Griffith 30* (15); Georgia Wareham 2/20 (20 balls)

Northern Superchargers won by 14 runs
Headingley, Leeds
Umpires: Joanne Ibbotson (Eng) and Neil Pratt (Eng)
Player of the match: Phoebe Litchfield (Northern Superchargers)

- Northern Superchargers won the toss and elected to bat first.
- Points: Northern Superchargers 2, Oval Invincibles 0.

13 August 2023
14:30
Scorecard

Oval Invincibles; 142/5 (100 balls)	v	Birmingham Phoenix; 132/6 (100 balls)
Marizanne Kapp 64* (40); Katie Levick 2/19 (20 balls)		Sophie Devine 53 (34); Paige Scholfield 3/30 (20 balls)

Oval Invincibles won by 10 runs
Edgbaston, Birmingham
Umpires: Sue Redfern (Eng) and Jack Shantry (Eng)
Player of the match: Marizanne Kapp (Oval Invincibles)

- Birmingham Phoenix won the toss and elected to field.
- Points: Oval Invincibles 2, Birmingham Phoenix 0.

15 August 2023
15:00
Scorecard

London Spirit; 118/9 (100 balls)	v	Oval Invincibles; 97 (100 balls)
Danielle Gibson 22 (14); Marizanne Kapp 2/13 (20 balls)		Marizanne Kapp 30 (24); Amelia Kerr 3/16 (20 balls)

London Spirit won by 21 runs
The Oval, London
Umpires: Neil Bainton (Eng) and Sue Redfern (Eng)
Player of the match: Tara Norris (London Spirit)

- Oval Invincibles won the toss and elected to field.
- Points: London Spirit 2, Oval Invincibles 0.

19 August 2023
14:30
Scorecard

Oval Invincibles; 130/6 (100 balls)	v	Southern Brave; 132/3 (96 balls)
Suzie Bates 55 (46); Maitlan Brown 1/8 (5 balls)		Georgia Adams 50* (32); Marizanne Kapp 1/18 (20 balls)

Southern Brave won by 7 wickets
Rose Bowl, Southampton
Umpires: Anthony Harris (Eng) and Sophie McLelland (Eng)
Player of the match: Georgia Adams (Southern Brave)

- Oval Invincibles won the toss and elected to bat.
- Points: Southern Brave 2, Oval Invincibles 0.

21 August 2023
15:00
Scorecard

Oval Invincibles; 156/6 (100 balls)	v	Trent Rockets; 152/8 (100 balls)
Nadine de Klerk 51* (25); Kirstie Gordon 2/19 (20 balls)		Lizelle Lee 61 (33); Sophia Smale 2/26 (20 balls)

Oval Invincibles won by 3 runs
The Oval, London
Umpires: Anthony Harris (Eng) and Sophie McLelland (Eng)
Player of the match: Nadine de Klerk (Oval Invincibles)

- Oval Invincibles won the toss and elected to bat.
- Points: Oval Invincibles 2, Trent Rockets 0.

== Standings ==
=== Men ===
Pos	Team	Pld	W	L	T	NR	Pts	NRR
1	Oval Invincibles (C)	8	6	1	1	0	13	0.563
2	Manchester Originals	8	4	3	0	1	9	0.521
3	Southern Brave	8	4	3	0	1	9	0.061
4	Welsh Fire	8	4	3	1	0	9	−0.055
5	Trent Rockets	8	3	4	0	1	7	0.184
6	Birmingham Phoenix	8	2	4	0	2	6	−0.087
7	London Spirit	8	2	4	0	2	6	−0.658
8	Northern Superchargers	8	2	5	0	1	5	−0.707

Source: BBC Sport, ESPN Cricinfo
(C) Champions

advanced to Final
advanced to the Eliminator

=== Women ===
Pos	Team	Pld	W	L	T	NR	Pts	NRR
1	Southern Brave (C)	8	7	1	0	0	14	0.681
2	Northern Superchargers	8	6	2	0	0	12	0.357
3	Welsh Fire	8	5	2	0	1	11	0.602
4	Trent Rockets	8	3	4	0	1	7	−0.003
5	Oval Invincibles	8	3	4	0	1	7	−0.366
6	London Spirit	8	2	4	0	2	6	0.341
7	Manchester Originals	8	2	4	0	2	6	−0.778
8	Birmingham Phoenix	8	0	7	0	1	1	−0.923

Source: BBC Sport, ESPN Cricinfo
(C) Champions

advanced to Final
advanced to the Eliminator

== Knockout stages ==
=== Men ===
Having topped the table, the men's team went straight to the final where they met the Manchester Originals. Tom Curran starred with the bat, hitting 67 from 34 balls in the Invincibiles total of 167/5, before Richard Gleeson's 2/37 restricted the Originals to 147/6.

==== Final ====
27 August 2023
18:00 (N)
Scorecard

Oval Invincibles; 161/5 (100 balls)	v	Manchester Originals; 147/6 (100 balls)
Tom Curran 67* (34); Richard Gleeson 2/37 (20 balls)		Max Holden 37 (25); Will Jacks 2/11 (15 balls)

Oval Invincibles won by 14 runs
Lord's, London
Umpires: Mike Burns (Eng) and Alex Wharf (Eng)
Player of the match: Tom Curran (Oval Invincibles)

- Manchester Originals won the toss and elected to field.
