= 2021 Oval Invincibles season =

Oval Invincibles
2021 season
- Coach: (Australia) Tom Moody (Men's team) (England) Jonathan Batty (Women's team)
- Captain: (England) Sam Billings (Men's team) (South Africa) Dane van Niekerk (Women's team)
- Overseas player: (South Africa) Colin Ingram (Cricket West Indies) Sunil Narine (South Africa) Tabraiz Shamsi (Men's team) (South Africa) Shabnim Ismail (South Africa) Marizanne Kapp (South Africa) Dane van Niekerk (Women's team)
- Ground(s): The Oval
- The Hundred (Men's): 4th
- The Hundred (Women's): Winners
- Most runs: Jason Roy: 186 (Men's team); Dane van Niekerk: 259 (Women's team)
- Most wickets: Sam Curran: 10 (Men's team); Tash Farrant: 18 (Women's team)
- Most catches: Laurie Evans: 5 (Men's team); Grace Gibbs & Alice Capsey: 6 (Women's team)

The 2021 season was the Oval Invincibles' first season of the new franchise 100-ball cricket tournament, The Hundred. The women's team won the tournament, while the men's team finished 4th.

== Players ==
=== Men's side ===
The eight franchises were allowed to select one centrally-contracted Test player from their affiliated counties. In the case of the Invincibles, this gave them first refusal of any Kent or Surrey Test player, and led to the selection of Sam Curran.

Then, once each team had chosen a Test player, any remaining Test player would be automatically allocated to his ‘home’ franchise, meaning Surrey's Rory Burns also joined the side.

For the first season of the Hundred only, the franchises were also given first refusal to draft two "local icons": high-profile players who played for one of their affiliated counties. The Invincibles selected Surrey stars Jason Roy (£125,000) and Tom Curran (£75,000).

The Surrey contingent grew with the draft, with four additions bringing the total to eight. Fast bowler Reece Topley was signed for £60,000, opener Will Jacks followed in the £40,000 round and Laurie Evans was picked up in the £30,000 round. All-rounder Jordan Clark was drafted in February for an undisclosed amount.

Kent were initially represented with the drafting of Alex Blake (£40,000) and Sam Billings (£100,000), who was named team captain. Then, shortly before the beginning of the tournament, a third Kent player, Jordan Cox, was added to the ranks as a wildcard, a secondary draft held shortly before the start of the tournament which gives teams the chance to select players who had impressed in the recent T20 Blast season.

The franchises were allowed to draft three overseas players. West Indies star Sunil Narine was, along with Jason Roy, the Invincibles' most expensive acquisition at £125,000.

In the initial 2019 draft, they selected Nepal's Sandeep Lamichhane and West Indies' Fabian Allen but neither ultimately played for the team. By the time the postponed season began, Colin Ingram had been drafted, and he would later be joined by South African compatriot Tabraiz Shamsi, a late replacement for Lamichhane, who had had visa issues.

- **Bold** denotes players with international caps.

S/N	Name	Nat.	Date of birth (age)	Batting style	Bowling style	Notes
Batsmen
9	Will Jacks	(England)	21 November 1998 (age 27)	Right-handed	Right-arm off break	
10	Alex Blake	(England)	25 January 1989 (age 37)	Left-handed	Right-arm off break	
17	**Rory Burns**	(England)	26 August 1990 (age 36)	Left-handed	Right-arm medium	Centrally Contracted player
20	**Jason Roy**	(England)	21 July 1990 (age 36)	Right-handed	Right-arm medium	
32	Laurie Evans	(England)	12 October 1987 (age 38)	Right-handed	Right-arm off break	
All Rounders
16	Jordan Clark	(England)	14 October 1990 (age 35)	Right-handed	Right-arm fast-medium	
41	**Colin Ingram**	(South Africa)	3 July 1985 (age 41)	Left-handed	Right-arm leg break	Overseas player
58	**Sam Curran**	(England)	3 June 1998 (age 28)	Left-handed	Left-arm fast-medium	Centrally Contracted player
59	**Tom Curran**	(England)	12 March 1995 (age 31)	Right-handed	Right-arm fast-medium	Local Icon player
74	**Sunil Narine**	(Cricket West Indies)	26 May 1988 (age 38)	Left-handed	Right-arm off break	Overseas player
Wicketkeepers
7	**Sam Billings**	(England)	15 June 1991 (age 35)	Right-handed	—	Captain
22	Jordan Cox	(England)	21 October 2000 (age 25)	Right-handed	—	Wildcard pick
Pace bowlers
8	**Saqib Mahmood**	(England)	25 February 1997 (age 29)	Right-handed	Right-arm fast-medium	
23	**Reece Topley**	(England)	21 February 1994 (age 32)	Right-handed	Left-arm fast-medium	
44	**Brandon Glover**	(Netherlands)	3 April 1997 (age 29)	Right-handed	Right-arm fast	
Spin bowlers
26	**Tabraiz Shamsi**	(South Africa)	18 February 1990 (age 36)	Right-handed	Slow left-arm unorthodox	Overseas player
72	Nathan Sowter	(England)	12 October 1992 (age 33)	Right-handed	Right-arm leg break	

=== Women's side ===
- **Bold** denotes players with international caps.

S/N	Name	Nat.	Date of birth (age)	Batting style	Bowling style	Notes
Batters
1	Georgia Adams	(England)	4 October 1993 (age 32)	Right-handed	Right-arm medium	
35	**Fran Wilson**	(England)	7 November 1991 (age 34)	Right-handed	Right-arm off break	Centrally Contracted player
All Rounders
23	Jo Gardner	(England)	25 March 1997 (age 29)	Right-handed	Right-arm off break	
26	Alice Capsey	(England)	11 August 2004 (age 22)	Right-handed	Right-arm off break	
81	**Dane van Niekerk**	(South Africa)	24 May 1993 (age 33)	Right-handed	Right-arm leg break	Captain; Overseas player
Wicketkeepers
8	**Sarah Bryce**	(Scotland)	8 January 2000 (age 26)	Right-handed	—	
17	Rhianna Southby	(England)	16 October 2000 (age 25)	Right-handed	—	
Pace bowlers
7	**Marizanne Kapp**	(South Africa)	4 January 1990 (age 36)	Right-handed	Right-arm medium	Overseas player
18	Eva Gray	(England)	24 May 2000 (age 26)	Right-handed	Right-arm medium	
53	**Tash Farrant**	(England)	29 May 1996 (age 30)	Left-handed	Left-arm fast-medium	
61	Grace Gibbs	(England)	1 May 1995 (age 31)	Right-handed	Right-arm medium	
89	**Shabnim Ismail**	(South Africa)	5 October 1988 (age 37)	Left-handed	Right-arm fast-medium	Overseas player
Spin bowlers
6	Megan Belt	(England)	6 October 1997 (age 28)	Right-handed	Right-arm off break	
19	Danielle Gregory	(England)	4 December 1998 (age 27)	Right-handed	Right-arm leg break	
22	**Mady Villiers**	(England)	26 August 1998 (age 28)	Right-handed	Right-arm off break	

== League Stage ==
=== Men's results ===
==== July ====
22 July 2021
18:30 (N)
Scorecard

Oval Invincibles; 145/8 (100 balls)	v	Manchester Originals; 136/7 (100 balls)
Sam Billings 49 (30); Fred Klaassen 3/23 (15 balls)		Carlos Brathwaite 37 (29); Nathan Sowter 2/18 (15 balls)

Oval Invincibles won by 9 runs
The Oval, London
Attendance: 18,126
Umpires: David Millns and Martin Saggers
Player of the match: Sam Billings (Oval Invincibles)

- Manchester Originals won the toss and elected to field.
- Points: Oval Invincibles 2, Manchester Originals 0.

25 July 2021
14:30
Scorecard

Oval Invincibles	v	London Spirit

No result
Lord's, London
Umpires: Rob Bailey and Peter Hartley

- London Spirit won the toss and elected to field.
- No play was possible due to rain.
- Points: London Spirit 1, Oval Invincibles 1.

31 July 2021
18:00 (N)
Scorecard

Oval Invincibles; 127/6 (100 balls)	v	Northern Superchargers; 128/4 (97 balls)
Jason Roy 52* (43); Adil Rashid 3/13 (20 balls)		Chris Lynn 48 (48); Saqib Mahmood 2/19 (20 balls)

Northern Superchargers won by 6 wickets
Headingley, Leeds
Attendance: 10,859
Umpires: Nick Cook and Alex Wharf
Player of the match: Harry Brook (Northern Superchargers)

- Oval Invincibles won the toss and elected to bat.
- Points: Northern Superchargers 2, Oval Invincibles 0.

==== August ====
2 August 2021
18:30 (N)
Scorecard

Welsh Fire; 121/7 (100 balls)	v	Oval Invincibles; 125/4 (93 balls)
Ben Duckett 65 (52); Tom Curran 3/29 (20 balls)		Sam Billings 40* (34); James Neesham 2/23 (20 balls)

Oval Invincibles won by 6 wickets
The Oval, London
Attendance: 21,279
Umpires: Neil Mallender and Alex Wharf
Player of the match: Sam Billings (Oval Invincibles)

- Oval Invincibles won the toss and elected to field.
- Points: Oval Invincibles 2, Welsh Fire 0.

4 August 2021
19:00 (N)
Scorecard

Oval Invincibles; 172/3 (100 balls)	v	Birmingham Phoenix; 174/4 (94 balls)
Colin Ingram 81* (43); Pat Brown 2/34 (20 balls)		Moeen Ali 49 (26); Saqib Mahmood 2/34 (20 balls)

Birmingham Phoenix won by 6 wickets
Edgbaston, Birmingham
Umpires: Peter Hartley and Russell Warren
Player of the match: Chris Benjamin (Birmingham Phoenix)

- Birmingham Phoenix won the toss and elected to field.
- Points: Birmingham Phoenix 2, Oval Invincibles 0.

8 August 2021
19:00 (N)
Scorecard

Oval Invincibles; 125/6 (65 balls)	v	Trent Rockets; 116/8 (65 balls)
Jason Roy 56* (29); Samit Patel 2/21 (15 balls)		Lewis Gregory 28* (12); Sunil Narine 3/11 (10 balls)

Oval Invincibles won by 9 runs
The Oval, London
Attendance: 19,382
Umpires: Nick Cook and Nigel Llong
Player of the match: Jason Roy (Oval Invincibles)

- Trent Rockets won the toss and elected to field.
- The match was reduced to 65 balls per side due to rain.
- Points: Oval Invincibles 2, Trent Rockets 0.

14 August 2021
19:00 (N)
Scorecard

London Spirit; 146/7 (100 balls)	v	Oval Invincibles; 147/8 (95 balls)
Eoin Morgan 41 (20); Tabraiz Shamsi 3/25 (20 balls)		Laurie Evans 67* (37); Brad Wheal 2/23 (20 balls)

Oval Invincibles won by 2 wickets
The Oval, London
Umpires: Nick Cook and Neil Mallender
Player of the match: Laurie Evans (Oval Invincibles)

- London Spirit won the toss and elected to bat.
- Points: Oval Invincibles 2, London Spirit 0.

16 August 2021
19:00 (N)
Scorecard

Oval Invincibles; 134/7 (100 balls)	v	Southern Brave; 135/4 (95 balls)
Alex Blake 44* (28); Jake Lintott 3/14 (20 balls)		Colin de Grandhomme 40* (28); Tom Curran 1/8 (15 balls)

Southern Brave won by 6 wickets
Rose Bowl, Southampton
Umpires: Rob Bailey and Martin Saggers
Player of the match: Alex Davies (Southern Brave)

- Southern Brave won the toss and elected to field.
- Points: Southern Brave 2, Oval Invincibles 0.

=== Women's results ===
==== July ====
21 July 2021
18:30 (N)
Scorecard

Manchester Originals; 135/6 (100 balls)	v	Oval Invincibles; 139/5 (98 balls)
Lizelle Lee 42 (39); Tash Farrant 3/25 (20 balls)		Dane van Niekerk 56* (42); Kate Cross 3/28 (18 balls)

Oval Invincibles won by 5 wickets
The Oval, London
Umpires: Sue Redfern and Tim Robinson
Player of the match: Dane van Niekerk (Oval Invincibles)

- Manchester Originals won the toss and elected to bat.
- Points: Oval Invincibles 2, Manchester Originals 0.

25 July 2021
11:00
Scorecard

Oval Invincibles; 132/7 (100 balls)	v	London Spirit; 117/7 (100 balls)
Alice Capsey 59 (41); Naomi Dattani 2/23 (15 balls)		Heather Knight 40 (29); Dane van Niekerk 3/30 (20 balls)

Oval Invincibles won by 15 runs
Lord's, London
Umpires: Anna Harris and Graham Lloyd
Player of the match: Alice Capsey (Oval Invincibles)

- London Spirit won the toss and elected to field.
- Points: Oval Invincibles 2, London Spirit 0.

31 July 2021
14:30
Scorecard

Northern Superchargers; 109/8 (100 balls)	v	Oval Invincibles; 105/4 (100 balls)
Alice Davidson-Richards 42 (30); Alice Capsey 2/9 (20 balls)		Sarah Bryce 29 (33); Alice Davidson-Richards 2/17 (20 balls)

Northern Superchargers won by 4 runs
Headingley, Leeds
Umpires: Anna Harris and Steve O'Shaughnessy
Player of the match: Alice Davidson-Richards (Northern Superchargers)

- Oval Invincibles won the toss and elected to field.
- Points: Northern Superchargers 2, Oval Invincibles 0.

==== August ====
2 August 2021
15:00
Scorecard

Welsh Fire; 112/6 (100 balls)	v	Oval Invincibles; 100/9 (100 balls)
Georgia Redmayne 30 (29); Dane van Niekerk 1/10 (20 balls)		Grace Gibbs 21 (22); Hayley Matthews 3/23 (20 balls)

Welsh Fire won by 12 runs
The Oval, London
Umpires: Graham Lloyd and Sue Redfern
Player of the match: Sarah Taylor (Welsh Fire)

- Oval Invincibles won the toss and elected to field.
- Points: Welsh Fire 2, Oval Invincibles 0.

4 August 2021
15:30
Scorecard

Birmingham Phoenix; 129/9 (100 balls)	v	Oval Invincibles; 133/2 (97 balls)
Erin Burns 45 (28); Tash Farrant 3/23 (20 balls)		Dane van Niekerk 67* (51); Kirstie Gordon 2/20 (20 balls)

Oval Invincibles won by 8 wickets
Edgbaston, Birmingham
Umpires: Jasmine Naeem and Martin Saggers
Player of the match: Tash Farrant (Oval Invincibles)

- Birmingham Phoenix won the toss and elected to bat.
- Points: Oval Invincibles 2, Birmingham Phoenix 0.

8 August 2021
15:30
Scorecard

Trent Rockets	v	Oval Invincibles

No result
The Oval, London
Umpires: Rob Bailey and Sarah Bartlett

- Trent Rockets won the toss and elected to bat.
- No play was possible due to rain.
- Points: Oval Invincibles 1, Trent Rockets 1.

14 August 2021
15:30
Scorecard

London Spirit; 103/9 (100 balls)	v	Oval Invincibles; 107/2 (87 balls)
Tammy Beaumont 42 (34); Marizanne Kapp 2/12 (20 balls)		Georgia Adams 37* (34); Charlie Dean 1/24 (17 balls)

Oval Invincibles won by 8 wickets
The Oval, London
Umpires: Anna Harris and Tim Robinson
Player of the match: Georgia Adams (Oval Invincibles)

- Oval Invincibles won the toss and elected to field.
- Points: Oval Invincibles 2, London Spirit 0.

16 August 2021
15:30
Scorecard

Southern Brave; 115/3 (100 balls)	v	Oval Invincibles; 85 (94 balls)
Sophia Dunkley 58* (39); Tash Farrant 2/22 (20 balls)		Dane van Niekerk 31 (32); Amanda-Jade Wellington 4/12 (20 balls)

Southern Brave won by 30 runs
Rose Bowl, Southampton
Umpires: Nick Cook and Jasmine Naeem
Player of the match: Sophia Dunkley (Southern Brave)

- Oval Invincibles won the toss and elected to field.
- Points: Southern Brave 2, Oval Invincibles 0.

== Standings ==
=== Men ===
Pos	Team	Pld	W	L	T	NR	Pts	NRR
1	Birmingham Phoenix	8	6	2	0	0	12	1.087
2	Southern Brave	8	5	2	0	1	11	0.034
3	Trent Rockets	8	5	3	0	0	10	0.035
4	Oval Invincibles	8	4	3	0	1	9	0.123
5	Northern Superchargers	8	3	4	0	1	7	0.510
6	Manchester Originals	8	2	4	0	2	6	−0.361
7	Welsh Fire	8	3	5	0	0	6	−0.827
8	London Spirit	8	1	6	0	1	3	−0.641

Source: ESPN Cricinfo, Sky Sports

advances to the Final
advances to the Eliminator

=== Women ===
Pos	Team	Pld	W	L	T	NR	Pts	NRR
1	Southern Brave	8	7	1	0	0	14	1.056
2	Oval Invincibles	8	4	3	0	1	9	0.015
3	Birmingham Phoenix	8	4	4	0	0	8	0.186
4	London Spirit	8	4	4	0	0	8	0.046
5	Manchester Originals	8	3	4	0	1	7	0.016
6	Northern Superchargers	8	3	4	0	1	7	−0.041
7	Trent Rockets	8	3	4	0	1	7	−0.293
8	Welsh Fire	8	2	6	0	0	4	−1.017

Source: ESPN Cricinfo, Sky Sports

advances to the Final
advances to the Eliminator

== Knockout stages ==
=== Women ===
==== Eliminator ====
20 August 2021
15:00
Scorecard

Oval Invincibles; 114/7 (100 balls)	v	Birmingham Phoenix; 94 (94 balls)
Marizanne Kapp 37 (37); Kirstie Gordon 2/22 (20 balls)		Amy Jones 35 (25); Tash Farrant 4/10 (19 balls)

Oval Invincibles won by 20 runs
The Oval, London
Umpires: Rob Bailey and Anna Harris
Player of the match: Tash Farrant (Oval Invincibles)

- Birmingham Phoenix won the toss and elected to field.

==== Final ====
21 August 2021
15:00
Scorecard

Oval Invincibles; 121/6 (100 balls)	v	Southern Brave; 73 (98 balls)
Marizanne Kapp 26 (14); Anya Shrubsole 2/16 (20 balls)		Fi Morris 23 (26); Marizanne Kapp 4/9 (18 balls)

Oval Invincibles won by 48 runs
Lord's, London
Umpires: Steve O'Shaughnessy and Sue Redfern

- Southern Brave won the toss and elected to field.
