= 2025 Oval Invincibles season =

Cricket team season

2025 season
- Coach: (Australia) Tom Moody (Men's team) (England) Jonathan Batty (Women's team)
- Captain: (England) Sam Billings (Men's team) (England) Lauren Winfield-Hill (Women's team)
- Overseas player: Jason Behrendorff; Donovan Ferreira; Rashid Khan; Adam Zampa; (Men's team); Marizanne Kapp; Meg Lanning; Amanda-Jade Wellington; (Women's team)
- Ground(s): The Oval
- The Hundred (Men's): Winners
- The Hundred (Women's): 6th

The 2025 season was the Oval Invincibles' 5th season of the 100-ball franchise cricket tournament, The Hundred. The men's team were victorious for the third consecutive year, following on from the women's team winning the first two editions of their tournament.

Earlier in the year, it was announced that the England and Wales Cricket Board's 49% stake in the franchise had been sold to Reliance Industries Limited (RIL), the owners of the Indian Premier League's Mumbai Indians.

During the season, reports suggested that 2025 would be the team's last season as the Invincibles, before they were to be rebranded as MI London, in keeping with RIL's other overseas franchises.

== Players ==
=== Men's side ===
The Invincibles men's squad retained eleven players from the previous season:

- Sam Curran (central contract)
- Tom Curran (£200k)
- Will Jacks (£200k)
- Jordan Cox (£120k)
- Rashid Khan (£120k)
- Sam Billings (£78.5k)
- Saqib Mahmood (£78.5k)
- Gus Atkinson (£63k)
- Nathan Sowter (£52k)
- Donovan Ferreira (£52k)
- Tawanda Muyeye (£41.5k)

In the draft, they picked up Surrey all-rounder Jordan Clark (£41.5k), Gloucestershire batter Miles Hammond (£31k) and their third overseas player, Australian paceman Jason Behrendorff (£63.5k). Adam Zampa returned to the side for the third consecutive season when he replaced Rashid Khan for the final.

George Scrimshaw and Zafar Gohar (both £31k) were selected as wildcard picks.

=== Men's side ===
| No. | Name | Nationality | Date of birth (age) | Batting style | Bowling style | Notes |
Batters
| 8 | Miles Hammond | England | 11 January 1996 (age 30) | Left-handed | Right-arm off break | |
| 14 | Tawanda Muyeye | Zimbabwe | 5 March 2001 (age 25) | Right-handed | Right-arm off break | Domestic player |
| 22 | Jordan Cox | England | 21 October 2000 (age 25) | Right-handed | — | |
All-rounders
| 9 | Will Jacks | England | 21 November 1998 (age 27) | Right-handed | Right-arm off break | |
| 16 | Jordan Clark | England | 14 October 1990 (age 35) | Right-handed | Right-arm fast-medium | |
| 58 | Sam Curran | England | 3 June 1998 (age 28) | Left-handed | Left-arm fast-medium | Centrally contracted player |
| 59 | Tom Curran | England | 12 March 1995 (age 31) | Right-handed | Right-arm fast-medium | |
Wicket-keepers
| 2 | Donovan Ferreira | South Africa | 21 July 1998 (age 28) | Right-handed | Right-arm off break | Overseas player |
| 7 | Sam Billings | England | 15 June 1991 (age 35) | Right-handed | — | Captain |
Pace bowlers
| 5 | Jason Behrendorff | Australia | 20 April 1990 (age 36) | Right-handed | Left-arm fast-medium | Overseas player |
| 25 | Saqib Mahmood | England | 25 February 1997 (age 29) | Right-handed | Right-arm fast-medium | |
| 37 | Gus Atkinson | England | 19 January 1998 (age 28) | Right-handed | Right-arm fast-medium | |
| 98 | George Scrimshaw | England | 10 February 1998 (age 28) | Right-handed | Right-arm fast | Wildcard player |
Spin bowlers
| 19 | Rashid Khan | Afghanistan | 20 September 1998 (age 27) | Right-handed | Right-arm leg break | Overseas player until 21 August |
| 72 | Nathan Sowter | Australia | 12 October 1992 (age 33) | Right-handed | Right-arm leg break | UK passport |
| 77 | Zafar Gohar | Pakistan | 1 February 1995 (age 31) | Left-handed | Slow left-arm orthodox | Domestic player; Wildcard player |
| 88 | Adam Zampa | Australia | 31 March 1992 (age 34) | Right-handed | Right-arm leg break | Overseas player 31 August; Replacement player |

=== Women's side ===
| No. | Name | Nationality | Date of birth (age) | Batting style | Bowling style | Notes |
Batters
| 3 | Meg Lanning | Australia | 15 March 1992 (age 34) | Right-handed | Right-arm medium | Overseas player |
| 8 | Paige Scholfield | England | 19 December 1995 (age 30) | Right-handed | Right-arm medium | |
| 14 | Jo Gardner | England | 25 March 1997 (age 29) | Right-handed | Right-arm off break | |
All-rounders
| 7 | Marizanne Kapp | South Africa | 4 January 1990 (age 36) | Right-handed | Right-arm medium | Overseas player |
| 18 | Phoebe Franklin | England | 18 February 1998 (age 28) | Right-handed | Right-arm medium | |
| 26 | Alice Capsey | England | 11 August 2004 (age 22) | Right-handed | Right-arm off break | |
Wicket-keepers
| 36 | Rebecca Odgers | England | 10 February 2003 (age 23) | Right-handed | Right-arm off break | Wildcard player |
| 58 | Lauren Winfield-Hill | England | 16 August 1990 (age 36) | Right-handed | — | Captain |
Pace bowlers
| 15 | Daisy Gibb | England | 29 November 2005 (age 20) | Right-handed | Right-arm medium | Wildcard player |
| 29 | Ryana MacDonald-Gay | England | 12 February 2004 (age 22) | Right-handed | Right-arm medium | Ruled out through injury |
| 45 | Ellie Anderson | England | 30 October 2003 (age 22) | Right-handed | Right-arm medium | Replacement player |
| 53 | Tash Farrant | England | 29 May 1996 (age 30) | Left-handed | Left-arm medium | |
| 72 | Rachel Slater | Scotland | 20 November 2001 (age 24) | Right-handed | Left-arm medium | |
Spin bowlers
| 9 | Kalea Moore | England | 27 March 2003 (age 23) | Right-handed | Right-arm off break | |
| 10 | Amanda-Jade Wellington | Australia | 29 May 1997 (age 29) | Right-handed | Right-arm leg break | Overseas player |
| 16 | Sophia Smale | Wales | 8 December 2004 (age 21) | Right-handed | Slow left-arm orthodox | |

== League stage ==
=== Men's results ===
Match 1
5 August 2025
18:30 (D/N)
Scorecard

| London Spirit; 80 (94 balls) | v | Oval Invincibles; 81/4 (69 balls) |
| Ashton Turner 21 (14); Rashid Khan 3/11 (20 balls) | | Will Jacks 24 (24); Liam Dawson 2/9 (20 balls) |

Oval Invincibles won by 6 wickets
Lord's, London
Umpires: James Middlebrook and David Millns
Player of the match: Rashid Khan (Oval Invincibles)

- London Spirit won the toss and elected to bat.

Match 5
9 August 2025
14:30
Scorecard

| Manchester Originals; 128 (100 balls) | v | Oval Invincibles; 129/1 (57 balls) |
| Phil Salt 41 (32); Rashid Khan 3/19 (20 balls) | | Will Jacks 61 (26); Lewis Gregory 1/31 (10 balls) |

Oval Invincibles won by 9 wickets
The Oval, London
Umpires: Martin Saggers and Russell Warren
Player of the match: Rashid Khan (Oval Invincibles)

- Oval Invincibles won the toss and elected to field.

Match 10
12 August 2025
18:30 (D/N)
Scorecard

| Birmingham Phoenix; 182/6 (98 balls) | v | Oval Invincibles; 180/8 (100 balls) |
| Liam Livingstone 69 (27); Trent Boult 2/20 (20 balls) | | Donovan Ferreira 63 (29); Saqib Mahmood 3/28 (13 balls) |

Birmingham Phoenix won by 4 wickets
Edgbaston, Birmingham
Umpires: Mike Burns and Russell Warren
Player of the match: Liam Livingstone (Birmingham Phoenix)

- Birmingham Phoenix won the toss and elected to field.

Match 16
16 August 2025
14:30
Scorecard

| Oval Invincibles; 150/5 (100 balls) | v | Welsh Fire; 111 (97 balls) |
| Alice Capsey 55 (34); Hayley Matthews 2/18 (20 balls) | | Sophia Dunkley 56 (41); Sophia Smale 3/13 (17 balls) |

Oval Invincibles won by 39 runs
The Oval, London
Umpires: Rose Fernando and Surendiran Shanmugam
Player of the match: Marizanne Kapp (Oval Invincibles)

- Oval Invincibles won the toss and elected to bat.

Match 19
18 August 2025
18:30 (D/N)
Scorecard

| Southern Brave; 133 (98 balls) | v | Oval Invincibles; 134/3 (89 balls) |
| Hilton Cartwright 42 (30); Rashid Khan 3/20 (20 balls) | | Jordan Cox 56 (37); Craig Overton 2/21 (20 balls) |

Oval Invincibles won by 7 wickets
Rose Bowl, Southampton
Umpires: Ben Debenham and Alex Wharf
Player of the match: Sam Curran (Oval Invincibles)

- Oval Invincibles won the toss and elected to field.

Match 23
21 August 2025
18:30 (D/N)
Scorecard

| Trent Rockets; 171/7 (100 balls) | v | Oval Invincibles; 173/4 (89 balls) |
| Joe Root 76 (41); Rashid Khan 2/19 (20 balls) | | Jordan Cox 58* (32); Rehan Ahmed 2/25 (20 balls) |

Oval Invincibles won by 6 wickets
The Oval, London
Umpires: Nigel Llong and Martin Saggers
Player of the match: Sam Curran (Oval Invincibles)

- Oval Invincibles won the toss and elected to field.

Match 25
23 August 2025
14:30
Scorecard

| Northern Superchargers; 198/4 (100 balls) | v | Oval Invincibles; 182/7 (100 balls) |
| Harry Brook 56 (27); Nathan Sowter 1/29 (20 balls) | | Donovan Ferreira 41 (15); Tom Lawes 2/22 (20 balls) |

Northern Superchargers won by 16 runs
Headingley, Leeds
Umpires: Michael Gough and Neil Pratt
Player of the match: Harry Brook (Northern Superchargers)

- Oval Invincibles won the toss and elected to field.

Match 29
25 August 2025
18:30 (D/N)
Scorecard

| London Spirit; 152/7 (100 balls) | v | Oval Invincibles; 153/4 (78 balls) |
| Jamie Overton 31 (18); Nathan Sowter 2/23 (20 balls) | | Jordan Cox 47 (27); Liam Dawson 2/30 (18 balls) |

Oval Invincibles won by 6 wickets
The Oval, London
Umpires: Ben Debenham and Rob White
Player of the match: Will Jacks (Oval Invincibles)

- Oval Invincibles won the toss and elected to field.

=== Women's results ===
Match 1
5 August 2025
14:45
Scorecard

| London Spirit; 176/5 (100 balls) | v | Oval Invincibles; 159/4 (100 balls) |
| Grace Harris 89* (42); Marizanne Kapp 2/23 (20 balls) | | Meg Lanning 85 (51); Issy Wong 2/26 (20 balls) |

London Spirit won by 17 runs
Lord's, London
Umpires: Sue Redfern and Jack Shantry
Player of the match: Grace Harris (London Spirit)

- Oval Invincibles won the toss and elected to field.

Match 5
9 August 2025
11:00
Scorecard

| Manchester Originals; 139/6 (100 balls) | v | Oval Invincibles; 137/3 (100 balls) |
| Beth Mooney 70 (45); Marizanne Kapp 2/22 (20 balls) | | Meg Lanning 57 (42); Sophie Ecclestone 1/18 (20 balls) |

Manchester Originals won by 2 runs
The Oval, London
Umpires: Rose Fernando and Surendiran Shanmugam
Player of the match: Beth Mooney (Manchester Originals)

- Oval Invincibles won the toss and elected to field.

Match 10
12 August 2025
15:00
Scorecard

| Oval Invincibles; 174/5 (100 balls) | v | Birmingham Phoenix; 152/6 (100 balls) |
| Alice Capsey 52 (29); Hannah Baker 2/24 (20 balls) | | Ailsa Lister 33 (18); Amanda-Jade Wellington 2/27 (20 balls) |

Oval Invincibles won by 2 runs
Edgbaston, Birmingham
Umpires: Rose Fernando and Neil Pratt
Player of the match: Alice Capsey (Oval Invincibles)

- Oval Invincibles won the toss and elected to bat.

Match 16
16 August 2025
14:30
Scorecard

| Oval Invincibles; 150/5 (100 balls) | v | Welsh Fire; 111 (97 balls) |
| Alice Capsey 55 (34); Hayley Matthews 2/18 (20 balls) | | Sophia Dunkley 56 (41); Sophia Smale 3/13 (17 balls) |

Oval Invincibles won by 39 runs
The Oval, London
Umpires: Rose Fernando and Surendiran Shanmugam
Player of the match: Marizanne Kapp (Oval Invincibles)

- Oval Invincibles won the toss and elected to bat.

Match 19
18 August 2025
15:00
Scorecard

| Southern Brave; 161/6 (100 balls) | v | Oval Invincibles; 72 (83 balls) |
| Laura Wolvaardt 36 (19); Phoebe Franklin 2/28 (20 balls) | | Amanda-Jade Wellington 18* (18); Mady Villiers 3/17 (20 balls) |

Southern Brave won by 89 runs
Rose Bowl, Southampton
Umpires: Anna Harris and Surendiran Shanmugam
Player of the match: Sophie Devine (Southern Brave)

- Oval Invincibles won the toss and elected to field.

Match 23
21 August 2025
15:00
Scorecard

| Oval Invincibles; 109/7 (100 balls) | v | Trent Rockets; 113/4 (84 balls) |
| Meg Lanning 45 (35); Ashleigh Gardner 2/10 (10 balls) | | Grace Scrivens 34 (27); Amanda-Jade Wellington 1/15 (20 balls) |

Trent Rockets won by 6 wickets
The Oval, London
Umpires: Gabi Brown and Chris Watts
Player of the match: Grace Scrivens (Trent Rockets)

- Trent Rockets won the toss and elected to field.

Match 25
23 August 2025
11:00
Scorecard

| Oval Invincibles; 125/6 (100 balls) | v | Northern Superchargers; 127/3 (95 balls) |
| Lauren Winfield-Hill 37 (30); Kate Cross 2/16 (20 balls) | | Alice Davidson-Richards 50 (32); Amanda-Jade Wellington 1/19 (20 balls) |

Northern Superchargers won by 7 wickets
Headingley, Leeds
Umpires: Hassan Adnan and James Middlebrook
Player of the match: Alice Davidson-Richards (Northern Superchargers)

- Oval Invincibles won the toss and elected to bat.

Match 29
25 August 2025
15:00
Scorecard

| Oval Invincibles; 108/8 (100 balls) | v | London Spirit; 112/2 (62 balls) |
| Marizanne Kapp 32 (25); Eva Gray 2/12 (20 balls); Charlie Dean 2/12 (20 balls) | | Kira Chathli 53 (29); Phoebe Franklin 2/10 (7 balls) |

London Spirit won by 8 wickets
The Oval, London
Umpires: Hassan Adnan and Rose Fernando
Player of the match: Charlie Dean (London Spirit)

- London Spirit won the toss and elected to field.

== Standings ==
=== Men ===
| Pos | Team | Pld | W | L | T | NR | Pts | NRR | Qualification |
|---|---|---|---|---|---|---|---|---|---|
| 1 | Oval Invincibles | 8 | 6 | 2 | 0 | 0 | 24 | 1.786 | Advanced to the Final |
| 2 | Trent Rockets | 8 | 6 | 2 | 0 | 0 | 24 | 0.393 | Advanced to the Eliminator |
| 3 | Northern Superchargers | 8 | 5 | 3 | 0 | 0 | 20 | 0.083 | Advanced to the Eliminator |
| 4 | Southern Brave | 8 | 4 | 4 | 0 | 0 | 16 | −0.223 | |
| 5 | Birmingham Phoenix | 8 | 3 | 5 | 0 | 0 | 12 | −0.211 | |
| 6 | Manchester Originals | 8 | 3 | 5 | 0 | 0 | 12 | −0.437 | |
| 7 | London Spirit | 8 | 3 | 5 | 0 | 0 | 12 | −0.701 | |
| 8 | Welsh Fire | 8 | 2 | 6 | 0 | 0 | 8 | −0.504 | |

Source: ESPNcricinfo

=== Women ===
| Pos | Team | Pld | W | L | NR | Pts | NRR | Qualification |
|---|---|---|---|---|---|---|---|---|
| 1 | Southern Brave | 8 | 8 | 0 | 0 | 32 | 1.164 | Advanced to the Final |
| 2 | Northern Superchargers | 8 | 6 | 2 | 0 | 24 | 1.216 | Advanced to the Eliminator |
| 3 | London Spirit | 8 | 5 | 3 | 0 | 20 | 0.500 | Advanced to the Eliminator |
| 4 | Trent Rockets | 8 | 4 | 4 | 0 | 16 | 0.115 | |
| 5 | Manchester Originals | 8 | 4 | 4 | 0 | 16 | −0.141 | |
| 6 | Oval Invincibles | 8 | 2 | 6 | 0 | 8 | −0.899 | |
| 7 | Birmingham Phoenix | 8 | 2 | 6 | 0 | 8 | −1.122 | |
| 8 | Welsh Fire | 8 | 1 | 7 | 0 | 4 | −0.830 | |

Source: ESPNcricinfo

== Knockout stages ==
=== Men ===
Final
31 August 2025
18:00 (D/N)
Scorecard

| Oval Invincibles; 168/5 (100 balls) | v | Trent Rockets; 142/8 |
| Will Jacks 72 (41); Marcus Stoinis 2/40 (20 balls) | | Marcus Stoinis 64 (38); Nathan Sowter 3/25 (20 balls) |

Invincibles won by 26 runs
Lord's, London
Umpires: Mike Burns and Michael Gough

- Oval Invincibles won the toss and elected to bat.
