= 2024 Oval Invincibles season =

Oval Invincibles
2024 season
- Coach: (Australia) Tom Moody (Men's team) (England) Jonathan Batty (Women's team)
- Captain: (England) Sam Billings (Men's team) (England) Lauren Winfield-Hill (Women's team)
- Overseas player: Mohammad Amir; Donovan Ferreira; Spencer Johnson; Adam Zampa; (Men's team); Chamari Athapaththu; Laura Harris; Marizanne Kapp; Megan Schutt; Amanda-Jade Wellington (Women's team)
- Ground(s): The Oval
- The Hundred (Men's): Winners
- The Hundred (Women's): 2nd
- Most runs: Jordan Cox 214 (Men's team); Alice Capsey 222 (Women's team)
- Most wickets: Adam Zampa 19 (Men's team); Marizanne Kapp 11 (Women's team)

The 2024 season was the Oval Invincibles' 4th season of the 100-ball cricket tournament, The Hundred. The men's team won their second consecutive title, while the women's team improved to finish second, losing out in the Eliminator round.

The men's victory meant that, for the fourth straight year since the tournament's inception, either the men's or the women's Invincibles were champions.

== Players ==
=== Men's side ===
The Invincibles men's squad retained eleven players from the previous season:

- Sam Curran (central contract)
- Tom Curran (£125k)
- Will Jacks (£125k)
- Adam Zampa (£100k)
- Jordan Cox (£100k)
- Gus Atkinson (£75k)
- Sam Billings (£75k)
- Saqib Mahmood (£60k)
- Spencer Johnson (£60k)
- Nathan Sowter (£50k)
- Tawanda Muyeye (£30k)

They drafted:

- Essex wicketkeeper-batsman Jordan Cox (£100k)
- Middlesex top order batter Dawid Malan (£50k)
- South Africa batter Donovan Ferreira (£40k)
- Somerset all-rounder Tom Lammonby (£40k)

Each franchise was allowed two wildcard picks. The Invincibles selected Gloucestershire's batter Marchant de Lange and Derbyshire's Scottish slow-left arm bowler Mark Watt.

S/N	Name	Nat.	Date of birth (age)	Batting style	Bowling style	Notes
Batters
9	Will Jacks	England	21 November 1998 (age 27)	Right-handed	Right-arm off break	
14	Tawanda Muyeye	Zimbabwe	5 March 2001 (age 25)	Right-handed	Right-arm off break	Domestic player
15	Tom Lammonby	England	2 June 2000 (age 26)	Left-handed	Left-arm medium	
22	Jordan Cox	England	21 October 2000 (age 25)	Right-handed	—	
29	Dawid Malan	England	3 September 1987 (age 38)	Left-handed	Right-arm leg break	
35	Harrison Ward	England	25 October 1999 (age 26)	Left-handed	Right-arm off break	Replacement player
All-rounders
2	Donovan Ferreira	South Africa	21 July 1998 (age 27)	Right-handed	Right-arm off break	Overseas player
58	Sam Curran	England	3 June 1998 (age 28)	Left-handed	Left-arm fast-medium	Centrally contracted player
59	Tom Curran	England	12 March 1995 (age 31)	Right-handed	Right-arm fast-medium	
Wicket-keepers
7	Sam Billings	England	15 June 1991 (age 35)	Right-handed	—	Captain
Pace bowlers
5	Mohammad Amir	Pakistan	13 April 1992 (aged 29)	Left-handed	Left-arm fast	Overseas player; Replacement player
21	Spencer Johnson	Australia	16 December 1995 (age 30)	Left-handed	Left-arm fast-medium	Overseas player
25	Saqib Mahmood	England	25 February 1997 (age 29)	Right-handed	Right-arm fast-medium	
37	Gus Atkinson	England	19 January 1998 (age 28)	Right-handed	Right-arm fast-medium	
90	Marchant de Lange	South Africa	13 October 1990 (age 35)	Right-handed	Right-arm fast	UK passport; Wildcard player
Spin bowlers
51	Mark Watt	Scotland	27 July 1996 (age 29)	Left-handed	Slow left-arm orthodox	Wildcard player
72	Nathan Sowter	Australia	12 October 1992 (age 33)	Right-handed	Right-arm leg break	UK passport
88	Adam Zampa	Australia	31 March 1992 (age 34)	Right-handed	Right-arm leg break	Overseas player

=== Women's side ===
S/N	Name	Nat.	Date of birth (age)	Batting style	Bowling style	Notes
Batters
4	Georgie Boyce	England	4 October 1998 (age 27)	Right-handed	Right-arm medium	
48	Laura Harris	Australia	18 August 1990 (age 35)	Right-handed	Slow left-arm orthodox	Overseas player; Replacement player
99	Chamari Athapaththu	Sri Lanka	9 February 1990 (age 36)	Left-handed	Right-arm off break	Overseas player
All-rounders
8	Paige Scholfield	England	19 December 1995 (age 30)	Right-handed	Right-arm medium	
14	Jo Gardner	England	25 March 1997 (age 29)	Right-handed	Right-arm off break	
26	Alice Capsey	England	11 August 2004 (age 21)	Right-handed	Right-arm off break	
Wicket-keepers
17	Amara Carr	England	17 April 1994 (age 32)	Right-handed	—	Wildcard player
58	Lauren Winfield-Hill	England	16 August 1990 (age 35)	Right-handed	—	Captain
Pace bowlers
2	Lizzie Scott	England	1 September 2004 (age 21)	Right-handed	Right-arm medium	
7	Marizanne Kapp	South Africa	4 January 1990 (age 36)	Right-handed	Right-arm medium	Overseas player
27	Megan Schutt	Australia	15 January 1993 (age 33)	Right-handed	Right-arm fast-medium	Overseas player; Replacement player
29	Ryana MacDonald-Gay	England	12 February 2004 (age 22)	Right-handed	Right-arm medium	
53	Tash Farrant	England	29 May 1996 (age 30)	Left-handed	Left-arm medium	Ruled out through injury
72	Rachel Slater	Scotland	20 November 2001 (age 24)	Right-handed	Left-arm medium	Wildcard player
Spin bowlers
10	Amanda-Jade Wellington	Australia	29 May 1997 (age 29)	Right-handed	Right-arm leg break	Overseas player
16	Sophia Smale	Wales	8 December 2004 (age 21)	Right-handed	Slow left-arm orthodox	
22	Mady Villiers	England	26 August 1998 (age 27)	Right-handed	Right-arm off break	

== League stage ==
=== Men's results ===
Match 1
23 July 2024
18:30 (N)
Scorecard

Birmingham Phoenix; 89 (81 balls)	v	Oval Invincibles; 93/2 (69 balls)
Rishi Patel 25 (24); Adam Zampa 3/11 (20 balls)		Sam Billings 31* (28); Tim Southee 2/20 (20 balls)

Oval Invincibles won by 8 wickets
The Oval, London
Umpires: Graham Lloyd (Eng) and Russell Warren (Eng)
Player of the match: Adam Zampa (Oval Invincibles)

- Birmingham Phoenix won the toss and elected to bat.

Match 6
28 July 2024
18:35 (N)
Scorecard

Oval Invincibles; 113/9 (100 balls)	v	Welsh Fire; 103/8 (100 balls)
Donovan Ferreira 30 (23); Jake Ball 3/24 (20 balls)		David Payne 28 (15); Adam Zampa 3/24 (20 balls)

Oval Invincibles won by 10 runs
Sophia Gardens, Cardiff
Umpires: Ian Blackwell (Eng) and Steve O'Shaughnessy (Eng)
Player of the match: Adam Zampa (Oval Invincibles)

- Welsh Fire won the toss and elected to field.

Match 12
2 August 2024
18:30 (N)
Scorecard

Northern Superchargers; 145/5 (100 balls)	v	Oval Invincibles; 126/9 (100 balls)
Nicholas Pooran 65* (41); Sam Curran 2/20 (15 balls)		Donovan Ferreira 49 (24); Matthew Potts 2/18 (20 balls)

Northern Superchargers won by 19 runs
The Oval, London
Umpires: Mike Burns (Eng) and Graham Lloyd (Eng)
Player of the match: Nicholas Pooran (Northern Superchargers)

- Oval Invincibles won the toss and elected to field.

Match 15
4 August 2024
14:30
Scorecard

Oval Invincibles; 147/5 (100 balls)	v	London Spirit; 117 (95 balls)
Sam Curran 51* (22); Matt Critchley 1/14 (15 balls)		Dan Lawrence 27 (18); Sam Curran 5/16 (20 balls)

Oval Invincibles won by 30 runs
Lord’s, London
Umpires: Mike Burns (Eng) and Stephen Harris (SA)
Player of the match: Sam Curran (Oval Invincibles)

- Oval Invincibles won the toss and elected to bat.

Match 18
6 August 2024
15:00
Scorecard

Oval Invincibles; 164/8 (100 balls)	v	Manchester Originals; 161/7 (100 balls)
Sam Curran 68 (38); Sikandar Raza 2/17 (20 balls)		Matthew Hurst 50 (29); Sam Curran 2/16 (15 balls)

Oval Invincibles won by 3 runs
Old Trafford, Manchester
Umpires: James Middlebrook (Eng) and Martin Saggers (Eng)
Player of the match: Sam Curran (Oval Invincibles)

- Manchester Originals won the toss and elected to field.

Match 22
8 August 2024
18:30 (N)
Scorecard

Southern Brave; 118/8 (100 balls)	v	Oval Invincibles; 120/4 (85 balls)
James Vince 52 (39); Tom Curran 4/24 (20 balls)		Jordan Cox 46* (29); Chris Jordan 1/14 (15 balls)

Oval Invincibles won by 6 wickets
The Oval, London
Umpires: Ben Debenham (Eng) and David Millns (Eng)
Player of the match: Sam Curran (Oval Invincibles)

- Oval Invincibles won the toss and elected to field.

Match 26
11 August 2024
14:30
Scorecard

London Spirit; 96 (92 balls)	v	Oval Invincibles; 100/1 (63 balls)
Michael Pepper 27 (18); Adam Zampa 4/17 (20 balls)		Jordan Cox 61* (30); Olly Stone 1/16 (15 balls)

Oval Invincibles won by 9 wickets
The Oval, London
Umpires: James Middlebrook (Eng) and Alex Wharf (Eng)
Player of the match: Adam Zampa (Oval Invincibles)

- Oval Invincibles won the toss and elected to field.

Match 31
14 August 2024
18:30 (N)
Scorecard

Oval Invincibles; 150/3 (100 balls)	v	Trent Rockets; 151/4 (94 balls)
Dawid Malan 53* (43); Sam Cook 2/23 (20 balls)		Rovman Powell 45 (27); Nathan Sowter 1/18 (15 balls)

Trent Rockets won by 6 wickets
Trent Bridge, Nottingham
Umpires: Ian Blackwell (Eng) and Tom Lungley (Eng)
Player of the match: Rovman Powell (Trent Rockets)

- Oval Invincibles won the toss and elected to bat.

=== Women's results ===
23 July 2024
14:45
Scorecard

Oval Invincibles; 150/5 (100 balls)	v	Birmingham Phoenix; 105 (92 balls)
Paige Scholfield 71 (40); Emily Arlott 2/19 (20 balls)		Amy Jones 21 (15); Amanda-Jade Wellington 3/9 (20 balls)

Oval Invincibles won by 45 runs
The Oval, London
Umpires: Anna Harris (Eng) and Sue Redfern (Eng)
Player of the match: Paige Scholfield (Oval Invincibles)

- Birmingham Phoenix won the toss and elected to field.

28 July 2024
15:00 (N)
Scorecard

Welsh Fire; 116/5 (100 balls)	v	Oval Invincibles; 118/4 (88 balls)
Sophia Dunkley 35 (26); Ryana MacDonald-Gay 2/20 (20 balls)		Alice Capsey 59 (48); Georgia Davis 3/33 (20 balls)

Oval Invincibles won by 6 wickets
Sophia Gardens, Cardiff
Umpires: Sophie McLelland (Eng) and Mark Newell (Eng)
Player of the match: Alice Capsey (Oval Invincibles)

- Welsh Fire won the toss and elected to bat.

2 August 2024
15:00
Scorecard

Northern Superchargers; 146/4 (100 balls)	v	Oval Invincibles; 64 (66 balls)
Annabel Sutherland 63* (40); Rachel Slater 2/11 (15 balls)		Amanda-Jade Wellington 26 (21); Annabel Sutherland 4/11 (16 balls)

Northern Superchargers won by 82 runs
The Oval, London
Umpires: Hassan Adnan (Eng) and Stephen Harris (SA)
Player of the match: Annabel Sutherland (Northern Superchargers)

- Oval Invincibles won the toss and elected to field.

4 August 2024
11:00
Scorecard

London Spirit; 113/9 (100 balls)	v	Oval Invincibles; 113/8 (100 balls)
Deepti Sharma 44 (34); Marizanne Kapp 4/11 (20 balls)		Marizanne Kapp 47 (32); Deepti Sharma 3/18 (20 balls)

Match tied
Lord’s, London
Umpires: Rose Dovey (Eng) and Chris Watts (Eng)
Player of the match: Marizanne Kapp (Oval Invincibles)

- Oval Invincibles won the toss and elected to field.

6 August 2024
11:30
Scorecard

Manchester Originals; 125/4 (100 balls)	v	Oval Invincibles; 127/3 (93 balls)
Laura Wolvaardt 38 (29); Amanda-Jade Wellington 2/22 (20 balls)		Paige Scholfield 48* (27); Alice Monaghan 2/7 (10 balls)

Oval Invincibles won by 7 wickets
Old Trafford, Manchester
Umpires: Jasmine Naeem (Eng) and Jack Shantry (Eng)
Player of the match: Paige Scholfield (Oval Invincibles)

- Manchester Originals won the toss and elected to bat.

8 August 2024
15:00
Scorecard

Oval Invincibles; 79/4 (65 balls)	v	Southern Brave; 85/3 (64 balls)
Marizanne Kapp 26* (17); Lauren Cheatle 2/6 (15 balls)		Danni Wyatt 46* (37); Ryana MacDonald-Gay 1/7 (15 balls)

Southern Brave won by 7 wickets (DLS method)
The Oval, London
Umpires: Joanne Ibbotson (Eng) and Chris Watts (Eng)
Player of the match: Danni Wyatt (Southern Brave)

- Southern Brave won the toss and elected to field.
- The match was reduced to 65 balls per side due to rain.
- Southern Brave were set a revised target of 83 runs from 65 balls due to rain.

11 August 2024
11:00
Scorecard

London Spirit; 120/8 (100 balls)	v	Oval Invincibles; 121/2 (91 balls)
Deepti Sharma 46* (30); Sophia Smale 2/25 (15 balls)		Lauren Winfield-Hill 61* (40); Danielle Gibson 1/19 (16 balls)

Oval Invincibles won by 8 wickets
The Oval, London
Umpires: Rose Dovey (Eng) and David Millns (Eng)
Player of the match: Lauren Winfield-Hill (Oval Invincibles)

- Oval Invincibles won the toss and elected to field.

14 August 2024
15:00
Scorecard

Trent Rockets; 91/8 (100 balls)	v	Oval Invincibles; 92/5 (94 balls)
Ashleigh Gardner 43 (26); Marizanne Kapp 3/8 (20 balls)		Marizanne Kapp 26* (24); Ashleigh Gardner 2/23 (19 balls)

Oval Invincibles won by 5 wickets
Trent Bridge, Nottingham
Umpires: Sophie McLelland (Eng) and Neil Pratt (Eng)
Player of the match: Marizanne Kapp (Oval Invincibles)

- Oval Invincibles won the toss and elected to field.

== Standings ==
=== Men ===
Pos	Team	Pld	W	L	T	NR	Pts	NRR	Qualification
1	Oval Invincibles	8	6	2	0	0	12	0.893	Advanced to the Final
2	Birmingham Phoenix	8	6	2	0	0	12	0.402	Advanced to the Eliminator
3	Southern Brave	8	5	2	0	1	11	0.595	Advanced to the Eliminator
4	Northern Superchargers	8	5	2	0	1	11	−0.453	
5	Trent Rockets	8	4	4	0	0	8	0.348	
6	Welsh Fire	8	2	4	0	2	6	−0.215	
7	Manchester Originals	8	1	7	0	0	2	−0.886	
8	London Spirit	8	1	7	0	0	2	−0.975	

Source: ESPN Cricinfo

=== Women ===
Pos	Team	Pld	W	L	T	NR	Pts	NRR	Qualification
1	Welsh Fire	8	5	2	0	1	11	0.334	Advanced to the Final
2	Oval Invincibles	8	5	2	1	0	11	0.034	Advanced to the Eliminator
3	London Spirit	8	4	3	1	0	9	0.080	Advanced to the Eliminator
4	Northern Superchargers	8	3	3	1	1	8	0.942	
5	Trent Rockets	8	4	4	0	0	8	0.407	
6	Manchester Originals	8	3	4	0	1	7	−0.398	
7	Birmingham Phoenix	8	3	4	0	1	7	−0.742	
8	Southern Brave	8	1	6	1	0	3	−0.675	

Source: ESPNcricinfo

== Knockout stages ==
=== Men ===
Having topped the table, the men's team went straight to the final where they met the Southern Brave. Will Curran Jacks with the bat, hitting 37 from 22 balls in the Invincibiles total of 147/9, before Saqib Mahmood's 3/17 restricted the Brave to 130/7.

18 August 2024
18:00 (N)
Scorecard

Oval Invincibles; 147/9 (100 balls)	v	Southern Brave; 130/7 (100 balls)
Will Jacks 37 (22); Tymal Mills 3/33 (20 balls)		Alex Davies 35 (23); Saqib Mahmood 3/17 (20 balls)

Oval Invincibles won by 17 runs
Lord's, London
Umpires: Martin Saggers (Eng) and Russell Warren (Eng)
Player of the match: Saqib Mahmood (Oval Invincibles)

- Southern Brave won the toss and elected to field.

=== Women ===
The women's team were knocked out in the Eliminator by local rivals London Spirit.

17 August 2024
14:15
Scorecard

Oval Invincibles; 113/9 (100 balls)	v	London Spirit; 116/2 (91 balls)
Alice Capsey 30 (33); Charlie Dean 3/24 (20 balls)		Georgia Redmayne 53* (47); Marizanne Kapp 1/19 (20 balls)

London Spirit won by 8 wickets
The Oval, London
Umpires: Mark Newell (Eng) and Rose Dovey (Eng)
Player of the match: Georgia Redmayne (London Spirit)

- London Spirit won the toss and elected to field.
