= List of MI London cricketers =

MI London, formerly the Oval Invincibles, were formed in 2019, and played their first Hundred match in the 2021 season of The Hundred against Manchester Originals for both the Men's team and the Women's team. Hundred matches are classed as Twenty20 matches and so have Twenty20 status or Women's Twenty20 status. The players in this list have all played at least one Hundred match for the MI London Men's or Women's team.

Players are listed in order of appearance, where players made their debut in the same match, they are ordered by batting order. Players in Bold were overseas players for the Oval Invincibles.

== Key ==
**General**

- ♠ – Captain
- † – Wicket-keeper
- **First** – Year of debut for Oval Invincibles
- **Last** – Year of latest match played for Oval Invincibles
- **Mat** – Number of matches played for Oval Invincibles
- **Win%** – Winning percentage

**Batting**

- **Inn** – Number of innings batted
- **NO** – Number of innings not out
- **Runs** – Runs scored in career
- **HS** – Highest score
- **100** – Centuries scored
- **50** – Half-centuries scored
- **Avg** – Runs scored per dismissal
- * – Batsman remained not out

**Bowling**

- **Balls** – Balls bowled in career
- **Wkt** – Wickets taken in career
- **BBI** – Best bowling in an innings
- **BBM** – Best bowling in a match
- **Ave** – Average runs per wicket

**Fielding**

- **Ca** – Catches taken
- **St** – Stumpings effected

== List of players ==
=== Women's players ===
No.	Name	Nationality	First	Last	Mat	Runs	HS	Avg	Balls	Wkt	BBI	Ave	Ca	St
No.	Name	Nationality	First	Last	Mat	Batting			Bowling				Fielding	
1	Georgia Adams	England	2021	2021	10	133	42	16.62	0	0	–	–	2	0
2	Alice Capsey	England	2021	2025	59	793	59	22.66	352	22	3/15	18.77	19	0
3	Grace Gibbs	England	2021	2021	10	46	21	15.33	40	2	2/24	30.00	6	0
4	Fran Wilson	England	2021	2021	10	108	25	12.00	0	0	–	–	0	0
5	**Dane van Niekerk** ♠	South Africa	2021	2023	15	324	67*	40.50	165	8	3/30	23.00	8	0
6	**Marizanne Kapp**	South Africa	2021	2025	33	797	64*	39.85	603	46	4/9	13.48	7	0
7	Mady Villiers	England	2021	2024	33	129	22*	8.60	407	20	4/12	25.30	10	0
8	Sarah Bryce †	Scotland	2021	2021	10	32	29	16.00	0	0	–	–	8	3
9	Tash Farrant	England	2021	2025	16	8	4	2.66	269	24	4/10	13.91	4	0
10	**Shabnim Ismail**	South Africa	2021	2022	14	5	5	5.00	255	8	2/12	32.87	2	0
11	Danielle Gregory	England	2021	2026	10	4	3	4.00	80	1	1/18	112.00	2	0
12	Jo Gardner	England	2021	2025	26	86	19*	12.00	2	0	–	–	9	0
13	Eva Gray	England	2021	2023	17	21	16*	7.00	198	13	2/10	17.84	2	0
14	Lauren Winfield-Hill ♠†	England	2022	2025	31	587	74*	21.74	0	0	–	–	7	9
15	**Suzie Bates** ♠	New Zealand	2022	2023	14	367	79*	28.23	0	0	–	–	9	0
16	Kira Chathli †	England	2022	2026	18	69	31	7.67	0	0	–	–	3	4
17	Kirstie White	England	2022	2022	3	10	9	10.00	0	0	–	–	1	0
18	Ryana MacDonald-Gay	England	2022	2025	26	24	19*	4.80	345	23	4/16	20.04	8	0
19	Sophia Smale	Wales	2022	2025	31	21	7	5.25	498	27	3/13	23.11	11	0
20	Aylish Cranstone	England	2022	2022	1	18	18	18.00	0	0	–	–	0	0
21	Emily Windsor	England	2022	2022	4	13	13*	–	0	0	–	–	1	0
22	Paige Scholfield	England	2023	2025	24	355	71	15.43	120	8	3/30	20.37	12	0
23	Lizzie Scott	England	2023	2023	1	7	7*	–	5	0	–	–	0	0
24	Cordelia Griffith	England	2023	2023	6	64	30*	16.00	0	0	–	–	1	0
25	**Nadine de Klerk**	South Africa	2023	2023	2	56	51*	56.00	35	2	1/20	27.50	0	0
26	**Laura Harris**	Australia	2024	2024	3	20	16	6.66	0	0	–	–	0	0
27	**Amanda-Jade Wellington**	Australia	2024	2025	17	106	26	13.25	285	17	3/9	21.53	5	0
28	Rachel Slater	Scotland	2024	2025	10	0	0	0.00	110	5	2/11	26.00	1	0
29	**Chamari Athapaththu**	Sri Lanka	2024	2024	6	66	33	11.00	0	0	–	–	0	0
30	**Meg Lanning**	Australia	2025	2025	8	287	85	35.88	0	0	–	–	4	0
31	Phoebe Franklin	England	2025	2025	8	14	8*	7.00	57	6	2/10	15.67	4	0
32	Daisy Gibb	England	2025	2025	2	1	1	1.00	10	0	–	–	0	0
33	Kalea Moore	England	2025	2026	6	3	3*	3.00	34	1	1/26	45.00	0	0
34	Ellie Anderson	England	2025	2025	1	–	–	–	15	0	–	–	0	0
35	**Hayley Matthews**	West Indies	2026	2026	8	126	33	15.75	129	10	4/22	20.00	0	0
36	Danni Wyatt-Hodge	England	2026	2026	3	93	52*	46.50	0	0	–	–	0	0
37	**Amelia Kerr**	New Zealand	2026	2026	8	173	69*	34.60	145	6	2/21	31.33	4	0
38	**Nicola Carey**	Australia	2026	2026	8	53	17	8.83	129	4	2/30	47.75	2	0
39	Hollie Armitage ♠	England	2026	2026	8	121	31	15.12	0	0	–	–	3	0
40	**Chinelle Henry**	West Indies	2026	2026	8	178	42	29.66	65	1	1/14	100.00	3	0
41	Alice Monaghan	England	2026	2026	7	59	27*	11.80	0	0	–	–	2	0
42	Alice Davidson-Richards	England	2026	2026	6	31	17	6.20	0	0	–	–	3	0
43	Kirstie Gordon	Scotland	2026	2026	6	3	3	1.50	94	7	2/14	18.28	0	0
44	Alexa Stonehouse	England	2026	2026	5	4	2*	–	35	2	1/3	24.50	0	0
45	Tara Norris	United States	2026	2026	6	0	0	0.00	85	4	1/16	27.75	2	0

=== Men's players ===
No.	Name	Nationality	First	Last	Mat	Runs	HS	Avg	Balls	Wkt	BBI	Ave	Ca	St
No.	Name	Nationality	First	Last	Mat	Batting			Bowling				Fielding	
1	Jason Roy ♠	England	2021	2026	27	444	59	18.50	0	0	–	–	11	0
2	Sam Curran ♠	England	2021	2026	44	975	72	27.85	752	51	5/16	21.58	20	0
3	**Sunil Narine**	West Indies	2021	2023	19	145	23	14.50	345	24	3/11	16.54	2	0
4	Will Jacks	England	2021	2026	50	1,328	108*	27.66	235	15	2/8	18.93	23	0
5	Sam Billings ♠†	England	2021	2025	42	494	76*	19.76	0	0	–	–	25	6
6	**Colin Ingram**	South Africa	2021	2021	8	120	81*	20.00	0	0	–	–	4	0
7	Laurie Evans	England	2021	2021	8	123	67*	41.00	0	0	–	–	5	0
8	Tom Curran	England	2021	2026	44	478	67*	31.86	742	47	4/15	24.85	13	0
9	Nathan Sowter	Australia	2021	2026	39	24	7*	4.80	541	32	3/25	23.15	20	0
10	Saqib Mahmood	England	2021	2025	18	15	7*	15.00	297	19	3/17	22.68	3	0
11	Reece Topley	England	2021	2022	12	0	0*	–	184	9	3/24	31.88	1	0
12	Jordan Clark	England	2021	2025	7	5	5	2.50	30	2	2/8	20.50	2	0
13	**Tabraiz Shamsi**	South Africa	2021	2021	6	–	–	–	115	7	3/25	23.85	0	0
14	Alex Blake	England	2021	2021	3	54	44*	27.00	0	0	–	–	2	0
15	Jordan Cox †	England	2022	2025	29	940	86*	49.47	0	0	–	–	21	0
16	**Hilton Cartwright**	Australia	2022	2022	5	62	42	20.66	0	0	–	–	6	0
17	Danny Briggs	England	2022	2023	6	32	29*	32.00	50	3	2/22	26.33	0	0
18	**Mohammad Hasnain**	Pakistan	2022	2022	5	11	11*	–	70	6	2/28	21.66	0	0
19	**Rilee Rossouw**	South Africa	2022	2022	6	70	24	11.66	0	0	–	–	3	0
20	Matt Milnes	England	2022	2022	6	4	4	2.00	84	5	3/32	28.20	4	0
21	Jack Haynes	England	2022	2022	1	2	2	2.00	0	0	–	–	1	0
22	Pat Brown	England	2022	2022	1	–	–	–	5	0	–	–	0	0
23	**Peter Hatzoglou**	Australia	2022	2022	2	1	1*	–	35	2	1/29	30.00	0	0
24	**Heinrich Klaasen**	South Africa	2023	2023	7	189	60	31.50	0	0	–	–	3	0
25	Gus Atkinson	England	2023	2025	8	3	3*	–	134	10	3/24	22.40	1	0
26	Zak Chappell	England	2023	2023	4	0	0	0.00	55	6	4/33	16.16	0	0
27	Ross Whiteley	England	2023	2023	6	38	35	9.50	0	0	–	–	5	0
28	**Spencer Johnson**	Australia	2023	2024	12	2	1*	2.00	205	7	3/1	36.71	3	0
29	Tawanda Muyeye	Zimbabwe	2023	2025	14	231	59*	19.25	0	0	–	–	4	0
30	**Adam Zampa**	Australia	2023	2025	13	5	3*	5.00	260	26	4/17	11.80	3	0
31	**James Neesham**	New Zealand	2023	2023	2	61	57*	61.00	0	0	–	–	0	0
32	**Paul Stirling**	Ireland	2023	2023	1	5	5	5.00	0	0	–	–	0	0
33	Dawid Malan	England	2024	2024	9	189	53*	31.50	0	0	–	–	4	0
34	**Donovan Ferreira**	South Africa	2024	2025	18	303	63	30.30	0	0	–	–	12	0
35	Tom Lammonby	England	2024	2024	8	25	16	8.33	0	0	–	–	5	0
36	**Mohammad Amir**	Pakistan	2024	2024	1	–	–	–	15	2	2/7	3.50	0	0
37	**Rashid Khan**	Afghanistan	2025	2026	11	27	16	13.50	215	19	5/17	15.00	6	0
38	**Jason Behrendorff**	Australia	2025	2025	9	–	–	–	145	10	3/20	18.10	1	0
39	Miles Hammond	England	2025	2025	1	–	–	–	0	0	–	–	0	0
40	James Vince ♠	England	2026	2026	8	178	66	22.25	0	0	–	–	2	0
41	**Nicholas Pooran** †	West Indies	2026	2026	8	208	58*	29.75	0	0	–	–	9	1
42	**Josh Philippe**	Australia	2026	2026	1	–	–	–	0	0	–	–	0	0
43	**Trent Boult**	New Zealand	2026	2026	1	1	1*	–	159	9	2/15	23.66	0	0
44	Richard Gleeson	England	2026	2026	8	–	–	–	139	14	4/25	16.85	1	0
45	**Sherfane Rutherford**	West Indies	2026	2026	6	91	41	18.20	0	0	–	–	3	0
46	Ollie Pope	England	2026	2026	5	19	8	19.00	0	0	–	–	1	0
47	Olly Stone	England	2026	2026	1	–	–	–	15	1	1/39	39.00	0	0
48	**Sikandar Raza**	Zimbabwe	2026	2026	3	65	32	21.66	30	1	1/16	38.00	1	0
49	Ollie Sykes	England	2026	2026	1	23	23*	–	0	0	–	–	1	0

== See also ==
- MI London
- The Hundred
