= MI London =

100-ball cricket side in Kennington, London

Personnel
- Captain: Hollie Armitage (women); Sam Curran (men)
- Coach: Lisa Keightley (women); Kieron Pollard (men)
- Overseas players: Nicola Carey; Chinelle Henry; Amelia Kerr; Hayley Matthews; (women); Trent Boult; Josh Philippe; Nicholas Pooran; Rashid Khan; Sherfane Rutherford; Sikandar Raza; (men)
- Owner: Surrey Cricket Club 51%, Reliance Strategic Business Ventures Limited 49%

Team information
- Colours
- Founded: 2019; 7 years ago
- Home ground: The Oval
- Capacity: 25,500

History
- No. of titles: 5
- Men's titles wins: 3 (2023, 2024, 2025)
- Women's titles wins: 2 (2021, 2022)
- Official website: Oval Invincibles
The Hundred kit

MI London, formerly known as Oval Invincibles, is a 100-ball cricket franchise based in South London. The team represents Surrey and Kent in The Hundred competition, which took place for the first time during the 2021 English cricket season. Both the men's side and the women's side play at The Oval.

== History ==
Logo used from 2019 to 2025

By 2019, it had been announced that there would be a Hundred franchise affiliated to Surrey and Kent. The home ground was also established as the Oval, despite rumours that Surrey's decision to vote against the Hundred's new playing conditions had led Colin Graves to threaten to take away their hosting rights.

However, as late as May 2019, the franchise's name was still undecided. After previous speculation that teams would have no geographical element, it was now suggested the Oval franchise would contain the word "London", like the Lord's-based London Spirit.

In June, The Times contradicted this rumour, reporting that the team would be called the Oval Greats, after several other ECB proposals – London Fuse, London X, London Union and London Rebels – had been rejected. All such notions were disproved in July when the team's name was announced as the Oval Invincibles.

In August 2019, the side announced that Australian coach Tom Moody would be the men's team's first coach, while former England Women player Lydia Greenway was appointed coach of the Women's team.

The inaugural Hundred draft took place in October 2019 and saw the Invincibles claim Sam Curran as their headline men's draftee. He was joined by Surrey and England teammates Tom Curran and Jason Roy, along with five other Surrey players. Laura Marsh was the women's marquee signing, alongside Fran Wilson.

The first season did not take place until 2021 due to the COVID-19 pandemic. The women's team immediately achieved success by winning the first women's Hundred title. They retained the title the following year, beating Southern Brave in the final for the second consecutive time.

Having finished in mid-table for the first two seasons, the men's side saw a significant change of fortune in 2023. They won their first title in their third season, beating Manchester Originals in the final. They retained the title in 2024 with victory over Southern Brave, and won it a third time in 2025 by defeating Trent Rockets. This run of success means either the women's or men's team have won a title in every edition of the Hundred to date.

As part of the 2025 Hundred sale, the ECB granted Surrey County Cricket Club a 51% stake in the franchise, with the remaining 49% sold through an auction process. Reliance Industries Limited acquired the 49% share through their subsidiary Reliance Strategic Business Ventures Limited, while Surrey County Cricket Club retained its stake.

The sale of the Invincibles was completed in December 2025, with both parties agreeing to rebrand as MI London from the 2026 season. For Reliance, the purchase adds to their "MI" portfolio, which also includes teams in India, South Africa, the UAE, and the US.

== Ground ==
Both the men's and women's teams play at the home of Surrey, The Oval, in the Kennington area of London.

The women's side had been due to play at the County Ground in Beckenham, one of the outgrounds of Kent County Cricket Club, but both teams were brought together at the same location as a result of the COVID-19 pandemic.

== Honours ==
=== Men's honours ===
The Hundred

- Winners: 2023, 2024, 2025

=== Women's honours ===
The Hundred

- Winners: 2021, 2022
- Third place: 2024

== Current squads ==
- **Bold** denotes players with international caps
- * denotes a player who is unavailable for rest of the season

=== Women's side ===
No.	Name	Nationality	Date of birth (age)	Batting style	Bowling style	Notes
Batters
28	**Danni Wyatt-Hodge**	England	22 April 1991 (age 35)	Right-handed	Right-arm off break	England central contract; Ruled out through injury
57	**Hollie Armitage**	England	14 June 1997 (age 29)	Right-handed	Right-arm leg break	Captain
All-rounders
13	Francesca Sweet	England	15 June 2004 (age 22)	Right-handed	Right-arm medium	Wildcard player
16	**Nicola Carey**	Australia	10 September 1993 (age 33)	Left-handed	Right-arm medium	Overseas player
17	**Chinelle Henry**	West Indies	17 August 1995 (age 31)	Right-handed	Right-arm medium	Overseas player
24	**Alice Davidson-Richards**	England	29 May 1994 (age 32)	Right-handed	Right-arm medium	
48	**Amelia Kerr**	New Zealand	13 October 2000 (age 25)	Right-handed	Right-arm leg break	Overseas player
50	**Hayley Matthews**	West Indies	19 March 1998 (age 28)	Right-handed	Right-arm off break	Overseas player
66	Alice Monaghan	England	20 March 2000 (age 26)	Right-handed	Right-arm medium	
Wicket-keepers
20	Kira Chathli	England	29 July 1999 (age 27)	Right-handed	—	
21	Ellie Threlkeld	England	16 November 1998 (age 27)	Right-handed	—	
33	**Ella Claridge**	United States	28 September 2002 (age 24)	Right-handed	Right-arm medium	UK passport; Replacement player
Pace bowlers
11	Kate Coppack	England	30 August 1994 (age 32)	Right-handed	Right-arm medium	Wildcard player
12	Alexa Stonehouse	England	5 December 2004 (age 21)	Right-handed	Left-arm medium	
22	**Tara Norris**	United States	4 June 1998 (age 28)	Left-handed	Left-arm medium	UK passport
Spin bowlers
9	Kalea Moore	England	27 March 2003 (age 23)	Right-handed	Right-arm off break	
19	Danielle Gregory	England	4 December 1998 (age 27)	Right-handed	Right-arm leg break	
34	**Kirstie Gordon**	Scotland (Note: Gordon has also played international cricket for England.)	20 October 1997 (age 28)	Right-handed	Slow left-arm orthodox	

=== Men's side ===
No.	Name	Nationality	Date of birth (age)	Batting style	Bowling style	Notes
Batters
14	**James Vince**	England	14 March 1991 (age 35)	Right-handed	Right-arm medium	
20	**Jason Roy**	England	21 July 1990 (age 36)	Right-handed	Right-arm medium	
32	**Ollie Pope**	England	2 January 1998 (age 28)	Right-handed	—	England central contract
54	Ollie Sykes	England	6 March 2005 (age 21)	Left-handed	Right-arm medium	
68	**Sherfane Rutherford**	West Indies	15 August 1998 (age 28)	Left-handed	Right-arm medium	Overseas player
All-rounders
9	**Will Jacks**	England	21 November 1998 (age 27)	Right-handed	Right-arm off break	England central contract
24	**Sikandar Raza**	Zimbabwe	24 April 1986 (age 40)	Right-handed	Right-arm off break	Overseas player; Replacement player
58	**Sam Curran**	England	3 June 1998 (age 28)	Left-handed	Left-arm fast-medium	Captain; England central contract
59	**Tom Curran**	England	12 March 1995 (age 31)	Right-handed	Right-arm fast-medium	
Wicket-keepers
22	**Josh Philippe**	Australia	1 June 1997 (age 29)	Right-handed	—	Overseas player; Replacement player
29	**Nicholas Pooran**	West Indies	2 October 1995 (age 31)	Left-handed	Right-arm off break	Overseas player
Pace bowlers
16	Sebastian Morgan	England	30 August 2007 (age 19)	Right-handed	Right-arm fast-medium	Wildcard player
18	**Trent Boult**	New Zealand	22 July 1989 (age 37)	Right-handed	Left-arm fast-medium	Overseas player
26	**Olly Stone**	England	9 October 1993 (age 32)	Right-handed	Right-arm fast	
33	**Richard Gleeson**	England	2 December 1987 (age 38)	Right-handed	Right-arm fast-medium	
91	Eddie Jack	England	9 September 2005 (age 21)	Left-handed	Right-arm fast-medium	Wildcard player
Spin bowlers
17	Callum Parkinson	England	24 October 1996 (age 29)	Right-handed	Slow left-arm orthodox	
19	**Rashid Khan**	Afghanistan	20 September 1998 (age 28)	Right-handed	Right-arm leg break	Overseas player; Ruled out
72	Nathan Sowter	Australia	12 October 1992 (age 33)	Right-handed	Right-arm leg break	UK passport

== Seasons ==
=== Women's team ===
Season	Group stage							Playoff stage		Ref.
Season	Pld	W	L	T	NR	Pts	Pos	Pld	Pos	Ref.
2021	8	4	3	0	1	9	2nd	2 (Note: Oval Invincibles women qualified for the eliminator in 2021. They played two matches, winning the playoff for the final against Birmingham Phoenix by 20 runs, winning the final against Southern Brave by 48 runs.)	1st	
2022	6	5	1	0	0	10	1st	1 (Note: Oval Invincibles women qualified for the final in 2022. In the final they played against Southern Brave, winning by 5 wickets.)	1st	
2023	8	3	4	0	1	7	5th	Did not progress		
2024	8	5	2	1	0	11	2nd	1 (Note: Oval Invincibles women qualified for the eliminator in 2024. They played 1 game, losing the eliminator against London Spirit by 8 wickets.)	3rd	
2025	8	2	6	0	0	8	6th	Did not progress		
2026	8	1	6	1	0	6	8th	Did not progress		

=== Men's team ===
Season	Group stage							Playoff stage		Ref.
Season	Pld	W	L	T	NR	Pts	Pos	Pld	Pos	Ref.
2021	8	4	3	0	1	9	4th	Did not progress		
2022	8	4	4	0	0	8	5th	Did not progress		
2023	8	6	1	1	0	13	1st	1 (Note: Oval Invincibles men qualified for the final in 2023. In the final they played against Manchester Originals, winning by 14 runs.)	1st	
2024	8	6	2	0	0	12	1st	1 (Note: Oval Invincibles men qualified for the final in 2024. In the final they played against Southern Brave, winning by 17 runs.)	1st	
2025	8	6	2	0	0	24	1st	1	1st	
2026	8	5	3	0	0	20	4th	Did not progress		

== See also ==
- List of MI London cricketers
- List of cricket grounds in England and Wales
- List of Test cricket grounds
