= Sue Redfern =

English cricketer and umpire (born 1977)

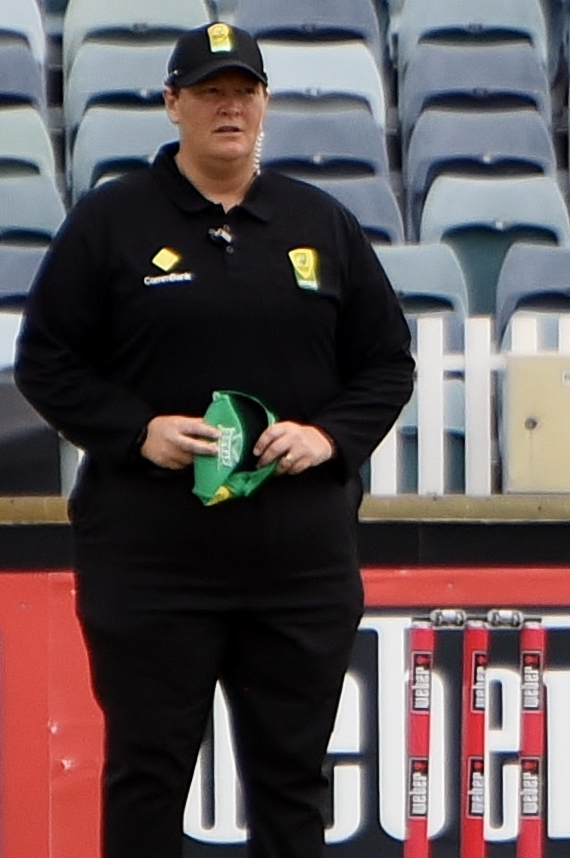
- Redfern umpiring during WBBL|08 in October 2022

Personal information
- Full name: Suzanne Redfern
- Born: 26 October 1977 (age 49); Mansfield, Nottinghamshire, England
- Batting: Left-handed
- Bowling: Left-arm medium
- Role: Bowler, umpire

International information
- National side: England
- Test debut (cap 119): 24 November 1995 v India
- Last Test: 15 July 1999 v India
- ODI debut (cap 66): 18 July 1995 v Netherlands
- Last ODI: 11 July 1999 v India

Domestic team information
- Years: Team
- 1992–1996: East Midlands
- 1997–2001: Derbyshire
- 2003–2008: Staffordshire

Umpiring information
- WTests umpired: 4 (2021–present)
- WODIs umpired: 45 (2017–present)
- WT20Is umpired: 77 (2018–present)
- FC umpired: 18 (2023–present)
- LA umpired: 12 (2022–present)
- T20 umpired: 8 (2023–present)

Career statistics
Competition	WTest	WODI	WFC	WLA
Matches	6	15	9	92
Runs scored	146	31	231	1,468
Batting average	29.20	15.50	23.0	27.18
100s/50s	0/0	0/0	0/0	1/7
Top score	30	27	30	125
Balls bowled	858	615	1,140	3,321
Wickets	6	16	9	75
Bowling average	64.50	18.18	55.88	20.52
5 wickets in innings	0	0	0	0
10 wickets in match	0	0	0	0
Best bowling	2/27	4/21	2/27	4/18
Catches/stumpings	5/–	3/–	6/–	32/6
- Source: Cricinfo, 05 October 2026

Suzanne 'Sue' Redfern MBE (born 26 October 1977) is an English cricket umpire and former cricketer. She played for the England women's team between 1995 and 1999, including at the 1997 World Cup.

== Cricket career ==
Born in Mansfield, Nottinghamshire, Redfern began her county career with East Midlands in 1992, switching to Derbyshire in 1997 and Staffordshire in 2003, finally retiring after the 2008 season. Her international career began in July 1995, at the age of 17, when she played European Championship matches against the Netherlands, Denmark, and Ireland. Her Test debut came later in the year, against India. Redfern's best performance for England came in a five-match One Day International (ODI) series against South Africa in August 1997. She was named player of the series, having taken nine wickets at an average of just 10.44, including 4/21 from ten overs in the first fixture.

At the 1997 World Cup in India, Redfern played in only four of her team's seven matches, taking three wickets. Her final matches for England came at the age of 21, in July 1999, when she played a single Test and a single ODI against India.

== Umpiring career ==
After retiring as a cricketer, Redfern took up umpiring, initially standing only in local competitions. In July 2015, she was part of the umpiring team for an ODI between Australia and England (part of the 2014–16 ICC Women's Championship), serving as fourth umpire. Later in the year, it was announced that she would stand at the 2015 World Twenty20 Qualifier in Thailand.

During the 2016 ICC World Cricket League Division Five tournament in Jersey, she was one of the on-field umpires during the fixture between Oman and Nigeria on 22 May. Her colleague, Jacqueline Williams, was the third umpire, making it the first time that two female umpires had officiated in a men's match in an ICC tournament.

In January 2017, she was one of four female umpires named by the ICC to stand in matches in the 2017 Women's Cricket World Cup Qualifier. She became the first woman to have played in a Women's Cricket World Cup and then stand in a tournament as an umpire.

In October 2018, she was named as one of the twelve on-field umpires for the 2018 ICC Women's World Twenty20. In May 2019, the International Cricket Council named her as one of the eight women on the ICC Development Panel of Umpires. In August 2019, she was named as one of the umpires to officiate in matches during the 2019 ICC Women's World Twenty20 Qualifier tournament in Scotland. In February 2020, the ICC named her as one of the umpires to officiate in matches during the 2020 ICC Women's T20 World Cup in Australia. In June 2021 she was fourth umpire for the first match of the three match T20I series between England and Sri Lanka men, played at Cardiff, becoming the first woman to officiate an England men's home match.

In July 2021, she was an on field umpire in the inaugural game of The Hundred (cricket) in the Oval Invincibles vs Manchester Originals women's teams. In February 2022, she was named as one of the on-field umpires for the 2022 Women's Cricket World Cup in New Zealand.

She was named in 2022 as a member of the ECB's Professional Umpires' Team, meaning that she would become the first woman to umpire in men's first-class cricket in England. In 2023 she was still the only woman to umpire in men's first-class cricket in England, receiving a significantly higher fee than when umpiring in women's cricket. She was also the only woman umpire to be a full-time employee of the ECB, paid around £40,000 annually plus match fees; all other women umpires are classed as self-employed with an annual retainer of £2,500- £4,000 and paid substantially lower match fees.

In September 2023 she became the first female umpire to stand in a first-class match in England and Wales. She umpired in the match between Glamorgan and Derbyshire at Sophia Gardens.

In September 2024 she was named as part of an all-female officiating group for the 2024 ICC Women's T20 World Cup.
