= Alice Capsey =

English cricketer

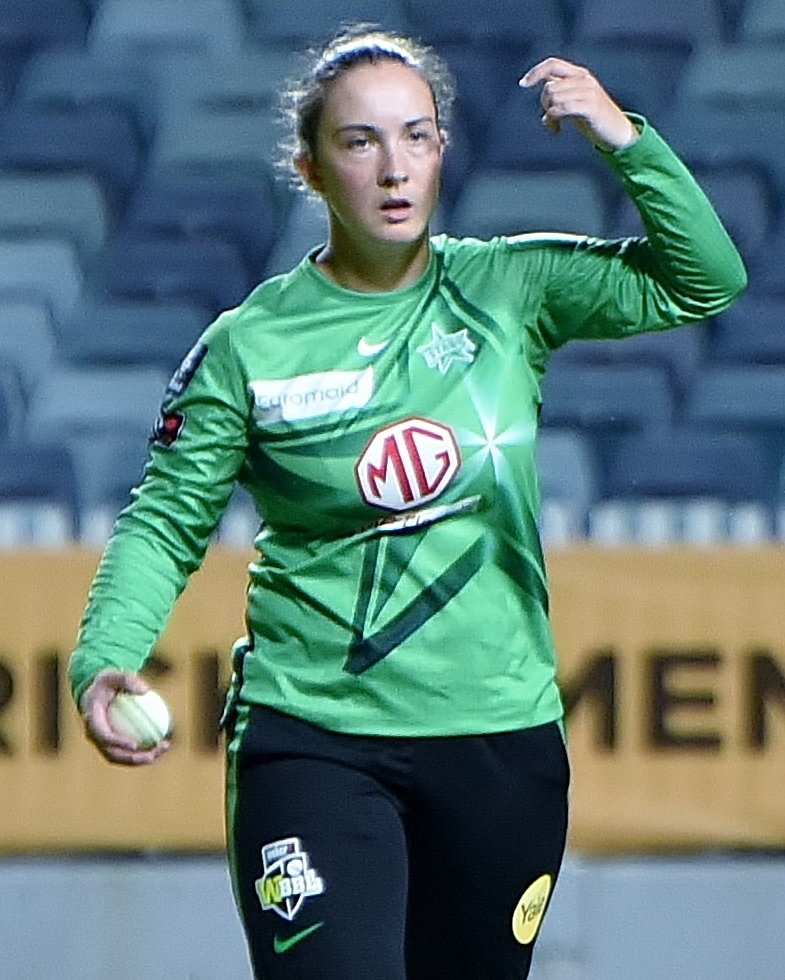
- Capsey playing for Melbourne Stars in October 2022

Personal information
- Full name: Alice Rose Capsey
- Born: 11 August 2004 (age 22); Redhill, Surrey, England
- Batting: Right-handed
- Bowling: Right-arm off break
- Role: All-rounder; occasional wicket-keeper

International information
- National side: England (2022–present)
- Only Test (cap 171): 10 July 2026 v India
- ODI debut (cap 140): 18 September 2022 v India
- Last ODI: 6 September 2026 v Ireland
- T20I debut (cap 55): 23 July 2022 v South Africa
- Last T20I: 5 July 2026 v Australia
- T20I shirt no.: 64

Domestic team information
- Years: Team
- 2019–present: Surrey
- 2020–2023: South East Stars
- 2021–2025: MI London
- 2022/23–2023/24: Melbourne Stars
- 2023–2025: Delhi Capitals
- 2024/25–2025/26: Melbourne Renegades
- 2026: Birmingham Phoenix
- 2026/27: Sydney Sixers

Career statistics
Competition	Test	ODI	T20I
Matches	1	39	58
Runs scored	30	566	1,053
Batting average	15.00	21.76	21.93
100s/50s	0/0	0/1	0/6
Top score	21	50	82
Balls bowled	–	514	156
Wickets	–	17	6
Bowling average	–	24.47	31.50
5 wickets in innings	–	0	0
10 wickets in match	–	0	0
Best bowling	–	3/22	2/4
Catches/stumpings	0/–	12/2	20/–
Medal record
Women's cricket
Representing England
ICC T20 World Cup
Runner-up	2026 England & Wales
- Source: Cricinfo, 16 July 2026

Alice Rose Capsey (born 11 August 2004) is an English cricketer. An all-rounder, she is a right-handed batter and right-arm off break bowler. In 2021, Capsey was voted the inaugural PCA Women's Young Player of the Year. Capsey made her international debut for the England women's cricket team in July 2022.

== Early life ==
Capsey was born on 11 August 2004 in Redhill, Surrey. She began playing cricket aged six, at Capel Cricket Club in Dorking.

== Domestic career ==
Capsey made her county debut in 2019, in a County Championship match for Surrey against Hampshire, and took 3/65 with the ball. She played also five Twenty20 Cup matches in 2019, and took 7 wickets at an average of 13.14. Capsey was part of the Surrey side that won their first London Cup in 2020, scoring 17 runs opening the batting. She was Surrey's leading run-scorer and leading wicket-taker in the 2021 Women's Twenty20 Cup, with 134 runs and 8 wickets. She took six wickets in three matches for Surrey in the 2022 Women's Twenty20 Cup, as well as scoring 41 runs.

In 2020, Capsey played for South East Stars in the Rachael Heyhoe Flint Trophy. She appeared in all six matches, and was the side's leading run-scorer with 141 runs at an average of 28.20, as well as taking 2 wickets. She also achieved her maiden half-century and List A high score in the tournament, scoring 73* to help her side to a 6 wicket victory over Sunrisers.

In 2021, Capsey played for Oval Invincibles in The Hundred. She scored a half-century at Lord's with 59 off 41 balls in her second game for the Invincibles and received the Match Hero award. Capsey won The Hundred with Oval Invincibles in 2021 and also finished the competition ranked third in the MVP Rankings. She continued her form into the Charlotte Edwards Cup, scoring 61 in the South East Stars victory over Southern Vipers and taking 2 wickets. Capsey top-scored with 40* in the final against the Northern Diamonds to help her side win the tournament, and also received the Player of the Match Award. Overall, she was the fourth-highest run-scorer in the competition, with 203 runs, as well as taking 7 wickets. She also scored 142 runs in the Rachael Heyhoe Flint Trophy, with a high score of 78, made against Lightning. At the end of the season, Capsey was voted as the inaugural PCA Women's Young Player of the Year for her performances. Capsey also signed a professional contract with South East Stars at the end of the season. In 2022, she played nine matches for South East Stars, across the Charlotte Edwards Cup and the Rachael Heyhoe Flint Trophy, with her top performance coming against Sunrisers, where she scored 64*. She also again won The Hundred, with Oval Invincibles, scoring 118 runs and taking 8 wickets.

In December 2022, she was shortlisted for that year's BBC Young Sports Personality of the Year Award.

For South East Stars in 2023, she took 6/28 against Western Storm in the Rachael Heyhoe Flint Trophy, as well as making one half-century in the Charlotte Edwards Cup and one half-century for Oval Invincibles in The Hundred.

== T20 Franchise career ==
In September 2022, she signed for Melbourne Stars for the 2022–23 Women's Big Bash League season. She was ever-present for the side that season, and was the side's second-highest run-scorer, with 259 runs at an average of 25.90, as well as taking 9 wickets. Against Hobart Hurricanes, Capsey made her Twenty20 high score, with 80* to see her team to a four wicket victory.

In February 2023, she was bought by Delhi Capitals via auction ahead of the inaugural season of the Women's Premier League for ₹75 lakh (equivalent to ₹82 lakh or US$87,000 in 2026). She played eight matches for the side as they reached the final of the tournament, scoring 159 runs and taking 6 wickets. She was Player of the Match in her side's final group stage match, scoring 34 runs and taking 3/26 from her four overs. She also remained with Melbourne Stars for the 2023–24 Women's Big Bash League season, scoring 283 runs including one half-century, and taking eight wickets.

== International career ==
Capsey was named as part of the England Academy for the 2019/20 intake. In December 2021, Capsey was named in England's A squad for their tour to Australia, with the matches being played alongside the Women's Ashes. She played five matches on the tour, including top-scoring with 44 from 31 deliveries in the first T20.

In July 2022, she was named in England's squad for their Women's Twenty20 International (WT20I) series against South Africa and for the cricket tournament at the 2022 Commonwealth Games in Birmingham, England. Capsey made her WT20I debut on 23 July 2022, during England's home series against South Africa, where she did not bat but took her maiden international wicket, dismissing Lara Goodall. She made 25 from 17 balls in the final match of the series. At the Commonwealth Games, Capsey was England's highest run-scorer, with 135 runs in five matches. She made her maiden international half-century in England's second match of the tournament, against South Africa, as well as top-scoring in England's victories over Sri Lanka and New Zealand. Capsey played much of the Commonwealth Games tournament with a black eye, sustained in the warm-up before England's opening match, which partially hindered her vision. Capsey played all six matches of England's series against India in September 2022, including making her One Day International debut on 18 September 2022. In November 2022, Capsey was awarded with her first England central contract.

In December 2022, Capsey was part of England's squad to tour the West Indies, but a broken collarbone in the field in the first ODI, ruled her out of the rest of the tour. In January 2023, despite her injury, Capsey was named in England's squad for the 2023 ICC Women's T20 World Cup, with the hope that she would be fit in time for the tournament. She went on to play all five of England's matches at the tournament, scoring 73 runs including one half-century, in a Player of the Match performance against Ireland.

She played six matches in the 2023 Women's Ashes series, including a Player of the Match performance in the 3rd T20I, scoring 46 from 23 deliveries. Later that summer, she was named in England's squad for their series against Sri Lanka, playing all six matches, scoring one half-century and taking three wickets. She was ever-present during the T20I series of England's tour of India in December 2023, scoring 32 runs.

She was named in the England squad for the 2024 ICC Women's T20 World Cup. Capsey was named in the England squad for the ODI part of their tour to South Africa in November 2024, but dropped from the Test and T20 line-ups. Just days before the series began, she was added to the T20 squad due to injury concerns with other players.

Capsey was named in the England squad for the 2025 Women's Ashes series in Australia.

On 2 June 2026, Capsey made her highest international score to-date, compiling 82 from 43 balls as England successfully chased 181 to defeat India in the decisive third match of their T20I series at the County Ground in Taunton.

In September 2026, Capsey kept wicket for England for the first time during an ODI series against Ireland.

== Honours ==
MI London (formerly Oval Invincibles)

- The Hundred: 2021, 2022

Delhi Capitals

- Women's Premier League runner-up: 2023, 2024, 2025

Melbourne Renegades

- Women's Big Bash League: 2024–25

England

- Women's T20 World Cup runner-up: 2026

Individual

- PCA Women's Young Player of the Year: 2021
