= Jordan Cox (cricketer) =

English cricketer (born 2000)

Personal information
- Full name: Jordan Matthew Cox
- Born: 21 October 2000 (age 26); Margate, Kent, England (Note: CricInfo originally listed Cox's birth place as Portsmouth. Kent sources, CricketArchive and Wisden all list it as Margate and CricInfo has now changed its listing. After Cox's double century innings a number of media reports used the information from CricInfo to wrongly attribute his place of birth.)
- Batting: Right-handed
- Bowling: Right-arm off-break
- Role: Wicket-keeper

International information
- National side: England (2024–present)
- Test debut (cap 722): 17 June 2026 v New Zealand
- Last Test: 9 September 2026 v Pakistan
- ODI debut (cap 276): 31 October 2024 v West Indies
- Last ODI: 18 November 2026 v Australia
- T20I debut (cap 103): 11 September 2024 v Australia
- Last T20I: 21 November 2026 v Australia

Domestic team information
- Years: Team
- 2019–2023: Kent
- 2021–2025: Oval Invincibles
- 2021/22: Hobart Hurricanes
- 2022/23: Dambulla Aura
- 2022/23: Sunrisers Eastern Cape
- 2023/24: Melbourne Renegades
- 2024–2025: Gulf Giants
- 2024–present: Essex
- 2025/26: Dubai Capitals
- 2026: Pretoria Capitals
- 2026–present: Royal Challengers Bengaluru
- 2026–present: Welsh Fire

Career statistics
| Competition | Test | ODI | T20I | FC |
|---|---|---|---|---|
| Matches | 4 | 11 | 10 | 67 |
| Runs scored | 254 | 246 | 127 | 4,347 |
| Batting average | 42.33 | 24.60 | 21.16 | 43.47 |
| 100s/50s | 0/3 | 0/2 | 0/1 | 12/17 |
| Top score | 73 | 76 | 55 | 238* |
| Catches/stumpings | 9/1 | 6/2 | 7/0 | 72/1 |
- Source: Cricinfo, 21 November 2026

Jordan Matthew Cox (born 21 October 2000) is an English professional cricketer who plays for Essex and England.

A member of the Kent academy since the age of 10, Margate-born Cox began his career with his home county, signing his first professional contract in 2018. After five years with Kent, Cox joined Essex in 2023.

Internationally, Cox was formerly an England Under-19 international, including at the 2020 World Cup. He made his full international debut in a T20I against Australia in September 2024.

== Early life ==
Cox was born in Margate and educated at Wellesley House School and Felsted School. He first played for Kent's Second XI in 2017. He played for the London and East team in the ECB Super-4s developmental T20 competition in 2018 and was named player of the tournament. In early 2019 he played for the England under-19 cricket team on their tour of Bangladesh. In club cricket, he formerly played for Sandwich Town in the Kent Cricket League.

== Domestic career ==
After scoring a century in a 50-over Second XI friendly in April 2019 he made his List A debut on 27 April 2019 against the touring Pakistanis, scoring 21. Following a series of good batting performances, including two centuries, for the Second XI during the 2019 season, Cox made his First-Class debut in July against Hampshire. He made his Twenty20 debut later the same month against Somerset in the T20 Blast.

In August 2020, Cox scored his maiden century in first-class cricket against Sussex at Canterbury in the second round of matches of the 2020 Bob Willis Trophy. Cox went on to finish the innings unbeaten on 238 in a Kent record partnership for any wicket of 423 runs with Jack Leaning. (Note: Kent's innings had to end after 120 overs due to regulations in place in the 2020 Bob Willis Trophy to limit the length of first innings during the COVID-19 pandemic.) Cox's century was the first scored in England by a player born in the 2000s.

Cox was subsequently dropped for Kent's next match after having posed for photographs with young fans of the club, a breach of club medical protocols put in place during the COVID-19 pandemic. Later that year, Cox signed a contract extension with Kent, extending his contract until the end of the 2023 season.

During the 2021 season, Cox was named Player of the Match as Kent won the 2021 T20 Blast final. He scored 58 not out from 28 balls in the final and his "incredible piece of fielding gymnastics" helped take the wicket of Somerset batsman Lewis Gregory, Cox palming the ball back from beyond the boundary to teammate Matt Milnes who was able to take the catch.

He was part of the Oval Invincibles squad for the 2021 season of The Hundred, having been selected in the Wildcard Draft in the run up to the start of the competition. Although he did not play a match for the team during the season, he was retained for the 2022 season. Cox holds an Australian passport and over the 2021/22 English off-season he played grade cricket for Mosman Cricket Club, having played for Eastern Suburbs the previous season.

In December 2021, he was recruited by Big Bash League team Hobart Hurricanes as a replacement for the opening match of their 2021–22 season. He has since gone on to play in multiple franchise leagues around the world between 2022 and 2024, including in Sri Lanka, South Africa, and Pakistan. In the 2023–24 edition of the Big Bash League, he represented Melbourne Renegades.

In October 2023, Cox signed for Essex on a three-year contract, making his debut the following April away to Nottinghamshire. He scored his first century in Essex colours in only his second match, at home to old club Kent and went on to finish his first season in Chelmsford with over 1,000 runs in all formats.

In July 2025, Cox scored his highest score in T20 Blast, scoring 139* off 60 Balls against Hampshire.

Cox was named 2025 Professional Cricketers' Association Men's Player of the Year.

In December 2025, he was bought by the Indian Premier League team Royal Challengers Bengaluru for his base price of ₹75 Lakh ahead of the 2026 season.

== International career ==
Cox was first called into the England under-19 squad for an all-format tour to Bangladesh in early 2019, making his Youth Test, ODI, and T20I debuts within a month of each other. He was again called up in August 2019 for a home Youth ODI tri-series of matches against India and Bangladesh.

After finishing another Youth ODI tri-series in December 2019 against West Indies and Sri Lanka as England Under-19s' leading run scorer, Cox was named in England's squad for the 2020 Under-19 Cricket World Cup in South Africa the following month.

In September 2022, Cox was one of five uncapped players named in the England squad for their seven-match Twenty20 International tour of Pakistan later in the same month. He would go on to make his T20I debut two years later, against Australia in Southampton, followed by his full ODI debut against West Indies in Antigua a month later.

In August 2024, he earned a maiden Test call-up against Sri Lanka. and was subsequently included in the England squad for a tour to New Zealand later that year. However, injury meant he was unable to feature in any of the three matches.

In May 2025 Cox was named in the England Men's Lions’ 15-player squad for the series against India A. However, he was ruled out due to Injury.

Cox made his Test debut in June 2026 during the 2nd Test against New Zealand, making 27 and 25 batting at seven.

On 20 August 2026, Cox hit his maiden Test half century against Pakistan off 78 balls during the first Test.
