= Saqib Mahmood =

English cricketer

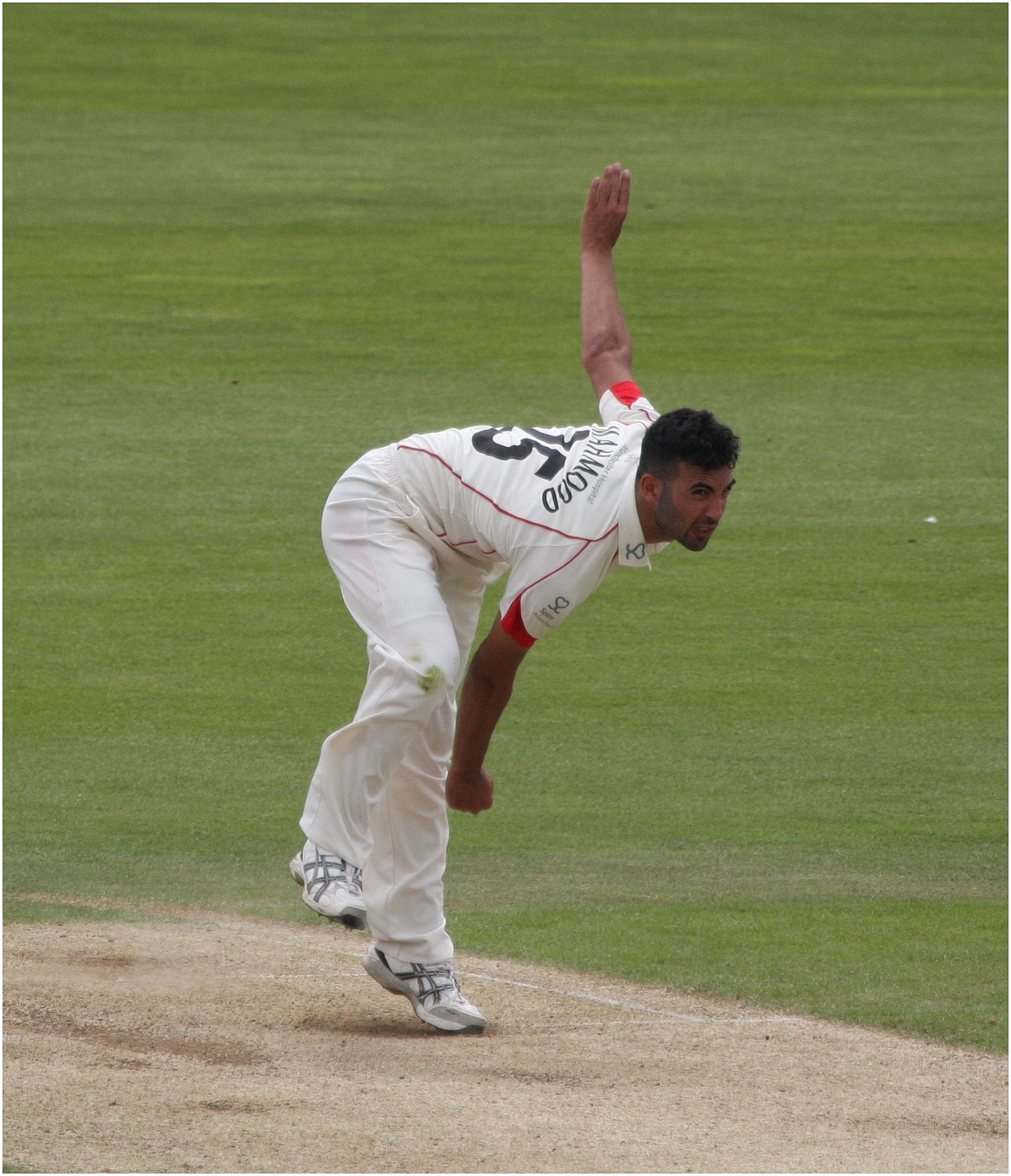
- Mahmood bowling in 2017

Personal information
- Full name: Saqib Mahmood
- Born: 25 February 1997 (age 29); Birmingham, West Midlands, England
- Nickname: Saqi
- Height: 6 ft 1 in (185 cm)
- Batting: Right-handed
- Bowling: Right-arm fast
- Role: Bowler

International information
- National side: England (2019–present)
- Test debut (cap 703): 16 March 2022 v West Indies
- Last Test: 24 March 2022 v West Indies
- ODI debut (cap 257): 9 February 2020 v South Africa
- Last ODI: 16 July 2026 v India
- ODI shirt no.: 25
- T20I debut (cap 89): 3 November 2019 v New Zealand
- Last T20I: 1 July 2026 v India
- T20I shirt no.: 25

Domestic team information
- Years: Team
- 2015–present: Lancashire (squad no. 25)
- 2020–2022: Peshawar Zalmi
- 2021–2025: Oval Invincibles
- 2021/22: Sydney Thunder
- 2026: Birmingham Phoenix

Career statistics
Competition	Test	ODI	T20I	FC
Matches	2	18	20	34
Runs scored	52	31	35	379
Batting average	52.00	10.33	7.00	16.47
100s/50s	0/0	0/0	0/0	0/0
Top score	49	12	12	49
Balls bowled	366	895	402	5,365
Wickets	6	27	24	87
Bowling average	22.83	28.88	25.79	31.97
5 wickets in innings	0	0	0	1
10 wickets in match	0	0	0	0
Best bowling	2/21	4/42	4/34	5/47
Catches/stumpings	1/–	3/–	2/–	6/–
- Source: ESPNcricinfo, 17 July 2026

Saqib Mahmood (born 25 February 1997) is an English cricketer who plays for England and Lancashire as a right-arm fast bowler. He made his international Twenty20 debut for England in November 2019, with his Test debut in March 2022.

== Early life ==
Mahmood was born in Birmingham, England to British Pakistani parents, with his ancestral roots in Attock, Punjab.

== Domestic career ==
In April 2019, Mahmood became the first bowler for Lancashire to take a five-wicket haul in successive List A matches, when he did so in the 2019 Royal London One-Day Cup.

In May 2021, Mahmood took his maiden five-wicket haul in first-class cricket, with 5/47 in the 2021 County Championship match against Yorkshire.

In April 2022, he was bought by the Oval Invincibles for the 2022 season of The Hundred. However, the following month he was ruled out of the rest of the season after suffering a back stress fracture.

Mahmood signed a new three-year contract to play white-ball cricket for Lancashire in October 2024. He was a key member of the Oval Invincibles team which emerged triumphant during the final of the 2024 The Hundred season and he played a pivotal role in helping his team Oval Invincibles to defend the title successfully by bowling a match winning spell of 3 for 17 runs against the Southern Brave and he masterminded the procession of wickets when he dismissed Leus du Plooy, Kieron Pollard and Laurie Evans inside seven balls. For his match winning efforts with the ball in the 2024 The Hundred final, he was awarded the player of the final.

== International career ==
In September 2019, Mahmood was named in England's Test and Twenty20 International (T20I) squads for their series against New Zealand. Mahmood made his T20I debut for England, against New Zealand, on 3 November 2019. Mahmood made his ODI debut for England, against South Africa, on 9 February 2020.

In August 2021, Mahmood was added to England's squad for the second Test against India, after Stuart Broad was ruled out of the rest of the series due to injury. In February 2022, Mahmood was again named in England's Test squad, this time for their series against the West Indies. Mahmood made his Test debut on 16 March 2022, for England against the West Indies. Mahmood faced setbacks to maintain his steady progress at international level, as he could not guarantee the role of being a mainstay in England team across formats after suffering consecutive lower-back stress fractures and he had to work on his way to regain fitness to earn his place in the lineup.

In November 2024, Mahmood earned player of the series award for his bowling exploits in the England's tour of the West Indies, where he dominated the West Indies batting lineup in the five-match T20I series by picking up nine wickets. During the five-match T20I series against the West Indies, he broke David Willey's record for having taken the most number of wickets by an England bowler inside the powerplay overs in either a bilateral T20I series or a T20I tournament after grabbing a tally of eight scalps within the 1-6 overs during the five-match T20I series. Willey held the previous England record for having taken the most T20I powerplay over wickets in a series or tournament with seven of them coming at the 2016 World Twenty20.

In around mid-January 2025, he faced visa clearance delays as he was supposed to tour India with the other England team members for their white ball bilateral home series. Due to his Pakistani heritage, he apparently faced delays in clearing his visa and he also apparently missed the pace-bowling camp in Abu Dhabi ahead of the India tour. He was belatedly granted visa by Indian officials and he arrived just in time to fly with the other England players to India. On 31 January 2025, Mahmood picked up a triple wicket maiden over in the second over of India's innings during the fourth T20I between England and India and during the procession of India's middle order collapse, albeit he had been the fulcrum of the collapse, as he picked up the priced scalps of Sanju Samson, Tilak Varma and Suryakumar Yadav in the same over in a space of six balls to reduce India to a precarious position of 12 runs for the loss of three wickets. He also became only the second ever bowler in a men's T20I match after West Indies's Jerome Taylor (who achieved the feat against South Africa in 2007) to complete the milestone of having taken three wickets while also not conceding any runs in the same over.

== Playing style ==
As a result of Mahmood's bowling action, his pace (up to 90 mph), his use of reverse-swing and yorkers, especially during the death-overs, he has been compared to Waqar Younis.
