= 2023 Central Sparks season =

English cricket season

Central Sparks
2023 season
- Coach: Lloyd Tennant
- Captain: Evelyn Jones
- Overseas player: (Australia) Erin Burns (New Zealand) Maddy Green
- RHFT: 5th
- CEC: 7th
- Most runs: RHFT: Evelyn Jones (440); CEC: Erin Burns (185)
- Most wickets: RHFT: Georgia Davis (27); CEC: Bethan Ellis (9) & Erin Burns (9)
- Most catches: RHFT: Ami Campbell (8); CEC: Erin Burns (8)
- Most wicket-keeping dismissals: RHFT: Abigail Freeborn (11); CEC: Amy Jones (4)

The 2023 season was Central Sparks' fourth season, in which they competed in the 50 over Rachael Heyhoe Flint Trophy and the Twenty20 Charlotte Edwards Cup. In the Charlotte Edwards Cup, the side won two of their seven matches, finishing seventh in the group. In the Rachael Heyhoe Flint Trophy, the side finished fifth in the group, winning six of their fourteen matches, with one tie and two no results.

The side was captained by Evelyn Jones and coached by Lloyd Tennant. They played four home matches apiece at Edgbaston Cricket Ground and New Road, and one apiece at Sir Paul Getty's Ground and Scorers, Shirley.

== Squad ==
=== Departures ===
On 7 November 2022, it was announced that Chloe Hill was leaving the side, joining Southern Vipers, the side she had been on loan to the previous season. On 20 February 2023, it was announced that Sarah Glenn had left the side, joining The Blaze. On 6 March 2023, it was confirmed that Stephanie Butler had left the side at the end of the 2022 season. On 18 April 2023, Central Sparks announced their squad for the season, confirming the departures of Gabrielle Basketter, Clare Boycott, Thea Brookes, Gwenan Davies and Milly Home.

=== Arrivals ===
On 3 November 2022, the side announced the signing of Chloe Brewer and Katie George on professional contracts, joining from South East Stars and Western Storm respectively. On 17 April 2023, Central Sparks announced the signing of Erin Burns as an overseas player between May and July 2023. On 18 April 2023, Central Sparks announced their squad for the season, confirming the additions of Ellie Anderson, Charis Pavely and Bethan Ellis. On 1 July 2023, Meg Austin was included in a matchday squad for the first time. On 31 August 2023, the side announced the signing of overseas player Maddy Green.

=== Personnel and contract changes ===
On 3 November 2022, the side announced the players that had been awarded professional contracts for the 2023 season, with Davina Perrin signing her first such contract with the side. On 31 January 2023, Central Sparks announced a further three players who had been awarded professional contracts with the side, with Hannah Baker, Grace Potts and Georgia Davis all signing their first such contracts.

=== Squad list ===
- Age given is at the start of Central Sparks' first match of the season (22 April 2023).

Name	Nationality	Birth date	Batting Style	Bowling Style	Notes
Batters
Meg Austin	England	7 September 2004 (aged 18)	Right-handed	Right-arm leg break	Joined July 2023
Chloe Brewer	England	12 July 2002 (aged 20)	Right-handed	Right-arm medium	
Ami Campbell	England	6 June 1991 (aged 31)	Left-handed	Right-arm medium	
Maddy Green	New Zealand	20 October 1992 (aged 30)	Right-handed	Right-arm off break	Overseas player; September 2023
Evelyn Jones	England	8 August 1992 (aged 30)	Left-handed	Left-arm medium	Captain
Davina Perrin	England	8 September 2006 (aged 16)	Right-handed	Right-arm leg break	
All-rounders
Erin Burns	Australia	22 June 1988 (aged 34)	Right-handed	Right-arm off break	Overseas player; May to July 2023
Bethan Ellis	England	7 July 1999 (aged 23)	Right-handed	Right-arm medium	
Ria Fackrell	England	16 September 1999 (aged 23)	Right-handed	Right-arm off break	
Katie George	England	7 April 1999 (aged 24)	Right-handed	Left-arm medium	
Charis Pavely	England	25 October 2004 (aged 18)	Left-handed	Slow left-arm orthodox	
Wicket-keepers
Poppy Davies	England	23 June 2000 (aged 22)	Right-handed	—	
Abigail Freeborn	England	12 November 1996 (aged 26)	Right-handed	—	
Amy Jones	England	13 June 1993 (aged 29)	Right-handed	—	
Bowlers
Ellie Anderson	England	23 February 1994 (aged 29)	Right-handed	Right-arm medium	
Emily Arlott	England	23 February 1998 (aged 25)	Right-handed	Right-arm medium	
Hannah Baker	England	3 February 2004 (aged 19)	Right-handed	Right-arm leg break	
Georgia Davis	England	3 June 1999 (aged 23)	Right-handed	Right-arm off break	
Anisha Patel	England	17 August 1995 (aged 27)	Right-handed	Right-arm leg break	
Grace Potts	England	12 July 2002 (aged 20)	Right-handed	Right-arm medium	
Elizabeth Russell	England	22 May 1994 (aged 28)	Left-handed	Right-arm medium	
Issy Wong	England	15 May 2002 (aged 20)	Right-handed	Right-arm medium	

== Rachael Heyhoe Flint Trophy ==
=== Season standings ===
Pos	Team	Pld	W	L	T	NR	BP	Pts	NRR
1	Southern Vipers (Q)	14	7	4	1	2	4	38	0.457
2	The Blaze (Q)	14	7	4	0	3	4	38	0.173
3	South East Stars (Q)	14	7	6	0	1	6	36	0.583
4	Sunrisers	14	6	5	0	3	2	32	−0.006
5	Central Sparks	14	6	5	1	2	1	31	−0.233
6	Northern Diamonds	14	6	7	0	1	4	30	−0.034
7	North West Thunder	14	3	5	2	4	2	26	−0.274
8	Western Storm	14	2	8	0	4	0	16	−1.068

Source: England and Wales Cricket Board

advanced to the final advanced to the play-off

=== Fixtures ===
22 April 2023
10:30
Scorecard

The Blaze; 212 (46.4 overs)	v	Central Sparks; 153 (48.2 overs)
Tammy Beaumont 60 (77); Georgia Davis 3/33 (9 overs)		Katie George 31 (37); Lucy Higham 5/19 (10 overs)

The Blaze won by 59 runs
Trent Bridge, Nottingham
Umpires: Sarah Bartlett and Sue Redfern

- The Blaze won the toss and elected to bat.
- Points: The Blaze 5, Central Sparks 0

29 April 2023
10:30
Scorecard

Northern Diamonds; 161 (36.3 overs)	v	Central Sparks; 162/3 (38.2 overs)
Lauren Winfield-Hill 42 (40); Georgia Davis 4/19 (7.3 overs)		Evelyn Jones 67* (111); Jessica Woolston 1/21 (5 overs)

Central Sparks won by 7 wickets
New Road, Worcester
Umpires: Naeem Ashraf and Jasmine Naeem

- Central Sparks won the toss and elected to field.
- Points: Central Sparks 5, Northern Diamonds 0

1 May 2023
10:30
Scorecard

Central Sparks; 183/9 (50 overs)	v	Southern Vipers; 184/7 (41.1 overs)
Ami Campbell 54 (76); Georgia Adams 4/30 (10 overs)		Georgia Adams 50 (71); Emily Arlott 2/23 (9 overs)

Southern Vipers won by 3 wickets
Sir Paul Getty's Ground, Wormsley
Umpires: Anna Harris and Tom Lungley

- Southern Vipers won the toss and elected to field.
- Points: Southern Vipers 4, Central Sparks 0

6 May 2023
10:30
Scorecard

North West Thunder; 234 (47.1 overs)	v	Central Sparks; 223/9 (45 overs)
Sophie Ecclestone 74 (65); Erin Burns 4/56 (10 overs)		Evelyn Jones 69 (106); Kate Cross 3/40 (9 overs)

Match Tied (DLS method)
Old Trafford Cricket Ground, Manchester
Umpires: Anthony Harris and Joanne Ibbotson

- Central Sparks won the toss and elected to field.
- Central Sparks were set a revised target of 224 runs from 45 overs due to rain.
- Points: Central Sparks 2, North West Thunder 2

10 May 2023
10:30
Scorecard

Southern Vipers; 180 (47.2 overs)	v	Central Sparks; 183/4 (41.2 overs)
Ella McCaughan 59 (90); Erin Burns 5/36 (10 overs)		Evelyn Jones 73 (124); Georgia Elwiss 2/27 (10 overs)

Central Sparks won by 6 wickets
County Ground, Hove
Umpires: Paul Nicholls and Chris Watts

- Central Sparks won the toss and elected to field.
- Points: Central Sparks 4, Southern Vipers 0

2 July 2023
10:30
Scorecard

Central Sparks; 233 (50 overs)	v	North West Thunder; 204 (48.4 overs)
Ami Campbell 68 (72); Tara Norris 4/42 (9 overs)		Seren Smale 94 (125); Katie George 3/57 (9.4 overs)

Central Sparks won by 29 runs
New Road, Worcester
Umpires: James Middlebrook and Sam Hollingshead

- North West Thunder won the toss and elected to field.
- Points: Central Sparks 4, North West Thunder 0

7 July 2023
10:30
Scorecard

Central Sparks; 246/8 (50 overs)	v	South East Stars; 225 (47.3 overs)
Charis Pavely 57* (52); Alice Davidson-Richards 3/46 (9 overs)		Madeleine Blinkhorn-Jones 77 (80); Katie George 3/30 (9.3 overs)

Central Sparks won by 21 runs
Woodbridge Road, Guildford
Umpires: Julia Jarvis and Mark Newell

- Central Sparks won the toss and elected to bat.
- Points: Central Sparks 4, South East Stars 0

11 July 2023
10:30
Scorecard

Western Storm	v	Central Sparks

No result
Scorers, Shirley
Umpires: Joanne Ibbotson and Naeem Ashraf

- Central Sparks won the toss and elected to field.
- No play was possible due to rain.
- Points: Central Sparks 2, Western Storm 2

15 July 2023
10:30
Scorecard

Northern Diamonds; 223/4 (34 overs)	v	Central Sparks; 164/5 (18.4 overs)
Hollie Armitage 66 (56); Georgia Davis 2/40 (4 overs)		Katie George 56 (35); Katie Levick 3/31 (3.4 overs)

Central Sparks won by 5 wickets (DLS method)
Headingley Cricket Ground, Leeds
Umpires: Grace Bambury and Simon Widdup

- Central Sparks won the toss and elected to field.
- Northern Diamonds innings reduced to 34 overs due to rain.
- Central Sparks innings reduced to 19 overs due to rain; target was 164.
- Points: Central Sparks 4, Northern Diamonds 0

22 July 2023
10:30
Scorecard

Central Sparks	v	Sunrisers

Match abandoned
New Road, Worcester

- No toss.
- No play was possible due to rain.
- Points: Central Sparks 2, Sunrisers 2

5 September 2023
10:30
Scorecard

Central Sparks; 189 (49.5 overs)	v	The Blaze; 193/7 (45.1 overs)
Bethan Ellis 53 (97); Josie Groves 3/39 (10 overs)		Nat Sciver-Brunt 66* (71); Georgia Davis 2/28 (10 overs)

The Blaze won by 3 wickets
Edgbaston Cricket Ground, Birmingham
Umpires: Paul Baldwin and Rose Dovey

- Central Sparks won the toss and elected to bat.
- Points: The Blaze 4, Central Sparks 0

10 September 2023
10:30
Scorecard

Central Sparks; 227/8 (50 overs)	v	Sunrisers; 228/6 (45 overs)
Abigail Freeborn 107* (140); Jo Gardner 2/21 (5 overs)		Amara Carr 58 (79); Emily Arlott 2/33 (10 overs)

Sunrisers won by 4 wickets
County Ground, Chelmsford
Umpires: Anthony Harris and James Tredwell

- Central Sparks won the toss and elected to bat.
- Points: Sunrisers 4, Central Sparks 0

13 September 2023
10:30
Scorecard

Western Storm; 241/8 (50 overs)	v	Central Sparks; 242/3 (44.1 overs)
Nat Wraith 39 (48); Georgia Davis 2/32 (10 overs)		Evelyn Jones 84* (113); Sophia Smale 2/38 (10 overs)

Central Sparks won by 7 wickets
County Ground, Taunton
Umpires: Gabi Brown and Ian Blackwell

- Central Sparks won the toss and elected to field.
- Points: Central Sparks 4, Western Storm 0

16 September 2023
10:30
Scorecard

South East Stars; 283/7 (50 overs)	v	Central Sparks; 131 (35.1 overs)
Bryony Smith 97 (81); Hannah Baker 2/46 (9 overs)		Maddy Green 39 (48); Alice Davidson-Richards 3/20 (8 overs)

South East Stars won by 152 runs
Edgbaston Cricket Ground, Birmingham
Umpires: Joanne Ibbotson and Naeem Ashraf

- Central Sparks won the toss and elected to field.
- Points: South East Stars 5, Central Sparks 0

=== Tournament statistics ===
==== Batting ====
Player	Matches	Innings	Runs	Average	High score	100s	50s
Evelyn Jones	13	12	440	44.00	84*	0	4
Abigail Freeborn	13	12	401	36.45	107*	1	1
Ami Campbell	13	12	237	23.70	68	0	2
Katie George	13	9	231	25.66	56	0	2

Source: ESPN Cricinfo Qualification: 200 runs.

==== Bowling ====
Player	Matches	Overs	Wickets	Average	Economy	BBI	5wi
Georgia Davis	13	99.4	27	14.77	4.00	4/19	0
Katie George	13	92.2	18	25.77	5.02	3/30	0
Erin Burns	6	47.0	12	17.83	4.55	5/36	1
Emily Arlott	9	72.4	11	27.09	4.10	3/41	0
Hannah Baker	7	55.1	10	27.10	4.91	2/31	0

Source: ESPN Cricinfo Qualification: 10 wickets.

== Charlotte Edwards Cup ==
=== Season standings ===
Pos	Team	Pld	W	L	T	NR	BP	Pts	NRR
1	The Blaze (Q)	7	7	0	0	0	4	32	1.765
2	Southern Vipers (Q)	7	5	2	0	0	2	22	0.940
3	North West Thunder (Q)	7	4	3	0	0	2	18	0.331
4	Northern Diamonds	7	4	3	0	0	1	17	−0.129
5	South East Stars	7	3	4	0	0	0	12	−0.096
6	Western Storm	7	3	4	0	0	0	12	−0.512
7	Central Sparks	7	2	5	0	0	0	8	−0.558
8	Sunrisers	7	0	7	0	0	0	0	−1.717

Source: England and Wales Cricket Board

advanced to final advanced to the semi-final

=== Fixtures ===
18 May 2023
18:30 BST (D/N)
Scorecard

Central Sparks; 137 (19.5 overs)	v	Sunrisers; 114 (19 overs)
Amy Jones 51 (34); Kelly Castle 3/24 (4 overs)		Cordelia Griffith 53 (46); Emily Arlott 4/23 (4 overs)

Central Sparks won by 23 runs
County Ground, Chelmsford
Umpires: Billy Taylor and Sue Redfern

- Sunrisers won the toss and elected to field.
- Points: Central Sparks 4, Sunrisers 0

23 May 2023
11:00 BST
Scorecard

Northern Diamonds; 135 (19.3 overs)	v	Central Sparks; 132/7 (20 overs)
Leah Dobson 41 (25); Georgia Davis 3/13 (4 overs)		Evelyn Jones 30 (34); Chloe Tryon 3/30 (4 overs)

Northern Diamonds won by 3 runs
Edgbaston Cricket Ground, Birmingham
Umpires: Anna Harris and Anthony Harris

- Central Sparks won the toss and elected to field.
- Points: Northern Diamonds 4, Central Sparks 0

26 May 2023
13:00 BST
Scorecard

The Blaze; 212/5 (20 overs)	v	Central Sparks; 156/6 (20 overs)
Nat Sciver-Brunt 96* (50); Issy Wong 2/39 (4 overs)		Amy Jones 55 (39); Nadine de Klerk 2/26 (4 overs)

The Blaze won by 56 runs
Grace Road, Leicester
Umpires: Rose Dovey and Jack Shantry

- Central Sparks won the toss and elected to field.
- Points: The Blaze 5, Central Sparks 0

29 May 2023
10:30 BST
Scorecard

North West Thunder; 155/6 (20 overs)	v	Central Sparks; 119/9 (20 overs)
Emma Lamb 64 (49); Bethan Ellis 2/22 (4 overs)		Erin Burns 41 (23); Fi Morris 2/16 (4 overs)

North West Thunder won by 36 runs
New Road, Worcester
Umpires: Jack Shantry and Rose Dovey

- Central Sparks won the toss and elected to field.
- Points: North West Thunder 5, Central Sparks 0

3 June 2023
14:30 BST
Scorecard

Central Sparks; 142/9 (20 overs)	v	Southern Vipers; 135/8 (20 overs)
Amy Jones 45 (34); Charlie Dean 3/27 (4 overs)		Danni Wyatt 68 (49); Bethan Ellis 4/29 (4 overs)

Central Sparks won by 7 runs
Edgbaston Cricket Ground, Birmingham
Umpires: Anthony Harris and Grace Bambury

- Central Sparks won the toss and elected to bat.
- Points: Central Sparks 4, Southern Vipers 0

4 June 2023
10:30 BST
Scorecard

Central Sparks; 135/6 (20 overs)	v	Western Storm; 137/3 (19.2 overs)
Erin Burns 66 (45); Danielle Gibson 4/23 (4 overs)		Orla Prendergast 46* (43); Hannah Baker 1/21 (4 overs)

Western Storm won by 7 wickets
County Ground, Bristol
Umpires: Rose Dovery and Sophie McLelland

- Central Sparks won the toss and elected to bat.
- Points: Western Storm 4, Central Sparks 0

7 June 2023
14:00 BST
Scorecard

South East Stars; 176/6 (20 overs)	v	Central Sparks; 170 (19.3 overs)
Phoebe Franklin 52 (27); Georgia Davis 3/12 (4 overs)		Katie George 53 (34); Bryony Smith 3/23 (3.3 overs)

South East Stars won by 6 runs
St Lawrence Ground, Canterbury
Umpires: Fiona Richards and James Tredwell

- Central Sparks won the toss and elected to field.
- Points: South East Stars 4, Central Sparks 0

=== Tournament statistics ===
==== Batting ====
Player	Matches	Innings	Runs	Average	High score	100s	50s
Erin Burns	7	7	185	26.42	66	0	1
Amy Jones	4	4	167	41.75	55	0	2
Abigail Freeborn	7	6	108	21.60	31*	0	0

Source: ESPN Cricinfo Qualification: 100 runs.

==== Bowling ====
Player	Matches	Overs	Wickets	Average	Economy	BBI	5wi
Bethan Ellis	5	16.2	9	13.33	7.34	4/29	0
Erin Burns	7	26.0	9	22.22	7.69	3/26	0
Georgia Davis	7	21.0	8	15.75	6.00	3/12	0
Emily Arlott	3	11.3	6	13.33	6.95	4/23	0

Source: ESPN Cricinfo Qualification: 5 wickets.

== Season statistics ==
=== Batting ===
Player	Rachael Heyhoe Flint Trophy								Charlotte Edwards Cup							
Player	Matches	Innings	Runs	High score	Average	Strike rate	100s	50s	Matches	Innings	Runs	High score	Average	Strike rate	100s	50s
Ellie Anderson	1	–	–	–	–	–	–	–	4	3	14	8	7.00	70.00	0	0
Emily Arlott	9	6	50	22	8.33	54.34	0	0	3	3	57	28*	28.50	126.66	0	0
Hannah Baker	7	3	19	11	6.33	43.18	0	0	5	3	4	2*	2.00	66.66	0	0
Chloe Brewer	4	4	4	4	1.00	23.52	0	0	2	2	9	9	4.50	52.94	0	0
Erin Burns	6	5	94	37	23.50	81.73	0	0	7	7	185	66	26.42	141.22	0	1
Ami Campbell	13	12	237	68	23.70	81.72	0	2	7	7	60	20	8.57	83.33	0	0
Georgia Davis	13	8	28	8	4.00	42.42	0	0	7	4	7	5*	7.00	53.84	0	0
Bethan Ellis	8	6	113	53	18.83	50.00	0	1	5	5	60	29	20.00	101.69	0	0
Ria Fackrell	2	2	22	12*	–	78.57	0	0	–	–	–	–	–	–	–	–
Abigail Freeborn	13	12	401	107*	36.45	63.05	1	1	7	6	108	31*	21.60	111.34	0	0
Katie George	13	9	231	56	25.66	92.03	0	2	6	6	80	30	13.33	89.88	0	0
Maddy Green	4	4	117	64	29.25	84.17	0	1	–	–	–	–	–	–	–	–
Amy Jones	1	1	40	40	40.00	100.00	0	0	4	4	167	55	41.75	131.49	0	2
Evelyn Jones	13	12	440	84*	44.00	59.70	0	4	6	6	80	30	13.33	89.88	0	0
Charis Pavely	6	5	110	57*	36.66	90.90	0	1	2	2	7	4*	7.00	100.00	0	0
Davina Perrin	9	6	62	30	15.50	53.44	0	0	6	6	76	28	12.66	95.00	0	0
Grace Potts	13	7	51	12*	25.50	43.58	0	0	3	1	5	5	5.00	100.00	0	0
Issy Wong	8	6	84	50	16.80	81.55	0	1	3	3	14	7	14.00	116.66	0	0
Source: ESPN Cricinfo

=== Bowling ===
Player	Rachael Heyhoe Flint Trophy							Charlotte Edwards Cup						
Player	Matches	Overs	Wickets	Average	Economy	BBI	5wi	Matches	Overs	Wickets	Average	Economy	BBI	5wi
Ellie Anderson	1	–	–	–	–	–	–	4	14.0	2	45.00	6.42	1/14	0
Emily Arlott	9	72.4	11	27.09	4.10	3/41	0	3	11.3	6	13.33	6.95	4/23	0
Hannah Baker	7	55.1	10	27.10	4.91	2/31	0	5	17.0	2	67.50	7.94	1/21	0
Chloe Brewer	4	2.0	0	–	8.50	–	0	–	–	–	–	–	–	–
Erin Burns	6	47.0	12	17.83	4.55	5/36	1	7	26.0	9	22.22	7.69	3/26	0
Georgia Davis	13	99.4	27	14.77	4.00	4/19	0	7	21.0	8	15.75	6.00	3/12	0
Bethan Ellis	8	26.0	3	43.33	5.00	2/22	0	5	16.2	9	13.33	7.34	4/29	0
Ria Fackrell	2	10.0	1	54.00	5.40	1/37	0	–	–	–	–	–	–	–
Katie George	13	92.2	18	25.77	5.02	3/30	0	6	15.0	4	36.25	9.66	1/18	0
Charis Pavely	6	4.0	0	–	5.25	–	0	–	–	–	–	–	–	–
Grace Potts	13	84.1	7	54.00	4.49	3/46	0	3	10.0	4	13.75	5.50	2/13	0
Issy Wong	8	46.1	8	32.37	5.61	2/29	0	3	7.0	2	35.50	10.14	2/39	0
Source: ESPN Cricinfo

=== Fielding ===
Player	Rachael Heyhoe Flint Trophy			Charlotte Edwards Cup		
Player	Matches	Innings	Catches	Matches	Innings	Catches
Ellie Anderson	1	1	0	4	4	0
Emily Arlott	9	9	4	3	3	1
Hannah Baker	7	7	0	5	5	0
Chloe Brewer	4	4	1	2	2	1
Erin Burns	6	5	2	7	7	8
Ami Campbell	13	12	8	7	7	1
Georgia Davis	13	12	4	7	7	1
Bethan Ellis	8	7	2	5	5	1
Ria Fackrell	2	2	0	–	–	–
Abigail Freeborn	13	0	0	7	4	1
Katie George	13	12	6	6	6	7
Maddy Green	4	4	1	–	–	–
Amy Jones	1	1	0	4	0	0
Evelyn Jones	13	12	5	6	6	4
Charis Pavely	6	5	2	2	2	1
Davina Perrin	9	8	2	6	6	3
Grace Potts	13	12	7	3	3	0
Issy Wong	8	8	3	3	3	0
Source: ESPN Cricinfo

=== Wicket-keeping ===
Player	Rachael Heyhoe Flint Trophy				Charlotte Edwards Cup			
Player	Matches	Innings	Catches	Stumpings	Matches	Innings	Catches	Stumpings
Abigail Freeborn	13	12	10	1	7	3	1	2
Amy Jones	1	–	–	–	4	4	1	3
Source: ESPN Cricinfo
