= 2021 Women's Twenty20 Cup =

English cricket season

- Administrator(s): England and Wales Cricket Board
- Cricket format: Twenty20
- Tournament format(s): League system
- Champions: No overall winner
- Participants: 36
- Matches: 144
- Most runs: Imogen Sidhu (293)
- Most wickets: Finty Trussler (16)

The 2021 Women's Twenty20 Cup, known for sponsorship reasons as the 2021 Vitality Women's County T20, was the 12th cricket Women's Twenty20 Cup tournament, taking place in April and May, with 36 teams taking part: 34 county teams plus Scotland and Wales. There was no overall winner, with Hertfordshire, Nottinghamshire, Lancashire, Kent, Gloucestershire and Somerset winning their respective regions.

The 2020 tournament was cancelled due to the COVID-19 pandemic and, following a restructuring of women's cricket in England that saw the ending of the Women's County Championship, the Twenty20 Cup was the only nationwide tournament featuring county sides in 2021. The tournament will be followed by competitions involving regional teams, in 50-over and Twenty20 formats, as well as The Hundred.

== Competition format ==
Teams played matches within a series of regional divisions. Matches were played using a Twenty20 format. There was no overall winner, as no stage further to the regional group stage was scheduled.

The groups worked on a points system with positions being based on total points. Points were awarded as follows:

Win: 4 points.
Tie: 2 points.
Loss: 0 points.
Abandoned/Cancelled: 1 point.

== Teams ==
The 2021 Women's Twenty20 Cup was divided into 6 regional groups. Teams played 8 matches, across 4 'double-header' matchdays, playing their opponents twice on one day. The teams were divided as follows:

East Group	Buckinghamshire	Cambridgeshire	Hertfordshire	Huntingdonshire	Norfolk	Suffolk
East Midlands Group	Derbyshire	Leicestershire and Rutland	Lincolnshire	Northamptonshire	Nottinghamshire	Shropshire
North Group	Cumbria	Lancashire	North East Warriors	North Representative XI	Scotland A	Yorkshire
South East Group	Essex	Hampshire	Kent	Middlesex	Surrey	Sussex
South West Group	Cornwall	Devon	Dorset	Gloucestershire	Oxfordshire	Wiltshire
West Midlands Group	Berkshire	Somerset	Staffordshire	Wales	Warwickshire	Worcestershire

== Standings ==
=== East Group ===
Team	Pld	W	L	T	A	C	NRR	Ded	Pts
Hertfordshire (C)	8	5	0	0	3	0	+3.52	0	23
Buckinghamshire	8	4	2	0	2	0	+2.08	0	18
Suffolk	8	4	2	0	2	0	+0.39	0	18
Cambridgeshire	8	4	2	0	2	0	–0.07	0	18
Huntingdonshire	8	0	5	0	3	0	–3.40	0	3
Norfolk	8	0	6	0	2	0	–2.34	0	2

Source: ECB Women's Twenty20 Cup

=== East Midlands Group ===
Team	Pld	W	L	T	A	C	NRR	Ded	Pts
Nottinghamshire (C)	8	5	0	0	3	0	+1.66	0	23
Lincolnshire	8	3	1	0	4	0	+1.81	0	16
Shropshire	8	2	2	0	4	0	–0.02	0	12
Derbyshire	8	2	3	0	3	0	+0.07	0	11
Leicestershire and Rutland	8	2	4	0	2	0	–0.72	0	10
Northamptonshire	8	1	5	0	2	0	–1.92	0	6

Source: ECB Women's Twenty20 Cup

=== North Group ===
Team	Pld	W	L	T	A	C	NRR	Ded	Pts
Lancashire (C)	8	4	0	0	4	0	+5.07	0	20
Scotland A	8	4	2	0	2	0	+0.43	0	18
North Representative XI	8	3	1	0	4	0	–0.52	0	16
Yorkshire	8	2	0	0	6	0	+3.89	0	14
North East Warriors	8	1	5	0	2	0	–0.92	0	6
Cumbria	8	0	6	0	2	0	–3.95	0	2

Source: ECB Women's Twenty20 Cup

=== South East Group ===
Team	Pld	W	L	T	A	C	NRR	Ded	Pts
Kent (C)	8	6	0	0	2	0	+1.30	0	26
Surrey	8	4	3	0	1	0	–0.16	0	17
Hampshire	8	3	3	0	2	0	+0.28	0	14
Sussex	8	3	3	0	2	0	–0.17	0	14
Middlesex	8	3	4	0	1	0	+0.18	0	13
Essex	8	0	6	0	2	0	–1.54	0	2

Source: ECB Women's Twenty20 Cup

=== South West Group ===
Team	Pld	W	L	T	A	C	NRR	Ded	Pts
Gloucestershire (C)	8	4	0	0	4	0	+0.78	0	20
Devon	8	4	2	0	2	0	+2.96	0	18
Cornwall	8	4	2	0	2	0	+0.45	0	18
Dorset	8	2	2	0	4	0	+2.70	0	12
Oxfordshire	8	2	2	0	4	0	–0.10	0	12
Wiltshire	8	0	8	0	0	0	–3.83	0	0

Source: ECB Women's Twenty20 Cup

=== West Midlands Group ===
Team	Pld	W	L	T	A	C	NRR	Ded	Pts
Somerset (C)	8	5	1	0	2	0	+1.75	0	22
Warwickshire	8	4	0	0	4	0	+2.66	0	20
Worcestershire	8	2	2	0	4	0	–1.19	0	12
Wales	8	1	3	0	4	0	–0.86	0	8
Staffordshire	8	0	2	0	6	0	–1.10	0	6
Berkshire	8	0	4	0	4	0	–2.75	0	4

Source: ECB Women's Twenty20 Cup

== Fixtures ==
=== East Group ===
25 April 2021
11:00
Scorecard

Buckinghamshire; 107/4 (20 overs)	v	Cambridgeshire; 108/3 (19.2 overs)
Cara Duggan 32 (30); Sally Phelps 3/26 (4 overs)		Isabella Routledge 45 (53); Hannah Davis 1/7 (3 overs)

Cambridgeshire won by 7 wickets
Exning Park, Exning

- Cambridgeshire won the toss and elected to field.

25 April 2021
11:00
Scorecard

Norfolk; 56 (13.2 overs)	v	Hertfordshire; 57/0 (8.2 overs)
Ellie Stanley 13 (19); Ella Phillips 5/2 (2.2 overs)		Amelia Kemp 27* (26)

Hertfordshire won by 10 wickets
Harlow CC, Harlow
Umpires: Tim Caldicott and Tracey Murphy

- Norfolk won the toss and elected to bat.

25 April 2021
11:00
Scorecard

Suffolk; 121/8 (20 overs)	v	Huntingdonshire; 101/5 (20 overs)
Imogen Sidhu 50 (51); Amber Mays 1/10 (4 overs)		Annabelle Woodward 25* (36); Lottie Kent 2/9 (4 overs)

Suffolk won by 20 runs
Ramsey CC, Ramsey

- Huntingdonshire won the toss and elected to field.

25 April 2021
15:00
Scorecard

Cambridgeshire; 118 (20 overs)	v	Buckinghamshire; 115/1 (20 overs)
Kelly Haynes 27 (32); Bethan Miles 2/11 (4 overs)		Bethan Miles 53*; Poppy Challis 1/12 (2 overs)

Cambridgeshire won by 3 runs
Exning Park, Exning

- Cambridgeshire won the toss and elected to bat.

25 April 2021
15:00
Scorecard

Hertfordshire; 169/6 (20 overs)	v	Norfolk; 76/8 (20 overs)
Kezia Hassall 85 (54); Amy Cubitt 2/34 (3 overs)		May Drinkell 19 (16); Mabel Reid 2/10 (4 overs)

Hertfordshire won by 93 runs
Harlow CC, Harlow
Umpires: Tim Caldicott and Tracey Murphy

- Norfolk won the toss and elected to field.

25 April 2021
15:00
Scorecard

Suffolk; 138/5 (20 overs)	v	Huntingdonshire; 89/4 (20 overs)
Imogen Sidhu 63* (64); Amber Mays 2/8 (4 overs)		Annabelle Woodward 37 (56); Sophie Hughes 2/23 (4 overs)

Suffolk won by 49 runs
Ramsey CC, Ramsey

- Suffolk won the toss and elected to bat.

3 May 2021
11:00
Scorecard

Buckinghamshire; 109/6 (20 overs)	v	Norfolk; 76 (20 overs)
Ella Claridge 42 (–); Jade Hoyte 2/1 (2 overs)		Amy Cubitt 12 (–); Natalie Gurnett 3/16 (4 overs)

Buckinghamshire won by 33 runs
Dinton Cricket Club Ground, Dinton
Umpires: Yolanda Harris and Linda Day

- Buckinghamshire won the toss and elected to bat.

3 May 2021
11:00
Scorecard

Huntingdonshire; 36 (19.5 overs)	v	Hertfordshire; 37/0 (4.1 overs)
Chloe Sainsbury 12 (30); Lydia Borbas 4/5 (4 overs)		Elsa Barnfather 17* (13)

Hertfordshire won by 10 wickets
Ramsey CC, Ramsey

- Hertfordshire won the toss and elected to field.

3 May 2021
11:00
Scorecard

Suffolk; 137/2 (20 overs)	v	Cambridgeshire; 106/3 (20 overs)
Imogen Sidhu 60* (49); Sally Phelps 1/16 (4 overs)		Kelly Haynes 32 (26); Isobel Sidhu 1/10 (3 overs)

Suffolk won by 31 runs
Woolpit CC, Woolpit

- Suffolk won the toss and elected to bat.

3 May 2021
15:00
Scorecard

Norfolk; 73 (18 overs)	v	Buckinghamshire; 74/0 (10.1 overs)
May Drinkell 18 (–); Bethan Miles 4/9 (3 overs)		Ella Claridge 54* (–)

Buckinghamshire won by 10 wickets
Dinton Cricket Club Ground, Dinton
Umpires: Yolanda Harris and Linda Day

- Norfolk won the toss and elected to bat.

3 May 2021
15:00
Scorecard

Hertfordshire; 83/1 (10.1 overs)	v	Huntingdonshire
Lydia Borbas 33* (39); Charlotte Aylmore 1/15 (2 overs)

No Result
Ramsey CC, Ramsey

- Huntingdonshire won the toss and elected to field.
- No further play possible due to rain.

3 May 2021
15:00
Scorecard

Cambridgeshire; 149/5 (20 overs)	v	Suffolk; 150/3 (18.5 overs)
Isabella Routledge 76 (68); Imogen Sidhu 3/32 (4 overs)		Imogen Sidhu 56 (46); Eloise Borcoski 2/19 (3 overs)

Suffolk won by 7 wickets
Woolpit CC, Woolpit

- Cambridgeshire won the toss and elected to bat.

9 May 2021
11:00
Scorecard

Buckinghamshire; 143/4 (20 overs)	v	Huntingdonshire; 51/5 (20 overs)
Ella Claridge 54 (39); Holly Hammond-Lewis 2/17 (3 overs)		Abigail Butcher 12 (22); Bethan Miles 3/2 (4 overs)

Buckinghamshire won by 92 runs
Chearsley CC, Chearsley

- Huntingdonshire won the toss and elected to field.

9 May 2021
11:00
Scorecard

Cambridgeshire; 81/8 (20 overs)	v	Norfolk; 69/7 (20 overs)
Kelly Haynes 17 (24); Maddy Browne 3/7 (3 overs)		Emily Woodhouse 18 (30); Isabella James 2/11 (4 overs)

Cambridgeshire won by 12 runs
North Runcton CC, North Runcton

- Norfolk won the toss and elected to field.

9 May 2021
11:00
Scorecard

Hertfordshire; 128/5 (20 overs)	v	Suffolk; 85/7 (20 overs)
Amelia Kemp 51 (58); Imogen Sidhu 1/22 (4 overs)		Imogen Sidhu 37 (52); Amelia Kemp 2/3 (2 overs)

Hertfordshire won by 43 runs
Woolpit CC, Woolpit
Umpires: Martin White and Rose Dovey

- Suffolk won the toss and elected to field.

9 May 2021
15:00
Scorecard

Buckinghamshire; 134/4 (20 overs)	v	Huntingdonshire; 64/7 (20 overs)
Hannah Bates 67* (60); Yarinder Buller 2/21 (3 overs)		Annabelle Woodward 21* (57); Megs Woodward 3/10 (3 overs)

Buckinghamshire won by 70 runs
Chearsley CC, Chearsley

- Huntingdonshire won the toss and elected to field.

9 May 2021
15:00
Scorecard

Cambridgeshire; 105/5 (20 overs)	v	Norfolk; 94/5 (20 overs)
Isabella Routledge 28 (42); Emily Woodhouse 2/11 (4 overs)		Daisy Eke 35* (29); Sophia Pearson 1/13 (2 overs)

Cambridgeshire won by 11 runs
North Runcton CC, North Runcton

- Norfolk won the toss and elected to field.

9 May 2021
15:00
Scorecard

Hertfordshire; 125/6 (20 overs)	v	Suffolk; 107/7 (20 overs)
Kezie Hassall 59* (41); Lottie Kent 2/14 (4 overs)		Imogen Sidhu 27 (35); Lydia Borbas 2/13 (4 overs)

Hertfordshire won by 18 runs
Woolpit CC, Woolpit
Umpires: Martin White and Rose Dovey

- Suffolk won the toss and elected to field.

16 May 2021
11:00
Scorecard

Cambridgeshire	v	Huntingdonshire

Match Abandoned
Exning Park, Exning

- No toss.
- No play possible due to rain.

16 May 2021
11:00
Scorecard

Hertfordshire	v	Buckinghamshire

Match Abandoned
Boxmoor CC, Boxmoor

- No toss.
- No play possible due to rain.

16 May 2021
11:00

Norfolk	v	Suffolk

Match Abandoned
Cromer CC, Cromer

- No toss.
- No play possible due to rain.

16 May 2021
15:00
Scorecard

Cambridgeshire	v	Huntingdonshire

Match Abandoned
Exning Park, Exning

- No toss.
- No play possible due to rain.

16 May 2021
15:00
Scorecard

Hertfordshire	v	Buckinghamshire

Match Abandoned
Boxmoor CC, Boxmoor

- No toss.
- No play possible due to rain.

16 May 2021
15:00

Norfolk	v	Suffolk

Match Abandoned
Cromer CC, Cromer

- No toss.
- No play possible due to rain.

=== East Midlands Group ===
25 April 2021
10:30
Scorecard

Nottinghamshire; 154/4 (20 overs)	v	Northamptonshire; 96/7 (20 overs)
Michaela Kirk 61* (45); Bethan Solomon 2/30 (4 overs)		Harriet Leach 30 (34); Amelia Kite 3/16 (4 overs)

Nottinghamshire won by 58 runs
Worksop College, Worksop

- Northamptonshire won the toss and elected to field.

25 April 2021
11:00
Scorecard

Shropshire; 112/6 (20 overs)	v	Derbyshire; 114/1 (16.2 overs)
Ashleigh Heath 26 (31); Suzie Ljubojevic 2/13 (3 overs)		Bethan Ellis 55* (45); Alice Dixon 1/14

Derbyshire won by 9 wickets
Denby CC, Denby
Umpires: Della Rebours and Alan Sommer

- Shropshire won the toss and elected to bat.

25 April 2021
11:00
Scorecard

Lincolnshire; 158/4 (20 overs)	v	Leicestershire and Rutland; 86/7 (20 overs)
Kathryn Bryce 65* (58); Isabelle Hudson 2/22 (3 overs)		Sophie Bennett 31* (37); Kathryn Bryce 4/8 (3 overs)

Lincolnshire won by 72 runs
Barkby United CC, Barkby
Umpires: Graham Pickering and J Naik

- Lincolnshire won the toss and chose to bat

25 April 2021
15:00
Scorecard

Derbyshire; 104/5 (20 overs)	v	Shropshire; 105/3 (19.1 overs)
Shachi Pai 34 (37); Emily Perrin 2/11 (3 overs)		Lara Jones 33* (56); Molly Dytham 2/19 (4 overs)

Shropshire won by 7 wickets
Denby CC, Denby
Umpires: Della Rebours and Alan Sommer

- Derbyshire won the toss and elected to bat.

25 April 2021
15:00
Scorecard

Lincolnshire; 83/9 (20 overs)	v	Leicestershire and Rutland; 84/4 (14.2 overs)
Sammi-Jo Boothright 16 (24); Una Paramjothy 2/5 (4 overs)		Katie Winterton 21 (15); Sammi-Jo Boothright 2/24 (3 overs)

Leicestershire and Rutland won by 6 wickets
Barkby United CC, Barkby

- Leicestershire and Rutland won the toss and elected to field.

25 April 2021
15:00
Scorecard

Nottinghamshire; 148/3 (20 overs)	v	Northamptonshire; 95/6 (20 overs)
Sonia Odedra 49* (33); Anje Lague 2/20 (4 overs)		Josie Groves 18* (17); Sophie Munro 3/10 (4 overs)

Nottinghamshire won by 53 runs
Worksop College, Worksop

- Northamptonshire won the toss and elected to field.

3 May 2021
10:30
Scorecard

Lincolnshire; 105/7 (20 overs)	v	Nottinghamshire
Bethany Harmer 47 (41); Sophie Munro 2/16 (4 overs)

No Result
Sleaford CC, Sleaford
Umpires: Nick Wilson and Ian Hoffler

- Nottinghamshire won the toss and elected to field.
- No further play possible due to rain.

3 May 2021
11:00
Scorecard

Leicestershire and Rutland; 26/0 (4 overs)	v	Derbyshire
Tyla Davison 12* (17)

No Result
Spondon CC, Spondon
Umpires: Ian Thornewill and Terry Dorr

- Derbyshire won the toss and elected to field.
- No further play possible due to rain.

3 May 2021
11:00

Shropshire	v	Northamptonshire

Match Abandoned
Worfield CC, Worfield

- No toss.
- No play possible due to rain.

3 May 2021
15:00
Scorecard

Derbyshire	v	Leicestershire and Rutland

Match Abandoned
Spondon CC, Spondon
Umpires: Ian Thornewill and Terry Dorr

- No toss.
- No play possible due to rain.

3 May 2021
15:00
Scorecard

Lincolnshire	v	Nottinghamshire

Match Abandoned
Sleaford CC, Sleaford
Umpires: Nick Wilson and Ian Hoffler

- No toss.
- No play possible due to rain.

3 May 2021
15:00

Shropshire	v	Northamptonshire

Match Abandoned
Worfield CC, Worfield

- No toss.
- No play possible due to rain.

9 May 2021
11:00
Scorecard

Nottinghamshire; 80/9 (20 overs)	v	Leicestershire and Rutland; 74/4 (20 overs)
Sophie Munro 16 (19); Nancy Harman 4/10 (4 overs)		Grace Ballinger 29* (53); Amelia Kite 1/8 (3 overs)

Nottinghamshire won by 6 runs
Market Overton CC, Market Overton

- Leicestershire and Rutland won the toss and elected to field.

9 May 2021
11:00

Lincolnshire	v	Shropshire

Match Abandoned
Spalding Town CC, Spalding

- No toss.
- No play possible due to rain.

9 May 2021
11:00
Scorecard

Northamptonshire; 98/3 (20 overs)	v	Derbyshire; 95/8 (20 overs)
Bethany Ascott 26 (35); Eden Collier 2/16 (4 overs)		Natasha Allen 30 (28); Natasha Miller 2/14 (4 overs)

Northamptonshire won by 3 runs
Desborough Town CC, Desborough

- Derbyshire won the toss and elected to field.

9 May 2021
15:00
Scorecard

Nottinghamshire; 103/7 (20 overs)	v	Leicestershire and Rutland; 84/5 (20 overs)
Teresa Graves 40 (38); Tyla Davison 2/7 (2 overs)		Nancy Harman 15 (37); Amy Gauvrit 3/15 (4 overs)

Nottinghamshire won by 19 runs
Market Overton CC, Market Overton

- Leicestershire and Rutland won the toss and chose to field.

9 May 2021
15:00

Lincolnshire	v	Shropshire

Match Abandoned
Spalding Town CC, Spalding

- No toss.
- No play possible due to rain.

9 May 2021
15:00
Scorecard

Derbyshire; 87/5 (20 overs)	v	Northamptonshire; 63 (19 overs)
Bethan Ellis 34 (34); Josie Groves 3/14 (4 overs)		Anje Lague 11* (10); Suzie Ljubojevic 3/7 (4 overs)

Derbyshire won by 24 runs
Desborough Town CC, Desborough

- Northamptonshire won the toss and elected to field.

16 May 2021
10:30
Scorecard

Nottinghamshire; 135/6 (20 overs)	v	Derbyshire; 105/2 (20 overs
Yvonne Graves 42 (36); Bethan Ellis 3/21 (4 overs)		Bethan Ellis 49* (57); Sonia Odedra 2/12 (4 overs)

Nottinghamshire won by 30 runs
Collingham CC, Collingham

- Nottinghamshire won the toss and elected to bat.

16 May 2021
11:00
Scorecard

Lincolnshire; 124/3 (20 overs)	v	Northamptonshire; 89/9 (20 overs)
Kathryn Bryce 60 (59); Summer Keightley 1/13 (2 overs)		Laura Crofts 28 (32); Alicia Presland 4/16 (3 overs)

Lincolnshire won by 35 runs
Kettering Town CC, Kettering
Umpires: Pratik Rachh and Ray Medland

- Northamptonshire won the toss and elected to field.

16 May 2021
11:00
Scorecard

Shropshire; 86/7 (20 overs)	v	Leicestershire and Rutland; 87/3 (18.1 overs)
Harriet Shuker 37 (35); Isabelle Hudson 2/15 (4 overs)		Nancy Harman 34 (44); Emily Perrin 1/8 (3 overs)

Leicestershire and Rutland won by 7 wickets
Stratford CC, Stratford-upon-Avon

- Leicestershire and Rutland won the toss and elected to field.

16 May 2021
15:00
Scorecard

Northamptonshire; 61 (19.2 overs)	v	Lincolnshire; 62/2 (9.5 overs)
Laura Crofts 19 (22); Bethany Harmer 3/11 (4 overs)		Bethany Harmer 37* (36); Caitlyn Connelly 1/14 (3 overs)

Lincolnshire won by 8 wickets
Kettering Town CC, Kettering
Umpires: Pratik Rachh and Ray Medland

16 May 2021
15:00
Scorecard

Derbyshire; 66 (18.4 overs)	v	Nottinghamshire
Megan Pittman 23* (31); Rebecca Widdowson 4/10 (3 overs)

No Result
Collingham CC, Collingham

- Derbyshire won the toss and elected to bat.
- No further play possible due to rain.

16 May 2021
15:00
Scorecard

Leicestershire and Rutland; 65 (19 overs)	v	Shropshire; 66/1 (15.3 overs)
Nancy Harman 27 (39); Emily Perrin 3/14 (4 overs)		Lara Jones 21* (47); Lucy Weston 1/11 (3 overs)

Shropshire won by 9 wickets
Stratford CC, Stratford-upon-Avon

- Shropshire won the toss and elected to field.

=== North Group ===
25 April 2021
11:00
Scorecard

Yorkshire; 174/5 (20 overs)	v	Cumbria; 75/7 (20 overs)
Hollie Armitage 64 (37); Sarah Smith 2/9 (2 overs)		Rebecca Duckworth 23 (56); Hollie Armitage 3/7 (4 overs)

Yorkshire won by 99 runs
Arnside CC, Arnside
Umpires: A Bargh and D Clough

- Yorkshire won the toss and elected to bat.

25 April 2021
11:00
Scorecard

Scotland A 111/8 (20 overs)	v	North Representative XI; 112/2 (16.3 overs)
Megan McColl 20 (16); Liberty Heap 2/17 (3 overs)		Adrianna Darlow 33 (44); Abbie Hogg 1/20 (4 overs)

North Representative XI won by 8 wickets
Leyland CC, Leyland

- Scotland A won the toss and elected to bat.

25 April 2021
11:00
Scorecard

Lancashire; 178/3 (20 overs)	v	North East Warriors; 61/8 (20 overs)
Emma Lamb 119* (73); Lizzie Scott 1/18 (2 overs)		Helen Fenby 14* (20); Alex Hartley 3/6 (4 overs)

Lancashire won by 117 runs
Burnopfield CC, Burnopfield

- Lancashire won the toss and elected to bat.

25 April 2021
15:00
Scorecard

Cumbria; 121/3 (20 overs)	v	Yorkshire; 122/1 (13.4 overs)
Laura Marshall 51 (44); Hollie Armitage 2/18 (4 overs)		Hollie Armitage 71* (41); Grace Michell 1/23 (4 overs)

Yorkshire won by 9 wickets
Arnside CC, Arnside
Umpires: A Bargh and D Clough

- Cumbria won the toss and elected to bat.

25 April 2021
15:00
Scorecard

Scotland A 99 (19.2 overs)	v	North Representative XI; 100/4 (17.2 overs)
Katie McGill 18 (14); Sophia Turner 2/13 (3 overs)		Liberty Heap 35 (39); Niamh Robertson-Jack 2/35 (4 overs)

North Representative XI won by 6 wickets
Leyland CC, Leyland
Umpires: K Boyle and David Challenor

- Scotland A won the toss and elected to bat.

25 April 2021
15:00
Scorecard

Lancashire; 146/2 (20 overs)	v	North East Warriors; 86/8 (20 overs)
Georgie Boyce 96* (73); Helen Fenby 1/28 (4 overs)		Ami Campbell 19 (17); Emma Lamb 3/17 (4 overs)

Lancashire won by 60 runs
Burnopfield CC, Burnopfield

- Lancashire won the toss and elected to bat.

3 May 2021
11:00
Scorecard

Cumbria	v	North Representative XI

Match Abandoned
Furness CC, Barrow-in-Furness

- No toss.
- No play possible due to rain.

3 May 2021
11:00
Scorecard

Lancashire	v	Scotland A

Match Abandoned
Carnforth CC, Carnforth

- No toss.
- No play possible due to rain.

3 May 2021
11:00
Scorecard

Yorkshire; 124/1 (11 overs)	v	North East Warriors
Bess Heath 52*; Laura Ellison 1/9 (2 overs)

No Result
St George's Road, Harrogate
Umpires: Joanne Ibbotson and Jane Pratt

- Yorkshire won the toss and elected to bat.
- No further play possible due to rain.

3 May 2021
15:00
Scorecard

Cumbria	v	North Representative XI

Match Abandoned
Furness CC, Barrow-in-Furness

- No toss.
- No play possible due to rain.

3 May 2021
15:00
Scorecard

Lancashire	v	Scotland A

Match Abandoned
Carnforth CC, Carnforth

- No toss.
- No play possible due to rain.

3 May 2021
15:00
Scorecard

Yorkshire	v	North East Warriors

Match Abandoned
St George's Road, Harrogate

- No toss.
- No play possible due to rain.

9 May 2021
11:00
Scorecard

Cumbria; 62 (18.3 overs)	v	Scotland A 63/1 (9.3 overs)
Rebecca Duckworth 26 (41); Abbie Hogg 3/7 (2.3 overs)

Scotland A won by 9 wickets
The Priory, Lanercost

- Scotland A won the toss and elected to field.
- Full match details are unavailable.

9 May 2021
11:00
Scorecard

North East Warriors; 173/1 (20 overs)	v	North Representative XI; 88/8 (20 overs)
Ami Campbell 70 (37); Alex MacDonald 1/28 (4 overs)		Seren Smale 23 (30); Meg Jones 3/6 (4 overs)

North East Warriors won by 85 runs
Brandon Cricket Ground, Brandon
Umpires: Peter Connor and Mark Pacitto

- North East Warriors won the toss and elected to bat.

9 May 2021
11:00
Scorecard

Yorkshire	v	Lancashire

Match Abandoned
Harrogate CC, Harrogate

- No toss.
- No play possible due to rain.

9 May 2021
15:00
Scorecard

Scotland A 121/9 (20 overs)	v	Cumbria; 107/5 (20 overs)
Katie McGill 25 (25); Grace Michell 2/11 (3 overs)		Rebecca Duckworth 40* (45); Megan McColl 1/12 (3 overs)

Scotland A won by 14 runs
The Priory, Lanercost

- Scotland A won the toss and elected to bat.

9 May 2021
15:00
Scorecard

North East Warriors; 122/2 (20 overs)	v	North Representative XI; 123/5 (19.1 overs)
Ami Campbell 70 (65); Sophia Turner 1/20 (4 overs)		Alex MacDonald 50 (46); Ellie Tiffin 2/26 (4 overs)

North Representative XI won by 5 wickets
Brandon Cricket Ground, Brandon
Umpires: Mark Pacitto and Peter Connor

- North East Warriors won the toss and elected to bat.

9 May 2021
15:00
Scorecard

Yorkshire	v	Lancashire

Match Abandoned
Harrogate CC, Harrogate

- No toss.
- No play possible due to rain.

16 May 2021
11:00
Scorecard

Lancashire; 179/2 (20 overs)	v	Cumbria; 71/6 (20 overs)
Emma Lamb 63 (38); Grace Johnson 1/27 (4 overs)		Seren Smale 22 (27); Hannah Jones 2/8 (4 overs)

Lancashire won by 108 runs
Widnes CC, Widnes

- Cumbria won the toss and elected to field.

16 May 2021
11:00
Scorecard

Scotland A 85 (18.3 overs)	v	North East Warriors; 76 (19.5 overs)
Ellen Watson 18 (19); Ellie Tiffin 4/7 (2.3 overs)		Hayley Falla 14* (14); Megan McColl 2/6 (2 overs)

Scotland A won by 9 runs
Alnmouth & Lesbury CC, Lesbury

- Scotland A won the toss and elected to bat.

16 May 2021
11:00
Scorecard

Yorkshire	v	North Representative XI

Match Abandoned
Harrogate CC, Harrogate

- No toss.
- No play possible due to rain.

16 May 2021
15:00
Scorecard

Lancashire; 176/5 (20 overs)	v	Cumbria; 38/6 (16 overs)
Eleanor Threlkeld 52 (41); Grace Johnson 2/22 (4 overs)		Brianna Rae 8 (9); Hannah Jones 2/5 (3 overs)

Lancashire won by 100 runs (DLS)
Widnes CC, Widnes

- Lancashire won the toss and elected to bat.
- Cumbria target revised to 139 from 16 overs due to rain.

16 May 2021
15:00
Scorecard

Scotland A 94 (20 overs)	v	North East Warriors; 90/9 (20 overs)
Katherine Fraser 18 (17); Laura Ellison 3/16 (3 overs)		Laura Ellison 24* (43); Abtaha Maqsood 2/3 (4 overs)

Scotland A won by 4 runs
Alnmouth & Lesbury CC, Lesbury

- Scotland A won the toss and elected to bat.

16 May 2021
15:00
Scorecard

Yorkshire	v	North Representative XI

Match Abandoned
Harrogate CC, Harrogate

- No toss.
- No play possible due to rain.

=== South East Group ===
25 April 2021
11:00
Scorecard

Middlesex; 157/3 (20 overs)	v	Hampshire; 117/9 (20 overs)
Cordelia Griffith 73 (56); Emily Windsor 1/22 (3 overs)		Ella Chandler 20 (17); Bhavika Gajipra 3/17 (4 overs)

Middlesex won by 40 runs
Mill Hill School, Mill Hill, London
Umpires: M Juniper and J McKetty

- Middlesex won the toss and elected to bat.

25 April 2021
11:00
Scorecard

Kent; 195/4 (20 overs)	v	Surrey; 145/9 (20 overs)
Grace Scrivens 94* (62); Claudie Cooper 1/10 (2 overs)		Aylish Cranstone 36 (32); Tash Farrant 2/26 (4 overs)

Kent won by 50 runs
Chipstead Coulsdon & Walcountians CC, Chipstead
Umpires: Lizzy Condor and Stuart Todd

- Surrey won the toss and elected to field.

25 April 2021
11:00
Scorecard

Essex; 112/5 (20 overs)	v	Sussex; 115/3 (19.3 overs)
Jessica Bird 31 (38); Tara Norris 2/10 (4 overs)		Isabelle Collis 32 (48); Grace Poole 2/23 (4 overs)

Sussex won by 7 wickets
Brighton Aldridge Community Academy Ground, Brighton
Umpires: Julia Jarvis and D Holden

- Essex won the toss and chose to bat.

25 April 2021
15:00
Scorecard

Hampshire; 93/8 (20 overs)	v	Middlesex; 94/7 (18 overs)
Alice Monaghan 26* (31); Bhavika Gajipra 3/16 (4 overs)		Naomi Dattani 24 (26); Finty Trussler 3/20 (4 overs)

Middlesex won by 3 wickets
Mill Hill School, Mill Hill, London
Umpires: M Juniper and J McKetty

- Hampshire won the toss and elected to bat.

25 April 2021
15:00
Scorecard

Surrey; 152/5 (20 overs)	v	Kent; 153/5 (20 overs)
Kirstie White 40 (32); Megan Belt 2/31 (4 overs)		Alice Davidson-Richards 63* (45); Hannah Jones 2/19 (4 overs)

Kent won by 5 wickets
Chipstead Coulsdon & Walcountians CC, Chipstead
Umpires: Lizzie Conder and Shaun Todd

- Surrey won the toss and elected to bat.

25 April 2021
15:00
Scorecard

Essex; 68 (14.5 overs)	v	Sussex; 69/1 (8.1 overs)
Kelly Castle 19 (18); Daisy Gibb 3/4 (1.5 overs)		Isabelle Collis 28 (22); Esmae MacGregor 1/14 (3.1 overs)

Sussex won by 9 wickets
Brighton Aldridge Community Academy Ground, Brighton

- Essex won the toss and elected to bat.

3 May 2021
11:00
Scorecard

Surrey; 131/5 (20 overs)	v	Essex; 116/6 (20 overs)
Alice Capsey 51 (43); Kelly Castle 2/16 (4 overs)		Scarlett Hughes 46 (51); Amy Gordon 1/25 (4 overs)

Surrey won by 15 runs
Garon Park, Southend-on-Sea
Umpires: Angela Tuff and Tracey Murphy

- Surrey won the toss and elected to bat.

3 May 2021
11:00
Scorecard

Kent; 150/3 (20 overs)	v	Middlesex; 130/7 (20 overs)
Sarah Bryce 63* (49); Gayatri Gole 2/24 (4 overs)		Cordelia Griffith 60 (45); Grace Scrivens 2/10 (3 overs)

Kent won by 20 runs
County Cricket Ground, Beckenham
Umpires: Mel Juniper and Julia Jarvis

- Kent won the toss and elected to bat.

3 May 2021
11:00
Scorecard

Hampshire; 114/8 (20 overs)	v	Sussex; 67 (18 overs)
Ella Chandler 41 (50); Mary Taylor 3/21 (4 overs)		Sarah Taylor 28 (24); Finty Trussler 4/12 (4 overs)

Hampshire won by 47 runs
Brighton Aldridge Community Academy Ground, Brighton
Umpires: Sarah Bartlett and R Sage

- Hampshire won the toss and elected to bat.

3 May 2021
15:00
Scorecard

Essex; 116/4 (20 overs)	v	Surrey; 117/6 (18.1 overs)
Catherine Dalton 61 (57); Danielle Gregory 2/21 (4 overs)		Kira Chathli 36 (43); Grace Poole 2/16 (3.1 overs)

Surrey won by 4 wickets
Garon Park, Southend-on-Sea
Umpires: Angela Tuff and Tracey Murphy

- Surrey won the toss and elected to field.

3 May 2021
15:00
Scorecard

Middlesex; 131 (19.3 overs)	v	Kent; 135/3 (19.4 overs)
Cordelia Griffith 37 (26); Kirstie Gordon 4/17 (4 overs)		Sarah Bryce 59* (57); Sonali Patel 2/17 (3 overs)

Kent won by 7 wickets
County Cricket Ground, Beckenham
Umpires: Julia Jarvis and Mel Juniper

- Kent won the toss and elected to field.

3 May 2021
15:00
Scorecard

Sussex; 90/5 (20 overs)	v	Hampshire; 91/1 (14.5 overs)
Sarah Taylor 29* (28); Finty Trussler 3/13 (4 overs)		Fi Morris 47* (41); Cassidy McCarthy 1/11 (2 overs)

Hampshire won by 9 wickets
Brighton Aldridge Community Academy Ground, Brighton
Umpires: R Sage and Sarah Bartlett

- Hampshire won the toss and elected to field.

9 May 2021
11:00
Scorecard

Essex; 74 (19.3 overs)	v	Kent; 75/5 (13.5 overs)
Hayley Brown 16 (20); Kalea Moore 3/8 (2.3 overs)		Grace Scrivens 23* (22); Katie Midwood 2/23 (4 overs)

Kent won by 5 wickets
County Cricket Ground, Chelmsford
Umpires: Angela Tuff and Tracey Murphy

- Essex won the toss and elected to bat.

9 May 2021
11:00
Scorecard

Middlesex; 90/6 (20 overs)	v	Sussex; 91/4 (18.5 overs)
Naomi Dattani 35 (39); Chiara Green 2/8 (4 overs)		Ella McCaughan 40* (53); Bhavika Gajipra 3/17 (4 overs)

Sussex won by 6 wickets
Mill Hill School, Mill Hill, London

- Middlesex won the toss and elected to bat.

9 May 2021
12:30
Scorecard

Surrey; 104 (20 overs)	v	Hampshire; 100/7 (20 overs)
Amy Gordon 33 (32); Finty Trussler 3/15 (4 overs)		Charlie Dean 46* (54); Claudie Cooper 2/15 (3 overs)

Surrey won by 4 runs
Totton and Eling CC, Totton and Eling
Umpires: Sarah Bartlett and Sophie McLelland

- Surrey won the toss and elected to bat.

9 May 2021
15:00
Scorecard

Kent; 140/5 (20 overs	v	Essex; 108/8 (20 overs)
Alice Davidson-Richards 60* (45); Emma Jones 1/7 (2 overs)		Catherine Dalton 38 (49); Grace Gibbs 5/11 (4 overs)

Kent won by 32 runs
County Cricket Ground, Chelmsford
Umpires: Angela Tuff and Tracey Murphy

- Essex won the toss and elected to field.

9 May 2021
15:00
Scorecard

Middlesex; 90/9 (20 overs)	v	Sussex; 74/6 (20 overs)
Kate Coppack 15 (12); Cassidy McCarthy 4/28 (4 overs)		Sarah Taylor 21 (34); Katie Wolfe 2/7 (4 overs)

Middlesex won by 16 runs
Mill Hill School, Mill Hill, London

- Middlesex won the toss and elected to bat.

9 May 2021
16:00
Scorecard

Hampshire; 120/5 (20 overs)	v	Surrey; 90/9 (16 overs)
Sophie Mitchelmore 43* (42); Alice Capsey 2/18 (4 overs)		Kirstie White 25 (26); Finty Trussler 3/16 (3 overs)

Hampshire won by 11 runs (DLS)
Totton and Eling CC, Totton and Eling
Umpires: Sarah Bartlett and Sophie McLelland

- Hampshire won the toss and elected to bat.
- Surrey target revised to 102 from 16 overs due to rain.

16 May 2021
11:00

Hampshire	v	Essex

Match Abandoned
Totton and Eling CC, Totton and Eling

- No toss.
- No play possible due to rain.

16 May 2021
11:00
Scorecard

Middlesex; 76/4 (15 overs)	v	Surrey; 36/2 (3.3 overs)
Gemma Marriott 51* (41); Alice Capsey 2/7 (3 overs)		Alice Capsey 17* (11); Bhavika Gajipra 1/5 (1 over)

Surrey won by 8 wickets (DLS)
Old Whitgiftians CC, South Croydon
Umpires: David Brown and Tracey Murphy

- Surrey won the toss and elected to field.
- Surrey target revised to 33 from 5 overs due to rain.

16 May 2021
13:00
Scorecard

Kent	v	Sussex

Match Abandoned
Mote Park, Maidstone
Umpires: Mel Juniper and Angela Tuff

- No toss.
- No play possible due to rain.

16 May 2021
15:00

Hampshire	v	Essex

Match Abandoned
Totton and Eling CC, Totton and Eling

- No toss.
- No play possible due to rain.

16 May 2021
15:00
Scorecard

Middlesex; 65/4 (10.2 overs)	v	Surrey
Naomi Dattani 35 (24); Alice Capsey 2/14 (4 overs)

No Result
Old Whitgiftians CC, South Croydon
Umpires: David Brown and Tracey Murphy

- Middlesex won the toss and elected to bat.
- No further play possible due to rain.

16 May 2021
16:00
Scorecard

Kent	v	Sussex

Match Abandoned
Mote Park, Maidstone
Umpires: Angela Tuff and Mel Juniper

- No toss.
- No play possible due to rain.

=== South West Group ===
25 April 2021
11:00
Scorecard

Devon; 140/5 (20 overs)	v	Oxfordshire; 67/9 (20 overs)
Emma Corney 42 (37); Abigale Norgrove 2/20 (4 overs)		Abigale Norgrove 15 (20); Sophie Florides 3/7 (4 overs)

Devon won by 73 runs
Mount Kelly School, Tavistock

- Oxfordshire won the toss and elected to field.

25 April 2021
11:00
Scorecard

Dorset; 166/5 (20 overs)	v	Wiltshire; 109/4 (20 overs)
Victoria Pack 79* (57); Ellie Thompson 1/14 (3 overs)		Emily Smith 37 (46); Ceri Harris 1/9 (3 overs)

Dorset won by 57 runs
Broadstone CC, Broadstone

- Wiltshire won the toss and elected to field.

25 April 2021
11:00
Scorecard

Cornwall; 76/6 (20 overs)	v	Gloucestershire; 77/3 (16.4 overs)
Caitlin Burnett 40 (40); Lily Day 4/4 (4 overs)		Alice Hill 31 (47); Elsie Pritchard 1/11 (2.4 overs)

Gloucestershire won by 7 wickets
College Ground, Cheltenham
Umpires: R Scott and N Stoneman

- Gloucestershire won the toss and elected to field.

25 April 2021
15:00
Scorecard

Devon; 167/5 (20 overs)	v	Oxfordshire; 80 (19.4 overs)
Izzy Bunn 68 (57); Georgia Haworth 2/21 (4 overs)		Lottie Oxton 19 (14); Steph Hutchins 3/6 (2.4 overs)

Devon won by 87 runs
Mount Kelly School, Tavistock

- Devon won the toss and elected to bat.

25 April 2021
15:00
Scorecard

Dorset; 192/3 (20 overs)	v	Wiltshire; 141/1 (20 overs)
Victoria Pack 115* (67); Emily Smith 1/11 (2 overs)		Emily Smith 61* (64); Tilly Churchill 1/27 (3 overs)

Dorset won by 51 runs
Broadstone CC, Broadstone

- Wiltshire won the toss and elected to field.

25 April 2021
15:00
Scorecard

Gloucestershire; 125/1 (20 overs)	v	Cornwall; 96/8 (20 overs)
Chloe Skelton 70* (65); Tegan Smith 1/19 (3 overs)		Rebecca Odgers 28 (18); Sidra Khan 3/24 (3 overs)

Gloucestershire won by 29 runs
College Ground, Cheltenham

- Cornwall won the toss and elected to field.

3 May 2021
11:00
Scorecard

Cornwall	v	Dorset

Cornwall won by walkover
Boconnoc CC, Boconnoc

- No toss.
- Dorset conceded; Cornwall awarded 4 points.

3 May 2021
10:00
Scorecard

Gloucestershire; 108/4 (20 overs)	v	Oxfordshire
Chloe Skelton 34 (45); Abigale Norgorve 1/16 (4 overs)

No Result
College Ground, Cheltenham
Umpires: N Batchelor and Kevin Carden

- Oxfordshire won the toss and elected to field.
- No further play possible due to rain.

3 May 2021
11:00
Scorecard

Devon; 164/3 (20 overs)	v	Wiltshire; 43/8 (20 overs)
Caitlin O'Keefe 41* (31); Vickie Hathway 2/17 (3 overs)		Ellie Rumble 13 (38); Steph Hutchins 3/2 (2 overs)

Devon won by 121 runs
Corsham CC, Corsham

- Wiltshire won the toss and elected to field.

3 May 2021
15:00
Scorecard

Cornwall	v	Dorset

Cornwall won by walkover
Boconnoc CC, Boconnoc

- No toss.
- Dorset conceded; Cornwall awarded 4 points.

3 May 2021
15:00
Scorecard

Gloucestershire	v	Oxfordshire

Match Abandoned
College Ground, Cheltenham
Umpires: N Batchelor and Kevin Carden

- No toss.
- No play possible due to rain.

3 May 2021
15:00
Scorecard

Wiltshire; 46/7 (15 overs)	v	Devon; 50/0 (4.4 overs)
Isla Thomson 14 (17); Sophie Florides 2/4 (3 overs)		Ruby Davis 21* (14)

Devon won by 10 wickets
Corsham CC, Corsham

- Devon won the toss and elected to field.
- Match reduced to 15 overs per side.

9 May 2021
11:00
Scorecard

Devon; 79/7 (20 overs)	v	Gloucestershire; 83/6 (19.3 overs)
Steph Hutchins 22 (36); Alice Hill 2/9 (2 overs)		Chloe Skelton 48* (50); Sophie Florides 4/10 (3 overs)

Gloucestershire won by 4 wickets
Sidmouth CC, Sidmouth
Umpires: Marilyn MacQueen and Christopher Sleep

- Gloucestershire won the toss and elected to field.

9 May 2021
11:00
Scorecard

Dorset	v	Oxfordshire

Match Abandoned
Chapel Gate Cricket Pitch, Bournemouth

- No toss.
- No play possible due to rain.

9 May 2021
11:00
Scorecard

Cornwall; 84/7 (20 overs)	v	Wiltshire; 53 (18.5 overs)
Millie Sweet 27* (29); Ilsa Thomson 3/22 (3 overs)		Vickie Hathway 16* (25); Lucie Oakley 3/12 (4 overs)

Cornwall won by 31 runs
Pinkney Park, Sherston

- Wiltshire won the toss and elected to field.

9 May 2021
15:00
Scorecard

Devon; 85/5 (20 overs)	v	Gloucestershire; 86/3 (18.2 overs)
Georgia Read 21 (32); Alice Hill 2/14 (4 overs)		Chloe Skelton 35 (31); Charlie Phillips 1/12 (4 overs)

Gloucestershire won by 7 wickets
Sidmouth CC, Sidmouth
Umpires: Marilyn MacQueen and Chris Sleep

- Devon won the toss and elected to bat.

9 May 2021
15:00
Scorecard

Dorset	v	Oxfordshire

Match Abandoned
Chapel Gate Cricket Pitch, Bournemouth

- No toss.
- No play possible due to rain.

9 May 2021
15:00
Scorecard

Wiltshire; 65/9 (20 overs)	v	Cornwall; 66/2 (9.4 overs)
Vickie Hathway 12 (28); Bernadette Forge 2/8 (4 overs)		Rebecca Odgers 22 (14); Anne-Mae Shearn 1/16 (3 overs)

Cornwall won by 8 wickets
Pinkney Park, Sherston

- Cornwall won the toss and elected to field.

16 May 2021
11:00
Scorecard

Cornwall	v	Devon

Match Abandoned
Launceston CC, Launceston

- No toss.
- No play possible due to rain.

16 May 2021
11:00
Scorecard

Gloucestershire	v	Dorset

Match Abandoned
College Ground, Cheltenham

- No toss.
- No play possible due to rain.

16 May 2021
11:00
Scorecard

Wiltshire; 76/7 (20 overs)	v	Oxfordshire; 77/3 (11.5 overs)
Pippa Brown 16 (11); Chloe Westbury 3/6 (2 overs)		Eleanor Ingram 51* (42); Anna-Mae Shearn 2/6 (3 overs)

Oxfordshire won by 7 wickets
Bicester & North Oxford CC, Bicester

- Oxfordshire won the toss and elected to field.

16 May 2021
15:00
Scorecard

Cornwall	v	Devon

Match Abandoned
Launceston CC, Launceston

- No toss.
- No play possible due to rain.

16 May 2021
15:00
Scorecard

Gloucestershire	v	Dorset

Match Abandoned
College Ground, Cheltenham

- No toss.
- No play possible due to rain.

16 May 2021
15:00
Scorecard

Oxfordshire; 166/3 (20 overs)	v	Wiltshire; 59/9 (20 overs)
Carla Wood 62* (61); Holly Evans 1/11 (2 overs)		Emily Smith 11 (23); Sana Kassey 3/3 (4 overs)

Oxfordshire won by 107 runs
Bicester & North Oxford CC, Bicester

- Oxfordshire won the toss and elected to bat.

=== West Midlands Group ===
25 April 2021
11:00
Scorecard

Berkshire; 102/7 (20 overs)	v	Worcestershire; 103/5 (14.1 overs)
Mia Rogers 30 (37); Flora Bertwistle 4/15 (3 overs)		Milly Home 44 (31); Amanda Potgieter 3/6 (2 overs)

Worcestershire won by 5 wickets
Falkland CC, Newbury

- Worcestershire won the toss and elected to field.

25 April 2021
11:00
Scorecard

Warwickshire; 121/9 (20 overs)	v	Wales; 97/9 (20 overs)
Marie Kelly 40 (38); Ffion Wynne 4/16 (4 overs)		Georgia Parfitt 29 (42); Hannah Baker 4/14 (4 overs)

Warwickshire won by 24 runs
Edgbaston Foundation Ground, Birmingham
Umpires: Sue Redfern and Nigel Smith

- Warwickshire won the toss and elected to bat.

25 April 2021
11:00
Scorecard

Staffordshire; 127/8 (20 overs)	v	Somerset; 128/4 (18.4 overs)
Stephanie Butler 30 (23); Georgia Hennessy 3/24 (4 overs)		Georgia Hennessy 61 (50); Stephanie Butler 2/22 (4 overs)

Somerset won by 6 wickets
Fordhouses CC, Fordhouses, Wolverhampton
Umpires: Grace Bambury and Nicola Owen

- Staffordshire won the toss and elected to bat.

25 April 2021
15:00
Scorecard

Worcestershire; 156/2 (20 overs)	v	Berkshire; 149/2 (20 overs)
Milly Home 88* (63); Amelia Humphrey 1/13 (2 overs)		Amanda Potgieter 61* (57); Hannah Hardwick 2/26 (3 overs)

Worcestershire won by 7 runs
Falkland CC, Newbury

- Worcestershire won the toss and chose to bat.

25 April 2021
15:00
Scorecard

Wales; 105/6 (20 overs)	v	Warwickshire; 108/2 (13.5 overs)
Lauren Parfitt 31 (29); Hannah Baker 2/12 (2 overs)		Marie Kelly 37* (20); Lauren Parfitt 1/20 (3 overs)

Warwickshire won by 8 wickets
Edgbaston Foundation Ground, Birmingham
Umpires: Sue Redfern and Nigel Smith

- Wales won the toss and elected to bat.

25 April 2021
15:00
Scorecard

Somerset; 161/3 (20 overs)	v	Staffordshire; 128/5 (20 overs)
Georgia Hennessy 78 (54); Becky Cripwell 2/15 (2 overs)		Poppy Davies 59 (49); Georgia Hennessy 2/20 (4 overs)

Somerset won by 33 runs
Fordhouses CC, Fordhouses, Wolverhampton
Umpires: Grace Bambury and Nicola Owen

- Somerset won the toss and elected to bat.

3 May 2021
11:00
Scorecard

Somerset; 104/7 (20 overs)	v	Wales; 106/3 (17.1 overs)
Sophie Luff 28 (39); Lauren Parfitt 3/16 (4 overs)		Lauren Parfitt 70* (49); Lorraine Szczepanski 2/4 (4 overs)

Wales won by 7 wickets
Weston-super-Mare CC, Weston-super-Mare

- Wales won the toss and elected to field.

3 May 2021
11:00
Scorecard

Warwickshire	v	Berkshire

Match Abandoned
Edgbaston Foundation Ground, Birmingham
Umpires: Nicola Owen and Angela Boote

- No toss.
- No play possible due to rain.

3 May 2021
11:00
Scorecard

Staffordshire; 73/4 (12 overs)	v	Worcestershire
Poppy Davies 20* (22); Emily Arlott 2/15 (3 overs)

No result
Bromsgrove CC, Bromsgrove

- Worcestershire won the toss and elected to field.
- No further play possible due to rain.

3 May 2021
15:00
Scorecard

Wales; 114/9 (20 overs)	v	Somerset; 115/3 (17 overs)
Lauren Parfitt 37 (41); Georgia Hennessy 3/18 (4 overs)		Sophie Luff 57* (46); Seren Hughes 1/20 (3 overs)

Somerset won by 7 wickets
Weston-super-Mare CC, Weston-super-Mare

- Somerset won by 7 wickets

3 May 2021
15:00
Scorecard

Warwickshire	v	Berkshire

Match Abandoned
Edgbaston Foundation Ground, Birmingham
Umpires: Nicola Owen and Angela Boote

- No toss.
- No play possible due to rain.

3 May 2021
15:00
Scorecard

Worcestershire	v	Staffordshire

Match Abandoned
Bromsgrove CC, Bromsgrove

- No toss.
- No play possible due to rain.

9 May 2021
11:00
Scorecard

Wales	v	Staffordshire

Match Abandoned
Spytty Park, Newport

- No toss.
- No play possible due to rain.

9 May 2021
11:00
Scorecard

Somerset; 126/5 (20 overs)	v	Berkshire; 54 (18.3 overs)
Sophie Luff 59 (50); Laura Bailey 2/32 (4 overs)		Lauren Bell 16 (24); Nicole Harvey 4/2 (4 overs)

Somerset won by 72 runs
Taunton School, Taunton
Umpires: Andy Wright and Yvonne Dolphin

- Berkshire won the toss and elected to field.

9 May 2021
11:00
Scorecard

Warwickshire; 155/2 (20 overs)	v	Worcestershire; 129/4 (20 overs)
Evelyn Jones 66 (63); Ellie Anderson 1/19 (4 overs)		Clare Boycott 40 (34); Emily Churms 2/23 (3 overs)

Warwickshire won by 26 runs
Edgbaston Foundation Ground, Birmingham
Umpires: Sue Redfern and Grace Bambury

- Worcestershire won the toss and elected to field.

9 May 2021
15:00
Scorecard

Wales	v	Staffordshire

Match Abandoned
Spytty Park, Newport

- No toss.
- No play possible due to rain.

9 May 2021
15:00
Scorecard

Berkshire; 65 (19.1 overs)	v	Somerset; 66/0 (7 overs)
Lauren Bell 18 (25); Lorraine Szczepanski 4/8 (4 overs)		Georgia Hennessy 38* (27)

Somerset won by 10 wickets
Taunton School, Taunton
Umpires: Andy Wright and Yvonne Dolphin

- Berkshire won the toss and chose to bat.

9 May 2021
15:00
Scorecard

Warwickshire; 181/5 (20 overs)	v	Worcestershire; 68 (16 overs)
Evelyn Jones 39 (32); Jenny Cotham 2/14 (2 overs)		Charis Pavely 20 (33); Georgia Davis 2/9 (2 overs)

Warwickshire won by 113 runs
Edgbaston Foundation Ground, Birmingham
Umpires: Sue Redfern and Grace Bambury

- Worcestershire won the toss and elected to field.

16 May 2021
11:00
Scorecard

Berkshire	v	Wales

Match Abandoned
Falkland CC, Newbury

- Berkshire won the toss and elected to bat.
- No play possible due to rain.

16 May 2021
11:00
Scorecard

Staffordshire	v	Warwickshire

Match Abandoned
Oulton CC, Oulton

- No toss.
- No play possible due to rain.

16 May 2021
11:00
Scorecard

Worcestershire	v	Somerset

Match Abandoned
Halesowen CC, Halesowen

- No toss.
- No play possible due to rain.

16 May 2021
15:00
Scorecard

Berkshire	v	Wales

Match Abandoned
Falkland CC, Newbury

- No toss.
- No play possible due to rain.

16 May 2021
15:00
Scorecard

Staffordshire	v	Warwickshire

Match Abandoned
Oulton CC, Oulton

- No toss.
- No play possible due to rain.

16 May 2021
15:00
Scorecard

Worcestershire	v	Somerset

Match Abandoned
Halesowen CC, Halesowen

- No toss.
- No play possible due to rain.

== Statistics ==
=== Most runs ===
Player	Team	Matches	Innings	Runs	Average	HS	100s	50s
Imogen Sidhu	Suffolk	6	6	293	73.25	63*	0	4
Georgia Hennessy	Somerset	6	6	261	52.20	78	0	2
Emma Lamb	Lancashire	6	4	233	116.50	119*	1	1
Sophie Luff	Somerset	6	5	211	52.75	59	0	2
Chloe Skelton	Gloucestershire	5	5	201	67.00	70*	0	1

Source: CricketArchive

=== Most wickets ===
Player	Team	Overs	Wickets	Average	BBI	5w
Finty Trussler	Hampshire	23.0	16	6.50	4/12	0
Lorraine Szczepanski	Somerset	23.0	13	4.92	4/8	0
Ella Phillips	Hertfordshire	16.2	12	5.00	5/2	1
Bethan Miles	Buckinghamshire	19.0	11	4.45	4/9	0
Bhavika Gajipra	Middlesex	23.0	11	10.63	3/16	0

Source: CricketArchive
