= 2020 Lightning (women's cricket) season =

Lightning
2020 season
- Coach: Rob Taylor
- Captain: Kathryn Bryce
- RHFT: North Group, 4th
- Most runs: Sarah Bryce (395)
- Most wickets: Kathryn Bryce (14)
- Most catches: Kathryn Bryce (4)
- Most wicket-keeping dismissals: Abigail Freeborn (3)

The 2020 season was Lightning's first season, in which they competed in the 50 over Rachael Heyhoe Flint Trophy following reforms to the structure of women's domestic cricket in England. The side finished bottom of the North Group of the competition, winning two of their six matches.

After the ending of the Women's Cricket Super League in 2019, the ECB announced the beginning of a new "women's elite domestic structure". Eight teams were included in this new structure, with Lightning being one of the new teams, replacing Loughborough Lightning and representing the East Midlands. Due to the impact of the COVID-19 pandemic, only the Rachael Heyhoe Flint Trophy was able to take place. Lightning were captained by Kathryn Bryce and coached by Rob Taylor. They played their home matches at Trent Bridge and Grace Road.

== Squad ==
Lightning announced their squad on 20 August 2020. Age given is at the start of Lightning's first match of the season (29 August 2020).

Name	Nationality	Birth date	Batting Style	Bowling Style	Notes
Batters
Ria Fackrell	England	16 September 1999 (aged 20)	Right-handed	Right-arm off break	
Shachi Pai	England	10 October 1998 (aged 21)	Right-handed	Right-arm medium	
All-rounders
Kathryn Bryce	Scotland	17 November 1997 (aged 22)	Right-handed	Right-arm medium	Captain
Bethan Ellis	England	7 July 1999 (aged 21)	Right-handed	Right-arm medium	
Teresa Graves	England	10 October 1998 (aged 21)	Right-handed	Right-arm medium	
Yvonne Graves	England	10 October 1998 (aged 21)	Right-handed	Right-arm off break	
Bethany Harmer	England	30 October 2000 (aged 19)	Right-handed	Right-arm off break	
Wicket-keepers
Tammy Beaumont	England	11 March 1991 (aged 29)	Right-handed	—	
Sarah Bryce	Scotland	8 January 2000 (aged 20)	Right-handed	—	
Abigail Freeborn	England	12 November 1996 (aged 23)	Right-handed	—	
Bowlers
Grace Ballinger	England	3 April 2002 (aged 18)	Left-handed	Left-arm medium	
Kirstie Gordon	England	20 October 1997 (aged 22)	Right-handed	Slow left-arm orthodox	
Nancy Harman	England	11 July 1999 (aged 21)	Right-handed	Right-arm leg break	
Lucy Higham	England	17 October 1997 (aged 22)	Right-handed	Right-arm off break	
Sophie Munro	England	31 August 2001 (aged 18)	Right-handed	Right-arm medium	
Leah Kellogg	England	29 June 1992 (aged 28)	Right-handed	Right-arm medium	
Alicia Presland	England	28 September 1999 (aged 20)	Right-handed	Right-arm medium	
Ilenia Sims	England	10 February 2002 (aged 18)	Right-handed	Right-arm off break	

== Rachael Heyhoe Flint Trophy ==
=== North Group ===
Pos	Team	Pld	W	L	T	NR	BP	Pts	NRR
1	Northern Diamonds	6	5	1	0	0	3	23	1.000
2	Central Sparks	6	3	3	0	0	1	13	−0.285
3	North West Thunder	6	2	4	0	0	1	9	−0.515
4	Lightning	6	2	4	0	0	0	8	−0.113

Source: ESPN Cricinfo

=== Fixtures ===
29 August 2020
10:30 BST
Scorecard

North West Thunder; 206/9 (50 overs)	v	Lightning; 146 (35.5 overs)
Sophie Ecclestone 60* (61); Sophie Munro 3/32 (9 overs)		Sarah Bryce 52 (69); Sophie Ecclestone 2/29 (7.5 overs)

North West Thunder won by 4 runs (DLS)
Trent Bridge, Nottingham
Umpires: Joanne Ibbotson and Ian Ramage

- North West Thunder won the toss and elected to bat.
- Lightning were set a revised target of 151 runs from 36 overs due to rain.
- Points: North West Thunder 4, Lightning 0

31 August 2020
10:30 BST
Scorecard

Northern Diamonds; 226/9 (50 overs)	v	Lightning; 217/7 (50 overs)
Nat Sciver 104 (116); Kathryn Bryce 5/29 (10 overs)		Kathryn Bryce 71* (81); Nat Sciver 2/30 (10 overs)

Northern Diamonds won by 9 runs
Riverside Ground, Chester-le-Street
Umpires: Neil Pratt and Lina Nenova

- Northern Diamonds won the toss and elected to bat.
- Points: Northern Diamonds 4, Lightning 0

5 September 2020
10:30 BST
Scorecard

Lightning; 226 (49.1 overs)	v	Northern Diamonds; 229/8 (48.5 overs)
Sarah Bryce 51 (69); Alex MacDonald 2/31 (10 overs)		Jenny Gunn 50* (72); Lucy Higham 3/38 (10 overs)

Northern Diamonds won by 2 wickets
Grace Road, Leicester
Umpires: Joanne Ibbotson and Sue Redfern

- Northern Diamonds won the toss and elected to field.
- Points: Northern Diamonds 4, Lightning 0

11 September 2020
10:30 BST
Scorecard

Lightning; 233/8 (50 overs)	v	Central Sparks; 227/9 (50 overs)
Sarah Bryce 75 (98); Anisha Patel 3/49 (10 overs)		Marie Kelly 53 (82); Alicia Presland 3/26 (10 overs)

Lightning won by 6 runs
New Road, Worcester
Umpires: Hassan Adnan and Yvette Dolphin-Cooper

- Central Sparks won the toss and elected to field.
- Points: Lightning 4, Central Sparks 0

13 September 2020
10:30 BST
Scorecard

North West Thunder; 188/9 (50 overs)	v	Lightning; 116 (39.1 overs)
Natalie Brown 52 (82); Kathryn Bryce 4/38 (10 overs)		Abigail Freeborn 28 (67); Alex Hartley 4/8 (10 overs)

North West Thunder won by 72 runs
Aigburth Cricket Ground, Liverpool
Umpires: Jasmine Naeem and Tom Lungley

- North West Thunder won the toss and elected to bat.
- Points: North West Thunder 5, Lightning 0

19 September 2020
10:30 BST
Scorecard

Lightning; 303/5 (50 overs)	v	Central Sparks; 248 (49.4 overs)
Sarah Bryce 136* (133); Anisha Patel 2/46 (10 overs)		Evelyn Jones 115* (138); Kathryn Bryce 3/54 (9.4 overs)

Lightning won by 55 runs
Grace Road, Leicester
Umpires: Paul Pollard and Malinda Underdown

- Central Sparks won the toss and elected to field.
- Points: Lightning 4, Central Sparks 0

== Statistics ==
=== Batting ===
Player	Matches	Innings	NO	Runs	HS	Average	Strike rate	100s	50s	4s	6s
Grace Ballinger	3	2	1	5	5	5.00	38.46	0	0	0	0
Tammy Beaumont	2	2	0	53	51	26.50	63.09	0	1	5	0
Kathryn Bryce	6	6	1	141	71*	28.20	65.27	0	1	13	1
Sarah Bryce	6	6	1	395	136*	79.00	78.52	1	4	48	0
Bethan Ellis	6	6	0	120	62	20.00	59.11	0	1	11	0
Ria Fackrell	1	1	0	8	8	8.00	34.78	0	0	0	0
Abigail Freeborn	5	5	0	167	40	33.40	69.29	0	0	20	1
Kirstie Gordon	3	2	1	2	2*	2.00	40.00	0	0	0	0
Teresa Graves	6	6	0	114	65	19.00	89.06	0	1	14	1
Nancy Harman	6	6	1	43	21	8.60	78.18	0	0	4	0
Lucy Higham	6	6	0	42	19	7.00	50.60	0	0	4	0
Leah Kellogg	2	2	1	1	1*	1.00	10.00	0	0	0	0
Sophie Munro	5	2	0	5	3	2.50	35.71	0	0	0	0
Shachi Pai	4	3	0	23	9	7.66	50.00	0	0	1	0
Alicia Presland	4	2	1	9	5	9.00	39.13	0	0	1	0
Ilenia Sims	1	1	1	1	1*	–	14.28	0	0	0	0
Source: ESPN Cricinfo

=== Bowling ===
Player	Matches	Innings	Overs	Maidens	Runs	Wickets	BBI	Average	Economy	Strike rate
Grace Ballinger	3	2	11.0	1	60	0	–	–	5.45	–
Kathryn Bryce	6	6	55.4	4	216	14	5/29	15.42	3.88	23.8
Bethan Ellis	6	6	47.5	1	210	6	3/25	35.00	4.39	47.8
Kirstie Gordon	3	3	29.0	1	101	3	2/40	33.66	3.48	58.0
Teresa Graves	6	4	17.0	0	75	3	2/17	25.00	4.41	34.0
Nancy Harman	6	4	20.0	0	112	2	2/54	56.00	5.60	60.0
Lucy Higham	6	6	44.0	3	195	8	3/38	24.37	4.43	33.0
Leah Kellogg	2	2	10.0	0	45	2	1/14	22.50	4.50	30.0
Sophie Munro	5	5	37.0	2	163	4	3/32	40.75	4.40	55.5
Alicia Presland	4	4	27.0	0	114	5	3/26	22.80	4.22	32.4
Source: ESPN Cricinfo

=== Fielding ===
Player	Matches	Innings	Catches
Grace Ballinger	3	3	2
Tammy Beaumont	2	2	3
Kathryn Bryce	6	6	4
Sarah Bryce	6	3	1
Bethan Ellis	6	6	3
Ria Fackrell	1	1	0
Abigail Freeborn	5	2	0
Kirstie Gordon	3	3	0
Teresa Graves	6	6	2
Nancy Harman	6	6	1
Lucy Higham	6	6	0
Leah Kellogg	2	2	0
Sophie Munro	5	5	0
Shachi Pai	4	4	1
Alicia Presland	4	4	0
Ilenia Sims	1	1	0
Source: ESPN Cricinfo

=== Wicket-keeping ===
Player	Matches	Innings	Catches	Stumpings
Sarah Bryce	6	3	0	1
Abigail Freeborn	5	3	1	2
Source: ESPN Cricinfo
