= King Edmund =

King Edmund may refer to:

== Monarchs ==
- Edmund the Martyr (fl. 855–869), king of East Anglia later canonised as Saint Edmund
- Edmund I of England (921–946)
- Edmund II of England (fl. 1000–1016), also known as Edmund Ironside
- Edmund of Scotland (fl. 1070–1097), included in some lists of Kings of Scots

== Characters ==
- Prince Edmund (Blackadder), character in The Black Adder who was King Edmund III of England
- Edmund Pevensie, from The Chronicles of Narnia

== See also ==
- King Edmund School, Rochford, Essex, England
- Prince Edmund (disambiguation)
