= Hannah Baker (cricketer) =

English cricketer (born 2004)

Personal information
- Full name: Hannah Louise Baker
- Born: 3 February 2004 (age 22); Dudley, Staffordshire, England
- Batting: Right-handed
- Bowling: Right-arm leg break
- Role: Bowler

International information
- National side: England
- ODI debut (cap 147): 7 September 2024 v Ireland
- Last ODI: 11 September 2024 v Ireland

Domestic team information
- Years: Team
- 2018–2019: Worcestershire
- 2020–present: Warwickshire
- 2020–2024: Central Sparks
- 2021–2022: Welsh Fire
- 2023–2025: Birmingham Phoenix
- 2026–present: Sunrisers Leeds

Career statistics
Competition	WODI	WLA	WT20
Matches	2	37	65
Runs scored	3	64	29
Batting average	–	5.81	3.22
100s/50s	0/0	0/0	0/0
Top score	3*	64	6*
Balls bowled	78	1,577	1,063
Wickets	1	37	56
Bowling average	77.00	35.08	22.60
5 wickets in innings	0	1	0
10 wickets in match	0	0	0
Best bowling	1/53	5/45	4/14
Catches/stumpings	0/–	6/–	12/–
- Source: CricketArchive, 16 October 2024

Hannah Louise Baker (born 3 February 2004) is an English cricketer who currently plays for Warwickshire and Sunrisers Leeds. She plays as a right-arm leg break bowler. Hannah’s team as she was growing up was Beacon CC and became the first ever women from Beacon to ever play for England. She previously played for Worcestershire, Central Sparks, Welsh Fire and Birmingham Phoenix.

== Domestic career ==
Baker made her county debut in 2018, for Worcestershire against Warwickshire. This was the only game she played for the side that season; in 2019 she appeared in 9 matches, but only took 1 wicket.

Baker moved to Warwickshire in 2020, and made her debut for them in the 2021 Women's Twenty20 Cup. She took 4/14 in her first match, helping her side to victory over Wales. Overall, she was Warwickshire's leading wicket-taker in the tournament, with 8 wickets at an average of 6.75. She took seven wickets at an average of 16.50 for the side in the 2022 Women's Twenty20 Cup. In Warwickshire's two 2023 Women's Twenty20 Cup matches, she took five wickets at an average of 6.20.

In 2020, Baker played for Central Sparks in the Rachael Heyhoe Flint Trophy. She appeared in 2 matches, taking 4 wickets at an average of 18.75. Her best performance came against Northern Diamonds, where she took 3/26 from 10 overs. In 2021, she played three matches for the side in the Charlotte Edwards Cup, taking one wicket. Baker also signed for Welsh Fire in The Hundred as a temporary replacement for Bethan Ellis. She played four matches for the side, taking 2 wickets at an average of 26.50. She played thirteen matches for Central Sparks in 2022, across the Charlotte Edwards Cup and the Rachael Heyhoe Flint Trophy, taking twelve wickets. She also played four matches for Welsh Fire in The Hundred.

In January 2023, it was announced that Baker had signed her first professional contract with Central Sparks. That season, she took 10 wickets at an average of 27.10 for Central Sparks in the Rachael Heyhoe Flint Trophy. She also moved to Birmingham Phoenix in The Hundred, taking six wickets at an average of 20.16 in her six matches. In 2024, she played 22 matches for Central Sparks, across the Rachael Heyhoe Flint Trophy and the Charlotte Edwards Cup, and was the side's joint-leading wicket-taker in the Rachael Heyhoe Flint Trophy, with 15 wickets at an average of 28.33.

== International career ==
In October 2022, Baker was selected in the England Under-19 squad for the 2023 ICC Under-19 Women's T20 World Cup. She went on to be the joint-third highest wicket-taker in the tournament, with 10 wickets at an average of 7.30. She was named Player of the Match in England's semi-final victory over Australia, taking 3/10 from her four overs. She was subsequently named in the ICC's Team of the Tournament.

Baker made her One Day International debut for England against Ireland at Stormont in Belfast on 7 September 2024 taking 1/53 from her 10 overs.
