= Prince Edmund =

Prince Edmund may refer to:

- Edmund of Langley, 1st Duke of York (1341–1402), the fifth son of Edward III of England
- Edmund Tudor, Duke of Somerset, son of Henry VII of England and Elizabeth of York
- Prince Edmund Batthyany-Strattmann (1826–1914), a Hungarian nobleman

in fiction

- Prince Edmund (Blackadder) (1461- 1498), the name of the main character in the first series of the British sitcom Blackadder

== See also ==
- King Edmund (disambiguation)
