= Bethan Miles =

English cricketer

Personal information
- Full name: Bethan Jane Miles
- Born: 25 November 2003 (age 22); Watford, Hertfordshire, England
- Batting: Right-handed
- Bowling: Slow left-arm orthodox
- Role: Bowler

Domestic team information
- Years: Team
- 2018–2022: Buckinghamshire
- 2021–present: Surrey
- 2022–2024: South East Stars

Career statistics
Competition	WLA	WT20
Matches	19	34
Runs scored	110	277
Batting average	10.00	16.29
100s/50s	0/0	0/1
Top score	33	53*
Balls bowled	588	690
Wickets	16	36
Bowling average	25.25	15.02
5 wickets in innings	0	0
10 wickets in match	0	0
Best bowling	3/15	4/9
Catches/stumpings	3/–	9/–
- Source: CricketArchive, 18 October 2024

Bethan Jane Miles (born 25 November 2003) is an English cricketer who currently plays for Surrey. She plays primarily as a slow left-arm orthodox bowler. She has previously played for Buckinghamshire.

== Domestic career ==
Miles made her county debut in 2018, for Buckinghamshire against Oxfordshire in the Women's County Championship, taking 2/24 from her 10 overs. She went on to be her side's leading wicket-taker in the Women's Twenty20 Cup that season, with six wickets at an average of 27.16. The following season, she took eight wickets at an average of 14.12 in the Women's Twenty20 Cup. In 2020, she took eight wickets for the side in the East of England Women's County Championship. In the 2021 Women's Twenty20 Cup, Miles was the joint-fourth leading wicket-taker across the whole competition, with 11 wickets at an average of 4.45, as well as scoring her maiden county half-century, scoring 53* against Cambridgeshire. Later that season, she became dual-registered with Surrey, appearing for the side in the Women's London Championship. She appeared for both Buckinghamshire and Surrey in the 2022 Women's Twenty20 Cup, taking five wickets across the competition.

Miles was named in the South East Stars Academy squad for the 2021 season. She was again named in the academy squad for the 2022 season, but was added to the first team squad in July 2022. She made her debut for the side on 16 July 2022, against North West Thunder in the Rachael Heyhoe Flint Trophy, and took her List A best bowling figures, of 3/15 from her 6 overs. She played seven matches for the side in 2023, all in the Rachael Heyhoe Flint Trophy, taking three wickets. In 2024, she played six matches for South East Stars, all in the Rachael Heyhoe Flint Trophy, taking five wickets at an average of 38.80.

== International career ==
In October 2022, Miles was selected as a non-travelling reserve in the England Under-19 squad for the 2023 ICC Under-19 Women's T20 World Cup.

== Eton Fives ==
Miles is also an accomplished Eton Fives player, winning multiple national age group titles while at school. In 2025 she partnered fellow cricketer Issy Wong to become National U25 champions.
