= Teresa Graves (cricketer) =

English cricketer

Personal information
- Full name: Teresa Monika Graves
- Born: 10 October 1998 (age 28); Halifax, West Yorkshire, England
- Batting: Right-handed
- Bowling: Right-arm medium
- Role: All-rounder
- Relatives: Yvonne Graves (twin sister)

Domestic team information
- Years: Team
- 2014–2018: Yorkshire
- 2016–2017: Yorkshire Diamonds
- 2018–present: Nottinghamshire
- 2020–2024: The Blaze
- 2021: Trent Rockets

Career statistics
Competition	WLA	WT20
Matches	57	64
Runs scored	684	594
Batting average	13.68	10.80
100s/50s	0/2	0/0
Top score	65	45
Balls bowled	1,166	549
Wickets	31	20
Bowling average	25.67	27.60
5 wickets in innings	0	0
10 wickets in match	0	0
Best bowling	4/39	2/12
Catches/stumpings	10/–	10/–
- Source: CricketArchive, 19 October 2024

Teresa Monika Graves (born 10 October 1998) is an English cricketer who currently plays for Nottinghamshire. An all-rounder, she is a right-handed batter and right-arm medium bowler. She previously played for Yorkshire, Yorkshire Diamonds, The Blaze and Trent Rockets.

== Early life ==
Graves was born on 10 October 1998 in Halifax, West Yorkshire. Her twin sister, Yvonne, also plays for Nottinghamshire.

== Domestic career ==
Graves made her county debut in 2014, for Yorkshire against Berkshire. Graves became more of a regular for the side from 2016, and in 2017 she took 7 wickets in the County Championship, including her List A best bowling of 3/25 against Sussex.

In 2018, Graves moved to Nottinghamshire. She hit 116 runs for them that season in the Twenty20 Cup, including her Twenty20 high score of 45, as well as taking 4 wickets. In 2021, she scored 88 runs for the side as they won the East Midlands Group of the Twenty20 Cup. She was Nottinghamshire's second-highest run-scorer and joint-leading wicket-taker in the 2022 Women's Twenty20 Cup, with 114 runs and six wickets.

Graves was in the Yorkshire Diamonds squad in the Women's Cricket Super League in 2016 and 2017, but did not play a match for the side.

In 2020, Graves played for Lightning in the Rachael Heyhoe Flint Trophy. She appeared in all six matches, scoring 114 runs at an average of 19.00 and taking 3 wickets at an average of 25.00. She hit her List A high score of 65 in Lightning's final match of the tournament, a victory over Central Sparks. In 2021, Graves scored 103 runs and took 9 wickets for the side in the Rachael Heyhoe Flint Trophy, including her List A best bowling figures of 4/39, taken against Sunrisers. She was also ever-present for the side throughout the Charlotte Edwards Cup, and played two matches for the Trent Rockets in The Hundred. She played nine matches for Lightning in 2022, across the Charlotte Edwards Cup and the Rachael Heyhoe Flint Trophy, scoring 51 runs and taking three wickets. In February 2023, it was announced that Graves had signed her first professional contract with Lightning, now known as The Blaze. She played seven matches for the side in 2023, all in the Rachael Heyhoe Flint Trophy, scoring 118 runs including one half-century.

In 2024, she played 17 matches for The Blaze, across the Rachael Heyhoe Flint Trophy and the Charlotte Edwards Cup, taking two wickets with a high score of 33. Graves left The Blaze when her contract expired in October 2024.
