= Kelly Castle =

English cricketer (born 1997)

Personal information
- Full name: Kelly Shannon Castle
- Born: 4 September 1997 (age 29); Southend-on-Sea, Essex, England
- Batting: Right-handed
- Bowling: Right-arm medium
- Role: All-rounder

Domestic team information
- Years: Team
- 2011–present: Essex
- 2020–2024: Sunrisers

Career statistics
Competition	WLA	WT20
Matches	72	84
Runs scored	652	894
Batting average	11.64	15.68
100s/50s	0/1	0/2
Top score	52	75
Balls bowled	1,882	1,205
Wickets	48	57
Bowling average	26.70	19.42
5 wickets in innings	1	0
10 wickets in match	0	0
Best bowling	5/18	3/6
Catches/stumpings	16/–	25/–
- Source: CricketArchive, 19 October 2024

Kelly Shannon Castle (born 4 September 1997) is an English cricketer who currently plays for Essex. She plays as an all-rounder, bowling right-arm medium and batting right-handed.

== Early life ==
Castle was born on 4 September 1997 in Southend-on-Sea, Essex. She attended King Edmund School in Rochford and Anglia Ruskin University.

== Domestic career ==
Castle made her county debut in 2011, for Essex against Middlesex. She scored a duck and did not bowl. This was the only game she played in 2011, and played one more in 2012 before becoming more of a regular in the side from 2013 onwards. In 2015 she took her maiden county five-wicket haul, 5/18 against Scotland, and overall took 10 wickets at 14.80 in the County Championship. She was also her side's leading wicket-taker in the 2015 Women's Twenty20 Cup, taking 13 wickets at an average of 8.61. In 2017, Castle hit her List A high score of 47, opening the batting in a victory over the Netherlands. She was named as Essex's Twenty20 captain in 2018, and became captain in both formats in 2019. In the 2019 Women's Twenty20 Cup, Castle was her side's leading wicket-taker, with 7 wickets at an average of 12.42, and hit her Twenty20 high score of 48, in a win against Devon. She played six matches in the 2021 Women's Twenty20 Cup, scoring 42 runs and taking three wickets. In the 2022 Women's Twenty20 Cup, she scored her first two half-centuries, including 75 against Suffolk, scoring 167 runs overall as well as taking four wickets.

In 2020, Castle played for Sunrisers in the Rachael Heyhoe Flint Trophy. She appeared in all 6 matches, scoring 85 runs at an average of 17.00 and taking one wicket. In December 2020, it was announced that Castle was one of the 41 female cricketers that had signed a full-time domestic contract. Castle was ever-present for the side in the 2021 season, and was the side's leading wicket-taker in the Rachael Heyhoe Flint Trophy, with 10 wickets at an average of 21.10. She also scored her maiden List A half-century in the tournament, 52 against Lightning. She also captained the side in the Charlotte Edwards Cup.

Ahead of the 2022 season, Castle became the Sunrisers captain in all formats. She played eleven matches for the side that season, across the Charlotte Edwards Cup and the Rachael Heyhoe Flint Trophy, and was the side's joint-leading wicket-taker in the Charlotte Edwards Cup, with 7 wickets at an average of 16.85. In 2023, she played 18 matches for Sunrisers, across the Rachael Heyhoe Flint Trophy and the Charlotte Edwards Cup, taking 15 wickets. She stepped down as captain of the side in June 2023.

In October 2024, she signed a professional contract for Essex Women ahead of the 2025 women's domestic cricket restructure.

Castle was part of the England Development Programme at Under-15 level.
