= Clare Boycott =

English cricketer (born 1993)

Personal information
- Full name: Clare Katherine Boycott
- Born: 31 December 1993 (age 32); Redditch, Worcestershire, England
- Height: 5 ft 2 in (1.57 m)
- Batting: Right-handed
- Bowling: Right-arm medium
- Role: All-rounder

Domestic team information
- Years: Team
- 2008–present: Worcestershire
- 2020–2022: Central Sparks

Career statistics
Competition	WLA	WT20
Matches	109	94
Runs scored	2,127	1,389
Batting average	25.62	26.20
100s/50s	2/11	0/4
Top score	112	90*
Balls bowled	3,363	1,495
Wickets	85	71
Bowling average	25.42	18.78
5 wickets in innings	1	0
10 wickets in match	0	0
Best bowling	6/16	4/9
Catches/stumpings	21/-	14/–
- Source: CricketArchive, 20 October 2026

Clare Katherine Boycott (born 31 December 1993) is an English cricketer who currently plays for Worcestershire. An all-rounder, she plays as a right-arm medium bowler and right-handed batter. She has previously played for Central Sparks.

== Early life ==
Boycott was born on 31 December 1993 in Redditch, Worcestershire.

== Domestic career ==
Boycott made her county debut in 2008, for Worcestershire against Essex. In the 2009 Women's County Championship, she took 7 wickets at an average of 17.85. In 2011, Boycott scored her first county half-century, hitting 59* against Staffordshire, as well as taking 11 wickets in the County Championship.

In 2015, Boycott was Worcestershire's leading run-scorer in the County Championship, with 236 runs at an average of 39.33, including one half-century. In 2016, she hit another half-century, 59 against Leicestershire, and was her side's joint-leading wicket-taker in the Twenty20 Cup, with 8 wickets at an average of 11.75. The following season, Boycott hit her List A high score, 63* against Staffordshire, and was Worcestershire's leading wicket-taker in both formats, with 7 wickets in the Championship and 14 in the Twenty20 Cup, the highest across the whole competition.

In 2018, Boycott achieved her List A best bowling figures, taking 6/16 against Shropshire, as well as hitting two half-centuries in the County Championship. The following season, Boycott hit 61* in a County Championship match against Somerset, and took 14 wickets across the two formats. In 2021, she made what was at the time her Twenty20 high score, scoring 40 in a match for Worcestershire against Warwickshire. In the 2022 Women's Twenty20 Cup, she scored her maiden Twenty20 half-century, scoring 65 against Berkshire, as well as taking nine wickets in eight matches. During the 2022 season, Boycott reached the milestone of playing 200 matches for Worcestershire, across age-group and senior cricket.

In 2020, Boycott played for Central Sparks in the Rachael Heyhoe Flint Trophy. She appeared in five matches, scoring 53 runs and taking 8 wickets at an average of 20.00, the joint-most for the side. Her best performance with the ball came in the Sparks' victory over North West Thunder, taking 4/40 from 10 overs. She appeared in nine matches for the side in 2021, and took 4 wickets at an average of 20.25 in the Charlotte Edwards Cup. She appeared in one match for the side in 2022, in the Rachael Heyhoe Flint Trophy. Ahead of the 2023 season, it was confirmed that Boycott had left Central Sparks.

Boycott was appointed captain of the Worcestershire Women's team in 2025.
