= Yvonne Graves =

English cricketer (born 1998)

Personal information
- Full name: Yvonne Graves
- Born: 10 October 1998 (age 28); Halifax, West Yorkshire, England
- Batting: Right-handed
- Bowling: Right-arm off break
- Role: All-rounder
- Relatives: Teresa Graves (twin sister)

Domestic team information
- Years: Team
- 2014–2016: Yorkshire
- 2017–present: Nottinghamshire
- 2020–2021: Lightning
- 2022–2023: Northern Diamonds

Career statistics
Competition	WLA	WT20
Matches	28	40
Runs scored	275	294
Batting average	11.45	12.78
100s/50s	0/1	0/0
Top score	57	42
Balls bowled	252	268
Wickets	6	12
Bowling average	33.66	20.16
5 wickets in innings	0	0
10 wickets in match	0	0
Best bowling	3/43	3/11
Catches/stumpings	0/–	15/–
- Source: CricketArchive, 4 October 2023

Yvonne Graves (born 10 October 1998) is an English cricketer who currently plays for Nottinghamshire. An all-rounder, she is a right-handed batter and right-arm off break bowler. She previously played for Yorkshire, Lightning and Northern Diamonds.

== Early life ==
Graves was born on 10 October 1998 in Halifax, West Yorkshire. Her twin sister, Teresa, also plays for Nottinghamshire.

== Domestic career ==
Graves made her county debut in 2014, for Yorkshire against Surrey. She only played one more county match for Yorkshire, in 2015, again against Surrey.

Ahead of the 2017 season, Graves joined Nottinghamshire. That season, in a match against former side Yorkshire, Graves made 40 before being bowled by her twin sister Teresa. In 2018, she made her maiden List A half-century, scoring 57 against Somerset in a 112 run victory. In 2021, Graves helped her side to winning the East Midlands Group of the Twenty20 Cup, and achieved her T20 high score of 42, in a victory over Derbyshire. On the same day, against the same opposition, she also took her T20 best bowling figures, of 3/11. In the 2022 Women's Twenty20 Cup, she scored 76 runs and took five wickets in seven matches. She played one match for the side in the 2023 Women's Twenty20 Cup.

Partway through the 2020 Rachael Heyhoe Flint Trophy, Graves was called up to the Lightning squad, but did not play a match that season. The following season she was selected as part of the full squad, and made her debut for the side on 29 May, against Southern Vipers in the Rachael Heyhoe Flint Trophy. She went on to take six wickets in the tournament, including her List A best bowling figures of 3/43, taken against South East Stars. She also appeared in three matches in the Charlotte Edwards Cup, taking two wickets.

Ahead of the 2022 season, Graves signed for Northern Diamonds. She played three matches for her new side that season, across the Charlotte Edwards Cup and the Rachael Heyhoe Flint Trophy. She was included in the Northern Diamonds squad in 2023, but did not play a match. At the end of the season, Graves left the club.
