= Ami Campbell =

English cricketer

Personal information
- Full name: Ami Campbell
- Born: 6 June 1991 (age 35); Newcastle upon Tyne, England
- Batting: Left-handed
- Bowling: Right-arm medium
- Role: Batter

Domestic team information
- Years: Team
- 2005–2010: Northumberland
- 2013–2014: Yorkshire
- 2016–2017: Northumberland
- 2018–2019: Durham
- 2020–2024: North East Warriors
- 2022–2023: → Worcestershire (on loan)
- 2020–2021: Northern Diamonds
- 2021: Northern Superchargers
- 2022–2024: Central Sparks
- 2022–2023: Manchester Originals

Career statistics
Competition	WLA	WT20
Matches	77	70
Runs scored	1,564	1,077
Batting average	22.66	17.95
100s/50s	1/8	0/5
Top score	135	81
Balls bowled	344	72
Wickets	11	1
Bowling average	18.00	66.00
5 wickets in innings	1	0
10 wickets in match	0	0
Best bowling	5/31	1/22
Catches/stumpings	35/–	19/–
- Source: CricketArchive, 16 October 2024

Ami Campbell (born 6 June 1991) is an English cricketer who most recently played for Worcestershire, on loan from North East Warriors, Central Sparks and Manchester Originals. She plays as a left-handed batter. She has previously played for Northumberland, Yorkshire, Durham, Northern Diamonds and Northern Superchargers.

== Early life ==
Campbell was born on 6 June 1991 in Newcastle upon Tyne.

== Domestic career ==
Campbell made her county debut in 2005, in a County Challenge Cup match for Northumberland against Durham. Northumberland joined the full County Championship in 2008, and a season later Campbell was their top run-scorer in the tournament, as well as hitting her maiden county half-century, 68* against Ireland. In 2010, Campbell was again Northumberland's Championship leading run-scorer, with 193 runs at an average of 38.40. She also took her maiden five-wicket haul in 2010, with 5/31 against Shropshire.

Campbell then took a break from county cricket for two years, returning in 2013 to play for Yorkshire. After two seasons with Yorkshire, making little impact and another season's break, Campbell returned to Northumberland. Campbell soon returned to form, and was Northumberland's leading run-scorer in both the 2016 Women's County Championship and 2016 Women's Twenty20 Cup, and hit her career high score in both formats, 135 in List A matches and 81 in Twenty20s.

Campbell moved to Durham ahead of the 2018 season, with her best season for the side coming that year, when she hit 147 runs at an average of 36.75 in the 2018 Women's County Championship. In 2020, Durham merged with Northumberland to form the North East Warriors. Although the side did not play any competitive matches that year due to the COVID-19 pandemic, Campbell appeared in two friendlies against Scotland for the team in 2020. In 2021, she was the side's highest run-scorer in the Twenty20 Cup, scoring 177 runs, including two half-centuries. On 31 December 2021, it was announced that Campbell had signed for Worcestershire on loan for the 2022 county season. She played five matches for the side in the 2022 Women's Twenty20 Cup, scoring 95 runs at an average of 23.75. She continued to play for Worcestershire in the 2023 Women's Twenty20 Cup.

In 2020, Campbell played for Northern Diamonds in the Rachael Heyhoe Flint Trophy. She appeared in five matches, including the final, scoring 70 runs with a high score of 43, made against Lightning. In 2021, Campbell helped her side reach the final of both the Rachael Heyhoe Flint Trophy and the Charlotte Edwards Cup. She scored 223 runs in the Rachael Heyhoe Flint Trophy, and top-scored for the side in both the play-off and the final, with 76 against Central Sparks and 60 against Southern Vipers. She was also in the Northern Superchargers squad for The Hundred, but did not play a match. At the end of the season it was announced that Campbell had moved to Central Sparks, and signed a professional contract with her new side. She also signed for Manchester Originals for the 2022 season of The Hundred. She was ever-present for Central Sparks in 2022, with a top score of 50 in the Rachael Heyhoe Flint Trophy against Western Storm. She also played every match for Manchester Originals, scoring 52 runs.

In 2023, she played 20 matches for Central Sparks, across the Rachael Heyhoe Flint Trophy and the Charlotte Edwards Cup, scoring 237 runs in the Rachael Heyhoe Flint Trophy including two half-centuries. She also played four matches for Manchester Originals in The Hundred, scoring 45 runs. In 2024, she played 14 matches for Central Sparks, across the Rachael Heyhoe Flint Trophy and the Charlotte Edwards Cup.
