= St George's Road Cricket Ground, Harrogate =

Sports venue in North Yorkshire, England

Coordinates: 53°58′44″N 1°32′23″W

St George's Road
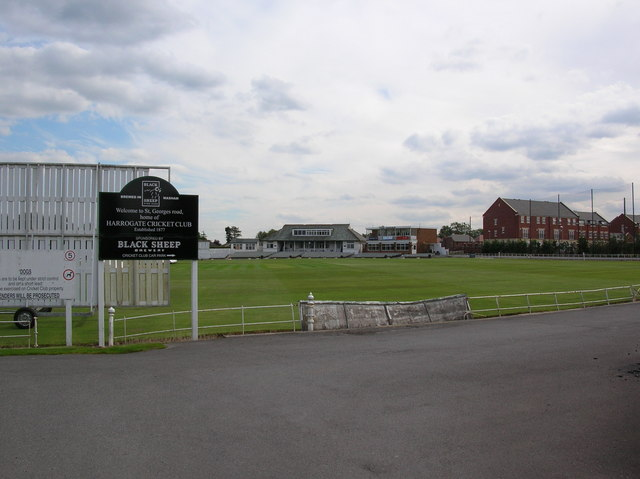
- Interactive map of St George's Road

Ground information
- Location: Harrogate, North Yorkshire
- Country: England
- Establishment: 1880 (first recorded match)
- Capacity: 8,000
- End names
- St Georges Road End; Pavilion End

International information
- Only women's Test: 11–15 August 1998: England v Australia

Team information
England XI	(1882, 1885, 1886 & 1888)
Yorkshire	(1894-1996)
Players	(1902)
North	(1947)
Yorkshire Cricket Board	(2000)
- As of 5 September 2020; Source: Ground profile

St George's Road Cricket Ground in Harrogate, North Yorkshire, England, that hosted 98 first class matches between 1882 and 2000.

It hosted a woman's Test match starting on 1 August 1998 between England women and Australia women. It had a capacity at its peak of 8,000 spectators. The two bowling ends are known as the St Georges Road End and the Pavilion End.

Yorkshire twice posted scores of 500 on the ground, 548 for 4 declared against Northamptonshire in 1921 and 513 for 7 declared against the Combined Services in 1954. In contrast Worcestershire were bowled out for 42 by Yorkshire in 1923, while the home side were dismissed for just 50 by the touring West Indians in 1906. Yorkshire were dismissed for only 76 by Surrey in a List-A match in 1970.

Two double centuries were scored at the ground, 277* by Percy Holmes against Northamptonshire in 1921, as part of that 548, and 217* by Viv Richards for Somerset in 1975. Mark Robinson of Yorkshire took a remarkable 9 for 37 against Northamptonshire in 1993 while George Macaulay (8 for 21 v The Indians in 1932), Wilfred Rhodes (8 for 28 v Essex in 1900) and Schofield Haigh (8-35 v Hampshire in 1896) recorded 8 wicket hauls. Ray Illingworth took a remarkable 7 for 6 in the second innings against Gloucestershire in 1967. He had recorded figures of 7 for 58 in the first innings, giving him 14 for 65 in the match.

Yorkshire played their final county game there in 1996, when they beat Hampshire by ten wickets.

The County Championship match between Yorkshire and Kent in 1904 was declared void after several holes in the pitch were repaired after the first day's play by outsiders. The teams continued to play for the rest of the second day to entertain the crowd.
