= Leah Kellogg =

English cricketer and footballer

Personal information
- Full name: Leah Grace Kellogg
- Born: 29 June 1992 (age 34); Derby, England
- Batting: Left-handed
- Bowling: Right-arm medium
- Role: Bowler
- Relatives: Donna Kellogg (sister)

Domestic team information
- Years: Team
- 2009–2019: Derbyshire
- 2020–2021: Lightning

Career statistics
Competition	WLA	WT20
Matches	70	47
Runs scored	948	572
Batting average	20.17	17.33
100s/50s	0/4	0/3
Top score	82	70*
Balls bowled	2,942	878
Wickets	84	38
Bowling average	20.44	19.65
5 wickets in innings	0	0
10 wickets in match	0	0
Best bowling	4/24	3/15
Catches/stumpings	15/–	18/–
- Source: CricketArchive, 29 March 2021

Leah Grace Kellogg (born 29 June 1992) is an English cricketer and footballer. In cricket, she has played for Derbyshire and Lightning. She plays as a right-arm medium bowler. In football, she plays as a goalkeeper, and plays for Sheffield FC Women, having previously played for Derby County.

== Early and personal life ==
Kellogg was born on 29 June 1992 in Derby. The youngest child of Neil and Sharon Kellogg, she grew up in the Spondon area of the city. From a sporting family, her sister Donna Kellogg has represented Great Britain in badminton at three Olympic Games, while her father and brothers were active in local football and cricket. Her brothers Sam and Joe both played for Spondon Cricket Club. In 2011, Joe died aged 26 due to an undetected heart condition while training with his football team Borrowash Victoria, after which the family raised money to fund defibrillators.

After working as a teaching assistant apprentice at The Bemrose School in Derby, Kellogg trained to become a teacher at the University of Derby before returning to Bemrose to teach physical education. She set up a girls' cricket team at the school and won the Women in Sport prize at the Derby Telegraph Sports Awards.

== Cricket career ==
Kellogg made her county debut in 2009, for Derbyshire against Hampshire, taking 3/34 from 8 overs. She hit her maiden county half-century a season later, scoring 56 against Durham, as well as taking 13 wickets at an average of 16.84 in the County Championship. In 2013, Kellogg took 12 wickets in the County Championship, including her List A best bowling of 4/24, and hit her List A high score of 82, against Oxfordshire. In the Twenty20 Cup the same year, she was Derbyshire's leading wicket-taker, with 7 wickets at an average of 7.42. The following season, she took 11 wickets at an average of 18.90 in the County Championship, and achieved her Twenty20 high score, hitting 70* in a victory over Scotland.

In 2016, Kellogg helped her side to promotion from Division 3 in both formats. In 2018, she became captain of Derbyshire in the Twenty20 Cup, and from 2019 she was captain in both formats, with her side finishing 2nd in Division 3A in the 2019 Women's County Championship.

In 2020, Kellogg played for Lightning in the Rachael Heyhoe Flint Trophy. She appeared in two matches, taking 2 wickets at an average of 22.50.

== Football career ==
Kellogg only took up football while at university, around the age of 20, and was initially an outfield player. Her manager at the university team was also manager of Long Eaton United; after being invited to train at Long Eaton, she began to play in goal. She signed for Derby County in the FA Women's National League North at the start of the 2018–19 season. In 2020, she rejoined Long Eaton United. She now plays for Sheffield FC in the FA Women’s National League North this being her 4th season with the club holding the number 1 shirt.
