= Sonia Odedra =

English cricketer

Personal information
- Full name: Sonia Balu Odedra
- Born: 3 June 1988 (age 38); Isleworth, Greater London, England
- Batting: Right-handed
- Bowling: Right-arm medium-fast
- Role: All-rounder

International information
- National side: England (2014)
- Only Test (cap 154): 13 August 2014 v India

Domestic team information
- Years: Team
- 2008: Leicestershire
- 2009–2021: Nottinghamshire
- 2016–2018: Loughborough Lightning
- 2019: Western Storm
- 2021: Lightning
- 2021: Southern Brave

Career statistics
Competition	WTest	WLA	WT20
Matches	1	97	98
Runs scored	2	1,804	1,115
Batting average	1.00	24.37	15.27
100s/50s	0/0	1/11	0/3
Top score	1	112	73
Balls bowled	162	4,562	1,798
Wickets	1	121	72
Bowling average	50.00	21.68	23.45
5 wickets in innings	0	2	0
10 wickets in match	0	0	0
Best bowling	1/25	5/30	4/25
Catches/stumpings	0/–	15/–	27/–
- Source: CricketArchive, 27 September 2021

Sonia Balu Odedra (born 3 June 1988) is an English cricketer who most recently played for Nottinghamshire and Lightning. She is a right-arm medium-fast bowler and right-handed batter. Her sole match for England was a Test match against India at Wormsley in August 2014.

== Early life ==
Odedra was born on 3 June 1988 in Isleworth, Greater London. She is of Gujarati Indian descent.

== Domestic career ==
Odedra made her county debut for Leicestershire in 2008, before moving to Nottinghamshire ahead of the 2009 season. Her best county bowling performance of five wickets for 30 runs came against Middlesex on 31 July 2011. She made her county high score of 112 in a County Championship match against Devon on 12 June 2016.

Odedra played for Loughborough Lightning in the Women's Cricket Super League between 2016 and 2018 before joining Western Storm for the 2019 season, where she helped the team to the title and took one wicket in the final against Southern Vipers.

In 2021, Odedra played for Lightning in the women's domestic structure. She was the side's joint-leading wicket-taker in the 2021 Charlotte Edwards Cup, with 6 wickets at an average of 21.00. She was also in the Southern Brave squad for the 2021 season of The Hundred, but did not play a match.

== International career ==
Odedra was called up to the Test and ODI squads to face India in August 2014. She made her England debut in the Test at Wormsley on 10 August, taking one wicket for 50 runs across two innings. She did not play in the subsequent ODI series and has not appeared for England since her sole Test match.
