= King Edmund School =

Coordinates: 51.5963°N 0.7009°E

The King Edmund school
- KES

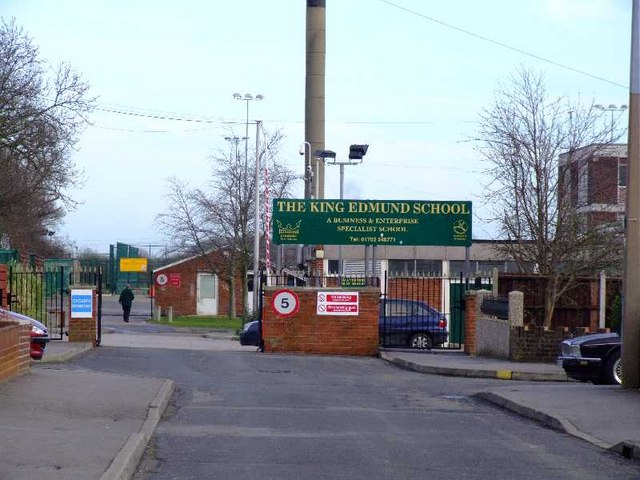

Location
- Vaughan close Essex, SS4 1TL; England

Information
- Type: Academy
- School district: Rochford
- Specialists: Business and enterprise and applied learning
- Department for Education URN: 136868 Tables
- Ofsted: Reports
- Chair of governors: P Thorn
- Head teacher: Jo Ingate
- Staff: 250 (approx)
- Gender: Coeducational
- Age: 11 to 19
- Houses: Romans, Saxons, Vikings
- Website: http://www.kes.essex.sch.uk/

The King Edmund School is a coeducational secondary school and sixth form located in Rochford, Essex, England. It is a specialist BEC and applied learning college. It teaches a variety of subjects including: modern foreign languages, hospitality, technology, performing arts, business studies, humanities, social sciences, law as well as the core subjects including: Maths, English and Science. The Sixth Form is mixed with Year 12 and 13 students.

== History ==
Established in 1961, the King Edmund school was formed by the merging of the Wakering secondary school, and the Rochford secondary school located at the schools current site.

The school converted into an academy in July 2011.

In 2012, the school celebrated its 50th anniversary with a community fun day and exhibition.

In 2022, was closed from November to late January due to the discovery of asbestos during construction work for a new building. Approximately 1,570 students were taught off-site or through virtual learning during the closure, and the Department for Education expressed regret for the disruption, citing the need to learn lessons from the incident. As of 2023, the school has since reopened.

On 19 October 2023, the school closed early from building works as a mains water pipe was damaged due to the construction work for the new building. Students had to contact parents to arrange travel.

== Controversies ==
=== Crowded Corridor Incident ===
On 8 October 2020, concerns related to the COVID-19 pandemic spread due to a photograph depicting students crowded in a hallway within the school premises, raising alarm among parents and the wider community. This incident occurred shortly after the school confirmed a positive COVID-19 case in one of its Year 13 pupils. Headteacher Jonathan Osborn attributed the crowding to adverse weather conditions and a high student volume inside the school, but some parents expressed anxieties about their children's safety, fearing potential virus transmission. The situation prompted discussions about adherence to social distancing measures and safety protocols within the school, and the headteacher acknowledged the need for a review of processes concerning student re-entry into the building.

=== Former Teacher Jailed ===
In 2022, Bobby Rudd, a former teacher who had previously served as the Head of Music at King Edmund School, was incarcerated due to a string of child sex offenses. He was jailed for two years and four months with five counts of sexual activity with a child by a person in a position of trust and engaging in sexual communications with a child and causing a child to watch a sexual act. He was also a music teacher at Shoebury High School

== Academics ==
In the academic year 2014/2015; 52% of students achieved five GCSE grades at A* to C, 67% of A level students achieved three A level grades of A* to E.

As of 2024, the school's most recent inspection by Ofsted was in 2024, with a judgement of Good.

== Notable former pupils ==
- Keith Huewen - former motorcycle racer now TV sports broadcaster
- Mike Penning - MP for Hemel Hempstead
- Kelly Castle - Female professional cricketer and coach. Essex captain. Former Sunrisers captain.
