= Worcestershire Women cricket team =

English county cricket team

Worcestershire Women

Personnel
- Captain: Clare Boycott

Team information
- Founded: Unknown First recorded match: 1949
- Home ground: Various including Chester Road, Kidderminster

History
- WCC wins: 0
- T20 Cup wins: 0
- Official website: Worcestershire Cricket

The Worcestershire Women's cricket team is the women's representative cricket team for the English historic county of Worcestershire. They play their home games at various grounds across the county, including Chester Road, Kidderminster and Stourbridge Road, Himley. They are captained by Clare Boycott. In 2019, they played in Division Two of the final season of the Women's County Championship, and have since competed in the Women's Twenty20 Cup. They were partnered with the West Midlands regional side Central Sparks.

== History ==
Worcestershire Women played their first recorded match in 1949, against Cheshire, which they won by 75 runs. They joined the Women's County Championship in 2004, as part of the County Challenge Cup, and placed 2nd in their group in their first season.

Worcestershire gained promotion from Division Three in 2009, topping the league with 7 wins from 10 games. They were relegated a season later, but immediately regained their place in Division 2, being promoted in 2011. Worcestershire have since retained their position in Division 2, apart from a brief stint in Division 3E in 2018.

They also joined the Women's Twenty20 Cup in 2009 for its inaugural season. When the competition was regionalised, Worcestershire gained promotion to Division Midlands & North 1 in 2011, beating Northamptonshire in the Division Final by 45 runs. Since the tournament's national structure was implemented, Worcestershire have been as low as Division 3 and as high as Division 1. Their promotion to Division 1 in 2017 was a high-point, with Worcestershire bowler Clare Boycott ending the season as the leading wicket-taker in the division. In 2021, they competed in the West Midlands Group of the Twenty20 Cup, finishing 3rd in the group with 2 victories. They won their group in the 2022 Women's Twenty20 Cup, topping the initial group stage before emerging victorious on the group Finals Day. Worcestershire batter Georgina Macey was the second-highest run-scorer across the whole competition, with 295 runs. They also competed in the West Midlands Regional Cup in 2022, winning the initial group stage but losing in the final to Wales. They won the West Midlands Regional Cup in 2023, beating Staffordshire in the final. In 2024, the side finished 2nd in their group in the Twenty20 Cup and 3rd in their group in the new ECB Women's County One-Day tournament.

== Players ==
=== Current squad ===
Based on appearances in the 2023 season.

| Name | Nationality | Birth date | Batting style | Bowling style | Notes |
Batters
| Ami Campbell | England | 6 June 1991 (age 34) | Left-handed | Right-arm medium | On loan from North East Warriors |
| Milly Home | England | 27 February 2001 (age 25) | Right-handed | Right-arm medium | On loan from Warwickshire |
| Rosie Ward | England | Unknown | Unknown | Unknown | |
All-rounders
| Emily Arlott | England | 23 February 1998 (age 28) | Right-handed | Right-arm medium | |
| Gabrielle Basketter | England | 12 April 1993 (age 33) | Right-handed | Right-arm off break | |
| Clare Boycott | England | 31 December 1993 (age 32) | Right-handed | Right-arm medium | |
| Millie Carr | England | Unknown | Unknown | Unknown | |
| Charis Pavely ‡ | England | 25 October 2004 (age 21) | Left-handed | Slow left-arm orthodox | |
Wicket-keepers
| Olivia Gough | England | Unknown | Unknown | Unknown | |
| Chloe Hill | England | 3 January 1997 (age 29) | Right-handed | – | Club captain |
| Georgina Macey | England | 25 January 1995 (age 31) | Right-handed | – | |
| Ellie Roberts | England | Unknown | Unknown | Unknown | |
Bowlers
| Ellie Anderson | England | 30 October 2003 (age 22) | Right-handed | Right-arm medium | |
| Flora Bertwistle | England | 1 May 1999 (age 26) | Left-handed | Slow left-arm orthodox | |
| Phoebe Brett | England | Unknown | Unknown | Unknown | |
| Bryony Gillgrass | England | Unknown | Unknown | Unknown | |
| Hannah Hardwick | England | 1 May 2004 (age 21) | Right-handed | Right-arm medium | |
| Jessica Humby | England | 22 October 1997 (age 28) | Right-handed | Right-arm medium | |
| Amy Maund | England | 5 June 2004 (age 21) | Right-handed | Right-arm medium | |
| Charlotte Roberts | England | Unknown | Unknown | Unknown | |
| Melissa Watson | England | Unknown | Unknown | Unknown | |

=== Notable players ===
Players who have played for Worcestershire and played internationally are listed below, in order of first international appearance (given in brackets):

- (Pakistan) Zehmarad Afzal (2000)
- (Netherlands) Miranda Veringmeier (2008)
- (New Zealand) Sian Ruck (2009)
- (Netherlands) Heather Siegers (2018)
- (England) Sarah Glenn (2019)
- (England) Issy Wong (2022)
- (England) Hannah Baker (2024)
- (England) Charis Pavely (2024)
- (England) Emily Arlott (2025)
- (Italy) Chloe Piparo (2025)

== Seasons ==
=== Women's County Championship ===
| Season | Division | League standings | | | | | | | | Notes |
| Season | Division | P | W | L | T | A/C | BP | Pts | Pos | Notes |
|---|---|---|---|---|---|---|---|---|---|---|
| 2004 | County Challenge Cup G3 | 3 | 2 | 1 | 0 | 0 | 25 | 49 | 2nd | |
| 2005 | County Challenge Cup G3 | 2 | 0 | 1 | 0 | 1 | 5 | 16 | 4th | |
| 2006 | County Challenge Cup G3 | 3 | 1 | 2 | 0 | 0 | 10 | 30 | 3rd | |
| 2007 | County Challenge Cup G2 | 3 | 2 | 0 | 0 | 1 | 0 | 60 | 1st | Promoted |
| 2008 | Division 4 | 6 | 1 | 5 | 0 | 0 | 17 | 37 | 3rd | |
| 2009 | Division 3 | 10 | 7 | 3 | 0 | 0 | 11 | 151 | 1st | Promoted |
| 2010 | Division 2 | 10 | 0 | 10 | 0 | 0 | 35 | 35 | 6th | Relegated |
| 2011 | Division 3 | 9 | 3 | 5 | 1 | 0 | 57 | 92 | 4th | Promoted |
| 2012 | Division 2 | 8 | 4 | 1 | 0 | 3 | 31 | 71 | 2nd | |
| 2013 | Division 2 | 8 | 4 | 3 | 0 | 1 | 40 | 80 | 3rd | |
| 2014 | Division 2 | 8 | 1 | 6 | 0 | 1 | 30 | 40 | 8th | |
| 2015 | Division 2 | 8 | 4 | 3 | 0 | 1 | 45 | 85 | 3rd | |
| 2016 | Division 2 | 7 | 2 | 4 | 0 | 1 | 32 | 52 | 6th | |
| 2017 | Division 2 | 7 | 1 | 5 | 0 | 1 | 26 | 36 | 7th | Relegated |
| 2018 | Division 3E | 6 | 4 | 1 | 0 | 1 | 37 | 77 | 1st | Promoted |
| 2019 | Division 2 | 7 | 2 | 5 | 0 | 0 | 33 | 53 | 6th | |

=== Women's Twenty20 Cup ===
| Season | Division | League standings | | | | | | | | Notes |
| Season | Division | P | W | L | T | A/C | NRR | Pts | Pos | Notes |
|---|---|---|---|---|---|---|---|---|---|---|
| 2009 | Division 4 | 3 | 2 | 1 | 0 | 0 | −0.30 | 4 | 3rd | |
| 2010 | Division M&N 2 | 3 | 2 | 0 | 0 | 1 | +0.53 | 5 | 2nd | Lost promotion play-off |
| 2011 | Division M&N 2 | 3 | 2 | 1 | 0 | 0 | −0.46 | 4 | 2nd | Promoted |
| 2012 | Division M&N 1 | 3 | 1 | 2 | 0 | 0 | −0.91 | 2 | 3rd | |
| 2013 | Division M&N 1 | 3 | 1 | 2 | 0 | 0 | −0.87 | 2 | 3rd | |
| 2014 | Division 2A | 4 | 1 | 3 | 0 | 0 | −1.81 | 4 | 9th | Relegated |
| 2015 | Division 3 | 8 | 8 | 0 | 0 | 0 | +2.77 | 32 | 1st | Promoted |
| 2016 | Division 2 | 7 | 4 | 3 | 0 | 0 | +0.35 | 16 | 4th | |
| 2017 | Division 2 | 8 | 5 | 3 | 0 | 0 | +0.33 | 20 | 2nd | Promoted |
| 2018 | Division 1 | 8 | 1 | 7 | 0 | 0 | −1.36 | 4 | 9th | Relegated |
| 2019 | Division 2 | 8 | 3 | 3 | 0 | 2 | +0.27 | 14 | 6th | |
| 2021 | West Midlands | 8 | 2 | 2 | 0 | 4 | –1.19 | 12 | 3rd | |
| 2022 | Group 2 | 6 | 5 | 1 | 0 | 0 | +1.87 | 20 | 1st | Group winners |
| 2023 | Group 2 | 6 | 0 | 0 | 0 | 6 | +0.00 | 6 | 4th | |
| 2024 | Group 2 | 8 | 5 | 1 | 0 | 2 | +3.87 | 93 | 2nd | |

=== ECB Women's County One-Day ===
| Season | Group | League standings | | | | | | | | Notes |
| Season | Group | P | W | L | T | A/C | BP | Pts | Pos | Notes |
|---|---|---|---|---|---|---|---|---|---|---|
| 2024 | Group 3 | 4 | 3 | 1 | 0 | 0 | 2 | 14 | 3rd | |

== Honours ==
- Women's Twenty20 Cup:
  - Group winners (1) – 2022

== See also ==
- Worcestershire County Cricket Club
- Central Sparks
