= 2009 Women's County Championship =

- Administrator(s): England and Wales Cricket Board
- Cricket format: 50 over
- Tournament format(s): League system
- Champions: Kent (3rd title)
- Participants: 34
- Most runs: Heather Knight (622)
- Most wickets: Charlotte Anneveld (24)

The 2009 Women's County One-Day Championship was the 13th cricket Women's County Championship season. It ran from May to September and saw 30 county teams and teams representing Ireland, Scotland, Wales and the Netherlands compete in a series of divisions. Kent Women won the County Championship as winners of the top division, going through the season unbeaten and winning their third title.

== Competition format ==
Teams played matches within a series of divisions with the winners of the top division being crowned County Champions. Matches were played using a one day format with 50 overs per side.

The championship works on a points system with positions within the divisions being based on the total points. Points were awarded as follows:

Win: 20 points.
Tie: 15 points.
Loss: Bonus points.
Abandoned or No Result: 10 points.
Cancelled No Play: 5 points.

Up to four batting and four bowling points were available to the losing side only, or both sides in an incomplete match.

== Teams ==
The 2009 Championship was divided into five divisions: Divisions One to Four with six teams apiece and Division Five with 10 teams split across two regional groups.

Teams in the top four Divisions played each other twice, and teams in Division Five played each other once.

Division One	Berkshire	Kent	Nottinghamshire	Somerset	Surrey	Sussex
Division Two	Cheshire	Essex	Lancashire	Middlesex	Warwickshire	Yorkshire
Division Three	Derbyshire	Devon	Hampshire	Scotland	Staffordshire	Worcestershire
Division Four	Cornwall	Durham	Hertfordshire	Norfolk	Northamptonshire	Wales
Division Five North & East	Cumbria	Ireland	Suffolk	Northumberland		
Division Five South & West	Dorset	Gloucestershire	Netherlands	Oxfordshire	Shropshire	Wiltshire

== Division One ==
Team	Pld	W	L	T	A	Bat	Bowl	Ded	Pts
Kent (C)	10	10	0	0	0	0	0	0	200
Sussex	10	8	2	0	0	3	1	0	164
Nottinghamshire	10	6	4	0	0	9	8	0	137
Somerset	10	3	7	0	0	6	8	0	74
Berkshire	10	2	8	0	0	10	20	0	70
Surrey (R)	10	1	9	0	0	16	15	0	51

Source: ECB Women's County Championship

== Division Two ==
Team	Pld	W	L	T	A	Bat	Bowl	Ded	Pts
Yorkshire (P)	10	10	0	0	0	0	0	0	200
Middlesex	10	7	3	0	0	5	9	0	154
Essex	10	4	6	0	0	11	12	0	103
Cheshire	10	4	6	0	0	6	13	0	99
Warwickshire	10	4	6	0	0	7	9	0	96
Lancashire (R)	10	1	9	0	0	6	16	0	42

Source: ECB Women's County Championship

== Division Three ==
Team	Pld	W	L	T	A	Bat	Bowl	Ded	Pts
Worcestershire (P)	10	7	3	0	0	2	9	0	151
Devon	10	7	2	0	1	3	2	0	150
Staffordshire	10	6	1	0	3	0	0	0	135
Scotland	10	4	5	0	1	5	9	0	79
Hampshire	10	2	8	0	0	9	7	0	56
Derbyshire (R)	10	1	8	0	1	8	14	0	47

Source: ECB Women's County Championship

== Division Four ==
Team	Pld	W	L	T	A	Bat	Bowl	Ded	Pts
Wales (P)	10	9	1	0	0	2	3	0	185
Durham	10	8	2	0	0	3	2	0	165
Hertfordshire	10	7	3	0	0	3	8	0	151
Northamptonshire	10	4	6	0	0	6	19	0	105
Cornwall	10	1	9	0	0	6	24	0	50
Norfolk (R)	10	1	9	0	0	5	15	0	40

Source: ECB Women's County Championship

== Division Five ==
=== North & East ===
Team	Pld	W	L	T	A	Bat	Bowl	Ded	Pts
Cumbria (PO)	3	2	1	0	0	1	4	0	45
Ireland	3	2	1	0	0	1	3	0	44
Suffolk	3	1	2	0	0	2	3	0	25
Northumberland	3	1	2	0	0	0	4	0	24

Source: ECB Women's County Championship

=== South & West ===
Team	Pld	W	L	T	A	Bat	Bowl	Ded	Pts
Netherlands (PO)	5	4	0	0	1	0	0	0	85
Gloucestershire	5	4	1	0	0	2	2	0	84
Shropshire	5	3	2	0	0	2	6	0	68
Oxfordshire	5	2	3	0	0	4	4	0	48
Dorset	5	1	4	0	0	2	10	0	32
Wiltshire	5	0	4	0	1	3	4	0	12

Source: ECB Women's County Championship

=== Play-off ===
6 September 2009	Cumbria	v	Netherlands	Match cancelled
Scorecard	Cumbria	v	Netherlands
No toss.; No play was possible due to rain.; Netherlands are promoted to Division Four by virtue of better group stage record.

== Statistics ==
=== Most runs ===
Player	Team	Matches	Innings	Runs	Average	HS	100s	50s
Heather Knight	Devon	8	8	622	155.50	161*	4	0
Charlotte Edwards	Kent	10	10	491	81.83	128*	1	3
Salliann Briggs	Yorkshire	10	10	471	47.10	82	0	4
Jenny Gunn	Nottinghamshire	10	10	465	51.66	110*	1	3
Beth Morgan	Middlesex	10	10	437	72.83	79*	0	6

Source: CricketArchive

=== Most wickets ===
Player	Team	Balls	Wickets	Average	BBI	5w
Charlotte Anneveld	Kent	557	24	12.16	4/17	0
Jane Riddell	Durham	474	23	8.08	5/15	1
Holly Colvin	Sussex	426	20	10.25	6/13	2
Charlotte Edwards	Kent	520	20	11.50	3/6	0
Lorna Starkey	Cheshire	546	19	10.00	3/15	0

Source: CricketArchive
