= Bethan Ellis =

English cricketer (born 1999)

Personal information
- Full name: Bethan Louisa Ellis
- Born: 7 July 1999 (age 27)
- Batting: Right-handed
- Bowling: Right-arm medium
- Role: All-rounder

Domestic team information
- Years: Team
- 2015–2020: Warwickshire
- 2016: → Shropshire (on loan)
- 2017–2018: → Worcestershire (on loan)
- 2020–2022: Lightning
- 2021: Derbyshire
- 2022–present: Warwickshire
- 2023–2024: Central Sparks

Career statistics
Competition	WLA	WT20
Matches	52	56
Runs scored	784	551
Batting average	23.05	19.67
100s/50s	0/6	0/2
Top score	74	57*
Balls bowled	1,321	665
Wickets	35	46
Bowling average	26.02	14.56
5 wickets in innings	0	0
10 wickets in match	0	0
Best bowling	4/20	4/21
Catches/stumpings	14/–	11/–
- Source: CricketArchive, 16 October 2024

Bethan Louisa Ellis (born 7 July 1999) is an English cricketer who currently plays for Warwickshire. She plays primarily as a right-arm medium bowler, as a well as a right-handed top-order batter. She has previously played for Shropshire, Worcestershire, Derbyshire, Lightning and Central Sparks.

== Early life ==
Ellis was born on 7 July 1999, and grew up in Leamington Spa, Warwickshire. She has a degree in Sports Science from the University of Birmingham.

== Domestic career ==
Ellis began playing for Warwickshire at Under-13 level, and made her debut for the senior team in 2015, in a match against Surrey. She scored 2* and did not bowl. In 2016, she went on loan to Shropshire, and was the joint-second leading wicket-taker in their win of Division 4 S&W in the County Championship. In 2017 and 2018, Ellis split her time between Warwickshire and Worcestershire. In the 2017 Women's County Championship, she achieved her List A best bowling of 4/20 against Wales.

In 2019, Ellis played every match for Warwickshire, in a season that saw them win the Women's Twenty20 Cup. She was the joint-second leading wicket-taker in Division 1, with 10 wickets at an average of 13.00. She also achieved her List A high score of 74 in a County Championship match against Kent. Ahead of the 2021 season, Ellis joined Derbyshire, and was the side's leading run-scorer in that season's Twenty20 Cup, with 140 runs. She also achieved her maiden Twenty20 half-century, scoring 55* against Shropshire. She re-joined Warwickshire for the 2022 season, taking five wickets and scoring 78 runs in the Women's Twenty20 Cup. In the Group 3 final against Somerset, Ellis hit 57* to guide her side to victory.

In 2020, Ellis played for Lightning in the Rachael Heyhoe Flint Trophy. She took 6 wickets in 6 matches at an average of 35.00, as well as scoring 62 in a match against Central Sparks, sharing a 148-run opening stand with Sarah Bryce. In December 2020, it was announced that Ellis was one of the 41 female cricketers that had signed a full-time domestic contract. In 2021, Ellis only played one match for Lightning, and was forced to withdraw from the Welsh Fire squad for The Hundred due to injury. She played nine matches for Lightning in 2022, across the Charlotte Edwards Cup and the Rachael Heyhoe Flint Trophy, scoring 74 runs but bowling just two deliveries.

Ahead of the 2023 season, it was announced that Ellis had joined Central Sparks from Lightning. That season, she played 13 matches for Central Sparks, across the Rachael Heyhoe Flint Trophy and the Charlotte Edwards Cup, and was the side's joint-leading wicket-taker in the Charlotte Edwards Cup, with 9 wickets at an average of 13.33. In 2024, she played 15 matches for Central Sparks, across the Rachael Heyhoe Flint Trophy and the Charlotte Edwards Cup, scoring 215 runs and taking 10 wickets in the Rachael Heyhoe Flint Trophy.
