= Charis Pavely =

English cricketer

Personal information
- Full name: Charis Rebekah Pavely
- Born: 25 October 2004 (age 22); Redditch, Worcestershire, England
- Batting: Left-handed
- Bowling: Slow left-arm orthodox
- Role: All-rounder

International information
- National side: England
- T20I debut (cap 64): 14 September 2024 v Ireland
- Last T20I: 15 September 2024 v Ireland

Domestic team information
- Years: Team
- 2021–2024: Worcestershire
- 2023–2024: Central Sparks
- 2023–2024: Birmingham Phoenix
- 2025–present: Warwickshire

Career statistics
Competition	WT20I	WLA	WT20
Matches	2	30	51
Runs scored	9	908	422
Batting average	4.50	45.40	14.55
100s/50s	0/0	2/6	0/1
Top score	8	128*	68*
Balls bowled	48	823	746
Wickets	3	26	32
Bowling average	17.66	24.88	26.96
5 wickets in innings	0	0	0
10 wickets in match	0	0	0
Best bowling	3/19	4/31	3/7
Catches/stumpings	1/–	12/–	19/–
- Source: CricketArchive, 7 May 2026

Charis Rebekah Pavely (born 25 October 2004) is an English cricketer who currently plays for Warwickshire and London Spirit. She plays as a left-handed batter and slow left-arm orthodox bowler.

== Early life ==
Pavely was born on 25 October 2004 in Redditch, Worcestershire. Pavely was diagnosed with ADHD as a teenager.

== Domestic career ==
Pavely made her county debut in 2021, for Worcestershire against Berkshire. In the 2022 Women's Twenty20 Cup, she took 3/7 from her four overs in a match against Shropshire.

Pavely was included in the Central Sparks Academy squad between 2021 and 2023. She was promoted to the full squad ahead of the 2023 season. She made her debut for the side on 4 June 2023, against Western Storm in the Charlotte Edwards Cup. She went on to play eight matches for the side overall that season, including scoring 57* against South East Stars in the Rachael Heyhoe Flint Trophy. She also played three matches for Birmingham Phoenix in The Hundred, taking one wicket. At the end of the 2023 season, it was announced that Pavely had signed her first professional contract with Central Sparks. In 2024, she played 15 matches for Central Sparks, across the Rachael Heyhoe Flint Trophy and the Charlotte Edwards Cup, taking 20 wickets.

== International career ==
In October 2022, Pavely was selected in the England Under-19 squad for the 2023 ICC Under-19 Women's T20 World Cup. She played six matches at the tournament, scoring 93 runs with a top score of 45 from 26 deliveries against Zimbabwe. Pavely made her made her senior England debut against Ireland in a T20I in Dublin on 14 September 2024, taking three wickets for 19 runs from her four overs.
