= Ellie Anderson =

English cricketer

Personal information
- Full name: Ellie Anderson
- Born: 30 October 2003 (age 23); Wolverhampton, West Midlands, England
- Batting: Right-handed
- Bowling: Right-arm medium
- Role: Bowler

Domestic team information
- Years: Team
- 2018–2024: Worcestershire
- 2023–2024: Central Sparks
- 2024: → Western Storm (on loan)
- 2025: Somerset

Career statistics
Competition	WLA	WT20
Matches	27	37
Runs scored	228	34
Batting average	19.00	4.85
100s/50s	67*	0/0
Top score	0/2	8
Balls bowled	841	562
Wickets	27	31
Bowling average	31.03	21.80
5 wickets in innings	0	0
10 wickets in match	0	0
Best bowling	3/9	4/9
Catches/stumpings	5/–	4/–
- Source: CricketArchive, 6 August 2025

Ellie Anderson (born 30 October 2003) is an English cricketer who currently plays for Somerset. She plays as a right-arm medium bowler.

== Early life ==
Anderson was born on 30 October 2003 in Wolverhampton, West Midlands.

== Domestic career ==
Anderson made her county debut in 2018, for Worcestershire against Warwickshire. She was the joint sixth-highest wicket-taker across the entire competition in the 2022 Women's Twenty20 Cup, taking 12 wickets at an average of 12.00. She played one match in the 2023 Women's Twenty20 Cup, taking 1/22 from her four overs against Warwickshire.

Anderson was included in the Central Sparks Academy squad between 2021 and 2023. She was promoted to the full squad ahead of the 2023 season. She made her debut for Central Sparks on 29 May 2023, against North West Thunder in the Charlotte Edwards Cup. She played five matches overall for the side that season, taking two wickets. She was also signed by Southern Brave for The Hundred, but did not play a match.

In April 2023, it was announced that she had gone on month-long loan from Central Sparks to Western Storm. The loan was later extended until the end of the season. She played 16 matches for Western Storm, across the Rachael Heyhoe Flint Trophy and the Charlotte Edwards Cup, taking 15 wickets with best bowling figures of 4/9.

== International career ==
In October 2022, Anderson was selected in the England Under-19 squad for the 2023 ICC Under-19 Women's T20 World Cup. She took eight wickets at an average of 5.62 at the tournament, including taking a five-wicket haul, with 5/12 against the West Indies.
