= 2022 Sunrisers (women's cricket) season =

English cricket season

Sunrisers
2022 season
- Coach: Laura Marsh
- Captain: Kelly Castle
- RHFT: 8th
- CEC: Group A, 4th
- Most runs: RHFT: Grace Scrivens (297); CEC: Naomi Dattani (157)
- Most wickets: RHFT: Grace Scrivens (13); CEC: Kelly Castle (7) & Grace Scrivens (7)
- Most catches: RHFT: Cordelia Griffith (5) & Naomi Dattani (5); CEC: Kelly Castle (3)
- Most wicket-keeping dismissals: RHFT: Amara Carr (6); CEC: Scarlett Hughes (9)

The 2022 season was Sunrisers' third season, in which competed in the 50 over Rachael Heyhoe Flint Trophy and the Twenty20 Charlotte Edwards Cup. In the Charlotte Edwards Cup, the side finished bottom of Group A, losing all six of their six matches. In the Rachael Heyhoe Flint Trophy, the side finished bottom of the group, losing six of their seven matches, with the other cancelled.

The side was captained by Kelly Castle in all formats, retaining the captaincy in the Charlotte Edwards Cup whilst also replacing Amara Carr as captain in the Rachael Heyhoe Flint Trophy. Laura Marsh coached the side, replacing Trevor Griffin on an interim basis for the season. They played four home matches at the County Ground, Chelmsford and two at the County Ground, Northampton.

== Squad ==
=== Changes ===
On 29 October 2021, it was announced that Grace Scrivens had been awarded a professional contract with the side, having previously been on a temporary contract. On 25 November 2021, it was announced that Fran Wilson had left the side, joining Western Storm. On 30 March 2022, the side announced the signing of Abtaha Maqsood until the end of July. In April 2022, Kelly Castle became all-format captain of the side (previously, Castle had captained the side in the Charlotte Edwards Cup whilst Amara Carr captained in the Rachael Heyhoe Flint Trophy) and Trevor Griffin stepped down from his role as head coach for personal reasons. Laura Marsh was announced as Griffin's replacement on an interim basis for the 2022 season. On 11 May 2022, it was announced by Lightning that they had signed Katie Midwood from Sunrisers. Sunrisers announced their 17-player squad for the season on 12 May 2022, confirming the addition of Jodi Grewcock and Scarlett Hughes, and the departure of Emily Thorpe, Katie Wolfe and Emily Woodhouse. Jessica Olorenshaw was promoted from the Academy squad to the senior squad on 8 July 2022.

=== Squad list ===
- Age given is at the start of Sunrisers' first match of the season (14 May 2022).

Name	Nationality	Birth date	Batting style	Bowling style	Notes
Batters
Jodi Grewcock	England	30 November 2004 (aged 17)	Left-handed	Right-arm leg break	
Cordelia Griffith	England	19 September 1995 (aged 26)	Right-handed	Right-arm medium	
Florence Miller	England	26 February 2004 (aged 18)	Right-handed	Right-arm medium	
All-rounders
Kelly Castle	England	4 September 1997 (aged 24)	Right-handed	Right-arm medium	Captain
Kate Coppack	England	30 August 1994 (aged 27)	Right-handed	Right-arm medium	
Naomi Dattani	England	28 April 1994 (aged 28)	Left-handed	Left-arm medium	
Jo Gardner	England	25 March 1997 (aged 25)	Right-handed	Right-arm off break	
Alice Macleod	England	14 May 1994 (aged 28)	Right-handed	Right-arm off break	
Grace Scrivens	England	10 November 2003 (aged 18)	Left-handed	Right-arm off break	
Katherine Speed	England	5 October 2001 (aged 20)	Right-handed	Right-arm medium	
Wicket-keepers
Amara Carr	England	17 April 1994 (aged 28)	Right-handed	—	
Scarlett Hughes	England	18 June 2002 (aged 19)	Right-handed	—	
Jessica Olorenshaw	England	27 January 2005 (aged 17)	Right-handed	Right-arm medium	Joined July 2022
Mia Rogers	England	29 January 2002 (aged 20)	Right-handed	—	
Bowlers
Gayatri Gole	England	22 July 1998 (aged 23)	Right-handed	Right-arm medium	
Abtaha Maqsood	Scotland	11 June 1999 (aged 22)	Right-handed	Right-arm leg break	Signed until end of July 2022
Sonali Patel	England	23 May 2003 (aged 18)	Right-handed	Right-arm medium	
Mady Villiers	England	26 August 1998 (aged 23)	Right-handed	Right-arm off break	

== Charlotte Edwards Cup ==
=== Group A ===
Pos	Team	Pld	W	L	T	NR	BP	Pts	NRR
1	South East Stars (Q)	6	5	1	0	0	1	21	0.660
2	Central Sparks (Q)	6	4	2	0	0	1	17	0.552
3	Western Storm	6	3	3	0	0	1	13	0.148
4	Sunrisers	6	0	6	0	0	0	0	−1.287

Source: England and Wales Cricket Board
- advanced to the semi-final

=== Fixtures ===
14 May 2022
14:30 BST
Scorecard

Sunrisers; 122/6 (20 overs)	v	South East Stars; 123/4 (16.5 overs)
Cordelia Griffith 26 (28); Emma Jones 1/2 (1 over)		Aylish Cranstone 56* (46); Jo Gardner 1/15 (3 overs)

South East Stars won by 6 wickets
County Ground, Chelmsford
Umpires: Neil Pratt and Sarah Bartlett

- South East Stars won the toss and elected to field.
- Points: South East Stars 4, Sunrisers 0

18 May 2022
19:00 BST (D/N)
Scorecard

Sunrisers; 160/5 (20 overs)	v	Western Storm; 164/9 (20 overs)
Grace Scrivens 56 (42); Heather Knight 1/22 (4 overs)		Katie George 34 (23); Grace Scrivens 4/33 (4 overs)

Western Storm won by 1 wicket
County Ground, Chelmsford
Umpires: Chris Watts and Sue Redfern

- Western Storm won the toss and chose to field.
- Points: Western Storm 4, Sunrisers 0

21 May 2022
14:30 BST
Scorecard

Central Sparks; 153/5 (20 overs)	v	Sunrisers; 129/8 (20 overs)
Amy Jones 80 (49); Kelly Castle 2/19 (4 overs)		Naomi Dattani 51 (32); Sarah Glenn 2/14 (4 overs)

Central Sparks won by 24 runs
Edgbaston Cricket Ground, Birmingham
Umpires: Grace Bambury and Sue Redfern

- Sunrisers won the toss and elected to field.
- Points: Central Sparks 4, Sunrisers 0

29 May 2022
11:00 BST
Scorecard

Western Storm; 169/5 (20 overs)	v	Sunrisers; 128/6 (20 overs)
Sophie Luff 78 (54); Kelly Castle 2/16 (3 overs)		Naomi Dattani 53 (51); Danielle Gibson 2/13 (2 overs)

Western Storm won by 41 runs
County Ground, Taunton
Umpires: Alex Wharf and Sophie McLelland

- Western Storm won the toss and elected to bat.
- Points: Western Storm 5, Sunrisers 0

1 June 2022
14:30 BST
Scorecard

Central Sparks; 146/5 (20 overs)	v	Sunrisers; 143/6 (20 overs)
Evelyn Jones 69 (62); Naomi Dattani 2/39 (4 overs)		Jo Gardner 41 (30); Elizabeth Russell 2/24 (4 overs)

Central Sparks won by 3 runs
County Ground, Northampton
Umpires: Billy Taylor and Jasmine Naeem

- Central Sparks won the toss and elected to bat.
- Points: Central Sparks 4, Sunrisers 0

5 June 2022
14:30 BST
Scorecard

South East Stars; 183/9 (20 overs)	v	Sunrisers; 127 (17 overs)
Bryony Smith 50 (31); Kelly Castle 2/14 (4 overs)		Amara Carr 31 (27); Kalea Moore 2/16 (3 overs)

South East Stars won by 56 runs
Woodbridge Road, Guildford
Umpires: Anna Harris and Sue Redfern

- South East Stars won the toss and elected to bat.
- Points: South East Stars 5, Sunrisers 0

=== Tournament statistics ===
==== Batting ====
Player	Matches	Innings	Runs	Average	High score	100s	50s
Naomi Dattani	6	6	157	26.16	53	0	2
Grace Scrivens	6	6	141	23.50	56	0	1
Jo Gardner	5	5	94	31.33	41	0	0
Kelly Castle	6	6	73	18.25	40*	0	0
Amara Carr	2	2	68	68.00	37*	0	0
Cordelia Griffith	4	3	67	22.33	26	0	0
Mady Villiers	5	5	54	10.80	22	0	0

Source: ESPN Cricinfo Qualification: 50 runs.

==== Bowling ====
Player	Matches	Overs	Wickets	Average	Economy	BBI	5wi
Kelly Castle	6	20.5	7	16.85	5.66	2/14	0
Grace Scrivens	6	20.0	7	21.71	7.60	4/33	0
Naomi Dattani	6	19.0	6	26.83	8.47	2/30	0
Jo Gardner	5	13.0	5	19.20	7.38	2/23	0
Mady Villiers	5	17.0	5	28.00	8.23	2/33	0

Source: ESPN Cricinfo Qualification: 5 wickets.

== Rachael Heyhoe Flint Trophy ==
=== Season standings ===
Pos	Team	Pld	W	L	T	NR	BP	Pts	NRR
1	Northern Diamonds (Q)	7	6	0	0	1	2	28	0.851
2	South East Stars (Q)	7	5	1	0	1	4	26	0.687
3	Southern Vipers (Q)	7	5	1	0	1	2	24	0.762
4	Western Storm	7	3	3	0	1	1	15	−0.214
5	Central Sparks	7	2	4	0	1	1	11	0.073
6	Lightning	7	2	4	0	1	1	11	−0.630
7	North West Thunder	7	1	5	0	1	0	6	−0.366
8	Sunrisers	7	0	6	0	1	0	2	−1.046

Source: England and Wales Cricket Board

advanced to final advanced to the play-off

=== Fixtures ===
2 July 2022
10:30 BST
Scorecard

South East Stars; 281/8 (50 overs)	v	Sunrisers; 201 (41.4 overs)
Bryony Smith 66 (68); Grace Scrivens 4/42 (10 overs)		Grace Scrivens 74 (74); Bryony Smith 3/37 (10 overs)

South East Stars won by 80 runs
County Ground, Beckenham
Umpires: Grace Bambury and Mark Newell

- South East Stars won the toss and elected to bat.
- Points: South East Stars 5, Sunrisers 0

9 July 2022
10:30 BST
Scorecard

Northern Diamonds; 194 (49.5 overs)	v	Sunrisers; 188 (45.2 overs)
Hollie Armitage 47 (60); Grace Scrivens 4/20 (10 overs)		Naomi Dattani 41 (58); Linsey Smith 3/34 (10 overs)

Northern Diamonds won by 6 runs
Headingley Cricket Ground, Leeds
Umpires: Hassan Adnan and Jasmine Naeem

- Northern Diamonds won the toss and elected to bat.
- Points: Northern Diamonds 4, Sunrisers 0

16 July 2022
10:30 BST
Scorecard

Sunrisers; 254/6 (50 overs)	v	Western Storm; 257/7 (49 overs)
Cordelia Griffith 74 (106); Niamh Holland 2/32 (7 overs)		Sophie Luff 100* (142); Mady Villiers 2/33 (10 overs)

Western Storm won by 3 wickets
County Ground, Chelmsford
Umpires: Bob White and Sophie McLelland

- Sunrisers won the toss and elected to bat.
- Points: Western Storm 4, Sunrisers 0

23 July 2022
10:30 BST
Scorecard

Southern Vipers; 233/9 (50 overs)	v	Sunrisers; 222/8 (50 overs)
Paige Scholfield 74 (72); Kate Coppack 4/48 (9 overs)		Cordelia Griffith 65 (109); Charlie Dean 3/31 (10 overs)

Southern Vipers won by 11 runs
Rose Bowl, Southampton
Umpires: Billy Taylor and Grace Bambury

- Southern Vipers won the toss and elected to bat.
- Points: Southern Vipers 4, Sunrisers 0

9 September 2022
10:30 BST

Sunrisers	v	North West Thunder

No Result
County Ground, Northampton

- The match was postponed due to the death of Queen Elizabeth II, and later deemed a no result with points shared.
- Points: Sunrisers 2, North West Thunder 2

11 September 2022
10:30 BST
Scorecard

Lightning; 230/9 (50 overs)	v	Sunrisers; 160 (41 overs)
Kathryn Bryce 104 (109); Jo Gardner 3/45 (10 overs)		Grace Scrivens 54 (65); Kirstie Gordon 4/31 (10 overs)

Lightning won by 70 runs
County Ground, Chelmsford
Umpires: Neil Bainton and Rose Dovey

- Sunrisers won the toss and elected to field.
- Points: Lightning 5, Sunrisers 0

17 September 2022
10:30 BST
Scorecard

Central Sparks; 260/9 (50 overs)	v	Sunrisers; 121 (28.5 overs)
Emily Arlott 63 (73); Mady Villiers 3/44 (10 overs)		Grace Scrivens 61 (75); Davina Perrin 3/26 (5 overs)

Central Sparks won by 139 runs
New Road, Worcester
Umpires: Jack Shantry and Joanne Ibbotson

- Sunrisers won the toss and elected to field.
- Points: Central Sparks 5, Sunrisers 0

=== Tournament statistics ===
==== Batting ====
Player	Matches	Innings	Runs	Average	High score	100s	50s
Grace Scrivens	6	6	297	49.50	74	0	4
Cordelia Griffith	4	4	178	44.50	74	0	2
Naomi Dattani	6	6	108	18.00	41	0	0

Source: ESPN Cricinfo Qualification: 100 runs.

==== Bowling ====
Player	Matches	Overs	Wickets	Average	Economy	BBI	5wi
Grace Scrivens	6	59.0	13	14.69	3.23	4/20	0
Mady Villiers	6	59.5	12	21.83	4.37	4/36	0
Jo Gardner	6	31.0	6	25.16	4.87	3/45	0
Kate Coppack	6	38.0	6	31.50	4.97	4/48	0

Source: ESPN Cricinfo Qualification: 5 wickets.

== Season statistics ==
=== Batting ===
Player	Rachael Heyhoe Flint Trophy								Charlotte Edwards Cup							
Player	Matches	Innings	Runs	High score	Average	Strike rate	100s	50s	Matches	Innings	Runs	High score	Average	Strike rate	100s	50s
Amara Carr	4	4	61	35	15.25	60.39	0	0	2	2	68	37*	68.00	121.42	0	0
Kelly Castle	5	5	49	17	9.80	77.77	0	0	6	6	73	40*	18.25	100.00	0	0
Kate Coppack	6	4	20	12	10.00	66.66	0	0	–	–	–	–	–	–	–	–
Naomi Dattani	6	6	108	41	18.00	62.42	0	0	6	6	157	53	26.16	109.02	0	2
Jo Gardner	6	6	99	43*	24.75	82.50	0	0	5	5	94	41	31.33	97.91	0	0
Gayatri Gole	1	1	3	3	3.00	42.85	0	0	6	4	12	7*	6.00	100.00	0	0
Jodi Grewcock	2	2	40	35	20.00	44.94	0	0	–	–	–	–	–	–	–	–
Cordelia Griffith	4	4	178	74	44.50	64.49	0	2	4	3	67	26	22.33	95.71	0	0
Scarlett Hughes	1	1	4	4	4.00	50.00	0	0	6	4	16	10	4.00	66.66	0	0
Alice Macleod	1	1	0	0	0.00	0.00	0	0	–	–	–	–	–	–	–	–
Abtaha Maqsood	4	3	7	3	3.50	24.13	0	0	6	1	6	6	6.00	120.00	0	0
Florence Miller	–	–	–	–	–	–	–	–	6	2	16	11*	–	84.21	0	0
Jessica Olorenshaw	5	4	70	25	17.50	73.68	0	0	–	–	–	–	–	–	–	–
Sonali Patel	2	2	10	9*	10.00	37.03	0	0	–	–	–	–	–	–	–	–
Mia Rogers	5	4	21	12*	7.00	61.76	0	0	6	5	37	20	7.40	119.35	0	0
Grace Scrivens	6	6	297	74	49.50	77.54	0	4	6	6	141	56	23.50	119.49	0	1
Katherine Speed	2	2	10	7	5.00	47.61	0	0	2	2	5	3*	5.00	55.55	0	0
Mady Villiers	6	6	63	33	10.50	73.25	0	0	5	5	54	22	10.80	114.89	0	0
Source: ESPN Cricinfo

=== Bowling ===
Player	Rachael Heyhoe Flint Trophy							Charlotte Edwards Cup						
Player	Matches	Overs	Wickets	Average	Economy	BBI	5wi	Matches	Overs	Wickets	Average	Economy	BBI	5wi
Kelly Castle	5	37.0	3	66.33	5.37	1/47	0	6	20.5	7	16.85	5.66	2/14	0
Kate Coppack	6	38.0	6	31.50	4.97	4/48	0	–	–	–	–	–	–	–
Naomi Dattani	6	31.0	3	66.66	6.45	3/19	0	6	19.0	6	26.83	8.47	2/30	0
Jo Gardner	6	31.0	6	25.16	4.87	3/45	0	5	13.0	5	19.20	7.38	2/23	0
Gayatri Gole	1	–	–	–	–	–	–	6	9.0	0	–	10.11	–	0
Jodi Grewcock	2	7.0	2	13.50	3.85	2/27	0	–	–	–	–	–	–	–
Abtaha Maqsood	4	27.0	3	47.33	5.25	1/26	0	6	18.0	3	54.00	9.00	1/15	0
Sonali Patel	2	9.0	1	62.00	6.88	1/37	0	–	–	–	–	–	–	–
Grace Scrivens	6	59.0	13	14.69	3.23	4/20	0	6	20.0	7	21.71	7.60	4/33	0
Mady Villiers	6	59.5	12	21.83	4.37	4/36	0	5	17.0	5	28.00	8.23	2/33	0
Source: ESPN Cricinfo

=== Fielding ===
Player	Rachael Heyhoe Flint Trophy			Charlotte Edwards Cup		
Player	Matches	Innings	Catches	Matches	Innings	Catches
Kelly Castle	5	5	0	6	6	3
Kate Coppack	6	6	1	–	–	–
Naomi Dattani	6	6	5	6	6	0
Jo Gardner	6	6	1	5	5	2
Gayatri Gole	1	1	0	6	6	1
Jodi Grewcock	2	2	1	–	–	–
Cordelia Griffith	4	4	5	4	4	0
Scarlett Hughes	1	–	–	6	2	1
Alice Macleod	1	1	1	–	–	–
Abtaha Maqsood	4	4	1	6	6	0
Florence Miller	–	–	–	6	6	1
Jessica Olorenshaw	5	5	1	–	–	–
Sonali Patel	2	2	1	–	–	–
Mia Rogers	5	4	1	6	6	0
Grace Scrivens	6	6	1	6	6	1
Katherine Speed	2	2	0	2	2	0
Mady Villiers	6	6	1	5	5	2
Source: ESPN Cricinfo

=== Wicket-keeping ===
Player	Rachael Heyhoe Flint Trophy				Charlotte Edwards Cup			
Player	Matches	Innings	Catches	Stumpings	Matches	Innings	Catches	Stumpings
Amara Carr	4	4	4	2	2	2	4	1
Scarlett Hughes	1	1	2	2	6	4	2	7
Mia Rogers	5	1	1	0	6	–	–	–
Source: ESPN Cricinfo
