= 2021 Sunrisers (women's cricket) season =

Sunrisers
2021 season
- Coach: Trevor Griffin
- Captain: Amara Carr (50-over); Kelly Castle (T20)
- RHFT: 8th
- CEC: Group B, 4th
- Most runs: RHFT: Cordelia Griffith (273); CEC: Cordelia Griffith (129)
- Most wickets: RHFT: Kelly Castle (10); CEC: Grace Scrivens (5)
- Most catches: RHFT: Naomi Dattani (5); CEC: Gayatri Gole (3), Naomi Dattani (3) & Katherine Speed (3)
- Most wicket-keeping dismissals: RHFT: Mia Rogers (3); CEC: Amara Carr (2)

The 2021 season was Sunrisers' second season, in which they competed in the 50 over Rachael Heyhoe Flint Trophy and the new Twenty20 competition, the Charlotte Edwards Cup. The side finished bottom of the Rachael Heyhoe Flint Trophy group stage, losing all seven of their matches. The side recorded their first ever win in their opening match of the Charlotte Edwards Cup, beating Western Storm, but did not win any further matches, finishing bottom of Group B.

The side was captained by Amara Carr in the Rachael Heyhoe Flint Trophy and Kelly Castle in the Charlotte Edwards Cup, and coached by Trevor Griffin. They played three home matches at the County Ground, Chelmsford, two at Fenner's and one apiece at the County Ground, Northampton and Merchant Taylors' School.

== Squad ==
Sunrisers announced their initial 18-player squad on 26 May 2021. Florence Miller was promoted to the senior squad from the Academy on 18 August 2021. Age given is at the start of Sunrisers' first match of the season (29 May 2021).

Name	Nationality	Birth date	Batting style	Bowling style	Notes
Batters
Cordelia Griffith	England	19 September 1995 (aged 25)	Right-handed	Right-arm medium	
Florence Miller	England	26 February 2004 (aged 17)	Right-handed	Right-arm medium	
Fran Wilson	England	7 November 1991 (aged 29)	Right-handed	Right-arm off break	
All-rounders
Kelly Castle	England	4 September 1997 (aged 23)	Right-handed	Right-arm medium	T20 captain
Kate Coppack	England	30 August 1994 (aged 26)	Right-handed	Right-arm medium	
Naomi Dattani	England	28 April 1994 (aged 27)	Left-handed	Left-arm medium	
Jo Gardner	England	25 March 1997 (aged 24)	Right-handed	Right-arm medium	
Alice Macleod	England	14 May 1994 (aged 27)	Right-handed	Right-arm off break	
Katie Midwood	England	1 October 1993 (aged 27)	Right-handed	Slow left-arm orthodox	
Grace Scrivens	England	10 November 2003 (aged 17)	Left-handed	Right-arm off break	
Katherine Speed	England	5 October 2001 (aged 19)	Right-handed	Right-arm medium	
Wicket-keepers
Amara Carr	England	17 April 1994 (aged 27)	Right-handed	—	50-over captain
Mia Rogers	England	29 January 2002 (aged 19)	Right-handed	—	
Bowlers
Gayatri Gole	England	22 July 1998 (aged 22)	Right-handed	Right-arm medium	
Sonali Patel	England	23 May 2003 (aged 18)	Right-handed	Right-arm medium	
Emily Thorpe	England	27 January 1999 (aged 22)	Right-handed	Right-arm leg break	
Mady Villiers	England	26 August 1998 (aged 22)	Right-handed	Right-arm off break	
Katie Wolfe	England	30 April 2001 (aged 20)	Right-handed	Right-arm medium	
Emily Woodhouse	England	13 October 1996 (aged 24)	Right-handed	Right-arm off break	

== Rachael Heyhoe Flint Trophy ==
=== Season standings ===
Pos	Team	Pld	W	L	T	NR	BP	Pts	NRR
1	Southern Vipers (Q)	7	6	1	0	0	3	27	0.417
2	Northern Diamonds (Q)	7	5	2	0	0	3	23	1.182
3	Central Sparks (Q)	7	5	2	0	0	2	22	0.822
4	Lightning	7	3	4	0	0	1	13	0.274
5	South East Stars	7	3	4	0	0	1	13	−0.226
6	Western Storm	7	3	4	0	0	1	13	−0.462
7	North West Thunder	7	3	4	0	0	1	13	−0.620
8	Sunrisers	7	0	7	0	0	0	0	−1.598

Source: ESPN Cricinfo

Advanced to the final
Advanced to the play-off

== Fixtures ==
29 May 2021
10:30 BST
Scorecard

South East Stars; 324/7 (50 overs)	v	Sunrisers; 189 (39.2 overs)
Sophia Dunkley 104* (93); Kelly Castle 3/40 (7.4 overs)		Naomi Dattani 47 (61); Tash Farrant 5/33 (8 overs)

South East Stars won by 135 runs
County Ground, Chelmsford
Umpires: Joanne Ibbotson and Sue Redfern

- Sunrisers won the toss and elected to field.
- Points: South East Stars 5, Sunrisers 0

31 May 2021
10:30 BST
Scorecard

North West Thunder; 247/9 (50 overs)	v	Sunrisers; 211 (45.2 overs)
Georgie Boyce 91 (117); Sonali Patel 4/40 (7 overs)		Fran Wilson 50 (45); Sophie Ecclestone 3/28 (9.2 overs)

North West Thunder won by 36 runs
Chester Boughton Hall Cricket Club, Chester
Umpires: Jasmine Naeem and Neil Pratt

- North West Thunder won the toss and elected to bat.
- Points: North West Thunder 4, Sunrisers 0

5 June 2021
10:30 BST
Scorecard

Sunrisers; 53 (29.1 overs)	v	Northern Diamonds; 54/1 (7.4 overs)
Amara Carr 17 (43); Jenny Gunn 3/10 (6 overs)		Hollie Armitage 14* (19); Kate Coppack 1/14 (3 overs)

Northern Diamonds won by 9 wickets
Fenner's, Cambridge
Umpires: Joanne Ibbotson and Sarah Bartlett

- Northern Diamonds won the toss and elected to field.
- Points: Northern Diamonds 5, Sunrisers 0

12 June 2021
10:30 BST
Scorecard

Sunrisers; 206/9 (50 overs)	v	Lightning; 210/5 (40.2 overs)
Naomi Dattani 65 (92); Teresa Graves 4/39 (10 overs)		Michaela Kirk 57 (66); Kelly Castle 2/24 (6 overs)

Lightning won by 5 wickets
Haslegrave Ground, Loughborough
Umpires: Hassan Adnan and Joanne Ibbotson

- Sunrisers won the toss and elected to bat.
- Points: Lightning 4, Sunrisers 0

10 September 2021
10:30 BST
Scorecard

Sunrisers; 204/7 (42 overs)	v	Central Sparks; 208/4 (37.2 overs)
Cordelia Griffith 69 (95); Ria Fackrell 3/30 (6 overs)		Marie Kelly 58 (63); Kelly Castle 1/22 (9 overs)

Central Sparks won by 6 wickets (DLS)
Merchant Taylors' School, Northwood
Umpires: Jasmine Naeem and Ian Ramage

- Central Sparks won the toss and elected to field.
- Central Sparks were set a revised target of 206 runs from 42 overs due to rain.
- Points: Central Sparks 4, Sunrisers 0

12 September 2021
10:30 BST
Scorecard

Southern Vipers; 309/9 (50 overs)	v	Sunrisers; 308/6 (50 overs)
Georgia Elwiss 112* (118); Sonali Patel 3/46 (10 overs)		Cordelia Griffith 91 (82); Georgia Adams 2/36 (6 overs)

Southern Vipers won by 1 run
County Ground, Chelmsford
Umpires: Sarah Bartlett and Sophie McLelland
Player of the match: Georgia Elwiss (Southern Vipers)

- Sunrisers won the toss and elected to field.
- Points: Southern Vipers 4, Sunrisers 0

18 September 2021
10:30 BST
Scorecard

Western Storm; 313/4 (50 overs)	v	Sunrisers; 277 (44.3 overs)
Sophie Luff 157* (142); Mady Villiers 2/39 (10 overs)		Cordelia Griffith 49 (42); Georgia Hennessy 2/45 (8 overs)

Western Storm won by 36 runs
County Ground, Bristol
Umpires: Yvonne Dolphin-Cooper and Tom Lungley

- Western Storm won the toss and elected to bat.
- Points: Western Storm 4, Sunrisers 0

=== Tournament statistics ===
==== Batting ====
Player	Matches	Innings	Runs	Average	High score	100s	50s
Cordelia Griffith	7	7	273	39.00	91	0	2
Alice Macleod	7	7	214	30.57	79	0	1
Fran Wilson	6	6	165	33.00	65*	0	2
Grace Scrivens	7	7	161	23.00	46	0	0
Naomi Dattani	7	7	143	20.42	65	0	1
Kelly Castle	7	7	106	17.66	52	0	1

Source: ESPN Cricinfo Qualification: 100 runs.

==== Bowling ====
Player	Matches	Overs	Wickets	Average	Economy	BBI	5wi
Kelly Castle	7	47.4	10	21.10	4.42	3/40	0
Sonali Patel	3	25.0	7	20.28	5.68	4/40	0
Mady Villiers	4	30.0	5	31.20	5.20	3/47	0

Source: ESPN Cricinfo Qualification: 5 wickets.

== Charlotte Edwards Cup ==
=== Group B ===
Pos	Team	Pld	W	L	T	NR	BP	Pts	NRR
1	Northern Diamonds (Q)	6	4	2	0	0	1	17	0.655
2	Western Storm	6	4	2	0	0	1	17	0.182
3	North West Thunder	6	2	3	1	0	1	11	0.029
4	Sunrisers	6	1	4	1	0	0	6	−0.871

Source: ESPN Cricinfo
- Advanced to the semi-final

=== Fixtures ===
26 June 2021
14:30 BST
Scorecard

Western Storm; 129/6 (20 overs)	v	Sunrisers; 133/3 (17.5 overs)
Nat Wraith 36* (24); Sonali Patel 2/26 (4 overs)		Mady Villiers 36 (26); Danielle Gibson 1/20 (3 overs)

Sunrisers won by 7 wickets
County Ground, Taunton
Umpires: Mark Newell and Yvonne Dolphin-Cooper

- Sunrisers won the toss and elected to field.
- Points: Sunrisers 4, Western Storm 0

2 July 2021
19:00 BST (D/N)
Scorecard

Sunrisers; 116/7 (20 overs)	v	Northern Diamonds; 117/2 (16.2 overs)
Jo Gardner 42 (30); Jenny Gunn 3/25 (4 overs)		Leah Dobson 44* (52); Mady Villiers 1/22 (3 overs)

Northern Diamonds won by 8 wickets
County Ground, Chelmsford
Umpires: Joanne Ibbotson and Sophie McLelland

- Northern Diamonds won the toss and elected to field.
- Points: Northern Diamonds 4, Sunrisers 0

9 July 2021
14:30 BST
Scorecard

North West Thunder; 186/1 (20 overs)	v	Sunrisers; 115 (20 overs)
Emma Lamb 111* (61); Gayatri Gole 1/37 (4 overs)		Cordelia Griffith 34 (33); Emma Lamb 3/16 (4 overs)

North West Thunder won by 71 runs
Old Trafford, Manchester
Umpires: Joanne Ibbotson and Neil Pratt

- Sunrisers won the toss and elected to field.
- Points: North West Thunder 5, Sunrisers 0

25 August 2021
14:30 BST
Scorecard

Northern Diamonds; 120/6 (20 overs)	v	Sunrisers; 101/7 (20 overs)
Beth Langston 40 (35); Kate Coppack 2/10 (4 overs)		Jo Gardner 31 (29); Alex MacDonald 2/11 (4 overs)

Northern Diamonds won by 19 runs
South Northumberland Cricket Club, Gosforth
Umpires: Paul Pollard and Jane Pratt

- Sunrisers won the toss and elected to field.
- Points: Northern Diamonds 4, Sunrisers 0

28 August 2021
14:30 BST
Scorecard

North West Thunder; 124/5 (20 overs)	v	Sunrisers; 124/4 (20 overs)
Georgie Boyce 31 (27); Emily Thorpe 2/17 (4 overs)		Cordelia Griffith 63 (51); Kate Cross 2/20 (4 overs)

Match tied
County Ground, Northampton
Umpires: Hassan Adnan and Sue Redfern

- North West Thunder won the toss and elected to bat.
- Points: North West Thunder 2, Sunrisers 2

30 August 2021
14:30 BST
Scorecard

Western Storm; 147/5 (20 overs)	v	Sunrisers; 142/7 (20 overs)
Georgia Hennessy 62 (62); Grace Scrivens 2/23 (4 overs)		Cordelia Griffith 32 (25); Nicole Harvey 3/17 (4 overs)

Western Storm won by 5 runs
Fenner's, Cambridge
Umpires: Sarah Bartlett and Martin Saggers

- Sunrisers won the toss and elected to field.
- Points: Western Storm 4, Sunrisers 0

=== Tournament statistics ===
==== Batting ====
Player	Matches	Innings	Runs	Average	High score	100s	50s
Cordelia Griffith	4	4	129	32.25	63	0	1
Grace Scrivens	6	6	92	18.40	34*	0	0
Jo Gardner	4	3	81	40.50	42	0	0
Naomi Dattani	6	6	69	11.50	22	0	0
Katherine Speed	6	4	60	30.00	26*	0	0
Alice Macleod	4	4	55	13.75	17	0	0
Amara Carr	3	3	54	27.00	25	0	0

Source: ESPN Cricinfo Qualification: 50 runs.

==== Bowling ====
Player	Matches	Overs	Wickets	Average	Economy	BBI	5wi
Grace Scrivens	6	23.0	5	24.00	5.21	2/23	0

Source: ESPN Cricinfo Qualification: 5 wickets.

== Season statistics ==
=== Batting ===
Player	Rachael Heyhoe Flint Trophy								Charlotte Edwards Cup							
Player	Matches	Innings	Runs	High score	Average	Strike rate	100s	50s	Matches	Innings	Runs	High score	Average	Strike rate	100s	50s
Amara Carr	5	5	41	17	8.20	50.61	0	0	3	3	54	25	27.00	110.20	0	0
Kelly Castle	7	7	106	52	17.66	65.83	0	1	6	5	25	15	6.25	69.44	0	0
Kate Coppack	5	3	11	6*	11.00	33.33	0	0	3	–	–	–	–	–	–	–
Naomi Dattani	7	7	143	65	20.42	69.41	0	1	6	6	69	22	11.50	85.18	0	0
Jo Gardner	7	7	58	22	9.66	78.37	0	0	4	3	81	42	40.50	112.50	0	0
Gayatri Gole	5	4	36	15	9.00	56.25	0	0	5	3	18	11*	18.00	105.88	0	0
Cordelia Griffith	7	7	273	91	39.00	82.22	0	2	4	4	129	63	32.25	117.27	0	1
Alice Macleod	7	7	214	79	30.57	74.30	0	1	4	4	55	17	13.75	93.22	0	0
Katie Midwood	1	1	10	10*	–	52.63	0	0	–	–	–	–	–	–	–	–
Florence Miller	–	–	–	–	–	–	–	–	3	3	19	9	6.33	63.33	0	0
Sonali Patel	3	2	6	5*	6.00	33.33	0	0	4	1	1	1*	–	33.33	0	0
Mia Rogers	2	2	11	8*	–	78.57	0	0	6	4	20	11*	10.00	60.60	0	0
Grace Scrivens	7	7	161	46	23.00	60.07	0	0	6	6	92	34*	18.40	76.66	0	0
Katherine Speed	2	2	3	2	1.50	25.00	0	0	6	4	60	26*	30.00	98.36	0	0
Emily Thorpe	2	–	–	–	–	–	–	–	1	–	–	–	–	–	–	–
Mady Villiers	4	4	72	37	18.00	94.73	0	0	2	2	46	36	23.00	135.29	0	0
Fran Wilson	6	6	165	65*	33.00	99.39	0	2	–	–	–	–	–	–	–	–
Katie Wolfe	–	–	–	–	–	–	–	–	1	–	–	–	–	–	–	–
Emily Woodhouse	–	–	–	–	–	–	–	–	2	1	3	3	3.00	42.85	0	0
Source: ESPN Cricinfo

=== Bowling ===
Player	Rachael Heyhoe Flint Trophy							Charlotte Edwards Cup						
Player	Matches	Overs	Wickets	Average	Economy	BBI	5wi	Matches	Overs	Wickets	Average	Economy	BBI	5wi
Kelly Castle	7	47.4	10	21.10	4.42	3/40	0	6	18.2	2	62.00	6.76	1/14	0
Kate Coppack	5	32.4	3	60.66	5.57	1/14	0	3	8.0	2	17.00	6.25	2/10	0
Naomi Dattani	7	35.5	3	75.00	6.27	2/20	0	6	15.0	3	40.66	8.13	2/24	0
Jo Gardner	7	21.3	1	163.00	7.58	1/35	0	4	10.0	1	73.00	7.30	1/14	0
Gayatri Gole	5	21.2	1	130.00	6.09	1/31	0	5	13.0	2	52.00	8.00	1/27	0
Alice Macleod	7	9.0	2	27.00	6.00	1/5	0	4	–	–	–	–	–	–
Katie Midwood	1	8.0	1	42.00	5.25	1/42	0	–	–	–	–	–	–	–
Sonali Patel	3	25.0	7	20.28	5.68	4/40	0	4	13.0	3	38.00	8.76	2/26	0
Grace Scrivens	7	44.0	4	59.75	5.43	1/31	0	6	23.0	5	24.00	5.21	2/23	0
Emily Thorpe	2	10.2	0	–	7.93	–	0	1	4.0	2	8.50	4.25	2/17	0
Mady Villiers	4	30.0	5	31.20	5.20	3/47	0	2	7.0	1	50.00	7.14	1/22	0
Katie Wolfe	–	–	–	–	–	–	–	1	3.0	1	23.00	7.66	1/23	0
Emily Woodhouse	–	–	–	–	–	–	–	2	2.0	0	–	11.50	–	0
Source: ESPN Cricinfo

=== Fielding ===
Player	Rachael Heyhoe Flint Trophy			Charlotte Edwards Cup		
Player	Matches	Innings	Catches	Matches	Innings	Catches
Kelly Castle	7	7	1	6	6	0
Kate Coppack	5	5	0	3	3	0
Naomi Dattani	7	7	5	6	6	3
Jo Gardner	7	7	1	4	4	1
Gayatri Gole	5	5	0	5	5	3
Cordelia Griffith	7	7	3	4	4	2
Alice Macleod	7	7	2	4	4	0
Katie Midwood	1	1	0	–	–	–
Florence Miller	–	–	–	3	3	0
Sonali Patel	3	3	2	4	4	1
Mia Rogers	2	–	–	6	3	1
Grace Scrivens	7	7	2	6	6	0
Katherine Speed	2	2	0	6	6	3
Emily Thorpe	2	2	1	1	1	0
Mady Villiers	4	4	0	2	2	0
Fran Wilson	6	6	3	–	–	–
Katie Wolfe	–	–	–	1	1	1
Emily Woodhouse	–	–	–	2	2	0
Source: ESPN Cricinfo

=== Wicket-keeping ===
Player	Rachael Heyhoe Flint Trophy				Charlotte Edwards Cup			
Player	Matches	Innings	Catches	Stumpings	Matches	Innings	Catches	Stumpings
Amara Carr	5	5	1	1	3	3	0	2
Mia Rogers	2	2	2	1	6	2	1	0
Source: ESPN Cricinfo
