= List of Sunrisers women's cricketers =

This is an alphabetical list of cricketers who played for Sunrisers during their existence between 2020 and 2024. They first played in the Rachael Heyhoe Flint Trophy, a 50 over competition that began in 2020. In 2021, the Twenty20 Charlotte Edwards Cup was added to the women's domestic structure in England. At the end of the 2024 season, Sunrisers were effectively replaced by a professionalised Essex team.

Players' names are followed by the years in which they were active as a Sunrisers player. Seasons given are first and last seasons; the player did not necessarily play in all the intervening seasons. This list only includes players who appeared in at least one match for Sunrisers; players who were named in the team's squad for a season but did not play a match are not included.

== B ==
- Hayley Brown (2020)

== C ==
- Amara Carr (2020–2024)
- Kelly Castle (2020–2023)
- Kate Coppack (2021–2024)

== D ==
- Naomi Dattani (2020–2022)
- Ariana Dowse (2023–2024)

== G ==
- Jo Gardner (2020–2024)
- Gayatri Gole (2020–2022)
- Eva Gray (2023–2024)
- Jodi Grewcock (2022–2024)
- Cordelia Griffith (2020–2024)

== H ==
- Nicola Hancock (2024)
- Saskia Horley (2023)
- Scarlett Hughes (2022)

== M ==
- Esmae MacGregor (2023–2024)
- Alice Macleod (2020–2024)
- Abtaha Maqsood (2022–2024)
- Katie Midwood (2020–2021)
- Florence Miller (2021–2024)
- Sophie Munro (2024)

== O ==
- Jessica Olorenshaw (2022)

== P ==
- Sonali Patel (2020–2022)

== R ==
- Mia Rogers (2020–2022)

== S ==
- Grace Scrivens (2020–2024)
- Katherine Speed (2021–2022)
- Amuruthaa Surenkumar (2023–2024)

== T ==
- Emily Thorpe (2020–2021)

== V ==
- Dane van Niekerk (2023)
- Mady Villiers (2020–2024)

== W ==
- Fran Wilson (2020–2021)
- Katie Wolfe (2020–2021)
- Emily Woodhouse (2021)

== Captains ==
No.	Name	Nationality	Years	First	Last	LA	T20	Total
1	Amara Carr	England	2020–2021	29 August 2020	12 June 2021	10	0	10
2	Kelly Castle	England	2021–2023	26 June 2021	31 May 2023	13	18	31
3	Naomi Dattani	England	2022	11 September 2022	11 September 2022	1	0	1
4	Dane van Niekerk	South Africa	2023	7 June 2023	24 July 2023	3	1	4
5	Grace Scrivens	England	2023–2024	5 September 2023	21 September 2024	20	10	30
