= 2023 Sunrisers (women's cricket) season =

English cricket season

Sunrisers
2023 season
- Coach: Andy Tennant
- Captain: Kelly Castle (April–June); Dane van Niekerk (June–July); Grace Scrivens (September)
- Overseas player: (Scotland) Saskia Horley (Note: Horley qualified as an overseas player as she was born and raised in Australia.) (South Africa) Dane van Niekerk
- RHFT: 4th
- CEC: 8th
- Most runs: RHFT: Grace Scrivens (398); CEC: Cordelia Griffith (205)
- Most wickets: RHFT: Jodi Grewcock (14) & Eva Gray (14); CEC: Mady Villiers (10)
- Most catches: RHFT: Eva Gray (7); CEC: Jo Gardner (3), Abtaha Maqsood (3) & Florence Miller (3)
- Most wicket-keeping dismissals: RHFT: Amara Carr (8); CEC: Amara Carr (6)

The 2023 season was Sunrisers' fourth season, in which competed in the 50 over Rachael Heyhoe Flint Trophy and the Twenty20 Charlotte Edwards Cup. In the Charlotte Edwards Cup, the side finished bottom of the group, losing all of their seven matches. In the Rachael Heyhoe Flint Trophy, the side finished fourth, winning six of their fourteen matches, their first wins in the history of the competition.

Sunrisers had three club captains throughout the season: from April to June, the side was captained by Kelly Castle, until she was replaced by Dane van Niekerk. When van Niekerk's overseas stint with the side ended, Grace Scrivens took over the captaincy for the side's fixtures in September. The side was coached by Andy Tennant for his first year in the role, having taken over from interim head coach Laura Marsh. They played five home matches at the County Ground, Chelmsford, two apiece at the County Ground, Northampton and Brunton Memorial Ground, and one at Lord's.

== Squad ==
=== Departures ===
On 4 November 2022, it was announced that Naomi Dattani had left the side, joining North West Thunder. Ahead of the 2023 season, it was confirmed that Gayatri Gole and Sonali Patel had left the side.

=== Arrivals ===
On 4 November 2022, it was announced that Sunrisers had signed Eva Gray from South East Stars. On 22 March 2023, it was announced that Sunrisers had signed Saskia Horley as an overseas player for the first five rounds of the Rachael Heyhoe Flint Trophy. On 24 March 2023, it was announced that Sunrisers had signed Dane van Niekerk as an overseas player, to play for the side between the start of the Charlotte Edwards Cup and the end of July. On 6 June 2023, it was announced that Esmae MacGregor had been promoted from the academy to the senior squad. On 1 July 2023, it was announced that Amuruthaa Surenkumar had signed her first senior contract with the side. On 4 September 2023, the side announced the signing of Ariana Dowse.

=== Personnel and contract changes ===
On 28 September 2022, it was announced that Andy Tennant had been appointed as the head coach of the side, replacing Laura Marsh, who had coached on an interim basis for much of the previous season. On 4 November 2022, it was announced that Abtaha Maqsood had been signed on a professional contract, having previously been signed on a half-season deal in 2022. On 2 February 2023, Sunrisers announced a further two players who had been awarded professional contracts with the side, with Jodi Grewcock and Florence Miller both signing their first such contracts. On 7 June 2023, it was announced that Kelly Castle had stepped down as captain of the side, being replaced by Dane van Niekerk. On 4 September 2023, it was announced that Grace Scrivens was taking over the captaincy of the side, following the end of van Niekerk's stint as an overseas player.

=== Squad list ===
- Age given is at the start of Sunrisers' first match of the season (22 April 2023).

Name	Nationality	Birth date	Batting style	Bowling style	Notes
Batters
Cordelia Griffith	England	19 September 1995 (aged 27)	Right-handed	Right-arm medium	
Florence Miller	England	26 February 2004 (aged 19)	Right-handed	Right-arm medium	
All-rounders
Kelly Castle	England	4 September 1997 (aged 25)	Right-handed	Right-arm medium	Captain (April to June)
Kate Coppack	England	30 August 1994 (aged 28)	Right-handed	Right-arm medium	
Jo Gardner	England	25 March 1997 (aged 26)	Right-handed	Right-arm off break	
Jodi Grewcock	England	30 November 2004 (aged 18)	Left-handed	Right-arm leg break	
Saskia Horley	Scotland	23 February 2000 (aged 23)	Right-handed	Right-arm off break	Overseas player; April to May 2023
Alice Macleod	England	14 May 1994 (aged 28)	Right-handed	Right-arm off break	
Grace Scrivens	England	10 November 2003 (aged 19)	Left-handed	Right-arm off break	Captain (September)
Katherine Speed	England	5 October 2001 (aged 21)	Right-handed	Right-arm medium	
Amuruthaa Surenkumar	England	24 October 2006 (aged 16)	Right-handed	Right-arm medium	Joined July 2023
Dane van Niekerk	South Africa	14 May 1993 (aged 29)	Right-handed	Right-arm leg break	Overseas player; May to July 2023; captain (June to July)
Wicket-keepers
Amara Carr	England	17 April 1994 (aged 29)	Right-handed	—	
Ariana Dowse	England	8 February 2001 (aged 22)	Right-handed	—	Joined September 2023
Scarlett Hughes	England	18 June 2002 (aged 20)	Right-handed	—	
Jessica Olorenshaw	England	27 January 2005 (aged 18)	Right-handed	Right-arm medium	
Mia Rogers	England	29 January 2002 (aged 21)	Right-handed	—	
Bowlers
Eva Gray	England	24 May 2000 (aged 22)	Right-handed	Right-arm medium	
Esmae MacGregor	England	31 July 2004 (aged 18)	Right-handed	Right-arm medium	Joined June 2023
Abtaha Maqsood	Scotland	11 June 1999 (aged 23)	Right-handed	Right-arm leg break	
Mady Villiers	England	26 August 1998 (aged 24)	Right-handed	Right-arm off break	

== Rachael Heyhoe Flint Trophy ==
=== Season standings ===
Pos	Team	Pld	W	L	T	NR	BP	Pts	NRR
1	Southern Vipers (Q)	14	7	4	1	2	4	38	0.457
2	The Blaze (Q)	14	7	4	0	3	4	38	0.173
3	South East Stars (Q)	14	7	6	0	1	6	36	0.583
4	Sunrisers	14	6	5	0	3	2	32	−0.006
5	Central Sparks	14	6	5	1	2	1	31	−0.233
6	Northern Diamonds	14	6	7	0	1	4	30	−0.034
7	North West Thunder	14	3	5	2	4	2	26	−0.274
8	Western Storm	14	2	8	0	4	0	16	−1.068

Source: England and Wales Cricket Board

advanced to the final advanced to the play-off

=== Fixtures ===
22 April 2023
10:30
Scorecard

Sunrisers; 288/7 (50 overs)	v	Southern Vipers; 162 (35.2 overs)
Mady Villiers 70 (53); Linsey Smith 3/50 (10 overs)		Maia Bouchier 57 (48); Abtaha Maqsood 5/30 (9.2 overs)

Sunrisers won by 126 runs
Rose Bowl, Southampton
Umpires: Billy Taylor and Sophie McLelland

- Sunrisers won the toss and elected to bat.
- Points: Sunrisers 5, Southern Vipers 0

29 April 2023
10:30
Scorecard

Sunrisers; 159 (46 overs)	v	The Blaze; 160/7 (35.2 overs)
Cordelia Griffith 43 (65); Sarah Glenn 4/22 (10 overs)		Tammy Beaumont 64 (75); Kate Coppack 3/24 (6 overs)

The Blaze won by 3 wickets
County Ground, Chelmsford
Umpires: Sarah Bartlett and Anthony Harris

- Sunrisers won the toss and elected to bat.
- Points: The Blaze 5, Sunrisers 0

1 May 2023
10:30
Scorecard

Sunrisers; 157 (46 overs)	v	Northern Diamonds; 160/5 (28.3 overs)
Jodi Grewcock 50 (93); Katie Levick 3/23 (8 overs)		Lauren Winfield-Hill 51 (43); Mady Villiers 3/42 (10 overs)

Northern Diamonds won by 5 wickets
County Ground, Chelmsford
Umpires: Joanne Ibbotson and Rob White

- Sunrisers won the toss and elected to bat.
- Points: Northern Diamonds 5, Sunrisers 0

5 May 2023
10:30
Scorecard

South East Stars; 151/9 (29 overs)	v	Sunrisers; 64 (17 overs)
Kira Chathli 28 (39); Abtaha Maqsood 4/23 (6 overs)		Cordelia Griffith 27 (29); Danielle Gregory 4/12 (5 overs)

South East Stars won by 91 runs (DLS method)
Brunton Memorial Ground, Radlett
Umpires: Sophie McLelland and Tom Lungley

- Sunrisers won the toss and elected to field.
- Match reduced to 29 overs per side due to rain.
- Sunrisers were given a revised target of 156 runs off 29 overs.
- Points: South East Stars 5, Sunrisers 0

10 May 2023
10:30
Scorecard

North West Thunder; 60/2 (15 overs)	v	Sunrisers
Emma Lamb 38* (48); Eva Gray 2/23 (7 overs)

No result
Rookwood Cricket Ground, Sale
Umpires: Grace Bambury and Steve O'Shaughnessy

- Sunrisers won the toss and elected to field.
- Match reduced to 34 overs per side due to rain.
- No further play was possible due to rain.
- Points: North West Thunder 2, Sunrisers 2

2 July 2023
10:30
Scorecard

Sunrisers; 254 (49.2 overs)	v	Southern Vipers; 226 (46.3 overs)
Jodi Grewcock 76 (101); Georgia Elwiss 3/37 (10 overs)		Emily Windsor 84 (107); Jodi Grewcock 4/45 (10 overs)

Sunrisers won by 28 runs
County Ground, Chelmsford
Umpires: Amy Clark and Neil Bainton

- Sunrisers won the toss and elected to bat.
- Points: Sunrisers 4, Southern Vipers 0

11 July 2023
10:30
Scorecard

South East Stars; 290/9 (50 overs)	v	Sunrisers; 262/7 (48 overs)
Tazmin Brits 112* (72); Jodi Grewcock 3/51 (10 overs)		Cordelia Griffith 92 (113); Danielle Gregory 4/26 (5 overs)

South East Stars won by 19 runs (DLS method)
County Ground, Beckenham
Umpires: Fiona Richards and Simon Widdup

- South East Stars won the toss and elected to bat.
- Sunrisers innings reduced to 48 overs due to rain; target was 282.
- Points: South East Stars 4, Sunrisers 0

14 July 2023
10:30
Scorecard

Sunrisers	v	North West Thunder

Match abandoned
County Ground, Northampton

- No toss.
- No play was possible due to rain.
- Points: Sunrisers 2, North West Thunder 2

22 July 2023
10:30
Scorecard

Central Sparks	v	Sunrisers

Match abandoned
New Road, Worcester

- No toss.
- No play was possible due to rain.
- Points: Central Sparks 2, Sunrisers 2

24 July 2023
10:30
Scorecard

Western Storm; 165/3 (22 overs)	v	Sunrisers; 159/8 (22 overs)
Fran Wilson 56 (52); Amuruthaa Surenkumar 2/37 (5 overs)		Grace Scrivens 39 (45); Sophia Smale 4/34 (4 overs)

Western Storm won by 6 runs
College Ground, Cheltenham
Umpires: Anthony Harris and Joanne Ibbotson

- Sunrisers won the toss and elected to field.
- Match reduced to 22 overs per side due to rain.
- Points: Western Storm 4, Sunrisers 0

5 September 2023
10:30
Scorecard

Western Storm; 143 (45.1 overs)	v	Sunrisers; 144/6 (33.5 overs)
Emma Corney 34 (82); Jodi Grewcock 3/24 (7.1 overs)		Mady Villiers 29 (24); Mollie Robbins 2/23 (6 overs)

Sunrisers won by 4 wickets
Brunton Memorial Ground, Radlett
Umpires: Gabi Brown and Nigel Llong

- Western Storm won the toss and elected to bat.
- Points: Sunrisers 5, Western Storm 0

10 September 2023
10:30
Scorecard

Central Sparks; 227/8 (50 overs)	v	Sunrisers; 228/6 (45 overs)
Abigail Freeborn 107* (140); Jo Gardner 2/21 (5 overs)		Amara Carr 58 (79); Emily Arlott 2/33 (10 overs)

Sunrisers won by 4 wickets
County Ground, Chelmsford
Umpires: Anthony Harris and James Tredwell

- Central Sparks won the toss and elected to bat.
- Points: Sunrisers 4, Central Sparks 0

13 September 2023
10:30
Scorecard

Sunrisers; 295/5 (50 overs)	v	The Blaze; 265 (48.1 overs)
Grace Scrivens 107 (136); Teresa Graves 2/25 (6 overs)		Georgie Boyce 104 (126); Eva Gray 4/31 (10 overs)

Sunrisers won by 30 runs
Haslegrave Ground, Loughborough
Umpires: Anthony Harris and Hassan Adnan

- The Blaze won the toss and elected to field.
- Points: Sunrisers 4, The Blaze 0

16 September 2023
10:30
Scorecard

Northern Diamonds; 114/6 (18 overs)	v	Sunrisers; 126/4 (17.3 overs)
Bess Heath 37 (21); Eva Gray 2/24 (5 overs)		Jo Gardner 30* (21); Grace Hall 2/36 (4 overs)

Sunrisers won by 6 wickets (DLS method)
Riverside Ground, Chester-le-Street
Umpires: Gabi Brown and Hassan Adnan

- Sunrisers won the toss and elected to field.
- Match reduced to 18 overs per side due to rain; Sunrisers target was 126.
- Points: Sunrisers 4, Northern Diamonds 0

=== Tournament statistics ===
==== Batting ====
Player	Matches	Innings	Runs	Average	High score	100s	50s
Grace Scrivens	11	10	398	39.80	107	1	3
Jodi Grewcock	11	8	230	28.75	76	0	3
Amara Carr	12	11	216	27.00	58	0	1
Mady Villiers	12	11	211	19.18	70	0	2

Source: ESPN Cricinfo Qualification: 200 runs.

==== Bowling ====
Player	Matches	Overs	Wickets	Average	Economy	BBI	5wi
Jodi Grewcock	11	49.1	14	16.28	4.63	4/45	0
Eva Gray	10	64.3	14	19.07	4.13	4/31	0
Kate Coppack	12	63.0	12	28.41	5.41	3/24	0
Mady Villiers	12	72.2	12	33.66	5.58	3/42	0

Source: ESPN Cricinfo Qualification: 10 wickets.

== Charlotte Edwards Cup ==
=== Season standings ===
Pos	Team	Pld	W	L	T	NR	BP	Pts	NRR
1	The Blaze (Q)	7	7	0	0	0	4	32	1.765
2	Southern Vipers (Q)	7	5	2	0	0	2	22	0.940
3	North West Thunder (Q)	7	4	3	0	0	2	18	0.331
4	Northern Diamonds	7	4	3	0	0	1	17	−0.129
5	South East Stars	7	3	4	0	0	0	12	−0.096
6	Western Storm	7	3	4	0	0	0	12	−0.512
7	Central Sparks	7	2	5	0	0	0	8	−0.558
8	Sunrisers	7	0	7	0	0	0	0	−1.717

Source: England and Wales Cricket Board

advanced to final advanced to the semi-final

=== Fixtures ===
18 May 2023
18:30 BST (D/N)
Scorecard

Central Sparks; 137 (19.5 overs)	v	Sunrisers; 114 (19 overs)
Amy Jones 51 (34); Kelly Castle 3/24 (4 overs)		Cordelia Griffith 53 (46); Emily Arlott 4/23 (4 overs)

Central Sparks won by 23 runs
County Ground, Chelmsford
Umpires: Billy Taylor and Sue Redfern

- Sunrisers won the toss and elected to field.
- Points: Central Sparks 4, Sunrisers 0

25 May 2023
14:15 BST
Scorecard

Sunrisers; 132/8 (20 overs)	v	South East Stars; 135/6 (19 overs)
Eva Gray 34* (24); Paige Scholfield 3/24 (4 overs)		Bryony Smith 38 (27); Grace Scrivens 2/22 (4 overs)

South East Stars won by 4 wickets
Lord's, London
Umpires: Rose Dovey and Surendiran Shanmugam

- Sunrisers won the toss and elected to bat.
- Points: South East Stars 4, Sunrisers 0

27 May 2023
14:30 BST
Scorecard

Sunrisers; 116/8 (20 overs)	v	North West Thunder; 119/3 (16.3 overs)
Cordelia Griffith 36 (35); Kate Cross 2/20 (4 overs)		Liberty Heap 46 (49); Mady Villiers 1/12 (2 overs)

North West Thunder won by 7 wickets
Old Trafford Cricket Ground, Manchester
Umpires: Anthony Harris and Naeem Ashraf

- Sunrisers won the toss and elected to bat.
- Points: North West Thunder 4, Sunrisers 0

28 May 2023
15:30 BST
Scorecard

Northern Diamonds; 172/7 (20 overs)	v	Sunrisers; 137 (18.4 overs)
Leah Dobson 47 (40); Grace Scrivens 2/24 (4 overs)		Grace Scrivens 50 (35); Katie Levick 5/19 (4 overs)

Northern Diamonds won by 35 runs
Headingley Cricket Ground, Leeds
Umpires: Phil Mustard and Simon Widdup

- Northern Diamonds won the toss and elected to bat.
- Points: Northern Diamonds 5, Sunrisers 0

31 May 2023
14:30 BST
Scorecard

Sunrisers; 149/6 (20 overs)	v	Western Storm; 150/3 (18.2 overs)
Jo Gardner 37* (29); Chloe Skelton 2/19 (4 overs)		Danielle Gibson 62 (46); Mady Villiers 1/20 (4 over)

Western Storm won by 7 wickets
County Ground, Northampton
Umpires: Anthony Harris and Sue Redfern

- Western Storm won the toss and elected to field.
- Points: Western Storm 4, Sunrisers 0

4 June 2023
11:00 BST
Scorecard

The Blaze; 198/6 (20 overs)	v	Sunrisers; 114 (20 overs)
Nat Sciver-Brunt 58 (30); Eva Gray 2/29 (3 overs)		Grace Scrivens 20 (26); Sarah Glenn 2/9 (3 overs)

The Blaze won by 84 runs
Trent Bridge, Nottingham
Umpires: Anthony Harris and James Tredwell

- The Blaze won the toss and elected to bat.
- Points: The Blaze 5, Sunrisers 0

7 June 2023
19:00 BST (D/N)
Scorecard

Sunrisers; 114/7 (20 overs)	v	Southern Vipers; 115/5 (14.5 overs)
Cordelia Griffith 65 (56); Linsey Smith 3/13 (4 overs)		Georgia Adams 63* (33); Mady Villiers 3/15 (4 overs)

Southern Vipers won by 5 wickets
County Ground, Hove
Umpires: Rose Dovey and Surendiran Shanmugam

- Southern Vipers won the toss and elected to field.
- Points: Southern Vipers 5, Sunrisers 0

=== Tournament statistics ===
==== Batting ====
Player	Matches	Innings	Runs	Average	High score	100s	50s
Cordelia Griffith	6	6	205	34.16	65	0	2

Source: ESPN Cricinfo Qualification: 100 runs.

==== Bowling ====
Player	Matches	Overs	Wickets	Average	Economy	BBI	5wi
Mady Villiers	7	25.0	10	15.90	6.36	3/15	0
Kelly Castle	7	22.0	7	25.42	8.09	3/24	0
Grace Scrivens	6	15.1	5	25.42	7.05	2/22	0

Source: ESPN Cricinfo Qualification: 5 wickets.

== Season statistics ==
=== Batting ===
Player	Rachael Heyhoe Flint Trophy								Charlotte Edwards Cup							
Player	Matches	Innings	Runs	High score	Average	Strike rate	100s	50s	Matches	Innings	Runs	High score	Average	Strike rate	100s	50s
Amara Carr	12	11	216	58	27.00	78.54	0	1	7	7	43	12	6.14	74.13	0	0
Kelly Castle	11	5	12	9	3.00	38.70	0	0	7	6	30	10	7.50	65.21	0	0
Kate Coppack	12	5	53	16*	–	79.10	0	0	5	4	24	19	24.00	109.09	0	0
Ariana Dowse	4	4	161	105	40.25	92.00	1	0	–	–	–	–	–	–	–	–
Jo Gardner	9	8	130	32	26.00	67.35	0	0	6	6	92	37*	18.40	108.23	0	0
Eva Gray	10	7	64	27	9.14	106.66	0	0	7	6	66	34*	16.50	129.41	0	0
Jodi Grewcock	11	8	230	76	28.75	58.97	0	3	–	–	–	–	–	–	–	–
Cordelia Griffith	8	6	195	92	32.50	76.77	0	1	6	6	205	65	34.16	107.32	0	2
Saskia Horley	5	4	49	27	12.25	67.12	0	0	–	–	–	–	–	–	–	–
Esmae MacGregor	2	1	2	2	2.00	50.00	0	0	1	–	–	–	–	–	–	–
Alice Macleod	3	3	28	22	9.33	62.22	0	0	5	5	88	34	17.60	122.22	0	0
Abtaha Maqsood	6	3	14	14	4.66	50.00	0	0	7	3	3	2	1.50	37.50	0	0
Florence Miller	6	6	73	20*	18.25	112.30	0	0	7	6	59	20	9.83	76.62	0	0
Grace Scrivens	11	10	398	107	39.80	69.33	1	3	6	6	97	50	16.16	97.00	0	1
Amuruthaa Surenkumar	7	5	49	25	24.50	89.09	0	0	–	–	–	–	–	–	–	–
Dane van Niekerk	3	3	78	44	26.00	118.18	0	0	6	6	66	20	11.00	101.53	0	0
Mady Villiers	12	11	211	70	19.18	104.97	0	2	7	7	55	16	7.85	100.00	0	0
Source: ESPN Cricinfo

=== Bowling ===
Player	Rachael Heyhoe Flint Trophy							Charlotte Edwards Cup						
Player	Matches	Overs	Wickets	Average	Economy	BBI	5wi	Matches	Overs	Wickets	Average	Economy	BBI	5wi
Kelly Castle	11	46.0	8	25.87	4.50	2/30	0	7	22.0	7	25.42	8.09	3/24	0
Kate Coppack	12	63.0	12	28.41	5.41	3/24	0	5	11.0	3	32.33	8.81	2/42	0
Jo Gardner	9	9.0	3	12.66	4.22	2/21	0	6	11.0	2	49.00	8.90	1/11	0
Eva Gray	10	64.3	14	19.07	4.13	4/31	0	7	21.0	4	39.25	7.47	2/29	0
Jodi Grewcock	11	49.1	14	16.28	4.63	4/45	0	–	–	–	–	–	–	–
Esmae MacGregor	2	14.0	1	76.00	5.42	1/35	0	1	2.5	2	11.50	8.11	2/23	0
Abtaha Maqsood	6	21.2	9	11.44	4.82	5/30	1	7	20.3	4	46.50	9.07	2/33	0
Grace Scrivens	11	58.1	5	49.60	4.26	1/15	0	6	15.1	5	21.40	7.05	2/22	0
Amuruthaa Surenkumar	7	23.3	5	29.40	6.25	2/37	0	–	–	–	–	–	–	–
Dane van Niekerk	3	2.0	1	17.00	8.50	1/17	0	6	–	–	–	–	–	–
Mady Villiers	12	72.2	12	33.66	5.58	3/42	0	7	25.0	10	15.90	6.36	3/15	0
Source: ESPN Cricinfo

=== Fielding ===
Player	Rachael Heyhoe Flint Trophy			Charlotte Edwards Cup		
Player	Matches	Innings	Catches	Matches	Innings	Catches
Kelly Castle	11	11	5	7	7	2
Kate Coppack	12	12	4	5	5	1
Ariana Dowse	4	4	0	–	–	–
Jo Gardner	9	9	3	6	6	3
Eva Gray	10	10	7	7	7	2
Jodi Grewcock	11	11	6	–	–	–
Cordelia Griffith	8	8	0	6	6	0
Saskia Horley	5	5	0	–	–	–
Esmae MacGregor	2	2	1	1	1	0
Alice Macleod	3	3	0	5	5	0
Abtaha Maqsood	6	6	0	7	7	3
Florence Miller	6	6	3	7	7	3
Grace Scrivens	11	11	6	6	6	1
Amuruthaa Surenkumar	7	7	1	–	–	–
Dane van Niekerk	3	3	3	6	6	0
Mady Villiers	12	12	3	7	7	1
Source: ESPN Cricinfo

=== Wicket-keeping ===
Player	Rachael Heyhoe Flint Trophy				Charlotte Edwards Cup			
Player	Matches	Innings	Catches	Stumpings	Matches	Innings	Catches	Stumpings
Amara Carr	12	12	4	4	7	7	1	5
Source: ESPN Cricinfo
