= 2020 Sunrisers (women's cricket) season =

Sunrisers
2020 season
- Coach: Trevor Griffin
- Captain: Amara Carr
- RHFT: South Group, 4th
- Most runs: Jo Gardner (193)
- Most wickets: Sonali Patel (7); Jo Gardner (7); Katie Wolfe (7)
- Most catches: Naomi Dattani (3)
- Most wicket-keeping dismissals: Amara Carr (4)

The 2020 season was Sunrisers' first season, in which they competed in the 50 over Rachael Heyhoe Flint Trophy following reforms to the structure of women's domestic cricket in England. The side finished bottom of the North Group of the competition, losing all six of their matches.

After the ending of the Women's Cricket Super League in 2019, the ECB announced the beginning of a new "women's elite domestic structure". Eight teams were included in this new structure, with Sunrisers being one of the new teams, representing the London and the East of England. Due to the impact of the COVID-19 pandemic, only the Rachael Heyhoe Flint Trophy was able to take place. Sunrisers were captained by Amara Carr and coached by Trevor Griffin, and played their home matches at the County Ground, Chelmsford.

== Squad ==
Sunrisers' squad is listed below. Age given is at the start of Sunrisers' first match of the season (29 August 2020).

Name	Nationality	Birth date	Batting Style	Bowling Style	Notes
Batters
Hayley Brown	England	25 March 1998 (aged 22)	Right-handed	Right-arm leg break	
Cordelia Griffith	England	19 September 1995 (aged 24)	Right-handed	Right-arm medium	
Fran Wilson	England	7 November 1991 (aged 28)	Right-handed	Right-arm off break	
All-rounders
Kelly Castle	England	4 September 1997 (aged 22)	Right-handed	Right-arm medium	
Naomi Dattani	England	28 April 1994 (aged 26)	Left-handed	Left-arm medium	
Jo Gardner	England	25 March 1997 (aged 23)	Right-handed	Right-arm medium	
Alice Macleod	England	14 May 1994 (aged 26)	Right-handed	Right-arm off break	
Katie Midwood	England	1 October 1993 (aged 26)	Right-handed	Slow left-arm orthodox	
Grace Scrivens	England	10 November 2003 (aged 16)	Left-handed	Right-arm off break	
Wicket-keepers
Amara Carr	England	17 April 1994 (aged 26)	Right-handed	—	Captain
Scarlett Hughes	England	18 June 2002 (aged 18)	Left-handed	—	
Mia Rogers	England	29 January 2002 (aged 18)	Right-handed	—	
Bowlers
Gayatri Gole	England	22 July 1998 (aged 22)	Right-handed	Right-arm medium	
Sonali Patel	England	23 May 2003 (aged 17)	Right-handed	Right-arm medium	
Emily Thorpe	England	27 January 1999 (aged 21)	Right-handed	Right-arm leg break	
Mady Villiers	England	26 August 1998 (aged 22)	Right-handed	Right-arm off break	
Katie Wolfe	England	30 April 2001 (aged 19)	Right-handed	Right-arm medium	

== Rachael Heyhoe Flint Trophy ==
=== South Group ===
Pos	Team	Pld	W	L	T	NR	BP	Pts	NRR
1	Southern Vipers	6	6	0	0	0	3	27	1.017
2	Western Storm	6	4	2	0	0	2	18	0.510
3	South East Stars	6	2	4	0	0	2	10	−0.197
4	Sunrisers	6	0	6	0	0	0	0	−1.365

Source: ESPN Cricinfo

Advanced to the Final.

=== Fixtures ===
29 August 2020
10:30 BST
Scorecard

Sunrisers; 202 (46.1 overs)	v	Southern Vipers; 208/3 (36.2 overs)
Mady Villiers 64 (83); Paige Scholfield 3/33 (9.1 overs)		Danni Wyatt 66 (73); Alice Macleod 1/14 (3 overs)

Southern Vipers won by 7 wickets
County Ground, Chelmsford
Umpires: Chris Watts and Anna Harris

- Southern Vipers won the toss and elected to field.
- Points: Southern Vipers 5, Sunrisers 0

31 August 2020
10:30 BST
Scorecard

South East Stars; 289/8 (50 overs)	v	Sunrisers; 212 (45.5 overs)
Sophia Dunkley 97 (116); Sonali Patel 4/52 (10 overs)		Amara Carr 99 (113); Bryony Smith 3/25 (5.5 overs)

South East Stars won by 77 runs
County Ground, Beckenham
Umpires: Sophie McLelland and Nigel Llong

- South East Stars won the toss and elected to bat.
- Points: South East Stars 5, Sunrisers 0

5 September 2020
10:30 BST
Scorecard

Western Storm; 265/6 (50 overs)	v	Sunrisers; 179 (45 overs)
Sophie Luff 85 (115); Alice Macleod 1/34 (10 overs)		Jo Gardner 54 (76); Fi Morris 5/26 (10 overs)

Western Storm won by 86 runs
County Ground, Chelmsford
Umpires: Nigel Llong and Nigel Cowley

- Sunrisers won the toss and elected to field.
- Points: Western Storm 5, Sunrisers 0

11 September 2020
10:30 BST
Scorecard

Southern Vipers; 232 (49.5 overs)	v	Sunrisers; 183 (43.5 overs)
Georgia Adams 89 (108); Katie Midwood 2/33 (10 overs)		Alice Macleod 35 (45); Tara Norris 3/37 (7 overs)

Southern Vipers won by 49 runs
Rose Bowl, Southampton
Umpires: Billy Taylor and Sophie McLelland

- Southern Vipers won the toss and elected to bat.
- Points: Southern Vipers 5, Sunrisers 0

13 September 2020
10:30 BST
Scorecard

Sunrisers; 198 (48.4 overs)	v	South East Stars; 199/4 (37.1 overs)
Naomi Dattani 33 (41); Tash Farrant 3/24 (9.4 overs)		Alice Capsey 73* (75); Jo Gardner 2/13 (4 overs)

South East Stars won by 6 wickets
County Ground, Chelmsford
Umpires: Fiona Richards and Chris Watts

- Sunrisers won the toss and elected to bat.
- Points: South East Stars 5, Sunrisers 0

19 September 2020
10:30 BST
Scorecard

Western Storm; 288/6 (50 overs)	v	Sunrisers; 241 (49 overs)
Georgia Hennessy 105 (110); Katie Wolfe 2/34 (10 overs)		Grace Scrivens 72 (73); Georgia Hennessy 2/29 (6 overs)

Western Storm won by 47 runs
County Ground, Bristol
Umpires: Mark Newell and Yvonne Dolphin-Cooper

- Sunrisers won the toss and elected to field.
- Points: Western Storm 4, Sunrisers 0

== Statistics ==
=== Batting ===
Player	Matches	Innings	NO	Runs	HS	Average	Strike rate	100s	50s	4s	6s
Hayley Brown	1	1	0	16	16	16.00	34.78	0	0	0	0
Amara Carr	6	6	0	116	99	19.33	75.32	0	1	11	0
Kelly Castle	6	6	1	85	25	17.00	57.43	0	0	3	0
Naomi Dattani	6	6	0	125	42	20.83	58.96	0	0	15	0
Jo Gardner	6	6	0	193	54	32.16	69.17	0	1	19	3
Gayatri Gole	1	1	0	4	4	4.00	30.76	0	0	1	0
Cordelia Griffith	4	4	0	84	41	21.00	79.24	0	0	12	1
Alice Macleod	6	6	0	68	35	11.33	60.17	0	0	8	0
Katie Midwood	5	5	1	57	27	14.25	56.43	0	0	4	0
Sonali Patel	6	6	1	24	9*	4.80	39.34	0	0	1	0
Mia Rogers	1	1	0	10	10	10.00	62.50	0	0	0	0
Grace Scrivens	6	6	0	137	72	22.83	58.54	0	1	16	0
Emily Thorpe	2	2	1	23	12*	23.00	92.00	0	0	3	0
Mady Villiers	2	2	0	76	64	38.00	76.76	0	1	6	0
Fran Wilson	2	2	0	40	29	20.00	88.88	0	0	6	1
Katie Wolfe	6	6	2	13	7	3.25	40.62	0	0	1	0
Source: ESPN Cricinfo

=== Bowling ===
Player	Matches	Innings	Overs	Maidens	Runs	Wickets	BBI	Average	Economy	Strike rate
Kelly Castle	6	3	12.0	0	95	1	1/15	95.00	7.91	72.0
Naomi Dattani	6	4	12.0	1	81	0	–	–	6.75	–
Jo Gardner	6	6	38.5	0	208	7	2/13	29.71	5.35	33.2
Gayatri Gole	1	1	5.0	0	41	0	–	–	8.20	–
Alice Macleod	6	6	37.0	0	196	4	2/64	49.00	5.29	55.5
Katie Midwood	5	5	39.0	2	180	2	2/33	90.00	4.61	117.0
Sonali Patel	6	6	31.5	2	165	7	4/52	23.57	5.18	27.2
Grace Scrivens	6	4	28.2	3	144	3	1/27	48.00	5.08	56.6
Emily Thorpe	2	2	5.0	0	32	0	–	–	6.40	–
Mady Villiers	2	2	20.0	0	97	1	1/49	97.00	4.85	120.0
Katie Wolfe	6	6	44.2	4	213	7	2/34	30.42	4.80	38.0
Source: ESPN Cricinfo

=== Fielding ===
Player	Matches	Innings	Catches
Hayley Brown	1	1	1
Kelly Castle	6	6	1
Naomi Dattani	6	6	3
Jo Gardner	6	6	1
Gayatri Gole	1	1	0
Cordelia Griffith	4	4	1
Alice Macleod	6	6	1
Katie Midwood	5	5	0
Sonali Patel	6	6	0
Mia Rogers	1	1	1
Grace Scrivens	6	6	1
Emily Thorpe	2	2	0
Mady Villiers	2	2	0
Fran Wilson	2	2	2
Katie Wolfe	6	6	1
Source: ESPN Cricinfo

=== Wicket-keeping ===
Player	Matches	Innings	Catches	Stumpings
Amara Carr	6	6	3	1
Source: ESPN Cricinfo
