= 2018 Western Storm season =

English cricket season

Western Storm
2018 season
- Coach: Trevor Griffin
- Captain: Heather Knight
- Overseas player: Smriti Mandhana; Rachel Priest; Stafanie Taylor
- WCSL: 3rd
- Most runs: Smriti Mandhana (421)
- Most wickets: Freya Davies (8)
- Most catches: Danielle Gibson (5)
- Most wicket-keeping dismissals: Rachel Priest (11)

The 2018 season was Western Storm's third season, in which they competed in the Women's Cricket Super League, a Twenty20 competition. The side finished second in the initial group stage, therefore progressing to the semi-final. However, they lost in the semi-final to the eventual winners Surrey Stars by 9 runs.

The side was captained by Heather Knight and coached by Trevor Griffin. They played three home matches at the County Ground, Taunton and one apiece at the County Ground, Bristol and College Ground, Cheltenham.

== Squad ==
Western Storm announced their full 15-player squad for the season on 17 July 2018. Age given is at the start of Western Storm's first match of the season (22 July 2018).

Name	Nationality	Birth date	Batting style	Bowling style	Notes
Batters
Sophie Luff	England	6 December 1993 (aged 24)	Right-handed	Right-arm medium	
Smriti Mandhana	India	18 July 1996 (aged 22)	Left-handed	Right-arm medium	Overseas player
Lauren Parfitt	Wales	1 April 1994 (aged 24)	Right-handed	Left-arm medium	
Fran Wilson	England	7 November 1991 (aged 26)	Right-handed	Right-arm off break	
All-rounders
Naomi Dattani	England	28 April 1994 (aged 24)	Left-handed	Left-arm medium	
Heather Knight	England	26 December 1990 (aged 27)	Right-handed	Right-arm off break	Captain
Alice Macleod	England	14 May 1994 (aged 24)	Right-handed	Right-arm off break	
Rebecca Silk	England	16 November 1994 (aged 23)	Right-handed	Right-arm off break	
Stafanie Taylor	West Indies	11 June 1991 (aged 27)	Right-handed	Right-arm off break	Overseas player
Wicket-keepers
Amara Carr	England	17 April 1994 (aged 24)	Right-handed	—	
Rachel Priest	New Zealand	13 June 1985 (aged 33)	Right-handed	—	Overseas player
Bowlers
Freya Davies	England	27 October 1995 (aged 22)	Right-handed	Right=arm medium	
Danielle Gibson	England	30 April 2001 (aged 17)	Right-handed	Right-arm medium	
Claire Nicholas	Wales	8 September 1986 (aged 31)	Right-handed	Right-arm off break	
Anya Shrubsole	England	7 December 1991 (aged 26)	Right-handed	Right-arm medium	

== Women's Cricket Super League ==
=== Season standings ===
Pos	Team	Pld	W	L	T	NR	BP	Pts	NRR
1	Loughborough Lightning	10	7	3	0	0	5	33	1.361
2	Western Storm	10	6	3	0	1	4	30	0.919
3	Surrey Stars	10	5	4	0	1	2	24	−0.404
4	Lancashire Thunder	10	5	5	0	0	1	21	−0.825
5	Yorkshire Diamonds	10	3	6	0	1	1	15	−0.290
6	Southern Vipers	10	2	7	0	1	0	10	−0.490

Source: ESPN Cricinfo

Advanced to the final
Advanced to the semi-final

=== League stage ===
22 July 2018
14:30
Scorecard

Yorkshire Diamonds; 162/5 (20 overs)	v	Western Storm; 166/3 (15.3 overs)
Delissa Kimmince 55*(41); Freya Davies 2/28 (4 overs)		Heather Knight 97 (62); Alice Davidson-Richards 2/31 (3.3 overs)

Western Storm won by 7 wickets
County Ground, Taunton
Umpires: Tim Robinson (Eng) and Martin Saggers (Eng)

- Western Storm won the toss and elected to field.
- Points: Western Storm 5, Yorkshire Diamonds 0.

26 July 2018
14:30
Scorecard

Western Storm; 132/9 (20 overs)	v	Surrey Stars; 136/3 (15.5 overs)
Smriti Mandhana 37 (21); Sophia Dunkley 3/18 (2 overs)		Sarah Taylor 50 (34); Danielle Gibson 2/34 (4 overs)

Surrey Stars won by 7 wickets
College Ground, Cheltenham
Umpires: Sue Redfern (Eng) and Mark Newell (Eng)

- Surrey Stars won the toss and elected to field.
- Points: Surrey Stars 5, Western Storm 0.

29 July 2018
10:30
Scorecard

Western Storm; 85/2 (6 overs)	v	Loughborough Lightning; 67/0 (6 overs)
Smriti Mandhana 52* (19); Georgia Elwiss 1/17 (1 over)		Sophie Devine 46* (21)

Western Storm won by 18 runs
County Ground, Taunton
Umpires: Mike Burns (Eng) and Ian Gould (Eng)
Player of the match: Smriti Mandhana (Western Storm)

- Loughborough Lightning won the toss and elected to field.
- Match reduced to 6 over per side due to rain.
- Points: Western Storm 5, Loughborough Lightning 0.

31 July 2018
14:30
Scorecard

Southern Vipers; 91 (18.1 overs)	v	Western Storm; 93/1 (9.3 overs)
Sara McGlashan 31 (30); Claire Nicholas 2/17 (4 overs)		Smriti Mandhana 43* (27); Arran Brindle 1/13 (2 overs)

Western Storm won by 9 wickets
Arundel Castle, Arundel
Umpires: Chris Watts (Eng) and Rob White (Eng)
Player of the match: Smriti Mandhana (Western Storm)

- Western Storm won the toss and elected to field.
- Points: Western Storm 5, Southern Vipers 0.

3 August 2018
14:30
Scorecard

Lancashire Thunder; 153/7 (20 overs)	v	Western Storm; 154/3 (18.2 overs)
Amy Satterthwaite 85* (57); Anya Shrubsole 2/36 (4 overs)		Smriti Mandhana 102 (61); Amy Satterthwaite 1/7 (1.2 overs)

Western Storm won by 7 wickets
Old Trafford, Manchester
Umpires: Paul Baldwin (Eng) and Sue Redfern (Eng)

- Western Storm won the toss and elected to field.
- Points: Western Storm 4, Lancashire Thunder 0.

5 August 2018
14:30
Scorecard

Yorkshire Diamonds; 172/5 (20 overs)	v	Western Storm; 174/3 (19.2 overs)
Beth Mooney 69 (42); Heather Knight 1/27 (4 overs)		Smriti Mandhana 56 (36); Katie Levick 1/16 (3 overs)

Western Storm won by 7 wickets
North Marine Road Ground, Scarborough
Umpires: James Middlebrook (Eng) and Chris Watts (Eng)

- Yorkshire Diamonds won the toss and elected to bat.
- Points: Western Storm 4, Yorkshire Diamonds 0.

9 August 2018
14:30
Scorecard

Western Storm; 185/4 (20 overs)	v	Lancashire Thunder; 109 (18.2 overs)
Heather Knight 76 (50); Sophie Ecclestone 2/27 (4 overs)		Eleanor Threlkeld 33 (32); Claire Nicholas 3/11 (3 overs)

Western Storm won by 76 runs
County Ground, Taunton
Umpires: Billy Taylor (Eng) and Sue Redfern (Eng)

- Lancashire Thunder won the toss and elected to field.
- Points: Western Storm 5, Lancashire Thunder 0.

11 August 2018
14:30
Scorecard

Southern Vipers; 62/2 (8.5 overs)	v	Western Storm
Danielle Wyatt 27 (20); Danielle Gibson 1/8 (1.5 overs)

No result
County Ground, Bristol
Umpires: Rob White (Eng) and Chris Watts (Eng)

- Western Storm won the toss and elected to field.
- Points: Western Storm 2, Southern Vipers 2.

15 August 2018
14:30
Scorecard

Western Storm; 124/6 (20 overs)	v	Loughborough Lightning; 125/1 (12.3 overs)
Smriti Mandhana 29 (27); Kirstie Gordon 3/19 (4 overs)		Rachael Haynes 66* (40); Heather Knight 1/24 (2 overs)

Loughborough Lightning won by 9 wickets
Edgbaston, Birmingham
Umpires: Nick Cook (Eng) and Graham Lloyd (Eng)
Player of the match: Rachael Haynes (Loughborough Lightning)

- Loughborough Lightning won the toss and elected to field.
- Points: Loughborough Lightning 5, Western Storm 0.

18 August 2018
14:30
Scorecard

Western Storm; 158/5 (20 overs)	v	Surrey Stars; 160/5 (19.4 overs)
Heather Knight 62 (47); Dane van Niekerk 2/20 (4 overs)		Lizelle Lee 48 (28); Heather Knight 1/18 (2 overs)

Surrey Stars won by 5 wickets
The Oval, London
Umpires: Nick Cook (Eng) and Ian Gould (Eng)
Player of the match: Lizelle Lee (Surrey Stars)

- Surrey Stars won the toss and elected to bat.
- Points: Surrey Stars 4, Western Storm 0.

=== Semi-final ===
27 August 2018
12:00
Scorecard

Surrey Stars; 162/5 (20 overs)	v	Western Storm; 153/6 (20 overs)
Nat Sciver 72* (43); Heather Knight 1/16 (2 overs)		Fran Wilson 58* (45); Nat Sciver 2/21 (4 overs)

Surrey Stars won by 9 runs
County Cricket Ground, Hove
Umpires: Jeremy Lloyds (Eng) and Neil Bainton (Eng)
Player of the match: Nat Sciver (Surrey Stars)

- Western Storm won the toss and elected to field.

== Statistics ==
=== Batting ===
Player	Matches	Innings	NO	Runs	HS	Average	Strike rate	100s	50s	4s	6s
Naomi Dattani	11	4	1	26	12	8.66	100.00	0	0	3	1
Freya Davies	11	1	1	9	9*	–	112.50	0	0	1	0
Danielle Gibson	11	1	0	3	3	3.00	60.00	0	0	0	0
Heather Knight	11	10	2	368	97	46.00	133.81	0	3	47	6
Sophie Luff	11	5	3	36	19*	18.00	97.29	0	0	2	0
Alice Macleod	2	1	1	2	2*	–	66.66	0	0	0	0
Smriti Mandhana	10	9	2	421	102	60.14	174.68	1	2	45	21
Claire Nicholas	10	1	1	2	2*	–	40.00	0	0	0	0
Rachel Priest	11	10	0	183	37	18.30	139.69	0	0	26	6
Anya Shrubsole	11	3	1	14	12	7.00	77.77	0	0	2	0
Stafanie Taylor	11	9	4	155	51*	31.00	105.44	0	1	16	1
Fran Wilson	11	8	4	132	58*	33.00	109.09	0	3	47	6
Source: ESPN Cricinfo

=== Bowling ===
Player	Matches	Innings	Overs	Maidens	Runs	Wickets	BBI	Average	Economy	Strike rate
Naomi Dattani	11	3	6.2	0	53	3	1/10	17.66	8.36	12.6
Freya Davies	11	11	37.0	0	286	8	2/28	35.75	7.72	27.7
Danielle Gibson	11	8	18.2	0	136	5	2/34	27.20	7.41	22.0
Heather Knight	11	10	23.0	0	189	6	1/10	31.50	8.21	23.0
Claire Nicholas	10	10	29.0	0	204	7	3/11	29.14	7.03	24.8
Anya Shrubsole	11	11	35.5	0	274	6	2/36	45.66	7.64	35.8
Stafanie Taylor	11	11	29.5	0	230	6	2/18	38.33	7.70	29.8
Source: ESPN Cricinfo

=== Fielding ===
Player	Matches	Innings	Catches
Naomi Dattani	11	11	1
Freya Davies	11	11	0
Danielle Gibson	11	11	5
Heather Knight	11	11	1
Sophie Luff	11	11	2
Alice Macleod	2	2	0
Smriti Mandhana	10	10	2
Claire Nicholas	10	10	2
Anya Shrubsole	11	11	0
Stafanie Taylor	11	11	2
Fran Wilson	11	11	1
Source: ESPN Cricinfo

=== Wicket-keeping ===
Player	Matches	Innings	Catches	Stumpings
Rachel Priest	11	11	5	6
Source: ESPN Cricinfo
