= Trevor Griffin =

Trevor Griffin may refer to:

- Trevor Griffin (politician)
- Trevor Griffin (cricket coach)
