= Jessica Olorenshaw =

English cricketer

Personal information
- Full name: Jessica Grace Olorenshaw
- Born: 27 January 2005 (age 21)
- Batting: Right-handed
- Bowling: Right-arm medium
- Role: Wicket-keeper

Domestic team information
- Years: Team
- 2021–present: Essex
- 2022–2023: Cambridgeshire
- 2022–2024: Sunrisers

Career statistics
Competition	WLA	WT20
Matches	6	9
Runs scored	70	146
Batting average	17.50	20.85
100s/50s	0/0	0/0
Top score	25	42*
Catches/stumpings	1/–	0/1
- Source: CricketArchive, 19 October 2024

Jessica Grace Olorenshaw (born 27 January 2005) is an English cricketer who currently plays for Essex. She plays as a right-handed batter and wicket-keeper.

== Domestic career ==
Olorenshaw made her county debut in 2021, for Essex against Surrey in the Women's Twenty20 Cup. She played four matches for the side in 2021. She played two matches for the side in the 2022 Women's Twenty20 Cup, and scored 42* from 21 balls against Cambridgeshire. She also played one match for Cambridgeshire in the competition, scoring 31 runs against Suffolk.

Olorenshaw was included in the Sunrisers Academy squad for 2021. She was again named in the Sunrisers Academy for the 2022 season, before being promoted to the first team squad in July 2022. She made her debut for the side on 9 July 2022, against Northern Diamonds in the Rachael Heyhoe Flint Trophy. She went on to play five matches overall in the competition, scoring 70 runs with a top score of 25. She was included in the Sunrisers squad for 2023, but did not play a match.

In 2021, Olorenshaw was awarded the Rachael Heyhoe Flint Award for her performances at Essex age-group level and for Felsted School in 2019. She has also played hockey, and was part of the England Under-16 set-up for two years.
