= Emily Woodhouse =

English cricketer

Personal information
- Full name: Emily Ann Woodhouse
- Born: 13 October 1996 (age 30); King's Lynn, Norfolk, England
- Batting: Right-handed
- Bowling: Right-arm off break
- Role: All-rounder

Domestic team information
- Years: Team
- 2009–2021: Norfolk
- 2021: Sunrisers

Career statistics
Competition	WLA	WT20
Matches	44	50
Runs scored	656	643
Batting average	15.61	16.92
100s/50s	0/2	0/3
Top score	50*	67
Balls bowled	1,528	814
Wickets	49	25
Bowling average	15.42	29.44
5 wickets in innings	1	0
10 wickets in match	0	0
Best bowling	5/32	3/7
Catches/stumpings	15/–	9/–
- Source: CricketArchive, 1 October 2021

Emily Ann Woodhouse (born 13 October 1996) is an English cricketer who has played for Norfolk and Sunrisers. She plays as a right-arm off break bowler and right-handed batter.

== Early life ==
Woodhouse was born on 13 October 1996 in King's Lynn, Norfolk.

== Domestic career ==
Woodhouse made her county debut in 2009, for Norfolk against Cornwall. She had a breakthrough season in the 2011 Women's County Championship, as she was her side's leading wicket-taker, with 10 wickets at an average of 10.70. She was again her side's leading wicket-taker in the 2013 Championship, and hit her maiden half-century in the Twenty20 Cup the same season. In 2014, she was Norfolk's leading run-scorer in both competitions, as well as taking 6 wickets at an average of 15.50 in the County Championship. In 2015, Woodhouse made her List A high score, scoring 50* against Northumberland. The same season, she took 3 wickets in 4 balls in a match against Cambridgeshire and Huntingdonshire, finishing with figures of 3/0.

Ahead of the following season, 2016, Woodhouse was made Norfolk's full-time captain. That season, she scored her second half-century in the County Championship, as well as taking 10 wickets at an average of 18.40. 2018 saw Woodhouse achieve both her List A best bowling figures, taking 5/32 against Lincolnshire, and her Twenty20 high score, making 67 against the same opponents. She had a strong season in the following year's Twenty20 Cup, scoring 110 runs including 58* made against Suffolk, as well as taking 7 wickets overall at an average of 12.71.

In the 2020 East of England Women's County Championship, Woodhouse was the second-highest run-scorer in the 50-over section of the competition, with 134 runs including a top score of 71. In the 2021 edition of the same tournament, she scored 108 from 100 deliveries in Norfolk's two-wicket victory over Hertfordshire.

In 2021, Woodhouse was selected in the Sunrisers squad for the upcoming season. She played two matches for the side in the Charlotte Edwards Cup.
