= Katherine Speed =

English cricketer (born 2001)

Personal information
- Full name: Katherine Elizabeth Speed
- Born: 5 October 2001 (age 25)
- Batting: Right-handed
- Bowling: Right-arm medium
- Role: All-rounder

Domestic team information
- Years: Team
- 2016–present: Essex
- 2020–2021: Huntingdonshire
- 2021–2024: Sunrisers

Career statistics
Competition	WLA	WT20
Matches	7	28
Runs scored	68	349
Batting average	11.33	15.86
100s/50s	0/0	0/0
Top score	30	33
Balls bowled	–	53
Wickets	–	3
Bowling average	–	16.66
5 wickets in innings	–	0
10 wickets in match	–	0
Best bowling	–	1/5
Catches/stumpings	1/–	4/–
- Source: CricketArchive, 19 October 2024

Katherine Elizabeth Speed (born 5 October 2001) is an English cricketer who currently plays for Essex. An all-rounder, she is a right-handed batter and right-arm medium bowler.

== Domestic career ==
Speed made her county debut in 2016, for Essex against Nottinghamshire, scoring 7*. In 2018, she helped her side to promotion from Division 3C of the Twenty20 Cup. In 2021 she took her maiden county wickets, both against Kent in consecutive games on 9 May.

Speed played for Huntingdonshire in the East of England Championship in 2020 and 2021, including hitting 62 from 53 balls in a match against Hertfordshire in the 2020 tournament. In 2022, she only played for Essex, playing two matches in the Twenty20 Cup, scoring 45 runs. She played four matches for the side in the 2023 Women's Twenty20 Cup, scoring 47 runs and taking one wicket.

In 2021, Speed was selected in the Sunrisers squad for their upcoming season. She made her debut for the side on 29 May, against South East Stars in the Rachael Heyhoe Flint Trophy. She was ever-present in Sunrisers' 2021 Charlotte Edwards Cup campaign, scoring 60 runs including her Twenty20 high score of 26*. She played four matches for Sunrisers in 2022, across the Charlotte Edwards Cup and the Rachael Heyhoe Flint Trophy. She was again in the Sunrisers squad in 2023 and 2024, but did not play a match in either season.
