= Emily Thorpe =

English cricketer (born 1999)

Personal information
- Full name: Emily Louise Thorpe
- Born: 27 January 1999 (age 27)
- Batting: Right-handed
- Bowling: Right-arm leg break
- Role: Bowler

Domestic team information
- Years: Team
- 2017–present: Middlesex
- 2020–2021: Sunrisers

Career statistics
| Competition | WLA | WT20 |
|---|---|---|
| Matches | 12 | 26 |
| Runs scored | 34 | 7 |
| Batting average | 11.33 | 7.00 |
| 100s/50s | 0/0 | 0/0 |
| Top score | 12* | 7* |
| Balls bowled | 284 | 444 |
| Wickets | 6 | 20 |
| Bowling average | 39.16 | 16.95 |
| 5 wickets in innings | 0 | 0 |
| 10 wickets in match | 0 | 0 |
| Best bowling | 3/24 | 3/12 |
| Catches/stumpings | 1/– | 2/– |
- Source: CricketArchive, 23 October 2023

Emily Louise Thorpe (born 27 January 1999) is an English cricketer who currently plays for Middlesex. She plays as a right-arm leg break bowler. She previously played for Sunrisers.

== Domestic career ==
Thorpe made her county debut in 2017, for Middlesex against Yorkshire. She was Middlesex's second-leading wicket-taker in the 2017 Women's Twenty20 Cup, with 8 wickets at an average of 18.50. In 2019, Thorpe achieved her List A best bowling figures, taking 3/24 in a victory over Berkshire. She took 1 wicket in four matches for the side in the 2021 Women's Twenty20 Cup. In the 2022 Women's Twenty20 Cup, she was Middlesex's joint-leading wicket-taker, with 7 wickets at an average of 12.14. She played one match in the 2023 Women's Twenty20 Cup, taking two wickets.

In 2020, Thorpe played for Sunrisers in the Rachael Heyhoe Flint Trophy. She appeared in two matches, scoring 23 runs but failing to take a wicket. In 2021, she played three matches for the side across the Rachael Heyhoe Flint Trophy and the 2021 Charlotte Edwards Cup, taking two wickets.
