= Mia Rogers =

English cricketer

Personal information
- Full name: Mia Elizabeth Wright Rogers
- Born: 29 January 2002 (age 24); Buckinghamshire, England
- Batting: Right-handed
- Role: Wicket-keeper

Domestic team information
- Years: Team
- 2017–present: Berkshire
- 2021: → Kent (on loan)
- 2020–2023: Sunrisers

Career statistics
Competition	WLA	WT20
Matches	14	39
Runs scored	46	462
Batting average	7.66	18.48
100s/50s	0/0	0/2
Top score	12*	51*
Catches/stumpings	6/3	9/7
- Source: CricketArchive, 20 October 2023

Mia Elizabeth Wright Rogers (born 29 January 2002) is an English cricketer who currently plays for Berkshire. She plays as a wicket-keeper and right-handed batter. She has also represented England at lacrosse at age-group level.

== Early life ==
Rogers was born on 29 January 2002 in Buckinghamshire. She attended Wycombe Abbey and Durham University.

== Domestic career ==
Rogers made her county debut in 2017, for Berkshire against Kent. She helped her side to winning Division 3A in the 2019 Women's Twenty20 Cup, scoring 25 runs and making 2 stumpings. She scored 63 runs for the side in the 2021 Women's Twenty20 Cup, including her Twenty20 high score of 30. In June 2021, it was announced that Rogers had joined Kent on loan for the remainder of the Women's London Championship, playing two matches for the side. In 2022, she was Berkshire's leading run-scorer in the Twenty20 Cup, scoring 174 runs including her maiden Twenty20 half-century, 50* from 35 deliveries against Shropshire. She was the side's leading run-scorer again in the 2023 Women's Twenty20 Cup, with 93 runs including one half-century in three matches.

In 2020, Rogers played for Sunrisers in the Rachael Heyhoe Flint Trophy. She appeared in one match, scoring 10 runs against Western Storm. In 2021, she played eight matches for the side across the Rachael Heyhoe Flint Trophy and the Charlotte Edwards Cup, scoring 31 runs. She played eleven matches for Sunrisers in 2022, across the Charlotte Edwards Cup and the Rachael Heyhoe Flint Trophy, scoring 58 runs. She was included in the Sunrisers squad for 2023, but did not play a match.
