= Sonali Patel =

English cricketer (born 2003)

Personal information
- Full name: Sonali Patel
- Born: 23 May 2003 (age 23)
- Batting: Right-handed
- Bowling: Right-arm medium
- Role: Bowler

Domestic team information
- Years: Team
- 2018–present: Middlesex
- 2020–2022: Sunrisers

Career statistics
Competition	WLA	WT20
Matches	18	17
Runs scored	55	32
Batting average	5.00	6.40
100s/50s	0/0	0/0
Top score	10	8*
Balls bowled	602	186
Wickets	24	7
Bowling average	19.50	28.85
5 wickets in innings	0	0
10 wickets in match	0	0
Best bowling	4/40	2/17
Catches/stumpings	3/–	4/–
- Source: CricketArchive, 23 October 2023

Sonali Patel (born 23 May 2003) is an English cricketer who currently plays for Middlesex. She plays as a right-arm medium bowler. She has previously played for Sunrisers.

== Domestic career ==
Patel made her county debut in 2018, for Middlesex in a Twenty20 Cup match against Worcestershire. She went on to play one more match in the tournament that season, which Middlesex were victorious in. She played all seven matches in the County Championship the following season, where Middlesex won Division 2, with Patel taking 9 wickets at an average of 11.00. She took four wickets in eight matches for the side in the 2021 Women's Twenty20 Cup. She was also the joint-leading wicket-taker in the 2021 Women's London Championship, with 7 wickets.

In 2020, Patel played for Sunrisers in the Rachael Heyhoe Flint Trophy. She appeared in all six matches, and taking 7 wickets at an average of 23.57. She was the joint-leading wicket-taker for the team, including taking 4/52 against South East Stars. In 2021, Patel played seven matches for the side, taking 7 wickets in the Rachael Heyhoe Flint Trophy and 3 wickets in the Charlotte Edwards Cup. In a Rachael Heyhoe Flint Trophy match against North West Thunder, Patel took a hat-trick, and ended with figures of 4/40, her List A best bowling figures. She played two matches for the side in 2022, both in the Rachael Heyhoe Flint Trophy, taking one wicket.
