= Gayatri Gole =

English cricketer (born 1998)

Personal information
- Full name: Gayatri Kamal Sonya Gole
- Born: 22 July 1998 (age 28); Camden, Greater London, England
- Batting: Right-handed
- Bowling: Right-arm medium
- Role: Bowler

Domestic team information
- Years: Team
- 2016–present: Middlesex
- 2018: Surrey Stars
- 2020–2022: Sunrisers

Career statistics
| Competition | WLA | WT20 |
|---|---|---|
| Matches | 25 | 48 |
| Runs scored | 112 | 162 |
| Batting average | 8.00 | 10.80 |
| 100s/50s | 0/0 | 0/0 |
| Top score | 16 | 23 |
| Balls bowled | 856 | 722 |
| Wickets | 15 | 22 |
| Bowling average | 40.80 | 32.50 |
| 5 wickets in innings | 0 | 0 |
| 10 wickets in match | 0 | 0 |
| Best bowling | 3/16 | 3/12 |
| Catches/stumpings | 2/– | 11/– |
- Source: CricketArchive, 23 October 2023

Gayatri Kamal Sonya Gole (born 22 July 1998) is an English cricketer who currently plays for Middlesex. She plays as a right-arm medium bowler. She has previously played for Sunrisers, and was also part of the Surrey Stars squad in the 2018 Women's Cricket Super League.

== Early life ==
Gole was born on 22 July 1998 in Camden, Greater London.

== Domestic career ==
Gole made her county debut in 2016, for Middlesex against Yorkshire. In 2018, Gole was part of the Middlesex side that won the Twenty20 Cup, and took 5 wickets in the competition at an average of 25.60. In 2019, Gole achieved her List A best bowling figures, taking 3/16 against Devon. In 2021, Gole took 7 wickets in 7 matches at an average of 14.71 in the Twenty20 Cup. She played six matches in the 2022 Women's Twenty20 Cup, taking one wicket. She played two matches in the 2023 Women's Twenty20 Cup, taking one wicket.

Gole was also part of the Surrey Stars squad in the 2018 Women's Cricket Super League, when the side won the competition, but she did not play a match.

In 2020, Gole played for Sunrisers in the Rachael Heyhoe Flint Trophy. She appeared in one match, bowling 5 overs and scoring 4 runs against Western Storm. She appeared in 10 matches for the side in 2021, across the Rachael Heyhoe Flint Trophy and the Charlotte Edwards Cup, taking three wickets. She played seven matches for Sunrisers in 2022, across the Charlotte Edwards Cup and the Rachael Heyhoe Flint Trophy, without taking a wicket.
