= Fran Wilson =

English cricketer and cricket coach (born 1991)

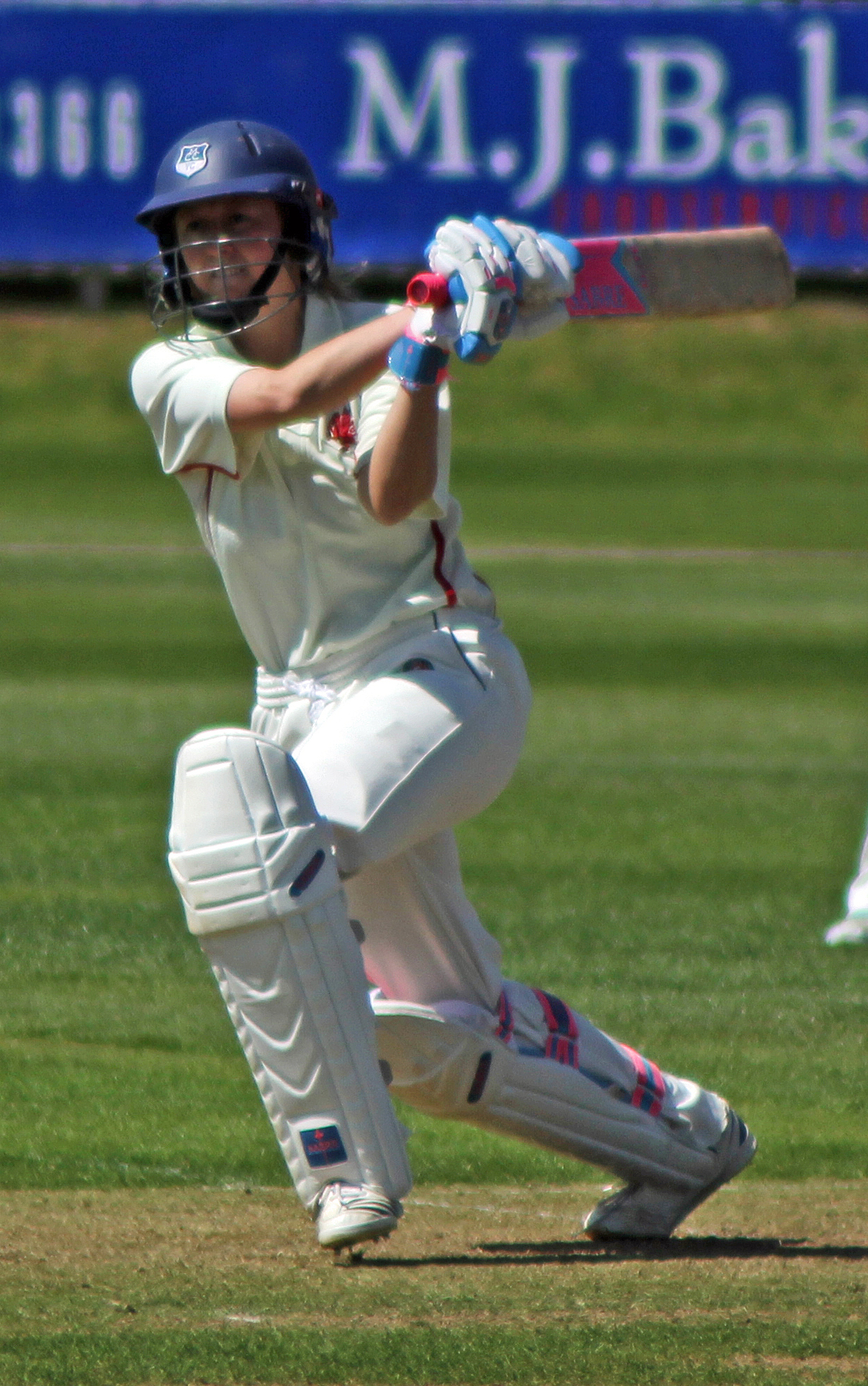
- Wilson batting for Somerset in 2013

Personal information
- Full name: Frances Claire Wilson
- Born: 7 November 1991 (age 35); Farnham, Surrey, England
- Batting: Right-handed
- Bowling: Right-arm off break
- Role: Batter

International information
- National side: England (2010–2021)
- Only Test (cap 158): 9 November 2017 v Australia
- ODI debut (cap 118): 15 November 2010 v Sri Lanka
- Last ODI: 28 February 2021 v New Zealand
- ODI shirt no.: 35
- T20I debut (cap 28): 19 November 2010 v Sri Lanka
- Last T20I: 7 March 2021 v New Zealand

Domestic team information
- Years: Team
- 2006–2014: Somerset
- 2015–2018: Middlesex
- 2016–2019: Western Storm
- 2016/17–2017/18: Wellington
- 2017/18: Sydney Thunder
- 2019–2021: Kent
- 2019/20: Hobart Hurricanes
- 2020–2021: Sunrisers
- 2021: Oval Invincibles
- 2022–2024: Gloucestershire
- 2022–2024: Western Storm
- 2022: Welsh Fire
- 2022/23: Canterbury
- 2023: Trent Rockets
- 2024: Birmingham Phoenix
- 2025: Somerset

Career statistics
Competition	WTest	WODI	WT20I	WLA
Matches	1	33	30	206
Runs scored	13	468	356	5,202
Batting average	13.00	22.28	22.25	31.33
100s/50s	0/0	0/2	0/0	2/33
Top score	13	85*	43*	110
Balls bowled	–	–	–	138
Wickets	–	–	–	4
Bowling average	–	–	–	38.25
5 wickets in innings	–	–	–	0
10 wickets in match	–	–	–	0
Best bowling	–	–	–	1/21
Catches/stumpings	0/–	14/–	7/–	76/–
- Source: CricketArchive, 8 November 2025

Frances Claire Wilson (born 7 November 1991) is an English former cricketer and now cricket coach. A right handed batter and right arm off break bowler, she made 64 appearances for England across three formats between 2010 and 2021 including being part of the tean which won the 2017 50-over World Cup. Wilson made her One Day International debut against Sri Lanka at Colombo on 15 November 2010 and played her first Twenty20 International game for her country four days later. Her only Test match was against Australia in November 2017.

In club and franchise cricket, she played for Somerset, Middlesex, Kent, Gloucestershire, Sunrisers, Western Storm, Oval Invincibles, Welsh Fire, Trent Rockets, Birmingham Phoenix abd Canterbury.

Wilson retired from professional cricket in November 2025 to take up the job as head coach of Gloucestershire Women.

== Career ==
In April 2015, Wilson was named as one of the England women's Academy squad tour to Dubai, where they played their Australian counterparts in two 50-over games and two Twenty20 matches. Although not in the initial England Women's Ashes squad, she was added to the party at the beginning of August, after poor performances from Amy Jones.

Wilson was a member of the winning women's team at the 2017 Women's Cricket World Cup held in England.

She made her Test debut for England Women against Australia Women on 9 November 2017 in the Women's Ashes.

In November 2018, she was added to England's squad for the 2018 ICC Women's World Twenty20, after Katherine Brunt was ruled out with a back injury. In February 2019, she was awarded a full central contract by the England and Wales Cricket Board (ECB) for 2019. In June 2019, the ECB named her in England's squad for their opening match against Australia to contest the Women's Ashes. In January 2020, she was named in England's squad for the 2020 ICC Women's T20 World Cup in Australia.

On 18 June 2020, Wilson was named in a squad of 24 players to begin training ahead of international women's fixtures starting in England following the COVID-19 pandemic. In June 2021, Wilson was named as in England's Test squad for their one-off match against India. In 2021, she was drafted by Oval Invincibles for the inaugural season of The Hundred and won the title with them.

In October 2021, Wilson announced her retirement from international cricket. The following month, it was announced that she had joined Western Storm, from Sunrisers, and in 2022 it was announced that she had also left Kent, due to her cricketing commitments in the South West. It was later announced that she had joined Gloucestershire, as both a player and an age-group coach.

In April 2022, she was signed by the Welsh Fire for the 2022 season of The Hundred.

Having spent the 2025 season back at Somerset, she announced her retirement from professional cricket in November 2025, after agreeing to become head coach at Gloucestershire Women.
