= Lissy Macleod =

English cricketer

Personal information
- Full name: Alice Jessamy Macleod
- Born: 14 May 1994 (age 32); Ascot, Berkshire, England
- Batting: Right-handed
- Bowling: Right-arm off break
- Role: All-rounder

Domestic team information
- Years: Team
- 2008–2019: Berkshire
- 2021: → Essex (on loan)
- 2016: Southern Vipers
- 2017–2018: Western Storm
- 2020–2024: Sunrisers
- 2021: Welsh Fire
- 2025–present: Essex

Career statistics
Competition	WLA	WT20
Matches	110	99
Runs scored	2,496	1,515
Batting average	25.46	18.93
100s/50s	1/14	0/7
Top score	107	82*
Balls bowled	3,422	1,274
Wickets	75	56
Bowling average	32.14	20.21
5 wickets in innings	0	0
10 wickets in match	0	0
Best bowling	4/26	4/11
Catches/stumpings	35/–	22/–
- Source: CricketArchive, 19 October 2024

Alice Jessamy Macleod (born 14 May 1994) is an English cricketer who currently plays for Essex. An all-rounder, she is a right-handed batter and right-arm off break bowler. She previously played for Berkshire and Sunrisers, as well as Southern Vipers and Western Storm in the Women's Cricket Super League and Welsh Fire in The Hundred.

== Early life ==
Macleod was born on 14 May 1994 in Ascot, Berkshire.

== Domestic career ==
Macleod made her county debut for in 2008, for Berkshire against Nottinghamshire. In 2010, she hit 61 in the Final of the Twenty20 Cup to help Berkshire to their first Twenty20 title. The following season, she achieved her T20 best bowling figures, taking 4/11 against Wales. In 2015, she hit her maiden county century, scoring 107 in a Championship match against Lancashire. In 2019, Macleod scored 249 runs at an average of 49.80 in the County Championship, as well as taking 12 wickets.

Macleod missed Berkshire's 2021 Women's Twenty20 Cup campaign due to work commitments, and subsequently went on loan to Essex for the Women's London Championship.

Macleod also played for Southern Vipers in the Women's Cricket Super League in 2016 and for Western Storm in 2017 and 2018. She therefore won two WCSL titles, one with Vipers in 2016 and one with Storm in 2017. Overall, she played 10 Super League matches, scoring 48 runs with a high score of 30, for Storm against Surrey Stars.

In 2020, Macleod played for Sunrisers in the Rachael Heyhoe Flint Trophy. She appeared in all six matches, scoring 68 runs and taking 4 wickets, with best bowling figures of 2/64 against Western Storm. In 2021, she was the side's second-highest run-scorer in the Rachael Heyhoe Flint Trophy, with 214 runs including 79 made against Southern Vipers. She also played for Welsh Fire in the inaugural season of The Hundred, appearing in five matches and scoring 33 runs. She played just one match in 2022, for Sunrisers in the Rachael Heyhoe Flint Trophy. She played eight matches for the side in 2023, across the Rachael Heyhoe Flint Trophy and the Charlotte Edwards Cup, with a top score of 34. In 2024, she played 20 matches for Sunrisers, across the Rachael Heyhoe Flint Trophy and the Charlotte Edwards Cup, scoring three half-centuries.

Macleod also played in the 2011 and 2012 Super Fours, for Diamonds and Emeralds, respectively.
