= Cordelia Griffith =

English cricketer (born 1995)

Personal information
- Full name: Cordelia Lauren Griffith
- Born: 19 September 1995 (age 31); Islington, Greater London, England
- Batting: Right-handed
- Bowling: Right-arm medium
- Role: Batter
- Relatives: Frank Griffith (father)

Domestic team information
- Years: Team
- 2010–2018: Essex
- 2018: → Middlesex (on loan)
- 2016–2017: Surrey Stars
- 2019–present: Middlesex
- 2019: Yorkshire Diamonds
- 2020–2024: Sunrisers
- 2021–2022: Manchester Originals
- 2023: Oval Invincibles
- 2024–present: London Spirit

Career statistics
Competition	WLA	WT20
Matches	72	104
Runs scored	2,101	1,470
Batting average	31.83	18.37
100s/50s	3/13	0/7
Top score	155*	73
Balls bowled	271	150
Wickets	7	2
Bowling average	27.42	83.50
5 wickets in innings	0	0
10 wickets in match	0	0
Best bowling	1/6	1/12
Catches/stumpings	21/–	23/–
- Source: CricketArchive, 19 October 2024

Cordelia Lauren Griffith (born 19 September 1995) is an English cricketer who currently plays for Middlesex and London Spirit. She plays as a right-handed batter. She has previously played for Essex and Sunrisers, as well as Surrey Stars and Yorkshire Diamonds in the Women's Cricket Super League, and Manchester Originals and Oval Invincibles in The Hundred.

== Early life ==
Griffith was born on 19 September 1995 in Islington, Greater London. Her father, Frank, played county cricket for Derbyshire.

In 2018, Griffith completed a Master of Laws at Durham University.

== Domestic career ==
Griffith made her county debut in 2010, for Essex in a match against Warwickshire. She scored 5 as her team lost by 56 runs. She played two further games that season, but after this did not become a regular in Essex's side until 2013. Her first breakthrough season came in the 2016 Women's County Championship, scoring 177 runs at 35.40, including two half-centuries. She also began captaining Essex in 2016, a post she held until the end of the 2018 season. The following season, despite only playing two Championship matches, she scored 182 runs including her maiden county century, 113* against Gloucestershire in a play-off to help secure her side's promotion to Division 2. In 2018 she scored her second List A century, with 155* against Suffolk.

Griffith was loaned to Middlesex for the 2018 Women's Twenty20 Cup, but was injured for the whole tournament and only managed to appear once for her new side, in the London Cup. She signed permanently for Middlesex ahead of the 2019 season and made an instant impression, ending the season as the side's leading run-scorer in the Twenty20 Cup and second-highest run-scorer in the County Championship, as well as hitting her third List A century. She scored 187 runs for the side in the 2021 Women's Twenty20 Cup, including her Twenty20 high score of 73, made against Hampshire. She scored 60 runs in the 2022 Women's Twenty20 Cup without being dismissed, playing two matches.

Griffith also played for Surrey Stars in the Women's Cricket Super League in 2016 and 2017, and for Yorkshire Diamonds in 2019. In 2016, she played 5 matches and scored 35 runs. She did not play for the side in 2017. In 2019, for the Diamonds, she played three matches and scored 18 runs.

In 2020, Griffith played for Sunrisers in the Rachael Heyhoe Flint Trophy. She appeared in 4 matches, scoring 84 runs at an average of 21.00, with a best of 41 against Western Storm. In December 2020, it was announced that Griffith was one of the 41 female cricketers that had signed a full-time domestic contract. In 2021, she was Sunrisers' leading run-scorer in the Rachael Heyhoe Flint Trophy, with 273 runs at an average of 39.00. She hit two half-centuries, including 91 made against Southern Vipers. She was also her side's leading run-scorer in the Charlotte Edwards Cup, with 129 runs including one half-century. Griffith also played for Manchester Originals in The Hundred, scoring 20 runs in five innings. In 2022, she played eight matches for Sunrisers, across the Charlotte Edwards Cup and the Rachael Heyhoe Flint Trophy, and was the side's second-highest run-scorer in the Rachael Heyhoe Flint Trophy, with 178 runs including two half-centuries. She also played four matches for Manchester Originals in The Hundred.

In 2023, she played 14 matches for Sunrisers, across the Rachael Heyhoe Flint Trophy and the Charlotte Edwards Cup, and was the side's leading run-scorer in the Charlotte Edwards Cup, with 205 runs including two half-centuries. She also played six matches for Oval Invincibles in The Hundred, scoring 64 runs.

Griffith top scored for Sunrisers with 57 off 68 balls as they defeated South East Stars to win the 2024 Rachael Heyhoe Flint Trophy final on 21 September 2024. Overall in 2024, she played 18 matches for Sunrisers, across the Rachael Heyhoe Flint Trophy and the Charlotte Edwards Cup, scoring four half-centuries.

In October 2024, she signed a professional contract for Essex Women ahead of the 2025 women's domestic cricket restructure.

Griffith has also played for various England age-group and academy sides, as well as appearing in the 2013 Super Fours for Sapphires.
