= Grace Scrivens =

English cricketer

Personal information
- Full name: Grace Elizabeth Scrivens
- Born: 10 November 2003 (age 23); Maidstone, Kent, England
- Batting: Left-handed
- Bowling: Right-arm off break
- Role: All-rounder

Domestic team information
- Years: Team
- 2018–2024: Kent
- 2020–2024: Sunrisers
- 2021–2023: London Spirit
- 2024–present: Trent Rockets
- 2025–present: Essex

Career statistics
Competition	WLA	WT20
Matches	51	77
Runs scored	1,610	1,494
Batting average	35.77	26.67
100s/50s	2/12	0/10
Top score	118*	94*
Balls bowled	1,552	572
Wickets	30	24
Bowling average	38.30	26.25
5 wickets in innings	0	0
10 wickets in match	0	0
Best bowling	4/20	4/33
Catches/stumpings	19/–	15/–
- Source: CricketArchive, 19 October 2024

Grace Elizabeth Scrivens (born 10 November 2003) is an English cricketer who currently plays for Essex and Trent Rockets. An all-rounder, she is a left-handed batter and right-arm off break bowler. She previously played for Sunrisers.

== Early life ==
Scrivens was born on 10 November 2003 in Kent.

== Domestic career ==
Scrivens made her county debut in 2018, for Kent against Surrey. In her second match, she hit 24* from 17 balls in a Twenty20 against Yorkshire to help her side to a 5 wicket victory. In 2019, she was part of the Kent squad that won the 2019 Women's County Championship. In 2021, she was Kent's leading run-scorer as they won the South East Group of the 2021 Women's Twenty20 Cup, with 191 runs at an average of 47.75, as well as taking 4 wickets. She hit 94* from 62 balls in a match against Surrey, which was named the Women's Moment of the Year at the end of season Kent Cricket Awards. Scrivens was also voted the Players' Player of the Year. In the 2022 Women's Twenty20 Cup, she was the third-highest run-scorer across the entire competition, with 265 runs including three half-centuries.

In 2020, Scrivens played for Sunrisers in the Rachael Heyhoe Flint Trophy. She appeared in all six matches, scoring 137 runs at an average of 22.83 and taking 3 wickets. She hit her List A high score in her final game of the tournament, scoring 72 against Western Storm. In 2021, she scored 161 runs and took 4 wickets in the Rachael Heyhoe Flint Trophy, as well as scoring 92 runs and taking 5 wickets in the Charlotte Edwards Cup. Scrivens top-scored with 34* in the side's only victory that season, over Western Storm. She also played two matches for London Spirit in The Hundred. At the end of the 2021 season, it was announced that Scrivens had signed a professional contract with Sunrisers. In April 2022, she was bought by the London Spirit for the 2022 season of The Hundred.

Scrivens was ever-present for Sunrisers in 2022, across the Charlotte Edwards Cup and the Rachael Heyhoe Flint Trophy. In the Charlotte Edwards Cup, she scored 141 runs as well as taking seven wickets, the joint most for her side. In a Charlotte Edwards Cup match against Western Storm, she scored 56 with the bat and took 4/33 with the ball. In the Rachael Heyhoe Flint Trophy, Scrivens was the tournament's joint-leading wicket-taker, with 13 wickets at an average of 14.69, and the tournament's third-highest run-scorer, with 297 runs at an average of 49.50 including four half-centuries. She took a four-wicket haul and scored a half-century against South East Stars, as well as taking 4/20 from 10 overs against Northern Diamonds and scoring half-centuries against Western Storm, Lightning and Central Sparks. She was also ever-present for London Spirit in The Hundred, scoring 57 runs and taking three wickets. At the end of the season, Scrivens was awarded Sunrisers' Player of the Year, Batter of the Year, Bowler of the Year and Supporters' Rachael Heyhoe Flint Trophy Player of the Competition awards. She was also nominated for the PCA Women's Young Player of the Year award.

In 2023, she was Sunrisers' leading run-scorer in the Rachael Heyhoe Flint Trophy, with 398 runs at an average of 39.80. She scored her maiden List A century in September 2023, scoring 107 against The Blaze. She was also named captain of Sunrisers in September 2023. She played four matches for London Spirit in The Hundred, scoring 38 runs. In 2024, she played 26 matches for Sunrisers, across the Rachael Heyhoe Flint Trophy and the Charlotte Edwards Cup, and was the side's leading run-scorer in the Rachael Heyhoe Flint Trophy with 553 runs including one century as she captained the side to the title.

The domestic structure of Women's cricket changed for the 2025 season and Scrivens moved to Essex, a newly professional women's side, along with many of her Sunrisers teammates. It was announced in January 2025 that she would be the captain of Essex.

== International career ==
In October 2022, Scrivens was selected in the England Under-19 squad for the 2023 ICC Under-19 Women's T20 World Cup. She was later named as captain of the side. She was ever-present for the side as they reached the final, scoring 293 runs at an average of 41.85 and taking 9 wickets. She ended the tournament as the second-highest run-scorer across the competition, scoring three half-centuries including the tournament's highest score, 93 against Ireland. Against Zimbabwe, she took 4/2 from her four overs. She was subsequently named Player of the Tournament.
