= Jo Gardner =

English cricketer

Personal information
- Full name: Joanne Lynda Gardner
- Born: 25 March 1997 (age 29); Newport, Isle of Wight, England
- Batting: Right-handed
- Bowling: Right-arm off break
- Role: All-rounder

Domestic team information
- Years: Team
- 2010–2016: Northamptonshire
- 2017–2022: Warwickshire
- 2021: → Essex (on loan)
- 2018–2019: Loughborough Lightning
- 2020–2024: Sunrisers
- 2021: Oval Invincibles
- 2022: Southern Brave
- 2023–present: Northamptonshire
- 2023: Trent Rockets
- 2024–present: Oval Invincibles

Career statistics
Competition	WLA	WT20
Matches	97	116
Runs scored	1,332	1,145
Batting average	19.58	18.17
100s/50s	0/6	0/3
Top score	86	79*
Balls bowled	2,223	1,076
Wickets	70	36
Bowling average	21.87	28.58
5 wickets in innings	3	0
10 wickets in match	0	0
Best bowling	6/21	3/25
Catches/stumpings	29/–	36/–
- Source: CricketArchive, 19 October 2024

Joanne Lynda Gardner (born 25 March 1997) is an English cricketer who currently plays for Northamptonshire and Oval Invincibles. She plays as an all-rounder, bowling right-arm off break and batting right-handed. She has previously played for Warwickshire, Essex, Loughborough Lightning, Sunrisers, Southern Brave and Trent Rockets.

== Early life ==
Gardner was born on 25 March 1997 in Newport, Isle of Wight. She attended Loughborough University.

== Domestic career ==
Gardner made her county debut in 2011, for Northamptonshire against Derbyshire. She scored 2 runs and bowled 7 overs without taking a wicket. 2013 was a breakthrough year for Gardner, as she took 15 Championship wickets at an average of 14.26, as well as taking her maiden five-for, with 6/21 against Oxfordshire. In 2014, she was the leading wicket-taker across the whole Championship, taking 19 wickets at an average of 9.47. She took 5/23 against both Scotland and Hampshire. She hit her maiden county half-century in 2015, against Leicestershire, and went on to hit three more in 2016, and was the leading run-scorer for her side in both competitions.

In 2017, Gardner joined Warwickshire. She hit 54* in her first match for her new side, in a 2 wicket victory over Kent. Gardner was part of the Warwickshire team that won the 2019 Women's Twenty20 Cup.

In 2021, after playing in the Twenty20 Cup for Warwickshire, Gardner went on loan to Essex for the Women's London Championship in order to play 50-over cricket. She re-joined former side Northamptonshire ahead of the 2023 Women's Twenty20 Cup. She took six wickets in eight matches for the side that season.

Gardner was also part of Loughborough Lightning's squad in the Women's Cricket Super League in 2018 and 2019. She played one match in 2018, but did not bat or bowl. She played three matches in 2019, including the semi-final, and took two wickets.

In 2020, Gardner played for Sunrisers in the Rachael Heyhoe Flint Trophy. She appeared in all 6 matches, and was her side's leading run-scorer and joint leading wicket-taker, with 193 runs and 7 wickets. She scored one half-century, 54, in a losing cause against Western Storm. In December 2020, it was announced that Gardner was one of the 41 female cricketers that had signed a full-time domestic contract. Gardner played 11 matches for the side in 2021, across the Rachael Heyhoe Flint Trophy and the Charlotte Edwards Cup, taking two wickets and with a top score of 42, made off 30 balls against Northern Diamonds. She also played nine matches in Oval Invincibles' victorious campaign in The Hundred. Ahead of the 2022 season, Gardner remodelled her bowling action, becoming an off break bowler, having previously bowled medium pace. She played eleven matches for Sunrisers in 2022, across the Charlotte Edwards Cup and the Rachael Heyhoe Flint Trophy, scoring 193 runs and taking eleven wickets. She moved to Southern Brave in The Hundred, but did not a play a match for her new side.

In 2023, she played 15 matches for Sunrisers, across the Rachael Heyhoe Flint Trophy and the Charlotte Edwards Cup, with a top score of 37*. She also played seven matches for Trent Rockets in The Hundred, scoring 57 runs. In 2024, she played 26 matches for Sunrisers, across the Rachael Heyhoe Flint Trophy and the Charlotte Edwards Cup, scoring two half-centuries.

In October 2024, she signed for Essex Women ahead of the 2025 women's domestic cricket restructure.
