= Trevor Griffin (cricket coach) =

English cricket coach

Cricket information
- Role: Coach

Head coaching information
- Years: Team
- 2017–2019: Western Storm
- 2019/20–2022/23: Sydney Thunder
- 2020–2021: Sunrisers
- 2021–2022: London Spirit
- 2022–2024: Western Storm
- 2025: Somerset

Trevor Griffin is an English cricket coach and former club cricketer. He was most recently the head coach of Somerset women's cricket team, and has previously been head coach of Western Storm, London Spirit, Sydney Thunder and Sunrisers.

== Career ==
Griffin worked for Nationwide Building Society until 2007. He played club cricket for Ottery St Mary and Whimple. Between 2007 and 2015, Griffin worked as a coach for the Devon Cricket Board, the Chance to Shine charity, and the University of Exeter. He was also the head coach of Ottery St Mary. In 2015, he worked as a coach for Canterbury cricket team in New Zealand. He worked with cricketers including Matt Henry, Henry Nicholls, Tom Latham, Shane Watson, Mike Hussey, Amy Satterthwaite, and Lea Tahuhu. Griffin has also worked with the England women's cricket team and England Academy.

In 2016, he was appointed assistant coach of Western Storm, ahead of the inaugural season of the Women's Cricket Super League (WCSL). In 2017, he became head coach of Western Storm after head coach Caroline Foster stepped down. Storm won two editions of the WCSL whilst Griffin was head coach, in 2017 and 2019. They also made the semi-final in 2018, and the final in 2016 when Griffin was assistant coach. Storm were the most successful team in the WCSL.

Ahead of the 2019–20 Women's Big Bash League season, Griffin was appointed head coach of Sydney Thunder. He was the WBBL's first non-Australian coach, and replaced Joanne Broadbent. Griffin had previously worked for Thunder as an assistant coach. Thunder later won the 2020–21 season.

In 2020, Griffin was appointed the head coach of the Sunrisers, one of the new women's regional cricket hubs. Sunrisers lost all six of their matches in the 2020 Rachael Heyhoe Flint Trophy. Griffin was appointed head coach of the London Spirit women's team for The Hundred; the inaugural season of The Hundred was postponed from 2020 to 2021 due to the COVID-19 pandemic.

In April 2022, it was announced that Griffin was leaving his role as head coach of Sunrisers for personal reasons. It was later announced that he would be returning to Western Storm as head coach, ahead of the 2022 Rachael Heyhoe Flint Trophy. In January 2023, Griffin was sacked as head coach of Sydney Thunder, after the team won one of their 14 matches in the 2022–23 season.

Following the restructure of English women's cricket teams ahead of the 2025 season, Griffin became the coach of Somerset. In August 2025, it was announced he would leave the role at the end of that year's season.

== Personal life ==
Griffin has been divorced, and is now married to Gemma.
