= Mady Villiers =

English cricketer (born 1998)

Personal information
- Full name: Mady Kate Villiers
- Born: 26 August 1998 (age 28); Havering, Greater London, England
- Batting: Right-handed
- Bowling: Right-arm off break
- Role: Bowler

International information
- National side: England (2019–present)
- Only Test (cap 172): 10 July 2026 v India
- ODI debut (cap 150): 7 September 2024 v Ireland
- Last ODI: 1 September 2026 v Ireland
- T20I debut (cap 49): 31 July 2019 v Australia
- Last T20I: 15 September 2024 v Ireland

Domestic team information
- Years: Team
- 2013–2024: Essex
- 2018–2019: Surrey Stars
- 2020–2024: Sunrisers
- 2021–2024: Oval Invincibles
- 2025–2026: Southern Brave
- 2025–present: Durham
- 2026–present: Manchester Super Giants

Career statistics
Competition	WT20I	WODI	WT20	WLA
Matches	17	2	114	61
Runs scored	13	27	789	890
Batting average	6.50	13.50	11.43	15.61
100s/50s	0/0	0/0	0/3	0/5
Top score	9*	14	55*	70
Balls bowled	216	60	1,575	2,441
Wickets	14	0	82	69
Bowling average	17.28	–	20.29	25.26
5 wickets in innings	0	0	0	0
10 wickets in match	0	0	0	0
Best bowling	3/10	0/49	4/3	4/36
Catches/stumpings	9/–	–/–	32/–	18/–
- Source: CricketArchive, 20 October 2023

Mady Kate Villiers (born 26 August 1998) is an English cricketer who plays for Essex, Sunrisers and Manchester Super Giants as a right-arm off break bowler. In July 2019, she was named in England's squad for the Women's Twenty20 International (WT20I) fixtures of the 2019 Women's Ashes series, making her WT20I debut for England against Australia on 31 July 2019.

== Early and personal life ==
Villiers was born on 26 August 1998 in Havering, Greater London. She attended Shenfield High School, winning several school-county cricket titles during her time there, and scored her first century off 65 balls, aged 14 in a Schools' Cup semi-final. She also played youth cricket for Bentley Cricket Club, helping its under-16 girls' team win the Essex Girls Matchplay title in 2014. Villiers is a vegan.

== Domestic career ==
Villiers began playing age group cricket for Essex in 2012 before making her first-team debut in 2013, in a County Championship match against Yorkshire. She did not bowl in the match, and made 1 run batting at number 11. She made her Twenty20 debut later that season, against Sussex, and went on to play four games in the 2013 Women's Twenty20 Cup.

2015 was a breakthrough season for Villiers, taking 8 wickets at 14.87 in the County Championship and 12 wickets at 6.66 in the Twenty20 Cup. She thereafter became a regular in Essex's side, and in 2018 was selected as part of the Surrey Stars squad for the 2018 Women's Cricket Super League. She played 11 matches in the season, taking 5 wickets at an average of 18.00. Her standout performance came in the final, when she took 3/22 to help her side win their first KSL. Villiers returned to play for the Stars the following season, where she took 5 wickets in 7 matches.

In 2020, Villiers joined the Sunrisers for the Rachael Heyhoe Flint Trophy. She played 2 games, picking up one wicket as well as scoring 64 against Southern Vipers. In 2021, she took five wickets in the Rachael Heyhoe Flint Trophy, as well as one in the Charlotte Edwards Cup. She also played for Oval Invincibles in The Hundred, scoring 51 runs and taking 6 wickets as the side won the competition. She played eleven matches for Sunrisers in 2022, across the Charlotte Edwards Cup and the Rachael Heyhoe Flint Trophy, and was the joint-second leading wicket-taker across the whole Rachael Heyhoe Flint Trophy, with 12 wickets at an average of 21.83. She also took six wickets for Oval Invincibles in The Hundred as the side won their second title.

In 2023, she was Sunrisers' leading wicket-taker in the Charlotte Edwards Cup, with 10 wickets at an average of 15.90. She also scored two half-centuries and took 12 wickets in the Rachael Heyhoe Flint Trophy. She also played seven matches for Oval Invincibles in The Hundred. In the 2026 Hundred auction Villiers joined Manchester Super Giants for £45,000.

In September 2024 Villiers signed a three-year contract with Durham to play in the new domestic county competitions from 2025.

== International career ==
Villiers was named in her first England squad for the Women's Twenty20 International series against Australia in July 2019. She made her debut in the 3rd T20I, and took 2-20 from her four overs, dismissing Alyssa Healy and Ashleigh Gardner.

In November 2019, she was named in England's squad for their series against Pakistan. She played two T20Is, and took two wickets. Villiers went on to play one match in England's 2020 ICC Women's T20 World Cup campaign in Australia, taking 1–30 against the West Indies

On 18 June 2020, Villiers was named in a squad of 24 players to begin training ahead of international women's fixtures starting in England following the COVID-19 pandemic. She played all five matches in the subsequent series against West Indies, taking 2–10 in the 2nd T20I.

In 2021, Villiers was named in the squad for England's tour of New Zealand. She played all three T20Is on the tour, taking four wickets including an international career-best of 3/10 in the final match of the series. In June 2021, Villiers was named as in England's Test squad for their one-off match against India. In December 2021, Villiers was named in England's squad for their tour to Australia to contest the Women's Ashes. In February 2022, she was named as one of two reserve players in England's team for the 2022 Women's Cricket World Cup in New Zealand.

Villiers made her One Day International debut for England against Ireland at Stormont in Belfast on 7 September 2024 registering bowling figures of 0/49 from her 10 overs and scoring 13 with the bat.

She made her Test match debut for England against India at Lord's on 10 July 2026.
