= Amara Carr =

English cricketer

Personal information
- Full name: Amara Danielle Carr
- Born: 17 April 1994 (age 32); Plymouth, Devon, England
- Batting: Right-handed
- Role: Wicket-keeper

Domestic team information
- Years: Team
- 2008–2019: Devon
- 2017–2019: → Middlesex (on loan)
- 2016–2019: Western Storm
- 2020–present: Middlesex
- 2020–2024: Sunrisers
- 2021–2022: London Spirit
- 2023: Manchester Originals
- 2024: Oval Invincibles

Career statistics
Competition	WLA	WT20
Matches	128	85
Runs scored	2,028	939
Batting average	19.31	18.05
100s/50s	1/8	0/2
Top score	105	52
Catches/stumpings	68/44	20/37
- Source: CricketArchive, 19 October 2024

Amara Danielle Carr (born 17 April 1994) is an English cricketer who currently plays for Middlesex. She plays as a wicket-keeper and right-handed batter. She has previously played for Devon, Sunrisers, London Spirit and Manchester Originals.

== Early life ==
Carr was born on 17 April 1994 in Plymouth, Devon. She attended the University of Exeter, where she graduated with a degree in sports science. In 2016, she won the ECB's Young Coach of the Year award.

== Domestic career ==
Carr made her county debut for Devon in 2008, at the age of 14, in which she scored 13 runs in a victory over Cornwall. Carr soon became a regular for Devon over the following years, and was part of the England Development Squad that won the Women's European Cricket Championship in 2010. She achieved her maiden List A century in 2019, scoring 105 for Devon against Middlesex.

From 2017 to 2019, Carr played in the Women's Twenty20 Cup for Middlesex, and was part of their side that won the tournament in 2018. In February 2020, it was announced that Carr was joining Middlesex from Devon in both formats. She scored 45 runs in four matches for the side in the 2021 Women's Twenty20 Cup.

Carr was also part of the Western Storm squad for every season of the Women's Cricket Super League, from 2016 to 2019, but did not play a match. In 2020, she joined Sunrisers for the Rachael Heyhoe Flint Trophy, and was subsequently named as captain of the side. Whilst her side finished bottom of the South Group, Carr hit 99 in a match against South East Stars. In December 2020, it was announced that Carr was one of the 41 female cricketers that had signed a full-time domestic contract. She played eight matches for the side in 2021, across the Rachael Heyhoe Flint Trophy and the Charlotte Edwards Cup, with a top score of 25, missing parts of the season due to injury. She also played five matches for London Spirit in The Hundred, scoring 19 runs and making two stumpings. She played six matches for Sunrisers in 2022, across the Charlotte Edwards Cup and the Rachael Heyhoe Flint Trophy, scoring 129 runs. She also played one match for London Spirit in The Hundred.

In 2023, she played 19 matches for Sunrisers, across the Rachael Heyhoe Flint Trophy and the Charlotte Edwards Cup, scoring one half-century and making 14 dismissals. She also played one match for Manchester Originals in The Hundred. In 2024, she played 26 matches for Sunrisers, across the Rachael Heyhoe Flint Trophy and the Charlotte Edwards Cup, making 26 dismissals.

In October 2024, she signed for Essex Women ahead of the 2025 women's domestic cricket restructure.
