= Naomi Dattani =

English cricketer (born 1994)

Personal information
- Full name: Naomi Dilip Dattani
- Born: 28 April 1994 (age 32); Ealing, Greater London, England
- Batting: Left-handed
- Bowling: Left-arm medium
- Role: All-rounder

Domestic team information
- Years: Team
- 2008–2023: Middlesex
- 2016: Surrey Stars
- 2018–2019: Western Storm
- 2020–2022: Sunrisers
- 2021–2022: London Spirit
- 2023–2024: North West Thunder
- 2024: → Southern Vipers (on loan)
- 2023: Trent Rockets
- 2024: Southern Brave
- 2025–present: Western Australia
- 2025–present: Hampshire

Career statistics
| Competition | WLA | WT20 |
|---|---|---|
| Matches | 112 | 136 |
| Runs scored | 1,480 | 1,475 |
| Batting average | 16.26 | 16.76 |
| 100s/50s | 0/4 | 0/6 |
| Top score | 82 | 71 |
| Balls bowled | 3,328 | 1,311 |
| Wickets | 78 | 57 |
| Bowling average | 37.75 | 28.10 |
| 5 wickets in innings | 1 | 0 |
| 10 wickets in match | 0 | 0 |
| Best bowling | 5/51 | 3/9 |
| Catches/stumpings | 49/– | 36/– |
- Source: CricketArchive, 26 April 2024

Naomi Dilip Dattani (born 28 April 1994) is an English professional cricketer who plays for Hampshire and Western Australia. She has previously played for Surrey Stars, Western Storm, Sunrisers, London Spirit, Trent Rockets, Middlesex Women, North West Thunder and Southern Brave. In 2020, she was one of 25 players awarded regional retainer contracts by the England and Wales Cricket Board. She started playing cricket at the age of 10 for a local cricket club, Perivale Phoenicians Cricket Club.

== Life and career ==
Dattani was born in Ealing, Greater London, on 28 April 1994. She attended Greenford High School in Ealing, and then studied Sports Science at Loughborough University. She started playing cricket at the age of 10 with her brother at home, and then joined a local boys' team. She progressed through age-group cricket with Middlesex, playing at Under-13, Under-15 and Under-17 level. She made her debut for the first team in May 2008, aged 14. By 2015, from being a regular in the team, she found herself on the fringes. After completing university, she spent the English winter in Australia, where she played for the women's team at Prahran Cricket Club, which she credits with improving her game. She described her playing career up to 2015 as being "in the shadow", but the improvements led to her being added to the Surrey Stars squad for the Women's Cricket Super League in 2016, and selection for the England Women's Academy.

Dattani was named as Middlesex's captain in fifty-over cricket in 2017, and remained part of the Surrey Stars squad. She moved to the Western Storm for the 2018 Super League, and played in every match for them that season. She was ever-present again the following season as Western Storm won the Super League. In early 2020, Dattani was signed by London Spirit for The Hundred, though the tournament was postponed due to the COVID-19 pandemic. In June 2020, she was one of 25 domestic female players awarded retainer contracts, which are planned to later become full-time professional contracts. In July, she signed for the new regional team Sunrisers and played all six matches for them in the Rachael Heyhoe Flint Trophy, scoring 125 runs at an average of 20.83. In 2021, she was ever-present for Sunrisers across the Rachael Heyhoe Flint Trophy and the 2021 Charlotte Edwards Cup, scoring one half-century, 65 against Lightning. She also played seven matches for London Spirit in The Hundred, scoring 72 runs at an average of 10.28 and taking two wickets. In 2022, she was Sunrisers' leading run-scorer in the Charlotte Edwards Cup, scoring 157 runs including two half-centuries. She also captained the side in one match, against Lightning in the Rachael Heyhoe Flint Trophy. At the end of the 2022 season, it was announced that Dattani had joined North West Thunder. In 2023, she was North West Thunder's second-highest run-scorer in the Rachael Heyhoe Flint Trophy, with 263 runs including a high score of 82.

On 3 September 2024, it was announced that she had been loaned to Southern Vipers from North West Thunder for the remainder of the season.
