= Sunrisers (women's cricket) =

English women's cricket team

Team information
- Colours: Black and red
- Established: 2020
- Home ground: County Ground, Chelmsford; County Ground, Northampton; Lord's; Brunton Memorial Ground

History
- RHFT wins: 0
- CEC wins: 0
- Official website: Sunrisers Cricket
Playing kit

Sunrisers were a women's cricket team that represented the London and East region, one of eight regional hubs in English domestic women's cricket. They played their home matches at various grounds, including the County Cricket Ground, Chelmsford. They were captained by Grace Scrivens and coached by Andy Tennant. The team were partnered with Middlesex, Essex, Northamptonshire, Hertfordshire, Cambridgeshire, Suffolk, Norfolk, Bedfordshire and Huntingdonshire, as well as Marylebone Cricket Club.

Sunrisers won their first trophy in 2024, winning the Rachael Heyhoe Flint Trophy. At the end of the 2024 season, following reforms to the structure of women's domestic cricket, the team was effectively replaced by a professionalised Essex team.

== History ==
In 2020, women's cricket in England was restructured, creating eight new 'regional hub' teams, with the intention of playing both 50-over and 20-over cricket. Sunrisers were one of the sides created under this structure, representing the London and East region, Middlesex, Essex, Northamptonshire, Hertfordshire, Cambridgeshire, Suffolk, Norfolk, Bedfordshire and Huntingdonshire, as well as Marylebone Cricket Club. The side was to be captained by Amara Carr and coached by Trevor Griffin. Due to the COVID-19 pandemic, the 2020 season was truncated, and only 50-over cricket was played, in the Rachael Heyhoe Flint Trophy. Sunrisers finished bottom of the South Group in the competition, losing all six of their matches. At the end of the season, five Sunrisers players were given full-time domestic contracts, the first of their kind in England: Amara Carr, Naomi Dattani, Cordelia Griffith, Jo Gardner and Kelly Castle.

The following season, 2021, Sunrisers competed in both the Rachael Heyhoe Flint Trophy and the newly-formed Twenty20 competition, the Charlotte Edwards Cup. The side again lost all of their matches in the Rachael Heyhoe Flint Trophy, finishing bottom of the eight-team group. For the Charlotte Edwards Cup, Kelly Castle was named as captain of the side. In the first match of the tournament, Sunrisers recorded their first ever victory, beating Western Storm by 7 wickets. However, they did not win another match in the tournament and finished bottom of their group, although they did tie their home match against North West Thunder.

Ahead of the 2022 season, it was announced that Castle was becoming captain of the side in all formats, and that Trevor Griffin was stepping down as Head Coach for personal reasons. Griffin was later replaced by Laura Marsh, taking on the Head Coach role on an interim basis for the 2022 season. The side finished bottom of their Charlotte Edwards Cup group, losing all six of their matches. The side also finished bottom of the Rachael Heyhoe Flint Trophy group, losing all of their completed matches. Sunrisers all-rounder Grace Scrivens was the joint-leading wicket-taker in the competition, with 13 wickets, and the third-highest run-scorer, with 297 runs. At the end of the season, it was announced that Andy Tennant had been appointed as the permanent Head Coach of the side.

In June 2023, it was announced that Kelly Castle had stepped down as captain of the side, being replaced by overseas player Dane van Niekerk. After van Niekerk's spell with the side ended in September 2023, Grace Scrivens took over the captaincy. That season, the side finished bottom of the group in the Charlotte Edwards Cup, but won their first matches in the Rachael Heyhoe Flint Trophy, including a late season winning run to finish fourth in the table. Ahead of the 2024 season, Scrivens was confirmed as captain in the Rachael Heyhoe Flint Trophy, with van Niekerk captaining in the Charlotte Edwards Cup. van Niekerk was later ruled out of her stint with the club, meaning that Scrivens captained the side in both formats. The side finished bottom of the group in the Charlotte Edwards Cup. In the Rachael Heyhoe Flint Trophy, the side finished fourth in the group stage, going on to defeat Northern Diamonds in the semi-finals. In the final they played South East Stars, and defeated them by 27 runs (DLS) to win their first trophy.

2024 was the side's final season, with reforms to the structure of domestic cricket in England meaning that the side was effectively replaced by a professionalised Essex team.

== Home grounds ==
Venue	Games hosted by season					
Venue	20	21	22	23	24	Total
County Ground, Chelmsford	3	3	4	5	5	20
Fenner's	–	2	–	–	–	2
County Ground, Northampton	–	1	2	2	2	7
Merchant Taylors' School	–	1	–	–	–	1
Lord's	–	–	–	1	2	3
Brunton Memorial Ground	–	–	–	2	3	5

== Players ==
=== Overseas players ===
- Saskia Horley – Scotland (2023) (Note: Horley qualified as an overseas player as she was born and raised in Australia.)
- Dane van Niekerk – South Africa (2023)
- Nicola Hancock – Australia (2024)

== Seasons ==
=== Rachael Heyhoe Flint Trophy ===
Season	Final standing	League standings									Notes
Season	Final standing	P	W	L	T	NR	BP	Pts	NRR	Pos	Notes
2020	Group stage	6	0	6	0	0	0	0	−1.365	4th	DNQ
2021	Group stage	7	0	7	0	0	0	0	−1.598	8th	DNQ
2022	Group stage	7	0	6	0	1	0	2	−1.046	8th	DNQ
2023	Group stage	14	6	5	0	3	2	32	−0.006	4th	DNQ
2024	Champions	14	7	6	0	1	4	34	−0.122	4th	Won against South East Stars in the final

=== Charlotte Edwards Cup ===
Season	Final standing	League standings									Notes
Season	Final standing	P	W	L	T	NR	BP	Pts	NRR	Pos	Notes
2021	Group stages	6	1	4	1	0	0	6	–0.871	4th	DNQ
2022	Group stages	6	0	6	0	0	0	0	–1.287	4th	DNQ
2023	Group stages	7	0	7	0	0	0	0	–1.717	8th	DNQ
2024	Group stages	10	2	8	0	0	0	8	–1.073	8th	DNQ

== Statistics ==
=== Rachael Heyhoe Flint Trophy ===
Rachael Heyhoe Flint Trophy – summary of results
Year	Played	Wins	Losses	Tied	NR	Win %
2020	6	0	6	0	0	0.00
2021	7	0	7	0	0	0.00
2022	7	0	6	0	1	0.00
2023	14	6	5	0	3	42.86
2024	16	9	6	0	1	56.25
Total	50	15	30	0	5	30.00

- Abandoned matches are counted as NR (no result)
- Win or loss by super over or boundary count are counted as tied.

Rachael Heyhoe Flint Trophy – teamwise result summary
Opposition	Mat	Won	Lost	Tied	NR	Win %
Central Sparks	6	2	2	0	2	33.33
Northern Diamonds	7	3	4	0	0	42.86
North West Thunder	6	1	2	0	3	16.67
Southern Vipers	8	4	4	0	0	50.00
South East Stars	9	1	8	0	0	11.11
The Blaze	6	2	4	0	0	33.33
Western Storm	8	2	6	0	0	25.00

=== Charlotte Edwards Cup ===
Charlotte Edwards Cup - summary of results
Year	Played	Wins	Losses	Tied	NR	Win %
2021	6	1	4	1	0	16.67
2022	6	0	6	0	0	0.00
2023	7	0	7	0	0	0.00
2024	10	2	8	0	0	20.00
Total	29	3	25	1	0	10.34

- Abandoned matches are counted as NR (no result)
- Win or loss by super over or boundary count are counted as tied.

Charlotte Edwards Cup - teamwise result summary
Opposition	Mat	Won	Lost	Tied	NR	Win %
Central Sparks	4	0	4	0	0	0.00
Northern Diamonds	4	1	3	0	0	25.00
North West Thunder	4	0	3	1	0	0.00
South East Stars	5	0	5	0	0	0.00
Southern Vipers	3	1	2	0	0	33.33
The Blaze	2	0	2	0	0	0.00
Western Storm	7	1	6	0	0	14.28

== Records ==
=== Rachael Heyhoe Flint Trophy ===
- Highest team total: 308/6, v Southern Vipers on 12 September 2021.
- Lowest (completed) team total: 53 v Northern Diamonds on 5 June 2021.
- Highest individual score: 118*, Grace Scrivens v Central Sparks on 1 May 2024.
- Best individual bowling analysis: 5/25, Sophie Munro v North West Thunder on 30 June 2024.
- Most runs: 1,546 runs in 46 matches, Grace Scrivens.
- Most wickets: 48 wickets in 37 matches, Mady Villiers.

=== Charlotte Edwards Cup ===
- Highest team total: 160/5, v Western Storm on 18 May 2022.
- Lowest (completed) team total: 101/7 v Northern Diamonds on 25 August 2021.
- Highest individual score: 79*, Jo Gardner v Southern Vipers on 24 May 2024.
- Best individual bowling analysis: 4/23, Sophie Munro v Western Storm on 19 June 2024.
- Most runs: 574 runs in 28 matches, Grace Scrivens.
- Most wickets: 27 wickets in 24 matches, Mady Villiers.

== Honours ==
- Rachael Heyhoe Flint Trophy:
  - Champions (1) – 2024

== See also ==
- Bedfordshire Women cricket team
- Cambridgeshire Women cricket team
- Essex Women cricket team
- Hertfordshire Women cricket team
- Huntingdonshire Women cricket team
- Middlesex Women cricket team
- Norfolk Women cricket team
- Northamptonshire Women cricket team
- Suffolk Women cricket team
