= 2023 The Blaze (women's cricket) season =

English cricket season

The Blaze
2023 season
- Coach: Chris Guest
- Captain: Kirstie Gordon
- Overseas player: (South Africa) Nadine de Klerk (South Africa) Lizelle Lee
- RHFT: Runners-up
- CEC: Runners-up
- Most runs: RHFT: Tammy Beaumont (317); CEC: Georgie Boyce (200)
- Most wickets: RHFT: Grace Ballinger (18); CEC: Nadine de Klerk (15)
- Most catches: RHFT: Marie Kelly (9); CEC: Marie Kelly (5)
- Most wicket-keeping dismissals: RHFT: Sarah Bryce (17); CEC: Sarah Bryce (1)

The 2023 season saw The Blaze compete in the 50 over Rachael Heyhoe Flint Trophy and the Twenty20 Charlotte Edwards Cup. The season was the first since their rebrand as The Blaze, having previously been known as Lightning, with the team also primarily based at Trent Bridge, having previously been based at Loughborough University. The side were runners-up in both competitions. In the Charlotte Edwards Cup, the side finished top of the group stage, winning all seven of their matches, but lost to Southern Vipers in the final. In the Rachael Heyhoe Flint Trophy, the side finished second in the group stage before beating South East Stars in the play-off, but again lost in the final to Southern Vipers.

The side was captained by Kirstie Gordon and coached by Chris Guest. They played two home matches apiece at Trent Bridge, Grace Road, John Fretwell Sporting Complex and Haslegrave Ground, as well as one apiece at the County Ground, Derby and Queen's Park.

== Squad ==
=== Departures ===
On 18 April 2023, it was confirmed that Bethan Ellis had left the side, joining Central Sparks. Ahead of the 2023 season, it was confirmed that Katie Midwood, Ilenia Sims, Alicia Presland and Rhiannon Knowling-Davies were no longer in the side's full squad.

=== Arrivals ===
On 22 November 2022, it was confirmed that Cassidy McCarthy had joined the side on a retainer contract. On 20 February 2023, The Blaze announced the signing of England players Nat Sciver-Brunt and Sarah Glenn from Northern Diamonds and Central Sparks, respectively. On 23 March 2023, it was announced that the side had signed Nadine de Klerk as an overseas player. In September 2023, Lizelle Lee signed as an overseas player for the side's remaining Rachael Heyhoe Flint Trophy matches, replacing Nadine de Klerk. In September 2023, Rhiannon Knowling-Davies returned to the full squad, first being named in a matchday squad on 9 September 2023.

=== Personnel and contract changes ===
On 16 September 2022, it was announced that Lightning would be moving their regional base from Loughborough University to Nottinghamshire County Cricket Club, and that the name and branding of the team would change. On 11 November 2022, it was announced that the team would now be known as The Blaze. On 22 November 2022, The Blaze announced the players who had signed professional contracts for the upcoming season, with Georgie Boyce and Sophie Munro signing their first such contracts with the side. On 1 February 2023, The Blaze announced a further three players who had been awarded professional contracts with the side, with Grace Ballinger, Teresa Graves and Josie Groves all signing their first such contracts. In April 2023, it was announced that Kirstie Gordon would be the side's new captain, replacing Kathryn Bryce.

=== Squad list ===
- Age given is at the start of The Blaze's first match of the season (22 April 2023).

Name	Nationality	Birth date	Batting Style	Bowling Style	Notes
Batters
Georgie Boyce	England	4 October 1998 (aged 24)	Right-handed	Right-arm medium	
Bethany Harmer	England	30 October 2000 (aged 22)	Right-handed	Right-arm off break	
Marie Kelly	England	9 February 1996 (aged 27)	Right-handed	Right-arm off break	
Lizelle Lee	South Africa	2 April 1992 (aged 31)	Right-handed	Right-arm medium	Overseas player; September 2023
All-rounders
Kathryn Bryce	Scotland	17 November 1997 (aged 25)	Right-handed	Right-arm medium	
Nadine de Klerk	South Africa	16 January 2000 (aged 23)	Right-handed	Right-arm medium	Overseas player; April to July 2023
Teresa Graves	England	10 October 1998 (aged 24)	Right-handed	Right-arm medium	
Nat Sciver-Brunt	England	20 August 1992 (aged 30)	Right-handed	Right-arm medium	
Wicket-keepers
Tammy Beaumont	England	11 March 1991 (aged 32)	Right-handed	—	
Sarah Bryce	Scotland	8 January 2000 (aged 23)	Right-handed	—	
Ella Claridge	England	28 September 2002 (aged 20)	Right-handed	—	
Michaela Kirk	South Africa	30 June 1999 (aged 23)	Right-handed	Right-arm off break	
Bowlers
Grace Ballinger	England	3 April 2002 (aged 21)	Left-handed	Left-arm medium	
Sarah Glenn	England	27 August 1999 (aged 23)	Right-handed	Right-arm leg break	
Kirstie Gordon	England	20 October 1997 (aged 25)	Right-handed	Slow left-arm orthodox	Captain
Josie Groves	England	5 September 2004 (aged 18)	Right-handed	Right-arm leg break	
Lucy Higham	England	17 October 1997 (aged 25)	Right-handed	Right-arm off break	
Rhiannon Knowling-Davies	England	Unknown	Right-handed	Right-arm medium	Joined September 2023
Cassidy McCarthy	England	23 July 2002 (aged 20)	Right-handed	Right-arm medium	
Sophie Munro	England	31 August 2001 (aged 21)	Right-handed	Right-arm medium	

== Rachael Heyhoe Flint Trophy ==
=== Season standings ===
Pos	Team	Pld	W	L	T	NR	BP	Pts	NRR
1	Southern Vipers (Q)	14	7	4	1	2	4	38	0.457
2	The Blaze (Q)	14	7	4	0	3	4	38	0.173
3	South East Stars (Q)	14	7	6	0	1	6	36	0.583
4	Sunrisers	14	6	5	0	3	2	32	−0.006
5	Central Sparks	14	6	5	1	2	1	31	−0.233
6	Northern Diamonds	14	6	7	0	1	4	30	−0.034
7	North West Thunder	14	3	5	2	4	2	26	−0.274
8	Western Storm	14	2	8	0	4	0	16	−1.068

Source: England and Wales Cricket Board

advanced to the final advanced to the play-off

=== Fixtures ===
22 April 2023
10:30
Scorecard

The Blaze; 212 (46.4 overs)	v	Central Sparks; 153 (48.2 overs)
Tammy Beaumont 60 (77); Georgia Davis 3/33 (9 overs)		Katie George 31 (37); Lucy Higham 5/19 (10 overs)

The Blaze won by 59 runs
Trent Bridge, Nottingham
Umpires: Sarah Bartlett and Sue Redfern

- The Blaze won the toss and elected to bat.
- Points: The Blaze 5, Central Sparks 0

29 April 2023
10:30
Scorecard

Sunrisers; 159 (46 overs)	v	The Blaze; 160/7 (35.2 overs)
Cordelia Griffith 43 (65); Sarah Glenn 4/22 (10 overs)		Tammy Beaumont 64 (75); Kate Coppack 3/24 (6 overs)

The Blaze won by 3 wickets
County Ground, Chelmsford
Umpires: Sarah Bartlett and Anthony Harris

- Sunrisers won the toss and elected to bat.
- Points: The Blaze 5, Sunrisers 0

1 May 2023
10:30
Scorecard

The Blaze	v	North West Thunder

Match abandoned
John Fretwell Sporting Complex, Nettleworth

- No toss.
- No play was possible due to rain.
- Points: The Blaze 2, North West Thunder 2

6 May 2023
10:30
Scorecard

Northern Diamonds; 62 (18.1 overs)	v	The Blaze; 63/6 (18.5 overs)
Bess Heath 9 (15); Nadine de Klerk 7/33 (9.1 overs)		Marie Kelly 15 (18); Chloe Tyron 4/16 (7.5 overs)

The Blaze won by 4 wickets
Riverside Ground, Chester-le-Street
Umpires: Jasmine Naeem and Neil Pratt

- The Blaze won the toss and elected to field.
- Points: The Blaze 5, Northern Diamonds 0

10 May 2023
10:30
Scorecard

The Blaze; 209/9 (50 overs)	v	Western Storm; 23/0 (5 overs)
Nadine de Klerk 43 (62); Chloe Skelton 2/23 (7 overs)		Alex Griffiths 14* (25)

No result
Grace Road, Leicester
Umpires: Anna Harris and Billy Taylor

- Western Storm won the toss and elected to field.
- No further play was possible due to rain.
- Points: The Blaze 2, Western Storm 2

2 July 2023
10:30
Scorecard

The Blaze; 245 (49.5 overs)	v	Western Storm; 239/7 (50 overs)
Marie Kelly 54 (74); Nicole Harvey 3/32 (10 overs)		Alex Griffiths 67 (118); Teresa Graves 2/28 (6 overs)

The Blaze won by 6 runs
County Ground, Bristol
Umpires: Hassan Adnan and Rose Dovey

- Western Storm won the toss and elected to field.
- Points: The Blaze 4, Western Storm 0

7 July 2023
10:30
Scorecard

Northern Diamonds; 185 (50 overs)	v	The Blaze; 189/1 (24.5 overs)
Lauren Winfield-Hill 56 (58); Sophie Munro 3/35 (10 overs)		Tammy Beaumont 83* (62); Katie Levick 1/40 (6 overs)

The Blaze won by 9 wickets
Queen's Park, Chesterfield
Umpires: Fiona Richards and James Middlebrook

- Northern Diamonds won the toss and elected to bat.
- Points: The Blaze 5, Northern Diamonds 0

11 July 2023
10:30
Scorecard

Southern Vipers; 259/7 (50 overs)	v	The Blaze; 260/6 (48.2 overs)
Georgia Adams 94* (104); Nadine de Klerk 3/48 (10 overs)		Marie Kelly 61 (81); Linsey Smith 2/37 (10 overs)

The Blaze won by 4 wickets
Newclose County Cricket Ground, Newport
Umpires: Julia Jarvis and Rose Dovey

- The Blaze won the toss and elected to field.
- Points: The Blaze 4, Southern Vipers 0

17 July 2023
10:30
Scorecard

The Blaze; 159 (46.2 overs)	v	South East Stars; 161/8 (34.3 overs)
Teresa Graves 56 (96); Freya Davies 3/28 (9 overs)		Tazmin Brits 85 (63); Grace Ballinger 3/26 (8 overs)

South East Stars won by 2 wickets (DLS method)
John Fretwell Sporting Complex, Nettleworth
Umpires: Grace Bambury and Chris Watts

- The Blaze won the toss and elected to bat.
- Match reduced to 48 overs per side due to rain; South East Stars target was 159.
- Points: South East Stars 5, The Blaze 0

22 July 2023
10:30
Scorecard

North West Thunder	v	The Blaze

Match abandoned
Sedbergh School, Sedbergh
Umpires: Amy Clark and Peter Hartley

- No toss.
- No play was possible due to rain.
- Points: North West Thunder 2, The Blaze 2

5 September 2023
10:30
Scorecard

Central Sparks; 189 (49.5 overs)	v	The Blaze; 193/7 (45.1 overs)
Bethan Ellis 53 (97); Josie Groves 3/39 (10 overs)		Nat Sciver-Brunt 66* (71); Georgia Davis 2/28 (10 overs)

The Blaze won by 3 wickets
Edgbaston Cricket Ground, Birmingham
Umpires: Paul Baldwin and Rose Dovey

- Central Sparks won the toss and elected to bat.
- Points: The Blaze 4, Central Sparks 0

10 September 2023
10:30
Scorecard

South East Stars; 278 (50 overs)	v	The Blaze; 171 (38 overs)
Alice Davidson-Richards 101 (128); Grace Ballinger 4/54 (10 overs)		Kirstie Gordon 40 (39); Danielle Gregory 3/32 (7 overs)

South East Stars won by 107 runs
County Ground, Beckenham
Umpires: Grace Bambury and Surendiran Shanmugam

- South East Stars won the toss and elected to bat.
- Points: South East Stars 5, The Blaze 0

13 September 2023
10:30
Scorecard

Sunrisers; 295/5 (50 overs)	v	The Blaze; 265 (48.1 overs)
Grace Scrivens 107 (136); Teresa Graves 2/25 (6 overs)		Georgie Boyce 104 (126); Eva Gray 4/31 (10 overs)

Sunrisers won by 30 runs
Haslegrave Ground, Loughborough
Umpires: Anthony Harris and Hassan Adnan

- The Blaze won the toss and elected to field.
- Points: Sunrisers 4, The Blaze 0

16 September 2023
10:30
Scorecard

Southern Vipers; 288 (49.5 overs)	v	The Blaze; 162 (39.1 overs)
Maia Bouchier 64 (68); Grace Ballinger 4/58 (9.5 overs)		Marie Kelly 56 (62); Mary Taylor 3/15 (7 overs)

Southern Vipers won by 126 runs
Haslegrave Ground, Loughborough
Umpires: Anthony Harris and Jasmine Naeem

- The Blaze won the toss and elected to field.
- Points: Southern Vipers 5, The Blaze 0

==== Play-off ====
21 September 2023
10:30
Scorecard

South East Stars; 148 (43.5 overs)	v	The Blaze; 52/2 (8.4 overs)
Ryana MacDonald-Gay 26 (48); Marie Kelly 2/7 (3 overs)		Sarah Bryce 34* (26); Alexa Stonehouse 1/11 (2 overs)

The Blaze won by 8 wickets (DLS method)
County Ground, Beckenham
Umpires: Grace Bambury and James Tredwell

- South East Stars won the toss and elected to bat.
- The Blaze innings reduced to 10 overs due to rain; target was 52.

==== Final ====
24 September 2023
10:30
Scorecard

The Blaze; 200/8 (48 overs)	v	Southern Vipers; 203/5 (40.2 overs)
Tammy Beaumont 76 (104); Linsey Smith 3/30 (10 overs)		Emily Windsor 57* (53); Josie Groves 3/39 (8 overs)

Southern Vipers won by 5 wickets
County Ground, Northampton
Umpires: Ben Peverall and Rose Dovey

- Southern Vipers won the toss and elected to field.
- Match reduced to 48 overs per side due to rain.

=== Tournament statistics ===
==== Batting ====
Player	Matches	Innings	Runs	Average	High score	100s	50s
Tammy Beaumont	7	7	317	52.83	83*	0	4
Georgie Boyce	14	13	253	21.08	104	1	0
Sarah Bryce	13	13	241	21.90	53*	0	2
Marie Kelly	12	12	239	19.91	61	0	3

Source: ESPN Cricinfo Qualification: 200 runs.

==== Bowling ====
Player	Matches	Overs	Wickets	Average	Economy	BBI	5wi
Grace Ballinger	13	100.4	18	23.44	4.19	4/54	0
Kirstie Gordon	13	104.5	14	30.50	4.07	3/54	0
Nadine de Klerk	7	53.3	13	16.30	3.96	7/33	1
Kathryn Bryce	13	89.0	13	28.61	4.17	2/17	0
Lucy Higham	14	81.5	13	29.23	464	5/19	1
Josie Groves	6	45.0	12	20.50	5.46	3/39	0

Source: ESPN Cricinfo Qualification: 10 wickets.

== Charlotte Edwards Cup ==
=== Season standings ===
Pos	Team	Pld	W	L	T	NR	BP	Pts	NRR
1	The Blaze (Q)	7	7	0	0	0	4	32	1.765
2	Southern Vipers (Q)	7	5	2	0	0	2	22	0.940
3	North West Thunder (Q)	7	4	3	0	0	2	18	0.331
4	Northern Diamonds	7	4	3	0	0	1	17	−0.129
5	South East Stars	7	3	4	0	0	0	12	−0.096
6	Western Storm	7	3	4	0	0	0	12	−0.512
7	Central Sparks	7	2	5	0	0	0	8	−0.558
8	Sunrisers	7	0	7	0	0	0	0	−1.717

Source: England and Wales Cricket Board

advanced to final advanced to the semi-final

=== Fixtures ===
20 May 2023
14:30 BST
Scorecard

South East Stars; 160/8 (20 overs)	v	The Blaze; 161/5 (19.2 overs)
Phoebe Franklin 53 (43); Nadine de Klerk 3/21 (3 overs)		Georgie Boyce 63* (38); Paige Scholfield 2/26 (4 overs)

The Blaze won by 5 wickets
County Ground, Beckenham
Umpires: Chris Watts and Rose Dovey

- The Blaze won the toss and elected to field.
- Points: The Blaze 4, South East Stars 0

25 May 2023
16:30 BST
Scorecard

North West Thunder; 117/6 (20 overs)	v	The Blaze; 120/7 (15.2 overs)
Liberty Heap 26 (32); Grace Ballinger 2/23 (4 overs)		Tammy Beaumont 38 (21); Sophie Ecclestone 2/18 (4 overs)

The Blaze won by 3 wickets
Old Trafford Cricket Ground, Manchester
Umpires: Naeem Ashraf and Waseem Mohammed

- The Blaze won the toss and elected to field.
- Points: The Blaze 5, North West Thunder 0

26 May 2023
13:00 BST
Scorecard

The Blaze; 212/5 (20 overs)	v	Central Sparks; 156/6 (20 overs)
Nat Sciver-Brunt 96* (50); Issy Wong 2/39 (4 overs)		Amy Jones 55 (39); Nadine de Klerk 2/26 (4 overs)

The Blaze won by 56 runs
Grace Road, Leicester
Umpires: Rose Dovey and Jack Shantry

- Central Sparks won the toss and elected to field.
- Points: The Blaze 5, Central Sparks 0

29 May 2023
11:00 BST
Scorecard

Southern Vipers; 118 (19.3 overs)	v	The Blaze; 119/5 (19.4 overs)
Georgia Adams 31 (27); Nadine de Klerk 2/10 (3.3 overs)		Tammy Beaumont 49* (40); Linsey Smith 2/19 (4 overs)

The Blaze won by 5 wickets
County Ground, Derby
Umpires: Hassan Adnan and Simon Widdup

- The Blaze won the toss and elected to field.
- Points: The Blaze 4, Southern Vipers 0

2 June 2023
14:30 BST
Scorecard

Northern Diamonds; 129/7 (20 overs)	v	The Blaze; 133/4 (15.4 overs)
Lauren Winfield-Hill 40 (47); Nadine de Klerk 3/31 (4 overs)		Sarah Bryce 67* (43); Abigail Glen 2/23 (3 overs)

The Blaze won by 6 wickets
Riverside Ground, Chester-le-Street
Umpires: Joanne Ibbotson and Simon Widdup

- Northern Diamonds won the toss and elected to bat.
- Points: The Blaze 5, Northern Diamonds 0

4 June 2023
11:00 BST
Scorecard

The Blaze; 198/6 (20 overs)	v	Sunrisers; 114 (20 overs)
Nat Sciver-Brunt 58 (30); Eva Gray 2/29 (3 overs)		Grace Scrivens 20 (26); Sarah Glenn 2/9 (3 overs)

The Blaze won by 84 runs
Trent Bridge, Nottingham
Umpires: Anthony Harris and James Tredwell

- The Blaze won the toss and elected to bat.
- Points: The Blaze 5, Sunrisers 0

7 June 2023
14:30 BST
Scorecard

Western Storm; 134/7 (20 overs)	v	The Blaze; 137/3 (18.4 overs)
Emma Corney 23 (32); Kathryn Bryce 2/17 (4 overs)		Kathryn Bryce 54* (37); Claire Nicholas 2/24 (4 overs)

The Blaze won by 7 wickets
Sophia Gardens, Cardiff
Umpires: Anna Harris and Ben Peverall

- The Blaze won the toss and elected to field.
- Points: The Blaze 4, Western Storm 0

==== Final ====
10 & 11 June 2023
16:00 BST
Scorecard

The Blaze; 114/8 (20 overs)	v	Southern Vipers; 118/3 (14.2 overs)
Marie Kelly 26* (36); Georgia Adams 2/20 (4 overs)		Danni Wyatt 50 (28); Lucy Higham 1/16 (2 overs)

Southern Vipers won by 7 wickets
New Road, Worcester
Umpires: Anna Harris and Sue Redfern
Player of the match: Anya Shrubsole (Southern Vipers)

- The Blaze won the toss and elected to bat.
- Rain interrupted The Blaze innings at 53/4 from 9.3 overs on 10 June. Play resumed on the reserve day on 11 June.

=== Tournament statistics ===
==== Batting ====
Player	Matches	Innings	Runs	Average	High score	100s	50s
Georgie Boyce	8	8	200	28.57	63*	0	1
Nat Sciver-Brunt	4	4	194	64.66	96*	0	2
Tammy Beaumont	6	6	191	38.20	49*	0	0
Sarah Bryce	8	6	115	23.00	67*	0	1
Marie Kelly	8	8	115	19.16	26*	0	0

Source: ESPN Cricinfo Qualification: 100 runs.

==== Bowling ====
Player	Matches	Overs	Wickets	Average	Economy	BBI	5wi
Nadine de Klerk	8	28.3	15	11.40	6.00	3/21	0
Sophie Munro	5	12.2	6	15.00	7.29	2/18	0
Sarah Glenn	5	18.0	6	16.00	5.33	2/9	0
Nat Sciver-Brunt	4	13.0	6	19.66	9.07	2/16	0
Grace Ballinger	8	22.0	6	27.50	7.50	2/23	0
Kirstie Gordon	7	26.0	6	28.16	6.50	3/29	0

Source: ESPN Cricinfo Qualification: 5 wickets.

== Season statistics ==
=== Batting ===
Player	Rachael Heyhoe Flint Trophy								Charlotte Edwards Cup							
Player	Matches	Innings	Runs	High score	Average	Strike rate	100s	50s	Matches	Innings	Runs	High score	Average	Strike rate	100s	50s
Grace Ballinger	13	7	21	11*	21.00	48.83	0	0	8	–	–	–	–	–	–	–
Tammy Beaumont	7	7	317	83*	52.83	85.21	0	4	6	6	191	49*	38.20	142.53	0	0
Georgie Boyce	14	13	253	104	21.08	66.57	1	0	8	8	200	63*	28.57	123.45	0	1
Kathryn Bryce	13	11	177	51	16.09	70.51	0	1	7	7	97	54*	16.16	103.19	0	0
Sarah Bryce	13	13	241	53*	21.90	69.45	0	2	8	6	115	67*	23.00	127.77	0	1
Ella Claridge	4	3	58	33	19.33	71.60	0	0	–	–	–	–	–	–	–	–
Nadine de Klerk	7	7	104	43	20.80	63.80	0	0	8	7	83	21*	20.75	115.27	0	0
Sarah Glenn	4	4	79	38	26.33	80.61	0	0	5	5	81	43*	27.00	112.50	0	0
Kirstie Gordon	13	8	118	40	29.50	57.84	0	0	7	1	3	3*	–	150.00	0	0
Teresa Graves	7	6	118	56	19.66	57.84	0	1	–	–	–	–	–	–	–	–
Josie Groves	6	4	28	13	9.33	82.35	0	0	3	–	–	–	–	–	–	–
Bethany Harmer	1	1	11	11	11.00	52.38	0	0	1	1	12	12	12.00	70.58	0	0
Lucy Higham	14	11	86	24	8.60	52.76	0	0	8	2	6	6	6.00	54.54	0	0
Marie Kelly	12	12	239	61	19.91	74.45	0	3	8	8	115	26*	19.16	100.00	0	0
Michaela Kirk	5	4	91	40	22.75	67.91	0	0	2	1	0	0	0.00	0.00	0	0
Lizelle Lee	6	6	75	40	12.50	104.16	0	0	–	–	–	–	–	–	–	–
Cassidy McCarthy	2	1	12	12	12.00	92.30	0	0	–	–	–	–	–	–	–	–
Sophie Munro	12	9	183	41	26.14	55.96	0	0	5	3	21	12*	21.00	131.25	0	0
Nat Sciver-Brunt	1	1	66	66*	–	92.95	0	1	4	4	194	96*	64.66	174.77	0	2
Source: ESPN Cricinfo

=== Bowling ===
Player	Rachael Heyhoe Flint Trophy							Charlotte Edwards Cup						
Player	Matches	Overs	Wickets	Average	Economy	BBI	5wi	Matches	Overs	Wickets	Average	Economy	BBI	5wi
Grace Ballinger	13	100.4	18	23.44	4.19	4/54	0	8	22.0	6	27.50	7.50	2/23	0
Kathryn Bryce	13	89.0	13	28.61	4.17	2/17	0	7	12.0	4	17.75	5.91	2/17	0
Nadine de Klerk	7	53.3	13	16.30	3.96	7/33	1	8	28.3	15	11.40	6.00	3/21	0
Sarah Glenn	4	19.0	5	10.00	2.63	4/22	0	5	18.0	6	16.00	5.33	2/9	0
Kirstie Gordon	13	104.5	14	30.50	4.07	3/54	0	7	26.0	6	28.16	6.50	2/29	0
Teresa Graves	7	28.5	5	31.20	5.41	2/25	0	–	–	–	–	–	–	–
Josie Groves	6	45.0	12	20.50	5.46	3/39	0	3	6.0	1	45.00	7.50	1/14	0
Lucy Higham	14	81.5	13	29.23	4.64	5/19	1	8	15.0	3	31.00	6.20	1/6	0
Marie Kelly	12	10.0	3	20.00	6.00	2/7	0	8	1.0	0	–	8.00	–	0
Cassidy McCarthy	2	14.0	2	30.50	4.35	2/17	0	–	–	–	–	–	–	–
Sophie Munro	12	35.0	8	21.75	4.97	3/35	0	5	12.2	6	15.00	7.29	2/18	0
Nat Sciver-Brunt	1	–	–	–	–	–	–	4	13.0	6	19.66	9.07	2/16	0
Source: ESPN Cricinfo

=== Fielding ===
Player	Rachael Heyhoe Flint Trophy			Charlotte Edwards Cup		
Player	Matches	Innings	Catches	Matches	Innings	Catches
Grace Ballinger	13	13	3	8	8	0
Tammy Beaumont	7	7	2	6	6	1
Georgie Boyce	14	14	4	8	8	2
Kathryn Bryce	13	13	5	7	7	2
Ella Claridge	4	4	3	–	–	–
Nadine de Klerk	7	7	2	8	8	1
Sarah Glenn	4	4	1	5	5	2
Kirstie Gordon	13	13	6	7	7	3
Teresa Graves	7	7	0	–	–	–
Josie Groves	6	6	1	3	3	0
Bethany Harmer	1	1	0	1	1	0
Lucy Higham	14	14	6	8	8	1
Marie Kelly	12	12	9	8	8	5
Michaela Kirk	5	5	4	2	2	1
Lizelle Lee	6	5	0	–	–	–
Cassidy McCarthy	2	2	0	–	–	–
Sophie Munro	12	12	3	5	5	1
Nat Sciver-Brunt	1	1	1	4	4	0
Source: ESPN Cricinfo

=== Wicket-keeping ===
Player	Rachael Heyhoe Flint Trophy				Charlotte Edwards Cup			
Player	Matches	Innings	Catches	Stumpings	Matches	Innings	Catches	Stumpings
Sarah Bryce	13	13	12	5	8	8	0	1
Lizelle Lee	6	1	1	1	–	–	–	–
Source: ESPN Cricinfo
