= 2021 Lightning (women's cricket) season =

Lightning
2021 season
- Coach: Rob Taylor
- Captain: Kathryn Bryce
- RHFT: 4th
- CEC: Group B, 4th
- Most runs: RHFT: Kathryn Bryce (353); CEC: Abigail Freeborn (161)
- Most wickets: RHFT: Kirstie Gordon (16); CEC: Sonia Odedra (6) & Sophie Munro (6)
- Most catches: RHFT: Kathryn Bryce (5) & Kirstie Gordon (5); CEC: Bethany Harmer (3)
- Most wicket-keeping dismissals: RHFT: Abigail Freeborn (5); CEC: Abigail Freeborn (5)

The 2021 season was Lightning's second season, in which they competed in the 50 over Rachael Heyhoe Flint Trophy and the new Twenty20 competition, the Charlotte Edwards Cup. The side finished fourth in the Rachael Heyhoe Flint Trophy, with 3 wins from their 7 matches. In the Charlotte Edwards Cup, the side finished bottom of Group A, losing all 6 of their matches.

The side was captained by Kathryn Bryce and coached by Rob Taylor. They played their home matches at five grounds across the East Midlands: Trent Bridge, Grace Road, the County Ground, Derby, the Haslegrave Ground and Kibworth Cricket Club Ground.

== Squad ==
Lightning announced their initial 18-player squad on 28 May 2021. Ella Claridge and Josie Groves were promoted to the senior squad from the Academy during the season, and played their first matches on 28 August 2021 and 10 September 2021, respectively. Age given is at the start of Lightning's first match of the season (29 May 2021).

| Name | Nationality | Birth date | Batting Style | Bowling Style | Notes |
Batters
| Shachi Pai | England | 10 October 1998 (aged 22) | Right-handed | Right-arm medium | |
All-rounders
| Kathryn Bryce | Scotland | 17 November 1997 (aged 23) | Right-handed | Right-arm medium | Captain |
| Bethan Ellis | England | 7 July 1999 (aged 21) | Right-handed | Right-arm medium | |
| Teresa Graves | England | 10 October 1998 (aged 22) | Right-handed | Right-arm medium | |
| Yvonne Graves | England | 10 October 1998 (aged 22) | Right-handed | Right-arm off break | |
| Bethany Harmer | England | 30 October 2000 (aged 20) | Right-handed | Right-arm off break | |
| Sonia Odedra | England | 3 June 1988 (aged 32) | Right-handed | Right-arm medium | |
Wicket-keepers
| Tammy Beaumont | England | 11 March 1991 (aged 30) | Right-handed | — | |
| Sarah Bryce | Scotland | 8 January 2000 (aged 21) | Right-handed | — | |
| Ella Claridge | England | 28 September 2002 (aged 18) | Right-handed | — | |
| Abigail Freeborn | England | 12 November 1996 (aged 24) | Right-handed | — | |
| Michaela Kirk | South Africa | 30 June 1999 (aged 21) | Right-handed | Right-arm off break | |
Bowlers
| Grace Ballinger | England | 3 April 2002 (aged 19) | Left-handed | Left-arm medium | |
| Kirstie Gordon | England | 20 October 1997 (aged 23) | Right-handed | Slow left-arm orthodox | |
| Josie Groves | England | 5 September 2004 (aged 16) | Right-handed | Right-arm leg break | |
| Nancy Harman | England | 11 July 1999 (aged 21) | Right-handed | Right-arm leg break | |
| Lucy Higham | England | 17 October 1997 (aged 23) | Right-handed | Right-arm off break | |
| Leah Kellogg | England | 29 June 1992 (aged 28) | Right-handed | Right-arm medium | |
| Sophie Munro | England | 31 August 2001 (aged 19) | Right-handed | Right-arm medium | |
| Alicia Presland | England | 28 September 1999 (aged 21) | Right-handed | Right-arm medium | |

== Rachael Heyhoe Flint Trophy ==
=== Season standings ===
| Pos | Team | Pld | W | L | T | NR | BP | Pts | NRR |
|---|---|---|---|---|---|---|---|---|---|
| 1 | Southern Vipers (Q) | 7 | 6 | 1 | 0 | 0 | 3 | 27 | 0.417 |
| 2 | Northern Diamonds (Q) | 7 | 5 | 2 | 0 | 0 | 3 | 23 | 1.182 |
| 3 | Central Sparks (Q) | 7 | 5 | 2 | 0 | 0 | 2 | 22 | 0.822 |
| 4 | Lightning | 7 | 3 | 4 | 0 | 0 | 1 | 13 | 0.274 |
| 5 | South East Stars | 7 | 3 | 4 | 0 | 0 | 1 | 13 | −0.226 |
| 6 | Western Storm | 7 | 3 | 4 | 0 | 0 | 1 | 13 | −0.462 |
| 7 | North West Thunder | 7 | 3 | 4 | 0 | 0 | 1 | 13 | −0.620 |
| 8 | Sunrisers | 7 | 0 | 7 | 0 | 0 | 0 | 0 | −1.598 |

Source: ESPN Cricinfo

Advanced to the final
Advanced to the play-off

=== Fixtures ===
29 May 2021
10:30 BST
Scorecard

| Lightning; 214/9 (50 overs) | v | Southern Vipers; 215/6 (46.5 overs) |
| Tammy Beaumont 57 (91); Tara Norris 3/47 (10 overs) | | Danni Wyatt 53 (57); Kirstie Gordon 4/35 (10 overs) |

Southern Vipers won by 4 wickets
Rose Bowl, Southampton
Umpires: Sophie McLelland and Tom Lungley

- Lightning won the toss and elected to bat.
- Points: Southern Vipers 4, Lightning 0

31 May 2021
10:30 BST
Scorecard

| Northern Diamonds; 151 (45.5 overs) | v | Lightning; 145 (48.1 overs) |
| Jenny Gunn 40 (77); Kathryn Bryce 4/16 (8 overs) | | Tammy Beaumont 21 (34); Katherine Brunt 4/23 (10 overs) |

Northern Diamonds won by 6 runs
Kibworth Cricket Club New Ground, Kibworth
Umpires: Joanne Ibbotson and Mark Newell

- Lightning won the toss and elected to field.
- Points: Northern Diamonds 4, Lightning 0

6 June 2021
10:30 BST
Scorecard

| Lightning; 259/5 (50 overs) | v | North West Thunder; 125 (39.2 overs) |
| Tammy Beaumont 89 (101); Sophie Ecclestone 2/23 (10 overs) | | Emma Lamb 42 (58); Kirstie Gordon 4/23 (10 overs) |

Lightning won by 134 runs
Chester Boughton Hall Cricket Club, Chester
Umpires: Jasmine Naeem and Sue Redfern

- Lightning won the toss and elected to bat.
- Points: Lightning 5, North West Thunder 0

12 June 2021
10:30 BST
Scorecard

| Sunrisers; 206/9 (50 overs) | v | Lightning; 210/5 (40.2 overs) |
| Naomi Dattani 65 (92); Teresa Graves 4/39 (10 overs) | | Michaela Kirk 57 (66); Kelly Castle 2/24 (6 overs) |

Lightning won by 5 wickets
Haslegrave Ground, Loughborough
Umpires: Hassan Adnan and Joanne Ibbotson

- Sunrisers won the toss and elected to bat.
- Points: Lightning 4, Sunrisers 0

10 September 2021
10:30 BST
Scorecard

| South East Stars; 293/9 (50 overs) | v | Lightning; 265 (49.2 overs) |
| Bryony Smith 84 (73); Yvonne Graves 3/43 (10 overs) | | Kathryn Bryce 87 (115); Bryony Smith 3/46 (10 overs) |

South East Stars won by 28 runs
County Cricket Ground, Beckenham
Umpires: Neil Mallender and Sophie McLelland

- South East Stars won the toss and elected to bat.
- Points: South East Stars 4, Lightning 0

12 September 2021
10:30 BST
Scorecard

| Western Storm; 228/7 (50 overs) | v | Lightning; 166 (41.2 overs) |
| Sophie Luff 70 (111); Kirstie Gordon 3/43 (10 overs) | | Ella Claridge 39* (48); Georgia Hennessy 2/22 (8 overs) |

Western Storm won by 62 runs
County Ground, Bristol
Umpires: Anna Harris and Ian Ramage

- Lightning won the toss and elected to field.
- Points: Western Storm 5, Lightning 0

18 September 2021
10:30 BST
Scorecard

| Lightning; 320/6 (50 overs) | v | Central Sparks; 296/9 (50 overs) |
| Kathryn Bryce 162 (156); Issy Wong 3/61 (10 overs) | | Marie Kelly 62 (69); Sonia Odedra 2/56 (9 overs) |

Lightning won by 24 runs
Haslegrave Ground, Loughborough
Umpires: Jasmine Naeem and Neil Pratt

- Central Sparks won the toss and elected to field.
- Points: Lightning 4, Central Sparks 0

=== Tournament statistics ===
==== Batting ====
| Player | Matches | Innings | Runs | Average | High score | 100s | 50s |
|---|---|---|---|---|---|---|---|
| Kathryn Bryce | 7 | 7 | 353 | 50.42 | 162 | 1 | 2 |
| Sarah Bryce | 7 | 7 | 202 | 28.85 | 90 | 0 | 1 |
| Tammy Beaumont | 3 | 3 | 167 | 55.66 | 89 | 0 | 2 |
| Abigail Freeborn | 7 | 7 | 105 | 15.00 | 44 | 0 | 0 |
| Teresa Graves | 6 | 6 | 103 | 25.75 | 32 | 0 | 0 |
| Lucy Higham | 6 | 5 | 101 | 25.25 | 32 | 0 | 0 |

Source: ESPN Cricinfo Qualification: 100 runs.

==== Bowling ====
| Player | Matches | Overs | Wickets | Average | Economy | BBI | 5wi |
|---|---|---|---|---|---|---|---|
| Kirstie Gordon | 7 | 70.0 | 16 | 15.43 | 3.52 | 4/23 | 0 |
| Kathryn Bryce | 7 | 62.5 | 10 | 24.60 | 3.91 | 4/16 | 0 |
| Teresa Graves | 6 | 37.0 | 9 | 16.44 | 4.00 | 4/39 | 0 |
| Sophie Munro | 6 | 39.2 | 6 | 29.66 | 4.52 | 2/35 | 0 |
| Yvonne Graves | 6 | 38.0 | 6 | 29.83 | 4.71 | 3/43 | 0 |
| Lucy Higham | 6 | 31.5 | 5 | 30.80 | 4.83 | 3/10 | 0 |

Source: ESPN Cricinfo Qualification: 5 wickets.

== Charlotte Edwards Cup ==
=== Group A ===
| Pos | Team | Pld | W | L | T | NR | BP | Pts | NRR |
|---|---|---|---|---|---|---|---|---|---|
| 1 | South East Stars (Q) | 6 | 5 | 1 | 0 | 0 | 1 | 21 | 1.050 |
| 2 | Southern Vipers (Q) | 6 | 4 | 2 | 0 | 0 | 3 | 19 | 0.875 |
| 3 | Central Sparks | 6 | 3 | 3 | 0 | 0 | 0 | 12 | −0.669 |
| 4 | Lightning | 6 | 0 | 6 | 0 | 0 | 0 | 0 | −1.139 |

Source: ESPN Cricinfo
- Advanced to the final
- Advanced to the semi-final

=== Fixtures ===
26 June 2021
11:00 BST
Scorecard

| Lightning; 107 (19.1 overs) | v | South East Stars; 108/4 (13.1 overs) |
| Bethany Harmer 34 (25); Bryony Smith 4/15 (3.1 overs) | | Bryony Smith 30 (14); Kathryn Bryce 2/26 (3 overs) |

South East Stars won by 6 wickets
Trent Bridge, Nottingham
Umpires: Billy Taylor and Jasmine Naeem

- Lightning won the toss and elected to bat.
- Points: South East Stars 5, Lightning 0

3 July 2021
14:30 BST
Scorecard

| Southern Vipers; 134/7 (20 overs) | v | Lightning; 88 (19.5 overs) |
| Georgia Adams 37 (38); Kathryn Bryce 2/15 (4 overs) | | Sonia Odedra 16 (22); Michaela Kirk 16 (22); Tara Norris 4/14 (3.5 overs) |

Southern Vipers won by 46 runs
Arundel Castle, Arundel
Umpires: Chris Watt and Sophie McLelland

- Lightning won the toss and elected to field.
- Points: Southern Vipers 5, Lightning 0

10 July 2021
14:30 BST
Scorecard

| Lightning; 81 (19.1 overs) | v | Central Sparks; 84/4 (19 overs) |
| Sophie Munro 20* (16); Georgia Davis 4/12 (4 overs) | | Gwenan Davies 31 (49); Sophie Munro 2/10 (3 overs) |

Central Sparks won by 6 wickets
Grace Road, Leicester
Umpires: James Middlebrook and Lina Nenova

- Lightning won the toss and elected to bat.
- Points: Central Sparks 4, Lightning 0

25 August 2021
14:30 BST
Scorecard

| South East Stars; 175/6 (20 overs) | v | Lightning; 147/7 (20 overs) |
| Alice Davidson-Richards 41* (25); Sonia Odedra 2/20 (4 overs) | | Abigail Freeborn 61 (50); Bryony Smith 2/18 (4 overs) |

South East Stars won by 28 runs
Woodbridge Road, Guildford
Umpires: Joanne Ibbotson and Billy Taylor

- Lightning won the toss and elected to field.
- Points: South East Stars 4, Lightning 0

28 August 2021
14:30 BST
Scorecard

| Lightning; 136/8 (20 overs) | v | Central Sparks; 139/6 (19.5 overs) |
| Abigail Freeborn 32 (33); Emily Arlott 2/13 (3 overs) | | Evelyn Jones 71 (55); Sonia Odedra 2/14 (4 overs) |

Central Sparks won by 4 wickets
New Road, Worcester
Umpires: Paul Pollard and Jane Pratt

- Central Sparks won the toss and elected to field.
- Points: Central Sparks 4, Lightning 0

30 August 2021
14:30 BST
Scorecard

| Lightning; 124/9 (20 overs) | v | Southern Vipers; 125/3 (20 overs) |
| Abigail Freeborn 27 (29); Tara Norris 3/26 (4 overs) | | Paige Scholfield 41* (36); Kirstie Gordon 2/20 (4 overs) |

Southern Vipers won by 7 wickets
County Cricket Ground, Derby
Umpires: Grace Bambury and Sue Redfern

- Lightning won the toss and elected to bat.
- Points: Southern Vipers 4, Lightning 0

=== Tournament statistics ===
==== Batting ====
| Player | Matches | Innings | Runs | Average | High score | 100s | 50s |
|---|---|---|---|---|---|---|---|
| Abigail Freeborn | 6 | 6 | 161 | 26.83 | 61 | 0 | 1 |
| Bethany Harmer | 6 | 6 | 70 | 11.66 | 34 | 0 | 0 |
| Sonia Odedra | 6 | 6 | 70 | 11.66 | 22 | 0 | 0 |
| Teresa Graves | 6 | 6 | 62 | 10.33 | 23 | 0 | 0 |
| Sophie Munro | 6 | 6 | 53 | 13.25 | 20* | 0 | 0 |

Source: ESPN Cricinfo Qualification: 50 runs.

==== Bowling ====
| Player | Matches | Overs | Wickets | Average | Economy | BBI | 5wi |
|---|---|---|---|---|---|---|---|
| Sonia Odedra | 6 | 20.0 | 6 | 21.00 | 6.30 | 2/14 | 0 |
| Sophie Munro | 6 | 17.0 | 6 | 21.66 | 7.64 | 2/10 | 0 |
| Kathryn Bryce | 3 | 10.0 | 5 | 10.20 | 5.10 | 2/15 | 0 |

Source: ESPN Cricinfo Qualification: 5 wickets.

== Season statistics ==
=== Batting ===
| Player | Rachael Heyhoe Flint Trophy | | | | | | | | Charlotte Edwards Cup | | | | | | | |
| Player | Matches | Innings | Runs | High score | Average | Strike rate | 100s | 50s | Matches | Innings | Runs | High score | Average | Strike rate | 100s | 50s |
|---|---|---|---|---|---|---|---|---|---|---|---|---|---|---|---|---|
| Grace Ballinger | 3 | 2 | 24 | 18 | 12.00 | 109.09 | 0 | 0 | 4 | 2 | 0 | 0* | – | 0.00 | 0 | 0 |
| Tammy Beaumont | 3 | 3 | 167 | 89 | 55.66 | 73.89 | 0 | 2 | – | – | – | – | – | – | – | – |
| Kathryn Bryce | 7 | 7 | 353 | 162 | 50.42 | 80.96 | 1 | 2 | 3 | 3 | 29 | 13 | 9.66 | 64.44 | 0 | 0 |
| Sarah Bryce | 7 | 7 | 202 | 90 | 28.85 | 73.45 | 0 | 1 | 3 | 3 | 10 | 6 | 3.33 | 43.47 | 0 | 0 |
| Ella Claridge | 3 | 3 | 46 | 39* | 23.00 | 73.01 | 0 | 0 | 2 | 2 | 21 | 20 | 10.50 | 84.00 | 0 | 0 |
| Bethan Ellis | 1 | 1 | 4 | 4 | 4.00 | 66.66 | 0 | 0 | – | – | – | – | – | – | – | – |
| Abigail Freeborn | 7 | 7 | 105 | 44 | 15.00 | 54.40 | 0 | 0 | 6 | 6 | 161 | 61 | 26.83 | 99.38 | 0 | 1 |
| Kirstie Gordon | 7 | 4 | 57 | 24 | 14.25 | 67.85 | 0 | 0 | 6 | 6 | 42 | 20 | 8.40 | 97.67 | 0 | 0 |
| Teresa Graves | 6 | 6 | 103 | 32 | 25.75 | 65.60 | 0 | 0 | 6 | 6 | 62 | 23 | 10.33 | 76.54 | 0 | 0 |
| Yvonne Graves | 6 | 4 | 53 | 22* | 17.66 | 53.00 | 0 | 0 | 3 | – | – | – | – | – | – | – |
| Josie Groves | 1 | 1 | 2 | 2* | – | 100.00 | 0 | 0 | – | – | – | – | – | – | – | – |
| Nancy Harman | 1 | – | – | – | – | – | – | – | 3 | 3 | 9 | 6 | 9.00 | 90.00 | 0 | 0 |
| Bethany Harmer | 3 | 3 | 21 | 14 | 7.00 | 77.77 | 0 | 0 | 6 | 6 | 70 | 34 | 11.66 | 102.94 | 0 | 0 |
| Lucy Higham | 6 | 5 | 101 | 32 | 25.25 | 69.17 | 0 | 0 | 4 | 4 | 29 | 22 | 7.25 | 72.50 | 0 | 0 |
| Michaela Kirk | 4 | 3 | 71 | 57 | 23.66 | 70.29 | 0 | 1 | 3 | 3 | 18 | 16 | 6.00 | 64.28 | 0 | 0 |
| Sophie Munro | 6 | 4 | 20 | 17 | 10.00 | 74.07 | 0 | 0 | 6 | 6 | 53 | 20* | 13.25 | 126.19 | 0 | 0 |
| Sonia Odedra | 4 | 4 | 63 | 24* | 31.50 | 70.78 | 0 | 0 | 6 | 6 | 70 | 22 | 11.66 | 74.46 | 0 | 0 |
| Shachi Pai | 2 | 1 | 9 | 9 | 9.00 | 34.61 | 0 | 0 | 5 | 5 | 49 | 24 | 9.80 | 87.50 | 0 | 0 |
Source: ESPN Cricinfo

=== Bowling ===
| Player | Rachael Heyhoe Flint Trophy | | | | | | | Charlotte Edwards Cup | | | | | | |
| Player | Matches | Overs | Wickets | Average | Economy | BBI | 5wi | Matches | Overs | Wickets | Average | Economy | BBI | 5wi |
|---|---|---|---|---|---|---|---|---|---|---|---|---|---|---|
| Grace Ballinger | 3 | 26.0 | 4 | 40.25 | 6.19 | 2/60 | 0 | 4 | 12.0 | 3 | 29.66 | 7.41 | 1/16 | 0 |
| Kathryn Bryce | 7 | 62.5 | 10 | 24.60 | 3.91 | 4/16 | 0 | 3 | 10.0 | 5 | 10.20 | 5.10 | 2/15 | 0 |
| Bethan Ellis | 1 | 2.0 | 0 | – | 8.00 | – | 0 | – | – | – | – | – | – | – |
| Kirstie Gordon | 7 | 70.0 | 16 | 15.43 | 3.52 | 4/23 | 0 | 6 | 23.0 | 3 | 52.00 | 6.78 | 2/20 | 0 |
| Teresa Graves | 6 | 37.0 | 9 | 16.44 | 4.00 | 4/39 | 0 | 6 | 10.0 | 2 | 33.50 | 6.70 | 1/11 | 0 |
| Yvonne Graves | 6 | 38.0 | 6 | 29.83 | 4.71 | 3/43 | 0 | 3 | 7.0 | 2 | 24.50 | 7.00 | 1/10 | 0 |
| Josie Groves | 1 | 8.0 | 0 | – | 7.37 | – | 0 | – | – | – | – | – | – | – |
| Nancy Harman | 1 | 4.0 | 0 | – | 5.50 | – | 0 | 3 | 1.0 | 0 | – | 16.00 | – | 0 |
| Lucy Higham | 6 | 31.5 | 5 | 30.80 | 4.83 | 3/10 | 0 | 4 | 12.0 | 2 | 26.00 | 4.33 | 1/10 | 0 |
| Sophie Munro | 6 | 39.2 | 6 | 29.66 | 4.52 | 2/35 | 0 | 6 | 17.0 | 6 | 21.66 | 7.64 | 2/10 | 0 |
| Sonia Odedra | 4 | 13.0 | 2 | 39.50 | 6.07 | 2/56 | 0 | 6 | 20.0 | 6 | 21.00 | 6.30 | 2/14 | 0 |
Source: ESPN Cricinfo

=== Fielding ===
| Player | Rachael Heyhoe Flint Trophy | | | Charlotte Edwards Cup | | |
| Player | Matches | Innings | Catches | Matches | Innings | Catches |
|---|---|---|---|---|---|---|
| Grace Ballinger | 3 | 3 | 1 | 4 | 4 | 1 |
| Tammy Beaumont | 3 | 3 | 3 | – | – | – |
| Kathryn Bryce | 7 | 7 | 5 | 3 | 3 | 0 |
| Sarah Bryce | 7 | 3 | 1 | 3 | – | – |
| Ella Claridge | 3 | 3 | 1 | 2 | 2 | 0 |
| Bethan Ellis | 1 | 1 | 1 | – | – | – |
| Abigail Freeborn | 7 | 4 | 4 | 6 | 3 | 0 |
| Kirstie Gordon | 7 | 7 | 5 | 6 | 6 | 2 |
| Teresa Graves | 6 | 6 | 0 | 6 | 6 | 1 |
| Yvonne Graves | 6 | 6 | 0 | 3 | 3 | 1 |
| Josie Groves | 1 | 1 | 0 | – | – | – |
| Nancy Harman | 1 | 1 | 0 | 3 | 3 | 0 |
| Bethany Harmer | 3 | 3 | 2 | 6 | 6 | 3 |
| Lucy Higham | 6 | 6 | 3 | 4 | 4 | 0 |
| Michaela Kirk | 4 | 4 | 1 | 3 | 3 | 2 |
| Sophie Munro | 6 | 6 | 2 | 6 | 6 | 1 |
| Sonia Odedra | 4 | 4 | 1 | 6 | 6 | 1 |
| Shachi Pai | 2 | 2 | 0 | 5 | 5 | 0 |
Source: ESPN Cricinfo

=== Wicket-keeping ===
| Player | Rachael Heyhoe Flint Trophy | | | | Charlotte Edwards Cup | | | |
| Player | Matches | Innings | Catches | Stumpings | Matches | Innings | Catches | Stumpings |
|---|---|---|---|---|---|---|---|---|
| Sarah Bryce | 7 | 4 | 3 | 0 | 3 | 3 | 1 | 1 |
| Abigail Freeborn | 7 | 3 | 3 | 2 | 6 | 3 | 0 | 5 |
Source: ESPN Cricinfo
