= 2024 The Blaze (women's cricket) season =

English cricket season

The Blaze
2024 season
- Coach: Chris Guest
- Captain: Kirstie Gordon
- Overseas player: (South Africa) Nadine de Klerk (Australia) Heather Graham (Ireland) Orla Prendergast
- RHFT: 5th
- CEC: Champions
- Most runs: RHFT: Ella Claridge (324); CEC: Kathryn Bryce (478)
- Most wickets: RHFT: Kirstie Gordon (19); CEC: Kirstie Gordon (22)
- Most catches: RHFT: Marie Kelly (9); CEC: Marie Kelly (11)
- Most wicket-keeping dismissals: RHFT: Sarah Bryce (6); CEC: Sarah Bryce (13)

The 2024 season saw The Blaze compete in the 50 over Rachael Heyhoe Flint Trophy and the Twenty20 Charlotte Edwards Cup. The season was their second since their rebrand as The Blaze, having previously been known as Lightning. In the Charlotte Edwards Cup, the side finished top of the group stage, winning nine of their ten matches, before defeating Central Sparks in the semi-finals and South East Stars in the final to win their first ever trophy. In the Rachael Heyhoe Flint Trophy, the side finished fifth in the group, winning seven of their fourteen matches.

The side was captained by Kirstie Gordon and coached by Chris Guest. They played four home matches at Trent Bridge, two apiece at Grace Road, the County Ground, Derby and Queen's Park, Chesterfield and one apiece at Haslegrave Ground and Lindum Sports Club Ground.

== Squad ==
=== Departures ===
On 22 May 2024, it was announced that the side had loaned out Sophie Munro to Sunrisers for the Charlotte Edwards Cup. Munro's loan was later extended until the end of July, and later extended again until the end of the season.

=== Arrivals ===
On 20 December 2023, it was announced that The Blaze had signed Scarlett Hughes from Sunrisers. On 11 January 2024, it was announced that The Blaze had signed Nadine de Klerk as an overseas player for the entire 2024 season. de Klerk had previously played for the side in 2023. On 17 April 2024, the side announced the signing of Heather Graham as an overseas replacement for de Klerk in June and July. On 19 April 2024, it was announced that the side had signed Daisy Mullan on loan from North West Thunder for the opening six rounds of the 2024 Rachael Heyhoe Flint Trophy. On the same day, Bethan Gammon and Prisha Thanawala were included in a matchday squad for the first time. On 26 April 2024, Bella Howarth was named in a matchday squad for the first time. On 30 April 2024, Brianna Ray was named in a matchday squad for the first time. On 18 June 2024, Rhiannon Knowling-Davies was included in a matchday squad for the first time. On 16 August 2024, the side announced the signing of Orla Prendergast as an overseas player for the remainder of the season, replacing the injured Nadine de Klerk. On 2 September 2024, it was announced that the side had signed Charley Phillips on loan from Sunrisers until the end of the season.

=== Squad list ===
- Age given is at the start of The Blaze's first match of the season (20 April 2024).

Name	Nationality	Birth date	Batting Style	Bowling Style	Notes
Batters
Georgie Boyce	England	4 October 1998 (aged 25)	Right-handed	Right-arm medium	
Bethany Harmer	England	30 October 2000 (aged 23)	Right-handed	Right-arm off break	
Marie Kelly	England	9 February 1996 (aged 28)	Right-handed	Right-arm off break	
Prisha Thanawala	England	16 November 2001 (aged 22)	Right-handed	Right-arm off break	Joined April 2024
All-rounders
Kathryn Bryce	Scotland	17 November 1997 (aged 26)	Right-handed	Right-arm medium	
Nadine de Klerk	South Africa	16 January 2000 (aged 24)	Right-handed	Right-arm medium	Overseas player
Heather Graham	Australia	5 October 1996 (aged 27)	Right-handed	Right-arm medium	Overseas player; June to July 2024
Teresa Graves	England	10 October 1998 (aged 25)	Right-handed	Right-arm medium	
Bella Howarth	England	Unknown	Right-handed	Right-arm medium	Joined April 2024
Brianna Ray	Bermuda	16 November 2003 (aged 20)	Right-handed	Right-arm medium	Joined April 2024
Orla Prendergast	Ireland	1 June 2002 (aged 21)	Right-handed	Right-arm medium	Overseas player; August to September 2024
Nat Sciver-Brunt	England	20 August 1992 (aged 31)	Right-handed	Right-arm medium	
Wicket-keepers
Tammy Beaumont	England	11 March 1991 (aged 33)	Right-handed	—	
Sarah Bryce	Scotland	8 January 2000 (aged 24)	Right-handed	—	
Ella Claridge	England	28 September 2002 (aged 21)	Right-handed	—	
Bethan Gammon	Wales	10 March 2001 (aged 23)	Right-handed	—	Joined April 2024
Scarlett Hughes	England	18 June 2002 (aged 21)	Left-handed	—	
Michaela Kirk	South Africa	30 June 1999 (aged 24)	Right-handed	Right-arm off break	
Bowlers
Grace Ballinger	England	3 April 2002 (aged 22)	Left-handed	Left-arm medium	
Sarah Glenn	England	27 August 1999 (aged 24)	Right-handed	Right-arm leg break	
Kirstie Gordon	England	20 October 1997 (aged 26)	Right-handed	Slow left-arm orthodox	Captain
Josie Groves	England	5 September 2004 (aged 19)	Right-handed	Right-arm leg break	
Lucy Higham	England	17 October 1997 (aged 26)	Right-handed	Right-arm off break	
Rhiannon Knowling-Davies	England	Unknown	Right-handed	Right-arm medium	Joined June 2024
Cassidy McCarthy	England	23 July 2002 (aged 21)	Right-handed	Right-arm medium	
Sophie Munro	England	31 August 2001 (aged 22)	Right-handed	Right-arm medium	Loaned to Sunrisers from May to September 2024
Charley Phillips	England	8 May 2003 (aged 20)	Right-handed	Right-arm medium	On loan from Sunrisers, September 2024

== Rachael Heyhoe Flint Trophy ==
=== Season standings ===
Pos	Team	Pld	W	L	T	NR	BP	Pts	NRR
1	Northern Diamonds (Q)	14	9	4	0	1	3	41	0.097
2	South East Stars (Q)	14	9	5	0	0	4	40	0.246
3	Southern Vipers (Q)	14	7	6	0	1	4	34	0.534
4	Sunrisers (Q)	14	7	6	0	1	4	34	−0.122
5	The Blaze	14	7	6	0	1	1	31	−0.176
6	North West Thunder	14	5	8	0	1	3	25	−0.013
7	Central Sparks	14	5	8	0	1	3	25	−0.299
8	Western Storm	14	4	10	0	0	2	18	−0.211

Source: ESPNCricinfo

advanced to the Semi-finals

=== Fixtures ===
20 April 2024
10:30
Scorecard

Central Sparks; 213/9 (50 overs)	v	The Blaze; 135 (41 overs)
Abigail Freeborn 53 (87); Grace Ballinger 3/47 (10 overs)		Nadine de Klerk 43 (65); Hannah Baker 3/29 (8 overs)

Central Sparks won by 78 runs
Edgbaston Cricket Ground, Birmingham
Umpires: Grace Bambury and Rob White

- Central Sparks won the toss and elected to bat.
- Points: Central Sparks 5, The Blaze 0

24 April 2024
10:30
Scorecard

The Blaze; 126 (42 overs)	v	South East Stars; 127/2 (23.3 overs)
Kirstie Gordon 41* (86); Ryana MacDonald-Gay 5/31 (10 overs)		Tash Farrant 68* (81); Kirstie Gordon 1/29 (7 overs)

South East Stars won by 8 wickets
Grace Road, Leicester
Umpires: Jasmine Naeem and Paul Baldwin

- The Blaze won the toss and elected to bat.
- Points: South East Stars 5, The Blaze 0

27 April 2024
10:30
Scorecard

The Blaze; 87 (31.3 overs)	v	Sunrisers; 91/3 (20.5 overs)
Nadine de Klerk 15 (22); Mady Villiers 3/18 (9 overs)		Grace Scrivens 46* (50); Lucy Higham 1/10 (3 overs)

Sunrisers won by 7 wickets
County Ground, Chelmsford
Umpires: Fiona Richards and Simon Widdup

- Sunrisers won the toss and elected to bowl.
- Points: Sunrisers 5, The Blaze 0

1 May 2024
10:30
Scorecard

Northern Diamonds; 188 (47.4 overs)	v	The Blaze; 189/8 (49.4 overs)
Leah Dobson 54 (85); Sophie Munro 3/28 (8.4 overs)		Bethan Gammon 39 (52); Erin Burns 3/40 (10 overs)

The Blaze won by 2 wickets
North Marine Road Ground, Scarborough
Umpires: Amy Clark and Sue Redfern

- Northern Diamonds won the toss and elected to bat.
- Points: The Blaze 4, Northern Diamonds 0

6 May 2024
10:30
Scorecard

The Blaze; 174 (46.4 overs)	v	North West Thunder; 176/9 (44.4 overs)
Kirstie Gordon 43 (82); Mahika Gaur 3/33 (7 overs)		Seren Smale 58 (70); Kirstie Gordon 3/25 (10 overs)

North West Thunder won by 1 wicket
Trent Bridge, Nottingham
Umpires: Chris Watts and Rose Dovey

- North West Thunder won the toss and elected to bowl.
- Points: North West Thunder 4, The Blaze 0

8 May 2024
10:30
Scorecard

Western Storm; 275 (48.1 overs)	v	The Blaze; 276/6 (48 overs)
Nat Wraith 73 (54); Kirstie Gordon 4/40 (10 overs)		Nadine de Klerk 106* (113); Sophia Smale 2/47 (9 overs)

The Blaze won by 4 wickets
Trent Bridge, Nottingham
Umpires: Anthony Harris and Jasmine Naeem

- The Blaze won the toss and elected to bowl.
- Points: The Blaze 4, Western Storm 0

30 June 2024
10:30
Scorecard

The Blaze; 318/8 (44 overs)	v	South East Stars; 185 (32 overs)
Sarah Bryce 81 (71); Tash Farrant 2/67 (7 overs)		Alice Davidson-Richards 44 (33); Heather Graham 6/39 (6 overs)

The Blaze won by 133 runs (DLS)
County Ground, Beckenham
Umpires: Jack Shantry and Sophie McLelland

- South East Stars won the toss and elected to bowl.
- Match reduced to 44 overs per side due to rain.
- Points: The Blaze 5, South East Stars 0

5 July 2024
10:30
Scorecard

The Blaze; 278 (47.2 overs)	v	Southern Vipers; 281/6 (49.2 overs)
Heather Graham 78 (59); Mary Taylor 3/32 (6.2 overs)		Georgia Elwiss 101* (110); Kathryn Bryce 2/43 (9.2 overs)

Southern Vipers won by 4 wickets
Queen's Park, Chesterfield
Umpires: Amy Clark and Paul Pollard

- The Blaze won the toss and elected to bat.
- Points: Southern Vipers 4, The Blaze 0

10 July 2024
10:30
Scorecard

Western Storm; 217 (46.5 overs)	v	The Blaze; 220/5 (42.3 overs)
Fran Wilson 67 (68); Kathryn Bryce 4/20 (8.5 overs)		Sarah Bryce 61 (54); Alex Griffiths 2/33 (5 overs)

The Blaze won by 5 wickets
College Ground, Cheltenham
Umpires: Ben Peverall and Julia Jarvis

- The Blaze won the toss and elected to bowl.
- Points: The Blaze 4, Western Storm 0

14 July 2024
10:30
Scorecard

Northern Diamonds; 188/8 (26 overs)	v	The Blaze
Bess Heath 61 (45); Grace Ballinger 3/43 (6 overs)

No result
Lindum Sports Club Ground, Lincoln
Umpires: Naeem Ashraf and Sophie McLelland

- The Blaze won the toss and elected to bowl.
- Match reduced to 30 overs per side due to rain.
- No further play possible due to rain.
- Points: The Blaze 2, Northern Diamonds 2

26 August 2024
10:30
Scorecard

The Blaze; 208 (49.5 overs)	v	Southern Vipers; 188 (44 overs)
Marie Kelly 40 (37); Ava Lee 4/51 (10 overs)		Emily Windsor 41 (64); Orla Prendergast 3/38 (7 overs)

The Blaze won by 20 runs
Arundel Castle Cricket Ground, Arundel
Umpires: Anthony Harris and Rose Dovey

- Southern Vipers won the toss and elected to bowl.
- Points: The Blaze 4, Southern Vipers 0

31 August 2024
10:30
Scorecard

Sunrisers; 245 (49.4 overs)	v	The Blaze; 249/4 (43.3 overs)
Cordelia Griffith 65 (73); Kathryn Bryce 4/41 (8.4 overs)		Kathryn Bryce 87* (95); Eva Gray 2/29 (10 overs)

The Blaze won by 6 wickets
County Ground, Derby
Umpires: Joanne Ibbotson and Surendiran Shanmugam

- Sunrisers won the toss and elected to bat.
- Points: The Blaze 4, Sunrisers 0

4 September 2024
10:30
Scorecard

The Blaze; 197 (47 overs)	v	North West Thunder; 173 (45.4 overs)
Sarah Bryce 34 (37); Fi Morris 6/35 (9 overs)		Tara Norris 53* (56); Grace Ballinger 4/23 (9 overs)

The Blaze won by 24 runs
Rookwood Cricket Ground, Sale
Umpires: Anthony Harris and Naeem Ashraf

- North West Thunder won the toss and elected to field.
- Points: The Blaze 4, North West Thunder 0

6 September 2024
10:30
Scorecard

The Blaze; 166 (46.5 overs)	v	Central Sparks; 170/5 (41.2 overs)
Michaela Kirk 36 (55); Grace Potts 3/38 (8.5 overs)		Katie George 57* (90); Kirstie Gordon 2/24 (10 overs)

Central Sparks won by 5 wickets
Queen's Park, Chesterfield
Umpires: Naeem Ashraf and Rose Dovey

- Central Sparks won the toss and elected to bowl.
- Points: Central Sparks 4, The Blaze 0

=== Tournament statistics ===
==== Batting ====
Player	Matches	Innings	Runs	Average	High score	100s	50s
Ella Claridge	14	13	324	36.00	71	0	2
Sarah Bryce	8	7	279	39.85	81	0	2
Kathryn Bryce	8	7	272	45.33	87*	0	2
Marie Kelly	14	13	205	15.76	52	0	1

Source: ESPN Cricinfo Qualification: 200 runs.

==== Bowling ====
Player	Matches	Overs	Wickets	Average	Economy	BBI	5wi
Kirstie Gordon	13	115.0	19	23.68	3.91	4/40	0
Grace Ballinger	14	96.0	17	29.41	5.20	4/23	0
Kathryn Bryce	8	58.3	15	15.13	3.88	4/20	0

Source: ESPN Cricinfo Qualification: 10 wickets.

== Charlotte Edwards Cup ==
=== Season standings ===
Pos	Team	Pld	W	L	T	NR	BP	Pts	NRR
1	The Blaze (Q)	10	9	1	0	0	3	39	0.606
2	South East Stars (Q)	10	7	2	0	1	4	34	0.309
3	Southern Vipers (Q)	10	6	4	0	0	2	26	1.001
4	Central Sparks (Q)	10	6	4	0	0	2	26	0.402
5	North West Thunder	10	3	6	0	1	1	15	−0.727
6	Northern Diamonds	10	3	7	0	0	1	13	−0.067
7	Western Storm	10	2	6	0	2	1	13	−0.659
8	Sunrisers	10	2	8	0	0	0	8	−1.073

Source: ESPNCricinfo

advanced to the Semi-finals

=== Fixtures ===
18 May 2024
14:30
Scorecard

The Blaze; 112/9 (20 overs)	v	Southern Vipers; 109/9 (20 overs)
Lucy Higham 36* (26); Mary Taylor 2/12 (4 overs)		Ella McCaughan 19 (31); Kirstie Gordon 2/13 (4 overs)

The Blaze won by 3 runs
Rose Bowl, Southampton
Umpires: James Tredwell and Sophie McLelland

- Southern Vipers won the toss and elected to bowl.
- Points: The Blaze 4, Southern Vipers 0

23 May 2024
18:30
Scorecard

The Blaze; 136 (20 overs)	v	Northern Diamonds; 132/7 (20 overs)
Kathryn Bryce 31 (29); Erin Burns 5/25 (4 overs)		Lauren Winfield-Hill 38 (37); Kirstie Gordon 3/20 (4 overs)

The Blaze won by 4 runs
Trent Bridge, Nottingham
Umpires: Amy Clark and Simon Widdup

- Northern Diamonds won the toss and elected to bowl.
- Points: The Blaze 4, Northern Diamonds 0

26 May 2024
14:30
Scorecard

North West Thunder; 151/6 (20 overs)	v	The Blaze; 152/5 (18.5 overs)
Emma Lamb 63* (50); Grace Ballinger 2/25 (4 overs)		Kathryn Bryce 61 (51); Mahika Gaur 3/39 (4 overs)

The Blaze won by 5 wickets
Haslegrave Ground, Loughborough
Umpires: Joanne Ibbotson and Neil Mallender

- The Blaze won the toss and elected to bowl.
- Points: The Blaze 4, North West Thunder 0

31 May 2024
14:30
Scorecard

The Blaze; 134/6 (20 overs)	v	Central Sparks; 124/7 (20 overs)
Kathryn Bryce 57 (47); Emily Arlott 2/23 (4 overs)		Katie George 28* (25); Kirstie Gordon 2/22 (4 overs)

The Blaze won by 10 runs
Trent Bridge, Nottingham
Umpires: Amy Clark and Anthony Harris

- Central Sparks won the toss and elected to bowl.
- Points: The Blaze 4, Central Sparks 0

2 June 2024
16:00
Scorecard

North West Thunder; 111/9 (20 overs)	v	The Blaze; 112/3 (15.4 overs)
Danielle Collins 30 (32); Kirstie Gordon 5/12 (4 overs)		Tammy Beaumont 34* (45); Kate Cross 1/16 (2.4 overs)

The Blaze won by 7 wickets
Old Trafford Cricket Ground, Manchester
Umpires: Gabi Brown and Naeem Ashraf

- North West Thunder won the toss and elected to bat.
- Points: The Blaze 5, North West Thunder 0

7 June 2024
14:30
Scorecard

Western Storm; 99 (19.3 overs)	v	The Blaze; 103/3 (14.1 overs)
Heather Knight 20 (19); Heather Graham 4/10 (3.3 overs)		Kathryn Bryce 46 (33); Ellie Anderson 1/16 (2 overs)

The Blaze won by 7 wickets
Grace Road, Leicester
Umpires: Neil Pratt and Rose Dovey

- Western Storm won the toss and elected to bat.
- Points: The Blaze 5, Western Storm 0

9 June 2024
11:00
Scorecard

The Blaze; 159/7 (20 overs)	v	Northern Diamonds; 146 (19.5 overs)
Kathryn Bryce 54 (39); Erin Burns 3/19 (4 overs)		Bess Heath 59 (32); Sarah Glenn 3/33 (4 overs)

The Blaze won by 13 runs
Headingley Cricket Ground, Leeds
Umpires: Amy Clark and Neil Mallender

- Northern Diamonds won the toss and elected to bowl.
- Points: The Blaze 4, Northern Diamonds 0

13 June 2024
14:15
Scorecard

Sunrisers; 137/7 (20 overs)	v	The Blaze; 140/2 (15.1 overs)
Grace Scrivens 42 (38); Heather Graham 2/22 (4 overs)		Kathryn Bryce 57* (37); Eva Gray 1/24 (3 overs)

The Blaze won by 8 wickets
Lord's, London
Umpires: Gabi Brown and James Tredwell

- The Blaze won the toss and elected to bowl.
- Points: The Blaze 5, Sunrisers 0

16 June 2024
11:30
Scorecard

The Blaze; 84 (18.5 overs)	v	South East Stars; 89/5 (15.1 overs)
Sarah Glenn 21 (24); Alexa Stonehouse 3/13 (4 overs)		Emma Jones 30* (15); Sarah Glenn 3/14 (4 overs)

South East Stars won by 5 wickets
County Ground, Derby
Umpires: Rob White and Sophie McLelland

- The Blaze won the toss and elected to bat.
- Points: South East Stars 5, The Blaze 0

19 June 2024
11:30
Scorecard

Central Sparks; 138/8 (20 overs)	v	The Blaze; 139/5 (19.2 overs)
Abigail Freeborn 39 (32); Josie Groves 2/13 (2 overs)		Marie Kelly 89* (63); Grace Potts 1/16 (3 overs)

The Blaze won by 5 wickets
Edgbaston Cricket Ground, Birmingham
Umpires: Gabi Brown and Sue Redfern

- Central Sparks won the toss and elected to bat.
- Points: The Blaze 4, Central Sparks 0

==== Semi-final ====
22 June 2024
11:00 BST
Scorecard

Central Sparks; 140/9 (20 overs)	v	The Blaze; 142/5 (18 overs)
Courtney Webb 45* (31); Josie Groves 2/16 (4 overs)		Kathryn Bryce 44 (39); Hannah Baker 3/24 (4 overs)

The Blaze won by 5 wickets
County Cricket Ground, Derby
Umpires: Rose Dovey and Simon Widdup
Player of the match: Kathryn Bryce (The Blaze)

- The Blaze won the toss and elected to bowl.

==== Final ====
22 June 2024
18:45 BST (D/N)
Scorecard

South East Stars; 141/9 (20 overs)	v	The Blaze; 144/3 (18.4 overs)
Georgia Redmayne 25 (25); Heather Graham 3/16 (4 overs)		Kathryn Bryce 62 (45); Danielle Gregory 1/26 (4 overs)

The Blaze won by 7 wickets
County Cricket Ground, Derby
Umpires: Anna Harris and Rob White
Player of the match: Kathryn Bryce (The Blaze)

- The Blaze won the toss and elected to bowl.

=== Tournament statistics ===
==== Batting ====
Player	Matches	Innings	Runs	Average	High score	100s	50s
Kathryn Bryce	12	12	478	43.45	62	0	5
Sarah Bryce	12	12	230	25.55	54*	0	2
Marie Kelly	12	10	153	19.12	89*	0	1

Source: ESPN Cricinfo Qualification: 150 runs.

==== Bowling ====
Player	Matches	Overs	Wickets	Average	Economy	BBI	5wi
Kirstie Gordon	12	47.1	22	12.50	5.83	5/12	1
Heather Graham	7	24.2	15	9.20	5.67	4/10	0
Grace Ballinger	12	43.0	11	24.63	6.30	2/25	0
Kathryn Bryce	12	37.0	10	26.10	7.05	2/16	0

Source: ESPN Cricinfo Qualification: 10 wickets.

== Season statistics ==
=== Batting ===
Player	Rachael Heyhoe Flint Trophy								Charlotte Edwards Cup							
Player	Matches	Innings	Runs	High score	Average	Strike rate	100s	50s	Matches	Innings	Runs	High score	Average	Strike rate	100s	50s
Grace Ballinger	14	8	63	25	21.00	38.18	0	0	12	3	2	1*	2.00	40.00	0	0
Tammy Beaumont	5	4	131	59	32.75	80.36	0	1	9	9	141	45	17.62	98.60	0	0
Georgie Boyce	1	1	27	27*	–	57.44	0	0	–	–	–	–	–	–	–	–
Kathryn Bryce	8	7	272	87*	45.33	83.18	0	2	12	12	478	62	43.45	120.10	0	5
Sarah Bryce	8	7	279	81	39.85	94.57	0	2	12	12	230	54*	25.55	107.98	0	2
Ella Claridge	14	13	324	71	36.00	76.59	0	2	12	8	84	18*	16.80	102.43	0	0
Nadine de Klerk	6	6	177	106*	35.40	69.68	1	0	5	5	60	25	15.00	93.75	0	0
Bethan Gammon	4	4	66	39	16.50	70.96	0	0	–	–	–	–	–	–	–	–
Sarah Glenn	3	3	5	3	1.66	16.66	0	0	4	3	29	21	14.50	82.85	0	0
Kirstie Gordon	13	11	176	43	19.55	51.16	0	0	12	4	38	29	12.66	90.47	0	0
Heather Graham	4	3	117	78	39.00	123.15	0	1	7	6	50	16	12.50	96.15	0	0
Teresa Graves	9	9	111	33	12.33	54.14	0	0	8	8	59	29	7.37	88.05	0	0
Josie Groves	9	5	23	10*	5.75	31.94	0	0	11	5	63	24*	31.50	134.04	0	0
Bethany Harmer	2	2	22	17	11.00	52.38	0	0	–	–	–	–	–	–	–	–
Lucy Higham	11	8	129	62*	21.50	67.53	0	1	12	3	43	36*	21.50	126.47	0	0
Marie Kelly	14	13	205	52	15.76	77.06	0	1	12	10	153	89*	19.12	123.38	0	1
Michaela Kirk	5	4	89	36	22.25	58.55	0	0	4	2	13	9	13.00	86.66	0	0
Cassidy McCarthy	12	9	49	12	6.12	98.00	0	0	–	–	–	–	–	–	–	–
Daisy Mullan	4	4	47	18	11.75	40.17	0	0	–	–	–	–	–	–	–	–
Sophie Munro	5	5	37	19	7.40	43.52	0	0	–	–	–	–	–	–	–	–
Orla Prendergast	3	3	44	29	14.66	61.97	0	0	–	–	–	–	–	–	–	–
Source: ESPN Cricinfo

=== Bowling ===
Player	Rachael Heyhoe Flint Trophy							Charlotte Edwards Cup						
Player	Matches	Overs	Wickets	Average	Economy	BBI	5wi	Matches	Overs	Wickets	Average	Economy	BBI	5wi
Grace Ballinger	14	96.0	17	29.41	5.20	4/23	0	12	43.0	11	24.63	6.30	2/25	0
Kathryn Bryce	8	58.3	15	15.13	3.88	4/20	0	12	37.0	10	26.10	7.05	2/16	0
Nadine de Klerk	6	41.4	5	40.80	4.89	2/53	0	5	12.0	4	21.00	7.00	2/27	0
Sarah Glenn	3	20.0	2	41.00	4.10	2/36	0	4	15.0	8	12.37	6.60	3/14	0
Kirstie Gordon	13	115.0	19	23.68	3.91	4/40	0	12	47.1	22	12.50	5.83	5/12	1
Heather Graham	4	28.0	9	18.33	5.89	6/39	1	7	24.2	15	9.20	5.67	4/10	0
Teresa Graves	9	6.3	2	15.00	4.61	1/0	0	8	2.0	0	–	9.00	–	0
Josie Groves	9	49.0	8	32.25	5.26	2/26	0	11	25.0	9	16.88	6.08	3/33	0
Lucy Higham	11	51.0	8	28.37	4.45	3/28	0	12	28.0	7	26.14	6.53	3/24	0
Marie Kelly	14	8.0	1	39.00	4.87	1/22	0	12	1.0	0	–	10.00	–	0
Cassidy McCarthy	12	43.2	5	50.60	5.83	2/42	0	–	–	–	–	–	–	–
Sophie Munro	5	34.4	8	15.50	3.57	3/28	0	–	–	–	–	–	–	–
Orla Prendergast	3	18.0	5	16.00	4.44	3/38	0	–	–	–	–	–	–	–
Source: ESPN Cricinfo

=== Fielding ===
Player	Rachael Heyhoe Flint Trophy			Charlotte Edwards Cup		
Player	Matches	Innings	Catches	Matches	Innings	Catches
Grace Ballinger	14	14	1	12	12	1
Tammy Beaumont	5	5	3	9	9	0
Georgie Boyce	1	1	0	–	–	–
Kathryn Bryce	8	8	3	12	12	4
Ella Claridge	14	8	1	12	12	3
Nadine de Klerk	6	6	0	5	5	0
Bethan Gammon	4	4	0	–	–	–
Sarah Glenn	3	3	1	4	4	1
Kirstie Gordon	13	13	6	12	12	10
Heather Graham	4	4	0	7	7	1
Teresa Graves	9	9	2	8	8	0
Josie Groves	9	9	3	11	11	3
Bethany Harmer	2	2	0	–	–	–
Lucy Higham	11	11	1	12	12	4
Marie Kelly	14	14	9	12	12	11
Michaela Kirk	5	5	3	4	4	1
Cassidy McCarthy	12	12	4	–	–	–
Daisy Mullan	4	4	3	–	–	–
Sophie Munro	5	5	1	–	–	–
Orla Prendergast	3	3	0	–	–	–
Source: ESPN Cricinfo

=== Wicket-keeping ===
Player	Rachael Heyhoe Flint Trophy				Charlotte Edwards Cup			
Player	Matches	Innings	Catches	Stumpings	Matches	Innings	Catches	Stumpings
Sarah Bryce	8	8	4	2	12	12	2	11
Ella Claridge	14	6	1	4	12	–	–	–
Source: ESPN Cricinfo
