= 2022 Lightning (women's cricket) season =

English cricket season

Lightning
2022 season
- Coach: Chris Guest
- Captain: Kathryn Bryce
- Overseas player: (Australia) Piepa Cleary
- RHFT: 6th
- CEC: Group B, 4th
- Most runs: RHFT: Kathryn Bryce (233); CEC: Tammy Beaumont (136)
- Most wickets: RHFT: Grace Ballinger (9) & Kirstie Gordon (9); CEC: Piepa Cleary (7)
- Most catches: RHFT: Kathryn Bryce (5); CEC: Tammy Beaumont (3) & Sophie Munro (3)
- Most wicket-keeping dismissals: RHFT: Sarah Bryce (4); CEC: Sarah Bryce (5)

The 2022 season was Lightning's third season, in which they competed in the 50 over Rachael Heyhoe Flint Trophy and the Twenty20 Charlotte Edwards Cup. In the Charlotte Edwards Cup, the side finished bottom of Group B, winning one of their six matches. The side finished sixth in the Rachael Heyhoe Flint Trophy, winning two of their six matches.

The side was captained by Kathryn Bryce and coached by Chris Guest. They played three home matches at the Haslegrave Ground, two at Grace Road and one apiece at Trent Bridge and the County Ground, Derby.

In September 2022, it was announced that Nottinghamshire CCC would become the new host of the team from the 2023 season, replacing Loughborough University, and that the name and branding of the team would be changing.

== Squad ==
=== Changes ===
On 29 October 2021, it was announced that Lightning had signed Marie Kelly from Central Sparks, and that she had signed a professional contract with the side. On the same day, Abigail Freeborn left the side, joining Central Sparks. On 29 April 2022, it was announced that Yvonne Graves had left the side, joining Northern Diamonds. On 11 May 2022, Lightning announced their 18-player squad for the season, confirming the signing of Katie Midwood from Sunrisers, Piepa Cleary as an overseas player, and Ilenia Sims from the Academy. Shachi Pai departed the side for North West Thunder, Nancy Harman moved to Southern Vipers, and Sonia Odedra and Leah Kellogg were no longer included in the squad compared to the previous season. In July 2022, Emily Windsor joined the side on loan from Southern Vipers for the first match of the Rachael Heyhoe Flint Trophy. Later in July, Gwenan Davies was signed on loan from Central Sparks for two matches the Rachael Heyhoe Flint Trophy. Academy player Rhiannon Knowling-Davies was first named in a matchday squad on 16 July 2022. In September, Georgie Boyce joined the side from North West Thunder.

On 20 October 2021, it was announced that Head Coach Rob Taylor was leaving the club. Chris Guest was announced his replacement on 1 December 2021.

=== Squad list ===
- Age given is at the start of Lightning's first match of the season (14 May 2022).

Name	Nationality	Birth date	Batting Style	Bowling Style	Notes
Batters
Georgie Boyce	England	4 October 1998 (aged 23)	Right-handed	Right-arm medium	Joined September 2022 from North West Thunder
Bethany Harmer	England	30 October 2000 (aged 21)	Right-handed	Right-arm off break	
Marie Kelly	England	9 February 1996 (aged 26)	Right-handed	Right-arm off break	
Emily Windsor	England	14 June 1997 (aged 24)	Right-handed	Right-arm medium	One match loan from Southern Vipers in July 2022
All-rounders
Kathryn Bryce	Scotland	17 November 1997 (aged 24)	Right-handed	Right-arm medium	Captain
Piepa Cleary	Australia	17 July 1996 (aged 25)	Right-handed	Right-arm medium	Overseas player
Bethan Ellis	England	7 July 1999 (aged 22)	Right-handed	Right-arm medium	
Teresa Graves	England	10 October 1998 (aged 23)	Right-handed	Right-arm medium	
Katie Midwood	England	1 October 1993 (aged 28)	Right-handed	Slow left-arm orthodox	
Wicket-keepers
Tammy Beaumont	England	11 March 1991 (aged 31)	Right-handed	—	
Sarah Bryce	Scotland	8 January 2000 (aged 22)	Right-handed	—	
Ella Claridge	England	28 September 2002 (aged 19)	Right-handed	—	
Gwenan Davies	Wales	12 May 1994 (aged 28)	Left-handed	Right-arm medium	Two match loan from Central Sparks in July 2022
Michaela Kirk	South Africa	30 June 1999 (aged 22)	Right-handed	Right-arm off break	
Bowlers
Grace Ballinger	England	3 April 2002 (aged 20)	Left-handed	Left-arm medium	
Kirstie Gordon	England	20 October 1997 (aged 24)	Right-handed	Slow left-arm orthodox	
Josie Groves	England	5 September 2004 (aged 17)	Right-handed	Right-arm leg break	
Lucy Higham	England	17 October 1997 (aged 24)	Right-handed	Right-arm off break	
Rhiannon Knowling-Davies	England	Unknown	Right-handed	Right-arm medium	Joined July 2022
Sophie Munro	England	31 August 2001 (aged 20)	Right-handed	Right-arm medium	
Alicia Presland	England	28 September 1999 (aged 22)	Right-handed	Right-arm medium	
Ilenia Sims	England	10 February 2002 (aged 20)	Right-handed	Right-arm off break	

== Charlotte Edwards Cup ==
=== Group B ===
Pos	Team	Pld	W	L	T	NR	BP	Pts	NRR
1	Southern Vipers (Q)	6	6	0	0	0	3	27	1.400
2	Northern Diamonds	6	3	3	0	0	2	14	−0.102
3	North West Thunder	6	2	4	0	0	2	10	−0.190
4	Lightning	6	1	5	0	0	0	4	−1.072

Source: England and Wales Cricket Board
- advanced to the final

=== Fixtures ===
14 May 2022
14:30 BST
Scorecard

Northern Diamonds; 177/5 (20 overs)	v	Lightning; 138/7 (20 overs)
Lauren Winfield-Hill 96 (51); Kathryn Bryce 2/44 (4 overs)		Tammy Beaumont 59 (49); Emma Marlow 2/12 (4 overs)

Northern Diamonds won by 39 runs
Haslegrave Ground, Loughborough
Umpires: Grace Bambury and Sue Redfern

- Northern Diamonds won the toss and elected to bat.
- Points: Northern Diamonds 5, Lightning 0

18 May 2022
18:30 BST (D/N)
Scorecard

Southern Vipers; 155/5 (20 overs)	v	Lightning; 124/8 (20 overs)
Maia Bouchier 41 (34); Marie Kelly 2/17 (3 overs)		Kathryn Bryce 54 (51); Lauren Bell 3/12 (4 overs)

Southern Vipers won by 31 runs
Rose Bowl, Southampton
Umpires: Rob White and Sarah Bartlett

- Lightning won the toss and elected to field.
- Points: Southern Vipers 5, Lightning 0

21 May 2022
14:30 BST
Scorecard

North West Thunder; 152/5 (20 overs)	v	Lightning; 155/5 (18.5 overs)
Georgie Boyce 71 (56); Piepa Cleary 3/34 (4 overs)		Tammy Beaumont 59 (38); Alex Hartley 1/13 (4 overs)

Lightning won by 5 wickets
Grace Road, Leicester
Umpires: Anna Harris and Rob White

- North West Thunder won the toss and elected to bat.
- Points: Lightning 4, North West Thunder 0

29 May 2022
11:00 BST
Scorecard

Lightning; 141 (19.4 overs)	v	Southern Vipers; 142/5 (16.4 overs)
Marie Kelly 36 (12); Georgia Elwiss 3/28 (4 overs)		Danni Wyatt 76 (44); Lucy Higham 3/30 (3 overs)

Southern Vipers won by 5 wickets
Trent Bridge, Nottingham
Umpires: Jasmine Naeem and Russell Warren

- Lightning won the toss and elected to bat.
- Points: Southern Vipers 4, Lightning 0

1 June 2022
14:15 BST
Scorecard

Northern Diamonds; 145/5 (20 overs)	v	Lightning; 140 (19.5 overs)
Bess Heath 60 (46); Piepa Cleary 2/24 (4 overs)		Ella Claridge 41 (36); Hollie Armitage 4/27 (4 overs)

Northern Diamonds won by 5 runs
Riverside Ground, Chester-le-Street
Umpires: Jane Pratt and Neil Pratt

- Northern Diamonds won the toss and elected to bat.
- Points: Northern Diamonds 4, Lightning 0

3 June 2022
14:30 BST
Scorecard

Lightning; 103 (18 overs)	v	North West Thunder; 104/5 (15.2 overs)
Marie Kelly 21 (8); Sophie Ecclestone 5/15 (4 overs)		Emma Lamb 42 (35); Kathryn Bryce 2/24 (4 overs)

North West Thunder won by 5 wickets
Old Trafford Cricket Ground, Manchester
Umpires: Jasmine Naeem and Neil Pratt

- Lightning won the toss and elected to bat.
- Points: North West Thunder 5, Lightning 0

=== Tournament statistics ===
==== Batting ====
Player	Matches	Innings	Runs	Average	High score	100s	50s
Tammy Beaumont	4	4	136	34.00	59	0	2
Kathryn Bryce	6	6	129	21.50	54	0	1
Marie Kelly	6	6	111	18.50	46	0	0
Ella Claridge	5	5	83	20.75	41	0	0
Lucy Higham	6	5	51	12.75	31	0	0

Source: ESPN Cricinfo Qualification: 50 runs.

==== Bowling ====
Player	Matches	Overs	Wickets	Average	Economy	BBI	5wi
Piepa Cleary	5	18.2	7	18.14	6.92	3/34	0
Kathryn Bryce	6	20.0	5	35.40	8.85	2/24	0

Source: ESPN Cricinfo Qualification: 5 wickets.

== Rachael Heyhoe Flint Trophy ==
=== Season standings ===
Pos	Team	Pld	W	L	T	NR	BP	Pts	NRR
1	Northern Diamonds (Q)	7	6	0	0	1	2	28	0.851
2	South East Stars (Q)	7	5	1	0	1	4	26	0.687
3	Southern Vipers (Q)	7	5	1	0	1	2	24	0.762
4	Western Storm	7	3	3	0	1	1	15	−0.214
5	Central Sparks	7	2	4	0	1	1	11	0.073
6	Lightning	7	2	4	0	1	1	11	−0.630
7	North West Thunder	7	1	5	0	1	0	6	−0.366
8	Sunrisers	7	0	6	0	1	0	2	−1.046

Source: England and Wales Cricket Board

advanced to final advanced to the play-off

=== Fixtures ===
2 July 2022
10:30 BST
Scorecard

Western Storm; 260/9 (50 overs)	v	Lightning; 166/9 (34.2 overs)
Sophie Luff 48 (66); Piepa Cleary 3/45 (10 overs)		Lucy Higham 34 (39); Lauren Filer 3/35 (8 overs)

Western Storm won by 75 runs (DLS)
Haslegrave Ground, Loughborough
Umpires: Jasmine Naeem and Naeem Ashraf

- Lightning won the toss and elected to field.
- Lightning innings curtailed at 34.2 overs due to rain; target was 242.
- Points: Western Storm 5, Lightning 0

9 July 2022
10:30 BST
Scorecard

North West Thunder; 238/9 (50 overs)	v	Lightning; 241/5 (49.1 overs)
Eleanor Threlkeld 91 (117); Grace Ballinger 5/29 (10 overs)		Kathryn Bryce 109* (133); Laura Jackson 1/34 (8 overs)

Lightning won by 5 wickets
Haslegrave Ground, Loughborough
Umpires: Joanne Ibbotson and Surendiran Shanmugam

- North West Thunder won the toss and elected to bat.
- Points: Lightning 4, North West Thunder 0

16 July 2022
10:30 BST
Scorecard

Southern Vipers; 294/6 (50 overs)	v	Lightning; 228 (44 overs)
Georgia Adams 82 (93); Josie Groves 2/34 (6 overs)		Josie Groves 55 (39); Charlotte Taylor 3/31 (10 overs)

Southern Vipers won by 66 runs
County Ground, Derby
Umpires: Jasmine Naeem and Surendiran Shanmugam

- Southern Vipers won the toss and elected to bat.
- Points: Southern Vipers 5, Lightning 0

23 July 2022
10:30 BST
Scorecard

Lightning; 199 (49.1 overs)	v	Northern Diamonds; 200/9 (49.4 overs)
Tammy Beaumont 70 (105); Leigh Kasperek 3/39 (10 overs)		Lauren Winfield-Hill 61 (75); Lucy Higham 3/50 (10 overs)

Northern Diamonds won by 1 wicket
Riverside Ground, Chester-le-Street
Umpires: Naeem Ashraf and Surenidran Shanmugam

- Lightning won the toss and elected to bat.
- Points: Northern Diamonds 4, Lightning 0

9 September 2022
10:30 BST

Central Sparks	v	Lightning

No Result
New Road, Worcester

- The match was postponed due to the death of Queen Elizabeth II, and later deemed a no result with points shared.
- Points: Central Sparks 2, Lightning 2

11 September 2022
10:30 BST
Scorecard

Lightning; 230/9 (50 overs)	v	Sunrisers; 160 (41 overs)
Kathryn Bryce 104 (109); Jo Gardner 3/45 (10 overs)		Grace Scrivens 54 (65); Kirstie Gordon 4/31 (10 overs)

Lightning won by 70 runs
County Ground, Chelmsford
Umpires: Neil Bainton and Rose Dovey

- Sunrisers won the toss and elected to field.
- Points: Lightning 5, Sunrisers 0

17 September 2022
10:30 BST
Scorecard

South East Stars; 281/9 (50 overs)	v	Lightning; 169 (38.4 overs)
Bryony Smith 114 (102); Grace Ballinger 3/62 (10 overs)		Georgie Boyce 70 (83); Eva Gray 3/29 (6 overs)

South East Stars won by 112 runs
Grace Road, Leicester
Umpires: Hassan Adnan and Rose Dovey

- South East Stars won the toss and elected to bat.
- Points: South East Stars 5, Lightning 0

=== Tournament statistics ===
==== Batting ====
Player	Matches	Innings	Runs	Average	High score	100s	50s
Kathryn Bryce	5	5	233	58.25	109*	2	0
Sarah Bryce	5	5	115	23.00	49	0	0
Lucy Higham	5	5	109	18.16	34	0	0
Sophie Munro	5	5	108	21.60	50	0	1

Source: ESPN Cricinfo Qualification: 100 runs.

==== Bowling ====
Player	Matches	Overs	Wickets	Average	Economy	BBI	5wi
Grace Ballinger	5	40.0	9	17.77	4.00	5/29	1
Kirstie Gordon	4	40.0	9	17.77	4.00	4/31	0
Lucy Higham	6	46.0	8	29.87	5.19	3/50	0
Piepa Cleary	3	28.0	6	25.33	5.42	3/45	0
Josie Groves	5	25.0	5	26.20	5.24	2/31	0

Source: ESPN Cricinfo Qualification: 5 wickets.

== Season statistics ==
=== Batting ===
Player	Rachael Heyhoe Flint Trophy								Charlotte Edwards Cup							
Player	Matches	Innings	Runs	High score	Average	Strike rate	100s	50s	Matches	Innings	Runs	High score	Average	Strike rate	100s	50s
Grace Ballinger	5	4	15	13*	15.00	45.45	0	0	5	3	10	7	3.33	90.90	0	0
Tammy Beaumont	2	2	82	70	41.00	62.12	0	1	4	4	136	59	34.00	125.92	0	2
Georgie Boyce	2	2	73	70	36.50	76.04	0	1	–	–	–	–	–	–	–	–
Kathryn Bryce	5	5	233	109*	58.25	82.33	2	0	6	6	129	54	21.50	92.80	0	1
Sarah Bryce	5	5	115	49	23.00	62.16	0	0	5	5	44	23*	11.00	78.57	0	0
Ella Claridge	1	1	35	35	35.00	70.00	0	0	5	5	83	41	20.75	113.69	0	0
Piepa Cleary	3	3	18	13*	9.00	62.06	0	0	5	4	16	9*	8.00	64.00	0	0
Gwenan Davies	2	2	9	5	4.50	30.00	0	0	–	–	–	–	–	–	–	–
Bethan Ellis	3	3	33	33	11.00	63.46	0	0	6	6	41	19*	8.20	91.11	0	0
Kirstie Gordon	4	4	17	8	8.50	58.62	0	0	2	1	11	11*	–	137.50	0	0
Teresa Graves	4	3	34	26*	34.00	50.74	0	0	5	5	17	7	4.25	56.66	0	0
Josie Groves	5	4	62	55	15.50	124.00	0	1	3	2	1	1*	1.00	33.33	0	0
Bethany Harmer	5	5	63	27	12.60	77.77	0	0	2	2	42	35	21.00	123.52	0	0
Lucy Higham	6	6	109	34	18.16	74.65	0	0	6	5	51	31	12.75	92.72	0	0
Marie Kelly	5	4	86	46	21.50	69.35	0	0	6	6	111	46	18.50	152.05	0	0
Michaela Kirk	2	2	7	6	3.50	38.88	0	0	–	–	–	–	–	–	–	–
Sophie Munro	5	5	108	50	21.60	76.05	0	1	6	5	44	16	8.80	104.76	0	0
Alicia Presland	1	1	1	1	1.00	16.66	0	0	1	–	–	–	–	–	–	–
Emily Windsor	1	1	27	27	27.00	58.69	0	0	–	–	–	–	–	–	–	–
Source: ESPN Cricinfo

=== Bowling ===
Player	Rachael Heyhoe Flint Trophy							Charlotte Edwards Cup						
Player	Matches	Overs	Wickets	Average	Economy	BBI	5wi	Matches	Overs	Wickets	Average	Economy	BBI	5wi
Grace Ballinger	5	40.0	9	17.77	4.00	5/29	1	5	12.4	1	100.00	7.89	1/10	0
Kathryn Bryce	5	38.0	4	44.25	4.65	2/26	0	6	20.0	5	35.40	8.85	2/24	0
Piepa Cleary	3	28.0	6	25.33	5.42	3/45	0	5	18.2	7	18.14	6.92	3/34	0
Bethan Ellis	3	–	–	–	–	–	–	6	0.2	0	–	3.00	–	0
Kirstie Gordon	4	40.0	9	17.77	4.00	4/31	0	2	8.0	2	20.50	5.12	1/15	0
Teresa Graves	4	23.0	2	57.50	5.00	1/23	0	5	3.0	1	25.00	8.33	1/15	0
Josie Groves	5	25.0	5	26.20	5.24	2/31	0	3	9.0	3	24.33	8.11	1/20	0
Lucy Higham	6	46.0	8	29.87	5.19	3/50	0	6	11.0	4	22.50	8.18	3/30	0
Marie Kelly	5	17.4	3	22.66	3.84	1/19	0	6	14.4	3	40.00	8.18	2/17	0
Sophie Munro	5	29.0	3	52.00	5.37	2/35	0	6	15.0	3	37.00	7.40	2/25	0
Alicia Presland	1	4.0	0	–	6.75	–	0	1	–	–	–	–	–	–
Source: ESPN Cricinfo

=== Fielding ===
Player	Rachael Heyhoe Flint Trophy			Charlotte Edwards Cup		
Player	Matches	Innings	Catches	Matches	Innings	Catches
Grace Ballinger	5	5	2	5	5	0
Tammy Beaumont	2	2	0	4	4	3
Georgie Boyce	2	2	1	–	–	–
Kathryn Bryce	5	5	5	6	6	2
Ella Claridge	1	–	–	5	4	1
Piepa Cleary	3	3	2	5	5	0
Gwenan Davies	2	2	0	–	–	–
Bethan Ellis	3	3	0	6	6	2
Kirstie Gordon	4	4	3	2	2	1
Teresa Graves	4	4	0	5	5	1
Josie Groves	5	5	3	3	3	0
Bethany Harmer	5	5	0	2	2	0
Lucy Higham	6	6	2	6	5	0
Marie Kelly	5	5	1	6	6	2
Michaela Kirk	2	2	0	–	–	–
Sophie Munro	5	5	0	6	6	3
Alicia Presland	1	1	0	1	1	0
Emily Windsor	1	1	0	–	–	–
Source: ESPN Cricinfo

=== Wicket-keeping ===
Player	Rachael Heyhoe Flint Trophy				Charlotte Edwards Cup			
Player	Matches	Innings	Catches	Stumpings	Matches	Innings	Catches	Stumpings
Sarah Bryce	5	5	2	2	5	5	2	3
Ella Claridge	1	1	1	0	5	1	0	0
Source: ESPN Cricinfo
