= Scarlett Hughes =

English cricketer (born 2002)

Personal information
- Full name: Scarlett Talulla Ava Hughes
- Born: 18 June 2002 (age 24); Cambridge, England
- Batting: Left-handed
- Role: Wicket-keeper

Domestic team information
- Years: Team
- 2017–2024: Essex
- 2020: Sunrisers
- 2022–2023: Sunrisers
- 2025–present: The Blaze
- 2025: → Leicestershire (on loan)

Career statistics
Competition	WLA	WT20
Matches	12	32
Runs scored	48	386
Batting average	6.00	16.78
100s/50s	0/0	0/2
Top score	15	70
Catches/stumpings	11/4	14/15
- Source: CricketArchive, 19 October 2024

Scarlett Talulla Ava Hughes (born 18 June 2002) is an English cricketer who currently plays for Leicestershire, on loan from The Blaze. She plays as a wicket-keeper and left-handed batter. She has previously played for Essex and Sunrisers.

== Early life ==
Hughes was born on 18 June 2002 in Cambridge. She was diagnosed with Type 1 diabetes when she was 10 years old.

== Domestic career ==
Hughes made her county debut in 2017, for Essex against Cambridgeshire and Huntingdonshire in the County Championship. She became a regular for the side in 2019, and made 12 dismissals that season. She scored 63 runs for the side in the 2021 Women's Twenty20 Cup, including scoring 46 against Surrey. In the 2022 Women's Twenty20 Cup, she was the 7th highest run-scorer across the whole competition with 233 runs, including two half-centuries and her Twenty20 high score, of 70 against Cambridgeshire. She played three matches for the side in the 2023 Women's Twenty20 Cup, scoring 47 runs.

Hughes was named in the Sunrisers squad for the 2020 Rachael Heyhoe Flint Trophy, but did not play a match for the side that season. She was moved to the side's Academy squad for the 2021 season. She returned to the Sunrisers squad in 2022. She made her debut for the side on 14 May 2022, against South East Stars in the Charlotte Edwards Cup. She played seven matches for the side overall in 2022, across the Charlotte Edwards Cup and the Rachael Heyhoe Flint Trophy, scoring 20 runs. She was included in the Sunrisers squad for 2023, but did not play a match.

In December 2023, it was announced that Hughes had signed for The Blaze.

In June 2025, she joined Leicestershire on an open-ended dual-registration loan.
