= Cassidy McCarthy =

English cricketer (born 2002)

Personal information
- Full name: Cassidy Mae McCarthy
- Born: 23 July 2002 (age 24); Crowborough, East Sussex, England
- Batting: Right-handed
- Bowling: Right-arm medium
- Role: Bowler

Domestic team information
- Years: Team
- 2017–2024: Sussex
- 2020–2021: Southern Vipers
- 2023–present: The Blaze
- 2023–2025: Trent Rockets
- 2026-present: Sunrisers Leeds

Career statistics
Competition	WLA	WT20
Matches	24	25
Runs scored	67	14
Batting average	6.70	3.50
100s/50s	12	0/0
Top score	0/0	10
Balls bowled	556	200
Wickets	13	10
Bowling average	34.69	22.50
5 wickets in innings	0	0
10 wickets in match	0	0
Best bowling	3/17	4/28
Catches/stumpings	7/–	6/–
- Source: CricketArchive, 19 October 2024

Cassidy Mae McCarthy (born 23 July 2002) is an English cricketer who currently plays for The Blaze and Sunrisers Leeds. A right-arm medium bowler, McCarthy has previously played for Sussex, Southern Vipers and Trent Rockets.

== Early life ==
McCarthy was born on 23 July 2002 in Crowborough, East Sussex and attended St Gregory's Catholic School in Royal Tunbridge Wells. She studies at Loughborough University. Her father was former Republic of Ireland under-21 international footballer Paul McCarthy.

== Domestic career ==
McCarthy made her county debut in 2017, for Sussex against Berkshire. She took six wickets at an average of 19.50 in the 2019 Women's County Championship. In the 2021 Women's Twenty20 Cup, she took 4/28 from her four overs in a match against Middlesex.

McCarthy was named in the Southern Vipers squad in 2020 and 2021, but did not play a match for the side in either season. She was moved to the side's Academy squad for the 2022 season. In November 2022, it was announced that McCarthy had signed a winter retainer contract at The Blaze. She made her debut for the side on 7 July 2023, against Northern Diamonds in the Rachael Heyhoe Flint Trophy. She played two matches overall for the side that season, taking two wickets. She also played two matches for Trent Rockets in The Hundred. In 2024, she played 12 matches for The Blaze, all in the Rachael Heyhoe Flint Trophy, taking 5 wickets. McCarthy signed a new two-year contract with The Blaze in August 2024. She agreed a one-year extension with The Blaze in April 2026 and was selected by Sunrisers Leeds on a £65,000 fee for that year's edition of The Hundred.
