= Josie Groves =

English cricketer (born 2004)

Personal information
- Full name: Josephine Paige Groves
- Born: 5 September 2004 (age 22); Milton Keynes, Buckinghamshire, England
- Batting: Right-handed
- Bowling: Right-arm leg break
- Role: Bowler

Domestic team information
- Years: Team
- 2019–2024: Northamptonshire
- 2021–2026: The Blaze
- 2023–2024: Trent Rockets
- 2025-2025: Southern Brave
- 2026- Present: London Spirit
- 2026- present: Lancashire Women

Career statistics
| Competition | WLA | WT20 |
|---|---|---|
| Matches | 22 | 47 |
| Runs scored | 115 | 257 |
| Batting average | 10.45 | 13.52 |
| 100s/50s | 0/1 | 0/1 |
| Top score | 55 | 68 |
| Balls bowled | 792 | 625 |
| Wickets | 25 | 40 |
| Bowling average | 28.48 | 14.35 |
| 5 wickets in innings | 0 | 0 |
| 10 wickets in match | 0 | 0 |
| Best bowling | 3/39 | 3/7 |
| Catches/stumpings | 7/– | 9/– |
- Source: CricketArchive, 19 October 2024

Josephine Paige Groves (born 5 September 2004) is an English cricketer who currently plays for Lancashire Women. She plays as a right-arm leg break bowler.

== Domestic career ==
Groves made her county debut in 2019, for Northamptonshire against Cambridgeshire and Huntingdonshire. She took 5 wickets for her side in the Twenty20 Cup that season, at an average of 15.20. She again took 5 wickets for Northamptonshire in the 2021 Women's Twenty20 Cup, including best figures of 3/14 taken against Derbyshire. She took seven wickets for the side in the 2022 Women's Twenty20 Cup, at an average of 11.42. In the 2023 Women's Twenty20 Cup, she took 10 wickets at an average of 5.00, and scored her maiden Twenty20 half-century, with 68 against Suffolk.

Groves was named as part of the Lightning Academy for the 2021 season, and took 4/19 for the side in a match against Central Sparks Academy. She was added to the full squad in August 2021, and made her debut for the side on 10 September, against South East Stars in the Rachael Heyhoe Flint Trophy. She went on to play eight matches for Lightning in 2022, across the Charlotte Edwards Cup and the Rachael Heyhoe Flint Trophy, taking eight wickets. She also scored her maiden half-century, against Southern Vipers in the Rachael Heyhoe Flint Trophy, scoring 55 from 39 deliveries. In February 2023, it was announced that Groves had signed her first professional contract with Lightning, now known as The Blaze.

In 2023, she played nine matches for The Blaze, across the Rachael Heyhoe Flint Trophy and the Charlotte Edwards Cup, and took 12 wickets in the Rachael Heyhoe Flint Trophy at an average of 20.50, including taking 3/39 in the final against Southern Vipers. She was also signed by Trent Rockets for The Hundred, but did not play a match. In 2024, she played 20 matches for The Blaze, across the Rachael Heyhoe Flint Trophy and the Charlotte Edwards Cup, taking 17 wickets.

== International career ==
In October 2022, Groves was selected in the England Under-19 squad for the 2023 ICC Under-19 Women's T20 World Cup. She played five matches in the tournament, taking three wickets at an average of 18.00.
