= Sophie Munro =

English cricketer (born 2001)

Personal information
- Full name: Sophie Elizabeth Naseem Munro
- Born: 31 August 2001 (age 25); Lincoln, England
- Batting: Right-handed
- Bowling: Right-arm medium
- Role: Bowler

Domestic team information
- Years: Team
- 2017–present: Nottinghamshire
- 2018: Yorkshire Diamonds
- 2020–2024: The Blaze
- 2024: → Sunrisers (on loan)
- 2021: London Spirit
- 2022: Trent Rockets
- 2023–present: London Spirit

Career statistics
Competition	WLA	WT20
Matches	59	78
Runs scored	444	294
Batting average	14.80	8.90
100s/50s	0/1	0/1
Top score	50	59*
Balls bowled	2,070	1,165
Wickets	72	59
Bowling average	20.90	22.23
5 wickets in innings	2	0
10 wickets in match	0	0
Best bowling	5/24	4/23
Catches/stumpings	9/–	15/–
- Source: CricketArchive, 19 October 2024

Sophie Elizabeth Naseem Munro (born 31 August 2001) is an English cricketer who most recently played for Nottinghamshire, The Blaze and London Spirit. She plays as a right-arm medium bowler. She previously played for Sunrisers, as well as Yorkshire Diamonds in the 2018 Women's Cricket Super League and Trent Rockets in The Hundred.

== Domestic career ==
Munro made her county debut in 2017, for Nottinghamshire against Middlesex, in which she took 5/24 from 7.1 overs. She then took 4/28 in her second match the following day against Berkshire, making it 9 wickets across her first weekend playing county cricket. In 2019, Munro was Nottinghamshire's leading wicket-taker (and joint fifth overall) in the 2019 Women's County Championship, with 14 wickets at an average of 17.85. She took six wickets for Nottinghamshire in the 2021 Women's Twenty20 Cup, helping the side win the East Midlands Group of the competition. She took five wickets for the side in the 2022 Women's Twenty20 Cup, as well as hitting her maiden Twenty20 half-century, 59* against Derbyshire.

Munro was also part of the Yorkshire Diamonds squad in the 2018 Women's Cricket Super League. She played one match, against Loughborough Lightning, but did not bat or bowl.

In 2020, Munro played for Lightning in the Rachael Heyhoe Flint Trophy. She appeared in five matches, taking 4 wickets with a best of 3/32 in the side's first match against North West Thunder. In 2021, she took six wickets at an average of 29.66 for the side in the Rachael Heyhoe Flint Trophy, as well as a further six wickets in the Charlotte Edwards Cup. She also played five matches for London Spirit in The Hundred, taking three wickets at an average of 37.00. She played eleven matches for Lightning in 2022, across the Charlotte Edwards Cup and the Rachael Heyhoe Flint Trophy, taking six wickets. She also hit her maiden List A half-century, scoring 50 against North West Thunder in the Rachael Heyhoe Flint Trophy. In The Hundred, Munro moved to Trent Rockets, playing four matches. In November 2022, it was confirmed that Munro had signed a professional contract with Lightning, now known as The Blaze.

In 2023, she played 17 matches for The Blaze, across the Rachael Heyhoe Flint Trophy and the Charlotte Edwards Cup, taking 14 wickets. She also returned to London Spirit in The Hundred, playing three matches and taking two wickets at an average of 16.00.

In May 2024, it was announced that she was going on loan to Sunrisers for the 2024 Charlotte Edwards Cup. Munro's loan was later extended until the end of July, and later extended again until the end of the season. She played 15 matches for Sunrisers, across the Rachael Heyhoe Flint Trophy and the Charlotte Edwards Cup, taking 26 wickets with a best bowling of 5/25. She also played five matches for The Blaze in the Rachael Heyhoe Flint Trophy, taking eight wickets at an average of 15.50, making her the joint-second highest wicket-taker in the tournament.

In October 2024, Munro signed for Essex Women ahead of the 2025 women's domestic cricket restructure.
