= Grace Ballinger =

English cricketer (born 2002)

Personal information
- Full name: Grace Ballinger
- Born: 3 April 2002 (age 24); Birmingham, England
- Batting: Left-handed
- Bowling: Left-arm medium
- Role: Bowler

Domestic team information
- Years: Team
- 2018–2020: Warwickshire
- 2020–present: The Blaze
- 2021–2024: Leicestershire
- 2022: London Spirit
- 2023–present: Northern Superchargers

Career statistics
Competition	WLA	WT20
Matches	38	67
Runs scored	128	252
Batting average	16.00	15.75
100s/50s	0/0	0/2
Top score	25	59*
Balls bowled	1,642	1,101
Wickets	48	44
Bowling average	27.14	26.79
5 wickets in innings	1	0
10 wickets in match	0	0
Best bowling	5/29	3/6
Catches/stumpings	9/–	5/–
- Source: CricketArchive, 19 October 2024

Grace Ballinger (born 3 April 2002) is an English cricketer who currently plays for The Blaze and Manchester Super Giants. She plays as a left-arm medium bowler. She previously played for Leicestershire, Warwickshire and London Spirit.

== Early life ==
Ballinger was born on 3 April 2002 in Birmingham. She studies English Literature at Loughborough University.

== Domestic career ==
Ballinger made her county debut in 2018, for Warwickshire against Sussex. She played four matches in the Twenty20 Cup that season, with her best performance coming against Middlesex, in which she took 2/30. The following season, she played two matches as Warwickshire won the 2019 Women's Twenty20 Cup. In 2021, it was announced that Ballinger had signed for Leicestershire. She played five matches for the side in the Twenty20 Cup that season, scoring 71 runs and taking 2 wickets. In the 2022 Women's Twenty20 Cup, she was Leicestershire's leading run-scorer and leading wicket-taker, with 156 runs and 10 wickets. She scored two half-centuries, against Lincolnshire and Northamptonshire, as well as taking her Twenty20 best bowling figures of 3/6, also against Lincolnshire.

In 2020, Ballinger played for Lightning in the Rachael Heyhoe Flint Trophy. She appeared in three matches, scoring 5 runs and bowling 11 overs for no wicket. In 2021, she took seven wickets for the side across the Rachael Heyhoe Flint Trophy and the Charlotte Edwards Cup. She played ten matches for the side in 2022, across the Charlotte Edwards Cup and the Rachael Heyhoe Flint Trophy, and took nine wickets at an average of 17.77 in the Rachael Heyhoe Flint Trophy. Against North West Thunder in the Rachael Heyhoe Flint Trophy, Ballinger took her maiden five-wicket haul, returning figures of 5/29. She also played two matches for London Spirit in The Hundred. In February 2023, it was announced that Ballinger had signed her first professional contract with Lightning, now known as The Blaze.

In 2023, she played 21 matches for The Blaze, across the Rachael Heyhoe Flint Trophy and the Charlotte Edwards Cup, and was the side's leading wicket-taker in the Rachael Heyhoe Flint Trophy, with 18 wickets at an average of 23.44. She also played 10 matches for Northern Superchargers in The Hundred, taking 5 wickets. In 2024, she played 26 matches for The Blaze, across the Rachael Heyhoe Flint Trophy and the Charlotte Edwards Cup, taking 28 wickets with a best bowling of 4/23.
