= Bethany Harmer =

English cricketer

Personal information
- Full name: Bethany Charlotte Harmer
- Born: 30 October 2000 (age 26); Norwich, Norfolk, England
- Batting: Right-handed
- Bowling: Right-arm off break
- Role: All-rounder

Domestic team information
- Years: Team
- 2015–2018: Norfolk
- 2019–2021: Essex
- 2020–2024: The Blaze
- 2021: Lincolnshire
- 2022–present: Derbyshire
- 2022: Northern Superchargers

Career statistics
Competition	WLA	WT20
Matches	36	45
Runs scored	455	675
Batting average	12.63	16.46
100s/50s	0/1	0/1
Top score	60	70
Balls bowled	443	270
Wickets	12	15
Bowling average	26.08	12.87
5 wickets in innings	0	0
10 wickets in match	0	0
Best bowling	4/18	3/7
Catches/stumpings	11/–	14/–
- Source: CricketArchive, 19 October 2024

Bethany Charlotte Harmer (born 30 October 2000) is an English cricketer who currently plays for Derbyshire. An all-rounder, she is a right-handed batter and right-arm off break bowler. She previously played for Norfolk, Essex, Lincolnshire and The Blaze.

== Early life ==
Harmer was born on 30 October 2000 in Norwich, Norfolk.

== Domestic career ==
Harmer made her county debut in 2015, for Norfolk against Cumbria, in which she took 4/18, which remains her List A best bowling figures. She ended the season as Norfolk's joint-leading wicket-taker in the County Championship, with 6 wickets. The following season she achieved her List A high score, hitting 60 against the Netherlands, and was her side's leading run-scorer in the County Championship. She also scored 175 runs at an average of 29.16 in the 2016 Women's Twenty20 Cup. In 2017, she achieved her Twenty20 best bowling figures, taking 3/7 against Cambridgeshire.

Ahead of the 2019 season, Harmer joined Essex, helping them to third place in Division 2 of the County Championship. After the 2020 season was cancelled, Harmer played for Lincolnshire in the 2021 Women's Twenty20 Cup, playing three matches, scoring 93 runs and taking 4 wickets. She continued to play for Essex in the Women's London Championship. Harmer joined Derbyshire for the 2022 season. In Derbyshire's victory over Yorkshire, she scored her maiden Twenty20 half-century, 70 from 35 balls.

Harmer was named in the Lightning squad for the 2020 Rachael Heyhoe Flint Trophy, but did not play a match. She made her debut for the side in 2021, in the opening match of the Charlotte Edwards Cup against South East Stars, in which she made 34 from 25 balls. She went on to play five more matches in the Charlotte Edwards Cup, scoring 70 runs overall, as well as three matches in the Rachael Heyhoe Flint Trophy. She played seven matches for Lightning in 2022, across the Charlotte Edwards Cup and the Rachael Heyhoe Flint Trophy, scoring 105 runs. She was also in the Northern Superchargers squad for The Hundred, but did not play a match. In 2023, she played two matches for The Blaze (the new name for Lightning). In 2024, she played two matches for The Blaze. Harmer left The Blaze when her contract expired in October 2024.
