= Hassan Adnan =

Cricketer and umpire (born 1974)

Personal information
- Full name: Hassan Adnan
- Born: 15 May 1974 (age 52); Lahore, Punjab, Pakistan
- Nickname: Hass
- Batting: Right-handed
- Bowling: Right-arm offbreak

Domestic team information
- Years: Team
- 1994/95: Islamabad
- 1997/98–2004/05: Water and Power Development Authority
- 1997/98–1998/99: Gujranwala
- 2000/01: Islamabad
- 2003–2007: Derbyshire
- 2003/04: Lahore
- 2009/10: Pakistan Customs
- 2010/11: Water and Power Development Authority

Umpiring information
- FC umpired: 46 (2019–present)
- LA umpired: 25 (2021–present)
- T20 umpired: 46 (2020–present)

Career statistics
Competition	FC	LA	T20
Matches	137	73	11
Runs scored	7,609	1,875	167
Batting average	37.11	30.73	23.85
100s/50s	10/51	2/14	0/1
Top score	191	113*	54*
Balls bowled	481	187	54
Wickets	4	6	2
Bowling average	88.00	27.00	34.00
5 wickets in innings	0	0	0
10 wickets in match	0	0	0
Best bowling	1/4	2/13	1/18
Catches/stumpings	76/–	26/–	4/–
- Source: Cricinfo, 8 August 2023

Hassan Adnan (Urdu: محمد حسن عدنان), (born 15 May 1974, in Lahore) is a Pakistani former cricketer who has played for the cricket teams of Islamabad, Water and Power Development Authority, Gujranwala, Derbyshire and Lahore.

Regarded particularly for his skills in slow accumulation of runs rather than blistering pace or skill, he became Derbyshire's Player of the Year in 2004, before suffering a dip in form in 2005. His best career score, 191, came during September 2005. He now has British citizenship.

Adnan left Derbyshire at the end of September 2007. He is now an umpire, and in March 2019 stood in the match between Derbyshire and Leeds/Bradford MCCU in the opening round of Marylebone Cricket Club University Matches.
