= Michaela Kirk =

South African cricketer

Personal information
- Full name: Michaela Louise Kirk
- Born: 30 June 1999 (age 27); Johannesburg, South Africa
- Batting: Right-handed
- Bowling: Right-arm off break
- Role: All-rounder; occasional wicket-keeper

Domestic team information
- Years: Team
- 2012/13–2019/20: Northerns
- 2021–2024: Nottinghamshire
- 2021–present: The Blaze
- 2021: Trent Rockets

Career statistics
Competition	WLA	WT20
Matches	64	53
Runs scored	1,017	712
Batting average	18.16	23.73
100s/50s	0/3	0/2
Top score	58	62
Balls bowled	1,046	318
Wickets	27	11
Bowling average	22.66	22.36
5 wickets in innings	0	0
10 wickets in match	0	0
Best bowling	4/0	2/5
Catches/stumpings	28/4	22/1
- Source: CricketArchive, 19 October 2024

Michaela Louise Kirk (born 30 June 1999) is a South African cricketer who currently plays for The Blaze. She plays as a right-handed batter, right-arm off break bowler and occasional wicket-keeper. Having played for Northerns in South Africa between 2012/13 and 2019/20, in 2021 she moved to England to play cricket there, with ambitions to qualify for the national side.

== Early life ==
Kirk was born on 30 June 1999 in Johannesburg. Her grandparents are from Edinburgh, which contributed to her family's decision to move back to England in 2021.

== Domestic career ==
=== South Africa ===
Kirk made her debut for Northerns in 2012, against Easterns. In her second season with the side, 2013/14, she took 6 wickets at an average of 7.00 in the Provincial T20 Competition. In 2015/16, she was her side's second-leading run-scorer and second-leading wicket-taker, with 146 runs and 9 wickets (including a best bowling of 4/29). In the 2016/17 season, Kirk made her maiden half-century, scoring 52* against Easterns. The following season she achieved her List A best bowling figures, taking 4 wickets for 0 runs in 1.3 overs against Easterns. In 2019/20 she was her side's leading run scorer in both the Provincial League and the Provincial T20, with 140 runs and 127 runs, respectively. She has also appeared in the Women's T20 Super League for Duchesses.

=== England ===
In 2021, Kirk moved to England, moving in with her grandparents and aiming to qualify to play for the national side. For the 2021 season, she signed to play for Nottinghamshire in the Twenty20 Cup, Lightning in the regional competitions and Trent Rockets in The Hundred.

For Nottinghamshire, she helped them win the East Midlands Group of the Twenty20 Cup and scored 122 runs at an average of 61.00, including hitting 61* on debut against Northamptonshire. She made her debut for Lightning on 29 May, against Southern Vipers in the Rachael Heyhoe Flint Trophy. She went on to play four matches in the Rachael Heyhoe Flint Trophy, scoring one half-century, 57 made against Sunrisers. She also played three matches for the side in the Charlotte Edwards Cup, and three matches for Trent Rockets in The Hundred. During The Hundred in 2021, Kirk injured her anterior cruciate ligament, meaning that she missed the rest of the season, and most of the following season. In 2022, therefore, she only appeared in two matches for Lightning, both in September in the Rachael Heyhoe Flint Trophy.

In 2023, she played one match for Nottinghamshire in the Women's Twenty20 Cup, scoring 49. She played seven matches for The Blaze (the new name for Lightning) that season, with a top score of 40. In 2024, she played nine matches for The Blaze, across the Rachael Heyhoe Flint Trophy and the Charlotte Edwards Cup, with a high score of 36.
