= 2021 Rachael Heyhoe Flint Trophy =

English cricket season

- Dates: 29 May 2021 – 25 September 2021
- Administrator(s): England and Wales Cricket Board
- Cricket format: 50-over cricket
- Tournament format(s): Round-robin and playoffs
- Champions: Southern Vipers (2nd title)
- Participants: 8
- Matches: 30
- Most runs: Sophie Luff (417)
- Most wickets: Kirstie Gordon (16)
- Official website: ECB

The 2021 Rachael Heyhoe Flint Trophy was the second edition of the Rachael Heyhoe Flint Trophy, an English women's cricket 50-over domestic competition, which took place between 29 May and 25 September 2021. It featured eight teams playing in a round-robin group, followed by a knock-out round. The holders were the Southern Vipers, who won the inaugural competition in 2020. It ran alongside the Charlotte Edwards Cup. The tournament was named after former England captain Rachael Heyhoe Flint, Baroness Heyhoe-Flint, who died in 2017.

Southern Vipers finished top of the group stage, and as a result, they qualified automatically for the final. Northern Diamonds and Central Sparks finished second and third respectively, and so contested the playoff, which was won by the Diamonds to qualify for the final. In the final at the County Ground, Northampton, Southern Vipers won their second Rachael Heyhoe Flint Trophy in two years, beating Northern Diamonds by 3 wickets with 2 balls to spare.

== Background and format ==
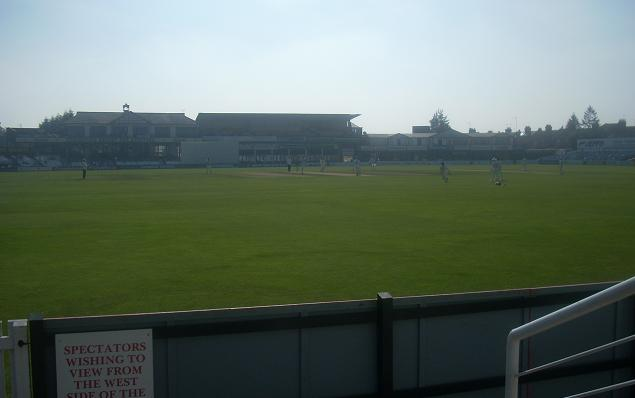
The County Cricket Ground, Northampton, pictured here in 2008, hosted the Final.

The Rachael Heyhoe Flint Trophy was a 50-over cricket tournament created in 2020 so that English women's cricket could be played in spite of the COVID-19 pandemic. A full season was scheduled for 2021, and, due to the popularity of the decision to name the trophy after Rachael Heyhoe Flint, the name was retained. The fixtures took place in two blocks, with the inaugural Charlotte Edwards Cup and The Hundred taking place in between.

The competition featured eight teams that represent regional hubs. Teams played each other once in a group of eight, with the top three qualifying for the knock-out stage. The second-placed team played the third-placed team on the 22 September, with the winner advancing to play the first-placed team in the Final on the 25 September. The Final was played at the County Cricket Ground, Northampton.

== Teams ==
The teams were as follows:

- Central Sparks (representing Warwickshire, Worcestershire, Herefordshire, Shropshire and Staffordshire)
- Lightning (representing Loughborough University, Derbyshire, Leicestershire, Nottinghamshire and Lincolnshire)
- Northern Diamonds (representing Yorkshire, Durham and Northumberland)
- North West Thunder (representing Lancashire, Cheshire and Cumbria)
- South East Stars (representing Surrey and Kent)
- Southern Vipers (representing Hampshire, Sussex, Berkshire, Buckinghamshire, Dorset, Isle of Wight and Oxfordshire)
- Sunrisers (representing Middlesex, Essex, Northamptonshire, Bedfordshire, Cambridgeshire, Hertfordshire, Huntingdonshire, Norfolk and Suffolk)
- Western Storm (representing Glamorgan, Gloucestershire, Somerset, Cornwall, Devon, Wiltshire and Cricket Wales)

== Standings ==
Teams received 4 points for a win. A bonus point was given where the winning team's run rate was 1.25 or greater times that of the opposition. In case of a tie in the standings, the following tiebreakers would be applied in order: highest net run rate, team that scored the most points in matches involving the tied parties, better bowling strike rate, drawing of lots.

Pos	Team	Pld	W	L	T	NR	BP	Pts	NRR
1	Southern Vipers (Q)	7	6	1	0	0	3	27	0.417
2	Northern Diamonds (Q)	7	5	2	0	0	3	23	1.182
3	Central Sparks (Q)	7	5	2	0	0	2	22	0.822
4	Lightning	7	3	4	0	0	1	13	0.274
5	South East Stars	7	3	4	0	0	1	13	−0.226
6	Western Storm	7	3	4	0	0	1	13	−0.462
7	North West Thunder	7	3	4	0	0	1	13	−0.620
8	Sunrisers	7	0	7	0	0	0	0	−1.598

Source: ESPNCricinfo

advanced to Final
advanced to the Play-off

== Group stage ==
29 May 2021
10:30 BST
Scorecard

Northern Diamonds; 279 (49.2 overs)	v	Central Sparks; 283/8 (48.2 overs)
Lauren Winfield-Hill 110 (126); Issy Wong 5/49 (10 overs)		Amy Jones 114 (114); Linsey Smith 3/54 (9 overs)

Central Sparks won by 2 wickets
Headingley, Leeds
Umpires: Hassan Adnan and Jasmine Naeem

- Central Sparks won the toss and elected to field.
- Points: Central Sparks 4, Northern Diamonds 0

29 May 2021
10:30 BST
Scorecard

North West Thunder; 291/8 (50 overs)	v	Western Storm; 295/9 (50 overs)
Emma Lamb 121 (105); Anya Shrubsole 3/29 (10 overs)		Heather Knight 91 (90); Kate Cross 3/35 (10 overs)

Western Storm won by 1 wicket
County Ground, Bristol
Umpires: Sarah Bartlett and Yvonne Dolphin-Cooper

- Western Storm won the toss and elected to field.
- Points: Western Storm 4, North West Thunder 0

29 May 2021
10:30 BST
Scorecard

South East Stars; 324/7 (50 overs)	v	Sunrisers; 189 (39.2 overs)
Sophia Dunkley 104* (93); Kelly Castle 3/40 (7.4 overs)		Naomi Dattani 47 (61); Tash Farrant 5/33 (8 overs)

South East Stars won by 135 runs
County Ground, Chelmsford
Umpires: Joanne Ibbotson and Sue Redfern

- Sunrisers won the toss and elected to field.
- Points: South East Stars 5, Sunrisers 0

29 May 2021
10:30 BST
Scorecard

Lightning; 214/9 (50 overs)	v	Southern Vipers; 215/6 (46.5 overs)
Tammy Beaumont 57 (91); Tara Norris 3/47 (10 overs)		Danni Wyatt 53 (57); Kirstie Gordon 4/35 (10 overs)

Southern Vipers won by 4 wickets
Rose Bowl, Southampton
Umpires: Sophie McLelland and Tom Lungley

- Lightning won the toss and elected to bat.
- Points: Southern Vipers 4, Lightning 0

31 May 2021
10:30 BST
Scorecard

Northern Diamonds; 151 (45.5 overs)	v	Lightning; 145 (48.1 overs)
Jenny Gunn 40 (77); Kathryn Bryce 4/16 (8 overs)		Tammy Beaumont 21 (34); Katherine Brunt 4/23 (10 overs)

Northern Diamonds won by 6 runs
Kibworth Cricket Club New Ground, Kibworth
Umpires: Joanne Ibbotson and Mark Newell

- Lightning won the toss and elected to field.
- Points: Northern Diamonds 4, Lightning 0

31 May 2021
10:30 BST
Scorecard

Central Sparks; 295/7 (50 overs)	v	Western Storm; 254/9 (50 overs)
Amy Jones 163* (114); Lauren Filer 2/21 (6 overs)		Lauren Parfitt 91 (122); Ria Fackrell 4/34 (9 overs)

Central Sparks won by 41 runs
Edgbaston, Birmingham
Umpires: Sue Redfern and Yvonne Dolphin-Cooper

- Western Storm won the toss and elected to field.
- Points: Central Sparks 4, Western Storm 0

31 May 2021
10:30 BST
Scorecard

South East Stars; 137 (39.5 overs)	v	Southern Vipers; 138/3 (28.4 overs)
Bryony Smith 41 (38); Charlotte Taylor 4/21 (8 overs)		Danni Wyatt 64* (88); Bryony Smith 2/25 (4 overs)

Southern Vipers won by 7 wickets
County Cricket Ground, Beckenham
Umpires: Rob White and Sarah Bartlett

- Southern Vipers won the toss and elected to field.
- Points: Southern Vipers 5, South East Stars 0

31 May 2021
10:30 BST
Scorecard

North West Thunder; 247/9 (50 overs)	v	Sunrisers; 211 (45.2 overs)
Georgie Boyce 91 (117); Sonali Patel 4/40 (7 overs)		Fran Wilson 50 (45); Sophie Ecclestone 3/28 (9.2 overs)

North West Thunder won by 36 runs
Boughton Hall Cricket Club Ground, Chester
Umpires: Jasmine Naeem and Neil Pratt

- North West Thunder won the toss and elected to bat.
- Points: North West Thunder 4, Sunrisers 0
- Sonali Patel (Sunrisers) took a hat-trick.

5 June 2021
10:30 BST
Scorecard

Western Storm; 245/8 (50 overs)	v	South East Stars; 249/4 (43.1 overs)
Heather Knight 73 (87); Tash Farrant 4/58 (10 overs)		Alice Davidson-Richards 92 (99); Nicole Harvey 2/43 (7 overs)

South East Stars won by 6 wickets
The Oval, London
Umpires: Sophie McLelland and Tom Lungley

- South East Stars won the toss and elected to field.
- Points: South East Stars 4, Western Storm 0

5 June 2021
10:30 BST
Scorecard

Sunrisers; 53 (29.1 overs)	v	Northern Diamonds; 54/1 (7.4 overs)
Amara Carr 17 (43); Jenny Gunn 3/10 (6 overs)		Hollie Armitage 14* (19); Kate Coppack 1/14 (3 overs)

Northern Diamonds won by 9 wickets
Fenner's, Cambridge
Umpires: Joanne Ibbotson and Sarah Bartlett

- Northern Diamonds won the toss and elected to field.
- Points: Northern Diamonds 5, Sunrisers 0

5 June 2021
10:30 BST
Scorecard

Central Sparks; 224 (49.2 overs)	v	Southern Vipers; 104 (27.5 overs)
Evelyn Jones 55 (103); Charlotte Taylor 3/22 (10 overs)		Danni Wyatt 61 (81); Emily Arlott 5/29 (8 overs)

Central Sparks won by 120 runs
County Ground, Hove
Umpires: Neil Pratt and Yvonne Dolphin-Cooper

- Central Sparks won the toss and elected to bat.
- Points: Central Sparks 5, Southern Vipers 0
- Emily Arlott (Central Sparks) took a hat-trick.

6 June 2021
10:30 BST
Scorecard

Lightning; 259/5 (50 overs)	v	North West Thunder; 125 (39.2 overs)
Tammy Beaumont 89 (101); Sophie Ecclestone 2/23 (10 overs)		Emma Lamb 42 (58); Kirstie Gordon 4/23 (10 overs)

Lightning won by 134 runs
Boughton Hall Cricket Club Ground, Chester
Umpires: Jasmine Naeem and Sue Redfern

- Lightning won the toss and elected to bat.
- Points: Lightning 5, North West Thunder 0

12 June 2021
10:30 BST
Scorecard

South East Stars; 250/6 (50 overs)	v	Northern Diamonds; 254/7 (49.2 overs)
Kirstie White 73 (90); Jenny Gunn 2/45 (9 overs)		Sterre Kalis 76 (106); Danielle Gregory 2/31 (10 overs)

Northern Diamonds won by 3 wickets
Headingley, Leeds
Umpires: Jasmine Naeem and Tom Lungley

- South East Stars won the toss and elected to bat.
- Points: Northern Diamonds 4, South East Stars 0

12 June 2021
10:30 BST
Scorecard

Sunrisers; 206/9 (50 overs)	v	Lightning; 210/5 (40.2 overs)
Naomi Dattani 65 (92); Teresa Graves 4/39 (10 overs)		Michaela Kirk 57 (66); Kelly Castle 2/24 (6 overs)

Lightning won by 5 wickets
Haslegrave Ground, Loughborough
Umpires: Hassan Adnan and Joanne Ibbotson

- Sunrisers won the toss and elected to bat.
- Points: Lightning 4, Sunrisers 0

12 June 2021
10:30 BST
Scorecard

Central Sparks; 203 (49.5 overs)	v	North West Thunder; 205/8 (48 overs)
Evelyn Jones 100* (150); Hannah Jones 3/33 (10 overs)		Emma Lamb 39 (47); Georgia Davis 3/42 (10 overs)

North West Thunder won by 2 wickets
New Road, Worcester
Umpires: Rob White and Yvonne Dolphin-Cooper

- Central Sparks won the toss and elected to bat.
- Points: North West Thunder 4, Central Sparks 0

12 June 2021
13:00 BST (D/N)
Scorecard

Western Storm; 177 (49.3 overs)	v	Southern Vipers; 178/2 (34.5 overs)
Katie George 37 (60); Charlie Dean 3/27 (10 overs)		Georgia Adams 77 (101); Fi Morris 1/37 (6 overs)

Southern Vipers won by 8 wickets
County Ground, Taunton
Umpires: Mark Newell and Sophie McLelland
Player of the match: Georgia Adams (Southern Vipers)

- Western Storm won the toss and elected to bat.
- Points: Southern Vipers 5, Western Storm 0

10 September 2021
10:30 BST
Scorecard

Western Storm; 183 (38.1 overs)	v	Northern Diamonds; 184/3 (31.1 overs)
Sophie Luff 65 (77); Linsey Smith 5/34 (9.1 overs)		Hollie Armitage 68* (69); Steph Hutchins 2/27 (5 overs)

Northern Diamonds won by 7 wickets
Riverside Ground, Chester-le-Street
Umpires: James Middlebrook and Lina Nenova

- Northern Diamonds won the toss and elected to field.
- Points: Northern Diamonds 5, Western Storm 0

10 September 2021
10:30 BST
Scorecard

South East Stars; 293/9 (50 overs)	v	Lightning; 265 (49.2 overs)
Bryony Smith 84 (73); Yvonne Graves 3/43 (10 overs)		Kathryn Bryce 87 (115); Bryony Smith 3/46 (10 overs)

South East Stars won by 28 runs
County Cricket Ground, Beckenham
Umpires: Neil Mallender and Sophie McLelland

- South East Stars won the toss and elected to bat.
- Points: South East Stars 4, Lightning 0

10 September 2021
10:30 BST
Scorecard

Sunrisers; 204/7 (42 overs)	v	Central Sparks; 208/4 (37.2 overs)
Cordelia Griffith 69 (95); Ria Fackrell 3/30 (6 overs)		Marie Kelly 58 (63); Kelly Castle 1/22 (9 overs)

Central Sparks won by 6 wickets (DLS)
Merchant Taylors' School, Northwood
Umpires: Jasmine Naeem and Ian Ramage

- Central Sparks won the toss and elected to field.
- Central Sparks were set a revised target of 206 runs from 42 overs due to rain.
- Points: Central Sparks 4, Sunrisers 0

10 September 2021
10:30 BST
Scorecard

North West Thunder; 110 (32.5 overs)	v	Southern Vipers; 112/7 (33.5 overs)
Kate Cross 57 (86); Tara Norris 4/14 (7.5 overs)		Ella McCaughan 41 (47); Hannah Jones 2/9 (5 overs)

Southern Vipers won by 3 wickets
Rookwood Cricket Ground, Sale
Umpires: Mike Burns and Joanne Ibbotson

- Southern Vipers won the toss and elected to field.
- Points: Southern Vipers 5, North West Thunder 0

12 September 2021
10:30 BST
Scorecard

Northern Diamonds; 294/6 (50 overs)	v	North West Thunder; 189/8 (50 overs)
Bess Heath 78* (65); Alex Hartley 2/57 (10 overs)		Georgie Boyce 67 (100); Katie Levick 4/34 (10 overs)

Northern Diamonds won by 105 runs
Riverside Ground, Chester-le-Street
Umpires: Hassan Adnan and Joanne Ibbotson

- North West Thunder won the toss and elected to field.
- Points: Northern Diamonds 5, North West Thunder 0

12 September 2021
10:30 BST
Scorecard

Central Sparks; 229 (49.1 overs)	v	South East Stars; 114 (31.3 overs)
Davina Perrin 43 (59); Ryana MacDonald-Gay 2/31 (9 overs)		Alice Capsey 26 (33); Georgia Davis 4/26 (10 overs)

Central Sparks won by 115 runs
New Road, Worcester
Umpires: James Middlebrook and Lina Nenova

- Central Sparks won the toss and elected to bat.
- Points: Central Sparks 5, South East Stars 0

12 September 2021
10:30 BST
Scorecard

Western Storm; 228/7 (50 overs)	v	Lightning; 166 (41.2 overs)
Sophie Luff 70 (111); Kirstie Gordon 3/43 (10 overs)		Ella Claridge 39* (48); Georgia Hennessy 2/22 (8 overs)

Western Storm won by 62 runs
County Ground, Bristol
Umpires: Anna Harris and Ian Ramage

- Lightning won the toss and elected to field.
- Points: Western Storm 5, Lightning 0

12 September 2021
10:30 BST
Scorecard

Southern Vipers; 309/9 (50 overs)	v	Sunrisers; 308/6 (50 overs)
Georgia Elwiss 112* (118); Sonali Patel 3/46 (10 overs)		Cordelia Griffith 91 (82); Georgia Adams 2/36 (6 overs)

Southern Vipers won by 1 run
County Ground, Chelmsford
Umpires: Sarah Bartlett and Sophie McLelland
Player of the match: Georgia Elwiss (Southern Vipers)

- Sunrisers won the toss and elected to field.
- Points: Southern Vipers 4, Sunrisers 0

18 September 2021
10:30 BST
Scorecard

Lightning; 320/6 (50 overs)	v	Central Sparks; 296/9 (50 overs)
Kathryn Bryce 162 (156); Issy Wong 3/61 (10 overs)		Marie Kelly 62 (69); Sonia Odedra 2/56 (9 overs)

Lightning won by 24 runs
Haslegrave Ground, Loughborough
Umpires: Jasmine Naeem and Neil Pratt

- Central Sparks won the toss and elected to field.
- Points: Lightning 4, Central Sparks 0

18 September 2021
10:30 BST
Scorecard

North West Thunder; 185 (47 overs)	v	South East Stars; 130 (35 overs)
Eleanor Threlkeld 70* (92); Danielle Gregory 2/23 (10 overs)		Kalea Moore 35 (59); Hannah Jones 5/33 (9 overs)

North West Thunder won by 55 runs
County Cricket Ground, Beckenham
Umpires: Sarah Bartlett and Mark Newell

- North West Thunder won the toss and elected to bat.
- Points: North West Thunder 5, South East Stars 0

18 September 2021
10:30 BST
Scorecard

Western Storm; 313/4 (50 overs)	v	Sunrisers; 277 (44.3 overs)
Sophie Luff 157* (142); Mady Villiers 2/39 (10 overs)		Cordelia Griffith 49 (42); Georgia Hennessy 2/45 (8 overs)

Western Storm won by 36 runs
County Ground, Bristol
Umpires: Yvonne Dolphin-Cooper and Tom Lungley

- Western Storm won the toss and elected to bat.
- Points: Western Storm 4, Sunrisers 0

18 September 2021
10:30 BST
Scorecard

Northern Diamonds; 256 (48.3 overs)	v	Southern Vipers; 260/5 (48.5 overs)
Bess Heath 71 (51); Lauren Bell 2/29 (10 overs)		Georgia Elwiss 84* (77); Phoebe Graham 3/44 (10 overs)

Southern Vipers won by 5 wickets
Rose Bowl, Southampton
Umpires: Sophie McLelland and Ian Ramage

- Northern Diamonds won the toss and elected to bat.
- Points: Southern Vipers 4, Northern Diamonds 0

== Play-off ==
Northern Diamonds and Central Sparks finished second and third respectively in the group stage, and so contested the playoff.

Play-off			Final
			1	Southern Vipers	187/7
2	Northern Diamonds	176/4	2	Northern Diamonds	183
3	Central Sparks	175/7

22 September 2021
10:30 BST
Scorecard

Central Sparks; 175/7 (50 overs)	v	Northern Diamonds; 176/4 (32.5 overs)
Ria Fackrell 42* (80); Linsey Smith 2/25 (10 overs)		Ami Campbell 76 (78); Emily Arlott 2/35 (9 overs)

Northern Diamonds won by 6 wickets
North Marine Road Ground, Scarborough
Umpires: Sarah Bartlett and Rob White

- Central Sparks won the toss and elected to bat.

== Final ==
Southern Vipers finished top of the group stage, and as a result, they qualified automatically for the final.

25 September 2021
10:30 BST
Scorecard

Northern Diamonds; 183 (49.2 overs)	v	Southern Vipers; 187/7 (49.4 overs)
Ami Campbell 60 (73); Georgia Adams 4/35 (10 overs)		Emily Windsor 47* (97); Jenny Gunn 3/31 (10 overs)

Southern Vipers won by 3 wickets
County Ground, Northampton
Umpires: Jasmine Naeem and Neil Pratt
Player of the match: Emily Windsor (Southern Vipers)

- Northern Diamonds won the toss and elected to bat.

== Statistics ==
- Highest score by a team: South East Stars – 324/7 (50 overs) v Sunrisers (29 May).
- Top score by an individual: Amy Jones – 163* (114) v Western Storm (31 May).
- Best bowling figures by an individual: Emily Arlott – 5/29 (8 overs) v Southern Vipers (5 June).

=== Most runs ===
Player	Team	Matches	Innings	Runs	Average	HS	100s	50s
Sophie Luff	Western Storm	7	7	417	69.50	157*	1	3
Kathryn Bryce	Lightning	7	7	353	50.42	162	1	2
Evelyn Jones	Central Sparks	8	8	299	42.71	100*	1	2
Sterre Kalis	Northern Diamonds	9	8	290	41.42	76	0	2
Amy Jones	Central Sparks	3	3	282	141.00	163*	2	0

Source: ESPNCricinfo

=== Most wickets ===
Player	Team	Overs	Wickets	Average	BBI	5w
Kirstie Gordon	Lightning	70.0	16	15.43	4/23	0
Hannah Jones	North West Thunder	50.0	14	17.07	5/33	1
Issy Wong	Central Sparks	63.5	14	21.35	5/49	1
Charlotte Taylor	Southern Vipers	72.0	13	18.15	4/21	0
Beth Langston	Northern Diamonds	73.5	13	20.69	2/12	0

Source: ESPNCricinfo
