= Marie Kelly =

English cricketer (born 1996)

Personal information
- Full name: Marie Kelly
- Born: 9 February 1996 (age 30); Birmingham, England
- Batting: Right-handed
- Bowling: Right-arm off break
- Role: Batter

Domestic team information
- Years: Team
- 2011–2024: Warwickshire
- 2017: Loughborough Lightning
- 2019: Southern Vipers
- 2020–2021: Central Sparks
- 2021: Birmingham Phoenix
- 2022–present: The Blaze
- 2022: Trent Rockets
- 2023–present: Northern Superchargers
- 2023: Trinbago Knight Riders

Career statistics
Competition	WLA	WT20
Matches	102	118
Runs scored	1,923	2,005
Batting average	21.36	22.27
100s/50s	0/12	1/9
Top score	64	100*
Balls bowled	1,140	597
Wickets	33	35
Bowling average	23.45	16.11
5 wickets in innings	0	0
10 wickets in match	0	0
Best bowling	4/13	4/30
Catches/stumpings	41/–	56/–
- Source: CricketArchive, 19 October 2024

Marie Kelly (born 9 February 1996) is an English cricketer who plays for The Blaze and Northern Superchargers. She plays primarily as a right-handed batter. She led Warwickshire to the 2019 Women's Twenty20 Cup title, and was the leading run-scorer in Division 1 that year. She has previously played for Warwickshire, Southern Vipers, Central Sparks, Birmingham Phoenix, Trent Rockets and Trinbago Knight Riders.

== Early life ==
Kelly was born on 9 February 1996 in Birmingham, West Midlands. She has a degree in Sports Science from Loughborough University. Her twin sister, Sian, played for Warwickshire between 2011 and 2017.

== Domestic career ==
Kelly made her county debut in 2011, for Warwickshire against Cheshire. She scored 12 runs and bowled 2 overs for no wicket. In 2012, in two innings over one weekend playing for Warwickshire Under-17s, Kelly scored 201* and 110* and soon after became a regular in Warwickshire's first team. She hit her maiden T20 half-century in 2013, against the Netherlands.

Kelly began captaining Warwickshire in 2015, standing-in for Rebecca Grundy. She became permanent captain of the side in 2016. In 2019, Kelly led her side to victory in the Twenty20 Cup. Warwickshire topped Division 1 by one point after beating runners-up Lancashire in the final match, with Kelly top-scoring with 76. She also ended the season as the leading run-scorer in Division 1. Kelly was Warwickshire's leading run-scorer in the 2021 Women's Twenty20 Cup, with 162 runs at an average of 81.00. She was again Warwickshire's leading run-scorer in the 2022 Women's Twenty20 Cup, with 192 runs at an average of 32.00. She scored two half-centuries on the same day in a double-header against Gloucestershire, 99 from 61 deliveries in the first match and 60 from 27 deliveries in the second. In the second match, her half-century came from 15 deliveries, which is the fastest recorded fifty in Women's Twenty20 cricket. She played two matches for Warwickshire in the 2023 Women's Twenty20 Cup, scoring 75 runs and taking two wickets.

Kelly also played in the Women's Cricket Super League, for Loughborough Lightning in 2017 and Southern Vipers in 2019. She played one match for Loughborough, in which she scored 18 runs against Western Storm. She played five matches for the Vipers, scoring 13 runs at an average of 4.33. In 2020, Kelly was announced as part of the Central Sparks squad for the Rachael Heyhoe Flint Trophy. She was the side's second-highest run-scorer, with 223 runs at an average of 55.75, and scored two half-centuries. In December 2020, it was announced that Kelly was one of the 41 female cricketers that had signed a full-time domestic contract.

In 2021, Kelly scored 182 runs for Central Sparks in the Rachael Heyhoe Flint Trophy, including two half-centuries. In a Charlotte Edwards Cup match against Southern Vipers, Kelly hit 100* from 53 balls, her Twenty20 high score and first ever century, to help her side to a 6 wicket victory. She also signed to play for Birmingham Phoenix in The Hundred, but only made one appearance in the competition. At the end of the season it was announced that Kelly had moved to Lightning, and signed a professional contract with her new side. She played eleven matches for Lightning in 2022, across the Charlotte Edwards Cup and the Rachael Heyhoe Flint Trophy, scoring 197 runs and taking six wickets. She also played seven matches for Trent Rockets in The Hundred, scoring 40 runs.

In 2023, she played 20 matches for The Blaze (the new name for Lightning), across the Rachael Heyhoe Flint Trophy and the Charlotte Edwards Cup, scoring one half-century and taking three wickets. She moved to Northern Superchargers for The Hundred, scoring 176 runs including one half-century. She also played for Trinbago Knight Riders in the 2023 Women's Caribbean Premier League, scoring 57 runs and taking six wickets. In 2024, she played 26 matches for The Blaze, across the Rachael Heyhoe Flint Trophy and the Charlotte Edwards Cup, scoring two half-centuries.

In 2025 Kelly played for the Birmingham Phoenix in The Hundred Competition. In 2026 Kelly was picked up by London Spirit in the auction.

Kelly has also been a part of the Emerging Players Programme, the England Women's Academy and played for the England Under-19s.
