= 2022 South East Stars season =

English cricket season

South East Stars
2022 season
- Coach: Johann Myburgh
- Captain: Bryony Smith
- Overseas player: (Australia) Lauren Smith
- RHFT: 3rd
- CEC: 3rd
- Most runs: RHFT: Bryony Smith (226); CEC: Aylish Cranstone (235)
- Most wickets: RHFT: Alice Davidson-Richards (9) & Eva Gray (9); CEC: Bryony Smith (11)
- Most catches: RHFT: Kirstie White (4); CEC: 6 players (3)
- Most wicket-keeping dismissals: RHFT: Kira Chathli (6); CEC: Kira Chathli (3)

The 2022 season was South East Stars' third season, in which they competed in the 50 over Rachael Heyhoe Flint Trophy and the Twenty20 Charlotte Edwards Cup. In the Charlotte Edwards Cup, the side finished top of Group A, winning five of their six matches and progressing to the semi-final. In the semi-final, they lost to Central Sparks by 2 wickets. In the Rachael Heyhoe Flint Trophy, the side finished second in the group, winning five of their seven matches and progressing to the play-off. In the play-off, they lost to Southern Vipers by 6 wickets.

The side was captained by Bryony Smith, who replaced Tash Farrant in the position at the start of the season, and coached by Johann Myburgh. They played five home matches at the County Ground, Beckenham and two at Woodbridge Road, Guildford.

== Squad ==
=== Changes ===
On 29 October 2021, it was announced that Alice Capsey and Danielle Gregory had been awarded professional contracts with the side, having previously been on temporary contracts. On 1 November 2021, Susie Rowe retired from all forms of cricket. On 18 March 2022, it was announced that Hannah Jones was taking an indefinite break from cricket. South East Stars announced their 20-player squad for the season on 9 May 2022, with the addition of Claudie Cooper being the only change from the 2021 squad. On the same day, it was announced that Bryony Smith would be taking over the captaincy of the side from Tash Farrant. On 16 July 2022, Academy players Sydney Gorham, Bethan Miles and Megan Sturge, and overseas player Lauren Smith were all named in a matchday squad for the first time. On 8 September 2022, Academy players Madeleine Blinkhorn-Jones and Jemima Spence were named in a matchday squad for the first time.

=== Squad list ===
- Age given is at the start of South East Stars' first match of the season (14 May 2022).

| Name | Nationality | Birth date | Batting Style | Bowling Style | Notes |
Batters
| Madeleine Blinkhorn-Jones | England | 20 April 2003 (aged 19) | Right-handed | — | Joined September 2022 |
| Chloe Brewer | England | 12 July 2002 (aged 19) | Right-handed | Right-arm medium | |
| Aylish Cranstone | England | 28 August 1994 (aged 27) | Left-handed | Left-arm medium | |
| Megan Sturge | England | 3 November 2004 (aged 17) | Right-handed | Right-arm off break | Joined July 2022 |
| Kirstie White | England | 14 March 1988 (aged 34) | Right-handed | Right-arm medium | |
All-rounders
| Alice Capsey | England | 11 August 2004 (aged 17) | Right-handed | Right-arm off break | |
| Alice Davidson-Richards | England | 29 May 1994 (aged 27) | Right-handed | Right-arm fast-medium | |
| Sophia Dunkley | England | 16 July 1998 (aged 23) | Right-handed | Right-arm leg break | |
| Phoebe Franklin | England | 18 February 1998 (aged 24) | Right-handed | Right-arm medium | |
| Grace Gibbs | England | 1 May 1995 (aged 27) | Right-handed | Right-arm medium | |
| Emma Jones | England | 8 August 2002 (aged 19) | Right-handed | Right-arm medium | |
| Ryana MacDonald-Gay | England | 12 February 2004 (aged 18) | Right-handed | Right-arm medium | |
| Kalea Moore | England | 27 March 2003 (aged 19) | Right-handed | Right-arm off break | |
| Bryony Smith | England | 12 December 1997 (aged 24) | Right-handed | Right-arm off break | Captain |
Wicket-keepers
| Kira Chathli | England | 29 July 1999 (aged 22) | Right-handed | — | |
| Rhianna Southby | England | 16 October 2000 (aged 21) | Right-handed | — | |
| Jemima Spence | England | 6 July 2006 (aged 15) | Right-handed | — | Joined September 2022 |
Bowlers
| Claudie Cooper | England | 1 May 2002 (aged 20) | Right-handed | Right-arm off break | |
| Freya Davies | England | 27 October 1995 (aged 26) | Right-handed | Right-arm fast-medium | |
| Tash Farrant | England | 29 May 1996 (aged 25) | Left-handed | Left-arm medium | |
| Sydney Gorham | England | 19 October 2003 (aged 18) | Right-handed | Right-arm medium | Joined July 2022 |
| Eva Gray | England | 24 May 2000 (aged 21) | Right-handed | Right-arm medium | |
| Danielle Gregory | England | 4 December 1998 (aged 23) | Right-handed | Right-arm leg break | |
| Bethan Miles | England | 25 November 2003 (aged 18) | Right-handed | Slow left-arm orthodox | Joined July 2022 |
| Lauren Smith | Australia | 6 October 1996 (aged 25) | Right-handed | Right-arm off break | Overseas player; joined July 2022 |
| Alexa Stonehouse | England | 5 December 2004 (aged 17) | Right-handed | Left-arm medium | |

== Charlotte Edwards Cup ==
=== Group A ===
| Pos | Team | Pld | W | L | T | NR | BP | Pts | NRR |
|---|---|---|---|---|---|---|---|---|---|
| 1 | South East Stars (Q) | 6 | 5 | 1 | 0 | 0 | 1 | 21 | 0.660 |
| 2 | Central Sparks (Q) | 6 | 4 | 2 | 0 | 0 | 1 | 17 | 0.552 |
| 3 | Western Storm | 6 | 3 | 3 | 0 | 0 | 1 | 13 | 0.148 |
| 4 | Sunrisers | 6 | 0 | 6 | 0 | 0 | 0 | 0 | −1.287 |

Source: England and Wales Cricket Board
- advanced to the semi-final

=== Fixtures ===
14 May 2022
14:30 BST
Scorecard

| Sunrisers; 122/6 (20 overs) | v | South East Stars; 123/4 (16.5 overs) |
| Cordelia Griffith 26 (28); Emma Jones 1/2 (1 over) | | Aylish Cranstone 56* (46); Jo Gardner 1/15 (3 overs) |

South East Stars won by 6 wickets
County Ground, Chelmsford
Umpires: Neil Pratt and Sarah Bartlett

- South East Stars won the toss and elected to field.
- Points: South East Stars 4, Sunrisers 0

18 May 2022
16:00 BST
Scorecard

| Central Sparks; 170/6 (20 overs) | v | South East Stars; 136 (20 overs) |
| Issy Wong 45 (28); Alice Davidson-Richards 2/27 (4 overs) | | Bryony Smith 41 (31); Grace Potts 4/36 (4 overs) |

Central Sparks won by 34 runs
Woodbridge Road, Guildford
Umpires: Paul Baldwin and Sophie McLelland

- South East Stars won the toss and elected to field.
- Points: Central Sparks 5, South East Stars 0

21 May 2022
11:00 BST
Scorecard

| Western Storm; 145/6 (20 overs) | v | South East Stars; 148/3 (19 overs) |
| Georgia Hennessy 50 (52); Bryony Smith 2/22 (3 overs) | | Aylish Cranstone 66* (49); Claire Nicholas 2/17 (4 overs) |

South East Stars won by 7 wickets
County Ground, Beckenham
Umpires: Ben Debenham and Sarah Bartlett

- South East Stars won the toss and elected to field.
- Points: South East Stars 4, Western Storm 0

29 May 2022
18:15 BST (D/N)
Scorecard

| South East Stars; 148/6 (20 overs) | v | Central Sparks; 91/7 (12 overs) |
| Aylish Cranstone 59* (53); Sarah Glenn 3/17 (4 overs) | | Evelyn Jones 25 (23); Danielle Gregory 2/6 (2 overs) |

South East Stars won by 10 runs (DLS)
Edgbaston Cricket Ground, Birmingham
Umpires: Ian Blackwell and Jane Pratt

- South East Stars won the toss and elected to bat.
- Central Sparks' target revised to 102 from 12 overs due to rain.
- Points: South East Stars 4, Central Sparks 0

1 June 2022
14:30 BST
Scorecard

| Western Storm; 109/8 (20 overs) | v | South East Stars; 112/7 (19.3 overs) |
| Fran Wilson 33* (30); Kalea Moore 3/4 (2 overs) | | Alice Davidson-Richards 35 (25); Sophia Smale 2/18 (4 overs) |

South East Stars won by 3 wickets
County Ground, Bristol
Umpires: Anna Harris and Sarah Bartlett

- South East Stars won the toss and elected to field.
- Points: South East Stars 4, Western Storm 0

5 June 2022
14:30 BST
Scorecard

| South East Stars; 183/9 (20 overs) | v | Sunrisers; 127 (17 overs) |
| Bryony Smith 50 (31); Kelly Castle 2/14 (4 overs) | | Amara Carr 31 (27); Kalea Moore 2/16 (3 overs) |

South East Stars won by 56 runs
Woodbridge Road, Guildford
Umpires: Anna Harris and Sue Redfern

- South East Stars won the toss and elected to bat.
- Points: South East Stars 5, Sunrisers 0

==== Semi-final ====
11 June 2022
12:00 BST
Scorecard

| South East Stars; 104/8 (20 overs) | v | Central Sparks; 105/8 (19.1 overs) |
| Kalea Moore 34 (42); Grace Potts 3/20 (4 overs) | | Evelyn Jones 29 (24); Bryony Smith 4/14 (4 overs) |

Central Sparks won by 2 wickets
County Ground, Northampton
Umpires: Sarah Bartlett and Sophie McLelland
Player of the match: Issy Wong (Central Sparks)

- South East Stars won the toss and elected to bat.

=== Tournament statistics ===
==== Batting ====
| Player | Matches | Innings | Runs | Average | High score | 100s | 50s |
|---|---|---|---|---|---|---|---|
| Aylish Cranstone | 7 | 7 | 235 | 58.75 | 66* | 0 | 3 |
| Bryony Smith | 7 | 7 | 149 | 21.28 | 50 | 0 | 1 |
| Kalea Moore | 7 | 6 | 133 | 44.33 | 57* | 0 | 1 |
| Alice Davidson-Richards | 7 | 6 | 97 | 16.16 | 35 | 0 | 0 |
| Kira Chathli | 7 | 6 | 69 | 17.25 | 26* | 0 | 0 |
| Phoebe Franklin | 5 | 5 | 53 | 10.60 | 22 | 0 | 0 |
| Emma Jones | 6 | 5 | 52 | 13.00 | 33 | 0 | 0 |

Source: ESPN Cricinfo Qualification: 50 runs.

==== Bowling ====
| Player | Matches | Overs | Wickets | Average | Economy | BBI | 5wi |
|---|---|---|---|---|---|---|---|
| Bryony Smith | 7 | 23.0 | 11 | 13.27 | 6.34 | 4/14 | 0 |
| Kalea Moore | 7 | 14.0 | 8 | 8.50 | 4.85 | 3/4 | 0 |
| Alice Davidson-Richards | 7 | 17.1 | 6 | 20.83 | 7.28 | 2/27 | 0 |

Source: ESPN Cricinfo Qualification: 5 wickets.

== Rachael Heyhoe Flint Trophy ==
=== Season standings ===
| Pos | Team | Pld | W | L | T | NR | BP | Pts | NRR |
|---|---|---|---|---|---|---|---|---|---|
| 1 | Northern Diamonds (Q) | 7 | 6 | 0 | 0 | 1 | 2 | 28 | 0.851 |
| 2 | South East Stars (Q) | 7 | 5 | 1 | 0 | 1 | 4 | 26 | 0.687 |
| 3 | Southern Vipers (Q) | 7 | 5 | 1 | 0 | 1 | 2 | 24 | 0.762 |
| 4 | Western Storm | 7 | 3 | 3 | 0 | 1 | 1 | 15 | −0.214 |
| 5 | Central Sparks | 7 | 2 | 4 | 0 | 1 | 1 | 11 | 0.073 |
| 6 | Lightning | 7 | 2 | 4 | 0 | 1 | 1 | 11 | −0.630 |
| 7 | North West Thunder | 7 | 1 | 5 | 0 | 1 | 0 | 6 | −0.366 |
| 8 | Sunrisers | 7 | 0 | 6 | 0 | 1 | 0 | 2 | −1.046 |

Source: England and Wales Cricket Board

advanced to final advanced to the play-off

=== Fixtures ===
2 July 2022
10:30 BST
Scorecard

| South East Stars; 281/8 (50 overs) | v | Sunrisers; 201 (41.4 overs) |
| Bryony Smith 66 (68); Grace Scrivens 4/42 (10 overs) | | Grace Scrivens 74 (74); Bryony Smith 3/37 (10 overs) |

South East Stars won by 80 runs
County Ground, Beckenham
Umpires: Grace Bambury and Mark Newell

- South East Stars won the toss and elected to bat.
- Points: South East Stars 5, Sunrisers 0

9 July 2022
10:30 BST
Scorecard

| Southern Vipers; 306/9 (50 overs) | v | South East Stars; 173 (38.4 overs) |
| Georgia Elwiss 115 (115); Freya Davies 3/37 (9 overs) | | Alice Davidson-Richards 42 (47); Paige Scholfield 3/29 (5.4 overs) |

Southern Vipers won by 133 runs
County Ground, Hove
Umpires: Anthony Harris and Sarah Bartlett

- South East Stars won the toss and elected to field.
- Points: Southern Vipers 5, South East Stars 0

16 July 2022
10:30 BST
Scorecard

| South East Stars; 198 (47.5 overs) | v | North West Thunder; 146 (40.1 overs) |
| Lauren Smith 73* (93); Alex Hartley 6/24 (10 overs) | | Georgie Boyce 68 (105); Bethan Miles 3/15 (6 overs) |

South East Stars won by 52 runs
Trafalgar Road Ground, Southport
Umpires: Grace Bambury and Naeem Ashraf

- South East Stars won the toss and elected to bat.
- Points: South East Stars 5, North West Thunder 0

23 July 2022
10:30 BST
Scorecard

| South East Stars; 283/8 (50 overs) | v | Western Storm; 247 (48 overs) |
| Chloe Brewer 61 (53); Chloe Skelton 5/54 (9 overs) | | Sophie Luff 95 (119); Alice Davidson-Richards 4/33 (8 overs) |

South East Stars won by 36 runs
College Ground, Cheltenham
Umpires: Anthony Harris and Jasmine Naeem

- South East Stars won the toss and elected to bat.
- Points: South East Stars 4, Western Storm 0

9 September 2022
10:30 BST

| South East Stars | v | Northern Diamonds |

No Result
County Ground, Beckenham

- The match was postponed due to the death of Queen Elizabeth II, and later deemed a no result with points shared.
- Points: South East Stars 2, Northern Diamonds 2

11 September 2022
10:30 BST
Scorecard

| South East Stars; 254/9 (50 overs) | v | Central Sparks; 195/9 (50 overs) |
| Chloe Brewer 57 (76); Elizabeth Russell 3/44 (10 overs) | | Georgia Davis 52* (103); Eva Gray 3/28 (8 overs) |

South East Stars won by 59 runs
County Ground, Beckenham
Umpires: Joanne Ibbotson and Russell Warren

- Central Sparks won the toss and elected to field.
- Points: South East Stars 5, Central Sparks 0

17 September 2022
10:30 BST
Scorecard

| South East Stars; 281/9 (50 overs) | v | Lightning; 169 (38.4 overs) |
| Bryony Smith 114 (102); Grace Ballinger 3/62 (10 overs) | | Georgie Boyce 70 (83); Eva Gray 3/29 (6 overs) |

South East Stars won by 112 runs
Grace Road, Leicester
Umpires: Hassan Adnan and Rose Dovey

- South East Stars won the toss and elected to bat.
- Points: South East Stars 5, Lightning 0

==== Play-off ====
21 September 2022
10:30 BST
Scorecard

| South East Stars; 139 (42.2 overs) | v | Southern Vipers; 143/4 (34 overs) |
| Jemima Spence 45* (102); Tara Norris 3/29 (10 overs) | | Maia Bouchier 51 (68); Phoebe Franklin 1/14 (5 overs) |

Southern Vipers won by 6 wickets
County Ground, Beckenham
Umpires: Jack Shantry and Jasmine Naeem

- South East Stars won the toss and elected to bat.

=== Tournament statistics ===
==== Batting ====
| Player | Matches | Innings | Runs | Average | High score | 100s | 50s |
|---|---|---|---|---|---|---|---|
| Bryony Smith | 4 | 4 | 226 | 56.50 | 114 | 1 | 1 |
| Chloe Brewer | 5 | 5 | 172 | 34.40 | 61 | 0 | 2 |
| Alice Davidson-Richards | 3 | 3 | 142 | 47.33 | 50 | 0 | 2 |
| Kira Chathli | 7 | 7 | 124 | 17.71 | 61 | 0 | 1 |
| Ryana MacDonald-Gay | 4 | 4 | 112 | 112.00 | 54* | 0 | 1 |

Source: ESPN Cricinfo Qualification: 100 runs.

==== Bowling ====
| Player | Matches | Overs | Wickets | Average | Economy | BBI | 5wi |
|---|---|---|---|---|---|---|---|
| Alice Davidson-Richards | 3 | 28.0 | 9 | 18.22 | 5.85 | 4/33 | 0 |
| Eva Gray | 7 | 45.4 | 9 | 21.55 | 4.24 | 3/28 | 0 |
| Phoebe Franklin | 6 | 37.0 | 8 | 21.25 | 4.59 | 2/25 | 0 |
| Alexa Stonehouse | 7 | 38.0 | 6 | 26.83 | 4.23 | 3/27 | 0 |
| Bryony Smith | 4 | 30.0 | 5 | 27.00 | 4.50 | 3/37 | 0 |
| Danielle Gregory | 7 | 50.4 | 5 | 46.80 | 4.61 | 2/36 | 0 |

Source: ESPN Cricinfo Qualification: 5 wickets.

== Season statistics ==
=== Batting ===
| Player | Rachael Heyhoe Flint Trophy | | | | | | | | Charlotte Edwards Cup | | | | | | | |
| Player | Matches | Innings | Runs | High score | Average | Strike rate | 100s | 50s | Matches | Innings | Runs | High score | Average | Strike rate | 100s | 50s |
|---|---|---|---|---|---|---|---|---|---|---|---|---|---|---|---|---|
| Madeleine Blinkhorn-Jones | 1 | 1 | 0 | 0 | 0.00 | 0.00 | 0 | 0 | – | – | – | – | – | – | – | – |
| Chloe Brewer | 5 | 5 | 172 | 61 | 34.40 | 85.57 | 0 | 2 | – | – | – | – | – | – | – | – |
| Alice Capsey | 2 | 2 | 70 | 64* | 70.00 | 79.54 | 0 | 0 | 7 | 7 | 47 | 19 | 6.71 | 114.63 | 0 | 0 |
| Aylish Cranstone | 3 | 3 | 43 | 27 | 14.33 | 82.69 | 0 | 0 | 7 | 7 | 235 | 66* | 58.75 | 115.76 | 0 | 3 |
| Alice Davidson-Richards | 3 | 3 | 142 | 50 | 47.33 | 80.22 | 0 | 2 | 7 | 6 | 69 | 26* | 16.16 | 100.00 | 0 | 0 |
| Freya Davies | 3 | 3 | 13 | 8* | 6.50 | 41.93 | 0 | 0 | 6 | 2 | 7 | 7 | 7.00 | 140.00 | 0 | 0 |
| Sophia Dunkley | – | – | – | – | – | – | – | – | 2 | 2 | 13 | 8 | 6.50 | 100.00 | 0 | 0 |
| Tash Farrant | – | – | – | – | – | – | – | – | 1 | 1 | 4 | 4 | 4.00 | 40.00 | 0 | 0 |
| Phoebe Franklin | 6 | 6 | 94 | 37 | 15.66 | 68.11 | 0 | 0 | 5 | 5 | 53 | 22 | 10.60 | 94.64 | 0 | 0 |
| Grace Gibbs | 2 | 2 | 15 | 13 | 7.50 | 50.00 | 0 | 0 | – | – | – | – | – | – | – | – |
| Eva Gray | 7 | 7 | 50 | 18* | 10.00 | 76.92 | 0 | 0 | – | – | – | – | – | – | – | – |
| Danielle Gregory | 7 | 5 | 35 | 16 | 11.66 | 45.45 | 0 | 0 | 6 | 1 | 0 | 0 | 0.00 | 0.00 | 0 | 0 |
| Emma Jones | – | – | – | – | – | – | – | – | 6 | 5 | 52 | 33 | 13.00 | 120.93 | 0 | 0 |
| Ryana MacDonald-Gay | 4 | 4 | 112 | 54* | 112.00 | 96.55 | 0 | 1 | 1 | 1 | 1 | 1* | – | 50.00 | 0 | 0 |
| Bethan Miles | 1 | 1 | 0 | 0 | 0.00 | 0.00 | 0 | 0 | – | – | – | – | – | – | – | – |
| Kalea Moore | – | – | – | – | – | – | – | – | 7 | 6 | 133 | 57* | 44.33 | 100.00 | 0 | 1 |
| Bryony Smith | 4 | 4 | 226 | 114 | 56.50 | 106.60 | 1 | 1 | 7 | 7 | 149 | 50 | 21.28 | 120.16 | 0 | 1 |
| Lauren Smith | 2 | 2 | 93 | 73* | 93.00 | 78.81 | 0 | 1 | – | – | – | – | – | – | – | – |
| Rhianna Southby | 5 | 5 | 85 | 54 | 17.00 | 83.33 | 0 | 1 | – | – | – | – | – | – | – | – |
| Jemima Spence | 3 | 3 | 88 | 45* | 44.00 | 48.61 | 0 | 0 | – | – | – | – | – | – | – | – |
| Alexa Stonehouse | 7 | 7 | 82 | 31 | 11.71 | 62.12 | 0 | 0 | 6 | 3 | 9 | 7* | 9.00 | 69.23 | 0 | 0 |
| Kirstie White | 5 | 5 | 32 | 12 | 6.40 | 43.83 | 0 | 0 | 2 | 1 | 15 | 15 | 15.00 | 150.00 | 0 | 0 |
Source: ESPN Cricinfo

=== Bowling ===
| Player | Rachael Heyhoe Flint Trophy | | | | | | | Charlotte Edwards Cup | | | | | | |
| Player | Matches | Overs | Wickets | Average | Economy | BBI | 5wi | Matches | Overs | Wickets | Average | Economy | BBI | 5wi |
|---|---|---|---|---|---|---|---|---|---|---|---|---|---|---|
| Alice Capsey | 2 | 5.0 | 2 | 20.50 | 8.20 | 2/26 | 0 | 7 | 16.0 | 3 | 36.66 | 6.87 | 1/10 | 0 |
| Alice Davidson-Richards | 3 | 28.0 | 9 | 18.22 | 5.85 | 4/33 | 0 | 7 | 17.1 | 6 | 20.83 | 7.28 | 2/27 | 0 |
| Freya Davies | 3 | 23.0 | 4 | 21.25 | 3.69 | 3/37 | 0 | 6 | 17.0 | 2 | 49.50 | 5.82 | 2/16 | 0 |
| Tash Farrant | – | – | – | – | – | – | – | 1 | 2.0 | 0 | – | 12.00 | – | 0 |
| Phoebe Franklin | 6 | 37.0 | 8 | 21.25 | 4.59 | 2/25 | 0 | 5 | 4.0 | 1 | 30.00 | 7.50 | 1/16 | 0 |
| Grace Gibbs | 2 | 6.0 | 1 | 26.00 | 4.33 | 1/9 | 0 | – | – | – | – | – | – | – |
| Eva Gray | 7 | 45.4 | 9 | 21.55 | 4.24 | 3/28 | 0 | – | – | – | – | – | – | – |
| Danielle Gregory | 7 | 50.4 | 5 | 46.80 | 4.61 | 2/36 | 0 | 6 | 17.0 | 4 | 27.00 | 6.35 | 2/6 | 0 |
| Emma Jones | – | – | – | – | – | – | – | 6 | 8.0 | 2 | 35.00 | 8.75 | 1/2 | 0 |
| Ryana MacDonald-Gay | 4 | 22.0 | 4 | 25.25 | 4.59 | 2/29 | 0 | 1 | 3.0 | 2 | 9.50 | 6.33 | 2/19 | 0 |
| Bethan Miles | 1 | 6.0 | 3 | 5.00 | 2.50 | 3/15 | 0 | – | – | – | – | – | – | – |
| Kalea Moore | – | – | – | – | – | – | – | 7 | 14.0 | 8 | 8.50 | 4.85 | 3/4 | 0 |
| Bryony Smith | 4 | 30.0 | 5 | 27.00 | 4.50 | 3/37 | 0 | 7 | 23.0 | 11 | 13.27 | 6.34 | 4/14 | 0 |
| Lauren Smith | 2 | 11.1 | 2 | 23.00 | 4.11 | 2/20 | 0 | – | – | – | – | – | – | – |
| Alexa Stonehouse | 7 | 38.0 | 6 | 26.83 | 4.23 | 3/27 | 0 | 6 | 7.0 | 1 | 55.00 | 7.85 | 1/21 | 0 |
Source: ESPN Cricinfo

=== Fielding ===
| Player | Rachael Heyhoe Flint Trophy | | | Charlotte Edwards Cup | | |
| Player | Matches | Innings | Catches | Matches | Innings | Catches |
|---|---|---|---|---|---|---|
| Madeleine Blinkhorn-Jones | 1 | 1 | 0 | – | – | – |
| Chloe Brewer | 5 | 5 | 2 | – | – | – |
| Alice Capsey | 2 | 2 | 1 | 7 | 7 | 2 |
| Aylish Cranstone | 3 | 3 | 0 | 7 | 7 | 3 |
| Alice Davidson-Richards | 3 | 3 | 1 | 7 | 7 | 3 |
| Freya Davies | 3 | 3 | 1 | 6 | 6 | 3 |
| Sophia Dunkley | – | – | – | 2 | 2 | 0 |
| Tash Farrant | – | – | – | 1 | 1 | 0 |
| Phoebe Franklin | 6 | 6 | 3 | 5 | 5 | 3 |
| Grace Gibbs | 2 | 2 | 3 | – | – | – |
| Eva Gray | 7 | 7 | 0 | – | – | – |
| Danielle Gregory | 7 | 7 | 1 | 6 | 6 | 0 |
| Emma Jones | – | – | – | 6 | 6 | 3 |
| Ryana MacDonald-Gay | 4 | 4 | 1 | 1 | 1 | 1 |
| Bethan Miles | 1 | 1 | 0 | – | – | – |
| Kalea Moore | – | – | – | 7 | 7 | 0 |
| Bryony Smith | 4 | 4 | 1 | 7 | 7 | 2 |
| Lauren Smith | 2 | 2 | 1 | – | – | – |
| Rhianna Southby | 5 | 5 | 1 | – | – | – |
| Jemima Spence | 3 | 3 | 0 | – | – | – |
| Alexa Stonehouse | 7 | 7 | 1 | 6 | 6 | 3 |
| Kirstie White | 5 | 5 | 4 | 2 | 2 | 0 |
Source: ESPN Cricinfo

=== Wicket-keeping ===
| Player | Rachael Heyhoe Flint Trophy | | | | Charlotte Edwards Cup | | | |
| Player | Matches | Innings | Catches | Stumpings | Matches | Innings | Catches | Stumpings |
|---|---|---|---|---|---|---|---|---|
| Kira Chathli | 7 | 7 | 5 | 1 | 7 | 7 | 2 | 1 |
Source: ESPN Cricinfo
