= 2024 South East Stars season =

English cricket season

South East Stars
2024 season
- Coach: Johann Myburgh
- Captain: Bryony Smith
- Overseas player: (South Africa) Tazmin Brits (Note: Ruled out due to injury.) (Australia) Georgia Redmayne
- RHFT: Runners-up
- CEC: Runners-up
- Most runs: RHFT: Alice Davidson-Richards (650); CEC: Sophia Dunkley (265)
- Most wickets: RHFT: Ryana MacDonald-Gay (21); CEC: Matilda Corteen-Coleman (16)
- Most catches: RHFT: Phoebe Franklin (15); CEC: Paige Scholfield (4)
- Most wicket-keeping dismissals: RHFT: Chloe Hill (10); CEC: Georgia Redmayne (4) & Chloe Hill (4)

The 2024 season was South East Stars' fifth season, in which they competed in the 50 over Rachael Heyhoe Flint Trophy and the Twenty20 Charlotte Edwards Cup. In the Charlotte Edwards Cup, the side finished second in the group stages, winning seven of their ten matches to progress to the knockout stages. They defeated Southern Vipers in the semi-final before losing to The Blaze in the final. In the Rachael Heyhoe Flint Trophy, the side again finished second in the group, winning nine of their fourteen matches and progressing to the knockout stages. In the semi-final, they again defeated Southern Vipers before losing to Sunrisers in the final.

The side was captained by Bryony Smith and coached by Johann Myburgh. They played ten home matches at the County Ground, Beckenham, two at The Oval and one at St Lawrence Ground.

This was South East Stars' final season in existence, effectively being replaced by a professionalised Surrey team under the England and Wales Cricket Board's changes to the structure of women's domestic cricket from 2025 onwards.

== Squad ==
=== Departures ===
On 6 December 2023, it was announced that Freya Davies had left the side, joining Southern Vipers. On 25 August 2024, it was announced that the side had loaned out Academy player Darcey Carter to North West Thunder.

=== Arrivals ===
On 18 October 2023, it was announced that Chloe Hill was joining the side on a permanent basis from Southern Vipers, having been on loan to South East Stars for parts of the 2023 season. On 26 January 2024, it was announced that South East Stars had signed Tazmin Brits as an overseas player from April to July 2024. Brits had previously played for the side in 2023. On 5 April 2024, it was announced that Matilda Corteen-Coleman had been added to the squad on a Pay As You Play contract. On 14 April 2024, Brits was ruled out of her stint with the side due to injury. On 10 May 2024, it was announced that the side had signed Georgia Redmayne as an overseas player, for the latter stages of the Charlotte Edwards Cup and four matches in the Rachael Heyhoe Flint Trophy.

=== Squad list ===
- Age given is at the start of South East Stars' first match of the season (20 April 2024).

Name	Nationality	Birth date	Batting Style	Bowling Style	Notes
Batters
Madeleine Blinkhorn-Jones	England	20 April 2003 (aged 21)	Right-handed	—	
Tazmin Brits	South Africa	8 January 1991 (aged 33)	Right-handed	—	Overseas player; April to July 2024; ruled out due to injury
Aylish Cranstone	England	28 August 1994 (aged 29)	Left-handed	Left-arm medium	
Kirstie White	England	14 March 1988 (aged 36)	Right-handed	Right-arm medium	
All-rounders
Alice Capsey	England	11 August 2004 (aged 19)	Right-handed	Right-arm off break	
Priyanaz Chatterji	Scotland	12 August 1993 (aged 30)	Right-handed	Right-arm medium	
Alice Davidson-Richards	England	29 May 1994 (aged 29)	Right-handed	Right-arm fast-medium	
Sophia Dunkley	England	16 July 1998 (aged 25)	Right-handed	Right-arm leg break	
Phoebe Franklin	England	18 February 1998 (aged 26)	Right-handed	Right-arm medium	
Emma Jones	England	8 August 2002 (aged 21)	Right-handed	Right-arm medium	
Ryana MacDonald-Gay	England	12 February 2004 (aged 20)	Right-handed	Right-arm medium	
Kalea Moore	England	27 March 2003 (aged 21)	Right-handed	Right-arm off break	
Paige Scholfield	England	19 December 1995 (aged 28)	Right-handed	Right-arm medium	
Bryony Smith	England	12 December 1997 (aged 26)	Right-handed	Right-arm off break	Captain
Wicket-keepers
Kira Chathli	England	29 July 1999 (aged 24)	Right-handed	—	
Chloe Hill	England	3 January 1997 (aged 27)	Right-handed	—	
Georgia Redmayne	Australia	8 December 1993 (aged 30)	Right-handed	—	Overseas player; June 2024
Jemima Spence	England	6 July 2006 (aged 17)	Right-handed	—	
Bowlers
Claudie Cooper	England	1 May 2002 (aged 21)	Right-handed	Right-arm off break	
Matilda Corteen-Coleman	England	23 August 2007 (aged 16)	Right-handed	Slow left-arm orthodox	
Tash Farrant	England	29 May 1996 (aged 27)	Left-handed	Left-arm medium	
Charlotte Lambert	England	22 June 2006 (aged 17)	Right-handed	Right-arm medium	
Danielle Gregory	England	4 December 1998 (aged 25)	Right-handed	Right-arm leg break	
Bethan Miles	England	25 November 2003 (aged 20)	Right-handed	Slow left-arm orthodox	
Alexa Stonehouse	England	5 December 2004 (aged 19)	Right-handed	Left-arm medium	

== Rachael Heyhoe Flint Trophy ==
=== Season standings ===
Pos	Team	Pld	W	L	T	NR	BP	Pts	NRR
1	Northern Diamonds (Q)	14	9	4	0	1	3	41	0.097
2	South East Stars (Q)	14	9	5	0	0	4	40	0.246
3	Southern Vipers (Q)	14	7	6	0	1	4	34	0.534
4	Sunrisers (Q)	14	7	6	0	1	4	34	−0.122
5	The Blaze	14	7	6	0	1	1	31	−0.176
6	North West Thunder	14	5	8	0	1	3	25	−0.013
7	Central Sparks	14	5	8	0	1	3	25	−0.299
8	Western Storm	14	4	10	0	0	2	18	−0.211

Source: ESPNCricinfo

advanced to the Semi-finals

=== Fixtures ===
20 April 2024
10:30
Scorecard

Southern Vipers; 273/9 (50 overs)	v	South East Stars; 274/6 (49.3 overs)
Freya Kemp 50 (47); Ryana MacDonald-Gay 3/46 (9 overs)		Tash Farrant 94 (97); Charli Knott 2/35 (10 overs)

South East Stars won by 4 wickets
County Ground, Beckenham
Umpires: James Tredwell and Sophie McLelland

- South East Stars won the toss and elected to bowl.
- Points: South East Stars 4, Southern Vipers 0

24 April 2024
10:30
Scorecard

The Blaze; 126 (42 overs)	v	South East Stars; 127/2 (23.3 overs)
Kirstie Gordon 41* (86); Ryana MacDonald-Gay 5/31 (10 overs)		Tash Farrant 68* (81); Kirstie Gordon 1/29 (7 overs)

South East Stars won by 8 wickets
Grace Road, Leicester
Umpires: Jasmine Naeem and Paul Baldwin

- The Blaze won the toss and elected to bat.
- Points: South East Stars 5, The Blaze 0

27 April 2024
10:30
Scorecard

South East Stars; 268 (49.4 overs)	v	Central Sparks; 119/6 (30 overs)
Paige Scholfield 65 (66); Hannah Baker 5/45 (10 overs)		Issy Wong 34* (43); Ryana MacDonald-Gay 4/18 (8 overs)

South East Stars won by 71 runs (DLS)
County Ground, Beckenham
Umpires: James Tredwell and Sophie McLelland

- South East Stars won the toss and elected to bat.
- Central Sparks innings curtailed at 30 overs due to rain; target was 191.
- Points: South East Stars 5, Central Sparks 0

1 May 2024
10:30
Scorecard

South East Stars; 298/5 (44 overs)	v	Western Storm; 236/5 (36 overs)
Paige Scholfield 74 (68); Niamh Holland 2/59 (7 overs)		Fran Wilson 65 (61); Bethan Miles 2/47 (5 overs)

Western Storm won by 8 runs (DLS)
County Ground, Taunton
Umpires: Anthony Harris and Gabi Brown

- Western Storm won the toss and elected to bowl.
- Match reduced to 44 overs per side due to rain.
- Western Storm innings curtailed at 36 overs due to rain; target was 229.
- Points: Western Storm 4, South East Stars 0

4 May 2024
10:30
Scorecard

Sunrisers; 222/9 (50 overs)	v	South East Stars; 223/5 (47.5 overs)
Florence Miller 30 (33); Kalea Moore 2/42 (9 overs)		Sophia Dunkley 67 (89); Mady Villiers 2/43 (10 overs)

South East Stars won by 5 wickets
County Ground, Northampton
Umpires: Neil Bainton and Joanne Ibbotson

- Sunrisers won the toss and elected to bat.
- Points: South East Stars 4, Sunrisers 0

8 May 2024
10:30
Scorecard

Northern Diamonds; 311/9 (50 overs)	v	South East Stars; 308/9 (50 overs)
Hollie Armitage 66 (70); Phoebe Franklin 3/49 (10 overs)		Sophia Dunkley 130 (136); Erin Burns 2/62 (10 overs)

Northern Diamonds won by 3 runs
County Ground, Beckenham
Umpires: Julia Jarvis and Surendiran Shanmugam

- Northern Diamonds won the toss and elected to bat.
- Points: Northern Diamonds 4, South East Stars 0

30 June 2024
10:30
Scorecard

The Blaze; 318/8 (44 overs)	v	South East Stars; 185 (32 overs)
Sarah Bryce 81 (71); Tash Farrant 2/67 (7 overs)		Alice Davidson-Richards 44 (33); Heather Graham 6/39 (6 overs)

The Blaze won by 133 runs (DLS)
County Ground, Beckenham
Umpires: Jack Shantry and Sophie McLelland

- South East Stars won the toss and elected to bowl.
- Match reduced to 44 overs per side due to rain.
- Points: The Blaze 5, South East Stars 0

7 July 2024
10:30
Scorecard

South East Stars; 283 (49.4 overs)	v	North West Thunder; 201 (42.3 overs)
Bryony Smith 67 (71); Hannah Jones 3/56 (10 overs)		Fi Morris 37 (56); Ryana MacDonald-Gay 4/34 (7.3 overs)

South East Stars won by 82 runs
Stanley Park, Blackpool
Umpires: Hassan Adnan and Joanne Ibbotson

- South East Stars won the toss and elected to bat.
- Points: South East Stars 5, North West Thunder 0

10 July 2024
10:30
Scorecard

South East Stars; 120 (40.3 overs)	v	Southern Vipers; 121/3 (22.5 overs)
Alice Davidson-Richards 35 (58); Freya Davies 4/14 (8.3 overs)		Charli Knott 57* (69); Bryony Smith 2/26 (5.1 overs)

Southern Vipers won by 7 wickets
Falkland Cricket Club, Newbury
Umpires: Gabi Brown and James Tredwell

- Southern Vipers won the toss and elected to bowl.
- Points: Southern Vipers 5, South East Stars 0

14 July 2024
10:30
Scorecard

South East Stars; 258 (49.5 overs)	v	Sunrisers; 214 (47.5 overs)
Bryony Smith 84 (111); Jodi Grewcock 3/43 (10 overs)		Alice Macleod 44 (54); Danielle Gregory 3/47 (10 overs)

South East Stars won by 44 runs
County Ground, Beckenham
Umpires: Ben Peverall and Rose Dovey

- South East Stars won the toss and elected to bat.
- Points: South East Stars 4, Sunrisers 0

26 August 2024
10:30
Scorecard

North West Thunder; 250/8 (50 overs)	v	South East Stars; 130 (36.4 overs)
Seren Smale 76 (87); Ryana MacDonald-Gay 3/42 (10 overs)		Kira Chathli 54 (74); Kate Cross 6/40 (8.4 overs)

North West Thunder won by 120 runs
County Ground, Beckenham
Umpires: Julia Jarvis and Neil Bainton

- North West Thunder won the toss and elected to bat.
- Points: North West Thunder 5, South East Stars 0

31 August 2024
10:30
Scorecard

Western Storm; 282/8 (50 overs)	v	South East Stars; 283/5 (47.2 overs)
Fran Wilson 81 (92); Bryony Smith 2/43 (7 overs)		Kira Chathli 86* (81); Alex Griffiths 1/29 (3 overs)

South East Stars won by 5 wickets
County Ground, Beckenham
Umpires: Anthony Harris and Julia Jarvis

- Western Storm won the toss and elected to bat.
- Points: South East Stars 4, Western Storm 0

4 September 2024
10:30
Scorecard

South East Stars; 270 (49.5 overs)	v	Central Sparks; 250/9 (50 overs)
Kira Chathli 80 (78); Katie George 4/47 (10 overs)		Bethan Ellis 57 (83); Alexa Stonehouse 3/37 (8 overs)

South East Stars won by 20 runs
Scorers, Shirley
Umpires: Gabi Brown and Mark Newell

- Central Sparks won the toss and elected to bowl.
- Points: South East Stars 4, Central Sparks 0

7 September 2024
10:30
Scorecard

South East Stars; 275/8 (50 overs)	v	Northern Diamonds; 119 (36.1 overs)
Alice Davidson-Richards 79 (79); Beth Langston 2/44 (10 overs)		Phoebe Turner 49* (78); Alexa Stonehouse 4/27 (10 overs)

South East Stars won by 156 runs
Riverside Ground, Chester-le-Street
Umpires: Joanne Ibbotson and Tom Lungley

- Northern Diamonds won the toss and elected to bowl.
- Points: South East Stars 5, Northern Diamonds 0

==== Semi-final ====
14 September 2024
10:30
Scorecard

Southern Vipers; 219/9 (50 overs)	v	South East Stars; 221/7 (48.5 overs)
Nancy Harman 42 (59); Matilda Corteen-Coleman 3/33 (10 overs)		Alice Davidson-Richards 90* (109); Georgia Elwiss 3/39 (10 overs)

South East Stars won by 3 wickets
County Ground, Beckenham
Umpires: Neil Bainton and Sue Redfern

- Southern Vipers won the toss and elected to bat.

==== Final ====
21 September 2024
10:30
Scorecard

South East Stars; 212 (46.2 overs)	v	Sunrisers; 123/3 (25 overs)
Alice Davidson-Richards 93 (105); Kate Coppack 4/27 (10 overs)		Cordelia Griffith 57 (68); Kalea Moore 2/29 (8 overs)

Sunrisers won by 27 runs (DLS)
Grace Road, Leicester
Umpires: Jack Shantry and James Tredwell
Player of the match: Kate Coppack (Sunrisers)

- Sunrisers won the toss and elected to bowl.
- No further play was possible due to rain.

=== Tournament statistics ===
==== Batting ====
Player	Matches	Innings	Runs	Average	High score	100s	50s
Alice Davidson-Richards	16	15	650	46.42	93	0	7
Bryony Smith	12	12	413	34.41	90	0	3
Aylish Cranstone	16	14	347	2669	63*	0	1
Sophia Dunkley	5	5	293	97.66	130	1	1
Tash Farrant	7	7	280	46.66	94	0	3
Phoebe Franklin	15	14	259	19.92	37	0	0
Paige Scholfield	10	9	252	28.00	74	0	3
Kira Chathli	6	6	251	50.20	86*	0	3

Source: ESPN Cricinfo Qualification: 200 runs.

==== Bowling ====
Player	Matches	Overs	Wickets	Average	Economy	BBI	5wi
Ryana MacDonald-Gay	10	72.2	21	16.71	4.85	5/31	1
Kalea Moore	14	96.1	19	23.73	4.68	3/10	0
Alexa Stonehouse	11	68.0	15	23.73	5.23	4/27	0
Phoebe Franklin	15	97.4	13	36.92	4.91	3/49	0
Danielle Gregory	16	113.4	11	48.63	4.70	3/47	0

Source: ESPN Cricinfo Qualification: 10 wickets.

== Charlotte Edwards Cup ==
=== Season standings ===
Pos	Team	Pld	W	L	T	NR	BP	Pts	NRR
1	The Blaze (Q)	10	9	1	0	0	3	39	0.606
2	South East Stars (Q)	10	7	2	0	1	4	34	0.309
3	Southern Vipers (Q)	10	6	4	0	0	2	26	1.001
4	Central Sparks (Q)	10	6	4	0	0	2	26	0.402
5	North West Thunder	10	3	6	0	1	1	15	−0.727
6	Northern Diamonds	10	3	7	0	0	1	13	−0.067
7	Western Storm	10	2	6	0	2	1	13	−0.659
8	Sunrisers	10	2	8	0	0	0	8	−1.073

Source: ESPNCricinfo

advanced to the Semi-finals

=== Fixtures ===
19 May 2024
14:30
Scorecard

South East Stars; 132/9 (20 overs)	v	Western Storm; 128/6 (20 overs)
Aylish Cranstone 31 (20); Amanda-Jade Wellington 3/22 (4 overs)		Emma Corney 40 (37); Danielle Gregory 1/18 (3 overs)

South East Stars won by 4 runs
County Ground, Bristol
Umpires: Ben Peverall and Grace Bambury

- South East Stars won the toss and elected to bat.
- Points: South East Stars 4, Western Storm 0

24 May 2024
14:30
Scorecard

North West Thunder; 139/7 (20 overs)	v	South East Stars; 140/5 (16 overs)
Fi Morris 41 (27); Tash Farrant 2/17 (4 overs)		Paige Scholfield 73* (39); Tara Norris 1/13 (3 overs)

South East Stars won by 5 wickets
County Ground, Beckenham
Umpires: Ben Peverall and Rose Dovey

- South East Stars won the toss and elected to bowl.
- Points: South East Stars 5, North West Thunder 0

27 May 2024
14:30
Scorecard

Western Storm; 38/3 (6 overs)	v	South East Stars
Niamh Holland 20 (18); Tash Farrant 1/8 (2 overs)

No result
County Ground, Beckenham
Umpires: Fiona Richards and James Tredwell

- South East Stars won the toss and elected to bowl.
- No further play possible due to rain.
- Points: South East Stars 2, Western Storm 2

31 May 2024
14:30
Scorecard

Northern Diamonds; 124 (19.3 overs)	v	South East Stars; 127/4 (16 overs)
Leah Dobson 55 (46); Matilda Corteen-Coleman 5/19 (3.3 overs)		Bryony Smith 57 (41); Hollie Armitage 2/22 (3 overs)

South East Stars won by 6 wickets
Riverside Ground, Chester-le-Street
Umpires: Jasmine Naeem and Naeem Ashraf

- Northern Diamonds won the toss and elected to bat.
- Matilda Corteen-Coleman took four wickets in four balls.
- Points: South East Stars 5, Northern Diamonds 0

2 June 2024
13:30
Scorecard

Southern Vipers; 142/6 (20 overs)	v	South East Stars; 146/4 (18.1 overs)
Alice Monaghan 44* (33); Danielle Gregory 3/23 (4 overs)		Sophia Dunkley 53 (42); Charli Knott 2/29 (4 overs)

South East Stars won by 6 wickets
The Oval, London
Umpires: James Tredwell and Rose Dovey

- South East Stars won the toss and elected to bowl.
- Points: South East Stars 4, Southern Vipers 0

6 June 2024
14:15
Scorecard

Sunrisers; 116/8 (20 overs)	v	South East Stars; 118/4 (15 overs)
Florence Miller 39* (45); Emma Jones 2/13 (2 overs)		Paige Scholfield 50* (35); Jodi Grewcock 2/18 (3 overs)

South East Stars won by 6 wickets
Lord's, London
Umpires: Jack Shantry and Joanne Ibbotson

- South East Stars won the toss and elected to bowl.
- Points: South East Stars 5, Sunrisers 0

9 June 2024
11:00
Scorecard

South East Stars; 122/8 (20 overs)	v	Central Sparks; 123/7 (19.2 overs)
Sophia Dunkley 58 (49); Emily Arlott 4/21 (4 overs)		Evelyn Jones 43 (52); Matilda Corteen-Coleman 3/14 (4 overs)

Central Sparks won by 3 wickets
St Lawrence Ground, Canterbury
Umpires: James Tredwell and Julia Jarvis

- South East Stars won the toss and elected to bat.
- Emily Arlott took a hat-trick.
- Points: Central Sparks 4, South East Stars 0

15 June 2024
14:30
Scorecard

South East Stars; 153/4 (18 overs)	v	Sunrisers; 111/5 (15.5 overs)
Georgia Redmayne 38* (40); Mady Villiers 2/23 (4 overs)		Grace Scrivens 62* (48); Danielle Gregory 2/21 (3 overs)

South East Stars won by 19 runs (DLS)
The Oval, London
Umpires: Ben Peverall and Gabi Brown

- Sunrisers won the toss and elected to bowl.
- Points: South East Stars 4, Sunrisers 0

16 June 2024
11:30
Scorecard

The Blaze; 84 (18.5 overs)	v	South East Stars; 89/5 (15.1 overs)
Sarah Glenn 21 (24); Alexa Stonehouse 3/13 (4 overs)		Emma Jones 30* (15); Sarah Glenn 3/14 (4 overs)

South East Stars won by 5 wickets
County Ground, Derby
Umpires: Rob White and Sophie McLelland

- The Blaze won the toss and elected to bat.
- Points: South East Stars 5, The Blaze 0

19 June 2024
11:30
Scorecard

Southern Vipers; 179/5 (20 overs)	v	South East Stars; 66 (14 overs)
Maia Bouchier 93 (55); Tash Farrant 2/34 (3 overs)		Bryony Smith 22 (9); Charlie Dean 3/5 (3 overs)

Southern Vipers won by 113 runs
County Ground, Hove
Umpires: Fiona Richards and James Tredwell

- South East Stars won the toss and elected to bowl.
- Points: Southern Vipers 5, South East Stars 0

==== Semi-final ====
22 June 2024
14:30 BST
Scorecard

South East Stars; 162/5 (20 overs)	v	Southern Vipers; 157/9 (20 overs)
Sophia Dunkley 49 (34); Linsey Smith 1/20 (4 overs)		Charlie Dean 43 (29); Matilda Corteen-Coleman 2/23 (4 overs)

South East Stars won by 5 runs
County Cricket Ground, Derby
Umpires: Gabi Brown and James Tredwell
Player of the match: Georgia Redmayne (South East Stars)

- Southern Vipers won the toss and elected to bowl.

==== Final ====
22 June 2024
18:45 BST (D/N)
Scorecard

South East Stars; 141/9 (20 overs)	v	The Blaze; 144/3 (18.4 overs)
Georgia Redmayne 25 (25); Heather Graham 3/16 (4 overs)		Kathryn Bryce 62 (45); Danielle Gregory 1/26 (4 overs)

The Blaze won by 7 wickets
County Cricket Ground, Derby
Umpires: Anna Harris and Rob White
Player of the match: Kathryn Bryce (The Blaze)

- The Blaze won the toss and elected to bowl.

=== Tournament statistics ===
==== Batting ====
Player	Matches	Innings	Runs	Average	High score	100s	50s
Sophia Dunkley	9	9	265	29.44	58	0	2
Paige Scholfield	10	9	259	43.16	73	0	3
Bryony Smith	12	11	206	20.60	57*	0	1

Source: ESPN Cricinfo Qualification: 150 runs.

==== Bowling ====
Player	Matches	Overs	Wickets	Average	Economy	BBI	5wi
Matilda Corteen-Coleman	11	41.2	16	13.31	5.15	5/19	1
Danielle Gregory	12	41.0	14	17.71	6.04	3/23	0

Source: ESPN Cricinfo Qualification: 10 wickets.

== Season statistics ==
=== Batting ===
Player	Rachael Heyhoe Flint Trophy								Charlotte Edwards Cup							
Player	Matches	Innings	Runs	High score	Average	Strike rate	100s	50s	Matches	Innings	Runs	High score	Average	Strike rate	100s	50s
Madeleine Blinkhorn-Jones	1	1	2	2	2.00	25.00	0	0	1	1	1	1	1.00	20.00	0	0
Kira Chathli	6	6	251	86*	50.20	89.64	0	3	–	–	–	–	–	–	–	–
Priyanaz Chatterji	3	3	28	17*	14.00	60.86	0	0	–	–	–	–	–	–	–	–
Matilda Corteen-Coleman	8	5	3	1*	0.75	30.00	0	0	11	3	6	4*	–	42.85	0	0
Aylish Cranstone	16	14	347	63*	26.69	99.42	0	1	7	4	50	31	25.00	104.16	0	0
Alice Davidson-Richards	16	15	650	93	46.42	85.19	0	7	8	7	86	43	17.20	145.76	0	0
Sophia Dunkley	5	5	293	130	97.66	83.00	1	1	9	9	265	58	29.44	123.83	0	2
Tash Farrant	7	7	280	94	46.66	85.36	0	3	8	7	41	16	5.85	78.84	0	0
Phoebe Franklin	15	14	259	37	19.92	84.36	0	0	11	9	110	23	13.75	97.34	0	0
Danielle Gregory	16	9	15	6*	2.50	24.19	0	0	12	3	20	12*	10.00	80.00	0	0
Chloe Hill	15	12	178	31	19.77	63.34	0	0	8	5	9	4	3.00	47.36	0	0
Emma Jones	5	5	56	47	11.20	75.67	0	0	6	6	90	36	18.00	140.62	0	0
Ryana MacDonald-Gay	10	9	159	51*	31.80	87.36	0	1	11	3	13	9	6.50	72.22	0	0
Bethan Miles	6	3	13	13	4.33	35.13	0	0	–	–	–	–	–	–	–	–
Kalea Moore	14	11	159	52*	19.87	58.88	0	1	8	4	21	8	10.50	80.76	0	0
Georgia Redmayne	–	–	–	–	–	–	–	–	4	4	125	39	41.66	96.89	0	0
Paige Scholfield	10	9	252	74	28.00	95.45	0	3	10	9	259	73*	43.16	140.00	0	3
Bryony Smith	12	12	413	90	34.41	87.68	0	3	12	11	206	57*	20.60	124.84	0	1
Alexa Stonehouse	11	10	131	29	14.55	56.46	0	0	6	2	12	9	6.00	50.00	0	0
Source: ESPN Cricinfo

=== Bowling ===
Player	Rachael Heyhoe Flint Trophy							Charlotte Edwards Cup						
Player	Matches	Overs	Wickets	Average	Economy	BBI	5wi	Matches	Overs	Wickets	Average	Economy	BBI	5wi
Priyanaz Chatterji	3	7.0	1	35.00	5.00	1/28	0	–	–	–	–	–	–	–
Matilda Corteen-Coleman	8	60.2	9	26.00	3.87	3/33	0	11	41.2	16	13.31	5.15	5/19	1
Alice Davidson-Richards	16	29.0	5	24.80	4.27	2/22	0	8	5.0	1	38.00	7.60	1/12	0
Sophia Dunkley	5	4.0	2	11.00	5.50	2/22	0	9	4.0	1	35.00	8.75	1/5	0
Tash Farrant	7	34.4	5	40.40	5.82	2/67	0	8	27.2	9	21.11	6.95	2/17	0
Phoebe Franklin	15	97.4	13	36.92	4.91	3/49	0	11	20.0	3	54.33	8.15	1/23	0
Danielle Gregory	16	113.4	11	48.63	4.70	3/47	0	12	14.0	14	17.71	6.04	3/23	0
Emma Jones	5	12.0	1	87.00	7.25	1/13	0	6	8.0	3	22.66	8.50	2/13	0
Ryana MacDonald-Gay	10	72.2	21	16.71	4.85	5/31	1	11	26.4	8	24.25	7.27	2/9	0
Bethan Miles	6	31.0	5	38.80	6.25	2/47	0	–	–	–	–	–	–	–
Kalea Moore	14	96.1	19	23.73	4.68	3/10	0	8	18.0	2	67.00	7.44	1/14	0
Paige Scholfield	10	2.0	0	–	10.50	–	0	10	–	–	–	–	–	–
Bryony Smith	12	48.3	9	23.55	4.37	2/26	0	12	10.0	4	20.00	8.00	2/32	0
Alexa Stonehouse	11	68.0	15	23.73	5.23	4/27	0	6	16.5	7	14.14	5.88	3/13	0
Source: ESPN Cricinfo

=== Fielding ===
Player	Rachael Heyhoe Flint Trophy			Charlotte Edwards Cup		
Player	Matches	Innings	Catches	Matches	Innings	Catches
Madeleine Blinkhorn-Jones	1	1	0	1	1	1
Priyanaz Chatterji	3	3	1	–	–	–
Matilda Corteen-Coleman	8	8	0	11	11	2
Aylish Cranstone	16	16	5	7	7	1
Alice Davidson-Richards	16	16	4	8	8	3
Sophia Dunkley	5	5	2	9	9	2
Tash Farrant	7	7	2	8	8	2
Phoebe Franklin	15	15	15	11	11	3
Danielle Gregory	16	16	1	12	12	2
Chloe Hill	15	5	2	8	–	–
Emma Jones	5	5	5	6	6	2
Ryana MacDonald-Gay	10	10	6	11	11	3
Bethan Miles	6	6	0	–	–	–
Kalea Moore	14	14	3	8	8	2
Paige Scholfield	10	10	4	10	10	4
Bryony Smith	12	12	1	12	12	2
Alexa Stonehouse	11	11	0	6	6	2
Source: ESPN Cricinfo

=== Wicket-keeping ===
Player	Rachael Heyhoe Flint Trophy				Charlotte Edwards Cup			
Player	Matches	Innings	Catches	Stumpings	Matches	Innings	Catches	Stumpings
Kira Chathli	6	6	5	0	–	–	–	–
Chloe Hill	15	10	6	4	8	8	1	3
Georgia Redmayne	–	–	–	–	4	4	2	2
Source: ESPN Cricinfo
