= 2023 South East Stars season =

English cricket season

South East Stars
2023 season
- Coach: Johann Myburgh
- Captain: Bryony Smith
- Overseas player: (South Africa) Tazmin Brits
- RHFT: 3rd
- CEC: 5th
- Most runs: RHFT: Paige Scholfield (439); CEC: Bryony Smith (256)
- Most wickets: RHFT: Danielle Gregory (21); CEC: Danielle Gregory (7) & Phoebe Franklin (7)
- Most catches: RHFT: Paige Scholfield (9); CEC: Aylish Cranstone (3) & Tash Farrant (3)
- Most wicket-keeping dismissals: RHFT: Kira Chathli (17); CEC: Kira Chathli (4)

The 2023 season was South East Stars' fourth season, in which they competed in the 50 over Rachael Heyhoe Flint Trophy and the Twenty20 Charlotte Edwards Cup. In the Charlotte Edwards Cup, the side finished fifth in the group, winning three of their seven matches. In the Rachael Heyhoe Flint Trophy, the side finished third in the group, winning seven of their fourteen matches and progressing to the play-off. In the play-off, they lost to The Blaze by 8 wickets (DLS).

The side was captained by Bryony Smith and coached by Johann Myburgh. They played seven home matches at the County Ground, Beckenham, two at Woodbridge Road, Guildford and one apiece at The Oval and St Lawrence Ground.

== Squad ==
=== Departures ===
On 3 November 2022, it was announced that Chloe Brewer had left the side, signing for Central Sparks. On 4 November 2022, it was announced that Eva Gray had left the side, signing for Sunrisers. On 7 November 2022, it was announced that Rhianna Southby had left the side, signing for Southern Vipers. Ahead of the 2023 season, it was confirmed that Grace Gibbs, Madeleine Blinkhorn-Jones, Sydney Gorham were no longer in the side's full squad, and that Megan Sturge had joined the Southern Vipers Academy.

=== Arrivals ===
On 4 November 2022, it was announced that South East Stars had signed Paige Scholfield from Southern Vipers. On 4 June 2023, Chloe Hill was signed on loan from Southern Vipers for June and July, and Darcey Carter was promoted from the academy to the senior squad. On 7 June 2023, Charlotte Lambert was promoted from the academy to the senior squad. On 14 June 2023, it was announced that Tazmin Brits had been signed as an overseas player, for four Rachael Heyhoe Flint Trophy matches in July. On 1 July 2023, academy players Madeleine Blinkhorn-Jones and Emily Burke were included in a matchday squad for the first time, and the signing of Scotland international Priyanaz Chatterji was confirmed. On 31 August 2023, Chloe Hill's loan was renewed for the remainder of the season.

=== Personnel and contract changes ===
On 4 November 2022, it was announced that Kira Chathli, Phoebe Franklin, Kalea Moore, Alexa Stonehouse, Ryana MacDonald-Gay and Emma Jones had all signed their first professional contracts with the side.

=== Squad list ===
- Age given is at the start of South East Stars' first match of the season (22 April 2023).

Name	Nationality	Birth date	Batting Style	Bowling Style	Notes
Batters
Madeleine Blinkhorn-Jones	England	20 April 2003 (aged 20)	Right-handed	—	Joined July 2023
Tazmin Brits	South Africa	8 January 1991 (aged 32)	Right-handed	—	Overseas player; July 2023
Aylish Cranstone	England	28 August 1994 (aged 28)	Left-handed	Left-arm medium	
Kirstie White	England	14 March 1988 (aged 35)	Right-handed	Right-arm medium	
All-rounders
Emily Burke	England	30 November 2004 (aged 18)	Right-handed	Right-arm medium	Joined July 2023
Alice Capsey	England	11 August 2004 (aged 18)	Right-handed	Right-arm off break	
Priyanaz Chatterji	Scotland	12 August 1993 (aged 29)	Right-handed	Right-arm medium	Joined July 2023
Alice Davidson-Richards	England	29 May 1994 (aged 28)	Right-handed	Right-arm fast-medium	
Sophia Dunkley	England	16 July 1998 (aged 24)	Right-handed	Right-arm leg break	
Phoebe Franklin	England	18 February 1998 (aged 25)	Right-handed	Right-arm medium	
Emma Jones	England	8 August 2002 (aged 20)	Right-handed	Right-arm medium	
Ryana MacDonald-Gay	England	12 February 2004 (aged 19)	Right-handed	Right-arm medium	
Kalea Moore	England	27 March 2003 (aged 20)	Right-handed	Right-arm off break	
Paige Scholfield	England	19 December 1995 (aged 27)	Right-handed	Right-arm medium	
Bryony Smith	England	12 December 1997 (aged 25)	Right-handed	Right-arm off break	Captain
Wicket-keepers
Kira Chathli	England	29 July 1999 (aged 23)	Right-handed	—	
Chloe Hill	England	3 January 1997 (aged 26)	Right-handed	—	Two loan spells from Southern Vipers; June–July 2023 and September 2023
Jemima Spence	England	6 July 2006 (aged 16)	Right-handed	—	
Bowlers
Claudie Cooper	England	1 May 2002 (aged 20)	Right-handed	Right-arm off break	
Freya Davies	England	27 October 1995 (aged 27)	Right-handed	Right-arm fast-medium	
Tash Farrant	England	29 May 1996 (aged 26)	Left-handed	Left-arm medium	
Darcey Carter	Scotland	31 May 2005 (aged 17)	Right-handed	Right-arm medium	Joined June 2023
Charlotte Lambert	England	22 June 2006 (aged 16)	Right-handed	Right-arm medium	Joined June 2023
Danielle Gregory	England	4 December 1998 (aged 24)	Right-handed	Right-arm leg break	
Bethan Miles	England	25 November 2003 (aged 19)	Right-handed	Slow left-arm orthodox	
Alexa Stonehouse	England	5 December 2004 (aged 18)	Right-handed	Left-arm medium	

== Rachael Heyhoe Flint Trophy ==
=== Season standings ===
Pos	Team	Pld	W	L	T	NR	BP	Pts	NRR
1	Southern Vipers (Q)	14	7	4	1	2	4	38	0.457
2	The Blaze (Q)	14	7	4	0	3	4	38	0.173
3	South East Stars (Q)	14	7	6	0	1	6	36	0.583
4	Sunrisers	14	6	5	0	3	2	32	−0.006
5	Central Sparks	14	6	5	1	2	1	31	−0.233
6	Northern Diamonds	14	6	7	0	1	4	30	−0.034
7	North West Thunder	14	3	5	2	4	2	26	−0.274
8	Western Storm	14	2	8	0	4	0	16	−1.068

Source: England and Wales Cricket Board

advanced to the final advanced to the play-off

=== Fixtures ===
22 April 2023
10:30
Scorecard

South East Stars; 334/5 (50 overs)	v	North West Thunder; 203 (42 overs)
Paige Scholfield 111* (90); Alex Hartley 1/22 (4 overs)		Deandra Dottin 51 (42); Freya Davies 3/27 (8 overs)

South East Stars won by 131 runs
Old Trafford Cricket Ground, Manchester
Umpires: Anna Harris and Hassan Adnan

- South East Stars won the toss and elected to bat.
- Points: South East Stars 5, North West Thunder 0

29 April 2023
10:30
Scorecard

Southern Vipers; 287/6 (20 overs)	v	South East Stars; 129 (36.5 overs)
Ella McCaughan 67 (95); Alice Davidson-Richards 2/30 (6 overs)		Paige Scholfield 31 (63); Lauren Bell 4/37 (8 overs)

Southern Vipers won by 158 runs
County Ground, Beckenham
Umpires: Rose Dovey and Sue Redfern

- Southern Vipers won the toss and elected to bat.
- Points: Southern Vipers 5, South East Stars 0

1 May 2023
10:30
Scorecard

South East Stars; 296/7 (50 overs)	v	Western Storm; 89 (30.5 overs)
Paige Scholfield 134* (109); Danielle Gibson 3/42 (8 overs)		Alex Griffiths 21 (62); Alice Capsey 6/28 (7.5 overs)

South East Stars won by 207 runs
County Ground, Bristol
Umpires: Anthony Harris and Sophie McLelland

- South East Stars won the toss and elected to bat.
- Points: South East Stars 5, Western Storm 0

5 May 2023
10:30
Scorecard

South East Stars; 151/9 (29 overs)	v	Sunrisers; 64 (17 overs)
Kira Chathli 28 (39); Abtaha Maqsood 4/23 (6 overs)		Cordelia Griffith 27 (29); Danielle Gregory 4/12 (5 overs)

South East Stars won by 91 runs (DLS method)
Brunton Memorial Ground, Radlett
Umpires: Sophie McLelland and Tom Lungley

- Sunrisers won the toss and elected to field.
- Match reduced to 29 overs per side due to rain.
- Sunrisers were set a revised target of 156 runs from 29 overs due to rain.
- Points: South East Stars 5, Sunrisers 0

10 May 2023
10:30
Scorecard

South East Stars; 223 (44.2 overs)	v	Northern Diamonds; 178/7 (35.4 overs)
Sophia Dunkley 101* (101); Jessica Woolston 5/37 (9 overs)		Sterre Kalis 66* (98); Ryana MacDonald-Gay 2/25 (4 overs)

Northern Diamonds won by 3 wickets (DLS method)
North Marine Road Ground, Scarborough
Umpires: Phil Mustard and Jasmine Naeem

- Northern Diamonds won the toss and elected to field.
- Northern Diamonds were set a revised target of 178 runs from 36 overs due to rain.
- Points: Northern Diamonds 5, South East Stars 0

2 July 2023
10:30
Scorecard

South East Stars; 205 (46 overs)	v	Northern Diamonds; 209/3 (33 overs)
Chloe Hill 63 (80); Grace Hall 4/33 (8 overs)		Lauren Winfield-Hill 116* (100); Darcey Carter 2/31 (5 overs)

Northern Diamonds won by 7 wickets
County Ground, Beckenham
Umpires: Fiona Richards and Nigel Llong

- South East Stars won the toss and elected to bat.
- Points: Northern Diamonds 5, South East Stars 0

7 July 2023
10:30
Scorecard

Central Sparks; 246/8 (50 overs)	v	South East Stars; 225 (47.3 overs)
Charis Pavely 57* (52); Alice Davidson-Richards 3/46 (9 overs)		Madeleine Blinkhorn-Jones 77 (80); Katie George 3/30 (9.3 overs)

Central Sparks won by 21 runs
Woodbridge Road, Guildford
Umpires: Julia Jarvis and Mark Newell

- Central Sparks won the toss and elected to bat.
- Points: Central Sparks 4, South East Stars 0

11 July 2023
10:30
Scorecard

South East Stars; 290/9 (50 overs)	v	Sunrisers; 262/7 (48 overs)
Tazmin Brits 112* (72); Jodi Grewcock 3/51 (10 overs)		Cordelia Griffith 92 (113); Danielle Gregory 4/26 (5 overs)

South East Stars won by 19 runs (DLS method)
County Ground, Beckenham
Umpires: Fiona Richards and Simon Widdup

- South East Stars won the toss and elected to bat.
- Sunrisers innings reduced to 48 overs due to rain; target was 282.
- Points: South East Stars 4, Sunrisers 0

17 July 2023
10:30
Scorecard

The Blaze; 159 (46.2 overs)	v	South East Stars; 161/8 (34.3 overs)
Teresa Graves 56 (96); Freya Davies 3/28 (9 overs)		Tazmin Brits 85 (63); Grace Ballinger 3/26 (8 overs)

South East Stars won by 2 wickets (DLS method)
John Fretwell Sporting Complex, Nettleworth
Umpires: Grace Bambury and Chris Watts

- The Blaze won the toss and elected to bat.
- Match reduced to 48 overs per side due to rain; South East Stars target was 159.
- Points: South East Stars 5, The Blaze 0

22 July 2023
10:30
Scorecard

Western Storm; 182/4 (36 overs)	v	South East Stars
Emma Corney 48 (76); Alice Davidson-Richards 2/27 (5 overs)

No result
County Ground, Beckenham
Umpires: James Tredwell and Julia Jarvis

- South East Stars won the toss and elected to field.
- No further play was possible due to rain.
- Points: South East Stars 2, Western Storm 2

5 September 2023
10:30
Scorecard

South East Stars; 145 (37.5 overs)	v	North West Thunder; 147/4 (25.5 overs)
Paige Scholfield 38 (48); Olivia Bell 4/23 (8.5 overs)		Emma Lamb 50 (59); Paige Scholfield 1/8 (4 overs)

North West Thunder won by 6 wickets
Woodbridge Road, Guildford
Umpires: Fiona Richards and Waseem Mohammed

- South East Stars won the toss and elected to bat.
- Points: North West Thunder 5, South East Stars 0

10 September 2023
10:30
Scorecard

South East Stars; 278 (50 overs)	v	The Blaze; 171 (38 overs)
Alice Davidson-Richards 101 (128); Grace Ballinger 4/54 (10 overs)		Kirstie Gordon 40 (39); Danielle Gregory 3/32 (7 overs)

South East Stars won by 107 runs
County Ground, Beckenham
Umpires: Grace Bambury and Surendiran Shanmugam

- South East Stars won the toss and elected to bat.
- Points: South East Stars 5, The Blaze 0

13 September 2023
10:30
Scorecard

Southern Vipers; 254 (48.2 overs)	v	South East Stars; 196 (47.2 overs)
Linsey Smith 51 (58); Danielle Gregory 4/55 (10 overs)		Aylish Cranstone 69 (64); Linsey Smith 3/34 (10 overs)

Southern Vipers won by 58 runs
Arundel Castle Cricket Ground, Arundel
Umpires: Ben Peverall and Rose Dovey

- Southern Vipers won the toss and elected to bat.
- Points: Southern Vipers 5, South East Stars 0

16 September 2023
10:30
Scorecard

South East Stars; 283/7 (50 overs)	v	Central Sparks; 131 (35.1 overs)
Bryony Smith 97 (81); Hannah Baker 2/46 (9 overs)		Maddy Green 39 (48); Alice Davidson-Richards 3/20 (8 overs)

South East Stars won by 152 runs
Edgbaston Cricket Ground, Birmingham
Umpires: Joanne Ibbotson and Naeem Ashraf

- Central Sparks won the toss and elected to field.
- Points: South East Stars 5, Central Sparks 0

==== Play-off ====
21 September 2023
10:30
Scorecard

South East Stars; 148 (43.5 overs)	v	The Blaze; 52/2 (8.4 overs)
Ryana MacDonald-Gay 26 (48); Marie Kelly 2/7 (3 overs)		Sarah Bryce 34* (26); Alexa Stonehouse 1/11 (2 overs)

The Blaze won by 8 wickets (DLS method)
County Ground, Beckenham
Umpires: Grace Bambury and James Tredwell

- South East Stars won the toss and elected to bat.
- The Blaze innings reduced to 10 overs due to rain; target was 52.

=== Tournament statistics ===
==== Batting ====
Player	Matches	Innings	Runs	Average	High score	100s	50s
Paige Scholfield	14	13	439	39.90	134*	2	1
Alice Davidson-Richards	13	12	322	26.83	101	1	1
Bryony Smith	14	13	291	22.38	97	0	2
Kira Chathli	15	14	280	20.00	71	0	2
Tazmin Brits	4	3	214	107.00	112*	1	1

Source: ESPN Cricinfo Qualification: 200 runs.

==== Bowling ====
Player	Matches	Overs	Wickets	Average	Economy	BBI	5wi
Danielle Gregory	15	74.0	21	17.80	5.05	4/12	0
Alice Davidson-Richards	13	61.2	15	20.53	5.02	3/20	0
Ryana MacDonald-Gay	14	67.0	15	23.60	5.28	3/27	0
Freya Davies	7	47.0	11	18.81	4.40	3/27	0
Bryony Smith	14	63.3	10	30.10	4.74	3/13	0

Source: ESPN Cricinfo Qualification: 10 wickets.

== Charlotte Edwards Cup ==
=== Season standings ===
Pos	Team	Pld	W	L	T	NR	BP	Pts	NRR
1	The Blaze (Q)	7	7	0	0	0	4	32	1.765
2	Southern Vipers (Q)	7	5	2	0	0	2	22	0.940
3	North West Thunder (Q)	7	4	3	0	0	2	18	0.331
4	Northern Diamonds	7	4	3	0	0	1	17	−0.129
5	South East Stars	7	3	4	0	0	0	12	−0.096
6	Western Storm	7	3	4	0	0	0	12	−0.512
7	Central Sparks	7	2	5	0	0	0	8	−0.558
8	Sunrisers	7	0	7	0	0	0	0	−1.717

Source: England and Wales Cricket Board

advanced to final advanced to the semi-final

=== Fixtures ===
20 May 2023
14:30 BST
Scorecard

South East Stars; 160/8 (20 overs)	v	The Blaze; 161/5 (19.2 overs)
Phoebe Franklin 53 (43); Nadine de Klerk 3/21 (3 overs)		Georgie Boyce 63* (38); Paige Scholfield 2/26 (4 overs)

The Blaze won by 5 wickets
County Ground, Beckenham
Umpires: Chris Watts and Rose Dovey

- The Blaze won the toss and elected to field.
- Points: The Blaze 4, South East Stars 0

23 May 2023
11:00 BST
Scorecard

South East Stars; 169/6 (20 overs)	v	Southern Vipers; 171/4 (18.5 overs)
Bryony Smith 83 (47); Lauren Bell 2/25 (4 overs)		Danni Wyatt 40 (20); Freya Davies 1/18 (2 overs)

Southern Vipers won by 6 wickets
Falkland Cricket Club, Newbury
Umpires: Ben Peverall and Rose Dovey

- Southern Vipers won the toss and elected to field.
- Points: Southern Vipers 4, South East Stars 0

25 May 2023
14:15 BST
Scorecard

Sunrisers; 132/8 (20 overs)	v	South East Stars; 135/6 (19 overs)
Eva Gray 34* (24); Paige Scholfield 3/24 (4 overs)		Bryony Smith 38 (27); Grace Scrivens 2/22 (4 overs)

South East Stars won by 4 wickets
Lord's, London
Umpires: Rose Dovey and Surendiran Shanmugam

- Sunrisers won the toss and elected to bat.
- Points: South East Stars 4, Sunrisers 0

26 May 2023
13:45 BST
Scorecard

South East Stars; 138/7 (20 overs)	v	Northern Diamonds; 140/8 (20 overs)
Alice Capsey 71 (48); Grace Hall 3/20 (4 overs)		Hollie Armitage 82 (59); Claudie Cooper 3/12 (4 overs)

Northern Diamonds won by 2 wickets
The Oval, London
Umpires: Anna Harris and Ben Debenham

- Northern Diamonds won the toss and elected to field.
- Points: Northern Diamonds 4, South East Stars 0

28 May 2023
14:30 BST
Scorecard

South East Stars; 126/6 (20 overs)	v	Western Storm; 121 (19.5 overs)
Alice Davidson-Richards 43 (45); Orla Prendergast 2/12 (4 overs)		Sophie Luff 43* (46); Freya Davies 2/14 (3.5 overs)

South East Stars won by 5 runs
County Ground, Taunton
Umpires: Rose Dovey and Ben Peverall

- Western Storm won the toss and elected to field.
- Points: South East Stars 4, Western Storm 0

4 June 2023
14:30 BST
Scorecard

North West Thunder; 165/5 (20 overs)	v	South East Stars; 149 (19.2 overs)
Emma Lamb 63 (38); Danielle Gregory 2/14 (3 overs)		Bryony Smith 51 (32); Tara Norris 2/2 (1.2 overs)

North West Thunder won by 16 runs
Stanley Park, Blackpool
Umpires: Naeem Ashraf and Neil Pratt

- North West Thunder won the toss and elected to bat.
- Points: North West Thunder 4, South East Stars 0

7 June 2023
14:00 BST
Scorecard

South East Stars; 176/6 (20 overs)	v	Central Sparks; 170 (19.3 overs)
Phoebe Franklin 52 (27); Georgia Davis 3/12 (4 overs)		Katie George 53 (34); Bryony Smith 3/23 (3.3 overs)

South East Stars won by 6 runs
St Lawrence Ground, Canterbury
Umpires: Fiona Richards and James Tredwell

- Central Sparks won the toss and elected to field.
- Points: South East Stars 4, Central Sparks 0

=== Tournament statistics ===
==== Batting ====
Player	Matches	Innings	Runs	Average	High score	100s	50s
Bryony Smith	7	7	256	36.57	83	0	2
Phoebe Franklin	7	7	196	32.66	53	0	2
Alice Capsey	3	3	107	35.66	71	0	1

Source: ESPN Cricinfo Qualification: 100 runs.

==== Bowling ====
Player	Matches	Overs	Wickets	Average	Economy	BBI	5wi
Danielle Gregory	7	15.0	7	15.14	7.06	2/14	0
Phoebe Franklin	7	21.5	7	22.71	7.28	2/18	0
Paige Scholfield	6	21.0	6	25.50	7.28	3/24	0
Bryony Smith	7	19.3	5	28.40	7.28	3/23	0

Source: ESPN Cricinfo Qualification: 5 wickets.

== Season statistics ==
=== Batting ===
Player	Rachael Heyhoe Flint Trophy								Charlotte Edwards Cup							
Player	Matches	Innings	Runs	High score	Average	Strike rate	100s	50s	Matches	Innings	Runs	High score	Average	Strike rate	100s	50s
Madeleine Blinkhorn-Jones	5	5	113	77	28.25	84.32	0	1	–	–	–	–	–	–	–	–
Tazmin Brits	4	3	214	112*	107.00	133.75	1	1	–	–	–	–	–	–	–	–
Alice Capsey	3	3	23	18	7.66	100.00	0	1	3	3	107	71	35.66	146.57	0	1
Darcey Carter	1	1	2	2	2.00	50.00	0	0	–	–	–	–	–	–	–	–
Kira Chathli	15	14	280	71	20.00	63.06	0	2	5	5	44	24	14.66	86.27	0	0
Priyanaz Chatterji	1	1	15	15*	–	68.18	0	0	–	–	–	–	–	–	–	–
Claudie Cooper	–	–	–	–	–	–	–	–	5	1	18	18	18.00	120.00	0	0
Aylish Cranstone	6	6	124	69	20.66	76.07	0	1	4	4	11	8	2.75	36.66	0	0
Alice Davidson-Richards	13	12	322	101	26.83	77.59	1	1	5	5	90	43	22.50	104.65	0	0
Freya Davies	7	5	36	15	12.00	37.11	0	0	5	2	8	8*	–	200.00	0	0
Sophia Dunkley	2	2	103	101*	103.00	93.63	1	0	3	3	85	53	28.33	116.43	0	1
Tash Farrant	4	4	90	45	22.50	72.58	0	0	7	7	64	32*	12.80	108.47	0	0
Phoebe Franklin	5	5	64	26	16.00	80.00	0	0	7	7	196	53	32.66	120.98	0	2
Danielle Gregory	15	10	35	20*	17.50	41.66	0	0	7	1	0	0*	–	0.00	0	0
Chloe Hill	6	6	138	63	23.00	67.64	0	1	2	2	29	25	14.50	107.40	0	0
Emma Jones	1	1	18	18	18.00	200.00	0	0	–	–	–	–	–	–	–	–
Ryana MacDonald-Gay	14	13	121	26	11.00	55.25	0	0	5	5	14	6*	7.00	70.00	0	0
Bethan Miles	7	5	86	33	17.20	66.15	0	0	–	–	–	–	–	–	–	–
Kalea Moore	7	6	36	17	7.20	37.89	0	0	4	3	15	10	7.50	88.23	0	0
Paige Scholfield	14	13	439	134*	39.90	96.06	2	1	6	6	48	31	8.00	106.66	0	0
Bryony Smith	14	13	291	97	22.38	101.39	0	2	7	7	256	83	36.57	155.15	0	2
Jemima Spence	9	7	80	29	11.42	42.32	0	0	–	–	–	–	–	–	–	–
Alexa Stonehouse	12	10	179	51	17.90	66.79	0	1	2	1	0	0	0.00	0.00	0	0
Source: ESPN Cricinfo

=== Bowling ===
Player	Rachael Heyhoe Flint Trophy							Charlotte Edwards Cup						
Player	Matches	Overs	Wickets	Average	Economy	BBI	5wi	Matches	Overs	Wickets	Average	Economy	BBI	5wi
Alice Capsey	3	8.5	6	6.00	4.07	6/28	1	3	–	–	–	–	–	–
Darcey Carter	1	5.0	2	15.50	6.20	2/31	0	–	–	–	–	–	–	–
Priyanaz Chatterji	1	5.0	0	–	5.80	–	0	–	–	–	–	–	–	–
Claudie Cooper	–	–	–	–	–	–	–	5	14.0	4	21.75	6.21	3/12	0
Alice Davidson-Richards	13	61.2	15	20.53	5.02	3/20	0	5	10.2	2	44.50	8.61	1/16	0
Freya Davies	7	47.0	11	18.81	4.40	3/27	0	5	15.5	4	30.75	7.76	2/14	0
Tash Farrant	4	12.0	1	45.00	3.75	1/32	0	7	–	–	–	–	–	–
Phoebe Franklin	5	22.0	4	23.25	4.22	3/18	0	7	21.5	7	22.71	7.28	2/18	0
Danielle Gregory	15	74.0	21	17.80	5.05	4/12	0	7	15.0	7	15.14	7.06	2/14	0
Emma Jones	1	3.0	0	–	5.33	–	0	–	–	–	–	–	–	–
Ryana MacDonald-Gay	14	67.0	15	23.60	5.28	3/27	0	5	13.0	3	35.00	8.07	1/8	0
Bethan Miles	7	27.0	3	38.66	4.29	2/26	0	–	–	–	–	–	–	–
Kalea Moore	7	25.5	0	–	5.38	–	0	4	4.0	0	–	11.25	–	0
Paige Scholfield	14	68.2	8	35.62	4.17	2/31	0	6	21.0	6	25.50	7.28	3/24	0
Bryony Smith	14	63.3	10	30.10	4.74	3/13	0	7	19.3	5	28.40	7.28	3/23	0
Alexa Stonehouse	12	55.0	9	28.66	4.69	2/31	0	2	3.0	0	–	7.00	–	0
Source: ESPN Cricinfo

=== Fielding ===
Player	Rachael Heyhoe Flint Trophy			Charlotte Edwards Cup		
Player	Matches	Innings	Catches	Matches	Innings	Catches
Madeleine Blinkhorn-Jones	5	5	2	–	–	–
Tazmin Brits	4	4	0	–	–	–
Alice Capsey	3	3	1	3	3	2
Darcey Carter	1	1	0	–	–	–
Priyanaz Chatterji	1	1	0	–	–	–
Claudie Cooper	–	–	–	5	5	1
Aylish Cranstone	6	6	3	4	4	3
Alice Davidson-Richards	13	13	6	5	5	2
Freya Davies	7	7	1	5	5	0
Sophia Dunkley	2	2	4	3	3	1
Tash Farrant	4	4	1	7	7	3
Phoebe Franklin	5	5	4	7	7	1
Danielle Gregory	15	15	2	7	7	1
Chloe Hill	6	6	0	2	1	0
Emma Jones	1	1	0	–	–	–
Ryana MacDonald-Gay	14	14	7	5	5	0
Bethan Miles	7	7	3	–	–	–
Kalea Moore	7	7	1	4	4	1
Paige Scholfield	14	14	9	6	6	0
Bryony Smith	14	14	7	7	6	2
Jemima Spence	9	9	1	–	–	–
Alexa Stonehouse	12	12	0	2	2	0
Source: ESPN Cricinfo

=== Wicket-keeping ===
Player	Rachael Heyhoe Flint Trophy				Charlotte Edwards Cup			
Player	Matches	Innings	Catches	Stumpings	Matches	Innings	Catches	Stumpings
Kira Chathli	15	15	16	1	5	5	2	2
Chloe Hill	6	–	–	–	2	1	0	0
Bryony Smith	14	–	–	–	7	1	2	1
Source: ESPN Cricinfo
