= 2021 South East Stars season =

South East Stars
2021 season
- Coach: Johann Myburgh
- Captain: Tash Farrant
- RHFT: 5th
- CEC: Champions
- Most runs: RHFT: Bryony Smith (252); CEC: Alice Capsey (203)
- Most wickets: RHFT: Bryony Smith (12); CEC: Bryony Smith (14)
- Most catches: RHFT: Alice Davidson-Richards (8); CEC: Alice Davidson-Richards (6)
- Most wicket-keeping dismissals: RHFT: Kira Chathli (3); CEC: Kira Chathli (4)

The 2021 season was South East Stars' second season, in which they competed in the 50 over Rachael Heyhoe Flint Trophy and the new Twenty20 competition, the Charlotte Edwards Cup. The side finished fifth in the group stage of the Rachael Heyhoe Flint Trophy, winning three of their seven matches.

In the Charlotte Edwards Cup, the side finished top of Group A, winning five of their six matches, therefore progressing directly to the final. There, they played Northern Diamonds, who made 138/4 batting first. In response, a 71-run opening partnership from Bryony Smith and Aylish Cranstone along with 40* from 26 balls from Player of the Match Alice Capsey ensured the side won by 5 wickets to become the inaugural winners of the tournament.

The side was captained by Tash Farrant, with Bryony Smith standing-in whilst Farrant was away with England. They were coached by the newly appointed Johann Myburgh. They played four home matches at the County Ground, Beckenham, as well as one apiece at The Oval, the St Lawrence Ground and Woodbridge Road, Guildford.

== Squad ==
South East Stars announced their initial 19-player squad on 24 May 2021. Alexa Stonehouse was promoted to the senior squad from the Academy on 25 June 2021. Ryana MacDonald-Gay was promoted to the senior squad from the Academy on 30 August 2021. Age given is at the start of South East Stars' first match of the season (29 May 2021).

Name	Nationality	Birth date	Batting Style	Bowling Style	Notes
Batters
Aylish Cranstone	England	28 August 1994 (aged 26)	Left-handed	Left-arm medium	
Phoebe Franklin	England	18 February 1998 (aged 23)	Right-handed	Right-arm medium	
Susie Rowe	England	14 April 1987 (aged 34)	Right-handed	Right-arm medium	
Kirstie White	England	14 March 1988 (aged 33)	Right-handed	Right-arm medium	
All-rounders
Chloe Brewer	England	12 July 2002 (aged 18)	Right-handed	Right-arm medium	
Alice Capsey	England	11 August 2004 (aged 16)	Right-handed	Right-arm off break	
Alice Davidson-Richards	England	29 May 1994 (aged 27)	Right-handed	Right-arm fast-medium	
Sophia Dunkley	England	16 July 1998 (aged 22)	Right-handed	Right-arm leg break	
Grace Gibbs	England	1 May 1995 (aged 26)	Right-handed	Right-arm medium	
Emma Jones	England	8 August 2002 (aged 18)	Right-handed	Right-arm medium	
Hannah Jones	England	21 July 1999 (aged 21)	Right-handed	Right-arm off break	
Ryana MacDonald-Gay	England	12 February 2004 (aged 17)	Right-handed	Right-arm medium	
Kalea Moore	England	27 March 2003 (aged 18)	Right-handed	Right-arm off break	
Bryony Smith	England	12 December 1997 (aged 23)	Right-handed	Right-arm off break	Vice-captain
Wicket-keepers
Kira Chathli	England	29 July 1999 (aged 21)	Right-handed	—	
Rhianna Southby	England	16 October 2000 (aged 20)	Right-handed	—	
Bowlers
Freya Davies	England	27 October 1995 (aged 25)	Right-handed	Right-arm fast-medium	
Tash Farrant	England	29 May 1996 (aged 25)	Left-handed	Left-arm medium	Captain
Eva Gray	England	24 May 2000 (aged 21)	Right-handed	Right-arm medium	
Danielle Gregory	England	4 December 1998 (aged 22)	Right-handed	Right-arm leg break	
Alexa Stonehouse	England	5 December 2004 (aged 16)	Right-handed	Left-arm medium	

== Rachael Heyhoe Flint Trophy ==
=== Season standings ===
Pos	Team	Pld	W	L	T	NR	BP	Pts	NRR
1	Southern Vipers (Q)	7	6	1	0	0	3	27	0.417
2	Northern Diamonds (Q)	7	5	2	0	0	3	23	1.182
3	Central Sparks (Q)	7	5	2	0	0	2	22	0.822
4	Lightning	7	3	4	0	0	1	13	0.274
5	South East Stars	7	3	4	0	0	1	13	−0.226
6	Western Storm	7	3	4	0	0	1	13	−0.462
7	North West Thunder	7	3	4	0	0	1	13	−0.620
8	Sunrisers	7	0	7	0	0	0	0	−1.598

Source: ESPN Cricinfo

Advanced to the final
Advanced to the play-off

=== Fixtures ===
29 May 2021
10:30 BST
Scorecard

South East Stars; 324/7 (50 overs)	v	Sunrisers; 189 (39.2 overs)
Sophia Dunkley 104* (93); Kelly Castle 3/40 (7.4 overs)		Naomi Dattani 47 (61); Tash Farrant 5/33 (8 overs)

South East Stars won by 135 runs
County Ground, Chelmsford
Umpires: Joanne Ibbotson and Sue Redfern

- Sunrisers won the toss and elected to field.
- Points: South East Stars 5, Sunrisers 0

31 May 2021
10:30 BST
Scorecard

South East Stars; 137 (39.5 overs)	v	Southern Vipers; 138/3 (28.4 overs)
Bryony Smith 41 (38); Charlotte Taylor 4/21 (8 overs)		Danni Wyatt 64* (88); Bryony Smith 2/25 (4 overs)

Southern Vipers won by 7 wickets
County Cricket Ground, Beckenham
Umpires: Rob White and Sarah Bartlett

- Southern Vipers won the toss and elected to field.
- Points: Southern Vipers 5, South East Stars 0

5 June 2021
10:30 BST
Scorecard

Western Storm; 245/8 (50 overs)	v	South East Stars; 249/4 (43.1 overs)
Heather Knight 73 (87); Tash Farrant 4/58 (10 overs)		Alice Davidson-Richards 92 (99); Nicole Harvey 2/43 (7 overs)

South East Stars won by 6 wickets
The Oval, London
Umpires: Sophie McLelland and Tom Lungley

- South East Stars won the toss and elected to field.
- Points: South East Stars 4, Western Storm 0

12 June 2021
10:30 BST
Scorecard

South East Stars; 250/6 (50 overs)	v	Northern Diamonds; 254/7 (49.2 overs)
Kirstie White 73 (90); Jenny Gunn 2/45 (9 overs)		Sterre Kalis 76 (106); Danielle Gregory 2/31 (10 overs)

Northern Diamonds won by 3 wickets
Headingley, Leeds
Umpires: Jasmine Naeem and Tom Lungley

- South East Stars won the toss and elected to bat.
- Points: Northern Diamonds 4, South East Stars 0

10 September 2021
10:30 BST
Scorecard

South East Stars; 293/9 (50 overs)	v	Lightning; 265 (49.2 overs)
Bryony Smith 84 (73); Yvonne Graves 3/43 (10 overs)		Kathryn Bryce 87 (115); Bryony Smith 3/46 (10 overs)

South East Stars won by 28 runs
County Cricket Ground, Beckenham
Umpires: Neil Mallender and Sophie McLelland

- South East Stars won the toss and elected to bat.
- Points: South East Stars 4, Lightning 0

12 September 2021
10:30 BST
Scorecard

Central Sparks; 229 (49.1 overs)	v	South East Stars; 114 (31.3 overs)
Davina Perrin 43 (59); Ryana MacDonald-Gay 2/31 (9 overs)		Alice Capsey 26 (33); Georgia Davis 4/26 (10 overs)

Central Sparks won by 115 runs
New Road, Worcester
Umpires: James Middlebrook and Lina Nenova

- Central Sparks won the toss and elected to bat.
- Points: Central Sparks 5, South East Stars 0

18 September 2021
10:30 BST
Scorecard

North West Thunder; 185 (47 overs)	v	South East Stars; 130 (35 overs)
Eleanor Threlkeld 70* (92); Danielle Gregory 2/23 (10 overs)		Kalea Moore 35 (59); Hannah Jones 5/33 (9 overs)

North West Thunder won by 55 runs
County Cricket Ground, Beckenham
Umpires: Sarah Bartlett and Mark Newell

- North West Thunder won the toss and elected to bat.
- Points: North West Thunder 5, South East Stars 0

=== Tournament statistics ===
==== Batting ====
Player	Matches	Innings	Runs	Average	High score	100s	50s
Bryony Smith	6	6	252	42.00	84	0	2
Sophia Dunkley	3	3	196	98.00	104*	1	1
Alice Davidson-Richards	7	7	196	24.14	92	0	2
Alice Capsey	7	7	142	20.28	78	0	1
Kirstie White	7	7	124	20.66	73	0	1
Aylish Cranstone	6	6	123	30.75	42*	0	0

Source: ESPN Cricinfo Qualification: 100 runs.

==== Bowling ====
Player	Matches	Overs	Wickets	Average	Economy	BBI	5wi
Bryony Smith	6	52.2	12	19.33	4.43	3/46	0
Tash Farrant	3	26.4	9	13.77	4.65	5/33	1
Danielle Gregory	7	52.0	6	35.66	4.11	2/23	0
Alice Capsey	7	34.0	5	32.20	4.73	2/32	0

Source: ESPN Cricinfo Qualification: 5 wickets.

== Charlotte Edwards Cup ==
=== Group A ===
Pos	Team	Pld	W	L	T	NR	BP	Pts	NRR
1	South East Stars (Q)	6	5	1	0	0	1	21	1.050
2	Southern Vipers (Q)	6	4	2	0	0	3	19	0.875
3	Central Sparks	6	3	3	0	0	0	12	−0.669
4	Lightning	6	0	6	0	0	0	0	−1.139

Source: ESPN Cricinfo
- Advanced to the final
- Advanced to the semi-final

=== Fixtures ===
26 June 2021
11:00 BST
Scorecard

Lightning; 107 (19.1 overs)	v	South East Stars; 108/4 (13.1 overs)
Bethany Harmer 34 (25); Bryony Smith 4/15 (3.1 overs)		Bryony Smith 30 (14); Kathryn Bryce 2/26 (3 overs)

South East Stars won by 6 wickets
Trent Bridge, Nottingham
Umpires: Billy Taylor and Jasmine Naeem

- Lightning won the toss and elected to bat.
- Points: South East Stars 5, Lightning 0

3 July 2021
14:30 BST
Scorecard

Central Sparks; 117 (19 overs)	v	South East Stars; 118/5 (16.2 overs)
Evelyn Jones 49 (44); Alice Capsey 3/13 (3 overs)		Grace Gibbs 33* (27); Georgia Davis 3/21 (4 overs)

South East Stars won by 5 wickets
St Lawrence Ground, Canterbury
Umpires: Sarah Bartlett and Tom Lungley

- South East Stars won the toss and elected to field.
- Points: South East Stars 4, Central Sparks 0

10 July 2021
14:30 BST
Scorecard

South East Stars; 127/7 (20 overs)	v	Southern Vipers; 130/3 (15.4 overs)
Kira Chathli 30 (20); Charlotte Taylor 3/12 (4 overs)		Maia Bouchier 53* (43); Bryony Smith 2/26 (3.4 overs)

Southern Vipers won by 7 wickets
County Cricket Ground, Beckenham
Umpires: Jasmine Naeem and Mark Newell

- Southern Vipers won the toss and elected to field.
- Points: Southern Vipers 5, South East Stars 0

25 August 2021
14:30 BST
Scorecard

South East Stars; 175/6 (20 overs)	v	Lightning; 147/7 (20 overs)
Alice Davidson-Richards 41* (25); Sonia Odedra 2/20 (4 overs)		Abigail Freeborn 61 (50); Bryony Smith 2/18 (4 overs)

South East Stars won by 28 runs
Woodbridge Road, Guildford
Umpires: Joanne Ibbotson and Billy Taylor

- Lightning won the toss and elected to field.
- Points: South East Stars 4, Lightning 0

28 August 2021
14:30 BST
Scorecard

South East Stars; 167/4 (20 overs)	v	Southern Vipers; 147/7 (20 overs)
Alice Capsey 61 (46); Georgia Adams 1/16 (2 overs)		Georgia Elwiss 45 (33); Alice Capsey 2/9 (2 overs)

South East Stars won by 20 runs
Rose Bowl, Southampton
Umpires: Sarah Bartlett and Anna Harris

- Southern Vipers won the toss and elected to field.
- Points: South East Stars 4, Southern Vipers 0

30 August 2021
12:00 BST
Scorecard

South East Stars; 165/6 (20 overs)	v	Central Sparks; 139/6 (20 overs)
Emma Jones 46* (27); Clare Boycott 3/22 (3 overs)		Evelyn Jones 76 (68); Danielle Gregory 3/16 (4 overs)

South East Stars won by 26 runs
Edgbaston Foundation Ground, Birmingham
Umpires: Anna Harris and Graham Lloyd

- Central Sparks won the toss and elected to field.
- Points: South East Stars 4, Central Sparks 0

==== Final ====
5 September 2021
16:00 BST
Scorecard

Northern Diamonds; 138/4 (20 overs)	v	South East Stars; 139/5 (18 overs)
Hollie Armitage 59* (48); Grace Gibbs 1/13 (2 overs)		Alice Capsey 40* (26); Katie Levick 2/19 (4 overs)

South East Stars won by 5 wickets
Rose Bowl, Southampton
Umpires: Sarah Bartlett and Sue Redfern
Player of the match: Alice Capsey (South East Stars)

- Northern Diamonds won the toss and elected to bat.

=== Tournament statistics ===
==== Batting ====
Player	Matches	Innings	Runs	Average	High score	100s	50s
Alice Capsey	6	6	203	40.60	61	0	1
Bryony Smith	7	7	162	23.14	42	0	0
Phoebe Franklin	6	6	112	22.40	30	0	0
Alice Davidson-Richards	6	6	78	19.50	41*	0	0
Aylish Cranstone	5	5	74	14.80	35	0	0
Kira Chathli	7	5	66	33.00	30	0	0
Grace Gibbs	5	5	58	14.50	33*	0	0
Emma Jones	7	2	52	–	46*	0	0

Source: ESPN Cricinfo Qualification: 50 runs.

==== Bowling ====
Player	Matches	Overs	Wickets	Average	Economy	BBI	5wi
Bryony Smith	7	25.5	14	9.85	5.34	4/15	0
Alice Capsey	6	18.0	7	15.00	5.83	3/13	0
Kalea Moore	7	21.0	6	21.16	6.04	2/20	0
Danielle Gregory	7	25.0	6	26.33	6.32	3/16	0

Source: ESPN Cricinfo Qualification: 5 wickets.

== Season statistics ==
=== Batting ===
Player	Rachael Heyhoe Flint Trophy								Charlotte Edwards Cup							
Player	Matches	Innings	Runs	High score	Average	Strike rate	100s	50s	Matches	Innings	Runs	High score	Average	Strike rate	100s	50s
Chloe Brewer	2	2	42	25	21.00	58.33	0	0	1	1	41	41	41.00	124.24	0	0
Alice Capsey	7	7	142	78	20.28	83.52	0	1	6	6	203	61	40.60	130.96	0	1
Kira Chathli	4	3	40	21	13.33	56.33	0	0	7	5	66	30	33.00	146.66	0	0
Aylish Cranstone	6	6	123	42*	30.75	78.84	0	0	5	5	74	35	14.80	108.82	0	0
Alice Davidson-Richards	7	7	169	92	24.14	66.79	0	2	6	6	78	41*	19.50	111.42	0	0
Freya Davies	4	1	7	7*	–	50.00	0	0	–	–	–	–	–	–	–	–
Sophia Dunkley	3	3	196	104*	98.00	95.14	1	1	–	–	–	–	–	–	–	–
Tash Farrant	3	2	15	12	7.50	46.87	0	0	1	1	35	35	35.00	194.44	0	0
Phoebe Franklin	4	4	60	28*	20.00	89.55	0	0	6	6	112	30	22.40	103.70	0	0
Grace Gibbs	6	5	73	31	14.60	76.04	0	0	5	5	58	33*	14.50	105.45	0	0
Danielle Gregory	7	4	2	1*	2.00	10.00	0	0	7	–	–	–	–	–	–	–
Emma Jones	3	3	33	20*	16.50	80.48	0	0	7	2	52	46*	–	152.94	0	0
Ryana MacDonald-Gay	2	2	0	0	0.00	0.00	0	0	1	–	–	–	–	–	–	–
Kalea Moore	3	3	85	39	28.33	75.22	0	0	7	1	3	3*	–	100.00	0	0
Susie Rowe	–	–	–	–	–	–	–	–	3	3	33	19	16.50	91.66	0	0
Bryony Smith	6	6	252	84	42.00	102.43	0	2	7	7	162	42	23.14	148.62	0	0
Rhianna Southby	3	2	10	6*	10.00	47.61	0	0	–	–	–	–	–	–	–	–
Alexa Stonehouse	–	–	–	–	–	–	–	–	5	1	1	1*	–	100.00	0	0
Kirstie White	7	7	124	73	20.66	61.08	0	1	3	2	30	29	30.00	93.75	0	0
Source: ESPN Cricinfo

=== Bowling ===
Player	Rachael Heyhoe Flint Trophy							Charlotte Edwards Cup						
Player	Matches	Overs	Wickets	Average	Economy	BBI	5wi	Matches	Overs	Wickets	Average	Economy	BBI	5wi
Alice Capsey	7	34.0	5	32.20	4.73	2/32	0	6	18.0	7	15.00	5.83	3/13	0
Alice Davidson-Richards	7	30.3	4	48.75	6.39	2/35	0	6	11.0	3	30.33	8.27	1/28	0
Freya Davies	4	33.2	3	51.00	4.59	1/23	0	–	–	–	–	–	–	–
Tash Farrant	3	26.4	9	13.77	4.65	5/33	1	1	4.0	2	12.50	6.25	2/25	0
Phoebe Franklin	4	21.0	4	20.75	3.95	2/20	0	6	1.0	0	–	6.00	–	0
Grace Gibbs	6	30.0	4	38.25	5.10	2/40	0	5	9.0	1	69.00	7.66	1/33	0
Danielle Gregory	7	52.0	6	35.66	4.11	2/23	0	7	25.0	6	26.33	6.32	3/16	0
Emma Jones	3	7.0	1	36.00	5.14	1/16	0	7	9.3	1	118.00	12.42	1/14	0
Ryana MacDonald-Gay	2	13.0	2	22.50	3.46	2/31	0	1	2.3	0	–	5.60	–	0
Kalea Moore	3	13.0	2	32.00	4.92	1/12	0	7	21.0	6	21.16	6.04	2/20	0
Bryony Smith	6	52.2	12	19.33	4.43	3/46	0	7	25.5	14	9.85	5.34	4/15	0
Alexa Stonehouse	–	–	–	–	–	–	–	5	7.0	2	29.00	8.28	1/13	0
Source: ESPN Cricinfo

=== Fielding ===
Player	Rachael Heyhoe Flint Trophy			Charlotte Edwards Cup		
Player	Matches	Innings	Catches	Matches	Innings	Catches
Chloe Brewer	2	2	2	1	1	0
Alice Capsey	7	7	1	6	6	2
Aylish Cranstone	6	6	2	5	5	2
Alice Davidson-Richards	7	7	8	6	6	6
Freya Davies	4	4	2	–	–	–
Sophia Dunkley	3	3	3	–	–	–
Tash Farrant	3	3	2	1	1	0
Phoebe Franklin	4	4	1	6	6	1
Grace Gibbs	6	6	0	5	5	2
Danielle Gregory	7	7	0	7	7	1
Emma Jones	3	3	0	7	7	4
Ryana MacDonald-Gay	2	2	0	1	1	1
Kalea Moore	3	3	2	7	7	0
Susie Rowe	–	–	–	3	3	1
Bryony Smith	6	6	4	7	7	2
Alexa Stonehouse	–	–	–	5	5	0
Kirstie White	7	7	0	3	3	1
Source: ESPN Cricinfo

=== Wicket-keeping ===
Player	Rachael Heyhoe Flint Trophy				Charlotte Edwards Cup			
Player	Matches	Innings	Catches	Stumpings	Matches	Innings	Catches	Stumpings
Kira Chathli	4	4	3	0	7	7	1	3
Rhianna Southby	3	3	0	0	–	–	–	–
Source: ESPN Cricinfo
