= Claudie Cooper =

English cricketer

Personal information
- Full name: Claudie Anna Rose Cooper
- Born: 1 May 2002 (age 24); Guildford, Surrey, England
- Batting: Right-handed
- Bowling: Right-arm off break
- Role: Bowler

Domestic team information
- Years: Team
- 2019–2024: Surrey
- 2022–2024: South East Stars
- 2023: Oval Invincibles
- 2025–present: Yorkshire

Career statistics
| Competition | WLA | WT20 |
|---|---|---|
| Matches | 3 | 30 |
| Runs scored | 5 | 82 |
| Batting average | 5.00 | 9.11 |
| 100s/50s | 0/0 | 0/0 |
| Top score | 5 | 18 |
| Balls bowled | 109 | 558 |
| Wickets | 4 | 29 |
| Bowling average | 13.00 | 17.37 |
| 5 wickets in innings | 0 | 0 |
| 10 wickets in match | 0 | 0 |
| Best bowling | 2/14 | 4/5 |
| Catches/stumpings | 0/– | 10/– |
- Source: CricketArchive, 18 October 2024

Claudie Anna Rose Cooper (born 1 May 2002) is an English cricketer who currently plays for Yorkshire. She plays as a right-arm off break bowler.

== Domestic career ==
Cooper made her county debut in 2019, for Surrey against Warwickshire in the Women's Twenty20 Cup. She went on to play four matches in the competition, taking four wickets including her Twenty20 best bowling figures, 3/22 taken against Wales. In 2020, she took three-wicket hauls in two Women's London Championship matches. In 2021, she took six wickets in the Twenty20 Cup and four wickets in the London Championship. She took four wickets in the 2022 Women's Twenty20 Cup, including taking 2/6 from two overs against Sussex. She took six wickets in the group stage of the 2023 Women's Twenty20 Cup, at an average of 11.00, including taking 3/12 from her four overs against Oxfordshire.

Cooper was named in the South East Stars Academy squad for the 2021 season. In a 100-ball match against Southern Vipers Academy, she took 3/5 from 20 balls. She was promoted to the first team squad ahead of the 2022 season, but did not play a match for the side that year. She was retained in the squad for the 2023 season, and made her debut for the side on 25 May 2023, against Sunrisers in the Charlotte Edwards Cup. She played five matches overall for the side that season, all in the Charlotte Edwards Cup, taking four wickets at an average of 21.75. She was also signed by Oval Invincibles for The Hundred, but did not play a match. In 2024 she took 15 wickets in what would be her final season for Surrey.

Cooper joined Yorkshire in 2025 and saw an instant increase in playing time. She took 34 wickets across all competitions, including a best of 3/22. Cooper was also part of the team that won the Metro Bank One Day Cup 2. In April 2026 it was announced she had signed a contract extension with Yorkshire through to the end of the 2027 season.

Cooper will also return to the Hundred in 2026, having been drafted by Sunrisers Leeds.
