= Madeleine Blinkhorn-Jones =

English cricketer (born 2003)

Personal information
- Full name: Madeleine Elisabeth Blinkhorn-Jones
- Born: 20 April 2003 (age 23); Kensington, Greater London, England
- Batting: Right-handed
- Role: Batter

Domestic team information
- Years: Team
- 2020–2024: Surrey
- 2022–2024: South East Stars
- 2025–present: Essex

Career statistics
Competition	WLA	WT20
Matches	9	19
Runs scored	133	173
Batting average	16.62	11.53
100s/50s	0/1	0/0
Top score	77	26*
Catches/stumpings	2/–	4/1
- Source: CricketArchive, 18 October 2024

Madeleine Elisabeth Blinkhorn-Jones (born 20 April 2003) is an English cricketer who currently plays for Essex. She plays as a right-handed batter.

== Domestic career ==
Blinkhorn-Jones first played for the Surrey senior side in 2020, against Kent in the Women's London Championship. She went on to play two matches for Surrey in the 2021 Women's Twenty20 Cup, without batting. She also appeared for Surrey in their victorious 2021 Women's London Championship campaign, and was the second-highest run-scorer across the competition, with 138 runs including a high score of 62. She played six matches for Surrey in the 2022 Women's Twenty20 Cup, scoring 52 runs. She played four matches in the 2023 Women's Twenty20 Cup, scoring 53 runs.

Blinkhorn-Jones was named in the South East Stars Academy squad in 2021. She was again named in the Academy squad in 2022. In August 2022, she scored 93 for South East Stars 2nd XI, against Central Sparks 2nd XI. She was named in a matchday squad for the first team for the first time on 8 September 2022, and made her debut for the side on 17 September 2022, in the Rachael Heyhoe Flint Trophy against Lightning. She played five matches for the side in 2023, all in the Rachael Heyhoe Flint Trophy, and made her maiden List A half-century, with 77 against Central Sparks. In 2024, she played two matches for the side.
