= Freya Davies =

English cricketer (born 1995

Personal information
- Full name: Freya Ruth Davies
- Born: 27 October 1995 (age 31); Chichester, West Sussex, England
- Batting: Right-handed
- Bowling: Right-arm fast-medium
- Role: Bowler

International information
- National side: England (2019–2023)
- ODI debut (cap 134): 14 December 2019 v Pakistan
- Last ODI: 9 December 2022 v West Indies
- T20I debut (cap 48): 24 March 2019 v Sri Lanka
- Last T20I: 1 July 2023 v Australia

Domestic team information
- Years: Team
- 2010–2025: Sussex
- 2016–2019: Western Storm
- 2020–2023: South East Stars
- 2021–2022: London Spirit
- 2023–2025: Welsh Fire
- 2024: Southern Vipers
- 2025: Hampshire Women cricket team

Career statistics
Competition	WODI	WT20I	WLA	WT20
Matches	9	26	61	145
Runs scored	13	1	265	195
Batting average	6.50	–	13.25	9.28
100s/50s	0/0	0/0	0/0	0/0
Top score	10*	1*	32	27*
Balls bowled	423	468	2,783	2,714
Wickets	10	23	69	127
Bowling average	31.10	23.21	24.66	23.11
5 wickets in innings	0	0	1	0
10 wickets in match	0	0	0	0
Best bowling	2/36	4/23	6/10	4/8
Catches/stumpings	4/–	6/–	16/–	23/–
- Source: CricketArchive, 18 October 2023

Freya Ruth Davies (born 27 October 1995) is an English former cricketer who played for Sussex, Southern Vipers, Welsh Fire, Hampshire and England as a right-arm fast-medium bowler. She made her Sussex debut in 2010 at the age of 14, and played her first match for England in 2019.

== Early life ==
Davies was born on 27 October 1995 in Chichester, West Sussex. When Davies was a young child, her father, and her older brother Jack, both played for the family's local cricket club, Chichester. At the age of 8, Davies decided to join in, and played her first hard-ball game with Jack's under-11 team. She was attracted to fast bowling, because "that seemed like the most fun"; at 10 and 11 she was tall for her age, which also helped. Eventually, she joined the Sussex junior ranks as an 11 year old.

Davies attended Chichester High School for Girls, Brighton College and the University of Exeter.

== Domestic career ==
In 2010, Davies made her county debut for Sussex, against Middlesex. She took her first wicket a day later in her third match, dismissing the then England captain Charlotte Edwards, thanks in part to a catch by Sarah Taylor that Davies later described as "unbelievable". Davies soon became a regular player in Sussex's side, and was part of their team in three title wins: the 2013 Women's County Championship and the 2012 and 2015 T20 Cups. In the 2019 Women's Twenty20 Cup, Davies was Sussex's leading wicket-taker, with 8 at an average of 14.62.

Davies played every game (36) for Western Storm in the Women's Cricket Super League from its inception in 2016 until its conclusion in 2019, helping her side to two titles, in 2017 and 2019. Davies was the leading wicket-taker in the 2019 competition, with 19 wickets, and the second highest wicket-taker across the four years of the competition, with 37.

In October 2019, Davies was named as one of the first two players signed for London Spirit in The Hundred. She played two matches in the 2020 Rachael Heyhoe Flint Trophy for the South East Stars, but failed to take a wicket. In April 2022, she was retained by the London Spirit for the 2022 season of The Hundred. In March 2023 Davies was bought by Welsh Fire in the Hundred auction. Welsh Fire finished third in the league stages of the competition, but were denied a place in the Final due to the semi-final being rained off when they were in a strong position. Davies was retained by Welsh Fire for the 2024 competition and finished as the fourth highest wicket taker (11 wickets), with the fourth best economy rate, despite bowling the majority of her deliveries in the powerplay and at the death. She finished as the highest placed England bowler in the PCA's Women's Hundred Bowlers' Standings, second only to Marizanne Kapp. Welsh Fire finished top of the league stage of the 2024 Hundred. They lost in the final to London Spirit with two balls left.

In December 2023, it was announced that Davies had joined Southern Vipers from South East Stars.

Davies announced her retirement from professional cricket in September 2025.

== International career ==
In February 2019, although uncapped at the time, Davies was one of twenty-one cricketers to be awarded a central contract by the England and Wales Cricket Board (ECB). Later the same month, she was named in the England squad for their tours to India and Sri Lanka. She made her Women's Twenty20 International cricket (WT20I) debut for England against Sri Lanka on 24 March 2019, and recorded figures of 2/28 from her four overs. She played all three T20Is on the tour, and returned an economy rate of just 4.58.

The following month, she made her Women's One Day International (WODI) debut for England, against Pakistan on 14 December 2019, and finished with figures of 0/19 from her seven overs. She also played two T20Is on the tour, taking three wickets at an average of 14.66.

Davies played two matches in the 2020 Australia women's Tri-Nation Series, and was in England's squad for the 2020 ICC Women's T20 World Cup, but did not play a match.

On 18 June 2020, Davies was named in a squad of 24 players to begin training ahead of international women's fixtures starting in England following the COVID-19 pandemic. She played one T20I in the subsequent series against the West Indies, taking 1/11 from one over in a rain-reduced 5-over match.

In 2021, Davies was named in the squad for England's tour of New Zealand. Davies played five matches on the tour, and was most successful in the T20 series, where she took her T20I best bowling figures of 4/23 in the second match and ended the series as the joint-leading wicket-taker. In June 2021, Davies was named in England's Test squad for their one-off match against India. However, she was later released from the squad, allowing her to play in the 2021 Rachael Heyhoe Flint Trophy ahead of England's one-day matches.

In December 2021, Davies was named in England's squad for their tour to Australia to contest the Women's Ashes. In February 2022, she was named in England's team for the 2022 Women's Cricket World Cup in New Zealand. In June 2022, Davies was named in England's Women's Test squad for their one-off match against South Africa. In July 2022, she was named in England's team for the cricket tournament at the 2022 Commonwealth Games in Birmingham, England.
