= Phoebe Franklin =

English cricketer (born 1998)

Personal information
- Full name: Phoebe Antonia Franklin
- Born: 18 February 1998 (age 28); Greenwich, Greater London, England
- Batting: Right-handed
- Bowling: Right-arm medium
- Role: All-rounder

Domestic team information
- Years: Team
- 2014–2024: Kent
- 2020–2024: South East Stars
- 2021–2022: Birmingham Phoenix
- 2023: Northern Superchargers
- 2024: Welsh Fire
- 2025–present: Surrey
- 2025–present: Oval Invincibles

Career statistics
| Competition | WLA | WT20 |
|---|---|---|
| Matches | 53 | 83 |
| Runs scored | 662 | 1,034 |
| Batting average | 16.55 | 17.82 |
| 100s/50s | 0/0 | 0/5 |
| Top score | 37 | 53 |
| Balls bowled | 1,180 | 598 |
| Wickets | 34 | 27 |
| Bowling average | 27.05 | 26.70 |
| 5 wickets in innings | 0 | 0 |
| 10 wickets in match | 0 | 0 |
| Best bowling | 3/18 | 3/14 |
| Catches/stumpings | 29/– | 21/– |
- Source: CricketArchive, 18 October 2024

Phoebe Antonia Franklin (born 18 February 1998) is an English cricketer who currently plays for Surrey and Oval Invincibles. She plays as a right-handed batter and right-arm medium bowler. She has previously played for Kent, South East Stars and Birmingham Phoenix.

== Early life ==
Franklin was born on 18 February 1998 in Greenwich.

== Domestic career ==
Franklin made her county debut in 2014, for Kent against Essex. She was part of the Kent team that won the Championship and Twenty20 Cup double in 2016, and won the Championship again in 2019. She played six matches in the 2021 Women's Twenty20 Cup as Kent won the South East Group, and scored her maiden county half-century, scoring 51 against Middlesex. In the 2022 Women's Twenty20 Cup, Franklin scored 155 runs, including 51 made against Surrey. She played one match for the side in the 2023 Women's Twenty20 Cup, scoring 53 from 32 deliveries against Oxfordshire.

In 2020, Franklin played for South East Stars in the Rachael Heyhoe Flint Trophy. She appeared in two matches, batting once and scoring 22 against Southern Vipers. In 2021, she made 112 runs in the Stars' successful Charlotte Edwards Cup campaign, as well as playing four times in the Rachael Heyhoe Flint Trophy. She also appeared three times for Birmingham Phoenix in The Hundred. She played eleven matches for South East Stars in 2022, across the Charlotte Edwards Cup and the Rachael Heyhoe Flint Trophy, scoring 147 runs. She also took eight wickets at an average of 21.25 in the Charlotte Edwards Cup. In The Hundred, Franklin made two appearances for Birmingham Phoenix, scoring 10 runs and taking one wicket. At the end of the 2022 season, it was announced that Franklin had signed her first professional contract with South East Stars.

In 2023, she played 12 matches for South East Stars, across the Rachael Heyhoe Flint Trophy and the Charlotte Edwards Cup, taking 11 wickets and scoring two half-centuries. She also signed for Northern Superchargers in The Hundred, but withdrew due to injury. In 2024, she played 26 matches for South East Stars, across the Rachael Heyhoe Flint Trophy and the Charlotte Edwards Cup, scoring 369 runs and taking 16 wickets.
