= Kira Chathli =

English cricketer (born 1999)

Personal information
- Full name: Kira Meghan Chathli
- Born: 29 July 1999 (age 27); Southwark, Greater London, England
- Batting: Right-handed
- Role: Wicket-keeper

Domestic team information
- Years: Team
- 2013–present: Surrey
- 2021–2024: South East Stars
- 2022–2023: Oval Invincibles
- 2024: Trent Rockets
- 2025: London Spirit

Career statistics
Competition	WLA	WT20
Matches	46	59
Runs scored	874	439
Batting average	21.31	16.25
100s/50s	0/7	0/0
Top score	86*	36
Catches/stumpings	31/2	16/9
- Source: CricketArchive, 18 October 2024

Kira Meghan Chathli (born 29 July 1999) is an English cricketer who currently plays for Surrey and MI London. She plays as a wicket-keeper and right-handed batter.

== Early life ==
Chathli was born on 29 July 1999 in Southwark, Greater London.

== Domestic career ==
Chathli made her county debut in 2013, for Surrey against Essex. She played irregularly for the side over the following seasons, most notably taking 3 catches and making 2 stumpings in 4 matches in the 2018 Women's Twenty20 Cup before becoming a regular in the team in 2019. In the 2019 Women's County Championship, she scored 107 runs at an average of 17.83, including her List A high score of 35, made against Kent. In 2020, Chathli top scored with 28* to guide her side to their first London Cup victory over Middlesex. Chathli helped Surrey win by four wickets with one ball to spare with a "calculated" innings, including two scoop shots for four in the penultimate over. In 2021, Chathli scored 104 runs at an average of 17.33, including her Twenty20 high score of 36, in the Twenty20 Cup. She played four matches for Surrey in the 2022 Women's Twenty20 Cup.

In 2021, Chathli was selected as part of the South East Stars squad for their upcoming season. She made her debut for the side on 12 June 2021, against Northern Diamonds. She went to play four matches in the Rachael Heyhoe Flint Trophy, as well as being ever-present as the side won the Charlotte Edwards Cup, taking four catches and making three stumpings across the season. She played every match for South East Stars in 2022, across the Charlotte Edwards Cup and the Rachael Heyhoe Flint Trophy, and scored her maiden List A half-century, scoring 61 against Sunrisers. She was also ever-present throughout the victorious The Hundred campaign of Oval Invincibles. At the end of the 2022 season, it was announced that Chathli had signed her first professional contract with South East Stars.

In 2023, she played 20 matches for South East Stars, across the Rachael Heyhoe Flint Trophy and the Charlotte Edwards Cup, scoring 280 runs in the Rachael Heyhoe Flint Trophy including two half-centuries. She also played three matches for Oval Invincibles in The Hundred. In 2024, she played six matches for South East Stars, all in the Rachael Heyhoe Flint Trophy, scoring 251 runs including three half-centuries, at an average of 50.20.
