= Alice Davidson-Richards =

English cricketer

Personal information
- Full name: Alice Natica Davidson-Richards
- Born: 29 May 1994 (age 32); Royal Tunbridge Wells, Kent, England
- Batting: Right-handed
- Bowling: Right-arm fast-medium
- Role: All-rounder

International information
- National side: England
- Only Test (cap 164): 27 June 2022 v South Africa
- ODI debut (cap 130): 6 April 2018 v India
- Last ODI: 14 September 2023 v Sri Lanka
- T20I debut (cap 42): 23 March 2018 v Australia
- Last T20I: 22 December 2022 v West Indies

Domestic team information
- Years: Team
- 2010–2024: Kent
- 2016–2019: Yorkshire Diamonds
- 2018/19: Otago Sparks
- 2020–2024: South East Stars
- 2021–present: Northern Superchargers
- 2025–present: Surrey

Career statistics
| Competition | WTest | WODI | WT20I | WLA |
|---|---|---|---|---|
| Matches | 1 | 6 | 8 | 103 |
| Runs scored | 107 | 65 | 46 | 1,682 |
| Batting average | 107.00 | 21.66 | 11.50 | 24.73 |
| 100s/50s | 1/0 | 0/1 | 0/0 | 1/13 |
| Top score | 107 | 50* | 24 | 101 |
| Balls bowled | 84 | 138 | 72 | 3,408 |
| Wickets | 1 | 6 | 4 | 96 |
| Bowling average | 43.00 | 19.50 | 22.50 | 24.54 |
| 5 wickets in innings | 0 | 0 | 0 | 0 |
| 10 wickets in match | 0 | 0 | 0 | 0 |
| Best bowling | 1/39 | 3/35 | 3/5 | 4/18 |
| Catches/stumpings | 0/– | 4/– | 2/– | 44/– |
- Source: CricketArchive, 18 October 2023

Alice Natica Davidson-Richards (born 29 May 1994) is an English cricketer who plays for Surrey and Northern Superchargers. A right-handed batter and right-arm pace bowler, she made her county debut for Kent in 2010. She made her debut for England in March 2018.

== Early life and education ==
Davidson-Richards was born on 29 May 1994 in Royal Tunbridge Wells, Kent. She attended Epsom College, Surrey, England, where, between 2007 and 2011, she played cricket alongside her future England teammate and fellow Test centurion Nat Sciver-Brunt. She later studied at the University of Leeds, and has worked as a personal trainer.

== Domestic career ==
Davidson-Richards made her Kent debut in 2010, in a match against Surrey in the 2010 Women's Twenty20 Cup. She scored 29 opening the batting alongside Charlotte Edwards, and then took four wickets as Kent completed an 80-run victory. Davidson-Richards went on to take 10 wickets in the tournament, ending it as the second-highest wicket-taker. She went on to become a regular for Kent in both formats, and was part of Kent's title-winning campaigns in the Women's County Championship in 2011, 2012, 2014, 2016 and 2019, and in the Women's Twenty20 Cup in 2011, 2013 and 2016.

In the Women's Cricket Super League, Davidson-Richards played in all four seasons for the Yorkshire Diamonds. She was more successful with the ball throughout the competition, and was her team's second highest wicket-taker in 2017 and 2018, and their joint highest in 2019. In 2020, Davidson-Richards played three matches for the South East Stars in the Rachael Heyhoe Flint Trophy, and scored 61 in a match against Sunrisers. She made her List A high score playing for the side in 2021, scoring 92 against Western Storm. She also played six matches in the side's victorious Charlotte Edwards Cup campaign. She played for Northern Superchargers in 2021 season of The Hundred, taking seven wickets and scoring 110 runs in seven matches. She was South East Stars' joint-leading wicket-taker in the 2022 Rachael Heyhoe Flint Trophy, as well as scoring two half-centuries. She was also Northern Superchargers' leading wicket-taker in The Hundred, with 7 wickets. She was South East Stars' second-highest run-scorer and joint-second leading wicket-taker in the 2023 Rachael Heyhoe Flint Trophy, and Northern Superchargers' joint-second leading wicket-taker in the 2023 season of The Hundred.

Davidson-Richards played for Otago in the 2018/19 season. She scored two half-centuries in both the Hallyburton Johnstone Shield and the Super Smash, as well as taking 8 wickets in the Shield.

== International career ==
In March 2018, Davidson-Richards was named in the England squad for their tri-series against India and Australia. She played all five matches in the tournament, scoring 28 runs in three innings and bowling four overs for no wicket. In the following ODI series against India, Davidson-Richards played one match, scoring 9 runs as England lost by 1 wicket.

In February 2019, Davidson-Richards was awarded a rookie contract by the England and Wales Cricket Board (ECB) for 2019 and in 2020 she was named in a squad of 24 players to begin training following the COVID-19 pandemic.

In December 2021, Davidson-Richards was named in England's A squad for their tour to Australia, with the matches being played alongside the Women's Ashes.

In June 2022, Davidson-Richards was named in England's Women's Test squad for their one-off match against South Africa. She made her Test debut on 27 June 2022, for England against South Africa, scoring a century in England's first innings.
