= Danielle Gregory =

English cricketer (born 1998)

Personal information
- Full name: Danielle Lucy Gregory
- Born: 4 December 1998 (age 27); Frimley, Surrey, England
- Batting: Right-handed
- Bowling: Right-arm leg break
- Role: Bowler

Domestic team information
- Years: Team
- 2018–present: Surrey
- 2020–2024: South East Stars
- 2021–2022: Oval Invincibles
- 2023: Southern Brave
- 2024–present: Manchester Originals

Career statistics
| Competition | WLA | WT20 |
|---|---|---|
| Matches | 54 | 69 |
| Runs scored | 88 | 34 |
| Batting average | 5.86 | 3.77 |
| 100s/50s | 0/0 | 0/0 |
| Top score | 20* | 12* |
| Balls bowled | 2,060 | 1,154 |
| Wickets | 50 | 57 |
| Bowling average | 31.86 | 22.05 |
| 5 wickets in innings | 0 | 0 |
| 10 wickets in match | 0 | 0 |
| Best bowling | 4/12 | 4/7 |
| Catches/stumpings | 5/– | 11/– |
- Source: CricketArchive, 18 October 2024

Danielle Lucy Gregory (born 4 December 1998) is an English cricketer who currently plays for Surrey and Manchester Originals. She plays as a right-arm leg break bowler. She has previously played for South East Stars, Oval Invincibles and Southern Brave.

== Early life ==
Gregory was born on 4 December 1998, in Frimley, Surrey.

== Domestic career ==
Gregory made her county debut in 2018, for Surrey against Worcestershire. She was Surrey's leading wicket-taker in her first Twenty20 Cup season, taking 7 wickets, with a best bowling of 4/7 against Kent. She was again Surrey's leading wicket-taker in the 2019 Women's Twenty20 Cup, taking 9 wickets at an average of 13.55. Gregory was also part of the Surrey side that won their first London Cup in 2020, putting in a "superb" spell of bowling to take 1/21. She took four wickets for the side in the 2021 Women's Twenty20 Cup. She took five wickets in the 2022 Women's Twenty20 Cup, at an average of 23.20.

In 2020, Gregory played for South East Stars in the Rachael Heyhoe Flint Trophy. She appeared in 2 matches, taking 5 wickets at an average of 14.80. Her best bowling came in her second match, when she took 3/44 against Southern Vipers. She was ever-present for the side in 2021, and helped the side to win the inaugural Charlotte Edwards Cup. She took 6 wickets at an average of 35.66 in the Rachael Heyhoe Flint Trophy and 6 wickets at an average of 26.33 in the Charlotte Edwards Cup. She also played six matches for Oval Invincibles in The Hundred, who went on to win the competition. At the end of the 2021 season, it was announced that Gregory had signed a professional contract with South East Stars. She played 13 matches for South East Stars in 2022, across the Charlotte Edwards Cup and the Rachael Heyhoe Flint Trophy, taking seven wickets. She was also again part of the Oval Invincibles squad for The Hundred, but did not play a match. Having joined the Southern Brave for 2023, she was on the winning side again in The Hundred and, again, did not play a match. Meanwhile, for South East Stars in 2023, she was the third-leading wicket-taker in the Rachael Heyhoe Flint Trophy, with 21 wickets at an average of 17.80, as well as taking 7 wickets at an average of 15.14 in the Charlotte Edwards Cup.

In June 2024, Gregory was selected by Manchester Originals in the Wildcard Draft for The Hundred 2024. In 2024, she played 28 matches for South East Stars, across the Rachael Heyhoe Flint Trophy and the Charlotte Edwards Cup, taking 25 wickets.
