= Sophia Dunkley =

England cricketer

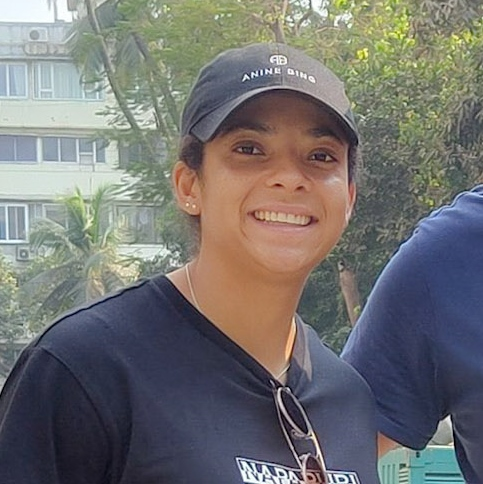
- Dunkley at Wankhede Stadium in 2023

Personal information
- Full name: Sophia Ivy Rose Dunkley
- Born: 16 July 1998 (age 28); Lambeth, London, England
- Batting: Right-handed
- Bowling: Right-arm leg break
- Role: Batter

International information
- National side: England (2018–present)
- Test debut (cap 161): 16 June 2021 v India
- Last Test: 30 January 2025 v Australia
- ODI debut (cap 135): 27 June 2021 v India
- Last ODI: 29 October 2025 v South Africa
- T20I debut (cap 45): 12 November 2018 v Bangladesh
- Last T20I: 12 July 2025 v India
- T20I shirt no.: 47

Domestic team information
- Years: Team
- 2012–2019: Middlesex
- 2016–2018: Surrey Stars
- 2019: Lancashire Thunder
- 2020–present: Surrey
- 2020–2024: South East Stars
- 2021–2022: Southern Brave
- 2022: Trailblazers
- 2023: Gujarat Giants
- 2023–2025: Welsh Fire
- 2023/24: Melbourne Stars
- 2025–2026: Sydney Sixers
- 2026: Trent Rockets

Career statistics
Competition	WTest	WODI	WT20I	WLA
Matches	6	48	79	107
Runs scored	228	1,049	1,400	2,912
Batting average	25.33	25.58	25.00	35.08
100s/50s	0/1	1/6	0/7	7/16
Top score	74*	107	81*	138
Balls bowled	18	17	24	1,919
Wickets	0	1	1	57
Bowling average	–	13.00	13.00	19.54
5 wickets in innings	0	0	0	0
10 wickets in match	0	0	0	0
Best bowling	–	1/1	1/6	4/7
Catches/stumpings	1/–	12/–	19/–	41/–
Medal record
Women's cricket
Representing England
T20 World Cup
Runner-up	2026 England
- Source: ESPNcricinfo, 5 November 2025

Sophia Ivy Rose Dunkley (born 16 July 1998) is an English cricketer who plays for Surrey, Trent Rockets and England. A right-handed batter and right-arm leg break bowler, she made her county debut in July 2012 for Middlesex, having turned 14 earlier in the month, and her England debut in 2018, against Bangladesh at the 2018 ICC Women's World Twenty20. In 2020, she left Middlesex to join Surrey. In June 2021, Dunkley was awarded her first central contract with the England women's cricket team. In the same month, she made her Test debut, becoming the first black woman to play Test cricket for England.

== Early life and education ==
Dunkley was born on 16 July 1998 in Lambeth, Greater London. She was raised in north London. As she explained to The Guardian in 2018, she was introduced to cricket by a neighbour:

"He was one of my best friends growing up. We used to live in a cul-de-sac so we were able to play outside. We both joined a club together, a boys' club, and it just stemmed from there."

Initially, she played at Finchley Cricket Club, where she made her way through the youth pathways. Then she joined Middlesex. She attended Mill Hill School, which awarded her with a sports scholarship. At Mill Hill, she played for the first XI with the boys, and was the first girl ever to do so. After leaving school, she studied sports science at Loughborough University.

== Domestic career ==
Dunkley made her debut for Middlesex in 2012 in a Twenty20 Cup match against Sussex, making two runs and bowling two overs for no wicket. She played regularly for Middlesex over the following seasons, as well as taking part in various England Development Programmes. Over time, Dunkley became one of Middlesex's strongest performers, winning the club's Player of the Year award in 2017 and 2019. She hit two centuries in the 2019 Women's County Championship, and ended the season as the tournament's leading run-scorer, with 451 runs. In February 2020, it was announced that she was leaving Middlesex to join Surrey.

Dunkley also played in every season of the Women's Cricket Super League, from 2016 to 2018 for Surrey Stars and in 2019 for Lancashire Thunder. Dunkley's best season for the Stars came in 2018, as she took 6 wickets at an average of 24.00 and scored 98 runs, including scoring 66 against Southern Vipers. Dunkley also took one wicket in the tournament final against Loughborough Lightning, as Surrey Stars claimed their first title.

Dunkley joined Lancashire Thunder for the 2019 season, but made little impact as the side finished bottom of the points table. In 2020, Dunkley played two games for the South East Stars in the Rachael Heyhoe Flint Trophy, and scored a "hard-hitting" 97 in her second match against Sunrisers to set up her side's first victory of the competition.

In 2021, she was drafted by Southern Brave for the inaugural season of The Hundred. In April 2022, she was bought by the Southern Brave for the 2022 season of The Hundred.

== International career ==
In October 2018, Dunkley was named in England's squad for their upcoming 2018 ICC Women's World Twenty20 campaign. She made her international debut in England's second game of the tournament, against Bangladesh, but did not bat or bowl. Dunkley played the rest of England's games in the tournament, as they progressed all the way to the final before losing to Australia. She top scored with 35 in England's loss to the West Indies, but otherwise had little opportunity to contribute with either bat or ball.

In February 2019, Dunkley was named as part of the squad for England's tours of India and Sri Lanka. She picked up her first international wicket in the 2nd Twenty20 against Sri Lanka, and overall played five matches on the tour.

After being omitted from England squads for the rest of 2019 and early 2020, on 18 June 2020 Dunkley was named in a squad of 24 players to begin training ahead of international women's fixtures starting in England following the COVID-19 pandemic. She subsequently played two T20Is against the West Indies, and was at the crease in the final T20 as England secured their 5–0 victory.

In February 2021, Dunkley was named in England's squad for their tour of New Zealand. She played all three T20Is on the tour, and scored 26 to help England reach a competitive total in the final match of the series. In June 2021, Dunkley was named in England's Test squad for their one-off match against India. Dunkley made her Test debut on 16 June 2021, for England against India. Later the same month, Dunkley was also named in England's Women's One Day International (WODI) squad, also for their series against India. Dunkley made her WODI debut for England, against India, on 27 June 2021. In the following match, she scored her first half-century in WODIs.

In December 2021, Dunkley was named in England's squad for their tour to Australia to contest the Women's Ashes. In February 2022, she was named in England's team for the 2022 Women's Cricket World Cup in New Zealand. In July 2022, in the second match against South Africa, Dunkley scored her first century in a WODI match, with 107 runs. Later the same month, she was named in England's team for the cricket tournament at the 2022 Commonwealth Games in Birmingham, England.

She was named in the England squad for the 2024 ICC Women's T20 World Cup.

Dunkley was named in England's squad for their multi-format tour to South Africa in November 2024.

She was named in the England squad for the 2025 Women's Ashes series in Australia.
