= Bryony Smith =

English cricketer

Personal information
- Full name: Bryony Frances Smith
- Born: 12 December 1997 (age 28); Sutton, Greater London, England
- Batting: Right-handed
- Bowling: Right-arm off break
- Role: All-rounder

International information
- National side: England
- Only ODI (cap 132): 13 June 2019 v West Indies
- T20I debut (cap 44): 23 March 2018 v Australia
- Last T20I: 15 September 2024 v Ireland

Domestic team information
- Years: Team
- 2014–present: Surrey
- 2016–2019: Surrey Stars
- 2020–2024: South East Stars
- 2021: Welsh Fire
- 2022–2025: Trent Rockets
- 2023/24: Hobart Hurricanes
- 2026–present: Sunrisers Leeds

Career statistics
Competition	WODI	WT20I	WLA	WT20
Matches	1	10	102	207
Runs scored	–	143	2,702	3,780
Batting average	–	17.88	29.69	19.58
100s/50s	–	0/1	4/15	1/16
Top score	–	58	119*	109*
Balls bowled	48	119	3,053	1,828
Wickets	1	2	82	86
Bowling average	20.00	30.00	25.12	23.80
5 wickets in innings	0	0	1	0
10 wickets in match	0	0	0	0
Best bowling	1/20	1/10	5/33	4/14
Catches/stumpings	0/–	2/–	34/–	51/1
- Source: CricketArchive, 28 July 2026

Bryony Frances Smith (born 12 December 1997) is an English cricketer who plays for Surrey, Sunrisers Leeds and Hobart Hurricanes. A right-handed batter who bowls off spin, she made her county debut for Surrey in 2014. She has played 10 T20Is and one ODI for England, making her debut in 2018.

== Early life ==
Smith was born on 12 December 1997 in Sutton, Greater London. She has worked as a secondary school teacher.

== Domestic career ==
Smith made her Surrey debut in 2014 in a County Championship match against Warwickshire, making 13 runs batting at 7. She made 60* in her second match, a victory against Yorkshire. Smith quickly became a regular in Surrey's side, with her best seasons coming in 2018 and 2019, in which she hit 256 runs at 42.66 and 347 runs at 57.83, respectively. In 2019, she was the third highest run-scorer in the whole tournament.

Smith played every season of the Women's Cricket Super League for the Surrey Stars, including their title winning season in 2018. In 2020, Smith played three games for the South East Stars in the Rachael Heyhoe Flint Trophy, and took 3/25 in a match against Sunrisers. In 2021, Smith took 14 wickets and scored 162 runs in the Charlotte Edwards Cup, making her the leading wicket-taker and sixth-highest run-scorer in the competition, as well as captaining the side through to winning the title. She also scored 252 runs and took 12 wickets in the 2021 Rachael Heyhoe Flint Trophy, placing her eighth on both the leading run-scorer and leading wicket-taker lists. She was also ever-present for Welsh Fire in The Hundred, scoring 137 runs and taking 4 wickets.

In April 2022, she was signed by the Trent Rockets for the 2022 season of The Hundred. She scored 118 runs for the side with a top score of 63, as well as being the side's leading wicket-taker, with 9 wickets at an average of 13.88. She was also South East Stars' leading run-scorer in the 2022 Rachael Heyhoe Flint Trophy, scoring 226 with a top score of 114. She was Stars' leading run-scorer in the 2023 Charlotte Edwards Cup, with 256 runs at an average of 36.57. She played for Hobart Hurricanes in the 2023–24 Women's Big Bash League season, scoring 90 runs in 13 matches.

== International career ==
In March 2018, Smith was named in the England squad for the upcoming tri-series against India and Australia. She played three matches in the tournament, scoring 16 runs in total.

In February 2019, she was awarded a rookie contract by the England and Wales Cricket Board (ECB) for 2019. In June 2019, she was added to England's squad for the third Women's One Day International (WODI) against the West Indies, and made her WODI debut in that match. She did not bat, but took her maiden international wicket, dismissing Natasha McLean.

On 18 June 2020, Smith was named in a squad of 24 players to begin training ahead of international women's fixtures starting in England following the COVID-19 pandemic, but did not play a match that summer. In December 2021, Smith was named in England's A squad for their tour to Australia, with the matches being played alongside the Women's Ashes.

In July 2022, she was named in England's squad for their T20I series against South Africa and for the cricket tournament at the 2022 Commonwealth Games in Birmingham, England.
