= South East Stars =

English women's cricket team

Team information
- Colours: Yellow and blue
- Established: 2020
- Home ground: County Cricket Ground, Beckenham; The Oval; St Lawrence Ground

History
- RHFT wins: 0
- CEC wins: 1
- Official website: South East Stars
Playing kit

South East Stars were a women's cricket team that represented the London & South East region, one of eight regional hubs in English domestic women's cricket. They played their home matches at various grounds, including the County Cricket Ground, Beckenham. They were captained by Bryony Smith and coached by Johann Myburgh. The team carried over many elements of the WCSL team Surrey Stars, but were partnered with both Surrey and Kent. The team won the inaugural Charlotte Edwards Cup, beating Northern Diamonds in the final.

At the end of the 2024 season, following reforms to the structure of women's domestic cricket, the team was effectively replaced by a professionalised Surrey team.

== History ==
In 2020, women's cricket in England was restructured, creating eight new 'regional hub' teams, with the intention of playing both 50-over and 20-over cricket. South East Stars were one of the sides created under this structure, effectively replacing the Women's Cricket Super League team Surrey Stars and representing the London & South East region, partnering with Surrey and Kent. The side was to be captained by Tash Farrant and coached by Jonathan Batty. Due to the COVID-19 pandemic, the 2020 season was truncated, and only 50-over cricket was played, in the Rachael Heyhoe Flint Trophy. South East Stars finished third in the South Group of the competition, winning two of their six matches. At the end of the season, five Stars players were given full-time domestic contracts, the first of their kind in England: Tash Farrant, Alice Davidson-Richards, Sophia Dunkley, Bryony Smith and Aylish Cranstone.

The following season, 2021, South East Stars competed in both the Rachael Heyhoe Flint Trophy and the newly formed Twenty20 competition, the Charlotte Edwards Cup. Johann Myburgh was named as the new Head Coach of the side. In the Rachael Heyhoe Flint Trophy, the side finished fifth in the group of eight, winning three of their seven matches, including scoring the highest team score of the tournament in the opening match, 324/7 against Sunrisers. In the Charlotte Edwards Cup, the Stars topped Group A of the tournament, winning five of their six matches to progress directly to the final. In the final, they played against Northern Diamonds. Chasing 139 to win, South East Stars won by 5 wickets with 2 overs to spare, with Alice Capsey top scoring with 40*. Bryony Smith, who captained the side throughout most of the tournament whilst Tash Farrant was on international duty, ended the tournament as the leading wicket-taker, with 14 wickets. Smith became the permanent captain of the side ahead of the 2022 season. The team qualified for the semi-final of the Charlotte Edwards Cup that season after topping Group A with five wins from six matches, but lost by 2 wickets to Central Sparks. They finished second in the group stage of the Rachael Heyhoe Flint Trophy, qualifying for the play-off. In the play-off, they lost to Southern Vipers by 6 wickets.

In 2023, they finished fifth in the Charlotte Edwards Cup, winning three of their seven matches. They finished third in the group stage of the Rachael Heyhoe Flint Trophy, therefore qualifying for the play-off. However, they lost in the play-off to The Blaze by 8 wickets (DLS). In 2024, the side were runners-up in both competitions. In the Charlotte Edwards Cup, they finished second in the group stage before beating Southern Vipers in the semi-finals and losing to The Blaze in the final. In the Rachael Heyhoe Flint Trophy, they again finished second in the group, and again defeated Southern Vipers in the semi-finals. They lost to Sunrisers in the final. Stars batter Alice Davidson-Richards was the leading run-scorer in the tournament, with 650 runs.

2024 was the side's final season, with reforms to the structure of domestic cricket in England meaning that the side was effectively replaced by a professionalised Surrey team.

== Home grounds ==
Venue	Games hosted by season					
Venue	20	21	22	23	24	Total
County Ground, Beckenham	2	4	5	7	10	28
The Oval	1	1	–	1	2	5
St Lawrence Ground	–	1	–	1	1	3
Woodbridge Road, Guildford	–	1	2	2	–	5

== Players ==
=== Overseas players ===
- Lauren Smith – Australia (2022)
- Tazmin Brits – South Africa (2023)
- Georgia Redmayne – Australia (2024)

== Seasons ==
=== Rachael Heyhoe Flint Trophy ===
Season	Final standing	League standings									Notes
Season	Final standing	P	W	L	T	NR	BP	Pts	NRR	Pos	Notes
2020	Group stage	6	2	4	0	0	2	10	−0.197	3rd	DNQ
2021	Group stage	7	3	4	0	0	1	13	−0.226	5th	DNQ
2022	Losing semi-finalists: 3rd	7	5	1	0	1	4	26	+0.687	2nd	Lost to Southern Vipers in the semi-final
2023	Losing semi-finalists: 3rd	14	7	6	0	1	6	36	+0.583	3rd	Lost to The Blaze in the semi-final
2024	Runners-up	14	9	5	0	0	4	40	+0.246	2nd	Lost to Sunrisers in the final

=== Charlotte Edwards Cup ===
Season	Final standing	League standings									Notes
Season	Final standing	P	W	L	T	NR	BP	Pts	NRR	Pos	Notes
2021	Champions	6	5	1	0	0	1	21	+1.050	1st	Won against Northern Diamonds in the final
2022	Losing semi-finalists: 3rd	6	5	1	0	0	1	21	+0.660	1st	Lost to Central Sparks in the semi-final
2023	Group stage	7	3	4	0	0	0	12	–0.096	5th	DNQ
2024	Runners-up	10	7	2	0	1	4	34	+0.309	2nd	Lost to The Blaze in the final

== Statistics ==
=== Rachael Heyhoe Flint Trophy ===
Rachael Heyhoe Flint Trophy – summary of results
Year	Played	Wins	Losses	Tied	NR	Win %
2020	6	2	4	0	0	33.33
2021	7	3	4	0	0	42.86
2022	8	5	2	0	1	62.50
2023	15	7	7	0	1	46.67
2024	16	10	6	0	0	62.50
Total	52	27	23	0	2	51.92

- Abandoned matches are counted as NR (no result)
- Win or loss by super over or boundary count are counted as tied.

Rachael Heyhoe Flint Trophy – teamwise result summary
Opposition	Mat	Won	Lost	Tied	NR	Win %
Central Sparks	6	4	2	0	0	66.67
Northern Diamonds	6	1	4	0	1	16.67
North West Thunder	6	3	3	0	0	50.00
Southern Vipers	10	2	8	0	0	20.00
Sunrisers	9	8	1	0	0	88.89
The Blaze	7	5	2	0	0	71.43
Western Storm	8	4	3	0	1	50.00

=== Charlotte Edwards Cup ===
Charlotte Edwards Cup - summary of results
Year	Played	Wins	Losses	Tied	NR	Win %
2021	7	6	1	0	0	85.71
2022	7	5	2	0	0	71.43
2023	7	3	4	0	0	42.86
2024	12	8	3	0	1	66.67
Total	33	22	10	0	1	66.67

- Abandoned matches are counted as NR (no result)
- Win or loss by super over or boundary count are counted as tied.

Charlotte Edwards Cup - teamwise result summary
Opposition	Mat	Won	Lost	Tied	NR	Win %
Central Sparks	7	4	3	0	0	57.14
Northern Diamonds	3	2	1	0	0	66.67
North West Thunder	2	1	1	0	0	50.00
Southern Vipers	6	3	3	0	0	50.00
Sunrisers	5	5	0	0	0	100.00
The Blaze	5	3	2	0	0	60.00
Western Storm	5	4	0	0	1	80.00

== Records ==
=== Rachael Heyhoe Flint Trophy ===
- Highest team total: 334/5, v North West Thunder on 22 April 2023.
- Lowest (completed) team total: 98 v Southern Vipers on 5 September 2020.
- Highest individual score: 134*, Paige Scholfield v Western Storm on 1 May 2023.
- Best individual bowling analysis: 6/28, Alice Capsey v Western Storm on 1 May 2023.
- Most runs: 1,354 runs in 42 matches, Alice Davidson-Richards.
- Most wickets: 48 wickets in 47 matches, Danielle Gregory.

=== Charlotte Edwards Cup ===
- Highest team total: 183/9, v Sunrisers on 5 June 2022.
- Lowest (completed) team total: 66, v Southern Vipers on 19 June 2024.
- Highest individual score: 83, Bryony Smith v Southern Vipers on 23 May 2023.
- Best individual bowling analysis: 5/19, Matilda Corteen-Coleman v Northern Diamonds on 31 May 2024.
- Most runs: 773 runs in 33 matches, Bryony Smith.
- Most wickets: 34 wickets in 33 matches, Bryony Smith.

== Honours ==
- Charlotte Edwards Cup:
  - Champions (1) – 2021

== See also ==
- Kent Women cricket team
- Surrey Women cricket team
- Surrey Stars
