= 2023 Western Storm season =

English cricket season

Western Storm
2023 season
- Coach: Trevor Griffin
- Captain: Sophie Luff
- Overseas player: (Ireland) Orla Prendergast (Australia) Piepa Cleary
- RHFT: 8th
- CEC: 6th
- Most runs: RHFT: Fran Wilson (404); CEC: Fran Wilson (186)
- Most wickets: RHFT: Chloe Skelton (14); CEC: Danielle Gibson (8)
- Most catches: RHFT: Fran Wilson (7); CEC: Danielle Gibson (4) & Sophia Smale (4)
- Most wicket-keeping dismissals: RHFT: Nat Wraith (7); CEC: Nat Wraith (3)

The 2023 season saw Western Storm compete in the 50 over Rachael Heyhoe Flint Trophy and the Twenty20 Charlotte Edwards Cup. In the Charlotte Edwards Cup, the side won three of their seven matches, finishing sixth in the group. In the Rachael Heyhoe Flint Trophy, the side finished bottom of the group, winning two of their fourteen matches.

The side was captained by Sophie Luff and coached by Trevor Griffin. They played four home matches at the County Ground, Taunton, three at the County Ground, Bristol, two at Sophia Gardens, and one apiece at College Ground, Cheltenham and Millfield School.

== Squad ==
=== Departures ===
On 3 November 2022, it was announced that Katie George had left the side, signing for Central Sparks. On 4 November 2022, it was announced that Fi Morris had left the side, joining North West Thunder. On 7 November 2022, it was announced that Georgia Hennessy had left the side to pursue opportunities outside cricket. Ahead of the 2023 season, it was confirmed that Lauren Parfitt, Bethan Gammon and Emily Geach had left the side.

=== Arrivals ===
Ahead of the 2023 season, the side's squad for the season was announced, confirming that Isobel Patel, Rebecca Odgers and Isla Thomson had been added to the squad. On 27 April 2023, the side announced the signing of Orla Prendergast as an overseas player for the months of May and June. On 2 July 2023, it was announced that the side had signed Piepa Cleary as an overseas player, for three Rachael Heyhoe Flint Trophy matches. In July 2023, the side signed Phoebe Graham on loan from North West Thunder for four Rachael Heyhoe Flint Trophy matches. On 4 September 2023, the side announced the signing of Gemma Lane on a pay-as-you-play contract.

=== Personnel and contract changes ===
On 7 November 2022, it was announced that Fran Wilson, Chloe Skelton, Sophia Smale and Lauren Filer had signed their first professional contracts with the side. On 13 March 2023, it was announced that Niamh Holland had signed her first professional contract with the side. On 20 April 2023, it was announced that Emma Corney had signed her first professional contract with the side.

=== Squad list ===
- Age given is at the start of Western Storm's first match of the season (22 April 2023).

Name	Nationality	Birth date	Batting Style	Bowling Style	Notes
Batters
Sophie Luff	England	6 December 1993 (aged 29)	Right-handed	Right-arm medium	Captain
Rebecca Odgers	England	10 February 2003 (aged 20)	Right-handed	Right-arm off break	
Fran Wilson	England	7 November 1991 (aged 31)	Right-handed	Right-arm off break	
All-rounders
Emma Corney	England	15 September 2003 (aged 19)	Right-handed	Right-arm medium	
Danielle Gibson	England	30 April 2001 (aged 21)	Right-handed	Right-arm medium	
Alex Griffiths	Wales	12 June 2002 (aged 20)	Right-handed	Right-arm medium	
Niamh Holland	England	27 October 2004 (aged 18)	Right-handed	Right-arm medium	
Heather Knight	England	26 December 1990 (aged 32)	Right-handed	Right-arm off break	
Isobel Patel	England	21 November 2004 (aged 18)	Right-handed	Right-arm medium	
Orla Prendergast	Ireland	1 June 2002 (aged 20)	Right-handed	Right-arm medium	Overseas player; May to June 2023
Chloe Skelton	England	20 June 2001 (aged 21)	Right-handed	Right-arm off break	
Isla Thomson	England	24 July 2004 (aged 18)	Right-handed	Left-arm medium	
Wicket-keepers
Katie Jones	England	28 December 2005 (aged 17)	Right-handed	—	
Nat Wraith	England	3 October 2001 (aged 21)	Right-handed	—	
Bowlers
Piepa Cleary	Australia	17 July 1996 (aged 26)	Right-handed	Right-arm medium	Overseas player; July 2023
Lauren Filer	England	22 December 2000 (aged 22)	Right-handed	Right-arm medium	
Phoebe Graham	England	23 October 1991 (aged 31)	Right-handed	Right-arm medium	Four match loan from North West Thunder in July 2023
Nicole Harvey	England	18 September 1992 (aged 30)	Right-handed	Right-arm leg break	
Gemma Lane	England	13 May 2003 (aged 19)	Right-handed	Right-arm medium	Joined September 2023
Claire Nicholas	Wales	8 September 1986 (aged 36)	Right-handed	Right-arm off break	
Mollie Robbins	England	4 October 1998 (aged 24)	Right-handed	Right-arm medium	
Sophia Smale	Wales	8 December 2004 (aged 18)	Right-handed	Slow left-arm orthodox	

== Rachael Heyhoe Flint Trophy ==
=== Season standings ===
Pos	Team	Pld	W	L	T	NR	BP	Pts	NRR
1	Southern Vipers (Q)	14	7	4	1	2	4	38	0.457
2	The Blaze (Q)	14	7	4	0	3	4	38	0.173
3	South East Stars (Q)	14	7	6	0	1	6	36	0.583
4	Sunrisers	14	6	5	0	3	2	32	−0.006
5	Central Sparks	14	6	5	1	2	1	31	−0.233
6	Northern Diamonds	14	6	7	0	1	4	30	−0.034
7	North West Thunder	14	3	5	2	4	2	26	−0.274
8	Western Storm	14	2	8	0	4	0	16	−1.068

Source: England and Wales Cricket Board

advanced to the final advanced to the play-off

=== Fixtures ===
22 April 2023
10:30
Scorecard

Northern Diamonds; 290/8 (36 overs)	v	Western Storm; 185 (33.3 overs)
Lauren Winfield-Hill 75 (79); Alex Griffiths 2/40 (7 overs)		Fran Wilson 43 (43); Katie Levick 4/36 (8 overs)

Northern Diamonds won by 105 runs
Headingley Cricket Ground, Leeds
Umpires: Paul Pollard and Rose Dovey

- Western Storm won the toss and elected to field.
- Match reduced to 36 overs per side due to rain.
- Points: Northern Diamonds 5, Western Storm 0

29 April 2023
10:30
Scorecard

North West Thunder; 214 (44.4 overs)	v	Western Storm; 215/4 (41.3 overs)
Emma Lamb 74 (85); Chloe Skelton 3/36 (8 overs)		Orla Prendergast 115 (115); Mahika Gaur 3/39 (10 overs)

Western Storm won by 6 wickets
Sophia Gardens, Cardiff
Umpires: Paul Baldwin and Anna Harris

- North West Thunder won the toss and elected to bat.
- Points: Western Storm 4, North West Thunder 0

1 May 2023
10:30
Scorecard

South East Stars; 296/7 (50 overs)	v	Western Storm; 89 (30.5 overs)
Paige Scholfield 134* (109); Danielle Gibson 3/42 (8 overs)		Alex Griffiths 21 (62); Alice Capsey 6/28 (7.5 overs)

South East Stars won by 207 runs
County Ground, Bristol
Umpires: Anthony Harris and Sophie McLelland

- South East Stars won the toss and elected to bat.
- Points: South East Stars 5, Western Storm 0

6 May 2023
10:30
Scorecard

Southern Vipers	v	Western Storm

Match abandoned
County Ground, Hove

- No toss.
- No play was possible due to rain.
- Points: Southern Vipers 2, Western Storm 2

10 May 2023
10:30
Scorecard

The Blaze; 209/9 (50 overs)	v	Western Storm; 23/0 (5 overs)
Nadine de Klerk 43 (62); Chloe Skelton 2/23 (7 overs)		Alex Griffiths 14* (25)

No result
Grace Road, Leicester
Umpires: Anna Harris and Billy Taylor

- Western Storm won the toss and elected to field.
- No further play was possible due to rain.
- Points: The Blaze 2, Western Storm 2

2 July 2023
10:30
Scorecard

The Blaze; 245 (49.5 overs)	v	Western Storm; 239/7 (50 overs)
Marie Kelly 54 (74); Nicole Harvey 3/32 (10 overs)		Alex Griffiths 67 (118); Teresa Graves 2/28 (6 overs)

The Blaze won by 6 runs
County Ground, Bristol
Umpires: Hassan Adnan and Rose Dovey

- Western Storm won the toss and elected to field.
- Points: The Blaze 4, Western Storm 0

11 July 2023
10:30
Scorecard

Western Storm	v	Central Sparks

No result
Scorers, Shirley
Umpires: Joanne Ibbotson and Naeem Ashraf

- Central Sparks won the toss and elected to field.
- No play was possible due to rain.
- Points: Central Sparks 2, Western Storm 2

15 July 2023
10:30
Scorecard

Western Storm; 230/5 (48 overs)	v	Southern Vipers; 240/6 (43.4 overs)
Emma Corney 69 (100); Linsey Smith 2/36 (10 overs)		Maia Bouchier 71 (72); Alex Griffiths 2/35 (5.4 overs)

Southern Vipers won by 4 wickets (DLS method)
Millfield School, Street
Umpires: Ben Peverall and Sophie McLelland

- Southern Vipers won the toss and elected to field.
- Match reduced to 48 overs per side due to rain; Southern Vipers target was 238.
- Points: Southern Vipers 4, Western Storm 0

22 July 2023
10:30
Scorecard

Western Storm; 182/4 (36 overs)	v	South East Stars
Emma Corney 48 (76); Alice Davidson-Richards 2/27 (5 overs)

No result
County Ground, Beckenham
Umpires: James Tredwell and Julia Jarvis

- South East Stars won the toss and elected to field.
- No further play was possible due to rain.
- Points: South East Stars 2, Western Storm 2

24 July 2023
10:30
Scorecard

Western Storm; 165/3 (22 overs)	v	Sunrisers; 159/8 (22 overs)
Fran Wilson 56 (52); Amuruthaa Surenkumar 2/37 (5 overs)		Grace Scrivens 39 (45); Sophia Smale 4/34 (4 overs)

Western Storm won by 6 runs
College Ground, Cheltenham
Umpires: Anthony Harris and Joanne Ibbotson

- Sunrisers won the toss and elected to field.
- Match reduced to 22 overs per side due to rain.
- Points: Western Storm 4, Sunrisers 0

5 September 2023
10:30
Scorecard

Western Storm; 143 (45.1 overs)	v	Sunrisers; 144/6 (33.5 overs)
Emma Corney 34 (82); Jodi Grewcock 3/24 (7.1 overs)		Mady Villiers 29 (24); Mollie Robbins 2/23 (6 overs)

Sunrisers won by 4 wickets
Brunton Memorial Ground, Radlett
Umpires: Gabi Brown and Nigel Llong

- Western Storm won the toss and elected to bat.
- Points: Sunrisers 5, Western Storm 0

10 September 2023
10:30
Scorecard

Northern Diamonds; 281/3 (43 overs)	v	Western Storm; 250/7 (43 overs)
Lauren Winfield-Hill 83 (92); Mollie Robbins 2/41 (9 overs)		Sophie Luff 87 (105); Lizzie Scott 2/30 (7 overs)

Northern Diamonds won by 31 runs
County Ground, Taunton
Umpires: Rose Dovey and Simon Widdup

- Western Storm won the toss and elected to field.
- Match reduced to 43 overs per side due to rain.
- Points: Northern Diamonds 4, Western Storm 0

13 September 2023
10:30
Scorecard

Western Storm; 241/8 (50 overs)	v	Central Sparks; 242/3 (44.1 overs)
Nat Wraith 39 (48); Georgia Davis 2/32 (10 overs)		Evelyn Jones 84* (113); Sophia Smale 2/38 (10 overs)

Central Sparks won by 7 wickets
County Ground, Taunton
Umpires: Gabi Brown and Ian Blackwell

- Central Sparks won the toss and elected to field.
- Points: Central Sparks 4, Western Storm 0

16 September 2023
10:30
Scorecard

Western Storm; 250/7 (50 overs)	v	North West Thunder; 254/5 (46.4 overs)
Sophia Smale 56 (82); Olivia Bell 3/30 (10 overs)		Eleanor Threlkeld 107* (115); Sophia Smale 2/21 (10 overs)

North West Thunder won by 5 wickets
Old Trafford Cricket Ground, Manchester
Umpires: Ben Peverall and Grace Bambury

- Western Storm won the toss and elected to bat.
- Points: North West Thunder 5, Western Storm 0

=== Tournament statistics ===
==== Batting ====
Player	Matches	Innings	Runs	Average	High score	100s	50s
Fran Wilson	13	11	404	40.40	74*	0	3
Emma Corney	12	10	296	29.60	69	0	2
Sophie Luff	10	9	254	36.28	87	0	2
Alex Griffiths	12	11	203	20.30	67	0	1

Source: ESPN Cricinfo Qualification: 200 runs.

==== Bowling ====
Player	Matches	Overs	Wickets	Average	Economy	BBI	5wi
Chloe Skelton	12	88.0	14	31.28	4.97	3/36	0
Sophia Smale	12	78.5	12	28.66	4.36	4/34	0
Alex Griffiths	12	61.1	11	31.45	5.65	2/25	0

Source: ESPN Cricinfo Qualification: 10 wickets.

== Charlotte Edwards Cup ==
=== Season standings ===
Pos	Team	Pld	W	L	T	NR	BP	Pts	NRR
1	The Blaze (Q)	7	7	0	0	0	4	32	1.765
2	Southern Vipers (Q)	7	5	2	0	0	2	22	0.940
3	North West Thunder (Q)	7	4	3	0	0	2	18	0.331
4	Northern Diamonds	7	4	3	0	0	1	17	−0.129
5	South East Stars	7	3	4	0	0	0	12	−0.096
6	Western Storm	7	3	4	0	0	0	12	−0.512
7	Central Sparks	7	2	5	0	0	0	8	−0.558
8	Sunrisers	7	0	7	0	0	0	0	−1.717

Source: England and Wales Cricket Board

advanced to final advanced to the semi-final

=== Fixtures ===
19 May 2023
18:30 BST (D/N)
Scorecard

Northern Diamonds; 218/3 (20 overs)	v	Western Storm; 186/8 (20 overs)
Lauren Winfield-Hill 98 (56); Orla Prendergast 1/32 (4 overs)		Danielle Gibson 52 (30); Katie Levick 2/25 (3 overs)

Northern Diamonds won by 32 runs
Headingley Cricket Ground, Leeds
Umpires: Grace Bambury and Hassan Adnan

- Western Storm won the toss and elected to field.
- Points: Northern Diamonds 4, Western Storm 0

21 May 2023
14:30 BST
Scorecard

North West Thunder; 154/7 (20 overs)	v	Western Storm; 155/4 (19.2 overs)
Emma Lamb 36 (22); Orla Prendergast 2/36 (4 overs)		Heather Knight 62 (41); Sophie Ecclestone 2/29 (4 overs)

Western Storm won by 6 wickets
County Ground, Taunton
Umpires: Ben Peverall and Sophie McLelland

- North West Thunder won the toss and elected to bat.
- Points: Western Storm 4, North West Thunder 0

26 May 2023
15:00 BST
Scorecard

Western Storm; 105/8 (20 overs)	v	Southern Vipers; 107/3 (14.1 overs)
Sophie Luff 44 (46); Lauren Bell 3/19 (4 overs)		Maia Bouchier 45 (41); Lauren Filer 1/12 (3 overs)

Southern Vipers won by 7 wickets
Rose Bowl, Southampton
Umpires: Paul Nicholls and Ben Peverall

- Western Storm won the toss and elected to bat.
- Points: Southern Vipers 5, Western Storm 0

28 May 2023
14:30 BST
Scorecard

South East Stars; 126/6 (20 overs)	v	Western Storm; 121 (19.5 overs)
Alice Davidson-Richards 43 (45); Orla Prendergast 2/12 (4 overs)		Sophie Luff 43* (46); Freya Davies 2/14 (3.5 overs)

South East Stars won by 5 runs
County Ground, Taunton
Umpires: Rose Dovey and Ben Peverall

- Western Storm won the toss and elected to field.
- Points: South East Stars 4, Western Storm 0

31 May 2023
14:30 BST
Scorecard

Sunrisers; 149/6 (20 overs)	v	Western Storm; 150/3 (18.2 overs)
Jo Gardner 37* (29); Chloe Skelton 2/19 (4 overs)		Danielle Gibson 62 (46); Mady Villiers 1/20 (4 over)

Western Storm won by 7 wickets
County Ground, Northampton
Umpires: Anthony Harris and Sue Redfern

- Western Storm won the toss and elected to field.
- Points: Western Storm 4, Sunrisers 0

4 June 2023
10:30 BST
Scorecard

Central Sparks; 135/6 (20 overs)	v	Western Storm; 137/3 (19.2 overs)
Erin Burns 66 (45); Danielle Gibson 4/23 (4 overs)		Orla Prendergast 46* (43); Hannah Baker 1/21 (4 overs)

Western Storm won by 7 wickets
County Ground, Bristol
Umpires: Rose Dovery and Sophie McLelland

- Central Sparks won the toss and elected to bat.
- Points: Western Storm 4, Central Sparks 0

7 June 2023
14:30 BST
Scorecard

Western Storm; 134/7 (20 overs)	v	The Blaze; 137/3 (18.4 overs)
Emma Corney 23 (32); Kathryn Bryce 2/17 (4 overs)		Kathryn Bryce 54* (37); Claire Nicholas 2/24 (4 overs)

The Blaze won by 7 wickets
Sophia Gardens, Cardiff
Umpires: Anna Harris and Ben Peverall

- The Blaze won the toss and elected to field.
- Points: The Blaze 4, Western Storm 0

=== Tournament statistics ===
==== Batting ====
Player	Matches	Innings	Runs	Average	High score	100s	50s
Fran Wilson	7	7	186	31.00	58*	0	2
Danielle Gibson	6	6	166	27.66	62	0	2
Sophie Luff	7	7	150	50.00	44	0	0
Orla Prendergast	7	7	117	23.40	46*	0	0

Source: ESPN Cricinfo Qualification: 100 runs.

==== Bowling ====
Player	Matches	Overs	Wickets	Average	Economy	BBI	5wi
Danielle Gibson	6	23.0	8	21.25	7.39	4/23	0
Orla Prendergast	7	24.4	6	30.16	7.33	2/12	0
Lauren Filer	5	16.0	5	24.80	7.75	1/12	0
Chloe Skelton	7	23.0	5	33.40	7.26	2/19	0

Source: ESPN Cricinfo Qualification: 5 wickets.

== Season statistics ==
=== Batting ===
Player	Rachael Heyhoe Flint Trophy								Charlotte Edwards Cup							
Player	Matches	Innings	Runs	High score	Average	Strike rate	100s	50s	Matches	Innings	Runs	High score	Average	Strike rate	100s	50s
Piepa Cleary	3	2	28	14*	–	90.32	0	0	–	–	–	–	–	–	–	–
Emma Corney	12	10	296	69	29.60	59.91	0	2	1	1	23	23	23.00	71.87	0	0
Lauren Filer	6	2	9	6	4.50	60.00	0	0	5	3	34	21	17.00	87.17	0	0
Danielle Gibson	6	5	74	35	14.80	129.82	0	0	6	6	166	62	27.66	141.88	0	2
Phoebe Graham	4	–	–	–	–	–	–	–	–	–	–	–	–	–	–	–
Alex Griffiths	12	11	203	67	20.30	54.13	0	1	7	4	55	31	18.33	107.84	0	0
Nicole Harvey	5	2	26	25	26.00	65.00	0	0	–	–	–	–	–	–	–	–
Niamh Holland	12	10	100	44	12.50	90.90	0	0	7	4	48	21	12.00	117.07	0	0
Katie Jones	6	2	48	32	24.00	96.00	0	0	1	1	4	4*	–	80.00	0	0
Heather Knight	1	1	5	5*	–	100.00	0	0	3	3	74	62	24.66	139.62	0	1
Gemma Lane	4	1	5	5*	–	45.45	0	0	–	–	–	–	–	–	–	–
Sophie Luff	10	9	254	87	36.28	71.54	0	2	7	7	150	44	50.00	93.75	0	0
Claire Nicholas	2	1	0	0	0.00	0.00	0	0	3	–	–	–	–	–	–	–
Rebecca Odgers	–	–	–	–	–	–	–	–	1	–	–	–	–	–	–	–
Isobel Patel	1	1	1	1*	–	33.33	0	0	–	–	–	–	–	–	–	–
Orla Prendergast	3	2	131	115	65.50	89.11	1	0	7	7	117	46*	23.40	109.34	0	0
Mollie Robbins	7	3	12	10	12.00	32.43	0	0	1	1	1	1*	–	50.00	0	0
Chloe Skelton	13	6	72	26*	36.00	56.69	0	0	7	1	5	5	5.00	100.00	0	0
Sophia Smale	12	8	132	56	18.85	59.72	0	1	7	4	16	10	8.00	114.28	0	0
Isla Thomson	1	1	16	16*	–	84.21	0	1	–	–	–	–	–	–	–	–
Fran Wilson	13	11	404	74*	40.40	90.58	0	3	7	7	186	58*	31.00	121.56	0	2
Nat Wraith	10	8	187	61	26.71	93.03	0	1	7	7	43	16	6.14	91.48	0	0
Source: ESPN Cricinfo

=== Bowling ===
Player	Rachael Heyhoe Flint Trophy							Charlotte Edwards Cup						
Player	Matches	Overs	Wickets	Average	Economy	BBI	5wi	Matches	Overs	Wickets	Average	Economy	BBI	5wi
Piepa Cleary	3	19.0	5	17.60	4.63	3/43	0	–	–	–	–	–	–	–
Emma Corney	12	3.0	0	–	8.66	–	0	–	–	–	–	–	–	–
Lauren Filer	6	37.0	8	30.25	6.54	3/60	0	5	16.0	5	24.80	7.75	1/12	0
Danielle Gibson	6	38.0	8	21.12	4.44	3/42	0	6	23.0	8	21.25	7.39	4/23	0
Phoebe Graham	4	11.0	1	55.00	5.00	1/45	0	–	–	–	–	–	–	–
Alex Griffiths	12	61.1	11	31.45	5.65	2/25	0	7	10.0	2	44.00	8.80	1/12	0
Nicole Harvey	5	25.0	3	38.00	4.56	3/32	0	–	–	–	–	–	–	–
Niamh Holland	12	20.4	2	93.00	9.00	2/53	0	7	1.0	0	–	23.00	–	0
Heather Knight	1	–	–	–	–	–	–	3	3.0	0	–	6.66	–	0
Gemma Lane	4	13.1	0	–	7.67	–	0	–	–	–	–	–	–	–
Claire Nicholas	2	7.0	0	–	7.14	–	0	3	10.0	3	19.66	5.90	2/24	0
Isobel Patel	1	5.0	0	–	9.60	–	0	–	–	–	–	–	–	–
Orla Prendergast	3	10.0	0	–	6.40	–	0	7	24.4	6	30.16	7.33	2/12	0
Mollie Robbins	7	46.0	6	39.83	5.19	2/23	0	1	1.0	0	–	6.00	–	0
Chloe Skelton	13	88.0	14	31.28	4.97	3/36	0	7	23.0	5	33.40	7.26	2/19	0
Sophia Smale	12	78.5	12	28.66	4.36	4/34	0	7	21.1	3	53.66	7.60	1/16	0
Isla Thomson	1	1.0	0	–	19.00	–	0	–	–	–	–	–	–	–
Source: ESPN Cricinfo

=== Fielding ===
Player	Rachael Heyhoe Flint Trophy			Charlotte Edwards Cup		
Player	Matches	Innings	Catches	Matches	Innings	Catches
Piepa Cleary	3	2	2	–	–	–
Emma Corney	12	10	0	1	1	0
Lauren Filer	6	5	1	5	5	0
Danielle Gibson	6	5	2	6	6	4
Phoebe Graham	4	2	0	–	–	–
Alex Griffiths	12	10	3	7	7	0
Nicole Harvey	5	4	1	–	–	–
Niamh Holland	12	10	2	7	7	0
Katie Jones	6	1	0	1	1	0
Heather Knight	1	1	1	3	3	0
Gemma Lane	4	4	0	–	–	–
Sophie Luff	10	8	1	7	7	3
Claire Nicholas	2	2	0	3	3	0
Rebecca Odgers	–	–	–	1	1	0
Isobel Patel	1	1	0	–	–	–
Orla Prendergast	3	3	1	7	7	3
Mollie Robbins	7	6	2	1	1	0
Chloe Skelton	13	11	2	7	7	3
Sophia Smale	12	11	6	7	7	4
Isla Thomson	1	1	0	–	–	–
Fran Wilson	13	11	7	7	7	3
Nat Wraith	10	2	0	7	0	0
Source: ESPN Cricinfo

=== Wicket-keeping ===
Player	Rachael Heyhoe Flint Trophy				Charlotte Edwards Cup			
Player	Matches	Innings	Catches	Stumpings	Matches	Innings	Catches	Stumpings
Katie Jones	6	4	1	2	1	–	–	–
Nat Wraith	10	7	6	1	7	7	1	2
Source: ESPN Cricinfo
