= List of Western Storm cricketers =

This is an alphabetical list of cricketers who played for Western Storm during their existence between 2016 and 2024. They first played in the Women's Cricket Super League, a Twenty20 competition, that ran from 2016 to 2019. After a restructure of English women's domestic cricket in 2020, they competed in the 50 over Rachael Heyhoe Flint Trophy and, from 2021, the Twenty20 Charlotte Edwards Cup. At the end of the 2024 season, Western Storm were effectively replaced by a professionalised Somerset team.

Players' names are followed by the years in which they were active as a Western Storm player. Seasons given are first and last seasons; the player did not necessarily play in all the intervening seasons. This list only includes players who appeared in at least one match for Western Storm; players who were named in the team's squad for a season but did not play a match are not included.

== A ==
- Ellie Anderson (2024)

== C ==
- Piepa Cleary (2023)
- Emma Corney (2020–2024)

== D ==
- Naomi Dattani (2018–2019)
- Freya Davies (2016–2019)
- Jodie Dibble (2016–2017)

== E ==
- Emily Edgcombe (2020–2021)

== F ==
- Lauren Filer (2020–2024)

== G ==
- Bethan Gammon (2021)
- Emily Geach (2022)
- Katie George (2020–2022)
- Danielle Gibson (2018–2024)
- Phoebe Graham (2023)
- Alex Griffiths (2019–2024)

== H ==
- Nicole Harvey (2021–2023)
- Jess Hazell (2024)
- Georgia Hennessy (2016–2022)
- Niamh Holland (2020–2024)
- Holly Huddleston (2017)
- Steph Hutchins (2020–2021)

== J ==
- Katie Jones (2023–2024)

== K ==
- Heather Knight (2016–2024)

== L ==
- Gemma Lane (2023)
- Lizelle Lee (2016)
- Sophie Luff (2016–2024)

== M ==
- Alice Macleod (2017–2018)
- Smriti Mandhana (2018–2019)
- Fi Morris (2020–2022)

== N ==
- Claire Nicholas (2017–2023)

== O ==
- Sonia Odedra (2019)
- Rebecca Odgers (2023)
- Caitlin O'Keefe (2016)

== P ==
- Lauren Parfitt (2020–2022)
- Isobel Patel (2023)
- Orla Prendergast (2023)
- Rachel Priest (2016–2019)

== R ==
- Mollie Robbins (2021–2024)
- Joleigh Roberts (2021)

== S ==
- Deepti Sharma (2019)
- Anya Shrubsole (2016–2021)
- Chloe Skelton (2021–2024)
- Sophia Smale (2022–2024)

== T ==
- Stafanie Taylor (2016–2018)
- Isla Thomson (2023)

== W ==
- Amanda-Jade Wellington (2024)
- Fran Wilson (2016–2024)
- Issy Wong (2024)
- Nat Wraith (2020–2024)

== Captains ==
No.	Name	Nationality	Years	First	Last	LA	T20	Total
1	Heather Knight	England	2016–2019	31 July 2016	1 September 2019	0	36	36
2	Sophie Luff	England	2020–2024	29 August 2020	7 September 2024	43	27	70
3	Danielle Gibson	England	2023	29 April 2023	10 May 2023	3	0	3
