= 2024 Western Storm season =

English cricket season

Western Storm
2024 season
- Coach: Trevor Griffin
- Captain: Sophie Luff
- Overseas player: (Australia) Amanda-Jade Wellington
- RHFT: 8th
- CEC: 7th
- Most runs: RHFT: Fran Wilson (500); CEC: Heather Knight (155)
- Most wickets: RHFT: Chloe Skelton (17); CEC: Amanda-Jade Wellington (12)
- Most catches: RHFT: Sophie Luff (5), Sophia Smale (5) & Fran Wilson (5); CEC: Sophia Smale (5)
- Most wicket-keeping dismissals: RHFT: Katie Jones (6) & Nat Wraith (6); CEC: Nat Wraith (7)

The 2024 season saw Western Storm compete in the 50 over Rachael Heyhoe Flint Trophy and the Twenty20 Charlotte Edwards Cup. In the Charlotte Edwards Cup, the side won two of their ten matches, finishing seventh in the group. In the Rachael Heyhoe Flint Trophy, the side finished bottom of the group, winning four of their fourteen matches.

The side was captained by Sophie Luff and coached by Trevor Griffin. They played five home matches at the County Ground, Taunton, three at the County Ground, Bristol, and two apiece at Sophia Gardens and College Ground, Cheltenham.

This was Western Storm's final season in existence, effectively being replaced by a professionalised Somerset team under the England and Wales Cricket Board's changes to the structure of women's domestic cricket from 2025 onwards.

== Squad ==
=== Departures ===
On 17 April 2024, it was announced that Isobel Patel, Rebecca Odgers, Isla Thomson and Nicole Harvey had not been retained in the squad compared to the previous season.

=== Arrivals ===
On 28 March 2024, it was announced that the side had signed Amanda-Jade Wellington as an overseas player for the entire season. On 17 April 2024, it was announced that Lola Harris, Emily Geach and Imogen Cooper had been added to the squad. On 30 April 2024, it was announced that the side had signed Ellie Anderson on a month-long loan from Central Sparks. On 1 May 2024, Jess Hazell was added to the squad. On 12 June 2024, Anderson's loan was extended until 23 July 2024, and then again on 23 August 2024 until the end of the season. On 24 May 2024, it was announced that the side had signed Issy Wong on loan from Central Sparks for the duration of the Charlotte Edwards Cup. Wong's loan was later extended on 27 June 2024 until the end of July, and then again on 23 August 2024 for one match on 26 August 2024.

=== Personnel and contract changes ===
On 3 October 2023, it was announced that Mollie Robbins had signed her first professional contract with the side.

=== Squad list ===
- Age given is at the start of Western Storm's first match of the season (20 April 2024).

Name	Nationality	Birth date	Batting Style	Bowling Style	Notes
Batters
Emma Corney	England	15 September 2003 (aged 20)	Right-handed	Right-arm medium	
Sophie Luff	England	6 December 1993 (aged 30)	Right-handed	Right-arm medium	Captain
Fran Wilson	England	7 November 1991 (aged 32)	Right-handed	Right-arm off break	
All-rounders
Danielle Gibson	England	30 April 2001 (aged 22)	Right-handed	Right-arm medium	
Alex Griffiths	Wales	12 June 2002 (aged 21)	Right-handed	Right-arm medium	
Niamh Holland	England	27 October 2004 (aged 19)	Right-handed	Right-arm medium	
Heather Knight	England	26 December 1990 (aged 33)	Right-handed	Right-arm off break	
Sophia Smale	Wales	8 December 2004 (aged 19)	Right-handed	Slow left-arm orthodox	
Wicket-keepers
Jess Hazell	England	22 August 2004 (aged 19)	Right-handed	—	Joined May 2024
Katie Jones	England	28 December 2005 (aged 18)	Right-handed	—	
Nat Wraith	England	3 October 2001 (aged 22)	Right-handed	—	
Bowlers
Ellie Anderson	England	30 October 2003 (aged 20)	Right-handed	Right-arm medium	On loan from Central Sparks, May to September 2024
Imogen Cooper	England	25 October 2001 (aged 22)	Right-handed	Right-arm medium	
Lauren Filer	England	22 December 2000 (aged 23)	Right-handed	Right-arm medium	
Emily Geach	England	15 February 2004 (aged 20)	Left-handed	Right-arm medium	
Lola Harris	England	20 October 2006 (aged 17)	Right-handed	Right-arm leg break	
Gemma Lane	England	13 May 2003 (aged 20)	Right-handed	Right-arm medium	
Claire Nicholas	Wales	8 September 1986 (aged 37)	Right-handed	Right-arm off break	
Mollie Robbins	England	4 October 1998 (aged 25)	Right-handed	Right-arm medium	
Chloe Skelton	England	20 June 2001 (aged 22)	Right-handed	Right-arm off break	
Amanda-Jade Wellington	Australia	29 May 1997 (aged 26)	Right-handed	Right-arm leg break	Overseas player
Issy Wong	England	15 May 2002 (aged 21)	Right-handed	Right-arm medium	On loan from Central Sparks, May to August 2024

== Rachael Heyhoe Flint Trophy ==
=== Season standings ===
Pos	Team	Pld	W	L	T	NR	BP	Pts	NRR
1	Northern Diamonds (Q)	14	9	4	0	1	3	41	0.097
2	South East Stars (Q)	14	9	5	0	0	4	40	0.246
3	Southern Vipers (Q)	14	7	6	0	1	4	34	0.534
4	Sunrisers (Q)	14	7	6	0	1	4	34	−0.122
5	The Blaze	14	7	6	0	1	1	31	−0.176
6	North West Thunder	14	5	8	0	1	3	25	−0.013
7	Central Sparks	14	5	8	0	1	3	25	−0.299
8	Western Storm	14	4	10	0	0	2	18	−0.211

Source: ESPNCricinfo

advanced to the Semi-finals

=== Fixtures ===
20 April 2024
10:30
Scorecard

Western Storm; 114 (30.4 overs)	v	Sunrisers; 116/2 (33.4 overs)
Nat Wraith 42 (52); Nicola Hancock 3/15 (5.4 overs)		Grace Scrivens 63* (98); Amanda-Jade Wellington 1/24 (9 overs)

Sunrisers won by 8 wickets
Sophia Gardens, Cardiff
Umpires: Anna Harris and Ian Blackwell

- Sunrisers won the toss and elected to bowl.
- Points: Sunrisers 5, Western Storm 0

24 April 2024
10:30
Scorecard

Northern Diamonds; 275/9 (50 overs)	v	Western Storm; 265 (49.2 overs)
Hollie Armitage 103 (114); Amanda-Jade Wellington 3/30 (10 overs)		Sophia Smale 35 (49); Abigail Glen 3/42 (8.2 overs)

Northern Diamonds won by 10 runs
Headingley Cricket Ground, Leeds
Umpires: Chris Watts and Gabi Brown

- Western Storm won the toss and elected to bowl.
- Points: Northern Diamonds 4, Western Storm 0

27 April 2024
10:30
Scorecard

Western Storm; 252/6 (50 overs)	v	North West Thunder; 186 (42.4 overs)
Sophie Luff 76* (100); Sophie Ecclestone 3/16 (10 overs)		Emma Lamb 38 (53); Chloe Skelton 3/35 (8 overs)

Western Storm won by 66 runs
Old Trafford Cricket Ground, Manchester
Umpires: Grace Bambury and Paul Baldwin

- North West Thunder won the toss and elected to bowl.
- Points: Western Storm 5, North West Thunder 0

1 May 2024
10:30
Scorecard

South East Stars; 298/5 (44 overs)	v	Western Storm; 236/5 (36 overs)
Paige Scholfield 74 (68); Niamh Holland 2/59 (7 overs)		Fran Wilson 65 (61); Bethan Miles 2/47 (5 overs)

Western Storm won by 8 runs (DLS)
County Ground, Taunton
Umpires: Anthony Harris and Gabi Brown

- Western Storm won the toss and elected to bowl.
- Match reduced to 44 overs per side due to rain.
- Western Storm innings curtailed at 36 overs due to rain; target was 229.
- Points: Western Storm 4, South East Stars 0

4 May 2024
10:30
Scorecard

Southern Vipers; 295/5 (50 overs)	v	Western Storm; 291/9 (50 overs)
Charli Knott 102 (112); Sophia Smale 2/49 (9 overs)		Heather Knight 62 (59); Freya Davies 2/51 (10 overs)

Southern Vipers won by 4 runs
County Ground, Bristol
Umpires: Fiona Richards and Sue Redfern

- Western Storm won the toss and elected to bowl.
- Points: Southern Vipers 4, Western Storm 0

8 May 2024
10:30
Scorecard

Western Storm; 275 (48.1 overs)	v	The Blaze; 276/6 (48 overs)
Nat Wraith 73 (54); Kirstie Gordon 4/40 (10 overs)		Nadine de Klerk 106* (113); Sophia Smale 2/47 (9 overs)

The Blaze won by 4 wickets
Trent Bridge, Nottingham
Umpires: Anthony Harris and Jasmine Naeem

- The Blaze won the toss and elected to bowl.
- Points: The Blaze 4, Western Storm 0

30 June 2024
10:30
Scorecard

Western Storm; 156 (37 overs)	v	Southern Vipers; 157/3 (29.4 overs)
Fran Wilson 34 (41); Georgia Adams 3/17 (6 overs)		Georgia Elwiss 65* (71); Amanda-Jade Wellington 2/38 (7 overs)

Southern Vipers won by 7 wickets
County Ground, Hove
Umpires: James Tredwell and Rose Dovey

- Southern Vipers won the toss and elected to bowl.
- Points: Southern Vipers 5, Western Storm 0

7 July 2024
10:30
Scorecard

Western Storm; 200/5 (30 overs)	v	Northern Diamonds; 199/4 (26.4 overs)
Fran Wilson 61* (63); Abigail Glen 2/24 (6 overs)		Hollie Armitage 101* (76); Ellie Anderson 1/22 (2.4 overs)

Northern Diamonds won by 6 wickets (DLS)
College Ground, Cheltenham
Umpires: Paul Pollard and Sophie McLelland

- Northern Diamonds won the toss and elected to bowl.
- Western Storm innings reduced to 30 overs due to rain.
- Northern Diamonds innings reduced to 29 overs due to rain; target was 199.
- Points: Northern Diamonds 4, Western Storm 0

10 July 2024
10:30
Scorecard

Western Storm; 217 (46.5 overs)	v	The Blaze; 220/5 (42.3 overs)
Fran Wilson 67 (68); Kathryn Bryce 4/20 (8.5 overs)		Sarah Bryce 61 (54); Alex Griffiths 2/33 (5 overs)

The Blaze won by 5 wickets
College Ground, Cheltenham
Umpires: Ben Peverall and Julia Jarvis

- The Blaze won the toss and elected to bowl.
- Points: The Blaze 4, Western Storm 0

12 July 2024
10:30
Scorecard

Western Storm; 284 (49.5 overs)	v	Central Sparks; 102 (25 overs)
Amanda-Jade Wellington 83 (53); Katie George 5/50 (9.5 overs)		Davina Perrin 42 (55); Chloe Skelton 3/8 (5 overs)

Western Storm won by 182 runs
New Road, Worcester
Umpires: Joanne Ibbotson and Simon Widdup

- Central Sparks won the toss and elected to bowl.
- Points: Western Storm 5, Central Sparks 0

26 August 2024
10:30
Scorecard

Central Sparks; 297/3 (50 overs)	v	Western Storm; 152 (33 overs)
Evelyn Jones 130 (163); Ellie Anderson 2/46 (8 overs)		Sophia Smale 53 (47); Georgia Davis 6/23 (10 overs)

Central Sparks won by 145 runs
County Ground, Taunton
Umpires: Gabi Brown and Sue Redfern

- Western Storm won the toss and elected to bowl.
- Points: Central Sparks 5, Western Storm 0

31 August 2024
10:30
Scorecard

Western Storm; 282/8 (50 overs)	v	South East Stars; 283/5 (47.2 overs)
Fran Wilson 81 (92); Bryony Smith 2/43 (7 overs)		Kira Chathli 86* (81); Alex Griffiths 1/29 (3 overs)

South East Stars won by 5 wickets
County Ground, Beckenham
Umpires: Anthony Harris and Julia Jarvis

- Western Storm won the toss and elected to bat.
- Points: South East Stars 4, Western Storm 0

4 September 2024
10:30
Scorecard

Western Storm; 180 (45.5 overs)	v	Sunrisers; 150 (39.3 overs)
Amanda-Jade Wellington 45* (42); Sophie Munro 3/42 (10 overs)		Alice Macleod 48 (61); Chloe Skelton 5/29 (9.3 overs)

Western Storm won by 30 runs
Brunton Memorial Ground, Radlett
Umpires: Nigel Llong and Rose Dovey

- Sunrisers won the toss and elected to bowl.
- Points: Western Storm 4, Sunrisers 0

7 September 2024
10:30
Scorecard

North West Thunder; 216/9 (50 overs)	v	Western Storm; 69/2 (20 overs)
Eleanor Threlkeld 69* (93); Mollie Robbins 3/28 (10 overs)		Sophie Luff 16* (39); Grace Johnson 1/14 (4 overs)

North West Thunder won by 2 runs (DLS)
County Ground, Taunton
Umpires: Fiona Richards and Mark Newell

- North West Thunder won the toss and elected to bat.
- Western Storm innings curtailed at 20 overs due to rain; target was 72.
- Points: North West Thunder 4, Western Storm 0

=== Tournament statistics ===
==== Batting ====
Player	Matches	Innings	Runs	Average	High score	100s	50s
Fran Wilson	14	14	500	41.66	81	0	5
Sophie Luff	14	14	491	40.91	76*	0	5
Nat Wraith	14	13	428	35.66	73	0	2
Sophia Smale	14	14	285	20.35	53	0	1
Amanda-Jade Wellington	13	12	282	31.33	83	0	1

Source: ESPN Cricinfo Qualification: 200 runs.

==== Bowling ====
Player	Matches	Overs	Wickets	Average	Economy	BBI	5wi
Chloe Skelton	14	99.1	17	27.47	4.70	5/29	1
Amanda-Jade Wellington	13	112.0	15	31.26	4.18	3/30	0
Sophia Smale	14	107.5	13	40.30	4.85	3/42	0

Source: ESPN Cricinfo Qualification: 10 wickets.

== Charlotte Edwards Cup ==
=== Season standings ===
Pos	Team	Pld	W	L	T	NR	BP	Pts	NRR
1	The Blaze (Q)	10	9	1	0	0	3	39	0.606
2	South East Stars (Q)	10	7	2	0	1	4	34	0.309
3	Southern Vipers (Q)	10	6	4	0	0	2	26	1.001
4	Central Sparks (Q)	10	6	4	0	0	2	26	0.402
5	North West Thunder	10	3	6	0	1	1	15	−0.727
6	Northern Diamonds	10	3	7	0	0	1	13	−0.067
7	Western Storm	10	2	6	0	2	1	13	−0.659
8	Sunrisers	10	2	8	0	0	0	8	−1.073

Source: ESPNCricinfo

advanced to the Semi-finals

=== Fixtures ===
19 May 2024
14:30
Scorecard

South East Stars; 132/9 (20 overs)	v	Western Storm; 128/6 (20 overs)
Aylish Cranstone 31 (20); Amanda-Jade Wellington 3/22 (4 overs)		Emma Corney 40 (37); Danielle Gregory 1/18 (3 overs)

South East Stars won by 4 runs
County Ground, Bristol
Umpires: Ben Peverall and Grace Bambury

- South East Stars won the toss and elected to bat.
- Points: South East Stars 4, Western Storm 0

22 May 2024
18:30
Scorecard

Central Sparks; 168/6 (20 overs)	v	Western Storm; 147 (18.3 overs)
Abigail Freeborn 68 (40); Chloe Skelton 2/31 (4 overs)		Danielle Gibson 40 (21); Katie George 4/36 (4 overs)

Central Sparks won by 21 runs
County Ground, Taunton
Umpires: James Tredwell and Julia Jarvis

- Western Storm won the toss and elected to bowl.
- Points: Central Sparks 4, Western Storm 0

27 May 2024
14:30
Scorecard

Western Storm; 38/3 (6 overs)	v	South East Stars
Niamh Holland 20 (18); Tash Farrant 1/8 (2 overs)

No result
County Ground, Beckenham
Umpires: Fiona Richards and James Tredwell

- South East Stars won the toss and elected to bowl.
- No further play possible due to rain.
- Points: South East Stars 2, Western Storm 2

30 May 2024
15:00
Scorecard

Southern Vipers; 173/5 (20 overs)	v	Western Storm; 145/7 (20 overs)
Georgia Adams 48 (34); Amanda-Jade Wellington 3/20 (4 overs)		Sophie Luff 34* (31); Charli Knott 4/23 (4 overs)

Southern Vipers won by 28 runs
Rose Bowl, Southampton
Umpires: Ben Peverall and Rose Dovey

- Western Storm won the toss and elected to bowl.
- Points: Southern Vipers 4, Western Storm 0

31 May 2024
14:30
Scorecard

Western Storm; 134/8 (20 overs)	v	Sunrisers; 106 (17.4 overs)
Sophie Luff 41 (34); Mady Villiers 2/20 (4 overs)		Florence Miller 28 (30); Ellie Anderson 4/9 (2.4 overs)

Western Storm won by 28 runs
County Ground, Taunton
Umpires: Ben Peverall and Gabi Brown

- Sunrisers won the toss and elected to bowl.
- Points: Western Storm 5, Sunrisers 0

7 June 2024
14:30
Scorecard

Western Storm; 99 (19.3 overs)	v	The Blaze; 103/3 (14.1 overs)
Heather Knight 20 (19); Heather Graham 4/10 (3.3 overs)		Kathryn Bryce 46 (33); Ellie Anderson 1/16 (2 overs)

The Blaze won by 7 wickets
Grace Road, Leicester
Umpires: Neil Pratt and Rose Dovey

- Western Storm won the toss and elected to bat.
- Points: The Blaze 5, Western Storm 0

9 June 2024
10:30
Scorecard

Southern Vipers; 137/9 (20 overs)	v	Western Storm; 119 (20 overs)
Georgia Adams 55 (40); Lauren Filer 3/8 (4 overs)		Heather Knight 69 (56); Georgia Adams 3/23 (4 overs)

Southern Vipers won by 18 runs
County Ground, Bristol
Umpires: Fiona Richards and Jack Shantry

- Western Storm won the toss and elected to bowl.
- Points: Southern Vipers 4, Western Storm 0

13 June 2024
14:30
Scorecard

Western Storm	v	North West Thunder

Match Abandoned
Sophia Gardens, Cardiff

- No toss.
- No play possible due to rain.
- Points: Western Storm 2, North West Thunder 2

16 June 2024
11:00
Scorecard

Northern Diamonds; 146/3 (20 overs)	v	Western Storm; 118/7 (20 overs)
Hollie Armitage 97 (64); Sophia Smale 1/23 (4 overs); Issy Wong 1/23 (4 overs)		Fran Wilson 42 (44); Katie Levick 2/13 (4 overs)

Northern Diamonds won by 28 runs
Headingley Cricket Ground, Leeds
Umpires: Amy Clark and Peter Hartley

- Western Storm won the toss and elected to bat.
- Points: Northern Diamonds 4, Western Storm 0

19 June 2024
11:30
Scorecard

Western Storm; 142/7 (20 overs)	v	Sunrisers; 131/9 (20 overs)
Heather Knight 66 (43); Sophie Munro 4/23 (4 overs)		Jodi Grewcock 40 (34); Amanda-Jade Wellington 2/24 (4 overs)

Western Storm won by 11 runs
County Ground, Chelmsford
Umpires: Julia Jarvis and Rob White

- Western Storm won the toss and elected to bat.
- Points: Western Storm 4, Sunrisers 0

=== Tournament statistics ===
==== Batting ====
Player	Matches	Innings	Runs	Average	High score	100s	50s
Heather Knight	3	3	155	51.66	69	0	2

Source: ESPN Cricinfo Qualification: 150 runs.

==== Bowling ====
Player	Matches	Overs	Wickets	Average	Economy	BBI	5wi
Amanda-Jade Wellington	9	30.1	12	15.41	6.13	3/17	0
Sophia Smale	9	29.0	10	19.90	6.86	3/15	0

Source: ESPN Cricinfo Qualification: 10 wickets.

== Season statistics ==
=== Batting ===
Player	Rachael Heyhoe Flint Trophy								Charlotte Edwards Cup							
Player	Matches	Innings	Runs	High score	Average	Strike rate	100s	50s	Matches	Innings	Runs	High score	Average	Strike rate	100s	50s
Ellie Anderson	9	5	27	14	6.75	67.50	0	0	7	2	1	1*	1.00	20.00	0	0
Emma Corney	8	8	179	40	22.37	66.05	0	0	7	7	149	46	21.28	100.00	0	0
Lauren Filer	3	2	16	8	8.00	100.00	0	0	5	3	8	5*	8.00	72.72	0	0
Danielle Gibson	4	4	75	51	18.75	129.31	0	1	3	3	55	40	18.33	166.66	0	0
Alex Griffiths	14	12	107	26	9.72	62.57	0	0	6	6	52	19	8.66	91.22	0	0
Jess Hazell	1	–	–	–	–	–	–	–	2	1	5	5	5.00	100.00	0	0
Niamh Holland	13	12	152	29	13.81	61.78	0	0	5	5	83	32	16.60	84.69	0	0
Katie Jones	6	4	28	11	7.00	51.85	0	0	–	–	–	–	–	–	–	–
Heather Knight	1	1	62	62	62.00	105.08	0	1	3	3	155	69	51.66	131.35	0	2
Sophie Luff	14	14	491	76*	40.91	66.71	0	5	9	9	130	41	18.57	90.90	0	0
Mollie Robbins	7	5	12	7	3.00	40.00	0	0	3	2	16	9	8.00	145.45	0	0
Chloe Skelton	14	10	65	29*	16.25	85.52	0	0	9	5	18	7	4.50	54.54	0	0
Sophia Smale	14	14	285	53	20.35	61.68	0	1	9	6	38	14*	9.50	88.37	0	0
Amanda-Jade Wellington	13	12	282	83	31.33	128.76	0	1	9	8	124	31*	24.80	153.08	0	0
Fran Wilson	14	14	500	81	41.66	89.12	0	5	7	6	74	42	12.33	87.05	0	0
Issy Wong	5	4	17	10*	5.66	60.71	0	0	7	6	24	10	4.80	82.75	0	0
Nat Wraith	14	13	428	73	35.66	95.11	0	2	9	9	68	21	8.50	78.16	0	0
Source: ESPN Cricinfo

=== Bowling ===
Player	Rachael Heyhoe Flint Trophy							Charlotte Edwards Cup						
Player	Matches	Overs	Wickets	Average	Economy	BBI	5wi	Matches	Overs	Wickets	Average	Economy	BBI	5wi
Ellie Anderson	9	54.1	9	37.66	6.25	3/35	0	7	16.4	6	21.16	7.62	4/9	0
Lauren Filer	3	19.5	1	106.00	5.34	1/13	0	5	18.0	8	11.25	5.00	3/8	0
Danielle Gibson	4	27.0	4	35.50	5.25	3/44	0	3	6.0	2	27.50	9.16	1/27	0
Alex Griffiths	14	60.4	9	43.33	6.42	2/23	0	6	7.0	2	35.50	10.14	1/17	0
Niamh Holland	13	30.2	5	41.20	6.79	2/21	0	5	4.0	0	–	12.25	–	0
Mollie Robbins	7	36.0	4	42.50	4.72	3/28	0	3	1.0	0	–	9.00	–	0
Chloe Skelton	14	99.1	17	27.47	4.70	5/29	1	9	22.0	4	43.00	7.81	2/31	0
Sophia Smale	14	107.5	13	40.30	4.85	3/42	0	9	29.0	10	19.90	6.86	3/15	0
Amanda-Jade Wellington	13	112.0	15	31.26	4.18	3/30	0	9	30.1	12	15.41	6.13	3/17	0
Issy Wong	5	32.0	5	37.20	5.81	3/20	0	7	18.0	4	31.00	6.88	1/13	0
Source: ESPN Cricinfo

=== Fielding ===
Player	Rachael Heyhoe Flint Trophy			Charlotte Edwards Cup		
Player	Matches	Innings	Catches	Matches	Innings	Catches
Ellie Anderson	9	9	0	7	6	2
Emma Corney	8	8	0	7	6	2
Lauren Filer	3	3	0	5	5	0
Danielle Gibson	4	4	1	3	3	2
Alex Griffiths	14	14	4	6	5	3
Jess Hazell	1	1	1	2	1	0
Niamh Holland	13	13	2	5	4	1
Katie Jones	6	3	0	–	–	–
Heather Knight	1	1	3	3	3	1
Sophie Luff	14	14	5	9	8	1
Mollie Robbins	7	7	1	3	3	1
Chloe Skelton	14	14	0	9	8	4
Sophia Smale	14	14	5	9	8	5
Amanda-Jade Wellington	13	13	1	9	8	2
Fran Wilson	14	14	5	7	7	3
Issy Wong	5	5	1	7	6	1
Nat Wraith	14	3	1	9	0	0
Source: ESPN Cricinfo

=== Wicket-keeping ===
Player	Rachael Heyhoe Flint Trophy				Charlotte Edwards Cup			
Player	Matches	Innings	Catches	Stumpings	Matches	Innings	Catches	Stumpings
Katie Jones	6	3	5	1	–	–	–	–
Nat Wraith	14	11	6	0	9	8	5	2
Source: ESPN Cricinfo
