= 2022 Western Storm season =

English cricket season

Western Storm
2022 season
- Coach: Dan Helesfay (CEC); Trevor Griffin (RHFT)
- Captain: Sophie Luff
- RHFT: 4th
- CEC: Group A, 3rd
- Most runs: RHFT: Sophie Luff (268); CEC: Georgia Hennessy (158) & Sophie Luff (158)
- Most wickets: RHFT: Lauren Filer (11); CEC: Claire Nicholas (6) & Danielle Gibson (6)
- Most catches: RHFT: Danielle Gibson (5); CEC: Danielle Gibson (3) & Sophie Luff (3)
- Most wicket-keeping dismissals: RHFT: Nat Wraith (6); CEC: Nat Wraith (4)

The 2022 season saw Western Storm compete in the 50 over Rachael Heyhoe Flint Trophy and the Twenty20 Charlotte Edwards Cup. In the Charlotte Edwards Cup, the side won three of their six matches, finishing third in Group A. In the Rachael Heyhoe Flint Trophy, the side finished fourth in the group, winning three of their seven matches.

The side was captained by Sophie Luff. After the departure of Mark O'Leary as coach at the start of the season, the side was coached on an interim basis by Dan Helesfay during the Charlotte Edwards Cup, before Trevor Griffin took up the position on a permanent basis starting with the Rachael Heyhoe Flint Trophy. They played two home matches at the County Ground, Taunton, two at the County Ground, Bristol, one at Sophia Gardens and one at College Ground, Cheltenham.

== Squad ==
=== Changes ===
On 25 November 2021, it was announced that Fran Wilson had signed for the side from Sunrisers. Wilson had previously played for Storm between 2016 and 2019 in the Women's Cricket Super League. On 16 February 2022, it was announced that Mark O'Leary was stepping down from his role as Head Coach. On 27 April 2022, it was announced that Anya Shrubsole had left the side, joining Southern Vipers in a player-coach role. On 11 May 2022, the side announced their 17-player squad for the upcoming season: compared to the previous year, Sophia Smale was added, and Emma Corney, Emily Edgcombe, Steph Hutchins, Joleigh Roberts and Chloe Skelton were removed. On 17 May 2022, it was announced that Dan Helesfay would be interim Head Coach for the Charlotte Edwards Cup, with Trevor Griffin, coach of the side between 2017 and 2019, returning to the position on a permanent basis from the Rachael Heyhoe Flint Trophy onwards. Chloe Skelton returned to the full squad to play a match in the Rachael Heyhoe Flint Trophy on 9 July. Emma Corney returned to the full squad to play a match in the Rachael Heyhoe Flint Trophy on 11 September. Emily Geach and Katie Jones were added to the full squad on 17 September 2022.

=== Squad list ===
- Age given is at the start of Western Storm's first match of the season (14 May 2022).

Name	Nationality	Birth date	Batting Style	Bowling Style	Notes
Batters
Sophie Luff	England	6 December 1993 (aged 28)	Right-handed	Right-arm medium	Captain
Lauren Parfitt	Wales	1 April 1994 (aged 28)	Right-handed	Slow left-arm orthodox	
Fran Wilson	England	7 November 1991 (aged 30)	Right-handed	Right-arm off break	
All-rounders
Emma Corney	England	15 September 2003 (aged 18)	Right-handed	Right-arm medium	Joined September 2022
Katie George	England	7 April 1999 (aged 23)	Right-handed	Left-arm medium	
Danielle Gibson	England	30 April 2001 (aged 21)	Right-handed	Right-arm medium	
Alex Griffiths	Wales	12 June 2002 (aged 19)	Right-handed	Right-arm medium	
Georgia Hennessy	England	4 November 1996 (aged 25)	Right-handed	Right-arm medium	
Niamh Holland	England	27 October 2004 (aged 17)	Right-handed	Right-arm medium	
Heather Knight	England	26 December 1990 (aged 31)	Right-handed	Right-arm off break	
Fi Morris	England	31 January 1994 (aged 28)	Right-handed	Right-arm off break	
Chloe Skelton	England	20 June 2001 (aged 20)	Right-handed	Right-arm off break	Joined July 2022
Wicket-keepers
Bethan Gammon	Wales	10 March 2001 (aged 21)	Right-handed	—	
Katie Jones	England	28 December 2005 (aged 16)	Right-handed	—	Joined September 2022
Nat Wraith	England	3 October 2001 (aged 20)	Right-handed	—	
Bowlers
Lauren Filer	England	22 December 2000 (aged 21)	Right-handed	Right-arm medium	
Emily Geach	England	15 February 2004 (aged 18)	Left-handed	Right-arm medium	Joined September 2022
Nicole Harvey	England	18 September 1992 (aged 29)	Right-handed	Right-arm leg break	
Claire Nicholas	Wales	8 September 1986 (aged 35)	Right-handed	Right-arm off break	
Mollie Robbins	England	4 October 1998 (aged 23)	Right-handed	Right-arm medium	
Sophia Smale	Wales	8 December 2004 (aged 17)	Right-handed	Slow left-arm orthodox	

== Charlotte Edwards Cup ==
=== Group A ===
Pos	Team	Pld	W	L	T	NR	BP	Pts	NRR
1	South East Stars (Q)	6	5	1	0	0	1	21	0.660
2	Central Sparks (Q)	6	4	2	0	0	1	17	0.552
3	Western Storm	6	3	3	0	0	1	13	0.148
4	Sunrisers	6	0	6	0	0	0	0	−1.287

Source: England and Wales Cricket Board
- advanced to the semi-final

=== Fixtures ===
14 May 2022
14:30 BST
Scorecard

Central Sparks; 156/4 (20 overs)	v	Western Storm; 136/6 (20 overs)
Amy Jones 52 (44); Danielle Gibson 2/37 (4 overs)		Sophie Luff 43 (29); Issy Wong 2/28 (4 overs)

Central Sparks won by 20 runs
Sophia Gardens, Cardiff
Umpires: Anna Harris and Hassan Adnan

- Western Storm won the toss and elected to field.
- Points: Central Sparks 4, Western Storm 0

18 May 2022
19:00 BST (D/N)
Scorecard

Sunrisers; 160/5 (20 overs)	v	Western Storm; 164/9 (20 overs)
Grace Scrivens 56 (42); Heather Knight 1/22 (4 overs)		Katie George 34 (23); Grace Scrivens 4/33 (4 overs)

Western Storm won by 1 wicket
County Ground, Chelmsford
Umpires: Chris Watts and Sue Redfern

- Western Storm won the toss and chose to field.
- Points: Western Storm 4, Sunrisers 0

21 May 2022
11:00 BST
Scorecard

Western Storm; 145/6 (20 overs)	v	South East Stars; 148/3 (19 overs)
Georgia Hennessy 50 (52); Bryony Smith 2/22 (3 overs)		Aylish Cranstone 66* (49); Claire Nicholas 2/17 (4 overs)

South East Stars won by 7 wickets
County Ground, Beckenham
Umpires: Ben Debenham and Sarah Bartlett

- South East Stars won the toss and elected to field.
- Points: South East Stars 4, Western Storm 0

29 May 2022
11:00 BST
Scorecard

Western Storm; 169/5 (20 overs)	v	Sunrisers; 128/6 (20 overs)
Sophie Luff 78 (54); Kelly Castle 2/16 (3 overs)		Naomi Dattani 53 (51); Danielle Gibson 2/13 (2 overs)

Western Storm won by 41 runs
County Ground, Taunton
Umpires: Alex Wharf and Sophie McLelland

- Western Storm won the toss and elected to bat.
- Points: Western Storm 5, Sunrisers 0

1 June 2022
14:30 BST
Scorecard

Western Storm; 109/8 (20 overs)	v	South East Stars; 112/7 (19.3 overs)
Fran Wilson 33* (30); Kalea Moore 3/4 (2 overs)		Alice Davidson-Richards 35 (25); Sophia Smale 2/18 (4 overs)

South East Stars won by 3 wickets
County Ground, Bristol
Umpires: Anna Harris and Sarah Bartlett

- South East Stars won the toss and elected to field.
- Points: South East Stars 4, Western Storm 0

4 June 2022
14:30 BST
Scorecard

Central Sparks; 134/4 (20 overs)	v	Western Storm; 135/3 (18.5 overs)
Amy Jones 63 (46); Sophia Smale 2/17 (4 overs)		Georgia Hennessy 47* (45); Emily Arlott 2/29 (4 overs)

Western Storm won by 7 wickets
New Road, Worcester
Umpires: Jane Pratt and Naeem Ashraf

- Central Sparks won the toss and elected to bat.
- Points: Western Storm 4, Central Sparks 0

=== Tournament statistics ===
==== Batting ====
Player	Matches	Innings	Runs	Average	High score	100s	50s
Georgia Hennessy	6	6	158	39.50	50	0	1
Sophie Luff	6	6	158	26.33	78	0	1
Fran Wilson	6	6	112	37.33	33*	0	0
Heather Knight	3	3	96	32.00	35	0	0
Danielle Gibson	6	6	96	19.20	27	0	0
Katie George	6	5	56	18.66	34	0	0

Source: ESPN Cricinfo Qualification: 50 runs.

==== Bowling ====
Player	Matches	Overs	Wickets	Average	Economy	BBI	5wi
Claire Nicholas	5	20.0	6	17.50	5.25	2/17	0
Danielle Gibson	6	20.0	6	25.66	7.70	2/13	0

Source: ESPN Cricinfo Qualification: 5 wickets.

== Rachael Heyhoe Flint Trophy ==
=== Season standings ===
Pos	Team	Pld	W	L	T	NR	BP	Pts	NRR
1	Northern Diamonds (Q)	7	6	0	0	1	2	28	0.851
2	South East Stars (Q)	7	5	1	0	1	4	26	0.687
3	Southern Vipers (Q)	7	5	1	0	1	2	24	0.762
4	Western Storm	7	3	3	0	1	1	15	−0.214
5	Central Sparks	7	2	4	0	1	1	11	0.073
6	Lightning	7	2	4	0	1	1	11	−0.630
7	North West Thunder	7	1	5	0	1	0	6	−0.366
8	Sunrisers	7	0	6	0	1	0	2	−1.046

Source: England and Wales Cricket Board

advanced to final advanced to the play-off

=== Fixtures ===
2 July 2022
10:30 BST
Scorecard

Western Storm; 260/9 (50 overs)	v	Lightning; 166/9 (34.2 overs)
Sophie Luff 48 (66); Piepa Cleary 3/45 (10 overs)		Lucy Higham 34 (39); Lauren Filer 3/35 (8 overs)

Western Storm won by 75 runs (DLS)
Haslegrave Ground, Loughborough
Umpires: Jasmine Naeem and Naeem Ashraf

- Lightning won the toss and elected to field.
- Lightning innings curtailed at 34.2 overs due to rain; target was 242.
- Points: Western Storm 5, Lightning 0

9 July 2022
10:30 BST
Scorecard

Central Sparks; 206 (50 overs)	v	Western Storm; 184/9 (50 overs)
Ami Campbell 50 (75); Lauren Filer 3/36 (10 overs)		Lauren Filer 58* (69); Sarah Glenn 4/23 (10 overs)

Central Sparks won by 22 runs
County Ground, Bristol
Umpires: Jack Shantry and Sophie McLelland

- Central Sparks won the toss and elected to bat.
- Points: Central Sparks 4, Western Storm 0

16 July 2022
10:30 BST
Scorecard

Sunrisers; 254/6 (50 overs)	v	Western Storm; 257/7 (49 overs)
Cordelia Griffith 74 (106); Niamh Holland 2/32 (7 overs)		Sophie Luff 100* (142); Mady Villiers 2/33 (10 overs)

Western Storm won by 3 wickets
County Ground, Chelmsford
Umpires: Bob White and Sophie McLelland

- Sunrisers won the toss and elected to bat.
- Points: Western Storm 4, Sunrisers 0

23 July 2022
10:30 BST
Scorecard

South East Stars; 283/8 (50 overs)	v	Western Storm; 247 (48 overs)
Chloe Brewer 61 (53); Chloe Skelton 5/54 (9 overs)		Sophie Luff 95 (119); Alice Davidson-Richards 4/33 (8 overs)

South East Stars won by 36 runs
College Ground, Cheltenham
Umpires: Anthony Harris and Jasmine Naeem

- South East Stars won the toss and elected to bat.
- Points: South East Stars 4, Western Storm 0

9 September 2022
10:30 BST

Southern Vipers	v	Western Storm

No Result
County Ground, Hove

- The match was postponed due to the death of Queen Elizabeth II, and later deemed a no result with points shared.
- Points: Southern Vipers 2, Western Storm 2

11 September 2022
10:30 BST
Scorecard

Northern Diamonds; 334/6 (50 overs)	v	Western Storm; 230 (45.4 overs)
Hollie Armitage 131* (131); Chloe Skelton 2/39 (10 overs)		Danielle Gibson 76 (59); Katie Levick 4/41 (8.4 overs)

Northern Diamonds won by 104 runs
County Ground, Taunton
Umpires: Ben Peverall and Paul Baldwin

- Northern Diamonds won the toss and elected to bat.
- Points: Northern Diamonds 5, Western Storm 0

18 September 2022
10:30 BST
Scorecard

North West Thunder; 242/5 (50 overs)	v	Western Storm; 239/8 (44.3 overs)
Seren Smale 57 (93); Lauren Filer 3/46 (10 overs)		Danielle Gibson 56 (40); Laura Jackson 3/50 (10 overs)

Western Storm won by 2 wickets (DLS)
Old Trafford Cricket Ground, Manchester
Umpires: Naeem Ashraf and Grace Bambury

- Western Storm won the toss and elected to field.
- Western Storm innings reduced to 48 overs due to rain; target was 239.
- Points: Western Storm 4, North West Thunder 0

=== Tournament statistics ===
==== Batting ====
Player	Matches	Innings	Runs	Average	High score	100s	50s
Sophie Luff	6	6	268	53.60	100*	1	1
Danielle Gibson	6	6	176	29.33	76	0	2
Sophia Smale	6	6	133	44.33	59	0	1
Alex Griffiths	6	6	122	20.33	48	0	0
Katie George	5	5	119	23.80	74	0	1
Fran Wilson	6	6	110	18.33	43	0	0

Source: ESPN Cricinfo Qualification: 100 runs.

==== Bowling ====
Player	Matches	Overs	Wickets	Average	Economy	BBI	5wi
Lauren Filer	6	49.0	11	22.63	5.08	3/35	0
Chloe Skelton	4	39.0	10	17.20	4.41	5/54	1
Danielle Gibson	6	32.2	5	31.20	4.82	2/26	0

Source: ESPN Cricinfo Qualification: 5 wickets.

== Season statistics ==
=== Batting ===
Player	Rachael Heyhoe Flint Trophy								Charlotte Edwards Cup							
Player	Matches	Innings	Runs	High score	Average	Strike rate	100s	50s	Matches	Innings	Runs	High score	Average	Strike rate	100s	50s
Emma Corney	2	2	52	29	26.00	67.53	0	0	–	–	–	–	–	–	–	–
Lauren Filer	6	5	89	58*	22.25	84.76	0	1	2	1	1	1	1.00	100.00	0	0
Emily Geach	1	–	–	–	–	–	–	–	–	–	–	–	–	–	–	–
Katie George	5	5	119	74	23.80	117.82	0	1	6	5	56	34	18.66	143.58	0	0
Danielle Gibson	6	6	176	76	29.33	115.03	0	2	6	6	96	27	19.20	143.28	0	0
Alex Griffiths	6	6	122	48	20.33	54.95	0	0	6	3	44	25*	44.00	137.50	0	0
Nicole Harvey	–	–	–	–	–	–	–	–	1	–	–	–	–	–	–	–
Georgia Hennessy	2	2	11	11	5.50	55.00	0	0	6	6	158	50	39.50	92.94	0	1
Niamh Holland	3	3	16	6	5.33	47.05	0	0	3	2	5	5	2.50	100.00	0	0
Heather Knight	–	–	–	–	–	–	–	–	3	3	96	35	32.00	126.31	0	0
Sophie Luff	6	6	268	100*	53.60	65.84	1	1	6	6	158	78	26.33	115.32	0	1
Fi Morris	2	2	27	26	13.50	61.36	0	0	5	5	48	21	9.60	104.34	0	0
Claire Nicholas	4	3	14	12*	–	66.66	0	0	5	–	–	–	–	–	–	–
Lauren Parfitt	1	1	9	9	9.00	69.23	0	0	–	–	–	–	–	–	–	–
Chloe Skelton	4	4	47	25*	23.50	51.64	0	0	–	–	–	–	–	–	–	–
Sophia Smale	6	6	133	59	44.33	60.73	0	1	5	1	3	3*	–	75.00	0	0
Fran Wilson	6	6	110	43	18.33	94.01	0	0	6	6	112	33*	37.33	103.70	0	0
Nat Wraith	6	6	98	35	16.33	92.45	0	0	6	4	39	27	9.75	118.18	0	0
Source: ESPN Cricinfo

=== Bowling ===
Player	Rachael Heyhoe Flint Trophy							Charlotte Edwards Cup						
Player	Matches	Overs	Wickets	Average	Economy	BBI	5wi	Matches	Overs	Wickets	Average	Economy	BBI	5wi
Lauren Filer	6	49.0	11	22.63	5.08	3/35	0	2	5.0	1	50.00	10.00	1/30	0
Emily Geach	1	10.0	0	–	5.20	–	0	–	–	–	–	–	–	–
Katie George	5	26.0	0	–	6.03	–	0	6	9.0	2	32.00	7.11	1/21	0
Danielle Gibson	6	32.2	5	31.20	4.82	2/26	0	6	20.0	6	25.66	7.70	2/23	0
Alex Griffiths	6	10.0	1	55.00	5.50	1/33	0	6	13.3	2	44.00	6.51	1/23	0
Nicole Harvey	–	–	–	–	–	–	–	1	2.0	0	–	10.50	–	0
Georgia Hennessy	2	–	–	–	–	–	–	6	16.0	3	45.66	8.56	1/22	0
Niamh Holland	3	17.0	4	19.50	4.58	2/17	0	3	3.0	0	–	7.33	–	0
Heather Knight	–	–	–	–	–	–	–	3	11.0	2	31.00	5.63	1/18	0
Fi Morris	2	15.0	2	31.50	4.20	1/26	0	5	1.0	0	–	11.00	–	0
Claire Nicholas	4	27.0	3	61.00	6.77	1/36	0	5	20.0	6	17.50	5.25	2/17	0
Lauren Parfitt	1	4.0	2	11.00	5.50	2/22	0	–	–	–	–	–	–	–
Chloe Skelton	4	39.0	10	17.20	4.41	5/54	1	–	–	–	–	–	–	–
Sophia Smale	6	55.0	2	134.00	4.87	2/40	0	5	18.0	4	28.00	6.22	2/17	0
Source: ESPN Cricinfo

=== Fielding ===
Player	Rachael Heyhoe Flint Trophy			Charlotte Edwards Cup		
Player	Matches	Innings	Catches	Matches	Innings	Catches
Emma Corney	2	2	0	–	–	–
Lauren Filer	6	6	1	2	2	1
Emily Geach	1	1	0	–	–	–
Katie George	5	5	1	6	6	0
Danielle Gibson	6	6	5	6	6	3
Alex Griffiths	6	6	0	6	6	1
Nicole Harvey	–	–	–	1	1	0
Georgia Hennessy	2	2	0	6	6	2
Niamh Holland	3	3	1	3	3	1
Heather Knight	–	–	–	3	3	1
Sophie Luff	6	6	2	6	6	3
Fi Morris	2	2	3	5	5	0
Claire Nicholas	4	4	3	5	5	1
Lauren Parfitt	1	1	0	–	–	–
Chloe Skelton	4	4	4	–	–	–
Sophia Smale	6	6	3	5	5	1
Fran Wilson	6	6	2	6	6	0
Source: ESPN Cricinfo

=== Wicket-keeping ===
Player	Rachael Heyhoe Flint Trophy				Charlotte Edwards Cup			
Player	Matches	Innings	Catches	Stumpings	Matches	Innings	Catches	Stumpings
Nat Wraith	6	6	6	0	6	6	1	3
Source: ESPN Cricinfo
