= 2021 Western Storm season =

English cricket season

Western Storm
2021 season
- Coach: Mark O'Leary
- Captain: Sophie Luff
- RHFT: 6th
- CEC: Group B, 2nd
- Most runs: RHFT: Sophie Luff (417); CEC: Sophie Luff (127)
- Most wickets: RHFT: Georgia Hennessy (9); CEC: Nicole Harvey (12)
- Most catches: RHFT: Lauren Filer (3); CEC: Danielle Gibson (5)
- Most wicket-keeping dismissals: RHFT: Nat Wraith (10); CEC: Nat Wraith (6)

The 2021 season saw Western Storm compete in the 50 over Rachael Heyhoe Flint Trophy and the new Twenty20 competition, the Charlotte Edwards Cup. The side finished sixth in the Rachael Heyhoe Flint Trophy, with 3 wins from their 7 matches. In the Charlotte Edwards Cup, the side finished second in Group B, narrowly missing out on progressing to Finals Day.

The side was captained by Sophie Luff and coached by Mark O'Leary. They played three home matches at the County Ground, Bristol, three at the County Ground, Taunton and one, a first for the side, at Sophia Gardens.

== Squad ==
Western Storm announced their initial 18-player squad for the season on 27 May 2021. Claire Nicholas re-joined the squad on 25 August 2021 after being on maternity leave. Chloe Skelton and Joleigh Roberts were promoted to the senior squad from the Academy during the season, both playing their first match on 10 September 2021. Age given is at the start of Western Storm's first match of the season (29 May 2021).

Name	Nationality	Birth date	Batting Style	Bowling Style	Notes
Batters
Sophie Luff	England	6 December 1993 (aged 27)	Right-handed	Right-arm medium	Captain
Lauren Parfitt	Wales	1 April 1994 (aged 27)	Right-handed	Slow left-arm orthodox	
Chloe Skelton	England	20 June 2001 (aged 19)	Right-handed	Right-arm off break	
All-rounders
Emma Corney	England	15 September 2003 (aged 17)	Right-handed	Right-arm medium	
Katie George	England	7 April 1999 (aged 22)	Right-handed	Left-arm medium	
Danielle Gibson	England	30 April 2001 (aged 20)	Right-handed	Right-arm medium	
Alex Griffiths	Wales	12 June 2002 (aged 18)	Right-handed	Right-arm medium	
Georgia Hennessy	England	4 November 1996 (aged 24)	Right-handed	Right-arm medium	
Niamh Holland	England	27 October 2004 (aged 16)	Right-handed	Right-arm medium	
Heather Knight	England	26 December 1990 (aged 30)	Right-handed	Right-arm off break	
Fi Morris	England	31 January 1994 (aged 27)	Right-handed	Right-arm off break	
Wicket-keepers
Bethan Gammon	Wales	10 March 2001 (aged 20)	Right-handed	—	
Nat Wraith	England	3 October 2001 (aged 19)	Right-handed	—	
Bowlers
Emily Edgcombe	England	25 June 1999 (aged 21)	Right-handed	Left-arm medium	
Lauren Filer	England	22 December 2000 (aged 20)	Right-handed	Right-arm medium	
Nicole Harvey	England	18 September 1992 (aged 28)	Right-handed	Right-arm leg break	
Steph Hutchins	England	6 October 1998 (aged 22)	Right-handed	Right-arm off break	
Claire Nicholas	Wales	8 September 1986 (aged 34)	Right-handed	Right-arm off break	
Mollie Robbins	England	4 October 1998 (aged 22)	Right-handed	Right-arm medium	
Joleigh Roberts	England	Unknown	Right-handed	Right-arm medium	
Anya Shrubsole	England	7 December 1991 (aged 29)	Right-handed	Right-arm fast-medium	

== Rachael Heyhoe Flint Trophy ==
=== Season standings ===
Pos	Team	Pld	W	L	T	NR	BP	Pts	NRR
1	Southern Vipers (Q)	7	6	1	0	0	3	27	0.417
2	Northern Diamonds (Q)	7	5	2	0	0	3	23	1.182
3	Central Sparks (Q)	7	5	2	0	0	2	22	0.822
4	Lightning	7	3	4	0	0	1	13	0.274
5	South East Stars	7	3	4	0	0	1	13	−0.226
6	Western Storm	7	3	4	0	0	1	13	−0.462
7	North West Thunder	7	3	4	0	0	1	13	−0.620
8	Sunrisers	7	0	7	0	0	0	0	−1.598

Source: ESPN Cricinfo

Advanced to the final
Advanced to the play-off

=== Fixtures ===
29 May 2021
10:30 BST
Scorecard

North West Thunder; 291/8 (50 overs)	v	Western Storm; 295/9 (50 overs)
Emma Lamb 121 (105); Anya Shrubsole 3/29 (10 overs)		Heather Knight 91 (90); Kate Cross 3/35 (10 overs)

Western Storm won by 1 wicket
County Ground, Bristol
Umpires: Sarah Bartlett and Yvonne Dolphin-Cooper

- Western Storm won the toss and elected to field.
- Points: Western Storm 4, North West Thunder 0

31 May 2021
10:30 BST
Scorecard

Central Sparks; 295/7 (50 overs)	v	Western Storm; 254/9 (50 overs)
Amy Jones 163* (114); Lauren Filer 2/21 (6 overs)		Lauren Parfitt 91 (122); Ria Fackrell 4/34 (9 overs)

Central Sparks won by 41 runs
Edgbaston, Birmingham
Umpires: Sue Redfern and Yvonne Dolphin-Cooper

- Western Storm won the toss and elected to field.
- Points: Central Sparks 4, Western Storm 0

5 June 2021
10:30 BST
Scorecard

Western Storm; 245/8 (50 overs)	v	South East Stars; 249/4 (43.1 overs)
Heather Knight 73 (87); Tash Farrant 4/58 (10 overs)		Alice Davidson-Richards 92 (99); Nicole Harvey 2/43 (7 overs)

South East Stars won by 6 wickets
The Oval, London
Umpires: Sophie McLelland and Tom Lungley

- South East Stars won the toss and elected to field.
- Points: South East Stars 4, Western Storm 0

12 June 2021
13:00 BST (D/N)
Scorecard

Western Storm; 177 (49.3 overs)	v	Southern Vipers; 178/2 (34.5 overs)
Katie George 37 (60); Charlie Dean 3/27 (10 overs)		Georgia Adams 77 (101); Fi Morris 1/37 (6 overs)

Southern Vipers won by 8 wickets
County Ground, Taunton
Umpires: Mark Newell and Sophie McLelland
Player of the match: Georgia Adams (Southern Vipers)

- Western Storm won the toss and elected to bat.
- Points: Southern Vipers 5, Western Storm 0

10 September 2021
10:30 BST
Scorecard

Western Storm; 183 (38.1 overs)	v	Northern Diamonds; 184/3 (31.1 overs)
Sophie Luff 65 (77); Linsey Smith 5/34 (9.1 overs)		Hollie Armitage 68* (69); Steph Hutchins 2/27 (5 overs)

Northern Diamonds won by 7 wickets
Riverside Ground, Chester-le-Street
Umpires: James Middlebrook and Lina Nenova

- Northern Diamonds won the toss and elected to field.
- Points: Northern Diamonds 5, Western Storm 0

12 September 2021
10:30 BST
Scorecard

Western Storm; 228/7 (50 overs)	v	Lightning; 166 (41.2 overs)
Sophie Luff 70 (111); Kirstie Gordon 3/43 (10 overs)		Ella Claridge 39* (48); Georgia Hennessy 2/22 (8 overs)

Western Storm won by 62 runs
County Ground, Bristol
Umpires: Anna Harris and Ian Ramage

- Lightning won the toss and elected to field.
- Points: Western Storm 5, Lightning 0

18 September 2021
10:30 BST
Scorecard

Western Storm; 313/4 (50 overs)	v	Sunrisers; 277 (44.3 overs)
Sophie Luff 157* (142); Mady Villiers 2/39 (10 overs)		Cordelia Griffith 49 (42); Georgia Hennessy 2/45 (8 overs)

Western Storm won by 36 runs
County Ground, Bristol
Umpires: Yvonne Dolphin-Cooper and Tom Lungley

- Western Storm won the toss and elected to bat.
- Points: Western Storm 4, Sunrisers 0

=== Tournament statistics ===
==== Batting ====
Player	Matches	Innings	Runs	Average	High score	100s	50s
Sophie Luff	7	7	417	69.50	157*	1	3
Heather Knight	3	3	223	74.33	91	0	3
Fi Morris	7	7	169	24.14	32	0	0
Lauren Parfitt	6	6	131	21.83	91	0	1
Alex Griffiths	3	3	121	40.33	55	0	1
Anya Shrubsole	3	3	101	50.50	61	0	1
Danielle Gibson	7	7	100	16.66	29	0	0

Source: ESPN Cricinfo Qualification: 100 runs.

==== Bowling ====
Player	Matches	Overs	Wickets	Average	Economy	BBI	5wi
Georgia Hennessy	7	57.0	9	31.22	4.92	3/57	0
Nicole Harvey	6	39.2	6	29.83	4.55	2/25	0
Fi Morris	7	35.0	5	40.40	5.77	2/34	0
Lauren Filer	7	39.0	5	42.40	5.43	2/21	0

Source: ESPN Cricinfo Qualification: 5 wickets.

== Charlotte Edwards Cup ==
=== Group B ===
Pos	Team	Pld	W	L	T	NR	BP	Pts	NRR
1	Northern Diamonds (Q)	6	4	2	0	0	1	17	0.655
2	Western Storm	6	4	2	0	0	1	17	0.182
3	North West Thunder	6	2	3	1	0	1	11	0.029
4	Sunrisers	6	1	4	1	0	0	6	−0.871

Source: ESPN Cricinfo
- Advanced to the semi-final

=== Fixtures ===
26 June 2021
14:30 BST
Scorecard

Western Storm; 129/6 (20 overs)	v	Sunrisers; 133/3 (17.5 overs)
Nat Wraith 36* (24); Sonali Patel 2/26 (4 overs)		Mady Villiers 36 (26); Danielle Gibson 1/20 (3 overs)

Sunrisers won by 7 wickets
County Ground, Taunton
Umpires: Mark Newell and Yvonne Dolphin-Cooper

- Sunrisers won the toss and elected to field.
- Points: Sunrisers 4, Western Storm 0

4 July 2021
11:00 BST
Scorecard

North West Thunder; 110/8 (20 overs)	v	Western Storm; 36/1 (3.1 overs)
Emma Lamb 21 (19); Lauren Parfitt 2/15 (4 overs)		Fi Morris 19 (8); Emma Lamb 1/11 (1 over)

Western Storm won by 9 wickets (DLS)
Chester Boughton Hall Cricket Club, Chester
Umpires: Anna Harris and Jasmine Naeem

- North West Thunder won the toss and elected to bat.
- Western Storm were set a revised target of 33 runs from 5 overs due to rain.
- Points: Western Storm 5, North West Thunder 0

10 July 2021
14:30 BST
Scorecard

Western Storm; 106/9 (20 overs)	v	Northern Diamonds; 110/9 (20 overs)
Katie George 21 (23); Alex MacDonald 4/17 (4 overs)		Jenny Gunn 27* (21); Danielle Gibson 2/9 (4 overs)

Northern Diamonds won by 1 wicket
County Ground, Taunton
Umpires: Anna Harris and Chris Watts

- Northern Diamonds won the toss and elected to field.
- Points: Northern Diamonds 4, Western Storm 0

25 August 2021
14:30 BST
Scorecard

North West Thunder; 100/9 (20 overs)	v	Western Storm; 101/3 (17.4 overs)
Emma Lamb 28 (20); Nicole Harvey 3/13 (4 overs)		Katie George 47* (46); Hannah Jones 1/22 (4 overs); Alex Hartley 1/22 (4 overs)

Western Storm won by 7 wickets
Sophia Gardens, Cardiff
Umpires: Anna Harris and Sue Redfern

- Western Storm won the toss and elected to field.
- Points: Western Storm 4, North West Thunder 0

28 August 2021
14:30 BST
Scorecard

Northern Diamonds; 110/9 (20 overs)	v	Western Storm; 111/6 (19.3 overs)
Alex MacDonald 22 (20); Nicole Harvey 2/20 (4 overs)		Sophie Luff 60* (54); Rachel Slater 2/16 (3 overs)

Western Storm won by 4 wickets
Riverside Ground, Chester-le-Street
Umpires: Jasmine Naeem and Neil Pratt

- Western Storm won the toss and elected to field.
- Points: Western Storm 4, Northern Diamonds 0

30 August 2021
14:30 BST
Scorecard

Western Storm; 147/5 (20 overs)	v	Sunrisers; 142/7 (20 overs)
Georgia Hennessy 62 (62); Grace Scrivens 2/23 (4 overs)		Cordelia Griffith 32 (25); Nicole Harvey 3/17 (4 overs)

Western Storm won by 5 runs
Fenner's, Cambridge
Umpires: Sarah Bartlett and Martin Saggers

- Sunrisers won the toss and elected to field.
- Points: Western Storm 4, Sunrisers 0

=== Tournament statistics ===
==== Batting ====
Player	Matches	Innings	Runs	Average	High score	100s	50s
Sophie Luff	6	5	127	31.75	60*	0	1
Georgia Hennessy	6	6	120	30.00	62	0	1
Katie George	5	4	87	29.00	47	0	0
Fi Morris	6	6	72	12.00	21	0	0
Nat Wraith	6	4	58	19.33	36	0	0

Source: ESPN Cricinfo Qualification: 50 runs.

==== Bowling ====
Player	Matches	Overs	Wickets	Average	Economy	BBI	5wi
Nicole Harvey	6	24.0	12	9.41	4.70	3/13	0
Danielle Gibson	6	19.0	7	15.28	5.63	2/9	0
Fi Morris	6	20.0	7	19.42	6.80	2/21	0

Source: ESPN Cricinfo Qualification: 5 wickets.

== Season statistics ==
=== Batting ===
Player	Rachael Heyhoe Flint Trophy								Charlotte Edwards Cup							
Player	Matches	Innings	Runs	High score	Average	Strike rate	100s	50s	Matches	Innings	Runs	High score	Average	Strike rate	100s	50s
Emma Corney	1	1	7	7	7.00	58.33	0	0	1	–	–	–	–	–	–	–
Emily Edgcombe	–	–	–	–	–	–	–	–	3	1	7	7	7.00	58.33	0	0
Lauren Filer	7	4	11	6*	11.00	52.38	0	0	4	–	–	–	–	–	–	–
Bethan Gammon	1	1	0	0	0.00	0.00	0	0	2	–	–	–	–	–	–	–
Katie George	1	1	37	37	37.00	61.66	0	0	5	4	87	47*	29.00	89.69	0	0
Danielle Gibson	7	7	100	29	16.66	109.89	0	0	6	6	46	15*	11.50	139.39	0	0
Alex Griffiths	3	3	121	55	40.33	82.87	0	0	6	4	26	11	6.50	83.87	0	0
Nicole Harvey	6	5	41	19*	20.50	70.68	0	0	6	1	4	4*	–	40.00	0	0
Georgia Hennessy	7	7	76	25	10.85	46.06	0	0	6	6	120	62	30.00	83.33	0	1
Steph Hutchins	1	1	0	0*	–	–	0	0	1	1	1	1*	–	33.33	0	0
Heather Knight	3	3	223	91	74.33	97.80	0	3	–	–	–	–	–	–	–	–
Sophie Luff	7	7	417	157*	69.50	79.73	1	3	6	5	127	60*	31.75	105.83	0	1
Fi Morris	7	7	169	32	24.14	78.60	0	0	6	6	72	21	12.00	112.50	0	0
Claire Nicholas	2	–	–	–	–	–	–	–	2	–	–	–	–	–	–	–
Lauren Parfitt	6	6	131	91	21.83	56.22	0	1	6	4	37	20*	37.00	94.87	0	0
Mollie Robbins	4	4	9	6	3.00	24.32	0	0	–	–	–	–	–	–	–	–
Joleigh Roberts	1	1	0	0	0.00	0.00	0	0	–	–	–	–	–	–	–	–
Anya Shrubsole	3	3	101	61*	50.50	138.35	0	1	–	–	–	–	–	–	–	–
Chloe Skelton	3	2	43	30	43.00	68.25	0	0	–	–	–	–	–	–	–	–
Nat Wraith	7	6	63	21	10.50	66.31	0	0	6	4	58	36*	19.33	116.00	0	0
Source: ESPN Cricinfo

=== Bowling ===
Player	Rachael Heyhoe Flint Trophy							Charlotte Edwards Cup						
Player	Matches	Overs	Wickets	Average	Economy	BBI	5wi	Matches	Overs	Wickets	Average	Economy	BBI	5wi
Emily Edgcombe	–	–	–	–	–	–	–	3	7.0	1	42.00	6.00	1/14	0
Lauren Filer	7	39.0	5	42.40	5.43	2/21	0	4	4.0	2	15.00	7.50	1/7	0
Danielle Gibson	7	38.0	3	87.00	6.86	2/56	0	6	19.0	7	15.28	5.63	2/9	0
Alex Griffiths	3	3.0	0	–	6.33	–	0	6	7.5	3	17.33	6.63	2/28	0
Nicole Harvey	6	39.2	6	29.83	4.55	2/25	0	6	24.0	12	9.41	4.70	3/13	0
Georgia Hennessy	7	57.0	9	31.22	4.92	3/57	0	6	14.0	2	42.50	6.07	1/7	0
Steph Hutchins	1	5.0	2	13.50	5.40	2/27	0	1	–	–	–	–	–	–
Heather Knight	3	13.0	1	90.00	6.92	1/30	0	–	–	–	–	–	–	–
Sophie Luff	7	2.0	0	–	8.00	–	0	6	–	–	–	–	–	–
Fi Morris	7	35.0	5	40.40	5.77	2/34	0	6	20.0	7	19.42	6.80	2/21	0
Claire Nicholas	2	15.3	3	27.33	5.29	2/60	0	2	6.0	2	21.00	7.00	1/16	0
Lauren Parfitt	6	2.1	0	–	7.84	–	0	6	16.0	3	27.66	5.18	2/15	0
Mollie Robbins	4	9.0	0	–	7.44	–	0	–	–	–	–	–	–	–
Joleigh Roberts	1	2.1	0	–	6.92	–	0	–	–	–	–	–	–	–
Anya Shrubsole	3	29.0	4	27.75	3.82	3/29	0	–	–	–	–	–	–	–
Chloe Skelton	3	5.5	0	–	6.00	–	0	–	–	–	–	–	–	–
Source: ESPN Cricinfo

=== Fielding ===
Player	Rachael Heyhoe Flint Trophy			Charlotte Edwards Cup		
Player	Matches	Innings	Catches	Matches	Innings	Catches
Emma Corney	1	1	0	1	1	1
Emily Edgcombe	–	–	–	3	3	1
Lauren Filer	7	7	3	4	4	0
Bethan Gammon	1	1	0	2	2	0
Katie George	1	1	0	5	5	3
Danielle Gibson	7	7	2	6	6	5
Alex Griffiths	3	3	0	6	6	0
Nicole Harvey	6	6	1	6	6	2
Georgia Hennessy	7	7	2	6	6	1
Steph Hutchins	1	1	0	1	1	0
Heather Knight	3	3	1	–	–	–
Sophie Luff	7	7	2	6	6	1
Fi Morris	7	7	0	6	6	3
Claire Nicholas	2	2	1	2	2	0
Lauren Parfitt	6	6	1	6	6	1
Mollie Robbins	4	4	1	–	–	–
Joleigh Roberts	1	1	0	–	–	–
Anya Shrubsole	3	3	0	–	–	–
Chloe Skelton	3	3	0	–	–	–
Source: ESPN Cricinfo

=== Wicket-keeping ===
Player	Rachael Heyhoe Flint Trophy				Charlotte Edwards Cup			
Player	Matches	Innings	Catches	Stumpings	Matches	Innings	Catches	Stumpings
Nat Wraith	7	7	6	4	6	6	4	2
Source: ESPN Cricinfo
