= Piepa Cleary =

Australian cricketer (born 1996)

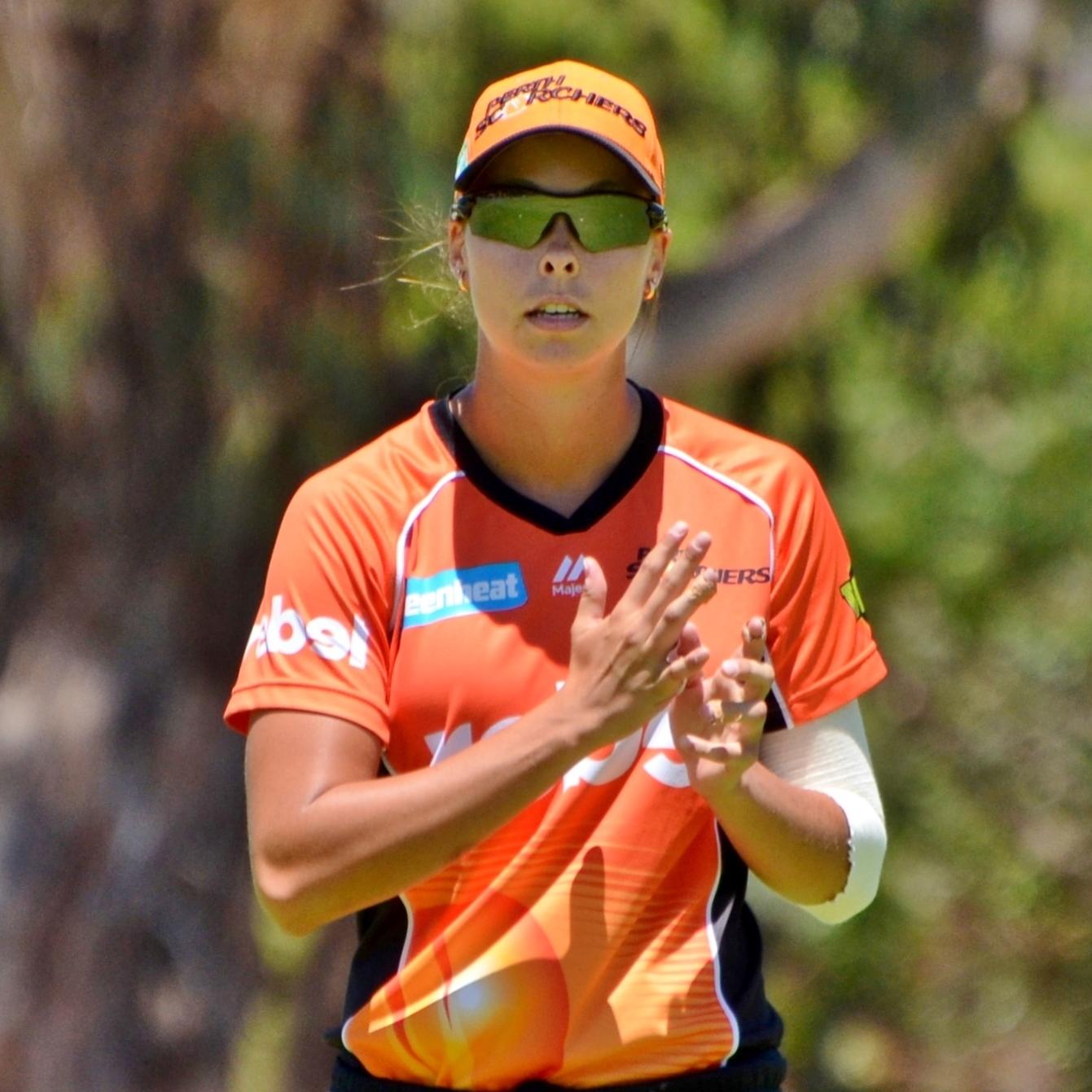
- Cleary fielding for Perth Scorchers in January 2017

Personal information
- Full name: Piepa May Cleary
- Born: 17 July 1996 (age 30); Subiaco, Perth, Western Australia
- Height: 1.79 m (5 ft 10 in)
- Batting: Right-handed
- Bowling: Right-arm medium-fast
- Role: Bowler

Domestic team information
- Years: Team
- 2012/13–2026: Western Australia
- 2015/16–2025: Perth Scorchers
- 2021: Lancashire
- 2021: North West Thunder
- 2021: Welsh Fire
- 2022: Lightning
- 2023–2025: Leicestershire
- 2023: Western Storm

Career statistics
Competition	WLA	WT20
Matches	75	109
Runs scored	610	309
Batting average	15.93	9.68
100s/50s	0/0	0/1
Top score	42*	79
Balls bowled	2,758	2,141
Wickets	59	91
Bowling average	40.68	26.24
5 wickets in innings	0	0
10 wickets in match	0	0
Best bowling	4/49	3/16
Catches/stumpings	16/–	26/–
- Source: CricketArchive, 23 March 2022

Piepa May Cleary (born 17 July 1996) is an Australian former professional cricketer.

== Career ==
The right-arm bowler was selected in the 2011 Australian under-18 Talent Camp as a 15-year old after taking eight wickets at the 2010-11 under-18 National Championships.

As a teenager, Cleary was also part of Australia's under-19 girls team at the 2011 Indoor Cricket Juniors World Series, before captaining the under-16s to glory in 2012. The South Perth product picked up 12 wickets during that tournament.

She took 12 wickets in 14 games during the 2013–14 WNCL season after debuting in December 2012.

She travelled to Dubai with the Commonwealth Bank Shooting Stars to play an England Academy team in April 2015 and has signed with the Perth Scorchers in the WBBL.

She is part of the current Shooting Stars squad, and was selected in the Cricket Australia Governor-General's XI to face South Africa. The opening bowler played in every WNCL match for Western Australia in the 2016–2017 season in the lead up to season two of the WBBL.

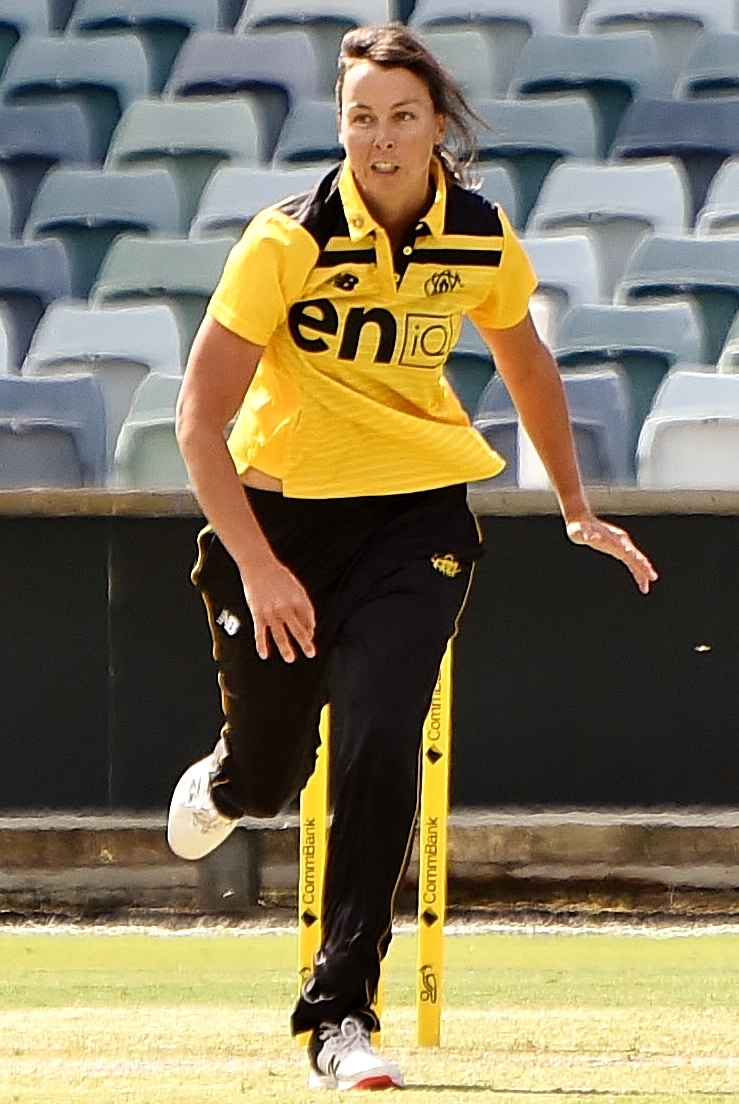
Cleary bowling for Western Australia in September 2022

In February 2016 Cleary was suspended for six months under Cricket Australia's Anti-Corruption Code for placing bets on cricket matches totalling $15.50.

Cleary was named in Australia's extended squad for the 2017 ICC Women's World Cup.

In August 2017 Cleary and another seven other promising young cricket players were named in the Inaugural Women's National Performance squad. The squad trained at the world-class NCC facility and alongside the Australian contracted squad at a pre-Ashes camp.

In November 2018, she was named in the Perth Scorchers' squad for the 2018–19 Women's Big Bash League season. In 2021, she was drafted by Welsh Fire for the inaugural season of The Hundred. She played for them in 8 games and picked up 6 wickets.

In April 2021, it was announced that Cleary had joined Lancashire and North West Thunder for the 2021 season. For some years, Cleary had been in a long-distance relationship with Amy Jones, her former Perth Scorchers teammate, who bats and keeps wicket for England. She and Jones are now both based in Loughborough, Leicestershire. Cleary had also wanted to take a break from playing for Western Australia. However, she returned to play for Western Australia in the 2021–22 Women's National Cricket League. She joined Leicestershire for the 2023 East of England Women's County Championship, becoming the side's first ever overseas player. In July 2023, she signed for Western Storm for three Rachael Heyhoe Flint Trophy matches.

Cleary announced her retirement from professional cricket in January 2026.

== Personal life ==
Cleary married English international cricketer Amy Jones on 4 April 2026.
