= Rebecca Odgers =

English cricketer

Personal information
- Full name: Rebecca Niamh Odgers
- Born: 10 February 2003 (age 23)
- Batting: Right-handed
- Bowling: Right-arm off break
- Role: Batter; occasional wicket-keeper

Domestic team information
- Years: Team
- 2018–2024: Cornwall
- 2019: → Somerset (on loan)
- 2023: Western Storm
- 2025–present: Somerset

Career statistics
Competition	WLA	WT20
Matches	13	23
Runs scored	358	308
Batting average	35.80	16.21
100s/50s	122	0/0
Top score	1/1	47
Balls bowled	156	187
Wickets	5	9
Bowling average	21.60	15.11
5 wickets in innings	0	0
10 wickets in match	0	0
Best bowling	3/35	2/7
Catches/stumpings	2/–	6/1
- Source: CricketArchive, 21 October 2023

Rebecca Niamh Odgers (born 10 February 2003) is an English cricketer who currently plays for Somerset. She plays primarily as a right-handed batter and occasional wicket-keeper.

== Early life ==
Odgers was born on 10 February 2003 and grew up in St Austell, Cornwall. She studies medical sciences at the University of Exeter.

== Domestic career ==
Odgers made her county debut in 2018, for Cornwall against the Netherlands, in which she made 39. In her second match for the side, she hit her maiden List A century, scoring 122 from 97 deliveries against Dorset. She went on to be the side's second-highest run-scorer in the Women's County Championship that season, with 240 runs at an average of 48.00. In 2019 for Cornwall, she scored 118 runs at an average of 29.50 in the Women's County Championship and 106 runs at an average of 17.66 in the Women's Twenty20 Cup. She also appeared in one match for Somerset, against Devon. In July 2019, she played two matches for England Academy. She was Cornwall's leading run-scorer in the 2021 Women's Twenty20 Cup, with 73 runs in four matches.

Odgers was named in Western Storm's first Academy squad in 2021, and was retained on the programme in 2022 and 2023. In May 2022, she scored a century for the academy side against Wiltshire. She was included in Western Storm's senior squad for the first time in 2023. She made her debut for the side on 4 June 2023, against Central Sparks in the Charlotte Edwards Cup.
