= Isobel Patel =

English cricketer

Personal information
- Full name: Isobel Patel
- Born: 21 November 2004 (age 21); Bristol, England
- Batting: Right-handed
- Bowling: Right-arm medium
- Role: All-rounder

Domestic team information
- Years: Team
- 2021–present: Gloucestershire
- 2023: Western Storm

Career statistics
Competition	WLA	WT20
Matches	1	5
Runs scored	1	–
Batting average	–	–
100s/50s	0/0	–
Top score	1*	–
Balls bowled	30	12
Wickets	0	0
Bowling average	–	–
5 wickets in innings	0	0
10 wickets in match	0	0
Best bowling	–	–
Catches/stumpings	0/–	0/–
- Source: CricketArchive, 17 October 2023

Isobel Patel (born 21 November 2004) is an English cricketer who currently plays for Gloucestershire. She plays as a right-handed batter and a right-arm medium bowler.

== Domestic career ==
Patel made her county debut in 2021, for Gloucestershire against Cornwall. She went on to play five matches overall for the side in the 2021 Women's Twenty20 Cup.

Patel was named in the Western Storm Academy for 2023. Ahead of the 2023 season, she was also included in the side's senior squad. She made her debut for the side on 16 September 2023, against North West Thunder in the Rachael Heyhoe Flint Trophy.
