= Gemma Lane =

English cricketer (born 2003)

Personal information
- Full name: Gemma Lucy Lane
- Born: 13 May 2003 (age 23); Frimley, Surrey, England
- Batting: Right-handed
- Bowling: Right-arm medium
- Role: Bowler

Domestic team information
- Years: Team
- 2021–present: Hampshire
- 2021–2022: Southern Vipers
- 2023–2024: Western Storm

Career statistics
Competition	WLA	WT20
Matches	6	27
Runs scored	11	27
Batting average	5.50	5.40
100s/50s	0/0	0/0
Top score	5*	10*
Balls bowled	175	372
Wickets	2	19
Bowling average	86.00	18.52
5 wickets in innings	0	0
10 wickets in match	0	0
Best bowling	1/34	2/5
Catches/stumpings	0/–	10/–
- Source: CricketArchive, 19 October 2024

Gemma Lucy Lane (born 13 May 2003) is an English cricketer who currently plays for Hampshire. She plays as a right-arm medium bowler.

== Early life ==
Lane was born on 13 May 2003 in Frimley, Surrey.

== Domestic career ==
Lane made her county debut in 2021, for Hampshire against Middlesex in the Women's Twenty20 Cup. She went on to play five further matches for the side in the tournament, taking three wickets at an average of 24.66. She played seven matches in the 2022 Women's Twenty20 Cup, taking two wickets. She took six wickets for the side in the 2023 Women's Twenty20 Cup, at an average of 10.16.

Lane was named in the Southern Vipers squad for the 2021 season, but did not play a match. She was not initially named in the side's squad for the 2022 season, but was first named in a matchday squad for the Vipers' match against Lightning on 16 July. In September 2023, she joined Western Storm on a pay as you play contract. She made her debut for the side on 5 September 2023, against Sunrisers in the Rachael Heyhoe Flint Trophy. She played four matches overall for the side that season.
