= Sophia Smale =

Welsh cricketer

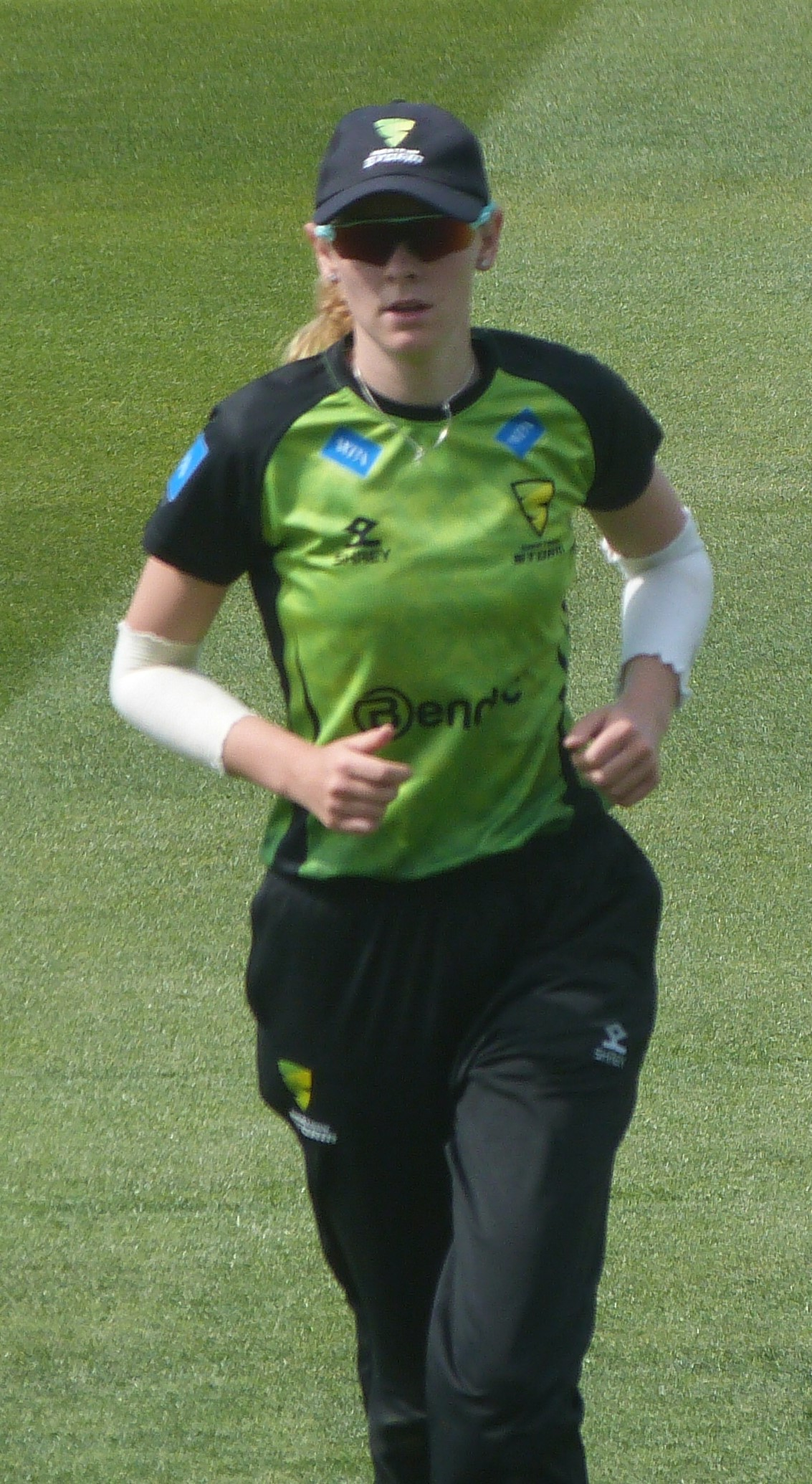
- Smale fielding for Western Storm in May 2023

Personal information
- Full name: Sophia Ann Elizabeth Smale
- Born: 8 December 2004 (age 21); Newport, Wales
- Batting: Right-handed
- Bowling: Slow left-arm orthodox
- Role: All-rounder
- Relatives: Will Smale (brother)

Domestic team information
- Years: Team
- 2021–present: Wales
- 2022–2025: Western Storm
- 2022–2025: Oval Invincibles
- 2025–present: Essex
- 2026–present: Welsh Fire

Career statistics
Competition	WLA	WT20
Matches	32	59
Runs scored	550	180
Batting average	22.91	10.00
100s/50s	0/3	0/0
Top score	59	34
Balls bowled	1,450	1,060
Wickets	27	48
Bowling average	42.07	24.67
5 wickets in innings	0	0
10 wickets in match	0	0
Best bowling	4/34	3/15
Catches/stumpings	14/–	21/–
- Source: CricketArchive, 19 October 2024

Sophia Ann Elizabeth Smale (born 8 December 2004) is a Welsh cricketer who currently plays for Wales and Welsh Fire. She plays as a slow left-arm orthodox bowler and right-handed batter.

== Early life ==
Smale was born on 8 December 2004 in Newport. She attends Haberdashers' Monmouth School for Girls, and plays club cricket for Newport Cricket Club. She has also played hockey for Wales at age group level.

== Domestic career ==
Smale made her county debut in 2021, for Wales against Warwickshire in the Women's Twenty20 Cup. She played four matches for the side in the competition, scoring 47 runs and taking 1 wicket. She was ever-present for the side in the 2022 Women's Twenty20 Cup, playing 7 matches and taking 5 wickets. She took three wickets in four matches in the 2023 Women's Twenty20 Cup.

Smale was named in the Western Storm Academy squad for 2021. She scored 83 from 77 balls in a 50-over match against North West Thunder Academy in June 2021. She was again named in the Storm Academy for the 2022 season, but was promoted to the first team squad in May 2022. She made her debut for the side on 18 May 2022, against Sunrisers in the Charlotte Edwards Cup. She went on to play the rest of the Charlotte Edwards Cup campaign for the side, taking four wickets at an average of 28.00. She was also ever-present for the side in the Rachael Heyhoe Flint Trophy, taking two wickets, as well as scoring 133 runs at an average of 44.33. She scored her maiden half-century during the Rachael Heyhoe Flint Trophy, scoring 59 against Northern Diamonds.

In July 2022, Smale signed for Oval Invincibles for the 2022 season of The Hundred, as an injury replacement player for Emma Jones. She played all seven matches for the side as they won the competition, and she was the side's joint-leading wicket-taker, with eight wickets at an average of 18.25. During the tournament, she was named as the "summer's breakout star", citing her dismissals of players such as Alyssa Healy and Sophie Devine during The Hundred. At the end of the 2022 season, it was announced that Smale had signed her first professional contract with Western Storm.

In 2023, she played 19 matches for Western Storm, across the Rachael Heyhoe Flint Trophy and the Charlotte Edwards Cup, and was the side's second-highest wicket-taker in the Rachael Heyhoe Flint Trophy, with 12 wickets at an average of 28.66. She also scored one half-century, with 56 against North West Thunder. She also played seven matches for Oval Invincibles in The Hundred, taking five wickets at an average of 21.60. In 2024, she played 23 matches for Western Storm, across the Rachael Heyhoe Flint Trophy and the Charlotte Edwards Cup, scoring one half-century and taking 23 wickets.

In October 2024, she signed for Essex Women ahead of the 2025 women's domestic cricket restructure.

== International career ==
In October 2022, Smale was selected in the England Under-19 squad for the 2023 ICC Under-19 Women's T20 World Cup. She took eight wickets at an average of 9.62 at the tournament, including best bowling figures of 3/11, taken against Ireland.

== Personal life ==
Smale's brother Will is also a professional cricketer, currently playing for Glamorgan.
