= Emma Corney =

English cricketer

Personal information
- Full name: Emma Victoria Corney
- Born: 15 September 2003 (age 23)
- Batting: Right-handed
- Bowling: Right-arm medium
- Role: Batter

Domestic team information
- Years: Team
- 2019–2024: Devon
- 2020–2024: Western Storm
- 2025: Somerset (squad no. 21)

Career statistics
Competition	WLA	WT20
Matches	34	27
Runs scored	714	662
Batting average	22.50	31.52
100s/50s	0/4	0/2
Top score	82	64
Balls bowled	138	36
Wickets	2	2
Bowling average	57.00	11.50
5 wickets in innings	0	0
10 wickets in match	0	0
Best bowling	1/16	2/15
Catches/stumpings	3/–	4/–
- Source: CricketArchive, 19 October 2024

Emma Victoria Corney (born 15 September 2003) is an English cricketer who currently plays for Somerset. A right-handed batter she also bowls right-arm medium.

== Early life ==
Corney was born on 15 September 2003. Her hometown is Exmouth, Devon.

== Domestic career ==
Corney made her county debut for Devon in 2019, against Wales. In her fourth match, she hit her maiden county half-century, scoring 55 against Middlesex. She was Devon's leading run-scorer in the 2021 Women's Twenty20 Cup, with 165 runs including her Twenty20 high score of 44, as well as taking 2 wickets.

In 2020, Corney played for Western Storm in the Rachael Heyhoe Flint Trophy. She appeared in all six matches, taking two wickets with a best of 1/16 against Sunrisers. She played two matches for the side in 2021, as well as being part of the Academy squad throughout the season. In 2022, she played two matches for Western Storm, both in the Rachael Heyhoe Flint Trophy, scoring 52 runs in two innings.

In April 2023, it was announced that Corney had signed her first professional contract with Western Storm. She played 13 matches for the side that season, across the Rachael Heyhoe Flint Trophy and the Charlotte Edwards Cup, and was the side's second-highest run-scorer in the Rachael Heyhoe Flint Trophy, with 296 runs including two half-centuries. In 2024, she played 15 matches for Western Storm, across the Rachael Heyhoe Flint Trophy and the Charlotte Edwards Cup, with a high score of 46.
