= Nat Wraith =

English cricketer

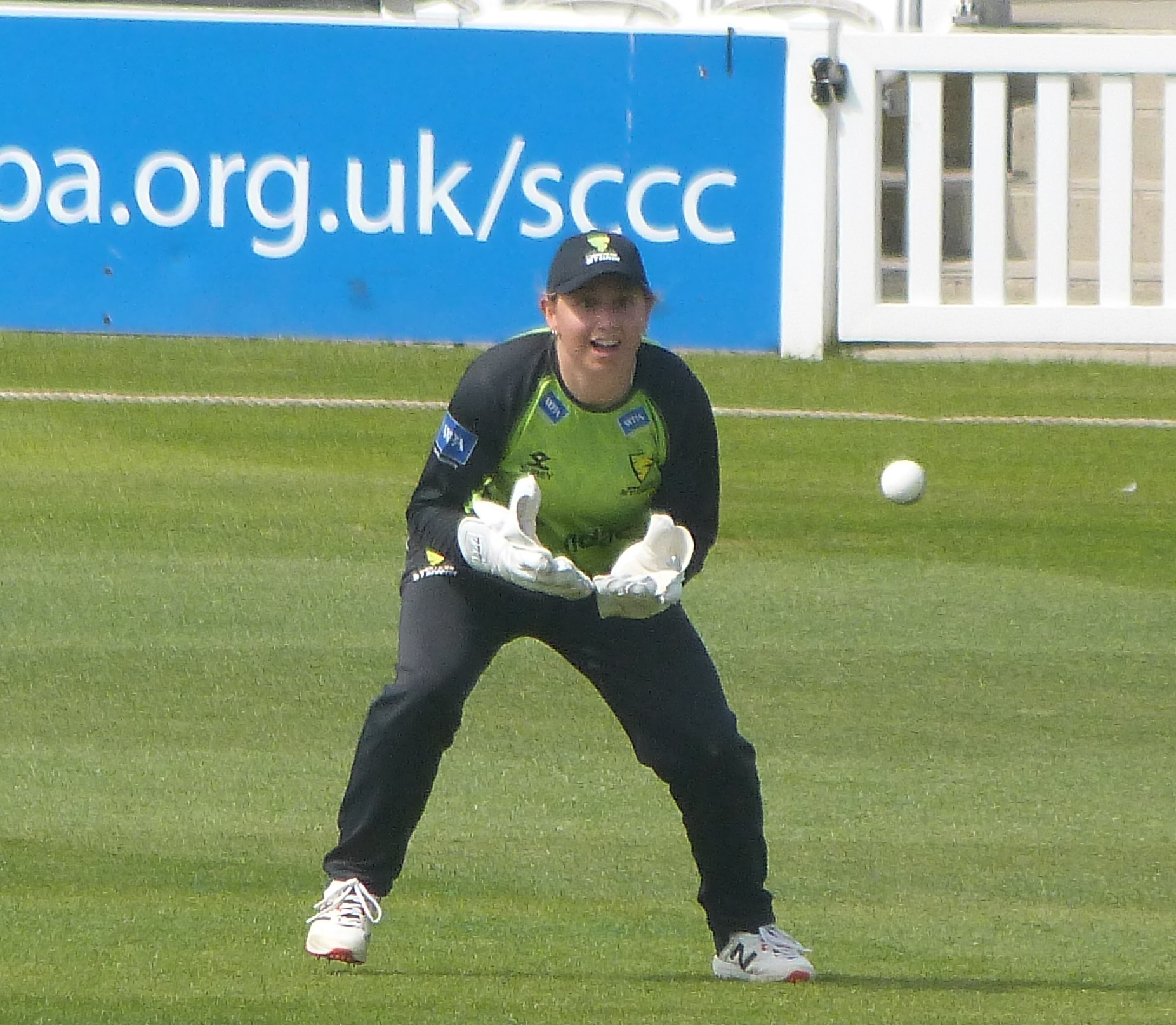
- Wraith keeping-wicket for Western Storm in May 2023

Personal information
- Full name: Natasha Agnes Jessica Wraith
- Born: 3 October 2001 (age 25); Bristol, England
- Batting: Right-handed
- Role: Wicket-keeper

Domestic team information
- Years: Team
- 2016–2018: Gloucestershire
- 2019–2024: Somerset
- 2019–2024: Western Storm
- 2021: Welsh Fire
- 2022: London Spirit
- 2023–present: Trent Rockets
- 2025–present: Warwickshire

Career statistics
Competition	WLA	WT20
Matches	63	79
Runs scored	1,193	812
Batting average	23.39	14.76
100s/50s	0/5	0/1
Top score	73	74*
Catches/stumpings	40/17	20/34
- Source: CricketArchive, 19 October 2024

Natasha Agnes Jessica Wraith (born 3 October 2001) is an English cricketer who currently plays for Warwickshire and Trent Rockets. She plays as a wicket-keeper and right-handed batter. She has previously played for Gloucestershire, Somerset, Western Storm, Welsh Fire and London Spirit.

== Early life ==
Wraith was born on 3 October 2001 in Bristol. She has also worked as a tennis coach.

== Domestic career ==
Wraith made her county debut in 2016, for Gloucestershire against Dorset. She did not bat, but kept wicket and took one catch. The following season, she helped her side gain promotion from Division 3A in the Twenty20 Cup.

Wraith joined Somerset ahead of the 2019 season and hit her maiden county half-century in the 2019 Women's County Championship, scoring 53 against Durham. She also made 10 stumpings in the Twenty20 Cup, the most across the whole competition. She scored 56 runs in 4 matches for Somerset in the 2021 Women's Twenty20 Cup as her side won the West Midlands Group of the competition. She was Somerset's second-highest run-scorer in the 2022 Women's Twenty20 Cup, with 143 runs including her maiden Twenty20 half-century, scoring 74* from 49 deliveries against Wales. She played two matches in the 2023 Women's Twenty20 Cup, scoring 84 runs.

Wraith also joined the Western Storm squad for the 2019 Women's Cricket Super League as an injury-replacement for Amara Carr, but did not play a match.

In 2020, Wraith was retained in the Western Storm squad for the Rachael Heyhoe Flint Trophy. She appeared in all six matches, scoring 111 runs at an average of 22.20 and taking 4 stumpings and 1 catch. She achieved her List A high score of 68 in a match against Southern Vipers. In December 2020, it was announced that Wraith was one of the 41 female cricketers that had signed a full-time domestic contract. She was ever-present for the side again in the 2021 season, scoring 63 runs in the Rachael Heyhoe Flint Trophy and 58 runs in the Charlotte Edwards Cup. She had the joint-most dismissals in the Rachael Heyhoe Flint Trophy, with 10 dismissals, and the most in the Charlotte Edwards Cup, with 6 dismissals. In The Hundred, Wraith played for Welsh Fire, appearing in one match and scoring 3*. She again played every match for Western Storm in 2022, scoring 137 runs and making 10 dismissals. She also moved to London Spirit in The Hundred, playing two matches for her new side.

In 2023, she played 17 matches for Western Storm, across the Rachael Heyhoe Flint Trophy and the Charlotte Edwards Cup, making one half-century and ten dismissals. She was also signed by Trent Rockets for The Hundred, but did not play a match. In 2024, she played 23 matches for Western Storm, across the Rachael Heyhoe Flint Trophy and the Charlotte Edwards Cup, and scored 428 runs at an average of 35.66 including two half-centuries in the Rachael Heyhoe Flint Trophy.

Wraith began playing for the England Academy in 2019.
