= Lauren Filer =

English cricketer

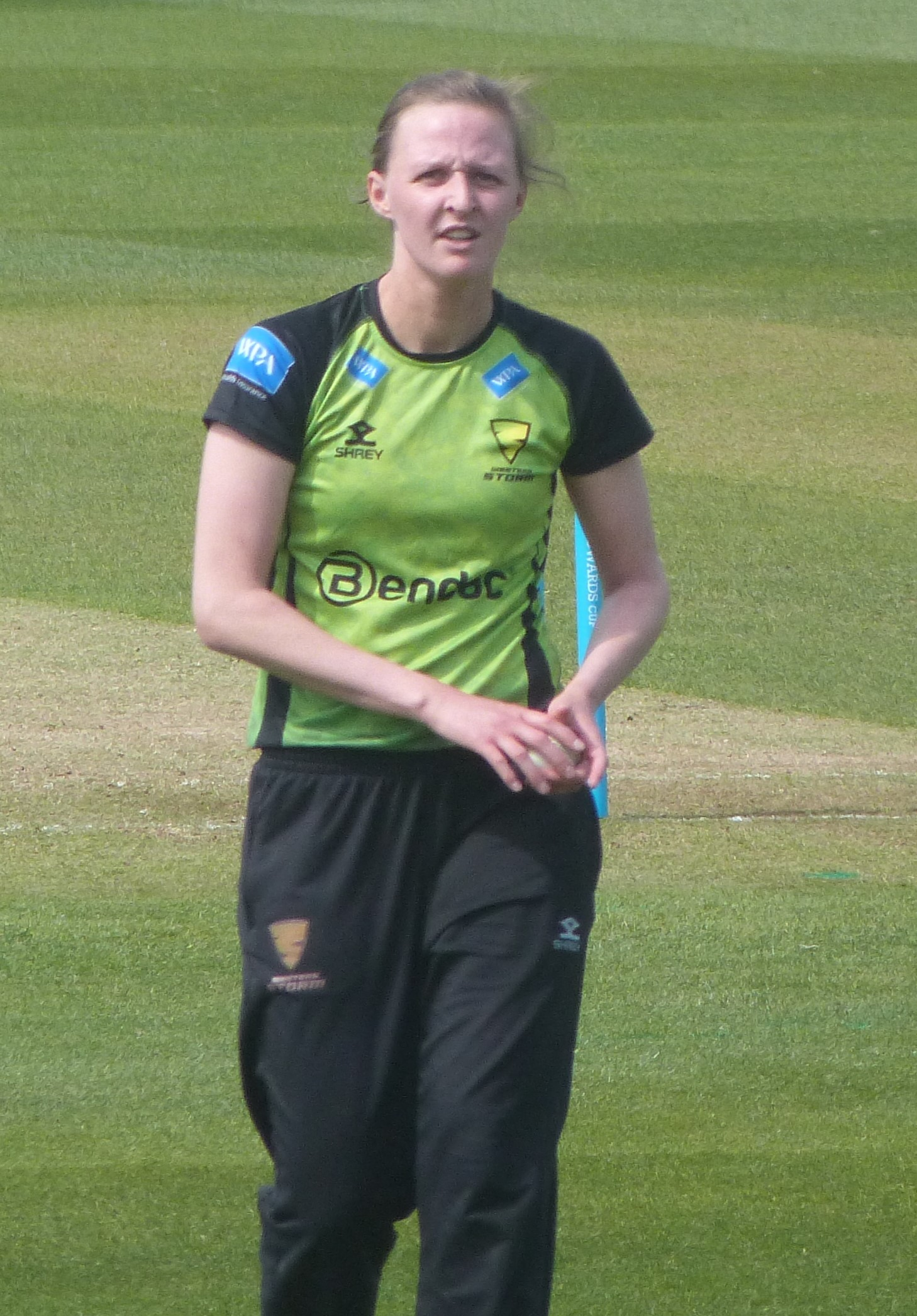
- Filer bowling for Western Storm in May 2023

Personal information
- Full name: Lauren Louise Filer
- Born: 22 December 2000 (age 25); Bristol, England
- Batting: Right-handed
- Bowling: Right-arm fast
- Role: Bowler

International information
- National side: England (2023–present)
- Test debut (cap 167): 22 June 2023 v Australia
- Last Test: 10 July 2026 v India
- ODI debut (cap 143): 9 September 2023 v Sri Lanka
- Last ODI: 14 September 2023 v Sri Lanka
- ODI shirt no.: 82
- T20I debut (cap 61): 19 March 2024 v New Zealand
- Last T20I: 11 July 2024 v New Zealand
- T20I shirt no.: 82

Domestic team information
- Years: Team
- 2018–2022: Somerset
- 2020–2024: Western Storm
- 2022: Welsh Fire
- 2023: London Spirit
- 2024–2025: Manchester Originals
- 2025–present: Durham
- 2026: Birmingham Phoenix

Career statistics
Competition	WTest	WODI	WT20I	WLA
Matches	4	18	12	54
Runs scored	41	24	8	164
Batting average	5.85	6.00	2.66	8.63
100s/50s	0/0	0/0	0/0	0/1
Top score	14	8*	4*	58*
Balls bowled	588	719	246	2,071
Wickets	9	28	8	64
Bowling average	44.00	22.39	39.00	28.34
5 wickets in innings	0	0	0	0
10 wickets in match	0	0	0	0
Best bowling	2/49	3/10	2/17	3/10
Catches/stumpings	1/–	3/–	4/–	10/–
Medal record
Women's cricket
Representing England
T20 World Cup
Runner-up	2026 England
- Source: CricketArchive, 23 July 2025

Lauren Louise Filer (born 22 December 2000) is an English cricketer who currently plays for Durham and Manchester Originals. She plays as a right-arm fast bowler. She has previously played for Somerset, Western Storm, Welsh Fire and London Spirit.

She made her international debut for England in June 2023, in a Test match against Australia.

== Early life ==
Filer was born on 22 December 2000 in Bristol. Her twin sister, Jodie, has played for Somerset alongside her.

== Domestic career ==
Filer made her debut for Somerset in 2018 against Nottinghamshire, taking one wicket. She achieved her best List A bowling figures in 2019, taking 3/21 against Essex. She appeared in one match for Somerset as they won the West Midlands Group of the 2021 Women's Twenty20 Cup. In the 2022 Women's Twenty20 Cup, she took five wickets in five matches for Somerset, at an average of 8.80.

In 2020, Filer played for Western Storm in the Rachael Heyhoe Flint Trophy. She appeared in 3 matches, taking 3 wickets at an average of 23.33, including taking 2/24 against Sunrisers. The following season, she appeared in all seven matches for Western Storm in the Rachael Heyhoe Flint Trophy, taking five wickets at an average of 42.40. She also played four matches in the Charlotte Edwards Cup, taking two wickets. She also signed to play for Welsh Fire in The Hundred, but did not play a match. In 2022, she played eight matches for Western Storm, across the Charlotte Edwards Cup and the Rachael Heyhoe Flint Trophy. In the Rachael Heyhoe Flint Trophy, she was the side's leading wicket-taker, with 11 wickets at an average of 22.63, and hit her maiden half-century, scoring 58* against Central Sparks. She was also ever-present for Welsh Fire in The Hundred, taking two wickets in six matches. At the end of the 2022 season, it was announced that Filer had signed her first professional contract with Western Storm.

In 2023, she played 11 matches for Western Storm, across the Rachael Heyhoe Flint Trophy and the Charlotte Edwards Cup, taking 13 wickets. She also played six matches for London Spirit in The Hundred, taking two wickets. In 2024, she played eight matches for Western Storm, across the Rachael Heyhoe Flint Trophy and the Charlotte Edwards Cup, taking nine wickets.

== International career ==
In June 2023, Filer was named in an England squad for the first time, being called up for the side's Test match against Australia. She made her Test debut in that match, on 22 June 2023. She took four wickets on debut, two in each innings. She was later named in the ODI squad in the same series, but did not play a match. Later that summer, she was named in England's squad for their series against Sri Lanka. She made her One Day International debut during the 1st ODI of the series, taking 3/27. She took eight wickets overall in the three-match series, and was subsequently named Player of the Series. In December 2023, she was awarded a development contract by the England and Wales Cricket Board. She played her second Test match for England on the side's tour of India in December 2023, but did not take a wicket.

In February 2024, she was selected to the England's T20I squad for the series against New Zealand. She made her Twenty20 International debut in the 1st T20I of the series on 19 March 2024.

Filer was named in England's squad for their multi-format tour to South Africa in November 2024 and the following month was included in the party for the 2025 Women's Ashes series in Australia.
