= Chloe Skelton =

English cricketer

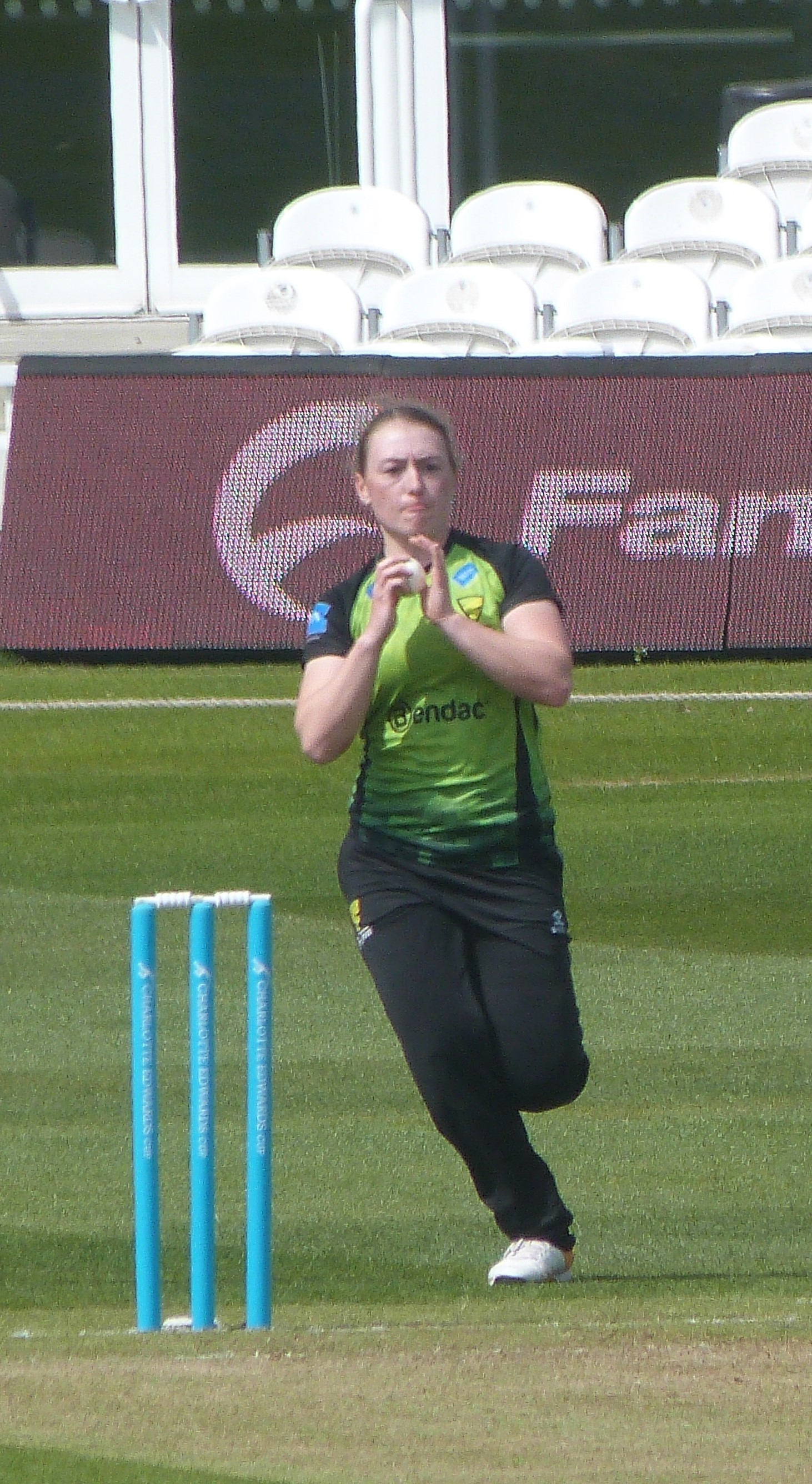
- Skelton bowling for Western Storm in May 2023

Personal information
- Full name: Chloe Nadine Skelton
- Born: 20 June 2001 (age 25)
- Batting: Right-handed
- Bowling: Right-arm off break
- Role: Bowling all-rounder

Domestic team information
- Years: Team
- 2018–2024: Gloucestershire
- 2021–2024: Western Storm
- 2023: Welsh Fire
- 2025: Somerset

Career statistics
Competition	WLA	WT20
Matches	47	46
Runs scored	567	511
Batting average	28.35	17.62
100s/50s	1/1	0/1
Top score	134*	70*
Balls bowled	1,544	573
Wickets	45	29
Bowling average	27.22	20.44
5 wickets in innings	2	0
10 wickets in match	0	0
Best bowling	5/29	4/24
Catches/stumpings	10/–	15/–
- Source: CricketArchive, 19 October 2024

Chloe Nadine Skelton (born 20 June 2001) is an English cricketer who most recently played for Gloucestershire, Western Storm and Welsh Fire. She plays as a right-arm off break bowler and right-handed batter.

== Domestic career ==
Skelton made her county debut in 2018, for Gloucestershire against Oxfordshire. In her second match, Skelton made 134* from 143 balls in a 228-run victory for her side against Buckinghamshire. In 2019, Skelton was Gloucestershire's leading run-scorer in the County Championship, with 103 runs at an average of 25.75. In 2021, Skelton was the fifth-highest run-scorer across the whole competition in the Twenty20 Cup, with 201 runs at an average of 67.00, including 70* made against Cornwall. In the 2022 Women's Twenty20 Cup, she was Gloucestershire's leading wicket-taker, with 7 wickets including her Twenty20 best bowling figures of 4/24 taken against Warwickshire, as well as scoring 98 runs.

In February 2021, Skelton was named in the Western Storm Academy for the upcoming season. She scored 109 for the academy in a match against Lightning Academy in July 2021. In September 2021, Skelton was added to the full Western Storm squad, and made her debut for the side on 10 September, against Northern Diamonds in the Rachael Heyhoe Flint Trophy, scoring 30 from 51 balls. She went on to play two more matches for the side that season, batting once more, scoring 13* against Lightning. She played four matches for Western Storm in 2022, all in the Rachael Heyhoe Flint Trophy, and was the side's second-highest wicket-taker in the tournament, with 10 wickets at an average of 17.20. Against South East Stars, Skelton took her maiden five-wicket haul, returning figures of 5/54 from her 10 overs. At the end of the 2022 season, it was announced that Skelton had signed her first professional contract with Western Storm.

In 2023, she played 20 matches for Western Storm, across the Rachael Heyhoe Flint Trophy and the Charlotte Edwards Cup, and was the side's leading wicket-taker in the Rachael Heyhoe Flint Trophy, with 14 wickets at an average of 31.28. She was also signed by Welsh Fire for The Hundred, but did not play a match. In 2024, she played 23 matches for Western Storm, across the Rachael Heyhoe Flint Trophy and the Charlotte Edwards Cup, taking 21 wickets with best bowling figures of 5/29.
