= Mollie Robbins =

English cricketer

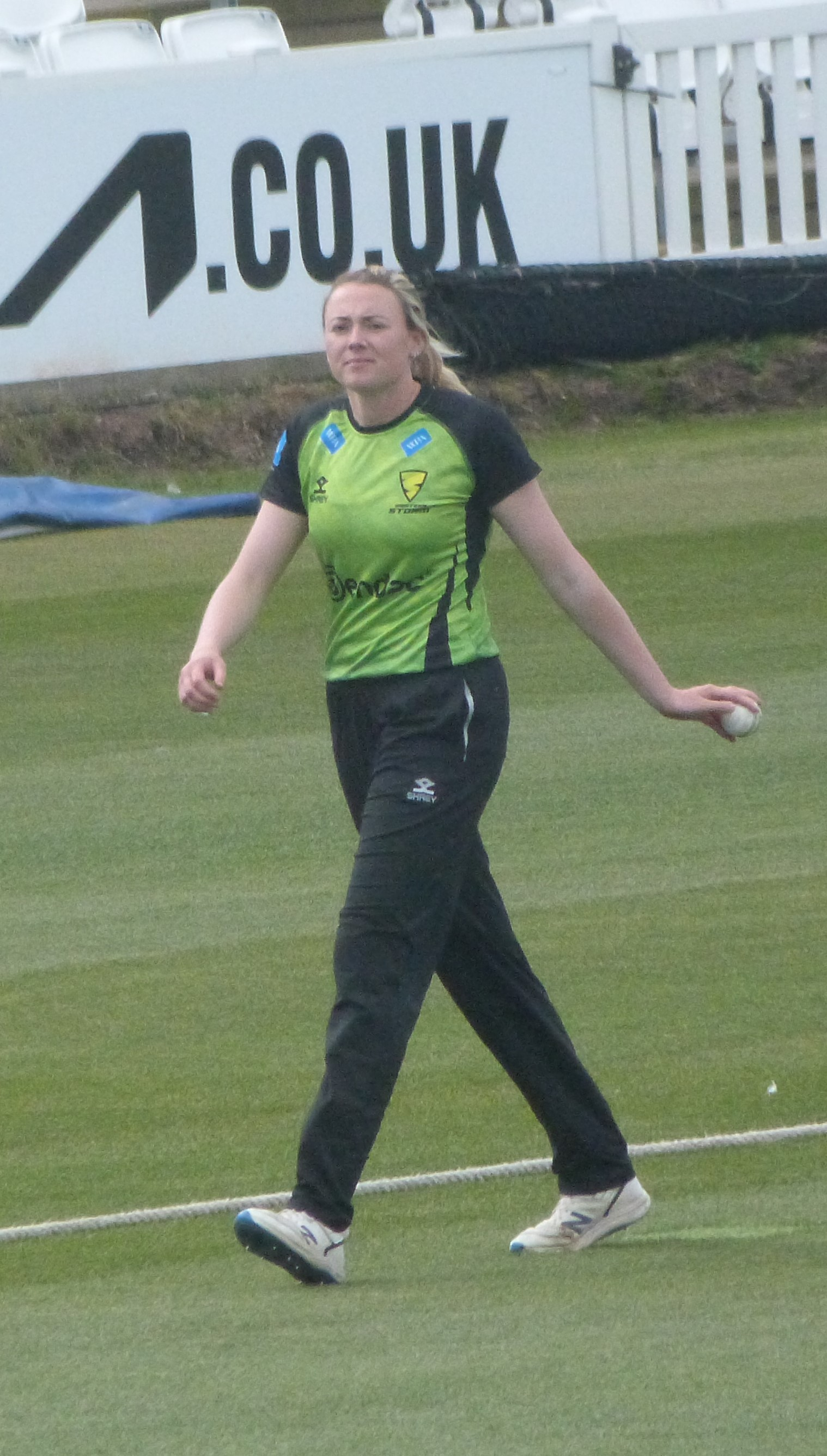
- Robbins warming-up for Western Storm in May 2023

Personal information
- Full name: Mollie Joy Robbins
- Born: 4 October 1998 (age 28); Bristol, England
- Batting: Right-handed
- Bowling: Right-arm medium
- Role: Bowler

Domestic team information
- Years: Team
- 2013–2024: Gloucestershire
- 2021–2024: Western Storm

Career statistics
Competition	WLA	WT20
Matches	39	44
Runs scored	69	257
Batting average	4.60	12.23
100s/50s	0/0	0/0
Top score	12*	47
Balls bowled	1,283	658
Wickets	47	22
Bowling average	18.97	21.90
5 wickets in innings	1	0
10 wickets in match	0	0
Best bowling	5/19	2/3
Catches/stumpings	7/–	8/–
- Source: CricketArchive, 19 October 2024

Mollie Joy Robbins (born 4 October 1998) is an English cricketer who most recently played for Gloucestershire and Western Storm. She plays as a right-arm medium bowler.

== Early and personal life ==
Robbins was born on 4 October 1998 in Bristol. In 2022, she was appointed Head Coach of Thornbury Cricket Club's women's team.

== Domestic career ==
Robbins made her county debut in 2013, for Gloucestershire against Derbyshire. The following season, 2014, she was Gloucestershire's joint-leading wicket-taker in the County Championship, with 6 wickets at an average of 14.83. Robbins soon became a regular in Gloucestershire's side, with strong seasons coming in the 2016 and 2017 Championships, where she took 7 wickets in each season, including a best bowling of 4/2 in a 2017 match against Wiltshire. In the 2019 Women's County Championship, Robbins took 14 wickets, the second-highest tally across the whole competition, including her maiden five-wicket haul, 5/19 against Dorset. She also achieved her T20 high score that season, scoring 47 from 40 balls against Wiltshire. In 2021, she helped her side to winning the South West Group of the Twenty20 Cup, taking 2 wickets and scoring 41 runs. She took four wickets at an average of 30.00 in the 2022 Women's Twenty20 Cup.

In 2021, Robbins was selected in the Western Storm squad for their upcoming season. She played four matches for the side in the Rachael Heyhoe Flint Trophy, without taking a wicket. She was again in the Western Storm squad in 2022, but did not play a match. In 2023, she played eight matches for Western Storm, across the Rachael Heyhoe Flint Trophy and the Charlotte Edwards Cup, taking six wickets. At the end of the season, it was announced that Robbins had signed her first professional contract with the side. In 2024, she played 10 matches for Western Storm, across the Rachael Heyhoe Flint Trophy and the Charlotte Edwards Cup, taking four wickets.
