= Sophie Luff =

English cricketer (born 1993)

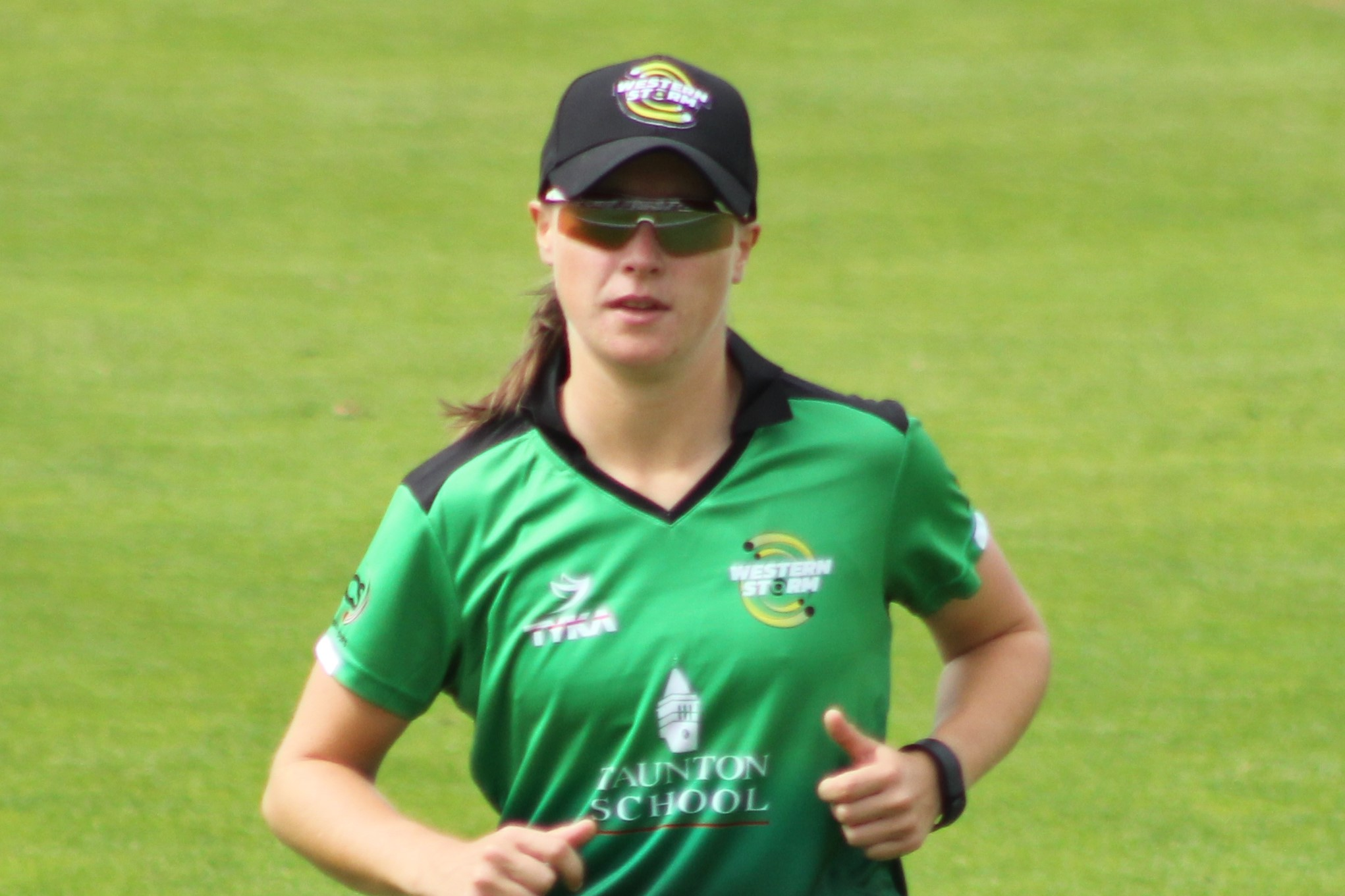
- Playing for Western Storm, 2017

Personal information
- Full name: Sophie Natasha Luff
- Born: 6 December 1993 (age 32); Taunton, Somerset, England
- Batting: Right-handed
- Bowling: Right-arm medium
- Role: Batter

Domestic team information
- Years: Team
- 2009–present: Somerset
- 2016–2024: Western Storm (squad no. 63)
- 2021: Welsh Fire
- 2022–2023: London Spirit
- 2022/23: New South Wales
- 2026: Trent Rockets

Career statistics
Competition	WLA	WT20
Matches	130	154
Runs scored	4,233	2,693
Batting average	42.75	28.34
100s/50s	7/27	0/10
Top score	157*	78
Balls bowled	296	197
Wickets	2	8
Bowling average	130.50	29.75
5 wickets in innings	0	0
10 wickets in match	0	0
Best bowling	1/27	2/12
Catches/stumpings	39/–	46/–
- Source: CricketArchive, 19 October 2024

Sophie Natasha Luff (born 6 December 1993) is an English cricketer who plays for Somerset and Southern Brave as a right-handed batter.

== Career ==
Luff came from a cricketing family in Lympsham, near Weston-super-Mare; both her father and brother also play cricket. During her childhood, she played boys cricket with Weston-super-Mare Cricket Club and captained the boys' team at Hugh Sexey’s Middle School; she later also played alongside the boys at The Kings of Wessex Academy. She attracted the attention of both Somerset and England, and represented England schoolgirls and later featured as part of the England academy, captaining both sides during her time with them.

After making her debut in English county cricket in 2009, aged 15, when she scored a duck, Luff maintained a batting average over fifty in 2010 and 2014, and over one hundred in 2015 and 2017. She studied at Cardiff Metropolitan University, gaining a First class honours degree in Sport and Physical Education. During 2015, she scored her maiden County Championship century, reaching 138 not out against Wales, and the Cricket Society named her the "most promising young female cricketer" of 2015.

She joined the Western Storm in the newly formed Women's Cricket Super League in 2016 and has featured for them ever since, playing as part of their 2017 winning team, including an unbeaten 30 in the final. According to Jamie Ramage of Women's Criczone, Luff's performances were an "integral part" of Western Storm's success in 2016 and 2017. In early 2018, she was named as Women’s and Girls Performance Head Coach for Somerset Cricket Board.

Luff became captain of Western Storm ahead of the 2020 season. In 2021, she scored 211 runs for Somerset in the 2021 Women's Twenty20 Cup, the fourth-highest in the competition. She captained Welsh Fire in the inaugural season of The Hundred. In the final Rachael Heyhoe Flint Trophy match of the 2021 season, Luff scored 157* against Sunrisers, her List A high score.

In April 2022, she was signed by the London Spirit for the 2022 season of The Hundred. Luff was the fifth-highest run-scorer in the 2022 Women's Twenty20 Cup, with 239 runs, and the fifth-highest run-scorer in the 2022 Rachael Heyhoe Flint Trophy, with 268 runs. She made her Twenty20 high score against Sunrisers in the Charlotte Edwards Cup, scoring 78 from 54 deliveries, as well as hitting 100* against the same opposition in the Rachael Heyhoe Flint Trophy.

In the winter of 2022–23, Luff played Premier Cricket for Parramatta, and was later signed by New South Wales to play in the Women's National Cricket League. She made her debut for the side on 18 December 2022, against Tasmania.

On 19 September 2024, Luff was announced as the first player given a professional contract with Somerset's new women's team, which was created as part of a restructuring of women's domestic cricket in England and Wales due to start in 2025 and that will see a move away from regional clubs.

In June 2026, Luff was called up as an injury replacement to play for the Trent Rockets in that year's edition of The Hundred.

Luff was voted as the Professional Cricketers' Association 2026 Women's Player of the Year.

Sporting positions
Preceded by Anya Shrubsole	Somerset women's cricket captain 2017–2022	Succeeded by Emily Edgcombe
