= 2024 The Hundred season =

Fourth season of The Hundred

- Dates: 23 July – 18 August 2024
- Administrator: England and Wales Cricket Board
- Cricket format: 100-ball cricket
- Tournament format(s): Group stage and knockout
- Champions: W: London Spirit (1st title); M: Oval Invincibles (2nd title)
- Participants: W: 8 M: 8
- Matches: 68; W: 34; M: 34
- Player of the series: W: Annabel Sutherland (Northern Superchargers); M: Sam Curran (Oval Invincibles)
- Most runs: W: Nat Sciver-Brunt (Trent Rockets) (303); M: James Vince (Southern Brave) (424)
- Most wickets: W: Linsey Smith (Northern Superchargers) (15); M: Two players (19) (Note: Adam Zampa and Tymal Mills both took 19 wickets in the men's competition.)
- Official website: The Hundred

The 2024 The Hundred season was the fourth season of The Hundred, a professional franchise 100-ball cricket tournament involving eight men's and women's teams located in major cities across United Kingdom.

The women's London Spirit won their first trophy, while the men's Oval Invincibles defended their title from 2023.

== Teams and venues ==
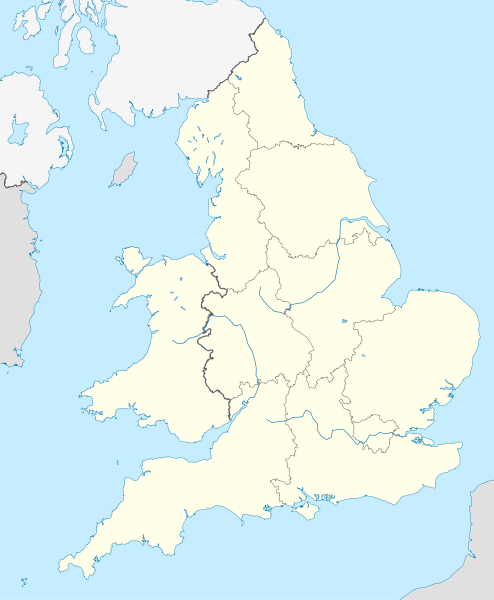
Venues in England and Wales

The eight teams that competed in the 2023 season returned for a fourth year.

Team	Venue	Men's Coach	Women's Coach
Birmingham Phoenix	Edgbaston, Birmingham	Daniel Vettori	Ben Sawyer
London Spirit	Lord's, London	Trevor Bayliss	Ashley Noffke
Manchester Originals	Old Trafford, Manchester	Simon Katich	Stephen Parry
Northern Superchargers	Headingley, Leeds	Andrew Flintoff	Danielle Hazell
Oval Invincibles	The Oval, London	Tom Moody	Jonathan Batty
Southern Brave	Rose Bowl, Southampton	Stephen Fleming	Charlotte Edwards
Trent Rockets	Trent Bridge, Nottingham	Andy Flower	Jon Lewis
Welsh Fire (Welsh: Tân Cymreig)	Sophia Gardens, Cardiff	Michael Hussey	Gareth Breese

== Background ==
As with the previous iterations of this competition, eight city-based teams will compete for the men's and women's titles over a month between 23 July and 18 August 2024.

The eight city-based teams will compete over 64 matches in the group stage (32 men's, 32 women's). All of the men's and women's matches will be held on the same day at the same grounds, with one ticket giving access to both contests.

Each team will play four matches at home and four matches away. This includes one match against every other side in the competition and then a bonus match against their nearest regional rivals.

After the league stage is complete, the top three teams will compete in the knockout stage to decide the ultimate champions. The second and third teams will meet in an eliminator at The Oval in London. The winner of the eliminator will then meet the team that finishes top of the league, in the final at Lord's.

Eliminator	Final
	First-placed team
Second-placed team	Winner of Eliminator
Third-placed team

== Draft ==
Player retentions for all eight teams were confirmed ahead of the draft in March. The draft took place on 20 March 2024. Wildcard picks were confirmed on 24 June 2024.

=== Women ===
Team captains in bold.

Prices	Birmingham Phoenix	London Spirit	Manchester Originals	Northern Superchargers	Oval Invincibles	Southern Brave	Trent Rockets	Welsh Fire
£50k	Amy Jones	Meg Lanning	Beth Mooney	Annabel Sutherland	Chamari Athapaththu	Smriti Mandhana	Ash Gardner	Hayley Matthews
£50k	Sophie Devine	**Heather Knight**	**Sophie Ecclestone**	Phoebe Litchfield	Marizanne Kapp	Danni Wyatt-Hodge	**Nat Sciver-Brunt**	Sophia Dunkley
£40k	Richa Ghosh	Grace Harris	Sophie Molineux	Georgia Wareham	Alice Capsey	Chloe Tryon	Grace Scrivens	Shabnim Ismail
£40k	**Ellyse Perry**	Dani Gibson	Laura Wolvaardt	Kate Cross	**Lauren Winfield-Hill**	Lauren Bell	Alana King	**Tammy Beaumont**
£30k	Katie Levick	Charlie Dean	Lauren Filer	Bess Heath	Amanda-Jade Wellington	Maia Bouchier	Heather Graham	Jess Jonassen
£30k	Issy Wong	Sarah Glenn	Eve Jones	Linsey Smith	Tash Farrant	Freya Kemp	Bryony Smith	Georgia Elwiss
£17.5k	Emily Arlott	Cordelia Griffith	Emma Lamb	Alice Davidson-Richards	Mady Villiers	Naomi Dattani	Katie George	Sarah Bryce
£17.5k	Hannah Baker	Georgia Redmayne	Mahika Gaur	**Hollie Armitage**	Paige Scholfield	**Georgia Adams**	Kirstie Gordon	Freya Davies
£14k	Seren Smale	Eva Gray	Fi Morris	Grace Ballinger	Sophia Smale	Lauren Cheatle	Grace Potts	Phoebe Franklin
£14k	Ailsa Lister	Sophie Munro	Kathryn Bryce	Marie Kelly	Ryana MacDonald-Gay	Kalea Moore	Alexa Stonehouse	Emily Windsor
£11k	Chloe Brewer	Hannah Jones	Phoebe Graham	Lucy Higham	Jo Gardner	Tilly Corteen-Coleman	Josie Groves	Ella McCaughan
£11k	Sterre Kalis	Tara Norris	Ellie Threlkeld	Ella Claridge	Lizzie Scott	Rhianna Southby	Kira Chathli	Claire Nicholas
£8k	Charis Pavely	Niamh Holland	Liberty Heap	Davina Perrin	Georgie Boyce	Mary Taylor	Cassidy McCarthy	Alex Griffiths
Wildcard (£8k)	Fran Wilson	Abbey Freeborn	Dani Gregory	Jodi Grewcock	Rachel Slater	Sophie Luff	Aylish Cranstone	Georgia Davis
Wildcard (£8k)	Alice Macleod	Ellie Anderson	Alice Monaghan	Sophia Turner	Amara Carr	Katie Jones	Nat Wraith	Kate Coppack

=== Replacements ===
On 24 June 2024 the ECB confirmed a number of replacements:

Birmingham Phoenix:

- Emma Jones to replace Ailsa Lister
- Suzie Bates to replace Richa Ghosh for the first three games

London Spirit:

- Deepti Sharma to replace Grace Harris
- Erin Burns to replace Deepti Sharma for the first two games

Manchester Originals:

- Kim Garth to replace Sophie Molineux
- Bethan Ellis to replace Mahika Gaur

Oval Invincibles:

- Laura Harris to replace Chamari Athapaththu for the first two games

Southern Brave:

- Charli Knott to replace Smriti Mandhana for the first two games

Welsh Fire:

- Beth Langston to replace Claire Nicholas

=== Men ===
Team captains in bold.

Price	Birmingham Phoenix	London Spirit	Manchester Originals	Northern Superchargers	Oval Invincibles	Southern Brave	Trent Rockets	Welsh Fire
Central	Chris Woakes	Zak Crawley	Jos Buttler	Ben Stokes	Sam Curran	Jofra Archer	Joe Root	Jonny Bairstow
£125k	Naseem Shah	Andre Russell	Jamie Overton	Nicholas Pooran	Tom Curran	Kieron Pollard	Rovman Powell	Tom Kohler-Cadmore
£125k	Liam Livingstone	Shimron Hetmeyer	**Phil Salt**	Adil Rashid	Will Jacks	**James Vince**	Rashid Khan	David Willey
£100k	**Moeen Ali**	Nathan Ellis	Sikandar Raza	Harry Brook	Adam Zampa	Chris Jordan	Imad Wasim	Shaheen Shah Afridi
£100k	Ben Duckett	**Dan Lawrence**	Paul Walter	Reece Topley	Jordan Cox	Tymal Mills	Alex Hales	Joe Clarke
£75k	Benny Howell	Liam Dawson	Fazalhaq Farooqi	Daniel Sams	Gus Atkinson	Laurie Evans	**Lewis Gregory**	Haris Rauf
£75k	Adam Milne	Dan Worrall	Tom Hartley	**Matt Short**	**Sam Billings**	Leus du Plooy	Luke Wood	**Tom Abell**
£60k	Jamie Smith	Olly Stone	Usama Mir	Brydon Carse	Saqib Mahmood	Akeal Hosein	Tom Banton	Glenn Phillips
£60k	Will Smeed	Adam Rossington	Wayne Madsen	Adam Hose	Spencer Johnson	Rehan Ahmed	John Turner	David Payne
£50k	Sean Abbott	Richard Gleeson	Josh Tongue	Tom Lawes	Dawid Malan	Craig Overton	Sam Hain	Luke Wells
£50k	Tom Helm	Ollie Pope	Max Holden	Matt Potts	Nathan Sowter	Finn Allen	Sam Cook	Roelof van der Merwe
£40k	James Fuller	Daniel Bell-Drummond	Josh Hull	Graham Clark	Donovan Ferreira	Danny Briggs	Calvin Harrison	Jake Ball
£40k	Dan Mousley	Matt Critchley	Fred Klaassen	Callum Parkinson	Tom Lammonby	George Garton	Jordan Thompson	Stevie Eskinazi
£30k	Jacob Bethell	Michael Pepper	Mitchell Stanley	Ollie Robinson	Tawanda Muyeye	Alex Davies	Adam Lyth	Chris Cooke
Wildcard (£30k)	Aneurin Donald	Ravi Bopara	Sonny Baker	Jordan Clark	Marchant de Lange	James Coles	Ollie Robinson	Mason Crane
Wildcard (£30k)	Rishi Patel	Ryan Higgins	Matty Hurst	Dillon Pennington	Mark Watt	Joe Weatherley	Tom Alsop	Ben Green

=== Replacements ===
The following players were replaced in the men's competition.

Birmingham Phoenix:

- Louis Kimber to replace Will Smeed
- Tim Southee to replace Naseem Shah

London Spirit:

- James Neesham to replace Zak Crawley until the end of the Test series against the West Indies
- Matthew Taylor to replace Ollie Pope until the end of the Test series against the West Indies

Manchester Originals:

- Tom Aspinwall to replace Fred Klaassen
- Scott Currie to replace Josh Tongue

Northern Superchargers:

- Jason Roy to replace Brydon Carse
- Mitchell Santner to replace Daniel Sams

Oval Invincibles:

- Harrison Ward to replace Gus Atkinson until the end of the Test series against the West Indies
- Spencer Johnson to replace Mohammad Amir

Trent Rockets:

- Riley Meredith to replace Joe Root until the end of the Test series against the West Indies

Welsh Fire:

- Matt Henry to replace Shaheen Afridi

== Standings ==
=== Women ===
Pos	Team	Pld	W	L	T	NR	Pts	NRR	Qualification
1	Welsh Fire	8	5	2	0	1	11	0.334	Advanced to the Final
2	Oval Invincibles	8	5	2	1	0	11	0.034	Advanced to the Eliminator
3	London Spirit	8	4	3	1	0	9	0.080	Advanced to the Eliminator
4	Northern Superchargers	8	3	3	1	1	8	0.942	
5	Trent Rockets	8	4	4	0	0	8	0.407	
6	Manchester Originals	8	3	4	0	1	7	−0.398	
7	Birmingham Phoenix	8	3	4	0	1	7	−0.742	
8	Southern Brave	8	1	6	1	0	3	−0.675	

Source: ESPNcricinfo

=== Men ===
Pos	Team	Pld	W	L	T	NR	Pts	NRR	Qualification
1	Oval Invincibles	8	6	2	0	0	12	0.893	Advanced to the Final
2	Birmingham Phoenix	8	6	2	0	0	12	0.402	Advanced to the Eliminator
3	Southern Brave	8	5	2	0	1	11	0.595	Advanced to the Eliminator
4	Northern Superchargers	8	5	2	0	1	11	−0.453	
5	Trent Rockets	8	4	4	0	0	8	0.348	
6	Welsh Fire	8	2	4	0	2	6	−0.215	
7	Manchester Originals	8	1	7	0	0	2	−0.886	
8	London Spirit	8	1	7	0	0	2	−0.975	

Source: ESPN Cricinfo

== Results ==
=== Women ===
23 July 2024
14:45
Scorecard

Oval Invincibles; 150/5 (100 balls)	v	Birmingham Phoenix; 105 (92 balls)
Paige Scholfield 71 (40); Emily Arlott 2/19 (20 balls)		Amy Jones 21 (15); Amanda-Jade Wellington 3/9 (20 balls)

Oval Invincibles won by 45 runs
The Oval, London
Umpires: Anna Harris (Eng) and Sue Redfern (Eng)
Player of the match: Paige Scholfield (Oval Invincibles)

- Birmingham Phoenix won the toss and elected to field.

24 July 2024
15:00
Scorecard

Southern Brave; 151/6 (100 balls)	v	London Spirit; 153/4 (97 balls)
Danni Wyatt 59 (35); Erin Burns 2/6 (10 balls)		Heather Knight 65* (31); Charli Knott 1/26 (15 balls)

London Spirit won by 6 wickets
Rose Bowl, Southampton
Umpires: Ian Blackwell (Eng) and Sue Redfern (Eng)
Player of the match: Heather Knight (London Spirit)

- London Spirit won the toss and elected to field.

25 July 2024
15:00
Scorecard

Manchester Originals; 113/7 (100 balls)	v	Welsh Fire; 117/3 (96 balls)
Laura Wolvaardt 37 (27); Jess Jonassen 3/17 (20 balls)		Sophia Dunkley 69* (47); Fi Morris 2/20 (16 balls)

Welsh Fire won by 7 wickets
Old Trafford, Manchester
Umpires: Jasmine Naeem (Eng) and Rob White (Eng)
Player of the match: Sophia Dunkley (Welsh Fire)

- Manchester Originals won the toss and elected to bat.

26 July 2024
15:00
Scorecard

Trent Rockets; 123/5 (100 balls)	v	Northern Superchargers; 103 (97 balls)
Nat Sciver-Brunt 36* (34); Annabel Sutherland 3/14 (20 balls)		Lucy Higham 26 (22); Heather Graham 3/13 (15 balls)

Trent Rockets won by 20 runs
Headingley, Leeds
Umpires: Hassan Adnan (Eng) and Grace Bambury (Eng)
Player of the match: Alana King (Trent Rockets)

- Trent Rockets won the toss and elected to bat.

27 July 2024
15:00
Scorecard

London Spirit; 147/9 (100 balls)	v	Birmingham Phoenix; 127/5 (100 balls)
Meg Lanning 53 (41); Katie Levick 3/24 (20 balls)		Ellyse Perry 65 (48); Sarah Glenn 3/22 (20 balls)

London Spirit won by 20 runs
Lord’s, London
Umpires: Sue Redfern (Eng) and John Ward (Aus)
Player of the match: Meg Lanning (London Spirit)

- Birmingham Phoenix won the toss and elected to field.

28 July 2024
15:00 (N)
Scorecard

Welsh Fire; 116/5 (100 balls)	v	Oval Invincibles; 118/4 (88 balls)
Sophia Dunkley 35 (26); Ryana MacDonald-Gay 2/20 (20 balls)		Alice Capsey 59 (48); Georgia Davis 3/33 (20 balls)

Oval Invincibles won by 6 wickets
Sophia Gardens, Cardiff
Umpires: Sophie McLelland (Eng) and Mark Newell (Eng)
Player of the match: Alice Capsey (Oval Invincibles)

- Welsh Fire won the toss and elected to bat.

29 July 2024
15:00
Scorecard

Manchester Originals; 137/6 (100 balls)	v	Trent Rockets; 136/4 (100 balls)
Eve Jones 34 (25); Heather Graham 2/31 (20 balls)		Nat Sciver-Brunt 56 (46); Lauren Filer 2/26 (20 balls)

Manchester Originals won by 1 run
Old Trafford, Manchester
Umpires: Grace Bambury (Eng) and Neil Pratt (Eng)
Player of the match: Lauren Filer (Manchester Originals)

- Trent Rockets won the toss and elected to field.

30 July 2024
15:00
Scorecard

Southern Brave; 100/8 (100 balls)	v	Northern Superchargers; 100/7 (100 balls)
Chloe Tryon 25 (24); Linsey Smith 2/24 (20 balls)		Alice Davidson-Richards 27 (22); Lauren Bell 4/11 (20 balls)

Match tied
Headingley, Leeds
Umpires: Michael Gough (Eng) and Joanne Ibbotson (Eng)
Player of the match: Lauren Bell (Southern Brave)

- Southern Brave won the toss and elected to bat.

31 July 2024
15:00
Scorecard

Birmingham Phoenix; 139/3 (100 balls)	v	Trent Rockets; 136/7 (100 balls)
Ellyse Perry 66 (34); Heather Graham 1/15 (20 balls)		Nat Sciver-Brunt 59 (37); Charis Pavely 2/20 (20 balls)

Birmingham Phoenix won by 3 runs
Trent Bridge, Nottingham
Umpires: Grace Bambury (Eng) and Neil Pratt (Eng)
Player of the match: Ellyse Perry (Birmingham Phoenix)

- Birmingham Phoenix won the toss and elected to bat.

1 August 2024
11:30
Scorecard

London Spirit; 150/5 (100 balls)	v	Welsh Fire; 151/4 (95 balls)
Danielle Gibson 41 (25); Freya Davies 2/19 (20 balls)		Hayley Matthews 78* (46); Danielle Gibson 2/28 (15 balls)

Welsh Fire won by 6 wickets
Lord’s, London
Umpires: Rose Dovey (Eng) and Tom Lungley (Eng)
Player of the match: Hayley Matthews (Welsh Fire)

- Welsh Fire won the toss and elected to field.

1 August 2024
15:00
Scorecard

Southern Brave; 136/5 (100 balls)	v	Manchester Originals; 140/4 (98 balls)
Danni Wyatt 61 (46); Sophie Ecclestone 2/17 (20 balls)		Laura Wolvaardt 78* (52); Georgia Adams 2/24 (15 balls)

Manchester Originals won by 6 wickets
Rose Bowl, Southampton
Umpires: Sophie McLelland (Eng) and Mark Newell (Eng)
Player of the match: Laura Wolvaardt (Manchester Originals)

- Manchester Originals won the toss and elected to field.

2 August 2024
15:00
Scorecard

Northern Superchargers; 146/4 (100 balls)	v	Oval Invincibles; 64 (66 balls)
Annabel Sutherland 63* (40); Rachel Slater 2/11 (15 balls)		Amanda-Jade Wellington 26 (21); Annabel Sutherland 4/11 (16 balls)

Northern Superchargers won by 82 runs
The Oval, London
Umpires: Hassan Adnan (Eng) and Stephen Harris (SA)
Player of the match: Annabel Sutherland (Northern Superchargers)

- Oval Invincibles won the toss and elected to field.

3 August 2024
11:00
Scorecard

Birmingham Phoenix; 137/7 (100 balls)	v	Southern Brave; 121 (97 balls)
Amy Jones 51 (36); Tilly Corteen-Coleman 2/22 (20 balls)		Danni Wyatt 43 (33); Charis Pavely 3/21 (20 balls)

Birmingham Phoenix won by 16 runs
Edgbaston, Birmingham
Umpires: Grace Bambury (Eng) and Tom Lungley (Eng)
Player of the match: Amy Jones (Birmingham Phoenix)

- Southern Brave won the toss and elected to field.

3 August 2024
14:30
Scorecard

Trent Rockets; 130/5 (100 balls)	v	Welsh Fire; 131/4 (98 balls)
Nat Sciver-Brunt 37 (26); Jess Jonassen 2/29 (20 balls)		Sarah Bryce 51* (39); Nat Sciver-Brunt 2/32 (20 balls)

Welsh Fire won by 6 wickets
Trent Bridge, Nottingham
Umpires: Mark Newell (Eng) and Jasmine Naeem (Eng)
Player of the match: Sarah Bryce (Welsh Fire)

- Trent Rockets won the toss and elected to bat.

4 August 2024
11:00
Scorecard

London Spirit; 113/9 (100 balls)	v	Oval Invincibles; 113/8 (100 balls)
Deepti Sharma 44 (34); Marizanne Kapp 4/11 (20 balls)		Marizanne Kapp 47 (32); Deepti Sharma 3/18 (20 balls)

Match tied
Lord’s, London
Umpires: Rose Dovey (Eng) and Chris Watts (Eng)
Player of the match: Marizanne Kapp (Oval Invincibles)

- Oval Invincibles won the toss and elected to field.

4 August 2024
14:30
Scorecard

Northern Superchargers; 138/4 (100 balls)	v	Manchester Originals; 92 (96 balls)
Annabel Sutherland 44 (26); Lauren Filer 2/16 (20 balls)		Lauren Filer 20* (11); Kate Cross 4/20 (16 balls)

Northern Superchargers won by 46 runs
Headingley, Leeds
Umpires: Mark Newell (Eng) and Jasmine Naeem (Eng)
Player of the match: Annabel Sutherland (Northern Superchargers)

- Manchester Originals won the toss and elected to field.

5 August 2024
15:00
Scorecard

Southern Brave; 84 (91 balls)	v	Welsh Fire; 88/3 (90 balls)
Georgia Adams 17 (18); Hayley Matthews 3/16 (20 balls)		Tammy Beaumont 34 (36); Lauren Cheatle 2/8 (20 balls)

Welsh Fire won by 7 wickets
Sophia Gardens, Cardiff
Umpires: Joanne Ibbotson (Eng) and Tom Lungley (Eng)
Player of the match: Hayley Matthews (Welsh Fire)

- Welsh Fire won the toss and elected to field.

6 August 2024
11:30
Scorecard

Manchester Originals; 125/4 (100 balls)	v	Oval Invincibles; 127/3 (93 balls)
Laura Wolvaardt 38 (29); Amanda-Jade Wellington 2/22 (20 balls)		Paige Scholfield 48* (27); Alice Monaghan 2/7 (10 balls)

Oval Invincibles won by 7 wickets
Old Trafford, Manchester
Umpires: Jasmine Naeem (Eng) and Jack Shantry (Eng)
Player of the match: Paige Scholfield (Oval Invincibles)

- Manchester Originals won the toss and elected to bat.

6 August 2024
15:00
Scorecard

Northern Superchargers; 115/5 (100 balls)	v	Birmingham Phoenix; 54 (86 balls)
Alice Davidson-Richards 49* (42); Ellyse Perry 2/13 (10 balls)		Sophie Devine 20 (25); Linsey Smith 3/12 (20 balls)

Northern Superchargers won by 61 runs
Edgbaston, Birmingham
Umpires: Anna Harris (Eng) and Chris Watts (Eng)
Player of the match: Alice Davidson-Richards (Northern Superchargers)

- Northern Superchargers won the toss and elected to bat.

7 August 2024
15:00
Scorecard

Trent Rockets; 158/5 (100 balls)	v	London Spirit; 127/7 (100 balls)
Grace Scrivens 55 (43); Deepti Sharma 2/25 (20 balls)		Deepti Sharma 30* (23); Ashleigh Gardner 3/23 (20 balls); Alana King 3/23 (20 balls)

Trent Rockets won by 31 runs
Trent Bridge, Nottingham
Umpires: Michael Gough (Eng) and Sue Redfern (Eng)
Player of the match: Ashleigh Gardner (Trent Rockets)

- London Spirit won the toss and elected to field.

8 August 2024
11:30
Scorecard

Welsh Fire	v	Northern Superchargers

Match abandoned
Sophia Gardens, Cardiff
Umpires: Jasmine Naeem (Eng) and Surendiran Shanmugam (Eng)

- No toss.
- No play was possible due to rain.

8 August 2024
15:00
Scorecard

Oval Invincibles; 79/4 (65 balls)	v	Southern Brave; 85/3 (64 balls)
Marizanne Kapp 26* (17); Lauren Cheatle 2/6 (15 balls)		Danni Wyatt 46* (37); Ryana MacDonald-Gay 1/7 (15 balls)

Southern Brave won by 7 wickets (DLS method)
The Oval, London
Umpires: Joanne Ibbotson (Eng) and Chris Watts (Eng)
Player of the match: Danni Wyatt (Southern Brave)

- Southern Brave won the toss and elected to field.
- The match was reduced to 65 balls per side due to rain.
- Southern Brave were set a revised target of 83 runs from 65 balls due to rain.

9 August 2024
15:00
Scorecard

Manchester Originals; 112/7 (100 balls)	v	London Spirit; 115/2 (92 balls)
Kathryn Bryce 32 (27); Charlie Dean 3/20 (20 balls)		Georgia Redmayne 66* (59); Alice Monaghan 1/20 (12 balls)

London Spirit won by 8 wickets
Lord’s, London
Umpires: Sophie McLelland (Eng) and Mark Newell (Eng)
Player of the match: Georgia Redmayne (London Spirit)

- London Spirit won the toss and elected to field.

10 August 2024
11:00
Scorecard

Trent Rockets; 155/7 (100 balls)	v	Southern Brave; 131/6 (100 balls)
Nat Sciver-Brunt 60* (37); Lauren Bell 3/36 (20 balls)		Chloe Tryon 47* (31); Alexa Stonehouse 2/10 (15 balls)

Trent Rockets won by 24 runs
Rose Bowl, Southampton
Umpires: Grace Bambury (Eng) and Surendiran Shanmugham (Eng)
Player of the match: Nat Sciver-Brunt (Trent Rockets)

- Southern Brave won the toss and elected to field.

10 August 2024
14:30
Scorecard

Birmingham Phoenix; 121/7 (100 balls)	v	Welsh Fire; 112/8 (100 balls)
Sterre Kalis 55 (44); Hayley Matthews 3/32 (20 balls)		Hayley Matthews 35 (38); Ellyse Perry 2/9 (20 balls)

Birmingham Phoenix won by 9 runs
Sophia Gardens, Cardiff
Umpires: Hassan Adnan and Anna Harris
Player of the match: Sterre Kalis (Birmingham Phoenix)

- Welsh Fire won the toss and elected to field.

11 August 2024
11:00
Scorecard

London Spirit; 120/8 (100 balls)	v	Oval Invincibles; 121/2 (91 balls)
Deepti Sharma 46* (30); Sophia Smale 2/25 (15 balls)		Lauren Winfield-Hill 61* (40); Danielle Gibson 1/19 (16 balls)

Oval Invincibles won by 8 wickets
The Oval, London
Umpires: Rose Dovey (Eng) and David Millns (Eng)
Player of the match: Lauren Winfield-Hill (Oval Invincibles)

- Oval Invincibles won the toss and elected to field.

11 August 2024
14:30
Scorecard

Manchester Originals; 151/3 (100 balls)	v	Northern Superchargers; 134/8 (100 balls)
Beth Mooney 99* (54); Linsey Smith 1/32 (20 balls)		Phoebe Litchfield 45 (29); Kathryn Bryce 5/13 (20 balls)

Manchester Originals won by 17 runs
Old Trafford, Manchester
Umpires: Grace Bambury (Eng) and Jack Shantry (Eng)
Player of the match: Beth Mooney (Manchester Originals)

- Manchester Originals won the toss and elected to bat.

12 August 2024
15:00
Scorecard

Birmingham Phoenix; 112/6 (100 balls)	v	Trent Rockets; 114/7 (97 balls)
Sterre Kalis 47 (45); Nat Sciver-Brunt 2/16 (20 balls)		Nat Sciver-Brunt 34 (25); Charis Pavely 2/21 (20 balls); Emily Arlott 2/21 (20 balls)

Trent Rockets won by 3 wickets
Edgbaston, Birmingham
Umpires: Sophie McLelland (Eng) and Surendiran Shanmugham (Eng)
Player of the match: Nat Sciver-Brunt (Trent Rockets)

- Birmingham Phoenix won the toss and elected to bat.

13 August 2024
15:00
Scorecard

Northern Superchargers; 99/7 (100 balls)	v	London Spirit; 105/3 (86 balls)
Alice Davidson-Richards 33 (39); Eva Gray 3/17 (20 balls)		Heather Knight 43* (35); Linsey Smith 3/16 (20 balls)

London Spirit won by 7 wickets
Headingley, Leeds
Umpires: Jack Shantry (Eng) and Sophie McLelland (Eng)
Player of the match: Deepti Sharma (London Spirit)

- Northern Superchargers won the toss and elected to bat.

14 August 2024
11:30
Scorecard

Southern Brave; 103 (100 balls)	v	Welsh Fire; 106/1 (74 balls)
Chloe Tryon 55 (38); Hayley Matthews 4/14 (20 balls)		Tammy Beaumont 59* (40); Lauren Bell 1/18 (20 balls)

Welsh Fire won by 9 wickets
Rose Bowl, Southampton
Umpires: Hassan Adnan (Eng) and Rose Dovey (Eng)
Player of the match: Hayley Matthews (Welsh Fire)

- Welsh Fire won the toss and elected to field.

14 August 2024
15:00
Scorecard

Trent Rockets; 91/8 (100 balls)	v	Oval Invincibles; 92/5 (94 balls)
Ashleigh Gardner 43 (26); Marizanne Kapp 3/8 (20 balls)		Marizanne Kapp 26* (24); Ashleigh Gardner 2/23 (19 balls)

Oval Invincibles won by 5 wickets
Trent Bridge, Nottingham
Umpires: Sophie McLelland (Eng) and Neil Pratt (Eng)
Player of the match: Marizanne Kapp (Oval Invincibles)

- Oval Invincibles won the toss and elected to field.

15 August 2024
15:00
Scorecard

Birmingham Phoenix; 98/2 (70 balls)	v	Manchester Originals
Ellyse Perry 45* (39); Lauren Filer 1/13 (15 balls)

No result
Edgbaston, Birmingham
Umpires: Anna Harris (Eng) and Neil Pratt (Eng)

- Birmingham Phoenix won the toss and elected to bat.
- Rain prevented any further play.

=== Men ===
Match 1
23 July 2024
18:30 (N)
Scorecard

Birmingham Phoenix; 89 (81 balls)	v	Oval Invincibles; 93/2 (69 balls)
Rishi Patel 25 (24); Adam Zampa 3/11 (20 balls)		Sam Billings 31* (28); Tim Southee 2/20 (20 balls)

Oval Invincibles won by 8 wickets
The Oval, London
Umpires: Graham Lloyd (Eng) and Russell Warren (Eng)
Player of the match: Adam Zampa (Oval Invincibles)

- Birmingham Phoenix won the toss and elected to bat.

Match 2
24 July 2024
18:30 (N)
Scorecard

London Spirit; 138/9 (100 balls)	v	Southern Brave; 139/3 (89 balls)
Liam Dawson 45* (19); Craig Overton 3/16 (20 balls)		James Vince 56 (35); Nathan Ellis 1/22 (20 balls)

Southern Brave won by 7 wickets
Rose Bowl, Southampton
Umpires: Ben Debenham (Eng) and Graham Lloyd (Eng)
Player of the match: Craig Overton (Southern Brave)

- London Spirit won the toss and elected to bat.

Match 3
25 July 2024
18:30 (N)
Scorecard

Manchester Originals; 86/8 (100 balls)	v	Welsh Fire; 87/2 (57 balls)
Scott Currie 26* (25); David Willey 3/14 (20 balls)		Joe Clarke 33* (24); Paul Walter 1/10 (10 balls)

Welsh Fire won by 8 wickets
Old Trafford, Manchester
Umpires: Paul Pollard (Eng) and Steve O'Shaughnessy (Eng)
Player of the match: David Willey (Welsh Fire)

- Welsh Fire won the toss and elected to field.

Match 4
26 July 2024
18:35 (N)
Scorecard

Trent Rockets; 185/5 (100 balls)	v	Northern Superchargers; 138/8 (100 balls)
Tom Banton 66 (38); Ben Dwarshuis 2/28 (20 balls)		Ben Dwarshuis 40* (20); Chris Green 3/14 (20 balls)

Trent Rockets won by 47 runs
Headingley, Leeds
Umpires: Paul Pollard (Eng) and Steve O'Shaughnessy (Eng)
Player of the match: Chris Green (Trent Rockets)

- Northern Superchargers won the toss and elected to field.

Match 5
27 July 2024
18:35 (N)
Scorecard

London Spirit; 127/7 (100 balls)	v	Birmingham Phoenix; 131/7 (99 balls)
Andre Russell 37* (20); Sean Abbott 4/12 (20 balls)		Jacob Bethell 43 (27); Olly Stone 2/14 (15 balls)

Birmingham Phoenix won by 3 wickets
Lord’s, London
Umpires: Ben Debenham (Eng) and Rob White (Eng)
Player of the match: Sean Abbott (Birmingham Phoenix)

- Birmingham Phoenix won the toss and elected to field.

Match 6
28 July 2024
18:35 (N)
Scorecard

Oval Invincibles; 113/9 (100 balls)	v	Welsh Fire; 103/8 (100 balls)
Donovan Ferreira 30 (23); Jake Ball 3/24 (20 balls)		David Payne 28 (15); Adam Zampa 3/24 (20 balls)

Oval Invincibles won by 10 runs
Sophia Gardens, Cardiff
Umpires: Ian Blackwell (Eng) and Steve O'Shaughnessy (Eng)
Player of the match: Adam Zampa (Oval Invincibles)

- Welsh Fire won the toss and elected to field.

Match 7
29 July 2024
18:35 (N)
Scorecard

Trent Rockets; 145/7 (100 balls)	v	Manchester Originals; 144/8 (100 balls)
Tom Banton 45 (22); Tom Hartley 3/25 (20 balls)		Max Holden 40 (37); Imad Wasim 2/21 (20 balls)

Trent Rockets won by 1 run
Old Trafford, Manchester
Umpires: Alex Wharf and David Millns
Player of the match: Tom Banton (Trent Rockets)

- Manchester Originals won the toss and elected to field.
- Rashid Khan (Trent Rockets) became the fastest bowler to take 600 wickets in T20s, in terms of matches (441).

Match 8
30 July 2024
18:35 (N)
Scorecard

Southern Brave; 146/8 (100 balls)	v	Northern Superchargers; 147/3 (85 balls)
Kieron Pollard 37 (22); Callum Parkinson 2/38 (20 balls)		Nicholas Pooran 62 (34); Jofra Archer 1/19 (20 balls)

Northern Superchargers won by 7 wickets
Headingley, Leeds
Umpires: Paul Pollard (Eng) and Martin Saggers
Player of the match: Nicholas Pooran (Northern Superchargers)

- Southern Brave won the toss and elected to bat.

Match 9
31 July 2024
18:30 (N)
Scorecard

Birmingham Phoenix; 138/6 (100 balls)	v	Trent Rockets; 132/8 (100 balls)
Jacob Bethell 46* (29); Rashid Khan 2/23 (20 balls)		Alex Hales 38 (30); Dan Mousley 3/9 (15 balls)

Birmingham Phoenix won by 6 runs
Trent Bridge, Nottingham
Umpires: Ben Debenham (Eng) and Alex Wharf (Eng)
Player of the match: Dan Mousley (Birmingham Phoenix)

- Trent Rockets won the toss and elected to field.

Match 10
1 August 2024
15:00
Scorecard

Welsh Fire; 94/9 (100 balls)	v	London Spirit; 96/7 (87 balls)
Luke Wells 23 (8); Liam Dawson 3/10 (20 balls)		Shimron Hetmyer 30* (21); Matt Henry 3/19 (20 balls)

London Spirit won by 3 wickets
Lord’s, London
Umpires: Paul Pollard (Eng) and Martin Saggers (Eng)
Player of the match: Liam Dawson (Welsh Fire)

- London Spirit won the toss and elected to field.

Match 11
1 August 2024
18:30 (N)
Scorecard

Manchester Originals; 116/6 (100 balls)	v	Southern Brave; 117/3 (78 balls)
Wayne Madsen 43* (37); Craig Overton 2/11 (20 balls)		Laurie Evans 25* (15); Usama Mir 1/10 (15 balls)

Southern Brave won by 7 wickets
Rose Bowl, Southampton
Umpires: Ian Blackwell (Eng) and Rob White (Eng)
Player of the match: Craig Overton (Southern Brave)

- Southern Brave won the toss and elected to field.

Match 12
2 August 2024
18:30 (N)
Scorecard

Northern Superchargers; 145/5 (100 balls)	v	Oval Invincibles; 126/9 (100 balls)
Nicholas Pooran 65* (41); Sam Curran 2/20 (15 balls)		Donovan Ferreira 49 (24); Matthew Potts 2/18 (20 balls)

Northern Superchargers won by 19 runs
The Oval, London
Umpires: Mike Burns (Eng) and Graham Lloyd (Eng)
Player of the match: Nicholas Pooran (Northern Superchargers)

- Oval Invincibles won the toss and elected to field.

Match 13
3 August 2024
14:30
Scorecard

Southern Brave; 169/2 (100 balls)	v	Birmingham Phoenix; 137/9 (100 balls)
James Vince 90* (47); Benny Howell 1/32 (15 balls)		Ben Duckett 92 (53); Chris Jordan 3/19 (20 balls)

Southern Brave won by 32 runs
Edgbaston, Birmingham
Umpires: Paul Pollard (Eng) and Russell Warren (Eng)
Player of the match: James Vince (Southern Brave)

- Birmingham Phoenix won the toss and elected to field.

Match 14
3 August 2024
18:00 (N)
Scorecard

Welsh Fire; 129/6 (100 balls)	v	Trent Rockets; 125/8 (100 balls)
Jonny Bairstow 55 (45); Sam Cook 2/22 (15 balls)		Alex Hales 23 (16); Haris Rauf 2/15 (20 balls)

Welsh Fire won by 4 runs
Trent Bridge, Nottingham
Umpires: Michael Gough (Eng) and Alex Wharf (Eng)
Player of the match: Jonny Bairstow (Welsh Fire)

- Trent Rockets won the toss and elected to field.

Match 15
4 August 2024
14:30
Scorecard

Oval Invincibles; 147/5 (100 balls)	v	London Spirit; 117 (95 balls)
Sam Curran 51* (22); Matt Critchley 1/14 (15 balls)		Dan Lawrence 27 (18); Sam Curran 5/16 (20 balls)

Oval Invincibles won by 30 runs
Lord’s, London
Umpires: Mike Burns (Eng) and Stephen Harris (SA)
Player of the match: Sam Curran (Oval Invincibles)

- Oval Invincibles won the toss and elected to bat.

Match 16
4 August 2024
18:00 (N)
Scorecard

Northern Superchargers; 167/5 (100 balls)	v	Manchester Originals; 153/6 (100 balls)
Harry Brook 58 (33); Fazalhaq Farooqi 2/14 (20 balls)		Matthew Hurst 78 (45); Mitchell Santner 2/23 (20 balls)

Northern Superchargers won by 14 runs
Headingley, Leeds
Umpires: James Middlebrook (Eng) and Alex Wharf (Eng)
Player of the match: Harry Brook (Northern Superchargers)

- Manchester Originals won the toss and elected to field.

Match 17
5 August 2024
18:30 (N)
Scorecard

Southern Brave; 139/5 (100 balls)	v	Welsh Fire; 97 (95 balls)
James Vince 73* (50); Haris Rauf 2/22 (20 balls)		David Willey 21 (14); Tymal Mills 4/16 (20 balls)

Southern Brave won by 42 runs
Sophia Gardens, Cardiff
Umpires: Mike Burns (Eng) and Russell Warren (Eng)
Player of the match: James Vince (Southern Brave)

- Welsh Fire won the toss and elected to field.

Match 18
6 August 2024
15:00
Scorecard

Oval Invincibles; 164/8 (100 balls)	v	Manchester Originals; 161/7 (100 balls)
Sam Curran 68 (38); Sikandar Raza 2/17 (20 balls)		Matthew Hurst 50 (29); Sam Curran 2/16 (15 balls)

Oval Invincibles won by 3 runs
Old Trafford, Manchester
Umpires: James Middlebrook (Eng) and Martin Saggers (Eng)
Player of the match: Sam Curran (Oval Invincibles)

- Manchester Originals won the toss and elected to field.

Match 19
6 August 2024
18:30 (N)
Scorecard

Northern Superchargers; 83 (96 balls)	v	Birmingham Phoenix; 86/0 (39 balls)
Harry Brook 15 (14); Tim Southee 3/15 (20 balls)		Ben Duckett 43* (20)

Birmingham Phoenix won by 10 wickets
Edgbaston, Birmingham
Umpires: Michael Gough (Eng) and Stephen Harris (SA)
Player of the match: Tim Southee (Birmingham Phoenix)

- Northern Superchargers won the toss and elected to bat.

Match 20
7 August 2024
18:30 (N)
Scorecard

Trent Rockets; 166/4 (100 balls)	v	London Spirit; 144 (97 balls)
Alex Hales 68 (42); Richard Gleeson 2/32 (20 balls)		Matt Critchley 37 (30); Rashid Khan 4/24 (20 balls)

Trent Rockets won by 22 runs
Trent Bridge, Nottingham
Umpires: James Middlebrook (Eng) and Russell Warren (Eng)
Player of the match: Rashid Khan (Trent Rockets)

- Trent Rockets won the toss and elected to bat.

Match 21
8 August 2024
15:00
Scorecard

Northern Superchargers; 26/5 (25 balls)	v	Welsh Fire; 3/0 (2 balls)
Ollie Robinson 8* (6); Matt Henry 2/8 (10 balls)		Luke Wells 2* (2)

No result
Sophia Gardens, Cardiff
Umpires: Mike Burns (Eng) and Martin Saggers (Eng)

- Welsh Fire won the toss and elected to field.
- The match was reduced to 25 balls per side due to rain.
- Rain prevented any further play.

Match 22
8 August 2024
18:30 (N)
Scorecard

Southern Brave; 118/8 (100 balls)	v	Oval Invincibles; 120/4 (85 balls)
James Vince 52 (39); Tom Curran 4/24 (20 balls)		Jordan Cox 46* (29); Chris Jordan 1/14 (15 balls)

Oval Invincibles won by 6 wickets
The Oval, London
Umpires: Ben Debenham (Eng) and David Millns (Eng)
Player of the match: Sam Curran (Oval Invincibles)

- Oval Invincibles won the toss and elected to field.

Match 23
9 August 2024
18:30 (N)
Scorecard

Manchester Originals; 135/5 (100 balls)	v	London Spirit; 123/5 (100 balls)
Phil Salt 58 (41); Richard Gleeson 2/32 (20 balls)		Keaton Jennings 61* (50); Fazalhaq Farooqi 3/24 (20 balls)

Manchester Originals won by 12 runs
Lord’s, London
Umpires: Steve O'Shaughnessy (Eng) and Alex Wharf (Eng)
Player of the match: Phil Salt (Manchester Originals)

- London Spirit won the toss and elected to field.

Match 24
10 August 2024
14:30
Scorecard

Trent Rockets; 126/8 (100 balls)	v	Southern Brave; 127/8 (99 balls)
Tom Banton 30 (17); Chris Jordan 3/22 (20 balls)		Kieron Pollard 45 (23); John Turner 3/24 (20 balls)

Southern Brave won by 2 wickets
Rose Bowl, Southampton
Umpires: Mike Burns (Eng) and David Millns (Eng)
Player of the match: Kieron Pollard (Southern Brave)

- Trent Rockets won the toss and elected to bat.

Match 25
10 August 2024
18:00 (N)
Scorecard

Welsh Fire; 146/8 (100 balls)	v	Birmingham Phoenix; 149/5 (93 balls)
Tom Kohler-Cadmore 54 (32); Sean Abbott 4/16 (20 balls)		Moeen Ali 60 (46); Haris Rauf 2/24 (20 balls)

Birmingham Phoenix won by 5 wickets
Sophia Gardens, Cardiff
Umpires: Ben Debenham (Eng) and Rob White (Eng)
Player of the match: Sean Abbott (Birmingham Phoenix)

- Welsh Fire won the toss and elected to bat.

Match 26
11 August 2024
14:30
Scorecard

London Spirit; 96 (92 balls)	v	Oval Invincibles; 100/1 (63 balls)
Michael Pepper 27 (18); Adam Zampa 4/17 (20 balls)		Jordan Cox 61* (30); Olly Stone 1/16 (15 balls)

Oval Invincibles won by 9 wickets
The Oval, London
Umpires: James Middlebrook (Eng) and Alex Wharf (Eng)
Player of the match: Adam Zampa (Oval Invincibles)

- Oval Invincibles won the toss and elected to field.

Match 27
11 August 2024
18:00 (N)
Scorecard

Manchester Originals; 152/7 (100 balls)	v	Northern Superchargers; 156/3 (97 balls)
Phil Salt 61 (28); Mitchell Santner 3/24 (20 balls)		Nicholas Pooran 66* (33); Usama Mir 1/14 (20 balls)

Northern Superchargers won by 7 wickets
Old Trafford, Manchester
Umpires: Graham Lloyd (Eng) and Russell Warren (Eng)
Player of the match: Nicholas Pooran (Northern Superchargers)

- Northern Superchargers won the toss and elected to field.

Match 28
12 August 2024
18:30 (N)
Scorecard

Trent Rockets; 118 (100 balls)	v	Birmingham Phoenix; 120/4 (93 balls)
Tom Alsop 51 (37); Tim Southee 5/12 (20 balls)		Jacob Bethell 38* (29); John Turner 2/17 (20 balls)

Birmingham Phoenix won by 6 wickets
Edgbaston, Birmingham
Umpires: Mark Newell (Eng) and Steve O'Shaughnessy (Eng)
Player of the match: Tim Southee (Birmingham Phoenix)

- Birmingham Phoenix won the toss and elected to field.

Match 29
13 August 2024
18:30 (N)
Scorecard

London Spirit; 111/8 (100 balls)	v	Northern Superchargers; 64/1 (44 balls)
Ravi Bopara 31 (29); Adil Rashid 3/16 (20 balls)		Graham Clark 26 (13); Matt Critchley 1/11 (10 balls)

Northern Superchargers won by 21 runs (DLS method)
Headingley, Leeds
Umpires: James Middlebrook (Eng) and Russell Warren (Eng)
Player of the match: Adil Rashid (Northern Superchargers)

- Northern Superchargers won the toss and elected to field.
- Rain prevented any further play.
- Northern Superchargers were ahead of the DLS par score of 43 runs from 44 balls.

Match 30
14 August 2024
15:00
Scorecard

Welsh Fire; 181/5 (100 balls)	v	Southern Brave; 21/2 (16 balls)
Luke Wells 53 (30); Tymal Mills 2/38 (20 balls)		James Vince 19 (8); Matt Henry 1/1 (6 balls)

No result
Rose Bowl, Southampton
Umpires: Martin Saggers (Eng) and Rob White (Eng)

- Welsh Fire won the toss and elected to bat.
- Rain prevented any further play.

Match 31
14 August 2024
18:30 (N)
Scorecard

Oval Invincibles; 150/3 (100 balls)	v	Trent Rockets; 151/4 (94 balls)
Dawid Malan 53* (43); Sam Cook 2/23 (20 balls)		Rovman Powell 45 (27); Nathan Sowter 1/18 (15 balls)

Trent Rockets won by 6 wickets
Trent Bridge, Nottingham
Umpires: Ian Blackwell (Eng) and Tom Lungley (Eng)
Player of the match: Rovman Powell (Trent Rockets)

- Oval Invincibles won the toss and elected to bat.

Match 32
15 August 2024
18:30 (N)
Scorecard

Manchester Originals; 41/5 (30 balls)	v	Birmingham Phoenix; 42/1 (22 balls)
Max Holden 15 (10); Adam Milne 2/8 (10 balls)		Ben Duckett 22* (12); Scott Currie 1/8 (7 balls)

Birmingham Phoenix won by 9 wickets
Edgbaston, Birmingham
Umpires: Ian Blackwell (Eng) and Tom Lungley (Eng)
Player of the match: Adam Milne (Birmingham Phoenix)

- Birmingham Phoenix won the toss and elected to field.
- The match was reduced to 30 balls per side due to rain.

== Knockout stages ==
=== Women ===
Eliminator			Final
			1	Welsh Fire	115/8 (100 balls)
2	Oval Invincibles	113/9 (100 balls)	EW	London Spirit	118/6 (98 balls)
3	London Spirit	116/2 (91 balls)

==== Eliminator ====
17 August 2024
14:15
Scorecard

Oval Invincibles; 113/9 (100 balls)	v	London Spirit; 116/2 (91 balls)
Alice Capsey 30 (33); Charlie Dean 3/24 (20 balls)		Georgia Redmayne 53* (47); Marizanne Kapp 1/19 (20 balls)

London Spirit won by 8 wickets
The Oval, London
Umpires: Mark Newell (Eng) and Rose Dovey (Eng)
Player of the match: Georgia Redmayne (London Spirit)

- London Spirit won the toss and elected to field.

==== Final ====
18 August 2024
14:15
Scorecard

Welsh Fire; 115/8 (100 balls)	v	London Spirit; 118/6 (98 balls)
Jess Jonassen 54 (41); Sarah Glenn 2/17 (20 balls)		Georgia Redmayne 34 (32); Shabnim Ismail 3/24 (20 balls)

London Spirit won by 4 wickets
Lord's, London
Attendance: 22,009
Umpires: Anna Harris (Eng) and Tom Lungley (Eng)
Player of the match: Georgia Redmayne (London Spirit)

- London Spirit won the toss and elected to field.
- London Spirit won their first women's Hundred title.

=== Men ===
Eliminator			Final
			1	Oval Invincibles	147/9 (100 balls)
2	Birmingham Phoenix	126/7 (100 balls)	EW	Southern Brave	130/7 (100 balls)
3	Southern Brave	126/6 (100 balls)

==== Eliminator ====
17 August 2024
18:00 (N)
Scorecard

Southern Brave; 126/6 (100 balls)	v	Birmingham Phoenix; 126/7 (100 balls)
James Vince 43 (35); Adam Milne 3/18 (20 balls)		Liam Livingstone 55 (34); Tymal Mills 3/23 (20 balls)

Match tied (Southern Brave won the Super Five)
The Oval, London
Umpires: Mike Burns (Eng) and James Middlebrook (Eng)
Player of the match: Jofra Archer (Southern Brave)

- Birmingham Phoenix won the toss and elected to field.
- Super Five: Birmingham Phoenix 7/2, Southern Brave 11/0

==== Final ====
18 August 2024
18:00 (N)
Scorecard

Oval Invincibles; 147/9 (100 balls)	v	Southern Brave; 130/7 (100 balls)
Will Jacks 37 (22); Tymal Mills 3/33 (20 balls)		Alex Davies 35 (23); Saqib Mahmood 3/17 (20 balls)

Oval Invincibles won by 17 runs
Lord's, London
Attendance: 28,860
Umpires: Martin Saggers (Eng) and Russell Warren (Eng)
Player of the match: Saqib Mahmood (Oval Invincibles)

- Southern Brave won the toss and elected to field.

== Statistics ==
=== Most runs ===
Women
Runs	Player	Team	HS
303	Nat Sciver-Brunt	Trent Rockets	60*
271	Heather Knight	London Spirit	65*
229	Georgia Redmayne	London Spirit	66*
227	Danni Wyatt	Southern Brave	61
222	Alice Capsey	Oval Invincibles	59

- Source: ESPNcricinfo

Men
Runs	Player	Team	HS
424	James Vince	Southern Brave	90*
269	Ben Duckett	Birmingham Phoenix	92
228	Phil Salt	Manchester Originals	61
227	Nicholas Pooran	Northern Superchargers	66*
214	Jordan Cox	Oval Invincibles	61*

- Source: ESPNcricinfo

=== Most wickets ===
Women
Wickets	Player	Team	BBI
15	Linsey Smith	Northern Superchargers	3/12
13	Sarah Glenn	London Spirit	4/22
12	Jess Jonassen	Welsh Fire	3/17
11	Freya Davies	Welsh Fire	2/12
11	Marizanne Kapp	Oval Invincibles	4/11
11	Hayley Matthews	Welsh Fire	4/14
11	Emily Arlott	Birmingham Phoenix	2/19

- Source: ESPNcricinfo

Men
Wickets	Player	Team	BBI
19	Adam Zampa	Oval Invincibles	4/17
19	Tymal Mills	Southern Brave	4/16
17	Sam Curran	Oval Invincibles	5/16
15	Chris Jordan	Southern Brave	3/19
14	Tim Southee	Birmingham Phoenix	5/12

- Source: ESPNcricinfo
