= 2022 London Spirit season =

London Spirit
2022 season
- Coach: (Australia) Trevor Bayliss (Men's team) (England) Trevor Griffin (Women's team)
- Captain: (England) Eoin Morgan (Men's team) (England) Charlie Dean (Women's team)
- Overseas: (Australia) Josh Inglis (Australia) Nathan Ellis (Australia) Glenn Maxwell (Australia) Ben McDermott (Australia) Riley Meredith (Cricket West Indies) Kieron Pollard (Men's team) (New Zealand) Amelia Kerr (New Zealand) Jess Kerr (Australia) Beth Mooney (Australia) Megan Schutt (Women's team)
- Ground(s): Lord's
- The Hundred (Men's): 3rd
- The Hundred (Women's): 7th
- Most runs: Beth Mooney: 205 (Women's team); Adam Rossington: 164 (Men's team)
- Most wickets: Jordan Thompson: 14 (Men's team); Amelia Kerr: 9 (Women's team)

The 2022 season was the London Spirit's second season of the 100 ball franchise cricket, The Hundred. The season was an improvement from the previous season, with the franchise reaching the knockout stages for the first time, and the men's side finishing third overall.

== Players ==
=== Men's side ===
- **Bold** denotes players with international caps.

S/N	Name	Nat.	Date of birth (age)	Batting style	Bowling style	Notes
Batters
15	**Zak Crawley**	(England)	3 February 1998 (age 28)	Right-handed	Right-arm off break	Centrally Contracted player
16	**Eoin Morgan**	(England) (Note: Morgan has also played international cricket for Ireland.)	10 September 1986 (age 39)	Left-handed	Right-arm medium	Captain
28	**Dan Lawrence**	(England)	12 July 1997 (age 29)	Right-handed	Right-arm off break	
45	Daniel Bell-Drummond	(England)	4 August 1993 (age 33)	Right-handed	Right-arm medium	
All Rounders
8	**Liam Dawson**	(England)	1 March 1990 (age 36)	Right-handed	Slow left-arm orthodox	
25	**Ravi Bopara**	(England)	4 May 1985 (age 41)	Right-handed	Right-arm medium	
32	**Glenn Maxwell**	(Australia)	14 October 1988 (age 37)	Right-handed	Right-arm off break	Overseas player; Ruled out
44	Jordan Thompson	(England)	9 October 1996 (age 29)	Left-handed	Right-arm fast-medium	
55	**Kieron Pollard**	(Cricket West Indies)	12 May 1987 (age 39)	Right-handed	Right-arm medium	Overseas player; Ruled out
Wicketkeepers
11	Jamie Smith	(England)	12 July 2000 (age 26)	Right-handed	—	Wildcard player
17	Adam Rossington	(England)	5 May 1993 (age 33)	Right-handed	—	
47	**Ben McDermott**	(Australia)	12 December 1994 (age 31)	Right-handed	—	Overseas player
95	**Josh Inglis**	(Australia)	4 March 1995 (age 31)	Right-handed	—	Overseas player; Replacement player; Ruled out
Pace bowlers
19	Blake Cullen	(England)	19 February 2002 (age 24)	Right-handed	Right-arm fast-medium	Ruled out through injury
22	**Toby Roland-Jones**	(England)	29 January 1988 (age 38)	Right-handed	Right-arm fast-medium	Replacement player
27	Chris Wood	(England)	27 June 1990 (age 36)	Right-handed	Left-arm fast-medium	
58	**Brad Wheal**	(Scotland)	28 August 1996 (age 30)	Right-handed	Right-arm fast-medium	
72	**Nathan Ellis**	(Australia)	22 September 1994 (age 31)	Right-handed	Right-arm fast-medium	Overseas player; Replacement player
—	**Riley Meredith**	(Australia)	21 June 1996 (age 30)	Right-handed	Right-arm fast-medium	Overseas player; Ruled out through injury
—	**Mark Wood**	(England)	11 January 1990 (age 36)	Right-handed	Right-arm fast	Centrally Contracted player; Ruled out through injury
Spin bowlers
5	**Mason Crane**	(England)	18 February 1997 (age 29)	Right-handed	Right-arm leg break	

=== Women's side ===
- **Bold** denotes players with international caps.

S/N	Name	Nat.	Date of birth (age)	Batting style	Bowling style	Notes
Batters
2	Chloe Brewer	(England)	12 July 2002 (age 24)	Right-handed	Right-arm medium	Replacement player
5	**Heather Knight**	(England)	26 December 1990 (age 35)	Right-handed	Right-arm off break	Centrally Contracted player; Ruled out through injury
63	Sophie Luff	(England)	6 December 1993 (age 32)	Right-handed	Right-arm medium	
All Rounders
3	**Charlie Dean**	(England)	22 December 2000 (age 25)	Right-handed	Right-arm off break	Captain
11	Naomi Dattani	(England)	28 April 1994 (age 32)	Left-handed	Left-arm medium	
24	**Jess Kerr**	(New Zealand)	18 January 1998 (age 28)	Right-handed	Right-arm medium	Overseas player
28	Danielle Gibson	(England)	30 April 2001 (age 25)	Right-handed	Right-arm medium	
29	Grace Scrivens	(England)	10 November 2003 (age 22)	Left-handed	Right-arm off break	
48	**Amelia Kerr**	(New Zealand)	13 October 2000 (age 25)	Right-handed	Right-arm leg break	Overseas player
88	Alice Monaghan	(England)	20 March 2000 (age 26)	Right-handed	Right-arm medium	
Wicketkeepers
6	**Beth Mooney**	(Australia)	14 January 1994 (age 32)	Left-handed	—	Overseas player
17	Amara Carr	(England)	17 April 1994 (age 32)	Right-handed	—	
37	Nat Wraith	(England)	3 October 2001 (age 24)	Right-handed	—	
Pace bowlers
8	Grace Ballinger	(England)	3 April 2002 (age 24)	Left-handed	Left-arm medium	
27	**Megan Schutt**	(Australia)	15 January 1993 (age 33)	Right-handed	Right-arm fast-medium	Overseas player
61	**Freya Davies**	(England)	27 October 1995 (age 30)	Right-handed	Right-arm fast-medium	
Spin bowlers
25	Nancy Harman	(England)	11 July 1999 (age 27)	Right-handed	Right-arm leg break	

== Group fixtures ==
=== Fixtures (Men) ===
4 August 2022
18:30 (N)
Scorecard

London Spirit; 171/6 (100 balls)	v	Oval Invincibles (H); 168/7 (100 balls)
Eoin Morgan 47 (29); Sunil Narine 2/25 (20 balls)		Hilton Cartwright 42 (23); Nathan Ellis 3/28 (20 balls)

London Spirit won by 3 runs
The Oval, London
Umpires: Nick Cook (Eng) and David Millns (Eng)
Player of the match: Nathan Ellis (London Spirit)

- Oval Invincibles won the toss and elected to field.
- Points: London Spirit 2, Oval Invincibles 0.

8 August 2022
18:30 (N)
Scorecard

(H) London Spirit; 160/6 (100 balls)	v	Manchester Originals; 108 (98 balls)
Zak Crawley 41 (34); Paul Walter 2/18 (20 balls)		Phil Salt 36 (34); Jordan Thompson 4/21 (20 balls)

London Spirit won by 52 runs
Lord's, London
Umpires: Neil Mallender (Eng) and Russell Warren (Eng)
Player of the match: Jordan Thompson (London Spirit)

- London Spirit won the toss and elected to bat.
- Points: London Spirit 2, Manchester Originals 0.

12 August 2022
18:30 (N)
Scorecard

London Spirit; 147/6 (100 balls)	v	Southern Brave (H); 138/7 (100 balls)
Daniel Bell-Drummond 46 (33); Michael Hogan 2/31 (20 balls)		Ross Whiteley 52 (33); Jordan Thompson 2/32 (20 balls)

London Spirit won by 9 runs
Rose Bowl, Southampton
Umpires: Nick Cook (Eng) and Ben Debenham (Eng)
Player of the match: Daniel Bell-Drummond (London Spirit)

- London Spirit won the toss and elected to bat.
- Points: London Spirit 2, Southern Brave 0.

14 August 2022
14:30
Scorecard

(H) Northern Superchargers; 143/5 (100 balls)	v	London Spirit; 147/3 (82 balls)
Faf du Plessis 56 (35); Mason Crane 2/23 (20 balls)		Adam Rossington 66 (25); Adil Rashid 1/29 (15 balls)

London Spirit won by 7 wickets
Headlingley, Leeds
Umpires: Graham Lloyd (Eng) and Rob White (Eng)
Player of the match: Adam Rossington (London Spirit)

- Northern Superchargers won the toss and elected to bat.
- Points: London Spirit 2, Northern Superchargers 0.

20 August 2022
19:00 (N)
Scorecard

London Spirit; 122 (93 balls)	v	Trent Rockets (H); 127/4 (79 balls)
Ben McDermott 30 (25); Rashid Khan 3/25 (20 balls)		Colin Munro 67* (37); Chris Wood 1/19 (15 balls)

Trent Rockets won by 6 wickets
Trent Bridge, Nottingham
Umpires: Paul Pollard (Eng) and Martin Saggers (Eng)
Player of the match: Colin Munro (Trent Rockets)

- Trent Rockets won the toss and elected to field.
- Points: Trent Rockets 2, London Spirit 0.

24 August 2022
18:30 (N)
Scorecard

(H) London Spirit; 156/6 (100 balls)	v	Welsh Fire; 139/9 (100 balls)
Dan Lawrence 43 (26); Ish Sodhi 2/19 (20 balls)		Ben Duckett 34 (19); Dan Lawrence 4/20 (20 balls)

London Spirit won by 17 runs
Lord's, London
Umpires: Hassan Adnan (Eng) and Richard Kettleborough (Eng)
Player of the match: Dan Lawrence (London Spirit)

- Welsh Fire won the toss and elected to field.
- Points: London Spirit 2, Welsh Fire 0.

27 August 2022
19:00 (N)
Scorecard

(H) London Spirit; 122/7 (100 balls)	v	Oval Invincibles; 124/4 (86 overs)
Adam Rossington 36 (22); Sam Curran 3/16 (20 balls)		Will Jacks 54 (38); Jordan Thompson 2/22 (16 balls)

Oval Invincibles won by 6 wickets
Lord's, London
Umpires: Richard Kettleborough (Eng) and Nigel Llong (Eng)
Player of the match: Sam Curran (Oval Invincibles)

- London Spirit won the toss and elected to bat.
- Points: Oval Invincibles 2, London Spirit 0.

30 August 2022
18:30 (N)
Scorecard

(H) London Spirit; 139/6 (100 balls)	v	Birmingham Phoenix; 140/9 (100 balls)
Ravi Bopara 45 (20); Tom Helm 4/17 (20 balls)		Matthew Wade 81 (42); Mason Crane 4/24 (20 balls)

Birmingham Phoenix won by 1 wicket
Lord's, London
Umpires: Mike Burns (Eng) and Martin Saggers (Eng)
Player of the match: Matthew Wade (Birmingham Phoenix)

- Birmingham Phoenix won the toss and elected to field.
- Points: Birmingham Phoenix 2, London Spirit 0.

=== Fixtures (Women) ===
Due to the shortened women's competition, London Spirit didn't play against Manchester Originals.

12 August 2022
15:00
Scorecard

London Spirit; 155/4 (100 balls)	v	Southern Brave (H); 159/4 (94 balls)
Beth Mooney 97* (55); Amanda-Jade Wellington 3/30 (20 balls)		Danni Wyatt 65 (34); Danielle Gibson 2/27 (20 balls)

Southern Brave won by 6 wickets
Rose Bowl, Southampton
Umpires: Tom Lungley (Eng) and Sue Redfern (Eng)
Player of the match: Danni Wyatt (Southern Brave)

- London Spirit won the toss and elected to bat.
- Points: Southern Brave 2, London Spirit 0.

14 August 2022
11:00
Scorecard

(H) Northern Superchargers; 127/4 (100 balls)	v	London Spirit; 122/7 (100 balls)
Bess Heath 57 (34); Amelia Kerr 2/27 (20 balls)		Sophie Luff 39* (30); Alice Davidson-Richards 2/20 (20 balls)

Northern Superchargers won by 5 runs
Headlingley, Leeds
Umpires: Claire Polosak (Aus) and Neil Pratt (Eng)
Player of the match: Bess Heath (Northern Superchargers)

- London Spirit won the toss and elected to field.
- Points: Northern Superchargers 2, London Spirit 0.

20 August 2022
15:30
Scorecard

(H) Trent Rockets; 142/4 (100 balls)	v	London Spirit; 124/6 (100 balls)
Bryony Smith 63 (44); Amelia Kerr 2/23 (20 balls)		Naomi Dattani 38* (34); Nat Sciver 2/20 (15 balls)

Trent Rockets won by 18 runs
Trent Bridge, Nottingham
Umpires: Neil Bainton (Eng) and Sarah Bartlett (Eng)
Player of the match: Bryony Smith (Trent Rockets)

- London Spirit won the toss and elected to field.
- Points: Trent Rockets 2, London Spirit 0.

24 August 2022
15:00
Scorecard

Welsh Fire; 119/9 (100 balls)	v	London Spirit (H); 122/2 (86 balls)
Sarah Bryce 33 (25); Freya Davies 3/25 (20 balls)		Beth Mooney 61* (39); Claire Nicholas 1/18 (15 balls)

London Spirit won by 8 wickets
Lord's, London
Umpires: Anna Harris (Eng) and Billy Taylor (Eng)
Player of the match: Beth Mooney (London Spirit)

- Welsh Fire won the toss and elected to bat.
- Points: London Spirit 2, Welsh Fire 0.

27 August 2022
15:30
Scorecard

(H) London Spirit; 80 (97 balls)	v	Oval Invincibles; 82/1 (58 balls)
Amelia Kerr 31 (31); Mady Villiers 4/12 (20 balls)		Lauren Winfield-Hill 44* (28); Grace Scrivens 1/23 (18 balls)

Oval Invincibles won by 9 wickets
Lord's, London
Umpires: James Middlebrook (Eng) and Sue Redfern (Eng)
Player of the match: Mady Villiers (Oval Invincibles)

- Oval Invincibles won the toss and elected to field.
- Points: Oval Invincibles 2, London Spirit 0.

30 August 2022
15:00
Scorecard

Birmingham Phoenix; 82 (94 balls)	v	London Spirit (H); 83/6 (97 balls)
Evelyn Jones 24 (30); Danielle Gibson 2/12 (15 balls)		Naomi Dattani 28* (29); Emily Arlott 2/9 (20 balls)

London Spirit won by 4 wickets
Lord's, London
Umpires: Ben Debenham (Eng) and Anna Harris (Eng)
Player of the match: Naomi Dattani (London Spirit)

- London Spirit won the toss and elected to field.
- Points: London Spirit 2, Birmingham Phoenix 0.

== Standings ==
=== Women ===
Pos	Team	Pld	W	L	T	NR	Pts	NRR
1	Oval Invincibles	6	5	1	0	0	10	1.098
2	Southern Brave	6	5	1	0	0	10	0.806
3	Trent Rockets	6	3	3	0	0	6	0.101
4	Birmingham Phoenix	6	3	3	0	0	6	−0.031
5	Northern Superchargers	6	3	3	0	0	6	−0.119
6	Manchester Originals	6	2	4	0	0	4	−0.478
7	London Spirit	6	2	4	0	0	4	−0.557
8	Welsh Fire	6	1	5	0	0	2	−0.681

Source: BBC Sport, ESPN Cricinfo

advances to Final
advances to the Eliminator

=== Men ===
Pos	Team	Pld	W	L	T	NR	Pts	NRR
1	Trent Rockets	8	6	2	0	0	12	0.576
2	Manchester Originals	8	5	3	0	0	10	0.908
3	London Spirit	8	5	3	0	0	10	0.338
4	Birmingham Phoenix	8	5	3	0	0	10	−0.172
5	Oval Invincibles	8	4	4	0	0	8	0.385
6	Northern Superchargers	8	4	4	0	0	8	0.009
7	Southern Brave	8	3	5	0	0	6	−0.593
8	Welsh Fire	8	0	8	0	0	0	−1.442

Source: BBC Sport, ESPN Cricinfo

advances to Final
advances to the Eliminator

== Knockout stages ==
=== Men ===
==== Eliminator ====
2 September 2022
18:30 (N)
Scorecard

London Spirit; 150/7 (100 balls)	v	Manchester Originals; 151/5 (89 balls)
Ben McDermott 59 (38); Paul Walter 3/29 (20 balls)		Laurie Evans 72 (34); Nathan Ellis 2/32 (19 balls)

Manchester Originals won by 5 wickets
Rose Bowl, Southampton
Umpires: Russell Warren (Eng) and Alex Wharf (Eng)
Player of the match: Laurie Evans (Manchester Originals)

- London Spirit won the toss and elected to bat.
