= List of London Spirit cricketers =

London Spirit were formed in 2019, and played their first Hundred match in the 2021 season of The Hundred against Birmingham Phoenix for both the Men's team and the Women's team. Hundred matches are classed as Twenty20 matches and so have Twenty20 status or Women's Twenty20 status. The players in this list have all played at least one Hundred match for the London Spirit Men's or Women's team.

Players are listed in order of appearance, where players made their debut in the same match, they are ordered by batting order. Players in Bold were overseas players for the London Spirit.

== Key ==
**General**

- ♠ – Captain
- † – Wicket-keeper
- **First** – Year of debut for London Spirit
- **Last** – Year of latest match played for London Spirit
- **Mat** – Number of matches played for London Spirit
- **Win%** – Winning percentage

**Batting**

- **Inn** – Number of innings batted
- **NO** – Number of innings not out
- **Runs** – Runs scored in career
- **HS** – Highest score
- **100** – Centuries scored
- **50** – Half-centuries scored
- **Avg** – Runs scored per dismissal
- * – Batsman remained not out

**Bowling**

- **Balls** – Balls bowled in career
- **Wkt** – Wickets taken in career
- **BBI** – Best bowling in an innings
- **BBM** – Best bowling in a match
- **Ave** – Average runs per wicket

**Fielding**

- **Ca** – Catches taken
- **St** – Stumpings effected

== List of players ==
=== Women's players ===
No.	Name	Nationality	First	Last	Mat	Runs	HS	Avg	Balls	Wkt	BBI	Ave	Ca	St
No.	Name	Nationality	First	Last	Mat	Batting			Bowling				Fielding	
1	Naomi Dattani	England	2021	2022	13	151	38*	15.10	35	2	2/23	34.00	0	0
2	**Deandra Dottin**	West Indies	2021	2026	16	209	50*	19.00	85	3	2/28	46.66	4	0
3	Heather Knight ♠	England	2021	2024	23	597	65*	33.16	90	4	2/17	24.75	3	0
4	**Deepti Sharma**	India	2021	2024	16	289	46*	57.80	310	18	3/18	17.38	3	0
5	**Chloe Tryon**	South Africa	2021	2021	7	41	9	6.83	20	0	–	–	1	0
6	Susie Rowe	England	2021	2021	3	0	0	0.00	0	0	–	–	0	0
7	Charlie Dean ♠	England	2021	2026	47	243	27	10.56	819	37	3/17	26.67	18	0
8	Amara Carr †	England	2021	2022	6	19	11*	19.00	0	0	–	–	0	2
9	Dani Gibson	England	2021	2025	39	444	41	15.31	404	20	2/10	28.35	21	0
10	Freya Davies	England	2021	2022	13	9	5	3.00	217	10	3/25	27.50	1	0
11	Alice Monaghan	England	2021	2023	14	11	4	2.20	0	0	–	–	6	0
12	Tammy Beaumont †	England	2021	2021	6	139	42	23.16	0	0	–	–	3	1
13	Sophie Munro	England	2021	2024	13	11	5*	2.75	145	6	2/20	39.66	1	0
14	Grace Scrivens	England	2021	2023	12	95	26*	23.75	83	3	1/5	32.33	0	0
15	**Beth Mooney** †	Australia	2022	2022	6	205	97*	51.25	0	–	–	–	2	2
16	**Amelia Kerr**	New Zealand	2022	2023	12	252	60*	28.00	210	19	4/13	13.84	7	0
17	Sophie Luff	England	2022	2023	7	74	39*	14.80	0	–	–	–	1	0
18	**Megan Schutt**	Australia	2022	2022	6	3	3	3.00	105	5	2/14	26.20	3	0
19	Nat Wraith	England	2022	2022	2	1	1*	–	0	–	–	–	1	0
20	Grace Ballinger	England	2022	2022	2	1	1*	–	5	0	–	–	0	0
21	Nancy Harman	England	2022	2022	1	–	–	–	0	–	–	–	1	0
22	**Grace Harris**	Australia	2023	2026	23	441	89*	22.05	65	5	3/15	19.40	16	0
23	**Richa Ghosh** †	India	2023	2023	6	107	34	17.83	0	–	–	–	7	2
24	Niamh Holland	England	2023	2023	3	9	7*	4.50	0	–	–	–	0	0
25	Sarah Glenn	England	2023	2025	25	65	17	6.50	485	29	4/22	18.79	5	0
26	Tara Norris	United States	2023	2025	19	14	11*	–	170	9	2/19	23.33	4	0
27	Lauren Filer	England	2023	2023	6	25	21*	–	70	2	1/21	59.00	2	0
28	**Meg Lanning**	Australia	2024	2024	10	170	53	17.00	0	0	–	–	3	0
29	**Georgia Redmayne** †	Australia	2024	2025	19	395	66*	24.69	0	0	–	–	7	5
30	Cordelia Griffith	England	2024	2025	19	256	50	14.22	0	0	–	–	5	0
31	**Erin Burns**	Australia	2024	2024	2	2	2*	2.00	15	2	2/6	8.00	0	0
32	Eva Gray	England	2024	2025	19	67	28	11.17	270	18	4/19	20.33	3	0
33	Abbey Freeborn	England	2024	2024	5	5	3	2.50	0	0	–	–	0	0
34	Kira Chathli	England	2025	2025	9	220	69	24.44	0	0	–	–	1	0
35	**Charli Knott**	Australia	2025	2025	9	196	47	24.50	95	5	1/7	29.60	1	0
36	Issy Wong	England	2025	2025	9	49	24*	8.17	165	8	2/26	27.25	0	0
37	Bex Tyson	England	2025	2025	4	1	1*	–	55	3	2/6	23.33	0	0
38	Kate Coppack	England	2025	2025	2	8	8*	–	10	0	–	–	2	0
39	Amy Jones †	England	2026	2026	8	155	49	19.37	0	0	–	–	5	2
40	Marie Kelly	England	2026	2026	8	117	45	14.62	0	0	–	–	0	0
41	**Marizanne Kapp**	South Africa	2026	2026	7	187	57*	31.16	135	11	3/12	11.90	2	0
42	**Nadine de Klerk**	South Africa	2026	2026	8	165	41*	27.50	141	9	2/13	24.00	1	0
43	Charis Pavely	England	2026	2026	8	41	18	10.25	60	2	1/6	40.50	5	0
44	Katie George	England	2026	2026	8	15	8	5.00	80	4	3/25	31.25	4	0
45	Josie Groves	England	2026	2026	2	2	2	2.00	9	0	–	–	0	0
46	Hannah Rainey	Scotland	2026	2026	5	4	3	4.00	65	5	2/12	16.00	0	0
47	Sterre Kalis	Netherlands	2026	2026	3	3	3	1.50	0	0	–	–	0	0
48	Trudy Johnson	England	2026	2026	3	–	–	–	20	0	–	–	1	0
49	Lucy Higham	England	2026	2026	3	8	8*	–	5	0	–	–	1	0
50	Seren Smale	England	2026	2026	1	17	17	17.00	0	0	–	–	0	0

=== Men's players ===
No.	Name	Nationality	First	Last	Mat	Runs	HS	Avg	Balls	Wkt	BBI	Ave	Ca	St
No.	Name	Nationality	First	Last	Mat	Batting			Bowling				Fielding	
1	Zak Crawley	England	2021	2023	14	260	64	23.63	0	0	–	–	6	0
2	**Josh Inglis** †	Australia	2021	2022	9	176	72	22.00	0	0	–	–	4	0
3	Dan Lawrence ♠	England	2021	2024	25	399	93	18.13	147	6	4/20	35.83	8	0
4	Eoin Morgan ♠	England	2021	2022	17	281	47	20.07	0	0	–	–	4	0
5	Joe Denly	England	2021	2021	6	66	35	13.20	10	0	–	–	2	0
6	Ravi Bopara	England	2021	2024	21	272	45	18.13	89	8	4/21	14.75	7	0
7	**Mohammad Nabi**	Afghanistan	2021	2021	6	33	10	8.25	95	6	2/19	17.83	2	0
8	Roelof van der Merwe	Netherlands	2021	2021	8	77	25*	–	100	5	2/35	35.60	2	0
9	Blake Cullen	England	2021	2021	8	18	15*	9.00	120	10	3/37	20.40	1	0
10	Chris Wood	England	2021	2023	12	6	5*	3.00	205	8	4/28	40.62	3	0
11	**Mohammad Amir**	Pakistan	2021	2021	5	18	16	9.00	77	3	2/34	44.00	0	0
12	Adam Rossington †	England	2021	2024	25	471	66	20.47	0	0	–	–	18	5
13	Mason Crane	England	2021	2026	19	7	3*	7.00	313	20	4/24	22.85	8	0
14	Luis Reece	England	2021	2021	2	24	24	12.00	5	0	–	–	0	0
15	Joe Cracknell	England	2021	2021	3	55	35	18.33	0	0	–	–	2	0
16	Brad Wheal	Scotland	2021	2022	6	–	–	–	103	10	4/17	14.50	1	0
17	**David Wiese**	Namibia	2021	2021	2	3	2	3.00	20	0	–	–	0	0
18	Jade Dernbach	Italy	2021	2021	1	–	–	–	15	0	–	–	0	0
19	**Glenn Maxwell**	Australia	2022	2022	4	116	43*	38.66	25	2	1/6	8.00	4	0
20	**Kieron Pollard**	West Indies	2022	2022	6	113	34*	113.00	5	0	–	–	3	0
21	Jordan Thompson	England	2022	2023	15	54	27	5.40	251	17	4/21	23.35	4	0
22	Liam Dawson	England	2022	2025	33	227	45*	18.91	535	34	3/10	20.64	7	0
23	**Nathan Ellis**	Australia	2022	2024	22	23	7	4.60	391	18	3/16	32.88	9	0
24	Daniel Bell-Drummond	England	2022	2024	7	130	46	18.57	0	–	–	–	2	0
25	**Ben McDermott**	Australia	2022	2022	5	157	59	31.40	0	–	–	–	1	0
26	Michael Pepper †	England	2023	2024	11	96	27	8.72	0	–	–	–	6	0
27	**Matthew Wade** †	Australia	2023	2023	8	117	42	19.50	0	–	–	–	3	0
28	**Daryl Mitchell**	New Zealand	2023	2023	8	136	57	27.20	41	3	2/16	25.33	3	0
29	Matt Critchley	England	2023	2024	13	115	37	16.42	95	4	1/11	41.50	1	0
30	Daniel Worrall	Australia	2023	2025	19	5	3*	5.00	312	18	3/24	20.55	2	0
31	**Tim Southee**	New Zealand	2023	2023	1	3	3	3.00	20	3	3/23	7.66	0	0
32	**Shimron Hetmyer**	West Indies	2024	2024	8	126	44	18.00	0	0	–	–	4	0
33	**Andre Russell**	West Indies	2024	2024	8	90	37*	12.85	64	1	1/22	117.00	5	0
34	Olly Stone	England	2024	2025	10	17	7	3.40	150	9	2/14	23.55	3	0
35	Ryan Higgins	England	2024	2025	3	40	28	13.33	10	0	–	–	0	0
36	Ollie Pope	England	2024	2025	11	131	52*	18.71	0	0	–	–	3	0
37	Keaton Jennings	England	2024	2025	7	147	61*	29.40	0	0	–	–	4	0
38	Richard Gleeson	England	2024	2025	11	3	3	3.00	175	13	3/30	24.23	1	0
39	**David Warner**	Australia	2025	2025	8	200	71	28.57	0	0	–	–	0	0
40	**Kane Williamson** ♠	New Zealand	2025	2025	8	204	53	25.50	0	0	–	–	5	0
41	Wayne Madsen	Italy	2025	2025	1	10	10	10.00	0	0	–	–	0	0
42	**Ashton Turner**	Australia	2025	2025	8	177	30	25.28	22	1	1/7	38.00	3	0
43	John Simpson †	England	2025	2025	1	1	1	1.00	0	0	–	–	0	0
44	Luke Wood	England	2025	2025	7	7	5	7.00	124	3	1/17	61.66	1	0
45	Jamie Smith †	England	2025	2025	7	203	52	29.00	0	0	–	–	4	0
46	Sean Dickson	South Africa	2025	2025	6	50	18*	16.66	0	0	–	–	1	0
47	Jamie Overton	England	2025	2026	14	151	31	21.57	215	14	3/30	25.07	9	0
48	Jafer Chohan	England	2025	2025	3	–	–	–	40	1	1/36	78.00	1	0
49	**Lhuan-dre Pretorius**	South Africa	2026	2026	8	190	64	23.75	0	0	–	–	2	0
50	Kiran Carlson	Wales	2026	2026	1	19	19	19.00	0	0	–	–	0	0
51	James Rew †	England	2026	2026	5	57	26	14.25	0	0	–	–	1	0
52	Liam Livingstone ♠	England	2026	2026	8	233	69	29.12	82	2	2/14	68.00	3	0
53	**Dewald Brevis**	South Africa	2026	2026	8	212	55*	35.33	0	0	–	–	2	0
54	James Coles	England	2026	2026	8	73	30*	14.60	105	5	1/13	29.40	5	0
55	David Willey	England	2026	2026	8	127	83*	31.75	135	8	3/20	25.00	4	0
56	**Adam Milne**	New Zealand	2026	2026	8	5	4*	–	149	8	2/23	25.12	3	0
57	**Adam Zampa**	Australia	2026	2026	5	0	0	0.00	75	3	2/27	44.33	0	0
58	Tymal Mills	England	2026	2026	1	–	–	–	5	0	–	–	0	0
59	Jonny Bairstow †	England	2026	2026	7	136	56	19.42	0	0	–	–	5	1
60	Andrew Tye	Australia	2026	2026	4	7	7	3.50	50	3	2/35	35.33	0	0
61	Joe Moores	England	2026	2026	3	11	11	11.00	0	0	–	–	1	0
62	Matthew Fisher	England	2026	2026	1	–	–	–	10	1	1/25	25.00	0	0
63	Henry Crocombe	England	2026	2026	2	–	–	–	25	2	1/8	17.00	0	0

== See also ==
- London Spirit
- The Hundred
