= 2021 London Spirit season =

London Spirit
2021 season
- Coach: Trevor Griffin (women); Shane Warne (men)
- Captain: Heather Knight (women); Eoin Morgan (men)
- Overseas: Deandra Dottin; Deepti Sharma; Chloe Tryon; (women); Josh Inglis; Mohammad Amir; Mohammad Nabi; David Wiese; (men)
- Ground(s): Lord's
- Women: 4th
- Men: 8th
- Most runs: Heather Knight: 214 (women); Josh Inglis: 173 (men)
- Most wickets: Deepti Sharma: 10 (women); Blake Cullen: 10 (men)
- Most catches: Danielle Gibson: 6 (women); Ravi Bopara: 6 (men)

The 2021 season was London Spirit's first season of the new franchise 100 ball cricket, The Hundred.

== Players ==
- **Bold** denotes players with international caps
- Ages given as of 21 July 2021, the date the first match was played in the tournament

=== Women's side ===
No.	Name	Nationality	Date of birth (age)	Batting style	Bowling style	Notes
Batters
4	**Susie Rowe**	England	13 April 1987 (aged 34)	Right-handed	Right-arm medium	
5	**Heather Knight**	England	26 December 1990 (aged 30)	Right-handed	Right-arm off break	Captain; Centrally contracted player
28	Aylish Cranstone	England	28 August 1994 (aged 26)	Left-handed	Left-arm medium	
All-rounders
3	Charlie Dean	England	22 December 2000 (aged 20)	Right-handed	Right-arm off break	
6	**Deepti Sharma**	India	24 August 1997 (aged 23)	Left-handed	Right-arm off break	Overseas player
8	Danielle Gibson	England	30 April 2001 (aged 20)	Right-handed	Right-arm medium	
11	Naomi Dattani	England	28 April 1994 (aged 27)	Left-handed	Left-arm medium	
15	**Deandra Dottin**	West Indies	21 June 1991 (aged 30)	Right-handed	Right-arm fast-medium	Marquee player; Overseas player
25	**Chloe Tryon**	South Africa	25 January 1994 (aged 27)	Right-handed	Slow left-arm orthodox	Overseas player
88	Alice Monaghan	England	20 March 2000 (aged 21)	Right-handed	Right-arm medium	
Wicket-keepers
12	**Tammy Beaumont**	England	11 March 1991 (aged 30)	Right-handed	—	
17	Amara Carr	England	17 April 1994 (aged 27)	Right-handed	—	
Pace bowlers
22	Sophie Munro	England	31 August 2001 (aged 19)	Right-handed	Right-arm medium	
61	**Freya Davies**	England	27 October 1995 (aged 25)	Right-handed	Right-arm fast-medium	
Spin bowlers
29	Grace Scrivens	England	10 November 2003 (aged 17)	Left-handed	Right-arm off break	

=== Men's side ===
No.	Name	Nationality	Date of birth (age)	Batting style	Bowling style	Notes
Batsmen
6	**Joe Denly**	England	16 March 1986 (aged 35)	Right-handed	Right-arm leg break	
15	**Zak Crawley**	England	3 February 1998 (aged 23)	Right-handed	Right-arm off break	Centrally contracted player
16	**Eoin Morgan**	England (Note: Morgan also played international cricket for Ireland)	10 September 1986 (aged 34)	Left-handed	Right-arm medium	Captain
24	Joe Cracknell	England	16 March 2000 (aged 21)	Right-handed	—	Replacement player
28	**Dan Lawrence**	England	12 July 1997 (aged 24)	Right-handed	Right-arm off break	Local Icon player
All-rounders
7	**Mohammad Nabi**	Afghanistan	1 January 1985 (aged 36)	Right-handed	Right-arm off break	Overseas player
10	Luis Reece	England	4 August 1990 (aged 30)	Left-handed	Left-arm medium	
25	**Ravi Bopara**	England	4 May 1985 (aged 36)	Right-handed	Right-arm medium	
52	**Roelof van der Merwe**	Netherlands (Note: Van der Merwe has also played international cricket for South Africa)	31 December 1984 (aged 36)	Right-handed	Slow left-arm orthodox	
96	**David Wiese**	South Africa	18 May 1985 (aged 36)	Right-handed	Right-arm fast-medium	Overseas player; Replacement player
Wicket-keepers
17	Adam Rossington	England	5 May 1993 (aged 28)	Right-handed	—	
95	Josh Inglis	Australia	4 March 1995 (aged 26)	Right-handed	—	Overseas player
Pace bowlers
1	**Jade Dernbach**	England	3 March 1986 (aged 35)	Right-handed	Right-arm fast-medium	
5	**Mohammad Amir**	Pakistan	13 April 1992 (aged 29)	Left-handed	Left-arm fast	Overseas player
8	Chris Wood	England	27 June 1990 (aged 31)	Right-handed	Left-arm fast-medium	
19	Blake Cullen	England	19 February 2002 (aged 19)	Right-handed	Right-arm fast-medium	Wildcard pick
58	**Brad Wheal**	Scotland	28 August 1996 (aged 24)	Right-handed	Right-arm fast-medium	Replacement player
—	**Mark Wood**	England	11 January 1990 (aged 31)	Right-handed	Right-arm fast	
Spin bowlers
32	**Mason Crane**	England	18 February 1997 (aged 24)	Right-handed	Right-arm leg break	

== League stage ==
=== Women's fixtures ===
23 July 2021
15:00
Scorecard

Birmingham Phoenix; 128/6 (100 balls)	v	London Spirit; 132/7 (96 balls)
Evelyn Jones 47 (41); Deandra Dottin 2/28 (20 balls)		Naomi Dattani 34 (19); Erin Burns 2/15 (20 balls)

London Spirit won by 3 wickets
Edgbaston, Birmingham
Umpires: Rob Bailey and Jasmine Naeem
Player of the match: Evelyn Jones (Birmingham Phoenix)

- London Spirit won the toss and elected to field.
- Points: London Spirit 2, Birmingham Phoenix 0.

25 July 2021
11:00
Scorecard

Oval Invincibles; 132/7 (100 balls)	v	London Spirit; 117/7 (100 balls)
Alice Capsey 59 (41); Naomi Dattani 2/23 (15 balls)		Heather Knight 40 (29); Dane van Niekerk 3/30 (20 balls)

Oval Invincibles won by 15 runs
Lord's, London
Umpires: Anna Harris and Graham Lloyd
Player of the match: Alice Capsey (Oval Invincibles)

- London Spirit won the toss and elected to field.
- Points: Oval Invincibles 2, London Spirit 0.

29 July 2021
15:00
Scorecard

Trent Rockets; 151/4 (100 balls)	v	London Spirit; 133/7 (100 balls)
Rachel Priest 76 (42); Freya Davies 1/19 (20 balls)		Heather Knight 31 (25); Lucy Higham 2/12 (15 balls)

Trent Rockets won by 18 runs
Lord's, London
Umpires: Neil Mallender and Sue Redfern
Player of the match: Rachel Priest (Trent Rockets)

- Trent Rockets won the toss and elected to bat.
- Points: Trent Rockets 2, London Spirit 0.

1 August 2021
14:30
Scorecard

London Spirit; 93 (96 balls)	v	Southern Brave; 97/3 (92 balls)
Tammy Beaumont 34 (45); Amanda-Jade Wellington 4/14 (20 balls)		Stafanie Taylor 29* (32); Deepti Sharma 2/10 (20 balls)

Southern Brave won by 7 wickets
Lord's, London
Umpires: Sarah Bartlett and Peter Hartley
Player of the match: Amanda-Jade Wellington (Southern Brave)

- Southern Brave won the toss and elected to field.
- Points: Southern Brave 2, London Spirit 0.

3 August 2021
15:00
Scorecard

Northern Superchargers; 126/5 (100 balls)	v	London Spirit; 129/3 (98 balls)
Jemimah Rodrigues 57 (44); Sophie Munro 2/20 (15 balls)		Deandra Dottin 50* (34); Linsey Smith 2/15 (20 balls)

London Spirit won by 7 wickets
Lord's, London
Umpires: Rob Bailey and Anna Harris
Player of the match: Deandra Dottin (London Spirit)

- Northern Superchargers won the toss and elected to bat.
- Points: London Spirit 2, Northern Superchargers 0.

10 August 2021
15:00
Scorecard

Manchester Originals; 127/5 (100 balls)	v	London Spirit; 131/5 (98 balls)
Emma Lamb 39 (30); Deepti Sharma 2/10 (20 balls)		Heather Knight 35 (26); Alex Hartley 3/32 (20 balls)

London Spirit won by 5 wickets
Old Trafford, Manchester
Umpires: Peter Hartley and Sue Redfern
Player of the match: Deepti Sharma (London Spirit)

- Manchester Originals won the toss and elected to bat.
- Points: London Spirit 2, Manchester Originals 0.

14 August 2021
15:30
Scorecard

London Spirit; 103/9 (100 balls)	v	Oval Invincibles; 107/2 (87 balls)
Tammy Beaumont 42 (34); Marizanne Kapp 2/12 (20 balls)		Georgia Adams 37* (34); Charlie Dean 1/24 (17 balls)

Oval Invincibles won by 8 wickets
The Oval, London
Umpires: Anna Harris and Tim Robinson
Player of the match: Georgia Adams (Oval Invincibles)

- Oval Invincibles won the toss and elected to field.
- Points: Oval Invincibles 2, London Spirit 0.

18 August 2021
15:00
Scorecard

Welsh Fire; 95/9 (100 balls)	v	London Spirit; 96/3 (58 balls)
Georgia Redmayne 35 (28); Danielle Gibson 2/10 (15 balls)		Heather Knight 34* (19); Danielle Gibson 34* (19); Hayley Matthews 2/28 (18 balls)

London Spirit won by 7 wickets
Sophia Gardens, Cardiff
Umpires: Sarah Bartlett and David Millns
Player of the match: Danielle Gibson (London Spirit)

- London Spirit won the toss and elected to field.
- Points: London Spirit 2, Welsh Fire 0.

=== Men's fixtures ===
23 July 2021
18:30 (N)
Scorecard

London Spirit; 144/6 (100 balls)	v	Birmingham Phoenix; 148/7 (97 balls)
Zak Crawley 64 (40); Adam Milne 2/18 (20 balls)		Moeen Ali 40 (30); Mohammad Amir 2/34 (17 balls)

Birmingham Phoenix won by 3 wickets
Edgbaston, Birmingham
Attendance: 12,137
Umpires: Graham Lloyd and Tim Robinson
Player of the match: Zak Crawley (London Spirit)

- Birmingham Phoenix won the toss and elected to field.
- Points: Birmingham Phoenix 2, London Spirit 0.

25 July 2021
14:30
Scorecard

Oval Invincibles	v	London Spirit

No result
Lord's, London
Umpires: Rob Bailey and Peter Hartley

- London Spirit won the toss and elected to field.
- No play was possible due to rain.
- Points: London Spirit 1, Oval Invincibles 1.

29 July 2021
18:30 (N)
Scorecard

Trent Rockets; 123/4 (100 balls)	v	London Spirit; 116/8 (100 balls)
D'Arcy Short 69* (47); Mohammad Nabi 2/20 (20 balls)		Roelof van der Merwe 25* (18); Matt Carter 3/17 (20 balls)

Trent Rockets won by 7 runs
Lord's, London
Attendance: 23,892
Umpires: Nigel Llong and Alex Wharf
Player of the match: D'Arcy Short (Trent Rockets)

- London Spirit won the toss and elected to field.
- Points: Trent Rockets 2, London Spirit 0.

1 August 2021
18:00 (N)
Scorecard

Southern Brave; 145/6 (100 balls)	v	London Spirit; 141/7 (100 balls)
Alex Davies 50 (40); Blake Cullen 2/27 (20 balls)		Josh Inglis 55 (43); George Garton 2/30 (20 balls)

Southern Brave won by 4 runs
Lord's, London
Umpires: Graham Lloyd and Russell Warren
Player of the match: Chris Jordan (Southern Brave)

- London Spirit won the toss and elected to field.
- Points: Southern Brave 2, London Spirit 0.

3 August 2021
18:30 (N)
Scorecard

Northern Superchargers; 155/3 (100 balls)	v	London Spirit; 92/9 (100 balls)
David Willey 81* (45); Mohammad Nabi 1/19 (15 balls)		Eoin Morgan 27 (22); Ben Raine 3/20 (20 balls)

Northern Superchargers won by 63 runs
Lord's, London
Umpires: Nigel Llong and Steve O'Shaughnessy
Player of the match: David Willey (Northern Superchargers)

- Northern Superchargers won the toss and elected to bat.
- Points: Northern Superchargers 2, London Spirit 0.

10 August 2021
18:30 (N)
Scorecard

London Spirit; 142/6 (100 balls)	v	Manchester Originals; 136/9 (100 balls)
Adam Rossington 46 (29); Tom Hartley 3/27 (20 balls)		Colin Ackermann 53 (40); Brad Wheal 4/17 (20 balls)

London Spirit won by 6 runs
Old Trafford, Manchester
Umpires: Rob Bailey and Martin Saggers
Player of the match: Brad Wheal (London Spirit)

- London Spirit won the toss and elected to bat.
- Points: London Spirit 2, Manchester Originals 0.

14 August 2021
19:00 (N)
Scorecard

London Spirit; 146/7 (100 balls)	v	Oval Invincibles; 147/8 (95 balls)
Eoin Morgan 41 (20); Tabraiz Shamsi 3/25 (20 balls)		Laurie Evans 67* (37); Brad Wheal 2/23 (20 balls)

Oval Invincibles won by 2 wickets
The Oval, London
Umpires: Nick Cook and Neil Mallender
Player of the match: Laurie Evans (Oval Invincibles)

- London Spirit won the toss and elected to bat.
- Points: Oval Invincibles 2, London Spirit 0.

18 August 2021
18:30 (N)
Scorecard

London Spirit; 163/5 (100 balls)	v	Welsh Fire; 165/7 (98 balls)
Josh Inglis 72 (45); Ryan Higgins 3/21 (20 balls)		Glenn Phillips 80 (35); Brad Wheal 3/30 (18 balls)

Welsh Fire won by 3 wickets
Sophia Gardens, Cardiff
Attendance: 9,261
Umpires: Nick Cook and Nigel Llong
Player of the match: Glenn Phillips (Welsh Fire)

- Welsh Fire won the toss and elected to field.
- Points: Welsh Fire 2, London Spirit 0.

== Standings ==
advanced to the final
advanced to the eliminator

=== Women ===
Pos	Team	Pld	W	L	T	NR	Pts	NRR
1	Southern Brave	8	7	1	0	0	14	1.056
2	Oval Invincibles	8	4	3	0	1	9	0.015
3	Birmingham Phoenix	8	4	4	0	0	8	0.186
4	London Spirit	8	4	4	0	0	8	0.046
5	Manchester Originals	8	3	4	0	1	7	0.016
6	Northern Superchargers	8	3	4	0	1	7	−0.041
7	Trent Rockets	8	3	4	0	1	7	−0.293
8	Welsh Fire	8	2	6	0	0	4	−1.017

Source: ESPN Cricinfo, Sky Sports

=== Men ===
Pos	Team	Pld	W	L	T	NR	Pts	NRR
1	Birmingham Phoenix	8	6	2	0	0	12	1.087
2	Southern Brave	8	5	2	0	1	11	0.034
3	Trent Rockets	8	5	3	0	0	10	0.035
4	Oval Invincibles	8	4	3	0	1	9	0.123
5	Northern Superchargers	8	3	4	0	1	7	0.510
6	Manchester Originals	8	2	4	0	2	6	−0.361
7	Welsh Fire	8	3	5	0	0	6	−0.827
8	London Spirit	8	1	6	0	1	3	−0.641

Source: ESPN Cricinfo, Sky Sports
