= 2024 London Spirit season =

London Spirit
2024 season
- Coach: Ashley Noffke (women); Trevor Baylis (men)
- Captain: Heather Knight (women); Dan Lawrence (men)
- Overseas player: Grace Harris; Meg Lanning; Georgia Redmayne; (women); Nathan Ellis; Shimron Hetmyer; Andre Russell; (men)
- Ground(s): Lord's

The 2024 season was the London Spirit's 4th season of the 100 ball franchise cricket, The Hundred.

== Players ==
=== Women's side ===
- **Bold** denotes players with international caps.

S/N	Name	Nat.	Date of birth (age)	Batting style	Bowling style	Notes
Batters
5	**Heather Knight**	England	26 December 1990 (age 35)	Right-handed	Right-arm off break	Captain
—	Cordelia Griffith	England	19 September 1995 (age 30)	Right-handed	Right-arm medium	
—	**Meg Lanning**	Australia	25 March 1992 (age 34)	Right-handed	Right-arm medium	Overseas player
All-rounders
3	**Charlie Dean**	England	22 December 2000 (age 25)	Right-handed	Right-arm off break	
17	**Grace Harris**	Australia	18 September 1993 (age 32)	Right-handed	Right-arm off break	Overseas player
27	Niamh Holland	England	27 October 2004 (age 21)	Right-handed	Right-arm medium	
28	**Danielle Gibson**	England	30 April 2001 (age 25)	Right-handed	Right-arm medium	
Wicket-keepers
—	Abigail Freeborn	England	12 November 1996 (age 29)	Right-handed	—	Wildcard player
—	**Georgia Redmayne**	Australia	8 December 1993 (age 32)	Left-handed	—	Overseas player
Pace bowlers
24	**Tara Norris**	United States	4 June 1998 (age 27)	Left-handed	Left-arm medium	UK passport
44	Sophie Munro	England	31 August 2001 (age 24)	Right-handed	Right-arm medium	
—	Ellie Anderson	England	30 October 2003 (age 22)	Right-handed	Right-arm medium	Wildcard player
—	Eva Gray	England	24 May 2000 (age 25)	Right-handed	Right-arm medium	
Spin bowlers
33	**Sarah Glenn**	England	27 August 1999 (age 26)	Right-handed	Right-arm leg break	
—	Hannah Jones	England	10 February 1999 (age 27)	Left-handed	Slow left-arm orthodox	

=== Men's side ===
S/N	Name	Nat.	Date of birth (age)	Batting style	Bowling style	Notes
Batters
15	**Zak Crawley**	England	3 February 1998 (age 28)	Right-handed	Right-arm off break	
28	**Dan Lawrence**	England	12 July 1997 (age 28)	Right-handed	Right-arm off break	Captain
45	Daniel Bell-Drummond	England	4 August 1993 (age 32)	Right-handed	Right-arm medium	
—	**Shimron Hetmyer**	West Indies	26 December 1996 (age 29)	Left-handed	—	Overseas player
—	**Ollie Pope**	England	2 January 1998 (age 28)	Right-handed	—	
All-rounders
8	**Liam Dawson**	England	1 March 1990 (age 36)	Right-handed	Slow left-arm orthodox	
20	Matt Critchley	England	13 August 1996 (age 29)	Right-handed	Right-arm leg break	
25	**Ravi Bopara**	England	4 May 1985 (age 41)	Right-handed	Right-arm medium	Wildcard player
—	Ryan Higgins	England	6 January 1995 (age 31)	Right-handed	Right-arm medium	Wildcard player
—	**Andre Russell**	West Indies	29 April 1988 (age 38)	Right-handed	Right-arm fast-medium	Overseas player
Wicket-keepers
17	Adam Rossington	England	5 May 1993 (age 33)	Right-handed	—	
19	Michael Pepper	England	25 June 1998 (age 27)	Right-handed	—	
Pace bowlers
38	**Daniel Worrall**	Australia	10 July 1991 (age 34)	Right-handed	Right-arm fast-medium	UK passport
72	**Nathan Ellis**	Australia	22 September 1994 (age 31)	Right-handed	Right-arm fast-medium	Overseas player
—	**Richard Gleeson**	England	2 December 1987 (age 38)	Right-handed	Right-arm fast-medium	
—	**Olly Stone**	England	9 October 1993 (age 32)	Right-handed	Right-arm fast	
Spin bowlers

== Standings ==
=== Women ===
Pos	Team	Pld	W	L	T	NR	Pts	NRR	Qualification
1	Welsh Fire	8	5	2	0	1	11	0.334	Advanced to the Final
2	Oval Invincibles	8	5	2	1	0	11	0.034	Advanced to the Eliminator
3	London Spirit	8	4	3	1	0	9	0.080	Advanced to the Eliminator
4	Northern Superchargers	8	3	3	1	1	8	0.942	
5	Trent Rockets	8	4	4	0	0	8	0.407	
6	Manchester Originals	8	3	4	0	1	7	−0.398	
7	Birmingham Phoenix	8	3	4	0	1	7	−0.742	
8	Southern Brave	8	1	6	1	0	3	−0.675	

Source: ESPNcricinfo

=== Men ===
Pos	Team	Pld	W	L	T	NR	Pts	NRR	Qualification
1	Oval Invincibles	8	6	2	0	0	12	0.893	Advanced to the Final
2	Birmingham Phoenix	8	6	2	0	0	12	0.402	Advanced to the Eliminator
3	Southern Brave	8	5	2	0	1	11	0.595	Advanced to the Eliminator
4	Northern Superchargers	8	5	2	0	1	11	−0.453	
5	Trent Rockets	8	4	4	0	0	8	0.348	
6	Welsh Fire	8	2	4	0	2	6	−0.215	
7	Manchester Originals	8	1	7	0	0	2	−0.886	
8	London Spirit	8	1	7	0	0	2	−0.975	

Source: ESPN Cricinfo
