= Darren Flint =

English cricketer and cricket coach

Personal information
- Full name: Darren Peter John Flint
- Born: 14 June 1970 (age 56); Basingstoke, Hampshire, England
- Batting: Right-handed
- Bowling: Slow left-arm orthodox

Domestic team information
- Years: Team
- 1993–1995: Hampshire
- 1996: Wiltshire

Career statistics
Competition	First-class
Matches	15
Runs scored	72
Batting average	8.00
100s/50s	–/–
Top score	17*
Balls bowled	2,924
Wickets	34
Bowling average	38.76
5 wickets in innings	1
10 wickets in match	–
Best bowling	5/32
Catches/stumpings	8/–
- Source: Cricinfo, 11 December 2009

Darren Peter John Flint (born 14 June 1970) is a former English first-class cricketer and the current lead spin bowling coach at Hampshire County Cricket Club.

== Career ==
Flint was born at Basingstoke in June 1970. He was educated there at Cranbourne School, before attending Queen Mary's College. He made his debut in first-class cricket for Hampshire against Gloucestershire at Bristol in the 1993 County Championship. His debut was met with success, with Flint taking figures of 5 for 32 in Gloucestershire's second innings, and scoring an unbeaten single in Hampshire's second innings to help guide them to a one wicket victory. Following his debut, he made a further nine appearances in the 1993 County Championship. Thereafter, he made just four further first-class appearances, playing twice in the 1994 County Championship and once in the 1995 County Championship. Noted as a promising young slow left-arm orthodox bowler, he took 34 wickets in his fifteen first-class matches at an average of 38.76; his best bowling figures remained those taken on debut. As a lower order batsman, he scored 72 runs with a highest score of 17 not out. Following his release by Hampshire, Flint played minor counties cricket for Wiltshire in 1996, playing eight Minor Counties Championship and three MCCA Knockout Trophy matches. He later played club cricket for Winchester in the Southern Cricket League, captaining the side in 1997.

Flint is currently a member of the coaching staff at Hampshire, holding the position of lead spin bowling coach, overseeing the development of spin bowling up to and including the professional squad. Amongst those he has coached is the leg spinner Mason Crane. Prior to his appointment at the Rose Bowl, he coached cricket in North Hampshire.
