= London Spirit =

Cricket team based in London, England

Personnel
- Captain: Charlie Dean (women); Liam Livingstone (men)
- Coach: Jon Lewis (women); Andy Flower (men)
- Overseas players: Nadine de Klerk; Deandra Dottin; Grace Harris; Marizanne Kapp; (women); Dewald Brevis; Adam Milne; Lhuan-dre Pretorius; Adam Zampa; (men)
- Owner: Marylebone Cricket Club (51%); Cricket Investor Holdings Limited (49%)

Team information
- Colours: Dark blue and black
- Founded: 2019; 7 years ago
- Home ground: Lord's
- Capacity: 30,000

History
- No. of titles: 1
- Women's title wins: 1 (2024)
- Official website: Londonspirit.com
The Hundred kit

London Spirit are a franchise 100-ball cricket team based in North London. The team represents the historic counties of Middlesex, Essex and Northamptonshire in The Hundred, which took place for the first time during the 2021 English and Welsh cricket season. Both the men's and women's teams play their home games at Lord's.

== History ==
In May 2019, it was revealed that the Hundred franchise based at Lord's would be known as the London Spirit. In August 2019 the team announced that former Australian spinner Shane Warne would be the men's team's first coach, while former Australia Women coach Lisa Keightley was appointed coach of the Women's team. By September 2019, it was known that the franchise would represent Middlesex, Essex and Northamptonshire.

The inaugural Hundred draft took place in October 2019 and saw the Spirit claim Rory Burns as their headline men's draftee, and Heather Knight as the women's headliner. They are joined by England One-Day captain Eoin Morgan and Essex's Dan Lawrence for the men's team, while Freya Davies joins Knight in the women's team.

As part of the 2025 Hundred sale, the ECB gave Marylebone Cricket Club a 51% stake in the franchise with the remaining 49% sold in an auction process. Cricket Investor Holdings Limited (known as Tech Titans) purchased 49% of the franchise with Marylebone Cricket Club retaining their stake. They took operational control on 1 October 2025.

London Spirit logo and kits 2021–25
kit

== Honours ==
=== Men's honours ===
The Hundred

- Third place: 2022

=== Women's honours ===
The Hundred

- Winners: 2024
- Third place: 2025

== Ground ==
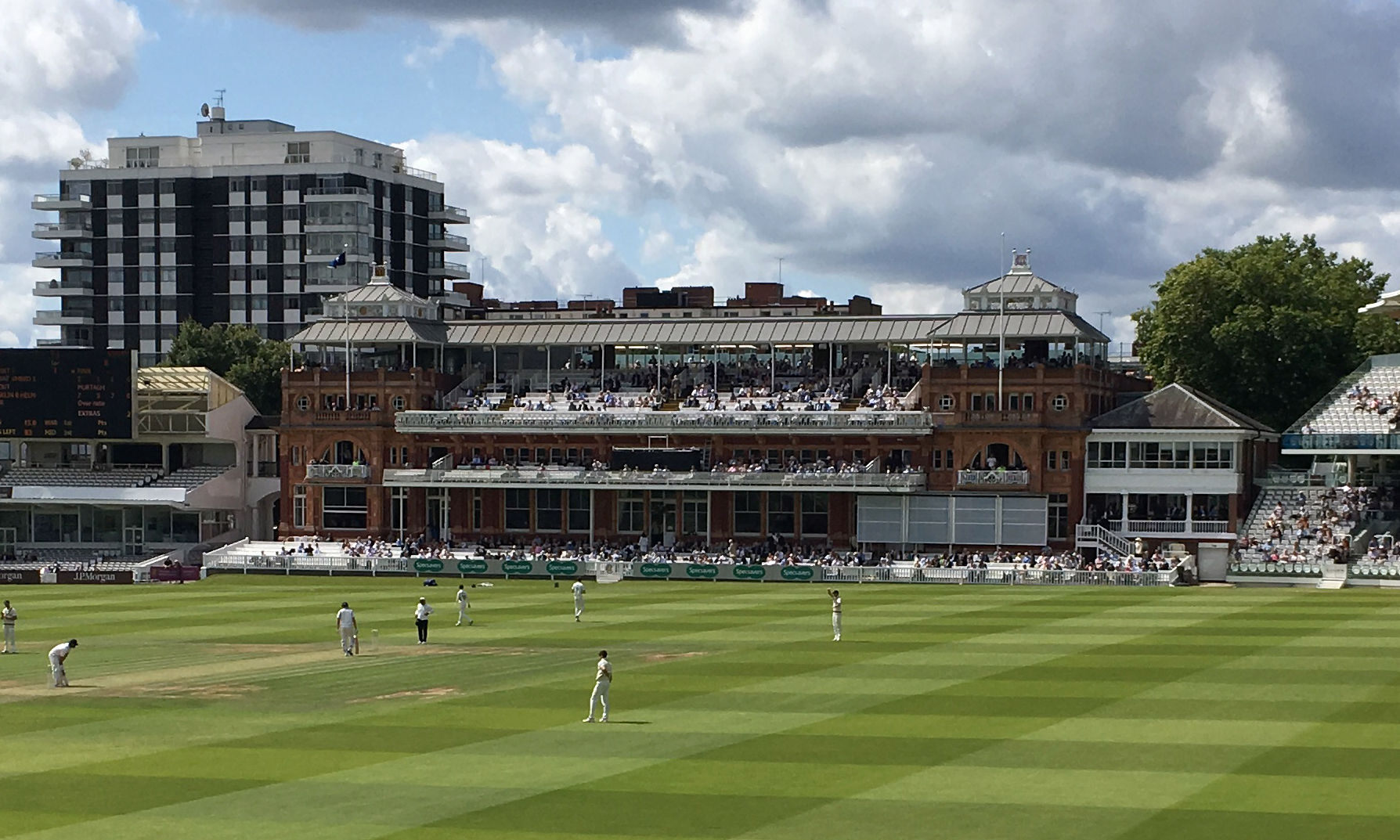
Lord's

Both the London Spirit men's and women's teams play at the home of Cricket, Lord's, in the St. John's Wood area of London. The women's team had been due to play at the home of Essex County Cricket Club, the County Ground in Chelmsford, and the home of Northamptonshire, the County Ground in Northampton but both teams were brought together at the same ground as a result of the COVID-19 pandemic.

== Current squads ==
- **Bold** denotes players with international caps.
- * denotes a player who is unavailable for rest of the season.

=== Women's team ===
No.	Name	Nationality	Date of birth (age)	Batting style	Bowling style	Notes
Batters
22	**Sterre Kalis**	Netherlands	30 August 1999 (age 26)	Right-handed	Right-arm medium	
23	Marie Kelly	England	9 February 1996 (age 30)	Right-handed	Right-arm off break	
47	**Seren Smale**	England	13 December 2004 (age 21)	Right-handed	—	
All-rounders
5	**Deandra Dottin**	West Indies	21 June 1991 (age 35)	Right-handed	Right-arm medium	Overseas player
7	**Marizanne Kapp**	South Africa	4 January 1990 (age 36)	Right-handed	Right-arm medium	Overseas player
14	Trudy Johnson	England	2 November 2006 (age 19)	Right-handed	Right-arm medium	Wildcard player
17	**Grace Harris**	Australia	18 September 1993 (age 32)	Right-handed	Right-arm off break	Overseas player
24	**Charlie Dean**	England	22 December 2000 (age 25)	Right-handed	Right-arm off break	Captain; England central contract
32	**Nadine de Klerk**	South Africa	16 January 2000 (age 26)	Right-handed	Right-arm medium	Overseas player
99	**Katie George**	England	7 April 1999 (age 27)	Right-handed	Left-arm medium	Replacement player
Wicket-keepers
40	**Amy Jones**	England	13 June 1993 (age 33)	Right-handed	—	England central contract
Pace bowlers
26	**Hannah Rainey**	Scotland	2 June 1997 (age 29)	Right-handed	Right-arm medium	Replacement player
—	**Mahika Gaur**	England (Note: Gaur has also played international cricket for the United Arab Emirates.)	9 March 2006 (age 20)	Right-handed	Left-arm medium	England central contract; Ruled out through injury
—	Phoebe Turner	England	8 August 2003 (age 23)	Right-handed	Right-arm medium	Ruled out through injury
Spin bowlers
21	Josie Groves	England	5 September 2004 (age 21)	Right-handed	Right-arm leg break	
28	**Charis Pavely**	England	25 October 2004 (age 21)	Left-handed	Slow left-arm orthodox	
54	Lucy Higham	England	17 October 1997 (age 28)	Right-handed	Right-arm off break	
—	Olivia Barnes	England	9 July 2006 (age 20)	Right-handed	Slow left-arm orthodox	Wildcard player

=== Men's team ===
No.	Name	Nationality	Date of birth (age)	Batting style	Bowling style	Notes
Batters
50	Kiran Carlson	Wales	16 May 1998 (age 28)	Right-handed	Right-arm off break	Wildcard player
52	**Dewald Brevis**	South Africa	29 April 2003 (age 23)	Right-handed	Right-arm leg break	Overseas player
—	Adam Hose	England	25 October 1992 (age 33)	Right-handed	Right-arm medium	Ruled out through injury
All-rounders
8	**Jamie Overton**	England	10 April 1994 (age 32)	Right-handed	Right-arm fast-medium	England central contract
15	**David Willey**	England	28 February 1990 (age 36)	Left-handed	Left-arm fast-medium	
23	**Liam Livingstone**	England	4 August 1993 (age 33)	Right-handed	Right-arm leg break	Captain
30	James Coles	England	2 April 2004 (age 22)	Right-handed	Slow left-arm orthodox	
Wicket-keepers
24	Joe Moores	England	15 September 2008 (age 17)	Left-handed	—	Replacement player
27	**Lhuan-dre Pretorius**	South Africa	27 March 2006 (age 20)	Right-handed	—	Overseas player
51	**Jonny Bairstow**	England	26 September 1989 (age 36)	Right-handed	—	
55	**James Rew**	England	11 January 2004 (age 22)	Left-handed	—	
Pace bowlers
9	**Matthew Fisher**	England	9 November 1997 (age 28)	Right-handed	Right-arm fast-medium	
14	Henry Crocombe	England	20 September 2001 (age 24)	Right-handed	Right-arm fast-medium	Wildcard player
19	**Andrew Tye**	Australia	12 December 1986 (age 39)	Right-handed	Right-arm fast-medium	UK passport; Replacement player
20	**Adam Milne**	New Zealand	13 April 1992 (age 34)	Right-handed	Right-arm fast	Overseas player
56	**Tymal Mills**	England	12 August 1992 (age 34)	Right-handed	Left-arm fast	Ruled out through injury
Spin bowlers
3	**Mason Crane**	England	18 February 1997 (age 29)	Right-handed	Right-arm leg break	
88	**Adam Zampa**	Australia	31 March 1992 (age 34)	Right-handed	Right-arm leg break	Overseas player

== Seasons ==
=== Women's team ===
Season	Group stage							Playoff stage		Ref.
Season	Pld	W	L	T	NR	Pts	Pos	Pld	Pos	Ref.
2021	8	4	4	0	0	8	4th	Did not progress		
2022	6	2	4	0	0	4	7th	Did not progress		
2023	8	2	4	0	2	6	6th	Did not progress		
2024	8	4	3	1	0	9	3rd	2 (Note: London Spirit women qualified for the eliminator in 2024. They played 2 games, winning the eliminator against Oval Invincibles by 8 wickets, and winning the final against Welsh Fire by 4 wickets.)	1st	
2025	8	5	3	0	0	20	3rd	1 (Note: London Spirit women qualified for the eliminator in 2025. They played 1 game, losing the eliminator against Northern Superchargers by 42 runs.)	3rd	
2026	8	2	5	1	0	10	6th	Did not progress		

=== Men's team ===
Season	Group stage							Playoff stage		Ref.
Season	Pld	W	L	T	NR	Pts	Pos	Pld	Pos	Ref.
2021	8	1	6	0	1	3	8th	Did not progress		
2022	8	5	3	0	0	10	3rd	1 (Note: London Spirit men qualified for the eliminator in 2022. They played one match, losing the playoff for the final against Manchester Originals by 5 wickets.)	3rd	
2023	8	2	4	0	2	6	7th	Did not progress		
2024	8	1	7	0	0	2	8th	Did not progress		
2025	8	3	5	0	0	12	7th	Did not progress		
2026	8	3	5	0	0	12	7th	Did not progress		

== See also ==
- List of London Spirit cricketers
- List of cricket grounds in England and Wales
- List of Test cricket grounds
