= Mason Crane =

English cricketer (born 1997)

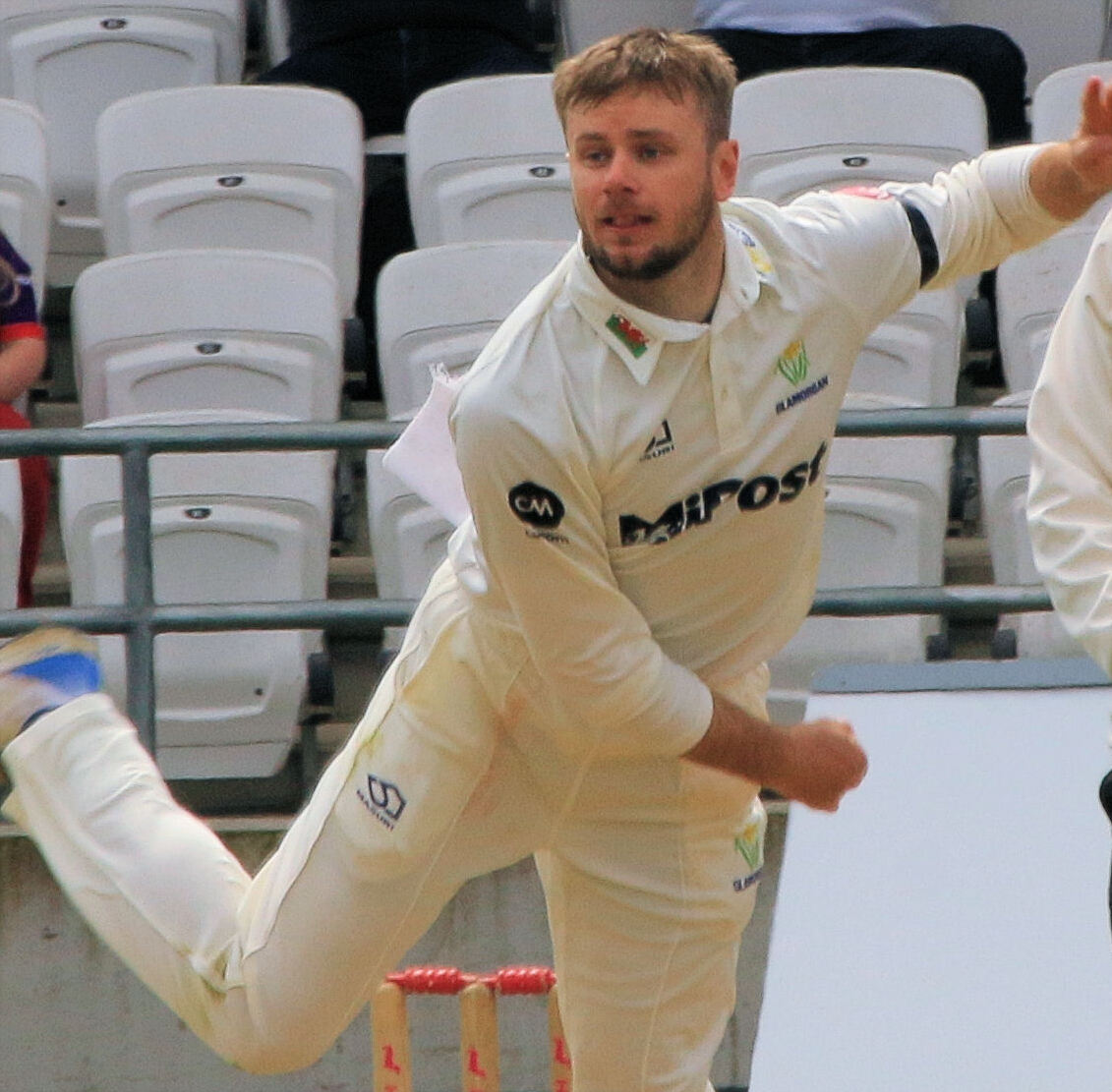
- Crane in 2024

Personal information
- Full name: Mason Sidney Crane
- Born: 18 February 1997 (age 29); Shoreham-by-Sea, West Sussex, England
- Height: 5 ft 9 in (1.75 m)
- Batting: Right-handed
- Bowling: Right-arm leg break
- Role: Bowler

International information
- National side: England
- Only Test (cap 683): 4 January 2018 v Australia
- T20I debut (cap 78): 21 June 2017 v South Africa
- Last T20I: 25 June 2017 v South Africa
- T20I shirt no.: 44

Domestic team information
- Years: Team
- 2015–2024: Hampshire (squad no. 32)
- 2017: New South Wales
- 2021–2023: London Spirit
- 2022: → Sussex (loan) (squad no. 24)
- 2023: Sunrisers Eastern Cape
- 2024: → Glamorgan (loan)
- 2024–present: Glamorgan (squad no. 3)
- 2024–2025: Welsh Fire
- 2026: London Spirit

Career statistics
Competition	Test	T20I	FC	T20
Matches	1	2	83	131
Runs scored	6	–	1,775	225
Batting average	3.00	–	20.40	17.30
100s/50s	0/0	–	2/4	0/0
Top score	4	–	114*	25
Balls bowled	288	48	12,867	2,604
Wickets	1	1	211	154
Bowling average	193.00	62.00	40.17	22.62
5 wickets in innings	0	0	8	0
10 wickets in match	0	0	0	0
Best bowling	1/193	1/38	6/19	4/20
Catches/stumpings	0/–	0/–	20/–	36/–
- Source: Cricinfo, 27 September 2026

Mason Sidney Crane (born 18 February 1997) is an English cricketer who plays for Glamorgan. He previously played for Hampshire. He is a right-arm leg break bowler and right-handed batsman. He also played for the England national cricket team in 2017 & 2018.

He was recalled by England in October 2026.

== Domestic career ==
Crane was a member of the Hampshire County Cricket Club academy since the age of 14, where he was under the guidance of former Hampshire spinner Rajesh Maru at Lancing College, West Sussex. Under Maru's guidance he impressed straight away despite concerns about his height and quickly he became a leg break bowler with good control as well as a googly.

Crane has also been a member of Sussex Cricket League club Worthing Cricket Club since the age of 10, playing for the club's junior teams and also claiming 54 wickets for the Worthing CC 1st XI.

Crane's good performance in the academy and guidance from Maru and Hampshire academy spin coach Darren Flint earned him a call-up to the England U17 development team. In the summer of 2014 Crane's continued good performances made him a regular in the Hampshire 2nd XI and earned him a call-up to the England U19s for the tour of Dubai and later the teams tour of Australia to play the Australia U19s. Crane was also called up to the first team squad for their trip to Worcestershire in the LV County Championship. Crane's performances in Australia were good, taking 2 wickets in 3 games in a series that England would lose 3–2.

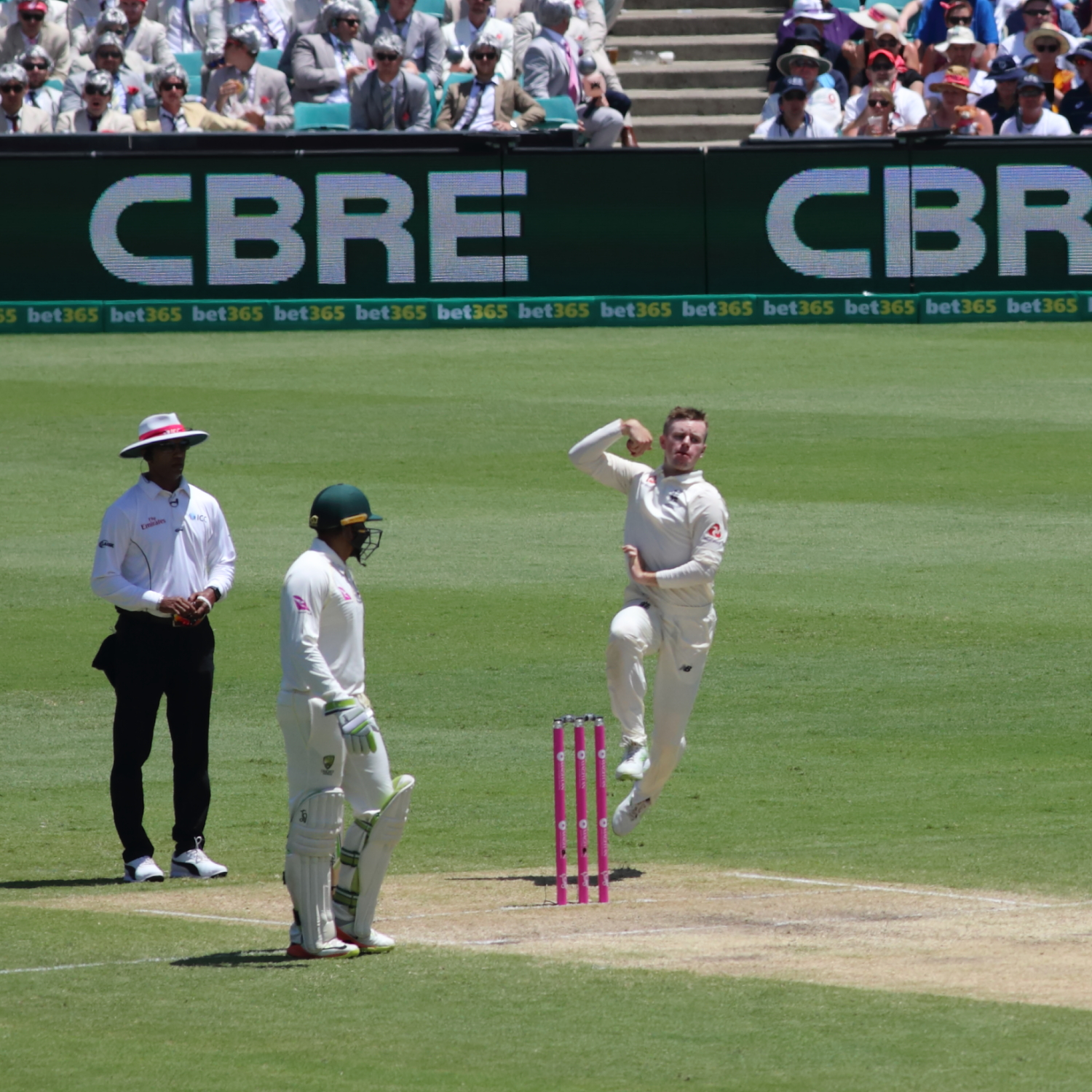
Crane bowling during his debut test during the 2017–18 Ashes

On 10 July 2015, Crane made his Hampshire 1st team debut in a Natwest T20 Blast fixture against Surrey at the Ageas Bowl. Coming on in the 9th over of Surrey's innings with them chasing 187 runs for victory, Crane bowled well dismissing Kumar Sangakkara and Vikram Solanki in his allocated 4 over to finish with figures of 2/35 as Hampshire won by 29 runs.

In December 2015 he was named in England's squad for the 2016 Under-19 Cricket World Cup.

In October 2016 Crane went to Sydney to play for Gordon District Cricket Club in Sydney Grade Cricket.

In March 2017, Crane made his debut for New South Wales, becoming the first overseas player to play for them since Imran Khan in 1984, where he took match figures of 5/116 and remained 15 not out when batting.

In April 2022, Crane was bought by the London Spirit for the 2022 season of The Hundred. That month, he was loaned to Sussex for a month.

In March 2024, Crane joined Glamorgan on a season-long loan. In July that year he signed a three-year contract with the Welsh county.

On 20 June 2026, Crane made his maiden first-class century, scoring 106 for Glamorgan against Surrey at Sophia Gardens.

== International career ==
In June 2017, Crane was named in England's Twenty20 International (T20I) squad for the series against South Africa. He made his T20I debut for England against South Africa on 21 June 2017. In August 2017, he was named in England's Test squad for their series against the West Indies, but he did not play. In September 2017, he was named in England's Test squad for the 2017–18 Ashes series. He made his Test debut in the fifth Test against Australia on 4 January 2018. On Test debut, he took his maiden & only test wicket by dismissing Usman Khawaja, having previously had an appeal against the same player turned down because of a no ball.

On 29 May 2020, Crane was named in a 55-man group of players to begin training ahead of international fixtures starting in England following the COVID-19 pandemic. In January 2021, Crane was named as a reserve player in England's Test squad for their series against India.

He was recalled by England in October 2026 when he was named in the squad to tour Pakistan for a one day tournament.
