= Dani Gibson =

English cricketer

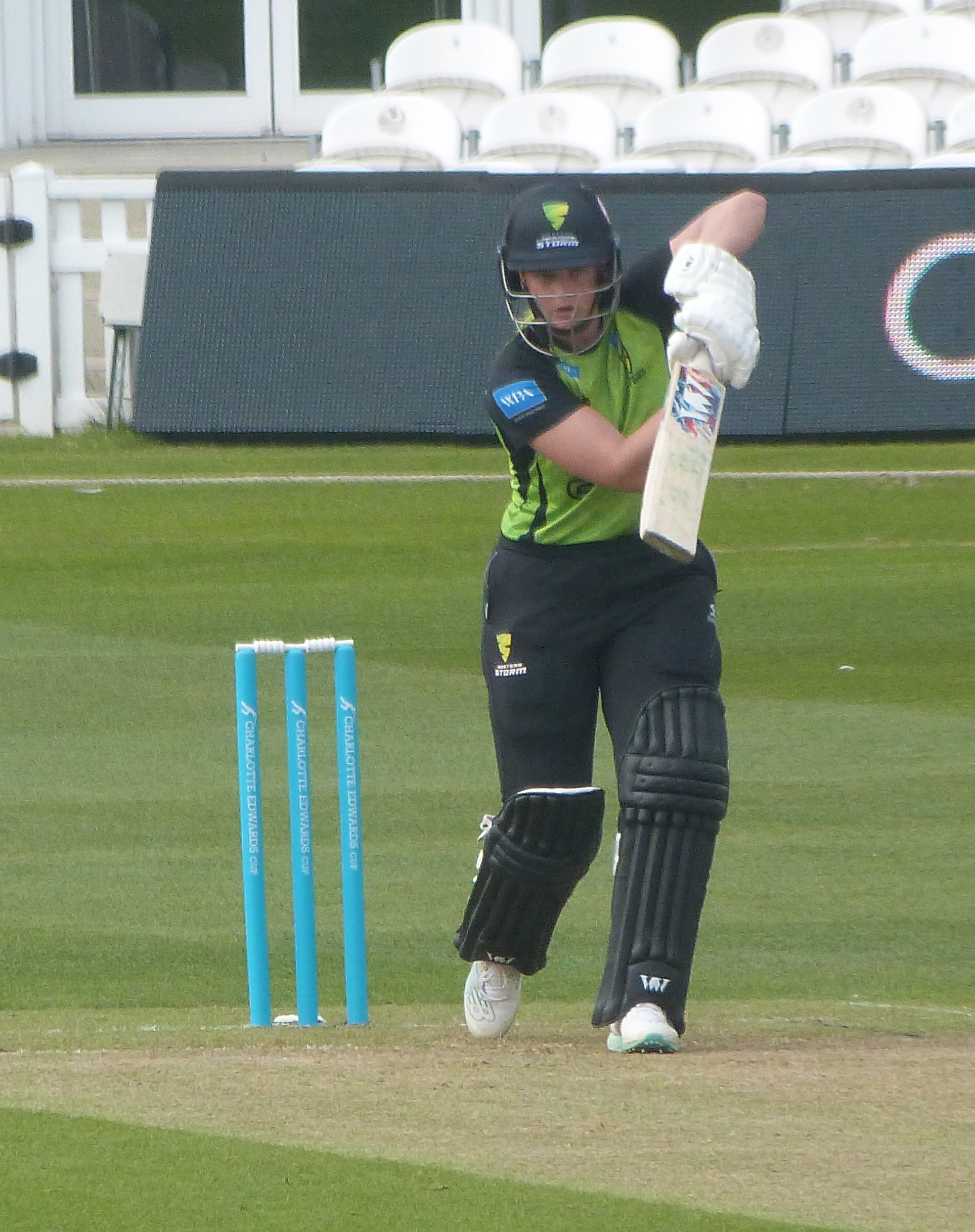
- Gibson batting for Western Storm in May 2023

Personal information
- Full name: Danielle Rose Gibson
- Born: 30 April 2001 (age 25); Cheltenham, Gloucestershire, England
- Nickname: Gibbo
- Batting: Right-handed
- Bowling: Right-arm medium
- Role: All-rounder

International information
- National side: England (2023–present)
- ODI debut (cap 155): 10 May 2026 v New Zealand
- Last ODI: 3 September 2026 v Ireland
- T20I debut (cap 58): 1 July 2023 v Australia
- Last T20I: 5 July 2026 v Australia
- T20I shirt no.: 66

Domestic team information
- Years: Team
- 2014–2017: Gloucestershire
- 2017–2024: Western Storm
- 2018–2022: Wales
- 2021–2025: London Spirit
- 2023–2024: Gloucestershire
- 2023/24: Adelaide Strikers
- 2025–present: Somerset
- 2026: Sunrisers Leeds

Career statistics
Competition	WODI	WT20I	WLA	WT20
Matches	3	35	58	163
Runs scored	21	212	1,103	1,688
Batting average	10.50	16.30	22.97	17.22
100s/50s	0/0	0/0	0/9	0/2
Top score	19	41*	77	62
Balls bowled	60	474	1,628	2,049
Wickets	2	19	58	104
Bowling average	24.50	31.52	21.86	23.43
5 wickets in innings	0	0	1	0
10 wickets in match	0	0	0	0
Best bowling	1/21	3/14	5/17	4/23
Catches/stumpings	1/–	11/–	22/–	77/–
Medal record
Women's cricket
Representing England
T20 World Cup
Runner-up	2026 England
- Source: CricketArchive, 6 July 2026

Danielle Rose Gibson (born 30 April 2001) is an English cricketer who currently plays for Somerset, Sunrisers Leeds. An all-rounder, she plays as a right-arm medium bowler and right-handed batter. She has previously played for Wales, Western Storm and Adelaide Strikers.

She made her international debut for England in July 2023, in a T20I against Australia.

== Early life ==
Gibson was born on 30 April 2001 in Cheltenham, Gloucestershire.

== Domestic career ==
Gibson made her county debut in 2014, for Gloucestershire against Oxfordshire. She scored a duck and did not bowl. The following season, she hit her List A high score, scoring 73 in a victory over Buckinghamshire, and took 3/17 in the same match. In the 2016 Women's County Championship, she was Gloucestershire's leading wicket-taker, with 13 wickets at an average of 9.69, with a best of 4/9 from 7 overs against Norfolk. She had another strong season in 2017, especially with the ball, and took her maiden county five-for, 5/17, against Cornwall.

Gibson moved to Wales ahead of the 2018 season, and was their joint-leading wicket-taker in the 2018 Women's Twenty20 Cup, with 9 wickets. In 2019, she hit her first half-century for her new side, scoring 57 in a victory over Essex. She played two matches for Wales in the 2021 Women's Twenty20 Cup, scoring 32 runs and taking 3 wickets. Ahead of the 2023 season, she re-joined Gloucestershire.

Gibson was also in the Western Storm squad in the Women's Cricket Super League between 2017 and 2019. Whilst she did not play a match in 2017, in 2018 she was ever-present as her side reached the semi-final. She took 5 wickets at an average of 27.20. She only appeared in one match in 2019 due to injury.

In 2020, Gibson continued to play for Western Storm in the 2020 Rachael Heyhoe Flint Trophy. She appeared in one match, scoring 33* in a victory over Sunrisers. In December 2020, it was announced that Gibson was one of the 41 female cricketers that had signed a full-time domestic contract. She continued playing for Storm in 2021, taking 3 wickets in the Rachael Heyhoe Flint Trophy and 7 wickets in the Charlotte Edwards Cup. She also played for London Spirit in the inaugural season of The Hundred, scoring 108 runs at a strike rate of 180.00, as well as taking 3 wickets. She was ever-present for Western Storm in 2022, across the Charlotte Edwards Cup and the Rachael Heyhoe Flint Trophy. She took six wickets in the Charlotte Edwards Cup at an average of 25.66, as well as scoring 96 runs. She was Storm's second-highest run-scorer in the Rachael Heyhoe Flint Trophy, with 176 runs including half-centuries against Northern Diamonds and North West Thunder, as well as taking five wickets. She also played every match for London Spirit in The Hundred, scoring 46 runs and taking five wickets.

Ahead of the 2023 season, she was named as vice-captain of Western Storm, and captained her first game for the side in the absence of regular captain Sophie Luff on 29 April 2023. She played 12 matches for the side that season, across the Rachael Heyhoe Flint Trophy and the Charlotte Edwards Cup, and was the side's leading wicket-taker in the Charlotte Edwards Cup, with eight wickets at an average of 21.25, alongside scoring two half-centuries. She also played six matches for London Spirit in The Hundred, and was the side's leading run-scorer with 146 runs, alongside four wickets. In 2024, she played seven matches for Western Storm, across the Rachael Heyhoe Flint Trophy and the Charlotte Edwards Cup, scoring one half-century.

In September 2023, she was drafted by Adelaide Strikers for the 2023–24 Women's Big Bash League season. She played 13 matches, scoring 115 runs and taking 10 wickets as her side won the competition.

Gibson has also played for various England Academy and Development teams, beginning in 2014.

In November 2024, Gibson joined Somerset.

== International career ==
In January 2023, Gibson was named in an England squad for the first time, as a travelling reserve for the 2023 ICC Women's T20 World Cup. In June 2023, she was named in England's squad for their Test match against Australia. She made her T20I debut for England against Australia, on 1 July 2023. She played all three matches in the series, taking two wickets. She was later named in the ODI squad in the same series, but did not play a match. Later that summer, she was named in England's squad for their series against Sri Lanka. She played all three T20Is during the series, taking one wicket and scoring 21 from 15 deliveries in the 3rd T20I. In December 2023, she was awarded her first central contract with England. She played one match during England's tour of India that same month. She was named in the England squad for the 2024 ICC Women's T20 World Cup. In December 2024, Gibson was included in the England squad for the 2025 Women's Ashes series in Australia. In April 2026, after over a year out of international cricket with injury, Gibson was named in the England squad for the 2026 ICC Women's T20 World Cup. She made her ODI debut against New Zealand on 10 May 2026.
