= Dan Lawrence =

English cricketer (born 1997)

Daniel Lawrence
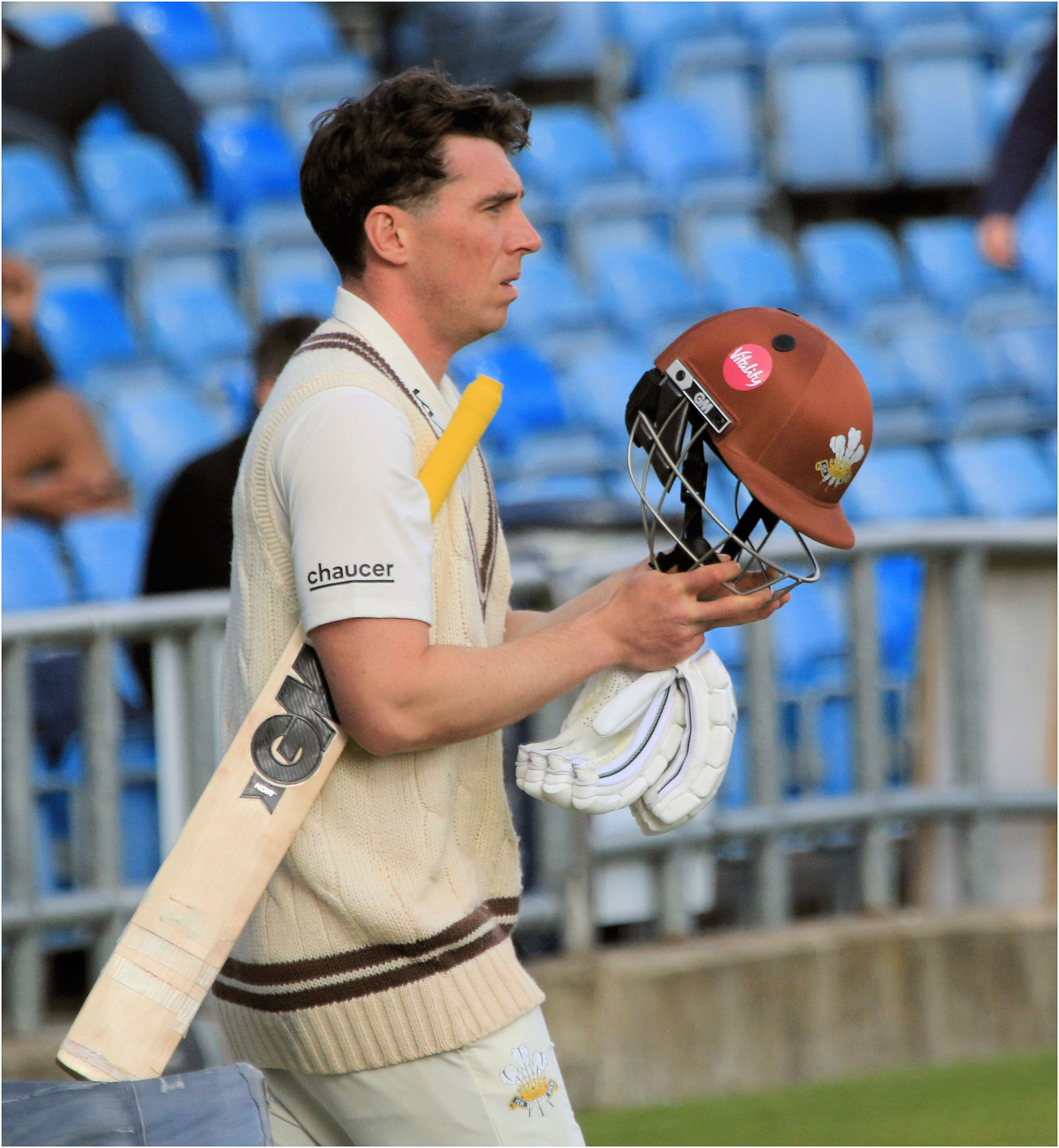
- Lawrence in 2026

Personal information
- Full name: Daniel William Lawrence
- Born: 12 July 1997 (age 29); Whipps Cross, London, England
- Height: 5 ft 11 in (1.80 m)
- Batting: Right-handed
- Bowling: Right-arm off break
- Role: Middle-order batter

International information
- National side: England (2021–present)
- Test debut (cap 697): 14 January 2021 v Sri Lanka
- Last Test: 9 September 2026 v Pakistan

Domestic team information
- Years: Team
- 2015–2023: Essex
- 2020/21: Brisbane Heat
- 2021–2025: London Spirit
- 2023: Dubai Capitals
- 2023/24–2024/25: Melbourne Stars
- 2024–2025/26: Desert Vipers
- 2024–present: Surrey
- 2026: Paarl Royals
- 2026: Sunrisers Leeds

Career statistics
Competition	Test	FC	LA	T20
Matches	17	158	33	206
Runs scored	858	9,188	963	4,297
Batting average	29.58	39.94	33.20	26.36
100s/50s	0/7	25/40	2/6	1/24
Top score	91	218	115	120*
Balls bowled	304	5,404	687	1,333
Wickets	5	67	13	70
Bowling average	30.00	47.22	53.61	24.95
5 wickets in innings	0	0	0	0
10 wickets in match	0	0	0	0
Best bowling	1/0	4/91	3/35	4/20
Catches/stumpings	10/–	110/–	11/–	76/0
- Source: Cricinfo, 17 November 2026

Daniel William Lawrence (born 12 July 1997) is an English professional cricketer who plays for Surrey in the County Championship. He has played internationally for the England Test cricket team. In domestic cricket, he represents Surrey having previously represented Essex. Lawrence made his Test debut in 2021. He plays as a right-handed middle-order batsman, and occasional offbreak bowler.

== Early life ==
Lawrence's father, Mark, has worked as a groundman for Chingford in the Essex Premier League. His brother, Tom, is a professional wrestler under the ring name David Wreckham.

== Early, domestic and T20 career ==
Lawrence played his youth cricket at Chingford Cricket Club, where his father is groundsman. He used various batting techniques when playing youth cricket.

Lawrence made his first-class debut for Essex against Kent in April 2015. At the age of 17 years and 290 days, and in only his second first-class appearance, Lawrence made a century against Surrey becoming the third youngest batsmen to score a century in the County Championship. Lawrence's batting was instrumental in helping Essex win promotion to the County Championship First Division, and in their first season back in the upper division, to win the Championship in 2017. In 2017 was named the Cricket Writers' Club Young Cricketer of the Year, and made his debut for England Lions.

Lawrence bowls off-spin with an unusual action.

In April 2022, he was bought by the London Spirit for the 2022 season of The Hundred. In April 2023, he was retained by the London Spirit for the 2023 season of The Hundred.

In June 2023, it was announced that Lawrence would join Surrey on an initial three-year deal ahead of the 2024 season.

Lawrence scored his maiden first-class double century for Surrey in their County Championship match against Hampshire at The Oval on 7 June 2026, making 218 off 190 balls including hitting five 6s and 31 4s. Three days later, he compiled 101 off 64 balls becoming the second player in County Championship history to score a double century and a hundred at better than a run a ball in the same match, as well as the third Surrey batter to score a double ton and a century in the same first-class game.

=== Big Bash League ===
In November 2020, Lawrence joined the Brisbane Heat as an international recruit, replacing Tom Banton.

In the 2023/2024 season of the Big Bash League (BBL13) Lawrence joined the Melbourne Stars as an international recruit.

== International career ==
In December 2015, Lawrence was named in England's squad for the 2016 Under-19 Cricket World Cup. In the first match of the tournament, Lawrence scored a match-winning 174 runs off 150 balls against Fiji, the highest score by an English batsman in a youth ODI.

Lawrence put in a man-of-the-match performance as the England Lions wrapped up a series win against a Cricket Australia XI in February 2020. He finished with 4-28, following a quickfire 50 not out in the first match of the series.

A fortnight later, Lawrence's fine form for the Lions continued with an impressive 190 runs and three wickets in a four-day tour match against the same opposition.

On 29 May 2020, Lawrence was named in a 55-man group of players to begin training ahead of international fixtures starting in England following the COVID-19 pandemic. On 17 June 2020, Lawrence was included in England's 30-man squad to start training behind closed doors for the Test series against the West Indies. On 4 July 2020, Lawrence was named as one of the nine reserve players for the first Test match of the series. However, on 10 August 2020, Lawrence had to leave the England bio-secure bubble after his mother died.

In December 2020, Lawrence was named in England's Test squad for their series against Sri Lanka. He made his international debut in the first Test of this series scoring an impressive 73 in the first innings before being caught at short leg.

Lawrence took his maiden international wicket of New Zealand's Will Young caught by Ollie Pope during day 2 of the England vs New Zealand second Test match.

In July 2021, Lawrence was named in England's ODI squad for their series against Pakistan, after the original squad for the tour was forced to withdraw following positive tests for COVID-19.

In November 2021, Lawrence was named in England's Test squads for the 2021-22 Ashes series against Australia, however he played in no matches during the series that England would eventually lose 4–0.

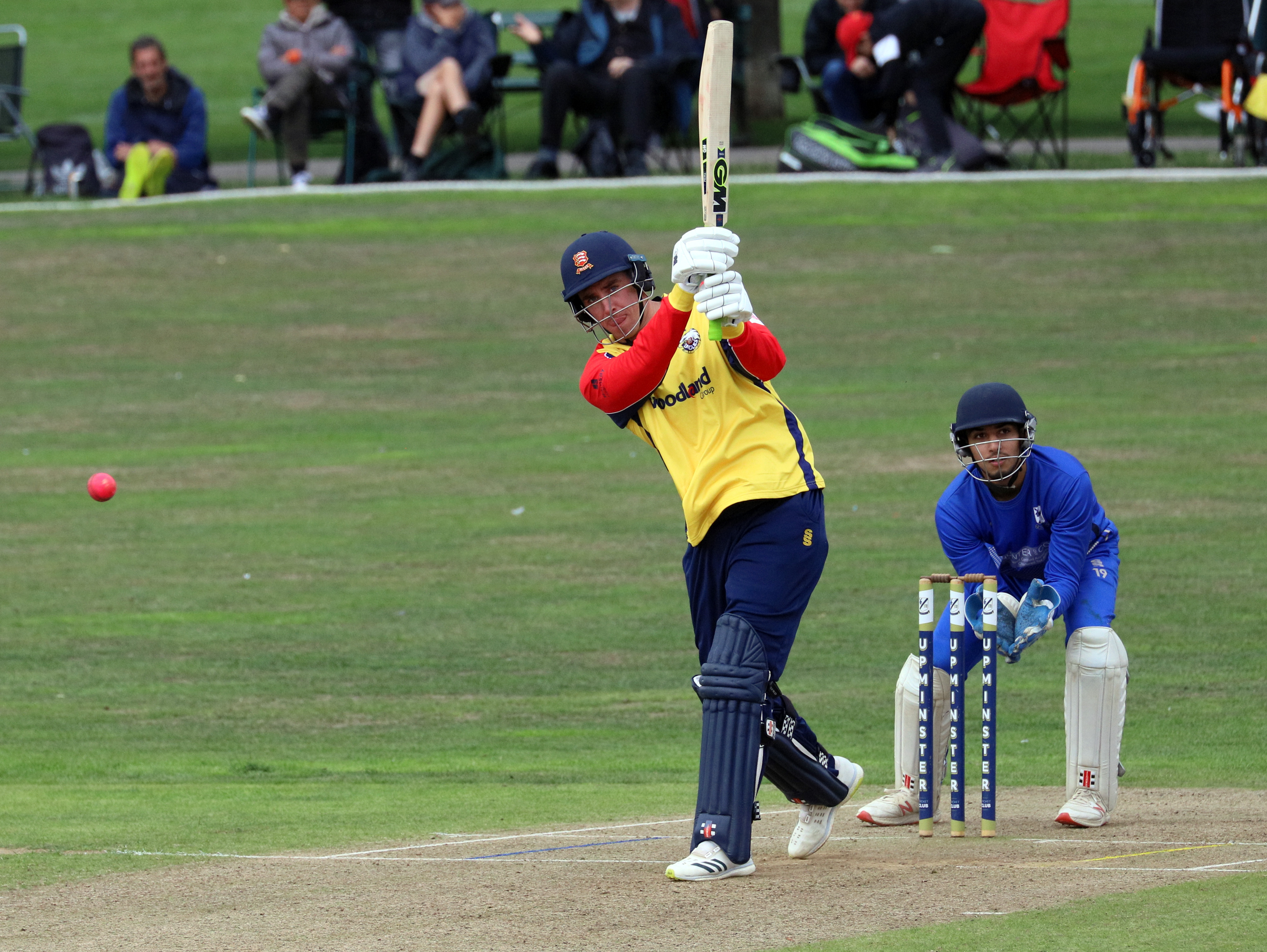
Lawrence batting for Essex in 2022

In February 2022, Lawrence was named in England's Test squad for their series against the West Indies. Before the series, he played in the England vs West Indies presidential XI where he scored 83 and 48 and took 2 wickets. The match ended in a draw. Lawrence reached a Test best score of 91 in the Barbados Test, before being caught off the final ball of day.

Lawrence in 2025.

In August 2026, Lawrence was recalled to the England side by returning captain Joe Root for the first test against Pakistan, scoring 51 in his first innings.
