= 2026 The Hundred season =

Sixth season of The Hundred

- Dates: 21 July – 16 August 2026
- Administrator: England and Wales Cricket Board
- Cricket format: 100-ball cricket
- Tournament format(s): Group stage and knockout
- Champions: W: Trent Rockets (1st title); M: Manchester Super Giants (1st title); The Hundred Helix: Trent Rockets (1st title)
- Participants: W: 8 M: 8
- Matches: 68; W: 34; M: 34
- Player of the series: W: Annabel Sutherland (Sunrisers Leeds); M: Tim Seifert (Manchester Super Giants)
- Most runs: W: Annabel Sutherland (Sunrisers Leeds) (315); M: Mitch Marsh (Sunrisers Leeds) (416)
- Most wickets: W: Samantha Bates (Trent Rockets) (13); Deepti Sharma (Sunrisers Leeds) (13); Tilly Corteen-Coleman (Southern Brave) (13); M: Josh Tongue (Manchester Super Giants) (14); Richard Gleeson (MI London) (14)
- Official website: The Hundred

The 2026 The Hundred season was the sixth season of The Hundred, a professional franchise 100-ball cricket tournament involving eight men's and women's teams located in major cities across the United Kingdom.

The previous year's women's tournament was won for the first time by the Northern Superchargers, while the men's Oval Invincibles won their third consecutive title.

Trent Rockets women and Manchester Super Giants men won their respective titles for the first time.

== Background ==
=== Finance ===
In late 2025, the ECB finalised deals that valued the eight teams at over £975 million. This restructuring was designed to secure the long-term financial health of the game, with over £500 million set to be reinvested into English and Welsh cricket, including a £50 million commitment to grassroots initiatives.

The 2026 season is the first where TeamCos—consisting of the investors and host venues—assumes full operational control. The buyers include a mix of Indian Premier League (IPL) owners, American private equity firms, and tech entrepreneurs. The completed partnerships for the 2026 season are as follows:

- London Spirit: A consortium of Silicon Valley tech entrepreneurs (including executives from Google and Microsoft) bought the 49% stake for £145m (the highest valuation).
- Oval Invincibles: Reliance Industries (owners of Mumbai Indians) bought the 49% stake for £60m.
- Manchester Originals: RPSG Group (owners of Lucknow Super Giants) took a 70% stake for £81m, with Lancashire retaining 30%.
- Northern Superchargers: Sun TV Network (owners of Sunrisers Hyderabad) purchased 100% of the team for £100m.
- Birmingham Phoenix: Knighthead Capital (owners of Birmingham City FC) acquired 49% for £40m.
- Welsh Fire: Sanjay Govil (owner of Washington Freedom) bought 50% for £40m.
- Southern Brave: GMR Group (co-owners of Delhi Capitals) bought 49% and is also taking over the host county, Hampshire.
- Trent Rockets: Cain & Ares Management jointly bought 49% for just under £40m.

=== Competition format ===
As in previous editions, eight city-based teams will compete for the men's and women's titles during 21 July to 16 August 2026.

The teams will play a total of 64 matches in the group stage (32 men's, 32 women's). All matches will be held on the same day at the same grounds, with one ticket granting access to both men's and women's contests.

Each team will play four matches at home and four away, including one match against every other side in the competition and a bonus match against their nearest regional rivals. After the league stage, the top three teams will progress to the knockout stage to decide the champions. The second- and third-placed teams will face each other in the eliminator at The Oval in London. The winner of the eliminator then met the league-topping team in the final at Lord's.

Eliminator	Final
	First-placed team
Second-placed team	Winner of Eliminator
Third-placed team

=== Player selection process ===
For the 2026 season of The Hundred, player recruitment is conducted through a structured, three-stage system designed to balance competitive fairness with strategic flexibility for teams.

==== Pre-auction signings and retention ====
Each franchise may make up to four pre-auction signings or retentions between mid-November and the end of January. Of these, a maximum of three can be direct signings limited to overseas players or England centrally contracted players, while at least one must be a retention from the existing squad, which can include domestic players as well. Teams may include up to two England centrally contracted players and up to two overseas players among their pre-auction signings. No "right to match (RTM)" option is available at this stage.

To maintain balance and competitiveness, pre-auction signings reduce each team's available salary cap ahead of the auction according to a tiered cumulative deduction model. For the men's competition, deductions range from £350,000 for one signing to £950,000 for four signings. In the women's competition, corresponding deductions range from £130,000 to £360,000.

==== Auction ====
Following the direct signing window, an auction will be held on 11 & 12 March to complete squad formation. Teams are required to recruit the remaining players within their salary cap: 16–18 players for men's squads and 15 for women's squads. For the 2026 season, the overall salary pot is set at £2.05 million for men's teams and £880,000 for women's teams, reflecting increased investment in player payments.

==== Vitality Wildcard ====
After the main auction, the Vitality Wildcard offers teams an additional mechanism to recruit players based on strong performances in the domestic T20 Blast competitions. Players who are not selected in the main auction can still earn contracts through this pathway, reinforcing the link between domestic form and participation in The Hundred.

== Teams and venues ==
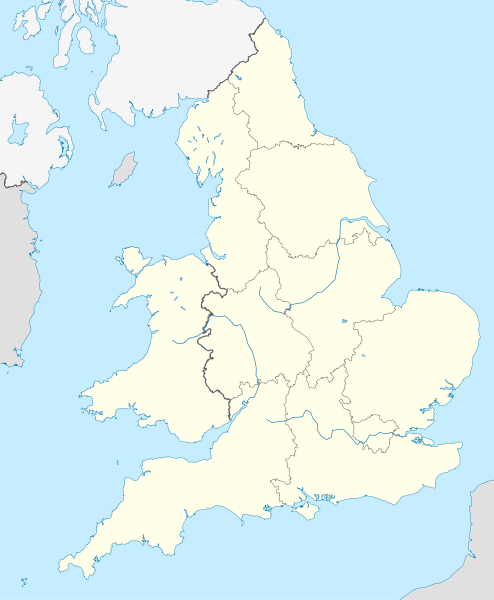
Venues in England and Wales

With the acquisition by Indian Premier League team, Oval Invincibles rebranded as MI London, whereas as Northern Superchargers to Sunrisers Leeds, while Manchester Originals were rebranded as Manchester Super Giants. All remaining teams who took part in the 2025 season also returned for the 2026 season.

Team	Home ground	Men's coach	Women's coach
Birmingham Phoenix	Edgbaston, Birmingham	Shane Bond	Alistair Maiden
London Spirit	Lord's, London	Andy Flower	Jon Lewis
Manchester Super Giants	Old Trafford, Manchester	Justin Langer	Matthew Mott
MI London	The Oval, London	Kieron Pollard	Lisa Keightley
Southern Brave	Rose Bowl, Southampton	Hemang Badani	Jonathan Batty
Sunrisers Leeds	Headingley, Leeds	Daniel Vettori	Adrian Birrell
Trent Rockets	Trent Bridge, Nottingham	Peter Moores	Chris Read
Welsh Fire (Welsh: Tân Cymreig)	Sophia Gardens, Cardiff	Mike Hussey	Michael Klinger

== Squads ==
=== Women's ===
Team captains are in bold.

Squads contracted for the 2026 The Hundred season
Birmingham Phoenix	London Spirit	Manchester Super Giants	MI London	Southern Brave	Sunrisers Leeds	Trent Rockets	Welsh Fire
Signings / Retentions
Alice Capsey; Lauren Filer; Lucy Hamilton; **Ellyse Perry**	**Charlie Dean**; Mahika Gaur; Grace Harris; Marizanne Kapp	Sophie Ecclestone; **Meg Lanning**; Smriti Mandhana	Amelia Kerr; Hayley Matthews; Danni Wyatt-Hodge	Lauren Bell; Maia Bouchier; Jemimah Rodrigues; Laura Wolvaardt	Kate Cross; Phoebe Litchfield; Annabel Sutherland	Sophia Dunkley; **Ashleigh Gardner**; Kim Garth; Nat Sciver-Brunt	Freya Kemp; Georgia Wareham; Georgia Voll
Auction
Tammy Beaumont; Phoebe Brett; Annerie Dercksen; Eva Gray; Cordelia Griffith; Alana King; Emma Lamb; Esmae MacGregor; Eve O'Neill; Davina Perrin; Linsey Smith; Jemima Spence	Deandra Dottin; Josie Groves; Lucy Higham; Amy Jones; Sterre Kalis; Marie Kelly; Nadine de Klerk; Charis Pavely; Seren Smale; Phoebe Turner	Grace Ballinger; Maitlan Brown; Kathryn Bryce; Jo Gardner; Richa Ghosh; Ryana MacDonald-Gay; Paige Scholfield; Grace Scrivens; Rebecca Tyson; Mady Villiers; Nat Wraith	**Hollie Armitage**; Nicola Carey; Kira Chathli; Alice Davidson-Richards; Kirstie Gordon; Danielle Gregory; Chinelle Henry; Alice Monaghan; Kalea Moore; Tara Norris; Alexa Stonehouse; Eleanor Threlkeld	Ellie Anderson; Tilly Corteen-Coleman; Daisy Gibb; Sarah Glenn; Jodi Grewcock; Phoebe Franklin; Lizelle Lee; **Sophie Molineux**; Rebecca Odgers; Issy Wong	Hannah Baker; Claudie Cooper; **Dani Gibson**; Jess Jonassen; Cassidy McCarthy; Florence Miller; Deepti Sharma; Rachel Slater; Bryony Smith; Maddie Ward; Lauren Winfield-Hill	Georgia Adams; Samantha Bates; Georgia Elwiss; Bess Heath; Grace Johnson; Emma Jones; Katie Levick; Ailsa Lister; Beth Mooney; Charley Phillips; Millie Taylor	Emily Arlott; Sarah Bryce; **Sophie Devine**; Heather Graham; Ella McCaughan; Fi Morris; Abi Norgrove; Grace Potts; Sophia Smale; Rhianna Southby; Grace Thompson
Wildcard Picks
Fatima Sana; Mary Taylor	Olivia Barnes; Trudy Johnson	Beth Langston; Mia Rogers	Kate Coppack; Francesca Sweet	Naomi Dattani; Katherine Fraser	Darcey Carter; Sophia Turner	Eve Jones; Amu Surenkumar	Georgia Davis; Niamh Holland

==== Replacements ====
- Birmingham Phoenix:
  - Meg Austin replaced Cordelia Griffith due to injury.
  - Kayla Reyneke replaced Fatima Sana for two matches due to international commitments.
- London Spirit:
  - Katie George replaced Mahika Gaur due to injury.
  - Hannah Rainey replaced Phoebe Turner due to injury.
- MI London:
  - Ella Claridge replaced Danni Wyatt-Hodge due to injury.
- Southern Brave:
  - Charli Knott replaced Jemimah Rodrigues due to injury.
- Sunrisers Leeds:
  - Emily Windsor replaced Florence Miller due to injury.
  - Katie Jones replaced Maddie Ward due to injury.
  - Chloe Skelton replaced Rachel Slater due to injury.
  - Tilly Kesteven replaced Emily Windsor due to injury.
- Trent Rockets:
  - Sophie Munro replaced Grace Johnson due to injury.
  - Sophie Luff replaced Ailsa Lister due to injury.
- Welsh Fire:
  - Orla Prendergast replaced Sophie Devine due to injury.

=== Men's ===
Team captains are in bold.

Squads contracted for the 2026 The Hundred season
Birmingham Phoenix	London Spirit	Manchester Super Giants	MI London	Southern Brave	Sunrisers Leeds	Trent Rockets	Welsh Fire
Signings / Retentions
Rehan Ahmed; Jacob Bethell; **Donovan Ferreira**; Mitchell Owen	Dewald Brevis; **Liam Livingstone**; Jamie Overton; Adam Zampa	Noor Ahmad; Jos Buttler; Liam Dawson; Heinrich Klaasen	**Sam Curran**; Will Jacks; Rashid Khan; Nicholas Pooran	Jofra Archer; Jamie Smith; Marcus Stoinis; Tristan Stubbs	Harry Brook; Brydon Carse; Nathan Ellis; Mitchell Marsh	Tom Banton; Tim David; Ben Duckett; Mitchell Santner	Marco Jansen; Rachin Ravindra; **Phil Salt**; Chris Woakes
Auction
Ethan Brookes; Joe Clarke; Scott Currie; Laurie Evans; Saqib Mahmood; Mustafizur Rahman; Will Smeed; Usman Tariq; Jordan Thompson; Chris Wood	Jonny Bairstow; James Coles; Mason Crane; Matthew Fisher; Adam Hose; Tymal Mills; Adam Milne; Lhuan-dre Pretorius; James Rew; David Willey	Gus Atkinson; Sonny Baker; Leus du Plooy; Tom Hartley; Max Holden; **Aiden Markram**; Tom Moores; Tawanda Muyeye; George Scrimshaw; Tim Seifert; Josh Tongue; Paul Walter	Trent Boult; Tom Curran; Richard Gleeson; Callum Parkinson; Ollie Pope; Jason Roy; Sherfane Rutherford; Nathan Sowter; Olly Stone; Ollie Sykes; James Vince	Tom Abell; Nikhil Chaudhary; Caleb Falconer; **Chris Jordan**; Ben McKinney; David Miller; Michael Pepper; Adil Rashid; Thomas Rew; Luke Wood; Daniel Worrall	Abrar Ahmed; Tom Alsop; Ed Barnard; **Zak Crawley**; Benny Howell; Tom Lawes; Dan Lawrence; Liam Patterson-White; Matthew Potts; Ryan Rickelton; Reece Topley	Finn Allen; **Sam Billings**; Danny Briggs; Brad Currie; Aneurin Donald; Lewis Gregory; Matt Henry; Louis Kimber; Ben Mayes; Dan Mousley; Craig Overton; David Payne	Tom Aspinwall; Jafer Chohan; Sam Cook; Jordan Cox; Lockie Ferguson; Ben Kellaway; Tom Kohler-Cadmore; Joe Root; Matthew Short; Asa Tribe
Wildcard Picks
Sean Dickson; Tom Helm	Kiran Carlson; Henry Crocombe	Adam Finch; James Sales	Eddie Jack; Sebastian Morgan	Manny Lumsden; Saif Zaib	Charlie Allison; Matt Revis	Ben Raine; Ben Sanderson	Jordan Clark; Dillon Pennington

==== Replacements ====
- Birmingham Phoenix:
  - Matt Montgomery replaced Ethan Brookes due to injury.
  - Joe Weatherley replaced Jacob Bethell due to injury.
  - Ben Dwarshuis replaced Mustafizur Rahman due to injury.
- London Spirit:
  - Andrew Tye replaced Adam Hose due to injury.
  - Joe Moores replaced Tymal Mills due to injury.
- Manchester Super Giants:
  - Michael Bracewell replaced Aiden Markram due to personal reasons.
- MI London:
  - Josh Philippe replaced Sherfane Rutherford for one match due to prior commitments.
  - Sikandar Raza replaced Rashid Khan for three matches due to international commitments.
- Southern Brave:
  - Moeen Ali replaced Thomas Rew due to injury.
- Sunrisers Leeds:
  - Graham Clark replaced Tom Alsop due to injury.
  - James Fuller replaced Reece Topley due to injury.
- Trent Rockets:
  - Mohammad Amir replaced David Payne due to injury.
  - Calvin Harrison replaced Brad Currie due to injury.
  - Matt Milnes replaced Tom Banton due to injury.

== Standings ==
=== Women ===
Pos	Team	Pld	W	L	T	NR	Pts	NRR	Qualification
1	Trent Rockets (C)	8	7	1	0	0	28	1.391	Advanced to the Final
2	Sunrisers Leeds (R)	8	5	3	0	0	20	1.031	Advanced to the Eliminator
3	Southern Brave	8	5	3	0	0	20	0.107	Advanced to the Eliminator
4	Manchester Super Giants	8	4	3	0	1	18	0.344	Eliminated
5	Welsh Fire	8	4	4	0	0	16	0.133	Eliminated
6	London Spirit	8	2	5	1	0	10	−0.363	Eliminated
7	Birmingham Phoenix	8	2	5	0	1	10	−1.602	Eliminated
8	MI London	8	1	6	1	0	6	−1.165	Eliminated

Source: Cricinfo
(C) Champions; (R) Runners-up

=== Point summary Women ===
Team	Group matches								Play-offs	
Team	1	2	3	4	5	6	7	8	E	F
Birmingham Phoenix	0	2	2	6	6	6	6	10	—	—
London Spirit	0	4	6	6	6	6	10	10	—	—
Manchester Super Giants	4	6	10	10	14	14	18	18	—	—
MI London	0	0	0	2	2	6	6	6	—	—
Southern Brave	4	8	12	16	20	20	20	20	L	—
Sunrisers Leeds	4	4	4	4	8	12	16	20	W	L
Trent Rockets	4	4	8	12	16	20	24	28	→	W
Welsh Fire	0	4	4	4	8	12	12	16	—	—

Win	Loss	Tie	No result	Eliminated

- Note: The total points at the end of each group match are listed.
- Note: Click on the points or results to see the match summary.

=== Men ===
Pos	Team	Pld	W	L	T	NR	Pts	NRR	Qualification
1	Trent Rockets (R)	8	6	2	0	0	24	0.740	Advanced to the Final
2	Manchester Super Giants (C)	8	5	3	0	0	20	0.791	Advanced to the Eliminator
3	Sunrisers Leeds	8	5	3	0	0	20	0.603	Advanced to the Eliminator
4	MI London	8	5	3	0	0	20	0.241	Eliminated
5	Welsh Fire	8	4	4	0	0	16	−0.900	Eliminated
6	Southern Brave	8	3	5	0	0	12	−0.015	Eliminated
7	London Spirit	8	3	5	0	0	12	−0.098	Eliminated
8	Birmingham Phoenix	8	1	7	0	0	4	−1.318	Eliminated

Source: Cricinfo
(C) Champions; (R) Runners-up

=== Point summary Men ===
Team	Group matches								Play-offs	
Team	1	2	3	4	5	6	7	8	E	F
Birmingham Phoenix	4	4	4	4	4	4	4	4	—	—
London Spirit	0	0	4	4	4	4	8	12	—	—
Manchester Super Giants	4	8	8	8	8	12	16	20	W	W
MI London	4	4	8	8	12	16	16	20	—	—
Southern Brave	0	0	0	4	8	8	8	12	—	—
Sunrisers Leeds	0	4	8	8	12	16	20	20	L	—
Trent Rockets	0	4	8	12	16	20	24	24	→	L
Welsh Fire	4	8	8	12	16	16	16	16	—	—

Win	Loss	Tie	No result	Eliminated

- Note: The total points at the end of each group match are listed.
- Note: Click on the points or results to see the match summary.

=== Combined ===
Pos	Team	Pld	W	L	T	NR	Pts	NRR
1	Trent Rockets	17	14	3	0	0	64	1.081
2	Sunrisers Leeds	19	11	8	0	0	44	0.778
3	Manchester Super Giants	17	10	6	0	1	42	0.636
4	Southern Brave	17	8	9	0	0	32	−0.003
5	Welsh Fire	16	8	8	0	0	32	−0.377
6	MI London	16	6	9	1	0	26	−0.488
7	London Spirit	16	5	10	1	0	22	−0.261
8	Birmingham Phoenix	16	3	12	0	1	14	−1.482

Updated to match(es) played on 16 August 2026. Source: The Hundred

The Hundred Helix

== Fixtures ==
On 27 January 2026, fixtures were announced by England and Wales Cricket Board (ECB).

=== Women ===
Match 1
21 July 2026
14:45
Scorecard

MI London; 107/8 (100 balls)	v	Sunrisers Leeds; 109/3 (69 balls)
Hayley Matthews 33 (22); Hannah Baker 2/16 (15 balls)		Phoebe Litchfield 43 (26); Alexa Stonehouse 1/12 (10 balls)

Sunrisers Leeds won by 7 wickets
The Oval, London
Umpires: Mark Newell and Sue Redfern
Player of the match: Phoebe Litchfield (Sunrisers Leeds)

- Sunrisers Leeds won the toss and elected to field.

Match 2
22 July 2026
15:00
Scorecard

Southern Brave; 126/7 (100 balls)	v	Welsh Fire; 118/8 (100 balls)
Laura Wolvaardt 45* (36); Heather Graham 4/19 (20 balls)		Georgia Voll 52 (39); Sophie Molineux 3/14 (20 balls)

Southern Brave won by 8 runs
Rose Bowl, Southampton
Umpires: Gabi Brown and Chris Watts
Player of the match: Sophie Molineux (Southern Brave)

- Welsh Fire won the toss and elected to field.

Match 3
23 July 2026
15:00
Scorecard

London Spirit; 80 (91 balls)	v	Manchester Super Giants; 86/3 (59 balls)
Marizanne Kapp 17 (12); Ryana MacDonald-Gay 4/17 (16 balls)		Paige Scholfield 22 (15); Marizanne Kapp 2/18 (20 balls)

Manchester Super Giants won by 7 wickets
Lord's, London
Umpires: Rose Fernando and Surendiran Shanmugam
Player of the match: Ryana MacDonald-Gay (Manchester Super Giants)

- Manchester Super Giants won the toss and elected to field.

Match 4
24 July 2026
15:00
Scorecard

Birmingham Phoenix; 64 (95 balls)	v	Trent Rockets; 68/1 (31 balls)
Ellyse Perry 39 (33); Samantha Bates 3/10 (20 balls)		Sophia Dunkley 43* (17); Lauren Filer 1/17 (6 balls)

Trent Rockets won by 9 wickets
Edgbaston, Birmingham
Umpires: Rose Fernando and Neil Pratt
Player of the match: Samantha Bates (Trent Rockets)

- Trent Rockets won the toss and elected to field.

Match 5
25 July 2026
11:00
Scorecard

Sunrisers Leeds; 116 (100 balls)	v	Southern Brave; 117/5 (96 balls)
Bryony Smith 48 (34); Issy Wong 3/15 (20 balls)		Jemimah Rodrigues 42* (34); Cassidy McCarthy 2/14 (20 balls)

Southern Brave won by 5 wickets
Headingley, Leeds
Umpires: Hassan Adnan and Gabi Brown
Player of the match: Jemimah Rodrigues (Southern Brave)

- Southern Brave won the toss and elected to field.

Match 6
25 July 2026
14:30
Scorecard

Welsh Fire; 177/4 (100 balls)	v	MI London; 117 (92 balls)
Sophie Devine 52 (29); Hayley Matthews 2/52 (20 balls)		Chinelle Henry 30 (23); Grace Potts 3/24 (20 balls)

Welsh Fire won by 60 runs
Sophia Gardens, Cardiff
Umpires: Julia Jarvis and Sue Redfern
Player of the match: Georgia Wareham (Welsh Fire)

- MI London won the toss and elected to field.

Match 7
26 July 2026
11:00
Scorecard

Manchester Super Giants	v	Birmingham Phoenix

Match abandoned
Old Trafford, Manchester
Umpires: Rose Fernando and Neil Pratt

- No toss.
- No play was possible due to rain.

Match 8
26 July 2026
14:30
Scorecard

Trent Rockets; 142/6 (100 balls)	v	London Spirit; 146/5 (97 balls)
Ashleigh Gardner 34 (22); Marizanne Kapp 3/12 (20 balls)		Marie Kelly 41 (28); Ashleigh Gardner 2/24 (20 balls)

London Spirit won by 5 wickets
Trent Bridge, Nottingham
Umpires: Anna Harris and Chris Watts
Player of the match: Nadine de Klerk (London Spirit)

- London Spirit won the toss and elected to field.

Match 9
27 July 2026
15:00
Scorecard

Southern Brave; 126/7 (100 balls)	v	MI London; 125/3 (100 balls)
Laura Wolvaardt 35 (30); Hayley Matthews 4/22 (20 balls)		Danni Wyatt-Hodge 52* (42); Issy Wong 1/20 (20 balls)

Southern Brave won by 1 run
Rose Bowl, Southampton
Umpires: Mark Newell and Surendiran Shanmugam
Player of the match: Jemimah Rodrigues (Southern Brave)

- MI London won the toss and elected to field.

Match 10
28 July 2026
15:00
Scorecard

Sunrisers Leeds; 142/4 (100 balls)	v	Manchester Super Giants; 147/6 (96 balls)
Annabel Sutherland 35 (24); Maitlan Brown 1/27 (20 balls)		Smriti Mandhana 88* (50); Jess Jonassen 1/34 (20 balls)

Manchester Super Giants won by 4 wickets
Headingley, Leeds
Umpires: Naeem Ashraf and Gabi Brown
Player of the match: Smriti Mandhana (Manchester Super Giants)

- Manchester Super Giants won the toss and elected to field.

Match 11
29 July 2026
11:30
Scorecard

Welsh Fire; 129/3 (100 balls)	v	Trent Rockets; 132/2 (83 balls)
Sophie Devine 38 (25); Charley Phillips 2/17 (20 balls)		Beth Mooney 57 (35); Em Arlott 1/15 (10 balls)

Trent Rockets won by 8 wickets
Sophia Gardens, Cardiff
Umpires: Julia Jarvis and Simon Widdup
Player of the match: Beth Mooney (Trent Rockets)

- Trent Rockets won the toss and elected to field.

Match 12
29 July 2026
15:00
Scorecard

MI London; 151/4 (100 balls)	v	London Spirit; 151/5 (100 balls)
Amelia Kerr 49* (32); Marizanne Kapp 2/24 (20 balls)		Amy Jones 49 (36); Kirstie Gordon 2/29 (20 balls)

Match tied
The Oval, London
Umpires: Mark Newell and James Tredwell
Player of the match: Marie Kelly (London Spirit)

- London Spirit won the toss and elected to field.

Match 13
30 July 2026
15:00
Scorecard

Southern Brave; 140/3 (100 balls)	v	Birmingham Phoenix; 116/5 (100 balls)
Maia Bouchier 45 (31); Lauren Filer 1/22 (15 balls)		Davina Perrin 52 (43); Sophie Molineux 2/24 (20 balls)

Southern Brave won by 24 runs
Rose Bowl, Southampton
Umpires: Siphelele Gasa (SA) and Sue Redfern (Eng)
Player of the match: Lizelle Lee (Southern Brave)

- Birmingham Phoenix won the toss and elected to field.

Match 14
31 July 2026
15:00
Scorecard

Trent Rockets; 153/8 (100 balls)	v	Manchester Super Giants; 122/10 (93 balls)
Sophia Dunkley 57 (33); Sophie Ecclestone 2/24 (20 balls)		Meg Lanning 35 (24); Ashleigh Gardner 4/16 (18 balls)

Trent Rockets won by 31 runs
Old Trafford, Manchester
Umpires: Ben Peverall and Neil Pratt
Player of the match: Sophia Dunkley (Trent Rockets)

- Manchester Super Giants won the toss and elected to field.

Match 15
1 August 2026
11:00
Scorecard

Welsh Fire; 144/3 (100 balls)	v	Birmingham Phoenix; 145/3 (99 balls)
Georgia Voll 78 (55); Alice Capsey 2/24 (15 balls)		Ellyse Perry 68* (46); Georgia Voll 1/9 (10 balls)

Birmingham Phoenix won by 7 wickets
Edgbaston, Birmingham
Umpires: Anthony Harris and Gabi Brown
Player of the match: Ellyse Perry (Birmingham Phoenix)

- Birmingham Phoenix won the toss and elected to field.

Match 16
1 August 2026
14:30
Scorecard

London Spirit; 114/8 (100 balls)	v	Southern Brave; 115/5 (93 balls)
Nadine de Klerk 38 (28); Sophie Molineux 3/7 (20 balls)		Maia Bouchier 46 (38); Nadine de Klerk 2/13 (18 balls)

Southern Brave won by 5 wickets
Lord's, London
Umpires: Grace Bambury and James Tredwell
Player of the match: Sophie Molineux (Southern Brave)

- Southern Brave won the toss and elected to field.

Match 17
2 August 2026
11:00
Scorecard

Trent Rockets; 139/7 (100 balls)	v	Sunrisers Leeds; 134/5 (100 balls)
Sophia Dunkley 56 (33); Jess Jonassen 2/20 (20 balls)		Annabel Sutherland 59* (30); Georgia Adams 1/17 (15 balls)

Trent Rockets won by 5 runs
Trent Bridge, Nottingham
Umpires: Ben Peverall and Sue Redfern
Player of the match: Sophia Dunkley (Trent Rockets)

- Sunrisers Leeds won the toss and elected to field.

Match 18
2 August 2026
14:30
Scorecard

MI London; 92/10 (99 balls)	v	Manchester Super Giants; 95/4 (72 balls)
Kira Chathli 18 (16); Ryana MacDonald-Gay 3/19 (19 balls)		Meg Lanning 43 (31); Amelia Kerr 2/21 (20 balls)

Manchester Super Giants won by 6 wickets
The Oval, London
Umpires: Hassan Adnan and Anna Harris
Player of the match: Sophie Ecclestone (Manchester Super Giants)

- Manchester Super Giants won the toss and elected to field.

Match 19
3 August 2026
15:00
Scorecard

Southern Brave; 121/5 (100 balls)	v	Welsh Fire; 122/6 (100 balls)
Laura Wolvaardt 48 (45); Grace Potts 2/14 (20 balls)		Heather Graham 35* (28); Tilly Corteen-Coleman 3/27 (20 balls)

Welsh Fire won by 4 wickets
Sophia Gardens, Cardiff
Umpires: Chris Watts and Grace Bambury
Player of the match: Heather Graham (Welsh Fire)

- Southern Brave won the toss and elected to bat.

Match 20
4 August 2026
15:00
Scorecard

London Spirit; 136/7 (100 balls)	v	Sunrisers Leeds; 142/5 (98 balls)
Grace Harris 51 (27); Deepti Sharma 2/18 (20 balls)		Annabel Sutherland 37* (21); Katie George 3/25 (20 balls)

Sunrisers Leeds won by 5 wickets
Headingley, Leeds
Umpires: Mark Newall and Simon Widdup
Player of the match: Annabel Sutherland (Sunrisers Leeds)

- Sunrisers Leeds won the toss and elected to field.

Match 21
5 August 2026
11:30
Scorecard

Manchester Super Giants; 85/9 (100 balls)	v	Welsh Fire; 88/7 (91 balls)
Ryana MacDonald-Gay 18* (14); Orla Prendergast 4/18 (20 balls)		Georgia Wareham 17 (12); Sophie Ecclestone 3/14 (20 balls)

Welsh Fire won by 3 wicket
Old Trafford, Manchester
Umpires: Anthony Harris and Neil Pratt
Player of the match: Orla Prendergast (Welsh Fire)

- Welsh Fire won the toss and elected to field.

Match 22
5 August 2026
15:00
Scorecard

Birmingham Phoenix; 122/7 (100 balls)	v	Trent Rockets; 124/4 (84 balls)
Emma Lamb 45 (34); Kim Garth 4/23 (20 balls)		Sophia Dunkley 65 (37); Alice Capsey 1/16 (10 balls)

Trent Rockets won by 6 wickets
Trent Bridge, Nottingham
Umpires: Hassan Adnan and Surendiran Shanmugam
Player of the match: Sophia Dunkley (Trent Rockets)

- Trent Rockets won the toss and elected to field.

Match 23
6 August 2026
15:00
Scorecard

MI London; 122/9 (100 balls)	v	London Spirit; 119/8 (100 balls)
Amelia Kerr 69* (40); Charlie Dean 3/26 (20 balls)		Nadine de Klerk 35 (29); Hayley Matthews 2/21 (15 balls)

MI London won by 3 runs
Lord's, London
Umpires: Gabi Brown and Ben Peverall
Player of the match: Amelia Kerr (MI London)

- London Spirit won the toss and elected to field

Match 24
7 August 2026
15:00
Scorecard

Birmingham Phoenix; 107/9 (100 balls)	v	Sunrisers Leeds; 111/1 (69 balls)
Emma Lamb 47 (34); Deepti Sharma 3/11 (15 balls)		Phoebe Litchfield 71* (33); Fatima Sana 1/25 (15 balls)

Sunrisers Leeds won by 9 wickets
Edgbaston, Birmingham
Umpires: Hassan Adnan and Anna Harris
Player of the match: Phoebe Litchfield (Sunrisers Leeds)

- Sunrisers Leeds won the toss and elected to field

Match 25
8 August 2026
11:00
Scorecard

MI London; 121/5 (100 balls)	v	Trent Rockets; 125/1 (82 balls)
Kira Chathli 31 (27); Samantha Bates 3/13 (20 balls)		Nat Sciver-Brunt 67* (36); Tara Norris 1/26 (20 balls)

Trent Rockets won by 9 wickets
The Oval, London
Umpires: Anthony Harris and Rose Fernando
Player of the match: Nat Sciver-Brunt (Trent Rockets)

- Trent Rockets won the toss and elected to field.

Match 26
8 August 2026
14:30
Scorecard

Manchester Super Giants; 139/4 (100 balls)	v	Southern Brave; 112/6 (100 balls)
Richa Ghosh 54 (34); Issy Wong 2/24 (20 balls)		Laura Wolvaardt 36 (28); Mady Villiers 3/17 (20 balls)

Manchester Super Giants won by 27 runs
Rose Bowl, Southampton
Umpires: Mark Newell and James Tredwell
Player of the match: Mady Villiers (Manchester Super Giants)

- Manchester Super Giants won the toss and elected to bat.

Match 27
9 August 2026
11:00
Scorecard

Welsh Fire; 121/8 (100 balls)	v	Sunrisers Leeds; 122/4 (74 balls)
Freya Kemp 72* (45); Deepti Sharma 3/13 (20 balls)		Phoebe Litchfield 55 (25); Sophia Smale 2/23 (20 balls)

Sunrisers Leeds won by 6 wickets
Headingley, Leeds
Umpires: Paul Baldwin and Surendiran Shanmugam
Player of the match: Phoebe Litchfield (Sunrisers Leeds)

- Sunrisers Leeds won the toss and elected to field.

Match 28
9 August 2026
14:30
Scorecard

London Spirit; 140/4 (100 balls)	v	Birmingham Phoenix; 108/8 (100 balls)
Marizanne Kapp 57* (28); Alana King 2/18 (20 balls)		Emma Lamb 36 (26); Charlie Dean 3/17 (20 balls)

London Spirit won by 32 runs
Lord's, London
Umpires: Grace Bambury and Mark Newall
Player of the match: Marizanne Kapp (London Spirit)

- Birmingham Phoenix won the toss and elected to field.

Match 29
10 August 2026
15:00
Scorecard

Southern Brave; 117/5 (100 balls)	v	Trent Rockets; 118/7 (98 balls)
Maia Bouchier 38 (33); Georgia Adams 2/14 (20 balls)		Ashleigh Gardner 37 (25); Tilly Corteen-Coleman 2/16 (20 balls)

Trent Rockets won by 3 wickets
Trent Bridge, Nottingham
Umpires: Paul Baldwin and Neil Pratt
Player of the match: Nat Sciver-Brunt (Trent Rockets)

- Trent Rockets won the toss and elected to field.

Match 30
11 August 2026
15:00
Scorecard

Sunrisers Leeds; 166/4 (100 balls)	v	Manchester Super Giants; 125/8 (100 balls)
Annabel Sutherland 62* (36); Mady Villiers 2/25 (15 balls)		Grace Scrivens 31 (24); Jess Jonassen 3/21 (20 balls)

Sunrisers Leeds won by 41 runs
Old Trafford, Manchester
Umpires: Naeem Ashraf and Simon Widdup
Player of the match: Annabel Sutherland (Sunrisers Leeds)

- Manchester Super Giants won the toss and elected to field.

Match 31
12 August 2026
11:30
Scorecard

Welsh Fire; 138/7 (100 balls)	v	London Spirit; 123 (99 balls)
Georgia Wareham 50 (34); Grace Harris 3/15 (15 balls)		Charlie Dean 27 (20); Grace Potts 3/23 (20 balls)

Welsh Fire won by 15 runs
Sophia Gardens, Cardiff
Umpires: Julia Jarvis and Chris Watts
Player of the match: Grace Potts (Welsh Fire)

- London Spirit won the toss and elected to field.

Match 32
12 August 2026
15:00
Scorecard

MI London; 120/6 (100 balls)	v	Birmingham Phoenix; 121/5 (94 balls)
Chinelle Henry 42 (33); Eva Gray 2/29 (20 balls)		Ellyse Perry 62* (39); Kirstie Gordon 2/20 (20 balls)

Birmingham Phoenix won by 5 wickets
Edgbaston, Birmingham
Umpires: Rose Fernando and Surendiran Shanmugam
Player of the match: Ellyse Perry (Birmingham Phoenix)

- Birmingham Phoenix won the toss and elected to field.

=== Men ===
Match 1
21 July 2026
18:30 (D/N)
Scorecard

Sunrisers Leeds; 143 (99 balls)	v	MI London; 144/3 (84 balls)
Mitchell Marsh 41 (27); Richard Gleeson 4/25 (19 balls)		Sam Curran 60* (39); Brydon Carse 2/18 (20 balls)

MI London won by 7 wickets
The Oval, London
Umpires: Martin Saggers and Rob White
Player of the match: Nicholas Pooran (MI London)

- MI London won the toss and elected to field.

Match 2
22 July 2026
18:30 (D/N)
Scorecard

Southern Brave; 135/7 (100 balls)	v	Welsh Fire; 138/4 (98 balls)
David Miller 44 (35); Marco Jansen 2/17 (20 balls)		Phil Salt 47* (37); Nikhil Chaudhary 2/19 (15 balls)

Welsh Fire won by 6 wickets
Rose Bowl, Southampton
Umpires: James Middlebrook and Jack Shantry
Player of the match: Phil Salt (Welsh Fire)

- Welsh Fire won the toss and elected to field.

Match 3
23 July 2026
18:30 (D/N)
Scorecard

Manchester Super Giants; 138/9 (100 balls)	v	London Spirit; 131/6 (100 balls)
Tim Seifert 67 (45); Liam Livingstone 2/27 (15 balls)		Liam Livingstone 69 (40); Gus Atkinson 2/15 (20 balls)

Manchester Super Giants won by 7 runs
Lord's, London
Umpires: Ben Debenham and Nigel Llong
Player of the match: Liam Livingstone (London Spirit)

- London Spirit won the toss and elected to field.

Match 4
24 July 2026
18:30 (D/N)
Scorecard

Birmingham Phoenix; 214/4 (100 balls)	v	Trent Rockets; 204/7 (100 balls)
Joe Clarke 68 (33); Calvin Harrison 2/27 (20 balls)		Tom Banton 67 (32); Usman Tariq 2/36 (20 balls)

Birmingham Phoenix won by 10 runs
Edgbaston, Birmingham
Umpires: Tom Lungley and Paul Pollard
Player of the match: Joe Clarke (Birmingham Phoenix)

- Trent Rockets won the toss and elected to field.

Match 5
25 July 2026
14:30
Scorecard

Sunrisers Leeds; 187/5 (100 balls)	v	Southern Brave; 182/5 (100 balls)
Mitchell Marsh 69 (34); Adil Rashid 3/21 (20 balls)		Ben McKinney 44 (23); Abrar Ahmed 2/23 (20 balls)

Sunrisers Leeds won by 5 runs
Headingley, Leeds
Umpires: Steve O'Shaughnessy and Jack Shantry
Player of the match: Mitchell Marsh (Sunrisers Leeds)

- Southern Brave won the toss and elected to field.

Match 6
25 July 2026
18:00 (D/N)
Scorecard

Welsh Fire; 167/5 (100 balls)	v	MI London; 152/6 (100 balls)
Rachin Ravindra 98 (44); Trent Boult 1/16 (20 balls)		James Vince 66 (38); Lockie Ferguson 4/27 (20 balls)

Welsh Fire won by 15 runs
Sophia Gardens, Cardiff
Umpires: Mike Burns and Ben Debenham
Player of the match: Rachin Ravindra (Welsh Fire)

- MI London won the toss and elected to field.

Match 7
26 July 2026
14:30
Scorecard

Manchester Super Giants; 187/5 (100 balls)	v	Birmingham Phoenix; 100 (97 balls)
Jos Buttler 90 (50); Rehan Ahmed 2/43 (20 balls)		Donovan Ferreira 23 (25); Liam Dawson 3/15 (17 balls)

Manchester Super Giants won by 87 runs
Old Trafford, Manchester
Umpires: James Middlebrook and Steve O'Shaughnessy
Player of the match: Jos Buttler (Manchester Super Giants)

- Birmingham Phoenix won the toss and elected to field.

Match 8
26 July 2026
18:00 (D/N)
Scorecard

London Spirit; 159/9 (100 balls)	v	Trent Rockets; 160/6 (98 balls)
Dewald Brevis 39 (24); Calvin Harrison 2/25 (20 balls)		Ben Duckett 75 (47); Adam Milne 2/25 (20 balls)

Trent Rockets won by 4 wickets
Trent Bridge, Nottingham
Umpires: Paul Pollard and Rob White
Player of the match: Ben Duckett (Trent Rockets)

- Trent Rockets won the toss and elected to field.

Match 9
27 July 2026
18:30 (D/N)
Scorecard

Southern Brave; 129/9 (100 balls)	v	MI London; 130/7 (100 balls)
Jamie Smith 49 (26); Trent Boult 2/15 (20 balls)		Will Jacks 54 (41); Marcus Stoinis 3/17 (20 balls)

MI London won by 3 wickets
Rose Bowl, Southampton
Umpires: Ian Blackwell and Martin Saggers
Player of the match: Will Jacks (MI London)

- MI London won the toss and elected to field.

Match 10
28 July 2026
18:30 (D/N)
Scorecard

Manchester Super Giants; 181/3 (100 balls)	v	Sunrisers Leeds; 186/2 (88 balls)
Jos Buttler 63* (33); Nathan Ellis 2/32 (20 balls)		Mitchell Marsh 63 (26); Sonny Baker 1/30 (20 balls)

Sunrisers Leeds won by 8 wickets
Headingley, Leeds
Umpires: James Middlebrook and David Millns
Player of the match: Mitchell Marsh (Sunrisers Leeds)

- Sunrisers Leeds won the toss and elected to field.

Match 11
29 July 2026
15:00
Scorecard

Welsh Fire; 122/7 (100 balls)	v	Trent Rockets; 126/1 (72 balls)
Matthew Short 36 (26); Mitchell Santner 3/35 (20 balls)		Ben Duckett 52* (45); Rachin Ravindra 1/4 (5 balls)

Trent Rockets won by 9 wickets
Sophia Gardens, Cardiff
Umpires: Ian Blackwell and Martin Saggers
Player of the match: Ben Duckett (Trent Rockets)

- Trent Rockets won the toss and elected to field.

Match 12
29 July 2026
18:30 (D/N)
Scorecard

MI London; 164/5 (100 balls)	v	London Spirit; 165/3 (89 balls)
Will Jacks 65 (44); Jamie Overton 3/30 (20 balls)		Lhuan-dre Pretorius 64 (28); Richard Gleeson 1/23 (15 balls)

London Spirit won by 7 wickets
The Oval, London
Umpires: Ben Debenham and Paul Pollard
Player of the match: Lhuan-dre Pretorius (London Spirit)

- London Spirit won the toss and elected to field.

Match 13
30 July 2026
18:30 (D/N)
Scorecard

Southern Brave; 128/8 (100 balls)	v	Birmingham Phoenix; 116/9 (100 balls)
Marcus Stoinis 34 (26); Rehan Ahmed 3/25 (20 balls)		Will Smeed 35 (28); Luke Wood 3/24 (20 balls)

Southern Brave won by 12 runs
Rose Bowl, Southampton
Umpires: Nigel Llong and Martin Saggers
Player of the match: Marcus Stoinis (Southern Brave)

- Birmingham Phoenix won the toss and elected to field.

Match 14
31 July 2026
18:30 (D/N)
Scorecard

Manchester Super Giants; 137/3 (100 balls)	v	Trent Rockets; 140/4 (87 balls)
Jos Buttler 55* (37); Craig Overton 3/23 (20 balls)		Finn Allen 72* (35); Gus Atkinson 2/27 (20 balls)

Trent Rockets won by 6 wickets
Old Trafford, Manchester
Umpires: David Millns and Steve O'Shaughnessy
Player of the match: Finn Allen (Trent Rockets)

- Trent Rockets won the toss and elected to field.

Match 15
1 August 2026
14:30
Scorecard

Birmingham Phoenix; 137/9 (100 balls)	v	Welsh Fire; 138/3 (96 balls)
Joe Clarke 35 (23); Lockie Ferguson 2/20 (20 balls)		Joe Root 58* (40); Chris Wood 1/21 (20 balls)

Welsh Fire won by 7 wickets
Edgbaston, Birmingham
Umpires: Graham Lloyd and Jack Shantry
Player of the match: Joe Root (Welsh Fire)

- Birmingham Phoenix won the toss and elected to bat.

Match 16
1 August 2026
18:00 (D/N)
Scorecard

London Spirit; 105/10 (92 balls)	v	Southern Brave; 111/5 (97 balls)
Jonny Bairstow 56 (43); Jofra Archer 4/9 (20 balls)		David Miller 39* (28); David Willey 2/28 (15 balls)

Southern Brave won by 5 wickets
Lord's, London
Umpires: Ian Blackwell and Siphelele Gasa
Player of the match: Jofra Archer (Southern Brave)

- Southern Brave won the toss and elected to field.

Match 17
2 August 2026
14:30
Scorecard

Trent Rockets; 146/4 (100 balls)	v	Sunrisers Leeds; 141/4 (100 balls)
Ben Duckett 64 (47); Brydon Carse 2/20 (20 balls)		Harry Brook 46 (33); Mohammad Amir 2/20 (20 balls)

Trent Rockets won by 5 runs
Trent Bridge, Nottingham
Umpires: Ben Debenham and Michael Gough
Player of the match: Ben Duckett (Trent Rockets)

- Trent Rockets won the toss and elected to bat.

Match 18
2 August 2026
18:00 (D/N)
Scorecard

MI London; 183/6 (100 balls)	v	Manchester Super Giants; 138/10 (95 balls)
Will Jacks 62 (31); Josh Tongue 2/13 (20 balls)		Aiden Markram 50 (26); Rashid Khan 5/17 (20 balls)

MI London won by 45 runs
The Oval, London
Umpires: Siphelele Gasa (SA) and Russell Warren (Eng)
Player of the match: Rashid Khan (MI London)

- Manchester Super Giants won the toss and elected to field.

Match 19
3 August 2026
18:30 (D/N)
Scorecard

Southern Brave; 115/8 (100 balls)	v	Welsh Fire; 116/4 (95 balls)
Marcus Stoinis 55 (39); Sam Cook 3/14 (20 balls)		Matthew Short 60* (41); Jofra Archer 2/19 (20 balls)

Welsh Fire won by 6 wickets
Sophia Gardens, Cardiff
Umpires: Rob White and Tom Lungley
Player of the match: Matthew Short (Welsh Fire)

- Welsh Fire won the toss and elected to field.

Match 20
4 August 2026
18:30 (D/N)
Scorecard

Sunrisers Leeds; 241/2 (100 balls)	v	London Spirit; 204/6 (100 balls)
Ryan Rickelton 94* (42); Adam Milne 1/37 (20 balls)		David Willey 83* (46); Nathan Ellis 2/42 (20 balls)

Sunrisers Leeds won by 37 runs
Headingley, Leeds
Umpires: Michael Gough and Paul Pollard
Player of the match: Ryan Rickelton (Sunrisers Leeds)

- London Spirit won the toss and elected to field.

Match 21
5 August 2026
15:00
Scorecard

Welsh Fire; 155/4 (100 balls)	v	Manchester Super Giants; 161/1 (69 balls)
Matthew Short 71 (47); Gus Atkinson 2/12 (15 balls)		Tim Seifert 62* (36); Sam Cook 1/20 (10 balls)

Manchester Super Giants won by 9 wickets
Old Trafford, Manchester
Umpires: Ian Blackwell and Michael Gough
Player of the match: Tim Seifert (Manchester Super Giants)

- Welsh Fire won the toss and elected to bat.

Match 22
5 August 2026
18:30 (D/N)
Scorecard

Birmingham Phoenix; 111/6 (100 balls)	v	Trent Rockets; 116/3 (83 balls)
Joe Clarke 62 (45); Lewis Gregory 2/20 (20 balls)		Sam Billings 31* (19); Usman Tariq 2/15 (20 balls)

Trent Rockets won by 7 wickets
Trent Bridge, Nottingham
Umpires: David Millns and Graham Lloyd
Player of the match: Lewis Gregory (Trent Rockets)

- Trent Rockets won the toss and elected to field.

Match 23
6 August 2026
18:30 (D/N)
Scorecard

London Spirit; 160/5 (100 balls)	v	MI London; 164/6 (94 balls)
Lhuan-dre Pretorius 52 (28); Nathan Sowter 2/29 (20 balls)		Nicholas Pooran 39 (25); Jamie Overton 2/23 (15 balls)

MI London won by 4 wickets
Lord's, London
Umpires: Mike Burns and Nigel Llong
Player of the match: Sikandar Raza (MI London)

- MI London won the toss and elected to field.

Match 24
7 August 2026
18:30 (D/N)
Scorecard

Sunrisers Leeds; 169/7 (100 balls)	v	Birmingham Phoenix; 124/8 (100 balls)
Ryan Rickelton 65 (37); Usman Tariq 2/28 (20 balls)		Sean Dickson 34 (27); Brydon Carse 3/17 (20 balls)

Sunrisers Leeds won by 45 runs
Edgbaston, Birmingham
Umpires: Graham Lloyd and Tom Lungley
Player of the match: Ryan Rickelton (Sunrisers Leeds)

- Birmingham Phoenix won the toss and elected to field.

Match 25
8 August 2026
14:30
Scorecard

MI London; 147/7 (100 balls)	v	Trent Rockets; 148/4 (90 balls)
Sam Curran 72 (46); Lewis Gregory 2/32 (15 balls)		Mitchell Santner 52* (23); Richard Gleeson 2/27 (20 balls)

Trent Rockets won by 6 wickets
The Oval, London
Umpires: David Millns and Russell Warren
Player of the match: Mitchell Santner (Trent Rockets)

- Trent Rockets won the toss and elected to field.

Match 26
8 August 2026
18:00 (D/N)
Scorecard

Manchester Super Giants; 149/8 (100 balls)	v	Southern Brave; 139/6 (100 balls)
Paul Walter 64 (32); Adil Rashid 2/17 (20 balls)		Tristan Stubbs 53 (38); Gus Atkinson 2/19 (20 balls)

Manchester Super Giants won by 10 runs
Rose Bowl, Southampton
Umpires: Mike Burns and Steve O'Shaughnessy
Player of the match: Paul Walter (Manchester Super Giants)

- Manchester Super Giants won the toss and elected to bat.

Match 27
9 August 2026
14:30
Scorecard

Sunrisers Leeds; 201/4 (100 balls)	v	Welsh Fire; 130/6 (100 balls)
Mitchell Marsh 50 (34); Chris Woakes 2/41 (20 balls)		Matthew Short 43 (29); Brydon Carse 3/24 (20 balls)

Sunrisers Leeds won by 71 runs
Headingley, Leeds
Umpires: Paul Pollard and Tom Lungley
Player of the match: Mitchell Marsh (Sunrisers Leeds)

- Welsh Fire won the toss and elected to field.

Match 28
9 August 2026
18:00 (D/N)
Scorecard

Birmingham Phoenix; 162/4 (100 balls)	v	London Spirit; 166/3 (82 balls)
Joe Clarke 73 (42); James Coles 1/25 (20 balls)		Liam Livingstone 66 (30); Jordan Thompson 1/24 (10 balls)

London Spirit won by 7 wickets
Lord's, London
Umpires: Michael Gough and Russell Warren
Player of the match: Liam Livingstone (London Spirit)

- London Sprit won the toss and elected to field.

Match 29
10 August 2026
18:30 (D/N)
Scorecard

Trent Rockets; 158/5 (100 balls)	v	Southern Brave; 159/4 (97 balls)
Mitchell Santner 35* (23); Daniel Worrall 1/21 (20 balls)		Tristan Stubbs 52* (28); Calvin Harrison 2/32 (10 balls)

Southern Brave won by 6 wickets
Trent Bridge, Nottingham
Umpires: Graham Lloyd and Jack Shantry
Player of the match: Tristan Stubbs (Southern Brave)

- Southern Brave won the toss and elected to field.

Match 30
11 August 2026
18:30 (D/N)
Scorecard

Sunrisers Leeds; 127 (100 balls)	v	Manchester Super Giants; 128/0 (67 balls)
Mitchell Marsh 32 (23); Gus Atkinson 3/30 (20 balls)		Tim Seifert 80* (40)

Manchester Super Giants won by 10 wickets
Old Trafford, Manchester
Umpires: Mike Burns and Russell Warren
Player of the match: Tim Seifert (Manchester Super Giants)

- Manchester Super Giants won the toss and elected to field.

Match 31
12 August 2026
15:00
Scorecard

London Spirit; 131/8 (100 balls)	v	Welsh Fire; 125/7 (100 balls)
Jonny Bairstow 34 (19); Marco Jansen 2/16 (20 balls)		Jordan Cox 44 (28); David Willey 3/20 (20 balls)

London Spirit won by 6 runs
Sophia Gardens, Cardiff
Umpires: James Middlebrook and Rob White
Player of the match: David Willey (London Spirit)

- Welsh Fire won the toss and elected to field.

Match 32
12 August 2026
18:30 (D/N)
Scorecard

MI London; 157/6 (100 balls)	v	Birmingham Phoenix; 155/7 (100 balls)
Nicholas Pooran 36 (21); Rehan Ahmed 2/7 (15 balls)		Joe Weatherley 42 (31); Richard Gleeson 2/29 (20 balls)

MI London won by 2 runs
Edgbaston, Birmingham
Umpires: Ben Debenham and Nigel Llong
Player of the match: Richard Gleeson (MI London)

- Birmingham Phoenix won the toss and elected to field.

== Knockout stages ==
Womens Final at Lords

=== Women ===
Eliminator			Final
			1	Trent Rockets	92/2 (54 balls)
2	Sunrisers Leeds	116/5 (89 balls)	EW	Sunrisers Leeds	91 (91 balls)
3	Southern Brave	114/7 (100 balls)

==== Eliminator ====
Eliminator
14 August 2026
14:15
Scorecard

Southern Brave; 114/7 (100 balls)	v	Sunrisers Leeds; 116/5 (89 balls)
Lizelle Lee 32 (25); Hannah Baker 2/13 (20 balls)		Lauren Winfield-Hill 37 (37); Issy Wong 3/21 (20 balls)

Sunrisers Leeds won by 5 wickets
The Oval, London
Umpires: Gabi Brown and Neil Pratt
Player of the match: Hannah Baker (Sunrisers Leeds)

- Sunrisers Leeds won the toss and elected to field.

==== Final ====
Final
16 August 2026
14:15
Scorecard

Sunrisers Leeds; 91 (91 balls)	v	Trent Rockets; 92/2 (54 balls)
Annabel Sutherland 25 (23); Georgia Adams 2/9 (15 balls)		Sophia Dunkley 41 (23); Dani Gibson 1/9 (5 balls)

Trent Rockets won by 8 wickets
Lord's, London
Umpires: Anna Harris and Surendiran Shanmugam
Player of the match: Georgia Adams (Trent Rockets)

- Trent Rockets won the toss and elected to field.

=== Men ===
Eliminator			Final
			1	Trent Rockets	158/8 (100 balls)
2	Manchester Super Giants	186/4 (100 balls)	EW	Manchester Super Giants	162/5 (98 balls)
3	Sunrisers Leeds	166/7 (100 balls)

==== Eliminator ====
Eliminator
14 August 2026
18:00 (D/N)
Scorecard

Manchester Super Giants; 186/4 (100 balls)	v	Sunrisers Leeds; 166/7 (100 balls)
Paul Walter 80 (46); Brydon Carse 1/22 (20 balls)		Ryan Rickelton 54* (34); Josh Tongue 4/26 (20 balls)

Manchester Super Giants won by 20 runs
The Oval, London
Umpires: Ian Blackwell and Paul Pollard
Player of the match: Josh Tongue (Manchester Super Giants)

- Sunrisers Leeds won the toss and elected to field.

==== Final ====
The men's final at Lord's.

Final
16 August 2026
18:00 (D/N)
Scorecard

Trent Rockets; 158/8 (100 balls)	v	Manchester Super Giants; 162/5 (98 balls)
Aneurin Donald 38 (19); Noor Ahmad 3/33 (20 balls)		Tim Seifert 72 (38); Mohammad Amir 3/29 (20 balls)

Manchester Super Giants won by 5 wickets
Lord's, London
Umpires: Graham Lloyd and Michael Gough
Player of the match: Tim Seifert (Manchester Super Giants)

- Manchester Super Giants won the toss and elected to field.

== Statistics ==
=== Most runs ===
Women
Runs	Player	Team	HS
315	Annabel Sutherland	Sunrisers Leeds	62*
303	Phoebe Litchfield	Sunrisers Leeds	71*
301	Sophia Dunkley	Trent Rockets	65
250	Georgia Voll	Welsh Fire	78
232	Smriti Mandhana	Manchester Super Giants	88*

- Source: Cricinfo

Men
Runs	Player	Team	HS
416	Mitch Marsh	Sunrisers Leeds	76
394	Tim Seifert	Manchester Super Giants	80*
345	Ryan Rickelton	Sunrisers Leeds	94*
337	Ben Duckett	Trent Rockets	75
334	Jos Buttler	Manchester Super Giants	90

- Source: Cricinfo

=== Most wickets ===
Women
Wickets	Player	Team	BBI
13	Samantha Bates	Trent Rockets	3/10
13	Deepti Sharma	Sunrisers Leeds	3/11
13	Tilly Corteen-Coleman	Southern Brave	3/27
12	Charlie Dean	London Spirit	3/17
12	Issy Wong	Southern Brave	3/15

- Source: Cricinfo

Men
Wickets	Player	Team	BBI
14	Josh Tongue	Manchester Super Giants	4/26
14	Richard Gleeson	MI London	4/25
13	Sonny Baker	Manchester Super Giants	2/22
12	Gus Atkinson	Manchester Super Giants	3/30
12	Brydon Carse	Sunrisers Leeds	3/17

- Source: Cricinfo
