= 2026 Trent Rockets season =

Season of the 100-ball cricket tournament

Trent Rockets
2026 season
- Coach: Chris Read (women); Peter Moores (men)
- Captain: Ashleigh Gardner (women); Sam Billings (men)
- Overseas player: Samantha Bates; Ashleigh Gardner; Kim Garth; Beth Mooney; (women); Finn Allen; Tim David; Matt Henry; Mitchell Santner; (men)
- The Hundred (Men's): Runner up
- The Hundred (Women's): Champions

The 2026 season was the Trent Rockets's sixth season of the 100 ball franchise cricket, The Hundred.

== Current squads ==
- **Bold** denotes players with international caps.
- * denotes a player who is unavailable for rest of the season.

=== Women's side ===
No.	Name	Nationality	Date of birth (age)	Batting style	Bowling style	Notes
Batters
6	Sophie Luff	England	6 December 1993 (age 32)	Right-handed	Right-arm medium	Replacement player
47	**Sophia Dunkley**	England	16 July 1998 (age 28)	Right-handed	Right-arm leg break	England central contract
59	**Georgia Elwiss**	England	31 May 1991 (age 35)	Right-handed	Right-arm medium	
—	Eve Jones	England	8 August 1992 (age 34)	Left-handed	Left-arm medium	Wildcard player
—	**Ailsa Lister**	Scotland	8 April 2004 (age 22)	Right-handed	—	Ruled out through injury
All-rounders
1	**Georgia Adams**	England	4 October 1993 (age 32)	Right-handed	Right-arm off break	
34	**Kim Garth**	Australia (Note: Garth has also played international cricket for Ireland.)	25 April 1996 (age 30)	Right-handed	Right-arm medium	Overseas player
39	**Nat Sciver-Brunt**	England	20 August 1992 (age 34)	Right-handed	Right-arm medium	England central contract
63	**Ashleigh Gardner**	Australia	15 April 1997 (age 29)	Right-handed	Right-arm off break	Captain; Overseas player
88	Emma Jones	England	8 August 2002 (age 24)	Right-handed	Right-arm medium	
—	Amu Surenkumar	England	24 October 2006 (age 19)	Right-handed	Right-arm medium	Wildcard player
Wicket-keepers
23	**Beth Mooney**	Australia	14 January 1994 (age 32)	Left-handed	—	Overseas player
25	**Bess Heath**	England	20 August 2001 (age 25)	Right-handed	—	
Pace bowlers
19	Charley Phillips	England	7 May 2003 (age 23)	Right-handed	Right-arm medium	
—	Grace Johnson	England	21 December 2004 (age 21)	Right-handed	Right-arm medium	Ruled out through injury
—	Sophie Munro	England	31 August 2001 (age 25)	Right-handed	Right-arm medium	Replacement player
Spin bowlers
4	Katie Levick	England	18 July 1991 (age 35)	Right-handed	Right-arm leg break	
50	Samantha Bates	Australia	17 August 1992 (age 34)	Right-handed	Slow left-arm orthodox	Overseas player
—	Millie Taylor	England	7 October 2004 (age 21)	Right-handed	Slow left-arm unorthodox	

=== Men's side ===
No.	Name	Nationality	Date of birth (age)	Batting style	Bowling style	Notes
Batters
8	**Tim David**	Australia (Note: David has also played international cricket for Singapore.)	16 March 1996 (age 30)	Right-handed	Right-arm off break	Overseas player
12	Aneurin Donald	Wales	20 December 1996 (age 29)	Right-handed	Right-arm off break	
16	**Finn Allen**	New Zealand	22 April 1999 (age 27)	Right-handed	Right-arm off break	Overseas player
17	**Ben Duckett**	England	17 October 1994 (age 31)	Left-handed	Right-arm off break	England central contract
—	Louis Kimber	England	24 February 1997 (age 29)	Right-handed	Right-arm off break	
—	Ben Mayes	England	21 November 2007 (age 18)	Right-handed	Right-arm off break	
All-rounders
24	**Lewis Gregory**	England	24 May 1992 (age 34)	Right-handed	Right-arm fast-medium	
74	**Mitchell Santner**	New Zealand	5 February 1992 (age 34)	Left-handed	Slow left-arm orthodox	Overseas player
—	**Dan Mousley**	England	8 July 2001 (age 25)	Right-handed	Right-arm off break	
—	Ben Raine	England	14 September 1991 (age 35)	Right-handed	Right-arm fast-medium	Wildcard player
Wicket-keepers
7	**Sam Billings**	England	15 June 1991 (age 35)	Right-handed	—	Captain
18	**Tom Banton**	England	11 November 1998 (age 27)	Right-handed	—	
Pace bowlers
1	**Craig Overton**	England	10 April 1994 (age 32)	Right-handed	Right-arm fast-medium	
5	**Mohammad Amir**	Pakistan	13 April 1992 (age 34)	Left-handed	Left-arm fast-medium	UK passport; Replacement player
21	**Matt Henry**	New Zealand	14 December 1991 (age 34)	Right-handed	Right-arm fast-medium	Overseas player
26	Ben Sanderson	England	3 January 1989 (age 37)	Right-handed	Right-arm fast-medium	Wildcard player
—	**Brad Currie**	Scotland	8 November 1998 (age 27)	Right-handed	Left-arm fast-medium	Ruled out through injury
—	**David Payne**	England	15 February 1991 (age 35)	Right-handed	Left-arm fast-medium	Ruled out through injury
Spin bowlers
31	Calvin Harrison	England	29 April 1998 (age 28)	Right-handed	Right-arm leg break	Replacement player
—	**Danny Briggs**	England	30 April 1991 (age 35)	Right-handed	Slow left-arm orthodox	

== Standings ==
=== Women ===
Pos	Team	Pld	W	L	T	NR	Pts	NRR	Qualification
1	Trent Rockets (C)	8	7	1	0	0	28	1.391	Advanced to the Final
2	Sunrisers Leeds	8	5	3	0	0	20	1.031	Advanced to the Eliminator
3	Southern Brave	8	5	3	0	0	20	0.107	Advanced to the Eliminator
4	Manchester Super Giants	8	4	3	0	1	18	0.344	Eliminated
5	Welsh Fire	8	4	4	0	0	16	0.133	Eliminated
6	London Spirit	8	2	5	1	0	10	−0.363	Eliminated
7	Birmingham Phoenix	8	2	5	0	1	10	−1.602	Eliminated
8	MI London	8	1	6	1	0	6	−1.165	Eliminated

Source: Cricinfo
(C) Champions

=== Point summary Women ===
Team	Group matches								Play-offs	
Team	1	2	3	4	5	6	7	8	E	F
Birmingham Phoenix	0	2	2	6	6	6	6	10	—	—
London Spirit	0	4	6	6	6	6	10	10	—	—
Manchester Super Giants	4	6	10	10	14	14	18	18	—	—
MI London	0	0	0	2	2	6	6	6	—	—
Southern Brave	4	8	12	16	20	20	20	20	L	—
Sunrisers Leeds	4	4	4	4	8	12	16	20	W	L
Trent Rockets	4	4	8	12	16	20	24	28	→	W
Welsh Fire	0	4	4	4	8	12	12	16	—	—

Win	Loss	Tie	No result	Eliminated

- Note: The total points at the end of each group match are listed.
- Note: Click on the points or results to see the match summary.

=== Men ===
Pos	Team	Pld	W	L	T	NR	Pts	NRR	Qualification
1	Trent Rockets	8	6	2	0	0	24	0.740	Advanced to the Final
2	Manchester Super Giants	8	5	3	0	0	20	0.791	Advanced to the Eliminator
3	Sunrisers Leeds	8	5	3	0	0	20	0.603	Advanced to the Eliminator
4	MI London	8	5	3	0	0	20	0.241	Eliminated
5	Welsh Fire	8	4	4	0	0	16	−0.900	Eliminated
6	Southern Brave	8	3	5	0	0	12	−0.015	Eliminated
7	London Spirit	8	3	5	0	0	12	−0.098	Eliminated
8	Birmingham Phoenix	8	1	7	0	0	4	−1.318	Eliminated

Source: Cricinfo

=== Point summary Men ===
Team	Group matches								Play-offs	
Team	1	2	3	4	5	6	7	8	E	F
Birmingham Phoenix	4	4	4	4	4	4	4	4	—	—
London Spirit	0	0	4	4	4	4	8	12	—	—
Manchester Super Giants	4	8	8	8	8	12	16	20	W	
MI London	4	4	8	8	12	16	16	20	—	—
Southern Brave	0	0	0	4	8	8	8	12	—	—
Sunrisers Leeds	0	4	8	8	12	16	20	20	L	—
Trent Rockets	0	4	8	12	16	20	24	24		
Welsh Fire	4	8	8	12	16	16	16	16	—	—

Win	Loss	Tie	No result	Eliminated

- Note: The total points at the end of each group match are listed.
- Note: Click on the points or results to see the match summary.

=== Combined ===
Pos	Team	Pld	W	L	T	NR	Pts	NRR
1	Trent Rockets	17	14	3	0	0	64	1.081
2	Sunrisers Leeds	19	11	8	0	0	44	0.778
3	Manchester Super Giants	17	10	6	0	1	42	0.636
4	Southern Brave	17	8	9	0	0	32	−0.003
5	Welsh Fire	16	8	8	0	0	32	−0.377
6	MI London	16	6	9	1	0	26	−0.488
7	London Spirit	16	5	10	1	0	22	−0.261
8	Birmingham Phoenix	16	3	12	0	1	14	−1.482

Updated to match(es) played on 16 August 2026. Source: The Hundred

The Hundred Helix

== Knockout stages ==
=== Women ===
Eliminator			Final
			1	Trent Rockets	92/2 (54 balls)
2	Sunrisers Leeds	116/5 (89 balls)	EW	Sunrisers Leeds	91 (91 balls)
3	Southern Brave	114/7 (100 balls)

==== Final ====
Final
16 August 2026
14:15
Scorecard

Sunrisers Leeds; 91 (91 balls)	v	Trent Rockets; 92/2 (54 balls)
Annabel Sutherland 25 (23); Georgia Adams 2/9 (15 balls)		Sophia Dunkley 41 (23); Dani Gibson 1/9 (5 balls)

Trent Rockets won by 8 wickets
Lord's, London
Umpires: Anna Harris and Surendiran Shanmugam
Player of the match: Georgia Adams (Trent Rockets)

- Trent Rockets won the toss and elected to field.

=== Men ===
Eliminator			Final
			1	Trent Rockets	158/8 (100 balls)
2	Manchester Super Giants	186/4 (100 balls)	EW	Manchester Super Giants	162/5 (98 balls)
3	Sunrisers Leeds	166/7 (100 balls)

==== Final ====
Final
16 August 2026
18:00 (D/N)
Scorecard

Trent Rockets; 158/8 (100 balls)	v	Manchester Super Giants; 162/5 (98 balls)
Aneurin Donald 38 (19); Noor Ahmad 3/33 (20 balls)		Tim Seifert 72 (38); Mohammad Amir 3/29 (20 balls)

Manchester Super Giants won by 5 wickets
Lord's, London
Umpires: Graham Lloyd and Michael Gough
Player of the match: Tim Seifert (Manchester Super Giants)

- Manchester Super Giants won the toss and elected to field.
