= 2026 Birmingham Phoenix season =

Season of the 100-ball cricket tournament

Birmingham Phoenix
2026 season
- Coach: Alistair Maiden (women); Shane Bond (men)
- Captain: Ellyse Perry (women); Donovan Ferreira (men)
- Overseas player: Annerie Dercksen; Fatima Sana; Lucy Hamilton; Alana King; Ellyse Perry; Kayla Reyneke; (women); Ben Dwarshuis; Donovan Ferreira; Mustafizur Rahman; Mitchell Owen; Usman Tariq; (men)

The 2026 season was the Birmingham Phoenix's sixth season of the 100 ball franchise cricket, The Hundred.

== Current squads ==
- **Bold** denotes players with international caps.
- * denotes a player who is unavailable for rest of the season.

=== Women's team ===
No.	Name	Nationality	Date of birth (age)	Batting style	Bowling style	Notes
Batters
6	**Emma Lamb**	England	16 December 1997 (age 28)	Right-handed	Right-arm off break	
12	**Tammy Beaumont**	England	11 March 1991 (age 35)	Right-handed	Right-arm off break	England central contract
22	Davina Perrin	England	8 September 2006 (age 20)	Right-handed	Right-arm medium	
—	Meg Austin	England	7 September 2004 (age 22)	Right-handed	Right-arm leg break	Replacement player
—	Cordelia Griffith	England	19 September 1995 (age 30)	Right-handed	Right-arm medium	Ruled out through injury
All-rounders
8	**Ellyse Perry**	Australia	3 November 1990 (age 35)	Right-handed	Right-arm medium	Captain; Overseas player
14	**Fatima Sana**	Pakistan	8 November 2001 (age 24)	Right-handed	Right-arm medium	Overseas player; Wildcard player
53	**Kayla Reyneke**	South Africa	21 October 2005 (age 20)	Right-handed	Right-arm off break	Overseas player; Replacement player
64	**Alice Capsey**	England	11 August 2004 (age 22)	Right-handed	Right-arm off break	England central contract
77	**Annerie Dercksen**	South Africa	26 April 2001 (age 25)	Right-handed	Right-arm medium	Overseas player
Wicket-keepers
67	Jemima Spence	England	6 July 2006 (age 20)	Right-handed	—	
Pace bowlers
9	Mary Taylor	England	7 October 2004 (age 21)	Right-handed	Right-arm medium	Wildcard player
18	Eva Gray	England	24 May 2000 (age 26)	Right-handed	Right-arm medium	
24	**Lauren Filer**	England	22 December 2000 (age 25)	Right-handed	Right-arm fast-medium	England central contract
—	**Lucy Hamilton**	Australia	8 May 2006 (age 20)	Left-handed	Left-arm fast-medium	Ruled out
—	Esmae MacGregor	England	31 July 2004 (age 22)	Right-handed	Right-arm medium	
Spin bowlers
15	Phoebe Brett	England	5 June 2008 (age 18)	Right-handed	Slow left-arm orthodox	
27	**Alana King**	Australia	22 November 1995 (age 30)	Right-handed	Right-arm leg break	Overseas player
50	**Linsey Smith**	England	10 March 1995 (age 31)	Left-handed	Slow left-arm orthodox	England central contract
—	Eve O'Neill	England	11 May 2008 (age 18)	Right-handed	Right-arm off break	

=== Men's team ===
No.	Name	Nationality	Date of birth (age)	Batting style	Bowling style	Notes
Batters
22	**Donovan Ferreira**	South Africa	21 July 1998 (age 28)	Right-handed	Right-arm off break	Captain; Overseas player
26	Will Smeed	England	26 October 2001 (age 24)	Right-handed	Right-arm off break	
32	Laurie Evans	England	12 October 1987 (age 38)	Right-handed	Right-arm medium	
58	Sean Dickson	South Africa	2 September 1991 (age 35)	Right-handed	Right-arm medium	UK passport; Wildcard player
—	Joe Weatherley	England	19 January 1997 (age 29)	Right-handed	Right-arm off break	Replacement player
All-rounders
2	**Jacob Bethell**	England	23 October 2003 (age 22)	Left-handed	Slow left-arm orthodox	England central contract; Ruled out through injury
16	**Mitchell Owen**	Australia	16 September 2001 (age 24)	Right-handed	Right-arm medium	Overseas player
53	**Rehan Ahmed**	England	13 August 2004 (age 22)	Right-handed	Right-arm leg break	England central contract
—	Ethan Brookes	England	23 May 2001 (age 25)	Right-handed	Right-arm medium	Ruled out through injury
—	**Matt Montgomery**	Germany	10 May 2000 (age 26)	Right-handed	Right-arm off break	Replacement player
—	Jordan Thompson	England	9 October 1996 (age 29)	Left-handed	Right-arm fast-medium	
Wicket-keepers
33	Joe Clarke	England	26 May 1996 (age 30)	Right-handed	—	
Pace bowlers
7	**Saqib Mahmood**	England	25 February 1997 (age 29)	Right-handed	Right-arm fast	
25	Chris Wood	England	27 June 1990 (age 36)	Right-handed	Left-arm fast-medium	
27	**Ben Dwarshuis**	Australia	23 June 1994 (age 32)	Left-handed	Left-arm fast-medium	Overseas player; Replacement player
44	**Scott Currie**	Scotland	2 May 2001 (age 25)	Right-handed	Right-arm fast-medium	
—	Tom Helm	England	7 May 1994 (age 32)	Right-handed	Right-arm fast-medium	Wildcard player
—	**Mustafizur Rahman**	Bangladesh	6 September 1995 (age 31)	Left-handed	Left-arm fast-medium	Overseas player; Ruled out through injury
Spin bowlers
76	**Usman Tariq**	Pakistan	7 June 1995 (age 31)	Right-handed	Right-arm off break	Overseas player

== Standings ==
=== Women ===
Pos	Team	Pld	W	L	T	NR	Pts	NRR	Qualification
1	Trent Rockets (C)	8	7	1	0	0	28	1.391	Advanced to the Final
2	Sunrisers Leeds (R)	8	5	3	0	0	20	1.031	Advanced to the Eliminator
3	Southern Brave	8	5	3	0	0	20	0.107	Advanced to the Eliminator
4	Manchester Super Giants	8	4	3	0	1	18	0.344	Eliminated
5	Welsh Fire	8	4	4	0	0	16	0.133	Eliminated
6	London Spirit	8	2	5	1	0	10	−0.363	Eliminated
7	Birmingham Phoenix	8	2	5	0	1	10	−1.602	Eliminated
8	MI London	8	1	6	1	0	6	−1.165	Eliminated

Source: Cricinfo
(C) Champions; (R) Runners-up

=== Point summary Women ===
Team	Group matches								Play-offs	
Team	1	2	3	4	5	6	7	8	E	F
Birmingham Phoenix	0	2	2	6	6	6	6	10	—	—
London Spirit	0	4	6	6	6	6	10	10	—	—
Manchester Super Giants	4	6	10	10	14	14	18	18	—	—
MI London	0	0	0	2	2	6	6	6	—	—
Southern Brave	4	8	12	16	20	20	20	20	L	—
Sunrisers Leeds	4	4	4	4	8	12	16	20	W	L
Trent Rockets	4	4	8	12	16	20	24	28	→	W
Welsh Fire	0	4	4	4	8	12	12	16	—	—

Win	Loss	Tie	No result	Eliminated

- Note: The total points at the end of each group match are listed.
- Note: Click on the points or results to see the match summary.

=== Men ===
Pos	Team	Pld	W	L	T	NR	Pts	NRR	Qualification
1	Trent Rockets (R)	8	6	2	0	0	24	0.740	Advanced to the Final
2	Manchester Super Giants (C)	8	5	3	0	0	20	0.791	Advanced to the Eliminator
3	Sunrisers Leeds	8	5	3	0	0	20	0.603	Advanced to the Eliminator
4	MI London	8	5	3	0	0	20	0.241	Eliminated
5	Welsh Fire	8	4	4	0	0	16	−0.900	Eliminated
6	Southern Brave	8	3	5	0	0	12	−0.015	Eliminated
7	London Spirit	8	3	5	0	0	12	−0.098	Eliminated
8	Birmingham Phoenix	8	1	7	0	0	4	−1.318	Eliminated

Source: Cricinfo
(C) Champions; (R) Runners-up

=== Point summary Men ===
Team	Group matches								Play-offs	
Team	1	2	3	4	5	6	7	8	E	F
Birmingham Phoenix	4	4	4	4	4	4	4	4	—	—
London Spirit	0	0	4	4	4	4	8	12	—	—
Manchester Super Giants	4	8	8	8	8	12	16	20	W	W
MI London	4	4	8	8	12	16	16	20	—	—
Southern Brave	0	0	0	4	8	8	8	12	—	—
Sunrisers Leeds	0	4	8	8	12	16	20	20	L	—
Trent Rockets	0	4	8	12	16	20	24	24	→	L
Welsh Fire	4	8	8	12	16	16	16	16	—	—

Win	Loss	Tie	No result	Eliminated

- Note: The total points at the end of each group match are listed.
- Note: Click on the points or results to see the match summary.

=== Combined ===
Pos	Team	Pld	W	L	T	NR	Pts	NRR
1	Trent Rockets	17	14	3	0	0	64	1.081
2	Sunrisers Leeds	19	11	8	0	0	44	0.778
3	Manchester Super Giants	17	10	6	0	1	42	0.636
4	Southern Brave	17	8	9	0	0	32	−0.003
5	Welsh Fire	16	8	8	0	0	32	−0.377
6	MI London	16	6	9	1	0	26	−0.488
7	London Spirit	16	5	10	1	0	22	−0.261
8	Birmingham Phoenix	16	3	12	0	1	14	−1.482

Updated to match(es) played on 16 August 2026. Source: The Hundred

The Hundred Helix
