= 2026 Manchester Super Giants season =

Season of the 100-ball cricket tournament

Manchester Super Giants
2026 season
- Coach: Matthew Mott (women); Justin Langer (men)
- Captain: Meg Lanning (women); Aiden Markram (men)
- Overseas player: Maitlan Brown; Richa Ghosh; Meg Lanning; Smriti Mandhana; (women); Michael Bracewell; Heinrich Klaasen; Aiden Markram; Noor Ahmad; Tim Seifert; (men)
- Ground(s): Old Trafford
- The Hundred (Men's): Champions
- The Hundred (Women's): 4th

The 2026 season was the Manchester Super Giants's sixth season of the 100 ball franchise cricket, The Hundred.

== Standings ==
=== Women ===
Pos	Team	Pld	W	L	T	NR	Pts	NRR	Qualification
1	Trent Rockets (C)	8	7	1	0	0	28	1.391	Advanced to the Final
2	Sunrisers Leeds (R)	8	5	3	0	0	20	1.031	Advanced to the Eliminator
3	Southern Brave	8	5	3	0	0	20	0.107	Advanced to the Eliminator
4	Manchester Super Giants	8	4	3	0	1	18	0.344	Eliminated
5	Welsh Fire	8	4	4	0	0	16	0.133	Eliminated
6	London Spirit	8	2	5	1	0	10	−0.363	Eliminated
7	Birmingham Phoenix	8	2	5	0	1	10	−1.602	Eliminated
8	MI London	8	1	6	1	0	6	−1.165	Eliminated

Source: Cricinfo
(C) Champions; (R) Runners-up

=== Point summary Women ===
Team	Group matches								Play-offs	
Team	1	2	3	4	5	6	7	8	E	F
Birmingham Phoenix	0	2	2	6	6	6	6	10	—	—
London Spirit	0	4	6	6	6	6	10	10	—	—
Manchester Super Giants	4	6	10	10	14	14	18	18	—	—
MI London	0	0	0	2	2	6	6	6	—	—
Southern Brave	4	8	12	16	20	20	20	20	L	—
Sunrisers Leeds	4	4	4	4	8	12	16	20	W	L
Trent Rockets	4	4	8	12	16	20	24	28	→	W
Welsh Fire	0	4	4	4	8	12	12	16	—	—

Win	Loss	Tie	No result	Eliminated

- Note: The total points at the end of each group match are listed.
- Note: Click on the points or results to see the match summary.

=== Men ===
Pos	Team	Pld	W	L	T	NR	Pts	NRR	Qualification
1	Trent Rockets (R)	8	6	2	0	0	24	0.740	Advanced to the Final
2	Manchester Super Giants (C)	8	5	3	0	0	20	0.791	Advanced to the Eliminator
3	Sunrisers Leeds	8	5	3	0	0	20	0.603	Advanced to the Eliminator
4	MI London	8	5	3	0	0	20	0.241	Eliminated
5	Welsh Fire	8	4	4	0	0	16	−0.900	Eliminated
6	Southern Brave	8	3	5	0	0	12	−0.015	Eliminated
7	London Spirit	8	3	5	0	0	12	−0.098	Eliminated
8	Birmingham Phoenix	8	1	7	0	0	4	−1.318	Eliminated

Source: Cricinfo
(C) Champions; (R) Runners-up

=== Point summary Men ===
Team	Group matches								Play-offs	
Team	1	2	3	4	5	6	7	8	E	F
Birmingham Phoenix	4	4	4	4	4	4	4	4	—	—
London Spirit	0	0	4	4	4	4	8	12	—	—
Manchester Super Giants	4	8	8	8	8	12	16	20	W	W
MI London	4	4	8	8	12	16	16	20	—	—
Southern Brave	0	0	0	4	8	8	8	12	—	—
Sunrisers Leeds	0	4	8	8	12	16	20	20	L	—
Trent Rockets	0	4	8	12	16	20	24	24	→	L
Welsh Fire	4	8	8	12	16	16	16	16	—	—

Win	Loss	Tie	No result	Eliminated

- Note: The total points at the end of each group match are listed.
- Note: Click on the points or results to see the match summary.

=== Combined ===
Pos	Team	Pld	W	L	T	NR	Pts	NRR
1	Trent Rockets	17	14	3	0	0	64	1.081
2	Sunrisers Leeds	19	11	8	0	0	44	0.778
3	Manchester Super Giants	17	10	6	0	1	42	0.636
4	Southern Brave	17	8	9	0	0	32	−0.003
5	Welsh Fire	16	8	8	0	0	32	−0.377
6	MI London	16	6	9	1	0	26	−0.488
7	London Spirit	16	5	10	1	0	22	−0.261
8	Birmingham Phoenix	16	3	12	0	1	14	−1.482

Updated to match(es) played on 16 August 2026. Source: The Hundred

The Hundred Helix

== Knockout stage ==
Eliminator			Final
			1	Trent Rockets	158/8 (100 balls)
2	Manchester Super Giants	186/4 (100 balls)	EW	Manchester Super Giants	162/5 (98 balls)
3	Sunrisers Leeds	166/7 (100 balls)

=== Eliminator ===
Eliminator
14 August 2026
18:00 (D/N)
Scorecard

Manchester Super Giants; 186/4 (100 balls)	v	Sunrisers Leeds; 166/7 (100 balls)
Paul Walter 80 (46); Brydon Carse 1/22 (20 balls)		Ryan Rickelton 54* (34); Josh Tongue 4/26 (20 balls)

Manchester Super Giants won by 20 runs
The Oval, London
Umpires: Ian Blackwell and Paul Pollard
Player of the match: Josh Tongue (Manchester Super Giants)

- Sunrisers Leeds won the toss and elected to field.

=== Final ===
Final
16 August 2026
18:00 (D/N)
Scorecard

Trent Rockets; 158/8 (100 balls)	v	Manchester Super Giants; 162/5 (98 balls)
Aneurin Donald 38 (19); Noor Ahmad 3/33 (20 balls)		Tim Seifert 72 (38); Mohammad Amir 3/29 (20 balls)

Manchester Super Giants won by 5 wickets
Lord's, London
Umpires: Graham Lloyd and Michael Gough
Player of the match: Tim Seifert (Manchester Super Giants)

- Manchester Super Giants won the toss and elected to field.
