= 2026 Sunrisers Leeds season =

Season of the 100-ball cricket tournament

Sunrisers Leeds
2026 season
- Coach: Adrian Birrell (women); Daniel Vettori (men)
- Captain: Dani Gibson (women); Zak Crawley (men)
- Overseas player: Deepti Sharma; Jess Jonassen; Phoebe Litchfield; Annabel Sutherland; (women); Abrar Ahmed; Nathan Ellis; Mitchell Marsh; Ryan Rickelton; (men)
- Ground(s): Headingley
- The Hundred (Men's): 3rd
- The Hundred (Women's): Runners-up

The 2026 season was the Sunrisers Leeds's sixth season of the 100 ball franchise cricket, The Hundred.

== Current squads ==
- **Bold** denotes players with international caps.
- * denotes a player who is unavailable for rest of the season.

=== Women's team ===
No.	Name	Nationality	Date of birth (age)	Batting style	Bowling style	Notes
Batters
4	**Bryony Smith**	England	12 December 1997 (age 28)	Right-handed	Right-arm off break	
18	**Phoebe Litchfield**	Australia	18 April 2003 (age 23)	Left-handed	Right-arm leg break	Overseas player
76	**Darcey Carter**	Scotland	31 May 2005 (age 21)	Right-handed	Right-arm off break	Wildcard player
—	Tilly Kesteven	England	30 November 2004 (age 21)	Left-handed	Right-arm leg break	Replacement player
—	Flo Miller	England	26 February 2004 (age 22)	Right-handed	Right-arm medium	Ruled out through injury
—	Emily Windsor	England	14 September 1997 (age 28)	Right-handed	Right-arm medium	Replacement player; Ruled out through injury
All-rounders
6	**Deepti Sharma**	India	24 August 1997 (age 29)	Left-handed	Right-arm off break	Overseas player
14	**Annabel Sutherland**	Australia	12 October 2001 (age 24)	Right-handed	Right-arm medium	Overseas player
28	**Dani Gibson**	England	30 April 2001 (age 25)	Right-handed	Right-arm medium	Captain; England central contract
Wicket-keepers
58	**Lauren Winfield-Hill**	England	16 August 1990 (age 36)	Right-handed	—	
—	Katie Jones	England	28 December 2005 (age 20)	Right-handed	—	Replacement player
—	Maddie Ward	England	19 January 2005 (age 21)	Right-handed	Right-arm off break	Ruled out through injury
Pace bowlers
5	Cassidy McCarthy	England	23 July 2002 (age 24)	Right-handed	Right-arm medium	
16	**Kate Cross**	England	3 October 1991 (age 34)	Right-handed	Right-arm medium	
48	Sophia Turner	England	23 April 2003 (age 23)	Right-handed	Right-arm medium	Wildcard player
—	**Rachel Slater**	Scotland	20 November 2001 (age 24)	Right-handed	Left-arm medium	Ruled out through injury
Spin bowlers
3	**Hannah Baker**	England	3 February 2004 (age 22)	Right-handed	Right-arm leg break	
11	Claudie Cooper	England	1 May 2002 (age 24)	Right-handed	Right-arm off break	
21	**Jess Jonassen**	Australia	5 November 1992 (age 33)	Left-handed	Slow left-arm orthodox	Overseas player
—	Chloe Skelton	England	20 June 2001 (age 25)	Right-handed	Right-arm off break	Replacement player

=== Men's team ===
No.	Name	Nationality	Date of birth (age)	Batting style	Bowling style	Notes
Batters
16	**Zak Crawley**	England	3 February 1998 (age 28)	Right-handed	Right-arm off break	Captain; England central contract
28	**Dan Lawrence**	England	12 July 1997 (age 29)	Right-handed	Right-arm off break	
88	**Harry Brook**	England	22 February 1999 (age 27)	Right-handed	Right-arm medium	England central contract
—	Charlie Allison	England	2 March 2005 (age 21)	Right-handed	Right-arm medium	Wildcard player
All-rounders
13	Benny Howell	England	5 October 1988 (age 37)	Right-handed	Right-arm medium	
17	**Mitchell Marsh**	Australia	20 October 1991 (age 34)	Right-handed	Right-arm fast-medium	Overseas player
77	Matt Revis	England	15 November 2001 (age 24)	Right-handed	Right-arm fast-medium	Wildcard player
—	Ed Barnard	England	20 November 1995 (age 30)	Right-handed	Right-arm fast-medium	
Wicket-keepers
44	**Ryan Rickelton**	South Africa	11 July 1996 (age 30)	Left-handed	Slow left-arm orthodox	Overseas player
45	Tom Alsop	England	26 November 1995 (age 30)	Left-handed	Slow left-arm orthodox	
Pace bowlers
30	Tom Lawes	England	25 December 2002 (age 23)	Right-handed	Right-arm fast-medium	
35	**Matthew Potts**	England	29 October 1998 (age 27)	Right-handed	Right-arm fast-medium	England central contract
72	**Nathan Ellis**	Australia	22 September 1994 (age 31)	Right-handed	Right-arm fast-medium	Overseas player
99	**Brydon Carse**	England	31 July 1995 (age 31)	Right-handed	Right-arm fast-medium	England central contract
—	**Reece Topley**	England	21 February 1994 (age 32)	Right-handed	Left-arm fast-medium	
Spin bowlers
22	Liam Patterson-White	England	8 November 1998 (age 27)	Left-handed	Slow left-arm orthodox	
40	**Abrar Ahmed**	Pakistan	11 September 1998 (age 27)	Right-handed	Right-arm leg break	Overseas player

== Standings ==
=== Women ===
Pos	Team	Pld	W	L	T	NR	Pts	NRR	Qualification
1	Trent Rockets (C)	8	7	1	0	0	28	1.391	Advanced to the Final
2	Sunrisers Leeds (R)	8	5	3	0	0	20	1.031	Advanced to the Eliminator
3	Southern Brave	8	5	3	0	0	20	0.107	Advanced to the Eliminator
4	Manchester Super Giants	8	4	3	0	1	18	0.344	Eliminated
5	Welsh Fire	8	4	4	0	0	16	0.133	Eliminated
6	London Spirit	8	2	5	1	0	10	−0.363	Eliminated
7	Birmingham Phoenix	8	2	5	0	1	10	−1.602	Eliminated
8	MI London	8	1	6	1	0	6	−1.165	Eliminated

Source: Cricinfo
(C) Champions; (R) Runners-up

=== Point summary Women ===
Team	Group matches								Play-offs	
Team	1	2	3	4	5	6	7	8	E	F
Birmingham Phoenix	0	2	2	6	6	6	6	10	—	—
London Spirit	0	4	6	6	6	6	10	10	—	—
Manchester Super Giants	4	6	10	10	14	14	18	18	—	—
MI London	0	0	0	2	2	6	6	6	—	—
Southern Brave	4	8	12	16	20	20	20	20	L	—
Sunrisers Leeds	4	4	4	4	8	12	16	20	W	L
Trent Rockets	4	4	8	12	16	20	24	28	→	W
Welsh Fire	0	4	4	4	8	12	12	16	—	—

Win	Loss	Tie	No result	Eliminated

- Note: The total points at the end of each group match are listed.
- Note: Click on the points or results to see the match summary.

=== Men ===
Pos	Team	Pld	W	L	T	NR	Pts	NRR	Qualification
1	Trent Rockets (R)	8	6	2	0	0	24	0.740	Advanced to the Final
2	Manchester Super Giants (C)	8	5	3	0	0	20	0.791	Advanced to the Eliminator
3	Sunrisers Leeds	8	5	3	0	0	20	0.603	Advanced to the Eliminator
4	MI London	8	5	3	0	0	20	0.241	Eliminated
5	Welsh Fire	8	4	4	0	0	16	−0.900	Eliminated
6	Southern Brave	8	3	5	0	0	12	−0.015	Eliminated
7	London Spirit	8	3	5	0	0	12	−0.098	Eliminated
8	Birmingham Phoenix	8	1	7	0	0	4	−1.318	Eliminated

Source: Cricinfo
(C) Champions; (R) Runners-up

=== Point summary Men ===
Team	Group matches								Play-offs	
Team	1	2	3	4	5	6	7	8	E	F
Birmingham Phoenix	4	4	4	4	4	4	4	4	—	—
London Spirit	0	0	4	4	4	4	8	12	—	—
Manchester Super Giants	4	8	8	8	8	12	16	20	W	W
MI London	4	4	8	8	12	16	16	20	—	—
Southern Brave	0	0	0	4	8	8	8	12	—	—
Sunrisers Leeds	0	4	8	8	12	16	20	20	L	—
Trent Rockets	0	4	8	12	16	20	24	24	→	L
Welsh Fire	4	8	8	12	16	16	16	16	—	—

Win	Loss	Tie	No result	Eliminated

- Note: The total points at the end of each group match are listed.
- Note: Click on the points or results to see the match summary.

=== Combined ===
Pos	Team	Pld	W	L	T	NR	Pts	NRR
1	Trent Rockets	17	14	3	0	0	64	1.081
2	Sunrisers Leeds	19	11	8	0	0	44	0.778
3	Manchester Super Giants	17	10	6	0	1	42	0.636
4	Southern Brave	17	8	9	0	0	32	−0.003
5	Welsh Fire	16	8	8	0	0	32	−0.377
6	MI London	16	6	9	1	0	26	−0.488
7	London Spirit	16	5	10	1	0	22	−0.261
8	Birmingham Phoenix	16	3	12	0	1	14	−1.482

Updated to match(es) played on 16 August 2026. Source: The Hundred

The Hundred Helix
