= 2026 Southern Brave season =

Season of the 100-ball cricket tournament

Southern Brave
2026 season
- Coach: Jonathan Batty (women); Hemang Badani (men)
- Captain: Sophie Molineux (women); Chris Jordan (men)
- Overseas player: Lizelle Lee; Sophie Molineux; Jemimah Rodrigues; Laura Wolvaardt; (women); Nikhil Chaudhary; David Miller; Marcus Stoinis; Tristan Stubbs; (men)

The 2026 season was the Southern Brave's sixth season of the 100 ball franchise cricket, The Hundred.

== Current squads ==
- **Bold** denotes players with international caps.
- * denotes a player who is unavailable for rest of the season.

=== Women's side ===
No.	Name	Nationality	Date of birth (age)	Batting style	Bowling style	Notes
Batters
5	**Jemimah Rodrigues**	India	5 September 2000 (age 25)	Right-handed	Right-arm off break	Overseas player
9	**Jodi Grewcock**	England	30 November 2004 (age 21)	Left-handed	Right-arm leg break	
14	**Laura Wolvaardt**	South Africa	26 April 1999 (age 27)	Right-handed	—	Overseas player
22	**Maia Bouchier**	England	5 December 1998 (age 27)	Right-handed	Right-arm medium	England central contract
All-rounders
10	Phoebe Franklin	England	18 February 1998 (age 28)	Right-handed	Right-arm medium	
11	Naomi Dattani	England	28 April 1994 (age 32)	Left-handed	Left-arm medium	Wildcard player
70	**Katherine Fraser**	Scotland	9 April 2005 (age 21)	Right-handed	Right-arm off break	Wildcard player
Wicket-keepers
18	Rebecca Odgers	England	10 February 2003 (age 23)	Right-handed	Right-arm off break	
67	**Lizelle Lee**	South Africa	2 April 1992 (age 34)	Right-handed	Right-arm medium	Overseas player
Pace bowlers
15	Daisy Gibb	England	29 November 2005 (age 20)	Right-handed	Right-arm medium	
45	Ellie Anderson	England	30 October 2003 (age 22)	Right-handed	Right-arm medium	
63	**Lauren Bell**	England	2 January 2001 (age 25)	Right-handed	Right-arm fast-medium	England central contract
95	**Issy Wong**	England	15 May 2002 (age 24)	Right-handed	Right-arm fast-medium	
Spin bowlers
3	**Sarah Glenn**	England	27 August 1999 (age 27)	Right-handed	Right-arm leg break	England central contract
21	**Tilly Corteen-Coleman**	England	23 August 2007 (age 19)	Left-handed	Slow left-arm orthodox	
23	**Sophie Molineux**	Australia	17 January 1998 (age 28)	Left-handed	Left-arm orthodox spin	Captain; Overseas player

=== Men's side ===
No.	Name	Nationality	Date of birth (age)	Batting style	Bowling style	Notes
Batters
7	Ben McKinney	England	4 October 2004 (age 21)	Left-handed	Right-arm off break	
10	**David Miller**	South Africa	10 June 1989 (age 37)	Left-handed	Right-arm off break	Overseas player
18	Saif Zaib	England	22 November 1998 (age 27)	Left-handed	Slow left-arm orthodox	Wildcard player
28	Tom Abell	England	5 March 1994 (age 32)	Right-handed	Right-arm medium	
30	**Tristan Stubbs**	South Africa	4 August 2000 (age 26)	Right-handed	Right-arm off break	
All-rounders
1	**Moeen Ali**	England	18 June 1987 (age 39)	Left-handed	Right-arm off break	Replacement player
4	**Nikhil Chaudhary**	Australia	4 May 1996 (age 30)	Right-handed	Right-arm leg break	Overseas player
17	**Marcus Stoinis**	Australia	16 August 1989 (age 37)	Right-handed	Right-arm fast-medium	Overseas player
34	**Chris Jordan**	England	4 October 1988 (age 37)	Right-handed	Right-arm fast-medium	Captain
44	Caleb Falconer	England	14 September 2006 (age 19)	Right-handed	Right-arm fast-medium	
Wicket-keepers
19	Michael Pepper	England	25 June 1998 (age 28)	Right-handed	—	
39	**Jamie Smith**	England	12 July 2000 (age 26)	Right-handed	—	England central contract
45	Thomas Rew	England	29 November 2007 (age 18)	Right-handed	—	Ruled out through injury
Pace bowlers
8	**Daniel Worrall**	Australia	10 July 1991 (age 35)	Right-handed	Right-arm fast-medium	UK passport
14	**Luke Wood**	England	2 August 1995 (age 31)	Left-handed	Left-arm fast-medium	
22	**Jofra Archer**	England	1 April 1995 (age 31)	Right-handed	Right-arm fast	England central contract
43	Manny Lumsden	England	3 November 2008 (age 17)	Right-handed	Right-arm fast-medium	Wildcard player
Spin bowlers
95	**Adil Rashid**	England	17 February 1988 (age 38)	Right-handed	Right-arm leg break	England central contract

== Standings ==
=== Women ===
Pos	Team	Pld	W	L	T	NR	Pts	NRR	Qualification
1	Trent Rockets (C)	8	7	1	0	0	28	1.391	Advanced to the Final
2	Sunrisers Leeds (R)	8	5	3	0	0	20	1.031	Advanced to the Eliminator
3	Southern Brave	8	5	3	0	0	20	0.107	Advanced to the Eliminator
4	Manchester Super Giants	8	4	3	0	1	18	0.344	Eliminated
5	Welsh Fire	8	4	4	0	0	16	0.133	Eliminated
6	London Spirit	8	2	5	1	0	10	−0.363	Eliminated
7	Birmingham Phoenix	8	2	5	0	1	10	−1.602	Eliminated
8	MI London	8	1	6	1	0	6	−1.165	Eliminated

Source: Cricinfo
(C) Champions; (R) Runners-up

=== Point summary Women ===
Team	Group matches								Play-offs	
Team	1	2	3	4	5	6	7	8	E	F
Birmingham Phoenix	0	2	2	6	6	6	6	10	—	—
London Spirit	0	4	6	6	6	6	10	10	—	—
Manchester Super Giants	4	6	10	10	14	14	18	18	—	—
MI London	0	0	0	2	2	6	6	6	—	—
Southern Brave	4	8	12	16	20	20	20	20	L	—
Sunrisers Leeds	4	4	4	4	8	12	16	20	W	L
Trent Rockets	4	4	8	12	16	20	24	28	→	W
Welsh Fire	0	4	4	4	8	12	12	16	—	—

Win	Loss	Tie	No result	Eliminated

- Note: The total points at the end of each group match are listed.
- Note: Click on the points or results to see the match summary.

=== Men ===
Pos	Team	Pld	W	L	T	NR	Pts	NRR	Qualification
1	Trent Rockets (R)	8	6	2	0	0	24	0.740	Advanced to the Final
2	Manchester Super Giants (C)	8	5	3	0	0	20	0.791	Advanced to the Eliminator
3	Sunrisers Leeds	8	5	3	0	0	20	0.603	Advanced to the Eliminator
4	MI London	8	5	3	0	0	20	0.241	Eliminated
5	Welsh Fire	8	4	4	0	0	16	−0.900	Eliminated
6	Southern Brave	8	3	5	0	0	12	−0.015	Eliminated
7	London Spirit	8	3	5	0	0	12	−0.098	Eliminated
8	Birmingham Phoenix	8	1	7	0	0	4	−1.318	Eliminated

Source: Cricinfo
(C) Champions; (R) Runners-up

=== Point summary Men ===
Team	Group matches								Play-offs	
Team	1	2	3	4	5	6	7	8	E	F
Birmingham Phoenix	4	4	4	4	4	4	4	4	—	—
London Spirit	0	0	4	4	4	4	8	12	—	—
Manchester Super Giants	4	8	8	8	8	12	16	20	W	W
MI London	4	4	8	8	12	16	16	20	—	—
Southern Brave	0	0	0	4	8	8	8	12	—	—
Sunrisers Leeds	0	4	8	8	12	16	20	20	L	—
Trent Rockets	0	4	8	12	16	20	24	24	→	L
Welsh Fire	4	8	8	12	16	16	16	16	—	—

Win	Loss	Tie	No result	Eliminated

- Note: The total points at the end of each group match are listed.
- Note: Click on the points or results to see the match summary.

=== Combined ===
Pos	Team	Pld	W	L	T	NR	Pts	NRR
1	Trent Rockets	17	14	3	0	0	64	1.081
2	Sunrisers Leeds	19	11	8	0	0	44	0.778
3	Manchester Super Giants	17	10	6	0	1	42	0.636
4	Southern Brave	17	8	9	0	0	32	−0.003
5	Welsh Fire	16	8	8	0	0	32	−0.377
6	MI London	16	6	9	1	0	26	−0.488
7	London Spirit	16	5	10	1	0	22	−0.261
8	Birmingham Phoenix	16	3	12	0	1	14	−1.482

Updated to match(es) played on 16 August 2026. Source: The Hundred

The Hundred Helix
