= 2026 Welsh Fire season =

Season of the 100-ball cricket tournament

Welsh Fire
2026 season
- Coach: Michael Klinger (women); Michael Hussey (men)
- Captain: Sophie Devine (women); Phil Salt (men)
- Overseas player: Sophie Devine; Heather Graham; Georgia Voll; Georgia Wareham; (women); Lockie Ferguson; Marco Jansen; Rachin Ravindra; Matthew Short; (men)
- Ground(s): Sophia Gardens

The 2026 season was the Welsh Fire's sixth season of the 100 ball franchise cricket, The Hundred.

== Current squads ==
- **Bold** denotes players with international caps.
- * denotes a player who is unavailable for rest of the season.

=== Women's side ===
No.	Name	Nationality	Date of birth (age)	Batting style	Bowling style	Notes
Batters
6	**Freya Kemp**	England	21 April 2005 (age 21)	Left-handed	Left-arm medium	England central contract
13	**Georgia Voll**	Australia	5 August 2003 (age 23)	Right-handed	Right-arm off break	Overseas player
86	Ella McCaughan	England	26 September 2002 (age 23)	Right-handed	Right-arm leg break	
—	Abi Norgrove	England	17 January 2006 (age 20)	Right-handed	Right-arm off break	
All-rounders
11	**Heather Graham**	Australia	10 May 1996 (age 30)	Right-handed	Right-arm medium	Overseas player
27	Niamh Holland	England	27 October 2004 (age 21)	Right-handed	Right-arm medium	Wildcard player
35	**Georgia Wareham**	Australia	26 May 1999 (age 27)	Right-handed	Right-arm leg break	Overseas player
77	**Sophie Devine**	New Zealand	1 September 1989 (age 37)	Right-handed	Right-arm medium	Captain; Overseas player
—	Fi Morris	England	31 January 1994 (age 32)	Right-handed	Right-arm off break	
Wicket-keepers
17	Rhianna Southby	England	16 October 2000 (age 25)	Right-handed	—	
—	**Sarah Bryce**	Scotland	8 January 2000 (age 26)	Right-handed	—	
Pace bowlers
9	Grace Potts	England	12 July 2002 (age 24)	Right-handed	Right-arm medium	
37	**Em Arlott**	England	23 February 1998 (age 28)	Right-handed	Right-arm medium	
—	Grace Thompson	England	30 May 2007 (age 19)	Right-handed	Right-arm medium	
Spin bowlers
16	Sophia Smale	Wales	8 December 2004 (age 21)	Right-handed	Slow left-arm orthodox	
64	**Georgia Davis**	England	3 June 1999 (age 27)	Right-handed	Right-arm off break	Wildcard player

=== Men's side ===
No.	Name	Nationality	Date of birth (age)	Batting style	Bowling style	Notes
Batters
2	**Matthew Short**	Australia	8 November 1995 (age 30)	Right-handed	Right-arm off break	Overseas player
22	**Jordan Cox**	England	21 October 2000 (age 25)	Right-handed	Right-arm off break	
32	Tom Kohler-Cadmore	England	19 August 1994 (age 32)	Right-handed	Right-arm off break	
55	**Asa Tribe**	Jersey	29 March 2004 (age 22)	Right-handed	Right-arm off break	
66	**Joe Root**	England	30 December 1990 (age 35)	Right-handed	Right-arm off break	England central contract
All-rounders
8	Ben Kellaway	Wales	5 January 2004 (age 22)	Right-handed	Right-arm off break Slow left-arm orthodox	
17	**Rachin Ravindra**	New Zealand	18 November 1999 (age 26)	Left-handed	Slow left-arm orthodox	Overseas player
70	**Marco Jansen**	South Africa	1 May 2000 (age 26)	Right-handed	Left-arm fast-medium	Overseas player
Wicket-keepers
61	**Phil Salt**	England	26 August 1996 (age 30)	Right-handed	Right-arm off break	Captain; England central contract
Pace bowlers
16	**Sam Cook**	England	4 August 1997 (age 29)	Right-handed	Right-arm fast-medium	
19	**Chris Woakes**	England	2 March 1989 (age 37)	Right-handed	Right-arm fast-medium	
69	**Lockie Ferguson**	New Zealand	13 June 1991 (age 35)	Right-handed	Right-arm fast	Overseas player
—	Tom Aspinwall	England	13 March 2004 (age 22)	Right-handed	Right-arm medium	
—	Jordan Clark	England	14 October 1990 (age 35)	Right-handed	Right-arm fast-medium	Wildcard player
—	Dillon Pennington	England	26 February 1999 (age 27)	Right-handed	Right-arm fast-medium	Wildcard player
Spin bowlers
—	Jafer Chohan	England	11 July 2002 (age 24)	Right-handed	Right-arm leg break	

== Fixtures (Women) ==
.

== Standings ==
=== Women ===
Pos	Team	Pld	W	L	T	NR	Pts	NRR	Qualification
1	Trent Rockets (C)	8	7	1	0	0	28	1.391	Advanced to the Final
2	Sunrisers Leeds (R)	8	5	3	0	0	20	1.031	Advanced to the Eliminator
3	Southern Brave	8	5	3	0	0	20	0.107	Advanced to the Eliminator
4	Manchester Super Giants	8	4	3	0	1	18	0.344	Eliminated
5	Welsh Fire	8	4	4	0	0	16	0.133	Eliminated
6	London Spirit	8	2	5	1	0	10	−0.363	Eliminated
7	Birmingham Phoenix	8	2	5	0	1	10	−1.602	Eliminated
8	MI London	8	1	6	1	0	6	−1.165	Eliminated

Source: Cricinfo
(C) Champions; (R) Runners-up

=== Point summary Women ===
Team	Group matches								Play-offs	
Team	1	2	3	4	5	6	7	8	E	F
Birmingham Phoenix	0	2	2	6	6	6	6	10	—	—
London Spirit	0	4	6	6	6	6	10	10	—	—
Manchester Super Giants	4	6	10	10	14	14	18	18	—	—
MI London	0	0	0	2	2	6	6	6	—	—
Southern Brave	4	8	12	16	20	20	20	20	L	—
Sunrisers Leeds	4	4	4	4	8	12	16	20	W	L
Trent Rockets	4	4	8	12	16	20	24	28	→	W
Welsh Fire	0	4	4	4	8	12	12	16	—	—

Win	Loss	Tie	No result	Eliminated

- Note: The total points at the end of each group match are listed.
- Note: Click on the points or results to see the match summary.

=== Men ===
Pos	Team	Pld	W	L	T	NR	Pts	NRR	Qualification
1	Trent Rockets (R)	8	6	2	0	0	24	0.740	Advanced to the Final
2	Manchester Super Giants (C)	8	5	3	0	0	20	0.791	Advanced to the Eliminator
3	Sunrisers Leeds	8	5	3	0	0	20	0.603	Advanced to the Eliminator
4	MI London	8	5	3	0	0	20	0.241	Eliminated
5	Welsh Fire	8	4	4	0	0	16	−0.900	Eliminated
6	Southern Brave	8	3	5	0	0	12	−0.015	Eliminated
7	London Spirit	8	3	5	0	0	12	−0.098	Eliminated
8	Birmingham Phoenix	8	1	7	0	0	4	−1.318	Eliminated

Source: Cricinfo
(C) Champions; (R) Runners-up

=== Point summary Men ===
Team	Group matches								Play-offs	
Team	1	2	3	4	5	6	7	8	E	F
Birmingham Phoenix	4	4	4	4	4	4	4	4	—	—
London Spirit	0	0	4	4	4	4	8	12	—	—
Manchester Super Giants	4	8	8	8	8	12	16	20	W	W
MI London	4	4	8	8	12	16	16	20	—	—
Southern Brave	0	0	0	4	8	8	8	12	—	—
Sunrisers Leeds	0	4	8	8	12	16	20	20	L	—
Trent Rockets	0	4	8	12	16	20	24	24	→	L
Welsh Fire	4	8	8	12	16	16	16	16	—	—

Win	Loss	Tie	No result	Eliminated

- Note: The total points at the end of each group match are listed.
- Note: Click on the points or results to see the match summary.

=== Combined ===
Pos	Team	Pld	W	L	T	NR	Pts	NRR
1	Trent Rockets	17	14	3	0	0	64	1.081
2	Sunrisers Leeds	19	11	8	0	0	44	0.778
3	Manchester Super Giants	17	10	6	0	1	42	0.636
4	Southern Brave	17	8	9	0	0	32	−0.003
5	Welsh Fire	16	8	8	0	0	32	−0.377
6	MI London	16	6	9	1	0	26	−0.488
7	London Spirit	16	5	10	1	0	22	−0.261
8	Birmingham Phoenix	16	3	12	0	1	14	−1.482

Updated to match(es) played on 16 August 2026. Source: The Hundred

The Hundred Helix
