= 2026 London Spirit season =

Season of the 100-ball cricket tournament

London Spirit
2026 season
- Coach: Jon Lewis (women); Andy Flower (men)
- Captain: Charlie Dean (women); Liam Livingstone (men)
- Overseas player: Nadine de Klerk; Deandra Dottin; Grace Harris; Marizanne Kapp; (women); Dewald Brevis; Adam Milne; Lhuan-dre Pretorius; Adam Zampa; (men)
- Ground(s): Lord's
- The Hundred (Men's): 6th
- The Hundred (Women's): 7th

The 2026 season was the London Spirit's sixth season of the 100 ball franchise cricket, The Hundred.

== Current squads ==
- **Bold** denotes players with international caps.
- * denotes a player who is unavailable for rest of the season.

=== Women's team ===
No.	Name	Nationality	Date of birth (age)	Batting style	Bowling style	Notes
Batters
22	**Sterre Kalis**	Netherlands	30 August 1999 (age 27)	Right-handed	Right-arm medium	
23	Marie Kelly	England	9 February 1996 (age 30)	Right-handed	Right-arm off break	
—	**Seren Smale**	England	13 December 2004 (age 21)	Right-handed	—	
All-rounders
5	**Deandra Dottin**	West Indies	21 June 1991 (age 35)	Right-handed	Right-arm medium	Overseas player
7	**Marizanne Kapp**	South Africa	4 January 1990 (age 36)	Right-handed	Right-arm medium	Overseas player
14	Trudy Johnson	England	2 November 2006 (age 19)	Right-handed	Right-arm medium	Wildcard player
17	**Grace Harris**	Australia	18 September 1993 (age 32)	Right-handed	Right-arm off break	Overseas player
24	**Charlie Dean**	England	22 December 2000 (age 25)	Right-handed	Right-arm off break	Captain; England central contract
32	**Nadine de Klerk**	South Africa	16 January 2000 (age 26)	Right-handed	Right-arm medium	Overseas player
99	**Katie George**	England	7 April 1999 (age 27)	Right-handed	Left-arm medium	Replacement player
Wicket-keepers
40	**Amy Jones**	England	13 June 1993 (age 33)	Right-handed	—	England central contract
Pace bowlers
26	**Hannah Rainey**	Scotland	2 June 1997 (age 29)	Right-handed	Right-arm medium	Replacement player
—	**Mahika Gaur**	England (Note: Gaur has also played international cricket for the United Arab Emirates.)	9 March 2006 (age 20)	Right-handed	Left-arm medium	England central contract; Ruled out through injury
—	Phoebe Turner	England	8 August 2003 (age 23)	Right-handed	Right-arm medium	Ruled out through injury
Spin bowlers
21	Josie Groves	England	5 September 2004 (age 21)	Right-handed	Right-arm leg break	
28	**Charis Pavely**	England	25 October 2004 (age 21)	Left-handed	Slow left-arm orthodox	
—	Olivia Barnes	England	9 July 2006 (age 20)	Right-handed	Slow left-arm orthodox	Wildcard player
—	Lucy Higham	England	17 October 1997 (age 28)	Right-handed	Right-arm off break	

=== Men's team ===
No.	Name	Nationality	Date of birth (age)	Batting style	Bowling style	Notes
Batters
50	Kiran Carlson	Wales	16 May 1998 (age 28)	Right-handed	Right-arm off break	Wildcard player
52	**Dewald Brevis**	South Africa	29 April 2003 (age 23)	Right-handed	Right-arm leg break	Overseas player
—	Adam Hose	England	25 October 1992 (age 33)	Right-handed	Right-arm medium	Ruled out through injury
All-rounders
8	**Jamie Overton**	England	10 April 1994 (age 32)	Right-handed	Right-arm fast-medium	England central contract
15	**David Willey**	England	28 February 1990 (age 36)	Left-handed	Left-arm fast-medium	
23	**Liam Livingstone**	England	4 August 1993 (age 33)	Right-handed	Right-arm leg break	Captain
30	James Coles	England	2 April 2004 (age 22)	Right-handed	Slow left-arm orthodox	
Wicket-keepers
27	**Lhuan-dre Pretorius**	South Africa	27 March 2006 (age 20)	Right-handed	—	Overseas player
51	**Jonny Bairstow**	England	26 September 1989 (age 36)	Right-handed	—	
55	**James Rew**	England	11 January 2004 (age 22)	Left-handed	—	
Pace bowlers
19	**Andrew Tye**	Australia	12 December 1986 (age 39)	Right-handed	Right-arm fast-medium	UK passport; Replacement player
20	**Adam Milne**	New Zealand	13 April 1992 (age 34)	Right-handed	Right-arm fast	Overseas player
56	**Tymal Mills**	England	12 August 1992 (age 34)	Right-handed	Left-arm fast	Ruled out through injury
—	Henry Crocombe	England	20 September 2001 (age 24)	Right-handed	Right-arm fast-medium	Wildcard player
—	**Matthew Fisher**	England	9 November 1997 (age 28)	Right-handed	Right-arm fast-medium	
Spin bowlers
88	**Adam Zampa**	Australia	31 March 1992 (age 34)	Right-handed	Right-arm leg break	Overseas player
—	**Mason Crane**	England	18 February 1997 (age 29)	Right-handed	Right-arm leg break	

== Standings ==
=== Women ===
Pos	Team	Pld	W	L	T	NR	Pts	NRR	Qualification
1	Trent Rockets (C)	8	7	1	0	0	28	1.391	Advanced to the Final
2	Sunrisers Leeds (R)	8	5	3	0	0	20	1.031	Advanced to the Eliminator
3	Southern Brave	8	5	3	0	0	20	0.107	Advanced to the Eliminator
4	Manchester Super Giants	8	4	3	0	1	18	0.344	Eliminated
5	Welsh Fire	8	4	4	0	0	16	0.133	Eliminated
6	London Spirit	8	2	5	1	0	10	−0.363	Eliminated
7	Birmingham Phoenix	8	2	5	0	1	10	−1.602	Eliminated
8	MI London	8	1	6	1	0	6	−1.165	Eliminated

Source: Cricinfo
(C) Champions; (R) Runners-up

=== Point summary Women ===
Team	Group matches								Play-offs	
Team	1	2	3	4	5	6	7	8	E	F
Birmingham Phoenix	0	2	2	6	6	6	6	10	—	—
London Spirit	0	4	6	6	6	6	10	10	—	—
Manchester Super Giants	4	6	10	10	14	14	18	18	—	—
MI London	0	0	0	2	2	6	6	6	—	—
Southern Brave	4	8	12	16	20	20	20	20	L	—
Sunrisers Leeds	4	4	4	4	8	12	16	20	W	L
Trent Rockets	4	4	8	12	16	20	24	28	→	W
Welsh Fire	0	4	4	4	8	12	12	16	—	—

Win	Loss	Tie	No result	Eliminated

- Note: The total points at the end of each group match are listed.
- Note: Click on the points or results to see the match summary.

=== Men ===
Pos	Team	Pld	W	L	T	NR	Pts	NRR	Qualification
1	Trent Rockets (R)	8	6	2	0	0	24	0.740	Advanced to the Final
2	Manchester Super Giants (C)	8	5	3	0	0	20	0.791	Advanced to the Eliminator
3	Sunrisers Leeds	8	5	3	0	0	20	0.603	Advanced to the Eliminator
4	MI London	8	5	3	0	0	20	0.241	Eliminated
5	Welsh Fire	8	4	4	0	0	16	−0.900	Eliminated
6	Southern Brave	8	3	5	0	0	12	−0.015	Eliminated
7	London Spirit	8	3	5	0	0	12	−0.098	Eliminated
8	Birmingham Phoenix	8	1	7	0	0	4	−1.318	Eliminated

Source: Cricinfo
(C) Champions; (R) Runners-up

=== Point summary Men ===
Team	Group matches								Play-offs	
Team	1	2	3	4	5	6	7	8	E	F
Birmingham Phoenix	4	4	4	4	4	4	4	4	—	—
London Spirit	0	0	4	4	4	4	8	12	—	—
Manchester Super Giants	4	8	8	8	8	12	16	20	W	W
MI London	4	4	8	8	12	16	16	20	—	—
Southern Brave	0	0	0	4	8	8	8	12	—	—
Sunrisers Leeds	0	4	8	8	12	16	20	20	L	—
Trent Rockets	0	4	8	12	16	20	24	24	→	L
Welsh Fire	4	8	8	12	16	16	16	16	—	—

Win	Loss	Tie	No result	Eliminated

- Note: The total points at the end of each group match are listed.
- Note: Click on the points or results to see the match summary.

=== Combined ===
Pos	Team	Pld	W	L	T	NR	Pts	NRR
1	Trent Rockets	17	14	3	0	0	64	1.081
2	Sunrisers Leeds	19	11	8	0	0	44	0.778
3	Manchester Super Giants	17	10	6	0	1	42	0.636
4	Southern Brave	17	8	9	0	0	32	−0.003
5	Welsh Fire	16	8	8	0	0	32	−0.377
6	MI London	16	6	9	1	0	26	−0.488
7	London Spirit	16	5	10	1	0	22	−0.261
8	Birmingham Phoenix	16	3	12	0	1	14	−1.482

Updated to match(es) played on 16 August 2026. Source: The Hundred

The Hundred Helix
