= Kayla Reyneke =

South African cricketer

Kayla Reyneke (born 21 October 2005) is a South African cricketer who plays for the Western Province women's cricket team and the South Africa women's national cricket team. An all-rounder, she bats right-handed and bowls right-arm orthodox spin (off spin).

Kayla Reyneke was born in Kuils River in the Western Province. She was schooled at Bellville High School, where she excelled at both javelin and cricket.

At under-19 level, she was chosen for the Proteas for both the 2023 Under-19 Women's T20 World Cup in South Africa and the 2025 edition in Malaysia. As well as playing, she also captained the side at the latter edition. In both editions, she was the team's leading wicket taker, taking 8 wickets at an average of 13.5 in the former competition and 11 at 6.3 in the latter

In the 2024/25 season, she was nominated for domestic T20 player of the year for her performances for Western Province Women.

In 2026, she made her debut for the national side in T20is on 10 February 2026 against Pakistan, and her ODI debut the following month against New Zealand. She made an immediate impact, with two player-of-the-match awards in her first four games. On both her T20I and ODI debuts, she scored the winning runs, on both occasions hitting the final ball of the innings for a six.
