= Katie Jones (cricketer) =

English cricketer

Personal information
- Full name: Katherine Abigail Jones
- Born: 28 December 2005 (age 20)
- Batting: Right-handed
- Role: Wicket-keeper

Domestic team information
- Years: Team
- 2021–2024: Gloucestershire
- 2022–2024: Western Storm
- 2025: Somerset

Career statistics
Competition	WLA	WT20
Matches	14	17
Runs scored	111	178
Batting average	13.87	17.80
100s/50s	0/0	0/0
Top score	32	40
Catches/stumpings	7/5	4/15
- Source: CricketArchive, 19 October 2024

Katherine Abigail Jones (born 28 December 2005) is an English cricketer who currently plays for Somerset. She plays as a wicket-keeper and right-handed batter.

== Domestic career ==
Jones made her county debut in 2021, for Gloucestershire against Cornwall. She took two catches and made three stumpings for the side in the 2021 Women's Twenty20 Cup. She was Gloucestershire's second-leading run-scorer in the 2022 Women's Twenty20 Cup, with 111 runs including 40 from 33 deliveries made against Warwickshire. She also took two catches and made two stumpings. She scored 43 runs in four matches in the 2023 Women's Twenty20 Cup, as well as making five stumpings.

Jones was named in the Western Storm Academy for 2022. She was named in a matchday squad for the senior team for the first time in September 2022. She was again named in the academy squad for 2023, before being promoted to the senior squad ahead of the season. She made her debut for the side on 10 May 2023, against The Blaze in the Rachael Heyhoe Flint Trophy. She played seven matches overall for the side that season, batting three times with a top score of 32. In 2024, she played six matches for Western Storm.
