= Aneurin Donald =

English cricketer (born 1996)

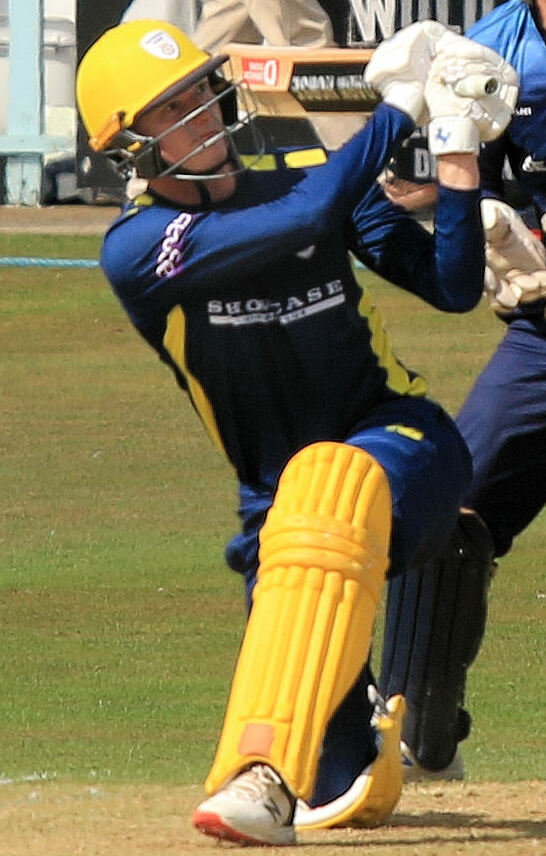
- Donald in 2022

Personal information
- Full name: Aneurin Henry Thomas Donald
- Born: 20 December 1996 (age 29); Swansea, Wales
- Nickname: Nye
- Batting: Right-handed
- Bowling: Right-arm off break
- Role: Batsman

International information
- National side: England
- T20I debut (cap 111): 15 September 2026 v Sri Lanka
- Last T20I: 21 November 2026 v Australia

Domestic team information
- Years: Team
- 2014–2018: Glamorgan (squad no. 12)
- 2018: → Hampshire (on loan)
- 2019–2023: Hampshire (squad no. 12)
- 2023: → Derbyshire (on loan)
- 2024–present: Derbyshire
- 2024–2025: Birmingham Phoenix
- 2026: Trent Rockets

Career statistics
Competition	T20I	FC	LA	T20
Matches	4	76	50	116
Runs scored	56	3,709	1,023	2,510
Batting average	14.00	30.40	23.25	23.67
100s/50s	0/0	3/22	2/4	0/18
Top score	21	234	115	91
Catches/stumpings	3/–	74/0	24/–	62/2
- Source: Cricinfo, 21 November 2026

Aneurin Henry Thomas Donald (/əˈnaɪərɪn/an-EYE-rin; born 20 December 1996) is a Welsh cricketer who has played first-class cricket for Glamorgan, Hampshire and Derbyshire as a right-handed batsman and right-arm off spin bowler. In December 2015 he was named in England's squad for the 2016 Under-19 Cricket World Cup.

== Career ==
Donald initially learnt to play cricket at Gorseinon CC.

=== Glamorgan: 2016–2018 ===
Donald progressed through the Glamorgan Cricket Academy, and spent a summer in Australia at the Darren Lehmann Cricket Academy, before moving back to his native Wales in 2016.

On 17 July 2016, Donald equalled Ravi Shastri's record for fastest ever double hundred in first-class cricket, off just 123 balls, eventually scoring 234 off 136 balls in an innings that was also his maiden County Championship hundred for Glamorgan. His record was surpassed in 2017.

His form then suffered for the following two seasons, and by the 2018 season he was dropped from Glamorgan's County Championship and 50-over sides, but remained as a T20 opening batsman.

=== Hampshire: 2018–2023 ===
Offered a new three-year contract from 2019 to 2021 by Glamorgan, Donald who has ambitions to play for the England national side, decided for career reasons on 23 August 2018 to sign a two-year deal with Hampshire for the 2019 and 2020 seasons. As a result, Glamorgan offered Donald to Hampshire as a loan player for the remainder of the 2018 season, and he hence moved with immediate effect.

In the 2019 season, Donald broke into the Hampshire County Championship side. In his first first-class game for Hampshire, he hit 75 from 56 balls against Warwickshire, and in July he took the same attack for 173 off 144 balls in a superb counterattacking innings from No. 6. He finished the season with 554 runs at 39.57 with a strike rate of 83.30.

In December 2019, Donald was ruled out of the 2020 cricket season, after tearing his anterior cruciate ligament. in 2022 Donald was part of Hampshire's 2022 T20 Blast winning team. In 2023, Donald was loaned to Derbyshire. At the conclusion of the 2023 season it was announced that Donald would join Derbyshire permanently at the end of his Hampshire contract in October 2023.

=== Derbyshire: 2024–present ===
Donald scored 315 runs for Derbyshire during their 2024 T20 Blast campaign, including setting a club record for the fastest 50 off just 19 balls, as well as making 13 county championship appearances and as a result was rewarded with a new two-year contract in February 2025. On 6 July 2025 he scored the joint fastest T20 Blast 50 by scoring 51 off 13 balls against Yorkshire. He signed a new two-year contract in November 2025, tying him into the club until at least the end of the 2028 season.

=== England: 2026–present ===
After a successful season with both Derbyshire in the Vitality Blast and Trent Rockets in the Hundred, Donald was added to the England IT20 squad for the Sri Lanka tour of England in 2026. On 15 September 2026, Donald made his debut for England in a T20I against Sri Lanka in Southampton, where he scored 12 runs before being caught off the bowling of Dunith Wellalage.

== Playing style ==
Donald is known for his exuberant and attacking playing style. In the 2016 Under-19 Cricket World Cup he played the first ever 'Scooping Slap Shot' in a match against Zimbabwe.
