= List of Welsh Fire cricketers =

Welsh Fire were formed in 2019, and played their first Hundred match in the 2021 season of The Hundred against Northern Superchargers for both the Men's team and the Women's team. Hundred matches are classed as Twenty20 matches and so have Twenty20 status or Women's Twenty20 status. The players in this list have all played at least one Hundred match for the Welsh Fire Men's or Women's team.

Players are listed in order of appearance, where players made their debut in the same match, they are ordered by batting order. Players in Bold were overseas players for the Welsh Fire.

== Key ==
**General**

- ♠ – Captain
- † – Wicket-keeper
- **First** – Year of debut for Welsh Fire
- **Last** – Year of latest match played for Welsh Fire
- **Mat** – Number of matches played for Welsh Fire
- **Win%** – Winning percentage

**Batting**

- **Inn** – Number of innings batted
- **NO** – Number of innings not out
- **Runs** – Runs scored in career
- **HS** – Highest score
- **100** – Centuries scored
- **50** – Half-centuries scored
- **Avg** – Runs scored per dismissal
- * – Batsman remained not out

**Bowling**

- **Balls** – Balls bowled in career
- **Wkt** – Wickets taken in career
- **BBI** – Best bowling in an innings
- **BBM** – Best bowling in a match
- **Ave** – Average runs per wicket

**Fielding**

- **Ca** – Catches taken
- **St** – Stumpings effected

== List of players ==
=== Women's players ===
| No. | Name | Nationality | First | Last | Mat | Runs | HS | Avg | Balls | Wkt | BBI | Ave | Ca | St |
| No. | Name | Nationality | First | Last | Mat | Batting | | | Bowling | | | | Fielding | |
|---|---|---|---|---|---|---|---|---|---|---|---|---|---|---|
| 1 | Bryony Smith | England | 2021 | 2021 | 8 | 137 | 38 | 17.12 | 134 | 4 | 1/16 | 48.25 | 2 | 0 |
| 2 | **Hayley Matthews** | West Indies | 2021 | 2025 | 33 | 795 | 78* | 27.41 | 517 | 39 | 4/14 | 16.95 | 8 | 0 |
| 3 | Lissy Macleod | England | 2021 | 2021 | 5 | 33 | 19* | 11.00 | 5 | 0 | – | – | 0 | 0 |
| 4 | **Georgia Redmayne** | Australia | 2021 | 2021 | 8 | 187 | 38* | 31.16 | 0 | 0 | – | – | 2 | 0 |
| 5 | Sarah Taylor † | England | 2021 | 2021 | 7 | 78 | 29 | 13.00 | 0 | 0 | – | – | 1 | 1 |
| 6 | Sophie Luff ♠ | England | 2021 | 2021 | 8 | 79 | 30 | 13.16 | 0 | 0 | – | – | 2 | 0 |
| 7 | Georgia Hennessy | England | 2021 | 2021 | 8 | 58 | 23* | 14.50 | 110 | 2 | 2/24 | 77.50 | 3 | 0 |
| 8 | **Piepa Cleary** | Australia | 2021 | 2021 | 8 | 18 | 8 | 3.60 | 130 | 6 | 2/21 | 29.16 | 3 | 0 |
| 9 | Alex Griffiths | Wales | 2021 | 2025 | 18 | 42 | 11 | 7.00 | 145 | 6 | 2/15 | 33.33 | 1 | 0 |
| 10 | Katie George | England | 2021 | 2025 | 19 | 60 | 16 | 5.45 | 30 | 1 | 1/27 | 58.00 | 5 | 0 |
| 11 | Nicole Harvey | England | 2021 | 2021 | 8 | 3 | 3* | 1.50 | 95 | 4 | 2/11 | 28.00 | 2 | 0 |
| 12 | Hannah Baker | England | 2021 | 2022 | 8 | 7 | 5* | 3.50 | 82 | 3 | 1/9 | 36.00 | 2 | 0 |
| 13 | Nat Wraith † | England | 2021 | 2021 | 1 | 3 | 3* | – | 0 | 0 | – | – | 0 | 0 |
| 14 | Tammy Beaumont ♠ | England | 2022 | 2025 | 30 | 686 | 118 | 25.41 | 0 | 0 | – | – | 12 | 0 |
| 15 | **Rachael Haynes** | Australia | 2022 | 2022 | 4 | 35 | 14 | 8.75 | 0 | 0 | – | – | 3 | 0 |
| 16 | **Annabel Sutherland** | Australia | 2022 | 2022 | 6 | 88 | 34 | 17.60 | 92 | 4 | 1/8 | 32.50 | 5 | 0 |
| 17 | Fran Wilson | England | 2022 | 2022 | 6 | 49 | 20 | 9.80 | 0 | 0 | – | – | 0 | 0 |
| 18 | Fi Morris | England | 2022 | 2022 | 2 | 3 | 3* | – | 0 | 0 | – | – | 0 | 0 |
| 19 | Sarah Bryce † | Scotland | 2022 | 2026 | 33 | 433 | 51* | 21.65 | 0 | 0 | – | – | 14 | 12 |
| 20 | Lauren Filer | England | 2022 | 2022 | 6 | 29 | 14 | 9.66 | 91 | 2 | 1/13 | 56.50 | 0 | 0 |
| 21 | Alex Hartley | England | 2022 | 2023 | 10 | 3 | 2* | – | 180 | 7 | 1/12 | 31.57 | 1 | 0 |
| 22 | Claire Nicholas | Wales | 2022 | 2023 | 14 | 5 | 3* | 2.50 | 200 | 9 | 2/17 | 27.55 | 5 | 0 |
| 23 | **Nicola Carey** | Australia | 2022 | 2022 | 4 | 76 | 28 | 19.00 | 60 | 4 | 3/18 | 22.25 | 1 | 0 |
| 24 | **Maddy Green** | New Zealand | 2022 | 2022 | 1 | 10 | 10 | 10.00 | 0 | 0 | – | – | 0 | 0 |
| 25 | **Laura Harris** | Australia | 2023 | 2023 | 8 | 91 | 37 | 13.00 | 0 | 0 | – | – | 1 | 0 |
| 26 | Georgia Elwiss | England | 2023 | 2025 | 24 | 212 | 36* | 16.31 | 140 | 4 | 2/4 | 45.00 | 7 | 0 |
| 27 | Emily Windsor | England | 2023 | 2025 | 8 | 7 | 4 | 2.33 | 0 | 0 | – | – | 0 | 0 |
| 28 | Freya Davies | England | 2023 | 2025 | 24 | 27 | 8 | 3.86 | 406 | 26 | 3/16 | 18.81 | 4 | 0 |
| 29 | **Shabnim Ismail** | South Africa | 2023 | 2025 | 21 | 23 | 9* | 11.50 | 381 | 25 | 3/12 | 17.12 | 13 | 0 |
| 30 | Sophia Dunkley | England | 2023 | 2025 | 23 | 628 | 69* | 28.55 | 60 | 4 | 2/15 | 19.75 | 10 | 0 |
| 31 | Ella McCaughan | England | 2023 | 2026 | 13 | 64 | 27 | 9.14 | 0 | 0 | – | – | 1 | 0 |
| 32 | **Jess Jonassen** | Australia | 2024 | 2025 | 16 | 298 | 54 | 24.75 | 299 | 23 | 4/10 | 15.17 | 2 | 0 |
| 33 | Phoebe Franklin | England | 2024 | 2024 | 8 | 17 | 8* | 17.00 | 0 | 0 | – | – | 4 | 0 |
| 34 | Georgia Davis | England | 2024 | 2025 | 13 | 10 | 6 | 3.33 | 185 | 12 | 3/33 | 20.92 | 1 | 0 |
| 35 | Beth Langston | England | 2024 | 2024 | 5 | 1 | 1 | 1.00 | 50 | 3 | 1/8 | 26.00 | 0 | 0 |
| 36 | Katie Levick | England | 2025 | 2025 | 8 | 19 | 11 | 9.50 | 125 | 5 | 3/26 | 32.40 | 2 | 0 |
| 37 | **Georgia Voll** | Australia | 2026 | 2026 | 8 | 250 | 78 | 31.25 | 15 | 1 | 1/9 | 18.00 | 5 | 0 |
| 38 | Freya Kemp | England | 2026 | 2026 | 8 | 192 | 72* | 32.00 | 0 | 0 | – | – | 1 | 0 |
| 39 | **Sophie Devine** ♠ | New Zealand | 2026 | 2026 | 4 | 130 | 52 | 43.33 | 20 | 3 | 2/15 | 11.00 | 0 | 0 |
| 40 | **Georgia Wareham** ♠ | Australia | 2026 | 2026 | 8 | 163 | 50 | 32.60 | 149 | 5 | 2/23 | 37.80 | 6 | 0 |
| 41 | **Heather Graham** | Australia | 2026 | 2026 | 8 | 61 | 35* | 20.33 | 143 | 11 | 4/19 | 16.63 | 9 | 0 |
| 42 | Em Arlott | England | 2026 | 2026 | 5 | 8 | 6* | 4.00 | 45 | 2 | 1/15 | 39.00 | 3 | 0 |
| 43 | Niamh Holland | England | 2026 | 2026 | 8 | 23 | 12* | 7.66 | 10 | 0 | – | – | 2 | 0 |
| 44 | Rhianna Southby † | England | 2026 | 2026 | 7 | 10 | 8* | 10.00 | 0 | 0 | – | – | 0 | 3 |
| 45 | Sophia Smale | Wales | 2026 | 2026 | 8 | 3 | 3* | – | 155 | 7 | 2/17 | 22.57 | 3 | 0 |
| 46 | Grace Potts | England | 2026 | 2026 | 8 | – | – | – | 135 | 11 | 3/23 | 15.00 | 0 | 0 |
| 47 | **Orla Prendergast** | Ireland | 2026 | 2026 | 4 | 17 | 12 | 4.25 | 75 | 6 | 4/18 | 17.66 | 1 | 0 |
| 48 | Grace Thompson | England | 2026 | 2026 | 3 | 25 | 16 | 8.33 | 0 | 0 | – | – | 3 | 0 |
| 49 | Abi Norgrove | England | 2026 | 2026 | 1 | 4 | 4* | – | 0 | 0 | – | – | 1 | 0 |

=== Men's players ===
| No. | Name | Nationality | First | Last | Mat | Runs | HS | Avg | Balls | Wkt | BBI | Ave | Ca | St |
| No. | Name | Nationality | First | Last | Mat | Batting | | | Bowling | | | | Fielding | |
|---|---|---|---|---|---|---|---|---|---|---|---|---|---|---|
| 1 | Jonny Bairstow ♠† | England | 2021 | 2025 | 21 | 586 | 86* | 30.84 | 0 | 0 | – | – | 7 | 1 |
| 2 | Tom Banton † | England | 2021 | 2022 | 14 | 179 | 44 | 12.78 | 0 | 0 | – | – | 5 | 0 |
| 3 | Ben Duckett ♠ | England | 2021 | 2022 | 16 | 452 | 65 | 30.13 | 0 | 0 | – | – | 7 | 0 |
| 4 | **Glenn Phillips** | New Zealand | 2021 | 2024 | 24 | 395 | 80 | 21.94 | 39 | 0 | – | – | 16 | 0 |
| 5 | **James Neesham** | New Zealand | 2021 | 2021 | 7 | 47 | 30* | 9.40 | 80 | 7 | 3/5 | 17.28 | 2 | 0 |
| 6 | Ian Cockbain | England | 2021 | 2021 | 5 | 87 | 32 | 29.00 | 0 | 0 | – | – | 4 | 0 |
| 7 | Matt Critchley | England | 2021 | 2022 | 10 | 151 | 55* | 30.20 | 165 | 7 | 1/18 | 34.57 | 2 | 0 |
| 8 | Liam Plunkett | England | 2021 | 2021 | 1 | – | – | – | 15 | 0 | – | – | 0 | 0 |
| 9 | **Qais Ahmad** | Afghanistan | 2021 | 2021 | 8 | 15 | 13* | 7.50 | 155 | 8 | 4/13 | 23.62 | 0 | 0 |
| 10 | Jake Ball | England | 2021 | 2024 | 14 | 1 | 1* | – | 266 | 16 | 4/29 | 22.93 | 3 | 0 |
| 11 | David Payne | England | 2021 | 2025 | 38 | 54 | 28 | 5.40 | 636 | 34 | 3/14 | 28.50 | 9 | 0 |
| 12 | Josh Cobb ♠ | England | 2021 | 2022 | 12 | 87 | 28* | 9.66 | 55 | 2 | 1/14 | 38.00 | 6 | 0 |
| 13 | Leus du Plooy | South Africa | 2021 | 2022 | 10 | 237 | 43 | 26.33 | 0 | 0 | – | – | 1 | 0 |
| 14 | Ryan Higgins | England | 2021 | 2022 | 5 | 29 | 11 | 14.50 | 60 | 6 | 3/21 | 12.16 | 1 | 0 |
| 15 | Matt Milnes | England | 2021 | 2021 | 4 | 1 | 1* | 1.00 | 75 | 3 | 1/28 | 45.33 | 1 | 0 |
| 16 | Graeme White | England | 2021 | 2021 | 3 | 17 | 14 | 17.00 | 45 | 0 | – | – | 1 | 0 |
| 17 | Luke Fletcher | England | 2021 | 2021 | 4 | 6 | 4 | 6.00 | 65 | 2 | 1/24 | 48.00 | 0 | 0 |
| 18 | David Lloyd | Wales | 2021 | 2021 | 2 | 6 | 6 | 3.00 | 0 | 0 | – | – | 0 | 0 |
| 19 | Joe Clarke † | England | 2022 | 2024 | 23 | 347 | 69* | 18.26 | 0 | 0 | – | – | 14 | 0 |
| 20 | Ollie Pope | England | 2022 | 2022 | 2 | 10 | 10 | 5.00 | 0 | 0 | – | – | 0 | 0 |
| 21 | Sam Hain | England | 2022 | 2022 | 3 | 37 | 23 | 12.33 | 0 | 0 | – | – | 1 | 0 |
| 22 | **Adam Zampa** | Australia | 2022 | 2022 | 4 | 26 | 14* | 26.00 | 70 | 4 | 2/17 | 21.75 | 1 | 0 |
| 23 | **Noor Ahmad** | Afghanistan | 2022 | 2022 | 1 | 9 | 9* | – | 15 | 0 | – | – | 0 | 0 |
| 24 | **David Miller** | South Africa | 2022 | 2022 | 7 | 73 | 35* | 12.16 | 0 | 0 | – | – | 3 | 0 |
| 25 | George Scrimshaw | England | 2022 | 2022 | 4 | 5 | 5* | – | 70 | 4 | 2/22 | 30.75 | 1 | 0 |
| 26 | **Dwaine Pretorius** | South Africa | 2022 | 2022 | 5 | 71 | 29 | 23.66 | 85 | 4 | 2/30 | 33.75 | 3 | 0 |
| 27 | Jacob Bethell | England | 2022 | 2022 | 2 | 10 | 10 | 5.00 | 0 | 0 | – | – | 0 | 0 |
| 28 | **Ish Sodhi** | New Zealand | 2022 | 2022 | 3 | 2 | 1* | 2.00 | 60 | 4 | 2/14 | 17.75 | 0 | 0 |
| 29 | Luke Wells | England | 2023 | 2025 | 20 | 279 | 57 | 16.41 | 100 | 3 | 1/17 | 50.00 | 7 | 0 |
| 30 | David Willey | England | 2023 | 2024 | 16 | 127 | 31 | 18.14 | 218 | 17 | 3/14 | 15.41 | 8 | 0 |
| 31 | Stephen Eskinazi | England | 2023 | 2025 | 14 | 361 | 58 | 27.76 | 0 | 0 | – | – | 2 | 0 |
| 32 | Tom Abell ♠ | England | 2023 | 2025 | 23 | 315 | 48 | 21.00 | 0 | 0 | – | – | 9 | 0 |
| 33 | Ben Green | England | 2023 | 2023 | 5 | 51 | 25 | 17.00 | 40 | 2 | 2/26 | 25.00 | 3 | 0 |
| 34 | Roelof van der Merwe | Netherlands | 2023 | 2023 | 8 | 11 | 7* | 11.00 | 110 | 7 | 2/16 | 24.42 | 3 | 0 |
| 35 | **Shaheen Afridi** | Pakistan | 2023 | 2023 | 6 | 5 | 3* | – | 100 | 6 | 2/22 | 21.00 | 1 | 0 |
| 36 | **Haris Rauf** | Pakistan | 2023 | 2024 | 12 | 4 | 4 | 2.00 | 187 | 16 | 3/20 | 13.31 | 1 | 0 |
| 37 | **Matt Henry** | New Zealand | 2023 | 2025 | 10 | 32 | 11* | 16.00 | 161 | 15 | 3/19 | 11.66 | 4 | 0 |
| 38 | **Lockie Ferguson** | New Zealand | 2023 | 2026 | 10 | – | – | – | 179 | 11 | 4/27 | 24.36 | 3 | 0 |
| 39 | Tom Kohler-Cadmore | England | 2024 | 2026 | 21 | 356 | 84 | 23.73 | 0 | 0 | – | – | 9 | 0 |
| 40 | Mason Crane | England | 2024 | 2024 | 5 | 17 | 12* | – | 80 | 4 | 1/15 | 27.00 | 2 | 0 |
| 41 | **Josh Little** | Ireland | 2024 | 2024 | 2 | 1 | 1* | – | 40 | 3 | 2/21 | 12.33 | 1 | 0 |
| 42 | Ross Whiteley | England | 2024 | 2024 | 3 | 2 | 2* | 2.00 | 0 | 0 | – | – | 1 | 0 |
| 43 | **Steve Smith** | Australia | 2025 | 2025 | 8 | 137 | 47* | 19.57 | 0 | 0 | – | – | 9 | 0 |
| 44 | Saif Zaib | England | 2025 | 2025 | 8 | 57 | 21 | 11.40 | 45 | 2 | 1/6 | 35.00 | 1 | 0 |
| 45 | Paul Walter | England | 2025 | 2025 | 5 | 26 | 15 | 5.20 | 85 | 1 | 1/36 | 155.00 | 5 | 0 |
| 46 | **Chris Green** | Australia | 2025 | 2025 | 8 | 79 | 32* | 19.75 | 153 | 11 | 3/19 | 20.36 | 4 | 0 |
| 47 | Josh Hull | England | 2025 | 2025 | 5 | 3 | 3* | – | 85 | 3 | 2/36 | 50.00 | 1 | 0 |
| 48 | **Riley Meredith** | Australia | 2025 | 2025 | 6 | 7 | 7* | – | 117 | 12 | 4/9 | 13.58 | 1 | 0 |
| 49 | Ajeet Singh Dale | England | 2025 | 2025 | 3 | – | – | – | 45 | 2 | 1/26 | 53.00 | 0 | 0 |
| 50 | Ben Kellaway | Wales | 2025 | 2026 | 9 | 35 | 33 | 11.66 | 70 | 4 | 2/10 | 22.50 | 8 | 0 |
| 51 | Phil Salt ♠† | England | 2026 | 2026 | 8 | 195 | 48 | 27.85 | 0 | 0 | – | – | 4 | 0 |
| 52 | **Matthew Short** | Australia | 2026 | 2026 | 7 | 238 | 71 | 39.66 | 20 | 3 | 2/13 | 9.66 | 2 | 0 |
| 53 | Joe Root | England | 2026 | 2026 | 8 | 186 | 58* | 31.00 | 15 | 0 | – | – | 3 | 0 |
| 54 | **Rachin Ravindra** | New Zealand | 2026 | 2026 | 8 | 170 | 98 | 24.28 | 95 | 6 | 2/27 | 23.66 | 4 | 0 |
| 55 | Jordan Cox | England | 2026 | 2026 | 8 | 149 | 44 | 21.28 | 0 | 0 | – | – | 5 | 0 |
| 56 | Asa Tribe | Jersey | 2026 | 2026 | 4 | 24 | 13* | – | 0 | 0 | – | – | 2 | 0 |
| 57 | **Marco Jansen** | South Africa | 2026 | 2026 | 8 | 13 | 5* | 3.25 | 152 | 6 | 2/16 | 35.00 | 2 | 0 |
| 58 | Chris Woakes | England | 2026 | 2026 | 8 | 24 | 13* | – | 150 | 7 | 2/18 | 30.28 | 2 | 0 |
| 59 | Sam Cook | England | 2026 | 2026 | 8 | – | – | – | 140 | 8 | 3/14 | 29.87 | 2 | 0 |
| 60 | Jordan Clark | England | 2026 | 2026 | 2 | – | – | – | 10 | 1 | 1/27 | 27.00 | 0 | 0 |

== See also ==
- Welsh Fire
- The Hundred
