= 2021 Welsh Fire season =

Season of the 100-ball cricket tournament

Welsh Fire
2021 season
- Coach: (South Africa) Gary Kirsten (men's team) (Australia) Matthew Mott (women's team)
- Captain: (England) Jonny Bairstow (men's team) (England) Sophie Luff (women's team)
- Overseas player: (New Zealand) James Neesham (New Zealand) Glenn Phillips (Afghanistan) Qais Ahmad (men's team) (Australia) Piepa Cleary (Cricket West Indies) Hayley Matthews (Australia) Georgia Redmayne (women's team)
- Ground(s): Sophia Gardens
- The Hundred (Men's): 7th
- The Hundred (Women's): 8th
- Most runs: Ben Duckett: 232 (Men's team); Hayley Matthews: 221 (Women's team)
- Most wickets: Hayley Matthews: 11 (Women's team); Qais Ahmad: 8 (Men's team)
- Most catches: Glenn Phillips: 5 (Men's team); Katie George: 4 (Women's team)

The 2021 season was Welsh Fire's first season of the new franchise 100 ball cricket, The Hundred.

== Players ==
The first players assigned to the Welsh Fire were England women's centrally contracted players Katie George and Bryony Smith, England men's red-ball contracted player Jonny Bairstow, and two "local icons" in Somerset's Tom Banton and Glamorgan's Colin Ingram.

=== Men's side ===
In the initial draft for the men's Hundred on 20 October 2019, Welsh Fire selected Australia internationals Mitchell Starc and Steve Smith as overseas players at the £125,000 salary level, as well as Qais Ahmed at the £60,000 level. Smith was appointed as captain of the team in February 2020. After the Hundred was delayed due to the COVID-19 pandemic, Jonny Bairstow lost his England central contract and was replaced in that capacity at Welsh Fire by Ollie Pope. Smith and Starc were also not retained for the rescheduled competition. Bairstow was ultimately re-signed by the Fire as one of their salary-banded players, and appointed as captain in July 2021.

- **Bold** denotes players with international caps.

| S/N | Name | Nat. | Date of birth (age) | Batting style | Bowling style | Notes |
Batsmen
| 1 | Ian Cockbain | (England) | 17 February 1987 (age 39) | Right-handed | Right-arm medium | |
| 17 | **Ben Duckett** | (England) | 17 October 1994 (age 31) | Left-handed | — | |
| 18 | **Tom Banton** | (England) | 11 November 1998 (age 27) | Right-handed | — | |
| 76 | Leus du Plooy | (South Africa) | 12 January 1995 (age 31) | Left-handed | Slow left-arm orthodox | Wildcard pick; EU passport |
| — | **Ollie Pope** | (England) | 2 January 1998 (age 28) | Right-handed | — | Centrally contracted |
All-rounders
| 4 | Josh Cobb | (England) | 17 August 1990 (age 35) | Right-handed | Right-arm off break | |
| 20 | Matt Critchley | (England) | 13 August 1996 (age 29) | Right-handed | Right-arm leg break | |
| 29 | Ryan Higgins | (England) | 6 January 1995 (age 31) | Right-handed | Right-arm fast-medium | |
| 50 | **James Neesham** | (New Zealand) | 17 September 1990 (age 35) | Left-handed | Right-arm fast-medium | Overseas player |
| 73 | David Lloyd | (Wales) | 15 June 1992 (age 33) | Right-handed | Right-arm medium | |
Wicketkeepers
| 23 | **Glenn Phillips** | (New Zealand) | 6 December 1996 (age 29) | Right-handed | Right-arm off break | Overseas player |
| 51 | **Jonny Bairstow** | (England) | 26 September 1989 (age 36) | Right-handed | — | Captain |
Pace bowlers
| 7 | David Payne | (England) | 15 February 1991 (age 35) | Right-handed | Left-arm fast-medium | |
| 8 | Matt Milnes | (England) | 29 July 1994 (age 31) | Right-handed | Right-arm fast-medium | Replacement player |
| 14 | **Jake Ball** | (England) | 14 March 1991 (age 34) | Right-handed | Right-arm fast-medium | |
| 19 | Luke Fletcher | (England) | 18 September 1988 (age 37) | Right-handed | Right-arm fast-medium | Replacement player |
| 28 | **Liam Plunkett** | (England) | 6 April 1985 (age 40) | Right-handed | Right-arm fast-medium | |
Spin bowlers
| 30 | **Qais Ahmad** | (Afghanistan) | 15 August 2000 (age 25) | Right-handed | Right-arm leg break | Overseas player |
| 87 | Graeme White | (England) | 18 April 1987 (age 38) | Right-handed | Slow left-arm orthodox | Replacement player |

=== Women's side ===
- **Bold** denotes players with international caps.

| S/N | Name | Nat. | Date of birth (age) | Batting style | Bowling style | Notes |
Batters
| 63 | Sophie Luff | (England) | 6 December 1993 (age 32) | Right-handed | Right-arm medium | Captain |
All-rounders
| 44 | Alice Macleod | (England) | 14 May 1994 (age 31) | Right-handed | Right-arm off break | |
| 50 | **Hayley Matthews** | (Cricket West Indies) | 19 March 1998 (age 27) | Right-handed | Right-arm off break | Overseas player |
| 64 | Georgia Hennessy | (England) | 4 November 1996 (age 29) | Right-handed | Right-arm medium | |
Wicketkeepers
| 7 | Nat Wraith | (England) | 3 October 2001 (age 24) | Right-handed | — | |
| 8 | Georgia Redmayne | (Australia) | 8 December 1993 (age 32) | Left-handed | — | Overseas player |
| 30 | **Sarah Taylor** | (England) | 20 May 1989 (age 36) | Right-handed | — | |
Pace bowlers
| 17 | Piepa Cleary | (Australia) | 17 July 1996 (age 29) | Right-handed | Right-arm medium | Overseas player |
| 25 | Alex Griffiths | (Wales) | 12 June 2002 (age 23) | Right-handed | Right-arm medium | |
| 99 | **Katie George** | (England) | 7 April 1999 (age 26) | Left-handed | Left-arm medium | Centrally contracted |
| — | Lauren Filer | (England) | 22 December 2000 (age 25) | Right-handed | Right-arm medium | |
| — | Amy Gordon | (England) | 3 October 2001 (age 24) | Right-handed | Right-arm medium | |
Spin bowlers
| 2 | Nicole Harvey | (England) | 18 September 1992 (age 33) | Right-handed | Right-arm leg break | |
| 3 | Hannah Baker | (England) | 3 February 2004 (age 22) | Right-handed | Right-arm leg break | |
| 4 | **Bryony Smith** | (England) | 12 December 1997 (age 28) | Right-handed | Right-arm off break | |

== Fixtures (Men) ==
=== July ===
24 July 2021
18:00 (N)
Scorecard

| Welsh Fire; 173/4 (100 balls) | v | Northern Superchargers; 168/7 (100 balls) |
| Jonny Bairstow 56 (36); Ben Stokes 1/8 (10 balls) | | Harry Brook 62 (31); Qais Ahmad 4/13 (20 balls) |

Welsh Fire won by 5 runs
Headingley, Leeds
Attendance: 10,324
Umpires: Nigel Llong and Neil Mallender
Player of the match: Qais Ahmad (Welsh Fire)

- Northern Superchargers won the toss and elected to field.
- Points: Welsh Fire 2, Northern Superchargers 0.

27 July 2021
18:30 (N)
Scorecard

| Welsh Fire; 165/4 (100 balls) | v | Southern Brave; 147/7 (100 balls) |
| Jonny Bairstow 72 (39); Danny Briggs 2/33 (15 balls) | | James Vince 40 (27); James Neesham 3/5 (15 balls) |

Welsh Fire won by 18 runs
Sophia Gardens, Cardiff
Attendance: 3,021
Umpires: Rob Bailey and Nigel Llong
Player of the match: Jonny Bairstow (Welsh Fire)

- Southern Brave won the toss and elected to field.
- Points: Welsh Fire 2, Southern Brave 0.

31 July 2021
14:30
Scorecard

| Welsh Fire; 150/6 (100 balls) | v | Manchester Originals; 153/3 (95 balls) |
| Leus du Plooy 43 (22); Tom Hartley 2/11 (15 balls) | | Joe Clarke 58 (31); Ryan Higgins 1/9 (10 balls) |

Manchester Originals won by 7 wickets
Sophia Gardens, Cardiff
Umpires: Rob Bailey and Tim Robinson
Player of the match: Joe Clarke (Manchester Originals)

- Welsh Fire won the toss and elected to bat.
- Points: Manchester Originals 2, Welsh Fire 0.

=== August ===
2 August 2021
18:30 (N)
Scorecard

| Welsh Fire; 121/7 (100 balls) | v | Oval Invincibles; 125/4 (93 balls) |
| Ben Duckett 65 (52); Tom Curran 3/29 (20 balls) | | Sam Billings 40* (34); James Neesham 2/23 (20 balls) |

Oval Invincibles won by 6 wickets
The Oval, London
Attendance: 21,279
Umpires: Neil Mallender and Alex Wharf
Player of the match: Sam Billings (Oval Invincibles)

- Oval Invincibles won the toss and elected to field.
- Points: Oval Invincibles 2, Welsh Fire 0.

6 August 2021
19:00 (N)
Scorecard

| Welsh Fire; 139/8 (100 balls) | v | Trent Rockets; 140/4 (90 balls) |
| Glenn Phillips 50 (35); Wahab Riaz 4/30 (20 balls) | | Samit Patel 46* (20); Qais Ahmad 2/23 (20 balls) |

Trent Rockets won by 6 wickets
Sophia Gardens, Cardiff
Umpires: Rob Bailey and Martin Saggers
Player of the match: Samit Patel (Trent Rockets)

- Trent Rockets won the toss and elected to field.
- Points: Trent Rockets 2, Welsh Fire 0.

9 August 2021
18:30 (N)
Scorecard

| Birmingham Phoenix; 184/5 (100 balls) | v | Welsh Fire; 91 (74 balls) |
| Will Smeed 65* (38); David Payne 3/38 (20 balls) | | Ian Cockbain 32 (25); Imran Tahir 5/25 (19 balls) |

Birmingham Phoenix won by 93 runs
Edgbaston, Birmingham
Umpires: Steve O'Shaughnessy and Tim Robinson
Player of the match: Imran Tahir (Birmingham Phoenix)

- Welsh Fire won the toss and elected to field.
- Imran Tahir (Birmingham Phoenix) took a hat-trick.
- Points: Birmingham Phoenix 2, Welsh Fire 0.

11 August 2021
18:30 (N)
Scorecard

| Welsh Fire; 144/5 (100 balls) | v | Southern Brave; 147/2 (87 balls) |
| Tom Banton 36 (20); Danny Briggs 2/17 (20 balls) | | Quinton de Kock 57* (32); Luke Fletcher 1/24 (15 balls) |

Southern Brave won by 8 wickets
Rose Bowl, Southampton
Umpires: David Millns and Russell Warren
Player of the match: Quinton de Kock (Southern Brave)

- Southern Brave won the toss and elected to field.
- Points: Southern Brave 2, Welsh Fire 0.

18 August 2021
18:30 (N)
Scorecard

| London Spirit; 163/5 (100 balls) | v | Welsh Fire; 165/7 (98 balls) |
| Josh Inglis 72 (45); Ryan Higgins 3/21 (20 balls) | | Glenn Phillips 80 (35); Brad Wheal 3/30 (18 balls) |

Welsh Fire won by 3 wickets
Sophia Gardens, Cardiff
Attendance: 9,261
Umpires: Nick Cook and Nigel Llong
Player of the match: Glenn Phillips (Welsh Fire)

- Welsh Fire won the toss and elected to field.
- Points: Welsh Fire 2, London Spirit 0.

== Fixtures (Women) ==
=== July ===
24 July 2021
14:30
Scorecard

| Welsh Fire; 130/8 (100 balls) | v | Northern Superchargers; 131/4 (85 balls) |
| Hayley Matthews 30 (20); Linsey Smith 3/14 (20 balls) | | Jemimah Rodrigues 92* (43); Piepa Cleary 1/14 (15 balls) |

Northern Superchargers won by 6 wickets
Headingley, Leeds
Umpires: Anna Harris and Steve O'Shaughnessy
Player of the match: Jemimah Rodrigues (Northern Superchargers)

- Northern Superchargers won the toss and elected to field.
- Points: Northern Superchargers 2, Welsh Fire 0.

27 July 2021
15:00
Scorecard

| Welsh Fire; 110/7 (100 balls) | v | Southern Brave; 112/2 (84 balls) |
| Hayley Matthews 33 (20); Lauren Bell 2/19 (20 balls); Amanda-Jade Wellington 2/19 (20 balls) | | Smriti Mandhana 61* (39); Nicole Harvey 1/23 (15 balls) |

Southern Brave won by 8 wickets
Sophia Gardens, Cardiff
Umpires: Jasmine Naeem and Alex Wharf
Player of the match: Smriti Mandhana (Southern Brave)

- Southern Brave won the toss and elected to field.
- Points: Southern Brave 2, Welsh Fire 0.

31 July 2021
11:00
Scorecard

| Manchester Originals; 120/6 (100 balls) | v | Welsh Fire; 124/1 (88 balls) |
| Sophie Ecclestone 31* (15); Georgia Hennessy 2/24 (20 balls) | | Hayley Matthews 71* (50); Laura Jackson 1/27 (15 balls) |

Welsh Fire won by 9 wickets
Sophia Gardens, Cardiff
Umpires: Neil Mallender and Sue Redfern
Player of the match: Hayley Matthews (Welsh Fire)

- Welsh Fire won the toss and elected to field.
- Points: Welsh Fire 2, Manchester Originals 0.

=== August ===
2 August 2021
15:00
Scorecard

| Welsh Fire; 112/6 (100 balls) | v | Oval Invincibles; 100/9 (100 balls) |
| Georgia Redmayne 30 (29); Dane van Niekerk 1/10 (20 balls) | | Grace Gibbs 21 (22); Hayley Matthews 3/23 (20 balls) |

Welsh Fire won by 12 runs
The Oval, London
Umpires: Graham Lloyd and Sue Redfern
Player of the match: Sarah Taylor (Welsh Fire)

- Oval Invincibles won the toss and elected to field.
- Points: Welsh Fire 2, Oval Invincibles 0.

6 August 2021
15:30
Scorecard

| Welsh Fire; 102 (100 balls) | v | Trent Rockets; 103/6 (92 balls) |
| Hayley Matthews 28 (32); Heather Graham 3/14 (20 balls) | | Nat Sciver 54 (40); Hayley Matthews 2/13 (20 balls) |

Trent Rockets won by 4 wickets
Sophia Gardens, Cardiff
Umpires: Peter Hartley and Jasmine Naeem
Player of the match: Nat Sciver (Trent Rockets)

- Trent Rockets won the toss and elected to field.
- Points: Trent Rockets 2, Welsh Fire 0.

9 August 2021
15:00
Scorecard

| Welsh Fire; 127/9 (100 balls) | v | Birmingham Phoenix; 131/0 (76 balls) |
| Bryony Smith 38 (36); Kirstie Gordon 2/30 (20 balls) | | Shafali Verma 76* (42) |

Birmingham Phoenix won by 10 wickets
Edgbaston, Birmingham
Umpires: Sarah Bartlett and Russell Warren
Player of the match: Shafali Verma (Birmingham Phoenix)

- Birmingham Phoenix won the toss and elected to field.
- Points: Birmingham Phoenix 2, Welsh Fire 0.

11 August 2021
15:00
Scorecard

| Southern Brave; 166/3 (100 balls) | v | Welsh Fire; 127/4 (100 balls) |
| Smriti Mandhana 78 (52); Hayley Matthews 2/27 (20 balls) | | Georgia Redmayne 35* (27); Danni Wyatt 1/10 (5 balls) |

Southern Brave won by 39 runs
Rose Bowl, Southampton
Umpires: Graham Lloyd and Jasmine Naeem
Player of the match: Smriti Mandhana (Southern Brave)

- Welsh Fire won the toss and elected to field.
- Points: Southern Brave 2, Welsh Fire 0.

18 August 2021
15:00
Scorecard

| Welsh Fire; 95/9 (100 balls) | v | London Spirit; 96/3 (58 balls) |
| Georgia Redmayne 35 (28); Danielle Gibson 2/10 (15 balls) | | Heather Knight 34* (19); Danielle Gibson 34* (19); Hayley Matthews 2/28 (18 balls) |

London Spirit won by 7 wickets
Sophia Gardens, Cardiff
Umpires: Sarah Bartlett and David Millns
Player of the match: Danielle Gibson (London Spirit)

- London Spirit won the toss and elected to field.
- Points: London Spirit 2, Welsh Fire 0.

== Standings ==
=== Women ===
| Pos | Team | Pld | W | L | T | NR | Pts | NRR |
|---|---|---|---|---|---|---|---|---|
| 1 | Southern Brave | 8 | 7 | 1 | 0 | 0 | 14 | 1.056 |
| 2 | Oval Invincibles | 8 | 4 | 3 | 0 | 1 | 9 | 0.015 |
| 3 | Birmingham Phoenix | 8 | 4 | 4 | 0 | 0 | 8 | 0.186 |
| 4 | London Spirit | 8 | 4 | 4 | 0 | 0 | 8 | 0.046 |
| 5 | Manchester Originals | 8 | 3 | 4 | 0 | 1 | 7 | 0.016 |
| 6 | Northern Superchargers | 8 | 3 | 4 | 0 | 1 | 7 | −0.041 |
| 7 | Trent Rockets | 8 | 3 | 4 | 0 | 1 | 7 | −0.293 |
| 8 | Welsh Fire | 8 | 2 | 6 | 0 | 0 | 4 | −1.017 |

Source: ESPN Cricinfo, Sky Sports

advances to the Final
advances to the Eliminator

=== Men ===
| Pos | Team | Pld | W | L | T | NR | Pts | NRR |
|---|---|---|---|---|---|---|---|---|
| 1 | Birmingham Phoenix | 8 | 6 | 2 | 0 | 0 | 12 | 1.087 |
| 2 | Southern Brave | 8 | 5 | 2 | 0 | 1 | 11 | 0.034 |
| 3 | Trent Rockets | 8 | 5 | 3 | 0 | 0 | 10 | 0.035 |
| 4 | Oval Invincibles | 8 | 4 | 3 | 0 | 1 | 9 | 0.123 |
| 5 | Northern Superchargers | 8 | 3 | 4 | 0 | 1 | 7 | 0.510 |
| 6 | Manchester Originals | 8 | 2 | 4 | 0 | 2 | 6 | −0.361 |
| 7 | Welsh Fire | 8 | 3 | 5 | 0 | 0 | 6 | −0.827 |
| 8 | London Spirit | 8 | 1 | 6 | 0 | 1 | 3 | −0.641 |

Source: ESPN Cricinfo, Sky Sports

advances to the Final
advances to the Eliminator
