= 2022 Welsh Fire season =

Season of the 100-ball cricket tournament

Welsh Fire
2022 season
- Coach: (South Africa) Gary Kirsten (men's team) (Cricket West Indies) Gareth Breese (women's team)
- Captain: (England) Josh Cobb (men's team) (England) Tammy Beaumont (women's team)
- Overseas player: (South Africa) David Miller (Pakistan) Naseem Shah (Afghanistan) Noor Ahmad (South Africa) Dwaine Pretorius (New Zealand) Ish Sodhi (Australia) Adam Zampa (men's team) (Australia) Nicola Carey (New Zealand) Maddy Green (Australia) Rachael Haynes (Cricket West Indies) Hayley Matthews (Australia) Annabel Sutherland (women's team)
- Ground(s): Sophia Gardens
- The Hundred (Men's): 8th
- The Hundred (Women's): 8th
- Most runs: Ben Duckett: 220 (Men's team); Tammy Beaumont: 138 (Women's team)
- Most wickets: Jake Ball: 8 (Men's team); Claire Nicholas: 6 (Women's team)

The 2022 season was the Welsh Fire's second season of the 100 ball franchise cricket, The Hundred. The franchise struggled during the competition, with both the men's and women's teams finishing bottom of their groups.

== Players ==
=== Men's side ===
- **Bold** denotes players with international caps.

S/N	Name	Nat.	Date of birth (age)	Batting style	Bowling style	Notes
Batters
2	Jacob Bethell	(England)	23 October 2003 (age 22)	Left-handed	Slow left-arm orthodox	
10	**David Miller**	(South Africa)	10 June 1989 (age 36)	Left-handed	Right-arm off break	Overseas player
16	Sam Hain	(England)	16 July 1995 (age 30)	Right-handed	Right-arm off break	
17	**Ben Duckett**	(England)	17 October 1994 (age 31)	Left-handed	—	
32	**Ollie Pope**	(England)	2 January 1998 (age 27)	Right-handed	—	Centrally Contracted player
76	Leus du Plooy	(South Africa)	12 January 1995 (age 30)	Left-handed	Slow left-arm orthodox	EU passport
All-rounders
4	Josh Cobb	(England)	17 August 1990 (age 35)	Right-handed	Right-arm off break	Captain
5	**Dwaine Pretorius**	(South Africa)	29 March 1989 (age 36)	Right-handed	Right-arm fast-medium	Overseas player; Replacement player
20	Matt Critchley	(England)	13 August 1996 (age 29)	Right-handed	Right-arm leg break	
29	Ryan Higgins	(England)	6 January 1995 (age 30)	Right-handed	Right-arm fast-medium	
Wicketkeepers
18	**Tom Banton**	(England)	11 November 1998 (age 27)	Right-handed	—	
33	Joe Clarke	(England)	26 May 1996 (age 29)	Right-handed	—	
51	**Jonny Bairstow**	(England)	26 September 1989 (age 36)	Right-handed	—	Centrally Contracted player; Ruled out
Pace bowlers
7	**David Payne**	(England)	15 February 1991 (age 34)	Right-handed	Left-arm fast-medium	
9	George Scrimshaw	(England)	10 February 1998 (age 27)	Right-handed	Right-arm fast	Wildcard player
14	**Jake Ball**	(England)	14 March 1991 (age 34)	Right-handed	Right-arm fast-medium	
—	**Naseem Shah**	(Pakistan)	15 February 2003 (age 22)	Right-handed	Right-arm fast	Overseas player; Ruled out
Spin bowlers
15	**Noor Ahmad**	(Afghanistan)	3 January 2005 (age 20)	Right-handed	Slow left-arm unorthodox	Overseas player
61	**Ish Sodhi**	(New Zealand)	31 October 1992 (age 33)	Right-handed	Right-arm leg break	Overseas player; Replacement player
88	**Adam Zampa**	(Australia)	31 March 1992 (age 33)	Right-handed	Right-arm leg break	Overseas player; Ruled out

==== Women's side ====
- **Bold** denotes players with international caps.

S/N	Name	Nat.	Date of birth (age)	Batting style	Bowling style	Notes
Batters
5	**Maddy Green**	(New Zealand)	20 October 1992 (age 33)	Right-handed	Right-arm off break	Overseas player; Replacement player
7	**Rachael Haynes**	(Australia)	26 December 1986 (age 38)	Left-handed	Left-arm medium	Overseas player
35	**Fran Wilson**	(England)	7 November 1991 (age 34)	Right-handed	Right-arm off break	
All-rounders
14	**Annabel Sutherland**	(Australia)	12 October 2001 (age 24)	Right-handed	Right-arm fast-medium	Overseas player
25	Alex Griffiths	(Wales)	12 June 2002 (age 23)	Right-handed	Right-arm medium	
31	Fi Morris	(England)	31 January 1994 (age 31)	Right-handed	Right-arm off break	
50	**Hayley Matthews**	(Cricket West Indies)	19 March 1998 (age 27)	Right-handed	Right-arm off break	Overseas player; Ruled out
Wicketkeepers
6	**Sarah Bryce**	(Scotland)	8 January 2000 (age 25)	Right-handed	—	
12	**Tammy Beaumont**	(England)	11 March 1991 (age 34)	Right-handed	—	Captain
Pace bowlers
16	**Nicola Carey**	(Australia)	10 September 1993 (age 32)	Left-handed	Right-arm medium	Overseas player
24	Lauren Filer	(England)	22 December 2000 (age 24)	Right-handed	Right-arm medium	
99	**Katie George**	(England)	7 April 1999 (age 26)	Left-handed	Left-arm medium	
Spin bowlers
2	Nicole Harvey	(England)	18 September 1992 (age 33)	Right-handed	Right-arm leg break	
3	Hannah Baker	(England)	3 February 2004 (age 21)	Right-handed	Right-arm leg break	
8	Claire Nicholas	(Wales)	8 September 1986 (age 39)	Right-handed	Right-arm off break	
65	**Alex Hartley**	(England)	6 September 1993 (age 32)	Right-handed	Slow left-arm orthodox	

== Regular season ==
=== Fixtures (Men) ===
3 August 2022
19:00 (N)
Scorecard

Welsh Fire; 107/7 (100 balls)	v	Southern Brave (H); 109/1 (69 balls)
Ben Duckett 40 (31); Chris Jordan 2/16 (15 balls)		James Vince 71* (41); Jake Ball 1/25 (19 balls)

Southern Brave won by 9 wickets
Rose Bowl, Southampton
Umpires: Russell Warren (Eng) and Alex Wharf (Eng)
Player of the match: James Vince (Southern Brave)

- Southern Brave won the toss and elected to field.
- Points: Southern Brave 2, Welsh Fire 0.

7 August 2022
14:00
Scorecard

Oval Invincibles; 158/5 (100 balls)	v	Welsh Fire (H); 119/6 (100 balls)
Will Jacks 81 (45); Ryan Higgins 2/31 (20 balls)		Joe Clarke 37 (29); Sunil Narine 3/21 (20 balls)

Oval Invincibles won by 39 runs
Sophia Gardens, Cardiff
Umpires: Nigel Llong (Eng) and Alex Wharf (Eng)
Player of the match: Will Jacks (Oval Invincibles)

- Welsh Fire won the toss and elected to field.
- Points: Oval Invincibles 2, Welsh Fire 0.

13 August 2022
18:00 (N)
Scorecard

Birmingham Phoenix; 130/7 (100 balls)	v	Welsh Fire (H); 126/5 (100 balls)
Matthew Wade 38 (30); David Payne 2/12 (15 balls)		Tom Banton 44 (32); Kane Richardson 2/15 (20 balls)

Birmingham Phoenix won by 4 runs
Sophia Gardens, Cardiff
Umpires: Peter Hartley (Eng) and Russell Warren (Eng)
Player of the match: Kane Richardson (Birmingham Phoenix)

- Welsh Fire won the toss and elected to field.
- Points: Birmingham Phoenix 2, Welsh Fire 0.

16 August 2022
18:30 (N)
Scorecard

(H) Manchester Originals; 149/9 (100 balls)	v	Welsh Fire; 102 (89 balls)
Phil Salt 38 (22); Jake Ball 4/29 (20 balls)		Dwaine Pretorius 29 (14); Sean Abbott 4/8 (15 balls)

Manchester Originals won by 47 runs
Old Trafford, Manchester
Umpires: David Millns (Eng) and Neil Pratt (Eng)
Player of the match: Sean Abbott (Manchester Originals)

- Welsh Fire won the toss and elected to field.
- Points: Manchester Originals 2, Welsh Fire 0.

22 August 2022
18:30 (N)
Scorecard

(H) Welsh Fire; 129/8 (100 balls)	v	Southern Brave; 132/1 (82 balls)
Leus du Plooy 37 (25); George Garton 3/7 (15 balls)		Paul Stirling 74* (42); Dwaine Pretorius 1/20 (20 balls)

Southern Brave won by 9 wickets
Sophia Gardens, Cardiff
Umpires: Ben Debenham (Eng) and Graham Lloyd (Eng)
Player of the match: George Garton (Southern Brave)

- Southern Brave won the toss and elected to field.
- Sonny Baker (Southern Brave) made his T20 debut.
- Points: Southern Brave 2, Welsh Fire 0.

24 August 2022
18:30 (N)
Scorecard

(H) London Spirit; 156/6 (100 balls)	v	Welsh Fire; 139/9 (100 balls)
Dan Lawrence 43 (26); Ish Sodhi 2/19 (20 balls)		Ben Duckett 34 (19); Dan Lawrence 4/20 (20 balls)

London Spirit won by 17 runs
Lord's, London
Umpires: Hassan Adnan (Eng) and Richard Kettleborough (Eng)
Player of the match: Dan Lawrence (London Spirit)

- Welsh Fire won the toss and elected to field.
- Points: London Spirit 2, Welsh Fire 0.

26 August 2022
19:00 (N)
Scorecard

(H) Welsh Fire; 114/4 (100 balls)	v	Northern Superchargers; 116/4 (91 balls)
Ben Duckett 64* (48); Craig Miles 2/30 (20 balls)		Adam Lyth 47 (34); Ish Sodhi 2/14 (20 balls)

Northern Superchargers won by 6 wickets
Sophia Gardens, Cardiff
Umpires: Richard Kettleborough (Eng) and Tom Lungley (Eng)
Player of the match: Adam Lyth (Northern Superchargers)

- Welsh Fire won the toss and elected to bat.
- Points: Northern Superchargers 2, Welsh Fire 0.

29 August 2022
19:00 (N)
Scorecard

(H) Trent Rockets; 172/4 (100 balls)	v	Welsh Fire; 143/6 (100 balls)
Dawid Malan 58 (37); Jake Ball 1/25 (20 balls)		Matt Critchley 55* (35); Tabraiz Shamsi 2/12 (20 balls)

Trent Rockets won by 29 runs
Trent Bridge, Nottingham
Umpires: Ian Blackwell (Eng) and Graham Lloyd (Eng)
Player of the match: Dawid Malan (Trent Rockets)

- Welsh Fire won the toss and elected to field.
- Points: Trent Rockets 2, Welsh Fire 0.

== Fixtures (Women) ==
Due to the shortened women's competition, Trent Rockets didn't play against Oval Invincibles.

.

13 August 2022
14:30
Scorecard

Birmingham Phoenix; 161/5 (100 balls)	v	Welsh Fire (H); 142/5 (100 overs)
Ellyse Perry 58 (31); Claire Nicholas 2/26 (20 balls)		Tammy Beaumont 39 (34); Georgia Elwiss 2/29 (20 balls)

Birmingham Phoenix won by 19 runs
Sophia Gardens, Cardiff
Umpires: Ian Blackwell (Eng) and Claire Polosak (Aus)
Player of the match: Ellyse Perry (Birmingham Phoenix)

- Welsh Fire won the toss and elected to field.
- Points: Birmingham Phoenix 2, Welsh Fire 0.

16 August 2022
15:00
Scorecard

(H) Manchester Originals; 156/2 (100 balls)	v	Welsh Fire; 145/3 (100 balls)
Deandra Dottin 67* (37); Alex Hartley 1/17 (20 balls)		Hayley Matthews 69 (41); Deandra Dottin 2/21 (15 balls)

Manchester Originals won by 11 runs
Old Trafford, Manchester
Umpires: Jasmine Naeem (Eng) and Mark Newell (Eng)
Player of the match: Deandra Dottin (Manchester Originals)

- Welsh Fire won the toss and elected to field.
- Points: Manchester Originals 2, Welsh Fire 0.

22 August 2022
15:00
Scorecard

Southern Brave; 122/8 (100 balls)	v	Welsh Fire (H); 108 (99 balls)
Sophia Dunkley 49 (43); Hayley Matthews 2/26 (20 balls)		Sarah Bryce 28 (21); Anya Shrubsole 3/20 (19 balls)

Southern Brave won by 14 runs
Sophia Gardens, Cardiff
Umpires: Jasmine Naeem (Eng) and Mark Newell (Eng)
Player of the match: Sophia Dunkley (Southern Brave)

- Welsh Fire won the toss and elected to field.
- Points: Southern Brave 2, Welsh Fire 0.

24 August 2022
15:00
Scorecard

Welsh Fire; 119/9 (100 balls)	v	London Spirit (H); 122/2 (86 balls)
Sarah Bryce 33 (25); Freya Davies 3/25 (20 balls)		Beth Mooney 61* (39); Claire Nicholas 1/18 (15 balls)

London Spirit won by 8 wickets
Lord's, London
Umpires: Anna Harris (Eng) and Billy Taylor (Eng)
Player of the match: Beth Mooney (London Spirit)

- Welsh Fire won the toss and elected to bat.
- Points: London Spirit 2, Welsh Fire 0.

26 August 2022
15:30
Scorecard

(H) Welsh Fire; 123/6 (100 balls)	v	Northern Superchargers; 112/6 (100 balls)
Sarah Bryce 36 (30); Jenny Gunn 2/20 (15 balls)		Laura Wolvaardt 41 (38); Nicola Carey 3/18 (20 balls)

Welsh Fire won by 11 runs
Sophia Gardens, Cardiff
Umpires: Neil Bainton (Eng) and Jasmine Naeem (Eng)
Player of the match: Nicola Carey (Welsh Fire)

- Welsh Fire won the toss and elected to bat.
- Points: Welsh Fire 2, Northern Superchargers 0.

29 August 2022
15:30
Scorecard

Welsh Fire; 100/8 (100 balls)	v	Trent Rockets (H); 102/2 (82 balls)
Nicola Carey 27 (29); Bryony Smith 2/14 (15 balls)		Elyse Villani 55* (40); Lauren Filer 1/13 (20 balls)

Trent Rockets won by 8 wickets
Trent Bridge, Nottingham
Umpires: Neil Bainton (Eng) and Sue Redfern (Eng)
Player of the match: Elyse Villani (Trent Rockets)

- Welsh Fire won the toss and elected to bat.
- Points: Trent Rockets 2, Welsh Fire 0.

== Standings ==
=== Women ===
Pos	Team	Pld	W	L	T	NR	Pts	NRR
1	Oval Invincibles	6	5	1	0	0	10	1.098
2	Southern Brave	6	5	1	0	0	10	0.806
3	Trent Rockets	6	3	3	0	0	6	0.101
4	Birmingham Phoenix	6	3	3	0	0	6	−0.031
5	Northern Superchargers	6	3	3	0	0	6	−0.119
6	Manchester Originals	6	2	4	0	0	4	−0.478
7	London Spirit	6	2	4	0	0	4	−0.557
8	Welsh Fire	6	1	5	0	0	2	−0.681

Source: BBC Sport, ESPN Cricinfo

advances to Final
advances to the Eliminator

=== Men ===
Pos	Team	Pld	W	L	T	NR	Pts	NRR
1	Trent Rockets	8	6	2	0	0	12	0.576
2	Manchester Originals	8	5	3	0	0	10	0.908
3	London Spirit	8	5	3	0	0	10	0.338
4	Birmingham Phoenix	8	5	3	0	0	10	−0.172
5	Oval Invincibles	8	4	4	0	0	8	0.385
6	Northern Superchargers	8	4	4	0	0	8	0.009
7	Southern Brave	8	3	5	0	0	6	−0.593
8	Welsh Fire	8	0	8	0	0	0	−1.442

Source: BBC Sport, ESPN Cricinfo

advances to Final
advances to the Eliminator
