= 2019 Western Storm season =

English cricket season

Western Storm
2019 season
- Coach: Trevor Griffin
- Captain: Heather Knight
- Overseas player: Smriti Mandhana; Rachel Priest; Deepti Sharma
- WCSL: Champions
- Most runs: Heather Knight (392)
- Most wickets: Freya Davies (19)
- Most catches: Fran Wilson (6)
- Most wicket-keeping dismissals: Rachel Priest (12)

The 2019 season was Western Storm's fourth season, in which they competed in the final edition of the Women's Cricket Super League, a Twenty20 competition. The side finished top of the initial group stage, winning 9 of their 10 matches, therefore progressing straight to the final. In the final they played against Southern Vipers, beating them by seven wickets to claim their second Super League title.

The side was captained by Heather Knight and coached by Trevor Griffin. They played three home matches at the County Ground, Taunton and two at the County Ground, Bristol.

== Squad ==
Western Storm announced their full 15-player squad for the season on 5 July 2019. Age given is at the start of Western Storm's first match of the season (6 August 2019).

| Name | Nationality | Birth date | Batting Style | Bowling Style | Notes |
Batters
| Sophie Luff | England | 6 December 1993 (aged 25) | Right-handed | Right-arm medium | |
| Smriti Mandhana | India | 18 July 1996 (aged 23) | Left-handed | Right-arm medium | Overseas player |
| Fran Wilson | England | 7 November 1991 (aged 27) | Right-handed | Right arm off break | |
All-rounders
| Naomi Dattani | England | 28 April 1994 (aged 25) | Left-handed | Left-arm medium | |
| Heather Knight | England | 26 December 1990 (aged 28) | Right-handed | Right-arm off break | Captain |
| Deepti Sharma | India | 24 August 1997 (aged 21) | Left-handed | Right-arm off break | Overseas player |
Wicket-keepers
| Amara Carr | England | 17 April 1994 (aged 25) | Right-handed | — | |
| Rachel Priest | New Zealand | 13 June 1985 (aged 34) | Right-handed | — | Overseas player |
| Nat Wraith | England | 3 October 2001 (aged 17) | Right-handed | — | |
Bowlers
| Freya Davies | England | 27 October 1995 (aged 23) | Right-handed | Right-arm medium | |
| Danielle Gibson | England | 30 April 2001 (aged 18) | Right-handed | Right-arm medium | |
| Alex Griffiths | Wales | 12 June 2002 (aged 17) | Right-handed | Right-arm medium | |
| Ellie Mitchell | England | 28 December 2001 (aged 17) | Right-handed | Right-arm leg break | |
| Claire Nicholas | Wales | 8 September 1986 (aged 32) | Right-handed | Right-arm off break | |
| Sonia Odedra | England | 3 June 1988 (aged 31) | Right-handed | Right-arm medium | |
| Anya Shrubsole | England | 7 December 1991 (aged 27) | Right-handed | Right-arm medium | |

== Women's Cricket Super League ==
=== Season standings ===
| Pos | Team | Pld | W | L | T | NR | BP | Pts | NRR |
|---|---|---|---|---|---|---|---|---|---|
| 1 | Western Storm | 10 | 9 | 1 | 0 | 0 | 3 | 39 | 1.109 |
| 2 | Loughborough Lightning | 10 | 7 | 3 | 0 | 0 | 4 | 32 | 0.792 |
| 3 | Southern Vipers | 10 | 4 | 4 | 1 | 1 | 2 | 22 | 0.425 |
| 4 | Yorkshire Diamonds | 10 | 5 | 5 | 0 | 0 | 0 | 20 | −0.456 |
| 5 | Surrey Stars | 10 | 3 | 6 | 0 | 1 | 2 | 16 | −0.857 |
| 6 | Lancashire Thunder | 10 | 0 | 9 | 1 | 0 | 0 | 2 | −1.194 |

Source: ESPN Cricinfo

Advanced to the Final.
Advanced to the Semi-final.

=== League stage ===
6 August 2019
16:00
Scorecard

| Loughborough Lightning; 125/6 (20 overs) | v | Western Storm; 126/3 (17 overs) |
| Amy Jones 65 (53); Freya Davies 2/24 (4 overs) | | Heather Knight 41 (39); Sarah Glenn 2/13 (3 overs) |

Western Storm won by 7 wickets
Haslegrave Ground, Loughborough
Umpires: Mark Newell and Rob White
Player of the match: Heather Knight (Western Storm)

- Loughborough Lightning won the toss and elected to bat.
- Points: Western Storm 4, Loughborough Lightning 0.

10 August 2019
15:00
Scorecard

| Lancashire Thunder; 141/6 (20 overs) | v | Western Storm; 143/4 (19.3 overs) |
| Suné Luus 62 (48); Claire Nicholas 2/25 (4 overs) | | Fran Wilson 54 (35); Sophie Ecclestone 1/19 (4 overs) |

Western Storm won by 6 wickets
County Ground, Taunton
Umpires: Jeff Evans and Alex Wharf
Player of the match: Fran Wilson (Western Storm)

- Lancashire Thunder won the toss and elected to bat.
- Points: Western Storm 4, Lancashire Thunder 0.

11 August 2019
14:30
Scorecard

| Southern Vipers; 142/5 (20 overs) | v | Western Storm; 143/7 (19.5 overs) |
| Stafanie Taylor 44* (28); Claire Nicholas 2/29 (4 overs) | | Fran Wilson 40 (30); Natasha Farrant 3/23 (4 overs) |

Western Storm won by 3 wickets
Rose Bowl, Southampton
Umpires: James Middlebrook and Chris Watts
Player of the match: Fran Wilson (Western Storm)

- Southern Vipers won the toss and elected to bat.
- Points: Western Storm 4, Southern Vipers 0.

13 August 2019
14:30
Scorecard

| Western Storm; 158/4 (20 overs) | v | Loughborough Lightning; 118 (18.2 overs) |
| Rachel Priest 55 (43); Georgia Elwiss 1/21 (3 overs) | | Mignon du Preez 30 (24); Freya Davies 4/27 (4 overs) |

Western Storm won by 40 runs
County Ground, Bristol
Umpires: Martin Saggers and David Millns
Player of the match: Freya Davies (Western Storm)

- Loughborough Lightning won the toss and elected to field.
- Points: Western Storm 5, Loughborough Lightning 0.

15 August 2019
14:30
Scorecard

| Yorkshire Diamonds; 151/9 (20 overs) | v | Western Storm; 152/1 (14.5 overs) |
| Hollie Armitage 59 (56); Anya Shrubsole 1/16 (4 overs) | | Rachel Priest 72* (43); Alice Davidson-Richards 1/27 (3 overs) |

Western Storm won by 9 wickets
Clifton Park Ground, York
Umpires: Tom Lungley and Sue Redfern
Player of the match: Rachel Priest (Western Storm)

- Western Storm won the toss and elected to field.
- Points: Western Storm 5, Yorkshire Diamonds 0.

18 August 2019
14:30
Scorecard

| Lancashire Thunder; 159/8 (20 overs) | v | Western Storm; 160/5 (19.5 overs) |
| Harmanpreet Kaur 50 (37); Anya Shrubsole 3/36 (4 overs) | | Smriti Mandhana 72 (43); Sophie Ecclestone 2/32 (4 overs) |

Western Storm won by 5 wickets
Chester Boughton Hall CC, Chester
Umpires: Hassan Adnan and Sue Redfern
Player of the match: Smriti Mandhana (Western Storm)

- Lancashire Thunder won the toss and elected to bat.
- Points: Western Storm 4, Lancashire Thunder 0.

20 August 2019
14:30
Scorecard

| Western Storm; 170/3 (20 overs) | v | Southern Vipers; 155/9 (20 overs) |
| Heather Knight 61 (48); Stafanie Taylor 1/20 (4 overs) | | Danni Wyatt 56 (32); Freya Davies 4/18 (4 overs) |

Western Storm won by 15 runs
County Ground, Bristol
Umpires: Ian Ramage and Sue Redfern
Player of the match: Freya Davies (Western Storm)

- Western Storm won the toss and elected to bat.
- Points: Western Storm 4, Southern Vipers 0.

21 August 2019
15:00
Scorecard

| Western Storm; 159/8 (20 overs) | v | Surrey Stars; 155/8 (20 overs) |
| Rachel Priest 44 (16); Marizanne Kapp 1/8 (3 overs) | | Sarah Taylor 73 (54); Deepti Sharma 3/18 (4 overs) |

Western Storm won by 4 runs
County Ground, Taunton
Umpires: Neil Pratt and Ian Ramage
Player of the match: Sarah Taylor (Surrey Stars)

- Surrey Stars won the toss and elected to field.
- Points: Western Storm 4, Surrey Stars 0

25 August 2019
14:30
Scorecard

| Western Storm; 171/4 (20 overs) | v | Surrey Stars; 94 (17.5 overs) |
| Rachel Priest 89 (55); Dane van Niekerk 2/34 (4 overs) | | Sarah Taylor 34 (29); Sonia Odedra 4/25 (3 overs) |

Western Storm won by 77 runs
Woodbridge Road, Guildford
Umpires: Tom Lungley and Sue Redfern
Player of the match: Rachel Priest (Western Storm)

- Surrey Stars won the toss and elected to field.
- Points: Western Storm 5, Surrey Stars 0

28 August 2019
18:30
Scorecard

| Yorkshire Diamonds; 104/4 (10 overs) | v | Western Storm; 99/3 (10 overs) |
| Jemimah Rodrigues 60 (27); Freya Davies 3/7 (2 overs) | | Fran Wilson 45 (20); Linsey Smith 1/14 (2 overs) |

Yorkshire Diamonds won by 5 runs
County Ground, Taunton, Taunton
Umpires: Mark Newell and Tom Lungley
Player of the match: Jemimah Rodrigues (Yorkshire Diamonds)

- Western Storm won the toss and elected to field.
- Match reduced to 10 overs per side due to rain.
- Points: Yorkshire Diamonds 4, Western Storm 0

=== Final ===
1 September 2019
16:00
Scorecard

| Southern Vipers; 172/7 (20 overs) | v | Western Storm; 174/4 (19 overs) |
| Danni Wyatt 73 (42); Anya Shrubsole 2/26 (4 overs) | | Heather Knight 78* (53); Amanda-Jade Wellington 2/31 (4 overs) |

Western Storm won by 6 wickets
County Ground, Hove
Umpires: Mark Newell and Rob White
Player of the match: Heather Knight (Western Storm)

- Southern Vipers won the toss and elected to bat.

== Statistics ==
=== Batting ===
| Player | Matches | Innings | NO | Runs | HS | Average | Strike rate | 100s | 50s | 4s | 6s |
|---|---|---|---|---|---|---|---|---|---|---|---|
| Naomi Dattani | 11 | 3 | 3 | 9 | 5* | – | 75.00 | 0 | 0 | 0 | 0 |
| Freya Davies | 11 | 1 | 1 | 0 | 0* | – | – | 0 | 0 | 0 | 0 |
| Danielle Gibson | 1 | – | – | – | – | – | – | – | – | – | – |
| Alex Griffiths | 5 | 1 | 0 | 1 | 1 | 1.00 | 50.00 | 0 | 0 | 0 | 0 |
| Heather Knight | 11 | 11 | 3 | 392 | 78* | 49.00 | 111.36 | 0 | 4 | 37 | 9 |
| Sophie Luff | 11 | 10 | 4 | 134 | 34 | 22.33 | 130.09 | 0 | 0 | 12 | 0 |
| Smriti Mandhana | 11 | 11 | 0 | 268 | 72 | 24.36 | 137.43 | 0 | 2 | 42 | 3 |
| Claire Nicholas | 10 | – | – | – | – | – | – | – | – | – | – |
| Sonia Odedra | 7 | 1 | 1 | 1 | 1* | – | 100.00 | 0 | 0 | 0 | 0 |
| Rachel Priest | 11 | 11 | 1 | 365 | 89 | 35.50 | 145.41 | 0 | 3 | 45 | 15 |
| Deepti Sharma | 11 | 7 | 5 | 106 | 39* | 53.00 | 145.20 | 0 | 0 | 15 | 0 |
| Anya Shrubsole | 10 | 2 | 0 | 0 | 0 | 0.00 | 0.00 | 0 | 0 | 0 | 0 |
| Fran Wilson | 11 | 10 | 4 | 298 | 54 | 49.66 | 138.60 | 0 | 2 | 37 | 4 |
Source: ESPN Cricinfo

=== Bowling ===
| Player | Matches | Innings | Overs | Maidens | Runs | Wickets | BBI | Average | Economy | Strike rate |
|---|---|---|---|---|---|---|---|---|---|---|
| Naomi Dattani | 11 | 2 | 2.5 | 0 | 22 | 2 | 2/10 | 11.00 | 7.76 | 8.5 |
| Freya Davies | 11 | 11 | 39.0 | 1 | 251 | 19 | 4/18 | 13.21 | 6.43 | 13.21 |
| Danielle Gibson | 1 | 1 | 2.0 | 0 | 8 | 0 | – | – | 4.00 | – |
| Alex Griffiths | 5 | 5 | 6.0 | 0 | 52 | 1 | 1/15 | 52.00 | 8.66 | 36.0 |
| Heather Knight | 11 | 11 | 35.0 | 1 | 256 | 5 | 2/27 | 51.20 | 7.31 | 42.0 |
| Claire Nicholas | 10 | 10 | 35.0 | 1 | 246 | 12 | 2/25 | 20.50 | 7.02 | 17.5 |
| Sonia Odedra | 7 | 7 | 16.0 | 0 | 138 | 6 | 4/25 | 23.00 | 8.62 | 16.0 |
| Deepti Sharma | 11 | 11 | 38.2 | 0 | 254 | 9 | 3/18 | 28.22 | 6.62 | 25.5 |
| Anya Shrubsole | 10 | 10 | 32.0 | 0 | 254 | 13 | 3/36 | 19.53 | 7.93 | 14.7 |
Source: ESPN Cricinfo

=== Fielding ===
| Player | Matches | Innings | Catches |
|---|---|---|---|
| Naomi Dattani | 11 | 11 | 5 |
| Freya Davies | 11 | 11 | 0 |
| Danielle Gibson | 1 | 1 | 0 |
| Alex Griffiths | 5 | 5 | 4 |
| Heather Knight | 11 | 11 | 2 |
| Sophie Luff | 11 | 11 | 4 |
| Smriti Mandhana | 11 | 11 | 5 |
| Claire Nicholas | 10 | 10 | 3 |
| Sonia Odedra | 7 | 7 | 3 |
| Deepti Sharma | 11 | 11 | 3 |
| Anya Shrubsole | 10 | 10 | 3 |
| Fran Wilson | 11 | 11 | 6 |
Source: ESPN Cricinfo

=== Wicket-keeping ===
| Player | Matches | Innings | Catches | Stumpings |
|---|---|---|---|---|
| Rachel Priest | 11 | 11 | 7 | 5 |
Source: ESPN Cricinfo
