= 2024 Welsh Fire season =

Season of the 100-ball cricket tournament

Welsh Fire
2024 season
- Coach: Gareth Breese (women); Michael Hussey (men)
- Captain: Tammy Beaumont (women); Tom Abell (men)
- Overseas player: Shabnim Ismail; Jess Jonassen; Hayley Matthews; (women); Haris Rauf; Matt Henry; Glenn Phillips; Shaheen Afridi; (men)
- Ground(s): Sophia Gardens

The 2024 season was the Welsh Fire's fourth season of the 100 ball franchise cricket, The Hundred.

== Players ==
- **Bold** denotes players with international caps.

=== Women's side ===
No.	Name	Nationality	Date of birth (age)	Batting style	Bowling style	Notes
Batters
4	Emily Windsor	England	14 September 1997 (age 28)	Right-handed	Right-arm medium	
12	**Tammy Beaumont**	England	11 March 1991 (age 34)	Right-handed	—	Captain
13	Ella McCaughan	England	26 September 2002 (age 23)	Right-handed	Right-arm leg break	
47	**Sophia Dunkley**	England	16 July 1998 (age 27)	Right-handed	Right-arm leg break	
All-rounders
25	Alex Griffiths	Wales	12 June 2002 (age 23)	Right-handed	Right-arm medium	
34	**Georgia Elwiss**	England	31 May 1991 (age 34)	Right-handed	Right-arm medium	
50	**Hayley Matthews**	West Indies	19 March 1998 (age 27)	Right-handed	Right-arm off break	Overseas player
—	Phoebe Franklin	England	18 February 1998 (age 27)	Right-handed	Right-arm medium	
Wicket-keepers
6	**Sarah Bryce**	Scotland	8 January 2000 (age 25)	Right-handed	—	
Pace bowlers
61	**Freya Davies**	England	27 October 1995 (age 30)	Right-handed	Right-arm medium	
89	**Shabnim Ismail**	South Africa	5 October 1988 (age 37)	Left-handed	Right-arm fast-medium	Overseas player
—	Kate Coppack	England	30 August 1994 (age 31)	Right-handed	Right-arm medium	Wildcard player
Spin bowlers
8	Claire Nicholas	Wales	8 September 1986 (age 39)	Right-handed	Right-arm off break	
—	Georgia Davis	England	3 June 1999 (age 26)	Right-handed	Right-arm off break	Wildcard player
—	**Jess Jonassen**	Australia	5 November 1992 (age 33)	Left-handed	Slow left-arm orthodox	Overseas player

=== Men's side ===
No.	Name	Nationality	Date of birth (age)	Batting style	Bowling style	Notes
Batters
6	**Glenn Phillips**	New Zealand	6 December 1996 (age 29)	Right-handed	Right-arm off break	Overseas player
23	Stephen Eskinazi	England	28 March 1994 (age 31)	Right-handed	—	
—	Tom Kohler-Cadmore	England	19 August 1994 (age 31)	Right-handed	Right-arm off break	
All-rounders
3	Luke Wells	England	29 December 1990 (age 34)	Left-handed	Right-arm leg break	
15	**David Willey**	England	28 February 1990 (age 35)	Left-handed	Left-arm fast-medium	
28	Tom Abell	England	5 March 1994 (age 31)	Right-handed	Right-arm medium	Captain
52	**Roelof van der Merwe**	Netherlands (Note: Van der Merwe has also played international cricket for South Africa)	31 December 1984 (age 40)	Right-handed	Slow left-arm orthodox	
54	Ben Green	England	28 September 1997 (age 28)	Right-handed	Right-arm fast-medium	Wildcard player
Wicket-keepers
33	Joe Clarke	England	26 May 1996 (age 29)	Right-handed	—	
51	**Jonny Bairstow**	England	26 September 1989 (age 36)	Right-handed	—	Centrally contracted player
—	Chris Cooke	South Africa	30 May 1986 (age 39)	Right-handed	—	UK passport
Pace bowlers
7	**David Payne**	England	15 February 1991 (age 34)	Right-handed	Left-arm fast-medium	
10	**Shaheen Afridi**	Pakistan	6 April 2000 (age 25)	Left-handed	Right-arm fast	Overseas player; Withdrawn
14	**Jake Ball**	England	14 March 1991 (age 34)	Right-handed	Right-arm fast-medium	
24	**Matt Henry**	New Zealand	14 December 1991 (age 34)	Right-handed	Right-arm fast-medium	Overseas player; Replacement player
77	**Haris Rauf**	Pakistan	7 November 1993 (age 32)	Right-handed	Right-arm fast	Overseas player
Spin bowlers
—	**Mason Crane**	England	18 February 1997 (age 28)	Right-handed	Right-arm leg break	Wildcard player

== Fixtures (Women) ==
Due to the shortened women's competition, Trent Rockets didn't play against TBA.

.

== Standings ==
=== Women ===
Pos	Team	Pld	W	L	T	NR	Pts	NRR	Qualification
1	Welsh Fire	8	5	2	0	1	11	0.334	Advanced to the Final
2	Oval Invincibles	8	5	2	1	0	11	0.034	Advanced to the Eliminator
3	London Spirit	8	4	3	1	0	9	0.080	Advanced to the Eliminator
4	Northern Superchargers	8	3	3	1	1	8	0.942	
5	Trent Rockets	8	4	4	0	0	8	0.407	
6	Manchester Originals	8	3	4	0	1	7	−0.398	
7	Birmingham Phoenix	8	3	4	0	1	7	−0.742	
8	Southern Brave	8	1	6	1	0	3	−0.675	

Source: ESPNcricinfo

=== Men ===
Pos	Team	Pld	W	L	T	NR	Pts	NRR	Qualification
1	Oval Invincibles	8	6	2	0	0	12	0.893	Advanced to the Final
2	Birmingham Phoenix	8	6	2	0	0	12	0.402	Advanced to the Eliminator
3	Southern Brave	8	5	2	0	1	11	0.595	Advanced to the Eliminator
4	Northern Superchargers	8	5	2	0	1	11	−0.453	
5	Trent Rockets	8	4	4	0	0	8	0.348	
6	Welsh Fire	8	2	4	0	2	6	−0.215	
7	Manchester Originals	8	1	7	0	0	2	−0.886	
8	London Spirit	8	1	7	0	0	2	−0.975	

Source: ESPN Cricinfo
