= Ian Cockbain =

Ian Cockbain may refer to:

- Ian Cockbain (cricketer, born 1987) (born 1987), English (Gloucestershire) cricketer
- Ian Cockbain (cricketer, born 1958) (1958–2022), English cricketer, father of the above
