= Mark O'Leary (cricketer) =

Welsh cricket coach

Personal information
- Full name: Mark Daniel O'Leary
- Born: 19 June 1976 (age 50); Panteg, Gwent, Wales
- Role: Coach

Head coaching information
- Years: Team
- 2020–2021: Western Storm
- 2021: Welsh Fire Women
- Source: CricketArchive, 16 February 2022

Mark Daniel O'Leary (born 19 June 1976) is a Welsh cricket coach and former cricketer. He was head coach of Western Storm in 2020 and 2021, and coached the women's team of Welsh Fire in the 2021 season of The Hundred. He previously played cricket for Wales Minor Counties, as well as the second XIs of Glamorgan and Somerset. Prior to being appointed Western Storm's head coach, he worked for two decades at Cardiff Metropolitan University and Cardiff MCCU.

== Career ==
O'Leary played cricket for Wales Minor Counties between 1995 and 2000, appearing 5 times in the Minor Counties Championship, playing as a right-handed batter and right-arm leg break bowler. He also appeared for Glamorgan Second XI between 1995 and 1997, and Somerset Second XI in 2002. He played club cricket for Sudbrook Cricket Club in Sudbrook, Monmouthshire.

O'Leary has also undertaken various roles at Cardiff Metropolitan University and Cardiff MCCU, eventually becoming head coach of the cricket team and a lecturer at the university. During his time there, he worked with various players who would become professional cricketers, such as Jack Leach, Rory Burns, Alex Milton and Matt Hobden. In 2018, he was named Coach of the Year by the ECB, as a recognition of his contribution to the game over two decades.

In 2019, he was named as the bowling coach for Western Storm in the final season of the Women's Cricket Super League, which the side went on to win. Ahead of the following season, 2020, O'Leary was named as the head coach of Western Storm, leading them to second place in the South Group of the new Rachael Heyhoe Flint Trophy in his first season. In 2020, he was named assistant coach of Welsh Fire's women's side for the inaugural season of The Hundred. After the tournament was postponed for a year due to the COVID-19 pandemic, head coach Matthew Mott withdrew from the side, with O'Leary stepping up into the role in his place. The side finished bottom of the table in the 2021 season.

In February 2022, it was announced that O'Leary was stepping down from his role as head coach of Western Storm. He was replaced as head coach of Welsh Fire ahead of the 2022 season by Gareth Breese.

In March 2025, O'Leary was appointed as assistant coach at Glamorgan.
