= Ian Cockbain (cricketer, born 1958) =

English cricketer (1958–2022)

Personal information
- Born: 19 April 1958; Bootle, Lancashire, England
- Died: 2 September 2022 (aged 64)
- Batting: Right-handed
- Bowling: Slow left-arm orthodox
- Relatives: Ian Cockbain, Jr. (son)

Domestic team information
- Years: Team
- 1979–1983: Lancashire
- 1984–2001: Cheshire
- 1993–1997: Minor Counties

Career statistics
Competition	First-class	List A
Matches	47	59
Runs scored	1,483	887
Batting average	21.18	18.87
100s/50s	0/7	0/6
Top score	98	65*
Catches/stumpings	22/–	22/–
- Source: Cricinfo, 10 September 2011

Ian Cockbain (19 April 1958 – 2 September 2022) was an English cricketer. He was born in Bootle, Lancashire.

Cockbain, a right-handed batsman who bowled slow left arm orthodox, made his first-class début for Lancashire against Leicestershire towards the end of the 1979 County Championship. In his second match the following season against eventual champions Middlesex at Lord's Cricket Ground, he helped Lancashire secure a draw, scoring 69 runs. Cockbain played a further 45 first-class appearances for Lancashire, the last of which came against Glamorgan in the 1983 County Championship. In his 46 first-class matches, he scored 1,456 runs at an average of 21.10, with a high score of 98. This score, which was one of seven first-class fifties he made, came against Warwickshire in 1982. He made his List A debut against Middlesex in the 1980 John Player League. Cockbain went on to make 26 further appearances in that format for the county, the last of which came against Hampshire in the 1983 John Player Special League. In his 27 List A matches for the county, he scored 313 runs at an average of 16.47, with a high score of 53 not out. He left Lancashire at the end of the 1983 season.

He joined Cheshire for the 1984 season, making his début against Cumberland in the MCCA Knockout Trophy. He played Minor counties cricket for Cheshire from 1984 to 2001, making 146 Minor Counties Championship appearances and 47 MCCA Knockout Trophy appearances. He made his first List A appearance for Cheshire in the 1985 NatWest Trophy against Yorkshire. Cockbain made sixteen further List A appearances for the county, the last of which came against Cornwall in the second round of the 2002 Cheltenham & Gloucester Trophy which was played in 2001. He captained Cheshire from 1991 to 2001. In his seventeen List A matches for Cheshire, he scored 296 runs at an average of 17.41, with a high score of 65. While playing for Cheshire, he also made List A appearances for the Minor Counties, making his début for the team in the 1993 Benson & Hedges Cup against Durham. He made thirteen further List A appearances for the Minor Counties, the last of which came against Yorkshire in the 1997 Benson & Hedges Cup. In his fourteen appearances for the team, he scored 278 runs at an average of 25.27, with a high score of 65 not out.

For over thirty years, Cockbain played his club cricket at Bootle CC in the Liverpool Competition, before retiring at the end of the 2008 at the age of 50.

It was during the winter of 2012-2013 that a friend suggested to him that he came out of retirement and join his club Formby, where Cockbain then lived, with a view to captaining the side in 2014 and, with his vast experience, taking them from the First Division into the ECB Premier League for 2015, the year of the club's 150th anniversary. On the last day of the 2014 season, Formby were proclaimed champions, winning the division by twenty points and thus fulfilling the club's dream for 2015.

Cockbain's son, also called Ian, plays county cricket for Gloucestershire.

Cockbain was also a semi-professional footballer, making a handful of appearances for South Liverpool in the Northern Premier League in 1982–83, having been a regular scorer for the reserves.

Cockbain died on 2 September 2022, at the age of 64.
