= Luke Fletcher =

English cricketer (born 1988)

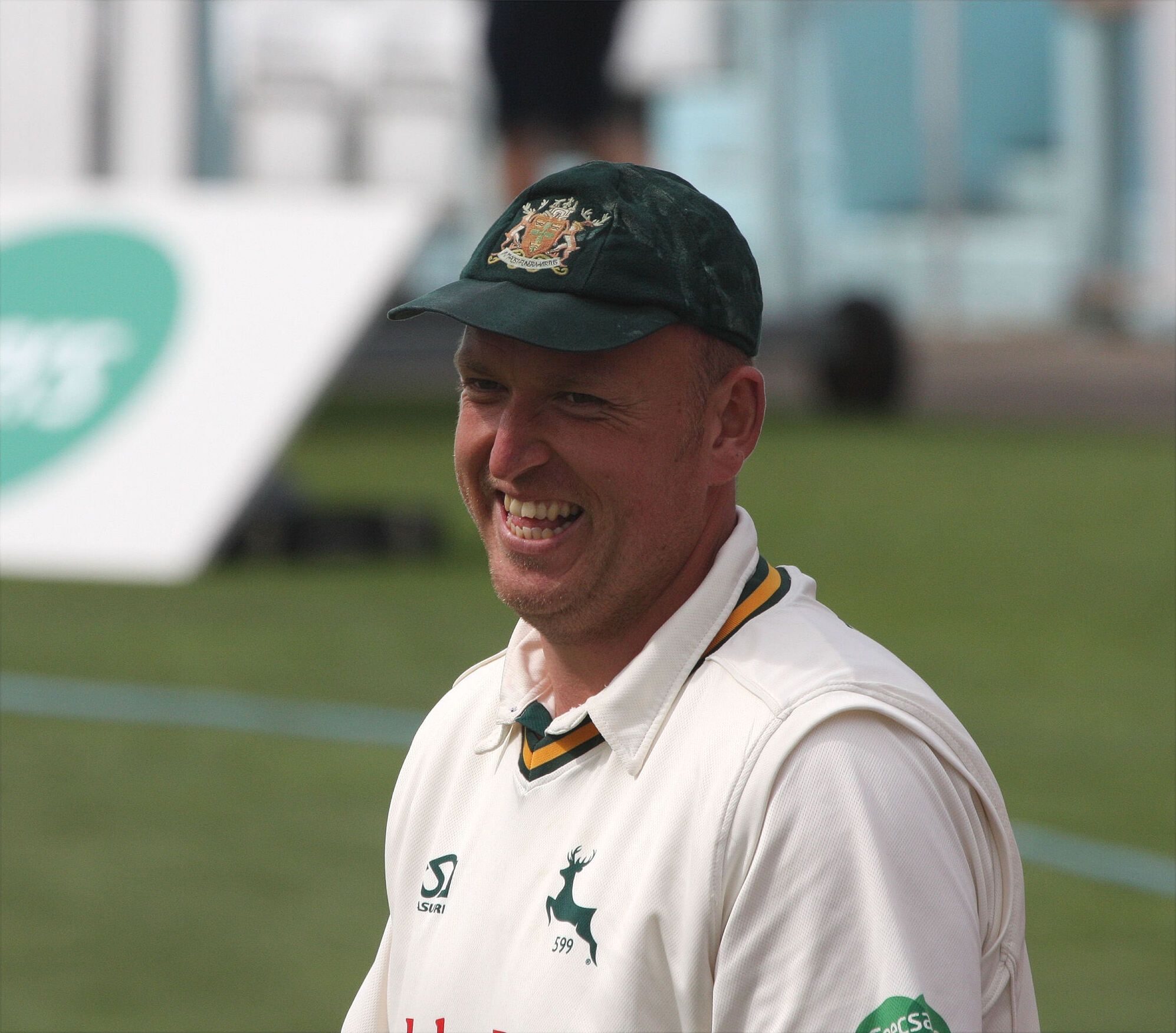
- Fletcher in 2019

Personal information
- Full name: Luke Jack Fletcher
- Born: 18 September 1988 (age 38); Nottingham, Nottinghamshire, England
- Height: 6 ft 6 in (1.98 m)
- Batting: Right-handed
- Bowling: Right-arm medium-fast

Domestic team information
- Years: Team
- 2008–2024: Nottinghamshire (squad no. 19)
- 2014/15: Wellington
- 2015: → Surrey (on loan)
- 2016: → Derbyshire (on loan)
- 2021: Welsh Fire
- 2022: Trent Rockets
- FC debut: 23 April 2008 Nottinghamshire v Oxford UCCE
- LA debut: 4 May 2008 Nottinghamshire v Northamptonshire

Career statistics
Competition	FC	LA	T20
Matches	150	85	109
Runs scored	2,370	513	185
Batting average	13.77	19.00	6.85
100s/50s	0/7	0/1	0/0
Top score	92	53*	27
Balls bowled	24,987	3,509	2,163
Wickets	456	93	120
Bowling average	26.23	35.26	25.46
5 wickets in innings	10	1	2
10 wickets in match	1	0	0
Best bowling	7/37	5/56	5/32
Catches/stumpings	31/–	13/–	12/–
- Source: ESPNcricinfo, 29 September 2024

Luke Jack Fletcher (born 18 September 1988) is a retired English cricketer who batted right-handed and bowled right-arm medium-fast. He played for Nottinghamshire from 2008 until 2024, with loan spells at Derbyshire and Surrey. In franchise cricket, he has played for Wellington Firebirds and Welsh Fire. Fletcher was voted the County Championship Player of the Year in 2021.

== Biography ==
Fletcher was born in Nottingham and was educated at the Henry Mellish School in the city. He played local cricket for Papplewick and Linby in the Nottinghamshire Premier League before signing for Nottinghamshire.

Fletcher made his first-class debut for Nottinghamshire against Oxford University in 2008. His County Championship debut came in 2009 against Lancashire. Since his debut, he has played 130 first-class matches, 123 for Nottinghamshire, four for Derbyshire, and three for Surrey. In his 130 first-class matches to date he has scored 2,169 runs at a batting average of 13.72, with fives half centuries and a high score of 92. With the ball he has taken 409 wickets at a bowling average of 26.00, with best figures of 7/37.

His List-A debut for the county also came in the 2008 season, against Northamptonshire in the 2008 Friends Provident Trophy. Since his debut, he has represented the county in 79 List-A matches. In his 79 List-A matches to date he has scored 505 runs at an average of 20.20, with a high score of 53*. With the ball he has taken 87 wickets at an average of 35.25, with best figures of 5/56.

During the 2009 season, he made his debut in Twenty20 cricket for Nottinghamshire, which came against Durham in the 2009 Twenty20 Cup. From 2009 to present, he has represented Nottinghamshire and Wellington Firebirds in 43 Twenty20 matches. In his 43 Twenty20 matches to date he has taken 58 wickets at an average of 22.68, with best figures of 4/30.

Fletcher played for Wellington Firebirds as a Twenty20 specialist in the inaugural Georgie Pie Super Smash during the 2014–15 season, but his spell in New Zealand was cut short due to injury.

In April 2016, Fletcher joined Derbyshire on a month's loan. He previously had a loan spell with Surrey during 2015.

In July 2017, Fletcher was hit in the head by a shot from Birmingham Bears batsman Sam Hain while bowling in a NatWest T20 Blast match. He was taken to hospital with concussion. Fletcher received stitches for the injury and missed the remainder of the season. He returned to training in November. The incident led to the ECB providing more funding for medical support at county level, including second-team matches.

In 2021 Fletcher took 66 wickets in the first class season, and was voted PCA most valuable player. When The Hundred launched in 2021, Fletcher was recruited as a replacement for the injured Jake Ball at Welsh Fire. In April 2022, he was bought by the Trent Rockets for the 2022 season of The Hundred.

On 16 September 2024, it was announced that Fletcher would leave Nottinghamshire at the end of the season after 17 years at the club.

In February 2025, Fletcher joined the coaching team at The Blaze.
