= Ian Cockbain (cricketer, born 1987) =

English cricketer

Personal information
- Full name: Ian Andrew Cockbain
- Born: 17 February 1987 (age 39); Liverpool, England
- Nickname: Coey, Mini
- Batting: Right-handed
- Bowling: Right-arm medium
- Relatives: Ian Cockbain, Sr. (father)

Domestic team information
- Years: Team
- 2011–2022: Gloucestershire (squad no. 28)
- 2021: Welsh Fire
- 2021/22: Adelaide Strikers (squad no. 3)
- 2022: Karachi Kings (squad no. 28)
- 2022: Trent Rockets
- FC debut: 8 April 2011 Gloucestershire v Derbyshire
- LA debut: 24 April 2011 Gloucestershire v Glamorgan

Career statistics
Competition	FC	LA	T20
Matches	57	68	158
Runs scored	2,684	1,633	3,869
Batting average	29.82	34.02	31.97
100s/50s	5/15	2/10	1/21
Top score	151*	108*	123
Balls bowled	47	–	–
Wickets	1	–	–
Bowling average	44.00	–	–
5 wickets in innings	0	–	–
10 wickets in match	0	–	–
Best bowling	1/23	–	–
Catches/stumpings	36/–	41/–	75/–
- Source: ESPNcricinfo, 31 August 2022

Ian Andrew Cockbain (born 17 February 1987) is an English cricketer who most recently played for Gloucestershire County Cricket Club. A right-handed batsman and right-hand medium pace bowler, he made his first-class debut for the county against Derbyshire in August 2011.

== Personal life ==
Cockbain was born in Liverpool and educated locally at Maghull High School and Liverpool John Moores University. His father, also called Ian, made 47 first-class cricket appearances for Lancashire in the 1980s.

== Domestic career ==
Cockbain started his career playing youth cricket for Lancashire and appeared for MCC young cricketers before joining Gloucestershire in 2010. He made his first-class debut in a seven-wicket victory against Derbyshire in April 2011. He opened the batting along with Chris Dent and scored just 5 in the first innings as Gloucestershire posted 343. In the second innings he saw Gloucestershire to victory, scoring 59 not out and making his maiden first-class half century. In the following game of the season he scored 21 and 47 against Glamorgan in a 189-run defeat. Cockbain made his List A debut against Glamorgan on 24 April; he scored just 4 in a three-wicket victory for Gloucestershire. Cockbain made scores of 1 and 72 as Gloucestershire drew in a first-class tie against Middlesex in May 2011. Cockbain scored his maiden first-class century in June 2011 against Middlesex in a drawn match. He scored 127 from 233 deliveries batting at number five, a knock which included 16 fours and 1 six. On 24 July, Cockbain made his highest one-day score of 79 runs from 84 balls in a 19-run defeat. On 4 August 2011, Cockbain scored 59 from 50 balls to record his third one-day half-century in a six-wicket defeat. He has secured a place in the Gloucestershire 1st XI middle order as a reliable batsman, and recorded one day half centuries against Essex and Lancashire respectively in 2012 to go with a match saving 112 and 51 against Hampshire at Bristol.

In 2013, Cockbain was used almost exclusively by Gloucestershire as a limited overs player. Players from the 2nd XI being promoted over him, resulting in him playing just one first-class match in 2013.

In April 2022, he was bought by the Trent Rockets for the 2022 season of The Hundred.

Cockbain was released by Gloucestershire at the end of the 2022 season.
