= Leus du Plooy =

South African-Hungarian cricketer (born 1995)

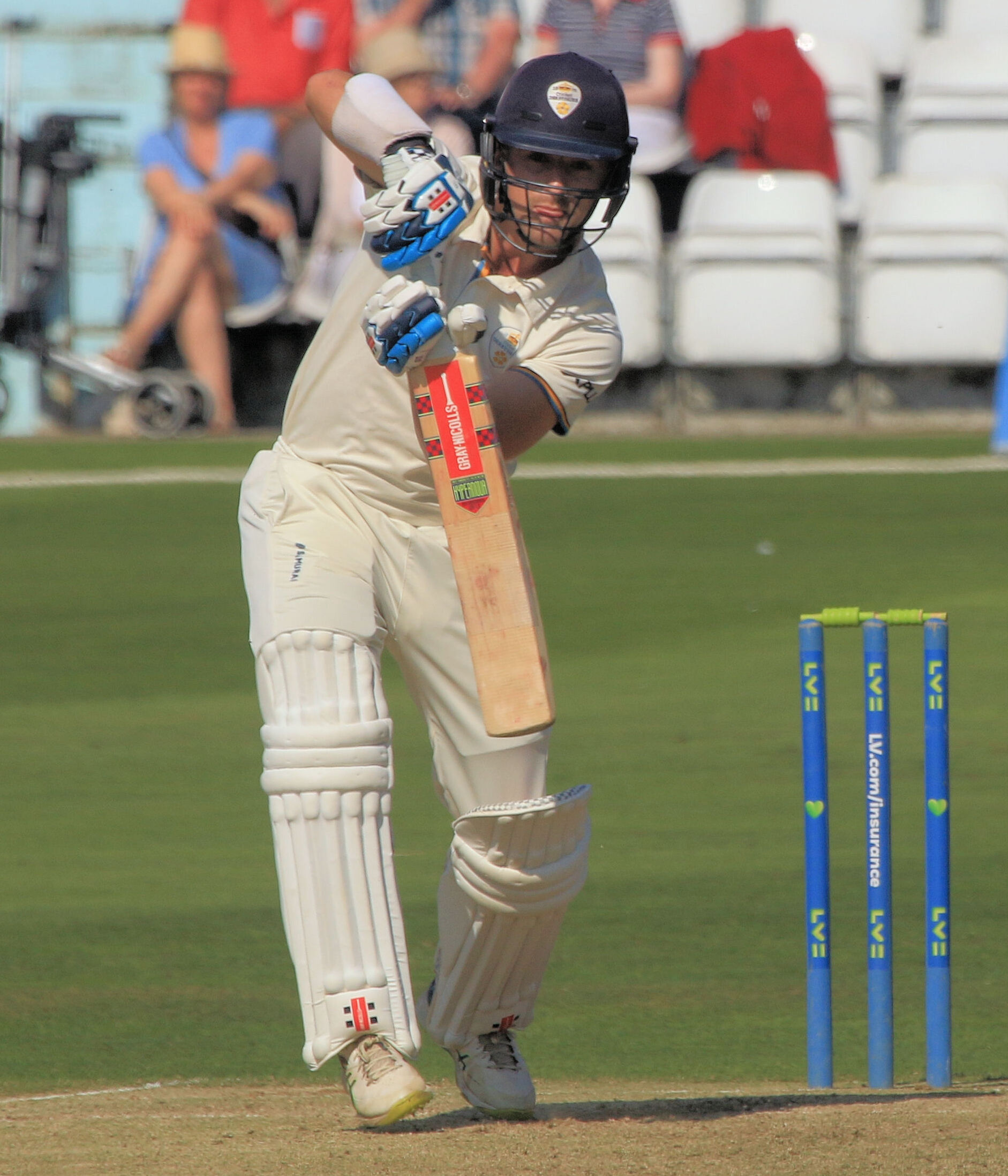
- du Plooy in 2023

Personal information
- Full name: Jacobus Leus du Plooy
- Born: 12 January 1995 (age 31); Pretoria, Gauteng, South Africa
- Batting: Left-handed
- Bowling: Slow left-arm orthodox
- Role: Batter; Captain

Domestic team information
- Years: Team
- 2013/14–2017/18: Free State
- 2015/16–2017/18: Knights
- 2018/19: Northerns
- 2018/19: Titans
- 2019–2023: Derbyshire (squad no. 76)
- 2021–2022: Welsh Fire
- 2021/22: South Western Districts
- 2022/23: Boland
- 2023–2025: Joburg Super Kings
- 2023–2025: Southern Brave
- 2024–2025: Dubai Capitals
- 2024–2026: Middlesex (squad no. 76)
- 2024: Karachi Kings
- 2025/26: Dolphins
- 2026: Manchester Super Giants

Career statistics
Competition	FC	LA	T20
Matches	140	50	226
Runs scored	9,419	2,002	4,671
Batting average	48.55	54.10	27.97
100s/50s	26/48	5/11	0/26
Top score	263*	155	92
Balls bowled	2,519	417	218
Wickets	30	11	14
Bowling average	59.23	38.18	22.00
5 wickets in innings	0	0	0
10 wickets in match	0	0	0
Best bowling	3/76	3/19	4/15
Catches/stumpings	101/–	24/–	110/–
- Source: ESPNcricinfo, 6 September 2026

Jacobus Leus du Plooy (born 12 January 1995) is a Hungarian-South African first-class cricketer who plays for, and captains Middlesex.

He was included in the Free State squad for the 2016 Africa T20 Cup. In August 2017, he was named in Benoni Zalmi's squad for the first season of the T20 Global League. However, in October 2017, Cricket South Africa initially postponed the tournament until November 2018, with it being cancelled soon after.

In September 2018, du Plooy was named in Northerns' squad for the 2018 Africa T20 Cup. He was the leading run-scorer for Northerns in the tournament, with 145 runs in four matches. He was also the leading run-scorer in the 2018–19 CSA Provincial One-Day Challenge, with 593 runs in eleven matches, and again for Northerns in the 2018–19 CSA 3-Day Provincial Cup, with 647 runs in eleven matches.

In April 2019, du Plooy signed a two-year contract to play county cricket in England, joining Derbyshire as a Kolpak player. In April 2022, he was bought by the Welsh Fire for the 2022 season of The Hundred. He was appointed captain of Derbyshire, replacing Billy Godleman, in October 2022.

In July 2023, it was announced that du Plooy would join Middlesex from the 2024 season, agreeing a contract that will keep him at the club until 2028. On 9 July 2025, Du Plooy was appointed as Middlesex club captain, taking up the role across all formats. In September 2026, it was announced that he would leave Middlesex at the end of that year's county season to pursue the possibility of playing internationally for his native South Africa.

In September 2023 Du Plooy made his debut for the Hungarian National Cricket side scoring 93 runs and taking 3 wickets in a T10 victory against Finland.

== Personal life ==
Du Plooy is of Hungarian descent and holds a Hungarian passport.
