= Ryan Higgins (cricketer, born 1995) =

Zimbabwean cricketer (born 1995)

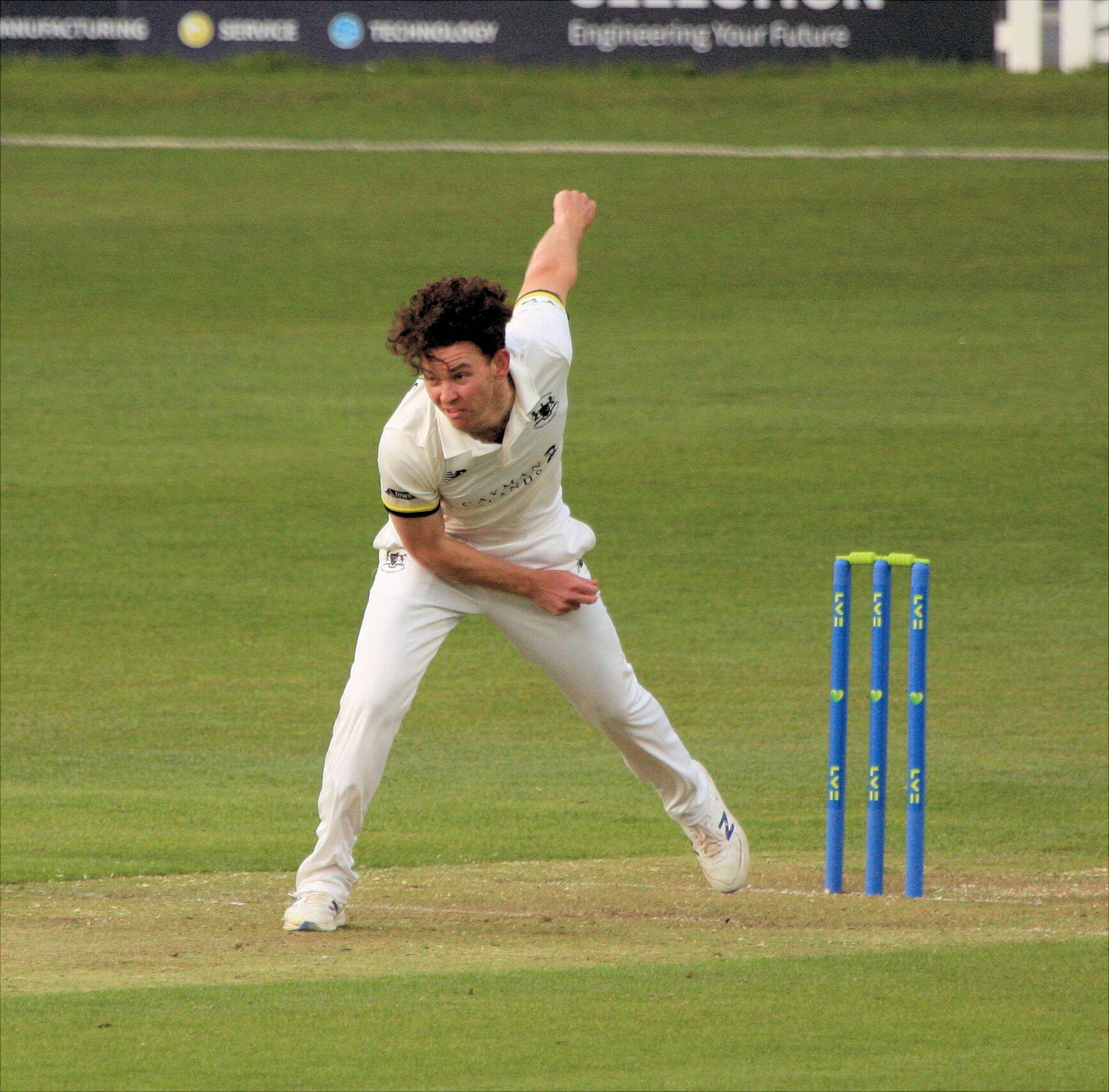
- Higgins in 2022

Personal information
- Full name: Ryan Francis Higgins
- Born: 6 January 1995 (age 31); Harare, Zimbabwe
- Batting: Right-handed
- Bowling: Right-arm medium Right-arm off break

Domestic team information
- Years: Team
- 2014–2017: Middlesex (squad no. 11)
- 2018–2022: Gloucestershire (squad no. 29)
- 2022: → Middlesex (loan) (squad no. 29)
- 2021–2022: Welsh Fire (squad no. 29)
- 2023–present: Middlesex (squad no. 29)
- 2024–2025: London Spirit (squad no. 29)
- 2024/25: Southern Rocks
- First-class debut: 19 June 2017 Middlesex v Yorkshire
- List A debut: 26 July 2014 Middlesex v Glamorgan

Career statistics
Competition	FC	LA	T20
Matches	122	47	150
Runs scored	6,097	1,328	2,432
Batting average	35.04	34.94	23.84
100s/50s	14/24	1/8	0/6
Top score	221	100	77*
Balls bowled	20,238	1,617	1,821
Wickets	381	41	105
Bowling average	24.60	34.31	26.74
5 wickets in innings	8	0	1
10 wickets in match	1	0	0
Best bowling	7/42	4/33	5/13
Catches/stumpings	66/–	9/–	49/–
- Source: ESPNcricinfo, 27 September 2026

Ryan Francis Higgins (born 6 January 1995) is a professional cricketer who plays for Middlesex.

He is a right-handed batter who bowls right arm medium pace.

== Early life ==
Higgins was born in Harare, Zimbabwe and attended Ruzawi School, before moving to Berkshire at the age of 13, where he attended Bradfield College.

== Career ==
Higgins began his career with Middlesex, making his professional debut in the 2014 NatWest t20 Blast against Somerset in 2014. He took his first five-wicket haul against Hampshire at the Rose Bowl in the 2016 NatWest t20 Blast. Having initially only played for Middlesex's limited overs sides, he made his first-class debut against Yorkshire in June 2017.

Frustrated by a lack of first team opportunities, Higgins moved to Gloucestershire at the end of the 2017 season. In 2019, he was part of the side that won promotion from the County Championship Division Two, scoring a total of 958 runs and taking 50 wickets over the season. In September 2019, Higgins was shortlisted for the Professional Cricketers Association, Players Player of the Year award.

In August 2022, it was announced that Higgins would be returning to Middlesex on a four-year deal at the end of the season. The following month, he moved to the club on loan for the remainder of the 2022 County Championship, helping them win promotion to Division One ahead of his permanent return.

Higgins represented Welsh Fire in the 2021 and 2022 seasons of The Hundred, before being selected by London Spirit in 2024. He also represented the Southern Rocks in the 2024-25 Logan Cup.

In March 2026, Higgins signed a "long-term" contract extension with Middlesex although the exact terms of the deal, including the length of the agreement, were not made public.

In 2010 he and his brother Dylan were contracted to play for Potterne CC near Devizes and featured in a Radio 4 documentary about overseas players in club cricket ‘Australian wanted in Woodhall Spa’
