= Nicole Harvey =

English cricketer

Personal information
- Full name: Nicole Harvey
- Born: 18 September 1992 (age 34); Truro, Cornwall, England
- Batting: Right-handed
- Bowling: Right-arm leg break
- Role: All-rounder

Domestic team information
- Years: Team
- 2005–2008: Cornwall
- 2009–2010: Devon
- 2011–2012: Nottinghamshire
- 2013–2014: Cornwall
- 2015–present: Somerset
- 2021–2023: Western Storm
- 2021–2022: Welsh Fire

Career statistics
Competition	WLA	WT20
Matches	86	78
Runs scored	1,343	603
Batting average	23.56	14.38
100s/50s	0/4	0/0
Top score	99*	46
Balls bowled	3,435	1,507
Wickets	108	84
Bowling average	17.20	14.79
5 wickets in innings	1	0
10 wickets in match	0	0
Best bowling	5/22	4/2
Catches/stumpings	16/–	21/–
- Source: CricketArchive, 22 October 2023

Nicole Harvey (née Richards; born 18 September 1992) is an English cricketer who currently plays for Somerset. She plays primarily as a right-arm leg break bowler, whilst also batting right-handed. She has previously played for Cornwall, Devon, Nottinghamshire, Western Storm and Welsh Fire.

== Early and personal life ==
Harvey was born Nicole Richards on 18 September 1992 in Truro, Cornwall. Her mother, Marilyn Richards, also played for Cornwall, in 2008 and 2009. In 2020, whilst pregnant with her first child, Harvey was diagnosed with sepsis, but later recovered and gave birth in late 2020.

== Domestic career ==
Harvey made her county debut in 2005, for Cornwall against Devon in the County Challenge Cup, in which she hit 16* in an 8 wicket victory. Harvey went on to play for Cornwall until the end of the 2008 season, and was the side's leading wicket-taker in the 2008 Women's County Championship, with 9 wickets at an average of 7.00, including a best bowling of 4/30.

Ahead of the 2009 season, Harvey moved to play for Devon. She spent two seasons with the side, taking 17 Championship wickets (9 in 2009 and 8 in 2010), as well as scoring 218 runs in the 2010 Championship, including scoring 70 against Wales. The following season, 2011, Harvey moved to Nottinghamshire. Her best performances for the side came that season in the Championship, where she took 9 wickets, including a best bowling of 4/25.

Ahead of the 2013 season, Harvey moved back to Cornwall. She had a successful two-year stay with the side, as their leading wicket-taker in the 2013 Women's County Championship and the 2014 Women's Twenty20 Cup, and their leading run-scorer in the 2014 Women's County Championship.

In 2015, Harvey moved to Somerset. In 2016, she was the leading wicket-taker across the whole Twenty20 Cup, with 15 wickets at an average of 6.53, helping Somerset to promotion from Division 2. The following season, she was Somerset's leading wicket-taker in the 2017 Women's County Championship, with 14 wickets including her maiden five-wicket haul, 5/22 against Surrey. She was also Somerset's joint-leading wicket taker in the following Championship season, with 11 wickets at an average of 15.72.

2019 was a strong season for Harvey: she made her List A high score, making 99* against Durham, took the joint-second highest wicket tally in the Championship, with 14 wickets, and was Somerset's leading wicket-taker in the Twenty20 Cup, with 12 wickets. In 2021, Harvey helped Somerset to winning the West Midlands Group of the Twenty20 Cup, and took 4/2 from 4 overs in a match against Berkshire. In the 2022 Women's Twenty20 Cup, she played four matches, scoring 83 runs and taking four wickets.

In 2021, Harvey was selected in the Western Storm squad for their upcoming season. She made her debut for the side on 29 May, against North West Thunder in the Rachael Heyhoe Flint Trophy. She went on to take 6 wickets in the tournament, at an average of 29.83. She was also Western Storm's leading wicket-taker, and the fourth-highest across the whole competition, in the Charlotte Edwards Cup, with 12 wickets at an average of 9.41 and an economy of 4.70. She also played for Welsh Fire in The Hundred, taking 4 wickets with the best runs per ball rate for her side, at 1.17. She played just one match for Western Storm in 2022, in the Charlotte Edwards Cup. She was again in the Welsh Fire squad, but did not play a match for the side. In 2023, she played five matches for Western Storm, all in the Rachael Heyhoe Flint Trophy, taking three wickets.
