= Matt Critchley =

English cricketer (born 1996)

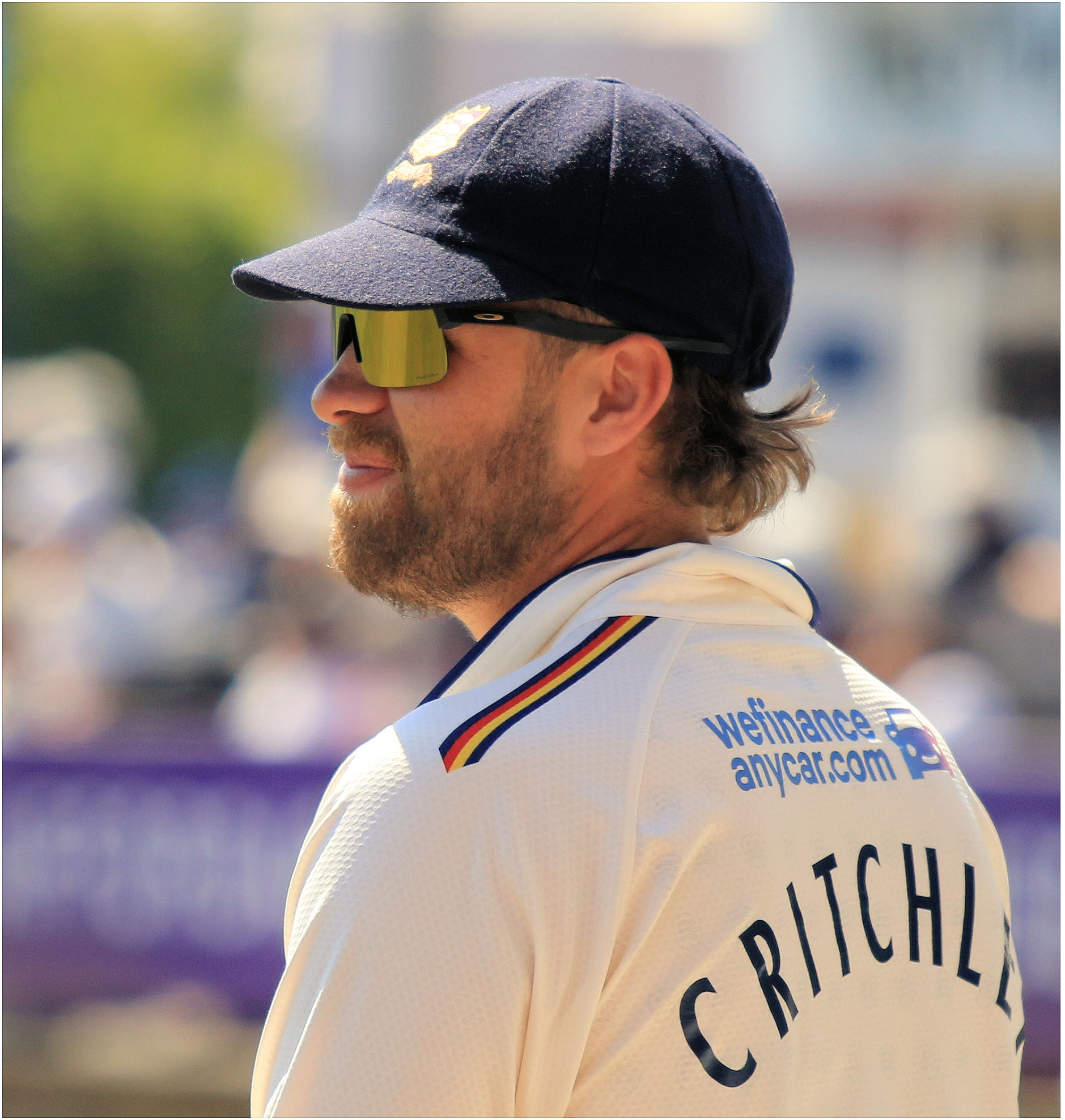
- Critchley in 2025

Personal information
- Full name: Matthew James John Critchley
- Born: 13 August 1996 (age 30); Preston, Lancashire, England
- Batting: Right-handed
- Bowling: Right-arm leg break
- Role: All-rounder

Domestic team information
- Years: Team
- 2015–2021: Derbyshire
- 2021–2022: Welsh Fire
- 2022–present: Essex
- 2023: Melbourne Renegades
- 2023–2024: London Spirit
- 2024: Pokhara Avengers
- First-class debut: 3 May 2015 Derbyshire v Glamorgan
- List A debut: 27 July 2015 Derbyshire v Yorkshire

Career statistics
Competition	FC	LA	T20
Matches	136	62	168
Runs scored	7,112	1,354	2,266
Batting average	34.69	33.02	20.05
100s/50s	13/38	2/6	0/6
Top score	173	103	80*
Balls bowled	13,652	2,180	2,638
Wickets	244	54	141
Bowling average	36.05	44.25	25.64
5 wickets in innings	8	0	1
10 wickets in match	1	0	0
Best bowling	6/73	4/48	5/28
Catches/stumpings	89/–	17/–	47/–
- Source: Cricinfo, 27 September 2026

Matthew James John Critchley (born 13 August 1996) is an English cricketer, playing for Essex County Cricket Club having signed for them from Derbyshire County Cricket Club. He made his first-class debut on 3 May 2015 in the 2015 County Championship against Glamorgan. In his second game, he became the youngest player to score a century for Derbyshire. He made his Twenty20 debut on 21 May 2016 for Derbyshire against Lancashire Lightning in the 2016 NatWest t20 Blast.

Critchley signed a two-year contract extension with Derbyshire in July 2020. In October 2021 it was announced that Critchley had joined Essex on a three-year deal for an undisclosed fee. In April 2022, he was bought by the Welsh Fire for the 2022 season of The Hundred. In 2023, Critchley played six games for the Melbourne Renegades in the 2022-23 Big Bash. He was then drafted into London Spirit to play for them in The 3rd Series of The Hundred 2023.
