= Claire Nicholas =

Retired Welsh cricketer

Personal information
- Full name: Claire Louise Nicholas
- Born: 8 September 1986 (age 40); Swansea, Wales
- Batting: Right-handed
- Bowling: Right-arm off break
- Role: Bowler

Domestic team information
- Years: Team
- 2004–2024: Wales
- 2017–2024: Western Storm
- 2022–2024: Welsh Fire

Career statistics
Competition	WLA	WT20
Matches	92	99
Runs scored	1,113	455
Batting average	15.45	16.85
100s/50s	0/5	0/0
Top score	62	42
Balls bowled	4,262	1,930
Wickets	104	96
Bowling average	21.18	18.35
5 wickets in innings	1	0
10 wickets in match	0	0
Best bowling	5/20	4/11
Catches/stumpings	25/–	32/–
- Source: CricketArchive, 19 October 2024

Claire Louise Nicholas (née Thomas; born 8 September 1986) is a retired Welsh cricketer who played for Wales and Welsh Fire. She played as a right-arm off break bowler. She won two Women's Cricket Super Leagues with Western Storm, in 2017 and 2019.

== Early and personal life ==
Nicholas was born Claire Louise Thomas on 8 September 1986 in Swansea, Wales. She has two children with her partner, Rachel. She also works as a teacher.

== Domestic career ==
Nicholas made her debut for Wales in 2004, against Warwickshire in the County Challenge Cup. The following season, she appeared for Wales in the 2005 Women's European Championship. She was part of the Wales side that gained three consecutive promotions in the County Championship between 2008 and 2010, and took her maiden five-wicket haul in 2013, against Devon. In 2019, she was Wales' leading wicket-taker in the County Championship, with 10 wickets at an average of 17.70. She took seven wickets for the side in the 2022 Women's Twenty20 Cup, including taking 4/20 against Somerset. She took three wickets in five matches for the side in the 2023 Women's Twenty20 Cup.

Nicholas also played for Western Storm in the Women's Cricket Super League between 2017 and 2019. Nicholas was a key bowler throughout the three seasons, taking 27 wickets at an average of 21.33, with a best of 3/11 against Lancashire Thunder in 2018. Storm won the WCSL twice whilst Nicholas was part of the team, in 2017 and 2019.

In 2020, Nicholas continued to play for Western Storm in the Rachael Heyhoe Flint Trophy. She appeared in three matches, taking two wickets at an average of 44.50. She signed to play for Welsh Fire in The Hundred in 2021, but withdrew as she was due to give birth that summer. She was also not named in the initial Western Storm squad for the 2021 season for the same reason. In August 2021, Nicholas returned to the Western Storm squad, and played her first match of the season in the Charlotte Edwards Cup against North West Thunder. She played four matches overall for the side in 2021, taking 3 wickets in the Rachael Heyhoe Flint Trophy and 2 in the Charlotte Edwards Cup. In 2022, Nicholas was Western Storm's joint-leading wicket-taker in the Charlotte Edwards Cup, with six wickets at an average of 17.50, as well as taking three wickets in the Rachael Heyhoe Flint Trophy. She was also the leading wicket-taker for Welsh Fire in The Hundred, with six wickets at an average of 16.50.

In 2023, she played five matches for Western Storm, across the Rachael Heyhoe Flint Trophy and the Charlotte Edwards Cup, taking three wickets. She also played eight matches for Welsh Fire in The Hundred, taking three wickets.
