= Alex Griffiths (cricketer) =

Welsh cricketer

Personal information
- Full name: Alexandra Clare Griffiths
- Born: 12 June 2002 (age 24); Swansea, Wales
- Batting: Right-handed
- Bowling: Right-arm medium
- Role: All-rounder

Domestic team information
- Years: Team
- 2016–2024: Wales
- 2019–2024: Western Storm
- 2021–2024: Welsh Fire
- 2025: Somerset

Career statistics
Competition	WLA	WT20
Matches	62	72
Runs scored	1,016	476
Batting average	18.84	11.33
100s/50s	0/4	0/1
Top score	80	50
Balls bowled	1,280	537
Wickets	28	25
Bowling average	41.21	27.68
5 wickets in innings	0	0
10 wickets in match	0	0
Best bowling	2/2	3/12
Catches/stumpings	17/–	14/–
- Source: CricketArchive, 19 October 2024

Alexandra Clare Griffiths (born 12 June 2002) is a Welsh cricketer who currently plays for Somerset. An all-rounder, she is a right-handed batter and right-arm medium bowler.

== Early life ==
Griffiths was born on 12 June 2002 in Swansea.

== Domestic career ==
Griffiths made her county debut in 2016, for Wales against Essex. She scored 4 runs and did not bowl. She began playing regularly from 2017, and hit 42 in a Championship match that season against Hampshire. Griffiths' stand-out season to date was in 2019, when she scored 168 runs in the County Championship, including hitting her maiden county half-century, 69 against Berkshire. She also began to bowl more regularly, and was Wales' leading wicket-taker in the Twenty20 Cup, taking 9 wickets at an average of 8.11. She also achieved her best Twenty20 bowling, taking 3/12 against Hampshire. She scored her maiden Twenty20 half-century in the 2022 Women's Twenty20 Cup, against Gloucestershire.

Griffiths also played for Western Storm in their title-winning Women's Cricket Super League season in 2019. She played five matches and took one wicket.

In 2020, Griffiths remained in the Western Storm squad for the Rachael Heyhoe Flint Trophy. She appeared in all six matches, scoring 141 runs at an average of 35.25 and taking 3 wickets. She also achieved her List A high score, hitting 80 off 68 balls in a victory over Sunrisers and was voted Supporters' Player of the Year at the end of the season. In December 2020, it was announced that Griffiths was one of the 41 female cricketers that had signed a full-time domestic contract.

In 2021, Griffiths played three matches in the Rachael Heyhoe Flint Trophy for Western Storm, and hit 55 off 60 balls in the final match against Sunrisers. She also took 3 wickets at an average of 17.33 in the Charlotte Edwards Cup. Griffiths also played 7 matches for Welsh Fire in The Hundred, the only female Welsh player in the squad. She was ever-present for Western Storm in 2022, across the Charlotte Edwards Cup and the Rachael Heyhoe Flint Trophy, scoring 166 runs with a top score of 48 and taking three wickets. She was also again in the Welsh Fire squad in The Hundred, but did not play a match.

In 2023, she played 19 matches for Western Storm, across the Rachael Heyhoe Flint Trophy and the Charlotte Edwards Cup, scoring one half-century and taking 11 wickets at an average of 31.45 in the Rachael Heyhoe Flint Trophy. She also played eight matches for Welsh Fire in The Hundred, taking five wickets. In 2024, she played 20 matches for Western Storm, across the Rachael Heyhoe Flint Trophy and the Charlotte Edwards Cup, taking 11 wickets.
