= Welsh Fire =

The Hundred franchise in Cardiff, Wales

Welsh Fire Tân Cymreig

Personnel
- Captain: Sophie Devine (women); Phil Salt (men)
- Coach: Michael Klinger (women); Michael Hussey (men)
- Overseas players: Sophie Devine; Heather Graham; Orla Prendergast; Georgia Voll; Georgia Wareham; (women); Lockie Ferguson; Marco Jansen; Rachin Ravindra; Matthew Short; (men)
- Owner: Glamorgan County Cricket Club (50%), Washington Freedom (50%)

Team information
- Colours
- Founded: 2019; 7 years ago
- Home ground: Sophia Gardens
- Capacity: 16,000

History
- No. of titles: 0
The Hundred kit

Welsh Fire (Welsh: Tân Cymreig) are a franchise 100-ball cricket side based in the city of Cardiff. The team represents the historic counties of Glamorgan, Gloucestershire and Somerset in The Hundred, which took place for the first time during the 2021 English and Welsh cricket season. Both the men's and women's teams play their home games at Sophia Gardens in Cardiff.

== History ==
Welsh Fire was founded in June 2019 as one of eight teams to take part in the inaugural season of The Hundred. The team was jointly run by Glamorgan, Somerset and Gloucestershire County Cricket Clubs. It was reported that the side might be renamed as Western Fire, to allay concerns in Somerset and Gloucestershire that they were not sufficiently represented by the side, but this did not come to fruition.

In July 2019, the team announced that former South Africa and India coach, and current Royal Challengers Bangalore coach Gary Kirsten had been appointed as the men's team coach. The women's side was due to be managed by Matthew Mott, a former Glamorgan coach and the current Australia women's team coach, but he withdrew and was replaced by his assistant coach, Mark O'Leary.

The inaugural Hundred draft took place in October 2019 and saw the Fire claim Jonny Bairstow as their headline men's draftee, and Katie George as the women's headliner. They are joined by Somerset wicketkeeper-batsman Tom Banton, Glamorgan batsman Colin Ingram, and England batter Bryony Smith.

Steve Smith and Mitchell Starc were selected as the flagship £125,000 signings in the first round and are two of the side's three overseas players. With Ingram and Banton already occupying the £100,000 slots, Welsh Fire sat out the second round. Ravi Rampaul and Ben Duckett were selected in the third round for £75,000 and Simon Harmer, along with Afghanistan's Qais Ahmed (the team's third overseas player), were bought for £60,000 in the fourth. Liam Plunkett and Ryan ten Doeschate were the picks in the fifth round for £50,000 and Gloucestershire duo David Payne and Ryan Higgins were selected in the sixth round for £40,000. Danny Briggs and Leus du Plooy complete the squad, having both been bought for £30,000 in the final round. The final place in the squad will go to an outstanding performer in next season's Vitality Blast 20-over competition.

Australian Meg Lanning was the next pick for the ladies' team.

As part of the 2025 Hundred sale, the ECB gave Glamorgan County Cricket Club a 51% stake in the franchise with the remaining 49% sold in an auction process. Glamorgan County Cricket Club opted to sell 1% of their stake with Washington Freedom acquiring 50% of the franchise. They took operational control on 1 October 2025.

== Honours ==
=== Men's honours ===
The Hundred

- 4th place: 2023 (highest finish)

=== Women's honours ===
The Hundred

- Runners Up: 2024
- Third place: 2023

== Ground ==
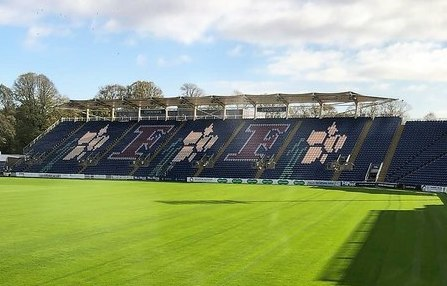
Sophia Gardens

Both the Fire men's and women's sides play at the home of Glamorgan County Cricket Club, Sophia Gardens Cricket Ground, in the west of Cardiff city centre. The women's side had been due to play some matches at Gloucestershire's Bristol County Ground and Somerset's County Ground, Taunton but both teams were brought together at the same ground as a result of the COVID-19 pandemic.

== Current squads ==
- **Bold** denotes players with international caps.
- * denotes a player who is unavailable for rest of the season.

=== Women's side ===
No.	Name	Nationality	Date of birth (age)	Batting style	Bowling style	Notes
Batters
6	**Freya Kemp**	England	21 April 2005 (age 21)	Left-handed	Left-arm medium	England central contract
12	Abi Norgrove	England	17 January 2006 (age 20)	Right-handed	Right-arm off break	
13	**Georgia Voll**	Australia	5 August 2003 (age 23)	Right-handed	Right-arm off break	Overseas player
86	Ella McCaughan	England	26 September 2002 (age 23)	Right-handed	Right-arm leg break	
All-rounders
10	**Orla Prendergast**	Ireland	1 June 2002 (age 24)	Right-handed	Right-arm medium	Overseas player; Replacement player
11	**Heather Graham**	Australia	10 May 1996 (age 30)	Right-handed	Right-arm medium	Overseas player
27	Niamh Holland	England	27 October 2004 (age 21)	Right-handed	Right-arm medium	Wildcard player
35	**Georgia Wareham**	Australia	26 May 1999 (age 27)	Right-handed	Right-arm leg break	Overseas player
77	**Sophie Devine**	New Zealand	1 September 1989 (age 36)	Right-handed	Right-arm medium	Captain; Overseas player; Ruled out through injury
—	Fi Morris	England	31 January 1994 (age 32)	Right-handed	Right-arm off break	
Wicket-keepers
8	**Sarah Bryce**	Scotland	8 January 2000 (age 26)	Right-handed	—	
17	Rhianna Southby	England	16 October 2000 (age 25)	Right-handed	—	
Pace bowlers
9	Grace Potts	England	12 July 2002 (age 24)	Right-handed	Right-arm medium	
37	**Em Arlott**	England	23 February 1998 (age 28)	Right-handed	Right-arm medium	
88	Grace Thompson	England	30 May 2007 (age 19)	Right-handed	Right-arm medium	
Spin bowlers
16	Sophia Smale	Wales	8 December 2004 (age 21)	Right-handed	Slow left-arm orthodox	
64	**Georgia Davis**	England	3 June 1999 (age 27)	Right-handed	Right-arm off break	Wildcard player

=== Men's side ===
No.	Name	Nationality	Date of birth (age)	Batting style	Bowling style	Notes
Batters
2	**Matthew Short**	Australia	8 November 1995 (age 30)	Right-handed	Right-arm off break	Overseas player
22	**Jordan Cox**	England	21 October 2000 (age 25)	Right-handed	Right-arm off break	
32	Tom Kohler-Cadmore	England	19 August 1994 (age 31)	Right-handed	Right-arm off break	
55	**Asa Tribe**	Jersey	29 March 2004 (age 22)	Right-handed	Right-arm off break	
66	**Joe Root**	England	30 December 1990 (age 35)	Right-handed	Right-arm off break	England central contract
All-rounders
8	Ben Kellaway	Wales	5 January 2004 (age 22)	Right-handed	Right-arm off break Slow left-arm orthodox	
17	**Rachin Ravindra**	New Zealand	18 November 1999 (age 26)	Left-handed	Slow left-arm orthodox	Overseas player
70	**Marco Jansen**	South Africa	1 May 2000 (age 26)	Right-handed	Left-arm fast-medium	Overseas player
Wicket-keepers
61	**Phil Salt**	England	26 August 1996 (age 29)	Right-handed	Right-arm off break	Captain; England central contract
Pace bowlers
7	Jordan Clark	England	14 October 1990 (age 35)	Right-handed	Right-arm fast-medium	Wildcard player
16	**Sam Cook**	England	4 August 1997 (age 29)	Right-handed	Right-arm fast-medium	
19	**Chris Woakes**	England	2 March 1989 (age 37)	Right-handed	Right-arm fast-medium	
69	**Lockie Ferguson**	New Zealand	13 June 1991 (age 35)	Right-handed	Right-arm fast	Overseas player
—	Tom Aspinwall	England	13 March 2004 (age 22)	Right-handed	Right-arm medium	
—	Dillon Pennington	England	26 February 1999 (age 27)	Right-handed	Right-arm fast-medium	Wildcard player
Spin bowlers
—	Jafer Chohan	England	11 July 2002 (age 24)	Right-handed	Right-arm leg break	

== Seasons ==
=== Women's team ===
Season	Group stage							Playoff stage		Ref.
Season	Pld	W	L	T	NR	Pts	Pos	Pld	Pos	Ref.
2021	8	2	6	0	0	4	8th	Did not progress		
2022	6	1	5	0	0	2	8th	Did not progress		
2023	8	5	2	0	1	11	3rd	1 (Note: Welsh Fire women qualified for the eliminator in 2023. They played one match, a playoff against Northern Superchargers. After the first innings, rain caused the game to be abandoned with the game ending in a "no result". As Welsh Fire finished the group in 3rd and the Northern Superchargers finished in 2nd, the Northern Superchargers progressed to the final due to a better finishing position in the group stage.)	3rd	
2024	8	5	2	0	1	11	1st	1 (Note: Welsh Fire women finished top of the group stage and qualified automatically for the final in 2024. They lost the final against London Spirit by 4 wickets.)	2nd	
2025	8	1	7	0	0	4	8th	Did not progress		
2026	8	4	4	0	0	16	5th	Did not progress		

=== Men's team ===
Season	Group stage							Playoff stage		Ref.
Season	Pld	W	L	T	NR	Pts	Pos	Pld	Pos	Ref.
2021	8	3	5	0	0	6	7th	Did not progress		
2022	8	0	8	0	0	0	8th	Did not progress		
2023	8	4	3	1	0	9	4th	Did not progress		
2024	8	2	4	0	2	6	6th	Did not progress		
2025	8	2	6	0	0	8	8th	Did not progress		
2026	8	4	4	0	0	16	5th	Did not progress		

== See also ==
- List of Welsh Fire cricketers
- List of cricket grounds in England and Wales
- List of Test cricket grounds
