= 2016 Surrey Stars season =

Surrey Stars
2016 season
- Coach: Richard Bedbrook
- Captain: Nat Sciver
- Overseas player: Rene Farrell; Marizanne Kapp; Lea Tahuhu
- WCSL: Group stage, 4th
- Most runs: Nat Sciver (181)
- Most wickets: Alex Hartley (8)
- Most catches: Beth Morgan (3); Nat Sciver (3)
- Most wicket-keeping dismissals: Tammy Beaumont (1)

The 2016 season was Surrey Stars' first season, in which they competed in the Women's Cricket Super League, a Twenty20 competition. The side finished fourth in the group stage, winning two of their five matches.

The side was based in South London, and was partnered with Surrey County Cricket Club. They played one home match at The Oval and one at Woodbridge Road, Guildford. Surrey Stars' coach was Richard Bedbrook, and they were captained by Nat Sciver.

== Squad ==
Surrey Stars' 15-player squad is listed below. Meg Lanning and Kirstie White were originally named in the squad, but were both ruled out due to injury and replaced by Lea Tahuhu and Naomi Dattani, respectively. Age given is at the start of Surrey Stars' first match of the season (31 July 2016).

Name	Nationality	Birth date	Batting Style	Bowling Style	Notes
Batters
Aylish Cranstone	England	28 August 1994 (aged 21)	Left-handed	Left-arm medium	
Cordelia Griffith	England	19 September 1995 (aged 20)	Right-handed	Right-arm medium	
All-rounders
Naomi Dattani	England	28 April 1994 (aged 22)	Left-handed	Left-arm medium	
Sophia Dunkley	England	16 July 1998 (aged 18)	Right-handed	Right-arm leg break	
Marizanne Kapp	South Africa	4 January 1990 (aged 26)	Right-handed	Right arm medium	Overseas player
Beth Morgan	England	27 September 1981 (aged 34)	Right-handed	Right-arm medium	
Nat Sciver	England	20 August 1992 (aged 23)	Right-handed	Right arm medium	Captain
Bryony Smith	England	12 December 1997 (aged 18)	Right-handed	Right-arm off break	
Wicket-keepers
Tammy Beaumont	England	11 March 1991 (aged 25)	Right-handed	—	
Bowlers
Rene Farrell	Australia	13 January 1987 (aged 29)	Right-handed	Right arm medium	Overseas player
Grace Gibbs	England	1 May 1995 (aged 21)	Right-handed	Right-arm medium	
Alex Hartley	England	6 September 1993 (aged 22)	Right-handed	Slow left-arm orthodox	
Raveena Lakhtaria	England	26 October 1992 (aged 23)	Right-handed	Right-arm off break	
Laura Marsh	England	5 December 1986 (aged 29)	Right-handed	Right arm off break	
Lea Tahuhu	New Zealand	23 September 1990 (aged 25)	Right-handed	Right arm medium-fast	Overseas player

== Women's Cricket Super League ==
=== Season standings ===
Points table
Pos	Team	Pld	W	L	T	NR	BP	Pts	NRR
1	Southern Vipers	5	4	1	0	0	3	11	1.437
2	Western Storm	5	4	1	0	0	1	9	0.838
3	Loughborough Lightning	5	3	2	0	0	2	8	0.170
4	Surrey Stars	5	2	3	0	0	1	5	−0.274
5	Yorkshire Diamonds	5	1	4	0	0	1	3	−0.362
6	Lancashire Thunder	5	1	4	0	0	0	2	−1.724

Source: ESPN Cricinfo

Advanced to the Final.
Advanced to the Semi-final.

=== League stage ===
31 July
14:00
Scorecard

Surrey Stars; 85/6 (20 overs)	v	Southern Vipers; 88/4 (15.2 overs)
Nat Sciver 36 (44); Tash Farrant 2/17 (4 overs)		Georgia Adams 41 (43); Alex Hartley 2/17 (4 overs)

Southern Vipers won by 6 wickets
Rose Bowl, Southampton
Umpires: Ian Blackwell and Paul Pollard

- Surrey Stars won the toss and elected to bat.
- Points: Southern Vipers 3, Surrey Stars 0

4 August
18:30 (D/N)
Scorecard

Yorkshire Diamonds; 134/5 (20 overs)	v	Surrey Stars; 135/4 (18.1 overs)
Hollie Armitage 43 (36); Alex Harley 2/18 (4 overs)		Tammy Beaumont 47 (45); Jenny Gunn 2/19 (4 overs)

Surrey Stars won by 6 wickets
The Oval, London
Umpires: Ian Blackwell and Russell Warren

- Yorkshire Diamonds won the toss and elected to bat.
- Points: Surrey Stars 2, Yorkshire Diamonds 0

7 August
14:30
Scorecard

Surrey Stars; 161/6 (20 overs)	v	Western Storm; 165/5 (19.4 overs)
Nat Sciver 90* (45); Freya Davies 2/38 (4 overs)		Stafanie Taylor 74* (48); Nat Sciver 2/17 (4 overs)

Western Storm won by 5 wickets
County Ground, Bristol
Umpires: Ben Debenham and Chris Watts

- Surrey Stars won the toss and elected to bat.
- Points: Western Storm 2, Surrey Stars 0

9 August
14:30
Scorecard

Lancashire Thunder; 102/9 (20 overs)	v	Surrey Stars; 106/3 (15.2 overs)
Amy Satterthwaite 34* (43); Alex Hartley 3/11 (4 overs)		Tammy Beaumont 45* (36); Deandra Dottin 1/13 (2 overs)

Surrey Stars won by 7 wickets
Woodbridge Road, Guildford
Umpires: Tom Lungley and Russell Warren

- Surrey Stars won the toss and elected to field.
- Points: Surrey Stars 3, Lancashire Thunder 0

12 August
16:30 (D/N)
Scorecard

Loughborough Lightning; 168/6 (20 overs)	v	Surrey Stars; 134 (19.5 overs)
Dane van Niekerk 91 (64); Lea Tahuhu 1/9 (1 over)		Laura Marsh 41 (24); Sophie Devine 2/12 (2.5 overs)

Loughborough Lightning won by 34 runs
Haslegrave Ground, Loughborough
Umpires: Paul Pollard and Russell Warren

- Surrey Stars won the toss and elected to field.
- Points: Loughborough Lightning 3, Surrey Stars 0

== Statistics ==
=== Batting ===
Player	Matches	Innings	NO	Runs	HS	Average	Strike rate	100s	50s	4s	6s
Tammy Beaumont	5	5	1	139	47	34.75	102.96	0	0	20	0
Naomi Dattani	3	2	0	14	8	7.00	50.00	0	0	1	0
Sophia Dunkley	2	1	0	0	0	0.00	0.00	0	0	0	0
Rene Farrell	5	3	2	31	17*	31.00	91.17	0	0	4	0
Cordelia Griffith	5	5	0	35	14	7.00	77.77	0	0	5	0
Alex Hartley	5	1	1	2	2*	–	50.00	0	0	0	0
Marizanne Kapp	5	5	1	13	6*	3.25	54.16	0	0	1	0
Laura Marsh	5	1	0	41	41	41.00	170.83	0	0	2	3
Beth Morgan	5	4	1	16	7	5.33	59.25	0	0	1	0
Nat Sciver	5	5	3	181	90*	90.50	134.07	0	1	25	3
Bryony Smith	5	5	0	94	31	18.80	101.07	0	0	17	0
Lea Tahuhu	5	1	0	8	8	8.00	66.66	0	0	1	0
Source: ESPN Cricinfo

=== Bowling ===
Player	Matches	Innings	Overs	Maidens	Runs	Wickets	BBI	Average	Economy	Strike rate
Rene Farrell	5	5	15.0	0	123	2	1/28	61.50	8.20	45.0
Alex Hartley	5	5	20.0	0	110	8	3/11	13.75	5.50	15.0
Marizanne Kapp	5	5	15.0	1	81	4	2/18	20.25	5.40	22.5
Laura Marsh	5	5	16.2	0	121	1	1/21	121.00	7.40	98.0
Nat Sciver	5	5	17.0	0	117	3	2/17	39.00	6.88	34.0
Lea Tahuhu	5	5	11.4	0	97	3	1/9	32.33	8.31	23.3
Source: ESPN Cricinfo

=== Fielding ===
Player	Matches	Innings	Catches
Naomi Dattani	3	3	0
Sophia Dunkley	2	2	0
Rene Farrell	5	5	0
Cordelia Griffith	5	5	1
Alex Hartley	5	5	2
Marizanne Kapp	5	5	0
Laura Marsh	5	5	0
Beth Morgan	5	5	3
Nat Sciver	5	5	3
Bryony Smith	5	5	0
Lea Tahuhu	5	5	0
Source: ESPN Cricinfo

=== Wicket-keeping ===
Player	Matches	Innings	Catches	Stumpings
Tammy Beaumont	5	5	1	0
Source: ESPN Cricinfo
