= 2019 Surrey Stars season =

Surrey Stars
2019 season
- Coach: Richard Bedbrook
- Captain: Nat Sciver
- Overseas player: Marizanne Kapp; Lizelle Lee; Dane van Niekerk
- WCSL: Group Stage, 5th
- Most runs: Sarah Taylor (260)
- Most wickets: Dane van Niekerk (12)
- Most catches: Dane van Niekerk (5)
- Most wicket-keeping dismissals: Sarah Taylor (9)

The 2019 season was Surrey Stars' fourth and final season, in which they competed in the final edition of the Women's Cricket Super League, a Twenty20 competition. The side finished fifth in the group stage, winning three of their ten matches.

The side was captained by Nat Sciver and coached by Richard Bedbrook. They played four home matches at Woodbridge Road, Guildford and one at The Oval. Following the season, women's domestic cricket in England was reformed, with the creation of new "regional hubs", with Surrey Stars replaced by South East Stars, which retained some elements of the original team but represent a larger area.

== Squad ==
Surrey Stars' 15-player squad is listed below. Age given is at the start of Surrey Stars' first match of the season (6 August 2019).

Name	Nationality	Birth date	Batting style	Bowling style	Notes
Batters
Aylish Cranstone	England	28 August 1994 (aged 24)	Left-handed	Left-arm medium	
Lizelle Lee	South Africa	2 April 1992 (aged 27)	Right-handed	Right-arm medium	Overseas player
All-rounders
Hannah Jones	England	21 July 1999 (aged 20)	Right-handed	Right-arm off break	
Marizanne Kapp	South Africa	4 January 1990 (aged 29)	Right-handed	Right arm medium	Overseas player
Nat Sciver	England	20 August 1992 (aged 26)	Right-handed	Right arm medium	Captain
Bryony Smith	England	12 December 1997 (aged 21)	Right-handed	Right-arm off break	
Dane van Niekerk	South Africa	14 May 1993 (aged 26)	Right-handed	Right-arm leg break	Overseas player
Wicket-keepers
Gwenan Davies	Wales	12 May 1994 (aged 25)	Left-handed	Right-arm medium	
Rhianna Southby	England	16 October 2000 (aged 18)	Right-handed	—	
Sarah Taylor	England	20 May 1989 (aged 30)	Right-handed	—	
Bowlers
Grace Gibbs	England	1 May 1995 (aged 24)	Right-handed	Right-arm medium	
Amy Gordon	England	3 October 2001 (aged 17)	Right-handed	Right-arm medium	
Eva Gray	England	24 May 2000 (aged 19)	Right-handed	Right-arm medium	
Laura Marsh	England	5 December 1986 (aged 32)	Right-handed	Right arm off break	
Mady Villiers	England	26 August 1998 (aged 20)	Right-handed	Right-arm off break	

== Women's Cricket Super League ==
=== Season standings ===
Pos	Team	Pld	W	L	T	NR	BP	Pts	NRR
1	Western Storm	10	9	1	0	0	3	39	1.109
2	Loughborough Lightning	10	7	3	0	0	4	32	0.792
3	Southern Vipers	10	4	4	1	1	2	22	0.425
4	Yorkshire Diamonds	10	5	5	0	0	0	20	−0.456
5	Surrey Stars	10	3	6	0	1	2	16	−0.857
6	Lancashire Thunder	10	0	9	1	0	0	2	−1.194

Source: ESPN Cricinfo

Advanced to the Final.
Advanced to the Semi-final.

=== League stage ===
6 August 2019
19:00
Scorecard

Surrey Stars; 130/9 (20 overs)	v	Yorkshire Diamonds; 121 (19.5 overs)
Sarah Taylor 43 (34); Helen Fenby 4/20 (4 overs)		Alyssa Healy 31 (17); Laura Marsh 3/17 (4 overs)

Surrey Stars won by 9 runs
Headingley, Leeds
Umpires: Jeff Evans and Nick Cook
Player of the match: Laura Marsh (Surrey Stars)

- Surrey Stars won the toss and elected to bat.
- Points: Surrey Stars 4, Yorkshire Diamonds 0

8 August 2019
14:30
Scorecard

Lancashire Thunder; 120/7 (20 overs)	v	Surrey Stars; 124/2 (14.2 overs)
Harmanpreet Kaur 58* (47); Dane van Niekerk 3/20 (4 overs)		Lizelle Lee 66 (45); Emma Lamb 1/16 (2 overs)

Surrey Stars won by 8 wickets
Woodbridge Road, Guildford
Umpires: Mark Newell and Rob White
Player of the match: Lizelle Lee (Surrey Stars)

- Surrey Stars won the toss and elected to field.
- Points: Surrey Stars 5, Lancashire Thunder 0

12 August 2019
18:30
Scorecard

Surrey Stars	v	Southern Vipers

Match Abandoned
The Oval, London
Umpires: Peter Hartley and Jeremy Lloyds

- No toss.
- No play possible due to rain.
- Points: Surrey Stars 2, Southern Vipers 2

15 August 2019
14:30
Scorecard

Surrey Stars; 120/7 (20 overs)	v	Loughborough Lightning; 123/3 (14.5 overs)
Lizelle Lee 25 (21); Hayley Matthews 2/12 (4 overs)		Mignon du Preez 70* (41); Dane van Niekerk 1/16 (3 overs)

Loughborough Lightning won by 7 wickets
Woodbridge Road, Guildford
Umpires: Hassan Adnan and Chris Watts
Player of the match: Mignon du Preez (Loughborough Lightning)

- Loughborough Lightning won the toss and elected to field.
- Points: Loughborough Lightning 5, Surrey Stars 0

18 August 2019
14:30
Scorecard

Southern Vipers; 178/5 (20 overs)	v	Surrey Stars; 89 (16.4 overs)
Danni Wyatt 110 (60); Dane van Niekerk 3/31 (4 overs)		Sarah Taylor 19 (20); Stafanie Taylor 3/11 (3 overs)

Southern Vipers won by 89 runs
Arundel Castle Cricket Ground, Arundel
Umpires: Rob White and Mary Waldron
Player of the match: Danni Wyatt (Southern Vipers)

- Surrey Stars won the toss and elected to field.
- Points: Southern Vipers 5, Surrey Stars 0

20 August 2019
14:30
Scorecard

Surrey Stars; 121/6 (20 overs)	v	Yorkshire Diamonds; 124/5 (19.5 overs)
Marizanne Kapp 39* (39); Katie Levick 2/13 (4 overs)		Jemimah Rodrigues 42* (33); Laura Marsh 2/15 (2.5 overs)

Yorkshire Diamonds won by 5 wickets
Woodbridge Road, Guildford
Umpires: Hassan Adnan and Mary Waldron
Player of the match: Jemimah Rodrigues (Yorkshire Diamonds)

- Yorkshire Diamonds won the toss and elected to field.
- Points: Yorkshire Diamonds 4, Surrey Stars 0

21 August 2019
15:00
Scorecard

Western Storm; 159/8 (20 overs)	v	Surrey Stars; 155/8 (20 overs)
Rachel Priest 44 (16); Marizanne Kapp 1/8 (3 overs)		Sarah Taylor 73 (54); Deepti Sharma 3/18 (4 overs)

Western Storm won by 4 runs
County Ground, Taunton
Umpires: Neil Pratt and Ian Ramage
Player of the match: Sarah Taylor (Surrey Stars)

- Surrey Stars won the toss and elected to field.
- Points: Western Storm 4, Surrey Stars 0

23 August 2019
16:00
Scorecard

Surrey Stars; 147/7 (20 overs)	v	Loughborough Lightning; 150/5 (18.3 overs)
Nat Sciver 53 (35); Jenny Gunn 2/19 (4 overs)		Mignon du Preez 48 (25); Mady Villiers 1/6 (3 overs)

Loughborough Lightning won by 5 wickets
Haslegrave Ground, Loughborough
Umpires: Neil Pratt and Mary Waldron
Player of the match: Mignon du Preez (Loughborough Lightning)

- Surrey Stars won the toss and elected to bat.
- Loughborough Lightning 4, Surrey Stars 0

25 August 2019
14:30
Scorecard

Western Storm; 171/4 (20 overs)	v	Surrey Stars; 94 (17.5 overs)
Rachel Priest 89 (55); Dane van Niekerk 2/34 (4 overs)		Sarah Taylor 34 (29); Sonia Odedra 4/25 (3 overs)

Western Storm won by 77 runs
Woodbridge Road, Guildford
Umpires: Tom Lungley and Sue Redfern
Player of the match: Rachel Priest (Western Storm)

- Surrey Stars won the toss and elected to field.
- Points: Western Storm 5, Surrey Stars 0

28 August 2019
14:30
Scorecard

Surrey Stars; 132/1 (9 overs)	v	Lancashire Thunder; 97/7 (9 overs)
Lizelle Lee 75 (28); Kate Cross 1/42 (2 overs)		Tahlia McGrath 41 (18); Hannah Jones 3/24 (2 overs)

Surrey Stars won by 35 runs
Stanley Park, Blackpool
Umpires: Sue Redfern and Paul Baldwin
Player of the match: Lizelle Lee (Surrey Stars)

- Lancashire Thunder won the toss and elected to field.
- Match reduced to 9 overs per side due to rain
- Points: Surrey Stars 5, Lancashire Thunder 0

== Statistics ==
=== Batting ===
Player	Matches	Innings	NO	Runs	HS	Average	Strike rate	100s	50s	4s	6s
Aylish Cranstone	9	5	2	17	9	5.66	94.44	0	0	1	0
Gwenan Davies	4	2	0	1	1	0.50	33.33	0	0	0	0
Grace Gibbs	3	1	1	2	2*	–	100.00	0	0	0	0
Amy Gordon	7	2	1	3	3*	3.00	33.33	0	0	0	0
Eva Gray	5	2	0	8	4	4.00	200.00	0	0	2	0
Hannah Jones	2	1	0	4	4	4.00	133.33	0	0	1	0
Marizanne Kapp	9	7	1	101	39*	16.83	92.66	0	0	7	2
Lizelle Lee	9	9	0	213	75	23.66	148.95	0	2	30	7
Laura Marsh	8	7	3	21	9	5.25	53.84	0	0	1	0
Nat Sciver	9	9	2	233	53	33.28	120.72	0	2	28	5
Bryony Smith	9	8	0	73	20	9.12	110.60	0	0	12	1
Rhianna Southby	2	–	–	–	–	–	–	–	–	–	–
Sarah Taylor	8	8	2	260	73	43.33	120.93	0	2	35	0
Dane van Niekerk	8	7	0	97	32	13.85	85.20	0	0	7	3
Mady Villiers	7	6	2	28	13*	7.00	107.69	0	0	3	0
Source: ESPN Cricinfo

=== Bowling ===
Player	Matches	Innings	Overs	Maidens	Runs	Wickets	BBI	Average	Economy	Strike rate
Grace Gibbs	3	1	1.0	0	6	1	1/6	6.00	6.00	6.0
Amy Gordon	7	6	9.0	0	64	2	1/6	32.00	7.11	27.0
Eva Gray	5	2	3.0	0	47	1	1/33	47.00	15.66	18.0
Hannah Jones	2	1	2.0	0	24	3	3/24	8.00	12.00	4.0
Marizanne Kapp	9	9	29.0	2	155	4	1/8	38.75	5.34	43.5
Laura Marsh	8	8	27.5	0	229	10	3/17	22.90	8.22	16.7
Nat Sciver	9	9	28.0	0	239	7	3/37	34.14	8.53	24.0
Bryony Smith	9	5	9.0	0	78	2	2/8	39.00	8.66	27.0
Dane van Niekerk	8	8	30.2	0	211	12	3/20	17.58	6.95	15.1
Mady Villiers	7	7	22.5	0	166	5	1/6	33.20	7.27	27.4
Source: ESPN Cricinfo

=== Fielding ===
Player	Matches	Innings	Catches
Aylish Cranstone	9	9	2
Gwenan Davies	4	4	0
Grace Gibbs	3	3	0
Amy Gordon	7	7	0
Eva Gray	5	5	1
Hannah Jones	2	2	0
Marizanne Kapp	9	9	4
Lizelle Lee	9	9	3
Laura Marsh	8	8	2
Nat Sciver	9	9	3
Bryony Smith	9	9	2
Sarah Taylor	8	1	0
Dane van Niekerk	8	8	5
Mady Villiers	7	7	1
Source: ESPN Cricinfo

=== Wicket-keeping ===
Player	Matches	Innings	Catches	Stumpings
Rhianna Southby	2	2	0	2
Sarah Taylor	8	7	2	7
Source: ESPN Cricinfo
