= 2018 Surrey Stars season =

Surrey Stars
2018 season
- Coach: Richard Bedbrook
- Captain: Nat Sciver
- Overseas player: Marizanne Kapp; Lizelle Lee; Dane van Niekerk
- WCSL: Champions
- Most runs: Nat Sciver (362)
- Most wickets: Dane van Niekerk (13)
- Most catches: Nat Sciver (6)
- Most wicket-keeping dismissals: Sarah Taylor (6)

The 2018 season was Surrey Stars' third season, in which they competed in the Women's Cricket Super League, a Twenty20 competition. The side finished third in the group stage, winning 5 of their 10 matches, therefore progressing to the semi-final, where they played against Western Storm. They went on to beat Storm by 9 runs to advance to the final, where they faced group winners Loughborough Lightning. A century from Lizelle Lee ensured that the Stars beat Loughborough Lightning by 66 runs to claim their first WCSL title.

The side was captained by Nat Sciver and coached by Richard Bedbrook. They played three of their home matches at Woodbridge Road, Guildford and two at The Oval.

== Squad ==
Surrey Stars' 15-player squad is listed below. Ellen Burt was originally named in the squad, but was ruled out due to injury and replaced by Gayatri Gole. Grace Gibbs was ruled out of the squad during the tournament due to injury, and replaced by Amy Gordon. Age given is at the start of Surrey Stars' first match of the season (22 July 2018).

Name	Nationality	Birth date	Batting style	Bowling style	Notes
Batters
Aylish Cranstone	England	28 August 1994 (aged 23)	Left-handed	Left-arm medium	
Lizelle Lee	South Africa	2 April 1992 (aged 26)	Right-handed	Right-arm medium	Overseas player
All-rounders
Sophia Dunkley	England	16 July 1998 (aged 20)	Right-handed	Right-arm leg break	
Hannah Jones	England	21 July 1999 (aged 19)	Right-handed	Right-arm off break	
Marizanne Kapp	South Africa	4 January 1990 (aged 28)	Right-handed	Right arm medium	Overseas player
Nat Sciver	England	20 August 1992 (aged 25)	Right-handed	Right arm medium	Captain
Bryony Smith	England	12 December 1997 (aged 20)	Right-handed	Right-arm off break	
Dane van Niekerk	South Africa	14 May 1993 (aged 25)	Right-handed	Right-arm leg break	Overseas player
Wicket-keepers
Rhianna Southby	England	16 October 2000 (aged 17)	Right-handed	—	
Sarah Taylor	England	20 May 1989 (aged 29)	Right-handed	—	
Bowlers
Grace Gibbs	England	1 May 1995 (aged 23)	Right-handed	Right-arm medium	
Gayatri Gole	England	22 July 1998 (aged 20)	Right-handed	Right-arm medium	
Amy Gordon	England	3 October 2001 (aged 16)	Right-handed	Right-arm medium	Injury replacement player
Eva Gray	England	24 May 2000 (aged 18)	Right-handed	Right-arm medium	
Laura Marsh	England	5 December 1986 (aged 31)	Right-handed	Right arm off break	
Mady Villiers	England	26 August 1998 (aged 19)	Right-handed	Right-arm off break	

== Women's Cricket Super League ==
=== Season standings ===
Pos	Team	Pld	W	L	T	NR	BP	Pts	NRR
1	Loughborough Lightning	10	7	3	0	0	5	33	1.361
2	Western Storm	10	6	3	0	1	4	30	0.919
3	Surrey Stars	10	5	4	0	1	2	24	−0.404
4	Lancashire Thunder	10	5	5	0	0	1	21	−0.825
5	Yorkshire Diamonds	10	3	6	0	1	1	15	−0.290
6	Southern Vipers	10	2	7	0	1	0	10	−0.490

Source: ESPN Cricinfo

Advanced to the Final.
Advanced to the Semi-final.

=== League stage ===
22 July 2018
14:30
Scorecard

Surrey Stars; 141/9 (20 overs)	v	Southern Vipers; 145/3 (17 overs)
Sophia Dunkley 66 (43); Fi Morris 4/22 (4 overs)		Tammy Beaumont 62* (45); Marizanne Kapp 2/21 (4 overs)

Southern Vipers won by 7 wickets
Woodbridge Road, Guildford
Umpires: Sue Redfern and Mark Newell

- Southern Vipers won the toss and elected to field.
- Points: Southern Vipers 4, Surrey Stars 0

26 July 2018
14:30
Scorecard

Western Storm; 132/9 (20 overs)	v	Surrey Stars; 136/3 (15.5 overs)
Smriti Mandhana 37 (21); Sophia Dunkley 3/18 (2 overs)		Sarah Taylor 50 (34); Danielle Gibson 2/34 (4 overs)

Surrey Stars won by 7 wickets
College Ground, Cheltenham
Umpires: Sue Redfern and Mark Newell

- Surrey Stars won the toss and elected to field.
- Points: Surrey Stars 5, Western Storm 0

29 July 2018
14:30
Scorecard

Surrey Stars	v	Yorkshire Diamonds

Match Abandoned
Woodbridge Road, Guildford
Umpires: Mark Newell and Tom Lungley

- No toss.
- Points: Surrey Stars 2, Yorkshire Diamonds 2

31 July 2018
14:30
Scorecard

Surrey Stars; 148/5 (20 overs)	v	Lancashire Thunder; 151/5 (19.5 overs)
Nat Sciver 95 (57); Emma Lamb 3/34 (4 overs)		Nicole Bolton 87 (61); Nat Sciver 2/26 (4 overs)

Lancashire Thunder won by 5 wickets
The Oval, London
Umpires: Graham Lloyd and Nick Cook

- Lancashire Thunder won the toss and elected to field.
- Points: Lancashire Thunder 4, Surrey Stars 0

2 August 2018
14:30
Scorecard

Surrey Stars; 95 (18 overs)	v	Loughborough Lightning; 96/1 (10 overs)
Nat Sciver 45 (35); Kirstie Gordon 3/13 (4 overs)		Sophie Devine 61* (32); Marizanne Kapp 1/17 (4 overs)

Loughborough Lightning won by 9 wickets
Haslegrave Ground, Loughborough
Umpires: Chris Watts (Eng) and Rob White (Eng)

- Surrey Stars won the toss and elected to bat.
- Points: Loughborough Lightning 5, Surrey Stars 0

7 August 2018
14:30
Scorecard

Surrey Stars; 167/8 (20 overs)	v	Lancashire Thunder; 112 (19.2 overs)
Lizelle Lee 70 (37); Emma Lamb 2/12 (3 overs)		Evelyn Jones 40 (48); Dane van Niekerk 3/20 (4 overs)

Surrey Stars won by 55 runs
Old Trafford, Manchester
Umpires: Mike Burns and Jeff Evans
Player of the match: Lizelle Lee (Surrey Stars)

- Lancashire Thunder won the toss and elected to field.
- Points: Surrey Stars 5, Lancashire Thunder 0

9 August 2018
14:30
Scorecard

Loughborough Lightning; 100/7 (13 overs)	v	Surrey Stars; 106/3 (11.2 overs)
Georgia Elwiss 26 (21); Marizanne Kapp 1/4 (3 overs)		Lizelle Lee 48 (28); Georgia Elwiss 2/20 (2.2 overs)

Surrey Stars won by 7 wickets
Woodbridge Road, Guildford
Umpires: James Middlebrook and Rob White
Player of the match: Lizelle Lee (Surrey Stars)

- Surrey Stars won the toss and elected to field.
- Match reduced to 13 overs per side due to rain.
- Points: Surrey Stars 4, Loughborough Lightning 0

12 August 2018
14:30
Scorecard

Surrey Stars; 66 (16.4 overs)	v	Yorkshire Diamonds; 67/1 (9.3 overs)
Marizanne Kapp 13 (14); Beth Langston 3/14 (3.4 overs)		Beth Mooney 44* (30); Laura Marsh 1/20 (3 overs)

Yorkshire Diamonds won by 9 wickets
Clifton Park, York
Umpires: Sue Redfern and James Middlebrook
Player of the match: Beth Mooney (Yorkshire Diamonds)

- Yorkshire Diamonds won the toss and elected to field.
- Points: Yorkshire Diamonds 5, Surrey Stars 0

14 August 2018
14:30
Scorecard

Southern Vipers; 147/9 (20 overs)	v	Surrey Stars; 148/6 (19.3 overs)
Suzie Bates 82 (57); Nat Sciver 4/32 (4 overs)		Nat Sciver 46 (33); Suzie Bates 2/22 (4 overs)

Surrey Stars won by 4 wickets
County Ground, Hove
Umpires: Michael Gough and Sue Redfern
Player of the match: Nat Sciver (Surrey Stars)

- Surrey Stars won the toss and elected to field.
- Points: Surrey Stars 4, Southern Vipers 0

18 August 2018
14:30
Scorecard

Western Storm; 158/5 (20 overs)	v	Surrey Stars; 160/5 (19.4 overs)
Heather Knight 62 (47); Dane van Niekerk 2/20 (4 overs)		Lizelle Lee 48 (28); Heather Knight 1/18 (2 overs)

Surrey Stars won by 5 wickets
The Oval, London
Umpires: Nick Cook and Ian Gould
Player of the match: Lizelle Lee (Surrey Stars)

- Surrey Stars won the toss and elected to bat.
- Points: Surrey Stars 4, Western Storm 0

=== Semi-final ===
27 August 2018
12:00
Scorecard

Surrey Stars; 162/5 (20 overs)	v	Western Storm; 153/6 (20 overs)
Nat Sciver 72* (43); Heather Knight 1/16 (2 overs)		Fran Wilson 58* (45); Nat Sciver 2/21 (4 overs)

Surrey Stars won by 9 runs
County Ground, Hove
Umpires: Jeremy Lloyds and Neil Bainton
Player of the match: Nat Sciver (Surrey Stars)

- Western Storm won the toss and elected to field.

=== Final ===
27 August 2018
16:00
Scorecard

Surrey Stars; 183/6 (20 overs)	v	Loughborough Lightning; 117 (18.3 overs)
Lizelle Lee 104 (58); Georgia Elwiss 2/29 (4 overs)		Jenny Gunn 23* (21); Mady Villiers 3/22 (4 overs)

Surrey Stars won by 66 runs
County Ground, Hove
Umpires: Neil Bainton and Sue Redfern
Player of the match: Lizelle Lee (Surrey Stars)

- Loughborough Lightning won the toss and elected to field.

== Statistics ==
=== Batting ===
Player	Matches	Innings	NO	Runs	HS	Average	Strike rate	100s	50s	4s	6s
Aylish Cranstone	8	3	2	10	9	10.00	62.50	0	0	1	0
Sophia Dunkley	11	10	2	98	66	12.25	119.51	0	1	14	1
Grace Gibbs	6	3	2	12	8	12.00	66.66	0	0	1	0
Eva Gray	9	2	0	3	2	1.50	27.27	0	0	0	0
Hannah Jones	1	1	0	2	2	2.00	66.66	0	0	0	0
Marizanne Kapp	11	9	4	104	32*	20.80	122.35	0	0	9	2
Lizelle Lee	11	11	0	352	104	32.00	149.15	1	1	45	18
Laura Marsh	11	6	2	17	8	4.25	47.22	0	0	1	0
Nat Sciver	11	11	3	362	95*	45.25	143.65	0	2	43	4
Bryony Smith	11	11	0	147	39	13.36	90.74	0	0	20	2
Rhianna Southby	1	1	1	0	0*	–	–	0	0	0	0
Sarah Taylor	10	10	1	177	51	19.66	122.91	0	2	26	0
Dane van Niekerk	9	9	2	146	31	20.85	93.58	0	0	16	2
Mady Villiers	11	2	0	2	2	1.00	25.00	0	0	0	0
Source: ESPN Cricinfo

=== Bowling ===
Player	Matches	Innings	Overs	Maidens	Runs	Wickets	BBI	Average	Economy	Strike rate
Sophia Dunkley	11	8	18.0	0	144	6	3/18	24.00	8.00	18.0
Grace Gibbs	6	3	4.5	0	38	3	2/10	12.66	7.86	9.6
Eva Gray	9	5	8.3	0	68	0	–	–	8.00	–
Marizanne Kapp	11	11	36.2	0	206	11	2/14	18.72	5.66	19.8
Laura Marsh	11	10	37.2	0	275	8	2/28	34.37	7.36	28.0
Nat Sciver	11	11	34.0	1	280	10	4/32	28.00	8.23	20.4
Bryony Smith	11	3	6.1	0	47	3	2/9	15.66	7.62	12.3
Dane van Niekerk	9	9	29.0	0	192	13	3/20	14.76	6.62	13.3
Mady Villiers	11	6	13.0	0	90	5	3/22	18.00	6.92	15.6
Source: ESPN Cricinfo

=== Fielding ===
Player	Matches	Innings	Catches
Aylish Cranstone	8	8	1
Sophia Dunkley	11	11	3
Grace Gibbs	6	6	2
Eva Gray	9	9	0
Hannah Jones	1	1	0
Marizanne Kapp	11	11	4
Lizelle Lee	11	11	2
Laura Marsh	11	11	3
Nat Sciver	11	11	6
Bryony Smith	11	11	3
Dane van Niekerk	9	9	5
Mady Villiers	11	11	1
Source: ESPN Cricinfo

=== Wicket-keeping ===
Player	Matches	Innings	Catches	Stumpings
Rhianna Southby	1	1	0	0
Sarah Taylor	10	10	2	4
Source: ESPN Cricinfo
