= 2017 Surrey Stars season =

Surrey Stars
2017 season
- Coach: Richard Bedbrook
- Captain: Nat Sciver
- Overseas player: Rene Farrell; Marizanne Kapp; Lizelle Lee
- WCSL: 3rd
- Most runs: Marizanne Kapp (178)
- Most wickets: Nat Sciver (12)
- Most catches: Laura Marsh (4)
- Most wicket-keeping dismissals: Tammy Beaumont (7)

The 2017 season was Surrey Stars' second season, in which they competed in the Women's Cricket Super League, a Twenty20 competition. The side finished second in the group stage, winning four of their five matches, therefore progressing to the semi-final. However, they lost to eventual winners Western Storm in the semi-final by 3 wickets.

The side was captained by Nat Sciver and coached by Richard Bedbrook. They played their home matches at The Oval.

== Squad ==
Surrey Stars' 15-player squad is listed below. Age given is at the start of Surrey Stars' first match of the season (13 August 2017).

Name	Nationality	Birth date	Batting Style	Bowling Style	Notes
Batters
Aylish Cranstone	England	28 August 1994 (aged 22)	Left-handed	Left-arm medium	
Cordelia Griffith	England	19 September 1995 (aged 21)	Right-handed	Right-arm medium	
Lizelle Lee	South Africa	2 April 1992 (aged 25)	Right-handed	Right-arm medium	Overseas player
Kirstie White	England	14 March 1988 (aged 29)	Right-handed	Right-arm medium	
All-rounders
Naomi Dattani	England	28 April 1994 (aged 23)	Left-handed	Left-arm medium	
Sophia Dunkley	England	16 July 1998 (aged 19)	Right-handed	Right-arm leg break	
Hannah Jones	England	21 July 1999 (aged 18)	Right-handed	Right-arm off break	
Marizanne Kapp	South Africa	4 January 1990 (aged 27)	Right-handed	Right arm medium	Overseas player
Nat Sciver	England	20 August 1992 (aged 24)	Right-handed	Right arm medium	Captain
Bryony Smith	England	12 December 1997 (aged 19)	Right-handed	Right-arm off break	
Wicket-keepers
Tammy Beaumont	England	11 March 1991 (aged 26)	Right-handed	—	
Bowlers
Rene Farrell	Australia	13 January 1987 (aged 30)	Right-handed	Right arm medium	Overseas player
Grace Gibbs	England	1 May 1995 (aged 22)	Right-handed	Right-arm medium	
Alex Hartley	England	6 September 1993 (aged 23)	Right-handed	Slow left-arm orthodox	
Laura Marsh	England	5 December 1986 (aged 30)	Right-handed	Right arm off break	

== Women's Cricket Super League ==
=== Season standings ===
Pos	Team	Pld	W	L	T	NR	BP	Pts	NRR
1	Southern Vipers	5	4	1	0	0	4	20	2.001
2	Surrey Stars	5	4	1	0	0	2	18	0.291
3	Western Storm	5	3	2	0	0	0	12	−0.887
4	Loughborough Lightning	5	2	3	0	0	2	10	0.664
5	Yorkshire Diamonds	5	2	3	0	0	0	8	−0.318
6	Lancashire Thunder	5	0	5	0	0	0	0	−1.692

Source: ESPN Cricinfo

Advanced to the Final.
Advanced to the Semi-final.

=== League stage ===
13 August 2017
18:45 (D/N)
Scorecard

Yorkshire Diamonds; 100 (19.5 overs)	v	Surrey Stars; 104/2 (17.3 overs)
Suné Luus 29 (32); Alex Hartley 3/15 (4 overs)		Marizanne Kapp 48* (47); Katherine Brunt 1/12 (3.3 overs)

Surrey Stars won by 8 wickets
The Oval, London
Umpires: Neil Mallender and Tim Robinson
Player of the match: Marizanne Kapp (Surrey Stars)

- Yorkshire Diamonds won the toss and elected to bat.
- Points: Surrey Stars 4, Yorkshire Diamonds 0

16 August 2017
14:30
Scorecard

Surrey Stars; 133/6 (20 overs)	v	Lancashire Thunder; 100 (18 overs)
Nat Sciver 40* (36); Danielle Hazell 2/16 (4 overs)		Sarah Taylor 34 (30); Rene Farrell 5/26 (4 overs)

Surrey Stars won by 33 runs
Old Trafford, Manchester
Umpires: Neil Bainton and Graham Lloyd
Player of the match: Rene Farrell (Surrey Stars)

- Surrey Stars won the toss and elected to bat.
- Points: Surrey Stars 5, Lancashire Thunder 0

20 August 2017
14:30
Scorecard

Surrey Stars; 127/8 (20 overs)	v	Southern Vipers; 100/7 (16.2 overs)
Marizanne Kapp 42 (48); Hayley Matthews 2/23 (4 overs)		Suzie Bates 50* (41); Nat Sciver 3/28 (3.2 overs)

Surrey Stars won by 4 runs (DLS)
Rose Bowl, Southampton
Umpires: Mark Newell and Russell Warren
Player of the match: Marizanne Kapp (Surrey Stars)

- Surrey Stars won the toss and elected to bat.
- Southern Vipers innings curtailed at 16.2 overs due to rain.
- Southern Vipers' target at 16.2 overs was 105 runs to win.
- Points: Surrey Stars 4, Southern Vipers 0

23 August 2017
14:00
Scorecard

Surrey Stars; 169/6 (20 overs)	v	Western Storm; 117 (19.3 overs)
Lizelle Lee 72 (44); Claire Nicholas 3/20 (4 overs)		Alice Macleod 30 (29); Nat Sciver 3/11 (3.3 overs)

Surrey Stars won by 52 runs
The Oval, London
Umpires: Ian Blackwell and Chris Watts
Player of the match: Lizelle Lee (Surrey Stars)

- Western Storm won the toss and elected to field.
- Points: Surrey Stars 5, Western Storm 0

26 August 2017
14:30
Scorecard

Loughborough Lightning; 171/3 (20 overs)	v	Surrey Stars; 90 (18 overs)
Elyse Villani 71 (39); Laura Marsh 2/29 (4 overs)		Natalie Sciver 24 (18); Sarah Glenn 2/5 (3 overs)

Loughborough Lightning won by 81 runs
The Oval, London
Umpires: James Middlebrook and Paul Pollard
Player of the match: Ellyse Perry (Loughborough Lightning)

- Loughborough Lightning won the toss and elected to bat.
- Points: Loughborough Lightning 5, Surrey Stars 0

=== Semi-final ===
1 September 2017
14:15
Scorecard

Surrey Stars; 100/7 (20 overs)	v	Western Storm; 101/7 (18.5 overs)
Sophia Dunkley 30 (33); Anya Shrubsole 3/22 (4 overs)		Stafanie Taylor 37* (45); Marizanne Kapp 3/11 (4 overs)

Western Storm won by 3 wickets
County Ground, Hove
Umpires: David Millns and Martin Saggers
Player of the match: Stafanie Taylor (Western Storm)

- Surrey Stars won the toss and elected to bat.

== Statistics ==
=== Batting ===
Player	Matches	Innings	NO	Runs	HS	Average	Strike rate	100s	50s	4s	6s
Tammy Beaumont	6	6	0	71	36	11.83	88.75	0	0	12	0
Sophia Dunkley	6	5	0	70	30	14.00	100.00	0	0	7	0
Rene Farrell	6	4	2	10	7*	5.00	58.82	0	0	1	0
Grace Gibbs	6	2	1	10	9	10.00	100.00	0	0	0	1
Alex Hartley	6	1	0	0	0	0.00	0.00	0	0	0	0
Hannah Jones	5	1	1	9	9*	–	75.00	0	0	1	0
Marizanne Kapp	6	6	1	178	48*	35.60	90.81	0	0	20	0
Lizelle Lee	5	5	0	123	72	24.60	136.66	0	1	17	6
Laura Marsh	6	5	1	26	11	6.50	74.28	0	0	3	0
Nat Sciver	6	6	2	154	40*	38.50	120.31	0	0	18	1
Bryony Smith	6	6	1	25	13	5.00	52.08	0	0	0	0
Kirstie White	2	1	0	5	5	5.00	83.33	0	0	0	0
Source: ESPN Cricinfo

=== Bowling ===
Player	Matches	Innings	Overs	Maidens	Runs	Wickets	BBI	Average	Economy	Strike rate
Rene Farrell	6	6	22.0	0	134	8	5/26	16.75	6.09	16.5
Alex Hartley	6	6	23.5	0	173	9	3/15	19.22	7.25	15.8
Marizanne Kapp	6	6	20.5	2	103	6	3/11	17.16	4.94	20.8
Laura Marsh	6	6	24.0	2	126	9	2/12	14.00	5.25	16.0
Nat Sciver	6	6	21.5	1	141	12	3/11	11.75	6.45	10.9
Source: ESPN Cricinfo

=== Fielding ===
Player	Matches	Innings	Catches
Sophia Dunkley	6	6	1
Rene Farrell	6	6	3
Grace Gibbs	6	6	1
Alex Hartley	6	6	2
Hannah Jones	5	5	0
Marizanne Kapp	6	6	0
Lizelle Lee	5	5	3
Laura Marsh	6	6	4
Nat Sciver	6	6	2
Bryony Smith	6	6	3
Kirstie White	2	2	0
Source: ESPN Cricinfo

=== Wicket-keeping ===
Player	Matches	Innings	Catches	Stumpings
Tammy Beaumont	6	6	5	2
Source: ESPN Cricinfo
