= 2016 Women's Cricket Super League =

- Dates: 30 July 2016 – 21 August 2016
- Administrator: England and Wales Cricket Board
- Cricket format: Twenty20
- Tournament format(s): Round robin and knockout finals
- Champions: Southern Vipers (1st title)
- Participants: 6
- Matches: 17
- Attendance: 15,465 (910 per match)
- Player of the series: Stafanie Taylor
- Most runs: Stafanie Taylor (289)
- Most wickets: Stafanie Taylor (11)

The 2016 Women's Cricket Super League, or 2016 Kia Super League for sponsorship reasons, was the first season of the Women's Cricket Super League (WCSL), a semi-professional women's cricket competition in England and Wales. The competition, run by the England and Wales Cricket Board (ECB), consisted of six franchise teams playing in a Twenty20 format. Each team featured three or four players contracted to the England women's cricket team and three overseas international players. Three teams qualified from the league stage of the competition; the Southern Vipers went directly into the final, while the Loughborough Lightning and Western Storm met in a semi-final.

The Southern Vipers became the first WCSL champions, defeating Western Storm by seven wickets in the final. Stafanie Taylor, a West Indian overseas player for the Western Storm, was named as player of the tournament, after she finished as both the leading run-scorer and leading wicket-taker in the competition.

== Competition format ==
Six teams competed for the T20 title which took place between 30 July and 21 August 2016. The six teams played each other once in a round robin format; followed by a finals day at the County Cricket Ground, Chelmsford. The team that finished top of the table during the group stage qualified directly for the final, while the teams in second and third qualified for a semi-final. Both the semi-final and the final were played on the same day at the same ground. This was a change in format from the original proposal, in which the top four team qualified for the semi-finals. During the group stage, teams scored two points for a win, but gained an additional bonus point if they scored at a run rate 1.25 or more times that of their opponent.

== Teams ==
Location of WCSL teams

Each team named a squad of 15 players, which included three overseas players and three or four England team players. The remaining squad positions comprised England academy players and a selection of other English domestic cricketers. A number of changes were made to the squads; before they were even officially announced, the Lancashire Thunder had to find a replacement for Jess Jonassen, who withdrew due to injury. In June, a month and a half before the tournament started, two further overseas players withdrew from the tournament. Megan Schutt was unable to play for the Southern Vipers due to a knee injury, and was replaced in the team by the New Zealand international Morna Nielsen, while Sarah Coyte withdrew for personal reasons, and was replaced in the Lancashire Thunder side by Amy Satterthwaite. The Lancashire Thunder suffered further disruption in the weeks leading up to the competition, when Sarah Taylor, who was initially named as their captain, confirmed that she would not take part in the tournament while she took a break from cricket to deal with anxiety and panic attacks. Amy Satterthwaite was named as captain in her place. Another late change was necessitated by a shoulder injury to Meg Lanning, with Lea Tahuhu replacing her in the Surrey Stars squad.

Team	Home ground(s)	Coach	Captain	England players	Overseas players
Lancashire Thunder	Old Trafford, Manchester; Stanley Park, Blackpool	Stephen Titchard	Amy Satterthwaite	Kate Cross; Sarah Taylor; Danielle Wyatt	Deandra Dottin (WIN); Hayley Matthews (WIN) (Note: Hayley Matthews replaced Jess Jonassen in the Lancashire Thunder squad.); Amy Satterthwaite (NZL) (Note: Amy Satterthwaite replaced Sarah Coyte in the Lancashire Thunder squad.)
Loughborough Lightning	Haslegrave Ground, Loughborough	Salliann Briggs	Georgia Elwiss	Georgia Elwiss; Rebecca Grundy; Amy Jones; Beth Langston	Sophie Devine (NZL); Ellyse Perry (AUS); Dane van Niekerk (RSA)
Southern Vipers	Ageas Bowl, Southampton	Nicholas Denning	Charlotte Edwards	Charlotte Edwards; Natasha Farrant; Lydia Greenway	Suzie Bates (NZL); Sara McGlashan (NZL); Morna Nielsen (NZL) (Note: Morna Nielsen replaced Megan Schutt in the Southern Vipers squad.)
Surrey Stars	The Oval, London; Woodbridge Road, Guildford	Richard Bedbrook	Natalie Sciver	Tammy Beaumont; Laura Marsh; Natalie Sciver	Rene Farrell (AUS); Marizanne Kapp (RSA); Lea Tahuhu (NZL) (Note: Lea Tahuhu replaced Meg Lanning in the Surrey Stars squad.)
Western Storm	County Ground, Taunton; Nevil Road, Bristol	Caroline Foster	Heather Knight	Heather Knight; Anya Shrubsole; Fran Wilson	Lizelle Lee (RSA); Rachel Priest (NZL); Stafanie Taylor (WIN)
Yorkshire Diamonds	Headingley, Leeds	Rich Pyrah	Lauren Winfield	Katherine Brunt; Jenny Gunn; Danielle Hazell; Lauren Winfield	Alex Blackwell (AUS); Beth Mooney (AUS); Shabnim Ismail (RSA)

== Tournament summary ==
=== League stage ===
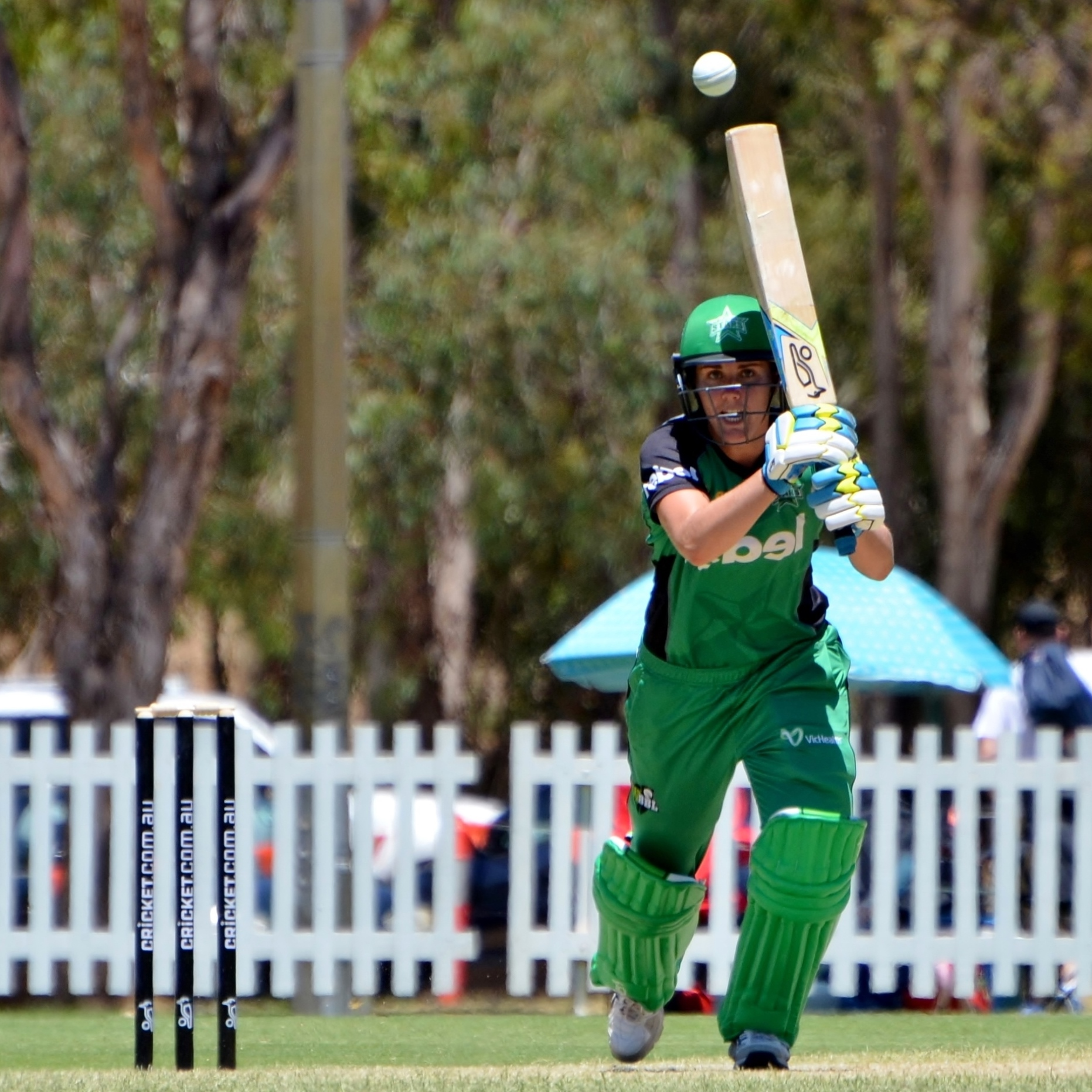
During the group stage, Nat Sciver scored 90* during one match for the Surrey Stars.

The tournament began on 30 July at Headingley in Leeds, where the Loughborough Lightning faced the Yorkshire Diamonds. The Lightning batted first and scored 128 for nine, led by 52 runs from their New Zealand international, Sophie Devine. The Diamonds began their response well, and their captain, Lauren Winfield scored 23 runs from just 13 balls before she was run out. There was some controversy regarding the dismissal; Winfield felt that she had been impeded by the bowler, but the umpires upheld the dismissal. Regular wickets and miserly bowling from the Lightning attack restricted Yorkshire's batsmen, and they were eventually all out for 85, giving the Lightning a 43-run victory. The following day saw two low-scoring matches; the Surrey Stars were restricted to 85 runs from their 20 overs by an economic Southern Vipers bowling attack. Nat Sciver managed to score 36 runs for the Stars late in the innings, but the Vipers scored 66 runs from their opening partnership, including 41 runs from 43 balls for Georgia Adams to help them towards their target. They won with six wickets and 28 balls to spare. In the other fixture that day, the Lancashire Thunder reached 65 for four, but then a spell of bowling from Heather Knight and Stafanie Taylor for the Western Storm saw the Thunder dismissed all out for 83 runs. Taylor finished with four wickets, while Knight took three. In their batting response, Knight and Taylor were again the best performers; Knight scored 23 and Taylor 14 as the Storm chased down the total with 27 balls remaining.

The Lancashire Thunder took on the Loughborough Lightning in the fourth match of the tournament, and the two teams combined to score over 300 runs. Amy Satterthwaite scored a rapid 52 runs from 32 balls for the Thunder to help them reach 164 for eight. A combination of good bowling from the Thunder bowlers, and some poor run outs hindered the Lightning's batting. Sophie Ecclestone took three wickets with her spin bowling as the Lightning collapsed to 77 for eight. A partnership of 69 runs between Thea Brookes and Paige Scholfield gave Loughborough a chance at chasing down the total, but late wickets for Hayley Matthews saw Lancashire win by six runs. The next day, Yorkshire batted first against Surrey and scored 134 for five, largely due to runs from Hollie Armitage (43) and Lauren Winfield (29). Surrey's Alex Hartley was the pick of the bowlers, taking two wickets and restricting the Diamonds to 18 runs from her four overs. In their reply, Tammy Beaumont, Bryony Smith and Nat Sciver all made good starts to help their side chase down the total and give the Stars a six wicket victory with 11 balls remaining. Lancashire Thunder hosted the Southern Vipers in their third match of the tournament. The Vipers batted first and scored 132 for 4, helped by a score of 54 not out from Sara McGlashan. The Thunder lost Matthews from the fourth ball of their batting innings, but then recovered with a 57-run second wicket partnership between Satterthwaite and Emma Lamb. The pair were dismissed two overs apart, and Lancashire failed to score the runs they needed, falling 11 runs short of the Vipers' total.

A fourth-wicket partnership of 83 runs between Amy Jones and Ellyse Perry rescued Loughborough from 31 for three against the Western Storm, and they posted 158 for eight. Storm's captain, Heather Knight, scored 74 runs in the chase, but received little batting support from her teammates. After Knight was run out, the Storm faltered to eventually lose the game by five runs. Western Storm were in action again two days later, when they hosted the Stars in Bristol. The Stars batted first and scored 161 for six, propelled by an innings of 90 not out from Nat Sciver. In their chase, Stafanie Taylor scored 74 not out, and Lizelle Lee got 53 to help the Storm to victory. In Southampton the next day, the Southern Vipers beat the Diamonds by 54 runs; Suzie Bates and Arran Brindle each scored 45 runs for the hosts, and Linsey Smith then took four wickets to help bowl the Diamonds out for 64. Only Beth Mooney reached double figures for the Diamonds. A strong bowling performance from Alex Hartley and Marizanne Kapp helped Surrey to limit Lancashire to 102 for nine in the next match, with the pair both bowling economically and taking five wickets between them. The Stars chased down the target with more than four overs remaining; Tammy Beaumont scored 45, and Bryony Smith made 30.

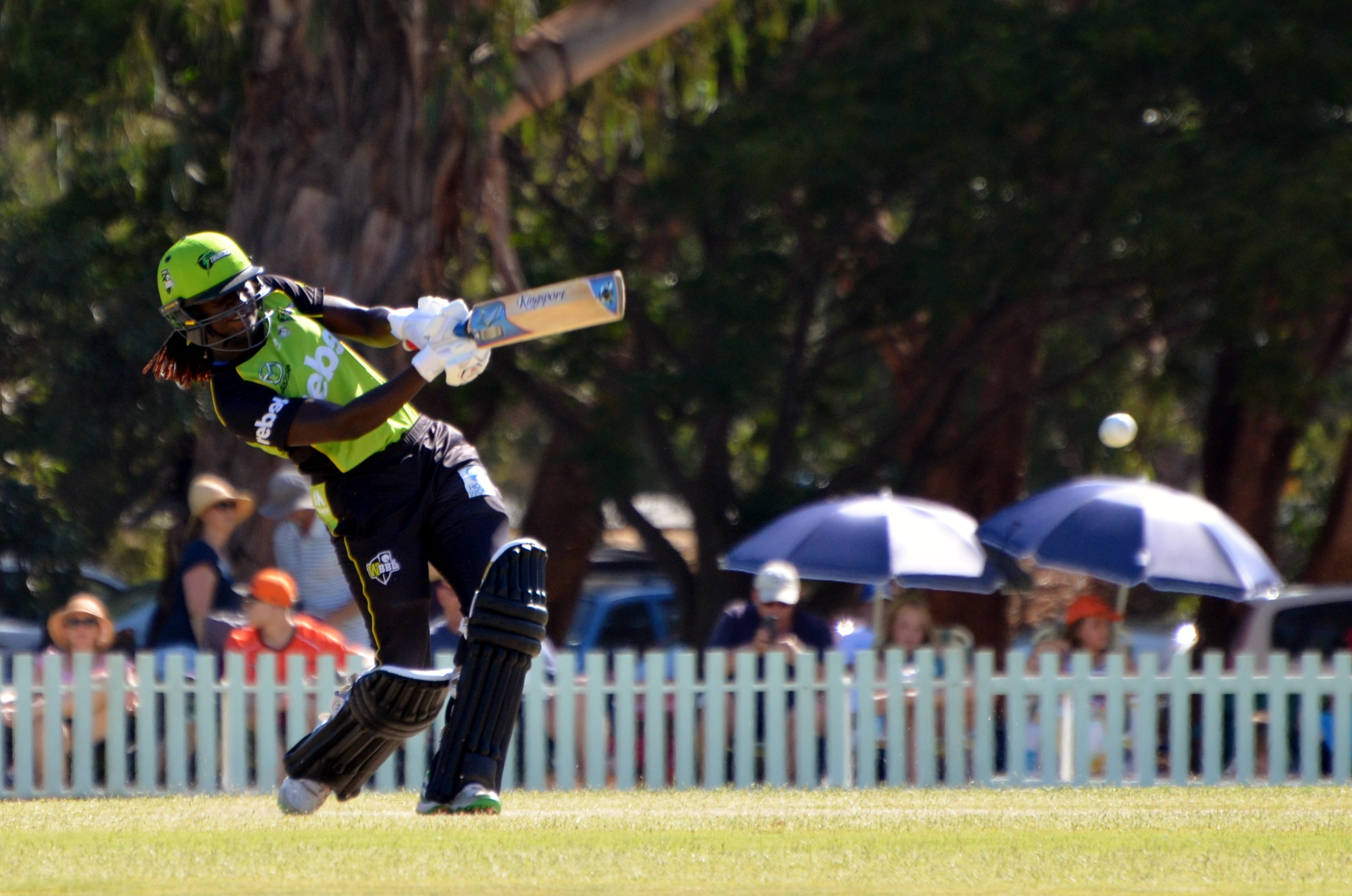
Stafanie Taylor scored 78* for Western Storm in the penultimate round to help them reach the semi-final.

In the penultimate round of matches, Dane van Niekerk made the highest score of the competition, 91 runs, to propel the Loughborough Lightning to 168 for 6, the highest team total of the tournament. During the Surrey Stars' response, van Niekerk was also one of three bowlers to take two wickets to help limit the Stars to 134 runs, and secure the Lightning a place at finals days. The Vipers travelled to Taunton unbeaten before their match against the Western Storm. Batting first, the Vipers reached 137 for 3; Suzie Bates scored 57 runs and Charlotte Edwards got 30. In their reply, the Western Storm lost Rachel Priest early, but two big partnership involving Stafanie Taylor, who scored 78 not out, helped them to victory with 13 balls remaining. The final match of the day pitted the two northern sides against each other in the women's 'Roses' match. Yorkshire batted first in Manchester and scored 166; Alex Blackwell got 59 runs, and a slow over-rate meant that Yorkshire received six additional runs before the final over. In Lancashire's chase, Danielle Hazell took four wickets, and Katherine Brunt took a hat-trick to bowl the Thunder out for 71 runs. That meant that Yorkshire and Lancashire had each won once during the tournament, and irrespective of results in the last round of group matches, neither could qualify for finals day; both the Southern Vipers and Western Storm would join the Loughborough Lightning.

The last round of matches, featuring all three of the teams that had qualified for finals day, determined who went directly to the final, and who would face off first in the semi-final. The Southern Vipers faced the Loughborough Lightning, and batting first a team effort saw them reach 156 for 4; Bates scored 38, Sara McGlashan got 34* and Lydia Greenway 29. Despite scores in the thirties from Perry and Evelyn Jones, a strong bowling performance from the Vipers, in which Linsey Smith and Brindle each took three wickets, saw them to victory by 59 runs. That victory guaranteed the Vipers a place in the final, while the Loughborough Lightning had to face Western Storm in a semi-final. The result of the other match that day was of no consequence to the tournament; Beth Mooney scored 56 runs for the Yorkshire Diamonds, who scored 118 runs. Anya Shrubsole finished the match with five wickets for the Western Storm, taking a four–wicket maiden in the final over of the match. Storm opening batsmen Taylor and Priest shared a 101-run partnership to take their side to the brink of victory before being dismissed from subsequent deliveries, but despite two further wickets, the Storm won by six wickets with 21 balls remaining.

=== Semi-final ===
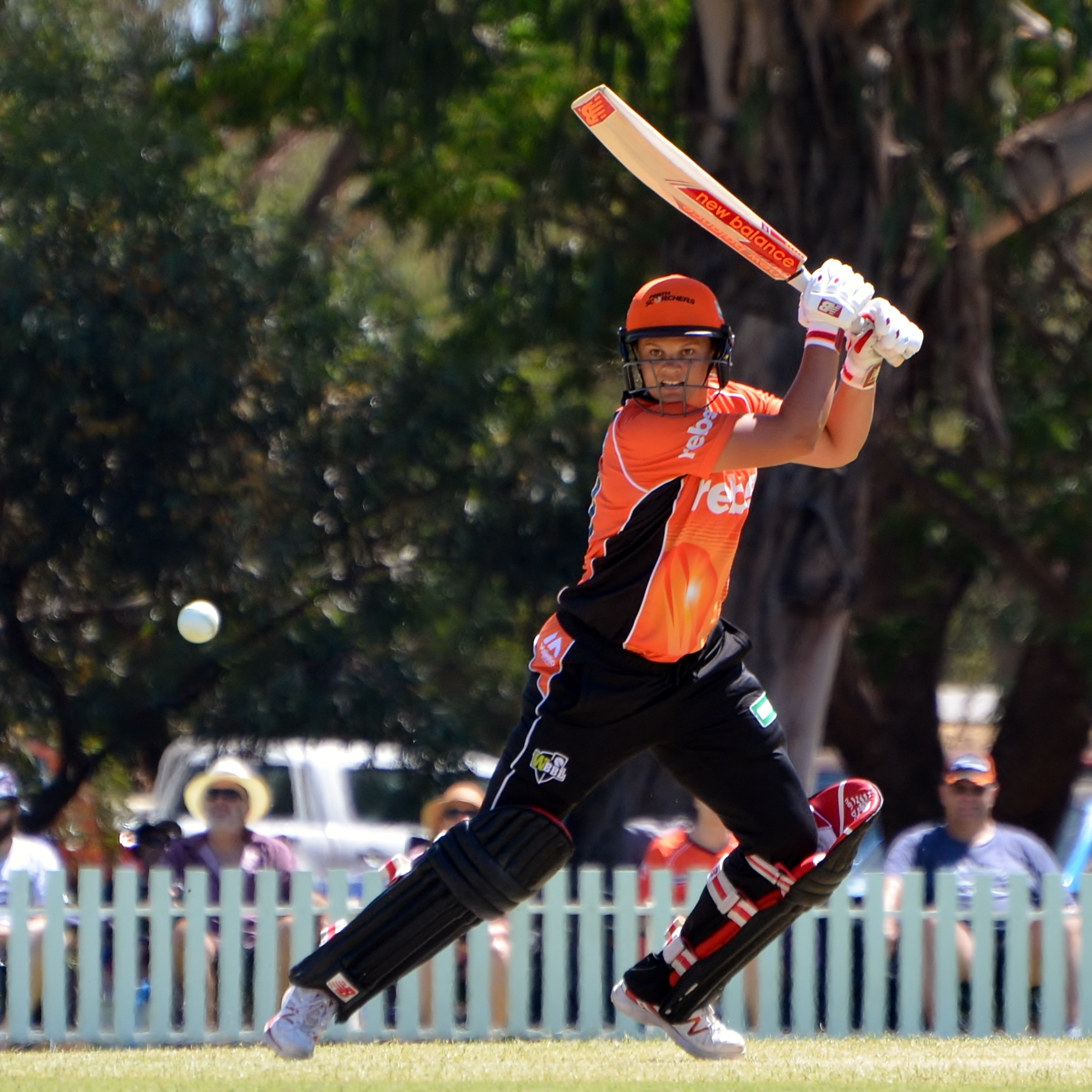
Suzie Bates scored 52 runs to help the Southern Vipers to victory in the final.

The first match of the women's finals day, the Western Storm won the toss and decided to bowl first against the Loughborough Lightning. The Lightning scored 21 runs from the first four overs, before Stafanie Taylor struck twice in the fifth over, dismissing both openers; van Niekerk for 14, and Georgia Elwiss for 6. A 58-run partnership between Ellyse Perry and Sophie Devine ensued, though neither scored that quickly. The scoring-rate slowed further after Devine's dismissal for 21 runs, but a late surge from Perry and Thea Brookes helped Loughborough reach 124 for seven. Taylor finished the innings with three wickets, while Shrubsole and Dibble were both relatively economical, both going for five-runs per over or less. Beginning their chase, the Storm lost Priest early, bowled by van Niekerk for four runs. Taylor and Knight then shared a 57-run partnership before van Niekerk took the wicket of Taylor for 34. Knight remained in place, reaching a half-century before being dismissed in the final over, with the scores level. Georgia Hennessy came in, and struck four runs from her only ball to secure the victory, and a place in the final, for the Western Storm.

=== Final ===
Played at Chelmsford after the semi-final, Vipers' captain Charlotte Edwards won the toss and elected to bowl first. The Western Storm opening batsmen, Stafanie Taylor and Rachel Priest started well, propelling the score to 71 without loss after ten overs. In the subsequent over, Arran Brindle dismissed Taylor for 35, and her miserly bowling helped to slow the Storm's scoring. Heather Knight and Priest got out soon after one another, scoring 6 and 57 respectively, before the Storm's middle-order batsmen; Fran Wilson (16*), Lizelle Lee (6), Sophie Luff (2) and Georgia Hennessy (9*), added a few more runs to bring their total to 140 from 20 overs. Brindle and Tash Farrant were the pick of the bowlers, both conceding less than five runs per over.

In their response, the Vipers' openers put on 78 runs together in just under 10 overs, before Edwards was dismissed for 24, bowled by Jodie Dibble. Suzie Bates was run out by Fran Wilson soon after for 52 from 46 balls. Georgia Adams added 15 runs before she was also run out, by Anya Shrubsole. Another good partnership, between Sara McGlashan (21*) and Lydia Greenway (17*), took the Vipers to their target with seven balls to spare. Taylor, who was named as player of the tournament, was the most effective bowler for the Storm, but even she could only limit the Vipers to six runs per over.

== Results ==
=== League stage ===
Points table
Pos	Team	Pld	W	L	T	NR	BP	Pts	NRR
1	Southern Vipers (F)	5	4	1	0	0	3	11	1.437
2	Western Storm (SF)	5	4	1	0	0	1	9	0.838
3	Loughborough Lightning (SF)	5	3	2	0	0	2	8	0.170
4	Surrey Stars	5	2	3	0	0	1	5	−0.274
5	Yorkshire Diamonds	5	1	4	0	0	1	3	−0.362
6	Lancashire Thunder	5	1	4	0	0	0	2	−1.724

Notes:
Team marked (F) qualified directly for the final.
Teams marked (SF) qualified for the semi-final.

30 July	Loughborough Lightning; 128/9 (20 overs)	v	Yorkshire Diamonds; 85 (17.1 overs)	Loughborough Lightning won by 43 runs
14:30; Scorecard	Loughborough Lightning; 128/9 (20 overs)	v	Yorkshire Diamonds; 85 (17.1 overs)	Headingley, Leeds; Umpires: Ben Debenham and Tom Lungley
14:30; Scorecard	Sophie Devine 52 (38); Jenny Gunn 2/20 (4 overs)		Lauren Winfield 23 (13); Rebecca Grundy 3/21 (4 overs)	Headingley, Leeds; Umpires: Ben Debenham and Tom Lungley
Loughborough Lightning won the toss and elected to bat.; Points: Loughborough Lightning 3, Yorkshire Diamonds 0				Headingley, Leeds; Umpires: Ben Debenham and Tom Lungley

31 July	Surrey Stars; 85/6 (20 overs)	v	Southern Vipers; 88/4 (15.2 overs)	Southern Vipers won by 6 wickets
14:00; Scorecard	Surrey Stars; 85/6 (20 overs)	v	Southern Vipers; 88/4 (15.2 overs)	Rose Bowl, Southampton; Umpires: Ian Blackwell and Paul Pollard
14:00; Scorecard	Nat Sciver 36 (44); Tash Farrant 2/17 (4 overs)		Georgia Adams 41 (43); Alex Hartley 2/17 (4 overs)	Rose Bowl, Southampton; Umpires: Ian Blackwell and Paul Pollard
Surrey Stars won the toss and elected to bat.; Points: Southern Vipers 3, Surrey Stars 0				Rose Bowl, Southampton; Umpires: Ian Blackwell and Paul Pollard

31 July	Lancashire Thunder; 83 (18.3 overs)	v	Western Storm; 86/6 (15.3 overs)	Western Storm won by 4 wickets
14:30; Scorecard	Lancashire Thunder; 83 (18.3 overs)	v	Western Storm; 86/6 (15.3 overs)	County Ground, Taunton; Umpires: Russell Warren and Chris Watts
14:30; Scorecard	Emma Lamb 25 (27); Heather Knight 3/11 (4 overs)		Heather Knight 23 (25); Deandra Dottin 3/8 (3 overs)	County Ground, Taunton; Umpires: Russell Warren and Chris Watts
Lancashire Thunder won the toss and elected to bat.; Points: Western Storm 3, Lancashire Thunder 0				County Ground, Taunton; Umpires: Russell Warren and Chris Watts

3 August	Lancashire Thunder; 164/8 (20 overs)	v	Loughborough Lightning; 158 (19.5 overs)	Lancashire Thunder won by 6 runs
16:30 (D/N); Scorecard	Lancashire Thunder; 164/8 (20 overs)	v	Loughborough Lightning; 158 (19.5 overs)	Haslegrave Ground, Loughborough; Umpires: Ian Blackwell and Russell Warren
16:30 (D/N); Scorecard	Amy Satterthwaite 52 (32); Georgia Elwiss 2/37 (4 overs)		Paige Scholfield 38 (22); Sophie Ecclestone 3/23 (4 overs)	Haslegrave Ground, Loughborough; Umpires: Ian Blackwell and Russell Warren
Loughborough Lightning won the toss and elected to bowl.; Points: Lancashire Thunder 2, Loughborough Lightning 0				Haslegrave Ground, Loughborough; Umpires: Ian Blackwell and Russell Warren

4 August	Yorkshire Diamonds; 134/5 (20 overs)	v	Surrey Stars; 135/4 (18.1 overs)	Surrey Stars won by 6 wickets
18:30 (D/N); Scorecard	Yorkshire Diamonds; 134/5 (20 overs)	v	Surrey Stars; 135/4 (18.1 overs)	The Oval, London; Umpires: Ian Blackwell and Russell Warren
18:30 (D/N); Scorecard	Hollie Armitage 43 (36); Alex Hartley 2/18 (4 overs)		Tammy Beaumont 47 (45); Jenny Gunn 2/19 (4 overs)	The Oval, London; Umpires: Ian Blackwell and Russell Warren
Yorkshire Diamonds won the toss and elected to bat.; Points: Surrey Stars 2, Yorkshire Diamonds 0				The Oval, London; Umpires: Ian Blackwell and Russell Warren

5 August	Southern Vipers; 132/4 (20 overs)	v	Lancashire Thunder; 121/7 (20 overs)	Southern Vipers won by 11 runs
14:30; Scorecard	Southern Vipers; 132/4 (20 overs)	v	Lancashire Thunder; 121/7 (20 overs)	Stanley Park, Blackpool; Umpires: Tom Lungley and Paul Pollard
14:30; Scorecard	Sara McGlashan 54 (50); Hayley Matthews 2/16 (4 overs)		Emma Lamb 34 (35); Morna Nielsen 2/16 (4 overs)	Stanley Park, Blackpool; Umpires: Tom Lungley and Paul Pollard
Southern Vipers won the toss and elected to bat.; Points: Southern Vipers 2, Lancashire Thunder 0				Stanley Park, Blackpool; Umpires: Tom Lungley and Paul Pollard

5 August	Loughborough Lightning; 158/8 (20 overs)	v	Western Storm; 153/5 (20 overs)	Loughborough Lightning won by 5 runs
16:30 (D/N); Scorecard	Loughborough Lightning; 158/8 (20 overs)	v	Western Storm; 153/5 (20 overs)	Haslegrave Ground, Loughborough; Umpires: Ben Debenham and Russell Warren
16:30 (D/N); Scorecard	Amy Jones 46 (30); Anya Shrubsole 2/26 (4 overs)		Heather Knight 74 (46); Sonia Odedra 2/20 (4 overs)	Haslegrave Ground, Loughborough; Umpires: Ben Debenham and Russell Warren
Loughborough Lightning won the toss and elected to bat.; Points: Loughborough Lightning 2, Western Storm 0				Haslegrave Ground, Loughborough; Umpires: Ben Debenham and Russell Warren

7 August	Surrey Stars; 161/6 (20 overs)	v	Western Storm; 165/5 (19.4 overs)	Western Storm won by 5 wickets
14:30; Scorecard	Surrey Stars; 161/6 (20 overs)	v	Western Storm; 165/5 (19.4 overs)	County Ground, Bristol; Umpires: Ben Debenham and Chris Watts
14:30; Scorecard	Nat Sciver 90* (45); Freya Davies 2/38 (4 overs)		Stafanie Taylor 74* (48); Nat Sciver 2/17 (4 overs)	County Ground, Bristol; Umpires: Ben Debenham and Chris Watts
Surrey Stars won the toss and elected to bat.; Points: Western Storm 2, Surrey Stars 0				County Ground, Bristol; Umpires: Ben Debenham and Chris Watts

8 August	Southern Vipers; 118/4 (20 overs)	v	Yorkshire Diamonds; 64 (16.3 overs)	Southern Vipers won by 54 runs
14:30; Scorecard	Southern Vipers; 118/4 (20 overs)	v	Yorkshire Diamonds; 64 (16.3 overs)	Rose Bowl, Southampton; Umpires: Ben Debenham and Chris Watts
14:30; Scorecard	Suzie Bates 45* (45); Katherine Brunt 2/26 (4 overs)		Beth Mooney 17 (23); Linsey Smith 4/10 (4 overs)	Rose Bowl, Southampton; Umpires: Ben Debenham and Chris Watts
Southern Vipers won the toss and elected to bat.; Points: Southern Vipers 3, Yorkshire Diamonds 0				Rose Bowl, Southampton; Umpires: Ben Debenham and Chris Watts

9 August	Lancashire Thunder; 102/9 (20 overs)	v	Surrey Stars; 106/3 (15.2 overs)	Surrey Stars won by 7 wickets
14:30; Scorecard	Lancashire Thunder; 102/9 (20 overs)	v	Surrey Stars; 106/3 (15.2 overs)	Woodbridge Road, Guildford; Umpires: Tom Lungley and Russell Warren
14:30; Scorecard	Amy Satterthwaite 34* (43); Alex Hartley 3/11 (4 overs)		Tammy Beaumont 45* (36); Deandra Dottin 1/13 (2 overs)	Woodbridge Road, Guildford; Umpires: Tom Lungley and Russell Warren
Surrey Stars won the toss and elected to field.; Points: Surrey Stars 3, Lancashire Thunder 0				Woodbridge Road, Guildford; Umpires: Tom Lungley and Russell Warren

12 August	Loughborough Lightning; 168/6 (20 overs)	v	Surrey Stars; 134 (19.5 overs)	Loughborough Lightning won by 34 runs
16:30 (D/N); Scorecard	Loughborough Lightning; 168/6 (20 overs)	v	Surrey Stars; 134 (19.5 overs)	Haslegrave Ground, Loughborough; Umpires: Paul Pollard and Russell Warren
16:30 (D/N); Scorecard	Dane van Niekerk 91 (64); Lea Tahuhu 1/9 (1 over)		Laura Marsh 41 (24); Sophie Devine 2/12 (2.5 overs)	Haslegrave Ground, Loughborough; Umpires: Paul Pollard and Russell Warren
Surrey Stars won the toss and elected to field.; Points: Loughborough Lightning 3, Surrey Stars 0				Haslegrave Ground, Loughborough; Umpires: Paul Pollard and Russell Warren

12 August	Southern Vipers; 137/3 (20 overs)	v	Western Storm; 140/2 (17.5 overs)	Western Storm won by 8 wickets
17:30 (D/N); Scorecard	Southern Vipers; 137/3 (20 overs)	v	Western Storm; 140/2 (17.5 overs)	County Ground, Taunton; Umpires: Ian Blackwell and Tom Lungley
17:30 (D/N); Scorecard	Suzie Bates 57 (50); Heather Knight 2/27 (4 overs)		Stafanie Taylor 78* (51); Fi Morris 1/10 (1 over)	County Ground, Taunton; Umpires: Ian Blackwell and Tom Lungley
Southern Vipers won the toss and elected to bat.; Points: Western Storm 2, Southern Vipers 0				County Ground, Taunton; Umpires: Ian Blackwell and Tom Lungley

12 August	Yorkshire Diamonds; 166/6 (20 overs)	v	Lancashire Thunder; 71 (15 overs)	Yorkshire Diamonds won by 95 runs
18:00 (D/N); Scorecard	Yorkshire Diamonds; 166/6 (20 overs)	v	Lancashire Thunder; 71 (15 overs)	Old Trafford, Manchester; Umpires: Ben Debenham and Chris Watts
18:00 (D/N); Scorecard	Alex Blackwell 59 (42); Hayley Matthews 1/21 (4 overs)		Deandra Dottin 25 (24); Danielle Hazell 4/10 (4 overs)	Old Trafford, Manchester; Umpires: Ben Debenham and Chris Watts
Yorkshire Diamonds won the toss and elected to bat.; Points: Yorkshire Diamonds 3, Lancashire Thunder 0				Old Trafford, Manchester; Umpires: Ben Debenham and Chris Watts

14 August	Southern Vipers; 156/4 (20 overs)	v	Loughborough Lightning; 97 (18.5 overs)	Southern Vipers won by 59 runs
14:00; Scorecard	Southern Vipers; 156/4 (20 overs)	v	Loughborough Lightning; 97 (18.5 overs)	Rose Bowl, Southampton; Umpires: Ben Debenham and Tom Lungley
14:00; Scorecard	Suzie Bates 38 (24); Rebecca Grundy 2/24 (4 overs)		Ellyse Perry 35 (33); Linsey Smith 3/16 (4 overs)	Rose Bowl, Southampton; Umpires: Ben Debenham and Tom Lungley
Southern Vipers won the toss and elected to bat.; Points: Southern Vipers 3, Loughborough Lightning 0				Rose Bowl, Southampton; Umpires: Ben Debenham and Tom Lungley

14 August	Yorkshire Diamonds; 118 (20 overs)	v	Western Storm; 119/4 (16.3 overs)	Western Storm won by 6 wickets
14:30; Scorecard	Yorkshire Diamonds; 118 (20 overs)	v	Western Storm; 119/4 (16.3 overs)	Headingley, Leeds; Umpires: Paul Pollard and Chris Watts
14:30; Scorecard	Beth Mooney 56 (44); Anya Shrubsole 5/23 (4 overs)		Rachel Priest 50 (35); Shabnim Ismail 2/16 (2 overs)	Headingley, Leeds; Umpires: Paul Pollard and Chris Watts
Western Storm won the toss and elected to field.; Points: Western Storm 2, Yorkshire Diamonds 0				Headingley, Leeds; Umpires: Paul Pollard and Chris Watts

=== Semi-final ===
21 August
11:00
Scorecard

Loughborough Lightning; 124/7 (20 overs)	v	Western Storm; 128/5 (19.3 overs)
Ellyse Perry 64* (48); Stafanie Taylor 3/31 (4 overs)		Heather Knight 52 (43); Dane van Niekerk 2/21 (4 overs)

Western Storm won by 5 wickets
County Cricket Ground, Chelmsford
Umpires: Ben Debenham and Tom Lungley

- Western Storm won the toss and elected to field.

=== Final ===
21 August
15:00
Scorecard

Western Storm; 140/5 (20 overs)	v	Southern Vipers; 143/3 (18.5 overs)
Rachel Priest 57 (55); Arran Brindle 2/15 (4 overs)		Suzie Bates 52 (46); Jodie Dibble 1/27 (4 overs)

Southern Vipers won by 7 wickets
County Cricket Ground, Chelmsford
Umpires: Russell Warren and Chris Watts

- Southern Vipers won the toss and elected to field.

== Statistics ==
- Highest score by a team: Loughborough Lightning – 168/6 (20 overs) v Surrey Stars (12 August).
- Lowest score by a team: Yorkshire Diamonds – 64 (16.3 overs) v Southern Vipers (8 August).
- Top score by an individual: Dane van Niekerk – 91 (64) v Surrey Stars (12 August).
- Best bowling figures by an individual: Anya Shrubsole – 5/23 (4 overs) v Yorkshire Diamonds (14 August).

=== Most runs ===
Player	Team	Matches	Innings	Runs	Average	HS	100s	50s
Stafanie Taylor	Western Storm	7	7	289	57.80	78*	0	2
Suzie Bates	Southern Vipers	6	6	232	46.40	57	0	2
Heather Knight	Western Storm	7	7	199	28.42	74	0	2
Ellyse Perry	Loughborough Lightning	6	6	190	47.50	64*	0	1
Nat Sciver	Surrey Stars	5	5	181	90.50	90*	0	1

Source: ESPNCricinfo

=== Most wickets ===
Player	Team	Overs	Wickets	Average	BBI	5w
Stafanie Taylor	Western Storm	26.0	11	16.09	4/14	0
Suzie Bates	Southern Vipers	20.2	9	13.77	2/8	0
Anya Shrubsole	Western Storm	26.0	9	16.22	5/23	1
Linsey Smith	Southern Vipers	18.0	8	11.50	4/10	0
Hayley Matthews	Lancashire Thunder	17.5	8	12.12	3/25	0

Source: ESPNCricinfo
