= List of Surrey Stars cricketers =

MD. Badrul Ahashan Konok

This is an alphabetical list of cricketers who played for Surrey Stars during their existence between 2016 and 2019. They competed in the Women's Cricket Super League, a Twenty20 competition, during these years before being replaced by South East Stars as part of a restructure of English women's domestic cricket.

Players' names are followed by the years in which they were active as a Surrey Stars player. Seasons given are first and last seasons; the player did not necessarily play in all the intervening seasons. This list only includes players who appeared in at least one match for Surrey Stars; players who were named in the team's squad for a season but did not play a match are not included.

== B ==
- Tammy Beaumont (2016–2017)

== C ==
- Aylish Cranstone (2018–2019)

== D ==
- Naomi Dattani (2016)
- Gwenan Davies (2019)
- Sophia Dunkley (2016–2018)

== F ==
- Rene Farrell (2016–2017)

== G ==
- Grace Gibbs (2017–2019)
- Amy Gordon (2019)
- Eva Gray (2018–2019)
- Cordelia Griffith (2016)

== H ==
- Alex Hartley (2016–2017)

== J ==
- Hannah Jones (2017–2019)

== K ==
- Marizanne Kapp (2016–2019)

== L ==
- Lizelle Lee (2017–2019)

== M ==
- Laura Marsh (2016–2019)
- Beth Morgan (2016)

== S ==
- Nat Sciver (2016–2019)
- Bryony Smith (2016–2019)
- Rhianna Southby (2018–2019)

== T ==
- Lea Tahuhu (2016)
- Sarah Taylor (2018–2019)

== V ==
- Dane van Niekerk (2018–2019)
- Mady Villiers (2018–2019)

== Captains ==
No.	Name	Nationality	Years	First	Last	Total Matches
1	Nat Sciver	England	2016–2019	31 July 2016	28 August 2019	31

== See also ==
- List of South East Stars cricketers
