= 2017 Women's Cricket Super League =

- Dates: 10 August 2017 – 1 September 2017
- Administrator(s): England and Wales Cricket Board
- Cricket format: Twenty20
- Tournament format(s): Round robin and knockout finals
- Champions: Western Storm (1st title)
- Participants: 6
- Matches: 17
- Most runs: Rachel Priest (261)
- Most wickets: Nat Sciver (12)

The 2017 Women's Cricket Super League, or 2017 Kia Super League for sponsorship reasons, was the second season of the Women's Cricket Super League (WCSL), a semi-professional women's cricket competition in England and Wales. The competition, run by the England and Wales Cricket Board (ECB), consisted of six franchise teams playing in a Twenty20 format. The Southern Vipers were the defending champions, but lost in the final to Western Storm.

== Competition format ==
Six teams competed for the T20 title which took place between 10 August and 1 September 2017. The six teams played each other once in a round-robin format; followed by a finals day at the County Cricket Ground, Hove.

== Teams ==
Location of WCSL teams

| Team | Home ground(s) | Coach | Captain |
|---|---|---|---|
| Lancashire Thunder | Old Trafford, Manchester; Stanley Park, Blackpool; Aigburth, Liverpool | Stephen Titchard | Danielle Hazell |
| Loughborough Lightning | Haslegrave Ground, Loughborough; County Ground, Derby | Salliann Briggs | Georgia Elwiss |
| Southern Vipers | Rose Bowl, Southampton; Arundel Castle Cricket Ground, Arundel | Nicholas Denning | Charlotte Edwards |
| Surrey Stars | The Oval, London | Richard Bedbrook | Nat Sciver |
| Western Storm | County Ground, Taunton; County Ground, Bristol | Trevor Griffin | Heather Knight |
| Yorkshire Diamonds | Headingley, Leeds; Clifton Park, York | Paul Grayson | Lauren Winfield |

== Points table ==
| Pos | Team | Pld | W | L | T | NR | BP | Pts | NRR |
|---|---|---|---|---|---|---|---|---|---|
| 1 | Southern Vipers | 5 | 4 | 1 | 0 | 0 | 4 | 20 | 2.001 |
| 2 | Surrey Stars | 5 | 4 | 1 | 0 | 0 | 2 | 18 | 0.291 |
| 3 | Western Storm | 5 | 3 | 2 | 0 | 0 | 0 | 12 | −0.887 |
| 4 | Loughborough Lightning | 5 | 2 | 3 | 0 | 0 | 2 | 10 | 0.664 |
| 5 | Yorkshire Diamonds | 5 | 2 | 3 | 0 | 0 | 0 | 8 | −0.318 |
| 6 | Lancashire Thunder | 5 | 0 | 5 | 0 | 0 | 0 | 0 | −1.692 |

Source: ESPN Cricinfo

== Fixtures ==
=== League stage ===
| 10 August 2017 | Western Storm; 70 (18.5 overs) | v | Southern Vipers; 73/1 (9 overs) | Southern Vipers won by 9 wickets |
| 14:30; Scorecard | Western Storm; 70 (18.5 overs) | v | Southern Vipers; 73/1 (9 overs) | Rose Bowl, Southampton; Umpires: David Millns and Steve O'Shaugnessy; Player of the match: Suzie Bates (Southern Vipers) |
| 14:30; Scorecard | Georgia Hennessy 22 (31); Tash Farrant 2/10 (4 overs) | | Suzie Bates 47* (31); Stafanie Taylor 1/3 (2 overs) | Rose Bowl, Southampton; Umpires: David Millns and Steve O'Shaugnessy; Player of the match: Suzie Bates (Southern Vipers) |
| Southern Vipers won the toss and elected to field.; Points: Southern Vipers 5, Western Storm 0 | | | | Rose Bowl, Southampton; Umpires: David Millns and Steve O'Shaugnessy; Player of the match: Suzie Bates (Southern Vipers) |

| 11 August 2017 | Yorkshire Diamonds; 162/4 (20 overs) | v | Lancashire Thunder; 134/7 (20 overs) | Yorkshire Diamonds won by 28 runs |
| 14:30; Scorecard | Yorkshire Diamonds; 162/4 (20 overs) | v | Lancashire Thunder; 134/7 (20 overs) | Headingley, Leeds; Umpires: Neil Bainton and Mike Burns; Player of the match: Alice Davidson-Richards (Yorkshire Diamonds) |
| 14:30; Scorecard | Lauren Winfield 44 (43); Danielle Hazell 2/34 (4 overs) | | Amy Satterthwaite 28 (26); Alice Davidson-Richards 3/20 (4 overs) | Headingley, Leeds; Umpires: Neil Bainton and Mike Burns; Player of the match: Alice Davidson-Richards (Yorkshire Diamonds) |
| Lancashire Thunder won the toss and elected to field.; Points: Yorkshire Diamonds 4, Lancashire Thunder 0 | | | | Headingley, Leeds; Umpires: Neil Bainton and Mike Burns; Player of the match: Alice Davidson-Richards (Yorkshire Diamonds) |

| 12 August 2017 | Loughborough Lightning; 108/9 (20 overs) | v | Western Storm; 109/5 (19.1 overs) | Western Storm won by 5 wickets |
| 12:00; Scorecard | Loughborough Lightning; 108/9 (20 overs) | v | Western Storm; 109/5 (19.1 overs) | County Ground, Taunton; Umpires: Ian Blackwell and Nick Cook; Player of the match: Stafanie Taylor (Western Storm) |
| 12:00; Scorecard | Ellyse Perry 25 (28); Stafanie Taylor 4/5 (4 overs) | | Stafanie Taylor 34 (32); Georgia Elwiss 2/24 (4 overs) | County Ground, Taunton; Umpires: Ian Blackwell and Nick Cook; Player of the match: Stafanie Taylor (Western Storm) |
| Western Storm won the toss and elected to field.; Points: Western Storm 4, Loughborough Lightning 0 | | | | County Ground, Taunton; Umpires: Ian Blackwell and Nick Cook; Player of the match: Stafanie Taylor (Western Storm) |

| 13 August 2017 | Yorkshire Diamonds; 100 (19.5 overs) | v | Surrey Stars; 104/2 (17.3 overs) | Surrey Stars won by 8 wickets |
| 18:45 (D/N); Scorecard | Yorkshire Diamonds; 100 (19.5 overs) | v | Surrey Stars; 104/2 (17.3 overs) | The Oval, London; Umpires: Neil Mallender and Tim Robinson; Player of the match: Marizanne Kapp (Surrey Stars) |
| 18:45 (D/N); Scorecard | Suné Luus 29 (32); Alex Hartley 3/15 (4 overs) | | Marizanne Kapp 48* (47); Katherine Brunt 1/12 (3.3 overs) | The Oval, London; Umpires: Neil Mallender and Tim Robinson; Player of the match: Marizanne Kapp (Surrey Stars) |
| Yorkshire Diamonds won the toss and elected to bat.; Points: Surrey Stars 4, Yorkshire Diamonds 0 | | | | The Oval, London; Umpires: Neil Mallender and Tim Robinson; Player of the match: Marizanne Kapp (Surrey Stars) |

| 15 August 2017 | Southern Vipers; 180/2 (20 overs) | v | Loughborough Lightning; 134 (20 overs) | Southern Vipers won by 46 runs |
| 14:30; Scorecard | Southern Vipers; 180/2 (20 overs) | v | Loughborough Lightning; 134 (20 overs) | County Ground, Derby; Umpires: Steve O'Shaugnessy and Martin Saggers; Player of the match: Suzie Bates (Southern Vipers) |
| 14:30; Scorecard | Suzie Bates 119* (72); Lucy Higham 1/29 (4 overs) | | Georgia Elwiss 32 (29); Suzie Bates 3/15 (3 overs) | County Ground, Derby; Umpires: Steve O'Shaugnessy and Martin Saggers; Player of the match: Suzie Bates (Southern Vipers) |
| Loughborough Lightning won the toss and elected to field.; Suzie Bates hit the first century in the Women's Cricket Super League.; Points: Southern Vipers 5, Loughborough Lightning 0 | | | | County Ground, Derby; Umpires: Steve O'Shaugnessy and Martin Saggers; Player of the match: Suzie Bates (Southern Vipers) |

| 16 August 2017 | Surrey Stars; 133/6 (20 overs) | v | Lancashire Thunder; 100 (18 overs) | Surrey Stars won by 33 runs |
| 14:30; Scorecard | Surrey Stars; 133/6 (20 overs) | v | Lancashire Thunder; 100 (18 overs) | Old Trafford, Manchester; Umpires: Neil Bainton and Graham Lloyd; Player of the match: Rene Farrell (Surrey Stars) |
| 14:30; Scorecard | Nat Sciver 40* (36); Danielle Hazell 2/16 (4 overs) | | Sarah Taylor 34 (30); Rene Farrell 5/26 (4 overs) | Old Trafford, Manchester; Umpires: Neil Bainton and Graham Lloyd; Player of the match: Rene Farrell (Surrey Stars) |
| Surrey Stars won the toss and elected to bat.; Points: Surrey Stars 5, Lancashire Thunder 0 | | | | Old Trafford, Manchester; Umpires: Neil Bainton and Graham Lloyd; Player of the match: Rene Farrell (Surrey Stars) |

| 18 August 2017 | Yorkshire Diamonds; 110/5 (13 overs) | v | Loughborough Lightning; 93/5 (13 overs) | Yorkshire Diamonds won by 17 runs |
| 16:00; Scorecard | Yorkshire Diamonds; 110/5 (13 overs) | v | Loughborough Lightning; 93/5 (13 overs) | Haslegrave Ground, Loughborough; Umpires: James Middlebrook and Mark Newell; Player of the match: Chamari Atapattu (Yorkshire Diamonds) |
| 16:00; Scorecard | Chamari Atapattu 66* (40); Kristen Beams 1/18 (3 overs) | | Georgia Elwiss 41 (28); Chamari Atapattu 2/11 (3 overs) | Haslegrave Ground, Loughborough; Umpires: James Middlebrook and Mark Newell; Player of the match: Chamari Atapattu (Yorkshire Diamonds) |
| Loughborough Lightning won the toss and elected to field.; Match reduced to 13 overs per side due to rain.; Points: Yorkshire Diamonds 4, Loughborough Lightning 0 | | | | Haslegrave Ground, Loughborough; Umpires: James Middlebrook and Mark Newell; Player of the match: Chamari Atapattu (Yorkshire Diamonds) |

| 20 August 2017 | Loughborough Lightning; 140/5 (20 overs) | v | Lancashire Thunder; 90 (17.2 overs) | Loughborough Lightning won by 50 runs |
| 14:30; Scorecard | Loughborough Lightning; 140/5 (20 overs) | v | Lancashire Thunder; 90 (17.2 overs) | Stanley Park, Blackpool; Umpires: Ian Blackwell and Chris Watts; Player of the match: Ellyse Perry (Loughborough Lightning) |
| 14:30; Scorecard | Ellyse Perry 78* (57); Danielle Hazell 2/16 (4 overs) | | Amy Satterthwaite 21 (23); Beth Langston 3/14 (2 overs) | Stanley Park, Blackpool; Umpires: Ian Blackwell and Chris Watts; Player of the match: Ellyse Perry (Loughborough Lightning) |
| Loughborough Lightning won the toss and elected to bat.; Points: Loughborough Lightning 5, Lancashire Thunder 0 | | | | Stanley Park, Blackpool; Umpires: Ian Blackwell and Chris Watts; Player of the match: Ellyse Perry (Loughborough Lightning) |

| 20 August 2017 | Surrey Stars; 127/8 (20 overs) | v | Southern Vipers; 100/7 (16.2 overs) | Surrey Stars won by 4 runs (DLS) |
| 14:30; Scorecard | Surrey Stars; 127/8 (20 overs) | v | Southern Vipers; 100/7 (16.2 overs) | Rose Bowl, Southampton; Umpires: Mark Newell and Russell Warren; Player of the match: Marizanne Kapp (Surrey Stars) |
| 14:30; Scorecard | Marizanne Kapp 42 (48); Hayley Matthews 2/23 (4 overs) | | Suzie Bates 50* (41); Nat Sciver 3/28 (3.2 overs) | Rose Bowl, Southampton; Umpires: Mark Newell and Russell Warren; Player of the match: Marizanne Kapp (Surrey Stars) |
| Surrey Stars won the toss and elected to bat.; Southern Vipers innings curtailed at 16.2 overs due to rain.; Southern Vipers' target at 16.2 overs was 105 runs to win.; Points: Surrey Stars 4, Southern Vipers 0 | | | | Rose Bowl, Southampton; Umpires: Mark Newell and Russell Warren; Player of the match: Marizanne Kapp (Surrey Stars) |

| 20 August 2017 | Yorkshire Diamonds; 160/7 (20 overs) | v | Western Storm; 161/0 (17 overs) | Western Storm won by 10 wickets |
| 14:30; Scorecard | Yorkshire Diamonds; 160/7 (20 overs) | v | Western Storm; 161/0 (17 overs) | Clifton Park Ground, York; Umpires: Ben Debenham and James Middlebrook; Player of the match: Rachel Priest (Western Storm) |
| 14:30; Scorecard | Lauren Winfield 58 (44); Holly Huddleston 1/19 (4 overs) | | Rachel Priest 106* (65) | Clifton Park Ground, York; Umpires: Ben Debenham and James Middlebrook; Player of the match: Rachel Priest (Western Storm) |
| Western Storm won the toss and elected to field.; Points: Western Storm 4, Yorkshire Diamonds 0 | | | | Clifton Park Ground, York; Umpires: Ben Debenham and James Middlebrook; Player of the match: Rachel Priest (Western Storm) |

| 23 August 2017 | Lancashire Thunder; 87 (20 overs) | v | Southern Vipers; 88/4 (14.5 overs) | Southern Vipers won by 6 wickets |
| 14:30; Scorecard | Lancashire Thunder; 87 (20 overs) | v | Southern Vipers; 88/4 (14.5 overs) | Aigburth Cricket Ground, Liverpool; Umpires: Ben Debenham and Paul Pollard; Player of the match: Danielle Wyatt (Southern Vipers) |
| 14:30; Scorecard | Danielle Hazell 37 (39); Linsey Smith 3/16 (4 overs) | | Danni Wyatt 46* (29); Sophie Ecclestone 2/19 (4 overs) | Aigburth Cricket Ground, Liverpool; Umpires: Ben Debenham and Paul Pollard; Player of the match: Danielle Wyatt (Southern Vipers) |
| Lancashire Thunder won the toss and elected to field.; Points: Southern Vipers 5, Lancashire Thunder 0 | | | | Aigburth Cricket Ground, Liverpool; Umpires: Ben Debenham and Paul Pollard; Player of the match: Danielle Wyatt (Southern Vipers) |

| 23 August 2017 | Surrey Stars; 169/6 (20 overs) | v | Western Storm; 117 (19.3 overs) | Surrey Stars won by 52 runs |
| 14:00; Scorecard | Surrey Stars; 169/6 (20 overs) | v | Western Storm; 117 (19.3 overs) | The Oval, London; Umpires: Ian Blackwell and Chris Watts; Player of the match: Lizelle Lee (Surrey Stars) |
| 14:00; Scorecard | Lizelle Lee 72 (44); Claire Nicholas 3/20 (4 overs) | | Alice Macleod 30 (29); Nat Sciver 3/11 (3.3 overs) | The Oval, London; Umpires: Ian Blackwell and Chris Watts; Player of the match: Lizelle Lee (Surrey Stars) |
| Western Storm won the toss and elected to field.; Points: Surrey Stars 5, Western Storm 0 | | | | The Oval, London; Umpires: Ian Blackwell and Chris Watts; Player of the match: Lizelle Lee (Surrey Stars) |

| 26 August 2017 | Southern Vipers; 138/6 (20 overs) | v | Yorkshire Diamonds; 108 (18.3 overs) | Southern Vipers won by 30 runs |
| 14:30; Scorecard | Southern Vipers; 138/6 (20 overs) | v | Yorkshire Diamonds; 108 (18.3 overs) | Arundel Castle Cricket Ground, Arundel; Umpires: Ian Blackwell and Chris Watts; Player of the match: Mignon du Preez (Southern Vipers) |
| 14:30; Scorecard | Mignon du Preez 50* (35); Katie Levick 3/21 (4 overs) | | Katherine Brunt 42 (30); Arran Brindle 2/13 (4 overs) | Arundel Castle Cricket Ground, Arundel; Umpires: Ian Blackwell and Chris Watts; Player of the match: Mignon du Preez (Southern Vipers) |
| Yorkshire Diamonds won the toss and elected to field.; Points: Southern Vipers 5, Yorkshire Diamonds 0 | | | | Arundel Castle Cricket Ground, Arundel; Umpires: Ian Blackwell and Chris Watts; Player of the match: Mignon du Preez (Southern Vipers) |

| 26 August 2017 | Loughborough Lightning; 171/3 (20 overs) | v | Surrey Stars; 90 (18 overs) | Loughborough Lightning won by 81 runs |
| 14:30; Scorecard | Loughborough Lightning; 171/3 (20 overs) | v | Surrey Stars; 90 (18 overs) | The Oval, London; Umpires: James Middlebrook and Paul Pollard; Player of the match: Ellyse Perry (Loughborough Lightning) |
| 14:30; Scorecard | Elyse Villani 71 (39); Laura Marsh 2/29 (4 overs) | | Nat Sciver 24 (18); Sarah Glenn 2/5 (3 overs) | The Oval, London; Umpires: James Middlebrook and Paul Pollard; Player of the match: Ellyse Perry (Loughborough Lightning) |
| Loughborough Lightning won the toss and elected to bat.; Points: Loughborough Lightning 5, Surrey Stars 0 | | | | The Oval, London; Umpires: James Middlebrook and Paul Pollard; Player of the match: Ellyse Perry (Loughborough Lightning) |

| 26 August 2017 | Lancashire Thunder; 122/5 (20 overs) | v | Western Storm; 123/5 (17.1 overs) | Western Storm won by 5 wickets |
| 14:30; Scorecard | Lancashire Thunder; 122/5 (20 overs) | v | Western Storm; 123/5 (17.1 overs) | County Ground, Bristol; Umpires: Tom Lungley and Russell Warren; Player of the match: Rachel Priest (Western Storm) |
| 14:30; Scorecard | Amy Satterthwaite 44 (41); Freya Davies 2/24 (4 overs) | | Rachel Priest 52 (26); Danielle Hazell 2/14 (4 overs) | County Ground, Bristol; Umpires: Tom Lungley and Russell Warren; Player of the match: Rachel Priest (Western Storm) |
| Western Storm won the toss and elected to bat.; Points: Western Storm 4, Lancashire Thunder 0 | | | | County Ground, Bristol; Umpires: Tom Lungley and Russell Warren; Player of the match: Rachel Priest (Western Storm) |

=== Semi-final ===
1 September
14:15
Scorecard

| Surrey Stars; 100/7 (20 overs) | v | Western Storm; 101/7 (18.5 overs) |
| Sophia Dunkley 30 (33); Anya Shrubsole 3/22 (4 overs) | | Stafanie Taylor 37* (45); Marizanne Kapp 3/11 (4 overs) |

Western Storm won by 3 wickets
County Ground, Hove
Umpires: David Millns and Martin Saggers
Player of the match: Stafanie Taylor (Western Storm)

- Surrey Stars won the toss and elected to bat.

=== Final ===
1 September
18:00 (D/N)
Scorecard

| Southern Vipers; 145/5 (20 overs) | v | Western Storm; 151/3 (18 overs) |
| Hayley Matthews 31 (28); Stafanie Taylor 3/28 (4 overs) | | Rachel Priest 72 (36); Arran Brindle 1/17 (4 overs) |

Western Storm won by 7 wickets
County Ground, Hove
Umpires: David Millns and Steve O'Shaughnessy
Player of the match: Rachel Priest (Western Storm)

- Western Storm won the toss and elected to field.

== Statistics ==
- Highest score by a team: Southern Vipers – 180/2 (20 overs) v Loughborough Lightning (15 August).
- Lowest score by a team: Western Storm – 70 (18.5 overs) v Southern Vipers (10 August).
- Top score by an individual: Suzie Bates – 119* (72) v Loughborough Lightning (15 August).
- Best bowling figures by an individual: Rene Farrell – 5/26 (4 overs) v Lancashire Thunder (16 August).

=== Most runs ===
| Player | Team | Matches | Innings | Runs | Average | HS | 100s | 50s |
|---|---|---|---|---|---|---|---|---|
| Rachel Priest | Western Storm | 7 | 7 | 261 | 43.50 | 106* | 1 | 2 |
| Suzie Bates | Southern Vipers | 6 | 6 | 260 | 86.66 | 119* | 1 | 1 |
| Ellyse Perry | Loughborough Lightning | 5 | 5 | 182 | 60.66 | 78* | 0 | 2 |
| Marizanne Kapp | Surrey Stars | 6 | 6 | 178 | 35.60 | 48* | 0 | 0 |
| Nat Sciver | Surrey Stars | 6 | 6 | 154 | 38.50 | 40* | 0 | 0 |

Source: ESPNCricinfo

=== Most wickets ===
| Player | Team | Overs | Wickets | Average | BBI | 5w |
|---|---|---|---|---|---|---|
| Nat Sciver | Surrey Stars | 21.5 | 12 | 11.75 | 3/11 | 0 |
| Danielle Hazell | Lancashire Thunder | 18.0 | 9 | 9.77 | 2/14 | 0 |
| Stafanie Taylor | Western Storm | 22.0 | 9 | 11.66 | 4/5 | 0 |
| Laura Marsh | Surrey Stars | 24.0 | 9 | 14.00 | 2/12 | 0 |
| Alex Hartley | Surrey Stars | 23.5 | 9 | 19.22 | 3/15 | 0 |

Source: ESPNCricinfo
