= List of South East Stars cricketers =

This is an alphabetical list of cricketers who played for South East Stars during their existence between 2020 and 2024. They first played in the Rachael Heyhoe Flint Trophy, a 50 over competition that began in 2020. In 2021, the Twenty20 Charlotte Edwards Cup was added to the women's domestic structure in England. At the end of the 2024 season, South East Stars were effectively replaced by a professionalised Surrey team.

Players' names are followed by the years in which they were active as a South East Stars player. Seasons given are first and last seasons; the player did not necessarily play in all the intervening seasons. This list only includes players who appeared in at least one match for South East Stars; players who were named in the team's squad for a season but did not play a match are not included.

== B ==
- Megan Belt (2020)
- Madeleine Blinkhorn-Jones (2022–2024)
- Maxine Blythin (2020)
- Chloe Brewer (2020–2022)
- Tazmin Brits (2023)

== C ==
- Alice Capsey (2020–2023)
- Darcey Carter (2023)
- Kira Chathli (2021–2024)
- Priyanaz Chatterji (2023–2024)
- Claudie Cooper (2023)
- Matilda Corteen-Coleman (2024)
- Aylish Cranstone (2020–2024)

== D ==
- Alice Davidson-Richards (2020–2024)
- Freya Davies (2020–2023)
- Sophia Dunkley (2020–2024)

== F ==
- Tash Farrant (2020–2024)
- Phoebe Franklin (2020–2024)

== G ==
- Grace Gibbs (2020–2022)
- Amy Gordon (2020)
- Eva Gray (2020–2022)
- Danielle Gregory (2020–2024)

== H ==
- Chloe Hill (2023–2024)

== J ==
- Emma Jones (2021–2024)
- Hannah Jones (2020)

== M ==
- Ryana MacDonald-Gay (2021–2024)
- Bethan Miles (2022–2024)
- Kalea Moore (2021–2024)

== R ==
- Georgia Redmayne (2024)
- Suzie Rowe (2020–2021)

== S ==
- Paige Scholfield (2023–2024)
- Bryony Smith (2020–2024)
- Lauren Smith (2022)
- Rhianna Southby (2020–2022)
- Jemima Spence (2022–2023)
- Alexa Stonehouse (2021–2024)

== W ==
- Kirstie White (2020–2022)

== Captains ==
No.	Name	Nationality	Years	First	Last	LA	T20	Total
1	Tash Farrant	England	2020–2024	29 August 2020	27 April 2024	10	1	11
2	Bryony Smith	England	2021–2024	12 June 2021	21 September 2024	33	32	65
3	Alice Davidson-Richards	England	2021–2022	18 September 2021	11 September 2022	3	0	3
4	Aylish Cranstone	England	2022	16 July 2022	16 July 2022	1	0	1
5	Danielle Gregory	England	2023	2 July 2023	2 July 2023	1	0	1
6	Kira Chathli	England	2024	4 September 2024	14 September 2024	3	0	3

== See also ==
- List of Surrey Stars cricketers
