= Stephen Titchard =

English cricketer (born 1967)

Stephen Paul Titchard (born 17 December 1967 in Warrington, Lancashire) is a cricket coach and a former professional cricketer. He batted right-handed and bowled right-arm medium pace for Lancashire and Derbyshire, from 1989 to 2001. He came through into the Lancashire first team at roughly the same time as contemporaries such as Mike Atherton and Graham Lloyd. He played his junior cricket at Grapenhall Cricket Club near Warrington. His junior successes were shared with Stephen Bramhall and Rob Cook who both went on to play professional cricket.

Titchard was head coach of Lancashire Thunder in 2017.

He was also a capable fielder, at short leg or slip.
