= Lancashire Thunder =

Personnel
- Captain: Kate Cross
- Coach: Mark McInnes (2019); Alex Blackwell (2018); Stephen Titchard (2016–2017)

Team information
- Colours: Red
- Founded: 2016
- Home ground: Old Trafford, Manchester
- Secondary home ground(s): Aigburth, Liverpool; Stanley Park, Blackpool; Chester Boughton Hall CC, Chester

History
- WCSL wins: 0
- Official website: Lancashire Cricket
T20 kit

Lancashire Thunder is an English women's Twenty20 cricket team based in Manchester, Lancashire that competed in England's women's Twenty20 competition, the Women's Cricket Super League. Thunder played their home matches at Old Trafford and various grounds across the North West. They were captained by Kate Cross and coached by Mark McInnes, working with General Manager Bobby Cross. In 2020, following reforms to the structure of women's domestic cricket, some elements of Lancashire Thunder were retained for a new team, North West Thunder.

== History ==
=== 2016-2019: Women's Cricket Super League ===
Lancashire Thunder were formed in 2016 to compete in the new Women's Cricket Super League, partnering with Lancashire CCC. In their inaugural season, they finished bottom of the group stage, winning just one game. In 2017, they fared even worse, failing to win a game as they finished bottom of the group once again.

2018 brought an expansion to the WCSL, with each side now playing 10 games, and Lancashire Thunder improved under the new format, winning 5 out of their 10 games. However, this still meant they just missed out on progressing to Finals Day, finishing 4th. Thunder bowler Sophie Ecclestone was the third highest wicket-taker in the tournament, with 15. In 2019, Lancashire Thunder once again finished bottom of the group, with no wins and one tie. Following this season, women's cricket in England was restructured and Lancashire Thunder were disbanded as part of the reforms; however they survived in spirit for a new team, North West Thunder, who represented a larger area, but retained some of their players.

== Home grounds ==
Venue	Games hosted by season				
Venue	16	17	18	19	Total
Old Trafford Cricket Ground	1	1	2	1	5
Stanley Park, Blackpool	1	1	1	1	4
Aigburth Cricket Ground, Liverpool	–	1	1	2	4
Trafalgar Road Ground	–	–	1	–	1
Chester Boughton Hall	–	–	–	1	1

== Players ==
Final squad, 2019 season

- No. denotes the player's squad number, as worn on the back of their shirt.
- ‡ denotes players with international caps.

No.	Name	Nationality	Birth date	Batting style	Bowling style	Notes
Batters
8	Georgie Boyce	England	4 October 1998 (age 27)	Right-handed	Right-arm medium	
11	Evelyn Jones	England	8 August 1992 (age 33)	Left-handed	Left-arm medium	England Academy player
30	Danielle Collins	England	7 June 2000 (age 25)	Left-handed	Right-arm medium	
77	Ria Fackrell	England	16 September 1999 (age 26)	Right-handed	Right-arm off break	
All-rounders
6	Emma Lamb	England	16 December 1997 (age 28)	Right-handed	Right-arm off break	England Academy player
7	Harmanpreet Kaur ‡	India	8 March 1989 (age 37)	Right-handed	Right-arm off break	Overseas player
10	Natalie Brown	England	16 October 1990 (age 35)	Right-handed	Right-arm medium	
14	Tahlia McGrath ‡	Australia	10 November 1995 (age 30)	Right-handed	Right-arm medium	Overseas player
47	Sophia Dunkley ‡	England	16 July 1998 (age 27)	Right-handed	Right-arm leg break	
96	Sune Luus ‡	South Africa	5 January 1996 (age 30)	Right-handed	Right-arm leg break	Overseas player
Wicket-keepers
21	Eleanor Threlkeld	England	16 November 1998 (age 27)	Right-handed	—	England Academy player
Bowlers
16	Kate Cross ‡	England	3 October 1991 (age 34)	Right-handed	Right-arm medium-fast	Club captain; England Performance squad
19	Sophie Ecclestone ‡	England	6 May 1999 (age 26)	Right-handed	Slow left-arm orthodox	England Academy player
63	Alice Dyson	England	28 January 1999 (age 27)	Right-handed	Right-arm medium	
65	Alex Hartley ‡	England	6 September 1993 (age 32)	Right-handed	Slow left-arm orthodox	

=== Overseas players ===
- (Cricket West Indies) Deandra Dottin – West Indies (2016)
- (Cricket West Indies) Hayley Matthews – West Indies (2016)
- Amy Satterthwaite – New Zealand (2016–2018)
- Jess Jonassen – Australia (2017)
- Lea Tahuhu – New Zealand (2017)
- Harmanpreet Kaur – India (2018–2019)
- Nicole Bolton – Australia (2018)
- Tahlia McGrath – Australia (2019)
- Suné Luus – South Africa (2019)

== Seasons ==
Season	Final standing	League standings									Notes
Season	Final standing	P	W	L	T	NR	BP	Pts	NRR	Pos	Notes
2016	Group stage	5	1	4	0	0	0	2	–1.724	6th	DNQ
2017	Group stage	5	0	5	0	0	0	0	–1.692	6th	DNQ
2018	Group stage	10	5	5	0	0	1	21	–0.825	4th	DNQ
2019	Group stage	10	0	9	1	0	0	2	–1.194	6th	DNQ

== Statistics ==
=== Overall Results ===
Summary of Results
Year	Played	Wins	Losses	Tied	NR	Win %
2016	5	1	4	0	0	20.00
2017	5	0	5	0	0	0.00
2018	10	5	5	0	0	50.00
2019	10	0	9	1	0	0.00
Total	30	6	23	1	0	21.66

- Abandoned matches are counted as NR (no result)
- Win or loss by super over or boundary count are counted as tied.

=== Teamwise Result summary ===
Opposition	Mat	Won	Lost	Tied	NR	Win %
Southern Vipers	6	2	3	1	0	41.66
Yorkshire Diamonds	6	2	4	0	0	33.33
Western Storm	6	0	6	0	0	0.00
Surrey Stars	6	1	5	0	0	16.66
Loughborough Lightning	6	1	5	0	0	16.66

== Records ==
- Highest team total: 164/8, v Loughborough Lightning on 3 August 2016.
- Lowest team total: 71, v Yorkshire Diamonds on 12 August 2016.
- Highest individual score: 87, Nicole Bolton v Surrey Stars on 31 July 2018.
- Best individual bowling analysis: 4/17, Emma Lamb v Southern Vipers on 29 July 2018.
- Most Runs: 533 in 20 matches, Amy Satterthwaite.
- Most wickets: 39 wickets in 30 matches, Sophie Ecclestone.

== See also ==
- Lancashire Cricket Board
- Lancashire Women cricket team
- Lancashire County Cricket Club
