= Russell Warren (cricketer) =

English cricketer and umpire

Personal information
- Full name: Russell John Warren
- Born: 10 September 1971 (age 55); Northampton, England
- Batting: Right-handed
- Role: Wicket-keeper

Domestic team information
- Years: Team
- 1992–2002: Northamptonshire
- 2003–2006: Nottinghamshire

Umpiring information
- ODIs umpired: 7 (2024–2025)
- T20Is umpired: 17 (2024–2025)
- WODIs umpired: 4 (2013–2024)
- WT20Is umpired: 5 (2013–2023)

Career statistics
Competition	FC	LA	T20
Matches	146	177	2
Runs scored	7,776	3,363	26
Batting average	36.67	24.54	26.00
100s/50s	15/41	1/15	0/0
Top score	201*	100*	26
Balls bowled	6	–	–
Wickets	0	–	–
Bowling average	–	–	–
5 wickets in innings	0	–	–
10 wickets in match	0	–	–
Best bowling	0/0	–	–
Catches/stumpings	128/5	135/11	–/–
- Source: Cricinfo, 10 April 2022

Russell Warren (born 10 September 1971) is an English cricket umpire and former first-class cricketer. He was a right-handed batsman and wicket-keeper.

As a youth he toured New Zealand with England Young Cricketers in the 1990–91 season, playing two test matches and two one day internationals. He also played two youth ODIs against Australia the following summer, opening the batting with future county colleague Mal Loye.

He made his first team debut for his home-county Northamptonshire in 1992, and played for the county in 109 first-class matches over ten seasons. During this time he made ten centuries, with a highest score of 201 not out, but only reached the landmark of 1000 runs in a season once; in 2001.

Russell left Northamptonshire at the end of the 2002 season to join Nottinghamshire whom he represented from 2003 to 2006. Despite scoring five first-class centuries in this period, he was released at the end of the 2006 season.

Russell took up umpiring and was added to the ECB First-Class Panel in 2018. He has since been promoted to the International Panel in 2024.

== See also ==
- List of One Day International cricket umpires
- List of Twenty20 International cricket umpires
