= Sports Ground, Woodbridge Road, Guildford =

Cricket ground in Guildford, England

Coordinates: 51°14′34″N 0°34′38″W

Woodbridge Road
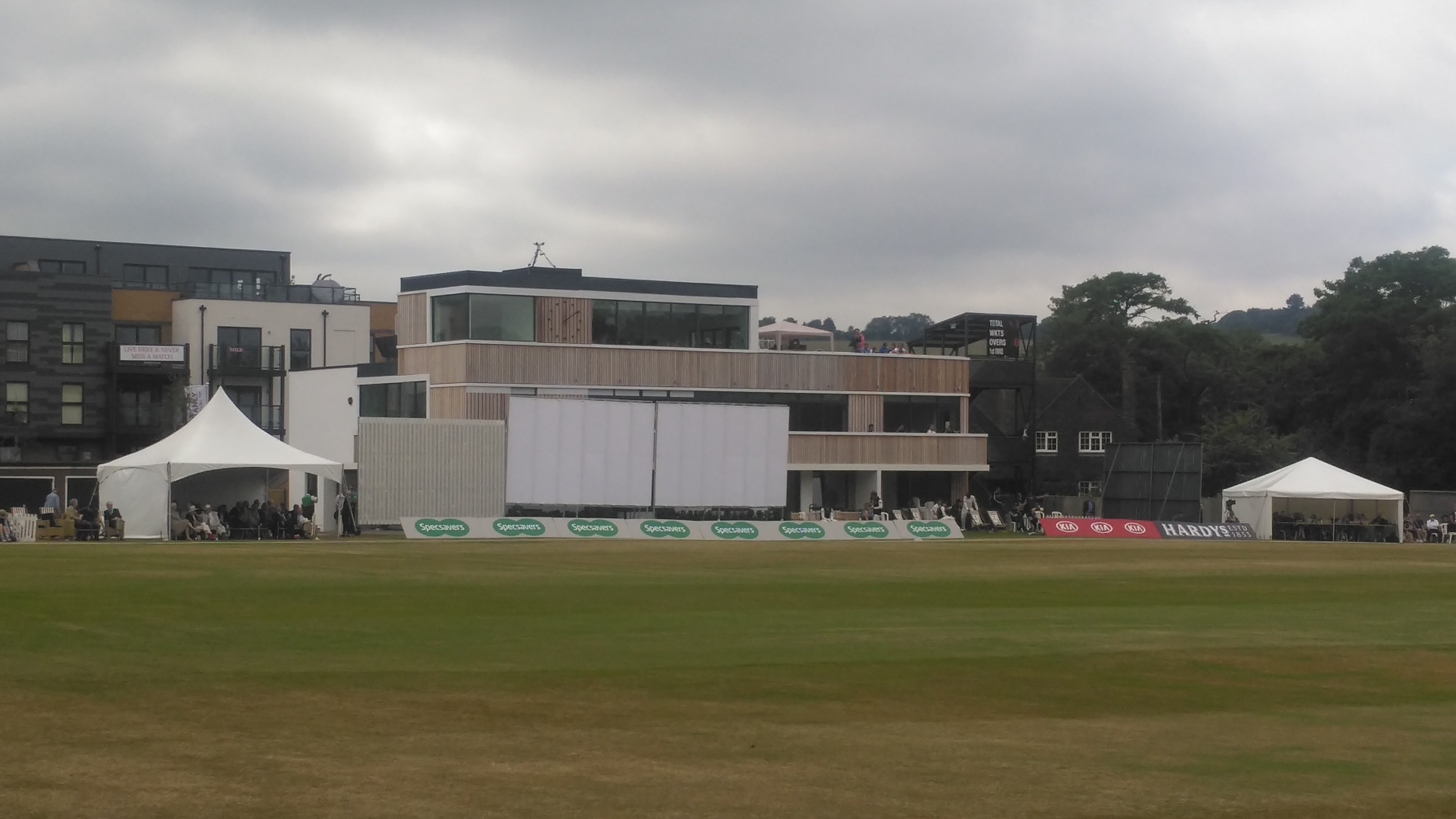

Ground information
- Location: Guildford, Surrey, England
- Establishment: 1911
- Capacity: 4,500
- Owner: Guildford
- Tenants: Guildford Cricket Club
- End names
- Pavilion End; Railway End

International information
- First women's Test: 12–16 July 1996: England v New Zealand
- Last women's Test: 6–10 August 1998: England v Australia
- First WODI: 22 July 1987: England v Australia
- Last WODI: 26 July 1993: England v Australia
- As of 5 September 2020; Source: CricketArchive

The Sports Ground, Woodbridge Road is a cricket ground in Guildford, Surrey. The ground was given to the town in trust in 1911 by Sir Harry Waechter, Bart. Guildford Cricket Club play their home matches on the ground. Surrey County Cricket Club usually play at least one first team match there each season, as well as some second XI and Surrey Stars fixtures. Until comparatively recently, hockey was played on the ground in winter. The ground was also used for football until at least 1921. It was the home ground of the amateur team Guildford F.C. who existed until 1953 (not to be confused with the professional Guildford City team who played at Josephs Road) and was also used as the venue for some Surrey Senior Cup finals.

The ground capacity is 4,500. The two ends of the ground are known as the Pavilion End and the Railway End.

== History ==
The 2nd Royal Surrey Militia used the 'Woodbridge Road cricket ground' for its annual drill from 1853 until the 1860s, and particularly during the Crimean War when the regiment was embodied for full time service but was quarantined at Guildford due to an outbreak of smallpox.

Surrey first used the ground in 1938, against Hampshire from 13 to 15 July, winning by an innings. They have played there in most seasons since.

In 1957, as part of a visit to Guildford to mark the 700th anniversary of the granting of a royal charter to the town by Henry III, the Queen and the Duke of Edinburgh visited the ground during a county fixture, and the two teams (Surrey and Hampshire) were presented to them.

The ground is on the small side, so that some high scores have been made there. The highest individual innings played on the ground in first-class matches is Justin Langer's 342 for Somerset in 2006. Somerset made 688-8 declared in their first innings in this match, but Surrey responded with 717 - the highest total made on the ground - and the match was drawn.

The most notable bowling feat is Martin Bicknell's against Leicestershire in 2000. He had match figures of 16-119, the second best match figures ever returned for Surrey. His figures in the second innings were 9-47.

The highest individual innings in a List A one-day match on the ground is 203 by Alastair Brown in a 40 overs a side AXA Life League match against Hampshire in 1997. This remains the highest score in any 40 overs List A match played in England.

The English women's cricket team have played two Test Matches on the ground, against New Zealand in 1996 and against Australia in 1998.

The former Woodbridge Road groundsman, Bill Clutterbuck, won the Ransomes Jacobsen Trophy for Achievements in Cricket Groundsmanship at the ECB's annual pre-season dinner for First Class Groundsmen for 2006.

Surrey currently play at least one match at Woodbridge Road each season as part of a festival.

In 2018 a new pavilion was opened offering much improved facilities, as well as being an events and private hire venue. In 2019, Surrey CCC took over ground maintenance. In 2019, the ground hosted two championship games versus Somerset and Yorkshire and four Surrey Stars matches in the Women's Cricket Super League season.

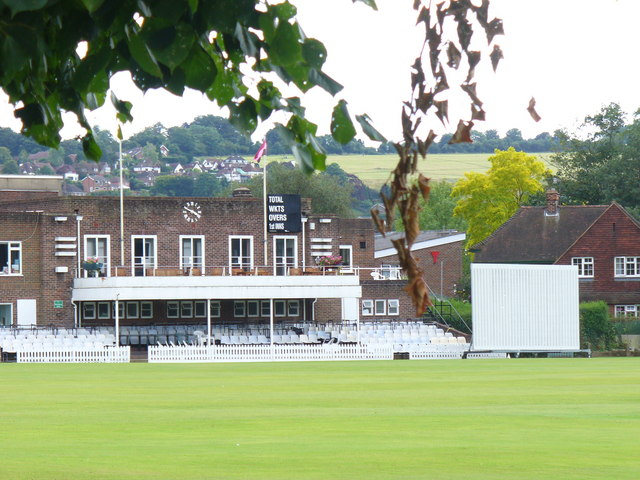
The former pavilion, since demolished

== See also ==
- List of cricket grounds in England and Wales
