= Eva Gray (cricketer) =

English cricketer

Personal information
- Full name: Eva Gray
- Born: 24 May 2000 (age 26); Kingston upon Thames, Surrey, England
- Batting: Right-handed
- Bowling: Right-arm medium
- Role: Bowler

Domestic team information
- Years: Team
- 2014–present: Surrey
- 2018–2019: Surrey Stars
- 2020–2022: South East Stars
- 2021–2023: Oval Invincibles
- 2023–2024: Sunrisers
- 2024–present: London Spirit

Career statistics
Competition	WLA	WT20
Matches	50	92
Runs scored	367	358
Batting average	10.48	10.84
100s/50s	0/1	0/0
Top score	52*	34*
Balls bowled	1,722	1,154
Wickets	53	51
Bowling average	22.60	27.31
5 wickets in innings	0	0
10 wickets in match	0	0
Best bowling	4/31	4/16
Catches/stumpings	15/–	16/–
- Source: CricketArchive, 19 October 2024

Eva Gray (born 24 May 2000) is an English cricketer who currently plays for Surrey and London Spirit. She plays as a right-arm medium bowler. She previously played for Surrey Stars, South East Stars, Sunrisers and Oval Invincibles.

== Domestic career ==
Gray made her county debut in 2014, for Surrey against Essex. Gray was part of the Surrey team that won promotion from Division 2 of the County Championship in 2018, and she took 11 wickets at an average of 13.00 in the tournament, as well as hitting her maiden county half-century, scoring 52* against Essex. In 2019, Gray achieved her best Twenty20 bowling figures, taking 4/16 against Middlesex. She took two wickets for the side in the 2021 Women's Twenty20 Cup. She took four wickets for Surrey in the 2022 Women's Twenty20 Cup, including best bowling figures of 3/17.

Gray also played for Surrey Stars in the Women's Cricket Super League in 2018 and 2019. In 2018, she played nine games in the Stars' successful campaign, including their victory in the final over Loughborough Lightning. She also appeared in 5 games in 2019.

In 2020, Gray played for South East Stars in the Rachael Heyhoe Flint Trophy. She appeared in two matches, and took 2 wickets, both in a match against Southern Vipers. Gray was in the South East Stars squad for 2021, but did not play a match. She was also in the Oval Invincibles squad for The Hundred, playing three matches and taking one wicket. She played seven matches for South East Stars in 2022, all in the Rachael Heyhoe Flint Trophy, and was the side's leading wicket-taker, with 9 wickets at an average of 21.55. She was also ever-present in the victorious The Hundred campaign of Oval Invincibles, and was the side's joint-leading wicket-taker, with 8 wickets at an average of 12.62.

At the end of the 2022 season, it was announced that Gray had moved to Sunrisers, and had signed a professional contract with her new side. That season, she was the side's joint-leading wicket-taker in the Rachael Heyhoe Flint Trophy, with 14 wickets at an average of 19.07, as well as taking four wickets in the Charlotte Edwards Cup. She also took four wickets in seven matches for Oval Invincibles in The Hundred. In 2024, she played 20 matches for Sunrisers, across the Rachael Heyhoe Flint Trophy and the Charlotte Edwards Cup, taking 21 wickets.

In October 2024, she signed for Essex Women ahead of the 2025 women's domestic cricket restructure.
