= Tom Lungley =

English cricketer and umpire

Personal information
- Full name: Tom Lungley
- Born: 25 July 1979 (age 47); Derby, Derbyshire, England
- Height: 6 ft 2 in (1.88 m)
- Batting: Left-handed
- Bowling: Right-arm medium
- Role: Bowler

Domestic team information
- Years: Team
- 2000–2010: Derbyshire
- 2009: Lancashire (on loan)

Umpiring information
- WODIs umpired: 1 (2013)
- WT20Is umpired: 2 (2013)

Career statistics
Competition	FC	LA	T20
Matches	55	81	30
Runs scored	885	396	107
Batting average	14.50	11.31	13.37
100s/50s	0/1	0/0	0/0
Top score	50	45	25
Balls bowled	7,421	3,124	475
Wickets	149	89	30
Bowling average	32.10	30.74	21.46
5 wickets in innings	3	0	1
10 wickets in match	0	0	0
Best bowling	5/20	4/28	5/27
Catches/stumpings	25/–	21/–	8/–
- Source: Cricinfo, 25 August 2015

Tom Lungley (born 25 July 1979) is an English first-class cricketer and umpire. He is a left-handed batsman and a right-arm medium-pace bowler.

During his five seasons at the top of the English game, he played for Derbyshire in List A and Twenty20 cricket. He, however, missed the entire 2004 season after suffering from tendinitis but following their disastrous 2005 season, he turned to the national league, where he played the vast majority of The Phantoms' games.

Lungley was awarded a new contract at Derbyshire for 2006, securing his future for the time being. In a 2007 game against Leicestershire, Lungley bowled career-best figures of 5-20.

In August 2009, Lungley was given a taste of cricket in the first division of the County Championship when he played for Lancashire on loan. At the time, the club's bowling attack had been severely depleted by injuries to Glen Chapple, Steven Cheetham, and Sajid Mahmood and Andrew Flintoff and James Anderson were on England duty.

He stood as an umpire in the first-class match between the Australians and Derbyshire on 23 July 2015.
