= Grace Gibbs =

English cricketer

Personal information
- Full name: Grace Julia Gibbs
- Born: 1 May 1995 (age 31); Lewisham, Greater London, England
- Height: 5 ft 8 in (1.73 m)
- Batting: Right-handed
- Bowling: Right-arm medium
- Role: All-rounder

Domestic team information
- Years: Team
- 2012–present: Kent
- 2016–2019: Surrey Stars
- 2020–2022: South East Stars
- 2021–2022: Oval Invincibles

Career statistics
Competition	WLA	WT20
Matches	42	68
Runs scored	308	390
Batting average	12.32	15.00
100s/50s	0/0	0/0
Top score	33	60
Balls bowled	1,177	533
Wickets	31	30
Bowling average	27.06	18.03
5 wickets in innings	0	1
10 wickets in match	0	0
Best bowling	4/39	5/11
Catches/stumpings	12/–	15/–
- Source: CricketArchive, 5 October 2022

Grace Julia Gibbs (born 1 May 1995) is an English cricketer who currently plays for Kent. An all-rounder, she plays as a right-handed batter and right-arm medium bowler. She previously played for Surrey Stars in the Women's Cricket Super League, South East Stars in regional cricket and Oval Invincibles in The Hundred.

== Early life ==
Gibbs was born on 1 May 1995 in Lewisham, Greater London.

== Domestic career ==
Gibbs made her county debut in 2012, for Kent against Middlesex. In 2014, Gibbs won the County Championship with Kent, a season in which she also achieved her List A best bowling figures, taking 4/39 against Warwickshire. Gibbs also appeared for Kent in their successful 2016 season, in which they won the double of the County Championship and Twenty20 Cup. She missed much of the 2019 season with a knee injury. In 2021, she scored her Twenty20 high score and took her Twenty20 best bowling figures in the Twenty20 Cup, scoring 60 from 49 balls against Middlesex and taking 5/11 against Essex.

Gibbs also played for Surrey Stars in the Women's Cricket Super League between 2016 and 2019. After not appearing for the side in 2016, she played six matches in 2017, scoring 10 runs in 2 innings. She again played six matches in the Stars' victorious 2018 campaign, taking 3 wickets at an average of 12.66 before being ruled out with injury. In 2019, Gibbs played three matches, taking 1/6 the only time she bowled.

In 2020, Gibbs played for South East Stars in the Rachael Heyhoe Flint Trophy. She appeared in four matches, scoring 36 runs but failing to take a wicket. Against Southern Vipers, she hit a "rapid" 30 off 19 balls to help her side to a competitive total. In 2021, she played eleven matches for the side across the Rachael Heyhoe Flint Trophy and the Charlotte Edwards Cup, which her side won. She was also ever-present throughout the Oval Invincibles' victorious The Hundred campaign. She played two matches for South East Stars in 2022, both in the Rachael Heyhoe Flint Trophy, scoring 15 runs and taking one wicket. She was also again part of the Oval Invincibles squad in The Hundred, but did not play a match.

Gibbs also played for Rubies in the 2013 Super Fours.
