= Surrey Stars =

Personnel
- Captain: Natalie Sciver
- Coach: Richard Bedbrook (2016–2019)

Team information
- Colours: Light blue
- Founded: 2016
- Home ground: The Oval, London; Woodbridge Road, Guildford

History
- WCSL wins: 1
- Official website: Surrey Stars
T20 kit

The Surrey Stars were an English women's Twenty20 cricket team based in South London that competed in the English women's Twenty20 competition, the Women's Cricket Super League. The Stars played their home matches at The Oval and Woodbridge Road, Guildford. They were captained by Nat Sciver and coached by Richard Bedbrook, working with Surrey's Director of Women's Cricket Ebony Rainford-Brent. The Stars won the 2018 Women's Cricket Super League, beating Loughborough Lightning in the final at the County Cricket Ground, Hove. In 2020, following reforms to the structure of women's domestic cricket, some elements of the Surrey Stars were retained for a new team, the South East Stars.

== History ==
=== 2016–2019: Women's Cricket Super League ===
Surrey Stars were formed in 2016 to compete in the new Women's Cricket Super League, partnering with Surrey CCC. In their inaugural season, they finished 4th in the group stage, just missing out on Finals Day, winning two matches. In 2017, the Stars improved, winning four of their five games to finish second in the group and progress to the semi-final. However, here they were beaten by eventual tournament winners Western Storm, by 3 wickets. Stars all-rounder Nat Sciver was the leading wicket-taker in the tournament, with 12 wickets.

In 2018, Surrey Stars finished 3rd in the group stage, with 5 wins, qualifying for the semi-final where they again faced Western Storm. This time, the Stars were victorious, winning by 9 runs thanks to a Player of the Match performance from Nat Sciver, who scored 72* and took two wickets. In the final, the Stars faced Loughborough Lightning. Batting first, the Stars posted 183, with overseas player Lizelle Lee hitting 104. Loughborough then collapsed to 117 all out, giving Surrey Stars their first WCSL title.

2019 saw a reversal in Surrey's fortunes, as they finished 5th out of 6 in the group stage, with 3 wins. This was the final season of Surrey Stars' existence, as women's cricket in England was reformed in 2020; the South East Stars retained some elements of Surrey Stars, but represent a larger region under the new structure.

== Home grounds ==
Venue	Games hosted by season				
Venue	16	17	18	19	Total
The Oval	1	3	2	1	7
Woodbridge Road, Guildford	1	–	3	4	8

== Players ==
Final squad, 2019 season

- No. denotes the player's squad number, as worn on the back of their shirt.
- ‡ denotes players with international caps.

No.	Name	Nationality	Birth date	Batting style	Bowling style	Notes
Batters
28	Aylish Cranstone	England	28 August 1994 (age 31)	Left-handed	Left-arm medium	
67	Lizelle Lee ‡	South Africa	2 April 1992 (age 33)	Right-handed	Right-arm medium	Overseas player
All-rounders
4	Bryony Smith	England	11 December 1997 (age 27)	Right-handed	Right-arm off break	England Academy player
8	Hannah Jones	England	21 July 1999 (age 26)	Right-handed	Right-arm off break	England Academy player
10	Nat Sciver ‡	England	20 August 1992 (age 33)	Right-handed	Right-arm medium	Club captain; England Performance squad
23	Marizanne Kapp ‡	South Africa	4 January 1990 (age 35)	Right-handed	Right-arm medium	Overseas player
81	Dane van Niekerk ‡	South Africa	14 May 1993 (age 32)	Right-handed	Right-arm leg break	Overseas player
Wicket-keepers
17	Rhianna Southby	England	16 October 2000 (age 24)	Right-handed	—	
30	Sarah Taylor ‡	England	20 May 1989 (age 36)	Right-handed	—	England Performance squad
79	Gwenan Davies	Wales	12 May 1994 (age 31)	Left-handed	Right-arm medium	
Bowlers
7	Laura Marsh ‡	England	5 December 1986 (age 38)	Right-handed	Right-arm off break	England Performance squad
18	Eva Gray	England	24 May 2000 (age 25)	Right-handed	Right-arm medium	
21	Amy Gordon	England	3 October 2001 (age 23)	Right-handed	Right-arm medium	England Academy player
26	Mady Villiers ‡	England	26 August 1998 (age 27)	Right-handed	Right-arm off break	England Performance squad
61	Grace Gibbs	England	1 May 1995 (age 30)	Right-handed	Right-arm medium	

=== Overseas players ===
- Rene Farrell – Australia (2016–2017)
- Marizanne Kapp – South Africa (2016–2019)
- Lea Tahuhu – New Zealand (2016)
- Lizelle Lee – South Africa (2017–2019)
- Dane van Niekerk – South Africa (2018–2019)

== Seasons ==
=== Women's Cricket Super League ===
Season	Final standing	League standings									Notes
Season	Final standing	P	W	L	T	NR	BP	Pts	NRR	Pos	Notes
2016	Group stage	5	2	3	0	0	1	5	–0.274	4th	DNQ
2017	Losing semi-finalists: 3rd	5	4	1	0	0	2	18	+0.291	2nd	Lost to Western Storm in the semi-final
2018	Champions	10	5	4	0	1	2	24	–0.404	3rd	Won against Loughborough Lightning in the final
2019	Group stage	10	3	6	0	1	2	16	–0.857	5th	DNQ

== Statistics ==
=== Overall Results ===
Women's Cricket Super League - summary of results
Year	Played	Wins	Losses	Tied	NR	Win %
2016	5	2	3	0	0	40.00
2017	6	4	2	0	0	66.66
2018	12	7	4	0	1	58.33
2019	10	3	6	0	1	30.00
Total	33	16	15	0	2	48.48

- Abandoned matches are counted as NR (no result)
- Win or loss by super over or boundary count are counted as tied.

=== Teamwise Result summary ===
Opposition	Mat	Won	Lost	Tied	NR	Win %
Lancashire Thunder	6	5	1	0	0	83.33
Loughborough Lightning	7	2	5	0	0	28.57
Southern Vipers	6	2	3	0	1	33.33
Western Storm	8	4	4	0	0	50.00
Yorkshire Diamonds	6	3	2	0	1	50.00

== Records ==
- Highest team total: 183/6, v Loughborough Lightning on 27 August 2018.
- Lowest team total: 66, v Yorkshire Diamonds on 12 August 2018.
- Highest individual score: 104, Lizelle Lee v Loughborough Lightning on 27 August 2018.
- Best individual bowling analysis: 5/26, Rene Farrell v Lancashire Thunder on 16 August 2017.
- Most runs: 930 in 31 matches, Nat Sciver.
- Most wickets: 32 wickets in 31 matches, Nat Sciver.

== Honours ==
- Women's Cricket Super League:
  - Champions (1) – 2018

== See also ==
- Surrey County Cricket Club
- Surrey Women cricket team
