= Richard Bedbrook =

English cricketer

Personal information
- Full name: Richard Denison Bedbrook
- Born: 29 July 1978 (age 48); Bury, Greater Manchester, England
- Nickname: Bedders
- Batting: Right-handed
- Bowling: Right-arm medium-fast
- Role: Bowler

Domestic team information
- Years: Team
- 2000–2010: Wiltshire

Career statistics
Competition	LA
Matches	4
Runs scored	53
Batting average	53.00
100s/50s	0/0
Top score	24*
Balls bowled	216
Wickets	5
Bowling average	32.80
5 wickets in innings	0
10 wickets in match	–
Best bowling	2/49
Catches/stumpings	3/–
- Source: Cricinfo, 12 October 2010

Richard Denison Bedbrook (born 29 July 1978) is an English professional cricket coach and former player. Bedbrook was a right-handed batsman who bowled right-arm medium-fast.

Bedbrook made his Minor Counties Championship debut for Wiltshire in 2000 against Devon. From 2000 to 2008, he represented the county in 38 Minor Counties Championship matches, the last of which came against Berkshire. Bedbrook has also represented Wiltshire in the MCCA Knockout Trophy. His debut in that competition came against Cornwall in 2001. He has represented the county in 26 Trophy matches.

Bedbrook has also represented Wiltshire in List A cricket. His List A debut came against Derbyshire Cricket Board in the 2001 Cheltenham & Gloucester Trophy. From 2001 to 2005 he represented the county in 4 List A matches, the last of which came against Kent in the 2005 Cheltenham & Gloucester Trophy. In his 4 matches, he scored 53 runs at an average of 53.00, with a high score of 24*. In the field he took 3 catches. With the ball he took 5 wickets at a bowling average of 32.80, with best figures of 2/49.

Bedbrook coached Surrey Stars in the Women's Cricket Super League from 2016 to 2019. He is currently the regional director of women's cricket for London and South East England, working with the South East Stars.
