= Aylish Cranstone =

English cricketer (born 1994)

Personal information
- Full name: Aylish Cranstone
- Born: 28 August 1994 (age 32); Guildford, Surrey, England
- Batting: Left-handed
- Bowling: Left-arm medium
- Role: Batter

Domestic team information
- Years: Team
- 2008–2011: Hampshire
- 2011–2016: Devon
- 2016–2019: Surrey Stars
- 2017–present: Surrey
- 2020–2024: South East Stars
- 2022: Oval Invincibles

Career statistics
| Competition | WLA | WT20 |
|---|---|---|
| Matches | 111 | 93 |
| Runs scored | 2,638 | 1,194 |
| Batting average | 27.76 | 20.94 |
| 100s/50s | 1/15 | 0/6 |
| Top score | 134* | 78* |
| Balls bowled | 883 | 153 |
| Wickets | 23 | 8 |
| Bowling average | 28.78 | 15.00 |
| 5 wickets in innings | 1 | 0 |
| 10 wickets in match | 0 | 0 |
| Best bowling | 5/5 | 3/17 |
| Catches/stumpings | 30/– | 21/– |
- Source: CricketArchive, 18 October 2024

Aylish Cranstone (born 28 August 1994) is an English cricketer who currently plays for Surrey. She plays as a left-handed batter. She has previously played for Hampshire, Devon and South East Stars, as well as playing in the Women's Cricket Super League for Surrey Stars and in The Hundred for Oval Invincibles.

== Early life ==
Cranstone was born on 28 August 1994 in Guildford, Surrey. She attended the University of Exeter.

== Domestic career ==
Cranstone made her county debut in 2008, for Hampshire against Essex, scoring a duck. In 2009 she hit her maiden county half-century, scoring 75 against Derbyshire. She was one of Hampshire's top batters during her time there, for example hitting 78* off 46 balls to complete a 9 wicket victory over Shropshire in 2010.

In 2011, Cranstone joined Devon, where she would play until the end of the 2016 season. She was the side's leading run-scorer in the 2012, 2013 and 2016 Championship seasons, and second overall in 2016. In a match in her final season for Devon against Leicestershire, Cranstone achieved her List A best bowling figures, taking 5/5 from 5 overs, as well as scoring 95 with the bat.

In 2017, Cranstone moved to Surrey. In 2018, she was their leading run-scorer in the Twenty20 Cup, with 180 runs at an average of 30.00, and was also part of the side that won promotion from Division 2 of the County Championship. She scored 55 runs in four matches in the 2021 Women's Twenty20 Cup. In March 2022, it was announced that Cranstone had been appointed as captain of Surrey for the upcoming season. She scored 62 runs for the side in the 2022 Women's Twenty20 Cup, with a high score of 40. She played two matches for the side in the 2023 Women's Twenty20 Cup.

Cranstone was also part of the Surrey Stars squad in the Women's Cricket Super League from 2016 to 2019, although she did not make her debut until 2018. She played eight matches that season, and was part of the team that beat Loughborough Lightning in the Final to claim the side's first title. She played 9 matches in 2019.

In 2020, Cranstone played for South East Stars in the Rachael Heyhoe Flint Trophy. She played all six matches, scoring 116 runs at an average of 19.33, with a best of 46 in a successful chase against Sunrisers. In December 2020, it was announced that Cranstone was one of the 41 female cricketers that had signed a full-time domestic contract. In the 2021 Rachael Heyhoe Flint Trophy, Cranstone scored 123 runs at an average of 30.75 and a best of 42*. She also played five matches in the Stars' victorious 2021 Charlotte Edwards Cup campaign, scoring 74 runs. She was part of the London Spirit squad in The Hundred, but did not play a match. In 2022, Cranstone, after having wrist surgery over the winter, was Stars' leading run-scorer, and second-highest across the entire competition, in the Charlotte Edwards Cup, with 235 runs at an average of 58.75, including three half-centuries. She also played three matches for the side in the Rachael Heyhoe Flint Trophy, and one match for Oval Invincibles in The Hundred. She also captained South East Stars in one match, against North West Thunder in the Rachael Heyhoe Flint Trophy, in the absence of regular captain and vice-captain Bryony Smith and Alice Davidson-Richards.

In 2023, she played 10 matches for South East Stars, across the Rachael Heyhoe Flint Trophy and the Charlotte Edwards Cup, with a top score of 69. She was also signed by Northern Superchargers for The Hundred, but did not play a match. In 2024, she played 23 matches for South East Stars, across the Rachael Heyhoe Flint Trophy and the Charlotte Edwards Cup, with a high score of 63*.

Cranstone has also played for England age group and development teams, as well as appearing in the 2011 Super Fours for Emeralds.
