= Laura Marsh =

English cricketer

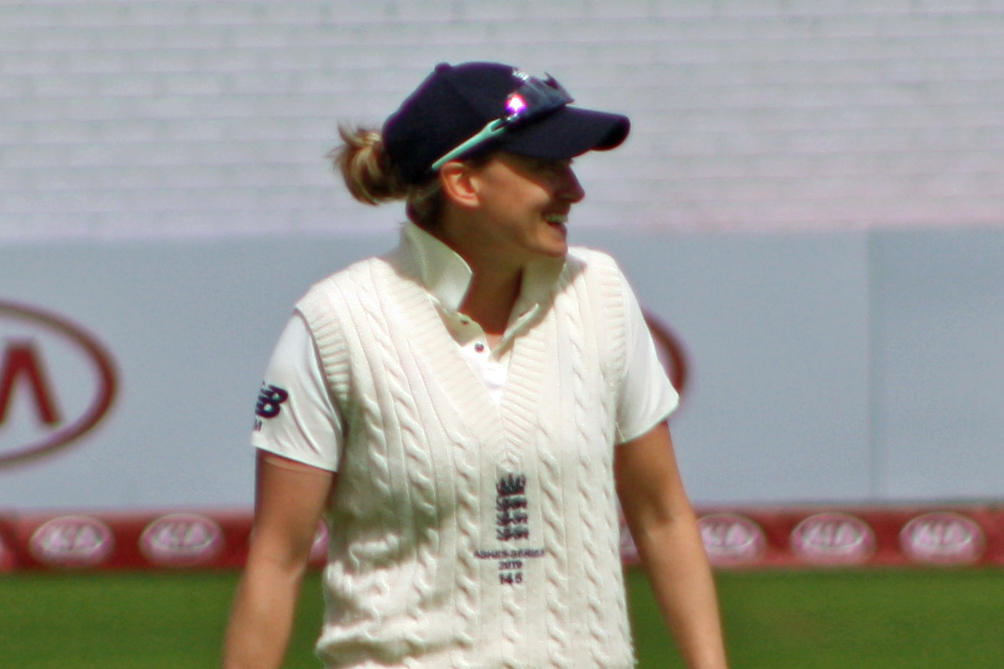
- Marsh playing for England in 2019

Personal information
- Full name: Laura Alexandra Marsh
- Born: 5 December 1986 (age 39); Pembury, Kent, England
- Nickname: Boggy
- Batting: Right-handed
- Bowling: Right-arm off break
- Role: Bowler

International information
- National side: England (2006–2019)
- Test debut (cap 146): 8 August 2006 v India
- Last Test: 18 July 2019 v Australia
- ODI debut (cap 103): 17 August 2006 v India
- Last ODI: 7 July 2019 v Australia
- ODI shirt no.: 7
- T20I debut (cap 19): 13 August 2007 v New Zealand
- Last T20I: 28 July 2019 v Australia
- T20I shirt no.: 7

Domestic team information
- Years: Team
- 2003–2011: Sussex (squad no. 7)
- 2011–2019: Kent (squad no. 7)
- 2015/16: New South Wales
- 2015/16: Sydney Sixers
- 2015/16: Otago
- 2016–2019: Surrey Stars

Career statistics
Competition	Test	ODI	T20I	LA
Matches	9	103	67	252
Runs scored	151	682	755	2,514
Batting average	12.58	13.91	16.41	18.35
100s/50s	0/1	0/1	0/1	0/11
Top score	55	67	54	80
Balls bowled	2,045	5,328	1,497	11,690
Wickets	24	129	64	301
Bowling average	33.79	26.84	20.64	22.69
5 wickets in innings	0	1	0	4
10 wickets in match	0	0	0	0
Best bowling	3/44	5/15	3/12	5/15
Catches/stumpings	4/–	25/–	7/–	68/–
- Source: CricketArchive, 14 March 2021

Laura Alexandra Marsh (born 5 December 1986) is an English former cricketer. Born in Pembury, Kent, she began playing cricket at 11 and started her career as a medium pace bowler but found greater success when she switched to off spin. She played county cricket for Kent Women, represents the Rubies and made her Test debut against India in 2006. She was part of the England team that retained the Ashes in Australia in 2008 and in England in 2009. She was also part of teams that won the Women's Cricket World Cup in 2009 and 2017. In December 2019, Marsh announced her retirement from international cricket, and announced her retirement from all forms of the game in August 2020. In April 2022, she became interim head coach of Sunrisers for the 2022 season.

== Career ==
She took a career best 5/15 against Pakistan in the 2009 Women's World Cup in Sydney and finished the competition's top wicket-taker, with 16 wickets at 10.31. She opened the bowling for England in the Twenty20 World Championship in 2009, taking 6 for 68 in the tournament which England won by defeating New Zealand at Lords, and struck the winning runs off the last ball of the match to secure England's first victory over Australia in a One Day International series in 33 years in July 2009. She made her highest Test score of 38 in a last-wicket stand of 59 against Australia in the one-off Ashes Test later the same year.

In the absence of Sarah Taylor, she opened the batting for England in the Twenty20 series against Australia in 2010 as well as opening the bowling and being named player of the match in England's series-winning win at Canberra on 16 January 2010 after scoring 45 from 44 balls, and again the following day when her 43 from 23 balls saw England post a winning total. Off the field of play, after attending Skippers Hill Manor Preparatory School and Brighton College, she took a Sports Science with Management degree at Loughborough University.

She is the holder of one of the first tranche of 18 ECB central contracts for women players, which were announced in April 2014.

Marsh was a member of the winning women's team at the 2017 Women's Cricket World Cup held in England.

In February 2019, she was awarded a full central contract by the England and Wales Cricket Board (ECB) for 2019. In June 2019, Marsh played in her 100th Women's One Day International (WODI) match, during the series against the West Indies. Later the same month, the ECB named her in England's squad for their opening match against Australia to contest the Women's Ashes.
