= List of Trent Rockets cricketers =

Trent Rockets were formed in 2019, and played their first Hundred match in the 2021 season of The Hundred against Southern Brave for both the Men's team and the Women's team. Hundred matches are classed as Twenty20 matches and so have Twenty20 status or Women's Twenty20 status. The players in this list have all played at least one Hundred match for the Trent Rockets Men's or Women's team.

Players are listed in order of appearance, where players made their debut in the same match, they are ordered by batting order. Players in Bold were overseas players for the Trent Rockets.

== Key ==
**General**

- ♠ – Captain
- † – Wicket-keeper
- **First** – Year of debut for Trent Rockets
- **Last** – Year of latest match played for Trent Rockets
- **Mat** – Number of matches played for Trent Rockets
- **Win%** – Winning percentage

**Batting**

- **Inn** – Number of innings batted
- **NO** – Number of innings not out
- **Runs** – Runs scored in career
- **HS** – Highest score
- **100** – Centuries scored
- **50** – Half-centuries scored
- **Avg** – Runs scored per dismissal
- * – Batsman remained not out

**Bowling**

- **Balls** – Balls bowled in career
- **Wkt** – Wickets taken in career
- **BBI** – Best bowling in an innings
- **BBM** – Best bowling in a match
- **Ave** – Average runs per wicket

**Fielding**

- **Ca** – Catches taken
- **St** – Stumpings effected

== List of players ==
=== Women's players ===
No.	Name	Nationality	First	Last	Mat	Runs	HS	Avg	Balls	Wkt	BBI	Ave	Ca	St
No.	Name	Nationality	First	Last	Mat	Batting			Bowling				Fielding	
1	**Rachel Priest** †	New Zealand	2021	2021	8	138	76	19.71	0	0	–	–	1	5
2	**Sammy-Jo Johnson**	Australia	2021	2021	8	120	33	17.14	134	15	4/15	10.26	5	0
3	Nat Sciver-Brunt ♠	England	2021	2026	43	1,420	81*	45.80	317	15	2/16	30.37	15	0
4	Katherine Sciver-Brunt	England	2021	2023	19	176	43*	16.00	317	10	2/14	35.50	7	0
5	**Heather Graham**	Australia	2021	2025	24	299	44*	19.93	370	22	3/13	20.00	5	0
6	Abbey Freeborn †	England	2021	2022	15	109	45*	18.16	0	0	–	–	3	1
7	Sarah Glenn	England	2021	2022	15	55	23*	7.85	230	10	2/14	31.10	9	0
8	Kathryn Bryce	Scotland	2021	2022	14	22	12*	11.00	123	4	2/2	42.00	3	0
9	Lucy Higham	England	2021	2021	6	–	–	–	15	2	2/12	6.00	1	0
10	Michaela Kirk	South Africa	2021	2021	3	–	–	–	0	0	–	–	1	0
11	Teresa Graves	England	2021	2021	2	4	4	4.00	0	0	–	–	0	0
12	Emily Windsor	England	2021	2021	5	2	2*	–	0	0	–	–	2	0
13	Nancy Harman	England	2021	2021	3	–	–	–	0	0	–	–	1	0
14	Georgia Davis	England	2021	2022	10	3	3*	–	55	4	2/29	16.75	0	0
15	Bryony Smith	England	2022	2025	30	617	70	20.57	245	14	3/21	24.50	4	0
16	**Elyse Villani** ♠	Australia	2022	2022	7	182	55*	30.33	0	0	–	–	4	0
17	Marie Kelly	England	2022	2022	7	40	22	8.00	5	0	–	–	2	0
18	**Mignon du Preez**	South Africa	2022	2022	7	67	32*	11.16	0	0	–	–	0	0
19	**Alana King**	Australia	2022	2025	30	128	24*	8.53	559	28	4/15	23.46	6	0
20	Sophie Munro	England	2022	2022	4	–	–	–	0	0	–	–	2	0
21	**Lizelle Lee** †	South Africa	2023	2023	7	165	61	27.50	0	0	–	–	3	3
22	Naomi Dattani	England	2023	2023	7	32	13	8.00	70	3	1/14	42.00	0	0
23	**Harmanpreet Kaur**	India	2023	2023	7	72	22*	14.40	0	0	–	–	1	0
24	Fran Wilson	England	2023	2023	7	44	22	7.33	0	0	–	–	2	0
25	Jo Gardner	England	2023	2023	7	57	17*	11.40	5	0	–	–	5	0
26	Alexa Stonehouse	England	2023	2025	21	26	16*	26.00	270	11	2/10	29.73	6	0
27	Kirstie Gordon	England	2023	2025	23	36	32	36.00	420	24	4/15	21.63	4	0
28	Grace Potts	England	2023	2024	3	–	–	–	15	0	–	–	0	0
29	Cassidy McCarthy	England	2023	2025	9	0	0	0.00	128	3	1/18	57.67	4	0
30	Grace Scrivens	England	2024	2025	13	215	55	16.54	0	0	–	–	3	0
31	**Ashleigh Gardner** ♠	Australia	2024	2026	25	470	61	22.38	432	29	4/16	18.82	11	0
32	Katie George	England	2024	2024	8	32	9	8.00	10	0	–	–	1	0
33	Nat Wraith †	England	2024	2025	13	128	28	11.63	0	0	–	–	3	5
34	Josie Groves	England	2024	2024	8	7	7*	7.00	0	0	–	–	0	0
35	Emma Jones	England	2025	2026	6	21	12	5.25	0	0	–	–	6	0
36	Jodi Grewcock	England	2025	2025	6	52	21*	26.00	0	0	–	–	0	0
37	Ellie Threlkeld †	England	2025	2025	4	4	2*	2.00	0	0	–	–	0	5
38	Sophia Dunkley	England	2026	2026	9	301	65	37.62	0	0	–	–	6	0
39	**Beth Mooney** †	Australia	2026	2026	9	163	57	23.28	0	0	–	–	3	6
40	Sophie Luff	England	2026	2026	9	119	51	29.75	0	0	–	–	1	0
41	Georgia Adams	England	2026	2026	9	36	20*	12.00	82	6	2/9	13.50	1	0
42	Bess Heath	England	2026	2026	9	74	31*	24.66	0	0	–	–	2	0
43	Georgia Elwiss	England	2026	2026	9	37	13	18.50	140	6	3/13	30.16	0	0
44	**Kim Garth**	Australia	2026	2026	9	8	4*	8.00	170	9	4/23	21.66	1	0
45	**Samantha Bates**	Australia	2026	2026	9	–	–	–	176	13	3/10	14.46	2	0
46	Katie Levick	England	2026	2026	3	2	2	2.00	35	2	1/8	21.00	1	0
47	Charley Phillips	England	2026	2026	7	–	–	–	110	9	2/12	13.55	2	0

=== Men's players ===
No.	Name	Nationality	First	Last	Mat	Runs	HS	Avg	Balls	Wkt	BBI	Ave	Ca	St
No.	Name	Nationality	First	Last	Mat	Batting			Bowling				Fielding	
1	**D'Arcy Short**	Australia	2021	2021	9	156	69*	26.00	20	0	–	–	3	0
2	Alex Hales	England	2021	2024	33	736	68	23.00	0	0	–	–	12	0
3	Dawid Malan	England	2021	2023	22	619	98*	32.57	0	0	–	–	4	0
4	Joe Root	England	2021	2025	26	527	76	26.35	120	6	2/24	23.50	14	0
5	Tom Moores †	England	2021	2025	18	162	55	18.00	0	0	–	–	12	4
6	Lewis Gregory ♠	England	2021	2026	42	369	35*	24.60	449	21	3/19	32.42	12	0
7	Steven Mullaney	England	2021	2021	6	92	49	18.40	25	2	1/9	15.50	3	0
8	Samit Patel	England	2021	2023	20	238	46*	23.80	294	21	3/20	19.09	3	0
9	**Rashid Khan**	Afghanistan	2021	2024	16	90	25	10.00	310	24	4/24	18.29	8	0
10	Luke Wood	England	2021	2024	28	20	10*	10.00	448	25	3/17	26.12	9	0
11	**Marchant de Lange**	South Africa	2021	2021	7	14	7*	14.00	119	12	5/20	13.08	2	0
12	Matt Carter	England	2021	2023	13	37	14	7.40	210	12	3/17	24.41	5	0
13	Timm van der Gugten	Netherlands	2021	2021	3	1	1*	–	15	1	1/29	51.00	0	0
14	**Wahab Riaz**	Pakistan	2021	2021	1	–	–	–	20	4	4/30	7.50	1	0
15	Sam Cook	England	2021	2025	31	5	4*	5.00	544	36	4/18	22.36	12	0
16	**Colin Munro**	New Zealand	2022	2023	16	427	67*	38.81	0	0	–	–	4	0
17	Tom Kohler-Cadmore †	England	2022	2023	16	279	64	17.43	0	0	–	–	5	2
18	**Daniel Sams**	Australia	2022	2023	16	233	55*	25.88	291	19	3/17	25.36	5	0
19	Luke Fletcher	England	2022	2022	2	–	–	–	25	2	2/22	22.50	1	0
20	**Tabraiz Shamsi**	South Africa	2022	2022	6	–	–	–	105	5	2/12	28.60	0	0
21	Ian Cockbain	England	2022	2022	2	26	20*	26.00	0	0	–	–	0	0
22	Sam Hain	England	2023	2025	16	247	63	27.44	0	0	–	–	5	0
23	**Imad Wasim**	Pakistan	2023	2024	10	64	29	16.00	175	10	2/15	18.70	2	0
24	**Ish Sodhi**	New Zealand	2023	2023	5	–	–	–	87	4	2/29	33.75	2	0
25	John Turner	England	2023	2024	5	1	1	1.00	65	6	3/24	13.33	0	0
26	Adam Lyth	England	2024	2024	4	41	16	10.25	5	0	–	–	1	0
27	Tom Banton †	England	2024	2026	22	598	67	29.90	0	0	–	–	8	1
28	**Rovman Powell**	West Indies	2024	2024	8	149	45	21.28	0	0	–	–	2	0
29	**Chris Green**	Australia	2024	2024	3	34	25*	34.00	50	3	3/14	19.33	2	0
30	Ollie Robinson	England	2024	2024	1	–	–	–	10	0	–	–	0	0
31	Jordan Thompson	England	2024	2024	3	4	4*	2.00	35	1	1/17	47.00	1	0
32	Tom Alsop †	England	2024	2025	5	107	51	53.50	0	0	–	–	1	0
33	Calvin Harrison	England	2024	2026	11	14	12*	14.00	155	10	2/25	23.70	6	0
34	Rehan Ahmed	England	2025	2025	10	189	45*	23.62	150	12	3/15	15.91	3	0
35	Max Holden	England	2025	2025	8	65	22*	13.00	0	0	–	–	7	0
36	**Marcus Stoinis**	Australia	2025	2025	10	146	64	29.20	145	12	2/0	19.66	2	0
37	Adam Hose	England	2025	2025	4	23	9*	23.00	0	0	–	–	1	0
38	David Willey ♠	England	2025	2025	10	35	14	5.83	170	9	3/11	25.77	3	0
39	**Akeal Hosein**	West Indies	2025	2025	3	1	1*	–	55	3	2/28	24.00	0	0
40	**Lockie Ferguson**	New Zealand	2025	2025	8	–	–	–	135	7	3/20	27.71	4	0
41	Callum Parkinson	England	2025	2025	1	–	–	–	20	1	1/29	29.00	0	0
42	**George Linde**	South Africa	2025	2025	6	47	25	11.75	85	2	2/12	52.00	1	0
43	Ben Sanderson	England	2025	2026	6	–	–	–	97	4	2/26	38.25	0	0
44	Ben Cox †	England	2025	2025	3	17	17*	–	0	0	–	–	3	0
45	Ross Whiteley	England	2025	2025	2	14	14	14.00	0	0	–	–	0	0
46	Dillon Pennington	England	2025	2025	1	–	–	–	20	1	1/23	23.00	0	0
47	Ben Duckett	England	2026	2026	9	337	75	42.12	0	0	–	–	4	0
48	**Finn Allen**	New Zealand	2026	2026	9	217	72*	27.12	0	0	–	–	3	0
49	**Tim David**	Australia	2026	2026	9	90	32*	18.00	1	0	–	–	5	0
50	Sam Billings ♠†	England	2026	2026	9	117	31*	16.71	0	0	–	–	4	0
51	**Mitchell Santner**	New Zealand	2026	2026	9	146	52*	146.00	155	6	3/35	34.83	3	0
52	Craig Overton	England	2026	2026	9	35	25*	35.00	160	8	3/23	26.25	10	0
53	**Matt Henry**	New Zealand	2026	2026	8	–	–	–	125	5	2/16	46.60	1	0
54	Mohammad Amir	Pakistan	2026	2026	7	–	–	–	124	9	3/29	18.11	1	0
55	Aneurin Donald	England	2026	2026	5	137	40	27.40	0	0	–	–	2	0

== See also ==
- Trent Rockets
- The Hundred
