= 2022 Trent Rockets season =

Trent Rockets
2021 season
- Coach: (Zimbabwe) Andy Flower (Men's team) (England) Salliann Briggs (Women's team)
- Captain: (England) Lewis Gregory (Men's team) (England) Nat Sciver (Women's team)
- Overseas player: (South Africa) Marchant de Lange; AFG Rashid Khan (New Zealand) Colin Munro (Australia) Daniel Sams (South Africa) Tabraiz Shamsi (Men's team) (South Africa) Mignon du Preez (Republic of Ireland) Kim Garth (Australia) Alana King (Australia) Meg Lanning (Australia) Elyse Villani (Women's team)
- Ground(s): Trent Bridge
- The Hundred (Men's): Winners
- The Hundred (Women's): 3rd
- Most runs: Dawid Malan: 377 (Men's team); Nat Sciver: 228 (Women's team)
- Most wickets: Samit Patel: 13 (Men's team); Bryony Smith: 9 (Women's team)

The 2022 season was the Trent Rockets second season of the 100 ball franchise cricket, The Hundred. The franchise had a positive season with both teams making it to the knockout stages. While the women's team were knockout in the semi-final to finish in 3rd place, the men's team won the group stage and won in the final to win their first title.

== Players ==
=== Men's side ===
- **Bold** denotes players with international caps.

S/N	Name	Nat.	Date of birth (age)	Batting style	Bowling style	Notes
Batters
1	Ian Cockbain	(England)	17 February 1987 (age 38)	Right-handed	Right-arm medium	
10	**Alex Hales**	(England)	3 January 1989 (age 36)	Right-handed	Right-arm medium	
29	**Dawid Malan**	(England)	3 September 1987 (age 38)	Left-handed	Right-arm leg break	Centrally Contracted player
66	**Joe Root**	(England)	30 December 1990 (age 34)	Right-handed	Right-arm off break	Centrally Contracted player
82	**Colin Munro**	(New Zealand)	11 March 1987 (age 38)	Left-handed	Right-arm medium	Overseas player
All Rounders
5	Steven Mullaney	(England)	19 November 1986 (age 39)	Right-handed	Right-arm medium	
8	Ben Mike	(England)	24 August 1998 (age 27)	Right-handed	Right-arm fast-medium	Wildcard player
21	**Samit Patel**	(England)	30 November 1984 (age 41)	Right-handed	Slow left-arm orthodox	
24	**Lewis Gregory**	(England)	24 May 1992 (age 33)	Right-handed	Right-arm fast-medium	Captain
Wicketkeepers
7	Tom Moores	(England)	4 September 1996 (age 29)	Left-handed	—	
32	Tom Kohler-Cadmore	(England)	19 August 1994 (age 31)	Right-handed	Right-arm off break	
Pace bowlers
14	Luke Wood	(England)	2 August 1995 (age 30)	Left-handed	Left-arm fast-medium	
16	Sam Cook	(England)	4 August 1997 (age 28)	Right-handed	Right-arm fast-medium	
22	Luke Fletcher	(England)	18 September 1988 (age 37)	Right-handed	Right-arm fast-medium	
90	**Marchant de Lange**	(South Africa)	13 October 1990 (age 35)	Right-handed	Right-arm fast	Overseas player
95	**Daniel Sams**	(Australia)	27 October 1992 (age 33)	Right-handed	Left-arm fast-medium	Overseas player
Spin bowlers
19	**Rashid Khan**	(Afghanistan)	20 September 1998 (age 27)	Right-handed	Right-arm leg break	Overseas player; Ruled out
20	Matt Carter	(England)	26 May 1996 (age 29)	Right-handed	Right-arm off break	
26	**Tabraiz Shamsi**	(South Africa)	18 February 1990 (age 35)	Right-handed	Slow left-arm unorthodox	Overseas player; Replacement player; Ruled out

==== Women's side ====
- **Bold** denotes players with international caps.

S/N	Name	Nat.	Date of birth (age)	Batting style	Bowling style	Notes
Batters
6	**Elyse Villani**	(Australia)	6 October 1989 (age 36)	Right-handed	Right-arm medium	Overseas player
22	**Mignon du Preez**	(South Africa)	13 June 1989 (age 36)	Right-handed	—	Overseas player
23	Marie Kelly	(England)	9 February 1996 (age 29)	Right-handed	Right-arm medium	
—	**Meg Lanning**	(Australia)	25 March 1992 (age 33)	Right-handed	Right-arm medium	Overseas player; Ruled out
All Rounders
4	**Bryony Smith**	(England)	12 December 1997 (age 28)	Right-handed	Right-arm off break	
10	**Nat Sciver**	(England)	20 August 1992 (age 33)	Right-handed	Right-arm medium	Captain; Centrally Contracted player
17	**Kathryn Bryce**	(Scotland)	17 November 1997 (age 28)	Right-handed	Right-arm medium	
—	**Kim Garth**	(Ireland)	25 April 1996 (age 29)	Right-handed	Right-arm medium	Overseas player; Replacement player
Wicketkeepers
27	Abigail Freeborn	(England)	12 November 1996 (age 29)	Right-handed	–	
—	Ella Claridge	(England)	2002 or 2003 (age 22–23)	Right-handed	Right-arm medium	
Pace bowlers
2	**Katherine Brunt**	(England)	2 July 1985 (age 40)	Right-handed	Right-arm fast-medium	
32	Alexa Stonehouse	(England)	12 May 2004 (age 21)	Left-handed	Left-arm medium	
44	Sophie Munro	(England)	31 August 2001 (age 24)	Right-handed	Right-arm medium	
Spin bowlers
3	**Sarah Glenn**	(England)	27 August 1999 (age 26)	Right-handed	Right-arm leg break	
12	**Alana King**	(Australia)	22 November 1995 (age 30)	Right-handed	Right-arm leg break	Overseas player
64	Georgia Davis	(England)	3 June 1999 (age 26)	Right-handed	Right-arm off break	
—	Emma Marlow	(England)	12 April 2004 (age 21)	Right-handed	Right-arm off break	

== Regular season ==
=== Fixtures (Men) ===
6 August 2022
14:30
Scorecard

Birmingham Phoenix; 143/7 (100 balls)	v	Trent Rockets (H); 147/4 (97 balls)
Liam Livingstone 47 (28); Daniel Sams 3/24 (20 balls)		Alex Hales 58 (41); Tom Helm 2/11 (12 balls)

Trent Rockets won by 6 wickets
Trent Bridge, Nottingham
Umpires: Peter Hartley (Eng) and Steve O'Shaughnessy (Eng)
Player of the match: Alex Hales (Trent Rockets)

- Trent Rockets won the toss and elected to field.
- Points: Trent Rockets 2, Birmingham Phoenix 0.

9 August 2022
18:30 (N)
Scorecard

(H) Northern Superchargers; 152/8 (100 balls)	v	Trent Rockets; 155/3 (94 balls)
David Wiese 50 (27); Daniel Sams 3/31 (20 balls)		Dawid Malan 88* (49); Dwayne Bravo 1/28 (20 balls)

Trent Rockets won by 7 wickets
Headingley, Leeds
Umpires: Ian Blackwell (Eng) and David Millns (Eng)
Player of the match: Dawid Malan (Trent Rockets)

- Trent Rockets won the toss and elected to field.
- Points: Trent Rockets 2, Northern Superchargers 0.

13 August 2022
14:30
Scorecard

(H) Manchester Originals; 189/3 (100 balls)	v	Trent Rockets; 193/2 (94 balls)
Phil Salt 70* (46); Samit Patel 2/20 (20 balls)		Dawid Malan 98* (44); Tom Hartley 1/24 (20 balls)

Trent Rockets won by 8 wickets
Old Trafford, Manchester
Umpires: Nigel Llong (Eng) and Steve O'Shaughnessy (Eng)
Player of the match: Dawid Malan (Trent Rockets)

- Trent Rockets won the toss and elected to field.
- Points: Trent Rockets 2, Manchester Originals 0.

15 August 2022
18:30 (N)
Scorecard

Trent Rockets; 145/6 (100 balls)	v	Birmingham Phoenix (H); 149/3 (86 balls)
Daniel Sams 55* (25); Benny Howell 3/28 (20 balls)		Moeen Ali 52 (28); Luke Wood 3/17 (20 balls)

Birmingham Phoenix won by 7 wickets
Edgbaston, Birmingham
Umpires: Tom Lungley (Eng) and Martin Saggers (Eng)
Player of the match: Moeen Ali (Birmingham Phoenix)

- Birmingham Phoenix won the toss and elected to field.
- Points: Birmingham Phoenix 2, Trent Rockets 0.

17 August 2022
19:00 (N)
Scorecard

(H) Trent Rockets; 181/4 (100 balls)	v	Oval Invincibles; 156/5 (100 balls)
Alex Hales 59 (29); Mohammad Hasnain 2/28 (15 balls)		Jordan Cox 61* (33); Tabraiz Shamsi 2/21 (20 balls)

Trent Rockets won by 25 runs
Trent Bridge, Nottingham
Umpires: Richard Kettleborough (Eng) and Neil Mallender (Eng)
Player of the match: Alex Hales (Trent Rockets)

- Oval Invincibles won the toss and elected to field.
- Points: Trent Rockets 2, Oval Invincibles 0.

20 August 2022
19:00 (N)
Scorecard

London Spirit; 122 (93 balls)	v	Trent Rockets (H); 127/4 (79 balls)
Ben McDermott 30 (25); Rashid Khan 3/25 (20 balls)		Colin Munro 67* (37); Chris Wood 1/19 (15 balls)

Trent Rockets won by 6 wickets
Trent Bridge, Nottingham
Umpires: Paul Pollard (Eng) and Martin Saggers (Eng)
Player of the match: Colin Munro (Trent Rockets)

- Trent Rockets won the toss and elected to field.
- Points: Trent Rockets 2, London Spirit 0.

25 August 2022
19:00 (N)
Scorecard

Trent Rockets; 138/6 (100 balls)	v	Southern Brave (H); 142/4 (95 balls)
Dawid Malan 59 (41); James Fuller 2/18 (20 balls)		Alex Davies 51* (43); Sam Cook 2/25 (20 balls)

Southern Brave won by 6 wickets
Rose Bowl, Southampton
Umpires: Billy Taylor (Eng) and Alex Wharf (Eng)
Player of the match: Alex Davies (Southern Brave)

- Southern Brave won the toss and elected to field.
- Points: Southern Brave 2, Trent Rockets 0.

29 August 2022
19:00 (N)
Scorecard

(H) Trent Rockets; 172/4 (100 balls)	v	Welsh Fire; 143/6 (100 balls)
Dawid Malan 58 (37); Jake Ball 1/25 (20 balls)		Matt Critchley 55* (35); Tabraiz Shamsi 2/12 (20 balls)

Trent Rockets won by 29 runs
Trent Bridge, Nottingham
Umpires: Ian Blackwell (Eng) and Graham Lloyd (Eng)
Player of the match: Dawid Malan (Trent Rockets)

- Welsh Fire won the toss and elected to field.
- Points: Trent Rockets 2, Welsh Fire 0.

== Fixtures (Women) ==
Due to the shortened women's competition, Trent Rockets didn't play against Northern Superchargers

.

13 August 2022
11:00
Scorecard

Trent Rockets; 119/5 (100 balls)	v	Manchester Originals (H); 76 (87 balls)
Abigail Freeborn 45* (38); Deandra Dottin 2/21 (20 balls)		Lizelle Lee 17 (13); Alana King 4/15 (20 balls)

Trent Rockets won by 43 runs
Old Trafford, Manchester
Umpires: Sue Redfern (Eng) and Billy Taylor (Eng)
Player of the match: Alana King (Trent Rockets)

- Manchester Originals won the toss and elected to field.
- Points: Trent Rockets 2, Manchester Originals 0.

15 August 2022
15:00
Scorecard

Trent Rockets; 116/9 (100 balls)	v	Birmingham Phoenix (H); 117/2 (91 balls)
Elyse Villani 33 (25); Emily Arlott 3/19 (20 balls)		Amy Jones 44* (32); Alana King 1/18 (20 balls)

Birmingham Phoenix won by 8 wickets
Edgbaston, Birmingham
Umpires: Paul Baldwin (Eng) and Anna Harris (Eng)
Player of the match: Amy Jones (Birmingham Phoenix)

- Birmingham Phoenix won the toss and elected to field.
- Points: Birmingham Phoenix 2, Trent Rockets 0.

17 August 2022
15:30
Scorecard

(H) Trent Rockets; 112/8 (100 balls)	v	Oval Invincibles; 115/5 (99 balls)
Nat Sciver 59* (48); Eva Gray 2/16 (20 balls)		Suzie Bates 41 (32); Bryony Smith 3/21 (19 balls)

Oval Invincibles won by 5 wickets
Trent Bridge, Nottingham
Umpires: James Middlebrook (Eng) and Sue Redfern (Eng)
Player of the match: Suzie Bates (Oval Invincibles)

- Oval Invincibles won the toss and elected to field.
- Points: Oval Invincibles 2, Trent Rockets 0.

20 August 2022
15:30
Scorecard

(H) Trent Rockets; 142/4 (100 balls)	v	London Spirit; 124/6 (100 balls)
Bryony Smith 63 (44); Amelia Kerr 2/23 (20 balls)		Naomi Dattani 38* (34); Nat Sciver 2/20 (15 balls)

Trent Rockets won by 18 runs
Trent Bridge, Nottingham
Umpires: Neil Bainton (Eng) and Sarah Bartlett (Eng)
Player of the match: Bryony Smith (Trent Rockets)

- London Spirit won the toss and elected to field.
- Points: Trent Rockets 2, London Spirit 0.

25 August 2022
15:30
Scorecard

Trent Rockets; 88/8 (100 balls)	v	Southern Brave (H); 94/0 (56 balls)
Elyse Villani 25 (25); Lauren Bell 4/10 (20 balls)		Smriti Mandhana 57* (31)

Southern Brave won by 10 wickets
Rose Bowl, Southampton
Umpires: Sarah Bartlett (Eng) and Neil Pratt (Eng)
Player of the match: Lauren Bell (Southern Brave)

- Southern Brave won the toss and elected to field.
- Points: Southern Brave 2, Trent Rockets 0.

29 August 2022
15:30
Scorecard

Welsh Fire; 100/8 (100 balls)	v	Trent Rockets (H); 102/2 (82 balls)
Nicola Carey 27 (29); Bryony Smith 2/14 (15 balls)		Elyse Villani 55* (40); Lauren Filer 1/13 (20 balls)

Trent Rockets won by 8 wickets
Trent Bridge, Nottingham
Umpires: Neil Bainton (Eng) and Sue Redfern (Eng)
Player of the match: Elyse Villani (Trent Rockets)

- Welsh Fire won the toss and elected to bat.
- Points: Trent Rockets 2, Welsh Fire 0.

== Standings ==
=== Women ===
Pos	Team	Pld	W	L	T	NR	Pts	NRR
1	Oval Invincibles	6	5	1	0	0	10	1.098
2	Southern Brave	6	5	1	0	0	10	0.806
3	Trent Rockets	6	3	3	0	0	6	0.101
4	Birmingham Phoenix	6	3	3	0	0	6	−0.031
5	Northern Superchargers	6	3	3	0	0	6	−0.119
6	Manchester Originals	6	2	4	0	0	4	−0.478
7	London Spirit	6	2	4	0	0	4	−0.557
8	Welsh Fire	6	1	5	0	0	2	−0.681

Source: BBC Sport, ESPN Cricinfo

advances to Final
advances to the Eliminator

=== Men ===
Pos	Team	Pld	W	L	T	NR	Pts	NRR
1	Trent Rockets	8	6	2	0	0	12	0.576
2	Manchester Originals	8	5	3	0	0	10	0.908
3	London Spirit	8	5	3	0	0	10	0.338
4	Birmingham Phoenix	8	5	3	0	0	10	−0.172
5	Oval Invincibles	8	4	4	0	0	8	0.385
6	Northern Superchargers	8	4	4	0	0	8	0.009
7	Southern Brave	8	3	5	0	0	6	−0.593
8	Welsh Fire	8	0	8	0	0	0	−1.442

Source: BBC Sport, ESPN Cricinfo

advances to Final
advances to the Eliminator

== Knockout stages ==
=== Men ===
==== Final ====
3 September 2022
18:30 (N)
Scorecard

Manchester Originals; 120/9 (100 balls)	v	Trent Rockets; 121/8 (98 balls)
Ashton Turner 26 (13); Sam Cook 4/18 (20 balls)		Dawid Malan 19 (18); Josh Little 2/18 (20 balls)

Trent Rockets won by 2 wickets
Lord's, London
Umpires: Mike Burns (Eng) and Martin Saggers (Eng)
Player of the match: Sam Cook (Trent Rockets)

- Manchester Originals won the toss and elected to bat.

=== Women ===
==== Eliminator ====
2 September 2022
15:00
Scorecard

Southern Brave; 134/6 (100 balls)	v	Trent Rockets; 132/7 (100 balls)
Georgia Adams 38 (24); Bryony Smith 2/28 (15 balls)		Nat Sciver 72* (36); Georgia Adams 2/15 (15 balls)

Southern Brave won by 2 runs
Rose Bowl, Southampton
Umpires: Anna Harris (Eng) and Steve O'Shaughnessy (Eng)
Player of the match: Tahlia McGrath (Southern Brave)

- Trent Rockets won the toss and elected to field.
