= 2021 Trent Rockets season =

Trent Rockets
2021 season
- Coach: (Zimbabwe) Andy Flower (Men's team) (England) Salliann Briggs (Women's team)
- Captain: (England) Lewis Gregory (Men's team) (England) Nat Sciver (Women's team)
- Overseas player: (South Africa) Marchant de Lange; AFG Rashid Khan (Australia) D'Arcy Short (Pakistan) Wahab Riaz (Men's team) (Australia) Heather Graham (Australia) Sammy-Jo Johnson (New Zealand) Rachel Priest (Women's team)
- Ground(s): Trent Bridge
- The Hundred (Men's): 3rd
- The Hundred (Women's): 7th
- Most runs: Nat Sciver: 220 (Women's team); Dawid Malan: 214 (Men's team)
- Most wickets: Sammy-Jo Johnson: 15 (Women's team); Marchant de Lange: 12 (Men's team)
- Most catches: Rashid Khan: 5 (Men's team); Sammy-Jo Johnson: 5 (Women's team)

The 2021 season was the Trent Rockets first season of the new franchise 100 ball cricket, The Hundred.

== Players ==
=== Men's side ===
- **Bold** denotes players with international caps.

S/N	Name	Nat.	Date of birth (age)	Batting style	Bowling style	Notes
Batsmen
6	**Luke Wright**	(England)	7 March 1985 (age 40)	Right-handed	Right-arm medium	
10	**Alex Hales**	(England)	3 January 1989 (age 36)	Right-handed	Right-arm medium	Local Icon player
23	**D'Arcy Short**	(Australia)	9 August 1990 (age 35)	Left-handed	Slow left-arm unorthodox	Overseas player
29	**Dawid Malan**	(England)	3 September 1987 (age 38)	Left-handed	Right-arm leg break	
66	**Joe Root**	(England)	30 December 1990 (age 34)	Right-handed	Right-arm off break	Centrally Contracted player
—	Jack Leaning	(England)	18 October 1993 (age 32)	Right-handed	Right-arm off break	Replacement player
All Rounders
5	Steven Mullaney	(England)	19 November 1986 (age 39)	Right-handed	Right-arm medium	
21	**Samit Patel**	(England)	30 November 1984 (age 41)	Right-handed	Slow left-arm orthodox	
24	**Lewis Gregory**	(England)	24 May 1992 (age 33)	Right-handed	Right-arm fast-medium	Captain
Wicketkeepers
7	Tom Moores	(England)	4 September 1996 (age 29)	Left-handed	—	
9	Ben Cox	(England)	2 February 1992 (age 33)	Right-handed	—	
Pace bowlers
14	Luke Wood	(England)	2 August 1995 (age 30)	Left-handed	Left-arm fast-medium	
16	Sam Cook	(England)	4 August 1997 (age 28)	Right-handed	Right-arm fast-medium	Wildcard pick
47	**Wahab Riaz**	(Pakistan)	28 June 1985 (age 40)	Right-handed	Left-arm fast	Overseas player
64	**Timm van der Gugten**	(Netherlands)	25 February 1991 (age 34)	Right-handed	Right-arm fast-medium	
90	**Marchant de Lange**	(South Africa)	13 October 1990 (age 35)	Right-handed	Right-arm fast	Overseas player; Replacement player
—	Sonny Baker	(England)	13 March 2003 (age 22)	Right-handed	Right-arm fast-medium	Replacement player
Spin bowlers
19	**Rashid Khan**	(Afghanistan)	20 September 1998 (age 27)	Right-handed	Right-arm leg break	Overseas player
20	Matt Carter	(England)	26 May 1996 (age 29)	Right-handed	Right-arm off break	

=== Women's side ===
- **Bold** denotes players with international caps.

S/N	Name	Nat.	Date of birth (age)	Batting style	Bowling style	Notes
Batters
44	Emily Windsor	(England)	14 September 1997 (age 28)	Right-handed	Right-arm medium	
—	Ella Claridge	(England)		Right-handed	Right-arm medium	
All Rounders
10	**Nat Sciver**	(England)	20 August 1992 (age 33)	Right-handed	Right-arm medium	Captain; Centrally Contracted player
11	**Heather Graham**	(Australia)	5 October 1996 (age 29)	Right-handed	Right-arm medium	Overseas player
17	**Kathryn Bryce**	(Scotland)	17 November 1997 (age 28)	Right-handed	Right-arm medium	
22	Teresa Graves	(England)	10 October 1998 (age 27)	Right-handed	Right-arm medium	
25	Michaela Kirk	(South Africa)	30 June 1999 (age 26)	Right-handed	Right-arm off break	UK passport
—	Alicia Presland	(England)	28 September 1999 (age 26)	Right-handed	Right-arm medium	
Wicketkeepers
13	**Rachel Priest**	(New Zealand)	13 June 1985 (age 40)	Right-handed	—	Overseas player
27	Abigail Freeborn	(England)	12 November 1996 (age 29)	Right-handed	–	
Pace bowlers
2	**Katherine Brunt**	(England)	2 July 1985 (age 40)	Right-handed	Right-arm fast-medium	
58	Sammy-Jo Johnson	(Australia)	5 November 1992 (age 33)	Right-handed	Right-arm medium	Overseas player
Spin bowlers
3	**Sarah Glenn**	(England)	27 August 1999 (age 26)	Right-handed	Right-arm leg break	
7	Lucy Higham	(England)	17 October 1997 (age 28)	Right-handed	Right-arm off break	
16	Nancy Harman	(England)	11 July 1999 (age 26)	Right-handed	Right-arm leg break	
64	Georgia Davis	(England)	3 June 1999 (age 26)	Right-handed	Right-arm off break	Replacement player

== Regular season ==
=== Fixtures (Men) ===
==== July ====
24 July 2021
14:30
Scorecard

Southern Brave; 126/8 (100 balls)	v	Trent Rockets; 127/1 (82 balls)
Ross Whiteley 39* (29); Marchant de Lange 5/20 (20 balls)		Dawid Malan 62* (43); George Garton 1/29 (15 balls)

Trent Rockets won by 9 wickets
Trent Bridge, Nottingham
Attendance: 12,783
Umpires: David Millns and Russell Warren
Player of the match: Marchant de Lange (Trent Rockets)

- Southern Brave won the toss and elected to bat.
- Points: Trent Rockets 2, Southern Brave 0.

26 July 2021
18:30 (N)
Scorecard

Northern Superchargers; 132 (99 balls)	v	Trent Rockets; 134/8 (94 balls)
John Simpson 42 (33); Marchant de Lange 3/22 (14 balls)		Alex Hales 40* (34); Callum Parkinson 2/19 (15 balls)

Trent Rockets won by 2 wickets
Trent Bridge, Nottingham
Attendance: 11,483
Umpires: Tim Robinson and Russell Warren
Player of the match: Rashid Khan (Trent Rockets)

- Northern Superchargers won the toss and elected to bat.
- Points: Trent Rockets 2, Northern Superchargers 0.

29 July 2021
18:30 (N)
Scorecard

Trent Rockets; 123/4 (100 balls)	v	London Spirit; 116/8 (100 balls)
D'Arcy Short 69* (47); Mohammad Nabi 2/20 (20 balls)		Roelof van der Merwe 25* (18); Matt Carter 3/17 (20 balls)

Trent Rockets won by 7 runs
Lord's, London
Attendance: 23,892
Umpires: Nigel Llong and Alex Wharf
Player of the match: D'Arcy Short (Trent Rockets)

- London Spirit won the toss and elected to field.
- Points: Trent Rockets 2, London Spirit 0.

==== August ====
1 August 2021
14:30
Scorecard

Trent Rockets; 144/6 (100 balls)	v	Birmingham Phoenix; 145/4 (74 balls)
Dawid Malan 51 (41); Adam Milne 2/13 (20 balls)		Finn Allen 43 (23); Rashid Khan 3/26 (20 balls)

Birmingham Phoenix won by 6 wickets
Edgbaston, Birmingham
Attendance: 17,479
Umpires: Nigel Llong and Steve O'Shaughnessy
Player of the match: Will Smeed (Birmingham Phoenix)

- Birmingham Phoenix won the toss and elected to field.
- Points: Birmingham Phoenix 2, Trent Rockets 0.

6 August 2021
19:00 (N)
Scorecard

Welsh Fire; 139/8 (100 balls)	v	Trent Rockets; 140/4 (90 balls)
Glenn Phillips 50 (35); Wahab Riaz 4/30 (20 balls)		Samit Patel 46* (20); Qais Ahmad 2/23 (20 balls)

Trent Rockets won by 6 wickets
Sophia Gardens, Cardiff
Umpires: Rob Bailey and Martin Saggers
Player of the match: Samit Patel (Trent Rockets)

- Trent Rockets won the toss and elected to field.
- Points: Trent Rockets 2, Welsh Fire 0.

8 August 2021
19:00 (N)
Scorecard

Oval Invincibles; 125/6 (65 balls)	v	Trent Rockets; 116/8 (65 balls)
Jason Roy 56* (29); Samit Patel 2/21 (15 balls)		Lewis Gregory 28* (12); Sunil Narine 3/11 (10 balls)

Oval Invincibles won by 9 runs
The Oval, London
Attendance: 19,382
Umpires: Nick Cook and Nigel Llong
Player of the match: Jason Roy (Oval Invincibles)

- Trent Rockets won the toss and elected to field.
- The match was reduced to 65 balls per side due to rain.
- Points: Oval Invincibles 2, Trent Rockets 0.

13 August 2021
19:00 (N)
Scorecard

Birmingham Phoenix; 166/6 (100 balls)	v	Trent Rockets; 150/9 (100 balls)
Liam Livingstone 50 (31); Sam Cook 2/32 (20 balls)		Steven Mullaney 49 (33); Pat Brown 3/27 (20 balls)

Birmingham Phoenix won by 16 runs
Trent Bridge, Nottingham
Umpires: Peter Hartley and David Millns
Player of the match: Liam Livingstone (Birmingham Phoenix)

- Trent Rockets won the toss and elected to field.
- Points: Birmingham Phoenix 2, Trent Rockets 0.

15 August 2021
19:00 (N)
Scorecard

Manchester Originals; 135/8 (100 balls)	v	Trent Rockets; 136/3 (95 balls)
Colin Munro 45 (22); Rashid Khan 3/16 (20 balls)		Dawid Malan 52 (46); Matt Parkinson 2/21 (20 balls)

Trent Rockets won by 7 wickets
Trent Bridge, Nottingham
Umpires: Steve O'Shaughnessy and Russell Warren
Player of the match: Dawid Malan (Trent Rockets)

- Manchester Originals won the toss and elected to bat.
- Points: Trent Rockets 2, Manchester Originals 0.

=== Fixtures (Women) ===
==== July ====
24 July 2021
11:00
Scorecard

Southern Brave; 133/5 (100 balls)	v	Trent Rockets; 110/7 (100 balls)
Stafanie Taylor 45* (31); Nat Sciver 2/33 (20 balls)		Nat Sciver 44 (29); Anya Shrubsole 4/13 (20 balls)

Southern Brave won by 23 runs
Trent Bridge, Nottingham
Umpires: Nick Cook and Sue Redfern
Player of the match: Stafanie Taylor (Southern Brave)

- Trent Rockets won the toss and elected to field.
- Points: Southern Brave 2, Trent Rockets 0.

26 July 2021
15:00
Scorecard

Northern Superchargers; 149/7 (100 balls)	v	Trent Rockets; 122/7 (100 balls)
Jemimah Rodrigues 60 (41); Sammy-Jo Johnson 4/15 (20 balls)		Katherine Brunt 43* (36); Katie Levick 2/20 (20 balls)

Northern Superchargers won by 27 runs
Trent Bridge, Nottingham
Umpires: David Millns and Sue Redfern
Player of the match: Jemimah Rodrigues (Northern Superchargers)

- Northern Superchargers won the toss and elected to bat.
- Points: Northern Superchargers 2, Trent Rockets 0.

29 July 2021
15:00
Scorecard

Trent Rockets; 151/4 (100 balls)	v	London Spirit; 133/7 (100 balls)
Rachel Priest 76 (42); Freya Davies 1/19 (20 balls)		Heather Knight 31 (25); Lucy Higham 2/12 (15 balls)

Trent Rockets won by 18 runs
Lord's, London
Umpires: Neil Mallender and Sue Redfern
Player of the match: Rachel Priest (Trent Rockets)

- Trent Rockets won the toss and elected to bat.
- Points: Trent Rockets 2, London Spirit 0.

==== August ====
1 August 2021
11:00
Scorecard

Trent Rockets; 145/5 (100 balls)	v	Birmingham Phoenix; 134/9 (100 balls)
Heather Graham 44 (21); Kirstie Gordon 1/20 (20 balls)		Issy Wong 27 (11); Sammy-Jo Johnson 3/28 (20 balls)

Trent Rockets won by 11 runs
Edgbaston, Birmingham
Umpires: Rob Bailey and Jasmine Naeem
Player of the match: Heather Graham (Trent Rockets)

- Trent Rockets won the toss and elected to bat.
- Points: Trent Rockets 2, Birmingham Phoenix 0.

6 August 2021
15:30
Scorecard

Welsh Fire; 102 (100 balls)	v	Trent Rockets; 103/6 (92 balls)
Hayley Matthews 28 (32); Heather Graham 3/14 (20 balls)		Nat Sciver 54 (40); Hayley Matthews 2/13 (20 balls)

Trent Rockets won by 4 wickets
Sophia Gardens, Cardiff
Umpires: Peter Hartley and Jasmine Naeem
Player of the match: Nat Sciver (Trent Rockets)

- Trent Rockets won the toss and elected to field.
- Points: Trent Rockets 2, Welsh Fire 0.

8 August 2021
15:30
Scorecard

Trent Rockets	v	Oval Invincibles

No result
The Oval, London
Umpires: Rob Bailey and Sarah Bartlett

- Trent Rockets won the toss and elected to bat.
- No play was possible due to rain.
- Points: Oval Invincibles 1, Trent Rockets 1.

13 August 2021
15:30
Scorecard

Trent Rockets; 125/7 (100 balls)	v	Birmingham Phoenix; 129/7 (94 balls)
Abigail Freeborn 30 (23); Kirstie Gordon 3/26 (20 balls)		Erin Burns 38 (26); Sammy-Jo Johnson 3/22 (19 balls)

Birmingham Phoenix won by 3 wickets
Trent Bridge, Nottingham
Umpires: Rob Bailey and Jasmine Naeem
Player of the match: Erin Burns (Birmingham Phoenix)

- Birmingham Phoenix won the toss and elected to field.
- Points: Birmingham Phoenix 2, Trent Rockets 0.

== Standings ==
=== Women ===
Pos	Team	Pld	W	L	T	NR	Pts	NRR
1	Southern Brave	8	7	1	0	0	14	1.056
2	Oval Invincibles	8	4	3	0	1	9	0.015
3	Birmingham Phoenix	8	4	4	0	0	8	0.186
4	London Spirit	8	4	4	0	0	8	0.046
5	Manchester Originals	8	3	4	0	1	7	0.016
6	Northern Superchargers	8	3	4	0	1	7	−0.041
7	Trent Rockets	8	3	4	0	1	7	−0.293
8	Welsh Fire	8	2	6	0	0	4	−1.017

Source: ESPN Cricinfo, Sky Sports

advances to the Final
advances to the Eliminator

=== Men ===
Pos	Team	Pld	W	L	T	NR	Pts	NRR
1	Birmingham Phoenix	8	6	2	0	0	12	1.087
2	Southern Brave	8	5	2	0	1	11	0.034
3	Trent Rockets	8	5	3	0	0	10	0.035
4	Oval Invincibles	8	4	3	0	1	9	0.123
5	Northern Superchargers	8	3	4	0	1	7	0.510
6	Manchester Originals	8	2	4	0	2	6	−0.361
7	Welsh Fire	8	3	5	0	0	6	−0.827
8	London Spirit	8	1	6	0	1	3	−0.641

Source: ESPN Cricinfo, Sky Sports

advances to the Final
advances to the Eliminator

== Knockout stages ==
=== Men ===
==== Eliminator ====
20 August 2021
18:30 (D/N)
Scorecard

Trent Rockets; 96 (91 balls)	v	Southern Brave; 97/3 (68 balls)
Samit Patel 20 (21); Tymal Mills 3/8 (16 balls)		James Vince 45* (27); Marchant de Lange 2/16 (20 balls)

Southern Brave won by 7 wickets
The Oval, London
Umpires: David Millns and Russell Warren
Player of the match: George Garton (Southern Brave)

- Southern Brave won the toss and elected to field.
