= 2024 Trent Rockets season =

Trent Rockets
2024 season
- Coach: Jon Lewis (women); Andy Flower (men)
- Captain: Nat Sciver-Brunt (women); Lewis Gregory (men)
- Overseas player: Ashleigh Gardner; Heather Graham; Alana King; (women); Imad Wasim; Rashid Khan; Rovman Powell; (men)
- Ground(s): Trent Bridge

The 2024 season was Trent Rockets 4th season of the 100 ball franchise cricket, The Hundred.

== Players ==
- **Bold** denotes players with international caps.

=== Women's side ===
No.	Name	Nationality	Date of birth (age)	Batting style	Bowling style	Notes
Batters
—	Aylish Cranstone	England	28 August 1994 (age 31)	Left-handed	Left-arm medium	Wildcard player
—	Grace Scrivens	England	13 November 2003 (age 22)	Left-handed	Right-arm off break	
All-rounders
4	**Bryony Smith**	England	12 December 1997 (age 28)	Right-handed	Right-arm off break	
10	**Nat Sciver-Brunt**	England	20 August 1992 (age 33)	Right-handed	Right-arm medium	Captain
—	**Ashleigh Gardner**	Australia	15 April 1997 (age 28)	Right-handed	Right-arm off break	Overseas player
—	**Katie George**	England	7 April 1999 (age 26)	Right-handed	Left-arm medium	
—	**Heather Graham**	Australia	5 October 1996 (age 29)	Right-handed	Right-arm medium	Overseas player
Wicket-keepers
—	Kira Chathli	England	29 July 1999 (age 26)	Right-handed	—	
—	Nat Wraith	England	3 October 2001 (age 24)	Right-handed	—	Wildcard player
Pace bowlers
6	Cassidy McCarthy	England	23 July 2002 (age 23)	Right-handed	Right-arm medium	
9	Grace Potts	England	12 July 2002 (age 23)	Right-handed	Right-arm medium	
22	Alexa Stonehouse	England	12 May 2004 (age 21)	Right-handed	Left-arm medium	
Spin bowlers
12	**Alana King**	Australia	22 November 1995 (age 30)	Right-handed	Right-arm leg break	Overseas player
48	**Kirstie Gordon**	England	20 October 1997 (age 28)	Right-handed	Slow left-arm orthodox	
—	Josie Groves	England	5 September 2004 (age 21)	Right-handed	Right-arm leg break	

=== Men's side ===
No.	Name	Nationality	Date of birth (age)	Batting style	Bowling style	Notes
Batters
10	**Alex Hales**	England	3 January 1989 (age 36)	Right-handed	Right-arm medium	
48	**Sam Hain**	England	16 July 1995 (age 30)	Right-handed	Right-arm off break	
66	**Joe Root**	England	30 December 1990 (age 34)	Right-handed	Right-arm off break	Centrally contracted player
—	Tom Alsop	England	26 November 1995 (age 30)	Left-handed	Slow left-arm orthodox	Wildcard player
—	**Adam Lyth**	England	25 September 1987 (age 38)	Left-handed	Right-arm off break	
—	**Rovman Powell**	West Indies	23 July 1993 (age 32)	Right-handed	Right-arm medium	Overseas player
All-rounders
9	**Imad Wasim**	Pakistan	18 December 1988 (age 36)	Left-handed	Slow left-arm orthodox	Overseas player
24	**Lewis Gregory**	England	24 May 1992 (age 33)	Right-handed	Right-arm fast-medium	Captain
—	Jordan Thompson	England	9 October 1996 (age 29)	Left-handed	Right-arm fast-medium	
Wicket-keepers
—	**Tom Banton**	England	11 November 1998 (age 27)	Right-handed	—	
Pace bowlers
6	John Turner	South Africa	10 April 2001 (age 24)	Right-handed	Right-arm fast-medium	UK passport
14	**Luke Wood**	England	2 August 1995 (age 30)	Left-handed	Left-arm fast-medium	
16	Sam Cook	England	4 August 1997 (age 28)	Right-handed	Right-arm fast-medium	
—	**Ollie Robinson**	England	1 December 1993 (age 32)	Right-handed	Right-arm fast-medium	Wildcard player
Spin bowlers
19	**Rashid Khan**	Afghanistan	20 September 1998 (age 27)	Right-handed	Right-arm leg break	Overseas player
—	Calvin Harrison	England	29 April 1998 (age 27)	Right-handed	Right-arm leg break	

== Standings ==
=== Women ===
Pos	Team	Pld	W	L	T	NR	Pts	NRR	Qualification
1	Welsh Fire	8	5	2	0	1	11	0.334	Advanced to the Final
2	Oval Invincibles	8	5	2	1	0	11	0.034	Advanced to the Eliminator
3	London Spirit	8	4	3	1	0	9	0.080	Advanced to the Eliminator
4	Northern Superchargers	8	3	3	1	1	8	0.942	
5	Trent Rockets	8	4	4	0	0	8	0.407	
6	Manchester Originals	8	3	4	0	1	7	−0.398	
7	Birmingham Phoenix	8	3	4	0	1	7	−0.742	
8	Southern Brave	8	1	6	1	0	3	−0.675	

Source: ESPNcricinfo

=== Men ===
Pos	Team	Pld	W	L	T	NR	Pts	NRR	Qualification
1	Oval Invincibles	8	6	2	0	0	12	0.893	Advanced to the Final
2	Birmingham Phoenix	8	6	2	0	0	12	0.402	Advanced to the Eliminator
3	Southern Brave	8	5	2	0	1	11	0.595	Advanced to the Eliminator
4	Northern Superchargers	8	5	2	0	1	11	−0.453	
5	Trent Rockets	8	4	4	0	0	8	0.348	
6	Welsh Fire	8	2	4	0	2	6	−0.215	
7	Manchester Originals	8	1	7	0	0	2	−0.886	
8	London Spirit	8	1	7	0	0	2	−0.975	

Source: ESPN Cricinfo
