= Joe Moores =

English cricketer

Personal information
- Full name: Joseph Henry Alan Moores
- Born: 15 September 2008 (age 18); Macclesfield, Cheshire, England
- Batting: Left-handed
- Role: Wicket-keeper
- Relatives: Peter Moores (uncle); Tom Moores (cousin)

Domestic team information
- Years: Team
- 2025–: Lancashire (squad no. 24)
- 2026: London Spirit (squad no. 24)
- First-class debut: 12 June 2026 Lancashire v Kent
- List A debut: 22 July 2025; PCC XI v Pakistan Shaheens

Career statistics
Competition	FC	LA	T20
Matches	3	11	16
Runs scored	76	270	166
Batting average	12.66	33.75	16.60
100s/50s	0/1	0/2	0/1
Top score	57	85	55
Catches/stumpings	6/1	8/0	12/0
- Source: ESPNcricinfo, 12 September 2026

Joseph Henry Alan Moores (born 15 September 2008) is an English cricketer who plays for Lancashire County Cricket Club. He is a left-handed batsman and wicket-keeper.

== Career ==
From Macclesfield, Moores attended King's School and played for Macclesfield Cricket Club.

Moores made his List-A cricket debut for Lancashire as a 17 year-old in 2025. His top score in his debut summer was 35 from 21 balls against Middlesex in August. Later that year, he signed a first professional contract with Lancashire. He played for England U19 at the 2026 Under-19 Men's Cricket World Cup.

On 22 May 2026, Moores became Lancashire's youngest ever player in the T20 Blast, featuring against Surrey. On 12 June, he made his first-class debut for Lancashire against Kent. In August, having been an ever-present for Lancashire in the One Day Cup and scoring 142 runs at an average of 71, including a career best 85 against Northamptonshire, Moores was selected as an injury replacement by The Hundred franchise London Spirit. In September, Moores was included in the England Lions cricket team squad for two T20s against Sri Lanka.

== Personal life ==
His father Steve Moores captained Macclesfield and is head of cricket at King's School, Macclesfield. His uncle, Peter Moores, was a professional cricketer and later coach of England. His cousin Tom Moores is also a professional cricketer.
