= Great Baddow High School =

GBHS

Location
- Duffield Road; Chelmsford, Essex, CM2 9RZ; England; 51°42′49″N 0°29′10″E

Information
- Type: Academy
- Motto: Semper Altiora Speramus (We always strive for higher things)
- Established: 8 September 1965
- Department for Education URN: 136904 Tables
- Ofsted: Reports
- Head teacher: Paul Farmer
- Gender: Coeducational
- Age: 11 to 18
- Enrolment: 1,390
- Houses: Attenborough, Ennis-Hill, Hawkins
- Colours: Black and gold
- Team name: Eagles
- Website: www.gbhs.co.uk

Great Baddow High School is a comprehensive secondary school in Chelmsford, Essex, England. It is a sports college with academy status and with science as a second specialism. It draws its students from primary schools in the Chelmsford area.

== History ==
The school opened on 8 September 1965 as Baddow Comprehensive, with 16 staff and 227 children in First Year only. In 2002, it became one of seven Sports Colleges in Essex; in 2011 it converted to Academy status while retaining its sports specialism. In late 2014 it adopted science as a second specialism.

As commemorated in its main reception, the school has had the following headteachers since its establishment:

- 1965: James Gordon B.Sc.
- 1980: Roy Baldock B.A.
- 1991: Roger Hunton M.Sc.
- 2010: Carrie Lynch B.A. (Hons)
- 2019: Paul Farmer B.A.

== Notable people ==
- Rebecca Gallantree, diver
- Sam Cook, cricketer
- Aaron Beard, cricketer, attended Sixth Form at the school
- Graham Nelson, Mathematician, poet, game designer
