= Peter Moores (cricketer) =

English cricketer and coach

Personal information
- Full name: Peter Moores
- Born: 18 December 1962 (age 63); Macclesfield, Cheshire, England
- Nickname: Stigsy
- Height: 6 ft 0 in (1.83 m)
- Batting: Right-handed
- Role: Wicket-keeper
- Relatives: Tom Moores (son); Joe Moores (nephew)

Domestic team information
- Years: Team
- 1983–1984: Worcestershire
- 1985–1998: Sussex
- 1988–1989: Orange Free State

Head coaching information
- Years: Team
- 1998–2007: Sussex
- 2007–2009: England
- 2009–2014: Lancashire
- 2014–2015: England
- 2016–: Nottinghamshire
- 2022: Karachi Kings
- 2023-2025: Melbourne Stars

Career statistics
| Competition | FC | LA |
|---|---|---|
| Matches | 231 | 245 |
| Runs scored | 7,351 | 2,603 |
| Batting average | 24.34 | 17.70 |
| 100s/50s | 7/31 | 0/8 |
| Top score | 185 | 89* |
| Balls bowled | 18 | 0 |
| Wickets | 0 | – |
| Bowling average | – | – |
| 5 wickets in innings | – | – |
| 10 wickets in match | – | – |
| Best bowling | – | – |
| Catches/stumpings | 502/44 | 225/32 |
- Source: CricketArchive, 18 December 2009

Peter Moores (born 18 December 1962) is an English former cricketer who is currently the head coach of first-class county club Nottinghamshire and Big Bash League club Melbourne Stars.

Moores played as a wicketkeeper for Worcestershire and Sussex, the latter of whom he captained in 1997. He retired from playing first-class cricket in 1998 and became a successful coach of Sussex, leading the county to promotion from Division Two in 2001, and then to the County Championship title in both 2003 and 2006.

Moores was appointed coach of the England team in April 2007. In January 2009, Moores was removed as coach following a public falling out with Kevin Pietersen, who also left his position as England captain.

He went on to become the coach of Lancashire in February 2009, leading the side to their first Championship title in 77 years in 2011. In doing so, Moores became the only coach to have won the Championship with two different counties.

In 2014, Moores was re-appointed to coach the England national men's team, serving until shortly after the 2015 World Cup. In 2016 he was appointed head coach of Nottinghamshire.

== Playing career ==
Moores began his career at Worcestershire, where he made a name for himself as a young and talented wicket keeper. However, his opportunities were limited due to players ahead of him. He moved to Sussex in 1985, but again found his opportunities limited. Four years later, he won his county cap.

In 1997, he was made Sussex captain and became part of the coaching set-up. He retired in 1998 at the age of 36 in order to focus on his coaching career. Throughout his career, Moores scored seven first-class centuries and achieved over 800 dismissals, of which 727 were catches.

== Early coaching career ==
After retiring from playing, Moores became Sussex coach, leading the county to two Championship titles in 2003 and 2006.

Moores coached England "A" on their tour of the West Indies in 2000/01, and the English National Cricket Academy between 2005 and 2007.

== Coach of England ==
=== West Indies (2007) ===
Following the Ashes 2006/07 tour of Australia, and Cricket World Cup in the West Indies, Moores was appointed coach of the England cricket team in April 2007 after previous coach, Duncan Fletcher resigned.

The first Test was a draw after heavy rain, and in the second Test at Headingley Moores looked for his first victory.

The third test was located at Old Trafford, in which England won by 60 runs. The fourth test England won by seven wickets, meaning Moores' first series as head coach he won 3–0.

=== India (2007) ===
Moores second series in charge saw him come up against India. For the Tests, Moores called up Chris Tremlett and handed him his debut in the First Test. England came close to winning the match but fell one wicket short of a convincing victory, with India hanging on to post 282/9 on the final day after England took a big lead in to the second innings following a hundred from Kevin Pietersen. Had it not been for the rain delaying play on day five, England would have almost certainly won the match. This was seen as further improvements being heralded under the regime of Moores. The second test saw a less convincing performance from England, losing convincingly to India who held a 1–0 lead. On the third and final test, the match ended in a draw, and India clinched the series 1–0. This marked Moores first defeat as Coach of England.

=== Sri Lanka (2007) ===
The tour of Sri Lanka was Moores first tour overseas. The tour started with five ODI Internationals. England were humbled in the first match, being bowled out for 150 chasing 270 to win the game. The following match saw the tables turned as England bowled Sri Lanka for out for 169 to win the game by 65 runs and level the series 1–1. England then won the next match of the series which was badly affected by rain, resulting in the match being decided by the DL Method. The fourth ODI saw England complete a series win after winning the game by five wickets after chasing down 212 to win. Although England lost the final game by 107 runs after being bowled out for just 104, the 3–2 series win represented major progress for England, who had traditionally struggled on the sub-continent pitches. England had also gone into the series with a young team, including James Anderson, Stuart Broad and Ravi Bopara, showing that Moores was successfully bringing through a new crop of England players.

The three match test series started poorly for England, as they lost the match by 88 runs. In the second test Stuart Broad was given his debut. The game ended in a draw with England finishing on 250/3. The second match was interrupted by rain, although Sri Lanka posted 499 in their first innings. England were dismissed for just 81 in reply, putting them in danger of losing the match. However, due to the rain, England survived, finishing on 251/6. England lost the series 2–1, meaning they had now lost their previous two test series.

=== New Zealand (2008) ===
England's tour of New Zealand started with two T20 Internationals. England won the first match by 32 runs following an impressive bowling performance from Ryan Sidebottom. After posting 193 in the second T20, England won by 50 runs. This saw them win the series 2–0 and provided Moores with yet another limited over series victory, following successes against India and Sri Lanka. it also marked Moores first T20 victory, having lost his only previous match against the West Indies.

=== South Africa (2008) ===
Following the home series against New Zealand, England faced South Africa. The tour started with four Test Matches against the South Africa, with the opener being played at Lord's. England named the same starting eleven for the sixth straight test match, but we're unable to beat the tourists despite scoring over 500 in the first innings. After South Africa made 247, England enforced the follow on, only for South Africa to secure a draw untroubled, losing only three second innings wickets. The following Test saw England's first defeat in the longer format of the game in the summer, as South Africa convincingly won by 10 wickets. The third test saw England suffer another defeat, this time by 5 wickets. England trailed by 83 runs going into the final innings, and despite posting 363, South Africa won the game with five wickets in hand.

Ahead of the ODI series, Collingwood stood down as ODI captain, allowing Pietersen to take control of the team for all formats of the game. The only T20 International between South Africa and England was cancelled due to rain, and so Pietersen's reign as permanent captain began in the first ODI. England won the game by 20 runs, with Pietersen again impressing with an unbeaten 90. In the second ODI, England humiliated the tourists, bowling them out for 83 and winning the match by 10 wickets. England again cruised to victory in the third ODI, winning by 126 runs and taking an unassailable 3–0 series lead. The fourth ODI again went England's way, this time they won by 7 wickets thanks to the DL Method. Although the final game was called off, England had already won the series 4–0, the first time they had remained undefeated in an ODI series during the Moores era.

=== India (2008) ===
England headed over to India in 2008 for the final tour of the year. Optimism was high following the demolition of South Africa in the ODI series, as much was expected ahead of Kevin Pietersen's first full Test series as captain. The tour started with seven ODI's. England were heavily defeated in the first match, with India posting 387/5 in their 50 overs. England could only manage 229 and the result lead to criticism due to the manner of the defeat. England improved in the second match although they still lost by 54 runs, although this time they had restricted India to 292. England narrowly lost the third ODI, losing on the DL Method by 16 runs. England lost the fourth ODI on the DL Method again, this time by 19 runs. Both results were controversial as England looked to be in control in both games and would have probably gone on to win. However, England were now 4–0 down with just three games left to play, meaning they had lost the series. The fifth ODI, resulted in a six wicket defeat for England. After England had posted 270/4, India chased it down within 44 overs. The final two games of the series were cancelled following the 2008 Mumbai attacks.

Despite the terror attacks, the Test series still went ahead, although the games were moved in terms of location. England lost the first match by 6 wickets despite taking a lead of 75 into the second innings. England then declared on 311/9, but India chased down the total thanks to a century from Sachin Tendulkar Andrew Strauss had scored centuries in both innings for England, while Paul Collingwood also made a hundred in the second innings. The second test resulted in a draw, the first match England had not lost on the tour. India posted 453 in the first innings, while England avoided the follow on making 302. In the second innings India declared on 251/7, but England saw out the draw, ending the match on 64/1. The result meant that India won the Test series 1–0.

=== Conflict with Kevin Pietersen and sacking (2009) ===
In early 2009, following England's losses in both the Test and one-day matches in India, the media reported that English captain Kevin Pietersen had asked the England and Wales Cricket Board (ECB) to hold emergency meetings to discuss Moores' role with the team. Days later, Pietersen commented to the media publicly regarding the dispute, eliciting speculation that Moores might soon be removed as coach. Moores and Pietersen were believed to be in disagreement on several issues, including the team's training regime, and the possible selection of former England captain Michael Vaughan for play in an upcoming tour of the West Indies. On 7 January 2009, Moores was removed as coach by the ECB, and Pietersen unexpectedly resigned as captain.

In June 2009, the furore having died down, Pietersen announced that the England dressing room was a far happier place for Moores's absence: "The team wasn't happy, things weren't right, and England cricket was going nowhere, but I believe in the last six months the team has made big progress before a huge, huge series against Australia. I'm very happy, and everyone's happy."

With the tension between the two seemingly unresolved, following England's victory over Australia in the 4th Ashes Test at Melbourne which saw England retain the Ashes for the first time since the 1986–87 Ashes, Pietersen claimed that without the removal of Moores, England would not have been in a position to beat Australia, claiming the change in regime brought about a better working climate within the squad. Pietersen went on to say: "You know what – I have never said this before – I lost the captaincy, I got rid of the captaincy for the good of English cricket, and we would not be here today if I had not done what I did then."

== Lancashire coach ==
Following his dismissal as England coach, Moores accepted a job offer from Lancashire. He guided Lancashire to County Championship glory in 2011, the first time they had won the title outright since 1934. The title represented Moores third County Championship success. He also took Lancashire to the finals Day of the Twenty20 competition, although they lost at the semi-final stage. 2012 represented a disappointing season for Lancashire, in which they were relegated into County Championship Division 2. However, the following season they were promoted after winning the second tier of the Championship, meaning Moores had achieved promotion with Sussex and Lancashire.

== Return as England coach ==
After success as Lancashire coach, he was confirmed as the replacement of Andy Flower as head coach of England on 19 April 2014. Moores won his first game, an ODI against Scotland.

=== World Cup (2015) ===
England's World Cup campaign got off to a poor start as they suffered a 111 runs defeat at the hands of Australia. They suffered another humiliating defeat in their next match as lost to New Zealand by eight wickets. England relieved the pressure on them by securing a comfortable win against Scotland, but another heavy defeat, this time nine wickets against Sri Lanka, meant that England had to win their final two games to qualify. Defeat against Bangladesh ended any hopes of qualification, which led to suggestions that Moores could be replaced as England coach. However, he was backed by Paul Downton to rebuild the side, with Moores himself saying he was committed to the job. England won their final match against Afghanistan by nine wickets.

=== West Indies (2015) ===
Moores remained in charge of England for their tour of West Indies despite the resignation of the man who appointed him, Paul Downton. In the first match of the series, England got off to a good start, posting 399 in the first innings and then bowling the West Indies out for 295. However, they were unable to force a result and the match ended in a draw, with the West Indies saving the match. England won the second match of the series following a good batting display in the first innings. They bowled the West Indies out for 307 in the second innings, and then won the game by nine wickets thanks to contributions from Alistair Cook and Gary Ballance. Despite this, England lost the final match of the series after setting the West Indies a small target to chase in their second innings after an England batting collapse. The West Indies won the match by five wickets to draw the series 1–1.

Moores was removed from the England coaching post in 2015, after an ODI against Ireland.

== Post England ==
In September 2016, after working as a coaching consultant with the county for a year, Moores was appointed as head coach of Nottinghamshire. Under his leadership, the Outlaws won the T20 Blast in 2017 and 2020, as well as the 2017 One-Day Cup. In 2025, he led Nottinghamshire to the County Championship title, becoming the first coach to win the competition with three different teams.

In December 2021, he was appointed as Karachi Kings head coach for PSL 7, and in March 2023, he was named as head coach of Big Bash League side Melbourne Stars on a two-year contract.

== Other cricket work ==
On 18 January 2008 David Graveney was removed as the head national selector. Geoff Miller took the position over, heading up a four-man panel which included Moores, James Whitaker and Ashley Giles. Moores is a member of Marylebone Cricket Club.

Sporting positions
| Preceded by Alan Wells | Sussex County Captain; 1997 | Succeeded by Chris Adams |
| Preceded by Desmond Haynes | Sussex County Coach; 1998–2005 | Succeeded by Mark Robinson |
| Preceded by Rod Marsh | ECB Cricket Academy Coach; 2005–2007 | Succeeded by David Parsons |
| Preceded by Duncan Fletcher | England National Coach; 2007–2009 | Succeeded by Andy Flower |
| Preceded by Mike Watkinson | Lancashire County Coach; 2009–2014 | Succeeded by Ashley Giles |
| Preceded by Andy Flower | England National Coach; 2014–2015 | Succeeded by Trevor Bayliss |
