= Emma Jones (cricketer) =

English cricketer (born 2002)

Personal information
- Full name: Emma Wing Sum Jones
- Born: 8 August 2002 (age 24); Hatfield, Hertfordshire, England
- Batting: Right-handed
- Bowling: Right-arm medium
- Role: All-rounder

Domestic team information
- Years: Team
- 2017: Hertfordshire
- 2019–2024: Essex
- 2021–2024: South East Stars
- 2021: Oval Invincibles
- 2023: Trent Rockets
- 2024: Birmingham Phoenix
- 2025–present: Surrey
- 2025: → Glamorgan (on loan)

Career statistics
Competition	WLA	WT20
Matches	10	28
Runs scored	124	244
Batting average	13.77	22.18
100s/50s	0/0	0/0
Top score	47	46*
Balls bowled	168	270
Wickets	2	11
Bowling average	82.00	34.27
5 wickets in innings	0	0
10 wickets in match	0	0
Best bowling	1/13	2/13
Catches/stumpings	5/–	9/–
- Source: CricketArchive, 18 October 2024

Emma Wing Sum Jones (born 8 August 2002) is an English cricketer who currently plays for Surrey. An all-rounder, she is a right-arm medium bowler and right-handed batter.

== Early life ==
Jones was born on 8 August 2002 in Hatfield, Hertfordshire.

== Domestic career ==
Jones made her county debut in 2017, for Hertfordshire against the Netherlands, in which she scored 17 runs and bowled six overs. She was later part of the age-group county setups at Hertfordshire and Essex, Jones played her first match for the senior Essex team against the United States in 2019. She appeared in four matches in Essex's Women's London Championship campaign in 2020. She played every match for Essex in the 2021 Women's Twenty20 Cup, scoring 36 runs and taking 3 wickets. She played three matches in the 2022 Women's Twenty20 Cup, scoring 14 runs and taking two wickets.

In 2021, Jones was named as part of the South East Stars squad for their upcoming season. She made her debut for the side in the opening match of the Charlotte Edwards Cup, against Lightning. She went on to play every match as her side went on to win the competition, and hit her Twenty20 high score of 46* from 27 balls in a match against Central Sparks. She also played three matches in the Rachael Heyhoe Flint Trophy, scoring 33 runs and taking 1 wicket. Oval Invincibles also signed Jones during The Hundred season, but did not play a match for the side. She played six matches for South East Stars in the 2022 Charlotte Edwards Cup, scoring 52 runs and taking two wickets. She was again signed by the Oval Invincibles for the 2022 season of The Hundred, but was later forced to withdraw due to injury. At the end of the 2022 season, it was announced that Jones had signed her first professional contract with South East Stars. She played one match for South East Stars in 2023, in the Rachael Heyhoe Flint Trophy. She was signed by Trent Rockets for The Hundred, but was ruled out due to injury. In 2024, she played 11 matches for South East Stars, across the Rachael Heyhoe Flint Trophy and the Charlotte Edwards Cup.
