= Alexa Stonehouse =

English cricketer (born 2004)

Personal information
- Full name: Alexa Kate Stonehouse
- Born: 5 December 2004 (age 21); Ashford, Kent, England
- Batting: Right-handed
- Bowling: Left-arm medium
- Role: All-rounder

Domestic team information
- Years: Team
- 2021–2024: Kent
- 2021–2024: South East Stars
- 2022–present: Trent Rockets
- 2024–present: Surrey

Career statistics
Competition	WLA	WT20
Matches	42	67
Runs scored	501	103
Batting average	16.16	14.71
100s/50s	0/1	0/0
Top score	51	22*
Balls bowled	1,427	911
Wickets	46	42
Bowling average	25.71	25.69
5 wickets in innings	0	0
10 wickets in match	0	0
Best bowling	4/27	4/28
Catches/stumpings	1/–	22/–
- Source: CricketArchive, 25 October 2025

Alexa Kate Stonehouse (born 5 December 2004) is an English cricketer who currently plays for Surrey and Trent Rockets. She plays as a right-handed batter and left-arm medium bowler.

== Early life ==
Stonehouse was born on 5 December 2004 in Ashford, Kent.

== Domestic career ==
Stonehouse made her county debut in 2021, for Kent against Middlesex in the 2021 Women's Twenty20 Cup. She played four matches that season as her side won the South East Group of the competition. She took four wickets for Kent in the 2022 Women's Twenty20 Cup, including best bowling figures of 3/27.

In 2021, Stonehouse was named in the South East Stars academy squad. Later that year, in June, it was announced that Stonehouse had signed a contract with the senior team, and made her debut for the side a day later, in the opening match of the Charlotte Edwards Cup, against Lightning. She went on to play five matches in the tournament, taking two wickets, as the South East Stars emerged victorious. She played 13 matches for South East Stars in 2022, across the Charlotte Edwards Cup and the Rachael Heyhoe Flint Trophy, taking seven wickets. She was also in the Trent Rockets squad for The Hundred, but did not play a match. She also played for England A against South Africa in June 2022. At the end of the 2022 season, it was announced that Stonehouse had signed her first professional contract with South East Stars.

In 2023, she played 14 matches for South East Stars, across the Rachael Heyhoe Flint Trophy and the Charlotte Edwards Cup, taking nine wickets and scoring one half-century. She also played seven matches for Trent Rockets in The Hundred, taking 4 wickets. In 2024, she played 17 matches for South East Stars, across the Rachael Heyhoe Flint Trophy and the Charlotte Edwards Cup, taking 22 wickets with a best bowling of 4/27.

== International career ==
In October 2022, Stonehouse was selected in the England Under-19 squad for the 2023 ICC Under-19 Women's T20 World Cup. She took six wickets in her five matches at the tournament, at an average of 11.33. In March 2024, Stonehouse was again named in the Under-19 squad for their tri-series against Sri Lanka and Australia She played five matches in the series, taking five wickets.
