= Steven Mullaney =

English cricketer (born 1986)

Personal information
- Full name: Steven John Mullaney
- Born: 19 November 1986 (age 39); Warrington, Cheshire, England
- Height: 5 ft 10 in (1.78 m)
- Batting: Right-handed
- Bowling: Right-arm medium-fast

Domestic team information
- Years: Team
- 2006–2009: Lancashire
- 2010–2024: Nottinghamshire
- 2021: Trent Rockets

Career statistics
Competition	FC	LA	T20
Matches	183	123	186
Runs scored	9,862	2,611	1,802
Batting average	33.77	35.28	17.16
100s/50s	19/50	2/19	0/3
Top score	192	124	79
Balls bowled	10,469	3,981	2,865
Wickets	144	100	133
Bowling average	36.72	34.58	28.18
5 wickets in innings	1	0	0
10 wickets in match	0	0	0
Best bowling	5/32	4/29	4/19
Catches/stumpings	172/–	57/–	96/–
- Source: ESPNcricinfo, 30 September 2023

Steven John Mullaney (born 19 November 1986) is an English retired cricketer best known for his time playing for, and captaining, Nottinghamshire. During his 18-year career he also played for Lancashire and Trent Rockets along with representing England at the 2006 Under-19 Cricket World Cup.

== Early career and youth internationals ==
Born in Warrington, Cheshire, Mullaney joined Lancashire in 2003. Along with Karl Brown, Steven Croft, and Tom Smith he was part of the first intake of Lancashire's cricket academy.

Between 2005 and 2006, Mullaney played two Youth Test matches. He debuted on 2 February 2005; playing for England U-19s for India U-19s, Mullaney bowled 8 overs for 42 runs in the match and scored 29 not out (29*) and 14, batting at number six in the first innings and number five in the second. England lost the match by an innings and 137 runs. His second and final Test was in July 2006 and also against India U-19s. He scored 0 and 31, both times batting at seven, and conceded 43 runs from 11 overs. He finished the tournament as England's leading wicket-taker, from 5 matches he took 9 wickets at an average of 15.11.

Also between 2005 and 2006, Mullaney played 15 Youth One Day Internationals. In that time, he scored 169 runs at an average of 16.90, with a highest score of 40, and took 10 wickets at an average of 29.40 and best bowling figures of 3 wickets for 26 runs (3/26). During his time in the team, Mullaney took part in the 2006 U-19 World Cup. He had been dropped from the squad after a tour of Sri Lanka in December 2005, but was selected to play in the World Cup in February 2006 after England had a winless tour of Bangladesh.

== Lancashire ==
Mullaney's statistics for Lancashire
	Matches	Runs	Batting average	Wickets	Bowling average
First-class	4	257	64.25	1	84.00
LA	8	36	12.00	10	15.80
T20	3	5	5.00	1	21.00

Mullaney made his first-class, list A, and Twenty20 debuts for Lancashire in 2006. His first team cricket with Lancashire in 2006–2009 was limited, and in that time he played 4 first-class matches, 7 list A matches, and three Twenty20 matches. In April 2007, Mullaney scored his maiden first-class century. Playing against Durham University, his innings of 165 not out (165*) came at quicker than a run a ball and allowed Lancashire to win the match. His first hundred runs came off 92 balls and the next 65 from 26 and included 10 sixes. It beat his previous highest score of 44. In the 2007 cricket season, Mullaney played for Northern Cricket Club, in the Liverpool and District Cricket Competition, averaging 70 with the bat and taking over 30 wickets. After he spent the winter of 2007/08 playing grade cricket for McKinnon in the Victorian Turf Cricket Association, Mullaney signed a professional contract with Atherton Cricket Club in the Bolton Association at the start of the 2008 season. Speaking of his move from Northern to Atherton, Mullaney said "Northern was the turning point in my career, and I have left on really good terms to try and better myself. The league [Atherton play in] will not be quite as good, and the wickets aren't quite as good, but it will be a new challenge" and that "I think getting into the pro-ing side of things is an added pressure – but it is a pressure I am really looking forward to". He set his sights on establishing himself in Lancashire's second team in the 2008 season and then force his way into the first team.

In 2009, Mullaney was a regular in the top order of the Lancashire second team which progressed to the final of the Second XI Championship and the semi-final of the Second XI Trophy.

== Nottinghamshire ==
At the end of the 2009 season he turned down a two-year contract with Lancashire and signed for Nottinghamshire.

Mullaney won the Nottinghamshire player of the year award in 2013 having moved up to the opening slot in the county championship, scoring two centuries. He also made an average contribution with the ball, in the side's YB40 title-winning side and the t20 team's progression to the quarterfinals.

He was appointed club captain on 14 November 2017, replacing the long-serving Chris Read.

== Franchise cricket ==
In April 2022, he was bought by the Trent Rockets for the 2022 season of The Hundred.

== Retirement and move into coaching ==
Having spent his final season as a player-coach and captaining Nottinghamshire's second XI, Mullaney retired from professional cricket in October 2024, moving into a purely coaching role at the club.
