= Tom Moores =

English cricketer (born 1996)

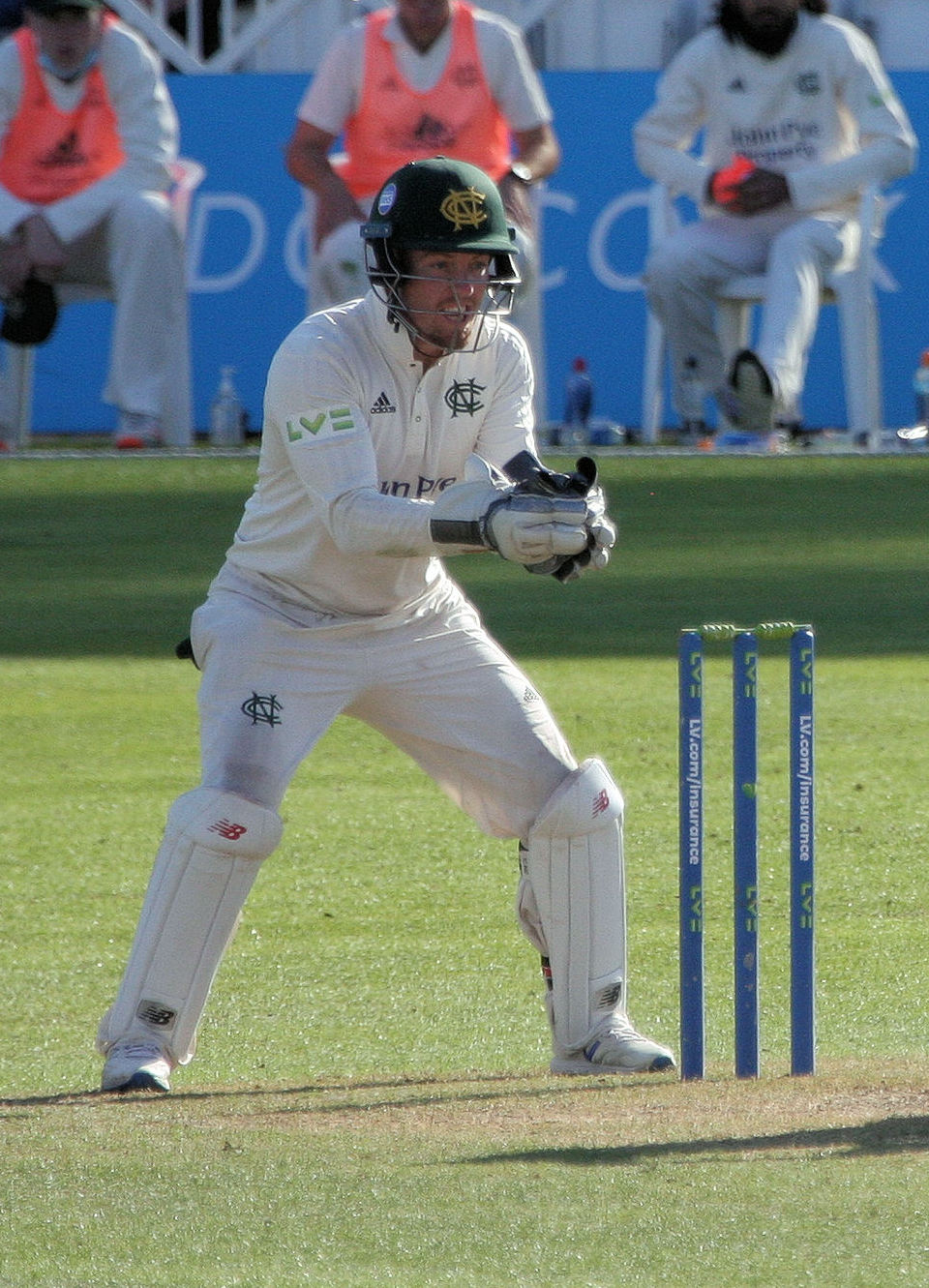
- Moores in 2021

Personal information
- Full name: Thomas James Moores
- Born: 4 September 1996 (age 30); Brighton, East Sussex, England
- Batting: Left-handed
- Role: Wicket-keeper
- Relatives: Peter Moores (father); Joe Moores (cousin)

Domestic team information
- Years: Team
- 2014–present: Nottinghamshire (squad no. 23)
- 2016: → Lancashire (on loan)
- 2020: Jaffna Stallions
- 2021: Kandy Warriors
- 2021–2023: Trent Rockets
- 2023: Sylhet Strikers
- 2024: Rangpur Riders
- 2024: Lumbini Lions
- 2025: Trent Rockets
- 2025/26: Gulf Giants
- 2026: MI Cape Town
- 2026: Manchester Super Giants
- First-class debut: 16 July 2016 Lancashire v Durham
- List A debut: 26 July 2016 Lancashire v Leicestershire

Career statistics
Competition	FC	LA	T20
Matches	78	33	195
Runs scored	2,681	951	3,299
Batting average	23.31	39.62	24.99
100s/50s	2/8	1/5	0/15
Top score	106	148	80*
Catches/stumpings	219/5	34/6	100/27
- Source: CricInfo, 17 August 2026

Thomas James Moores (born 4 September 1996) is an English cricketer who plays for Nottinghamshire. He is a left-handed batsman who also plays as a wicket-keeper.

== Domestic and franchise career ==
On 21 June 2016, Moores joined Lancashire on loan from Nottinghamshire, after regular wicket-keepers Jos Buttler and Alex Davies were unavailable. He made his Twenty20 debut for Lancashire, on 24 June 2016, against Worcestershire. He was signed by Multan Sultans for the Pakistan Super League 2018/19 season. He had a disappointing spell in the PSL, scoring just 10 runs in 3 matches. He played for Jaffna Stallions in the 2020/21 Lanka Premier League. He had a frustrated spell and played 5 matches in the Lanka Premier League, scoring 61 runs in total.

In December 2021, he was signed by Kandy Warriors to replace Devon Thomas for the remainder of the 2021 campaign.

He was drafted by Trent Rockets for the inaugural season of The Hundred. In April 2022, he was bought by the Trent Rockets for the 2022 season of The Hundred.

Moore's signed a one-year contract extension in March 2024 tying him in to Nottinghamshire until the end of the 2025 season.

In December 2024, Moores signed a new two-year white-ball only contract with Nottinghamshire.

== Personal life ==
Tom is the son of former England Head Coach Peter Moores.
