= Marchant de Lange =

South African cricketer

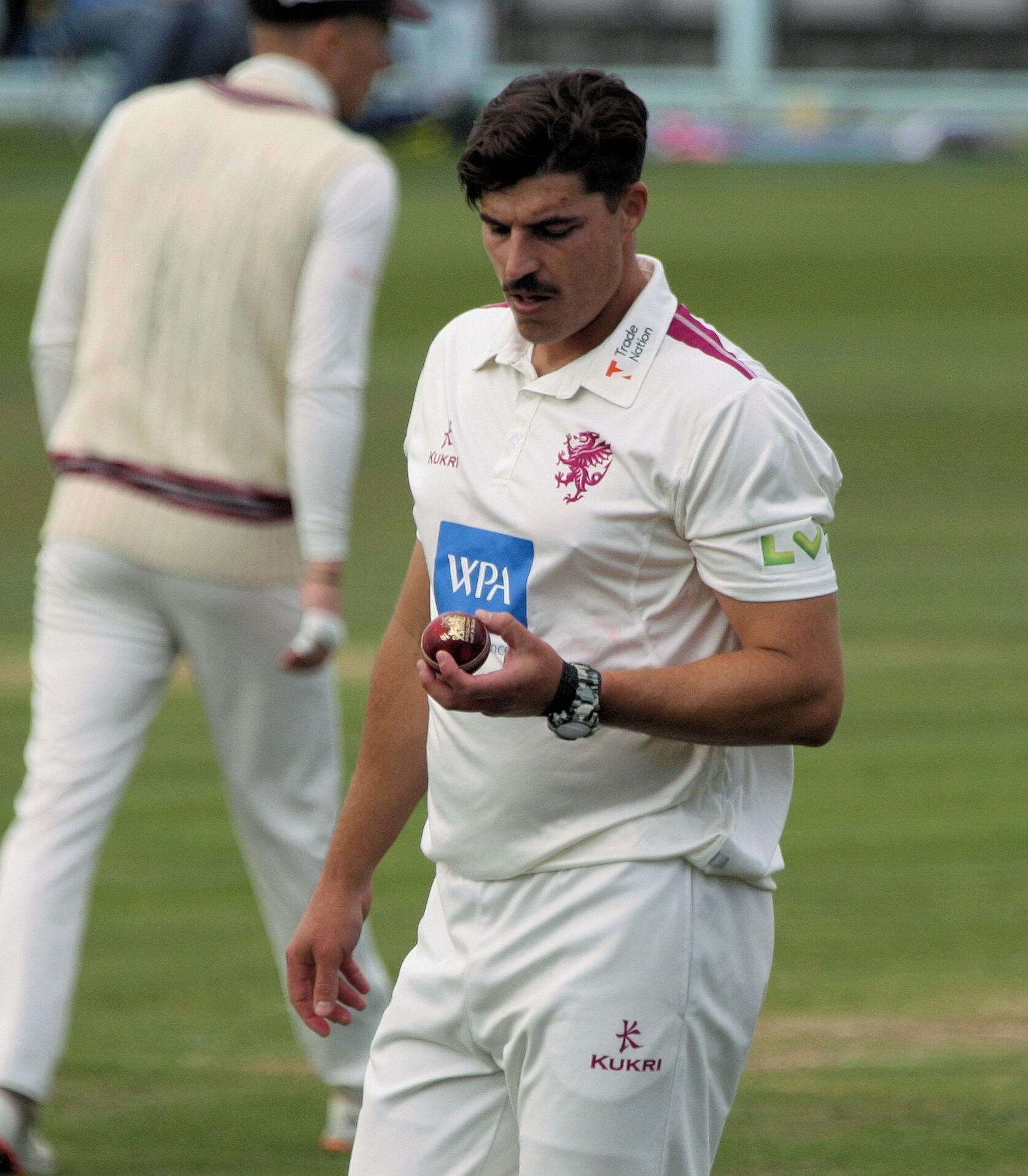
- de Lange playing for Somerset in 2021

Personal information
- Full name: Marchant de Lange
- Born: 13 October 1990 (age 36); Tzaneen, Transvaal Province, South Africa
- Nickname: Langy, Chant, Chana
- Height: 2.01 m (6 ft 7 in)
- Batting: Right-handed
- Bowling: Right-arm fast
- Role: Bowler

International information
- National side: South Africa (2011–2016)
- Test debut (cap 312): 26 December 2011 v Sri Lanka
- Last Test: 23 March 2012 v New Zealand
- ODI debut (cap 103): 3 March 2012 v New Zealand
- Last ODI: 3 February 2016 v England

Domestic team information
- Years: Team
- 2010/11–2015/16: Easterns
- 2010/11–2015/16: Titans
- 2012: Kolkata Knight Riders
- 2014–2015: Mumbai Indians
- 2015: Guyana Amazon Warriors
- 2016: Barbados Tridents
- 2016/17–2018/19: Knights
- 2016/17: Free State
- 2017–2020: Glamorgan
- 2018: Durban Heat
- 2021–2022: Somerset
- 2021: Trent Rockets
- 2021: Dambulla Giants
- 2022: Islamabad United
- 2023–2026: Gloucestershire
- 2024: Abu Dhabi Knight Riders
- 2025: Biratnagar Kings

Career statistics
Competition	Test	ODI	FC	LA
Matches	2	4	112	100
Runs scored	9	–	2,162	776
Batting average	4.50	–	17.02	15.52
100s/50s	0/0	–	1/6	0/2
Top score	9	–	113	58*
Balls bowled	448	209	19,555	4,984
Wickets	9	10	380	174
Bowling average	30.78	19.80	30.48	25.91
5 wickets in innings	1	0	13	4
10 wickets in match	0	0	2	0
Best bowling	7/81	4/46	7/23	5/49
Catches/stumpings	1/–	0/–	45/–	25/–
- Source: ESPNcricinfo, 11 August 2026

Marchant de Lange (born 13 October 1990) is a South African cricketer who plays for Gloucestershire County Cricket Club.

He is a right-arm fast bowler and tail-end right-handed batsman and was called up to the South Africa squad from relative obscurity and little first-class experience for the series against Sri Lanka in 2011, returning figures of 8/126 on Test debut, including 7/81 in the Sri Lankan first innings.

He is qualified to play in English county cricket due to his British spouse.

== Playing style ==
de Lange is a tall right-arm fast bowler with an ability to gain swing and accuracy. Prior to his cricketing career, de Lange was a javelin thrower hence his ability to attain such impressive pace around 145–150 km/h from a short run-up.

== International career ==
de Lange, at the age of 19, made his first class debut in 2010 for Easterns against Free State and returned match figures of 4/99. He was called up to the South Africa squad from relative obscurity and little first-class experience for the series against Sri Lanka and impressed in the second test with pace and bounce claiming 7–81 in the Sri Lankan first-innings and capturing 1–56 in the second. He suffered an injury during an unofficial T20 series in Zimbabwe in early 2012 and was forced to remodel his action to prevent further recurrences of the injury happening again.

He made his Twenty20 debut against New Zealand on 19 February 2012 at Hamilton. He took the wicket of Martin Guptill on his debut.

== T20 franchise cricket ==
Marchant de Lange was a surprise buy in the 2012 Indian Premier League Auction with Kolkata Knight Riders notching him up for his base price of $50,000. That season he played in three matches and picked up 3 wickets at an average of 35.66.

In players auction for IPL 2014, Mumbai Indians bought this talented bowler for Rs. 30 lakhs. He debuted for them in their second match against Delhi Daredevils replacing their best bowler Lasith Malinga. It was an important match as Mumbai needed to win all their in order to qualify for the playoffs. He went for 10 in his first over but impressed everyone with a great comeback, bowling Dinesh Karthik out in the first ball he bowled to him and later getting the important wicket of Manoj Tiwary. He finished with figures of 2/31 and was awarded the "Kanna Keep Calm" award for maintaining composure and helping turn the match in his team's favour.

In October 2018, he was named in Durban Heat's squad for the first edition of the Mzansi Super League T20 tournament.

In 2021, he took the first 5 Wicket Haul in the inaugural edition of The Hundred while playing for the Trent Rockets. He finished the season as a joint leading taker with 12 wickets in total. In December 2021, he was signed by Islamabad United following the players' draft for the 2022 Pakistan Super League. In April 2022, he was bought by the Trent Rockets for the 2022 season of The Hundred.

== See also ==
- List of South Africa cricketers who have taken five-wicket hauls on Test debut
