= Sam Cook (cricketer, born 1997) =

English cricketer (born 1997)

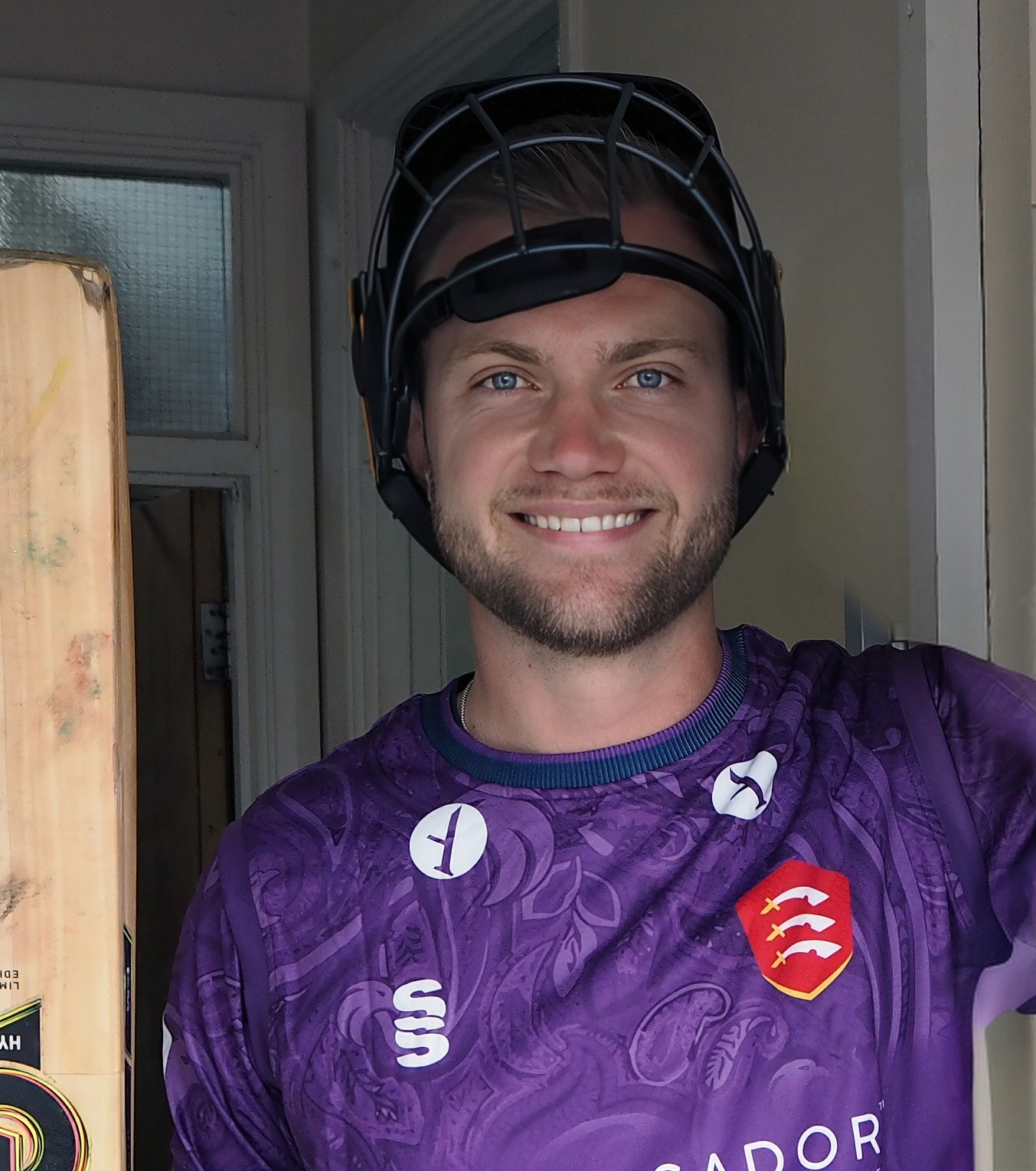
- Cook in 2024

Personal information
- Full name: Samuel James Cook
- Born: 4 August 1997 (age 29); Chelmsford, Essex, England
- Batting: Right-handed
- Bowling: Right-arm medium-fast
- Role: Bowler

International information
- National side: England (2025–present)
- Only Test (cap 719): 22 May 2025 v Zimbabwe

Domestic team information
- Years: Team
- 2016–2017: Loughborough MCCU
- 2017–present: Essex (squad no. 16)
- 2021–2025: Trent Rockets
- 2023/24: Joburg Super Kings
- 2026: Welsh Fire

Career statistics
Competition	Test	FC	LA	T20
Matches	1	105	15	112
Runs scored	–	887	17	70
Batting average	–	10.07	5.66	7.00
100s/50s	–/–	0/0	0/0	0/0
Top score	–	49	6	18
Balls bowled	186	17,025	750	2,141
Wickets	1	370	17	118
Bowling average	119.00	20.65	35.23	26.52
5 wickets in innings	0	15	0	0
10 wickets in match	0	4	0	0
Best bowling	1/72	7/23	3/37	4/15
Catches/stumpings	0/–	25/–	1/–	32/–
- Source: Cricinfo, 27 September 2026

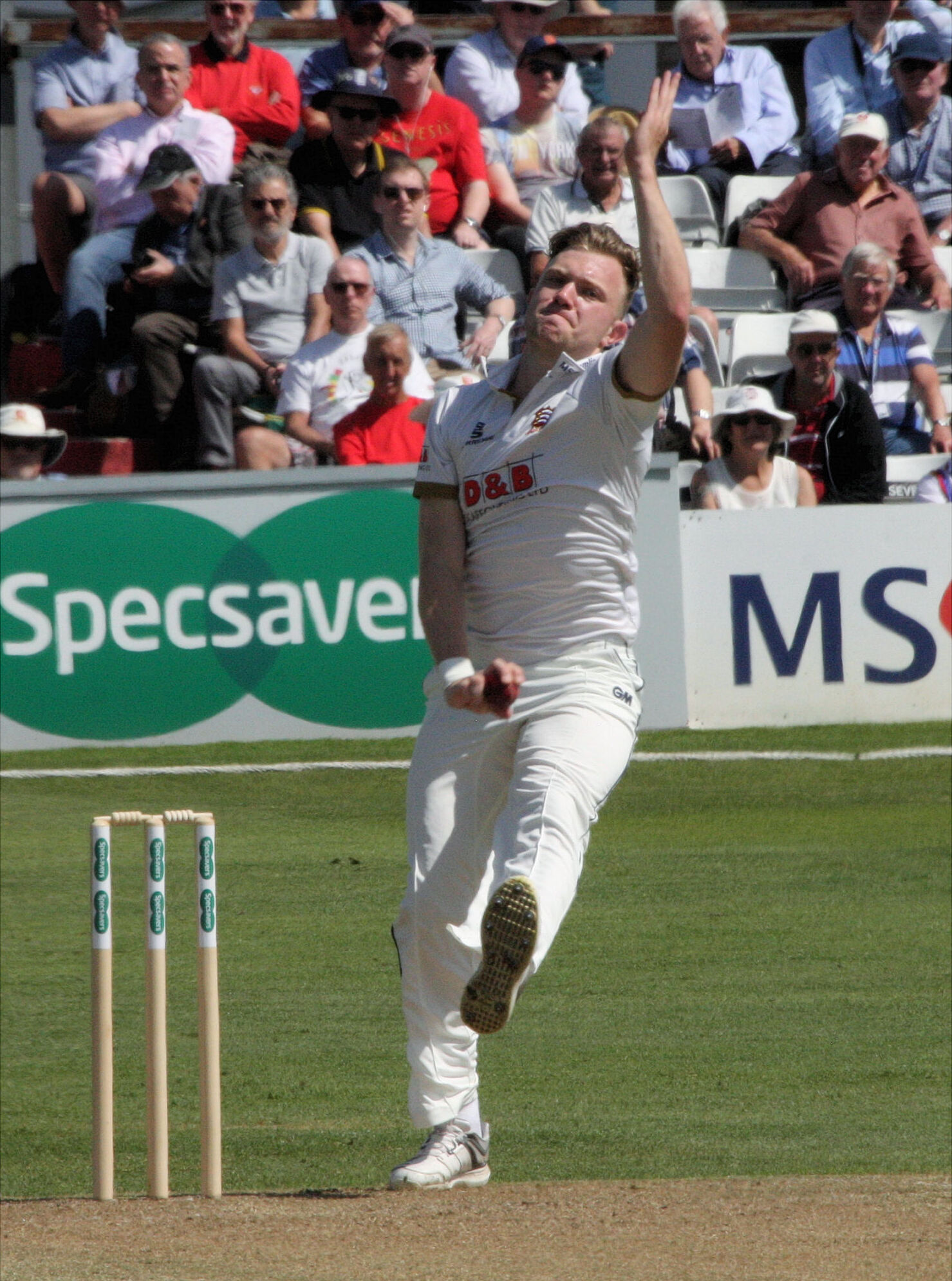
Cook bowling in 2018

Samuel James Cook (born 4 August 1997) is an English cricketer. He made his first-class debut on 31 March 2016 for Loughborough MCCU against Surrey as part of the Marylebone Cricket Club University fixtures. He played for Essex against the West Indies during their tour of England in August 2017. He was part of the 2017 County Championship winning Essex squad.

He made his List A debut for Essex in the 2018 Royal London One-Day Cup on 17 May 2018. He made his Twenty20 debut for Essex in the 2018 T20 Blast on 4 July 2018. In September 2020, in the final of the 2020 Bob Willis Trophy, Cook took a five-wicket haul. In April 2022, he was bought by the Trent Rockets for the 2022 season of The Hundred.

Cook played for England Lions against Australia in January 2025, and named in the senior squad for the Test match against Zimbabwe in May 2025.

== Personal life ==
He grew up in Chelmsford, Essex and attended Barnes Farm Junior School, Great Baddow High School and Loughborough University. Cook is a supporter of Manchester United F.C.
