= Trent Rockets =

100-ball cricket side in Nottingham, England

Personnel
- Captain: Ashleigh Gardner (women); Sam Billings (men)
- Coach: Chris Read (women); Peter Moores (men)
- Overseas players: Samantha Bates; Ashleigh Gardner; Kim Garth; Beth Mooney; (women); Finn Allen; Tim David; Matt Henry; Mitchell Santner; (men)
- Owner: Nottinghamshire Cricket Club 51%, Cain & Ares 49%

Team information
- Colours
- Founded: 2019; 7 years ago
- Home ground: Trent Bridge
- Capacity: 17,500

History
- No. of titles: 2
- Men's title wins: 1 (2022)
- Women's title wins: 1 (2026)
- Official website: Trent Rockets
The Hundred

Trent Rockets are a franchise 100-ball cricket side based in the city of Nottingham. The team represents Nottinghamshire, Derbyshire and Leicestershire in The Hundred competition, which took place for the first time in the 2021 English and Welsh cricket season. Both the men's and women's sides play at Trent Bridge.

== History ==
While early reports described the Hundred as "city-based", by March 2019 it was being reported that the Trent Bridge-based franchise would feature the locator "Trent", and this was confirmed in May when the England and Wales Cricket Board applied to trademark the name.

Nottinghamshire, Derbyshire and Leicestershire had no centrally contracted players, so the Rockets signed Yorkshire's Joe Root as their England red-ball player, and Nottinghamshire's Harry Gurney and Alex Hales as "Local Icons".

In February 2021 the side announced that former Zimbabwe cricketer Andy Flower would be the men's team's first coach, while former Yorkshire women's player Salliann Briggs was appointed coach of the Women's team.

The inaugural Hundred draft took place in October 2019 and saw the Rockets claim Joe Root as their headline men's draftee, and Natalie Sciver as the women's headliner. They are joined by England internationals Alex Hales and Dawid Malan for the men's team, while Katherine Brunt joins Sciver in the women's side.

As part of the 2025 Hundred sale, the ECB granted Nottinghamshire County Cricket Club a 51% stake in the franchise, with the remaining 49% sold through an auction process. Cain & Ares acquired the 49% share, while Nottinghamshire County Cricket Club retained its stake. The sale of the Rockets was completed in October 2025.

The Trent Rockets had a notable 2026 season, with both the men's and women's sides topping their respective tables and automatically qualifying for the final. This guaranteed them the 2026 Hundred Helix trophy, awarded to the Hundred franchise with the best combined performance by their men's and women's sides. The women's side beat the Sunrisers Leeds by eight wickets to win their first ever title. The men's side lost to the Manchester Super Giants in their final by five wickets.

== Honours ==
=== Men's honours ===
The Hundred

- Winners: 2022
- Runners Up: 2025, 2026
- Third place: 2021

=== Women's honours ===
The Hundred

- Winners: 2026
- Third place: 2022

=== Combined ===
The Hundred Helix

- Winners: 2026

== Ground ==
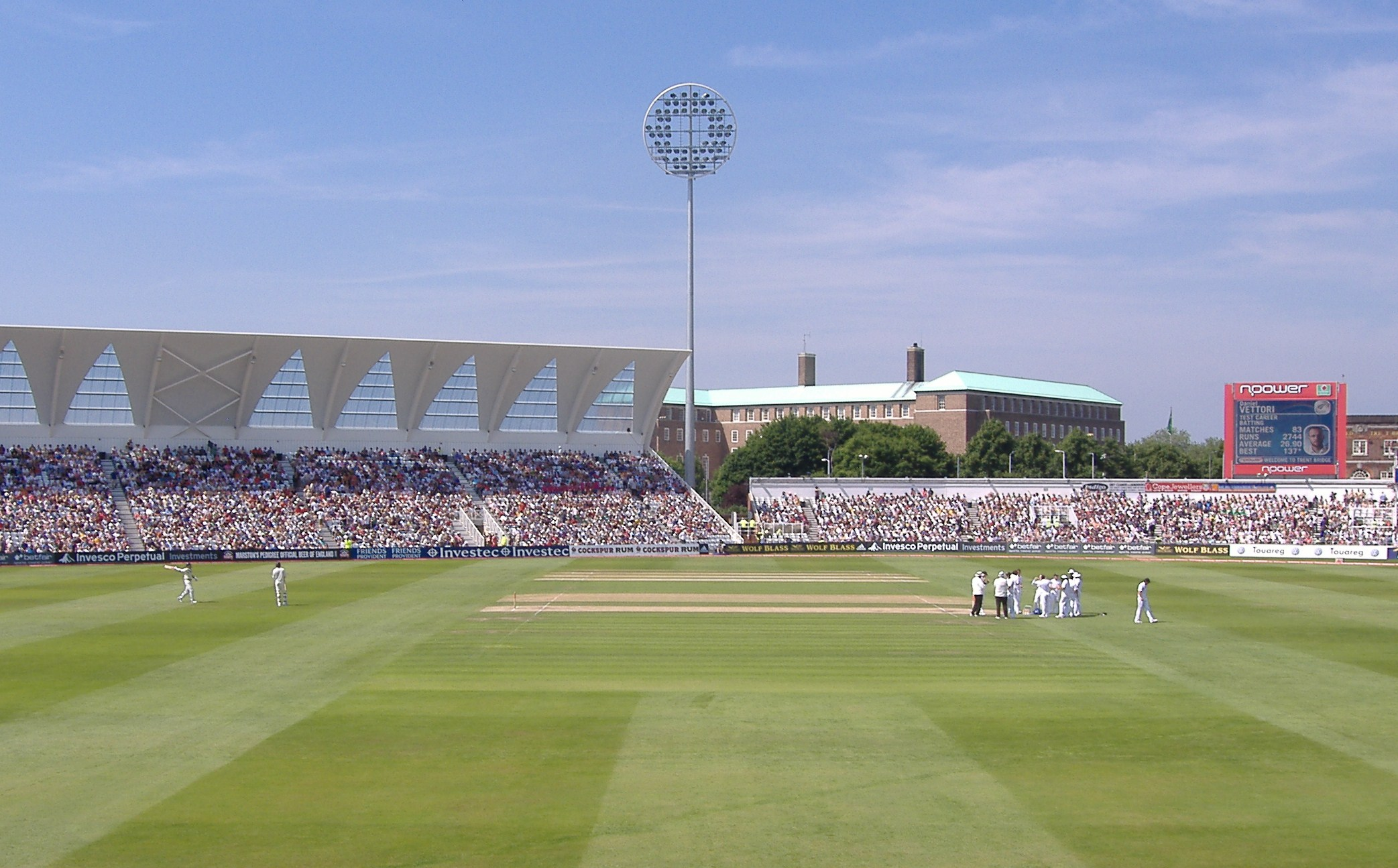
Trent Bridge

Both the Trent Rockets men's and women's sides play at the home of Nottinghamshire, Trent Bridge, in West Bridgford, Nottinghamshire. The women's side had been due to play at the home of Derbyshire County Cricket Club, the County Ground in Derby, and the home of Leicestershire, Grace Road but both teams were brought together at the same ground as a result of the COVID-19 pandemic.

== Current squads ==
- **Bold** denotes players with international caps.
- * denotes a player who is unavailable for rest of the season.

=== Women's side ===
No.	Name	Nationality	Date of birth (age)	Batting style	Bowling style	Notes
Batters
6	Sophie Luff	England	6 December 1993 (age 32)	Right-handed	Right-arm medium	Replacement player
47	**Sophia Dunkley**	England	16 July 1998 (age 28)	Right-handed	Right-arm leg break	England central contract
59	**Georgia Elwiss**	England	31 May 1991 (age 35)	Right-handed	Right-arm medium	
—	Eve Jones	England	8 August 1992 (age 34)	Left-handed	Left-arm medium	Wildcard player
—	**Ailsa Lister**	Scotland	8 April 2004 (age 22)	Right-handed	—	Ruled out through injury
All-rounders
1	**Georgia Adams**	England	4 October 1993 (age 32)	Right-handed	Right-arm off break	
34	**Kim Garth**	Australia (Note: Garth has also played international cricket for Ireland.)	25 April 1996 (age 30)	Right-handed	Right-arm medium	Overseas player
39	**Nat Sciver-Brunt**	England	20 August 1992 (age 34)	Right-handed	Right-arm medium	England central contract
63	**Ashleigh Gardner**	Australia	15 April 1997 (age 29)	Right-handed	Right-arm off break	Captain; Overseas player
88	Emma Jones	England	8 August 2002 (age 24)	Right-handed	Right-arm medium	
—	Amu Surenkumar	England	24 October 2006 (age 19)	Right-handed	Right-arm medium	Wildcard player
Wicket-keepers
23	**Beth Mooney**	Australia	14 January 1994 (age 32)	Left-handed	—	Overseas player
25	**Bess Heath**	England	20 August 2001 (age 25)	Right-handed	—	
Pace bowlers
19	Charley Phillips	England	7 May 2003 (age 23)	Right-handed	Right-arm medium	
—	Grace Johnson	England	21 December 2004 (age 21)	Right-handed	Right-arm medium	Ruled out through injury
—	Sophie Munro	England	31 August 2001 (age 25)	Right-handed	Right-arm medium	Replacement player
Spin bowlers
4	Katie Levick	England	18 July 1991 (age 35)	Right-handed	Right-arm leg break	
50	Samantha Bates	Australia	17 August 1992 (age 34)	Right-handed	Slow left-arm orthodox	Overseas player
—	Millie Taylor	England	7 October 2004 (age 21)	Right-handed	Slow left-arm unorthodox	

=== Men's side ===
No.	Name	Nationality	Date of birth (age)	Batting style	Bowling style	Notes
Batters
8	**Tim David**	Australia (Note: David has also played international cricket for Singapore.)	16 March 1996 (age 30)	Right-handed	Right-arm off break	Overseas player
12	**Aneurin Donald**	England	20 December 1996 (age 29)	Right-handed	Right-arm off break	
16	**Finn Allen**	New Zealand	22 April 1999 (age 27)	Right-handed	Right-arm off break	Overseas player
17	**Ben Duckett**	England	17 October 1994 (age 31)	Left-handed	Right-arm off break	England central contract
—	Louis Kimber	England	24 February 1997 (age 29)	Right-handed	Right-arm off break	
—	Ben Mayes	England	21 November 2007 (age 18)	Right-handed	Right-arm off break	
All-rounders
24	**Lewis Gregory**	England	24 May 1992 (age 34)	Right-handed	Right-arm fast-medium	
74	**Mitchell Santner**	New Zealand	5 February 1992 (age 34)	Left-handed	Slow left-arm orthodox	Overseas player
80	**Dan Mousley**	England	8 July 2001 (age 25)	Right-handed	Right-arm off break	
—	Ben Raine	England	14 September 1991 (age 35)	Right-handed	Right-arm fast-medium	Wildcard player
Wicket-keepers
7	**Sam Billings**	England	15 June 1991 (age 35)	Right-handed	—	Captain
18	**Tom Banton**	England	11 November 1998 (age 27)	Right-handed	—	Ruled out through injury
Pace bowlers
1	**Craig Overton**	England	10 April 1994 (age 32)	Right-handed	Right-arm fast-medium	
5	**Mohammad Amir**	Pakistan	13 April 1992 (age 34)	Left-handed	Left-arm fast-medium	UK passport; Replacement player
21	**Matt Henry**	New Zealand	14 December 1991 (age 34)	Right-handed	Right-arm fast-medium	Overseas player
26	Ben Sanderson	England	3 January 1989 (age 37)	Right-handed	Right-arm fast-medium	Wildcard player
—	**Brad Currie**	Scotland	8 November 1998 (age 27)	Right-handed	Left-arm fast-medium	Ruled out through injury
—	Matt Milnes	England	29 July 1994 (age 32)	Right-handed	Right-arm fast-medium	Replacement player
—	**David Payne**	England	15 February 1991 (age 35)	Right-handed	Left-arm fast-medium	Ruled out through injury
Spin bowlers
31	Calvin Harrison	England	29 April 1998 (age 28)	Right-handed	Right-arm leg break	Replacement player
—	**Danny Briggs**	England	30 April 1991 (age 35)	Right-handed	Slow left-arm orthodox	

== Seasons ==
=== Women's team ===
Season	Group stage							Playoff stage		Ref.
Season	Pld	W	L	T	NR	Pts	Pos	Pld	Pos	Ref.
2021	8	4	4	0	0	8	7th	Did not progress		
2022	6	3	3	0	0	6	3rd	1 (Note: Trent Rockets women qualified for the eliminator in 2022. They played one match, losing the playoff for the final against Southern Brave by 2 runs.)	3rd	
2023	8	3	4	0	1	7	4th	Did not progress		
2024	8	4	4	0	0	8	5th	Did not progress		
2025	8	4	4	0	0	16	4th	Did not progress		
2026	8	7	1	0	0	28	1st	1 (Note: Trent Rockets women qualified for the final in 2026. In the final, they played against Sunrisers Leeds, winning by 8 wickets.)	1st	

=== Men's team ===
Season	Group stage							Playoff stage		Ref.
Season	Pld	W	L	T	NR	Pts	Pos	Pld	Pos	Ref.
2021	8	5	3	0	0	10	3rd	1 (Note: Trent Rockets men qualified for the eliminator in 2022. They played one match, losing the playoff for the final against Southern Brave by 7 wickets.)	3rd	
2022	8	6	2	0	0	12	1st	1 (Note: Trent Rockets men finished top of the group stage and qualified automatically for the final in 2021. They won the final against Manchester Originals by 2 wickets.)	1st	
2023	8	3	4	0	1	7	5th	Did not progress		
2024	8	4	4	0	0	8	5th	Did not progress		
2025	8	6	2	0	0	24	2nd	2 (Note: Trent Rockets men qualified for the eliminator in 2025. In the eliminator against Northern Superchargers, rain caused the game to be abandoned due to rain. As Trent Rockets had finished in 2nd, they progressed to the final due to a better finishing position in the group stage. They played Oval Invincibles in the final, losing by 26 runs.)	2nd	
2026	8	7	1	0	0	28	1st	1 (Note: Trent Rockets men qualified for the final in 2026. In the final, they played against Manchester Super Giants, losing by 5 wickets.)	2nd	

== See also ==
- List of Trent Rockets cricketers
- List of cricket grounds in England and Wales
- List of Test cricket grounds
