= Lewis Gregory =

English cricketer (born 1992)

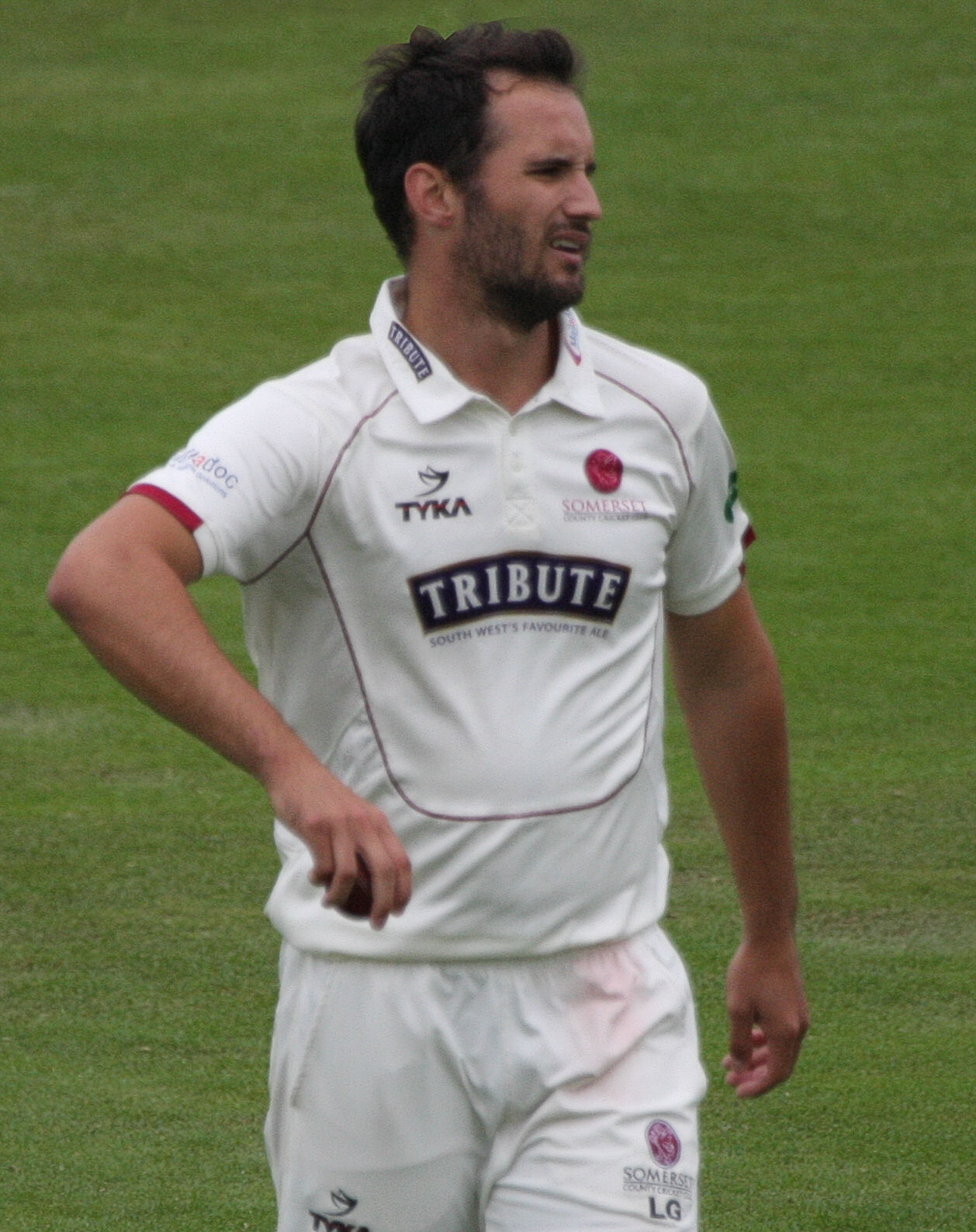
- Gregory in 2017

Personal information
- Born: 24 May 1992 (age 34); Plymouth, Devon, England
- Batting: Right-handed
- Bowling: Right-arm fast-medium
- Role: All-rounder

International information
- National side: England
- ODI debut (cap 261): 8 July 2021 v Pakistan
- Last ODI: 13 July 2021 v Pakistan
- T20I debut (cap 88): 1 November 2019 v New Zealand
- Last T20I: 16 July 2021 v Pakistan

Domestic team information
- Years: Team
- 2008–2010: Devon
- 2010–present: Somerset (squad no. 24)
- 2019/20: Rangpur Riders
- 2019/20: Peshawar Zalmi
- 2020/21: Brisbane Heat
- 2020/21: Islamabad United
- 2021–2024: Trent Rockets
- 2022: Karachi Kings
- 2023: Joburg Super Kings
- 2025: Manchester Originals
- 2026: Sunrisers Eastern Cape
- 2026: Trent Rockets

Career statistics
Competition	ODI	T20I	FC	LA
Matches	3	9	151	79
Runs scored	117	45	4,981	1,323
Batting average	58.50	7.50	25.67	24.96
100s/50s	0/1	0/0	4/23	1/8
Top score	77	15	137	105*
Balls bowled	114	78	21,001	3,062
Wickets	4	2	448	110
Bowling average	24.25	58.50	26.00	27.61
5 wickets in innings	0	0	18	0
10 wickets in match	0	0	3	0
Best bowling	3/44	1/10	7/84	4/23
Catches/stumpings	0/–	0/–	104/–	27/–
- Source: ESPNcricinfo, 27 September 2026

Lewis Gregory (born 24 May 1992) is an English cricketer who plays for Somerset County Cricket Club. A right-handed batsman and right-arm seam bowler, Gregory made his senior cricket debut in 2010, representing Somerset against the touring Pakistanis. He made his international debut for the England cricket team in November 2019.

== Domestic career ==
=== Early career: Youth and club cricket ===
Gregory represented Devon County Cricket Club at youth level, playing Under-13, Under-14, Under-15 and Under-17 cricket for the county. He made his club debut at the top level of club cricket, playing in the Devon Cricket League in 2006 at the age of 14, scoring 28 runs for Plympton Cricket Club. Throughout 2006 and 2007, he played primarily as a batsman, bowling infrequently and in short spells when he did so. In 2008, his bowling workload increased dramatically, and he finished the season with 20 wickets at an average of 17.40 for Plympton. In July 2008, Gregory was selected to represent the 'South and West' in the England and Wales Cricket Board (ECB) Regional Under-17 Festival, and scored a half-century in the first of his three matches.

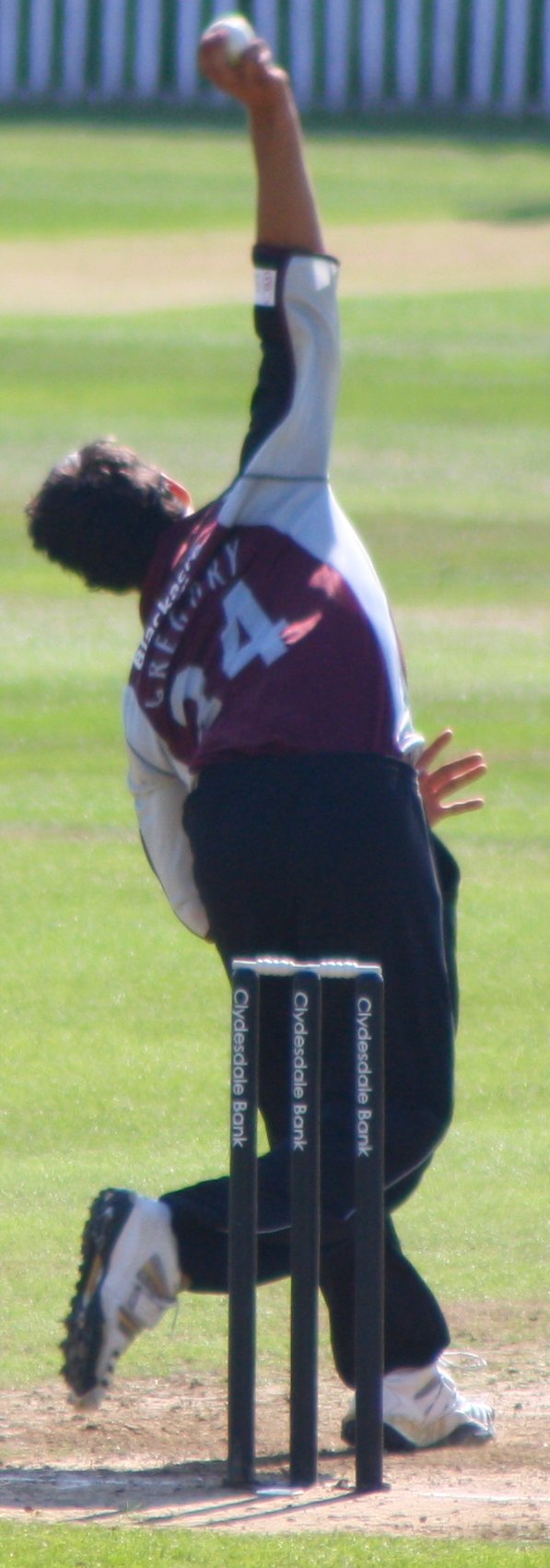
Lewis Gregory bowling on debut for Somerset.

The 2008 season also saw Gregory make his debut in the Minor Counties Championship for Devon, and play his first match for Somerset County Cricket Club, a Second XI contest against the Marylebone Cricket Club (MCC) Young Cricketers in which he scored 87 runs in Somerset's only innings. Gregory was Plympton's leading bowler in 2009, claiming 36 wickets at an average of 13.61, including two five-wicket hauls. He continued to play for Somerset Second XI, and occasionally for Devon throughout 2009 and 2010.

=== One-day debut ===
Following a string of good performances for England Under-19s and Somerset Second XI, including a hat-trick against Essex Second XI, Gregory made his List A debut for Somerset against the touring Pakistanis. He claimed four wickets in the match, before being bowled for a duck in Somerset's reply.

=== T20 franchise cricket ===
In November 2019, he was selected to play for the Rangpur Rangers in the 2019–20 Bangladesh Premier League. In December 2021, he was signed by the Karachi Kings following the players' draft for the 2022 Pakistan Super League. In April 2022, he was bought by the Trent Rockets for the 2022 season of The Hundred.

== International career ==
Gregory made his international debut for England Under-19s during their series against the touring Sri Lanka Under-19s. He claimed four wickets in two four-day matches against the tourists. He performed better in the shorter formats of the game, scoring 55 runs and sharing a 103-run partnership with Joe Root to orchestrate victory in the second Twenty20. In the second one-day match, he top-scored for England with 87, but despite claiming 1/16 in an economical bowling spell, he could not prevent Sri Lanka winning with over 15 overs to spare. Gregory was named as captain of the England Under-19s for the tour of Sri Lanka in January 2011.

Gregory received his first call-up to the England squad for the one-off One Day International (ODI) against Ireland in May 2015, but he did not play.

In July 2019, Gregory was named in England's Test squad for the one-off match against Ireland at Lord's, having also captained the England Lions against Australia A earlier in the month. However, he did not play in the Test against Ireland. In September 2019, he was named in England's Twenty20 International (T20I) squad for their series against New Zealand. He made his T20I debut for England, against New Zealand, on 1 November 2019, although he did not bat or bowl. In the second match of the series against New Zealand, Gregory became the second bowler for England to take a wicket with his first delivery in a T20I.

On 29 May 2020, Gregory was named in a 55-man group of players to begin training ahead of international fixtures starting in England following the COVID-19 pandemic. On 17 June 2020, Gregory was included in England's 30-man squad to start training behind closed doors for the Test series against the West Indies. On 9 July 2020, Gregory was also included in England's 24-man squad to start training behind closed doors for the One Day International (ODI) series against Ireland. On 27 July 2020, Gregory was named as one of three reserve players in England's squad for the ODI series. In November 2020, Gregory was named in England's ODI squad for their series against South Africa.

In July 2021, Gregory was named in England's ODI squad for their series against Pakistan, after the original squad for the tour was forced to withdraw following positive tests for COVID-19. Gregory made his ODI debut on 8 July 2021, for England against Pakistan.

Preceded by Tom Abell	Somerset County Cricket Club captain 2024–present	Succeeded by Incumbent
