= Alex Hales =

English cricketer (born 1989)

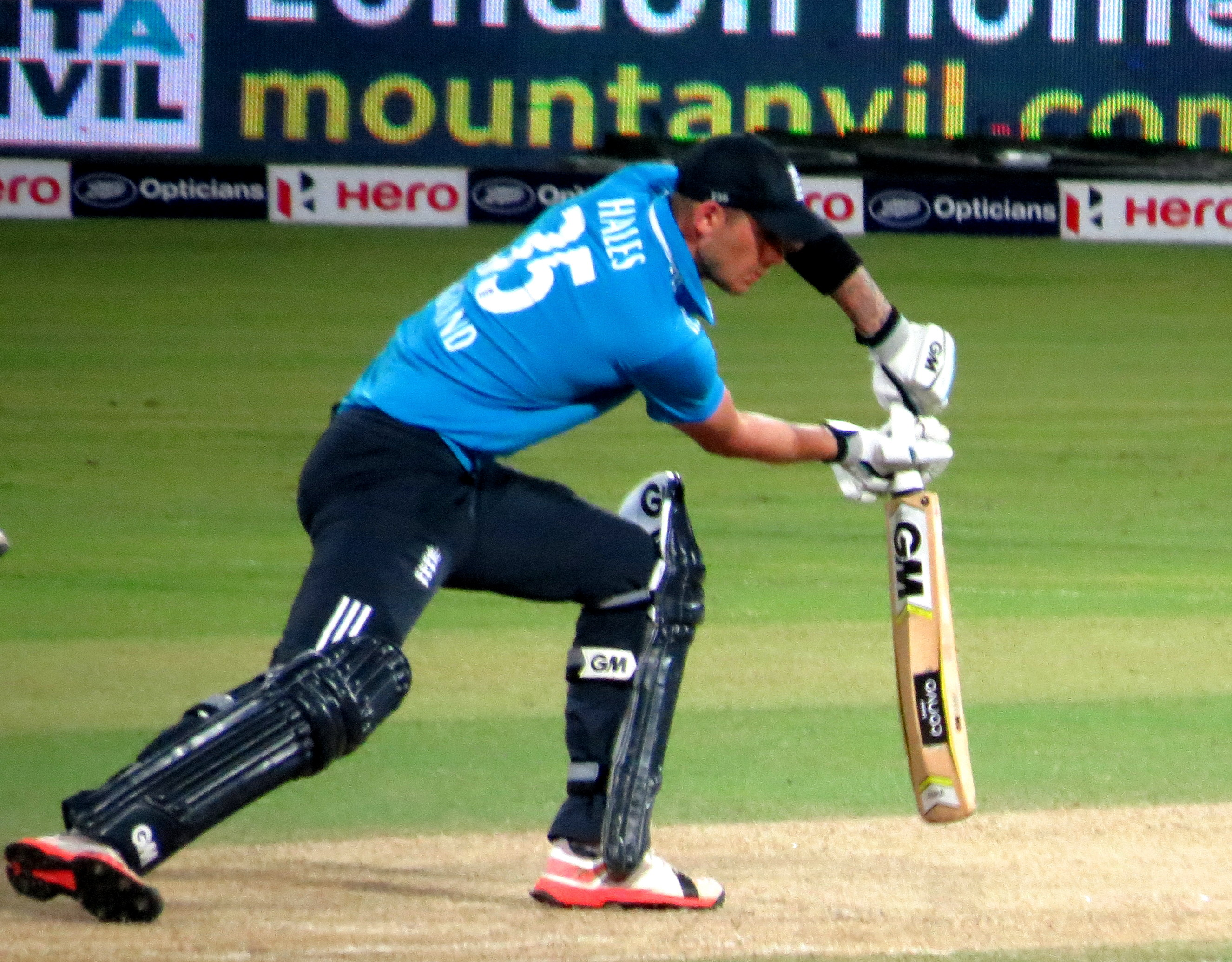
- Hales in 2014

Personal information
- Full name: Alexander Daniel Hales
- Born: 3 January 1989 (age 37); Hillingdon, London, England
- Batting: Right-handed
- Bowling: Right-arm medium
- Role: Opening batter

International information
- National side: England (2011–2022)
- Test debut (cap 669): 26 December 2015 v South Africa
- Last Test: 11 August 2016 v Pakistan
- ODI debut (cap 237): 27 August 2014 v India
- Last ODI: 2 March 2019 v West Indies
- ODI shirt no.: 10
- T20I debut (cap 55): 31 August 2011 v India
- Last T20I: 13 November 2022 v Pakistan
- T20I shirt no.: 10

Domestic team information
- Years: Team
- 2008–2024 (Note: Only teams Hales has played for in more than one season are listed here.): Nottinghamshire
- 2018–2019, 2021–2024: Islamabad United
- 2018/19, 2024/25: Rangpur Riders
- 2019–2024: Sydney Thunder
- 2021–2024: Trent Rockets
- 2023–2025: Desert Vipers

Career statistics
Competition	Test	ODI	T20I	FC
Matches	11	70	75	107
Runs scored	573	2,419	2,074	6,655
Batting average	27.28	37.79	30.95	37.81
100s/50s	0/5	6/14	1/12	13/38
Top score	94	171	116*	236
Balls bowled	18	–	–	311
Wickets	0	–	–	3
Bowling average	–	–	–	57.66
5 wickets in innings	–	–	–	0
10 wickets in match	–	–	–	0
Best bowling	–	–	–	2/63
Catches/stumpings	8/–	27/–	39/–	84/–
Medal record
Men's Cricket
Representing England
T20 World Cup
Winner	2022 Australia
Runner-up	2016 India
- Source: ESPNcricinfo, 16 October 2024

Alexander Daniel Hales (born 3 January 1989) is an English cricketer. He is a right-handed opening batter who represented the England cricket team across all formats and played domestically for Nottinghamshire. He made his One Day International debut against India in August 2014 and his Test cricket debut against South Africa in December 2015. Hales is the first English batter to score a T20I century, and had the highest individual score of an English batter in the format with his 116 not out against Sri Lanka in the 2014 ICC World Twenty20. He is also the first batter to be dismissed for 99 in an ODI and a T20I. Hales was a key member of the England team that won the 2022 T20 World Cup. In August 2023 Hales announced his retirement from international cricket, focusing on domestic and franchise T20 cricket.

== Background ==
Hales was born in Hillingdon and attended both Westbrook Hay School and Chesham High School, now Chesham Grammar School, in Buckinghamshire.

His father Gary broke several local batting records (including 321 not out for Gerrards Cross versus Chalfont St Peter in a limited overs league match) while his grandfather Dennis was a talented tennis player who once forced Rod Laver to five sets at Wimbledon.

== Domestic career ==
=== County cricket ===
Hales first came to national attention in 2005 when, as a sixteen-year-old, he hit 55 off a single over (three no-balls, eight sixes, one four) in a Cricket Idol T20 tournament at Lords. Ironically, he had been picked for his fast bowling ability.

Hales first represented Buckinghamshire in Minor Counties cricket during the 2006 season, and played for MCC Young Cricketers in the Second XI Championship of 2007. He then impressed whilst trialling with Nottinghamshire in 2007, scoring 218 in only his second appearance for the county, following it up with a hundred and two 95s. Notts offered him a two-year contract until the end of the 2009 season. He made his List A debut in a rain-affected match against Leicestershire in May 2008 and his first-class debut against Somerset in September 2008. During the 2009 season, after an impressive start, he signed a new two-year contract extension. On 29 August 2009, Alex hit the top score in the Pro40 2009, 150 off 102 balls for Nottinghamshire against Worcestershire at Trent Bridge.

In July 2011, Hales made a century for Nottinghamshire in the county championship, a score that, according to ESPNcricinfo marked him as "beginning to warrant the attention of the England selectors": it was the second century of his first-class career. He went on to make 184.

In May 2015, Hales hit six consecutive sixes across two overs on the opening day of the NatWest t20 Blast in his 86 not out against Birmingham.

On 5 August 2017, Hales hit 95 off 30 balls against Durham in the T-20 Blast competition.

=== The Hundred ===
Hales was allocated to the Trent Rockets as a 'local icon' at the inauguration of The Hundred in October 2019. After the first season was postponed due to COVID-19, he was retained for the 2021 season. He featured for the Trent Rockets in the first four seasons, but opted out of involvement in 2025 due to changes with England and Wales Cricket Board (ECB) regulations which would restrict him playing in overseas T20 competitions during the English summer.

== England ==
Hales represented England U19s in the summer of 2008 in a series of youth Test matches and ODIs against a touring New Zealand U19's, enjoying a successful time averaging 50 in the Tests and over 30 in the ODIs, including 3 half centuries. After just one season on the county circuit he was named in an England Performance Programme squad in the 09/10 winter. In the 2011 summer he was selected for the England Lions against Sri Lanka and was chosen for all the matches.

=== 2011–2012 India, West Indies and World T20 ===
Following an impressive year in domestic Twenty20, he was selected for the senior England squad to play India. He scored a two-ball duck on debut, however in the following series against the West Indies, he scored an unbeaten 62 in a 128-run stand with Craig Kieswetter as England won by 10 wickets. Hales kept his place in the team for the T20 match against India, but only scored 11 runs off 19 balls.

On 24 June 2012, England achieved their highest successful chase in Twenty20 internationals. Hales was man of the match, after scoring 99 before losing his wicket to a yorker bowled by Rampaul with the game almost won. Hales played in both games against South Africa, making scores of 11 in both innings, although he remained unbeaten in the second as the match was rained off. Alex Hales is the only batter to be dismissed for 99 in a T20I innings.

Now an integral part of England's T20 team, Hales played in the 2012 ICC World Twenty20. England beat Afghanistan to qualify from the group, with Hales being run out on 31. However, England were bowled out for 80 in the next game against India. In the super 8 stage, Hales again batted well against the West Indies, scoring 68. In that match against West Indies he along with Eoin Morgan set the record for the highest 4th wicket partnership in ICC World T20 history (107). After beating New Zealand, England lost to Sri Lanka, with Hales being dismissed for just 3, meaning England were knocked out of the tournament.

=== 2013–2014 New Zealand, Australia and T20 World Cup ===
Hales played in all three T20 games against New Zealand, now batting with his county teammate Michael Lumb. He made scores of 21, 5 and 80. In the third match of the series, in which Hales made 80, he participated in a 143 opening partnership with Lumb as England won by 10 wickets. In the return series Hales made 39 before the final match was abandoned. Hales made 94 in the second match against Australia, as he consolidated his position at the top of the ICC player rankings. Hales was less effective in the away series in Australia, scoring 22, 16 and 6. He was then selected in the limited overs tour of West Indies, where he was also expected to play in his first ODI. However, injury meant he could only play in the T20 series, where he made scores of 3, 40 and 38.

England were drawn in a tough group for the 2014 World T20. Hales made a second ball duck in the first match against New Zealand, but followed this up by an unbeaten 116 against Sri Lanka. In doing so he became the first Englishman to score a T20I century. In that same match he along with Eoin Morgan set the record for the highest 3rd wicket partnership in T20 World Cup history(152). However, although Hales made 38 against South Africa, England lost and were knocked out of the competition. They then suffered a humiliating defeat against the Netherlands in their final match, in which Hales made 12 as England were bowled out for 88.

=== 2014 Sri Lanka and India ===
Hales kept his place in the team for Peter Moores first game in charge of the T20 team against Sri Lanka. Although England lost, Hales top scored with 66.

Hales made his long-awaited ODI debut in the series against India. He started well, making scores of 42 and 40 in his first two games although England went on to lose them both. In the final two games of the series, he could only manage scores of 6 and 4 as England lost the series 3–1. He returned to form in the only T20 match between the two teams, hitting 40 to help England win the game.

He was selected in the squad for the series against Sri Lanka, but was surprisingly dropped for the first two games. He made 27 when he was recalled for the third ODI, batting in the middle order. In the fourth ODI he replaced suspended captain Alistair Cook at the top of the order, but was dismissed for a first ball duck. He made seven in the final match of the series.

=== 2015 World Cup ===
Hales was overlooked for the start of England's World Cup campaign and did not play until the must-win game against Bangladesh. He made 27 as England lost the game to go out of the tournament. He played in the final game against Afghanistan, making 37 as England won the match by nine wickets.

=== 2015 New Zealand ===
Hales was included in the squad for the five-ODI series at home against New Zealand. He scored 20 in the first match, but England went on to win by 210 runs. In the second ODI Hales performed more strongly, scoring 54 off 49 balls, but England lost by 13 runs in a close match. England lost the third ODI by 3 wickets, with Hales making 23. In the fourth ODI Hales scored 67 off 38 balls as England won by seven wickets. In the final game of the series, Hales was out for just one, but England went on to win the game by three wickets and the series 3–2. He made 27 as England won the one-off T20 match between the two teams.

=== 2015 Australia ===
In the only T20 between the two teams, Hales made just three, but England went on to win the game by five runs. Hales had a poor start to the ODI series, scoring 22 in the first game and 18 in the second, as England lost both games to go 2–0 down in the series. However, England won the third game, despite Hales continuing to struggle for form. In the fourth match, Hales was out for a duck, but England chased down Australia's total of 299 to level the five match series 2-2. Hales poor series ended with a score in 4 in the final game, which England lost to hand the series to Australia.

=== 2015 Pakistan ===
Despite being included in the Test squad to face Pakistan, Hales did not play in any Tests. He came into the team for the ODI series, and made in ten as England lost their opening game. He ended his poor run of form in the second match of the series, scoring 109 as England won by 95 runs. He made a score of 30 in the next match as England recorded a six wicket win to go 2–1 up in the series. England won the final game of the series, with Hales making a score of 22, to help England to a 3–1 series win.

=== 2016 South Africa ===
In the one-day series again Pakistan in the UAE, BBC Sport commentator Jonathan Agnew stated that Hales' technique was simply too fallible outside off stump, planting his front foot on middle stump and playing with a bat two feet away from his body. Agnew surmised that whilst in 20 and 50 over cricket with no slips Hales could get away with this issue, in test cricket he could not. In the first three tests in South Africa, Hales' technique was cruelly exposed by their fast-bowling attack. In the first Tests he made scores of 10 and 26, although England went on to win the game by 241 runs. In a high scoring second Test, Hales made 60 in the first innings but was dismissed for just five in the second. In the third Test, he was out for one in the first innings as England made 323. He was out for 18 in the second innings, as England went onto secure a seven wicket victory. In the final match of the series, he again struggled, and after making 15 in the first innings, he was out for just one in the second innings as England were bowled out for just 101. Despite the heavy defeat, England won the series 2–1.

However, in the ODI series, Hales returned to form in spectacular style. He scored 4 consecutive fifties and a century to garner Man of the Series. In the first ODI, Hales scored 57 off just 47 balls to put behind the poor Test series. He then went on to score 99 in the second ODI falling just short of his second ODI century. He continued this great form in the third ODI scoring 65 off 73 balls in a losing effort. In the fourth ODI, he scored yet another half-century scoring 50 off 56 balls in another losing effort. In the final ODI, he finally scored his second and well-deserved ODI century, scoring 112 off 128 balls finishing the series with 383 runs overall and the series highest run-scorer.

In the T20 series Hales scored 27 in the first game which England lost, before making a score of 16 in England's final match before the T20 World Cup, in which England were comprehensively beaten by nine wickets.

=== 2016 T20 World Cup ===
Hales made a score of 28 in England's opening game defeat against the West Indies, before making 17 in a historic run chase against South Africa. After missing the third game against Afghanistan through injury, Hales returned for the crucial game against Sri Lanka, and although he was out for a duck, England won the game. He made 20 in the semi-final against New Zealand as England booked their place in the final, but he was out for just one against the West Indies as England finished as runners-up.

=== 2016 Sri Lanka ===
Hales retained his place in the test team for the Sri Lanka series, but after much debate by the selectors. He repaid their faith in the first test at Headingley by scoring 86, and sharing a century partnership with Jonny Bairstow when England were in trouble. England went on to win the match by an innings and 88 runs. In the first innings of the second test he again gave himself a good start of 83, but failed to reach his first Test century. He was out for just eleven in the second innings as England secured a nine wicket victory. In the third and final test at Lord's, Hales scored just 18 runs in the first innings, but made a brilliant 94 in the second innings, and was dismissed lbw by Angelo Mathews just six runs short of a place on the honours board. The third match ended in a draw, with England winning the series 2–0.

Hales made just 4 in the first ODI against Sri Lanka, as the match ended in a tie, with both teams posting 286. In the second match he made 133 not out and was involved in a record breaking partnership with Jason Roy as England won by ten wickets after reaching 256/0. In the third match he was out for a duck in a rain affected match, and did not bat in the fourth match which England won, due to injury. The injury ruled him out of the final match of the series, which England won to take the series 3–0.

=== 2016 Pakistan ===
Hales was out for six in the first innings in the first Test against Pakistan, and then made 16 in the second innings as England lost by 75 runs. England won the second Test, although Hales only scored 34 runs in the match. After scoring 17 in the first innings of the third Test, Hales scored 54 in the second innings to help England turn the game around and win by 141 runs. Hales again struggled in the final Test, scoring just six in England's first innings as they were dismissed for 328 and just 12 in the second innings, as England suffered a ten-wicket defeat and drew the series, 2–2. Hales made scores of seven and 14 in the first two ODIs as England went 2–0 up in the series. In the third ODI Hales achieved the highest ever individual ODI score posting 171 during the third ODI against Pakistan on his home soil at Trent Bridge. The record was previously held by Robin Smith for 23 years. Hales' ton helped England achieve the highest ever team ODI score in the same game with England posting 444–3, bettering the previous record of 443 by Sri Lanka back in 2006 against the Dutch at Amstelveen. England won the match by 169 runs as well to seal the series. In the fourth ODI Hales made eight as England chased down Pakistan's target of 248 to go 4–0 up in the series. In the final match, Hales could only manage 23 as England lost their first game of the series, with it finishing 4–1. Hales top-scored for England with 37 in the only T20I between the two teams, but England lost by nine wickets.

=== 2017 India ===
After missing the series against Bangladesh due to safety concerns, Hales played in the first ODI against India and made nine in England's total of 350 runs, although England lost by three wickets. In the second ODI he made 14 as England lost by 15 runs. Injury ruled Hales out of the rest of the series.

=== 2017 West Indies ===
Hales missed the first two matches against the West Indies through injury, but returned in the final game, making 110 as England made 328 and won by 186 runs.

=== 2017 Ireland ===
Hales scored 55 from 47 balls in the 1st ODI in a modest chase of 127 which England accomplished in 20 overs and made 32 of 35 balls in the 2nd ODI which England also won by 8 runs.

=== 2017 South Africa ===
Hales started well in the ODI series with 61 off 60 balls in a 72 run for England in the 1st ODI, however, he could only make 24 off 28 balls in the next match and would follow it up with a 2-ball 1 in the 3rd ODI where England were bundled out for a poor 153. He made 47 off 38 balls in the first T20 and then was not in the squad for the 2nd T20, although he came back for the 3rd T20 where he scored 36 from 28 balls.

=== 2017 Champions Trophy ===
He started off the tournament sublimely with a blazing 86-ball 95, although missing out on a hundred, his good form continued with 56 from 62 balls against New Zealand, however, he was bowled for a duck in the last group stage encounter against Australia and could only make 11 against Pakistan in the semi-final which England lost.

=== 2019 Cricket World Cup ===
In April 2019, he was named in England's squad for the 2019 Cricket World Cup. However, two days after the England squad was named, Hales made himself unavailable for Nottinghamshire's fixture against Lancashire in the 2019 Royal London One-Day Cup citing "personal reasons". Nottinghamshire posted a statement on their website stating that no timetable had been made for his return to cricket. On 26 April 2019, it was confirmed that Hales had failed a drugs test for use of a recreational drug, and had been banned for 21 days. On 29 April 2019, the ECB announced that Hales had been dropped from England's preliminary World Cup squad and all England squads ahead of the international season. Hales was not called up for England for the rest of England captain Eoin Morgan's tenure, with Morgan stating that Hales had lost the trust of the team.

=== 2022 T20 World Cup ===
In September 2022, Hales was called back to the English T20 squad for the T20 World Cup, as a late replacement for the injured Jonny Bairstow. After a couple of middling scores in the first two games, Hales hit a good run of form alongside the batting with his captain, Jos Buttler. The pair followed partnerships of 81 and 75 against New Zealand and Sri Lanka with a record opening-partnership of 170 in the semi-final against India. Hales hit 86 not-out, winning the Man of the Match award and saw his team into the final. England went on to win the match, and their second T20 World Cup.

== Domestic T20 Leagues ==
=== Indian Premier League ===
On 14 March 2015, Hales signed for Mumbai Indians for the final match of the regular season and the knockout stages replacing injured Corey Anderson. However, he ended his short stint without making a single appearance for the team.

After going unsold in the 2018 IPL auction, on 31 March 2018, it was announced that Hales would join Sunrisers Hyderabad for the 2018 season replacing David Warner. Hales made his IPL debut against Rajasthan Royals on 29 April 2018 and scored 45. Hales again went unsold in the 2021 IPL auction. In February 2022, he was bought by the Kolkata Knight Riders in the auction for the 2022 Indian Premier League tournament but later pulled out for personal reasons.

=== Big Bash League ===
Hales has played for Melbourne Renegades, Adelaide Strikers, Hobart Hurricanes, and Sydney Thunder. Playing for Sydney Thunder, Hales finished as top scorer in the 2020–21 Big Bash League season.

=== Pakistan Super League ===
Hales was picked by Islamabad United in 2018 Pakistan Super League Draft. On 1 December 2018, Hales hit a record 87 not out off just 32 balls playing for Maratha Arabians. On 25 January 2019 Alex struck his first BPL century off 47 balls for the Rangpur Riders

In September 2019, he was named in the squad for the Durban Heat team for the 2019 Mzansi Super League tournament. In July 2020, he was named in the Barbados Tridents squad for the 2020 Caribbean Premier League. In December 2021, he was signed by Islamabad United following the players' draft for the 2022 Pakistan Super League. On 15 February 2022, he pulled out of PSL due to bubble fatigue. He made a surprise return to PSL ahead of the Islamabad United's first eliminator playoff game against Peshawar Zalmi.

=== Bangladesh Premier League ===
Alex Hales has signed up for BPL franchise Rangpur Riders for the 2018–19 season, their CEO Ishtiaque Sadeque has confirmed. Hales became Riders' first of the two signings from outside the draft, apart from their four retained players Chris Gayle, Mashrafe Mortaza, Nazmul Islam and Mohammad Mithun.

Caribbean Premier League

Hales signed for Barbados Tridents for CPL 2019. 2025 he won the league with Trinbago Knight Riders and was resigned for the 2026 season.

== Controversy ==
In September 2017, Hales, along with teammate Ben Stokes, was charged with bringing the game into disrepute by the England and Wales Cricket Board (ECB). The charge related to an incident that took place outside a Bristol nightclub, in September 2017, several hours after England had played a one-day international against the West Indies at the County Ground in the city. Stokes was charged with affray over the incident by police and the ECB deferred its disciplinary hearing until the legal proceedings had finished.

In December 2018, the Cricket Disciplinary Commission reached a verdict in response to Hales's behaviour in Bristol and in relation to "inappropriate images". The Commission banned Hales for six white-ball matches, two of which had been served and the remaining four were suspended. Hales was also fined £17,500, £10,000 of which was suspended for 12 months. Hales was also required to undertake "appropriate training" at his own cost.

In April 2019, Hales tested positive for a recreational drug as he underwent a hair follicle test. According to a report published by the Guardian, Hales was subjected to a ban by the England and Wales Cricket Board (ECB) for 21 days as it was his second violation along with his removal from England's squad in the 2019 Cricket World Cup and all squads ahead of the international season. Hales' ban followed him pulling out of Nottinghamshire's Royal London One Day Cup campaign due to "personal reasons".
