= 2019 Loughborough Lightning (women's cricket) season =

Cricket Season of 2019

Loughborough Lightning
2019 season
- Coach: Rob Taylor
- Captain: Georgia Elwiss
- Overseas player: Chamari Atapattu; Mignon du Preez; Hayley Matthews
- WCSL: 3rd
- Most runs: Amy Jones (309)
- Most wickets: Sarah Glenn (11); Kirstie Gordon (11)
- Most catches: Hayley Matthews (7)
- Most wicket-keeping dismissals: Amy Jones (8)

The 2019 season was Loughborough Lightning's fourth and final season, in which they competed in the final edition of the Women's Cricket Super League, a Twenty20 competition. The side finished second in the group stage, winning seven of their ten matches, therefore progressing to the semi-final. However, they lost to Southern Vipers in the semi-final by 5 wickets.

The side was captained by Georgia Elwiss and coached by Rob Taylor. They played four of their home matches at the Haslegrave Ground and one at Trent Bridge. Following the season, women's domestic cricket in England was reformed, with the creation of new "regional hubs", with Loughborough Lightning replaced by Lightning, which retained some elements of the original team but represent a larger area.

== Squad ==
Loughborough Lightning's 15-player squad is listed below. Age given is at the start of Loughborough Lightning's first match of the season (6 August 2019).

| Name | Nationality | Birth date | Batting Style | Bowling Style | Notes |
Batters
| Georgia Adams | England | 4 October 1993 (aged 25) | Right-handed | Right-arm off break | |
| Mignon du Preez | South Africa | 13 June 1989 (aged 30) | Right-handed | Right-arm medium | Overseas player |
All-rounders
| Chamari Atapattu | Sri Lanka | 9 February 1990 (aged 29) | Left-handed | Right-arm medium | Overseas player |
| Kathryn Bryce | Scotland | 17 November 1997 (aged 21) | Right-handed | Right-arm medium | |
| Jo Gardner | England | 25 March 1997 (aged 22) | Right-handed | Right-arm medium | |
| Jenny Gunn | England | 9 May 1986 (aged 33) | Right-handed | Right-arm medium | |
| Georgia Elwiss | England | 31 May 1991 (aged 28) | Right-handed | Right-arm medium | Captain |
| Hayley Matthews | West Indies | 19 March 1998 (aged 21) | Right-handed | Right-arm off break | Overseas player |
| Alice Monaghan | England | 20 March 2000 (aged 19) | Right-handed | Right-arm medium | |
Wicket-keepers
| Abigail Freeborn | England | 12 November 1996 (aged 22) | Right-handed | — | |
| Amy Jones | England | 13 June 1993 (aged 26) | Right-handed | — | |
Bowlers
| Sarah Glenn | England | 27 February 1999 (aged 20) | Right-handed | Right-arm leg break | |
| Kirstie Gordon | England | 20 October 1997 (aged 21) | Right-handed | Slow left-arm orthodox | |
| Lucy Higham | England | 17 October 1997 (aged 21) | Right-handed | Right-arm off break | |
| Tara Norris | England | 4 June 1998 (aged 21) | Left-handed | Left-arm medium | |

== Women's Cricket Super League ==
=== Season standings ===
| Pos | Team | Pld | W | L | T | NR | BP | Pts | NRR |
|---|---|---|---|---|---|---|---|---|---|
| 1 | Western Storm | 10 | 9 | 1 | 0 | 0 | 3 | 39 | 1.109 |
| 2 | Loughborough Lightning | 10 | 7 | 3 | 0 | 0 | 4 | 32 | 0.792 |
| 3 | Southern Vipers | 10 | 4 | 4 | 1 | 1 | 2 | 22 | 0.425 |
| 4 | Yorkshire Diamonds | 10 | 5 | 5 | 0 | 0 | 0 | 20 | −0.456 |
| 5 | Surrey Stars | 10 | 3 | 6 | 0 | 1 | 2 | 16 | −0.857 |
| 6 | Lancashire Thunder | 10 | 0 | 9 | 1 | 0 | 0 | 2 | −1.194 |

Source: ESPN Cricinfo

Advanced to the Final.
Advanced to the Semi-final.

=== League stage ===
6 August 2019
16:00
Scorecard

| Loughborough Lightning; 125/6 (20 overs) | v | Western Storm; 126/3 (17 overs) |
| Amy Jones 65 (53); Freya Davies 2/24 (4 overs) | | Heather Knight 41 (39); Sarah Glenn 2/13 (3 overs) |

Western Storm won by 7 wickets
Haslegrave Ground, Loughborough
Umpires: Mark Newell and Rob White
Player of the match: Heather Knight (Western Storm)

- Loughborough Lightning won the toss and elected to bat.
- Points: Western Storm 4, Loughborough Lightning 0

8 August 2019
16:00
Scorecard

| Loughborough Lightning; 135/5 (20 overs) | v | Southern Vipers; 136/8 (19.3 overs) |
| Georgia Elwiss 37 (31); Paige Scholfield 1/12 (2 overs) | | Danni Wyatt 40 (33); Kirstie Gordon 2/24 (4 overs) |

Southern Vipers won by 2 wickets
Haslegrave Ground, Loughborough
Umpires: James Middlebrook and Sue Redfern
Player of the match: Stafanie Taylor (Southern Vipers)

- Loughborough Lightning won the toss and elected to bat.
- Points: Southern Vipers 4, Loughborough Lightning 0

11 August 2019
11:00
Scorecard

| Yorkshire Diamonds; 121/6 (20 overs) | v | Loughborough Lightning; 122/1 (13.2 overs) |
| Alice Davidson-Richards 27 (23); Kirstie Gordon 2/27 (4 overs) | | Hayley Matthews 54* (39); Linsey Smith 1/7 (2 overs) |

Loughborough Lightning won by 9 wickets
Headingley, Leeds
Umpires: Sue Redfern and Rob White
Player of the match: Hayley Matthews (Loughborough Lightning)

- Loughborough Lightning won the toss and elected to field.
- Points: Loughborough Lightning 5, Yorkshire Diamonds 0

13 August 2019
14:30
Scorecard

| Western Storm; 158/4 (20 overs) | v | Loughborough Lightning; 118 (18.2 overs) |
| Rachel Priest 55 (43); Georgia Elwiss 1/21 (3 overs) | | Mignon du Preez 30 (24); Freya Davies 4/27 (4 overs) |

Western Storm won by 40 runs
County Ground, Bristol
Umpires: Martin Saggers and David Millns
Player of the match: Freya Davies (Western Storm)

- Loughborough Lightning won the toss and elected to field.
- Points: Western Storm 5, Loughborough Lightning 0

15 August 2019
14:30
Scorecard

| Surrey Stars; 120/7 (20 overs) | v | Loughborough Lightning; 123/3 (14.5 overs) |
| Lizelle Lee 25 (21); Hayley Matthews 2/12 (4 overs) | | Mignon du Preez 70* (41); Dane van Niekerk 1/16 (3 overs) |

Loughborough Lightning won by 7 wickets
Woodbridge Road, Guildford
Umpires: Hassan Adnan and Chris Watts
Player of the match: Mignon du Preez (Loughborough Lightning)

- Loughborough Lightning won the toss and elected to field.
- Points: Loughborough Lightning 5, Surrey Stars 0

18 August 2019
14:30
Scorecard

| Yorkshire Diamonds; 129 (20 overs) | v | Loughborough Lightning; 135/4 (19.1 overs) |
| Jemimah Rodrigues 58 (40); Hayley Matthews 2/19 (4 overs) | | Mignon du Preez 38* (22); Beth Langston 1/17 (4 overs) |

Loughborough Lightning won by 6 wickets
Haslegrave Ground, Loughborough
Umpires: Neil Pratt and Ian Ramage
Player of the match: Mignon du Preez (Loughborough Lightning)

- Yorkshire Diamonds won the toss and elected to bat.
- Points: Loughborough Lightning 4, Yorkshire Diamonds 0

20 August 2019
18:30
Scorecard

| Loughborough Lightning; 157/7 (20 overs) | v | Lancashire Thunder; 74/6 (13.4 overs) |
| Georgia Adams 50 (33); Sophie Ecclestone 3/17 (4 overs) | | Suné Luus 30 (33); Kirstie Gordon 3/18 (3.4 overs) |

Loughborough Lightning won by 35 runs (DLS)
Old Trafford, Manchester
Umpires: Tim Robinson and Nick Cook
Player of the match: Georgia Adams (Loughborough Lightning)

- Lancashire Thunder won the toss and elected to field.
- Points: Loughborough Lightning 5, Lancashire Thunder 0

23 August 2019
16:00
Scorecard

| Surrey Stars; 147/7 (20 overs) | v | Loughborough Lightning; 150/5 (18.3 overs) |
| Nat Sciver 53 (35); Jenny Gunn 2/19 (4 overs) | | Mignon du Preez 48 (25); Mady Villiers 1/6 (3 overs) |

Loughborough Lightning won by 5 wickets
Haslegrave Ground, Loughborough
Umpires: Neil Pratt and Mary Waldron
Player of the match: Mignon du Preez (Loughborough Lightning)

- Surrey Stars won the toss and elected to bat.
- Loughborough Lightning 4, Surrey Stars 0

25 August 2019
11:30
Scorecard

| Lancashire Thunder; 122 (19.5 overs) | v | Loughborough Lightning; 123/2 (16.1 overs) |
| Sophia Dunkley 29 (21); Jenny Gunn 3/14 (3.5 overs) | | Amy Jones 66 (52); Alex Hartley 1/21 (3.1 overs) |

Loughborough Lightning won by 8 wickets
Trent Bridge, Nottingham
Umpires: Graham Lloyd and Jeremy Lloyds
Player of the match: Amy Jones (Loughborough Lightning)

- Lancashire Thunder won the toss and elected to bat.
- Points: Loughborough Lightning 4, Lancashire Thunder 0

28 August 2019
18:30
Scorecard

| Loughborough Lightning; 163/4 (20 overs) | v | Southern Vipers; 127 (19 overs) |
| Amy Jones 74 (53); Amanda-Jade Wellington 2/22 (4 overs) | | Fi Morris 36 (31); Chamari Atapattu 3/18 (4 overs) |

Loughborough Lightning won by 36 runs
Rose Bowl, Southampton
Umpires: James Middlebrook and Rob White
Player of the match: Amy Jones (Loughborough Lightning)

- Southern Vipers won the toss and elected to field.
- Points: Loughborough Lightning 5, Southern Vipers 0

=== Semi-final ===
1 September 2019
12:00
Scorecard

| Loughborough Lightning; 143 (19.5 overs) | v | Southern Vipers; 145/5 (19 overs) |
| Georgia Elwiss 28 (22); Suzie Bates 3/22 (2.5 overs) | | Suzie Bates 37 (25); Georgia Elwiss 1/21 (4 overs) |

Southern Vipers won by 5 wickets
County Ground, Hove
Umpires: Mark Newell and Rob White
Player of the match: Suzie Bates (Southern Vipers)

- Loughborough Lightning won the toss and elected to bat.

== Statistics ==
=== Batting ===
| Player | Matches | Innings | NO | Runs | HS | Average | Strike rate | 100s | 50s | 4s | 6s |
|---|---|---|---|---|---|---|---|---|---|---|---|
| Georgia Adams | 11 | 9 | 3 | 169 | 50 | 28.16 | 113.42 | 0 | 1 | 11 | 5 |
| Chamari Atapattu | 11 | 11 | 1 | 196 | 45 | 19.60 | 93.33 | 0 | 0 | 23 | 3 |
| Kathryn Bryce | 9 | 4 | 3 | 42 | 32 | 42.00 | 140.00 | 0 | 0 | 8 | 0 |
| Mignon du Preez | 11 | 9 | 3 | 267 | 70* | 44.50 | 147.51 | 0 | 1 | 23 | 12 |
| Georgia Elwiss | 10 | 8 | 0 | 171 | 38 | 21.37 | 108.91 | 0 | 0 | 14 | 2 |
| Abigail Freeborn | 3 | 2 | 1 | 29 | 15 | 29.00 | 103.57 | 0 | 0 | 5 | 0 |
| Jo Gardner | 3 | 1 | 0 | 0 | 0 | 0.00 | 0.00 | 0 | 0 | 0 | 0 |
| Sarah Glenn | 11 | 3 | 1 | 9 | 5 | 4.50 | 81.81 | 0 | 0 | 1 | 0 |
| Kirstie Gordon | 10 | 2 | 0 | 0 | 0 | 0.00 | 0.00 | 0 | 0 | 0 | 0 |
| Jenny Gunn | 11 | 6 | 4 | 57 | 17* | 28.50 | 150.00 | 0 | 0 | 5 | 2 |
| Lucy Higham | 8 | 1 | 0 | 0 | 0 | 0.00 | 0.00 | 0 | 0 | 0 | 0 |
| Amy Jones | 11 | 11 | 2 | 309 | 74* | 34.33 | 114.86 | 0 | 3 | 31 | 8 |
| Hayley Matthews | 9 | 8 | 1 | 133 | 54* | 19.00 | 105.55 | 0 | 1 | 22 | 1 |
| Tara Norris | 3 | 1 | 0 | 0 | 0 | 0.00 | 0.00 | 0 | 0 | 0 | 0 |
Source: ESPN Cricinfo

=== Bowling ===
| Player | Matches | Innings | Overs | Maidens | Runs | Wickets | BBI | Average | Economy | Strike rate |
|---|---|---|---|---|---|---|---|---|---|---|
| Chamari Atapattu | 11 | 9 | 19.0 | 0 | 121 | 5 | 3/18 | 24.20 | 6.36 | 22.8 |
| Kathryn Bryce | 9 | 9 | 29.0 | 1 | 191 | 8 | 2/16 | 23.87 | 6.58 | 21.7 |
| Georgia Elwiss | 10 | 9 | 22.0 | 0 | 159 | 7 | 1/7 | 22.71 | 7.22 | 18.8 |
| Jo Gardner | 3 | 3 | 7.0 | 0 | 65 | 2 | 1/16 | 32.50 | 9.28 | 21.0 |
| Sarah Glenn | 11 | 11 | 34.0 | 0 | 206 | 11 | 3/25 | 18.72 | 6.05 | 18.5 |
| Kirstie Gordon | 10 | 10 | 36.4 | 0 | 222 | 11 | 3/18 | 20.18 | 6.05 | 20.0 |
| Jenny Gunn | 11 | 11 | 27.5 | 0 | 187 | 10 | 3/14 | 18.70 | 6.71 | 16.7 |
| Lucy Higham | 8 | 1 | 2.0 | 0 | 16 | 1 | 1/16 | 16.00 | 8.00 | 12.0 |
| Hayley Matthews | 9 | 8 | 27.3 | 1 | 169 | 9 | 2/1 | 18.77 | 6.14 | 18.3 |
| Tara Norris | 3 | 3 | 3.0 | 0 | 32 | 0 | – | – | 10.66 | – |
Source: ESPN Cricinfo

=== Fielding ===
| Player | Matches | Innings | Catches |
|---|---|---|---|
| Georgia Adams | 11 | 11 | 6 |
| Chamari Atapattu | 11 | 11 | 5 |
| Kathryn Bryce | 9 | 9 | 0 |
| Mignon du Preez | 11 | 11 | 2 |
| Georgia Elwiss | 10 | 10 | 1 |
| Abigail Freeborn | 3 | 3 | 0 |
| Jo Gardner | 3 | 3 | 0 |
| Sarah Glenn | 11 | 11 | 2 |
| Kirstie Gordon | 10 | 10 | 2 |
| Jenny Gunn | 11 | 11 | 2 |
| Lucy Higham | 8 | 8 | 2 |
| Hayley Matthews | 9 | 9 | 7 |
| Tara Norris | 3 | 3 | 2 |
Source: ESPN Cricinfo

=== Wicket-keeping ===
| Player | Matches | Innings | Catches | Stumpings |
|---|---|---|---|---|
| Amy Jones | 11 | 11 | 2 | 6 |
Source: ESPN Cricinfo
