= 2018 Loughborough Lightning (women's cricket) season =

Loughborough Lightning
2018 season
- Coach: Rob Taylor
- Captain: Georgia Elwiss
- Overseas player: Sophie Devine; Rachael Haynes; Elyse Villani
- WCSL: Runners-up
- Most runs: Rachael Haynes (324)
- Most wickets: Kirstie Gordon (17)
- Most catches: Rachael Haynes (10)
- Most wicket-keeping dismissals: Amy Jones (11)

The 2018 season was Loughborough Lightning's third season, in which they competed in the Women's Cricket Super League, a Twenty20 competition. The side topped the initial group stage, winning seven of their ten matches, therefore progressing straight to the final. However, they lost in the final to Surrey Stars by 66 runs.

The side was coached by the newly appointed Rob Taylor and captained by Georgia Elwiss. They played four of their home matches at the Haslegrave Ground, and the other at Edgbaston Cricket Ground.

== Squad ==
Loughborough Lightning's 15-player squad is listed below. Age given is at the start of Loughborough Lightning's first match of the season (22 July 2018).

Name	Nationality	Birth date	Batting style	Bowling style	Notes
Batters
Georgia Adams	England	4 October 1993 (aged 24)	Right-handed	Right-arm off break	
Rachael Haynes	Australia	26 December 1986 (aged 31)	Left-handed	Left-arm medium	Overseas player
Elyse Villani	Australia	6 October 1989 (aged 28)	Right-handed	Right-arm medium	Overseas player
All-rounders
Sophie Devine	New Zealand	1 September 1989 (aged 28)	Right-handed	Right-arm medium	Overseas player
Georgia Elwiss	England	31 May 1991 (aged 27)	Right-handed	Right-arm medium	Captain
Jo Gardner	England	25 March 1997 (aged 21)	Right-handed	Right-arm medium	
Jenny Gunn	England	9 May 1986 (aged 32)	Right-handed	Right-arm medium	
Wicket-keepers
Abigail Freeborn	England	12 November 1996 (aged 21)	Right-handed	—	
Amy Jones	England	13 June 1993 (aged 25)	Right-handed	—	
Bowlers
Sarah Glenn	England	27 February 1999 (aged 19)	Right-handed	Right arm leg break	
Kirstie Gordon	England	20 October 1997 (aged 20)	Right-handed	Slow left-arm orthodox	
Lucy Higham	England	17 October 1997 (aged 20)	Right-handed	Right-arm off break	
Tara Norris	England	4 June 1998 (aged 20)	Left-handed	Left-arm medium	
Sonia Odedra	England	3 June 1988 (aged 30)	Right-handed	Right-arm medium	
Linsey Smith	England	10 March 1995 (aged 23)	Left-handed	Slow left-arm orthodox	

== Women's Cricket Super League ==
=== Season standings ===
Pos	Team	Pld	W	L	T	NR	BP	Pts	NRR
1	Loughborough Lightning	10	7	3	0	0	5	33	1.361
2	Western Storm	10	6	3	0	1	4	30	0.919
3	Surrey Stars	10	5	4	0	1	2	24	−0.404
4	Lancashire Thunder	10	5	5	0	0	1	21	−0.825
5	Yorkshire Diamonds	10	3	6	0	1	1	15	−0.290
6	Southern Vipers	10	2	7	0	1	0	10	−0.490

Source: ESPN Cricinfo

Advanced to the Final.
Advanced to the Semi-final.

=== League stage ===
22 July 2018
14:30
Scorecard

Lancashire Thunder; 72 (16.5 overs)	v	Loughborough Lightning; 74/4 (15.1 overs)
Evelyn Jones 19 (20); Jenny Gunn 3/10 (3 overs)		Georgia Adams 22 (19); Alex Hartley 2/12 (4 overs)

Loughborough Lightning won by 6 wickets
Trafalgar Road Ground, Southport
Umpires: Rob White and Ian Ramage

- Loughborough Lightning won the toss and elected to field.
- Points: Loughborough Lightning 5, Lancashire Thunder 0

25 July 2018
14:30
Scorecard

Southern Vipers; 105 (19.3 overs)	v	Loughborough Lightning; 109/4 (18.5 overs)
Tammy Beaumont 37 (39); Sophie Devine 3/21 (4 overs)		Elyse Villani 35 (33); Amelia Kerr 1/6 (4 overs)

Loughborough Lightning won by 6 wickets
Rose Bowl, Southampton
Umpires: Steve O'Shaughnessy and Neil Mallender

- Loughborough Lightning won the toss and elected to field.
- Points: Loughborough Lightning 4, Southern Vipers 0

29 July 2018
10:30
Scorecard

Western Storm; 85/2 (6 overs)	v	Loughborough Lightning; 67/0 (6 overs)
Smriti Mandhana 52* (19); Georgia Elwiss 1/17 (1 over)		Sophie Devine 46* (21)

Western Storm won by 18 runs
County Ground, Taunton
Umpires: Mike Burns and Ian Gould
Player of the match: Smriti Mandhana (Western Storm)

- Loughborough Lightning won the toss and elected to field.
- Match reduced to 6 over per side due to rain.
- Points: Western Storm 5, Loughborough Lightning 0

31 July 2018
14:30
Scorecard

Loughborough Lightning; 143/6 (20 overs)	v	Yorkshire Diamonds; 102/9 (20 overs)
Rachael Haynes 50 (41); Katie Levick 2/24 (4 overs)		Thea Brookes 30 (19); Kirstie Gordon 2/10 (3 overs)

Loughborough Lightning won by 41 runs
Haslegrave Ground, Loughborough
Umpires: Tom Lungley and Sue Redfern

- Loughborough Lightning won the toss and elected to bat.
- Points: Loughborough Lightning 5, Yorkshire Diamonds 0

2 August 2018
14:30
Scorecard

Surrey Stars; 95 (18 overs)	v	Loughborough Lightning; 96/1 (10 overs)
Nat Sciver 45 (35); Kirstie Gordon 3/13 (4 overs)		Sophie Devine 61* (32); Marizanne Kapp 1/17 (4 overs)

Loughborough Lightning won by 9 wickets
Haslegrave Ground, Loughborough
Umpires: Chris Watts and Rob White

- Surrey Stars won the toss and elected to bat.
- Points: Loughborough Lightning 5, Surrey Stars 0

4 August 2018
14:30
Scorecard

Southern Vipers; 172/6 (20 overs)	v	Loughborough Lightning; 174/7 (19.4 overs)
Sara McGlashan 55* (28); Georgia Elwiss 2/46 (4 overs)		Elyse Villani 61* (38); Danni Wyatt 1/4 (1 over)

Loughborough Lightning won by 3 wickets
Haslegrave Ground, Loughborough
Umpires: Sue Redfern and Ian Ramage
Player of the match: Elyse Villani (Loughborough Lightning)

- Southern Vipers won the toss and elected to bat.
- Points: Loughborough Lightning 4, Southern Vipers 0

9 August 2018
14:30
Scorecard

Loughborough Lightning; 100/7 (13 overs)	v	Surrey Stars; 106/3 (11.2 overs)
Georgia Elwiss 26 (21); Marizanne Kapp 1/4 (3 overs)		Lizelle Lee 48 (28); Georgia Elwiss 2/20 (2.2 overs)

Surrey Stars won by 7 wickets
Woodbridge Road, Guildford
Umpires: James Middlebrook and Rob White
Player of the match: Lizelle Lee (Surrey Stars)

- Surrey Stars won the toss and elected to field.
- Match reduced to 13 overs per side due to rain.
- Points: Surrey Stars 4, Loughborough Lightning 0

11 August 2018
14:30
Scorecard

Lancashire Thunder; 136/7 (20 overs)	v	Loughborough Lightning; 137/1 (14.3 overs)
Amy Satterthwaite 47 (41); Sophie Devine 2/22 (4 overs)		Rachael Haynes 40* (37); Alex Hartley 0/16 (2 overs)

Loughborough Lightning won by 9 wickets
Haslegrave Ground, Loughborough
Umpires: Mark Newell and Ian Ramage

- Lancashire Thunder won the toss and elected to bat.
- Points: Loughborough Lightning 5, Lancashire Thunder 0

15 August 2018
14:30
Scorecard

Western Storm; 124/6 (20 overs)	v	Loughborough Lightning; 125/1 (12.3 overs)
Smriti Mandhana 29 (27); Kirstie Gordon 3/19 (4 overs)		Rachael Haynes 66* (40); Heather Knight 1/24 (2 overs)

Loughborough Lightning won by 9 wickets
Edgbaston, Birmingham
Umpires: Nick Cook and Graham Lloyd
Player of the match: Rachael Haynes (Loughborough Lightning)

- Loughborough Lightning won the toss and elected to field.
- Points: Loughborough Lightning 5, Western Storm 0

18 August 2018
14:30
Scorecard

Yorkshire Diamonds; 148/6 (20 overs)	v	Loughborough Lightning; 145/6 (20 overs)
Beth Mooney 76 (50); Linsey Smith 2/18 (4 overs)		Rachael Haynes 47 (38); Alice Davidson-Richards 2/17 (3 overs)

Yorkshire Diamonds won by 3 runs
Headingley, Leeds
Umpires: James Middlebrook and Tom Lungley

- Yorkshire Diamonds won the toss and elected to bat.
- Points: Yorkshire Diamonds 4, Loughborough Lightning 0

=== Final ===
27 August 2018
16:00
Scorecard

Surrey Stars; 183/6 (20 overs)	v	Loughborough Lightning; 117 (18.3 overs)
Lizelle Lee 104 (58); Georgia Elwiss 2/29 (4 overs)		Jenny Gunn 23* (21); Mady Villiers 3/22 (4 overs)

Surrey Stars won by 66 runs
County Cricket Ground, Hove
Umpires: Neil Bainton and Sue Redfern
Player of the match: Lizelle Lee (Surrey Stars)

- Loughborough Lightning won the toss and elected to field.

== Statistics ==
=== Batting ===
Player	Matches	Innings	NO	Runs	HS	Average	Strike rate	100s	50s	4s	6s
Georgia Adams	11	7	3	69	22*	17.25	93.24	0	0	4	1
Sophie Devine	11	11	2	269	61*	29.88	146.99	0	1	20	19
Georgia Elwiss	10	6	1	95	26	19.00	92.23	0	0	7	0
Jo Gardner	1	–	–	–	–	–	–	–	–	–	–
Sarah Glenn	11	5	3	19	18	9.50	90.47	0	0	3	0
Kirstie Gordon	11	1	0	6	6	6.00	75.00	0	0	1	0
Jenny Gunn	11	6	3	46	23*	15.33	95.83	0	0	5	0
Rachael Haynes	11	10	3	324	66*	46.28	128.06	0	3	49	3
Lucy Higham	11	4	2	11	9*	5.50	122.22	0	0	1	0
Amy Jones	11	10	3	202	66*	28.85	119.52	0	1	24	4
Linsey Smith	11	1	0	3	3	3.00	37.50	0	0	0	0
Elyse Villani	11	7	1	175	61*	29.16	127.73	0	1	25	2
Source: ESPN Cricinfo

=== Bowling ===
Player	Matches	Innings	Overs	Maidens	Runs	Wickets	BBI	Average	Economy	Strike rate
Sophie Devine	11	11	35.5	1	259	16	3/15	16.18	7.22	13.4
Georgia Elwiss	10	10	26.2	0	194	9	2/20	21.55	7.36	17.5
Sarah Glenn	11	8	16.0	0	110	3	1/14	36.66	6.87	32.0
Kirstie Gordon	11	11	35.0	0	212	17	3/13	12.47	6.05	12.3
Jenny Gunn	11	11	33.0	1	226	14	3/10	16.14	6.84	14.1
Lucy Higham	11	5	6.0	0	41	2	1/2	20.50	6.83	18.0
Linsey Smith	11	11	39.3	0	253	11	2/15	23.00	6.40	21.5
Source: ESPN Cricinfo

=== Fielding ===
Player	Matches	Innings	Catches
Georgia Adams	11	11	8
Sophie Devine	11	11	3
Georgia Elwiss	10	10	3
Jo Gardner	1	1	0
Sarah Glenn	11	11	2
Kirstie Gordon	11	11	2
Jenny Gunn	11	11	5
Rachael Haynes	11	11	10
Lucy Higham	11	11	0
Linsey Smith	11	11	2
Elyse Villani	11	11	5
Source: ESPN Cricinfo

=== Wicket-keeping ===
Player	Matches	Innings	Catches	Stumpings
Amy Jones	11	11	2	9
Source: ESPN Cricinfo
