= 2019 Women's Cricket Super League =

- Dates: 6 August 2019 – 1 September 2019
- Administrator: England and Wales Cricket Board
- Cricket format: Twenty20
- Tournament format(s): Round robin and knock-out finals
- Champions: Western Storm (2nd title)
- Participants: 6
- Matches: 32
- Player of the series: Danni Wyatt
- Most runs: Danni Wyatt (466)
- Most wickets: Freya Davies (19)

The 2019 Women's Cricket Super League, or 2019 Kia Super League for sponsorship reasons, was the fourth and final season of the Women's Cricket Super League (WCSL), the semi-professional women's cricket competition in England and Wales. The competition, run by the England and Wales Cricket Board (ECB), consisted of six franchise teams playing in a Twenty20 format. The tournament was scheduled to be replaced by the Women's Hundred and a new regional domestic structure from the next season, although the full implementation of this was delayed due to the COVID-19 pandemic. Surrey Stars were the defending champions. Western Storm defeated Southern Vipers by 6 wickets to win the 2019 title.

== Competition format ==
Six teams competed for the T20 title from 6 August to 1 September 2019. The six teams played each other twice in a round robin format. The 2nd and 3rd team played the semi-final while the top team directly went to the final. Both semi-final and final were held on Finals Day at the County Ground, Hove. Teams received 4 points for a win and a bonus point if their run rate was 1.25 times that of their opposition.

== Teams ==
Location of WCSL teams

Team	Home ground(s)	Coach	Captain
Lancashire Thunder	Old Trafford, Manchester; Aigburth, Liverpool; Stanley Park, Blackpool; Chester Boughton Hall CC, Chester	Mark McInnes	Kate Cross
Loughborough Lightning	Haslegrave Ground, Loughborough; Trent Bridge, Nottingham	Rob Taylor	Georgia Elwiss
Southern Vipers	Rose Bowl, Southampton; County Ground, Hove; Arundel Castle, Arundel	Nicholas Denning	Tammy Beaumont
Surrey Stars	The Oval, London; Woodbridge Road, Guildford	Richard Bedbrook	Natalie Sciver
Western Storm	County Ground, Taunton; County Ground, Bristol	Trevor Griffin	Heather Knight
Yorkshire Diamonds	Headingley, Leeds; Clifton Park, York; North Marine Road Ground, Scarborough	Danielle Hazell	Lauren Winfield

== Points Table ==
Pos	Team	Pld	W	L	T	NR	BP	Pts	NRR
1	Western Storm	10	9	1	0	0	3	39	1.109
2	Loughborough Lightning	10	7	3	0	0	4	32	0.792
3	Southern Vipers	10	4	4	1	1	2	22	0.425
4	Yorkshire Diamonds	10	5	5	0	0	0	20	−0.456
5	Surrey Stars	10	3	6	0	1	2	16	−0.857
6	Lancashire Thunder	10	0	9	1	0	0	2	−1.194

advanced to Final advanced to the Semi-final

- Win with bonus point: 5 points
- Win without bonus point: 4 points
- No Result/Tied: 2 points each
- Loss: 0 points

== Fixtures ==
=== League stage ===
6 August 2019
14:30
Scorecard

Southern Vipers; 166/7 (20 overs)	v	Lancashire Thunder; 132 (19.4 overs)
Danni Wyatt 54 (39); Alex Hartley 2/34 (4 overs)		Georgie Boyce 43 (41); Tash Farrant 3/18 (4 overs)

Southern Vipers won by 34 runs
Aigburth Cricket Ground, Liverpool
Umpires: Sue Redfern and Neil Pratt
Player of the match: Danni Wyatt (Southern Vipers)

- Southern Vipers won the toss and elected to bat.
- Points: Southern Vipers 5, Lancashire Thunder 0

6 August 2019
16:00
Scorecard

Loughborough Lightning; 125/6 (20 overs)	v	Western Storm; 126/3 (17 overs)
Amy Jones 65 (53); Freya Davies 2/24 (4 overs)		Heather Knight 41 (39); Sarah Glenn 2/13 (3 overs)

Western Storm won by 7 wickets
Haslegrave Ground, Loughborough
Umpires: Mark Newell and Rob White
Player of the match: Heather Knight (Western Storm)

- Loughborough Lightning won the toss and elected to bat.
- Points: Western Storm 4, Loughborough Lightning 0

6 August 2019
19:00
Scorecard

Surrey Stars; 130/9 (20 overs)	v	Yorkshire Diamonds; 121 (19.5 overs)
Sarah Taylor 43 (34); Helen Fenby 4/20 (4 overs)		Alyssa Healy 31 (17); Laura Marsh 3/17 (4 overs)

Surrey Stars won by 9 runs
Headingley, Leeds
Umpires: Jeff Evans and Nick Cook
Player of the match: Laura Marsh (Surrey Stars)

- Surrey Stars won the toss and elected to bat.
- Points: Surrey Stars 4, Yorkshire Diamonds 0

8 August 2019
14:30
Scorecard

Lancashire Thunder; 120/7 (20 overs)	v	Surrey Stars; 124/2 (14.2 overs)
Harmanpreet Kaur 58* (47); Dane van Niekerk 3/20 (4 overs)		Lizelle Lee 66 (45); Emma Lamb 1/16 (2 overs)

Surrey Stars won by 8 wickets
Woodbridge Road, Guildford
Umpires: Mark Newell and Rob White
Player of the match: Lizelle Lee (Surrey Stars)

- Surrey Stars won the toss and elected to field.
- Points: Surrey Stars 5, Lancashire Thunder 0

8 August 2019
16:00
Scorecard

Loughborough Lightning; 135/5 (20 overs)	v	Southern Vipers; 136/8 (19.3 overs)
Georgia Elwiss 37 (31); Paige Scholfield 1/12 (2 overs)		Danni Wyatt 40 (33); Kirstie Gordon 2/24 (4 overs)

Southern Vipers won by 2 wickets
Haslegrave Ground, Loughborough
Umpires: James Middlebrook and Sue Redfern
Player of the match: Stafanie Taylor (Southern Vipers)

- Loughborough Lightning won the toss and elected to bat.
- Points: Southern Vipers 4, Loughborough Lightning 0

10 August 2019
15:00
Scorecard

Lancashire Thunder; 141/6 (20 overs)	v	Western Storm; 143/4 (19.3 overs)
Suné Luus 62 (48); Claire Nicholas 2/25 (4 overs)		Fran Wilson 54 (35); Sophie Ecclestone 1/19 (4 overs)

Western Storm won by 6 wickets
County Ground, Taunton
Umpires: Jeff Evans and Alex Wharf
Player of the match: Fran Wilson (Western Storm)

- Lancashire Thunder won the toss and elected to bat.
- Points: Western Storm 4, Lancashire Thunder 0

11 August 2019
11:00
Scorecard

Yorkshire Diamonds; 121/6 (20 overs)	v	Loughborough Lightning; 122/1 (13.2 overs)
Alice Davidson-Richards 27 (23); Kirstie Gordon 2/27 (4 overs)		Hayley Matthews 54* (39); Linsey Smith 1/7 (2 overs)

Loughborough Lightning won by 9 wickets
Headingley, Leeds
Umpires: Sue Redfern and Rob White
Player of the match: Hayley Matthews (Loughborough Lightning)

- Loughborough Lightning won the toss and elected to field.
- Points: Loughborough Lightning 5, Yorkshire Diamonds 0

11 August 2019
14:30
Scorecard

Southern Vipers; 142/5 (20 overs)	v	Western Storm; 143/7 (19.5 overs)
Stafanie Taylor 44* (28); Claire Nicholas 2/29 (4 overs)		Fran Wilson 40 (30); Natasha Farrant 3/23 (4 overs)

Western Storm won by 3 wickets
Rose Bowl, Southampton
Umpires: James Middlebrook and Chris Watts
Player of the match: Fran Wilson (Western Storm)

- Southern Vipers won the toss and elected to bat.
- Points: Western Storm 4, Southern Vipers 0.

12 August 2019
18:30
Scorecard

Surrey Stars	v	Southern Vipers

Match Abandoned
The Oval, London
Umpires: Peter Hartley and Jeremy Lloyds

- No toss.
- No play possible due to rain.
- Points: Surrey Stars 2, Southern Vipers 2

13 August 2019
14:30
Scorecard

Yorkshire Diamonds; 151/6 (20 overs)	v	Lancashire Thunder; 142 (19.1 overs)
Lauren Winfield 56 (45); Kate Cross 2/31 (4 overs)		Harmanpreet Kaur 37 (37); Katie George 2/16 (2 overs)

Yorkshire Diamonds won by 9 runs
Aigburth Cricket Ground, Liverpool
Umpires: Tom Lungley and Ian Ramage
Player of the match: Lauren Winfield (Yorkshire Diamonds)

- Yorkshire Diamonds won the toss and elected to bat.
- Points: Yorkshire Diamonds 4, Lancashire Thunder 0

13 August 2019
14:30
Scorecard

Western Storm; 158/4 (20 overs)	v	Loughborough Lightning; 118 (18.2 overs)
Rachel Priest 55 (43); Georgia Elwiss 1/21 (3 overs)		Mignon du Preez 30 (24); Freya Davies 4/27 (4 overs)

Western Storm won by 40 runs
County Ground, Bristol
Umpires: Martin Saggers and David Millns
Player of the match: Freya Davies (Western Storm)

- Loughborough Lightning won the toss and elected to field.
- Points: Western Storm 5, Loughborough Lightning 0

15 August 2019
14:30
Scorecard

Surrey Stars; 120/7 (20 overs)	v	Loughborough Lightning; 123/3 (14.5 overs)
Lizelle Lee 25 (21); Hayley Matthews 2/12 (4 overs)		Mignon du Preez 70* (41); Dane van Niekerk 1/16 (3 overs)

Loughborough Lightning won by 7 wickets
Woodbridge Road, Guildford
Umpires: Hassan Adnan and Chris Watts
Player of the match: Mignon du Preez (Loughborough Lightning)

- Loughborough Lightning won the toss and elected to field.
- Points: Loughborough Lightning 5, Surrey Stars 0

15 August 2019
14:30
Scorecard

Yorkshire Diamonds; 151/9 (20 overs)	v	Western Storm; 152/1 (14.5 overs)
Hollie Armitage 59 (56); Anya Shrubsole 1/16 (4 overs)		Rachel Priest 72* (43); Alice Davidson-Richards 1/27 (3 overs)

Western Storm won by 9 wickets
Clifton Park Ground, York
Umpires: Tom Lungley and Sue Redfern
Player of the match: Rachel Priest (Western Storm)

- Western Storm won the toss and elected to field.
- Points: Western Storm 5, Yorkshire Diamonds 0

15 August 2019
19:00
Scorecard

Lancashire Thunder; 132/7 (20 overs)	v	Southern Vipers; 132/8 (20 overs)
Harmanpreet Kaur 34 (33); Amanda-Jade Wellington 3/22 (4 overs)		Stafanie Taylor 51 (43); Emma Lamb 3/33 (4 overs)

Match Tied
County Ground, Hove
Umpires: Mark Newell and Mary Waldron
Player of the match: Stafanie Taylor (Southern Vipers)

- Lancashire Thunder won the toss and elected to bat.
- Points: Southern Vipers 2, Lancashire Thunder 2

18 August 2019
14:30
Scorecard

Lancashire Thunder; 159/8 (20 overs)	v	Western Storm; 160/5 (19.5 overs)
Harmanpreet Kaur 50 (37); Anya Shrubsole 3/36 (4 overs)		Smriti Mandhana 72 (43); Sophie Ecclestone 2/32 (4 overs)

Western Storm won by 5 wickets
Chester Boughton Hall CC, Chester
Umpires: Hassan Adnan and Sue Redfern
Player of the match: Smriti Mandhana (Western Storm)

- Lancashire Thunder won the toss and elected to bat.
- Points: Western Storm 4, Lancashire Thunder 0

18 August 2019
14:30
Scorecard

Yorkshire Diamonds; 129 (20 overs)	v	Loughborough Lightning; 135/4 (19.1 overs)
Jemimah Rodrigues 58 (40); Hayley Matthews 2/19 (4 overs)		Mignon du Preez 38* (22); Beth Langston 1/17 (4 overs)

Loughborough Lightning won by 6 wickets
Haslegrave Ground, Loughborough
Umpires: Neil Pratt and Ian Ramage
Player of the match: Mignon du Preez (Loughborough Lightning)

- Yorkshire Diamonds won the toss and elected to bat.
- Points: Loughborough Lightning 4, Yorkshire Diamonds 0

18 August 2019
14:30
Scorecard

Southern Vipers; 178/5 (20 overs)	v	Surrey Stars; 89 (16.4 overs)
Danni Wyatt 110 (60); Dane van Niekerk 3/31 (4 overs)		Sarah Taylor 19 (20); Stafanie Taylor 3/11 (3 overs)

Southern Vipers won by 89 runs
Arundel Castle Cricket Ground, Arundel
Umpires: Rob White and Mary Waldron
Player of the match: Danni Wyatt (Southern Vipers)

- Surrey Stars won the toss and elected to field.
- Points: Southern Vipers 5, Surrey Stars 0

20 August 2019
14:30
Scorecard

Surrey Stars; 121/6 (20 overs)	v	Yorkshire Diamonds; 124/5 (19.5 overs)
Marizanne Kapp 39* (39); Katie Levick 2/13 (4 overs)		Jemimah Rodrigues 42* (33); Laura Marsh 2/15 (2.5 overs)

Yorkshire Diamonds won by 5 wickets
Woodbridge Road, Guildford
Umpires: Hassan Adnan and Mary Waldron
Player of the match: Jemimah Rodrigues (Yorkshire Diamonds)

- Yorkshire Diamonds won the toss and elected to field.
- Points: Yorkshire Diamonds 4, Surrey Stars 0

20 August 2019
14:30
Scorecard

Western Storm; 170/3 (20 overs)	v	Southern Vipers; 155/9 (20 overs)
Heather Knight 61 (48); Stafanie Taylor 1/20 (4 overs)		Danni Wyatt 56 (32); Freya Davies 4/18 (4 overs)

Western Storm won by 15 runs
County Ground, Bristol
Umpires: Ian Ramage and Sue Redfern
Player of the match: Freya Davies (Western Storm)

- Western Storm won the toss and elected to bat.
- Points: Western Storm 4, Southern Vipers 0

20 August 2019
18:30
Scorecard

Loughborough Lightning; 157/7 (20 overs)	v	Lancashire Thunder; 74/6 (13.4 overs)
Georgia Adams 50 (33); Sophie Ecclestone 3/17 (4 overs)		Suné Luus 30 (33); Kirstie Gordon 3/18 (3.4 overs)

Loughborough Lightning won by 35 runs (DLS)
Old Trafford, Manchester
Umpires: Tim Robinson and Nick Cook
Player of the match: Georgia Adams (Loughborough Lightning)

- Lancashire Thunder won the toss and elected to field.
- Points: Loughborough Lightning 5, Lancashire Thunder 0

21 August 2019
15:00
Scorecard

Western Storm; 159/8 (20 overs)	v	Surrey Stars; 155/8 (20 overs)
Rachel Priest 44 (16); Marizanne Kapp 1/8 (3 overs)		Sarah Taylor 73 (54); Deepti Sharma 3/18 (4 overs)

Western Storm won by 4 runs
County Ground, Taunton
Umpires: Neil Pratt and Ian Ramage
Player of the match: Sarah Taylor (Surrey Stars)

- Surrey Stars won the toss and elected to field.
- Points: Western Storm 4, Surrey Stars 0

21 August 2019
18:30
Scorecard

Southern Vipers; 127/9 (20 overs)	v	Yorkshire Diamonds; 124/5 (20 overs)
Danni Wyatt 59 (30); Leigh Kasperek 4/16 (4 overs)		Hollie Armitage 34 (38); Suzie Bates 2/27 (4 overs)

Southern Vipers won by 3 runs
Rose Bowl, Southampton
Umpires: Neil Bainton and Alex Wharf
Player of the match: Danni Wyatt (Southern Vipers)

- Southern Vipers won the toss and elected to bat.
- Points: Southern Vipers 4, Yorkshire Diamonds 0

23 August 2019
14:30
Scorecard

Lancashire Thunder; 164/5 (20 overs)	v	Yorkshire Diamonds; 168/6 (18.5 overs)
Eleanor Threlkeld 52 (37); Katie Levick 2/19 (4 overs)		Alyssa Healy 77 (38); Sophie Ecclestone 2/18 (4 overs)

Yorkshire Diamonds won by 4 wickets
North Marine Road Ground, Scarborough
Umpires: James Middlebrook and Chris Watts
Player of the match: Alyssa Healy (Yorkshire Diamonds)

- Lancashire Thunder won the toss and elected to bat.
- Points: Yorkshire Diamonds 4, Lancashire Thunder 0

23 August 2019
16:00
Scorecard

Surrey Stars; 147/7 (20 overs)	v	Loughborough Lightning; 150/5 (18.3 overs)
Nat Sciver 53 (35); Jenny Gunn 2/19 (4 overs)		Mignon du Preez 48 (25); Mady Villiers 1/6 (3 overs)

Loughborough Lightning won by 5 wickets
Haslegrave Ground, Loughborough
Umpires: Neil Pratt and Mary Waldron
Player of the match: Mignon du Preez (Loughborough Lightning)

- Surrey Stars won the toss and elected to bat.
- Loughborough Lightning 4, Surrey Stars 0

25 August 2019
11:30
Scorecard

Lancashire Thunder; 122 (19.5 overs)	v	Loughborough Lightning; 123/2 (16.1 overs)
Sophia Dunkley 29 (21); Jenny Gunn 3/14 (3.5 overs)		Amy Jones 66 (52); Alex Hartley 1/21 (3.1 overs)

Loughborough Lightning won by 8 wickets
Trent Bridge, Nottingham
Umpires: Graham Lloyd and Jeremy Lloyds
Player of the match: Amy Jones (Loughborough Lightning)

- Lancashire Thunder won the toss and elected to bat.
- Points: Loughborough Lightning 4, Lancashire Thunder 0

25 August 2019
14:30
Scorecard

Southern Vipers; 184/4 (20 overs)	v	Yorkshire Diamonds; 185/6 (20 overs)
Suzie Bates 47 (39); Alice Davidson-Richards 3/21 (4 overs)		Jemimah Rodrigues 112* (58); Tash Farrant 2/27 (4 overs)

Yorkshire Diamonds won by 4 wickets
Clifton Park Ground, York
Umpires: Hassan Adnan and James Middlebrook
Player of the match: Jemimah Rodrigues (Yorkshire Diamonds)

- Yorkshire Diamonds won the toss and elected to field.
- Points: Yorkshire Diamonds 4, Southern Vipers 0

25 August 2019
14:30
Scorecard

Western Storm; 171/4 (20 overs)	v	Surrey Stars; 94 (17.5 overs)
Rachel Priest 89 (55); Dane van Niekerk 2/34 (4 overs)		Sarah Taylor 34 (29); Sonia Odedra 4/25 (3 overs)

Western Storm won by 77 runs
Woodbridge Road, Guildford
Umpires: Tom Lungley and Sue Redfern
Player of the match: Rachel Priest (Western Storm)

- Surrey Stars won the toss and elected to field.
- Points: Western Storm 5, Surrey Stars 0

28 August 2019
14:30
Scorecard

Surrey Stars; 132/1 (9 overs)	v	Lancashire Thunder; 97/7 (9 overs)
Lizelle Lee 75 (28); Kate Cross 1/42 (2 overs)		Tahlia McGrath 41 (18); Hannah Jones 3/24 (2 overs)

Surrey Stars won by 35 runs
Stanley Park, Blackpool
Umpires: Sue Redfern and Paul Baldwin
Player of the match: Lizelle Lee (Surrey Stars)

- Lancashire Thunder won the toss and elected to field.
- Match reduced to 9 overs per side due to rain.
- Points: Surrey Stars 5, Lancashire Thunder 0

28 August 2019
18:30
Scorecard

Yorkshire Diamonds; 104/4 (10 overs)	v	Western Storm; 99/3 (10 overs)
Jemimah Rodrigues 60 (27); Freya Davies 3/7 (2 overs)		Fran Wilson 45 (20); Linsey Smith 1/14 (2 overs)

Yorkshire Diamonds won by 5 runs
County Ground, Taunton, Taunton
Umpires: Mark Newell and Tom Lungley
Player of the match: Jemimah Rodrigues (Yorkshire Diamonds)

- Western Storm won the toss and elected to field.
- Match reduced to 10 overs per side due to rain.
- Points: Yorkshire Diamonds 4, Western Storm 0

28 August 2019
18:30
Scorecard

Loughborough Lightning; 163/4 (20 overs)	v	Southern Vipers; 127 (19 overs)
Amy Jones 74 (53); Amanda-Jade Wellington 2/22 (4 overs)		Fi Morris 36 (31); Chamari Atapattu 3/18 (4 overs)

Loughborough Lightning won by 36 runs
Rose Bowl, Southampton
Umpires: James Middlebrook and Rob White
Player of the match: Amy Jones (Loughborough Lightning)

- Southern Vipers won the toss and elected to field.
- Points: Loughborough Lightning 5, Southern Vipers 0

=== Semi-final ===
1 September 2019
12:00
Scorecard

Loughborough Lightning; 143 (19.5 overs)	v	Southern Vipers; 145/5 (19 overs)
Georgia Elwiss 28 (22); Suzie Bates 3/22 (2.5 overs)		Suzie Bates 37 (25); Georgia Elwiss 1/21 (4 overs)

Southern Vipers won by 5 wickets
County Ground, Hove
Umpires: Mark Newell and Rob White
Player of the match: Suzie Bates (Southern Vipers)

- Loughborough Lightning won the toss and elected to bat.

=== Final ===
1 September 2019
16:00
Scorecard

Southern Vipers; 172/7 (20 overs)	v	Western Storm; 174/4 (19 overs)
Danni Wyatt 73 (42); Anya Shrubsole 2/26 (4 overs)		Heather Knight 78* (53); Amanda-Jade Wellington 2/31 (4 overs)

Western Storm won by 6 wickets
County Ground, Hove
Umpires: Mark Newell and Rob White
Player of the match: Heather Knight (Western Storm)

- Southern Vipers won the toss and elected to bat.

== Statistics ==
- Highest score by a team: Yorkshire Diamonds − 185/6 (20 overs) v Southern Vipers (25 August).
- Lowest score by a team: Surrey Stars − 89 (16.4 overs) v Southern Vipers (18 August).
- Top score by an individual: Jemimah Rodrigues − 112* (58) v Southern Vipers (25 August).
- Best bowling figures by an individual: Leigh Kasperek − 4/16 (4 overs) v Southern Vipers (21 August).

=== Most runs ===
Player	Team	Matches	Innings	Runs	Average	HS	100s	50s
Danni Wyatt	Southern Vipers	11	11	466	42.36	110	1	4
Jemimah Rodrigues	Yorkshire Diamonds	10	10	401	57.28	112*	1	2
Heather Knight	Western Storm	11	11	392	49.00	78*	0	4
Rachel Priest	Western Storm	11	11	365	36.50	89	0	3
Amy Jones	Loughborough Lightning	11	11	309	34.33	74*	0	3

Source: ESPNCricinfo

=== Most wickets ===
Player	Team	Overs	Wickets	Average	BBI	5w
Freya Davies	Western Storm	39.0	19	13.21	4/18	0
Amanda-Jade Wellington	Southern Vipers	41.0	15	18.73	3/22	0
Tash Farrant	Southern Vipers	33.4	14	15.92	3/18	0
Anya Shrubsole	Western Storm	32.0	13	19.53	3/36	0
Dane van Niekerk	Surrey Stars	30.2	12	17.58	3/20	0

Source: ESPNCricinfo
