= 2018 Women's Cricket Super League =

- Dates: 22 July 2018 – 27 August 2018
- Administrator: England and Wales Cricket Board
- Cricket format: Twenty20
- Tournament format(s): Round robin and knock-out finals
- Champions: Surrey Stars (1st title)
- Participants: 6
- Matches: 32
- Player of the series: Smriti Mandhana
- Most runs: Smriti Mandhana (421)
- Most wickets: Kirstie Gordon (17)

The 2018 Women's Cricket Super League, or 2018 Kia Super League for sponsorship reasons, was the third season of the Women's Cricket Super League (WCSL), the semi-professional women's cricket competition in England and Wales. The competition, run by the England and Wales Cricket Board (ECB), consisted of six franchise teams playing in a Twenty20 format. Western Storm were the defending champions.

Surrey Stars won the competition, defeating Loughborough Lightning by 66 runs in the final. Smriti Mandhana, an Indian player for Western Storm, was named player of the tournament, after she finished as the tournament's top run-scorer.

== Competition format ==
Six teams competed for the T20 title which took place between 22 July and 27 August 2018. The six teams played each other twice in a round robin format, with the top three teams progressing to a Finals Day at the County Ground, Hove.

== Teams ==
Location of WCSL teams

Team	Home ground(s)	Coach	Captain
Lancashire Thunder	Old Trafford, Manchester; Trafalgar Road Ground, Southport; Aigburth Cricket Ground, Liverpool; Stanley Park, Blackpool	Alex Blackwell	Danielle Hazell
Loughborough Lightning	Haslegrave Ground, Loughborough; Edgbaston, Birmingham	Rob Taylor	Georgia Elwiss
Southern Vipers	Rose Bowl, Southampton; Arundel Castle Cricket Ground, Arundel	Nicholas Denning	Suzie Bates
Surrey Stars	The Oval, London; Woodbridge Road, Guildford	Richard Bedbrook	Natalie Sciver
Western Storm	County Ground, Taunton; College Ground, Cheltenham; County Ground, Bristol	Trevor Griffin	Heather Knight
Yorkshire Diamonds	Headingley, Leeds; Clifton Park, York; North Marine Road Ground, Scarborough	Paul Grayson	Lauren Winfield

Last updated: 17 July 2018

== Points Table ==
Pos	Team	Pld	W	L	T	NR	BP	Pts	NRR
1	Loughborough Lightning	10	7	3	0	0	5	33	1.361
2	Western Storm	10	6	3	0	1	4	30	0.919
3	Surrey Stars	10	5	4	0	1	2	24	−0.404
4	Lancashire Thunder	10	5	5	0	0	1	21	−0.825
5	Yorkshire Diamonds	10	3	6	0	1	1	15	−0.290
6	Southern Vipers	10	2	7	0	1	0	10	−0.490

- The three top ranked teams qualified for the Knockouts.
- advanced to Final
- advanced to the Semi-final

== Fixtures ==
=== League stage ===
22 July 2018
14:30
Scorecard

Surrey Stars; 141/9 (20 overs)	v	Southern Vipers; 145/3 (17 overs)
Sophia Dunkley 66 (43); Fi Morris 4/22 (4 overs)		Tammy Beaumont 62* (45); Marizanne Kapp 2/21 (4 overs)

Southern Vipers won by 7 wickets
Woodbridge Road, Guildford
Umpires: Sue Redfern and Mark Newell

- Southern Vipers won the toss and elected to field.
- Points: Southern Vipers 4, Surrey Stars 0

22 July 2018
14:30
Scorecard

Lancashire Thunder; 72 (16.5 overs)	v	Loughborough Lightning; 74/4 (15.1 overs)
Evelyn Jones 19 (20); Jenny Gunn 3/10 (3 overs)		Georgia Adams 22 (19); Alex Hartley 2/12 (4 overs)

Loughborough Lightning won by 6 wickets
Trafalgar Road Ground, Southport
Umpires: Rob White and Ian Ramage

- Loughborough Lightning won the toss and elected to field.
- Points: Loughborough Lightning 5, Lancashire Thunder 0

22 July 2018
14:30
Scorecard

Yorkshire Diamonds; 162/5 (20 overs)	v	Western Storm; 166/3 (15.3 overs)
Delissa Kimmince 55*(41); Freya Davies 2/28 (4 overs)		Heather Knight 97 (62); Alice Davidson-Richards 2/31 (3.3 overs)

Western Storm won by 7 wickets
County Ground, Taunton
Umpires: Tim Robinson and Martin Saggers

- Western Storm won the toss and elected to field.
- Points: Western Storm 5, Yorkshire Diamonds 0

25 July 2018
14:30
Scorecard

Southern Vipers; 105 (19.3 overs)	v	Loughborough Lightning; 109/4 (18.5 overs)
Tammy Beaumont 37 (39); Sophie Devine 3/21 (4 overs)		Elyse Villani 35 (33); Amelia Kerr 1/6 (4 overs)

Loughborough Lightning won by 6 wickets
Rose Bowl, Southampton
Umpires: Steve O'Shaughnessy and Neil Mallender

- Loughborough Lightning won the toss and elected to field.
- Points: Loughborough Lightning 4, Southern Vipers 0

26 July 2018
14:30
Scorecard

Western Storm; 132/9 (20 overs)	v	Surrey Stars; 136/3 (15.5 overs)
Smriti Mandhana 37 (21); Sophia Dunkley 3/18 (2 overs)		Sarah Taylor 50 (34); Danielle Gibson 2/34 (4 overs)

Surrey Stars won by 7 wickets
College Ground, Cheltenham
Umpires: Sue Redfern and Mark Newell

- Surrey Stars won the toss and elected to field.
- Points: Surrey Stars 5, Western Storm 0

27 July 2018
14:30
Scorecard

Lancashire Thunder; 134/4 (20 overs)	v	Yorkshire Diamonds; 101 (18.2 overs)
Amy Satterthwaite 57* (34); Alice Davidson-Richards 2/15 (3 overs)		Lauren Winfield 28 (23); Sophie Ecclestone 3/11 (3.2 overs)

Lancashire Thunder won by 33 runs
Headingley, Leeds
Umpires: Mike Burns and Rob Bailey
Player of the match: Eleanor Threlkeld (Lancashire Thunder)

- Yorkshire Diamonds won the toss and elected to field.
- Points: Lancashire Thunder 5, Yorkshire Diamonds 0

29 July 2018
10:30
Scorecard

Western Storm; 85/2 (6 overs)	v	Loughborough Lightning; 67/0 (6 overs)
Smriti Mandhana 52* (19); Georgia Elwiss 1/17 (1 over)		Sophie Devine 46* (21)

Western Storm won by 18 runs
County Ground, Taunton
Umpires: Mike Burns and Ian Gould
Player of the match: Smriti Mandhana (Western Storm)

- Loughborough Lightning won the toss and elected to field.
- Match reduced to 6 over per side due to rain.
- Points: Western Storm 5, Loughborough Lightning 0

29 July 2018
14:30
Scorecard

Surrey Stars	v	Yorkshire Diamonds

Match Abandoned
Woodbridge Road, Guildford
Umpires: Mark Newell and Tom Lungley

- No toss
- No play possible due to rain.
- Points: Surrey Stars 2, Yorkshire Diamonds 2

29 July 2018
14:30
Scorecard

Lancashire Thunder; 137/6 (20 overs)	v	Southern Vipers; 133/9 (20 overs)
Evelyn Jones 69 (65); Tash Farrant 3/24 (4 overs)		Suzie Bates 40 (36); Emma Lamb 4/17 (4 overs)

Lancashire Thunder won by 4 runs
Aigburth Cricket Ground, Liverpool
Umpires: Sue Redfern and James Middlebrook

- Southern Vipers won the toss and elected to field.
- Points: Lancashire Thunder 4, Southern Vipers 0

31 July 2018
14:30
Scorecard

Southern Vipers; 91 (18.1 overs)	v	Western Storm; 93/1 (9.3 overs)
Sara McGlashan 31 (30); Claire Nicholas 2/17 (4 overs)		Smriti Mandhana 43* (27); Arran Brindle 1/13 (2 overs)

Western Storm won by 9 wickets
Arundel Castle Cricket Ground, Arundel
Umpires: Chris Watts and Rob White
Player of the match: Smriti Mandhana (Western Storm)

- Western Storm won the toss and elected to field.
- Points: Western Storm 5, Southern Vipers 0

31 July 2018
14:30
Scorecard

Surrey Stars; 148/5 (20 overs)	v	Lancashire Thunder; 151/5 (19.5 overs)
Nat Sciver 95 (57); Emma Lamb 3/34 (4 overs)		Nicole Bolton 87 (61); Nat Sciver 2/26 (4 overs)

Lancashire Thunder won by 5 wickets
The Oval, London
Umpires: Graham Lloyd and Nick Cook

- Lancashire Thunder won the toss and elected to field.
- Points: Lancashire Thunder 4, Surrey Stars 0

31 July 2018
14:30
Scorecard

Loughborough Lightning; 143/6 (20 overs)	v	Yorkshire Diamonds; 102/9 (20 overs)
Rachael Haynes 50 (41); Katie Levick 2/24 (4 overs)		Thea Brookes 30 (19); Kirstie Gordon 2/10 (3 overs)

Loughborough Lightning won by 41 runs
Haslegrave Ground, Loughborough
Umpires: Tom Lungley and Sue Redfern

- Loughborough Lightning won the toss and elected to bat.
- Points: Loughborough Lightning 5, Yorkshire Diamonds 0

2 August 2018
14:30
Scorecard

Surrey Stars; 95 (18 overs)	v	Loughborough Lightning; 96/1 (10 overs)
Nat Sciver 45 (35); Kirstie Gordon 3/13 (4 overs)		Sophie Devine 61* (32); Marizanne Kapp 1/17 (4 overs)

Loughborough Lightning won by 9 wickets
Haslegrave Ground, Loughborough
Umpires: Chris Watts and Rob White

- Surrey Stars won the toss and elected to bat.
- Points: Loughborough Lightning 5, Surrey Stars 0

2 August 2018
14:30
Scorecard

Yorkshire Diamonds; 175/5 (20 overs)	v	Southern Vipers; 163/9 (20 overs)
Lauren Winfield 64 (38); Amelia Kerr 2/27 (4 overs)		Suzie Bates 34 (22); Katherine Brunt 5/26 (4 overs)

Yorkshire Diamonds won by 12 runs
Clifton Park, York
Umpires: Tom Lungley and Sue Redfern

- Yorkshire Diamonds won the toss and elected to bat.
- Points: Yorkshire Diamonds 4, Southern Vipers 0

3 August 2018
14:30
Scorecard

Lancashire Thunder; 153/7 (20 overs)	v	Western Storm; 154/3 (18.2 overs)
Amy Satterthwaite 85* (57); Anya Shrubsole 2/36 (4 overs)		Smriti Mandhana 102 (61); Amy Satterthwaite 1/7 (1.2 overs)

Western Storm won by 7 wickets
Old Trafford, Manchester
Umpires: Paul Baldwin and Sue Redfern

- Western Storm won the toss and elected to field.
- Points: Western Storm 4, Lancashire Thunder 0

4 August 2018
14:30
Scorecard

Southern Vipers; 172/6 (20 overs)	v	Loughborough Lightning; 174/7 (19.4 overs)
Sara McGlashan 55* (28); Georgia Elwiss 2/46 (4 overs)		Elyse Villani 61* (38); Danni Wyatt 1/4 (1 over)

Loughborough Lightning won by 3 wickets
Haslegrave Ground, Loughborough
Umpires: Sue Redfern and Ian Ramage
Player of the match: Elyse Villani (Loughborough Lightning)

- Southern Vipers won the toss and elected to bat.
- Points: Loughborough Lightning 4, Southern Vipers 0

5 August 2018
14:30
Scorecard

Yorkshire Diamonds; 172/5 (20 overs)	v	Western Storm; 174/3 (19.2 overs)
Beth Mooney 69 (42); Heather Knight 1/27 (4 overs)		Smriti Mandhana 56 (36); Katie Levick 1/16 (3 overs)

Western Storm won by 7 wickets
North Marine Road Ground, Scarborough
Umpires: James Middlebrook and Chris Watts

- Yorkshire Diamonds won the toss and elected to bat.
- Points: Western Storm 4, Yorkshire Diamonds 0

7 August 2018
14:30
Scorecard

Surrey Stars; 167/8 (20 overs)	v	Lancashire Thunder; 112 (19.2 overs)
Lizelle Lee 70 (37); Emma Lamb 2/12 (3 overs)		Evelyn Jones 40 (48); Dane van Niekerk 3/20 (4 overs)

Surrey Stars won by 55 runs
Old Trafford, Manchester
Umpires: Mike Burns and Jeff Evans
Player of the match: Lizelle Lee (Surrey Stars)

- Lancashire Thunder won the toss and elected to field.
- Points: Surrey Stars 5, Lancashire Thunder 0

8 August 2018
14:30
Scorecard

Southern Vipers; 159/7 (20 overs)	v	Yorkshire Diamonds; 143 (19.5 overs)
Tammy Beaumont 64 (37); Katie Levick 3/35 (4 overs)		Thea Brookes 45 (36); Suzie Bates 4/26 (3.5 overs)

Southern Vipers won by 16 runs
Rose Bowl, Southampton
Umpires: Neil Bainton and Tim Robinson
Player of the match: Tammy Beaumont (Southern Vipers)

- Yorkshire Diamonds won the toss and elected to field.
- Points: Southern Vipers 4, Yorkshire Diamonds 0

9 August 2018
14:30
Scorecard

Loughborough Lightning; 100/7 (13 overs)	v	Surrey Stars; 106/3 (11.2 overs)
Georgia Elwiss 26 (21); Marizanne Kapp 1/4 (3 overs)		Lizelle Lee 48 (28); Georgia Elwiss 2/20 (2.2 overs)

Surrey Stars won by 7 wickets
Woodbridge Road, Guildford
Umpires: James Middlebrook and Rob White
Player of the match: Lizelle Lee (Surrey Stars)

- Surrey Stars won the toss and elected to field.
- Match reduced to 13 overs per side due to rain.
- Points: Surrey Stars 4, Loughborough Lightning 0

9 August 2018
14:30
Scorecard

Western Storm; 185/4 (20 overs)	v	Lancashire Thunder; 109 (18.2 overs)
Heather Knight 76 (50); Sophie Ecclestone 2/27 (4 overs)		Eleanor Threlkeld 33 (32); Claire Nicholas 3/11 (3 overs)

Western Storm won by 76 runs
County Ground, Taunton
Umpires: Billy Taylor and Sue Redfern

- Lancashire Thunder won the toss and elected to field.
- Points: Western Storm 5, Lancashire Thunder 0

11 August 2018
14:30
Scorecard

Lancashire Thunder; 136/7 (20 overs)	v	Loughborough Lightning; 137/1 (14.3 overs)
Amy Satterthwaite 47 (41); Sophie Devine 2/22 (4 overs)		Rachael Haynes 40* (37); Alex Hartley 0/16 (2 overs)

Loughborough Lightning won by 9 wickets
Haslegrave Ground, Loughborough
Umpires: Mark Newell and Ian Ramage

- Lancashire Thunder won the toss and elected to bat.
- Points: Loughborough Lightning 5, Lancashire Thunder 0

11 August 2018
14:30
Scorecard

Southern Vipers; 62/2 (8.5 overs)	v	Western Storm
Danni Wyatt 27 (20); Danielle Gibson 1/8 (1.5 overs)

No result
County Ground, Bristol
Umpires: Rob White and Chris Watts

- Western Storm won the toss and elected to field.
- Points: Western Storm 2, Southern Vipers 2

12 August 2018
14:30
Scorecard

Surrey Stars; 66 (16.4 overs)	v	Yorkshire Diamonds; 67/1 (9.3 overs)
Marizanne Kapp 13 (14); Beth Langston 3/14 (3.4 overs)		Beth Mooney 44* (30); Laura Marsh 1/20 (3 overs)

Yorkshire Diamonds won by 9 wickets
Clifton Park, York
Umpires: Sue Redfern and James Middlebrook
Player of the match: Beth Mooney (Yorkshire Diamonds)

- Yorkshire Diamonds won the toss and elected to field.
- Points: Yorkshire Diamonds 5, Surrey Stars 0

14 August 2018
14:30
Scorecard

Southern Vipers; 147/9 (20 overs)	v	Surrey Stars; 148/6 (19.3 overs)
Suzie Bates 82 (57); Nat Sciver 4/32 (4 overs)		Nat Sciver 46 (33); Suzie Bates 2/22 (4 overs)

Surrey Stars won by 4 wickets
County Ground, Hove
Umpires: Michael Gough and Sue Redfern
Player of the match: Nat Sciver (Surrey Stars)

- Surrey Stars won the toss and elected to field.
- Points: Surrey Stars 4, Southern Vipers 0

14 August 2018
14:30
Scorecard

Lancashire Thunder; 154/9 (20 overs)	v	Yorkshire Diamonds; 145/8 (20 overs)
Harmanpreet Kaur 74 (44); Katherine Brunt 3/22 (4 overs)		Katherine Brunt 44* (25); Alex Hartley 2/27 (4 overs)

Lancashire Thunder won by 9 runs
Stanley Park, Blackpool
Umpires: James Middlebrook and Rob White
Player of the match: Harmanpreet Kaur (Lancashire Thunder)

- Yorkshire Diamonds won the toss and elected to field.
- Points: Lancashire Thunder 4, Yorkshire Diamonds 0

15 August 2018
14:30
Scorecard

Western Storm; 124/6 (20 overs)	v	Loughborough Lightning; 125/1 (12.3 overs)
Smriti Mandhana 29 (27); Kirstie Gordon 3/19 (4 overs)		Rachael Haynes 66* (40); Heather Knight 1/24 (2 overs)

Loughborough Lightning won by 9 wickets
Edgbaston, Birmingham
Umpires: Nick Cook (Eng) and Graham Lloyd (Eng)
Player of the match: Rachael Haynes (Loughborough Lightning)

- Loughborough Lightning won the toss and elected to field.
- Points: Loughborough Lightning 5, Western Storm 0

18 August 2018
14:30
Scorecard

Lancashire Thunder; 162/3 (20 overs)	v	Southern Vipers; 153 (19.4 overs)
Harmanpreet Kaur 44* (20); Paige Scholfield 1/28 (4 overs)		Danni Wyatt 36 (21); Sophie Ecclestone 4/20 (4 overs)

Lancashire Thunder won by 9 runs
Rose Bowl, Southampton
Umpires: Mark Newell and Chris Watts
Player of the match: Sophie Ecclestone (Lancashire Thunder)

- Lancashire Thunder won the toss and elected to field.
- Points: Lancashire Thunder 4, Southern Vipers 0

18 August 2018
14:30
Scorecard

Yorkshire Diamonds; 148/6 (20 overs)	v	Loughborough Lightning; 145/6 (20 overs)
Beth Mooney 76 (50); Linsey Smith 2/18 (4 overs)		Rachael Haynes 47 (38); Alice Davidson-Richards 2/17 (3 overs)

Yorkshire Diamonds won by 3 runs
Headingley, Leeds
Umpires: James Middlebrook and Tom Lungley

- Yorkshire Diamonds won the toss and elected to bat.
- Points: Yorkshire Diamonds 4, Loughborough Lightning 0

18 August 2018
14:30
Scorecard

Western Storm; 158/5 (20 overs)	v	Surrey Stars; 160/5 (19.4 overs)
Heather Knight 62 (47); Dane van Niekerk 2/20 (4 overs)		Lizelle Lee 48 (28); Heather Knight 1/18 (2 overs)

Surrey Stars won by 5 wickets
The Oval, London
Umpires: Nick Cook and Ian Gould
Player of the match: Lizelle Lee (Surrey Stars)

- Surrey Stars won the toss and elected to bat.
- Points: Surrey Stars 4, Western Storm 0

Last updated: 18 August 2018

=== Semi-final ===
27 August 2018
12:00
Scorecard

Surrey Stars; 162/5 (20 overs)	v	Western Storm; 153/6 (20 overs)
Nat Sciver 72* (43); Heather Knight 1/16 (2 overs)		Fran Wilson 58* (45); Nat Sciver 2/21 (4 overs)

Surrey Stars won by 9 runs
County Ground, Hove
Umpires: Jeremy Lloyds and Neil Bainton
Player of the match: Nat Sciver (Surrey Stars)

- Western Storm won the toss and elected to field.

=== Final ===
27 August 2018
16:00
Scorecard

Surrey Stars; 183/6 (20 overs)	v	Loughborough Lightning; 117 (18.3 overs)
Lizelle Lee 104 (58); Georgia Elwiss 2/29 (4 overs)		Jenny Gunn 23* (21); Mady Villiers 3/22 (4 overs)

Surrey Stars won by 66 runs
County Ground, Hove
Umpires: Neil Bainton and Sue Redfern
Player of the match: Lizelle Lee (Surrey Stars)

- Loughborough Lightning won the toss and elected to field.

== Statistics ==
- Highest score by a team: Western Storm – 185/4 (20 overs) v Lancashire Thunder (9 August).
- Lowest score by a team: Surrey Stars – 66 (16.4 overs) v Yorkshire Diamonds (12 August).
- Top score by an individual: Lizelle Lee – 104 (58) v Loughborough Lightning (27 August).
- Best bowling figures by an individual: Katherine Brunt – 5/26 (4 overs) v Southern Vipers (2 August).

=== Most runs ===
Player	Team	Matches	Innings	Runs	Average	HS	100s	50s
Smriti Mandhana	Western Storm	10	9	421	60.14	102	1	2
Heather Knight	Western Storm	11	10	368	46.00	97	0	3
Nat Sciver	Surrey Stars	11	11	362	45.25	95*	0	2
Lizelle Lee	Surrey Stars	11	11	352	32.00	104	1	1
Rachael Haynes	Loughborough Lightning	11	10	324	46.28	66*	0	3

Source: ESPNCricinfo

=== Most wickets ===
Player	Team	Overs	Wickets	Average	BBI	5w
Kirstie Gordon	Loughborough Lightning	35.0	17	12.47	3/13	0
Sophie Devine	Loughborough Lightning	35.5	16	16.18	3/15	0
Sophie Ecclestone	Lancashire Thunder	36.0	15	15.40	4/20	0
Jenny Gunn	Loughborough Lightning	33.0	14	16.14	3/10	0
Dane van Niekerk	Surrey Stars	29.0	13	14.76	3/20	0

Source: ESPNCricinfo
