= Abbey Freeborn =

English cricketer (born 1996)

Personal information
- Full name: Abigail Johanna Freeborn
- Born: 12 November 1996 (age 30); Eastbourne, East Sussex, England
- Batting: Right-handed
- Role: Wicket-keeper

Domestic team information
- Years: Team
- 2013–2020: Sussex
- 2019: → Yorkshire (on loan)
- 2017–2019: Loughborough Lightning
- 2020–2021: Lightning
- 2021: Leicestershire
- 2021–2022: Trent Rockets
- 2022–2024: Staffordshire
- 2022–2024: Central Sparks
- 2023: Birmingham Phoenix
- 2024–present: London Spirit

Career statistics
| Competition | WLA | WT20 |
|---|---|---|
| Matches | 85 | 108 |
| Runs scored | 1,730 | 1,278 |
| Batting average | 28.36 | 20.28 |
| 100s/50s | 1/6 | 0/4 |
| Top score | 107* | 71* |
| Catches/stumpings | 63/18 | 31/34 |
- Source: CricketArchive, 16 October 2024

Abigail Johanna Freeborn (born 12 November 1996) is an English cricketer who currently plays for Warwickshire and London Spirit. She plays as a wicket-keeper and right-handed batter. She has previously played for Sussex, Yorkshire, Leicestershire and Staffordshire, as well as Loughborough Lightning and Lightning and Central Sparks in regional cricket and Trent Rockets and Birmingham Phoenix in The Hundred.

== Early life ==
Freeborn was born on 12 November 1996 in Eastbourne, East Sussex. She attended Loughborough University.

== Domestic career ==
Freeborn made her county debut in 2013, for Sussex in a match against Surrey. She kept wicket and made one stumping, but did not bat. She soon became a regular for Sussex, and she was a part of their 2013 Women's County Championship and 2015 Women's Twenty20 Cup title victories.

Freeborn joined Yorkshire on loan for the 2019 season. She achieved her List A high score of 58 that season, off just 40 deliveries against Surrey. In 2021, it was announced that she has joined Leicestershire, but she did not play for them that season. She joined Staffordshire ahead of the 2022 season. She scored 83 runs at an average of 20.75 in six matches for the side in the 2022 Women's Twenty20 Cup.

Freeborn was also part of Loughborough Lightning's squad in the Women's Cricket Super League from 2017 to 2019. She was part of the side that reached the semi-final in 2019, and had a high score of 16* in a victory over Lancashire Thunder in 2017.

In 2020, Freeborn played for Lightning in the Rachael Heyhoe Flint Trophy. She scored 167 runs at an average of 33.40 in five matches, with a top score of 40 in a victory over Central Sparks. In December 2020, it was announced that Freeborn was one of the 41 female cricketers that had signed a full-time domestic contract. In 2021, she scored 105 runs at an average of 15.00 in the Rachael Heyhoe Flint Trophy, as well as being ever-present for the Trent Rockets in The Hundred. Her best performances came in the Charlotte Edwards Cup, where she was Lightning's leading run-scorer, with 161 runs. She made her Twenty20 high score of 61 in a match against South East Stars, as well as becoming the first wicketkeeper in the tournament to make four dismissals in an innings, all stumpings, in the same match. At the end of the season it was announced that Freeborn had moved to Central Sparks, and signed a professional contract with her new side. She scored 163 runs in the 2022 Charlotte Edwards Cup, including 52 made against Western Storm. She was also Central Sparks' leading run-scorer in the 2022 Rachael Heyhoe Flint Trophy, with 227 at an average of 45.40. She made what was at the time her List A high score against North West Thunder, scoring 72 from 72 deliveries. She also played seven matches for Trent Rockets in The Hundred, and scored 45* in her side's victory over Manchester Originals.

In 2023, she played 20 matches for Central Sparks, across the Rachael Heyhoe Flint Trophy and the Charlotte Edwards Cup, and scored her maiden List A century, with 107* against Sunrisers. She also moved to Birmingham Phoenix in The Hundred, playing seven matches and scoring 43 runs. In 2024, she played 25 matches for Central Sparks, across the Rachael Heyhoe Flint Trophy and the Charlotte Edwards Cup, scoring five half-centuries with a high score of 93.
