= Lucy Higham =

English cricketer (born 1997)

Personal information
- Full name: Lucy Florence Higham
- Born: 17 October 1997 (age 29); Leicester, Leicestershire, England
- Batting: Right-handed
- Bowling: Right-arm off break
- Role: Bowler

Domestic team information
- Years: Team
- 2013–2016: Leicestershire
- 2017–2024: Nottinghamshire
- 2017–2019: Loughborough Lightning
- 2020–present: The Blaze
- 2021: Trent Rockets
- 2022–present: Northern Superchargers

Career statistics
Competition	WLA	WT20
Matches	94	126
Runs scored	1,048	819
Batting average	14.76	15.45
100s/50s	0/3	0/1
Top score	74	53
Balls bowled	3,639	1,624
Wickets	103	76
Bowling average	23.59	21.06
5 wickets in innings	1	0
10 wickets in match	0	0
Best bowling	5/19	4/16
Catches/stumpings	33/–	29/–
- Source: CricketArchive, 19 October 2024

Lucy Florence Higham (born 17 October 1997) is an English cricketer who currently plays for The Blaze and Northern Superchargers. She plays primarily as a right-arm off break bowler. She has previously played for Leicestershire and Nottinghamshire, as well as for Loughborough Lightning in the Women's Cricket Super League and Trent Rockets in The Hundred. Higham was signed for London Spirit in the auction for The Hundred 2026.

== Early life ==
Higham was born on 17 October 1997 in Leicester. She attended Loughborough University.

== Domestic career ==
Higham made her county debut in 2013, for Leicestershire in a match against Scotland. She did not bat or bowl. She went on to take seven wickets at an average of 14.28 in her first County Championship season. She soon became one of Leicestershire's top performers, and was their leading wicket-taker in the 2014 Women's Twenty20 Cup, the 2015 Women's County Championship and the 2016 Women's County Championship. She also hit her List A high score in the 2015 Championship, scoring 74 in a victory over Northamptonshire.

In 2017, Higham joined Nottinghamshire. She was part of the side that won Division 2 of the 2017 Women's Twenty20 Cup, and her best season came in 2018, where she took 8 wickets in the County Championship and 9 wickets (including her T20 best of 4/16) in the Twenty20 Cup. In 2019, she captained Nottinghamshire in the Twenty20 Cup. She played just one match for the side in 2021. She took four wickets in the 2022 Women's Twenty20 Cup, as well as scoring her maiden Twenty20 half-century, 53 against Lancashire.

Higham was also part of Loughborough Lightning's squad in the Women's Cricket Super League from 2017 to 2019. She was part of the side that reached the final in 2018, and took 1/2 in a match that season, dismissing Chamari Atapattu of Yorkshire Diamonds.

In 2020, Higham played for Lightning in the Rachael Heyhoe Flint Trophy. She took 8 wickets at an average of 24.37, the second best wicket return in the team. In December 2020, it was announced that Higham was one of the 41 female cricketers that had signed a full-time domestic contract. In 2021, she scored 101 runs at an average of 25.25 and took 5 wickets for the side in the Rachael Heyhoe Flint Trophy, as well as taking 2 wickets in the Charlotte Edwards Cup. Her 3/10 against North West Thunder in the Rachael Heyhoe Flint Trophy helped secure her side a 134-run victory. She also played for Trent Rockets in The Hundred, making six appearances. She was ever-present for Lightning in 2022, across the Charlotte Edwards Cup and the Rachael Heyhoe Flint Trophy, taking 12 wickets. In The Hundred, Higham moved to Northern Superchargers, playing all six matches for the side and taking three wickets. On 22 April 2023, she claimed her first five-wicket haul in List A cricket, with 5/19 for The Blaze (the new name of Lightning) against Central Sparks. Overall in 2023, she played 22 matches for The Blaze, and took 13 wickets at an average of 29.23 in the Rachael Heyhoe Flint Trophy. She also played eight matches for Northern Superchargers in The Hundred, taking nine wickets. In 2024, she played 23 matches for The Blaze, across the Rachael Heyhoe Flint Trophy and the Charlotte Edwards Cup, taking 20 wickets.
