= Linsey Smith =

English cricketer (born 1995)

Personal information
- Full name: Linsey Claire Neale Smith
- Born: 10 March 1995 (age 31); Hillingdon, Greater London, England
- Height: 5 ft 2 in (157 cm)
- Batting: Left-handed
- Bowling: Slow left-arm orthodox
- Role: Bowler

International information
- National side: England (2018–present)
- ODI debut (cap 153): 30 May 2025 v West Indies
- Last ODI: 29 October 2025 v South Africa
- ODI shirt no.: 50
- T20I debut (cap 47): 12 November 2018 v Bangladesh
- Last T20I: 12 July 2025 v India
- T20I shirt no.: 50

Domestic team information
- Years: Team
- 2011–2016: Berkshire
- 2016–2017: Southern Vipers
- 2017–present: Sussex
- 2018: Loughborough Lightning
- 2019: Yorkshire Diamonds
- 2020–2022: Northern Diamonds
- 2021–present: Northern Superchargers
- 2021/22: Melbourne Stars
- 2022/23–2023/24: Otago
- 2023–present: Southern Vipers
- 2023/24: Sydney Sixers
- 2024/25–present: Melbourne Renegades
- 2026–present: Royal Challengers Bengaluru (WPL)

Career statistics
Competition	WODI	WT20I	WLA	WT20
Matches	12	22	110	222
Runs scored	53	1	800	540
Batting average	26.50	1.00	12.90	9.31
100s/50s	0/0	0/0	0/1	0/0
Top score	27	1	51	34
Balls bowled	580	486	5,648	4,558
Wickets	22	23	147	216
Bowling average	19.09	23.39	22.23	20.81
5 wickets in innings	1	0	3	0
10 wickets in match	0	0	0	0
Best bowling	5/36	3/18	5/34	4/10
Catches/stumpings	3/–	2/–	33/–	57/–
Medal record
Women's cricket
Representing England
T20 World Cup
Runner-up	2026 England
- Source: CricketArchive, 13 November 2025

Linsey Claire Neale Smith (born 10 March 1995) is an English cricketer who plays for Sussex, Southern Vipers, Northern Superchargers and Sydney Sixers. A slow left-arm orthodox bowler, she originally played for Berkshire before moving to Sussex ahead of the 2017 season. In October 2018, she was named in the England women's cricket team squad for the 2018 ICC Women's World Twenty20 tournament, and made her Women's Twenty20 International cricket (WT20I) debut in the tournament against Bangladesh.

== Early life ==
Smith was born on 10 March 1995 in Hillingdon, Greater London. She attended Loughborough University.

== Domestic career ==
Smith made her List A debut in the 2011 Super Fours competition, playing for Rubies against Sapphires, in which she bowled five overs and conceded just five runs. Just over two weeks later she made her county debut, for Berkshire against Middlesex in the 2011 Women's County Championship, in which she returned figures of 0/45 from her 10 overs. Smith quickly became a regular in Berkshire's team, and took her maiden five-for the following season in a match against Somerset. In the 2015 Women's County Championship, she was her side's leading wicket-taker.

Smith was selected for the Southern Vipers squad in the 2016 Women's Cricket Super League as an injury replacement player. She took four wickets in her second match, against Yorkshire Diamonds, and went on to take 8 wickets in 5 games at the best bowling average in the tournament, 11.50. On the back of her success in the Super League, Smith signed for Sussex in early 2017.

Having won the Women's Cricket Super League with the Vipers in 2016, Smith went on to play for the runners-up in the next two seasons, for the Vipers in 2017 and for Loughborough Lightning in 2018. She played for Yorkshire Diamonds in 2019, taking 8 wickets at 32.50. Meanwhile, at county level, Smith took 7 wickets in Sussex's 2018 Women's County Championship Division Two winning season.

In 2020, Smith played four matches, including the final, in the Rachael Heyhoe Flint Trophy for Northern Diamonds. She took four wickets at an average of 25.50. In 2021, she took 12 wickets for the side in the Rachael Heyhoe Flint Trophy, 10 wickets in the Charlotte Edwards Cup and 9 wickets for Northern Superchargers in The Hundred. She also achieved her List A best bowling figures, taking 5/34 against Western Storm.

In October 2021, it was announced that Smith had signed for Melbourne Stars for the upcoming 2021–22 Women's Big Bash League season. In April 2022, she was bought by the Northern Superchargers for the 2022 season of The Hundred. She was the joint-leading wicket-taker in the 2022 Rachael Heyhoe Flint Trophy, with 13 wickets at an average of 18.07. At the end of the 2022 season, it was announced that Smith had left Northern Diamonds, re-joining Southern Vipers.

In January 2023, Smith signed for Otago Sparks for the remainder of the Super Smash, playing four matches for the side. In 2023, for Southern Vipers she was the third-highest wicket-taker in the Charlotte Edwards Cup and the fifth-highest wicket-taker in the Rachael Heyhoe Flint Trophy, with 13 and 19 wickets respectively. She also took nine wickets at an average of 15.88 in seven matches for Northern Superchargers in The Hundred. In October 2023, it was announced that Smith had signed for Sydney Sixers for the upcoming Women's Big Bash League season. She took 11 wickets in her 11 matches for the side, with an economy of 6.42.

== International career ==
In October 2018, Smith was named in the England squad for their upcoming 2018 ICC Women's World Twenty20 campaign. She made her debut in England's second game of the tournament, against Bangladesh, and took 1/17 from four overs, having Sanjida Islam caught to claim her maiden international wicket. She played one more match in the tournament, against South Africa, where she again took one wicket.

In February 2019, Smith was awarded a rookie contract by the England and Wales Cricket Board (ECB) for 2019, as well as being named as part of the squad for England's tours of India and Sri Lanka. Smith took 5 wickets at 10.60 in the three T20Is against India and took 4 wickets at 17.50 in the three T20Is against Sri Lanka. Smith played one match the following summer, taking 2/22 against the West Indies.

On 18 June 2020, Smith was named in a squad of 24 players to begin training ahead of international women's fixtures starting in England following the COVID-19 pandemic, but did not play a match that summer.

She was named in the England squad for the 2024 ICC Women's T20 World Cup. Smith took 2/11 and effected a run-out in England's opening match win over Bangladesh.

Smith was named in the England squad for the T20I part of their multi-format tour to South Africa in November 2024. She was also included in the England squad for the T20I part of the 2025 Women's Ashes series in Australia.
