= The Blaze (women's cricket) =

English women's cricket team

Team information
- Colours: Red and yellow
- Established: 2020
- Home ground: Trent Bridge; Grace Road; Haslegrave Ground; County Ground, Derby; Queen's Park; Lindum Sports Club Ground

History
- RHFT wins: 0
- CEC wins: 1
- T20 Blast (League 1) wins: 1
- Official website: The Blaze
Playing kit

The Blaze, previously known as Lightning, were a women's cricket team that represent the county of Nottinghamshire in English domestic women's cricket. Previously The Blaze represented the wider East Midlands region, in a regionalised structure from 2020 to 2024. The Blaze's home matches are held at various grounds, including Trent Bridge and the Haslegrave Ground, Loughborough. As of 2025, they play in the Women's One-Day Cup, the Women's Twenty20 Cup and the Women's T20 Blast. They are captained by Kirstie Gordon and coached by Craig Cumming.

Founded in 2020, Lightning carried over many elements of the WCSL team Loughborough Lightning. Until 2024, Lightning/The Blaze were partnered with four counties: Nottinghamshire, Leicestershire, Derbyshire and Lincolnshire. After being renamed The Blaze in 2023, the team won their first title in 2024, the Charlotte Edwards Cup, by defeating South East Stars in the final.

The team rebranded as Nottinghamshire at the conclusion of the 2026 season.

== History ==
In 2020, women's cricket in England and Wales was restructured, creating eight new 'regional hub' teams, with the intention of playing both 50-over and 20-over cricket. The East Midlands team, then known as Lightning, were one of the sides created under this structure, effectively replacing the Women's Cricket Super League team Loughborough Lightning and representing the region, partnering with Nottinghamshire, Leicestershire, Derbyshire and Lincolnshire, as well as Loughborough University. The side was to be captained by Kathryn Bryce and coached by Rob Taylor. Due to the COVID-19 pandemic, the 2020 season was truncated, and only 50-over cricket was played, in the Rachael Heyhoe Flint Trophy. Lightning finished bottom of the North Group in the competition, winning two of their six matches. At the end of the season, five Lightning players were given full-time domestic contracts, the first of their kind in England: Kathryn Bryce, Sarah Bryce, Bethan Ellis, Lucy Higham and Abigail Freeborn.

The following season, 2021, Lightning competed in both the Rachael Heyhoe Flint Trophy and the newly-formed Twenty20 competition, the Charlotte Edwards Cup. Lightning played their home matches at various grounds, including Trent Bridge and Grace Road. In the Charlotte Edwards Cup the side finished bottom of their group, losing all six of their matches. In the Rachael Heyhoe Flint Trophy, Lightning finished fourth in the group of eight, winning three of their seven matches. In the final match of the season, Lightning scored 320/6 in their victory over Central Sparks, with the Bryce sisters, Kathryn and Sarah, sharing a 207-run partnership, the highest across the competition. Lightning bowler Kirstie Gordon was the leading wicket-taker in the competition, with 16 wickets. Rob Taylor left his role as Head Coach at the end of the season, and was later replaced by Chris Guest.

Lightning again finished bottom of their group in the Charlotte Edwards Cup in 2022, but did win their first Twenty20 match, beating North West Thunder by 5 wickets. In September 2022, it was announced that Nottinghamshire CCC would become the new host of the team, replacing Loughborough University, and it was also announced that the name of the team would change. The side finished sixth out of eight in the 2022 Rachael Heyhoe Flint Trophy.

In November 2022, it was announced that the team had been renamed The Blaze. Kirstie Gordon was named as the side's new captain in April 2023. The side went unbeaten through the group stage of the Charlotte Edwards Cup, but lost in the final to Southern Vipers. They also qualified for the knockout stages in the Rachael Heyhoe Flint Trophy, finishing second in the group, before defeating South East Stars in the play-off. However, they again lost to Southern Vipers in the final.

In 2024, The Blaze won their first title, winning the Charlotte Edwards Cup. They finished top of the group stage after winning nine of their 10 matches, before defeating Central Sparks in the semi-final and South East Stars in the final. The Blaze batter Kathryn Bryce was the leading run-scorer in the tournament with 478 runs, whilst The Blaze bowler Kirstie Gordon was the leading wicket-taker in the tournament with 22 wickets. The side finished fifth in the group stage of the Rachael Heyhoe Flint Trophy.

At the end of the 2024 season, another restructuring of domestic cricket meant that regional sides would be replaced by county teams. However, in September 2024 it was confirmed that the Nottinghamshire-based side would retain the name and branding of The Blaze. Craig Cumming was appointed as the club's new head coach in December 2024, replacing Chris Guest who left to become England women Under-19 performance lead.

== Home grounds ==
Venue	Games hosted by season					
Venue	20	21	22	23	24	Total
Trent Bridge	1	1	1	2	4	9
Grace Road	2	1	2	2	2	9
Kibworth Cricket Club Ground	–	1	–	–	–	1
Haslegrave Ground	–	2	3	2	1	8
County Ground, Derby	–	1	1	1	2	5
John Fretwell Sporting Complex	–	–	–	2	–	2
Queen's Park	–	–	–	1	2	3
Lindum Sports Club Ground	–	–	–	–	1	1

== Players ==
=== Overseas players ===
- Piepa Cleary – Australia (2022)
- Nadine de Klerk – South Africa (2023–2024)
- Lizelle Lee – South Africa (2023)
- Heather Graham – Australia (2024)
- Orla Prendergast – Ireland (2024)

== Seasons ==
=== Rachael Heyhoe Flint Trophy ===
Season	Final standing	League standings									Notes
Season	Final standing	P	W	L	T	NR	BP	Pts	NRR	Pos	Notes
2020	Group stage	6	2	4	0	0	0	8	-0.113	4th	DNQ
2021	Group stage	7	3	4	0	0	1	13	+0.274	4th	DNQ
2022	Group stage	7	2	4	0	1	1	11	–0.630	6th	DNQ
2023	Runners-up	14	7	4	0	3	4	38	+0.173	2nd	Lost to Southern Vipers in the final
2024	Group stage	14	7	6	0	1	1	31	–0.176	5th	DNQ

=== Charlotte Edwards Cup ===
Season	Final standing	League standings									Notes
Season	Final standing	P	W	L	T	NR	BP	Pts	NRR	Pos	Notes
2021	Group stages	6	0	6	0	0	0	0	–1.139	4th	DNQ
2022	Group stages	6	1	5	0	0	0	4	–1.072	4th	DNQ
2023	Runners-up	7	7	0	0	0	4	32	+1.765	1st	Lost to Southern Vipers in the final
2024	Champions	10	9	1	0	0	3	39	+0.606	1st	Won against South East Stars in the final

== Statistics ==
=== Rachael Heyhoe Flint Trophy ===
Rachael Heyhoe Flint Trophy - summary of results
Year	Played	Wins	Losses	Tied	NR	Win %
2020	6	2	4	0	0	33.33
2021	7	3	4	0	0	42.86
2022	7	2	4	0	1	28.57
2023	16	8	5	0	3	50.00
2024	14	7	6	0	1	50.00
Total	50	22	23	0	5	44.00

- Abandoned matches are counted as NR (no result)
- Win or loss by super over or boundary count are counted as tied.

Rachael Heyhoe Flint Trophy - teamwise result summary
Opposition	Mat	Won	Lost	Tied	NR	Win %
Central Sparks	8	5	2	0	1	62.50
Northern Diamonds	8	3	4	0	1	37.50
North West Thunder	8	3	3	0	2	37.50
South East Stars	7	2	5	0	0	28.57
Southern Vipers	7	2	5	0	0	28.57
Sunrisers	6	4	2	0	0	66.67
Western Storm	6	3	2	0	1	50.00

=== Charlotte Edwards Cup ===
Charlotte Edwards Cup - summary of results
Year	Played	Wins	Losses	Tied	NR	Win %
2021	6	0	6	0	0	0.00
2022	6	1	5	0	0	16.67
2023	8	7	1	0	0	87.50
2024	12	11	1	0	0	91.67
Total	32	19	13	0	0	59.38

- Abandoned matches are counted as NR (no result)
- Win or loss by super over or boundary count are counted as tied.

Charlotte Edwards Cup - teamwise result summary
Opposition	Mat	Won	Lost	Tied	NR	Win %
Central Sparks	6	4	2	0	0	66.67
Northern Diamonds	5	3	2	0	0	60.00
North West Thunder	5	4	1	0	0	80.00
South East Stars	5	2	3	0	0	40.00
Southern Vipers	7	2	5	0	0	28.57
Sunrisers	2	2	0	0	0	100.00
Western Storm	2	2	0	0	0	100.00

== Records ==
=== Rachael Heyhoe Flint Trophy ===
- Highest team total: 320/6, v Central Sparks on 18 September 2021.
- Lowest (completed) team total: 87 v Sunrisers on 27 April 2024.
- Highest individual score: 162, Kathryn Bryce v Central Sparks on 18 September 2021.
- Best individual bowling analysis: 7/33, Nadine de Klerk v Northern Diamonds on 6 May 2023.
- Most runs: 1,232 runs in 39 matches, Sarah Bryce.
- Most wickets: 61 wickets in 40 matches, Kirstie Gordon.

=== Charlotte Edwards Cup ===
- Highest team total: 212/5, v Central Sparks on 26 May 2023.
- Lowest (completed) team total: 81 v Central Sparks on 10 July 2021.
- Highest individual score: 96*, Nat Sciver-Brunt v Central Sparks on 26 May 2023.
- Best individual bowling analysis: 5/12, Kirstie Gordon v North West Thunder on 2 June 2024.
- Most runs: 733 runs in 28 matches, Kathryn Bryce.
- Most wickets: 33 wickets in 27 matches, Kirstie Gordon.

== Honours ==
- Charlotte Edwards Cup:
  - Champions (1) – 2024

== See also ==
- Derbyshire Women cricket team
- Leicestershire Women cricket team
- Lincolnshire Women cricket team
- Nottinghamshire Women cricket team
- Loughborough Lightning (women's cricket)
