= Women's Super League (cricket) =

Kia Super League
- Countries: England and Wales (Note: Officially, the competition covered England and Wales, as the England and Wales Cricket Board governs the sport in both countries; however, all teams were based in England.)
- Administrator: ECB
- Format: Twenty20
- First edition: 2016
- Latest edition: 2019
- Tournament format: Round-robin and knockout stage
- Number of teams: 6
- Current trophy holder: Western Storm (2019)
- Most successful: Western Storm (2 titles)
- TV: Sky Sports
- Website: Kia Super League

The Women's Super League, commonly known as the Kia Super League (KSL) for sponsorship reasons, was a semi-professional women's Twenty20 cricket competition in England and Wales operated by the England and Wales Cricket Board (ECB). The competition featured six franchise teams, partnered with a variety of county teams and boards and universities, and was envisaged as a means to bridge the gap between amateur domestic cricket and the increasingly professional international game.

The KSL launched in 2016, with each team playing five group stage matches in a round-robin format, followed by a finals day; this was increased to ten group matches in 2018, following the ECB abandoning their initial plans to expand the tournament by also incorporating a 50-over competition.

The KSL ended after the 2019 season, ahead of the intended launch of the ECB's new format, The Hundred, and its city-based men's and women's franchises. Western Storm ended the competition as the most successful team with two titles, in 2017 and 2019. Southern Vipers and Surrey Stars won one title each, in 2016 and 2018 respectively.

== History ==
The England and Wales Cricket Board (ECB) announced their plans for the Women's Cricket Super League in June 2015, stating they would invest £3 million over four years. The competition would launch with six teams playing in a Twenty20 format, with the initial intention to add a 50-over competition in 2017. The ECB received 28 applications to host teams in the first stage of bidding, with the process subsequently moving to an interview stage. The six successful bids were announced in January 2016. The ECB hoped that the WCSL would develop as a semi-professional competition, with the intention of bridging the gap between the amateur Women's County Championship and international cricket, for which England players are centrally contracted as professionals.

It was decided ahead of the 2017 season that the planned 50-over competition would not after all take place, with the ECB and the franchises preferring to concentrate their resources on developing the existing Twenty20 format. For the 2018 season, the group stage of the competition was doubled in size, with each team now facing every other team home and away for a total of ten group matches.

In 2018, the ECB announced the planned launch of The Hundred in 2020, a new hundred-ball format competition to be played by newly created city-based franchises with both men's and women's teams. In conjunction with this, it was also announced that the WCSL would be scrapped after the 2019 season. It was replaced with a new regional domestic structure for women's cricket in England and Wales, encompassing The Hundred, the Rachael Heyhoe Flint Trophy and the Charlotte Edwards Cup.

== Teams ==
The ECB announced the six hosts for the WCSL in January 2016, with hosting rights awarded for four years of the competition, 2016 to 2019 inclusive. The hosts and partners included seven First-class counties, five minor counties and three universities. Team names, along with the fixtures and venues for the 2016 season, were announced in February 2016. The allocation of England players to the teams was announced in April 2016, with overseas player allocations being announced later that month.

Location of WCSL teams

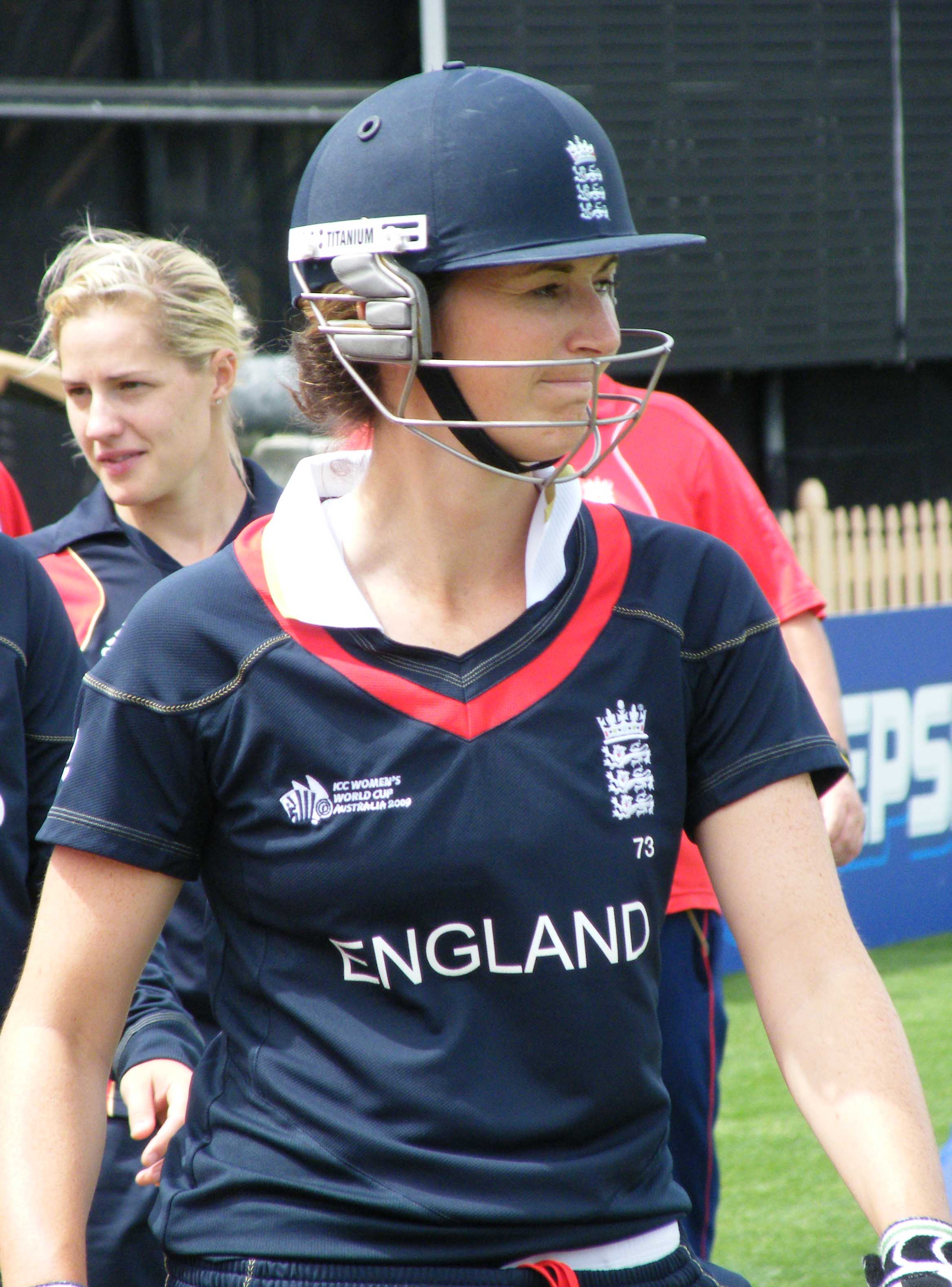
Former England captain Charlotte Edwards led the Southern Vipers to the inaugural WCSL title in 2016

Team	Hosts and partners	Home grounds	Captain
Lancashire Thunder	Lancashire Cricket Board; Lancashire County Cricket Club; Lancashire County Cricket Club Foundation	Old Trafford, Manchester; Stanley Park, Blackpool; Aigburth, Liverpool; Trafalgar Road Ground, Southport; Chester Boughton Hall CC, Chester	Kathryn Cross
Loughborough Lightning	Loughborough University	Haslegrave Ground, Loughborough; Edgbaston, Birmingham; Trent Bridge, Nottingham	Georgia Elwiss
Southern Vipers	Hampshire Cricket; Berkshire Cricket; Dorset Cricket; Isle of Wight Cricket Board; Oxfordshire Cricket; Southampton Solent University; Sussex Cricket; Wiltshire Cricket	Rose Bowl, Southampton; County Ground, Hove; Arundel Castle, Arundel	Tammy Beaumont
Surrey Stars	Surrey County Cricket Club	The Oval, London; Woodbridge Road, Guildford	Natalie Sciver
Western Storm	Somerset County Cricket Club; Gloucestershire County Cricket Club; University of Exeter	County Ground, Taunton; Bristol County Ground, Bristol; College Ground, Cheltenham	Heather Knight
Yorkshire Diamonds	Yorkshire County Cricket Club	Headingley, Leeds; Clifton Park, York; North Marine Road Ground, Scarborough	Lauren Winfield

== Tournament results ==
List of Women's Cricket Super League champions
Year	Winner	Runners-up	Venue	Player (club)	Runs	Player (club)	Wickets	Notes
Year	Winner	Runners-up	Venue	Leading run-scorer		Leading wicket-taker		Notes
2016	Southern Vipers	Western Storm	County Cricket Ground, Chelmsford	Stafanie Taylor (Western Storm)	289	Stafanie Taylor (Western Storm)	11	
2017	Western Storm	Southern Vipers	County Cricket Ground, Hove	Rachel Priest (Western Storm)	261	Nat Sciver (Surrey Stars)	12	
2018	Surrey Stars	Loughborough Lightning	County Cricket Ground, Hove	Smriti Mandhana (Western Storm)	421	Kirstie Gordon (Loughborough Lightning)	17	
2019	Western Storm	Southern Vipers	County Cricket Ground, Hove	Danielle Wyatt (Southern Vipers)	466	Freya Davies (Western Storm)	19	

== Format ==
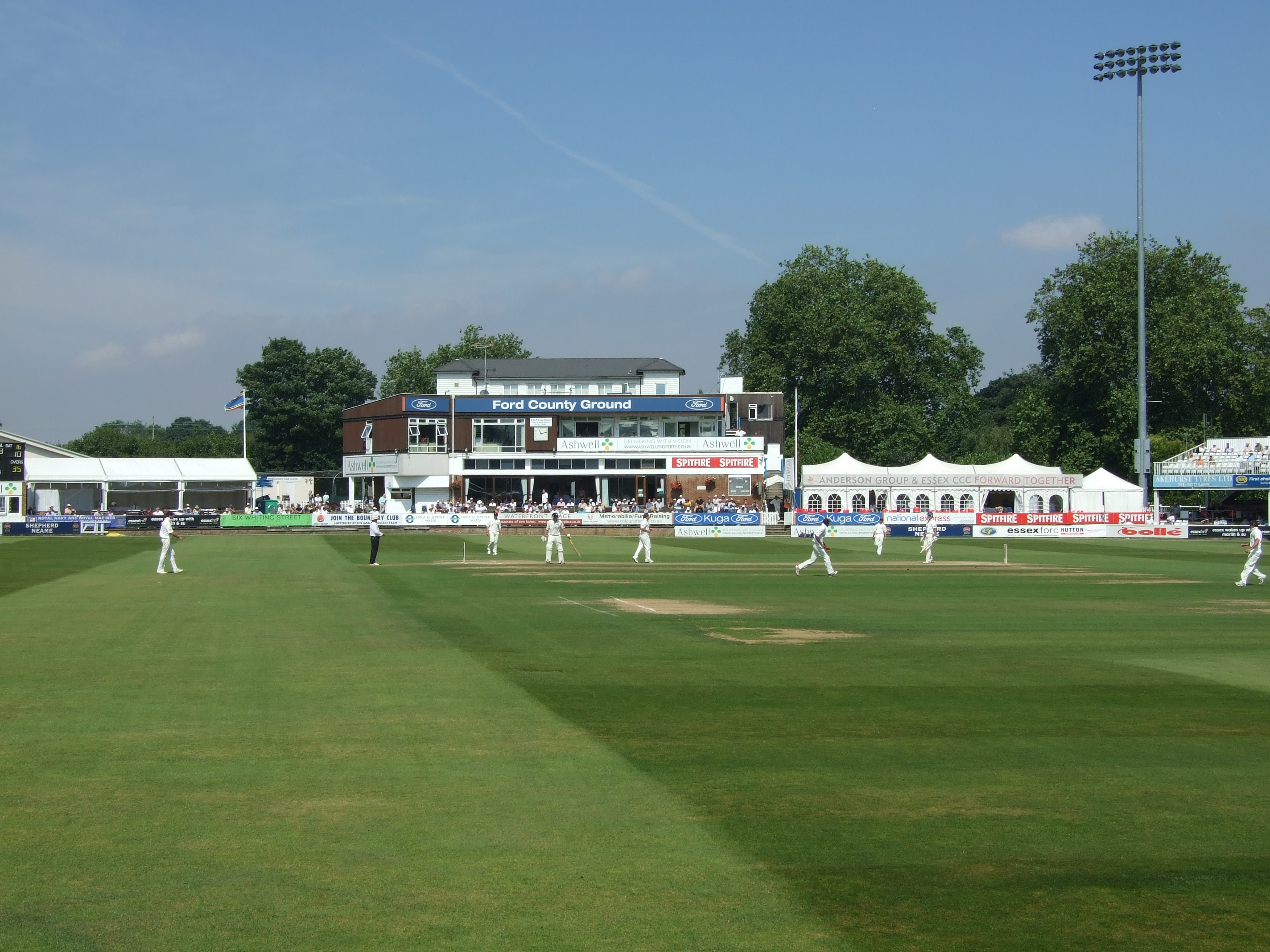
The County Ground in Chelmsford staged the 2016 WCSL finals day

Matches were played in a Twenty20 format. Teams played each other in a round robin, from which the top three teams qualified for Finals Day at a neutral venue. In 2016 and 2017 teams played each other once, and in 2018 and 2019 teams played each other twice. The second and third placed teams then met in the semi-final for the right to face the first placed team in the final. Finals Day was staged at the County Cricket Ground, Chelmsford in 2016 and at the County Cricket Ground, Hove from 2017 to 2019.

== Media coverage ==
The 2016 tournament was not televised, but seven group matches and the finals day were broadcast live on BBC radio's Test Match Special. In 2017, Sky Sports broadcast eight matches live – six group stage matches as part of double-headers with a men's T20 Blast match, followed by both finals day matches. They broadcast twelve live matches from the expanded 2018 competition.

== Sponsorship ==
The ECB announced a two-year title sponsorship agreement for the WCSL with Kia Motors in March 2016, as a result of which the competition was known as the Kia Super League. The deal was extended to cover the final two years of the competition in 2017.
