= Loughborough Lightning (cricket) =

English women's cricket team

Personnel
- Captain: Georgia Elwiss
- Coach: Rob Taylor (2018–2019); Salliann Briggs (2016–2017)

Team information
- Colours: Purple
- Founded: 2016
- Home ground: Haslegrave Ground, Loughborough
- Secondary home ground(s): Trent Bridge, Nottingham

History
- WCSL wins: 0
- Official website: Loughborough Lightning
T20 kit

Loughborough Lightning were an English women's Twenty20 cricket team based at Loughborough University. They were formed in 2016 to compete in the inaugural season of the Women's Cricket Super League. They primarily played their home matches at the Haslegrave Ground. They were coached by Rob Taylor and were captained by Georgia Elwiss. The team was partnered with Loughborough University. Together with the netball team and the women's rugby union team, the cricket team was one of three women's sports teams based at Loughborough University that used the Loughborough Lightning name. In 2020, following reforms to the structure of women's domestic cricket, some elements of the Loughborough Lightning were retained for a new team, named just Lightning and representing a broader region.

== History ==
=== 2016–2019: Women's Cricket Super League ===
Loughborough Lightning were formed in 2016 to compete in the new Women's Cricket Super League, partnering with Loughborough University and playing across the Midlands. In the first season of the WCSL, the Lightning finished 3rd in the group stage, progressing to the semi-final, where they were beaten by eventual runners-up Western Storm. The following season, 2017, saw Loughborough miss out on Finals Day, finishing 4th with two wins.

2018 was Loughborough Lightning's most successful season, as they topped the group with 7 wins from 10 games, progressing straight to the final. However, they were defeated by Surrey Stars by 66 runs after the Stars' Lizelle Lee hit a century. Lightning bowler Kirstie Gordon was the leading wicket-taker of the tournament, with 17. In 2019, the Lightning again progressed to Finals Day after finishing 2nd in the group with 7 victories, but were beaten in the semi-final by the Southern Vipers. Following this season, women's cricket in England was restructured and Loughborough Lightning were disbanded as part of the reforms; however they survived in spirit for a new team, Lightning, who represented a larger area, but retained some of their players.

== Home grounds ==
Venue	Games hosted by season				
Venue	16	17	18	19	Total
Haslegrave Ground	3	1	4	4	12
County Ground, Derby	–	1	–	–	1
Edgbaston Cricket Ground	–	–	1	–	1
Trent Bridge	–	–	–	1	1

== Players ==
Final squad, 2019 season

- No. denotes the player's squad number, as worn on the back of their shirt.
- ‡ denotes players with international caps.

No.	Name	Nationality	Birth date	Batting style	Bowling style	Notes
Batters
1	Georgia Adams	England	4 October 1993 (age 32)	Right-handed	Right-arm off break	
22	Mignon du Preez ‡	South Africa	13 June 1989 (age 37)	Right-handed	Right-arm medium	Overseas player
All-rounders
17	Kathryn Bryce ‡	Scotland	17 November 1997 (age 28)	Right-handed	Right-arm medium	
20	Alice Monaghan	England	20 March 2000 (age 26)	Right-handed	Right-arm medium	
25	Jo Gardner	England	25 March 1997 (age 29)	Right-handed	Right-arm medium	
24	Jenny Gunn ‡	England	9 May 1986 (age 40)	Right-handed	Right-arm medium	England Performance squad
34	Georgia Elwiss ‡	England	31 May 1991 (age 35)	Right-handed	Right-arm medium	Club captain; England Performance squad
50	Hayley Matthews ‡	West Indies	19 March 1998 (age 28)	Right-handed	Right-arm off break	Overseas player
58	Chamari Atapattu ‡	Sri Lanka	9 February 1990 (age 36)	Left-handed	Right-arm medium	Overseas player
Wicket-keepers
27	Abigail Freeborn	England	12 November 1996 (age 29)	Right-handed	—	
40	Amy Jones ‡	England	13 June 1993 (age 33)	Right-handed	—	England Performance squad
Bowlers
7	Lucy Higham	England	17 October 1997 (age 28)	Right-handed	Right-arm off break	
16	Sarah Glenn	England	27 February 1999 (age 27)	Right-handed	Right-arm leg break	
46	Tara Norris	England	4 June 1998 (age 28)	Left-handed	Left-arm medium	
48	Kirstie Gordon ‡	England	20 October 1997 (age 28)	Right-handed	Slow left-arm orthodox	England Performance squad

=== Overseas players ===
- Dane van Niekerk – South Africa (2016)
- Ellyse Perry – Australia (2016–2017)
- Sophie Devine – New Zealand (2016, 2018)
- Kristen Beams – Australia (2017)
- Elyse Villani – Australia (2017–2018)
- Rachael Haynes – Australia (2018)
- Mignon du Preez – South Africa (2019)
- Chamari Atapattu – Sri Lanka (2019)
- (Cricket West Indies) Hayley Matthews – West Indies (2019)

== Seasons ==
Season	Final standing	League standings									Notes
Season	Final standing	P	W	L	T	NR	BP	Pts	NRR	Pos	Notes
2016	Losing semi-finalists: 3rd	5	3	2	0	0	2	8	+0.170	3rd	Lost to Western Storm in the semi-final
2017	Group stage	5	2	3	0	0	2	10	+0.664	4th	DNQ
2018	Runners-up	10	7	3	0	0	5	33	+1.361	1st	Lost to Surrey Stars in the final
2019	Losing semi-finalists: 3rd	10	7	3	0	0	4	32	+0.792	2nd	Lost to Southern Vipers in the semi-final

== Statistics ==
=== Overall Results ===
Women's Cricket Super League - summary of results
Year	Played	Wins	Losses	Tied	NR	Win %
2016	6	3	2	0	0	50.00
2017	5	2	3	0	0	40.00
2018	11	7	3	0	0	63.63
2019	11	7	3	0	0	63.63
Total	33	19	14	0	0	57.57

- Abandoned matches are counted as NR (no result)
- Win or loss by super over or boundary count are counted as tied.

=== Teamwise Result summary ===
Opposition	Mat	Won	Lost	Tied	NR	Win %
Lancashire Thunder	6	5	1	0	0	73.33
Southern Vipers	7	3	4	0	0	42.85
Surrey Stars	7	5	2	0	0	71.42
Western Storm	7	2	5	0	0	28.57
Yorkshire Diamonds	6	4	2	0	0	66.66

== Records ==
- Highest team total: 174/7, v Southern Vipers on 4 August 2018.
- Lowest team total: 97, v Southern Vipers on 14 August 2016.
- Highest individual score: 91, Dane van Niekerk v Surrey Stars on 12 August 2016.
- Best individual bowling analysis: 3/10, Jenny Gunn v Lancashire Thunder on 22 July 2018.
- Most Runs: 636 in 31 matches, Amy Jones.
- Most wickets: 28 wickets in 21 matches, Kirstie Gordon.
