= Nick Cook (cricketer) =

English cricketer and umpire

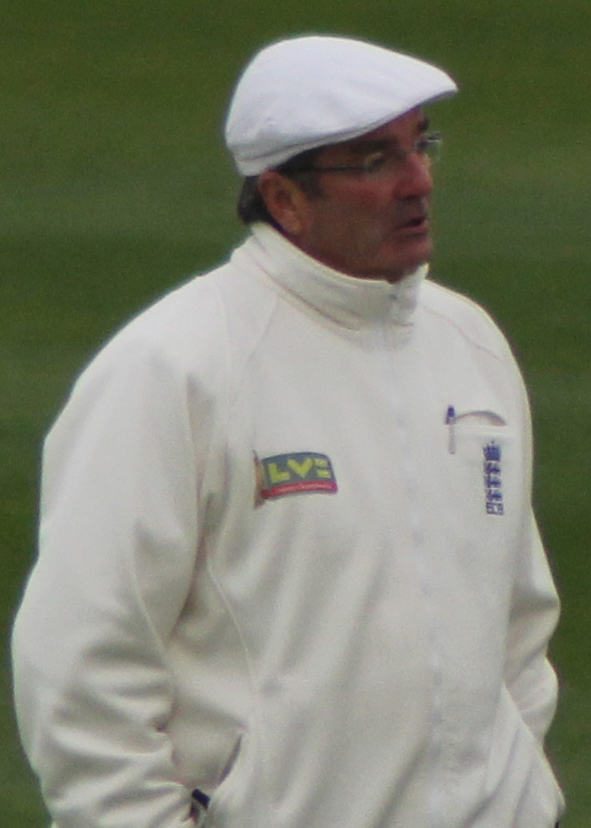

Personal information
- Full name: Nicholas Grant Billson Cook
- Born: 17 June 1956 (age 70); Leicester, England
- Batting: Right-handed
- Bowling: Slow left-arm orthodox

International information
- National side: England
- Test debut (cap 501): 11 August 1983 v New Zealand
- Last Test: 24 August 1989 v Australia
- ODI debut (cap 73): 26 March 1984 v Pakistan
- Last ODI: 22 October 1989 v Pakistan

Umpiring information
- WTests umpired: 1 (2009)
- WODIs umpired: 4 (2009–2012)
- WT20Is umpired: 7 (2008–2016)

Career statistics
Competition	Test	ODI	FC	LA
Matches	15	3	356	223
Runs scored	179	–	3,138	491
Batting average	8.52	–	11.66	9.26
100s/50s	0/0	–/–	0/4	0/0
Top score	31	–	75	23
Balls bowled	4,174	144	64,463	10,077
Wickets	52	5	879	200
Bowling average	32.48	19.00	29.01	34.06
5 wickets in innings	4	0	31	0
10 wickets in match	1	0	4	0
Best bowling	6/65	2/18	7/34	4/22
Catches/stumpings	5/–	2/–	197/–	74/–
- Source: CricInfo, 14 June 2021

Nicholas Grant Billson Cook (born 17 June 1956) is an English cricket umpire and former player who appeared in 15 Tests and three ODIs between 1983 and 1989. A slow left-arm orthodox spin bowler and a lower order right-handed batsman, he played first-class and List A cricket from 1978 to 1994. He is currently an ECB appointed umpire on the professional circuit. He was born in Leicester and attended Lutterworth Grammar School.

Cook made his international debut against New Zealand. One of three England debutants in the match along with Neil Foster and Chris Smith, Cook was called up because of an injury to Phil Edmonds, which occurred so late that Cook had already started playing in a County Championship match against Essex and had to be replaced by Jonathan Agnew as full substitute. He picked up 32 wickets in his first four Tests, taking four five-fors, including one on debut (after he had been called up at short notice), and a best bowling match return of 11 for 83 against Pakistan at Karachi. As of 2022, these remain the best Test match figures ever taken by a visiting bowler in Pakistan, and he holds the record for the most Test wickets by an English bowler in Pakistan.

However, Cook's next 11 Tests, spread over a period of five years, fetched him 20 wickets at an average of 56.75. He had more success as a bowler against Pakistan and New Zealand than against Australia and the West Indies. He was finally dropped from Test cricket after the 1989 series against Australia in which England surrendered the Ashes. His total of 52 Test wickets were taken at an average of 32.48. He played his last one-day international that autumn in the Nehru Cup. He finished on the winning team of each of his three one-day internationals, although after England won his first two Tests against New Zealand, he never again finished on the winning team in Test matches.

In the domestic game, Cook played for Leicestershire, before later moving to Northamptonshire. He was part of the Northamptonshire team that lost the final of both the Benson and Hedges Cup and the NatWest Trophy at Lord's in 1987, but five years later also featured on the winning team in the final of the latter tournament.

Since retiring from the game, Cook has become an umpire and in November 2008, was promoted to the ECB full list for the 2009 season.
