= Haslegrave Ground =

Cricket ground in Loughborough, England

Coordinates: 52.7674°N 1.2301°W

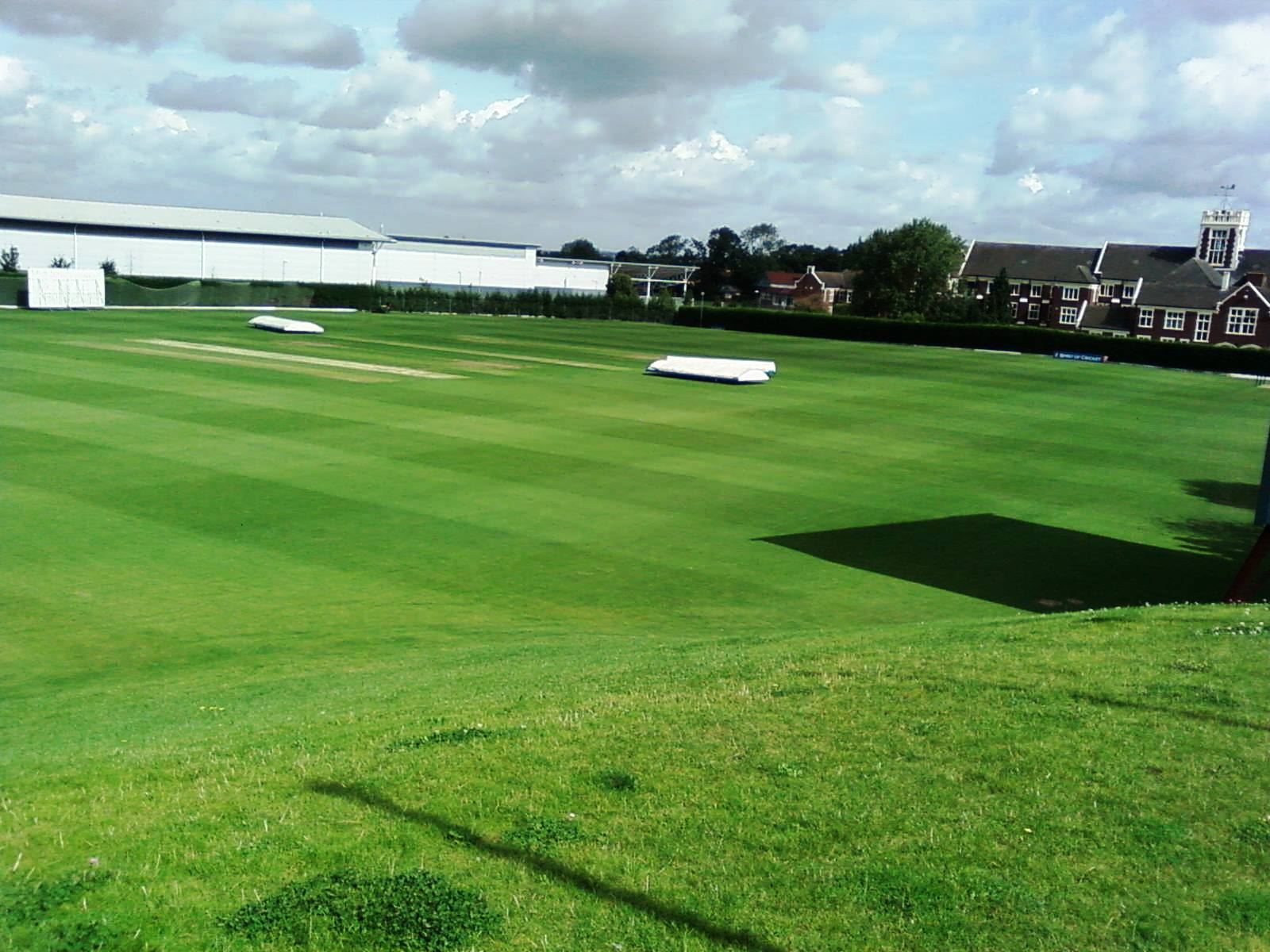

Ground information
- Location: Loughborough, Leicestershire
- Establishment: 1983 (first recorded match)
- Capacity: n/a

International information
- First WODI: 11 July 2008: England v West Indies
- Last WODI: 3 July 2013: England v Pakistan
- First WT20I: 23 June 2012: England v Ireland
- Last WT20I: 5 July 2013: England v Pakistan

Team information
Loughborough MCCU	(2011-)
Loughborough Lightning	(2016-2019)
The Blaze	(2021–)
- As of 13 July 2024; Source: Ground profile

Haslegrave Ground is a cricket ground in Loughborough, Leicestershire. The ground is based at Loughborough University, adjacent to the National Cricket Performance Centre, and is the home ground for Loughborough MCC University. The first recorded match on the ground was in 1983, when Loughborough Students played Exeter University in the quarter finals of the University Athletics Union Championship. The ground hosted four Women's One Day Internationals between 2008 and 2013 and six Women's Twenty20 International matches in 2012 and 2013. It also hosted a single first class match in 2011 between Loughborough MCCU and Northamptonshire. It was the home ground for Loughborough Lightning in the Women's Cricket Super League from 2016 to 2019 and is one of the grounds used by successor team, The Blaze, from 2021.

== See also ==
- College Ground, Loughborough – previous cricket ground at Loughborough University
