= Georgia Elwiss =

England cricketer (born 1991)

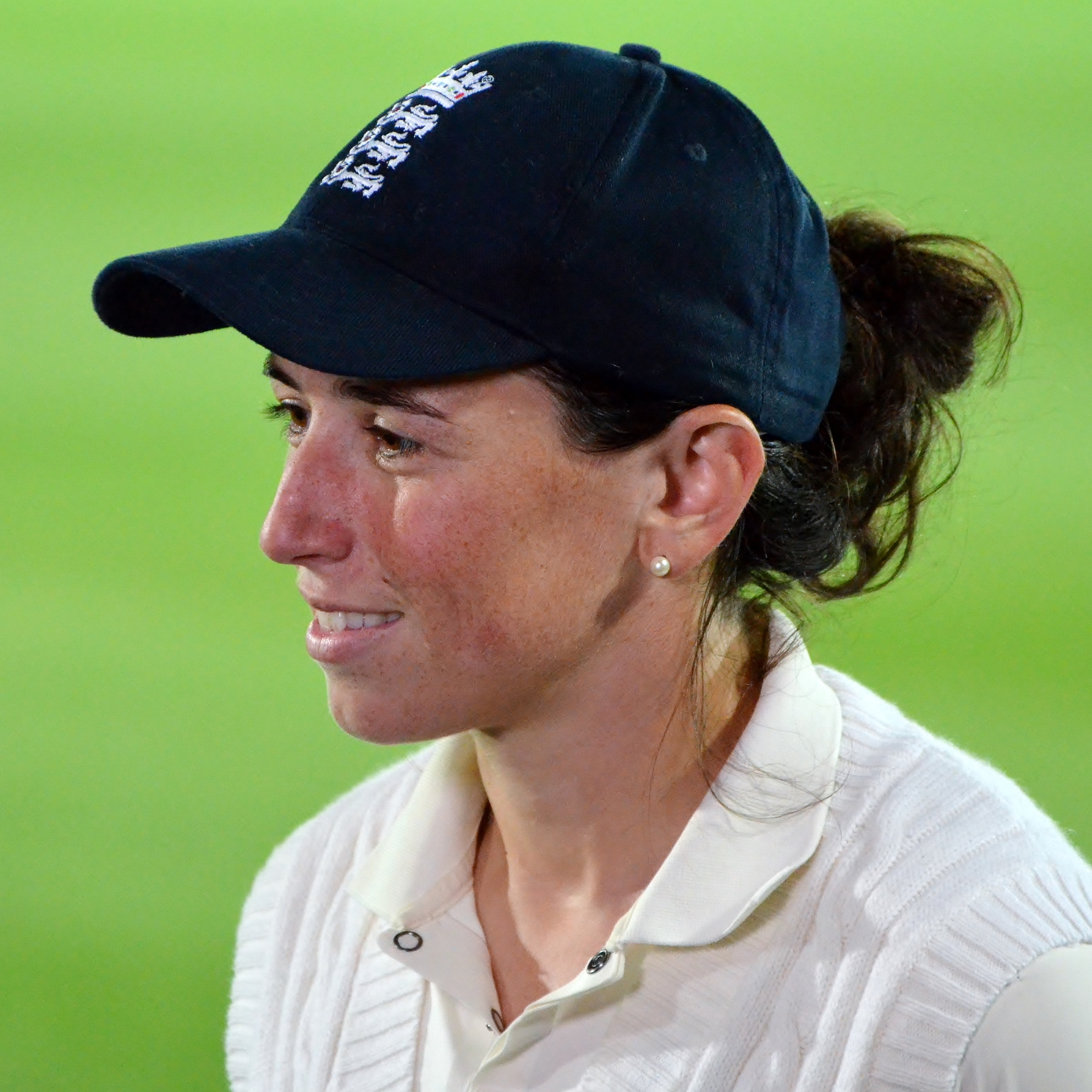

Personal information
- Full name: Georgia Amanda Elwiss
- Born: 31 May 1991 (age 35); Wolverhampton, England
- Batting: Right-handed
- Bowling: Right-arm medium-fast
- Role: Bowler

International information
- National side: England (2011–present)
- Test debut (cap 156): 11 August 2015 v Australia
- Last Test: 16 June 2021 v India
- ODI debut (cap 120): 23 October 2011 v South Africa
- Last ODI: 28 February 2019 v India
- ODI shirt no.: 34
- T20I debut (cap 31): 30 October 2011 v South Africa
- Last T20I: 28 July 2019 v Australia

Domestic team information
- Years: Team
- 2004–2010: Staffordshire
- 2009/10–2010/11: Australian Capital Territory
- 2011–2022: Sussex
- 2016–2019: Loughborough Lightning
- 2017/18–2018/19: Melbourne Stars
- 2021–2024: Southern Vipers
- 2021–2022: Birmingham Phoenix
- 2023–2025: Welsh Fire
- 2025–present: The Blaze
- 2026: Trent Rockets

Career statistics
Competition	WTest	WODI	WT20I	WLA
Matches	4	36	14	187
Runs scored	145	388	29	2,771
Batting average	29.00	20.42	9.66	24.09
100s/50s	0/0	0/2	0/0	3/12
Top score	46	77	18	115
Balls bowled	174	1,097	163	7,134
Wickets	1	26	8	184
Bowling average	91.00	26.11	20.12	21.16
5 wickets in innings	0	0	0	3
10 wickets in match	0	0	0	0
Best bowling	1/40	3/17	2/9	6/17
Catches/stumpings	1/–	11/–	3/–	51/–
- Source: CricketArchive, 19 October 2023

Georgia Amanda Elwiss (born 31 May 1991) is an English cricketer who currently plays for The Blaze, Trent Rockets and England.

== Career ==
She was raised in Wolverhampton with her brother Luke and is a right-arm medium fast bowler and right-handed batsman. She has played for the Diamonds in the UK and gained experience with ACT Women in Australia in the 2010/11 season. She was picked for the England one day tour of South Africa in October 2011 and made her one-day international debut for England against South Africa at Potchefstroom on 23 October 2011. She made her Twenty/20 debut on the same tour at Potchefstroom on 30 Oct 2011.

Elwiss attended Wolverhampton Girls' High School from 2002 until 2009, and went on to study at Loughborough University and then on to Loughborough MCC University

She is the holder of one of the first tranche of 18 ECB central contracts for women players, which were announced in April 2014.

In April 2015, she was named as one of the England women's Academy squad tour to Dubai, where England women played their Australian counterparts in two 50-over games, and two Twenty20 matches.

Elwiss was a member of the winning women's team at the 2017 Women's Cricket World Cup held in England.

In November 2018, she was named in the Melbourne Stars' squad for the 2018–19 Women's Big Bash League season. In February 2019, she was awarded a full central contract by the England and Wales Cricket Board (ECB) for 2019. In January 2020, she was named in England's squad for the 2020 ICC Women's T20 World Cup in Australia.

On 18 June 2020, Elwiss was named in a squad of 24 players to begin training ahead of international women's fixtures starting in England following the COVID-19 pandemic. In June 2021, Elwiss was named in England's Test squad for their one-off match against India. Ahead of the inaugural season of The Hundred, Elwiss was signed by the Birmingham Phoenix.

In December 2021, Elwiss was named in England's A squad for their tour to Australia, with the matches being played alongside the Women's Ashes. In April 2022, she was bought by the Birmingham Phoenix for the 2022 season of The Hundred.

Elwiss joined The Blaze on a two-year contract in September 2024.

Elwiss was signed by Trent Rockets in the 2026 auction for The Hundred.

== Personal life ==
Elwiss is in a relationship with England women's national football team goalkeeper Carly Telford.
