= James Middlebrook =

English cricketer (born 1977)

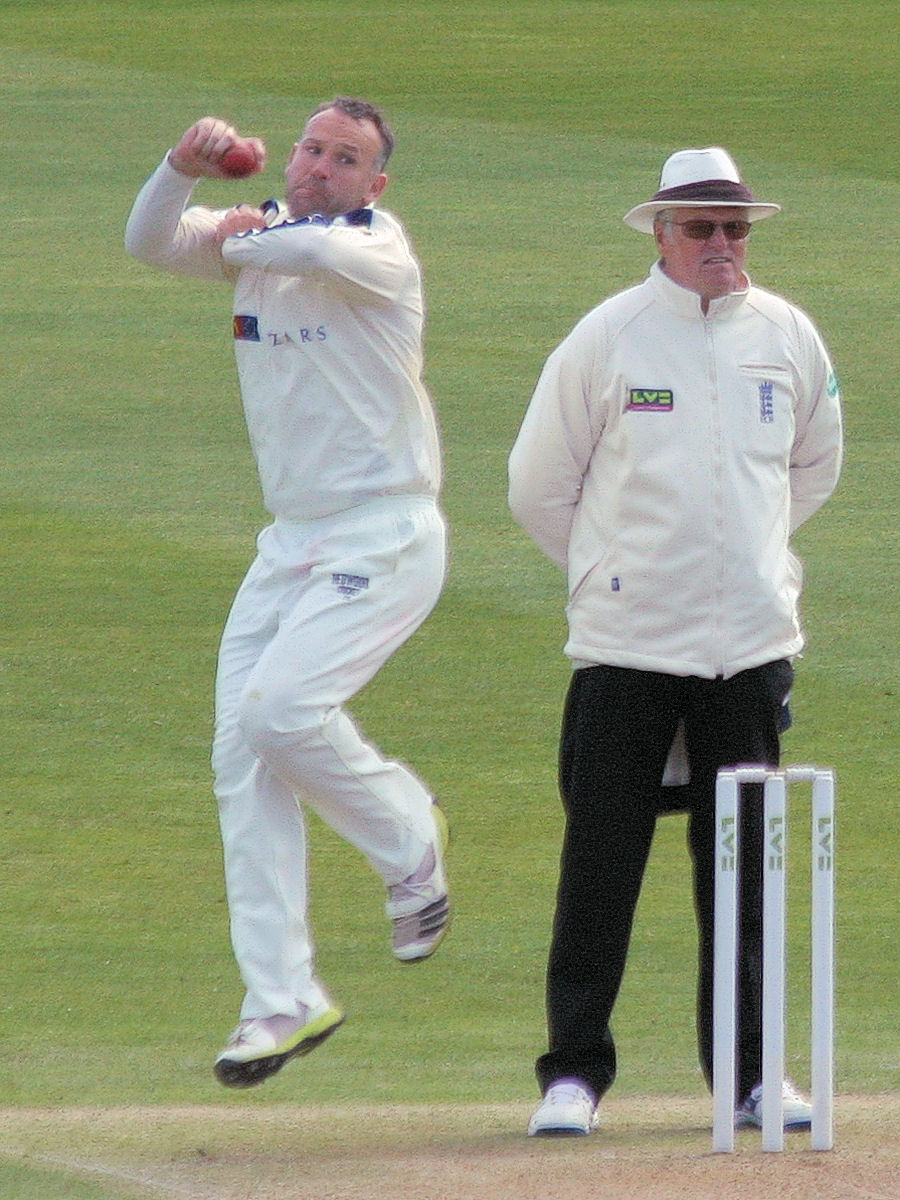
- James Middlebrook (left, now an umpire) bowling.

Personal information
- Full name: James Daniel Middlebrook
- Born: 13 May 1977 (age 49); Leeds, Yorkshire, England
- Nickname: Dog
- Height: 185 cm (6 ft 1 in)
- Batting: Right-handed
- Bowling: Right-arm off break
- Role: All rounder

Domestic team information
- Years: Team
- 1998–2001: Yorkshire
- 2002–2009: Essex
- 2010–2014: Northamptonshire (squad no. 7)
- 2015: Yorkshire

Umpiring information
- WODIs umpired: 2 (2023)
- WT20Is umpired: 7 (2024–2025)

Career statistics
Competition	FC	LA	T20
Matches	226	192	106
Runs scored	7,873	1,737	613
Batting average	27.72	20.19	13.62
100s/50s	10/35	0/1	0/0
Top score	127	57*	43
Balls bowled	34,871	6,745	1,532
Wickets	475	146	56
Bowling average	38.15	36.43	34.67
5 wickets in innings	15	0	0
10 wickets in match	1	0	0
Best bowling	6/78	4/27	3/13
Catches/stumpings	112/–	51/–	27/–
- Source: ESPNcricinfo, 21 January 2016

James Middlebrook (born 13 May 1977) is a former English first-class cricketer, who last played for Yorkshire County Cricket Club on a short-term contract. He played as an all-rounder, batting right-handed and bowling off spin. Since retiring from professional cricket Middlebrook has become an umpire, standing in first-class matches from the 2017 season onwards.

== Career ==
Middlebrook was born in Leeds, Yorkshire, and made his first-class debut in the 1998 English cricket season with Yorkshire, but was released by them in 2001. From 2002 to 2008 he plied his trade with Essex, taking 32 first-class wickets and 20 one day wickets. Middlebrook joined Northamptonshire at the start of the 2010 season, where he regularly opened the batting. In January 2010, Middlebrook along with new team-mate David Sales, was picked to represent the Marylebone Cricket Club (MCC) against Durham in Abu Dhabi. Despite being Northants leading runscorer in the 2014 season, Middlebrook was released following the club's relegation to Division Two of the County Championship. He was signed by Yorkshire on a short-term contract as cover for Adil Rashid whilst the leg-spinner was part of England's tour party in the West Indies.
