= Jenny Gunn =

English cricketer

Jenny Gunn MBE
Personal information
- Full name: Jennifer Louise Gunn
- Born: 9 May 1986 (age 40); Nottingham, England
- Nickname: Trigger
- Batting: Right-handed
- Bowling: Right-arm medium
- Role: All-rounder
- Relatives: Bryn Gunn (father)

International information
- National side: England (2004–2019)
- Test debut (cap 142): 21 August 2004 v New Zealand
- Last Test: 13 August 2014 v India
- ODI debut (cap 103): 15 February 2004 v South Africa
- Last ODI: 13 June 2019 v West Indies
- ODI shirt no.: 24
- T20I debut (cap 6): 5 August 2004 v New Zealand
- Last T20I: 23 June 2018 v South Africa

Domestic team information
- Years: Team
- 2001–2010: Nottinghamshire
- 2006/07–2007/08: South Australia
- 2008/09: Western Australia
- 2011: Yorkshire
- 2012–2015: Nottinghamshire
- 2016–2018: Warwickshire
- 2016–2017: Yorkshire Diamonds
- 2018–2019: Loughborough Lightning
- 2019: Nottinghamshire
- 2020–2022: Northern Diamonds
- 2022: Northern Superchargers

Career statistics
Competition	WTest	WODI	WT20I	WLA
Matches	11	144	104	323
Runs scored	391	1,629	682	6,465
Batting average	23.00	19.62	13.91	31.23
100s/50s	0/1	0/5	0/1	6/33
Top score	62*	73	69	142*
Balls bowled	2,189	5,906	1,385	12,907
Wickets	29	136	75	320
Bowling average	22.24	28.10	19.82	23.70
5 wickets in innings	1	2	1	2
10 wickets in match	0	0	0	0
Best bowling	5/19	5/22	5/18	5/22
Catches/stumpings	6/–	49/–	58/–	108/–
- Source: CricketArchive, 3 October 2022

Jennifer Louise Gunn MBE (born 9 May 1986) is an English former cricketer who plays as a right-arm medium bowler and right-handed batter. She appeared in 11 Test matches, 144 One Day Internationals and 104 Twenty20 Internationals for England between 2004 and her international retirement in October 2019. She played domestic cricket for Nottinghamshire, Yorkshire, Warwickshire, Yorkshire Diamonds, Loughborough Lightning, Northern Diamonds, Northern Superchargers, South Australia and Western Australia.

== Early career ==
A seam bowler and lower-middle-order batsman, she is the daughter of former Nottingham Forest player Bryn Gunn. She played for Nottinghamshire and Western Australia and made her Test debut at 17 against New Zealand at Scarborough in 2004. She also played for Ransome & Marles CC, Newark, Nottinghamshire. A late injury forced her out of the 2009 Women's Cricket World Cup final in Sydney but she was at the crease when England defeated New Zealand in that year's World Twenty20 final at Lord's.

== International career ==
She was vice-captain of the England side that beat Australia in the female version of the Ashes in 2013 and 2013–14. She was appointed Member of the Order of the British Empire (MBE) in the 2014 Birthday Honours for services to cricket.

She is the holder of one of the first tranche of 18 ECB central contracts for women players, which were announced in April 2014. She signed for Warwickshire ahead of the 2016 season.

Gunn was a member of the winning women's team at the 2017 Women's Cricket World Cup held in England.

In March 2018, during the 2018 Women's T20I Tri Nations Series in India, Gunn became the first cricketer, male or female, to play in 100 T20 International matches.

In October 2018, she was named in England's squad for the 2018 ICC Women's World Twenty20 tournament in the West Indies.

In February 2019, she was awarded a full central contract by the England and Wales Cricket Board (ECB) for 2019. In June 2019, the ECB named her in England's squad for their opening match against Australia to contest the Women's Ashes.

In October 2019, Gunn announced her retirement from international cricket.

== Domestic cricket ==
In April 2022, she was signed by the Northern Superchargers for the 2022 season of The Hundred. She announced her retirement from all cricket at the end of the 2022 season.
