= Kirstie Gordon =

Scottish cricketer (born 1997)

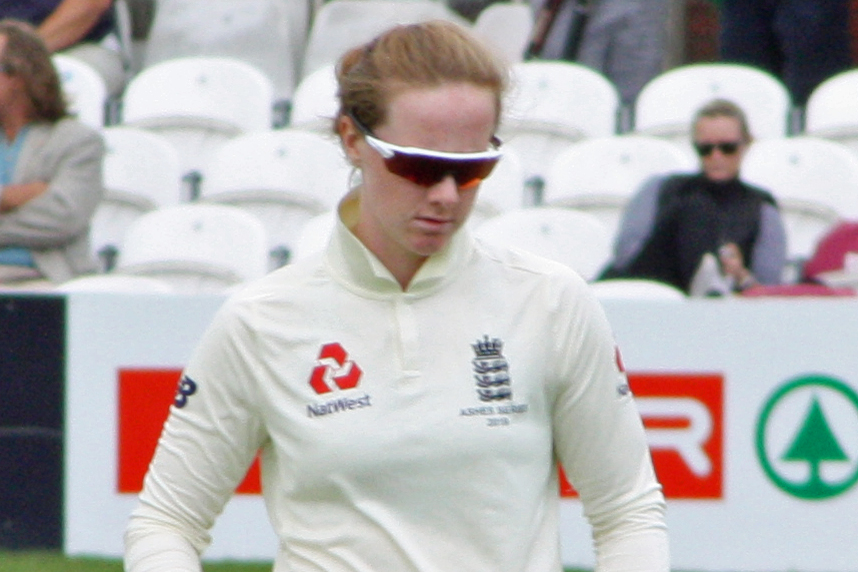
- Gordon during the one-off Test of the 2019 Women's Ashes

Personal information
- Full name: Kirstie Louise Gordon
- Born: 20 October 1997 (age 29); Huntly, Aberdeenshire, Scotland
- Batting: Right-handed
- Bowling: Slow left-arm orthodox
- Role: Bowler

International information
- National sides: England (2018–2019); Scotland (2012–2017)
- Only Test (cap 159): 18 July 2019; England v Australia
- T20I debut (cap 46): 12 November 2018; England v Bangladesh
- Last T20I: 24 November 2018; England v Australia

Domestic team information
- Years: Team
- 2016–2019: Nottinghamshire
- 2018–2019: Loughborough Lightning
- 2020–2022: Kent
- 2020–present: The Blaze
- 2021–2022: Birmingham Phoenix
- 2022/23: Otago
- 2023–present: Trent Rockets

Career statistics
Competition	WTest	WT20I	WLA	WT20
Matches	1	5	78	115
Runs scored	–	1	483	307
Batting average	—	—	12.38	8.52
100s/50s	–/–	0/0	0/1	0/0
Top score	—	1*	60*	29
Balls bowled	220	114	4,205	2,419
Wickets	3	8	128	138
Bowling average	39.66	12.25	17.37	16.53
5 wickets in innings	0	0	2	0
10 wickets in match	0	0	0	0
Best bowling	2/50	3/16	5/18	4/17
Catches/stumpings	0/–	0/–	28/–	34/–
- Source: CricketArchive, 17 October 2023

Kirstie Louise Gordon (born 20 October 1997) is a Scottish cricketer who currently plays for Kent, The Blaze and Trent Rockets as a slow-left arm orthodox bowler. She played for Scotland from 2012 to 2017, before switching nationality to England for the 2018 ICC Women's World Twenty20 tournament. She has previously played for Nottinghamshire, Loughborough Lightning, Birmingham Phoenix and Otago.

== Early life ==
Gordon was born in Huntly, Aberdeenshire, Scotland, on 20 October 1997. As a youngster, she represented the North of Scotland at football and tennis. She began to play junior cricket at school and at Huntly Cricket Club. She progressed to play with the Huntly men's first XI aged 14, taking four wickets on debut.

== Career ==
Gordon made her debut for the Scotland women's national cricket team aged 14 in May 2012, in a Women's County Championship match against Gloucestershire, and established herself as a regular member of the team. In 2014 she was named Scotland's under-17 player, batter and bowler of the year. Her first appearances against international opposition came at the 2015 ICC Women's World Twenty20 Qualifier event.

In 2015, Gordon moved to England to study for a Sports Science and Management degree at Loughborough University, while also playing county cricket for Nottinghamshire Women. This first brought her to the attention of coaches at the Loughborough-based England Women's Academy.

Gordon played for Scotland in the 2017 Women's Cricket World Cup Qualifier in February 2017. In the tournament, she was the highest wicket-taker for Scotland, with eight dismissals.

Gordon was offered a part-time contract as a talent identification player with Loughborough Lightning ahead of the 2018 Women's Cricket Super League season. As this was dependent on her not being classed as an overseas player, she was obliged to give up her qualification to play for Scotland in order to accept. She described her change of national status as a "massive risk". Now eligible to represent England, she was named in the squad for the 2018 ICC Women's World Twenty20 tournament. She made her Women's Twenty20 International (WT20I) debut for England against Bangladesh women on 12 November 2018, taking three wickets for sixteen runs.

The International Cricket Council (ICC) named Gordon as one of the five breakout stars in women's cricket in 2018.

In July 2019, Gordon was named in England's squad for their one-off Test match against Australia, as part of the Women's Ashes. She made her Test debut for England against Australia women on 18 July 2019.

In November 2019, she was named in England's Women's One Day International (WODI) squad for their series against Pakistan. On 18 June 2020, Gordon was named in a squad of 24 players to begin training ahead of international women's fixtures starting in England following the COVID-19 pandemic.

In January 2020, Gordon left Nottinghamshire after four years to sign for Kent. She returned to Loughborough as part of the Lightning squad for the opening rounds of the 2020 Rachael Heyhoe Flint Trophy. In 2021, she was the leading wicket-taker in the Rachael Heyhoe Flint Trophy, with 16 wickets. At the end of the 2021 season, it was announced that Gordon had signed a professional contract with Lightning, having missed out on an England central contract earlier that year. She also played for Birmingham Phoenix in the first season of The Hundred.

In December 2021, Gordon was named in England's A squad for their tour to Australia, with the matches being played alongside the Women's Ashes. In April 2022, she was bought by the Birmingham Phoenix for the 2022 season of The Hundred. In January 2023, Gordon signed for Otago Sparks for the remainder of the Super Smash. In April 2023, it was announced that Gordon had been appointed captain of The Blaze, the new name for Lightning.

In December 2024, Gordon rejoined the Otago Sparks for that season's Super Smash.

In December 2025, Gordon switched international allegiances for a second time and committed to play for Scotland. Having been named in the Scotland squad for the 2026 Women's T20 World Cup, she marked her first appearance back in the team by taking 3/27 from her four overs against the Netherlands in a warm-up match for the tournament on 28 May 2026.

Having captained The Blaze to a domestic trophy treble, Gordon won the 2026 Cricket Media Club Women's Cricket Award.
