= 2021 Birmingham Phoenix season =

Birmingham Phoenix
2021 season
- Coach: Ben Sawyer (women); Daniel Vettori (men)
- Captain: Amy Jones (women); Moeen Ali (men)
- Overseas player: Erin Burns; Katie Mack; Shafali Verma; (women); Finn Allen; David Bedingham; Imran Tahir; Adam Milne; (men)
- Ground(s): Edgbaston
- Women: 3rd
- Men: 2nd
- Most runs: Evelyn Jones: 233 (women); Liam Livingstone: 348 (men)
- Most wickets: Kirstie Gordon: 15 (women); Adam Milne: 12 (men)
- Most catches: Kirstie Gordon: 4 (women); Will Smeed & Imran Tahir: 5 (men)

The 2021 season was Birmingham Phoenix's first season in the newly established competition The Hundred. Both the men's and women's teams performed well in the competition, qualifying for the knockout stages. Both teams, however, lost their knockout games, the women's team losing in the eliminator match and finishing 3rd overall, while the men's team lost in the final, finishing as runners-up.

== Players ==
- **Bold** denotes players with international caps
- Ages given as of 21 August 2021, the date of the first match played in the tournament

=== Women's team ===
No.	Name	Nationality	Date of birth (age)	Batting style	Bowling style	Notes
Batters
2	Katie Mack	Australia	14 September 1993 (aged 27)	Right-handed	Right-arm leg break	Overseas player
10	Phoebe Franklin	England	18 February 1998 (aged 23)	Right-handed	Right-arm medium	
11	Evelyn Jones	England	8 August 1992 (aged 28)	Left-handed	Left-arm medium	
17	**Shafali Verma**	India	28 January 2004 (aged 17)	Right-handed	Right-arm off break	Overseas player
54	Marie Kelly	England	9 February 1996 (aged 25)	Right-handed	Right-arm medium	
—	Ria Fackrell	England	16 September 1999 (aged 21)	Right-handed	Right-arm off break	
All-rounders
29	**Erin Burns**	Australia	22 June 1988 (aged 33)	Right-handed	Right-arm off break	Overseas player
34	**Georgia Elwiss**	England	31 May 1991 (aged 30)	Right-handed	Right-arm fast-medium	
—	Thea Brookes	England	15 February 1993 (aged 28)	Right-handed	Right-arm off break	
Wicket-keepers
40	**Amy Jones**	England	13 June 1993 (aged 28)	Right-handed	—	Captain; Centrally contracted player
79	Gwenan Davies	Wales	12 May 1994 (aged 27)	Left-handed	—	
Pace bowlers
37	Emily Arlott	England	23 February 1998 (aged 23)	Right-handed	Right-arm medium	
95	Issy Wong	England	15 May 2002 (aged 19)	Right-handed	Right-arm fast	
Spin bowlers
9	**Abtaha Maqsood**	Scotland	11 June 1999 (aged 22)	Right-handed	Right-arm leg break	
48	**Kirstie Gordon**	England	20 October 1997 (aged 23)	Right-handed	Slow left-arm orthodox	

=== Men's team ===
No.	Name	Nationality	Date of birth (age)	Batting style	Bowling style	Notes
Batters
8	Miles Hammond	England	11 January 1996 (aged 25)	Left-handed	Right-arm off break	
26	Will Smeed	England	26 October 2001 (aged 19)	Right-handed	Right-arm off break	
32	**Finn Allen**	New Zealand	22 April 1999 (aged 22)	Right-handed	—	Overseas player
45	Daniel Bell-Drummond	England	4 August 1993 (aged 27)	Right-handed	Right-arm medium	
—	David Bedingham	South Africa	22 April 1994 (aged 27)	Right-handed	—	Overseas player; Replacement player
—	Adam Hose	England	25 October 1992 (aged 28)	Right-handed	Right-arm medium	
—	**Dom Sibley**	England	5 September 1995 (aged 25)	Right-handed	Right-arm leg break	Centrally contracted player
All-rounders
13	Benny Howell	England	5 October 1988 (aged 32)	Right-handed	Right-arm medium	
18	**Moeen Ali**	England	18 June 1987 (aged 34)	Left-handed	Right-arm off break	Captain; Local Icon player
23	**Liam Livingstone**	England	4 August 1993 (aged 27)	Right-handed	Right-arm off break	
28	Tom Abell	England	5 March 1994 (aged 27)	Right-handed	Right-arm medium	
Wicket-keepers
12	Chris Benjamin	South Africa	29 April 1999 (aged 22)	Right-handed	—	Replacement player; UK passport
46	Chris Cooke	South Africa	30 May 1986 (aged 35)	Right-handed	—	UK passport
Pace bowlers
7	Tom Helm	England	7 May 1994 (aged 27)	Right-handed	Right-arm fast-medium	
20	**Adam Milne**	New Zealand	13 April 1992 (aged 29)	Right-handed	Right-arm fast	Overseas player
22	Dillon Pennington	England	26 February 1999 (aged 22)	Right-handed	Right-arm fast-medium	Wildcard pick
36	**Pat Brown**	England	23 August 1998 (aged 22)	Right-handed	Right-arm fast-medium	Local Icon player
—	**Chris Woakes**	England	2 March 1989 (aged 32)	Right-handed	Right-arm fast-medium	Centrally contracted player
Spin bowlers
99	**Imran Tahir**	South Africa	27 March 1979 (aged 42)	Right-handed	Right-arm leg break	Overseas player

== Standings ==
advanced to the Final
advanced to the Eliminator

=== Women ===
Pos	Team	Pld	W	L	T	NR	Pts	NRR
1	Southern Brave	8	7	1	0	0	14	1.056
2	Oval Invincibles	8	4	3	0	1	9	0.015
3	Birmingham Phoenix	8	4	4	0	0	8	0.186
4	London Spirit	8	4	4	0	0	8	0.046
5	Manchester Originals	8	3	4	0	1	7	0.016
6	Northern Superchargers	8	3	4	0	1	7	−0.041
7	Trent Rockets	8	3	4	0	1	7	−0.293
8	Welsh Fire	8	2	6	0	0	4	−1.017

Source: ESPN Cricinfo, Sky Sports

=== Men ===
Pos	Team	Pld	W	L	T	NR	Pts	NRR
1	Birmingham Phoenix	8	6	2	0	0	12	1.087
2	Southern Brave	8	5	2	0	1	11	0.034
3	Trent Rockets	8	5	3	0	0	10	0.035
4	Oval Invincibles	8	4	3	0	1	9	0.123
5	Northern Superchargers	8	3	4	0	1	7	0.510
6	Manchester Originals	8	2	4	0	2	6	−0.361
7	Welsh Fire	8	3	5	0	0	6	−0.827
8	London Spirit	8	1	6	0	1	3	−0.641

Source: ESPN Cricinfo, Sky Sports

== League stage ==
=== Women's fixtures ===
==== July ====
23 July 2021	Birmingham Phoenix; 128/6 (100 balls)	v	London Spirit; 132/7 (96 balls)	London Spirit won by 3 wickets
15:00; Scorecard	Birmingham Phoenix; 128/6 (100 balls)	v	London Spirit; 132/7 (96 balls)	Edgbaston, Birmingham; Umpires: Rob Bailey and Jasmine Naeem; Player of the match: Evelyn Jones (Birmingham Phoenix)
15:00; Scorecard	Evelyn Jones 47 (41); Deandra Dottin 2/28 (20 balls)		Naomi Dattani 34 (19); Erin Burns 2/15 (20 balls)	Edgbaston, Birmingham; Umpires: Rob Bailey and Jasmine Naeem; Player of the match: Evelyn Jones (Birmingham Phoenix)
London Spirit won the toss and elected to field.; Points: London Spirit 2, Birmingham Phoenix 0.				Edgbaston, Birmingham; Umpires: Rob Bailey and Jasmine Naeem; Player of the match: Evelyn Jones (Birmingham Phoenix)

25 July 2021	Birmingham Phoenix; 113/9 (100 balls)	v	Manchester Originals; 93/8 (100 balls)	Birmingham Phoenix won by 20 runs
14:30; Scorecard	Birmingham Phoenix; 113/9 (100 balls)	v	Manchester Originals; 93/8 (100 balls)	Old Trafford, Manchester; Umpires: Neil Mallender and Jasmine Naeem; Player of the match: Kirstie Gordon (Birmingham Phoenix)
14:30; Scorecard	Amy Jones 31 (17); Emma Lamb 3/16 (20 balls)		Harmanpreet Kaur 49* (47); Kirstie Gordon 3/14 (20 balls)	Old Trafford, Manchester; Umpires: Neil Mallender and Jasmine Naeem; Player of the match: Kirstie Gordon (Birmingham Phoenix)
Birmingham Phoenix won the toss and elected to bat.; Points: Birmingham Phoenix 2, Manchester Originals 0.				Old Trafford, Manchester; Umpires: Neil Mallender and Jasmine Naeem; Player of the match: Kirstie Gordon (Birmingham Phoenix)

30 July 2021	Birmingham Phoenix; 140/4 (100 balls)	v	Southern Brave; 141/2 (82 balls)	Southern Brave won by 8 wickets
15:00; Scorecard	Birmingham Phoenix; 140/4 (100 balls)	v	Southern Brave; 141/2 (82 balls)	Rose Bowl, Southampton; Umpires: Jasmine Naeem and Russell Warren; Player of the match: Danni Wyatt (Southern Brave)
15:00; Scorecard	Amy Jones 42* (26); Amanda-Jade Wellington 2/16 (20 balls)		Danni Wyatt 69* (40); Erin Burns 1/28 (15 balls)	Rose Bowl, Southampton; Umpires: Jasmine Naeem and Russell Warren; Player of the match: Danni Wyatt (Southern Brave)
Southern Brave won the toss and elected to field.; Points: Southern Brave 2, Birmingham Phoenix 0.				Rose Bowl, Southampton; Umpires: Jasmine Naeem and Russell Warren; Player of the match: Danni Wyatt (Southern Brave)

==== August ====
1 August 2021	Trent Rockets; 145/5 (100 balls)	v	Birmingham Phoenix; 134/9 (100 balls)	Trent Rockets won by 11 runs
11:00; Scorecard	Trent Rockets; 145/5 (100 balls)	v	Birmingham Phoenix; 134/9 (100 balls)	Edgbaston, Birmingham; Umpires: Rob Bailey and Jasmine Naeem; Player of the match: Heather Graham (Trent Rockets)
11:00; Scorecard	Heather Graham 44 (21); Kirstie Gordon 1/20 (20 balls)		Issy Wong 27 (11); Sammy-Jo Johnson 3/28 (20 balls)	Edgbaston, Birmingham; Umpires: Rob Bailey and Jasmine Naeem; Player of the match: Heather Graham (Trent Rockets)
Trent Rockets won the toss and elected to bat.; Points: Trent Rockets 2, Birmingham Phoenix 0.				Edgbaston, Birmingham; Umpires: Rob Bailey and Jasmine Naeem; Player of the match: Heather Graham (Trent Rockets)

4 August 2021	Birmingham Phoenix; 129/9 (100 balls)	v	Oval Invincibles; 133/2 (97 balls)	Oval Invincibles won by 8 wickets
15:30; Scorecard	Birmingham Phoenix; 129/9 (100 balls)	v	Oval Invincibles; 133/2 (97 balls)	Edgbaston, Birmingham; Umpires: Jasmine Naeem and Martin Saggers; Player of the match: Tash Farrant (Oval Invincibles)
15:30; Scorecard	Erin Burns 45 (28); Tash Farrant 3/23 (20 balls)		Dane van Niekerk 67* (51); Kirstie Gordon 2/20 (20 balls)	Edgbaston, Birmingham; Umpires: Jasmine Naeem and Martin Saggers; Player of the match: Tash Farrant (Oval Invincibles)
Birmingham Phoenix won the toss and elected to bat.; Points: Oval Invincibles 2, Birmingham Phoenix 0.				Edgbaston, Birmingham; Umpires: Jasmine Naeem and Martin Saggers; Player of the match: Tash Farrant (Oval Invincibles)

9 August 2021	Welsh Fire; 127/9 (100 balls)	v	Birmingham Phoenix; 131/0 (76 balls)	Birmingham Phoenix won by 10 wickets
15:00; Scorecard	Welsh Fire; 127/9 (100 balls)	v	Birmingham Phoenix; 131/0 (76 balls)	Edgbaston, Birmingham; Umpires: Sarah Bartlett and Russell Warren; Player of the match: Shafali Verma (Birmingham Phoenix)
15:00; Scorecard	Bryony Smith 38 (36); Kirstie Gordon 2/30 (20 balls)		Shafali Verma 76* (42)	Edgbaston, Birmingham; Umpires: Sarah Bartlett and Russell Warren; Player of the match: Shafali Verma (Birmingham Phoenix)
Birmingham Phoenix won the toss and elected to field.; Points: Birmingham Phoenix 2, Welsh Fire 0.				Edgbaston, Birmingham; Umpires: Sarah Bartlett and Russell Warren; Player of the match: Shafali Verma (Birmingham Phoenix)

13 August 2021	Trent Rockets; 125/7 (100 balls)	v	Birmingham Phoenix; 129/7 (94 balls)	Birmingham Phoenix won by 3 wickets
15:30; Scorecard	Trent Rockets; 125/7 (100 balls)	v	Birmingham Phoenix; 129/7 (94 balls)	Trent Bridge, Nottingham; Umpires: Rob Bailey and Jasmine Naeem; Player of the match: Erin Burns (Birmingham Phoenix)
15:30; Scorecard	Abigail Freeborn 30 (23); Kirstie Gordon 3/26 (20 balls)		Erin Burns 38 (26); Sammy-Jo Johnson 3/22 (19 balls)	Trent Bridge, Nottingham; Umpires: Rob Bailey and Jasmine Naeem; Player of the match: Erin Burns (Birmingham Phoenix)
Birmingham Phoenix won the toss and elected to field.; Points: Birmingham Phoenix 2, Trent Rockets 0.				Trent Bridge, Nottingham; Umpires: Rob Bailey and Jasmine Naeem; Player of the match: Erin Burns (Birmingham Phoenix)

17 August 2021	Birmingham Phoenix; 147/4 (100 balls)	v	Northern Superchargers; 133/6 (100 balls)	Birmingham Phoenix won by 14 runs
15:00; Scorecard	Birmingham Phoenix; 147/4 (100 balls)	v	Northern Superchargers; 133/6 (100 balls)	Headingley, Leeds; Umpires: Anna Harris and Steve O'Shaughnessy; Player of the match: Evelyn Jones (Birmingham Phoenix)
15:00; Scorecard	Evelyn Jones 64 (47); Katie Levick 2/23 (20 balls)		Lauren Winfield-Hill 64 (38); Issy Wong 2/23 (20 balls)	Headingley, Leeds; Umpires: Anna Harris and Steve O'Shaughnessy; Player of the match: Evelyn Jones (Birmingham Phoenix)
Northern Superchargers won the toss and elected to field.; Points: Birmingham Phoenix 2, Northern Superchargers 0.				Headingley, Leeds; Umpires: Anna Harris and Steve O'Shaughnessy; Player of the match: Evelyn Jones (Birmingham Phoenix)

=== Men's fixtures ===
==== July ====
23 July 2021	London Spirit; 144/6 (100 balls)	v	Birmingham Phoenix; 148/7 (97 balls)	Birmingham Phoenix won by 3 wickets
18:30; Scorecard	London Spirit; 144/6 (100 balls)	v	Birmingham Phoenix; 148/7 (97 balls)	Edgbaston, Birmingham; Attendance: 12,137; Umpires: Graham Lloyd and Tim Robinson; Player of the match: Zak Crawley (London Spirit)
18:30; Scorecard	Zak Crawley 64 (40); Adam Milne 2/18 (20 balls)		Moeen Ali 40 (30); Mohammad Amir 2/34 (17 balls)	Edgbaston, Birmingham; Attendance: 12,137; Umpires: Graham Lloyd and Tim Robinson; Player of the match: Zak Crawley (London Spirit)
Birmingham Phoenix won the toss and elected to field.; Points: Birmingham Phoenix 2, London Spirit 0.				Edgbaston, Birmingham; Attendance: 12,137; Umpires: Graham Lloyd and Tim Robinson; Player of the match: Zak Crawley (London Spirit)

25 July 2021	Birmingham Phoenix; 87 (84 balls)	v	Manchester Originals; 89/4 (73 balls)	Manchester Originals won by 6 wickets
18:00; Scorecard	Birmingham Phoenix; 87 (84 balls)	v	Manchester Originals; 89/4 (73 balls)	Old Trafford, Manchester; Attendance: 7,855; Umpires: Steve O'Shaughnessy and Alex Wharf; Player of the match: Matt Parkinson (Manchester Originals)
18:00; Scorecard	Moeen Ali 15 (18); Matt Parkinson 4/9 (19 balls)		Jos Buttler 30 (31); Moeen Ali 1/15 (20 balls)	Old Trafford, Manchester; Attendance: 7,855; Umpires: Steve O'Shaughnessy and Alex Wharf; Player of the match: Matt Parkinson (Manchester Originals)
Birmingham Phoenix won the toss and elected to bat.; Points: Manchester Originals 2, Birmingham Phoenix 0.				Old Trafford, Manchester; Attendance: 7,855; Umpires: Steve O'Shaughnessy and Alex Wharf; Player of the match: Matt Parkinson (Manchester Originals)

30 July 2021	Birmingham Phoenix; 151/3 (100 balls)	v	Southern Brave; 152/6 (97 balls)	Southern Brave won by 4 wickets
18:30; Scorecard	Birmingham Phoenix; 151/3 (100 balls)	v	Southern Brave; 152/6 (97 balls)	Rose Bowl, Southampton; Umpires: David Millns and Martin Saggers; Player of the match: James Vince (Southern Brave)
18:30; Scorecard	Liam Livingstone 68* (44); Jake Lintott 2/13 (15 balls)		James Vince 60 (38); Adam Milne 3/15 (20 balls)	Rose Bowl, Southampton; Umpires: David Millns and Martin Saggers; Player of the match: James Vince (Southern Brave)
Southern Brave won the toss and elected to field.; Points: Southern Brave 2, Birmingham Phoenix 0.				Rose Bowl, Southampton; Umpires: David Millns and Martin Saggers; Player of the match: James Vince (Southern Brave)

==== August ====
1 August 2021	Trent Rockets; 144/6 (100 balls)	v	Birmingham Phoenix; 145/4 (74 balls)	Birmingham Phoenix won by 6 wickets
14:30; Scorecard	Trent Rockets; 144/6 (100 balls)	v	Birmingham Phoenix; 145/4 (74 balls)	Edgbaston, Birmingham; Attendance: 17,479; Umpires: Nigel Llong and Steve O'Shaughnessy; Player of the match: Will Smeed (Birmingham Phoenix)
14:30; Scorecard	Dawid Malan 51 (41); Adam Milne 2/13 (20 balls)		Finn Allen 43 (23); Rashid Khan 3/26 (20 balls)	Edgbaston, Birmingham; Attendance: 17,479; Umpires: Nigel Llong and Steve O'Shaughnessy; Player of the match: Will Smeed (Birmingham Phoenix)
Birmingham Phoenix won the toss and elected to field.; Points: Birmingham Phoenix 2, Trent Rockets 0.				Edgbaston, Birmingham; Attendance: 17,479; Umpires: Nigel Llong and Steve O'Shaughnessy; Player of the match: Will Smeed (Birmingham Phoenix)

4 August 2021	Oval Invincibles; 172/3 (100 balls)	v	Birmingham Phoenix; 174/4 (94 balls)	Birmingham Phoenix won by 6 wickets
19:00; Scorecard	Oval Invincibles; 172/3 (100 balls)	v	Birmingham Phoenix; 174/4 (94 balls)	Edgbaston, Birmingham; Umpires: Peter Hartley and Russell Warren; Player of the match: Chris Benjamin (Birmingham Phoenix)
19:00; Scorecard	Colin Ingram 81* (43); Pat Brown 2/34 (20 balls)		Moeen Ali 49 (26); Saqib Mahmood 2/34 (20 balls)	Edgbaston, Birmingham; Umpires: Peter Hartley and Russell Warren; Player of the match: Chris Benjamin (Birmingham Phoenix)
Birmingham Phoenix won the toss and elected to field.; Points: Birmingham Phoenix 2, Oval Invincibles 0.				Edgbaston, Birmingham; Umpires: Peter Hartley and Russell Warren; Player of the match: Chris Benjamin (Birmingham Phoenix)

9 August 2021	Birmingham Phoenix; 184/5 (100 balls)	v	Welsh Fire; 91 (74 balls)	Birmingham Phoenix won by 93 runs
18:30; Scorecard	Birmingham Phoenix; 184/5 (100 balls)	v	Welsh Fire; 91 (74 balls)	Edgbaston, Birmingham; Umpires: Steve O'Shaughnessy and Tim Robinson; Player of the match: Imran Tahir (Birmingham Phoenix)
18:30; Scorecard	Will Smeed 65* (38); David Payne 3/38 (20 balls)		Ian Cockbain 32 (25); Imran Tahir 5/25 (19 balls)	Edgbaston, Birmingham; Umpires: Steve O'Shaughnessy and Tim Robinson; Player of the match: Imran Tahir (Birmingham Phoenix)
Welsh Fire won the toss and elected to field.; Imran Tahir (Birmingham Phoenix) took a hat-trick.; Points: Birmingham Phoenix 2, Welsh Fire 0.				Edgbaston, Birmingham; Umpires: Steve O'Shaughnessy and Tim Robinson; Player of the match: Imran Tahir (Birmingham Phoenix)

13 August 2021	Birmingham Phoenix; 166/6 (100 balls)	v	Trent Rockets; 150/9 (100 balls)	Birmingham Phoenix won by 16 runs
19:00; Scorecard	Birmingham Phoenix; 166/6 (100 balls)	v	Trent Rockets; 150/9 (100 balls)	Trent Bridge, Nottingham; Umpires: Peter Hartley and David Millns; Player of the match: Liam Livingstone (Birmingham Phoenix)
19:00; Scorecard	Liam Livingstone 50 (31); Sam Cook 2/32 (20 balls)		Steven Mullaney 49 (33); Pat Brown 3/27 (20 balls)	Trent Bridge, Nottingham; Umpires: Peter Hartley and David Millns; Player of the match: Liam Livingstone (Birmingham Phoenix)
Trent Rockets won the toss and elected to field.; Points: Birmingham Phoenix 2, Trent Rockets 0.				Trent Bridge, Nottingham; Umpires: Peter Hartley and David Millns; Player of the match: Liam Livingstone (Birmingham Phoenix)

17 August 2021	Northern Superchargers; 143/8 (100 balls)	v	Birmingham Phoenix; 147/2 (74 balls)	Birmingham Phoenix won by 8 wickets
18:30; Scorecard	Northern Superchargers; 143/8 (100 balls)	v	Birmingham Phoenix; 147/2 (74 balls)	Headingley, Leeds; Umpires: Neil Mallender and Russell Warren; Player of the match: Liam Livingstone (Birmingham Phoenix)
18:30; Scorecard	Tom Kohler-Cadmore 71 (44); Liam Livingstone 3/25 (20 balls)		Liam Livingstone 92* (40); David Willey 1/26 (10 balls)	Headingley, Leeds; Umpires: Neil Mallender and Russell Warren; Player of the match: Liam Livingstone (Birmingham Phoenix)
Birmingham Phoenix won the toss and elected to field.; Points: Birmingham Phoenix 2, Northern Superchargers 0.				Headingley, Leeds; Umpires: Neil Mallender and Russell Warren; Player of the match: Liam Livingstone (Birmingham Phoenix)

== Knockout stages ==
=== Women ===
After finishing in third position after the group stage, the women's team qualified for the eliminator against second placed Oval Invincibles. They lost the match and did not progress to the final.

20 August 2021
15:00
Scorecard

Oval Invincibles; 114/7 (100 balls)	v	Birmingham Phoenix; 94 (94 balls)
Marizanne Kapp 37 (37); Kirstie Gordon 2/22 (20 balls)		Amy Jones 35 (25); Tash Farrant 4/10 (19 balls)

Oval Invincibles won by 20 runs
The Oval, London
Umpires: Rob Bailey and Anna Harris
Player of the match: Tash Farrant (Oval Invincibles)

- Birmingham Phoenix won the toss and elected to field.

=== Men ===
The men's team finished first in the group stage and, as a result, qualified directly for the final against Southern Brave. They lost the final by 32 runs.

21 August 2021
18:30 (D/N)
Scorecard

Southern Brave; 168/5 (100 balls)	v	Birmingham Phoenix; 136/5 (100 balls)
Paul Stirling 61 (36); Adam Milne 2/8 (20 balls)		Liam Livingstone 46 (19); Tymal Mills 1/13 (20 balls)

Southern Brave won by 32 runs
Lord's, London
Umpires: Martin Saggers and Alex Wharf
Player of the match: Paul Stirling (Southern Brave)

- Birmingham Phoenix won the toss and elected to field.
