= List of Birmingham Phoenix cricketers =

Birmingham Phoenix were formed in 2019, and played their first Hundred match in the 2021 season of The Hundred against London Spirit for both the Men's team and the Women's team. Hundred matches are classed as Twenty20 matches and so have Twenty20 status or Women's Twenty20 status. The players in this list have all played at least one Hundred match for the Birmingham Phoenix Men's or Women's team.

Players are listed in order of appearance, where players made their debut in the same match, they are ordered by batting order. Players in Bold were overseas players for the Birmingham Phoenix.

== Key ==
**General**

- ♠ – Captain
- † – Wicket-keeper
- **First** – Year of debut for Birmingham Phoenix
- **Last** – Year of latest match played for Birmingham Phoenix
- **Mat** – Number of matches played for Birmingham Phoenix
- **Win%** – Winning percentage

**Batting**

- **Inn** – Number of innings batted
- **NO** – Number of innings not out
- **Runs** – Runs scored in career
- **HS** – Highest score
- **100** – Centuries scored
- **50** – Half-centuries scored
- **Avg** – Runs scored per dismissal
- * – Batsman remained not out

**Bowling**

- **Balls** – Balls bowled in career
- **Wkt** – Wickets taken in career
- **BBI** – Best bowling in an innings
- **BBM** – Best bowling in a match
- **Ave** – Average runs per wicket

**Fielding**

- **Ca** – Catches taken
- **St** – Stumpings effected

== List of players ==
=== Women's players ===
No.	Name	Nationality	First	Last	Mat	Runs	HS	Avg	Balls	Wkt	BBI	Ave	Ca	St
No.	Name	Nationality	First	Last	Mat	Batting			Bowling				Fielding	
1	**Katie Mack**	Australia	2021	2021	9	100	31	12.50	0	0	–	–	3	0
2	**Shafali Verma**	India	2021	2021	8	171	76*	24.42	0	0	–	–	2	0
3	Eve Jones ♠	England	2021	2023	22	411	64	20.55	5	1	1/7	5.00	4	0
4	Em Arlott	England	2021	2025	36	226	32*	13.29	576	45	3/15	15.98	7	0
5	Amy Jones ♠†	England	2021	2025	38	634	51	20.45	0	0	–	–	20	14
6	**Erin Burns**	Australia	2021	2023	16	234	45	16.71	235	9	2/15	30.22	4	0
7	Georgia Elwiss	England	2021	2022	14	88	32	12.57	236	10	2/16	31.90	4	0
8	Issy Wong	England	2021	2024	23	139	27	9.26	272	10	2/23	37.90	2	0
9	Gwenan Davies	Wales	2021	2022	13	56	20	9.33	0	0	–	–	4	0
10	Kirstie Gordon	Scotland	2021	2022	15	28	11*	14.00	255	17	3/14	19.41	6	0
11	Abtaha Maqsood	Scotland	2021	2023	15	5	2*	5.00	200	6	2/14	43.66	0	0
12	Phoebe Franklin	England	2021	2022	5	17	7	8.50	40	1	1/20	79.00	3	0
13	Marie Kelly	England	2021	2025	9	66	23*	9.43	0	0	–	–	5	0
14	**Sophie Devine** ♠	New Zealand	2022	2024	19	411	53	21.63	164	3	1/18	85.00	5	0
15	**Ellyse Perry** ♠	Australia	2022	2026	29	768	68*	34.90	195	10	3/21	28.50	18	0
16	**Sophie Molineux**	Australia	2022	2022	6	65	29*	34.25	112	5	2/11	21.80	2	0
17	Ria Fackrell	England	2022	2022	1	2	2	2.00	20	1	1/19	19.00	0	0
18	**Tess Flintoff**	Australia	2023	2023	7	89	55	14.83	90	3	1/10	41.33	1	0
19	Abbey Freeborn	England	2023	2023	7	43	14	10.75	0	0	–	–	1	0
20	Charis Pavely	England	2023	2024	11	24	8	12.00	160	10	3/21	20.30	2	0
21	Hannah Baker	England	2023	2025	22	7	2*	1.40	358	18	2/18	26.11	3	0
22	Katie Levick	England	2023	2024	15	6	2*	2.00	269	21	3/24	14.90	0	0
23	Sterre Kalis	Netherlands	2023	2025	20	405	55	31.15	0	0	–	–	4	0
24	Chloe Brewer	England	2023	2023	1	–	–	–	10	0	–	–	0	0
25	**Suzie Bates**	New Zealand	2024	2024	3	12	6	6.00	0	0	–	–	3	0
26	Seren Smale	England	2024	2024	8	30	16	7.50	0	0	–	–	1	0
27	Fran Wilson	England	2024	2024	6	24	14	8.00	0	0	–	–	2	0
28	**Richa Ghosh**	India	2024	2024	5	62	41	15.50	0	0	–	–	1	0
29	**Georgia Voll**	Australia	2025	2025	8	111	29	13.88	75	1	1/12	120.00	2	0
30	Emma Lamb	England	2025	2026	12	311	56*	28.27	30	0	–	–	3	0
31	Ailsa Lister	Scotland	2025	2025	8	76	33*	13.20	0	0	–	–	8	0
32	**Megan Schutt**	Australia	2025	2025	8	19	9	6.33	155	12	3/14	15.17	1	0
33	Millie Taylor	England	2025	2025	4	1	1*	–	74	3	1/22	32.66	1	0
34	Mary Taylor	England	2025	2025	2	6	4	3.00	40	0	–	–	0	0
35	Phoebe Brett	England	2025	2026	4	–	–	–	60	5	3/19	9.20	1	0
36	Bethan Ellis	England	2025	2025	1	1	1*	–	0	0	–	–	0	0
37	Davina Perrin	England	2026	2026	7	111	52	15.85	0	0	–	–	2	0
38	Tammy Beaumont	England	2026	2026	6	69	24	11.50	0	0	–	–	2	0
39	Alice Capsey	England	2026	2026	7	79	51	11.28	90	5	2/24	28.80	4	0
40	**Annerie Dercksen**	South Africa	2026	2026	7	40	21	8.00	5	0	–	–	0	0
41	Jemima Spence †	England	2026	2026	7	9	6*	1.80	0	0	–	–	2	0
42	**Kayla Reyneke**	South Africa	2026	2026	1	0	0	0.00	0	0	–	–	0	0
43	**Alana King**	Australia	2026	2026	7	8	5	2.66	123	5	2/18	34.20	1	0
44	Eva Gray	England	2026	2026	4	6	6	6.00	50	2	2/29	39.00	0	0
45	Linsey Smith	England	2026	2026	6	6	4	6.00	85	2	1/25	68.00	1	0
46	Lauren Filer	England	2026	2026	7	1	1*	–	116	4	1/17	38.50	0	0
47	**Fatima Sana**	Pakistan	2026	2026	6	57	36	19.00	85	3	1/12	37.66	3	0

=== Men's players ===
No.	Name	Nationality	First	Last	Mat	Runs	HS	Avg	Balls	Wkt	BBI	Ave	Ca	St
No.	Name	Nationality	First	Last	Mat	Batting			Bowling				Fielding	
1	**Finn Allen**	New Zealand	2021	2021	8	165	43	20.62	0	0	–	–	4	0
2	Miles Hammond	England	2021	2022	16	232	44*	23.20	0	0	–	–	3	0
3	Liam Livingstone ♠	England	2021	2025	38	996	92*	34.34	278	16	3/25	25.62	12	0
4	Moeen Ali ♠	England	2021	2024	30	635	60	22.67	261	12	2/13	29.91	12	0
5	Daniel Bell-Drummond	England	2021	2021	3	32	12	10.66	0	0	–	–	0	0
6	Chris Benjamin †	South Africa	2021	2023	21	208	37*	17.33	0	0	–	–	9	0
7	Benny Howell ♠	England	2021	2025	41	285	24*	15.83	651	40	3/18	20.05	14	0
8	Chris Cooke †	South Africa	2021	2021	4	20	11	6.66	0	0	–	–	1	1
9	**Adam Milne**	New Zealand	2021	2025	32	56	13	9.33	513	37	4/20	17.13	10	0
10	Tom Helm	England	2021	2026	23	54	17	7.71	328	24	4/17	22.95	5	0
11	**Imran Tahir**	South Africa	2021	2022	15	6	6*	6.00	259	12	5/25	32.25	6	0
12	Will Smeed	England	2021	2026	35	667	101*	20.21	0	0	–	–	15	0
13	Pat Brown	England	2021	2021	6	–	–	–	85	6	3/27	27.83	0	0
14	Dillon Pennington	England	2021	2021	3	–	–	–	40	2	2/11	35.50	4	0
15	Tom Abell	England	2021	2021	1	8	8*	–	0	0	–	–	1	0
16	**David Bedingham**	South Africa	2021	2021	1	0	0	0.00	0	0	–	–	1	0
17	Dan Mousley	England	2022	2025	21	164	39	9.64	88	6	3/9	22.50	11	0
18	Graeme van Buuren	South Africa	2022	2022	1	1	1*	–	10	0	–	–	1	0
19	**Kane Richardson**	Australia	2022	2023	14	23	9*	7.66	209	19	4/32	15.78	3	0
20	**Matthew Wade** †	Australia	2022	2022	7	174	81	29.00	0	0	–	–	2	0
21	Henry Brookes	England	2022	2022	6	4	2*	4.00	95	6	5/25	26.50	6	0
22	Timm van der Gugten	Netherlands	2022	2022	1	–	–	–	10	0	–	–	0	0
23	Brett D'Oliveira	England	2022	2022	2	10	8	5.00	10	0	–	–	0	0
24	**Ben Dwarshuis**	Australia	2022	2026	5	5	4	1.66	90	5	2/18	23.20	1	0
25	Sol Budinger	England	2022	2022	1	0	0	0.00	0	0	–	–	0	0
26	**Tanveer Sangha**	Australia	2022	2023	4	15	13*	–	70	5	3/15	16.40	0	0
27	Jacob Bethell	England	2023	2025	18	288	48	24.00	44	3	2/22	25.33	11	0
28	Ben Duckett	England	2023	2025	22	562	92	33.05	0	0	–	–	7	0
29	Jamie Smith †	England	2023	2024	12	228	60	20.72	0	0	–	–	7	3
30	**Shadab Khan**	Pakistan	2023	2023	3	6	4	2.00	35	1	1/16	55.00	1	0
31	Chris Woakes	England	2023	2023	3	20	16*	10.00	55	2	1/21	35.50	0	0
32	Rishi Patel	England	2024	2024	2	28	25	14.00	0	0	–	–	0	0
33	Aneurin Donald †	England	2024	2025	6	24	7	4.00	0	0	–	–	0	0
34	**Sean Abbott**	Australia	2024	2024	9	19	11	9.50	155	11	4/14	18.54	3	0
35	**Tim Southee**	New Zealand	2024	2025	15	11	8	11.00	255	17	5/12	21.05	6	0
36	James Fuller	England	2024	2024	1	6	6	6.00	4	0	–	–	0	0
37	Louis Kimber	England	2024	2025	6	34	14	8.50	0	0	–	–	0	0
38	Chris Wood	England	2024	2026	14	5	5	5.00	220	16	2/11	17.68	2	0
39	Joe Clarke †	England	2025	2026	16	520	73	32.50	0	0	–	–	6	2
40	**Trent Boult**	New Zealand	2025	2025	8	19	11*	19.00	130	6	2/20	30.00	0	0
41	Liam Patterson-White	England	2025	2025	2	1	1	1.00	40	3	2/25	14.33	0	0
42	Rehan Ahmed	England	2026	2026	8	105	48	15.00	115	7	3/25	27.00	2	0
43	**Donovan Ferreira** ♠	South Africa	2026	2026	8	101	23	16.83	40	0	–	–	6	0
44	**Mitchell Owen**	Australia	2026	2026	8	81	18	10.12	30	3	1/4	25.33	5	0
45	Sean Dickson	South Africa	2026	2026	8	158	51*	39.50	0	0	–	–	2	0
46	Laurie Evans †	England	2026	2026	7	58	19	9.66	0	0	–	–	1	0
47	Scott Currie	Scotland	2026	2026	5	36	17	12.00	81	3	2/40	50.66	3	0
48	Saqib Mahmood	England	2026	2026	7	2	2*	1.00	115	3	1/32	77.33	1	0
49	**Usman Tariq**	Pakistan	2026	2026	7	4	2*	4.00	135	6	2/15	26.83	0	0
50	Jordan Thompson	England	2026	2026	3	48	25*	–	45	3	1/24	28.66	1	0
51	Joe Weatherley	England	2026	2026	2	48	42	24.00	0	0	–	–	3	0

== See also ==
- Birmingham Phoenix
- The Hundred
