= 2022 Birmingham Phoenix season =

Birmingham Phoenix
2022 season
- Coach: Ben Sawyer (women); Daniel Vettori (men)
- Captain: Sophie Devine (women); Moeen Ali (men)
- Overseas player: Sophie Devine; Sophie Molineux; Ellyse Perry; (women); Deepti Sharma; Ben Dwarshuis; Imran Tahir; Adam Milne; Kane Richardson; Tanveer Sangha; Matthew Wade; (men)
- Ground(s): Edgbaston
- Women: 4th
- Men: 4th
- Most runs: Ellyse Perry: 134 (women); Will Smeed: 179 (men)
- Most wickets: Emily Arlott: 9 (women); Tom Helm: 14 (men)

The 2022 season was Birmingham Phoenix's second season of the 100 ball franchise cricket, The Hundred. The season was positive overall for the franchise as both teams performed well, with each missing out on progressing to the knockout stages only due to their net run rate.

== Players ==
- **Bold** denotes players with international caps
- Ages are given as of 3 August 2022, the date of the first match of the tournament

=== Women's team ===
No.	Name	Nationality	Date of birth (age)	Batting style	Bowling style	Notes
Batters
10	Phoebe Franklin	England	18 February 1998 (aged 24)	Right-handed	Right-arm medium	
11	Evelyn Jones	England	8 August 1992 (aged 29)	Left-handed	Left-arm medium	
16	Ria Fackrell	England	16 September 1999 (aged 22)	Right-handed	Right-arm off break	
—	Davina Perrin	England	8 September 2006 (aged 15)	Right-handed	Right-arm leg break	
All-rounders
8	**Ellyse Perry**	Australia	3 November 1990 (aged 31)	Right-handed	Right-arm fast-medium	Overseas player
34	**Georgia Elwiss**	England	31 May 1991 (aged 31)	Right-handed	Right-arm fast-medium	
77	**Sophie Devine**	New Zealand	1 September 1989 (aged 32)	Right-handed	Right-arm medium	Captain; Overseas player
—	**Sterre Kalis**	Netherlands	30 August 1999 (aged 22)	Right-handed	Right-arm medium	
—	**Deepti Sharma**	India	24 August 1997 (aged 24)	Left-handed	Right-arm off break	Overseas player
Wicket-keepers
40	**Amy Jones**	England	13 June 1993 (aged 29)	Right-handed	—	Centrally contracted player
79	Gwenan Davies	Wales	12 May 1994 (aged 28)	Left-handed	—	
Pace bowlers
37	Emily Arlott	England	23 February 1998 (aged 24)	Right-handed	Right-arm medium	
95	**Issy Wong**	England	15 May 2002 (aged 20)	Right-handed	Right-arm fast	
Spin bowlers
9	**Abtaha Maqsood**	Scotland	11 June 1999 (aged 23)	Right-handed	Right-arm leg break	
23	**Sophie Molineux**	Australia	17 January 1998 (aged 24)	Left-handed	Slow left-arm orthodox	Overseas player
48	**Kirstie Gordon**	England	20 October 1997 (aged 24)	Right-handed	Slow left-arm orthodox	

=== Men's team ===
No.	Name	Nationality	Date of birth (age)	Batting style	Bowling style	Notes
Batters
8	Miles Hammond	England	11 January 1996 (aged 26)	Left-handed	Right-arm off break	
26	Will Smeed	England	26 October 2001 (aged 20)	Right-handed	Right-arm off break	
28	Tom Abell	England	5 March 1994 (aged 28)	Right-handed	Right-arm medium	Ruled out through injury
80	Dan Mousley	England	8 July 2001 (aged 21)	Left-handed	Slow left-arm orthodox	Wildcard player
—	Sol Budinger	England	21 August 1999 (aged 22)	Left-handed	Right-arm off break	Replacement player
All-rounders
2	Graeme van Buuren	South Africa	22 August 1990 (aged 31)	Right-handed	Slow left-arm orthodox	UK passport
9	Brett D'Oliveira	England	28 February 1992 (aged 30)	Right-handed	Right-arm leg break	Replacement player
13	Benny Howell	England	5 October 1988 (aged 33)	Right-handed	Right-arm medium	
18	**Moeen Ali**	England	18 June 1987 (aged 35)	Left-handed	Right-arm off break	Captain
23	**Liam Livingstone**	England	4 August 1993 (aged 28)	Right-handed	Right-arm off break	Ruled out through injury
Wicket-keepers
12	Chris Benjamin	South Africa	29 April 1999 (aged 23)	Right-handed	—	UK passport
64	**Matthew Wade**	Australia	26 December 1987 (aged 34)	Left-handed	—	Overseas player
Pace bowlers
7	Tom Helm	England	7 May 1994 (aged 28)	Right-handed	Right-arm fast-medium	Replacement player
10	Henry Brookes	England	21 August 1999 (aged 22)	Right-handed	Right-arm fast-medium	
20	**Adam Milne**	New Zealand	13 April 1992 (aged 30)	Right-handed	Right-arm fast	Overseas player; Ruled out through injury
27	**Ben Dwarshuis**	Australia	23 June 1994 (aged 28)	Left-handed	Left-arm fast-medium	Overseas player; Replacement player
55	**Kane Richardson**	Australia	12 February 1991 (aged 31)	Right-handed	Right-arm fast-medium	Overseas player
63	**Timm van der Gugten**	Netherlands	25 February 1991 (aged 31)	Right-handed	Right-arm fast-medium	Replacement player
—	**Matthew Fisher**	England	9 November 1997 (aged 24)	Right-handed	Right-arm fast-medium	Ruled out through injury
—	**Olly Stone**	England	9 October 1993 (aged 28)	Right-handed	Right-arm fast	Ruled out through injury
—	**Chris Woakes**	England	2 March 1989 (aged 33)	Right-handed	Right-arm fast-medium	Centrally contracted player; Ruled out through injury
Spin bowlers
17	Tanveer Sangha	Australia	26 November 2001 (aged 20)	Right-handed	Right-arm leg break	Overseas player; Replacement player
99	**Imran Tahir**	South Africa	27 March 1979 (aged 43)	Right-handed	Right-arm leg break	Overseas player; Ruled out
—	**Jack Leach**	England	22 June 1991 (aged 31)	Left-handed	Slow left-arm orthodox	Centrally contracted player

== Standings ==
advanced to the final
advanced to the eliminator

=== Women ===
Pos	Team	Pld	W	L	T	NR	Pts	NRR
1	Oval Invincibles	6	5	1	0	0	10	1.098
2	Southern Brave	6	5	1	0	0	10	0.806
3	Trent Rockets	6	3	3	0	0	6	0.101
4	Birmingham Phoenix	6	3	3	0	0	6	−0.031
5	Northern Superchargers	6	3	3	0	0	6	−0.119
6	Manchester Originals	6	2	4	0	0	4	−0.478
7	London Spirit	6	2	4	0	0	4	−0.557
8	Welsh Fire	6	1	5	0	0	2	−0.681

Source: BBC Sport, ESPN Cricinfo

=== Men ===
Pos	Team	Pld	W	L	T	NR	Pts	NRR
1	Trent Rockets	8	6	2	0	0	12	0.576
2	Manchester Originals	8	5	3	0	0	10	0.908
3	London Spirit	8	5	3	0	0	10	0.338
4	Birmingham Phoenix	8	5	3	0	0	10	−0.172
5	Oval Invincibles	8	4	4	0	0	8	0.385
6	Northern Superchargers	8	4	4	0	0	8	0.009
7	Southern Brave	8	3	5	0	0	6	−0.593
8	Welsh Fire	8	0	8	0	0	0	−1.442

Source: BBC Sport, ESPN Cricinfo

== League stage ==
=== Women's fixtures ===
Due to the shortened women's competition, Birmingham Phoenix did not play against Southern Brave

13 August 2022	Birmingham Phoenix; 161/5 (100 balls)	v	Welsh Fire (H); 142/5 (100 overs)	Birmingham Phoenix won by 19 runs
14:30; Scorecard	Birmingham Phoenix; 161/5 (100 balls)	v	Welsh Fire (H); 142/5 (100 overs)	Sophia Gardens, Cardiff; Umpires: Ian Blackwell (Eng) and Claire Polosak (Aus); Player of the match: Ellyse Perry (Birmingham Phoenix)
14:30; Scorecard	Ellyse Perry 58 (31); Claire Nicholas 2/26 (20 balls)		Tammy Beaumont 39 (34); Georgia Elwiss 2/29 (20 balls)	Sophia Gardens, Cardiff; Umpires: Ian Blackwell (Eng) and Claire Polosak (Aus); Player of the match: Ellyse Perry (Birmingham Phoenix)
Welsh Fire won the toss and elected to field.; Points: Birmingham Phoenix 2, Welsh Fire 0.				Sophia Gardens, Cardiff; Umpires: Ian Blackwell (Eng) and Claire Polosak (Aus); Player of the match: Ellyse Perry (Birmingham Phoenix)

15 August 2022	Trent Rockets; 116/9 (100 balls)	v	Birmingham Phoenix (H); 117/2 (91 balls)	Birmingham Phoenix won by 8 wickets
15:00; Scorecard	Trent Rockets; 116/9 (100 balls)	v	Birmingham Phoenix (H); 117/2 (91 balls)	Edgbaston, Birmingham; Umpires: Paul Baldwin (Eng) and Anna Harris (Eng); Player of the match: Amy Jones (Birmingham Phoenix)
15:00; Scorecard	Elyse Villani 33 (25); Emily Arlott 3/19 (20 balls)		Amy Jones 44* (32); Alana King 1/18 (20 balls)	Edgbaston, Birmingham; Umpires: Paul Baldwin (Eng) and Anna Harris (Eng); Player of the match: Amy Jones (Birmingham Phoenix)
Birmingham Phoenix won the toss and elected to field.; Points: Birmingham Phoenix 2, Trent Rockets 0.				Edgbaston, Birmingham; Umpires: Paul Baldwin (Eng) and Anna Harris (Eng); Player of the match: Amy Jones (Birmingham Phoenix)

19 August 2022	(H) Birmingham Phoenix; 153/4 (100 balls)	v	Northern Superchargers; 148/5 (100 balls)	Birmingham Phoenix won by 5 runs
15:30; Scorecard	(H) Birmingham Phoenix; 153/4 (100 balls)	v	Northern Superchargers; 148/5 (100 balls)	Edgbaston, Birmingham; Umpires: Paul Baldwin (Eng) and Anna Harris (Eng); Player of the match: Sophie Molineux (Birmingham Phoenix)
15:30; Scorecard	Amy Jones 48 (28); Alice Davidson-Richards 3/30 (20 balls)		Alyssa Healy 46 (28); Sophie Molineux 2/11 (20 balls)	Edgbaston, Birmingham; Umpires: Paul Baldwin (Eng) and Anna Harris (Eng); Player of the match: Sophie Molineux (Birmingham Phoenix)
Northern Superchargers won the toss and elected to field.; Points: Birmingham Phoenix 2, Northern Superchargers 0.				Edgbaston, Birmingham; Umpires: Paul Baldwin (Eng) and Anna Harris (Eng); Player of the match: Sophie Molineux (Birmingham Phoenix)

23 August 2022	Birmingham Phoenix; 106/7 (100 balls)	v	Oval Invincibles (H); 107/2 (87 balls)	Oval Invincibles won by 8 wickets
15:00; Scorecard	Birmingham Phoenix; 106/7 (100 balls)	v	Oval Invincibles (H); 107/2 (87 balls)	The Oval, London; Umpires: Paul Baldwin (Eng) and Sarah Bartlett (Eng); Player of the match: Alice Capsey (Oval Invincibles)
15:00; Scorecard	Evelyn Jones 29 (29); Alice Capsey 3/15 (20 balls)		Lauren Winfield-Hill 41* (38); Emily Arlott 1/8 (17 balls)	The Oval, London; Umpires: Paul Baldwin (Eng) and Sarah Bartlett (Eng); Player of the match: Alice Capsey (Oval Invincibles)
Oval Invincibles won the toss and elected to field.; Points: Oval Invincibles 2, Birmingham Phoenix 0.				The Oval, London; Umpires: Paul Baldwin (Eng) and Sarah Bartlett (Eng); Player of the match: Alice Capsey (Oval Invincibles)

28 August 2022	Manchester Originals; 122/6 (100 balls)	v	Birmingham Phoenix (H); 104 (100 balls)	Manchester Originals won by 18 runs
15:30; Scorecard	Manchester Originals; 122/6 (100 balls)	v	Birmingham Phoenix (H); 104 (100 balls)	Edgbaston, Birmingham; Umpires: Jasmine Naeem (Eng) and Chris Watts (Eng); Player of the match: Sophie Ecclestone (Manchester Originals)
15:30; Scorecard	Emma Lamb 30 (21); Emily Arlott 2/17 (20 balls)		Georgia Elwiss 32 (25); Sophie Ecclestone 3/8 (20 balls)	Edgbaston, Birmingham; Umpires: Jasmine Naeem (Eng) and Chris Watts (Eng); Player of the match: Sophie Ecclestone (Manchester Originals)
Birmingham Phoenix won the toss and elected to field.; Points: Manchester Originals 2, Birmingham Phoenix 0.				Edgbaston, Birmingham; Umpires: Jasmine Naeem (Eng) and Chris Watts (Eng); Player of the match: Sophie Ecclestone (Manchester Originals)

30 August 2022	Birmingham Phoenix; 82 (94 balls)	v	London Spirit (H); 83/6 (97 balls)	London Spirit won by 4 wickets
15:00; Scorecard	Birmingham Phoenix; 82 (94 balls)	v	London Spirit (H); 83/6 (97 balls)	Lord's, London; Umpires: Ben Debenham (Eng) and Anna Harris (Eng); Player of the match: Naomi Dattani (London Spirit)
15:00; Scorecard	Evelyn Jones 24 (30); Danielle Gibson 2/12 (15 balls)		Naomi Dattani 28* (29); Emily Arlott 2/9 (20 balls)	Lord's, London; Umpires: Ben Debenham (Eng) and Anna Harris (Eng); Player of the match: Naomi Dattani (London Spirit)
London Spirit won the toss and elected to field.; Points: London Spirit 2, Birmingham Phoenix 0.				Lord's, London; Umpires: Ben Debenham (Eng) and Anna Harris (Eng); Player of the match: Naomi Dattani (London Spirit)

=== Men's fixtures ===
6 August 2022	Birmingham Phoenix; 143/7 (100 balls)	v	Trent Rockets (H); 147/4 (97 balls)	Trent Rockets won by 6 wickets
14:30; Scorecard	Birmingham Phoenix; 143/7 (100 balls)	v	Trent Rockets (H); 147/4 (97 balls)	Trent Bridge, Nottingham; Umpires: Peter Hartley (Eng) and Steve O'Shaughnessy (Eng); Player of the match: Alex Hales (Trent Rockets)
14:30; Scorecard	Liam Livingstone 47 (28); Daniel Sams 3/24 (20 balls)		Alex Hales 58 (41); Tom Helm 2/11 (12 balls)	Trent Bridge, Nottingham; Umpires: Peter Hartley (Eng) and Steve O'Shaughnessy (Eng); Player of the match: Alex Hales (Trent Rockets)
Trent Rockets won the toss and elected to field.; Points: Trent Rockets 2, Birmingham Phoenix 0.				Trent Bridge, Nottingham; Umpires: Peter Hartley (Eng) and Steve O'Shaughnessy (Eng); Player of the match: Alex Hales (Trent Rockets)

10 August 2022	(H) Birmingham Phoenix; 176/4 (100 balls)	v	Southern Brave; 123 (85 balls)	Birmingham Phoenix won by 53 runs
18:30; Scorecard	(H) Birmingham Phoenix; 176/4 (100 balls)	v	Southern Brave; 123 (85 balls)	Edgbaston, Birmingham; Umpires: Nick Cook (Eng) and Peter Hartley (Eng); Player of the match: Will Smeed (Birmingham Phoenix)
18:30; Scorecard	Will Smeed 101* (50); Marcus Stoinis 1/12 (10 balls)		Alex Davies 33 (24); Henry Brookes 5/25 (20 balls)	Edgbaston, Birmingham; Umpires: Nick Cook (Eng) and Peter Hartley (Eng); Player of the match: Will Smeed (Birmingham Phoenix)
Southern Brave won the toss and elected to field.; Points: Birmingham Phoenix 2, Southern Brave 0.				Edgbaston, Birmingham; Umpires: Nick Cook (Eng) and Peter Hartley (Eng); Player of the match: Will Smeed (Birmingham Phoenix)

13 August 2022	Birmingham Phoenix; 130/7 (100 balls)	v	Welsh Fire (H); 126/5 (100 balls)	Birmingham Phoenix won by 4 runs
18:00; Scorecard	Birmingham Phoenix; 130/7 (100 balls)	v	Welsh Fire (H); 126/5 (100 balls)	Sophia Gardens, Cardiff; Umpires: Peter Hartley (Eng) and Russell Warren (Eng); Player of the match: Kane Richardson (Birmingham Phoenix)
18:00; Scorecard	Matthew Wade 38 (30); David Payne 2/12 (15 balls)		Tom Banton 44 (32); Kane Richardson 2/15 (20 balls)	Sophia Gardens, Cardiff; Umpires: Peter Hartley (Eng) and Russell Warren (Eng); Player of the match: Kane Richardson (Birmingham Phoenix)
Welsh Fire won the toss and elected to field.; Points: Birmingham Phoenix 2, Welsh Fire 0.				Sophia Gardens, Cardiff; Umpires: Peter Hartley (Eng) and Russell Warren (Eng); Player of the match: Kane Richardson (Birmingham Phoenix)

15 August 2022	Trent Rockets; 145/6 (100 balls)	v	Birmingham Phoenix (H); 149/3 (86 balls)	Birmingham Phoenix won by 7 wickets
18:30; Scorecard	Trent Rockets; 145/6 (100 balls)	v	Birmingham Phoenix (H); 149/3 (86 balls)	Edgbaston, Birmingham; Umpires: Tom Lungley (Eng) and Martin Saggers (Eng); Player of the match: Moeen Ali (Birmingham Phoenix)
18:30; Scorecard	Daniel Sams 55* (25); Benny Howell 3/28 (20 balls)		Moeen Ali 52 (28); Luke Wood 3/17 (20 balls)	Edgbaston, Birmingham; Umpires: Tom Lungley (Eng) and Martin Saggers (Eng); Player of the match: Moeen Ali (Birmingham Phoenix)
Birmingham Phoenix won the toss and elected to field.; Points: Birmingham Phoenix 2, Trent Rockets 0.				Edgbaston, Birmingham; Umpires: Tom Lungley (Eng) and Martin Saggers (Eng); Player of the match: Moeen Ali (Birmingham Phoenix)

19 August 2022	Northern Superchargers; 169/6 (100 balls)	v	Birmingham Phoenix (H); 137/9 (100 balls)	Northern Superchargers won by 32 runs
19:00; Scorecard	Northern Superchargers; 169/6 (100 balls)	v	Birmingham Phoenix (H); 137/9 (100 balls)	Edgbaston, Birmingham; Umpires: James Middlebrook (Eng) and Steve O'Shaughnessy (Eng); Player of the match: David Wiese (Northern Superchargers)
19:00; Scorecard	Adam Lyth 56 (26); Moeen Ali 2/13 (15 balls)		Miles Hammond 31 (27); David Wiese 3/15 (20 balls)	Edgbaston, Birmingham; Umpires: James Middlebrook (Eng) and Steve O'Shaughnessy (Eng); Player of the match: David Wiese (Northern Superchargers)
Birmingham Phoenix won the toss and elected to field.; Points: Northern Superchargers 2, Birmingham Phoenix 0.				Edgbaston, Birmingham; Umpires: James Middlebrook (Eng) and Steve O'Shaughnessy (Eng); Player of the match: David Wiese (Northern Superchargers)

23 August 2022	Birmingham Phoenix; 166/6 (100 balls)	v	Oval Invincibles (H); 156/8 (100 balls)	Birmingham Phoenix won by 10 runs
18:30; Scorecard	Birmingham Phoenix; 166/6 (100 balls)	v	Oval Invincibles (H); 156/8 (100 balls)	The Oval, London; Umpires: James Middlebrook (Eng) and Martin Saggers (Eng); Player of the match: Kane Richardson (Birmingham Phoenix)
18:30; Scorecard	Liam Livingstone 45 (32); Matt Milnes 3/32 (20 balls)		Jordan Cox 32 (29); Tom Helm 3/11 (20 balls)	The Oval, London; Umpires: James Middlebrook (Eng) and Martin Saggers (Eng); Player of the match: Kane Richardson (Birmingham Phoenix)
Oval Invincibles won the toss and elected to field.; Points: Birmingham Phoenix 2, Oval Invincibles 0.				The Oval, London; Umpires: James Middlebrook (Eng) and Martin Saggers (Eng); Player of the match: Kane Richardson (Birmingham Phoenix)

28 August 2022	Manchester Originals; 154/6 (100 balls)	v	Birmingham Phoenix (H); 75 (74 balls)	Manchester Originals won by 79 runs
19:00; Scorecard	Manchester Originals; 154/6 (100 balls)	v	Birmingham Phoenix (H); 75 (74 balls)	Edgbaston, Birmingham; Umpires: Paul Pollard (Eng) and Alex Wharf (Eng); Player of the match: Tom Hartley (Manchester Originals)
19:00; Scorecard	Phil Salt 56 (38); Benny Howell 3/18 (20 balls)		Will Smeed 31 (17); Tom Hartley 4/22 (20 balls)	Edgbaston, Birmingham; Umpires: Paul Pollard (Eng) and Alex Wharf (Eng); Player of the match: Tom Hartley (Manchester Originals)
Manchester Originals won the toss and elected to bat.; Points: Manchester Originals 2, Birmingham Phoenix 0.				Edgbaston, Birmingham; Umpires: Paul Pollard (Eng) and Alex Wharf (Eng); Player of the match: Tom Hartley (Manchester Originals)

30 August 2022	(H) London Spirit; 139/6 (100 balls)	v	Birmingham Phoenix; 140/9 (100 balls)	Birmingham Phoenix won by 1 wicket
18:30; Scorecard	(H) London Spirit; 139/6 (100 balls)	v	Birmingham Phoenix; 140/9 (100 balls)	Lord's, London; Umpires: Mike Burns (Eng) and Martin Saggers (Eng); Player of the match: Matthew Wade (Birmingham Phoenix)
18:30; Scorecard	Ravi Bopara 45 (20); Tom Helm 4/17 (20 balls)		Matthew Wade 81 (42); Mason Crane 4/24 (20 balls)	Lord's, London; Umpires: Mike Burns (Eng) and Martin Saggers (Eng); Player of the match: Matthew Wade (Birmingham Phoenix)
Birmingham Phoenix won the toss and elected to field.; Points: Birmingham Phoenix 2, London Spirit 0.				Lord's, London; Umpires: Mike Burns (Eng) and Martin Saggers (Eng); Player of the match: Matthew Wade (Birmingham Phoenix)
