= 2024 Birmingham Phoenix season =

Birmingham Phoenix
2024 season
- Coach: Ben Sawyer (women); Daniel Vettori (men)
- Captain: Sophie Devine (women); Moeen Ali (men)
- Overseas player: Sophie Devine; Suzie Bates; Ellyse Perry; (women); Sean Abbott; Naseem Shah; Adam Milne; (men)
- Ground(s): Edgbaston

The 2024 season was Birmingham Phoenix's 4th season of the 100 ball franchise cricket, The Hundred.

== Players ==
=== Women's side ===
No.	Name	Nationality	Date of birth (age)	Batting style	Bowling style	Notes
Batters
2	Chloe Brewer	England	12 July 2002 (age 23)	Right-handed	Right-arm medium	
22	Sterre Kalis	Netherlands	30 August 1999 (age 26)	Right-handed	Right-arm medium	
28	Charis Pavely	England	25 October 2004 (age 21)	Left-handed	Slow left-arm orthodox	
—	Suzie Bates	New Zealand	16 September 1987 (age 38)	Right-handed	Right-arm medium	Overseas player; Replacement player
—	Ailsa Lister	Scotland	8 April 2004 (age 21)	Right-handed	—	Ruled out
—	Alice Macleod	England	14 May 1994 (age 31)	Right-handed	Right-arm off break	Wildcard player
—	Seren Smale	Wales	13 December 2004 (age 20)	Right-handed	—	
—	Fran Wilson	England	7 November 1991 (age 34)	Right-handed	Right-arm off break	Wildcard player
All-rounders
8	Ellyse Perry	Australia	3 November 1990 (age 35)	Right-handed	Right-arm fast-medium	Overseas player; Captain
77	Sophie Devine	New Zealand	1 September 1989 (age 36)	Right-handed	Right-arm medium	Overseas player
—	Emma Jones	England	8 August 2002 (age 23)	Right-handed	Right-arm medium	Replacement player
Wicket-keepers
40	Amy Jones	England	13 June 1993 (age 32)	Right-handed	—	
—	Richa Ghosh	India	28 September 2003 (age 22)	Right-handed	Right-arm medium	Overseas player
Pace bowlers
37	Emily Arlott	England	23 February 1998 (age 27)	Right-handed	Right-arm medium	
95	Issy Wong	England	15 May 2002 (age 23)	Right-handed	Right-arm fast	
Spin bowlers
3	Hannah Baker	England	3 February 2004 (age 21)	Right-handed	Right-arm leg break	
23	Katie Levick	England	17 July 1991 (age 34)	Right-handed	Right-arm leg break	

=== Men's side ===
No.	Name	Nationality	Date of birth (age)	Batting style	Bowling style	Notes
Batters
17	Ben Duckett	England	17 October 1994 (age 31)	Left-handed	—	
26	Will Smeed	England	26 October 2001 (age 24)	Right-handed	Right-arm off break	
80	Dan Mousley	England	8 July 2001 (age 24)	Left-handed	Right-arm off break	
—	Rishi Patel	England	26 July 1998 (age 27)	Right-handed	Right-arm leg break	Wildcard player
All-rounders
2	Jacob Bethell	England	23 October 2003 (age 22)	Left-handed	Slow left-arm orthodox	
13	Benny Howell	England	5 October 1988 (age 37)	Right-handed	Right-arm medium	
18	Moeen Ali	England	18 June 1987 (age 38)	Left-handed	Right-arm off break	Captain
23	Liam Livingstone	England	4 August 1993 (age 32)	Right-handed	Right-arm off break	
—	James Fuller	England	24 January 1990 (age 35)	Right-handed	Right-arm fast-medium	
Wicket-keepers
11	Jamie Smith	England	12 July 2000 (age 25)	Right-handed	—	
—	Aneurin Donald	Wales	20 December 1996 (age 28)	Right-handed	Right-arm off break	Wildcard player
Pace bowlers
7	Tom Helm	England	7 May 1994 (age 31)	Right-handed	Right-arm fast-medium	
19	Chris Woakes	England	2 March 1989 (age 36)	Right-handed	Right-arm fast-medium	Centrally Contracted player
20	Adam Milne	New Zealand	13 April 1992 (age 33)	Right-handed	Right-arm fast	Overseas player
—	Sean Abbott	Australia	29 February 1992 (age 33)	Right-handed	Right-arm fast-medium	
—	Naseem Shah	Pakistan	15 February 2003 (age 22)	Right-handed	Right-arm fast	Overseas player
Spin bowlers

== League stage ==
=== Women's fixtures ===
23 July 2024	Oval Invincibles	v	Birmingham Phoenix	The Oval, London
14:45; Scorecard	Oval Invincibles	v	Birmingham Phoenix

== Standings ==
Pos	Team	Pld	W	L	T	NR	Pts	NRR	Qualification
1	Welsh Fire	8	5	2	0	1	11	0.334	Advanced to the Final
2	Oval Invincibles	8	5	2	1	0	11	0.034	Advanced to the Eliminator
3	London Spirit	8	4	3	1	0	9	0.080	Advanced to the Eliminator
4	Northern Superchargers	8	3	3	1	1	8	0.942	
5	Trent Rockets	8	4	4	0	0	8	0.407	
6	Manchester Originals	8	3	4	0	1	7	−0.398	
7	Birmingham Phoenix	8	3	4	0	1	7	−0.742	
8	Southern Brave	8	1	6	1	0	3	−0.675	

Source: ESPNcricinfo

=== Men ===
Pos	Team	Pld	W	L	T	NR	Pts	NRR	Qualification
1	Oval Invincibles	8	6	2	0	0	12	0.893	Advanced to the Final
2	Birmingham Phoenix	8	6	2	0	0	12	0.402	Advanced to the Eliminator
3	Southern Brave	8	5	2	0	1	11	0.595	Advanced to the Eliminator
4	Northern Superchargers	8	5	2	0	1	11	−0.453	
5	Trent Rockets	8	4	4	0	0	8	0.348	
6	Welsh Fire	8	2	4	0	2	6	−0.215	
7	Manchester Originals	8	1	7	0	0	2	−0.886	
8	London Spirit	8	1	7	0	0	2	−0.975	

Source: ESPN Cricinfo
