= New Zealand cricket team in England in 2023 =

International cricket tour

New Zealand men's cricket team in England in 2023
	England	New Zealand
- Dates: 30 August – 15 September 2023
Captains	Jos Buttler	Tom Latham (ODIs); Tim Southee (T20Is)

One Day International series
- Results: England won the 4-match series 3–1
Most runs	Dawid Malan (277)	Daryl Mitchell (196)
Most wickets	Moeen Ali (7)	Trent Boult (8)
- Player of the series: Dawid Malan (Eng)

Twenty20 International series
- Results: 4-match series drawn 2–2
Most runs	Jonny Bairstow (175)	Glenn Phillips (174)
Most wickets	Gus Atkinson (6)	Ish Sodhi (8)
- Player of the series: Jonny Bairstow (Eng)

The New Zealand national cricket team toured England and Wales in August and September 2023 to play four One Day International (ODI) and four Twenty20 International (T20I) matches against England. The ODI matches formed part of both teams' preparations for the 2023 Cricket World Cup.

== Squads ==
England		New Zealand	
ODIs	T20Is	ODIs	T20Is
Jos Buttler (c, wk); Moeen Ali; Gus Atkinson; Jonny Bairstow (wk); Harry Brook; Sam Curran; Liam Livingstone; Dawid Malan; Adil Rashid; Joe Root; Jason Roy; Ben Stokes; Reece Topley; David Willey; Mark Wood; Chris Woakes	Jos Buttler (c, wk); Rehan Ahmed; Moeen Ali; Gus Atkinson; Jonny Bairstow (wk); Harry Brook; Brydon Carse; Sam Curran; Ben Duckett (wk); Will Jacks; Chris Jordan; Liam Livingstone; Dawid Malan; Adil Rashid; ~~Josh Tongue~~; ~~John Turner~~; Luke Wood	Tom Latham (c, wk); Finn Allen (wk); Trent Boult; Devon Conway (wk); Lockie Ferguson; Matt Henry; Kyle Jamieson; Ben Lister; Adam Milne; Daryl Mitchell; Henry Nicholls; Glenn Phillips (wk); Rachin Ravindra; Mitchell Santner; Tim Southee; Will Young	Tim Southee (c); Finn Allen (wk); Mark Chapman; Devon Conway (wk); Lockie Ferguson; Matt Henry; Kyle Jamieson; Cole McConchie; Adam Milne; Daryl Mitchell; ~~Jimmy Neesham~~; Glenn Phillips (wk); Rachin Ravindra; Mitchell Santner; Tim Seifert (wk); Ish Sodhi

Ahead of the T20I series, John Turner and Josh Tongue were ruled out of England's T20I squad due to injuries and were replaced by Brydon Carse and Chris Jordan respectively. Jimmy Neesham was ruled out from the New Zealand's T20I squad to return home for the birth of his first child, with Cole McConchie was named as his replacement. On 6 September Harry Brook was added into squad for ODI matches. On 9 September, Adam Milne was ruled out of the ODI series, and replaced by Ben Lister.

== Tour matches ==
25 August 2023
14:30
Scorecard

Worcestershire; 124 (19 overs)	v	New Zealand; 126/3 (12 overs)
Olly Cox 63 (36); Lockie Ferguson 3/11 (3 overs)		Chad Bowes 35 (17); Harry Darley 2/20 (3 overs)

New Zealand won by 7 wickets
New Road, Worcester
Umpires: Tom Lungley (Eng) and Paul Pollard (Eng)

- New Zealand won the toss and elected to field.

27 August 2023
18:00 (N)
Scorecard

New Zealand; 168/6 (20 overs)	v	Gloucestershire; 146/6 (20 overs)
Glenn Phillips 65* (37); Ed Middleton 2/10 (2 overs)		Joe Phillips 71* (61); Ish Sodhi 3/23 (4 overs)

New Zealand won by 22 runs
Bristol County Ground, Bristol
Umpires: Mark Newell (Eng) and Surendiran Shanmugam (Eng)

- Gloucestershire won the toss and elected to field.

== T20I series ==
=== 1st T20I ===
30 August 2023
18:00 (N)
Scorecard

New Zealand; 139/9 (20 overs)	v	England; 143/3 (14 overs)
Glenn Phillips 41 (38); Brydon Carse 3/23 (4 overs)		Dawid Malan 54 (42); Ish Sodhi 1/23 (2 overs)

England won by 7 wickets
Riverside Ground, Chester-le-Street
Umpires: Mike Burns (Eng) and Martin Saggers (Eng)
Player of the match: Brydon Carse (Eng)

- England won the toss and elected to field.
- Brydon Carse (Eng) made his T20I debut.

=== 2nd T20I ===
1 September 2023
18:00 (N)
Scorecard

England; 198/4 (20 overs)	v	New Zealand; 103 (13.5 overs)
Jonny Bairstow 86* (60); Ish Sodhi 2/44 (4 overs)		Tim Seifert 39 (31); Gus Atkinson 4/20 (2.5 overs)

England won by 95 runs
Old Trafford, Manchester
Umpires: Martin Saggers (Eng) and Alex Wharf (Eng)
Player of the match: Jonny Bairstow (Eng)

- England won the toss and elected to bat.
- Gus Atkinson (Eng) made his T20I debut.

=== 3rd T20I ===
3 September 2023
14:30
Scorecard

New Zealand; 202/5 (20 overs)	v	England; 128 (18.3 overs)
Finn Allen 83 (53); Gus Atkinson 2/31 (4 overs)		Jos Buttler 40 (21); Kyle Jamieson 3/23 (4 overs)

New Zealand won by 74 runs
Edgbaston, Birmingham
Umpires: David Millns (Eng) and Alex Wharf (Eng)
Player of the match: Finn Allen (NZ)

- New Zealand won the toss and elected to bat.

=== 4th T20I ===
5 September 2023
18:00 (N)
Scorecard

England; 175/8 (20 overs)	v	New Zealand; 179/4 (17.2 overs)
Jonny Bairstow 73 (41); Mitchell Santner 3/30 (4 overs)		Tim Seifert 48 (32); Rehan Ahmed 2/27 (4 overs)

New Zealand won by 6 wickets
Trent Bridge, Nottingham
Umpires: Mike Burns (Eng) and David Millns (Eng)
Player of the match: Mitchell Santner (NZ)

- England won the toss and elected to bat.

== ODI series ==
=== 1st ODI ===
8 September 2023
12:30 (D/N)
Scorecard

England; 291/6 (50 overs)	v	New Zealand; 297/2 (45.4 overs)
Jos Buttler 72 (68); Rachin Ravindra 3/48 (10 overs)		Daryl Mitchell 118* (91); David Willey 1/32 (6 overs)

New Zealand won by 8 wickets
Sophia Gardens, Cardiff
Umpires: Paul Reiffel (Aus) and Alex Wharf (Eng)
Player of the match: Devon Conway (NZ)

- New Zealand won the toss and elected to field.

=== 2nd ODI ===
10 September 2023
11:00
Scorecard

England; 226/7 (34 overs)	v	New Zealand; 147 (26.5 overs)
Liam Livingstone 95* (78); Trent Boult 3/37 (7 overs)		Daryl Mitchell 57 (52); Reece Topley 3/27 (7 overs)

England won by 79 runs (DLS method)
Rose Bowl, Southampton
Umpires: Adrian Holdstock (SA) and Martin Saggers (Eng)
Player of the match: Liam Livingstone (Eng)

- New Zealand won the toss and elected to field.
- The match was reduced to 34 overs per side due to rain.

=== 3rd ODI ===
13 September 2023
12:30 (D/N)
Scorecard

England; 368 (48.1 overs)	v	New Zealand; 187 (39 overs)
Ben Stokes 182 (124); Trent Boult 5/51 (10 overs)		Glenn Phillips 72 (76); Liam Livingstone 3/16 (5 overs)

England won by 181 runs
The Oval, London
Umpires: Paul Reiffel (Aus) and Alex Wharf (Eng)
Player of the match: Ben Stokes (Eng)

- New Zealand won the toss and elected to field.
- Ben Stokes scored highest individual score for England in ODIs.

=== 4th ODI ===
15 September 2023
12:30 (D/N)
Scorecard

England; 311/9 (50 overs)	v	New Zealand; 211 (38.2 overs)
Dawid Malan 127 (114); Rachin Ravindra 4/60 (10 overs)		Rachin Ravindra 61 (48); Moeen Ali 4/50 (10 overs)

England won by 100 runs
Lord's, London
Umpires: Adrian Holdstock (SA) and Martin Saggers (Eng)
Player of the match: Dawid Malan (Eng)

- England won the toss and elected to bat.
