= James Alexander Carse =

Zimbabwean cricketer (born 1958)

James Carse
Personal information
- Born: 13 December 1958 (age 67); Salisbury, Southern Rhodesia
- Batting: Right-handed
- Bowling: Right-arm fast-medium
- Relatives: Brydon Carse (son)

Career statistics
Competition	First-class	List A
Matches	60	25
Runs scored	485	54
Batting average	11.02	18.00
100s/50s	0/0	0/0
Top score	44	16*
Balls bowled	8,243	1,300
Wickets	137	39
Bowling average	32.54	22.94
5 wickets in innings	3	0
10 wickets in match	0	0
Best bowling	6/50	4/18
Catches/stumpings	19/–	2/–
- Source: Cricinfo, 16 April 2023

James Alexander Carse (born 13 December 1958) is a Zimbabwean former first class cricketer. He played Currie Cup cricket for Border, Western and Eastern Provinces in South Africa during the 1980s. He also played county cricket in England for Northamptonshire in 1983.

He was an attacking right arm fast-medium bowler and lower order right-hand batsman.

While playing for Northamptonshire, he took 5/43 in an innings against Glamorgan at Cardiff in August 1983.

His son, Brydon Carse, currently plays for England in international cricket after making his debut in July 2021.
