= Joe Phillips (English cricketer, born 2003) =

English cricketer (born 2003)

Personal information
- Full name: Joseph Peter Phillips
- Born: 9 November 2003 (age 23); Truro, Cornwall, England
- Batting: Right-handed
- Bowling: Right-arm off break
- Role: Batter

Domestic team information
- Years: Team
- 2023–present: Gloucestershire (squad no. 24)
- FC debut: 20 July 2023 Gloucestershire v Glamorgan
- LA debut: 4 August 2023 Gloucestershire v Northamptonshire

Career statistics
Competition	FC	LA	T20
Matches	21	6	4
Runs scored	1,038	131	60
Batting average	27.31	32.75	15.00
100s/50s	1/6	0/1	0/0
Top score	136	61*	42
Catches/stumpings	7/–	4/–	3/–
- Source: Cricinfo, 27 September 2026

Joseph Peter Phillips (born 9 November 2003) is an English cricketer who plays for Gloucestershire County Cricket Club. He is a right-handed opening batsman and right arm offbreak bowler.

== Early life ==
From Cornwall, he attended Penair School in Truro and Clifton College. He played for Cornwall County Cricket Club as a youngster.

== Career ==
He was part of the Gloucestershire County Cricket Club Academy for three years prior to signing a short term pro-contract in May 2023. He made his first-class debut for Gloucestershire in the 2023 County Championship against Glamorgan on 20 July 2023. In that month, he hit a half-century (80) in his second game against Worcestershire. He made his List A debut for Gloucestershire against Northamptonshire in the 2023 One-Day Cup on 4 August 2023.

He also impressed in T20 Cricket for the county in scoring an unbeaten 71 against the touring New Zealand on 27 August 2023. In October 2023, he extended his contract with Gloucestershire. He made his first County Championship half century on the 28 September 2024, scoring 64 against Glamorgan in Cardiff. He scored his maiden first-class century against Middlesex in 2025.

Phillips signed a new three-year contract with Gloucestershire in November 2025, tying him into the club until at least the end of the 2028 season.
