= Pakistani cricket team in England in 2021 =

International cricket tour

	England	Pakistan
- Dates: 8 – 20 July 2021
Captains	Ben Stokes (ODIs); Eoin Morgan (T20Is) (Note: Jos Buttler captained England for the second T20I.)	Babar Azam

One Day International series
- Results: England won the 3-match series 3–0
Most runs	James Vince (158)	Babar Azam (177)
Most wickets	Saqib Mahmood (9)	Hasan Ali (6); Haris Rauf (6)
- Player of the series: Saqib Mahmood (Eng)

Twenty20 International series
- Results: England won the 3-match series 2–1
Most runs	Liam Livingstone (147)	Mohammad Rizwan (176)
Most wickets	Adil Rashid (6)	Shadab Khan (5)
- Player of the series: Liam Livingstone (Eng)

The Pakistan cricket team toured England in July 2021 to play three One Day International (ODI) and three Twenty20 International (T20I) matches. The ODI series formed part of the inaugural 2020–2023 ICC Cricket World Cup Super League.

Ahead of the ODI series, the England squad were forced to self-isolate following positive tests for COVID-19, with Ben Stokes named as their ODI captain. In response, the Pakistan Cricket Board (PCB) were satisfied by the response from the England and Wales Cricket Board (ECB) with regard to following COVID-19 protocols. England won the first two ODI matches to win the series with a game to spare. England then won the third ODI by three wickets to win the series 3–0. Pakistan won the first T20I match by 31 runs. England went on to win the next two matches to win the series 2–1.

== Squads ==
ODIs		T20Is	
England	Pakistan	England	Pakistan
Ben Stokes (c); Jake Ball; Danny Briggs; Brydon Carse; Zak Crawley; Ben Duckett (wk); Lewis Gregory; Tom Helm; Will Jacks; Dan Lawrence; Saqib Mahmood; Dawid Malan; Craig Overton; Matt Parkinson; David Payne; Phil Salt; John Simpson (wk); James Vince	Babar Azam (c); Shadab Khan (vc); Shaheen Afridi; Sarfaraz Ahmed (wk); ~~Haider Ali~~; Hasan Ali; Faheem Ashraf; Mohammad Hasnain; Sohaib Maqsood; Mohammad Nawaz; Usman Qadir; Haris Rauf; Mohammad Rizwan (wk); Agha Salman; Abdullah Shafique; Saud Shakeel; ~~Haris Sohail~~; Imam-ul-Haq; Fakhar Zaman	Eoin Morgan (c); Moeen Ali; Jonny Bairstow (wk); Jake Ball; Tom Banton; Jos Buttler (wk); Tom Curran; Lewis Gregory; Chris Jordan; Liam Livingstone; Saqib Mahmood; Dawid Malan; Matt Parkinson; Adil Rashid; Jason Roy; David Willey	Babar Azam (c); Shadab Khan (vc); Shaheen Afridi; Sarfaraz Ahmed (wk); ~~Haider Ali~~; Hasan Ali; Faheem Ashraf; Mohammad Hafeez; Mohammad Hasnain; Arshad Iqbal; Azam Khan; Sharjeel Khan; Sohaib Maqsood; Mohammad Nawaz; Usman Qadir; Haris Rauf; Mohammad Rizwan (wk); Imad Wasim; Mohammad Wasim; Fakhar Zaman

On 24 June 2021, Haider Ali was withdrawn from Pakistan's squad, after breaching the bio-secure bubble at the 2021 Pakistan Super League tournament. Sohaib Maqsood was named as his replacement. On 8 July 2021, Pakistan's Haris Sohail was ruled of the ODI matches due to hamstring injury.

On 3 July 2021, England's squad was named for the ODI series. However, on 6 July 2021, it was announced that seven individuals, three squad members and four support staff, had tested positive for COVID-19. Therefore, the whole team was forced to isolate. Ben Stokes was named as the captain, with a new squad announced later the same day.

== Practice match ==
Prior to the ODI series, the Pakistan team were scheduled to play two 50-over intra-squad practice matches. However, the second match was cancelled due to rain.

1 July 2021
11:00

Babar Azam XI; 364/5 (50 overs)	v	Shadab Khan XI; 200 (32.4 overs)
Babar Azam 100		Abdullah Shafique 106

Babar Azam XI won by 164 runs
County Cricket Ground, Derby

- Shadab Khan XI won the toss and elected to field.

== ODI series ==
=== 1st ODI ===
8 July 2021
13:00 (D/N)
Scorecard

Pakistan; 141 (35.2 overs)	v	England; 142/1 (21.5 overs)
Fakhar Zaman 47 (67); Saqib Mahmood 4/42 (10 overs)		Dawid Malan 68* (69); Shaheen Afridi 1/22 (5 overs)

England won by 9 wickets
Sophia Gardens, Cardiff
Umpires: Richard Kettleborough (Eng) and Alex Wharf (Eng)
Player of the match: Saqib Mahmood (Eng)

- England won the toss and elected to field.
- Brydon Carse, Zak Crawley, Lewis Gregory, Phil Salt, John Simpson (Eng), and Saud Shakeel (Pak) all made their ODI debuts.
- Ben Stokes captained England for the first time in ODIs.
- World Cup Super League points: England 10, Pakistan 0.

=== 2nd ODI ===
10 July 2021
11:00
Scorecard

England; 247 (45.2 overs)	v	Pakistan; 195 (41 overs)
Phil Salt 60 (54); Hasan Ali 5/51 (9.2 overs)		Saud Shakeel 56 (77); Lewis Gregory 3/44 (8 overs)

England won by 52 runs
Lord's, London
Umpires: Richard Illingworth (Eng) and Alex Wharf (Eng)
Player of the match: Lewis Gregory (Eng)

- Pakistan won the toss and elected to field.
- The match was reduced to 47 overs per side due to rain.
- Ben Stokes (Eng) played in his 100th ODI.
- World Cup Super League points: England 10, Pakistan 0.

=== 3rd ODI ===
13 July 2021
13:00 (D/N)
Scorecard

Pakistan; 331/9 (50 overs)	v	England; 332/7 (48 overs)
Babar Azam 158 (139); Brydon Carse 5/61 (10 overs)		James Vince 102 (95); Haris Rauf 4/65 (9 overs)

England won by 3 wickets
Edgbaston Cricket Ground, Birmingham
Umpires: Richard Illingworth (Eng) and David Millns (Eng)
Player of the match: James Vince (Eng)

- England won the toss and elected to field.
- Imam-ul-Haq (Pak) scored his 2,000th run in ODIs.
- Brydon Carse (Eng) took his first five-wicket haul in ODIs.
- James Vince (Eng) scored his first century in ODIs.
- World Cup Super League points: England 10, Pakistan 0.

== T20I series ==
=== 1st T20I ===
16 July 2021
18:30 (N)
Scorecard

Pakistan; 232/6 (20 overs)	v	England; 201 (19.2 overs)
Babar Azam 85 (49); Tom Curran 2/47 (4 overs)		Liam Livingstone 103 (43); Shaheen Afridi 3/30 (3.2 overs)

Pakistan won by 31 runs
Trent Bridge, Nottingham
Umpires: David Millns (Eng) and Martin Saggers (Eng)
Player of the match: Shaheen Afridi (Pak)

- England won the toss and elected to field.
- Azam Khan (Pak) made his T20I debut.
- Pakistan made their highest total in T20Is.
- Liam Livingstone (Eng) scored his first century in T20Is.
- Liam Livingstone also scored the fastest fifty and the fastest century by a batsman for England in T20Is, from 17 balls and 42 balls respectively.

=== 2nd T20I ===
18 July 2021
14:30
Scorecard

England; 200 (19.5 overs)	v	Pakistan; 155/9 (20 overs)
Jos Buttler 59 (39); Mohammad Hasnain 3/51 (4 overs)		Mohammad Rizwan 37 (29); Saqib Mahmood 3/33 (4 overs)

England won by 45 runs
Headingley Cricket Ground, Leeds
Umpires: Martin Saggers (Eng) and Alex Wharf (Eng)
Player of the match: Moeen Ali (Eng)

- Pakistan won the toss and elected to field.
- This was the first T20I match to be played at this ground.

=== 3rd T20I ===
20 July 2021
18:30 (N)
Scorecard

Pakistan; 154/6 (20 overs)	v	England; 155/7 (19.4 overs)
Mohammad Rizwan 76* (57); Adil Rashid 4/35 (4 overs)		Jason Roy 64 (36); Mohammad Hafeez 3/28 (4 overs)

England won by 3 wickets
Old Trafford Cricket Ground, Manchester
Umpires: David Millns (Eng) and Alex Wharf (Eng)
Player of the match: Jason Roy (Eng)

- Pakistan won the toss and elected to bat.
