= Brydon Carse =

English cricketer (born 1995)

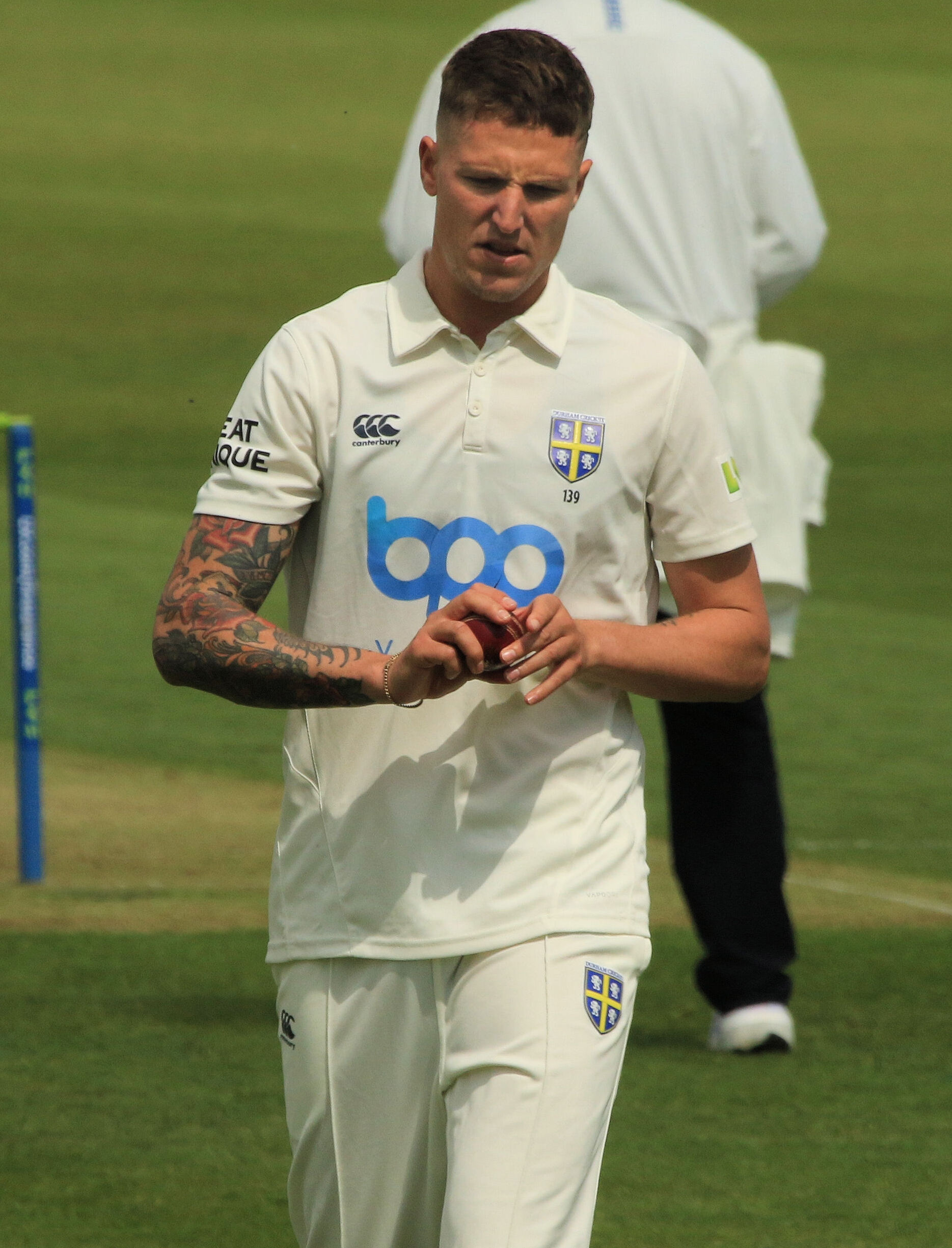
- Carse in 2023

Personal information
- Full name: Brydon Alexander Carse
- Born: 31 July 1995 (age 31); Port Elizabeth , Eastern Cape Province, South Africa
- Height: 6 ft 3 in (1.91 m)
- Batting: Right-handed
- Bowling: Right-arm fast (Note: Although the Cricinfo player page for Carse lists him as a fast-medium bowling all-rounder, most other sources (including other reports on Cricinfo) call him a fast bowler. The same player page also describes him as "a strapping fast bowler with a quick arm action" in its prose profile.)
- Role: Bowler
- Relatives: James Carse (father)

International information
- National side: England (2021–present)
- Test debut (cap 717): 7 October 2024 v Pakistan
- Last Test: 4 January 2026 v Australia
- ODI debut (cap 259): 8 July 2021 v Pakistan
- Last ODI: 1 November 2025 v New Zealand
- T20I debut (cap 100): 30 August 2023 v New Zealand
- Last T20I: 23 October 2025 v New Zealand

Domestic team information
- Years: Team
- 2014/15: Eastern Province
- 2016–present: Durham (squad no. 99)
- 2021–present: Sunrisers Leeds (squad no. 99)

Career statistics
| Competition | Test | ODI | T20I | FC |
|---|---|---|---|---|
| Matches | 14 | 30 | 14 | 67 |
| Runs scored | 357 | 264 | 46 | 2,057 |
| Batting average | 17.85 | 17.60 | 9.20 | 27.42 |
| 100s/50s | 0/1 | 0/0 | 0/0 | 2/7 |
| Top score | 56 | 36 | 31 | 108* |
| Balls bowled | 2,699 | 1,301 | 268 | 10,150 |
| Wickets | 58 | 34 | 20 | 206 |
| Bowling average | 30.18 | 40.44 | 20.60 | 32.10 |
| 5 wickets in innings | 1 | 1 | 0 | 7 |
| 10 wickets in match | 1 | 0 | 0 | 1 |
| Best bowling | 6/42 | 5/61 | 3/23 | 6/26 |
| Catches/stumpings | 14/– | 10/– | 7/– | 28/– |
- Source: Cricinfo, 27 September 2026

Brydon Alexander Carse (born 31 July 1995) is an English cricketer who plays for Durham and England. Primarily a right-arm fast bowler, he also bats right handed. Born in South Africa, he is the son of Zimbabwean cricketer James Alexander Carse, who played in England for Northamptonshire. Carse regularly clocks speeds around 91 mph (146 km/h). He made his international debut for the England cricket team in July 2021.

== Domestic career ==
Carse signed a development contract with Durham in 2016, and made his first-class debut in that year's County Championship. He picked up 17 wickets on his debut season for Durham and he was rewarded with a two-year deal by the club. He was ruled out of the 2018 County Championship due to a knee injury. In September 2018, he was offered a three-year contract by Durham.

Carse made his List A debut on 17 April 2019, for Durham in the 2019 Royal London One-Day Cup. In April 2022, he was bought by the Northern Superchargers for the 2022 season of The Hundred.

On 31 May 2024, Carse was given a 16-month ban (of which 13 months were suspended) for breaches of ECB betting regulations, having been found to have placed 303 bets on cricket matches between 2017 and 2019. Most of the offences took place when he was watching games on television at home whilst suffering from two long-term injuries, and involved small amounts of money.

On the night of 22 August, 2026, Carse was handcuffed by police and led away from a nightclub. The ECB has launched an investigation into the matter, with further updates still to come.

== International career ==
Carse is qualified to play in English county cricket due to his British ancestry, and completed his England residency qualification in 2019. He was named in England's ODI squad for their series against Pakistan in July 2021, after the original squad for the tour was forced to withdraw following positive tests for COVID-19. Carse made his ODI debut on 8 July 2021, for England against Pakistan. On 13 July 2021, in the third ODI against Pakistan, Carse took his maiden five-wicket haul in ODIs. In May 2022, Carse was named in England's 14 man ODI squad against the Netherlands. In the second ODI Carse impressed with his pace, clocking speeds up to 91 mph (146 km/h).

He made his T20 debut against New Zealand on the 30 August 2023, having been called up as a replacement for the injured Josh Tongue, and won man of the match by taking 3–23.

He was also called up on 23 October 2023 as a replacement for the injured Reece Topley during the 2023 ODI World Cup.

On 7 October 2024, Carse made his Test debut in the first Test against Pakistan at Multan. The following day, he dismissed Naseem Shah to take his maiden Test wicket, and finished the match with figures of 4/140 (from 38 overs).

In August 2026, Carse became the subject of an investigation by the England and Wales Cricket Board following an incident in Derby. On the night of 22 August, he was filmed being detained by police outside a nightclub after an altercation. He was subsequently dropped from the England squad for the second and third Tests against Pakistan whilst the police investigations continued.
