= Gwenan Davies =

Welsh cricketer

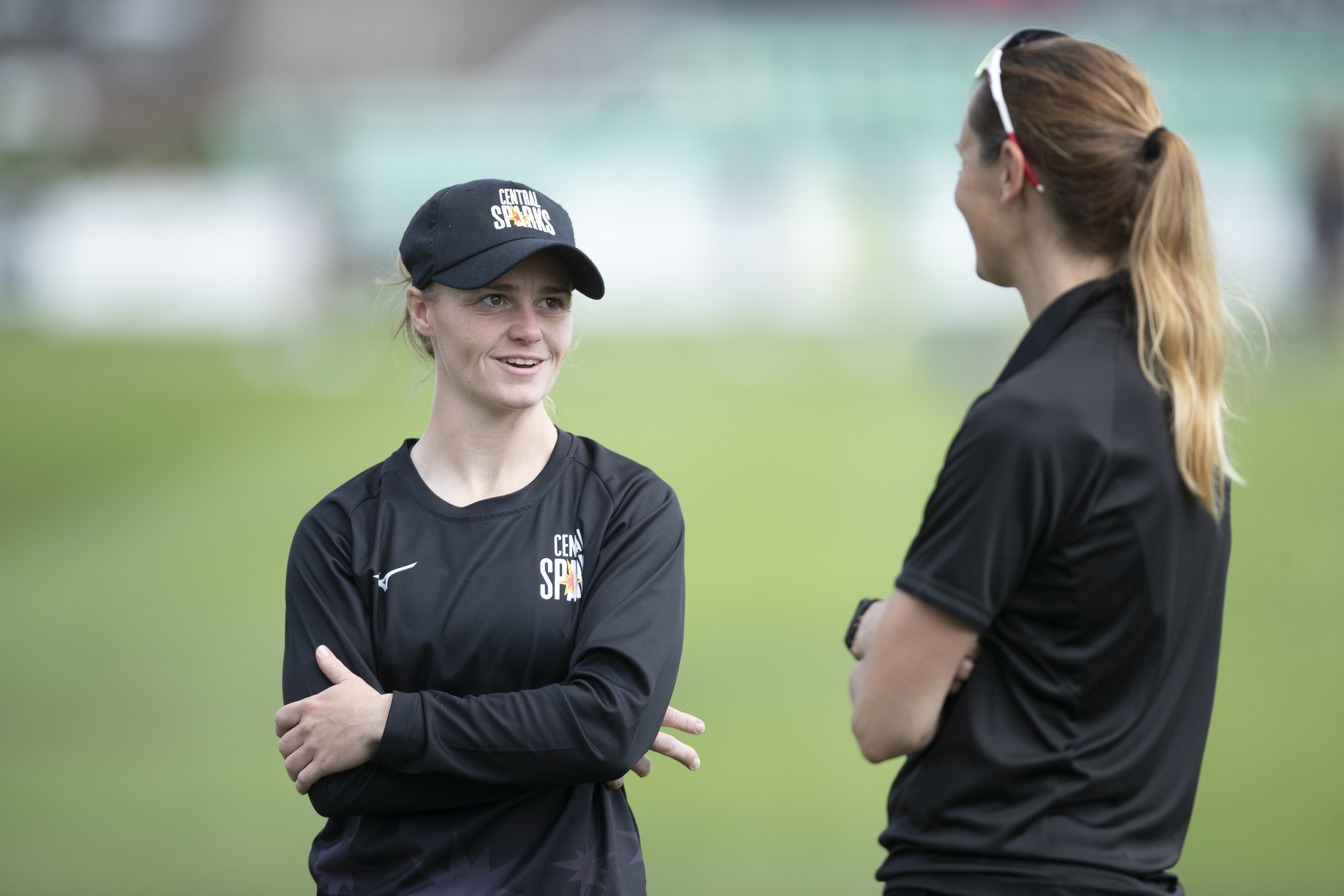
- Gwenan Davies in 2021

Personal information
- Full name: Gwenan Mai Davies
- Born: 12 May 1994 (age 32); Neath, Wales
- Batting: Left-handed
- Bowling: Right-arm medium-fast
- Role: Wicket-keeper

Domestic team information
- Years: Team
- 2008–2014: Wales
- 2015–2017: Somerset
- 2018–present: Warwickshire
- 2019: → Worcestershire (on loan)
- 2018: Yorkshire Diamonds
- 2019: Surrey Stars
- 2020–2022: Central Sparks
- 2022: → Lightning (on loan)
- 2021–2022: Birmingham Phoenix

Career statistics
Competition	WLA	WT20
Matches	92	103
Runs scored	1,507	1,389
Batting average	17.32	18.27
100s/50s	0/8	0/3
Top score	96	66*
Balls bowled	945	245
Wickets	23	10
Bowling average	31.95	32.80
5 wickets in innings	0	0
10 wickets in match	0	0
Best bowling	2/7	2/18
Catches/stumpings	37/8	35/31
- Source: CricketArchive, 23 October 2023

Gwenan Mai Davies (born 12 May 1994) is a Welsh cricketer who currently plays for Warwickshire. She plays as a wicket-keeper and left-handed batter, as well as occasionally bowling right-arm medium-fast. She has previously played for Wales, Somerset and Central Sparks, as well as Yorkshire Diamonds and Surrey Stars in the Women's Cricket Super League and Birmingham Phoenix in The Hundred.

== Early life ==
Davies was born on 12 May 1994 in Neath, Wales. She works as Head of Girls' Cricket at Shrewsbury School.

== Domestic career ==
Davies made her debut for Wales in a 2007 County Challenge Cup against Oxfordshire. She scored 22* in a 174 run victory. Davies played for Wales until 2014, after which she joined Somerset. In her first season with Somerset, she was the side's second-leading run-scorer in the 2015 Women's County Championship, and achieved her List A high score of 96 in a match against Durham.

In 2018, Davies joined Warwickshire. She was part of the side that won the 2019 Women's Twenty20 Cup, and Davies was the second-highest run-scorer for the team, with 200 runs at an average of 33.33. She hit consecutive half-centuries in games against Middlesex and Kent on 23 June. She also played one match for Worcestershire in the 2019 Women's County Championship.

Davies also played in the Women's Cricket Super League, for Yorkshire Diamonds in 2018 and for Surrey Stars in 2019, but made little impact with the bat for either side. In 2020, Davies played for Central Sparks in the Rachael Heyhoe Flint Trophy. She scored 169 runs across the six matches, at an average of 28.16. In December 2020, it was announced that Davies was one of the 41 female cricketers that had signed a full-time domestic contract.

In 2021, Davies was ever-present for Central Sparks across the Rachael Heyhoe Flint Trophy and the Charlotte Edwards Cup. She made one half-century for the side that season, scoring 50 from 59 deliveries against Sunrisers. She also played for Birmingham Phoenix in The Hundred, scoring 48 runs across the nine matches she appeared in. She played every match for Central Sparks in the 2022 Charlotte Edwards Cup, scoring 42 runs. She did not play for Sparks in the 2022 Rachael Heyhoe Flint Trophy, but did join Lightning on loan, playing two matches. She also played four matches for Birmingham Phoenix in The Hundred. Ahead of the 2023 season, it was confirmed that Davies had left Central Sparks.

Davies has also been part of the England Development Programme, and played for Rubies in the 2013 Super Fours.
