= Miles Hammond =

English cricketer

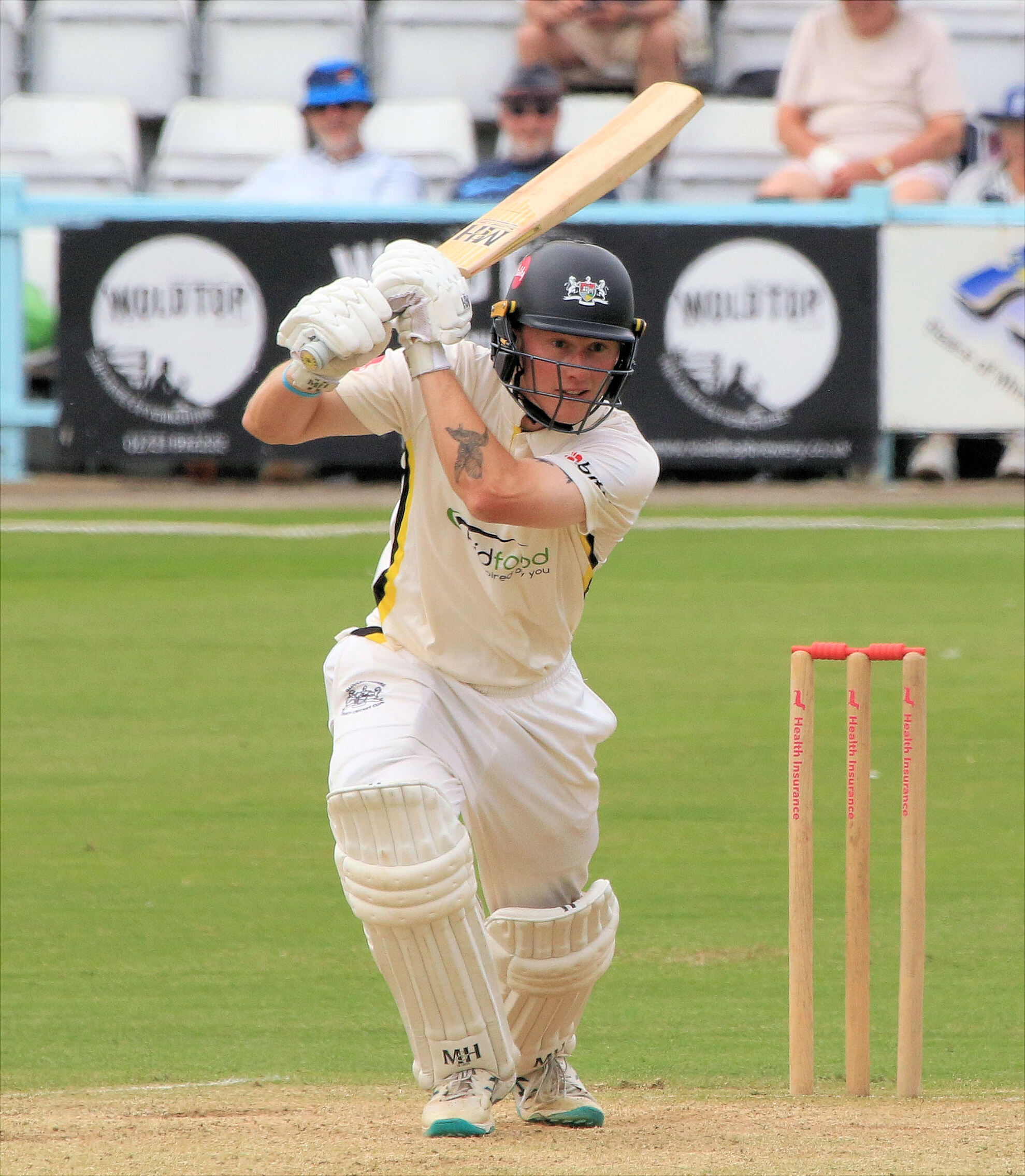
- Hammond in 2024

Personal information
- Full name: Miles Arthur Halhead Hammond
- Born: 11 January 1996 (age 30); Cheltenham, Gloucestershire, England
- Batting: Left-handed
- Bowling: Right-arm off break

Domestic team information
- Years: Team
- 2013–present: Gloucestershire (squad no. 88)
- 2021–2022: Birmingham Phoenix (squad no. 8)
- 2025: Oval Invincibles
- FC debut: 5 June 2013 Gloucestershire v Glamorgan
- LA debut: 2 June 2013 Gloucestershire v Yorkshire

Career statistics
Competition	FC	LA	T20
Matches	104	26	139
Runs scored	5,890	788	2,716
Batting average	33.46	34.26	21.90
100s/50s	8/39	2/4	0/9
Top score	169	157	80
Balls bowled	1,281	126	12
Wickets	9	5	0
Bowling average	107.55	24.00	–
5 wickets in innings	0	0	–
10 wickets in match	0	0	–
Best bowling	2/2	2/18	–
Catches/stumpings	78/–	11/–	81/–
- Source: CricInfo, 27 September 2026

Miles Arthur Halhead Hammond (born 11 January 1996) is an English cricketer who plays for Gloucestershire County Cricket Club.

Born in Cheltenham and educated at St Edward's School, Oxford, and before that Christ Church Cathedral School in Oxford. Hammond played a number of matches for the England Under-19 cricket team. He spent the 2014 season playing for Home Counties League team Aston Rowant, near his home in Oxfordshire.

He scored 103, his first century, for Gloucestershire against Sussex, in July 2018. In April 2022, he was bought by the Birmingham Phoenix for the 2022 season of The Hundred.
