= Adam Milne =

New Zealand cricketer (born 1992)

Personal information
- Full name: Adam Fraser Milne
- Born: 13 April 1992 (age 34); Palmerston North, New Zealand
- Height: 1.89 m (6 ft 2 in)
- Batting: Right-handed
- Bowling: Right-arm fast
- Role: Bowler

International information
- National side: New Zealand (2010–present)
- ODI debut (cap 175): 10 November 2012 v Sri Lanka
- Last ODI: 19 November 2024 v Sri Lanka
- ODI shirt no.: 20
- T20I debut (cap 46): 26 December 2010 v Pakistan
- Last T20I: 1 November 2026 v India
- T20I shirt no.: 20

Domestic team information
- Years: Team
- 2009/10–present: Central Districts
- 2016–2017: Royal Challengers Bangalore
- 2017–2021: Kent
- 2020/21: Sydney Thunder
- 2021: Mumbai Indians
- 2021–2025: Birmingham Phoenix
- 2022: Chennai Super Kings
- 2023: Washington Freedom
- 2024: Melbourne Stars
- 2025-2026: Texas Super Kings
- 2026: Rajasthan Royals
- 2026: London Spirit

Career statistics
Competition	ODI	T20I	FC	LA
Matches	50	60	31	102
Runs scored	180	84	776	617
Batting average	12.85	8.40	23.51	16.23
100s/50s	0/0	0/0	0/4	0/1
Top score	36	16*	97	50
Balls bowled	2,242	1,235	5,529	4,698
Wickets	57	71	92	148
Bowling average	35.56	24.39	32.25	27.46
5 wickets in innings	0	1	2	2
10 wickets in match	0	0	0	0
Best bowling	4/34	5/26	5/47	5/24
Catches/stumpings	23/–	13/–	10/–	35/–
Medal record
Men's cricket
Representing New Zealand
ICC Cricket World Cup
Runner-up	2015 Australia & New Zealand
ICC T20 World Cup
Runner-up	2021 UAE & Oman
- Source: ESPNcricinfo, 1 November 2026

Adam Fraser Milne (born 13 April 1992) is a New Zealand professional cricketer who plays limited overs cricket for the New Zealand national cricket team. He is a right-arm fast bowler. He was also a part of the New Zealand squad to finish as runners-up at the 2015 Cricket World Cup, after they lost to Australia.

== Early life ==
Milne was born in Palmerston North, New Zealand and attended Palmerston North Intermediate Normal School, and then Palmerston North Boys' High School.

== Cricket career ==
Milne made his first-class cricket debut as an 18 year old for Central Districts in the 2009/10 season against Canterbury. He took a wicket with his second ball in senior cricket. He has played for the team throughout his professional career, although his appearances have been limited by injuries and by international duties.

He was recruited for the 2015 Indian Premier League by Royal Challengers Bangalore (RCB) but was unable to play due to injury; he did play for RCB in both the 2016 and 2017 editions of the tournament. In May 2017, Milne signed for Kent County Cricket Club to play the second half of the 2017 English cricket season. Milne had been due to play for Essex in the 2016 season but was forced to withdraw due to injury. He made his debut for Kent in the 2017 County Championship against Nottinghamshire in June 2017. He played in five Championship matches and seven matches in the 2017 NatWest t20 Blast for Kent, taking 28 wickets. He set a new record for Kent's best bowling in T20 matches with 5/11 taken against Somerset at Taunton in August, his best T20 bowling figures. He returned to play for Kent in both the 2018 and 2019 t20 Blast.

Milne debuted for the New Zealand Cricket Team in 2010 and, although expensive, his pace impressed critics who marked him as a long-term prospect for the national team who could bowl in excess of 150 km/h. In May 2018, he was one of twenty players to be awarded a new contract for the 2018–19 season by New Zealand Cricket.

In February 2021, Milne was bought by the Mumbai Indians ahead of the 2021 Indian Premier League and in June returned to Kent for the 2021 T20 Blast, his fourth spell with the county. He took a hat-trick during the competition against Surrey from the final three balls of the match. In August 2021, Milne was named as injury cover in New Zealand's squad for the 2021 ICC Men's T20 World Cup.

In February 2022, he was bought by the Chennai Super Kings in the auction for the 2022 Indian Premier League tournament but was ruled out after a few matches. In April 2022, he was bought by the Birmingham Phoenix for the 2022 season of The Hundred in England.

In March 2023, Milne was named in New Zealand's T20I squad for their series against Sri Lanka. On 5 April 2023, he took his maiden five-wicket haul in international cricket, helping his team win the second T20I by 9 wickets.

In September 2023, Milne was ruled out of the ODI series against England, due to a hamstring injury that occurred during a training session, effectively ruling out chances of him making the World Cup squad. He returned later that month against Bangladesh, taking four wickets in the only match he played.
