= Benny Howell =

English cricketer (born 1988)

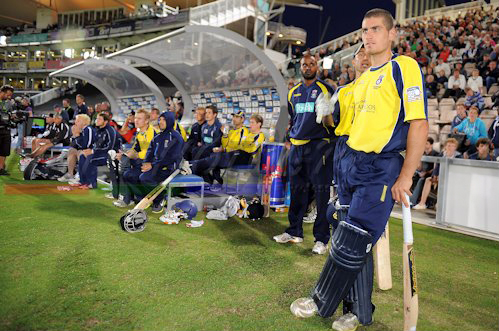
- Howell waiting to bat in a Twenty20 match for Hampshire

Personal information
- Full name: Benny Alexander Cameron Howell
- Born: 5 October 1988 (age 38); Bordeaux, France
- Nickname: Trowell, Growler
- Height: 6 ft 0 in (1.83 m)
- Batting: Right-handed
- Bowling: Right-arm medium
- Role: All-rounder
- Relatives: Nick Howell

Domestic team information
- Years: Team
- 2009–2011: Hampshire (squad no. 37)
- 2012–2022: Gloucestershire (squad no. 13)
- 2016–2017: Khulna Titans
- 2019: Rangpur Riders
- 2020/21: Melbourne Renegades
- 2021–2025: Birmingham Phoenix
- 2022: Chattogram Challengers (squad no. 13)
- 2022: Peshawar Zalmi (squad no. 13)
- 2023–2025: Hampshire
- 2023: St Kitts & Nevis Patriots
- 2024: Sylhet Strikers
- 2026: Nottinghamshire (squad no. 10)
- 2026: Sunrisers Leeds

Career statistics
Competition	FC	LA	T20
Matches	86	87	281
Runs scored	3,378	2,090	3,405
Batting average	27.46	35.42	21.68
100s/50s	2/18	1/13	0/9
Top score	163	122	62*
Balls bowled	6,455	3,103	5,060
Wickets	96	79	266
Bowling average	33.56	34.15	23.61
5 wickets in innings	1	0	1
10 wickets in match	0	0	0
Best bowling	5/57	3/37	5/18
Catches/stumpings	52/–	29/–	118/–
- Source: ESPNcricinfo, 15 August 2026

Benny Alexander Cameron Howell (born 5 October 1988) is an English first-class cricketer. Howell is a right-handed batsman who bowls right-arm medium-fast for Nottinghamshire.

He was born in Bordeaux, France, and was educated at The Oratory School in Oxfordshire.

== Hampshire County Cricket Club ==
After spending several seasons in the Hampshire Second XI, Howell made his first team debut for Hampshire against Leicestershire in a List A match in the Clydesdale Bank 40 in August 2010. His second List A match came in the return fixture held at Grace Road, Leicester. Hampshire won the 2010 Friends Provident t20, though Howell played no part in the competition. This would normally have qualified Hampshire and runners-up Somerset a place in the 2010 Champions League Twenty20. However, the tournament clashed with the end of the English domestic season, making Hampshire unable to take part. Instead, Hampshire were granted a place alongside Somerset in the 2011 Caribbean Twenty20. It was in this tournament that Howell made his Twenty20 debut in during Hampshire's group match against Canada. He played all of Hampshire's fixtures in the tournament, including the final against Trinidad and Tobago, which Hampshire lost.

The 2011 English domestic season saw Howell become a regular feature in Hampshire ccc limited-overs squads, mostly in List A cricket, though he also appeared in just under half of Hampshire's group matches in the 2011 Friends Provident t20. He got off to a quiet start in Hampshire's first match of the 2011 Clydesdale Bank 40 against Surrey, but in their following fixture in the competition he struck his maiden half century, scoring 66 runs. Two games later, he scored his maiden century against Surrey at The Oval, making a quickfire 122 from 113 balls. Howell ended the one day season as Hampshire's top run scorer. Following this match he made his first-class debut against Lancashire in the County Championship at the Rose Bowl. Howell continued his good form from the previous limited overs fixture by scoring 71 in Hampshire County Cricket Club second-innings, after being forced to follow-on from their first-innings, in which Howell was dismissed for a three-ball duck by Kyle Hogg. This was his only first-class appearance that season. Hampshire's season was one characterised by struggle, following his good run of form, Howell's season levelled out. He made just one further half century in the Clydesdale Bank 40, against Northamptonshire, while his handful of Twenty20 appearances bought him limited success.

Following the 2011 season, Howell announced in November that he was looking for opportunities away from Hampshire, expressing an interest in finding a county where he was assured of regular appearances in four-day cricket. During the English winter he played cricket in Melbourne, Australia, close to where his parents live, for Essendon Cricket Club in the Victorian Premier League. He chose to leave Hampshire in January 2012.

He rejoined the club on a three-year contract for the 2023 English season.

== Gloucestershire County Cricket Club ==
At the start of the 2012 season he joined Gloucestershire, and was called up to make his debut in a first-class match against Kent in the County Championship after making a double hundred for the 2's 2 days prior to his call up. He has made a strong start in Gloucestershire's CB40 campaign with scores of 72(51) against The Netherlands and 45*(48) against Middlesex and 89(93) against Northants. In July 2012, he signed a two-year contract with Gloucestershire for his impressive performances during the trial period at the club.

Howell signed a 2-year extension to his contract on 15 October 2013 having played in all Gloucestershire's County Championship matches and the majority of their limited over games.

Howell has continued to be one of the main players and Gloucestershire with his pivotal role as the club's main allrounder. Howell got married in early July 2015 and has been is sublime form for Gloucestershire since tying the knot. He was the first player ever for Gloucestershire to have a double wicket maiden in a t20 match. He managed this feat against his former club Hampshire County Cricket Club in which he also scored the winning runs and was man of the match. Hampshire have tried to re sign Howell but at the end of July he extended his contract with Gloucestershire for another 2 years. Howell also made his maiden first-class hundred against Leicestershire at Cheltenham after tying the knot.

On 6 September 2015 Howell helped his side Beat Yorkshire Vikings in the semi-final of the Royal London One Day Cup with a strong bowling performance. (3-37) . Gloucestershire won the Royal One Day Cup Final beating a strong surrey side by 7 runs. This was one of the closest finals in the competition's history

In 2016 Benny Howell was the leading wicket taker in the Natwest T20 Blast. He was rewarded by signing a new 3-year contract with Gloucestershire . His consistent performances in T20 has attracted the eyes of some big T20 competitions. In October 2018, he was named in the squad for the Rangpur Riders team, following the draft for the 2018–19 Bangladesh Premier League.

In 2019 he signed a three-year contract extension with Gloucestershire.

Such is his skill that he claims to have 50 different varieties of slower balls. He has developed them through watching baseball pitchers and practises them in his back garden with his dog.

Howell has spoken of his experience of ADHD and how medication has helped him to live with the condition, He said that at school "I was always known as the ‘weird kid’....I was constantly in trouble. Exploring where I shouldn't explore, making noise in class, running down the corridor...." He says that sport was an escape.

== Franchise cricket ==
During the 2019 Bangladesh Premier League Howell impressed with his miserly bowling displays, with his subtle varieties very much suited to the slower Bangladeshi wickets. In his 8 matches he picked up 6 wickets at an impressive economy rate of 5.64. His contributions were not limited to the ball with a vital 53* off 28 (featuring 5 sixes) showing his prowess with the bat. This was made no less significant by the fact that the opposition bowling attack featured three greats of the format in Thisara Perera, Wahab Riaz and Shahid Afridi. So good were his performances that AB de Villiers encouraged him to join the IPL auction in 2020. However, he went unsold. He was selected again for the Bangladesh Premier League, this time by the Chattogram Challengers in the 2022 season.

Howell was selected for Birmingham Phoenix for the inaugural season of The Hundred, where he impressed as his side made the final. Taking eleven wickets at an average of 18.54, he was named in a number of Teams of the Tournament. He was retained by the Phoenix for the 2022 season and 2023 season.

In February 2022, he was bought by the Punjab Kings in the auction for the 2022 Indian Premier League tournament. In the same month, he joined Pakistani Super League side Peshawar Zalmi for the PSL Playoffs.

== Personal life ==
Benny's brother Nick Howell is a professional real tennis player, who won the real tennis French Open in 2023.
