= Liam Livingstone =

English cricketer (born 1993)

Personal information
- Full name: Liam Stephen Livingstone
- Born: 4 August 1993 (age 33); Barrow-in-Furness, Cumbria, England
- Batting: Right-handed
- Bowling: Right-arm off break, leg break
- Role: Batting all-rounder

International information
- National side: England (2017–present)
- Only Test (cap 709): 1 December 2022 v Pakistan
- ODI debut (cap 258): 26 March 2021 v India
- Last ODI: 1 March 2025 v South Africa
- ODI shirt no.: 23
- T20I debut (cap 80): 23 June 2017 v South Africa
- Last T20I: 2 February 2025 v India
- T20I shirt no.: 23

Domestic team information
- Years: Team
- 2015–present: Lancashire
- 2019: Karachi Kings
- 2019–2021: Rajasthan Royals
- 2019: Cape Town Blitz
- 2019/20–2020/21: Perth Scorchers
- 2020, 2022: Peshawar Zalmi
- 2021–2025: Birmingham Phoenix
- 2022–2024: Punjab Kings
- 2024: MI Cape Town
- 2025: Royal Challengers Bengaluru
- 2025: Pretoria Capitals
- 2026: Sunrisers Hyderabad
- 2026: Durban's Super Giants
- 2026: London Spirit
- 2026: Glasgow Cosmic

Career statistics
Competition	Test	ODI	T20I	FC
Matches	1	39	60	65
Runs scored	16	932	955	3,152
Batting average	16.00	31.06	25.13	37.08
100s/50s	0/0	1/4	1/2	7/15
Top score	9	124*	103	224
Balls bowled	–	968	576	3,645
Wickets	–	25	33	49
Bowling average	–	39.28	25.39	34.87
5 wickets in innings	–	0	0	2
10 wickets in match	–	0	0	0
Best bowling	–	3/16	3/17	6/52
Catches/stumpings	0/–	15/–	26/–	75/–
- Source: ESPNcricinfo, 21 June 2026

Liam Stephen Livingstone (born 4 August 1993) is an English international cricketer who has captained the England ODI team. He is a right-handed batter and spin bowler, capable of bowling both right-arm leg and off spin. He also plays for Lancashire in domestic cricket. He represents London Spirit in The Hundred, where he is the captain of the team, and was awarded the "Most Valuable Player" in the inaugural edition of the tournament. Livingstone was a member of the England team that won the 2022 T20 World Cup.

== Career ==
On 19 April 2015, Livingstone gained media coverage after scoring 350 off 138 balls for his club team Nantwich, reported to be one of the highest individual scores in one-day history.

Livingstone made his first-class debut for Lancashire in the first game of the 2016 season. On 24 April 2017, after leading Lancashire as stand-in captain to their first victory of the 2017 season, he was awarded his county cap. On 30 November 2017, he was appointed as club captain for the 2018 season, replacing Steven Croft.

In June 2017, Livingstone was named in England's Twenty20 International (T20I) squad for the series against South Africa. He made his T20I debut for England against South Africa on 23 June 2017. On 10 January 2018 Livingstone received his first call up to the England Test Squad for their upcoming two-match series against New Zealand following a strong performance for the England Lions team during the Ashes Winter of 2017/18, in which national selector James Whitaker said that Livingstone had been a 'standout performer'.

In December 2018, Livingstone was bought by the Rajasthan Royals in the player auction for the 2019 Indian Premier League. In September 2019, he was named in the squad for the Cape Town Blitz team for the 2019 Mzansi Super League tournament.

In November 2019, he signed with Perth Scorchers for the 2019-20 Big Bash League tournament. He was released by the Rajasthan Royals ahead of the 2020 IPL auction.

On 29 May 2020, Livingstone was named in a 55-man group of players to begin training ahead of international fixtures starting in England following the COVID-19 pandemic. On 9 July 2020, Livingstone was included in England's 24-man squad to start training behind closed doors for the One Day International (ODI) series against Ireland. On 27 July 2020, Livingstone was named as one of three reserve players in England's squad for the ODI series. On 31 July 2020, Livingstone replaced Joe Denly in England's ODI squad, after Denly suffered back spasms before the first match. In November 2020, Livingstone was named in England's ODI squad for their series against South Africa.

In February 2021, Livingstone was bought by the Rajasthan Royals in the IPL auction ahead of the 2021 Indian Premier League. The following month, Livingstone was named in England's ODI squad for their series against India. Livingstone made his ODI debut for England on 26 March 2021, against India, averaging 63 across the series.

In June 2021, Livingstone was selected in the England squads for both the ODI and the T20 squads against Sri Lanka. He averaged 43 in the T20 series and claimed his maiden wicket in the format, subsequently being recognised with the player of the match award in the second game of the series. After opening in the first game of the ODI series he made way for the returning Jason Roy for the rest of the tour.

In July 2021, in the opening match against Pakistan, Livingstone scored his first century in a T20I match, with 103 runs, becoming just the third man to score a T20I hundred for England. He also scored the fastest fifty and the fastest century by an England batsman in T20Is, from 17 balls and 42 balls respectively. He also smashed a 122-metre six in the second T20I match against Pakistan. In September 2021, Livingstone was named in England's squad for the 2021 ICC Men's T20 World Cup.

In December 2021, Livingstone signed an extension to his Lancashire deal that will see him remain at the club until at least 2024. In February 2022, he was bought by the Punjab Kings in the auction for the 2022 Indian Premier League tournament. He hit the longest six of the tournament (117m).

In April 2022, he was bought by the Birmingham Phoenix for the 2022 season of The Hundred.

In June 2022, in the first ODI against the Netherlands, Livingstone scored a 50 off 17 balls, tied for the second fastest ever in One-Day cricket. Together as a team, England would score 498/4, the highest ODI score in the history of cricket.

In August 2022, Liam Livingstone was drafted by MI Cape Town, a franchise owned by Reliance Industries’ IndiaWin Sports for US$500,000 in the inaugural season of the SA20 league. He is the highest-paid drafted player in the league along with Jos Buttler.

In September 2022, Livingstone was named in the England squad for the 2022 ICC Men's T20 World Cup, which went on to win the tournament for an overall second time. He scored a total of 55 runs and took 3 wickets in 6 matches throughout the tournament.

On 12 October 2022, Livingstone earned his maiden Test call-up for the English tour to Pakistan in 2022-23. In the same tour's first Test, on 1 December 2022, Livingstone made his Test debut for England.

In May 2024, he was named in England's squad for the 2024 ICC Men's T20 World Cup tournament. England's first match that tournament against Scotland was washed out and Livingstone did not get the chance to bowl or bat. In England's second match that tournament, against Australia, Livingstone took the crucial wicket of Mitchell Marsh, his only wicket in the 2 overs he bowled at the economy rate of 7.50. That same match, he managed to make 15 runs off 12 balls, but despite England's effort, they lost. Against Oman, Livingstone did not get a chance to bowl or bat. Against Namibia, Livingstone made a quickfire 13 off just 4 balls, but did not get a chance to bowl. England's performance in the group stage allowed them to edge out Scotland to secure a place in the Super Eight. In England's first Super Eight match against West Indies, he took a wicket in his only over at the expensive economy of 20 runs. He did not get a chance to bat. In England's second Super Eight match against South Africa, he did not get a chance to bowl, but played a crucial innings, making 33 runs off 17 balls, with 3 4s and 2 6s, nearly winning the match for England but was caught by Tristan Stubbs off Kagiso Rabada's bowling. England lost the match, being edged out by 7 runs, despite Livingstone's valiant efforts.

Livingstone was named as stand-in captain for England's white-ball tour of the West Indies in October 2024 after Jos Buttler was ruled out due to injury. He made his maiden ODI century in the second match of the series, scoring 124 not out, including hitting nine 6s and five 4s, to lead his team to a five-wicket win with 15 balls to spare.

Liam Livingstone was bought by Sunrisers Hyderabad for the 2026 Indian Premier League season.
