= Tom Helm (cricketer) =

English cricketer

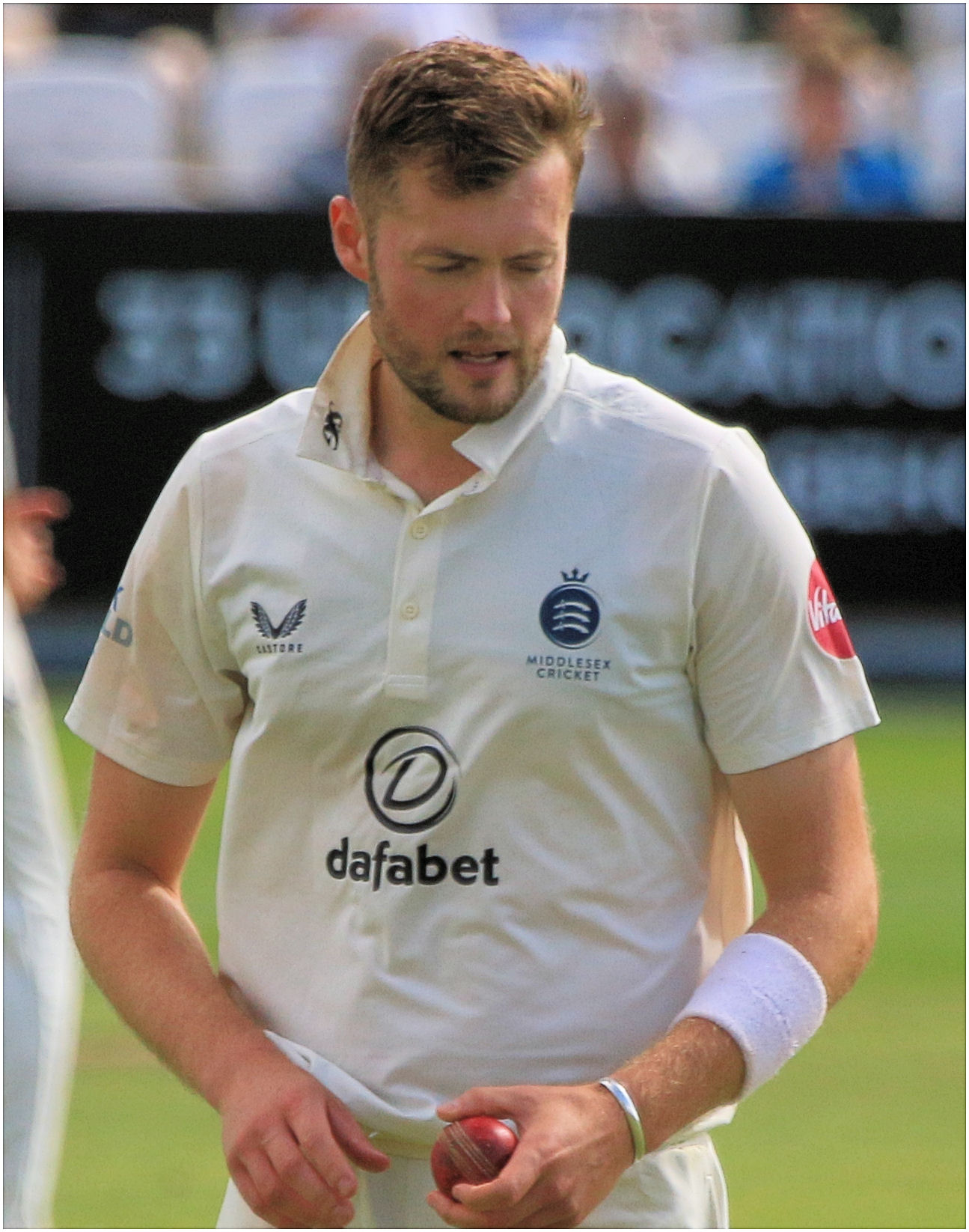
- Helm in 2024

Personal information
- Full name: Thomas George Helm
- Born: 7 May 1994 (age 32); Aylesbury, Buckinghamshire, England
- Batting: Right-handed
- Bowling: Right-arm medium-fast
- Role: Bowler

Domestic team information
- Years: Team
- 2012–present: Middlesex (squad no. 7)
- 2014: → Glamorgan (on loan)
- 2023–2026: Birmingham Phoenix
- 2026: → Leicestershire (on loan)
- FC debut: 17 September 2013 Middlesex v Yorkshire
- LA debut: 20 June 2013 Middlesex v Yorkshire

Career statistics
Competition	FC	LA	T20
Matches	73	43	129
Runs scored	1,351	269	293
Batting average	18.50	14.94	10.46
100s/50s	0/4	0/0	0/0
Top score	64	40	28*
Balls bowled	12,031	1,957	2,555
Wickets	214	60	142
Bowling average	30.41	31.13	27.33
5 wickets in innings	5	1	1
10 wickets in match	0	0	0
Best bowling	6/110	5/33	5/11
Catches/stumpings	38/–	15/–	28/–
- Source: Cricinfo, 27 September 2026

Thomas George Helm (born 7 May 1994) is a cricketer who plays for Middlesex County Cricket Club. A fast bowler from Buckinghamshire, Helm signed for Middlesex in June 2012 when he was 18.

Angus Fraser, Middlesex's managing director of cricket, said of Helm's 2 1/2-year contract deal:

"Tom is an exciting young fast bowler and we are delighted to have him on board. He is the fifth local boy we have signed in the past couple of years - Ravi Patel, Adam Rossington, Gurjit Sandhu and Ollie Wilkin are the others - and we hope that, along with these other cricketers, he will play a major role in Middlesex cricket in years to come.”

He made his List A debut against Yorkshire in June 2013. In a rain-affected match, he didn't bat and had yet to bowl before the match came to an early end. Three days later, Helm played his second List A match against Unicorns where he took 3–27. He suffered a stress fracture which prevented him from reaching his full potential as a youth cricketer.

In the summer of 2020, Helm was named in a 55-man group of players to begin training ahead of international fixtures starting in England following the COVID-19 pandemic. He was included in England's 24-man group for behind closed doors training for the One Day International (ODI) series against Ireland, though he did not make the final squad. In November 2020, he was named as a reserve player in England's squad for their series against South Africa.

In July 2021, Helm was named in England's ODI squad for their series against Pakistan, after the original squad for the tour was forced to withdraw following positive tests for COVID-19. In September 2022, he was named in England's T20I squad for the tour of Pakistan.

In May 2026, Helm joined Leicestershire on a two-week loan.
