= Will Smeed =

English cricketer (born 2001)

Personal information
- Full name: William Conrad Francis Smeed
- Born: 26 October 2001 (age 25); Cambridge, Cambridgeshire, England
- Batting: Right-handed
- Bowling: Right-arm off break
- Role: Batsman

Domestic team information
- Years: Team
- 2020–present: Somerset (squad no. 23)
- 2021–2026: Birmingham Phoenix
- 2022–2024: Quetta Gladiators
- 2023: St Kitts & Nevis Patriots
- 2024: MI Emirates
- 2024/25–2026: Pretoria Capitals
- First-class debut: 10 April 2026 Somerset v Essex
- List A debut: 14 July 2022; England Lions v South Africa

Career statistics
| Competition | FC | LA | T20 |
|---|---|---|---|
| Matches | 4 | 4 | 152 |
| Runs scored | 139 | 110 | 3,978 |
| Batting average | 23.16 | 27.50 | 27.43 |
| 100s/50s | 0/0 | 0/1 | 1/28 |
| Top score | 39 | 84 | 101* |
| Catches/stumpings | 0/– | 2/– | 69/– |
- Source: Cricinfo, 9 August 2026

William Conrad Francis Smeed (born 26 October 2001) is an English cricketer. He made his Twenty20 debut on 11 September 2020, for Somerset in the 2020 T20 Blast. On 10 August 2022 he became the first player to score a century in The Hundred (101* from 50 balls) for Birmingham Phoenix vs Southern Brave.

== Biography ==
Smeed was a prep school pupil at Millfield School and played rugby, football, hockey, tennis and competed in the hurdles, as well as playing cricket. From ages 13 to 18 Smeed was educated at independent school King's College, Taunton in Somerset, where he was a part of their cricket programme. He studied maths, further maths, chemistry and physics to A Level, achieving an A* in each subject. He is studying an undergraduate Open University degree in maths and economics.

In April 2022, he was bought by the Birmingham Phoenix for the 2022 season of The Hundred. He made his List A debut on 14 July 2022, for the England Lions during South Africa's tour of England.

In November 2022, Smeed announced he was to give up red ball cricket to focus solely on the shorter forms of the game. Coming at such an early stage of his career, at the age of 21, some have seen the decision as being indicative of the decline of red ball cricket. Barney Ronay, in The Guardian, noted that Smeed “"..who will make a wonderful living from being able to polo mallet sixes into the stands, has retired from red ball cricket having never played a game of red ball cricket, because, frankly, only one of these things looks like the future." In March 2025, Smeed reversed his decision and signed a new all-formats contract with Somerset. He signed a contract extension tying him into the club until at least the end of the 2027 season in December 2025.

In April 2026, Smeed made his first-class debut for Somerset as an injury substitute, after a hand injury for opening batter Tom Kohler-Cadmore.
