= Birmingham Phoenix =

100-ball cricket team in Birmingham, UK

Personnel
- Captain: Ellyse Perry (women); Donovan Ferreira (men)
- Coach: Alistair Maiden (women); Ian Bell (men)
- Overseas players: Annerie Dercksen; Fatima Sana; Lucy Hamilton; Alana King; Ellyse Perry; Kayla Reyneke; (women); Ben Dwarshuis; Donovan Ferreira; Mustafizur Rahman; Mitchell Owen; Usman Tariq; (men)
- Owner: Warwickshire County Cricket Club (50.4%); Knighthead Capital Management LLC (48.4%); Jude Bellingham (1.2%)

Team information
- Colours
- Founded: 2019; 7 years ago
- Home ground: Edgbaston
- Capacity: 25,000

History
- No. of titles: 0
- Official website: Birmingham Phoenix
The Hundred kit

Birmingham Phoenix are a franchise 100-ball cricket team based in the city of Birmingham. The team represents the historic counties of Warwickshire and Worcestershire in the newly founded The Hundred competition, which began its inaugural season on 21 July 2021, during the English and Welsh cricket season. Both the men's and women's teams play at Edgbaston.

== History ==
In July 2019, it was announced the Edgbaston-based franchise would be known as Birmingham Phoenix. The team revealed that former Australian batsman Andrew McDonald would be the men's team's first coach, and would be McDonald will be assisted by Daniel Vettori, Jim Troughton, and Alex Gidman. In September Ben Sawyer was appointed the first coach of the women's team.

The inaugural Hundred draft took place in October 2019 and saw the Phoenix claim Amy Jones as the women's headline draftee and Chris Woakes as their headline men's player. They were joined by England internationals Kirstie Gordon and Moeen Ali and Worcestershire's Pat Brown.

As part of the 2025 Hundred sale, the ECB gave Warwickshire County Cricket Club a 51% stake in the franchise with the remaining 49% sold in an auction process. Knighthead Capital Management LLC purchased 49% of the franchise with Warwickshire County Cricket Club retaining their stake. They took operational control on 1 October 2025.

== Grounds ==
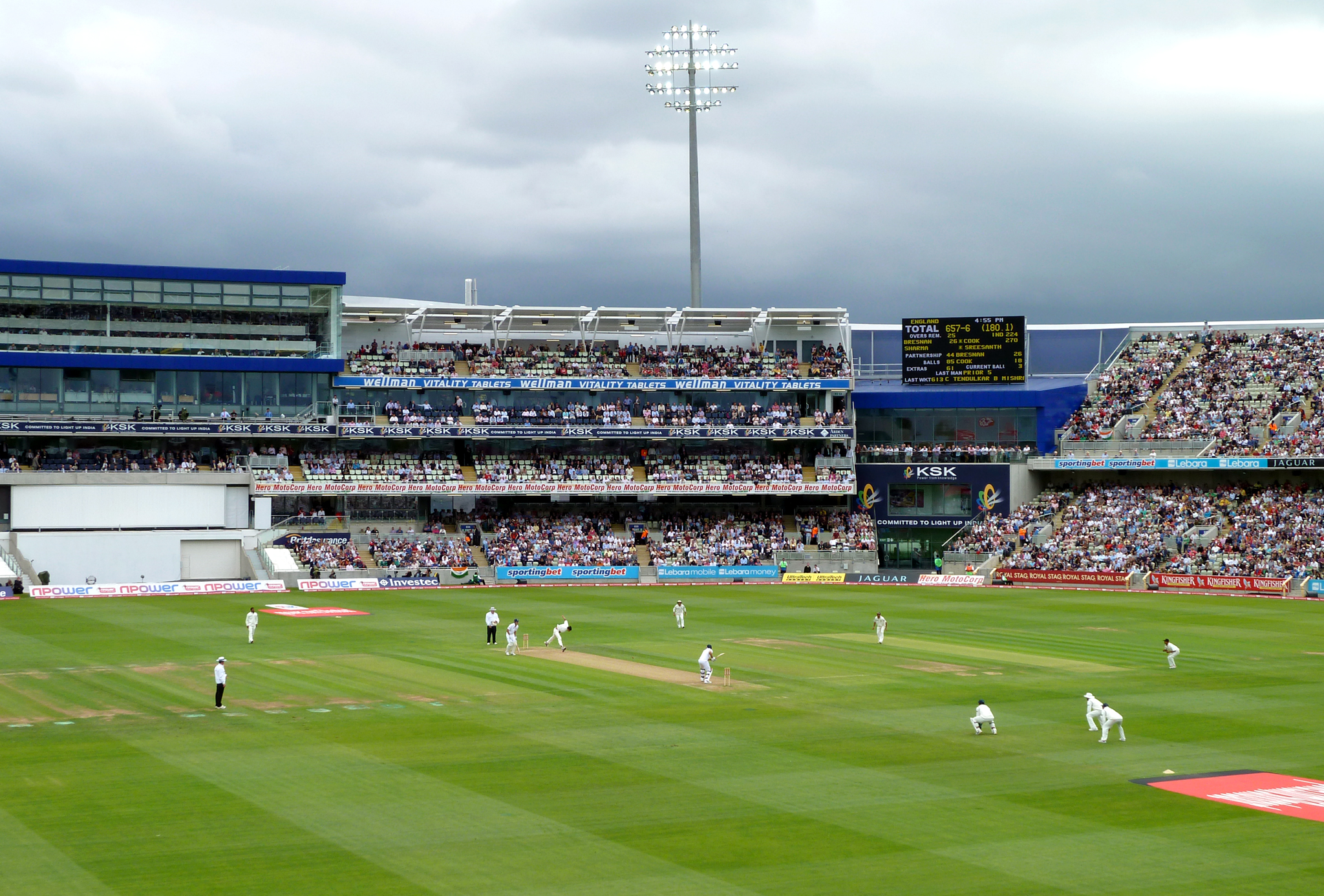
Edgbaston

Both the Birmingham Phoenix men's and women's teams play at the home of Warwickshire County Cricket Club, Edgbaston Cricket Ground, in the Edgbaston area of Birmingham. The women's team had been due to play at the home of Worcestershire County Cricket Club, New Road, Worcester but both teams were brought together at the same ground as a result of the COVID-19 pandemic.

== Current squads ==
- **Bold** denotes players with international caps.
- * denotes a player who is unavailable for rest of the season.

=== Women's team ===
No.	Name	Nationality	Date of birth (age)	Batting style	Bowling style	Notes
Batters
6	**Emma Lamb**	England	16 December 1997 (age 28)	Right-handed	Right-arm off break	
12	**Tammy Beaumont**	England	11 March 1991 (age 35)	Right-handed	Right-arm off break	England central contract
22	Davina Perrin	England	8 September 2006 (age 20)	Right-handed	Right-arm medium	
—	Meg Austin	England	7 September 2004 (age 22)	Right-handed	Right-arm leg break	Replacement player
—	Cordelia Griffith	England	19 September 1995 (age 31)	Right-handed	Right-arm medium	Ruled out through injury
All-rounders
8	**Ellyse Perry**	Australia	3 November 1990 (age 36)	Right-handed	Right-arm medium	Captain; Overseas player
14	**Fatima Sana**	Pakistan	8 November 2001 (age 25)	Right-handed	Right-arm medium	Overseas player; Wildcard player
53	**Kayla Reyneke**	South Africa	21 October 2005 (age 21)	Right-handed	Right-arm off break	Overseas player; Replacement player
64	**Alice Capsey**	England	11 August 2004 (age 22)	Right-handed	Right-arm off break	England central contract
77	**Annerie Dercksen**	South Africa	26 April 2001 (age 25)	Right-handed	Right-arm medium	Overseas player
Wicket-keepers
67	Jemima Spence	England	6 July 2006 (age 20)	Right-handed	—	
Pace bowlers
9	Mary Taylor	England	7 October 2004 (age 22)	Right-handed	Right-arm medium	Wildcard player
18	Eva Gray	England	24 May 2000 (age 26)	Right-handed	Right-arm medium	
24	**Lauren Filer**	England	22 December 2000 (age 25)	Right-handed	Right-arm fast-medium	England central contract
—	**Lucy Hamilton**	Australia	8 May 2006 (age 20)	Left-handed	Left-arm fast-medium	Ruled out
—	Esmae MacGregor	England	31 July 2004 (age 22)	Right-handed	Right-arm medium	
Spin bowlers
15	Phoebe Brett	England	5 June 2008 (age 18)	Right-handed	Slow left-arm orthodox	
27	**Alana King**	Australia	22 November 1995 (age 30)	Right-handed	Right-arm leg break	Overseas player
50	**Linsey Smith**	England	10 March 1995 (age 31)	Left-handed	Slow left-arm orthodox	England central contract
—	Eve O'Neill	England	11 May 2008 (age 18)	Right-handed	Right-arm off break	

=== Men's team ===
No.	Name	Nationality	Date of birth (age)	Batting style	Bowling style	Notes
Batters
5	Joe Weatherley	England	19 January 1997 (age 29)	Right-handed	Right-arm off break	Replacement player
22	**Donovan Ferreira**	South Africa	21 July 1998 (age 28)	Right-handed	Right-arm off break	Captain; Overseas player
26	Will Smeed	England	26 October 2001 (age 25)	Right-handed	Right-arm off break	
32	Laurie Evans	England	12 October 1987 (age 39)	Right-handed	Right-arm medium	
58	Sean Dickson	South Africa	2 September 1991 (age 35)	Right-handed	Right-arm medium	UK passport; Wildcard player
All-rounders
2	**Jacob Bethell**	England	23 October 2003 (age 23)	Left-handed	Slow left-arm orthodox	England central contract; Ruled out through injury
8	Jordan Thompson	England	9 October 1996 (age 30)	Left-handed	Right-arm fast-medium	
16	**Mitchell Owen**	Australia	16 September 2001 (age 25)	Right-handed	Right-arm medium	Overseas player
53	**Rehan Ahmed**	England	13 August 2004 (age 22)	Right-handed	Right-arm leg break	England central contract
—	Ethan Brookes	England	23 May 2001 (age 25)	Right-handed	Right-arm medium	Ruled out through injury
—	**Matt Montgomery**	Germany	10 May 2000 (age 26)	Right-handed	Right-arm off break	Replacement player
Wicket-keepers
33	Joe Clarke	England	26 May 1996 (age 30)	Right-handed	—	
Pace bowlers
7	**Saqib Mahmood**	England	25 February 1997 (age 29)	Right-handed	Right-arm fast	
9	Tom Helm	England	7 May 1994 (age 32)	Right-handed	Right-arm fast-medium	Wildcard player
25	Chris Wood	England	27 June 1990 (age 36)	Right-handed	Left-arm fast-medium	
27	**Ben Dwarshuis**	Australia	23 June 1994 (age 32)	Left-handed	Left-arm fast-medium	Overseas player; Replacement player
44	**Scott Currie**	Scotland	2 May 2001 (age 25)	Right-handed	Right-arm fast-medium	
—	**Mustafizur Rahman**	Bangladesh	6 September 1995 (age 31)	Left-handed	Left-arm fast-medium	Overseas player; Ruled out through injury
Spin bowlers
76	**Usman Tariq**	Pakistan	7 June 1995 (age 31)	Right-handed	Right-arm off break	Overseas player

== Honours ==
=== Women's honours ===
- Third place: 2021

=== Men's honours ===
- Runners-up: 2021
- Third place: 2024

== Seasons ==
=== Women's team ===
Season	Group stage							Playoff stage		Ref.
Season	Pld	W	L	T	NR	Pts	Pos	Pld	Pos	Ref.
2021	8	4	4	0	0	8	3rd	1 (Note: Birmingham Phoenix women qualified for the eliminator in 2021. They played one match, losing the playoff for the final against Oval Invincibles by 20 runs.)	3rd	
2022	6	3	3	0	0	6	4th	Did not progress		
2023	8	0	7	0	1	1	8th	Did not progress		
2024	8	3	4	0	1	7	7th	Did not progress		
2025	8	2	6	0	0	8	7th	Did not progress		
2026	8	2	5	0	1	10	7th	Did not progress		

=== Men's team ===
Season	Group stage							Playoff stage		Ref.
Season	Pld	W	L	T	NR	Pts	Pos	Pld	Pos	Ref.
2021	8	6	2	0	0	12	1st	1 (Note: Birmingham Phoenix men finished top of the group stage and qualified automatically for the final in 2021. They lost the final against Southern Brave by 32 runs.)	2nd	
2022	8	5	3	0	0	10	4th	Did not progress		
2023	8	2	4	0	2	6	6th	Did not progress		
2024	8	6	2	0	0	12	2nd	1 (Note: Birmingham Phoenix men finished second in the group stage. They lost the eliminator against Southern Brave in the Super Five after a tied match.)	3rd	
2025	8	3	5	0	0	12	5th	Did not progress		
2026	8	1	7	0	0	4	8th	Did not progress		

== See also ==
- List of Birmingham Phoenix cricketers
- List of cricket grounds in England and Wales
- List of Test cricket grounds
