= Alicia Presland =

English cricketer (born 1999)

Personal information
- Full name: Alicia Demi Presland
- Born: 28 September 1999 (age 27); Huntingdon, Cambridgeshire, England
- Batting: Right-handed
- Bowling: Right-arm medium
- Role: All-rounder

Domestic team information
- Years: Team
- 2015–2016: Cambridgeshire and Huntingdonshire
- 2017–2020: Northamptonshire
- 2020–2022: Lightning
- 2021: Lincolnshire
- 2021: Trent Rockets
- 2022–present: Northamptonshire

Career statistics
Competition	WLA	WT20
Matches	29	31
Runs scored	395	491
Batting average	17.95	24.55
100s/50s	0/2	0/3
Top score	70	78
Balls bowled	864	159
Wickets	28	12
Bowling average	20.50	11.41
5 wickets in innings	0	0
10 wickets in match	0	0
Best bowling	3/25	4/16
Catches/stumpings	13/–	12/–
- Source: CricketArchive, 23 October 2023

Alicia Demi Presland (born 28 September 1999) is an English cricketer who currently plays for Northamptonshire. An all-rounder, she is a right-handed batter and right-arm medium bowler. She previously played for Cambridgeshire and Huntingdonshire, Lincolnshire, Lightning and Trent Rockets.

== Early life ==
Presland was born on 28 September 1999 in Huntingdon, Cambridgeshire.

== Domestic career ==
Presland made her county debut in 2015, for Cambridgeshire and Huntingdonshire against Lincolnshire, in which she took 2/11 from 7 overs. In her third match, she hit her maiden county half-century, scoring 50 against Northumberland. In 2016, Presland played two Twenty20 Cup matches for Cambridgeshire, as the county competes on its own in the Twenty20 format.

Presland joined Northamptonshire ahead of the 2017 season. In her first season with her new side, she was their leading run-scorer in the Twenty20 Cup, with 224 runs at an average of 44.80, including her T20 high score, 78 made against her former side Cambridgeshire. In the 2019 Women's County Championship, Presland achieved her List A high score and best bowling figures, scoring 70 against Cambridgeshire and Huntingdonshire and taking 3/25 against Hertfordshire. In 2021, Presland joined Lincolnshire for the Twenty20 Cup. She scored 60 off 42 balls on debut for the side, a victory over Leicestershire. She took six wickets for the side in the competition, including taking her T20 best bowling figures of 4/16 against Northamptonshire. She re-joined Northamptonshire during the 2022 season, playing in the East of England Women's County Championship. She played eight matches for Northamptonshire in the 2023 Women's Twenty20 Cup, taking five wickets at an average of 10.00.

In 2020, Presland played for Lightning in the Rachael Heyhoe Flint Trophy. She appeared in four matches, taking 5 wickets at an average of 22.80. Her best performance came against Central Sparks, in which she took 3/26 from 10 overs. She was included in the Lightning and Trent Rockets squads in 2021, but did not play a match for either side. In 2022, Presland played one match for Lightning in the Charlotte Edwards Cup as a concussion substitute, and one match in the Rachael Heyhoe Flint Trophy.
