= Ella Claridge =

English-American cricketer (born 2002)

Personal information
- Full name: Ella Caterina Claridge
- Born: 28 September 2002 (age 24); Aylesbury, Buckinghamshire, England
- Batting: Right-handed
- Bowling: Right-arm medium
- Role: Wicket-keeper

International information
- National side: United States
- ODI debut (cap 14): 17 October 2024 v Zimbabwe
- Last ODI: 28 October 2024 v Zimbabwe
- T20I debut (cap 39): 10 March 2025 v Canada
- Last T20I: 11 March 2025 v Brazil

Domestic team information
- Years: Team
- 2017–2022: Buckinghamshire
- 2021–2022: Trent Rockets
- 2021–present: The Blaze
- 2023–2024: Leicestershire

Career statistics
Competition	WODI	WLA	WT20
Matches	5	34	52
Runs scored	79	749	894
Batting average	19.75	27.74	21.80
100s/50s	0/0	0/3	0/6
Top score	49*	71	96
Catches/stumpings	2/–	14/8	10/11
- Source: CricketArchive, 30 October 2024

Ella Caterina Claridge (born 28 September 2002) is an English-born cricketer who currently plays internationally for the USA and domestically for The Blaze. She plays as a right-handed batter and wicket-keeper. In 2021 and 2022 she was in the Trent Rockets squad for The Hundred, and was later drafted by Northern Superchargers for the 2024 season.

== Domestic career ==
Claridge made her county debut in 2017, for Buckinghamshire against Cambridgeshire and Huntingdonshire, in which she top-scored with 57 from 52 balls in a 79-run victory. The following season, 2018, she was Buckinghamshire's leading run-scorer in the Twenty20 Cup, with 196 runs including two half-centuries, both against Dorset. Claridge was again Buckinghamshire's leading run-scorer in the 2019 Women's Twenty20 Cup, with 100 runs, including 51 made against Lincolnshire. Claridge's 166 runs in the 2021 Women's Twenty20 Cup again made her Buckinghamshire's leading run-scorer for the competition, including two half-centuries, made against Norfolk and Huntingdonshire. She was again Buckinghamshire's leading run-scorer in the 2022 Women's Twenty20 Cup, with 199 runs at an average of 24.87. Against Huntingdonshire, Claridge made her Twenty20 high score, scoring 96 from 61 deliveries. Ahead of the 2023 season, she joined Leicestershire, for the 2023 Women's Twenty20 Cup, playing one match, whilst remaining with Buckinghamshire for the South Central Counties Cup.

In 2021, Claridge was included in Lightning's Academy squad for the season. She was also included in the Trent Rockets squad for the 2021 season, but did not play a match. Claridge made her debut for the senior Lightning team on 28 August 2021, in a Charlotte Edwards Cup match against Central Sparks. She appeared three times for the side in the Rachael Heyhoe Flint Trophy later that season, scoring 46 runs including 39* made against Western Storm. She played six matches for Lightning in 2022, across the Charlotte Edwards Cup and the Rachael Heyhoe Flint Trophy, scoring 118 runs with a top score of 41. She was also once again part of the Trent Rockets squad for The Hundred, but did not play a match. She played four matches for The Blaze (the new name for Lightning) in 2023, scoring 58 runs at an average of 19.33.

In March 2024, Claridge was drafted by Northern Superchargers for The Hundred in 2024. Claridge made 12 appearances for The Blaze as they won the 2024 Charlotte Edwards Cup. She played in both the semi-final versus Central Sparks and the final against South East Stars on Finals Day. Claridge signed a new two-year contract with The Blaze in August 2024.

== International career ==
On 1 October 2024, Claridge was named in the USA squad for their tour of Zimbabwe later that month.
