= 2024 Women's Twenty20 Cup =

English cricket season

- Dates: 26 May 2024 – 26 August 2024
- Administrator(s): England and Wales Cricket Board
- Cricket format: Twenty20
- Tournament format(s): Group stage and knockout
- Champions: Derbyshire (1st title)
- Participants: 35
- Matches: 142
- Most runs: Lara Shaw (306)
- Most wickets: Emma Thatcher (18)

The 2024 Women's Twenty20 Cup, known for sponsorship reasons as the 2024 Vitality Women's County T20, was the 15th edition of the Women's Twenty20 Cup, an English women's cricket Twenty20 domestic competition. It took place between May and August 2024, with 35 teams taking part, organised into four regional groups. It ran alongside the ECB Women's County One-Day.

Derbyshire, Hampshire, Hertfordshire and Warwickshire won their regional groups, with Derbyshire winning the competition at the National Finals.

== Format ==
Teams played matches within a series of regional groups, playing four matchdays, with most matchdays consisting of two matches per team. Matches were played using a Twenty20 format. The top team in each group progressed to the national finals, playing each other team once with the winner of the group crowned national champions.

The groups worked on a points system with positions being based on total points. Points were awarded as follows:

Win: 8 points.
Tie: 4 points.
Abandoned/Cancelled: 2 points.
Loss: 0 points.

Bonus points were awarded as follows:

- Wickets Taken in Powerplay:

1-2: 1 point.
3+: 2 points.

- Runs Scored in Powerplay:

30-44: 1 point.
45+: 2 points.

- Wickets Taken (Overall):

1-4: 1 point.
5-6: 2 points.
7-8: 3 points.
9-10: 4 points.

- Boundaries Scored:

5-10: 1 point.
11-15: 2 points.
16-20: 3 points.
21+: 4 points.

== Teams ==
Teams were divided into four regional groups. Group 1 consisted of 8 teams, whilst Groups 2 to 4 consisted of 9 teams apiece.

Group 1	Cumbria	Derbyshire	Lancashire	North East Warriors	Nottinghamshire	Scotland	Staffordshire	Yorkshire	
Group 2	Cambridgeshire	Huntingdonshire	Leicestershire and Rutland	Lincolnshire	Norfolk	Northamptonshire	Shropshire	Warwickshire	Worcestershire
Group 3	Berkshire	Buckinghamshire	Essex	Hertfordshire	Kent	Middlesex	Suffolk	Surrey	Sussex
Group 4	Cornwall	Devon	Dorset	Gloucestershire	Hampshire	Oxfordshire	Somerset	Wales	Wiltshire

== Standings ==
=== Group 1 ===
Pos	Team	Pld	W	L	T	NR	BP	Pts	NRR
1	Derbyshire (Q)	7	6	1	0	0	57	105	2.400
2	Lancashire	7	6	1	0	0	40	88	1.190
3	Yorkshire	7	3	2	0	2	41	69	0.440
4	Staffordshire	7	2	5	0	0	45	61	−0.800
5	Nottinghamshire	7	3	3	0	1	28	54	−0.910
6	North East Warriors	7	2	2	0	3	15	37	0.380
7	Cumbria	7	1	4	0	2	24	36	−3.680
8	Scotland	7	1	6	0	0	9	17	0.170

Source: Play-Cricket

=== Group 2 ===
Pos	Team	Pld	W	L	T	NR	BP	Pts	NRR
1	Warwickshire (Q)	8	6	0	0	2	47	99	3.520
2	Worcestershire	8	5	1	0	2	49	93	3.870
3	Shropshire	8	4	0	0	4	41	81	2.470
4	Leicestershire and Rutland	8	3	2	1	2	40	72	−0.490
5	Norfolk	8	3	3	0	2	35	63	−2.140
6	Northamptonshire	8	2	2	0	4	26	50	−0.580
7	Cambridgeshire	8	2	6	0	0	30	46	−1.810
8	Lincolnshire	8	1	5	0	2	23	35	−3.300
9	Huntingdonshire	8	0	7	1	0	6	10	−2.280

Source: Play-Cricket

=== Group 3 ===
Pos	Team	Pld	W	L	T	NR	BP	Pts	NRR
1	Sussex	8	6	1	0	1	42	92	1.090
2	Hertfordshire (Q)	8	5	1	0	2	47	91	1.680
3	Middlesex	8	4	2	0	2	37	73	0.130
4	Essex	8	3	4	0	1	37	63	0.270
5	Berkshire	8	3	4	0	1	35	61	−0.320
6	Surrey	8	5	1	0	2	15	59	1.240
7	Kent	8	2	4	0	2	34	54	−0.320
8	Suffolk	8	1	6	0	1	30	40	−0.790
9	Buckinghamshire	8	0	6	0	2	12	16	−3.050

Source: Play-Cricket

=== Group 4 ===
Pos	Team	Pld	W	L	T	NR	BP	Pts	NRR
1	Hampshire (Q)	8	5	3	0	0	62	102	0.440
2	Somerset	8	6	2	0	0	48	96	0.840
3	Oxfordshire	8	4	4	0	0	52	84	0.470
4	Gloucestershire	8	4	2	0	2	41	77	2.480
5	Devon	8	4	2	0	2	36	72	0.670
6	Wales	8	4	2	0	2	36	72	0.640
7	Wiltshire	8	2	4	0	2	30	50	−0.650
8	Dorset	8	1	5	0	2	29	41	−3.500
9	Cornwall	8	0	6	0	2	23	27	−2.360

Source: Play-Cricket
- advanced to the national finals

== Fixtures ==
=== Group 1 ===
26 May 2024
10:30 BST
Scorecard

Nottinghamshire; 71/5 (9 overs)	v	Staffordshire; 69/4 (9 overs)
Rhiannon Knowling-Davies 29 (18); Ilenia Sims 1/13 (2 overs)		Meg Austin 27* (22); Ruby Neal 2/14 (2 overs)

Nottinghamshire won by 2 runs
Blidworth Colliery Welfare Cricket Club, Blidworth

- Staffordshire won the toss and elected to bowl.
- Match reduced to 9 overs per side due to rain.
- Points: Nottinghamshire 11, Staffordshire 5

26 May 2024
10:30 BST
Scorecard

Yorkshire	v	North East Warriors

Match Abandoned
Weetwood Playing Fields, Leeds

- No toss.
- No play possible due to rain.
- Points: Yorkshire 2, North East Warriors 2

26 May 2024
11:00 BST
Scorecard

Scotland; 77/6 (20 overs)	v	Lancashire; 80/5 (15.1 overs)
Samantha Haggo 20 (29); Eliza Cottam 2/3 (2 overs)		Grace Johnson 36* (34); Jenna Stanton 3/19 (3.1 overs)

Lancashire won by 5 wickets
Widnes Cricket Club, Widnes
Umpires: Mike Jones and B Boys

- Lancashire won the toss and elected to field.
- Points: Lancashire 13, Scotland 4

26 May 2024
13:30 BST
Scorecard

Cumbria	v	North East Warriors

Match Abandoned
Weetwood Playing Fields, Leeds

- No toss.
- No play possible due to rain.
- Points: North East Warriors 2, Cumbria 2

26 May 2024
13:30 BST
Scorecard

Derbyshire; 97/5 (16 overs)	v	Staffordshire; 93 (15.5 overs)
Natasha Allen 24 (33); Sophie Richards 2/14 (2 overs)		Meg Austin 35 (23); Pagan Hardwick 2/15 (3 overs)

Derbyshire won by 7 runs (DLS)
Blidworth Colliery Welfare Cricket Club, Blidworth
Umpires: Nick Wilson and Gabby Brown

- Staffordshire won the toss and elected to bowl.
- Match reduced to 16 overs per side due to rain
- Staffordshire target adjusted to 101 runs from 16 overs.
- Points: Derbyshire 15, Staffordshire 4

26 May 2024
16:30 BST
Scorecard

Derbyshire; 159/3 (20 overs)	v	Nottinghamshire; 120 (18.5 overs)
Natasha Allen 63 (56); Evee-Mae Hicklin 1/21 (4 overs)		Rhiannon Knowling-Davies 42 (35); Zara Craig 3/19 (4 overs)

Derbyshire won by 39 runs
Blidworth Colliery Welfare Cricket Club, Blidworth
Umpires: Matt Boyer and Gabi Brown

- Nottinghamshire won the toss and elected to bowl.
- Points: Derbyshire 18, Nottinghamshire 4

26 May 2024
16:30 BST
Scorecard

Yorkshire	v	Cumbria

Match Abandoned
Weetwood Playing Fields, Leeds

- No toss.
- No play possible due to rain.
- Points: Yorkshire 2, Cumbria 2

16 June 2024
10:30 BST
Scorecard

Lancashire; 93/9 (20 overs)	v	Derbyshire; 85/7 (20 overs)
Alice Clarke 40 (38); Emma Thatcher 4/11 (4 overs)		Harriett Parkin 17* (17); Laura Jackson 3/5 (4 overs)

Lancashire won by 8 runs
Queen's Park, Chesterfield

- Derbyshire won the toss and elected to bowl.
- Points: Lancashire 12, Derbyshire 7

16 June 2024
10:30 BST
Scorecard

Scotland; 96 (19.4 overs)	v	North East Warriors; 99/2 (13.3 overs)
Abbi Aitken-Drummond 28 (24); Ellie Tiffin 3/9 (4 overs)		Layla Tipton 55* (36); Abtaha Maqsood 1/16 (4 overs)

North East Warriors won by 8 wickets
Boldon Cricket Club, The Boldons
Umpires: Gillian Woodley and David Bridge

- North East Warriors won the toss and elected to bowl.
- Points: North East Warriors 8, Scotland 0

16 June 2024
11:00 BST
Scorecard

Staffordshire; 137/9 (20 overs)	v	Cumbria; 62 (15.3 overs)
Lexie Cantrill 35 (20); Eve Bousfield 2/13 (3 overs)		Tilly Kesteven 29 (28); Ilenia Sims 3/13 (4 overs)

Staffordshire won by 75 runs
Kendal Cricket Club, Kendal

- Staffordshire won the toss and elected to bat.
- Points: Staffordshire 17, Cumbria 7

16 June 2024
13:30 BST
Scorecard

Scotland; 155/8 (20 overs)	v	Nottinghamshire; 156/8 (19.4 overs)
Abbi Aitken-Drummond 62 (26); Liv Wade 2/18 (4 overs)		Emily Hughes 51* (35); Abtaha Maqsood 3/35 (4 overs)

Nottinghamshire won by 2 wickets
Boldon Cricket Club, The Boldons

- Nottinghamshire won the toss and elected to field.
- Points: Nottinghamshire 15, Scotland 0

16 June 2024
13:30 BST
Scorecard

Lancashire; 123/7 (20 overs)	v	Yorkshire; 105/4 (20 overs)
Daisy Mullan 19 (20); Abigail Glen 2/13 (4 overs)		Amelia Oliver 43 (59); Olivia Bell 2/15 (4 overs)

Lancashire won by 18 runs
Queen's Park, Chesterfield

- Lancashire won the toss and elected to bat.
- Points: Lancashire 12, Yorkshire 5

16 June 2024
16:30 BST
Scorecard

Yorkshire; 93/6 (20 overs)	v	Derbyshire; 94/4 (14.5 overs)
Hannah Buck 34 (48); Emma Thatcher 3/25 (4 overs)		Lara Shaw 37 (29); Emma Wrightson 1/18 (3 overs)

Derbyshire won by 6 wickets
Queen's Park, Chesterfield

- Derbyshire won the toss and elected to bowl.
- Points: Derbyshire 14, Yorkshire 3

16 June 2024
16:30 BST
Scorecard

Nottinghamshire; 53/6 (10 overs)	v	North East Warriors
Ella Porter 23 (27); Grace Thompson 1/6 (2 overs)

No Result
Boldon Cricket Club, The Boldons

- North East Warriors won the toss and elected to bowl.
- No further play possible due to rain.
- Points: North East Warriors 2, Nottinghamshire 2

28 July 2024
10:30 BST
Scorecard

Derbyshire; 181/3 (20 overs)	v	Cumbria; 32 (8.4 overs)
Lara Shaw 106* (75); Gemma Rose 2/33 (4 overs)		Tilly Kesteven 11 (12); Pagan Hardwick 4/12 (4 overs)

Derbyshire won by 149 runs
Darley Dale Cricket Club, Darley Dale

- Derbyshire won the toss and elected to bat.
- Points: Derbyshire 18, Cumbria 3

28 July 2024
10:30 BST
Scorecard

North West Warriors; 123/4 (20 overs)	v	Staffordshire; 69 (16 overs)
Layla Tipton 57* (45); Lucy Shenton 2/13 (4 overs)		Lucy Shenton 16 (26); Jenny McDowell 2/1 (1 over)

North East Warriors won by 54 runs
Highfield, Leek
Umpires: Martin Gentle and Nicola Owen

- North East Warriors won the toss and elected to bat.
- Points: North East Warriors 16, Staffordshire 5

28 July 2024
11:00 BST
Scorecard

Yorkshire; 156/8 (20 overs)	v	Nottinghamshire; 90 (18.1 overs)
Amelia Oliver 57 (50); Rhiannon Knowling-Davies 3/41 (4 overs)		Diya Badge 22 (26); Jeanie Lee 2/13 (4 overs)

Yorkshire won by 66 runs
Flintham Cricket Club, Flintham

- Nottinghamshire won the toss and elected to bowl.
- Points: Yorkshire 19, Nottinghamshire 0

28 July 2024
13:30 BST
Scorecard

Scotland; 168/6 (20 overs)	v	Cumbria; 52 (18 overs)
Samantha Haggo 60* (50); Maddie Wood 3/33 (4 overs)		Charlotte Whitaker 11 (16); Katherine Fraser 3/3 (4 overs)

Scotland won by 116 runs
Darley Dale Cricket Club, Darley Dale

- Scotland won the toss and elected to bat.
- Points: Scotland 8, Cumbria 0

28 July 2024
10:30 BST
Scorecard

Lancashire; 129/4 (20 overs)	v	North West Warriors; 127/7 (20 overs)
Daisy Mullan 57* (44); Freya Rook 3/15 (4 overs)		Trudy Johnson 57* (55); Venus Weerappuli 2/28 (4 overs)

Lancashire won by 2 runs
Highfield, Leek

- North East Warriors won the toss and elected to bowl.
- Points: Lancashire 15, North East Warriors 4

28 July 2024
16:30 BST
Scorecard

Derbyshire; 150/4 (20 overs)	v	Scotland; 129/7 (20 overs)
Bethany Harmer 57* (50); Chloe Abel 2/28 (4 overs)		Ellen Watson 35 (36); Maria Andrews 2/16 (4 overs)

Derbyshire won by 21 runs
Darley Dale Cricket Club, Darley Dale

- Derbyshire won the toss and elected to bat.
- Points: Derbyshire 17, Scotland 5

28 July 2024
16:30 BST
Scorecard

Lancashire; 139/7 (20 overs)	v	Staffordshire; 62 (16 overs)
Alice Clarke 50 (35); Georgina Turner 2/21 (4 overs)		Amy Wheeler 14 (19); Sophie Morris 3/13 (4 overs)

Lancashire won by 77 runs
Highfield, Leek

- Staffordshire won the toss and elected to bowl.
- Points: Lancashire 16, Staffordshire 5

11 August 2024
10:30 BST
Scorecard

Nottinghamshire; 140/7 (20 overs)	v	Lancashire; 119 (20 overs)
Teresa Graves 36 (38); Martha Rimmer 2/21 (4 overs)		Maeve Jones 23* (19); Sadie Hodgson 3/27 (4 overs)

Nottinghamshire won by 21 runs
Fleetwood Hesketh Cricket Club, Southport

- Nottinghamshire won the toss and elected to bat.
- Points: Nottinghamshire 14, Lancashire 7

11 August 2024
10:30 BST
Scorecard

Yorkshire	v	Scotland

Yorkshire won via walkover
Castleford Cricket Club, Castleford

- Points: Yorkshire 20, Scotland 0

11 August 2024
11:00 BST
Scorecard

North East Warriors; 67 (18.3 overs)	v	Derbyshire; 68/1 (8.3 overs)
Trudy Johnson 21 (20); Harriett Parkin 3/9 (3 overs)		Lara Shaw 39* (27); Freya Rook 1/22 (3 overs)

Derbyshire won by 9 wickets
Rockcliffe Park Cricket Club, Darlington

- North East Warriors won the toss and elected to bat.
- Points: Derbyshire 16, North East Warriors 3

11 August 2024
13:30 BST
Scorecard

Cumbria; 179/4 (20 overs)	v	Nottinghamshire; 159/6 (20 overs)
Laura Marshall 77 (50); Rhiannon Knowling-Davies 3/34 (4 overs)		Michaela Kirk 62 (47); Maddie Wood 2/27 (4 overs)

Cumbria won by 20 runs
Fleetwood Hesketh Cricket Club, Southport

- Cumbria won the toss and elected to bat.
- Points: Cumbria 16, Nottinghamshire 6

11 August 2024
13:30 BST
Scorecard

Staffordshire	v	Scotland

Staffordshire won via walkover
Castleford Cricket Club, Castleford

- Points: Staffordshire 20, Scotland 0

11 August 2024
16:30 BST
Scorecard

Lancashire; 192/5 (20 overs)	v	Cumbria; 144/2 (20 overs)
Alice Clarke 75* (64); Laura Marshall 1/2 (0.4 overs)		Tilly Kesteven 64 (54); Sophie Morris 1/17 (4 overs)

Lancashire won by 48 runs
Fleetwood Hesketh Cricket Club, Southport

- Lancashire won the toss and elected to bat.
- Points: Lancashire 13, Cumbria 6

11 August 2024
16:30 BST
Scorecard

Staffordshire; 142/9 (20 overs)	v	Yorkshire; 145/2 (17.3 overs)
Sophie Beech 29 (28); Holly Garton 3/22 (4 overs)		Emma Marlow 51 (48); Christina Gough 1/14 (2 overs)

Yorkshire won by 8 wickets
Castleford Cricket Club, Castleford

- Staffordshire won the toss and elected to bat.
- Points: Yorkshire 18, Staffordshire 5

=== Group 2 ===
26 May 2024
10:30 BST
Scorecard

Cambridgeshire	v	Huntingdonshire

Cambridgeshire won via walkover
Fenner's, Cambridge

- No toss.
- Points: Cambridgeshire 20, Huntingdonshire 0

26 May 2024
10:30 BST
Scorecard

Lincolnshire; 33/1 (4 overs)	v	Northamptonshire
Alicia Shaw 21* (14); Patricia Hankins 1/20 (2 overs)

No Result
Cleethorpes Cricket Club, Cleethorpes

- Northamptonshire won the toss and elected to bowl.
- Points: Lincolnshire 3, Northamptonshire 3

26 May 2024
10:30 BST
Scorecard

Worcestershire	v	Warwickshire

Match Abandoned
Halesowen Cricket Club, Halesowen

- No toss.
- No play possible due to rain.
- Points: Worcestershire 2, Warwickshire 2

26 May 2024
13:30 BST
Scorecard

Shropshire	v	Warwickshire

Match Abandoned
Halesowen Cricket Club, Halesowen

- No toss.
- No play possible due to rain.
- Points: Shropshire 2, Warwickshire 2

26 May 2024
13:30 BST
Scorecard

Leicestershire and Rutland	v	Northamptonshire

Match Abandoned
Cleethorpes Cricket Club, Cleethorpes

- No toss.
- No play possible due to rain.
- Points: Leicestershire and Rutland 2, Northamptonshire 2

26 May 2024
13:30 BST
Scorecard

Norfolk	v	Huntingdonshire

Norfolk won via walkover
Fenner's, Cambridge

- No toss.
- Points: Norfolk 20, Huntingdonshire 0

26 May 2024
16:30 BST
Scorecard

Norfolk; 89/3 (16 overs)	v	Cambridgeshire; 84/6 (16 overs)
Evie Booker 31 (41); Connie Piper 1/7 (3 overs)		Anabel Kaser 39* (45); Phoebe Bramford 2/5 (2 overs)

Norfolk won by 5 runs
Fenner's, Cambridge

- Cambridgeshire won the toss and elected to bowl.
- Match reduced to 16 overs per side due to rain.
- Points: Norfolk 12, Cambridgeshire 3

26 May 2024
16:30 BST
Scorecard

Lincolnshire	v	Leicestershire and Rutland

Match Abandoned
Cleethorpes Cricket Club, Cleethorpes

- No toss.
- No play possible due to rain.
- Points: Lincolnshire 2, Leicestershire and Rutland 2

26 May 2024
16:30 BST
Scorecard

Worcestershire	v	Shropshire

Match Abandoned
Halesowen Cricket Club, Halesowen

- No toss.
- No play possible due to rain.
- Points: Worcestershire 2, Shropshire 2

16 June 2024
10:30 BST
Scorecard

Worcestershire; 163/3 (20 overs)	v	Huntingdonshire; 72 (17.3 overs)
Hannah Hardwick 57 (41); Emily Banks 1/22 (2 overs)		Faith Teekasingh 17 (25); Flora Bertwistle 2/14 (4 overs); Phoebe Brett 2/14 (4 overs)

Worcestershire won by 91 runs
Ramsey Cricket Club, Ramsey

- Worcestershire won the toss and elected to bat.
- Points: Worcestershire 17, Huntingdonshire 0

16 June 2024
10:30 BST
Scorecard

Norfolk	v	Shropshire

Match Abandoned
Fakenham Cricket Club, Fakenham

- No toss.
- No play possible due to rain.
- Points: Norfolk 2, Shropshire 2

16 June 2024
10:30 BST
Scorecard

Lincolnshire; 36/4 (10 overs)	v	Warwickshire; 38/0 (5.3 overs)
Abigail Hannan 19* (26); Anisha Patel 2/4 (2 overs)		Mariam Khan 21* (22)

Warwickshire won by 10 wickets
Edgbaston Foundation Ground, Birmingham

- Warwickshire won the toss and elected to bowl.
- Match reduced to 10 overs per side due to rain.
- Points: Warwickshire 10, Lincolnshire 0

16 June 2024
13:30 BST
Scorecard

Lincolnshire; 119/7 (20 overs)	v	Cambridgeshire; 120/6 (18.2 overs)
Abigail Hannan 65* (58); Beth Matthews 3/22 (4 overs)		Nina Jerman 29 (31); Caitlin Phillips 2/15 (3 overs)

Cambridgeshire won by 4 wickets
Edgbaston Foundation Ground, Birmingham

- Cambridgeshire won the toss and elected to bowl.
- Points: Cambridgeshire 14, Lincolnshire 4

16 June 2024
13:30 BST
Scorecard

Leicestershire and Rutland; 118/6 (20 overs)	v	Worcestershire; 101/6 (20 overs)
Prisha Thanawala 39 (39); Phoebe Brett 4/17 (4 overs)		Georgina Macey 38 (51); Una Paramjothy 3/10 (4 overs)

Leicestershire and Rutland won by 17 runs
Ramsey Cricket Club, Ramsey

- Worcestershire won the toss and elected to bowl.
- Points: Leicestershire and Rutland 15, Worcestershire 4

16 June 2024
13:30 BST
Scorecard

Northamptonshire	v	Shropshire

Match Abandoned
Fakenham Cricket Club, Fakenham

- No toss.
- No play possible due to rain.
- Points: Northamptonshire 2, Shropshire 2

16 June 2024
16:30 BST
Scorecard

Leicestershire and Rutland; 64 (15.1 overs)	v	Huntingdonshire; 64/8 (20 overs)
Rebecca Brooker 11 (12); Lottie-May Taylor 3/14 (4 overs)		Faith Teekasingh 24 (42); Aimee Colquohoun 3/5 (4 overs)

Match Tied
Ramsey Cricket Club, Ramsey

- Huntingdonshire won the toss and elected to bowl.
- Points: Huntingdonshire 10, Leicestershire and Rutland 8

16 June 2024
16:30 BST
Scorecard

Norfolk	v	Northamptonshire

Match Abandoned
Fakenham Cricket Club, Fakenham

- No toss.
- No play possible due to rain.
- Points: Norfolk 2, Northamptonshire 2

16 June 2024
16:30 BST
Scorecard

Warwickshire; 131/4 (20 overs)	v	Cambridgeshire; 93/8 (20 overs)
Laura Smitten 55* (60); Connie Piper 2/33 (4 overs)		Kelly Haynes 31 (25); Ellie Phillips 2/6 (2 overs)

Warwickshire won by 38 runs
Edgbaston Foundation Ground, Birmingham

- Warwickshire won the toss and elected to bat.
- Points: Warwickshire 15, Cambridgeshire 4

28 July 2024
10:30 BST
Scorecard

Shropshire	v	Huntingdonshire

Shropshire won via walkover
Allscott Heath Cricket Club, Telford

- Points: Shropshire 20, Huntingdonshire 0

28 July 2024
10:30 BST
Scorecard

Norfolk; 83/9 (20 overs)	v	Leicestershire and Rutland; 87/3 (15 overs)
Evie Booker 25 (28); Hannah Francis 2/16 (3 overs)		Rebecca Brooker 32* (31); Amy Morris 1/15 (2 overs)

Leicestershire and Rutland won by 7 wickets
Uppingham School, Uppingham

- Norfolk won the toss and elected to bat.
- Points: Leicestershire and Rutland 15, Norfolk 3

28 July 2024
10:30 BST
Scorecard

Cambridgeshire; 40 (13.5 overs)	v	Northamptonshire; 41/3 (8.1 overs)
Lulu Harding 10 (8); Bethan Solomon 3/9 (3.5 overs)		Hayley Brown 14* (17); Isabella James 2/3 (3 overs)

Northamptonshire won by 7 wickets
Geddington Sports Ground, Geddington
Umpires: C McCabe and S Horner

- Northamptonshire won the toss and elected to bowl.
- Points: Northamptonshire 15, Cambridgeshire 3

28 July 2024
13:30 BST
Scorecard

Lincolnshire	v	Huntingdonshire

Lincolnshire won via walkover
Allscott Heath Cricket Club, Telford

- Points: Lincolnshire 20, Huntingdonshire 0

28 July 2024
13:30 BST
Scorecard

Warwickshire; 216/4 (20 overs)	v	Norfolk; 94/8 (20 overs)
Ria Fackrell 75* (33); Abi Free 2/40 (4 overs)		Emily Dack 36 (38); Anisha Patel 4/16 (4 overs)

Warwickshire won by 122 runs
Uppingham School, Uppingham

- Norfolk won the toss and elected to bowl.
- Points: Warwickshire 17, Norfolk 4

28 July 2024
13:30 BST
Scorecard

Cambridgeshire; 65 (17.1 overs)	v	Worcestershire; 69/2 (8 overs)
Nina Jerman 23 (28); Flora Bertwistle 4/13 (4 overs)		Chloe Hill 45* (23); Beatrice Routledge 1/9 (1 over)

Worcestershire won by 8 wickets
Geddington Sports Ground, Geddington

- Worcestershire won the toss and elected to bowl.
- Points: Worcestershire 17, Cambridgeshire 0

28 July 2024
16:30 BST
Scorecard

Shropshire; 170/3 (20 overs)	v	Lincolnshire; 81 (18.3 overs)
Amy Griffiths 77* (67); Rhiannon Hillman 1/14 (3 overs)		Lauren Tuffrey 13 (19); Madison Windeatt 3/11 (4 overs)

Shropshire won by 89 runs
Allscott Heath Cricket Club, Telford
Umpires: Nathan Bartram and Duncan Brearley

- Shropshire won the toss and elected to bat.
- Points: Shropshire 19, Lincolnshire 2

28 July 2024
16:30 BST
Scorecard

Warwickshire; 147/6 (20 overs)	v	Leicestershire and Rutland; 64 (11.4 overs)
Laura Smitten 30* (32); Sophie Lawrence 3/24 (4 overs)		Rebecca Brooker 21 (20); Ria Fackrell 5/11 (3 overs)

Warwickshire won by 83 runs
Uppingham School, Uppingham

- Warwickshire won the toss and elected to bat.
- Points: Warwickshire 17, Leicestershire and Rutland 5

28 July 2024
16:30 BST
Scorecard

Northamptonshire; 61 (19.3 overs)	v	Worcestershire; 63/1 (10 overs)
Beth Talbot 17* (20); Phoebe Brett 3/6 (4 overs)		Clare Boycott 33* (34); Bethan Solomon 1/15 (3 overs)

Worcestershire won by 9 wickets
Geddington Sports Ground, Geddington

- Worcestershire won the toss and elected to bowl.
- Points: Worcestershire 15, Northamptonshire 2

11 August 2024
10:30 BST
Scorecard

Shropshire; 112/5 (20 overs)	v	Leicestershire and Rutland; 102 (19.2 overs)
Caitlin Belcher 30 (33); Faith Teekasingh 1/7 (1 over)		Sophie Bennett 57* (60); Indira Singh 4/22 (3.2 overs)

Shropshire won by 10 runs
Shifnal Cricket Club, Shifnal

- Shropshire won the toss and elected to bat.
- Points: Shropshire 14, Leicestershire and Rutland 5

11 August 2024
10:30 BST
Scorecard

Worcestershire; 212/1 (20 overs)	v	Lincolnshire; 58 (18.5 overs)
Chloe Hill 93* (56); Lauren Tuffrey 1/20 (3 overs)		Lauren Tuffrey 25 (37); Amy Maund 4/9 (4 overs)

Worcestershire won by 154 runs
Bourne Cricket Club, Bourne

- Worcestershire won the toss and elected to bat.
- Points: Worcestershire 20, Lincolnshire 0

11 August 2024
10:30 BST
Scorecard

Northamptonshire	v	Huntingdonshire

Northamptonshire won via walkover
Geddington Sports Ground, Geddington

- Points: Northamptonshire 20, Huntingdonshire 0

11 August 2024
13:30 BST
Scorecard

Cambridgeshire	v	Leicestershire and Rutland

Leicestershire and Rutland won via walkover
Shifnal Cricket Club, Shifnal

- Points: Leicestershire and Rutland 20, Cambridgeshire 0

11 August 2024
13:30 BST
Scorecard

Worcestershire; 151/5 (20 overs)	v	Norfolk; 91/7 (20 overs)
Clare Boycott 90* (66); Jade Hoyte 2/15 (3 overs)		Georgia Demetriou 23 (33); Flora Bertwistle 2/10 (4 overs)

Worcestershire won by 60 runs
Bourne Cricket Club, Bourne

- Worcestershire won the toss and elected to bat.
- Points: Worcestershire 16, Norfolk 4

11 August 2024
13:30 BST
Scorecard

Warwickshire	v	Huntingdonshire

Warwickshire won via walkover
Geddington Sports Ground, Geddington

- Points: Warwickshire 20, Huntingdonshire 0

11 August 2024
16:30 BST
Scorecard

Shropshire	v	Cambridgeshire

Shropshire won via walkover
Shifnal Cricket Club, Shifnal

- Points: Shropshire 20, Cambridgeshire 0

11 August 2024
16:30 BST
Scorecard

Lincolnshire; 121/4 (20 overs)	v	Norfolk; 122/5 (19.5 overs)
Alicia Shaw 69 (60); Maddy Browne 4/11 (3 overs)		Alice Brand 46* (40); Holly Vaughan 2/18 (4 overs)

Norfolk won by 5 wickets
Bourne Cricket Club, Bourne

- Lincolnshire won the toss and elected to bat.
- Points: Norfolk 16, Lincolnshire 4

11 August 2024
16:30 BST
Scorecard

Warwickshire; 144/4 (20 overs)	v	Northamptonshire; 108/5 (20 overs)
Ria Fackrell 86* (64); Farida Bibi 2/23 (4 overs)		Hayley Brown 47* (56); Gemma Porter 2/18 (4 overs)

Warwickshire won by 36 runs
Geddington Sports Ground, Geddington

- Northamptonshire won the toss and elected to bowl.
- Points: Warwickshire 16, Northamptonshire 4

=== Group 3 ===
26 May 2024
10:30 BST
Scorecard

Berkshire; 60/9 (20 overs)	v	Sussex; 61/5 (14.5 overs)
Mia Rogers 15 (25); Regina Suddahazai 2/6 (3 overs)		Isabelle Collis 21 (27); Poppy Tulloch 3/10 (4 overs)

Sussex won by 5 wickets
Falkland Cricket Club, Newbury

- Sussex won the toss and elected to bowl.
- Points: Sussex 13, Berkshire 3

26 May 2024
10:30 BST
Scorecard

Essex	v	Kent

Match Abandoned
Colchester & East Essex Cricket Club, Colchester

- No toss.
- No play possible due to rain.
- Points: Essex 2, Kent 2

26 May 2024
10:30 BST
Scorecard

Middlesex	v	Surrey

Match Abandoned
Mill Hill School, Mill Hill

- No toss.
- No play possible due to rain.
- Points: Middlesex 2, Surrey 2

26 May 2024
13:30 BST
Scorecard

Buckinghamshire; 28/3 (7 overs)	v	Sussex
Amelia Peck 13* (14); Beth Harvey 1/4 (1 overs)

No Result
Falkland Cricket Club, Newbury
Umpires: David Halle and Neville Wallace

- Buckinghamshire won the toss and elected to bat.
- No further play possible due to rain.
- Points: Sussex 5, Buckinghamshire 2

26 May 2024
13:30 BST
Scorecard

Hertfordshire	v	Surrey

Match Abandoned
Mill Hill School, Mill Hill

- No toss.
- No play possible due to rain.
- Points: Hertfordshire 2, Surrey 2

26 May 2024
13:30 BST
Scorecard

Suffolk	v	Kent

Match Abandoned
Colchester & East Essex Cricket Club, Colchester

- No toss.
- No play possible due to rain.
- Points: Suffolk 2, Kent 2

26 May 2024
16:30 BST
Scorecard

Berkshire	v	Buckinghamshire

Match Abandoned
Falkland Cricket Club, Newbury

- No toss.
- No play possible due to rain.
- Points: Berkshire 2, Buckinghamshire 2

26 May 2024
16:30 BST
Scorecard

Essex; 163/5 (20 overs)	v	Suffolk; 88/4 (19.4 overs)
Matilda Callaghan 55 (48); Amelie Clarke 1/24 (2 overs)		Amelie Clarke 38* (48); Esmae MacGregor 1/10 (2.4 overs)

Essex won by 71 runs (DLS)
Colchester & East Essex Cricket Club, Colchester

- Suffolk won the toss and elected to field.
- Suffolk innings curtailed at 19.4 overs due to rain; target was 160.
- Points: Essex 16, Suffolk 4

26 May 2024
16:30 BST
Scorecard

Middlesex	v	Hertfordshire

Match Abandoned
Mill Hill School, Mill Hill

- No toss.
- No play possible due to rain.
- Points: Middlesex 2, Hertfordshire 2

16 June 2024
10:30 BST
Scorecard

Buckinghamshire; 105/7 (20 overs)	v	Hertfordshire; 107/1 (10.1 overs)
Amelia Ridgway 33 (45); Gemma Marriott 3/20 (4 overs)		Gemma Marriott 58* (30); Georgie Lloyd 1/18 (2 overs)

Hertfordshire won by 9 wickets
High Wycombe Cricket Club, High Wycombe

- Hertfordshire won the toss and elected to field.
- Points: Hertfordshire 17, Buckinghamshire 2

16 June 2024
10:30 BST
Scorecard

Essex; 122/5 (20 overs)	v	Middlesex; 124/1 (19 overs)
Katherine Speed 29 (36); Bhavika Gajipra 3/23 (4 overs)		Saskia Horley 64* (52); Prisha Bedi 1/27 (3 overs)

Middlesex won by 9 wickets
Haberdashers' Boys' School, Elstree

- Essex won the toss and elected to bat.
- Points: Middlesex 15, Essex 3

16 June 2024
10:30 BST
Scorecard

Kent; 101/7 (20 overs)	v	Sussex; 102/2 (15.4 overs)
Darcey Carter 45 (39); Mary Taylor 3/6 (3 overs)		Mary Taylor 50* (50); Darcey Carter 1/18 (3.4 overs)

Sussex won by 8 wickets
County Ground, Hove
Umpires: Dick Smith and Julia Jarvis

- Sussex won the toss and elected to bowl.
- Points: Sussex 15, Kent 3

16 June 2024
13:30 BST
Scorecard

Berkshire; 106/6 (20 overs)	v	Essex; 109/8 (19.2 overs)
Mia Rogers 44 (41); Grace Poole 1/12 (3 overs)		Bella Johnson 37* (26); Shayna Chikhlia 2/12 (2 overs)

Essex won by 2 wickets
Haberdashers' Boys' School, Elstree

- Berkshire won the toss and elected to bat.
- Points: Essex 12, Berkshire 6

16 June 2024
13:30 BST
Scorecard

Hertfordshire; 168/6 (20 overs)	v	Suffolk; 111/6 (20 overs)
Amelia Kemp 72 (48); Isobel Sidhu 3/17 (4 overs)		Natalie Samuels 20 (23); Charley Phillips 2/14 (4 overs)

Hertfordshire won by 57 runs
High Wycombe Cricket Club, High Wycombe

- Suffolk won the toss and elected to bowl.
- Points: Hertfordshire 16, Suffolk 5

16 June 2024
13:30 BST
Scorecard

Kent; 123/7 (20 overs)	v	Surrey; 125/4 (18.5 overs)
Genevieve Jeer 50* (48); Amy Gordon 3/14 (4 overs)		Amy Gordon 47 (36); Darcey Carter 1/10 (3 overs)

Surrey won by 6 wickets
County Ground, Hove
Umpires: Geoff Le Fevre and Dick Smith

- Kent won the toss and elected to bat.
- Points: Surrey 14, Kent 6

16 June 2024
16:30 BST
Scorecard

Suffolk; 188/1 (20 overs)	v	Buckinghamshire; 70 (16.5 overs)
Emily Cunningham 87* (55); Alissa Shannon 1/33 (4 overs)		Rosie Burton-Pye 21 (21); Imogen Sidhu 4/14 (4 overs)

Suffolk won by 118 runs
High Wycombe Cricket Club, High Wycombe

- Suffolk won the toss and elected to bat.
- Points: Suffolk 8, Buckinghamshire 1

16 June 2024
16:30 BST
Scorecard

Middlesex; 98/9 (20 overs)	v	Berkshire; 87/9 (20 overs)
Sonali Patel 30 (36); Shayna Chikhlia 4/16 (4 overs)		Poppy Tulloch 29 (26); Layla Judge 2/5 (3 overs)

Middlesex won by 11 runs
Haberdashers' Boys' School, Elstree

- Middlesex won the toss and elected to bat.
- Points: Middlesex 14, Berkshire 6

16 June 2024
16:30 BST
Scorecard

Sussex; 120/4 (20 overs)	v	Surrey; 121/5 (19 overs)
Mollie Adams 26* (28); Anna Lewis 2/16 (3 overs)		Priyanaz Chatterji 39* (32); Millie Taylor 2/21 (4 overs)

Surrey won by 5 wickets
County Ground, Hove
Umpires: Julia Jarvis and Geoff Le Fevre

- Surrey won the toss and elected to bowl.
- Points: Surrey 14, Sussex 5

28 July 2024
10:30 BST
Scorecard

Hertfordshire; 66/6 (20 overs)	v	Sussex; 67/7 (15.3 overs)
Elsa Barnfather 20 (22); Beth Harvey 3/9 (4 overs)		Millie Taylor 19* (25); Gemma Marriott 3/6 (2 overs)

Sussex won by 3 wickets
Harpenden Cricket Club, Harpenden

- Hertfordshire won the toss and elected to bat.
- Points: Sussex 12, Hertfordshire 6

28 July 2024
10:30 BST
Scorecard

Kent; 128/3 (20 overs)	v	Buckinghamshire; 103 (18.2 overs)
Megan Sturge 45* (25); Amelia Ridgway 1/14 (4 overs)		Amelia Ridgway 26 (29); Alice Grant 2/16 (3.2 overs)

Kent won by 25 runs
Nevill Ground, Royal Tunbridge Wells
Umpires: Mel Juniper and John McBride

- Kent won the toss and elected to bat.
- Points: Kent 15, Buckinghamshire 4

28 July 2024
10:30 BST
Scorecard

Surrey; 132/5 (20 overs)	v	Suffolk; 67/8 (20 overs)
Amy Gordon 73 (64); Isobel Sidhu 1/13 (4 overs)		Imogen Sidhu 15 (34); Claudie Cooper 4/5 (4 overs)

Surrey won by 65 runs
Chipstead Coulsdon & Walcountians Cricket Club, Chipstead

- Suffolk won the toss and elected to bowl.
- Points: Surrey 8, Suffolk 3

28 July 2024
13:30 BST
Scorecard

Suffolk; 94 (20 overs)	v	Berkshire; 95/9 (19.4 overs)
Sophie Hughes 36 (42); Lily Bowlby 3/12 (4 overs)		Lily Bowlby 32* (33); Amelie Clarke 2/16 (3 overs)

Berkshire won by 1 wicket
Chipstead Coulsdon & Walcountians Cricket Club, Chipstead

- Berkshire won the toss and elected to bowl.
- Points: Berkshire 14, Suffolk 7

28 July 2024
13:30 BST
Scorecard

Sussex; 135/5 (20 overs)	v	Essex; 116/5 (20 overs)
Chiara Green 48* (26); Grace Poole 1/9 (4 overs)		Kelly Castle 28* (27); Beth Harvey 2/9 (2 overs)

Sussex won by 19 runs
Harpenden Cricket Club, Harpenden

- Sussex won the toss and elected to bat.
- Points: Sussex 14, Essex 6

28 July 2024
13:30 BST
Scorecard

Middlesex; 130/4 (20 overs)	v	Buckinghamshire; 105 (20 overs)
Isabella Routledge 55 (58); Natasha MacBean 1/16 (4 overs)		Tilly Fellows 22 (33); Gayatri Gole 2/12 (3 overs)

Middlesex won by 25 runs
Nevill Ground, Royal Tunbridge Wells

- Middlesex won the toss and elected to bat.
- Points: Middlesex 14, Buckinghamshire 5

28 July 2024
16:30 BST
Scorecard

Essex; 90 (16.4 overs)	v	Hertfordshire; 92/3 (13 overs)
Kelly Castle 22 (30); Rebecca Tyson 3/22 (4 overs); Mabel Reid 3/22 (4 overs)		Kezia Hassall 27* (26); Ashmitaa Surenkumar 2/19 (3 overs)

Hertfordshire won by 7 wickets
Harpenden Cricket Club, Harpenden

- Hertfordshire won the toss and elected to bowl.
- Points: Hertfordshire 16, Essex 3

28 July 2024
16:30 BST
Scorecard

Kent; 137/4 (20 overs)	v	Middlesex; 134/9 (20 overs)
Coco Streets 69 (58); Riva Pindoria 1/10 (1 over)		Hannah Taylor-Yeates 29* (22); Daisy Brandon 3/29 (4 overs)

Kent won by 3 runs
Nevill Ground, Royal Tunbridge Wells

- Kent won the toss and elected to bat.
- Points: Kent 8, Middlesex 5

28 July 2024
16:30 BST
Scorecard

Berkshire; 98/6 (20 overs)	v	Surrey; 83 (18 overs)
Francesca Sweet 23 (27); Charlotte Stubbs 2/20 (3 overs)		Claudie Cooper 16 (8); Poppy Tulloch 3/12 (3 overs)

Berkshire won by 15 runs
Chipstead Coulsdon & Walcountians Cricket Club, Chipstead

- Surrey won the toss and elected to bowl.
- Points: Berkshire 15, Surrey 3

11 August 2024
10:30 BST
Scorecard

Kent; 135/4 (20 overs)	v	Berkshire; 139/4 (19.1 overs)
Emily Thompson 38 (28); Ava Lee 2/22 (4 overs)		Ariana Dowse 37 (47); Lucy Blincoe 1/21 (3.1 overs)

Berkshire won by 6 wickets
Cookham Dean Cricket Club, Cookham

- Berkshire won the toss and elected to bowl.
- Points: Berkshire 8, Kent 6

11 August 2024
10:30 BST
Scorecard

Suffolk; 94/8 (20 overs)	v	Sussex; 97/2 (15.5 overs)
Sophie Singer 19 (37); Beth Harvey 3/11 (3 overs)		Lucy Western 43* (48); Isobel Sidhu 1/19 (4 overs)

Sussex won by 8 wickets
Haverhill Cricket Club, Haverhill

- Sussex won the toss and elected to bowl.
- Points: Sussex 14, Suffolk 0

11 August 2024
10:30 BST
Scorecard

Surrey; 157/5 (20 overs)	v	Essex; 119/7 (20 overs)
Laxmi Johal 43 (39); Jasmine Westley 1/11 (1 over)		Amuruthaa Surenkumar 44 (43); Amy Gordon 2/25 (4 overs)

Surrey won by 38 runs
St George's College, Weybridge

- Surrey won the toss and elected to bat.
- Points: Surrey 8, Essex 4

11 August 2024
13:30 BST
Scorecard

Essex; 148/5 (20 overs)	v	Buckinghamshire; 80 (17.2 overs)
Yasmin Daswani 42 (45); Tegan Stockdale 2/23 (4 overs)		Lucy Warren 18 (20); Ashmitaa Surenkumar 4/16 (4 overs)

Essex won by 68 runs
St George's College, Weybridge

- Buckinghamshire won the toss and elected to bowl.
- Points: Essex 17, Buckinghamshire 0

11 August 2024
13:30 BST
Scorecard

Kent; 122/5 (20 overs)	v	Hertfordshire; 123/4 (17.2 overs)
Coco Streets 30 (33); Chloe Eayrs 2/16 (4 overs)		Gemma Marriott 49* (34); Kaya Clark 1/16 (3.2 overs)

Hertfordshire won by 6 wickets
Cookham Dean Cricket Club, Cookham

- Hertfordshire won the toss and elected to bowl.
- Points: Hertfordshire 16, Kent 5

11 August 2024
13:30 BST
Scorecard

Sussex; 122/5 (20 overs)	v	Middlesex; 94 (19.5 overs)
Mollie Adams 39 (52); Isabella Routledge 1/7 (3 overs)		Isabella Routledge 24 (35); Chiara Green 4/15 (4 overs)

Sussex won by 28 runs
Haverhill Cricket Club, Haverhill

- Middlesex won the toss and elected to bowl.
- Points: Sussex 14, Middlesex 4

11 August 2024
16:30 BST
Scorecard

Hertfordshire; 179/6 (20 overs)	v	Berkshire; 156/8 (20 overs)
Amelia Kemp 56 (51); Shayna Chikhlia 2/30 (4 overs)		Izzy Storrar 41 (32); Kezie Hassall 3/14 (2 overs)

Hertfordshire won by 23 runs
Cookham Dean Cricket Club, Cookham

- Hertfordshire won the toss and elected to bat.
- Points: Hertfordshire 16, Berkshire 7

11 August 2024
16:30 BST
Scorecard

Suffolk; 125/7 (20 overs)	v	Middlesex; 128/5 (20 overs)
Sophie Singer 42 (43); Jenny Blofeld 3/16 (3 overs)		Gayatri Gole 41* (38)

Middlesex won by 5 wickets
Haverhill Cricket Club, Haverhill
Umpires: Martin White and S Whitfield

- Suffolk won the toss and elected to bat.
- Points: Middlesex 17, Suffolk 0

11 August 2024
16:30 BST
Scorecard

Buckinghamshire; 85 (20 overs)	v	Surrey; 86/5 (13.1 overs)
Lucy Warren 28 (32); Amy Gordon 3/8 (3 overs)		Madeleine Blinkhorn-Jones 19* (26); Natasha MacBean 1/14 (3 overs)

Surrey won by 5 wickets
St George's College, Weybridge
Umpires: D Hunt and G Taylor

- Buckinghamshire won the toss and elected to bat.
- Points: Surrey 8, Buckinghamshire 0

=== Group 4 ===
26 May 2024
10:30 BST
Scorecard

Wales	v	Wiltshire

Match Abandoned
Spytty Park, Newport

- No toss.
- No play possible due to rain.
- Points: Wales 2, Wiltshire 2

26 May 2024
10:30 BST
Scorecard

Devon	v	Cornwall

Match Abandoned
Ivybridge Cricket Club, Ivybridge

- No toss.
- No play possible due to rain.
- Points: Devon 2, Cornwall 2

26 May 2024
10:30 BST
Scorecard

Oxfordshire; 101 (16.5 overs)	v	Hampshire; 105/6 (19.3 overs)
Genevieve Porter 23 (22); Caitlin Chissell 2/12 (2 overs)		Finty Trussler 30 (40); Chloe Westbury 2/10 (4 overs)

Hampshire won by 4 wickets
Bicester & North Oxford Cricket Club, Bicester

- Hampshire won the toss and elected to bowl.
- Points: Hampshire 17, Oxfordshire 3

26 May 2024
13:30 BST
Scorecard

Gloucestershire	v	Cornwall

Match Abandoned
Ivybridge Cricket Club, Ivybridge

- No toss.
- No play possible due to rain.
- Points: Gloucestershire 2, Cornwall 2

26 May 2024
13:30 BST
Scorecard

Hampshire; 85/9 (20 overs)	v	Somerset; 31/2 (5.4 overs)
Pippa Sproul 30 (54); Nicole Harvey 2/6 (3 overs)		Lilly Hawkins 14* (14); Gemma Lane 1/1 (1 over)

Somerset won by 8 wickets (DLS)
Bicester & North Oxford Cricket Club, Bicester

- Hampshire won the toss and elected to bat.
- Somerset innings reduced to 6 overs due to rain; target was 30.
- Points: Somerset 14, Hampshire 2

26 May 2024
13:30 BST
Scorecard

Wiltshire	v	Dorset

Match Abandoned
Spytty Park, Newport

- No toss.
- No play possible due to rain.
- Points: Wiltshire 2, Dorset 2

26 May 2024
16:30 BST
Scorecard

Wales	v	Dorset

Match Abandoned
Spytty Park, Newport

- No toss.
- No play possible due to rain.
- Points: Wales 2, Dorset 2

26 May 2024
16:30 BST
Scorecard

Devon	v	Gloucestershire

Match Abandoned
Ivybridge Cricket Club, Ivybridge

- No toss.
- No play possible due to rain.
- Points: Devon 2, Gloucestershire 2

26 May 2024
16:30 BST
Scorecard

Oxfordshire; 149/2 (20 overs)	v	Somerset; 87/8 (20 overs)
Abi Norgrove 84* (58); Nicole Harvey 1/16 (4 overs)		Lilly Hawkins 25 (32); Maya Barnwell 2/20 (4 overs)

Oxfordshire won by 62 runs
Bicester & North Oxford Cricket Club, Bicester

- Oxfordshire won the toss and elected to bat.
- Points: Oxfordshire 14, Somerset 2

16 June 2024
10:30 BST
Scorecard

Cornwall; 139/2 (20 overs)	v	Dorset; 142/5 (20 overs)
Caitlin Burnett 75* (64); Naomi Hillman 1/20 (4 overs)		Megan Bishop 58 (51); Hannah Dodd 2/19 (4 overs)

Dorset won by 5 wickets
The Leaze, Wimborne Minster
Umpires: Jim Hicken and Derek Russell

- Cornwall won the toss and elected to bat.
- Points: Dorset 13, Cornwall 7

16 June 2024
10:30 BST
Scorecard

Wales; 128/4 (20 overs)	v	Somerset; 89/5 (20 overs)
Bethan Gammon 54* (44); Ella Stewart 2/14 (4 overs)		Laila Moledina 30* (41); Ffion Wynne 2/14 (4 overs)

Wales won by 39 runs
Queen's College, Taunton

- Wales won the toss and elected to bat.
- Points: Wales 13, Somerset 3

16 June 2024
10:30 BST
Scorecard

Devon; 159/4 (20 overs)	v	Wiltshire; 131/5 (20 overs)
Ellie Bishop 58 (43); Flo Sharman 1/5 (1 over)		Flo Sharman 52 (46); Katie Donovan 2/16 (4 overs)

Devon won by 28 runs
Potterne Cricket Club, Potterne

- Devon won the toss and elected to bat.
- Points: Devon 16, Wiltshire 6

16 June 2024
13:30 BST
Scorecard

Wales; 112/4 (20 overs)	v	Gloucestershire; 96 (19.2 overs)
Libby Thomas 53* (65); Mollie Robbins 1/14 (4 overs)		Bea Ellis 17 (16); Sara Phillips 4/15 (4 overs)

Wales won by 16 runs
Queen's College, Taunton

- Wales won the toss and elected to bat.
- Points: Wales 14, Gloucestershire 3

16 June 2024
13:30 BST
Scorecard

Devon; 60 (17.2 overs)	v	Hampshire; 63/3 (11.2 overs)
Amelia Munday 19 (7); Gemma Lane 2/5 (3 overs)		Danielle Ransley 15* (12); Eva Lewis 1/3 (1 over)

Hampshire won by 7 wickets
Potterne Cricket Club, Potterne

- Devon won the toss and elected to bat.
- Points: Hampshire 15, Devon 4

16 June 2024
13:30 BST
Scorecard

Oxfordshire; 197/4 (20 overs)	v	Cornwall; 111/9 (20 overs)
Lottie Oxton 87* (47); Issey White 1/26 (4 overs)		Rebecca Odgers 40 (24); Lottie Oxton 4/29 (4 overs)

Oxfordshire won by 86 runs
The Leaze, Wimborne Minster

- Oxfordshire won the toss and elected to bat.
- Points: Oxfordshire 18, Cornwall 6

16 June 2024
16:30 BST
Scorecard

Oxfordshire; 174/9 (20 overs)	v	Dorset; 96/7 (20 overs)
Aimee Diab 62 (46); Loren Dean 3/22 (4 overs)		Emily Roberts 25 (27); Maya Barnwell 1/11 (4 overs)

Oxfordshire won by 78 runs
The Leaze, Wimborne Minster
Umpires: Nick Heckford and Jim Hicken

- Oxfordshire won the toss and elected to bat.
- Points: Oxfordshire 18, Dorset 6

16 June 2024
16:30 BST
Scorecard

Gloucestershire; 92/8 (20 overs)	v	Somerset; 94/4 (19.1 overs)
Rebecca Halliday 48* (53); Evie Dixon 3/7 (3 overs)		Laila Moledina 36* (56); Isobel Patel 1/9 (2.1 overs)

Somerset won by 6 wickets
Queen's College, Taunton

- Gloucestershire won the toss and elected to bat.
- Points: Somerset 15, Gloucestershire 2

16 June 2024
16:30 BST
Scorecard

Hampshire; 104/8 (20 overs)	v	Wiltshire; 108/8 (17.5 overs)
Pippa Sproul 29 (25); Sophie Gaiger 3/23 (4 overs)		Isla Thomson 29 (27); Amy Mills 3/12 (3 overs)

Wiltshire won by 2 wickets
Potterne Cricket Club, Potterne

- Hampshire won the toss and elected to bat.
- Points: Wiltshire 16, Hampshire 7

28 July 2024
10:30 BST
Scorecard

Somerset; 147/6 (20 overs)	v	Cornwall; 98/7 (20 overs)
Jess Hazell 38 (37); Kellie Williams 3/5 (3 overs)		Rebecca Odgers 31 (31); Karla Rose 3/17 (4 overs)

Somerset won by 49 runs
Wadebridge Cricket Club, Wadebridge

- Cornwall won the toss and elected to bowl.
- Points: Somerset 15, Cornwall 6

28 July 2024
10:30 BST
Scorecard

Oxfordshire; 140/5 (20 overs)	v	Devon; 141/4 (19.3 overs)
Abi Norgrove 61 (54); Regina Lili'i 4/14 (4 overs)		Emma Corney 40 (32); Chloe Westbury 2/26 (4 overs)

Devon won by 6 wickets
Exeter University Sports Ground, Exeter
Umpires: Denis Smith and Marilyn MacQueen

- Oxfordshire won the toss and elected to bat.
- Points: Devon 15, Oxfordshire 6

28 July 2024
10:30 BST
Scorecard

Gloucestershire; 143/6 (20 overs)	v	Hampshire; 84 (16.1 overs)
Chloe Skelton 49 (39); Caitlin Chissell 2/11 (4 overs)		Annabella Mitchell 18 (19); Charlie Phillips 3/12 (3.1 overs)

Gloucestershire won by 59 runs
King Edward VI School, Southampton

- Gloucestershire won the toss and elected to bat.
- Points: Gloucestershire 16, Hampshire 6

28 July 2024
13:30 BST
Scorecard

Wales; 177/4 (20 overs)	v	Oxfordshire; 109 (18.2 overs)
Bethan Gammon 73 (39); Aimee Diab 1/11 (1 over)		Ellie Ingram 22 (21); Lydia Clements 3/13 (2.2 overs)

Wales won by 68 runs
Exeter University Sports Ground, Exeter

- Wales won the toss and elected to bat.
- Points: Wales 18, Oxfordshire 4

28 July 2024
13:30 BST
Scorecard

Gloucestershire; 176/3 (20 overs)	v	Dorset; 45 (15 overs)
Emily Geach 38 (22); Anya Hughes 1/23 (3 overs)		Lizzie Williams 14 (13); Emily Geach 3/10 (3 overs)

Gloucestershire won by 131 runs
King Edward VI School, Southampton

- Gloucestershire won the toss and elected to bat.
- Points: Gloucestershire 19, Dorset 3

28 July 2024
13:30 BST
Scorecard

Somerset; 98/7 (20 overs)	v	Wiltshire; 38 (17.2 overs)
Daisy Jeanes 29 (24); Emily Smith 4/9 (4 overs)		Daisy Hunt 15 (21); Ela Stewart 3/2 (4 overs)

Somerset won by 60 runs
Wadebridge Cricket Club, Wadebridge

- Somerset won the toss and elected to bat.
- Points: Somerset 16, Wiltshire 3

28 July 2024
16:30 BST
Scorecard

Wiltshire; 132/8 (20 overs)	v	Cornwall; 81/9 (20 overs)
Flo Sharman 38 (43); Rebecca Odgers 2/15 (4 overs)		Isabel Grant-French 35 (31); Poppy Walker 4/8 (4 overs)

Wiltshire won by 51 runs
Wadebridge Cricket Club, Wadebridge

- Wiltshire won the toss and elected to bat.
- Points: Wiltshire 17, Cornwall 4

28 July 2024
16:30 BST
Scorecard

Wales; 107/4 (20 overs)	v	Devon; 110/0 (11.4 overs)
Bethan Gammon 48* (49); Erin Vukusic 1/16 (2 overs)		Amelie Munday 55* (38)

Devon won by 10 wickets
Topsham Sports Field, Topsham

- Wales won the toss and elected to bat.
- Points: Devon 14, Wales 3

28 July 2024
16:30 BST
Scorecard

Hampshire; 174/3 (20 overs)	v	Dorset; 108/9 (20 overs)
Rachel King 64 (45); Megan Bishop 2/30 (4 overs)		Mollie Joyce 32 (28); Caitlin Chissell 4/19 (4 overs)

Hampshire won the toss and elected to bat.
King Edward VI School, Southampton

- Hampshire won the toss and elected to bat.
- Points: Hampshire 20, Dorset 5

11 August 2024
10:30 BST
Scorecard

Devon; 128/7 (20 overs)	v	Dorset; 82/9 (20 overs)
Emma Corney 64 (45); Loren Dean 2/11 (3 overs)		Sarah Matthews 13 (19); Eva Lewis 3/15 (4 overs)

Devon won by 46 runs
Hamworthy Cricket Club, Hamworthy
Umpires: Derek Russell and Cledwyn Davies

- Devon won the toss and elected to bat.
- Points: Devon 15, Dorset 5

11 August 2024
10:30 BST
Scorecard

Gloucestershire; 146/4 (20 overs)	v	Oxfordshire; 46 (11.3 overs)
Bea Ellis 87* (65); Chloe Westbury 2/20 (4 overs)		Lottie Oxton 14 (18); Bhoomika Bhat 2/6 (1.3 overs)

Gloucestershire won by 100 runs
Brislington Cricket Club, Brislington

- Gloucestershire won the toss and elected to bat.
- Points: Gloucestershire 17, Oxfordshire 4

11 August 2024
10:30 BST
[https://ecbwcountychampionship.play-cricket.com/website/results/6114171 Scorecard

Hampshire	v	Cornwall

Hampshire won via walkover
King Edward VI School, Southampton

- Points: Hampshire 20, Cornwall 0

11 August 2024
13:30 BST
Scorecard

Wales	v	Cornwall

Wales won via walkover
King Edward VI School, Southampton

- Points: Wales 20, Cornwall 0

11 August 2024
13:30 BST
Scorecard

Devon; 132/2 (20 overs)	v	Somerset; 133/3 (19.5 overs)
Emma Corney 50* (57); Emily Edgcombe 1/17 (2 overs)		Laila Moledina 62* (59); Eva Lewis 3/12 (4 overs)

Somerset won by 7 wickets
Hamworthy Cricket Club, Hamworthy

- Devon won the toss and elected to bat.
- Points: Somerset 13, Devon 4

11 August 2024
13:30 BST
Scorecard

Oxfordshire; 165/4 (20 overs)	v	Wiltshire; 137/8 (20 overs)
Abi Norgrove 73 (48); Poppy Walker 3/40 (4 overs)		Poppy Walker 28 (28); Katie Waugh 2/16 (3 overs)

Oxfordshire won by 28 runs
Brislington Cricket Club, Brislington

- Oxfordshire won the toss and elected to bat.
- Points: Oxfordshire 17, Wiltshire 0

11 August 2024
16:30 BST
Scorecard

Somerset; 145/9 (20 overs)	v	Dorset; 43 (18.3 overs)
Daisy Jeanes 47 (38); Kelsey Rees 3/33 (4 overs)		Megan Bishop 16 (25); Lorraine Szczepanski 3/12 (4 overs)

Somerset won by 102 runs
Hamworthy Cricket Club, Hamworthy
Umpires: Nick Heckford and Derek Russell

- Dorset won the toss and elected to field.
- Points: Somerset 18, Dorset 5

11 August 2024
16:30 BST
Scorecard

Gloucestershire; 138/3 (20 overs)	v	Wiltshire; 109 (19.4 overs)
Rebecca Halliday 44* (29); Jenny Heppell 1/23 (4 overs)		Poppy Walker 45* (40); Mollie Robbins 2/5 (3 overs)

Gloucestershire won by 29 runs
Brislington Cricket Club, Brislington

- Gloucestershire won the toss and elected to bat.
- Points: Gloucestershire 16, Wiltshire 4

11 August 2024
16:30 BST
Scorecard

Hampshire; 134 (19.4 overs)	v	Wales; 127/8 (20 overs)
Finty Trussler 24 (15); Nicole Reid 3/19 (4 overs)		Bethan Gammon 34 (33); Eve O'Neill 3/17 (4 overs)

Hampshire won by 7 runs
King Edward VI School, Southampton

- Hampshire won the toss and elected to bat.
- Points: Hampshire 15, Wales 0

== National Finals ==
=== Standings ===
Pos	Team	Pld	W	L	T	NR	BP	Pts	NRR
1	Derbyshire (C)	3	3	0	0	0	10	34	0.780
2	Hertfordshire	3	2	1	0	0	14	30	0.470
3	Hampshire	3	1	2	0	0	7	15	0.120
4	Warwickshire	3	0	3	0	0	10	10	−1.360

Source: Play-Cricket

=== Fixtures ===
25 August 2024
13:30 BST
Scorecard

Derbyshire; 120/6 (20 overs)	v	Hampshire; 112/6 (20 overs)
Megan Pittman 38* (37); Eve O'Neill 2/21 (3 overs)		Finty Trussler 49 (59); Pagan Hardwick 2/19 (4 overs)

Derbyshire won by 8 runs
Neston Cricket Club, Neston

- Hampshire won the toss and elected to bowl.
- Points: Derbyshire 12, Hampshire 3

25 August 2024
13:30 BST
Scorecard

Hertfordshire; 147/5 (20 overs)	v	Warwickshire; 102/5 (20 overs)
Gemma Marriott 33 (30); Gemma Porter 2/21 (4 overs)		Ava Clive 28* (37); Rebecca Tyson 2/14 (4 overs)

Hertfordshire won by 45 runs
Neston Cricket Club, Neston
Umpires: Kirsty Blackham and Amy Coyne

- Warwickshire won the toss and elected to bowl.
- Points: Hertfordshire 15, Warwickshire 3

26 August 2024
10:30 BST
Scorecard

Derbyshire; 90/7 (20 overs)	v	Warwickshire; 86 (19.4 overs)
Adrianna Darlow 20 (33); Emily Churms 2/14 (4 overs)		Gwenan Davies 29 (27); Adrianna Darlow 2/11 (4 overs)

Derbyshire won by 4 runs
Neston Cricket Club, Neston
Umpires: Amy Coyne and Kelly Wainwright

- Derbyshire won the toss and elected to bat.
- Points: Derbyshire 14, Warwickshire 7

26 August 2024
10:30 BST
Scorecard

Hampshire; 121 (19 overs)	v	Hertfordshire; 122/1 (17.2 overs)
Pippa Sproul 52 (53); Kezia Hassall 3/7 (2 overs)		Elsa Barnfather 53* (49); Sophie Mitchelmore 1/17 (2 overs)

Hertfordshire won by 9 wickets
Neston Cricket Club, Neston

- Hampshire won the toss and elected to bat.
- Points: Hertfordshire 14, Hampshire 4

26 August 2024
14:30 BST
Scorecard

Derbyshire; 142/5 (20 overs)	v	Hertfordshire; 107/7 (20 overs)
Megan Pittman 66* (60); Rebecca Tyson 2/27 (4 overs)		Amelia Kemp 24 (37); Adrianna Darlow 4/17 (4 overs)

Derbyshire won by 35 runs
Neston Cricket Club, Neston

- Hertfordshire won the toss and elected to bowl.
- Points: Derbyshire 14, Hertfordshire 4

26 August 2024
14:30 BST
Scorecard

Warwickshire; 96 (19.5 overs)	v	Hampshire; 97/3 (14.5 overs)
Laura Crofts 15 (18); Eve O'Neill 2/11 (4 overs)		Finty Trussler 40 (37); Elizabeth Russell 2/12 (3 overs)

Hampshire won by 7 wickets
Neston Cricket Club, Neston

- Warwickshire won the toss and elected to bat.
- Points: Hampshire 16, Warwickshire 2

== Statistics ==
=== Most runs ===
Player	Team	Matches	Innings	Runs	Average	HS	100s	50s
Lara Shaw	Derbyshire	10	10	306	38.25	106*	1	0
Amelia Kemp	Hertfordshire	11	9	288	36.00	72	0	2
Abi Norgrove	Oxfordshire	8	8	284	40.57	84*	0	3
Elsa Barnfather	Hertfordshire	11	9	239	34.14	63*	0	2
Megan Pittman	Derbyshire	10	10	231	33.00	66*	0	2

Source: Play-Cricket

=== Most wickets ===
Player	Team	Overs	Wickets	Average	BBI	5w
Emma Thatcher	Derbyshire	38.0	18	9.22	4/11	0
Maria Andrews	Derbyshire	35.3	15	11.00	3/15	0
Rebecca Tyson	Hertfordshire	34.0	15	12.47	3/7	0
Flora Bertwistle	Worcestershire	24.0	14	5.29	4/13	0
Pagan Hardwick	Derbyshire	33.4	14	12.57	4/12	0

Source: Play-Cricket
