= Hayley Brown =

English cricketer

Personal information
- Full name: Hayley May Brown
- Born: 25 March 1998 (age 28)
- Batting: Right-handed
- Bowling: Right-arm leg break
- Role: Batter

Domestic team information
- Years: Team
- 2014: Huntingdonshire
- 2015–2020: Northamptonshire
- 2020: Sunrisers
- 2021: Essex
- 2022–2024: Northamptonshire
- 2025–present: Leicestershire

Career statistics
| Competition | WLA | WT20 |
|---|---|---|
| Matches | 29 | 52 |
| Runs scored | 507 | 678 |
| Batting average | 22.04 | 19.37 |
| 100s/50s | 1/2 | 0/0 |
| Top score | 111* | 43* |
| Balls bowled | 18 | 36 |
| Wickets | 0 | 0 |
| Bowling average | – | – |
| 5 wickets in innings | 0 | 0 |
| 10 wickets in match | 0 | 0 |
| Best bowling | – | – |
| Catches/stumpings | 11/– | 17/– |
- Source: CricketArchive, 23 October 2023

Hayley May Brown (born 25 March 1998) is an English cricketer who currently plays for Leicestershire. She plays as a right-handed batter. She previously played for Huntingdonshire, Essex, Northamptonshire and Sunrisers.

== Domestic career ==
Brown made her county debut in 2014, for Huntingdonshire against Cambridgeshire, top-scoring for her side with 16*. The following season, she joined Northamptonshire. Brown was part of the side that won promotion in both the County Championship and Twenty20 Cup in 2017, and was her side's leading run-scorer in the Championship, with 125 runs including her maiden county half-century. In 2019, Brown was again her side's leading run-scorer in the County Championship, this time scoring 232 runs including her maiden county century, scoring 111* against Cambridgeshire and Huntingdonshire. Northamptonshire also topped their division in both competitions that season.

In 2020, Brown played for Sunrisers in the Rachael Heyhoe Flint Trophy. She played one match, scoring 16 against South East Stars.

In 2021, Brown joined Essex, and played four matches for the side in the Twenty20 Cup, scoring 42 runs. She was also included in Sunrisers' Academy squad for the season. In 2022, she returned to Northamptonshire, playing six matches for the side in the East of England Women's County Championship, where she was the fifth-highest run-scorer in the tournament, with 172 runs at an average of 34.40. She played eight matches for the side in the 2023 Women's Twenty20 Cup, scoring 97 runs at an average of 24.25.
