= 2021 English cricket season =

County Championship
- Champions: Warwickshire
- Runners-up: Lancashire
- Most runs: Tom Haines (1,176)
- Most wickets: Luke Fletcher (66)

Royal London One-Day Cup
- Champions: Glamorgan
- Runners-up: Durham
- Most runs: Graham Clark (646)
- Most wickets: Joe Cooke (19)

T20 Blast
- Champions: Kent Spitfires
- Runners-up: Somerset
- Most runs: Josh Inglis (531)
- Most wickets: Naveen-ul-Haq (26)

Rachael Heyhoe Flint Trophy
- Champions: Southern Vipers
- Runners-up: Northern Diamonds
- Most runs: Sophie Luff (417)
- Most wickets: Kirstie Gordon (16)

Charlotte Edwards Cup
- Champions: South East Stars
- Runners-up: Northern Diamonds
- Most runs: Evelyn Jones (276)
- Most wickets: Bryony Smith (14)

Bob Willis Trophy
- Champions: Warwickshire
- Runners-up: Lancashire
- Most runs: Will Rhodes (156)
- Most wickets: Craig Miles (6)

The Hundred
- Champions: Oval Invincibles (Women's); Southern Brave (Men's)
- Runners-up: Southern Brave (Women's); Birmingham Phoenix (Men's)
- Most runs: Dane van Niekerk (Women's) (259); Liam Livingstone (Men's) (348)
- Most wickets: Tash Farrant (Women's) (18); Adam Milne (Men's) (12)

PCA Player of the Year
- Joe Root (Men's); Evelyn Jones (Women's)

Wisden Cricketers of the Year
- Zak Crawley, Darren Stevens, Jason Holder, Dom Sibley, Mohammad Rizwan

The 2021 English cricket season began on 4 April and finished on 3 October 2021. It was the 121st season in which the County Championship has been an official competition and featured First-Class, List-A and Twenty20 cricket competitions throughout England and Wales.

The 18 first-class counties competed in the 2021 County Championship, One-Day Cup and T20 Blast competitions, whilst the women's regional teams competed for the Rachael Heyhoe Flint Trophy and the inaugural Charlotte Edwards Cup. The season also saw the inaugural season of The Hundred, which was not held due to the COVID-19 pandemic in 2020.

The season also had the 2021 Bob Willis Trophy, which was played as a five-day final between the teams that finished first and second in County Championship Division One.

== International Tours ==
Four international men's sides toured the country this season: New Zealand, Sri Lanka, Pakistan and India. New Zealand and India's women's sides also toured this season to play limited overs series and multi-format series matches, respectively.

=== New Zealand tour ===
In June 2021, New Zealand toured England to play two Test matches, prior to playing the inaugural final of 2019–2021 ICC World Test Championship which was held at Southampton.

New Zealand played two test matches against England at Lord's and Edgbaston. The first test ended in a draw and New Zealand won the second test by 8 wickets to win the series 1–0. Prior to the Test series, New Zealand was scheduled to play a tour match against Somerset which was cancelled due to COVID-19 pandemic. Thus, New Zealand played an intra-squad match for preparation.

=== Sri Lanka tour ===
During the end of the June and July, Sri Lanka played three ODIs and three T20Is against England.

England won all the three T20I matches to win the series 3–0.

England won the first two ODI matches to win the series 2–0, and the third ODI ended as No result being washed out by the rain after Sri Lanka's first innings.

Before the start of the series, Sri Lanka were scheduled to play two one-day tour matches against Kent and Sussex, which were cancelled due to COVID-19 pandemic. Thus, Sri Lanka played a 50-over and also a 20-over intra-squad match at Manchester.

=== Pakistan tour ===
In July 2021, Pakistan toured England to play three ODIs and three T20Is.

England won all the three ODIs to win the series 3–0.

Pakistan won the first T20I at Nottingham. England won the last two T20Is to win the series 2–1. Prior to the ODI series, Pakistan were scheduled to play two one-day matches against Northamptonshire and Worcestershire, which were cancelled due to safety concerns. Instead, they were due to had two 50-over intra-squad matches, with the second match was cancelled due to rain.

=== India tour ===
India toured England to play a five-match test series during August. Prior to the England series, India were scheduled to play the inaugural final of 2019–2021 ICC World Test Championship from 18 to 22 June at Southampton.

The first Test at Trent Bridge was affected by rain and was ended in a draw. India won the second Test match at Lord's, with England winning the third Test at Headingley. India won the fourth Test at The Oval to lead the series 2–1. The fifth and final Test match at Manchester was cancelled due to COVID-19 cases in the Indian team's coaching and support staff, with the result of the series yet to be decided officially.

Before the start of the series, India were scheduled to play two intra-squad warm-up matches against India A at Northampton and Leicester, which were called off following the cancellation of India A tour of England due to COVID-19 pandemic. Later, India were planned to play two first-class matches against counties, which was replaced by intra-squad warm-up matches at Durham. Finally, India were played a three-day warm-up match against a County Select XI at Durham.

=== India women's tour ===
In June and July 2021, the India women's cricket team toured England, playing one WTest, three WODIs and three WT20Is. The Test match was the first such match that India had played since 2014. The Test match was drawn, whilst England won both the WODI and WT20I series 2–1.

=== New Zealand women's tour ===
In September 2021, the New Zealand women's cricket team toured England to play three WT20Is and five WODIs. England won the WT20I series 2–1, and the WODI series 4–1.

== Domestic cricket ==
=== County Championship ===
The men's County Championship began on 8 April and ended on 24 September. In the first stage on the competition, the eighteen counties were divided into three groups of six, playing each team in their group twice, playing ten matches overall. The top two teams from each group progressed to Division One for the second phase of the competition, with the next two teams in each group progressing to Division Two and the bottom two teams in each group moving to Division Three. Teams then played a further four matches in the division stage, with the winner of Division One becoming the county champions. Warwickshire won the County Championship.

Following the end of the County Championship season, the top two sides in Division One competed for the Bob Willis Trophy in a five-day final at Lord's. Warwickshire beat Lancashire by an innings and 199 runs.

=== Royal London One-Day Cup ===
The Royal London One-Day Cup took place in July and August, with the eighteen counties divided into two groups of nine. The final, which took place at Trent Bridge, was won by Glamorgan, who beat Durham by 58 runs.

=== T20 Blast ===
The T20 Blast began on 9 June, with the eighteen counties divided into two regional groups of nine. Finals Day took place on 18 September at Edgbaston Cricket Ground, with Kent beating Somerset in the final by 25 runs.

=== The Hundred ===
The inaugural season of The Hundred took place in 2021, having been delayed for a year due to the COVID-19 pandemic. Eight men's and eight women's teams competed in the tournament, which took place in July and August. Oval Invincibles won the women's competition, whilst Southern Brave won the men's competition.

=== Rachael Heyhoe Flint Trophy ===
The Rachael Heyhoe Flint Trophy began on 29 May, with eight regional teams competing in a round-robin group. The final took place on 25 September at the County Ground, Northampton, a repeat of the previous year's final between Southern Vipers and Northern Diamonds. Southern Vipers once again won the tournament.

=== Charlotte Edwards Cup ===
The inaugural season of the Charlotte Edwards Cup (initially named the Women's Regional T20) took place in 2021, running from June to September. The eight teams were divided into two groups, with South East Stars, Northern Diamonds and Southern Vipers progressing to Finals Day at the Rose Bowl. South East Stars beat Northern Diamonds by 5 wickets in the final.

=== Women's County Cricket ===
The Women's Twenty20 Cup returned in 2021, having been cancelled in 2020 due to the COVID-19 pandemic. The tournament had no overall winner, instead having six regional winners. Various regional county competitions also took place: the East of England Women's County Championship, the Women's London Championship and the Women's London Cup.

=== National Counties Cricket ===
The National Counties Championship took place between July and September, with the final won by Oxfordshire over Suffolk. The NCCA Knockout Trophy took place between May and September, with Berkshire beating Cumbria in the final.
