= Bex Tyson =

English cricketer

Personal information
- Full name: Rebecca Elizabeth Ann Tyson
- Born: 26 June 2000 (age 26)
- Nickname: Bex
- Batting: Left-handed
- Bowling: Slow left-arm orthodox
- Role: Bowler

Domestic team information
- Years: Team
- 2015–2017; 2022-2024: Hertfordshire
- 2018–2019: Middlesex
- 2024: Southern Vipers
- 2025 - present: Hampshire
- 2026 - Manchester Supergiants: London Spirit

Career statistics
Competition	WLA	WT20
Matches	22	39
Runs scored	139	311
Batting average	12.63	20.73
100s/50s	0/0	0/1
Top score	40	67*
Balls bowled	679	641
Wickets	24	46
Bowling average	15.91	11.41
5 wickets in innings	1	0
10 wickets in match	0	0
Best bowling	5/23	4/8
Catches/stumpings	6/–	9/–
- Source: CricketArchive, 18 October 2024

Rebecca Elizabeth Ann "Bex" Tyson (born 26 June 2000) is an English cricketer who currently plays for Hampshire. She plays as a slow left-arm orthodox bowler. She has previously played for, Hertfordshire, Middlesex and Southern Vipers.

== Domestic career ==
Tyson made her county debut in 2015, for Hertfordshire against Leicestershire. She took 4/19 for the side in a 2016 Women's County Championship match against Cambridgeshire and Huntingdonshire. She was the side's leading wicket-taker in both the 2017 Women's County Championship and the 2017 Women's Twenty20 Cup, with 10 and 12 wickets respectively.

Tyson joined Middlesex ahead of the 2018 season, playing for the side for two seasons. She re-joined Hertfordshire for the 2022 season, and was the joint-leading wicket-taker across the entire competition in the 2023 Women's Twenty20 Cup, with 12 wickets at an average of 5.33. She took 15 wickets at an average of 12.47 in the 2024 Women's Twenty20 Cup, the joint-second highest wicket-taker in the competition, as her side finished as runners-up.

In 2024, Tyson played for Sunrisers 2nd XI, including taking 4/18 for the side against South East Stars. Later that season, on 29 August, it was announced that Tyson had signed a Pay As You Play contract with Southern Vipers. She made her debut for the side on 4 September 2024, against Northern Diamonds in the Rachael Heyhoe Flint Trophy, taking 3/49 from her 10 overs.
