= Chloe Hill =

English cricketer

Personal information
- Full name: Chloe Anne Elizabeth Hill
- Born: 3 January 1997 (age 29); Aylesbury, Buckinghamshire, England
- Batting: Right-handed
- Role: Wicket-keeper

Domestic team information
- Years: Team
- 2012–2015: Buckinghamshire
- 2016–2025: Worcestershire
- 2020–2022: Central Sparks
- 2022: → Southern Vipers (on loan)
- 2022: Buckinghamshire
- 2023: Southern Vipers
- 2023: → South East Stars (on loan)
- 2023: London Spirit
- 2024: South East Stars

Career statistics
Competition	WLA	WT20
Matches	72	86
Runs scored	890	1,240
Batting average	16.48	20.32
100s/50s	0/3	0/6
Top score	78	93*
Balls bowled	–	18
Wickets	–	0
Bowling average	–	–
5 wickets in innings	–	0
10 wickets in match	–	0
Best bowling	–	–
Catches/stumpings	36/13	31/30
- Source: CricketArchive, 18 October 2024

Chloe Anne Elizabeth Hill (born 3 January 1997) is an English cricketer. She plays as a wicket-keeper and right-handed batter. She has previously played for Worcestershire Rapids, Buckinghamshire, Central Sparks, Southern Vipers, South East Stars and London Spirit.

== Early life ==
Hill was born on 3 January 1997 in Aylesbury, Buckinghamshire.

== Domestic career ==
Hill made her county debut in 2012, for Buckinghamshire against Norfolk. In 2014, Hill was Buckinghamshire's leading run-scorer in the Twenty20 Cup, with 147 runs including her Twenty20 high score of 80*, against Suffolk. In 2015, she was the fifth-highest run-scorer across the whole Twenty20 Cup, with 223 runs, including 2 half-centuries.

In 2016, Hill moved to Worcestershire. In 2016, she had the third most dismissals for a wicket-keeper in the Twenty20 Cup, with 3 catches and four stumpings. Two seasons later, Hill was Worcestershire's leading run-scorer in the Twenty20 Cup, with 194 runs, and hit 78 in the Division 3 Final of the County Championship against Cornwall to help her side to promotion. In April 2021, Hill was named as Worcestershire's captain for the 2021 Women's Twenty20 Cup, and scored 64 runs at an average of 21.33 in her five matches for the side that season. She captained Worcestershire to winning their group of the Twenty20 Cup in 2022, as well as scoring 100 runs in the competition. Later that season, she re-joined Buckinghamshire for the South Central Counties Cup, a 50-over competition involving counties from the South of England.

In 2020, Hill played for Central Sparks in the Rachael Heyhoe Flint Trophy. She appeared in 4 matches, scoring 34 runs at an average of 17.00. She hit the winning runs in the Sparks' victory over Northern Diamonds, scoring 23* overall in a 6 wicket victory. In 2021, Hill played 10 matches for the side across the Rachael Heyhoe Flint Trophy and the Charlotte Edwards Cup, with a top score of 34* made in a Rachael Heyhoe Flint Trophy match against Lightning. Hill joined Southern Vipers on loan for the 2022 Charlotte Edwards Cup, but did not play a match. Her loan was later extended to cover the Rachael Heyhoe Flint Trophy. She played six matches for Vipers in the Rachael Heyhoe Flint Trophy, scoring 111 runs including 55 made against Sunrisers. At the end of the 2022 season, it was announced that Hill had joined Southern Vipers on a permanent basis. In April 2023, it was announced that Hill had signed a professional contract with her new side. In June 2023, she joined South East Stars on loan, making her debut for the side on 4 June 2023. Her loan to South East Stars was later renewed for September 2023. Overall, she played six matches for South East Stars that season, scoring 138 runs including one half-century, whilst she did not appear for Southern Vipers. At the end of the 2023 season, it was announced that Hill was joining South East Stars on a permanent basis. In 2024, she played 23 matches for the side, across the Rachael Heyhoe Flint Trophy and the Charlotte Edwards Cup, making 14 dismissals.
