= Rachel Hopkins (cricketer) =

English cricketer and coach

Personal information
- Full name: Rachel Hannah Marie Hopkins
- Born: 19 July 1992 (age 34); Nottingham, England
- Batting: Right-handed
- Bowling: Right-arm medium
- Role: All-rounder

Domestic team information
- Years: Team
- 2007–2017: Derbyshire
- 2018–2019: Durham
- 2020–present: North East Warriors
- 2020–2022: Northern Diamonds

Career statistics
Competition	WLA	WT20
Matches	91	71
Runs scored	1,909	972
Batting average	23.86	18.69
100s/50s	1/8	0/3
Top score	117*	63
Balls bowled	2,144	418
Wickets	58	22
Bowling average	20.66	17.13
5 wickets in innings	0	0
10 wickets in match	0	0
Best bowling	3/5	3/12
Catches/stumpings	33/–	21/–
- Source: CricketArchive, 23 October 2023

Rachel Hannah Marie Hopkins (born 19 July 1992) is an English cricketer who currently plays for North East Warriors. An all-rounder, she is a right-handed batter and right-arm medium bowler. She previously played for Northern Diamonds, Derbyshire and Durham, before they were succeeded by North East Warriors. She is also a High Performance Coach of North East Warriors.

== Early life ==
Hopkins was born on 19 July 1992 in Nottingham.

== Domestic career ==
Hopkins made her county debut in 2007, for Derbyshire against Essex. She hit her maiden county half-century in 2011, scoring 58 against Cambridgeshire and Huntingdonshire, a season in which she was her side's leading run-scorer in the Championship, with 192 runs. In 2014 she was again her side's leading run-scorer in the County Championship, with 279 runs at an average of 34.87. In 2016, Hopkins had a standout season, hitting her maiden county century, 117* against Cheshire, and was Derbyshire's leading run-scorer in both the County Championship and the Twenty20 Cup.

Hopkins moved to Durham ahead of the 2018 season, and was quickly successful, being the side's leading run-scorer in both the 2018 Women's County Championship, with 215 runs at an average of 53.75, and in the 2019 Women's Twenty20 Cup, with 142 runs at an average of 20.28. In 2020, Durham merged with Northumberland to form the North East Warriors. Although the side did not play any competitive matches that season due to the COVID-19 pandemic, Hopkins appeared in two friendlies against Scotland for the team in 2020. In 2021, she scored 59 runs for the side at an average of 24.50 in the Twenty20 Cup. She played one match for the side in the 2022 Women's Twenty20 Cup.

Hopkins is also a coach, having worked for Durham as a Cricket Development Officer from 2018, and, when the side became North East Warriors, becoming a High Performance Coach for the new team.

In 2020, Hopkins played for Northern Diamonds in the Rachael Heyhoe Flint Trophy. She appeared in four matches, scoring 54 runs at an average of 13.50. She played a further twelve matches for the side in 2021, across the Rachael Heyhoe Flint Trophy and the Charlotte Edwards Cup. She played one match for the side in 2022, in the Charlotte Edwards Cup, without batting or bowling. At the end of the 2022 season, Hopkins retired from regional cricket.
