= United States women's cricket team in Zimbabwe in 2024–25 =

International cricket tour

	Zimbabwe	United States
- Dates: 17 – 28 October 2024
Captains	Josephine Nkomo	Aditiba Chudasama

One Day International series
- Results: Zimbabwe won the 5-match series 3–2
Most runs	Modester Mupachikwa (210)	Sindhu Sriharsha (165)
Most wickets	Josephine Nkomo (7)	Aditiba Chudasama (7); Tara Norris (7)
- Player of the series: Josephine Nkomo (Zim)

The United States women's cricket team toured Zimbabwe in October 2024 to play five One Day International (ODI) matches against Zimbabwe women's cricket team. It was the United States women's side's first tour to Zimbabwe and the first ever bilateral series between the two sides. Zimbabwe won the series 3–2.

== Squads ==
Zimbabwe	United States
Josephine Nkomo (c); Beloved Biza; Olinder Chare; Christabel Chatonzwa; Lindokuhle Mabhera; Tendai Makusha; Sharne Mayers; Audrey Mazvishaya; Chipo Mugeri-Tiripano; Modester Mupachikwa (wk); Ashley Ndiraya; Runyararo Pasipanodya; Loryn Phiri; Nomvelo Sibanda; Adel Zimunu	Aditiba Chudasama (c); Anika Kolan (vc, wk); Jivana Aras; Gargi Bhogle; Ella Claridge (wk); Disha Dhingra; Saanvi Immadi; Geetika Kodali; Tara Norris; Chetna Pagydyala; Lekha Shetty; Ritu Singh; Sindhu Sriharsha (wk); Sai Tanmayi Eyyunni; Isani Vaghela

Ahead of the series, USA Cricket announced 18 year-old all-rounder Aditiba Chudasama as the new captain of the United States women's cricket team, replacing Sindhu Sriharsha. Mary-Anne Musonda, the regular captain of Zimbabwe, was not available due to injury.

== ODI series ==
=== 1st ODI ===
17 October 2024
09:15
Scorecard

United States; 152 (43.5 overs)	v	Zimbabwe; 154/5 (34.3 overs)
Anika Kolan 37 (61); Beloved Biza 3/22 (8 overs)		Beloved Biza 38 (51); Tara Norris 2/20 (6 overs)

Zimbabwe won by 5 wickets
Harare Sports Club, Harare
Umpires: Iknow Chabi (Zim) and Stanley Gogwe (Zim)
Player of the match: Beloved Biza (Zim)

- Zimbabwe won the toss and elected to field.
- Beloved Biza, Runyararo Pasipanodya (Zim), Ella Claridge, Tara Norris and Lekha Shetty (USA) all made their ODI debuts.

=== 2nd ODI ===
20 October 2024
09:15
Scorecard

United States; 248 (49.4 overs)	v	Zimbabwe; 250/4 (48.3 overs)
Sindhu Sriharsha 69 (76); Nomvelo Sibanda 3/41 (9.4 overs)		Modester Mupachikwa 77 (113); Aditiba Chudasama 3/33(10 overs)

Zimbabwe won by 6 wickets
Harare Sports Club, Harare
Umpires: Iknow Chabi (Zim) and David Shawane (Zim)
Player of the match: Modester Mupachikwa (Zim)

- Zimbabwe won the toss and elected to field.

=== 3rd ODI ===
23 October 2024
09:15
Scorecard

Zimbabwe; 179 (48.4 overs)	v	United States; 182/6 (37.2 overs)
Modester Mupachikwa 34 (59); Geetika Kodali 5/43 (10 overs)		Anika Kolan 43 (59); Josephine Nkomo 2/32 (9 overs)

United States won by 4 wickets
Harare Sports Club, Harare
Umpires: Iknow Chabi (Zim) and Noelle Feremeka (Zim)
Player of the match: Geetika Kodali (USA)

- United States won the toss and elected to field.
- Olinder Chare (Zim) made her ODI debut.
- Geetika Kodali became the first cricketer for United States to take a five-wicket haul in women's ODIs.

=== 4th ODI ===
26 October 2024
09:15
Scorecard

Zimbabwe; 250/5 (50 overs)	v	United States; 100/3 (26.1 overs)
Ashley Ndiraya 82* (102); Tara Norris 3/55 (9 overs)		Ella Claridge 49* (45); Adel Zimunu 2/22 (4.1 overs)

Zimbabwe won by 18 runs (DLS method)
Harare Sports Club, Harare
Umpires: Christopher Phiri (Zim) and Oscar Tafirenyika (Zim)
Player of the match: Ashley Ndiraya (Zim)

- United States won the toss and elected to field.
- No further play was possible due to rain.
- Rain interrupted play with USA at 94/3 in 25 overs. USA were then set a revised target of 184 in 34 overs.
- Adel Zimunu (Zim) made her ODI debut.

=== 5th ODI ===
28 October 2024
09:15
Scorecard

Zimbabwe; 246/6 (50 overs)	v	United States; 249/3 (44.2 overs)
Chipo Mugeri-Tiripano 60 (68); Ritu Singh 2/37 (10 overs)		Chetna Pagydyala 136* (152); Olinder Chare 1/30 (5 overs); Loryn Phiri 1/30 (5 overs)

United States won by 7 wickets
Harare Sports Club, Harare
Umpires: Sarah Dambanevana (Zim) and Christopher Phiri (Zim)
Player of the match: Chetna Pagydyala (USA)

- United States won the toss and elected to field.
- Tendai Makusha (Zim) and Chetna Pagydyala (USA) both made their ODI debuts.
- Chetna Pagydyala became the first cricketer for United States to score a century in women's ODIs.
