= North East Warriors =

Women's cricket team in Northern England

Personnel
- Captain: Laura Ellison
- Coach: Tom Cant and Rachel Hopkins

Team information
- Founded: 2020
- Last match: 2024
- Home ground: Various

History
- T20 Cup wins: 0
- Official website: North East Warriors

North East Warriors was the women's representative cricket team for the English historic counties of County Durham and Northumberland. They played their home matches at grounds across the two counties, including Vigo Lane, Washington, County Durham and The Wicket, Hipsburn, Northumberland. They were captained by Laura Ellison.

The team was formed ahead of the 2020 season, with Durham and Northumberland deciding to merge at both youth and senior levels in order to provide a "united high performance pathway" for the region. Due to the COVID-19 pandemic, they did not take part in any formal competitions in 2020, only playing friendlies, but went on to compete in the Women's Twenty20 Cup from 2021 onwards and the ECB Women's County One-Day in 2024. They also contributed players to the North Representative XI, and were partnered with the regional team Northern Diamonds. They also played List A matches in the 2024 ECB Women's County One-Day championship, including a match against Yorkshire at the Riverside Ground.

With Durham Women turning professional, the Warriors played their last fixture against Derbyshire at Rockliffe Park in a T20 on 13 August 2024.

== Players ==
=== Current squad ===
Based on appearances in the 2023 season. ‡ denotes players with international caps.

Name	Nationality	Apps	Notes				
Name	Nationality	Apps	Notes	Laura Ellison	England	2	Club captain
Maddy Atkinson	England	2					
Ami Campbell	England	0	On loan to Worcestershire				
Hayley Falla	England	2	Wicket-keeper				
Libby Haward	England	2					
Rachel Hopkins	England	2					
Sterre Kalis ‡	Netherlands	0					
Jenny McDowell	England	2					
Harriet Robson	England	2					
Lizzie Scott	England	0					
Lilly-Mai Taylor	England	2					
Layla Tipton	England	2					
Emily Whiting	England	2					
Abbie Whybrow	England	2	Wicket-keeper; Dual-registration with Buckinghamshire				

== Seasons ==
=== Women's Twenty20 Cup ===
Season	Division	League standings								Notes
Season	Division	P	W	L	T	A/C	NRR	Pts	Pos	Notes
2021	North	8	1	5	0	2	–0.92	6	5th	
2022	Group 1	6	3	3	0	0	–0.52	12	5th	
2023	Group 1	6	0	0	0	6	+0.00	6	5th	
2024	Group 1	7	2	2	0	3	+0.38	37	6th	

=== ECB Women's County One-Day ===
Season	Group	League standings								Notes
Season	Group	P	W	L	T	A/C	BP	Pts	Pos	Notes
2024	Group 1	4	1	2	0	1	1	6	6th	

== See also ==
- Durham Women cricket team
- Northumberland Women cricket team
- North Representative XI
- Durham County Cricket Club
- Northumberland County Cricket Club
- Northern Diamonds
