= Audrey Collins =

English cricketer (1915–2010)

Audrey Collins OBE
Personal information
- Full name: Audrey Toll Collins
- Born: 14 April 1915; Mussoorie, United Provinces, British India
- Died: 14 February 2010 (aged 94); Shrewsbury, Shropshire, England
- Batting: Right-handed
- Bowling: Right-arm medium
- Role: All-rounder

International information
- National side: England (1937)
- Only Test (cap 20): 10 July 1937 v Australia

Domestic team information
- Years: Team
- 1937: Middlesex
- 1954: East Anglia

Career statistics
Competition	WTest	WFC
Matches	1	8
Runs scored	28	107
Batting average	28.00	11.88
100s/50s	0/0	0/0
Top score	27	27
Balls bowled	–	360
Wickets	–	3
Bowling average	–	64.66
5 wickets in innings	–	0
10 wickets in match	–	0
Best bowling	–	1/31
Catches/stumpings	0/–	1/–
- Source: CricketArchive, 10 March 2021

Audrey Toll Collins OBE (14 April 1915 – 14 February 2010) was an English cricketer who played as a right-handed batter and right-arm medium bowler. She appeared in one Test match England in 1937, against Australia. She played domestic cricket for various composite XIs, as well as Middlesex and East Anglia.

Born in India in 1915, she was brought to England by her Australian mother in 1920 after her father's death in World War I. She began her cricketing career at the age of 12, and went on to play one Test match, against Australia at The Oval. She scored 27 on her debut, putting on 54 in half an hour in partnership with Betty Archdale.

In 1983, she became chairman of the Women's Cricket Association, and served in the post until 1994. She was awarded an OBE for her services to the game and was one of the first ten female members of MCC. After her death the England team, on tour in India, wore black armbands during the second One Day International and both teams observed a minute's silence in her honour before the game.

There is now an Audrey Collins Cup awarded to girls' cricket teams in Hertfordshire.
