= Amu Surenkumar =

English cricketer

Personal information
- Full name: Amuruthaa Surenkumar
- Born: 24 October 2006 (age 20); Bournemouth, Dorset, England
- Batting: Right-handed
- Bowling: Right-arm medium
- Role: All-rounder

Domestic team information
- Years: Team
- 2022–2024: Middlesex
- 2023–2024: Sunrisers
- 2025–: Warwickshire

Career statistics
Competition	WLA	WT20
Matches	13	11
Runs scored	104	196
Batting average	17.33	24.50
100s/50s	0/0	0/0
Top score	25	44
Balls bowled	237	103
Wickets	6	3
Bowling average	36.50	36.33
5 wickets in innings	0	0
10 wickets in match	0	0
Best bowling	2/37	1/8
Catches/stumpings	1/–	0/–
- Source: CricketArchive, 19 October 2024

Amuruthaa Surenkumar (born 24 October 2006) is an English cricketer who currently plays for Warwickshire. She plays as a right-arm medium bowler and right-handed batter.

== Domestic career ==
Surenkumar made her county debut in 2022, for Middlesex against Huntingdonshire, scoring 11*. She played one further match that season, also against Huntingdonshire, scoring 17* and taking 1/8 from her 2 overs.

Surenkumar was named in the Sunrisers Academy squad between 2021 and 2023. She signed her first senior contract on 1 July 2023. She made her debut for the side on 2 July 2023, against Southern Vipers in the Rachael Heyhoe Flint Trophy, scoring 25 and taking 2/44 from 8.3 overs. She went on to play seven matches overall for the side that season, taking five wickets at an average of 29.40. In 2024, she played 11 matches for Sunrisers, across the Rachael Heyhoe Flint Trophy and the Charlotte Edwards Cup.
