= Buckinghamshire Women cricket team =

English county cricket team

Buckinghamshire Women

Personnel
- Captain: Cara Duggan

Team information
- Founded: Unknown First recorded match: 1936
- Home ground: Various Including Campbell Park Cricket Ground, Milton Keynes

History
- WCC wins: 0
- T20 Cup wins: 0
- Official website: Buckinghamshire Women Cricket

The Buckinghamshire Women's cricket team is the women's representative cricket team for the English historic county of Buckinghamshire. They play their home games across the county, and are captained by Izzy Gurney. They consistently played in the bottom tier of the Women's County Championship until the competition ended, and they now play only in the Women's Twenty20 Cup. They are partnered with the regional side Southern Vipers.

== History ==
=== 1936–2008: Early History ===
The first recorded match involving Buckinghamshire Women took place in 1936, in which they beat Berkshire Women by 66 runs. Over the following years, Buckinghamshire played various one-off matches against nearby sides, such as Surrey and Middlesex.

=== 2009– : Women's County Championship ===
Buckinghamshire Women joined the Women's Twenty20 Cup for its inaugural season in 2009, in which they finished 3rd in Division Eight, with one win. In 2010, Buckinghamshire Women joined the Women's County Championship, finishing bottom of Division 5 South & West. They fared better in the Twenty20 Cup, however, finishing second in their division before losing the Division Final to Wiltshire; in 2011 and 2012, Buckinghamshire again lost Division Finals, after topping the group in both years. In subsequent years, Buckinghamshire have been one of the poorer performers across the two competitions, although they did earn promotion in the Twenty20 Cup in 2014 before being relegated the following season. In 2019, the final season before a restructuring of women's county cricket, Buckinghamshire achieved one of their best seasons, finishing second in their division in both the County Championship and the Twenty20 Cup. In 2020, they competed in the East of England Championship, and won the T20 competition. In 2021, they competed in the East Group of the Twenty20 Cup, finishing second with 4 wins, as well as again competing in the East of England Championship, where they won the 45-over competition. The side withdrew from the East of England Championship in 2022, as well as finishing 3rd in their Twenty20 Cup group. They also joined the South Central Counties Cup in 2022, finishing fourth out of six teams in the inaugural edition. In 2023, the side finished bottom of their group in the Twenty20 Cup, and third in the South Central Counties Cup. In 2024, the side finished 9th in their group in the Twenty20 Cup and 7th in their group in the new ECB Women's County One-Day tournament.

== Players ==
=== Current squad ===
Based on appearances in the 2023 season.

Name	Nationality	2023 Appearances		Notes
Name	Nationality	WT20	SCCC	Notes
Cara Duggan	England	5	3	Club captain
Rosie Burton-Pye	England	5	1	
Molly Carter	England	3	3	
Ella Claridge ‡	United States	0	3	Wicket-keeper; dual-registration with Leicestershire
Hannah Critchley	England	0	4	
Hannah Davis	England	4	3	
Amber Drewe	England	1	3	
Rebecca Duggan	England	0	1	
Tilly Fellows	England	0	2	Wicket-keeper
Chloe Hill	England	0	1	Wicket-keeper; dual-registration with Worcestershire
Emily Hunt	England	0	1	
Isabella James	England	1	4	Dual-registration with Cambridgeshire
Georgia Lloyd	England	2	0	
Rosie Lloyd	England	2	5	
Pip Lloyd-Williams	England	2	0	
Natasha MacBean	England	5	5	
Charlie Mailey	England	3	2	
Amelia Peck	England	3	0	
Alissa Shannon	England	4	4	
Caia Stockdale	England	2	2	
Tegan Stockdale	England	4	3	
Maisie Taylor	England	1	1	
Annie Townsend	England	0	1	
Lucy Warren	England	3	0	
Abbie Whybrow	England	0	3	Wicket-keeper; dual-registration with North East Warriors
Holly Wilson	England	0	2	
Megan Woodward	England	5	3	

=== Notable players ===
Players who have played for Buckinghamshire and played internationally are listed below, in order of first international appearance (given in brackets):

- (England) Joy Partridge (1934)
- (England) Joan Hawes (1957)
- (England) Rosemary Goodchild (1966)
- (England) Janet Godman (1991)
- (Spain) Elspeth Fowler (2022)
- (United States) Ella Claridge (2024)

== Seasons ==
=== Women's County Championship ===
Season	Division	League standings								Notes
Season	Division	P	W	L	T	A/C	BP	Pts	Pos	Notes
2010	Division 5 S&W	6	0	6	0	0	10	10	4th	
2011	Division 5E	5	2	3	0	0	26	46	3rd	
2012	Division 4 N&E	4	2	0	0	2	14	34	2nd	
2013	Division 4 S&W	4	2	2	0	0	18	38	4th	
2014	Division 4 S&W	4	1	2	0	1	17	27	3rd	
2015	Division 4 S&W	5	0	4	0	1	18	18	6th	
2016	Division 4 S&W	4	1	2	0	1	12	22	5th	
2017	Division 3C	5	2	3	0	0	23	43	4th	
2018	Division 3C	6	3	3	0	0	28	58	3rd	
2019	Division 3C	5	4	1	0	0	30	70	2nd	

=== Women's Twenty20 Cup ===
Season	Division	League standings								Notes
Season	Division	P	W	L	T	A/C	NRR	Pts	Pos	Notes
2009	Division 8	3	1	2	0	0	−1.37	2	3rd	
2010	Division S&W 2	3	2	1	0	0	−0.51	4	2nd	Lost promotion play-off
2011	Division S&W 2	3	2	1	0	0	+2.98	4	1st	Lost promotion play-off
2012	Division S&W 2	3	3	0	0	0	+1.74	6	1st	Lost promotion play-off
2013	Division S&W 2	3	2	1	0	0	+0.30	4	2nd	
2014	Division 4A	4	4	0	0	0	+1.56	16	2nd	Promoted
2015	Division 3	8	0	8	0	0	−2.32	0	9th	Relegated
2016	Division 4B	6	2	2	0	2	−1.65	10	3rd	
2017	Division 3C	8	2	6	0	0	−1.60	8	5th	
2018	Division 3A	8	2	6	0	0	−1.37	8	5th	
2019	Division 3B	8	5	3	0	0	+0.17	20	2nd	
2021	East	8	4	2	0	2	+2.08	18	2nd	
2022	Group 7	6	1	5	0	0	–0.75	4	3rd	
2023	Group 5	6	0	4	0	2	–1.03	2	4th	
2024	Group 3	8	0	6	0	2	–3.05	16	9th	

=== ECB Women's County One-Day ===
Season	Group	League standings								Notes
Season	Group	P	W	L	T	A/C	BP	Pts	Pos	Notes
2024	Group 2	4	1	2	0	1	1	6	7th	

== See also ==
- Buckinghamshire County Cricket Club
- Southern Vipers
