= Huntingdonshire Women cricket team =

English women's cricket team

Huntingdonshire Women

Personnel
- Captain: Lottie Taylor
- Coach: Suraj Karavadra

Team information
- Founded: Unknown First recorded match: 1887
- Home ground: Cricketfield Lane, Ramsey

History
- T20 Cup wins: 0
- Official website: Huntingdonshire CCC

The Huntingdonshire Women's cricket team is the women's representative cricket team for the English historic county of Huntingdonshire. They play their home games at Cricketfield Lane in Ramsey, and are captained by Lottie Taylor. In the Women's County Championship, Huntingdonshire played as a combined team with Cambridgeshire, as Cambridgeshire and Huntingdonshire Women, but the two counties played separately in the 2014 Women's Twenty20 Cup, and Cambridgeshire have competed individually in the Twenty20 tournament since. In 2021, Huntingdonshire re-joined the Women's Twenty20 Cup, after playing in the East of England Championship in 2020. They are partnered with the regional side Sunrisers.

== History ==
Huntingdonshire played their first recorded match in 1887, against Bedfordshire. In 2009, Huntingdonshire joined the Women's Twenty20 Cup and in 2010 joined the Women's County Championship, as Cambridgeshire and Huntingdonshire Women. In 2014, however, in the Twenty20 Cup only, the two sides split and competed individually. Huntingdonshire finished bottom of Division Four in the 2014 Women's Twenty20 Cup. After this, they did not compete in any national competitions until 2021, when they competed in the 2021 Women's Twenty20 Cup, in the East Group, finishing 5th. They finished bottom of their group in the 2022 Women's Twenty20 Cup, but did win one match, against Buckinghamshire. They again won one match in the 2023 Women's Twenty20 Cup. They have also competed in the regional East of England Championship since 2020, with their best finish coming in their first season, when they finished third in the 45-over competition. In 2024, the side finished 9th in their group in the Twenty20 Cup and 10th in their group in the new ECB Women's County One-Day tournament.

== Players ==
=== Current squad ===
Based on appearances in the 2023 season. ‡ denotes players with international caps.

Name	Nationality	2023 Appearances		Notes
Name	Nationality	WT20	EoE	Notes
Lottie Taylor	England	4	3	Club captain
Annabel Anslow	England	0	2	
Charlotte Aylmore	England	2	0	
Annie Banks	England	4	3	
Emily Banks	England	1	3	
Ella Briault	England	1	0	
Abigail Butcher	England	2	0	Wicket-keeper
Emily Carpenter	England	4	3	
Holly Chambers	England	4	2	
Yasmin Daswani ‡	Hong Kong	0	3	Dual-registration with Essex
Ava Kemp	England	4	3	
Sophie Lawrence	England	4	1	
Laura Newton	England	3	3	
Ellen Oakins	England	0	2	
Maddie Redpath	England	1	0	
Jessica Taylor	England	0	2	
Faith Teekasingh	England	4	3	
Annabelle Woodward	England	2	3	

=== Notable players ===
Players who have played for Huntingdonshire and played internationally are listed below, in order of first international appearance (given in brackets):

- (Hong Kong) Yasmin Daswani (2019)

== Seasons ==
=== Women's Twenty20 Cup ===
Season	Division	League standings								Notes
Season	Division	P	W	L	T	A/C	NRR	Pts	Pos	Notes
2014	Division 4B	3	0	3	0	0	−1.58	0	13th	
2021	East	8	0	5	0	3	−3.40	3	5th	
2022	Group 7	6	1	5	0	0	−5.45	4	4th	
2023	Group 4	6	1	3	0	2	−1.16	6	4th	
2024	Group 2	8	0	7	1	0	–2.28	10	9th	

=== ECB Women's County One-Day ===
Season	Group	League standings								Notes
Season	Group	P	W	L	T	A/C	BP	Pts	Pos	Notes
2024	Group 2	4	0	4	0	0	0	0	10th	

== See also ==
- Huntingdonshire County Cricket Club
- Cambridgeshire and Huntingdonshire Women cricket team
- Cambridgeshire Women cricket team
- Sunrisers (women's cricket)
