= Women's London Cup =

English women's cricket competition

- Countries: England
- Format: Twenty20
- Tournament format: One-off
- Number of teams: 2
- Current champion: Surrey
- Most successful: Middlesex (6 titles)

The Women's London Cup (previously the Pemberton Greenish Cup) is an English cricket competition played as a one-off Twenty20 match between Middlesex and Surrey each year since 2015. It was conceived by Surrey's Director of Women's Cricket Ebony Rainford-Brent. Middlesex won the first five editions, before Surrey won at the sixth time of asking in 2020. Middlesex won back the title in 2021, before Surrey claimed their second title in 2022, winning by nine wickets at The Oval. The 2023 edition was abandoned due to rain. Surrey again won the title in 2024.

== Results ==
Season	Venue	Winner	Result	Runner-up	Ref.
2015	The Oval, London	Middlesex	Won by 25 runs	Surrey	
2016	The Oval, London	Middlesex	Won by 35 runs	Surrey	
2017	Brunton Memorial Ground, Radlett	Middlesex	Won by 3 runs	Surrey	
2018	Woodbridge Road, Guildford	Middlesex	Won by 7 wickets	Surrey	
2019	Lord's, London	Middlesex	Won by 6 wickets (DLS)	Surrey	
2020	The Oval, London	Surrey	Won by 4 wickets	Middlesex	
2021	Brunton Memorial Ground, Radlett	Middlesex	Won by 8 wickets	Surrey	
2022	The Oval, London	Surrey	Won by 9 wickets	Middlesex	
2023	Lord's, London	–	Match Abandoned (Note: The original match was abandoned due to rain on 14 July 2023. The match was rescheduled to take place at Hornsey Cricket Club on 8 September 2023, but was cancelled due to "scheduling and logistical challenges".)	–	
2024	The Oval, London	Surrey	Won by 6 wickets	Middlesex	
