= South Central Counties Cup =

English women's cricket competition

- Countries: England
- Administrator: Southern Vipers
- Format: Limited overs cricket (50 overs per side)
- First edition: 2022
- Latest edition: 2023
- Tournament format: League system
- Number of teams: 6
- Current champion: Sussex (1st title)
- Most successful: Hampshire (1 title); Sussex (1 title)
- Website: South Central Regional Cup

The South Central Counties Cup is a domestic women's one-day cricket competition in England. Organised by the Southern Vipers regional team for the six counties that constitute the team's region in the South of England, its first edition took place in 2022. The six teams that participate in the competition are Berkshire, Buckinghamshire, Dorset, Hampshire, Oxfordshire and Sussex.

Following the end of the Women's County Championship in 2019 and the launch of the new regional structure for domestic women's cricket in England in 2020, county sides were left without any 50-over cricket. Following the launch of similar competitions such as the East of England Women's County Championship and the Women's London Championship, the South Central Counties Cup aims to provide "meaningful" 50-over cricket to the county teams in the region.

The inaugural 2022 edition of the competition took place from 30 May to 11 August, with each team playing each other once. Hampshire won the inaugural competition, winning four of their five matches (with the other abandoned). The second edition of the tournament, in 2023, was won by Sussex on head-to-head record over second-placed Hampshire, after the teams finished on the same number of points and with the same net run rate (to two decimal places).
