= Cambridgeshire Women cricket team =

English county cricket team

Cambridgeshire Women

Personnel
- Captain: Lara Neild

Team information
- Founded: Unknown First recorded match: 1961
- Home ground: Various Including Bluntisham Recreation Ground, Bluntisham

History
- T20 Cup wins: 0
- Official website: Cambridgeshire Cricket

The Cambridgeshire Women's cricket team is the women's representative cricket team for the English historic county of Cambridgeshire. They play their home games across the county, and are captained by Lara Neild. In the Women's County Championship, Cambridgeshire played as a combined team with Huntingdonshire, as Cambridgeshire and Huntingdonshire Women, but since 2014 they have played individually in the Women's Twenty20 Cup, in which they have consistently competed in the lowest tier. They are partnered with the regional side Sunrisers.

== History ==
=== 1961-2013: Early History ===
Cambridgeshire Women played their first recorded game in 1961, against Middlesex Women Second XI. After this, they played in various one-off games and regional tournaments, before they joined the Women's County Championship in 2010 as Cambridgeshire and Huntingdonshire Women, under which they played until 2019, the final season of the tournament.

=== 2014- : Women's Twenty20 Cup ===
From the inaugural season of the Women's Twenty20 Cup in 2009 until 2013, Cambridgeshire also competed as Cambridgeshire and Huntingdonshire. However, in 2014, the two counties split and competed separately. Cambridgeshire finished 8th in Division Four, winning two games, including a victory over Huntingdonshire. After this, Cambridgeshire have always played in the bottom tier of the Twenty20 Cup, achieving their most successful season in 2019, with three wins. In 2021, they competed in the East Group of the Twenty20 Cup, finishing 4th with 4 victories. They also joined the East of England Championship in 2021, and finished 4th out of 6 teams in their first season. The side withdrew from the East of England Championship in 2022, as well as finishing 3rd in their Twenty20 Cup group. In the 2023 Women's Twenty20 Cup, the side finished top of their group, but the group finals day was abandoned due to rain. In 2024, the side finished 7th in their group in the Twenty20 Cup and 6th in their group in the new ECB Women's County One-Day tournament.

== Players ==
=== Current squad ===
Based on appearances in the 2022 season.

Name	Nationality	Apps	Notes				
Name	Nationality	Apps	Notes	Lara Neild	England	4	Club captain
May Busher	England	4					
Becky Case-Upton	England	2					
Jessica Clilverd	England	2					
Alice Cross	England	2					
Lara Foulkes	England	1					
Sarisha Gorantla	England	2					
Kelly Haynes	England	3	Wicket-keeper				
Isabella James	England	5	Dual-registration with Buckinghamshire				
Anabel Kaser	England	2					
Jessica Olorenshaw	England	1	Dual-registration with Essex				
Sophia Pearson	England	2					
Sally Phelps	England	1					
Connie Piper	England	5					
Beatrice Routledge	England	3					
A Sureakumar	England	1					
Jemaira Vestey	England	5					
Madeline Welham	England	2					
Olivia Welham	England	4					
Jasmine Westley	England	5	Dual-registration with Essex				
Biz Whichello	England	2					

=== Notable players ===
Players who have played for Cambridgeshire and played internationally are listed below, in order of first international appearance (given in brackets):

- (Spain) Elspeth Fowler (2022)

== Seasons ==
=== Women's Twenty20 Cup ===
Season	Division	League standings								Notes
Season	Division	P	W	L	T	A/C	NRR	Pts	Pos	Notes
2014	Division 4B	3	2	1	0	0	+0.63	8	8th	
2015	Division 4A	4	0	4	0	0	−0.72	0	4th	
2016	Division 4A	6	0	6	0	0	−1.77	0	3rd	
2017	Division 3C	8	1	7	0	0	−2.02	4	6th	
2018	Division 3C	8	0	8	0	0	−2.60	0	6th	
2019	Division 3B	8	3	5	0	0	−0.98	12	6th	
2021	East	8	4	2	0	2	−0.07	18	4th	
2022	Group 4	6	2	4	0	0	−2.56	8	3rd	
2023	Group 4	6	3	2	0	1	+1.05	13	1st	
2024	Group 2	8	2	6	0	0	–1.81	46	7th	

=== ECB Women's County One-Day ===
Season	Group	League standings								Notes
Season	Group	P	W	L	T	A/C	BP	Pts	Pos	Notes
2024	Group 2	4	2	1	0	1	1	10	6th	

== See also ==
- Cambridgeshire County Cricket Club
- Cambridgeshire and Huntingdonshire Women cricket team
- Huntingdonshire Women cricket team
- Sunrisers (women's cricket)
