= 2010 Women's County Championship =

- Administrator(s): England and Wales Cricket Board
- Cricket format: 50 over
- Tournament format(s): League system
- Champions: Sussex (5th title)
- Participants: 37
- Most runs: Lydia Greenway (628)
- Most wickets: Danni Wyatt (24)

The 2010 Women's County One-Day Championship was the 14th cricket Women's County Championship season. It ran from May to September and saw 33 county teams and teams representing Ireland, Scotland, Wales and the Netherlands compete in a series of divisions. Sussex Women won the County Championship as winners of the top division, their fifth title.

== Competition format ==
Teams played matches within a series of divisions with the winners of the top division being crowned County Champions. Matches were played using a one day format with 50 overs per side.

The championship worked on a points system, with placings decided by average points of completed games. The points are awarded as follows:

Win: 10 points + bonus points.
Tie: 5 points + bonus points.
Loss: Bonus points.
Abandoned or cancelled: Match not counted to average.

Bonus points are awarded for various batting and bowling milestones. The bonus points for each match are retained if the match is completed.

- Batting

1.50 runs per over (RPO) or more: 1 point
2 RPO or more: 2 points
3 RPO or more: 3 points
4 RPO or more: 4 points

- Bowling

3-4 wickets taken: 1 point
5-6 wickets taken: 2 points
7-8 wickets taken: 3 points
9-10 wickets taken: 4 points

== Teams ==
The 2010 Championship was divided into five divisions: Divisions One to Four with six teams apiece and Division Five with 13 teams split across three regional groups.

Teams in each group played each other twice.

Division One	Berkshire	Kent	Nottinghamshire	Somerset	Sussex	Yorkshire
Division Two	Cheshire	Essex	Middlesex	Surrey	Warwickshire	Worcestershire
Division Three	Devon	Hampshire	Lancashire	Scotland	Staffordshire	Wales
Division Four	Cornwall	Derbyshire	Durham	Hertfordshire	Netherlands	Northamptonshire
Division Five East	Cambridgeshire and Huntingdonshire	Oxfordshire	Norfolk	Suffolk		
Division Five North	Cumbria	Ireland	Leicestershire and Rutland	Northumberland	Shropshire	
Division Five South & West	Buckinghamshire	Dorset	Gloucestershire	Wiltshire		

== Division One ==
Team	Pld	W	L	T	A	Bat	Bowl	Ded	Pts	Avg.
Sussex (C)	10	8	2	0	0	21	39	0	140	14.00
Kent	10	7	3	0	0	29	33	0	132	13.20
Berkshire	10	6	4	0	0	22	27	0	109	10.90
Yorkshire	10	5	5	0	0	24	29	0	103	10.30
Nottinghamshire	10	2	8	0	0	17	25	0	62	6.20
Somerset (R)	10	2	8	0	0	20	20	0	60	6.00

Source: ECB Women's County Championship

== Division Two ==
Team	Pld	W	L	T	A	Bat	Bowl	Ded	Pts	Avg.
Middlesex (P)	10	8	2	0	0	29	35	0	144	14.40
Essex	10	8	2	0	0	29	34	0	143	14.30
Warwickshire	10	6	4	0	0	23	33	0	116	11.60
Surrey	10	5	4	0	1	18	28	0	96	10.67
Cheshire	10	2	7	0	1	18	26	0	64	7.11
Worcestershire (R)	10	0	10	0	0	8	27	0	35	3.50

Source: ECB Women's County Championship

== Division Three ==
Team	Pld	W	L	T	A	Bat	Bowl	Ded	Pts	Avg.
Wales (P)	10	8	2	0	0	21	32	0	133	13.30
Staffordshire	10	6	3	0	1	23	35	0	118	13.11
Lancashire	10	6	3	0	1	18	35	0	113	12.56
Devon	10	7	3	0	0	23	32	0	125	12.50
Scotland	10	2	8	0	0	11	23	0	54	5.40
Hampshire (R)	10	0	10	0	0	16	22	0	38	3.80

Source: ECB Women's County Championship

== Division Four ==
Team	Pld	W	L	T	A	Bat	Bowl	Ded	Pts	Avg.
Netherlands (P)	5	4	1	0	0	14	19	0	73	14.60
Derbyshire	9	6	3	0	0	21	33	0	114	12.67
Northamptonshire	9	5	4	0	0	17	30	0	97	10.78
Hertfordshire	9	4	3	0	2	13	22	0	75	10.71
Durham	9	4	4	0	1	16	23	0	79	9.88
Cornwall (R)	9	0	8	0	1	7	13	0	20	2.50

Source: ECB Women's County Championship

== Division Five ==
=== East ===
Team	Pld	W	L	T	A	Bat	Bowl	Ded	Pts	Avg.
Cambridgeshire and Huntingdonshire (Note: Cambridgeshire and Huntingdonshire were promoted by virtue of being the best Division Five group winner, on average points.) (P)	6	5	0	0	1	13	20	0	83	16.60
Norfolk	6	3	2	0	1	6	18	0	54	10.80
Oxfordshire	6	2	4	0	0	8	19	0	47	7.83
Suffolk	6	1	5	0	0	4	16	0	30	5.00

Source: ECB Women's County Championship

=== North ===
Team	Pld	W	L	T	A	Bat	Bowl	Ded	Pts	Avg.
Leicestershire and Rutland	7	6	1	0	0	23	27	0	110	15.71
Ireland	4	3	1	0	0	14	15	0	59	14.75
Cumbria	7	3	4	0	0	9	22	0	61	8.71
Shropshire	7	3	4	0	0	11	19	0	60	8.57
Northumberland	7	1	6	0	0	7	6	0	23	3.29

Source: ECB Women's County Championship

=== South & West ===
Team	Pld	W	L	T	A	Bat	Bowl	Ded	Pts	Avg.
Gloucestershire	6	5	1	0	0	17	20	0	87	14.50
Wiltshire	6	4	2	0	0	15	22	0	77	12.83
Dorset	6	3	3	0	0	13	19	0	62	10.33
Buckinghamshire	6	0	6	0	0	4	6	0	10	1.67

Source: ECB Women's County Championship

== Statistics ==
=== Most runs ===
Player	Team	Matches	Innings	Runs	Average	HS	100s	50s
Lydia Greenway	Kent	10	10	628	78.50	112*	1	6
Charlotte Edwards	Kent	10	10	562	70.25	126*	1	5
Jenny Dunn	Middlesex	9	9	483	60.37	158*	1	2
Rachel Priest	Staffordshire	8	8	475	67.85	178*	2	2
Aimee Watkins	Devon	8	8	472	67.42	188	1	2

Source: CricketArchive

=== Most wickets ===
Player	Team	Balls	Wickets	Average	BBI	5w
Danni Wyatt	Staffordshire	510	24	9.33	7/41	1
Katherine Brunt	Yorkshire	497	22	12.36	6/29	2
Holly Colvin	Sussex	499	21	7.76	7/3	1
Jennifer Laycock	Lancashire	509	21	9.66	5/9	1
Isa Guha	Berkshire	550	21	13.85	4/14	0

Source: CricketArchive
