= 2014 Women's Twenty20 Cup =

- Administrator(s): England and Wales Cricket Board
- Cricket format: Twenty20
- Tournament format(s): League system
- Champions: Nottinghamshire (1st title)
- Participants: 40
- Most runs: Clare Shillington (242)
- Most wickets: Erin Bermingham (15)

The 2014 Women's Twenty20 Cup, known for sponsorship reasons as the 2014 NatWest Women's Twenty20 Cup, was the 6th cricket Women's Twenty20 Cup tournament. It took place in July and August, with 40 teams taking part: 36 county teams, alongside Scotland, Ireland, Wales and Netherlands. Nottinghamshire Women won the Twenty20 Cup, achieving their first title. The tournament ran alongside the 50-over 2014 Women's County Championship.

== Competition format ==
Teams played matches within a series of divisions, across two rounds of groupings. Matches were played using a Twenty20 format.

The championship worked on a points system with positions within the divisions being based on the total points. Points were awarded as follows:

Win: 4 points.
Tie: 2 points.
Loss: 0 points.
Abandoned/Cancelled: 1 point.

== Teams ==
The 2014 Women's Twenty20 Cup was divided into four divisions: Divisions One, Two and Three with nine teams each and Division Four with 13 teams. Each Division was divided into regional groups of 3 teams apiece, with each team playing each other twice (apart from Division 4B, which had four teams, and each team played each other once).

Based on placings in the first round, teams then progressed to tiered divisions in round two (or tiered matches, in Division Four): for example, the winner of Group 1A progressed to Round 2 Group 1A, with the runners-up being placed in Round 2 Group 1B and third place moving to Round 2 Group 1C. The winners of Round 2 Group 1A were crowned champions, and placings further down determined promotion and relegation. The teams were initially divided into groups as follows:

Division 1A	Berkshire	Middlesex	Sussex	
Division 1B	Essex	Kent	Surrey	
Division 1C	Nottinghamshire	Warwickshire	Yorkshire	
Division 2A	Cheshire	Staffordshire	Worcestershire	
Division 2B	Durham	Ireland	Lancashire	
Division 2C	Devon	Somerset	Wales	
Division 3A	Gloucestershire	Hampshire	Oxfordshire	
Division 3B	Hertfordshire	Netherlands	Northamptonshire	
Division 3C	Derbyshire	Leicestershire and Rutland	Scotland	
Division 4A	Buckinghamshire	Shropshire	Suffolk	
Division 4B	Bedfordshire	Cambridgeshire	Huntingdonshire	Norfolk
Division 4C	Cumbria	Lincolnshire	Northumberland	
Division 4D	Cornwall	Dorset	Wiltshire	

== Division One ==
=== Round 1 ===
==== Group A ====
Team	Pld	W	L	T	A	C	NRR	Ded	Pts
Middlesex	4	3	1	0	0	0	+0.31	0	12
Sussex	4	3	1	0	0	0	+0.20	0	12
Berkshire	4	0	4	0	0	0	–0.53	0	0

Source: ECB Women's Twenty20 Cup

==== Group B ====
Team	Pld	W	L	T	A	C	NRR	Ded	Pts
Kent	4	3	1	0	0	0	+2.28	0	12
Surrey	4	3	1	0	0	0	+0.78	0	12
Essex	4	0	4	0	0	0	–3.44	0	0

Source: ECB Women's Twenty20 Cup

==== Group C ====
Team	Pld	W	L	T	A	C	NRR	Ded	Pts
Nottinghamshire	4	4	0	0	0	0	+0.92	0	16
Yorkshire	4	2	2	0	0	0	+0.94	0	8
Warwickshire	4	0	4	0	0	0	–1.85	0	0

Source: ECB Women's Twenty20 Cup

=== Round 2 ===
==== Group A ====
Team	Pld	W	L	T	A	C	NRR	Ded	Pts
Nottinghamshire (C)	2	1	1	0	0	0	+1.83	0	4
Middlesex	2	1	1	0	0	0	–0.75	0	4
Kent	2	1	1	0	0	0	–1.08	0	4

Source: ECB Women's Twenty20 Cup

==== Group B ====
Team	Pld	W	L	T	A	C	NRR	Ded	Pts
Yorkshire	2	2	0	0	0	0	+0.38	0	8
Sussex	2	1	1	0	0	0	+0.27	0	4
Surrey	2	0	2	0	0	0	–0.67	0	0

Source: ECB Women's Twenty20 Cup

==== Group C ====
Team	Pld	W	L	T	A	C	NRR	Ded	Pts
Berkshire	2	2	0	0	0	0	+3.06	0	8
Warwickshire (R)	2	1	1	0	0	0	+0.56	0	4
Essex (R)	2	0	2	0	0	0	–3.94	0	0

Source: ECB Women's Twenty20 Cup

== Division Two ==
=== Round 1 ===
==== Group A ====
Team	Pld	W	L	T	A	C	NRR	Ded	Pts
Staffordshire	4	3	1	0	0	0	+1.60	0	12
Cheshire	4	2	2	0	0	0	+0.20	0	8
Worcestershire	4	1	3	0	0	0	–1.81	0	4

Source: ECB Women's Twenty20 Cup

==== Group B ====
Team	Pld	W	L	T	A	C	NRR	Ded	Pts
Ireland	4	3	1	0	0	0	+2.07	0	12
Lancashire	4	2	2	0	0	0	+0.32	0	8
Durham	4	1	3	0	0	0	–2.99	0	4

Source: ECB Women's Twenty20 Cup

==== Group C ====
Team	Pld	W	L	T	A	C	NRR	Ded	Pts
Somerset	4	3	1	0	0	0	+2.50	0	12
Wales	4	2	2	0	0	0	–1.14	0	8
Devon	4	1	3	0	0	0	–1.36	0	4

Source: ECB Women's Twenty20 Cup

=== Round 2 ===
==== Group A ====
Team	Pld	W	L	T	A	C	NRR	Ded	Pts
Ireland (P)	2	2	0	0	0	0	+2.25	0	8
Somerset (P)	2	1	1	0	0	0	–1.75	0	4
Staffordshire	2	0	2	0	0	0	–0.45	0	0

Source: ECB Women's Twenty20 Cup

==== Group B ====
Team	Pld	W	L	T	A	C	NRR	Ded	Pts
Lancashire	2	2	0	0	0	0	+1.50	0	8
Wales	2	1	1	0	0	0	+0.05	0	4
Cheshire	2	0	2	0	0	0	–1.55	0	0

Source: ECB Women's Twenty20 Cup

==== Group C ====
Team	Pld	W	L	T	A	C	NRR	Ded	Pts
Durham	2	2	0	0	0	0	+3.06	0	8
Devon (R)	2	1	1	0	0	0	+0.56	0	4
Worcestershire (R)	2	0	2	0	0	0	–3.94	0	0

Source: ECB Women's Twenty20 Cup

== Division Three ==
=== Round 1 ===
==== Group A ====
Team	Pld	W	L	T	A	C	NRR	Ded	Pts
Hampshire	4	4	0	0	0	0	+1.61	0	16
Gloucestershire	4	2	2	0	0	0	+0.16	0	8
Oxfordshire	4	0	4	0	0	0	–1.72	0	0

Source: ECB Women's Twenty20 Cup

==== Group B ====
Team	Pld	W	L	T	A	C	NRR	Ded	Pts
Netherlands	4	4	0	0	0	0	+2.86	0	16
Northamptonshire	4	2	2	0	0	0	–0.88	0	8
Hertfordshire	4	0	4	0	0	0	–0.78	0	0

Source: ECB Women's Twenty20 Cup

==== Group C ====
Team	Pld	W	L	T	A	C	NRR	Ded	Pts
Derbyshire	4	3	1	0	0	0	+0.56	0	12
Scotland	4	3	1	0	0	0	+0.26	0	12
Leicestershire and Rutland	4	0	4	0	0	0	–0.78	0	0

Source: ECB Women's Twenty20 Cup

=== Round 2 ===
==== Group A ====
Team	Pld	W	L	T	A	C	NRR	Ded	Pts
Derbyshire (P)	2	1	1	0	0	0	+1.72	0	4
Netherlands (P)	2	1	1	0	0	0	–0.15	0	4
Hampshire	2	1	1	0	0	0	–1.11	0	4

Source: ECB Women's Twenty20 Cup

==== Group B ====
Team	Pld	W	L	T	A	C	NRR	Ded	Pts
Scotland	2	2	0	0	0	0	+1.47	0	8
Northamptonshire	2	1	1	0	0	0	+0.61	0	4
Gloucestershire	2	0	2	0	0	0	–2.09	0	0

Source: ECB Women's Twenty20 Cup

==== Group C ====
Team	Pld	W	L	T	A	C	NRR	Ded	Pts
Oxfordshire	1	1	0	0	0	0	+0.20	0	4
Leicestershire and Rutland (R)	1	0	1	0	0	0	–0.20	0	0
Hertfordshire (Note: Withdrew from group) (R)	0	0	0	0	0	0	–	0	0

Source: ECB Women's Twenty20 Cup

== Division Four ==
=== Round 1 ===
==== Group A ====
Team	Pld	W	L	T	A	C	NRR	Ded	Pts
Buckinghamshire	4	4	0	0	0	0	+1.56	0	16
Suffolk	4	2	2	0	0	0	−0.39	0	8
Shropshire	4	0	4	0	0	0	–1.19	0	0

Source: ECB Women's Twenty20 Cup

==== Group B ====
Team	Pld	W	L	T	A	C	NRR	Ded	Pts
Norfolk	3	3	0	0	0	0	+1.27	0	12
Cambridgeshire	3	2	1	0	0	0	+0.63	0	8
Bedfordshire	3	1	2	0	0	0	–0.39	0	4
Huntingdonshire	3	0	3	0	0	0	–1.58	0	0

Source: ECB Women's Twenty20 Cup

==== Group C ====
Team	Pld	W	L	T	A	C	NRR	Ded	Pts
Cumbria	4	4	0	0	0	0	+2.50	0	16
Northumberland	4	1	3	0	0	0	−0.54	0	4
Lincolnshire	4	1	3	0	0	0	−1.82	0	4

Source: ECB Women's Twenty20 Cup

==== Group D ====
Team	Pld	W	L	T	A	C	NRR	Ded	Pts
Cornwall	4	4	0	0	0	0	+2.51	0	16
Dorset	4	2	2	0	0	0	−0.85	0	8
Wiltshire	4	0	4	0	0	0	–1.74	0	0

Source: ECB Women's Twenty20 Cup

=== Round 2 ===
The teams in Division Four then played in a series of placing matches, to determine finishing positions from 1st to 13th, with the top two being promoted. The teams placed as follows:

Position	Team(s)
1st	Cornwall (P)
2nd	Buckinghamshire (P)
3rd=	Cumbria
3rd=	Norfolk
5th	Suffolk
6th	Dorset
7th	Northumberland
8th	Cambridgeshire
9th	Shropshire
10th	Lincolnshire
11th	Bedfordshire
12th	Wiltshire
13th	Huntingdonshire

== Statistics ==
=== Most runs ===
Player	Team	Matches	Innings	Runs	Average	HS	100s	50s
Clare Shillington	Ireland	6	6	242	48.40	113*	1	0
Heather Knight	Berkshire	5	5	205	51.25	92	0	2
Dawn Prestidge	Cheshire	6	6	204	51.00	87*	0	2
Nat Sciver	Surrey	4	4	202	50.50	77	0	3
Alex MacDonald	Yorkshire	6	6	193	48.25	71*	0	1

Source: CricketArchive

=== Most wickets ===
Player	Team	Balls	Wickets	Average	BBI	5w
Erin Bermingham	Kent	144	15	7.60	4/7	0
Nicole Richards	Cornwall	124	13	4.15	4/12	0
Sarah Sundaram	Derbyshire	129	13	8.69	3/6	0
Carrie Ellwood	Cumbria	115	11	6.00	3/8	0
Martha Manktelow	Buckinghamshire	138	11	7.90	3/8	0

Source: CricketArchive
