= Lincolnshire Women cricket team =

English county cricket team

Lincolnshire Women

Personnel
- Captain: Lauren Tuffrey
- Coach: Gary Lambert

Team information
- Founded: Unknown First recorded match: 1948
- Home ground: Various

History
- WCC wins: 0
- T20 Cup wins: 0
- Official website: Lincolnshire Women

The Lincolnshire Women's cricket team is the women's representative cricket team for the English historic county of Lincolnshire. They play their home matches at various grounds across the county, and are captained by Alicia Shaw. After joining the Women's County Championship in 2015, they competed in Division Three in the final season of the tournament in 2019. They have since competed in the Women's Twenty20 Cup. They are partnered with the East Midlands regional team, The Blaze.

== History ==
Lincolnshire Women's Cricket Association was formed in February 1947. Their representative team was due to play its first match against a Nottinghamshire XI at Belton Park on 14 June 1947 but the game was cancelled due to adverse weather. In 1948 Lincolnshire played two inter-county matches, beating Yorkshire Second XI at Kesteven and Grantham Girls' School on 3 July, and losing to Nottinghamshire Second XI at Belton Park on 17 July.

Before joining the nationwide county structure in 2014, Lincolnshire Women had only competed in friendlies and regional competitions. In 2014, they competed in the Women's Twenty20 Cup, winning one of their four games in Division 4, against Northumberland Women. In 2015, they joined the Women's County Championship as well, finishing bottom of Division 4 North & East with one win. Since then, Lincolnshire remained in the bottom tier of both competitions, achieving their best season in 2018, finishing second in their division in both the County Championship and the T20 competition. In 2021, they competed in the East Midlands Group of the Twenty20 Cup, finishing 2nd with 3 wins. They also joined the East of England Championship in 2021, and finished 3rd out of 6 teams in their first season. They finished bottom of their group in the 2022 Women's Twenty20 Cup, and bottom of the group in the 2022 East of England Championship. In the 2023 Women's Twenty20 Cup, the side finished second in their group, but the group finals day was abandoned due to rain. In 2024, the side finished 8th in their group in the Twenty20 Cup and 9th in their group in the new ECB Women's County One-Day tournament.

== Players ==
=== Current squad ===
Based on appearances in the 2025 season.

Name	Nationality	2025 Appearances		Notes
Name	Nationality	Metro Bank One Day Cup	Vitality Blast	Notes
Abigail Hannan	England	4	11	
Hester Dakin	England	3	9	
Alicia Shaw	England	3	11	
Lauren Tuffrey	England	3	9	
Jess Thatcher	England	4	11	
Eloise Hall	England	4	9	
Sophie Smith	England	4	11	Wicket-keeper
Molly Rebanks	England	3	8	
Emmeline Hannan	England	1	0	
Holly Vaughan	England	4	8	
Tess Buchanan	England	1	1	
Martha Cunningham	England	2	2	
Hannah Hughes	England	2	9	
Jodie Cook	England	1	11	
Kate Williams	England	2	4	
Anneka Watson	England	2	11	
Aqsa Akhtar			4	
Rebecca Brooker		1		loan from Leicestershire
Natasha Allen		1		loan from Derbyshire
Jasmine Thomas		1		
Harriet Parkin		1		loan from Derbyshire

=== Notable players ===
Players who have played for Lincolnshire and played internationally are listed below, in order of first international appearance (given in brackets):

- (Scotland) Kathryn Bryce (2018)

== Seasons ==
=== Women's County Championship ===
Season	Division	League standings								Notes
Season	Division	P	W	L	T	A/C	BP	Pts	Pos	Notes
2015	Division 4 N&E	4	1	3	0	0	19	29	5th	
2016	Division 4 N&E	5	2	2	0	1	21	41	4th	
2017	Division 3D	4	2	2	0	0	21	41	4th	
2018	Division 3D	6	4	2	0	0	40	80	2nd	
2019	Division 3A	6	2	4	0	0	31	51	4th	

=== Women's Twenty20 Cup ===
Season	Division	League standings								Notes
Season	Division	P	W	L	T	A/C	NRR	Pts	Pos	Notes
2014	Division 4C	4	1	3	0	0	–1.82	4	10th	
2015	Division 4C	6	1	2	0	3	–0.70	7	5th	
2016	Division 4C	6	1	5	0	0	–1.72	4	4th	
2017	Division 3B	8	3	5	0	0	–1.42	12	5th	
2018	Division 3C	8	6	2	0	0	+1.66	24	2nd	
2019	Division 3B	8	3	5	0	0	–0.98	12	5th	
2021	East Midlands	8	3	1	0	4	+1.81	16	2nd	
2022	Group 5	6	0	6	0	0	–1.15	0	4th	
2023	Group 4	6	2	2	0	2	–0.41	0	2nd	
2024	Group 2	8	1	5	0	2	–3.30	35	8th	

=== ECB Women's County One-Day ===
Season	Group	League standings								Notes
Season	Group	P	W	L	T	A/C	BP	Pts	Pos	Notes
2024	Group 2	4	0	3	0	1	0	1	9th	

== See also ==
- Lincolnshire County Cricket Club
- The Blaze (women's cricket)
