= Cambridgeshire and Huntingdonshire Women cricket team =

English county cricket team

Cambridgeshire and Huntingdonshire Women
Team information
- Founded: Unknown First recorded match: 2009
- Dissolved: 2019
- Home ground: Various Including Bluntisham Recreation Ground, Bluntisham

History
- WCC wins: 0
- T20 Cup wins: 0

The Cambridgeshire and Huntingdonshire Women's cricket team was the women's representative cricket team for the English historic counties of Cambridgeshire and Huntingdonshire. They played their home games at various grounds across the counties. They competed in the Women's County Championship between 2010 and 2019, and competed in the Women's Twenty20 Cup between 2009 and 2014. After 2014 the two counties competed separately in the Twenty20 Cup, as Cambridgeshire Women and Huntingdonshire Women, and, with the discontinuation of the Women's County Championship after the 2019 season, Cambridgeshire and Huntingdonshire no longer compete as a unified team.

== History ==
Cambridgeshire and Huntingdonshire Women joined the Women's Twenty20 Cup in 2009 and the Women's County Championship in 2010. In their first season in the County Championship, they were promoted from Division 5E, winning five out of six games. After being relegated in 2012, they remained in the bottom tier of the competition until the final season of the Championship in 2019. They were also promoted in the Twenty20 Cup in 2010 Women's Twenty20 Cup, but were relegated the following season. In 2014, Cambridgeshire and Huntingdonshire split into Cambridgeshire Women and Huntingdonshire Women for the Twenty20 competition. Cambridgeshire have competed in every season since then, whilst Huntingdonshire competed in 2014 and returned in 2021.

== Seasons ==
=== Women's County Championship ===
Season	Division	League standings								Notes
Season	Division	P	W	L	T	A/C	BP	Pts	Pos	Notes
2010	Division 5E	6	5	0	0	1	33	83	1st	Promoted
2011	Division 4	10	1	8	0	1	47	57	6th	
2012	Division 3	8	1	3	0	4	15	25	8th	Relegated
2013	Division 4 N&E	4	1	2	0	1	14	24	4th	
2014	Division 4 N&E	4	0	3	0	1	9	9	5th	
2015	Division 4 N&E	4	1	3	0	0	22	32	3rd	
2016	Division 4 N&E	5	0	5	0	0	23	23	6th	
2017	Division 3C	5	0	5	0	0	19	19	6th	
2018	Division 3D	6	1	5	0	0	21	26	4th	
2019	Division 3B	5	0	5	0	0	14	14	6th	

=== Women's Twenty20 Cup ===
Season	Division	League standings								Notes
Season	Division	P	W	L	T	A/C	NRR	Pts	Pos	Notes
2009	Division 8	3	0	3	0	0	–	0	4th	
2010	Division S3	2	2	0	0	0	+2.38	4	1st	Promoted
2011	Division S2	3	0	3	0	0	−2.50	0	4th	Relegated
2012	Division S3	3	2	1	0	0	−0.54	4	2nd	Lost promotion play-off
2013	Division S3	2	0	2	0	0	−1.40	0	3rd	

== See also ==
- Cambridgeshire County Cricket Club
- Cambridgeshire Women cricket team
- Huntingdonshire County Cricket Club
- Huntingdonshire Women cricket team
