= East of England Women's County Championship =

English women's cricket competition

- Countries: England
- Format: Limited overs cricket
- First edition: 2020
- Latest edition: 2023
- Tournament format: League system
- Number of teams: 6
- Current champion: Leicestershire
- Website: East of England Women's County Championship

The East of England Women's County Championship is a domestic women's one-day cricket competition in England. The tournament began in 2020, with the aim of providing longer-format cricket in the East of England region after reforms to the structure of domestic women's cricket in England. The tournament currently sees six teams competing in a 45-over competition.

== History ==
The East of England Women's County Championship was originally conceived in 2020 as a 50-over competition to provide longer-format cricket in the region after the abolition of the Women's County Championship. However, the COVID-19 pandemic delayed the start of the season and caused that year's national Women's Twenty20 Cup to be cancelled, resulting in a decision to play a 45-over competition (to allow extra time for sanitisation breaks) as well as a separate Twenty20 competition.

Buckinghamshire, Hertfordshire, Huntingdonshire and Norfolk competed in 2020. The 45-over tournament was won by Hertfordshire and the Twenty20 tournament was won by Buckinghamshire.

The 2021 edition was competed as a 45-over tournament, with Cambridgeshire and Lincolnshire joining to make it a six-team event. Each team played the other teams once in a round robin format, starting on 2 May, with the team with the most points being crowned champions. Buckinghamshire won the tournament, winning four of their five matches to finish top of the league with 73 points, with Hertfordshire second with 70 points.

Ahead of the 2022 season, it was announced that Leicestershire, Northamptonshire and Suffolk would be joining the competition, whilst Buckinghamshire and Cambridgeshire would be withdrawing, bringing the number of teams competing to seven. Suffolk won the competition, winning five of their six matches.

Ahead of the 2023 season, Lincolnshire withdrew from the tournament, making it a six team competition. Leicestershire won the tournament, with four wins and a tie.

== Teams ==
=== Current teams ===
Team	First	Titles
Hertfordshire	2020	1
Huntingdonshire	2020	0
Leicestershire	2022	1
Norfolk	2020	0
Northamptonshire	2022	0
Suffolk	2022	1

=== Former teams ===
Team	Span	Titles
Buckinghamshire	2020–2021	2
Cambridgeshire	2021	0
Lincolnshire	2021–2022	0

== Results ==
Season	Winner	Runner-up	Leading run-scorer	Leading wicket-taker	Ref
2020 (45-over)	Hertfordshire	Norfolk	Amelia Kemp (Herts) 152	Charley Phillips (Herts) 7	
2020 (T20)	Buckinghamshire	Hertfordshire	Ellie Stanley (Norfolk) 138	Ella Phillips (Herts) 8	
2021	Buckinghamshire	Hertfordshire	Kezia Hassall (Herts) 492	Emily Marriott (Lincs) 12	
2022	Suffolk	Hertfordshire	Isobel Sidhu (Suffolk) 260	Aimee Colquhoun (Leics) 11	
2023	Leicestershire	Hertfordshire	Kezia Hassall (Herts) 253	Sophie Hughes (Suffolk) 11	
