= Georgia Hennessy =

English cricketer

Personal information
- Full name: Georgia May Hennessy
- Born: 4 November 1996 (age 30); Worcester, Worcestershire, England
- Batting: Right-handed
- Bowling: Right-arm medium
- Role: All-rounder

Domestic team information
- Years: Team
- 2010–2012: Worcestershire
- 2013–2017: Warwickshire
- 2016–2017: Western Storm
- 2018–2019: Devon
- 2020–2021: Somerset
- 2020–2022: Western Storm
- 2021–2022: Welsh Fire
- 2022: Wales

Career statistics
Competition	WLA	WT20
Matches	77	89
Runs scored	1,610	2,026
Batting average	25.15	33.21
100s/50s	1/7	0/11
Top score	105	97*
Balls bowled	2,165	1,116
Wickets	64	46
Bowling average	23.50	25.50
5 wickets in innings	2	0
10 wickets in match	0	0
Best bowling	5/38	3/14
Catches/stumpings	31/–	26/–
- Source: CricketArchive, 7 November 2022

Georgia May Hennessy (born 4 November 1996) is an English former cricketer who played as an all-rounder, batting right-handed and bowling right-arm medium. She played for Worcestershire, Warwickshire, Devon, Somerset, Wales, Western Storm and Welsh Fire.

== Early life ==
Hennessy was born on 4 November 1996 in Worcester, Worcestershire. She attends the University of Worcester and plays club cricket for Barnards Green, and was the first woman to hit a century in the Birmingham and District Premier League.

== Domestic career ==
Hennessy made her county debut in 2010 for Worcestershire against Surrey. She scored a duck and did not bowl. She remained with Worcestershire until 2012, and in her final season with the club scored her maiden half-century, scoring 66* against Cheshire.

Hennessy joined Warwickshire ahead of the 2013 season. She started strongly for her new side in the 2013 Women's Twenty20 Cup, scoring 137 runs, the most for the team that season, including two half-centuries. The following season, she hit what was at the time her highest List A score, hitting 84 against Surrey, as well as taking her maiden five-wicket haul in the same match. In the 2015 Women's County Championship, Hennessey was her side's leading run-scorer, with 200 runs at an average of 50.00, and took her second five-wicket haul, taking 5/44 against Middlesex. Hennessy was also Warwickshire's leading run-scorer in two consecutive T20 Cups, in 2015 and 2016.

Hennessy joined Devon ahead of the 2018 season and made an immediate impression, ending the 2018 Championship season as the side's leading run-scorer, with 174 runs at an average of 34.80. She only played two Twenty20 matches that season, but still managed to hit 97* in a match against Buckinghamshire. In 2019, Hennessy had a strong Twenty20 Cup, topping both the run-scoring and wicket-taking charts for Devon, with 119 runs and 6 wickets.

In 2020, Hennessy moved to Somerset, but did not play for them that year due to the 2020 season's cancellation during the COVID-19 pandemic. She made her debut for her new side in the 2021 Women's Twenty20 Cup, scoring 61 and 78 and taking 5 wickets on the opening weekend double-header against Staffordshire. She ended the season as the second-highest run-scorer across the whole tournament, with 261 runs at an average of 52.20, as Somerset won the West Midlands Group. Hennessy joined Wales ahead of the 2022 season. She was the side's leading run-scorer in the tournament, with 170 runs including one half-century against Gloucestershire, as well as taking three wickets.

Hennessy also played for Western Storm in the Women's Cricket Super League in 2016 and 2017. She was ever-present in both seasons, scoring 45 runs and taking 3 wickets in 2016 and scoring 110 runs in 2017. In 2017, Storm won the Super League, and Hennessy put on a vital partnership of 44 with Stafanie Taylor in the semi-final to help her side on the way to the title.

In 2020, Hennessy returned to Western Storm for the 2020 Rachael Heyhoe Flint Trophy. She played all 6 matches, scoring 209 runs at an average of 34.83, as well as taking 11 wickets, the joint-leading wicket-taker for the side. She hit her maiden List A century, scoring 105, against Sunrisers, as well as taking 4/31 against South East Stars. In December 2020, it was announced that Hennessy was one of the 41 female cricketers that had signed a full-time domestic contract.

In 2021, she was Western Storm's leading wicket-taker in the Rachael Heyhoe Flint Trophy, with 9 wickets, although she struggled with the bat. She also took 2 wickets in the Charlotte Edwards Cup, as well as scoring 102 runs, including 62 made against Sunrisers. Meanwhile, for Welsh Fire in The Hundred, Hennessy scored 58 runs and took 2 wickets in 8 matches. In 2022, she was Western Storm's joint-leading run-scorer in the Charlotte Edwards Cup, with 158 runs including a half-century against South East Stars. She also played two matches in the Rachael Heyhoe Flint Trophy. She was again in the Welsh Fire squad in The Hundred, but did not play a match.

Hennessy played for Sapphires in the 2012 Super Fours, and was part of various England Development programmes, starting in 2012.

At the end of the 2022 season, it was announced that Hennessy was stepping away from cricket to "pursue opportunities outside of the game".
