= 2017 Western Storm season =

English cricket season

Western Storm
2017 season
- Coach: Trevor Griffin
- Captain: Heather Knight
- Overseas player: Holly Huddleston; Rachel Priest; Stafanie Taylor
- WCSL: Champions
- Most runs: Rachel Priest (261)
- Most wickets: Stafanie Taylor (9)
- Most catches: Heather Knight (3); Georgia Hennessy (3); Fran Wilson (3)
- Most wicket-keeping dismissals: Rachel Priest (8)

The 2017 season was Western Storm's second season, in which they competed in the Women's Cricket Super League, a Twenty20 competition. The side finished third in the initial group stage, therefore progressing to the semi-final, where they beat Surrey Stars by three wickets. In the final, they faced Southern Vipers in a repeat of the previous season's final. This time, however, Western Storm were victorious by seven wickets to claim their first title.

The side was captained by Heather Knight and coached by the newly appointed Trevor Griffin. They played one of their home matches at the County Ground, Taunton and their other home match at the County Ground, Bristol.

== Squad ==
Western Storm's 15-player squad for the season is listed below. Age given is at the start of Western Storm's first match of the season (10 August 2017).

Name	Nationality	Birth date	Batting Style	Bowling Style	Notes
Batsmen
Sophie Luff	England	6 December 1993 (aged 23)	Right-handed	Right-arm medium	
Lauren Parfitt	Wales	1 April 1994 (aged 23)	Right-handed	Left-arm medium	
Fran Wilson	England	7 November 1991 (aged 25)	Right-handed	Right arm off break	
All-rounders
Georgia Hennessy	England	4 November 1996 (aged 20)	Right-handed	Right arm medium	
Heather Knight	England	26 December 1990 (aged 26)	Right-handed	Right arm off break	Captain
Alice Macleod	England	14 May 1994 (aged 23)	Right-handed	Right arm off break	
Stafanie Taylor	West Indies	11 June 1991 (aged 26)	Right-handed	Right arm off break	Overseas player
Wicket-keepers
Amara Carr	England	17 April 1994 (aged 23)	Right-handed	—	
Rachel Priest	New Zealand	13 June 1985 (aged 32)	Right-handed	—	Overseas player
Bowlers
Jodie Dibble	England	17 September 1994 (aged 22)	Right-handed	Slow left-arm orthodox	
Freya Davies	England	27 October 1995 (aged 21)	Right-handed	Right arm medium	
Danielle Gibson	England	30 April 2001 (aged 16)	Right-handed	Right arm medium	
Holly Huddleston	New Zealand	11 October 1987 (aged 29)	Right-handed	Right arm medium	Overseas player
Claire Nicholas	Wales	8 September 1986 (aged 30)	Right-handed	Right-arm off break	
Anya Shrubsole	England	7 December 1991 (aged 25)	Right-handed	Right arm medium	

== Women's Cricket Super League ==
=== Season standings ===
Pos	Team	Pld	W	L	T	NR	BP	Pts	NRR
1	Southern Vipers	5	4	1	0	0	4	20	2.001
2	Surrey Stars	5	4	1	0	0	2	18	0.291
3	Western Storm	5	3	2	0	0	0	12	−0.887
4	Loughborough Lightning	5	2	3	0	0	2	10	0.664
5	Yorkshire Diamonds	5	2	3	0	0	0	8	−0.318
6	Lancashire Thunder	5	0	5	0	0	0	0	−1.692

Source: ESPN Cricinfo

Advanced to the Final.
Advanced to the Semi-final.

=== League stage ===
10 August 2017
14:30
Scorecard

Western Storm; 70 (18.5 overs)	v	Southern Vipers; 73/1 (9 overs)
Georgia Hennessy 22 (31); Tash Farrant 2/10 (4 overs)		Suzie Bates 47* (31); Stafanie Taylor 1/3 (2 overs)

Southern Vipers won by 9 wickets
Rose Bowl, Southampton
Umpires: David Millns and Steve O'Shaugnessy
Player of the match: Suzie Bates (Southern Vipers)

- Southern Vipers won the toss and elected to field.
- Points: Southern Vipers 5, Western Storm 0

12 August 2017
12:00
Scorecard

Loughborough Lightning; 108/9 (20 overs)	v	Western Storm; 109/5 (19.1 overs)
Ellyse Perry 25 (28); Stafanie Taylor 4/5 (4 overs)		Stafanie Taylor 34 (32); Georgia Elwiss 2/24 (4 overs)

Western Storm won by 5 wickets
County Ground, Taunton
Umpires: Ian Blackwell and Nick Cook
Player of the match: Stafanie Taylor (Western Storm)

- Western Storm won the toss and elected to field.
- Points: Western Storm 4, Loughborough Lightning 0

20 August 2017
14:30
Scorecard

Yorkshire Diamonds; 160/7 (20 overs)	v	Western Storm; 161/0 (17 overs)
Lauren Winfield 58 (44); Holly Huddleston 1/19 (4 overs)		Rachel Priest 106* (65)

Western Storm won by 10 wickets
Clifton Park Ground, York
Umpires: Ben Debenham and James Middlebrook
Player of the match: Rachel Priest (Western Storm)

- Western Storm won the toss and elected to field.
- Points: Western Storm 4, Yorkshire Diamonds 0

23 August 2017
14:00
Scorecard

Surrey Stars; 169/6 (20 overs)	v	Western Storm; 117 (19.3 overs)
Lizelle Lee 72 (44); Claire Nicholas 3/20 (4 overs)		Alice Macleod 30 (29); Nat Sciver 3/11 (3.3 overs)

Surrey Stars won by 52 runs
The Oval, London
Umpires: Ian Blackwell and Chris Watts
Player of the match: Lizelle Lee (Surrey Stars)

- Western Storm won the toss and elected to field.
- Points: Surrey Stars 5, Western Storm 0

26 August 2017
14:30
Scorecard

Lancashire Thunder; 122/5 (20 overs)	v	Western Storm; 123/5 (17.1 overs)
Amy Satterthwaite 44 (41); Freya Davies 2/24 (4 overs)		Rachel Priest 52 (26); Danielle Hazell 2/14 (4 overs)

Western Storm won by 5 wickets
County Ground, Bristol
Umpires: Tom Lungley and Russell Warren
Player of the match: Rachel Priest (Western Storm)

- Western Storm won the toss and elected to bat.
- Points: Western Storm 4, Lancashire Thunder 0

=== Semi-final ===
1 September
14:15
Scorecard

Surrey Stars; 100/7 (20 overs)	v	Western Storm; 101/7 (18.5 overs)
Sophia Dunkley 30 (33); Anya Shrubsole 3/22 (4 overs)		Stafanie Taylor 37* (45); Marizanne Kapp 3/11 (4 overs)

Western Storm won by 3 wickets
County Cricket Ground, Hove
Umpires: David Millns and Martin Saggers
Player of the match: Stafanie Taylor (Western Storm)

- Surrey Stars won the toss and elected to bat.

=== Final ===
1 September
18:00 (D/N)
Scorecard

Southern Vipers; 145/5 (20 overs)	v	Western Storm; 151/3 (18 overs)
Hayley Matthews 31 (28); Stafanie Taylor 3/28 (4 overs)		Rachel Priest 72 (36); Arran Brindle 1/17 (4 overs)

Western Storm won by 7 wickets
County Cricket Ground, Hove
Umpires: David Millns and Steve O'Shaughnessy
Player of the match: Rachel Priest (Western Storm)

- Western Storm won the toss and elected to field.

== Statistics ==
=== Batting ===
Player	Matches	Innings	NO	Runs	HS	Average	Strike rate	100s	50s	4s	6s
Freya Davies	7	2	0	11	7	5.50	62.22	0	0	0	0
Jodie Dibble	5	2	1	4	2*	4.00	40.00	0	0	0	0
Georgia Hennessy	7	5	0	110	28	22.00	80.88	0	0	12	3
Holly Huddleston	4	2	1	4	2*	4.00	36.36	0	0	0	0
Heather Knight	7	7	1	103	48*	17.16	101.98	0	0	10	2
Sophie Luff	7	6	3	84	30*	28.00	96.55	0	0	11	0
Alice Macleod	7	5	2	41	30	13.66	74.54	0	0	3	0
Claire Nicholas	7	2	1	4	4*	4.00	50.00	0	0	0	0
Rachel Priest	7	7	1	261	106*	43.50	164.15	1	2	36	9
Anya Shrubsole	5	2	0	12	12	6.00	85.71	0	0	1	1
Stafanie Taylor	7	6	2	113	37*	28.25	85.60	0	0	12	1
Fran Wilson	7	6	0	28	10	4.66	62.22	0	0	2	0
Source: ESPN Cricinfo

=== Bowling ===
Player	Matches	Innings	Overs	Maidens	Runs	Wickets	BBI	Average	Economy	Strike rate
Freya Davies	7	7	22.0	0	165	5	2/24	33.00	7.50	26.4
Jodie Dibble	5	5	16.0	0	111	1	1/27	111.00	6.93	96.0
Georgia Hennessy	7	1	1.0	0	10	0	–	–	10.00	–
Holly Huddleston	4	4	11.0	0	104	2	1/19	52.00	9.45	33.0
Heather Knight	7	6	14.0	0	102	3	1/8	34.00	7.28	28.0
Claire Nicholas	7	7	23.0	2	126	8	3/20	15.75	5.47	17.2
Anya Shrubsole	5	5	20.0	0	131	6	3/22	21.83	6.55	17.2
Stafanie Taylor	7	7	22.0	1	105	9	4/5	11.66	4.77	14.6
Source: ESPN Cricinfo

=== Fielding ===
Player	Matches	Innings	Catches
Freya Davies	7	7	0
Jodie Dibble	5	5	2
Georgia Hennessy	7	7	3
Holly Huddleston	4	4	1
Heather Knight	7	7	3
Sophie Luff	7	7	0
Alice Macleod	7	7	1
Claire Nicholas	7	7	2
Anya Shrubsole	5	5	1
Stafanie Taylor	7	7	2
Fran Wilson	7	7	3
Source: ESPN Cricinfo

=== Wicket-keeping ===
Player	Matches	Innings	Catches	Stumpings
Rachel Priest	7	7	1	7
Source: ESPN Cricinfo
