= Miranda Veringmeier =

Dutch cricketer (born 1992)

Personal information
- Full name: Miranda Veringmeier
- Born: 22 July 1992 (age 34); Schiedam, Netherlands
- Batting: Right-handed
- Role: Wicket-keeper

International information
- National side: Netherlands (2008–2021)
- ODI debut (cap 75): 2 July 2008 v West Indies
- Last ODI: 24 November 2011 v Ireland
- T20I debut (cap 10): 1 July 2008 v West Indies
- Last T20I: 30 August 2021 v Ireland

Domestic team information
- Years: Team
- 2016: Worcestershire

Career statistics
Competition	WODI	WT20I	WLA	WT20
Matches	15	19	69	53
Runs scored	93	324	1,977	942
Batting average	6.20	20.25	31.38	21.40
100s/50s	0/0	0/2	4/10	0/4
Top score	19	60	137	62
Balls bowled	12	30	228	54
Wickets	0	2	9	3
Bowling average	–	11.50	17.33	14.66
5 wickets in innings	0	0	0	0
10 wickets in match	0	0	0	0
Best bowling	–	2/10	4/12	2/10
Catches/stumpings	2/1	6/–	30/10	17/11
- Source: ESPNcricinfo, 30 August 2021

Miranda Veringmeier (born 22 July 1992) is a Dutch cricketer who plays as a right-handed batter and wicket-keeper. She has played 15 One Day Internationals and 17 Twenty20 Internationals for the Netherlands since making her debut in 2008, at the age of 15. She also played for the Netherlands in the English domestic system between 2009 and 2015, and played for Worcestershire in 2016. In October 2021, Veringmeier announced her retirement from international cricket.

== Career ==
Veringmeier made her Twenty20 International debut in 2008, against the West Indies, in which she scored 4 from 3 deliveries. She made her One Day International debut the following day against the same opposition, scoring 3 runs. She made her T20I high score in her third match in the format, scoring 60 from 48 balls against Ireland.

In 2015, Veringmeier was selected to be a part of the inaugural Associate Rookie program for the Women's Big Bash League, in which she trained with the Adelaide Strikers.

Veringmeier has scored 4 List A centuries, all of which came in the Women's County Championship when the Netherlands were part of the English domestic system. Her highest List A score came in 2013, when she hit 137 against Scotland. She was the third-highest run-scorer in the 2015 Women's County Championship and fifth-highest in the 2016 Women's County Championship. In 2016, she played in the Twenty20 Cup for Worcestershire, in which she scored 95 runs at an average of 15.83.

In May 2019, she was named in Netherlands' squad for the 2019 ICC Women's Qualifier Europe tournament in Spain. In August 2019, she was named in the Dutch squad for the 2019 ICC Women's World Twenty20 Qualifier tournament in Scotland.
