= 2015 Women's Twenty20 Cup =

- Administrator(s): England and Wales Cricket Board
- Cricket format: Twenty20
- Tournament format(s): League system
- Champions: Sussex (2nd title)
- Participants: 38
- Most runs: Danni Wyatt (287)
- Most wickets: Megan Fairclough (15); Jenny Gunn (15)

The 2015 Women's Twenty20 Cup, known for sponsorship reasons as the 2015 NatWest Women's Twenty20 Cup, was the 7th cricket Women's Twenty20 Cup tournament. It took place between June and August, with 38 teams taking part: 34 county teams, alongside Scotland, Ireland, Wales and Netherlands. Sussex Women won the Twenty20 Cup, achieving their second title. The tournament ran alongside the 50-over 2015 Women's County Championship.

== Competition format ==
Teams played matches within a series of divisions with the winners of the top division being crowned the Champions. Matches were played using a Twenty20 format.

The championship worked on a points system with positions within the divisions being based on the total points. Points were awarded as follows:

Win: 4 points.
Tie: 1 point.
Loss: 0 points.
Abandoned/Cancelled: 1 point.

== Teams ==
The 2015 Women's Twenty20 Cup was divided into four divisions: Divisions One, Two and Three with nine teams each and Division Four with 11 teams, divided into three regional groups; teams in the top three divisions played each other once, and teams in Division Four played between four and six matches. The top team in each Division Four group progressed to a final group of three, with the top two being promoted.

Division One	Berkshire	Ireland	Kent	Middlesex	Nottinghamshire	Somerset	Surrey	Sussex	Yorkshire
Division Two	Cheshire	Derbyshire	Durham	Essex	Lancashire	Netherlands	Staffordshire	Wales	Warwickshire
Division Three	Buckinghamshire	Cornwall	Devon	Gloucestershire	Hampshire	Northamptonshire	Oxfordshire	Scotland	Worcestershire
Division Four - Group A	Cambridgeshire	Leicestershire and Rutland	Norfolk	Suffolk					
Division Four - Group B	Dorset	Hertfordshire	Wiltshire						
Division Four - Group C	Cumbria	Lincolnshire	Northumberland	Shropshire					

== Division One ==
Team	Pld	W	L	T	A	C	NRR	Ded	Pts
Sussex (C)	8	6	2	0	0	0	+0.56	0	24
Yorkshire	8	6	2	0	0	0	+0.51	0	24
Kent	8	6	2	0	0	0	–0.10	0	24
Middlesex	8	5	3	0	0	0	+1.34	0	20
Ireland	8	3	4	0	1	0	−0.36	0	13
Nottinghamshire	8	3	5	0	0	0	+0.45	0	12
Berkshire	8	3	5	0	0	0	–0.34	0	12
Somerset (R)	8	2	5	0	1	0	−0.59	0	9
Surrey (R)	8	0	6	0	2	0	−2.12	0	2

Source: ECB Women's Twenty20 Cup

== Division Two ==
Team	Pld	W	L	T	A	C	NRR	Ded	Pts
Lancashire (P)	8	8	0	0	0	0	+2.28	0	32
Warwickshire (P)	8	6	2	0	0	0	+1.82	0	24
Essex	8	5	3	0	0	0	+0.31	0	20
Netherlands	8	4	4	0	0	0	–0.84	0	16
Staffordshire	8	4	4	0	0	0	–0.22	0	16
Wales	8	3	5	0	0	0	−0.24	0	12
Durham	8	2	5	0	0	1	−0.55	0	9
Cheshire (R)	8	2	6	0	0	0	−1.39	0	8
Derbyshire (R)	8	1	6	0	0	1	−1.38	0	5

Source: ECB Women's Twenty20 Cup

== Division Three ==
Team	Pld	W	L	T	A	C	NRR	Ded	Pts
Worcestershire (P)	8	8	0	0	0	0	+2.77	0	32
Hampshire (P)	8	7	1	0	0	0	+1.54	0	28
Devon	8	6	2	0	0	0	+2.55	0	24
Scotland	8	5	3	0	0	0	+0.22	0	20
Northamptonshire	8	3	5	0	0	0	–1.02	0	12
Cornwall	8	3	5	0	0	0	−1.21	0	12
Oxfordshire	8	2	6	0	0	0	−1.51	0	8
Gloucestershire (R)	8	2	6	0	0	0	−0.78	0	8
Buckinghamshire (R)	8	0	8	0	0	0	−2.32	0	0

Source: ECB Women's Twenty20 Cup

== Division Four ==
=== Group A ===
Team	Pld	W	L	T	A	C	NRR	Ded	Pts
Leicestershire and Rutland	4	4	0	0	0	0	+3.16	0	16
Suffolk	4	3	1	0	0	0	+0.14	0	12
Norfolk	4	1	3	0	0	0	–2.20	0	4
Cambridgeshire	4	0	4	0	0	0	−0.72	0	0

Source: ECB Women's Twenty20 Cup

=== Group B ===
Team	Pld	W	L	T	A	C	NRR	Ded	Pts
Hertfordshire	6	6	0	0	0	0	+1.64	0	24
Dorset	6	2	4	0	0	0	−0.72	0	8
Wiltshire	6	1	5	0	0	0	−0.87	0	4

Source: ECB Women's Twenty20 Cup

=== Group C ===
Team	Pld	W	L	T	A	C	NRR	Ded	Pts
Shropshire	6	3	0	0	1	2	+2.15	0	15
Cumbria	6	2	1	0	1	2	+0.19	0	11
Lincolnshire	6	1	2	0	1	2	−0.70	0	7
Northumberland	6	0	3	0	1	2	−1.44	0	3

Source: ECB Women's Twenty20 Cup

=== Play-Off ===
Team	Pld	W	L	T	A	C	NRR	Ded	Pts
Hertfordshire (P)	2	2	0	0	0	0	+0.65	0	8
Shropshire (P)	2	1	1	0	0	0	−0.25	0	4
Leicestershire and Rutland	2	0	2	0	0	0	−0.40	0	0

Source: ECB Women's Twenty20 Cup

== Statistics ==
=== Most runs ===
Player	Team	Matches	Innings	Runs	Average	HS	100s	50s
Danni Wyatt	Nottinghamshire	6	6	287	57.40	102	1	2
Jodie Dibble	Devon	4	4	264	264.00	104*	1	1
Thea Brookes	Worcestershire	8	8	260	32.50	73	0	2
Georgia Adams	Sussex	8	8	243	34.71	60	0	3
Chloe Hill	Buckinghamshire	8	8	223	27.87	66	0	2

Source: CricketArchive

=== Most wickets ===
Player	Team	Balls	Wickets	Average	BBI	5w
Megan Fairclough	Lancashire	156	15	5.06	4/9	0
Jenny Gunn	Nottinghamshire	138	15	7.00	5/3	1
Kelly Castle	Essex	174	13	8.61	3/6	0
Holly Colvin	Sussex	192	13	10.69	4/10	0
Ashley Bridges	Cornwall	174	13	13.38	3/15	0

Source: CricketArchive
