= Isla Thomson =

English cricketer (born 2004)

Personal information
- Full name: Isla Sarah Thomson
- Born: 27 July 2004 (age 22)
- Batting: Right-handed
- Bowling: Right-arm medium
- Role: All-rounder

Domestic team information
- Years: Team
- 2018–present: Wiltshire
- 2023: Western Storm

Career statistics
Competition	WLA	WT20
Matches	4	22
Runs scored	60	379
Batting average	20.00	22.29
100s/50s	0/0	0/2
Top score	30	62*
Balls bowled	40	216
Wickets	0	7
Bowling average	–	33.71
5 wickets in innings	0	0
10 wickets in match	0	0
Best bowling	–	3/22
Catches/stumpings	1/–	4/–
- Source: CricketArchive, 21 October 2023

Isla Sarah Thomson (born 27 July 2004) is an English cricketer who currently captains Wiltshire. She plays as a right-handed batter and right-arm medium bowler.

== Domestic career ==
Thomson made her county debut in 2018, for Wiltshire against Buckinghamshire. She became captain of Wiltshire ahead of the 2021 season. She was Wiltshire's joint-leading wicket-taker in the 2021 Women's Twenty20 Cup, with four wickets at an average of 21.75. In the 2022 Women's Twenty20 Cup, she was Wiltshire's leading run-scorer, with 132 runs at an average of 26.40, including scoring 62* against Dorset. She was Wiltshire's leading run-scorer in the 2023 Women's Twenty20 Cup, with 143 runs in three matches, including one half-century.

In 2022, Thomson was included in the Western Storm Academy. Ahead of the 2023 season, she was promoted to the senior squad. She made her debut for the side on 22 April 2023, against Northern Diamonds in the Rachael Heyhoe Flint Trophy, in which she bowled one over and scored 16*.
