= 2017 Women's Twenty20 Cup =

- Administrator(s): England and Wales Cricket Board
- Cricket format: Twenty20
- Tournament format(s): League system
- Champions: Lancashire (1st title)
- Participants: 36
- Most runs: Jodie Dibble (260)
- Most wickets: Clare Boycott (14)

The 2017 Women's Twenty20 Cup, known for sponsorship reasons as the 2017 NatWest Women's Twenty20 Cup was the 9th cricket Women's Twenty20 Cup tournament. It took place in June and July, with 36 teams taking part: 34 county teams plus Scotland and Wales. Lancashire Women won the Twenty20 Cup, as winners of Division 1, the first of two trophies they won in 2017, along with the County Championship.

The tournament ran alongside the 50-over 2017 Women's County Championship, and was followed by the Twenty20 2017 Women's Cricket Super League, competed for by regional teams.

== Competition format ==
Teams played matches within a series of divisions with the winners of the top division being crowned the Champions. Matches were played using a Twenty20 format.

The championship works on a points system with positions within the divisions being based on the total points. Points were awarded as follows:

Win: 4 points.
Tie: 1 point.
Loss: 0 points.
Abandoned/Cancelled: 1 point.

== Teams ==
The 2017 Women's Twenty20 Cup was divided into three divisions: Division One and Division Two with nine teams each, and Division Three with 18 teams, divided into regional groups of 6 teams apiece; teams in all divisions played eight games.

| Division One | Berkshire | Kent | Lancashire | Middlesex | Somerset | Surrey | Sussex | Warwickshire | Yorkshire |
| Division Two | Derbyshire | Durham | Essex | Hampshire | Nottinghamshire | Scotland A | Staffordshire | Wales | Worcestershire |
| Division Three - Group A | Cornwall | Devon | Dorset | Gloucestershire | Oxfordshire | Wiltshire | | | |
| Division Three - Group B | Cheshire | Cumbria | Leicestershire and Rutland | Lincolnshire | Northumberland | Shropshire | | | |
| Division Three - Group C | Buckinghamshire | Cambridgeshire | Hertfordshire | Norfolk | Northamptonshire | Suffolk | | | |

== Division One ==
| Team | Pld | W | L | T | A | C | NRR | Ded | Pts |
|---|---|---|---|---|---|---|---|---|---|
| Lancashire (C) | 8 | 7 | 1 | 0 | 0 | 0 | +1.48 | 0 | 28 |
| Middlesex | 8 | 5 | 3 | 0 | 0 | 0 | +0.76 | 0 | 20 |
| Sussex | 8 | 4 | 2 | 0 | 0 | 2 | +0.54 | 0 | 18 |
| Warwickshire | 8 | 4 | 4 | 0 | 0 | 0 | +1.29 | 0 | 16 |
| Surrey | 8 | 4 | 4 | 0 | 0 | 0 | −0.36 | 0 | 16 |
| Kent | 8 | 4 | 4 | 0 | 0 | 0 | −0.38 | 0 | 16 |
| Yorkshire | 8 | 3 | 5 | 0 | 0 | 0 | −0.21 | 0 | 12 |
| Somerset (R) | 8 | 1 | 5 | 0 | 0 | 2 | −1.35 | 0 | 6 |
| Berkshire (R) | 8 | 1 | 5 | 0 | 0 | 2 | −2.94 | 0 | 6 |

Source: ECB Women's Twenty20 Cup

== Division Two ==
| Team | Pld | W | L | T | A | C | NRR | Ded | Pts |
|---|---|---|---|---|---|---|---|---|---|
| Nottinghamshire (P) | 8 | 7 | 0 | 0 | 1 | 0 | +1.44 | 0 | 29 |
| Worcestershire (P) | 8 | 5 | 3 | 0 | 0 | 0 | +0.33 | 0 | 20 |
| Hampshire | 8 | 4 | 2 | 0 | 0 | 2 | +1.08 | 0 | 18 |
| Scotland A | 8 | 4 | 4 | 0 | 0 | 0 | −0.08 | 0 | 16 |
| Wales | 8 | 3 | 3 | 0 | 0 | 2 | +0.07 | 0 | 14 |
| Durham | 8 | 3 | 5 | 0 | 0 | 0 | −0.21 | 0 | 12 |
| Derbyshire (R) | 8 | 3 | 5 | 0 | 0 | 0 | −0.83 | 0 | 12 |
| Staffordshire (R) | 8 | 2 | 4 | 0 | 0 | 2 | −0.83 | 0 | 10 |
| Essex (R) | 8 | 1 | 6 | 0 | 1 | 0 | −0.79 | 0 | 5 |

Source: ECB Women's Twenty20 Cup

== Division Three ==
=== Group A ===
| Team | Pld | W | L | T | A | C | NRR | Ded | Pts |
|---|---|---|---|---|---|---|---|---|---|
| Gloucestershire (P) | 8 | 6 | 0 | 0 | 0 | 2 | +2.96 | 0 | 26 |
| Oxfordshire | 8 | 5 | 1 | 0 | 0 | 2 | +1.29 | 0 | 22 |
| Devon | 8 | 4 | 2 | 0 | 0 | 2 | +1.55 | 0 | 18 |
| Cornwall | 8 | 3 | 5 | 0 | 0 | 0 | −0.7 | 0 | 12 |
| Dorset | 8 | 2 | 6 | 0 | 0 | 0 | −1.04 | 0 | 8 |
| Wiltshire | 8 | 1 | 7 | 0 | 0 | 0 | −1.94 | 0 | 4 |

Source: ECB Women's Twenty20 Cup

=== Group B ===
| Team | Pld | W | L | T | A | C | NRR | Ded | Pts |
|---|---|---|---|---|---|---|---|---|---|
| Cheshire (P) | 8 | 7 | 1 | 0 | 0 | 0 | +2.00 | 0 | 28 |
| Leicestershire and Rutland | 8 | 5 | 2 | 0 | 1 | 0 | +0.77 | 0 | 21 |
| Shropshire | 8 | 4 | 3 | 0 | 1 | 0 | −0.44 | 0 | 17 |
| Northumberland | 8 | 4 | 4 | 0 | 0 | 0 | +0.28 | 0 | 16 |
| Lincolnshire | 8 | 3 | 5 | 0 | 0 | 0 | −1.42 | 0 | 12 |
| Cumbria | 8 | 0 | 8 | 0 | 0 | 0 | −2.25 | 0 | 0 |

Source: ECB Women's Twenty20 Cup

=== Group C ===
| Team | Pld | W | L | T | A | C | NRR | Ded | Pts |
|---|---|---|---|---|---|---|---|---|---|
| Northamptonshire (P) | 8 | 7 | 1 | 0 | 0 | 0 | +2.00 | 0 | 28 |
| Hertfordshire | 8 | 6 | 2 | 0 | 0 | 0 | +1.00 | 0 | 24 |
| Norfolk | 8 | 5 | 3 | 0 | 0 | 0 | +0.36 | 0 | 20 |
| Suffolk | 8 | 3 | 5 | 0 | 0 | 0 | −0.08 | 0 | 12 |
| Buckinghamshire | 8 | 2 | 6 | 0 | 0 | 0 | −1.60 | 0 | 8 |
| Cambridgeshire | 8 | 1 | 7 | 0 | 0 | 0 | −2.02 | 0 | 4 |

Source: ECB Women's Twenty20 Cup

== Statistics ==
=== Most runs ===
| Player | Team | Matches | Innings | Runs | Average | HS | 100s | 50s |
|---|---|---|---|---|---|---|---|---|
| Jodie Dibble | Nottinghamshire | 8 | 8 | 260 | 37.14 | 78* | 0 | 2 |
| Gabrielle Basketter | Wales | 6 | 6 | 253 | 50.60 | 94* | 0 | 2 |
| Natalie Samuels | Suffolk | 6 | 6 | 231 | 57.75 | 69 | 0 | 1 |
| Kezia Hassall | Hertfordshire | 8 | 8 | 230 | 38.33 | 61* | 0 | 1 |
| Emma Lamb | Lancashire | 8 | 8 | 230 | 28.75 | 52 | 0 | 1 |

Source: CricketArchive

=== Most wickets ===
| Player | Team | Balls | Wickets | Average | BBI | 5w |
|---|---|---|---|---|---|---|
| Clare Boycott | Worcestershire | 185 | 14 | 8.64 | 3/11 | 0 |
| Sophia Dunkley | Middlesex | 186 | 13 | 11.53 | 4/24 | 0 |
| Rebecca Tyson | Hertfordshire | 125 | 12 | 7.66 | 3/6 | 0 |
| Rebecca Grundy | Warwickshire | 138 | 12 | 7.91 | 4/14 | 0 |
| Hannah Jones | Surrey | 132 | 12 | 9.08 | 3/8 | 0 |

Source: CricketArchive
