= 2009 Women's Twenty20 Cup =

- Administrator(s): England and Wales Cricket Board
- Cricket format: Twenty20
- Tournament format(s): League system
- Champions: Surrey (1st title)
- Participants: 32
- Most runs: Ebony Rainford-Brent (90)
- Most wickets: Jodie Dibble (6); Abbi Aitken (6)

The 2009 Women's Twenty20 Cup was the inaugural cricket Women's Twenty20 Cup tournament. It took place in July, with 32 teams taking part: 30 county teams plus Wales and Scotland. Surrey Women won the Twenty20 Cup, as champions of Division One. The tournament ran alongside the 50-over 2009 Women's County Championship.

== Competition format ==
Teams played matches within a series of divisions with the winners of the top division being crowned the Champions. Matches were played using a Twenty20 format.

The championship worked on a points system with positions within the divisions being based on the total points. Points were awarded as follows:

Win: 2 points.
Tie: 1 point.
Loss: 0 points.
Abandoned/Cancelled: 1 point.

== Teams ==
The 2009 Women's Twenty20 Cup was divided into eight divisions, Division One to Division Eight. Teams played each other once.

Division One	Berkshire	Kent	Surrey	Sussex
Division Two	Lancashire	Somerset	Warwickshire	Yorkshire
Division Three	Cheshire	Derbyshire	Essex	Middlesex
Division Four	Devon	Scotland	Staffordshire	Worcestershire
Division Five	Hampshire	Hertfordshire	Norfolk	Northamptonshire
Division Six	Durham	Gloucestershire	Wales	Wiltshire
Division Seven	Cumbria	Dorset	Northumberland	Shropshire
Division Eight	Buckinghamshire	Cambridgeshire and Huntingdonshire	Oxfordshire	Suffolk

== Division One ==
Team	Pld	W	L	T	A	C	NRR	Ded	Pts
Surrey (C)	3	2	0	0	0	1	−0.36	0	5
Kent	3	1	1	0	0	1	+0.97	0	3
Berkshire	3	0	1	0	1	1	−0.40	0	2
Sussex	3	0	1	0	1	1	−1.05	0	2

Source: ECB Women's Twenty20 Cup

== Division Two ==
Team	Pld	W	L	T	A	C	NRR	Ded	Pts
Somerset	3	2	0	0	1	0	+1.23	0	5
Lancashire	3	1	1	0	0	1	+0.45	0	3
Yorkshire	3	1	1	0	0	1	−0.05	0	3
Warwickshire	3	0	2	0	1	0	−1.63	0	1

Source: ECB Women's Twenty20 Cup

== Division Three ==
Team	Pld	W	L	T	A	C	NRR	Ded	Pts
Essex	3	2	0	0	0	1	+0.61	0	5
Cheshire	3	1	1	0	0	1	+1.08	0	3
Middlesex	3	1	1	0	0	1	−0.25	0	3
Derbyshire	3	0	2	0	0	1	−1.23	0	1

Source: ECB Women's Twenty20 Cup

== Division Four ==
Team	Pld	W	L	T	A	C	NRR	Ded	Pts
Devon	3	2	1	0	0	0	+1.03	0	4
Staffordshire	3	2	1	0	0	0	+0.47	0	4
Worcestershire	3	2	1	0	0	0	−0.30	0	4
Scotland	3	0	3	0	0	0	−1.17	0	0

Source: ECB Women's Twenty20 Cup

== Division Five ==
Team	Pld	W	L	T	A	C	NRR	Ded	Pts
Northamptonshire	3	2	1	0	0	0	+1.13	0	4
Hampshire	3	2	1	0	0	0	−2.73	0	4
Norfolk	3	1	2	0	0	0	+0.99	0	2
Hertfordshire	3	1	2	0	0	0	+0.02	0	2

Source: ECB Women's Twenty20 Cup

== Division Six ==
Team	Pld	W	L	T	A	C	NRR	Ded	Pts
Durham	3	0	0	0	3	0	−	0	3
Gloucestershire	3	0	0	0	3	0	−	0	3
Wales	3	0	0	0	3	0	−	0	3
Wiltshire	3	0	0	0	3	0	−	0	3

All games abandoned due to rain.

Source: ECB Women's Twenty20 Cup

== Division Seven ==
Team	Pld	W	L	T	A	C	NRR	Ded	Pts
Cumbria	3	0	0	0	3	0	−	0	3
Dorset	3	0	0	0	3	0	−	0	3
Northumberland	3	0	0	0	3	0	−	0	3
Shropshire	3	0	0	0	3	0	−	0	3

All games abandoned due to rain.

Source: ECB Women's Twenty20 Cup

== Division Eight ==
Team	Pld	W	L	T	A	C	NRR	Ded	Pts
Oxfordshire	3	3	0	0	0	0	+0.65	0	6
Suffolk	3	2	1	0	0	0	+0.71	0	4
Buckinghamshire	3	1	2	0	0	0	−1.37	0	2
Cambridgeshire and Huntingdonshire	3	0	3	0	0	0	−	0	0

Source: ECB Women's Twenty20 Cup

== Statistics ==
=== Most runs ===
Player	Team	Matches	Innings	Runs	Average	HS	100s	50s
Ebony Rainford-Brent	Surrey	2	2	90	45.00	58	0	1
Charlotte Edwards	Kent	2	1	71	–	71*	0	1
Amara Carr	Devon	3	3	63	31.50	39*	0	0
Penny Everett	Suffolk	2	2	62	62.00	58*	0	1
Alice Macleod	Berkshire	2	1	60	60.00	60	0	1

Source: CricketArchive

=== Most wickets ===
Player	Team	Balls	Wickets	Average	BBI	5w
Jodie Dibble	Devon	48	6	5.16	4/1	0
Abbi Aitken	Scotland	54	6	9.33	3/21	0
Beth MacGregor	Essex	47	5	3.60	3/6	0
Fi Morris	Oxfordshire	48	5	4.00	3/6	0
Emma Sampson	Surrey	36	5	4.20	3/12	0

Source: CricketArchive
