= 2014 Women's County Championship =

- Administrator(s): England and Wales Cricket Board
- Cricket format: 50 over
- Tournament format(s): League system
- Champions: Kent (6th title)
- Participants: 37
- Most runs: Charlotte Edwards (491)
- Most wickets: Jo Gardner (19)

The 2014 Women's County One-Day Championship was the 18th cricket Women's County Championship season. It ran from May to September and saw 33 county teams and teams representing Ireland, Scotland, Wales and the Netherlands compete in a series of divisions. Kent Women won the County Championship as winners of the top division, with Surrey finishing runners-up. The Championship was Kent's sixth title, and their third in four seasons.

== Competition format ==
Teams played matches within a series of divisions with the winners of the top division being crowned County Champions. Matches were played using a one day format with 50 overs per side.

The championship worked on a points system, the winner being the team with most average points of completed games in the first division. The points are awarded as follows:

Win: 10 points + bonus points.
Tie: 5 points + bonus points.
Loss: Bonus points.
Abandoned or cancelled: Match not counted to average.

Bonus points are awarded for various batting and bowling milestones. The bonus points for each match are retained if the match is completed.

- Batting

1.50 runs per over (RPO) or more: 1 point
2 RPO or more: 2 points
3 RPO or more: 3 points
4 RPO or more: 4 points

- Bowling

3-4 wickets taken: 1 point
5-6 wickets taken: 2 points
7-8 wickets taken: 3 points
9-10 wickets taken: 4 points

== Teams ==
The 2014 Championship was divided into four divisions: Divisions One to Three with nine teams apiece and Division Four with two groups of five.

Teams in each group played each other once.

Division One	Berkshire	Essex	Kent	Middlesex	Nottinghamshire	Surrey	Sussex	Warwickshire	Yorkshire
Division Two	Cheshire	Devon	Durham	Ireland	Lancashire	Somerset	Staffordshire	Wales	Worcestershire
Division Three	Derbyshire	Gloucestershire	Hampshire	Hertfordshire	Leicestershire and Rutland	Netherlands	Northamptonshire	Oxfordshire	Scotland
Division Four North & East	Cambridgeshire and Huntingdonshire	Cumbria	Norfolk	Northumberland	Suffolk				
Division Four South & West	Buckinghamshire	Cornwall	Dorset	Shropshire	Wiltshire				

== Division One ==
Team	Pld	W	L	T	A	Bat	Bowl	Ded	Pts	Avg.
Kent (C)	8	6	0	0	2	24	24	0	108	18.00
Surrey	8	5	2	0	1	24	22	0	96	13.71
Berkshire	8	3	2	0	3	16	18	0	64	12.80
Nottinghamshire	8	4	3	0	1	23	23	0	86	12.29
Sussex	8	3	3	0	2	21	17	0	68	11.33
Middlesex	8	2	3	0	3	15	13	0	48	9.60
Yorkshire	8	2	4	0	2	20	15	0	55	9.17
Warwickshire (PO)	8	1	5	0	2	16	12	0	38	6.33
Essex (R)	8	1	5	0	2	10	10	0	30	5.00

Source: ECB Women's County Championship

== Division Two ==
Team	Pld	W	L	T	A	Bat	Bowl	Ded	Pts	Avg.
Lancashire (P)	8	6	1	0	1	24	25	0	109	15.57
Somerset (PO)	8	6	2	0	0	27	26	0	113	14.13
Devon	8	5	2	0	1	21	19	0	90	12.86
Staffordshire	8	5	3	0	0	22	24	0	96	12.00
Ireland	8	5	3	0	0	23	23	0	96	12.00
Wales	8	3	4	0	1	18	21	0	69	9.86
Durham	8	2	6	0	0	13	22	0	55	6.88
Worcestershire (PO)	8	1	6	0	1	18	12	0	40	5.71
Cheshire (R)	8	1	7	0	0	20	14	0	44	5.50

Source: ECB Women's County Championship

== Division Three ==
Team	Pld	W	L	T	A	Bat	Bowl	Ded	Pts	Avg.
Scotland (P)	8	7	1	0	0	28	29	0	127	15.88
Netherlands (PO)	8	5	2	0	1	21	26	0	97	13.86
Northamptonshire	8	4	2	0	2	18	22	0	80	13.33
Derbyshire	8	4	3	1	0	26	27	0	98	12.25
Leicestershire and Rutland	8	5	3	0	0	26	21	0	97	12.13
Oxfordshire	8	2	5	1	0	17	23	0	65	8.13
Hertfordshire	8	2	5	0	1	15	16	0	51	7.29
Hampshire	8	2	5	0	1	19	10	0	49	7.00
Gloucestershire (R)	8	1	6	0	1	15	9	0	34	4.86

Source: ECB Women's County Championship

== Division Four ==
=== North & East ===
Team	Pld	W	L	T	A	Bat	Bowl	Ded	Pts	Avg.
Suffolk (PO)	4	4	0	0	0	14	16	0	70	17.50
Cumbria	4	2	2	0	0	10	12	0	42	10.50
Norfolk	4	2	2	0	0	9	13	0	42	10.50
Northumberland	4	1	2	0	1	3	8	0	21	7.00
Cambridgeshire and Huntingdonshire	4	0	3	0	1	5	4	0	9	3.00

Source: ECB Women's County Championship

=== South & West ===
Team	Pld	W	L	T	A	Bat	Bowl	Ded	Pts	Avg.
Cornwall (PO)	4	4	0	0	0	14	14	0	68	17.00
Shropshire	4	3	1	0	0	13	15	0	58	14.50
Buckinghamshire	4	1	2	0	1	8	9	0	27	9.00
Wiltshire	4	1	3	0	0	10	9	0	29	7.25
Dorset	4	0	3	0	1	6	6	0	12	4.00

Source: ECB Women's County Championship

== Promotion play-offs ==
The teams finishing second in Divisions Two and Three played against the teams finishing second bottom in Divisions One and Two, respectively, for the chance of promotion. The winners of the two Division Four groups played off for promotion to Division Three.

14 September 2014	Warwickshire; 221/7 (50 overs)	v	Somerset; 220 (50 overs)	Warwickshire won by 3 wickets
Scorecard	Warwickshire; 221/7 (50 overs)	v	Somerset; 220 (50 overs)	Scorers, Shirley
Scorecard	Hannah Shipman 124 (143); Lorraine Szczepanksi 2/33 (8 overs)		Fran Wilson 58 (59); Elizabeth Russell 2/24 (9 overs)	Scorers, Shirley
Somerset won the toss and elected to bat.; Warwickshire remain in Division One.				Scorers, Shirley

13 September 2014	Worcestershire; 129 (47.4 overs)	v	Netherlands; 91 (35.2 overs)	Worcestershire won by 38 runs
Scorecard	Worcestershire; 129 (47.4 overs)	v	Netherlands; 91 (35.2 overs)	Church Lane, Birlingham; Umpires: John Pluck and Paul Shannon
Scorecard	Katie Blunt 29 (42); Heather Siegers 4/16 (9 overs)		Sterre Kalis 29 (86); Katie Blunt 3/20 (10 overs)	Church Lane, Birlingham; Umpires: John Pluck and Paul Shannon
Netherlands won the toss and elected to field.; Worcestershire remain in Division Two.				Church Lane, Birlingham; Umpires: John Pluck and Paul Shannon

14 September 2014	Cornwall; 111 (43.3 overs)	v	Suffolk; 172/6 (50 overs)	Suffolk won by 61 runs
Scorecard	Cornwall; 111 (43.3 overs)	v	Suffolk; 172/6 (50 overs)	Umpires: Rob Bartlett and Terry Spice
Scorecard	Sophie Mackenzie 21 (48); Sheldene Ford-Keeble 3/18 (7 overs)		Emma Elsom 52 (93); Ashley Bridges 2/40 (10 overs)	Umpires: Rob Bartlett and Terry Spice
Suffolk won the toss and elected to bat.; Suffolk are promoted to Division Three.				Umpires: Rob Bartlett and Terry Spice

== Statistics ==
=== Most runs ===
Player	Team	Matches	Innings	Runs	Average	HS	100s	50s
Charlotte Edwards	Kent	6	6	491	98.20	151	3	1
Tammy Beaumont	Kent	6	6	417	104.25	107	1	4
Danni Wyatt	Nottinghamshire	8	8	403	57.57	116	2	0
Fran Wilson	Somerset	9	9	370	46.25	89	0	4
Rosalie Birch	Devon	7	7	352	58.66	96*	0	4

Source: CricketArchive

=== Most wickets ===
Player	Team	Balls	Wickets	Average	BBI	5w
Jo Gardner	Northamptonshire	356	19	9.47	5/23	2
Sarah Sundaram	Derbyshire	456	18	12.88	5/28	1
Erin Bermingham	Kent	323	16	8.31	4/16	0
Esther de Lange	Netherlands	432	16	11.87	3/8	0
Lynn McDonnell	Durham	350	15	12.46	5/25	1

Source: CricketArchive
