= Suffolk Women cricket team =

English county cricket team

Suffolk Women

Personnel
- Captain: Natalie Samuels

Team information
- Founded: Unknown First recorded match: 2007
- Home ground: Various

History
- WCC wins: 0
- T20 Cup wins: 0
- Official website: Suffolk Cricket

The Suffolk Women's cricket team is the women's representative cricket team for the English historic county of Suffolk. They play their home games at various grounds across the county, including Wamil Way, Mildenhall and Woolpit CC, Woolpit. They are captained by Natalie Samuels. In 2019, they played in Division Three of the final season of the Women's County Championship, and have since competed in the Women's Twenty20 Cup. They are partnered with the regional side Sunrisers.

== History ==
Suffolk Women joined the county system in 2007, competing in the County Challenge Cup, the lower tier of the Women's County Championship, in which they lost all three of their games. The next few seasons saw similarly poor performances, but the team improved from 2011 onwards, and Suffolk topped Division 4 North & East for three consecutive seasons in 2012, 2013 and 2014, missing out on promotion in play-offs in the first two instances, before finally achieving Division 3 status in 2014, beating Cornwall in a play-off by 61 runs. However, Suffolk were relegated in 2015 and have since only played in the lowest tier of the Championship, missing out on promotion in a play-off once again in 2018.

In the Women's Twenty20 Cup, Suffolk have similarly played in the lower tiers of the competition, but did manage to gain promotion to Division South 2 in 2011, and in 2016 they topped Division 4A, going through the season unbeaten. In 2021, they competed in the East Group of the Twenty20 Cup, finishing 3rd with 4 victories. Suffolk batter Imogen Sidhu was the leading run-scorer across the whole competition, with 293 runs including 4 half-centuries. In 2022, they won their group of the Twenty20 Cup, finishing second in the initial group stage before beating Cambridgeshire and Essex on the group Finals Day to emerge victorious. They also began competing in the East of England Women's County Championship in 2022, and won the competition, winning five of their six matches. They finished bottom of their group in the 2023 Women's Twenty20 Cup, and finished third in the East of England Women's County Championship. In 2024, the side finished 8th in their group in the Twenty20 Cup and 5th in their group in the new ECB Women's County One-Day tournament.

== Players ==
=== Current squad ===
Based on appearances in the 2023 season.

Name	Nationality	2023 Appearances		Notes
Name	Nationality	WT20	EoE	Notes
Natalie Samuels	England	4	3	Club captain
Jess Board	England	0	3	
Amelie Clarke	England	6	5	
Emily Cunningham	New Zealand	4	4	
Emma Howard	England	1	0	
Sophie Hughes	England	6	5	
Olivia Hyndman	England	5	4	
Olivia Locke	England	0	2	
Lara Neild	England	6	4	
CJ Oastler	England	3	5	Wicket-keeper
Maddie Reynolds	England	6	0	
Imogen Sidhu	England	6	5	
Isobel Sidhu	England	6	4	
Poppy Sidhu	England	6	5	
Sophie Singer	England	5	1	
Lauren Swinburne	England	5	4	
Petra Tweedy	England	1	3	

== Seasons ==
=== Women's County Championship ===
Season	Division	League standings								Notes
Season	Division	P	W	L	T	A/C	BP	Pts	Pos	Notes
2007	County Challenge Cup G3	3	0	3	0	0	4	4	4th	
2008	Division 5 L&E	3	0	2	0	1	0	10	4th	
2009	Division 5 S&E	3	1	2	0	0	5	25	3rd	
2010	Division 5E	6	1	5	0	0	20	30	4th	
2011	Division 5E	5	2	3	0	0	27	47	2nd	
2012	Division 4 N&E	4	3	0	0	1	24	54	1st	Lost promotion playoff
2013	Division 4 N&E	4	4	0	0	0	27	67	1st	Lost promotion playoff
2014	Division 4 N&E	4	4	0	0	0	30	70	1st	Promoted
2015	Division 3	8	0	6	1	1	33	38	9th	Relegated
2016	Division 4 N&W	5	3	1	0	1	25	55	2nd	
2017	Division 3D	4	2	2	0	0	22	42	3rd	
2018	Division 3D	6	5	1	0	0	42	92	1st	Lost promotion playoff
2019	Division 3B	5	2	3	0	0	25	45	5th	

=== Women's Twenty20 Cup ===
Season	Division	League standings								Notes
Season	Division	P	W	L	T	A/C	NRR	Pts	Pos	Notes
2009	Division 8	3	2	1	0	0	+0.71	4	2nd	
2010	Division S3	2	0	2	0	0	−2.29	0	3rd	
2011	Division S3	2	1	1	0	0	+1.06	2	1st	Promoted
2012	Division S2	3	0	2	0	1	−6.30	0	4th	
2013	Division S2	3	0	3	0	0	−2.76	0	4th	
2014	Division 4A	4	2	2	0	0	−0.39	8	5th	
2015	Division 4A	4	3	1	0	0	+0.14	12	2nd	
2016	Division 4A	6	6	0	0	0	+0.88	24	1st	
2017	Division 3C	8	3	5	0	0	−0.08	12	4th	
2018	Division 3C	8	3	5	0	0	−1.49	12	5th	
2019	Division 3B	8	2	6	0	0	−0.46	8	7th	
2021	East	8	4	2	0	2	+0.39	18	3rd	
2022	Group 4	6	4	2	0	0	–0.23	16	2nd	Group winners
2023	Group 7	6	0	5	0	1	–1.83	1	4th	
2024	Group 3	8	1	6	0	1	–0.79	40	8th	

=== ECB Women's County One-Day ===
Season	Group	League standings								Notes
Season	Group	P	W	L	T	A/C	BP	Pts	Pos	Notes
2024	Group 2	4	2	2	0	0	2	10	5th	

== Honours ==
- Women's Twenty20 Cup:
  - Group winners (1) – 2022

== See also ==
- Suffolk County Cricket Club
- Sunrisers (women's cricket)
