= Hertfordshire Women cricket team =

English county cricket team

Hertfordshire Women
- Nickname: Moosettes

Personnel
- Captain: Kezia Hassall
- Coach: Luke Heskett

Team information
- Founded: Unknown First recorded match: 1935
- Home ground: Various

History
- WCC wins: 0
- T20 Cup wins: 0
- Official website: Hertfordshire Cricket

The Hertfordshire Women's cricket team is the women's representative cricket team for the English historic county of Hertfordshire. They play their home games at various grounds across the county, including Knebworth Park, Knebworth and London Road, Tring. They are captained by Kezia Hassall. In 2019, they played in Division Three of the final season of the Women's County Championship, and in 2021 won the East Group of the Women's Twenty20 Cup.

== History ==
=== 1935–2000: Early History ===
Hertfordshire Women played their first recorded match in 1935, against Civil Service Women. They went on to play various other matches throughout the 1940s and 1950s, including a match against a touring Australia side in 1951. In 1980, East Anglia Women, which included players from Hertfordshire, joined the Women's Area Championship.

=== 2001–2024: Women's County Championship ===
Hertfordshire Women joined the Women's County Championship in 2001, replacing East Anglia Women, finishing 5th in Division Two in their first season. After being relegated in 2003, they played in the County Challenge Cup, the tier below the County Championship, for the next four seasons. Returning to the Championship proper in 2008, Hertfordshire have since played in the lower divisions of the structure, achieving their best performance in 2016, when they won Division Four North & East.

In the Women's Twenty20 Cup, which they joined for its inaugural season in 2009, Hertfordshire have fared similarly, playing mostly in Division 3. In 2012, they had a chance at promotion from South Division 2, but lost to Essex in the Division final, whilst they finished 2nd in Division 3C in 2017, with six wins from eight games. In 2020, after the county season was cancelled due to the COVID-19 pandemic, Hertfordshire competed in the East of England Championship, and won the 45-over competition. In 2021, they won the East Group of the Twenty20 Cup, going unbeaten with 5 victories and 3 matches abandoned due to rain. They also again competed in the East of England Championship, finishing second in the 45-over competition to Buckinghamshire. They finished second in their group of the 2022 Women's Twenty20 Cup, and again finished second in the East of England Championship. They again finished second in both competitions in 2023. In 2024, the side qualified from their group in the Twenty20 Cup before finishing second overall at the National Finals, and finished 2nd in their group in the new ECB Women's County One-Day tournament.

=== 2025– Women's Professional restructure ===
From 2025 Hertfordshire will be part of Tier 3 in the new Women's Professional Structure . Hertfordshire have been placed in Division 1 of the Metro Bank One Day Cup Women's league Three and Division 1 South in the Vitality Blast Women's League 3

== Players ==
=== Current squad ===
Based on appearances in the 2023 season.

Squad No.	Name	Nationality	2024 Appearances	Notes
2	Amelia Kemp	England	16	
4	Saskia Heard	England	3	
6	Kezia Hassall	England	20	Club captain
7	Millie Dyer	England	9	
8	Hayley Arrol	England	2	
12	Charlotte Banks	England	12	
14	Chloe Eayrs	England	19	
15	Charley Phillips	England	16	
17	Rebecca Tyson	England	21	
19	Gemma Marriott	England	14	
21	Lucy Bell	England	14	
23	Elsa Barnfather	England	16	
27	Ella Phillips	England	20	
28	Elizabeth Ruxton	England	7	
31	Eva Cullen	England	17	
50	Jenna Botha	England	12	
64	Mabel Reid	England	22	

=== Notable players ===
Players who have played for Hertfordshire and played internationally are listed below, in order of first international appearance (given in brackets):

- (Sri Lanka) Rose Fernando (1997)
- (New Zealand) Sian Ruck (2009)

== Seasons ==
=== Women's County Championship ===
Season	Division	League standings								Notes
Season	Division	P	W	L	T	A/C	BP	Pts	Pos	Notes
2001	Division 2	5	1	4	0	0	28	40	5th	
2002	Division 2	5	2	1	0	2	22	68	3rd	
2003	Division 2	5	0	5	0	0	19.5	19.5	6th	Relegated
2004	County Challenge Cup G2	2	1	1	0	0	14.5	26.5	2nd	
2005	County Challenge Cup G2	3	2	1	0	0	24.5	48.5	1st	Lost promotion playoff
2006	County Challenge Cup G2	3	2	1	0	0	0	40	2nd	
2007	County Challenge Cup G3	3	2	0	0	1	0	60	1st	Lost promotion playoff
2008	Division 5 L&E	3	2	1	0	0	4	44	2nd	Promoted
2009	Division 4	10	7	3	0	0	11	151	3rd	
2010	Division 4	9	4	3	0	2	35	75	4th	
2011	Division 4	10	6	3	0	1	53	113	2nd	
2012	Division 3	8	3	2	0	3	31	61	4th	
2013	Division 3	8	4	4	0	0	48	88	5th	
2014	Division 3	8	2	5	0	1	31	51	7th	
2015	Division 3	8	2	4	0	2	24	44	8th	Relegated
2016	Division 4 N&E	5	4	0	0	1	29	69	1st	
2017	Division 3C	5	1	4	0	0	20	10	5th	
2018	Division 3C	6	0	6	0	0	16	16	4th	
2019	Division 3B	5	2	3	0	0	27	47	4th	

=== Women's Twenty20 Cup ===
Season	Division	League standings								Notes
Season	Division	P	W	L	T	A/C	NRR	Pts	Pos	Notes
2009	Division 5	3	1	2	0	0	+0.02	2	4th	
2010	Division S2	3	1	2	0	0	−0.24	2	3rd	
2011	Division S2	3	1	2	0	0	– (Note: NRR unknown due to unrecorded matches)	2	3rd	
2012	Division S2	3	1	1	0	1	−1.11	3	2nd	Lost promotion play-off
2013	Division S2	3	1	2	0	0	+0.27	2	3rd	
2014	Division 3B	4	0	4	0	0	−0.78	0	9th	Relegated
2015	Division 4B	6	6	0	0	0	+1.64	24	1st	Promoted
2016	Division 3	8	2	6	0	0	−1.05	8	8th	
2017	Division 3C	8	6	2	0	0	+1.00	24	2nd	
2018	Division 3C	8	4	4	0	0	−0.12	16	3rd	
2019	Division 3B	8	4	4	0	0	+0.22	16	3rd	
2021	East	8	5	0	0	3	+3.52	23	1st	Group winners
2022	Group 7	6	4	2	0	0	+1.57	16	2nd	
2023	Group 7	6	3	1	0	2	–0.06	14	2nd	Lost final
2024	Group 3	8	5	1	0	2	+1.68	91	2nd	2nd in National Finals Group

=== ECB Women's County One-Day ===
Season	Group	League standings								Notes
Season	Group	P	W	L	T	A/C	BP	Pts	Pos	Notes
2024	Group 2	4	3	0	0	1	3	16	2nd	

== Honours ==
- Women's Twenty20 Cup:
  - Group winners (1) – 2021

== See also ==
- Hertfordshire County Cricket Club
