= Cornwall Women cricket team =

English county cricket team

Cornwall Women

Personnel
- Captain: Kellie Williams
- Coach: Robin Trethowan

Team information
- Founded: Unknown First recorded match: 2005
- Home ground: Various Including Boscawen Park, Truro

History
- WCC wins: 0
- T20 Cup wins: 0
- Official website: Cornwall Women Cricket

The Cornwall Women's cricket team is the women's representative cricket team for the English historic county of Cornwall. They play their home games at various grounds across the county, and are captained by Kellie Williams. In 2019, they played in Division 3 of the final season of the Women's County Championship, and they have since competed in the Women's Twenty20 Cup. They are partnered with the regional side Western Storm.

== History ==
Cornwall Women began playing in national competition in 2005, when they joined the County Challenge Cup, the second tier of the Women's County Championship: they finished bottom of their division with one win, against Devon. After the County Championship expanded in 2008, they immediately won promotion to Division 4, where they remained for two seasons before being relegated in 2010. Since then, they have remained in the lowest tier of the County Championship, but did top their division in 2013, 2014 and 2018 before losing play-offs to gain promotion.

In the Women's Twenty20 Cup, Cornwall Women have consistently played in Division 3 of the tournament in recent years, after a successful season in 2014, winning all of their matches to be promoted from Division 4. In 2021, Cornwall competed in the South West Group of the Twenty20 Cup and finished 3rd with 4 wins. They finished second in Group 8 of the Twenty20 Cup in 2022, before losing in the group final to Devon. The side finished bottom of their group in the 2023 Women's Twenty20 Cup. In 2024, the side finished 9th in their group in the Twenty20 Cup and 7th in their group in the new ECB Women's County One-Day tournament.

== Players ==
=== Current squad ===
Based on appearances in the 2023 season.

Name	Nationality	Apps	Notes				
Name	Nationality	Apps	Notes	Kellie Williams	England	3	Club captain
Millie Bray	England	1					
Caitlin Burnett	England	4					
Keira De Villiers	England	1					
Hannah Dodd	England	2					
Tilly Dodd	England	2					
Robyn Edge	England	2					
Bernadette Forge	England	4	Wicket-keeper				
Emily Geach	England	0					
Isabel Grant-French	England	2	Wicket-keeper				
Lucie Oakley	England	4					
Rebecca Odgers	England	4					
Isabelle Peacock	England	2					
Emma Proctor	England	4					
Sophie Richards	England	4					
Tegan Smith	England	4					

=== Notable players ===
Players who have played for Cornwall and played internationally are listed below, in order of first international appearance (given in brackets):

- (England) Laura Harper (1999)

== Seasons ==
=== Women's County Championship ===
Season	Division	League standings								Notes
Season	Division	P	W	L	T	A/C	BP	Pts	Pos	Notes
2005	County Challenge Cup G4	3	1	2	0	0	16	28	4th	
2006	County Challenge Cup G4	3	0	3	0	0	8	8	4th	
2007	County Challenge Cup G1	3	1	1	0	1	5	40	3rd	
2008	Division 5 S&W	4	3	1	0	0	5	65	2nd	Promoted
2009	Division 4	10	1	9	0	0	30	50	5th	
2010	Division 4	9	0	8	0	1	20	20	6th	Relegated
2011	Division 5 S&W	8	3	3	0	2	28	58	4th	
2012	Division 4 S&W	4	1	1	0	2	11	21	3rd	
2013	Division 4 S&W	4	4	0	0	0	26	66	1st	Lost promotion playoff
2014	Division 4 S&W	4	4	0	0	0	28	68	1st	Lost promotion playoff
2015	Division 4 S&W	5	2	1	0	2	18	38	3rd	
2016	Division 4 S&W	4	1	1	0	2	9	19	2nd	
2017	Division 3B	4	1	2	1	0	22	37	3rd	
2018	Division 3B	6	5	1	0	0	43	93	1st	Lost promotion playoff
2019	Division 3C	5	2	2	0	1	25	50	3rd	

=== Women's Twenty20 Cup ===
Season	Division	League standings								Notes
Season	Division	P	W	L	T	A/C	NRR	Pts	Pos	Notes
2010	Division S&W 2	3	0	3	0	0	−1.57	0	4th	
2011	Division S&W 2	3	2	1	0	0	−1.45	4	3rd	
2012	Division S&W 2	3	2	1	0	0	+1.02	4	2nd	Promoted
2013	Division S&W 1	3	0	3	0	0	−4.50	0	4th	
2014	Division 4D	4	4	0	0	0	+2.51	16	1st	Promoted
2015	Division 3	8	3	5	0	0	−1.21	12	6th	
2016	Division 3	8	2	6	0	0	−1.24	8	7th	
2017	Division 3A	8	3	5	0	0	−0.70	12	4th	
2018	Division 3A	8	5	3	0	0	+0.09	20	3rd	
2019	Division 3A	8	4	4	0	0	+0.40	16	3rd	
2021	South West	8	4	2	0	2	+0.45	18	3rd	
2022	Group 8	6	3	2	0	1	–0.16	13	2nd	Lost final
2023	Group 8	6	0	2	0	4	–2.93	4	4th	
2024	Group 4	8	0	6	0	2	–2.36	27	9th	

=== ECB Women's County One-Day ===
Season	Group	League standings								Notes
Season	Group	P	W	L	T	A/C	BP	Pts	Pos	Notes
2024	Group 3	4	1	3	0	0	1	5	7th	

== See also ==
- Cornwall County Cricket Club
- Western Storm
