= Dorset Women cricket team =

English county cricket team

Dorset Women

Personnel
- Captain: Victoria Pack

Team information
- Founded: Unknown First recorded match: 2005
- Home ground: Various Including Chapel Gate, Bournemouth

History
- WCC wins: 0
- T20 Cup wins: 0
- Official website: Dorset Cricket Board

The Dorset Women's cricket team is the women's representative cricket team for the English historic county of Dorset. They play their home games at various grounds across the county, including Chapel Gate, Bournemouth and are captained by Victoria Pack. In 2019, they played in Division Three of the final season of the Women's County Championship, and have since competed in the Women's Twenty20 Cup. They are partnered with the regional side Southern Vipers.

== History ==
Before joining the national structure of women's cricket, Dorset Women played various games as a joint side with Hampshire Women, beginning in 1936. In 2001 a reformed side played Devon in a friendly match. The following year they began competing in the South West County Championship, with Devon and Cornwall. In 2005, they joined the Women's County Championship as part of the County Challenge Cup, winning their group with two wins out of three. However, they failed to gain promotion in the play-off round. Joining the County Championship proper in 2008, Dorset have since always competed in the lowest tier of the competition. Their best finish was 2nd in Division Five South & West in 2011, but in the three following years failed to win a game, and in the five seasons since have only won one game per season. In the Women's Twenty20 Cup, which they joined for its inaugural season in 2009, they have also always played in the bottom tier of competition, achieving their best season in 2018, winning four out of eight games. In 2021, they competed in the South West Group of the Twenty20 Cup, finishing 4th with 2 victories, both on the same day against Wiltshire, with Dorset batter Victoria Pack hitting 79* in the first match and 115* in the second. They finished bottom of their group in the 2022 Women's Twenty20 Cup. They also joined the South Central Counties Cup in 2022, finishing bottom in the inaugural edition. They again finished bottom of their Women's Twenty20 Cup group in 2023, whilst they finished fifth out of six in the South Central Counties Cup. In 2024, the side finished 8th in their group in the Twenty20 Cup and 9th in their group in the new ECB Women's County One-Day tournament.

== Players ==
=== Current squad ===
Based on appearances in the 2023 season.

Name	Nationality	2023 Appearances		Notes
Name	Nationality	WT20	SCCC	Notes
Victoria Pack	England	5	4	Club captain
Rebecca Baron	England	1	0	
Megan Bishop	England	4	4	
Emelia Butler	England	3	2	
Katie Butler	England	5	5	Wicket-keeper
Caitlin Chissell	England	0	4	Dual-registration with Hampshire
Matilda Churchill	England	1	2	
Freya Cutler	England	4	2	
Leah Cutler	England	2	4	
Loren Dean	England	1	5	
Ceri Harris	England	4	0	
Katie Harris	England	4	2	
Anya Hughes	England	0	1	
Mamta Kothiyal	India	5	3	
Isabel Makroum	England	3	0	
Isabelle Riley	England	2	2	
Emily Roberts	England	5	5	
Evie Snow	England	0	2	
Amelie Whitaker	England	2	4	
Lizzie Williams	England	4	5	

=== Notable players ===
Players who have played for Dorset and played internationally are listed below, in order of first international appearance (given in brackets):

- (Cook Islands) Gabby Sullivan (2025)

== Seasons ==
=== Women's County Championship ===
Season	Division	League standings								Notes
Season	Division	P	W	L	T	A/C	BP	Pts	Pos	Notes
2005	County Challenge Cup G4	3	2	1	0	0	26	50	1st	Lost promotion playoff
2006	County Challenge Cup G4	3	2	1	0	0	1	41	2nd	
2007	County Challenge Cup G1	3	2	1	0	0	1	51	2nd	
2008	Division 5 S&W	4	1	3	0	0	12	32	4th	
2009	Division 5 S&W	5	1	4	0	0	12	32	5th	
2010	Division 5 S&W	6	3	3	0	0	32	62	3rd	
2011	Division 5 S&W	8	3	2	0	3	27	57	2nd	
2012	Division 4 S&W	4	0	2	0	2	10	10	4th	
2013	Division 4 S&W	4	0	4	0	0	9	9	5th	
2014	Division 4 S&W	4	0	3	0	1	12	12	5th	
2015	Division 4 S&W	5	1	3	0	1	18	28	5th	
2016	Division 4 S&W	4	1	2	0	1	16	26	3rd	
2017	Division 3B	4	1	3	0	0	14	24	4th	
2018	Division 3B	6	1	5	0	0	17	27	4th	
2019	Division 3C	5	1	3	0	1	15	30	5th	

=== Women's Twenty20 Cup ===
Season	Division	League standings								Notes
Season	Division	P	W	L	T	A/C	NRR	Pts	Pos	Notes
2009	Division 7	3	0	0	0	3	–	3	1st	
2010	Division S&W 2	3	1	2	0	0	+0.03	2	3rd	
2011	Division S&W 2	3	0	3	0	0	−1.91	0	4th	
2012	Division S&W 2	3	0	3	0	0	−1.77	0	4th	
2013	Division S&W 2	3	1	2	0	0	−2.47	2	3rd	
2014	Division 4D	4	2	2	0	0	−0.85	8	6th	
2015	Division 4B	6	2	4	0	0	−0.72	8	2nd	
2016	Division 4B	6	0	4	0	2	−3.32	2	4th	
2017	Division 3A	8	2	6	0	0	−1.04	8	5th	
2018	Division 3A	8	4	4	0	0	−0.84	16	4th	
2019	Division 3A	8	1	5	0	2	−3.08	6	5th	
2021	South West	8	2	2	0	4	+2.70	12	4th	
2022	Group 8	6	1	5	0	0	–0.99	4	4th	
2023	Group 3	6	0	4	0	2	–3.01	2	4th	
2024	Group 4	8	1	5	0	2	–3.50	41	8th	

=== ECB Women's County One-Day ===
Season	Group	League standings								Notes
Season	Group	P	W	L	T	A/C	BP	Pts	Pos	Notes
2024	Group 3	4	0	3	1	0	0	2	9th	

== See also ==
- Dorset County Cricket Club
- Southern Vipers
