= 2012 Women's County Championship =

- Administrator(s): England and Wales Cricket Board
- Cricket format: 50 over
- Tournament format(s): League system
- Champions: Kent (5th title)
- Participants: 37
- Most runs: Sarah Taylor (345)
- Most wickets: Isobelle Watson (18)

The 2012 Women's County One-Day Championship was the 16th cricket Women's County Championship season. It ran from May to September and saw 33 county teams and teams representing Ireland, Scotland, Wales and the Netherlands compete in a series of divisions. Kent Women won the County Championship as winners of the top division, beating Essex in the division final. The Championship was Kent's fifth title, and their second in two seasons.

== Competition format ==
Teams played matches within a series of divisions with the winners of the top division being crowned County Champions. Matches were played using a one day format with 50 overs per side.

The championship worked on a points system, with placings decided by average points of completed games. The top two in each division played in a final to determine the winner, subsequently followed by promotion play-offs. The points are awarded as follows:

Win: 10 points + bonus points.
Tie: 5 points + bonus points.
Loss: Bonus points.
Abandoned or cancelled: Match not counted to average.

Bonus points are awarded for various batting and bowling milestones. The bonus points for each match are retained if the match is completed.

- Batting

1.50 runs per over (RPO) or more: 1 point
2 RPO or more: 2 points
3 RPO or more: 3 points
4 RPO or more: 4 points

- Bowling

3-4 wickets taken: 1 point
5-6 wickets taken: 2 points
7-8 wickets taken: 3 points
9-10 wickets taken: 4 points

== Teams ==
The 2012 Championship was divided into four divisions: Divisions One to Three with nine teams apiece and Division Four with two groups of five.

Teams in each group played each other once.

Division One	Berkshire	Essex	Kent	Middlesex	Nottinghamshire	Somerset	Surrey	Sussex	Yorkshire
Division Two	Cheshire	Devon	Durham	Lancashire	Netherlands	Staffordshire	Wales	Warwickshire	Worcestershire
Division Three	Cambridgeshire and Huntingdonshire	Derbyshire	Gloucestershire	Hampshire	Hertfordshire	Ireland	Leicestershire and Rutland	Northamptonshire	Scotland
Division Four North & East	Buckinghamshire	Cumbria	Norfolk	Northumberland	Suffolk				
Division Four South & West	Cornwall	Dorset	Oxfordshire	Shropshire	Wiltshire				

== Division One ==
=== Table ===
Team	Pld	W	L	T	A	Bat	Bowl	Ded	Pts	Avg.
Kent (Q)	8	3	0	0	5	12	12	0	54	18.00
Essex (Q)	8	2	0	0	6	8	8	0	36	18.00
Sussex	8	5	0	0	3	18	19	0	87	17.40
Middlesex	8	1	2	0	5	10	8	0	28	9.33
Berkshire	8	1	2	0	5	10	7	0	27	9.00
Nottinghamshire	8	1	2	0	5	7	8	0	25	8.33
Surrey	8	1	2	0	5	9	3	0	22	7.33
Yorkshire (PO)	8	0	2	0	6	6	5	0	11	5.50
Somerset (PO)	8	0	4	0	4	12	9	0	21	5.25

Source: ECB Women's County Championship

=== Play-offs ===
26 August 2012	Yorkshire	v	Somerset	Match Abandoned
Scorecard	Yorkshire	v	Somerset
No toss.; No play was possible due to rain.; Yorkshire remain in Division One.

2 September 2012	Essex; 99 (43.1 overs)	v	Kent; 100/3 (28.1 overs)	Kent won by 7 wickets
Scorecard	Essex; 99 (43.1 overs)	v	Kent; 100/3 (28.1 overs)	Sadler's End, Sindlesham; Umpires: Bob Hampshire and Richard Wheeler
Scorecard	Lauren Onojaife 25 (69); Lynsey Askew 3/20 (8.1 overs)		Charlotte Edwards 32 (60); Leigh Kasperek 2/34 (8 overs)	Sadler's End, Sindlesham; Umpires: Bob Hampshire and Richard Wheeler
Essex won the toss and elected to bat.; Kent won the 2013 Women's County Championship.				Sadler's End, Sindlesham; Umpires: Bob Hampshire and Richard Wheeler

== Division Two ==
=== Table ===
Team	Pld	W	L	T	A	Bat	Bowl	Ded	Pts	Avg.
Warwickshire (PO)	8	6	0	0	2	20	23	0	103	17.17
Worcestershire (PO)	8	4	1	0	3	15	16	0	71	14.20
Devon	8	4	3	0	1	22	22	0	84	12.00
Lancashire	8	4	3	0	1	14	24	0	78	11.14
Cheshire	8	3	3	0	2	15	20	0	65	10.83
Staffordshire	8	2	3	0	3	11	14	0	45	9.00
Wales	8	2	4	0	2	14	15	0	49	8.17
Netherlands (PO)	8	2	5	0	1	16	15	0	51	7.29
Durham (PO)	8	0	5	0	3	9	6	0	15	3.00

Source: ECB Women's County Championship

=== Play-offs ===
26 August 2012	Warwickshire; 166/4 (42.3 overs)	v	Worcestershire; 164/8 (45 overs)	Warwickshire won by 6 wickets
Scorecard	Warwickshire; 166/4 (42.3 overs)	v	Worcestershire; 164/8 (45 overs)	The Wardens, Solihull; Umpires: Ken Hordan and Mike Sheehy
Scorecard	Helen Shipman 89 (122); Georgia Hennessy 1/17 (7 overs)		Charlotte Holtom 53 (106); Kayleigh Alsop 3/21 (9 overs)	The Wardens, Solihull; Umpires: Ken Hordan and Mike Sheehy
Warwickshire won the toss and elected to field.; Match reduced to 45 overs per side.; Warwickshire proceed to Division One/Two play-off.				The Wardens, Solihull; Umpires: Ken Hordan and Mike Sheehy

26 August 2012	Durham	v	Netherlands	Durham won by a walk-over
Scorecard	Durham	v	Netherlands
No toss.; Durham remain in Division Two.

== Division Three ==
=== Table ===
Team	Pld	W	L	T	A	Bat	Bowl	Ded	Pts	Avg.
Ireland (PO)	8	4	0	0	4	16	14	0	70	17.50
Gloucestershire (PO)	8	2	0	0	6	7	8	0	35	17.50
Leicestershire and Rutland	8	2	0	0	6	6	8	0	34	17.00
Hertfordshire	8	3	2	0	3	15	16	0	61	12.20
Derbyshire	8	1	2	0	5	11	9	0	30	10.00
Scotland	8	1	3	0	4	10	8	0	28	7.00
Northamptonshire	8	1	3	0	4	10	8	0	28	7.00
Cambridgeshire and Huntingdonshire (PO)	8	1	3	0	4	8	7	0	25	6.25
Hampshire (PO)	8	0	2	0	6	3	0	0	3	1.50

Source: ECB Women's County Championship

=== Play-offs ===
26 August 2012	Gloucestershire; 112/7 (28 overs)	v	Ireland; 170/3 (28 overs)	Ireland won by 58 runs
Scorecard	Gloucestershire; 112/7 (28 overs)	v	Ireland; 170/3 (28 overs)	The Ship Field, Alveston; Umpires: Howard Hudd and Keith Saunders
Scorecard	Alex MacDonald 42 (60); Laura Delany 3/3 (2 overs)		Isobel Joyce 70 (57); Chloe Davis 2/10 (2 overs)	The Ship Field, Alveston; Umpires: Howard Hudd and Keith Saunders
Gloucestershire won the toss and elected to field.; Match reduced to 28 overs per side.; Ireland proceed to Division Two/Three play-off.				The Ship Field, Alveston; Umpires: Howard Hudd and Keith Saunders

26 August 2012	Cambridgeshire and Huntingdonshire; 178/6 (50 overs)	v	Hampshire; 235/7 (50 overs)	Hampshire won by 57 runs
Scorecard	Cambridgeshire and Huntingdonshire; 178/6 (50 overs)	v	Hampshire; 235/7 (50 overs)	Papworth Cricket Club Ground, Papworth Everard; Umpires: Chris Abbott and Alan Hughes
Scorecard	Lily Reynolds 58 (89); Charlotte Taylor 3/14 (5 overs)		Charlotte Taylor 55 (110); Lily Reynolds 2/37 (7 overs)	Papworth Cricket Club Ground, Papworth Everard; Umpires: Chris Abbott and Alan Hughes
Hampshire won the toss and elected to bat.; Hampshire remain in Division Three.				Papworth Cricket Club Ground, Papworth Everard; Umpires: Chris Abbott and Alan Hughes

== Division Four ==
=== North & East ===
Team	Pld	W	L	T	A	Bat	Bowl	Ded	Pts	Avg.
Suffolk (PO)	4	3	0	0	1	12	12	0	54	18.00
Buckinghamshire	4	2	0	0	2	6	8	0	34	17.00
Northumberland	4	1	2	0	1	4	8	0	22	7.33
Cumbria	4	1	3	0	0	4	8	0	22	5.50
Norfolk	4	1	3	0	0	4	8	0	17	4.25

Source: ECB Women's County Championship

=== South & West ===
Team	Pld	W	L	T	A	Bat	Bowl	Ded	Pts	Avg.
Oxfordshire (PO)	4	3	0	0	1	10	10	0	50	16.67
Shropshire	4	2	1	0	1	8	11	0	39	13.00
Cornwall	4	1	1	0	2	4	7	0	21	10.50
Dorset	4	0	2	0	2	2	8	0	10	5.00
Wiltshire	4	0	2	0	2	4	4	0	8	4.00

Source: ECB Women's County Championship

=== Play-off ===
26 August 2012	Oxfordshire; 106/6 (34 overs)	v	Suffolk; 105 (40 overs)	Oxfordshire won by 4 wickets
Scorecard	Oxfordshire; 106/6 (34 overs)	v	Suffolk; 105 (40 overs)	Campbell Park, Milton Keynes; Umpires: John Wiltshire and Stuart Young
Scorecard	Carla Wood 51* (108); Penny Everett 3/34 (10 overs)		Vicky Mitchell 46 (70); Emilia Bartram 3/6 (8 overs)	Campbell Park, Milton Keynes; Umpires: John Wiltshire and Stuart Young
Oxfordshire won the toss and elected to field.; Oxfordshire proceed to Division Three/Four play-off.				Campbell Park, Milton Keynes; Umpires: John Wiltshire and Stuart Young

== Promotion play-offs ==
The teams that won the Division Finals played against the team that lost the relegation play-off from the Division above for the chance of promotion.

2 September 2012	Somerset; 173/7 (50 overs)	v	Warwickshire; 174/9 (49.4 overs)	Warwickshire won by 1 wicket
Scorecard	Somerset; 173/7 (50 overs)	v	Warwickshire; 174/9 (49.4 overs)	Sadler's End, Sindlesham; Umpires: Howard Hudd and R Parker
Scorecard	Fran Wilson 47 (74); Laura Crofts 3/31 (7 overs)		Kayleigh Alsop 40* (63); Anya Shrubsole 2/23 (10 overs)	Sadler's End, Sindlesham; Umpires: Howard Hudd and R Parker
Warwickshire won the toss and elected to field.; Warwickshire are promoted to Division One.				Sadler's End, Sindlesham; Umpires: Howard Hudd and R Parker

2 September 2012	Cambridgeshire and Huntingdonshire; 164/6 (50 overs)	v	Oxfordshire; 166/2 (39.1 overs)	Oxfordshire won by 8 wickets
Scorecard	Cambridgeshire and Huntingdonshire; 164/6 (50 overs)	v	Oxfordshire; 166/2 (39.1 overs)	Campbell Park, Milton Keynes; Umpires: David Browne and Peter Gibbon
Scorecard	Genny Porter 3/18 (6 overs)		Rhian Todd 64 (90)	Campbell Park, Milton Keynes; Umpires: David Browne and Peter Gibbon
Oxfordshire won the toss and elected to field.; Oxfordshire are promoted to Division Three.				Campbell Park, Milton Keynes; Umpires: David Browne and Peter Gibbon

9 September 2012	Ireland; 215 (44.5 overs)	v	Netherlands; 82 (26 overs)	Ireland won by 133 runs
Scorecard	Ireland; 215 (44.5 overs)	v	Netherlands; 82 (26 overs)	East Grinstead Sports Club Ground, East Grinstead; Umpires: John Booker and Matt French
Scorecard	Clare Shillington 107 (106); Clare Crewdson 4/40 (10 overs)		Heather Siegers 23 (28); Louise McCarthy 4/23 (7 overs)	East Grinstead Sports Club Ground, East Grinstead; Umpires: John Booker and Matt French
Ireland won the toss and elected to bat.; Ireland are promoted to Division Two.				East Grinstead Sports Club Ground, East Grinstead; Umpires: John Booker and Matt French

== Statistics ==
=== Most runs ===
Player	Team	Matches	Innings	Runs	Average	HS	100s	50s
Sarah Taylor	Sussex	5	5	345	115.00	110	2	2
Charlotte Horton	Derbyshire	4	4	317	105.66	177*	1	2
Fran Wilson	Somerset	5	5	296	59.20	89	0	3
Helen Shipman	Warwickshire	8	8	274	45.66	89	0	2
Aylish Cranstone	Devon	6	6	253	63.25	67*	0	2

Source: CricketArchive

=== Most wickets ===
Player	Team	Balls	Wickets	Average	BBI	5w
Isobelle Watson	Warwickshire	415	18	11.05	3/26	0
Katie Blunt	Worcestershire	348	17	8.17	6/22	1
Hazelle Garton	Devon	396	17	10.58	4/18	0
Dawn Prestidge	Cheshire	282	16	6.12	6/14	1
Holly Colvin	Sussex	300	14	7.71	4/24	0

Source: CricketArchive
