= Northumberland Women cricket team =

English county cricket team

Northumberland Women

Team information
- Founded: Unknown First recorded match: 1949
- Home ground: Stocksfield Cricket Club Ground, Stocksfield

History
- WCC wins: 0
- T20 Cup wins: 0
- Official website: Northumberland Cricket Board

The Northumberland Women's cricket team is the women's representative cricket team for the English historic county of Northumberland. They played their home games at Stocksfield Cricket Club Ground, Stocksfield. They competed in the Women's County Championship from 1998 to 2019 and in the Women's Twenty20 Cup from 2009 to 2018. In 2020, it was announced that Northumberland was merging its team with Durham, becoming North East Warriors. They are partnered with the regional side Northern Diamonds.

== History ==
Northumberland Women played their first recorded match in 1949, against Durham. They joined the national county structure in 1998, playing in the Women's County Championship Division 3, winning one out of five games. They played in the Championship for a further two years with little success, before withdrawing and only returning in 2005. Since then, Northumberland consistently played in the bottom tier of the Championship, with their best season coming in 2016, finishing 3rd in Division 4 N&E.

In the Women's Twenty20 Cup, Northumberland performed similarly, playing in Divisions Three and Four. In 2010, they reached a Divisional Final to play for promotion, but lost to Northamptonshire. Northumberland did not compete in the 2019 tournament, but will return in 2021 as North East Warriors, a combined side with Durham.

== Players ==
=== Notable players ===
Players who have played for Northumberland and played internationally are listed below, in order of first international appearance (given in brackets):

- (England) Dorothy Macfarlane (1957)
- (England) Margaret Rutherford (1960)
- (Scotland) Sara MacLean (2001)
- (Scotland) Linda Spence (2001)
- (Germany) Anuradha Doddaballapur (2020)
- (Gibraltar) Lauren Payas (2024)

== Seasons ==
=== Women's County Championship ===
Season	Division	League standings								Notes
Season	Division	P	W	L	T	A/C	BP	Pts	Pos	Notes
1998	Division 3	5	1	4	0	0	27	39	5th	
1999	Division 3	5	0	5	0	0	20.5	20.5	6th	
2000	Division 3	5	0	5	0	0	19.5	19.5	6th	
2005	County Challenge Cup G1	2	0	2	0	0	7.5	7.5	3rd	
2006	County Challenge Cup G1	3	0	3	0	0	0	0	4th	
2007	County Challenge Cup G4	3	0	2	0	1	6	16	4th	
2008	Division 5N	3	0	3	0	0	8	8	4th	
2009	Division 5 N&E	3	1	2	0	0	4	24	4th	
2010	Division 5N	7	1	6	0	0	13	23	5th	
2011	Division 5N	4	1	3	0	0	15	25	3rd	
2012	Division 4 N&E	4	1	2	0	1	12	22	3rd	
2013	Division 4 N&E	4	1	2	0	1	15	25	3rd	
2014	Division 4 N&E	4	1	2	0	1	11	21	4th	
2015	Division 4 N&E	4	1	3	0	0	21	31	4th	
2016	Division 4 N&E	5	2	2	0	1	28	48	3rd	
2017	Division 3A	6	2	3	0	1	13	33	3rd	
2018	Division 3A	6	0	6	0	0	15	15	4th	
2019	Division 3A	6	0	5	0	1	13	8	7th	

=== Women's Twenty20 Cup ===
Season	Division	League standings								Notes
Season	Division	P	W	L	T	A/C	NRR	Pts	Pos	Notes
2009	Division 7	3	0	0	0	3	–	3	1st	
2010	Division M&N 3	2	1	1	0	0	−1.26	2	2nd	Lost promotion play-off
2011	Division M&N 3	3	1	2	0	0	−1.22	2	3rd	Relegated
2012	Division M&N 4	3	0	3	0	0	−3.02	0	4th	
2013	Division M&N 4	3	1	2	0	0	−0.69	2	3rd	
2014	Division 4C	4	1	3	0	0	−0.54	4	7th	
2015	Division 4C	6	0	3	0	3	−1.44	3	4th	
2016	Division 4C	6	3	3	0	0	+0.35	12	2nd	
2017	Division 3B	8	4	4	0	0	+0.28	16	4th	
2018	Division 3B	8	2	6	0	0	−1.53	8	5th	

== See also ==
- Northumberland County Cricket Club
- North East Warriors
- Northern Diamonds
