= Margaret Rutherford (cricketer) =

English cricketer

Personal information
- Full name: Sheila Margaret Rutherford
- Born: 15 June 1935 (age 91); Seghill, Northumberland, England
- Role: Bowler

International information
- National side: England (1960–1961)
- Test debut (cap 56): 2 December 1960 v South Africa
- Last Test: 13 January 1961 v South Africa

Domestic team information
- Years: Team
- 1964: Northumberland

Career statistics
Competition	WTest	WFC
Matches	4	10
Runs scored	7	38
Batting average	2.33	3.80
100s/50s	0/0	0/0
Top score	4	20
Balls bowled	822	1,590
Wickets	5	21
Bowling average	36.40	17.95
5 wickets in innings	0	0
10 wickets in match	0	0
Best bowling	2/13	4/11
Catches/stumpings	7/–	9/–
- Source: CricketArchive, 6 March 2021

Sheila Margaret Rutherford (born 15 June 1935) is an English former cricketer who played primarily as a bowler. She appeared in four Test matches for England in 1960 and 1961, all against South Africa. She played domestic cricket for various North of England composite XIs, as well as her home county of Northumberland.
