= 2011 Women's County Championship =

- Administrator(s): England and Wales Cricket Board
- Cricket format: 50 over
- Tournament format(s): League system
- Champions: Kent (4th title)
- Participants: 37
- Most runs: Charlotte Edwards (541)
- Most wickets: Jane Riddell (28)

The 2011 Women's County One-Day Championship was the 15th cricket Women's County Championship season. It ran from April to September and saw 33 county teams and teams representing Ireland, Scotland, Wales and the Netherlands compete in a series of divisions. Kent Women won the County Championship as winners of the top division, with Sussex finishing second. The Championship was Kent's fourth title, and their first of two titles in 2011, as they later won the 2011 Women's Twenty20 Cup.

== Competition format ==
Teams played matches within a series of divisions with the winners of the top division being crowned County Champions. Matches were played using a one day format with 50 overs per side.

The championship worked on a points system, with placings decided by average points of completed games. Due to restructuring ahead of the 2012 season, which had divisions of nine teams compared to six in 2011, there was no relegation and more teams were promoted per division. The points are awarded as follows:

Win: 10 points + bonus points.
Tie: 5 points + bonus points.
Loss: Bonus points.
Abandoned or cancelled: Match not counted to average.

Bonus points are awarded for various batting and bowling milestones. The bonus points for each match are retained if the match is completed.

- Batting

1.50 runs per over (RPO) or more: 1 point
2 RPO or more: 2 points
3 RPO or more: 3 points
4 RPO or more: 4 points

- Bowling

3-4 wickets taken: 1 point
5-6 wickets taken: 2 points
7-8 wickets taken: 3 points
9-10 wickets taken: 4 points

== Teams ==
The 2011 Championship was divided into five divisions: Divisions One to Four with six teams apiece and Division Five with 13 teams split across three regional groups.

Teams in each group played each other twice.

Division One	Berkshire	Kent	Middlesex	Nottinghamshire	Sussex	Yorkshire
Division Two	Cheshire	Essex	Somerset	Surrey	Wales	Warwickshire
Division Three	Devon	Lancashire	Netherlands	Scotland	Staffordshire	Worcestershire
Division Four	Cambridgeshire and Huntingdonshire	Derbyshire	Durham	Hampshire	Hertfordshire	Northamptonshire
Division Five East	Buckinghamshire	Leicestershire and Rutland	Norfolk	Suffolk		
Division Five North	Cumbria	Ireland	Northumberland	Shropshire		
Division Five South & West	Cornwall	Dorset	Gloucestershire	Oxfordshire	Wiltshire	

== Division One ==
Team	Pld	W	L	T	A	Bat	Bowl	Ded	Pts	Avg.
Kent (C)	10	7	1	0	2	30	26	0	126	15.75
Sussex	10	7	2	0	1	30	27	0	127	14.11
Middlesex	10	5	3	0	2	25	20	0	95	11.88
Yorkshire	10	4	4	0	2	17	17	0	74	9.25
Berkshire	10	2	6	0	2	21	14	0	55	6.88
Nottinghamshire	10	0	9	0	1	21	13	0	34	3.78

Source: ECB Women's County Championship

== Division Two ==
Team	Pld	W	L	T	A	Bat	Bowl	Ded	Pts	Avg.
Essex (P)	10	7	2	0	1	30	31	0	131	14.56
Surrey (P)	10	6	3	0	1	31	28	0	119	13.22
Somerset (P)	10	5	3	0	2	25	27	0	102	12.75
Warwickshire	10	5	3	0	2	26	25	0	101	12.63
Cheshire	10	3	6	0	1	17	30	0	77	8.56
Wales	10	0	9	0	1	18	13	0	31	3.44

Source: ECB Women's County Championship

== Division Three ==
Team	Pld	W	L	T	A	Bat	Bowl	Ded	Pts	Avg.
Netherlands (P)	5	5	0	0	0	19	17	0	86	17.20
Staffordshire (P)	9	7	1	0	1	21	25	0	116	14.50
Devon (P)	9	3	4	0	2	20	24	0	74	10.57
Worcestershire (P)	9	3	5	1	0	28	29	0	92	10.22
Lancashire (P)	9	3	5	1	0	19	24	0	78	8.67
Scotland	9	1	7	0	1	21	22	0	53	6.63

Source: ECB Women's County Championship

== Division Four ==
Team	Pld	W	L	T	A	Bat	Bowl	Ded	Pts	Avg.
Durham (P)	10	7	2	0	1	27	34	0	131	14.56
Hertfordshire	10	6	3	0	1	22	31	0	113	12.56
Hampshire	10	5	3	0	2	25	24	0	99	12.38
Northamptonshire	10	4	5	0	1	24	26	0	90	10.00
Derbyshire	10	3	5	0	1	22	28	0	80	10.00
Cambridgeshire and Huntingdonshire	10	1	8	0	1	26	21	0	57	6.33

Source: ECB Women's County Championship

== Division Five ==
=== East ===
Team	Pld	W	L	T	A	Bat	Bowl	Ded	Pts	Avg.
Leicestershire and Rutland (PO)	5	5	0	0	0	18	19	0	87	17.40
Suffolk	5	2	3	0	0	11	16	0	47	9.40
Buckinghamshire	5	2	3	0	0	12	14	0	46	9.20
Norfolk	5	1	4	0	0	12	15	0	37	7.40

Source: ECB Women's County Championship

=== North ===
Team	Pld	W	L	T	A	Bat	Bowl	Ded	Pts	Avg.
Ireland (PO)	3	2	0	0	1	8	8	0	36	18.00
Shropshire	5	3	0	0	2	7	8	0	45	15.00
Northumberland	5	1	3	0	1	8	7	0	25	6.25
Cumbria	5	1	4	0	0	10	9	5	24	4.80

Source: ECB Women's County Championship

=== South & West ===
Team	Pld	W	L	T	A	Bat	Bowl	Ded	Pts	Avg.
Gloucestershire (PO)	8	6	0	0	2	23	23	0	106	17.67
Dorset	8	3	2	0	3	11	16	0	57	11.40
Oxfordshire	8	3	4	0	1	18	24	0	72	10.29
Cornwall	8	3	3	0	2	9	19	0	58	9.67
Wiltshire	8	0	6	0	2	7	17	0	24	4.00

Source: ECB Women's County Championship

=== Play-offs ===
Team	Pld	W	L	T	A	Bat	Bowl	Ded	Pts	Avg.
Ireland (P)	2	2	0	0	0	8	8	0	36	18.00
Leicestershire and Rutland	2	1	1	0	0	3	4	0	17	8.50
Gloucestershire	2	0	2	0	0	5	6	0	11	5.50

Source: ECB Women's County Championship

== Statistics ==
=== Most runs ===
Player	Team	Matches	Innings	Runs	Average	HS	100s	50s
Charlotte Edwards	Kent	10	9	541	135.25	105	1	5
Ebony Rainford-Brent	Surrey	9	9	471	58.87	154*	1	3
Jenny Dunn	Middlesex	8	8	457	57.12	125	1	4
Megan Burton	Oxfordshire	6	6	387	129.00	105*	2	2
Caroline Atkins	Sussex	10	8	380	126.66	82*	0	5

Source: CricketArchive

=== Most wickets ===
Player	Team	Balls	Wickets	Average	BBI	5w
Jane Riddell	Durham	534	28	8.89	5/26	1
Holly Colvin	Sussex	448	19	7.84	5/3	1
Kate Randall	Somerset	410	18	12.00	6/33	1
Farida Bibi	Cambridgeshire and Huntingdonshire	494	18	15.66	5/29	1
Sian Ruck	Essex	349	17	10.47	4/26	0

Source: CricketArchive
