= Shropshire Women cricket team =

English county cricket team

Shropshire Women

Personnel
- Captain: Lara Jones

Team information
- Founded: Unknown First recorded match: 2008
- Home ground: Various

History
- WCC wins: 0
- T20 Cup wins: 0
- Official website: Cricket Shropshire

The Shropshire Women's cricket team is the women's representative cricket team for the English historic county of Shropshire. They play their home games at various grounds across the county, including Ellesmere College Ground, Ellesmere and are captained by Lara Jones. Shropshire withdrew from the Women's County Championship after the 2018 season, have since competed in the Women's Twenty20 Cup. They are partnered with the West Midlands regional side Central Sparks.

== History ==
Shropshire Women joined the Women's County Championship in 2008, finishing bottom of Division 5 Midlands in their first season. Shropshire went on to consistently play in the bottom tiers of the Championship, but did win Division 4 South & West in 2016. Shropshire bowlers Bethan Ellis and Zoe Griffiths were the joint-second highest wicket-takers in the division. Shropshire did not compete in the final season of the Women's County Championship, 2019.

Shropshire have also competed in the Women's Twenty20 Cup, from 2009 to 2010 and from 2014 onwards. Their most successful season was in 2015, when they topped Division 4C and then gained promotion to Division 3 in a play-off group, winning a crucial game against Leicestershire by just three runs. Shropshire played in Division Three of the competition until the format changed after the 2019 season. In 2021, they competed in the East Midlands Group of the Twenty20 Cup, finishing 3rd with 2 victories. They finished bottom of their group in the 2022 Women's Twenty20 Cup. In the 2023 Women's Twenty20 Cup, the side reached their group final, but lost to Gloucestershire. In 2024, the side finished 3rd in their group in the Twenty20 Cup and 5th in their group in the new ECB Women's County One-Day tournament.

== Players ==
=== Current squad ===
Based on appearances in the 2023 season.

Name	Nationality	Apps	Notes				
Name	Nationality	Apps	Notes	Lara Jones	England	4	Club captain
Caitlin Belcher	England	4					
Katie Brazier	England	4					
Sophie Buckton	England	2					
Beth Charnell	England	4					
Sophie Grayson	England	1					
Amy Griffiths	England	4					
Lauren Kenvyn	England	4					
Robyn Mathews	England	2	Wicket-keeper				
Emily Perrin	England	4					
Ellie Phillips	England	1					
Harriet Shuker	England	2					
Megan Trickett	England	2					
Amy Weir	England	2					
Holly Whitfield	England	4					

== Seasons ==
=== Women's County Championship ===
Season	Division	League standings								Notes
Season	Division	P	W	L	T	A/C	BP	Pts	Pos	Notes
2008	Division 5M	3	0	2	1	0	0	16	4th	
2009	Division 5 S&W	5	3	2	0	0	8	68	3rd	
2010	Division 5N	7	3	4	0	0	30	60	4th	
2011	Division 5N	5	3	0	0	2	15	45	2nd	
2012	Division 4 S&W	4	2	1	0	1	19	39	2nd	
2013	Division 4 S&W	4	2	2	0	0	18	38	3rd	
2014	Division 4 S&W	4	3	1	0	0	28	58	2nd	
2015	Division 4 S&W	5	3	1	0	1	28	58	2nd	
2016	Division 4 S&W	4	3	0	0	1	22	52	1st	
2017	Division 3C	5	3	2	0	0	32	62	3rd	
2018	Division 3E	6	0	5	0	1	18	18	4th	

=== Women's Twenty20 Cup ===
Season	Division	League standings								Notes
Season	Division	P	W	L	T	A/C	NRR	Pts	Pos	Notes
2009	Division 7	3	0	0	0	3	−	3	1st	
2010	Division S2	3	0	3	0	0	−2.26	0	4th	
2014	Division 4A	4	0	4	0	0	−1.19	0	9th	
2015	Division 4C	6	3	0	0	3	+2.15	15	1st	Promoted
2016	Division 3	8	0	8	0	0	−1.53	0	9th	
2017	Division 3B	8	4	3	0	1	−0.44	17	3rd	
2018	Division 3B	8	2	6	0	0	−0.80	8	4th	
2019	Division 3C	8	0	5	1	2	−2.07	4	4th	
2021	East Midlands	8	2	2	0	4	−0.02	12	3rd	
2022	Group 2	6	0	6	0	0	−1.97	0	4th	
2023	Group 3	6	0	1	0	5	−0.67	5	3rd	Lost final
2024	Group 2	8	4	0	0	4	+2.47	81	3rd	

=== ECB Women's County One-Day ===
Season	Group	League standings								Notes
Season	Group	P	W	L	T	A/C	BP	Pts	Pos	Notes
2024	Group 1	4	2	2	0	0	1	9	5th	

== See also ==
- Shropshire County Cricket Club
- Central Sparks
