= Oxfordshire Women cricket team =

English county cricket team

Oxfordshire Women

Personnel
- Captain: Emilia Bartram
- Coach: Ed Wilson and George Setterfield

Team information
- Founded: Unknown First recorded match: 1948
- Home ground: Akeman Street, Chesterton

History
- WCC wins: 0
- T20 Cup wins: 0
- Official website: Oxfordshire Cricket

The Oxfordshire Women's cricket team is the women's representative cricket team for the English historic county of Oxfordshire. They play their home games at Akeman Street, Chesterton and are captained by Abi Currie. In 2019, they played in Division Three of the final season of the Women's County Championship, and have since competed in the Women's Twenty20 Cup. They are partnered with the regional side Southern Vipers.

== History ==
Oxfordshire Women played their first recorded match in 1948, against Buckinghamshire Women. They went on to play various one-off matches, often as a combined team with Berkshire, including games against touring Netherlands and Australia sides.

Oxfordshire joined the national county structure in 2007, competing in the County Challenge Cup, finishing bottom of their group in their first season. In the first season of the Women's Twenty20 Cup, in 2009, Oxfordshire won Division Eight with three wins from three games. They went on to become a regular Division Three side, and finished second in their group in every season between 2017 and 2019. In 2021, they competed in the South West Group of the Twenty20 Cup, and finished 5th with 2 victories. They finished second in their group of the 2022 Women's Twenty20 Cup. Oxfordshire bowler Chloe Westbury was the joint-second leading wicket-taker in the competition, with 13 wickets.

Oxfordshire gained promotion from Division Four of the Championship in 2012, and played in Division Three since then. Their most successful seasons came in the final years of the competition: finishing second in 2017 before topping Division 3C in both 2018 and 2019. In 2018, they lost a promotion play-off against Durham by 85 runs, whereas in 2019 there was no promotion as it was the final season of the County Championship.

In 2022, Oxfordshire joined the South Central Counties Cup, finishing second out of six teams in the inaugural edition. In 2024, the side finished 3rd in their group in the Twenty20 Cup and 8th in their group in the new ECB Women's County One-Day tournament.

== Players ==
=== Current squad ===
Based on appearances in the 2023 season. ‡ denotes players with international caps.

Name	Nationality	2023 Appearances		Notes
Name	Nationality	WT20	SCCC	Notes
Abi Currie	England	6	4	Club captain; wicket-keeper
Emilia Bartram ‡	Italy	5	4	
Eleanor Bath	England	4	0	
Aimee Diab	England	5	4	
Sophia Hanson	England	1	0	
Georgia Haworth	England	0	3	
Eleanor Ingram	England	6	4	Wicket-keeper
Laura Jacob	England	4	1	
Lucy Johnson	England	1	0	
Isobel Kirby	England	5	2	
Bethan Lewis	England	1	0	
Honor Murray	England	1	5	
Abi Norgrove	England	4	3	
Genevieve Porter	England	7	5	
Georgia Prestedge	England	1	3	
Numa Shah	England	4	0	
Kitty Spurgeon	England	0	2	
Zoe Soonawalla	England	1	1	
Finty Trussler	England	0	5	Dual-registration with Hampshire
Katie Waugh	England	5	5	Wicket-keeper
Chloe Westbury	England	7	5	
Carla Wood	England	6	4	
Rebecca Woodnorth	England	3	0	

=== Notable players ===
Players who have played for Oxfordshire and played internationally are listed below, in order of first international appearance (given in brackets):

- (New Zealand) Lauren Down (2018)
- (Italy) Emilia Bartram (2022)

== Seasons ==
=== Women's County Championship ===
Season	Division	League standings								Notes
Season	Division	P	W	L	T	A/C	BP	Pts	Pos	Notes
2007	County Challenge Cup G2	3	0	2	0	1	4	14	4th	
2008	Division 5 S&W	4	0	4	0	0	5	5	5th	
2009	Division 5 S&W	5	2	3	0	0	8	48	4th	
2010	Division 5E	6	2	4	0	0	27	47	3rd	
2011	Division 5 S&W	8	3	4	0	1	42	72	3rd	
2012	Division 4 S&W	4	3	0	0	1	20	50	1st	Promoted
2013	Division 3	8	0	7	0	1	31	31	9th	
2014	Division 3	8	2	5	1	0	40	65	6th	
2015	Division 3	8	3	2	1	2	34	69	4th	
2016	Division 3	8	3	4	0	1	43	73	5th	
2017	Division 3B	4	3	1	0	0	28	58	2nd	
2018	Division 3C	6	5	1	0	0	43	93	1st	Lost promotion playoff
2019	Division 3C	5	5	0	0	0	40	90	1st	

=== Women's Twenty20 Cup ===
Season	Division	League standings								Notes
Season	Division	P	W	L	T	A/C	NRR	Pts	Pos	Notes
2009	Division 8	3	3	0	0	0	+0.65	6	1st	
2010	Division M&N 4	2	0	1	1	0	−2.47	1	3rd	
2011	Division M&N 4	3	0	3	0	0	−5.30	0	4th	
2012	Division M&N 4	3	2	1	0	0	+0.47	4	3rd	
2013	Division M&N 4	3	1	2	0	0	−0.72	2	4th	
2014	Division 3A	4	0	4	0	0	−1.72	0	7th	
2015	Division 3	8	2	6	0	0	−1.51	8	7th	
2016	Division 3	8	3	4	0	1	−0.14	13	5th	
2017	Division 3A	8	5	1	0	2	+1.29	22	2nd	
2018	Division 3A	8	5	3	0	0	+0.57	20	2nd	
2019	Division 3A	8	6	2	0	0	+0.05	24	2nd	
2021	South West	8	2	2	0	4	–0.10	12	5th	
2022	Group 5	6	4	2	0	0	+0.29	16	2nd	
2023	Group 6	6	0	6	0	0	–2.13	0	4th	
2024	Group 4	8	4	4	0	0	+0.47	84	3rd	

=== ECB Women's County One-Day ===
Season	Group	League standings								Notes
Season	Group	P	W	L	T	A/C	BP	Pts	Pos	Notes
2024	Group 3	4	1	2	0	1	0	5	8th	

== See also ==
- Oxfordshire County Cricket Club
- Southern Vipers
