= Wiltshire Women cricket team =

English county cricket team

Wiltshire Women

Personnel
- Captain: Isla Thomson
- Coach: Sam Dent & Aled Evans

Team information
- Founded: Unknown First recorded match: 2000
- Home ground: Various including Trowbridge Cricket Club Ground

History
- WCC wins: 0
- T20 Cup wins: 0
- Official website: Wiltshire Cricket

The Wiltshire Women's cricket team is the women's representative cricket team for the English historic county of Wiltshire. They play their home games at various grounds across the county and are captained by Isla Thomson. In 2019, they played in Division Three of the last season of the Women's County Championship, and have since competed in the Women's Twenty20 Cup. They are partnered with the regional side Western Storm.

== History ==
Wiltshire played their first recorded match in 2000, and joined the Women's County Championship a year later. In their first season, they finished 5th in Division 3, losing all four of their matches, and they were relegated a season later in 2002. After this, Wiltshire played in the Emerging Counties and County Challenge competitions, the tier below the County Championship, until 2008 when they joined Division 5. Since then, Wiltshire have played in the lowest division of the Championship, with their best finishes coming in 2010 and 2013 when they finished 2nd in their division.

Wiltshire have also competed in the Women's Twenty20 Cup since it began in 2009. When the tournament was regionalised, the side was successful in Division 2 South & West, winning the group in 2010 and beating Buckinghamshire in the Division Final in 2011. Since the national structure of the tournament was implemented in 2015, Wiltshire have played in the bottom tier of the competition, achieving their best finish, 2nd in Division 4B, in 2016. In 2021, they competed in the South West Group of the Twenty20 Cup, but finished bottom. They finished third in their group in the 2022 Women's Twenty20 Cup, with two wins. They finished second in the group in the 2023 Women's Twenty20 Cup, but lost in the group semi-final. In 2024, the side finished 7th in their group in the Twenty20 Cup and 6th in their group in the new ECB Women's County One-Day tournament.

== Players ==
=== Current squad ===
Based on appearances in the 2023 season.

| Name | Nationality | Apps | Notes | | | | |
|---|---|---|---|---|---|---|---|
| Name | Nationality | Apps | Notes | Isla Thomson | England | 3 | Club captain |
| Maxine Blythin | England | 3 | | | | | |
| Emily Bogg | England | 3 | Wicket-keeper | | | | |
| Katy Cobb | England | 2 | | | | | |
| Jenny Heppell | England | 3 | | | | | |
| Thea Hopkins | England | 2 | | | | | |
| Holly Morgan | England | 1 | | | | | |
| Florence Sharman | England | 3 | | | | | |
| Anna-Mae Shearn | England | 1 | | | | | |
| Lauren Shrubsole | England | 3 | | | | | |
| Emily Smith | England | 3 | | | | | |
| Victoria Stone | England | 4 | | | | | |
| Poppy Walker | England | 3 | | | | | |
| Lois Wright | England | 3 | | | | | |

=== Notable players ===
Players who have played for Wiltshire and played internationally are listed below, in order of first international appearance (given in brackets):

- (England) Janet Godman (1991)
- (Australia) Lisa Keightley (1995)

== Seasons ==
=== Women's County Championship ===
| Season | Division | League standings | | | | | | | | Notes |
| Season | Division | P | W | L | T | A/C | BP | Pts | Pos | Notes |
|---|---|---|---|---|---|---|---|---|---|---|
| 2001 | Division 3 | 4 | 0 | 4 | 0 | 0 | 17.5 | 17.5 | 5th | |
| 2002 | Division 3 | 5 | 0 | 3 | 0 | 2 | 14 | 36 | 6th | Relegated |
| 2003 | Emerging Counties | 2 | 1 | 1 | 0 | 0 | 13 | 25 | 2nd | |
| 2004 | County Challenge Cup G3 | 3 | 0 | 3 | 0 | 0 | 14 | 14 | 4th | |
| 2005 | County Challenge Cup G4 | 3 | 1 | 2 | 0 | 0 | 17 | 29 | 3rd | |
| 2006 | County Challenge Cup G3 | 3 | 0 | 3 | 0 | 0 | 0 | 0 | 4th | |
| 2007 | County Challenge Cup G1 | 3 | 0 | 3 | 0 | 0 | 3 | 3 | 4th | |
| 2008 | Division 5 L&E | 3 | 1 | 2 | 0 | 0 | 2 | 22 | 3rd | |
| 2009 | Division 5 S&W | 5 | 0 | 4 | 0 | 1 | 7 | 12 | 6th | |
| 2010 | Division 5 S&W | 6 | 4 | 2 | 0 | 0 | 37 | 77 | 2nd | |
| 2011 | Division 5 S&W | 8 | 0 | 6 | 0 | 2 | 24 | 24 | 5th | |
| 2012 | Division 4 S&W | 4 | 0 | 2 | 0 | 2 | 8 | 8 | 5th | |
| 2013 | Division 4 S&W | 4 | 2 | 2 | 0 | 0 | 25 | 45 | 2nd | |
| 2014 | Division 4 S&W | 4 | 1 | 3 | 0 | 0 | 19 | 29 | 4th | |
| 2015 | Division 4 S&W | 5 | 1 | 2 | 0 | 2 | 12 | 22 | 4th | |
| 2016 | Division 4 S&W | 4 | 1 | 2 | 0 | 1 | 13 | 23 | 4th | |
| 2017 | Division 3B | 4 | 0 | 3 | 1 | 0 | 15 | 20 | 5th | |
| 2018 | Division 3B | 6 | 1 | 5 | 0 | 0 | 18 | 28 | 3rd | |
| 2019 | Division 3C | 5 | 0 | 5 | 0 | 0 | 14 | 14 | 6th | |

=== Women's Twenty20 Cup ===
| Season | Division | League standings | | | | | | | | Notes |
| Season | Division | P | W | L | T | A/C | NRR | Pts | Pos | Notes |
|---|---|---|---|---|---|---|---|---|---|---|
| 2009 | Division 6 | 3 | 0 | 0 | 0 | 3 | − | 3 | 1st | |
| 2010 | Division S&W 2 | 3 | 3 | 0 | 0 | 0 | +2.29 | 6 | 1st | |
| 2011 | Division S&W 2 | 3 | 2 | 1 | 0 | 0 | +0.35 | 4 | 2nd | |
| 2012 | Division S&W 2 | 3 | 1 | 2 | 0 | 0 | −1.02 | 2 | 3rd | |
| 2013 | Division S&W 2 | 3 | 0 | 3 | 0 | 0 | −2.55 | 0 | 4th | |
| 2014 | Division 4D | 4 | 0 | 4 | 0 | 0 | −1.74 | 0 | 12th | |
| 2015 | Division 4B | 6 | 1 | 5 | 0 | 0 | −0.87 | 4 | 3rd | |
| 2016 | Division 4B | 6 | 2 | 2 | 0 | 2 | −0.30 | 10 | 2nd | |
| 2017 | Division 3A | 8 | 1 | 7 | 0 | 0 | −1.94 | 4 | 6th | |
| 2018 | Division 3A | 8 | 0 | 8 | 0 | 0 | −3.16 | 0 | 6th | |
| 2019 | Division 3A | 8 | 0 | 6 | 0 | 2 | −1.48 | 2 | 6th | |
| 2021 | South West | 8 | 0 | 8 | 0 | 0 | −3.83 | 0 | 6th | |
| 2022 | Group 8 | 6 | 2 | 4 | 0 | 0 | −0.31 | 0 | 3rd | |
| 2023 | Group 3 | 6 | 2 | 0 | 0 | 4 | +2.21 | 12 | 2nd | |
| 2024 | Group 4 | 8 | 2 | 4 | 0 | 2 | –0.65 | 50 | 7th | |

=== ECB Women's County One-Day ===
| Season | Group | League standings | | | | | | | | Notes |
| Season | Group | P | W | L | T | A/C | BP | Pts | Pos | Notes |
|---|---|---|---|---|---|---|---|---|---|---|
| 2024 | Group 3 | 4 | 1 | 2 | 0 | 1 | 1 | 6 | 6th | |

== See also ==
- Wiltshire County Cricket Club
- Western Storm
