= 2016 Women's County Championship =

- Administrator: England and Wales Cricket Board
- Cricket format: 50 over
- Tournament format: League system
- Champions: Kent
- Participants: 37
- Most runs: Kirstie White (337)
- Most wickets: Samantha Betts (18)

The 2016 Women's County One-Day Championship was the 20th cricket Women's County Championship season. The Championship was won by Kent who recorded their seventh championship, setting a new record for the number of championships won. The runners-up were Sussex.

This was the last season in which Division 4 was contested. Following a reorganisation of the structure of the tournament, all the teams in Division 4 were promoted to an expanded Division 3 in 2017. In early 2016, Ireland team withdrew from the competition, causing fixtures to be rescheduled and Division 2 with one fewer team.

== Competition format ==
The championship worked on a points system, the winner being the team with most average points of completed games in the first division. The points are awarded as follows:

Win: 10 points + bonus points.
Tie: 5 points + bonus points.
Loss: Bonus points.
Abandoned or cancelled: Match not counted to average.

Bonus points are collected for batting and bowling. The bonus points for each match are retained if the match is completed.

- Batting

1.50 runs per over (RPO) or more: 1 point
2 RPO or more: 2 points
3 RPO or more: 3 points
4 RPO or more: 4 points

- Bowling

3-4 wickets taken: 1 point
5-6 wickets taken: 2 points
7-8 wickets taken: 3 points
9-10 wickets taken: 4 points

== Teams ==
The 2016 Championship was divided into four divisions: Division One with nine teams, Division Two with eight teams due to Ireland withdrawing, Division Three with nine teams, and Division Four with eleven teams across two groups.

Teams in each group played each other once.

Division One	Berkshire	Kent	Middlesex	Somerset	Staffordshire	Surrey	Sussex	Warwickshire	Yorkshire
Division Two	Devon	Essex	Hampshire	Lancashire	Leicestershire and Rutland	Nottinghamshire	Wales	Worcestershire	
Division Three	Cheshire	Derbyshire	Durham	Gloucestershire	Netherlands	Norfolk	Northamptonshire	Oxfordshire	Scotland
Division Four North & East	Cambridgeshire	Cumbria	Hertfordshire	Lincolnshire	Northumberland	Suffolk			
Division Four South & West	Buckinghamshire	Cornwall	Dorset	Shropshire	Wiltshire				

== Division One ==
Team	Pld	W	L	T	A	Bat	Bowl	Ded	Pts	Avg.
Kent (C)	8	7	1	0	0	31	32	0	133	16.63
Sussex	8	4	2	0	2	22	19	0	81	13.50
Warwickshire	8	4	2	0	2	18	22	0	80	13.33
Yorkshire	8	4	2	0	2	16	18	0	74	12.33
Berkshire	8	3	4	0	1	21	26	0	77	11.00
Middlesex	8	4	3	0	1	19	17	0	76	10.86
Somerset (R)	8	2	5	0	1	11	18	0	49	7.00
Surrey (R)	8	1	7	0	0	21	22	0	53	6.63
Staffordshire (R)	8	1	4	0	3	11	9	0	30	6.00

As of 17 September 2016 — Source: ECB Women's County Championship

== Division Two ==
Team	Pld	W	L	T	A	Bat	Bowl	Ded	Pts	Avg.
Lancashire (P)	7	4	1	0	2	15	20	0	75	15.00
Nottinghamshire (P)	7	5	1	0	1	20	18	0	88	14.67
Hampshire	7	5	2	0	0	19	26	0	95	13.57
Devon	7	4	3	0	0	22	22	0	84	12.00
Wales	7	3	2	0	2	13	17	0	60	12.00
Worcestershire	7	2	4	0	1	16	16	0	52	8.67
Leicestershire and Rutland (R)	7	1	4	0	2	11	13	0	34	6.80
Essex (R)	7	0	7	0	0	15	17	0	32	4.57

As of 4 September 2016 — Source: ECB Women's County Championship

== Division Three ==
Team	Pld	W	L	T	A	Bat	Bowl	Ded	Pts	Avg.
Derbyshire (P)	8	6	0	0	2	23	22	0	105	17.50
Durham	8	6	1	0	1	19	23	0	102	14.57
Gloucestershire	8	5	1	0	2	17	20	0	87	14.50
Northamptonshire	8	3	2	0	3	13	14	0	57	11.40
Oxfordshire	8	3	4	0	1	20	23	0	73	10.43
Netherlands	8	3	4	0	1	22	20	0	72	10.29
Scotland	8	3	4	0	1	19	20	0	69	9.86
Cheshire	8	1	6	0	1	14	10	0	34	4.86
Norfolk	8	0	8	0	0	14	3	0	27	3.38

As of 4 September 2016 — Source: ECB Women's County Championship

== Division Four ==
=== North & East ===
Team	Pld	W	L	T	A	Bat	Bowl	Ded	Pts	Avg.
Hertfordshire	5	4	0	0	1	13	16	0	69	17.25
Suffolk	5	3	1	0	1	10	15	0	55	13.75
Northumberland	5	2	2	0	1	14	14	0	48	12.00
Lincolnshire	5	2	2	0	1	11	10	0	41	10.25
Cumbria	5	1	2	0	2	8	10	0	28	9.33
Cambridgeshire	5	0	5	0	0	11	12	0	23	4.60

As of 28 August 2016 — Source: ECB Women's County Championship

=== South & West ===
Team	Pld	W	L	T	A	Bat	Bowl	Ded	Pts	Avg.
Shropshire	4	3	0	0	1	10	12	0	52	17.33
Cornwall	4	1	1	0	2	2	7	0	19	9.50
Dorset	4	1	2	0	1	7	9	0	26	8.67
Wiltshire	4	1	2	0	1	8	5	0	23	7.67
Buckinghamshire	4	1	2	0	1	6	6	0	22	7.33

As of 4 September 2016 — Source: ECB Women's County Championship

== Statistics ==
=== Most runs ===
Player	Team	Matches	Innings	Runs	Average	HS	100s	50s
Kirstie White	Surrey	8	8	337	48.14	98*	0	3
Aylish Cranstone	Devon	7	7	327	54.50	134*	1	1
Heather Knight	Berkshire	7	7	308	44.00	92	0	4
Tammy Beaumont	Kent	8	8	292	41.71	72	0	2
Miranda Veringmeier	Netherlands	8	7	275	39.28	104	1	2

Source: CricketArchive

=== Most wickets ===
Player	Team	Balls	Wickets	Average	BBI	5w
Samantha Betts	Hampshire	343	18	8.00	5/20	2
Megan Belt	Kent	290	16	7.93	5/8	1
Georgia Elwiss	Sussex	285	15	10.33	6/17	2
Tash Farrant	Kent	300	15	10.80	6/16	1
Charlotte Pape	Kent	223	14	7.07	3/9	0

Source: CricketArchive
