= Devon Women cricket team =

English County Cricket team

Devon Women

Personnel
- Captain: Steph Hutchins
- Coach: Lauren Rowles

Team information
- Founded: Unknown First recorded match: 1967
- Home ground: The Holt, Budleigh Salterton

History
- WCC wins: 0
- T20 Cup wins: 0
- Official website: Devon Cricket

The Devon Women's cricket team is the women's representative cricket team for the English historic county of Devon. They play their home games at The Holt in Budleigh Salterton. They are captained by Steph Hutchins. In 2025 they competed in Division 1 of League Three as part of the newly restructured women's game in England and Wales, having been unsuccessful in their bid to attain Tier 2 status.

== History ==
Devon Women joined the County Challenge Cup in 2005, finishing 2nd in their group in their first season. In 2008, their first season in the Women's County Championship proper, they were promoted from Division 5 South & West, winning all four of their games. After being promoted to Division 2 in 2011, they have remained there ever since, achieving their best finish of 3rd in 2012, 2014 and 2017, helped by standout performances from players such as Rosalie Birch, Jodie Dibble and Caitlin O'Keefe. Devon joined the Women's Twenty20 Cup in its inaugural season, 2009, winning Division 4 with two out of three wins that year. From 2015, when the competition first moved to a national format, until 2018, Devon played in Division 3: they were promoted in 2018, topping Division 3A, and played in Division 2 in 2019. In 2021, they competed in the South West Group of the Twenty20 Cup, finishing 2nd with 4 wins. In 2022, they won Group 8 of the Twenty20 Cup, topping the group before emerging victorious on Finals Day, beating Cornwall in the final. After all of their group stage matches were rained-off in the 2023 Women's Twenty20 Cup, the side lost in the group semi-final. In 2024, the side finished 5th in their group in the Twenty20 Cup and won their group in the new ECB Women's County One-Day tournament, winning all four of their matches.

== Players ==
=== Current squad ===
Based on appearances in the 2026 season and official squad page.
- No. denotes the player's squad number, as worn on the back of their shirt.
- ‡ denotes players with international caps.

No.	Name	Nationality	Birth date	Batting style	Bowling style	Notes
Batters
5	Jemima Vereker	England	27 December 2004 (age 21)	Right-handed	Unknown	
7	Charlotte Taylor	England	Unknown	Right-handed	Unknown	
8	Ella Gill	England	Unknown	Right-handed	Right-arm off break	
20	Amelie Munday	England	9 October 2002 (age 23)	Right-handed	Unknown	
22	Elle Golsworthy	England	Unknown	Right-handed	Unknown	
25	Hollie Perkin	England	20 November 2003 (age 22)	Unknown	Right-arm medium	
31	Gemma Lancaster	England	31 March 1997 (age 29)	Right-handed	Right-arm medium	
N/A	Megan Hayward	England	Unknown	Right-handed	Unknown	
N/A	Jessica Breban	England	Unknown	Right-handed	Unknown	
All-rounders
13	Ellie Bishop	England	13 September 2004 (age 21)	Right-handed	Right-arm off break	
27	Regina Lili'i ‡	Samoa	3 October 1986 (age 39)	Right-handed	Right-arm medium	
Wicket-keepers
3	Georgia Read	England	28 November 2002 (age 23)	Right-handed	–	
9	Megan Snape	England	Unknown	Right-handed	–	
N/A	Emma Phillipson	England	Unknown	Right-handed	–	
Bowlers
6	Imogen Daldorph	England	6 October 2005 (age 20)	Right-handed	Right-arm medium	
11	Maddie Russell	England	Unknown	Unknown	Left-arm medium	
16	JoJo Baylis	England	1 July 2001 (age 24)	Right-handed	Right-arm medium	
17	Steph Hutchins	England	6 October 1998 (age 27)	Right-handed	Right-arm off break	Club captain
29	Abbie Lockett	England	Unknown	Right-handed	Right-arm medium	
41	Katie Harman	England	Unknown	Right-handed	Right-arm medium	
88	Katie Donovan ‡	Philippines	23 January 2004 (age 22)	Left-handed	Right-arm medium	
N/A	Naomi Hillman-Bermejo ‡	Spain	7 September 2006 (age 19)	Unknown	Right-arm leg break	
N/A	Esther Woolley	England	Unknown	Unknown	Right-arm medium	

=== Notable players ===
Players who have played for Devon and played internationally are listed below, in order of first international appearance (given in brackets):

- (New Zealand) Aimee Watkins (2002)
- (England) Rosalie Birch (2003)
- (South Africa) Olivia Anderson (2008)
- (England) Heather Knight (2010)
- (New Zealand) Felicity Leydon-Davis (2014)
- (England) Jodie Cook (2014)
- (Samoa) Regina Lili'i (2019)
- (Spain) Naomi Hillman-Bermejo (2022)
- (Croatia) Erin Vukusic (2024)
- (Philippines) Katie Donovan (2024)

== Seasons ==
=== Women's County Championship ===
Season	Division	League standings								Notes
Season	Division	P	W	L	T	A/C	BP	Pts	Pos	Notes
2005	County Challenge Cup G4	3	2	1	0	0	22.5	46.5	2nd	
2006	County Challenge Cup G4	3	1	2	0	0	7	27	3rd	
2007	County Challenge Cup G1	3	2	0	0	1	3	63	1st	Lost promotion playoff
2008	Division 5 S&W	4	4	0	0	0	0	80	1st	Promoted
2009	Division 3	10	7	2	0	1	5	150	2nd	
2010	Division 3	10	7	3	0	0	55	125	4th	
2011	Division 3	9	3	4	0	2	44	74	3rd	Promoted
2012	Division 2	8	4	3	0	1	44	84	3rd	
2013	Division 2	8	1	6	0	1	32	42	8th	
2014	Division 2	8	5	2	0	1	40	90	3rd	
2015	Division 2	8	3	5	0	0	45	75	7th	
2016	Division 2	7	4	3	0	0	44	84	4th	
2017	Division 2	7	5	2	0	0	46	96	3rd	
2018	Division 2	7	3	4	0	0	44	74	4th	
2019	Division 2	7	4	2	0	1	39	84	4th	
2024	Group 3	4	4	0	0	0	4	20	1st	

=== Women's Twenty20 Cup ===
Season	Division	League standings								Notes
Season	Division	P	W	L	T	A/C	NRR	Pts	Pos	Notes
2009	Division 4	3	2	1	0	0	+1.03	4	1st	
2010	Division S&W 1	3	0	3	0	0	−1.80	0	4th	
2011	Division S&W 1	3	2	1	0	0	+0.08	4	2nd	
2012	Division S&W 1	3	0	3	0	0	−3.04	0	4th	Relegated
2013	Division S&W 2	3	3	0	0	0	+4.92	6	1st	
2014	Division 2C	4	1	3	0	0	−1.36	4	8th	Relegated
2015	Division 3	8	6	2	0	0	+2.55	24	3rd	
2016	Division 3	8	6	2	0	0	+1.99	24	3rd	
2017	Division 3A	8	4	2	0	2	+1.55	18	3rd	
2018	Division 3A	8	8	0	0	0	+4.09	32	1st	Promoted
2019	Division 2	8	3	3	0	2	−0.36	14	7th	
2021	South West	8	4	2	0	2	+2.96	18	2nd	
2022	Group 8	6	5	0	0	1	+1.41	21	1st	Group winners
2023	Group 8	6	0	0	0	6	+0.00	6	2nd	
2024	Group 4	8	4	2	0	2	+0.67	72	5th	

=== ECB Women's County One-Day ===
Season	Group	League standings								Notes
Season	Group	P	W	L	T	A/C	BP	Pts	Pos	Notes
2024	Group 3	4	4	0	0	0	4	20	1st	Group winners
2025	League 3 Division 1	7	5	0	0	2	3	27	1st	Group winners

== Honours ==
- Women's Twenty20 Cup:
  - Group winners (1) – 2022
- ECB Women's County One-Day:
  - Group winners (1) – 2024

== See also ==
- Devon County Cricket Club
- Western Storm
