= 2016 Women's Twenty20 Cup =

- Administrator(s): England and Wales Cricket Board
- Cricket format: Twenty20
- Tournament format(s): League system
- Champions: Kent (3rd title)
- Participants: 36
- Most runs: Laura Newton (272)
- Most wickets: Nicole Richards (15)

The 2016 Women's Twenty20 Cup, known for sponsorship reasons as the 2016 NatWest Women's Twenty20 Cup was the 8th cricket Women's Twenty20 Cup tournament. It took place in June and July, with 36 teams taking part: 34 county teams plus Scotland and Wales. Kent Women won the Twenty20 Cup, their third title, and completed the double later in 2016 with their victory in the County Championship.

The tournament ran alongside the 50-over 2016 Women's County Championship, and was followed by the inaugural Twenty20 Women's Cricket Super League, competed for by regional teams.

== Competition format ==
Teams played matches within a series of divisions with the winners of the top division being crowned the Champions. Matches were played using a Twenty20 format.

The championship worked on a points system with positions within the divisions being based on the total points. Points were awarded as follows:

Win: 4 points.
Tie: 1 point.
Loss: 0 points.
Abandoned/Cancelled: 1 point.

== Teams ==
The 2016 Women's Twenty20 Cup was divided into four divisions: Division One and Division Two with eight teams each, Division Three with nine teams and Division Four with 11 teams, divided into three regional groups; teams played between six and eight games, depending on the division.

Division One	Berkshire	Kent	Lancashire	Middlesex	Nottinghamshire	Sussex	Warwickshire	Yorkshire	
Division Two	Durham	Essex	Hampshire	Somerset	Staffordshire	Surrey	Wales	Worcestershire	
Division Three	Cheshire	Cornwall	Derbyshire	Devon	Hertfordshire	Northamptonshire	Oxfordshire	Scotland	Shropshire
Division Four - Group A	Cambridgeshire	Norfolk	Suffolk						
Division Four - Group B	Buckinghamshire	Dorset	Gloucestershire	Wiltshire					
Division Four - Group C	Cumbria	Leicestershire and Rutland	Lincolnshire	Northumberland					

== Division One ==
Team	Pld	W	L	T	A	C	NRR	Ded	Pts
Kent (C)	7	5	2	0	0	0	+0.43	0	20
Warwickshire	7	4	2	0	0	1	+0.44	0	17
Middlesex	7	3	2	0	0	2	+0.29	0	14
Berkshire	7	3	4	0	0	0	−0.06	0	12
Lancashire	7	3	4	0	0	0	−0.64	0	12
Yorkshire	7	2	3	0	0	2	+0.79	0	10
Sussex	7	2	3	0	0	2	−0.07	0	9
Nottinghamshire (R)	7	2	4	0	0	1	−0.81	0	9

Source: ECB Women's Twenty20 Cup

== Division Two ==
Team	Pld	W	L	T	A	C	NRR	Ded	Pts
Somerset (P)	7	5	2	0	0	0	+0.78	0	20
Surrey (P)	7	4	1	0	1	1	+0.71	0	18
Wales	7	4	2	0	0	1	+0.95	0	17
Worcestershire	7	4	3	0	0	0	+0.35	0	16
Essex	7	3	3	0	0	1	+0.55	0	13
Hampshire	7	3	4	0	0	0	−0.33	0	12
Staffordshire	7	2	4	0	0	1	−0.44	0	9
Durham	7	0	6	0	1	0	−2.48	0	1

Source: ECB Women's Twenty20 Cup

== Division Three ==
Team	Pld	W	L	T	A	C	NRR	Ded	Pts
Scotland (P)	8	8	0	0	0	0	+1.79	0	32
Derbyshire (P)	8	7	1	0	0	0	+0.89	0	28
Devon	8	6	2	0	0	0	+1.99	0	24
Northamptonshire	8	4	4	0	0	0	−0.80	0	16
Oxfordshire	8	3	4	0	1	0	–0.14	0	13
Cheshire	8	3	4	0	1	0	−0.35	0	13
Cornwall	8	2	6	0	0	0	−1.24	0	8
Hertfordshire	8	2	6	0	0	0	−1.05	0	8
Shropshire	8	0	8	0	0	0	−1.53	0	0

Source: ECB Women's Twenty20 Cup

== Division Four ==
=== Group A ===
Team	Pld	W	L	T	A	C	NRR	Ded	Pts
Suffolk	6	6	0	0	0	0	+0.88	0	24
Norfolk	6	3	3	0	0	0	+0.90	0	12
Cambridgeshire	6	0	6	0	0	0	−1.77	0	0

Source: ECB Women's Twenty20 Cup

=== Group B ===
Team	Pld	W	L	T	A	C	NRR	Ded	Pts
Gloucestershire	6	4	0	0	0	2	+5.61	0	18
Wiltshire	6	2	2	0	0	2	−0.30	0	10
Buckinghamshire	6	2	2	0	0	2	−1.65	0	10
Dorset	6	0	4	0	0	2	−3.32	0	2

Source: ECB Women's Twenty20 Cup

=== Group C ===
Team	Pld	W	L	T	A	C	NRR	Ded	Pts
Leicestershire and Rutland	6	6	0	0	0	0	+1.82	0	24
Northumberland	6	3	3	0	0	0	+0.35	0	12
Cumbria	6	2	4	0	0	0	−0.36	0	8
Lincolnshire	6	1	5	0	0	0	−1.72	0	4

Source: ECB Women's Twenty20 Cup

== Statistics ==
=== Most runs ===
Player	Team	Matches	Innings	Runs	Average	HS	100s	50s
Laura Newton	Cheshire	8	8	272	38.85	71*	0	3
Thea Brookes	Worcestershire	6	6	270	54.00	79*	0	3
Suzie Bates	Kent	7	7	240	40.00	106*	1	0
Lauren Parfitt	Wales	6	6	215	43.00	74*	0	2
Lauren Hemp	Norfolk	6	6	213	35.50	84	0	2

Source: CricketArchive

=== Most wickets ===
Player	Team	Balls	Wickets	Average	BBI	5w
Nicole Richards	Somerset	150	15	6.53	4/12	0
Kari Carswell	Scotland	126	13	6.46	4/1	0
Suzie Bates	Kent	168	12	10.08	3/11	0
Anje Lague	Hampshire	186	12	10.25	3/9	0
Nicola Hawes	Northumberland	121	11	7.36	3/12	0

Source: CricketArchive
