= 2015 Women's County Championship =

- Administrator(s): England and Wales Cricket Board
- Cricket format: 50 over
- Tournament format(s): League system
- Champions: Yorkshire (6th title)
- Participants: 38
- Most runs: Charlotte Taylor (422)
- Most wickets: Sarah Clarke (23)

The 2015 Women's County One-Day Championship was the 19th cricket Women's County Championship season. It ran from May to September and saw 34 county teams and teams representing Ireland, Scotland, Wales and the Netherlands compete in a series of divisions. Yorkshire Women won the County Championship as winners of the top division, with Kent finishing runners-up. The Championship was Yorkshire's sixth title since the institution of the full County Championship, and their first since 2002.

== Competition format ==
Teams played matches within a series of divisions with the winners of the top division being crowned County Champions. Matches were played using a one day format with 50 overs per side.

The championship worked on a points system, the winner being the team with most average points of completed games in the first division. The points are awarded as follows:

Win: 10 points + bonus points.
Tie: 5 points + bonus points.
Loss: Bonus points.
Abandoned or cancelled: Match not counted to average.

Bonus points are awarded for various batting and bowling milestones. The bonus points for each match are retained if the match is completed.

- Batting

1.50 runs per over (RPO) or more: 1 point
2 RPO or more: 2 points
3 RPO or more: 3 points
4 RPO or more: 4 points

- Bowling

3-4 wickets taken: 1 point
5-6 wickets taken: 2 points
7-8 wickets taken: 3 points
9-10 wickets taken: 4 points

== Teams ==
The 2015 Championship was divided into four divisions: Divisions One to Three with nine teams apiece and Division Four with eleven teams across two groups.

Teams in each group played each other once.

| Division One | Berkshire | Kent | Lancashire | Middlesex | Nottinghamshire | Surrey | Sussex | Warwickshire | Yorkshire |
| Division Two | Devon | Durham | Essex | Ireland | Scotland | Somerset | Staffordshire | Wales | Worcestershire |
| Division Three | Cheshire | Derbyshire | Hampshire | Hertfordshire | Leicestershire and Rutland | Netherlands | Northamptonshire | Oxfordshire | Suffolk |
| Division Four North & East | Cambridgeshire and Huntingdonshire | Cumbria | Lincolnshire | Norfolk | Northumberland | | | | |
| Division Four South & West | Buckinghamshire | Cornwall | Dorset | Gloucestershire | Shropshire | Wiltshire | | | |

== Division One ==
| Team | Pld | W | L | T | A | Bat | Bowl | Ded | Pts | Avg. |
|---|---|---|---|---|---|---|---|---|---|---|
| Yorkshire (C) | 8 | 6 | 1 | 0 | 1 | 25 | 22 | 0 | 107 | 15.29 |
| Kent | 8 | 5 | 1 | 1 | 1 | 24 | 26 | 0 | 105 | 15.00 |
| Sussex | 8 | 4 | 2 | 1 | 1 | 25 | 24 | 0 | 94 | 13.43 |
| Berkshire | 8 | 4 | 2 | 0 | 2 | 21 | 19 | 0 | 80 | 13.33 |
| Middlesex | 8 | 3 | 4 | 0 | 1 | 22 | 22 | 0 | 74 | 10.57 |
| Surrey | 8 | 3 | 5 | 0 | 0 | 25 | 28 | 0 | 83 | 10.38 |
| Warwickshire | 8 | 3 | 4 | 0 | 1 | 19 | 22 | 0 | 71 | 10.14 |
| Nottinghamshire (R) | 8 | 3 | 4 | 0 | 1 | 16 | 22 | 0 | 68 | 9.71 |
| Lancashire (R) | 8 | 0 | 8 | 0 | 0 | 17 | 6 | 0 | 23 | 2.88 |

Source: ECB Women's County Championship

== Division Two ==
| Team | Pld | W | L | T | A | Bat | Bowl | Ded | Pts | Avg. |
|---|---|---|---|---|---|---|---|---|---|---|
| Somerset (P) | 8 | 6 | 0 | 0 | 2 | 21 | 24 | 0 | 105 | 17.50 |
| Staffordshire (P) | 8 | 5 | 1 | 0 | 2 | 22 | 21 | 0 | 93 | 15.50 |
| Worcestershire | 8 | 4 | 3 | 0 | 1 | 24 | 21 | 0 | 85 | 12.14 |
| Ireland | 8 | 3 | 3 | 0 | 2 | 13 | 21 | 0 | 64 | 10.67 |
| Essex | 8 | 3 | 4 | 0 | 1 | 15 | 24 | 0 | 69 | 9.86 |
| Wales | 8 | 2 | 4 | 0 | 2 | 19 | 18 | 0 | 57 | 9.50 |
| Devon | 8 | 3 | 5 | 0 | 0 | 24 | 21 | 0 | 75 | 9.38 |
| Durham (R) | 8 | 3 | 5 | 0 | 0 | 16 | 22 | 0 | 68 | 8.50 |
| Scotland (R) | 8 | 1 | 5 | 0 | 2 | 13 | 20 | 0 | 43 | 7.17 |

Source: ECB Women's County Championship

== Division Three ==
| Team | Pld | W | L | T | A | Bat | Bowl | Ded | Pts | Avg. |
|---|---|---|---|---|---|---|---|---|---|---|
| Hampshire (P) | 8 | 6 | 1 | 0 | 1 | 23 | 26 | 0 | 109 | 15.57 |
| Leicestershire and Rutland (P) | 8 | 5 | 3 | 0 | 0 | 26 | 25 | 0 | 101 | 12.63 |
| Derbyshire | 8 | 4 | 3 | 0 | 1 | 21 | 20 | 0 | 81 | 11.57 |
| Oxfordshire | 8 | 3 | 2 | 1 | 2 | 16 | 18 | 0 | 69 | 11.50 |
| Cheshire | 8 | 3 | 3 | 0 | 2 | 17 | 18 | 0 | 65 | 10.83 |
| Netherlands | 8 | 3 | 3 | 0 | 2 | 18 | 17 | 0 | 65 | 10.83 |
| Northamptonshire | 8 | 3 | 4 | 0 | 1 | 10 | 17 | 0 | 57 | 8.14 |
| Hertfordshire (R) | 8 | 2 | 4 | 0 | 2 | 15 | 9 | 0 | 44 | 7.33 |
| Suffolk (R) | 8 | 0 | 6 | 1 | 1 | 16 | 17 | 0 | 38 | 5.43 |

Source: ECB Women's County Championship

== Division Four ==
=== North & East ===
| Team | Pld | W | L | T | A | Bat | Bowl | Ded | Pts | Avg. |
|---|---|---|---|---|---|---|---|---|---|---|
| Norfolk (P) | 4 | 4 | 0 | 0 | 0 | 12 | 16 | 0 | 68 | 17.00 |
| Cumbria | 4 | 3 | 1 | 0 | 0 | 10 | 15 | 0 | 55 | 13.75 |
| Cambridgeshire and Huntingdonshire | 4 | 1 | 3 | 0 | 0 | 8 | 14 | 0 | 32 | 8.00 |
| Northumberland | 4 | 1 | 3 | 0 | 0 | 7 | 14 | 0 | 31 | 7.75 |
| Lincolnshire | 4 | 1 | 3 | 0 | 0 | 7 | 12 | 0 | 29 | 7.25 |

Source: ECB Women's County Championship

=== South & West ===
| Team | Pld | W | L | T | A | Bat | Bowl | Ded | Pts | Avg. |
|---|---|---|---|---|---|---|---|---|---|---|
| Gloucestershire (P) | 5 | 4 | 0 | 0 | 1 | 16 | 15 | 0 | 71 | 17.75 |
| Shropshire | 5 | 3 | 1 | 0 | 1 | 13 | 15 | 0 | 58 | 14.50 |
| Cornwall | 5 | 2 | 1 | 0 | 2 | 8 | 10 | 0 | 38 | 12.67 |
| Wiltshire | 5 | 1 | 2 | 0 | 2 | 7 | 5 | 0 | 22 | 7.33 |
| Dorset | 5 | 1 | 3 | 0 | 1 | 4 | 14 | 0 | 28 | 7.00 |
| Buckinghamshire | 5 | 0 | 4 | 0 | 1 | 5 | 13 | 0 | 18 | 4.00 |

Source: ECB Women's County Championship

== Statistics ==
=== Most runs ===
| Player | Team | Matches | Innings | Runs | Average | HS | 100s | 50s |
|---|---|---|---|---|---|---|---|---|
| Charlotte Taylor | Hampshire | 7 | 7 | 422 | 70.33 | 115* | 1 | 1 |
| Evelyn Jones | Staffordshire | 5 | 5 | 331 | 82.75 | 115* | 2 | 1 |
| Miranda Veringmeier | Netherlands | 6 | 5 | 326 | 65.20 | 127 | 1 | 2 |
| Sophie Luff | Somerset | 5 | 5 | 323 | 107.66 | 138* | 2 | 1 |
| Charlotte Horton | Derbyshire | 7 | 7 | 306 | 51.00 | 100 | 1 | 2 |

Source: CricketArchive

=== Most wickets ===
| Player | Team | Balls | Wickets | Average | BBI | 5w |
|---|---|---|---|---|---|---|
| Sarah Clarke | Surrey | 448 | 23 | 10.21 | 4/11 | 0 |
| Katie Levick | Yorkshire | 377 | 20 | 9.65 | 6/25 | 2 |
| Holly Colvin | Sussex | 396 | 18 | 10.00 | 5/33 | 1 |
| Hannah Jeffrey | Essex | 414 | 16 | 9.62 | 5/19 | 1 |
| Sarah Sundaram | Derbyshire | 348 | 15 | 11.00 | 4/20 | 0 |

Source: CricketArchive
