= Jodie Dibble =

English cricketer (born 1994)

Jodie Cook
Personal information
- Full name: Jodie Marie Cook
- Born: 17 September 1994 (age 32); Exeter, Devon, England
- Batting: Right-handed
- Bowling: Slow left-arm orthodox
- Role: All-rounder
- Relatives: Adam Dibble (brother)

International information
- National side: England (2014)
- Only T20I (cap 38): 24 March 2014 v West Indies

Domestic team information
- Years: Team
- 2008–2016: Devon
- 2011: → Berkshire (on loan)
- 2016–2017: Western Storm
- 2017–2021: Nottinghamshire
- 2021–2025: Lincolnshire

Career statistics
| Competition | T20I | LA | T20 |
|---|---|---|---|
| Matches | 1 | 70 | 80 |
| Runs scored | 0 | 1,039 | 1,044 |
| Batting average | 0.00 | 17.91 | 22.69 |
| 100s/50s | 0/0 | 1/4 | 1/6 |
| Top score | 0 | 118 | 104* |
| Balls bowled | 12 | 2,529 | 1,211 |
| Wickets | 0 | 70 | 52 |
| Bowling average | – | 20.38 | 20.40 |
| 5 wickets in innings | – | 0 | 0 |
| 10 wickets in match | – | 0 | 0 |
| Best bowling | – | 4/11 | 4/1 |
| Catches/stumpings | 0/– | 31/– | 20/– |
- Source: CricketArchive, 5 October 2025

Jodie Marie Cook (née Dibble; born 17 September 1994) is a former English cricketer who played as a slow left-arm orthodox bowler and right-handed batter. She appeared in one Twenty20 International for England, against West Indies on 24 March 2014. She has played domestic cricket for Devon, Berkshire, Nottinghamshire and Western Storm.

== Early and personal life ==
Cook was born Jodie Marie Dibble on 17 September 1994 in Exeter, Devon. She married in 2018 and changed her surname to Cook.

== Domestic career ==
Cook made her county debut for Devon in 2008, making three appearances in the County Championship as the team secured promotion to Division Three. Cook subsequently became a regular for Devon and in her second season took the remarkable bowling figures of 4 wickets for 1 run in a T20 match against Scotland. She helped Devon secure a further County Championship promotion to Division Two in 2011. Cook made her county high score of 118 in a County Championship match against Wales on 24 May 2015. Less than a month later she made a T20 century against Buckinghamshire.

Cook played one match for Berkshire in the 2011 Women's County Championship, scoring 14 runs before the second innings was washed out.

Cook played for Emeralds in the now-defunct Super Fours competition in 2012.

Cook played for Western Storm in the 2016 and 2017 seasons of the Women's Cricket Super League, helping them to the title in the latter. She appeared 12 times for Western Storm, taking 4 wickets at an average of 57.75 and an economy rate of 7.00.

In 2017, Cook left Devon to join Nottinghamshire, allowing her to play in Division One of the County Championship. In her first season at the club she helped them to promotion to Division One of the Twenty20 Cup.

== International career ==
Cook received England recognition when she was picked in the England Academy squad to tour India in 2011. She was later picked for England Academy tours of South Africa in 2012 and Sri Lanka in both 2013 and 2014.

In February 2014, Cook was called up to the senior England squad for the 2014 World Twenty20 in Bangladesh. She played in England's opening match against West Indies, bowling two overs for 21 runs without taking any wickets and being dismissed for a golden duck with the bat. She did not play in any other matches in the tournament as England finished as runners-up. Following the tournament, Cook underwent shoulder surgery, her third operation in as many years.

In March 2015, Cook was selected for an England Academy series against Australia A in Dubai. She also played in three England Academy matches at home to Australia in July and August 2015, however, she has not featured in any England squads since.
