= Chiara Green =

English cricketer

Personal information
- Full name: Chiara Marisa Green
- Born: 18 October 1993 (age 33); Brighton, East Sussex, England
- Batting: Right-handed
- Bowling: Right-arm off break
- Role: Bowler

Domestic team information
- Years: Team
- 2010–present: Sussex
- 2021: Southern Vipers

Career statistics
Competition	WLA	WT20
Matches	38	57
Runs scored	235	142
Batting average	13.05	9.46
100s/50s	0/0	0/0
Top score	33	20*
Balls bowled	1,345	1,098
Wickets	31	56
Bowling average	25.19	15.50
5 wickets in innings	0	0
10 wickets in match	0	0
Best bowling	3/13	3/6
Catches/stumpings	6/–	3/–
- Source: CricketArchive, 23 October 2023

Chiara Marisa Green (born 18 October 1993) is an English cricketer who currently plays for Sussex. She plays as a right-arm off break bowler. She has previously played for Southern Vipers.

== Early life ==
Green was born on 18 October 1993 in Brighton, East Sussex.

== Domestic career ==
Green made her county debut in 2010, for Sussex against Nottinghamshire, taking 2/18 from 8 overs. The following season, 2011, Green took 5 wickets at an average of 8.20 in the Twenty20 Cup, and took 2 wickets in the same competition the following season as Sussex won the competition. Green's strength continued to be T20 bowling over the following seasons, for example taking 7 wickets at an average of 13.74 in 2014, and helping her side to another Twenty20 Cup title in 2015.

Green had a strong season in 2018, taking 6 wickets at an average of 13.16 in the County Championship and 12 wickets, the most for her side, at an average of 7.83 in the Twenty20 Cup. In 2019, she took her T20 best bowling figures of 3/6 in a match against Warwickshire.

In August 2021, Green was added to the Southern Vipers squad, and made her debut for the side in a Charlotte Edwards Cup match against South East Stars, taking 1/25 from 3 overs. In 2022, she played eight matches for Sussex in the Women's Twenty20 Cup, taking four wickets. She was Sussex's leading wicket-taker in the 2023 Women's Twenty20 Cup, with 9 wickets at an average of 8.66.
