= 2010 Women's Twenty20 Cup =

- Administrator(s): England and Wales Cricket Board
- Cricket format: Twenty20
- Tournament format(s): League system
- Champions: Berkshire (1st title)
- Participants: 33
- Most runs: Charlotte Edwards (229)
- Most wickets: Isa Guha (11)

The 2010 Women's Twenty20 Cup was the 2nd cricket Women's Twenty20 Cup tournament. It took place in August and September, with 33 teams taking part: 32 county teams and Wales. Berkshire Women won the Twenty20 Cup, beating Kent Women in the final, achieving their first T20 title. The tournament ran alongside the 50-over 2010 Women's County Championship.

== Competition format ==
Teams played matches within a series of regionalised divisions, with the winners of the top divisions progressing to semi-finals and a final. Matches were played using a Twenty20 format.

The divisions worked on a points system with positions within the divisions being based on the total points. Points were awarded as follows:

Win: 2 points.
Tie: 1 points.
Loss: 0 points.
Abandoned/Cancelled: 1 point.

== Teams ==
The 2010 Women's Twenty20 Cup was divided into three regions: Midlands & North, South and South & West. Each region was further divided into divisions: Midlands & North with four, South with three and South & West with two. Teams in each division played each other once, and then the top two played in a Division Final and bottom two in a 3rd-place play-off. Promotion and relegation places were determined by the Division Finals and 3rd-place play-offs. The winners of each Division 1, and the best-performing second-place team, progressed to the semi-finals.

=== Midlands & North ===
| Division One | Cheshire | Nottinghamshire | Warwickshire | Yorkshire |
| Division Two | Durham | Lancashire | Staffordshire | Worcestershire |
| Division Three | Cumbria | Northamptonshire | Northumberland | |
| Division Four | Gloucestershire | Leicestershire and Rutland | Oxfordshire | |

=== South ===
| Division One | Kent | Middlesex | Surrey | Sussex |
| Division Two | Hampshire | Hertfordshire | Shropshire | Wales |
| Division Three | Cambridgeshire and Huntingdonshire | Norfolk | Suffolk | |

=== South & West ===
| Division One | Berkshire | Devon | Essex | Somerset |
| Division Two | Buckinghamshire | Cornwall | Dorset | Wiltshire |

== Midlands & North ==
=== Division 1 ===
==== Group stage ====
| Team | Pld | W | L | T | A | C | NRR | Ded | Pts |
|---|---|---|---|---|---|---|---|---|---|
| Yorkshire (Q) | 3 | 3 | 0 | 0 | 0 | 0 | +1.64 | 0 | 6 |
| Nottinghamshire | 3 | 2 | 1 | 0 | 0 | 0 | +0.69 | 0 | 4 |
| Cheshire (R) | 3 | 1 | 2 | 0 | 0 | 0 | −1.76 | 0 | 2 |
| Warwickshire | 3 | 0 | 3 | 0 | 0 | 0 | −0.58 | 0 | 0 |

Source: ECB Women's Twenty20 Cup

==== Final ====
4 August 2010
Scorecard

| Nottinghamshire; 125/4 (20 overs) | v | Yorkshire; 129/3 (17 overs) |
| Lucy Doolan 56 (51); Phoebe Graham 2/24 (4 overs) | | Katherine Brunt 62* (45); Rebecca Widdowson 1/18 (2 overs) |

Yorkshire won by 7 wickets
Arlington Avenue, Leamington Spa
Umpires: Andy Howes and Ken Morgan

- Nottinghamshire won the toss and elected to bat.
- Yorkshire progress to the semi-finals.

==== Third-place play-off ====
4 August 2010
Scorecard

| Cheshire; 87 (17 overs) | v | Warwickshire; 90/7 (19 overs) |
| Hannah Gradwell 21 (15); Isobelle Watson 2/11 (3 overs) | | Kayleigh Alsop 30* (–); Kate Coppack 3/21 (3 overs) |

Warwickshire won by 3 wickets
Arlington Avenue, Leamington Spa

- Warwickshire won the toss and elected to field.
- Cheshire relegated to Midlands & North Division 2.

=== Division 2 ===
| Team | Pld | W | L | T | A | C | NRR | Ded | Pts |
|---|---|---|---|---|---|---|---|---|---|
| Staffordshire (P) | 3 | 2 | 0 | 0 | 0 | 1 | +1.96 | 0 | 5 |
| Worcestershire | 3 | 2 | 0 | 0 | 0 | 1 | +0.53 | 0 | 5 |
| Lancashire | 3 | 0 | 2 | 0 | 0 | 1 | −0.69 | 0 | 1 |
| Durham (R) | 3 | 0 | 2 | 0 | 0 | 1 | −1.73 | 0 | 1 |

Source: ECB Women's Twenty20 Cup

==== Final ====
4 August 2010
Scorecard

| Staffordshire | v | Worcestershire |

Match Abandoned
The Copper Yard, Denby

- No toss.
- No play possible due to rain.
- Staffordshire promoted to Midlands & North Division 1.

==== Third-place play-off ====
4 August 2010
Scorecard

| Durham | v | Lancashire |

Match Abandoned
The Copper Yard, Denby

- No toss.
- No play possible due to rain.
- Durham relegated to Midlands & North Division 3.

=== Division 3 ===
| Team | Pld | W | L | T | A | C | NRR | Ded | Pts |
|---|---|---|---|---|---|---|---|---|---|
| Northamptonshire (P) | 2 | 2 | 0 | 0 | 0 | 0 | +2.75 | 0 | 4 |
| Northumberland | 2 | 1 | 1 | 0 | 0 | 0 | −1.26 | 0 | 2 |
| Cumbria | 2 | 0 | 2 | 0 | 0 | 0 | −1.36 | 0 | 0 |

Source: ECB Women's Twenty20 Cup

==== Final ====
4 August 2010
Scorecard

| Northamptonshire; 133/5 (20 overs) | v | Northumberland; 99/9 (20 overs) |
| Farida Bibi 34* (37); Holly Allen 2/21 (4 overs) | | Rachel Cowans 31 (–); Zehmarad Afzal 4/13 (3 overs) |

Northamptonshire won by 34 runs
Scorers, Shirley
Umpires: Mark Gumbley and David Ludlow

- Northumberland won the toss and elected to field.
- Northamptonshire promoted to Midlands & North Division 2.

=== Division 4 ===
| Team | Pld | W | L | T | A | C | NRR | Ded | Pts |
|---|---|---|---|---|---|---|---|---|---|
| Gloucestershire (P) | 2 | 1 | 0 | 1 | 0 | 0 | +0.69 | 0 | 3 |
| Leicestershire | 2 | 1 | 1 | 0 | 0 | 0 | +1.32 | 0 | 2 |
| Oxfordshire | 2 | 0 | 1 | 1 | 0 | 0 | −2.47 | 0 | 1 |

Source: ECB Women's Twenty20 Cup

==== Final ====
4 August 2010
Scorecard

| Gloucestershire; 123/5 (20 overs) | v | Leicestershire; 67 (14.5 overs) |
| Charlotte Walker 27 (–); Alice Quemby 1/12 (3 overs) | | Harriet Leach 20 (–); Chloe Davis 4/16 (4 overs) |

Gloucestershire won by 56 runs
The Wardens, Solihull

- Leicestershire won the toss and elected to field.
- Gloucestershire promoted to Midlands & North Division 3.

== South ==
=== Division 1 ===
==== Group stage ====
| Team | Pld | W | L | T | A | C | NRR | Ded | Pts |
|---|---|---|---|---|---|---|---|---|---|
| Kent (Q) | 3 | 3 | 0 | 0 | 0 | 0 | +2.87 | 0 | 6 |
| Sussex (Q) | 3 | 2 | 1 | 0 | 0 | 0 | +2.30 | 0 | 4 |
| Middlesex | 3 | 1 | 2 | 0 | 0 | 0 | −1.84 | 0 | 2 |
| Surrey (R) | 3 | 0 | 3 | 0 | 0 | 0 | −2.62 | 0 | 0 |

Source: ECB Women's Twenty20 Cup

==== Final ====
4 August 2010
Scorecard

| Kent; 137/3 (15 overs) | v | Sussex; 77 (14.3 overs) |
| Lydia Greenway 56* (38); Alexia Walker 2/21 (3 overs) | | Lucy Uncles 25 (22); Jess Denniff 3/4 (1.3 overs) |

Kent won by 60 runs
Hunts Hill Road, Normandy
Umpires: Graham Bullock and Clive Peacock

- Sussex won the toss and elected to field.
- Match reduced to 15 overs per side due to rain.
- Kent and Sussex progress to the semi-finals.

==== Third-place play-off ====
4 August 2010
Scorecard

| Surrey; 84/9 (19 overs) | v | Middlesex; 85/1 (18.1 overs) |
| Olivia Thorogood 14 (19); Danni Warren 3/20 (4 overs) | | Helena Stolle 36* (47); Katherine Robson 1/18 (4 overs) |

Middlesex won by 9 wickets
Hunts Hill Road, Normandy
Umpires: Bill Normington and Pierre Tartari

- Surrey won the toss and elected to bat.
- Match reduced to 19 overs per side due to rain.
- Surrey relegated to South Division 2.

=== Division 2 ===
| Team | Pld | W | L | T | A | C | NRR | Ded | Pts |
|---|---|---|---|---|---|---|---|---|---|
| Wales (P) | 3 | 3 | 0 | 0 | 0 | 0 | +1.22 | 0 | 6 |
| Hampshire | 3 | 2 | 1 | 0 | 0 | 0 | +1.48 | 0 | 4 |
| Hertfordshire | 3 | 1 | 2 | 0 | 0 | 0 | −0.24 | 0 | 2 |
| Shropshire (R) | 3 | 0 | 3 | 0 | 0 | 0 | −2.26 | 0 | 0 |

Source: ECB Women's Twenty20 Cup

==== Final ====
4 August 2010
Scorecard

| Hampshire; 128/7 (20 overs) | v | Wales; 129/4 (19.3 overs) |
| Aylish Cranstone 37 (37); Rebecca Struthers 3/18 (4 overs) | | Bethan Moorcraft 41 (45); Amy Mistry 1/16 (3 overs) |

Wales won by 6 wickets
Spytty Park, Newport
Umpires: Nigel Emery and Bob Szpadt

- Wales won the toss and elected to field.
- Wales promoted to South Division 1 (although they competed in South & West Division 1 in 2011).

==== Third-place play-off ====
4 August 2010
Scorecard

| Shropshire; 91/4 (20 overs) | v | Hertfordshire; 92/2 (17 overs) |
| Charlotte Walsh 26* (23); Alice Lawman 1/12 (4 overs) | | Hannah Smith 53* (59); Megan Jones 1/12 (3 overs) |

Hertfordshire won by 8 wickets
Spytty Park, Newport
Umpires: Eric Attwood and David Stevens

- Hertfordshire won the toss and elected to field.
- Shropshire relegated to South Division 3.

=== Division 3 ===
| Team | Pld | W | L | T | A | C | NRR | Ded | Pts |
|---|---|---|---|---|---|---|---|---|---|
| Cambridgeshire and Huntingdonshire (P) | 2 | 2 | 0 | 0 | 0 | 0 | +2.38 | 0 | 4 |
| Norfolk | 2 | 1 | 1 | 0 | 0 | 0 | −0.09 | 0 | 2 |
| Suffolk | 2 | 0 | 2 | 0 | 0 | 0 | −2.29 | 0 | 0 |

Source: ECB Women's Twenty20 Cup

Note: Division final between Cambridgeshire and Huntingdonshire and Norfolk not competed.

== South & West ==
=== Division 1 ===
==== Group stage ====
| Team | Pld | W | L | T | A | C | NRR | Ded | Pts |
|---|---|---|---|---|---|---|---|---|---|
| Berkshire (Q) | 3 | 3 | 0 | 0 | 0 | 0 | +2.30 | 0 | 6 |
| Essex | 3 | 2 | 1 | 0 | 0 | 0 | −0.75 | 0 | 4 |
| Somerset | 3 | 1 | 2 | 0 | 0 | 0 | −0.39 | 0 | 2 |
| Devon | 3 | 0 | 3 | 0 | 0 | 0 | −1.80 | 0 | 0 |

Source: ECB Women's Twenty20 Cup

==== Final ====
4 August 2010
Scorecard

| Berkshire | v | Essex |

Match Abandoned
Wellington College, Crowthorne

- No toss.
- No play possible due to rain.
- Berkshire progress to the semi-finals.

==== Third-place play-off ====
4 August 2010
Scorecard

| Devon | v | Somerset |

Match Abandoned
Wellington College, Crowthorne

- No toss.
- No play possible due to rain.

=== Division 2 ===
| Team | Pld | W | L | T | A | C | NRR | Ded | Pts |
|---|---|---|---|---|---|---|---|---|---|
| Wiltshire | 3 | 3 | 0 | 0 | 0 | 0 | +2.29 | 0 | 6 |
| Buckinghamshire | 3 | 2 | 1 | 0 | 0 | 0 | −0.51 | 0 | 4 |
| Dorset | 3 | 1 | 2 | 0 | 0 | 0 | +0.03 | 0 | 2 |
| Cornwall | 3 | 0 | 3 | 0 | 0 | 0 | –1.57 | 0 | 0 |

Source: ECB Women's Twenty20 Cup

==== Final ====
4 August 2010
Scorecard

| Buckinghamshire; 68 (16.5 overs) | v | Wiltshire; 69/8 (17.2 overs) |
| Lorna Browne 12 (15); Emilie Sauven 3/16 (2.5 overs) | | Lisa Keightley 21 (24); Louise Verroken-Jones 4/8 (4 overs) |

Wiltshire won by 2 wickets
Sherborne School, Sherborne
Umpires: Ron Hansford and Bill Haskell

- Wiltshire won the toss and elected to field.

==== Third-place play-off ====
4 August 2010
Scorecard

| Dorset; 105/3 (20 overs) | v | Cornwall; 85/7 (20 overs) |
| Laura Thomas 30* (–); Lisa Reeks 1/13 (3 overs) | | Lorraine Fletcher 16* (–); Lauren Willows 2/6 (2 overs) |

Dorset won by 20 runs
Sherborne School, Sherborne
Umpires: Brian Medler and Nick Whitehouse

- Cornwall won the toss and elected to field.

== Knock-Out Stage ==
=== Semi-finals ===
18 September 2010
Scorecard

| Berkshire; 135/4 (20 overs) | v | Kent; 106 (19.1 overs) |
| Claire Taylor 65* (43); Alice Davidson-Richards 3/11 (3 overs) | | Lydia Greenway 28 (36); Judith Turner 3/12 (3.1 overs) |

Berkshire won by 29 runs
Cricket Field Lane, Bishop's Stortford
Umpires: Murray Carlson and John Sweedy

- Kent won the toss and elected to field.
- Berkshire progress to the final.

18 September 2010
Scorecard

| Sussex; 78/5 (20 overs) | v | Yorkshire; 81/0 (15.3 overs) |
| Alexia Walker 36 (42); Katherine Brunt 2/15 (4 overs) | | Katherine Brunt 45* (44) |

Yorkshire won by 10 wickets
Cricket Field Lane, Bishop's Stortford
Umpires: Roger Abraham and Allen Wells

- Yorkshire won the toss and elected to field.
- Yorkshire progress to the final.

=== Third-place play-off ===
18 September 2010
Scorecard

| Kent; 90 (17.5 overs) | v | Sussex; 93/6 (19 overs) |
| Charlotte Edwards 28 (18); Jade Elphick 4/13 (3.5 overs) | | Rosalie Birch 23 (32); Alice Davidson-Richards 2/9 (4 overs) |

Sussex won by 4 wickets
Cricket Field Lane, Bishop's Stortford
Umpires: Murray Carlson and John Sweedy

- Kent won the toss and elected to bat.

=== Final ===
18 September 2010
Scorecard

| Berkshire; 173/7 (20 overs) | v | Yorkshire; 127/5 (20 overs) |
| Alice Macleod 61 (46); Hannah Buck 3/38 (4 overs) | | Danielle Hazell 45* (39); Daisy Gardner 2/22 (4 overs) |

Berkshire won by 46 runs
Cricket Field Lane, Bishop's Stortford
Umpires: Roger Abraham and Allen Wells

- Berkshire won the toss and elected to bat.
- Berkshire won the 2010 Women's Twenty20 Cup.

== Statistics ==
=== Most runs ===
| Player | Team | Matches | Innings | Runs | Average | HS | 100s | 50s |
|---|---|---|---|---|---|---|---|---|
| Charlotte Edwards | Kent | 6 | 6 | 229 | 38.16 | 68 | 0 | 2 |
| Lisa Keightley | Wiltshire | 4 | 4 | 196 | 98.00 | 101* | 1 | 1 |
| Lucy Doolan | Nottinghamshire | 3 | 3 | 168 | 84.00 | 58 | 0 | 3 |
| Alice Macleod | Berkshire | 5 | 5 | 164 | 41.00 | 64* | 0 | 2 |
| Sarah Taylor | Sussex | 4 | 4 | 164 | 54.66 | 73 | 0 | 2 |

Source: CricketArchive

=== Most wickets ===
| Player | Team | Balls | Wickets | Average | BBI | 5w |
|---|---|---|---|---|---|---|
| Isa Guha | Berkshire | 108 | 11 | 9.00 | 4/12 | 0 |
| Alice Davidson-Richards | Kent | 90 | 10 | 4.60 | 4/17 | 0 |
| Rebecca Struthers | Wales | 96 | 8 | 9.12 | 3/12 | 0 |
| Hannah Jeffery | Essex | 66 | 7 | 7.57 | 3/15 | 0 |
| Charlotte Edwards | Kent | 108 | 7 | 16.00 | 2/8 | 0 |

Source: CricketArchive
