= 2013 Women's County Championship =

- Administrator(s): England and Wales Cricket Board
- Cricket format: 50 over
- Tournament format(s): League system
- Champions: Sussex (6th title)
- Participants: 37
- Most runs: Heather Knight (604)
- Most wickets: Jenny Withers (20)

The 2013 Women's County One-Day Championship was the 17th cricket Women's County Championship season. It ran from April to September and saw 33 county teams and teams representing Ireland, Scotland, Wales and the Netherlands compete in a series of divisions. Sussex Women won the County Championship as winners of the top division, beating Yorkshire in the division final. The Championship was Sussex's sixth title.

== Competition format ==
Teams played matches within a series of divisions with the winners of the top division being crowned County Champions. Matches were played using a one day format with 50 overs per side.

The championship worked on a points system, with placings decided by average points of completed games. The top two in each division played in a final to determine the winner, subsequently followed by promotion play-offs. The points are awarded as follows:

Win: 10 points + bonus points.
Tie: 5 points + bonus points.
Loss: Bonus points.
Abandoned or cancelled: Match not counted to average.

Bonus points are awarded for various batting and bowling milestones. The bonus points for each match are retained if the match is completed.

- Batting

1.50 runs per over (RPO) or more: 1 point
2 RPO or more: 2 points
3 RPO or more: 3 points
4 RPO or more: 4 points

- Bowling

3-4 wickets taken: 1 point
5-6 wickets taken: 2 points
7-8 wickets taken: 3 points
9-10 wickets taken: 4 points

== Teams ==
The 2013 Championship was divided into four divisions: Divisions One to Three with nine teams apiece and Division Four with two groups of five.

Teams in each group played each other once.

Division One	Berkshire	Essex	Kent	Middlesex	Nottinghamshire	Surrey	Sussex	Warwickshire	Yorkshire
Division Two	Cheshire	Devon	Durham	Ireland	Lancashire	Somerset	Staffordshire	Wales	Worcestershire
Division Three	Derbyshire	Gloucestershire	Hampshire	Hertfordshire	Leicestershire and Rutland	Netherlands	Northamptonshire	Oxfordshire	Scotland
Division Four North & East	Cambridgeshire and Huntingdonshire	Cumbria	Norfolk	Northumberland	Suffolk				
Division Four South & West	Buckinghamshire	Cornwall	Dorset	Shropshire	Wiltshire				

== Division One ==
=== Table ===
Team	Pld	W	L	T	A	Bat	Bowl	Ded	Pts	Avg.
Sussex (Q)	8	6	2	0	0	28	28	0	116	14.50
Yorkshire (Q)	8	6	2	0	0	24	27	0	111	13.88
Kent	8	6	2	0	0	27	20	0	107	13.38
Nottinghamshire	8	4	4	0	0	27	21	0	88	11.00
Berkshire	8	4	4	0	0	24	20	0	84	10.50
Warwickshire	8	4	4	0	0	20	22	0	82	10.25
Middlesex	8	2	6	0	0	28	17	0	65	8.13
Essex (PO)	8	2	5	0	1	17	15	0	52	7.43
Surrey (PO)	8	1	6	0	1	19	18	0	47	6.71

Source: ECB Women's County Championship

=== Play-offs ===
1 September 2013	Essex; 193 (48.3 overs)	v	Surrey; 194/5 (42.4 overs)	Surrey won by 5 wickets
Scorecard	Essex; 193 (48.3 overs)	v	Surrey; 194/5 (42.4 overs)	Toby Howe Cricket Ground, Billericay; Umpires: Jon Glynn and David Griffiths
Scorecard	Beth MacGregor 72 (80); Katherine Robson 3/33 (10 overs)		Susie Rowe 92 (86); Cordelia Griffith 1/27 (5 overs)	Toby Howe Cricket Ground, Billericay; Umpires: Jon Glynn and David Griffiths
Essex won the toss and elected to bat.; Surrey remain in Division One.				Toby Howe Cricket Ground, Billericay; Umpires: Jon Glynn and David Griffiths

15 September 2013	Sussex; 242/4 (50 overs)	v	Yorkshire; 147 (38.5 overs)	Sussex won by 95 runs
Scorecard	Sussex; 242/4 (50 overs)	v	Yorkshire; 147 (38.5 overs)	Campbell Park, Milton Keynes; Umpires: Mark Ennis and Alison Smith
Scorecard	Sarah Taylor 128* (127); Beatrice Firth 2/36 (10 overs)		Katherine Brunt 46* (56); Holly Colvin 3/23 (8 overs)	Campbell Park, Milton Keynes; Umpires: Mark Ennis and Alison Smith
Yorkshire won the toss and elected to field.; Sussex won the 2013 Women's County Championship.				Campbell Park, Milton Keynes; Umpires: Mark Ennis and Alison Smith

== Division Two ==
=== Table ===
Team	Pld	W	L	T	A	Bat	Bowl	Ded	Pts	Avg.
Lancashire (PO)	8	8	0	0	0	27	31	0	138	17.25
Somerset (PO)	8	7	1	0	0	25	23	0	118	14.75
Worcestershire	8	4	3	0	1	18	22	0	80	11.43
Ireland	8	4	4	0	0	24	26	0	90	11.25
Staffordshire	8	4	4	0	0	21	17	0	78	9.75
Cheshire	8	3	4	0	1	17	21	0	68	9.71
Wales	8	1	6	0	1	20	15	0	45	6.43
Devon (PO)	8	1	6	0	1	17	15	0	42	6.00
Durham (PO)	8	1	5	0	2	10	16	0	36	6.00

Source: ECB Women's County Championship

=== Play-offs ===
1 September 2013	Lancashire; 181 (48 overs)	v	Somerset; 194/9 (50 overs)	Somerset won by 13 runs
Scorecard	Lancashire; 181 (48 overs)	v	Somerset; 194/9 (50 overs)	Beech Walk, Leigh; Umpires: Pete Brown and Stephen Taylor
Scorecard	Natalie Brown 70 (79); Jackie Hawker 2/23 (6 overs)		Elwyn Campbell 79 (110); Jasmine Titmuss 3/31 (10 overs)	Beech Walk, Leigh; Umpires: Pete Brown and Stephen Taylor
Lancashire won the toss and elected to field.; Somerset proceed to Division One/Two play-off.				Beech Walk, Leigh; Umpires: Pete Brown and Stephen Taylor

1 September 2013	Devon; 264/9 (50 overs)	v	Durham; 156/9 (50 overs)	Devon won by 108 runs
Scorecard	Devon; 264/9 (50 overs)	v	Durham; 156/9 (50 overs)	The Fortfield, Sidmouth; Umpires: Raymond Allen and Nigel Piddock
Scorecard	Rebecca Bertrand 56 (84); Helen Fenby 4/52 (10 overs)		Laura Ellison 42 (–); Hazelle Garton 3/18 (10 overs)	The Fortfield, Sidmouth; Umpires: Raymond Allen and Nigel Piddock
Durham won the toss and elected to field.; Devon remain in Division Two.				The Fortfield, Sidmouth; Umpires: Raymond Allen and Nigel Piddock

== Division Three ==
=== Table ===
Team	Pld	W	L	T	A	Bat	Bowl	Ded	Pts	Avg.
Netherlands (PO)	8	8	0	0	0	31	27	0	138	17.25
Northamptonshire (PO)	8	6	2	0	0	24	30	0	114	14.25
Scotland	8	5	3	0	0	29	25	0	104	13.00
Leicestershire and Rutland	8	5	3	0	0	26	27	0	103	12.88
Hertfordshire	8	4	4	0	0	25	23	0	88	11.00
Derbyshire	8	3	5	0	0	21	19	0	70	8.75
Gloucestershire	8	2	5	0	1	22	19	0	61	8.71
Hampshire (PO)	8	2	6	0	0	21	21	0	62	7.75
Oxfordshire (PO)	8	0	7	0	1	13	18	0	31	4.43

Source: ECB Women's County Championship

=== Play-offs ===
1 September 2013	Netherlands; 205/9 (50 overs)	v	Northamptonshire; 135 (45.4 overs)	Netherlands won by 70 runs
Scorecard	Netherlands; 205/9 (50 overs)	v	Northamptonshire; 135 (45.4 overs)	Loxley Close, Wellesbourne; Umpires: Des Green and Mark Gumbley
Scorecard	Tessa van der Gun 73* (84); Millie Boddington 3/37 (7 overs)		Millie Boddington 29 (50); Marloes Braat 3/18 (8 overs)	Loxley Close, Wellesbourne; Umpires: Des Green and Mark Gumbley
Northamptonshire won the toss and elected to field.; Netherlands proceed to Division Two/Three play-off.				Loxley Close, Wellesbourne; Umpires: Des Green and Mark Gumbley

1 September 2013	Hampshire; 196/5 (45.3 overs)	v	Oxfordshire; 195/9 (50 overs)	Hampshire won by 5 wickets
Scorecard	Hampshire; 196/5 (45.3 overs)	v	Oxfordshire; 195/9 (50 overs)	The Quarters, Hursley; Umpires: Denis Emery and Chris Read
Scorecard	Jo Harfield 74* (107); Ellie Norton 2/43 (10 overs)		Abigail Flory 37 (44); Rachel Carrick 3/42 (9 overs)	The Quarters, Hursley; Umpires: Denis Emery and Chris Read
Oxfordshire won the toss and elected to bat.; Hampshire remain in Division Three.				The Quarters, Hursley; Umpires: Denis Emery and Chris Read

== Division Four ==
=== North & East ===
Team	Pld	W	L	T	A	Bat	Bowl	Ded	Pts	Avg.
Suffolk (PO)	4	4	0	0	0	11	16	0	67	16.75
Cumbria	4	3	1	0	0	12	12	0	54	13.50
Northumberland	4	1	2	0	1	7	8	0	25	8.33
Cambridgeshire and Huntingdonshire	4	1	2	0	1	5	9	0	24	8.00
Norfolk	4	0	4	0	0	7	8	0	15	3.75

Source: ECB Women's County Championship

=== South & West ===
Team	Pld	W	L	T	A	Bat	Bowl	Ded	Pts	Avg.
Cornwall (PO)	4	4	0	0	0	10	16	0	66	16.50
Wiltshire	4	2	2	0	0	12	13	0	45	11.25
Shropshire	4	2	2	0	0	9	14	0	43	10.75
Buckinghamshire	4	2	2	0	0	7	11	0	38	9.50
Dorset	4	0	4	0	0	4	5	0	9	2.25

Source: ECB Women's County Championship

=== Play-off ===
1 September 2013	Cornwall; 124 (44 overs)	v	Suffolk; 126 (42.2 overs)	Suffolk won by 2 runs
Scorecard	Cornwall; 124 (44 overs)	v	Suffolk; 126 (42.2 overs)	Campbell Park, Milton Keynes; Umpires: Graham Frost and Tom Heenan
Scorecard	Nicole Richards 23 (37); Penny Everett 3/30 (10 overs)		Bethan Absolon 31 (66); Jade Williams 3/13 (6 overs)	Campbell Park, Milton Keynes; Umpires: Graham Frost and Tom Heenan
Cornwall won the toss and elected to field.; Suffolk proceed to Division Three/Four play-off.				Campbell Park, Milton Keynes; Umpires: Graham Frost and Tom Heenan

== Promotion play-offs ==
The teams that won the Division Finals played against the team that lost the relegation play-off from the Division above for the chance of promotion.

15 September 2013	Essex	v	Somerset	Match Abandoned
Scorecard	Essex	v	Somerset	Upton Court Road, Slough
No toss.; No play was possible due to rain.; Essex remain in Division One.				Upton Court Road, Slough

15 September 2013	Durham; 122/8 (48.4 overs)	v	Netherlands; 121 (49.4 overs)	Durham won by 2 wickets
Scorecard	Durham; 122/8 (48.4 overs)	v	Netherlands; 121 (49.4 overs)	Loxley Close, Wellesbourne
Scorecard	Jane Riddell 30 (41); Esther de Lange 3/16 (9 overs)		Denise van Deventer 34 (98); Becky Glen 3/19 (9.4 overs)	Loxley Close, Wellesbourne
Durham won the toss and elected to field.; Durham remain in Division Two.				Loxley Close, Wellesbourne

15 September 2013	Oxfordshire; 176/9 (50 overs)	v	Suffolk; 47/8 (27 overs)	Oxfordshire won on faster scoring rate
Scorecard	Oxfordshire; 176/9 (50 overs)	v	Suffolk; 47/8 (27 overs)	Sadler's End, Sindlesham; Umpires: Raj Patel and Richard Wheeler
Scorecard	Genny Porter 60 (110); Danielle Lavender 3/25 (10 overs)		Sheldene Ford-Keeble 12* (45); Samantha Moore 3/12 (8 overs)	Sadler's End, Sindlesham; Umpires: Raj Patel and Richard Wheeler
Suffolk won the toss and elected to field.; Oxfordshire remain in Division Three.				Sadler's End, Sindlesham; Umpires: Raj Patel and Richard Wheeler

== Statistics ==
=== Most runs ===
Player	Team	Matches	Innings	Runs	Average	HS	100s	50s
Heather Knight	Berkshire	8	8	604	100.66	153*	2	3
Charlotte Edwards	Kent	7	7	485	97.00	128*	2	3
Alex MacDonald	Gloucestershire	8	7	468	117.00	105*	1	4
Lauren Winfield	Yorkshire	8	8	393	54.14	96	0	4
Harriet Leach	Leicestershire and Rutland	8	8	388	55.42	92*	0	4

Source: CricketArchive

=== Most wickets ===
Player	Team	Balls	Wickets	Average	BBI	5w
Jenny Withers	Somerset	439	20	10.85	3/4	0
Jasmine Titmuss	Lancashire	396	18	8.00	5/22	1
Rachael Petherick	Durham	393	18	10.16	6/17	1
Anje Lague	Hertfordshire	472	18	11.77	4/18	0
Thea Brookes	Worcestershire	390	18	12.38	4/26	0

Source: CricketArchive
