= Gloucestershire Women cricket team =

English county cricket team

Gloucestershire Women

Personnel
- Captain: Liv Daniels
- Coach: Fran Wilson

Team information
- Founded: Unknown First recorded match: 1935
- Home ground: Seat Unique Stadium
- Capacity: 7,500 – 17,500

History
- One Day Cup wins: 0
- T20 Blast wins: 0
- T20 County Cup wins: 0
- County Championship (2008-2019) wins: 0
- Women's County One Day Cup (2024) wins: 0
- T20 Cup (2009-2024) wins: 0 Overall, 2 Group
- Official website: Gloucestershire Cricket Board

The Gloucestershire Women's cricket team is the women's representative cricket team for the English historic county of Gloucestershire, currently competing in the second Tier of the English Women's domestic structure. They play the majority of their home games at the Bristol County Ground in the Bishopton area of North Bristol, with some games also taking place at the Cheltenham College Ground as part of the annual Cheltenham Cricket Festival. They are currently captained by Liv Daniels.

In 2019, they played in Division Three of the final season of the Women's County Championship, and in 2021 & 2023 won the South West Group of the Women's Twenty20 Cup. The 2025 season is Gloucestershire's first as a Tier 2 team in the restructured women's domestic setup. They were partnered with the regional side Western Storm.

== History ==
=== 1937–2006: Early History ===
Gloucestershire Women played their first recorded match in 1935, against Hampshire. Two years later, they drew a match against Australia as part of their tour of England. Since then, they played various one-off matches against other county sides and Second XIs.

=== 2007–2024: Women's County Championship ===
In 2007, Gloucestershire Women joined the County Challenge Cup, the feeder tier of the Women's County Championship, finishing 3rd in their group. The following season, they joined the full Championship, in Division Five South & West, again finishing third. Gloucestershire were promoted to Division Three in 2012, and except a brief spell in Division Four in 2015, have played there ever since. In 2017 they just missed out on promotion to Division Two, losing a play-off match to Essex by 6 wickets, after topping Division 3B. Meanwhile, in the Women's Twenty20 Cup, Gloucestershire gained two early promotions in the Midlands & North region in 2010 and 2011. After the competition took on a nationwide format in 2015, Gloucestershire have mainly played in Division Three, with brief spells in both Divisions Four and Two. In 2021, they competed in the South West Group of the Twenty20 Cup, and won the group, going unbeaten with 4 wins and 4 matches abandoned due to rain. Gloucestershire batter Chloe Skelton was the fifth-highest run-scorer across the competition, with 201 runs. In 2022, they finished bottom of Group 3 of the Twenty20 Cup. In the 2023 Women's Twenty20 Cup, the side won their group, finishing top of the initial group stage and beating Shropshire in the final. In 2024, the side finished 4th in their group in the Twenty20 Cup and 2nd in their group in the new ECB Women's County One-Day tournament.

=== 2025–: Tier 2 ===
As a part of the restructuring of Women's Domestic Cricket in England, Gloucestershire were placed in Tier 2 of the new Structure. Lauren Rowles, Head Coach of the England Men's Disability Team, was announced as the first Heach Coach of the new era. Multiple players, including 2024 Player's Player of the Year Emily Geach, 2024's top scorer Becca Halliday and BBC Test Match Special commentator Melissa Story were announced to be making the move into Tier 2 with the team, along with a cadre of new signings, including new Captain Liv Daniels and Seamer Chloe Barnard.

In their first Tier 2 game, in the Metro Bank One Day Cup, Gloucestershire notched their first win against Derbyshire, winning a rain-affected game by 9 runs. Their first Vitality Blast win came lter in the year, defeating Kent by 32 runs at Canterbury. The Shire ended the season placing 5th in the One Day Cup and 5th in the South Group in the Vitality Blast, and were knocked out in the first round of the T20 Cup by Glamorgan.

Former player and England International Fran Wilson took over as Head Coach ahead of the 2026 season. That season, the team made their first final post-restructuring, making the Final of the T20 Blast, falling to Glamorgan in the final after beating Kent earlier in the day.

== Players ==
=== Current squad ===
Based on appearances in the 2023 season. ‡ denotes players with international caps.

| No. | Name | Nat | Birth date | Batting style | Bowling style | Notes |
Batters
| 27 | Becca Halliday | England | 27 September 2001 (age 25) | Right-Handed | Right-Arm Off Break | |
| 94 | Maddie White | England | | Right-Handed | — | Part of the Elite Player Pathway |
All-rounders
| 4 | Izzy Patel | England | 21 November 2004 (age 21) | Right-Handed | Right-Arm Medium | |
| 9 | Emily Geach | England | 15 February 2004 (age 22) | Left-Handed | Right-Arm Medium | Vice-Captain |
| 16 | Liv Daniels | England | 23 February 2006 (age 20) | Right-Handed | Right-Arm Off-Break | Captain |
| 31 | Prarthana Reddy | England | 31 January 2008 (age 18) | Right-Handed | Right-Arm Leg-Break | |
| 32 | Melissa Story | England | 7 July 2000 (age 26) | Right-Handed | Right-Arm Medium | |
| 78 | Katie Dolman | England | 20 March 2004 (age 22) | Right Handed | Right-Arm Medium | |
| 81 | Chloe Brewer | England | 12 July 2002 (age 24) | Right-Handed | Right-Arm Medium | On Loan from Warwickshire |
| 85 | Izzy Storrar | England | 16 December 2006 (age 19) | Right-Handed | Right-Arm Medium-Fast | On Loan from Berkshire |
| 92 | Alice Hill | England | 28 March 2000 (age 26) | Right-Handed | Right-Arm Off-Break | |
| 98 | Amilie Munday | England | 9 October 2002 (age 24) | Right-Handed | Right-Arm Medium | On Loan from Devon |
Wicket-keepers
| 30 | Georgina Start | England | 2 January 1996 (age 30) | Right-Handed | — | |
| 66 | Meg Ahearne | England | 21 November 2004 (age 21) | Right Handed | — | |
Bowlers
| 35 | Alice Bird | England | 11 November 2005 (age 20) | Right-Handed | Right-Arm Medium | |
| 44 | Caitlin Belcher | England | 14 June 2004 (age 22) | Right-Handed | Right-Arm Fast-Medium | |
| 52 | Charlie Phillips | England | 5 February 1998 (age 28) | Right-Handed | Right-Arm Off--Break | |
| 82 | Bella Herring | England | 10 August 2009 (age 17) | Right-Handed | Right-Arm Medium | Part of the Elite Player Pathway |
| 84 | Abi Bryan | England | 28 April 2009 (age 17) | Right-Handed | Right-Arm Medium | Part of the Elite Player Pathway |
| 86 | Sophie Smith-Graham | England | 22 January 2008 (age 18) | Right-Handed | Right-Arm Medium | Part of the Elite Player Pathway |
| 95 | Charlotte Phillips | England | 4 March 1995 (age 31) | Right-Handed | Right-Arm Off-Break | |
Source: Updated: 3 August 2026

=== Notable players ===
Players who have played for Gloucestershire and played internationally are listed below, in order of first international appearance (given in brackets):

- (England) Fran Wilson (2010)
- (England) Danielle Gibson (2023)

== Seasons ==
=== Women's County Championship ===
| Season | Division | League standings | | | | | | | | Notes |
| Season | Division | P | W | L | T | A/C | BP | Pts | Pos | Notes |
|---|---|---|---|---|---|---|---|---|---|---|
| 2007 | County Challenge Cup G2 | 3 | 1 | 1 | 0 | 1 | 3 | 38 | 3rd | |
| 2008 | Division 5 S&W | 4 | 2 | 2 | 0 | 0 | 6 | 46 | 3rd | |
| 2009 | Division 5 S&W | 5 | 4 | 1 | 0 | 0 | 4 | 84 | 2nd | |
| 2010 | Division 5 S&W | 6 | 5 | 1 | 0 | 0 | 37 | 87 | 1st | |
| 2011 | Division 5 S&W | 8 | 6 | 0 | 0 | 2 | 46 | 106 | 1st | Promoted |
| 2012 | Division 3 | 8 | 2 | 0 | 0 | 6 | 15 | 35 | 2nd | |
| 2013 | Division 3 | 8 | 2 | 5 | 0 | 1 | 41 | 61 | 7th | |
| 2014 | Division 3 | 8 | 1 | 6 | 0 | 1 | 24 | 34 | 9th | Relegated |
| 2015 | Division 4 S&W | 5 | 4 | 0 | 0 | 1 | 31 | 71 | 1st | Promoted |
| 2016 | Division 3 | 8 | 5 | 1 | 0 | 2 | 37 | 87 | 3rd | |
| 2017 | Division 3B | 4 | 4 | 0 | 0 | 0 | 31 | 71 | 1st | Lost promotion playoff |
| 2018 | Division 3C | 6 | 4 | 2 | 0 | 0 | 41 | 81 | 2nd | |
| 2019 | Division 3C | 5 | 2 | 3 | 0 | 0 | 30 | 50 | 4th | |

=== Women's Twenty20 Cup ===
| Season | Division | League standings | | | | | | | | Notes |
| Season | Division | P | W | L | T | A/C | NRR | Pts | Pos | Notes |
|---|---|---|---|---|---|---|---|---|---|---|
| 2009 | Division 6 | 3 | 0 | 0 | 0 | 3 | – | 3 | 1st | |
| 2010 | Division M&N 4 | 2 | 1 | 0 | 1 | 0 | +0.69 | 3 | 1st | Promoted |
| 2011 | Division M&N 3 | 3 | 3 | 0 | 0 | 0 | +2.52 | 6 | 1st | Promoted |
| 2012 | Division M&N 2 | 3 | 1 | 1 | 0 | 1 | −1.45 | 2 | 3rd | Relegated |
| 2013 | Division M&N 3 | 2 | 1 | 1 | 0 | 0 | −0.49 | 2 | 2nd | |
| 2014 | Division 3A | 4 | 2 | 2 | 0 | 0 | +0.16 | 8 | 6th | |
| 2015 | Division 3 | 8 | 2 | 6 | 0 | 0 | −0.78 | 8 | 8th | Relegated |
| 2016 | Division 4B | 6 | 4 | 0 | 0 | 2 | +5.61 | 18 | 1st | |
| 2017 | Division 3A | 8 | 6 | 0 | 0 | 2 | +2.96 | 26 | 1st | Promoted |
| 2018 | Division 2 | 8 | 1 | 7 | 0 | 0 | −2.20 | 4 | 9th | Relegated |
| 2019 | Division 3A | 8 | 3 | 3 | 0 | 2 | −3.08 | 14 | 4th | |
| 2021 | South West | 8 | 4 | 0 | 0 | 4 | +0.78 | 20 | 1st | Group winners |
| 2022 | Group 3 | 6 | 0 | 6 | 0 | 0 | −2.47 | 0 | 4th | |
| 2023 | Group 3 | 6 | 3 | 0 | 0 | 3 | +2.82 | 15 | 1st | Group winners |
| 2024 | Group 4 | 8 | 4 | 2 | 0 | 2 | +2.48 | 77 | 4th | |

=== ECB Women's County One-Day ===
| Season | Group | League standings | | | | | | | | Notes |
| Season | Group | P | W | L | T | A/C | BP | Pts | Pos | Notes |
|---|---|---|---|---|---|---|---|---|---|---|
| 2024 | Group 3 | 4 | 4 | 0 | 0 | 0 | 4 | 20 | 2nd | |

== Honours ==
- Women's Twenty20 Cup:
  - Group winners (2) – 2021 & 2023

== See also ==
- Gloucestershire County Cricket Club
- Western Storm
