= Cumbria Women cricket team =

English county cricket team

Cumbria Women

Personnel
- Captain: Olivia Brinsden
- Coach: Colin Knight

Team information
- Founded: Unknown First recorded match: 2000
- Home ground: Various Including Park Side Road, Kendal

History
- WCC wins: 0
- T20 Cup wins: 0
- Official website: Cumbria Women

The Cumbria Women's cricket team is the women's representative cricket team for the English ceremonial county of Cumbria. They play their home games at various grounds across the county. In 2019, they played in Division 3 of the final season of the Women's County Championship, and have since competed in the Women's Twenty20 Cup. Cumbria have links with Lancashire, with some players playing for both sides, and they are partnered with the regional side North West Thunder.

== History ==
Cumbria Women's first recorded match was against Scotland Women in 2000, which they lost by 10 wickets. The following year, Cumbria joined the Emerging Counties competition, which acted as a feeder competition for the Women's County Championship, in which they competed for three seasons before joining its successor, the County Challenge Cup. Since then, in the Challenge Cup and when they joined the County Championship proper in 2008, Cumbria Women have remained in the bottom tier of competition. They also joined the Women's Twenty20 Cup for its inaugural year in 2009, and again have been consistently in the lowest division. They achieved one of their best finishes in 2019, finishing 2nd in Division 3C with 3 victories. In 2021, they competed in the North Group of the Twenty20 Cup, finishing bottom with no victories. They again finished bottom of their group in the 2022 and 2023 Twenty20 Cups. In 2024, the side finished 7th in their group in the Twenty20 Cup.

== Players ==
=== Current squad ===
Based on appearances in the 2023 season.

Name	Nationality	Apps	Notes				
Name	Nationality	Apps	Notes	Olivia Brinsden	England	2	Club captain
Grace Airey	England	4					
Carenza Curwen	England	2					
Sarah-Jayne Earl	England	2					
Jenny Fallows	England	4					
Kate Field	England	4					
Mahika Gaur ‡	England (Note: Gaur has also played international cricket for the United Arab Emirates.)	2					
Ruby Hutchison	England	4	Wicket-keeper				
Maeve Jones	England	2					
Tilly Kesteven	England	4					
Lily King	England	2					
S Parker	England	2					
Bethan Robinson	England	3					
Hannah Snape	England	2	Dual-registration with Lancashire				
Emily Tucker	Scotland	2					
Maddie Wood	England	4					

=== Notable players ===
Players who have played for Cumbria and played internationally are listed below, in order of first international appearance (given in brackets):

- (Scotland) Hannah Rainey (2018)
- (United Arab Emirates) (England) Mahika Gaur (2019) (Note: Gaur has represented both the United Arab Emirates and England in international cricket.)
- (England) Seren Smale (2024)

== Seasons ==
=== Women's County Championship ===
Season	Division	League standings								Notes
Season	Division	P	W	L	T	A/C	BP	Pts	Pos	Notes
2001	Emerging Counties	2	-	-	-	-	-	-	Unknown	
2002	Emerging Counties	2	0	2	0	0	12.5	12.5	3rd	
2003	Emerging Counties	2	0	2	0	0	10.5	10.5	3rd	
2004	County Challenge Cup G2	3	1	2	0	0	19.5	31.5	2nd	
2005	County Challenge Cup G1	2	0	2	0	0	6.5	6.5	4th	
2006	County Challenge Cup G1	3	1	2	0	0	1	21	3rd	
2007	County Challenge Cup G4	3	1	2	0	0	7	32	3rd	
2008	Division 5N	3	1	2	0	0	1	21	3rd	
2009	Division 5 N&E	3	2	1	0	0	5	45	1st	
2010	Division 5N	7	3	4	0	0	31	61	3rd	
2011	Division 5N	4	1	3	0	0	19	24	4th	
2012	Division 4 N&E	4	1	3	0	0	12	22	4th	
2013	Division 4 N&E	4	3	1	0	0	24	54	2nd	
2014	Division 4 N&E	4	2	2	0	0	22	42	2nd	
2015	Division 4 N&E	4	3	1	0	0	25	55	2nd	
2016	Division 4 N&E	5	1	2	0	2	18	28	5th	
2017	Division 3A	6	0	6	0	0	0	-15	4th	
2018	Division 3A	6	2	4	0	0	31	51	3rd	
2019	Division 3A	6	2	3	0	1	23	43	5th	

=== Women's Twenty20 Cup ===
Season	Division	League standings								Notes
Season	Division	P	W	L	T	A/C	NRR	Pts	Pos	Notes
2009	Division 7	3	0	0	0	3	–	3	1st	
2010	Division M&N 3	2	0	2	0	0	−1.36	0	3rd	
2011	Division M&N 3	3	0	3	0	0	−1.91	0	4th	
2012	Division M&N 3	3	0	3	0	0	−1.54	0	4th	Relegated
2013	Division M&N 4	3	1	2	0	0	−0.35	2	2nd	
2014	Division 4C	4	4	0	0	0	+2.50	16	3rd	
2015	Division 4C	6	2	1	0	3	+0.19	11	2nd	
2016	Division 4C	6	2	4	0	0	−0.36	8	3rd	
2017	Division 3B	8	0	8	0	0	−2.55	0	6th	
2018	Division 3B	8	2	6	0	0	−1.70	8	6th	
2019	Division 3C	8	3	3	0	2	−0.13	14	2nd	
2021	North	8	0	6	0	2	−3.95	2	6th	
2022	Group 1	6	0	6	0	0	−1.77	0	7th	
2023	Group 1	6	0	2	0	4	−5.90	4	7th	
2024	Group 1	7	1	4	0	2	–3.68	36	7th	

== See also ==
- Cumbria County Cricket Club
- North West Thunder
