= 2017 Women's County Championship =

- Administrator: England and Wales Cricket Board
- Cricket format: 50 over
- Tournament format: League system
- Champions: Lancashire (1st title)
- Participants: 36
- Most runs: Suzie Bates (494)
- Most wickets: Sophie Ecclestone (27)

The 2017 Women's County One-Day Championship was the 21st cricket Women's County Championship season. It ran from April to August and saw 33 county teams and teams representing Scotland, Wales and the Netherlands compete in a series of divisions. Lancashire Women won the County Championship as winners of the top division with Yorkshire finishing runners-up. This was Lancashire's first Championship, and their victory saw them complete the double, after winning the Twenty20 Cup earlier in the season.

The tournament ran alongside the 2017 Women's Twenty20 Cup, and followed by the 2017 Women's Cricket Super League, a professional tournament competed for by franchise teams.

== Competition format ==
The championship works on a points system, the winner being the team with most average points of completed games in the first division. The points are currently awarded as follows:

Win: 10 points + bonus points.
Tie: 5 points + bonus points.
Loss: Bonus points.
Abandoned or cancelled: Match not counted to average.

Bonus points are collected for batting and bowling. The bonus points for each match are retained if the match is completed.

- Batting

1.50 runs per over (RPO) or more: 1 point
2 RPO or more: 2 points
3 RPO or more: 3 points
4 RPO or more: 4 points

- Bowling

3-4 wickets taken: 1 point
5-6 wickets taken: 2 points
7-8 wickets taken: 3 points
9-10 wickets taken: 4 points

== Teams ==
The 2017 Championship was divided into three divisions: Division One and Division Two with eight teams each, and Division Three with 20 teams divided into 4 groups.

Teams in each group played each other once, except Division 3 Group A teams which played each other twice.

Division One	Berkshire	Kent	Lancashire	Middlesex	Nottinghamshire	Sussex	Warwickshire	Yorkshire
Division Two	Derbyshire	Devon	Hampshire	Somerset	Surrey	Wales	Staffordshire	Worcestershire
Division Three - Group A	Cumbria	Durham	Northumberland	Scotland				
Division Three - Group B	Cornwall	Dorset	Gloucestershire	Oxfordshire	Wiltshire			
Division Three - Group C	Buckinghamshire	Cambridgeshire and Huntingdonshire	Essex	Hertfordshire	Netherlands	Shropshire		
Division Three - Group D	Leicestershire and Rutland	Lincolnshire	Norfolk	Northamptonshire	Suffolk			

== Division One ==
Team	Pld	W	L	T	A	Bat	Bowl	Ded	Pts	Avg.
Lancashire (C)	7	5	2	0	0	23	26	0	99	14.14
Yorkshire	7	5	2	0	0	23	25	0	98	14
Warwickshire	7	5	2	0	0	21	25	0	96	13.71
Nottinghamshire	7	4	3	0	0	21	27	0	88	12.57
Middlesex	7	3	4	0	0	20	26	0	76	10.86
Kent	7	3	4	0	0	20	21	0	71	10.14
Sussex (R)	7	3	4	0	0	17	19	0	66	9.43
Berkshire (R)	7	0	7	0	0	11	12	0	23	3.29

As of 28 August 2017 — Source: ECB Women's County Championship

== Division Two ==
Team	Pld	W	L	T	A	Bat	Bowl	Ded	Pts	Avg.
Hampshire (P)	7	6	1	0	0	27	24	0	111	15.86
Somerset (P)	7	5	1	0	1	22	19	0	91	15.17
Devon	7	5	2	0	0	21	25	0	96	13.71
Surrey	7	4	3	0	0	23	24	0	87	12.43
Wales	7	3	4	0	0	19	23	0	72	10.29
Derbyshire	7	3	4	0	0	19	22	0	71	10.14
Worcestershire (R)	7	1	5	0	1	14	12	0	36	6
Staffordshire (R)	7	0	7	0	0	11	13	0	24	3.43

As of 28 August 2017 — Source: ECB Women's County Championship

== Division Three ==
=== Group A ===
Team	Pld	W	L	T	A	LC	WC	Bat	Bowl	Ded	Pts	Avg.
Durham (PO)	6	4	0	0	1	0	1	12	14	0	76	15.2
Scotland	6	3	2	0	0	0	1	9	16	0	65	10.83
Northumberland	6	1	3	0	1	0	1	5	8	0	33	6.6
Cumbria	6	0	3	0	0	3	0	0	0	0	-15	-2.5

As of 23 July 2017 — Source: ECB Women's County Championship

=== Group B ===
Team	Pld	W	L	T	A	Bat	Bowl	Ded	Pts	Avg.
Gloucestershire (PO)	4	4	0	0	0	15	16	0	71	17.75
Oxfordshire	4	3	1	0	0	13	15	0	58	14.5
Cornwall	4	1	2	1	0	7	15	0	37	9.25
Dorset	4	1	3	0	0	7	7	0	24	6
Wiltshire	4	0	3	1	0	7	8	0	20	5

As of 29 May 2017 — Source: ECB Women's County Championship

=== Group C ===
Team	Pld	W	L	T	A	Bat	Bowl	Ded	Pts	Avg.
Essex (PO)	5	5	0	0	0	20	17	0	87	17.4
Netherlands	5	4	1	0	0	14	15	0	69	13.8
Shropshire	5	3	2	0	0	16	16	0	62	12.4
Buckinghamshire	5	2	3	0	0	8	15	0	43	8.6
Hertfordshire	5	1	4	0	0	9	11	0	30	6
Cambridgeshire and Huntingdonshire	5	0	5	0	0	5	14	0	19	3.8

As of 29 May 2017 — Source: ECB Women's County Championship

=== Group D ===
Team	Pld	W	L	T	A	Bat	Bowl	Ded	Pts	Avg.
Northamptonshire (PO)	4	3	0	0	1	8	12	0	50	16.67
Leicestershire and Rutland	4	2	1	0	1	10	11	0	41	13.67
Suffolk	4	2	2	0	0	11	11	0	42	10.5
Lincolnshire	4	2	2	0	0	9	12	0	41	10.25
Norfolk	4	0	4	0	0	7	6	0	13	3.25

As of 29 May 2017 — Source: ECB Women's County Championship

=== Promotion play-offs ===
27 August 2017	Durham; 90 (39.1 overs)	v	Northamptonshire; 91/5 (26.2 overs)	Northamptonshire won by 5 wickets
10:45; Scorecard	Durham; 90 (39.1 overs)	v	Northamptonshire; 91/5 (26.2 overs)	Durham City CC, Durham; Umpires: Peter Brown and Paul Jordison
10:45; Scorecard	Laura Ellison 20 (75); Bethan Solomon 3/9 (4.1 overs)		Alicia Presland 49 (56); Helen Fenby 2/19 (6 overs)	Durham City CC, Durham; Umpires: Peter Brown and Paul Jordison
Northamptonshire won the toss and elected to field.; Northamptonshire is promoted to 2018 Women's County Championship Division Two.				Durham City CC, Durham; Umpires: Peter Brown and Paul Jordison

27 August 2017	Gloucestershire; 229/9 (50 overs)	v	Essex; 231/4 (43 overs)	Essex won by 6 wickets
11:00; Scorecard	Gloucestershire; 229/9 (50 overs)	v	Essex; 231/4 (43 overs)	Dumbleton; Umpires: Paul Evans and Lyn Hall
11:00; Scorecard	Alex MacDonald 81 (111); Hannah Jeffery 3/25 (10 overs)		Cordelia Griffith 113* (111); Danielle Gibson 1/17 (5 overs)	Dumbleton; Umpires: Paul Evans and Lyn Hall
Gloucestershire won the toss and elected to bat.; Essex is promoted to 2018 Women's County Championship Division Two.				Dumbleton; Umpires: Paul Evans and Lyn Hall

== Statistics ==
=== Most runs ===
Player	Team	Matches	Innings	Runs	Average	HS	100s	50s
Suzie Bates	Hampshire	7	7	494	164.66	139*	2	3
Sophie Luff	Somerset	6	6	411	137.00	118*	2	2
Sophie Pout	Surrey	7	7	274	39.14	108	1	1
Sonia Odedra	Nottinghamshire	7	7	253	42.16	86	0	2
Beth Morgan	Middlesex	7	7	245	35.00	80	0	1

Source: CricketArchive

=== Most wickets ===
Player	Team	Balls	Wickets	Average	BBI	5w
Sophie Ecclestone	Lancashire	408	27	6.69	6/12	2
Katie Levick	Yorkshire	360	21	7.66	6/28	1
Hannah Jeffery	Essex	229	14	5.92	4/6	0
Anisha Patel	Warwickshire	281	14	9.78	6/17	1
Nicole Richards	Somerset	296	14	9.92	5/22	1

Source: CricketArchive
