= Norfolk Women cricket team =

English county cricket team

Norfolk Women

Personnel
- Captain: Ellie Stanley

Team information
- Founded: Unknown First recorded match: 1957
- Home ground: Various including Highfield Lane, Fakenham

History
- WCC wins: 0
- T20 Cup wins: 0
- Official website: Norfolk Cricket Board

The Norfolk Women's cricket team is the women's representative cricket team for the English historic county of Norfolk. They play their home games at various grounds across the county, and are captained by Ellie Stanley. In 2019, they played in Division Three of the final season of the Women's County Championship, and have since competed in the Women's Twenty20 Cup. They are partnered with the regional side Sunrisers.

== History ==
Norfolk Women joined the national women's cricket structure in 2002, as part of the Emerging Counties division: in their first season they played two games, winning one and losing one. The topped the Emerging Counties league in 2003, and joined the County Challenge Cup in 2004. Norfolk have consistently played in the lower levels of the Women's County Championship, although they did gain promotions in 2008 and 2015. In recent years, they have played in Division 3 of the Championship.

Norfolk have performed similarly in the Women's Twenty20 Cup, having always played in the bottom tier of the competition since 2010. Their most successful season was in 2017, when they won five of their eight games. In 2020, after the cancellation of the planned season due to the COVID-19 pandemic, Norfolk competed in the East of England Championship. In 2021, they competed in the East Group of the Twenty20 Cup, but finished bottom with no wins, as well as finishing 5th in the East of England Championship. They again finished bottom of their group in the 2022 Women's Twenty20 Cup, and finished sixth out of seven in the East of England Championship. They finished third in their group in the 2023 Women's Twenty20 Cup, before finishing fifth out of six in the East of England Championship. In 2024, the side finished 5th in their group in the Twenty20 Cup and 8th in their group in the new ECB Women's County One-Day tournament.

== Seasons ==
=== Women's County Championship ===
Season	Division	League standings								Notes
Season	Division	P	W	L	T	A/C	BP	Pts	Pos	Notes
2002	Emerging Counties	2	1	1	0	0	17.5	29.5	2nd	
2003	Emerging Counties	2	2	0	0	0	18	42	1st	
2004	County Challenge Cup G2	3	0	2	0	1	14.5	25.5	4th	
2005	County Challenge Cup G2	3	2	1	0	0	24	48	2nd	
2006	County Challenge Cup G2	3	1	2	0	0	10	30	3rd	
2007	County Challenge Cup G3	3	1	2	0	0	6	31	3rd	
2008	Division 5 L&E	3	2	0	0	1	0	50	1st	Promoted
2009	Division 4	10	1	9	0	0	20	40	6th	Relegated
2010	Division 5E	6	3	2	0	1	24	54	2nd	
2011	Division 5E	5	1	4	0	0	27	37	4th	
2012	Division 4 N&E	4	1	3	0	0	12	17	5th	
2013	Division 4 N&E	4	0	4	0	0	15	15	5th	
2014	Division 4 N&E	4	2	2	0	0	22	42	3rd	
2015	Division 4 N&E	4	4	0	0	0	28	68	1st	Promoted
2016	Division 3	8	0	8	0	0	27	27	9th	
2017	Division 3D	4	0	4	0	0	13	13	5th	
2018	Division 3D	6	2	4	0	0	25	45	3rd	
2019	Division 3B	5	3	2	0	0	27	57	3rd	

=== Women's Twenty20 Cup ===
Season	Division	League standings								Notes
Season	Division	P	W	L	T	A/C	NRR	Pts	Pos	Notes
2009	Division 5	3	1	2	0	0	+0.99	2	3rd	
2010	Division S3	2	1	1	0	0	−0.09	2	2nd	
2011	Division S3	2	1	1	0	0	−0.74	2	3rd	
2012	Division S3	3	1	2	0	0	−2.47	2	3rd	
2013	Division S3	2	1	1	0	0	+0.15	2	2nd	
2014	Division 4B	3	3	0	0	0	+1.27	12	3rd	
2015	Division 4A	4	1	3	0	0	−2.20	4	3rd	
2016	Division 4A	6	3	3	0	0	+0.90	12	2nd	
2017	Division 3C	8	5	3	0	0	+0.36	20	3rd	
2018	Division 3C	8	4	4	0	0	−0.78	16	4th	
2019	Division 3B	8	3	5	0	0	−0.44	12	4th	
2021	East	8	0	6	0	2	−2.34	2	6th	
2022	Group 4	6	0	6	0	0	−1.79	0	4th	
2023	Group 4	6	1	0	0	5	+1.05	9	3rd	
2024	Group 2	8	3	3	0	2	–2.14	63	5th	

=== ECB Women's County One-Day ===
Season	Group	League standings								Notes
Season	Group	P	W	L	T	A/C	BP	Pts	Pos	Notes
2024	Group 2	4	1	3	0	0	0	4	8th	

== See also ==
- Norfolk County Cricket Club
- Sunrisers (women's cricket)
