= Sussex Women cricket team =

English women's cricket team

Sussex Women

Personnel
- Captain: Georgia Adams
- Coach: Alexia Walker

Team information
- Founded: Unknown First recorded match: 1936
- Home ground: Various including Brighton Aldridge Community Academy Sports Ground, Brighton

History
- WCC wins: 6
- T20 Cup wins: 2
- Official website: Sussex Cricket

The Sussex Women's cricket team is the women's representative cricket team for the English historic county of Sussex. They play their home games at various grounds across the county, including Brighton Aldridge Community Academy Sports Ground and the County Cricket Ground, Hove. They are captained by Georgia Adams. They have won 6 Women's County Championships and 2 Women's Twenty20 Cups in their history. They are partnered with the regional side Southern Vipers.

== History ==
=== 1936–1996: Early History ===
Sussex Women played their first recorded match in 1936, against Surrey. They went on to play various one-off matches, often against nearby teams such as Middlesex, as well as against touring sides such as New Zealand. Sussex joined the Women's Area Championship in 1980, and played in the competition until it was discontinued in 1996.

=== 1997– : Women's County Championship ===
Sussex joined the Women's County Championship for its inaugural season in 1997, finishing bottom of Division Two with one win. After a brief stint in the top division in 2000, Sussex became an established Division One side from 2002 onwards, and won their first title in 2003. This began a prosperous era for Sussex Women, going on to be County Champions three times in a row, with victories in 2004 and 2005. Other the next eight seasons, until 2013, Sussex never dropped out of the top 3 of Division One, and recorded three more title wins, in 2008, 2010 and 2013. Key to this success was players such as Rosalie Birch, Alexia Walker and Clare Connor, who were regularly top run-scorers for the side.

Sussex also joined the Women's Twenty20 Cup for its inaugural season in 2009, and qualified for the knockout stages in every season from 2010 to 2013. Sussex won the title in 2012, beating Berkshire by ten wickets in the final: bowling their opponents out for 52, with Sussex bowler Izi Noakes taking 3/5. Sussex went on to win their second T20 title in 2015, topping Division One with six wins from eight games, and finishing ahead of Yorkshire and Kent on Net Run Rate.

In recent years, Sussex have struggled to replicate their early success in the County Championship, and were relegated from Division One in 2017. They managed to bounce straight back however, winning Division Two in 2018, and finished 3rd in Division One in 2019. In 2021, they competed in the South East Group of the Twenty20 Cup, finishing 4th with 3 victories, as well as joining the Women's London Championship for its second season, in which they finished 4th out of 5 teams. In 2022, they won their group of the Twenty20 Cup, topping the initial group stage before beating Kent in the final of the group Finals Day. They also joined the South Central Counties Cup in 2022, finishing fifth out of six teams in the inaugural edition. In 2023, they won their group of the 2023 Women's Twenty20 Cup, defeating Hampshire in the final, and the South Central Counties Cup, topping the group on head-to-head record. In 2024, the side topped their group in both the Twenty20 Cup and the new ECB Women's County One-Day tournament.

== Players ==
=== Current squad ===
Based on appearances in the 2023 season. ‡ denotes players with international caps.

| Name | Nationality | Birth date | Batting style | Bowling style | Notes |
Batters
| Maya Champion | England | 28 November 1995 (age 29) | Unknown | Unknown | |
| Izzy Collis | England | 22 September 1996 (age 28) | Right-handed | Right-arm leg break | |
| Phoebe Wilkinson | England | 22 March 2000 (age 25) | Unknown | Unknown | |
| Rachel King | England | 1 October 2004 (age 20) | Right-handed | Unknown | |
All-rounders
| Regina Suddahazai ‡ | Italy | 18 June 2005 (age 19) | Right-handed | Right-arm medium | |
Wicket-keepers
| Mollie Adams | England | 12 April 2007 (age 17) | Right-handed | Right-arm off break | |
| Lucy Western | England | 27 November 1998 (age 26) | Right-handed | – | |
Bowlers
| Anna Buckle | England | 12 February 1996 (age 29) | Unknown | Unknown | |
| Indigo Gentry | England | 10 December 2002 (age 22) | Right-handed | Right-arm medium | |
| Chiara Green | England | 18 October 1993 (age 31) | Right-handed | Right-arm off break | |
| Beth Harvey | England | 30 July 1998 (age 26) | Right-handed | Right-arm off break | |
| Tia Joseph | England | Unknown | Unknown | Unknown | |
| Faye Mullins | England | 30 November 2000 (age 24) | Unknown | Unknown | |
| Hope Mullins | England | 7 July 2000 (age 24) | Unknown | Unknown | |
| Alice Noakes | England | 6 January 2007 (age 18) | Right-handed | Right-arm medium | |

=== Notable players ===
Players who have played for Sussex and played internationally are listed below, in order of first international appearance (given in brackets):

- (England) Doris Turner (1934)
- (England) Betty Birch (1951)
- (England) Jean Cummins (1954)
- (England) Kay Green (1954)
- (England) Helene Hegarty (1954)
- (England) Anne Sanders (1954)
- (England) Helen Sharpe (1957)
- (England) Josephine Batson (1958)
- (England) Barbara Pont (1960)
- (England) Shirley Hodges (1969)
- (England) Shirley Ellis (1973)
- (England) Jan Southgate (1976)
- (England) Jan Brittin (1979)
- (England) Helen Stother (1982)
- (England) Jane Powell (1984)
- (England) Lesley Cooke (1986)
- (England) Joan Lee (1986)
- (England) Elaine Wulcko (1987)
- (Denmark) Janni Jønsson (1989)
- (England) Sarah-Jane Cook (1990)
- (England) Clare Connor (1995)
- (New Zealand) Haidee Tiffen (1999)
- (England) Arran Brindle (1999)
- (England) Caroline Atkins (2001)
- (England) Kate Oakenfold (2001)
- (England) Alexia Walker (2001)
- (England) Mandie Godliman (2002)
- (New Zealand) Aimee Watkins (2002)
- (New Zealand) Sara McGlashan (2002)
- (England) Rosalie Birch (2003)
- (England) Holly Colvin (2005)
- (England) Sarah Taylor (2006)
- (England) Laura Marsh (2006)
- (South Africa) Mignon du Preez (2007)
- (England) Charlie Russell (2007)
- (Australia) Erin Osborne (2009)
- (England) Danni Wyatt (2010)
- (England) Georgia Elwiss (2011)
- (England) Linsey Smith (2018)
- (England) Freya Davies (2019)
- (United States) Tara Norris (2021)
- (England) Freya Kemp (2022)
- (England) Paige Scholfield (2024)
- (England) Georgia Adams (2024)

== Seasons ==
=== Women's County Championship ===
| Season | Division | League standings | | | | | | | | Notes |
| Season | Division | P | W | L | T | A/C | BP | Pts | Pos | Notes |
|---|---|---|---|---|---|---|---|---|---|---|
| 1997 | Division 2 | 5 | 1 | 4 | 0 | 0 | 25 | 37 | 6th | |
| 1998 | Division 2 | 5 | 2 | 3 | 0 | 0 | 31 | 55 | 4th | |
| 1999 | Division 2 | 5 | 5 | 0 | 0 | 0 | 39 | 99 | 1st | Promoted |
| 2000 | Division 1 | 5 | 1 | 4 | 0 | 0 | 29.5 | 41.5 | 6th | Relegated |
| 2001 | Division 2 | 5 | 5 | 0 | 0 | 0 | 43 | 103 | 1st | Promoted |
| 2002 | Division 1 | 5 | 2 | 1 | 0 | 2 | 21 | 67 | 3rd | |
| 2003 | Division 1 | 5 | 4 | 1 | 0 | 0 | 28.5 | 86.5 | 1st | Champions |
| 2004 | Division 1 | 5 | 5 | 0 | 0 | 0 | 46 | 106 | 1st | Champions |
| 2005 | Division 1 | 6 | 3 | 1 | 0 | 2 | 30 | 88 | 1st | Champions |
| 2006 | Division 1 | 6 | 4 | 1 | 0 | 1 | 1 | 85 | 2nd | |
| 2007 | Division 1 | 6 | 4 | 1 | 0 | 1 | 2 | 112 | 2nd | |
| 2008 | Division 1 | 6 | 5 | 0 | 0 | 1 | 1 | 107 | 1st | Champions |
| 2009 | Division 1 | 10 | 8 | 2 | 0 | 0 | 4 | 164 | 2nd | |
| 2010 | Division 1 | 10 | 8 | 2 | 0 | 0 | 60 | 140 | 1st | Champions |
| 2011 | Division 1 | 10 | 7 | 2 | 0 | 1 | 57 | 127 | 2nd | |
| 2012 | Division 1 | 8 | 5 | 0 | 0 | 3 | 37 | 87 | 3rd | |
| 2013 | Division 1 | 8 | 6 | 2 | 0 | 0 | 56 | 116 | 1st | Champions |
| 2014 | Division 1 | 8 | 3 | 3 | 0 | 2 | 38 | 68 | 5th | |
| 2015 | Division 1 | 8 | 4 | 2 | 1 | 1 | 49 | 94 | 3rd | |
| 2016 | Division 1 | 8 | 4 | 2 | 0 | 2 | 41 | 81 | 2nd | |
| 2017 | Division 1 | 7 | 3 | 4 | 0 | 0 | 36 | 66 | 7th | Relegated |
| 2018 | Division 2 | 7 | 5 | 1 | 0 | 1 | 45 | 95 | 1st | Promoted |
| 2019 | Division 1 | 7 | 4 | 3 | 0 | 0 | 45 | 85 | 3rd | |

=== Women's Twenty20 Cup ===
| Season | Division | League standings | | | | | | | | Notes |
| Season | Division | P | W | L | T | A/C | NRR | Pts | Pos | Notes |
|---|---|---|---|---|---|---|---|---|---|---|
| 2009 | Division 1 | 3 | 0 | 1 | 0 | 2 | −1.05 | 2 | 4th | |
| 2010 | Division S1 | 3 | 2 | 1 | 0 | 0 | +2.30 | 4 | 2nd | Lost semi-final |
| 2011 | Division S1 | 3 | 3 | 0 | 0 | 0 | +2.17 | 4 | 2nd | Lost semi-final |
| 2012 | Division S1 | 3 | 2 | 0 | 0 | 1 | +3.03 | 5 | 1st | Champions |
| 2013 | Division S1 | 3 | 2 | 1 | 0 | 0 | +1.53 | 4 | 1st | Runners-up |
| 2014 | Division 1A | 4 | 3 | 1 | 0 | 0 | +0.20 | 12 | 5th | |
| 2015 | Division 1 | 8 | 6 | 2 | 0 | 0 | +0.56 | 24 | 1st | Champions |
| 2016 | Division 1 | 7 | 2 | 3 | 0 | 2 | −0.07 | 10 | 7th | |
| 2017 | Division 1 | 8 | 4 | 2 | 0 | 2 | +0.54 | 18 | 3rd | |
| 2018 | Division 1 | 8 | 6 | 2 | 0 | 0 | +1.19 | 24 | 2nd | |
| 2019 | Division 1 | 8 | 3 | 4 | 0 | 1 | +0.30 | 13 | 6th | |
| 2021 | South East | 8 | 3 | 3 | 0 | 2 | –0.17 | 14 | 4th | |
| 2022 | Group 6 | 6 | 5 | 1 | 0 | 0 | +0.91 | 20 | 1st | Group winners |
| 2023 | Group 5 | 6 | 3 | 1 | 0 | 2 | +0.16 | 14 | 2nd | Group winners |
| 2024 | Group 3 | 8 | 6 | 1 | 0 | 1 | +1.09 | 92 | 1st | |

=== ECB Women's County One-Day ===
| Season | Group | League standings | | | | | | | | Notes |
| Season | Group | P | W | L | T | A/C | BP | Pts | Pos | Notes |
|---|---|---|---|---|---|---|---|---|---|---|
| 2024 | Group 4 | 4 | 3 | 0 | 0 | 1 | 1 | 14 | 1st | Group winners |

== Honours ==
- County Championship:
  - Division One Champions (6) – 2003, 2004, 2005, 2008, 2010, 2013
  - Division Two Champions (3) – 1999, 2001, 2018
- Women's Twenty20 Cup:
  - Champions (2) – 2012, 2015
  - Group winners (2) – 2022 & 2023
- ECB Women's County One-Day:
  - Group winners (1) – 2024

== See also ==
- Sussex County Cricket Club
- Southern Vipers
