= 2004 Women's County Championship =

- Administrator(s): England and Wales Cricket Board
- Cricket format: 50 over
- Tournament format(s): League system
- Champions: Sussex (2nd title)
- Participants: 24
- Most runs: Charlotte Edwards (308)
- Most wickets: Heather Booth (12)

The 2004 Women's County One-Day Championship was the 8th cricket Women's County Championship season. It ran from May to August and saw 23 county teams plus Wales compete in a series of divisions. Sussex Women won the County Championship as winners of the top division, their second title in two years.

== Competition format ==
Teams played matches within a series of divisions with the winners of the top division being crowned County Champions. Matches were played using a one day format with 50 overs per side.

The championship works on a points system with positions within the divisions being based on the total points. Points were awarded as follows:

Win: 12 points.
Tie: 6 points.
Loss: Bonus points.
No Result: 11 points.
Abandoned: 11 points.

Up to five batting and five bowling points per side were also available.

== Teams ==
The 2004 Championship was divided into two tiers: the County Championship and the County Challenge Cup. The County Championship consisted of two divisions of six teams, whilst the Challenge Cup consisted of three groups of four teams, on equal standing, with the winners proceeding to a play-off round for promotion to the County Championship.

Teams played each other once.

=== County Championship ===
Division One	Kent	Lancashire	Nottinghamshire	Surrey	Sussex	Yorkshire
Division Two	Berkshire	Durham	Hampshire	Middlesex	Somerset	Staffordshire

=== County Challenge Cup ===
Group 1	Cheshire	Cumbria	Derbyshire	Leicestershire
Group 2	Essex	Hertfordshire	Norfolk	Northamptonshire
Group 3	Wales	Warwickshire	Wiltshire	Worcestershire

== County Championship ==
=== Division One ===
Team	Pld	W	L	T	A	Bat	Bowl	Ded	Pts
Sussex (C)	5	5	0	0	0	21.5	24.5	0	106
Kent	5	4	1	0	0	21	22.5	0	91.5
Yorkshire	5	3	2	0	0	17	19.5	0	72.5
Lancashire	5	2	3	0	0	13.5	20.5	0	58
Nottinghamshire (R)	5	1	4	0	0	18.5	16	0	46.5
Surrey (R)	5	0	5	0	0	15.5	10.5	0	26

Source: ECB Women's County Championship

=== Division Two ===
Team	Pld	W	L	T	A	Bat	Bowl	Ded	Pts
Somerset	5	4	1	0	0	19.5	21.5	0	89
Berkshire	5	4	1	0	0	19.5	21	0	88.5
Staffordshire	5	3	2	0	0	16	20.5	0	72.5
Hampshire	5	2	3	0	0	14.5	20.5	0	72.5
Middlesex	5	2	3	0	0	14.5	17	0	55.5
Durham (R)	5	0	5	0	0	10.5	12.5	0	23

Source: ECB Women's County Championship

== County Challenge Cup ==
=== Group 1 ===
Team	Pld	W	L	T	A	Bat	Bowl	Ded	Pts
Cheshire (PO)	3	3	0	0	0	13.5	14	0	63.5
Cumbria	3	1	2	0	0	9	10.5	0	31.5
Derbyshire	2	1	1	0	0	5.5	8.5	0	26
Leicestershire	2	0	2	0	0	4.5	2	0	6.5

Source: ECB Women's County Championship

=== Group 2 ===
Team	Pld	W	L	T	A	Bat	Bowl	Ded	Pts
Northamptonshire (PO)	3	2	0	0	1	8	10	0	53
Hertfordshire	2	1	1	0	0	6.5	8	0	26.5
Essex	2	1	1	0	0	4.5	9.5	0	26
Norfolk	3	0	2	0	1	5.5	9	0	25.5

Source: ECB Women's County Championship

=== Group 3 ===
Team	Pld	W	L	T	A	Bat	Bowl	Ded	Pts
Warwickshire (PO)	3	3	0	0	0	11.5	15	0	62.5
Worcestershire	3	2	1	0	0	12	13	0	49
Wales	3	1	2	0	0	10	11	0	33
Wiltshire	3	0	3	0	0	6	8	0	14

Source: ECB Women's County Championship

=== Play-off ===
Team	Pld	W	L	T	A	Bat	Bowl	Ded	Pts
Cheshire (P)	2	2	0	0	0	6.5	10	0	40.5
Warwickshire	2	1	1	0	0	5	10	0	27
Northamptonshire	2	0	2	0	0	4	5	0	9

Source: Cricket Archive

== Statistics ==
=== Most runs ===
Player	Team	Matches	Innings	Runs	Average	HS	100s	50s
Charlotte Edwards	Kent	5	5	308	77.00	120	1	2
Rosalie Birch	Sussex	5	5	247	61.75	100	1	1
Claire Taylor	Berkshire	5	5	247	61.75	112	1	1
Jenny Wallace	Somerset	5	5	242	121.00	93*	0	1
Aimee Watkins	Sussex	5	5	232	77.33	114*	1	1

Source: CricketArchive

=== Most wickets ===
Player	Team	Balls	Wickets	Average	BBI	5w
Heather Booth	Berkshire	283	12	10.41	5/26	1
Hannah Lloyd	Somerset	252	11	10.36	4/19	0
Megan Pearcey	Hampshire	174	10	8.10	5/10	1
Rosalie Birch	Sussex	170	10	8.30	3/7	0
Aimee Watkins	Sussex	196	10	9.20	3/16	0

Source: CricketArchive
