= Elaine Wulcko =

English cricketer (born 1959)

Personal information
- Full name: Elaine Wulcko
- Born: September 1959 (age 67); Hastings, Sussex, England
- Batting: Right-handed
- Bowling: Right-arm medium
- Role: Bowler

International information
- National side: England (1987)
- Test debut (cap 106): 1 August 1987 v Australia
- Last Test: 21 August 1987 v Australia
- Only ODI (cap 48): 25 July 1987 v Australia

Domestic team information
- Years: Team
- 1980–1985: Sussex
- 1986–1994: East Anglia

Career statistics
Competition	WTest	WODI	WFC	WLA
Matches	2	1	11	31
Runs scored	18	0	70	301
Batting average	6.00	–	7.00	15.05
100s/50s	0/0	–	0/0	0/1
Top score	12	–	20*	54
Balls bowled	170	12	1,617	1,400
Wickets	1	0	26	32
Bowling average	94.00	–	18.57	22.84
5 wickets in innings	0	–	0	0
10 wickets in match	0	–	0	0
Best bowling	1/32	0/15	4/35	3/11
Catches/stumpings	0/–	0/–	7/–	10/–
- Source: CricketArchive, 20 February 2021

Elaine Wulcko (born September 1959) was an English women's international cricketer.

She played three international matches for the England women's cricket team. Her Test match debut came in an innings defeat to Australia, a match in which she took her only Test wicket. She went wicketless in her two other appearances; another Test and a One Day International, both against Australia.

She played domestically for Sussex and East Anglia.
