= 2003 Women's County Championship =

- Administrator(s): England and Wales Cricket Board
- Cricket format: 50 over
- Tournament format(s): League system
- Champions: Sussex (1st title)
- Participants: 21
- Most runs: Taryn Keir (303)
- Most wickets: Lynne Spooner (12)

The 2003 Women's County One-Day Championship was the 7th cricket Women's County Championship season. It took place in July and saw 21 county teams compete in a series of divisions. Sussex Women won the County Championship as winners of the top division, achieving their first Championship title.

== Competition format ==
Teams played matches within a series of divisions with the winners of the top division being crowned County Champions. Matches were played using a one day format with 50 overs per side.

The championship works on a points system with positions within the divisions being based on the total points. Points were awarded as follows:

Win: 12 points.
Tie: 6 points.
Loss: Bonus points.
No Result: 11 points.
Abandoned: 11 points.

Up to five batting and five bowling points per side were also available.

== Teams ==
The 2003 Championship consisted of three divisions of six teams apiece, with teams playing each other once. The Emerging Counties competition was also competed in 2003: a tier below the County Championship, consisting of three teams, playing each other once.

Division One	Berkshire	Kent	Nottinghamshire	Surrey	Sussex	Yorkshire
Division Two	Hampshire	Hertfordshire	Lancashire	Middlesex	Somerset	Staffordshire
Division Three	Cheshire	Derbyshire	Durham	Essex	Northamptonshire	Warwickshire
Emerging Counties	Cumbria	Norfolk	Wiltshire			

== County Championship ==
=== Division One ===
Team	Pld	W	L	T	A	Bat	Bowl	Ded	Pts
Sussex (C)	5	4	1	0	0	13.5	25	0	86.5
Nottinghamshire	5	4	1	0	0	17	21	0	86
Kent	5	3	2	0	0	16.5	16	0	68.5
Yorkshire	5	2	3	0	0	16	18.5	0	58.5
Surrey	5	2	3	0	0	16.5	14	0	54.5
Berkshire (R)	5	0	5	0	0	15	17	0	32

Source: ECB Women's County Championship

=== Division Two ===
Team	Pld	W	L	T	A	Bat	Bowl	Ded	Pts
Lancashire (P)	5	4	0	0	1	16.5	17.5	0	93
Middlesex	5	4	1	0	0	14.5	24	0	86.5
Staffordshire	5	3	1	0	1	11.5	16	0	74.5
Somerset	5	2	3	0	0	15	17.5	0	56.5
Hampshire	5	1	4	0	0	13	13	0	38
Hertfordshire (R)	5	0	5	0	0	11.5	8	0	19.5

Source: ECB Women's County Championship

=== Division Three ===
Team	Pld	W	L	T	A	Bat	Bowl	Ded	Pts
Durham (P)	5	3	1	1	0	20.5	20	0	82.5
Derbyshire	5	3	1	1	0	14	24.5	0	80.5
Warwickshire	5	3	1	0	1	13.5	13.5	0	74
Cheshire	5	2	2	1	0	18	18	0	66
Essex	5	0	3	1	1	12	13	0	42
Northamptonshire	5	1	4	0	0	12.5	9	0	33.5

Source: ECB Women's County Championship

== Emerging Counties ==
Team	Pld	W	L	T	A	Bat	Bowl	Ded	Pts
Norfolk	2	2	0	0	0	8	10	0	42
Wiltshire	2	1	1	0	0	7.5	5.5	0	25
Cumbria	2	0	2	0	0	7	3.5	0	10.5

Source: ECB Women's County Championship

== Statistics ==
=== Most runs ===
Player	Team	Matches	Innings	Runs	Average	HS	100s	50s
Taryn Keir	Warwickshire	5	5	303	75.75	109	1	2
Mel Jones	Surrey	5	5	263	52.60	124	1	2
Arran Brindle	Lancashire	5	5	258	64.50	99*	0	2
Charlotte Edwards	Kent	5	5	212	53.00	85*	0	2
Hannah Lloyd	Somerset	5	5	190	47.50	78	0	1

Source: CricketArchive

=== Most wickets ===
Player	Team	Balls	Wickets	Average	BBI	5w
Lynne Spooner	Derbyshire	281	12	10.41	3/14	0
Jill Holling	Derbyshire	238	11	8.09	5/20	1
Katie Berry	Middlesex	299	11	10.81	4/17	0
Susanne White	Lancashire	182	10	6.40	6/16	1
Juliet Tetley	Durham	300	10	6.70	5/19	1

Source: CricketArchive
