= 2012 Women's Twenty20 Cup =

- Administrator: England and Wales Cricket Board
- Cricket format: Twenty20
- Tournament format: League system
- Champions: Sussex (1st title)
- Participants: 36
- Most runs: Heather Knight (284)
- Most wickets: Georgia Elwiss (10)

The 2012 Women's Twenty20 Cup was the 4th cricket Women's Twenty20 Cup tournament. It took place in July and August, with 36 teams taking part: 33 county teams plus Wales, Ireland and the Netherlands. Sussex Women won the Twenty20 Cup, beating Berkshire Women in the final, achieving their first T20 title. The tournament ran alongside the 50-over 2012 Women's County Championship.

== Competition format ==
Teams played matches within a series of regionalised divisions, with the winners of the top divisions progressing to semi-finals and a final. Matches were played using a Twenty20 format.

The divisions worked on a points system with positions within the divisions being based on the total points. Points were awarded as follows:

Win: 2 points.
Tie: 1 points.
Loss: 0 points.
Abandoned/Cancelled: 1 point.

== Teams ==
The 2012 Women's Twenty20 Cup was divided into three regions: Midlands & North, South and South & West. Each region was further divided into divisions: Midlands & North with four, South with three and South & West with two. Teams in each division played each other once, and then the top two played in a Division Final and bottom two in a 3rd-place play-off. The winners of each Division 1, and the best-performing second-place team, progressed to the semi-finals.

=== Midlands & North ===
Division One	Nottinghamshire	Warwickshire	Worcestershire	Yorkshire
Division Two	Lancashire	Gloucestershire	Northamptonshire	Staffordshire
Division Three	Cheshire	Cumbria	Durham	Netherlands
Division Four	Derbyshire	Leicestershire and Rutland	Northumberland	Oxfordshire

=== South ===
Division One	Kent	Middlesex	Surrey	Sussex
Division Two	Essex	Hampshire	Hertfordshire	Suffolk
Division Three	Bedfordshire	Cambridgeshire and Huntingdonshire	Ireland	Norfolk

=== South & West ===
Division One	Berkshire	Devon	Somerset	Wales
Division Two	Buckinghamshire	Cornwall	Dorset	Wiltshire

== Midlands & North ==
=== Division 1 ===
==== Group stage ====
Team	Pld	W	L	T	A	C	NRR	Ded	Pts
Yorkshire (Q)	3	3	0	0	0	0	+0.80	0	6
Nottinghamshire	3	2	1	0	0	0	+0.70	0	4
Worcestershire	3	1	2	0	0	0	−0.91	0	2
Warwickshire (R)	3	0	3	0	0	0	−1.27	0	0

Source: ECB Women's Twenty20 Cup

==== Final ====
31 July 2012
Scorecard

Nottinghamshire; 73/7 (20 overs)	v	Yorkshire; 77/3 (19.1 overs)
Maddy Green 33 (48); Katherine Brunt 2/7 (4 overs)		Danielle Hazell 26 (32); Lucy Maxwell 2/13 (4 overs)

Yorkshire won by 6 wickets
Arlington Avenue, Leamington Spa

- Yorkshire won the toss and elected to field.
- Yorkshire progress to the semi-finals.

==== Third-place play-off ====
31 July 2012
Scorecard

Worcestershire; 123/7 (20 overs)	v	Warwickshire; 114 (19.4 overs)
Laura Crofts 2/14 (2 overs)		Amy Jones 35 (35)

Worcestershire won by 9 runs
Arlington Avenue, Leamington Spa
Umpires: Ian Edwards and David Ludlow

- Warwickshire won the toss and elected to field.
- Warwickshire relegated to Midlands & North Division 2.

=== Division 2 ===
Team	Pld	W	L	T	A	C	NRR	Ded	Pts
Staffordshire (P)	3	3	0	0	0	0	+5.74	0	6
Lancashire	3	1	1	0	0	1	−0.22	0	2
Gloucestershire (R)	3	1	1	0	0	1	−1.45	0	2
Northamptonshire	3	0	3	0	0	0	−3.06	0	0

Source: ECB Women's Twenty20 Cup

==== Final ====
31 July 2012
Scorecard

Lancashire; 79 (16 overs)	v	Staffordshire; 84/3 (13.2 overs)
Natalie Brown 32 (21); Stephanie Butler 4/9 (4 overs)		Francesca James 28 (17); Megan Fairclough 2/22 (4 overs)

Staffordshire won by 7 wickets
The Copper Yard, Denby

- Lancashire won the toss and elected to bat.
- Lancashire promoted to Midlands & North Division 1.

==== Third-place play-off ====
31 July 2012
Scorecard

Gloucestershire; 96/8 (20 overs)	v	Northamptonshire; 94/6 (20 overs)
Emily Ablitt 30 (40); Fi Morris 2/17 (4 overs)		Fi Morris 40 (43); Patricia Hankins 2/8 (4 overs)

Northamptonshire won by 2 runs
The Copper Yard, Denby

- Gloucestershire won the toss and elected to field.
- Gloucestershire relegated to Midlands & North Division 3.

=== Division 3 ===
Team	Pld	W	L	T	A	C	NRR	Ded	Pts
Netherlands (P)	3	3	0	0	0	0	+1.51	0	6
Cheshire	3	2	1	0	0	0	+1.62	0	4
Durham	3	1	2	0	0	0	−1.27	0	2
Cumbria (R)	3	0	3	0	0	0	−1.54	0	0

Source: ECB Women's Twenty20 Cup

==== Final ====
31 July 2012
Scorecard

Cheshire; 94 (19.2 overs)	v	Netherlands; 95/0 (12.5 overs)
Dawn Prestidge 18 (–); Leonie Bennett 2/9 (4 overs)		Helmien Rambaldo 45* (–)

Netherlands won by 10 wickets
Stocksfield Cricket Club Ground, Stocksfield

- Cheshire won the toss and elected to bat.
- Netherlands promoted to Midlands & North Division 2.

==== Third-place play-off ====
31 July 2012
Scorecard

Cumbria; 102/7 (20 overs)	v	Durham; 103/4 (17 overs)
Matisse Iliffe 42* (–)		Sarah Earl 3/25 (4 overs)

Durham won by 6 wickets
Stocksfield Cricket Club Ground, Stocksfield

- Cumbria won the toss and elected to bat.
- Cumbria relegated to Midlands & North Division 4.

=== Division 4 ===
Team	Pld	W	L	T	A	C	NRR	Ded	Pts
Leicestershire (P)	3	2	1	0	0	0	+1.56	0	4
Derbyshire	3	2	1	0	0	0	+0.83	0	4
Oxfordshire	3	2	1	0	0	0	+0.47	0	4
Northumberland	3	0	3	0	0	0	−3.02	0	0

Source: ECB Women's Twenty20 Cup

==== Final ====
31 July 2012
Scorecard

Derbyshire; 55 (14.2 overs)	v	Leicestershire; 56/0 (10.1 overs)
Rebecca Vernon 30 (35); Abigail McCray 3/4 (2.2 overs)		Harriet Leach 27* (25)

Leicestershire won by 10 wickets
Kibworth Cricket Club New Ground, Kibworth

- Leicestershire won the toss and elected to field.
- Leicestershire promoted to Midlands & North Division 3.

==== Third-place play-off ====
31 July 2012
Scorecard

Oxfordshire; 117/6 (20 overs)	v	Northumberland; 95/7 (20 overs)
Gemma Muttitt 34 (40); Nicola Hawes 2/20 (4 overs)		Nicola Hawes 23 (–); Gemma Muttitt 1/9 (2 overs)

Oxfordshire won by 22 runs
Sim Iliffe Ground, Kibworth
Umpires: Phil Barston and David Perry

- Northumberland won the toss and elected to field.

== South ==
=== Division 1 ===
==== Group stage ====
Team	Pld	W	L	T	A	C	NRR	Ded	Pts
Sussex (Q)	3	2	0	0	1	0	+3.03	0	5
Kent (Q)	3	2	0	0	1	0	+2.23	0	5
Middlesex	3	0	2	0	1	0	−1.23	0	1
Surrey (R)	3	0	2	0	1	0	−5.53	0	1

Source: ECB Women's Twenty20 Cup

==== Final ====
31 July 2012
Scorecard

Kent; 124/8 (20 overs)	v	Sussex; 142/4 (20 overs)
Charlotte Edwards 34 (34); Holly Colvin 3/25 (4 overs)		Sarah Taylor 56 (40); Susie Rowe 1/13 (2 overs)

Sussex won by 18 runs
Hunts Hill Road, Normandy
Umpires: Graham Cooper and Matt Johnson

- Kent won the toss and elected to field.
- Sussex and Kent progress to the semi-finals.

==== Third-place play-off ====
31 July 2012
Scorecard

Surrey; 94/5 (20 overs)	v	Middlesex; 90/1 (12.4 overs)
Sarah Clarke 34* (32); Binaisha Shah 3/11 (4 overs)		Natasha Miles 53* (37); Jessica Jackson 1/33 (4 overs)

Middlesex won by 9 wickets (Average Run Rate method)
Lower Ground, Normandy

- Middlesex won the toss and elected to field.
- Middlesex innings reduced to 19 overs due to rain; target was 90.
- Surrey relegated to South Division 2.

=== Division 2 ===
Team	Pld	W	L	T	A	C	NRR	Ded	Pts
Essex (P)	3	3	0	0	0	0	+6.17	0	6
Hertfordshire	3	1	1	0	0	1	−1.11	0	3
Hampshire	3	1	2	0	0	0	+1.26	0	2
Suffolk	3	0	2	0	0	1	−6.30	0	1

Source: ECB Women's Twenty20 Cup

==== Final ====
31 July 2012
Scorecard

Essex; 145/5 (20 overs)	v	Hertfordshire; 46 (14 overs)
Leigh Kasperek 53* (46); Helen Gibson 1/24 (4 overs)		Phoebe McMurray 11 (13); Katie Mack 3/20 (3 overs)

Essex won by 99 runs
Wamil Way, Mildenhall

- Hertfordshire won the toss and elected to field.
- Essex promoted to South Division 1.

==== Third-place play-off ====
31 July 2012
Scorecard

Suffolk; 61/6 (20 overs)	v	Hampshire; 62/1 (11 overs)
Penny Everett 12 (14); Emma Plume 2/5 (2 overs)		Charlotte Taylor 35 (36); Lizzie Shaw 1/6 (2 overs)

Hampshire won by 9 wickets
Wamil Way, Mildenhall
Umpires: Jeff Lewis and Stephen Lilley

- Suffolk won the toss and elected to bat.
- Suffolk relegated to South Division 3.

=== Division 3 ===
Team	Pld	W	L	T	A	C	NRR	Ded	Pts
Ireland (Note: Ireland were not promoted as they did not compete in 2013.)	3	3	0	0	0	0	+7.25	0	6
Cambridgeshire and Huntingdonshire	3	2	1	0	0	0	−0.54	0	4
Norfolk	3	1	2	0	0	0	−2.47	0	2
Bedfordshire	3	0	3	0	0	0	−4.47	0	0

Source: ECB Women's Twenty20 Cup

==== Final ====
31 July 2012
Scorecard

Ireland; 71/0 (7 overs)	v	Cambridgeshire and Huntingdonshire; 25/3 (7 overs)
Clare Shillington 40* (20)		Elizabeth Reynolds 14 (20); Laura Delany 2/2 (1 over)

Ireland won by 46 runs
Lancot Park, Totternhoe
Umpires: Paul Barnes and Ian Stockdale

- Ireland won the toss and elected to bat.
- Match reduced to 7 overs per side due to rain.

==== Third-place play-off ====
31 July 2012
Scorecard

Norfolk; 61/2 (12 overs)	v	Bedfordshire; 45/8 (12 overs)
Peggy Tirimanna 33 (42); Anisha Thind 1/5 (2 overs)		Julie Clarke 15 (17); Amber Tirimanna 3/10 (2 overs)

Norfolk won by 16 runs
Lancot Park, Totternhoe

- Norfolk won the toss and elected to bat.
- Match reduced to 12 overs per side due to rain.

== South & West ==
=== Division 1 ===
==== Group stage ====
Team	Pld	W	L	T	A	C	NRR	Ded	Pts
Berkshire (Q)	3	3	0	0	0	0	+2.56	0	6
Somerset	3	2	1	0	0	0	+1.41	0	4
Wales	3	1	2	0	0	0	−1.04	0	2
Devon (R)	3	0	3	0	0	0	−3.04	0	0

Source: ECB Women's Twenty20 Cup

==== Final ====
31 July 2012
Scorecard

Berkshire	v	Somerset

Match Abandoned
Spytty Park, Newport

- No toss.
- No play was possible due to rain.
- Berkshire progress to the semi-finals.

==== Third-place play-off ====
31 July 2012
Scorecard

Wales	v	Devon

Match Abandoned
Spytty Park, Newport

- No toss.
- No play was possible due to rain.
- Devon relegated to South & West Division 2.

=== Division 2 ===
Team	Pld	W	L	T	A	C	NRR	Ded	Pts
Buckinghamshire	3	3	0	0	0	0	+1.72	0	6
Cornwall (P)	3	2	1	0	0	0	+1.02	0	4
Wiltshire	3	1	2	0	0	0	−1.02	0	2
Dorset	3	0	3	0	0	0	–1.77	0	0

Source: ECB Women's Twenty20 Cup

==== Final ====
31 July 2012
Scorecard

Buckinghamshire; 59 (20 overs)	v	Cornwall; 60/5 (18.1 overs)
Sue Benson 19 (38); Katie Pearce 3/7 (4 overs)		Hannah Grice 15 (29); Laura Sandy 2/3 (4 overs)

Cornwall won by 5 wickets
Dauntsey's School Ground, West Lavington

- Buckinghamshire won the toss and elected to bat.
- Cornwall promoted to South & West Division 1.

==== Third-place play-off ====
31 July 2012
Scorecard

Dorset; 76/6 (20 overs)	v	Wiltshire; 77/0 (14.1 overs)
Danielle Rigby 22 (35); Hannah Morgan 2/10 (4 overs)		Hannah Morgan 34* (44)

Wiltshire won by 10 wickets
Dauntsey's School Ground, West Lavington

- Dorset won the toss and elected to bat.

== Knock-Out Stage ==
=== Semi-finals ===
27 August 2012
Scorecard

Berkshire; 117/9 (20 overs)	v	Kent; 113/9 (20 overs)
Asha Smith 47 (29); Charlotte Edwards 3/29 (4 overs)		Charlotte Edwards 37 (−); Heather Knight 3/19 (4 overs)

Berkshire won by 4 runs
Sadler's End, Sindlesham, Wokingham
Umpires: John Golding and Alison Smith

- Kent won the toss and elected to field.
- Berkshire progress to the final.

27 August 2012
Scorecard

Sussex; 130/6 (20 overs)	v	Yorkshire; 113/8 (20 overs)
Sarah Taylor 58 (47); Camilla Westwood 2/24 (4 overs)		Lauren Winfield 33 (38); Georgia Elwiss 3/9 (4 overs)

Sussex won by 17 runs
Sadler's End, Sindlesham, Wokingham
Umpires: Peter Brown and Les Clemenson

- Yorkshire won the toss and elected to field.
- Sussex progress to the final.

=== Third-place play-off ===
27 August 2012
Scorecard

Kent; 133/7 (20 overs)	v	Yorkshire; 126/7 (20 overs)
Susie Rowe 67 (59); Katherine Brunt 2/21 (4 overs)		Liz Perry 45* (29); Rhiannon Dick 2/15 (4 overs)

Kent won by 7 runs
Sadler's End, Sindlesham, Wokingham

- Yorkshire won the toss and elected to field.

=== Final ===
27 August 2012
Scorecard

Berkshire; 52 (18.3 overs)	v	Sussex; 54/0 (18.2 overs)
Linsey Smith 12 (28); Izi Noakes 3/5 (4 overs)		Alexia Walker 39* (18)

Sussex won by 10 wickets
Sadler's End, Sindlesham, Wokingham
Umpires: John Golding and Alison Smith

- Sussex won the toss and elected to field.
- Sussex won the 2012 Women's Twenty20 Cup.

== Statistics ==
=== Most runs ===
Player	Team	Matches	Innings	Runs	Average	HS	100s	50s
Heather Knight	Berkshire	5	5	284	94.66	111	2	1
Jenny Dunn	Cheshire	4	4	247	82.33	93	0	3
Elyse Villani	Staffordshire	4	4	226	113.00	98*	0	3
Fran Wilson	Somerset	3	3	168	84.00	79	0	1
Katie Mack	Essex	3	3	162	162.00	71*	0	2

Source: CricketArchive

=== Most wickets ===
Player	Team	Balls	Wickets	Average	BBI	5w
Georgia Elwiss	Sussex	114	10	5.80	3/9	0
Alexia Walker	Sussex	102	9	8.44	4/12	0
Lucy Maxwell	Nottinghamshire	72	8	5.00	5/9	1
Judith Turner	Buckinghamshire	96	8	6.12	4/8	0
Izi Noakes	Sussex	108	8	6.62	3/5	0

Source: CricketArchive
