= 2019 Women's Twenty20 Cup =

- Administrator(s): England and Wales Cricket Board
- Cricket format: Twenty20
- Tournament format(s): League system
- Champions: Warwickshire (1st title)
- Participants: 35
- Most runs: Sophie Luff (316)
- Most wickets: Laura Ellison (15)

The 2019 Women's Twenty20 Cup, known for sponsorship reasons as the 2019 Vitality Women's Twenty20 Cup was the 11th cricket Women's Twenty20 Cup tournament. It took place in June, with 35 teams taking part: 33 county teams plus Scotland and Wales. Warwickshire Women won the Twenty20 Cup, as winners of Division 1, therefore achieving their first title.

The tournament followed the 50-over 2019 Women's County Championship, and was subsequently followed by the Twenty20 2019 Women's Cricket Super League, competed for by regional teams.

== Competition format ==
Teams played matches within a series of divisions with the winners of the top division being crowned the Champions. Matches were played using a Twenty20 format.

The championship works on a points system with positions within the divisions being based on the total points. Points were awarded as follows:

Win: 4 points.
Tie: 2 points.
Loss: 0 points.
Abandoned/Cancelled: 1 point.

== Teams ==
The 2019 Women's Twenty20 Cup was divided into three divisions: Division One and Division Two with nine teams each, and Division Three with 17 teams, divided into regional groups. Teams in Divisions One and Two played each other once, and teams in Division Three played each other either once or twice.

Division One	Hampshire	Kent	Lancashire	Middlesex	Nottinghamshire	Surrey	Sussex	Wales	Warwickshire
Division Two	Cheshire	Derbyshire	Devon	Durham	Essex	Scotland A	Somerset	Worcestershire	Yorkshire
Division Three - Group A	Berkshire	Cornwall	Dorset	Gloucestershire	Oxfordshire	Wiltshire			
Division Three - Group B	Buckinghamshire	Cambridgeshire	Hertfordshire	Lincolnshire	Norfolk	Northamptonshire	Suffolk		
Division Three - Group C	Cumbria	Leicestershire and Rutland	Shropshire	Staffordshire					

== Division One ==
Team	Pld	W	L	T	A	C	NRR	Ded	Pts
Warwickshire (C)	8	5	3	0	0	0	–0.26	0	20
Lancashire	8	4	1	0	2	1	+0.77	0	19
Kent	8	4	2	0	2	0	+0.04	0	18
Hampshire	8	4	3	0	0	1	–0.19	0	17
Surrey	8	4	3	0	1	0	+0.95	0	17
Sussex	8	3	4	0	1	0	+0.30	0	13
Wales	8	2	4	0	0	2	–0.32	0	10
Middlesex	8	2	4	0	1	1	–0.61	0	10
Nottinghamshire	8	1	5	0	1	1	–0.78	0	6

Source: ECB Women's Twenty20 Cup

== Division Two ==
Team	Pld	W	L	T	A	C	NRR	Ded	Pts
Somerset	8	6	2	0	0	0	–0.03	0	24
Durham	8	5	3	0	0	0	+0.54	0	20
Scotland A	8	4	2	0	2	0	+0.70	0	18
Yorkshire	8	4	2	0	0	2	+1.34	0	18
Essex	8	4	2	0	0	2	–0.07	0	18
Worcestershire	8	3	3	0	0	2	+0.27	0	14
Devon	8	3	3	0	0	2	–0.36	0	14
Cheshire	8	1	7	0	0	0	–1.26	0	4
Derbyshire	8	0	6	0	0	2	–1.42	0	2

Source: ECB Women's Twenty20 Cup

== Division Three ==
=== Group A ===
Team	Pld	W	L	T	A	C	NRR	Ded	Pts
Berkshire	8	7	1	0	0	0	+2.47	0	28
Oxfordshire	8	6	2	0	0	0	+0.05	0	24
Cornwall	8	4	4	0	0	0	+0.40	0	16
Gloucestershire	8	3	3	0	0	2	+0.41	0	14
Dorset	8	1	5	0	0	2	–3.08	0	6
Wiltshire	8	0	6	0	0	2	–1.48	0	2

Source: ECB Women's Twenty20 Cup

=== Group B ===
Team	Pld	W	L	T	A	C	NRR	Ded	Pts
Northamptonshire	8	8	0	0	0	0	+2.20	0	32
Buckinghamshire	8	5	3	0	0	0	+0.17	0	20
Hertfordshire	8	4	4	0	0	0	+0.22	0	16
Norfolk	8	3	5	0	0	0	–0.68	0	12
Lincolnshire	8	3	5	0	0	0	–0.98	0	12
Cambridgeshire	8	3	5	0	0	0	–0.44	0	12
Suffolk	8	2	6	0	0	0	–0.46	0	8

Source: ECB Women's Twenty20 Cup

=== Group C ===
Team	Pld	W	L	T	A	C	NRR	Ded	Pts
Staffordshire	8	6	0	0	0	2	+2.45	0	26
Cumbria	8	3	3	0	0	2	–0.13	0	14
Leicestershire and Rutland	8	2	3	1	0	2	–0.11	0	12
Shropshire	8	0	5	1	0	2	–2.07	0	4

Source: ECB Women's Twenty20 Cup

== Statistics ==
=== Most runs ===
Player	Team	Matches	Innings	Runs	Average	HS	100s	50s
Sophie Luff	Somerset	8	8	316	52.66	52	0	1
Sarah Bryce	Scotland	6	6	272	90.66	101*	1	1
Marie Kelly	Warwickshire	8	8	218	36.33	76	0	2
Hayley Brown	Northamptonshire	8	8	213	35.50	35	0	0
Bryony Smith	Surrey	6	5	211	52.75	85	0	2

Source: CricketArchive

=== Most wickets ===
Player	Team	Balls	Wickets	Average	BBI	5w
Laura Ellison	Durham	186	15	8.66	3/12	0
Flora Bertwistle	Worcestershire	130	14	5.00	4/18	0
Patricia Hankins	Northamptonshire	172	14	6.57	5/13	1
Isabella Fitzgibbon	Buckinghamshire	186	13	8.61	4/4	0
Chloe Sainsbury	Cambridgeshire	120	12	7.91	4/10	0

Source: CricketArchive
