= 2011 Women's Twenty20 Cup =

- Administrator(s): England and Wales Cricket Board
- Cricket format: Twenty20
- Tournament format(s): League system
- Champions: Kent (1st title)
- Participants: 35
- Most runs: Danni Wyatt (202)
- Most wickets: Alice Davidson-Richards (12)

The 2011 Women's Twenty20 Cup was the 3rd cricket Women's Twenty20 Cup tournament. It took place in August and September, with 35 teams taking part: 33 county teams plus Wales and the Netherlands. Kent Women won the Twenty20 Cup, beating Berkshire Women in the final, achieving their first T20 title. The tournament ran alongside the 50-over 2011 Women's County Championship.

== Competition format ==
Teams played matches within a series of regionalised divisions, with the winners of the top divisions progressing to semi-finals and a final. Matches were played using a Twenty20 format.

The divisions worked on a points system with positions within the divisions being based on the total points. Points were awarded as follows:

Win: 2 points.
Tie: 1 points.
Loss: 0 points.
Abandoned/Cancelled: 1 point.

== Teams ==
The 2011 Women's Twenty20 Cup was divided into three regions: Midlands & North, South and South & West. Each region was further divided into divisions: Midlands & North with four, South with three and South & West with two. Teams in each division played each other once, and then the top two played in a Division Final and bottom two in a third-place play-off. The winners of each Division 1, and the best-performing second-place team, progressed to the semi-finals.

=== Midlands & North ===
Division One	Nottinghamshire	Staffordshire	Warwickshire	Yorkshire
Division Two	Cheshire	Lancashire	Northamptonshire	Worcestershire
Division Three	Cumbria	Durham	Gloucestershire	Northumberland
Division Four	Derbyshire	Leicestershire and Rutland	Netherlands	Oxfordshire

=== South ===
Division One	Essex	Kent	Middlesex	Sussex
Division Two	Cambridgeshire and Huntingdonshire	Hampshire	Hertfordshire	Surrey
Division Three	Bedfordshire	Norfolk	Suffolk	

=== South & West ===
Division One	Berkshire	Devon	Somerset	Wales
Division Two	Buckinghamshire	Cornwall	Dorset	Wiltshire

== Midlands & North ==
=== Division 1 ===
==== Group stage ====
Team	Pld	W	L	T	A	C	NRR	Ded	Pts
Yorkshire (Q)	3	3	0	0	0	0	+2.30	0	6
Warwickshire	3	2	1	0	0	0	+1.80	0	4
Staffordshire (R)	3	1	2	0	0	0	−2.75	0	2
Nottinghamshire	3	0	3	0	0	0	−2.09	0	0

Source: ECB Women's Twenty20 Cup

==== Final ====
3 August 2011
Scorecard

Warwickshire; 102/8 (20 overs)	v	Yorkshire; 105/4 (18.2 overs)
Amy Jones 16 (17); Katherine Brunt 3/15 (4 overs)		Katherine Brunt 49 (34); Rebecca Grundy 1/12 (4 overs)

Yorkshire won by 6 wickets
Arlington Avenue, Leamington Spa
Umpires: Ian Harris and Saeed Rehman

- Yorkshire won the toss and elected to field.
- Yorkshire progress to the semi-finals.

==== Third-place play-off ====
3 August 2011
Scorecard

Nottinghamshire; 133/4 (20 overs)	v	Staffordshire; 109 (19.2 overs)
Jane Smit 43* (34); Elsa-Marie Evans 1/17 (4 overs)		Danni Wyatt 67 (51); Sonia Odedra 3/23 (4 overs)

Nottinghamshire won by 24 runs
Arlington Avenue, Leamington Spa
Umpires: Martin Bancroft and Chris Moore

- Nottinghamshire won the toss and elected to bat.
- Staffordshire relegated to Midlands & North Division 2.

=== Division 2 ===
Team	Pld	W	L	T	A	C	NRR	Ded	Pts
Northamptonshire	3	3	0	0	0	0	+1.84	0	6
Worcestershire (P)	3	2	1	0	0	0	−0.46	0	4
Lancashire	3	1	2	0	0	0	−1.16	0	2
Cheshire (R)	3	0	3	0	0	0	−0.25	0	0

Source: ECB Women's Twenty20 Cup

==== Final ====
3 August 2011
Scorecard

Worcestershire; 109/5 (16 overs)	v	Northamptonshire; 64 (14.2 overs)
Jessica de Tarczyinski 35 (46); Jo Gardner 2/10 (2 overs)		Patricia Hankins 20 (17); Katie Blunt 3/7 (3 overs)

Worcestershire won by 45 runs
Kibworth Cricket Club New Ground, Kibworth
Umpires: Bryan Jones and Paul Pollard

- Northamptonshire won the toss and elected to field.
- Match reduced to 16 overs per side due to rain.
- Worcestershire promoted to Midlands & North Division 1.

==== Third-place play-off ====
3 August 2011
Scorecard

Cheshire; 87/7 (19 overs)	v	Lancashire; 88/4 (17.3 overs)
Hayley Agnew 44* (54); Kate Cross 2/13 (3 overs)		Jessica Scothern 36 (48); Kate Coppack 2/20 (4 overs)

Lancashire won by 6 wickets
Sim Iliffe Ground, Kibworth
Umpires: John Hayes and Raymond Medland

- Cheshire won the toss and elected to bat.
- Match reduced to 19 overs per side due to rain.
- Cheshire relegated to Midlands & North Division 3.

=== Division 3 ===
Team	Pld	W	L	T	A	C	NRR	Ded	Pts
Gloucestershire (P)	3	3	0	0	0	0	+2.52	0	6
Durham	3	2	1	0	0	0	+1.00	0	4
Northumberland (R)	3	1	2	0	0	0	−1.22	0	2
Cumbria	3	0	3	0	0	0	−1.91	0	0

Source: ECB Women's Twenty20 Cup

==== Final ====
3 August 2011
Scorecard

Gloucestershire; 136/5 (20 overs)	v	Durham; 90/7 (20 overs)
Alex MacDonald 59 (50); Hayley Falla 1/13 (3 overs)		Lucy Pringle 26 (14); Fi Morris 3/12 (4 overs)

Gloucestershire won by 46 runs
Stocksfield Cricket Club Ground, Stocksfield

- Gloucestershire promoted to Midlands & North Division 2.

==== Third-place play-off ====
3 August 2011
Scorecard

Northumberland; 92 (19.2 overs)	v	Cumbria; 96/5 (20 overs)
Rachel Mayne 19 (–); Sarah Earl 4/22 (4 overs)		Laura Marshall 42 (–); Kelly Withycombe 3/12 (3 overs)

Cumbria won by 6 wickets
Stocksfield Cricket Club Ground, Stocksfield

- Northumberland won the toss and elected to bat.
- Northumberland relegated to Midlands & North Division 3.

=== Division 4 ===
Team	Pld	W	L	T	A	C	NRR	Ded	Pts
Netherlands (P)	3	3	0	0	0	0	+3.40	0	6
Leicestershire	3	2	1	0	0	0	+1.07	0	4
Derbyshire	3	1	2	0	0	0	+0.48	0	2
Oxfordshire	3	0	3	0	0	0	−5.30	0	0

Source: ECB Women's Twenty20 Cup

==== Final ====
The division final between Netherlands and Leicestershire was scheduled to take place on 3 August 2011 at The Copper Yard, Denby. However, the result of the match is not recorded.

==== Third-place play-off ====
The division third-place play-off between Derbyshire and Oxfordshire was scheduled to take place on 3 August 2011 at The Copper Yard, Denby. However, the result of the match is not recorded.

== South ==
=== Division 1 ===
==== Group stage ====
Team	Pld	W	L	T	A	C	NRR	Ded	Pts
Kent (Q)	3	3	0	0	0	0	+2.17	0	6
Sussex (Q)	3	2	1	0	0	0	+0.70	0	4
Middlesex	3	1	2	0	0	0	−1.52	0	2
Essex (R)	3	0	3	0	0	0	−1.38	0	0

Source: ECB Women's Twenty20 Cup

==== Final ====
3 August 2011
Scorecard

Kent; 131/9 (20 overs)	v	Sussex; 132/8 (19.3 overs)
Susie Rowe 57* (50); Izi Noakes 3/23 (4 overs)		Holly Colvin 26* (16); Charlotte Edwards 2/26 (4 overs)

Sussex won by 2 wickets
Hunts Hill Road, Normandy
Umpires: Graham Bullock and Roger Croft

- Sussex won the toss and elected to field.
- Sussex and Kent progress to the semi-finals.

==== Third-place play-off ====
3 August 2011
Scorecard

Essex; 95 (17.3 overs)	v	Middlesex; 97/0 (12.3 overs)
Elizabeth Wild 20 (24); Sarah Bartlett 3/1 (1.3 overs)		Jenny Halstead 65* (40)

Middlesex won by 10 wickets
Hunts Hill Road, Normandy
Umpires: Roy Goldsmith and Pierre Tertari

- Middlesex won the toss and elected to field.
- Essex relegated to South Division 2.

=== Division 2 ===
Team	Pld	W	L	T	A	C	NRR	Ded	Pts
Surrey (P)	3	3	0	0	0	0	+2.44	0	6
Hampshire	3	2	1	0	0	0	– (Note: NRR unknown due to unrecorded matches)	0	4
Hertfordshire	3	1	2	0	0	0	– (Note: NRR unknown due to unrecorded matches)	0	2
Cambridgeshire and Huntingdonshire (R)	3	0	3	0	0	0	−2.50	0	0

Source: ECB Women's Twenty20 Cup

==== Final ====
3 August 2011
Scorecard

Surrey; 170/3 (20 overs)	v	Hampshire; 48/8 (20 overs)
Ebony Rainford-Brent 80* (51); Rebecca Hartnett 2/39 (4 overs)		Elissa Penketh 12 (27); Sarah Clarke 3/6 (4 overs)

Surrey won by 122 runs
Denis Compton Oval, Shenley
Umpires: Roger Abraham and R Hinstridge

- Hampshire won the toss and elected to field.
- Surrey promoted to South Division 1.

==== Third-place play-off ====
3 August 2011
Scorecard

Hertfordshire; 146/4 (20 overs)	v	Cambridgeshire and Huntingdonshire; 58 (15.2 overs)
Hannah Smith 41 (33); Sarah Hartley 1/12 (2 overs)		Lily Reynolds 16 (17); Hannah Swan 5/6 (3.2 overs)

Hertfordshire won by 88 runs
Nursery Ground, Shenley
Umpires: Murray Carlson and Norman Freeman

- Hertfordshire won the toss and elected to bat.
- Cambridgeshire and Huntingdonshire relegated to South Division 3.

=== Division 3 ===
Team	Pld	W	L	T	A	C	NRR	Ded	Pts
Suffolk (P)	2	1	1	0	0	0	+1.06	0	2
Bedfordshire	2	1	1	0	0	0	−0.39	0	2
Norfolk	2	1	1	0	0	0	−0.74	0	2

Source: ECB Women's Twenty20 Cup

==== Final ====
3 August 2011
Scorecard

Suffolk; 127/2 (20 overs)	v	Bedfordshire; 74/7 (20 overs)
Emma Elsom 53* (55); Amie Nichols 1/22 (4 overs)		Anisha Thind 18* (25); Felicity Cleverley 2/13 (4 overs)

Suffolk won by 53 runs
Wamil Way, Mildenhall
Umpires: Karen Absolon and K Charter

- Suffolk won the toss and elected to bat.
- Suffolk promoted to South Division 2.

== South & West ==
=== Division 1 ===
==== Group stage ====
Team	Pld	W	L	T	A	C	NRR	Ded	Pts
Berkshire (Q)	3	3	0	0	0	0	+2.16	0	6
Devon	3	2	1	0	0	0	+0.08	0	4
Somerset	3	1	2	0	0	0	+0.33	0	2
Wales	3	0	3	0	0	0	−2.73	0	0

Source: ECB Women's Twenty20 Cup

==== Final ====
3 August 2011
Scorecard

Berkshire; 143/4 (20 overs)	v	Devon; 86/7 (20 overs)
Alice Macleod 53 (51); Lydia Harris 1/18 (4 overs)		Amara Carr 27 (40); Nicole Beesley 4/12 (4 overs)

Berkshire won by 57 runs
Spytty Park, Newport
Umpires: J Dey and Dave Jones

- Berkshire won the toss and elected to bat.
- Berkshire progress to the semi-finals.

==== Third-place play-off ====
3 August 2011
Scorecard

Somerset; 166/3 (20 overs)	v	Wales; 169/3 (19.5 overs)
Fran Wilson 92 (60); Gwenan Davies 1/13 (3 overs)		Bethan Moorcraft 68 (–); Jackie Hawker 2/36 (3.5 overs)

Wales won by 7 wickets
Spytty Park, Newport
Umpires: Clive Reynolds and Bob Szpadt

- Wales won the toss and elected to field.

=== Division 2 ===
Team	Pld	W	L	T	A	C	NRR	Ded	Pts
Buckinghamshire	3	2	1	0	0	0	+2.98	0	4
Wiltshire	3	2	1	0	0	0	+0.35	0	4
Cornwall	3	2	1	0	0	0	−1.45	0	4
Dorset	3	0	3	0	0	0	–1.91	0	0

Source: ECB Women's Twenty20 Cup

==== Final ====
3 August 2011
Scorecard

Buckinghamshire; 88/7 (20 overs)	v	Wiltshire; 89/5 (19 overs)
Charlotte Voden 18* (29); Emily Wakeling 2/18 (4 overs)		Catherine Amore 37* (47); Lorna Browne 2/16 (4 overs)

Wiltshire won by 5 wickets
Wellington College, Crowthorne
Umpires: Eddie Lunn and Alison Smith

- Wiltshire won the toss and elected to field.

==== Third-place play-off ====
3 August 2011
Scorecard

Dorset; 61/9 (14 overs)	v	Cornwall; 64/1 (9.3 overs)
Emily Broad 16 (–); Jade Williams 3/8 (4 overs)		Charlotte Phillips 32* (–); Lauren Willows 1/11 (2 overs)

Cornwall won by 9 wickets
Wellington College, Crowthorne

- Dorset won the toss and elected to bat.
- Match reduced to 14 overs per side due to rain.

== Knock-Out Stage ==
=== Semi-finals ===
17 September 2011
Scorecard

Berkshire; 144/6 (20 overs)	v	Yorkshire; 134/7 (20 overs)
Heather Knight 66 (63); Katie Levick 2/24 (4 overs)		Danielle Hazell 58 (42); Daisy Gardner 2/22 (4 overs)

Berkshire won by 10 runs
Nursery Ground, Shenley
Umpires: Lorraine Elgar and Angela Tuff

- Berkshire won the toss and elected to bat.
- Berkshire progress to the final.

17 September 2011
Scorecard

Kent; 103/5 (19.3 overs)	v	Sussex; 101/9 (20 overs)
Laura Marsh 55* (67); Sophie Parnell 1/14 (2 overs)		Sarah Taylor 37 (44); Alice Davidson-Richards 4/13 (4 overs)

Kent won by 5 wickets
Denis Compton Oval, Shenley
Umpires: Janet Rogers and Alison Smith

- Kent won the toss and elected to field.
- Kent progress to the final.

=== Third-place play-off ===
17 September 2011
Scorecard

Sussex; 130/3 (13.2 overs)	v	Yorkshire; 126/6 (20 overs)
Arran Brindle 45 (35); Laura Spragg 1/21 (3 overs)		Salliann Briggs 35 (44); Chiara Green 2/15 (3 overs)

Sussex won by 7 wickets
Nursery Ground, Shenley
Umpires: Alison Smith and Angela Tuff

- Sussex won the toss and elected to field.

=== Final ===
17 September 2011
Scorecard

Berkshire; 73 (19.1 overs)	v	Kent; 74/2 (11 overs)
Isa Guha 18 (14); Charlotte Edwards 2/9 (4 overs)		Tammy Beaumont 26* (19); Isa Guha 2/15 (3 overs)

Kent won by 8 wickets
Denis Compton Oval, Shenley
Umpires: Lorraine Elgar and Janet Rogers

- Berkshire won the toss and elected to bat.
- Kent won the 2011 Women's Twenty20 Cup.

== Statistics ==
=== Most runs ===
Player	Team	Matches	Innings	Runs	Average	HS	100s	50s
Danni Wyatt	Staffordshire	4	4	202	67.33	91*	0	2
Jenny Dunn	Middlesex	4	4	193	64.33	70	0	2
Heather Knight	Berkshire	6	5	171	42.75	66	0	1
Laura Marsh	Kent	6	6	167	33.40	64	0	2
Katherine Brunt	Yorkshire	6	6	162	27.00	49	0	0

Source: CricketArchive

=== Most wickets ===
Player	Team	Balls	Wickets	Average	BBI	5w
Alice Davidson-Richards	Kent	126	12	10.25	4/13	0
Charlotte Edwards	Kent	108	10	9.40	3/22	0
Katie Levick	Yorkshire	134	10	10.50	5/16	1
Delissa Kimmince	Warwickshire	96	9	7.44	3/12	0
Georgia Elwiss	Sussex	111	9	13.00	3/29	0

Source: CricketArchive
