= Leicestershire Women cricket team =

English county cricket team

Leicestershire Women
- One Day name: Leicestershire Foxes

Personnel
- Captain: Rebecca Brooker
- Coach: Stephen Franklin

Team information
- Founded: Unknown First recorded match: 1948
- Home ground: Grace Road, Leicester

History
- WCC wins: 0
- T20 Cup wins: 0
- Official website: Leicestershire Cricket
One-day
T20

The Leicestershire Women's cricket team, officially the Leicestershire and Rutland Women's cricket team since 2010, is the women's representative cricket team for the English historic counties of Leicestershire and Rutland. They play their home games often at Grace Road, Leicester. They are captained by Rebecca Brooker. They currently play as a Tier 2 side in the Women's One-Day Cup, the Women's T20 County Cup and the Women's T20 Blast.

== History ==
Leicestershire Women played their first recorded match in 1948, against Buckinghamshire Women. They also played a match against a touring Australia side in 1951, as a combined team with Buckinghamshire. Leicestershire joined the national women's cricket structure in 2004, competing in the County Challenge Cup, the lower tier of the Women's County Championship: they finished bottom of their group in their first season. After this, Leicestershire remained in the lower levels of the Championship. They won their Division 5 group two years in a row, in 2010 and 2011, and after this have mainly played in Division Three. They did gain promotion from Division Three in 2015, coming second, but were relegated the following season.

In the Women's Twenty20 Cup, Leicestershire have had some successful seasons in the lower divisions of the competition: for example, they went unbeaten in 2015 and 2016. Between 2017 and 2019, they played in Division Three. In 2021, they competed in the East Midlands Group of the Twenty20 Cup, finishing 5th with 2 victories. In 2022 they finished third in Group 5 of the Twenty20 Cup, before beating Oxfordshire and Northamptonshire on Finals Day to win their group. They also joined the East of England Women's County Championship in 2022, finishing third out of seven in their first season. In 2023, all of their group stage matches were rained-off in the Twenty20 Cup, but they lost in the semi-final on the group Finals Day. They won the East of England Women's County Championship that season, going unbeaten to top the table. In 2024, the side finished 4th in their group in the Twenty20 Cup and won their group in the new ECB Women's County One-Day tournament, winning all four of their matches.

== Players ==
=== Current squad ===
- No. denotes the player's squad number, as worn on the back of their shirt.

No.	Name	Nationality	Birth date	Notes
Batters
12	Rebecca Brooker	England	20 August 1999 (age 27)	Club captain
18	Prisha Thanawala	England	16 November 2006 (age 19)	Dual registered with The Blaze
30	Flora Davies	England	21 December 2007 (age 18)	Dual registered with The Blaze
33	Indira Singh	England	1 October 2008 (age 18)	Dual registered with Warwickshire
97	Faith Teekasingh	England	27 February 2009 (age 17)	Dual registered with The Blaze
All-rounders
4	Hayley Brown	England	25 March 1998 (age 28)	
15	Francesca Sweet	England	15 June 2004 (age 22)	Dual registered with Hampshire
31	Holly Whitfield	England	17 December 2005 (age 20)	
52	Sophie Grayson	England	14 April 2004 (age 22)	
68	Emelia Butler	England	3 July 2007 (age 19)	
70	Nayma Sheikh	Scotland	4 March 2006 (age 20)	
73	Lucy Weston	England	7 October 2004 (age 22)	
77	Isla-Rose Williamson	England	7 February 2008 (age 18)	Dual registered with The Blaze
84	Ellie Phillips	England	5 November 2006 (age 20)	Dual registered with The Blaze
Wicket-keepers
37	Lucy Western	England	27 November 1998 (age 27)	
44	Ellen Watson	Scotland	10 March 2000 (age 26)	
Bowlers
3	Anjali Ketan	England	28 February 2006 (age 20)	
10	Emma Wrightson	England	9 February 2005 (age 21)	
13	Aimee Colquhoun	England	13 February 2004 (age 22)	
17	Emma Thatcher	England	26 July 1998 (age 28)	
24	April Herathge	England	20 April 2001 (age 25)	
25	Tia Joseph	England	2 November 2005 (age 21)	
66	D'Nica Roff	England	14 June 2006 (age 20)	
72	Caitlin Chissell	England	17 August 2006 (age 20)	

=== Notable players ===
Players who have played for Leicestershire and played internationally are listed below, in order of first international appearance (given in brackets):

- (England) Sonia Odedra (2014)
- (United States) Ella Claridge (2024)

== Seasons ==
=== Women's County Championship ===
Season	Division	League standings								Notes
Season	Division	P	W	L	T	A/C	BP	Pts	Pos	Notes
2004	County Challenge Cup G1	2	0	2	0	0	6.5	6.5	4th	
2005	County Challenge Cup G2	3	1	2	0	0	14	26	4th	
2006	County Challenge Cup G2	3	1	2	0	0	10	30	4th	
2007	County Challenge Cup G3	3	2	0	0	1	0	60	2nd	
2008	Division 5M	3	0	2	1	0	6	22	3rd	
2009	Division 5 N&E	–	–	–	–	–	–	–	–	Withdrew from competition
2010	Division 5N	7	6	1	0	0	50	110	1st	
2011	Division 5E	5	5	0	0	0	37	87	1st	Promoted
2012	Division 3	8	2	0	0	6	14	34	3rd	
2013	Division 3	8	5	3	0	0	53	103	4th	
2014	Division 3	8	5	3	0	0	47	97	5th	
2015	Division 3	8	5	3	0	0	51	101	2nd	Promoted
2016	Division 2	7	1	4	0	2	24	34	7th	Relegated
2017	Division 3D	4	2	1	0	1	21	41	2nd	
2018	Division 3E	6	3	2	0	1	26	56	3rd	
2019	Division 3A	6	4	2	0	0	42	82	3rd	

=== Women's Twenty20 Cup ===
Season	Division	League standings								Notes
Season	Division	P	W	L	T	A/C	NRR	Pts	Pos	Notes
2010	Division M&N 4	2	1	1	0	0	+1.32	2	2nd	Lost promotion play-off
2011	Division M&N 4	3	2	1	0	0	+1.07	4	2nd	Lost promotion play-off
2012	Division M&N 4	3	2	1	0	0	+1.56	4	1st	Promoted
2013	Division M&N 3	2	1	0	0	1	+2.22	3	1st	
2014	Division 3C	4	0	4	0	0	−0.78	0	8th	Relegated
2015	Division 4A	4	4	0	0	0	+3.16	16	1st	Lost promotion play-off
2016	Division 4C	6	6	0	0	0	+1.82	24	1st	
2017	Division 3B	8	5	2	0	1	+0.77	21	2nd	
2018	Division 3B	8	5	3	0	0	+0.13	20	3rd	
2019	Division 3C	8	0	5	1	2	−2.07	4	4th	
2021	East Midlands	8	2	4	0	2	−0.72	10	5th	
2022	Group 5	6	2	4	0	0	−1.24	8	3rd	Group winners
2023	Group 2	6	0	0	0	6	+0.00	6	1st	
2024	Group 2	8	3	2	1	2	–0.49	72	4th	

=== ECB Women's County One-Day ===
Season	Group	League standings								Notes
Season	Group	P	W	L	T	A/C	BP	Pts	Pos	Notes
2024	Group 2	4	4	0	0	0	4	20	1st	Group winners

== Honours ==
- Women's Twenty20 Cup:
  - Group winners (1) – 2022
- ECB Women's County One-Day:
  - Group winners (1) – 2024

== See also ==
- Leicestershire County Cricket Club
- The Blaze (women's cricket)
