= 2018 Women's Twenty20 Cup =

- Administrator(s): England and Wales Cricket Board
- Cricket format: Twenty20
- Tournament format(s): League system
- Champions: Middlesex (1st title)
- Participants: 36
- Most runs: Kezia Hassall (311)
- Most wickets: Providence Cowdrill (15); Rebecca Silk (15)

The 2018 Women's Twenty20 Cup, known for sponsorship reasons as the 2018 Vitality Women's Twenty20 Cup was the 10th cricket Women's Twenty20 Cup tournament. It took place in June and July, with 36 teams taking part: 34 county teams plus Scotland and Wales. Middlesex Women won the Twenty20 Cup, as winners of Division 1, therefore achieving their first title.

The tournament followed the 50-over 2018 Women's County Championship, and was subsequently followed by the Twenty20 2018 Women's Cricket Super League, competed for by regional teams.

== Competition format ==
Teams played matches within a series of divisions with the winners of the top division being crowned the Champions. Matches were played using a Twenty20 format.

The championship works on a points system with positions within the divisions being based on the total points. Points were awarded as follows:

Win: 4 points.
Tie: 1 point.
Loss: 0 points.
Abandoned/Cancelled: 1 point.

== Teams ==
The 2018 Women's Twenty20 Cup was divided into three divisions: Division One and Division Two with nine teams each, and Division Three with 18 teams, divided into regional groups of 6 teams apiece; teams in all divisions played eight games.

Division One	Kent	Lancashire	Middlesex	Nottinghamshire	Surrey	Sussex	Warwickshire	Worcestershire	Yorkshire
Division Two	Berkshire	Cheshire	Durham	Gloucestershire	Hampshire	Northamptonshire	Scotland A	Somerset	Wales
Division Three - Group A	Buckinghamshire	Cornwall	Devon	Dorset	Oxfordshire	Wiltshire			
Division Three - Group B	Cumbria	Derbyshire	Leicestershire and Rutland	Northumberland	Shropshire	Staffordshire			
Division Three - Group C	Essex	Cambridgeshire	Hertfordshire	Lincolnshire	Norfolk	Suffolk			

== Division One ==
Team	Pld	W	L	T	A	C	NRR	Ded	Pts
Middlesex (C)	8	7	1	0	0	0	+0.55	0	28
Sussex	8	6	2	0	0	0	+1.19	0	24
Kent	8	5	3	0	0	0	+0.67	0	20
Warwickshire	8	4	4	0	0	0	+0.38	0	16
Nottinghamshire	8	4	4	0	0	0	+0.09	0	16
Lancashire	8	4	4	0	0	0	–0.16	0	16
Surrey	8	3	5	0	0	0	–0.77	0	12
Yorkshire (R)	8	2	6	0	0	0	–0.66	0	8
Worcestershire (R)	8	1	7	0	0	0	–1.36	0	4

Source: ECB Women's Twenty20 Cup

== Division Two ==
Team	Pld	W	L	T	A	C	NRR	Ded	Pts
Hampshire (P)	8	7	1	0	0	0	+2.27	0	28
Wales (P)	8	7	1	0	0	0	+1.95	0	28
Scotland A	8	7	1	0	0	0	+0.63	0	28
Durham	8	5	3	0	0	0	–0.10	0	20
Somerset	8	4	4	0	0	0	+0.80	0	16
Cheshire	8	2	6	0	0	0	–0.86	0	8
Berkshire (R)	8	2	6	0	0	0	–0.74	0	8
Northamptonshire (R)	8	1	7	0	0	0	–1.90	0	4
Gloucestershire (R)	8	1	7	0	0	0	–2.20	0	4

Source: ECB Women's Twenty20 Cup

== Division Three ==
=== Group A ===
Team	Pld	W	L	T	A	C	NRR	Ded	Pts
Devon (P)	8	8	0	0	0	0	+4.09	0	32
Oxfordshire	8	5	3	0	0	0	+0.57	0	20
Cornwall	8	5	3	0	0	0	+0.09	0	20
Dorset	8	4	4	0	0	0	–0.84	0	16
Buckinghamshire	8	2	6	0	0	0	–1.67	0	8
Wiltshire	8	0	8	0	0	0	–3.16	0	0

Source: ECB Women's Twenty20 Cup

=== Group B ===
Team	Pld	W	L	T	A	C	NRR	Ded	Pts
Derbyshire (P)	8	7	1	0	0	0	+1.62	0	28
Staffordshire	8	6	2	0	0	0	+2.51	0	24
Leicestershire and Rutland	8	5	3	0	0	0	+0.13	0	20
Shropshire	8	2	6	0	0	0	–0.80	0	8
Northumberland	8	2	6	0	0	0	–1.53	0	8
Cumbria	8	2	6	0	0	0	–1.70	0	8

Source: ECB Women's Twenty20 Cup

=== Group C ===
Team	Pld	W	L	T	A	C	NRR	Ded	Pts
Essex (P)	8	7	1	0	0	0	+3.23	0	28
Lincolnshire	8	6	2	0	0	0	+1.66	0	24
Hertfordshire	8	4	4	0	0	0	–0.12	0	16
Norfolk	8	4	4	0	0	0	–0.78	0	16
Suffolk	8	3	5	0	0	0	–1.49	0	12
Cambridgeshire	8	0	8	0	0	0	–2.60	0	0

Source: ECB Women's Twenty20 Cup

== Statistics ==
=== Most runs ===
Player	Team	Matches	Innings	Runs	Average	HS	100s	50s
Kezia Hassall	Hampshire	8	8	311	62.20	75	0	4
Rachel Priest	Wales	8	8	275	39.28	106	1	2
Gabrielle Basketter	Wales	8	8	274	45.66	100*	1	1
Nikki Patel	Leicestershire and Rutland	8	8	257	42.83	70*	0	1
Beth Dodd	Essex	8	8	251	35.85	121*	1	0

Source: CricketArchive

=== Most wickets ===
Player	Team	Balls	Wickets	Average	BBI	5w
Providence Cowdrill	Hampshire	126	15	6.80	6/27	1
Rebecca Silk	Devon	174	15	7.00	5/6	1
Rebecca Grundy	Warwickshire	183	15	9.46	4/10	0
Ilenia Sims	Staffordshire	165	14	9.64	5/8	1
Georgia Davis	Warwickshire	186	14	10.42	3/16	0

Source: CricketArchive
