= 2018 Women's County Championship =

- Administrator: England and Wales Cricket Board
- Cricket format: 50 over
- Tournament format: League system
- Champions: Hampshire
- Participants: 36
- Most runs: Suzie Bates (358)
- Most wickets: Kirstie Gordon (22)

The 2018 Women's County One-Day Championship was the 22nd cricket Women's County Championship season. It ran from the beginning of May to the beginning of June and saw 33 county teams and teams representing Scotland, Wales and the Netherlands compete in a series of divisions. Hampshire Women won the County Championship as winners of the top division with Yorkshire finishing runners-up. The Championship was Hampshire's first and was achieved in their first season in the top division.

The tournament was followed by the 2018 Women's Twenty20 Cup and then by the 2018 Women's Cricket Super League, a professional tournament competed for by franchise teams.

== Competition format ==
Teams played matches within a series of divisions with the winners of the top division being crowned County Champions. Matches were played using a one day format with 50 overs per side.

The championship works on a points system with positions within the divisions being based on the average points of completed games. Points were awarded as follows:

Win: 10 points + bonus points.
Tie: 5 points + bonus points.
Loss: Bonus points.
Abandoned or cancelled: Match not counted to average.
Conceded: -5 points for the side conceding, 10 points for their opponent.

Bonus points are collected for batting and bowling. The bonus points for each match are retained if the match is completed.

- Batting

1.50 runs per over (RPO) or more: 1 point
2 RPO or more: 2 points
3 RPO or more: 3 points
4 RPO or more: 4 points

- Bowling

3-4 wickets taken: 1 point
5-6 wickets taken: 2 points
7-8 wickets taken: 3 points
9-10 wickets taken: 4 points

== Teams ==
The 2018 Championship was divided into three divisions: Division One and Division Two with eight teams each, and Division Three with 20 teams divided into five groups of four teams.

Teams in Division One and Two played each other once, while teams in each group of Division Three played each other twice.

Division One	Hampshire	Kent	Lancashire	Middlesex	Nottinghamshire	Somerset	Warwickshire	Yorkshire
Division Two	Berkshire	Derbyshire	Devon	Essex	Northamptonshire	Surrey	Sussex	Wales
Division Three – Group A	Scotland	Cumbria	Durham	Northumberland				
Division Three – Group B	Cornwall	Dorset	Netherlands	Wiltshire				
Division Three – Group C	Buckinghamshire	Gloucestershire	Hertfordshire	Oxfordshire				
Division Three – Group D	Cambridgeshire and Huntingdonshire	Lincolnshire	Norfolk	Suffolk				
Division Three – Group E	Leicestershire and Rutland	Shropshire	Staffordshire	Worcestershire				

== Division One ==
Team	Pld	W	L	T	A	Bat	Bowl	Ded	Pts	Avg.
Hampshire (C)	7	6	1	0	0	23	26	0	109	15.57
Yorkshire	7	6	1	0	0	22	24	0	106	15.14
Kent	7	4	3	0	0	22	21	0	83	11.86
Lancashire	7	3	4	0	0	22	19	0	71	10.14
Warwickshire	7	1	3	2	1	18	19	0	57	9.50
Nottinghamshire	7	2	4	1	0	19	19	0	63	9.00
Middlesex (R)	7	2	4	0	1	18	15	0	53	8.83
Somerset (R)	7	1	5	1	0	9	22	0	46	6.57

As of 3 June 2018 — Source: ECB Women's County Championship

== Division Two ==
Team	Pld	W	L	T	A	Bat	Bowl	Ded	Pts	Avg.
Sussex (P)	7	5	1	0	1	21	24	0	95	15.83
Surrey (P)	7	6	1	0	0	25	24	0	109	15.57
Wales	7	4	2	0	1	18	24	0	82	13.67
Devon	7	3	4	0	0	20	24	0	74	10.57
Berkshire	7	3	3	0	1	13	14	0	57	9.5
Essex (PO)	7	3	3	0	1	12	13	0	55	9.17
Derbyshire (R)	7	2	5	0	0	13	21	0	54	7.71
Northamptonshire (R)	7	0	7	0	0	12	20	0	32	4.57

As of 3 June 2018 — Source: ECB Women's County Championship

== Division Three ==
=== Group A ===
Team	Pld	W	L	T	A	Bat	Bowl	Ded	Pts	Avg.
Durham (PO)	6	5	1	0	0	22	20	0	92	15.33
Scotland	6	5	1	0	0	21	19	0	90	15
Cumbria	6	2	4	0	0	13	18	0	51	8.5
Northumberland	6	0	6	0	0	9	6	0	15	2.5

As of 28 May 2018 — Source: ECB Women's County Championship

=== Group B ===
Team	Pld	W	L	T	A	Bat	Bowl	Ded	Pts	Avg.
Cornwall (PO)	6	5	1	0	0	21	22	0	93	15.5
Netherlands	6	5	1	0	0	21	21	0	92	15.33
Wiltshire	6	1	5	0	0	8	10	0	28	4.67
Dorset	6	1	5	0	0	5	12	0	27	4.5

As of 28 May 2018 — Source: ECB Women's County Championship

=== Group C ===
Team	Pld	W	L	T	A	Bat	Bowl	Ded	Pts	Avg.
Oxfordshire (PO)	6	5	1	0	0	19	24	0	93	15.5
Gloucestershire	6	4	2	0	0	21	20	0	81	13.5
Buckinghamshire	6	3	3	0	0	16	18	0	64	10.67
Hertfordshire	6	0	6	0	0	11	11	0	22	3.67

As of 28 May 2018 — Source: ECB Women's County Championship

=== Group D ===
Team	Pld	W	L	T	A	LC	WC	Bat	Bowl	Ded	Pts	Avg.
Suffolk (PO)	6	5	1	0	0	0	0	19	23	0	92	15.33
Lincolnshire	6	4	2	0	0	0	0	15	17	0	72	12
Norfolk	6	1	4	0	0	0	1	9	16	0	45	7.5
Cambridgeshire and Huntingdonshire	6	1	4	0	0	1	0	8	9	0	22	3.67

As of 28 May 2018 — Source: ECB Women's County Championship

=== Group E ===
Team	Pld	W	L	T	A	Bat	Bowl	Ded	Pts	Avg.
Worcestershire (PO)	6	4	1	0	1	17	20	0	77	15.4
Staffordshire	6	3	2	0	1	18	19	0	67	13.4
Leicestershire and Rutland	6	3	2	0	1	13	13	0	56	11.2
Shropshire	6	0	5	0	1	8	10	0	18	3.6

As of 28 May 2018 — Source: ECB Women's County Championship

=== Promotion play-offs ===
Each of the teams finishing first in the groups in Division Three qualified for a series of promotion play-offs along with Essex who finished sixth in Division Two. The three winning sides will play in Division Two in 2019.

27 August 2018	Durham; 210 (49 overs)	v	Oxfordshire; 125 (44.4 overs)	Durham won by 85 runs
11:00; Scorecard	Durham; 210 (49 overs)	v	Oxfordshire; 125 (44.4 overs)	Bicester & North Oxford CC, Bicester; Umpires: John Reed and Graham Watkins
11:00; Scorecard	Ami Campbell 46 (41); Sophie Mitchelmore 4/43 (10 overs)		Carla Wood 26 (70); Helen Fenby 4/47 (10 overs)	Bicester & North Oxford CC, Bicester; Umpires: John Reed and Graham Watkins
Oxfordshire won the toss and elected to field.; Durham is promoted to 2019 Women's County Championship Division Two.				Bicester & North Oxford CC, Bicester; Umpires: John Reed and Graham Watkins

27 August 2018	Essex; 374/3 (50 overs)	v	Suffolk; 81 (36 overs)	Essex won by 293 runs
11:00; Scorecard	Essex; 374/3 (50 overs)	v	Suffolk; 81 (36 overs)	Long Melford CC, Long Melford; Umpires: Antony Levy and Peter Hinstridge
11:00; Scorecard	Cordelia Griffith 155* (120); Lizzie Shaw 1/49 (10 overs)		Penny Everett 19 (50); Anje Lague 3/7 (10 overs)	Long Melford CC, Long Melford; Umpires: Antony Levy and Peter Hinstridge
Suffolk won the toss and elected to field.; Essex remains in 2019 Women's County Championship Division Two.				Long Melford CC, Long Melford; Umpires: Antony Levy and Peter Hinstridge

27 August 2018	Worcestershire; 227/9 (50 overs)	v	Cornwall; 130 (38 overs)	Worcestershire won by 97 runs
11:00; Scorecard	Worcestershire; 227/9 (50 overs)	v	Cornwall; 130 (38 overs)	New Road, Worcester; Umpires: Ingeborg Bevers and Malinda Underdown
11:00; Scorecard	Chloe Hill 78 (86); Ellie Mitchell 3/47 (10 overs)		Rebecca Odgers 56 (57); Issy Wong 4/22 (10 overs)	New Road, Worcester; Umpires: Ingeborg Bevers and Malinda Underdown
Worcestershire won the toss and elected to bat.; Worcestershire is promoted to 2019 Women's County Championship Division Two.				New Road, Worcester; Umpires: Ingeborg Bevers and Malinda Underdown

== Statistics ==
=== Most runs ===
Player	Team	Matches	Innings	Runs	Average	HS	100s	50s
Suzie Bates	Hampshire	6	6	358	89.50	148	2	1
Emma Lamb	Lancashire	7	7	339	56.50	91	0	3
Kirstie White	Surrey	7	7	331	47.28	94	0	3
Kezia Hassall	Hertfordshire	6	6	309	77.25	132*	1	1
Nat Sciver	Surrey	4	4	273	91.00	180*	1	1

Source: CricketArchive

=== Most wickets ===
Player	Team	Balls	Wickets	Average	BBI	5w
Kirstie Gordon	Nottinghamshire	410	23	7.28	5/18	2
Hazelle Garton	Devon	396	22	5.95	5/18	1
Kellie Williams	Cornwall	353	19	6.31	5/24	1
Sophie Mitchelmore	Oxfordshire	296	18	7.44	4/20	0
Ellie Norton	Oxfordshire	291	16	8.93	5/9	1

Source: CricketArchive
