= Alexia Walker =

English cricketer (born 1982)

Personal information
- Full name: Alexia Laurette Walker
- Born: 26 November 1982 (age 43); St Leonards-on-Sea, East Sussex, England
- Batting: Right-handed
- Bowling: Right-arm fast-medium
- Role: All-rounder

International information
- National side: England (2001)
- ODI debut (cap 97): 10 August 2001 v Scotland
- Last ODI: 12 August 2001 v Ireland

Domestic team information
- Years: Team
- 1998–2015: Sussex
- 2023–present: Sussex

Career statistics
Competition	WODI	WLA	WT20
Matches	3	159	47
Runs scored	14	1,623	591
Batting average	14.00	18.65	17.90
100s/50s	0/0	1/6	0/3
Top score	7*	113*	61
Balls bowled	54	5,794	518
Wickets	1	157	29
Bowling average	29.00	20.80	18.68
5 wickets in innings	0	1	0
10 wickets in match	–	–	–
Best bowling	1/0	5/17	4/12
Catches/stumpings	1/–	52/–	14/–
- Source: CricketArchive, 6 March 2021

Alexia Laurette Walker (born 26 November 1982) is an English cricketer who plays as an all-rounder. She is a right-handed batter and right-arm fast-medium bowler. She appeared in three One Day Internationals for England in August 2001, making her debut against Scotland. In total she took one wicket and scored 14 runs. She played domestic cricket for Sussex from 1998 to 2015, before returning to play for them in 2023.

In June 2009 Walker was appointed as the cricket director at Brighton College, a co-educational private school in Brighton. She is the first woman cricket director at an English private school. Previously she was cricket performance manager at Loughborough University.

In January 2010 Walker became one of only three women to pass the ECB Level 4 Coaching Certificate and was believed to be the youngest candidate of either sex to gain the award.
