= 2020 Northern Diamonds season =

Northern Diamonds
2020 season
- Coach: Danielle Hazell
- Captain: Hollie Armitage
- RHFT: Runners-up
- Most runs: Sterre Kalis (197)
- Most wickets: Beth Langston (12)
- Most catches: Alex MacDonald (4)
- Most wicket-keeping dismissals: Bess Heath (8)

The 2020 season was Northern Diamonds' first season, in which they competed in the 50 over Rachael Heyhoe Flint Trophy following reforms to the structure of women's domestic cricket in England. The side topped the North Group of the competition, winning 5 of their 6 games, progressing to the final. However, they lost to Southern Vipers in the final by 38 runs.

After the ending of the Women's Cricket Super League in 2019, the ECB announced the beginning of a new "women's elite domestic structure". Eight teams were included in this new structure, with Northern Diamonds being one of the new teams, replacing Yorkshire Diamonds and representing the North East and Yorkshire. Due to the impact of the COVID-19 pandemic, only the Rachael Heyhoe Flint Trophy was able to take place. Northern Diamonds were captained by Hollie Armitage and coached by Danielle Hazell. They played two home matches at Headingley Cricket Ground and one at the Riverside Ground.

== Squad ==
Northern Diamonds named their squad on 19 August 2020. Age given is at the start of Northern Diamonds's first match of the season (29 August 2020).

Name	Nationality	Birth date	Batting style	Bowling style	Notes
Batters
Ami Campbell	England	6 June 1991 (aged 29)	Left-handed	Right-arm medium	
Leah Dobson	England	6 October 2001 (aged 18)	Right-handed	Right-arm medium	
Rachel Hopkins	England	19 July 1992 (aged 28)	Right-handed	Right-arm medium	
Sterre Kalis	Netherlands	30 August 1999 (aged 20)	Right-handed	Right-arm medium	
Lauren Winfield-Hill	England	16 August 1990 (aged 30)	Right-handed	Right-arm medium	
All-rounders
Hollie Armitage	England	14 June 1997 (aged 23)	Right-handed	Right-arm leg break	Captain
Katherine Brunt	England	2 July 1985 (aged 35)	Right-handed	Right-arm fast medium	
Jenny Gunn	England	9 May 1986 (aged 34)	Right-handed	Right-arm medium	
Alex MacDonald	England	3 October 1991 (aged 28)	Left-handed	Right-arm medium	
Nat Sciver	England	20 August 1992 (aged 28)	Right-handed	Right-arm medium	
Layla Tipton	England	19 March 2002 (aged 18)	Left-handed	Right-arm medium	
Wicket-keepers
Bess Heath	England	20 August 2001 (aged 19)	Right-handed	—	
Bowlers
Helen Fenby	England	23 November 1998 (aged 21)	Right-handed	Right-arm leg break	
Phoebe Graham	England	23 October 1991 (aged 28)	Right-handed	Right-arm medium	
Beth Langston	England	6 September 1992 (aged 27)	Right-handed	Right-arm medium	
Katie Levick	England	17 July 1991 (age 34)	Right-handed	Right-arm leg break	
Rachel Slater	England	20 November 2001 (aged 18)	Right-handed	Right-arm medium	
Linsey Smith	England	10 March 1995 (aged 25)	Left-handed	Slow left-arm orthodox	
Ella Telford	England	5 April 1999 (aged 21)	Right-handed	Right-arm medium	

== Rachael Heyhoe Flint Trophy ==
=== North Group ===
Pos	Team	Pld	W	L	T	NR	BP	Pts	NRR
1	Northern Diamonds	6	5	1	0	0	3	23	1.000
2	Central Sparks	6	3	3	0	0	1	13	−0.285
3	North West Thunder	6	2	4	0	0	1	9	−0.515
4	Lightning	6	2	4	0	0	0	8	−0.113

Source: ESPN Cricinfo

=== Fixtures ===
==== Group stage ====
29 August 2020
10:30 BST
Scorecard

Central Sparks; 144 (38.1 overs)	v	Northern Diamonds; 145/1 (24.1 overs)
Gwenan Davies 33 (44); Katherine Brunt 5/20 (9 overs)		Lauren Winfield-Hill 72 (71); Clare Boycott 1/5 (1 over)

Northern Diamonds won by 9 wickets
Edgbaston, Birmingham
Umpires: Jasmine Naeem and Sue Redfern

- Central Sparks won the toss and elected to bat.
- Points: Northern Diamonds 5, Central Sparks 0

31 August 2020
10:30 BST
Scorecard

Northern Diamonds; 226/9 (50 overs)	v	Lightning; 217/7 (50 overs)
Nat Sciver 104 (116); Kathryn Bryce 5/29 (10 overs)		Kathryn Bryce 71* (81); Nat Sciver 2/30 (10 overs)

Northern Diamonds won by 9 runs
Riverside Ground, Chester-le-Street
Umpires: Neil Pratt and Lina Nenova

- Northern Diamonds won the toss and elected to bat.
- Points: Northern Diamonds 4, Lightning 0

5 September 2020
10:30 BST
Scorecard

Lightning; 226 (49.1 overs)	v	Northern Diamonds; 229/8 (48.5 overs)
Sarah Bryce 51 (69); Alex MacDonald 2/31 (10 overs)		Jenny Gunn 50* (72); Lucy Higham 3/38 (10 overs)

Northern Diamonds won by 2 wickets
Grace Road, Leicester
Umpires: Joanne Ibbotson and Sue Redfern

- Northern Diamonds won the toss and elected to field.
- Points: Northern Diamonds 4, Lightning 0

10 September 2020
10:30 BST
Scorecard

Northern Diamonds; 248/8 (50 overs)	v	North West Thunder; 175/8 (50 overs)
Alex MacDonald 92 (110); Laura Jackson 2/23 (9 overs)		Alice Dyson 25* (51); Katie Levick 3/22 (10 overs)

Northern Diamonds won by 73 runs
Aigburth Cricket Ground, Liverpool
Umpires: Jasmine Naeem and Steve O'Shaughnessy

- North West Thunder won the toss and elected to field.
- Points: Northern Diamonds 5, North West Thunder 0

13 September 2020
10:30 BST
Scorecard

Northern Diamonds; 217 (50 overs)	v	Central Sparks; 218/4 (46.4 overs)
Sterre Kalis 87 (115); Elizabeth Russell 4/28 (9 overs)		Evelyn Jones 77 (114); Beth Langston 2/27 (8 overs)

Central Sparks won by 6 wickets
Headingley, Leeds
Umpires: Lina Nenova and Peter Hartley

- Northern Diamonds won the toss and elected to bat.
- Points: Central Sparks 4, Northern Diamonds 0

19 September 2020
10:30 BST
Scorecard

North West Thunder; 143 (42.5 overs)	v	Northern Diamonds; 144/4 (29.4 overs)
Natalie Brown 32 (41); Beth Langston 3/18 (8.5 overs)		Sterre Kalis 55* (67); Hannah Jones 1/28 (8 overs)

Northern Diamonds won by 6 wickets
Headingley, Leeds
Umpires: Joanne Ibbotson and Ian Ramage

- North West Thunder won the toss and elected to bat.
- Points: Northern Diamonds 5, North West Thunder 0

==== Final ====
27 September 2020
10:30 BST
Scorecard

Southern Vipers; 231 (49.5 overs)	v	Northern Diamonds; 193 (42.2 overs)
Georgia Adams 80 (102); Katie Levick 3/49 (8 overs)		Sterre Kalis 55 (75); Charlotte Taylor 6/34 (10 overs)

Southern Vipers won by 38 runs
Edgbaston, Birmingham
Umpires: Neil Pratt and Rob White
Player of the match: Charlotte Taylor (Southern Vipers)

- Northern Diamonds won the toss and elected to field.

== Statistics ==
=== Batting ===
Player	Matches	Innings	NO	Runs	HS	Average	Strike rate	100s	50s	4s	6s
Hollie Armitage	7	7	1	176	54*	29.33	62.19	0	1	21	2
Katherine Brunt	2	1	0	5	5	5.00	55.55	0	0	1	0
Ami Campbell	5	5	0	70	43	14.00	86.41	0	0	6	3
Helen Fenby	2	2	1	17	11	17.00	89.47	0	0	1	0
Phoebe Graham	5	4	2	60	29*	30.00	89.55	0	0	5	1
Jenny Gunn	7	6	2	149	50*	37.25	59.83	0	1	18	0
Bess Heath	7	5	0	37	23	7.40	63.79	0	0	3	1
Rachel Hopkins	4	4	0	54	35	13.50	35.76	0	0	5	1
Sterre Kalis	7	6	1	197	87	39.40	74.62	0	3	29	0
Beth Langston	7	5	1	93	37	23.23	78.81	0	0	7	0
Katie Levick	7	3	3	16	8*	–	66.66	0	0	2	0
Alex MacDonald	7	6	0	122	92	20.33	68.53	0	1	11	2
Nat Sciver	2	2	1	108	104	108.00	92.30	1	0	14	0
Linsey Smith	4	2	0	30	23	15.00	93.75	0	0	3	0
Layla Tipton	1	1	0	14	14	14.00	66.66	0	0	1	0
Lauren Winfield-Hill	3	3	0	93	72	31.00	91.17	0	1	11	2
Source: ESPN Cricinfo

=== Bowling ===
Player	Matches	Innings	Overs	Maidens	Runs	Wickets	BBI	Average	Economy	Strike rate
Hollie Armitage	7	5	28.2	1	122	6	2/16	20.33	4.30	28.3
Katherine Brunt	2	2	18.0	2	53	6	5/20	8.83	2.94	18.0
Helen Fenby	2	2	11.0	0	68	0	–	–	6.18	–
Phoebe Graham	5	5	37.4	1	146	2	2/29	73.00	3.87	113.0
Jenny Gunn	7	7	45.5	3	187	8	2/18	23.37	4.08	34.3
Beth Langston	7	7	56.1	5	233	12	3/18	19.41	4.14	28.0
Katie Levick	7	7	60.0	5	244	11	3/22	22.18	4.06	32.7
Alex MacDonald	7	3	22.4	0	81	4	2/31	20.25	3.57	34.0
Nat Sciver	2	2	15.0	1	46	2	2/30	23.00	3.06	45.0
Linsey Smith	4	4	30.0	3	102	4	2/36	25.50	3.40	45.0
Layla Tipton	1	1	2.0	0	12	0	–	–	6.00	–
Source: ESPN Cricinfo

=== Fielding ===
Player	Matches	Innings	Catches
Hollie Armitage	7	7	2
Katherine Brunt	2	2	1
Ami Campbell	5	5	1
Helen Fenby	2	2	0
Phoebe Graham	5	5	2
Jenny Gunn	7	7	0
Rachel Hopkins	4	4	0
Sterre Kalis	7	7	1
Beth Langston	7	7	1
Katie Levick	7	7	1
Alex MacDonald	7	7	4
Nat Sciver	2	2	0
Linsey Smith	4	4	0
Layla Tipton	1	1	0
Lauren Winfield-Hill	3	3	1
Source: ESPN Cricinfo

=== Wicket-keeping ===
Player	Matches	Innings	Catches	Stumpings
Bess Heath	7	7	8	0
Source: ESPN Cricinfo
