= 2022 Women's Twenty20 Cup =

English cricket season

- Dates: 18 April 2022 – 8 May 2022
- Administrator: England and Wales Cricket Board
- Cricket format: Twenty20
- Tournament format: League system
- Champions: No overall winner
- Participants: 35
- Matches: 131
- Most runs: Georgie Boyce (306)
- Most wickets: Anisha Patel (15)

The 2022 Women's Twenty20 Cup, known for sponsorship reasons as the 2022 Vitality Women's County T20, was the 13th edition of the Women's Twenty20 Cup, an English women's cricket Twenty20 domestic competition. It took place in April and May 2022, with 35 teams taking part, organised into eight regional groups. There was no overall winner, with Lancashire, Worcestershire, Warwickshire, Suffolk, Leicestershire and Rutland, Sussex, Middlesex and Devon winning their individual groups.

== Format ==
Teams played matches within a series of regional divisions, playing three matchdays, with most matchdays consisting of two matches between the same teams. Matches were played using a Twenty20 format. The group stages were followed by a group Finals Day, played on 8 May. In Group 1, the top four teams qualified for Finals Day (with the other three teams playing off at a different venue), whilst in Groups 2 to 7 all four teams qualified, with first playing fourth and second playing third in the semi-finals.

The groups worked on a points system with positions being based on total points. Points were awarded as follows:

Win: 4 points.
Tie: 2 points.
Loss: 0 points.
Abandoned/Cancelled: 1 point.

== Teams ==
The teams were divided into eight regional groups. Group 1 consisted of 7 teams, whilst Groups 2 to 7 consisted of 4 teams apiece.

Group 1	Cumbria	Derbyshire	Lancashire	North East Warriors	North Representative XI	Nottinghamshire	Yorkshire
Group 2	Berkshire	Shropshire	Staffordshire	Worcestershire			
Group 3	Gloucestershire	Somerset	Wales	Warwickshire			
Group 4	Cambridgeshire	Essex	Norfolk	Suffolk			
Group 5	Leicestershire and Rutland	Lincolnshire	Northamptonshire	Oxfordshire			
Group 6	Hampshire	Kent	Surrey	Sussex			
Group 7	Buckinghamshire	Hertfordshire	Huntingdonshire	Middlesex			
Group 8	Cornwall	Devon	Dorset	Wiltshire			

== Standings ==
Note: Teams highlighted in gold were champions of their group, by virtue of winning on Finals Day.

=== Group 1 ===
Pos	Team	Pld	W	L	T	NR	Pts	NRR
1	Lancashire (Q)	6	6	0	0	0	24	3.120
2	Yorkshire (Q)	6	4	2	0	0	16	−0.200
3	Derbyshire (Q)	6	3	3	0	0	12	0.010
4	Nottinghamshire (Q)	6	3	3	0	0	12	−0.020
5	North East Warriors	6	3	3	0	0	12	−0.520
6	North Representative XI	6	2	4	0	0	8	−0.620
7	Cumbria	6	0	6	0	0	0	−1.770

Source: Play-Cricket

advances to 1A Finals Day

=== Group 2 ===
Pos	Team	Pld	W	L	T	NR	Pts	NRR
1	Worcestershire	6	5	1	0	0	20	1.870
2	Staffordshire	6	4	2	0	0	16	0.330
3	Berkshire	6	3	3	0	0	12	−0.280
4	Shropshire	6	0	6	0	0	0	−1.970

Source: Play-Cricket

=== Group 3 ===
Pos	Team	Pld	W	L	T	NR	Pts	NRR
1	Warwickshire	6	5	1	0	0	20	2.440
2	Somerset	6	4	2	0	0	16	0.720
3	Wales	6	3	3	0	0	12	−0.890
4	Gloucestershire	6	0	6	0	0	0	−2.470

Source: Play-Cricket

=== Group 4 ===
Pos	Team	Pld	W	L	T	NR	Pts	NRR
1	Essex	6	6	0	0	0	24	3.920
2	Suffolk	6	4	2	0	0	16	−0.230
3	Cambridgeshire	6	2	4	0	0	8	−2.560
4	Norfolk	6	0	6	0	0	0	−1.790

Source: Play-Cricket

=== Group 5 ===
Pos	Team	Pld	W	L	T	NR	Pts	NRR
1	Northamptonshire	6	6	0	0	0	24	2.280
2	Oxfordshire	6	4	2	0	0	16	0.290
3	Leicestershire and Rutland	6	2	4	0	0	8	−1.240
4	Lincolnshire	6	0	6	0	0	0	−1.150

Source: Play-Cricket

=== Group 6 ===
Pos	Team	Pld	W	L	T	NR	Pts	NRR
1	Sussex	6	5	1	0	0	20	0.910
2	Kent	6	4	2	0	0	16	1.190
3	Hampshire	6	2	4	0	0	8	−1.000
4	Surrey	6	1	5	0	0	4	−1.350

Source: Play-Cricket

=== Group 7 ===
Pos	Team	Pld	W	L	T	NR	Pts	NRR
1	Middlesex	6	6	0	0	0	24	5.130
2	Hertfordshire	6	4	2	0	0	16	1.570
3	Buckinghamshire	6	1	5	0	0	4	−0.750
4	Huntingdonshire	6	1	5	0	0	4	−5.450

Source: Play-Cricket

=== Group 8 ===
Pos	Team	Pld	W	L	T	NR	Pts	NRR
1	Devon	6	5	0	0	1	21	1.410
2	Cornwall	6	3	2	0	1	13	−0.160
3	Wiltshire	6	2	4	0	0	8	−0.310
4	Dorset	6	1	5	0	0	4	−0.990

Source: Play-Cricket

== Fixtures ==
=== Group 1 ===
==== Group stage ====
18 April 2022
10:30 BST
Scorecard

Yorkshire; 142/4 (20 overs)	v	North East Warriors; 101/9 (20 overs)
Bess Heath 39 (30); Trudy Johnson 1/20 (3 overs)		Layla Tipton 45 (37)

Yorkshire won by 41 runs
Whitburn CC, Whitburn

- North East Warriors won the toss and elected to field.

18 April 2022
11:00 BST
Scorecard

Derbyshire; 106/8 (20 overs)	v	North Representative XI; 86/6 (20 overs)
Natasha Allen 32 (24); Hannah Knowles 3/8 (4 overs)		Summer Carrington 40 (55); Emma Thatcher 3/16 (4 overs)

Derbyshire won by 20 runs
Northern CC, Crosby

- Derbyshire won the toss and elected to bat.

18 April 2022
11:00 BST
Scorecard

Lancashire; 99/7 (20 overs)	v	Nottinghamshire; 50 (16.4 overs)
Natalie Brown 27 (30); Teresa Graves 2/12 (3 overs)		Teresa Graves 11 (20); Alex Hartley 4/5 (4 overs)

Lancashire won by 49 runs
Northern CC, Crosby

- Nottinghamshire won the toss and elected to field.

18 April 2022
13:30 BST
Scorecard

Yorkshire; 106/7 (20 overs)	v	Cumbria; 99/6 (20 overs)
Beth Langston 27 (39); Ellie Mason 2/13 (3 overs)		Ellie Mason 31 (26); Bethany Slater 2/12 (4 overs)

Yorkshire won by 7 runs
Whitburn CC, Whitburn

- Cumbria won the toss and elected to field.

18 April 2022
15:00 BST
Scorecard

Derbyshire; 135/7 (20 overs)	v	Lancashire; 136/3 (19.4 overs)
Kathryn Bryce 79* (57); Natalie Brown 4/21 (4 overs)		Danielle Collins 51 (58); Kathryn Bryce 2/16 (4 overs)

Lancashire won by 7 wickets
Northern CC, Crosby

- Derbyshire won the toss and elected to bat.

18 April 2022
15:00 BST
Scorecard

Nottinghamshire; 88/7 (20 overs)	v	North Representative XI; 89/2 (14.3 overs)
Amanda Knowling-Davies 18 (22); Summer Carrington 3/8 (3 overs)		Rebecca Duckworth 46* (40); Sophie Munro 1/12 (2 overs)

North Representative XI won by 8 wickets
Northern CC, Crosby

- Nottinghamshire won the toss and elected to bat.

18 April 2022
16:30 BST
Scorecard

North East Warriors; 150/5 (20 overs)	v	Cumbria; 74/7 (20 overs)
Sterre Kalis 63 (55); Emily Hetherington 1/14 (2 overs)		Olivia Brinsden 27* (49); Jenny McDowell 2/7 (2 overs)

North East Warriors won by 76 runs
Whitburn CC, Whitburn

- Cumbria won the toss and elected to field.

24 April 2022
10:30 BST
Scorecard

Lancashire; 127/4 (18 overs)	v	Cumbria; 72/5 (18 overs)
Natalie Brown 80 (61); Elizabeth Priddle 1/8 (2 overs)		Laura Marshall 24 (40); Georgie Boyce 2/3 (1 over)

Lancashire won by 55 runs
Egremont CC, Egremont

- Lancashire won the toss and elected to bat.
- Match reduced to 18 overs per side due to rain.

24 April 2022
11:00 BST
Scorecard

Nottinghamshire; 104/5 (20 overs)	v	North East Warriors; 74/9 (20 overs)
Teresa Graves 28 (26); Laura Ellison 3/18 (4 overs)		Sterre Kalis 19 (20); Lucy Higham 3/9 (4 overs)

Nottinghamshire won by 30 runs
Memorial Ground, Mirfield

- Nottinghamshire won the toss and elected to bat.

24 April 2022
11:00 BST
Scorecard

Derbyshire; 183/2 (20 overs)	v	Yorkshire; 134/5 (20 overs)
Bethany Harmer 70 (35); Bethany Slater 1/14 (2 overs)		Hollie Armitage 37 (31); Jessica Thatcher 3/34 (4 overs)

Derbyshire won by 49 runs
Moorlands CC, Mirfield

- Derbyshire won the toss and elected to bat.

24 April 2022
13:30 BST
Scorecard

Lancashire; 136/3 (18 overs)	v	North Representative XI; 59/7 (18 overs)
Georgie Boyce 79 (59); Hannah Jones 1/16 (3 overs)		Alice Dyson 15 (20); Phoebe Graham 3/8 (4 overs)

Lancashire won by 77 runs
Egremont CC, Egremont

- Lancashire won the toss and elected to bat.
- Match reduced to 18 overs per side due to rain.

24 April 2022
15:00 BST
Scorecard

Derbyshire; 83/6 (20 overs)	v	North East Warriors; 84/0 (12 overs)
Adrianna Darlow 38 (59); Layla Tipton 3/6 (4 overs)		Sterre Kalis 40 (39)

North East Warriors won by 10 wickets
Memorial Ground, Mirfield

- North East Warriors won the toss and elected to field.

24 April 2022
15:00 BST
Scorecard

Nottinghamshire; 114/9 (20 overs)	v	Yorkshire; 117/3 (17.4 overs)
Lucy Higham 25 (19); Grace Hall 2/9 (3 overs)		Hollie Armitage 54 (41); Teresa Graves 1/16 (4 overs)

Yorkshire won by 7 wickets
Moorlands CC, Mirfield
Umpires: Joanne Ibbotson and Jane Pratt

- Nottinghamshire won the toss and elected to bat.

24 April 2022
16:30 BST
Scorecard

Cumbria; 106/8 (18 overs)	v	North Representative XI; 109/1 (15.1 overs)
Ellie Mason 25 (28); Alice Dyson 4/19 (4 overs)		Rebecca Duckworth 43 (44); Liberty Heap 1/21 (3 overs)

North Representative XI won by 9 wickets
Egremont CC, Egremont

- Cumbria won the toss and elected to bat.
- Match reduced to 18 overs per side due to rain.

2 May 2022
10:30 BST
Scorecard

Cumbria; 90/6 (20 overs)	v	Nottinghamshire; 91/5 (14.5 overs)
Elizabeth Priddle 23 (26); Rebecca Widdowson 3/12 (4 overs)		Teresa Graves 29 (42); Lily Bell 1/6 (3 overs)

Nottinghamshire won by 5 wickets
John Fretwell Sporting Complex, Nettleworth

- Cumbria won the toss and elected to bat.

2 May 2022
11:00 BST
Scorecard

Lancashire; 174/3 (20 overs)	v	North East Warriors; 49 (17.1 overs)
Emma Lamb 76 (59); Maddy Atkinson 1/18 (3 overs)		Trudy Johnson 15 (21); Sophia Turner 2/5 (3 overs)

Lancashire won by 125 runs
Weetwood Playing Fields, Weetwood
Umpires: Richard Jones and C Chaplin

- Lancashire won the toss and elected to bat.

2 May 2022
11:00 BST
Scorecard

Yorkshire; 117/7 (20 overs)	v	North Representative XI; 111/2 (20 overs)
Beth Langston 30 (33); Summer Carrington 2/20 (4 overs)		Rebecca Duckworth 38 (53); Hollie Armitage 1/21 (4 overs)

Yorkshire won by 6 runs
Weetwood Playing Fields, Weetwood

- Yorkshire won the toss and elected to bat.

2 May 2022
13:30 BST
Scorecard

Derbyshire; 83 (19.3 overs)	v	Cumbria; 69/8 (20 overs)
Megan Pittman 20 (31); Lily Bell 4/19 (4 overs)		Ellie Mason 23 (29); Harriett Parkin 3/5 (3 overs)

Derbyshire won by 14 runs
John Fretwell Sporting Complex, Nettleworth

- Derbyshire won the toss and elected to bat.

2 May 2022
15:00 BST
Scorecard

North Representative XI; 114/5 (20 overs)	v	North East Warriors; 115/2 (17.2 overs)
Rebecca Duckworth 51 (57); Hayley Falla 3/19 (4 overs)		Laura Hockaday 34 (43); Emily Sutton 2/29 (4 overs)

North East Warriors won by 8 wickets
Weetwood Playing Fields, Weetwood

- North East Warriors won the toss and elected to field.

2 May 2022
15:00 BST
Scorecard

Yorkshire; 109/8 (20 overs)	v	Lancashire; 110/1 (12.5 overs)
Hollie Armitage 44 (31); Alex Hartley 3/13 (4 overs)		Georgie Boyce 64 (44); Sophie Richardson 1/6 (1 over)

Lancashire won by 9 wickets
Weetwood Playing Fields, Weetwood
Umpires: Richard Jones and C Chaplin

- Yorkshire won the toss and elected to bat.

2 May 2022
16:30 BST
Scorecard

Nottinghamshire; 123/5 (20 overs)	v	Derbyshire; 90/8 (20 overs)
Sophie Munro 59 (52); Emma Thatcher 2/11 (4 overs)		Jessica Smithurst 29 (29); Amelia Kite 2/10 (2 overs)

Nottinghamshire won by 33 runs
John Fretwell Sporting Complex, Nettleworth

- Nottinghamshire won the toss and elected to bat.

==== Finals Day ====
Semi-Final
8 May 2022
11:00 BST
Scorecard

Nottinghamshire; 115/5 (20 overs)	v	Lancashire; 119/0 (12.5 overs)
Lucy Higham 53 (46); Phoebe Graham 3/21 (4 overs)		Emma Lamb 62* (34)

Lancashire won by 10 wickets
Northern CC, Crosby
Umpires: Dave Halewood and Jeremy Clein

- Lancashire won the toss and elected to field.

Semi-Final
8 May 2022
11:00 BST
Scorecard

Derbyshire; 109/7 (20 overs)	v	Yorkshire; 113/1 (17.5 overs)
Megan Pittman 39 (48); Jessica Woolston 2/15 (3.5 overs)		Abigail Glen 53* (48); Adrianna Darlow 1/17 (4 overs)

Yorkshire won by 9 wickets
Northern CC, Crosby

- Derbyshire won the toss and elected to bat.

Final
8 May 2022
15:00 BST
Scorecard

Yorkshire; 83/9 (20 overs)	v	Lancashire; 87/2 (12.1 overs)
Hannah Buck 17 (19); Emma Lamb 5/5 (4 overs)		Georgie Boyce 37* (39); Grace Hall 1/15 (3 overs)

Lancashire won by 8 wickets
Northern CC, Crosby

- Yorkshire won the toss and elected to bat.

Note: Cumbria withdrew from the Group 1B Finals Day, meaning that North Representative XI and North East Warriors played a double-header matchday.

1B Match 1
8 May 2022
13:00 BST
Scorecard

North East Warriors; 119/3 (20 overs)	v	North Representative XI; 68/7 (20 overs)
Ciara Boaden 46* (58); Gaby Crabb 1/15 (2 overs)		Hannah Jones 17 (18); Laura Ellison 3/9 (3 overs)

North East Warriors won by 51 runs
Spondon Cricket Club, Spondon

- North East Warriors won the toss and elected to bat.

1B Match 2
8 May 2022
16:00 BST
Scorecard

North Representative XI; 73/5 (20 overs)	v	North East Warriors; 75/2 (12.1 overs)
Tilly Kesteven 24 (37); Emily Whiting 2/6 (2 overs)		Layla Tipton 51* (36); Caitlin McDonald 1/18 (3 overs)

North East Warriors won by 8 wickets
Spondon Cricket Club, Spondon

- North Representative XI won the toss and elected to bat.

=== Group 2 ===
==== Group stage ====
18 April 2022
11:00 BST
Scorecard

Shropshire; 88/7 (20 overs)	v	Berkshire; 92/0 (12.2 overs)
Alex Hale 24* (38); Laura Bailey 2/7 (3 overs)		Mia Rogers 50* (35)

Berkshire won by 10 wickets
Falkland CC, Newbury
Umpires: Nikki Batchelor and John Reed

- Shropshire won the toss and elected to bat.

18 April 2022
11:00 BST
Scorecard

Worcestershire; 144/3 (20 overs)	v	Staffordshire; 115/8 (20 overs)
Ami Campbell 38* (30); Lucy Shenton 2/33 (4 overs)		Davina Perrin 59 (43); Flora Bertwistle 2/27 (4 overs)

Worcestershire won by 29 runs
Milford Hall CC, Milford
Umpires: Angela Boote and Grace Bambury

- Worcestershire won the toss and elected to bat.

18 April 2022
15:00 BST
Scorecard

Berkshire; 116/6 (20 overs)	v	Shropshire; 94 (19.5 overs)
Ashleigh Muttitt 34 (32); Emily Perrin 3/18 (4 overs)		Lara Jones 24 (27); Freya Johnson 4/16 (2.5 overs)

Berkshire won by 22 runs
Falkland CC, Newbury
Umpires: Nikki Batchelor and John Reed

- Shropshire won the toss and elected to field.

18 April 2022
15:00 BST
Scorecard

Worcestershire; 115/4 (20 overs)	v	Staffordshire; 116/3 (18.3 overs)
Georgina Macey 34 (40); Davina Perrin 1/8 (3 overs)		Lydia Perry 42 (46); Clare Boycott 1/15 (3 overs)

Staffordshire won by 7 wickets
Milford Hall CC, Milford
Umpires: Angela Boote and Grace Bambury

- Staffordshire won the toss and elected to field.

24 April 2022
11:00 BST
Scorecard

Shropshire; 97/8 (20 overs)	v	Staffordshire; 101/2 (18.4 overs)
Emily Churms 28 (38); Grace Potts 3/10 (4 overs)		Abigail Freeborn 41* (45); Alice Dixon 2/8 (4 overs)

Staffordshire won by 8 wickets
Shifnal CC, Shifnal

- Staffordshire won the toss and elected to field.

24 April 2022
11:00 BST
Scorecard

Worcestershire; 149/4 (20 overs)	v	Berkshire; 102/7 (20 overs)
Clare Boycott 65 (54); Hollie Summerfield 2/20 (4 overs)		Mia Rogers 49 (45); Ellie Anderson 2/21 (4 overs)

Worcestershire won by 47 runs
Bromsgrove Cricket Club, Bromsgrove
Umpires: Martin Malin and Lawson Mayor

- Berkshire won the toss and elected to field.

24 April 2022
15:00 BST
Scorecard

Staffordshire; 132/7 (20 overs)	v	Shropshire; 101/8 (20 overs)
Helen Hughes 32 (33); Kate Brazier 2/17 (3 overs)		Harriet Shuker 22 (24); Steph Butler 3/14 (4 overs)

Staffordshire won by 31 runs
Shifnal CC, Shifnal

- Shropshire won the toss and elected to field.

24 April 2022
15:00 BST
Scorecard

Worcestershire; 165/6 (20 overs)	v	Berkshire; 124/6 (20 overs)
Georgina Macey 51 (35); Holly Rider 2/24 (4 overs)		Ashleigh Muttitt 42 (41); Flora Bertwistle 2/12 (4 overs)

Worcestershire won by 41 runs
Bromsgrove Cricket Club, Bromsgrove
Umpires: Martin Malin and Lawson Mayor

- Worcestershire won the toss and elected to bat.

2 May 2022
11:00 BST
Scorecard

Staffordshire; 170/4 (20 overs)	v	Berkshire; 121/5 (20 overs)
Davina Perrin 87 (75); Freya Johnson 2/46 (4 overs)		Amanda Potgieter 58 (40); Steph Butler 3/27 (4 overs)

Staffordshire won by 49 runs
Fordhouses CC, Fordhouses, Wolverhampton
Umpires: Jim Arnold and Grace Bambury

- Staffordshire won the toss and elected to bat.

2 May 2022
11:00 BST
Scorecard

Worcestershire; 164/6 (20 overs)	v	Shropshire; 107 (18.2 overs)
Georgina Macey 55 (40); Alice Dixon 2/39 (4 overs)		Amy Weir 27 (37); Ellie Anderson 3/8 (2.2 overs)

Worcestershire won by 57 runs
Bromsgrove Cricket Club, Bromsgrove
Umpires: Robert Murphy and Andrew Birtwistle

- Shropshire won the toss and elected to field.

2 May 2022
15:00 BST
Scorecard

Berkshire; 94/6 (10 overs)	v	Staffordshire; 61/7 (10 overs)
Poppy Tulloch 30 (19); Steph Butler 2/6 (2 overs)		Davina Perrin 11 (14)

Berkshire won by 33 runs
Fordhouses CC, Fordhouses, Wolverhampton
Umpires: Jim Arnold and Grace Bambury

- Berkshire won the toss and elected to bat.
- Match reduced to 10 overs per side due to rain.

2 May 2022
15:00 BST
Scorecard

Worcestershire; 122/5 (20 overs)	v	Shropshire; 63 (17.5 overs)
Emily Arlott 31* (31); Laura Smitten 2/13 (3 overs)		Amy Griffiths 29 (43); Charis Pavely 3/7 (4 overs)

Worcestershire won by 59 runs
Bromsgrove Cricket Club, Bromsgrove
Umpires: Robert Murphy and Andrew Birtwistle

- Worcestershire won the toss and elected to bat.

==== Finals Day ====
Semi-Final
8 May 2022
10:30 BST
Scorecard

Worcestershire; 216/3 (20 overs)	v	Shropshire; 92/8 (20 overs)
Ami Campbell 70* (47); Kate Brazier 1/22 (2 overs)		Natasha Smitten 30* (54); Sarah Glenn 5/15 (4 overs)

Worcestershire won by 124 runs
Falkland CC, Newbury

- Shropshire won the toss and elected to field.

Semi-Final
8 May 2022
13:30 BST
Scorecard

Staffordshire; 125/8 (20 overs)	v	Berkshire; 121/6 (20 overs)
Davina Perrin 30 (36); Hollie Summerfield 2/20 (4 overs)		Amanda Potgieter 36 (38); Steph Butler 3/18 (4 overs)

Staffordshire won by 4 runs
Falkland CC, Newbury
Umpires: Lizzy Condor and Nikki Batchelor

- Staffordshire won the toss and elected to bat.

Final
8 May 2022
16:30 BST
Scorecard

Worcestershire; 168/7 (20 overs)	v	Staffordshire; 150 (18.4 overs)
Ami Campbell 80 (47); Davina Perrin 2/26 (4 overs)		Poppy Davies 30 (21); Ellie Anderson 3/20 (2.4 overs)

Worcestershire won by 18 runs
Falkland CC, Newbury

- Worcestershire won the toss and elected to bat.

=== Group 3 ===
==== Group stage ====
18 April 2022
11:00 BST
Scorecard

Somerset; 132/7 (20 overs)	v	Gloucestershire; 98/5 (20 overs)
Nicole Harvey 35 (43); Chloe Skelton 2/17 (2 overs)		Chloe Skelton 38 (45); Lorraine Szczepanski 1/17 (4 overs)

Somerset won by 34 runs
Thornbury CC, Thornbury
Umpires: Yvonne Dolphin-Cooper and Bhavin Radia

- Gloucestershire won the toss and elected to field.

18 April 2022
11:00 BST
Scorecard

Wales; 125/5 (20 overs)	v	Warwickshire; 114/8 (20 overs)
Gabrielle Basketter 46 (41); Georgia Davis 2/23 (4 overs)		Ria Fackrell 22 (27)

Wales won by 11 runs
Edgbaston Foundation Ground, Birmingham
Umpires: NN Owen and Kashif Sumra

- Warwickshire won the toss and elected to field.

18 April 2022
15:00 BST
Scorecard

Gloucestershire; 108/7 (20 overs)	v	Somerset; 111/5 (18.1 overs)
Katie Jones 18 (15); Lorraine Szczepanski 3/21 (4 overs)		Sophie Luff 56* (53); Millie Squire 2/16 (4 overs)

Somerset won by 5 wickets
Thornbury CC, Thornbury
Umpires: Yvonne Dolphin-Cooper and Bhavin Radia

- Gloucestershire won the toss and elected to bat.

18 April 2022
15:00 BST
Scorecard

Wales; 128/6 (20 overs)	v	Warwickshire; 132/3 (15.5 overs)
Bethan Gammon 50 (36); Thea Brookes 2/18 (4 overs)		Issy Wong 53 (33); Sara Phillips 1/12 (1 over)

Warwickshire won by 7 wickets
Edgbaston Foundation Ground, Birmingham
Umpires: NN Owen and Kashif Sumra

- Wales won the toss and elected to bat.

24 April 2022
11:00 BST
Scorecard

Wales; 161/6 (20 overs)	v	Gloucestershire; 147/8 (20 overs)
Georgia Hennessy 63 (46); Alice Hill 2/19 (4 overs)		Fran Wilson 80 (42); Ffion Wynne 4/31 (4 overs)

Wales won by 14 runs
Ynystawe CC, Ynystawe, Swansea
Umpires: Clive Medcalf and Martin Wale

- Gloucestershire won the toss and elected to field.

24 April 2022
11:00 BST
Scorecard

Warwickshire; 171/5 (20 overs)	v	Somerset; 122 (19.4 overs)
Evelyn Jones 93* (60); Lauren Filer 2/11 (2 overs)		Sophie Luff 45 (40); Issy Wong 3/15 (2.4 overs)

Warwickshire won by 49 runs
County Ground, Taunton
Umpires: Yvonne Dolphin-Cooper and T Boylan

- Somerset won the toss and elected to field.

24 April 2022
15:00 BST
Scorecard

Gloucestershire; 111 (20 overs)	v	Wales; 112/3 (15.3 overs)
Beatrix Ellis 25 (25); Lauren Parfitt 3/19 (3 overs)		Georgia Hennessy 37 (28); Lucy Gladdy 2/31 (3.3 overs)

Wales won by 7 wickets
Ynystawe CC, Ynystawe, Swansea
Umpires: Clive Medcalf and Martin Wale

- Gloucestershire won the toss and elected to bat.

24 April 2022
15:00 BST
Scorecard

Warwickshire; 101/8 (20 overs)	v	Somerset; 75 (19.1 overs)
Georgia Davis 44* (50); Niamh Holland 3/11 (4 overs)		Emily Edgcombe 20 (35); Anisha Patel 4/14 (3.1 overs)

Warwickshire won by 26 runs
County Ground, Taunton
Umpires: Yvonne Dolphin-Cooper and T Boylan

- Warwickshire won the toss and elected to bat.

2 May 2022
11:00 BST
Scorecard

Warwickshire; 190/8 (20 overs)	v	Gloucestershire; 70 (19.5 overs)
Marie Kelly 99 (61); Chloe Skelton 4/24 (3 overs)		Chloe Skelton 11 (27); Georgia Davis 5/14 (4 overs)

Warwickshire won by 120 runs
Thornbury CC, Thornbury
Umpires: Marlon Zoglowek and R Scott

- Gloucestershire won the toss and elected to field.

2 May 2022
11:00 BST
Scorecard

Wales; 39/3 (5 overs)	v	Somerset; 42/0 (2.4 overs)
Georgia Hennessy 15 (9); Emily Edgcombe 2/10 (2 overs)		Nat Wraith 28* (10)

Somerset won by 10 wickets
Taunton Vale Sports Club Ground, Taunton
Umpires: Marilyn MacQueen and Ben Peverall

- Somerset won the toss and elected to field.
- Match reduced to 5 overs per side due to rain.

2 May 2022
15:00 BST
Scorecard

Gloucestershire; 114 (19.5 overs)	v	Warwickshire; 116/2 (10.5 overs)
Katie Jones 40 (33); Anisha Patel 3/15 (3.5 overs)		Marie Kelly 60 (27)

Warwickshire won by 8 wickets
Thornbury CC, Thornbury
Umpires: Marlon Zoglowek and R Scott

- Gloucestershire won the toss and elected to bat.

2 May 2022
15:00 BST
Scorecard

Somerset; 105/9 (20 overs)	v	Wales; 95/9 (20 overs)
Sophie Luff 46 (45); Claire Nicholas 4/20 (4 overs)		Alex Griffiths 21 (16); Emily Edgcombe 3/12 (3 overs)

Somerset won by 10 runs
Taunton Vale Sports Club Ground, Taunton
Umpires: Marilyn MacQueen and Ben Peverall

- Wales won the toss and elected to field.

==== Finals Day ====
Semi-Final
8 May 2022
10:30 BST
Scorecard

Warwickshire; 68 (20 overs)	v	Gloucestershire; 70/3 (12.3 overs)
Fran Wilson 28 (24); Anisha Patel 4/7 (4 overs)		Thea Brookes 36* (37); Chloe Skelton 1/13 (2 overs)

Warwickshire won by 7 wickets
Edgbaston Foundation Ground, Birmingham
Umpires: Grace Bambury and M Waters

- Warwickshire won the toss and elected to field.

Semi-Final
8 May 2022
13:30 BST
Scorecard

Wales; 122/6 (20 overs)	v	Somerset; 124/4 (16.2 overs)
Bethan Gammon 47 (53); Nicole Harvey 2/18 (4 overs)		Nat Wraith 74* (49); Nicole Reid 2/20 (2.2 overs)

Somerset won by 6 wickets
Edgbaston Foundation Ground, Birmingham

- Wales won the toss and elected to bat.

Final
8 May 2022
16:30 BST
Scorecard

Somerset; 140/7 (20 overs)	v	Warwickshire; 143/6 (19.1 overs)
Sophie Luff 56 (47); Bethan Ellis 3/14 (2 overs)		Bethan Ellis 57* (45); Emily Edgcombe 2/12 (3.1 overs)

Warwickshire won by 4 wickets
Edgbaston Foundation Ground, Birmingham
Umpires: Kashif Sumra and M Waters

- Somerset won the toss and elected to bat.

=== Group 4 ===
==== Group stage ====
18 April 2022
11:00 BST
Scorecard

Cambridgeshire; 98/7 (20 overs)	v	Essex; 99/2 (8.4 overs)
Olivia Welham 24* (26); Emily Dack 2/13 (3 overs)		Jessica Olorenshaw 42* (21); Jemaira Vestey 2/19 (2 overs)

Essex won by 8 wickets
Burwell CC, Burwell

- Essex won the toss and elected to field.

18 April 2022
11:00 BST
Scorecard

Suffolk; 123/4 (20 overs)	v	Norfolk; 105/5 (20 overs)
Natalie Samuels 43 (48); Maddy Reynolds 2/25 (4 overs)		Emma Thompson 42 (42); Amelie Clarke 2/10 (4 overs)

Suffolk won by 18 runs
Old Buckenham Hall Cricket Ground, Attleborough
Umpires: Peter Sadler and Nigel Crickmore

- Norfolk won the toss and elected to field.

18 April 2022
15:00 BST
Scorecard

Essex; 204/4 (20 overs)	v	Cambridgeshire; 63 (11.5 overs)
Scarlett Hughes 70 (47); Alice Cross 1/21 (2 overs)		Jasmine Westley 25 (18); Katie Midwood 4/7 (4 overs)

Essex won by 141 runs
Burwell CC, Burwell

- Essex won the toss and elected to bat.

18 April 2022
15:00 BST
Scorecard

Norfolk; 76/8 (20 overs)	v	Suffolk; 79/1 (14.5 overs)
Jade Hoyte 18 (28); Lauren Smith 2/12 (4 overs)		Petra Tweedy 40* (38); Jade Hoyte 1/13 (4 overs)

Suffolk won by 9 wickets
Old Buckenham Hall Cricket Ground, Attleborough
Umpires: Peter Sadler and Nigel Crickmore

- Norfolk won the toss and elected to bat.

24 April 2022
11:00 BST
Scorecard

Essex; 156/3 (20 overs)	v	Norfolk; 93/5 (20 overs)
Scarlett Hughes 50 (36); Jade Hoyte 2/29 (4 overs)		May Drinkell 36* (46); Emma Jones 2/15 (2 overs)

Essex won by 63 runs
Billericay CC, Billericay
Umpires: Lee Cullum and Todd Holland

- Norfolk won the toss and elected to field.

24 April 2022
11:00 BST
Scorecard

Suffolk	v	Cambridgeshire

Suffolk won via walk-over
Victory Ground, Bury St Edmunds

24 April 2022
15:00 BST
Scorecard

Norfolk; 82/9 (20 overs)	v	Essex; 85/3 (10.3 overs)
Ellie Stanley 22 (36); Emily Dack 2/8 (3 overs)		Scarlett Hughes 42 (29); April Herathge 1/13 (2 overs)

Essex won by 7 wickets
Billericay CC, Billericay
Umpires: Lee Cullum and Todd Holland

- Norfolk won the toss and elected to bat.

24 April 2022
15:00 BST
Scorecard

Suffolk	v	Cambridgeshire

Suffolk won via walk-over
Victory Ground, Bury St Edmunds

2 May 2022
11:00 BST
Scorecard

Cambridgeshire; 132/4 (20 overs)	v	Norfolk; 120/5 (20 overs)
Kelly Haynes 38 (28); Daisy Eke 1/18 (4 overs)		Ellie Stanley 38 (35); Isabella James 2/14 (4 overs)

Cambridgeshire won by 12 runs
Old Buckenham Hall Cricket Ground, Attleborough
Umpires: Steve Utting and Peter Sadler

- Norfolk won the toss and elected to field.

2 May 2022
11:00 BST
Scorecard

Essex; 171/3 (20 overs)	v	Suffolk; 127/9 (20 overs)
Kelly Castle 75 (48); Evie Booker 1/15 (3 overs)		Lauren Smith 29 (38); Katie Midwood 2/17 (4 overs)

Essex won by 44 runs
Woolpit CC, Woolpit
Umpires: Angela Tuff and Tracey Murphy

- Essex won the toss and elected to bat.

2 May 2022
15:00 BST
Scorecard

Norfolk; 111/8 (20 overs)	v	Cambridgeshire; 112/2 (17.4 overs)
May Drinkell 28 (19); Jasmine Westley 2/13 (4 overs)		May Busher 42 (43); Jade Hoyte 1/12 (2 overs)

Cambridgeshire won by 8 wickets
Old Buckenham Hall Cricket Ground, Attleborough
Umpires: Steve Utting and Peter Sadler

- Norfolk won the toss and elected to bat.

2 May 2022
15:00 BST
Scorecard

Suffolk; 113 (19 overs)	v	Essex; 115/3 (16 overs)
Natalie Samuels 23 (18); Grace Poole 3/12 (4 overs)		Jessica Bird 23 (22); Poppy Sidhu 1/14 (2 overs)

Essex won by 7 wickets
Woolpit CC, Woolpit
Umpires: Angela Tuff and Tracey Murphy

- Suffolk won the toss and elected to bat.

==== Finals Day ====
Semi-Final
8 May 2022
10:30 BST
Scorecard

Essex; 152/6 (20 overs)	v	Norfolk; 90/5 (20 overs)
Kelly Castle 62 (46); Amy Cubitt 1/17 (2 overs)		Ellie Stanley 24 (25); Bella Howarth 1/3 (2 overs)

Essex won by 62 runs
Sawston CC, Sawston

- Norfolk won the toss and elected to field.

Semi-Final
8 May 2022
13:30 BST
Scorecard

Cambridgeshire; 101 (19.3 overs)	v	Suffolk; 102/3 (14.2 overs)
Jessica Olorenshaw 31 (30); Lauren Swinburne 4/20 (4 overs)		Lauren Smith 58 (44); Jasmine Westley 2/14 (4 overs)

Suffolk won by 7 wickets
Sawston CC, Sawston

- Cambridgeshire won the toss and elected to bat.

Final
8 May 2022
16:30 BST
Scorecard

Essex; 110/9 (20 overs)	v	Suffolk; 111/5 (20 overs)
Tilly Callaghan 28 (46); Lauren Smith 5/9 (4 overs)		Petra Tweedy 29 (33); Kelly Castle 2/15 (3 overs)

Suffolk won by 5 wickets
Sawston CC, Sawston

- Essex won the toss and elected to bat.
- Lauren Smith (Suffolk) took a hat-trick.

=== Group 5 ===
==== Group stage ====
18 April 2022
11:00 BST
Scorecard

Lincolnshire; 78/8 (20 overs)	v	Leicestershire and Rutland; 79/5 (19.3 overs)
Alex MacDonald 34 (50); Grace Ballinger 3/6 (4 overs)		Katie Winterton 17* (31); Caitlin Phillips 2/8 (4 overs)

Leicestershire and Rutland won by 5 wickets
Loughborough Town, Loughborough

- Leicestershire and Rutland won the toss and elected to field.

18 April 2022
11:00 BST
Scorecard

Oxfordshire; 82/9 (20 overs)	v	Northamptonshire; 85/3 (11.2 overs)
Abi Currie 23 (27); Josie Groves 2/7 (4 overs)		Jodi Grewcock 49* (32); Emilia Bartram 3/24 (4 overs)

Northamptonshire won by 7 wickets
Geddington Sports Ground, Geddington
Umpires: Della Rebours and Peter Laughlin

- Northamptonshire won the toss and elected to field.

18 April 2022
15:00 BST
Scorecard

Lincolnshire; 131/1 (20 overs)	v	Leicestershire and Rutland; 132/2 (18.3 overs)
Alex MacDonald 56* (51); Matilda Price 1/34 (4 overs)		Grace Ballinger 59* (56); Aimee Simms 1/27 (4 overs)

Leicestershire and Rutland won by 8 wickets
Loughborough Town, Loughborough

- Leicestershire and Rutland won the toss and elected to field.

18 April 2022
15:00 BST
Scorecard

Oxfordshire; 98/3 (20 overs)	v	Northamptonshire; 100/5 (18.5 overs)
Aimee Diab 30* (29); Josie Groves 1/3 (2 overs)		Bethan Solomon 34 (45); Chloe Westbury 2/6 (3 overs)

Northamptonshire won by 5 wickets
Geddington Sports Ground, Geddington
Umpires: Della Rebours and Peter Laughlin

- Northamptonshire won the toss and elected to field.

24 April 2022
11:00 BST
Scorecard

Lincolnshire; 45 (16 overs)	v	Northamptonshire; 46/1 (7.4 overs)
Aimee Simms 17 (24); Rachael Potter 2/9 (4 overs)		Jodi Grewcock 19* (28); Aimee Simms 1/11 (3 overs)

Northamptonshire won by 9 wickets
Gorse Lane, Grantham
Umpires: Andy Milne and Nick Wilson

- Northamptonshire won the toss and elected to field.

24 April 2022
11:00 BST
Scorecard

Leicestershire and Rutland; 84/9 (20 overs)	v	Oxfordshire; 87/1 (16 overs)
Bex Coe 15 (26); Chloe Westbury 3/15 (4 overs)		Carla Wood 41* (50); Lucy Weston 1/20 (3 overs)

Oxfordshire won by 9 wickets
Bicester & North Oxford CC, Bicester

- Oxfordshire won the toss and elected to field.

24 April 2022
15:00 BST
Scorecard

Northamptonshire; 128/3 (20 overs	v	Lincolnshire; 109/2 (20 overs)
Patricia Hankins 32* (39); Aimee Simms 2/20 (4 overs)		Millie Greenwood 45* (66); Bethany Ascott 1/17 (3 overs)

Northamptonshire won by 19 runs
Gorse Lane, Grantham
Umpires: Andy Milne and Nick Wilson

- Northamptonshire won the toss and elected to bat.

24 April 2022
15:00 BST
Scorecard

Oxfordshire; 127/5 (20 overs)	v	Leicestershire and Rutland; 97 (19.4 overs)
Lottie Oxton 35 (24); Lucy Weston 2/15 (3 overs)		Matilda Prince 28* (38); Chloe Westbury 2/2 (2 overs)

Oxfordshire won by 30 runs
Bicester & North Oxford CC, Bicester

- Leicestershire and Rutland won the toss and elected to field.

2 May 2022
11:00 BST
Scorecard

Northamptonshire; 142/6 (20 overs)	v	Leicestershire and Rutland; 77/8 (20 overs)
Jodi Grewcock 65 (51); D'Nica Roff 2/21 (3 overs)		Collette Wale 23 (54); Rachael Potter 3/11 (4 overs)

Northamptonshire won by 65 runs
Geddington Sports Ground, Geddington
Umpires: Alan Bindley and Roger Barker

- Leicestershire and Rutland won the toss and elected to field

2 May 2022
11:00 BST
Scorecard

Lincolnshire; 91/6 (20 overs)	v	Oxfordshire; 92/2 (16.3 overs)
Millie Greenwood 40* (66); Chloe Westbury 3/9 (4 overs)		Megan Jones 38 (40); Carly Rush 1/6 (2 overs)

Oxfordshire won by 8 wickets
Bicester & North Oxford CC, Bicester

- Oxfordshire won the toss and elected to field.

2 May 2022
15:00 BST
Scorecard

Leicestershire and Rutland; 84/7 (20 overs)	v	Northamptonshire; 85/6 (13.4 overs)
Amber Mays 22 (35); Laura Crofts 3/5 (4 overs)		Jodi Grewcock 29 (29); D'Nica Roff 3/21 (3 overs)

Northamptonshire won by 4 wickets
Geddington Sports Ground, Geddington
Umpires: Roger Barker and Alan Bindley

- Northamptonshire won the toss and elected to field.

2 May 2022
15:00 BST
Scorecard

Oxfordshire; 99/7 (20 overs)	v	Lincolnshire; 84/4 (20 overs)
Isobel Kirby 20* (28); Carly Rush 2/15 (3 overs)		Emily Marriott 28* (43); Chloe Westbury 2/20 (4 overs)

Oxfordshire won by 15 runs
Bicester & North Oxford CC, Bicester

- Oxfordshire won the toss and elected to bat.

==== Finals Day ====
Semi-Final
8 May 2022
10:30 BST
Scorecard

Lincolnshire; 51 (18.1 overs)	v	Northamptonshire; 52/1 (8.2 overs)
Aimee Simms 16 (33); Josie Groves 3/9 (4 overs)		Rachael Potter 29* (30); Emily Marriott 1/12 (2.2 overs)

Northamptonshire won by 9 wickets
Grace Road, Leicester

- Northamptonshire won the toss and elected to field.

Semi-Final
8 May 2022
13:30 BST
Scorecard

Oxfordshire; 92 (19.3 overs)	v	Leicestershire and Rutland; 93/5 (15.5 overs)
Megan Jones 16 (23); Lucy Weston 3/19 (4 overs)		Sophie Bennett 32* (27); Emilia Bartram 2/20 (4 overs)

Leicestershire and Rutland won by 5 wickets
Grace Road, Leicester

- Leicestershire and Rutland won the toss and elected to field.

Final
8 May 2022
16:30 BST
Scorecard

Northamptonshire; 100/7 (20 overs)	v	Leicestershire and Rutland; 101/3 (18.5 overs)
Florence Miller 53* (59); Grace Ballinger 3/14 (4 overs)		Grace Ballinger 50* (58)

Leicestershire and Rutland won by 7 wickets
Grace Road, Leicester
Umpires: Della Rebours and Nic Owen

- Leicestershire and Rutland won the toss and elected to field.

=== Group 6 ===
==== Group stage ====
18 April 2022
11:00 BST
Scorecard

Hampshire; 88/9 (20 overs)	v	Kent; 89/0 (8.2 overs)
Finty Trussler 29* (45); Alice Davidson-Richards 4/11 (4 overs)		Sarah Bryce 45* (29)

Kent won by 10 wickets
Totting & Eling CC, Totton
Umpires: A Antony and Sarah Bartlett

- Kent won the toss and elected to field.
- Alice Davidson-Richards (Kent) took a hat-trick.

18 April 2022
11:00 BST
Scorecard

Surrey; 124/5 (20 overs)	v	Sussex; 88 (18.2 overs)
Aylish Cranstone 40 (43); Tara Norris 2/24 (4 overs)		Chiara Green 16* (25); Eva Gray 3/17 (3 overs)

Surrey won by 36 runs
Wimbledon Cricket Club Ground, Wimbledon
Umpires: Lizzie Condor and MZ Juniper

- Sussex won the toss and elected to field.

18 April 2022
15:00 BST
Scorecard

Hampshire; 127/8 (20 overs)	v	Kent; 129/3 (16.5 overs)
Ella Chandler 33 (41); Kirstie Gordon 3/12 (4 overs)		Phoebe Franklin 48 (50); Charlotte Taylor 1/20 (4 overs)

Kent won by 7 wickets
Totting & Eling CC, Totton
Umpires: A Antony and Sarah Bartlett

- Kent won the toss and elected to field.

18 April 2022
15:00 BST
Scorecard

Sussex; 147/6 (20 overs)	v	Surrey; 107/9 (20 overs)
Ella McCaughan 37 (34); Danielle Gregory 2/25 (4 overs)		Alice Capsey 26 (16); Tara Norris 4/11 (4 overs)

Sussex won by 40 runs
Wimbledon Cricket Club Ground, Wimbledon
Umpires: Lizzie Condor and MZ Juniper

- Sussex won the toss and elected to bat.

24 April 2022
11:00 BST
Scorecard

Surrey; 93 (19.4 overs)	v	Kent; 94/7 (19.1 overs)
Izzy Berry 18 (25); Kirstie Gordon 3/20 (4 overs)		Grace Scrivens 25 (36); Danielle Gregory 2/15 (4 overs)

Kent won by 3 wickets
Polo Farm, Canterbury
Umpires: Mel Juniper and Aaron Page

- Kent won the toss and elected to field.

24 April 2022
11:00 BST
Scorecard

Hampshire; 117/8 (20 overs)	v	Sussex; 121/4 (17 overs)
Maia Bouchier 73 (57); Georgia Adams 4/16 (4 overs)		Freya Kemp 47* (32); Poppy-Jay Watkins 2/21 (4 overs)

Sussex won by 6 wickets
Brighton Aldridge Community Academy Ground, Brighton

- Sussex won the toss and elected to field.

24 April 2022
15:00 BST
Scorecard

Kent; 176/3 (20 overs)	v	Surrey; 96 (19.4 overs)
Alice Davidson-Richards 67* (37); Chloe Brewer 1/21 (3 overs)		Chloe Brewer 32 (30); Kalea Moore 2/4 (2 overs)

Kent won by 80 runs
Polo Farm, Canterbury
Umpires: Mel Juniper and Aaron Page

- Kent won the toss and elected to bat.

24 April 2022
15:00 BST
Scorecard

Sussex; 121/4 (20 overs)	v	Hampshire; 96/7 (20 overs)
Isabelle Collis 35 (40); Alice Monaghan 1/18 (4 overs)		Alice Monaghan 34 (45); Ella McCaughan 3/6 (1 over)

Sussex won by 25 runs
Brighton Aldridge Community Academy Ground, Brighton

- Sussex won the toss and elected to bat.

2 May 2022
11:00 BST
Scorecard

Surrey; 79/9 (20 overs)	v	Hampshire; 80/4 (12.5 overs)
Rhianna Southby 19 (25); Gemma Porter 3/11 (3 overs)		Katie George 35 (25); Amy Gordon 1/11 (2.5 overs)

Hampshire won by 6 wickets
Chipstead Coulsdon & Walcountians CC, Chipstead
Umpires: Mel Juniper and Gareth Saunders

- Hampshire won the toss and elected to field.

2 May 2022
11:00 BST
Scorecard

Kent; 90/7 (20 overs)	v	Sussex; 95/2 (13.5 overs)
Grace Scrivens 30 (32); Paige Scholfield 3/14 (4 overs)		Ella McCaughan 52* (47); Sydney Gorham 1/16 (3 overs)

Sussex won by 8 wickets
Brighton Aldridge Community Academy Ground, Brighton
Umpires: Fiona Richards and Julia Jarvis

- Sussex won the toss and elected to field.

2 May 2022
15:00 BST
Scorecard

Hampshire; 130/5 (20 overs)	v	Surrey; 128/2 (20 overs)
Charlotte Taylor 37* (29); Charlotte Lambert 2/27 (4 overs)		Amy Gordon 54 (56); Gemma Lane 1/8 (3 overs)

Hampshire won by 2 runs
Chipstead Coulsdon & Walcountians CC, Chipstead
Umpires: Mel Juniper and Gareth Saunders

2 May 2022
15:00 BST
Scorecard

Kent; 145/7 (20 overs)	v	Sussex; 149/3 (19 overs)
Grace Scrivens 82 (62); Chiara Green 2/21 (4 overs)		Paige Scholfield 47 (27); Kalea Moore 1/38 (4 overs)

Sussex won by 7 wickets
Brighton Aldridge Community Academy Ground, Brighton
Umpires: Fiona Richards and Julia Jarvis

- Sussex won the toss and elected to field.

==== Finals Day ====
Semi-Final
8 May 2022
10:30 BST
Scorecard

Sussex; 170/5 (20 overs)	v	Surrey; 100 (17.4 overs)
Georgia Adams 57 (36); Alice Capsey 2/26 (4 overs)		Madeleine Blinkhorn-Jones 19 (21); Freya Kemp 2/11 (3 overs)

Sussex won by 70 runs
Totting & Eling CC, Totton
Umpires: Nick Lewis and Yolande Harris

- Surrey won the toss and elected to field.

Semi-Final
8 May 2022
13:30 BST
Scorecard

Hampshire; 118/8 (20 overs)	v	Kent; 122/1 (19 overs)
Maia Bouchier 35 (21); Ryana MacDonald-Gay 4/19 (4 overs)		Grace Scrivens 59* (57); Gemma Porter 1/16 (4 overs)

Kent won by 9 wickets
Totting & Eling CC, Totton

- Hampshire won the toss and elected to bat.

Final
8 May 2022
16:30 BST
Scorecard

Kent; 135/6 (20 overs)	v	Sussex; 139/6 (19.2 overs)
Grace Scrivens 59 (53); Nancy Harman 3/22 (4 overs)		Nancy Harman 41* (33); Kalea Moore 3/30 (3.2 overs)

Sussex won by 4 wickets
Totting & Eling CC, Totton

- Kent won the toss and elected to bat.

=== Group 7 ===
==== Group stage ====
18 April 2022
11:00 BST
Scorecard

Buckinghamshire; 120/5 (20 overs)	v	Hertfordshire; 123/5 (18.3 overs)
Tegan Stockdale 27 (29); Ella Phillips 1/12 (4 overs)		Kezia Hassall 58* (56); Bethan Miles 2/13 (4 overs)

Hertfordshire won by 5 wickets
High Wycombe Cricket Club, High Wycombe

- Buckinghamshire won the toss and elected to bat.

18 April 2022
11:00 BST
Scorecard

Middlesex; 175/3 (20 overs)	v	Huntingdonshire; 28 (14 overs)
Natasha Miles 65 (45); Emily Banks 2/28 (4 overs)		Abigail Butcher 6 (14); Katie Green 3/4 (2 overs)

Middlesex won by 147 runs
Ramsey CC, Ramsey

- Huntingdonshire won the toss and elected to field.

18 April 2022
15:00 BST
Scorecard

Buckinghamshire; 102/9 (20 overs)	v	Hertfordshire; 106/5 (17.2 overs)
Megs Woodward 41 (26); Catherine Cirkel 3/16 (4 overs)		Ella Phillips 30 (26); Bethan Miles 2/8 (4 overs)

Hertfordshire won by 5 wickets
High Wycombe Cricket Club, High Wycombe

- Hertfordshire won the toss and elected to field.

18 April 2022
15:00 BST
Scorecard

Middlesex; 234/3 (20 overs)	v	Huntingdonshire; 52/5 (20 overs)
Isabella Routledge 70 (43); Ellie Burgess 2/21 (2 overs)		Annie Banks 14* (60); Kate Coppack 2/9 (4 overs)

Middlesex won by 182 runs
Ramsey CC, Ramsey

- Middlesex won the toss and elected to bat.

24 April 2022
11:00 BST
Scorecard

Hertfordshire; 174/2 (20 overs)	v	Huntingdonshire; 45/8 (20 overs)
Kezia Hassall 77* (68); Lottie Taylor 1/29 (4 overs)		Hannah Glister 9* (25); Ella Phillips 2/9 (4 overs)

Hertfordshire won by 129 runs
Harlow CC, Harlow
Umpires: Rose Dovey and Tracey Murphy

- Huntingdonshire won the toss and elected to field.

24 April 2022
11:00 BST
Scorecard

Buckinghamshire; 84/8 (20 overs)	v	Middlesex; 85/4 (11.3 overs)
Amber Drewe 24 (25); Emily Thorpe 3/12 (4 overs)		Naomi Dattani 31* (24); Hannah Davis 2/26 (3.3 overs)

Middlesex won by 6 wickets
Mill Hill School, Mill Hill, London
Umpires: Lizzy Condor and Shaz Khan

- Middlesex won the toss and elected to field.

24 April 2022
15:00 BST
Scorecard

Hertfordshire; 174/5 (20 overs)	v	Huntingdonshire; 45/8 (20 overs)
Catherine Cirkel 50 (31); Faith Teekasingh 2/26 (4 overs)		Annabelle Woodward 22* (54); Amelia Kemp 3/6 (4 overs)

Hertfordshire won by 129 runs
Harlow CC, Harlow
Umpires: Rose Dovey and Tracey Murphy

- Hertfordshire won the toss and elected to bat.

24 April 2022
15:00 BST
Scorecard

Middlesex; 162/6 (20 overs)	v	Buckinghamshire; 92/6 (20 overs)
Naomi Dattani 71 (55); Megan Woodward 2/18 (3 overs)		Ella Claridge 48 (44); Gemma Marriott 3/10 (4 overs)

Middlesex won by 70 runs
Mill Hill School, Mill Hill, London
Umpires: Lizzy Condor and Shaz Khan

- Buckinghamshire won the toss and elected to field.

2 May 2022
11:00 BST
Scorecard

Buckinghamshire; 174/6 (20 overs)	v	Huntingdonshire; 95/2 (20 overs)
Ella Claridge 96 (61); Faith Teekasingh 2/18 (4 overs)		Abigail Butcher 30* (31); Bella Mason 1/9 (4 overs)

Buckinghamshire won by 79 runs
Ramsey CC, Ramsey

- Huntingdonshire won the toss and elected to field.

2 May 2022
11:00 BST
Scorecard

Middlesex; 151/2 (20 overs)	v	Hertfordshire; 96/8 (20 overs)
Naomi Dattani 54* (43); Ella Phillips 1/15 (4 overs)		Kezia Hassall 33* (50); Gemma Marriott 3/13 (4 overs)

Middlesex won by 55 runs
Mill Hill School, Mill Hill, London

- Hertfordshire won the toss and elected to field.

2 May 2022
15:00 BST
Scorecard

Huntingdonshire; 99/6 (20 overs)	v	Buckinghamshire; 87 (18.2 overs)
Annie Banks 22 (31); Cara Duggan 3/27 (4 overs)		Rosie Lloyd 23 (46); Annabelle Woodward 2/11 (3 overs)

Huntingdonshire won by 12 runs
Ramsey CC, Ramsey

- Huntingdonshire won the toss and elected to bat.

2 May 2022
15:00 BST
Scorecard

Hertfordshire; 86/8 (20 overs)	v	Middlesex; 87/1 (10.2 overs)
Lydia Borbas 24 (32); Bhavika Gajipra 2/17 (4 overs)		Gemma Marriott 44* (29); Amelia Kemp 1/15 (2 overs)

Middlesex won by 9 wickets
Mill Hill School, Mill Hill, London

- Hertfordshire won the toss and elected to bat.

==== Finals Day ====
Note: Huntingdonshire withdrew from the Group 7 Finals Day, meaning that the three remaining teams played each other once on Finals Day.

8 May 2022
10:30 BST
Scorecard

Buckinghamshire; 69/6 (20 overs)	v	Middlesex; 70/0 (10 overs)
Amber Drewe 21 (42); Kate Coppack 2/7 (4 overs)		Cordelia Griffith 37* (33)

Middlesex won by 10 wickets
Campbell Park Cricket Ground, Milton Keynes

- Middlesex won the toss and elected to field.

8 May 2022
13:30 BST
Scorecard

Hertfordshire; 56/8 (20 overs)	v	Middlesex; 57/1 (6.3 overs)
Elsa Barnfather 11 (21); Saskia Horley 3/4 (3 overs)		Cordelia Griffith 23* (20); Rebecca Tyson 1/22 (3 overs)

Middlesex won by 9 wickets
Campbell Park Cricket Ground, Milton Keynes

- Middlesex won the toss and elected to field.

8 May 2022
16:30 BST
Scorecard

Buckinghamshire; 72 (18.3 overs)	v	Hertfordshire; 75/2 (12.5 overs)
Molly Carter 11 (24); Charley Phillips 4/10 (3.3 overs)		Rebecca Tyson 39* (45); Alissa Shannon 1/14 (2 overs)

Hertfordshire won by 8 wickets
Campbell Park Cricket Ground, Milton Keynes

- Buckinghamshire won the toss and elected to bat.

=== Group 8 ===
==== Group stage ====
18 April 2022
11:00 BST
Scorecard

Dorset; 67/9 (20 overs)	v	Devon; 56/1 (8 overs)
Victoria Pack 26 (38); Ellie Bishop 3/14 (4 overs)		Amelie Munday 28 (23)

Devon won by 9 wickets (DLS)
Heathcoat CC, Bolham
Umpires: Marilyn MacQueen and Ben Peverall

- Devon won the toss and elected to field.
- Devon target revised to 51 from 15 overs due to rain.

18 April 2022
11:00 BST
Scorecard

Cornwall; 115/8 (20 overs)	v	Wiltshire; 116/3 (20 overs)
Caitlin Burnett 30 (36); Emily Smith 4/13 (4 overs)		Emily Bogg 41 (45); Robyn Edge 2/15 (3 overs)

Wiltshire won by 7 wickets
Warminster CC, Warminster
Umpires: Rocky Riccalton and Lee Boutillier

- Wiltshire won the toss and elected to field.

18 April 2022
15:00 BST
Scorecard

Devon; 104/4 (20 overs)	v	Dorset; 77 (18.1 overs)
Claire Varcoe 38 (51); Tilly Churchill 2/15 (3 overs)		Mamta Kothiyal 19 (28); Sophie Florides 1/10 (3 overs)

Devon won by 27 runs
Heathcoat CC, Bolham
Umpires: Marilyn MacQueen and Ben Peverall

- Dorset won the toss and elected to field.

18 April 2022
15:00 BST
Scorecard

Wiltshire; 94/7 (20 overs)	v	Cornwall; 95/7 (19.2 overs)
Lauren Shrubsole 41 (55); Robyn Edge 2/14 (4 overs)		Robyn Edge 31 (32); Jenny Heppell 2/5 (3.2 overs)

Cornwall won by 3 wickets
Warminster CC, Warminster
Umpires: Rocky Riccalton and Lee Boutillier

- Wiltshire won the toss and elected to bat.

24 April 2022
11:00 BST
Scorecard

Cornwall; 97/1 (16 overs)	v	Devon
Robyn Edge 62 (61); Steph Hutchins 1/9 (3 overs)

No Result
Wadebridge CC, Wadebridge

- Devon won the toss and elected to field.
- No further play possible due to rain.

24 April 2022
11:00 BST
Scorecard

Wiltshire; 108/3 (20 overs)	v	Dorset; 98/7 (20 overs)
Isla Thomson 62* (53); Katie Harris 2/9 (4 overs)		Mamta Kothiyal 33 (37); Katie Sell 2/8 (3 overs)

Wiltshire won by 10 runs
Kilmington & Stourton CC, Kilmington

- Dorset won the toss and elected to field.

24 April 2022
15:00 BST
Scorecard

Devon; 138/2 (20 overs)	v	Cornwall; 97/9 (20 overs)
Amelie Munday 75* (69); Kellie Williams 1/19 (4 overs)		Caitlin Burnett 30 (29); Erin Vukusic 3/8 (3 overs)

Devon won by 41 runs
Wadebridge CC, Wadebridge

- Devon won the toss and elected to bat.

24 April 2022
15:00 BST
Scorecard

Wiltshire; 86 (18.5 overs)	v	Dorset; 87/3 (15.3 overs)
Isla Thomson 27 (29); Emily Roberts 3/10 (2 overs)		Victoria Pack 42* (43); Holly Evans 2/10 (3 overs)

Dorset won by 7 wickets
Kilmington & Stourton CC, Kilmington

- Dorset won the toss and elected to field.

2 May 2022
11:00 BST
Scorecard

Dorset; 92/3 (20 overs)	v	Cornwall; 93/2 (12.3 overs)
Kirah Ambrozick 23 (47); Lucie Oakley 1/15 (3 overs)		Bernadette Forge 40 (37); Amelie Whitaker 2/8 (2 overs)

Cornwall won by 8 wickets
Dorchester CC, Dorchester

- Cornwall won the toss and elected to field.

2 May 2022
11:00 BST
Scorecard

Wiltshire; 90/7 (20 overs)	v	Devon; 93/4 (18 overs)
Isla Thomson 30 (31); Eva Lewis 3/12 (4 overs)		Steph Hutchins 30 (41); Emily Smith 2/10 (4 overs)

Devon won by 6 wickets
Chippenham CC, Chippenham

- Devon won the toss and elected to field.

2 May 2022
15:00 BST
Scorecard

Cornwall; 102/1 (12 overs)	v	Dorset; 95/4 (12 overs)
Robyn Edge 66* (42); Matilda Churchill 1/18 (2 overs)		Victoria Pack 35 (21); Lucie Oakley 2/9 (2 overs)

Cornwall won by 11 runs (DLS)
Dorchester CC, Dorchester

- Cornwall won the toss and elected to bat.
- Match reduced to 12 overs per side.
- Dorset revised target was 107 runs from 12 overs.

2 May 2022
15:00 BST
Scorecard

Wiltshire; 82/7 (20 overs)	v	Devon; 83/7 (19 overs)
Lauren Shrubsole 25 (37); Ellie Bishop 3/9 (4 overs)		Steph Hutchins 19 (13); Emily Otton 2/12 (2 overs)

Devon won by 3 wickets
Chippenham CC, Chippenham

- Devon won the toss and elected to field.

==== Finals Day ====
Semi-Final
8 May 2022
10:30 BST
Scorecard

Dorset; 62 (19.1 overs)	v	Devon; 65/3 (10.5 overs)
Mamta Kothiyal 21 (22); Katie Donovan 2/6 (4 overs)		Claire Varcoe 34 (19); Katie Harris 2/15 (4 overs)

Devon won by 7 wickets
Heathcoat CC, Bolham

- Devon won the toss and elected to field.

Semi-Final
8 May 2022
13:30 BST
Scorecard

Cornwall; 136/4 (20 overs)	v	Wiltshire; 109/5 (20 overs)
Bernadette Forge 42 (42); Emily Smith 1/15 (3 overs)		Victoria Stone 41* (62); Lucie Oakley 3/14 (4 overs)

Cornwall won by 27 runs
Heathcoat CC, Bolham

- Wiltshire won the toss and elected to field.

Final
8 May 2022
16:30 BST
Scorecard

Devon; 109/9 (20 overs)	v	Cornwall; 98 (19.4 overs)
Erin Vukusic 37 (38); Kellie Williams 2/13 (4 overs)		Bernadette Forge 35 (39); Eva Lewis 4/9 (4 overs)

Devon won by 11 runs
Heathcoat CC, Bolham

- Cornwall won the toss and elected to field.

== Statistics ==
=== Most runs ===
Player	Team	Matches	Innings	Runs	Average	HS	100s	50s
Georgie Boyce	Lancashire	8	8	306	76.50	79*	0	3
Georgina Macey	Worcestershire	8	8	295	36.88	70	0	3
Grace Scrivens	Kent	6	6	265	53.00	88	0	3
Davina Perrin	Staffordshire	8	7	242	34.57	87	0	2
Sophie Luff	Somerset	8	7	239	39.83	56	0	2

Source: Play-Cricket

=== Most wickets ===
Player	Team	Overs	Wickets	Average	BBI	5w
Anisha Patel	Warwickshire	26.5	15	8.27	4/7	0
Chloe Westbury	Oxfordshire	23.0	13	6.08	3/9	0
Alex Hartley	Lancashire	31.1	13	8.15	4/5	0
Phoebe Graham	Lancashire	30.4	13	10.00	3/8	0
Georgia Davis	Warwickshire	32.0	13	11.31	5/14	1

Source: Play-Cricket
