= 2020 North West Thunder season =

English women's domestic cricket

North West Thunder
2020 season
- Coach: Paul Shaw
- Captain: Alex Hartley
- RHFT: North Group, 3rd
- Most runs: Natalie Brown (189)
- Most wickets: Alex Hartley (11)
- Most catches: Alex Hartley (3); Natalie Brown (3)
- Most wicket-keeping dismissals: Eleanor Threlkeld (5)

The 2020 season was North West Thunder's first season, in which they competed in the 50 over Rachael Heyhoe Flint Trophy following reforms to the structure of women's domestic cricket in England. The side finished third in the North Group of the competition, winning two of their six matches.

After the ending of the Women's Cricket Super League in 2019, the ECB announced the beginning of a new "women's elite domestic structure". Eight teams were included in this new structure, with North West Thunder being one of the new teams, replacing Lancashire Thunder and representing North West England. Due to the impact of the COVID-19 pandemic, only the Rachael Heyhoe Flint Trophy was able to take place. North West Thunder were captained by Alex Hartley and coached by Paul Shaw. They played their home matches at Aigburth Cricket Ground, Liverpool.

== Squad ==
North West Thunder's squad for the season is listed below. Age given is at the start of North West Thunder's first match of the season (29 August 2020).

Name	Nationality	Birth date	Batting style	Bowling style	Notes
Batters
Georgie Boyce	England	4 October 1998 (aged 21)	Right-handed	Right-arm medium	
Danielle Collins	England	7 July 2000 (aged 20)	Left-handed	Right-arm medium	
Rebecca Duckworth	England	30 October 2000 (aged 19)	Right-handed	Right-arm medium	
Laura Marshall	England	1 November 1993 (aged 26)	Right-handed	Right-arm medium	
All-rounders
Natalie Brown	England	16 October 1990 (aged 29)	Right-handed	Right-arm medium	
Laura Jackson	England	27 December 1997 (aged 22)	Right-handed	Right-arm medium	
Daisy Mullan	England	29 November 2002 (aged 17)	Right-handed	Right-arm medium	
Emma Lamb	England	16 December 1997 (aged 22)	Right-handed	Right-arm off break	
Wicket-keepers
Eleanor Threlkeld	England	16 November 1998 (aged 21)	Right-handed	—	
Alice Clarke	England	4 August 2001 (aged 19)	Left-handed	Right-arm medium	
Bowlers
Sophie Ecclestone	England	6 May 1999 (aged 21)	Right-handed	Slow left-arm orthodox	
Kate Cross	England	3 October 1991 (aged 28)	Right-handed	Right-arm medium-fast	
Alice Dyson	England	28 January 1999 (aged 21)	Right-handed	Right-arm medium	
Alex Hartley	England	6 September 1993 (aged 26)	Right-handed	Slow left-arm orthodox	Captain
Liberty Heap	England	16 September 2003 (aged 16)	Right-handed	Right-arm off break	
Hannah Jones	England	10 February 1999 (aged 21)	Left-handed	Slow left-arm orthodox	
Olivia Thomas	England	3 May 2004 (aged 16)	Right-handed	Right-arm leg break	
Sophia Turner	England	23 April 2003 (aged 17)	Right-handed	Right-arm medium	

== Rachael Heyhoe Flint Trophy ==
=== North Group ===
Pos	Team	Pld	W	L	T	NR	BP	Pts	NRR
1	Northern Diamonds	6	5	1	0	0	3	23	1.000
2	Central Sparks	6	3	3	0	0	1	13	−0.285
3	North West Thunder	6	2	4	0	0	1	9	−0.515
4	Lightning	6	2	4	0	0	0	8	−0.113

Source: ESPN Cricinfo

=== Fixtures ===
29 August 2020
10:30 BST
Scorecard

North West Thunder; 206/9 (50 overs)	v	Lightning; 146 (35.5 overs)
Sophie Ecclestone 60* (61); Sophie Munro 3/32 (9 overs)		Sarah Bryce 52 (69); Sophie Ecclestone 2/29 (7.5 overs)

North West Thunder won by 4 runs (DLS)
Trent Bridge, Nottingham
Umpires: Joanne Ibbotson and Ian Ramage

- North West Thunder won the toss and elected to bat.
- Lightning were set a revised target of 151 runs from 36 overs due to rain.
- Points: North West Thunder 4, Lightning 0

31 August 2020
10:30 BST
Scorecard

North West Thunder; 135 (46.1 overs)	v	Central Sparks; 136/6 (44 overs)
Kate Cross 45 (73); Issy Wong 3/26 (10 overs)		Marie Kelly 59* (99); Sophie Ecclestone 2/13 (10 overs)

Central Sparks won by 4 wickets
Edgbaston, Birmingham
Umpires: Malinda Underdown and Sue Redfern

- North West Thunder won the toss and elected to bat.
- Points: Central Sparks 4, North West Thunder 0

5 September 2020
10:30 BST
Scorecard

North West Thunder; 166/8 (50 overs)	v	Central Sparks; 167/2 (38.1 overs)
Natalie Brown 27 (47); Clare Boycott 4/40 (10 overs)		Evelyn Jones 90 (113); Olivia Thomas 1/29 (4 overs)

Central Sparks won by 8 wickets
New Road, Worcester
Umpires: Malinda Underdown and Jeremy Lloyds

- North West Thunder won the toss and elected to bat.
- Points: Central Sparks 5, North West Thunder 0

10 September 2020
10:30 BST
Scorecard

Northern Diamonds; 248/8 (50 overs)	v	North West Thunder; 175/8 (50 overs)
Alex MacDonald 92 (110); Laura Jackson 2/23 (9 overs)		Alice Dyson 25* (51); Katie Levick 3/22 (10 overs)

Northern Diamonds won by 73 runs
Aigburth Cricket Ground, Liverpool
Umpires: Jasmine Naeem and Steve O'Shaughnessy

- North West Thunder won the toss and elected to field.
- Points: Northern Diamonds 5, North West Thunder 0

13 September 2020
10:30 BST
Scorecard

North West Thunder; 188/9 (50 overs)	v	Lightning; 116 (39.1 overs)
Natalie Brown 52 (82); Kathryn Bryce 4/38 (10 overs)		Abigail Freeborn 28 (67); Alex Hartley 4/8 (10 overs)

North West Thunder won by 72 runs
Aigburth Cricket Ground, Liverpool
Umpires: Jasmine Naeem and Tom Lungley

- North West Thunder won the toss and elected to bat.
- Points: North West Thunder 5, Lightning 0

19 September 2020
10:30 BST
Scorecard

North West Thunder; 143 (42.5 overs)	v	Northern Diamonds; 144/4 (29.4 overs)
Natalie Brown 32 (41); Beth Langston 3/18 (8.5 overs)		Sterre Kalis 55* (67); Hannah Jones 1/28 (8 overs)

Northern Diamonds won by 6 wickets
Headingley, Leeds
Umpires: Joanne Ibbotson and Ian Ramage

- North West Thunder won the toss and elected to bat.
- Points: Northern Diamonds 5, North West Thunder 0

== Statistics ==
=== Batting ===
Player	Matches	Innings	NO	Runs	HS	Average	Strike rate	100s	50s	4s	6s
Georgie Boyce	6	6	0	105	31	17.50	51.98	0	0	14	0
Natalie Brown	6	6	0	189	52	31.50	68.72	0	1	25	0
Alice Clarke	1	1	0	1	1	1.00	20.00	0	0	0	0
Danielle Collins	3	3	0	27	18	9.00	40.90	0	0	2	0
Kate Cross	2	2	0	53	45	26.50	54.08	0	0	4	0
Rebecca Duckworth	4	4	1	66	27	22.00	34.55	0	0	2	0
Alice Dyson	4	4	1	52	25*	17.33	50.48	0	0	5	0
Sophie Ecclestone	2	2	1	74	60*	74.00	90.24	0	1	8	2
Alex Hartley	6	6	4	23	14*	11.50	63.88	0	0	1	0
Liberty Heap	4	4	0	28	15	7.00	45.16	0	0	4	0
Laura Jackson	3	3	0	23	22	7.66	19.16	0	0	1	0
Hannah Jones	6	4	2	9	4*	4.50	36.00	0	0	0	0
Emma Lamb	2	2	0	9	6	4.50	24.32	0	0	1	0
Laura Marshall	6	6	0	61	25	10.16	48.80	0	0	10	0
Olivia Thomas	3	3	1	17	16*	8.50	0	0	1	0	
Eleanor Threlkeld	6	6	0	114	52	19.00	57.28	0	1	12	0
Sophia Turner	2	2	0	3	2	1.50	11.53	0	0	0	0
Source: ESPN Cricinfo

=== Bowling ===
Player	Matches	Innings	Overs	Maidens	Runs	Wickets	BBI	Average	Economy	Strike rate
Georgie Boyce	6	1	1.0	0	10	0	–	–	10.00	–
Natalie Brown	6	6	41.4	3	203	4	1/18	50.75	4.87	62.5
Kate Cross	2	2	17.0	2	76	2	1/26	38.00	4.47	51.0
Alice Dyson	4	4	19.0	1	106	2	2/38	53.00	5.57	57.0
Sophie Ecclestone	2	2	17.5	3	42	4	2/13	10.50	2.35	26.7
Alex Hartley	6	6	54.0	6	170	11	4/8	14.45	3.14	
Liberty Heap	4	3	19.0	1	91	5	3/34	18.20	4.78	22.8
Laura Jackson	3	2	16.0	1	43	2	2/23	21.50	2.68	48.0
Hannah Jones	6	6	41.2	5	131	4	2/20	32.75	3.16	62.0
Emma Lamb	2	2	6.0	0	32	0	–	–	5.33	–
Olivia Thomas	3	1	4.0	0	29	1	1/29	29.00	7.25	24.0
Source: ESPN Cricinfo

=== Fielding ===
Player	Matches	Innings	Catches
Georgie Boyce	6	6	0
Natalie Brown	6	6	3
Alice Clarke	1	1	0
Danielle Collins	3	3	0
Kate Cross	2	2	0
Rebecca Duckworth	4	4	0
Alice Dyson	4	4	0
Sophie Ecclestone	2	2	1
Alex Hartley	6	6	3
Liberty Heap	4	4	1
Laura Jackson	3	3	0
Hannah Jones	6	6	0
Emma Lamb	2	2	0
Laura Marshall	6	6	0
Olivia Thomas	3	3	1
Sophia Turner	2	2	0
Source: ESPN Cricinfo

=== Wicket-keeping ===
Player	Matches	Innings	Catches	Stumpings
Eleanor Threlkeld	6	6	1	4
Source: ESPN Cricinfo
