= 2020 Western Storm season =

English cricket season

Western Storm
2020 season
- Coach: Mark O'Leary
- Captain: Sophie Luff
- RHFT: South Group, 2nd
- Most runs: Sophie Luff (339)
- Most wickets: Fi Morris (11); Georgia Hennessy (11)
- Most catches: Sophie Luff (4)
- Most wicket-keeping dismissals: Nat Wraith (5)

The 2020 season saw Western Storm compete in the new 50 over Rachael Heyhoe Flint Trophy following reforms to the structure of women's domestic cricket in England. The side finished second in the South Group of the competition, winning 4 of their 6 games, failing to progress to the final.

After the ending of the Women's Cricket Super League in 2019, the ECB announced the beginning of a new "women's elite domestic structure". Eight teams were included in this new structure, with Western Storm being one of two teams that had their brand retained as a domestic regional hub. Due to the impact of the COVID-19 pandemic, only the Rachael Heyhoe Flint Trophy was able to take place. Western Storm were captained by Sophie Luff and coached by Mark O'Leary, and played all of their home matches at the County Ground, Bristol.

== Squad ==
Western Storm confirmed their full 17-player squad for the season on 28 August 2020. Age given is at the start of Western Storm's first match of the season (29 August 2020).

Name	Nationality	Birth date	Batting Style	Bowling Style	Notes
Batters
Sophie Luff	England	6 December 1993 (aged 26)	Right-handed	Right-arm medium	Captain
Lauren Parfitt	Wales	1 April 1994 (aged 26)	Right-handed	Left-arm medium	
All-rounders
Emma Corney	England	15 September 2003 (aged 16)	Right-handed	Right-arm medium	
Olivia Churcher	England	Unknown	Right-handed	Right-arm medium	
Katie George	England	7 April 1999 (aged 21)	Right-handed	Left-arm medium	
Danielle Gibson	England	30 April 2001 (aged 19)	Right-handed	Right-arm medium	
Alex Griffiths	Wales	12 June 2002 (aged 18)	Right-handed	Right-arm medium	
Georgia Hennessy	England	4 November 1996 (aged 23)	Right-handed	Right-arm medium	
Niamh Holland	England	27 October 2004 (aged 15)	Right-handed	Right-arm medium	
Heather Knight	England	26 December 1990 (aged 29)	Right-handed	Right-arm off break	
Fi Morris	England	31 January 1994 (aged 26)	Right-handed	Right-arm off break	
Wicket-keepers
Abbie Whybrow	England	13 June 2002 (aged 18)	Right-handed	—	
Nat Wraith	England	3 October 2001 (aged 18)	Right-handed	—	
Bowlers
Emily Edgcombe	England	5 August 2001 (aged 19)	Right-handed	Left-arm medium	
Lauren Filer	England	28 April 1994 (aged 26)	Right-handed	Right-arm medium	
Steph Hutchins	England	6 October 1998 (aged 21)	Right-handed	Right-arm off spin	
Claire Nicholas	Wales	8 September 1986 (aged 33)	Right-handed	Right-arm off break	
Anya Shrubsole	England	7 December 1991 (aged 28)	Right-handed	Right-arm medium	

== Rachael Heyhoe Flint Trophy ==
=== South Group ===
Pos	Team	Pld	W	L	T	NR	BP	Pts	NRR
1	Southern Vipers	6	6	0	0	0	3	27	1.017
2	Western Storm	6	4	2	0	0	2	18	0.510
3	South East Stars	6	2	4	0	0	2	10	−0.197
4	Sunrisers	6	0	6	0	0	0	0	−1.365

Source: ESPN Cricinfo

Advanced to the Final.

=== Fixtures ===
29 August 2020
10:30 BST
Scorecard

South East Stars; 166 (48.1 overs)	v	Western Storm; 167/4 (39.5 overs)
Susie Rowe 38 (44); Georgia Hennessy 4/31 (8.1 overs)		Heather Knight 91* (99); Bryony Smith 1/11 (4 overs)

Western Storm won by 6 wickets
Kent County Cricket Ground, Beckenham
Umpires: Sarah Bartlett and Nigel Llong

- Western Storm won the toss and elected to field.
- Points: Western Storm 5, South East Stars 0

31 August 2020
10:30 BST
Scorecard

Southern Vipers; 261/7 (50 overs)	v	Western Storm; 239 (47.5 overs)
Charlie Dean 60* (70); Heather Knight 2/36 (10 overs)		Heather Knight 67 (80); Tara Norris 4/45 (8 overs)

Southern Vipers won by 22 runs
County Ground, Bristol
Umpires: Jeremy Lloyds and Yvonne Dolphin-Cooper

- Western Storm won the toss and elected to field.
- Points: Southern Vipers 4, Western Storm 0

5 September 2020
10:30 BST
Scorecard

Western Storm; 265/6 (50 overs)	v	Sunrisers; 179 (45 overs)
Sophie Luff 85 (115); Alice Macleod 1/34 (10 overs)		Jo Gardner 54 (76); Fi Morris 5/26 (10 overs)

Western Storm won by 86 runs
County Cricket Ground, Chelmsford
Umpires: Nigel Llong and Nigel Cowley

- Sunrisers won the toss and elected to field.
- Points: Western Storm 5, Sunrisers 0

11 September 2020
10:30 BST
Scorecard

South East Stars; 212/9 (50 overs)	v	Western Storm; 215/3 (46.1 overs)
Kirstie White 50 (77); Georgia Hennessy 3/40 (10 overs)		Sophie Luff 104* 104 (133); Tash Farrant 1/28 (7 overs)

Western Storm won by 7 wickets
County Ground, Bristol
Umpires: Fiona Richards and Mark Newell

- South East Stars won the toss and elected to bat.
- Points: Western Storm 4, South East Stars 0

13 September 2020
10:30 BST
Scorecard

Southern Vipers; 288/1 (50 overs)	v	Western Storm; 256 (50 overs)
Georgia Adams 154* (155); Fi Morris 1/49 (10 overs)		Sophie Luff 79 (88); Charlotte Taylor 4/41 (10 overs)

Southern Vipers won by 32 runs
Rose Bowl, Southampton
Umpires: Mark Newell and Sarah Bartlett

- Southern Vipers won the toss and elected to bat.
- Points: Southern Vipers 4, Western Storm 0

19 September 2020
10:30 BST
Scorecard

Western Storm; 288/6 (50 overs)	v	Sunrisers; 241 (49 overs)
Georgia Hennessy 105 (110); Katie Wolfe 2/34 (10 overs)		Grace Scrivens 72 (73); Georgia Hennessy 2/29 (6 overs)

Western Storm won by 47 runs
County Ground, Bristol
Umpires: Mark Newell and Yvonne Dolphin-Cooper

- Sunrisers won the toss and elected to field.
- Points: Western Storm 4, Sunrisers 0

== Statistics ==
=== Batting ===
Player	Matches	Innings	NO	Runs	HS	Average	Strike rate	100s	50s	4s	6s
Emma Corney	6	3	1	21	12	10.50	67.74	0	0	1	0
Emily Edgcombe	3	2	1	11	10	11.00	91.66	0	0	1	0
Lauren Filer	3	1	1	3	3*	–	60.00	0	0	0	0
Katie George	2	2	1	19	19*	19.00	73.077	0	0	3	0
Danielle Gibson	1	1	1	33	33*	–	137.50	0	0	5	0
Alex Griffiths	6	4	0	141	80	35.25	118.48	0	1	18	2
Georgia Hennessy	6	6	0	209	105	34.83	80.07	1	1	28	0
Niamh Holland	6	2	0	8	8	4.00	57.14	0	0	0	0
Steph Hutchins	4	1	0	4	4	4.00	40.00	0	0	0	0
Heather Knight	2	2	1	158	91*	158.00	88.26	0	2	17	0
Sophie Luff	6	6	1	339	104*	67.80	75.50	1	3	32	2
Fi Morris	6	6	0	115	33	19.16	62.16	0	0	14	0
Claire Nicholas	3	2	1	46	24*	46.00	67.78	0	0	5	0
Lauren Parfitt	5	5	1	89	33*	22.25	58.94	0	0	12	0
Anya Shrubsole	1	–	–	–	–	–	–	–	–	–	–
Nat Wraith	6	6	1	111	68	22.20	60.98	0	1	12	0
Source: ESPN Cricinfo

=== Bowling ===
Player	Matches	Innings	Overs	Maidens	Runs	Wickets	BBI	Average	Economy	Strike rate
Emma Corney	6	4	20.0	0	88	2	1/16	44.00	4.40	60.0
Emily Edgcombe	3	2	14.0	2	71	1	1/39	71.00	5.07	84.0
Lauren Filer	3	3	11.0	1	70	3	2/24	23.33	6.36	22.0
Katie George	2	2	16.0	0	58	2	1/15	29.00	3.62	48.0
Alex Griffiths	6	6	36.0	3	189	3	2/53	63.00	5.25	72.0
Georgia Hennessy	6	6	53.1	2	257	11	4/31	23.36	4.83	29.0
Niamh Holland	6	2	5.0	0	35	1	1/21	35.00	7.00	30.0
Steph Hutchins	4	4	31.0	4	130	3	1/26	43.33	4.19	62.0
Heather Knight	2	1	10.0	1	36	2	2/36	18.00	3.60	30.0
Sophie Luff	6	1	4.0	0	27	1	1/27	27.00	6.75	24.0
Fi Morris	6	6	59.0	4	240	11	5/26	21.81	4.06	32.1
Claire Nicholas	3	3	24.0	0	89	2	1/31	44.50	3.70	72.0
Anya Shrubsole	1	1	9.0	1	31	0	–	–	3.44	–
Source: ESPN Cricinfo

=== Fielding ===
Player	Matches	Innings	Catches
Emma Corney	6	6	3
Emily Edgcombe	3	3	1
Lauren Filer	3	3	0
Katie George	2	2	0
Danielle Gibson	1	1	0
Alex Griffiths	6	6	2
Georgia Hennessy	6	6	3
Niamh Holland	6	6	0
Steph Hutchins	4	4	1
Heather Knight	2	2	1
Sophie Luff	6	6	4
Fi Morris	6	6	2
Claire Nicholas	3	3	0
Lauren Parfitt	5	5	1
Anya Shrubsole	1	1	1
Source: ESPN Cricinfo

=== Wicket-keeping ===
Player	Matches	Innings	Catches	Stumpings
Nat Wraith	6	6	1	4
Source: ESPN Cricinfo
