= Katie Midwood =

English cricketer (born 1993)

Personal information
- Full name: Katie Louise Midwood
- Born: 1 October 1993 (age 33)
- Batting: Right-handed
- Bowling: Slow left-arm orthodox
- Role: All-rounder

Domestic team information
- Years: Team
- 2014–2019: Leicestershire
- 2017: → Worcestershire (on loan)
- 2020–2022: Essex
- 2020–2021: Sunrisers
- 2022: Lightning
- 2023–present: Leicestershire

Career statistics
Competition	WLA	WT20
Matches	47	44
Runs scored	695	693
Batting average	20.44	36.47
100s/50s	0/2	0/3
Top score	70*	63*
Balls bowled	894	504
Wickets	21	25
Bowling average	31.00	16.36
5 wickets in innings	0	0
10 wickets in match	0	0
Best bowling	3/5	4/7
Catches/stumpings	4/–	9/–
- Source: CricketArchive, 1 October 2021

Katie Louise Midwood (born 1 October 1993) is an English cricketer who currently plays for Leicestershire. An all-rounder, she is a right-handed batter and slow left-arm orthodox bowler. She has previously played for Worcestershire, Essex and Sunrisers.

== Domestic career ==
Midwood made her county debut in 2014, for Leicestershire against Hampshire. In her sixth match for the side, she achieved her List A high score, hitting 70* in a victory over Derbyshire. The following season, she was the side's leading run-scorer, with 235 runs at an average of 39.16, as Leicestershire were promoted to Division 2 of the County Championship. Midwood spent much of the 2017 season with Worcestershire as the side gained promotion in the Twenty20 Cup. Midwood returned to Leicestershire for the next two seasons, before moving to Essex ahead of the 2020 season, and made her debut for her new side in the 2021 Women's Twenty20 Cup. She played six matches in the tournament, scoring 33 runs and taking 4 wickets. In the 2022 Women's Twenty20 Cup, Midwood scored 157 runs and took eight wickets, including returning figures of 4/7 against Cambridgeshire. She re-joined Leicestershire ahead of the 2023 season.

In 2020, Midwood played for Sunrisers in the Rachael Heyhoe Flint Trophy. She appeared in five matches, scoring 57 runs at an average of 14.25 and taking 2 wickets. In 2021, it was announced that Midwood would also be taking on the role of Sports Science Consultant at Sunrisers. She played just one match for the side that season, against Lightning in the Rachael Heyhoe Flint Trophy, scoring 10* and bowling eight overs with figures of 1/42. Ahead of the 2022 season, Midwood joined Lightning, but did not play a match for the side that season.
