= Peter Graham (cricketer, born 1954) =

English cricketer

Personal information
- Full name: Peter Colin Graham
- Born: 25 December 1954; Newcastle upon Tyne, Northumberland
- Died: 17 April 2015 (aged 60); Menston, Yorkshire
- Batting: Right-handed
- Bowling: Right-arm fast-medium
- Relatives: Phoebe Graham (daughter); Norman Graham (cousin)

Domestic team information
- Years: Team
- 1976–1996: Northumberland

Career statistics
| Competition | FC | LA |
|---|---|---|
| Matches | 1 | 8 |
| Runs scored | 0 | 8 |
| Batting average | 0.00 | 2.66 |
| 100s/50s | 0/0 | 0/0 |
| Top score | 0 | 4* |
| Balls bowled | 177 | 492 |
| Wickets | 4 | 6 |
| Bowling average | 20.75 | 46.50 |
| 5 wickets in innings | 0 | 0 |
| 10 wickets in match | 0 | 0 |
| Best bowling | 2/39 | 2/28 |
| Catches/stumpings | 2/– | 2/– |
- Source: Cricinfo, 4 November 2010

Peter Colin Graham (25 December 1954 – 17 April 2015) was an English cricketer. Graham was a right-handed batsman who bowled right-arm fast-medium. He was born at Newcastle upon Tyne in Northumberland.

Graham was educated at Durham University. He made his debut for Northumberland County Cricket Club against the Lancashire Second XI in the 1976 Minor Counties Championship. From 1976 to 1996, he represented the county in 116 Championship matches, the last of which came against Cumberland. Graham also represented the county in the MCCA Knockout Trophy, making his debut for the county in 1985 against Durham. From 1985 to 1995, he represented the county in 14 Trophy matches, the last of which came against Suffolk.

It was while representing Northumberland that Graham made his debut in List A cricket for a Minor Counties team against Kent in the 1985 Benson & Hedges Cup. The following year he played his first List A match for Northumberland in the 1986 NatWest Trophy against Essex.

Graham played his only first-class cricket match in 1994 for the combined Minor Counties teams against the touring South Africans.

He later represented the Yorkshire Cricket Board in a single match against Buckinghamshire in the 1999 NatWest Trophy.

His cousin, Norman Graham, represented Kent and the Marylebone Cricket Club in first-class cricket, as well as Northumberland in List A and Minor Counties cricket. His daughter, Phoebe Graham, is a current cricketer.

== Later years ==
Graham went onto open a sports shop in Yeadon, Leeds. He died in 2015 at the age of 60 following an illness.
