= Layla Tipton =

English cricketer

Personal information
- Full name: Layla Tipton
- Born: 19 March 2002 (aged 18); Sunderland, County Durham, England
- Batting: Left-handed
- Bowling: Right-arm medium
- Role: All-rounder

Domestic team information
- Years: Team
- 2016–2019: Durham
- 2020–present: North East Warriors
- 2020: Northern Diamonds

Career statistics
Competition	WLA	WT20
Matches	14	37
Runs scored	210	420
Batting average	17.50	17.50
100s/50s	0/0	0/2
Top score	34	57*
Balls bowled	162	474
Wickets	3	15
Bowling average	46.33	26.46
5 wickets in innings	0	0
10 wickets in match	0	0
Best bowling	2/29	3/6
Catches/stumpings	3/–	5/–
- Source: CricketArchive, 23 October 2023

Layla Tipton (born 19 March 2002) is an English cricketer who currently plays for North East Warriors. An all-rounder, she is a left-handed batter and right-arm medium bowler. She has previously played for Durham and Northern Diamonds.

== Early life ==
Tipton was born on 19 March 2002 in Sunderland, County Durham.

== Domestic career ==
Tipton made her county debut in 2016, for Durham against Wales. Her most successful season came in 2018, when she hit 112 runs at an average of 22.40 in the County Championship and took 9 wickets at an average of 14.00 in the Twenty20 Cup.

In 2020, Durham merged with Northumberland to form the North East Warriors. Although the side did not play any competitive matches in 2020 due to the COVID-19 pandemic, Tipton did appear in two friendlies against Scotland for the team that year.

In 2020, Tipton played for Northern Diamonds in the Rachael Heyhoe Flint Trophy. She appeared in one match, scoring 14 runs and bowling two overs against Lightning.

In 2021, Tipton appeared for the North East Warriors in the Twenty20 Cup. She played seven matches as her side finished 5th in their group, with her best performance coming against North Representative XI, scoring 57*, her maiden county half-century. In the 2022 Women's Twenty20 Cup, she was both the leading run-scorer, with 162 runs, and joint-leading wicket-taker, with five wickets, for North East Warriors. She scored 51* from 36 deliveries against North Representative XI, and took 3/6 from 4 overs against Derbyshire. At the end of the 2022 season, Tipton was named in the Northern Diamonds Academy squad for the 2023 season.
