= Phoebe Graham =

English cricketer (born 1991)

Personal information
- Full name: Phoebe Claire Graham
- Born: 23 October 1991 (age 35); Steeton, West Yorkshire, England
- Batting: Right-handed
- Bowling: Right-arm medium
- Role: Bowler
- Relatives: Peter Graham (father)

Domestic team information
- Years: Team
- 2010: Nottinghamshire
- 2010–2013: Yorkshire
- 2014–2015: Devon
- 2018–2020: Berkshire
- 2020–2021: Northern Diamonds
- 2021: Yorkshire
- 2021: North Representative XI
- 2021: Northern Superchargers
- 2022–2025: Lancashire
- 2022–2024: North West Thunder
- 2023: → Western Storm (on loan)
- 2022–2025: Manchester Originals
- 2022/23: Northern Districts

Career statistics
Competition	WLA	WT20
Matches	72	76
Runs scored	251	207
Batting average	7.60	10.89
100s/50s	0/0	0/0
Top score	29*	26*
Balls bowled	2,312	1,342
Wickets	48	61
Bowling average	36.58	22.83
5 wickets in innings	0	0
10 wickets in match	0	0
Best bowling	3/14	3/8
Catches/stumpings	10/–	15/–
- Source: CricketArchive, 17 October 2024

Phoebe Claire Graham (born 23 October 1991) is an English former cricketer. A right-arm medium bowler, she played for Nottinghamshire, Devon, Berkshire, Yorkshire, North Representative XI, Northern Diamonds, North West Thunder, Western Storm, Northern Superchargers, Northern Districts, Lancashire and Manchester Originals.

== Early life ==
Graham was born on 23 October 1991 in Steeton, West Yorkshire. She attended Exeter University, and has worked in marketing. Her father, Peter, played cricket for Northumberland.

== Domestic career ==
Graham made her county debut in 2010, for Nottinghamshire against Sussex. She did not bowl and was out for a duck. She only played one more match for Nottinghamshire, however, and played the rest of the season for Yorkshire. She took five wickets at an average of 19.40 for the side in that season's Twenty20 Cup, and continued to be a regular until she moved to Devon ahead of the 2014 season.

Graham only remained at Devon for two seasons, and took a break from the game after her father died in 2015. She was "dragged back" to cricket after watching the 2017 World Cup Final, and subsequently began playing for Berkshire for the 2018 season. She had a successful return, especially in the 2018 Women's Twenty20 Cup, where she took 9 wickets at an average of 10.22. She continued this form into 2019, taking 12 wickets at an average of 18.66 in the County Championship. Ahead of the 2021 season, Graham returned to Yorkshire, and was subsequently named as part of the team's contingent in the North Representative XI squad for the Twenty20 Cup, and took two wickets in four matches for the side. In 2022, Graham joined Lancashire. She was the side's joint-leading wicket-taker in the 2022 Women's Twenty20 Cup, with 13 wickets at an average of 10.00. She was again the side's joint-leading wicket-taker in the 2023 Women's Twenty20 Cup, with five wickets at an average of 15.40.

In 2020, Graham played for the Northern Diamonds in the Rachael Heyhoe Flint Trophy. The team reached the final of the tournament, and whilst Graham only took two wickets in her five matches, her new ball bowling was described as "crucial", and she had an economy of just 3.87. In 2021, Graham took six wickets in the Rachael Heyhoe Flint Trophy and four wickets in the Charlotte Edwards Cup, helping her side reach the final of both competitions. She also played for Northern Superchargers in The Hundred, appearing in four matches. At the end of the season it was announced that Graham had moved to North West Thunder, and signed a professional contract with her new side. She played eleven matches for her new side, across the Charlotte Edwards Cup and the Rachael Heyhoe Flint Trophy, taking six wickets. She also moved to Manchester Originals in The Hundred, playing two matches and taking one wicket. During the 2023 season, Graham went on loan from North West Thunder to Western Storm, for four Rachael Heyhoe Flint Trophy matches in July. She played four matches for Storm, taking one wicket. She also played five matches for North West Thunder, taking three wickets. In 2024, she played 15 matches for North West Thunder, across the Rachael Heyhoe Flint Trophy and the Charlotte Edwards Cup, taking 13 wickets.

In December 2022, it was announced that Graham had signed for Northern Districts as an overseas player to play in the 2022–23 Super Smash. She played eight matches for the side in the tournament, taking seven wickets at an average of 21.00.

Graham also played in the 2011 and 2012 Super Fours.

She announced her retirement from professional cricket in December 2025.
