= Emperor of Exmoor =

English red stag, presumably killed in 2010

The Emperor of Exmoor

The Emperor of Exmoor, a red stag (Cervus elaphus), was reportedly killed in October 2010. Its weight has been estimated as over 300 pounds (136 kg) and its height at 9 feet (2.7 m). Red deer on Exmoor National Park are larger than red deer in Scotland owing to their diet.

The deer was given its nickname by photographer Richard Austin. Its body was reportedly discovered near the A361 road between Tiverton and Barnstaple in Devon, during the annual rutting season. It was reportedly killed by a licensed hunter, and an unnamed man reported hearing two shots. Within a few days, other local observers reported having seen the animal alive, leading to the suggestion that this may be a manufactured story. Few of the reported facts can actually be verified. The Guardian called the story "a myth".

The animal was believed to be around 12 years old at the time of the claim, but healthy. Older animals are sometimes culled, particularly when their incisor teeth are worn, making it difficult for them to survive the winter, but a former worker in deer management stated that "The Emperor was starting to get past his best, but he was definitely not at that stage yet."

The same observer stated, on the topic of stalking during rut, "... we should maintain a standard and stop all persecution during this important time of the year", but the practice is legal and the importance of hunting, both in species management and to the local economy, is asserted by the national park authority.

Deer stalking is legal in Britain under the Deer Act 1991, although hunters must seek permission from the landowner. The heads can fetch over £1000. The possible death of the Emperor of Exmoor prompted several MPs to sign an Early Day Motion with the intent to ban hunting of wild animals in Britain.

A head said to resemble the Emperor's was hung in the Hartnoll Hotel in Bolham, Devon in December 2011. The head was removed after the hotel received threats.
