= Rebecca Duckworth =

English cricketer (born 2000)

Personal information
- Full name: Rebecca Eve Duckworth
- Born: 30 October 2000 (age 26)
- Batting: Right-handed
- Role: Batter

Domestic team information
- Years: Team
- 2017–2019: Lancashire
- 2019–2021: Cumbria
- 2020–2022: North West Thunder
- 2022: North Representative XI
- 2023–2024: Northern Diamonds

Career statistics
Competition	WLA	WT20
Matches	27	28
Runs scored	341	385
Batting average	17.05	32.08
100s/50s	0/2	0/1
Top score	53*	51
Balls bowled	–	6
Wickets	–	0
Bowling average	–	–
5 wickets in innings	–	0
10 wickets in match	–	0
Best bowling	–	–
Catches/stumpings	3/–	5/–
- Source: CricketArchive, 17 October 2024

Rebecca Eve Duckworth (born 30 October 2000) is an English cricketer who most recently played for Northern Diamonds. She plays as a right-handed batter. She has previously played for Lancashire, Cumbria, North Representative XI and North West Thunder.

== Domestic career ==
Duckworth made her county debut in 2017, for Lancashire against Middlesex. That season, Duckworth was part of the side as Lancashire won the double of the County Championship and Twenty20 Cup. In 2019, Duckworth played two County Championship matches for Cumbria, hitting 53* in her first match and 40* in her second. In 2021, it was confirmed that Duckworth is dual-registered with both Lancashire and Cumbria, and would be part of the Cumbria squad for the upcoming season. She played four matches for Cumbria in the 2021 Women's Twenty20 Cup, scoring 108 runs including what was at the time her Twenty20 high score of 40*, against Scotland A. In the 2022 Women's Twenty20 Cup, Duckworth played for North Representative XI, and was the side's leading run-scorer, with 190 runs at an average of 38.00, including her maiden Twenty20 half-century, made against North East Warriors.

In 2020, Duckworth played for North West Thunder in the Rachael Heyhoe Flint Trophy. She appeared in four matches, scoring 66 runs at an average of 22.00, with her high score of 27 helping her side to a victory over Lightning. She appeared twice for the side in 2021, once in the Rachael Heyhoe Flint Trophy and once in the Charlotte Edwards Cup. She played once for the side in 2022, against South East Stars in the Rachael Heyhoe Flint Trophy, scoring 15. At the end of the 2022 season, it was announced that Duckworth had been released by North West Thunder. She subsequently signed for Northern Diamonds ahead of the 2023 season. She played six matches for the side that season, scoring 55 runs at an average of 13.75. In 2024, she played 9 matches for Northern Diamonds, across the Rachael Heyhoe Flint Trophy and the Charlotte Edwards Cup, with a high score of 51.
