= Hannah Jones (Lancashire cricketer) =

English cricketer

Personal information
- Full name: Hannah Louisa Jones
- Born: 10 February 1999 (age 27); Manchester, England
- Batting: Left-handed
- Bowling: Slow left-arm orthodox
- Role: Bowler

Domestic team information
- Years: Team
- 2014–present: Lancashire
- 2020–2024: North West Thunder
- 2021–2022: Manchester Originals
- 2022: North Representative XI

Career statistics
Competition	WLA	WT20
Matches	55	53
Runs scored	139	39
Batting average	9.26	9.75
100s/50s	0/0	0/0
Top score	26*	17
Balls bowled	2,519	1,016
Wickets	62	47
Bowling average	25.62	18.89
5 wickets in innings	1	0
10 wickets in match	0	0
Best bowling	5/33	3/17
Catches/stumpings	9/–	11/–
- Source: CricketArchive, 17 October 2024

Hannah Louisa Jones (born 10 February 1999) is an English cricketer who currently plays for Lancashire. She plays as a slow left-arm orthodox bowler. She has previously played for North Representative XI, North West Thunder and Manchester Originals.

== Early life ==
Jones was born on 10 February 1999. She plays club cricket for Didsbury Cricket Club.

== Domestic career ==
Jones made her county debut in 2014 for Lancashire in a match against Ireland, in which she bowled 5 overs, with 4 maidens and conceding just 4 runs. She took five wickets apiece in both the County Championship and Twenty20 Cup, with an economy rate of just 2.55 in the Championship. Jones' strength continued to be her extremely low economy rate, for example conceding only 2.42 runs per over in the 2015 Women's Twenty20 Cup, a tournament in which she also recorded her Twenty20 best bowling figures, taking 2/3 from 3 overs in a match against the Netherlands. Jones did not play in Lancashire's successful 2017 season, where they won two trophies, but returned in 2018 and has been a regular in their side since. She was the side's leading wicket-taker in the 2021 Women's Twenty20 Cup as they won the North Group, with 6 wickets at an average of 6.33. She played for North Representative XI in the 2022 Women's Twenty20 Cup, taking 4 wickets at an average of 17.75.

In 2020, Jones played for North West Thunder in the Rachael Heyhoe Flint Trophy. She appeared in all 6 matches, taking 4 wickets at an average of 32.75 and an economy of just 3.16. In December 2020, it was announced that Jones was one of the 41 female cricketers that had signed a full-time domestic contract. Jones was ever-present for the side in 2021, across the Rachael Heyhoe Flint Trophy and the 2021 Charlotte Edwards Cup. She was Thunder's most economical bowler in the Charlotte Edwards Cup, with four wickets at an economy of 4.64. She was also the second-highest wicket-taker across the whole Rachael Heyhoe Flint Trophy, with 14 wickets. In the final group stage match against South East Stars, Jones took her maiden five-wicket haul, 5/33 to bowl her side to a 55-run victory. She also played four matches for Manchester Originals in The Hundred, taking four wickets, including 3/17 in the side's victory over Southern Brave. She was ever-present for North West Thunder in 2022, and was the side's leading wicket-taker in the Charlotte Edwards Cup, with nine wickets at an average of 13.00. She also played all six matches for Manchester Originals in The Hundred, taking four wickets. In 2023, she played three matches for North West Thunder, all in the Rachael Heyhoe Flint Trophy, taking four wickets. In 2024, she played 17 matches for North West Thunder, across the Rachael Heyhoe Flint Trophy and the Charlotte Edwards Cup, taking 22 wickets at an average of 20.90 in the Rachael Heyhoe Flint Trophy.
