= Weetwood Playing Fields =

Sports ground at the University of Leeds

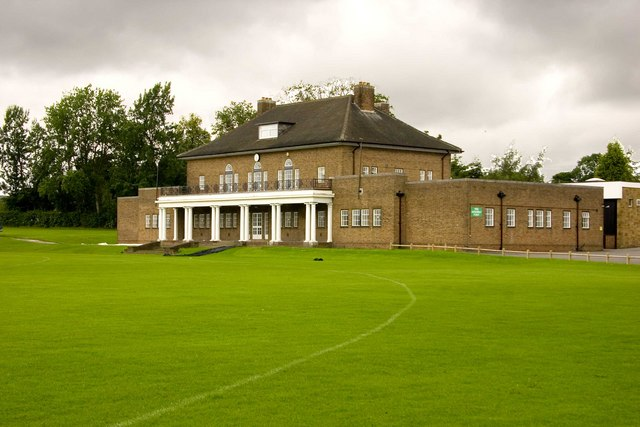

Ground information
- Location: Leeds, West Yorkshire, England
- Coordinates: 53.836911°N 1.588998°W
- Establishment: 1934

Team information
Leeds/Bradford MCCU	(2019)
- As of 12 August 2020; Source: Ground profile

Weetwood Playing Fields is a sports facility of the University of Leeds located in the Leeds suburb of Weetwood, West Yorkshire, England.

== Cricket ==
Among the facilities are a cricket ground, which is used by Leeds/Bradford MCCU. The team played a first-class match at the ground against Yorkshire in 2019, which resulted in a Yorkshire victory by an innings and 151 runs. The ground was scheduled to host a further first-class match between Leeds/Bradford MCCU and Warwickshire in 2020, however this was cancelled due to the COVID-19 pandemic in England. With the loss of first-class status for MCC University matches from the 2021 season onward, first-class cricket at the Playing Fields has ended for the foreseeable future.

== Records ==
=== First-class ===
- Highest team total: 489 for 8 declared by Yorkshire v Leeds/Bradford MCCU, 2019
- Lowest team total: 119 all out by Leeds/Bradford MCCU v Yorkshire, as above
- Highest individual innings: 176 by Tom Kohler-Cadmore for Yorkshire v Leeds/Bradford MCCU, as above
- Best innings bowling figures: 5 for 16 by Matthew Waite, as above

== See also ==
- List of cricket grounds in England and Wales
