= Bolham, Devon =

Village in Devon, England

Coordinates: 50.91°N 03.49°W

Bolham
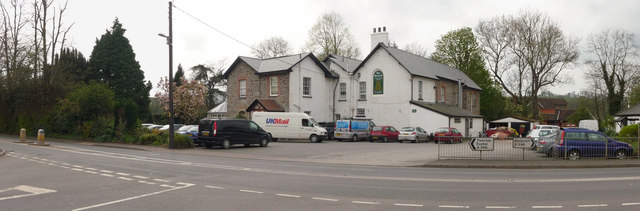
- The Hartnoll Hotel

- Location within Devon
- OS grid reference: SS9514
- Shire county: Devon
- Region: South West
- Country: England
- Sovereign state: United Kingdom
- Police: Devon and Cornwall
- Fire: Devon and Somerset
- Ambulance: South Western

Bolham is a village in the parish of Tiverton in Devon, England. It was the object of much attention in December 2011 when a Stags head, said to resemble that of the Exmoor Emperor was hung in the Hartnoll Hotel in Bolham. The head was removed after the hotel received threats. Adjoining Bolham is the historic estate of Knightshayes, Tiverton, (now owned by the National Trust) the owners of which at some time also owned Bolham. Television producer Graham Williams lived there and ran the Hartnoll Hotel until he took his own life in 1990, aged 45.
