= Campbell Park Cricket Ground =

Cricket ground in Buckinghamshire, England

Coordinates: 52.0496°N 0.7379°W

Campbell Park
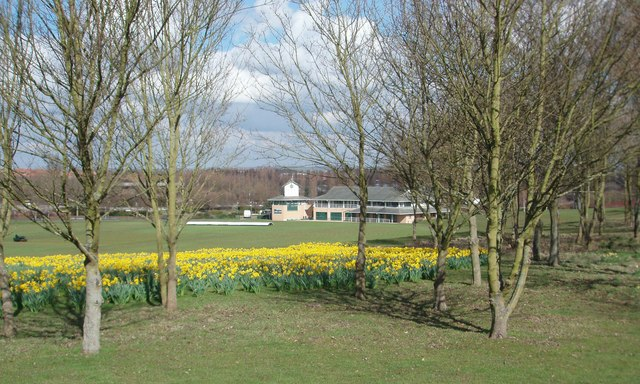
- Interactive map of Campbell Park

Ground information
- Location: Milton Keynes, Buckinghamshire
- Country: England
- Establishment: 1981 (first recorded match)

International information
- Only women's ODI: 26 June 1999: India v Ireland

Team information
Northamptonshire	(1997 & 2004-)
Buckinghamshire	(1998-2000)
- As of 22 August 2010; Source: Ground profile

Campbell Park is a cricket ground in Milton Keynes, Buckinghamshire, located in Campbell Park. The first recorded match on the ground in 1981, when the Northamptonshire Second XI played the Leicestershire Second XI in the Second Eleven Championship.

The first List-A match held on the ground came in 1997 when Northamptonshire played Nottinghamshire in AXA Life League. In 1999, the ground hosted a List-A match between New Zealand A and Sri Lanka A. As of March 2012, the most recent List-A match held on the ground came in 2004 when Northamptonshire played Hampshire in the Totesport League.

In 2000, Campbell Park hosted a single first-class match between a First-Class Counties Select XI and New Zealand.

In 2005, the ground hosted its first Twenty20 match when Northamptonshire played Gloucestershire in the 2005 Twenty20 Cup. From 2005 to 2008, the ground 4 Twenty20 matches, the last of which saw Northamptonshire play Warwickshire in the 2008 Twenty20 Cup.

Between 1998 and 2000, Buckinghamshire used the ground for Minor Counties matches, playing 2 Minor Counties Championship matches against Staffordshire and Suffolk and a single MCCA Knockout Trophy match against the Sussex Cricket Board.

Campbell Park has held 2 Women's One Day Internationals; the first was between England women and South Africa women in 1997 and the second between India women and Ireland women in 1999.

In local domestic cricket, the ground was the home venue of the Northamptonshire Cricket Academy who play in the Northamptonshire Cricket League.

As of 2022, Campbell Park is used by Stony Stratford Cricket Club for their Premier Division and Division 2 fixtures in the Northamptonshire Cricket League.
