= Elizabeth Priddle =

Scottish cricketer (born 1993)

Personal information
- Full name: Elizabeth Margaret Priddle
- Born: 16 November 1993 (age 32); Dundee, Scotland
- Batting: Right-handed
- Bowling: Right-arm medium
- Role: All-rounder

Domestic team information
- Years: Team
- 2018–2022: Cumbria

Career statistics
Competition	WLA	WT20
Matches	34	41
Runs scored	573	433
Batting average	18.48	12.73
100s/50s	0/4	0/1
Top score	88	90
Balls bowled	407	256
Wickets	14	9
Bowling average	23.64	30.55
5 wickets in innings	0	0
10 wickets in match	0	0
Best bowling	3/38	2/5
Catches/stumpings	4/–	3/–
- Source: CricketArchive, 20 April 2022

Elizabeth Margaret Priddle (born 16 November 1993) is a Scottish cricketer. An all-rounder, she plays as a right-handed batter and right-arm medium bowler. She played for the Scotland women's national cricket team between 2010 and 2017, including playing in the 2017 Women's Cricket World Cup Qualifier in February 2017. She has played domestic cricket for Cumbria.
