= Old Buckenham Hall Cricket Ground =

Cricket ground in Norfolk, England

Old Buckenham Hall
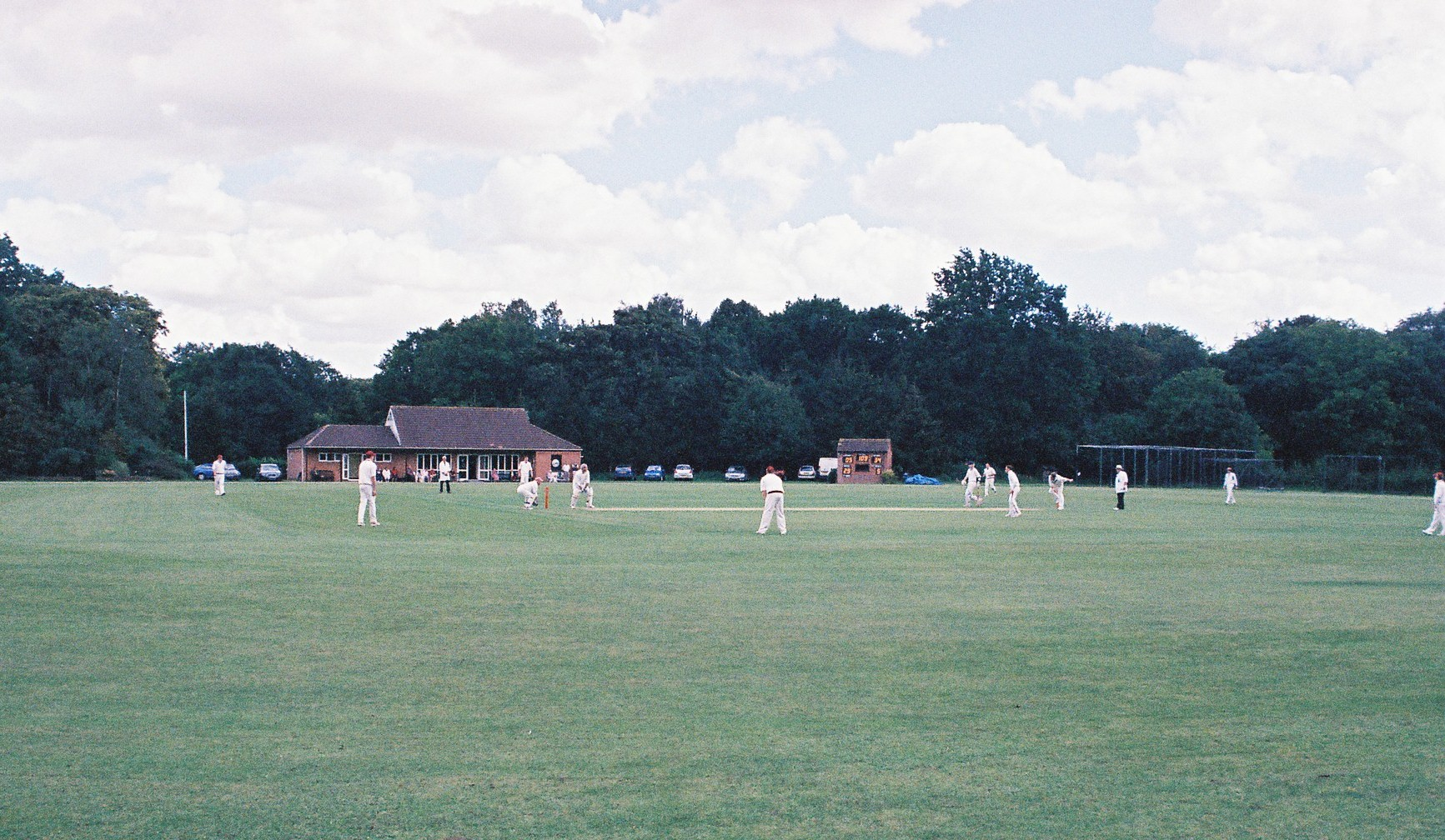
- A match in progress at Old Buckenham Hall Ground in the 2020s
- Interactive map of Old Buckenham Hall

Ground information
- Location: Attleborough, Norfolk
- Country: England
- Coordinates: 52.469°N 1.033°E
- Establishment: 1912

Team information
LG Robinson's XI	(1912–1921)
Old Buckenham CC	(1961–present)
- As of 29 April 2023; Source: Ground profile

Old Buckenham Hall is a cricket ground in Old Buckenham, near Attleborough in Norfolk. The ground was initially established in the early 20th century and was used for six first-class matches by its owner, Australian Lionel Robinson. The ground later became part of a school and was reestablished as a cricket ground in the 1960s. It has since been used by the Norfolk Women cricket team for fixtures.

== History ==
The estate at Old Buckenham Hall was purchased by the Australian financier Lionel Robinson in 1906 from Frederick Duleep Singh. Robinson expanded the estate from 340 to 2000 acres and within the space of four years built two separate cricket grounds, each equipped with a thatched timber pavilion. The first ground was half a mile from the Hall and adjacent to Old Buckenham Stud, which Robinson established to further his involvement in horse racing. The second – still in use today – was created in a woodland clearing close to the rebuilt Hall, Robinson having replaced Duleep Singh's Georgian house with a vast neo-Jacobean mansion.

His personal cricket team played six first-class cricket matches on the ground. The first was against the touring South Africans in 1912, with three further first-class matches taking place before the First World War. Cambridge University and J. R. Mason's XI were the side's opponents in 1913, with Oxford University playing on the ground in 1914. In 1919, Robinson hosted the Australian Imperial Forces, a team formed of Australian servicemen who were facing a prolonged delay to their demobilisation. The AIF team had been selected from around 100 Australian servicemen who had turned up for trials at Lord's and The Oval; the match was twelve-a-side.

In early May 1921, a final first-class match was held at the Hall ground between L. G. Robinson's XI and the touring Australians. Robinson's team was captained by his cricket manager, the former England captain Archie MacLaren, and included Jack Hobbs, Percy Chapman and Johnny Douglas. Australia were led by Warwick Armstrong and included Jack Gregory – who had made his first-class debut with the AIF team at Old Buckenham two years previously – Warren Bardsley and Charlie Macartney. The three-day match was rain-affected and ended in a draw. Hobbs top-scored with 85, an effort he later nominated as possibly his finest ever innings. A crowd of up to 10,000 watched Hobbs bat on the second day, believed to be the largest ever to attend a cricket match in Norfolk.

== School years and fire ==
Following Robinson's death in July 1922, the Hall and estate were sold and came into the possession of Ernest Gates who continued to stage cricket at the ground until putting the property up for sale in 1932. Four years later, Old Buckenham Hall School was established there and the cricket ground formed part of the school's sporting facilities. The Hall, however, was destroyed by fire in December 1952, only an annexed building (now a private residence still bearing the name Old Buckenham Hall) surviving the blaze. The school moved to alternative premises, eventually becoming established at Brettenham, although retaining the name Old Buckenham Hall School. The thatched cricket pavilion at Old Buckenham was also dismantled and moved to the school's playing fields at Brettenham where it still stands.

== Restoration ==
After the school's departure, the Old Buckenham Hall cricket ground fell into disuse until it was restored in the early 1960s by members of Old Buckenham Cricket Club at the invitation of the then landowners, Oliver and Greeba Sear. Prior to that, the club had played on the village green. In 1982 the club bought the ground and six years later erected a brick pavilion and scorers’ box. The ground remains the home of Old Buckenham Cricket Club. It is now named The Horry Panks Cricket Ground in honour of a long-serving player and groundsman whose family was instrumental in its 1960s revival.

== First-class records ==
A total of six first-class matches were played on the ground between 1912 and 1921, all of them featuring LG Robinson's XI as the home side. In 2019, the Norfolk Women cricket team played a single List A match on the ground. The side played all four of its home Twenty20 fixtures on the ground, having intended to use the ground during the 2020 season, which was cancelled by the COVID-19 pandemic.

- Highest team total: 362 for 8 declared by LG Robinson's XI against Australian Imperial Force Touring XI, 1919
- Lowest team total: 66 all out by South Africans against LG Robinson's XI, 1912
- Highest individual score: 111 by TC O'Brien for LG Robinson's XI against Oxford University, 1914
- Best bowling in an innings: 7/88 by SF Barnes for LG Robinson's XI against JR Mason's XI, 1913
- Best bowling in a match: 11/120 by SJ Pegler for South Africans against LG Robinson's XI, 1912
