= Alex MacDonald (cricketer) =

English cricketer

Personal information
- Full name: Alexandra Louise MacDonald
- Born: 3 October 1991 (age 35); Kingston upon Thames, Greater London, England
- Batting: Left-handed
- Bowling: Right-arm medium
- Role: All-rounder

Domestic team information
- Years: Team
- 2008–2014: Gloucestershire
- 2014–2015: Yorkshire
- 2016: Staffordshire
- 2016: Loughborough Lightning
- 2017: Gloucestershire
- 2019–2021: Yorkshire
- 2020–2021: Northern Diamonds
- 2021: North Representative XI
- 2022: Lincolnshire

Career statistics
Competition	WLA	WT20
Matches	65	53
Runs scored	1,705	856
Batting average	37.06	23.78
100s/50s	2/11	0/6
Top score	117*	71*
Balls bowled	1,958	816
Wickets	44	34
Bowling average	21.65	20.47
5 wickets in innings	1	0
10 wickets in match	0	0
Best bowling	5/12	4/17
Catches/stumpings	26/–	16/–
- Source: CricketArchive, 8 October 2022

Alexandra Louise MacDonald (born 3 October 1991) is an English cricketer who plays as an all-rounder, batting left-handed and bowling right-arm medium. She has played domestic cricket for Gloucestershire, Staffordshire, Yorkshire, North Representative XI, Lincolnshire and Northern Diamonds.

== Early life ==
MacDonald was born on 3 October 1991 in Kingston upon Thames, Greater London.

== Domestic career ==
=== County cricket ===
MacDonald made her county debut in 2008, for Gloucestershire against Dorset, in which she scored 34 in a 216 run victory. She took her maiden county five-wicket haul a year later, taking 5/12 against Dorset, as well as scoring her first county half-century the same season, with 59 against Wiltshire. She played for Gloucestershire until the 2014 season, with her best season coming in 2013, when she hit 468 runs in the County Championship, the third highest overall, with 1 century and 4 half-centuries.

MacDonald played for Yorkshire in the 2014 Women's Twenty20 Cup, and was their leading run-scorer in the competition, with 193 runs including her Twenty20 high score of 71*. She also played one match for Gloucestershire in the 2014 Women's County Championship, in which she hit her highest List A score, of 117*. She played one more season for Yorkshire, in 2015, in which she took 4/28 in a match against Surrey.

In 2016, MacDonald played one season for Staffordshire, in which she was most successful in the 2016 Women's Twenty20 Cup, scoring 99 runs at an average of 24.75. In 2017, she returned to Gloucestershire for one match, in which she hit 81 against Essex.

After a season's break, MacDonald returned to Yorkshire for the 2019 season, and was most successful with the ball in the Twenty20 Cup, taking 8 wickets at an average of 7.62. In 2021, MacDonald was named as part of the Yorkshire contingent of the North Representative XI squad for the Twenty20 Cup, as well as playing one match for Yorkshire. She hit one half-century for the North Representative XI, scoring 50 to help her side to a 5 wicket victory over North East Warriors. In 2022, she joined Lincolnshire for the Twenty20 Cup, scoring 56* in the second of two matches she played for the side that season.

=== Regional cricket ===
MacDonald was also in the Loughborough Lightning squad for the 2016 Women's Cricket Super League, but did not play a match.

In 2020, MacDonald played for Northern Diamonds in the Rachael Heyhoe Flint Trophy. She appeared in seven matches as the side reached the final, scoring 122 runs at an average of 20.33 and taking 4 wickets at an average of 20.25. Her high score for the side came in a match against North West Thunder, in which she scored 92 to bring the team within one win of the final. In 2021, she played seven matches for the side across the Rachael Heyhoe Flint Trophy and the Charlotte Edwards Cup, with a high score of 39. She also took 9 wickets in the Charlotte Edwards Cup, including her Twenty20 best bowling figures of 4/17, taken against Western Storm.
