= Niamh Holland =

English cricketer

Personal information
- Full name: Niamh Fiona Holland
- Born: 27 October 2004 (age 22); Yeovil, Somerset, England
- Batting: Right-handed
- Bowling: Right-arm medium
- Role: All-rounder

Domestic team information
- Years: Team
- 2019–present: Somerset
- 2020–2024: Western Storm
- 2023: London Spirit

Career statistics
Competition	WLA	WT20
Matches	43	54
Runs scored	428	521
Batting average	13.37	13.71
100s/50s	0/1	0/1
Top score	78	60
Balls bowled	600	495
Wickets	16	29
Bowling average	37.75	19.51
5 wickets in innings	0	0
10 wickets in match	0	0
Best bowling	2/17	3/11
Catches/stumpings	6/–	8/–
- Source: CricketArchive, 6 August 2025

Niamh Fiona Holland (born 27 October 2004) is an English cricketer who currently plays for Somerset having previously appeared for Western Storm and London Spirit. An all-rounder, she is a right-arm medium bowler and right-handed batter.

== Early life ==
Holland was born in Yeovil, Somerset, but her home town is nearby Langport, and she plays club cricket for Street Cricket Club.

== Domestic career ==
Holland made her county debut in 2019, for Somerset against Wales. She achieved her List A high score on debut, scoring 37. She took 10 wickets in the 2019 Women's Twenty20 Cup at an average of 15.10, helping Somerset win Division 2 of the competition. In 2021, she took 6 wickets at an average of 17.00 in the Twenty20 Cup. She was Somerset's joint-leading wicket-taker in the 2022 Women's Twenty20 Cup, with 12 wickets at an average of 18.11.

In 2020, Holland played for Western Storm in the Rachael Heyhoe Flint Trophy. She appeared in all six matches, and took one wicket. She was retained in the Western Storm squad for the 2021 season, but did not play a match. She was also included in the Western Storm Academy squad for 2021. She played seven matches for Western Storm in 2022, across the Charlotte Edwards Cup and the Rachael Heyhoe Flint Trophy, taking four wickets.

In March 2023, it was announced that Holland had signed her first professional contract with Western Storm. That season, she played 19 matches for Western Storm, across the Rachael Heyhoe Flint Trophy and the Charlotte Edwards Cup, taking two wickets and with a high score of 44. She also played three matches for London Spirit in The Hundred. In 2024, she played 18 matches for Western Storm, across the Rachael Heyhoe Flint Trophy and the Charlotte Edwards Cup, scoring 235 runs and taking 5 wickets.

== International career ==
In October 2022, Holland was selected in the England Under-19 squad for the 2023 ICC Under-19 Women's T20 World Cup. She played six matches in the tournament, scoring 138 runs at an average of 27.60 including scoring 59 against Zimbabwe.
