= Steph Hutchins =

English cricketer

Personal information
- Full name: Stephanie Hutchins
- Born: 6 October 1998 (age 28)
- Batting: Right-handed
- Bowling: Right-arm off break
- Role: Bowler

Domestic team information
- Years: Team
- 2015–present: Devon
- 2020–2021: Western Storm

Career statistics
Competition	WLA	WT20
Matches	29	45
Runs scored	75	169
Batting average	12.50	18.77
100s/50s	0/0	0/0
Top score	19	30
Balls bowled	1,134	683
Wickets	37	43
Bowling average	16.13	9.62
5 wickets in innings	0	0
10 wickets in match	0	0
Best bowling	4/35	3/2
Catches/stumpings	15/–	12/–
- Source: CricketArchive, 23 October 2023

Stephanie Hutchins (born 6 October 1998) is an English cricketer who currently plays for Devon. She plays as a right-arm off break bowler. She previously played for Western Storm.

== Early life ==
Hutchins was born on 6 October 1998, and her home town is Romford. She also works as a cricket coach.

== Domestic career ==
Hutchins made her county debut in 2015, for Devon against Scotland. She achieved her best List A bowling figures in 2018, taking 4/35 against Surrey. She became captain of Devon for the 2021 season, and took 7 wickets in the 2021 Women's Twenty20 Cup, including taking her Twenty20 best bowling figures of 3/2 against Wiltshire. She took eight wickets in eight matches for the side in the 2022 Women's Twenty20 Cup.

In 2020, Hutchins played for Western Storm in the Rachael Heyhoe Flint Trophy. She appeared in four matches, taking three wickets at an average of 43.33. She appeared in two matches for Western Storm in 2021, and took 2/27 in her one Rachael Heyhoe Flint Trophy match, against Northern Diamonds.
