= Emily Edgcombe =

English cricketer

Personal information
- Full name: Emily Mae Edgcombe
- Born: 25 June 1999 (age 27); Truro, Cornwall, England
- Batting: Right-handed
- Bowling: Left-arm medium
- Role: All-rounder

Domestic team information
- Years: Team
- 2014–2016: Cornwall
- 2017–2021: Devon
- 2020–2021: Western Storm
- 2022–present: Somerset

Career statistics
Competition	WLA	WT20
Matches	34	52
Runs scored	375	726
Batting average	16.30	20.74
100s/50s	0/2	0/5
Top score	59	82
Balls bowled	1,264	959
Wickets	34	42
Bowling average	20.00	16.97
5 wickets in innings	0	0
10 wickets in match	0	0
Best bowling	3/41	4/12
Catches/stumpings	11/–	16/–
- Source: CricketArchive, 23 October 2023

Emily Mae Edgcombe (born 25 June 1999) is an English cricketer who currently plays for Somerset. An all-rounder, she plays as a right-handed batter and left-arm medium bowler. She has previously played for Cornwall, Devon and Western Storm.

== Early life ==
Edgcombe was born on 25 June 1999 in Truro, Cornwall. She also works for the NHS.

== Domestic career ==
Edgcombe made her county debut for in 2014, for Cornwall against Dorset, and took one wicket. She moved to Devon ahead of the 2017 season, and achieved her Twenty20 high score in 2018, scoring 82 against Wiltshire. She captained Devon in the 2019 Women's Twenty20 Cup.

In 2020, Edgcombe played for Western Storm in the Rachael Heyhoe Flint Trophy. She appeared in three matches, taking one wicket against Sunrisers. In 2021, she played three matches for Western Storm, all in the Charlotte Edwards Cup, taking one wicket.

She joined Somerset ahead of the 2022 Women's Twenty20 Cup. She was the side's joint-leading wicket-taker in the tournament, with 12 wickets at an average of 18.71. Ahead of the 2023 season, she was named as captain of the side. She was Somerset's leading wicket-taker in the 2023 Women's Twenty20 Cup that season, with 6 wickets at an average of 5.83 including 4/12 taken against Wales.

Sporting positions
Preceded by Sophie Luff	Somerset women's cricket captain 2023–present	Succeeded by Incumbent
