= Alice Dyson =

English cricketer (born 1999)

Personal information
- Full name: Alice Emily Dyson
- Born: 28 January 1999 (age 27); Tameside, Greater Manchester, England
- Batting: Right-handed
- Bowling: Right-arm medium
- Role: Bowler

Domestic team information
- Years: Team
- 2012–2018: Derbyshire
- 2017–2019: Lancashire Thunder
- 2019–present: Lancashire
- 2019: → Cumbria (on loan)
- 2020–2022: North West Thunder
- 2021: Manchester Originals
- 2022: North Representative XI

Career statistics
| Competition | WLA | WT20 |
|---|---|---|
| Matches | 38 | 56 |
| Runs scored | 329 | 92 |
| Batting average | 15.66 | 5.41 |
| 100s/50s | 0/0 | 0/0 |
| Top score | 49* | 15 |
| Balls bowled | 1,394 | 842 |
| Wickets | 31 | 32 |
| Bowling average | 30.58 | 23.40 |
| 5 wickets in innings | 0 | 0 |
| 10 wickets in match | 0 | 0 |
| Best bowling | 3/30 | 4/19 |
| Catches/stumpings | 6/– | 11/– |
- Source: CricketArchive, 4 October 2022

Alice Emily Dyson (born 28 January 1999) is an English cricketer who currently plays for Lancashire. She plays as a right-arm medium bowler. She has previously played for Derbyshire, North Representative XI, Lancashire Thunder Manchester Originals and North West Thunder.

== Early life ==
Dyson was born on 28 January 1999 in Tameside, Greater Manchester.

== Domestic career ==
Dyson made her county debut in 2012, for Derbyshire against Northumberland, in which she took 1/9 from four overs. In 2014, she took 6 wickets at an average of 22.50 in the County Championship, including her List A best bowling figures of 3/30 against Oxfordshire. In 2017, Dyson took 9 wickets at an average of 19.44 in the County Championship, as well as hitting her List A high score, scoring 49* from 41 balls in a 2 wicket victory over Worcestershire.

Dyson joined Lancashire ahead of the 2019 season, helping them to second place in Division 1 of the Twenty20 Cup. She also appeared in one match for Cumbria, scoring 18 runs and taking 1/14 from 8 overs. She took three wickets for the side in the 2021 Women's Twenty20 Cup as Lancashire won the North Group. She played for North Representative XI in the 2022 Women's Twenty20 Cup, taking six wickets including her Twenty20 best bowling figures of 4/19, taken against Cumbria.

Dyson was also in Lancashire Thunder's squad in the Women's Cricket Super League between 2017 and 2019. She played three matches in 2019, bowling four overs for no wicket.

In 2020, Dyson played for North West Thunder in the Rachael Heyhoe Flint Trophy. She appeared in four matches, scoring 52 runs at an average of 17.33 and taking 2 wickets. Her best performance came against Northern Diamonds, where she took 2/38 and hit 25*. She took three wickets for the side in 2021 across the Rachael Heyhoe Flint Trophy and the Charlotte Edwards Cup, in five matches. She also played two matches for Manchester Originals in The Hundred. She was in North West Thunder's squad in 2022, but did not play a match. At the end of the 2022 season, it was announced that Dyson had been released by North West Thunder.
