= Natalie Brown (cricketer) =

English cricketer

Personal information
- Full name: Natalie Brown
- Born: 16 October 1990 (age 36); Whiston, Merseyside, England
- Batting: Right-handed
- Bowling: Right-arm medium
- Role: All-rounder

Domestic team information
- Years: Team
- 2006–present: Lancashire
- 2016–2016: Lancashire Thunder
- 2020–2022: North West Thunder
- 2021: Manchester Originals

Career statistics
| Competition | WLA | WT20 |
|---|---|---|
| Matches | 113 | 82 |
| Runs scored | 1,975 | 887 |
| Batting average | 20.78 | 17.74 |
| 100s/50s | 2/6 | 0/2 |
| Top score | 112* | 80 |
| Balls bowled | 3,154 | 736 |
| Wickets | 68 | 44 |
| Bowling average | 26.08 | 16.34 |
| 5 wickets in innings | 1 | 0 |
| 10 wickets in match | 0 | 0 |
| Best bowling | 5/9 | 4/21 |
| Catches/stumpings | 38/– | 19/– |
- Source: CricketArchive, 4 October 2022

Natalie Brown (born 16 October 1990) is an English cricketer who currently plays for Lancashire. An all-rounder, she is a right-handed batter and right-arm medium bowler. She previously played for Lancashire Thunder, Manchester Originals and North West Thunder.

== Early life ==
Brown was born on 16 October 1990 in Whiston, Merseyside.

== Domestic career ==
Brown made her county debut in 2006, for Lancashire against Somerset. Brown's first standout year came with the ball in 2008, where she took 8 wickets at an average of 22.62 in the County Championship, including 4/31 taken against Somerset. In 2010 she again did well with the ball, taking 12 wickets in the County Championship at an average of 18.58. In 2011, Brown made her maiden county century, scoring 101 against Devon, and overall scoring 250 runs at an average of 31.25, the most for her side. In 2012, she was her side's leading run-scorer and leading wicket-taker in the County Championship, with 198 runs and 12 wickets, including her List A best bowling of 5/9, taken against Wales.

In the 2013 and 2014 County Championships, Brown again passed the 200-run mark, and in 2014 made her second county century, scoring 112* against Cheshire. In 2015, she was again her side's leading run-scorer in the County Championship, with 156 runs, and in 2016 she was Lancashire's leading wicket-taker, with 9 wickets at an average of 12.77, in the Twenty20 Cup.

In 2017, Lancashire won the double of the County Championship and the 2017 Women's Twenty20 Cup, with Brown appearing in every match. Personal highpoints came mainly in the Twenty20 Cup, where she hit her T20 high score of 70 against Middlesex, and took 9 wickets at an average of 9.44. The next season, Brown took 7 wickets at an average of 13.14 in the Twenty20 Cup. She played four matches for the side in the 2021 Women's Twenty20 Cup, scoring 31 runs and taking 1 wicket. In the 2022 Women's Twenty20 Cup, Brown achieved both her Twenty20 high score and best bowling figures, scoring 80 against Cumbria and taking 4/21 against Derbyshire.

Brown also played for Lancashire Thunder in the Women's Cricket Super League between 2016 and 2019. She played 15 matches overall, scoring 66 runs at an average of 8.25 and taking 1 wicket.

In 2020, Brown played for North West Thunder in the Rachael Heyhoe Flint Trophy. She appeared in all six matches, scoring 189 runs at an average of 31.50 and taking 4 wickets. She hit one half-century, scoring 52 in a victory over Lightning. In 2021, she appeared in ten matches for the side across the Rachael Heyhoe Flint Trophy and the Charlotte Edwards Cup, taking two wickets and making a high score of 25. She also played for Manchester Originals in The Hundred, making four appearances. Brown played two matches for North West Thunder in 2022, both in the Rachael Heyhoe Flint Trophy, scoring 33 runs. At the end of the 2022 season, it was announced that Brown had been released by North West Thunder.

Brown also played in the Super Fours in 2011 and 2012, for Rubies, helping the side win the T20 competition in 2012.
