= North Representative XI =

Team information
- Founded: 2021
- Home ground: Leyland CC, Leyland

History
- T20 Cup wins: 0

The North Representative XI were a women's cricket team made up of players from across Northern England. They were formed in 2021 to take part in the Women's Twenty20 Cup, becoming the sixth team in the North Group to give the group an even number of teams: they finished 3rd, with 3 wins. They continued to compete in the 2022 Women's Twenty20 Cup, finishing sixth in their group of seven, but were removed from the competition ahead of the 2023 Women's Twenty20 Cup. Their squad included players from Lancashire, Cheshire, Cumbria, North East Warriors and Yorkshire, and they therefore had links with the regional sides North West Thunder and Northern Diamonds.

== Players ==
=== Notable players ===
Players who have played for North Representative XI and played internationally are listed below, in order of first international appearance (given in brackets):

- (United Arab Emirates) Katie Thompson (2025)

== Seasons ==
=== Women's Twenty20 Cup ===
| Season | Division | League standings | | | | | | | | Notes |
| Season | Division | P | W | L | T | A/C | NRR | Pts | Pos | Notes |
|---|---|---|---|---|---|---|---|---|---|---|
| 2021 | North | 8 | 3 | 1 | 0 | 4 | –0.52 | 16 | 3rd | |
| 2022 | North | 6 | 2 | 4 | 0 | 0 | –0.62 | 8 | 6th | |

== See also ==
- Lancashire Women cricket team
- North East Warriors
- Yorkshire Women cricket team
- Northern Diamonds
- North West Thunder
