= List of Southern Brave cricketers =

Southern Brave were formed in 2019, and played their first Hundred match in the 2021 season of The Hundred against Trent Rockets for both the Men's team and the Women's team. Hundred matches are classed as Twenty20 matches and so have Twenty20 status or Women's Twenty20 status. The players in this list have all played at least one Hundred match for the Southern Brave Men's or Women's team.

Players are listed in order of appearance, where players made their debut in the same match, they are ordered by batting order. Players in Bold were overseas players for the Southern Brave.

== Key ==
**General**

- ♠ – Captain
- † – Wicket-keeper
- **First** – Year of debut for Southern Brave
- **Last** – Year of latest match played for Southern Brave
- **Mat** – Number of matches played for Southern Brave
- **Win%** – Winning percentage

**Batting**

- **Inn** – Number of innings batted
- **NO** – Number of innings not out
- **Runs** – Runs scored in career
- **HS** – Highest score
- **100** – Centuries scored
- **50** – Half-centuries scored
- **Avg** – Runs scored per dismissal
- * – Batsman remained not out

**Bowling**

- **Balls** – Balls bowled in career
- **Wkt** – Wickets taken in career
- **BBI** – Best bowling in an innings
- **BBM** – Best bowling in a match
- **Ave** – Average runs per wicket

**Fielding**

- **Ca** – Catches taken
- **St** – Stumpings effected

== List of players ==
=== Women's players ===
No.	Name	Nationality	First	Last	Mat	Runs	HS	Avg	Balls	Wkt	BBI	Ave	Ca	St
No.	Name	Nationality	First	Last	Mat	Batting			Bowling				Fielding	
1	Danni Wyatt-Hodge	England	2021	2025	43	1,146	69*	28.65	20	3	2/16	10.00	17	0
2	**Smriti Mandhana**	India	2021	2024	29	676	78	26.00	0	0	–	–	16	0
3	Sophia Dunkley	England	2021	2022	17	437	58*	36.41	5	1	1/8	8.00	3	0
4	**Stafanie Taylor**	West Indies	2021	2021	9	182	45*	45.50	115	3	1/15	49.33	1	0
5	Maia Bouchier	England	2021	2026	52	950	63*	23.17	0	0	–	–	32	0
6	**Amanda-Jade Wellington**	Australia	2021	2022	17	33	25	5.50	335	31	4/12	11.67	6	0
7	Anya Shrubsole ♠	England	2021	2023	26	55	40*	18.33	459	25	4/13	20.56	2	0
8	Carla Rudd †	England	2021	2022	17	12	7*	–	0	0	–	–	4	11
9	Fi Morris	England	2021	2021	9	23	23	11.50	130	4	2/17	38.75	0	0
10	Tara Norris	United States	2021	2021	6	11	11	11.00	53	3	1/10	22.66	2	0
11	Lauren Bell	England	2021	2026	50	29	10*	5.80	967	66	4/6	16.78	7	0
12	Charlotte Taylor	England	2021	2021	3	–	–	–	35	1	1/19	65.00	0	0
13	**Gaby Lewis**	Ireland	2021	2021	2	9	9	4.50	0	0	–	–	2	0
14	Georgia Adams ♠	England	2022	2025	34	352	50*	19.55	562	38	4/11	16.63	14	0
15	Freya Kemp	England	2022	2025	34	320	41*	12.30	135	2	1/21	114.00	8	0
16	**Molly Strano**	Australia	2022	2022	1	0	–	–	20	0	–	–	0	0
17	**Tahlia McGrath**	Australia	2022	2022	7	70	31	11.66	84	3	2/36	39.33	4	0
18	**Chloe Tryon**	South Africa	2023	2025	26	293	55	20.92	335	13	2/25	31.00	6	0
19	**Maitlan Brown**	Australia	2023	2023	9	33	15*	33.00	35	1	1/8	74.00	1	0
20	Kalea Moore	England	2023	2024	10	1	1*	1.00	155	5	3/15	37.20	3	0
21	Mary Taylor	England	2023	2023	2	–	–	–	35	3	3/18	14.33	0	0
22	Rhianna Southby †	England	2023	2025	26	47	16*	9.40	0	0	–	–	10	13
23	**Charli Knott**	Australia	2024	2026	6	75	27	15.00	53	1	1/26	86.00	1	0
24	Naomi Dattani	England	2024	2026	17	62	9	10.33	10	0	–	–	1	0
25	**Lauren Cheatle**	Australia	2024	2024	7	4	2	1.33	128	7	2/6	15.85	0	0
26	Tilly Corteen-Coleman	England	2024	2026	26	2	1*	2.00	480	30	4/13	18.76	10	0
27	**Laura Wolvaardt** ♠	South Africa	2025	2026	18	436	56*	31.14	0	0	–	–	3	0
28	**Sophie Devine**	New Zealand	2025	2025	9	165	41*	27.50	170	13	3/15	14.61	2	0
29	Mady Villiers	England	2025	2025	9	33	17*	11.00	155	12	3/17	16.50	8	0
30	**Lizelle Lee** †	South Africa	2026	2026	9	183	43	20.33	0	0	–	–	5	1
31	**Jemimah Rodrigues**	India	2026	2026	6	143	42*	35.75	0	0	–	–	1	0
32	**Sophie Molineux** ♠	Australia	2026	2026	8	128	23	21.33	155	11	3/7	13.72	3	-
33	Jodi Grewcock	England	2026	2026	9	53	13*	10.60	5	0	–	–	4	0
34	Issy Wong	England	2026	2026	9	10	4	2.50	175	12	3/15	16.83	2	0
35	Sarah Glenn	England	2026	2026	9	0	0*	0.00	175	7	2/28	33.28	2	0
36	Phoebe Franklin	England	2026	2026	1	2	2	2.00	0	0	–	–	1	0

=== Men's players ===
No.	Name	Nationality	First	Last	Mat	Runs	HS	Avg	Balls	Wkt	BBI	Ave	Ca	St
No.	Name	Nationality	First	Last	Mat	Batting			Bowling				Fielding	
1	James Vince ♠	England	2021	2025	44	1,083	90*	29.27	0	0	–	–	23	0
2	**Devon Conway** †	New Zealand	2021	2023	13	312	54*	31.20	0	0	–	–	6	2
3	Alex Davies †	England	2021	2024	28	524	51*	22.78	0	0	–	–	18	3
4	Delray Rawlins	Bermuda	2021	2021	1	7	7	7.00	0	0	–	–	0	0
5	**Colin de Grandhomme**	New Zealand	2021	2021	8	56	40*	14.00	40	0	–	–	2	0
6	Ross Whiteley	England	2021	2022	18	283	52	28.30	0	0	–	–	6	0
7	Liam Dawson	England	2021	2021	4	6	5	6.00	39	0	–	–	0	0
8	Chris Jordan ♠	England	2021	2026	41	280	70*	25.45	699	44	3/18	23.02	21	0
9	George Garton	England	2021	2023	21	99	28	11.00	320	19	3/7	26.05	3	0
10	Danny Briggs	England	2021	2025	11	8	5*	–	201	13	3/14	21.07	1	0
11	Tymal Mills	England	2021	2025	36	12	8	3.00	657	51	4/13	17.60	7	0
12	**Quinton de Kock** †	South Africa	2021	2022	16	317	72*	24.38	0	0	–	–	14	1
13	Craig Overton	England	2021	2025	26	88	22*	29.33	485	31	3/16	20.03	12	0
14	Jake Lintott	England	2021	2022	17	21	10*	–	310	17	3/14	25.52	2	0
15	**Paul Stirling**	Ireland	2021	2022	9	211	74*	30.14	63	2	1/10	34.00	2	0
16	**Tim David**	Australia	2021	2023	17	196	44*	19.60	15	0	–	–	5	0
17	**Marcus Stoinis**	Australia	2022	2026	12	254	55	23.09	177	12	3/17	20.83	4	0
18	James Fuller	England	2022	2023	13	62	25	10.33	200	9	2/18	31.00	4	0
19	Rehan Ahmed	England	2022	2024	16	45	33	15.00	262	11	3/22	30.63	2	0
20	Michael Hogan	Australia	2022	2022	7	2	2*	2.00	110	7	2/20	26.42	0	0
21	Dan Moriarty	South Africa	2022	2022	1	1	1	1.00	20	0	–	–	0	0
22	Sonny Baker	England	2022	2022	3	0	0	0.00	45	2	2/28	37.50	0	0
23	**Finn Allen**	New Zealand	2023	2023	9	240	69	26.66	0	0	–	–	3	0
24	Leus du Plooy ♠	South Africa	2023	2025	27	436	55	20.76	5	0	–	–	13	0
25	Joe Weatherley	England	2023	2023	4	8	8*	8.00	0	0	–	–	1	0
26	Matthew Fisher	England	2023	2023	2	–	–	–	20	1	1/24	24.00	0	0
27	Colin Ackermann	Netherlands	2023	2023	4	32	24*	32.00	35	2	1/7	15.00	1	0
28	**Mitchell Santner**	New Zealand	2023	2023	2	–	–	–	35	1	1/17	37.00	1	0
29	**Daniel Hughes**	Australia	2024	2024	1	45	45	45.00	0	0	–	–	0	0
30	Laurie Evans †	England	2024	2025	18	197	53	16.41	0	0	–	–	15	1
31	James Coles	England	2024	2025	16	168	49*	21.00	135	6	2/10	30.83	5	0
32	Jofra Archer	England	2024	2026	21	40	10	5.71	415	25	4/9	20.80	10	0
33	**Kieron Pollard**	West Indies	2024	2024	9	157	45	26.16	0	0	–	–	10	0
34	**Akeal Hosein**	West Indies	2024	2024	9	5	5	2.50	170	12	3/23	20.75	0	0
35	**Andre Fletcher**	West Indies	2024	2024	2	2	1	1.00	0	0	–	–	0	0
36	Jason Roy	England	2025	2025	8	198	70	28.28	0	0	–	–	3	0
37	**Hilton Cartwright**	Australia	2025	2025	7	111	51*	27.75	0	0	–	–	7	0
38	**Michael Bracewell**	New Zealand	2025	2025	8	54	28	9.00	95	6	3/10	22.33	0	0
39	Reece Topley	England	2025	2025	3	4	4*	–	40	0	–	–	0	0
40	Jordan Thompson	England	2025	2025	4	51	24	25.50	69	4	2/17	27.75	1	0
41	Toby Albert †	England	2025	2025	1	4	4	4.00	0	0	–	–	2	0
42	Jamie Smith †	England	2026	2026	8	176	49	22.00	0	0	–	–	5	0
43	Ben McKinney	England	2026	2026	6	66	44	11.00	0	0	–	–	1	0
44	Thomas Rew	England	2026	2026	1	41	41	41.00	0	0	–	–	0	0
45	**David Miller**	South Africa	2026	2026	8	166	44	23.71	0	0	–	–	6	0
46	**Tristan Stubbs**	South Africa	2026	2026	8	213	53*	53.25	0	0	–	–	5	0
47	**Nikhil Chaudhary**	Australia	2026	2026	7	91	19	15.16	60	5	2/19	16.60	1	0
48	Luke Wood	England	2026	2026	7	13	10*	13.00	95	3	3/24	63.00	0	0
49	Adil Rashid	England	2026	2026	8	–	–	–	160	11	3/21	15.00	0	0
50	Daniel Worrall	Australia	2026	2026	3	–	–	–	45	2	1/15	28.00	1	0
51	Saif Zaib	England	2026	2026	2	9	6	6.00	0	0	–	–	0	0
52	Tom Abell	England	2026	2026	1	22	22	22.00	0	0	–	–	0	0
53	Moeen Ali	England	2026	2026	4	26	17	6.50	30	1	1/21	35.00	3	0
54	Michael Pepper	England	2026	2026	1	0	0	0.00	0	0	–	–	1	0
55	Caleb Falconer	England	2026	2026	1	–	–	–	0	0	–	–	0	0
56	Manny Lumsden	England	2026	2026	1	–	–	–	5	0	–	–	0	0

== See also ==
- Southern Brave
- The Hundred
