= 2022 Southern Brave season =

Cricket team season

Southern Brave
2022 season
- Coach: Mahela Jayawardene (Men's team) (England) Charlotte Edwards (Women's team)
- Captain: James Vince (Men's team) (South Africa) Anya Shrubsole (Women's team)
- Overseas player: (New Zealand) Finn Allen (Australia) Tim David (South Africa) Quinton de Kock (South Africa) Beuran Hendricks (Ireland) Paul Stirling (Australia) Marcus Stoinis (Men's team) (India) Smriti Mandhana (Australia) Tahlia McGrath (Australia) Molly Strano (Australia) Amanda-Jade Wellington (Women's team)
- Ground(s): Ageas Bowl
- The Hundred (Men's): 7th
- The Hundred (Women's): 2nd
- Most runs: Smriti Mandhana: 211 (Women's team); Alex Davies: 155 (Men's team)
- Most wickets: Amanda-Jade Wellington: 17 (Women's team); James Fuller: 9 (Men's team)

The 2022 season was the Southern Brave's second season of the 100 ball franchise cricket, The Hundred. The team entered the 2022 season having had the best combined season the year before, with the men's side being the reigning champions, and with the women's team finishing as runners-up.

While the women's team performed just as well as the 2021 season, finishing as runners-up for the second continuous season, the men's team struggled finishing in 7th place.

== Players ==
=== Men's side ===
- **Bold** denotes players with international caps.

S/N	Name	Nat.	Date of birth (age)	Batting style	Bowling style	Notes
Batters
5	Joe Weatherley	(England)	19 January 1997 (age 28)	Right-handed	Right-arm off break	
14	**James Vince**	(England)	14 March 1991 (age 34)	Right-handed	Right-arm medium	Captain
16	**Tim David**	(Australia) (Note: David has also played international cricket for Singapore.)	16 March 1996 (age 29)	Right-handed	Right-arm off break	Overseas player
39	**Paul Stirling**	(Ireland)	3 September 1990 (age 35)	Left-handed	Right-arm off break	Overseas player; Replacement player
44	Ross Whiteley	(England)	13 September 1988 (age 37)	Left-handed	Left-arm medium	
—	**Finn Allen**	(New Zealand)	22 April 1999 (age 26)	Right-handed	—	Overseas player
All Rounders
11	**Marcus Stoinis**	(Australia)	16 August 1989 (age 36)	Right-handed	Right-arm fast-medium	Overseas player; Ruled out
15	**George Garton**	(England)	15 April 1997 (age 28)	Left-handed	Left-arm fast	
26	James Fuller	(England)	24 January 1990 (age 35)	Right-handed	Right-arm fast-medium	Replacement player
Wicketkeepers
13	**Quinton de Kock**	(South Africa)	17 December 1992 (age 32)	Left-handed	—	Overseas player
17	Alex Davies	(England)	23 August 1994 (age 31)	Right-handed	—	
Pace bowlers
8	Sonny Baker	(England)	13 March 2003 (age 22)	Right-handed	Right-arm fast-medium	Replacement player
22	**Jofra Archer**	(England)	1 April 1995 (age 30)	Right-handed	Right-arm fast	Centrally Contracted player; Ruled out through injury
31	Michael Hogan	(Australia)	31 May 1981 (age 44)	Right-handed	Right-arm fast-medium	Wildcard player; UK passport
32	**Craig Overton**	(England)	10 April 1994 (age 31)	Right-handed	Right-arm fast-medium	
34	**Chris Jordan**	(England)	4 October 1988 (age 37)	Right-handed	Right-arm fast-medium	Ruled out through injury
56	**Tymal Mills**	(England)	12 August 1992 (age 33)	Right-handed	Left-arm fast	Ruled out through injury
—	**Beuran Hendricks**	(South Africa)	8 June 1990 (age 35)	Left-handed	Left-arm fast-medium	Overseas player; Replacement player
Spin bowlers
10	Rehan Ahmed	(England)	13 August 2004 (age 21)	Right-handed	Right-arm leg break	
21	Dan Moriarty	(South Africa)	12 February 1999 (age 26)	Left-handed	Slow left-arm orthodox	UK passport
23	Jake Lintott	(England)	22 April 1993 (age 32)	Right-handed	Slow left-arm unorthodox	

=== Women's side ===
- **Bold** denotes players with international caps.

S/N	Name	Nat.	Date of birth (age)	Batting style	Bowling style	Notes
Batters
1	Georgia Adams	(England)	4 October 1993 (age 32)	Right-handed	Right-arm off break	
8	Ella McCaughan	(England)	26 September 2002 (age 23)	Right-handed	Right-arm leg break	
16	**Maia Bouchier**	(England)	5 December 1998 (age 27)	Right-handed	Right-arm medium	
18	**Smriti Mandhana**	(India)	18 July 1996 (age 29)	Left-handed	Right-arm off break	Overseas player
28	**Danni Wyatt**	(England)	22 April 1991 (age 34)	Right-handed	Right-arm off break	Centrally Contracted player
47	**Sophia Dunkley**	(England)	16 July 1998 (age 27)	Right-handed	Right-arm leg break	
All Rounders
23	**Tahlia McGrath**	(Australia)	10 November 1995 (age 30)	Right-handed	Right-arm medium	Overseas player
73	Paige Scholfield	(England)	19 December 1995 (age 29)	Right-handed	Right-arm medium	
Wicketkeepers
59	Carla Rudd	(England)	30 December 1993 (age 31)	Right-handed	Right-arm medium	
Pace bowlers
6	**Freya Kemp**	(England)	21 April 2005 (age 20)	Left-handed	Left-arm medium	
14	**Lauren Bell**	(England)	2 January 2001 (age 24)	Right-handed	Right-arm fast-medium	
41	**Anya Shrubsole**	(England)	7 December 1991 (age 34)	Right-handed	Right-arm medium	Captain; Centrally Contracted player
46	**Tara Norris**	(United States)	4 June 1998 (age 27)	Left-handed	Left-arm medium	UK passport
Spin bowlers
5	**Molly Strano**	(Australia)	5 October 1992 (age 33)	Right-handed	Right-arm off break	Overseas player
10	**Amanda-Jade Wellington**	(Australia)	29 May 1997 (age 28)	Right-handed	Right-arm leg break	Overseas player
11	Jo Gardner	(England)	25 March 1997 (age 28)	Right-handed	Right-arm off break	

== Group fixtures ==
=== Fixtures (Men) ===
3 August 2022
19:00 (N)
Scorecard

Welsh Fire; 107/7 (100 balls)	v	Southern Brave (H); 109/1 (69 balls)
Ben Duckett 40 (31); Chris Jordan 2/16 (15 balls)		James Vince 71* (41); Jake Ball 1/25 (19 balls)

Southern Brave won by 9 wickets
Rose Bowl, Southampton
Umpires: Russell Warren (Eng) and Alex Wharf (Eng)
Player of the match: James Vince (Southern Brave)

- Southern Brave won the toss and elected to field.
- Points: Southern Brave 2, Welsh Fire 0.

10 August 2022
18:30 (N)
Scorecard

(H) Birmingham Phoenix; 176/4 (100 balls)	v	Southern Brave; 123 (85 balls)
Will Smeed 101* (50); Marcus Stoinis 1/12 (10 balls)		Alex Davies 33 (24); Henry Brookes 5/25 (20 balls)

Birmingham Phoenix won by 53 runs
Edgbaston, Birmingham
Umpires: Nick Cook (Eng) and Peter Hartley (Eng)
Player of the match: Will Smeed (Birmingham Phoenix)

- Southern Brave won the toss and elected to field.
- Points: Birmingham Phoenix 2, Southern Brave 0.

12 August 2022
18:30 (N)
Scorecard

London Spirit; 147/6 (100 balls)	v	Southern Brave (H); 138/7 (100 balls)
Daniel Bell-Drummond 46 (33); Michael Hogan 2/31 (20 balls)		Ross Whiteley 52 (33); Jordan Thompson 2/32 (20 balls)

London Spirit won by 9 runs
Rose Bowl, Southampton
Umpires: Nick Cook (Eng) and Ben Debenham (Eng)
Player of the match: Daniel Bell-Drummond (London Spirit)

- London Spirit won the toss and elected to bat.
- Points: London Spirit 2, Southern Brave 0.

14 August 2022
18:00 (N)
Scorecard

Southern Brave; 137/6 (100 balls)	v	Oval Invincibles (H); 142/3 (82 balls)
Marcus Stoinis 37 (27); Reece Topley 3/24 (20 balls)		Will Jacks 108* (48); James Fuller 1/22 (20 balls)

Oval Invincibles won by 7 wickets
The Oval, London
Umpires: David Millns (Eng) and Alex Wharf (Eng)
Player of the match: Will Jacks (Oval Invincibles)

- Oval Invincibles won the toss and elected to field.
- Points: Oval Invincibles 2, Southern Brave 0.

18 August 2022
19:00 (N)
Scorecard

Manchester Originals; 188/3 (100 balls)	v	Southern Brave (H); 120 (84 balls)
Jos Buttler 68 (42); Jake Lintott 1/28 (20 balls)		George Garton 25 (14); Paul Walter 3/20 (15 balls)

Manchester Originals won by 68 runs
Rose Bowl, Southampton
Umpires: Rob Bailey (Eng) and Martin Saggers (Eng)
Player of the match: Andre Russell (Manchester Originals)

- Southern Brave won the toss and elected to field.
- Points: Manchester Originals 2, Southern Brave 0.

22 August 2022
18:30 (N)
Scorecard

(H) Welsh Fire; 129/8 (100 balls)	v	Southern Brave; 132/1 (82 balls)
Leus du Plooy 37 (25); George Garton 3/7 (15 balls)		Paul Stirling 74* (42); Dwaine Pretorius 1/20 (20 balls)

Southern Brave won by 9 wickets
Sophia Gardens, Cardiff
Umpires: Ben Debenham (Eng) and Graham Lloyd (Eng)
Player of the match: George Garton (Southern Brave)

- Southern Brave won the toss and elected to field.
- Sonny Baker (Southern Brave) made his T20 debut.
- Points: Southern Brave 2, Welsh Fire 0.

25 August 2022
19:00 (N)
Scorecard

Trent Rockets; 138/6 (100 balls)	v	Southern Brave (H); 142/4 (95 balls)
Dawid Malan 59 (41); James Fuller 2/18 (20 balls)		Alex Davies 51* (43); Sam Cook 2/25 (20 balls)

Southern Brave won by 6 wickets
Rose Bowl, Southampton
Umpires: Billy Taylor (Eng) and Alex Wharf (Eng)
Player of the match: Alex Davies (Southern Brave)

- Southern Brave won the toss and elected to field.
- Points: Southern Brave 2, Trent Rockets 0.

31 August 2022
15:00
Scorecard

(H) Northern Superchargers; 135/8 (100 balls)	v	Southern Brave; 119/9 (100 balls)
Harry Brook 29 (17); Rehan Ahmed 2/20 (20 balls); James Fuller 2/20 (20 balls)		Rehan Ahmed 33 (29); Wayne Parnell 4/16 (20 balls)

Northern Superchargers won by 16 runs
Headingley, Leeds
Umpires: Neil Mallender (Eng) and Steve O'Shaughnessy (Eng)
Player of the match: Wayne Parnell (Northern Superchargers)

- Southern Brave won the toss and elected to field.
- Points: Northern Superchargers 2, Southern Brave 0.

=== Fixtures (Women) ===
Due to the shortened women's competition, Southern Brave didn't play against Birmingham Phoenix.

12 August 2022
15:00
Scorecard

London Spirit; 155/4 (100 balls)	v	Southern Brave (H); 159/4 (94 balls)
Beth Mooney 97* (55); Amanda-Jade Wellington 3/30 (20 balls)		Danni Wyatt 65 (34); Danielle Gibson 2/27 (20 balls)

Southern Brave won by 6 wickets
Rose Bowl, Southampton
Umpires: Tom Lungley (Eng) and Sue Redfern (Eng)
Player of the match: Danni Wyatt (Southern Brave)

- London Spirit won the toss and elected to bat.
- Points: Southern Brave 2, London Spirit 0.

14 August 2022
14:30
Scorecard

Southern Brave; 153/7 (100 balls)	v	Oval Invincibles (H); 141/7 (100 balls)
Smriti Mandhana 46 (25); Sophia Smale 2/12 (20 balls)		Lauren Winfield-Hill 25 (19); Danni Wyatt 2/16 (10 balls)

Southern Brave won by 12 runs
The Oval, London
Umpires: Sarah Bartlett (Eng) and Ben Debenham (Eng)
Player of the match: Georgia Adams (Southern Brave)

- Oval Invincibles won the toss and elected to field.
- Points: Southern Brave 2, Oval Invincibles 0.

18 August 2022
15:30
Scorecard

(H) Southern Brave; 136/5 (100 balls)	v	Manchester Originals; 127/8 (100 balls)
Smriti Mandhana 43 (25); Sophie Ecclestone 2/32 (20 balls)		Emma Lamb 57 (45); Amanda-Jade Wellington 3/27 (20 balls)

Southern Brave won by 9 runs
Rose Bowl, Southampton
Umpires: Hassan Adnan (Eng) and Jasmine Naeem (Eng)
Player of the match: Amanda-Jade Wellington (Southern Brave)

- Manchester Originals won the toss and elected to field.
- Points: Southern Brave 2, Manchester Originals 0.

22 August 2022
15:00
Scorecard

Southern Brave; 122/8 (100 balls)	v	Welsh Fire (H); 108 (99 balls)
Sophia Dunkley 49 (43); Hayley Matthews 2/26 (20 balls)		Sarah Bryce 28 (21); Anya Shrubsole 3/20 (19 balls)

Southern Brave won by 14 runs
Sophia Gardens, Cardiff
Umpires: Jasmine Naeem (Eng) and Mark Newell (Eng)
Player of the match: Sophia Dunkley (Southern Brave)

- Welsh Fire won the toss and elected to field.
- Points: Southern Brave 2, Welsh Fire 0.

25 August 2022
15:30
Scorecard

Trent Rockets; 88/8 (100 balls)	v	Southern Brave (H); 94/0 (56 balls)
Elyse Villani 25 (25); Lauren Bell 4/10 (20 balls)		Smriti Mandhana 57* (31)

Southern Brave won by 10 wickets
Rose Bowl, Southampton
Umpires: Sarah Bartlett (Eng) and Neil Pratt (Eng)
Player of the match: Lauren Bell (Southern Brave)

- Southern Brave won the toss and elected to field.
- Points: Southern Brave 2, Trent Rockets 0.

31 August 2022
11:30
Scorecard

(H) Northern Superchargers; 145/6 (100 balls)	v	Southern Brave; 125/9 (100 balls)
Laura Wolvaardt 50 (35); Amanda-Jade Wellington 3/17 (20 balls)		Sophia Dunkley 38 (30); Katie Levick 2/10 (20 balls)

Northern Superchargers won by 20 runs
Headingley, Leeds
Umpires: Hassan Adnan (Eng) and Sue Redfern (Eng)
Player of the match: Laura Wolvaardt (Northern Superchargers)

- Southern Brave won the toss and elected to field.
- Points: Northern Superchargers 2, Southern Brave 0.

== Standings ==
=== Women ===
Pos	Team	Pld	W	L	T	NR	Pts	NRR
1	Oval Invincibles (C)	6	5	1	0	0	10	1.098
2	Southern Brave	6	5	1	0	0	10	0.806
3	Trent Rockets	6	3	3	0	0	6	0.101
4	Birmingham Phoenix	6	3	3	0	0	6	−0.031
5	Northern Superchargers	6	3	3	0	0	6	−0.119
6	Manchester Originals	6	2	4	0	0	4	−0.478
7	London Spirit	6	2	4	0	0	4	−0.557
8	Welsh Fire	6	1	5	0	0	2	−0.681

Source: BBC Sport, ESPN Cricinfo
(C) Champions

advanced to Final
advanced to the Eliminator

=== Men ===
Pos	Team	Pld	W	L	T	NR	Pts	NRR
1	Trent Rockets (C)	8	6	2	0	0	12	0.576
2	Manchester Originals	8	5	3	0	0	10	0.908
3	London Spirit	8	5	3	0	0	10	0.338
4	Birmingham Phoenix	8	5	3	0	0	10	−0.172
5	Oval Invincibles	8	4	4	0	0	8	0.385
6	Northern Superchargers	8	4	4	0	0	8	0.009
7	Southern Brave	8	3	5	0	0	6	−0.593
8	Welsh Fire	8	0	8	0	0	0	−1.442

Source: BBC Sport, ESPN Cricinfo
(C) Champions

advanced to Final
advanced to the Eliminator

== Knockout stages ==
=== Women ===
==== Eliminator ====
2 September 2022
15:00
Scorecard

Southern Brave; 134/6 (100 balls)	v	Trent Rockets; 132/7 (100 balls)
Georgia Adams 38 (24); Bryony Smith 2/28 (15 balls)		Nat Sciver 72* (36); Georgia Adams 2/15 (15 balls)

Southern Brave won by 2 runs
Rose Bowl, Southampton
Umpires: Anna Harris (Eng) and Steve O'Shaughnessy (Eng)
Player of the match: Tahlia McGrath (Southern Brave)

- Trent Rockets won the toss and elected to field.

==== Final ====
3 September 2022
15:00
Scorecard

Southern Brave; 101/7 (100 balls)	v	Oval Invincibles; 105/5 (94 balls)
Sophia Dunkley 26 (23); Shabnim Ismail 2/12 (20 balls)		Marizanne Kapp 37* (33); Amanda-Jade Wellington 2/25 (20 balls)

Oval Invincibles won by 5 wickets
Lord's, London
Umpires: Ben Debenham (Eng) and Sue Redfern (Eng)
Player of the match: Marizanne Kapp (Oval Invincibles)

- Southern Brave won the toss and elected to bat.
