= 2021 Southern Brave season =

Southern Brave
2021 season
- Coach: (Sri Lanka) Mahela Jayawardene (Men's team) (England) Charlotte Edwards (Women's team)
- Captain: (England) James Vince (Men's team) (England) Anya Shrubsole (Women's team)
- Overseas player: (New Zealand) Devon Conway (Singapore) Tim David (New Zealand) Colin de Grandhomme (South Africa) Quinton de Kock (Ireland) Paul Stirling (Men's team) (Ireland) Gaby Lewis (India) Smriti Mandhana (Cricket West Indies) Stafanie Taylor (Australia) Amanda-Jade Wellington (Women's team)
- Ground(s): Ageas Bowl
- The Hundred (Men's): Winners
- The Hundred (Women's): 2nd
- Most runs: Sophia Dunkley: 244 (Women's team); James Vince: 229 (Men's team)
- Most wickets: AJ Wellington: 14 (Women's team); Jake Lintott: 11 (Men's team)
- Most catches: Alex Davies: 7 (Men's team); Maia Bouchier: 6 (Women's team)

The 2021 season was Southern Brave's first season of the new franchise 100 ball cricket, The Hundred. As a franchise, Southern Brave were the most successful in the 2021 season with both the men's and women's teams playing in the finals. The women's team eventually finished as runners-up while the men's team won their competition.

== Players ==
=== Men's side ===
- **Bold** denotes players with international caps.

S/N	Name	Nat.	Date of birth (age)	Batting style	Bowling style	Notes
Batsmen
14	**James Vince**	(England)	14 March 1991 (age 34)	Right-handed	Right-arm medium	Captain; Local Icon player
39	**Paul Stirling**	(Ireland)	3 September 1990 (age 35)	Left-handed	Right-arm off break	Overseas player; Replacement player
44	Ross Whiteley	(England)	13 September 1988 (age 37)	Left-handed	Left-arm medium	
88	**Devon Conway**	(New Zealand)	8 July 1991 (age 34)	Left-handed	Right-arm medium	Overseas player
97	**Delray Rawlins**	(Bermuda)	14 September 1997 (age 28)	Left-handed	Slow left-arm orthodox	
All Rounders
8	**Liam Dawson**	(England)	1 March 1990 (age 35)	Right-handed	Slow left-arm orthodox	Local Icon player
15	George Garton	(England)	15 April 1997 (age 28)	Left-handed	Left-arm fast	
16	**Tim David**	(Singapore)	16 March 1996 (age 29)	Right-handed	Right-arm off break	Overseas player; Replacement player
77	**Colin de Grandhomme**	(New Zealand)	22 July 1986 (age 39)	Right-handed	Right-arm fast-medium	Overseas player
Wicketkeepers
13	**Quinton de Kock**	(South Africa)	17 December 1992 (age 33)	Left-handed	—	Overseas player
17	Alex Davies	(England)	23 August 1994 (age 31)	Right-handed	—	
Pace bowlers
22	**Jofra Archer**	(England)	1 April 1995 (age 30)	Right-handed	Right-arm fast	Centrally Contracted player
32	**Craig Overton**	(England)	10 April 1994 (age 31)	Right-handed	Right-arm fast-medium	
34	**Chris Jordan**	(England)	4 October 1988 (age 37)	Right-handed	Right-arm fast-medium	Local Icon player
37	Gus Atkinson	(England)	19 January 1998 (age 28)	Right-handed	Right-arm fast-medium	Replacement player
56	**Tymal Mills**	(England)	12 August 1992 (age 33)	Right-handed	Left-arm fast	
Spin bowlers
7	Max Waller	(England)	3 March 1988 (age 37)	Right-handed	Right-arm leg break	
19	**Danny Briggs**	(England)	30 April 1991 (age 34)	Right-handed	Slow left-arm orthodox	
23	Jake Lintott	(England)	22 April 1993 (age 32)	Right-handed	Slow left-arm unorthodox	Wildcard pick
—	Archie Lenham	(England)	23 July 2004 (age 21)	Right-handed	Right-arm leg break	Replacement player

=== Women's side ===
- **Bold** denotes players with international caps.

S/N	Name	Nat.	Date of birth (age)	Batting style	Bowling style	Notes
Batters
16	Maia Bouchier	(England)	5 December 1998 (age 27)	Right-handed	Right-arm medium	
18	**Smriti Mandhana**	(India)	18 July 1996 (age 29)	Left-handed	Right-arm off break	Overseas player
28	**Danni Wyatt**	(England)	22 April 1991 (age 34)	Right-handed	Right-arm off break	Centrally Contracted player
—	Ella McCaughan	(England)	26 September 2002 (age 23)	Right-handed	Right-arm leg break	
All Rounders
7	**Stafanie Taylor**	(Cricket West Indies)	11 June 1991 (age 34)	Right-handed	Right-arm off break	Marquee player; Overseas player
47	**Sophia Dunkley**	(England)	16 July 1998 (age 27)	Right-handed	Right-arm leg break	
66	**Gaby Lewis**	(Ireland)	27 March 2001 (age 24)	Right-handed	Right-arm leg break	Overseas player; Replacement player
—	Paige Scholfield	(England)	19 December 1995 (age 30)	Right-handed	Right-arm medium	
Wicketkeepers
59	Carla Rudd	(England)	30 December 1993 (age 32)	Right-handed	Right-arm medium	
Pace bowlers
14	Lauren Bell	(England)	2 January 2001 (age 25)	Right-handed	Right-arm fast-medium	
41	**Anya Shrubsole**	(England)	7 December 1991 (age 34)	Right-handed	Right-arm medium	Captain; Centrally Contracted player
46	Tara Norris	(England)	4 June 1998 (age 27)	Left-handed	Left-arm medium	
—	**Sonia Odedra**	(England)	3 June 1988 (age 37)	Right-handed	Right-arm medium	
Spin bowlers
10	**Amanda-Jade Wellington**	(Australia)	29 May 1997 (age 28)	Right-handed	Right-arm leg break	Overseas player
26	Charlotte Taylor	(England)	2 February 1994 (age 32)	Right-handed	Right-arm off break	
88	Fi Morris	(England)	31 January 1994 (age 32)	Right-handed	Right-arm off break	

== Regular season ==
=== Fixtures (Men) ===
==== July ====
24 July 2021
14:30
Scorecard

Southern Brave; 126/8 (100 balls)	v	Trent Rockets (H); 127/1 (82 balls)
Ross Whiteley 39* (29); Marchant de Lange 5/20 (20 balls)		Dawid Malan 62* (43); George Garton 1/29 (15 balls)

Trent Rockets won by 9 wickets
Trent Bridge, Nottingham
Attendance: 12,783
Umpires: David Millns and Russell Warren
Player of the match: Marchant de Lange (Trent Rockets)

- Southern Brave won the toss and elected to bat.
- Points: Trent Rockets 2, Southern Brave 0.

27 July 2021
18:30 (N)
Scorecard

(H) Welsh Fire; 165/4 (100 balls)	v	Southern Brave; 147/7 (100 balls)
Jonny Bairstow 72 (39); Danny Briggs 2/33 (15 balls)		James Vince 40 (27); James Neesham 3/5 (15 balls)

Welsh Fire won by 18 runs
Sophia Gardens, Cardiff
Attendance: 3,021
Umpires: Rob Bailey and Nigel Llong
Player of the match: Jonny Bairstow (Welsh Fire)

- Southern Brave won the toss and elected to field.
- Points: Welsh Fire 2, Southern Brave 0.

30 July 2021
18:30 (N)
Scorecard

Birmingham Phoenix; 151/3 (100 balls)	v	Southern Brave (H); 152/6 (97 balls)
Liam Livingstone 68* (44); Jake Lintott 2/13 (15 balls)		James Vince 60 (38); Adam Milne 3/15 (20 balls)

Southern Brave won by 4 wickets
Rose Bowl, Southampton
Umpires: David Millns and Martin Saggers
Player of the match: James Vince (Southern Brave)

- Southern Brave won the toss and elected to field.
- Points: Southern Brave 2, Birmingham Phoenix 0.

==== August ====
1 August 2021
18:00 (N)
Scorecard

Southern Brave; 145/6 (100 balls)	v	London Spirit (H); 141/7 (100 balls)
Alex Davies 50 (40); Blake Cullen 2/27 (20 balls)		Josh Inglis 55 (43); George Garton 2/30 (20 balls)

Southern Brave won by 4 runs
Lord's, London
Umpires: Graham Lloyd and Russell Warren
Player of the match: Chris Jordan (Southern Brave)

- London Spirit won the toss and elected to field.
- Points: Southern Brave 2, London Spirit 0.

5 August 2021
19:00 (N)
Scorecard

(H) Manchester Originals; 98/3 (71 balls)	v	Southern Brave
Colin Munro 41* (28); Tymal Mills 1/9 (11 balls)

No result
Old Trafford, Manchester
Umpires: Steve O'Shaughnessy and Tim Robinson

- Southern Brave won the toss and elected to field.
- No further play was possible due to rain.
- Points: Manchester Originals 1, Southern Brave 1.

7 August 2021
19:00 (N)
Scorecard

Northern Superchargers; 128/6 (100 balls)	v	Southern Brave (H); 131/5 (95 balls)
Dane Vilas 35* (24); Danny Briggs 2/28 (20 balls)		Quinton de Kock 72* (45); Adil Rashid 2/19 (20 balls)

Southern Brave won by 5 wickets
Rose Bowl, Southampton
Umpires: Graham Lloyd and Tim Robinson
Player of the match: Quinton de Kock (Southern Brave)

- Northern Superchargers won the toss and elected to bat.
- Points: Southern Brave 2, Northern Superchargers 0.

11 August 2021
18:30 (N)
Scorecard

Welsh Fire; 144/5 (100 balls)	v	Southern Brave (H); 147/2 (87 balls)
Tom Banton 36 (20); Danny Briggs 2/17 (20 balls)		Quinton de Kock 57* (32); Luke Fletcher 1/24 (15 balls)

Southern Brave won by 8 wickets
Rose Bowl, Southampton
Umpires: David Millns and Russell Warren
Player of the match: Quinton de Kock (Southern Brave)

- Southern Brave won the toss and elected to field.
- Points: Southern Brave 2, Welsh Fire 0.

16 August 2021
19:00 (N)
Scorecard

Oval Invincibles; 134/7 (100 balls)	v	Southern Brave (H); 135/4 (95 balls)
Alex Blake 44* (28); Jake Lintott 3/14 (20 balls)		Colin de Grandhomme 40* (28); Tom Curran 1/8 (15 balls)

Southern Brave won by 6 wickets
Rose Bowl, Southampton
Umpires: Rob Bailey and Martin Saggers
Player of the match: Alex Davies (Southern Brave)

- Southern Brave won the toss and elected to field.
- Points: Southern Brave 2, Oval Invincibles 0.

=== Fixtures (Women) ===
==== July ====
24 July 2021
11:00
Scorecard

Southern Brave; 133/5 (100 balls)	v	Trent Rockets (H); 110/7 (100 balls)
Stafanie Taylor 45* (31); Nat Sciver 2/33 (20 balls)		Nat Sciver 44 (29); Anya Shrubsole 4/13 (20 balls)

Southern Brave won by 23 runs
Trent Bridge, Nottingham
Umpires: Nick Cook and Sue Redfern
Player of the match: Stafanie Taylor (Southern Brave)

- Trent Rockets won the toss and elected to field.
- Points: Southern Brave 2, Trent Rockets 0.

27 July 2021
15:00
Scorecard

(H) Welsh Fire; 110/7 (100 balls)	v	Southern Brave; 112/2 (84 balls)
Hayley Matthews 33 (20); Lauren Bell 2/19 (20 balls); Amanda-Jade Wellington 2/19 (20 balls)		Smriti Mandhana 61* (39); Nicole Harvey 1/23 (15 balls)

Southern Brave won by 8 wickets
Sophia Gardens, Cardiff
Umpires: Jasmine Naeem and Alex Wharf
Player of the match: Smriti Mandhana (Southern Brave)

- Southern Brave won the toss and elected to field.
- Points: Southern Brave 2, Welsh Fire 0.

30 July 2021
15:00
Scorecard

Birmingham Phoenix; 140/4 (100 balls)	v	Southern Brave (H); 141/2 (82 balls)
Amy Jones 42* (26); Amanda-Jade Wellington 2/16 (20 balls)		Danni Wyatt 69* (40); Erin Burns 1/28 (15 balls)

Southern Brave won by 8 wickets
Rose Bowl, Southampton
Umpires: Jasmine Naeem and Russell Warren
Player of the match: Danni Wyatt (Southern Brave)

- Southern Brave won the toss and elected to field.
- Points: Southern Brave 2, Birmingham Phoenix 0.

==== August ====
1 August 2021
14:30
Scorecard

(H) London Spirit; 93 (96 balls)	v	Southern Brave; 97/3 (92 balls)
Tammy Beaumont 34 (45); Amanda-Jade Wellington 4/14 (20 balls)		Stafanie Taylor 29* (32); Deepti Sharma 2/10 (20 balls)

Southern Brave won by 7 wickets
Lord's, London
Umpires: Sarah Bartlett and Peter Hartley
Player of the match: Amanda-Jade Wellington (Southern Brave)

- Southern Brave won the toss and elected to field.
- Points: Southern Brave 2, London Spirit 0.

5 August 2021
15:30
Scorecard

Southern Brave; 123/7 (100 balls)	v	Manchester Originals (H); 97/1 (70 balls)
Sophia Dunkley 28 (25); Hannah Jones 3/17 (20 overs)		Lizelle Lee 43* (32)

Manchester Originals won by 17 runs (DLS Method)
Old Trafford, Manchester
Umpires: Anna Harris and Alex Wharf
Player of the match: Lizelle Lee (Manchester Originals)

- Manchester Originals won the toss and elected to field.
- No further play was possible due to rain. Manchester Originals were 17 runs ahead of the DLS par score of 80 runs from 70 balls.
- Points: Manchester Originals 2, Southern Brave 0.

7 August 2021
15:30
Scorecard

Northern Superchargers; 76/3 (73 balls)	v	Southern Brave (H); 89/3 (62 balls)
Laura Wolvaardt 21* (22); Lauren Bell 2/19 (15 balls)		Sophia Dunkley 50* (28); Kalea Moore 2/9 (15 balls)

Southern Brave won by 7 wickets (DLS Method)
Rose Bowl, Southampton
Umpires: Nick Cook and Anna Harris
Player of the match: Sophia Dunkley (Southern Brave)

- Southern Brave won the toss and elected to field.
- Rain stopped play during Northern Superchargers innings. Southern Brave were set a revised target of 89 runs from 75 balls.
- Points: Southern Brave 2, Northern Superchargers 0.

11 August 2021
15:00
Scorecard

(H) Southern Brave; 166/3 (100 balls)	v	Welsh Fire; 127/4 (100 balls)
Smriti Mandhana 78 (52); Hayley Matthews 2/27 (20 balls)		Georgia Redmayne 35* (27); Danni Wyatt 1/10 (5 balls)

Southern Brave won by 39 runs
Rose Bowl, Southampton
Umpires: Graham Lloyd and Jasmine Naeem
Player of the match: Smriti Mandhana (Southern Brave)

- Welsh Fire won the toss and elected to field.
- Points: Southern Brave 2, Welsh Fire 0.

16 August 2021
15:30
Scorecard

(H) Southern Brave; 115/3 (100 balls)	v	Oval Invincibles; 85 (94 balls)
Sophia Dunkley 58* (39); Tash Farrant 2/22 (20 balls)		Dane van Niekerk 31 (32); Amanda-Jade Wellington 4/12 (20 balls)

Southern Brave won by 30 runs
Rose Bowl, Southampton
Umpires: Nick Cook and Jasmine Naeem
Player of the match: Sophia Dunkley (Southern Brave)

- Oval Invincibles won the toss and elected to field.
- Points: Southern Brave 2, Oval Invincibles 0.

== Standings ==
=== Men ===
Pos	Team	Pld	W	L	T	NR	Pts	NRR
1	Birmingham Phoenix	8	6	2	0	0	12	1.087
2	Southern Brave	8	5	2	0	1	11	0.034
3	Trent Rockets	8	5	3	0	0	10	0.035
4	Oval Invincibles	8	4	3	0	1	9	0.123
5	Northern Superchargers	8	3	4	0	1	7	0.510
6	Manchester Originals	8	2	4	0	2	6	−0.361
7	Welsh Fire	8	3	5	0	0	6	−0.827
8	London Spirit	8	1	6	0	1	3	−0.641

Source: ESPN Cricinfo, Sky Sports

advances to the Final
advances to the Eliminator

=== Women ===
Pos	Team	Pld	W	L	T	NR	Pts	NRR
1	Southern Brave	8	7	1	0	0	14	1.056
2	Oval Invincibles	8	4	3	0	1	9	0.015
3	Birmingham Phoenix	8	4	4	0	0	8	0.186
4	London Spirit	8	4	4	0	0	8	0.046
5	Manchester Originals	8	3	4	0	1	7	0.016
6	Northern Superchargers	8	3	4	0	1	7	−0.041
7	Trent Rockets	8	3	4	0	1	7	−0.293
8	Welsh Fire	8	2	6	0	0	4	−1.017

Source: ESPN Cricinfo, Sky Sports

advances to the Final
advances to the Eliminator

== Knockout stages ==
=== Men ===
==== Eliminator ====
20 August 2021
18:30 (D/N)
Scorecard

Trent Rockets; 96 (91 balls)	v	Southern Brave; 97/3 (68 balls)
Samit Patel 20 (21); Tymal Mills 3/8 (16 balls)		James Vince 45* (27); Marchant de Lange 2/16 (20 balls)

Southern Brave won by 7 wickets
The Oval, London
Umpires: David Millns and Russell Warren
Player of the match: George Garton (Southern Brave)

- Southern Brave won the toss and elected to field.

==== Final ====
21 August 2021
18:30 (D/N)
Scorecard

Southern Brave; 168/5 (100 balls)	v	Birmingham Phoenix; 136/5 (100 balls)
Paul Stirling 61 (36); Adam Milne 2/8 (20 balls)		Liam Livingstone 46 (19); Tymal Mills 1/13 (20 balls)

Southern Brave won by 32 runs
Lord's, London
Umpires: Martin Saggers and Alex Wharf
Player of the match: Paul Stirling (Southern Brave)

- Birmingham Phoenix won the toss and elected to field.

=== Women ===
==== Final ====
21 August 2021
15:00
Scorecard

Oval Invincibles; 121/6 (100 balls)	v	Southern Brave; 73 (98 balls)
Marizanne Kapp 26 (14); Anya Shrubsole 2/16 (20 balls)		Fi Morris 23 (26); Marizanne Kapp 4/9 (18 balls)

Oval Invincibles won by 48 runs
Lord's, London
Umpires: Steve O'Shaughnessy and Sue Redfern
Player of the match: Marizanne Kapp (Oval Invincibles)

- Southern Brave won the toss and elected to field.
