= 2024 Southern Brave season =

Cricket team season

Southern Brave
2024 season
- Coach: Charlotte Edwards (women); Stephen Fleming (men)
- Captain: Georgia Adams (women); James Vince (men)
- Overseas player: Lauren Cheatle; Charli Knott; Smriti Mandhana; Chloe Tryon; (women); Finn Allen; Akeal Hosein; Kieron Pollard; (men)
- Ground(s): Ageas Bowl

The 2024 season was the Southern Brave's 4th season of the 100 ball franchise cricket, The Hundred.

== Players ==
- **Bold** denotes players with international caps.

=== Women's side ===
S/N	Name	Nat.	Date of birth (age)	Batting style	Bowling style	Notes
Batters
16	**Maia Bouchier**	England	5 December 1998 (age 27)	Right-handed	Right-arm medium	
18	**Smriti Mandhana**	India	18 July 1997 (age 29)	Left-handed	Right-arm off break	Overseas player
28	**Danni Wyatt**	England	22 April 1991 (age 35)	Right-handed	Right-arm off break	
36	Sophie Luff	England	6 December 1993 (age 32)	Right-handed	Right-arm medium	Wildcard player
All-rounders
1	Georgia Adams	England	4 October 1993 (age 32)	Right-handed	Right-arm off break	Captain
6	**Freya Kemp**	England	21 April 2005 (age 21)	Left-handed	Left-arm medium	
11	Naomi Dattani	England	28 April 1994 (age 32)	Left-handed	Left-arm medium	
25	**Chloe Tryon**	South Africa	25 January 1994 (age 32)	Right-handed	Slow left-arm orthodox	Overseas player
88	Charli Knott	Australia	29 November 2002 (age 23)	Right-handed	Right-arm off break	Overseas player; Replacement player
Wicket-keepers
8	Katie Jones	England	28 December 2005 (age 20)	Right-handed	—	Wildcard player
17	Rhianna Southby	England	16 October 2000 (age 25)	Right-handed	—	
Pace bowlers
5	**Lauren Cheatle**	Australia	6 November 1998 (age 27)	Left-handed	Left-arm medium	Overseas player
7	Mary Taylor	England	7 October 2004 (age 21)	Right-handed	Right-arm medium	
63	**Lauren Bell**	England	2 January 2001 (age 25)	Right-handed	Right-arm fast-medium	
Spin bowlers
9	Kalea Moore	England	27 March 2003 (age 23)	Right-handed	Right-arm off break	
21	Tilly Corteen-Coleman	England	23 August 2007 (age 19)	Left-handed	Slow left-arm orthodox	

==== Men's side ====
S/N	Name	Nat.	Date of birth (age)	Batting style	Bowling style	Notes
Batters
5	Joe Weatherley	England	19 January 1997 (age 29)	Right-handed	Right-arm off break	Wildcard player
14	**James Vince**	England	14 March 1991 (age 35)	Right-handed	Right-arm medium	Captain
16	Daniel Hughes	Australia	16 February 1989 (age 37)	Left-handed	Right-arm medium	Overseas player; Replacement player
23	Laurie Evans	England	12 October 1987 (age 38)	Right-handed	Right-arm off break	
46	**Finn Allen**	New Zealand	22 April 1999 (age 27)	Right-handed	—	Overseas player; Ruled out through injury
76	Leus du Plooy	South Africa	12 January 1995 (age 31)	Left-handed	Slow left-arm orthodox	EU passport
All-rounders
15	**George Garton**	England	15 April 1997 (age 29)	Left-handed	Left-arm fast	
30	James Coles	England	2 April 2004 (age 22)	Right-handed	Slow left-arm orthodox	Wildcard player
55	**Kieron Pollard**	West Indies	12 May 1987 (age 39)	Right-handed	Right-arm fast-medium	Overseas player
Wicket-keepers
17	Alex Davies	England	23 August 1994 (age 32)	Right-handed	—	
72	**Andre Fletcher**	West Indies	28 November 1987 (age 38)	Right-handed	—	Overseas player; Replacement player
Pace bowlers
22	**Jofra Archer**	England	1 April 1995 (age 31)	Right-handed	Right-arm fast	Centrally contracted player
32	**Craig Overton**	England	10 April 1994 (age 32)	Right-handed	Right-arm fast-medium	
34	**Chris Jordan**	England	4 October 1988 (age 37)	Right-handed	Right-arm fast-medium	
56	**Tymal Mills**	England	12 August 1992 (age 34)	Right-handed	Left-arm fast	
Spin bowlers
7	**Akeal Hosein**	West Indies	25 April 1993 (age 33)	Left-handed	Slow left-arm orthodox	Overseas player
10	**Rehan Ahmed**	England	13 August 2004 (age 22)	Right-handed	Right-arm leg break	
19	**Danny Briggs**	England	30 April 1991 (age 35)	Right-handed	Slow left-arm orthodox	

== Standings ==
=== Women ===
Pos	Team	Pld	W	L	T	NR	Pts	NRR	Qualification
1	Welsh Fire	8	5	2	0	1	11	0.334	Advanced to the Final
2	Oval Invincibles	8	5	2	1	0	11	0.034	Advanced to the Eliminator
3	London Spirit	8	4	3	1	0	9	0.080	Advanced to the Eliminator
4	Northern Superchargers	8	3	3	1	1	8	0.942	
5	Trent Rockets	8	4	4	0	0	8	0.407	
6	Manchester Originals	8	3	4	0	1	7	−0.398	
7	Birmingham Phoenix	8	3	4	0	1	7	−0.742	
8	Southern Brave	8	1	6	1	0	3	−0.675	

Source: ESPNcricinfo

=== Men ===
Pos	Team	Pld	W	L	T	NR	Pts	NRR	Qualification
1	Oval Invincibles	8	6	2	0	0	12	0.893	Advanced to the Final
2	Birmingham Phoenix	8	6	2	0	0	12	0.402	Advanced to the Eliminator
3	Southern Brave	8	5	2	0	1	11	0.595	Advanced to the Eliminator
4	Northern Superchargers	8	5	2	0	1	11	−0.453	
5	Trent Rockets	8	4	4	0	0	8	0.348	
6	Welsh Fire	8	2	4	0	2	6	−0.215	
7	Manchester Originals	8	1	7	0	0	2	−0.886	
8	London Spirit	8	1	7	0	0	2	−0.975	

Source: ESPN Cricinfo
