= 2022 The Hundred season =

Second season of The Hundred

- Dates: 3 August – 3 September 2022
- Administrator: England and Wales Cricket Board
- Cricket format: 100-ball cricket
- Tournament format(s): Group stage and knockout
- Champions: W: Oval Invincibles (2nd title); M: Trent Rockets (1st title)
- Participants: W: 8 M: 8
- Matches: 60; W: 26; M: 34
- Player of the series: W: Nat Sciver (Trent Rockets); M: Adam Lyth (Northern Superchargers)
- Most runs: W: Laura Wolvaardt (Northern Superchargers) (286); M: Dawid Malan (Trent Rockets) (377)
- Most wickets: W: Amanda-Jade Wellington (Southern Brave) (17); M: Three players (14) (Note: Paul Walter, Tom Helm and Jordan Thompson all took 14 wickets in the men's competition.)
- Official website: The Hundred

The 2022 The Hundred season was the second season of The Hundred, a professional franchise 100-ball cricket tournament involving eight men's and women's teams located in major cities across United Kingdom.

The women's Oval Invincibles defended their 2021 title, while the men's Trent Rockets won the trophy for the first time.

== Teams and venues ==
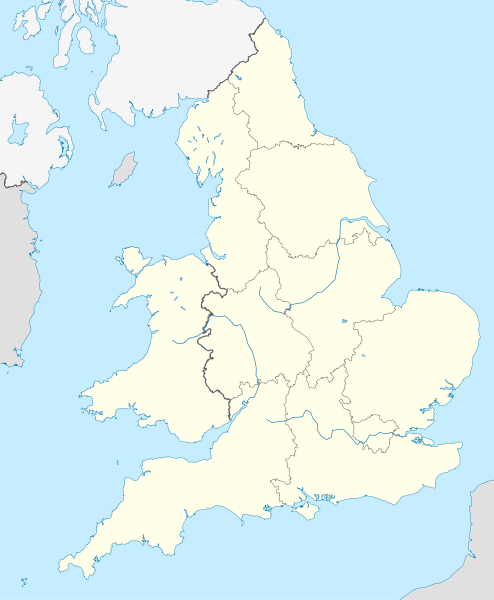
Venues in England and Wales

The eight teams that competed in the 2021 season returned for a second year.

Team	Venue	Women's Coach	Men's Coach
Birmingham Phoenix	Edgbaston, Birmingham	Ben Sawyer	Daniel Vettori
London Spirit	Lord's, London	Trevor Griffin	Trevor Bayliss
Manchester Originals	Old Trafford, Manchester	Paul Shaw	Simon Katich
Northern Superchargers	Headingley, Leeds	Danielle Hazell	James Foster
Oval Invincibles	The Oval, London	Jonathan Batty	Tom Moody
Southern Brave	Rose Bowl, Southampton	Charlotte Edwards	Mahela Jayawardene
Trent Rockets	Trent Bridge, Nottingham	Salliann Beams	Andy Flower
Welsh Fire (Welsh: Tân Cymreig)	Sophia Gardens, Cardiff	Gareth Breese	Gary Kirsten

== Background ==
=== Match schedule ===
The majority of the men's and women's matches were held on the same day at the same grounds, with a single ticket giving access to both contests. Each men's team played four matches at home and four away, facing every other team once, plus a bonus match against their nearest regional rival.

The women's competition in 2022 was affected by the 2022 Commonwealth Games in Birmingham, which reduced the availability of players at the start of the tournament. As a result, the women's tournament began a week later, and each team played only six group-stage matches, meaning some teams did not meet each other.

=== Knockout stage ===
Once the league stage was completed, the top three teams advanced to the knockout stage. The second- and third-placed teams contested a semi-final at the Rose Bowl in Southampton, with the winner facing the first-placed team in the final at Lord's.

Semifinal	Final
	First-placed team
Second-placed team	Winner of semi-final
Third-placed team

=== Inaugural season impact ===
The inaugural 2021 The Hundred season was affected by the COVID-19 pandemic but sold over 500,000 tickets and was seen as a significant boost for women's cricket.

With the easing of pandemic restrictions, more overseas players were expected to participate in the second season.

=== Player salaries ===
Player salaries were also increased for the 2022 season. Male players received a 25% raise, with each team allowed up to £1 million for wages, while female players’ salaries more than doubled to £250,000 per side.

== Draft and retention ==
=== Women ===
Women's teams were allowed to retain an unlimited number of players from the previous season. The teams chose to retain between five and twelve players. The remaining places were filled during the Women's Selection Process and the Overseas Wildcard Draft.

Price	Birmingham Phoenix	London Spirit	Manchester Originals	Northern Superchargers	Oval Invincibles	Southern Brave	Trent Rockets	Welsh Fire
£31.25k	Amy Jones	Chloe Brewer	Sophie Ecclestone	Gaby Lewis	Dane van Niekerk	Danni Wyatt	Nat Sciver	Tammy Beaumont
£31.25k	Sophie Devine	Beth Mooney	Lizelle Lee	Alyssa Healy	Marizanne Kapp	Smriti Mandhana	Kim Garth	Rachael Haynes
£25k	Ellyse Perry	Amelia Kerr	Kate Cross	Laura Wolvaardt	Kirstie White	Sophia Dunkley	Katherine Brunt	Annabel Sutherland
£25k	Sophie Molineux	Megan Schutt	Deandra Dottin*	Jenny Gunn	Shabnim Ismail	Anya Shrubsole	Mignon du Preez	Fran Wilson
£18.75k	Georgia Elwiss	Freya Davies	Emma Lamb	Linsey Smith	Mady Villiers	Amanda-Jade Wellington	Sarah Glenn	Katie George
£18.75k	Kirstie Gordon	Sophie Luff	Amy Satterthwaite	Alice Davidson-Richards	Lauren Winfield-Hill	Tahlia McGrath	Bryony Smith	Hayley Matthews*
£15k	Issy Wong	Charlie Dean	Ellie Threlkeld	Hollie Armitage	Aylish Cranstone	Maia Bouchier	Kathryn Bryce	Claire Nicholas
£15k	Eve Jones	Danielle Gibson	Cordelia Griffith	Beth Langston	Alice Capsey	Lauren Bell	Alana King	Alex Hartley
£12.5k	Emily Arlott	Amara Carr	Hannah Jones	Katie Levick	Danielle Gregory	Carla Rudd	Abbey Freeborn	Georgia Hennessy
£12.5k	Gwen Davies	Naomi Dattani	Ami Campbell	Bess Heath	Grace Gibbs	Georgia Adams	Marie Kelly	Fi Morris
£10k	Abtaha Maqsood	Grace Scrivens	Georgie Boyce	Kalea Moore	Eva Gray	Tara Norris	Sophie Munro	Alex Griffiths
£10k	Davina Perrin	Natasha Wraith	Phoebe Graham	Liz Russell	Emily Windsor	Jo Gardner	Alexa Stonehouse	Sarah Bryce
£7.5k	Ria Fackrell	Alice Monaghan	Laura Jackson	Lucy Higham	Sophia Smale	Paige Scholfield	Georgia Davis	Hannah Baker
£7.5k	Phoebe Franklin	Grace Ballinger	Grace Potts	Bethany Harmer	Kira Chathli	Freya Kemp	Ella Claridge	Lauren Filer
£7.5k	Sterre Kalis	Nancy Harman	Mahika Gaur	Rachel Slater	Ryana MacDonald-Gay	Ella McCaughan	Emma Marlow	Nicole Harvey
Wildcard	Deepti Sharma	Jess Kerr	Lea Tahuhu	Heather Graham	Suzie Bates	Molly Strano	Elyse Villani	Nicola Carey
Replacement			*Erin Burns					*Maddy Green

=== Men ===
Men's teams were allowed to retain up to ten players from the previous season by negotiating new contracts directly with players until the retention window closed.

A player draft then took place in May to fill the forty-two remaining squad players, with teams taking turns to sign available players in vacant salary bands. Picks were in reverse order of where a team finished in the previous season.

Price	Birmingham Phoenix	London Spirit	Manchester Originals	Northern Superchargers	Oval Invincibles	Southern Brave	Trent Rockets	Welsh Fire
Central	Chris Woakes	Zak Crawley	Jos Buttler	Ben Stokes	Sam Curran	Jofra Archer	Joe Root	Jonny Bairstow
Central	Jack Leach	Mark Wood	Ollie Robinson		Rory Burns		Dawid Malan	Ollie Pope
£125k	Matthew Wade	Kieron Pollard	Andre Russell	Dwayne Bravo	Sunil Narine	Quinton de Kock	Tom Kohler-Cadmore	Joe Clarke
£125k	Liam Livingstone	Liam Dawson	Laurie Evans	Adil Rashid	Jason Roy	Marcus Stoinis	Rashid Khan	Tom Banton
£100k	Olly Stone	Glenn Maxwell	Wanindu Hasaranga	David Willey	Sam Billings	James Vince	Alex Hales	Adam Zampa
£100k	Moeen Ali	Eoin Morgan	Phil Salt	Faf du Plessis	Tom Curran	Tymal Mills	Lewis Gregory	Ben Duckett
£75k	Adam Milne	Riley Meredith	Daniel Worrall	Wahab Riaz	Will Jacks	Chris Jordan	Colin Munro	David Miller
£75k	Benny Howell	Jordan Thompson	Matt Parkinson	Harry Brook	Saqib Mahmood	George Garton	Ian Cockbain	Jake Ball
£60k	Kane Richardson	Mason Crane	Sean Abbott	Adam Hose	Rilee Rossouw	Alex Davies	Marchant de Lange	Naseem Shah
£60k	Tom Abell	Dan Lawrence	Jamie Overton	Brydon Carse	Reece Topley	Jake Lintott	Luke Wood	David Payne
£50k	Matthew Fisher	Daniel Bell-Drummond	Tom Hartley	Matthew Potts	Danny Briggs	Rehan Ahmed	Samit Patel	Sam Hain
£50k	Will Smeed	Chris Wood	Tom Lammonby	John Simpson	Hilton Cartwright	Tim David	Matt Carter	Leus du Plooy
£40k	Chris Benjamin	Adam Rossington	Colin Ackermann	Roelof van der Merwe	Matt Milnes	Ross Whiteley	Steven Mullaney	Ryan Higgins
£40k	Miles Hammond	Ravi Bopara	Wayne Madsen	Adam Lyth	Jack Leaning	Craig Overton	Sam Cook	Matt Critchley
£30k	Graeme van Buuren	Blake Cullen	Fred Klaassen	Luke Wright	Jordan Cox	Joe Weatherley	Luke Fletcher	Jacob Bethell
£30k	Henry Brookes	Brad Wheal	Calvin Harrison	Callum Parkinson	Nathan Sowter	Dan Moriarty	Tom Moores	Josh Cobb

== Broadcasting ==
Sky Sports showed every match in the competition live on its subscription television service, while the BBC also broadcast some matches live on free-to-air television and broadcast commentary on its radio services. Some of the games shown on Sky were simulcast on YouTube and TikTok.

== Standings ==
=== Women ===
Pos	Team	Pld	W	L	T	NR	Pts	NRR
1	Oval Invincibles (C)	6	5	1	0	0	10	1.098
2	Southern Brave	6	5	1	0	0	10	0.806
3	Trent Rockets	6	3	3	0	0	6	0.101
4	Birmingham Phoenix	6	3	3	0	0	6	−0.031
5	Northern Superchargers	6	3	3	0	0	6	−0.119
6	Manchester Originals	6	2	4	0	0	4	−0.478
7	London Spirit	6	2	4	0	0	4	−0.557
8	Welsh Fire	6	1	5	0	0	2	−0.681

Source: BBC Sport, ESPN Cricinfo
(C) Champions

advanced to Final
advanced to the Eliminator

=== Men ===
Pos	Team	Pld	W	L	T	NR	Pts	NRR
1	Trent Rockets (C)	8	6	2	0	0	12	0.576
2	Manchester Originals	8	5	3	0	0	10	0.908
3	London Spirit	8	5	3	0	0	10	0.338
4	Birmingham Phoenix	8	5	3	0	0	10	−0.172
5	Oval Invincibles	8	4	4	0	0	8	0.385
6	Northern Superchargers	8	4	4	0	0	8	0.009
7	Southern Brave	8	3	5	0	0	6	−0.593
8	Welsh Fire	8	0	8	0	0	0	−1.442

Source: BBC Sport, ESPN Cricinfo
(C) Champions

advanced to Final
advanced to the Eliminator

== Results ==
=== Women ===
The following teams did not play each other in the group stage, due to the shortened women's competition: Oval Invincibles and Welsh Fire, Northern Superchargers and Trent Rockets, London Spirit and Manchester Originals, Southern Brave and Birmingham Phoenix.

11 August 2022
18:30 (N)
Scorecard

Northern Superchargers; 143/5 (100 balls)	v	Oval Invincibles (H); 146/1 (84 balls)
Jemimah Rodrigues 51 (32); Ryana MacDonald-Gay 2/25 (15 balls)		Lauren Winfield-Hill 74* (42); Jenny Gunn 1/22 (15 balls)

Oval Invincibles won by 9 wickets
The Oval, London
Umpires: Sarah Bartlett (Eng) and Rob White (Eng)
Player of the match: Lauren Winfield-Hill (Oval Invincibles)

- Oval Invincibles won the toss and elected to field.
- Points: Oval Invincibles 2, Northern Superchargers 0.

12 August 2022
15:00
Scorecard

London Spirit; 155/4 (100 balls)	v	Southern Brave (H); 159/4 (94 balls)
Beth Mooney 97* (55); Amanda-Jade Wellington 3/30 (20 balls)		Danni Wyatt 65 (34); Danielle Gibson 2/27 (20 balls)

Southern Brave won by 6 wickets
Rose Bowl, Southampton
Umpires: Tom Lungley (Eng) and Sue Redfern (Eng)
Player of the match: Danni Wyatt (Southern Brave)

- London Spirit won the toss and elected to bat.
- Points: Southern Brave 2, London Spirit 0.

13 August 2022
11:00
Scorecard

Trent Rockets; 119/5 (100 balls)	v	Manchester Originals (H); 76 (87 balls)
Abigail Freeborn 45* (38); Deandra Dottin 2/21 (20 balls)		Lizelle Lee 17 (13); Alana King 4/15 (20 balls)

Trent Rockets won by 43 runs
Old Trafford, Manchester
Umpires: Anna Harris (Eng) and Billy Taylor (Eng)
Player of the match: Alana King (Trent Rockets)

- Manchester Originals won the toss and elected to field.
- Points: Trent Rockets 2, Manchester Originals 0.
- Alana King took the first hat-trick in The Hundred Women's competition.

13 August 2022
14:30
Scorecard

Birmingham Phoenix; 161/5 (100 balls)	v	Welsh Fire (H); 142/5 (100 overs)
Elyse Perry 58 (31); Claire Nicholas 2/26 (20 balls)		Tammy Beaumont 39 (34); Georgia Elwiss 2/29 (20 balls)

Birmingham Phoenix won by 19 runs
Sophia Gardens, Cardiff
Umpires: Ian Blackwell (Eng) and Claire Polosak (Aus)
Player of the match: Ellyse Perry (Birmingham Phoenix)

- Welsh Fire won the toss and elected to field.
- Points: Birmingham Phoenix 2, Welsh Fire 0.

14 August 2022
11:00
Scorecard

(H) Northern Superchargers; 127/4 (100 balls)	v	London Spirit; 122/7 (100 balls)
Bess Heath 57 (34); Amelia Kerr 2/27 (20 balls)		Sophie Luff 39* (30); Alice Davidson-Richards 2/20 (20 balls)

Northern Superchargers won by 5 runs
Headlingley, Leeds
Umpires: Claire Polosak (Aus) and Neil Pratt (Eng)
Player of the match: Bess Heath (Northern Superchargers)

- London Spirit won the toss and elected to field.
- Points: Northern Superchargers 2, London Spirit 0.

14 August 2022
14:30
Scorecard

Southern Brave; 153/7 (100 balls)	v	Oval Invincibles (H); 141/7 (100 balls)
Smriti Mandhana 46 (25); Sophia Smale 2/12 (20 balls)		Lauren Winfield-Hill 25 (19); Danni Wyatt 2/16 (10 balls)

Southern Brave won by 12 runs
The Oval, London
Umpires: Sarah Bartlett (Eng) and Ben Debenham (Eng)
Player of the match: Georgia Adams (Southern Brave)

- Oval Invincibles won the toss and elected to field.
- Points: Southern Brave 2, Oval Invincibles 0.

15 August 2022
15:00
Scorecard

Trent Rockets; 116/9 (100 balls)	v	Birmingham Phoenix (H); 117/2 (91 balls)
Elyse Villani 33 (25); Emily Arlott 3/19 (20 balls)		Amy Jones 44* (32); Alana King 1/18 (20 balls)

Birmingham Phoenix won by 8 wickets
Edgbaston, Birmingham
Umpires: Paul Baldwin (Eng) and Anna Harris (Eng)
Player of the match: Amy Jones (Birmingham Phoenix)

- Birmingham Phoenix won the toss and elected to field.
- Points: Birmingham Phoenix 2, Trent Rockets 0.

16 August 2022
15:00
Scorecard

(H) Manchester Originals; 156/2 (100 balls)	v	Welsh Fire; 145/3 (100 balls)
Deandra Dottin 67* (37); Alex Hartley 1/17 (20 balls)		Hayley Matthews 69 (41); Deandra Dottin 2/21 (15 balls)

Manchester Originals won by 11 runs
Old Trafford, Manchester
Umpires: Jasmine Naeem (Eng) and Mark Newell (Eng)
Player of the match: Deandra Dottin (Manchester Originals)

- Welsh Fire won the toss and elected to field.
- Points: Manchester Originals 2, Welsh Fire 0.

17 August 2022
15:30
Scorecard

(H) Trent Rockets; 112/8 (100 balls)	v	Oval Invincibles; 115/5 (99 balls)
Nat Sciver 59* (48); Eva Gray 2/16 (20 balls)		Suzie Bates 41 (32); Bryony Smith 3/21 (19 balls)

Oval Invincibles won by 5 wickets
Trent Bridge, Nottingham
Umpires: James Middlebrook (Eng) and Sue Redfern (Eng)
Player of the match: Suzie Bates (Oval Invincibles)

- Oval Invincibles won the toss and elected to field.
- Points: Oval Invincibles 2, Trent Rockets 0.

18 August 2022
15:30
Scorecard

(H) Southern Brave; 136/5 (100 balls)	v	Manchester Originals; 127/8 (100 balls)
Smriti Mandhana 43 (25); Sophie Ecclestone 2/32 (20 balls)		Emma Lamb 57 (45); Amanda-Jade Wellington 3/27 (20 balls)

Southern Brave won by 9 runs
Rose Bowl, Southampton
Umpires: Hassan Adnan (Eng) and Jasmine Naeem (Eng)
Player of the match: Amanda-Jade Wellington (Southern Brave)

- Manchester Originals won the toss and elected to field.
- Points: Southern Brave 2, Manchester Originals 0.

19 August 2022
15:30
Scorecard

(H) Birmingham Phoenix; 153/4 (100 balls)	v	Northern Superchargers; 148/5 (100 balls)
Amy Jones 48 (28); Alice Davidson-Richards 3/30 (20 balls)		Alyssa Healy 46 (28); Sophie Molineux 2/11 (20 balls)

Birmingham Phoenix won by 5 runs
Edgbaston, Birmingham
Umpires: Paul Baldwin (Eng) and Anna Harris (Eng)
Player of the match: Sophie Molineux (Birmingham Phoenix)

- Northern Superchargers won the toss and elected to field.
- Points: Birmingham Phoenix 2, Northern Superchargers 0.

20 August 2022
15:30
Scorecard

(H) Trent Rockets; 142/4 (100 balls)	v	London Spirit; 124/6 (100 balls)
Bryony Smith 63 (44); Amelia Kerr 2/23 (20 balls)		Naomi Dattani 38* (34); Nat Sciver 2/20 (15 balls)

Trent Rockets won by 18 runs
Trent Bridge, Nottingham
Umpires: Neil Bainton (Eng) and Sarah Bartlett (Eng)
Player of the match: Bryony Smith (Trent Rockets)

- London Spirit won the toss and elected to field.
- Points: Trent Rockets 2, London Spirit 0.

21 August 2022
15:30
Scorecard

Manchester Originals; 160/3 (100 balls)	v	Northern Superchargers (H); 161/3 (99 balls)
Deandra Dottin 68* (30); Katie Levick 1/21 (20 balls)		Laura Wolvaardt 90* (49); Emma Lamb 1/23 (15 balls)

Northern Superchargers won by 7 wickets
Headingley, Leeds
Umpires: Sue Redfern (Eng) and Chris Watts (Eng)
Player of the match: Laura Wolvaardt (Northern Superchargers)

- Manchester Originals won the toss and elected to bat.
- Points: Northern Superchargers 2, Manchester Originals 0.

22 August 2022
15:00
Scorecard

Southern Brave; 122/8 (100 balls)	v	Welsh Fire (H); 108 (99 balls)
Sophia Dunkley 49 (43); Hayley Matthews 2/26 (20 balls)		Sarah Bryce 28 (21); Anya Shrubsole 3/20 (19 balls)

Southern Brave won by 14 runs
Sophia Gardens, Cardiff
Umpires: Jasmine Naeem (Eng) and Mark Newell (Eng)
Player of the match: Sophia Dunkley (Southern Brave)

- Welsh Fire won the toss and elected to field.
- Points: Southern Brave 2, Welsh Fire 0.

23 August 2022
15:00
Scorecard

Birmingham Phoenix; 106/7 (100 balls)	v	Oval Invincibles (H); 107/2 (87 balls)
Evelyn Jones 29 (29); Alice Capsey 3/15 (20 balls)		Lauren Winfield-Hill 41* (38); Emily Arlott 1/8 (17 balls)

Oval Invincibles won by 8 wickets
The Oval, London
Umpires: Paul Baldwin (Eng) and Sarah Bartlett (Eng)
Player of the match: Alice Capsey (Oval Invincibles)

- Oval Invincibles won the toss and elected to field.
- Points: Oval Invincibles 2, Birmingham Phoenix 0.

24 August 2022
15:00
Scorecard

Welsh Fire; 119/9 (100 balls)	v	London Spirit (H); 122/2 (86 balls)
Sarah Bryce 33 (25); Freya Davies 3/25 (20 balls)		Beth Mooney 61* (39); Claire Nicholas 1/18 (15 balls)

London Spirit won by 8 wickets
Lord's, London
Umpires: Anna Harris (Eng) and Billy Taylor (Eng)
Player of the match: Beth Mooney (London Spirit)

- Welsh Fire won the toss and elected to bat.
- Points: London Spirit 2, Welsh Fire 0.

25 August 2022
15:30
Scorecard

Trent Rockets; 88/8 (100 balls)	v	Southern Brave (H); 94/0 (56 balls)
Elyse Villani 25 (25); Lauren Bell 4/10 (20 balls)		Smriti Mandhana 57* (31)

Southern Brave won by 10 wickets
Rose Bowl, Southampton
Umpires: Sarah Bartlett (Eng) and Neil Pratt (Eng)
Player of the match: Lauren Bell (Southern Brave)

- Southern Brave won the toss and elected to field.
- Points: Southern Brave 2, Trent Rockets 0.

26 August 2022
15:30
Scorecard

(H) Welsh Fire; 123/6 (100 balls)	v	Northern Superchargers; 112/6 (100 balls)
Sarah Bryce 36 (30); Jenny Gunn 2/20 (15 balls)		Laura Wolvaardt 41 (38); Nicola Carey 3/18 (20 balls)

Welsh Fire won by 11 runs
Sophia Gardens, Cardiff
Umpires: Neil Bainton (Eng) and Jasmine Naeem (Eng)
Player of the match: Nicola Carey (Welsh Fire)

- Welsh Fire won the toss and elected to bat.
- Points: Welsh Fire 2, Northern Superchargers 0.

27 August 2022
15:30
Scorecard

(H) London Spirit; 80 (97 balls)	v	Oval Invincibles; 82/1 (58 balls)
Amelia Kerr 31 (31); Mady Villiers 4/12 (20 balls)		Lauren Winfield-Hill 44* (28); Grace Scrivens 1/23 (18 balls)

Oval Invincibles won by 9 wickets
Lord's, London
Umpires: James Middlebrook (Eng) and Sue Redfern (Eng)
Player of the match: Mady Villiers (Oval Invincibles)

- Oval Invincibles won the toss and elected to field.
- Points: Oval Invincibles 2, London Spirit 0.

28 August 2022
15:30
Scorecard

Manchester Originals; 122/6 (100 balls)	v	Birmingham Phoenix (H); 104 (100 balls)
Emma Lamb 30 (21); Emily Arlott 2/17 (20 balls)		Georgia Elwiss 32 (25); Sophie Ecclestone 3/8 (20 balls)

Manchester Originals won by 18 runs
Edgbaston, Birmingham
Umpires: Jasmine Naeem (Eng) and Chris Watts (Eng)
Player of the match: Sophie Ecclestone (Manchester Originals)

- Birmingham Phoenix won the toss and elected to field.
- Points: Manchester Originals 2, Birmingham Phoenix 0.

29 August 2022
15:30
Scorecard

Welsh Fire; 100/8 (100 balls)	v	Trent Rockets (H); 102/2 (82 balls)
Nicola Carey 27 (29); Bryony Smith 2/14 (15 balls)		Elyse Villani 55* (40); Lauren Filer 1/13 (20 balls)

Trent Rockets won by 8 wickets
Trent Bridge, Nottingham
Umpires: Neil Bainton (Eng) and Sue Redfern (Eng)
Player of the match: Elyse Villani (Trent Rockets)

- Welsh Fire won the toss and elected to bat.
- Points: Trent Rockets 2, Welsh Fire 0.

30 August 2022
15:00
Scorecard

Birmingham Phoenix; 82 (94 balls)	v	London Spirit (H); 83/6 (97 balls)
Evelyn Jones 24 (30); Danielle Gibson 2/12 (15 balls)		Naomi Dattani 28* (29); Emily Arlott 2/9 (20 balls)

London Spirit won by 4 wickets
Lord's, London
Umpires: Ben Debenham (Eng) and Anna Harris (Eng)
Player of the match: Naomi Dattani (London Spirit)

- London Spirit won the toss and elected to field.
- Points: London Spirit 2, Birmingham Phoenix 0.

31 August 2022
11:30
Scorecard

(H) Northern Superchargers; 145/6 (100 balls)	v	Southern Brave; 125/9 (100 balls)
Laura Wolvaardt 50 (35); Amanda-Jade Wellington 3/17 (20 balls)		Sophia Dunkley 38 (30); Katie Levick 2/10 (20 balls)

Northern Superchargers won by 20 runs
Headingley, Leeds
Umpires: Hassan Adnan (Eng) and Sue Redfern (Eng)
Player of the match: Laura Wolvaardt (Northern Superchargers)

- Southern Brave won the toss and elected to field.
- Points: Northern Superchargers 2, Southern Brave 0.

31 August 2022
15:00
Scorecard

Oval Invincibles; 163/2 (100 balls)	v	Manchester Originals (H); 131/6 (100 balls)
Suzie Bates 79* (47); Sophie Ecclestone 1/27 (20 balls)		Lizelle Lee 64 (41); Marizanne Kapp 2/14 (15 balls)

Oval Invincibles won by 32 runs
Old Trafford, Manchester
Umpires: Sophie McLelland (Eng) and Paul Pollard (Eng)
Player of the match: Suzie Bates (Oval Invincibles)

- Oval Invincibles won the toss and elected to bat.
- Points: Oval Invincibles 2, Manchester Originals 0.

=== Men ===
3 August 2022
19:00 (N)
Scorecard

Welsh Fire; 107/7 (100 balls)	v	Southern Brave (H); 109/1 (69 balls)
Ben Duckett 40 (31); Chris Jordan 2/16 (15 balls)		James Vince 71* (41); Jake Ball 1/25 (19 balls)

Southern Brave won by 9 wickets
Rose Bowl, Southampton
Umpires: Russell Warren (Eng) and Alex Wharf (Eng)
Player of the match: James Vince (Southern Brave)

- Southern Brave won the toss and elected to field.
- Points: Southern Brave 2, Welsh Fire 0.

4 August 2022
18:30 (N)
Scorecard

London Spirit; 171/6 (100 balls)	v	Oval Invincibles (H); 168/7 (100 balls)
Eoin Morgan 47 (29); Sunil Narine 2/25 (20 balls)		Hilton Cartwright 42 (23); Nathan Ellis 3/28 (20 balls)

London Spirit won by 3 runs
The Oval, London
Umpires: Nick Cook (Eng) and David Millns (Eng)
Player of the match: Nathan Ellis (London Spirit)

- Oval Invincibles won the toss and elected to field.
- Points: London Spirit 2, Oval Invincibles 0.

5 August 2022
18:30 (N)
Scorecard

(H) Manchester Originals; 161/4 (100 balls)	v	Northern Superchargers; 162/4 (94 balls)
Jos Buttler 59 (41); David Willey 2/24 (20 balls)		Adam Lyth 51 (30); Ashton Turner 1/7 (5 balls)

Northern Superchargers won by 6 wickets
Old Trafford, Manchester
Umpires: Rob Bailey (Eng) and Neil Mallender (Eng)
Player of the match: Adam Lyth (Northern Superchargers)

- Northern Superchargers won the toss and elected to field.
- Points: Northern Superchargers 2, Manchester Originals 0.

6 August 2022
14:30
Scorecard

Birmingham Phoenix; 143/7 (100 balls)	v	Trent Rockets (H); 147/4 (97 balls)
Liam Livingstone 47 (28); Daniel Sams 3/24 (20 balls)		Alex Hales 58 (41); Tom Helm 2/11 (12 balls)

Trent Rockets won by 6 wickets
Trent Bridge, Nottingham
Umpires: Peter Hartley (Eng) and Steve O'Shaughnessy (Eng)
Player of the match: Alex Hales (Trent Rockets)

- Trent Rockets won the toss and elected to field.
- Points: Trent Rockets 2, Birmingham Phoenix 0.

7 August 2022
14:00
Scorecard

Oval Invincibles; 158/5 (100 balls)	v	Welsh Fire (H); 119/6 (100 balls)
Will Jacks 81 (45); Ryan Higgins 2/31 (20 balls)		Joe Clarke 37 (29); Sunil Narine 3/21 (20 balls)

Oval Invincibles won by 39 runs
Sophia Gardens, Cardiff
Umpires: Nigel Llong (Eng) and Alex Wharf (Eng)
Player of the match: Will Jacks (Oval Invincibles)

- Welsh Fire won the toss and elected to field.
- Points: Oval Invincibles 2, Welsh Fire 0.

8 August 2022
18:30 (N)
Scorecard

(H) London Spirit; 160/6 (100 balls)	v	Manchester Originals; 108 (98 balls)
Zak Crawley 41 (34); Paul Walter 2/18 (20 balls)		Phil Salt 36 (34); Jordan Thompson 4/21 (20 balls)

London Spirit won by 52 runs
Lord's, London
Umpires: Neil Mallender (Eng) and Russell Warren (Eng)
Player of the match: Jordan Thompson (London Spirit)

- London Spirit won the toss and elected to bat.
- Points: London Spirit 2, Manchester Originals 0.

9 August 2022
18:30 (N)
Scorecard

(H) Northern Superchargers; 152/8 (100 balls)	v	Trent Rockets; 155/3 (94 balls)
David Wiese 50 (27); Daniel Sams 3/31 (20 balls)		Dawid Malan 88* (49); Dwayne Bravo 1/28 (20 balls)

Trent Rockets won by 7 wickets
Headingley, Leeds
Umpires: Ian Blackwell (Eng) and David Millns (Eng)
Player of the match: Dawid Malan (Trent Rockets)

- Trent Rockets won the toss and elected to field.
- Points: Trent Rockets 2, Northern Superchargers 0.

10 August 2022
18:30 (N)
Scorecard

(H) Birmingham Phoenix; 176/4 (100 balls)	v	Southern Brave; 123 (85 balls)
Will Smeed 101* (50); Marcus Stoinis 1/12 (10 balls)		Alex Davies 33 (24); Henry Brookes 5/25 (20 balls)

Birmingham Phoenix won by 53 runs
Edgbaston, Birmingham
Umpires: Nick Cook (Eng) and Peter Hartley (Eng)
Player of the match: Will Smeed (Birmingham Phoenix)

- Southern Brave won the toss and elected to field.
- Points: Birmingham Phoenix 2, Southern Brave 0.

11 August 2022
15:00
Scorecard

Northern Superchargers; 157/7 (100 balls)	v	Oval Invincibles (H); 158/7 (97 balls)
Adam Lyth 79 (33); Sunil Narine 3/11 (20 balls)		Sam Curran 60 (39); Dwayne Bravo 2/29 (20 balls)

Oval Invincibles won by 3 wickets
The Oval, London
Umpires: Rob Bailey (Eng) and Alex Wharf (Eng)
Player of the match: Sam Curran (Oval Invincibles)

- Oval Invincibles won the toss and elected to field.
- Points: Oval Invincibles 2, Northern Superchargers 0.

12 August 2022
18:30 (N)
Scorecard

London Spirit; 147/6 (100 balls)	v	Southern Brave (H); 138/7 (100 balls)
Daniel Bell-Drummond 46 (33); Michael Hogan 2/31 (20 balls)		Ross Whiteley 52 (33); Jordan Thompson 2/32 (20 balls)

London Spirit won by 9 runs
Rose Bowl, Southampton
Umpires: Nick Cook (Eng) and Ben Debenham (Eng)
Player of the match: Daniel Bell-Drummond (London Spirit)

- London Spirit won the toss and elected to bat.
- Points: London Spirit 2, Southern Brave 0.

13 August 2022
14:30
Scorecard

(H) Manchester Originals; 189/3 (100 balls)	v	Trent Rockets; 193/2 (94 balls)
Phil Salt 70* (46); Samit Patel 2/20 (20 balls)		Dawid Malan 98* (44); Tom Hartley 1/24 (20 balls)

Trent Rockets won by 8 wickets
Old Trafford, Manchester
Umpires: Nigel Llong (Eng) and Steve O'Shaughnessy (Eng)
Player of the match: Dawid Malan (Trent Rockets)

- Trent Rockets won the toss and elected to field.
- Points: Trent Rockets 2, Manchester Originals 0.

13 August 2022
18:00 (N)
Scorecard

Birmingham Phoenix; 130/7 (100 balls)	v	Welsh Fire (H); 126/5 (100 balls)
Matthew Wade 38 (30); David Payne 2/12 (15 balls)		Tom Banton 44 (32); Kane Richardson 2/15 (20 balls)

Birmingham Phoenix won by 4 runs
Sophia Gardens, Cardiff
Umpires: Peter Hartley (Eng) and Russell Warren (Eng)
Player of the match: Kane Richardson (Birmingham Phoenix)

- Welsh Fire won the toss and elected to field.
- Points: Birmingham Phoenix 2, Welsh Fire 0.

14 August 2022
14:30
Scorecard

(H) Northern Superchargers; 143/5 (100 balls)	v	London Spirit; 147/3 (82 balls)
Faf du Plessis 56 (35); Mason Crane 2/23 (20 balls)		Adam Rossington 66 (25); Adil Rashid 1/29 (15 balls)

London Spirit won by 7 wickets
Headlingley, Leeds
Umpires: Graham Lloyd (Eng) and Rob White (Eng)
Player of the match: Adam Rossington (London Spirit)

- Northern Superchargers won the toss and elected to bat.
- Points: London Spirit 2, Northern Superchargers 0.

14 August 2022
18:00 (N)
Scorecard

Southern Brave; 137/6 (100 balls)	v	Oval Invincibles (H); 142/3 (82 balls)
Marcus Stoinis 37 (27); Reece Topley 3/24 (20 balls)		Will Jacks 108* (48); James Fuller 1/22 (20 balls)

Oval Invincibles won by 7 wickets
The Oval, London
Umpires: David Millns (Eng) and Alex Wharf (Eng)
Player of the match: Will Jacks (Oval Invincibles)

- Oval Invincibles won the toss and elected to field.
- Points: Oval Invincibles 2, Southern Brave 0.

15 August 2022
18:30 (N)
Scorecard

Trent Rockets; 145/6 (100 balls)	v	Birmingham Phoenix (H); 149/3 (86 balls)
Daniel Sams 55* (25); Benny Howell 3/28 (20 balls)		Moeen Ali 52 (28); Luke Wood 3/17 (20 balls)

Birmingham Phoenix won by 7 wickets
Edgbaston, Birmingham
Umpires: Tom Lungley (Eng) and Martin Saggers (Eng)
Player of the match: Moeen Ali (Birmingham Phoenix)

- Birmingham Phoenix won the toss and elected to field.
- Points: Birmingham Phoenix 2, Trent Rockets 0.

16 August 2022
18:30 (N)
Scorecard

(H) Manchester Originals; 149/9 (100 balls)	v	Welsh Fire; 102 (89 balls)
Phil Salt 38 (22); Jake Ball 4/29 (20 balls)		Dwaine Pretorius 29 (14); Sean Abbott 4/8 (15 balls)

Manchester Originals won by 47 runs
Old Trafford, Manchester
Umpires: David Millns (Eng) and Neil Pratt (Eng)
Player of the match: Sean Abbott (Manchester Originals)

- Welsh Fire won the toss and elected to field.
- Points: Manchester Originals 2, Welsh Fire 0.

17 August 2022
19:00 (N)
Scorecard

(H) Trent Rockets; 181/4 (100 balls)	v	Oval Invincibles; 156/5 (100 balls)
Alex Hales 59 (29); Mohammad Hasnain 2/28 (15 balls)		Jordan Cox 61* (33); Tabraiz Shamsi 2/21 (20 balls)

Trent Rockets won by 25 runs
Trent Bridge, Nottingham
Umpires: Richard Kettleborough (Eng) and Neil Mallender (Eng)
Player of the match: Alex Hales (Trent Rockets)

- Oval Invincibles won the toss and elected to field.
- Points: Trent Rockets 2, Oval Invincibles 0.

18 August 2022
19:00 (N)
Scorecard

Manchester Originals; 188/3 (100 balls)	v	Southern Brave (H); 120 (84 balls)
Jos Buttler 68 (42); Jake Lintott 1/28 (20 balls)		George Garton 25 (14); Paul Walter 3/20 (15 balls)

Manchester Originals won by 68 runs
Rose Bowl, Southampton
Umpires: Rob Bailey (Eng) and Martin Saggers (Eng)
Player of the match: Andre Russell (Manchester Originals)

- Southern Brave won the toss and elected to field.
- Points: Manchester Originals 2, Southern Brave 0.

19 August 2022
19:00 (N)
Scorecard

Northern Superchargers; 169/6 (100 balls)	v	Birmingham Phoenix (H); 137/9 (100 balls)
Adam Lyth 56 (26); Moeen Ali 2/13 (15 balls)		Miles Hammond 31 (27); David Wiese 3/15 (20 balls)

Northern Superchargers won by 32 runs
Edgbaston, Birmingham
Umpires: James Middlebrook (Eng) and Steve O'Shaughnessy (Eng)
Player of the match: David Wiese (Northern Superchargers)

- Birmingham Phoenix won the toss and elected to field.
- Points: Northern Superchargers 2, Birmingham Phoenix 0.

20 August 2022
19:00 (N)
Scorecard

London Spirit; 122 (93 balls)	v	Trent Rockets (H); 127/4 (79 balls)
Ben McDermott 30 (25); Rashid Khan 3/25 (20 balls)		Colin Munro 67* (37); Chris Wood 1/19 (15 balls)

Trent Rockets won by 6 wickets
Trent Bridge, Nottingham
Umpires: Paul Pollard (Eng) and Martin Saggers (Eng)
Player of the match: Colin Munro (Trent Rockets)

- Trent Rockets won the toss and elected to field.
- Points: Trent Rockets 2, London Spirit 0.

21 August 2022
19:00 (N)
Scorecard

Manchester Originals; 208/5 (100 balls)	v	Northern Superchargers (H); 185/7 (100 balls)
Phil Salt 55 (25); Dwayne Bravo 2/42 (20 balls)		Adam Hose 59 (27); Paul Walter 3/27 (20 balls)

Manchester Originals won by 23 runs
Headingley, Leeds
Umpires: Mike Burns (Eng) and Rob White (Eng)
Player of the match: Phil Salt (Manchester Originals)

- Northern Superchargers won the toss and elected to field.
- Points: Manchester Originals 2, Northern Superchargers 0.

22 August 2022
18:30 (N)
Scorecard

(H) Welsh Fire; 129/8 (100 balls)	v	Southern Brave; 132/1 (82 balls)
Leus du Plooy 37 (25); George Garton 3/7 (15 balls)		Paul Stirling 74* (42); Dwaine Pretorius 1/20 (20 balls)

Southern Brave won by 9 wickets
Sophia Gardens, Cardiff
Umpires: Ben Debenham (Eng) and Graham Lloyd (Eng)
Player of the match: George Garton (Southern Brave)

- Southern Brave won the toss and elected to field.
- Sonny Baker (Southern Brave) made his T20 debut.
- Points: Southern Brave 2, Welsh Fire 0.

23 August 2022
18:30 (N)
Scorecard

Birmingham Phoenix; 166/6 (100 balls)	v	Oval Invincibles (H); 156/8 (100 balls)
Liam Livingstone 45 (32); Matt Milnes 3/32 (20 balls)		Jordan Cox 32 (29); Tom Helm 3/11 (20 balls)

Birmingham Phoenix won by 10 runs
The Oval, London
Umpires: James Middlebrook (Eng) and Martin Saggers (Eng)
Player of the match: Kane Richardson (Birmingham Phoenix)

- Oval Invincibles won the toss and elected to field.
- Points: Birmingham Phoenix 2, Oval Invincibles 0.

24 August 2022
18:30 (N)
Scorecard

(H) London Spirit; 156/6 (100 balls)	v	Welsh Fire; 139/9 (100 balls)
Dan Lawrence 43 (26); Ish Sodhi 2/19 (20 balls)		Ben Duckett 34 (19); Dan Lawrence 4/20 (20 balls)

London Spirit won by 17 runs
Lord's, London
Umpires: Hassan Adnan (Eng) and Richard Kettleborough (Eng)
Player of the match: Dan Lawrence (London Spirit)

- Welsh Fire won the toss and elected to field.
- Points: London Spirit 2, Welsh Fire 0.

25 August 2022
19:00 (N)
Scorecard

Trent Rockets; 138/6 (100 balls)	v	Southern Brave (H); 142/4 (95 balls)
Dawid Malan 59 (41); James Fuller 2/18 (20 balls)		Alex Davies 51* (43); Sam Cook 2/25 (20 balls)

Southern Brave won by 6 wickets
Rose Bowl, Southampton
Umpires: Billy Taylor (Eng) and Alex Wharf (Eng)
Player of the match: Alex Davies (Southern Brave)

- Southern Brave won the toss and elected to field.
- Points: Southern Brave 2, Trent Rockets 0.

26 August 2022
19:00 (N)
Scorecard

(H) Welsh Fire; 114/4 (100 balls)	v	Northern Superchargers; 116/4 (91 balls)
Ben Duckett 64* (48); Craig Miles 2/30 (20 balls)		Adam Lyth 47 (34); Ish Sodhi 2/14 (20 balls)

Northern Superchargers won by 6 wickets
Sophia Gardens, Cardiff
Umpires: Richard Kettleborough (Eng) and Tom Lungley (Eng)
Player of the match: Adam Lyth (Northern Superchargers)

- Welsh Fire won the toss and elected to bat.
- Points: Northern Superchargers 2, Welsh Fire 0.

27 August 2022
19:00 (N)
Scorecard

(H) London Spirit; 122/7 (100 balls)	v	Oval Invincibles; 124/4 (86 overs)
Adam Rossington 36 (22); Sam Curran 3/16 (20 balls)		Will Jacks 54 (38); Jordan Thompson 2/22 (16 balls)

Oval Invincibles won by 6 wickets
Lord's, London
Umpires: Richard Kettleborough (Eng) and Nigel Llong (Eng)
Player of the match: Sam Curran (Oval Invincibles)

- London Spirit won the toss and elected to bat.
- Points: Oval Invincibles 2, London Spirit 0.

28 August 2022
19:00 (N)
Scorecard

Manchester Originals; 154/6 (100 balls)	v	Birmingham Phoenix (H); 75 (74 balls)
Phil Salt 56 (38); Benny Howell 3/18 (20 balls)		Will Smeed 31 (17); Tom Hartley 4/22 (20 balls)

Manchester Originals won by 79 runs
Edgbaston, Birmingham
Umpires: Paul Pollard (Eng) and Alex Wharf (Eng)
Player of the match: Tom Hartley (Manchester Originals)

- Manchester Originals won the toss and elected to bat.
- Points: Manchester Originals 2, Birmingham Phoenix 0.

29 August 2022
19:00 (N)
Scorecard

(H) Trent Rockets; 172/4 (100 balls)	v	Welsh Fire; 143/6 (100 balls)
Dawid Malan 58 (37); Jake Ball 1/25 (20 balls)		Matt Critchley 55* (35); Tabraiz Shamsi 2/12 (20 balls)

Trent Rockets won by 29 runs
Trent Bridge, Nottingham
Umpires: Ian Blackwell (Eng) and Graham Lloyd (Eng)
Player of the match: Dawid Malan (Trent Rockets)

- Welsh Fire won the toss and elected to field.
- Points: Trent Rockets 2, Welsh Fire 0.

30 August 2022
18:30 (N)
Scorecard

(H) London Spirit; 139/6 (100 balls)	v	Birmingham Phoenix; 140/9 (100 balls)
Ravi Bopara 45 (20); Tom Helm 4/17 (20 balls)		Matthew Wade 81 (42); Mason Crane 4/24 (20 balls)

Birmingham Phoenix won by 1 wicket
Lord's, London
Umpires: Mike Burns (Eng) and Martin Saggers (Eng)
Player of the match: Matthew Wade (Birmingham Phoenix)

- Birmingham Phoenix won the toss and elected to field.
- Points: Birmingham Phoenix 2, London Spirit 0.

31 August 2022
15:00
Scorecard

(H) Northern Superchargers; 135/8 (100 balls)	v	Southern Brave; 119/9 (100 balls)
Harry Brook 29 (17); Rehan Ahmed 2/20 (20 balls); James Fuller 2/20 (20 balls)		Rehan Ahmed 33 (29); Wayne Parnell 4/16 (20 balls)

Northern Superchargers won by 16 runs
Headingley, Leeds
Umpires: Neil Mallender (Eng) and Steve O'Shaughnessy (Eng)
Player of the match: Wayne Parnell (Northern Superchargers)

- Southern Brave won the toss and elected to field.
- Points: Northern Superchargers 2, Southern Brave 0.

31 August 2022
18:30 (N)
Scorecard

Oval Invincibles; 143/9 (100 balls)	v	Manchester Originals (H); 144/4 (99 balls)
Sam Billings 53 (33); Josh Little 5/13 (20 balls)		Wayne Madsen 53* (39); Danny Briggs 2/22 (20 balls)

Manchester Originals won by 6 wickets
Old Trafford, Manchester
Umpires: Nigel Llong (Eng) and Alex Wharf (Eng)
Player of the match: Josh Little (Manchester Originals)

- Oval Invincibles won the toss and elected to bat.
- Points: Manchester Originals 2, Oval Invincibles 0.

== Knockout stages ==
=== Women ===
Eliminator			Final
			1	Oval Invincibles	105/5 (94 balls)
2	Southern Brave	134/6 (100 balls)	2	Southern Brave	101/7 (100 balls)
3	Trent Rockets	132/7 (100 balls)

==== Eliminator ====
2 September 2022
15:00
Scorecard

Southern Brave; 134/6 (100 balls)	v	Trent Rockets; 132/7 (100 balls)
Georgia Adams 38 (24); Bryony Smith 2/28 (15 balls)		Nat Sciver 72* (36); Georgia Adams 2/15 (15 balls)

Southern Brave won by 2 runs
Rose Bowl, Southampton
Umpires: Anna Harris (Eng) and Steve O'Shaughnessy (Eng)
Player of the match: Tahlia McGrath (Southern Brave)

- Trent Rockets won the toss and elected to field.

==== Final ====
3 September 2022
15:00
Scorecard

Southern Brave; 101/7 (100 balls)	v	Oval Invincibles; 105/5 (94 balls)
Sophia Dunkley 26 (23); Shabnim Ismail 2/12 (20 balls)		Marizanne Kapp 37* (33); Amanda-Jade Wellington 2/25 (20 balls)

Oval Invincibles won by 5 wickets
Lord's, London
Umpires: Ben Debenham (Eng) and Sue Redfern (Eng)
Player of the match: Marizanne Kapp (Oval Invincibles)

- Southern Brave won the toss and elected to bat.

=== Men ===
Eliminator			Final
			1	Trent Rockets	121/8 (98 balls)
2	Manchester Originals	151/5 (89 balls)	2	Manchester Originals	120/9 (100 balls)
3	London Spirit	150/7 (100 balls)

==== Eliminator ====
2 September 2022
18:30 (N)
Scorecard

London Spirit; 150/7 (100 balls)	v	Manchester Originals; 151/5 (89 balls)
Ben McDermott 59 (38); Paul Walter 3/29 (20 balls)		Laurie Evans 72 (34); Nathan Ellis 2/32 (19 balls)

Manchester Originals won by 5 wickets
Rose Bowl, Southampton
Umpires: Russell Warren (Eng) and Alex Wharf (Eng)
Player of the match: Laurie Evans (Manchester Originals)

- London Spirit won the toss and elected to bat.

==== Final ====
3 September 2022
18:30 (N)
Scorecard

Manchester Originals; 120/9 (100 balls)	v	Trent Rockets; 121/8 (98 balls)
Ashton Turner 26 (13); Sam Cook 4/18 (20 balls)		Dawid Malan 19 (18); Josh Little 2/18 (20 balls)

Trent Rockets won by 2 wickets
Lord's, London
Umpires: Mike Burns (Eng) and Martin Saggers (Eng)
Player of the match: Sam Cook (Trent Rockets)

- Manchester Originals won the toss and elected to bat.

== Statistics ==
=== Most runs ===
Women
Runs	Player	Team	High score
286	Laura Wolvaardt	Northern Superchargers	90 not out
232	Suzie Bates	Oval Invincibles	79 not out
228	Nat Sciver	Trent Rockets	72 not out
219	Lauren Winfield-Hill	Oval Invincibles	74 not out
211	Smriti Mandhana	Southern Brave	57 not out

- Source: ESPN Cricinfo

Men
Runs	Player	Team	High score
377	Dawid Malan	Trent Rockets	98 not out
353	Phil Salt	Manchester Originals	70 not out
299	Adam Lyth	Northern Superchargers	79
261	Will Jacks	Oval Invincibles	108 not out
259	Alex Hales	Trent Rockets	59

- Source: ESPN Cricinfo

=== Most wickets ===
Women
Wickets	Player	Team	Best bowling
17	Amanda-Jade Wellington	Southern Brave	3/17
11	Lauren Bell	Southern Brave	4/10
9	Emily Arlott	Birmingham Phoenix	3/19
9	Bryony Smith	Trent Rockets	3/21
9	Amelia Kerr	London Spirit	2/14

- Source: ESPN Cricinfo

Men
Wickets	Player	Team	Best bowling
14	Paul Walter	Manchester Originals	3/20
14	Tom Helm	Birmingham Phoenix	4/17
14	Jordan Thompson	London Spirit	4/21
13	Josh Little	Manchester Originals	5/13
13	Kane Richardson	Birmingham Phoenix	3/19

- Source: ESPN Cricinfo
