= Dan Moriarty (cricketer) =

English-South African cricketer

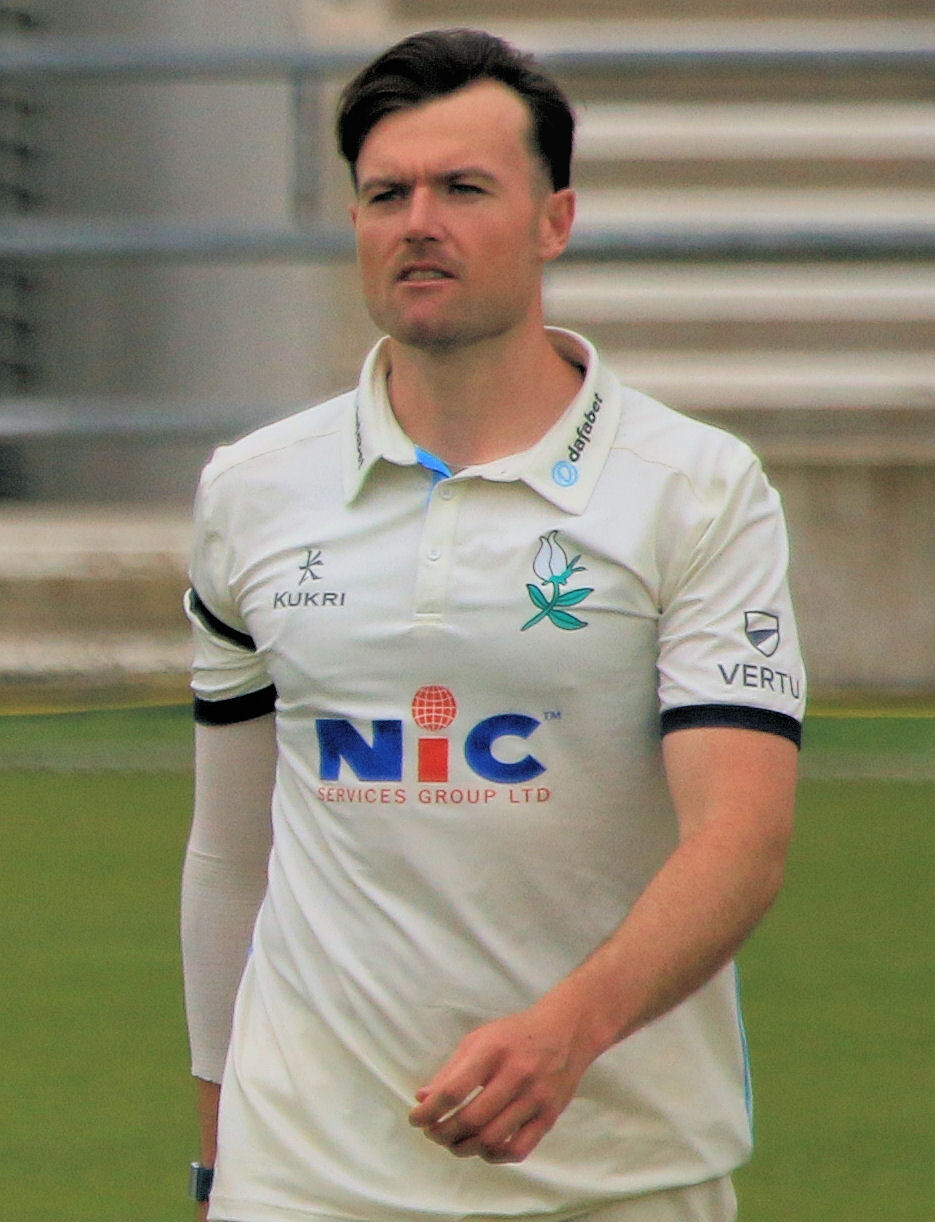
- Moriarty in 2024

Personal information
- Full name: Daniel Thornhill Moriarty
- Born: 12 February 1999 (age 27); Reigate, Surrey, England
- Height: 6 ft 0 in (1.83 m)
- Batting: Left-handed
- Bowling: Slow left-arm orthodox
- Role: Bowler

Domestic team information
- Years: Team
- 2020–2023: Surrey (squad no. 21)
- 2022: Southern Brave
- 2023: → Yorkshire (on loan)
- 2024–2026: Yorkshire
- First-class debut: 1 August 2020 Surrey v Middlesex
- List A debut: 22 July 2021 Surrey v Yorkshire

Career statistics
Competition	FC	LA	T20
Matches	25	32	63
Runs scored	206	114	51
Batting average	14.71	10.36	10.20
100s/50s	0/1	0/0	0/0
Top score	51*	30	9*
Balls bowled	5,008	1,541	1,238
Wickets	73	38	56
Bowling average	35.41	34.34	29.05
5 wickets in innings	6	0	0
10 wickets in match	1	0	0
Best bowling	6/60	4/30	4/25
Catches/stumpings	3/–	10/–	5/–
- Source: Cricinfo, 18 July 2026

Daniel Thornhill Moriarty (born 12 February 1999) is an English-South African cricketer.

== Career ==
He represented the South Africa U19 team in 2016. Moriarty has also played for the MCC Young Cricketers, and that is how he was noticed by several first-class counties. After being spotted, Moriarty signed a professional contract with Surrey.

He made his first-class debut on 1 August 2020, for Surrey in the 2020 Bob Willis Trophy. On debut, he took his maiden five-wicket haul in first-class cricket, with 5/64 in the second innings. He made his Twenty20 debut on 28 August 2020, for Surrey in the 2020 T20 Blast. He made his List A debut on 22 July 2021, for Surrey in the 2021 Royal London One-Day Cup.

In April 2022, he was bought by the Southern Brave for the 2022 season of The Hundred.

In August 2023, it was announced that he signed for Yorkshire starting in the 2024 season on a 3-year contract after a successful 4-game loan spell in 2023.
