= Danny Briggs =

English cricketer (born 1991)

Personal information
- Full name: Danny Richard Briggs
- Born: 30 April 1991 (age 35); Newport, Isle of Wight, England
- Nickname: Briggsy
- Height: 6 ft 1 in (1.85 m)
- Batting: Right-handed
- Bowling: Slow left-arm orthodox

International information
- National side: England
- Only ODI (cap 225): 21 February 2012 v Pakistan
- ODI shirt no.: 54
- T20I debut (cap 60): 12 September 2012 v South Africa
- Last T20I: 29 January 2014 v Australia
- T20I shirt no.: 54

Domestic team information
- Years: Team
- 2009–2015: Hampshire (squad no. 19)
- 2016–2020: Sussex (squad no. 21)
- 2020/21: Adelaide Strikers (squad no. 14)
- 2021, 2024–2025: Southern Brave
- 2021–2025: Warwickshire
- 2022: Oval Invincibles
- 2024/25: → Hampshire (on loan) (squad no. 54)
- 2026–: Sussex (squad no. 4)

Career statistics
Competition	ODI	T20I	FC	LA
Matches	1	7	150	110
Runs scored	–	0	2,877	421
Batting average	–	–	19.05	12.75
100s/50s	–/–	0/0	1/7	0/0
Top score	–	0*	120*	37*
Balls bowled	60	108	24,918	5,048
Wickets	2	5	351	114
Bowling average	19.50	39.80	35.54	37.61
5 wickets in innings	0	0	8	0
10 wickets in match	0	0	0	0
Best bowling	2/39	2/25	6/45	4/32
Catches/stumpings	0/–	1/–	52/–	35/–
- Source: Cricinfo, 28 November 2024

Danny Richard Briggs (born 30 April 1991) is an English cricketer who currently plays for Sussex County Cricket Club, previously playing for Hampshire County Cricket Club and Warwickshire County Cricket Club. Briggs is a right-handed batsman who bowls slow left-arm orthodox. He was born at Newport on the Isle of Wight and was educated on the island at Carisbrooke High School. Briggs is the first international player to be born on the Isle of Wight. Briggs made his debut for Hampshire County Cricket Club aged 18 in 2009, since his debut he has seen success in first-class and Twenty20 cricket. In 2011, he became the youngest English spin bowler to take 100 first-class wickets since Derek Underwood. He made his full international debut for England on 21 February 2012 against Pakistan in the fourth One Day International at the DSC Cricket Stadium in Dubai.

== Career ==
Briggs progressed through Hampshire's Academy system, having played for the county at junior level, while additionally playing for Ventnor Cricket Club on the Isle of Wight. He made his first team debut for the county in a List A match in the 2009 Friends Provident Trophy against Nottinghamshire at the Rose Bowl. In a season in which he made regular appearances for the Hampshire Second XI, as well as a single MCCA Knockout Trophy match for Berkshire, Briggs appeared in three further List A matches, as well as making his first-class debut in the County Championship against Somerset. Briggs made two further first-class appearances in 2009, taking a total of 8 first-class wickets at an average of 36.87.

His performances during the early part of the season, mostly for Hampshire's Second XI, caught the eye of the selectors of the England Under-19s, with Briggs called up to the team for their limited-overs matches against Bangladesh Under-19s in July 2009. Briggs made five Youth One Day International appearances, and a single Youth Twenty20 International appearance at London Road, Sleaford, during the series. Later in October 2009, Briggs toured Bangladesh with the England Under-19s, playing four further Youth One Day Internationals against the hosts, as well as making his only Youth Test match appearance at the Zohur Ahmed Chowdhury Stadium, Chittagong, during which he took a five-wicket haul. Briggs was a part of England Under-19s squad for the 2010 Under-19 World Cup, which was played in New Zealand in January 2010, alongside Hampshire teammates Michael Bates and James Vince. Briggs played in three matches during the tournament, against Hong Kong Under-19s, Afghanistan Under-19s and the West Indies Under-19s. He won one man of the match award against Afghanistan, for his bowling performance of 3/15.

Briggs was able to force his way into Hampshire's first team virtually from the start of the 2010 season, due in part to Imran Tahir joining Warwickshire, while his replacement, Ajantha Mendis was unable to fulfill his commitment to playing for Hampshire, though the county did draft in the services of Rangana Herath. Briggs' breakthrough season was one in which he achieved great success. In first-class cricket, Hampshire struggled near the foot of the County Championship for most of the season, with Briggs playing in twelve of Hampshire's sixteen County Championship matches. He took 34 wickets in that season, ending the season as Hampshire's third highest wicket taker in the County Championship, behind Dominic Cork (45) and James Tomlinson (46). His performance against Kent in the penultimate match of season was particularly vital, with his figures of 4/93 in Kent's second-innings helping Hampshire secure a win late in the match, which secured their status in Division One of the County Championship for 2011. Though Briggs had a quiet season in List A matches, taking just three wickets in seven one-day matches. It was particularly in Twenty20 matches that Briggs stood out. His debut in that format came during the 2010 Friends Provident t20 against Kent. In what would ultimately be a tournament winning campaign for Hampshire, Briggs took 31 wickets at an average of 14.35. In the semi-final against Essex, he was named man of the match for his economical bowling performance, which saw him take 3/29. Overall, Briggs was the second leading wicket taker during the competition, ending just two wickets behind Alfonso Thomas. His wickets during the tournament were also the most by a Hampshire player in any domestic Twenty20 tournament. In recognition of his performances in that season, he was Hampshire's recipient of the NBC Denis Compton Award.

In November and December 2011, Briggs toured Australia with the England Performance Programme. Soon after this he was selected for the England Lions squad, which had an invitation to take part in the West Indian domestic Regional Four Day Competition in February and March. Playing six first-class matches for the Lions, he took a total of 33 wickets at an average of 18.87, including his maiden first-class five wicket haul with figures of 6/45, which came against the Windward Islands. He also took a second five wicket haul against Jamaica. Briggs was the Lions leading wicket taker during their spell in the competition. Prior to this, in early January, Briggs played for Hampshire in the 2010–11 Caribbean Twenty20, which Hampshire and Somerset had been invited to play as compensation for being unable to take part in the 2010 Champions League Twenty20 due to its scheduling clash with the end of the 2010 English season. As winners and runners-up of the 2010 Friends Provident t20, both Hampshire and Somerset would otherwise have been eligible to take part. Hampshire had another successful Twenty20 tournament, with Hampshire reaching the final, where they would eventually lose to Trinidad and Tobago. Briggs, who played in all six matches, took 5 wickets.

Briggs was in competition with the returning Imran Tahir during the 2011 season, making eleven County Championship appearances, in what was ultimately a season of struggle for Hampshire, which resulted in their relegation from Division One to Division Two of the County Championship. Briggs took a total of 38 wickets at an average of 36.65, with best figures of 6/65, ending the season as Hampshire's leading wicket taker. He claimed his hundredth first-class wicket in July against Sussex, when he took the wicket of Andrew Hodd. In doing so, Briggs became the youngest English spin bowler since Derek Underwood to reach the landmark. He was again quiet in List A matches throughout 2011, making eight appearances in that format, and taking 9 wickets. He once again impressed in that seasons Friends Provident t20, which once again saw Hampshire reach finals day for a second consecutive season, with Briggs making sixteen appearances during the competition. As part of a three-pronged spin bowling attack alongside Tahir and Pakistani Shahid Afridi, Briggs took 23 wickets at an average of 14.91, while also recording his maiden five wicket haul in Twenty20 matches, with figures of 5/19 against Durham. His performances in this format once again caught the eye of the England selectors, this time Briggs was called up the main England squad for their season ending two match Twenty20 International series against the West Indies, though he didn't feature in either match. Briggs was for the second season running Hampshire's recipient of the NBC Denis Compton Award.

In the inaugural season of The Hundred, he was signed by the Southern Brave. In April 2022, he was bought by the Oval Invincibles for the 2022 season of The Hundred. Briggs returned to Sussex for the 2026 season, where he took on a player-coach role.

=== International career ===
Following the 2011 season, Briggs was once again selected for the England Lions subcontinent tours to Bangladesh and Sri Lanka in January and February 2012. Touring Bangladesh first, Briggs made four List A appearances against Bangladesh A, taking 8 wickets at an average of 18.00. He also played tour Twenty20 matches against the same opposition during the tour. On the tour to Sri Lanka, he played a further five List A matches against Sri Lanka A, again taking 8 wickets, which came at an average of 25.00 and saw him claim his career best figures in that format, 3/27. His performances led to speculation in early February that Briggs would be selected for England's One Day International and Twenty20 International squads for their series against Pakistan in the United Arab Emirates. Briggs was called up to the squad on 7 February, as one of three spinners in the team, alongside Samit Patel and Graeme Swann. On 21 February 2012, Briggs made his debut for England against Pakistan in the fourth ODI in Dubai, becoming the first person from the Isle of Wight to represent England, and the youngest to date Hampshire cricketer. Briggs bowled his full complement of ten overs, taking the wickets of Umar Akmal and Shoaib Malik to finish with figures of 2/39, which helped restrict Pakistan to 237 all out. England reached their target with four wickets to spare, thanks largely to Kevin Pietersen's 130. Briggs didn't feature in the three match Twenty20 International series which followed the one-dayers.

Briggs started the 2012 season for Hampshire by being awarded a County Cap. He was given this after the first session of Hampshire's first match of the 2012 season against Gloucestershire. He also took 2 wickets in this match which Hampshire narrowly lost.
