= Jake Lintott =

English cricketer (born 1993)

Personal information
- Full name: Jacob Benedict Lintott
- Born: 22 April 1993 (age 33); Taunton, Somerset, England
- Batting: Right-handed
- Bowling: Slow left-arm unorthodox
- Role: Bowler

Domestic team information
- Years: Team
- 2017: Hampshire
- 2018: Gloucestershire
- 2020–present: Warwickshire (squad no. 23)
- 2021–2022: Southern Brave (squad no. 23)
- 2021: Barbados Royals
- 2022: Fortune Barishal
- 2023: Mohammedan Sporting Club
- 2024: Abu Dhabi Knight Riders
- 2026: → Kent (loan)
- First-class debut: 11 July 2021 Warwickshire v Worcestershire
- List A debut: 14 July 2022; England Lions v South Africa

Career statistics
Competition	FC	LA	T20
Matches	3	37	116
Runs scored	110	451	317
Batting average	27.50	28.18	10.93
100s/50s	0/1	0/2	0/0
Top score	78	52	41
Balls bowled	384	1,798	2,267
Wickets	6	60	124
Bowling average	35.16	29.06	24.06
5 wickets in innings	0	2	0
10 wickets in match	0	0	0
Best bowling	3/10	5/37	4/20
Catches/stumpings	2/–	11/–	54/–
- Source: Cricinfo, 11 August 2026

Jacob Benedict Lintott (born 22 April 1993) is an English cricketer.

Lintott attended Queen's College, Taunton, where he captained the First XI in 2010 and 2011 and set new run-scoring and wicket-taking records for the school, with 2,723 runs and 153 wickets in his career there. He made his Twenty20 cricket debut for Hampshire in the 2017 NatWest t20 Blast on 18 August 2017. He made his first-class debut on 11 July 2021, for Warwickshire in the 2021 County Championship. He was drafted by Southern Brave for the inaugural season of The Hundred. He was the highest wicket taker for Southern Brave with 11 wickets in 9 matches. In August 2021, he was signed by the Barbados Royals for 2021 Caribbean Premier League.

In April 2022, he was bought by the Southern Brave for the 2022 season of The Hundred. He made his List A debut on 14 July 2022, for the England Lions during South Africa's tour of England. In March 2023 he joined Mohammedan Sporting Club for the 2022–23 season of the Dhaka Premier Division Cricket League, taking 17 wickets in six matches, including figures of 5 for 37 against Brothers Union. In 2026, he joined Kent on loan for the duration of the T20 Blast.
