= Joe Weatherley =

English cricketer (born 1997)

Personal information
- Full name: Joe James Weatherley
- Born: 19 January 1997 (age 29); Winchester, Hampshire, England
- Height: 6 ft 3 in (1.91 m)
- Batting: Right-handed
- Bowling: Right-arm off break
- Role: Batsman

Domestic team information
- Years: Team
- 2015–present: Hampshire (squad no. 5)
- 2017: → Kent (on loan) (squad no. 9)
- 2022–2024: Southern Brave
- 2026: Birmingham Phoenix
- First-class debut: 4 April 2016 Hampshire v Cardiff MCCU
- List A debut: 7 June 2016 Hampshire v Middlesex

Career statistics
Competition	FC	LA	T20
Matches	70	36	116
Runs scored	2,575	1,037	2,797
Batting average	23.40	35.75	31.42
100s/50s	2/13	3/5	0/13
Top score	168	116*	88*
Balls bowled	396	327	6
Wickets	5	8	0
Bowling average	53.60	27.62	–
5 wickets in innings	0	0	–
10 wickets in match	0	0	–
Best bowling	1/2	4/25	–
Catches/stumpings	55/–	14/–	43/–
- Source: CricInfo, 26 September 2026

Joe James Weatherley (born 19 January 1997) is an English professional cricketer, who plays for Hampshire County Cricket Club. Weatherley, who has represented and captained England at under 19 level, is a right-handed batsman and off spinner. He made his first-class cricket debut for Hampshire against Cardiff MCCU in April 2016, going on to make his List A and Twenty20 debuts for the club later in the same season. He left King Edward VI School, Southampton in 2015.

During the 2015–16 and 2016–17 English off-seasons Weatherley played Adelaide Grade cricket for Woodville, making a career-best score of 220 in January 2017 for the team. On 14 March 2017, Weatherley signed on loan for Kent for the 2017 season. He made his debut for the county in their opening County Championship match of 2017 against Gloucestershire at Canterbury in April.

In April 2022, he was bought by the Southern Brave for the 2022 season of The Hundred.
