= Southern Brave =

100-ball cricket side in Southampton, Hampshire

Personnel
- Captain: Sophie Molineux (women); Chris Jordan (men)
- Coach: Jonathan Batty (women); Hemang Badani (men)
- Overseas players: Charli Knott; Lizelle Lee; Sophie Molineux; Jemimah Rodrigues; Laura Wolvaardt; (women); Nikhil Chaudhary; David Miller; Marcus Stoinis; Tristan Stubbs; (men)
- Owner: Hampshire County Cricket Club (51%), GMR Group (49%)

Team information
- Colours
- Founded: 2019
- Home ground: Rose Bowl
- Capacity: 15,000 (25,000 with temporary seating)

History
- No. of titles: 2
- Men's title wins: 1 (2021)
- Women's title wins: 1 (2023)
- Official website: Southern Brave
The Hundred

Southern Brave is a franchise 100-ball cricket side based in the city of Southampton. The team represents the historic counties of Hampshire and Sussex in the newly founded The Hundred competition, which took place for the first time during the 2021 English and Welsh cricket season. Both the men's side and the women's side play at the Rose Bowl, Hampshire.

== History ==
In May 2019, the England and Wales Cricket Board applied to trademark six of the Hundred's eight team names, including Southern Brave. While the tournament had often been described as "city-based" in early reports, or that the names would have no geographical element, Southern Brave were not the only team to have a regional name.

In August 2019 the side announced that former Sri Lanka batsman and 2019 IPL winning coach Mahela Jayawardene would be the men's team's first coach, while former England Women captain Charlotte Edwards was appointed coach of the Women's team. Jayawardene will be assisted by former two former Hampshire players: Former New Zealand international bowler Shane Bond and former opening batsmen and current coach of Hampshire 2nd XI Jimmy Adams, while Richard Halsall will also assist the men's side.

The inaugural Hundred draft took place in October 2019 and saw the Brave claim Jofra Archer as their headline men's draftee, and Anya Shrubsole as the women's headliner. They were joined by England international James Vince and Chris Jordan for the men's team, while Danielle Wyatt joined Shrubsole on the women's side.

As part of the 2025 Hundred sale, the ECB gave Hampshire County Cricket Club a 51% stake in the franchise with the remaining 49% sold in an auction process. India's GMR Group purchased 49% of the franchise with Hampshire County Cricket Club retaining their stake. They took operational control on 1 October 2025.

== Honours ==
=== Men's honours ===
The Hundred

- Winners: 2021
- Runners-up: 2024
- Third place: 2023

=== Women's honours ===
The Hundred

- Winners: 2023
- Runners-up: 2021, 2022, 2025
- Third place: 2026

== Ground ==
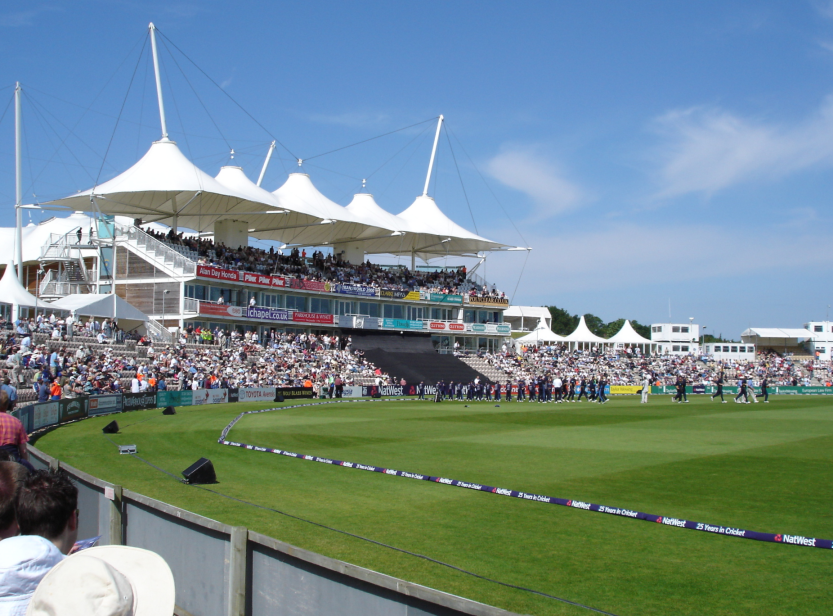
The Ageas Bowl

Both the Southern Brave men's and women's sides play at the home in Hampshire County Cricket Club, the Utilita Bowl, in West End, a short distance outside of Southampton. The women's side had been due to play at the home in Sussex County Cricket Club, the County Ground in Hove, but both teams were brought together at the same ground as a result of the COVID-19 pandemic.

== Current squads ==
- **Bold** denotes players with international caps.
- * denotes a player who is unavailable for rest of the season.

=== Women's side ===
No.	Name	Nationality	Date of birth (age)	Batting style	Bowling style	Notes
Batters
5	**Jemimah Rodrigues**	India	5 September 2000 (age 26)	Right-handed	Right-arm off break	Overseas player; Ruled out through injury
9	**Jodi Grewcock**	England	30 November 2004 (age 21)	Left-handed	Right-arm leg break	
14	**Laura Wolvaardt**	South Africa	26 April 1999 (age 27)	Right-handed	—	Overseas player
22	**Maia Bouchier**	England	5 December 1998 (age 27)	Right-handed	Right-arm medium	England central contract
All-rounders
10	Phoebe Franklin	England	18 February 1998 (age 28)	Right-handed	Right-arm medium	
11	Naomi Dattani	England	28 April 1994 (age 32)	Left-handed	Left-arm medium	Wildcard player
70	**Katherine Fraser**	Scotland	9 April 2005 (age 21)	Right-handed	Right-arm off break	Wildcard player
88	Charli Knott	Australia	29 November 2002 (age 23)	Right-handed	Right-arm off break	Overseas player; Replacement player
Wicket-keepers
18	Rebecca Odgers	England	10 February 2003 (age 23)	Right-handed	Right-arm off break	
67	**Lizelle Lee**	South Africa	2 April 1992 (age 34)	Right-handed	Right-arm medium	Overseas player
Pace bowlers
15	Daisy Gibb	England	29 November 2005 (age 20)	Right-handed	Right-arm medium	
45	Ellie Anderson	England	30 October 2003 (age 22)	Right-handed	Right-arm medium	
63	**Lauren Bell**	England	2 January 2001 (age 25)	Right-handed	Right-arm fast-medium	England central contract
95	**Issy Wong**	England	15 May 2002 (age 24)	Right-handed	Right-arm fast-medium	
Spin bowlers
3	**Sarah Glenn**	England	27 August 1999 (age 27)	Right-handed	Right-arm leg break	England central contract
21	**Tilly Corteen-Coleman**	England	23 August 2007 (age 19)	Left-handed	Slow left-arm orthodox	
23	**Sophie Molineux**	Australia	17 January 1998 (age 28)	Left-handed	Left-arm orthodox spin	Captain; Overseas player

=== Men's side ===
No.	Name	Nationality	Date of birth (age)	Batting style	Bowling style	Notes
Batters
7	Ben McKinney	England	4 October 2004 (age 22)	Left-handed	Right-arm off break	
10	**David Miller**	South Africa	10 June 1989 (age 37)	Left-handed	Right-arm off break	Overseas player
18	Saif Zaib	England	22 November 1998 (age 27)	Left-handed	Slow left-arm orthodox	Wildcard player
28	Tom Abell	England	5 March 1994 (age 32)	Right-handed	Right-arm medium	
30	**Tristan Stubbs**	South Africa	4 August 2000 (age 26)	Right-handed	Right-arm off break	
All-rounders
1	**Moeen Ali**	England	18 June 1987 (age 39)	Left-handed	Right-arm off break	Replacement player
4	**Nikhil Chaudhary**	Australia	4 May 1996 (age 30)	Right-handed	Right-arm leg break	Overseas player
17	**Marcus Stoinis**	Australia	16 August 1989 (age 37)	Right-handed	Right-arm fast-medium	Overseas player
34	**Chris Jordan**	England	4 October 1988 (age 38)	Right-handed	Right-arm fast-medium	Captain
44	Caleb Falconer	England	14 September 2006 (age 20)	Right-handed	Right-arm fast-medium	
Wicket-keepers
19	Michael Pepper	England	25 June 1998 (age 28)	Right-handed	—	
39	**Jamie Smith**	England	12 July 2000 (age 26)	Right-handed	—	England central contract
45	Thomas Rew	England	29 November 2007 (age 18)	Right-handed	—	Ruled out through injury
Pace bowlers
8	**Daniel Worrall**	Australia	10 July 1991 (age 35)	Right-handed	Right-arm fast-medium	UK passport
14	**Luke Wood**	England	2 August 1995 (age 31)	Left-handed	Left-arm fast-medium	
22	**Jofra Archer**	England	1 April 1995 (age 31)	Right-handed	Right-arm fast	England central contract
43	Manny Lumsden	England	3 November 2008 (age 17)	Right-handed	Right-arm fast-medium	Wildcard player
Spin bowlers
95	**Adil Rashid**	England	17 February 1988 (age 38)	Right-handed	Right-arm leg break	England central contract

== Seasons ==
=== Women's team ===
Season	Group stage							Playoff stage		Ref.
Season	Pld	W	L	T	NR	Pts	Pos	Pld	Pos	Ref.
2021	8	7	1	0	0	14	1st	1 (Note: Southern Brave women finished top of the group stage and qualified automatically for the final in 2021. They lost the final against Oval Invincibles by 48 runs.)	2nd	
2022	6	5	1	0	0	10	2nd	2 (Note: Southern Brave women qualified for the eliminator in 2022. They played 2 games, winning the eliminator against Trent Rockets by 2 runs, losing the final against Oval Invincibles by 5 wickets.)	2nd	
2023	8	7	1	0	0	14	1st	1 (Note: Southern Brave women finished top of the group stage and qualified automatically for the final in 2023. They won the final against Northern Superchargers by 34 runs.)	1st	
2024	8	1	6	1	0	3	8th	Did not progress		
2025	8	8	0	0	0	32	1st	1 (Note: Southern Brave women finished top of the group stage and qualified automatically for the final in 2025. They lost the final against Northern Superchargers by 7 wickets.)	2nd	
2026	8	5	3	0	0	20	3rd	1 (Note: Southern Brave women qualified for the eliminator in 2026. They played 1 game, losing the eliminator against Sunrisers Leeds by 5 wickets.)	3rd	

=== Men's team ===
Season	Group stage							Playoff stage		Ref.
Season	Pld	W	L	T	NR	Pts	Pos	Pld	Pos	Ref.
2021	8	5	2	0	1	11	2nd	2 (Note: Southern Brave men qualified for the eliminator in 2021. They played 2 games, winning the eliminator against Trent Rockets by 7 wickets, winning the final against Birmingham Phoenix by 32 runs.)	1st	
2022	8	3	5	0	0	6	7th	Did not progress		
2023	8	4	3	0	1	9	3rd	1 (Note: Southern Brave men qualified for the eliminator in 2023. They played 1 game, losing the eliminator against Manchester Originals by 7 wickets.)	3rd	
2024	8	5	2	0	1	11	3rd	2 (Note: Southern Brave men qualified for the eliminator in 2024. They played 2 games, winning the eliminator against Birmingham Phoenix in the Super Five after a tied match, losing the final against Oval Invincibles by 17 runs.)	2nd	
2025	8	4	4	0	0	16	4th	Did not progress		
2026	8	3	5	0	0	12	6th	Did not progress		

== See also ==
- List of Southern Brave cricketers
- List of cricket grounds in England and Wales
- List of Test cricket grounds
