= Chris Jordan (cricketer) =

Barbadian-born British cricketer

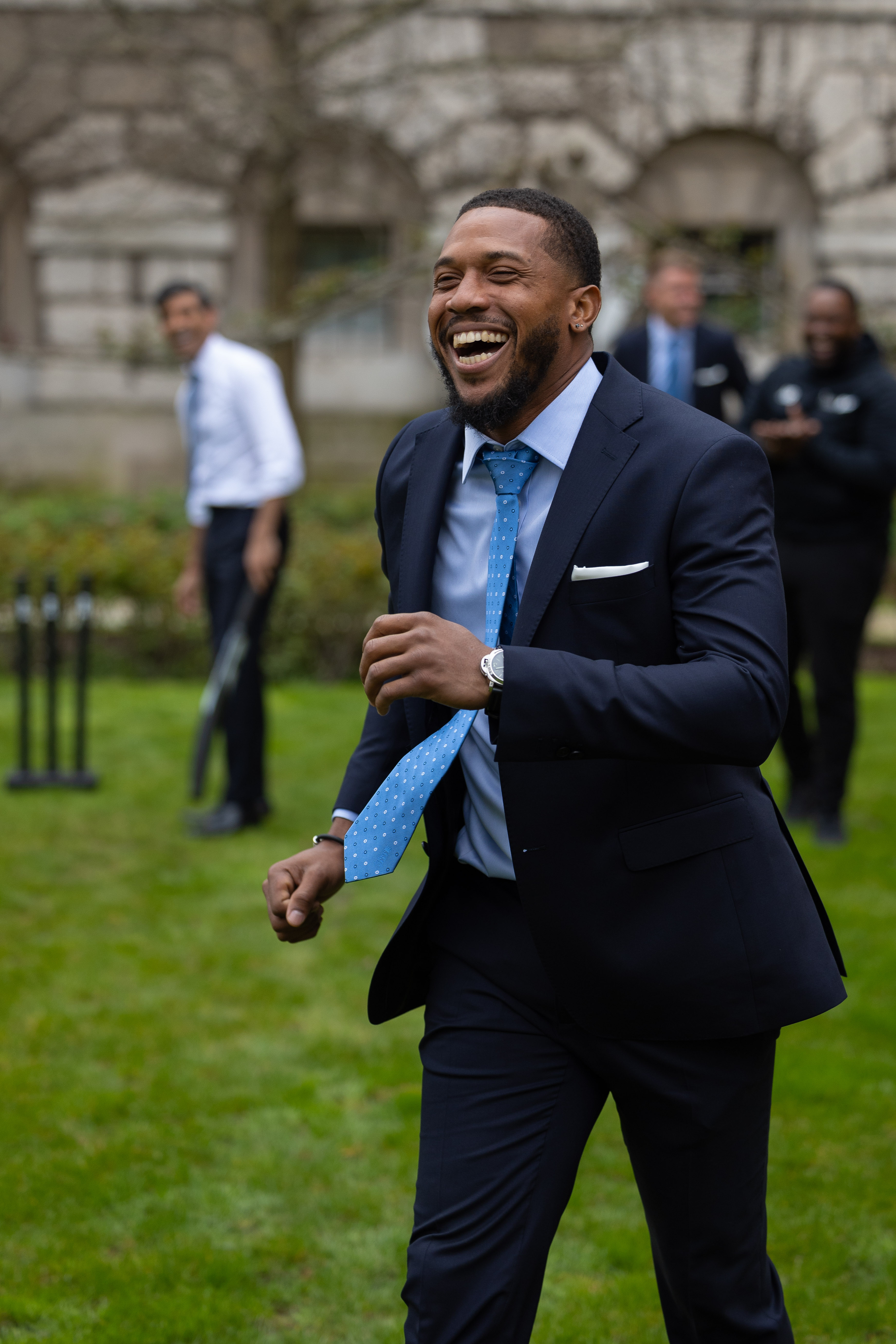
- Jordan in 2023

Personal information
- Full name: Christopher James Jordan
- Born: 4 October 1988 (age 38); Christ Church, Barbados
- Batting: Right-handed
- Bowling: Right-arm fast-medium
- Role: Bowler

International information
- National side: England (2013–present)
- Test debut (cap 663): 12 June 2014 v Sri Lanka
- Last Test: 1 May 2015 v West Indies
- ODI debut (cap 231): 16 September 2013 v Australia
- Last ODI: 17 November 2022 v Australia
- ODI shirt no.: 34
- T20I debut (cap 65): 2 February 2014 v Australia
- Last T20I: 27 June 2024 v India
- T20I shirt no.: 34

Domestic team information
- Years: Team
- 2007–2012 (Note: Only teams Jordan has played for more than one season are included in this list.): Surrey
- 2011/12–2012/13: Barbados
- 2013–2021: Sussex
- 2017–2019: Peshawar Zalmi
- 2017–2018: Sunrisers Hyderabad
- 2017/18–2018/19: Northern Districts
- 2019–2024: Trinbago Knight Riders
- 2020; 2022: Karachi Kings
- 2020–2021: Punjab Kings
- 2021/22–2022/23: Sydney Sixers
- 2021–present: Southern Brave
- 2022–present: Surrey
- 2023/24–present: Hobart Hurricanes
- 2024–2025: Multan Sultans
- 2026: Belfast Wolves

Career statistics
Competition	Test	ODI	T20I	FC
Matches	8	35	95	114
Runs scored	180	184	439	3,443
Batting average	18.00	12.26	13.71	25.31
100s/50s	0/0	0/0	0/0	3/15
Top score	35	38*	36	166
Balls bowled	1,530	1,660	1,953	18,986
Wickets	21	46	108	335
Bowling average	35.80	36.08	26.36	32.02
5 wickets in innings	0	1	0	10
10 wickets in match	0	0	0	0
Best bowling	4/18	5/29	4/6	7/43
Catches/stumpings	14/–	19/–	48/–	137/–
Medal record
Men's Cricket
Representing England
ICC Men's T20 World Cup
Winner	2022 Australia
Runner-up	2016 India
- Source: ESPNcricinfo, 20 July 2024

Christopher James Jordan (born 4 October 1988) is a Bajan British cricketer who plays for England in One Day International (ODI) and Twenty20 International (T20I) cricket, and previously played for the Test team. In domestic cricket, he represents Surrey, having previously played for Sussex, and has played in multiple Twenty20 leagues.

Jordan made his ODI debut on 2013, his T20I debut in 2014, and played for the Test team between 2014 and 2015. He was part of the England team that won the 2022 T20 World Cup.

Jordan plays as a right-arm fast-medium bowler. He is England's highest wicket-taker in T20Is.

== Early life ==
Jordan and both of his parents were born in Barbados; his maternal grandparents are British citizens. After initially being educated at Combermere School in Bridgetown, Barbados where he studied alongside singer Rihanna, he gained a sporting scholarship to complete his formal education at Dulwich College, in England.

== Domestic career ==
Jordan made his 1st XI debut for Surrey versus Middlesex at Lord's in August 2007. He took 2–41 on his first-class debut and in his second match, versus Durham, helped to dismiss the home team by taking 3–42. He received the NBC Denis Compton Award as Surrey's most promising young player in 2007.

After suffering a stress fracture of the back, Jordan was unable to play in the 2010 English cricket season. He resumed training in December that year.

At the end of the 2012 season, Jordan was released by Surrey after six years with the county. He returned to Barbados to play a second winter season for the Barbados national cricket team, before joining Sussex for the English 2013 season, taking championship best figures of 6–48 on debut against Yorkshire.

== International career ==
Qualified to play for both the West Indies and England (through both maternal genealogy and residency), he chose to play for England. He made his ODI debut in September 2013 against Australia, and took his first ODI five-wicket haul against Sri Lanka on 28 May 2014 at Old Trafford, with figures of 5 for 29, helping England to a 10-wicket win.

Jordan was named in the England Test squad for their series against Sri Lanka, before making his debut in the first Test.

He was also named in the 3rd, 4th and 5th Test matches of India's tour of England in 2014.

=== 2013–14 Australia and T20 World Cup ===
Jordan made his ODI debut against Australia, taking figures of 3–51. Jordan's selection had come as a surprise to many following his injury problems. Jordan played in the first two matches of the return series in Australia, taking 1–50 and 2–53. Jordan played in the final three games of the series, the pick of his figures being 2–37 in the final game of the series. Jordan's economy rate did not pass 6.00 runs per over in any of the games, making him one of England's stand out bowlers.

Jordan made his T20 debut at the World Cup against New Zealand in a rain affected match. He took 2–28 in the second match against Sri Lanka as England secured an unlikely victory. Jordan played in the defeat against South Africa which ended their hopes of progressing in the competition. He took 1–13 in three overs against the Netherlands but was unable to prevent an embarrassing defeat for England.

=== 2014 Sri Lanka, India and Tri Series ===
In the first match of the ODI series against Sri Lanka, Jordan excelled, taking 3–25 and smashing 38 off just 16 balls. This earned him the man of the match award. Jordan took 5–29 in the third match of the series as England cruised to victory. Jordan was expensive in the fourth match, managing 2–67 as Sri Lanka won the match to take the series into a decider. In the final match he took 1–55 as England lost the game and the series 3–2. Jordan was called up to the test team to face Sri Lanka following his impressive performances. In the first test, he took 5 wickets in the match but was unable to force a victory as the match ended in a draw. He was less impressive for the second match, failing to take a wicket as England lost by 100 runs.

Jordan was selected in the squad for the first test against India, but missed out as Ben Stokes returned from injury. He was also named in the squad for the second test. He played in his first game of the series in the third Test. He did not take a wicket in the match, but kept his place for the next match of the series. Here he was again not at his best, although he did take three wickets to help England go 2–1 up in the series. In the final test of the series, Jordan took 3–32 in the first innings, before making 20 with the bat. With England in a commanding position he took 4–18 in the second innings to help England win the match and the series 3–1. He played in the second ODI against India, although he did not perform well, finishing with figures of 0–73. He did not play again in the series.

Jordan was selected in the squad for the return series against Sri Lanka. He made his first appearance of the tour in the third ODI, where he took figures of 2–46. He took 2–35 in the next game, although England lost. In the fifth ODI he took another two wickets to keep England's hopes of winning the series alive. He proved expensive in the next game, finishing with figures of 2–68. He ended he tour by taking another two wickets, although England again lost to lose the series 5–2.

Jordan only played once in England's tri series against India and Australia, taking figures of 1–33 in the first match of the tournament against Australia. He made 17 with the bat but England suffered defeat. This proved to be Jordan's only game of the series.

=== 2015 World Cup ===
Jordan was overlooked at the start of the World Cup and did not play until England met Bangladesh in a must win game. Jordan took figures of 2–59 as Bangladesh posted 275. Jordan was later run out for a duck as England failed to chase the target and were eliminated. In the final game against Afghanistan Jordan picked up the man of the match award after picking up figures of 2–13 to help England win by nine wickets.

=== 2015 West Indies ===
Jordan kept his place in the team for the tour of West Indies. In the first innings of the first Test, he remained unbeaten on 21. After taking 1–46 in the first innings, he took 1–48 in the second innings as England were unable to force a result. In the second Test he took 2–65 in West Indies first innings and followed this up taking a wicket in the second innings to help England win the game. In the third Test he was less effective. He failed to take a wicket in the West Indies first innings as they were bowled out for 189. After England collapsed in their second innings, Jordan took 1–24 in the West Indies second innings but England lost the game by five wickets as the West Indies levelled the series at 1–1.

=== 2015 New Zealand and Pakistan ===
Although Jordan didn't play in the Test series, he returned to the fold for the ODI series. He picked up figures of 1–33 in the first match, as England secured an emphatic victory. However, he was expensive in the next match, taking figures of 1–97 as New Zealand posted 398 to secure a win on the D/L method. Jordan injured himself in the match and was ruled out of the rest of the series, which England went on to win 3–2.

After being left out of the matches against Australia, Jordan returned against Pakistan. Jordan played in the first T20 against Pakistan, finishing with figures of 0–37. After being rotated in the second match, he returned in the third match of the series and took figures of 3–23, as the scores were tied. Jordan was entrusted to bowl the Super Over and England won the match.

=== 2015–16 South Africa ===
After not playing in the South Africa ODI series, Jordan returned to the fold for the South Africa series. He played in the first three internationals, although had limited success. After taking 0–56 in England's win in the first ODI, he took figures of 0–33 in the second match of the series, which England also won. He took 1–54 in the next match, although was again expensive, going at over seven runs per over. Although he wasn't selected for the rest of the ODI series, he returned to the fold in the T20I series. He took 3–23 in the first match, but was expensive in the second, taking figures of 0–48.

=== 2016 World T20 ===
Jordan was a key member of the England T20 World Cup squad, playing every game in England's run to the final. He took figures of 0–24 against the West Indies, but was expensive against South Africa. He picked up his first wicket of the tournament as England beat Afghanistan, and then took match winning figures of 4–28 as England beat Sri Lanka to qualify for the semi-finals. Jordan continued to impress with his death bowling, taking figures of 1–24. In the final against West Indies, he took 0–36 as England narrowly lost and finished as runners-up.

=== 2016 Sri Lanka and Pakistan ===
He played in the third ODI against Sri Lanka and took figures of 1–49 as the match ended in a draw due to rain. He returned to the team for the fifth ODI, and took figures of 0–40 as England won by 122 runs. He played in the only T20I between the two teams, taking figures of 3–29 to help reduce Sri Lanka to 140 as England won by eight wickets.

Jordan played in the final two ODIS against Pakistan. In the fourth ODI he took figures of 2–42 as England restricted Pakistan to 247/8 and won the match by four wickets. In the final match of the series he finished with figures of 0–52 after making an unbeaten 15, as England lost the match by four wickets but won the series 4–1. Jordan only bowled one over in the T20I between the two teams, finishing with figures of 0–16 as England lost by nine wickets.

=== 2017 India ===
He was selected to play for the 2016–17 India tour. However he didn't make the starting eleven, but during the 3rd ODI he replaced the injured David Willey as a substitute fielder. Jordan took 1–27 in the first T20 against India, which England won by seven wickets. In the second T20I he took 3–22 to help restrict India to 144–8, although England lost by five runs. He was expensive in the final match of the series, taking figures of 1–56 as England lost by 75 runs to lose the series 2–1. Jordan was the leading wicket taker for England in T20's in this series.

=== 2019 and beyond ===
Jordan was selected for the T20Is series in WI 2019. He played the first T20I in which he had figures of 2-16(3). After this he was considered for selection in England's 2019 Cricket World Cup squad.

On 29 May 2020, Jordan was named in a 55-man group of players to begin training ahead of international fixtures starting in England following the COVID-19 pandemic. On 4 September 2020, in the opening T20I against Australia, Jordan played in his 50th T20I match. On 1 December 2020, in the third match against South Africa, Jordan became the leading wicket-taker for England in T20I cricket, taking his 66th dismissal. In September 2021, Jordan was named in England's squad for the 2021 ICC Men's T20 World Cup. In September 2022, Jordan was named in England's squad for the 2022 T20i world cup. Jordan did not play during the group stage but replaced an injured Mark Wood for the semi-final against India, in which he took 3-43, notably bowling three consecutive overs at the death. He then went on to play in the final against Pakistan in which he took 2–27 with England winning the match and tournament.

In May 2024, he was named in England’s squad for the 2024 ICC Men's T20 World Cup tournament. In England's first match against Scotland, he bowled 2 overs at the expense of 24 runs, before the game was washed out. In England's second match against Australia, he took 2 wickets in 4 overs, at the costly expense of 44 runs. He did not get a chance to bowl in England's third match against Oman. In England's fourth match against Namibia, he took 2 wickets in 2 overs at the expense of 19 runs. In England's Super Eight match against West Indies, he did not get a chance to bowl, nor did he get a chance to bowl in the second Super Eight match against South Africa. His best performance by far was against the USA. He bowled the 19th over of the match, during which he took 4 wickets in 5 balls. He managed to get Corey Anderson caught at long-on, and then managed a dot against Ali Khan. Then he bowled him out the very next ball. After that, he trapped Nosthush Kenjige lbw, followed by bowling Saurabh Netravalkar out, finishing up USA's lower order and getting a hat-trick.

== Franchise career ==
In 2016, following his success in ICC World T20 2016, he was signed as a replacement player for Royal Challengers Bangalore in place of the injured Mitchell Starc. He picked up 11 wickets from the 9 matches he played. His best figures 4/11 came against Gujarat Lions. He was released by the RCB ahead of the 2017 Auction.

In February 2017, he was selected by the defending champions Sunrisers Hyderabad for the 2017 Indian Premier League for 50 lakhs Rupees. He only managed to play one match against Kolkata Knight Riders in the eliminator. In the 2020 IPL auction, he was bought by the Kings XI Punjab for 3 crore ahead of the 2020 Indian Premier League. In February 2022, he was bought by the Chennai Super Kings in the auction for the 2022 Indian Premier League tournament.

In October 2016, Jordan was signed by Peshawar Zalmi for the 2017 PSL during the 2017 players draft in the gold category earning US$50,000. He played a major part in his team's debut title win, and as a result was retained in the silver category by the franchise for the next season. In December 2019, Jordan was signed by Karachi Kings in the Diamond category following the 2020 players draft for the 2020 Pakistan Super League played entirely in Pakistan. In January 2021, he was picked by Islamabad United for the 2021 Pakistan Super League following the 2021 PSL draft in the supplementary category, but was unable to play due to national duties. In December 2021, he was again picked by the Karachi Kings as their supplementary pick for the 2022 Pakistan Super League.

In November 2017, he was named for the Chittagong Vikings squad in Bangladesh Premier League where he played a few matches for the team. In September 2018, he was named in Paktia's squad in the first edition of the Afghanistan Premier League tournament. In January 2019, Jordan played for the Northern Knights in the 2018–19 Super Smash tournament in New Zealand.

In 2021, he was drafted by Southern Brave for the inaugural season of The Hundred. He was a key member of the title winning squad and contributed both with the bat and ball. He scored 54 runs and picked 9 wickets in 10 matches. In April 2022, he was bought by the Southern Brave for the 2022 season of The Hundred.

For the 2023–24 Big Bash League season, Jordan joined the Hobart Hurricanes.
