= 2022 North West Thunder season =

English cricket season

North West Thunder
2022 season
- Coach: Paul Shaw
- Captain: Eleanor Threlkeld
- Overseas player: (Cricket West Indies) Deandra Dottin
- RHFT: 7th
- CEC: Group B, 3rd
- Most runs: RHFT: Eleanor Threlkeld (266); CEC: Emma Lamb (191)
- Most wickets: RHFT: Alex Hartley (10); CEC: Hannah Jones (9)
- Most catches: RHFT: Laura Marshall (3); CEC: Hannah Jones (3)
- Most wicket-keeping dismissals: RHFT: Eleanor Threlkeld (11); CEC: Eleanor Threlkeld (6)

The 2022 season was North West Thunder's third season, in which they competed in the 50 over Rachael Heyhoe Flint Trophy and the Twenty20 Charlotte Edwards Cup. In the Charlotte Edwards Cup, the side finished third in Group B, winning two of their six matches. In the Rachael Heyhoe Flint Trophy, the side finished seventh in the group of eight, winning one of their matches.

The side was captained by Eleanor Threlkeld, who replaced Alex Hartley in the position at the start of the season, and coached by Paul Shaw. They played four home matches at Old Trafford Cricket Ground, two at Rookwood Cricket Ground, and one at Trafalgar Road Ground.

== Squad ==
=== Changes ===
On 29 October 2021, it was announced that Phoebe Graham had joined the side from Northern Diamonds, signing a professional contract. It was also announced that Laura Jackson had signed a professional contract, having previously been on a temporary contract. On 14 April 2022, it was announced that Alex Hartley was standing down as captain of the side. On 11 May 2022, North West Thunder announced their 20-player squad for the season, confirming the signing of Shachi Pai from Lightning, and the departure of overseas player Piepa Cleary to the same team. At the same time, it was confirmed that Eleanor Threlkeld was the new captain of the side. On 2 July 2022, it was announced that Deandra Dottin was joining the side as an overseas player for their first four Rachael Heyhoe Flint Trophy matches, which was later extended to cover the rest of the tournament. Georgie Boyce left the side in September 2022, joining Lightning.

=== Squad list ===
- Age given is at the start of North West Thunder's first match of the season (14 May 2022).

Name	Nationality	Birth date	Batting Style	Bowling Style	Notes
Batters
Georgie Boyce	England	4 October 1998 (aged 23)	Right-handed	Right-arm medium	Joined Lightning in September 2022
Danielle Collins	England	7 July 2000 (aged 21)	Left-handed	Right-arm medium	
Rebecca Duckworth	England	30 October 2000 (aged 21)	Right-handed	Right-arm medium	
Laura Marshall	England	1 November 1993 (aged 28)	Right-handed	Right-arm medium	
Daisy Mullan	England	29 November 2002 (aged 19)	Right-handed	Right-arm medium	
Shachi Pai	England	10 October 1998 (aged 23)	Right-handed	Right-arm medium	
All-rounders
Natalie Brown	England	16 October 1990 (aged 31)	Right-handed	Right-arm medium	
Deandra Dottin	West Indies	21 June 1991 (aged 30)	Right-handed	Right-arm medium	Overseas player; RHFT only
Liberty Heap	England	16 September 2003 (aged 18)	Right-handed	Right-arm off break	
Emma Lamb	England	16 December 1997 (aged 24)	Right-handed	Right-arm off break	
Wicket-keepers
Alice Clarke	England	4 August 2001 (aged 20)	Left-handed	Right-arm medium	
Seren Smale	Wales	13 December 2004 (aged 17)	Right-handed	—	
Eleanor Threlkeld	England	16 November 1998 (aged 23)	Right-handed	—	Captain
Bowlers
Kate Cross	England	3 October 1991 (aged 30)	Right-handed	Right-arm medium-fast	
Alice Dyson	England	28 January 1999 (aged 23)	Right-handed	Right-arm medium	
Sophie Ecclestone	England	6 May 1999 (aged 23)	Right-handed	Slow left-arm orthodox	
Phoebe Graham	England	23 October 1991 (aged 30)	Right-handed	Right-arm medium	
Alex Hartley	England	6 September 1993 (aged 28)	Right-handed	Slow left-arm orthodox	
Laura Jackson	England	27 December 1997 (aged 24)	Right-handed	Right-arm medium	
Hannah Jones	England	10 February 1999 (aged 23)	Left-handed	Slow left-arm orthodox	
Sophia Turner	England	23 April 2003 (aged 19)	Right-handed	Right-arm medium	

== Charlotte Edwards Cup ==
=== Group B ===
Pos	Team	Pld	W	L	T	NR	BP	Pts	NRR
1	Southern Vipers (Q)	6	6	0	0	0	3	27	1.400
2	Northern Diamonds	6	3	3	0	0	2	14	−0.102
3	North West Thunder	6	2	4	0	0	2	10	−0.190
4	Lightning	6	1	5	0	0	0	4	−1.072

Source: England and Wales Cricket Board
- advanced to the final

=== Fixtures ===
14 May 2022
14:30 BST
Scorecard

North West Thunder; 102/7 (20 overs)	v	Southern Vipers; 103/2 (13.3 overs)
Emma Lamb 23 (23); Freya Kemp 2/13 (4 overs)		Maia Bouchier 48* (33); Emma Lamb 1/6 (2 overs)

Southern Vipers won by 8 wickets
County Ground, Hove
Umpires: Sophie McLelland and Surendiran Shanmugam

- North West Thunder won the toss and elected to bat.
- Points: Southern Vipers 5, North West Thunder 0

18 May 2022
13:30 BST
Scorecard

North West Thunder; 148/7 (20 overs)	v	Northern Diamonds; 92 (20 overs)
Georgie Boyce 65 (56); Katie Levick 4/22 (4 overs)		Bess Heath 19 (14); Hannah Jones 3/23 (4 overs)

North West Thunder won by 56 runs
Rookwood Cricket Ground, Sale
Umpires: Grace Bambury and Graham Lloyd

- North West Thunder won the toss and elected to bat.
- Points: North West Thunder 5, Northern Diamonds 0

21 May 2022
14:30 BST
Scorecard

North West Thunder; 152/5 (20 overs)	v	Lightning; 155/5 (18.5 overs)
Georgie Boyce 71 (56); Piepa Cleary 3/34 (4 overs)		Tammy Beaumont 59 (38); Alex Hartley 1/13 (4 overs)

Lightning won by 5 wickets
Grace Road, Leicester
Umpires: Anna Harris and Rob White

- North West Thunder won the toss and elected to bat.
- Points: Lightning 4, North West Thunder 0

29 May 2022
11:00 BST
Scorecard

Northern Diamonds; 124 (20 overs)	v	North West Thunder; 99 (19 overs)
Sterre Kalis 28 (30); Hannah Jones 3/23 (4 overs)		Danielle Collins 26 (33); Katie Levick 3/25 (4 overs)

Northern Diamonds won by 25 runs
Headingley Cricket Ground, Headingley
Umpires: Anna Harris and David Millns

- Northern Diamonds won the toss and elected to bat.
- Points: Northern Diamonds 5, North West Thunder 0

1 June 2022
19:00 BST (D/N)
Scorecard

North West Thunder; 94/6 (20 overs)	v	Southern Vipers; 97/4 (15.3 overs)
Sophie Ecclestone 28* (32); Charlie Dean 3/16 (4 overs)		Georgia Elwiss 38* (35); Hannah Jones 1/10 (2 overs)

Southern Vipers won by 6 wickets
Old Trafford Cricket Ground, Manchester
Umpires: Joanne Ibbotson and Tim Robinson

- North West Thunder won the toss and elected to bat.
- Points: Southern Vipers 5, North West Thunder 0

3 June 2022
14:30 BST
Scorecard

Lightning; 103 (18 overs)	v	North West Thunder; 104/5 (15.2 overs)
Marie Kelly 21 (8); Sophie Ecclestone 5/15 (4 overs)		Emma Lamb 42 (35); Kathryn Bryce 2/24 (4 overs)

North West Thunder won by 5 wickets
Old Trafford Cricket Ground, Manchester
Umpires: Jasmine Naeem and Neil Pratt

- Lightning won the toss and elected to bat.
- Points: North West Thunder 5, Lightning 0

=== Tournament statistics ===
==== Batting ====
Player	Matches	Innings	Runs	Average	High score	100s	50s
Emma Lamb	6	6	191	31.83	56	0	2
Georgie Boyce	6	6	172	28.66	71	0	2
Danielle Collins	6	6	66	11.00	26	0	0

Source: ESPN Cricinfo Qualification: 50 runs.

==== Bowling ====
Player	Matches	Overs	Wickets	Average	Economy	BBI	5wi
Hannah Jones	6	19.0	9	13.00	6.15	3/23	0
Alex Hartley	6	21.3	6	20.66	5.76	2/17	0
Sophie Ecclestone	2	8.0	5	8.00	5.00	5/15	1

Source: ESPN Cricinfo Qualification: 5 wickets.

== Rachael Heyhoe Flint Trophy ==
=== Season standings ===
Pos	Team	Pld	W	L	T	NR	BP	Pts	NRR
1	Northern Diamonds (Q)	7	6	0	0	1	2	28	0.851
2	South East Stars (Q)	7	5	1	0	1	4	26	0.687
3	Southern Vipers (Q)	7	5	1	0	1	2	24	0.762
4	Western Storm	7	3	3	0	1	1	15	−0.214
5	Central Sparks	7	2	4	0	1	1	11	0.073
6	Lightning	7	2	4	0	1	1	11	−0.630
7	North West Thunder	7	1	5	0	1	0	6	−0.366
8	Sunrisers	7	0	6	0	1	0	2	−1.046

Source: England and Wales Cricket Board

advanced to final advanced to the play-off

=== Fixtures ===
3 July 2022
10:30 BST
Scorecard

North West Thunder; 235/7 (50 overs)	v	Northern Diamonds; 241/4 (42.2 overs)
Emma Lamb 82 (80); Linsey Smith 2/34 (10 overs)		Lauren Winfield-Hill 93 (72); Laura Jackson 2/67 (10 overs)

Northern Diamonds won by 6 wickets
Rookwood Cricket Ground, Sale
Umpires: Anna Harris and Hassan Adnan

- North West Thunder won the toss and elected to bat.
- Points: Northern Diamonds 4, North West Thunder 0

9 July 2022
10:30 BST
Scorecard

North West Thunder; 238/9 (50 overs)	v	Lightning; 241/5 (49.1 overs)
Eleanor Threlkeld 91 (117); Grace Ballinger 5/29 (10 overs)		Kathryn Bryce 109* (133); Laura Jackson 1/34 (8 overs)

Lightning won by 5 wickets
Haslegrave Ground, Loughborough
Umpires: Joanne Ibbotson and Surendiran Shanmugam

- North West Thunder won the toss and elected to bat.
- Points: Lightning 4, North West Thunder 0

16 July 2022
10:30 BST
Scorecard

South East Stars; 198 (47.5 overs)	v	North West Thunder; 146 (40.1 overs)
Lauren Smith 73* (93); Alex Hartley 6/24 (10 overs)		Georgie Boyce 68 (105); Bethan Miles 3/15 (6 overs)

South East Stars won by 52 runs
Trafalgar Road Ground, Southport
Umpires: Grace Bambury and Naeem Ashraf

- South East Stars won the toss and elected to bat.
- Points: South East Stars 5, North West Thunder 0

23 July 2022
14:00 BST (D/N)
Scorecard

North West Thunder; 236/9 (48 overs)	v	Central Sparks; 191 (41.4 overs)
Emma Lamb 68 (69); Emily Arlott 4/36 (10 overs)		Abigail Freeborn 72 (72); Emma Lamb 3/26 (7 overs)

North West Thunder won by 28 runs (DLS)
Old Trafford Cricket Ground, Manchester
Umpires: Jack Shantry and Sophie McLelland

- Central Sparks won the toss and elected to field.
- Match reduced to 48 overs per side due to rain.
- Central Sparks innings reduced to 43 overs due to rain; target was 220.
- Points: North West Thunder 4, Central Sparks 0

9 September 2022
10:30 BST

Sunrisers	v	North West Thunder

No Result
County Ground, Northampton

- The match was postponed due to the death of Queen Elizabeth II, and later deemed a no result with points shared.
- Points: Sunrisers 2, North West Thunder 2

11 September 2022
10:30 BST
Scorecard

North West Thunder; 203 (48.3 overs)	v	Southern Vipers; 204/6 (47 overs)
Eleanor Threlkeld 79 (117); Tara Norris 3/42 (10 overs)		Emily Windsor 59 (75); Phoebe Graham 2/32 (10 overs)

Southern Vipers won by 4 wickets
Rose Bowl, Southampton
Umpires: Alex Wharf and Fiona Richards

- North West Thunder won the toss and elected to bat.
- Points: Southern Vipers 4, North West Thunder 0

18 September 2022
10:30 BST
Scorecard

North West Thunder; 242/5 (50 overs)	v	Western Storm; 239/8 (44.3 overs)
Seren Smale 57 (93); Lauren Filer 3/46 (10 overs)		Danielle Gibson 56 (40); Laura Jackson 3/50 (10 overs)

Western Storm won by 2 wickets (DLS)
Old Trafford Cricket Ground, Manchester
Umpires: Naeem Ashraf and Grace Bambury

- Western Storm won the toss and elected to field.
- Western Storm innings reduced to 48 overs due to rain; target was 239.
- Points: Western Storm 4, North West Thunder 0

=== Tournament statistics ===
==== Batting ====
Player	Matches	Innings	Runs	Average	High score	100s	50s
Eleanor Threlkeld	6	6	266	53.20	91	0	2
Emma Lamb	3	3	213	71.00	82	0	3
Deandra Dottin	6	6	121	20.16	46	0	0

Source: ESPN Cricinfo Qualification: 100 runs.

==== Bowling ====
Player	Matches	Overs	Wickets	Average	Economy	BBI	5wi
Alex Hartley	4	39.0	10	14.20	3.64	6/24	1
Laura Jackson	6	46.0	7	34.00	5.17	3/50	0
Deandra Dottin	6	39.5	6	40.83	6.15	3/49	0
Hannah Jones	6	55.2	5	44.00	3.97	2/30	0

Source: ESPN Cricinfo Qualification: 5 wickets.

== Season statistics ==
=== Batting ===
Player	Rachael Heyhoe Flint Trophy								Charlotte Edwards Cup							
Player	Matches	Innings	Runs	High score	Average	Strike rate	100s	50s	Matches	Innings	Runs	High score	Average	Strike rate	100s	50s
Georgie Boyce	4	4	74	68	18.50	61.15	0	1	6	6	172	71	28.66	102.99	0	2
Natalie Brown	2	2	33	31	16.50	41.25	0	0	–	–	–	–	–	–	–	–
Danielle Collins	3	3	52	32	17.33	44.44	0	0	6	6	66	26	11.00	73.33	0	0
Kate Cross	1	1	38	38	38.00	95.00	0	0	3	3	33	18	11.00	89.18	0	0
Deandra Dottin	6	6	121	46	20.16	83.44	0	0	–	–	–	–	–	–	–	–
Rebecca Duckworth	1	1	15	15	15.00	48.38	0	0	–	–	–	–	–	–	–	–
Sophie Ecclestone	–	–	–	–	–	–	–	–	2	2	30	28*	30.00	83.33	0	0
Phoebe Graham	5	4	29	11	9.66	69.04	0	0	6	3	29	20	14.50	126.08	0	0
Alex Hartley	4	3	14	12*	14.00	100.00	0	0	6	1	0	0*	–	0.00	0	0
Liberty Heap	2	2	48	36*	48.00	141.17	0	0	–	–	–	–	–	–	–	–
Laura Jackson	6	5	35	13*	11.66	47.29	0	0	6	5	20	8*	10.00	71.42	0	0
Hannah Jones	6	4	17	6	8.50	53.12	0	0	6	1	1	1	1.00	25.00	0	0
Emma Lamb	3	3	213	82	71.00	92.20	0	3	6	6	191	56	31.83	109.77	0	2
Laura Marshall	3	3	57	41	19.00	73.07	0	0	4	4	17	11	5.66	73.91	0	0
Daisy Mullan	6	6	53	18	8.83	50.00	0	0	1	1	9	9*	–	90.00	0	0
Shachi Pai	5	5	68	41*	17.00	63.55	0	0	4	4	10	7	2.50	76.92	0	0
Seren Smale	2	2	57	57	28.50	60.63	0	1	–	–	–	–	–	–	–	–
Eleanor Threlkeld	6	6	266	91	53.20	70.74	0	2	6	6	46	18	9.20	63.88	0	0
Sophia Turner	1	–	–	–	–	–	–	–	4	3	9	7*	9.00	60.00	0	0
Source: ESPN Cricinfo

=== Bowling ===
Player	Rachael Heyhoe Flint Trophy							Charlotte Edwards Cup						
Player	Matches	Overs	Wickets	Average	Economy	BBI	5wi	Matches	Overs	Wickets	Average	Economy	BBI	5wi
Georgie Boyce	4	1.0	0	–	10.00	–	0	6	–	–	–	–	–	–
Natalie Brown	2	13.1	1	60.00	4.55	1/35	0	–	–	–	–	–	–	–
Kate Cross	1	8.4	2	11.50	2.65	2/23	0	3	10.0	2	38.00	7.60	1/23	0
Deandra Dottin	6	39.5	6	40.83	6.15	3/49	0	–	–	–	–	–	–	–
Sophie Ecclestone	–	–	–	–	–	–	–	2	8.0	5	8.00	5.00	5/15	1
Phoebe Graham	5	33.3	4	36.25	4.32	2/32	0	6	13.0	2	40.00	6.15	1/15	0
Alex Hartley	4	39.0	10	14.20	3.64	6/24	1	6	21.3	6	20.66	5.76	2/17	0
Liberty Heap	2	3.0	1	22.00	7.33	1/22	0	–	–	–	–	–	–	–
Laura Jackson	6	46.0	7	34.00	5.17	3/50	0	6	13.3	4	23.25	6.88	2/16	0
Hannah Jones	6	55.2	5	44.00	3.97	2/30	0	6	19.0	9	13.00	6.15	3/23	0
Emma Lamb	3	19.0	4	27.75	5.84	3/26	0	6	15.0	4	19.75	5.26	2/18	0
Shachi Pai	5	4.0	1	26.00	6.50	1/21	0	4	–	–	–	–	–	–
Sophia Turner	1	10.0	2	22.00	4.40	2/44	0	4	5.5	4	13.00	8.91	2/21	0
Source: ESPN Cricinfo

=== Fielding ===
Player	Rachael Heyhoe Flint Trophy			Charlotte Edwards Cup		
Player	Matches	Innings	Catches	Matches	Innings	Catches
Georgie Boyce	4	4	2	6	6	1
Natalie Brown	2	2	0	–	–	–
Danielle Collins	3	3	0	6	6	2
Kate Cross	1	1	1	3	3	1
Deandra Dottin	6	6	1	–	–	–
Rebecca Duckworth	1	1	0	–	–	–
Sophie Ecclestone	–	–	–	2	2	0
Phoebe Graham	5	5	2	6	6	2
Alex Hartley	4	4	1	6	6	1
Liberty Heap	2	2	0	–	–	–
Laura Jackson	6	6	1	6	6	2
Hannah Jones	6	6	2	6	6	3
Emma Lamb	3	3	0	6	6	2
Laura Marshall	3	3	3	4	4	1
Daisy Mullan	6	6	2	1	1	1
Shachi Pai	5	5	1	4	4	0
Seren Smale	2	2	0	–	–	–
Sophia Turner	1	1	0	4	4	0
Source: ESPN Cricinfo

=== Wicket-keeping ===
Player	Rachael Heyhoe Flint Trophy				Charlotte Edwards Cup			
Player	Matches	Innings	Catches	Stumpings	Matches	Innings	Catches	Stumpings
Eleanor Threlkeld	6	6	8	3	6	6	2	4
Source: ESPN Cricinfo
