= 2021 North West Thunder season =

North West Thunder
2021 season
- Coach: Paul Shaw
- Captain: Alex Hartley
- Overseas player: Piepa Cleary
- RHFT: 7th
- CEC: Group B, 3rd
- Most runs: RHFT: Emma Lamb (237); CEC: Emma Lamb (218)
- Most wickets: RHFT: Hannah Jones (14); CEC: Emma Lamb (9)
- Most catches: RHFT: Natalie Brown (3), Alex Hartley (3) & Hannah Jones (3); CEC: Emma Lamb (3)
- Most wicket-keeping dismissals: RHFT: Eleanor Threlkeld (10); CEC: Eleanor Threlkeld (4)

The 2021 season was North West Thunder's second season, in which they competed in the 50 over Rachael Heyhoe Flint Trophy and the new Twenty20 competition, the Charlotte Edwards Cup. The side finished seventh in the group stage of the Rachael Heyhoe Flint Trophy, winning three of their seven matches. In the Charlotte Edwards Cup, the side finished third in Group B, winning two of their six matches, with one ending in a tie.

The side was captained by Alex Hartley and coached by Paul Shaw. They played four home matches at Chester Boughton Hall Cricket Club, as well as one apiece at Old Trafford and Rookwood Cricket Ground.

== Squad ==
North West Thunder announced their initial 18-player squad on 27 May 2021. Seren Smale was promoted to the senior squad from the academy during the season, and played her first match on 10 September 2021. Age given is at the start of North West Thunder's first match of the season (29 May 2021).

Name	Nationality	Birth date	Batting Style	Bowling Style	Notes
Batters
Georgie Boyce	England	4 October 1998 (aged 22)	Right-handed	Right-arm medium	
Danielle Collins	England	7 July 2000 (aged 20)	Left-handed	Right-arm medium	
Rebecca Duckworth	England	30 October 2000 (aged 20)	Right-handed	Right-arm medium	
Laura Marshall	England	1 November 1993 (aged 27)	Right-handed	Right-arm medium	
All-rounders
Natalie Brown	England	16 October 1990 (aged 30)	Right-handed	Right-arm medium	
Piepa Cleary	Australia	17 July 1996 (aged 24)	Right-handed	Right-arm medium	Overseas player
Laura Jackson	England	27 December 1997 (aged 23)	Right-handed	Right-arm medium	
Emma Lamb	England	16 December 1997 (aged 23)	Right-handed	Right-arm off break	
Daisy Mullan	England	29 November 2002 (aged 18)	Right-handed	Right-arm medium	
Wicket-keepers
Alice Clarke	England	4 August 2001 (aged 19)	Left-handed	Right-arm medium	
Seren Smale	Wales	13 December 2004 (aged 16)	Right-handed	—	
Eleanor Threlkeld	England	16 November 1998 (aged 22)	Right-handed	—	
Bowlers
Kate Cross	England	3 October 1991 (aged 29)	Right-handed	Right-arm medium-fast	
Alice Dyson	England	28 January 1999 (aged 22)	Right-handed	Right-arm medium	
Sophie Ecclestone	England	6 May 1999 (aged 22)	Right-handed	Slow left-arm orthodox	
Alex Hartley	England	6 September 1993 (aged 27)	Right-handed	Slow left-arm orthodox	Captain
Liberty Heap	England	16 September 2003 (aged 17)	Right-handed	Right-arm off break	
Hannah Jones	England	10 February 1999 (aged 22)	Left-handed	Slow left-arm orthodox	
Sophia Turner	England	23 April 2003 (aged 18)	Right-handed	Right-arm medium	

== Rachael Heyhoe Flint Trophy ==
=== Season standings ===
Pos	Team	Pld	W	L	T	NR	BP	Pts	NRR
1	Southern Vipers (Q)	7	6	1	0	0	3	27	0.417
2	Northern Diamonds (Q)	7	5	2	0	0	3	23	1.182
3	Central Sparks (Q)	7	5	2	0	0	2	22	0.822
4	Lightning	7	3	4	0	0	1	13	0.274
5	South East Stars	7	3	4	0	0	1	13	−0.226
6	Western Storm	7	3	4	0	0	1	13	−0.462
7	North West Thunder	7	3	4	0	0	1	13	−0.620
8	Sunrisers	7	0	7	0	0	0	0	−1.598

Source: ESPN Cricinfo

Advanced to the final
Advanced to the play-off

=== Fixtures ===
29 May 2021
10:30 BST
Scorecard

North West Thunder; 291/8 (50 overs)	v	Western Storm; 295/9 (50 overs)
Emma Lamb 121 (105); Anya Shrubsole 3/29 (10 overs)		Heather Knight 91 (90); Kate Cross 3/35 (10 overs)

Western Storm won by 1 wicket
County Ground, Bristol
Umpires: Sarah Bartlett and Yvonne Dolphin-Cooper

- Western Storm won the toss and elected to field.
- Points: Western Storm 4, North West Thunder 0

31 May 2021
10:30 BST
Scorecard

North West Thunder; 247/9 (50 overs)	v	Sunrisers; 211 (45.2 overs)
Georgie Boyce 91 (117); Sonali Patel 4/40 (7 overs)		Fran Wilson 50 (45); Sophie Ecclestone 3/28 (9.2 overs)

North West Thunder won by 36 runs
Chester Boughton Hall Cricket Club, Chester
Umpires: Jasmine Naeem and Neil Pratt

- North West Thunder won the toss and elected to bat.
- Points: North West Thunder 4, Sunrisers 0

6 June 2021
10:30 BST
Scorecard

Lightning; 259/5 (50 overs)	v	North West Thunder; 125 (39.2 overs)
Tammy Beaumont 89 (101); Sophie Ecclestone 2/23 (10 overs)		Emma Lamb 42 (58); Kirstie Gordon 4/23 (10 overs)

Lightning won by 134 runs
Chester Boughton Hall Cricket Club, Chester
Umpires: Jasmine Naeem and Sue Redfern

- Lightning won the toss and elected to bat.
- Points: Lightning 5, North West Thunder 0

12 June 2021
10:30 BST
Scorecard

Central Sparks; 203 (49.5 overs)	v	North West Thunder; 205/8 (48 overs)
Evelyn Jones 100* (150); Hannah Jones 3/33 (10 overs)		Emma Lamb 39 (47); Georgia Davis 3/42 (10 overs)

North West Thunder won by 2 wickets
New Road, Worcester
Umpires: Rob White and Yvonne Dolphin-Cooper

- Central Sparks won the toss and elected to bat.
- Points: North West Thunder 4, Central Sparks 0

10 September 2021
10:30 BST
Scorecard

North West Thunder; 110 (32.5 overs)	v	Southern Vipers; 112/7 (33.5 overs)
Kate Cross 57 (86); Tara Norris 4/14 (7.5 overs)		Ella McCaughan 41 (47); Hannah Jones 2/9 (5 overs)

Southern Vipers won by 3 wickets
Rookwood Cricket Ground, Sale
Umpires: Mike Burns and Joanne Ibbotson

- Southern Vipers won the toss and elected to field.
- Points: Southern Vipers 5, North West Thunder 0

12 September 2021
10:30 BST
Scorecard

Northern Diamonds; 294/6 (50 overs)	v	North West Thunder; 189/8 (50 overs)
Bess Heath 78* (65); Alex Hartley 2/57 (10 overs)		Georgie Boyce 67 (100); Katie Levick 4/34 (10 overs)

Northern Diamonds won by 105 runs
Riverside Ground, Chester-le-Street
Umpires: Hassan Adnan and Joanne Ibbotson

- North West Thunder won the toss and elected to field.
- Points: Northern Diamonds 5, North West Thunder 0

18 September 2021
10:30 BST
Scorecard

North West Thunder; 185 (47 overs)	v	South East Stars; 130 (35 overs)
Eleanor Threlkeld 70* (92); Danielle Gregory 2/23 (10 overs)		Kalea Moore 35 (59); Hannah Jones 5/33 (9 overs)

North West Thunder won by 55 runs
County Cricket Ground, Beckenham
Umpires: Sarah Bartlett and Mark Newell

- North West Thunder won the toss and elected to bat.
- Points: North West Thunder 5, South East Stars 0

=== Tournament statistics ===
==== Batting ====
Player	Matches	Innings	Runs	Average	High score	100s	50s
Emma Lamb	6	5	237	47.40	121	1	0
Georgie Boyce	7	7	232	33.14	91	0	2
Eleanor Threlkeld	7	7	127	21.16	70*	0	1
Kate Cross	4	4	109	36.33	57	0	1

Source: ESPN Cricinfo Qualification: 100 runs.

==== Bowling ====
Player	Matches	Overs	Wickets	Average	Economy	BBI	5wi
Hannah Jones	7	50.0	14	17.07	4.78	5/33	1
Alex Hartley	7	68.5	10	29.50	4.28	2/17	0
Sophie Ecclestone	3	29.2	8	14.25	3.88	3/28	0
Kate Cross	4	39.0	8	21.25	4.35	3/35	0

Source: ESPN Cricinfo Qualification: 5 wickets.

== Charlotte Edwards Cup ==
=== Group B ===
Pos	Team	Pld	W	L	T	NR	BP	Pts	NRR
1	Northern Diamonds (Q)	6	4	2	0	0	1	17	0.655
2	Western Storm	6	4	2	0	0	1	17	0.182
3	North West Thunder	6	2	3	1	0	1	11	0.029
4	Sunrisers	6	1	4	1	0	0	6	−0.871

Source: ESPN Cricinfo
- Advanced to the semi-final

=== Fixtures ===
26 June 2021
14:30 BST
Scorecard

North West Thunder; 118/6 (20 overs)	v	Northern Diamonds; 106/9 (20 overs)
Emma Lamb 58 (43); Beth Langston 2/32 (4 overs)		Sterre Kalis 32 (37); Emma Lamb 4/13 (4 overs)

North West Thunder won by 12 runs
Headingley, Leeds
Umpires: James Middlebrook and Lina Nenova

- North West Thunder won the toss and elected to bat.
- Points: North West Thunder 4, Northern Diamonds 0

4 July 2021
11:00 BST
Scorecard

North West Thunder; 110/8 (20 overs)	v	Western Storm; 36/1 (3.1 overs)
Emma Lamb 21 (19); Lauren Parfitt 2/15 (4 overs)		Fi Morris 19 (8); Emma Lamb 1/11 (1 over)

Western Storm won by 9 wickets (DLS)
Chester Boughton Hall Cricket Club, Chester
Umpires: Anna Harris and Jasmine Naeem

- North West Thunder won the toss and elected to bat.
- Western Storm were set a revised target of 33 runs from 5 overs due to rain.
- Points: Western Storm 5, North West Thunder 0

9 July 2021
14:30 BST
Scorecard

North West Thunder; 186/1 (20 overs)	v	Sunrisers; 115 (20 overs)
Emma Lamb 111* (61); Gayatri Gole 1/37 (4 overs)		Cordelia Griffith 34 (33); Emma Lamb 3/16 (4 overs)

North West Thunder won by 71 runs
Old Trafford, Manchester
Umpires: Joanne Ibbotson and Neil Pratt

- Sunrisers won the toss and elected to field.
- Points: North West Thunder 5, Sunrisers 0

25 August 2021
14:30 BST
Scorecard

North West Thunder; 100/9 (20 overs)	v	Western Storm; 101/3 (17.4 overs)
Emma Lamb 28 (20); Nicole Harvey 3/13 (4 overs)		Katie George 47* (46); Hannah Jones 1/22 (4 overs); Alex Hartley 1/22 (4 overs)

Western Storm won by 7 wickets
Sophia Gardens, Cardiff
Umpires: Anna Harris and Sue Redfern

- Western Storm won the toss and elected to field.
- Points: Western Storm 4, North West Thunder 0

28 August 2021
14:30 BST
Scorecard

North West Thunder; 124/5 (20 overs)	v	Sunrisers; 124/4 (20 overs)
Georgie Boyce 31 (27); Emily Thorpe 2/17 (4 overs)		Cordelia Griffith 63 (51); Kate Cross 2/20 (4 overs)

Match tied
County Ground, Northampton
Umpires: Hassan Adnan and Sue Redfern

- North West Thunder won the toss and elected to bat.
- Points: North West Thunder 2, Sunrisers 2

30 August 2021
14:30 BST
Scorecard

North West Thunder; 90/9 (20 overs)	v	Northern Diamonds; 92/2 (12.2 overs)
Danielle Collins 16 (25); Jenny Gunn 4/15 (4 overs)		Bess Heath 58* (40); Alice Dyson 1/9 (1 over)

Northern Diamonds won by 8 wickets
Chester Boughton Hall Cricket Club, Chester
Umpires: Jasmine Naeem and Billy Taylor

- Northern Diamonds won the toss and elected to field.
- Points: Northern Diamonds 5, North West Thunder 0

=== Tournament statistics ===
==== Batting ====
Player	Matches	Innings	Runs	Average	High score	100s	50s
Emma Lamb	4	4	218	72.66	111*	1	1
Eleanor Threlkeld	6	6	102	20.40	28	0	0
Georgie Boyce	6	6	87	14.50	34	0	0

Source: ESPN Cricinfo Qualification: 50 runs.

==== Bowling ====
Player	Matches	Overs	Wickets	Average	Economy	BBI	5wi
Emma Lamb	4	13.0	9	7.33	5.07	4/13	0

Source: ESPN Cricinfo Qualification: 5 wickets.

== Season statistics ==
=== Batting ===
Player	Rachael Heyhoe Flint Trophy								Charlotte Edwards Cup							
Player	Matches	Innings	Runs	High score	Average	Strike rate	100s	50s	Matches	Innings	Runs	High score	Average	Strike rate	100s	50s
Georgie Boyce	7	7	232	91	33.14	67.44	0	2	6	6	87	34	14.50	89.69	0	0
Natalie Brown	7	7	62	24	8.85	49.20	0	0	3	2	26	25	13.00	76.47	0	0
Piepa Cleary	4	4	93	79	23.25	62.83	0	1	3	2	16	13	8.00	59.25	0	0
Danielle Collins	4	4	15	8*	7.50	41.66	0	0	5	5	27	16	9.00	57.44	0	0
Kate Cross	4	4	109	57	36.33	70.77	0	1	4	3	46	26	15.33	124.32	0	0
Rebecca Duckworth	1	1	1	1	1.00	8.33	0	0	1	1	1	1	1.00	25.00	0	0
Alice Dyson	3	3	22	13	7.33	28.20	0	0	2	2	7	7	3.50	53.84	0	0
Sophie Ecclestone	3	3	50	37	16.66	87.71	0	0	–		–	–	–	–	–	–
Alex Hartley	7	6	41	26	13.66	70.68	0	0	6	3	7	6	3.50	58.33	0	0
Liberty Heap	1	1	19	19	19.00	73.07	0	0	–	–	–	–	–	–	–	–
Laura Jackson	4	4	58	30	14.50	50.43	0	0	6	4	31	12	15.50	60.78	0	0
Hannah Jones	7	5	24	9	12.00	46.15	0	0	6	1	2	2*	–	50.00	0	0
Emma Lamb	6	5	237	121	47.40	87.45	1	0	4	4	218	111*	72.66	152.44	1	1
Laura Marshall	7	7	90	42	12.85	72.00	0	0	6	5	38	19	9.50	67.85	0	0
Daisy Mullan	2	2	8	8	4.00	21.05	0	0	4	3	42	26	14.00	67.74	0	0
Seren Smale	3	3	25	13	8.33	42.37	0	0	–	–	–	–	–	–	–	–
Eleanor Threlkeld	7	7	127	70*	21.16	60.18	0	1	6	6	102	28	20.40	80.31	0	0
Sophia Turner	–	–	–	–	–	–	–	–	4	2	8	7*	–	66.66	0	0
Source: ESPN Cricinfo

=== Bowling ===
Player	Rachael Heyhoe Flint Trophy							Charlotte Edwards Cup						
Player	Matches	Overs	Wickets	Average	Economy	BBI	5wi	Matches	Overs	Wickets	Average	Economy	BBI	5wi
Natalie Brown	7	10.2	1	66.00	6.38	1/55	0	3	5.0	1	40.00	8.00	1/23	0
Piepa Cleary	4	31.0	2	82.50	5.32	1/40	0	3	7.0	2	21.50	6.14	2/20	0
Kate Cross	4	39.0	8	21.25	4.35	3/35	0	4	14.4	4	21.50	5.86	2/20	0
Alice Dyson	3	14.0	2	42.50	6.07	1/26	0	2	1.0	1	9.00	9.00	1/9	0
Sophie Ecclestone	3	29.2	8	14.25	3.88	3/28	0	–	–	–	–	–	–	–
Alex Hartley	7	68.5	10	29.50	4.28	2/17	0	6	18.2	2	57.50	6.27	1/21	0
Liberty Heap	1	6.0	1	41.00	6.83	1/14	0	–	–	–	–	–	–	–
Laura Jackson	4	27.5	4	32.50	4.67	3/35	0	6	8.0	1	69.00	8.62	1/12	0
Hannah Jones	7	50.0	14	17.07	4.78	5/33	1	6	19.1	4	22.25	4.64	1/12	0
Emma Lamb	6	37.4	3	54.00	4.30	1/13	0	4	13.0	9	7.33	5.07	4/13	0
Sophia Turner	–	–	–	–	–	–	–	4	7.0	1	37.00	5.28	1/4	0
Source: ESPN Cricinfo

=== Fielding ===
Player	Rachael Heyhoe Flint Trophy			Charlotte Edwards Cup		
Player	Matches	Innings	Catches	Matches	Innings	Catches
Georgie Boyce	7	7	0	6	6	0
Natalie Brown	7	7	3	3	3	1
Piepa Cleary	4	4	2	3	3	1
Danielle Collins	4	4	0	5	5	0
Kate Cross	4	4	0	4	4	2
Rebecca Duckworth	1	1	0	1	1	0
Alice Dyson	3	3	0	2	2	0
Sophie Ecclestone	3	3	2	–	–	–
Alex Hartley	7	7	3	6	6	2
Liberty Heap	1	1	1	–	–	–
Laura Jackson	4	4	2	6	6	2
Hannah Jones	7	7	3	6	6	0
Emma Lamb	6	6	2	4	4	3
Laura Marshall	7	7	2	6	6	1
Daisy Mullan	2	2	1	4	4	0
Seren Smale	3	3	1	–	–	–
Sophia Turner	–	–	–	4	4	0
Source: ESPN Cricinfo

=== Wicket-keeping ===
Player	Rachael Heyhoe Flint Trophy				Charlotte Edwards Cup			
Player	Matches	Innings	Catches	Stumpings	Matches	Innings	Catches	Stumpings
Eleanor Threlkeld	7	7	8	2	6	6	2	2
Source: ESPN Cricinfo
