= Shachi Pai =

Indian-born cricketer (born 1998)

Personal information
- Full name: Shachi Pai
- Born: 10 October 1998 (age 28); Mumbai, India
- Batting: Right-handed
- Bowling: Right-arm medium
- Role: Batter

Domestic team information
- Years: Team
- 2013–2019: Lancashire
- 2019: → Cumbria (on loan)
- 2020: Nottinghamshire
- 2020–2021: Lightning
- 2021: Derbyshire
- 2022–present: Lancashire
- 2022: North Representative XI
- 2022–2024: North West Thunder

Career statistics
Competition	WLA	WT20
Matches	37	48
Runs scored	335	347
Batting average	12.40	10.84
100s/50s	0/1	0/0
Top score	54	34
Balls bowled	89	216
Wickets	2	3
Bowling average	35.00	65.00
5 wickets in innings	0	0
10 wickets in match	0	0
Best bowling	1/6	1/13
Catches/stumpings	7/–	7/–
- Source: CricketArchive, 17 October 2024

Shachi Pai (born 10 October 1998) is an Indian-born cricketer who currently plays for Lancashire. She plays as a right-handed batter. She previously played for Derbyshire, North Representative XI, Lightning and North West Thunder.

== Domestic career ==
Pai made her county debut in 2013, for Lancashire against Warwickshire. She became a more of a regular for the side from 2016, and in 2017 she was part of the Lancashire side that won the double of the County Championship and Twenty20 Cup. In 2018 she achieved her List A high score, hitting 36 against Somerset. In 2019, Pai played mostly for Lancashire, but also appeared in one match for Cumbria.

Pai joined Nottinghamshire in 2020, a side she played age group cricket for, but did not make an appearance for them due to the COVID-19 pandemic. In April 2021, Pai was announced in the Derbyshire squad for the 2021 Women's Twenty20 Cup. She made 86 runs for the side that season, including her Twenty20 high score of 34, made against Shropshire. In 2022, she played for North Representative XI in the 2022 Women's Twenty20 Cup, scoring 45 runs.

In 2020, Pai played for Lightning in the Rachael Heyhoe Flint Trophy. She appeared in 4 matches, scoring 23 runs. She played seven matches for the side in 2021 across the Rachael Heyhoe Flint Trophy and the Charlotte Edwards Cup, with a top score of 24 in a T20 against South East Stars.

In 2022, Pai was named in North West Thunder's squad for their pre-season tour of Dubai. She went on to appear nine times for North West Thunder in the 2022 season, across the Charlotte Edwards Cup and the Rachael Heyhoe Flint Trophy, with a top score of 41* against Northern Diamonds. She was again in North West Thunder's squad for the 2023 season, but did not play a match. In 2024, she played one match for North West Thunder, in the Rachael Heyhoe Flint Trophy.
