= Laura Marshall =

English cricketer (born 1993)

Personal information
- Full name: Laura Marshall
- Born: 1 November 1993 (age 33); Barrow-in-Furness, Cumbria, England
- Batting: Right-handed
- Bowling: Right-arm medium
- Role: Batter

Domestic team information
- Years: Team
- 2008–2011: Cumbria
- 2012–2016: Lancashire
- 2016: Lancashire Thunder
- 2019–present: Lancashire
- 2019–2022: Cumbria
- 2020–2023: North West Thunder

Career statistics
| Competition | WLA | WT20 |
|---|---|---|
| Matches | 61 | 47 |
| Runs scored | 853 | 477 |
| Batting average | 16.09 | 13.25 |
| 100s/50s | 0/2 | 0/1 |
| Top score | 88 | 51 |
| Balls bowled | 420 | 36 |
| Wickets | 13 | 2 |
| Bowling average | 17.46 | 13.00 |
| 5 wickets in innings | 0 | 0 |
| 10 wickets in match | 0 | 0 |
| Best bowling | 3/6 | 1/7 |
| Catches/stumpings | 21/– | 10/– |
- Source: CricketArchive, 16 October 2023

Laura Marshall (born 1 November 1993) is an English cricketer who currently plays for Lancashire. She plays as a right-handed batter. She has previously played for Cumbria, Lancashire Thunder and North West Thunder.

== Early life ==
Marshall was born on 1 November 1993 in Barrow-in-Furness, Cumbria.

== Domestic career ==
Marshall made her county debut in 2008, for Cumbria against Scotland. Her best season for Cumbria came in the 2010 Women's County Championship, where she hit 87 runs at an average of 21.75, with a high score of 47*.

Marshall moved to Lancashire ahead of the 2012 season, and in 2013 she scored 224 runs in the County Championship, including her List A high score of 88, made against Durham. In 2015, Marshall hit her Twenty20 high score, scoring 46 off 41 balls against the Netherlands.

Marshall took a break from cricket following the 2016 season, and only returned to play for Lancashire in 2019. Her best innings came in the one match she played for Cumbria, however, as she hit 78 against Staffordshire. In 2021, it was confirmed that Marshall is dual-registered with both Lancashire and Cumbria, and would be part of the Cumbria squad for the upcoming season. She played four matches for the side in the 2021 Women's Twenty20 Cup, scoring 90 runs including her maiden half-century, 51 against Yorkshire. She played four matches for Cumbria in the 2022 Women's Twenty20 Cup, scoring 38 runs.

Marshall also played for Lancashire Thunder in the 2016 Women's Cricket Super League. She appeared in 3 matches, and scored 9 runs.

In 2020, Marshall played for North West Thunder in the Rachael Heyhoe Flint Trophy. She appeared in all six matches, scoring 61 runs at an average of 10.16. She was ever-present for the side in 2021 in the Rachael Heyhoe Flint Trophy and the Charlotte Edwards Cup, with a top score of 42 from 40 balls made against Northern Diamonds. She played seven matches for North West Thunder in 2022, across the Charlotte Edwards Cup and the Rachael Heyhoe Flint Trophy, with a top-score of 41 against Central Sparks. She was again in North West Thunder's squad for the 2023 season, but did not play a match.
