= Laura Jackson (cricketer) =

English cricketer (born 1997)

Personal information
- Full name: Laura Elizabeth Jackson
- Born: 27 December 1997 (age 28); Ormskirk, Lancashire, England
- Batting: Right-handed
- Bowling: Right-arm medium
- Role: All-rounder

Domestic team information
- Years: Team
- 2015: Cheshire
- 2016–2024: Lancashire
- 2019: Cumbria
- 2020–2024: North West Thunder
- 2021–2023: Manchester Originals
- 2022: Cumbria
- 2025: Somerset

Career statistics
Competition	WLA	WT20
Matches	37	59
Runs scored	197	280
Batting average	9.38	15.55
100s/50s	0/0	0/1
Top score	30	53
Balls bowled	1,315	883
Wickets	42	42
Bowling average	20.40	19.47
5 wickets in innings	1	0
10 wickets in match	0	0
Best bowling	7/9	3/5
Catches/stumpings	10/–	10/–
- Source: CricketArchive, 17 October 2024

Laura Elizabeth Jackson (born 27 December 1997) is an English cricketer who currently plays for Somerset and Manchester Originals. An all-rounder, she is a right-handed batter and right-arm medium bowler. She has previously played for Cheshire, Cumbria, Lancashire and North West Thunder.

== Domestic career ==
Jackson made her county debut in 2015, for Cheshire against Oxfordshire. She took six wickets in her first County Championship season, at an average of 16.50.

Jackson joined Lancashire ahead of the 2016 season, but did not become a regular for the side until the 2018 season. She was the side's leading wicket-taker in the 2018 Women's Twenty20 Cup, with 9 wickets at an average of 15.33. In 2019, Jackson played one County Championship match for Cumbria, against Scotland, and took 7 wickets for 9 runs off her 10 overs, all bowled, as Scotland were all out for 72. Due to this performance, she was Cumbria's leading wicket-taker in the County Championship. She was also Lancashire's leading wicket-taker in the Twenty20 Cup, with 6 wickets at an average of 14.66. She took two wickets for the side at an average of 11.50 in the 2021 Women's Twenty20 Cup. Jackson played for Cumbria in the 2022 Women's Twenty20 Cup, taking three wickets at an average of 29.00. She played four matches for Lancashire in the 2023 Women's Twenty20 Cup, taking five wickets and scoring her maiden Twenty20 half-century, with 53 against Cumbria.

In 2020, Jackson played for North West Thunder in the Rachael Heyhoe Flint Trophy. She appeared in three matches, scoring 23 runs and taking 2 wickets at an average of 21.50. Her best performance came against Northern Diamonds, where she hit 22 runs and took 2/23 from 9 overs. In 2021, she took four wickets for the side in the Rachael Heyhoe Flint Trophy and one in the Charlotte Edwards Cup. She also played four matches for Manchester Originals in The Hundred, taking four wickets. At the end of the 2021 season, it was announced that Jackson had signed a professional contract with North West Thunder. She played 12 matches for North West Thunder in 2022, across the Charlotte Edwards Cup and the Rachael Heyhoe Flint Trophy, taking 11 wickets. She was again in the Manchester Originals squad in The Hundred, but did not play a match.

In 2023, she played four matches for North West Thunder, taking five wickets at an average of 20.20. She was also again in the Manchester Originals squad for The Hundred, but did not play a match. In 2024, she played one match for North West Thunder.

On 22 January 2025 it was announced Jackson had signed a one-year professional deal with Somerset.
