= Sophia Turner =

English cricketer

Personal information
- Full name: Sophia Turner
- Born: 23 April 2003 (age 23); Blackburn, Lancashire, England
- Batting: Right-handed
- Bowling: Right-arm medium
- Role: Bowler

Domestic team information
- Years: Team
- 2020–2023: North West Thunder
- 2023: → Northern Diamonds (on loan)
- 2021–2023: Lancashire
- 2021: North Representative XI
- 2024: Northern Diamonds

Career statistics
Competition	WLA	WT20
Matches	13	29
Runs scored	30	108
Batting average	4.28	27.00
100s/50s	0/0	0/1
Top score	7	65*
Balls bowled	410	449
Wickets	12	19
Bowling average	34.00	24.36
5 wickets in innings	0	0
10 wickets in match	0	0
Best bowling	2/26	2/5
Catches/stumpings	2/–	14/–
- Source: CricketArchive, 17 October 2024

Sophia Turner (born 23 April 2003) is an English cricketer who most recently played for Lancashire and Northern Diamonds. She plays primarily as a right-arm medium bowler. She has previously played for North West Thunder.

== Early life ==
Turner was born on 23 April 2003 in Blackburn, Lancashire.

== Domestic career ==
In 2020, Turner played for North West Thunder in the Rachael Heyhoe Flint Trophy. She appeared in two matches, scoring three runs overall.

In 2021, Turner was named as part of the Lancashire contingent of the North Representative XI squad for the Twenty20 Cup. She was the side's leading wicket-taker in the tournament, with 5 wickets at an average of 16.00. She also played four matches for North West Thunder in the 2021 Charlotte Edwards Cup, including bowling "brilliantly" in one match against Northern Diamonds to bowl four overs for four runs, with one wicket.

She played for Lancashire in the 2022 Women's Twenty20 Cup, taking four wickets at an average of 30.50. She played also played five matches for North West Thunder in 2022, across the Charlotte Edwards Cup and the Rachael Heyhoe Flint Trophy, taking six wickets.

In 2023, she played three matches for Lancashire in the 2023 Women's Twenty20 Cup, including scoring 65* against Scotland. She did not play for North West Thunder in 2023, but did go on loan to Northern Diamonds in September, playing two matches and taking two wickets. In November 2023, it was announced that Turner had signed permanently for Northern Diamonds. In 2024, she played 14 matches for Northern Diamonds, across the Rachael Heyhoe Flint Trophy and the Charlotte Edwards Cup, taking 12 wickets.
