= 2022 Charlotte Edwards Cup =

English cricket season

- Dates: 14 May 2022 – 11 June 2022
- Administrator(s): England and Wales Cricket Board
- Cricket format: Twenty20
- Tournament format(s): Group stage and knockout
- Champions: Southern Vipers (1st title)
- Participants: 8
- Matches: 26
- Player of the series: Amy Jones (Sparks)
- Most runs: Amy Jones (289)
- Most wickets: Katie Levick (15)
- Official website: ECB

The 2022 Charlotte Edwards Cup was the second edition of the Charlotte Edwards Cup, an English women's cricket Twenty20 domestic competition, which took place between 14 May and 11 June 2022. It featured eight teams playing in two double round-robin groups, followed by a Finals Day. The tournament ran alongside the Rachael Heyhoe Flint Trophy. The tournament was named after former England captain Charlotte Edwards. The tournament was won by Southern Vipers, beating Central Sparks in the final.

== Format ==
Teams played in two groups, based on finishing positions in the 2021 edition of the tournament. Teams played each team in their group twice, home and away, with the two group winners and the best second-place team advancing to Finals Day, played at the County Ground, Northampton. The best group winner advanced straight to the final, whilst the other two teams played off in a semi-final.

== Teams ==
The teams were as follows:

- Central Sparks (representing Warwickshire, Worcestershire, Herefordshire, Shropshire and Staffordshire)
- Lightning (representing Loughborough University, Derbyshire, Leicestershire, Nottinghamshire and Lincolnshire)
- Northern Diamonds (representing Yorkshire, Durham and Northumberland)
- North West Thunder (representing Lancashire, Cheshire and Cumbria)
- South East Stars (representing Surrey and Kent)
- Southern Vipers (representing Hampshire, Sussex, Berkshire, Buckinghamshire, Dorset, Isle of Wight and Oxfordshire)
- Sunrisers (representing Middlesex, Essex, Northamptonshire, Bedfordshire, Cambridgeshire, Hertfordshire, Huntingdonshire, Norfolk and Suffolk)
- Western Storm (representing Glamorgan, Gloucestershire, Somerset, Cornwall, Devon, Wiltshire and Cricket Wales)

== Standings ==
Teams received 4 points for a win. A bonus point was given where the winning team's run rate was 1.25 or greater times that of the opposition. In case of a tie in the standings, the following tiebreakers were applied in order: highest net run rate, team that scored the most points in matches involving the tied parties, better bowling strike rate, drawing of lots.

=== Group A ===
Pos	Team	Pld	W	L	T	NR	BP	Pts	NRR
1	South East Stars (Q)	6	5	1	0	0	1	21	0.660
2	Central Sparks (Q)	6	4	2	0	0	1	17	0.552
3	Western Storm	6	3	3	0	0	1	13	0.148
4	Sunrisers	6	0	6	0	0	0	0	−1.287

Source: England and Wales Cricket Board
(Q) Qualified for the phase indicated

=== Group B ===
Pos	Team	Pld	W	L	T	NR	BP	Pts	NRR
1	Southern Vipers (Q)	6	6	0	0	0	3	27	1.400
2	Northern Diamonds	6	3	3	0	0	2	14	−0.102
3	North West Thunder	6	2	4	0	0	2	10	−0.190
4	Lightning	6	1	5	0	0	0	4	−1.072

Source: England and Wales Cricket Board
(Q) Qualified for the phase indicated
- advanced to the final
- advanced to the semi-final

== Fixtures ==
=== Group A ===
14 May 2022
14:30 BST
Scorecard

Central Sparks; 156/4 (20 overs)	v	Western Storm; 136/6 (20 overs)
Amy Jones 52 (44); Danielle Gibson 2/37 (4 overs)		Sophie Luff 43 (29); Issy Wong 2/28 (4 overs)

Central Sparks won by 20 runs
Sophia Gardens, Cardiff
Umpires: Anna Harris and Hassan Adnan

- Western Storm won the toss and elected to field.
- Points: Central Sparks 4, Western Storm 0

14 May 2022
14:30 BST
Scorecard

Sunrisers; 122/6 (20 overs)	v	South East Stars; 123/4 (16.5 overs)
Cordelia Griffith 26 (28); Emma Jones 1/2 (1 over)		Aylish Cranstone 56* (46); Jo Gardner 1/15 (3 overs)

South East Stars won by 6 wickets
County Ground, Chelmsford
Umpires: Neil Pratt and Sarah Bartlett

- South East Stars won the toss and elected to field.
- Points: South East Stars 4, Sunrisers 0

18 May 2022
16:00 BST
Scorecard

Central Sparks; 170/6 (20 overs)	v	South East Stars; 136 (20 overs)
Issy Wong 45 (28); Alice Davidson-Richards 2/27 (4 overs)		Bryony Smith 41 (31); Grace Potts 4/36 (4 overs)

Central Sparks won by 34 runs
Woodbridge Road, Guildford
Umpires: Paul Baldwin and Sophie McLelland

- South East Stars won the toss and elected to field.
- Points: Central Sparks 5, South East Stars 0

18 May 2022
19:00 BST (D/N)
Scorecard

Sunrisers; 160/5 (20 overs)	v	Western Storm; 164/9 (20 overs)
Grace Scrivens 56 (42); Heather Knight 1/22 (4 overs)		Katie George 34 (23); Grace Scrivens 4/33 (4 overs)

Western Storm won by 1 wicket
County Ground, Chelmsford
Umpires: Chris Watts and Sue Redfern

- Western Storm won the toss and chose to field.
- Points: Western Storm 4, Sunrisers 0

21 May 2022
11:00 BST
Scorecard

Western Storm; 145/6 (20 overs)	v	South East Stars; 148/3 (19 overs)
Georgia Hennessy 50 (52); Bryony Smith 2/22 (3 overs)		Aylish Cranstone 66* (49); Claire Nicholas 2/17 (4 overs)

South East Stars won by 7 wickets
County Ground, Beckenham
Umpires: Ben Debenham and Sarah Bartlett

- South East Stars won the toss and elected to field.
- Points: South East Stars 4, Western Storm 0

21 May 2022
14:30 BST
Scorecard

Central Sparks; 153/5 (20 overs)	v	Sunrisers; 129/8 (20 overs)
Amy Jones 80 (49); Kelly Castle 2/19 (4 overs)		Naomi Dattani 51 (32); Sarah Glenn 2/14 (4 overs)

Central Sparks won by 24 runs
Edgbaston Cricket Ground, Birmingham
Umpires: Grace Bambury and Sue Redfern

- Sunrisers won the toss and elected to field.
- Points: Central Sparks 4, Sunrisers 0

29 May 2022
11:00 BST
Scorecard

Western Storm; 169/5 (20 overs)	v	Sunrisers; 128/6 (20 overs)
Sophie Luff 78 (54); Kelly Castle 2/16 (3 overs)		Naomi Dattani 53 (51); Danielle Gibson 2/13 (2 overs)

Western Storm won by 41 runs
County Ground, Taunton
Umpires: Alex Wharf and Sophie McLelland

- Western Storm won the toss and elected to bat.
- Points: Western Storm 5, Sunrisers 0

29 May 2022
18:15 BST (D/N)
Scorecard

South East Stars; 148/6 (20 overs)	v	Central Sparks; 91/7 (12 overs)
Aylish Cranstone 59* (53); Sarah Glenn 3/17 (4 overs)		Evelyn Jones 25 (23); Danielle Gregory 2/6 (2 overs)

South East Stars won by 10 runs (DLS)
Edgbaston Cricket Ground, Birmingham
Umpires: Ian Blackwell and Jane Pratt

- South East Stars won the toss and elected to bat.
- Central Sparks' target revised to 102 from 12 overs due to rain.
- Points: South East Stars 4, Central Sparks 0

1 June 2022
14:30 BST
Scorecard

Western Storm; 109/8 (20 overs)	v	South East Stars; 112/7 (19.3 overs)
Fran Wilson 33* (30); Kalea Moore 3/4 (2 overs)		Alice Davidson-Richards 35 (25); Sophia Smale 2/18 (4 overs)

South East Stars won by 3 wickets
County Ground, Bristol
Umpires: Anna Harris and Sarah Bartlett

- South East Stars won the toss and elected to field.
- Points: South East Stars 4, Western Storm 0

1 June 2022
14:30 BST
Scorecard

Central Sparks; 146/5 (20 overs)	v	Sunrisers; 143/6 (20 overs)
Evelyn Jones 69 (62); Naomi Dattani 2/39 (4 overs)		Jo Gardner 41 (30); Elizabeth Russell 2/24 (4 overs)

Central Sparks won by 3 runs
County Ground, Northampton
Umpires: Billy Taylor and Jasmine Naeem

- Central Sparks won the toss and elected to bat.
- Points: Central Sparks 4, Sunrisers 0

4 June 2022
14:30 BST
Scorecard

Central Sparks; 134/4 (20 overs)	v	Western Storm; 135/3 (18.5 overs)
Amy Jones 63 (46); Sophia Smale 2/17 (4 overs)		Georgia Hennessy 47* (45); Emily Arlott 2/29 (4 overs)

Western Storm won by 7 wickets
New Road, Worcester
Umpires: Jane Pratt and Naeem Ashraf

- Central Sparks won the toss and elected to bat.
- Points: Western Storm 4, Central Sparks 0

5 June 2022
14:30 BST
Scorecard

South East Stars; 183/9 (20 overs)	v	Sunrisers; 127 (17 overs)
Bryony Smith 50 (31); Kelly Castle 2/14 (4 overs)		Amara Carr 31 (27); Kalea Moore 2/16 (3 overs)

South East Stars won by 56 runs
Woodbridge Road, Guildford
Umpires: Anna Harris and Sue Redfern

- South East Stars won the toss and elected to bat.
- Points: South East Stars 5, Sunrisers 0

=== Group B ===
14 May 2022
14:30 BST
Scorecard

Northern Diamonds; 177/5 (20 overs)	v	Lightning; 138/7 (20 overs)
Lauren Winfield-Hill 96 (51); Kathryn Bryce 2/44 (4 overs)		Tammy Beaumont 59 (49); Emma Marlow 2/12 (4 overs)

Northern Diamonds won by 39 runs
Haslegrave Ground, Loughborough
Umpires: Grace Bambury and Sue Redfern

- Northern Diamonds won the toss and elected to bat.
- Points: Northern Diamonds 5, Lightning 0

14 May 2022
14:30 BST
Scorecard

North West Thunder; 102/7 (20 overs)	v	Southern Vipers; 103/2 (13.3 overs)
Emma Lamb 23 (23); Freya Kemp 2/13 (4 overs)		Maia Bouchier 48* (33); Emma Lamb 1/6 (2 overs)

Southern Vipers won by 8 wickets
County Ground, Hove
Umpires: Sophie McLelland and Surendiran Shanmugam

- North West Thunder won the toss and elected to bat.
- Points: Southern Vipers 5, North West Thunder 0

18 May 2022
13:30 BST
Scorecard

North West Thunder; 148/7 (20 overs)	v	Northern Diamonds; 92 (20 overs)
Georgie Boyce 65 (56); Katie Levick 4/22 (4 overs)		Bess Heath 19 (14); Hannah Jones 3/23 (4 overs)

North West Thunder won by 56 runs
Rookwood Cricket Ground, Sale
Umpires: Grace Bambury and Graham Lloyd

- North West Thunder won the toss and elected to bat.
- Points: North West Thunder 5, Northern Diamonds 0

18 May 2022
18:30 BST (D/N)
Scorecard

Southern Vipers; 155/5 (20 overs)	v	Lightning; 124/8 (20 overs)
Maia Bouchier 41 (34); Marie Kelly 2/17 (3 overs)		Kathryn Bryce 54 (51); Lauren Bell 3/12 (4 overs)

Southern Vipers won by 31 runs
Rose Bowl, Southampton
Umpires: Rob White and Sarah Bartlett

- Lightning won the toss and elected to field.
- Points: Southern Vipers 5, Lightning 0

21 May 2022
14:30 BST
Scorecard

Southern Vipers; 126 (19.3 overs)	v	Northern Diamonds; 115/7 (20 overs)
Danni Wyatt 48 (43); Katie Levick 5/15 (4 overs)		Bess Heath 51 (44); Georgia Adams 2/9 (3 overs)

Southern Vipers won by 11 runs
Riverside Ground, Chester-le-Street
Umpires: Joanne Ibbotson and Naeem Ashraf

- Southern Vipers won the toss and elected to bat.
- Points: Southern Vipers 4, Northern Diamonds 0

21 May 2022
14:30 BST
Scorecard

North West Thunder; 152/5 (20 overs)	v	Lightning; 155/5 (18.5 overs)
Georgie Boyce 71 (56); Piepa Cleary 3/34 (4 overs)		Tammy Beaumont 59 (38); Alex Hartley 1/13 (4 overs)

Lightning won by 5 wickets
Grace Road, Leicester
Umpires: Anna Harris and Rob White

- North West Thunder won the toss and elected to bat.
- Points: Lightning 4, North West Thunder 0

29 May 2022
11:00 BST
Scorecard

Northern Diamonds; 124 (20 overs)	v	North West Thunder; 99 (19 overs)
Sterre Kalis 28 (30); Hannah Jones 3/23 (4 overs)		Danielle Collins 26 (33); Katie Levick 3/25 (4 overs)

Northern Diamonds won by 25 runs
Headingley Cricket Ground, Headingley
Umpires: Anna Harris and David Millns

- Northern Diamonds won the toss and elected to bat.
- Points: Northern Diamonds 5, North West Thunder 0

29 May 2022
11:00 BST
Scorecard

Lightning; 141 (19.4 overs)	v	Southern Vipers; 142/5 (16.4 overs)
Marie Kelly 36 (12); Georgia Elwiss 3/28 (4 overs)		Danni Wyatt 76 (44); Lucy Higham 3/30 (3 overs)

Southern Vipers won by 5 wickets
Trent Bridge, Nottingham
Umpires: Jasmine Naeem and Russell Warren

- Lightning won the toss and elected to bat.
- Points: Southern Vipers 4, Lightning 0

1 June 2022
14:15 BST
Scorecard

Northern Diamonds; 145/5 (20 overs)	v	Lightning; 140 (19.5 overs)
Bess Heath 60 (46); Piepa Cleary 2/24 (4 overs)		Ella Claridge 41 (36); Hollie Armitage 4/27 (4 overs)

Northern Diamonds won by 5 runs
Riverside Ground, Chester-le-Street
Umpires: Jane Pratt and Neil Pratt

- Northern Diamonds won the toss and elected to bat.
- Points: Northern Diamonds 4, Lightning 0

1 June 2022
19:00 BST (D/N)
Scorecard

North West Thunder; 94/6 (20 overs)	v	Southern Vipers; 97/4 (15.3 overs)
Sophie Ecclestone 28* (32); Charlie Dean 3/16 (4 overs)		Georgia Elwiss 38* (35); Hannah Jones 1/10 (2 overs)

Southern Vipers won by 6 wickets
Old Trafford Cricket Ground, Manchester
Umpires: Joanne Ibbotson and Tim Robinson

- North West Thunder won the toss and elected to bat.
- Points: Southern Vipers 5, North West Thunder 0

3 June 2022
14:30 BST
Scorecard

Lightning; 103 (18 overs)	v	North West Thunder; 104/5 (15.2 overs)
Marie Kelly 21 (8); Sophie Ecclestone 5/15 (4 overs)		Emma Lamb 42 (35); Kathryn Bryce 2/24 (4 overs)

North West Thunder won by 5 wickets
Old Trafford Cricket Ground, Manchester
Umpires: Jasmine Naeem and Neil Pratt

- Lightning won the toss and elected to bat.
- Points: North West Thunder 5, Lightning 0

4 June 2022
14:30 BST
Scorecard

Northern Diamonds; 141/4 (20 overs)	v	Southern Vipers; 144/4 (18.2 overs)
Nat Sciver 50 (37); Charlie Dean 2/24 (4 overs)		Georgia Adams 47 (41); Leigh Kasperek 2/16 (2 overs)

Southern Vipers won by 6 wickets
Rose Bowl, Southampton
Umpires: Nigel Llong and Sarah Bartlett

- Northern Diamonds won the toss and elected to bat.
- Points: Southern Vipers 4, Northern Diamonds 0

=== Finals Day ===
Semi-Final			Final
			B1	Southern Vipers	110/4
A1	South East Stars	104/8	A2	Central Sparks	109/8
A2	Central Sparks	105/8

==== Semi-final ====
11 June 2022
12:00 BST
Scorecard

South East Stars; 104/8 (20 overs)	v	Central Sparks; 105/8 (19.1 overs)
Kalea Moore 34 (42); Grace Potts 3/20 (4 overs)		Evelyn Jones 29 (24); Bryony Smith 4/14 (4 overs)

Central Sparks won by 2 wickets
County Ground, Northampton
Umpires: Sarah Bartlett and Sophie McLelland
Player of the match: Issy Wong (Central Sparks)

- South East Stars won the toss and elected to bat.

==== Final ====
11 June 2022
16:00 BST
Scorecard

Central Sparks; 109/8 (20 overs)	v	Southern Vipers; 110/4 (15.5 overs)
Amy Jones 27 (23); Charlie Dean 2/19 (4 overs)		Maia Bouchier 32 (25); Emily Arlott 2/28 (4 overs)

Southern Vipers won by 6 wickets
County Ground, Northampton
Umpires: Anna Harris and Sue Redfern
Player of the match: Charlie Dean (Southern Vipers)

- Central Sparks won the toss and elected to bat.

== Statistics ==
- Highest score by a team: South East Stars – 183/9 (20 overs) v Sunrisers (5 June).
- Top score by an individual: Lauren Winfield-Hill – 96 (51) v Lightning (14 May).
- Best bowling figures by an individual: Katie Levick – 5/15 (4 overs) v Southern Vipers (21 May) and Sophie Ecclestone – 5/15 (4 overs) v Lightning (3 June).

=== Most runs ===
Player	Team	Matches	Innings	Runs	Average	HS	100s	50s
Amy Jones	Central Sparks	8	8	289	36.12	80	0	3
Aylish Cranstone	South East Stars	7	7	235	58.75	66*	0	3
Danni Wyatt	Southern Vipers	6	6	221	36.83	76	0	1
Evelyn Jones	Central Sparks	8	8	213	26.62	69	0	1
Emma Lamb	North West Thunder	6	6	191	31.83	56	0	2

Source: ESPNCricinfo

=== Most wickets ===
Player	Team	Overs	Wickets	Average	BBI	5w
Katie Levick	Northern Diamonds	20.0	15	9.06	5/15	1
Charlie Dean	Southern Vipers	20.0	12	8.25	3/16	0
Grace Potts	Central Sparks	26.0	12	16.83	4/36	0
Bryony Smith	South East Stars	23.0	11	13.27	4/14	0
Sarah Glenn	Central Sparks	32.0	10	16.60	3/17	0

Source: ESPNCricinfo
