= Joy Liebert =

English cricketer

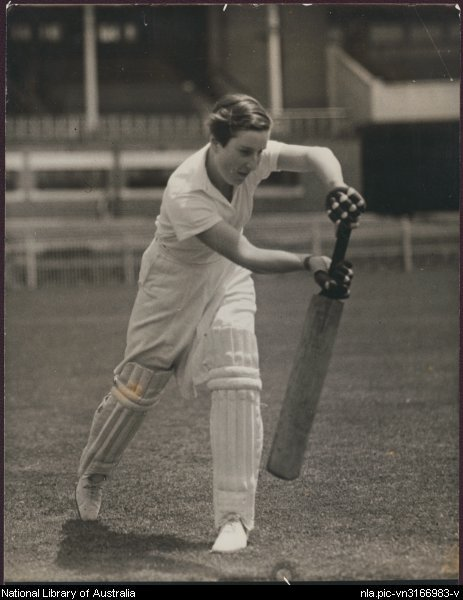

Personal information
- Full name: Joyce Liebert
- Born: 16 May 1914; Fylde, Lancashire, England
- Died: 8 June 1999 (aged 85); Dorset, England
- Role: All-rounder

International information
- National side: England (1934–1935)
- Test debut (cap 4): 26 December 1934 v Australia
- Last Test: 18 February 1935 v New Zealand

Domestic team information
- Years: Team
- 1937: Lancashire

Career statistics
Competition	WTest	WFC
Matches	4	9
Runs scored	14	67
Batting average	4.66	7.44
100s/50s	0/0	0/0
Top score	13	16
Balls bowled	–	52
Wickets	–	1
Bowling average	–	35.00
5 wickets in innings	–	0
10 wickets in match	–	0
Best bowling	–	1/7
Catches/stumpings	2/–	2/–
- Source: CricketArchive, 12 March 2021

Joyce Liebert, married name Joyce Lawrence, (16 May 1914 – 8 June 1999) was an English cricketer who played as an all-rounder. She appeared in 4 Test matches for England in 1934 and 1935. These were the first four women's tests, and she was the youngest member of England's touring party. She played domestic cricket for various composite and regional teams, such as North Women, as well as appearing for Lancashire.
