= Paul Shaw (cricketer) =

English cricketer

Personal information
- Full name: Paul Frank Shaw
- Born: 28 July 1967 (age 59); Burton upon Trent, Staffordshire, England
- Batting: Left-handed
- Bowling: Right-arm medium
- Role: Batter

Domestic team information
- Years: Team
- 1992–2004: Staffordshire

Head coaching information
- Years: Team
- 2020–2023: North West Thunder
- 2021–2022: Manchester Originals
- 2021: Lancashire Women

Career statistics
Competition	LA
Matches	12
Runs scored	310
Batting average	28.18
100s/50s	0/2
Top score	62
Catches/stumpings	3/–
- Source: Cricinfo, 15 June 2011

Paul Frank Shaw (born 28 July 1967) is a former English cricketer. Shaw was a left-handed batsman who bowled right-arm medium pace. He was born in Burton upon Trent, Staffordshire.

Shaw made his debut for Staffordshire in the 1992 Minor Counties Championship against Northumberland. Shaw played Minor counties cricket for Staffordshire from 1992 to 2004, which included 64 Minor Counties Championship matches and 21 MCCA Knockout Trophy matches. In 1993, he made his List A debut against Hampshire in the NatWest Trophy. He made 11 further appearances in List A cricket, the last coming against Lancashire in the 2004 Cheltenham & Gloucester Trophy. In his 12 List A matches, he scored 310 runs at an average of 28.18, scoring 2 half centuries and making his highest score of 62 against Hertfordshire in the 2002 Cheltenham & Gloucester Trophy.

In 2020, Shaw was appointed as Head Coach of the new women's side North West Thunder, having previously worked in various roles at the ECB, including England Women's Academy Head Coach and Head of Performance. He was appointed as Head Coach of Manchester Originals' women's side for the inaugural season of The Hundred in 2021, as well simultaneously becoming Head Coach of Lancashire Women.
