= Ellie Threlkeld =

English cricketer

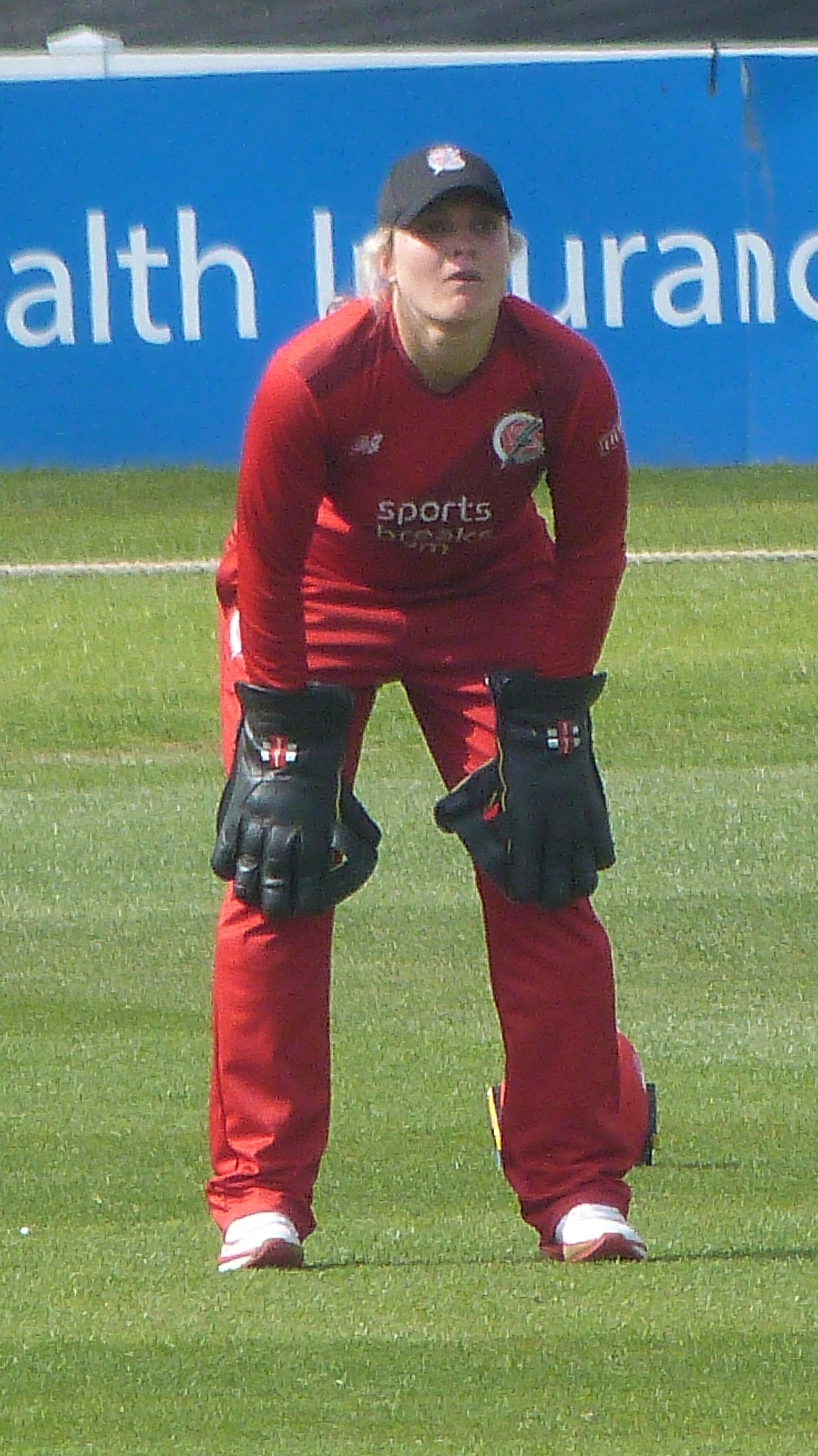
- Threlkeld keeping-wicket for North West Thunder in May 2023

Personal information
- Full name: Eleanor Threlkeld
- Born: 16 November 1998 (age 27); Knowsley, Merseyside, England
- Batting: Right-handed
- Role: Wicket-keeper

Domestic team information
- Years: Team
- 2013–present: Lancashire
- 2016–2019: Lancashire Thunder
- 2020–2024: North West Thunder
- 2021–present: Manchester Originals

Career statistics
Competition	WLA	WT20
Matches	85	140
Runs scored	1,534	1,259
Batting average	21.91	14.98
100s/50s	1/7	0/4
Top score	107*	56*
Catches/stumpings	47/34	41/77
- Source: CricketArchive, 17 October 2024

Eleanor Threlkeld (born 16 November 1998) is an English cricketer who currently plays for Lancashire and Manchester Originals. She plays as a wicket-keeper and right-handed batter. She previously played for Lancashire Thunder and North West Thunder.

== Early life ==
Threlkeld was born on 16 November 1998 in Knowsley, Merseyside. She attends Loughborough University.

== Domestic career ==
Threlkeld made her county debut in 2013, for Lancashire against Warwickshire. She scored 3*, as well as keeping wicket. She became a regular for the side from 2014, but did not score her first half-century for the club until 2019, scoring 72 in a victory over Nottinghamshire in the County Championship. She also achieved her Twenty20 high score that season, hitting 56* against Sussex. Threlkeld was part of the Lancashire team that won the County Championship and Twenty20 Cup double in 2017. She played four matches for the side in the 2021 Women's Twenty20 Cup, scoring 101 runs including one half-century, 52 against Cumbria. She captained Lancashire in the 2022 Women's Twenty20 Cup, as well as scoring 63 runs at an average of 21.00. She played two matches for the side in the 2023 Women's Twenty20 Cup.

Threlkeld was also part of Lancashire Thunder's squad in the Women's Cricket Super League from 2016 to 2019. She appeared in all 30 of the side's matches. She hit two half-centuries in her time there, 53* against Yorkshire Diamonds in 2018 (a match in which she also made four stumpings) and 52 against the same opponents in 2019.

In 2020, Threlkeld played for North West Thunder in the Rachael Heyhoe Flint Trophy. She appeared in all 6 matches, scoring 114 runs at an average of 19.00, with a best of 52 in a victory over Lightning. In December 2020, it was announced that Threlkeld was one of the 41 female cricketers that had signed a full-time domestic contract. She was ever-present for the side in 2021, with a top-score of 70* in Thunder's victory over South East Stars. She had the joint-most dismissals in the Rachael Heyhoe Flint Trophy, with 10 dismissals. She was also ever-present for Manchester Originals in The Hundred, scoring 29 runs and making 7 dismissals.

Ahead of the 2022 season, Threlkeld was appointed as captain of North West Thunder, replacing Alex Hartley. She was the side's leading run-scorer in the 2022 Rachael Heyhoe Flint Trophy, with 266 runs at an average of 53.20. She made two half-centuries in the competition, 91 against Lightning and 79 against Southern Vipers. She was also ever-present for Manchester Originals in The Hundred, scoring 32 runs. She played 19 matches for the side in 2023, and was the side's leading-run scorer in the Rachael Heyhoe Flint Trophy, including scoring her maiden List A century, with 107* against Western Storm. She also played six matches for Manchester Originals in The Hundred, making six dismissals. In 2024, she played 22 matches for North West Thunder, across the Rachael Heyhoe Flint Trophy and the Charlotte Edwards Cup, scoring one half-century and making 13 dismissals.

Threlkeld has also appeared for various England Academy and Development teams, and toured South Africa with the England Academy in 2018.

== International career ==
In December 2021, Threlkeld was named in England's A squad for their tour to Australia, with the matches being played alongside the Women's Ashes. She played all six matches on the tour, taking three catches and making two stumpings.
