= Georgie Boyce =

English cricketer (born 1998)

Personal information
- Full name: Georgie Eva Burton Boyce
- Born: 4 October 1998 (age 28); Nottingham, Nottinghamshire, England
- Batting: Right-handed
- Bowling: Right-arm medium
- Role: Batter

Domestic team information
- Years: Team
- 2013–2018: Nottinghamshire
- 2016–2017: Loughborough Lightning
- 2018–2019: Lancashire Thunder
- 2019–2022: Lancashire
- 2020–2022: North West Thunder
- 2021–2022: Manchester Originals
- 2022–2026: The Blaze
- 2023: Northern Superchargers
- 2024: Oval Invincibles
- 2025: Birmingham Phoenix

Career statistics
Competition	WLA	WT20
Matches	69	94
Runs scored	1,544	1,918
Batting average	23.75	24.27
100s/50s	1/8	0/13
Top score	104	96*
Balls bowled	444	234
Wickets	6	8
Bowling average	51.33	29.50
5 wickets in innings	0	0
10 wickets in match	0	0
Best bowling	2/20	2/3
Catches/stumpings	15/–	15/–
- Source: CricketArchive, 19 October 2024

Georgie Eva Burton Boyce (born 4 October 1998) is an English former cricketer. A right-handed batter, she played for a number of clubs including Nottinghamshire, Lancashire, Lancashire Thunder, North West Thunder, The Blaze and Manchester Originals.

== Early life ==
Boyce was born on 4 October 1998 in Nottingham.

== Domestic career ==
Boyce made her county debut in 2013, for Nottinghamshire against Staffordshire. She did not bat or bowl. She played three matches that season before becoming more of a regular in the next, and she hit her maiden half-century in 2014, scoring 50* in a successful chase against Yorkshire.

In 2016, Nottinghamshire were promoted from Division 2 of the County Championship, with Boyce ending the season as the sides third-highest run-scorer. She was also the team's leading run-scorer in the Twenty20 Cup. Boyce was again her side's leading run-scorer in the 2018 Women's Twenty20 Cup, with a best of 74 coming in a victory over Worcestershire.

In 2019, Boyce joined Lancashire. She was their leading run-scorer in the County Championship, scoring 262 runs at an average of 43.66, which was also the highest of any non-international player across the whole competition. She also achieved what was at the time her highest List A score in the competition, hitting 83 in a 1-run victory over Surrey. In 2021, she hit 179 runs as her side won the North Group of the Twenty20 Cup, including 96* from 73 balls in a match against North East Warriors. In 2022, she was the leading run-scorer across the entire Twenty20 Cup, with 306 runs including three half-centuries. At the end of the 2022 season, it was announced that Boyce had left Lancashire.

Boyce was part of Loughborough Lightning's squad in the Women's Cricket Super League in 2016 and 2017, but did not play a match for them. She joined Lancashire Thunder in 2018, and played 9 games for them that season, scoring 98 runs at an average of 12.25. She played 7 matches for them in 2019, and scored her WCSL high score of 43 opening the batting against Southern Vipers.

In 2020, Boyce played for North West Thunder in the Rachael Heyhoe Flint Trophy. She appeared in all 6 matches, scoring 105 runs at an average of 17.50. In December 2020, it was announced that Boyce was one of the 41 female cricketers that had signed a full-time domestic contract. In 2021, she was Thunder's second-highest run-scorer in the Rachael Heyhoe Flint Trophy, with 232 runs including scoring 91 against Sunrisers and 67 against Northern Diamonds. She also scored 87 runs in 6 matches in the Charlotte Edwards Cup. Boyce played for Manchester Originals in The Hundred, appearing in 5 matches and scoring 37 runs. In 2022, she scored 172 runs for North West Thunder in the Charlotte Edwards Cup, including two half-centuries. She also played four matches for the side in the Rachael Heyhoe Flint Trophy, before, in September, joining Lightning, citing moving closer to home as a big reason for the move. She played two matches for her new side, and scored 70 in Lightning's final match of the tournament, against South East Stars. She was also again in the Manchester Originals squad for The Hundred, but did not play a match. In November 2022, it was confirmed that Boyce had signed a professional contract with Lightning, now known as The Blaze.

In 2023, she played 22 matches for The Blaze, across the Rachael Heyhoe Flint Trophy and the Charlotte Edwards Cup, and was the side's leading run-scorer in the Charlotte Edwards Cup, with 200 runs at an average of 28.57. She also scored her maiden List A century in the Rachael Heyhoe Flint Trophy, with 104 against Sunrisers. She was signed by Northern Superchargers for The Hundred, but did not play a match. In 2024, she played one match for The Blaze.

Boyce has also played for various England Academy and Development teams, having been part of the national set-up since 2014.

She announced her retirement from professional cricket on 6 October 2026.
