= Emma Lamb =

English cricketer (born 1997)

Personal information
- Full name: Emma Louise Lamb
- Born: 16 December 1997 (age 28); Preston, Lancashire, England
- Batting: Right-handed
- Bowling: Right-arm off break
- Role: Batting all-rounder
- Relatives: Danny Lamb (brother)

International information
- National side: England
- Test debut (cap 165): 27 June 2022 v South Africa
- Last Test: 22 June 2023 v Australia
- ODI debut (cap 137): 8 February 2022 v Australia
- Last ODI: 22 October 2025 v Australia
- ODI shirt no.: 6
- Only T20I (cap 51): 1 September 2021 v New Zealand
- T20I shirt no.: 6

Domestic team information
- Years: Team
- 2012–present: Lancashire Women
- 2016–2019: Lancashire Thunder
- 2020–2024: North West Thunder
- 2021–2024: Manchester Originals
- 2025–present: Birmingham Phoenix

Career statistics
| Competition | WTest | WODI | WT20I | WLA |
|---|---|---|---|---|
| Matches | 2 | 26 | 1 | 126 |
| Runs scored | 76 | 596 | 0 | 4,154 |
| Batting average | 25.33 | 27.09 | – | 37.76 |
| 100s/50s | 0/0 | 1/4 | 0/0 | 6/28 |
| Top score | 38 | 102 | 0* | 142 |
| Balls bowled | 12 | 126 | – | 1,815 |
| Wickets | 0 | 3 | – | 54 |
| Bowling average | – | 38.66 | – | 25.77 |
| 5 wickets in innings | 0 | 0 | – | 0 |
| 10 wickets in match | 0 | 0 | – | 0 |
| Best bowling | – | 3/42 | – | 4/39 |
| Catches/stumpings | 2/– | 3/– | 0/– | 24/– |
- Source: CricketArchive, 30 October 2025

Emma Louise Lamb (born 16 December 1997) is an English cricketer who plays for Lancashire Women and Birmingham Phoenix, and has previously played for Lancashire Thunder, North West Thunder and Manchester Originals. Lamb is a batting all-rounder, and bowls off spin. She made her international debut for the England women's cricket team in September 2021.

== Personal life ==
Lamb is from Preston, Lancashire, England. She studied at Edge Hill University, graduating in 2019. Her brother Danny plays for the Sussex men's team, and she played alongside him when she became the second female cricketer to take part in the Cheshire County Premier League after Jenny Halstead, who played for Poynton in 2005.

== Club career ==
Lamb played at youth level for Lancashire Women, and was their player of the year on two occasions. She averaged over 100 in under-17 level cricket. In 2015, Lamb became the second woman to play in the Cheshire County Cricket League, when she played for Bramhall against Neston. She scored 30 runs in the match. Her brother Danny also played in the match. Lamb has also played for the Lancashire men's academy. she was the second woman to have done so (the first being Kate Cross).

Lamb made her Women's County Championship debut in 2012, playing for Lancashire Women against Warwickshire Women. In 2013, she made her first century in a match against Durham Women. Aged 18, Lamb opened the batting for Lancashire Thunder in the 2016 Women's Cricket Super League. She made the most runs of any English woman in the tournament, and was the only English woman in the top 10 run scorers. Lamb was part of the Lancashire Women team that won two trophies: the 2017 Women's County Championship, and the 2017 Women's Twenty20 Cup. In 2018, Lamb took 4/17 in a Super League match against Southern Vipers. It was the best bowling figures by a Thunder bowler in the Super League. Between 2016 and 2019, Lamb made 30 appearances for Thunder in the Super League, scoring 329 runs and taking 21 wickets. In 2020, Lamb played for North West Thunder in the Rachael Heyhoe Flint Trophy. In December 2020, Lamb was one of 41 women's cricketers given a full-time domestic cricket contract. Lamb was selected to play for Manchester Originals in The Hundred; the 2020 season was cancelled due to the COVID-19 pandemic, and Lamb was retained by the Originals for the 2021 season. She was the second leading run scorer of Manchester Originals with 135 runs in the tournament.

In 2021, Lamb became the first batter to score a century in the Charlotte Edwards Cup, scoring 111* off 61 balls against Sunrisers. She ended the tournament as the second highest run-scorer across all teams. She was also North West Thunder's leading run-scorer in the Rachael Heyhoe Flint Trophy, with 237 runs including her List A high score of 121.

In April 2022, she was bought by the Manchester Originals for the 2022 season of The Hundred. Ahead of the 2025 The Hundred season, Lamb signed for Birmingham Phoenix.

Lamb was named 2025 Professional Cricketers' Association Women's Player of the Year.

== International career ==
In 2016, Lamb was called up to the England women's cricket team for their tour of Sri Lanka. She played for the England women's academy in matches against Sri Lanka A and Australia Shooting Stars. In 2017, Lamb played for England in a pre-season tour match against Ireland. The match was a warm up match prior to the 2017 Women's Cricket World Cup.

In February 2020, Lamb attended a Professional Cricketers' Association rookie training camp. In April 2020, Lamb was awarded an England rookie contract. In June 2020, Lamb was one of 25 women given a retainer contract. The retainer was in addition to her rookie contract. In the same month, she was one of 24 England women given permission to start training ahead of possible international matches. It was the first time that woman cricketers had been allowed to train since English cricket was suspended due to the COVID-19 pandemic. Lamb was one of three uncapped players in the training squad; the others were Lauren Bell and Issy Wong.

In August 2021, Lamb was added to England's Women's Twenty20 International (WT20I) squad for their series against New Zealand, after Maia Bouchier and Charlie Dean were both ruled out of the first match after being identified as possible COVID-19 contacts. She made her WT20I England debut in the first match of the series.

In December 2021, Lamb was named in England's A squad for their tour to Australia, with the matches being played alongside the Women's Ashes. Lamb was added to England's Ashes squad for the final Women's One Day International (WODI) match of the tour, where she made her WODI debut. In February 2022, she was named in England's team for the 2022 Women's Cricket World Cup in New Zealand. In June 2022, Lamb was named in England's Women's Test squad for their one-off match against South Africa. She made her Test debut on 27 June 2022, for England against South Africa. The following month, also in the series against South Africa, Lamb scored her first century in WODI cricket, with 102 runs. In November 2022, Lamb was awarded with her first England central contract.
