= Rookwood Cricket Ground, Sale =

Cricket ground

Rookwood Cricket Ground
Ground information
- Location: Sale, Greater Manchester
- Coordinates: 53.427448°N 2.305800°W
- Home club: Sale Cricket Club
- Establishment: 1882 (first recorded match)

Team information
North West Thunder	(2021–present)
- As of 10 September 2021; Source: CricketArchive

Rookwood Cricket Ground is a cricket ground in Sale, Greater Manchester that is the home of Sale Cricket Club. The club was founded in 1854, and the first recorded match was played on the ground in 1882.

In 2021, it was announced that Sale Cricket Club and Lancashire County Cricket Club had formed a three-year agreement, with the Lancashire Academy and Age Group squads using the ground to train. The partnership also included North West Thunder, the women's regional team for the North West, with the side playing the first List A match at the ground on 10 September 2021, against Southern Vipers in the Rachael Heyhoe Flint Trophy.

Lancashire had previously played two Second XI Twenty20s on the ground in 2016, and Cheshire County Cricket Club have used the ground for Age Group matches (with the ground being located in the historic county of Cheshire).
