= Kate Cross =

English cricketer

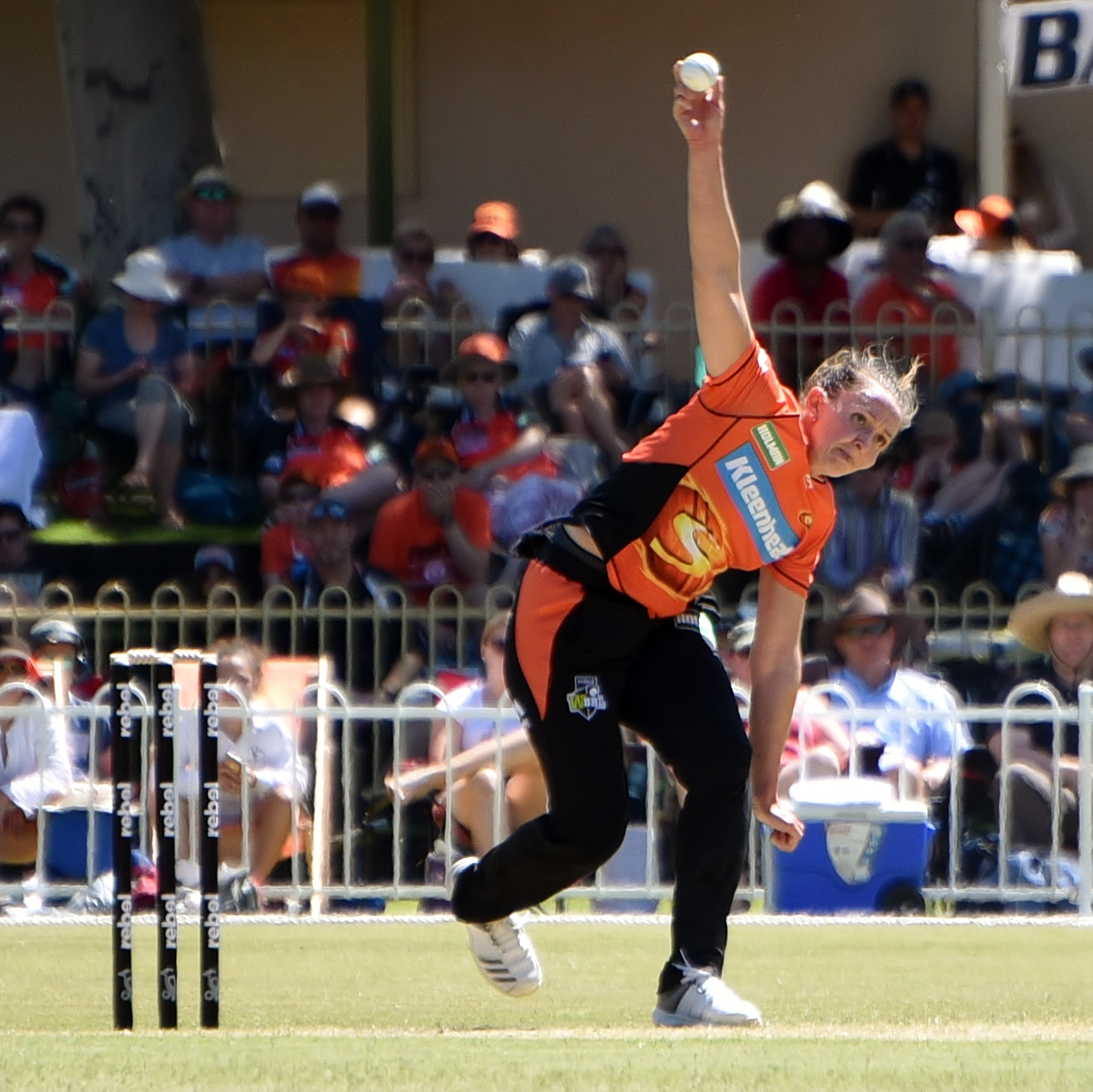

Personal information
- Full name: Kathryn Laura Cross
- Born: 3 October 1991 (age 35); Manchester, England
- Nickname: Crossy
- Batting: Right-handed
- Bowling: Right-arm medium-fast
- Role: Bowler

International information
- National side: England (2013–2025)
- Test debut (cap 152): 10 January 2014 v Australia
- Last Test: 14 December 2023 v India
- ODI debut (cap 124): 29 October 2013 v West Indies
- Last ODI: 16 July 2025 v India
- ODI shirt no.: 16
- T20I debut (cap 36): 24 October 2013 v West Indies
- Last T20I: 15 September 2024 v Ireland

Domestic team information
- Years: Team
- 2005–present: Lancashire
- 2015/16: Brisbane Heat
- 2016–2019: Lancashire Thunder
- 2017/18–2018/19: Western Australia
- 2018/19: Perth Scorchers
- 2020–2024: North West Thunder
- 2021–2022: Manchester Originals
- 2022: Velocity
- 2023–2026: Northern Superchargers
- 2024: Royal Challengers Bangalore

Career statistics
Competition	WTest	WODI	WT20I
Matches	8	76	18
Runs scored	58	271	3
Batting average	6.44	12.31	3.00
100s/50s	0/0	0/0	0/0
Top score	16	38*	2
Balls bowled	1,464	3,380	350
Wickets	25	101	14
Bowling average	30.72	24.83	30.50
5 wickets in innings	0	3	0
10 wickets in match	0	0	0
Best bowling	4/63	6/30	2/18
Catches/stumpings	2/–	18/–	4/–
- Source: Cricinfo, 26 August 2025

Kathryn Laura Cross (born 3 October 1991) is an English international cricketer. She also co-hosts a podcast with Alex Hartley named "No Balls: The Cricket Podcast".

== Career ==
Cross has played domestic cricket for a number of teams including Lancashire, North West Thunder, Northern Superchargers and Royal Challengers Bangalore.

A right-arm medium fast bowler and right-handed batter, she was the first woman to be accepted into Lancashire's cricket academy in 2006 and won the Eversheds Most Promising Young Cricketer award in September 2007. She made her debut for the England Under-21 side in 2007. In October 2013 she was called up into the England senior squad to tour the West Indies. She made her T20 debut against the West Indies and in November 2013 made her One Day International debut, also against the West Indies. In her second game of the series (the first was washed out) she took 4 for 51 against the West Indies, a performance which earned her the Player of the Match Award. England won the final two games of a three match series and became the first team to win a series against the West Indies in the Caribbean.

In January 2010 she was called up to join the 2010/11 England Women tour of Australia after injuries to Beth Morgan and Claire Taylor.

In January 2014, she was selected for the Women's Ashes Tour of Australia, during which she played in 6 matches of the 7 match series. In her debut Test Match at the WACA in Perth, Cross had match figures of 32 overs, 6 wickets for 70 runs in a game that England won by 61 runs; having taken 3 for 35 in both Australian innings. England went on to win the series and retain the Ashes by a margin of 10 points to 8.

In April 2014, she was one of the 18 women to be awarded the first professional contracts by the ECB. In April 2015, she became the first woman to play in the Central Lancashire League, taking 3–19 in a game for Heywood, playing Clifton. Later in the season, again playing for Heywood, she took 8–47 against Unsworth.

In July 2015, she was signed by the Brisbane Heat for the inaugural Women's Big Bash as one of their two overseas players.

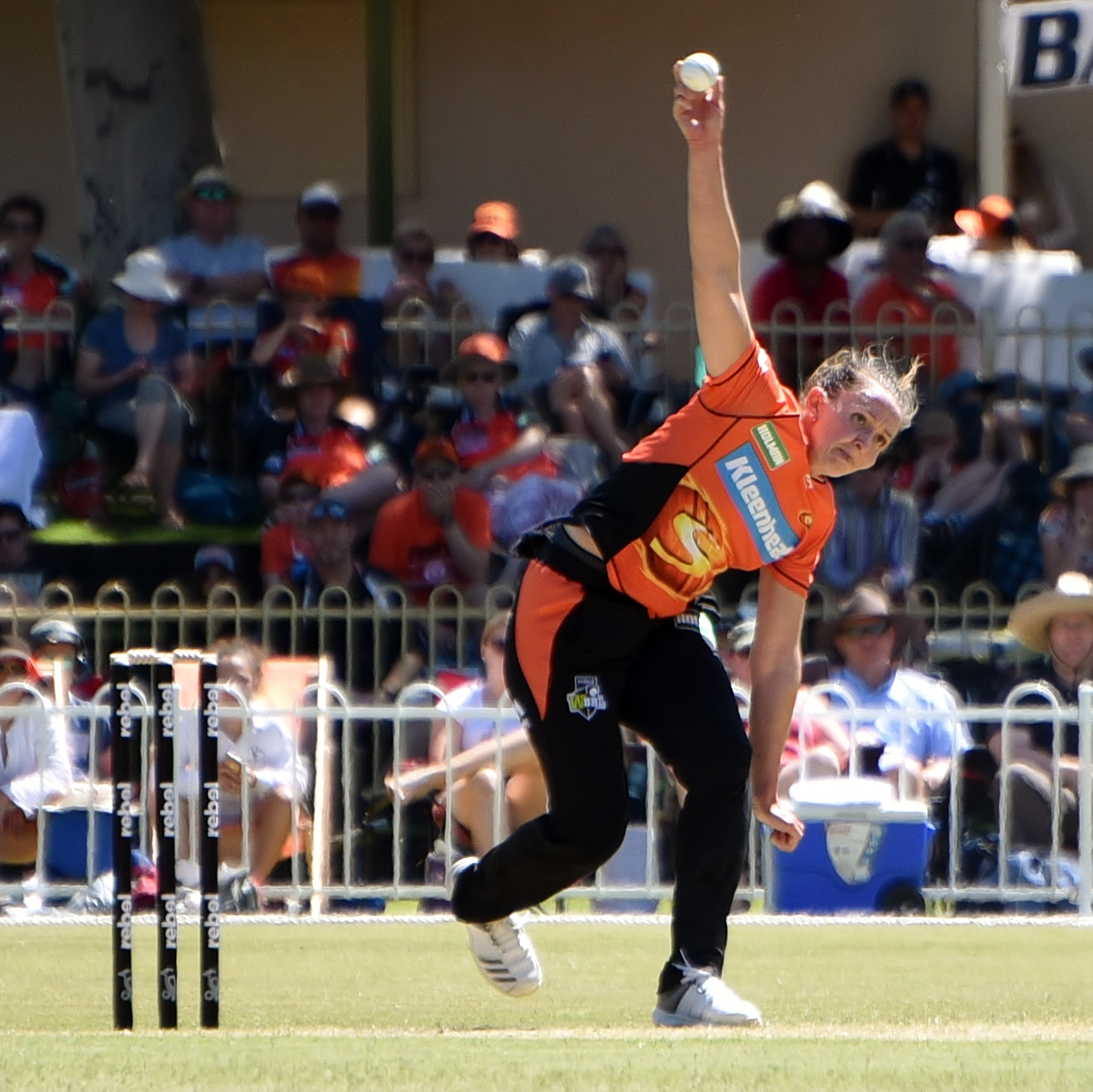
Kate Cross bowling for Perth Scorchers in 2018

In November 2018, she was named in the Perth Scorchers' squad for the 2018–19 Women's Big Bash League season.

In February 2019, she was awarded a full central contract by the England and Wales Cricket Board (ECB) for 2019. In June 2019, the ECB named her in England's squad for their opening match against Australia to contest the Women's Ashes. In January 2020, she was named in England's squad for the 2020 ICC Women's T20 World Cup in Australia.

On 18 June 2020, Cross was named in a squad of 24 players to begin training ahead of international women's fixtures starting in England following the COVID-19 pandemic in the United Kingdom.

In December 2020, Cross was announced as one of the commentators to feature on Talksport's commentary for England men's 2nd ODI against South Africa. The series was abandoned before the match could take place due to a COVID-19 outbreak.

In January 2021, Cross was announced as part of the squad who travelled to New Zealand for 3 ODIs and 3 T20Is. In June 2021, Cross was named as in England's Test squad for their one-off match against India.

In July 2021, Cross made her debut for the Manchester Originals as captain of the Hundred team. During the loss, she made history by hitting the first 6 in hundred ball cricket. She was the leading wicket taker for Manchester Originals with 12 wickets.

In December 2021, Cross was named in England's squad for their tour to Australia to contest the Women's Ashes. In February 2022, she was named in England's team for the 2022 Women's Cricket World Cup in New Zealand.

In February 2022, Cross was awarded the ESPNcricinfo Women's Bowling Performance Award for 2021, for her 5/34 taken against India. In April 2022, she was bought by the Manchester Originals for the 2022 season of The Hundred. In July 2022, she was named in England's team for the cricket tournament at the 2022 Commonwealth Games in Birmingham, England.

Cross captained England for the first time in an ODI against Ireland at Stormont in Belfast on 7 September 2024, marking the occasion by taking career best bowling figures of 6/30 and scoring 38 not out with the bat to lead her team to a four-wicket victory in the first contest of a three-match series.

She was named in England's squad for their multi-format tour to South Africa in November 2024.

Cross was named in the England squad for the 2025 Women's Ashes series in Australia.

In August 2026, Cross announced she would retire from all professional cricket at the conclusion of the summer.

== Personal life ==
Cross's father David was a professional footballer between 1969 and 1987, most notably for West Ham United, where he won the FA Cup in 1980. Her mother, Christine is a lawyer who specialises in matrimonial law. Her brother, Robert, played cricket for the Lancashire second XI and is a lawyer. He was also general manager of Lancashire Thunder and Chairman of the Lancashire County Cricket Club Federation. Her sister Jenny also worked for Lancashire Thunder as a physiotherapist.

Cross achieved a 2.1 in her degree in psychology from Leeds University in 2013. She graduated from Manchester Metropolitan University in 2023 with a master's degree in sports directorship. Her nickname is "Crossy".
