= Alex Hartley (cricketer) =

English cricketer (born 1993)

Personal information
- Full name: Alexandra Hartley
- Born: 6 September 1993 (age 33); Blackburn, Lancashire, England
- Batting: Right-handed
- Bowling: Slow left-arm orthodox
- Role: Bowler

International information
- National side: England (2016–2019)
- ODI debut (cap 127): 27 June 2016 v Pakistan
- Last ODI: 21 March 2019 v Sri Lanka
- ODI shirt no.: 65
- T20I debut (cap 41): 7 July 2016 v Pakistan
- Last T20I: 4 March 2019 v India

Domestic team information
- Years: Team
- 2008–2012: Lancashire
- 2013–2016: Middlesex
- 2016–2017: Surrey Stars
- 2017–2023: Lancashire
- 2018–2019: Lancashire Thunder
- 2018/19: Tasmania
- 2018/19: Hobart Hurricanes
- 2020–2023: North West Thunder
- 2021: Manchester Originals
- 2022–2023: Welsh Fire

Career statistics
Competition	WODI	WT20I	WLA	WT20
Matches	28	4	135	132
Runs scored	10	2	220	71
Batting average	10.00	–	5.36	5.07
100s/50s	0/0	0/0	0/0	0/0
Top score	3*	2*	26	15
Balls bowled	1,390	70	7,031	2,666
Wickets	39	3	182	126
Bowling average	24.30	26.33	22.05	21.63
5 wickets in innings	0	0	2	0
10 wickets in match	0	0	0	0
Best bowling	4/24	2/19	6/23	4/5
Catches/stumpings	4/–	0/–	26/–	17/–
- Source: CricketArchive, 26 August 2023

Alexandra Hartley (born 6 September 1993) is an English former cricketer who played as a left-arm orthodox spin bowler. Between 2016 and 2019, she appeared in 28 One Day Internationals and four Twenty20 Internationals for England. She was part of the side that won the 2017 World Cup. Hartley played domestic cricket for Lancashire, Middlesex, Surrey Stars, Lancashire Thunder, North West Thunder, Manchester Originals and Welsh Fire in England, as well as Tasmania and Hobart Hurricanes in Australia.

== Early life ==
Hartley was born on 6 September 1993 in Blackburn, Lancashire. She attended Ribblesdale High School in Clitheroe, Ribble Valley.

== Domestic career ==
Hartley made her county debut in 2008, at the age of 14, for Lancashire against Somerset, taking 1/26 from 10 overs in a 4-run victory. The following season, she was Lancashire's joint-leading wicket-taker in the County Championship, with 9 wickets at an average of 24.33. Her performances led to her being selected for the England Under-17s side that played in the Women's Development Tournament in South Africa in April 2010.

Hartley was a consistent performer for Lancashire over subsequent seasons: in the 2010 Women's County Championship, she took 19 wickets at an average of 12.47, including her List A best bowling figures of 6/23, against Scotland. She was also Lancashire's leading wicket-taker in the 2010 Women's Twenty20 Cup and the side's joint-leading wicket-taker in the 2011 Women's County Championship. Hartley was at the time part of both the Lancashire Academy and England Academy, but a loss of form around 2012 saw her dropped from both academies, especially due to her batting and fielding. She also appeared in the 2012 Super Fours for Rubies, and took 2/28 from 10 overs in a match against Sapphires.

In 2013, Hartley moved to Middlesex to play Division 1 Championship cricket (with Lancashire at the time playing in Division 2). In the first season with her new side, she took 7 wickets in the County Championship at an average of 38.28. The following season, she was the side's leading wicket-taker in the Championship, with 9 wickets at an average of 17.66. In 2015, she achieved her Twenty20 best bowling figures, taking 4/14 against Berkshire.

In 2016, Hartley was named in the Surrey Stars squad for the inaugural Women's Cricket Super League, as one of the side's three designated England Women's Academy players. She was the side's leading wicket-taker that season (and joint-fourth overall), with 8 wickets at an average of 13.75. She was again part of the side for the following season, helping the Stars reach the semi-final and taking 9 wickets at an average of 19.22.

In 2017, Hartley returned to Lancashire, playing three matches for the side prior to the 2017 World Cup. That season, the side would go on to win the double of both the County Championship and the Twenty20 Cup. The following season, Hartley was the side's leading wicket-taker in the County Championship, with 10 wickets at an average of 17.90, and in 2019 helped the side to a second-place finish in the Championship. In 2018, reflecting her move to Lancashire in county cricket, she joined Lancashire Thunder for the 2018 Women's Cricket Super League. She took 10 wickets for the side at an average of 28.20 that season, and 6 wickets at an average of 43.33 the following season.

In 2018/19, Hartley played in Australia, joining Tasmania for the WNCL and Hobart Hurricanes for the Big Bash. She took 5 wickets for Tasmania at an average of 24.80, and 7 wickets for Hobart Hurricanes at an average of 44.57.

In 2020, after the reorganisation of domestic women's cricket in England, Hartley was named in the squad of new side North West Thunder for the 2020 Rachael Heyhoe Flint Trophy. She was subsequently named as captain of the side. Hartley was her side's leading wicket-taker in the tournament, with 11 wickets at an average of 15.45, including bowling a "magnificent" spell of 10 overs against Lightning, taking 4 wickets for 8 runs including 5 maidens. Following the season, it was announced that Hartley was one of 41 female cricketers to sign a full-time domestic contract.

In 2021, Hartley also captained Lancashire in the Twenty20 Cup, taking 5 wickets including 3/6 against North East Warriors to help her side to win the North Group of the competition. She also remained as captain of North West Thunder for the 2021 season, and took 10 wickets for the side in the Rachael Heyhoe Flint Trophy at an average of 29.50. She stood down as captain of North West Thunder ahead of the 2022 season. She was the side's leading wicket-taker in the 2022 Rachael Heyhoe Flint Trophy, taking 10 wickets including 6/24 against South East Stars.

Hartley was also retained by the Manchester Originals for the inaugural 2021 edition of The Hundred, after the 2020 season was cancelled due to the COVID-19 pandemic. She was ever-present for the side that season, taking 8 wickets at an average of 22.37. In April 2022, she was signed by the Welsh Fire for the 2022 season of The Hundred. She took four wickets at an average of 32 in the six matches she played that season.

In May 2023, Hartley announced that she was taking an immediate, indefinite break from playing cricket to focus on her mental health. She returned in August 2023 for the start of The Hundred. Later the same month on an episode of No Balls: The Cricket Podcast she announced she would retire fully from playing cricket after the conclusion of The Hundred.

== International career ==
Hartley was first called up to the England squad in 2016 for their upcoming series against Pakistan. She made her international debut in the 3rd ODI of the series, at the County Ground, Taunton on 27 June. She bowled 10 overs for 53 runs without taking a wicket. Ten days later, she made her T20 International debut in the 3rd T20I in the series against Pakistan. Hartley picked up her first international wickets in the match, finishing with figures of 2/19 from three overs.

The following winter, Hartley was part of the England tours of the West Indies and Sri Lanka. Hartley was the leading wicket-taker in the ODI series against the West Indies, with 13 wickets, a record for England in a bilateral ODI series. Hartley took her ODI best bowling figures in the final match of the series, with 4/24.

In May 2017, Hartley was named in England's squad for the 2017 Women's Cricket World Cup, held in England. Hartley played eight matches out of nine in the tournament, taking 10 wickets as the side went on to win their 4th World Cup title. Her best performance came in a group stage match against New Zealand, where she took 3/44 in a 75 run victory, whilst she took 2/58 from 10 overs in the final against India.

In September 2017, Hartley was named in England's squad to tour Australia for The Women's Ashes. Hartley played all 3 ODIs and 1 T20I on the tour, and was the pick of the bowlers with 3/45 in England's one ODI victory. In December 2017, she was named as one of the players in the ICC Women's ODI Team of the Year.

In March and April 2018, Hartley toured India with England. She took just one wicket on the tour.

Hartley was left out of the squad for England's home series against South Africa in June 2018. She returned to the squad for England's series against New Zealand but did not play a match.

In February 2019, she was awarded a full central contract by the England and Wales Cricket Board (ECB) for 2019, and was subsequently named in the squad for the side's tours of India and Sri Lanka. Hartley struggled on the India tour, and failed to take a wicket in the four matches she played. On the subsequent tour of Sri Lanka, she played two matches, picking up 3/36 and 2/39 in the 2nd and 3rd ODIs, respectively.

These would prove to be the last matches Hartley played for England. She was named in the squad for England's series against the West Indies and as cover for their Test match against Australia but did not play a match. She was then left out of the squads for the side's subsequent matches against Australia, and in October 2019 she lost her central contract, in part due to emergence of fellow spinners Sophie Ecclestone, Kirstie Gordon and Mady Villiers.

== Media career ==
In December 2019, Hartley began a podcast named No Balls: The Cricket Podcast with teammate Kate Cross. In 2021, it became part of the BBC Sounds platform. The podcast won 'Best Cricket Podcast' and 'Best Equality & Social Impact Podcast' at the 2023 Sports Podcast Awards, and 'Best Cricket Podcast' at the following year's awards.

Hartley has featured as part of the BBC's Test Match Special coverage for various cricket series and tournaments, including the 2020 ICC Women's T20 World Cup, the 2020 T20I series between the England and Pakistan men's teams, the 2021 ICC Men's T20 World Cup and the 2022 ICC Men's T20 World Cup.

Following her announcement regarding suspending her playing career in May 2023, Hartley continued her media work, appearing as part of the Test Match Special commentary team for the England v Ireland Test match that commenced on 1 June 2023.

== Coaching career ==
On 18 October 2023, Hartley was appointed Multan Sultans spin bowling coach for the 2024 Pakistan Super League. She continued with the same role in 2025 Pakistan Super League.
