= Sophie Ecclestone =

England cricketer (born 1999)

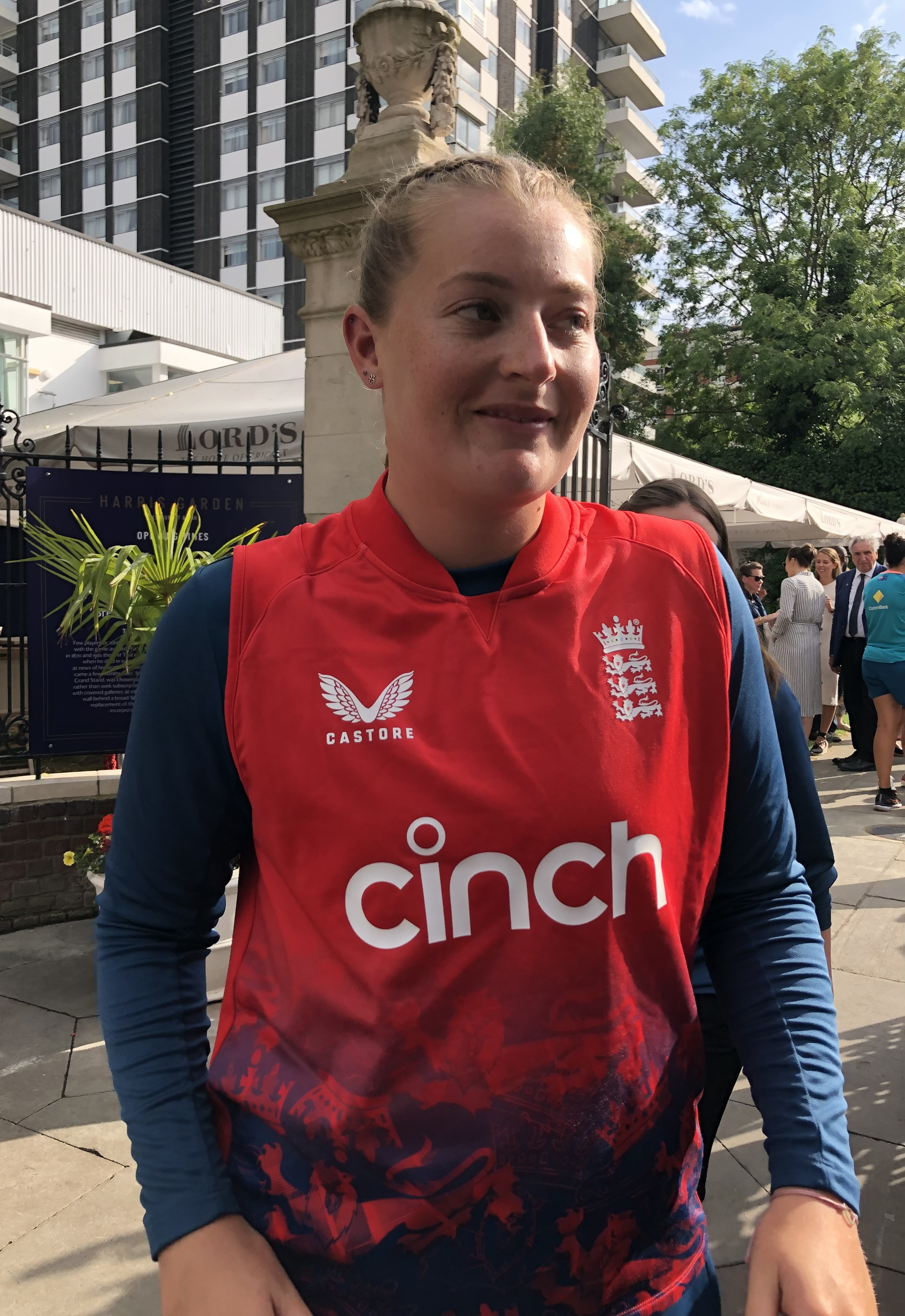
- Ecclestone at Lord's during England's T20I against Australia in July 2023

Personal information
- Born: 6 May 1999 (age 27); Chester, Cheshire, England
- Nickname: Eccy
- Height: 6 ft (183 cm)
- Batting: Right-handed
- Bowling: Slow left-arm orthodox
- Role: Bowler

International information
- National side: England (2016–present)
- Test debut (cap 157): 9 November 2017 v Australia
- Last Test: 10 July 2026 v India
- ODI debut (cap 128): 8 October 2016 v West Indies
- Last ODI: 16 May 2026 v New Zealand
- T20I debut (cap 40): 3 July 2016 v Pakistan
- Last T20I: 5 July 2026 v Australia
- T20I shirt no.: 19

Domestic team information
- Years: Team
- 2013–2014: Cheshire
- 2015–present: Lancashire
- 2016–2019: Lancashire Thunder
- 2019–2020: Trailblazers
- 2020–present: North West Thunder
- 2021–present: Manchester Originals
- 2022: Supernovas
- 2022–2024: Sydney Sixers
- 2023–present: UP Warriorz
- 2025–present: Adelaide Strikers

Career statistics
Competition	WTest	WODI	WT20I	WLA
Matches	10	84	113	139
Runs scored	257	426	368	1152
Batting average	19.76	10.65	17.52	14.40
100s/50s	0/1	0/0	0/0	0/5
Top score	50	33*	35	74
Balls bowled	2,841	4,399	2,517	7,139
Wickets	48	141	154	242
Bowling average	28.66	19.37	16.43	16.85
5 wickets in innings	4	2	0	4
10 wickets in match	1	0	0	0
Best bowling	5/63	6/36	4/18	6/12
Catches/stumpings	7/–	23/–	38/–	42/–
Medal record
Women's cricket
Representing England
T20 World Cup
Runner-up	2026 England
- Source: CricketArchive, 16 July 2026

Sophie Ecclestone (born 6 May 1999) is an English cricketer who plays for Lancashire, North West Thunder, Manchester Originals, UP Warriorz and England. In December 2018, the International Cricket Council (ICC) named her the Emerging Player of the Year. At the end of the ICC Women's T20 World Cup in March 2020, she became the world's number one bowler in Women's Twenty20 International (WT20I) cricket. In July 2021, Ecclestone was named the ICC Women's Player of the Month for June 2021. She was named as one of the 2025 Wisden Cricketers of the Year.

== Early life ==
Ecclestone was born in Chester, Cheshire, and raised in Helsby, a village in the same county. From when she was a young child, she, her older brother, James, and her father, Paul, played cricket or football outside their home, on a daily basis. She also displayed proficiency at cricket.

Ecclestone considers that her brother James, who taught her how to play both football and cricket, has been the biggest influence on her career. She received her formal cricketing education at Alvanley Cricket Club in Helsby, where her father was the junior coordinator, and she was the only girl on the club's pathway. She joined the club's junior section at seven years of age, and entered the Cheshire U13s pathway just two years later. When Ecclestone made her debut for the Alvanley boys' first team, James was one of her teammates.

Ecclestone undertook her secondary education at Helsby High School. On one occasion, she embarrassed her new school headmaster, after he allowed her to participate in an informal cricket match during the after school club. In 2020, she told BBC Sport:

"I don't think he realised I could actually play cricket ... My mum told him I could play and he said: 'Yeah, she can join in.'

I got all the boys out, and I bowled the headmaster first ball. He said to me afterwards: 'So, you're OK at cricket?'

He was so nice to me for the rest of school after that."

According to former member of the Cheshire men's team and Alvanley's then left-arm spinner, Robin Fisher, who helped Ecclestone to discover the art of finger spinning, Ecclestone was so naturally talented that she did not need much coaching. Even then, some of the Alvanley boys speculated that she would play for England when she was older, but at that time she was just playing cricket for fun. By 2022, the club had made her a life member.

Meanwhile, in 2013, Ecclestone started playing for the Cheshire women's county team. She was then spotted by Lancashire, for which she signed and made her top-level domestic debut in 2015 at the age of 16.

== Career ==
=== Domestic ===
In April 2022, she was bought by the Manchester Originals for the 2022 season of The Hundred.

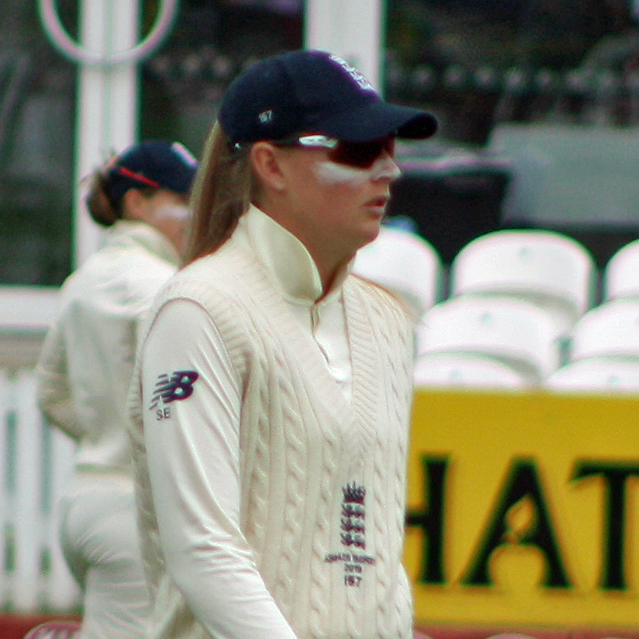
Ecclestone during the one-off Test of the 2019 Women's Ashes

=== International ===
Ecclestone was fast-tracked into England's Academy squad. In 2016, still aged 16, she was selected for the England Academy winter squad, and went on her first tour abroad, to Sri Lanka with the academy. During that tour, and despite suffering from homesickness, she took 16 wickets for the academy in a tri-series against Australia A and Sri Lanka A, including four wickets in a match against the latter team in Panagoda.

On 3 July 2016, she made her WT20I debut at the age of 17, during Pakistan's tour of England. During that match, she had the good fortune to take her first wicket with a full toss. In September 2016 she was named in the England women's One Day International squad for their tour to the West Indies the following month.

As the 2017 Women's Cricket World Cup approached, Ecclestone was in contention for selection to play for England, the ultimate winner of the tournament. However, she was still 17 years old, and had another round of exams to go before finishing school. Ecclestone, her parents and England's then coach Mark Robinson therefore decided that she would not play for England that summer.

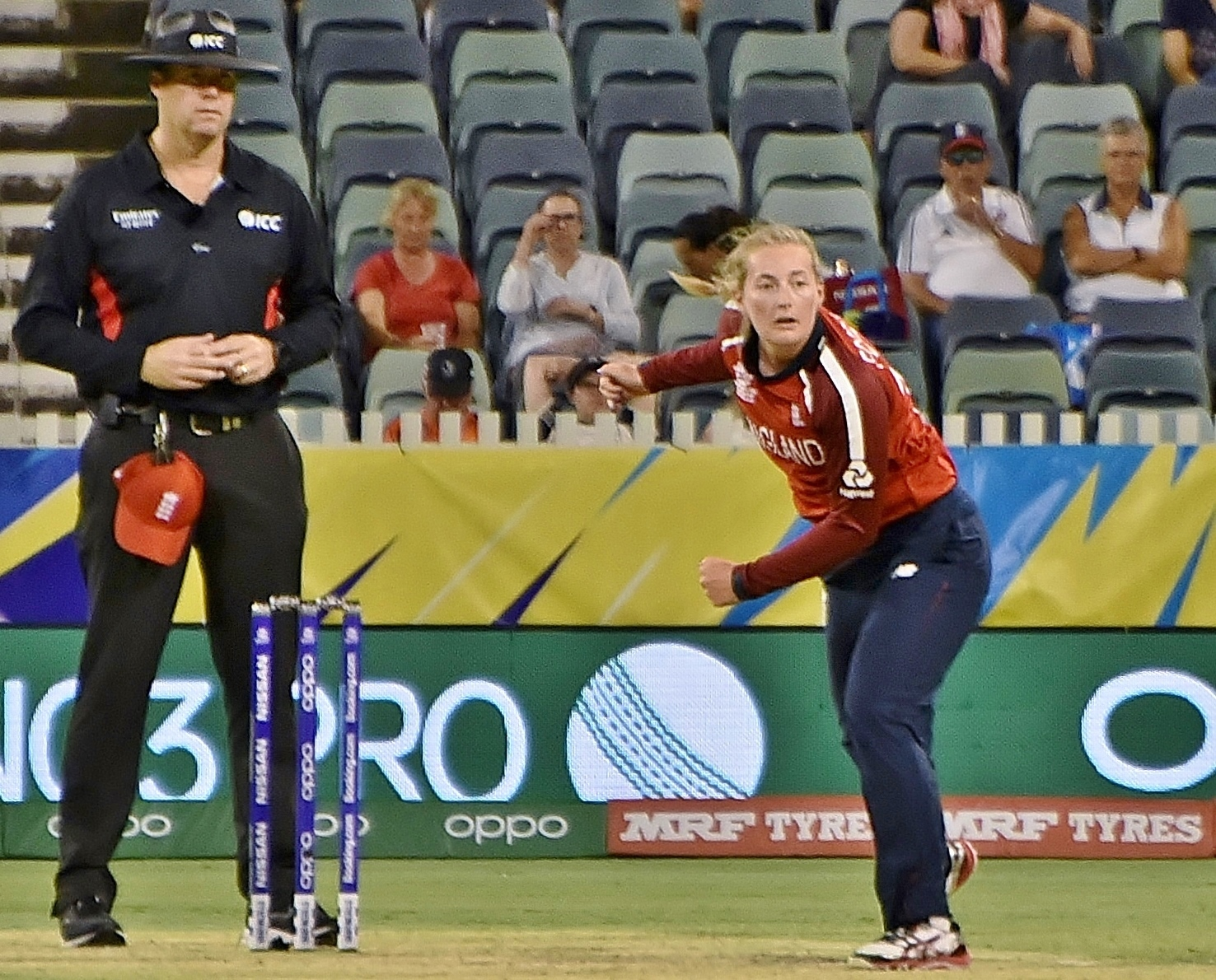
Ecclestone bowling for England during the 2020 ICC Women's T20 World Cup

Since passing those exams, Ecclestone has been a fixture in the England team. Her height of 6 feet (1.8 m), which gives her extra angle, along with her ability to control the ball, makes her suitable for all three formats of the game. On 9 November 2017, she made her Test debut for England women against Australia women in the Women's Ashes.

In October 2018, she was named in England's squad for the 2018 ICC Women's World Twenty20 tournament in the West Indies. Ahead of the tournament, she was named as one of the players to watch.

In February 2019, she was awarded a full central contract by the England and Wales Cricket Board (ECB) for 2019. In June 2019, the ECB named her in England's squad for their opening match against Australia to contest the Women's Ashes.

In January 2020, she was named in England's squad for the 2020 ICC Women's T20 World Cup in Australia. On 1 March 2020, in England's final group match of the tournament, Ecclestone took her 50th wicket in WT20Is, and her 100th wicket in international cricket. She became the youngest woman to take 50 wickets in WT20I cricket, which she achieved in 34 matches. With eight tournament wickets at an average of 6.12 and an economy rate of just 3.23, she also emerged from the tournament as the world's number one WT20I bowler.

Ecclestone was the first England bowler to hold that distinction since Anya Shrubsole in 2016, and the first England spinner to do so since Danielle Hazell in 2015. She told The Cricketer in June 2020 that when the news was released, it was both overwhelming and the fulfilment of a dream she had had for several years.

On 18 June 2020, Ecclestone was named in a squad of 24 players to begin training ahead of international women's fixtures starting in England following the COVID-19 pandemic. In February 2021, during England's tour of New Zealand, Ecclestone took her 100th international wicket. In June 2021, Ecclestone was named as in England's Test squad for their one-off match against India.

In December 2021, Ecclestone was named in England's squad for their tour to Australia to contest the Women's Ashes. In February 2022, she was named in England's team for the 2022 Women's Cricket World Cup in New Zealand. During the tournament, she took a total of 21 wickets, just two short of Lyn Fullston's all-time record for ODI World Cup tournaments; her scalps included three back-to-back three-wicket hauls. On 31 March 2022, in the semi-final match of the World Cup against South Africa, Ecclestone took her first five-wicket haul in WODIs, with 6/36.

In July 2022, she was named in England's team for the cricket tournament at the 2022 Commonwealth Games in Birmingham, England.

She was named in the England squad for the 2024 ICC Women's T20 World Cup.

Ecclestone won the Women's Cricket Award at the 2024 Cricket Writers' Club Awards. In December 2024, she was ranked no.1 T20I bowler and overtook Sadia Iqbal.

She was named in England's squad for their multi-format tour to South Africa in November 2024.

Ecclestone was named in the England squad for the 2025 Women's Ashes series in Australia.

== Personal life ==
Ecclestone told BBC Sport in 2020 that she had an ambition to become a pilot. As of 2022, she had a fiancé named Craig and a dog named Rex.

Ecclestone supports Everton Football Club.
