= North West Thunder =

English women's cricket team

Team information
- Colours: Red and dark blue
- Established: 2020
- Home ground: Old Trafford Cricket Ground; Rookwood Cricket Ground; Trafalgar Road Ground; Stanley Park; Sedbergh School

History
- RHFT wins: 0
- CEC wins: 0
- Official website: Thunder Cricket
Playing kit

North West Thunder, commonly referred to as Thunder, were a women's cricket team that represented Lancashire and North West England, one of eight regional hubs in English domestic women's cricket. They played their home matches at various grounds, including Old Trafford Cricket Ground. They were captained by Eleanor Threlkeld and coached by Chris Read. The team carried over many elements of the WCSL team Lancashire Thunder, but were partnered with Lancashire, Cheshire and Cumbria.

At the end of the 2024 season, following reforms to the structure of women's domestic cricket, the team was effectively replaced by a professionalised Lancashire team.

== History ==
In 2020, women's cricket in England was restructured, creating eight new 'regional hub' teams, with the intention of playing both 50-over and 20-over cricket. North West Thunder were one of the sides created under this structure, effectively replacing the Women's Cricket Super League team Lancashire Thunder and representing Lancashire and North West England, partnering with Lancashire, Cheshire and Cumbria. The side was to be captained by Alex Hartley and coached by Paul Shaw. Due to the COVID-19 pandemic, the 2020 season was truncated, and only 50-over cricket was played, in the Rachael Heyhoe Flint Trophy. North West Thunder finished third in the North Group of the competition, winning two of their six matches. At the end of the season, five Thunder players were given full-time domestic contracts, the first of their kind in England: Alex Hartley, Georgie Boyce, Emma Lamb, Eleanor Threlkeld and Hannah Jones.

The following season, 2021, North West Thunder competed in both the Rachael Heyhoe Flint Trophy and the newly-formed Twenty20 competition, the Charlotte Edwards Cup. In the Charlotte Edwards Cup the side finished third in their group, winning two of their six matches, as well as their away match against Sunrisers ending in a tie. Thunder batter Emma Lamb hit the first Charlotte Edwards Cup century in the reverse fixture against Sunrisers, as her side made the highest team score of the tournament, 186/1. In the Rachael Heyhoe Flint Trophy, the team finished seventh in the group of eight, winning three of their seven matches. North West Thunder bowler Hannah Jones was the joint-second highest wicket-taker in the tournament, with 14 wickets.

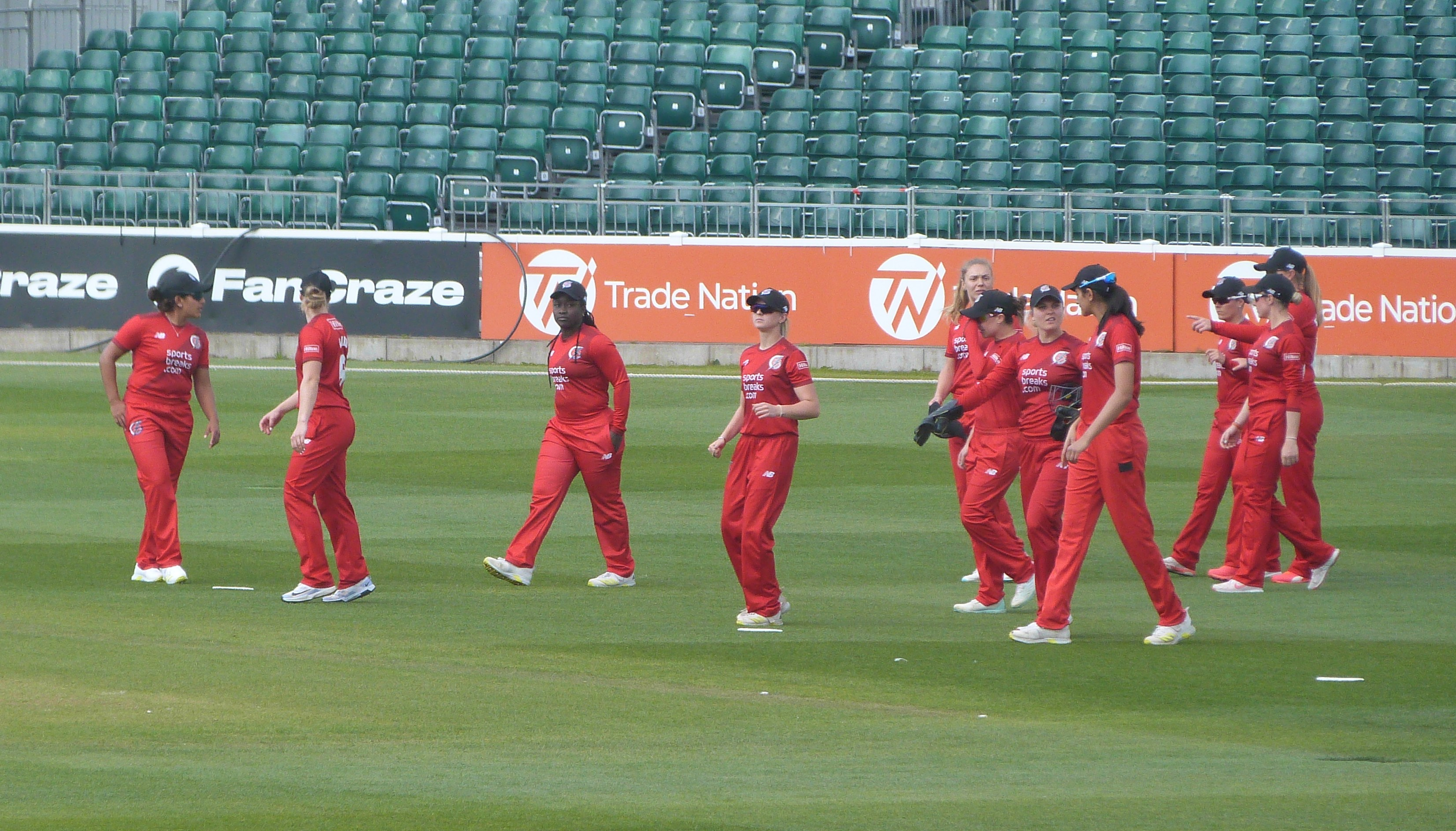
North West Thunder take the field during their match against Western Storm in May 2023.

Ahead of the 2022 season, Hartley stood down as captain of the side. Eleanor Threlkeld was named as her replacement. The side finished third in their group in the Charlotte Edwards Cup that season, winning two of their six matches. The side finished seventh in the group of eight in the Rachael Heyhoe Flint Trophy.

In 2023, the side qualified for the knockout stages of a tournament for the first time, doing so in the Charlotte Edwards Cup after winning four of their last five matches. However, they lost in the semi-final to Southern Vipers. The side finished seventh in the Rachael Heyhoe Flint Trophy, winning three matches. Head Coach Paul Shaw stepped down from his role at the end of the season, and was later replaced by Chris Read. In 2024, the side finished fifth in the Charlotte Edwards Cup and finished sixth in the Rachael Heyhoe Flint Trophy.

2024 was the side's final season, with reforms to the structure of domestic cricket in England meaning that the side was effectively replaced by a professionalised Lancashire team.

== Home grounds ==
Venue	Games hosted by season					
Venue	20	21	22	23	24	Total
Aigburth Cricket Ground, Liverpool	2	–	–	–	–	2
Chester Boughton Hall Cricket Club	–	4	–	–	–	4
Old Trafford Cricket Ground	–	1	4	5	7	17
Rookwood Cricket Ground, Sale	–	1	2	2	1	6
Trafalgar Road Ground	–	–	1	1	1	3
Stanley Park	–	–	–	2	2	4
Sedbergh School	–	–	–	1	1	2

== Players ==
=== Overseas players ===
- Piepa Cleary – Australia (2021)
- (Cricket West Indies) Deandra Dottin – West Indies (2022–2023)
- Laura Delany – Ireland (2023)
- Katie Mack – Australia (2024)
- Georgia Voll – Australia (2024)

== Seasons ==
=== Rachael Heyhoe Flint Trophy ===
Season	Final standing	League standings									Notes
Season	Final standing	P	W	L	T	NR	BP	Pts	NRR	Pos	Notes
2020	Group stage	6	2	4	0	0	1	9	−0.515	3rd	DNQ
2021	Group stage	7	3	4	0	0	1	13	−0.620	7th	DNQ
2022	Group stage	7	1	5	0	1	0	6	−0.366	7th	DNQ
2023	Group stage	14	3	5	2	4	2	26	−0.274	7th	DNQ
2024	Group stage	14	5	8	0	1	3	25	−0.013	6th	DNQ

=== Charlotte Edwards Cup ===
Season	Final standing	League standings									Notes
Season	Final standing	P	W	L	T	NR	BP	Pts	NRR	Pos	Notes
2021	Group stages	6	2	3	1	0	1	11	+0.029	3rd	DNQ
2022	Group stages	6	2	4	0	0	2	10	–0.190	3rd	DNQ
2023	Losing semi-finalists: 3rd	7	4	3	0	0	2	18	+0.331	3rd	Lost to Southern Vipers in the semi-final
2024	Group stages	10	3	6	0	1	1	15	–0.727	5th	DNQ

== Statistics ==
=== Rachael Heyhoe Flint Trophy ===
Rachael Heyhoe Flint Trophy – summary of results
Year	Played	Wins	Losses	Tied	NR	Win %
2020	6	2	4	0	0	33.33
2021	7	3	4	0	0	42.86
2022	7	1	5	0	1	14.29
2023	14	3	5	2	4	21.43
2024	14	5	8	0	1	35.71
Total	48	14	26	2	6	29.17

- Abandoned matches are counted as NR (no result)
- Win or loss by super over or boundary count are counted as tied.

Rachael Heyhoe Flint Trophy – teamwise result summary
Opposition	Mat	Won	Lost	Tied	NR	Win %
Central Sparks	8	3	4	1	0	37.50
Northern Diamonds	8	1	7	0	0	12.50
South East Stars	6	3	3	0	0	50.00
Southern Vipers	6	0	4	1	1	0.00
Sunrisers	6	2	1	0	3	33.33
The Blaze	8	3	3	0	2	37.50
Western Storm	6	2	4	0	0	33.33

=== Charlotte Edwards Cup ===
Charlotte Edwards Cup - summary of results
Year	Played	Wins	Losses	Tied	NR	Win %
2021	6	2	3	1	0	33.33
2022	6	2	4	0	0	33.33
2023	8	4	4	0	0	50.00
2024	10	3	6	0	1	30.00
Total	30	11	17	1	1	36.67

- Abandoned matches are counted as NR (no result)
- Win or loss by super over or boundary count are counted as tied.

Charlotte Edwards Cup - teamwise result summary
Opposition	Mat	Won	Lost	Tied	NR	Win %
Central Sparks	3	2	1	0	0	66.67
Northern Diamonds	7	4	3	0	0	57.14
South East Stars	2	1	1	0	0	50.00
Southern Vipers	5	0	5	0	0	0.00
Sunrisers	4	3	0	1	0	75.00
The Blaze	5	1	4	0	0	20.00
Western Storm	4	0	3	0	1	0.00

== Records ==
=== Rachael Heyhoe Flint Trophy ===
- Highest team total: 292/5, v Sunrisers on 24 April 2024.
- Lowest (completed) team total: 110 v Southern Vipers on 10 September 2021.
- Highest individual score: 121, Emma Lamb v Western Storm on 29 May 2021.
- Best individual bowling analysis: 6/24, Alex Hartley v South East Stars on 16 July 2022.
- Most runs: 1,065 runs in 28 matches, Emma Lamb.
- Most wickets: 49 wickets in 35 matches, Hannah Jones.

=== Charlotte Edwards Cup ===
- Highest team total: 186/1, v Sunrisers on 9 July 2021.
- Lowest (completed) team total: 61 v Northern Diamonds on 19 June 2024.
- Highest individual score: 111*, Emma Lamb v Sunrisers on 9 July 2021.
- Best individual bowling analysis: 5/15, Sophie Ecclestone v Lightning on 3 June 2022.
- Most runs: 837 runs in 25 matches, Emma Lamb.
- Most wickets: 18 wickets in 16 matches, Kate Cross.

== See also ==
- Cheshire Women cricket team
- Cumbria Women cricket team
- Lancashire Women cricket team
- Lancashire Thunder
