= Lancashire Women cricket team =

English county cricket team

Lancashire Women

Personnel
- Captain: Ellie Threlkeld
- Coach: Chris Read
- Overseas player: Meg Lanning

Team information
- Founded: Unknown First recorded match: 1933
- Home ground: Various Including Beaconsfield Road, Widnes

History
- WCC wins: 1
- T20 Cup wins: 1
- T20 County Cup wins: 1
- Official website: Lancashire Cricket

The Lancashire Women's cricket team is the women's representative cricket team for the English historic county of Lancashire. They play their home games at various grounds across the county, including Beaconsfield Road, Widnes. They are coached by Chris Chambers and captained by Eleanor Threlkeld. They won both the County Championship and the Twenty20 Cup in 2017. Lancashire have links with Cumbria, with some players playing for both sides, as well as some of their players making up a North Representative XI in 2021 and 2022. They are partnered with the regional side North West Thunder.

== History ==
=== 1930–1997: Early History ===
Lancashire Women played their first game in 1930, against the Women's Cricket Association, which they won by 111 runs. Over the following years, Lancashire played various one-off games, often against nearby counties such as Yorkshire and Cheshire. They also competed in the Women's Area Championship, and the inaugural Women's County Championship, as a combined team with Cheshire, Lancashire and Cheshire Women.

=== 1998– : Women's County Championship ===
1998 was the first season in which Lancashire competed in the County Championship on their own, and they finished 3rd in Division 3, before being promoted the following season. Over the following seasons, Lancashire bounced between the divisions, having a four-year stint in Division One, from 2004 to 2007, but also reaching as low as Division Three in 2010 and 2011. They topped Division Two in 2013 and 2014: in 2013 they lost the Division Final to Somerset, but managed to gain promotion in 2014. They were relegated in 2015, but bounced straight back up to Division One in 2016.

Lancashire then went on to have an exceptional 2017 season, in which they won both the County Championship and the Women's Twenty20 Cup. In the Championship, they topped Division One with 5 wins from 7 games. Lancashire bowler Sophie Ecclestone was the leading wicket-taker in the Division, while Amy Satterthwaite and Evelyn Jones were the 3rd and 4th leading run-scorers, respectively. Meanwhile in the T20 Cup, Lancashire won 7 from 8 games to claim the title, with batter Emma Lamb ending the tournament as the leading run-scorer for the division. In the following years, Lancashire retained their place in Division One of the Championship without seriously challenging for the title, whilst managing a second-place finish in the 2019 Women's Twenty20 Cup, one point behind Champions Warwickshire. In 2021, they competed in the North Group of the Twenty20 Cup, and won their region, with 4 wins and 4 matches abandoned due to rain. Batter Emma Lamb was the third-highest run-scorer across the competition, with 233 runs including one century. They again won their group in the 2022 Women's Twenty20 Cup, going unbeaten in the group stage before beating Yorkshire in the final. Batter Georgie Boyce was the leading run-scorer in the competition, with 306 runs, whilst bowlers Alex Hartley and Phoebe Graham were joint-second leading wicket-takers, with 13 wickets. They won their Women's Twenty20 Cup group for the third consecutive season in 2023, defeating Scotland in the final. In 2024, the side finished 2nd in their group in the Twenty20 Cup and won their group in the new ECB Women's County One-Day tournament.

== Players ==
=== Current squad ===
- No. denotes the player's squad number, as worn on the back of their shirt.
- ‡ denotes players with international caps.

No.	Name	Nationality	Birth date	Batting style	Bowling style	Notes
Batters
5	Meg Lanning ‡	Australia	25 March 1992 (age 34)	Right-handed	Right-arm medium	Overseas player
6	Emma Lamb ‡	England	16 December 1997 (age 28)	Right-handed	Right-arm off break	England skills contract
11	Eve Jones	England	8 August 1992 (age 34)	Left-handed	Left-arm medium	
32	Ailsa Lister ‡	Scotland	8 April 2004 (age 22)	Right-handed	—	
45	Tilly Kesteven	England	30 November 2004 (age 21)	Left-handed	Right-arm leg break	
—	Riva Pindoria	England	16 August 2006 (age 20)	Right-handed	Right-arm off break	
All-rounders
76	Darcey Carter ‡	Scotland	31 May 2005 (age 21)	Right-handed	Right-arm off break	
Wicket-keepers
21	Ellie Threlkeld	England	16 November 1998 (age 27)	Right-handed	—	Club captain
Bowlers
3	Sophie Morris	England	2 January 2004 (age 22)	Left-handed	Slow left-arm orthodox	
9	Grace Potts	England	12 July 2002 (age 24)	Right-handed	Right-arm medium	
18	Mahika Gaur ‡	England (Note: Gaur has also played international cricket for the United Arab Emirates.)	9 March 2006 (age 20)	Right-handed	Left-arm fast-medium	England central contract
19	Sophie Ecclestone ‡	England	6 May 1999 (age 27)	Right-handed	Slow left-arm orthodox	England central contract
24	Tara Norris ‡	United States	4 June 1998 (age 28)	Left-handed	Left-arm medium	UK passport
53	Grace Johnson	England	21 December 2004 (age 21)	Right-handed	Right-arm medium	
—	Josie Groves	England	5 September 2004 (age 22)	Right-handed	Right-arm leg break	
Source: Updated: 1 October 2026

=== Notable players ===
Players who have played for Lancashire and played internationally are listed below, in order of first international appearance (given in brackets):

- (England) Joy Liebert (1934)
- (England) Betty Snowball (1934)
- (England) June Bragger (1963)
- (England) Avril Starling (1982)
- (England) Carole Hodges (1982)
- (England) Laura Newton (1997)
- (South Africa) Sune van Zyl (1999)
- (England) Arran Brindle (1999)
- (England) Leanne Davis (2000)
- (Cricket West Indies) Nelly Williams (2003)
- (South Africa) Lonell de Beer (2005)
- (New Zealand) Amy Satterthwaite (2007)
- (England) Kate Cross (2013)
- (England) Alex Hartley (2016)
- (England) Sophie Ecclestone (2016)
- (Hong Kong) Jasmine Titmuss (2019)
- (England) Emma Lamb (2021)
- (England) Seren Smale (2024)

== Seasons ==
=== Women's County Championship ===
Season	Division	League standings								Notes
Season	Division	P	W	L	T	A/C	BP	Pts	Pos	Notes
1998	Division 3	5	3	2	0	0	36	72	3rd	
1999	Division 3	5	5	0	0	0	44	104	1st	Promoted
2000	Division 2	5	3	2	0	0	37.5	73.5	2nd	
2001	Division 2	5	3	2	0	0	36	72	2nd	
2002	Division 2	5	3	0	0	2	22.5	80.5	2nd	
2003	Division 2	5	4	0	0	1	34	93	1st	Promoted
2004	Division 1	5	2	3	0	0	34	58	4th	
2005	Division 1	6	2	3	0	1	40	75	3rd	
2006	Division 1	6	1	5	0	0	20	40	3rd	
2007	Division 1	6	0	5	0	1	16	26	4th	Relegated
2008	Division 2	6	3	3	0	0	3	63	3rd	
2009	Division 2	10	1	9	0	0	22	42	6th	Relegated
2010	Division 3	10	6	3	0	1	53	113	3rd	
2011	Division 3	9	3	5	1	0	43	78	5th	Promoted
2012	Division 2	8	4	3	0	1	44	84	4th	
2013	Division 2	8	8	0	0	0	58	138	1st	Lost Division 2 final
2014	Division 2	8	6	1	0	1	29	109	1st	Promoted
2015	Division 1	8	0	8	0	0	23	23	9th	Relegated
2016	Division 2	7	4	1	0	2	35	75	1st	Promoted
2017	Division 1	7	5	2	0	0	49	99	1st	Champions
2018	Division 1	7	3	4	0	0	41	71	4th	
2019	Division 1	7	4	3	0	0	42	82	4th	

=== Women's Twenty20 Cup ===
Season	Division	League standings								Notes
Season	Division	P	W	L	T	A/C	NRR	Pts	Pos	Notes
2009	Division 2	3	1	1	0	1	−0.45	3	2nd	
2010	Division M&N 2	3	0	2	0	1	−0.69	1	3rd	
2011	Division M&N 2	3	1	2	0	0	−1.16	2	3rd	
2012	Division M&N 2	3	1	1	0	1	−0.22	2	2nd	Lost promotion play-off
2013	Division M&N 2	2	0	1	0	1	−4.85	1	2nd	
2014	Division 2B	4	2	2	0	0	+0.32	8	4th	
2015	Division 2	8	8	0	0	0	+2.28	32	1st	Promoted
2016	Division 1	7	3	4	0	0	−0.64	12	5th	
2017	Division 1	8	7	1	0	0	+1.48	28	1st	Champions
2018	Division 1	8	4	4	0	0	−0.16	16	6th	
2019	Division 1	8	4	1	0	3	+0.77	19	2nd	
2021	North	8	4	0	0	4	+5.07	20	1st	Group winners
2022	Group 1	6	6	0	0	0	+3.12	24	1st	Group winners
2023	Group 1	6	1	1	0	4	+2.50	8	2nd	Group winners
2024	Group 1	7	6	1	0	0	+1.19	88	2nd	

=== ECB Women's County One-Day ===
Season	Group	League standings								Notes
Season	Group	P	W	L	T	A/C	BP	Pts	Pos	Notes
2024	Group 1	4	3	0	0	1	2	15	1st	Group winners

=== Women's One-Day ===
Season	League	League standings								Notes
Season	League	P	W	L	T	NR	BP	Pts	Pos	Notes
2025	League 1	14	9	4	0	1	3	41	3rd	Advanced to knockout stage. Champions after knockout stage.
2026	League 1	0	0	0	0	0	0	0		

== Honours ==
- County Championship:
  - Division One champions (1) – 2018
  - Division Two champions (3) – 2003, 2014 & 2016
  - Division Three champions (1) – 1999
- Women's Twenty20 Cup
  - Division One champions (1) – 2017
  - Division Two champions (1) – 2015
  - Group winners (3) – 2021, 2022 & 2023
- Women's T20 County Cup:
  - Winners (1) – 2025
- ECB Women's County One-Day:
  - Group winners (1) – 2024
- Women's One-Day Cup
  - Winners (1) - 2025

== See also ==
- Lancashire County Cricket Club
- North West Thunder
- North Representative XI
