= 2023 North West Thunder season =

English cricket season

North West Thunder
2023 season
- Coach: Paul Shaw
- Captain: Eleanor Threlkeld
- Overseas player: (Cricket West Indies) Deandra Dottin (Ireland) Laura Delany
- RHFT: 7th
- CEC: 3rd
- Most runs: RHFT: Eleanor Threlkeld (287); CEC: Fi Morris (209)
- Most wickets: RHFT: Olivia Bell (14); CEC: Olivia Bell (11)
- Most catches: RHFT: Fi Morris (7); CEC: Deandra Dottin (6)
- Most wicket-keeping dismissals: RHFT: Eleanor Threlkeld (9); CEC: Eleanor Threlkeld (6)

The 2023 season was North West Thunder's fourth season, in which they competed in the 50 over Rachael Heyhoe Flint Trophy and the Twenty20 Charlotte Edwards Cup. In the Charlotte Edwards Cup, the side finished third in the group, winning four matches and progressing to the semi-final. In the semi-final, they lost to Southern Vipers by 18 runs. In the Rachael Heyhoe Flint Trophy, the side finished seventh in the group, winning three of their fourteen matches.

The side was captained by Eleanor Threlkeld and coached by Paul Shaw. They played five home matches at Old Trafford Cricket Ground, two apiece at Rookwood Cricket Ground and Stanley Park, and one apiece at Trafalgar Road Ground and Sedbergh School.

== Squad ==
=== Departures ===
On 4 November 2022, it was announced that Natalie Brown, Rebecca Duckworth and Alice Dyson had all been released. In July 2023, Phoebe Graham went on loan to Western Storm for four Rachael Heyhoe Flint Trophy matches. Alex Hartley retired from cricket in August 2023, after taking a break from the game in May. On 8 September 2023, it was announced that the side had loaned Sophia Turner to Northern Diamonds for the remainder of the season.

=== Arrivals ===
On 4 November 2022, it was announced that North West Thunder had signed Naomi Dattani, Fi Morris and Tara Norris from Sunrisers, Western Storm and Southern Vipers respectively. On 6 March 2023, it was confirmed that Stephanie Butler, having left Central Sparks at the end of the 2022 season, had joined the side. On 19 April 2023, it was announced that Deandra Dottin had signed for the side as an overseas player for the entire season, alongside Scotland international Hannah Rainey. On 21 April 2023, it was confirmed that Olivia Thomas was in the side's squad for the season. On 28 April 2023, Mahika Gaur was named in a matchday squad for the first time. On 20 May 2023, Olivia Bell was named in a matchday squad for the first time. On 6 June 2023, academy player Sophie Morris was named in a matchday squad for the first time. On 1 September 2023, it was announced that Laura Delany was replacing Deandra Dottin as the overseas player for the side, due to the latter's involvement in the 2023 Women's Caribbean Premier League.

=== Personnel and contract changes ===
On 4 November 2022, it was announced that Daisy Mullan had signed her first professional contract with the side. On 23 February 2023, it was announced that a further two players had signed professional contracts, with Liberty Heap and Seren Smale both signing their first such contracts. On 29 June 2023, it was announced that both Danielle Collins and Mahika Gaur had signed professional contracts with the club, Collins until the end of the season and Gaur on a part-time professional deal until the end of 2024. In September 2023, it was announced that Head Coach Paul Shaw was stepping down from his role at the end of the season.

=== Squad list ===
- Age given is at the start of North West Thunder's first match of the season (22 April 2023).

Name	Nationality	Birth date	Batting Style	Bowling Style	Notes
Batters
Danielle Collins	England	7 July 2000 (aged 22)	Left-handed	Right-arm medium	
Laura Marshall	England	1 November 1993 (aged 29)	Right-handed	Right-arm medium	
Daisy Mullan	England	29 November 2002 (aged 20)	Right-handed	Right-arm medium	
Shachi Pai	England	10 October 1998 (aged 24)	Right-handed	Right-arm medium	
All-rounders
Stephanie Butler	England	23 April 1994 (aged 28)	Left-handed	Right-arm off break	
Laura Delany	Ireland	23 December 1992 (aged 30)	Right-handed	Right-arm medium	Overseas player; September 2023
Naomi Dattani	England	28 April 1994 (aged 28)	Right-handed	Right-arm medium	
Deandra Dottin	West Indies	21 June 1991 (aged 31)	Right-handed	Right-arm medium	Overseas player; April to July 2023
Liberty Heap	England	16 September 2003 (aged 19)	Right-handed	Right-arm off break	
Emma Lamb	England	16 December 1997 (aged 25)	Right-handed	Right-arm off break	
Fi Morris	England	31 January 1994 (aged 29)	Right-handed	Right-arm off break	
Wicket-keepers
Alice Clarke	England	4 August 2001 (aged 21)	Left-handed	Right-arm medium	
Seren Smale	Wales	13 December 2004 (aged 18)	Right-handed	—	
Eleanor Threlkeld	England	16 November 1998 (aged 24)	Right-handed	—	Captain
Bowlers
Olivia Bell	Scotland	12 November 2003 (aged 19)	Right-handed	Right-arm off break	Joined May 2023
Kate Cross	England	3 October 1991 (aged 31)	Right-handed	Right-arm medium-fast	
Sophie Ecclestone	England	6 May 1999 (aged 23)	Right-handed	Slow left-arm orthodox	
Mahika Gaur	England (Note: Gaur has also played international cricket for the United Arab Emirates.)	9 March 2006 (aged 17)	Right-handed	Left-arm medium	Joined April 2023
Phoebe Graham	England	23 October 1991 (aged 31)	Right-handed	Right-arm medium	Four match loan to Western Storm in July 2023
Alex Hartley	England	6 September 1993 (aged 29)	Right-handed	Slow left-arm orthodox	Retired from all formats of cricket in August 2023
Laura Jackson	England	27 December 1997 (aged 25)	Right-handed	Right-arm medium	
Hannah Jones	England	10 February 1999 (aged 24)	Left-handed	Slow left-arm orthodox	
Sophie Morris	England	2 January 2004 (aged 19)	Right-handed	Slow left-arm orthodox	Joined June 2023
Tara Norris	United States	4 June 1998 (aged 24)	Left-handed	Left-arm medium	
Hannah Rainey	Scotland	2 June 1997 (aged 25)	Right-handed	Right-arm medium	
Olivia Thomas	England	3 May 2004 (aged 18)	Right-handed	Right-arm leg break	
Sophia Turner	England	23 April 2003 (aged 19)	Right-handed	Right-arm medium	Three match loan to Northern Diamonds in September 2023

== Rachael Heyhoe Flint Trophy ==
=== Season standings ===
Pos	Team	Pld	W	L	T	NR	BP	Pts	NRR
1	Southern Vipers (Q)	14	7	4	1	2	4	38	0.457
2	The Blaze (Q)	14	7	4	0	3	4	38	0.173
3	South East Stars (Q)	14	7	6	0	1	6	36	0.583
4	Sunrisers	14	6	5	0	3	2	32	−0.006
5	Central Sparks	14	6	5	1	2	1	31	−0.233
6	Northern Diamonds	14	6	7	0	1	4	30	−0.034
7	North West Thunder	14	3	5	2	4	2	26	−0.274
8	Western Storm	14	2	8	0	4	0	16	−1.068

Source: England and Wales Cricket Board

advanced to the final advanced to the play-off

=== Fixtures ===
22 April 2023
10:30
Scorecard

South East Stars; 334/5 (50 overs)	v	North West Thunder; 203 (42 overs)
Paige Scholfield 111* (90); Alex Hartley 1/22 (4 overs)		Deandra Dottin 51 (42); Freya Davies 3/27 (8 overs)

South East Stars won by 131 runs
Old Trafford Cricket Ground, Manchester
Umpires: Anna Harris and Hassan Adnan

- South East Stars won the toss and elected to bat.
- Points: South East Stars 5, North West Thunder 0

29 April 2023
10:30
Scorecard

North West Thunder; 214 (44.4 overs)	v	Western Storm; 215/4 (41.3 overs)
Emma Lamb 74 (85); Chloe Skelton 3/36 (8 overs)		Orla Prendergast 115 (115); Mahika Gaur 3/39 (10 overs)

Western Storm won by 6 wickets
Sophia Gardens, Cardiff
Umpires: Paul Baldwin and Anna Harris

- North West Thunder won the toss and elected to bat.
- Points: Western Storm 4, North West Thunder 0

1 May 2023
10:30
Scorecard

The Blaze	v	North West Thunder

Match abandoned
John Fretwell Sporting Complex, Nettleworth

- No toss.
- No play was possible due to rain.
- Points: The Blaze 2, North West Thunder 2

6 May 2023
10:30
Scorecard

North West Thunder; 234 (47.1 overs)	v	Central Sparks; 223/9 (45 overs)
Sophie Ecclestone 74 (65); Erin Burns 4/56 (10 overs)		Evelyn Jones 69 (106); Kate Cross 3/40 (9 overs)

Match Tied (DLS method)
Old Trafford Cricket Ground, Manchester
Umpires: Anthony Harris and Joanne Ibbotson

- Central Sparks won the toss and elected to field.
- Central Sparks were set a revised target of 224 runs from 45 overs due to rain.
- Points: Central Sparks 2, North West Thunder 2

10 May 2023
10:30
Scorecard

North West Thunder; 60/2 (15 overs)	v	Sunrisers
Emma Lamb 38* (48); Eva Gray 2/23 (7 overs)

No result
Rookwood Cricket Ground, Sale
Umpires: Grace Bambury and Steve O'Shaughnessy

- Sunrisers won the toss and elected to field.
- Match reduced to 34 overs per side due to rain.
- No further play was possible due to rain.
- Points: North West Thunder 2, Sunrisers 2

2 July 2023
10:30
Scorecard

Central Sparks; 233 (50 overs)	v	North West Thunder; 204 (48.4 overs)
Ami Campbell 68 (72); Tara Norris 4/42 (9 overs)		Seren Smale 94 (125); Katie George 3/57 (9.4 overs)

Central Sparks won by 29 runs
New Road, Worcester
Umpires: James Middlebrook and Sam Hollingshead

- North West Thunder won the toss and elected to field.
- Points: Central Sparks 4, North West Thunder 0

7 July 2023
10:30
Scorecard

Southern Vipers; 262/8 (50 overs)	v	North West Thunder; 262/8 (50 overs)
Emily Windsor 49 (62); Emma Lamb 2/35 (7 overs)		Eleanor Threlkeld 60 (60); Maitlan Brown 3/52 (10 overs)

Match Tied
Trafalgar Road Ground, Southport
Umpires: Grace Banbury and Hassan Adnan

- Southern Vipers won the toss and elected to bat.
- Points: North West Thunder 2, Southern Vipers 2

11 July 2023
10:30
Scorecard

Northern Diamonds; 167 (50 overs)	v	North West Thunder; 168/4 (38.4 overs)
Lauren Winfield-Hill 33 (38); Naomi Dattani 4/16 (6.5 overs)		Deandra Dottin 54* (86); Katie Levick 2/43 (8 overs)

North West Thunder won by 6 wickets
Clifton Park, York
Umpires: Amy Clark and Anthony Harris

- North West Thunder won the toss and elected to field.
- North West Thunder 5, Northern Diamonds 0

14 July 2023
10:30
Scorecard

Sunrisers	v	North West Thunder

Match abandoned
County Ground, Northampton

- No toss.
- No play was possible due to rain.
- Points: Sunrisers 2, North West Thunder 2

22 July 2023
10:30
Scorecard

North West Thunder	v	The Blaze

Match abandoned
Sedbergh School, Sedbergh
Umpires: Amy Clark and Peter Hartley

- No toss.
- No play was possible due to rain.
- Points: North West Thunder 2, The Blaze 2

5 September 2023
10:30
Scorecard

South East Stars; 145 (37.5 overs)	v	North West Thunder; 147/4 (25.5 overs)
Paige Scholfield 38 (48); Olivia Bell 4/23 (8.5 overs)		Emma Lamb 50 (59); Paige Scholfield 1/8 (4 overs)

North West Thunder won by 6 wickets
Woodbridge Road, Guildford
Umpires: Fiona Richards and Waseem Mohammed

- South East Stars won the toss and elected to bat.
- Points: North West Thunder 5, South East Stars 0

9 September 2023
10:30
Scorecard

Southern Vipers; 237 (47.5 overs)	v	North West Thunder; 173 (44.3 overs)
Georgia Adams 71 (70); Olivia Bell 3/45 (8.5 overs)		Fi Morris 52 (55); Mary Taylor 4/39 (8.3 overs)

Southern Vipers won by 64 runs
Arundel Castle Cricket Ground, Arundel
Umpires: Anthony Harris and Hassan Adnan

- Southern Vipers won the toss and elected to bat.
- Points: Southern Vipers 5, Thunder 0

13 September 2023
10:30
Scorecard

Northern Diamonds; 196 (46.4 overs)	v	North West Thunder; 148 (33.4 overs)
Lauren Winfield-Hill 89 (90); Olivia Bell 4/32 (10 overs)		Seren Smale 33 (50); Katie Levick 4/28 (10 overs)

Northern Diamonds won by 48 runs
Rookwood Cricket Ground, Sale
Umpires: Joanne Ibbotson and Naeem Ashraf

- North West Thunder won the toss and elected to field.
- Points: Northern Diamonds 5, North West Thunder 0

16 September 2023
10:30
Scorecard

Western Storm; 250/7 (50 overs)	v	North West Thunder; 254/5 (46.4 overs)
Sophia Smale 56 (82); Olivia Bell 3/30 (10 overs)		Eleanor Threlkeld 107* (115); Sophia Smale 2/21 (10 overs)

North West Thunder won by 5 wickets
Old Trafford Cricket Ground, Manchester
Umpires: Ben Peverall and Grace Bambury

- Western Storm won the toss and elected to bat.
- Points: North West Thunder 5, Western Storm 0

=== Tournament statistics ===
==== Batting ====
Player	Matches	Innings	Runs	Average	High score	100s	50s
Eleanor Threlkeld	11	11	287	41.00	107*	1	1
Naomi Dattani	10	10	263	26.30	82	0	1
Emma Lamb	7	7	250	41.66	74	0	3

Source: ESPN Cricinfo Qualification: 200 runs.

==== Bowling ====
Player	Matches	Overs	Wickets	Average	Economy	BBI	5wi
Olivia Bell	4	37.4	14	9.28	3.45	4/23	0
Tara Norris	10	68.0	10	35.40	5.20	4/42	0

Source: ESPN Cricinfo Qualification: 10 wickets.

== Charlotte Edwards Cup ==
=== Season standings ===
Pos	Team	Pld	W	L	T	NR	BP	Pts	NRR
1	The Blaze (Q)	7	7	0	0	0	4	32	1.765
2	Southern Vipers (Q)	7	5	2	0	0	2	22	0.940
3	North West Thunder (Q)	7	4	3	0	0	2	18	0.331
4	Northern Diamonds	7	4	3	0	0	1	17	−0.129
5	South East Stars	7	3	4	0	0	0	12	−0.096
6	Western Storm	7	3	4	0	0	0	12	−0.512
7	Central Sparks	7	2	5	0	0	0	8	−0.558
8	Sunrisers	7	0	7	0	0	0	0	−1.717

Source: England and Wales Cricket Board

advanced to final advanced to the semi-final

=== Fixtures ===
21 May 2023
14:30 BST
Scorecard

North West Thunder; 154/7 (20 overs)	v	Western Storm; 155/4 (19.2 overs)
Emma Lamb 36 (22); Orla Prendergast 2/36 (4 overs)		Heather Knight 62 (41); Sophie Ecclestone 2/29 (4 overs)

Western Storm won by 6 wickets
County Ground, Taunton
Umpires: Ben Peverall and Sophie McLelland

- North West Thunder won the toss and elected to bat.
- Points: Western Storm 4, North West Thunder 0

25 May 2023
16:30 BST
Scorecard

North West Thunder; 117/6 (20 overs)	v	The Blaze; 120/7 (15.2 overs)
Liberty Heap 26 (32); Grace Ballinger 2/23 (4 overs)		Tammy Beaumont 38 (21); Sophie Ecclestone 2/18 (4 overs)

The Blaze won by 3 wickets
Old Trafford Cricket Ground, Manchester
Umpires: Naeem Ashraf and Waseem Mohammed

- The Blaze won the toss and elected to field.
- Points: The Blaze 5, North West Thunder 0

27 May 2023
14:30 BST
Scorecard

Sunrisers; 116/8 (20 overs)	v	North West Thunder; 119/3 (16.3 overs)
Cordelia Griffith 36 (35); Kate Cross 2/20 (4 overs)		Liberty Heap 46 (49); Mady Villiers 1/12 (2 overs)

North West Thunder won by 7 wickets
Old Trafford Cricket Ground, Manchester
Umpires: Anthony Harris and Naeem Ashraf

- Sunrisers won the toss and elected to bat.
- Points: North West Thunder 4, Sunrisers 0

29 May 2023
10:30 BST
Scorecard

North West Thunder; 155/6 (20 overs)	v	Central Sparks; 119/9 (20 overs)
Emma Lamb 64 (49); Bethan Ellis 2/22 (4 overs)		Erin Burns 41 (23); Fi Morris 2/16 (4 overs)

North West Thunder won by 36 runs
New Road, Worcester
Umpires: Jack Shantry and Rose Dovey

- Central Sparks won the toss and elected to field.
- Points: North West Thunder 5, Central Sparks 0

31 May 2023
15:00 BST
Scorecard

North West Thunder; 111 (18.5 overs)	v	Southern Vipers; 115/6 (16.1 overs)
Deandra Dottin 24 (28); Linsey Smith 2/16 (4 overs)		Ella McCaughan 42 (37); Olivia Bell 2/29 (3.1 overs)

Southern Vipers won by 4 wickets
Rose Bowl, Southampton
Umpires: Fiona Richards and James Tredwell

- North West Thunder won the toss and elected to bat.
- Points: Southern Vipers 4, North West Thunder 0

4 June 2023
14:30 BST
Scorecard

North West Thunder; 165/5 (20 overs)	v	South East Stars; 149 (19.2 overs)
Emma Lamb 63 (38); Danielle Gregory 2/14 (3 overs)		Bryony Smith 51 (32); Tara Norris 2/2 (1.2 overs)

North West Thunder won by 16 runs
Stanley Park, Blackpool
Umpires: Naeem Ashraf and Neil Pratt

- North West Thunder won the toss and elected to bat.
- Points: North West Thunder 4, South East Stars 0

7 June 2023
11:00 BST
Scorecard

Northern Diamonds; 96 (18.4 overs)	v	North West Thunder; 97/3 (15 overs)
Sterre Kalis 24 (28); Olivia Bell 3/9 (3 overs)		Fi Morris 42* (34); Katherine Fraser 1/14 (3 overs)

North West Thunder won by 7 wickets
Stanley Park, Blackpool
Umpires: Naeem Ashraf and Jasmine Naeem

- Northern Diamonds won the toss and elected to bat.
- Points: North West Thunder 5, Northern Diamonds 0

==== Semi-final ====
10 June 2023
12:00 BST
Scorecard

Southern Vipers; 191/6 (20 overs)	v	North West Thunder; 173/8 (20 overs)
Danni Wyatt 76 (50); Olivia Bell 4/37 (4 overs)		Fi Morris 36 (25); Georgia Adams 2/26 (3 overs)

Southern Vipers won by 18 runs
New Road, Worcester
Umpires: Rose Dovery and Sue Redfern
Player of the match: Danni Wyatt (Southern Vipers)

- North West Thunder won the toss and elected to field.

=== Tournament statistics ===
==== Batting ====
Player	Matches	Innings	Runs	Average	High score	100s	50s
Fi Morris	8	8	209	29.85	44	0	0
Emma Lamb	6	6	200	33.33	64	0	2
Liberty Heap	8	8	162	20.25	46	0	0
Deandra Dottin	8	8	128	18.28	26*	0	0

Source: ESPN Cricinfo Qualification: 100 runs.

==== Bowling ====
Player	Matches	Overs	Wickets	Average	Economy	BBI	5wi
Olivia Bell	4	12.1	11	8.27	7.47	4/37	0
Tara Norris	8	22.4	9	18.22	7.23	2/2	0
Fi Morris	8	25.0	7	23.42	6.56	2/16	0
Sophie Ecclestone	4	16.0	6	18.50	6.93	2/18	0
Kate Cross	3	12.0	5	14.60	6.08	2/20	0
Naomi Dattani	8	20.0	5	22.00	5.50	2/25	0
Mahika Gaur	8	26.0	5	42.00	8.07	2/27	0

Source: ESPN Cricinfo Qualification: 5 wickets.

== Season statistics ==
=== Batting ===
Player	Rachael Heyhoe Flint Trophy								Charlotte Edwards Cup							
Player	Matches	Innings	Runs	High score	Average	Strike rate	100s	50s	Matches	Innings	Runs	High score	Average	Strike rate	100s	50s
Olivia Bell	4	2	23	15	11.50	53.48	0	0	4	1	0	0	0.00	0.00	0	0
Stephanie Butler	–	–	–	–	–	–	–	–	2	1	2	2	2.00	50.00	0	0
Danielle Collins	7	5	97	25	24.25	59.87	0	0	8	5	38	15*	38.00	92.68	0	0
Kate Cross	3	2	2	2	1.00	28.57	0	0	3	1	22	22*	–	146.66	0	0
Naomi Dattani	10	10	263	82	26.30	58.83	0	0	8	7	81	30*	20.25	93.10	0	0
Laura Delany	4	4	52	23*	26.00	75.36	0	0	–	–	–	–	–	–	–	–
Deandra Dottin	7	6	196	54*	39.20	84.48	0	2	8	8	128	26*	18.28	120.75	0	0
Sophie Ecclestone	2	1	74	74	74.00	113.84	0	1	4	3	58	33	19.33	138.09	0	0
Mahika Gaur	6	4	30	10	10.00	56.60	0	0	8	2	4	3*	4.00	100.00	0	0
Phoebe Graham	5	2	16	16	8.00	35.55	0	0	–	–	–	–	–	–	–	–
Alex Hartley	3	3	5	5	2.50	33.33	0	0	1	–	–	–	–	–	–	–
Liberty Heap	10	8	74	23	9.25	82.22	0	0	8	8	162	46	20.25	89.50	0	0
Laura Jackson	4	1	5	5	5.00	50.00	0	0	–	–	–	–	–	–	–	–
Hannah Jones	3	2	13	11*	13.00	68.42	0	0	–	–	–	–	–	–	–	–
Emma Lamb	7	7	250	74	41.66	79.36	0	3	6	6	200	64	33.33	140.84	0	2
Fi Morris	11	11	155	52	14.09	72.42	0	0	8	8	209	44	29.85	122.22	0	0
Sophie Morris	1	1	2	2*	–	33.33	0	0	1	–	–	–	–	–	–	–
Daisy Mullan	3	2	26	26	13.00	57.77	0	0	–	–	–	–	–	–	–	–
Tara Norris	10	7	133	51*	26.60	91.09	0	1	8	3	3	2	3.00	42.85	0	0
Seren Smale	8	8	179	94	22.37	72.17	0	1	3	2	16	15	8.00	84.21	0	0
Olivia Thomas	2	2	9	5*	9.00	60.00	0	0	–	–	–	–	–	–	–	–
Eleanor Threlkeld	11	11	287	107*	41.00	74.16	1	1	8	8	85	31	14.16	92.39	0	0
Source: ESPN Cricinfo

=== Bowling ===
Player	Rachael Heyhoe Flint Trophy							Charlotte Edwards Cup						
Player	Matches	Overs	Wickets	Average	Economy	BBI	5wi	Matches	Overs	Wickets	Average	Economy	BBI	5wi
Olivia Bell	4	37.4	14	9.28	3.45	4/23	0	4	12.1	11	8.27	7.47	4/37	0
Stephanie Butler	–	–	–	–	–	–	–	2	1.0	0	–	13.00	–	0
Danielle Collins	7	3.0	0	–	6.66	–	0	–	–	–	–	–	–	–
Kate Cross	3	19.0	3	28.33	4.47	3/40	0	3	12.0	5	14.60	6.08	2/20	0
Naomi Dattani	10	56.0	9	32.11	5.16	4/16	0	8	20.0	5	22.00	5.50	2/25	0
Laura Delany	4	6.0	1	33.00	5.50	1/12	0	–	–	–	–	–	–	–
Deandra Dottin	7	13.0	1	95.00	7.30	1/58	0	8	1.0	0	–	11.00	–	0
Sophie Ecclestone	2	9.0	2	16.50	3.66	2/33	0	4	16.0	6	18.50	6.93	2/18	0
Mahika Gaur	6	37.0	6	29.16	4.72	3/39	0	8	26.0	5	42.00	8.07	2/27	0
Phoebe Graham	5	22.0	3	33.00	4.50	2/20	0	–	–	–	–	–	–	–
Alex Hartley	3	15.0	2	46.50	6.20	1/22	0	1	1.0	0	–	9.00	–	0
Liberty Heap	10	18.0	6	13.50	4.50	3/39	0	–	–	–	–	–	–	–
Laura Jackson	4	20.0	5	20.20	5.05	2/37	0	–	–	–	–	–	–	–
Hannah Jones	3	25.0	4	20.25	3.24	2/34	0	–	–	–	–	–	–	–
Emma Lamb	7	24.0	2	72.00	6.00	2/35	0	6	10.0	4	18.50	7.40	2/17	0
Fi Morris	11	80.0	8	43.75	4.37	3/33	0	8	25.0	7	23.42	6.56	2/16	0
Sophie Morris	1	7.0	0	–	3.71	–	0	1	2.0	0	–	7.00	–	0
Tara Norris	10	68.0	10	35.40	5.20	4/42	0	8	22.4	9	18.22	7.23	2/2	0
Olivia Thomas	2	3.0	1	28.00	9.33	1/28	0	–	–	–	–	–	–	–
Source: ESPN Cricinfo

=== Fielding ===
Player	Rachael Heyhoe Flint Trophy			Charlotte Edwards Cup		
Player	Matches	Innings	Catches	Matches	Innings	Catches
Olivia Bell	4	4	2	4	4	1
Stephanie Butler	–	–	–	2	2	0
Danielle Collins	7	7	1	8	8	2
Kate Cross	3	2	1	3	3	1
Naomi Dattani	10	10	5	8	8	5
Laura Delany	4	4	1	–	–	–
Deandra Dottin	7	6	2	8	8	6
Sophie Ecclestone	2	1	1	4	4	0
Mahika Gaur	6	5	1	8	8	0
Phoebe Graham	5	4	1	–	–	–
Alex Hartley	3	3	0	1	1	0
Liberty Heap	10	9	1	8	8	2
Laura Jackson	4	3	0	–	–	–
Hannah Jones	3	3	0	–	–	–
Emma Lamb	7	6	1	6	6	1
Fi Morris	11	10	7	8	8	4
Sophie Morris	1	1	0	1	1	0
Daisy Mullan	3	3	0	–	–	–
Tara Norris	10	10	5	8	8	4
Seren Smale	8	7	2	3	3	1
Olivia Thomas	2	2	1	–	–	–
Source: ESPN Cricinfo

=== Wicket-keeping ===
Player	Rachael Heyhoe Flint Trophy				Charlotte Edwards Cup			
Player	Matches	Innings	Catches	Stumpings	Matches	Innings	Catches	Stumpings
Eleanor Threlkeld	11	10	5	4	8	8	4	2
Source: ESPN Cricinfo
