= 2024 North West Thunder season =

English cricket season

North West Thunder
2024 season
- Coach: Chris Read
- Captain: Eleanor Threlkeld
- Overseas player: (Australia) Katie Mack (Australia) Georgia Voll
- RHFT: 6th
- CEC: 5th
- Most runs: RHFT: Seren Smale (515); CEC: Emma Lamb (228)
- Most wickets: RHFT: Hannah Jones (22); CEC: Fi Morris (9)
- Most catches: RHFT: Naomi Dattani (6) & Tara Norris (6); CEC: Fi Morris (6)
- Most wicket-keeping dismissals: RHFT: Eleanor Threlkeld (9); CEC: Eleanor Threlkeld (4)

The 2024 season was North West Thunder's fifth season, in which they competed in the 50 over Rachael Heyhoe Flint Trophy and the Twenty20 Charlotte Edwards Cup. In the Charlotte Edwards Cup, the side won three of their ten matches, finishing fifth in the group. In the Rachael Heyhoe Flint Trophy, the side finished sixth in the group, winning five of their fourteen matches.

The side was captained by Eleanor Threlkeld and coached by Chris Read. They played seven home matches at Old Trafford Cricket Ground, two at Stanley Park, Blackpool and one apiece at Rookwood Cricket Ground, Sale, Trafalgar Road Ground, Southport and Sedbergh School.

This was North West Thunder's final season in existence, effectively being replaced by a professionalised Lancashire team under the England and Wales Cricket Board's changes to the structure of women's domestic cricket from 2025 onwards.

== Squad ==
=== Departures ===
On 21 November 2023, it was announced Sophia Turner had left the side, joining Northern Diamonds. Turner had previously been on loan to Diamonds in September 2023. On 19 April 2024, it was announced that Daisy Mullan had gone on loan to The Blaze for the opening six rounds of the 2024 Rachael Heyhoe Flint Trophy. On 3 September 2024, it was announced that Naomi Dattani had been loaned to Southern Vipers for the remainder of the season.

=== Arrivals ===
At the start of the season, it was confirmed that Stephanie Butler, Laura Marshall and Olivia Thomas had not been retained in the squad compared to the previous season. On 6 March 2024, it was announced that Ailsa Lister had joined the side, signing a professional contract. On 11 April 2024, it was announced that the side had signed Katie Mack and Georgia Voll as overseas players for the season, with Mack available during April, May, August and September, and Voll available in May, June and July. On 30 April 2024, Grace Johnson was included in a matchday squad for the first time. On 25 August 2024, it was announced that the side had signed Darcey Carter on loan from South East Stars. On 31 August 2024, it was announced that the side had signed Evelyn Jones on loan from Central Sparks for the remainder of the season.

=== Personnel and contract changes ===
On 24 November 2023, it was announced that Chris Read would be the side's new Head Coach, replacing Paul Shaw, who stepped down at the end of the previous season. On 6 March 2024, it was announced that Hannah Rainey had signed a professional contract with the side. On 23 April 2024, it was announced that Danielle Collins and Olivia Bell had signed their first professional contracts with the side.

=== Squad list ===
- Age given is at the start of North West Thunder's first match of the season (20 April 2024).

Name	Nationality	Birth date	Batting Style	Bowling Style	Notes
Batters
Danielle Collins	England	7 July 2000 (aged 23)	Left-handed	Right-arm medium	
Evelyn Jones	England	8 August 1992 (aged 31)	Left-handed	Left-arm medium	Loaned from Central Sparks in September 2024
Katie Mack	Australia	14 September 1993 (aged 30)	Right-handed	Right-arm leg break	Overseas player; April to May, August to September 2024
Daisy Mullan	England	29 November 2002 (aged 21)	Right-handed	Right-arm medium	Loaned to The Blaze from April to May 2024
Shachi Pai	England	10 October 1998 (aged 25)	Right-handed	Right-arm medium	
Georgia Voll	Australia	5 August 2003 (aged 20)	Right-handed	Right-arm off break	Overseas player; May to July 2024
All-rounders
Naomi Dattani	England	28 April 1994 (aged 29)	Right-handed	Right-arm medium	Loaned to Southern Vipers in September 2024
Liberty Heap	England	16 September 2003 (aged 20)	Right-handed	Right-arm off break	
Emma Lamb	England	16 December 1997 (aged 26)	Right-handed	Right-arm off break	
Fi Morris	England	31 January 1994 (aged 30)	Right-handed	Right-arm off break	
Wicket-keepers
Alice Clarke	England	4 August 2001 (aged 22)	Left-handed	Right-arm medium	
Ailsa Lister	Scotland	8 April 2004 (aged 20)	Right-handed	—	
Seren Smale	England	13 December 2004 (aged 19)	Right-handed	—	
Eleanor Threlkeld	England	16 November 1998 (aged 25)	Right-handed	—	Captain
Bowlers
Olivia Bell	Scotland	12 November 2003 (aged 20)	Right-handed	Right-arm off break	
Darcey Carter	Scotland	31 May 2005 (aged 18)	Right-handed	Right-arm off break	Loaned from South East Stars from August to September 2024
Kate Cross	England	3 October 1991 (aged 32)	Right-handed	Right-arm medium-fast	
Sophie Ecclestone	England	6 May 1999 (aged 24)	Right-handed	Slow left-arm orthodox	
Mahika Gaur	England (Note: Gaur has also played international cricket for the United Arab Emirates.)	9 March 2006 (aged 18)	Right-handed	Left-arm medium	
Phoebe Graham	England	23 October 1991 (aged 32)	Right-handed	Right-arm medium	
Laura Jackson	England	27 December 1997 (aged 26)	Right-handed	Right-arm medium	
Grace Johnson	England	21 December 2004 (aged 19)	Right-handed	Right-arm medium	Joined April 2024
Hannah Jones	England	10 February 1999 (aged 25)	Left-handed	Slow left-arm orthodox	
Sophie Morris	England	2 January 2004 (aged 20)	Right-handed	Slow left-arm orthodox	
Tara Norris	United States	4 June 1998 (aged 25)	Left-handed	Left-arm medium	
Hannah Rainey	Scotland	2 June 1997 (aged 26)	Right-handed	Right-arm medium	

== Rachael Heyhoe Flint Trophy ==
=== Season standings ===
Pos	Team	Pld	W	L	T	NR	BP	Pts	NRR
1	Northern Diamonds (Q)	14	9	4	0	1	3	41	0.097
2	South East Stars (Q)	14	9	5	0	0	4	40	0.246
3	Southern Vipers (Q)	14	7	6	0	1	4	34	0.534
4	Sunrisers (Q)	14	7	6	0	1	4	34	−0.122
5	The Blaze	14	7	6	0	1	1	31	−0.176
6	North West Thunder	14	5	8	0	1	3	25	−0.013
7	Central Sparks	14	5	8	0	1	3	25	−0.299
8	Western Storm	14	4	10	0	0	2	18	−0.211

Source: ESPNCricinfo

advanced to the Semi-finals

=== Fixtures ===
20 April 2024
10:30
Scorecard

North West Thunder; 165 (43.1 overs)	v	Northern Diamonds; 166/1 (34.3 overs)
Seren Smale 32 (49); Katie Levick 4/38 (9.1 overs)		Lauren Winfield-Hill 69* (92); Hannah Jones 1/34 (7.3 overs)

Northern Diamonds won by 9 wickets
Riverside Ground, Chester-le-Street
Umpires: Jasmine Naeem and Simon Widdup

- Northern Diamonds won the toss and elected to bowl.
- Points: Northern Diamonds 5, North West Thunder 0

24 April 2024
10:30
Scorecard

North West Thunder; 292/5 (50 overs)	v	Sunrisers; 150 (40.1 overs)
Katie Mack 100 (110); Kate Coppack 2/32 (7 overs)		Jodi Grewcock 38 (47); Kate Cross 3/21 (8.1 overs)

North West Thunder won by 142 runs
Old Trafford Cricket Ground, Manchester
Umpires: Amy Clark and Simon Widdup

- Sunrisers won the toss and elected to bowl.
- Points: North West Thunder 5, Sunrisers 0

27 April 2024
10:30
Scorecard

Western Storm; 252/6 (50 overs)	v	North West Thunder; 186 (42.4 overs)
Sophie Luff 76* (100); Sophie Ecclestone 3/16 (10 overs)		Emma Lamb 38 (53); Chloe Skelton 3/35 (8 overs)

Western Storm won by 66 runs
Old Trafford Cricket Ground, Manchester
Umpires: Grace Bambury and Paul Baldwin

- North West Thunder won the toss and elected to bowl.
- Points: Western Storm 5, North West Thunder 0

1 May 2024
10:30
Scorecard

North West Thunder; 206/9 (50 overs)	v	Southern Vipers; 208/7 (43.3 overs)
Seren Smale 99 (145); Linsey Smith 3/19 (10 overs)		Georgia Adams 51 (65); Tara Norris 3/45 (10 overs)

Southern Vipers won by 3 wickets
Sir Paul Getty's Ground, Wormsley
Umpires: Ben Peverall and Julia Jarvis

- Southern Vipers won the toss and elected to bowl.
- Points: Southern Vipers 4, North West Thunder 0

6 May 2024
10:30
Scorecard

The Blaze; 174 (46.4 overs)	v	North West Thunder; 176/9 (44.4 overs)
Kirstie Gordon 43 (82); Mahika Gaur 3/33 (7 overs)		Seren Smale 58 (70); Kirstie Gordon 3/25 (10 overs)

North West Thunder won by 1 wicket
Trent Bridge, Nottingham
Umpires: Chris Watts and Rose Dovey

- North West Thunder won the toss and elected to bowl.
- Points: North West Thunder 4, The Blaze 0

8 May 2024
10:30
Scorecard

North West Thunder; 284/7 (50 overs)	v	Central Sparks; 287/7 (49.4 overs)
Emma Lamb 107 (104); Grace Potts 2/46 (9 overs)		Evelyn Jones 136* (148); Kate Cross 2/50 (9.4 overs)

Central Sparks won by 3 wickets
Old Trafford Cricket Ground, Manchester
Umpires: Amy Clark and Naeem Ashraf

- North West Thunder won the toss and elected to bat.
- Points: Central Sparks 4, North West Thunder 0

30 June 2024
10:30
Scorecard

Sunrisers; 253 (47.3 overs)	v	North West Thunder; 224 (45.2 overs)
Jo Gardner 63 (78); Hannah Jones 4/50 (10 overs)		Emma Lamb 48 (42); Sophie Munro 5/25 (6.2 overs)

Sunrisers won by 30 runs (DLS)
County Ground, Chelmsford
Umpires: Julia Jarvis and Simon Widdup

- Sunrisers won the toss and elected to bat.
- Match reduced to 48 overs per side due to rain.
- North West Thunder target adjusted to 255 runs from 48 overs.
- Points: Sunrisers 4, North West Thunder 0

7 July 2024
10:30
Scorecard

South East Stars; 283 (49.4 overs)	v	North West Thunder; 201 (42.3 overs)
Bryony Smith 67 (71); Hannah Jones 3/56 (10 overs)		Fi Morris 37 (56); Ryana MacDonald-Gay 4/34 (7.3 overs)

South East Stars won by 82 runs
Stanley Park, Blackpool
Umpires: Hassan Adnan and Joanne Ibbotson

- South East Stars won the toss and elected to bat.
- Points: South East Stars 5, North West Thunder 0

10 July 2024
10:30
Scorecard

Central Sparks; 144 (42.4 overs)	v	North West Thunder; 147/2 (29 overs)
Evelyn Jones 38 (62); Tara Norris 4/18 (10 overs)		Emma Lamb 71* (85); Grace Potts 1/23 (6 overs)

North West Thunder won by 8 wickets
New Road, Worcester
Umpires: Grace Bambury and Simon Widdup

- North West Thunder won the toss and elected to bowl.
- Points: North West Thunder 5, Central Sparks 0

14 July 2024
10:30
Scorecard

North West Thunder	v	Southern Vipers

Match Abandoned
Sedbergh School, Sedbergh

- No toss.
- No play possible due to rain.
- Points: North West Thunder 2, Southern Vipers 2

26 August 2024
10:30
Scorecard

North West Thunder; 250/8 (50 overs)	v	South East Stars; 130 (36.4 overs)
Seren Smale 76 (87); Ryana MacDonald-Gay 3/42 (10 overs)		Kira Chathli 54 (74); Kate Cross 6/40 (8.4 overs)

North West Thunder won by 120 runs
County Ground, Beckenham
Umpires: Julia Jarvis and Neil Bainton

- North West Thunder won the toss and elected to bat.
- Points: North West Thunder 5, South East Stars 0

1 September 2024
10:30
Scorecard

Northern Diamonds; 290/6 (50 overs)	v	North West Thunder; 204 (38 overs)
Sterre Kalis 100 (95); Hannah Jones 2/37 (10 overs)		Evelyn Jones 57 (76); Phoebe Turner 6/20 (9 overs)

Northern Diamonds won by 86 runs
Trafalgar Road Ground, Southport
Umpires: Jasmine Naeem and Naeem Ashraf

- North West Thunder won the toss and elected to bowl.
- Points: Northern Diamonds 5, North West Thunder 0

4 September 2024
10:30
Scorecard

The Blaze; 197 (47 overs)	v	North West Thunder; 173 (45.4 overs)
Sarah Bryce 34 (37); Fi Morris 6/35 (9 overs)		Tara Norris 53* (56); Grace Ballinger 4/23 (9 overs)

The Blaze won by 24 runs
Rookwood Cricket Ground, Sale
Umpires: Anthony Harris and Naeem Ashraf

- North West Thunder won the toss and elected to field.
- Points: The Blaze 4, North West Thunder 0

7 September 2024
10:30
Scorecard

North West Thunder; 216/9 (50 overs)	v	Western Storm; 69/2 (20 overs)
Eleanor Threlkeld 69* (93); Mollie Robbins 3/28 (10 overs)		Sophie Luff 16* (39); Grace Johnson 1/14 (4 overs)

North West Thunder won by 2 runs (DLS)
County Ground, Taunton
Umpires: Fiona Richards and Mark Newell

- North West Thunder won the toss and elected to bat.
- Western Storm innings curtailed at 20 overs due to rain; target was 72.
- Points: North West Thunder 4, Western Storm 0

=== Tournament statistics ===
==== Batting ====
Player	Matches	Innings	Runs	Average	High score	100s	50s
Seren Smale	13	13	515	39.61	99	0	4
Emma Lamb	10	10	356	39.55	107	1	1
Katie Mack	9	9	324	40.50	100	1	1
Fi Morris	13	12	275	22.91	89	0	2
Eleanor Threlkeld	13	12	249	24.90	69*	0	1

Source: ESPN Cricinfo Qualification: 200 runs.

==== Bowling ====
Player	Matches	Overs	Wickets	Average	Economy	BBI	5wi
Hannah Jones	13	102.3	22	20.90	4.48	4/50	0
Fi Morris	13	80.4	16	25.93	5.14	6/35	1
Kate Cross	6	50.1	12	19.00	4.54	6/40	1

Source: ESPN Cricinfo Qualification: 10 wickets.

== Charlotte Edwards Cup ==
=== Season standings ===
Pos	Team	Pld	W	L	T	NR	BP	Pts	NRR
1	The Blaze (Q)	10	9	1	0	0	3	39	0.606
2	South East Stars (Q)	10	7	2	0	1	4	34	0.309
3	Southern Vipers (Q)	10	6	4	0	0	2	26	1.001
4	Central Sparks (Q)	10	6	4	0	0	2	26	0.402
5	North West Thunder	10	3	6	0	1	1	15	−0.727
6	Northern Diamonds	10	3	7	0	0	1	13	−0.067
7	Western Storm	10	2	6	0	2	1	13	−0.659
8	Sunrisers	10	2	8	0	0	0	8	−1.073

Source: ESPNCricinfo

advanced to the Semi-finals

=== Fixtures ===
19 May 2024
13:00
Scorecard

Northern Diamonds; 109/5 (20 overs)	v	North West Thunder; 112/2 (14.5 overs)
Emma Marlow 47* (53); Mahika Gaur 1/11 (4 overs)		Emma Lamb 44* (43); Katie Levick 1/33 (4 overs)

North West Thunder won by 8 wickets
Old Trafford Cricket Ground, Manchester
Umpires: Amy Clark and Paul Pollard

- Northern Diamonds won the toss and elected to bat.
- Points: North West Thunder 5, Northern Diamonds 0

24 May 2024
14:30
Scorecard

North West Thunder; 139/7 (20 overs)	v	South East Stars; 140/5 (16 overs)
Fi Morris 41 (27); Tash Farrant 2/17 (4 overs)		Paige Scholfield 73* (39); Tara Norris 1/13 (3 overs)

South East Stars won by 5 wickets
County Ground, Beckenham
Umpires: Ben Peverall and Rose Dovey

- South East Stars won the toss and elected to bowl.
- Points: South East Stars 5, North West Thunder 0

26 May 2024
14:30
Scorecard

North West Thunder; 151/6 (20 overs)	v	The Blaze; 152/5 (18.5 overs)
Emma Lamb 63* (50); Grace Ballinger 2/25 (4 overs)		Kathryn Bryce 61 (51); Mahika Gaur 3/39 (4 overs)

The Blaze won by 5 wickets
Haslegrave Ground, Loughborough
Umpires: Joanne Ibbotson and Neil Mallender

- The Blaze won the toss and elected to bowl.
- Points: The Blaze 4, North West Thunder 0

30 May 2024
13:30
Scorecard

Central Sparks; 121/8 (20 overs)	v	North West Thunder; 125/7 (19 overs)
Emily Arlott 28 (22); Phoebe Graham 3/16 (4 overs)		Fi Morris 43 (38); Georgia Davis 2/19 (3 overs)

North West Thunder won by 3 wickets
Old Trafford Cricket Ground, Manchester
Umpires: Joanne Ibbotson and Simon Widdup

- North West Thunder won the toss and elected to bat.
- Points: North West Thunder 4, Central Sparks 0

2 June 2024
16:00
Scorecard

North West Thunder; 111/9 (20 overs)	v	The Blaze; 112/3 (15.4 overs)
Danielle Collins 30 (32); Kirstie Gordon 5/12 (4 overs)		Tammy Beaumont 34* (45); Kate Cross 1/16 (2.4 overs)

The Blaze won by 7 wickets
Old Trafford Cricket Ground, Manchester
Umpires: Gabi Brown and Naeem Ashraf

- North West Thunder won the toss and elected to bat.
- Points: The Blaze 5, North West Thunder 0

7 June 2024
14:30
Scorecard

North West Thunder; 85 (19.5 overs)	v	Southern Vipers; 86/3 (10.5 overs)
Tara Norris 13* (21); Linsey Smith 3/9 (4 overs)		Charli Knott 45 (28); Sophie Ecclestone 2/23 (4 overs)

Southern Vipers won by 7 wickets
Old Trafford Cricket Ground, Manchester
Umpires: Amy Clark and Hassan Adnan

- Southern Vipers won the toss and elected to bowl.
- Points: Southern Vipers 5, North West Thunder 0

9 June 2024
13:00
Scorecard

Sunrisers; 151/9 (20 overs)	v	North West Thunder; 155/5 (19.3 overs)
Alice Macleod 60 (43); Sophie Ecclestone 3/18 (4 overs)		Seren Smale 39* (33); Eva Gray 2/28 (4 overs)

North West Thunder won by 5 wickets
Stanley Park, Blackpool
Umpires: Jasmine Naeem and Peter Hartley

- Sunrisers won the toss and elected to bat.
- Points: North West Thunder 4, Sunrisers 0

13 June 2024
14:30
Scorecard

Western Storm	v	North West Thunder

Match Abandoned
Sophia Gardens, Cardiff

- No toss.
- No play possible due to rain.
- Points: Western Storm 2, North West Thunder 2

14 June 2024
15:00
Scorecard

North West Thunder; 146/6 (20 overs)	v	Central Sparks; 150/2 (20 overs)
Seren Smale 88* (61); Grace Potts 2/18 (4 overs)		Abigail Freeborn 71* (57); Kate Cross 1/19 (4 overs)

Central Sparks won by 8 wickets
Edgbaston Cricket Ground, Birmingham
Umpires: Gabi Brown and Hassan Adnan

- Central Sparks won the toss and elected to bowl.
- Points: Central Sparks 4, North West Thunder 0

19 June 2024
11:30
Scorecard

North West Thunder; 61 (14.2 overs)	v	Northern Diamonds; 62/5 (13.4 overs)
Tara Norris 13 (12); Rachel Slater 3/12 (4 overs)		Rebecca Duckworth 21* (27); Sophie Morris 2/13 (4 overs)

Northern Diamonds won by 5 wickets
Riverside Ground, Chester-le-Street
Umpires: Jasmine Naeem and Neil Pratt

- Northern Diamonds won the toss and elected to bowl.
- Points: Northern Diamonds 5, North West Thunder 0

=== Tournament statistics ===
==== Batting ====
Player	Matches	Innings	Runs	Average	High score	100s	50s
Emma Lamb	9	9	228	32.57	63*	0	1
Seren Smale	9	9	207	34.50	88*	0	1

Source: ESPN Cricinfo Qualification: 150 runs.

==== Bowling ====
Player	Matches	Overs	Wickets	Average	Economy	BBI	5wi
Fi Morris	9	29.0	9	16.55	5.13	3/22	0
Kate Cross	6	21.3	7	17.14	5.58	2/14	0
Sophie Ecclestone	4	16.0	6	16.83	6.31	3/18	0
Phoebe Graham	9	25.4	6	35.66	8.33	3/16	0

Source: ESPN Cricinfo Qualification: 5 wickets.

== Season statistics ==
=== Batting ===
Player	Rachael Heyhoe Flint Trophy								Charlotte Edwards Cup							
Player	Matches	Innings	Runs	High score	Average	Strike rate	100s	50s	Matches	Innings	Runs	High score	Average	Strike rate	100s	50s
Olivia Bell	1	1	4	4*	–	80.00	0	0	–	–	–	–	–	–	–	–
Darcey Carter	2	2	12	11	6.00	48.00	0	0	–	–	–	–	–	–	–	–
Alice Clarke	5	5	87	41	17.40	50.28	0	0	–	–	–	–	–	–	–	–
Danielle Collins	8	8	58	23	7.25	60.41	0	0	8	5	59	30	11.80	84.28	0	0
Kate Cross	6	5	67	36	16.75	68.36	0	0	6	5	49	17*	12.25	122.50	0	0
Naomi Dattani	11	10	128	36	14.22	68.44	0	0	–	–	–	–	–	–	–	–
Sophie Ecclestone	3	3	36	24	12.00	92.30	0	0	4	4	53	23	13.25	100.00	0	0
Mahika Gaur	4	3	11	11	3.66	33.33	0	0	2	–	–	–	–	–	–	–
Phoebe Graham	9	7	31	10	5.16	43.05	0	0	9	4	16	8*	8.00	80.00	0	0
Liberty Heap	–	–	–	–	–	–	–	–	5	3	30	12	30.00	71.42	0	0
Laura Jackson	–	–	–	–	–	–	–	–	1	–	–	–	–	–	–	–
Grace Johnson	2	2	50	27	25.00	64.10	0	0	1	1	1	1	1.00	14.28	0	0
Evelyn Jones	3	3	73	57	24.33	66.97	0	1	–	–	–	–	–	–	–	–
Hannah Jones	13	9	68	26*	17.00	56.66	0	0	4	–	–	–	–	–	–	–
Emma Lamb	10	10	356	107	39.55	84.36	1	1	9	9	228	63*	32.57	100.88	0	0
Ailsa Lister	–	–	–	–	–	–	–	–	5	4	75	44	18.75	117.18	0	0
Katie Mack	9	9	324	100	40.50	83.72	1	1	4	4	33	28	8.25	91.66	0	0
Fi Morris	13	12	275	89	22.91	84.09	0	2	9	9	132	43	14.66	120.00	0	0
Sophie Morris	6	4	2	2*	2.00	10.52	0	0	4	2	7	4	3.50	53.84	0	0
Daisy Mullan	–	–	–	–	–	–	–	–	1	1	2	2	2.00	50.00	0	0
Tara Norris	11	8	119	53*	19.83	72.12	0	1	8	6	43	13*	14.33	89.58	0	0
Shachi Pai	1	1	8	8	8.00	22.85	0	0	–	–	–	–	–	–	–	–
Seren Smale	13	13	515	99	39.61	71.92	0	4	9	9	207	88*	34.50	112.50	0	1
Eleanor Threlkeld	13	12	249	69*	24.90	62.87	0	1	9	8	59	20	7.37	73.75	0	0
Georgia Voll	–	–	–	–	–	–	–	–	1	1	19	19	19.00	146.15	0	0
Source: ESPN Cricinfo

=== Bowling ===
Player	Rachael Heyhoe Flint Trophy							Charlotte Edwards Cup						
Player	Matches	Overs	Wickets	Average	Economy	BBI	5wi	Matches	Overs	Wickets	Average	Economy	BBI	5wi
Olivia Bell	1	4.3	0	–	6.22	–	0	–	–	–	–	–	–	–
Darcey Carter	2	10.0	1	48.00	4.80	1/48	0	–	–	–	–	–	–	–
Danielle Collins	8	–	–	–	–	–	–	8	1.0	0	–	16.00	–	0
Kate Cross	6	50.1	12	19.00	4.54	6/40	1	6	21.3	7	17.14	5.58	2/14	0
Naomi Dattani	11	41.0	7	37.00	6.31	2/35	0	–	–	–	–	–	–	–
Sophie Ecclestone	3	30.0	7	12.14	2.83	3/16	0	4	16.0	6	16.83	6.31	3/18	0
Mahika Gaur	4	31.0	4	32.00	4.12	3/33	0	2	8.0	4	12.50	6.25	3/39	0
Phoebe Graham	9	66.3	7	45.42	4.78	2/56	0	9	25.4	6	35.66	8.33	3/16	0
Liberty Heap	–	–	–	–	–	–	–	5	1.0	0	–	17.00	–	0
Laura Jackson	–	–	–	–	–	–	–	1	2.0	0	–	13.50	–	0
Grace Johnson	2	12.0	1	40.00	3.33	1/14	0	1	2.0	0	–	5.50	–	0
Hannah Jones	13	102.3	22	20.90	4.48	4/50	0	4	12.5	1	107.00	8.33	1/26	0
Fi Morris	13	80.4	16	25.93	5.14	6/35	1	9	29.0	9	16.55	5.13	3/22	0
Sophie Morris	6	52.4	9	21.11	3.60	3/31	0	4	13.0	4	17.50	5.38	2/13	0
Tara Norris	11	77.0	9	38.11	4.45	4/18	0	8	22.0	4	41.25	7.50	2/30	0
Georgia Voll	–	–	–	–	–	–	–	1	1.0	0	–	8.00	–	0
Source: ESPN Cricinfo

=== Fielding ===
Player	Rachael Heyhoe Flint Trophy			Charlotte Edwards Cup		
Player	Matches	Innings	Catches	Matches	Innings	Catches
Olivia Bell	1	1	0	–	–	–
Darcey Carter	2	2	0	–	–	–
Alice Clarke	5	5	2	–	–	–
Danielle Collins	8	8	2	8	8	3
Kate Cross	6	6	4	6	6	1
Naomi Dattani	11	11	6	–	–	–
Sophie Ecclestone	3	3	4	4	4	0
Mahika Gaur	4	4	0	2	2	0
Phoebe Graham	9	9	2	9	9	0
Liberty Heap	–	–	–	5	5	1
Laura Jackson	–	–	–	1	1	1
Grace Johnson	2	2	0	1	1	1
Evelyn Jones	3	3	2	–	–	–
Hannah Jones	13	13	2	4	4	2
Emma Lamb	10	10	4	9	9	1
Ailsa Lister	–	–	–	5	5	2
Katie Mack	9	9	2	4	4	1
Fi Morris	13	13	3	9	9	6
Sophie Morris	6	6	0	4	4	1
Daisy Mullan	–	–	–	1	1	0
Tara Norris	11	11	6	8	8	2
Shachi Pai	1	1	0	–	–	–
Seren Smale	13	13	4	9	9	1
Georgia Voll	–	–	–	1	1	0
Source: ESPN Cricinfo

=== Wicket-keeping ===
Player	Rachael Heyhoe Flint Trophy				Charlotte Edwards Cup			
Player	Matches	Innings	Catches	Stumpings	Matches	Innings	Catches	Stumpings
Eleanor Threlkeld	13	13	6	3	9	9	1	3
Source: ESPN Cricinfo
