= List of North West Thunder cricketers =

This is an alphabetical list of cricketers who played for North West Thunder during their existence between 2020 and 2024. They first played in the Rachael Heyhoe Flint Trophy, a 50 over competition that began in 2020. In 2021, the Twenty20 Charlotte Edwards Cup was added to the women's domestic structure in England. At the end of the 2024 season, North West Thunder were effectively replaced by a professionalised Lancashire team.

Players' names are followed by the years in which they were active as a North West Thunder player. Seasons given are first and last seasons; the player did not necessarily play in all the intervening seasons. This list only includes players who appeared in at least one match for North West Thunder; players who were named in the team's squad for a season but did not play a match are not included.

== B ==
- Olivia Bell (2023–2024)
- Georgie Boyce (2020–2022)
- Natalie Brown (2020–2022)
- Stephanie Butler (2023)

== C ==
- Darcey Carter (2024)
- Alice Clarke (2020–2024)
- Piepa Cleary (2021)
- Danielle Collins (2020–2024)
- Kate Cross (2020–2024)

== D ==
- Naomi Dattani (2023–2024)
- Laura Delany (2023)
- Deandra Dottin (2022–2023)
- Rebecca Duckworth (2020–2022)
- Alice Dyson (2020–2021)

== E ==
- Sophie Ecclestone (2020–2024)

== G ==
- Mahika Gaur (2023–2024)
- Phoebe Graham (2022–2024)

== H ==
- Alex Hartley (2020–2023)
- Liberty Heap (2020–2024)

== J ==
- Laura Jackson (2020–2024)
- Grace Johnson (2024)
- Evelyn Jones (2024)
- Hannah Jones (2020–2024)

== L ==
- Emma Lamb (2020–2024)
- Ailsa Lister (2024)

== M ==
- Katie Mack (2024)
- Laura Marshall (2020–2022)
- Fi Morris (2023–2024)
- Sophie Morris (2023–2024)
- Daisy Mullan (2021–2024)

== N ==
- Tara Norris (2023–2024)

== P ==
- Shachi Pai (2022–2024)

== S ==
- Seren Smale (2021–2024)

== T ==
- Olivia Thomas (2020–2023)
- Eleanor Threlkeld (2020–2024)
- Sophia Turner (2020–2022)

== V ==
- Georgia Voll (2024)

== Captains ==
No.	Name	Nationality	Years	First	Last	LA	T20	Total
1	Alex Hartley	England	2020–2021	29 August 2020	18 September 2021	13	5	18
2	Kate Cross	England	2021	9 July 2021	9 July 2021	0	1	1
3	Eleanor Threlkeld	England	2022–2024	14 May 2022	7 September 2024	30	23	53

== See also ==
- List of Lancashire Thunder cricketers
