= List of England women Twenty20 International cricketers =

This is a list of English women Twenty20 International cricketers. A Twenty20 International is an international cricket match between two representative teams, each having Twenty20 International (T20I) status, as determined by the International Cricket Council (ICC). A T20I is played under the rules of Twenty20 cricket.

The list is arranged in the order in which each player won her first Twenty20 cap. Where more than one player won her first Twenty20 cap in the same match, those players are listed alphabetically by surname.

== Key ==
General

- ‡ – Captain
- † – Wicket-keeper
- First – Year of debut
- Last – Year of latest game
- Mat – Number of matches played

Batting

- Runs – Runs scored in career
- HS – Highest score
- Avg – Runs scored per dismissal
- 50s – Number of half centuries
- 100 – Centuries scored
- * – Batsman remained not out

Bowling

- Balls – Balls bowled in career
- Wkt – Wickets taken in career
- BBI – Best bowling in an innings
- Ave – Average runs per wicket

Fielding

- Ca – Catches taken
- St – Stumpings taken

== Players ==
Statistics are correct as of 5 July 2026.

England women's T20I cricketers
General					Batting					Bowling				Fielding		Ref
No.	Name	First	Last	Mat	Runs	HS	Avg	50s	100s	Balls	Wkt	BBI	Ave	Ca	St	Ref
1	Rosalie Birch	2004	2008	4	27	11	6.75	0	0	48	5	4/27	7.80	1	0	
2	Clare Connor ‡	2004	2005	2	15	9*	15.00	0	0	36	0	—	—	2	0	
3	Charlotte Edwards ‡	2004	2016	95	2605	92*	32.97	12	0	303	9	3/21	36.66	16	0	
4	Lydia Greenway	2004	2016	85	1192	80*	24.32	2	0	—	—	—	—	54	0	
5	Isa Guha	2004	2011	22	39	13*	7.80	0	0	459	18	3/21	25.05	4	0	
6	Jenny Gunn ‡	2004	2018	104	682	69	13.91	1	0	1385	75	5/18	19.82	56	0	
7	Laura Newton	2004	2006	3	32	24	10.66	0	0	24	0	—	—	2	0	
8	Lucy Pearson	2004	2004	1	—	—	—	—	—	24	1	1/23	23.00	0	0	
9	Nicky Shaw ‡	2004	2010	22	83	12*	11.85	0	0	456	19	3/17	22.78	5	0	
10	Jane Smit †	2004	2008	4	1	1*	—	0	0	—	—	—	—	3	1	
11	Claire Taylor †	2004	2011	27	615	76*	27.95	3	0	—	—	—	—	12	2	
12	Arran Brindle	2005	2014	35	373	42*	23.31	0	0	453	22	3/11	17.45	13	0	
13	Katherine Sciver-Brunt	2005	2023	112	590	42*	15.94	0	0	2353	114	4/15	19.19	35	0	
14	Beth Morgan	2005	2011	28	300	46*	15.00	0	0	82	5	2/8	20.80	8	0	
15	Lynsey Askew	2006	2008	6	1	1	1.00	0	0	126	6	2/13	6.00	0	0	
16	Caroline Atkins	2006	2011	19	56	20*	5.60	0	0	—	—	—	—	2	0	
17	Sarah Taylor †	2006	2019	90	2177	77	29.02	16	0	—	—	—	—	23	51	
18	Holly Colvin	2007	2013	50	91	18*	13.00	0	0	1121	63	4/9	15.41	19	0	
19	Laura Marsh	2007	2019	67	755	54	16.41	1	0	1497	64	3/12	20.64	7	0	
20	Charlie Russell	2007	2007	1	2	2*	—	0	0	24	0	—	—	0	0	
21	Ebony Rainford-Brent	2008	2010	7	53	23*	8.83	0	0	—	—	—	—	0	0	
22	Anya Shrubsole	2008	2020	78	104	29	11.55	0	0	1574	102	5/11	15.29	20	0	
23	Tammy Beaumont ‡†	2009	2025	109	1975	116	24.08	11	1	—	—	—	—	14	4	
24	Danielle Hazell	2009	2018	85	188	18*	8.95	0	0	1905	85	4/12	20.75	11	0	
25	Danni Wyatt-Hodge	2010	2026	187	3671	124	24.47	23	3	759	46	4/11	15.54	44	0	
26	Beth MacGregor	2010	2010	3	0	0*	—	0	0	54	1	1/28	42.00	1	0	
27	Susie Rowe	2010	2013	22	126	29*	21.00	0	0	—	—	—	—	4	0	
28	Fran Wilson	2010	2020	30	356	43*	22.25	0	0	—	—	—	—	7	0	
29	Heather Knight ‡	2010	2026	145	2656	108*	27.66	10	1	585	21	3/9	27.19	40	0	
30	Lauren Griffiths †	2011	2011	5	10	8	5.00	0	0	—	—	—	—	0	0	
31	Georgia Elwiss	2011	2019	14	29	18	9.66	0	0	163	8	2/9	20.12	3	0	
32	Natasha Farrant	2013	2021	18	7	3*	7.00	0	0	388	15	2/15	27.00	4	0	
33	Amy Jones ‡†	2013	2026	138	1859	89	20.20	7	0	—	—	—	—	59	44	
34	Nat Sciver-Brunt ‡	2013	2026	141	3187	82	30.64	20	0	1902	90	4/15	23.28	75	0	
35	Lauren Winfield-Hill †	2013	2020	44	596	74	20.55	3	0	—	—	—	—	17	1	
36	Kate Cross ‡	2013	2024	18	3	2	1.50	0	0	350	14	2/18	30.50	4	0	
37	Beth Langston	2013	2013	2	—	—	—	—	—	48	1	1/16	44.00	1	0	
38	Jodie Dibble	2014	2014	1	0	0	0.00	0	0	12	0	—	—	0	0	
39	Rebecca Grundy	2014	2016	12	4	2*	-	0	0	264	11	2/13	21.63	4	0	
40	Sophie Ecclestone	2016	2026	113	368	35	17.52	0	0	2517	154	4/18	16.44	38	0	
41	Alex Hartley	2016	2019	4	2	2*	—	0	0	70	3	2/19	26.33	0	0	
42	Alice Davidson-Richards	2018	2022	8	46	24	11.50	0	0	72	4	3/5	22.50	2	0	
43	Katie George	2018	2019	5	0	0	0.00	0	0	78	2	1/22	58.50	0	0	
44	Bryony Smith	2018	2024	10	143	58	17.87	1	0	60	2	1/10	30.00	2	0	
45	Sophia Dunkley	2018	2026	81	1463	81*	25.66	7	0	24	1	1/6	13.00	20	0	
46	Kirstie Gordon	2018	2018	5	1	1*	—	0	0	114	8	3/16	12.55	0	0	
47	Linsey Smith	2018	2026	34	1	1	1.00	0	0	774	35	3/18	24.51	5	0	
48	Freya Davies	2019	2023	26	1	1*	—	0	0	468	23	4/23	23.21	6	0	
49	Mady Villiers	2019	2024	19	52	13	17.33	0	0	254	17	3/10	16.58	9	0	
50	Sarah Glenn	2019	2025	73	134	26	16.75	0	0	1454	89	4/12	16.48	12	0	
51	Emma Lamb	2021	2021	1	0	0*	—	0	0	—	—	—	—	0	0	
52	Maia Bouchier	2021	2026	48	800	91	23.52	3	0	—	—	—	—	18	0	
53	Charlie Dean ‡	2022	2026	58	172	34	15.63	0	0	1219	77	4/19	18.32	14	0	
54	Issy Wong	2022	2026	20	45	13	9.00	0	0	395	15	2/10	31.46	3	0	
55	Alice Capsey	2022	2026	58	1053	82	21.93	6	0	156	6	2/4	31.50	20	0	
56	Freya Kemp	2022	2026	38	336	51*	28.00	1	0	474	30	4/22	20.46	7	0	
57	Lauren Bell	2022	2026	48	4	2	2.00	0	0	1046	67	4/12	18.86	9	0	
58	Danielle Gibson	2023	2026	35	212	41*	16.30	0	0	474	19	3/14	31.52	11	0	
59	Mahika Gaur (Note: Mahika Gaur also played WT20I matches for UAE. Only her record for England is given above.)	2023	2024	5	1	1	0.33	0	0	78	2	1/16	48.00	0	0	
60	Bess Heath	2023	2024	4	6	3	2.00	0	0	—	—	—	—	2	0	
61	Lauren Filer	2024	2025	12	8	4*	2.66	0	0	246	8	2/17	39.00	4	0	
62	Hollie Armitage	2024	2024	3	5	4	1.66	0	0	—	—	—	—	1	0	
63	Georgia Adams	2024	2024	2	39	23	19.50	0	0	30	0	—	—	2	0	
64	Charis Pavely	2024	2024	2	9	8	4.50	0	0	48	3	3/19	17.66	1	0	
65	Paige Scholfield	2024	2025	5	58	34	14.50	0	0	—	—	—	—	0	0	
66	Seren Smale †	2024	2024	2	35	25	17.50	0	0	—	—	—	—	0	0	
67	Ryana MacDonald-Gay	2024	2024	1	—	—	—	—	—	12	1	1/25	25.00	0	0	
68	Emily Arlott	2025	2025	6	26	12*	26.00	0	0	144	9	3/14	21.22	3	0	
69	Tilly Corteen-Coleman	2026	2026	1	—	—	—	—	—	18	1	1/19	19.00	0	0	
