= List of Lancashire Thunder cricketers =

This is an alphabetical list of cricketers who played for Lancashire Thunder during their existence between 2016 and 2019. They competed in the Women's Cricket Super League, a Twenty20 competition, during these years before being replaced by North West Thunder as part of a restructure of English women's domestic cricket.

Players' names are followed by the years in which they were active as a Lancashire Thunder player. Seasons given are first and last seasons; the player did not necessarily play in all the intervening seasons. This list only includes players who appeared in at least one match for Lancashire Thunder; players who were named in the team's squad for a season but did not play a match are not included.

== B ==
- Nicole Bolton (2018)
- Georgie Boyce (2018–2019)
- Natalie Brown (2016–2019)

== C ==
- Kate Cross (2016–2019)

== D ==
- Rachel Dickinson (2017)
- Deandra Dottin (2016)
- Sophia Dunkley (2019)
- Alice Dyson (2019)

== E ==
- Sophie Ecclestone (2016–2019)

== F ==
- Ria Fackrell (2019)

== H ==
- Alex Hartley (2018–2019)
- Danielle Hazell (2017–2018)

== J ==
- Jess Jonassen (2017)
- Evelyn Jones (2017–2019)

== K ==
- Harmanpreet Kaur (2018–2019)

== L ==
- Emma Lamb (2017–2019)
- Suné Luus (2019)

== M ==
- Tahlia McGrath (2019)
- Laura Marshall (2016)
- Hayley Matthews (2016)
- Natasha Miles (2016–2017)

== N ==
- Laura Newton (2016)

== P ==
- Nalisha Patel (2016)

== S ==
- Amy Satterthwaite (2016–2018)

== T ==
- Lea Tahuhu (2017)
- Sarah Taylor (2017)
- Eleanor Threlkeld (2016–2019)

== W ==
- Danni Wyatt (2016)

== Captains ==
No.	Name	Nationality	Years	First	Last	Total Matches
1	Amy Satterthwaite	New Zealand	2016	31 July 2016	12 August 2016	5
2	Danielle Hazell	England	2017–2018	11 August 2017	18 August 2018	15
3	Kate Cross	England	2019	6 August 2019	28 August 2019	10

== See also ==
- List of North West Thunder cricketers
