= Danielle Collins (cricketer) =

English cricketer (born 2000)

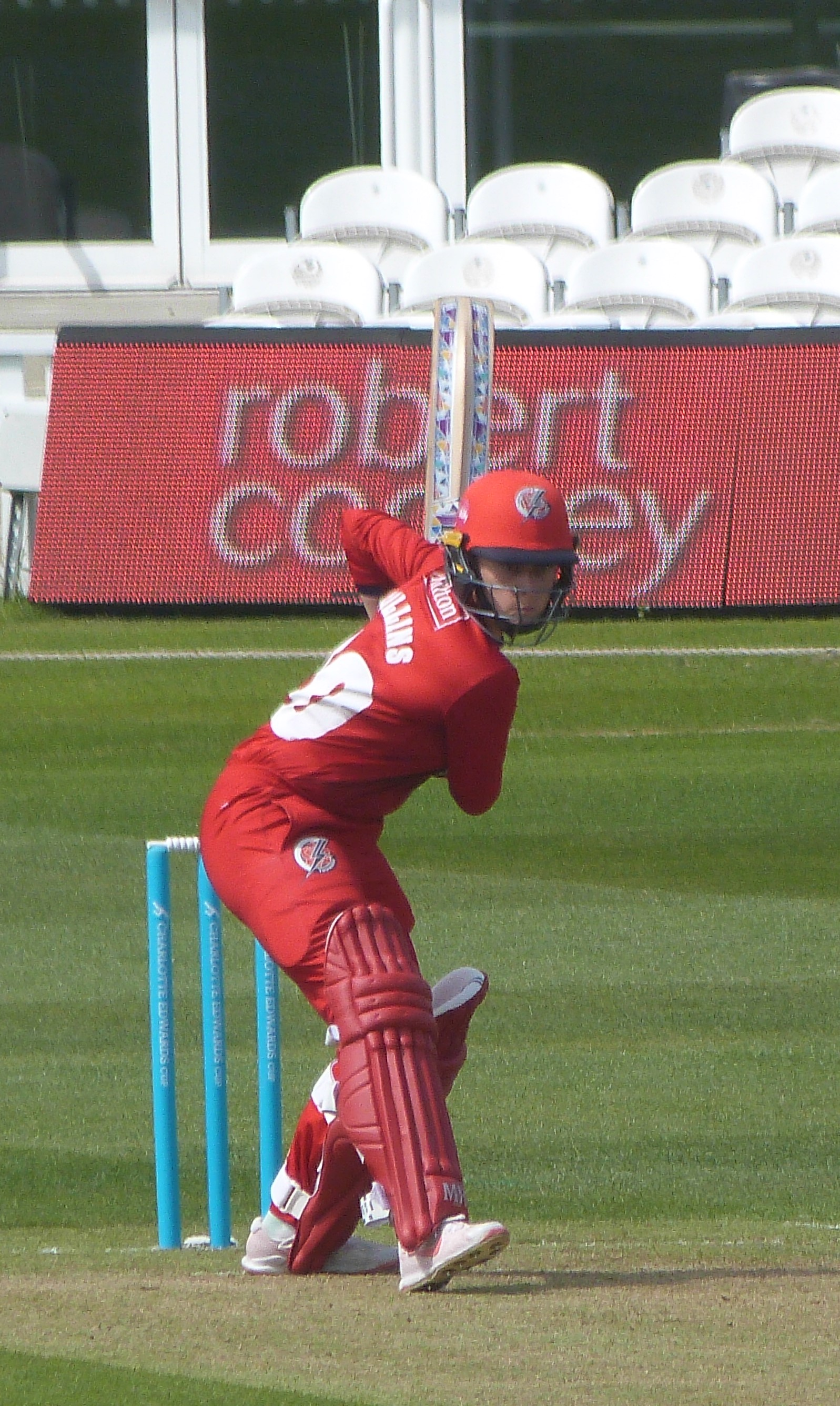
- Collins batting for North West Thunder in May 2023

Personal information
- Full name: Danielle Louise Collins
- Born: 7 June 2000 (age 26); Bury, Greater Manchester, England
- Batting: Left-handed
- Bowling: Right-arm medium
- Role: Batter

Domestic team information
- Years: Team
- 2018–present: Lancashire
- 2019: Lancashire Thunder
- 2020–2024: North West Thunder
- 2021: Cumbria
- 2021: Manchester Originals

Career statistics
Competition	WLA	WT20
Matches	32	54
Runs scored	326	439
Batting average	13.58	13.30
100s/50s	0/0	0/1
Top score	32	51
Balls bowled	18	6
Wickets	0	0
Bowling average	–	–
5 wickets in innings	0	0
10 wickets in match	0	0
Best bowling	–	–
Catches/stumpings	4/–	9/–
- Source: CricketArchive, 17 October 2024

Danielle Louise Collins (born 7 June 2000) is an English cricketer who currently plays for Lancashire. She plays as a left-handed batter.

== Early life ==
Collins was born on 7 June 2000 in Bury, Greater Manchester.

== Domestic career ==
Collins made her county debut in 2018, for Lancashire against Middlesex, in which she scored 19 off 17 balls. In 2019, she scored 77 runs in the County Championship at an average of 19.25.

Collins was also part of the Lancashire Thunder squad in the 2019 Women's Cricket Super League, but did not play a match.

In 2020, after the departure of captain Evelyn Jones, Collins took on the captaincy of Lancashire for two friendlies against Scotland. In 2021, Collins was dual-registered for both Lancashire and Cumbria, appearing for both sides in the 2021 Women's Twenty20 Cup. She scored 127 runs for Lancashire in the 2022 Women's Twenty20 Cup, including her maiden Twenty20 half-century, made against Derbyshire. She played two matches for the side in the 2023 Women's Twenty20 Cup, scoring 50 runs.

In 2020, Collins played for North West Thunder in the Rachael Heyhoe Flint Trophy. She appeared in three matches, scoring 27 runs at an average of 9.00, with a high score of 18 against Northern Diamonds. She appeared in nine matches for the side in 2021, across the Rachael Heyhoe Flint Trophy and the Charlotte Edwards Cup. She was also in the Manchester Originals squad for The Hundred, but did not play a match. She played nine matches for North West Thunder in 2022, across the Charlotte Edwards Cup and the Rachael Heyhoe Flint Trophy, scoring 118 runs.

In 2023, she played 15 matches for North West Thunder, across the Rachael Heyhoe Flint Trophy and the Charlotte Edwards Cup, with a high score of 25. During the season, in June, it was announced that Collins had signed her first professional contract with the side, until the end of the season. In 2024, she played 16 matches for North West Thunder, across the Rachael Heyhoe Flint Trophy and the Charlotte Edwards Cup, with a high score of 30.
