= Daisy Mullan =

English cricketer (born 2002)

Personal information
- Full name: Daisy Elizabeth Mullan
- Born: 29 November 2002 (age 23); Bolton, Greater Manchester, England
- Batting: Right-handed
- Bowling: Right-arm medium
- Role: All-rounder

Domestic team information
- Years: Team
- 2020–present: Lancashire
- 2020–2024: North West Thunder
- 2024: → The Blaze (on loan)
- 2021: North Representative XI
- 2022: Cumbria
- 2022: Manchester Originals

Career statistics
| Competition | WLA | WT20 |
|---|---|---|
| Matches | 17 | 26 |
| Runs scored | 155 | 274 |
| Batting average | 9.68 | 13.04 |
| 100s/50s | 0/0 | 0/1 |
| Top score | 26 | 57* |
| Balls bowled | – | 192 |
| Wickets | – | 9 |
| Bowling average | – | 23.33 |
| 5 wickets in innings | – | 0 |
| 10 wickets in match | – | 0 |
| Best bowling | – | 3/37 |
| Catches/stumpings | 7/– | 2/– |
- Source: CricketArchive, 17 October 2024

Daisy Elizabeth Mullan (born 29 November 2002) is an English cricketer who currently plays for Lancashire. An all-rounder, she is a right-handed batter and right-arm medium bowler. She has previously played for North Representative XI, Cumbria, The Blaze, North West Thunder and Manchester Originals.

== Early life ==
Mullan was born on 29 November 2002, and is from Bolton, Greater Manchester. She has also played as a goalkeeper for Bury FC Women.

== Domestic career ==
Mullan has played for Lancashire since Under-13 level, and captained the side at Under-17 level. She played her first matches for the team at senior level in 2020, appearing in two friendlies against Scotland without batting or bowling.

She made her competitive county debut in 2021, playing for North Representative XI in the Twenty20 Cup, a side made up of players from across the North of England. She took her first wicket and made her T20 high score on debut against Scotland A, making 31* to see her side to an 8 wicket victory. She played three matches for North Representative XI in the tournament before making two appearances for Lancashire, both against Cumbria, but made little impact. She played for Cumbria in the 2022 Women's Twenty20 Cup, scoring 56 runs and taking four wickets. She played for Lancashire in the 2023 Women's Twenty20 Cup, making two appearances and taking four wickets.

Mullan was also named as part of North West Thunder's squad for the 2020 Rachael Heyhoe Flint Trophy, but did not play a match for the side that season. She made her debut for the side in the 2021 Charlotte Edwards Cup against Western Storm, making 2 runs. She played a further three matches in the tournament, with a top score of 26. She also made her List A debut in the 2021 Rachael Heyhoe Flint Trophy. She played seven matches for North West Thunder in 2022, across the Charlotte Edwards Cup and the Rachael Heyhoe Flint Trophy, as well as playing one match for Manchester Originals in The Hundred. At the end of the 2022 season, it was announced that Mullan had signed her first professional contract with North West Thunder. She played three matches for the side in 2023, all in the Rachael Heyhoe Flint Trophy, scoring 26 runs in two innings.

Mullan went on loan to The Blaze from North West Thunder for the first six rounds of the 2024 Rachael Heyhoe Flint Trophy, scoring 47 runs in her four matches. She played one matches for North West Thunder, in the Charlotte Edwards Cup.
