= Grace Johnson (cricketer) =

English cricketer

Personal information
- Full name: Grace May Johnson
- Born: 21 December 2004 (age 21); Burnley, Lancashire, England
- Batting: Right-handed
- Bowling: Right-arm medium
- Role: Bowler

Domestic team information
- Years: Team
- 2021: Cumbria
- 2022–present: Lancashire
- 2024: North West Thunder

Career statistics
Competition	WLA	WT20
Matches	5	21
Runs scored	69	96
Batting average	13.80	10.66
100s/50s	0/0	0/0
Top score	27	36*
Balls bowled	192	330
Wickets	8	16
Bowling average	11.00	18.06
5 wickets in innings	0	0
10 wickets in match	0	0
Best bowling	3/22	2/14
Catches/stumpings	0/–	7/–
- Source: CricketArchive, 17 October 2024

Grace May Johnson (born 21 December 2004) is an English cricketer who currently plays for Lancashire. She plays as a right-arm medium bowler. She has previously played for Cumbria and North West Thunder.

== Early life ==
Johnson was born on 21 December 2004 in Burnley, Lancashire. She attended Burnley College.

== Domestic career ==
Johnson made her county debut for Cumbria on 9 May 2021 against Scotland, taking 1/11 from her four overs. She played four matches for Cumbria that season in the 2021 Women's Twenty20 Cup, and was the side's joint-leading wicket-taker, with five wickets at an average of 14.40. She went on to play for Lancashire from 2022, and took three wickets at an average of 16.66 in the 2023 Women's Twenty20 Cup.

Johnson was first named in the North West Thunder Academy in 2021, and subsequently in 2022, 2023 and 2024. In April 2024, she was first named in a matchday squad for the senior side. She made her debut for the side on 19 June 2024, in the Charlotte Edwards Cup against Northern Diamonds.
