= Liberty Heap =

English cricketer (born 2003)

Personal information
- Full name: Liberty Nicole Heap
- Born: 16 September 2003 (age 23); Burnley, Lancashire, England
- Batting: Right-handed
- Bowling: Right-arm off break
- Role: All-rounder

Domestic team information
- Years: Team
- 2019: Cumbria
- 2020–present: Lancashire
- 2020–2024: North West Thunder
- 2021: North Representative XI
- 2022: Cumbria

Career statistics
Competition	WLA	WT20
Matches	19	26
Runs scored	192	305
Batting average	12.00	16.05
100s/50s	0/0	0/0
Top score	36*	46
Balls bowled	336	91
Wickets	15	3
Bowling average	17.20	38.33
5 wickets in innings	0	0
10 wickets in match	0	0
Best bowling	3/34	2/17
Catches/stumpings	3/–	7/–
- Source: CricketArchive, 6 August 2025

Liberty Nicole Heap (born 16 September 2003) is an English cricketer who currently plays for Lancashire. An all-rounder, she is a right-handed batter and right-arm off break bowler. She previously played for Cumbria, North Representative XI and North West Thunder.

== Early life ==
Heap was born on 16 September 2003 in Burnley, Lancashire.

== Domestic career ==
Heap made her county debut in 2019, for Cumbria against Lincolnshire, in which she scored 17 runs and took 2/23 from 10 overs. This was the only Championship game she played that season, whilst also appearing in two Twenty20 Cup matches. In 2021, Heap was named as part of the Lancashire contingent of the North Representative XI squad for the Twenty20 Cup, playing four matches, scoring 55 runs and taking 2 wickets. She played for Cumbria in the 2022 Women's Twenty20 Cup, taking one wicket.

In 2020, Heap played for North West Thunder in the Rachael Heyhoe Flint Trophy. She appeared in four matches, scoring 28 runs and taking 5 wickets at an average of 18.20. Her best bowling performance came against Lightning, where she took 3/34. She played one match in 2021, scoring 19 and taking 1/41. She played two matches for the side in 2022, both in the Rachael Heyhoe Flint Trophy, taking one wicket as well as hitting 36* from 18 deliveries against Western Storm. In February 2023, it was announced that Heap had signed her first professional contract with North West Thunder. That season, she played 18 matches for the side, across the Rachael Heyhoe Flint Trophy and the Charlotte Edwards Cup, with a top score of 46 against Sunrisers. She was also signed by Manchester Originals for The Hundred, but did not play a match. In 2024, she played five matches for North West Thunder, all in the Charlotte Edwards Cup.

== International career ==
In October 2022, Heap was selected in the England Under-19 squad for the 2023 ICC Under-19 Women's T20 World Cup. She was ever-present throughout the tournament, scoring 149 runs at an average of 21.28. She made one half-century, scoring 64 from 35 deliveries against Rwanda.
