= 2023 Rachael Heyhoe Flint Trophy =

English cricket season

- Dates: 22 April 2023 – 24 September 2023
- Administrator: England and Wales Cricket Board
- Cricket format: 50-over cricket
- Tournament format(s): Double round-robin and knock-out finals
- Champions: Southern Vipers (3rd title)
- Participants: 8
- Matches: 58
- Most runs: Lauren Winfield-Hill (663)
- Most wickets: Georgia Davis (27)
- Official website: ECB

The 2023 Rachael Heyhoe Flint Trophy was the fourth edition of the Rachael Heyhoe Flint Trophy, an English women's cricket 50-over domestic competition, which took place between 22 April and 24 September 2023. It featured eight teams playing in a double round-robin group stage, followed by a knock-out round. It ran alongside the Charlotte Edwards Cup. Northern Diamonds were the defending champions.

Southern Vipers won the tournament, their third Rachael Heyhoe Flint Trophy title, beating The Blaze in the final.

== Format ==
Teams played each other twice in a group of eight, with the top three qualifying for the knock-out stage. This represented a doubling of group stage matches from the previous season, which saw teams play each other once. The second-placed team in the group played the third-placed team in a play-off, with the winner advancing to play the first-placed team in the final. The final was held at the County Ground, Northampton.

== Teams ==
The teams that competed in the tournament are listed below. The Blaze changed their name prior to the 2023 season, having previously been known as Lightning.

- Central Sparks (representing Warwickshire, Worcestershire, Herefordshire, Shropshire and Staffordshire)
- Northern Diamonds (representing Yorkshire, Durham and Northumberland)
- North West Thunder (representing Lancashire, Cheshire and Cumbria)
- South East Stars (representing Surrey and Kent)
- Southern Vipers (representing Hampshire, Sussex, Berkshire, Buckinghamshire, Dorset, Isle of Wight and Oxfordshire)
- Sunrisers (representing Middlesex, Essex, Northamptonshire, Bedfordshire, Cambridgeshire, Hertfordshire, Huntingdonshire, Norfolk and Suffolk)
- The Blaze (representing Derbyshire, Leicestershire, Nottinghamshire and Lincolnshire)
- Western Storm (representing Glamorgan, Gloucestershire, Somerset, Cornwall, Devon, Wiltshire and Cricket Wales)

== Standings ==
Teams received 4 points for a win. A bonus point was given where the winning team's run rate was 1.25 or greater times that of the opposition. In case of a tie in the standings, the following tiebreakers were applied in order: highest net run rate, team that scored the most points in matches involving the tied parties, better bowling strike rate, drawing of lots.

Pos	Team	Pld	W	L	T	NR	BP	Pts	NRR
1	Southern Vipers (Q)	14	7	4	1	2	4	38	0.457
2	The Blaze (Q)	14	7	4	0	3	4	38	0.173
3	South East Stars (Q)	14	7	6	0	1	6	36	0.583
4	Sunrisers	14	6	5	0	3	2	32	−0.006
5	Central Sparks	14	6	5	1	2	1	31	−0.233
6	Northern Diamonds	14	6	7	0	1	4	30	−0.034
7	North West Thunder	14	3	5	2	4	2	26	−0.274
8	Western Storm	14	2	8	0	4	0	16	−1.068

Source: England and Wales Cricket Board

advanced to the Final.
advanced to the Play-off.

== Fixtures ==
=== Group stage ===
22 April 2023
10:30
Scorecard

Northern Diamonds; 290/8 (36 overs)	v	Western Storm; 185 (33.3 overs)
Lauren Winfield-Hill 75 (79); Alex Griffiths 2/40 (7 overs)		Fran Wilson 43 (43); Katie Levick 4/36 (8 overs)

Northern Diamonds won by 105 runs
Headingley Cricket Ground, Leeds
Umpires: Paul Pollard and Rose Dovey

- Western Storm won the toss and elected to field.
- Match reduced to 36 overs per side due to rain.
- Points: Northern Diamonds 5, Western Storm 0

22 April 2023
10:30
Scorecard

Sunrisers; 288/7 (50 overs)	v	Southern Vipers; 162 (35.2 overs)
Mady Villiers 70 (53); Linsey Smith 3/50 (10 overs)		Maia Bouchier 57 (48); Abtaha Maqsood 5/30 (9.2 overs)

Sunrisers won by 126 runs
Rose Bowl, Southampton
Umpires: Billy Taylor and Sophie McLelland

- Sunrisers won the toss and elected to bat.
- Abtaha Maqsood (Sunrisers) took her first five-wicket haul in Women's List A cricket.
- Points: Sunrisers 5, Southern Vipers 0

22 April 2023
10:30
Scorecard

The Blaze; 212 (46.4 overs)	v	Central Sparks; 153 (48.2 overs)
Tammy Beaumont 60 (77); Georgia Davis 3/33 (9 overs)		Katie George 31 (37); Lucy Higham 5/19 (10 overs)

The Blaze won by 59 runs
Trent Bridge, Nottingham
Umpires: Sarah Bartlett and Sue Redfern

- The Blaze won the toss and elected to bat.
- Lucy Higham (The Blaze) took her first five-wicket haul in Women's List A cricket.
- Points: The Blaze 5, Central Sparks 0

22 April 2023
10:30
Scorecard

South East Stars; 334/5 (50 overs)	v	North West Thunder; 203 (42 overs)
Paige Scholfield 111* (90); Alex Hartley 1/22 (4 overs)		Deandra Dottin 51 (42); Freya Davies 3/27 (8 overs)

South East Stars won by 131 runs
Old Trafford Cricket Ground, Manchester
Umpires: Anna Harris and Hassan Adnan

- South East Stars won the toss and elected to bat.
- Paige Scholfield (South East Stars) scored her first century in Women's List A cricket.
- South East Stars' total of 334 equalled the record for the highest total in an innings in the Rachael Heyhoe Flint Trophy.
- Points: South East Stars 5, North West Thunder 0

29 April 2023
10:30
Scorecard

Northern Diamonds; 161 (36.3 overs)	v	Central Sparks; 162/3 (38.2 overs)
Lauren Winfield-Hill 42 (40); Georgia Davis 4/19 (7.3 overs)		Evelyn Jones 67* (111); Jessica Woolston 1/21 (5 overs)

Central Sparks won by 7 wickets
New Road, Worcester
Umpires: Naeem Ashraf and Jasmine Naeem

- Central Sparks won the toss and elected to field.
- Points: Central Sparks 5, Northern Diamonds 0

29 April 2023
10:30
Scorecard

Southern Vipers; 287/6 (20 overs)	v	South East Stars; 129 (36.5 overs)
Ella McCaughan 67 (95); Alice Davidson-Richards 2/30 (6 overs)		Paige Scholfield 31 (63); Lauren Bell 4/37 (8 overs)

Southern Vipers won by 158 runs
County Ground, Beckenham
Umpires: Rose Dovey and Sue Redfern

- Southern Vipers won the toss and elected to bat.
- Points: Southern Vipers 5, South East Stars 0

29 April 2023
10:30
Scorecard

Sunrisers; 159 (46 overs)	v	The Blaze; 160/7 (35.2 overs)
Cordelia Griffith 43 (65); Sarah Glenn 4/22 (10 overs)		Tammy Beaumont 64 (75); Kate Coppack 3/24 (6 overs)

The Blaze won by 3 wickets
County Ground, Chelmsford
Umpires: Sarah Bartlett and Anthony Harris

- Sunrisers won the toss and elected to bat.
- Points: The Blaze 5, Sunrisers 0

29 April 2023
10:30
Scorecard

North West Thunder; 214 (44.4 overs)	v	Western Storm; 215/4 (41.3 overs)
Emma Lamb 74 (85); Chloe Skelton 3/36 (8 overs)		Orla Prendergast 115 (115); Mahika Gaur 3/39 (10 overs)

Western Storm won by 6 wickets
Sophia Gardens, Cardiff
Umpires: Paul Baldwin and Anna Harris

- North West Thunder won the toss and elected to bat.
- Points: Western Storm 4, North West Thunder 0

1 May 2023
10:30
Scorecard

Central Sparks; 183/9 (50 overs)	v	Southern Vipers; 184/7 (41.1 overs)
Ami Campbell 54 (76); Georgia Adams 4/30 (10 overs)		Georgia Adams 50 (71); Emily Arlott 2/23 (9 overs)

Southern Vipers won by 3 wickets
Sir Paul Getty's Ground, Wormsley
Umpires: Anna Harris and Tom Lungley

- Southern Vipers won the toss and elected to field.
- Points: Southern Vipers 4, Central Sparks 0

1 May 2023
10:30
Scorecard

Sunrisers; 157 (46 overs)	v	Northern Diamonds; 160/5 (28.3 overs)
Jodi Grewcock 50 (93); Katie Levick 3/23 (8 overs)		Lauren Winfield-Hill 51 (43); Mady Villiers 3/42 (10 overs)

Northern Diamonds won by 5 wickets
County Ground, Chelmsford
Umpires: Joanne Ibbotson and Rob White

- Sunrisers won the toss and elected to bat.
- Points: Northern Diamonds 5, Sunrisers 0

1 May 2023
10:30
Scorecard

The Blaze	v	North West Thunder

Match abandoned
John Fretwell Sporting Complex, Nettleworth

- No toss.
- No play was possible due to rain.
- Points: The Blaze 2, North West Thunder 2

1 May 2023
10:30
Scorecard

South East Stars; 296/7 (50 overs)	v	Western Storm; 89 (30.5 overs)
Paige Scholfield 134* (109); Danielle Gibson 3/42 (8 overs)		Alex Griffiths 21 (62); Alice Capsey 6/28 (7.5 overs)

South East Stars won by 207 runs
County Ground, Bristol
Umpires: Anthony Harris and Sophie McLelland

- South East Stars won the toss and elected to bat.
- Points: South East Stars 5, Western Storm 0

5 May 2023
10:30
Scorecard

South East Stars; 151/9 (29 overs)	v	Sunrisers; 64 (17 overs)
Kira Chathli 28 (39); Abtaha Maqsood 4/23 (6 overs)		Cordelia Griffith 27 (29); Danielle Gregory 4/12 (5 overs)

South East Stars won by 91 runs (DLS method)
Brunton Memorial Ground, Radlett
Umpires: Sophie McLelland and Tom Lungley

- Sunrisers won the toss and elected to field.
- Match reduced to 29 overs per side due to rain.
- Sunrisers were given a revised target of 156 runs off 29 overs.
- Points: South East Stars 5, Sunrisers 0

6 May 2023
10:30
Scorecard

Northern Diamonds; 62 (18.1 overs)	v	The Blaze; 63/6 (18.5 overs)
Bess Heath 9 (15); Nadine de Klerk 7/33 (9.1 overs)		Marie Kelly 15 (18); Chloe Tyron 4/16 (7.5 overs)

The Blaze won by 4 wickets
Riverside Ground, Chester-le-Street
Umpires: Jasmine Naeem and Neil Pratt

- The Blaze won the toss and elected to field.
- Points: The Blaze 5, Northern Diamonds 0

6 May 2023
10:30
Scorecard

Southern Vipers	v	Western Storm

Match abandoned
County Ground, Hove

- No toss.
- No play was possible due to rain.
- Points: Southern Vipers 2, Western Storm 2

6 May 2023
10:30
Scorecard

North West Thunder; 234 (47.1 overs)	v	Central Sparks; 223/9 (45 overs)
Sophie Ecclestone 74 (65); Erin Burns 4/56 (10 overs)		Evelyn Jones 69 (106); Kate Cross 3/40 (9 overs)

Match Tied (DLS method)
Old Trafford Cricket Ground, Manchester
Umpires: Anthony Harris and Joanne Ibbotson

- Central Sparks won the toss and elected to field.
- Central Sparks were set a revised target of 224 runs from 45 overs due to rain.
- Points: Central Sparks 2, North West Thunder 2

10 May 2023
10:30
Scorecard

South East Stars; 223 (44.2 overs)	v	Northern Diamonds; 178/7 (35.4 overs)
Sophia Dunkley 101* (101); Jessica Woolston 5/37 (9 overs)		Sterre Kalis 66* (98); Ryana MacDonald-Gay 2/25 (4 overs)

Northern Diamonds won by 3 wickets (DLS method)
North Marine Road Ground, Scarborough
Umpires: Phil Mustard and Jasmine Naeem

- Northern Diamonds won the toss and elected to field.
- Northern Diamonds were set a revised target of 178 runs from 36 overs due to rain.
- Points: Northern Diamonds 5, South East Stars 0

10 May 2023
10:30
Scorecard

Southern Vipers; 180 (47.2 overs)	v	Central Sparks; 183/4 (41.2 overs)
Ella McCaughan 59 (90); Erin Burns 5/36 (10 overs)		Evelyn Jones 73 (124); Georgia Elwiss 2/27 (10 overs)

Central Sparks won by 6 wickets
County Ground, Hove
Umpires: Paul Nicholls and Chris Watts

- Central Sparks won the toss and elected to field.
- Points: Central Sparks 4, Southern Vipers 0

10 May 2023
10:30
Scorecard

The Blaze; 209/9 (50 overs)	v	Western Storm; 23/0 (5 overs)
Nadine de Klerk 43 (62); Chloe Skelton 2/23 (7 overs)		Alex Griffiths 14* (25)

No result
Grace Road, Leicester
Umpires: Anna Harris and Billy Taylor

- Western Storm won the toss and elected to field.
- No further play was possible due to rain.
- Points: The Blaze 2, Western Storm 2

10 May 2023
10:30
Scorecard

North West Thunder; 60/2 (15 overs)	v	Sunrisers
Emma Lamb 38* (48); Eva Gray 2/23 (7 overs)

No result
Rookwood Cricket Ground, Sale
Umpires: Grace Bambury and Steve O'Shaughnessy

- Sunrisers won the toss and elected to field.
- Match reduced to 34 overs per side due to rain.
- No further play was possible due to rain.
- Points: North West Thunder 2, Sunrisers 2

2 July 2023
10:30
Scorecard

Central Sparks; 233 (50 overs)	v	North West Thunder; 204 (48.4 overs)
Ami Campbell 68 (72); Tara Norris 4/42 (9 overs)		Seren Smale 94 (125); Katie George 3/57 (9.4 overs)

Central Sparks won by 29 runs
New Road, Worcester
Umpires: James Middlebrook and Sam Hollingshead

- North West Thunder won the toss and elected to field.
- Points: Central Sparks 4, North West Thunder 0

2 July 2023
10:30
Scorecard

South East Stars; 205 (46 overs)	v	Northern Diamonds; 209/3 (33 overs)
Chloe Hill 63 (80); Grace Hall 4/33 (8 overs)		Lauren Winfield-Hill 116* (100); Darcey Carter 2/31 (5 overs)

Northern Diamonds won by 7 wickets
County Ground, Beckenham
Umpires: Fiona Richards and Nigel Llong

- South East Stars won the toss and elected to bat.
- Points: Northern Diamonds 5, South East Stars 0

2 July 2023
10:30
Scorecard

Sunrisers; 254 (49.2 overs)	v	Southern Vipers; 226 (46.3 overs)
Jodi Grewcock 76 (101); Georgia Elwiss 3/37 (10 overs)		Emily Windsor 84 (107); Jodi Grewcock 4/45 (10 overs)

Sunrisers won by 28 runs
County Ground, Chelmsford
Umpires: Amy Clark and Neil Bainton

- Sunrisers won the toss and elected to bat.
- Points: Sunrisers 4, Southern Vipers 0

2 July 2023
10:30
Scorecard

The Blaze; 245 (49.5 overs)	v	Western Storm; 239/7 (50 overs)
Marie Kelly 54 (74); Nicole Harvey 3/32 (10 overs)		Alex Griffiths 67 (118); Teresa Graves 2/28 (6 overs)

The Blaze won by 6 runs
County Ground, Bristol
Umpires: Hassan Adnan and Rose Dovey

- Western Storm won the toss and elected to field.
- Points: The Blaze 4, Western Storm 0

7 July 2023
10:30
Scorecard

Central Sparks; 246/8 (50 overs)	v	South East Stars; 225 (47.3 overs)
Charis Pavely 57* (52); Alice Davidson-Richards 3/46 (9 overs)		Madeleine Blinkhorn-Jones 77 (80); Katie George 3/30 (9.3 overs)

Central Sparks won by 21 runs
Woodbridge Road, Guildford
Umpires: Julia Jarvis and Mark Newell

- Central Sparks won the toss and elected to bat.
- Points: Central Sparks 4, South East Stars 0

7 July 2023
10:30
Scorecard

Northern Diamonds; 185 (50 overs)	v	The Blaze; 189/1 (24.5 overs)
Lauren Winfield-Hill 56 (58); Sophie Munro 3/35 (10 overs)		Tammy Beaumont 83* (62); Katie Levick 1/40 (6 overs)

The Blaze won by 9 wickets
Queen's Park, Chesterfield
Umpires: Fiona Richards and James Middlebrook

- Northern Diamonds won the toss and elected to bat.
- Points: The Blaze 5, Northern Diamonds 0

7 July 2023
10:30
Scorecard

Southern Vipers; 262/8 (50 overs)	v	North West Thunder; 262/8 (50 overs)
Emily Windsor 49 (62); Emma Lamb 2/35 (7 overs)		Eleanor Threlkeld 60 (60); Maitlan Brown 3/52 (10 overs)

Match Tied
Trafalgar Road Ground, Southport
Umpires: Grace Banbury and Hassan Adnan

- Southern Vipers won the toss and elected to bat.
- Points: North West Thunder 2, Southern Vipers 2

11 July 2023
10:30
Scorecard

Western Storm	v	Central Sparks

No result
Scorers, Shirley
Umpires: Joanne Ibbotson and Naeem Ashraf

- Central Sparks won the toss and elected to field.
- No play was possible due to rain.
- Points: Central Sparks 2, Western Storm 2

11 July 2023
10:30
Scorecard

Northern Diamonds; 167 (50 overs)	v	North West Thunder; 168/4 (38.4 overs)
Lauren Winfield-Hill 33 (38); Naomi Dattani 4/16 (6.5 overs)		Deandra Dottin 54* (86); Katie Levick 2/43 (8 overs)

North West Thunder won by 6 wickets
Clifton Park, York
Umpires: Amy Clark and Anthony Harris

- North West Thunder won the toss and elected to field.
- North West Thunder 5, Northern Diamonds 0

11 July 2023
10:30
Scorecard

South East Stars; 290/9 (50 overs)	v	Sunrisers; 262/7 (48 overs)
Tazmin Brits 112* (72); Jodi Grewcock 3/51 (10 overs)		Cordelia Griffith 92 (113); Danielle Gregory 4/26 (5 overs)

South East Stars won by 19 runs (DLS method)
County Ground, Beckenham
Umpires: Fiona Richards and Simon Widdup

- South East Stars won the toss and elected to bat.
- Sunrisers innings reduced to 48 overs due to rain; target was 282.
- Points: South East Stars 4, Sunrisers 0

11 July 2023
10:30
Scorecard

Southern Vipers; 259/7 (50 overs)	v	The Blaze; 260/6 (48.2 overs)
Georgia Adams 94* (104); Nadine de Klerk 3/48 (10 overs)		Marie Kelly 61 (81); Linsey Smith 2/37 (10 overs)

The Blaze won by 4 wickets
Newclose County Cricket Ground, Newport
Umpires: Julia Jarvis and Rose Dovey

- The Blaze won the toss and elected to field.
- Points: The Blaze 4, Southern Vipers 0

14 July 2023
10:30
Scorecard

Sunrisers	v	North West Thunder

Match abandoned
County Ground, Northampton

- No toss.
- No play was possible due to rain.
- Points: Sunrisers 2, North West Thunder 2

15 July 2023
10:30
Scorecard

Northern Diamonds; 223/4 (34 overs)	v	Central Sparks; 164/5 (18.4 overs)
Hollie Armitage 66 (56); Georgia Davis 2/40 (4 overs)		Katie George 56 (35); Katie Levick 3/31 (3.4 overs)

Central Sparks won by 5 wickets (DLS method)
Headingley Cricket Ground, Leeds
Umpires: Grace Bambury and Simon Widdup

- Central Sparks won the toss and elected to field.
- Northern Diamonds innings reduced to 34 overs due to rain.
- Central Sparks innings reduced to 19 overs due to rain; target was 164.
- Points: Central Sparks 4, Northern Diamonds 0

15 July 2023
10:30
Scorecard

Western Storm; 230/5 (48 overs)	v	Southern Vipers; 240/6 (43.4 overs)
Emma Corney 69 (100); Linsey Smith 2/36 (10 overs)		Maia Bouchier 71 (72); Alex Griffiths 2/35 (5.4 overs)

Southern Vipers won by 4 wickets (DLS method)
Millfield School, Street
Umpires: Ben Peverall and Sophie McLelland

- Southern Vipers won the toss and elected to field.
- Match reduced to 48 overs per side due to rain; Southern Vipers target was 238.
- Points: Southern Vipers 4, Western Storm 0

17 July 2023
10:30
Scorecard

The Blaze; 159 (46.2 overs)	v	South East Stars; 161/8 (34.3 overs)
Teresa Graves 56 (96); Freya Davies 3/28 (9 overs)		Tazmin Brits 85 (63); Grace Ballinger 3/26 (8 overs)

South East Stars won by 2 wickets (DLS method)
John Fretwell Sporting Complex, Nettleworth
Umpires: Grace Bambury and Chris Watts

- The Blaze won the toss and elected to bat.
- Match reduced to 48 overs per side due to rain; South East Stars target was 159.
- Points: South East Stars 5, The Blaze 0

22 July 2023
10:30
Scorecard

Central Sparks	v	Sunrisers

Match abandoned
New Road, Worcester

- No toss.
- No play was possible due to rain.
- Points: Central Sparks 2, Sunrisers 2

22 July 2023
10:30
Scorecard

Western Storm; 182/4 (36 overs)	v	South East Stars
Emma Corney 48 (76); Alice Davidson-Richards 2/27 (5 overs)

No result
County Ground, Beckenham
Umpires: James Tredwell and Julia Jarvis

- South East Stars won the toss and elected to field.
- No further play was possible due to rain.
- Points: South East Stars 2, Western Storm 2

22 July 2023
10:30
Scorecard

Northern Diamonds; 105/4 (25.4 overs)	v	Southern Vipers
Hollie Armitage 48 (64); Georgia Adams 2/23 (4.4 overs)

No result
Arundel Castle Cricket Ground, Arundel
Umpires: Anthony Harris and Ben Peverall

- Southern Vipers won the toss and elected to field.
- No further play was possible due to rain.
- Points: Southern Vipers 2, Northern Diamonds 2

22 July 2023
10:30
Scorecard

North West Thunder	v	The Blaze

Match abandoned
Sedbergh School, Sedbergh
Umpires: Amy Clark and Peter Hartley

- No toss.
- No play was possible due to rain.
- Points: North West Thunder 2, The Blaze 2

24 July 2023
10:30
Scorecard

Western Storm; 165/3 (22 overs)	v	Sunrisers; 159/8 (22 overs)
Fran Wilson 56 (52); Amuruthaa Surenkumar 2/37 (5 overs)		Grace Scrivens 39 (45); Sophia Smale 4/34 (4 overs)

Western Storm won by 6 runs
College Ground, Cheltenham
Umpires: Anthony Harris and Joanne Ibbotson

- Sunrisers won the toss and elected to field.
- Match reduced to 22 overs per side due to rain.
- Points: Western Storm 4, Sunrisers 0

5 September 2023
10:30
Scorecard

Central Sparks; 189 (49.5 overs)	v	The Blaze; 193/7 (45.1 overs)
Bethan Ellis 53 (97); Josie Groves 3/39 (10 overs)		Nat Sciver-Brunt 66* (71); Georgia Davis 2/28 (10 overs)

The Blaze won by 3 wickets
Edgbaston Cricket Ground, Birmingham
Umpires: Paul Baldwin and Rose Dovey

- Central Sparks won the toss and elected to bat.
- Points: The Blaze 4, Central Sparks 0

5 September 2023
10:30
Scorecard

Southern Vipers; 261/8 (50 overs)	v	Northern Diamonds; 258/5 (50 overs)
Georgia Adams 82 (98); Grace Hall 4/46 (10 overs)		Hollie Armitage 106* (107); Nancy Harman 1/31 (5 overs)

Southern Vipers won by 3 runs
South Northumberland Cricket Club, Gosforth
Umpires: Amy Clark and James Middlebrook

- Southern Vipers won the toss and elected to bat.
- Points: Southern Vipers 4, Northern Diamonds 0

5 September 2023
10:30
Scorecard

South East Stars; 145 (37.5 overs)	v	North West Thunder; 147/4 (25.5 overs)
Paige Scholfield 38 (48); Olivia Bell 4/23 (8.5 overs)		Emma Lamb 50 (59); Paige Scholfield 1/8 (4 overs)

North West Thunder won by 6 wickets
Woodbridge Road, Guildford
Umpires: Fiona Richards and Waseem Mohammed

- South East Stars won the toss and elected to bat.
- Points: North West Thunder 5, South East Stars 0

5 September 2023
10:30
Scorecard

Western Storm; 143 (45.1 overs)	v	Sunrisers; 144/6 (33.5 overs)
Emma Corney 34 (82); Jodi Grewcock 3/24 (7.1 overs)		Mady Villiers 29 (24); Mollie Robbins 2/23 (6 overs)

Sunrisers won by 4 wickets
Brunton Memorial Ground, Radlett
Umpires: Gabi Brown and Nigel Llong

- Western Storm won the toss and elected to bat.
- Points: Sunrisers 5, Western Storm 0

9 September 2023
10:30
Scorecard

Southern Vipers; 237 (47.5 overs)	v	North West Thunder; 173 (44.3 overs)
Georgia Adams 71 (70); Olivia Bell 3/45 (8.5 overs)		Fi Morris 52 (55); Mary Taylor 4/39 (8.3 overs)

Southern Vipers won by 64 runs
Arundel Castle Cricket Ground, Arundel
Umpires: Anthony Harris and Hassan Adnan

- Southern Vipers won the toss and elected to bat.
- Points: Southern Vipers 5, Thunder 0

10 September 2023
10:30
Scorecard

South East Stars; 278 (50 overs)	v	The Blaze; 171 (38 overs)
Alice Davidson-Richards 101 (128); Grace Ballinger 4/54 (10 overs)		Kirstie Gordon 40 (39); Danielle Gregory 3/32 (7 overs)

South East Stars won by 107 runs
County Ground, Beckenham
Umpires: Grace Bambury and Surendiran Shanmugam

- South East Stars won the toss and elected to bat.
- Points: South East Stars 5, The Blaze 0

10 September 2023
10:30
Scorecard

Central Sparks; 227/8 (50 overs)	v	Sunrisers; 228/6 (45 overs)
Abigail Freeborn 107* (140); Jo Gardner 2/21 (5 overs)		Amara Carr 58 (79); Emily Arlott 2/33 (10 overs)

Sunrisers won by 4 wickets
County Ground, Chelmsford
Umpires: Anthony Harris and James Tredwell

- Central Sparks won the toss and elected to bat.
- Points: Sunrisers 4, Central Sparks 0

10 September 2023
10:30
Scorecard

Northern Diamonds; 281/3 (43 overs)	v	Western Storm; 250/7 (43 overs)
Lauren Winfield-Hill 83 (92); Mollie Robbins 2/41 (9 overs)		Sophie Luff 87 (105); Lizzie Scott 2/30 (7 overs)

Northern Diamonds won by 31 runs
County Ground, Taunton
Umpires: Rose Dovey and Simon Widdup

- Western Storm won the toss and elected to field.
- Match reduced to 43 overs per side due to rain.
- Points: Northern Diamonds 4, Western Storm 0

13 September 2023
10:30
Scorecard

Southern Vipers; 254 (48.2 overs)	v	South East Stars; 196 (47.2 overs)
Linsey Smith 51 (58); Danielle Gregory 4/55 (10 overs)		Aylish Cranstone 69 (64); Linsey Smith 3/34 (10 overs)

Southern Vipers won by 58 runs
Rose Bowl, Southampton
Umpires: Ben Peverall and Rose Dovey

- Southern Vipers won the toss and elected to bat.
- Points: Southern Vipers 5, South East Stars 0

13 September 2023
10:30
Scorecard

Sunrisers; 295/5 (50 overs)	v	The Blaze; 265 (48.1 overs)
Grace Scrivens 107 (136); Teresa Graves 2/25 (6 overs)		Georgie Boyce 104 (126); Eva Gray 4/31 (10 overs)

Sunrisers won by 30 runs
Haslegrave Ground, Loughborough
Umpires: Anthony Harris and Hassan Adnan

- The Blaze won the toss and elected to field.
- Points: Sunrisers 4, The Blaze 0

13 September 2023
10:30
Scorecard

Northern Diamonds; 196 (46.4 overs)	v	North West Thunder; 148 (33.4 overs)
Lauren Winfield-Hill 89 (90); Olivia Bell 4/32 (10 overs)		Seren Smale 33 (50); Katie Levick 4/28 (10 overs)

Northern Diamonds won by 48 runs
Rookwood Cricket Ground, Sale
Umpires: Joanne Ibbotson and Naeem Ashraf

- North West Thunder won the toss and elected to field.
- Points: Northern Diamonds 5, North West Thunder 0

13 September 2023
10:30
Scorecard

Western Storm; 241/8 (50 overs)	v	Central Sparks; 242/3 (44.1 overs)
Nat Wraith 39 (48); Georgia Davis 2/32 (10 overs)		Evelyn Jones 84* (113); Sophia Smale 2/38 (10 overs)

Central Sparks won by 7 wickets
County Ground, Taunton
Umpires: Gabi Brown and Ian Blackwell

- Central Sparks won the toss and elected to field.
- Points: Central Sparks 4, Western Storm 0

16 September 2023
10:30
Scorecard

South East Stars; 283/7 (50 overs)	v	Central Sparks; 131 (35.1 overs)
Bryony Smith 97 (81); Hannah Baker 2/46 (9 overs)		Maddy Green 39 (48); Alice Davidson-Richards 3/20 (8 overs)

South East Stars won by 152 runs
Edgbaston Cricket Ground, Birmingham
Umpires: Joanne Ibbotson and Naeem Ashraf

- Central Sparks won the toss and elected to field.
- Points: South East Stars 5, Central Sparks 0

16 September 2023
10:30
Scorecard

Northern Diamonds; 114/6 (18 overs)	v	Sunrisers; 126/4 (17.3 overs)
Bess Heath 37 (21); Eva Gray 2/24 (5 overs)		Jo Gardner 30* (21); Grace Hall 2/36 (4 overs)

Sunrisers won by 6 wickets (DLS method)
Riverside Ground, Chester-le-Street
Umpires: Gabi Brown and Hassan Adnan

- Sunrisers won the toss and elected to field.
- Match reduced to 18 overs per side due to rain; Sunrisers target was 126.
- Points: Sunrisers 4, Northern Diamonds 0

16 September 2023
10:30
Scorecard

Southern Vipers; 288 (49.5 overs)	v	The Blaze; 162 (39.1 overs)
Maia Bouchier 64 (68); Grace Ballinger 4/58 (9.5 overs)		Marie Kelly 56 (62); Mary Taylor 3/15 (7 overs)

Southern Vipers won by 126 runs
Haslegrave Ground, Loughborough
Umpires: Anthony Harris and Jasmine Naeem

- The Blaze won the toss and elected to field.
- Points: Southern Vipers 5, The Blaze 0

16 September 2023
10:30
Scorecard

Western Storm; 250/7 (50 overs)	v	North West Thunder; 254/5 (46.4 overs)
Sophia Smale 56 (82); Olivia Bell 3/30 (10 overs)		Eleanor Threlkeld 107* (115); Sophia Smale 2/21 (10 overs)

North West Thunder won by 5 wickets
Old Trafford Cricket Ground, Manchester
Umpires: Ben Peverall and Grace Bambury

- Western Storm won the toss and elected to bat.
- Points: North West Thunder 5, Western Storm 0

=== Play-off ===
21 September 2023
10:30
Scorecard

South East Stars; 148 (43.5 overs)	v	The Blaze; 52/2 (8.4 overs)
Ryana MacDonald-Gay 26 (48); Marie Kelly 2/7 (3 overs)		Sarah Bryce 34* (26); Alexa Stonehouse 1/11 (2 overs)

The Blaze won by 8 wickets (DLS method)
County Ground, Beckenham
Umpires: Grace Bambury and James Tredwell

- South East Stars won the toss and elected to bat.
- The Blaze innings reduced to 10 overs due to rain; target was 52.

=== Final ===
24 September 2023
10:30
Scorecard

The Blaze; 200/8 (48 overs)	v	Southern Vipers; 203/5 (40.2 overs)
Tammy Beaumont 76 (104); Linsey Smith 3/30 (10 overs)		Emily Windsor 57* (53); Josie Groves 3/39 (8 overs)

Southern Vipers won by 5 wickets
County Ground, Northampton
Umpires: Ben Peverall and Rose Dovey

- Southern Vipers won the toss and elected to field.
- Match reduced to 48 overs per side due to rain.

== Statistics ==
- Highest score by a team: South East Stars – 334/5 (50 overs) v North West Thunder (22 April).
- Top score by an individual: Paige Scholfield – 134* (109) v Western Storm (1 May).
- Best bowling figures by an individual: Nadine de Klerk – 7/33 (9.1 overs) v Northern Diamonds (6 May).

=== Most runs ===
Player	Team	Matches	Innings	Runs	Average	HS	100s	50s
Lauren Winfield-Hill	Northern Diamonds	14	14	663	51.00	116*	1	5
Georgia Adams	Southern Vipers	13	12	546	49.63	94*	0	5
Evelyn Jones	Central Sparks	13	12	440	44.00	84*	0	4
Paige Scholfield	Southern Vipers	14	13	439	39.90	134*	2	1
Emily Windsor	Southern Vipers	12	11	408	45.33	84	0	4

Source: ESPNCricinfo

=== Most wickets ===
Player	Team	Overs	Wickets	Average	BBI	5w
Georgia Davis	Central Sparks	99.4	27	14.77	4/19	0
Katie Levick	Northern Diamonds	99.0	24	18.12	4/28	0
Danielle Gregory	South East Stars	74.0	21	17.80	4/12	0
Georgia Adams	Southern Vipers	110.0	20	24.15	4/30	0
Linsey Smith	Southern Vipers	111.0	19	19.94	3/29	0

Source: ESPNCricinfo
