= Olivia Bell =

Scottish cricketer (born 2003)

Personal information
- Full name: Olivia Niamh Bell
- Born: 12 November 2003 (age 23); Stockport, Greater Manchester, England
- Batting: Right-handed
- Bowling: Right-arm off break
- Role: Bowler

International information
- National side: Scotland
- ODI debut (cap 18): 17 October 2023 v Ireland
- Last ODI: 21 October 2023 v Ireland
- T20I debut (cap 22): 23 September 2022 v UAE
- Last T20I: 24 October 2023 v Ireland
- T20I shirt no.: 18

Domestic team information
- Years: Team
- 2023–2024: North West Thunder

Career statistics
Competition	WODI	WT20I	WLA	WT20
Matches	6	9	13	21
Runs scored	32	5	84	29
Batting average	10.66	–	12.00	5.80
100s/50s	0/0	0/0	0/0	0/0
Top score	15*	3*	22	7
Balls bowled	288	192	661	433
Wickets	3	12	22	31
Bowling average	53.33	16.16	16.77	13.19
5 wickets in innings	0	0	0	0
10 wickets in match	0	0	0	0
Best bowling	1/15	2/18	4/19	4/37
Catches/stumpings	1/–	2/–	3/–	4/–
- Source: CricketArchive, 17 October 2024

Olivia Niamh Bell (born 12 November 2003) is an English-born Scottish cricketer who currently plays for Scotland. She plays primarily as a right-arm off break bowler.

== Early life ==
Bell was born on 12 November 2003 in Stockport, Greater Manchester.

== Domestic career ==
Bell played age-group cricket for Cheshire between 2017 and 2022. In 2023, she appeared for Scotland A in the Twenty20 Cup, taking three wickets in her four matches, including 2/15 from her four overs against Derbyshire.

In 2022, she was named in the North West Thunder Academy for the first time. She was again named in the Academy squad in 2023. She was first named in a matchday squad for the senior team on 20 May 2023. She made her debut for the side on 31 May 2023, against Southern Vipers in the Charlotte Edwards Cup. She went on to be the side's leading wicket-taker in the tournament, with 11 wickets at an average of 8.27, despite only playing four matches. She was also the side's leading wicket-taker in the Rachael Heyhoe Flint Trophy, with 14 wickets at an average of 9.28, again despite playing only four matches. In 2024, she played one match for North West Thunder.

== International career ==
In August 2022, Bell played for Scotland Under-19s in the Europe Qualifier for the 2023 ICC Under-19 Women's T20 World Cup against the Netherlands. In the first match of the series, she took 3/10 from her four overs.

In August 2022, Bell was named in the Scotland squad for their series against Ireland, but did not play a match. In September 2022, Bell was named in the Scotland squad for the 2022 ICC Women's T20 World Cup Qualifier. She made her Twenty20 International debut in the 5th Place Play-off during the tournament, against the United Arab Emirates on 23 September 2023. She opened the bowling, and took 1/16 from her three overs.

In December 2022, Bell was selected in the Scotland Under-19 squad for the 2023 ICC Under-19 Women's T20 World Cup. She played all four matches for the side at the tournament, taking one wicket.

She made her One Day International debut on 17 October 2023, against Ireland.

In September 2024 she was named in the Scotland squad for the 2024 ICC Women's T20 World Cup.
