= Seren Smale =

Welsh cricketer (born 2004)

Personal information
- Full name: Seren Anna Smale
- Born: 13 December 2004 (age 21); Wrexham, Wales
- Batting: Right-handed
- Role: Wicket-keeper

International information
- National side: England
- T20I debut (cap 66): 14 September 2024 v Ireland
- Last T20I: 15 September 2024 v Ireland

Domestic team information
- Years: Team
- 2019: Cheshire
- 2021–present: Lancashire
- 2021: North Representative XI
- 2021: Cumbria
- 2021–2024: North West Thunder
- 2023: Southern Brave
- 2024: Birmingham Phoenix
- 2025: Manchester Originals

Career statistics
Competition	WT20I	WLA	WT20
Matches	2	28	44
Runs scored	35	796	672
Batting average	17.50	28.42	24.00
100s/50s	0/0	0/6	1/2
Top score	25	99	121*
Catches/stumpings	1/1	7/1	11/3
- Source: CricketArchive, 17 October 2024

Seren Anna Smale (born 13 December 2004) is a Welsh cricketer who currently plays for Lancashire and Manchester Originals. She plays as a right-handed batter and wicket-keeper. She has previously played for Cheshire, North West Thunder and Southern Brave, as well as making appearances for North Representative XI and Cumbria in 2021.

== Early life ==
Smale was born on 13 December 2004 in Wrexham. She plays club cricket for Buckley Cricket Club.

== Domestic career ==
Smale made her county debut in 2019, for Cheshire against Yorkshire. She scored 17* in her second and final match for Cheshire, against Worcestershire.

In 2021, Smale was named in the Lancashire squad, whilst also being dual-registered with Cumbria and appearing for North Representative XI. She scored 76 runs in 6 matches across the tournament. She played for Lancashire in the 2022 Women's Twenty20 Cup, scoring 32 runs in two innings. In the 2023 Women's Twenty20 Cup, she scored 201 runs for the side at an average of 67.00 in four innings for Lancashire, including scoring 121* against Cumbria.

She was named in the North West Thunder Academy squad for the 2021 season. She was added to the full squad in September 2021, and made her debut for the side on 10 September, in a Rachael Heyhoe Flint Trophy match against Southern Vipers. Overall, she played three matches in the tournament, scoring 25 runs. She played two matches for North West Thunder in 2022, both in the Rachael Heyhoe Flint Trophy. Against Western Storm in the final match of the season, Smale scored her maiden half-century, making 57 as well as being part of Thunder's highest-ever opening partnership, of 87 with Deandra Dottin. In February 2023, it was announced that Smale had signed her first professional contract with North West Thunder. In 2023, she played 11 matches for North West Thunder, across the Rachael Heyhoe Flint Trophy and the Charlotte Edwards Cup, including scoring 94 in a Rachael Heyhoe Flint Trophy match against Central Sparks. She was also signed by Southern Brave for The Hundred, but did not play a match. In 2024, she played 22 matches for North West Thunder, across the Rachael Heyhoe Flint Trophy and the Charlotte Edwards Cup, scoring five half-centuries with a high score of 99.

== International career ==
In October 2022, Smale was selected in the England Under-19 squad for the 2023 ICC Under-19 Women's T20 World Cup. She played six matches at the tournament, scoring 121 runs at an average of 30.25, including a Player of the Match performance against Pakistan. Smale made her senior England debut against Ireland in a T20I in Dublin on 14 September 2024. Smale was called-up into England's squad for their tour of South Africa in November 2024, as a replacement for the injured Bess Heath.
