= Alice Clarke =

English cricketer (born 2001)

Personal information
- Full name: Alice Clarke
- Born: 4 August 2001 (age 25); Blackburn, Lancashire, England
- Batting: Left-handed
- Bowling: Right-arm medium
- Role: Wicket-keeper

Domestic team information
- Years: Team
- 2018–present: Lancashire
- 2019–2021: Cumbria
- 2020–2024: North West Thunder
- 2022: North Representative XI

Career statistics
Competition	WLA	WT20
Matches	8	26
Runs scored	174	432
Batting average	21.75	22.73
100s/50s	0/1	0/2
Top score	62	75*
Catches/stumpings	3/2	4/4
- Source: CricketArchive, 17 October 2024

Alice Clarke (born 4 August 2001) is an English cricketer who currently plays for Lancashire . She plays as a left-handed batter and can also play as a wicket-keeper. She has previously played for Cumbria, North Representative XI and North West Thunder.

== Early life ==
Clarke was born on 4 August 2001 in Blackburn, Lancashire.

== Domestic career ==
Clarke made her county debut in 2018, for Lancashire against Worcestershire, in which she scored 2*. This was the only match she played for the side that season, and in 2019 she appeared in four Twenty20 Cup matches for Cumbria. She was the side's leading run-scorer, with 129 runs at an average of 43.00 and a high score of 47, made against Shropshire. In 2021, it was confirmed that Clarke is dual-registered with both Lancashire and Cumbria, and would be part of the Cumbria squad for the upcoming season, playing six matches in the 2021 Women's Twenty20 Cup. In the 2022 Women's Twenty20 Cup, she played for North Representative XI, scoring 77 runs in six matches. In the 2023 Women's Twenty20 Cup, she returned to Lancashire, playing two matches.

In 2020, Clarke played for North West Thunder in the Rachael Heyhoe Flint Trophy. She played one match, against Northern Diamonds, in which she scored 1 run. She was retained in the squad in 2021, 2022 and 2023, but did not play a match in any season. In 2024, she played five matches for North West Thunder in the Rachael Heyhoe Flint Trophy, scoring 87 runs at an average of 17.40.
