= Olivia Thomas (cricketer) =

English cricketer

Personal information
- Full name: Olivia Thomas
- Born: 3 May 2004 (age 22); Manchester, England
- Batting: Right-handed
- Bowling: Right-arm leg break
- Role: Bowler

Domestic team information
- Years: Team
- 2019–present: Lancashire
- 2020: North West Thunder
- 2023: North West Thunder

Career statistics
Competition	WLA	WT20
Matches	8	9
Runs scored	26	6
Batting average	6.50	6.00
100s/50s	0/0	0/0
Top score	16*	5*
Balls bowled	137	144
Wickets	5	6
Bowling average	28.80	19.50
5 wickets in innings	0	0
10 wickets in match	0	0
Best bowling	1/25	2/7
Catches/stumpings	2/–	2/–
- Source: CricketArchive, 16 October 2023

Olivia Thomas (born 3 May 2004) is an English cricketer who currently plays for Lancashire. She plays as a right-arm leg break bowler.

== Early life ==
Thomas was born on 3 May 2004 in Manchester.

== Domestic career ==
Thomas made her county debut in 2019, for Lancashire against Nottinghamshire. She played four matches in her first season, and took 3 wickets at an average of 29.00 in the 2019 Women's County Championship.

In 2020, Thomas played for North West Thunder in the Rachael Heyhoe Flint Trophy. She appeared in three matches, taking 1 wicket, which came against Central Sparks.

In 2022, she played six matches for Lancashire in the 2022 Women's Twenty20 Cup, taking five wickets at an average of 19.40. She returned to the North West Thunder squad ahead of the 2023 season. She played two matches for the side that season, taking one wicket.
