= Sophie Morris (cricketer) =

English cricketer

Personal information
- Full name: Sophie Morris
- Born: 2 January 2004 (age 22); Wirral, Merseyside, England
- Batting: Right-handed
- Bowling: Slow left-arm orthodox
- Role: Bowler

Domestic team information
- Years: Team
- 2022–present: Lancashire
- 2022: North Representative XI
- 2023–2024: North West Thunder

Career statistics
Competition	WLA	WT20
Matches	8	12
Runs scored	4	7
Batting average	2.00	3.50
100s/50s	0/0	0/0
Top score	2*	4
Balls bowled	406	252
Wickets	10	14
Bowling average	25.80	15.35
5 wickets in innings	0	0
10 wickets in match	0	0
Best bowling	3/31	3/13
Catches/stumpings	0/–	3/–
- Source: CricketArchive, 17 October 2024

Sophie Morris (born 2 January 2004) is an English cricketer who currently plays for Lancashire. She plays as a slow left-arm orthodox bowler.

== Domestic career ==
Morris made her county debut in 2022, as part of the Lancashire delegation of the North Representative XI against North East Warriors. Overall, she took two wickets at an average of 22.50 in her two matches in the 2022 Women's Twenty20 Cup.

Morris was named in the North West Thunder Academy squad in 2022 and 2023. In a match against Lightning Academy in May 2022, she took six wickets for zero runs from her 2.1 overs. In June 2023, she was promoted to the senior squad, and made her debut for the side on 7 June 2023, against Northern Diamonds in the Charlotte Edwards Cup. She played two matches overall for the side that season. In 2024, she played ten matches for North West Thunder, across the Rachael Heyhoe Flint Trophy and the Charlotte Edwards Cup, taking 13 wickets.
