= Trafalgar Road Ground =

Cricket ground

Coordinates: 53.6282°N 3.0208°W

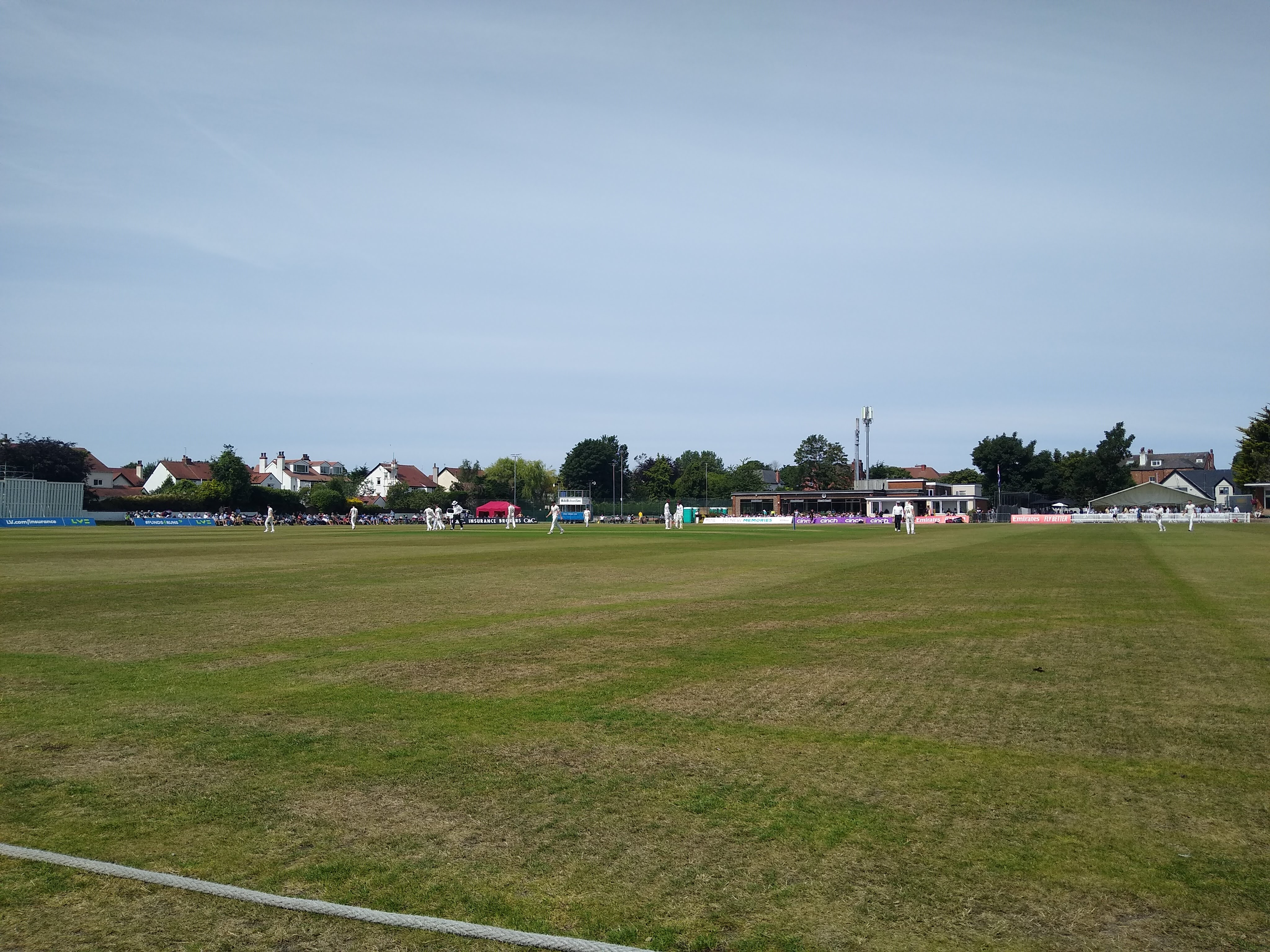
- Trafalgar Road Ground in 2022

Ground information
- Location: Birkdale, Southport, Merseyside
- Establishment: 1956
- End names
- Harrod Drive End; Grosvenor Road End

Team information
Lancashire	(1959–1990, 1992, 1994, 1996, 1999, 2011, 2013, 2017 and 2024.)
- As of 4 September 2010; Source: profile

Trafalgar Road Ground is a cricket ground in the Birkdale area of Southport, Merseyside, England. The first recorded match on the ground was in 1956, when the Lancashire Second XI played Cheshire in the Minor Counties Championship.

In 1959, the ground held its first first-class match when Lancashire played Worcestershire in the County Championship. From 1959 to 2017, the ground played host to 44 first-class matches, the last of which came in the 2017 County Championship between Lancashire and Middlesex. In 2024 the ground hosted LCCC v Nottinghamshire CCC, starting on Sunday 30 June, with the ground being sold out on the Sunday as part of County Cricket Day, an initiative to increase attendance and interest in the County Championship.

The ground has also held List-A matches, the first of which saw Lancashire play Glamorgan in the 1969 Player's County League. From 1969 to 1987, the ground held 4 List-A matches, the last of which saw Lancashire play Scotland in the 1987 Benson and Hedges Cup.

With the first recorded match on the ground in 1956 involving the Lancashire Second XI, the ground has since held a combined total of 25 Second XI fixtures for the Lancashire Second XI in the Minor Counties Championship, Second XI Championship and Second XI Trophy.

In local domestic cricket, the ground is the home venue of Southport & Birkdale Cricket Club who play in the Liverpool & District Cricket Competition.
