= Stephanie Butler =

English cricketer (born 1994)

Personal information
- Full name: Stephanie Butler
- Born: 23 April 1994 (age 32); Stoke-on-Trent, Staffordshire, England
- Batting: Left-handed
- Bowling: Right-arm off break
- Role: All-rounder

Domestic team information
- Years: Team
- 2010–2016: Staffordshire
- 2016–2017: Yorkshire Diamonds
- 2017: Yorkshire
- 2018–present: Staffordshire
- 2020–2022: Central Sparks
- 2023: North West Thunder

Career statistics
| Competition | WLA | WT20 |
|---|---|---|
| Matches | 64 | 67 |
| Runs scored | 813 | 758 |
| Batting average | 19.82 | 25.26 |
| 100s/50s | 0/3 | 0/2 |
| Top score | 70* | 68* |
| Balls bowled | 2,329 | 1,126 |
| Wickets | 68 | 52 |
| Bowling average | 20.02 | 22.23 |
| 5 wickets in innings | 0 | 0 |
| 10 wickets in match | 0 | 0 |
| Best bowling | 4/32 | 4/9 |
| Catches/stumpings | 20/– | 9/– |
- Source: CricketArchive, 16 October 2023

Stephanie Butler (born 23 April 1994) is an English cricketer who currently captains Staffordshire. An all-rounder, she is a left-handed batter and right-arm off break bowler. She has previously played for Central Sparks and North West Thunder, as well as spending one season with Yorkshire and two seasons as part of the Yorkshire Diamonds squad in the Women's Cricket Super League.

== Early life ==
Butler was born on 23 April 1994 in Stoke-on-Trent, Staffordshire.

== Domestic career ==
Butler made her county debut in 2010, for Staffordshire against Scotland. In 2012 she took her best Twenty20 bowling figures, taking 4/9 in a victory over Lancashire. A strong performance in the 2014 Women's County Championship, where she took 12 wickets at an average of 16.08, led to Butler being called up to the England squad for their Test match against India as an injury-replacement for Rebecca Grundy. However, she did not play in the match. In 2016, she scored her maiden county half-century, scoring 51 against Middlesex.

In 2017, Butler spent one season with Yorkshire, and took 8 wickets across the two competitions. In 2018, she returned to Staffordshire and took on the captaincy of the side. Over the next two seasons, Butler was especially successful with bat, and was Staffordshire's leading run-scorer in the 2018 Women's Twenty20 Cup and the 2019 Women's County Championship. In the 2021 Women's Twenty20 Cup, Butler scored 53 runs and took 2 wickets in the three matches she played. She was ever-present for Staffordshire in the 2022 Women's Twenty20 Cup, scoring 132 runs as well as being the side's leading wicket-taker, with 12 wickets.

Butler was also part of the Yorkshire Diamonds squad in the Women's Cricket Super League in 2016 and 2017. She only appeared for the side in 2016, playing four matches and taking two wickets.

In 2020, Butler played for Central Sparks in the Rachael Heyhoe Flint Trophy. She appeared in one match, bowling 9 overs for figures of 0/38 against Northern Diamonds. In 2021, she appeared in six matches for the side, taking three wickets across the Rachael Heyhoe Flint Trophy and the Charlotte Edwards Cup. She appeared in one match for the side in 2022, in the Rachael Heyhoe Flint Trophy. At the end of the 2022 season, Butler left Central Sparks and joined North West Thunder. She played two matches for her new side in 2023, both in the Charlotte Edwards Cup.
