= Mahika Gaur =

English cricketer (born 2006)

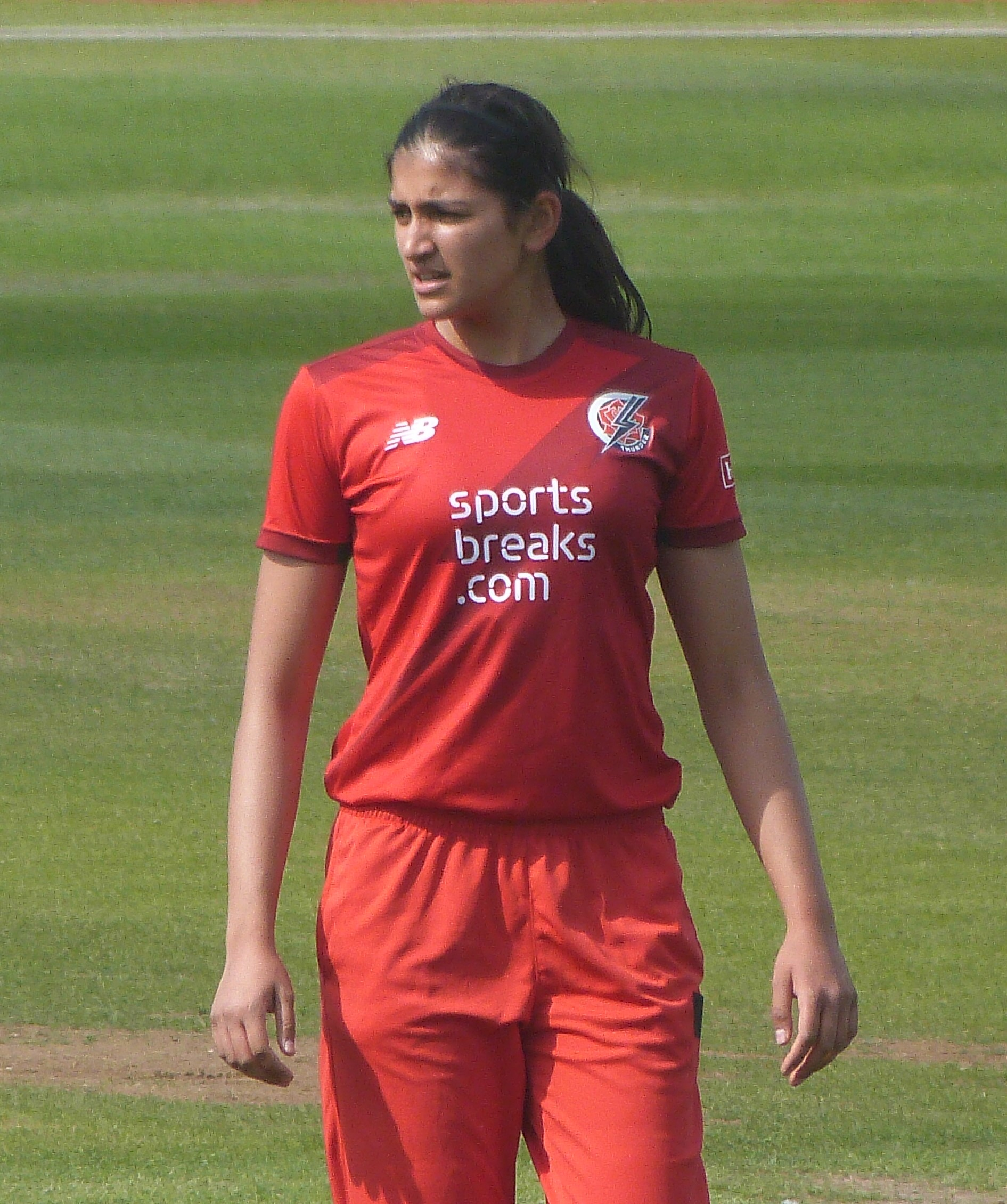
- Gaur on the field for North West Thunder in May 2023

Personal information
- Full name: Mahika Gaur
- Born: 9 March 2006 (age 20); Reading, Berkshire, England
- Height: 1.93 m (6 ft 4 in)
- Batting: Right-handed
- Bowling: Left-arm medium
- Role: Bowler

International information
- National sides: United Arab Emirates (2019–2022); England (2023–present)
- ODI debut (cap 144): 9 September 2023; England v Sri Lanka
- Last ODI: 14 September 2023; England v Sri Lanka
- T20I debut (cap 19/59): 19 January 2019; United Arab Emirates v Indonesia
- Last T20I: 14 September 2024; England v Ireland

Domestic team information
- Years: Team
- 2022–present: Manchester Originals
- 2023–2024: North West Thunder
- 2023: Cumbria

Career statistics
Competition	WODI	WT20I	WLA	WT20
Matches	2	24	12	44
Runs scored	–	12	41	24
Batting average	–	2.40	6.83	3.42
100s/50s	–	0/0	0/0	0/0
Top score	–	6*	11	6*
Balls bowled	74	432	482	814
Wickets	4	11	14	28
Bowling average	13.75	36.36	25.57	29.64
5 wickets in innings	0	0	0	0
10 wickets in match	0	0	0	0
Best bowling	3/26	3/21	3/26	3/21
Catches/stumpings	0/–	4/–	1/–	5/–
- Source: ESPNcricinfo, 17 October 2024

Mahika Gaur (born 9 March 2006) is an English cricketer who plays for Manchester Originals and the England cricket team. She plays as a left-arm medium bowler. She played for the United Arab Emirates from 2019 to 2022, making her Twenty20 International debut against Indonesia at the age of 12. In August 2023, she was selected in her first squad for England, whilst still a student at Sedbergh School.

== Domestic career ==
In July 2022, Gaur was signed by Manchester Originals for the 2022 season of The Hundred. Prior to playing in the Hundred, she appeared for the North West Thunder Academy side, and took 3/25 in a match against the Northern Diamonds Academy on 23 July 2022. She joined Thunder's full squad during the 2023 season. She also played for Cumbria in the 2023 Women's Twenty20 Cup. In June 2023, it was announced that Gaur had signed a part-time professional contract with Thunder, until the end of the 2024 season. She took 11 wickets in 14 matches for the side that season. She also took four wickets in six matches for Manchester Originals in The Hundred. At the end of the season, she was named PCA Women's Young Player of the Year, for both her domestic and international performances. In 2024, she played six matches for North West Thunder, across the Rachael Heyhoe Flint Trophy and the Charlotte Edwards Cup, taking eight wickets.

== International career ==
=== United Arab Emirates ===
Gaur first played for the United Arab Emirates aged 12, appearing in the 2019 Thailand Women's T20 Smash. After playing a match against Thailand A on 12 January, she made her Women's Twenty20 International (WT20I) debut on 19 January 2019, against Indonesia. She went on to play for the UAE at the 2019 ICC Women's Qualifier Asia, the 2021 ICC Women's T20 World Cup Asia Qualifier, the 2022 GCC Women's Gulf Cup and the side's series against Hong Kong. At the ICC Under-19 Women's T20 World Cup Asia Qualifier, Gaur took 5/2 from four overs to help bowl out Nepal for 8. Gaur ended the tournament, which was won by the UAE, as the second-highest wicket-taker, with 11 wickets at an average of 2.36. In October 2022, she played in the Women's Asia Cup, and was the UAE's leading wicket-taker, with six wickets at an average of 19.83.

In December 2022, Gaur was named in the United Arab Emirates squad for the 2023 ICC Under-19 Women's T20 World Cup. She scored 79 runs and took two wickets in the tournament.

=== England ===
In June 2023, Gaur was named in the England Women A squad for the T20 fixtures against Australia Women A. In August 2023, she was named in England's squad for their series against Sri Lanka. She made her One Day International debut for England in September 2023 at Chester-Le-Street, taking 3 wickets as England beat Sri Lanka. In December 2023, she was awarded a development contract by the England and Wales Cricket Board.
