= List of Manchester Super Giants cricketers =

Manchester Super Giants, formerly the Manchester Originals, were formed in 2019, and played their first Hundred match in the 2021 season of The Hundred against Oval Invincibles for both the Men's team and the Women's team. Hundred matches are classed as Twenty20 matches and so have Twenty20 status or Women's Twenty20 status. The players in this list have all played at least one Hundred match for the Manchester Super Giants Men's or Women's team.

Players are listed in order of appearance, where players made their debut in the same match, they are ordered by batting order. Players in Bold were overseas players for the Manchester Originals.

== Key ==
**General**

- ♠ – Captain
- † – Wicket-keeper
- **First** – Year of debut for Manchester Originals
- **Last** – Year of latest match played for Manchester Originals
- **Mat** – Number of matches played for Manchester Originals
- **Win%** – Winning percentage

**Batting**

- **Inn** – Number of innings batted
- **NO** – Number of innings not out
- **Runs** – Runs scored in career
- **HS** – Highest score
- **100** – Centuries scored
- **50** – Half-centuries scored
- **Avg** – Runs scored per dismissal
- * – Batsman remained not out

**Bowling**

- **Balls** – Balls bowled in career
- **Wkt** – Wickets taken in career
- **BBI** – Best bowling in an innings
- **BBM** – Best bowling in a match
- **Ave** – Average runs per wicket

**Fielding**

- **Ca** – Catches taken
- **St** – Stumpings effected

== List of players ==
=== Women's players ===
No.	Name	Nationality	First	Last	Mat	Runs	HS	Avg	Balls	Wkt	BBI	Ave	Ca	St
No.	Name	Nationality	First	Last	Mat	Batting			Bowling				Fielding	
1	**Lizelle Lee**	South Africa	2021	2022	13	384	68	34.90	0	0	–	–	5	0
2	Emma Lamb	England	2021	2024	27	383	57	15.95	185	5	3/16	52.40	4	0
3	Georgie Boyce	England	2021	2021	5	37	21	12.33	0	0	–	–	1	0
4	**Harmanpreet Kaur**	India	2021	2021	3	104	49*	52.00	15	0	–	–	2	0
5	**Mignon du Preez**	South Africa	2021	2021	7	118	31	29.50	0	0	–	–	0	0
6	Sophie Ecclestone ♠	England	2021	2026	40	304	36*	13.82	784	43	4/11	19.79	15	0
7	Kate Cross ♠	England	2021	2022	13	16	12*	4.00	256	17	3/19	18.64	3	0
8	Cordelia Griffith	England	2021	2022	11	34	13*	8.50	0	0	–	–	2	0
9	Ellie Threlkeld ♠†	England	2021	2024	26	83	17	13.83	0	0	–	–	10	10
10	Laura Jackson	England	2021	2021	3	2	2*	–	45	4	2/26	17.25	1	0
11	Alex Hartley	England	2021	2021	7	–	–	–	135	8	3/29	22.37	2	0
12	Natalie Brown	England	2021	2021	4	–	–	–	28	0	–	–	2	0
13	Hannah Jones	England	2021	2022	10	2	2	2.00	170	8	3/17	25.00	3	0
14	Alice Dyson	England	2021	2021	2	–	–	–	15	0	–	–	0	0
15	**Deandra Dottin**	West Indies	2022	2025	18	388	68*	29.85	156	7	2/21	32.43	3	0
16	**Amy Satterthwaite**	New Zealand	2022	2022	4	24	13	8.00	0	0	–	–	1	0
17	Ami Campbell	England	2022	2023	10	97	28	13.85	0	0	–	–	0	0
18	Grace Potts	England	2022	2022	5	4	4*	–	50	0	–	–	1	0
19	**Lea Tahuhu**	New Zealand	2022	2022	2	1	1	1.00	25	0	–	–	1	0
20	**Erin Burns**	Australia	2022	2022	2	33	28	16.50	25	1	1/25	44.00	1	0
21	Phoebe Graham	England	2022	2024	5	–	–	–	60	2	1/19	48.00	0	0
22	Daisy Mullan	England	2022	2022	1	9	9	9.00	0	0	–	–	0	0
23	**Laura Wolvaardt**	South Africa	2023	2024	14	362	78*	30.16	0	0	–	–	4	0
24	Fi Morris	England	2023	2025	22	131	50	9.36	197	11	5/7	23.00	6	0
25	Kathryn Bryce	Scotland	2023	2026	29	361	61*	20.06	390	25	5/13	19.56	5	0
26	**Amanda-Jade Wellington**	Australia	2023	2023	6	66	33*	66.00	110	4	2/17	33.00	0	0
27	Katie George	England	2023	2023	6	22	14*	11.00	30	0	–	–	4	0
28	Mahika Gaur	England	2023	2025	14	9	6	4.50	215	8	2/20	28.00	2	0
29	Amara Carr	England	2023	2023	1	–	–	–	0	0	–	–	0	0
30	**Beth Mooney** ♠†	Australia	2024	2025	16	366	99*	28.15	0	0	–	–	6	5
31	Eve Jones	England	2024	2025	10	110	39	13.75	0	0	–	–	2	0
32	**Kim Garth**	Australia	2024	2024	7	1	1	1.00	130	4	2/17	40.75	0	0
33	Alice Monaghan	England	2024	2025	16	80	26	20.00	71	4	2/7	26.50	4	0
34	Lauren Filer	England	2024	2025	14	39	20*	39.00	240	14	3/8	18.93	2	0
35	Danielle Gregory	England	2024	2025	9	8	8*	8.00	51	2	1/4	35.00	2	0
36	**Amelia Kerr**	New Zealand	2025	2025	8	72	21	9.00	150	6	2/17	28.17	4	0
37	Seren Smale	England	2025	2025	8	121	40*	30.25	0	0	–	–	2	0
38	Esmae MacGregor	England	2025	2025	1	–	–	–	0	0	–	–	0	0
39	**Smriti Mandhana**	India	2026	2026	7	232	88*	38.66	0	0	–	–	3	0
40	**Meg Lanning** ♠	Australia	2026	2026	7	143	43	23.83	0	0	–	–	7	0
41	Grace Scrivens	England	2026	2026	4	53	31	13.25	0	0	–	–	1	0
42	Paige Scholfield	England	2026	2026	5	35	22*	8.75	0	0	–	–	1	0
43	**Richa Ghosh** †	India	2026	2026	7	114	54	19.00	0	0	–	–	3	3
44	Mady Villiers	England	2026	2026	7	30	13	7.50	106	9	3/17	15.88	2	0
45	**Maitlan Brown**	Australia	2026	2026	7	40	16	10.00	85	5	2/18	22.40	1	0
46	Ryana MacDonald-Gay	England	2026	2026	7	23	18*	23.00	110	8	4/17	21.62	1	0
47	Grace Ballinger	England	2026	2026	7	1	1	0.50	110	3	1/9	34.66	3	0
48	Jo Gardner	England	2026	2026	2	1	1	1.00	0	0	–	–	0	0
49	Bex Tyson	England	2026	2026	3	5	4*	–	55	1	1/16	69.00	1	0

=== Men's players ===
No.	Name	Nationality	First	Last	Mat	Runs	HS	Avg	Balls	Wkt	BBI	Ave	Ca	St
No.	Name	Nationality	First	Last	Mat	Batting			Bowling				Fielding	
1	Phil Salt ♠†	England	2021	2025	43	1,138	86	27.09	0	0	–	–	17	2
2	Jos Buttler ♠†	England	2021	2026	35	1,249	90	43.07	0	0	–	–	30	4
3	Joe Clarke	England	2021	2021	7	127	58	18.14	0	0	–	–	2	0
4	**Colin Munro**	New Zealand	2021	2021	7	165	45	33.00	0	0	–	–	1	0
5	Tom Lammonby	England	2021	2022	11	120	27	24.00	5	1	1/8	8.00	5	0
6	**Carlos Brathwaite** ♠	West Indies	2021	2021	7	94	37	23.50	90	3	2/13	49.33	5	0
7	Calvin Harrison	England	2021	2023	9	38	23	9.50	95	7	5/11	18.14	6	0
8	Tom Hartley	England	2021	2025	34	118	17*	11.80	440	31	4/22	19.67	13	0
9	Fred Klaassen	Netherlands	2021	2022	8	11	6*	5.50	114	7	3/23	26.85	3	0
10	Steven Finn	England	2021	2021	5	0	0	0.00	55	6	2/22	18.50	1	0
11	Matt Parkinson	England	2021	2022	16	11	6	3.66	267	20	4/9	17.50	3	0
12	Colin Ackermann	Netherlands	2021	2022	6	91	53	18.20	45	1	1/17	61.00	2	0
13	**Lockie Ferguson**	New Zealand	2021	2021	5	27	13	13.50	80	4	2/37	27.75	0	0
14	Sam Hain	England	2021	2021	1	12	12*	–	0	0	–	–	0	0
15	Dan Douthwaite	England	2021	2021	1	4	4	4.00	0	0	–	–	0	0
16	Wayne Madsen	Italy	2022	2024	21	295	53*	21.07	5	0	–	–	7	0
17	**Andre Russell**	West Indies	2022	2022	6	148	64*	37.00	75	4	1/7	33.25	5	0
18	Paul Walter	England	2022	2026	33	536	80	20.62	350	26	3/20	19.54	18	0
19	Laurie Evans ♠	England	2022	2023	20	286	72	17.87	0	0	–	–	4	0
20	**Ashton Turner**	Australia	2022	2023	13	153	26	21.85	20	2	1/7	15.50	7	0
21	**Sean Abbott**	Australia	2022	2022	5	11	10	5.50	79	6	4/8	24.50	8	0
22	**Tristan Stubbs**	South Africa	2022	2022	9	157	46	19.62	75	4	2/6	27.25	9	0
23	Mitchell Stanley	England	2022	2022	3	–	–	–	45	1	1/23	83.00	0	0
24	**Josh Little**	Ireland	2022	2023	12	6	5*	6.00	192	21	5/13	12.85	1	0
25	Richard Gleeson	England	2022	2023	8	8	8	8.00	138	7	2/22	31.85	0	0
26	Max Holden	England	2023	2024	16	272	40	18.13	0	0	–	–	1	0
27	Jamie Overton	England	2023	2024	18	296	83*	26.90	85	3	2/21	38.00	9	0
28	**Usama Mir**	Pakistan	2023	2024	13	60	32*	10.00	200	12	4/19	24.41	3	0
29	Josh Tongue	England	2023	2026	21	12	8*	12.00	386	35	4/26	15.37	2	0
30	Ben Raine	England	2023	2023	1	–	–	–	10	0	–	–	0	0
31	**Zaman Khan**	Pakistan	2023	2023	5	–	–	–	85	2	2/22	73.50	1	0
32	**Sikandar Raza**	Zimbabwe	2024	2024	8	59	21	8.42	90	4	2/17	33.00	2	0
33	Scott Currie	Scotland	2024	2025	16	60	26*	20.00	248	16	4/28	22.62	7	0
34	**Fazalhaq Farooqi**	Afghanistan	2024	2024	8	7	7*	–	123	7	3/24	26.28	1	0
35	Josh Hull	England	2024	2024	2	–	–	–	25	0	–	–	0	0
36	Matthew Hurst	England	2024	2025	11	159	78	15.90	0	0	–	–	3	0
37	Tom Aspinwall	England	2024	2025	4	18	18*	–	55	3	3/17	22.00	0	0
38	**Heinrich Klaasen**	South Africa	2025	2026	18	328	63	23.43	0	0	–	–	5	0
39	**Mark Chapman**	New Zealand	2025	2025	4	52	28	17.33	0	0	–	–	1	0
40	Lewis Gregory	England	2025	2025	6	84	33*	28.00	64	2	1/10	54.00	4	0
41	**Noor Ahmad**	Afghanistan	2025	2026	16	13	8	3.25	298	12	3/33	38.42	4	0
42	Farhan Ahmed	England	2025	2025	2	–	–	–	10	0	–	–	0	0
43	James Anderson	England	2025	2025	3	2	2*	–	50	2	2/30	45.50	0	0
44	Sonny Baker	England	2025	2026	16	4	2	1.33	286	22	3/21	19.73	5	0
45	George Garton	England	2025	2025	2	4	4	4.00	10	0	–	–	0	0
46	Ben McKinney	England	2025	2025	6	58	29	9.66	0	0	–	–	3	0
47	**Rachin Ravindra**	New Zealand	2025	2025	4	91	47*	30.33	35	3	2/13	15.00	0	0
48	**Ish Sodhi**	New Zealand	2025	2025	2	0	0*	–	25	0	–	–	0	0
49	**Aiden Markram** ♠	South Africa	2026	2026	5	117	50	23.40	5	0	–	–	1	0
50	**Tim Seifert**	New Zealand	2026	2026	10	394	80*	49.25	0	0	–	–	4	0
51	Leus du Plooy	South Africa	2026	2026	10	109	40*	27.25	0	0	–	–	9	0
52	Tom Moores	England	2026	2026	7	55	39*	18.33	0	0	–	–	3	0
53	Liam Dawson	England	2026	2026	10	25	9	8.33	162	10	3/15	23.30	2	0
54	Gus Atkinson	England	2026	2026	10	21	9	10.50	195	12	3/30	22.75	6	0
55	**Michael Bracewell**	New Zealand	2026	2026	4	5	4*	2.50	20	1	1/12	31.00	1	0

== See also ==
- Manchester Super Giants
- The Hundred
