= 2022 Manchester Originals season =

Manchester Originals
2022 season
- Coach: (Australia) Simon Katich (Men's team) (England) Paul Shaw (Women's team)
- Captain: (England) Jos Buttler (Men's team) (England) Kate Cross (Women's team)
- Oversees: (Australia) Sean Abbott (Sri Lanka) Wanindu Hasaranga (Republic of Ireland) Josh Little (South Africa) Tristan Stubbs (Cricket West Indies) Andre Russell (Australia) Ashton Turner (Men's team) (Australia) Erin Burns (Cricket West Indies) Deandra Dottin (South Africa) Lizelle Lee (New Zealand) Amy Satterthwaite (New Zealand) Lea Tahuhu (Women's team)
- Ground(s): Old Trafford
- The Hundred (Men's): 2nd
- The Hundred (Women's): 6th
- Most runs: Phil Salt: 353 (Men's team); Lizelle Lee: 169 (Women's team)
- Most wickets: Paul Walter: 14 (Men's team); Sophie Ecclestone: 8 (Women's team)

The 2022 season was the Manchester Originals second season of the 100 ball franchise cricket, The Hundred. The men's team became the second in the competition to score over 200 runs in a single match, scoring 208 runs against the Northern Superchargers, the same fixture in which the Northern Superchargers became the first team to score 200 runs in a match in the competition's first season. While the women's team performed similarly as the previous season, the men's team improved finishing as runners-up, losing in the final to the Trent Rockets.

== Players ==
=== Men's side ===
- **Bold** denotes players with international caps.

| S/N | Name | Nat. | Date of birth (age) | Batting style | Bowling style | Notes |
Batters
| 7 | Wayne Madsen | (South Africa) | 2 January 1984 (age 42) | Right-handed | Right-arm off break | UK passport |
| 22 | Paul Walter | (England) | 28 May 1994 (age 32) | Left-handed | Left-arm fast-medium | Replacement player |
| 30 | **Tristan Stubbs** | (South Africa) | 14 August 2000 (age 26) | Right-handed | Right-arm off break | Overseas player; Replacement player |
| 32 | Laurie Evans | (England) | 12 October 1987 (age 38) | Right-handed | Right-arm off break | |
All Rounders
| 12 | **Andre Russell** | (Cricket West Indies) | 29 April 1988 (age 38) | Right-handed | Right-arm fast-medium | Overseas player; Ruled out |
| 14 | Tom Lammonby | (England) | 2 June 2000 (age 26) | Left-handed | Left-arm fast-medium | |
| 48 | **Colin Ackermann** | (Netherlands) | 4 April 1991 (age 35) | Right-handed | Right-arm off break | |
| 70 | **Ashton Turner** | (Australia) | 25 January 1993 (age 33) | Right-handed | Right-arm off break | Overseas player |
| — | **Wanindu Hasaranga** | (Sri Lanka) | 29 July 1997 (age 29) | Right-handed | Right-arm leg break | Overseas player; Ruled out |
Wicketkeepers
| 16 | **Phil Salt** | (England) | 28 August 1996 (age 30) | Right-handed | Right-arm off break | |
| 63 | **Jos Buttler** | (England) | 8 September 1990 (age 36) | Right-handed | — | Captain; Centrally Contracted player; Ruled out through injury |
Pace bowlers
| 18 | **Fred Klaassen** | (Netherlands) | 13 November 1992 (age 33) | Right-handed | Left-arm fast-medium | |
| 33 | **Richard Gleeson** | (England) | 2 December 1987 (age 38) | Right-handed | Right-arm fast-medium | Wildcard player |
| 38 | Mitchell Stanley | (England) | 17 March 2001 (age 25) | Right-handed | Right-arm fast-medium | Replacement player |
| 77 | **Sean Abbott** | (Australia) | 29 February 1992 (age 34) | Right-handed | Right-arm fast-medium | Overseas player; Ruled out |
| 82 | **Josh Little** | (Ireland) | 1 November 1999 (age 26) | Right-handed | Left-arm fast-medium | Overseas player; Replacement player |
| — | **Jamie Overton** | (England) | 10 April 1994 (age 32) | Right-handed | Right-arm fast | Ruled out through injury |
| — | **Ollie Robinson** | (England) | 1 December 1993 (age 32) | Right-handed | Right-arm fast-medium | Centrally Contracted player |
| — | **Daniel Worrall** | (Australia) | 10 July 1991 (age 35) | Right-handed | Right-arm fast-medium | UK Passport; Ruled out through injury |
Spin bowlers
| 2 | Tom Hartley | (England) | 3 May 1998 (age 28) | Right-handed | Slow left-arm orthodox | |
| 10 | **Matt Parkinson** | (England) | 24 October 1996 (age 29) | Right-handed | Right-arm leg break | |
| 31 | Calvin Harrison | (England) | 29 April 1998 (age 28) | Right-handed | Right-arm leg break | |

=== Women's side ===
- **Bold** denotes players with international caps.

| S/N | Name | Nat. | Date of birth (age) | Batting style | Bowling style | Notes |
Batters
| 8 | Georgie Boyce | (England) | 4 October 1998 (age 27) | Right-handed | Right-arm medium | |
| 11 | **Amy Satterthwaite** | (New Zealand) | 7 October 1986 (age 39) | Left-handed | Right-arm off break | Overseas player |
| 61 | Ami Campbell | (England) | 6 June 1991 (age 35) | Left-handed | Right-arm medium | |
| 66 | Cordelia Griffith | (England) | 19 September 1995 (age 30) | Right-handed | Right-arm medium | |
| 67 | **Lizelle Lee** | (South Africa) | 2 April 1992 (age 34) | Right-handed | Right-arm medium | Overseas player |
All Rounders
| 5 | **Deandra Dottin** | (Cricket West Indies) | 21 June 1991 (age 35) | Right-handed | Right-arm fast-medium | Overseas player; Ruled out |
| 6 | **Emma Lamb** | (England) | 16 December 1997 (age 28) | Right-handed | Right-arm off break | |
| 29 | **Erin Burns** | (Australia) | 22 June 1988 (age 38) | Right-handed | Right-arm off break | Overseas player; Replacement player |
| 50 | Daisy Mullan | (England) | 29 November 2002 (age 23) | Right-handed | Right-arm medium | Replacement player |
Wicketkeepers
| 21 | Eleanor Threlkeld | (England) | 16 November 1998 (age 27) | Right-handed | — | |
Pace bowlers
| 9 | Grace Potts | (England) | 12 July 2002 (age 24) | Right-handed | Right-arm medium | Ruled out through injury |
| 13 | **Lea Tahuhu** | (New Zealand) | 23 September 1990 (age 35) | Right-handed | Right-arm fast-medium | Overseas player |
| 16 | **Kate Cross** | (England) | 3 October 1991 (age 34) | Right-handed | Right-arm fast-medium | Captain; Centrally Contracted player |
| 17 | Phoebe Graham | (England) | 23 October 1991 (age 34) | Right-handed | Right-arm medium | |
| 22 | Laura Jackson | (England) | 27 December 1997 (age 28) | Right-handed | Right-arm medium | |
| — | **Mahika Gaur** | (United Arab Emirates) | 9 March 2006 (age 20) | Right-handed | Left-arm medium | UK passport |
Spin bowlers
| 7 | Hannah Jones | (England) | 10 February 1999 (age 27) | Left-handed | Slow left-arm orthodox | |
| 19 | **Sophie Ecclestone** | (England) | 6 May 1999 (age 27) | Right-handed | Slow left-arm orthodox | Centrally Contracted player |

== Group fixtures ==
=== Fixtures (Men) ===
5 August 2022
18:30 (N)
Scorecard

| (H) Manchester Originals; 161/4 (100 balls) | v | Northern Superchargers; 162/4 (94 balls) |
| Jos Buttler 59 (41); David Willey 2/24 (20 balls) | | Adam Lyth 51 (30); Ashton Turner 1/7 (5 balls) |

Northern Superchargers won by 6 wickets
Old Trafford, Manchester
Umpires: Rob Bailey (Eng) and Neil Mallender (Eng)
Player of the match: Adam Lyth (Northern Superchargers)

- Northern Superchargers won the toss and elected to field.
- Points: Northern Superchargers 2, Manchester Originals 0.

8 August 2022
18:30 (N)
Scorecard

| (H) London Spirit; 160/6 (100 balls) | v | Manchester Originals; 108 (98 balls) |
| Zak Crawley 41 (34); Paul Walter 2/18 (20 balls) | | Phil Salt 36 (34); Jordan Thompson 4/21 (20 balls) |

London Spirit won by 52 runs
Lord's, London
Umpires: Neil Mallender (Eng) and Russell Warren (Eng)
Player of the match: Jordan Thompson (London Spirit)

- London Spirit won the toss and elected to bat.
- Points: London Spirit 2, Manchester Originals 0.

13 August 2022
14:30
Scorecard

| (H) Manchester Originals; 189/3 (100 balls) | v | Trent Rockets; 193/2 (94 balls) |
| Phil Salt 70* (46); Samit Patel 2/20 (20 balls) | | Dawid Malan 98* (44); Tom Hartley 1/24 (20 balls) |

Trent Rockets won by 8 wickets
Old Trafford, Manchester
Umpires: Nigel Llong (Eng) and Steve O'Shaughnessy (Eng)
Player of the match: Dawid Malan (Trent Rockets)

- Trent Rockets won the toss and elected to field.
- Points: Trent Rockets 2, Manchester Originals 0.

16 August 2022
18:30 (N)
Scorecard

| (H) Manchester Originals; 149/9 (100 balls) | v | Welsh Fire; 102 (89 balls) |
| Phil Salt 38 (22); Jake Ball 4/29 (20 balls) | | Dwaine Pretorius 29 (14); Sean Abbott 4/8 (15 balls) |

Manchester Originals won by 47 runs
Old Trafford, Manchester
Umpires: David Millns (Eng) and Neil Pratt (Eng)
Player of the match: Sean Abbott (Manchester Originals)

- Welsh Fire won the toss and elected to field.
- Points: Manchester Originals 2, Welsh Fire 0.

18 August 2022
19:00 (N)
Scorecard

| Manchester Originals; 188/3 (100 balls) | v | Southern Brave (H); 120 (84 balls) |
| Jos Buttler 68 (42); Jake Lintott 1/28 (20 balls) | | George Garton 25 (14); Paul Walter 3/20 (15 balls) |

Manchester Originals won by 68 runs
Rose Bowl, Southampton
Umpires: Rob Bailey (Eng) and Martin Saggers (Eng)
Player of the match: Andre Russell (Manchester Originals)

- Southern Brave won the toss and elected to field.
- Points: Manchester Originals 2, Southern Brave 0.

21 August 2022
19:00 (N)
Scorecard

| Manchester Originals; 208/5 (100 balls) | v | Northern Superchargers (H); 185/7 (100 balls) |
| Phil Salt 55 (25); Dwayne Bravo 2/42 (20 balls) | | Adam Hose 59 (27); Paul Walter 3/27 (20 balls) |

Manchester Originals won by 23 runs
Headingley, Leeds
Umpires: Mike Burns (Eng) and Rob White (Eng)
Player of the match: Phil Salt (Manchester Originals)

- Northern Superchargers won the toss and elected to field.
- Points: Manchester Originals 2, Northern Superchargers 0.

28 August 2022
19:00 (N)
Scorecard

| Manchester Originals; 154/6 (100 balls) | v | Birmingham Phoenix (H); 75 (74 balls) |
| Phil Salt 56 (38); Benny Howell 3/18 (20 balls) | | Will Smeed 31 (17); Tom Hartley 4/22 (20 balls) |

Manchester Originals won by 79 runs
Edgbaston, Birmingham
Umpires: Paul Pollard (Eng) and Alex Wharf (Eng)
Player of the match: Tom Hartley (Manchester Originals)

- Manchester Originals won the toss and elected to bat.
- Points: Manchester Originals 2, Birmingham Phoenix 0.

31 August 2022
18:30 (N)
Scorecard

| Oval Invincibles; 143/9 (100 balls) | v | Manchester Originals (H); 144/4 (99 balls) |
| Sam Billings 53 (33); Josh Little 5/13 (20 balls) | | Wayne Madsen 53* (39); Danny Briggs 2/22 (20 balls) |

Manchester Originals won by 6 wickets
Old Trafford, Manchester
Umpires: Nigel Llong (Eng) and Alex Wharf (Eng)
Player of the match: Josh Little (Manchester Originals)

- Oval Invincibles won the toss and elected to bat.
- Points: Manchester Originals 2, Oval Invincibles 0.

=== Fixtures (Women) ===
Due to the shortened women's competition, Manchester Originals didn't play against London Spirit.

13 August 2022
11:00
Scorecard

| Trent Rockets; 119/5 (100 balls) | v | Manchester Originals (H); 76 (87 balls) |
| Abigail Freeborn 45* (38); Deandra Dottin 2/21 (20 balls) | | Lizelle Lee 17 (13); Alana King 4/15 (20 balls) |

Trent Rockets won by 43 runs
Old Trafford, Manchester
Umpires: Sue Redfern (Eng) and Billy Taylor (Eng)
Player of the match: Alana King (Trent Rockets)

- Manchester Originals won the toss and elected to field.
- Points: Trent Rockets 2, Manchester Originals 0.

16 August 2022
15:00
Scorecard

| (H) Manchester Originals; 156/2 (100 balls) | v | Welsh Fire; 145/3 (100 balls) |
| Deandra Dottin 67* (37); Alex Hartley 1/17 (20 balls) | | Hayley Matthews 69 (41); Deandra Dottin 2/21 (15 balls) |

Manchester Originals won by 11 runs
Old Trafford, Manchester
Umpires: Jasmine Naeem (Eng) and Mark Newell (Eng)
Player of the match: Deandra Dottin (Manchester Originals)

- Welsh Fire won the toss and elected to field.
- Points: Manchester Originals 2, Welsh Fire 0.

18 August 2022
15:30
Scorecard

| (H) Southern Brave; 136/5 (100 balls) | v | Manchester Originals; 127/8 (100 balls) |
| Smriti Mandhana 43 (25); Sophie Ecclestone 2/32 (20 balls) | | Emma Lamb 57 (45); Amanda-Jade Wellington 3/27 (20 balls) |

Southern Brave won by 9 runs
Rose Bowl, Southampton
Umpires: Hassan Adnan (Eng) and Jasmine Naeem (Eng)
Player of the match: Amanda-Jade Wellington (Southern Brave)

- Manchester Originals won the toss and elected to field.
- Points: Southern Brave 2, Manchester Originals 0.

21 August 2022
15:30
Scorecard

| Manchester Originals; 160/3 (100 balls) | v | Northern Superchargers (H); 161/3 (99 balls) |
| Deandra Dottin 68* (30); Katie Levick 1/21 (20 balls) | | Laura Wolvaardt 90* (49); Emma Lamb 1/23 (15 balls) |

Northern Superchargers won by 7 wickets
Headingley, Leeds
Umpires: Sue Redfern (Eng) and Chris Watts (Eng)
Player of the match: Laura Wolvaardt (Northern Superchargers)

- Manchester Originals won the toss and elected to bat.
- Points: Northern Superchargers 2, Manchester Originals 0.

28 August 2022
15:30
Scorecard

| Manchester Originals; 122/6 (100 balls) | v | Birmingham Phoenix (H); 104 (100 balls) |
| Emma Lamb 30 (21); Emily Arlott 2/17 (20 balls) | | Georgia Elwiss 32 (25); Sophie Ecclestone 3/8 (20 balls) |

Manchester Originals won by 18 runs
Edgbaston, Birmingham
Umpires: Jasmine Naeem (Eng) and Chris Watts (Eng)
Player of the match: Sophie Ecclestone (Manchester Originals)

- Birmingham Phoenix won the toss and elected to field.
- Points: Manchester Originals 2, Birmingham Phoenix 0.

31 August 2022
15:00
Scorecard

| Oval Invincibles; 163/2 (100 balls) | v | Manchester Originals (H); 131/6 (100 balls) |
| Suzie Bates 79* (47); Sophie Ecclestone 1/27 (20 balls) | | Lizelle Lee 64 (41); Marizanne Kapp 2/14 (15 balls) |

Oval Invincibles won by 32 runs
Old Trafford, Manchester
Umpires: Sophie McLelland (Eng) and Paul Pollard (Eng)
Player of the match: Suzie Bates (Oval Invincibles)

- Oval Invincibles won the toss and elected to bat.
- Points: Oval Invincibles 2, Manchester Originals 0.

== Standings ==
=== Women ===
| Pos | Team | Pld | W | L | T | NR | Pts | NRR |
|---|---|---|---|---|---|---|---|---|
| 1 | Oval Invincibles | 6 | 5 | 1 | 0 | 0 | 10 | 1.098 |
| 2 | Southern Brave | 6 | 5 | 1 | 0 | 0 | 10 | 0.806 |
| 3 | Trent Rockets | 6 | 3 | 3 | 0 | 0 | 6 | 0.101 |
| 4 | Birmingham Phoenix | 6 | 3 | 3 | 0 | 0 | 6 | −0.031 |
| 5 | Northern Superchargers | 6 | 3 | 3 | 0 | 0 | 6 | −0.119 |
| 6 | Manchester Originals | 6 | 2 | 4 | 0 | 0 | 4 | −0.478 |
| 7 | London Spirit | 6 | 2 | 4 | 0 | 0 | 4 | −0.557 |
| 8 | Welsh Fire | 6 | 1 | 5 | 0 | 0 | 2 | −0.681 |

Source: BBC Sport, ESPN Cricinfo

advances to Final
advances to the Eliminator

=== Men ===
| Pos | Team | Pld | W | L | T | NR | Pts | NRR |
|---|---|---|---|---|---|---|---|---|
| 1 | Trent Rockets | 8 | 6 | 2 | 0 | 0 | 12 | 0.576 |
| 2 | Manchester Originals | 8 | 5 | 3 | 0 | 0 | 10 | 0.908 |
| 3 | London Spirit | 8 | 5 | 3 | 0 | 0 | 10 | 0.338 |
| 4 | Birmingham Phoenix | 8 | 5 | 3 | 0 | 0 | 10 | −0.172 |
| 5 | Oval Invincibles | 8 | 4 | 4 | 0 | 0 | 8 | 0.385 |
| 6 | Northern Superchargers | 8 | 4 | 4 | 0 | 0 | 8 | 0.009 |
| 7 | Southern Brave | 8 | 3 | 5 | 0 | 0 | 6 | −0.593 |
| 8 | Welsh Fire | 8 | 0 | 8 | 0 | 0 | 0 | −1.442 |

Source: BBC Sport, ESPN Cricinfo

advances to Final
advances to the Eliminator

== Knockout stages ==
=== Men ===
==== Eliminator ====
2 September 2022
18:30 (N)
Scorecard

| London Spirit; 150/7 (100 balls) | v | Manchester Originals; 151/5 (89 balls) |
| Ben McDermott 59 (38); Paul Walter 3/29 (20 balls) | | Laurie Evans 72 (34); Nathan Ellis 2/32 (19 balls) |

Manchester Originals won by 5 wickets
Rose Bowl, Southampton
Umpires: Russell Warren (Eng) and Alex Wharf (Eng)
Player of the match: Laurie Evans (Manchester Originals)

- London Spirit won the toss and elected to bat.

==== Final ====
3 September 2022
18:30 (N)
Scorecard

| Manchester Originals; 120/9 (100 balls) | v | Trent Rockets; 121/8 (98 balls) |
| Ashton Turner 26 (13); Sam Cook 4/18 (20 balls) | | Dawid Malan 19 (18); Josh Little 2/18 (20 balls) |

Trent Rockets won by 2 wickets
Lord's, London
Umpires: Mike Burns (Eng) and Martin Saggers (Eng)
Player of the match: Sam Cook (Trent Rockets)

- Manchester Originals won the toss and elected to bat.
