= 2026 The Hundred personnel signings and auction =

2026 The Hundred Player Auction

General information
- Sport: Cricket
- Dates: 11 & 12 March 2026
- Location: Piccadilly Lights, London, England

Overview
- League: 2026 The Hundred
- Teams: 8

This is a list of auction and personnel signings for the 2026 The Hundred cricket tournament, held in England, and organised by the England Cricket Board.

== Background ==
For the first time, in the 2026 season, a player auction was held in the Hundred replacing the draft used in previous seasons. The auction was held in London, on 11 March 2026 for the women's competition and 12 March 2026 for the men's competition.

== Pre-signed and retained players ==
Each team could retain and sign up to four players before the auction.

=== Women's ===
Birmingham Phoenix (women)
No.	Player	Nationality	Salary
1	Alice Capsey	England	£130,000
2	Ellyse Perry	Australia	£100,000
3	Lauren Filer	England	£95,000
4	Lucy Hamilton	Australia	£90,000

London Spirit (women)
No.	Player	Nationality	Salary
1	Marizanne Kapp	South Africa	£130,000
2	Charlie Dean	England	£85,000
3	Mahika Gaur	England	£75,000
4	Grace Harris	Australia	£70,000

Manchester Super Giants (women)
No.	Player	Nationality	Salary
1	Sophie Ecclestone	England	£110,000
2	Meg Lanning	Australia	£95,000
3	Smriti Mandhana	India	£90,000

MI London (women)
No.	Player	Nationality	Salary
1	Hayley Matthews	West Indies	£120,000
2	Danni Wyatt-Hodge	England	£110,000
3	Amelia Kerr	New Zealand	£80,000

Southern Brave (women)
No.	Player	Nationality	Salary
1	Lauren Bell	England	£140,000
2	Maia Bouchier	England	£85,000
3	Laura Wolvaardt	South Africa	£75,000
4	Jemimah Rodrigues	India	£60,000

Sunrisers Leeds (women)
No.	Player	Nationality	Salary
1	Annabel Sutherland	Australia	£130,000
2	Phoebe Litchfield	Australia	£120,000
3	Kate Cross	England	£50,000

Trent Rockets (women)
No.	Player	Nationality	Salary
1	Nat Sciver-Brunt	England	£140,000
2	Ashleigh Gardner	Australia	£100,000
3	Sophia Dunkley	England	£78,000
4	Kim Garth	Australia	£42,000

Welsh Fire (women)
No.	Player	Nationality	Salary
1	Freya Kemp	England	£120,000
2	Georgia Wareham	Australia	£100,000
3	Georgia Voll	Australia	£80,000

=== Men's ===
Birmingham Phoenix (men)
No.	Player	Nationality	Salary
1	Jacob Bethell	England	£340,000
2	Rehan Ahmed	England	£210,000
3	Donovan Ferreira	South Africa	£210,000
4	Mitchell Owen	Australia	£130,000

London Spirit (men)
No.	Player	Nationality	Salary
1	Liam Livingstone	England	£350,000
2	Jamie Overton	England	£225,000
3	Adam Zampa	Australia	£190,000
4	Dewald Brevis	South Africa	£185,000

Manchester Super Giants (men)
No.	Player	Nationality	Salary
1	Jos Buttler	England	£350,000
2	Heinrich Klaasen	South Africa	£250,000
3	Noor Ahmad	Afghanistan	£175,000
4	Liam Dawson	England	£175,000

MI London (men)
No.	Player	Nationality	Salary
1	Sam Curran	England	£350,000
2	Will Jacks	England	£250,000
3	Nicholas Pooran	West Indies	£175,000
4	Rashid Khan	Afghanistan	£175,000

Southern Brave (men)
No.	Player	Nationality	Salary
1	Jofra Archer	England	£400,000
2	Jamie Smith	England	£300,000
3	Marcus Stoinis	Australia	£150,000
4	Tristan Stubbs	South Africa	£100,000

Sunrisers Leeds (men)
No.	Player	Nationality	Salary
1	Harry Brook	England	£465,000
2	Mitchell Marsh	Australia	£200,000
3	Nathan Ellis	Australia	£145,000
4	Brydon Carse	England	£140,000

Trent Rockets (men)
No.	Player	Nationality	Salary
1	Tim David	Australia	£350,000
2	Tom Banton	England	£225,000
3	Ben Duckett	England	£200,000
4	Mitchell Santner	New Zealand	£175,000

Welsh Fire (men)
No.	Player	Nationality	Salary
1	Phil Salt	England	£450,000
2	Marco Jansen	South Africa	£250,000
3	Rachin Ravindra	New Zealand	£120,000
4	Chris Woakes	England	£110,000

== Player auction ==
=== Sold players ===
==== Women's ====
Sold players
No.	Player	Nationality	Role	Category	Base price	2026 Hundred team	Auctioned price	2025 Hundred team
1	Davina Perrin	England	Batter	Marquee	£37,500	Birmingham Phoenix	£50,000	Northern Superchargers
2	Amy Jones	England	Wicket-keeper	Marquee	£50,000	London Spirit	£70,000	Birmingham Phoenix
3	Sarah Glenn	England	Bowler	Marquee	£50,000	Southern Brave	£75,000	London Spirit
4	Tammy Beaumont	England	Batter	Marquee	£37,500	Birmingham Phoenix	£70,000	Welsh Fire
5	Danielle Gibson	England	All-rounder	Marquee	£50,000	Sunrisers Leeds	£190,000	London Spirit
6	Nadine de Klerk	South Africa	All-rounder	Marquee	£50,000	London Spirit	£170,000	—N/a
7	Deepti Sharma	India	All-rounder	Marquee	£27,500	Sunrisers Leeds	£27,500	—N/a
8	Sophie Devine	New Zealand	All-rounder	Marquee	£50,000	Welsh Fire	£210,000	Southern Brave
9	Sophie Molineux	Australia	All-rounder	Marquee	£37,500	Southern Brave	£47,500	—N/a
10	Beth Mooney	Australia	Wicket-keeper	Marquee	£50,000	Trent Rockets	£210,000	Manchester Originals
11	Lizelle Lee	South Africa	Wicket-keeper	Tier 1	£27,500	Southern Brave	£27,500	—N/a
12	Bryony Smith	England	Batter	Tier 1	£27,500	Sunrisers Leeds	£27,500	Trent Rockets
13	Emma Lamb	England	All-rounder	Tier 1	£27,500	Birmingham Phoenix	£27,500	Birmingham Phoenix
14	Grace Ballinger	England	Bowler	Tier 1	£27,500	Manchester Super Giants	£42,500	Northern Superchargers
15	Issy Wong	England	Bowler	Tier 1	£37,500	Southern Brave	£130,000	London Spirit
16	Maitlan Brown	Australia	All-rounder	Tier 1	£15,000	Manchester Super Giants	£40,000	—N/a
17	Kathryn Bryce	Scotland	All-rounder	Tier 1	£27,500	Manchester Super Giants	£65,000	Manchester Originals
18	Chinelle Henry	West Indies	All-rounder	Tier 1	£27,500	MI London	£70,000	—N/a
19	Jess Jonassen	Australia	All-rounder	Tier 1	£37,500	Sunrisers Leeds	£110,000	Welsh Fire
20	Deandra Dottin	West Indies	All-rounder	Tier 1	£37,500	London Spirit	£37,500	Manchester Originals
21	Linsey Smith	England	Bowler	Tier 1	£50,000	Birmingham Phoenix	£100,000	Northern Superchargers
22	Tilly Corteen-Coleman	England	Bowler	Tier 1	£27,500	Southern Brave	£105,000	Southern Brave
23	Sophia Smale	England	Bowler	Tier 1	£15,000	Welsh Fire	£20,000	Oval Invincibles
24	Alana King	Australia	Bowler	Tier 1	£37,500	Birmingham Phoenix	£37,500	Trent Rockets
25	Kirstie Gordon	Scotland	Bowler	Tier 1	£27,500	MI London	£55,000	Trent Rockets
26	Richa Ghosh	India	Wicket-keeper	Tier 1	£50,000	Manchester Super Giants	£55,000	—N/a
27	Seren Smale	England	Wicket-keeper	Tier 1	£15,000	London Spirit	£15,000	Manchester Originals
28	Hollie Armitage	England	Batter	Tier 2	£27,500	MI London	£45,000	Northern Superchargers
29	Paige Scholfield	England	Batter	Tier 2	£37,500	Manchester Super Giants	£115,000	Oval Invincibles
30	Grace Scrivens	England	All-rounder	Tier 2	£15,000	Manchester Super Giants	£40,000	Trent Rockets
31	Emily Arlott	England	All-rounder	Tier 2	£50,000	Welsh Fire	£110,000	Birmingham Phoenix
32	Mady Villiers	England	All-rounder	Tier 2	£27,500	Manchester Super Giants	£45,000	Southern Brave
33	Nicola Carey	Australia	All-rounder	Tier 2	£27,500	MI London	£95,000	Northern Superchargers
34	Alice Davidson-Richards	England	All-rounder	Tier 2	£27,500	MI London	£30,000	Northern Superchargers
35	Hannah Baker	England	Bowler	Tier 2	£15,000	Sunrisers Leeds	£18,000	Birmingham Phoenix
36	Lucy Higham	England	Bowler	Tier 2	£15,000	London Spirit	£15,000	Northern Superchargers
37	Ryana MacDonald-Gay	England	All-rounder	Longlist	£15,000	Manchester Super Giants	£75,000	Oval Invincibles
38	Ella McCaughan	England	Batter	Longlist	£15,000	Welsh Fire	£30,000	Manchester Originals
39	Sarah Bryce	Scotland	Wicket-keeper	Longlist	£15,000	Welsh Fire	£30,000	Welsh Fire
40	Ailsa Lister	Scotland	Wicket-keeper	Longlist	£15,000	Trent Rockets	£30,000	Birmingham Phoenix
41	Bess Heath	England	Wicket-keeper	Longlist	£15,000	Trent Rockets	£32,500	Northern Superchargers
42	Cordelia Griffith	England	Batter	Longlist	£15,000	Birmingham Phoenix	£27,500	London Spirit
43	Alice Monaghan	England	All-rounder	Longlist	£15,000	MI London	£27,500	Manchester Originals
44	Alexa Stonehouse	England	Bowler	Longlist	£15,000	MI London	£42,500	Trent Rockets
45	Kira Chathli	England	Wicket-keeper	Longlist	£15,000	MI London	£80,000	London Spirit
46	Grace Potts	England	Bowler	Longlist	£15,000	Welsh Fire	£15,000	Northern Superchargers
47	Jodi Grewcock	England	All-rounder	Longlist	£15,000	Southern Brave	£30,000	Trent Rockets
48	Millie Taylor	England	All-rounder	Longlist	£15,000	Trent Rockets	£27,500	Birmingham Phoenix
49	Lauren Winfield-Hill	England	Wicket-keeper	Tier 1	£27,500	Sunrisers Leeds	£27,500	Oval Invincibles
50	Eva Gray	England	Bowler	Longlist	£15,000	Birmingham Phoenix	£30,000	London Spirit
51	Heather Graham	Australia	All-rounder	Longlist	£27,500	Welsh Fire	£27,500	Trent Rockets
52	Jo Gardner	England	All-rounder	Longlist	£15,000	Manchester Super Giants	£17,000	Oval Invincibles
53	Nat Wraith	England	Wicket-keeper	Longlist	£15,000	Manchester Super Giants	£15,000	Trent Rockets
54	Cassidy McCarthy	England	Bowler	Longlist	£15,000	Sunrisers Leeds	£65,000	Trent Rockets
55	Emma Jones	England	All-rounder	Longlist	£15,000	Trent Rockets	£35,000	Trent Rockets
56	Phoebe Brett	England	Bowler	Longlist	£15,000	Birmingham Phoenix	£27,500	Birmingham Phoenix
57	Rebecca Odgers	England	Wicket-keeper	Longlist	£15,000	Southern Brave	£15,000	Oval Invincibles
58	Jemima Spence	England	Wicket-keeper	Longlist	£15,000	Birmingham Phoenix	£37,500	—N/a
59	Tara Norris	United States	All-rounder	Longlist	£27,500	MI London	£35,000	London Spirit
60	Charis Pavely	England	All-rounder	Longlist	£37,500	London Spirit	£85,000	Birmingham Phoenix
61	Fi Morris	England	All-rounder	Longlist	£15,000	Welsh Fire	£20,000	Manchester Originals
62	Rebecca Tyson	England	Bowler	Tier 2	£15,000	Manchester Super Giants	£15,000	London Spirit
63	Esmae MacGregor	England	Bowler	Longlist	£15,000	Birmingham Phoenix	£16,000	Manchester Originals
64	Sterre Kalis	Netherlands	Batter	Tier 1	£27,500	London Spirit	£27,500	Birmingham Phoenix
65	Georgia Elwiss	England	All-rounder	Longlist	£27,500	Trent Rockets	£27,500	Welsh Fire
66	Katie Levick	England	Bowler	Longlist	£15,000	Trent Rockets	£32,500	Welsh Fire
67	Eleanor Threlkeld	England	Wicket-keeper	Longlist	£15,000	MI London	£15,000	Trent Rockets
68	Marie Kelly	England	Batter	Longlist	£15,000	London Spirit	£15,000	Birmingham Phoenix
69	Phoebe Franklin	England	All-rounder	Longlist	£15,000	Southern Brave	£15,000	Oval Invincibles
70	Daisy Gibb	England	Bowler	Longlist	£15,000	Southern Brave	£15,000	Oval Invincibles
71	Josie Groves	England	Bowler	Longlist	£15,000	London Spirit	£15,000	Southern Brave
72	Abi Norgrove	England	Batter	Longlist	£15,000	Welsh Fire	£21,000	London Spirit
73	Grace Thompson	England	All-rounder	Longlist	£15,000	Welsh Fire	£20,000	Trent Rockets
74	Phoebe Turner	England	All-rounder	Longlist	£15,000	London Spirit	£20,000	Southern Brave
75	Charley Phillips	England	Bowler	Longlist	£15,000	Trent Rockets	£15,000	Welsh Fire
76	Kalea Moore	England	All-rounder	Longlist	£15,000	MI London	£15,000	Oval Invincibles
77	Georgia Adams	England	All-rounder	Tier 1	£27,500	Trent Rockets	£30,000	Southern Brave
78	Annerie Dercksen	South Africa	All-rounder	Longlist	£15,000	Birmingham Phoenix	£15,000	—N/a
79	Rhianna Southby	England	Wicket-keeper	Longlist	£15,000	Welsh Fire	£20,000	Southern Brave
80	Ellie Anderson	England	Bowler	Longlist	£15,000	Southern Brave	£15,000	Oval Invincibles
81	Maddie Ward	England	Wicket-keeper	Longlist	£15,000	Sunrisers Leeds	£15,000	—N/a
82	Eve O'Neill	England	Bowler	Longlist	£15,000	Birmingham Phoenix	£15,000	—N/a
83	Danielle Gregory	England	Bowler	Longlist	£15,000	MI London	£15,000	Manchester Originals
84	Samantha Bates	Australia	Bowler	Tier 2	£15,000	Trent Rockets	£15,000	—N/a
85	Rachel Slater	Scotland	Bowler	Longlist	£15,000	Sunrisers Leeds	£15,000	Oval Invincibles
86	Grace Johnson	England	All-rounder	Longlist	£15,000	Trent Rockets	£15,000	—N/a
87	Florence Miller	England	Batter	Longlist	£15,000	Sunrisers Leeds	£15,000	—N/a
88	Claudie Cooper	England	Bowler	Longlist	£15,000	Sunrisers Leeds	£15,000	—N/a

==== Men's ====
Sold players
No.	Player	Nationality	Role	Category	Base price	2026 Hundred team	Auctioned price	2025 Hundred team
1	Joe Root	England	Batter	Marquee	£75,000	Welsh Fire	£240,000	Trent Rockets
2	Adil Rashid	England	Bowler	Marquee	£100,000	Southern Brave	£250,000	Northern Superchargers
3	Jordan Cox	England	Wicket-keeper	Marquee	£75,000	Welsh Fire	£300,000	Oval Invincibles
4	James Vince	England	Batter	Marquee	£100,000	MI London	£190,000	Southern Brave
5	Jonny Bairstow	England	Wicket-keeper	Marquee	£100,000	London Spirit	£160,000	Welsh Fire
6	David Miller	South Africa	Batter	Marquee	£100,000	Southern Brave	£110,000	Northern Superchargers
7	Aiden Markram	South Africa	Batter	Marquee	£100,000	Manchester Super Giants	£200,000	—N/a
8	Finn Allen	New Zealand	Batter	Tier 1	£100,000	Trent Rockets	£160,000	—N/a
9	Ryan Rickelton	South Africa	Wicket-keeper	Tier 1	£100,000	Sunrisers Leeds	£150,000	—N/a
10	Zak Crawley	England	Batter	Tier 1	£31,000	Sunrisers Leeds	£180,000	Northern Superchargers
11	Josh Tongue	England	Bowler	Tier 1	£75,000	Manchester Super Giants	£200,000	Manchester Originals
12	Luke Wood	England	Bowler	Tier 1	£75,000	Southern Brave	£130,000	London Spirit
13	Sonny Baker	England	Bowler	Tier 1	£75,000	Manchester Super Giants	£95,000	Manchester Originals
14	Saqib Mahmood	England	Bowler	Tier 1	£50,000	Birmingham Phoenix	£150,000	Oval Invincibles
15	Tom Curran	England	All-rounder	Tier 1	£100,000	MI London	£260,000	Oval Invincibles
16	Gus Atkinson	England	All-rounder	Tier 1	£50,000	Manchester Super Giants	£70,000	Oval Invincibles
17	David Willey	England	All-rounder	Tier 1	£100,000	London Spirit	£120,000	Trent Rockets
18	Usman Tariq	Pakistan	Bowler	Tier 1	£100,000	Birmingham Phoenix	£140,000	—N/a
19	Joe Clarke	England	Wicket-keeper	Tier 2	£50,000	Birmingham Phoenix	£85,000	Birmingham Phoenix
20	Leus du Plooy	South Africa	Batter	Tier 2	£50,000	Manchester Super Giants	£120,000	Southern Brave
21	Tom Kohler-Cadmore	England	Wicket-keeper	Tier 2	£75,000	Welsh Fire	£80,000	Welsh Fire
22	Will Smeed	England	Batter	Tier 2	£31,000	Birmingham Phoenix	£55,000	Birmingham Phoenix
23	Trent Boult	New Zealand	Bowler	Tier 2	£100,000	MI London	£100,000	Birmingham Phoenix
24	Chris Jordan	England	Bowler	Tier 2	£100,000	Southern Brave	£160,000	Southern Brave
25	David Payne	England	Bowler	Tier 2	£75,000	Trent Rockets	£130,000	Welsh Fire
26	Matthew Potts	England	Bowler	Tier 2	£31,000	Sunrisers Leeds	£75,000	Northern Superchargers
27	James Coles	England	All-rounder	Tier 2	£75,000	London Spirit	£390,000	Southern Brave
28	Lewis Gregory	England	All-rounder	Tier 2	£31,000	Trent Rockets	£55,000	Manchester Originals
29	Dan Lawrence	England	All-rounder	Tier 2	£75,000	Sunrisers Leeds	£210,000	Northern Superchargers
30	Nathan Sowter	England	Bowler	Tier 2	£50,000	MI London	£130,000	Oval Invincibles
31	Tom Hartley	England	All-rounder	Tier 2	£31,000	Manchester Super Giants	£35,000	Manchester Originals
32	Mason Crane	England	Bowler	Tier 2	£31,000	London Spirit	£31,000	Welsh Fire
33	Abrar Ahmed	Pakistan	Bowler	Tier 2	£75,000	Sunrisers Leeds	£190,000	—N/a
34	Ben McKinney	England	Batter	Longlist	£31,000	Southern Brave	£45,000	Manchester Originals
35	Tim Seifert	New Zealand	Wicket-keeper	Tier 1	£100,000	Manchester Super Giants	£100,000	—N/a
36	Benny Howell	England	All-rounder	Longlist	£50,000	Sunrisers Leeds	£50,000	Birmingham Phoenix
37	Craig Overton	England	All-rounder	Longlist	£31,000	Trent Rockets	£120,000	Southern Brave
38	Jordan Thompson	England	All-rounder	Longlist	£31,000	Birmingham Phoenix	£60,000	Southern Brave
39	Tom Moores	England	Wicket-keeper	Longlist	£50,000	Manchester Super Giants	£50,000	Trent Rockets
40	Tom Lawes	England	All-rounder	Longlist	£31,000	Sunrisers Leeds	£40,000	Northern Superchargers
39	Tom Alsop	England	Wicket-keeper	Longlist	£31,000	Sunrisers Leeds	£31,000	Trent Rockets
40	Ben Kellaway	Wales	All-rounder	Longlist	£31,000	Welsh Fire	£37,500	Welsh Fire
41	Thomas Rew	England	Wicket-keeper	Longlist	£31,000	Southern Brave	£80,000	—N/a
42	Adam Milne	New Zealand	Bowler	Longlist	£50,000	London Spirit	£50,000	Birmingham Phoenix
43	Sherfane Rutherford	West Indies	Batter	Longlist	£100,000	MI London	£100,000	—N/a
44	Lockie Ferguson	New Zealand	Bowler	Longlist	£75,000	Welsh Fire	£75,000	Trent Rockets
45	Richard Gleeson	England	Bowler	Longlist	£31,000	MI London	£65,000	London Spirit
46	Dan Mousley	England	All-rounder	Longlist	£31,000	Trent Rockets	£40,000	Birmingham Phoenix
47	Adam Hose	England	Batter	Longlist	£31,000	London Spirit	£31,000	Trent Rockets
48	Scott Currie	Scotland	All-rounder	Longlist	£31,000	Birmingham Phoenix	£210,000	Manchester Originals
49	Matt Henry	New Zealand	Bowler	Longlist	£31,000	Trent Rockets	£75,000	Welsh Fire
50	Sam Billings	England	Wicket-keeper	Longlist	£31,000	Trent Rockets	£180,000	Oval Invincibles
51	Asa Tribe	Jersey	Batter	Longlist	£31,000	Welsh Fire	£70,000	—N/a
52	Tymal Mills	England	Bowler	Longlist	£75,000	London Spirit	£130,000	Southern Brave
53	Laurie Evans	England	Wicket-keeper	Longlist	£50,000	Birmingham Phoenix	£85,000	Southern Brave
54	Michael Pepper	England	Wicket-keeper	Longlist	£31,000	Southern Brave	£85,000	Northern Superchargers
55	Max Holden	England	Batter	Longlist	£31,000	Manchester Super Giants	£31,000	Trent Rockets
56	Chris Wood	England	Bowler	Longlist	£50,000	Birmingham Phoenix	£70,000	Birmingham Phoenix
57	Tawanda Muyeye	Zimbabwe	Batter	Longlist	£50,000	Manchester Super Giants	£50,000	Oval Invincibles
58	Ollie Pope	England	Wicket-keeper	Longlist	£31,000	MI London	£31,000	London Spirit
59	Aneurin Donald	Wales	Wicket-keeper	Longlist	£31,000	Trent Rockets	£31,000	Birmingham Phoenix
60	Tom Aspinwall	England	Bowler	Longlist	£31,000	Welsh Fire	£31,000	Manchester Originals
61	Ben Mayes	England	Batter	Longlist	£31,000	Trent Rockets	£31,000	—N/a
62	James Rew	England	Wicket-keeper	Longlist	£31,000	London Spirit	£31,000	—N/a
63	Tom Abell	England	Batter	Longlist	£31,000	Southern Brave	£31,000	Welsh Fire
64	Lhuan-dre Pretorius	South Africa	Wicket-keeper	Longlist	£31,000	London Spirit	£31,000	—N/a
65	Daniel Worrall	Australia	Bowler	Longlist	£50,000	Southern Brave	£80,000	London Spirit
66	Olly Stone	England	Bowler	Tier 2	£50,000	MI London	£50,000	London Spirit
67	Ethan Brookes	England	All-rounder	Longlist	£31,000	Birmingham Phoenix	£70,000	—N/a
68	Liam Patterson-White	England	All-rounder	Longlist	£31,000	Sunrisers Leeds	£70,000	Birmingham Phoenix
69	Matthew Short	Australia	Batter	Longlist	£75,000	Welsh Fire	£75,000	—N/a
70	Danny Briggs	England	Bowler	Longlist	£31,000	Trent Rockets	£70,000	Southern Brave
71	Sam Cook	England	Bowler	Longlist	£31,000	Welsh Fire	£70,000	Trent Rockets
72	Jafer Chohan	England	Bowler	Tier 1	£31,000	Welsh Fire	£35,000	London Spirit
73	Reece Topley	England	Bowler	Longlist	£31,000	Sunrisers Leeds	£31,000	Southern Brave
74	Mustafizur Rahman	Bangladesh	Bowler	Longlist	£100,000	Birmingham Phoenix	£100,000	—N/a
75	Ollie Sykes	England	Batter	Longlist	£31,000	MI London	£31,000	—N/a
76	George Scrimshaw	England	Bowler	Longlist	£31,000	Manchester Super Giants	£31,000	Oval Invincibles
77	Caleb Falconer	England	All-rounder	Longlist	£31,000	Southern Brave	£55,000	—N/a
78	Nikhil Chaudhary	Australia	All-rounder	Longlist	£31,000	Southern Brave	£31,000	—N/a
79	Matthew Fisher	England	Bowler	Longlist	£31,000	London Spirit	£31,000	—N/a
80	Paul Walter	England	All-rounder	Longlist	£31,000	Manchester Super Giants	£31,000	Welsh Fire
81	Callum Parkinson	England	Bowler	Longlist	£31,000	MI London	£31,000	Trent Rockets
82	Ed Barnard	England	All-rounder	Longlist	£31,000	Sunrisers Leeds	£31,000	—N/a
83	Brad Currie	Scotland	Bowler	Longlist	£31,000	Trent Rockets	£31,000	—N/a
84	Louis Kimber	England	Batter	Longlist	£31,000	Trent Rockets	£31,000	Birmingham Phoenix
85	Jason Roy	England	Batter	Longlist	£31,000	MI London	£31,000	Southern Brave
