= 2024 Manchester Originals season =

Manchester Originals
2024 season
- Coach: Stephen Parry (women); Simon Katich (men)
- Captain: Sophie Ecclestone (women); Jos Buttler (men)
- Overseas player: Sophie Molineux; Beth Mooney; Laura Wolvaardt; (women); Fazalhaq Farooqi; Sikandar Raza; Usama Mir; (men)
- Ground(s): Old Trafford

The 2024 season was the Manchester Originals 4th season of the new franchise 100 ball cricket, The Hundred.

== Players ==
- **Bold** denotes players with international caps.

=== Women's side ===
S/N	Name	Nat.	Date of birth (age)	Batting style	Bowling style	Notes
Batsmen
14	**Laura Wolvaardt**	South Africa	26 April 1999 (age 26)	Right-handed	Right-arm medium	Overseas player
—	Liberty Heap	England	16 September 2003 (age 22)	Right-handed	Right-arm off break	
—	Evelyn Jones	England	8 August 1992 (age 33)	Left-handed	Left-arm medium	
—	Alice Monaghan	England	20 March 2000 (age 25)	Right-handed	Right-arm medium	Wildcard player
All-rounders
6	**Emma Lamb**	England	16 December 1997 (age 27)	Right-handed	Right-arm off break	
73	**Kathryn Bryce**	Scotland	17 November 1997 (age 28)	Right-handed	Right-arm medium	
—	**Sophie Molineux**	Australia	17 January 1998 (age 27)	Left-handed	Slow left-arm orthodox	Overseas player
Wicket-keepers
21	Eleanor Threlkeld	England	16 November 1998 (age 27)	Right-handed	—	
—	**Beth Mooney**	Australia	14 January 1994 (age 31)	Left-handed	—	Overseas player
Pace bowlers
17	Phoebe Graham	England	23 October 1991 (age 34)	Right-handed	Right-arm medium	
39	**Mahika Gaur**	England (Note: Gaur has also played international cricket for the United Arab Emirates.)	9 March 2006 (age 19)	Right-handed	Left-arm medium	
—	**Lauren Filer**	England	22 December 2000 (age 24)	Right-handed	Right-arm fast-medium	
Spin bowlers
19	**Sophie Ecclestone**	England	6 May 1999 (age 26)	Right-handed	Slow left-arm orthodox	Captain
31	Fi Morris	England	31 January 1994 (age 31)	Right-handed	Right-arm off break	
—	Danielle Gregory	England	4 December 1998 (age 27)	Right-handed	Right-arm leg break	Wildcard player

=== Men's side ===
S/N	Name	Nat.	Date of birth (age)	Batting style	Bowling style	Notes
Batsmen
4	Max Holden	England	18 December 1997 (age 27)	Left-handed	Right-arm off break	
7	**Wayne Madsen**	Italy	2 January 1984 (age 41)	Right-handed	Right-arm off break	
All-rounders
8	**Jamie Overton**	England	10 April 1994 (age 31)	Right-handed	Right-arm fast	
22	Paul Walter	England	28 May 1994 (age 31)	Left-handed	Left-arm fast-medium	
—	**Sikandar Raza**	Zimbabwe	24 April 1986 (age 39)	Right-handed	Right-arm off break	Overseas player
Wicket-keepers
16	**Phil Salt**	England	28 August 1996 (age 29)	Right-handed	Right-arm off break	
63	**Jos Buttler**	England	8 September 1990 (age 35)	Right-handed	—	Captain; Centrally contracted player
—	Matthew Hurst	England	10 December 2003 (age 22)	Right-handed	—	Wildcard player
Pace bowlers
18	**Fred Klaassen**	Netherlands	13 November 1992 (age 33)	Right-handed	Left-arm fast-medium	Ruled out
24	**Josh Tongue**	England	15 November 1997 (age 28)	Right-handed	Right-arm fast-medium	Ruled out
38	Mitchell Stanley	England	17 March 2001 (age 24)	Right-handed	Right-arm fast-medium	
—	Tom Aspinwall	England	13 March 2004 (age 21)	Right-handed	Right-arm fast-medium	Replacement player
—	Sonny Baker	England	13 March 2003 (age 22)	Right-handed	Right-arm fast-medium	Wildcard player
—	**Scott Currie**	Scotland	2 May 2001 (age 24)	Right-handed	Right-arm fast-medium	Replacement player
—	**Fazalhaq Farooqi**	Afghanistan	22 September 2000 (age 25)	Right-handed	Left-arm fast-medium	Overseas player
—	Josh Hull	England	20 August 2004 (age 21)	Left-handed	Left-arm fast-medium	
Spin bowlers
2	**Tom Hartley**	England	3 May 1998 (age 27)	Right-handed	Slow left-arm orthodox	
27	**Usama Mir**	Pakistan	23 December 1995 (age 29)	Right-handed	Right-arm leg break	Overseas player

== Standings ==
=== Women ===
Pos	Team	Pld	W	L	T	NR	Pts	NRR	Qualification
1	Welsh Fire	8	5	2	0	1	11	0.334	Advanced to the Final
2	Oval Invincibles	8	5	2	1	0	11	0.034	Advanced to the Eliminator
3	London Spirit	8	4	3	1	0	9	0.080	Advanced to the Eliminator
4	Northern Superchargers	8	3	3	1	1	8	0.942	
5	Trent Rockets	8	4	4	0	0	8	0.407	
6	Manchester Originals	8	3	4	0	1	7	−0.398	
7	Birmingham Phoenix	8	3	4	0	1	7	−0.742	
8	Southern Brave	8	1	6	1	0	3	−0.675	

Source: ESPNcricinfo

=== Men ===
Pos	Team	Pld	W	L	T	NR	Pts	NRR	Qualification
1	Oval Invincibles	8	6	2	0	0	12	0.893	Advanced to the Final
2	Birmingham Phoenix	8	6	2	0	0	12	0.402	Advanced to the Eliminator
3	Southern Brave	8	5	2	0	1	11	0.595	Advanced to the Eliminator
4	Northern Superchargers	8	5	2	0	1	11	−0.453	
5	Trent Rockets	8	4	4	0	0	8	0.348	
6	Welsh Fire	8	2	4	0	2	6	−0.215	
7	Manchester Originals	8	1	7	0	0	2	−0.886	
8	London Spirit	8	1	7	0	0	2	−0.975	

Source: ESPN Cricinfo
