= 2021 Manchester Originals season =

Manchester Originals
2021 season
- Coach: (Australia) Simon Katich (Men's team) (England) Paul Shaw (Women's team)
- Captain: (England) Jos Buttler (Men's team) (England) Kate Cross (Women's team)
- Oversees: (Cricket West Indies) Carlos Brathwaite (New Zealand) Lockie Ferguson (New Zealand) Colin Munro (Men's team) (South Africa) Mignon du Preez (India) Harmanpreet Kaur (South Africa) Lizelle Lee (Women's team)
- Ground(s): Old Trafford
- The Hundred (Men's): 6th
- The Hundred (Women's): 5th
- Most runs: Lizelle Lee: 215 (Women's team); Colin Munro: 165 (Men's team)
- Most wickets: Kate Cross: 12 (Women's team); Matt Parkinson: 9
- Most catches: Calvin Harrison & Carlos Brathwaite: 5 (Men's team); Lizelle Lee: 4 (Women's team)

The 2021 season was the Manchester Originals first season of the new franchise 100 ball cricket, The Hundred.

== Players ==
=== Men's side ===
- **Bold** denotes players with international caps.

| S/N | Name | Nat. | Date of birth (age) | Batting style | Bowling style | Notes |
Batsmen
| 16 | Sam Hain | (England) | 16 July 1995 (age 30) | Right-handed | Right-arm off break | |
| 28 | **Phil Salt** | (England) | 28 August 1996 (age 29) | Right-handed | Right-arm off break | |
| 33 | Joe Clarke | (England) | 26 May 1996 (age 29) | Right-handed | — | |
| 82 | **Colin Munro** | (New Zealand) | 11 March 1987 (age 38) | Left-handed | Right-arm medium | Overseas player |
All Rounders
| 14 | Tom Lammonby | (England) | 2 June 2000 (age 25) | Left-handed | Left-arm fast-medium | |
| 26 | **Carlos Brathwaite** | (Cricket West Indies) | 18 July 1988 (age 37) | Right-handed | Right-arm fast-medium | Overseas player |
| 48 | **Colin Ackermann** | (Netherlands) | 4 April 1991 (age 34) | Right-handed | Right-arm off break | |
| 88 | Dan Douthwaite | (England) | 8 February 1997 (age 28) | Right-handed | Right-arm fast-medium | |
Wicketkeepers
| 63 | **Jos Buttler** | (England) | 8 September 1990 (age 35) | Right-handed | — | Captain; Centrally Contracted player |
Pace bowlers
| 9 | **Steven Finn** | (England) | 4 April 1989 (age 36) | Right-handed | Right-arm fast-medium | |
| 18 | **Fred Klaassen** | (Netherlands) | 13 November 1992 (age 33) | Right-handed | Left-arm fast-medium | Wildcard pick |
| 69 | **Lockie Ferguson** | (New Zealand) | 13 June 1991 (age 34) | Right-handed | Right-arm fast | Overseas player |
| — | **Ollie Robinson** | (England) | 1 December 1993 (age 32) | Right-handed | Right-arm fast-medium | |
Spin bowlers
| 10 | **Matt Parkinson** | (England) | 24 October 1996 (age 29) | Right-handed | Right-arm leg break | |
| 31 | Calvin Harrison | (England) | 29 April 1998 (age 27) | Right-handed | Right-arm leg break | |
| 65 | Tom Hartley | (England) | 3 May 1998 (age 27) | Right-handed | Slow left-arm orthodox | |

=== Women's side ===
- **Bold** denotes players with international caps.

| S/N | Name | Nat. | Date of birth (age) | Batting style | Bowling style | Notes |
Batters
| 8 | Georgie Boyce | (England) | 4 October 1998 (age 27) | Right-handed | Right-arm medium | |
| 22 | **Mignon du Preez** | (South Africa) | 13 June 1989 (age 36) | Right-handed | — | Overseas player |
| 66 | Cordelia Griffith | (England) | 19 September 1995 (age 30) | Right-handed | Right-arm medium | |
| 67 | **Lizelle Lee** | (South Africa) | 2 April 1992 (age 33) | Right-handed | Right-arm medium | Overseas player |
| — | Danielle Collins | (England) | 7 June 2000 (age 25) | Left-handed | Right-arm medium | |
All Rounders
| 6 | Emma Lamb | (England) | 16 December 1997 (age 28) | Right-handed | Right-arm off break | |
| 7 | **Harmanpreet Kaur** | (India) | 8 March 1989 (age 36) | Right-handed | Right-arm off break | Overseas player |
| 10 | Natalie Brown | (England) | 16 October 1990 (age 35) | Right-handed | Right-arm medium | |
Wicketkeepers
| 21 | Eleanor Threlkeld | (England) | 16 November 1998 (age 27) | Right-handed | — | |
Pace bowlers
| 16 | **Kate Cross** | (England) | 3 October 1991 (age 34) | Right-handed | Right-arm fast-medium | Captain; Centrally Contracted player |
| 44 | Laura Jackson | (England) | | Right-handed | Right-arm medium | |
| 63 | Alice Dyson | (England) | 28 January 1999 (age 26) | Right-handed | Right-arm medium | |
Spin bowlers
| 19 | **Sophie Ecclestone** | (England) | 6 May 1999 (age 26) | Right-handed | Slow left-arm orthodox | Centrally Contracted player |
| 29 | Hannah Jones | (England) | 10 February 1999 (age 26) | Left-handed | Slow left-arm orthodox | |
| 65 | **Alex Hartley** | (England) | 6 September 1993 (age 32) | Right-handed | Slow left-arm orthodox | |

== Regular season ==
=== Fixtures (Men) ===
==== July ====
22 July 2021
18:30 (N)
Scorecard

| Oval Invincibles; 145/8 (100 balls) | v | Manchester Originals; 136/7 (100 balls) |
| Sam Billings 49 (30); Fred Klaassen 3/23 (15 balls) | | Carlos Brathwaite 37 (29); Nathan Sowter 2/18 (15 balls) |

Oval Invincibles won by 9 runs
The Oval, London
Attendance: 18,126
Umpires: David Millns and Martin Saggers
Player of the match: Sam Billings (Oval Invincibles)

- Manchester Originals won the toss and elected to field.
- Points: Oval Invincibles 2, Manchester Originals 0.

25 July 2021
18:00 (N)
Scorecard

| Birmingham Phoenix; 87 (84 balls) | v | Manchester Originals; 89/4 (73 balls) |
| Moeen Ali 15 (18); Matt Parkinson 4/9 (19 balls) | | Jos Buttler 30 (31); Moeen Ali 1/15 (20 balls) |

Manchester Originals won by 6 wickets
Old Trafford, Manchester
Attendance: 7,855
Umpires: Steve O'Shaughnessy and Alex Wharf
Player of the match: Matt Parkinson (Manchester Originals)

- Birmingham Phoenix won the toss and elected to bat.
- Points: Manchester Originals 2, Birmingham Phoenix 0.

28 July 2021
18:30 (N)
Scorecard

| Manchester Originals | v | Northern Superchargers |

Match abandoned
Old Trafford, Manchester
Umpires: Peter Hartley and Graham Lloyd

- No toss.
- No play was possible due to rain.
- Points: Manchester Originals 1, Northern Superchargers 1.

31 July 2021
14:30
Scorecard

| Welsh Fire; 150/6 (100 balls) | v | Manchester Originals; 153/3 (95 balls) |
| Leus du Plooy 43 (22); Tom Hartley 2/11 (15 balls) | | Joe Clarke 58 (31); Ryan Higgins 1/9 (10 balls) |

Manchester Originals won by 7 wickets
Sophia Gardens, Cardiff
Umpires: Rob Bailey and Tim Robinson
Player of the match: Joe Clarke (Manchester Originals)

- Welsh Fire won the toss and elected to bat.
- Points: Manchester Originals 2, Welsh Fire 0.

==== August ====
5 August 2021
19:00 (N)
Scorecard

| Manchester Originals; 98/3 (71 balls) | v | Southern Brave |
| Colin Munro 41* (28); Tymal Mills 1/9 (11 balls) |

No result
Old Trafford, Manchester
Umpires: Steve O'Shaughnessy and Tim Robinson

- Southern Brave won the toss and elected to field.
- No further play was possible due to rain.
- Points: Manchester Originals 1, Southern Brave 1.

10 August 2021
18:30 (N)
Scorecard

| London Spirit; 142/6 (100 balls) | v | Manchester Originals; 136/9 (100 balls) |
| Adam Rossington 46 (29); Tom Hartley 3/27 (20 balls) | | Colin Ackermann 53 (40); Brad Wheal 4/17 (20 balls) |

London Spirit won by 6 runs
Old Trafford, Manchester
Umpires: Rob Bailey and Martin Saggers
Player of the match: Brad Wheal (London Spirit)

- London Spirit won the toss and elected to bat.
- Points: London Spirit 2, Manchester Originals 0.

12 August 2021
19:00 (N)
Scorecard

| Northern Superchargers; 200/5 (100 balls) | v | Manchester Originals; 131 (99 balls) |
| John Simpson 71* (28); Lockie Ferguson 2/37 (20 balls) | | Carlos Brathwaite 21 (14); Ben Raine 3/15 (14 balls) |

Northern Superchargers won by 69 runs
Headingley, Leeds
Umpires: Rob Bailey and Martin Saggers
Player of the match: John Simpson (Northern Superchargers)

- Manchester Originals won the toss and elected to field.
- Points: Northern Superchargers 2, Manchester Originals 0.

15 August 2021
19:00 (N)
Scorecard

| Manchester Originals; 135/8 (100 balls) | v | Trent Rockets; 136/3 (95 balls) |
| Colin Munro 45 (22); Rashid Khan 3/16 (20 balls) | | Dawid Malan 52 (46); Matt Parkinson 2/21 (20 balls) |

Trent Rockets won by 7 wickets
Trent Bridge, Nottingham
Umpires: Steve O'Shaughnessy and Russell Warren
Player of the match: Dawid Malan (Trent Rockets)

- Manchester Originals won the toss and elected to bat.
- Points: Trent Rockets 2, Manchester Originals 0.

=== Fixtures (Women) ===
==== July ====
21 July 2021
18:30 (N)
Scorecard

| Manchester Originals; 135/6 (100 balls) | v | Oval Invincibles; 139/5 (98 balls) |
| Lizelle Lee 42 (39); Tash Farrant 3/25 (20 balls) | | Dane van Niekerk 56* (42); Kate Cross 3/28 (18 balls) |

Oval Invincibles won by 5 wickets
The Oval, London
Umpires: Sue Redfern and Tim Robinson
Player of the match: Dane van Niekerk (Oval Invincibles)

- Manchester Originals won the toss and elected to bat.
- Points: Oval Invincibles 2, Manchester Originals 0.

25 July 2021
14:30
Scorecard

| Birmingham Phoenix; 113/9 (100 balls) | v | Manchester Originals; 93/8 (100 balls) |
| Amy Jones 31 (17); Emma Lamb 3/16 (20 balls) | | Harmanpreet Kaur 49* (47); Kirstie Gordon 3/14 (20 balls) |

Birmingham Phoenix won by 20 runs
Old Trafford, Manchester
Umpires: Neil Mallender and Jasmine Naeem
Player of the match: Kirstie Gordon (Birmingham Phoenix)

- Birmingham Phoenix won the toss and elected to bat.
- Points: Birmingham Phoenix 2, Manchester Originals 0.

28 July 2021
15:00
Scorecard

| Manchester Originals | v | Northern Superchargers |

Match abandoned
Old Trafford, Manchester
Umpires: Anna Harris and David Millns

- No toss.
- No play was possible due to rain.
- Points: Manchester Originals 1, Northern Superchargers 1.

31 July 2021
11:00
Scorecard

| Manchester Originals; 120/6 (100 balls) | v | Welsh Fire; 124/1 (88 balls) |
| Sophie Ecclestone 31* (15); Georgia Hennessy 2/24 (20 balls) | | Hayley Matthews 71* (50); Laura Jackson 1/27 (15 balls) |

Welsh Fire won by 9 wickets
Sophia Gardens, Cardiff
Umpires: Neil Mallender and Sue Redfern
Player of the match: Hayley Matthews (Welsh Fire)

- Welsh Fire won the toss and elected to field.
- Points: Welsh Fire 2, Manchester Originals 0.

==== August ====
5 August 2021
15:30
Scorecard

| Southern Brave; 123/7 (100 balls) | v | Manchester Originals; 97/1 (70 balls) |
| Sophia Dunkley 28 (25); Hannah Jones 3/17 (20 overs) | | Lizelle Lee 43* (32) |

Manchester Originals won by 17 runs (DLS Method)
Old Trafford, Manchester
Umpires: Anna Harris and Alex Wharf
Player of the match: Lizelle Lee (Manchester Originals)

- Manchester Originals won the toss and elected to field.
- No further play was possible due to rain. Manchester Originals were 17 runs ahead of the DLS par score of 80 runs from 70 balls.
- Points: Manchester Originals 2, Southern Brave 0.

10 August 2021
15:00
Scorecard

| Manchester Originals; 127/5 (100 balls) | v | London Spirit; 131/5 (98 balls) |
| Emma Lamb 39 (30); Deepti Sharma 2/10 (20 balls) | | Heather Knight 35 (26); Alex Hartley 3/32 (20 balls) |

London Spirit won by 5 wickets
Old Trafford, Manchester
Umpires: Peter Hartley and Sue Redfern
Player of the match: Deepti Sharma (London Spirit)

- Manchester Originals won the toss and elected to bat.
- Points: London Spirit 2, Manchester Originals 0.

12 August 2021
15:30
Scorecard

| Northern Superchargers; 126/5 (100 balls) | v | Manchester Originals; 127/2 (86 balls) |
| Laura Wolvaardt 75* (51); Kate Cross 3/19 (20 balls) | | Lizelle Lee 68 (40); Kalea Moore 1/20 (15 balls) |

Manchester Originals won by 8 wickets
Headingley, Leeds
Umpires: Nigel Llong and Sue Redfern
Player of the match: Kate Cross (Manchester Originals)

- Manchester Originals won the toss and elected to field.
- Points: Manchester Originals 2, Northern Superchargers 0.

15 August 2021
15:30
Scorecard

| Trent Rockets; 122/6 (100 balls) | v | Manchester Originals; 124/1 (87 balls) |
| Sammy-Jo Johnson 33 (20); Sophie Ecclestone 2/11 (20 balls) | | Lizelle Lee 47* (45); Georgia Davis 1/9 (10 balls) |

Manchester Originals won by 9 wickets
Trent Bridge, Nottingham
Umpires: Graham Lloyd and Sue Redfern
Player of the match: Lizelle Lee (Manchester Originals)

- Manchester Originals won the toss and elected to field.
- Points: Manchester Originals 2, Trent Rockets 0.

== Standings ==
=== Women ===
| Pos | Team | Pld | W | L | T | NR | Pts | NRR |
|---|---|---|---|---|---|---|---|---|
| 1 | Southern Brave | 8 | 7 | 1 | 0 | 0 | 14 | 1.056 |
| 2 | Oval Invincibles | 8 | 4 | 3 | 0 | 1 | 9 | 0.015 |
| 3 | Birmingham Phoenix | 8 | 4 | 4 | 0 | 0 | 8 | 0.186 |
| 4 | London Spirit | 8 | 4 | 4 | 0 | 0 | 8 | 0.046 |
| 5 | Manchester Originals | 8 | 3 | 4 | 0 | 1 | 7 | 0.016 |
| 6 | Northern Superchargers | 8 | 3 | 4 | 0 | 1 | 7 | −0.041 |
| 7 | Trent Rockets | 8 | 3 | 4 | 0 | 1 | 7 | −0.293 |
| 8 | Welsh Fire | 8 | 2 | 6 | 0 | 0 | 4 | −1.017 |

Source: ESPN Cricinfo, Sky Sports

advances to the Final
advances to the Eliminator

=== Men ===
| Pos | Team | Pld | W | L | T | NR | Pts | NRR |
|---|---|---|---|---|---|---|---|---|
| 1 | Birmingham Phoenix | 8 | 6 | 2 | 0 | 0 | 12 | 1.087 |
| 2 | Southern Brave | 8 | 5 | 2 | 0 | 1 | 11 | 0.034 |
| 3 | Trent Rockets | 8 | 5 | 3 | 0 | 0 | 10 | 0.035 |
| 4 | Oval Invincibles | 8 | 4 | 3 | 0 | 1 | 9 | 0.123 |
| 5 | Northern Superchargers | 8 | 3 | 4 | 0 | 1 | 7 | 0.510 |
| 6 | Manchester Originals | 8 | 2 | 4 | 0 | 2 | 6 | −0.361 |
| 7 | Welsh Fire | 8 | 3 | 5 | 0 | 0 | 6 | −0.827 |
| 8 | London Spirit | 8 | 1 | 6 | 0 | 1 | 3 | −0.641 |

Source: ESPN Cricinfo, Sky Sports

advances to the Final
advances to the Eliminator
