= 2025 Manchester Originals season =

Manchester Originals 2025 season in The Hundred

Manchester Originals
2025 season
- Coach: Simon Katich (men); Michael Klinger (women)
- Captain: Phil Salt (men); Beth Mooney (women)
- Overseas player: Mark Chapman; Heinrich Klaasen; Noor Ahmad; Rachin Ravindra (men); Deandra Dottin; Amelia Kerr; Beth Mooney (women)
- Ground(s): Old Trafford
- The Hundred (men): TBD
- The Hundred (women): TBD

The 2025 Manchester Originals season is the franchise's fifth season competing in The Hundred. Both the men's and women's teams will compete in the tournament between 5 and 31 August 2025.

== Players ==
- **Bold** denotes players with international caps.

=== Women's side ===
No.	Name	Nationality	Date of birth (age)	Batting style	Bowling style	Notes
Batters
3	Beth Mooney	Australia	14 January 1994 (age 32)	Left-handed	Right-arm off break	Captain
7	Deandra Dottin	West Indies	21 June 1991 (age 34)	Right-handed	Right-arm fast	Overseas player
15	Amelia Kerr	New Zealand	13 October 2000 (age 25)	Right-handed	Right-arm off break	Overseas player
All-rounders
10	Lauren Winfield-Hill	England	29 September 1990 (age 35)	Right-handed	Right-arm medium	
22	Sarah Glenn	England	27 November 1999 (age 26)	Right-handed	Right-arm leg break	
Wicket-keepers
1	Amy Jones	England	13 July 1993 (age 32)	Right-handed	—	
Pace bowlers
9	Kate Cross	England	3 October 1991 (age 34)	Right-handed	Right-arm medium-fast	
19	Sophie Ecclestone	England	6 May 1999 (age 26)	Left-handed	Left-arm orthodox spin	

=== Men's side ===
No.	Name	Nationality	Date of birth (age)	Batting style	Bowling style	Notes
Batters
1	**Jos Buttler**	England	8 September 1990 (age 35)	Right-handed	Wicket-keeper	Captain
3	Phil Salt	England	28 September 1996 (age 29)	Right-handed	—	
5	**Heinrich Klaasen**	South Africa	30 July 1991 (age 34)	Right-handed	Wicket-keeper	Overseas player
All-rounders
7	Lewis Gregory	England	3 October 1991 (age 34)	Left-handed	Right-arm medium-fast	
9	Rachin Ravindra	New Zealand	23 March 1999 (age 27)	Left-handed	Right-arm off break	Overseas player
11	Mark Chapman	New Zealand	9 December 1994 (age 31)	Right-handed	Right-arm off break	Overseas player
Wicket-keepers
2	Tom Kohler-Cadmore	England	19 August 1994 (age 31)	Right-handed	Wicket-keeper	
Pace bowlers
10	Noor Ahmad	Afghanistan	3 June 2005 (age 20)	Right-handed	Right-arm leg break	Overseas player
18	Josh Tongue	England	25 December 1999 (age 26)	Right-handed	Right-arm fast-medium	
20	Scott Currie	England	10 November 2001 (age 24)	Right-handed	Right-arm fast-medium	
25	George Garton	England	24 January 1997 (age 29)	Left-handed	Left-arm fast-medium	
33	Tom Aspinwall	England	7 September 1997 (age 28)	Right-handed	Right-arm fast-medium	
55	Marchant de Lange	South Africa	21 September 1987 (age 38)	Right-handed	Right-arm fast	Overseas player

== Season overview ==
Manchester Originals will compete in the 2025 season of The Hundred with ambitions to improve on their previous campaigns. Both men's and women's teams will aim to advance to the knockout stages.

== Fixtures and results ==
=== Men's Results ===
Matches (teams)	Matches (date)	Results
Manchester Originals (Men) vs Southern Brave(Men)	Wed, 06 Aug '25	Brave won by 1 wicket (with 1 ball remaining)
Manchester Originals (Men) vs Oval Invincibles (Men)	Sat, 09 Aug '25	Invincibles won by 9 wickets (with 43 balls remaining)
Manchester Originals (Men) vs London Spirit (Men)	Mon, 11 Aug '25	Originals won by 10 runs
Welsh Fire (Men) vs Manchester Originals (Men)	Wed, 13 Aug '25	Fire won by 25 runs
Originals vs N S-Chargers	Sun, 17 Aug '25	Original won by 57 runs
Manchester Originals (Men) vs Trent Rockets (Men)	Tue, 19 Aug '25	Rockets won by 7 wickets (with 26 balls remaining)
Manchester Originals (Men) vs Birmingham Phoenix (Men)	Sun, 24 Aug '25	Phoenix won by 7 wickets (with 17 balls remaining)
N S-Chargers vs Originals	Tue, 26 Aug '25	Originals won by 7 wickets (with 16 balls remaining)

=== Women's Results ===
Matches (teams)	Matches (date)	Results
Originals (Women) vs Brave (Women)	Wed, 06 Aug '25	Brave won by 6 wickets (with 11 balls remaining)
Originals (Women) vs Invincibles (Women)	Sat, 09 Aug '25	Originals won by 2 runs
Originals (Women) vs Spirit (Women)	Mon, 11 Aug '25	Spirit won by 3 wickets (with 2 balls remaining)
Originals (Women) vs Fire (Women)	Wed, 13 Aug '25	Originals won by 7 wickets (with 19 balls remaining)
Originals (Women) vs N S-Chargers (Women)	Sun, 17 Aug '25	Originals won by 5 runs
Originals (Women) vs Rockets (Women)	Tue, 19 Aug '25	Originals won by 10 wickets (with 18 balls remaining)
Originals (Women) vs Phoenix (Women)	Sun, 24 Aug '25	Phoenix won by 16 runs
Originals (Women) vs N S-Chargers (Women)	Tue, 26 Aug '25	N S-Chargers won by 8 wickets (with 35 balls remaining)
