= Calvin Harrison (cricketer) =

South African-born English cricketer (born 1998)

Personal information
- Full name: Calvin Grant Harrison
- Born: 29 April 1998 (age 28); Durban, KwaZulu-Natal, South Africa
- Height: 6 ft 4 in (1.93 m)
- Batting: Right-handed
- Bowling: Right-arm leg break
- Role: All-rounder

Domestic team information
- Years: Team
- 2019: Oxford MCCU
- 2020: Hampshire
- 2021–2025: Nottinghamshire (squad no. 31)
- 2021–2023: Manchester Originals
- 2024–2026: Trent Rockets
- 2025: → Northamptonshire (on loan)
- 2026–present: Northamptonshire (squad no. 30)

Career statistics
Competition	FC	LA	T20
Matches	45	10	102
Runs scored	1,626	128	416
Batting average	26.65	16.00	11.88
100s/50s	3/5	0/0	0/0
Top score	153	41	30
Balls bowled	7,012	445	1,738
Wickets	108	10	104
Bowling average	35.63	39.70	21.45
5 wickets in innings	2	0	2
10 wickets in match	1	0	0
Best bowling	7/119	3/37	5/9
Catches/stumpings	71/–	7/–	66/–
- Source: Cricinfo, 5 November 2026

Calvin Grant Harrison (born 29 April 1998) is a South African-born English cricketer.

== Biography ==
Harrison was born at Durban and was educated in England at King's College, Taunton. From King's he went up to Oxford Brookes University. While studying at Oxford Brookes, he made two appearances in first-class cricket for Oxford MCCU in 2019, playing against Middlesex and Hampshire. (Note: Oxford MCCU differed from Oxford University Cricket Club in that it was open to students at Oxford Brookes University, whereas Oxford University Cricket Club is exclusively for students of the constituent colleges of the University of Oxford.) He scored 65 runs in his two matches, with a high score of 37 not out. With his leg break and googly bowling, he took three wickets with best figures of one for 30. He made his Twenty20 debut on 10 September 2020, for Hampshire in the 2020 T20 Blast.

On 8 June 2021, Harrison signed for Nottinghamshire on a three-month contract. A month later this was extended to a two-year deal. In April 2022, he was bought by the Manchester Originals for the 2022 season of The Hundred.

Harrison made his First Class debut for Nottinghamshire against Essex in May 2023 and penned a further three-year contract with the club in July that year. He joined Northamptonshire on a two-match loan in April 2025. On his Northamptonshire debut against Lancashire at Old Trafford in Manchester, he took 10 wickets in a match for the first time, bagging 11 for 153 including a to-date career best of 7 for 119 in the second innings. Having extended his loan agreement, Harrison made his maiden first-class century for Northamptonshire against Kent at the Spitfire Ground in Canterbury on 1 July 2025, scoring 122. In October 2025, he joined Northamptonshire on a permanent basis, signing a two-year contract.

In January 2026, Harrison was named in the England Lions squad for a white-ball series against the Pakistan Shaheens to take place the following month in the United Arab Emirates. He made his debut for the team on 27 February 2026, taking 3/37 off 10 overs as they won the first 50-over match by nine wickets.

Batting at number three, Harrison made his second first-class century, and highest career score to-date, when he compiled 153 for Northamptonshire against Kent at the County Ground in Northampton in an innings spread over 10 and 11 April 2026.

Harrison agreed a three-year contract extension with Northamptonshire in July 2026, tying him into the club until at least the end of the 2029 season.

He was named in the England Lions squad for a T20 series against West Indies A in Saint Kitts and Nevis in November 2026. Harrison took seven wickets from 12 overs at an average of 9.85 across the three matches, passing 100 career T20 wickets in the process.
