= Mitchell Stanley =

English cricketer (born 2001)

Personal information
- Full name: Mitchell Terry Stanley
- Born: 17 March 2001 (age 25); Telford, Shropshire, England
- Batting: Right-handed
- Bowling: Right-arm fast
- Role: Bowler

Domestic team information
- Years: Team
- 2022–2023: Worcestershire (squad no. 38)
- 2022: Manchester Originals
- 2024–present: Lancashire (squad no. 38)
- FC debut: 22 June 2025 Lancashire v Kent
- LA debut: 2 August 2024 Lancashire v Somerset

Career statistics
Competition	FC	LA	T20
Matches	11	8	21
Runs scored	108	7	11
Batting average	6.35	7.00	3.66
100s/50s	0/0	0/0	0/0
Top score	20	5*	7
Balls bowled	1,679	384	324
Wickets	41	6	19
Bowling average	29.26	59.83	27.94
5 wickets in innings	3	0	0
10 wickets in match	1	0	0
Best bowling	6/100	3/43	4/30
Catches/stumpings	7/–	2/–	2/–
- Source: Cricinfo, 27 September 2026

Mitchell Terry Stanley (born 17 March 2001) is an English cricketer who plays for Lancashire.

== Career ==
In November 2019, at the age of 18, Stanley signed his first professional contract for Worcestershire, having previously represented the county's Second XI and Shropshire age group sides, after being spotted at a fast bowling programme. He extended his contract in December 2020, before signing his first full-time professional contract in September 2021, despite a side injury restricting him to eleven Second XI fixtures in 2021, with Alan Richardson describing him as a first team player for the future.

Stanley made his Worcestershire debut against Leicestershire County Cricket Club in the 2022 T20 Blast on 17 June 2022, taking a wicket on debut. He featured in a further six games for Worcestershire in the 2022 T20 Blast season, finishing with best figures of 2/24 against Birmingham where he took two wickets in the first two legitimate deliveries of the match. His performances in the tournament earned praise from overseas player and stand-in captain Colin Munro.

In August 2022, Stanley earned a call-up to the Manchester Originals side for the 2022 season of The Hundred as a replacement player for Daniel Worrall.

He signed for Lancashire County Cricket Club on a one-year deal in September 2023.

Stanley was included in the England Lions squad to tour Australia in January 2025.

In June 2025, he agreed a new contract to stay at Lancashire until at least the end of the 2026 season. In July 2026, Stanley further extended his time at Lancashire by agreeing a two-year contract extension through to the end of the 2028 season.
