= Tom Lammonby =

English cricketer (born 2000)

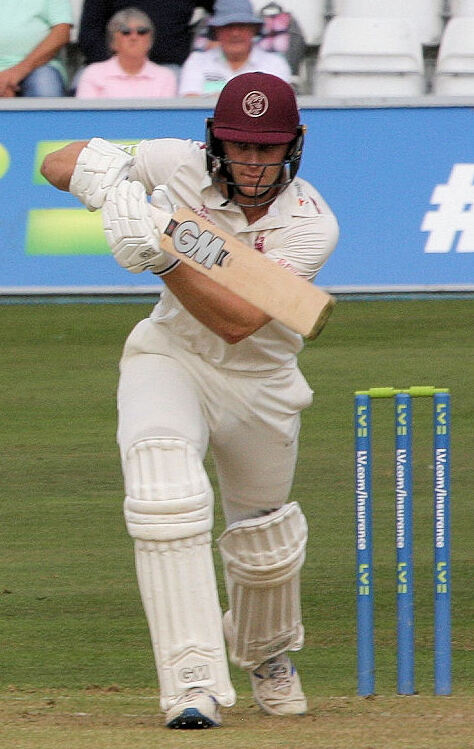
- Lammonby batting in 2021

Personal information
- Full name: Thomas Alexander Lammonby
- Born: 2 June 2000 (age 26); Exeter, Devon, England
- Batting: Left-handed
- Bowling: Left-arm medium-fast
- Role: Batting all-rounder
- Relatives: Ryan Campbell (cousin)

Domestic team information
- Years: Team
- 2019–present: Somerset (squad no. 15)
- 2021–2023: Manchester Originals
- 2021/22: Hobart Hurricanes
- 2022: Karachi Kings
- 2024: Oval Invincibles
- First-class debut: 1 August 2020 Somerset v Glamorgan
- List A debut: 21 February 2023 England Lions v Sri Lanka A

Career statistics
Competition	FC	LA	T20
Matches	87	19	86
Runs scored	4,820	943	1,007
Batting average	33.94	49.63	19.00
100s/50s	10/22	3/5	0/1
Top score	229	114	90
Balls bowled	1,478	443	317
Wickets	20	16	15
Bowling average	43.55	26.25	32.60
5 wickets in innings	0	1	0
10 wickets in match	0	0	0
Best bowling	3/26	5/20	2/32
Catches/stumpings	56/–	8/–	48/–
- Source: Cricinfo, 27 September 2026

Thomas Alexander Lammonby (born 2 June 2000) is an English cricketer who plays for Somerset.

== Early life and education ==
Lammonby was born on 2 June 2000 in Exeter. His cousin, Ryan Campbell, is an Australian former cricketer. Lammonby was educated at Exeter School.

== Career ==
Prior to his T20 debut, Lammonby was named in England's squad for the 2018 Under-19 Cricket World Cup. However, he was ruled out of the tournament after breaking his hand.

On 20 July 2019, he made his Twenty20 debut in the 2019 T20 Blast.

Lammonby made his first-class debut on 1 August 2020, for Somerset in the 2020 Bob Willis Trophy. Lammonby scored his maiden century in his fourth first-class match, against Gloucestershire at Taunton. He followed it up with centuries against Worcestershire and, in the Bob Willis Trophy final, Essex.

In the 2021 T20 Blast, Lammonby scored a "freewheeling" 90 runs off only 36 balls to help Somerset to a 23-run win over Gloucestershire. In December 2021, Lammonby was picked up by the Hobart Hurricanes after playing grade cricket in Sydney.

In April 2022, he was bought by the Manchester Originals for the 2022 season of The Hundred.

Lammonby signed a new three-year contract with Somerset in May 2025.
