= Tom Aspinwall =

English cricketer

Personal information
- Full name: Thomas Henry Aspinwall
- Born: 13 March 2004 (age 22); Lancaster, Lancashire, England
- Batting: Right-handed
- Bowling: Right-arm medium
- Role: All-rounder

Domestic team information
- Years: Team
- 2023–present: Lancashire (squad no. 13)
- 2024–2025: Manchester Originals
- First-class debut: 5 April 2024 Lancashire v Surrey
- List A debut: 1 August 2023 Lancashire v Essex

Career statistics
Competition	FC	LA	T20
Matches	11	16	25
Runs scored	109	119	50
Batting average	12.11	14.87	10.00
100s/50s	0/0	0/0	0/0
Top score	26*	47	18*
Balls bowled	1,132	668	417
Wickets	26	19	26
Bowling average	32.46	34.26	23.46
5 wickets in innings	1	0	0
10 wickets in match	0	0	0
Best bowling	5/41	4/42	4/18
Catches/stumpings	2/–	2/–	3/–
- Source: CricInfo, 27 September 2026

Thomas Henry Aspinwall (born 13 March 2004) is an English cricketer who plays for Lancashire County Cricket Club. He is a right-handed batsman and a right-arm medium pace bowler. He made his List-A cricket debut for Lancashire against Essex on 1 August 2023.

== Early life ==
From Cumbria, Aspinwall was educated at Sedbergh School and started playing cricket as a youngster in Kendal.

== Career ==
He signed a rookie contract with Lancashire in September 2022. He had a breakthrough season in 2023 for Lancashire Lightning featuring for the county in the 2023 One-Day Cup. He took his best bowling figures against Middlesex when he returned figures of 4/52 on 20 August 2023. He also top scored for Lightning in the quarter-final as he hit 47 to help his side into the semi-finals. He made his first-class debut for Lancashire on 5 April 2024, against Surrey in the 2024 County Championship.

== International career ==
Aspinwall featured for the England under-19 team that reached the final of the 2022 Under-19 Cricket World Cup.
