= Max Holden (cricketer) =

English cricketer (born 1997)

Personal information
- Full name: Max David Edward Holden
- Born: 18 December 1997 (age 28); Cambridge, Cambridgeshire, England
- Batting: Left-handed
- Bowling: Right-arm off break
- Role: Batsman

Domestic team information
- Years: Team
- 2016–present: Middlesex (squad no. 4)
- 2017: → Northamptonshire (on loan)
- 2023–2024, 2026: Manchester Super Giants
- 2024: Dubai Capitals
- 2025–2025/26: Desert Vipers
- 2025: Trent Rockets
- First-class debut: 2 April 2017 Northamptonshire v Loughborough MCCU
- List A debut: 12 May 2017 Northamptonshire v Leicestershire

Career statistics
Competition	FC	LA	T20
Matches	121	26	127
Runs scored	6,408	915	2,980
Batting average	32.20	41.59	27.33
100s/50s	10/30	1/6	2/16
Top score	211*	166	121*
Balls bowled	642	126	6
Wickets	5	1	0
Bowling average	92.00	104.00	–
5 wickets in innings	0	0	–
10 wickets in match	0	0	–
Best bowling	2/59	1/29	–
Catches/stumpings	40/–	9/–	41/–
- Source: ESPNcricinfo, 27 September 2026

Max David Edward Holden (born 18 December 1997) is an English cricketer who plays for Middlesex.

== Domestic career ==
=== Middlesex ===
Born in Cambridge, Holden progressed through the Middlesex youth system, signing a four year professional contract in September 2015. In January 2017, Holden was loaned out to Northamptonshire, where he made his first-class debut on 2 April 2017 against Loughborough MCCU as part of the Marylebone Cricket Club University fixtures. He subsequently made his List A debut for Northamptonshire in the 2017 Royal London One-Day Cup on 12 May 2017.

Upon returning to Middlesex, Holden made his first-class debut for the club against Hampshire in September 2017, before signing a contract extension until 2020. He made his Twenty20 debut in the 2018 t20 Blast on 6 July 2018. On 27 August 2020, in the opening match of the 2020 t20 Blast, Holden scored his first century in a T20 match, with an unbeaten 102 runs from 60 balls. He bettered this score on 16 June 2023, with an unbeaten 121 runs from 59 balls against Kent at Lord's Cricket Ground; as of 2025 this remains the highest score in a T20 match at Lord's. In February 2025, Holden signed a new contract with Middlesex to run until the end of the 2027 season.

=== Franchise cricket ===
Holden was signed by Manchester Originals ahead of the 2023 edition of The Hundred. He was part of the Originals side that reached the 2023 final. In the 2025 draft, Holden was selected to join Trent Rockets.

He played for Dubai Capitals in the 2024 International League T20, before joining the Desert Vipers ahead of the 2025 edition of the tournament.

== International career ==
Prior to his first-class debut, Holden was part of England's squad for the 2016 Under-19 Cricket World Cup in Bangladesh. Following the tournament, he was appointed as the captain of the England under-19 cricket team for two four-day matches and a one-day series against Sri Lanka in July 2016, and a four-day series against India in July 2017.

In May 2025, Holden was called up to the England Lions side for two four-day matches against India A.
