= Paul Walter =

English cricketer

Personal information
- Full name: Paul Ian Walter
- Born: 28 May 1994 (age 32); Billericay, Essex, England
- Nickname: Tall Paul
- Height: 201 cm (6 ft 7 in)
- Batting: Left-handed
- Bowling: Left-arm medium-fast
- Role: All rounder

Domestic team information
- Years: Team
- 2016–present: Essex (squad no. 22)
- 2022–2024, 2026–present: Manchester Originals
- 2023/24–2024/25: Brisbane Heat
- 2024: Peshawar Zalmi
- 2025: Welsh Fire
- First-class debut: 13 August 2016 Essex v Derbyshire
- List A debut: 10 May 2017 Essex v Sussex

Career statistics
Competition	FC	LA	T20
Matches	79	17	192
Runs scored	3,884	298	3,075
Batting average	35.63	27.09	22.12
100s/50s	7/17	0/1	0/14
Top score	158	50	80
Balls bowled	2,068	386	2,097
Wickets	31	14	118
Bowling average	39.80	32.92	27.62
5 wickets in innings	0	0	0
10 wickets in match	0	0	0
Best bowling	3/20	4/37	3/20
Catches/stumpings	50/–	8/–	94/–
- Source: CricketArchive, 27 September 2026

Paul Ian Walter (born 28 May 1994) is an English cricketer who plays for Essex County Cricket Club. He is a left-handed all-rounder who bowls left-arm medium-fast. He made his Twenty20 debut for Essex, on 24 June 2016, against Hampshire. He made his List A debut for Essex in the 2017 Royal London One-Day Cup on 10 May 2017.

Originally taking his place in the Essex team mostly as bowler, and batting at number 10 on his first-class debut, Walter later was picked as a number three batsman and even as an opener in limited-overs cricket. In the 2021 season he found a regular place in the middle-order for Essex in the County Championship, being notable for his consistency. He maintains an average of around 40. On the other hand his bowling was rarely used.

He started the 2022 season in the second XI with new signing Matt Critchley taking his spot in the middle order. Returning to the first team after injury to Dan Lawrence, he made 93 against Northants to help save the match and secure his place in the side. In May 2022, in the 2022 County Championship, Walter scored his maiden century in first-class cricket, with 141 against Yorkshire.

Walter signed with the Brisbane Heat for BBL13, where he quickly became a cult hero, making key contributions with bat and ball in a number of games, notably winning the Player of the Match Award in wins against the Melbourne Renegades and Sydney Sixers.

Walter played in the final against the Sixers, as the Heat took out the title for the first time since BBL02, becoming only the third team to win the title on multiple occasions, after the Sixers and Perth Scorchers.

Walter took 17 wickets in his 11 matches, with only his teammates Xavier Bartlett (20) and Spencer Johnson (19) having taken more wickets in the tournament.

Walter's return to Brisbane for BBL14 was less successful, having been dropped after making five appearances, taking just two wickets and going at an economy rate of greater than 10 runs per over.

During the eliminator of the 2026 Men's 100, Walter recorded his highest score in the 100 ball format, hitting 80 runs in 46 balls, with 3 fours and 8 sixes for the Manchester Super Giants against the Sunrisers Leeds.
