= Manchester Super Giants =

100-ball cricket team in Manchester, England

Personnel
- Captain: Meg Lanning (women); Aiden Markram (men)
- Coach: Matthew Mott (women); Justin Langer (men)
- Overseas players: Maitlan Brown; Richa Ghosh; Meg Lanning; Smriti Mandhana; (women); Michael Bracewell; Heinrich Klaasen; Aiden Markram; Noor Ahmad; Tim Seifert; (men)
- Owner: RP-Sanjiv Goenka Group (70%); Lancashire County Cricket Club (30%)

Team information
- Colours
- Founded: 2019; 7 years ago
- Home ground: Old Trafford
- Capacity: 19,000

History
- No. of titles: 1
- Men's title wins: 1 (2026)
- Official website: manchestersupergiants.co.uk
The Hundred kit

Manchester Super Giants, formerly known as Manchester Originals, are a franchise 100-ball cricket team based in the city of Manchester. The team represents Lancashire in the newly founded The Hundred competition, beginning in the 2021 season, and playing at Old Trafford.

== History ==
In May 2019, the England and Wales Cricket Board had applied for trademarks for six of the eight Hundred franchises, with those based at The Oval and Old Trafford the only absentees. It was not until June that the name Manchester Originals was confirmed, as was the fact that the franchise would represent just one county, Lancashire. Other names had been rumoured in the press, including Manchester Storm and Manchester Bees, as well as a name featuring "Lancashire" amid fears that a Manchester team would alienate fans from outside of the city.

The Originals' alignment with just one county allowed them to avoid early pressure to select as many players from affiliated counties as possible, but Lancashire chief executive Daniel Gidney argued this would prove a handicap, as the other franchises would enjoy greater marketing powers and better coaching resources.

In July 2019 the team announced that former Lancashire and Australia batsman Simon Katich would be the team's first coach. Katich most recently coached Caribbean Premier League winners Trinbago Knight Riders and Royal Challengers Bangalore in the Indian Premier League. He is joined by Lancashire head coach Glen Chapple and assistant coach Mark Chilton.

The inaugural Hundred draft took place in October 2019 and with the Originals having claimed Jos Buttler as their England centrally-contracted player, and Kate Cross and Sophie Ecclestone the women's players, they were looking to build on their early picks. They were also joined by England internationals Matt Parkinson and Saqib Mahmood as local icon picks (players from their director county Lancashire).

As part of the 2025 Hundred sale, the ECB gave Lancashire County Cricket Club a 51% stake in the franchise with the remaining 49% sold in an auction process. Lancashire County Cricket Club opted to sell 21% of their stake with RP-Sanjiv Goenka Group acquiring 70% of the franchise. They took operational control on 1 October 2025. The franchise was renamed ahead of the 2026 The Hundred season.

Captain Aiden Markram left the men's side for personal reasons after five games, with Michael Bracewell being signed as a replacement and Jos Buttler replacing him as captain. The men's side finished 2nd in the table with 20 points qualifying for the Eliminator. They beat Sunrisers Leeds by 20 runs at the Oval to qualify for a place in the Final. In the final they beat the Trent Rockets by five wickets to win their inaugural title, with Tim Seifert scoring 72 runs in their winning chase. The women's side also had their best ever finish in the 2026 edition of the competition, finishing fourth.

Logo and kits 2019–2025
kit

== Honours ==
=== Men's honours ===
The Hundred

- Winners: 2026
- Runners-up: 2022, 2023

=== Women's honours ===
The Hundred

- 4th place: 2026 (highest finish)

== Ground ==
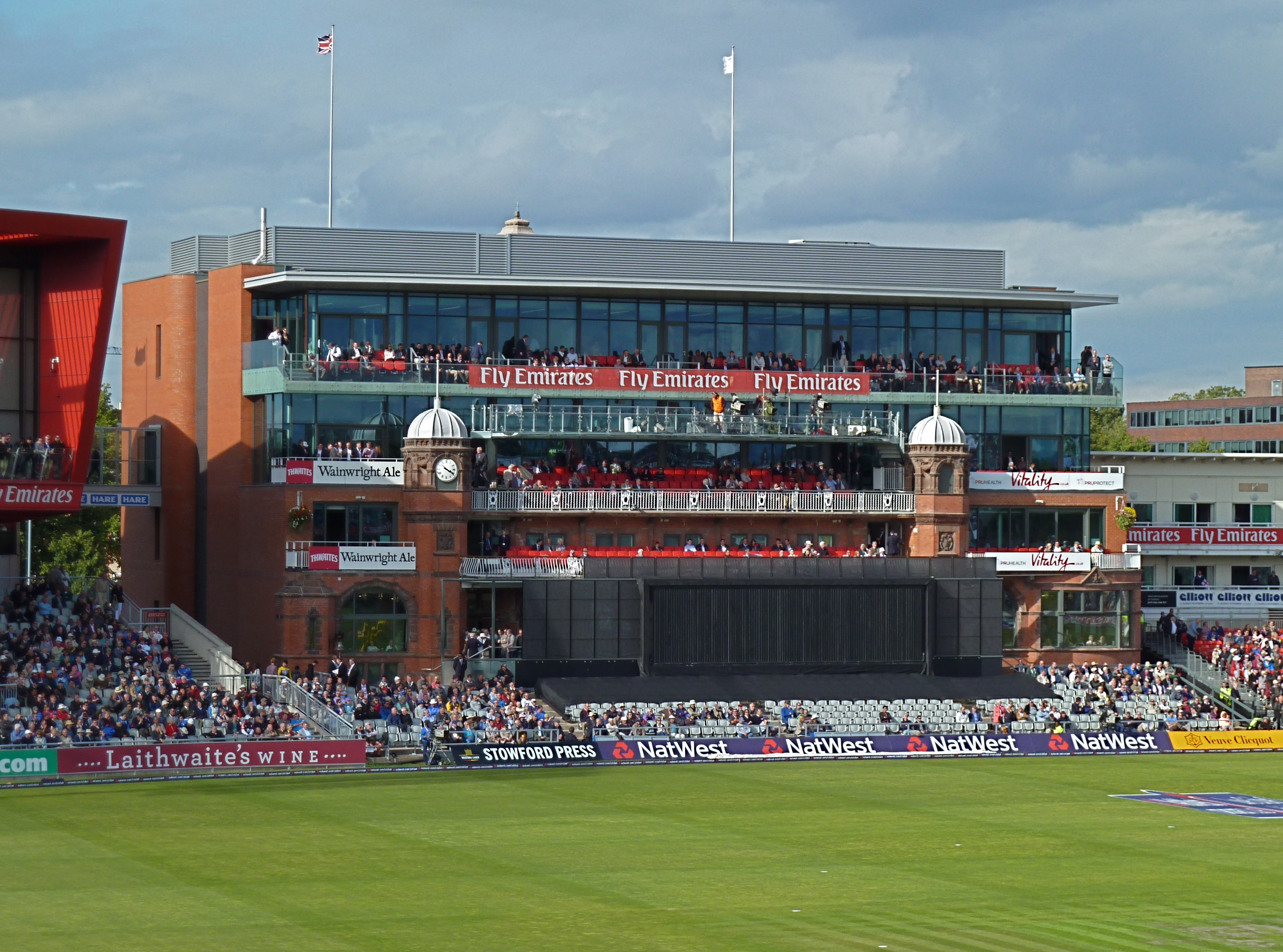
Old Trafford's Pavilion

The Originals play at the home of Lancashire Cricket Club, Old Trafford Cricket Ground, to the south of Manchester. The women's team had been due to also use Sedbergh School in Sedbergh, Cumbria for some matches but this plan was abandoned when both teams were brought together at the same ground as a result of the COVID-19 pandemic.

== Current squads ==
- **Bold** denotes players with international caps.
- * denotes a player who is unavailable for rest of the season.

=== Women's team ===
No.	Name	Nationality	Date of birth (age)	Batting style	Bowling style	Notes
Batters
7	**Meg Lanning**	Australia	25 March 1992 (age 34)	Right-handed	Right-arm medium	Captain; Overseas player
8	**Paige Scholfield**	England	19 December 1995 (age 30)	Right-handed	Right-arm medium	
10	Grace Scrivens	England	10 November 2003 (age 23)	Left-handed	Right-arm off break	
14	Jo Gardner	England	25 March 1997 (age 29)	Right-handed	Right-arm off break	
18	**Smriti Mandhana**	India	18 July 1996 (age 30)	Left-handed	Right-arm medium	Overseas player
All-rounders
17	**Kathryn Bryce**	Scotland	17 November 1997 (age 28)	Right-handed	Right-arm medium	
29	**Ryana MacDonald-Gay**	England	12 February 2004 (age 22)	Right-handed	Right-arm medium	
Wicket-keepers
13	**Richa Ghosh**	India	28 September 2003 (age 23)	Right-handed	—	Overseas player
—	Mia Rogers	England	29 January 2002 (age 24)	Right-handed	—	Wildcard player
—	Nat Wraith	England	3 October 2001 (age 25)	Right-handed	—	
Pace bowlers
1	Grace Ballinger	England	3 April 2002 (age 24)	Left-handed	Left-arm medium	
88	Maitlan Brown	Australia	5 June 1997 (age 29)	Right-handed	Right-arm fast-medium	Overseas player
—	**Beth Langston**	England	6 September 1992 (age 34)	Right-handed	Right-arm medium	Wildcard player
Spin bowlers
19	**Sophie Ecclestone**	England	6 May 1999 (age 27)	Right-handed	Slow left-arm orthodox	England central contract
22	**Mady Villiers**	England	26 August 1998 (age 28)	Right-handed	Right-arm off break	
35	Bex Tyson	England	26 June 2000 (age 26)	Left-handed	Slow left-arm orthodox	

=== Men's team ===
No.	Name	Nationality	Date of birth (age)	Batting style	Bowling style	Notes
Batters
14	Tawanda Muyeye	Zimbabwe	5 March 2001 (age 25)	Right-handed	Right-arm off break	Domestic player
45	**Heinrich Klaasen**	South Africa	30 July 1991 (age 35)	Right-handed	Right-arm off break	Overseas player
76	Leus du Plooy	South Africa	12 January 1995 (age 31)	Left-handed	Slow left-arm orthodox	Hungarian passport
94	**Aiden Markram**	South Africa	4 October 1994 (age 32)	Right-handed	Right-arm off break	Captain; Overseas player; Ruled out
—	Max Holden	England	18 December 1997 (age 28)	Left-handed	Right-arm off break	
All-rounders
5	James Sales	England	11 February 2003 (age 23)	Right-handed	Right-arm fast-medium	Wildcard player
6	**Michael Bracewell**	New Zealand	14 February 1991 (age 35)	Left-handed	Right-arm off break	Overseas player; Replacement player
8	**Liam Dawson**	England	1 March 1990 (age 36)	Right-handed	Slow left-arm orthodox	England central contract
22	Paul Walter	England	28 May 1994 (age 32)	Left-handed	Left-arm medium	
Wicket-keepers
23	Tom Moores	England	4 September 1996 (age 30)	Left-handed	—	
43	**Tim Seifert**	New Zealand	14 December 1994 (age 31)	Right-handed	—	Overseas player
63	**Jos Buttler**	England	8 September 1990 (age 36)	Right-handed	—	England central contract
Pace bowlers
24	**Josh Tongue**	England	15 November 1997 (age 29)	Right-handed	Right-arm fast-medium	England central contract
37	**Gus Atkinson**	England	19 January 1998 (age 28)	Right-handed	Right-arm fast-medium	England central contract
61	Adam Finch	England	28 May 2000 (age 26)	Right-handed	Right-arm fast-medium	Wildcard player
95	**Sonny Baker**	England	13 March 2003 (age 23)	Right-handed	Right-arm fast	
—	**George Scrimshaw**	England	10 February 1998 (age 28)	Right-handed	Right-arm fast	
Spin Bowlers
2	**Tom Hartley**	England	5 May 1999 (age 27)	Left-handed	Slow left-arm orthodox	
15	**Noor Ahmad**	Afghanistan	3 January 2005 (age 21)	Right-handed	Slow left-arm unorthodox	Overseas player

== Seasons ==
=== Women's team ===
Season	Group stage							Playoff stage		Ref.
Season	Pld	W	L	T	NR	Pts	Pos	Pld	Pos	Ref.
2021	8	3	4	0	1	7	5th	Did not progress		
2022	6	2	4	0	0	4	6th	Did not progress		
2023	8	2	4	0	2	6	7th	Did not progress		
2024	8	3	4	0	1	7	6th	Did not progress		
2025	8	4	4	0	0	16	5th	Did not progress		
2026	8	4	3	0	1	18	4th	Did not progress		

=== Men's team ===
Season	Group stage							Playoff stage		Ref.
Season	Pld	W	L	T	NR	Pts	Pos	Pld	Pos	Ref.
2021	8	2	4	0	2	6	6th	Did not progress		
2022	8	5	3	0	0	10	2nd	2 (Note: Manchester Originals men qualified for the eliminator in 2022. They played two matches, winning the playoff for the final against London Spirit by 5 wickets, losing in the final to Trent Rockets by 2 wickets.)	2nd	
2023	8	4	3	0	1	10	2nd	2 (Note: Manchester Originals men qualified for the eliminator in 2023. They played two matches, winning the playoff for the final against Southern Brave by 7 wickets, losing in the final to Oval Invincibles by 14 runs.)	2nd	
2024	8	1	7	0	0	2	7th	Did not progress		
2025	8	3	5	0	0	12	6th	Did not progress		
2026	8	5	3	0	0	20	2nd	2 (Note: Manchester Super Giants men qualified for the eliminator in 2026. They played two matches, winning the playoff for the final against Sunrisers Leeds by 20 runs, and winning the final against Trent Rockets by 5 wickets.)	1st	

== See also ==
- List of Manchester Super Giants cricketers
- List of cricket grounds in England and Wales
- List of Test cricket grounds
