= Tom Hartley (cricketer) =

English cricketer (born 1999)

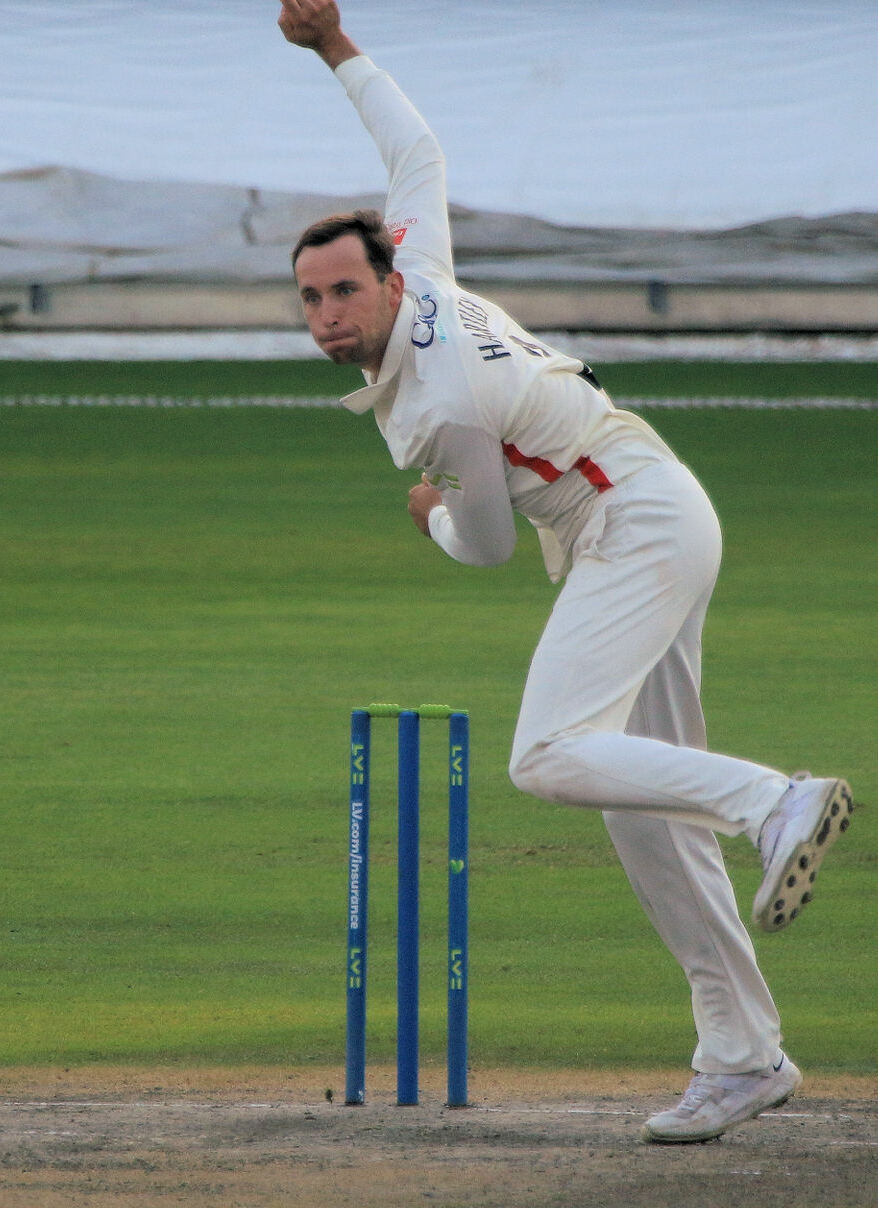
- Hartley in 2022

Personal information
- Full name: Tom William Hartley
- Born: 3 May 1999 (age 27); Ormskirk, Lancashire, England
- Height: 6 ft 4 in (193 cm)
- Batting: Left-handed
- Bowling: Slow left-arm orthodox
- Role: Bowler

International information
- National side: England (2023–2024)
- Test debut (cap 712): 25 January 2024 v India
- Last Test: 7 March 2024 v India
- ODI debut (cap 272): 23 September 2023 v Ireland
- Last ODI: 26 September 2023 v Ireland
- ODI shirt no.: 79

Domestic team information
- Years: Team
- 2020–present: Lancashire (squad no. 2)
- 2021–2025: Manchester Originals

Career statistics
Competition	Test	ODI	FC	LA
Matches	5	2	45	5
Runs scored	185	12	1,347	60
Batting average	18.50	–	22.83	30.00
100s/50s	0/0	0/0	1/4	0/0
Top score	36	12*	130	23
Balls bowled	1,504	60	8,202	223
Wickets	22	0	102	1
Bowling average	36.13	–	38.52	215.00
5 wickets in innings	1	0	4	0
10 wickets in match	0	–	1	0
Best bowling	7/62	–	7/62	1/46
Catches/stumpings	2/–	0/–	22/–	0/–
- Source: Cricinfo, 21 June 2026

Tom William Hartley (born 3 May 1999) is an English cricketer who plays for Lancashire and the England national team. In 2024, on his Test Cricket debut against India he took nine wickets, two in the first innings, seven in the second.

== Domestic career ==
He made his first-class debut on 1 August 2020, for Lancashire in the 2020 Bob Willis Trophy. He made his Twenty20 debut on 27 August 2020, for Lancashire in the 2020 t20 Blast. In April 2022, he was bought by the Manchester Originals for the 2022 season of The Hundred. He bowled the first ever delivery in the history of the men's Hundred in the first edition of the tournament in 2021.

== International career ==
He made his ODI debut for England against Ireland in September 2023. Hartley was selected to play for England in their five match test series against India in January 2024. The decision to select him as one of the frontline spinners for the tour raised eyebrows of many as it ended up as a surprising choice. Prior to his call-up, he participated in an England Lions training camp in Abu Dhabi and the training camp was meant to handpick spin bowling options for England at test level. However, his stint with England Lions was cut short when he was named in England's ODI squad to face West Indies in December 2023.

He made his test debut against India in the first test of the five match test series at Hyderabad in January 2024. While he took only two wickets in the first innings of his debut test, he picked up his maiden five-wicket haul during the second innings where he eventually took seven wickets. The seven second-innings wickets were the best by an England spinner on debut since Jim Laker in 1948.

In May 2024, he was named in England's squad for the 2024 ICC Men's T20 World Cup tournament.

Hartley was included in the England Lions squad to tour Australia in January 2025, but later withdrew after fracturing a hand during practice.

== Personal life ==
His father is former international runner Bill Hartley who won a 4 × 400 m gold medal at the 1974 European Athletics Championships.

He attended Merchant Taylors' Boys' School in Crosby, Merseyside.

He is an Everton F.C. fan.
