= List of Buckinghamshire County Cricket Club List A players =

Buckinghamshire County Cricket Club was formed in 1891, and first competed in the Minor Counties Championship in 1896. They have appeared in thirty-two List A matches, making nine Gillette Cup, fourteen NatWest Trophy and nine Cheltenham & Gloucester Trophy appearances. The players in this list have all played at least one List A match. Buckinghamshire cricketers who have not represented the county in List A cricket are excluded from the list.

Players are listed in order of appearance, where players made their debut in the same match, they are ordered by batting order. Players in bold have played first-class cricket.

== Key ==
**General**

- ♠ – Captain
- † – Wicket-keeper
- **First** – Year of debut for Buckinghamshire
- **Last** – Year of latest match played for Buckinghamshire
- **Mat** – Number of matches played for Buckinghamshire
- **Win%** – Winning percentage

**Batting**

- **Inn** – Number of innings batted
- **NO** – Number of innings not out
- **Runs** – Runs scored in career
- **HS** – Highest score
- **100** – Centuries scored
- **50** – Half-centuries scored
- **Avg** – Runs scored per dismissal
- * – Batsman remained not out

**Bowling**

- **Balls** – Balls bowled in career
- **Wkt** – Wickets taken in career
- **BBI** – Best bowling in an innings
- **BBM** – Best bowling in a match
- **Ave** – Average runs per wicket

**Fielding**

- **Ca** – Catches taken
- **St** – Stumpings effected

== List of players ==
No.	Name	Nationality	First	Last	Mat	Runs	HS	Avg	Balls	Wkt	BBI	Ave	Ca	St
No.	Name	Nationality	First	Last	Mat	Batting			Bowling				Fielding	
1	**Colin Lever**	England	1965	1975	8	69	20	11.50	468	7	3/19	43.00	2	0
2	Norman Butler	England	1965	1965	1	5	5	5.00	0	0	–	–	0	0
3	**Bill Atkins**	England	1965	1970	3	16	16	8.00	0	0	–	–	0	0
4	**David Johns**	England	1965	1965	1	19	19	19.00	0	0	–	–	0	0
5	Lionel Hitchings †	England	1965	1965	1	3	3	3.00	0	0	–	–	1	0
6	David Janes	England	1965	1972	4	135	95	33.75	0	0	–	–	3	0
7	**Peter Stoddart** ♠	England	1965	1965	1	0	0	0.00	0	0	–	–	0	0
8	Frederick Harris	England	1965	1975	7	30	13	6.00	456	11	4/21	19.45	0	0
9	**Anthony Waite**	England	1965	1970	4	8	8	8.00	252	2	1/46	81.50	1	0
10	**Christopher Pickett**	England	1965	1970	4	10	5	5.00	276	7	4/20	22.28	3	0
11	Colin Smith	England	1965	1965	1	0	0	0.00	60	3	3/32	10.66	0	0
12	**John Turner**	England	1969	1979	8	254	88	31.75	0	0	–	–	4	0
13	**Clive Leach**	England	1969	1970	3	48	39*	24.00	0	0	–	–	1	0
14	**Keith McAdam**	Scotland	1969	1969	1	1	1	1.00	0	0	–	–	0	0
15	**John Slack** ♠	England	1969	1969	1	6	6	6.00	0	0	–	–	1	0
16	Brian Poll ♠†	England	1969	1979	8	69	23	17.25	0	0	–	–	6	1
17	**Raymond Bond**	England	1969	1979	5	20	9	10.00	330	10	5/17	14.60	2	0
18	Thomas Hickling	England	1970	1970	2	2	2	1.00	0	0	–	–	1	0
19	**Ronald Hooker**	England	1970	1975	6	152	65	38.00	271	4	2/30	46.25	2	0
20	Christopher Parry ♠	England	1970	1972	4	10	10	5.00	90	4	3/61	21.75	0	0
21	Gwynne Jones	England	1972	1979	4	59	47	14.75	138	3	1/3	29.00	1	0
22	Keith Edwards	England	1972	1979	5	81	39*	20.25	0	0	–	–	1	0
23	Willie Williams	England	1972	1972	1	0	0	0.00	0	0	–	–	0	0
24	**David Mackintosh** ♠	Scotland	1972	1975	3	26	14	8.66	0	0	–	–	2	0
25	**Laurence Champniss**	England	1972	1974	2	0	0	0.00	144	2	1/32	42.50	0	0
26	**Ray Hutchison**	New Zealand	1974	1975	2	33	26*	33.00	36	1	1/46	46.00	0	0
27	David Smith ♠	England	1974	1987	6	112	54	22.40	3	0	–	–	3	0
28	Stuart York	England	1975	1975	1	73	73*	–	0	0	–	–	0	0
29	**Raymond Bailey**	England	1975	1979	2	13	13	13.00	120	1	1/39	75.00	0	0
30	**Terence Cordaroy**	England	1979	1979	1	44	44	44.00	0	0	–	–	0	0
31	**Richard Hayward**	England	1979	1984	2	41	20	20.50	0	0	–	–	1	0
32	Andrew Lyon	England	1979	1988	6	8	4	1.60	330	5	42.80	3/71	1	0
33	**Peter Gooch**	England	1979	1979	1	2	2*	–	72	3	3/51	17.00	0	0
34	Michael Milton	England	1984	1985	2	75	42	37.50	108	2	1/13	29.00	0	0
35	Andrew Harwood	England	1984	1992	7	143	57	20.42	0	0	–	–	2	0
36	Michael Gear	England	1984	1984	1	1	1	1.00	0	0	–	–	0	0
37	Neil Hames ♠	England	1984	1991	7	44	12	6.28	0	0	–	–	1	0
38	**Richard Humphrey** †	England	1984	1984	2	42	39*	42.00	0	0	–	–	3	0
39	**Ian Hodgson**	England	1984	1989	5	51	24	10.20	144	0	–	–	2	0
40	**Hartley Alleyne**	Barbados	1984	1985	2	3	3	1.50	120	3	2/49	25.00	0	0
41	**Martin Jean-Jacques**	(Dominica) Windward Islands	1984	1985	2	1	1*	–	102	1	1/47	58.00	0	0
42	Timothy Peter Russell †	England	1985	1993	3	36	23	12.00	0	0	–	–	1	0
43	Stephen Burrow	England	1985	1993	7	121	57*	20.16	398	8	2/32	34.12	2	0
44	Gary Black ♠	England	1985	1993	8	36	14	5.14	423	10	3/83	32.80	4	0
45	Trevor Butler	England	1987	1990	4	79	44	19.75	0	0	–	–	0	0
46	Stephen Edwards	England	1987	1992	3	27	25*	27.00	216	3	2/14	33.66	1	0
47	David Goldsmith †	England	1987	1991	5	7	4	2.33	0	0	–	–	1	0
48	**Christopher Booden**	England	1987	1993	5	3	3	1.50	256	2	2/12	72.50	2	0
49	**Malcolm Roberts**	England	1988	1993	4	94	54	31.33	0	0	–	–	0	0
50	**Tim Scriven** ♠	England	1988	1999	9	57	33	8.14	540	9	3/61	43.55	2	0
51	Bruce Percy	England	1990	2001	8	59	19	8.42	126	3	1/2	27.66	2	0
52	Stephen Lynch	England	1990	1990	1	46	46	46.00	42	1	1/52	52.00	1	0
53	Timothy Barry	England	1990	1993	4	83	39	27.66	198	6	3/49	27.50	0	0
54	Paul Roshier	England	1991	1993	3	34	32	17.00	204	2	1/40	82.50	1	0
55	Richard Baigent	England	1992	1992	1	44	44	44.00	0	0	–	–	0	0
56	Nigel Farrow	England	1992	1992	1	1	1	1.00	0	0	–	–	0	0
57	Simon Shearman	England	1992	1993	2	23	15	11.50	0	0	–	–	3	0
58	Paul Strong	England	1993	1993	1	42	42	42.00	0	0	–	–	0	0
59	Richard Hurd	England	1997	1998	2	33	18	16.50	0	0	–	–	1	0
60	Matthew Bowyer	England	1997	2003	5	114	43	22.80	0	0	–	–	2	0
61	**Neil Burns**	England	1997	1999	4	90	51	22.50	0	0	–	–	5	1
62	**Keith Arthurton**	(Saint Kitts and Nevis) Leeward Islands	1997	2000	2	66	48	33.00	132	7	4/53	14.14	1	0
63	Paul Sawyer	England	1997	2005	10	196	50	24.50	42	3	2/55	19.33	6	0
64	Charles Jaggard	England	1997	1997	1	28	28	28.00	0	0	–	–	0	0
65	**Andrew Clarke**	England	1997	2003	9	5	5	1.00	503	17	5/36	21.76	2	0
66	Denzil Owen	Jamaica	1997	1997	1	0	0	–	72	1	1/81	81.00	1	0
67	Simon Stanway	England	1997	2005	12	6	2*	–	582	9	2/30	37.11	4	0
68	**Jason Harrison** ♠	England	1998	2005	1	34	34	34.00	132	1	1/80	124.00	1	0
69	**Mike Rindel**	South Africa	1998	1999	3	90	46	30.00	84	1	1/56	75.00	2	0
70	Russell Lane ♠	England	1998	2005	10	237	95	23.70	167	4	2/48	51.50	4	0
71	Anatole Thomas	England	1998	2005	4	20	9	10.00	222	5	3/47	38.40	0	0
72	**James Bovill**	England	1998	1999	3	4	4	2.00	174	7	3/64	15.14	0	0
73	Mark Sullivan	South Africa	1998	1998	1	14	14*	–	12	0	–	–	0	0
74	Greg Hames	England	1999	1999	1	16	16	16.00	0	0	–	–	0	0
75	**Paul Atkins** ♠	England	1999	2003	10	276	110	34.50	0	0	–	–	9	0
76	Kelvin Locke †	England	1999	2003	6	54	41	13.50	0	0	–	–	6	3
77	Paul Woodroffe	England	1999	2003	5	31	16*	31.00	228	7	2/18	20.85	0	0
78	Steven Naylor	England	2000	2001	2	9	7	4.50	114	1	1/80	108.00	2	0
79	**Jeremy Batty** ♠	England	2000	2003	8	150	36*	25.00	450	7	3/51	42.71	2	0
80	Graeme Paskins †	England	2000	2005	6	55	25	11.00	0	0	–	–	2	1
81	Mark Morgan	England	2000	2000	1	2	2	2.00	0	0	–	–	1	0
82	**Mark Richardson**	New Zealand	2001	2001	1	62	62	62.00	0	0	–	–	0	0
83	Matthew Eyles	England	2001	2003	2	5	5	2.50	0	0	–	–	0	0
84	Daniel Drepaul ♠	England	2001	2002	5	87	47*	29.00	0	0	–	–	1	4
85	**Nayan Doshi**	England	2001	2001	1	0	0	0.00	18	1	1/12	12.00	0	0
86	**James Benning**	England	2001	2001	2	43	23	21.50	18	1	1/26	26.00	1	0
87	Zaheer Sher	England	2001	2005	8	165	55*	41.25	397	13	3/23	26.76	1	0
88	Robert Jones	England	2002	2002	1	11	11	11.00	0	0	–	–	0	0
89	Adnan Saleem	England	2002	2005	5	2	2	1.00	179	5	3/24	32.20	1	0
90	**James Marshall**	New Zealand	2002	2003	4	51	24	12.75	0	0	–	–	2	0
91	David Taylor	England	2002	2002	2	154	140	77.00	0	0	–	–	1	0
92	David Barr	England	2003	2005	2	51	51	25.50	0	0	–	–	1	0
93	**Hamish Marshall**	New Zealand	2003	2003	1	66	66*	–	0	0	–	–	0	0
94	Andrew Ward †	England	2003	2003	1	0	0	–	0	0	–	–	0	0
95	**Keith Medlycott**	England	2005	2005	1	21	21*	–	0	0	–	–	1	0
96	Alan Duncan	Scotland	2005	2005	1	0	0	–	30	0	–	–	0	0

== List A captains ==
No.	Name	First	Last	Mat	Won	Lost	Tied	Win%
1	Peter Stoddart	1965	1965	1	0	1	0	0%
2	John Slack	1969	1969	1	0	1	0	0%
3	Christopher Parry	1970	1972	4	2	2	0	50%
4	David Mackintosh	1974	1975	2	0	2	0	0%
5	Brian Poll	1979	1979	1	0	1	0	0%
6	David Smith	1984	1985	2	0	2	0	0%
7	Neil Hames	1987	1991	5	1	4	0	20%
8	Gary Black	1992	1993	2	0	2	0	0%
9	Tim Scriven	1997	1997	1	0	1	0	0%
10	Jason Harrison	1998	1998	1	0	1	0	0%
11	Paul Atkins	1999	2003	10	5	5	0	50%
12	Jeremy Batty	2001	2001	1	0	1	0	0%
13	Russell Lane	2005	2005	1	0	1	0	0%
**Total**		1965	2005	**32**	**8**	**24**	**0**	**25.00%**
