= List of Buckinghamshire CCC List A records =

Established in 1891, Buckinghamshire County Cricket Club is one of the nineteen county clubs which form the Minor counties of English and Welsh cricket. Not afforded first-class status, Buckinghamshire have however played List A cricket, making its first List A appearance in the 1965 Gillette Cup against Middlesex. This continued until it was announced that the Minor counties would be excluded from the Cheltenham & Gloucester Trophy from the 2006 season onward.

== Team ==
- Highest Total For: 424/5 v Suffolk at Dinton Park, Dinton, 2002
- Highest Total Against: 401/7 by Gloucestershire at Ascott Park, Ascott, 2003
- Lowest Total For: 77 v Gloucestershire at Ascott Park, Ascott, 2003
- Lowest Total Against: 41 by Cambridgeshire at Fenner's, Cambridge, 1972

== Batting ==
- Highest score: 140 David Taylor v Suffolk, Dinton Cricket Club Ground, 2002
- Most runs in season: 154 David Taylor, 2002

=== Most List A runs for Buckinghamshire ===
Qualification – 150 runs

- Paul Atkins 276
- John Turner 254
- Russell Lane 237
- Paul Sawyer 196
- Zaheer Sher 165
- David Taylor 154
- Ronald Hooker 152
- Jeremy Batty 150

=== Highest Partnership for each wicket ===
The following are the record partnerships for each wicket:

Wkt	Runs	Partnership	Opponent	Ground	Season
1st	126	John Turner & Gwynne Jones	Kent	St Lawrence Ground, Canterbury	1974
2nd	137	Russell Lane & David Barr	Dorset	Dean Park, Bournemouth	2003
3rd	131	David Taylor & Paul Atkins	Suffolk	Dinton Park, Dinton	2002
4th	125	Paul Atkins & Paul Sawyer	Suffolk	Dinton Park, Dinton	2002
5th	45	Ray Hutchison & Ronald Hooker	Kent	St Lawrence Ground, Canterbury	1974
6th	65*	Zaheer Sher & Jeremy Batty	Suffolk	Dinton Park, Dinton	2002
7th	68	Zaheer Sher & Daniel Drepaul	Sussex	Wilton Park, Beaconsfield	2002
8th	56*	Stuart York & Brian Poll	Middlesex	Lord's, London	1975
9th=	29	Timothy Barry & Timothy Peter Russell	Sussex	Wilton Park, Beaconsfield	1992
10th	29	Richard Hurd & Mark Sullivan	Surrey	The Oval, London	1998

== Bowling ==
- Best bowling: 5/17 Raymond Bond v Cambridgeshire at Fenner's, Cambridge, 1972
- Wickets in season: 10, Andrew Clarke, 2002

=== Most List A wickets for Buckinghamshire ===
Qualification - 8 wickets

- Andrew Clarke 17
- Zaheer Sher 13
- Frederick Harris 11
- Raymond Bond 10
- Gary Black 10
- Tim Scriven 9
- Simon Stanway 9
- Stephen Burrow 8

== See also ==
- Buckinghamshire County Cricket Club
- List of Buckinghamshire CCC List A players
