= 2023 Women's Twenty20 Cup =

English cricket season

- Dates: 16 April 2023 – 8 July 2023
- Administrator(s): England and Wales Cricket Board
- Cricket format: Twenty20
- Tournament format(s): League system
- Champions: No overall winner
- Participants: 35
- Matches: 131
- Most runs: Gemma Marriott (203)
- Most wickets: Bhoomika Bhat (12); Rebecca Tyson (12)

The 2023 Women's Twenty20 Cup, known for sponsorship reasons as the 2023 Vitality Women's County T20, was the 14th edition of the Women's Twenty20 Cup, an English women's cricket Twenty20 domestic competition. It was scheduled to take place in April and May 2023, although one matchday was played later due to rain, with 35 teams taking part, organised into eight regional groups.

There was no overall winner, with Lancashire, Warwickshire, Gloucestershire, Sussex, Northamptonshire and Somerset winning their individual groups. Middlesex and Kent shared their group title due to rain on their group Finals Day. One group winner was not determined, with the Group 4 Finals Day abandoned due to rain.

== Format ==
Teams played matches within a series of regional divisions, playing three matchdays, with most matchdays consisting of two matches between the same teams. Matches were played using a Twenty20 format. The group stages were followed by a group Finals Day, scheduled for 14 May, with all teams from the group stage qualifying, with first playing fourth and second playing third in the semi-finals.

The groups worked on a points system with positions being based on total points. Points were awarded as follows:

Win: 4 points.
Tie: 2 points.
Loss: 0 points.
Abandoned/Cancelled: 1 point.

== Teams ==
Teams were divided into eight regional groups. Group 1 consisted of 7 teams, whilst Groups 2 to 7 consisted of 4 teams apiece. Scotland replacing North Representative XI was the only change from the 2022 season.

Group 1	Cumbria	Derbyshire	Lancashire	North East Warriors	Nottinghamshire	Scotland	Yorkshire
Group 2	Leicestershire and Rutland	Staffordshire	Warwickshire	Worcestershire			
Group 3	Dorset	Gloucestershire	Shropshire	Wiltshire			
Group 4	Cambridgeshire	Huntingdonshire	Lincolnshire	Norfolk			
Group 5	Berkshire	Buckinghamshire	Hampshire	Sussex			
Group 6	Kent	Middlesex	Oxfordshire	Surrey			
Group 7	Essex	Hertfordshire	Northamptonshire	Suffolk			
Group 8	Cornwall	Devon	Somerset	Wales			

== Standings ==
Note: Teams highlighted in gold were champions of their group, by virtue of winning on Finals Day. The group winners title was shared in Group 6 due to rain.

=== Group 1 ===
Pos	Team	Pld	W	L	T	NR	Pts	NRR
1	Scotland (Q)	6	2	0	0	4	12	2.900
2	Lancashire (Q)	6	1	1	0	4	8	2.500
3	Derbyshire (Q)	6	0	0	0	6	6	0.000
4	Nottinghamshire (Q)	6	0	0	0	6	6	0.000
5	North East Warriors	6	0	0	0	6	6	0.000
6	Yorkshire	6	0	0	0	6	6	0.000
7	Cumbria	6	0	2	0	4	4	−5.900

Source: Play-Cricket

advanced to 1A Finals Day. Teams equal in the standings were chosen by lot to advance to 1A Finals Day.

=== Group 2 ===
Pos	Team	Pld	W	L	T	NR	Pts	NRR
1	Leicestershire and Rutland	6	0	0	0	6	6	0.000
2	Staffordshire	6	0	0	0	6	6	0.000
3	Warwickshire	6	0	0	0	6	6	0.000
4	Worcestershire	6	0	0	0	6	6	0.000

Source: Play-Cricket

=== Group 3 ===
Pos	Team	Pld	W	L	T	NR	Pts	NRR
1	Gloucestershire	6	3	0	0	3	15	2.820
2	Wiltshire	6	2	0	0	4	12	2.210
3	Shropshire	6	0	1	0	5	5	−0.670
4	Dorset	6	0	4	0	2	2	−3.010

Source: Play-Cricket

=== Group 4 ===
Pos	Team	Pld	W	L	T	NR	Pts	NRR
1	Cambridgeshire	6	3	2	0	1	13	1.050
2	Lincolnshire	6	2	2	0	2	10	−0.410
3	Norfolk	6	1	0	0	5	9	1.050
4	Huntingdonshire	6	1	3	0	2	6	−1.160

Source: Play-Cricket

=== Group 5 ===
Pos	Team	Pld	W	L	T	NR	Pts	NRR
1	Hampshire	6	4	2	0	0	16	1.070
2	Sussex	6	3	1	0	2	14	0.160
3	Berkshire	6	1	1	0	4	8	−1.530
4	Buckinghamshire	6	0	4	0	2	2	−1.030

Source: Play-Cricket

=== Group 6 ===
Pos	Team	Pld	W	L	T	NR	Pts	NRR
1	Middlesex	6	4	0	0	2	18	1.340
2	Kent	6	2	0	0	4	12	3.310
3	Surrey	6	2	2	0	2	10	0.110
4	Oxfordshire	6	0	6	0	0	0	−2.130

Source: Play-Cricket

=== Group 7 ===
Pos	Team	Pld	W	L	T	NR	Pts	NRR
1	Northamptonshire	6	4	2	0	0	16	1.210
2	Hertfordshire	6	3	1	0	2	14	−0.060
3	Essex	6	2	1	0	3	11	0.540
4	Suffolk	6	0	5	0	1	1	−1.830

Source: Play-Cricket

=== Group 8 ===
Pos	Team	Pld	W	L	T	NR	Pts	NRR
1	Wales	6	2	0	0	4	12	2.930
2	Devon	6	0	0	0	6	6	0.000
3	Somerset	6	0	0	0	6	6	0.000
4	Cornwall	6	0	2	0	4	4	−2.930

Source: Play-Cricket

== Fixtures ==
=== Group 1 ===
==== Group stage ====
16 April 2023
10:30 BST

North East Warriors	v	Yorkshire

Match Abandoned
South Northumberland Cricket Club, Gosforth

- No toss.
- No play possible due to rain.

16 April 2023
11:00 BST

Derbyshire	v	Scotland

Match Abandoned
Cuckney CC, Cuckney

- No toss.
- No play possible due to rain.

16 April 2023
11:00 BST

Nottinghamshire	v	Lancashire

Match Abandoned
Cuckney CC, Cuckney

- No toss.
- No play possible due to rain.

16 April 2023
13:30 BST

Yorkshire	v	Cumbria

Match Abandoned
South Northumberland Cricket Club, Gosforth

- No toss.
- No play possible due to rain.

16 April 2023
15:00 BST

Derbyshire	v	Lancashire

Match Abandoned
Cuckney CC, Cuckney

- No toss.
- No play possible due to rain.

16 April 2023
15:00 BST

Nottinghamshire	v	Scotland

Match Abandoned
Cuckney CC, Cuckney

- No toss.
- No play possible due to rain.

16 April 2023
16:30 BST

North East Warriors	v	Cumbria

Match Abandoned
South Northumberland Cricket Club, Gosforth

- No toss.
- No play possible due to rain.

23 April 2023
11:00 BST
Scorecard

Scotland; 180/7 (20 overs)	v	Lancashire; 134/4 (20 overs)
Ailsa Lister 117* (75); Daisy Mullan 3/37 (4 overs)		Sophia Turner 59* (65); Megan McColl 2/19 (4 overs)

Scotland won by 47 runs
Titwood, Glasgow
Umpires: Neil Cauldwell and Craig MacDonnell

- Scotland won the toss and elected to bat.

23 April 2023
11:00 BST

Nottinghamshire	v	North East Warriors

Match Abandoned
Clifton Park Ground, York

- No toss.
- No play possible due to rain.

23 April 2023
11:00 BST

Yorkshire	v	Derbyshire

Match Abandoned
Clifton Park Ground, York

- No toss.
- No play possible due to rain.

23 April 2023
13:30 BST
Scorecard

Lancashire; 216/2 (20 overs)	v	Cumbria; 70/6 (20 overs)
Seren Smale 121* (69); Maddie Wood 1/35 (4 overs)		Tilly Kesteven 33* (51); Laura Jackson 1/4 (3 overs)

Lancashire won by 146 runs
Titwood, Glasgow
Umpires: Neil Cauldwell and Craig MacDonell

- Lancashire won the toss and elected to bat.

23 April 2023
15:00 BST
Scorecard

Cumbria; 83/7 (16 overs)	v	Scotland; 80/2 (9.3 overs)
Emily Tucker 24 (22); Kirsty McColl 2/21 (4 overs)		Ellen Watson 39 (20); Grace Airey 1/14 (2 overs)

Scotland won by 8 wickets (DLS)
Titwood, Glasgow
Umpires: Neil Cauldwell and Craig MacDonell

- Cumbria won the toss and elected to bat.
- Rain interruption during Cumbria's innings, with match reduced to 16 overs per side; Scotland's target was 80.

23 April 2023
15:00 BST

Derbyshire	v	North East Warriors

Match Abandoned
Clifton Park Ground, York

- No toss.
- No play possible due to rain.

23 April 2023
15:00 BST

Yorkshire	v	Nottinghamshire

Match Abandoned
Clifton Park Ground, York

- No toss.
- No play possible due to rain.

8 May 2023
10:30 BST

Derbyshire	v	Cumbria

Match Abandoned
Spondon Cricket Club, Spondon

- No toss.
- No play possible due to rain.

8 May 2023
11:00 BST

Scotland	v	Yorkshire

Match Abandoned
Northern Cricket Club, Crosby

- No toss.
- No play possible due to rain.

8 May 2023
11:00 BST

Lancashire	v	North East Warriors

Match Abandoned
Northern Cricket Club, Crosby

- No toss.
- No play possible due to rain.

8 May 2023
13:30 BST

Cumbria	v	Nottinghamshire

Match Abandoned
Spondon Cricket Club, Spondon

- No toss.
- No play possible due to rain.

8 May 2023
15:00 BST

Scotland	v	North East Warriors

Match Abandoned
Northern Cricket Club, Crosby

- No toss.
- No play possible due to rain.

8 May 2023
15:00 BST

Lancashire	v	Yorkshire

Match Abandoned
Northern Cricket Club, Crosby

- No toss.
- No play possible due to rain.

8 May 2023
16:30 BST

Derbyshire	v	Nottinghamshire

Match Abandoned
Spondon Cricket Club, Spondon

- No toss.
- No play possible due to rain.

==== Finals Day ====
Semi-Final
14 May 2023
10:30 BST
Scorecard

Lancashire; 135/6 (20 overs)	v	Nottinghamshire; 113/9 (20 overs)
Seren Smale 65 (48); Amelia Kite 3/30 (4 overs)		Michaela Kirk 49 (51); Alex Hartley 2/14 (4 overs)

Lancashire won by 22 runs
Bradshaw CC, Bradshaw

- Nottinghamshire won the toss and elected to field.

Semi-Final
14 May 2023
13:30 BST
Scorecard

Scotland; 126/9 (20 overs)	v	Derbyshire; 91 (19.3 overs)
Ailsa Lister 37 (–); Maria Andrews 3/11 (4 overs)		Kathryn Bryce 19 (–); Katherine Fraser 4/18 (3.3 overs)

Scotland won by 35 runs
Bradshaw CC, Bradshaw

- Scotland won the toss and elected to bat.

Final
14 May 2023
16:30 BST
Scorecard

Lancashire; 141/7 (18 overs)	v	Scotland; 78 (14.1 overs)
Emma Lamb 47 (34); Megan McColl 2/26 (4 overs)		Megan McColl 21 (33); Phoebe Graham 2/12 (3 overs)

Lancashire won by 46 runs (DLS)
Bradshaw CC, Bradshaw

- Lancashire won the toss and elected to bat.
- Lancashire innings reduced to 18 overs due to rain.
- Scotland innings was reduced to 15 overs due to rain; revised target was 125.

1B Match 1
14 May 2023
10:30 BST
Scorecard

Cumbria; 94/8 (20 overs)	v	North East Warriors; 95/2 (17.4 overs)
Olivia Brinsden 38 (43); Libby Haward 3/12 (4 overs)		Harriet Robson 35* (48); Kate Field 1/13 (2.4 overs)

North East Warriors won by 8 wickets
Sedbergh School, Sedbergh

- North East Warriors won the toss and elected to field.

1B Match 2
14 May 2023
13:30 BST
Scorecard

Yorkshire; 77/9 (20 overs)	v	North East Warriors; 81/4 (17.5 overs)
Hannah Buck 36 (49); Lilly-Mai Taylor 2/8 (3 overs)		Harriet Robson 33* (52); Elicia Pollard 1/0 (1 over)

North East Warriors won by 6 wickets
Sedbergh School, Sedbergh

- North East Warriors won the toss and elected to field.

1B Match 3
14 May 2023
16:30 BST
Scorecard

Cumbria; 62 (19.1 overs)	v	Yorkshire; 65/3 (15.4 overs)
Maeve Jones 24 (30); Rhia Sedha 5/7 (4 overs)		Elise Good 42* (47); Mahika Gaur 2/8 (4 overs)

Yorkshire won by 7 wickets
Sedbergh School, Sedbergh

- Cumbria won the toss and elected to bat.

=== Group 2 ===
==== Group stage ====
16 April 2023
11:00 BST

Staffordshire	v	Worcestershire

Match Abandoned
Stafford CC, Stafford

- No toss.
- No play possible due to rain.

16 April 2023
11:00 BST

Warwickshire	v	Leicestershire and Rutland

Match Abandoned
Harbone CC, Harborne, Birmingham

- No toss.
- No play possible due to rain.

16 April 2023
15:00 BST

Staffordshire	v	Worcestershire

Match Abandoned
Stafford CC, Stafford

- No toss.
- No play possible due to rain.

16 April 2023
15:00 BST

Warwickshire	v	Leicestershire and Rutland

Match Abandoned
Harbone CC, Harborne, Birmingham

- No toss.
- No play possible due to rain.

23 April 2023
11:00 BST

Leicestershire and Rutland	v	Staffordshire

Match Abandoned
Loughborough Town, Loughborough

- No toss.
- No play possible due to rain.

23 April 2023
11:00 BST

Worcestershire	v	Warwickshire

Match Abandoned
Bromsgrove Cricket Club, Bromsgrove

- No toss.
- No play possible due to rain.

23 April 2023
15:00 BST

Leicestershire and Rutland	v	Staffordshire

Match Abandoned
Loughborough Town, Loughborough

- No toss.
- No play possible due to rain.

23 April 2023
15:00 BST

Worcestershire	v	Warwickshire

Match Abandoned
Bromsgrove Cricket Club, Bromsgrove

- No toss.
- No play possible due to rain.

8 May 2023
11:00 BST

Warwickshire	v	Staffordshire

Match Abandoned
Edgbaston Foundation Ground, Birmingham

- No toss.
- No play possible due to rain.

8 May 2023
11:00 BST

Worcestershire	v	Leicestershire and Rutland

Match Abandoned
Bromsgrove Cricket Club, Bromsgrove

- No toss.
- No play possible due to rain.

8 May 2023
15:00 BST

Warwickshire	v	Staffordshire

Match Abandoned
Edgbaston Foundation Ground, Birmingham

- No toss.
- No play possible due to rain.

8 May 2023
15:00 BST

Worcestershire	v	Leicestershire and Rutland

Match Abandoned
Bromsgrove Cricket Club, Bromsgrove

- No toss.
- No play possible due to rain.

==== Finals Day ====
Semi-Final
14 May 2023
10:30 BST
Scorecard

Staffordshire; 130/3 (20 overs)	v	Leicestershire and Rutland; 104/6 (20 overs)
Meg Austin 50 (58); Aimee Colquhoun 1/18 (4 overs)		Rebecca Brooker 34 (42); Amelia Lee 3/10 (3 overs)

Staffordshire won by 26 runs
Highfield, Leek

- Leicestershire and Rutland won the toss and elected to field.

Semi-Final
14 May 2023
13:30 BST
Scorecard

Warwickshire; 133/4 (20 overs)	v	Worcestershire; 96 (20 overs)
Bethan Ellis 37 (44); Hannah Hardwick 2/17 (3 overs)		Clare Boycott 24 (36); Hannah Baker 4/14 (4 overs)

Warwickshire won by 37 runs
Highfield, Leek

- Warwickshire won the toss and elected to bat.

Final
14 May 2023
16:30 BST
Scorecard

Staffordshire; 102/8 (20 overs)	v	Warwickshire; 103/1 (15.5 overs)
Abigail Freeborn 32 (38); Georgia Davis 2/13 (4 overs)		Marie Kelly 42* (39); Amelia Lee 1/26 (4 overs)

Warwickshire won by 9 wickets
Highfield, Leek

- Staffordshire won the toss and elected to bat.

=== Group 3 ===
==== Group stage ====
16 April 2023
11:00 BST

Wiltshire	v	Shropshire

Match Abandoned
Kenilworth CC, Kenilworth

- No toss.
- No play possible due to rain.

16 April 2023
15:00 BST

Wiltshire	v	Shropshire

Match Abandoned
Kenilworth CC, Kenilworth

- No toss.
- No play possible due to rain.

23 April 2023
11:00 BST
Scorecard

Shropshire; 76 (18 overs)	v	Gloucestershire; 82/7 (18.2 overs)
Beth Charnell 28 (36); Bhoomika Bhat 4/15 (4 overs)		Katie Dolman 18 (21); Harriet Shuker 3/7 (4 overs)

Gloucestershire won by 3 wickets
Worfield CC, Worfield

- Gloucestershire won the toss and elected to field.

23 April 2023
11:00 BST
Scorecard

Wiltshire; 147/2 (20 overs)	v	Dorset; 83/6 (20 overs)
Maxine Blythin 72* (64); Megan Bishop 2/14 (3 overs)		Katie Butler 17* (50); Holly Morgan 2/8 (2 overs)

Wiltshire won by 64 runs
Westbury & District CC, Westbury
Umpires: Rocky Riccalton and Richard Saunders

- Dorset won the toss and elected to field.

23 April 2023
15:00 BST
Scorecard

Shropshire; 23/2 (8.4 overs)	v	Gloucestershire
Beth Charnell 13* (19); Charlie Phillips 1/3 (2 overs)

No Result
Worfield CC, Worfield

- Gloucestershire won the toss and elected to field.
- No further play possible due to rain.

23 April 2023
15:00 BST
Scorecard

Dorset; 94/7 (20 overs)	v	Wiltshire; 94/7 (20 overs)
Megan Bishop 18* (13); Katy Cobb 2/14 (4 overs)		Isla Thomson 46* (44); Lizzie Williams 2/33 (4 overs)

Wiltshire won by 5 wickets
Westbury & District CC, Westbury
Umpires: Rocky Riccalton and Richard Saunders

- Wiltshire won the toss and elected to field.

30 April 2023
11:00 BST
Scorecard

Gloucestershire; 131/6 (20 overs)	v	Dorset; 49/8 (20 overs)
Katie Dolman 51 (47); Ceri Harris 3/24 (4 overs)		Freya Cutler 10 (21); Charlie Phillips 2/4 (3 overs)

Gloucestershire won by 82 runs
Dorchester CC, Dorchester

- Gloucestershire won the toss and elected to bat.
- Match rearranged from 16 April 2023.

30 April 2023
15:00 BST
Scorecard

Gloucestershire; 104/5 (20 overs)	v	Dorset; 32 (14.5 overs)
Beatrix Willis 36 (39); Lizzie Williams 1/6 (2 overs)		Mamta Kothiyal 8 (25); Bhoomika Bhat 3/3 (3 overs)

Gloucestershire won by 72 runs
Dorchester CC, Dorchester

- Gloucestershire won the toss and elected to bat.
- Match rearranged from 16 April 2023.

8 May 2023
11:00 BST

Dorset	v	Shropshire

Match Abandoned
Wimborne CC, Wimborne Minster

- No toss.
- No play possible due to rain.

8 May 2023
11:00 BST

Gloucestershire	v	Wiltshire

Match Abandoned
Ironmould Lane, Brislington, Bristol

- No toss.
- No play possible due to rain.

8 May 2023
15:00 BST

Dorset	v	Shropshire

Match Abandoned
Wimborne CC, Wimborne Minster

- No toss.
- No play possible due to rain.

8 May 2023
15:00 BST

Gloucestershire	v	Wiltshire

Match Abandoned
Ironmould Lane, Brislington, Bristol

- No toss.
- No play possible due to rain.

==== Finals Day ====
Semi-Final
14 May 2023
10:30 BST
Scorecard

Gloucestershire; 155/2 (20 overs)	v	Dorset; 50 (19.2 overs)
Beatrix Ellis 60* (55); Emelia Butler 1/26 (3 overs)		Victoria Pack 15 (34); Bhoomika Bhat 3/3 (4 overs)

Gloucestershire won by 105 runs
County Ground, Bristol
Umpires: Matt Jackson and Jason Belcher

- Dorset won the toss and elected to field.

Semi-Final
14 May 2023
13:30 BST
Scorecard

Shropshire; 131/5 (20 overs)	v	Wiltshire; 117/8 (20 overs)
Amy Weir 37* (25); Poppy Walker 1/13 (2 overs)		Isla Thomson 35 (30); Lauren Kenvyn 3/17 (4 overs)

Shropshire won by 14 runs
County Ground, Bristol
Umpires: Robin Scott and Matt Jackson

- Shropshire won the toss and elected to bat.

Final
14 May 2023
16:30 BST
Scorecard

Gloucestershire; 161/7 (20 overs)	v	Shropshire; 73/8 (20 overs)
Fran Wilson 53 (35); Lauren Kenvyn 2/26 (4 overs)		Holly Whitfield 26 (39); Alice Hill 2/11 (3 overs)

Gloucestershire won by 88 runs
County Ground, Bristol
Umpires: Jason Belcher and Robin Scott

- Shropshire won the toss and elected to field.

=== Group 4 ===
==== Group stage ====
16 April 2023
11:00 BST

Lincolnshire	v	Norfolk

Match Abandoned
Cleethorpes CC, Cleethorpes

- No toss.
- No play possible due to rain.

16 April 2023
15:00 BST

Lincolnshire	v	Norfolk

Match Abandoned
Cleethorpes CC, Cleethorpes

- No toss.
- No play possible due to rain.

23 April 2023
11:00 BST
Scorecard

Lincolnshire; 90/7 (20 overs)	v	Huntingdonshire; 81/7 (20 overs)
Millie Greenwood 24 (32); Faith Teekasingh 2/5 (3 overs)		Holly Chambers 13* (18); Abigail Hannan 2/11 (4 overs)

Lincolnshire won by 9 runs
Skegness CC, Skegness

- Huntingdonshire won the toss and elected to field.

23 April 2023
11:00 BST
Scorecard

Norfolk; 121/3 (20 overs)	v	Cambridgeshire; 100/6 (20 overs)
Grace Hanworth-Knights 66* (69); Freya Houlden 1/26 (4 overs)		Nina Jerman 36 (48); Maddy Browne 2/8 (2 overs)

Norfolk won by 21 runs
Great Witchingham CC, Great Witchingham
Umpires: Steve Utting and Richard Sage

- Norfolk won the toss and elected to bat.

23 April 2023
15:00 BST
Scorecard

Huntingdonshire; 85/7 (20 overs)	v	Lincolnshire; 82/9 (20 overs)
Abigail Butcher 27 (31); Kate Williams 2/23 (3 overs)		Lillimae Severn 38 (56); Emily Carpenter 3/17 (4 overs)

Huntingdonshire won by 3 runs
Skegness CC, Skegness

- Lincolnshire won the toss and elected to field.

23 April 2023
15:00 BST
Scorecard

Cambridgeshire; 45/3 (10.2 overs)	v	Norfolk
Freya Houlden 19 (24); Maddy Browne 1/6 (2 overs)

No Result
Great Witchingham CC, Great Witchingham
Umpires: Steve Utting and Richard Sage

- Cambridgeshire won the toss and elected to bat.
- No further play possible due to rain.

30 April 2023
11:00 BST
Scorecard

Huntingdonshire; 86/5 (20 overs)	v	Cambridgeshire; 87/1 (17.1 overs)
Faith Teekasingh 24* (33); Sophia Pearson 2/10 (3 overs)		May Busher 33* (47); Holly Chambers 1/14 (3 overs)

Cambridgeshire won by 9 wickets
Hardwick & Caldecote CC, Caldecote

- Cambridgeshire won the toss and elected to field.
- Match rearranged from 16 April 2023.

30 April 2023
15:00 BST
Scorecard

Cambridgeshire; 143/6 (20 overs)	v	Huntingdonshire; 72/5 (20 overs)
May Busher 31 (27); Ella Briault 2/22 (4 overs)		Lottie Taylor 21 (29); Katie McPherson 2/2 (1 over)

Cambridgeshire won by 71 runs
Hardwick & Caldecote CC, Caldecote

- Huntingdonshire won the toss and elected to field.
- Match rearranged from 16 April 2023.

8 May 2023
11:00 BST
Scorecard

Lincolnshire; 78/6 (20 overs)	v	Cambridgeshire; 77/6 (20 overs)
Lillimae Severn 32* (59); Beth Matthews 2/4 (4 overs)		Sirisha Gorantla 27 (46); Lauren Tuffrey 3/11 (4 overs)

Lincolnshire won by 1 run
March Town CC, March

- Cambridgeshire won the toss and elected to field.

8 May 2023
11:00 BST

Huntingdonshire	v	Norfolk

Match Abandoned
Ramsey CC, Ramsey

- No toss.
- No play possible due to rain.

8 May 2023
15:00 BST
Scorecard

Cambridgeshire; 121/4 (20 overs)	v	Lincolnshire; 81/6 (20 overs)
Kelly Haynes 35* (22); Lauren Tuffrey 2/12 (3 overs)		Millie Greenwood 19 (18); Jessica McCrum 2/29 (4 overs)

Cambridgeshire won by 40 runs
March Town CC, March

- Lincolnshire won the toss and elected to field.

8 May 2023
15:00 BST

Huntingdonshire	v	Norfolk

Match Abandoned
Ramsey CC, Ramsey

- No toss.
- No play possible due to rain.

==== Finals Day ====
Semi-Final
14 May 2023
10:30 BST

Lincolnshire	v	Norfolk

Match Abandoned

- No play possible due to rain.

Semi-Final
14 May 2023
13:30 BST

Cambridgeshire	v	Huntingdonshire

Match Abandoned

- No play possible due to rain.

Final
14 May 2023
16:30 BST

TBD	v	TBD

- Semi-finals were abandoned due to rain, meaning that the final could not go ahead.

=== Group 5 ===
==== Group stage ====
16 April 2023
11:00 BST

Berkshire	v	Buckinghamshire

Match Abandoned
Sonning Lane, Reading

- No toss.
- No play possible due to rain.

16 April 2023
12:00 BST
Scorecard

Hampshire; 115/6 (20 overs)	v	Sussex; 80/5 (20 overs)
Danielle Ransley 29 (25); Nancy Harman 2/9 (2 overs)		Nancy Harman 15 (14); Eve O'Neill 4/13 (4 overs)

Hampshire won by 35 runs
Brighton Aldridge Community Academy Ground, Brighton
Umpires: Nikki Batchelor and Fiona Richards

- Sussex won the toss and elected to field.

16 April 2023
15:00 BST

Berkshire	v	Buckinghamshire

Match Abandoned
Sonning Lane, Reading

- No toss.
- No play possible due to rain.

16 April 2023
16:00 BST
Scorecard

Sussex; 91/7 (20 overs)	v	Hampshire; 74 (19.1 overs)
Georgia Adams 25 (26); Finty Trussler 3/13 (3 overs)		Maia Bouchier 15 (24); Daisy Gibb 2/6 (3 overs)

Sussex won by 17 runs
Brighton Aldridge Community Academy Ground, Brighton
Umpires: Nikki Batchelor and Fiona Richards

- Sussex won the toss and elected to bat.

23 April 2023
11:00 BST
Scorecard

Hampshire; 86/7 (20 overs)	v	Buckinghamshire; 83/7 (20 overs)
Danielle Ransley 29 (40); Cara Duggan 4/17 (4 overs)		Amelia Peck 23 (33); Danielle Ransley 3/12 (4 overs)

Hampshire won by 3 runs
Dinton Cricket Club Ground, Dinton

- Buckinghamshire won the toss and elected to field.

23 April 2023
11:00 BST

Sussex	v	Berkshire

Match Abandoned
Brighton Aldridge Community Academy Ground, Brighton

- No toss.
- No play possible due to rain.

23 April 2023
15:00 BST
Scorecard

Hampshire; 111/7 (20 overs)	v	Buckinghamshire; 65 (14.4 overs)
Sophie Mitchelmore 34 (31); Hannah Davis 3/19 (4 overs)		Amelia Peck 25 (24); Caitlin Chissell 4/12 (3 overs)

Hampshire won by 46 runs
Dinton Cricket Club Ground, Dinton

- Hampshire won the toss and elected to bat.

23 April 2023
15:00 BST

Sussex	v	Berkshire

Match Abandoned
Brighton Aldridge Community Academy Ground, Brighton

- No toss.
- No play possible due to rain.

8 May 2023
11:00 BST
Scorecard

Hampshire; 148/4 (20 overs)	v	Berkshire; 86/6 (20 overs)
Emily Windsor 69* (67); Laura Bailey 1/21 (4 overs)		Mia Rogers 38 (42); Eve O'Neill 2/7 (2 overs)

Hampshire won by 62 runs
FWE Goates Memorial Ground, Binfield
Umpires: John Reed and Nikki Batchelor

- Berkshire won the toss and elected to field.

8 May 2023
11:00 BST
Scorecard

Buckinghamshire; 95/8 (20 overs)	v	Sussex; 96/2 (16.2 overs)
Cara Duggan 37 (47); Beth Harvey 2/14 (4 overs)		Nicole Faltum 32 (35); Alissa Shannon 1/16 (3 overs)

Sussex won by 8 wickets
Dinton Cricket Club Ground, Dinton

- Sussex won the toss and elected to field.

8 May 2023
15:00 BST
Scorecard

Hampshire; 93/8 (20 overs)	v	Berkshire; 94/5 (20 overs)
Sophie Mitchelmore 34 (33); Ava Lee 3/15 (4 overs)		Mia Rogers 51* (62); Finty Trussler 2/21 (4 overs)

Berkshire won by 5 wickets
FWE Goates Memorial Ground, Binfield
Umpires: John Reed and Nikki Batchelor

- Hampshire won the toss and elected to bat.

8 May 2023
15:00 BST
Scorecard

Buckinghamshire; 89/7 (20 overs)	v	Sussex; 90/5 (17.4 overs)
Amelia Peck 33 (43); Chiara Green 2/12 (4 overs)		Nicole Faltum 35 (39); Megs Woodward 2/12 (4 overs)

Sussex won by 5 wickets
Dinton Cricket Club Ground, Dinton

- Buckinghamshire won the toss and elected to bat.

==== Finals Day ====
Semi-Final
14 May 2023
10:30 BST
Scorecard

Hampshire; 176/4 (20 overs)	v	Buckinghamshire; 60 (18.3 overs)
Emily Windsor 85 (49); Alissa Shannon 1/26 (4 overs)		Natasha MacBean 8 (12); Finty Trussler 3/2 (2 overs)

Hampshire won by 116 runs
County Ground, Hove

- Buckinghamshire won the toss and elected to field.

Semi-Final
14 May 2023
13:30 BST
Scorecard

Sussex; 136/5 (20 overs)	v	Berkshire; 72/7 (20 overs)
Mary Taylor 82* (62); Hollie Summerfield 3/21 (3 overs)		Ashleigh Muttitt 20 (24); Mary Taylor 2/9 (3 overs)

Sussex won by 64 runs
County Ground, Hove

- Berkshire won the toss and elected to field.

Final
14 May 2023
16:30 BST
Scorecard

Sussex; 122/5 (20 overs)	v	Hampshire; 97/6 (20 overs)
Nicole Faltum 37 (38); Gemma Lane 2/9 (2 overs)		Charlotte Taylor 44 (55); Chiara Green 2/17 (4 overs)

Sussex won by 25 runs
County Ground, Hove

- Sussex won the toss and elected to bat.

=== Group 6 ===
==== Group stage ====
16 April 2023
11:00 BST

Kent	v	Middlesex

Match Abandoned
Polo Farm, Canterbury

- No toss.
- No play possible due to rain.

16 April 2023
15:00 BST

Kent	v	Middlesex

Match Abandoned
Polo Farm, Canterbury

- No toss.
- No play possible due to rain.

23 April 2023
11:00 BST
Scorecard

Oxfordshire; 71/8 (20 overs)	v	Middlesex; 72/2 (12.5 overs)
Ellie Ingram 13 (18); Emily Thorpe 2/8 (3 overs)		Amara Carr 29* (32); Laura Jacob 2/8 (3.5 overs)

Middlesex won by 8 wickets
Didcot CC, Didcot
Umpires: David Hall and Ian Royle

- Middlesex won the toss and elected to field.

23 April 2023
11:00 BST

Surrey	v	Kent

Match Abandoned
Wimbledon Cricket Club Ground, Wimbledon, London

- No toss.
- No play possible due to rain.

23 April 2023
15:00 BST
Scorecard

Oxfordshire; 69 (19.4 overs)	v	Middlesex; 71/5 (16.5 overs)
Carla Wood 17 (47); Isabella Routledge 2/9 (4 overs)		Saskia Horley 33* (48); Laura Jacob 2/14 (4 overs)

Middlesex won by 5 wickets
Didcot CC, Didcot
Umpires: David Hall and Ian Royle

- Middlesex won the toss and elected to field.

23 April 2023
15:00 BST

Surrey	v	Kent

Match Abandoned
Wimbledon Cricket Club Ground, Wimbledon, London

- No toss.
- No play possible due to rain.

1 May 2023
11:00 BST
Scorecard

Oxfordshire; 89/7 (20 overs)	v	Surrey; 90/2 (14.1 overs)
Carla Wood 29* (56); Claudie Cooper 3/12 (4 overs)		Amy Gordon 52 (46); Katie Waugh 1/9 (2.1 overs)

Surrey won by 8 wickets
Great & Little Tew CC, Great Tew

- Surrey won the toss and elected to field.
- Match rearranged from 16 April 2023.

1 May 2023
15:00 BST
Scorecard

Surrey; 126/8 (20 overs)	v	Oxfordshire; 97/7 (20 overs)
Charlotte Stubbs 26 (20); Katie Waugh 2/12 (4 overs)		Abi Norgrove 32 (37); Priya Khatkar 3/16 (4 overs)

Surrey won by 29 runs
Great & Little Tew CC, Great Tew
Umpires: Tony Lord and Yolanda Harris

- Oxfordshire won the toss and elected to field.
- Match rearranged from 16 April 2023.

8 May 2023
11:00 BST
Scorecard

Kent; 142/2 (20 overs)	v	Oxfordshire; 71/9 (20 overs)
Sarah Bryce 54* (35); Katie Waugh 2/14 (4 overs)		Katie Waugh 19 (23); Kalea Moore 4/10 (4 overs)

Kent won by 71 runs
Polo Farm, Canterbury
Umpires: Julia Jarvis and Mel Juniper

- Oxfordshire won the toss and elected to field.

8 May 2023
11:00 BST
Scorecard

Middlesex; 128/5 (20 overs)	v	Surrey; 78 (18.4 overs)
Saskia Horley 43* (37); Charlotte Stubbs 2/26 (4 overs)		Charlotte Stubbs 18 (23); Kate Coppack 3/11 (3.4 overs)

Middlesex won by 40 runs
Hornsey CC, Hornsey, London

- Surrey won the toss and elected to field.

8 May 2023
15:00 BST
Scorecard

Oxfordshire; 87/6 (20 overs)	v	Kent; 88/2 (11.4 overs)
Genevieve Porter 25 (37); Alice Grant 2/4 (2 overs)		Phoebe Franklin 53 (32); Eleanor Bath 1/8 (1 over)

Kent won by 8 wickets
Polo Farm, Canterbury
Umpires: Mel Juniper and Julia Jarvis

- Oxfordshire won the toss and elected to bat.

8 May 2023
15:00 BST
Scorecard

Middlesex; 85/8 (20 overs)	v	Surrey; 84/8 (20 overs)
Saskia Horley 36* (40); Priya Khatkar 3/13 (4 overs)		Izzy Berry 18 (27); Naomi Dattani 3/9 (2.4 overs)

Middlesex won by 1 run
Hornsey CC, Hornsey, London

- Middlesex won the toss and elected to bat.

==== Finals Day ====
Semi-Final
8 July 2023
10:30 BST
Scorecard

Middlesex; 110/5 (20 overs)	v	Oxfordshire; 26/2 (5.3 overs)
Sonali Patel 39 (33); Sophia Hanson 2/12 (3 overs)		Chloe Westbury 11 (18); Chloe Abel 1/4 (1 over)

Middlesex won by 6 runs (DLS)
Mill Hill School, Mill Hill

- Oxfordshire won the toss and elected to field.
- Match rearranged from 14 May 2023 due to rain.
- Oxfordshire innings curtailed at 5.3 overs by rain; target was 33.

Semi-Final
8 July 2023
13:30 BST
Scorecard

Kent	v	Surrey

Kent won by coin toss
Mill Hill School, Mill Hill

- No toss.
- Match rearranged from 14 May 2023 due to rain.
- No play possible due to rain; a coin toss determined the winner.

Final
8 July 2023
16:30 BST

Middlesex	v	Kent

Match Abandoned
Mill Hill School, Mill Hill

- No toss.
- Match rearranged from 14 May 2023 due to rain.
- No play possible due to rain.
- Group title was shared between Middlesex and Kent.

=== Group 7 ===
==== Group stage ====
16 April 2023
11:00 BST
Scorecard

Suffolk; 65/9 (20 overs)	v	Northamptonshire; 69/3 (9.3 overs)
Sophie Hughes 15 (21); Anje Lague 3/7 (4 overs)		Jodi Grewcock 44* (33); Isobel Sidhu 1/9 (2 overs)

Northamptonshire won by 7 wickets
Victory Ground, Bury St Edmunds
Umpires: Tom Smith and S Whitfield

- Northamptonshire won the toss and elected to field.

16 April 2023
15:00 BST
Scorecard

Northamptonshire; 143/3 (20 overs)	v	Suffolk; 82/7 (20 overs)
Florence Miller 46 (32); Sophie Hughes 1/28 (4 overs)		Sophie Singer 27 (30); Honor Austin 4/7 (4 overs)

Northamptonshire won by 61 runs
Victory Ground, Bury St Edmunds
Umpires: Tom Smith and S Whitfield

- Northamptonshire won the toss and elected to bat.

23 April 2023
11:00 BST
Scorecard

Northamptonshire; 102/7 (20 overs)	v	Hertfordshire; 103/5 (18.4 overs)
Hayley Brown 29 (46); Rebecca Tyson 4/8 (4 overs)		Gemma Marriott 38 (40); Josie Groves 2/21 (4 overs)

Hertfordshire won by 5 wickets
Geddington Sports Ground, Geddington

- Hertfordshire won the toss and elected to field.

23 April 2023
11:00 BST
Scorecard

Suffolk; 72/6 (20 overs)	v	Essex; 73/4 (15.2 overs)
Imogen Sidhu 13 (22); Esmae MacGregor 2/11 (4 overs)		Catherine Dalton 20 (22); Poppy Sidhu 2/13 (4 overs)

Essex won by 6 wickets
Victory Ground, Bury St Edmunds
Umpires: Tom Smith and S Whitfield

- Essex won the toss and elected to field.

23 April 2023
15:00 BST
Scorecard

Hertfordshire; 73 (19.1 overs)	v	Northamptonshire; 74/3 (13 overs)
Gemma Marriott 20 (16); Josie Groves 3/11 (3.1 overs)		Florence Miller 33* (38); Charley Phillips 1/10 (2 overs)

Northamptonshire won by 7 wickets
Geddington Sports Ground, Geddington

- Northamptonshire won the toss and elected to field.

23 April 2023
15:00 BST

Suffolk	v	Essex

Match Abandoned
Victory Ground, Bury St Edmunds

- No toss.
- No play possible due to rain.

6 May 2023
11:00 BST

Essex	v	Hertfordshire

Match Abandoned
Chigwell School, Chigwell

- Hertfordshire won the toss and elected to field.
- No play possible due to rain.
- Match rearranged from 16 April 2023.

6 May 2023
15:00 BST

Hertfordshire	v	Essex

Match Abandoned
Chigwell School, Chigwell

- No toss.
- No play possible due to rain.
- Match rearranged from 16 April 2023.

8 May 2023
11:00 BST
Scorecard

Northamptonshire; 68/9 (20 overs)	v	Essex; 69/5 (16.1 overs)
Rachael Potter 12* (15); Esmae MacGregor 2/5 (3 overs)		Grace Poole 17 (26); Josie Groves 3/7 (3.1 overs)

Essex won by 5 wickets
Billericay CC, Billericay

- Essex won the toss and elected to field.

8 May 2023
11:00 BST
Scorecard

Suffolk; 97/6 (20 overs)	v	Hertfordshire; 98/8 (18.3 overs)
Petra Tweedy 44* (64); Rebecca Tyson 1/12 (4 overs)		Kezie Hassall 22 (23); Maddie Reynolds 2/18 (4 overs)

Hertfordshire won by 2 wickets
Harlow CC, Harlow
Umpires: Rose Dovey and Anthony Levy

- Hertfordshire won the toss and elected to field.

8 May 2023
15:00 BST
Scorecard

Essex; 83/9 (20 overs)	v	Northamptonshire; 84/3 (18.3 overs)
Katherine Speed 20 (29); Josie Groves 2/11 (4 overs)		Jodi Grewcock 44* (49); Beth Dodd 1/8 (3 overs)

Northamptonshire won by 7 wickets
Billericay CC, Billericay

- Northamptonshire won the toss and elected to field.

8 May 2023
15:00 BST
Scorecard

Hertfordshire; 117/6 (20 overs)	v	Suffolk; 101/9 (20 overs)
Gemma Marriott 43 (38); Imogen Sidhu 4/12 (4 overs)		Emily Cunningham 26 (29); Rebecca Tyson 4/18 (4 overs)

Hertfordshire won by 16 runs
Harlow CC, Harlow
Umpires: Rose Dovey and Anthony Levy

- Hertfordshire won the toss and elected to bat.

==== Finals Day ====
Semi-Final
14 May 2023
10:30 BST
Scorecard

Northamptonshire; 155/3 (20 overs)	v	Suffolk; 76 (19.5 overs)
Josie Groves 68 (47); Imogen Sidhu 2/18 (4 overs)		Sophie Hughes 19 (16); Anje Lague 3/5 (4 overs)

Northamptonshire won by 79 runs
Felsted School, Felsted

- Suffolk won the toss and elected to field.

Semi-Final
14 May 2023
13:30 BST
Scorecard

Essex; 133/6 (20 overs)	v	Hertfordshire; 136/2 (16.4 overs)
Jessica Bird 32 (34); Rebecca Tyson 2/12 (4 overs)		Gemma Marriott 72 (46); Prisha Bedi 1/17 (4 overs)

Hertfordshire won by 8 wickets
Felsted School, Felsted

- Essex won the toss and elected to bat.

Final
14 May 2023
16:30 BST
Scorecard

Hertfordshire; 65 (19.3 overs)	v	Northamptonshire; 69/5 (12 overs)
Gemma Marriott 16 (28); Alicia Presland 3/8 (2.3 overs)		Jo Gardner 29* (21); Ella Phillips 2/17 (4 overs)

Northamptonshire won by 5 wickets
Felsted School, Felsted

- Northamptonshire won the toss and elected to field.

=== Group 8 ===
==== Group stage ====
16 April 2023
11:00 BST
Scorecard

Wales; 118/6 (20 overs)	v	Cornwall; 63/6 (20 overs)
Sophia Smale 34 (34); Hannah Dodd 3/18 (4 overs)		Rebecca Odgers 30 (42); Claire Nicholas 1/5 (3 overs)

Wales won by 55 runs
Elerkey Lane, Veryan

- Cornwall won the toss and elected to field.

16 April 2023
11:00 BST

Devon	v	Somerset

Match Abandoned
Heathcoat CC, Knightshayes Court, Bolham

- No toss.
- No play possible due to rain.

16 April 2023
15:00 BST
Scorecard

Wales; 111/5 (20 overs)	v	Cornwall; 49/8 (20 overs)
Lauren Parfitt 39 (52); Tegan Smith 2/22 (4 overs)		Robyn Edge 13 (23); Eve Jackson 4/5 (3 overs)

Wales won by 62 runs
Elerkey Lane, Veryan

- Wales won the toss and elected to bat.

16 April 2023
15:00 BST

Devon	v	Somerset

Match Abandoned
Heathcoat CC, Knightshayes Court, Bolham

- No toss.
- No play possible due to rain.

23 April 2023
11:00 BST
Scorecard

Devon; 73/9 (18 overs)	v	Wales
Amelie Munday 17 (14); Nicole Reid 2/12 (4 overs)

No Result
Spytty Park, Newport

- Wales won the toss and elected to field.
- No further play possible due to rain.

23 April 2023
11:00 BST

Somerset	v	Cornwall

Match Abandoned
Wells Cathedral School, Wells

- No toss.
- No play possible due to rain.

23 April 2023
15:00 BST

Wales	v	Devon

Match Abandoned
Spytty Park, Newport

- No toss.
- No play possible due to rain.

23 April 2023
15:00 BST

Somerset	v	Cornwall

Match Abandoned
Wells Cathedral School, Wells

- No toss.
- No play possible due to rain.

8 May 2023
11:00 BST

Cornwall	v	Devon

Match Abandoned
Wadebridge CC, Wadebridge

- No toss.
- No play possible due to rain.

8 May 2023
11:00 BST

Wales	v	Somerset

Match Abandoned
Ynystawe CC, Ynystawe, Swansea

- No toss.
- No play possible due to rain.

8 May 2023
15:00 BST

Cornwall	v	Devon

Match Abandoned
Wadebridge CC, Wadebridge

- No toss.
- No play possible due to rain.

8 May 2023
15:00 BST

Wales	v	Somerset

Match Abandoned
Ynystawe CC, Ynystawe, Swansea

- No toss.
- No play possible due to rain.

==== Finals Day ====
Semi-Final
14 May 2023
10:30 BST
Scorecard

Wales; 124/4 (20 overs)	v	Cornwall; 64/8 (20 overs)
Bethan Gammon 45* (31); Isabelle Peacock 3/12 (4 overs)		Keira De Villiers 16 (13); Claire Nicholas 2/9 (4 overs)

Wales won by 60 runs
Taunton Vale Sports Club Ground, Taunton

- Wales won the toss and elected to bat.

Semi-Final
14 May 2023
10:30 BST
Scorecard

Devon; 95/7 (20 overs)	v	Somerset; 96/3 (16.1 overs)
Emma Corney 31 (29); Nicole Harvey 2/11 (4 overs)		Nat Wraith 45 (28); Hollie Perkin 2/11 (2.1 overs)

Somerset won by 7 wickets
Taunton Vale Sports Club Ground, Taunton

- Somerset won the toss and elected to field.

3rd Place Play-off
14 May 2023
14:45 BST
Scorecard

Devon; 100/7 (20 overs)	v	Cornwall; 96/7 (20 overs)
Erin Vukusic 31* (25); Tegan Smith 2/6 (4 overs)		Caitlin Burnett 48* (60); Ellie Bishop 3/13 (3 overs)

Devon won by 4 runs
County Ground, Taunton

- Cornwall won the toss and elected to field.

Final
14 May 2023
18:15 BST
Scorecard

Wales; 117/4 (20 overs)	v	Somerset; 121/1 (12 overs)
Lauren Parfitt 62 (61); Emily Edgcombe 4/12 (4 overs)		Daisy Jeanes 44* (34); Ffion Wynne 1/25 (3 overs)

Somerset won by 9 wickets
County Ground, Taunton

- Somerset won the toss and elected to field.

== Statistics ==
=== Most runs ===
Player	Team	Matches	Innings	Runs	Average	HS	100s	50s
Gemma Marriott	Hertfordshire	6	6	203	33.83	72	0	1
Seren Smale	Lancashire	4	4	201	67.00	121*	1	1
Emily Windsor	Hampshire	4	4	177	59.00	85	0	2
Ailsa Lister	Scotland	4	3	172	86.00	117*	1	0
Isla Thomson	Wiltshire	3	3	143	71.50	62	0	1

Source: CricketArchive

=== Most wickets ===
Player	Team	Overs	Wickets	Average	BBI	5w
Bhoomika Bhat	Gloucestershire	19.0	12	3.50	4/15	0
Rebecca Tyson	Hertfordshire	20.0	12	5.33	4/8	0
Melissa Story	Gloucestershire	16.0	11	5.00	2/4	0
Eve O'Neill	Hampshire	18.0	11	5.81	4/13	0
Anje Lague	Northamptonshire	27.0	11	8.90	3/5	0

Source: CricketArchive
