= 2020 South East Stars season =

English women's domestic cricket season

South East Stars
2020 season
- Coach: Jonathan Batty
- Captain: Tash Farrant
- RHFT: South Group, 3rd
- Most runs: Alice Capsey (141)
- Most wickets: Tash Farrant (9)
- Most catches: Alice Davidson-Richards (3); Hannah Jones (3); Alice Capsey (3); Aylish Cranstone (3); Tash Farrant (3)
- Most wicket-keeping dismissals: Rhianna Southby (4)

The 2020 season was South East Stars' first season, in which they competed in the 50 over Rachael Heyhoe Flint Trophy following reforms to the structure of women's domestic cricket in England. The side finished third in the South Group of the competition, winning two of their six matches.

After the ending of the Women's Cricket Super League in 2019, the ECB announced the beginning of a new "women's elite domestic structure". Eight teams were included in this new structure, with South East Stars being one of the new teams, replacing Surrey Stars and representing London and South East England. Due to the impact of the COVID-19 pandemic, only the Rachael Heyhoe Flint Trophy was able to take place. South East Stars were captained by Tash Farrant and coached by Jonathan Batty. They played two of their home matches at the County Ground, Beckenham and one at The Oval.

== Squad ==
South East Stars named their squad for the season on 18 August 2020. Age given is at the start of South East Stars' first match of the season (29 August 2020).

Name	Nationality	Birth date	Batting Style	Bowling Style	Notes
Batters
Maxine Blythin	England	25 August 1994 (aged 26)	Right-handed	–	
Aylish Cranstone	England	28 August 1994 (aged 26)	Left-handed	Left-arm medium	
Phoebe Franklin	England	18 February 1998 (aged 22)	Right-handed	Right-arm medium	
Susie Rowe	England	14 April 1987 (aged 33)	Right-handed	Right-arm medium	
Kirstie White	England	14 March 1988 (aged 32)	Right-handed	Right-arm medium	
All-rounders
Chloe Brewer	England	12 July 2002 (aged 18)	Right-handed	Right-arm medium	
Alice Capsey	England	11 August 2004 (aged 16)	Right-handed	Right-arm off break	
Alice Davidson-Richards	England	29 May 1994 (aged 26)	Right-handed	Right-arm fast-medium	
Sophia Dunkley	England	16 July 1998 (aged 22)	Right-handed	Right-arm leg break	
Hannah Jones	England	21 July 1999 (aged 21)	Right-handed	Right-arm off break	
Bryony Smith	England	12 December 1997 (aged 22)	Right-handed	Right-arm off break	
Wicket-keepers
Rhianna Southby	England	16 October 2000 (aged 19)	Right-handed	—	
Bowlers
Megan Belt	England	6 October 1997 (aged 22)	Right-handed	Right-arm off break	
Freya Davies	England	27 October 1995 (aged 24)	Right-handed	Right-arm fast-medium	
Tash Farrant ‡	England	29 May 1996 (aged 24)	Left-handed	Left-arm medium	Captain
Grace Gibbs	England	1 May 1995 (aged 25)	Right-handed	Right-arm medium	
Amy Gordon	England	3 October 2001 (aged 18)	Right-handed	Right-arm medium	
Eva Gray	England	24 May 2000 (aged 20)	Right-handed	Right-arm medium	
Danielle Gregory	England	4 December 1998 (aged 21)	Right-handed	Right-arm leg break	

== Rachael Heyhoe Flint Trophy ==
=== South Group ===
Pos	Team	Pld	W	L	T	NR	BP	Pts	NRR
1	Southern Vipers	6	6	0	0	0	3	27	1.017
2	Western Storm	6	4	2	0	0	2	18	0.510
3	South East Stars	6	2	4	0	0	2	10	−0.197
4	Sunrisers	6	0	6	0	0	0	0	−1.365

Source: ESPN Cricinfo

Advanced to the Final.

=== Fixtures ===
29 August 2020
10:30 BST
Scorecard

South East Stars; 166 (48.1 overs)	v	Western Storm; 167/4 (39.5 overs)
Susie Rowe 38 (44); Georgia Hennessy 4/31 (8.1 overs)		Heather Knight 91* (99); Bryony Smith 1/11 (4 overs)

Western Storm won by 6 wickets
County Cricket Ground, Beckenham
Umpires: Sarah Bartlett and Nigel Llong

- Western Storm won the toss and elected to field.
- Points: Western Storm 5, South East Stars 0

31 August 2020
10:30 BST
Scorecard

South East Stars; 289/8 (50 overs)	v	Sunrisers; 212 (45.5 overs)
Sophia Dunkley 97 (116); Sonali Patel 4/52 (10 overs)		Amara Carr 99 (113); Bryony Smith 3/25 (5.5 overs)

South East Stars won by 77 runs
County Cricket Ground, Beckenham
Umpires: Sophie McLelland and Nigel Llong

- South East Stars won the toss and elected to bat.
- Points: South East Stars 5, Sunrisers 0

5 September 2020
10:30 BST
Scorecard

Southern Vipers; 209/8 (50 overs)	v	South East Stars; 98 (36.5 overs)
Ella McCaughan 50 (81); Tash Farrant 2/28 (10 overs)		Aylish Cranstone 28 (50); Tara Norris 3/27 (8.5 overs)

Southern Vipers won by 111 runs
County Ground, Hove
Umpires: Mark Newell and Sarah Bartlett

- Southern Vipers won the toss and elected to bat.
- Points: Southern Vipers 5, South East Stars 0

11 September 2020
10:30 BST
Scorecard

South East Stars; 212/9 (50 overs)	v	Western Storm; 215/3 (46.1 overs)
Kirstie White 50 (77); Georgia Hennessy 3/40 (10 overs)		Sophie Luff 104* 104 (133); Tash Farrant 1/28 (7 overs)

Western Storm won by 7 wickets
County Ground, Bristol
Umpires: Fiona Richards and Mark Newell

- South East Stars won the toss and elected to bat.
- Points: Western Storm 4, South East Stars 0

13 September 2020
10:30 BST
Scorecard

Sunrisers; 198 (48.4 overs)	v	South East Stars; 199/4 (37.1 overs)
Naomi Dattani 33 (41); Tash Farrant 3/24 (9.4 overs)		Alice Capsey 73* (75); Jo Gardner 2/13 (4 overs)

South East Stars won by 6 wickets
County Ground, Chelmsford
Umpires: Fiona Richards and Chris Watts

- Sunrisers won the toss and elected to bat.
- Points: South East Stars 5, Sunrisers 0

19 September 2020
10:30 BST
Scorecard

South East Stars; 227 (48.3 overs)	v	Southern Vipers; 230/6 (47.2 overs)
Chloe Brewer 79 (107); Lauren Bell 4/36 (10 overs)		Emily Windsor 47* (43); Danielle Gregory 3/44 (10 overs)

Southern Vipers won by 4 wickets
The Oval, London
Umpires: Ben Debenham and Anna Harris

- South East Stars won the toss and elected to bat.
- Points: Southern Vipers 4, South East Stars 0

== Statistics ==
=== Batting ===
Player	Matches	Innings	NO	Runs	HS	Average	Strike rate	100s	50s	4s	6s
Megan Belt	2	2	1	5	5*	5.00	71.42	0	0	1	0
Maxine Blythin	2	2	0	56	50	28.00	50.45	0	1	3	0
Chloe Brewer	2	2	0	119	79	59.50	76.28	0	1	17	0
Alice Capsey	6	6	1	141	73*	28.20	64.67	0	1	17	0
Aylish Cranstone	6	6	0	116	46	19.33	60.41	0	0	11	0
Alice Davidson-Richards	3	3	0	71	61	23.66	69.60	0	1	6	0
Freya Davies	2	2	1	14	12	14.00	26.92	0	0	1	0
Sophia Dunkley	2	2	0	102	97	51.00	82.92	0	1	13	0
Tash Farrant	6	5	0	86	37	17.20	65.64	0	0	7	0
Phoebe Franklin	2	1	0	22	22	22.00	57.89	0	0	2	0
Grace Gibbs	4	3	1	36	30	18.00	124.13	0	0	3	2
Amy Gordon	3	3	1	9	7	4.50	23.07	0	0	1	0
Eva Gray	2	2	0	4	3	2.00	25.00	0	0	0	0
Danielle Gregory	2	1	0	0	0	0.00	0.00	0	0	0	0
Hannah Jones	6	5	0	74	28	14.80	62.18	0	0	7	0
Suzie Rowe	4	4	1	79	39	26.33	71.17	0	0	10	0
Bryony Smith	3	3	0	17	8	5.66	62.96	0	0	3	0
Rhianna Southby	6	5	3	32	10*	16.00	74.41	0	0	3	0
Kirstie White	3	3	0	65	50	21.66	57.52	0	1	10	0
Source: ESPN Cricinfo

=== Bowling ===
Player	Matches	Innings	Overs	Maidens	Runs	Wickets	BBI	Average	Economy	Strike rate
Megan Belt	2	2	17.0	1	82	2	1/39	41.00	4.82	51.0
Chloe Brewer	2	2	8.0	1	38	1	2/16	38.00	4.75	48.0
Alice Capsey	6	5	35.0	1	146	2	1/14	73.00	4.17	105.0
Alice Davidson-Richards	3	3	12.0	0	64	1	1/18	64.00	5.33	72.0
Freya Davies	2	2	15.0	2	63	0	–	–	4.20	–
Sophia Dunkley	2	2	15.0	0	61	3	2/34	20.33	4.06	30.0
Tash Farrant	6	6	52.0	9	177	9	3/24	19.66	3.40	34.6
Grace Gibbs	4	4	11.0	0	72	0	–	–	6.54	–
Amy Gordon	3	3	17.1	1	87	1	1/22	87.00	5.06	103.0
Eva Gray	2	2	11.0	0	56	2	2/33	28.00	5.09	33.0
Danielle Gregory	2	2	20.0	0	74	5	3/44	14.80	3.70	24.0
Hannah Jones	6	6	52.5	1	232	7	2/34	33.14	4.39	45.2
Bryony Smith	3	3	11.5	1	52	4	3/25	13.00	4.39	17.7
Source: ESPN Cricinfo

=== Fielding ===
Player	Matches	Innings	Catches
Megan Belt	2	2	0
Maxine Blythin	2	2	1
Chloe Brewer	2	2	0
Alice Capsey	6	6	3
Aylish Cranstone	6	6	3
Alice Davidson-Richards	3	3	3
Freya Davies	2	2	0
Sophia Dunkley	2	2	1
Tash Farrant	6	6	3
Phoebe Franklin	2	2	0
Grace Gibbs	4	4	1
Amy Gordon	3	3	2
Eva Gray	2	2	0
Danielle Gregory	2	2	0
Hannah Jones	6	6	3
Suzie Rowe	4	4	0
Bryony Smith	3	3	0
Kirstie White	3	3	0
Source: ESPN Cricinfo

=== Wicket-keeping ===
Player	Matches	Innings	Catches	Stumpings
Rhianna Southby	6	6	1	3
Source: ESPN Cricinfo
