= Neil Hames =

English cricketer (born 1949)

Personal information
- Full name: Neil Gregory Hames
- Born: 17 December 1949 (age 76); Hampstead, London, England
- Batting: Left-handed
- Bowling: Right-arm medium
- Relatives: Greg Hames (son)

Domestic team information
- Years: Team
- 1977–1993: Buckinghamshire

Career statistics
Competition	List A
Matches	7
Runs scored	44
Batting average	6.28
100s/50s	–/–
Top score	12
Balls bowled	–
Wickets	–
Bowling average	–
5 wickets in innings	–
10 wickets in match	–
Best bowling	–
Catches/stumpings	1/–
- Source: Cricinfo, 5 May 2011

Neil Gregory Hames (born 7 December 1949) is a former English cricketer. Hames was a left-handed batsman who bowled right-arm medium pace.

Hames was born in Hampstead, London. He made his debut for Buckinghamshire in the 1977 Minor Counties Championship against Oxfordshire. Hames played Minor counties cricket for Buckinghamshire from 1977 to 1993, which included 110 Minor Counties Championship matches and 20 MCCA Knockout Trophy matches. In 1984, he made his List A debut against Lancashire in the NatWest Trophy. He played 6 further List A matches for Buckinghamshire, the last of which came against Somerset in the 1991 NatWest Trophy. In his 7 List A matches, he scored 44 runs at a batting average of 6.28, with a high score of 12.

His son Greg Hames has also played for Buckinghamshire.
