= Timothy Russell =

Timothy Russell may refer to:

- Timothy Peter Russell, cricketer
- Killing of Timothy Russell and Malissa Williams
