= Malcolm Roberts =

Malcolm Roberts may refer to:

- Malcolm Roberts (cricketer) (born 1960), English cricketer
- Malcolm Roberts (politician) (born 1955), Australian politician
- Malcolm Roberts (singer) (1944–2003), English traditional pop singer
