= John Slack =

John Slack may refer to:

- John M. Slack Jr. (1915–1980), American politician from West Virginia
- John Bamford Slack (1857–1909), British politician
- John Slack (cricketer) (1930–2012), English cricketer and judge
