= Paul Sawyer =

Paul Sawyer may refer to:

- Paul Sawyer (cricketer)
- Paul Sawyer (politician)

== See also ==
- Paul Sawyier (1865–1917), American impressionist painter
