= Drepaul =

Drepaul is a surname. Notable people with the surname include:

- Daniel Drepaul (born 1975), English cricketer
- Sauid Drepaul (born 1985), Surinamese cricketer
