= Richard Hurd =

Richard Hurd may refer to:

- Richard Hurd (bishop) (1720–1808), Anglican bishop of Worcester
- Richard Hurd (educator), American academic and labor union scholar
- Richard Melancthon Hurd (1865–1941), American real estate banker and political activist
- Richard Hurd (cricketer) (born 1970), English cricketer

== See also ==
- Richard Herd (1932–2020), American actor
