= List of people from Islamabad =

This is a list of notable people who are the subject of a Wikipedia article and were born in or are associated with Islamabad, Pakistan.

== Politics ==
- Nayyar Hussain Bukhari – former chairman of the Senate of Pakistan
- Anjum Aqeel Khan – politician
- Jamshed Ayaz Khan – major general (Pakistan Army)
- Tridev Roy – politician and writer
- Wasim Sajjad – former chairman of the Senate of Pakistan
- Asad Umar – former finance minister

== Sports ==
- Zeeshan Abbasi – blind cricketer
- Shoaib Akhtar – cricketer
- Usman Khawaja – Australian cricketer
- Muhammad Musa – cricketer
- Muhammad Qasim – footballer
- Ijaz-ur-Rehman – ten-pin bowler
- Adnan Saleem – cricketer
- Imad Wasim – cricketer

== Media and entertainment ==
- Imran Abbas – singer and actor
- Hamza Ali Abbasi – actor, director and producer
- Kashif Abbasi – journalist and news anchor
- Zahid Ahmed – actor and former RJ
- Tariq Amin – hairdresser and stylist
- Osman Khalid Butt – actor and writer
- Faakhir – musician
- Hareem Farooq – producer and actor
- Mawra Hocane – actress and lawyer
- Urwa Hocane – VJ, actress and producer
- Talat Hussain – journalist
- Yasir Hussain – actor and host
- Madiha Iftikhar – TV actress and model
- Shamoon Ismail – singer, songwriter and composer
- Umair Jaswal – singer and actor
- Uzair Jaswal – singer and actor
- Yasir Jaswal – director
- Ali Rehman Khan – actor
- Khushhal Khan – singer and actor
- Nadia Khan – morning show host, actor, vlogger and producer
- Shamil Khan – film and TV actor
- Zarnish Khan – actor
- Usman Mukhtar – director, actor and cinematographer
- Momina Mustehsan – singer
- Mariyam Nafees – actor
- Adil Omar – musician and rapper
- Yasra Rizvi – director, actor and writer
- Rumer – musician and songwriter
- Saleem Safi – journalist and columnist
- Farah Sadia – Host and actress
- Ali Saleem – TV actor and host
- Farrukh Saleem – journalist and columnist
- Asma Shirazi – journalist
- Marvi Sirmed – journalist and columnist

== Sciences and literature ==
- Zaheer Ahmad – physician and philanthropist
- Zafar Ishaq Ansari – Muslim scholar
- Muhammad Asim Butt – Urdu novelist
- Ahmad Hasan Dani – archaeologist and historian
- Abdul Rashid – nuclear and bio-scientist
- Rahman Syed – entomologist and professor
- Mansha Yaad – writer

== Other ==
- Abdul Rashid Ghazi – religious cleric and vice-chancellor of Faridia University, Islamabad
- Sadruddin Hashwani – businessman
- Julius Salik – activist
