= Mark Morgan (cricketer) =

English cricketer (born 1980)

Mark Morgan (born 24 May 1980) was an English cricketer. He was a right-handed batsman and leg-break bowler who played for Buckinghamshire. He was born in Ascot.

Morgan made a single List A appearance for the side, during the 2000 NatWest Trophy season, against Wales Minor Counties. From the lower order, he scored 2 runs.
