= Simon Shearman =

English cricketer (born 1964)

Personal information
- Full name: Simon Max Shearman
- Born: 13 November 1964 (age 61); Aylesbury, Buckinghamshire, England
- Batting: Left-handed

Domestic team information
- Years: Team
- 1988–1996: Buckinghamshire
- Source: Cricinfo, 3 May 2011

Simon Max Shearman (born 13 November 1964) is a former English cricketer. Shearman was a left-handed batsman. He was born in Aylesbury, Buckinghamshire.

Shearman made his debut for Buckinghamshire in the 1988 Minor Counties Championship against Wales Minor Counties. Shearman played Minor counties cricket for Buckinghamshire from 1988 to 1996, which included 42 Minor Counties Championship matches at an average of 34.2 and 12 MCCA Knockout Trophy matches. He made two List A appearances for Buckinghamshire, against Sussex in the 1992 NatWest Trophy and Leicestershire in the 1993 NatWest Trophy. In these two List A matches, >
