= Bruce Percy =

English cricketer

Personal information
- Full name: Bruce Stephen Percy
- Born: 15 June 1966 (age 60); Horsforth, Yorkshire, England
- Batting: Right-handed
- Bowling: Right-arm medium

Domestic team information
- Years: Team
- 1986–2001: Buckinghamshire

Career statistics
| Competition | List A |
|---|---|
| Matches | 8 |
| Runs scored | 59 |
| Batting average | 8.42 |
| 100s/50s | –/– |
| Top score | 19 |
| Balls bowled | 126 |
| Wickets | 3 |
| Bowling average | 27.66 |
| 5 wickets in innings | – |
| 10 wickets in match | – |
| Best bowling | 1/2 |
| Catches/stumpings | 2/– |
- Source: Cricinfo, 4 May 2011

Bruce Stephen Percy (born 15 June 1966) is a former English cricketer. Percy was a right-handed batsman who bowled right-arm medium pace. He was born in Horsforth, Yorkshire.

Percy made his debut for Buckinghamshire in the 1986 Minor Counties Championship against Berkshire. Percy played Minor counties cricket for Buckinghamshire from 1986 to 2001, which included 50 Minor Counties Championship matches and 20 MCCA Knockout Trophy matches. In 1990, he made his List A debut against Nottinghamshire in the NatWest Trophy. He played 7 further List A matches for Buckinghamshire, the last coming against the Kent Cricket Board in the 2001 Cheltenham & Gloucester Trophy. In his 8 List A matches, he scored 59 runs at a batting average of 8.42, with a high score of 19. With the ball he took 3 wickets at a bowling average of 27.66, with best figures of 1/2.
