= David Mackintosh (cricketer) =

Scottish cricketer

Personal information
- Full name: David Stewart Mackintosh
- Born: 18 February 1947 (age 79); Paisley, Renfrewshire, Scotland
- Batting: Right-handed

International information
- National side: Scotland

Domestic team information
- Years: Team
- 1973: Minor Counties South
- 1971–1976: Buckinghamshire

Career statistics
Competition	First-class	List A
Matches	1	4
Runs scored	66	35
Batting average	33.00	8.75
100s/50s	–/1	–/–
Top score	57	14
Balls bowled	–	–
Wickets	–	–
Bowling average	–	–
5 wickets in innings	–	–
10 wickets in match	–	–
Best bowling	–	–
Catches/stumpings	–/–	2/–
- Source: Cricinfo, 6 May 2011

David Stewart Mackintosh (born 18 February 1947) is a former Scottish cricketer. Mackintosh was a right-handed batsman.

Mackintosh made his debut for Buckinghamshire in the 1971 Minor Counties Championship against Norfolk. Mackintosh played Minor counties cricket for Buckinghamshire from 1971 to 1979, which included 43 Minor Counties Championship matches. In 1972, he made his List A debut against Glamorgan in the Gillette Cup. He played two further List A matches, the last coming against Middlesex in the 1975 Gillette Cup. He also played a single List A match for Minor Counties South against Hampshire in the 1973 Benson & Hedges Cup. In his four List A matches, he scored 35 runs at a batting average of 8.75, with a high score of 14.

Mackintosh made a single first-class appearance for Scotland against Ireland in 1972. In Scotland's first-innings he scored 57 runs before being dismissed by Dermott Monteith. In their second-innings he scored 9 runs before being dismissed by Patrick Hughes, with the match ending in a draw.
