= David Smith (cricketer, born 1945) =

English cricketer

Personal information
- Full name: David Embleton Smith
- Born: 18 November 1945 (age 80); Harpenden, Hertfordshire, England
- Batting: Right-handed
- Bowling: Right-arm medium

Domestic team information
- Years: Team
- 1967–1988: Buckinghamshire

Career statistics
Competition	List A
Matches	6
Runs scored	112
Batting average	22.40
100s/50s	–/1
Top score	54
Balls bowled	3
Wickets	–
Bowling average	–
5 wickets in innings	–
10 wickets in match	–
Best bowling	–
Catches/stumpings	4/–
- Source: Cricinfo, 5 May 2011

David Embleton Smith (born 18 November 1945) is a former English cricketer. Smith was a right-handed batsman who bowled right-arm medium pace. He was born in Harpenden, Hertfordshire.

Smith made his debut for Buckinghamshire in the 1967 Minor Counties Championship against Hertfordshire. Smith played Minor counties cricket for Buckinghamshire from 1967 to 1988, which included 143 Minor Counties Championship matches and 9 MCCA Knockout Trophy matches. In 1974, he made his List A debut against Kent in the Gillette Cup. He played 5 further List A matches for Buckinghamshire, the last coming against Warwickshire in the 1987 NatWest Trophy. In his 6 List A matches, he scored 112 runs at a batting average of 22.40, with a single half century high score of 54. This came against Lancashire in the 1984 NatWest Trophy.
