= David Taylor (English cricketer) =

English cricketer

Personal information
- Full name: David Kenneth Taylor
- Born: 17 December 1974 (age 51); Oxford, England
- Batting: Left-handed
- Bowling: Right arm medium-fast

Domestic team information
- Years: Team
- 2001: Oxfordshire
- 2002: Buckinghamshire
- 2003: Worcestershire
- 2004: Berkshire
- 2004: Derbyshire

Career statistics
Competition	List A	Twenty20
Matches	8	7
Runs scored	202	82
Batting average	28.85	11.71
100s/50s	1/0	0/0
Top score	140	46
Balls bowled	72	–
Wickets	0	–
Bowling average	–	–
5 wickets in innings	–	–
10 wickets in match	–	–
Best bowling	–	–
Catches/stumpings	3/–	3/–
- Source: Cricinfo, 17 September 2009

David Kenneth Taylor (born 17 December 1974) is an English cricketer. He was born in Oxford.

Taylor played for Hampshire's Second XI in 1993 at the age of 18, and the following year captained a National Association of Young Cricketers side against Minor Counties. He had a further outing for Gloucestershire seconds in 1995, but then dropped out of view for a while. In 1998 he played for Oxfordshire in the MCC Trophy, and three years later still he at last made his List A debut for the same county, against Huntingdonshire in the C&G Trophy at Vicarage Hill in East Challow (the only List A game ever played on that ground). It was not a happy occasion for Taylor: he made only 1 and Oxfordshire lost by 77 runs.

Taylor's next List A game, in the first round of the same competition in August 2002 (though because of the vagaries of the fixture list, this was in fact the start of the 2003 competition), saw him playing for Buckinghamshire, and making by far his highest score at this level: 140 in a huge total of 424/5 which set up a crushing 230-run triumph over Suffolk at Dinton. He also played in Buckinghamshire's much closer (11-run) victory over Shropshire in the second round in September.

For the 2003 season Taylor was signed by Worcestershire with an eye to the first season of the Twenty20 Cup. His first innings was exactly what the county had been hoping for: opening the batting he produced a whirlwind knock of 46 from 20 balls, making a major contribution towards Worcestershire's nail-biting one-wicket victory over Northamptonshire. Unfortunately for him, single-figure scores in three further Twenty20 (and one National League) match spelt the end for him at New Road.

In 2004, after a few games for Berkshire, Taylor was picked up by Derbyshire to play exclusively one-day cricket for the rest of the season; Derbyshire's coach David Houghton had played with Taylor in club cricket and admired his hard hitting. However, he was not a success, with the only innings of real note being 29 against Middlesex in the totesport League: here he added 69 with Hassan Adnan after Derbyshire had slumped to 48/3. This proved to be Taylor's final innings for the county, however, since he was sacked by Houghton, who said that he had expected "fireworks rather than Polyfilla".

Since then, Taylor has not played at the highest level of the domestic game, although he did appear in a minor match for Minor Counties against Marylebone Cricket Club (MCC) and for Surrey's second team against MCC Young Cricketers, both in 2005.

Following many years of successful club cricket, he set a world record in adult 50-over cricket by scoring 330 not out in just 160 balls for Totton & Eling cricket club on 5 May 2012. The number of sixes in the innings, 31, is also believed to be a world record.
