= Willie Williams (cricketer) =

English cricketer

Willie Williams (born John Michael Williams on 11 June 1941) was an English cricketer. He was a right-handed batsman and right-arm medium-fast bowler who played for Buckinghamshire. He was born in Stourport-on-Severn.

Williams, who represented Buckinghamshire in the Minor Counties Championship in 1972, made a single List A appearance for the side during the same season, against Cambridgeshire. from the lower-middle order, he scored a duck in the only innings in which he batted.
