= Kelvin Locke =

English cricketer

Personal information
- Full name: Kelvin John Locke
- Born: 4 October 1980 (age 46); Northampton, Northamptonshire, England
- Batting: Right-handed
- Bowling: Slow left-arm orthodox
- Role: Wicket-keeper

Domestic team information
- Years: Team
- 1998–2003: Buckinghamshire

Career statistics
Competition	List A
Matches	6
Runs scored	54
Batting average	13.50
100s/50s	–/–
Top score	41
Balls bowled	–
Wickets	–
Bowling average	–
5 wickets in innings	–
10 wickets in match	–
Best bowling	–
Catches/stumpings	6/3
- Source: Cricinfo, 28 April 2011

Kelvin John Locke (born 4 October 1980) is an English cricketer. Locke is a right-handed batsman who plays as a wicket-keeper, can also bowl slow left-arm orthodox. He was born in Northampton, Northamptonshire and educated at Bedford Modern School.

Locke made his debut for Buckinghamshire in the 1998 Minor Counties Championship against Suffolk. Locke played Minor counties cricket for Buckinghamshire from 1998 to 2003, which included 29 Minor Counties Championship matches and 13 MCCA Knockout Trophy matches. In 1999, he made his List A debut against the Yorkshire Cricket Board in the NatWest Trophy. He played four further List A matches for Buckinghamshire, the last coming against Gloucestershire in the 2003 Cheltenham & Gloucester Trophy. In his six List A matches, he scored 54 runs at a batting average of 13.50, with a high score of 41. Behind the stumps he took 6 catches and made 3 stumpings.

He also played Second XI cricket for the Northamptonshire Second XI in 2000.
