= Anthony Waite =

English cricketer

Personal information
- Full name: Anthony Charles Waite
- Born: 29 May 1943 (age 83); Pinner, Middlesex, England
- Batting: Right-handed
- Bowling: Right-arm fast-medium

Domestic team information
- Years: Team
- 1965–1970: Buckinghamshire
- 1962–1964: Middlesex
- 1962: Marylebone Cricket Club

Career statistics
Competition	First-class	List A
Matches	12	5
Runs scored	58	9
Batting average	9.66	4.50
100s/50s	–/–	–/–
Top score	29	8
Balls bowled	1,672	294
Wickets	18	2
Bowling average	38.38	94.00
5 wickets in innings	–	–
10 wickets in match	–	–
Best bowling	4/25	1/46
Catches/stumpings	1/–	1/–
- Source: Cricinfo, 7 May 2011

Anthony Charles Waite (born 29 May 1943) is a former English cricketer. Waite was a right-handed batsman who bowled right-arm fast-medium. He was born in Pinner, Middlesex.

Waite made his first-class debut for the Marylebone Cricket Club against Cambridge University in 1962. Later that season he made his debut for Middlesex in a first-class match against Lancashire in the County Championship. He played 10 further first-class matches for Middlesex, the last coming against Worcestershire. In his 11 first-class matches for Middlesex, he took 17 wickets at a bowling average of 35.88, with best figures of 4/25. It was for Middlesex that he made his List A debut for, against Surrey in the 1964 Gillette Cup.

He later played for Buckinghamshire, making his debut for the county in the 1950 Minor Counties Championship against Hertfordshire. Waite played Minor counties cricket for Buckinghamshire from 1965 to 1974, which included 61 Minor Counties Championship matches. He made his List A debut for Buckinghamshire against Middlesex in the 1965 Gillette Cup. He played 3 further List A matches, the last coming against Hampshire in the 1970 Gillette Cup. He played 4 List A matches for Buckinghamshire, taking 2 wickets at an expensive average of 81.50, with best figures of 1/46.
