= Matthew Eyles =

English cricketer

Personal information
- Full name: Matthew James Eyles
- Born: 1 May 1979 (age 47); Amersham, Buckinghamshire, England
- Batting: Left-handed
- Bowling: Slow left-arm orthodox

Domestic team information
- Years: Team
- 1999–present: Buckinghamshire

Career statistics
Competition	List A
Matches	2
Runs scored	5
Batting average	2.50
100s/50s	–/–
Top score	5
Balls bowled	–
Wickets	–
Bowling average	–
5 wickets in innings	–
10 wickets in match	–
Best bowling	–
Catches/stumpings	–/–
- Source: Cricinfo, 27 April 2011

Matthew James Eyles (born 1 May 1979) is an English cricketer. Eyles is a left-handed batsman who bowls slow left-arm orthodox. He was born in Amersham, Buckinghamshire.

Eyles made his debut for Buckinghamshire in the 1999 Minor Counties Championship against Bedfordshire. He has played Minor counties cricket for Buckinghamshire from 1999 to present, which has included 28 Minor Counties Championship matches and 9 MCCA Knockout Trophy matches. He made his List A debut in the 2001 Cheltenham & Gloucester Trophy against the Kent Cricket Board. In this match he scored 5 runs before being dismissed by Eddie Stanford. He played one further List A matches for Buckinghamshire, against Dorset in the 1st round of the 2004 Cheltenham & Gloucester Trophy which was held in 2003. In this match he was dismissed for a duck by Reginald Keates, leaving him with a List A batting average of 2.50.
