= Christopher Booden =

English cricketer

Personal information
- Full name: Christopher Derek Booden
- Born: 2 June 1961 (age 65); Newport Pagnell, Buckinghamshire, England
- Batting: Right-handed
- Bowling: Right-arm medium

Domestic team information
- Years: Team
- 1983–1994: Buckinghamshire
- 1980–1981: Northamptonshire

Career statistics
Competition	First-class	List A
Matches	4	8
Runs scored	10	3
Batting average	10.00	1.50
100s/50s	–/–	–/–
Top score	6*	3
Balls bowled	510	394
Wickets	3	4
Bowling average	86.00	64.00
5 wickets in innings	–	–
10 wickets in match	–	–
Best bowling	2/30	1/12
Catches/stumpings	2/–	4/–
- Source: Cricinfo, 4 May 2011

Christopher Derek Booden (born 22 June 1961) is a former English cricketer. Booden was a right-handed batsman who bowled right-arm medium pace. He was born in Newport Pagnell, Buckinghamshire.

Booden made his first-class debut for Northamptonshire in the 1980 County Championship against Derbyshire. He played three further first-class matches for Northamptonshire, the last coming against Derbyshire. He took 3 wickets for Northamptonshire in first-class cricket at an expensive average of 86.00, with best figures of 2/30. It was for Northamptonshire that he made his debut in List A cricket against Kent in the 1981 John Player League. He played two further List A matches for Northamptonshire, both coming in that competition.

Booden joined Buckinghamshire in the 1983, making his debut in the Minor Counties Championship against the Somerset Second XI. He played Minor counties cricket for Buckinghamshire from 1983 to 1994, which included 67 Minor Counties Championship matches and 19 MCCA Knockout Trophy matches. He made his List A debut for Buckinghamshire against Somerset in the 1987 NatWest Trophy. He played four further List A matches for Buckinghamshire, the last coming against Leicestershire in the 1993 NatWest Trophy.
