= Paul Woodroffe (cricketer) =

English cricketer (born 1964)

Personal information
- Full name: Paul Joseph Woodroffe
- Born: 12 June 1964 (age 62); Hillingdon, Middlesex, England
- Batting: Right-handed
- Bowling: Right-arm medium

Domestic team information
- Years: Team
- 1994–2003: Buckinghamshire

Career statistics
Competition	List A
Matches	5
Runs scored	31
Batting average	31.00
100s/50s	–/–
Top score	16*
Balls bowled	228
Wickets	7
Bowling average	20.85
5 wickets in innings	–
10 wickets in match	–
Best bowling	2/18
Catches/stumpings	–/–
- Source: Cricinfo, 28 April 2011

Paul Joseph Woodroffe (born 12 June 1964) is a former English cricketer. Woodroffe was a right-handed batsman who bowled right-arm medium pace. He was born in Hillingdon, Middlesex.

Woodroffe made his debut for Buckinghamshire in the 1994 Minor Counties Championship against Suffolk. Woodroffe played Minor counties cricket for Buckinghamshire from 1996 to 2003, which included 28 Minor Counties Championship matches and 13 MCCA Knockout Trophy matches. In 1999, he made his List A debut against the Yorkshire Cricket Board in the NatWest Trophy. He played four further List A matches for Buckinghamshire, the last coming against Dorset in the 1st round of the 2004 Cheltenham & Gloucester Trophy which was held in 2003. In his five List A matches, he scored 31 runs at a batting average of 31.00, with a high score of 16*. With the ball he took 7 wickets at a bowling average of 20.85, with best figures of 2/18.

He also played Second XI cricket for the Middlesex Second XI from 1995–1996.
