= Robert Jones (English cricketer) =

English cricketer (born 1981)

Personal information
- Full name: Robert Alexander Jones
- Born: 11 May 1981 (age 43); Enfield, Middlesex, England
- Batting: Left-handed
- Bowling: Right-arm offbreak

Domestic team information
- Years: Team
- 2000–2003: Buckinghamshire

Robert Jones (born 11 May 1981) is an English cricketer. He was a left-handed batsman and a right-arm off-break bowler who played for Buckinghamshire. He was born in Enfield.

Jones, who played for Buckinghamshire in the Minor Counties Championship between 2000 and 2003, made a single List A appearance for the side, during the 2002 season, against Sussex. From the upper-middle order, he scored 11 runs.
