= Anatole Thomas =

English cricketer (born 1970)

Personal information
- Full name: Anatole Winston Thomas
- Born: 26 March 1970 (age 56); Hammersmith, London, England
- Batting: Right-handed
- Bowling: Right-arm fast

Domestic team information
- Years: Team
- 1996–2006: Buckinghamshire

Career statistics
Competition	List A
Matches	4
Runs scored	20
Batting average	10.00
100s/50s	–/–
Top score	9
Balls bowled	222
Wickets	5
Bowling average	38.40
5 wickets in innings	–
10 wickets in match	–
Best bowling	3/47
Catches/stumpings	–/–
- Source: Cricinfo, 28 April 2011

Anatole Winston Thomas (born 26 March 1970) is a former English cricketer. Thomas was a right-handed batsman who bowled right-arm fast. He was born in Hammersmith, London.

Thomas made his debut for Buckinghamshire in the 1993 Minor Counties Championship against Suffolk. Thomas played Minor counties cricket for Buckinghamshire from 1996 to 2006, which included 27 Minor Counties Championship matches and 8 MCCA Knockout Trophy matches. In 1998, he made his List A debut against Surrey in the NatWest Trophy. He played three further List A matches for Buckinghamshire, the last coming against Lancashire in 2005 Cheltenham & Gloucester Trophy. In his four List A matches, he scored 20 runs at a batting average of 10.00, with a high score of 9. With the ball he took 5 wickets at a bowling average of 38.40, with best figures of 3/47.

He also played Second XI cricket for the Essex Second XI, the Leicestershire Second XI and the Middlesex Second XI.
