= Laurence Champniss =

English cricketer

Personal information
- Full name: Laurence John Champniss
- Born: 20 February 1939; Harrow, Middlesex, England
- Died: 17 September 2017 (aged 78)
- Batting: Left-handed
- Bowling: Leg break googly

Domestic team information
- Years: Team
- 1973/74: Marylebone Cricket Club
- 1971–1977: Buckinghamshire

Career statistics
Competition	First-class	List A
Matches	1	2
Runs scored	17	–
Batting average	–	–
100s/50s	–/–	–/–
Top score	17*	–
Balls bowled	32	144
Wickets	1	2
Bowling average	4.00	42.50
5 wickets in innings	–	–
10 wickets in match	–	–
Best bowling	1/1	1/32
Catches/stumpings	–/–	–/–
- Source: Cricinfo, 6 May 2011

Laurence John Champniss (20 February 1939 – 17 September 2017) was a former English cricketer. Champniss was a left-handed batsman who bowled leg break googly.

== Personal life ==
Born in Harrow, Middlesex, the son of George Champniss. He was educated at a Harrow School, where he represented and captained the school cricket team. He later married Venetia Alma Mary Jolly, the daughter of Stewart Croft Jolly and Lady Sibell Alma Kathleen Le Poer Trench, on 15 July 1961. The couple had four children.

== Cricket career ==
Champniss made his debut for Buckinghamshire in the 1971 Minor Counties Championship against Norfolk. Champniss played Minor counties cricket for Buckinghamshire from 1971 to 1977, which included 43 Minor Counties Championship matches. In 1972, he made his List A debut against Glamorgan in the Gillette Cup. He was dismissed for a duck in this match by John Solanky, in what was his only List A batting innings. He took his maiden wicket in this match, that of Eifion Jones. He played his second and final List A match in the 1974 Gillette Cup against Kent. He took his second and final List A wicket in this match, that of David Nicholls. His 2 wickets came at a bowling average of 42.50.

Champniss made a single first-class appearance during his career, for the Marylebone Cricket Club against East Africa on their 1973/74 tour of East Africa. In his only first-class batting innings he scored an unbeaten 17. With the ball he took a single wicket, that of Majid Pandor.
