= Peter Stoddart =

English cricketer (1934–2019)

Personal information
- Full name: Peter Laurence Bowring Stoddart
- Born: 24 June 1934; Regent's Park, London, England
- Died: 19 April 2019 (aged 84)
- Batting: Right-handed

Domestic team information
- Years: Team
- 1958: Marylebone Cricket Club
- 1955–1967: Buckinghamshire

Career statistics
Competition	First-class	List A
Matches	1	1
Runs scored	22	0
Batting average	11.00	0.00
100s/50s	–/–	–/–
Top score	22	0
Balls bowled	–	–
Wickets	–	–
Bowling average	–	–
5 wickets in innings	–	–
10 wickets in match	–	–
Best bowling	–	–
Catches/stumpings	–/–	–/–
- Source: Cricinfo, 7 May 2011

Peter Laurence Bowring Stoddart (24 June 1934 – 19 April 2019) was an English cricketer. Stoddart was a right-handed batsman. He was born in Regent's Park, London and was educated at Sandroyd School in Wiltshire and then Eton College, where he captained the college cricket team.

Stoddart made his debut for Buckinghamshire in the 1955 Minor Counties Championship against Norfolk. Pickett played Minor counties cricket for Buckinghamshire from 1955 to 1967, which included 77 Minor Counties Championship matches. In made his only List A appearance for Buckinghamshire against Middlesex in the 1965 Gillette Cup. In this match he was run out for a duck.

Stoddart also played a single first-class match for the Marylebone Cricket Club against Ireland in 1958. In the match he scored 11 runs in the MCC first-innings, before being dismissed by Joseph Burke, and in their second-innings he was dismissed for 11 by Scott Huey.
