= Graeme Paskins =

English cricketer

Personal information
- Full name: Graeme David Terence Paskins
- Born: 1 June 1972 (age 54); Southend-on-Sea, Essex, England
- Batting: Right-handed
- Role: Occasional wicket-keeper

Domestic team information
- Years: Team
- 1993–2006: Buckinghamshire

Career statistics
| Competition | List A |
|---|---|
| Matches | 5 |
| Runs scored | 55 |
| Batting average | 11.00 |
| 100s/50s | –/– |
| Top score | 25 |
| Balls bowled | – |
| Wickets | – |
| Bowling average | – |
| 5 wickets in innings | – |
| 10 wickets in match | – |
| Best bowling | – |
| Catches/stumpings | 2/1 |
- Source: Cricinfo, 28 April 2011

Graeme David Terence Paskins (born 1 June 1972) is a former English cricketer. Paskins was a right-handed batsman who fielded occasionally as a wicket-keeper. He was born in Southend-on-Sea, Essex.

== Career ==
Paskins made his debut for Buckinghamshire in the 1993 Minor Counties Championship against Bedfordshire. Paskins played Minor counties cricket for Buckinghamshire from 1993 to 2006, which included 45 Minor Counties Championship matches and 9 MCCA Knockout Trophy matches. In 2000, he made his List A debut against Wales Minor Counties in the NatWest Trophy. He played four further List A matches for Buckinghamshire, the last coming against Lancashire in 2005 Cheltenham & Gloucester Trophy. In his five List A matches, he scored 55 runs at a batting average of 11.00, with a high score of 25. Behind the stumps he took 2 catches and made a single stumping.
