= Christopher Parry =

English cricketer (1934–2021)

Personal information
- Full name: Christopher Jackson Parry
- Born: 31 July 1934; Barnet, Hertfordshire, England
- Died: 4 March 2021 (aged 86); London, England
- Batting: Right-handed
- Bowling: Right-arm off break

Domestic team information
- Years: Team
- 1968–1977: Buckinghamshire

Career statistics
Competition	List A
Matches	4
Runs scored	10
Batting average	5.00
100s/50s	–/–
Top score	10
Balls bowled	90
Wickets	4
Bowling average	21.75
5 wickets in innings	–
10 wickets in match	–
Best bowling	3/61
Catches/stumpings	–/–
- Source: Cricinfo, 7 May 2011

Christopher Jackson Parry (31 July 1934 – 4 March 2021) was a former English cricketer. Parry was a right-handed batsman who bowled right-arm off break. He was born in Barnet, Hertfordshire.

Parry made his debut for Buckinghamshire in the 1968 Minor Counties Championship against Berkshire. Parry played Minor counties cricket for Buckinghamshire from 1968 to 1977, which included 72 Minor Counties Championship matches. In 1970, he made his List A debut against Bedfordshire in the Gillette Cup. He played 3 further List A matches for Buckinghamshire, the last coming against Glamorgan in the 1972 Gillette Cup. In his 4 List A matches, he scored 10 runs at a batting average of 5.00, with a high score of 10. With the ball he took 4 wickets at a bowling average of 21.75, with best figures of 3/61.

Parry died in London on 4 March 2021, at the age of 86.
