= Richard Humphrey (cricketer, born 1936) =

English cricketer

Personal information
- Full name: Richard Geoffrey Humphrey
- Born: 17 September 1936 (age 90); Hampstead, London, England
- Batting: Right-handed
- Role: Wicket-keeper

Domestic team information
- Years: Team
- 1980–1985: Buckinghamshire
- 1964 & 1970: Surrey

Career statistics
Competition	First-class	List A
Matches	2	2
Runs scored	63	42
Batting average	63.00	42.00
100s/50s	–/1	–/–
Top score	58	39*
Balls bowled	–	–
Wickets	–	–
Bowling average	–	–
5 wickets in innings	–	–
10 wickets in match	–	–
Best bowling	–	–
Catches/stumpings	1/–	3/–
- Source: Cricinfo, 5 May 2011

Richard Geoffrey Humphrey (born 17 December 1936) is a former English cricketer. Humphrey was right-handed batsman who fielded as a wicket-keeper. He was born in Hampstead, London.

Humphrey made his first-class debut for Surrey against Cambridge University in 1964. In this match he scored his only first-class half century, making 58 runs in the Surrey first-innings before being dismissed by Angus McLachlan. He next appeared for Surrey in 1970, playing his second and final first-class match for the county against Oxford University. In these two first-class matches he scored 63 runs at a batting average of 63.00. His average was so high due to one of his two batting innings being not out.

He later made his debut for Buckinghamshire in the 1980 Minor Counties Championship against Hertfordshire. He played Minor counties cricket for Buckinghamshire from 1980 to 1985, which included 36 Minor Counties Championship matches and 6 MCCA Knockout Trophy matches. He made his List A debut for Buckinghamshire in the 1984 NatWest Trophy against Lancashire, before making a second and final appearance the following season against Somerset in the 1985 NatWest Trophy.
