= Mark Sullivan (cricketer) =

South African cricketer (born 1964)

Mark Sullivan (born 20 October 1964) was a South African cricketer. He was a right-handed batsman and right-arm off-break bowler who played for Buckinghamshire.

== Biography ==
Sullivan was born in Sasolburg.

Sullivan, who played in the Minor Counties Championship and Minor Counties Trophy for Buckinghamshire between 1995 and 1999, made a single List A appearance for the side, during the 1998 season, against Surrey. From the tailend, he scored 14 not out.

He conceded 24 runs in two overs of bowling.

Between 2003 and 2008, Sullivan played for Beaconsfield in the Challenge Trophy and the Cockspur Cup.
