= Brian Poll =

English cricketer

Personal information
- Full name: Brian William Poll
- Born: 5 January 1941; Cheltenham, Gloucestershire, England
- Died: 18 June 1999 (aged 58); England
- Batting: Right-handed
- Role: Wicket-keeper

Domestic team information
- Years: Team
- 1972: Minor Counties South
- 1966–1980: Buckinghamshire

Career statistics
Competition	List A
Matches	10
Runs scored	73
Batting average	14.60
100s/50s	–/–
Top score	23
Balls bowled	–
Wickets	–
Bowling average	–
5 wickets in innings	–
10 wickets in match	–
Best bowling	–
Catches/stumpings	6/2
- Source: Cricinfo, 7 May 2011

Brian William Poll (5 January 1941 – 18 June 1999) was an English cricketer. Poll was a right-handed batsman who fielded as a wicket-keeper. He was born in Cheltenham, Gloucestershire.

Poll made his debut for Buckinghamshire in the 1966 Minor Counties Championship against Hertfordshire. Poll played Minor counties cricket for Buckinghamshire from 1966 to 1980, which included 131 Minor Counties Championship matches. In 1969, he made his List A debut against Middlesex in the Gillette Cup. He played 7 further List A matches for Buckinghamshire, the last coming against Suffolk in the 1979 Gillette Cup. He also played 2 List A matches for Minor Counties South in the 1972 Benson & Hedges Cup against Somerset and Glamorgan. In his total of 10 List A matches, he scored 73 runs at a batting average of 14.60, with a high score of 23. Behind the stumps he took 6 catches and made 2 stumpings.

He died on 18 June 1999.
