= Greg Hames =

English cricketer (born 1980)

Greg Hames (born 3 May 1980) is a retired English cricketer. He was a right-handed batsman and a right-arm medium-pace bowler who played for Buckinghamshire. He was born in Reading.

Hames, who played for Buckinghamshire in the Minor Counties Championship between 1998 and 2000, made a single List A appearance for the side, during the 1999 season, against Yorkshire Cricket Board. From the opening order, he scored 16 runs.
