= John Slack (cricketer) =

English cricketer and judge (1930–2012)

Personal information
- Full name: John Kenneth Edward Slack
- Born: 23 December 1930; Marylebone, London, England
- Died: 6 May 2012 (aged 81); Cuddington, Buckinghamshire, England
- Nickname: CJ
- Batting: Right-handed
- Bowling: Right-arm off break

Domestic team information
- Years: Team
- 1954: Cambridge University
- 1964–1969: Buckinghamshire

Career statistics
Competition	First-class	List A
Matches	7	1
Runs scored	434	6
Batting average	31.00	6.00
100s/50s	1/2	0/0
Top score	135	6
Catches/stumpings	4/–	1/–
- Source: Cricinfo, 7 May 2011

John Kenneth Edward Slack DL (23 December 1930 – 6 May 2012) was an English cricketer and judge. He was born at Marylebone, London.

A right-handed batsman, Slack made his first-class debut for Cambridge University against Middlesex in 1954. He played 6 further first-class matches for the university in that year, the last coming against Oxford University. In his 7 first-class matches, he scored 434 runs at a batting average of 31.00, with two half centuries and a single century high score of 135. This came on debut against Middlesex.

Slack later joined Buckinghamshire, making his debut for the county in the 1964 Minor Counties Championship against Suffolk. Slack played Minor counties cricket for Buckinghamshire from 1964 to 1969. He captained them from 1967 to 1969, leading them to the championship in his final year. He made his only List A appearance for Buckinghamshire against Middlesex in the 1969 Gillette Cup, captaining the team. He scored 8 runs before being dismissed by Fred Titmus.

Slack also played rugby union for Middlesex.

Slack worked for nearly 20 years as a solicitor in London. He was appointed as a circuit judge in 1974, a position he held for the next 26 years, during which he presided over Aylesbury Crown Court for many years. He was appointed a Deputy Lieutenant for Buckinghamshire on 10 November 1995.

He died aged 81 at Cuddington, Buckinghamshire, on 6 May 2012, two days after suffering a stroke. He and his wife Patricia had two sons.
