= Malcolm Roberts (cricketer) =

English cricketer

Personal information
- Full name: Malcolm John Roberts
- Born: 18 February 1960 (age 66); Bromley, Kent, England
- Batting: Right-handed
- Bowling: Right-arm medium

Domestic team information
- Years: Team
- 1990–1995: Minor Counties
- 1987–1997: Buckinghamshire

Career statistics
Competition	First-class	List A
Matches	1	21
Runs scored	86	545
Batting average	43.00	27.25
100s/50s	–/1	1/2
Top score	85	–
Balls bowled	–	–
Wickets	–	–
Bowling average	–	–
5 wickets in innings	–	–
10 wickets in match	–	–
Best bowling	–	–
Catches/stumpings	–/–	6/–
- Source: Cricinfo, 4 May 2011

Malcolm John Roberts (born 18 February 1960) is a former English cricketer. Roberts was a right-handed batsman who bowled right-arm medium pace. He was born in Bromley, Kent.

== Buckinghamshire ==
Roberts made his debut for Buckinghamshire in the 1987 Minor Counties Championship against Shropshire. He played Minor counties cricket for Buckinghamshire from 1987 to 1997, which included 76 Minor Counties Championship matches and 19 MCCA Knockout Trophy matches. In 1988, he made his List A debut for Buckinghamshire against Kent in the NatWest Trophy. He played three further List A matches for Buckinghamshire, the last coming against Leicestershire in the 1993 NatWest Trophy. In his four List A matches, he scored 94 runs at a batting average of 31.33, with a single half century high score of 54.

== Minor Counties ==
His appearances for Buckinghamshire entitled him to play for the Minor Counties cricket team. He made his debut for the team in the 1990 Benson & Hedges Cup against Middlesex. He played 16 further List A matches for the team, with his final appearance coming against Nottinghamshire in the 1995 Benson & Hedges Cup. He scored 451 runs at an average of 26.52, with a single century high score of 121, which came against Sussex in 1990.

During his career, Roberts made a single first-class appearance for the Minor Counties against the touring Indians in 1990 at Trowbridge Cricket Ground. In this match he scored 85 runs in a stand of 178 with Gary Brown, before he was dismissed by Ravi Shastri. In the Minor Counties second-innings scored a single run before being dismissed by Sanjeev Sharma.
