= Jason Harrison =

English cricketer (born 1972)

Personal information
- Full name: Jason Christian Harrison
- Born: 15 January 1972 (age 54); Amersham, Buckinghamshire, England
- Batting: Right-handed
- Bowling: Right-arm off break

Domestic team information
- Years: Team
- 2003–2014: Buckinghamshire
- 1999–2002: Lincolnshire
- 1992–1997: Middlesex
- 1991–1998: Buckinghamshire

Career statistics
Competition	First-class	List A
Matches	10	15
Runs scored	298	239
Batting average	19.86	19.91
100s/50s	–/–	–/1
Top score	46*	71
Balls bowled	–	258
Wickets	–	3
Bowling average	–	67.66
5 wickets in innings	–	–
10 wickets in match	–	–
Best bowling	–	1/3
Catches/stumpings	12/–	6/–
- Source: Cricinfo, 8 May 2011

Jason Christian Harrison (born 15 January 1972) is an English former cricketer. Harrison was a right-handed batsman who bowled right-arm off break. He was born in Amersham, Buckinghamshire.

Having made his debut in county cricket for Buckinghamshire, who he played for in both the Minor Counties Championship and the MCCA Knockout Trophy, Harrison made his first-class debut for Middlesex in a first-class match against Cambridge University in 1994. He played 9 further first-class matches for Middlesex, the last coming against Warwickshire in the 1996 County Championship. In his 10 first-class matches for Middlesex, he scored 298 runs at a batting average of 19.86, with a high score of 46*. It was for Middlesex that he made his List A debut for, against Leicestershire in the 1994 AXA Equity & Law League. He played 4 further List A matches for Middlesex, up to 1996.

After being released by Middlesex, Harrison played a further two seasons for Buckinghamshire, in which time he made his List A debut for the county against Surrey in the 1998 NatWest Trophy. The season following that he joined Lincolnshire for the 1999 season. He played Minor counties cricket for Lincolnshire from 1999 to 2002. Harrison also appeared in the List A cricket for Lincolnshire, making 8 appearances in that format for the county, the last coming against Glamorgan in the 2002 Cheltenham & Gloucester Trophy. In his 8 appearances for the county, he scored 164 runs at an average of 20.50, with a single half century high score of 71. This came against Suffolk in the 2001 Cheltenham & Gloucester Trophy.

Upon his return to his native county in 2003, he also played a final List A match, against Lancashire in the 2005 Cheltenham & Gloucester Trophy. In his career he played a total of 15 List A matches, scoring 239 runs at an average of 19.91, with a high score of 71. With the ball he took 3 wickets at a bowling average of 67.66, with best figures of 1/3.

After his playing career, Harrison was appointed Director of Cricket for Buckinghamshire CCC in 2015. Merging with the Cricket Board in 2023, to become Bucks Cricket, Harrison became their first Head of Performance, leading the county to win the National Counties Championship in 2023 & 2025.
