= Maxine Blythin =

English cricketer (born 1994)

Personal information
- Full name: Maxine Blythin
- Born: 25 August 1994 (age 32)
- Batting: Right-handed
- Role: Batter

Domestic team information
- Years: Team
- 2019–2021: Kent
- 2020: South East Stars
- 2023–present: Wiltshire

Career statistics
Competition	WLA	WT20
Matches	9	9
Runs scored	221	252
Batting average	31.57	31.50
100s/50s	0/2	0/1
Top score	51*	72*
Catches/stumpings	8/–	2/–
- Source: CricketArchive, 23 October 2023

Maxine Blythin (born 25 August 1994) is an English cricketer who currently plays for Wiltshire. She plays as a right-handed batter. She has previously played for Kent and South East Stars.

== Early life ==
Blythin was born on 25 August 1994 and grew up near Canterbury. Blythin is transgender, and transitioned to female in her teenage years.

== Domestic career ==
Blythin made her county debut in 2019, for Kent against Nottinghamshire in a County Championship match, in which she scored 43. Blythin went on to be Kent's third-highest Championship run-scorer that season, scoring 165 runs at an average of 33.00, including her maiden county half-century, scoring 51* against Hampshire. Blythin then went on to be Kent's leading run-scorer in the 2019 Women's Twenty20 Cup, with 175 runs at an average of 29.16. Blythin was subsequently named the Kent Women Club Player of the Year for 2019. In 2021, she only played in the Women's London Championship, scoring 135 runs including 94 made against Sussex. In 2023, she moved to Wiltshire, playing three matches for the side in the 2023 Women's Twenty20 Cup, including scoring 72* on debut against Dorset.

In 2020, Blythin played for South East Stars in the Rachael Heyhoe Flint Trophy. She appeared in two matches, scoring 56 runs with a top score of 50 against Western Storm.
