= Adnan Saleem =

English cricketer

Personal information
- Full name: Adnan Saleem
- Born: 18 December 1976 (age 49); Islamabad, Pakistan
- Batting: Left-handed
- Bowling: Left-arm fast

Domestic team information
- Years: Team
- 2002–2006: Buckinghamshire

Career statistics
Competition	List A
Matches	5
Runs scored	2
Batting average	1.00
100s/50s	–/–
Top score	2
Balls bowled	179
Wickets	5
Bowling average	32.20
5 wickets in innings	–
10 wickets in match	–
Best bowling	3/24
Catches/stumpings	1/–
- Source: Cricinfo, 27 April 2011

Adnan Saleem (born 18 December 1976) is an English cricketer. Saleem is a left-handed batsman who bowled left-arm Fast. He was born in Islamabad.

Saleem made his debut for Buckinghamshire in the 2002 MCCA Knockout Trophy against the Northamptonshire Cricket Board. Saleem played Minor counties cricket for Buckinghamshire from 2002 to 2006, which included nine Minor Counties Championship matches and six MCCA Knockout Trophy matches. In 2002, he made his List A debut against Sussex in the Cheltenham & Gloucester Trophy. He played four further List A matches for Buckinghamshire, the last coming against Lancashire in 2005. In his five List A matches, he took 5 wickets at a bowling average of 32.20, with best figures of 3/24.

From 1996 to 1998, Saleem played mainly Second XI cricket for the Surrey County Cricket Club and was a consistent performer with over 75 wickets and an ability to strike at any time. Due to the strength of the Surrey squad, he found limited opportunity in the Surrey First XI. He has represented numerous sides over the years including English Schools, British Universities, Club Cricket Conference, and Marylebone Cricket Club with distinction. In 2000 he was named the player of the tournament in the Home Nations Competition in Dublin representing English Universities. A Civil Engineer by profession Saleem made his debut in the Surrey Championship in 1993 for Addiscombe Cricket Club and has around 600 first team wickets and over 5000 first team runs making him one of the leading club cricketers in the Surrey Championship. Adnan has toured with the Club Cricket Conference to Australia and Hong Kong and also represented Marylebone Cricket Club on tours to USA, Greece, Italy, Scotland, and Ireland also playing A Grade Cricket for Sir Donald Bradman's old club Kennsington District Cricket Club in Adelaide.
