= Gary Black (cricketer) =

English cricketer (born 1954)

Personal information
- Full name: Gary Raymond Black
- Born: 11 May 1954 (age 72); Hammersmith, London, England
- Batting: Right-handed
- Bowling: Right-arm medium

Domestic team information
- Years: Team
- 1984–1993: Buckinghamshire

Career statistics
Competition	List A
Matches	8
Runs scored	36
Batting average	5.14
100s/50s	–/–
Top score	14
Balls bowled	423
Wickets	10
Bowling average	32.80
5 wickets in innings	–
10 wickets in match	–
Best bowling	3/83
Catches/stumpings	4/–
- Source: Cricinfo, 4 May 2011

Gary Raymond Black (born 11 May 1954) is a former English cricketer. Black was a right-handed batsman who bowled right-arm medium. He was born in Hammersmith, London.

Black made his debut for Buckinghamshire in the 1984 Minor Counties Championship against Berkshire. Black played Minor counties cricket for Buckinghamshire from 1984 to 1993, which included 67 Minor Counties Championship matches and 12 MCCA Knockout Trophy matches. In 1985, he made his List A debut against Somerset in the NatWest Trophy. He played 7 further List A matches for Buckinghamshire, the last coming against Leicestershire in the 1993 NatWest Trophy. In his 8 List A matches, he took 10 wickets at a bowling average of 32.80, with best figures of 3/83.

He also played Second XI cricket for the Northamptonshire Second XI in 1977.
