= Jeremy Batty =

English cricketer (born 1971)

Personal information
- Full name: Jeremy David Batty
- Born: 15 May 1971 (age 55); Bradford, Yorkshire, England
- Batting: Right-handed
- Bowling: Right-arm off break

Domestic team information
- Years: Team
- 1989–1994: Yorkshire
- 1995–1996: Somerset
- 2000–2003: Buckinghamshire
- First-class debut: 8 September 1989 Yorkshire v Lancashire
- Last First-class: 3 September 1996 Somerset v Derbyshire
- List A debut: 2 May 1991 Yorkshire v Minor Counties
- Last List A: 7 May 2003 Buckinghamshire v Gloucestershire

Career statistics
| Competition | First-class | List A |
|---|---|---|
| Matches | 84 | 55 |
| Runs scored | 1,149 | 266 |
| Batting average | 15.95 | 14.77 |
| 100s/50s | 0/2 | 0/0 |
| Top score | 51 | 36* |
| Balls bowled | 13,645 | 2,418 |
| Wickets | 179 | 54 |
| Bowling average | 41.56 | 32.90 |
| 5 wickets in innings | 4 | 0 |
| 10 wickets in match | 0 | 0 |
| Best bowling | 6/48 | 4/33 |
| Catches/stumpings | 32/0 | 21/0 |
- Source: ESPNcricinfo, 17 November 2013

Jeremy David Batty (born 15 May 1971) is an English former professional cricketer, who played for Yorkshire and Somerset as a right-handed batsman, and off spin bowler.

Batty made his Yorkshire debut in 1989, leaving the county in 1994 to play for Somerset until 1996. In 84 first-class matches he scored 1,149 runs at 15.95 with two fifties, and took 179 wickets at 41.56, with a career-best of 6 for 48. He appeared for Buckinghamshire in 2003 and 2004.

His brother, Gareth Batty, has also played first-class cricket and appeared for England.

Jeremy Batty resides in Oxfordshire with wife Sabina and their son.
