= Hannah Jones (Surrey cricketer) =

English cricketer

Personal information
- Full name: Hannah Violet Jones
- Born: 21 July 1999 (age 27); Surrey, England
- Batting: Right-handed
- Bowling: Right-arm off break
- Role: All-rounder

Domestic team information
- Years: Team
- 2012–2021: Surrey
- 2017–2019: Surrey Stars
- 2020–2021: South East Stars

Career statistics
Competition	WLA	WT20
Matches	54	59
Runs scored	621	527
Batting average	13.80	14.24
100s/50s	0/0	0/1
Top score	39*	50
Balls bowled	1,718	843
Wickets	54	45
Bowling average	22.09	18.48
5 wickets in innings	0	0
10 wickets in match	0	0
Best bowling	4/31	3/8
Catches/stumpings	26/–	7/–
- Source: CricketArchive, 18 March 2022

Hannah Violet Jones (born 21 July 1999) is an English cricketer who plays as an all-rounder, bowling right-arm off break and batting right-handed. She has played for Surrey, Surrey Stars and South East Stars. In 2022, it was announced that Jones was taking a break from cricket for the upcoming season, but was not formally retiring.

== Early life ==
Jones was born on 21 July 1999 in Surrey. She is also a qualified cricket coach. She works as a personal trainer.

== Domestic career ==
Jones made her county debut in 2012, for Surrey against Sussex. She hit her maiden county half-century a season later, scoring 50 against Hertfordshire. She was Surrey's second-highest wicket-taker in the 2016 Women's County Championship, with 13 wickets including two four-wicket hauls. She became captain of Surrey during the 2018 season, and captained them to their first London Cup victory over Middlesex in 2020. She played six matches for the side in the 2021 Women's Twenty20 Cup, taking six wickets at an average of 17.33.

Jones also played for Surrey Stars in the Women's Cricket Super League between 2017 and 2019. She played eight matches across the three seasons, including the semi-final in 2017. She only bowled in one match, however, taking 2/24 from two overs against Lancashire Thunder in 2019.

In 2020, Jones played for South East Stars in the Rachael Heyhoe Flint Trophy. She appeared in all six matches, scoring 74 runs and taking 7 wickets at an average of 33.14. In 2021, Jones was named in the squads for South East Stars and London Spirit, but did not play due to injury.

In March 2022, it was announced that Jones was stepping away from cricket for the upcoming season in order to focus on her career as a personal trainer, although she was not formally retiring.
