= Ironmould Lane, Bristol =

Cricket ground in Bristol, England

Coordinates: 51.42835°N 2.52480°W

Ironmould Lane
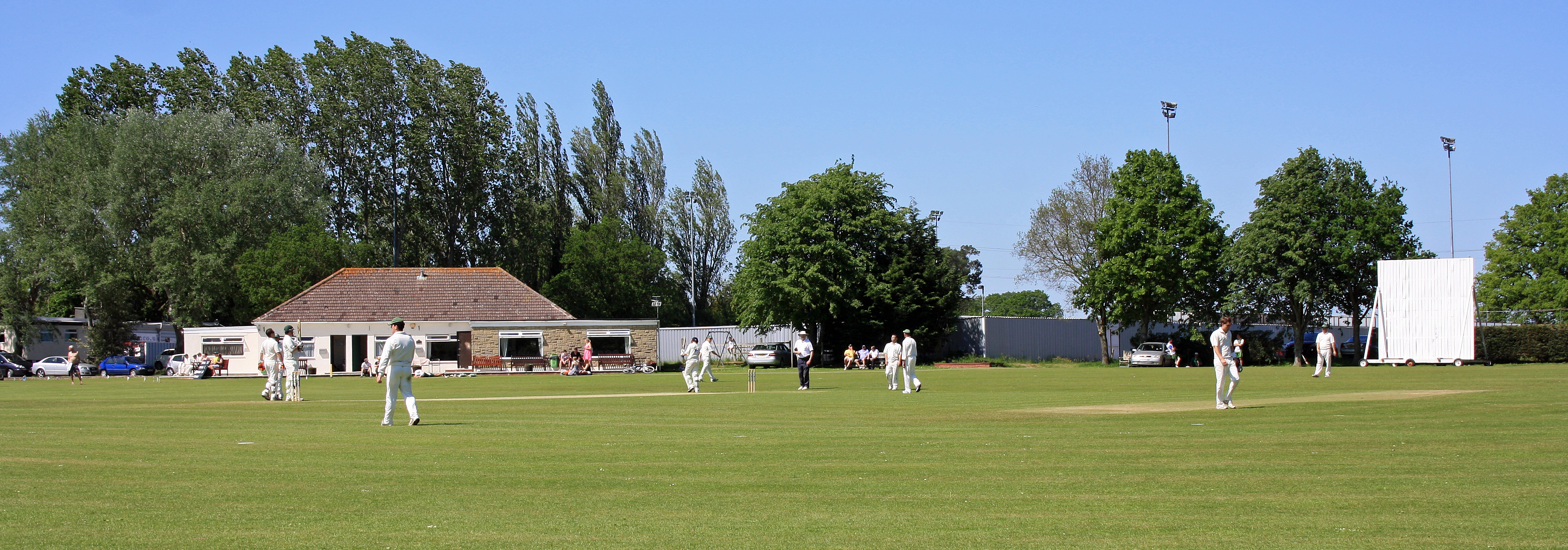

Ground information
- Location: Bristol
- Establishment: 1894 (first recorded match)

Team information
Somerset	(1969-1970)
- As of 30 August 2010; Source: Ground profile

Ironmould Lane is a cricket ground in Bristol. The first recorded match on the ground was in 1894, when Brislington played Peasedown St John. In 1969 the ground held its first List-A match when Somerset played Surrey in the Player's County League. The following season the ground held its final List-A match when Somerset played Derbyshire in the John Player League.

Still in use to this day, the ground is the home venue of Brislington Cricket Club.
