= Tim Scriven =

English cricketer

Personal information
- Full name: Timothy John Adam Scriven
- Born: 15 December 1965 (age 60); High Wycombe, Buckinghamshire, England
- Batting: Right-handed
- Bowling: Slow left-arm orthodox

Domestic team information
- Years: Team
- 1988–1989: Somerset
- 1988–1999: Buckinghamshire
- 1994: Minor Counties

Career statistics
Competition	First-class	List A
Matches	4	9
Runs scored	19	57
Batting average	6.33	8.14
100s/50s	–/–	–/–
Top score	8	33
Balls bowled	901	540
Wickets	10	9
Bowling average	44.60	43.55
5 wickets in innings	–	–
10 wickets in match	–	–
Best bowling	3/43	3/61
Catches/stumpings	–/–	2/–
- Source: Cricinfo, 20 January 2012

Timothy John Adam Scriven (born 15 December 1965) played first-class cricket for Somerset in 1988 and 1989. Primarily a Minor Counties cricketer for Buckinghamshire, he played for Buckinghamshire between 1988 and 1999, in which he was very successful. Scriven also appeared in a first-class match for a Minor Counties cricket team in 1994. He was born at High Wycombe, Buckinghamshire.

A tall left-arm orthodox spin bowler and right-handed middle order batsman, Scriven had played for Northamptonshire and Minor Counties cricket for Buckinghamshire before arriving at Somerset in 1988. In two seasons, he was given three first eleven matches and took two wickets in an innings. Five years after leaving Somerset, he played a first-class match for the Minor Counties team against the 1994 South Africans and took three wickets for 43 runs in the tourists' first innings, the best figures of his first-class career. In nine List A matches for Buckinghamshire in the NatWest Trophy between 1988 and 1999, his best bowling was three for 61 in 12 overs in the match against Surrey in 1998. His best batting was in his final List A match, against Warwickshire in 1999, he scored 33.
