= Simon Stanway =

English cricketer

Personal information
- Full name: Simon Francis Stanway
- Born: 22 April 1966 (age 60); Aylesbury, Buckinghamshire, England
- Batting: Right-handed
- Bowling: Right-arm medium

Domestic team information
- Years: Team
- 1989–2015: Buckinghamshire

Career statistics
Competition	List A
Matches	12
Runs scored	6
Batting average	–
100s/50s	0/0
Top score	2*
Balls bowled	582
Wickets	9
Bowling average	37.11
5 wickets in innings	0
10 wickets in match	0
Best bowling	2/30
Catches/stumpings	4/–
- Source: Cricinfo, 2 May 2011

Simon Francis Stanway (born 22 April 1966) is an English cricketer. Stanway is a right-handed batsman who bowls right-arm medium pace. He was born in Aylesbury, Buckinghamshire.

Stanway made his debut for Buckinghamshire in the 1989 Minor Counties Championship against Wales Minor Counties. Stanway has played Minor counties cricket for Buckinghamshire from 1989 to 2015, which includes 132 Minor Counties Championship matches and 53 MCCA Knockout Trophy matches. In 1997, he made his List A debut against Essex in the NatWest Trophy. He played 11 further List A matches for Buckinghamshire, the last coming against Lancashire in the 2005 Cheltenham & Gloucester Trophy. In his 12 List A matches, he took 9 wickets at a bowling average of 37.11, with best figures of 2/30.

Since 2006, he has played for Tring Park in the Home Counties Premier League, playing a total of 219 matches as of August 2019.
