= Dinton Cricket Club Ground =

Cricket ground in Dinton, Buckinghamshire

Coordinates: 51.79295°N 0.89546°W

Oxford Road Cricket Ground, Dinton Cricket Club
Ground information
- Location: Dinton, Buckinghamshire
- Establishment: 2001 (first recorded match)

Team information
Buckinghamshire	(2001-2002)
- As of 22 August 2010; Source: Ground profile

Oxford Road Cricket Ground is the home of Dinton CC and a cricket ground in Dinton, Buckinghamshire.

Although the site has existed as Dinton CC'S ground since the 19th century, the first recorded county fixture here was in 2001, when Buckinghamshire played the Worcestershire Cricket Board in a List-A match in the 1st round of the 2002 Cheltenham & Gloucester Trophy. The following year the ground held its second List-A match when Buckinghamshire played Suffolk in the 1st round of the 2003 Cheltenham & Gloucester Trophy.

Dinton Cricket Club play in the Home Counties Premier Cricket League.
