= Daniel Drepaul =

English cricketer

Personal information
- Full name: Daniel Raymond Drepaul
- Born: 5 September 1975 (age 51); Lambeth, London, England
- Batting: Right-handed
- Bowling: Right-arm off break
- Role: Wicket-keeper

Domestic team information
- Years: Team
- 2001–2002: Buckinghamshire

Career statistics
Competition	List A
Matches	5
Runs scored	87
Batting average	29.00
100s/50s	–/–
Top score	47*
Balls bowled	–
Wickets	–
Bowling average	–
5 wickets in innings	–
10 wickets in match	–
Best bowling	–
Catches/stumpings	1/4
- Source: Cricinfo, 27 April 2011

Daniel Raymond Drepaul (born 5 September 1975) is a former English cricketer. Drepaul was a right-handed batsman who bowled right-arm off break and who fielded as a wicket-keeper. He was born in Lambeth, London.

Drepaul made his debut for Buckinghamshire in Minor counties cricket in the 2001 MCCA Knockout Trophy against the Kent Cricket Board. Drepaul played Minor counties cricket for Buckinghamshire from 2001 to 2002, which included ten Minor Counties Championship matches and six MCCA Knockout Trophy matches. In 2001, he made his List A debut, in what was his debut match for Buckinghamshire, against the Kent Cricket Board in the Cheltenham & Gloucester Trophy. He played four further List A matches for Buckinghamshire, the last coming against Shropshire in the 2nd round of the 2003 Cheltenham & Gloucester Trophy which was held in 2002. In his five List A matches, he scored 87 runs at a batting average of 29.00, with a high score of 47*. Behind the stumps he took a single catch and made 4 stumpings. His highest score came against the Kent Cricket Board on debut.

From 1996 to 1997, he played Second XI cricket for the Surrey Second XI in 1995 and the Essex Second XI in 2000.
