= Timothy Peter Russell =

English cricketer

Personal information
- Full name: Timothy Philip Russell
- Born: 27 February 1958 (age 68); High Wycombe, Buckinghamshire, England
- Batting: Right-handed
- Role: Wicket-keeper

Domestic team information
- Years: Team
- 1981–2000: Buckinghamshire

Career statistics
Competition	List A
Matches	3
Runs scored	36
Batting average	12.00
100s/50s	–/–
Top score	23
Balls bowled	–
Wickets	–
Bowling average	–
5 wickets in innings	–
10 wickets in match	–
Best bowling	–
Catches/stumpings	1/–
- Source: Cricinfo, 4 May 2011

Timothy Philip Russell (born 27 February 1958) is a former English cricketer. Russell was a right-handed batsman who fielded as a wicket-keeper. He was born in High Wycombe, Buckinghamshire.

Russell made his debut for Buckinghamshire in the 1981 Minor Counties Championship against Norfolk. Russell played Minor counties cricket for Buckinghamshire from 1981 to 2000, which included 61 Minor Counties Championship matches and 9 MCCA Knockout Trophy matches. In 1985, he made his List A debut against Somerset in the NatWest Trophy. He played two further List A matches for Buckinghamshire, against Sussex in the 1992 NatWest Trophy and Leicestershire in the 1993 NatWest Trophy. In his 3 List A matches, he scored 36 runs at a batting average of 12.00, with a high score of 23.

He also played Second XI cricket for the Middlesex Second XI in 1976.
