= Richard Hurd (cricketer) =

English cricketer

Personal information
- Full name: Richard Brian Hurd
- Born: 18 December 1970 (age 55); Amersham, Buckinghamshire, England
- Batting: Right-handed

Domestic team information
- Years: Team
- 1992–1998: Buckinghamshire

Career statistics
Competition	List A
Matches	2
Runs scored	33
Batting average	16.50
100s/50s	0/0
Top score	18
Catches/stumpings	1/–
- Source: Cricinfo, 3 May 2011

Richard Brian Hurd (born 18 December 1970) is a former English cricketer. Hurd was a right-handed batsman. He was born in Amersham, Buckinghamshire.

Hurd made his debut for Buckinghamshire in the 1992 Minor Counties Championship against Cambridgeshire. Hurd played Minor counties cricket for Buckinghamshire from 1992 to 1998, which included 16 Minor Counties Championship matches and 4 MCCA Knockout Trophy matches. He made two List A appearances for Buckinghamshire, against Essex in the 1997 NatWest Trophy and Surrey in the 1998 NatWest Trophy. In these two List A matches, he took scored 33 runs at a batting average of 16.50, with a high score of 18.
