= Paul Sawyer (cricketer) =

English cricketer (born 1979)

Personal information
- Full name: Paul Richard Sawyer
- Born: 26 September 1979 (age 47); High Wycombe, Buckinghamshire, England
- Batting: Left-handed
- Bowling: Leg break

Domestic team information
- Years: Team
- 1997–present: Buckinghamshire

Career statistics
Competition	List A
Matches	10
Runs scored	196
Batting average	24.50
100s/50s	–/1
Top score	50
Balls bowled	42
Wickets	3
Bowling average	19.33
5 wickets in innings	–
10 wickets in match	–
Best bowling	2/55
Catches/stumpings	6/–
- Source: Cricinfo, 2 May 2011

Paul Richard Sawyer (born 26 December 1979) is an English cricketer. Sawyer is a left-handed batsman who bowls leg break. He was born in High Wycombe, Buckinghamshire.

Sawyer made his debut for Buckinghamshire in the 1997 Minor Counties Championship against Staffordshire. Stanway has played Minor counties cricket for Buckinghamshire from 1997 to present, which includes 52 Minor Counties Championship matches and 22 MCCA Knockout Trophy matches. In 1997, he made his List A debut against Essex in the NatWest Trophy. He played 10 further List A matches for Buckinghamshire, the last coming against Lancashire in the 2005 Cheltenham & Gloucester Trophy. In his 10 List A matches, he took scored 196 runs at a batting average of 24.50, with a single half century high score which came against Suffolk in the 2003 Cheltenham & Gloucester Trophy. With the ball he took 3 wickets at a bowling average of 19.33, with best figures of 2/55.

He has also played Second XI cricket for the Middlesex Second XI, the Worcestershire Second XI and the Northamptonshire Second XI.
