= Buckinghamshire County Cricket Club =

English Cricket Club

Personnel
- Captain: Conner Haddow
- Coach: Jason Harrison
- Chairman: Ian Hodgson

Team information
- Founded: 1891
- Home ground: Various

History
- National/Minor Counties Championship wins: 11 + 1 Shared
- NCCA Knockout Trophy wins: 1
- Official website: Bucks CCC

Buckinghamshire County Cricket Club is one of twenty National County clubs within the domestic cricket structure of England and Wales. It represents the historic county of Buckinghamshire.

The team is currently a member of the National Counties Championship Eastern Division and plays in the NCCA Knockout Trophy. Buckinghamshire played List A matches occasionally from 1965 until 2005 but is not classified as a List A team per se.

The club plays its matches around the county at various locations including at Wormsley on the Getty Estate. Until 1979 it played regularly at Ascott Park, the home of the Rothschild family which was prominent in the club's foundation.

== Honours ==
- National/Minor Counties Championship (11) - 1922, 1923, 1925, 1932, 1938, 1952, 1969, 1987, 2009, 2023, 2025; shared (1) - 1899
- NCCA Knockout Trophy (1) - 1990

== Earliest cricket ==
A match in October 1730 on Datchet Heath (now known as Datchet Common), outside the village of Datchet near Windsor, is the first reference to cricket in Buckinghamshire. Datchet is nowadays in Berkshire but was historically part of Buckinghamshire.

In September 1740, a team called "Buckinghamshire, Berkshire & Hertfordshire" played two matches against the famous London Cricket Club at Uxbridge and the Artillery Ground. London won the first "with great difficulty" but no post-match report was found of the second.

In 1759, an All-England team that played three matches against the noted Dartford Cricket Club included a wicketkeeper called Gill from Buckinghamshire. The same player almost certainly featured in another All-England team in 1772.

A number of games involving Buckinghamshire teams are mentioned in newspapers of the late 18th century. Unlike neighbouring Berkshire, Buckinghamshire was never considered an important county team.

== Origin of club ==
The present Buckinghamshire CCC was founded on 15 January 1891 as "Bucks County Cricket Club" with the Rothschild family prominent in its formation. Family member Anthony Gustav de Rothschild even represented the club.

== Club history ==
Buckinghamshire joined the Minor Counties Championship in the competition's second season, 1896. Buckinghamshire declined an invitation to join the first-class County Championship in 1921 because of the lack of first-class facilities in the county. Buckinghamshire has won the Championship outright 11 times (1922, 1923, 1925, 1932, 1938, 1952, 1969, 1987, 2009, 2023 and 2025) and shared the title in 1899 with Northamptonshire. In 2006, they won the Eastern Division, but lost in the final to Devon. Buckinghamshire has won the MCCA Knockout Trophy once since its inception in 1983, in 1990, defeating Lincolnshire in the final at Lord's The most successful period for the county came under the captaincy of Walter Franklin, who led them to five Championships in the 1920s and 1930s.

The county first played List A cricket in the 1965 Gillette Cup against Middlesex. The county appeared in 32 List A matches from 1965 to 2005, winning eight and losing 24, the majority of which against first-class opponents. The county claimed a first-class scalp once, defeating Somerset in the 1987 NatWest Trophy. Buckinghamshire lost the right to play List A cricket when the Minor counties were excluded from the Cheltenham & Gloucester Trophy from the 2006 season onward.

== Notable players ==
See List of Buckinghamshire CCC List A players and Category:Buckinghamshire cricketers

The following Buckinghamshire cricketers also made an impact on the first-class game:

- Ben Barnett
- Hartley Alleyne
- Wilf Slack
- Phil Newport
- Keith Medlycott
- Alex Hales
- Alexei Kervezee

== 1st XI Grounds ==
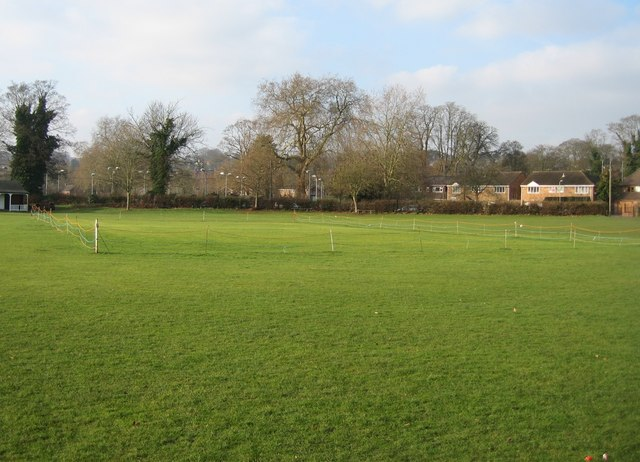
Pound Lane, used by Buckinghamshire in the 2011 season

The club have no fixed home, but play their matches at various grounds across the county.

- Gerrards Cross Cricket Club Ground, Gerrards Cross
- London Road, High Wycombe
- Tring Park Cricket Club Ground, Tring (in neighbouring Hertfordshire)

== See also ==
- List of Buckinghamshire CCC List A records
