= County cricket =

Cricket matches between the historic counties of England and Wales

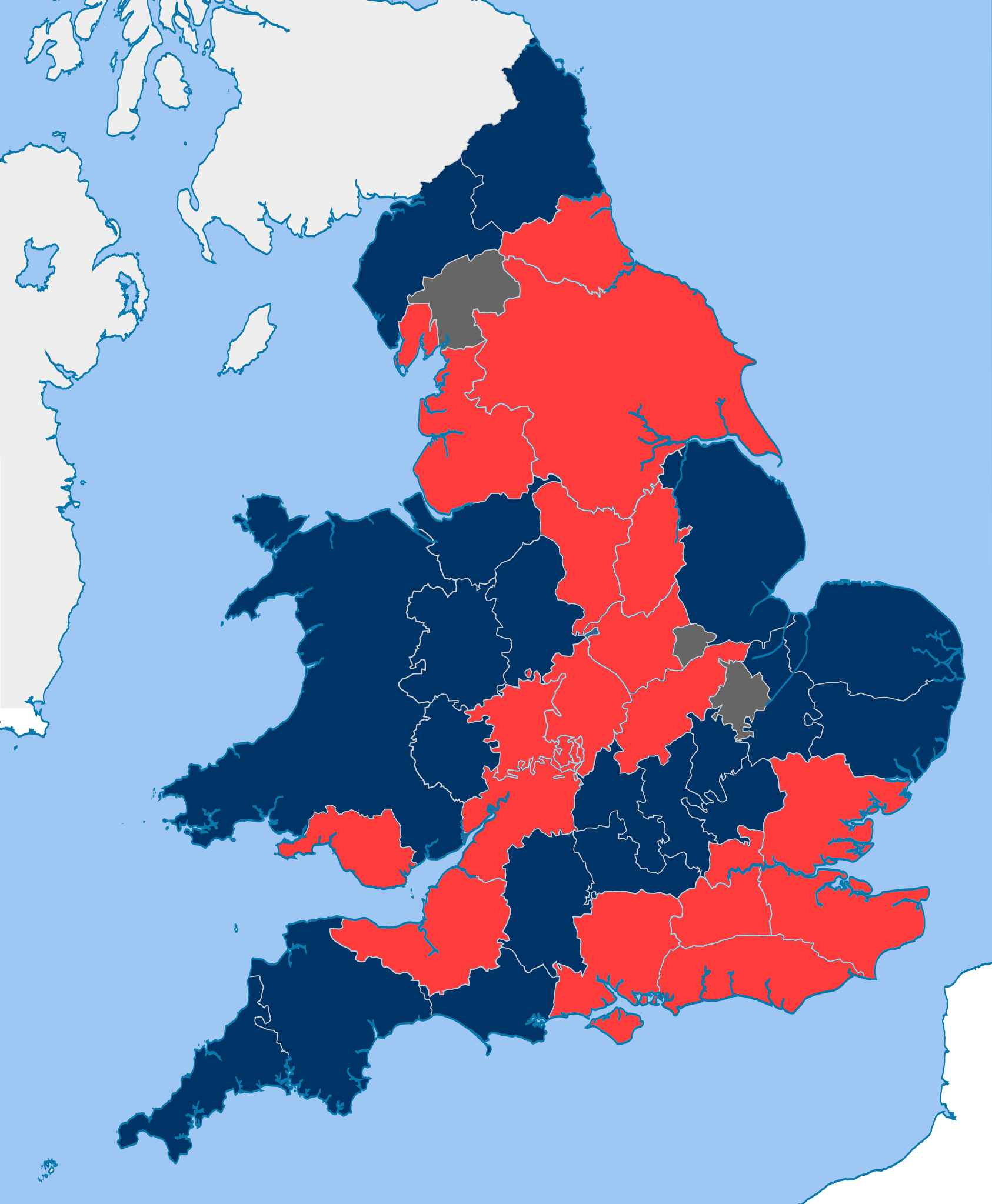
County cricket clubs in England and Wales: First-class counties National Counties (formerly known as Minor Counties) Other counties

In cricket, the umbrella term county cricket is applied to all matches between teams that are representative of an English or Welsh county. The earliest inter-county matches were played in the first half of the 18th century.

Two county championship competitions have existed since the late 19th century at different levels: the County Championship, a first-class competition which involves 18 clubs, of which 17 are English and one is from Wales; and the National Counties Championship (formerly the Minor Counties Championship), with 19 English clubs and one club representing several Welsh counties.

County clubs have also played limited-overs competitions since the 1960s. The first edition of the Gillette Cup in 1963 was the world's first List A cricket tournament. The Sunday League existed from 1969 to 2009, mostly as a 40-overs-per-side league. The 2003 Twenty20 Cup was the world's first Twenty20 tournament. Currently, the main limited-overs county competitions are the One-Day Cup, Women's One-Day Cup, T20 Blast, and Women's T20 Blast.

== History ==
County cricket started in the 18th century; the earliest known inter-county match was played in 1709, though an official County Championship was not instituted until 1890.

=== Development of county cricket ===
Inter-county cricket was popular throughout the 18th century, although the best teams, such as Kent in the 1740s and Hampshire in the days of the famous Hambledon Club, were usually acknowledged as such by being matched against England. The most successful county teams were Hampshire, Kent, Middlesex, Surrey and Sussex. There was, however, often a crossover between town and county, with some strong local clubs tending at times to represent a whole county. Examples are London, which often played against county teams, and was in some respects almost a county club in itself; Slindon, which was for a few years in the 1740s effectively representative of Sussex as a county; Dartford, sometimes representative of Kent; and the Hambledon Club, certainly representative of Hampshire, and also perhaps of Sussex. One of the best county teams in the late 18th century was Berkshire, which no longer has first-class status.

=== Formation of county clubs in England and Wales ===
Numerous sources list the foundation dates of the county clubs. Note that some, like Cambridgeshire, were re-founded after an earlier version became defunct. The dates below are taken from the 1982 edition of Wisden Cricketers' Almanack:

- Bedfordshire – 1899
- Berkshire – 1895
- Buckinghamshire – 1891
- Cambridgeshire – 1844 to 1869; 1891
- Carmarthenshire – 1908 to 1911
- Cheshire – 1908
- Cornwall – 1894
- Cumberland – 1948 (Note: Cumberland CCC was called the Cumberland and Westmorland County Cricket Club until 1955.)
- Denbighshire – 1930 to 1935
- Derbyshire – 1870
- Devon – 1867 to 1897; 1899
- Dorset – 1896
- Durham – 1882
- Essex – 1876
- Glamorgan – 1888
- Gloucestershire – 1871
- Hampshire – 1863
- Herefordshire – 1836 to unknown; 1992
- Hertfordshire – 1876
- Huntingdonshire – 1831 to 1895; 1948
- Kent – 1842
- Lancashire – 1864
- Leicestershire – 1879
- Lincolnshire – 1906
- Middlesex – 1864
- Monmouthshire – 1901 to 1934
- Norfolk – 1827 to c.1850; 1876
- Northamptonshire – 1878
- Northumberland – 1895
- Nottinghamshire – 1841
- Oxfordshire – 1921
- Shropshire – 1956
- Somerset – 1875
- Staffordshire – 1871
- Suffolk – 1932
- Surrey – 1845
- Sussex – 1839
- Wales Minor Counties – 1988
- Warwickshire – 1882
- Wiltshire – 1893
- Worcestershire – 1865
- Yorkshire – 1863

=== Qualification rules ===
An important year was 1873, when player qualification rules came into force, requiring players to choose at the start of each season whether they would play for the county of their birth or their county of residence. Before this, it was quite common for a player to play for both counties during the course of a single season. At The Oval on 9 June 1873, the following rules were decided on:

- That no cricketer, whether amateur or professional, shall play for more than one county during the same season.
- Every cricketer born in one county and residing in another shall be free to choose at the commencement of each season for which of those counties he will play, and shall, during that season, play for the one county only.
- A cricketer shall be qualified to play for the county in which he is residing and has resided for the previous two years: or a cricketer may elect to play for the county in which his family home is, so long as it remains open to him as an occasional residence.
- That should any question arise as to the residential qualification, the same shall be left to the decision of the Marylebone Cricket Club.

The rules were gradually relaxed, but they still affected or delayed moves between counties by players, such as Tom Graveney in 1961 and Bob Willis in 1972. The removal in 1968 of residential duration rules for overseas players led to an influx of star names: Garfield Sobers, Clive Lloyd, Barry Richards and Richard Hadlee all signed for English counties. Yorkshire kept its own rule that players must have been born locally until 1992.

=== Modern county cricket ===
All County Championship matches prior to 1988 were scheduled for three days, normally of a nominal six hours each plus intervals, but often with the first two days lengthened by up to an hour and the final day shortened, so that teams with fixtures elsewhere on the following day could travel at sensible hours. The exception to this was the 1919 season, when there was an experiment with two-day matches played over longer hours, up to nine o'clock in the evening in mid-summer. This experiment was not repeated. From 1988 to 1992 some matches were played over four days. From 1993 onward, all County Championship matches have been scheduled for four days.

Due to falling attendances in the Championship in the 1950s, the English and Welsh county clubs decided to play their first one-day cricket competition, the Gillette Cup, in 1963. This was accompanied by the John Player League annually from 1969 and the Benson & Hedges Cup from 1972. In the 21st century, the ECB has founded other limited-overs competitions: the Twenty20 Cup (now T20 Blast), the ECB 40 and the One-Day Cup.

=== Women's county cricket ===
Under the Women's Cricket Association, founded in 1926, the first women's county match took place in 1930, Durham v Lancashire & Cheshire at Castle Eden. Yorkshire's women's team first played in 1935. The Women's Area Championship (1980–1996) involved county teams and regional ones. The Women's County Championship was a 50-over competition, played each year from 1997 to 2019. The Twenty20 Super League (2016–2019) included some county teams, in a divisional structure. From 2020 to 2024, women's top-level domestic cricket was regionalised, as teams comprised multiple counties. County teams returned in 2025, now in professional competitions, the Women's One-Day Cup and T20 Blast.

== Teams ==
=== First-class counties ===
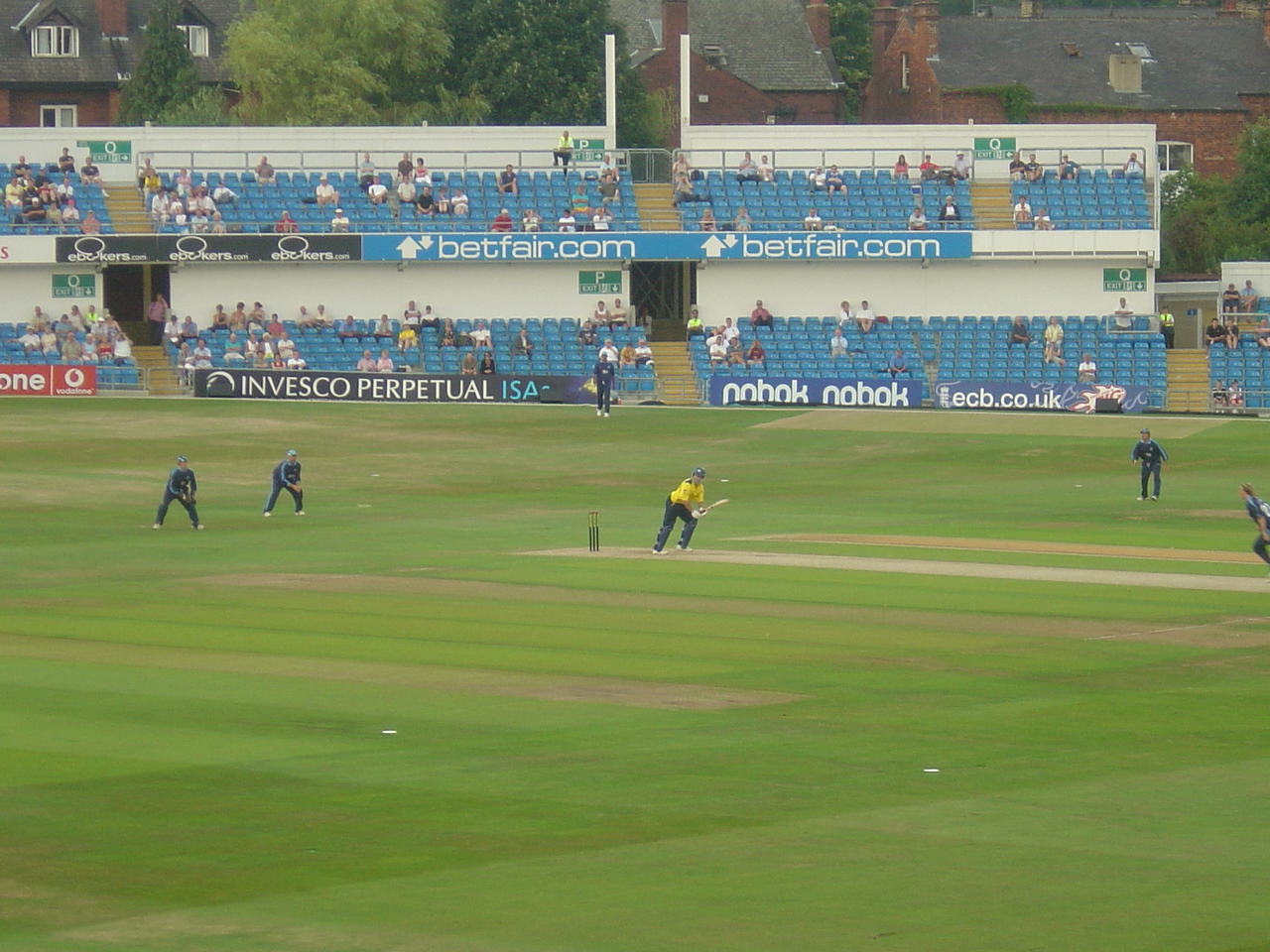
Yorkshire v Surrey at Headingley, Leeds in 2005

The eighteen first-class counties are the top county cricket teams. They represent 17 historic English counties and one Welsh county.

The first-class counties are:

- Derbyshire
- Durham
- Essex
- Glamorgan
- Gloucestershire
- Hampshire
- Kent
- Lancashire
- Leicestershire
- Middlesex
- Northamptonshire
- Nottinghamshire
- Somerset
- Surrey
- Sussex
- Warwickshire
- Worcestershire
- Yorkshire

The full name of each club is the name of the county followed by the words County Cricket Club, often abbreviated as CCC.

=== Other teams with first-class status ===
==== MCC ====
The opening first-class game of an English and Welsh county cricket season has traditionally been played at Lord's between the Marylebone Cricket Club (MCC) and the Champion County (the club that won the County Championship the previous year). When the MCC plays against one of the first-class counties, the game is granted first-class status.

==== MCC Universities ====
The six MCC-sponsored University (MCCU) teams were until 2020 also afforded first-class status for some of their matches against a first-class county. They were:

- Cambridge University (1827–2020)
- Oxford University (1827–2020)
- Cambridge MCCU (2001–2019)
- Oxford MCCU (2001–2019)
- Durham MCCU (2001–2019)
- Loughborough MCCU (2003–2019)
- Cardiff MCCU (2012–2019)
- Leeds/Bradford MCCU (2012–2019)

Most of the first-class counties play three-day games against university cricket teams in the early part of the English and Welsh cricket season. This is partly because the start of the cricket season coincides with the end of the university academic year, and partly because the games act as pre-season warm-ups for the county clubs.

=== National counties ===
The National Counties, known prior to 2020 as the Minor Counties, are the cricketing counties of England and Wales that are not afforded first-class status.

A single team represents the counties of Wales other than Glamorgan. There are no representative teams carrying the names of the historic counties of Cumberland and Westmorland which are both covered by Cumbria. Present members are:

Eastern Division

- Bedfordshire
- Buckinghamshire
- Cambridgeshire
- Cumbria
- Hertfordshire
- Lincolnshire
- Norfolk
- Northumberland
- Staffordshire
- Suffolk

Western Division

- Berkshire
- Cheshire
- Cornwall
- Devon
- Dorset
- Herefordshire
- Oxfordshire
- Shropshire
- ( (Anglesey) (Caernarfonshire) (Cardiganshire) (Flintshire (historic)) (Merionethshire) (Monmouthshire (historic)) (Pembrokeshire)) Wales
- Wiltshire

=== Other teams ===
Some teams outside of the English counties have been allowed to take part in some English and Welsh county cricket one-day competitions. They include:

- Ireland
- Netherlands
- Scotland
- Denmark
- Unicorns
- Huntingdonshire club are academy level.

== Competitions ==
=== First-class cricket ===
The County Championship is the domestic first-class cricket competition in England and Wales. The tournament currently has a two-division format with ten counties in Division One and eight in Division Two.

=== One-day cricket ===
The One-Day Cup is a 50-overs-per-side competition in county cricket, contested by the 18 first-class counties. The 18 sides are divided randomly into two groups of nine, with each team playing each other once. The top four in each group reach the quarter-finals. The competition replaced the Yorkshire Bank 40-over League. The first winners of the One-Day Cup were Durham in 2014. The ECB has been criticised for neglecting the One-Day Cup since 2020, as it is staged while counties' top players are unavailable.

The Women's One-Day Cup began in 2025 with all 18 major counties competing, in two divisions.

=== Twenty20 cricket ===
The T20 Blast, originally founded as the Twenty20 Cup in 2003, is the top Twenty20 cricket competition contested by the eighteen first-class counties. The games are limited to 20 overs per side, and the emphasis is on fast action.

The Women's T20 Blast began in 2025, in close co-operation with the men's competition.

=== National counties cricket ===
The competitions of National Counties cricket, formerly Minor Counties cricket, are the National Counties Cricket Championship and the NCCA Knockout Trophy.

The first league season was in the 19th century, the 1895 Minor Counties Championship.

Four clubs which used to play in the Minor Counties Championship have been granted first-class status: Worcestershire in 1899; Northamptonshire in 1905; Glamorgan in 1921 and Durham in 1992.

== Bibliography ==
- Wisden (1982). Woodcock, John (ed.). Wisden Cricketers' Almanack (119th ed.). London: Queen Anne Press. ISBN 978-03-56085-91-3.
