= Somerset Women cricket team =

English county cricket team

Somerset Women

Personnel
- Captain: Sophie Luff
- Coach: Erin Osborne
- Overseas player: TBC

Team information
- Founded: 1953
- Home ground: Various including Taunton Vale Sports Club Ground

History
- WCC wins: 0
- T20 Cup wins: 0
- Official website: Somerset Women

The Somerset Women cricket team is the women's representative cricket team for the English ceremonial county of Somerset. They play their home games at various grounds across Somerset, most often in Taunton, and are captained by Sophie Luff. Somerset consistently competed in either Division 1 or Division 2 of the Women's County Championship, and won Division 2 of the Women's Twenty20 Cup in 2019. In 2021, they won the West Midlands Group of the Twenty20 Cup. They were formerly partnered with the regional team Western Storm.

== History ==
=== 1953–1999: Early History ===
Somerset Women first formed in 1953, and played their first recorded match on 6 June that year, against Gloucestershire A. After this, Somerset played various one-off games, whilst West of England Women, which included Somerset, played in the Women's Area Championship from 1980 until 1996 and the Women's County Championship from 1997 until 1999.

=== 2000– : Women's County Championship ===
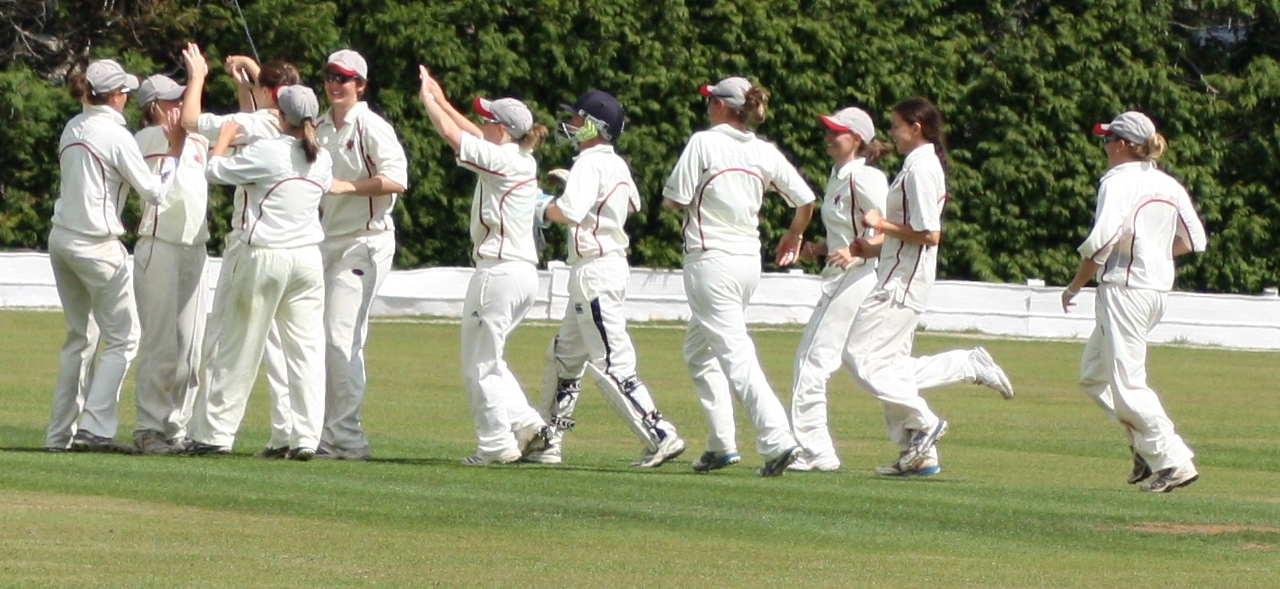
Somerset players celebrate a wicket in 2010

Somerset replaced West of England Women in the County Championship in 2000, and finished 3rd in Division 2 in their first season. Somerset remained in the second division until 2005, when they were promoted. This then began a period in which Somerset bounced between the two divisions, being promoted in 2008, 2011, 2015 and 2017 and relegated in 2006, 2010, 2012, 2016 and 2018. Somerset also missed out on promotion in play-offs in 2013 and 2014, with the game being abandoned in 2013 and losing to Warwickshire Women in 2014. In 2019, Somerset finished second-bottom of Division 2.

Somerset have fared similarly in the Women's Twenty20 Cup, for example winning promotion to Division 1 in 2014 and 2016 before being relegated in the following seasons. In 2019, Somerset won Division 2 with 6 victories from 8 games. Following the 2019 season, women's cricket in England was restructured and the 2020 season was cancelled due to the COVID-19 pandemic. In 2021, only the Twenty20 Cup took place, with Somerset competing in the West Midlands Group. They won their regional division, winning 5 of their 8 matches. Somerset bowler Lorraine Szczepanski was the second-highest wicket-taker in the tournament, with 13 wickets, and batters Georgia Hennessy and Sophie Luff were the 2nd and 4th leading run-scorers, respectively. They finished second in their group in the 2022 Women's Twenty20 Cup and subsequently progressed to the group final, where they lost to Warwickshire. In the 2023 Women's Twenty20 Cup, all of the side's group stage matches were rained-off, but they beat Devon and Wales on the group Finals Day to win their group. They also played various 50-over friendlies against other sides in the South West. In 2024, the side finished 2nd in their group in the Twenty20 Cup and 5th in their group in the new ECB Women's County One-Day tournament.

Somerset have had various notable players appear for them over the years, most prominently the former England players Anya Shrubsole and Fran Wilson.

== Players ==
=== Current squad ===
- No. denotes the player's squad number, as worn on the back of their shirt.
- ‡ denotes players with international caps.

No.	Name	Nationality	Birth date	Batting style	Bowling style	Notes
Batters
5	Heather Knight ‡	England	26 December 1990 (age 35)	Right-handed	Right-arm off break	England central contract
18	Rebecca Odgers	England	10 February 2003 (age 23)	Right-handed	Right-arm off break	
21	Emma Corney	England	15 September 2003 (age 23)	Right-handed	Right-arm medium	
63	Sophie Luff	England	6 December 1993 (age 32)	Right-handed	Right-arm medium	Club captain
All-rounders
24	Charlie Dean ‡	England	22 December 2000 (age 25)	Right-handed	Right-arm off break	England central contract
25	Alex Griffiths	Wales	12 June 2002 (age 24)	Right-handed	Right-arm medium	
27	Niamh Holland	England	27 October 2004 (age 21)	Right-handed	Right-arm medium	
28	Dani Gibson ‡	England	30 April 2001 (age 25)	Right-handed	Right-arm medium	England central contract
Wicket-keepers
22	Jess Hazell	England	22 August 2004 (age 22)	Right-handed	—	
38	Katie Jones	England	28 December 2005 (age 20)	Right-handed	—	
Bowlers
2	Bea Willis	England	21 November 2004 (age 21)	Right-handed	Right-arm medium	
14	Mollie Robbins	England	4 October 1998 (age 27)	Right-handed	Right-arm medium	
16	Erin Vukusic ‡	Croatia	16 December 2005 (age 20)	Right-handed	Right-arm medium	
20	Chloe Skelton	England	20 June 2001 (age 25)	Right-handed	Right-arm off break	
23	Lola Harris	England	20 October 2006 (age 19)	Right-handed	Right-arm leg break	
45	Ellie Anderson	England	30 October 2003 (age 22)	Right-handed	Right-arm medium	
95	Olivia Barnes	England	9 July 2006 (age 20)	Right-handed	Slow left-arm orthodox	
Source: Updated: 1 October 2026

=== Notable players ===
Players who have played for Somerset and played internationally are listed below, in order of first international appearance (given in brackets):

- (England) Audrey Disbury (1957)
- (England) Janet Godman (1991)
- (England) Sarah Collyer (1998)
- (England) Katharine Winks (1998)
- (England) Laura Harper (1999)
- (England) Jackie Hawker (1999)
- (England) Hannah Lloyd (1999)
- (England) Kath Wilkins (1999)
- (England) Caroline Atkins (2001)
- (Netherlands) Isabelle Westbury (2005)
- (England) Steph Davies (2008)
- (England) Anya Shrubsole (2008)
- (England) Heather Knight (2010)
- (England) Fran Wilson (2010)
- (South Africa) Lizelle Lee (2013)
- (Australia) Amanda-Jade Wellington (2016)
- (England) Charlie Dean (2021)
- (England) Lauren Filer (2023)
- (England) Dani Gibson (2023)
- (Croatia) Erin Vukusic (2024)

== Seasons ==
=== Women's County Championship ===
Season	Division	League standings								Notes
Season	Division	P	W	L	T	A/C	BP	Pts	Pos	Notes
2000	Division 2	5	3	2	0	0	37	73	3rd	
2001	Division 2	5	3	2	0	0	34	70	3rd	
2002	Division 2	5	1	2	0	2	18	52	4th	
2003	Division 2	5	2	3	0	0	32.5	56.5	4th	
2004	Division 2	5	4	1	0	0	41	89	1st	
2005	Division 2	6	4	1	0	1	42.5	101.5	1st	Promoted
2006	Division 1	6	1	5	0	0	13	33	4th	Relegated
2007	Division 2	6	3	2	0	1	4	89	3rd	
2008	Division 2	6	4	2	0	0	6	86	2nd	Promoted
2009	Division 1	10	3	7	0	0	14	74	4th	
2010	Division 1	10	2	8	0	0	40	60	6th	Relegated
2011	Division 2	10	5	3	0	2	52	102	3rd	Promoted
2012	Division 1	8	0	4	0	4	21	21	9th	Relegated
2013	Division 2	8	7	1	0	0	48	118	2nd	Won Division 2 final; Lost promotion play-off
2014	Division 2	8	6	2	0	0	53	113	2nd	Lost promotion play-off
2015	Division 2	8	6	0	0	2	45	105	1st	Promoted
2016	Division 1	8	2	5	0	1	29	49	7th	Relegated
2017	Division 2	7	5	1	0	1	41	91	2nd	Promoted
2018	Division 1	7	1	5	1	0	31	46	8th	Relegated
2019	Division 2	7	1	6	0	0	43	53	7th	

=== Women's Twenty20 Cup ===
Season	Division	League standings								Notes
Season	Division	P	W	L	T	A/C	NRR	Pts	Pos	Notes
2009	Division 2	3	2	0	0	1	+1.23	5	1st	
2010	Division S&W 1	3	1	2	0	0	−0.39	2	3rd	
2011	Division S&W 1	3	1	2	0	0	+0.33	2	3rd	
2012	Division S&W 1	3	2	1	0	0	+1.41	4	2nd	
2013	Division S&W 1	3	3	0	0	0	+5.78	6	1st	Lost group final
2014	Division 2C	4	3	1	0	0	+2.50	12	2nd	Promoted
2015	Division 1	8	2	5	0	1	−0.59	9	8th	Relegated
2016	Division 2	7	5	2	0	0	+0.78	20	1st	Promoted
2017	Division 1	8	1	5	0	2	−1.35	6	8th	Relegated
2018	Division 2	8	4	4	0	0	+0.80	16	5th	
2019	Division 2	8	6	2	0	0	−0.03	24	1st	
2021	West Midlands	8	5	1	0	2	+1.75	22	1st	Group winners
2022	Group 3	6	4	2	0	0	+0.72	16	2nd	Lost final
2023	Group 8	6	0	0	0	6	+0.00	6	3rd	Group winners
2024	Group 4	8	6	2	0	0	+0.84	96	2nd	

=== ECB Women's County One-Day ===
Season	Group	League standings								Notes
Season	Group	P	W	L	T	A/C	BP	Pts	Pos	Notes
2024	Group 3	4	1	2	1	0	1	7	5th	

== Honours ==
- County Championship:
  - Division Two champions (4) – 2004, 2005, 2013 & 2015
- Women's Twenty20 Cup:
  - Division Two champions (2) – 2009, 2016 & 2019
  - Group winners (2) – 2021 & 2023

== See also ==
- Somerset County Cricket Club
- Western Storm
