= Women's County Championship =

County Championship
- Administrator: England and Wales Cricket Board
- Format: Limited overs cricket
- First edition: 1997
- Latest edition: 2019
- Tournament format: League system in three divisions
- Number of teams: 35
- Current champion: Kent (2019)
- Most successful: Kent (8 titles)

The Women's County Championship, known since 2014 as the Royal London Women's One-Day Cup, was a women's cricket competition organised by the England and Wales Cricket Board. It was the women's equivalent of the County Championship, although it operated as a 50-over limited overs cricket competition with teams organised into a number of divisions. It was introduced in 1997 to replace the Women's Area Championship.

The teams competing in the Championship were drawn mostly from the historic counties of England, with 32 teams representing these. The Scottish national team competed in the competition since 2007, the Wales women's national cricket team since 2008 and the Netherlands joined in 2009. The Ireland national team played in the competition between 2009 and 2015 before withdrawing in early 2016.

The competition was the longest established women's cricket competition in England and Wales. It operated alongside the Women's Twenty20 Cup, established in 2009, and the Women's Cricket Super League between 2016 and 2019, a franchise league with six teams playing Twenty20 cricket.

2019, won by Kent, was the final season of the Championship due to a restructuring of women's cricket in England. From 2020, the only 50-over tournament was competed by regional teams, initially in the Rachael Heyhoe Flint Trophy. Kent were the most successful county in the history of the Championship with eight titles, whilst Sussex and Yorkshire both won six titles.

== History ==
The inaugural Women's County Championship took place in 1997, with 16 teams competing in three divisions. This first tournament was organised and run by the Women's Cricket Association, which voted to merge with the England and Wales Cricket Board (ECB) on 29 March 1998. As such, the ECB has administered the competition since 1998.

Yorkshire were the winners of five of the first six Championships, with East Midlands breaking their run in 1999. After this began a period that was dominated by Sussex and Kent. Sussex won six titles between 2003 and 2013, including three in a row between 2003 and 2005, whilst Kent won eight titles between 2006 and 2019. Yorkshire managed one more title, in 2015, whilst Lancashire and Hampshire have won one title apiece, in 2017 and 2018, respectively. Hampshire's title came after a remarkable rise through the divisions, winning Division 3 in 2015 and Division 2 in 2017 before being crowned County Champions one year later.

2019 marked the final year of the County Championship as women's cricket in England was restructured by the ECB, paving the way for a regionalised 50-over tournament, as well as the Women's Hundred. A similar tournament, but with no national winner, was introduced ahead of the 2024 season, in the form of the ECB Women's County One-Day.

== Structure ==
The Championship operated on a league structure, with varying amounts of divisions and teams over its history. The first Championship involved 16 teams split across three divisions. Gradually more teams were added over the years (and county teams replaced the regional and Second XI teams that initially competed), and in 2004, which had 24 participants, a second tier was added, the County Challenge Cup. In 2008 (which had 33 teams participating) the Challenge Cup was ended and teams were placed in Divisions 1 to 5. This became four divisions in 2012 and finally three divisions in 2017, a structure that continued until the Championship ended in 2019.

Varying amounts of teams have participated in the Championship over the years, reaching a peak of 38 teams in 2015. 35 teams competed in the final season of the Championship in 2019. The teams that have participated in the tournament are:

County Championship Teams
Team	First	Last
Berkshire	2000	2019
Buckinghamshire	2010	2019
Cambridgeshire and Huntingdonshire	2010	2019
Cheshire	1998	2016
Cornwall	2005	2019
Cumbria	2001	2019
Derbyshire	1997	2019
Devon	2005	2019
Dorset	2005	2019
Durham	2001	2019
East Anglia	1997	2000
East Midlands	1997	1999
Essex	2001	2019
Gloucestershire	2007	2019
Hampshire	1997	2019
Hertfordshire	2001	2019
Ireland	2009	2015
Kent	1997	2019
Lancashire	1998	2019
Lancashire and Cheshire	1997	1997
Leicestershire and Rutland	2004	2019
Lincolnshire	2015	2019
Middlesex	1997	2019
Netherlands	2009	2019
Norfolk	2002	2019
Northamptonshire	2001	2019
Northumberland	1998	2019
Nottinghamshire	2000	2019
Oxfordshire	2007	2019
Scotland	2007	2019
Shropshire	2008	2018
Somerset	2000	2019
Staffordshire	2000	2019
Suffolk	2007	2019
Surrey	1997	2019
Surrey Second XI	1997	2000
Sussex	1997	2019
Sussex Second XI	1997	2000
Thames Valley	1997	1999
Wales	2004	2019
Warwickshire	2001	2019
Wiltshire	2001	2019
West	1997	1999
West Midlands	1997	1999
Worcestershire	2004	2019
Yorkshire	1997	2019
Yorkshire Second XI	1997	2000

== Roll of honour ==
Year	Champions	Runners-up	Leading run-scorer	Leading wicket-taker	Refs
1997	Yorkshire	West Midlands	Jane Smit (East Midlands) 429	Helen Pack (West Midlands) 11	
1998	Yorkshire	Surrey	Charlotte Edwards (East Anglia) 394	Sarah Clarke (Surrey Second XI) 12	
1999	East Midlands	Yorkshire	Jane Smit (East Midlands) 335	Janet Tedstone (Yorkshire Second XI); Dawn Holden (East Midlands); Beth Morgan (Middlesex) 13	
2000	Yorkshire	Nottinghamshire	Charlotte Edwards (Kent) 374	Nicky Myers (Nottinghamshire) 13	
2001	Yorkshire	Berkshire	Arran Brindle (Lancashire) 274	Yvonne Craven (Berkshire); Susanne White (Lancashire) 13	
2002	Yorkshire	Berkshire	Charlotte Edwards (Kent) 233	Vicky Borman (Hertfordshire) 14	
2003	Sussex	Nottinghamshire	Taryn Keir (Warwickshire) 303	Lynne Spooner (Derbyshire) 12	
2004	Sussex	Kent	Charlotte Edwards (Kent) 308	Heather Booth (Berkshire) 12	
2005	Sussex	Kent	Charlotte Edwards (Kent) 302	Judith Turner (Berkshire); Dawn Prestidge (Cheshire) 10	
2006	Kent	Sussex	Jenny Gunn (Nottinghamshire) 356	Charlotte Edwards (Kent) 12	
2007	Kent	Sussex	Emily Drumm (Kent) 222	Lynsey Askew (Kent) 13	
2008	Sussex	Kent	Heather Knight (Devon) 390	Isabelle Westbury (Somerset); Hannah Courtnell (Essex); Charlotte Anneveld (Kent) 12	
2009	Kent	Sussex	Heather Knight (Devon) 622	Charlotte Anneveld (Kent) 24	
2010	Sussex	Kent	Lydia Greenway (Kent) 628	Danielle Wyatt (Staffordshire) 24	
2011	Kent	Sussex	Charlotte Edwards (Kent) 541	Jane Riddell (Durham) 28	
2012	Kent	Essex	Sarah Taylor (Sussex) 345	Isobelle Watson (Warwickshire) 18	
2013	Sussex	Yorkshire	Heather Knight (Berkshire) 604	Jenny Withers (Somerset) 20	
2014	Kent	Surrey	Charlotte Edwards (Kent) 491	Jo Gardner (Northamptonshire) 19	
2015	Yorkshire	Kent	Charlotte Taylor (Hampshire) 422	Sarah Clarke (Surrey) 23	
2016	Kent	Sussex	Kirstie White (Surrey) 337	Samantha Betts (Hampshire) 18	
2017	Lancashire	Yorkshire	Suzie Bates (Hampshire) 494	Sophie Ecclestone (Lancashire) 27	
2018	Hampshire	Yorkshire	Suzie Bates (Hampshire) 358	Kirstie Gordon (Nottinghamshire) 23	
2019	Kent	Yorkshire	Sophia Dunkley (Middlesex) 451	Katie Thompson (Yor); Natalie Rowbottom (Lin); Rebecca Silk (Dev); Beth Langston (Yor) 15	

== See also ==
- Women's Area Championship
- Super Fours
- Women's Twenty20 Cup
- Women's Cricket Super League
- Rachael Heyhoe Flint Trophy
