= 1998 Women's County Championship =

- Administrator(s): England and Wales Cricket Board
- Cricket format: 50 over
- Tournament format(s): League system
- Champions: Yorkshire (2nd title)
- Participants: 18
- Most runs: Charlotte Edwards (394)
- Most wickets: Sarah Clarke (12)

The 1998 Women's County One-Day Championship was the 2nd cricket Women's County Championship season. It took place in July and saw 10 county teams, 3 county Second XIs and 5 regional teams compete in a series of divisions. Yorkshire Women won the County Championship as winners of the top division, achieving their second Championship title in two seasons.

== Competition format ==
Teams played matches within a series of divisions with the winners of the top division being crowned County Champions. Matches were played using a one day format with 50 overs per side.

The championship works on a points system with positions within the divisions being based on the total points. Points were awarded as follows:

Win: 12 points.
Tie: 6 points.
Loss: Bonus points.
No Result: 11 points.
Abandoned: 11 points.

Up to five batting and five bowling points per side were also available.

== Teams ==
The 1998 Championship consisted of 18 teams, competing in three divisions of six teams apiece. Teams played each other once.

Division One	Kent	Surrey	Thames Valley	West Midlands	West of England	Yorkshire
Division Two	Derbyshire	East Anglia	East Midlands	Middlesex	Sussex	Yorkshire Second XI
Division Three	Cheshire	Hampshire	Lancashire	Northumberland	Surrey Second XI	Sussex Second XI

== Division One ==
Team	Pld	W	L	T	A	Bat	Bowl	Ded	Pts
Yorkshire (C)	5	5	0	0	0	19.5	20.5	0	100
Surrey	5	4	1	0	0	18.5	16	0	82.5
Kent	5	2	3	0	0	16.5	20	0	60.5
West Midlands	5	2	3	0	0	15	18	0	57
Thames Valley	5	2	3	0	0	15.5	14.5	0	54
West of England (R)	5	0	5	0	0	16	17.5	0	33.5

Source: Cricket Archive

== Division Two ==
Team	Pld	W	L	T	A	Bat	Bowl	Ded	Pts
East Midlands (P)	5	4	1	0	0	20	18.5	0	86.5
Yorkshire Second XI	5	4	1	0	0	16.5	21	0	85.5
East Anglia	5	3	2	0	0	18	14	0	68
Sussex	5	2	3	0	0	15.5	15.5	0	55
Derbyshire	5	1	4	0	0	14	18.5	0	44.5
Middlesex (R)	5	1	4	0	0	12	14	0	38

Source: Cricket Archive

== Division Three ==
Team	Pld	W	L	T	A	Bat	Bowl	Ded	Pts
Cheshire (P)	5	5	0	0	0	19.5	23.5	0	103
Surrey Second XI	5	4	1	0	0	17	24.5	0	89.5
Lancashire	5	3	2	0	0	17	18.5	0	72
Hampshire	5	2	3	0	0	15	21	0	60
Northumberland	5	1	4	0	0	10	17	0	39
Sussex Second XI	5	0	5	0	0	8.5	11.5	0	20

Source: Cricket Archive

== Statistics ==
=== Most runs ===
Player	Team	Matches	Innings	Runs	Average	HS	100s	50s
Charlotte Edwards	East Anglia	5	5	394	98.50	133	3	0
Allyson Byrne	Cheshire	5	5	234	58.50	80	0	2
Kathryn Leng	Yorkshire	5	5	232	58.00	66	0	2
Sarah Collyer	Cheshire	5	5	231	46.20	113	1	1
Janet Tedstone	Yorkshire Second XI	5	5	226	56.50	61	0	2

Source: CricketArchive

=== Most wickets ===
Player	Team	Balls	Wickets	Average	BBI	5w
Sarah Clarke	Surrey Second XI	152	12	7.83	5/36	1
Wendy Watson	Derbyshire	189	11	11.45	4/32	0
Janet Tedstone	Yorkshire Second XI	232	10	9.30	3/26	0
Sara MacLean	Northumberland	222	10	9.30	3/26	0
Lucy McGrother	Lancashire	300	10	13.30	4/26	0

Source: CricketArchive
