= Cheshire Women cricket team =

English county cricket team

Cheshire Women

Team information
- Founded: Unknown First recorded match: 1930
- Home ground: Various Including Chester Boughton Hall, Chester

History
- WCC wins: 0
- T20 Cup wins: 0
- Official website: Cheshire Cricket Board

The Cheshire Women's cricket team is the women's representative cricket team for the English historic county of Cheshire. They joined the Women's County Championship in 1998 and competed in the tournament until 2016, as well as competing in the Women's Twenty20 Cup between 2009 and 2019. The team no longer competes at senior county level. They are partnered with the regional side North West Thunder.

== History ==
=== 1930–1937: Early History ===
The first recorded match involving Cheshire Women took place in 1930, which they lost to Durham Women. After this, they played various one-off matches, often combined with neighbouring Lancashire, as Lancashire and Cheshire, under which they competed in the Women's Area Championship and the first Women's County Championship, in 1997.

=== 1998– : National Competition ===
Cheshire Women joined the County Championship in 1998, replacing Lancashire and Cheshire Women, and won Division 3 in their first season. Since then, Cheshire bounced between Divisions 2 and 3, with their longest stay in Division 2 being between 2009 and 2014. They also managed two successive promotions in 2004 and 2005. Cheshire Women withdrew from the County Championship after the 2016 season, after which they only participated in the Women's Twenty20 Cup, in which they were often in the lowest tier of the competition, but did win promotion to Division 2 in 2017. Since 2019, Cheshire have not competed at senior county level.

== Players ==
=== Notable players ===
Players who have played for Cheshire and played internationally are listed below, in order of first international appearance (given in brackets):

- (England) Laura Newton (1997)
- (England) Sarah Collyer (1998)
- (Australia) Megan White (1999)
- (Pakistan) Zehmarad Afzal (2000)
- (England) Lauren Griffiths (2010)
- (England) Sophie Ecclestone (2016)
- (England) Seren Smale (2024)

== Seasons ==
=== Women's County Championship ===
Season	Division	League standings								Notes
Season	Division	P	W	L	T	A/C	BP	Pts	Pos	Notes
1998	Division 3	5	5	0	0	0	43	103	1st	Promoted
1999	Division 2	5	3	2	0	0	26	50	4th	
2000	Division 2	5	2	3	0	0	29.5	53.5	4th	
2001	Division 2	5	1	4	0	0	25.5	37.5	6th	Relegated
2002	Division 3	5	2	1	0	2	22.5	68.5	3rd	
2003	Division 3	5	2	2	1	0	36	66	4th	
2004	County Challenge Cup G1	3	3	0	0	0	27.5	63.5	1st	Promoted
2005	Division 3	6	4	1	0	1	38.5	97.5	1st	Promoted
2006	Division 2	6	0	4	0	2	11	19	4th	Relegated
2007	Division 3	6	1	2	0	3	7	62	3rd	
2008	Division 3	6	2	4	0	0	13	53	3rd	Promoted
2009	Division 2	10	2	7	0	1	44	64	4th	
2010	Division 2	10	4	6	0	0	19	99	5th	
2011	Division 2	10	3	6	0	1	47	77	5th	
2012	Division 2	8	3	3	0	2	35	65	5th	
2013	Division 2	8	3	4	0	1	38	68	6th	
2014	Division 2	8	1	7	0	0	34	44	9th	Relegated
2015	Division 3	8	3	3	0	2	35	65	5th	
2016	Division 3	8	1	6	0	1	24	34	8th	

=== Women's Twenty20 Cup ===
Season	Division	League standings								Notes
Season	Division	P	W	L	T	A/C	NRR	Pts	Pos	Notes
2009	Division 3	3	1	1	0	1	+1.08	3	2nd	
2010	Division M&N 1	3	1	2	0	0	–1.58	2	3rd	Relegated
2011	Division M&N 2	3	0	3	0	0	–0.25	0	4th	Relegated
2012	Division M&N 3	3	2	1	0	0	+1.62	4	2nd	Lost promotion play-off
2013	Division M&N 3	2	0	1	0	1	–0.73	1	3rd	
2014	Division 2A	4	2	2	0	0	+0.20	8	6th	
2015	Division 2	8	2	6	0	0	–1.39	8	8th	Relegated
2016	Division 3	8	3	4	0	1	–0.35	13	6th	
2017	Division 3B	8	7	1	0	0	+2.00	28	1st	Promoted
2018	Division 2	8	2	6	0	0	–0.86	8	6th	
2019	Division 2	8	1	7	0	0	–1.26	4	8th	

== See also ==
- Cheshire County Cricket Club
- North West Thunder
