= 1999 Women's County Championship =

- Administrator(s): England and Wales Cricket Board
- Cricket format: 50 over
- Tournament format(s): League system
- Champions: East Midlands (1st title)
- Participants: 18
- Most runs: Jane Smit (335)
- Most wickets: Janet Tedstone (13); Dawn Holden (13); Beth Morgan (13)

The 1999 Women's County One-Day Championship was the 3rd cricket Women's County Championship season. It took place in July and saw 10 county teams, 3 county Second XIs and 5 regional teams compete in a series of divisions. East Midlands Women won the County Championship as winners of the top division, achieving their first Championship title.

== Competition format ==
Teams played matches within a series of divisions with the winners of the top division being crowned County Champions. Matches were played using a one day format with 50 overs per side.

The championship works on a points system with positions within the divisions being based on the total points. Points were awarded as follows:

Win: 12 points.
Tie: 6 points.
Loss: Bonus points.
No Result: 11 points.
Abandoned: 11 points.

Up to five batting and five bowling points per side were also available.

== Teams ==
The 1999 Championship consisted of 18 teams, competing in three divisions of six teams apiece. Teams played each other once.

Division One	East Midlands	Kent	Surrey	Thames Valley	West Midlands	Yorkshire
Division Two	Cheshire	Derbyshire	East Anglia	West of England	Sussex	Yorkshire Second XI
Division Three	Hampshire	Lancashire	Middlesex	Northumberland	Surrey Second XI	Sussex Second XI

== Division One ==
Team	Pld	W	L	T	A	Bat	Bowl	Ded	Pts
East Midlands (C)	5	5	0	0	0	20.5	21.5	0	102
Yorkshire	5	3	2	0	0	17.5	23	0	76.5
Thames Valley	5	3	2	0	0	18	18.5	0	72.5
Surrey	5	2	3	0	0	17	15.5	0	56.5
Kent	5	2	3	0	0	15	15.5	0	54.5
West Midlands (R)	5	0	5	0	0	13.5	14.5	0	28

Source: Cricket Archive

== Division Two ==
Team	Pld	W	L	T	A	Bat	Bowl	Ded	Pts
Sussex (P)	5	5	0	0	0	15.5	23.5	0	99
West of England	5	4	1	0	0	17.5	20.5	0	86
Yorkshire Second XI	5	3	2	0	0	17	20.5	0	72
Cheshire	5	2	3	0	0	15	11	0	50
East Anglia	5	1	4	0	0	16.5	10	0	38.5
Derbyshire (R)	5	0	5	0	0	13	11	0	24

Source: Cricket Archive

== Division Three ==
Team	Pld	W	L	T	A	Bat	Bowl	Ded	Pts
Lancashire (P)	5	5	0	0	0	21.5	22.5	0	104
Middlesex	5	3	2	0	0	20	19	0	75
Hampshire	5	3	2	0	0	19	17.5	0	72.5
Surrey Second XI	5	3	2	0	0	14.5	21	0	71.5
Sussex Second XI	5	1	4	0	0	13	15.5	0	40.5
Northumberland	5	0	5	0	0	9	11.5	0	20.5

Source: Cricket Archive

== Statistics ==
=== Most runs ===
Player	Team	Matches	Innings	Runs	Average	HS	100s	50s
Jane Smit	Nottinghamshire	5	5	335	111.66	108*	1	3
Charlotte Edwards	East Anglia	5	5	306	76.50	118	1	2
Arran Brindle	Lancashire	5	5	228	76.00	111*	1	1
Debra Stock	Thames Valley	5	5	225	56.25	93	0	2
Val Leafe	Surrey	5	5	218	43.60	65	0	1

Source: CricketArchive

=== Most wickets ===
Player	Team	Balls	Wickets	Average	BBI	5w
Janet Tedstone	Yorkshire Second XI	276	13	8.30	5/24	1
Dawn Holden	East Midlands	295	13	10.00	4/32	0
Beth Morgan	Middlesex	300	13	12.07	4/19	0
Lorna Jesty	Hampshire	210	10	10.40	7/17	1
Julie Mann	Yorkshire	252	10	10.90	4/25	0

Source: CricketArchive
