= Nottinghamshire Women cricket team =

English county cricket team

Nottinghamshire Women

Personnel
- Captain: Kirstie Gordon
- Coach: Craig Cumming
- Overseas player: TBA

Team information
- Founded: Unknown First recorded match: 1934
- Home ground: John Fretwell Sporting Complex, Nettleworth, Warsop

History
- WCC wins: 0
- T20 Cup wins: 1
- Official website: Nottinghamshire Recreational Cricket

The Nottinghamshire Women's cricket team is the women's representative cricket team for the English historic county of Nottinghamshire. They play their home games at John Fretwell Sporting Complex, Nettleworth and are captained by Teresa Graves. In 2019, they played in Division One of the final season of the Women's County Championship, and in 2021 won the East Midlands Group of the Women's Twenty20 Cup. They are partnered with the East Midlands regional side The Blaze.

== History ==
=== 1934–1999: Early History ===
Nottinghamshire Women's first recorded match took place in 1934, which they lost to the Women's Cricket Association. They went on to play various one-off games against nearby teams, such as Warwickshire and Lincolnshire. East Midlands Women, which included players from Nottinghamshire, joined the Women's Area Championship in 1980, and was a founding member of the Women's County Championship. East Midlands won Division One of the Championship in 1999.

=== 2000– : Women's County Championship ===
Nottinghamshire replaced East Midlands in Division One of the County Championship for the 2000 season, finishing second with four out of five wins. Nottinghamshire remained in Division One for a further four seasons, finishing second again in 2003, but were relegated in 2004. After two seasons in Division 2, Nottinghamshire returned to Division One and remained a consistently mid-table side.

In 2009, Nottinghamshire played in the 2009 RSA T20 Cup, a tri-series in Ireland with Pakistan and Ireland. They finished bottom of the table, but managed one win against Ireland. In 2010, they joined the Women's Twenty20 Cup, placing 2nd in their regional division in their first season. They reached the semi-finals in 2013, but lost to eventual winners Kent. In 2014, however, Nottinghamshire were crowned the Champions of the tournament, first qualifying for Round 2 unbeaten, then finishing above Middlesex and Kent in the final group on Net Run Rate.

Since then, Nottinghamshire have had a brief stint in Division Two in both competitions, in 2016 in the Championship and 2017 in the T20 Cup. In both instances, they gained promotion at their first attempt. In 2019, they finished 6th in the Championship and 9th in the T20 Cup. In 2021, they competed in the East Midlands Group of the Twenty20 Cup, and won their region, going unbeaten with 5 wins and 3 matches abandoned due to rain. In 2022, they finished fourth in Group 1 of the Twenty20 Cup. In the 2023 Women's Twenty20 Cup, the side reached the group semi-final, where they lost to Lancashire. In 2024, the side finished 5th in their group in the Twenty20 Cup and 8th in their group in the new ECB Women's County One-Day tournament.

== Players ==
=== Current squad ===
- No. denotes the player's squad number, as worn on the back of their shirt.
- ‡ denotes players with international caps.

No.	Name	Nationality	Birth date	Batting style	Bowling style	Notes
Batters
12	Tammy Beaumont ‡	England	11 March 1991 (age 35)	Right-handed	Right-arm off break	England central contract
18	Prisha Thanawala	England	16 November 2006 (age 20)	Right-handed	Right-arm off break	
23	Marie Kelly	England	9 February 1996 (age 30)	Right-handed	Right-arm off break	
All-rounders
10	Nat Sciver-Brunt ‡	England	20 August 1992 (age 34)	Right-handed	Right-arm medium	England central contract
17	Kathryn Bryce ‡	Scotland	17 November 1997 (age 29)	Right-handed	Right-arm medium	
25	Michaela Kirk	South Africa	30 June 1999 (age 27)	Right-handed	Right-arm off break	UK passport
34	Georgia Elwiss ‡	England	31 May 1991 (age 35)	Right-handed	Right-arm medium	
88	Emma Jones	England	8 August 2002 (age 24)	Right-handed	Right-arm medium	
Wicket-keepers
8	Sarah Bryce ‡	Scotland	8 January 2000 (age 26)	Right-handed	—	
33	Ella Claridge ‡	United States	28 September 2002 (age 24)	Right-handed	Right-arm medium	UK passport
40	Amy Jones ‡	England	13 June 1993 (age 33)	Right-handed	—	England central contract
Bowlers
1	Grace Ballinger	England	3 April 2002 (age 24)	Left-handed	Left-arm medium	
6	Cassidy McCarthy	England	23 July 2002 (age 24)	Right-handed	Right-arm medium	
7	Lucy Higham	England	17 October 1997 (age 29)	Right-handed	Right-arm off break	
19	Charley Phillips	England	8 May 2003 (age 23)	Right-handed	Right-arm medium	
24	Kirstie Gordon ‡	Scotland (Note: Gordon has also played international cricket for England.)	20 October 1997 (age 29)	Right-handed	Slow left-arm orthodox	Club captain
42	Liv Baker	England	30 June 2006 (age 20)	Right-handed	Right-arm medium	
Source: Updated: 1 October 2026

=== Notable players ===
Players who have played for Nottinghamshire and played internationally are listed below, in order of first international appearance (given in brackets):

- (England) Betty Belton (1937)
- (England) Mona Greenwood (1937)
- (England) Annie Geeves (1951)
- (England) Karen Smithies (1986)
- (England) Wendy Watson (1987)
- (England) Jane Smit (1992)
- (England) Ella Donnison (1999)
- (England) Dawn Holden (1999)
- (England) Kate Lowe (1999)
- (England) Nicky Shaw (1999)
- (South Africa) Yulandi van der Merwe (2000)
- (England) Jenny Gunn (2004)
- (Australia) Leah Poulton (2006)
- (Australia) Rene Farrell (2007)
- (New Zealand) Lucy Doolan (2008)
- (England) Danni Wyatt (2010)
- (New Zealand) Maddy Green (2012)
- (Australia) Megan Schutt (2012)
- (England) Jodie Cook (2014)
- (England) Sonia Odedra (2014)
- (Scotland) Sarah Bryce (2018)
- (Scotland) Rachel Hawkins (2018)
- (England) Kirstie Gordon (2018)
- (Hong Kong) Jasmine Titmuss (2019)
- (New Zealand) Polly Inglis (2025)

== Seasons ==
=== Women's County Championship ===
Season	Division	League standings								Notes
Season	Division	P	W	L	T	A/C	BP	Pts	Pos	Notes
2000	Division 1	5	4	1	0	0	35.5	83.5	2nd	
2001	Division 1	5	3	2	0	0	33	69	4th	
2002	Division 1	5	1	2	0	2	20	54	4th	
2003	Division 1	5	4	1	0	0	38	86	2nd	
2004	Division 1	5	1	4	0	0	34.5	46.5	5th	Relegated
2005	Division 2	6	3	2	0	1	37.5	84.5	2nd	
2006	Division 2	6	4	1	0	1	4	88	1st	Promoted
2007	Division 1	6	1	4	0	1	12	47	3rd	
2008	Division 1	6	2	4	0	0	13	53	3rd	
2009	Division 1	10	6	4	0	0	17	137	3rd	
2010	Division 1	10	2	8	0	0	42	62	5th	
2011	Division 1	10	0	9	0	1	34	34	6th	
2012	Division 1	8	1	2	0	5	15	25	6th	
2013	Division 1	8	4	4	0	0	48	88	4th	
2014	Division 1	8	4	3	0	1	46	86	4th	
2015	Division 1	8	3	4	0	1	38	68	8th	Relegated
2016	Division 2	7	5	1	0	1	38	88	2nd	Promoted
2017	Division 1	7	4	3	0	0	48	88	4th	
2018	Division 1	7	2	4	1	0	38	63	6th	
2019	Division 1	7	3	4	0	0	45	75	6th	

=== Women's Twenty20 Cup ===
Season	Division	League standings								Notes
Season	Division	P	W	L	T	A/C	NRR	Pts	Pos	Notes
2010	Division M&N 1	3	2	1	0	0	+0.69	4	2nd	
2011	Division M&N 1	3	0	3	0	0	−2.09	0	4th	
2012	Division M&N 1	3	2	1	0	0	+0.70	4	2nd	
2013	Division M&N 1	3	3	0	0	0	+2.57	6	1st	Lost semi-final
2014	Division 1C	4	4	0	0	0	+0.92	16	1st	Champions
2015	Division 1	8	3	5	0	0	+0.45	12	6th	
2016	Division 1	7	2	4	0	1	−0.81	9	8th	Relegated
2017	Division 2	8	7	0	0	1	+1.44	29	1st	Promoted
2018	Division 1	8	4	4	0	0	+0.09	16	5th	
2019	Division 1	8	1	5	0	2	−0.78	6	9th	
2021	East Midlands	8	5	0	0	3	+1.66	23	1st	Group winners
2022	Group 1	6	3	3	0	0	−0.02	12	4th	
2023	Group 1	6	0	0	0	6	+0.00	6	4th	
2024	Group 1	7	3	3	0	1	–0.91	54	5th	

=== ECB Women's County One-Day ===
Season	Group	League standings								Notes
Season	Group	P	W	L	T	A/C	BP	Pts	Pos	Notes
2024	Group 1	4	0	4	0	0	0	0	8th	

== Honours ==
- County Championship:
  - Division Two champions (1) – 2006
- Women's Twenty20 Cup:
  - Champions (1) – 2014
  - Division Two champions (1) – 2017
  - Group winners (1) – 2021

== See also ==
- Nottinghamshire County Cricket Club
- The Blaze (women's cricket)
