= East Midlands Women cricket team =

English women's cricket team

East Midlands Women
Personnel
- Captain: Karen Smithies

Team information
- Founded: Unknown First recorded match: 1963
- Dissolved: 1999

History
- WAC wins: 3
- WCC wins: 1

The East Midlands Women's cricket team was the women's representative cricket team for the East Midlands. They competed in the Women's Area Championship from 1980 to 1996 and in the Women's County Championship from 1997 to 1999, after which they were replaced by Nottinghamshire. They won three Area Championships, and were also County Champions in their final season of competing in the tournament.

== History ==
East Midlands Women played their first recorded match in 1963, which they lost to a touring Australia side by 133 runs. East Midlands played Australia again in 1976, and played New Zealand in 1984, as well as playing various one-off games against other English sides. East Midlands joined the Women's Area Championship for its inaugural season in 1980, and played in the tournament until it ended in 1996. They, along with Yorkshire, dominated the final 10 years of the tournament, winning the title three teams and finishing as runners-up a further four times.

East Midlands joined the Women's County Championship upon its inception in 1997, playing in Division 2. They were promoted in 1998 and then were crowned Champions in 1999, winning all five of their matches to top Division 1. For the following season, however, East Midlands were replaced by Nottinghamshire and the team was disbanded.

== Players ==
=== Notable players ===
Players who played for East Midlands and played internationally are listed below, in order of first international appearance (noted in brackets):

- (England) Rachael Heyhoe Flint (1960)
- (England) Enid Bakewell (1968)
- (England) Karen Smithies (1987)
- (England) Jo Chamberlain (1987)
- (England) Wendy Watson (1987)
- (Republic of Ireland) Terri Bennett (1990)
- (England) Jane Smit (1992)
- (England) Sue Redfern (1995)
- (England) Ella Donnison (1999)
- (England) Dawn Holden (1999)
- (England) Kate Lowe (1999)
- (England) Nicky Shaw (1999)

== Seasons ==
=== Women's County Championship ===
Season	Division	League standings								Notes
Season	Division	P	W	L	T	A/C	BP	Pts	Pos	Notes
1997	Division 2	5	3	2	0	0	35.5	71.5	3rd	
1998	Division 2	5	4	1	0	0	38.5	86.5	1st	Promoted
1999	Division 1	5	5	0	0	0	42	102	1st	Champions

== Honours ==
- Women's Area Championship:
  - Champions – 1989, 1990, 1991
- Women's County Championship:
  - Champions – 1999

== See also ==
- Nottinghamshire Women cricket team
- List of defunct English women's cricket teams
