= West Midlands Women cricket team =

English women's cricket team

West Midlands Women
Personnel
- Captain: Barbara Daniels

Team information
- Founded: Unknown First recorded match: 1963
- Dissolved: 1999

History
- WAC wins: 1
- WCC wins: 0

The West Midlands Women's cricket team was the women's representative cricket team for the West Midlands. They competed in the Women's Area Championship from 1980 to 1996 and in the Women's County Championship from 1997 to 1999, after which they were replaced by Staffordshire. They won the Area Championship in 1982, and competed in Division One of the County Championship in their final season of existence.

== History ==
West Midlands Women played their first recorded match in 1963, which they lost to a touring Australia side by 10 wickets. West Midlands played Australia again in 1976, as well as playing New Zealand in 1984, and against various county sides. West Midlands joined the Women's Area Championship in 1980, and won the competition in 1982, beating East Anglia in the final by 5 wickets, with captain Rachael Heyhoe Flint scoring 80*. West Midlands went on to finish 4th in the 1992 tournament and as runners-up in the final tournament, in 1996. They then joined the Women's County Championship for its inaugural season, and were again runners-up in 1997. In their final season of existence, 1999, they were relegated from Division 1 and subsequently replaced by Staffordshire, who immediately regained their former team's place in Division 1, in 2000.

== Players ==
=== Notable players ===
Players who played for West Midlands and played internationally are listed below, in order of first international appearance (noted in brackets):

- (England) Rachael Heyhoe Flint (1960)
- (England) June Bragger (1963)
- (England) Carol Evans (1968)
- (England) Jill Cruwys (1969)
- (England) Rosalind Heggs (1973)
- (England) Wendy Williams (1973)
- (Australia) Valerie Farrell (1973)
- (England) Jan Brittin (1979)
- (England) Janet Tedstone (1979)
- (England) Cathy Cooke (1989)
- (England) Julie Crump (1989)
- (England) Barbara Daniels (1993)
- (England) Clare Gough (2001)

== Seasons ==
=== Women's County Championship ===
Season	Division	League standings								Notes
Season	Division	P	W	L	T	A/C	BP	Pts	Pos	Notes
1997	Division 1	5	3	2	0	0	32.5	68.5	2nd	
1998	Division 1	5	2	3	0	0	33	57	3rd	
1999	Division 1	5	0	5	0	0	28	28	5th	Relegated

== Honours ==
- Women's Area Championship:
  - Champions (1) – 1982

== See also ==
- Shropshire Women cricket team
- Staffordshire Women cricket team
- Warwickshire Women cricket team
- Worcestershire Women cricket team
- List of defunct English women's cricket teams
