= List of defunct English women's cricket teams =

The top level of women's cricket in England has undergone a number of structural changes. These changes have resulted in a number of teams becoming defunct, often being replaced by multiple teams covering smaller areas.

The teams listed below competed in either the Women's Area Championship (1980–1996) or the Women's County Championship (1997–2019). Although many of the teams listed played matches before these competitions, only the seasons in which they participated in these competitions are included in the table.

== Defunct teams ==
Team	First	Last	Ref
A Woods' XI	1990	1990	
BA Daniels' XI	1990	1990	
East Anglia	1980	2000	
East Midlands	1980	1999	
Invitation XI	1989	1989	
Lancashire and Cheshire	1980	1997	
Thames Valley	1980	1999	
West	1980	1999	
West Midlands	1980	1999	
WCA Invitation XI	1986	1986	
