= East Anglia Women cricket team =

English women's cricket team

East Anglia Women
Personnel
- Captain: Helen Chard

Team information
- Founded: Unknown First recorded match: 1954
- Dissolved: 2000

History
- WAC wins: 0
- WCC wins: 0

The East Anglia Women's cricket team was the women's representative cricket team for East Anglia. They competed in the Women's Area Championship from 1980 to 1996 and in the Women's County Championship from 1997 to 2000, after which they were replaced by Hertfordshire. They reached the final of the Women's Area Championship in 1982, and competed in Division Two of the County Championship in their final season of existence.

== History ==
East Anglia Women played their first recorded match in 1954, in which they lost to New Zealand by 8 wickets. East Anglia went on to play Australia in 1963 and New Zealand again in 1966, as well as various one-off matches against other English teams.

East Anglia joined the Women's Area Championship for its inaugural season in 1980, and reached the final in 1982, where they lost to West Midlands. East Anglia competed in every season of the Area Championship, up until 1996. They reached the semi-finals in 1994, and played in Division One when they tournament changed formats for 1995 and 1996. In 1997, they joined the Women's County Championship, and were relegated from Division 1 in their first season. In the following three seasons, they played in Division 2, finishing bottom in 2000. At this point, they were the only regional side remaining in the competition, and they were replaced by Hertfordshire ahead of the 2001 season.

== Players ==
=== Notable players ===
Players who played for East Anglia and played internationally are listed below, in order of first international appearance (noted in brackets):

- (England) Audrey Collins (1937)
- (England) Alison Ratcliffe (1960)
- (England) Megan Lear (1973)
- (England) Pamela Mather (1973)
- (England) Lynne Read (1973)
- (Cricket West Indies) Vivalyn Latty-Scott (1973)
- (England) Margaret Peear (1979)
- (England) Jacqueline Wainwright (1979)
- (England) Avril Starling (1982)
- (England) Gill McConway (1982)
- (England) Jane Powell (1984)
- (England) Elaine Wulcko (1987)
- (England) Suzie Kitson (1988)
- (England) Alison Elder (1990)
- (England) Charlotte Edwards (1996)
- (England) Lucy Pearson (1996)

== Seasons ==
=== Women's County Championship ===
Season	Division	League standings								Notes
Season	Division	P	W	L	T	A/C	BP	Pts	Pos	Notes
1997	Division 1	5	1	4	0	0	22	34	6th	Relegated
1998	Division 2	5	3	2	0	0	36	68	3rd	
1999	Division 2	5	1	4	0	0	26.5	38.5	5th	
2000	Division 2	5	1	4	0	0	21.5	33.5	6th	

== See also ==
- Cambridgeshire and Huntingdonshire Women cricket team
- Essex Women cricket team
- Hertfordshire Women cricket team
- Norfolk Women cricket team
- Suffolk Women cricket team
- List of defunct English women's cricket teams
