= 2000 Women's County Championship =

- Administrator(s): England and Wales Cricket Board
- Cricket format: 50 over
- Tournament format(s): League system
- Champions: Yorkshire (3rd title)
- Participants: 18
- Most runs: Charlotte Edwards (374)
- Most wickets: Nicky Myers (13)

The 2000 Women's County One-Day Championship was the 4th cricket Women's County Championship season. It took place in July and August and saw 14 county teams, 3 county Second XIs and 1 regional team compete in a series of divisions. Yorkshire Women won the County Championship as winners of the top division, achieving their third Championship title.

== Competition format ==
Teams played matches within a series of divisions with the winners of the top division being crowned County Champions. Matches were played using a one day format with 50 overs per side.

The championship works on a points system with positions within the divisions being based on the total points. Points were awarded as follows:

Win: 12 points.
Tie: 6 points.
Loss: Bonus points.
No Result: 11 points.
Abandoned: 11 points.

Up to five batting and five bowling points per side were also available.

== Teams ==
The 2000 Championship consisted of 18 teams, competing in three divisions of six teams apiece. Teams played each other once.

Division One	Berkshire	Kent	Nottinghamshire	Surrey	Sussex	Yorkshire
Division Two	Cheshire	East Anglia	Lancashire	Staffordshire	Somerset	Yorkshire Second XI
Division Three	Derbyshire	Hampshire	Middlesex	Northumberland	Surrey Second XI	Sussex Second XI

== Division One ==
Team	Pld	W	L	T	A	Bat	Bowl	Ded	Pts
Yorkshire (C)	5	5	0	0	0	20.5	21.5	0	102
Nottinghamshire	5	4	1	0	0	17	18.5	0	83.5
Kent	5	2	3	0	0	18.5	12.5	0	55
Berkshire	5	2	3	0	0	16	12	0	52
Surrey	5	1	4	0	0	16	15.5	0	43.5
Sussex (R)	5	1	4	0	0	13.5	16	0	41.5

Source: Cricket Archive

== Division Two ==
Team	Pld	W	L	T	A	Bat	Bowl	Ded	Pts
Staffordshire (P)	5	5	0	0	0	18	20.5	0	98.5
Lancashire	5	3	2	0	0	17	20.5	0	73.5
Somerset	5	3	2	0	0	17.5	19.5	0	73
Cheshire	5	2	3	0	0	15.5	14	0	53.5
Yorkshire Second XI	5	1	4	0	0	15.5	15.5	0	43
East Anglia (Note: Due to a restructuring of the teams competing in the Championship, involving the removal of all Second XI teams, Hertfordshire, who replaced East Anglia for the 2001 season, continued to compete in Division Two.)	5	1	4	0	0	13	8.5	0	33.5

Source: Cricket Archive

== Division Three ==
Team	Pld	W	L	T	A	Bat	Bowl	Ded	Pts
Derbyshire (P)	5	5	0	0	0	20	20	0	100
Middlesex	5	3	2	0	0	19	21	0	76
Surrey Second XI	5	3	2	0	0	15	21	0	72
Hampshire	5	3	2	0	0	15.5	18	0	69.5
Sussex Second XI	5	1	4	0	0	15	17.5	0	41.5
Northumberland	5	0	5	0	0	8	11.5	0	19.5

Source: Cricket Archive

== Statistics ==
=== Most runs ===
Player	Team	Matches	Innings	Runs	Average	HS	100s	50s
Charlotte Edwards	Kent	5	5	374	93.50	128	2	2
Jane Smit	Nottinghamshire	5	5	304	152.00	96	0	3
Melissa Reynard	Yorkshire	5	5	248	62.00	70	0	3
Arran Brindle	Lancashire	5	5	235	47.00	97	0	3
Sue Redfern	Derbyshire	4	4	218	54.50	125	1	0

Source: CricketArchive

=== Most wickets ===
Player	Team	Balls	Wickets	Average	BBI	5w
Nicky Myers	Nottinghamshire	282	13	7.46	4/4	0
Rachael Walsh	Lancashire	174	9	7.33	4/30	0
Leanne Davis	Lancashire	216	9	7.44	5/19	1
Susan Hobkinson	Surrey Second XI	282	9	9.33	3/21	0
Sharon Bayton	Surrey Second XI	200	9	9.44	4/17	0

Source: CricketArchive
