= Berkshire Women cricket team =

UK cricket team

Berkshire Women

Personnel
- Captain: Izzy Storrar
- Coach: Tom Jackson

Team information
- Founded: Unknown First recorded match: 1936
- Home ground: Various Including Summerleaze Road, Maidenhead

History
- WCC wins: 0
- T20 Cup wins: 1
- Official website: Official Website

The Berkshire Women's cricket team is the women's representative cricket team for the English historic county of Berkshire. They play their home games at various grounds across the county, including Summerleaze Road, Maidenhead and Falkland CC, Newbury, and are captained by Ashleigh Muttitt. They competed in Division One of the Women's County Championship until 2017, when they were relegated, and they won the Women's Twenty20 Cup in 2010. They are partnered with the regional side Southern Vipers.

== History ==
=== 1936–1999: Early History ===
Berkshire Women played their first recorded match in 1936, against Buckinghamshire Women, which they lost by 66 runs. When the Women's County Championship began in 1997, Thames Valley Women, which included Berkshire, competed, having also previously played in various regional competitions.

=== 2000– : Women's County Championship ===
Berkshire joined the Women's County Championship in 2000, replacing Thames Valley, and finished 4th in Division 1 in their first season. After being relegated in 2003, they did not return to Division 1 until 2008, after which they became a consistently mid-table side. This period saw much greater success in the Women's Twenty20 Cup for Berkshire, reaching the final three times in a row between 2010 and 2012, including winning the competition in 2010, beating Yorkshire by 46 runs. In 2017, Berkshire were relegated from Division 1 and have remained in Division 2 since, whilst also suffering two consecutive relegations in the T20 Cup. In 2021, they competed in the West Midlands Group of the Twenty20 Cup, but finished bottom with 4 losses and 4 abandoned matches. In 2022 and 2023, they finished third in their group of the Twenty20 Cup. They also joined the South Central Counties Cup in 2022, finishing third out of six teams in the inaugural edition. In 2024, the side finished 5th in their group in the Twenty20 Cup and 3rd in their group in the new ECB Women's County One-Day tournament.

== Players ==
=== Current squad ===
Based on appearances in the 2023 season.‡ denotes players with international caps.

Name	Nationality	Birth date	Batting style	Bowling style	Notes
Batters
Abigail Avery	England	Unknown	Unknown	Unknown	
Lauren Avery	England	Unknown	Unknown	Unknown	
Izzy Storrar	England	Unknown	Unknown	Unknown	
All-rounders
Heather Knight ‡	England	26 December 1990 (age 35)	Right-handed	Right-arm off break	
Ava Lee	England	26 August 2005 (age 20)	Right-handed	Right-arm off break	
Alice Macleod	England	14 May 1994 (age 32)	Right-handed	Right-arm off break	
Ashleigh Muttitt	England	21 February 1999 (age 27)	Right-handed	Right-arm medium	Club captain
Shristi Patil	England	Unknown	Unknown	Unknown	
Amanda Potgieter	South Africa	4 April 1978 (age 48)	Right-handed	Right-arm medium	
Holly Rider	England	5 May 2006 (age 20)	Right-handed	Right-arm medium	
Poppy Tulloch	England	Unknown	Unknown	Unknown	
Wicket-keepers
Ariana Dowse	England	8 February 2001 (age 25)	Right-handed	—	
Olivia Gain	New Zealand	2 January 2002 (age 24)	Right-handed	—	Overseas player
Mia Rogers	England	29 January 2002 (age 24)	Right-handed	—	
Bowlers
Laura Bailey	England	Unknown	Right-handed	Right-arm leg break	Dual-registration with Surrey
Lauren Bell ‡	England	21 January 2001 (age 25)	Right-handed	Right-arm medium	
Mary Briscoe	England	Unknown	Unknown	Unknown	
Molly Bulteel	England	6 August 2007 (age 18)	Unknown	Right-arm medium	
Shayna Chikhlia	England	Unknown	Unknown	Unknown	
Francesca Clarke	England	Unknown	Unknown	Unknown	
Kali-Ann Docherty	England	Unknown	Unknown	Unknown	
Freya Johnson	England	25 October 2001 (age 24)	Right-handed	Right-arm medium	
Hollie Summerfield	England	Unknown	Unknown	Right-arm off break	

=== Notable players ===
Players who have played for Berkshire and played internationally are listed below, in order of first international appearance (given in brackets):

- (England) Debra Stock (1992)
- (England) Claire Taylor (1998)
- (England) Isa Guha (2001)
- (Australia) Alex Blackwell (2003)
- (New Zealand) Rachel Priest (2007)
- (England) Anya Shrubsole (2008)
- (New Zealand) Victoria Lind (2009)
- (England) Heather Knight (2010)
- (England) Jodie Cook (2014)
- (England) Linsey Smith (2018)
- (Scotland) Ellen Watson (2019)
- (England) Lauren Bell (2022)

== Seasons ==
=== Women's County Championship ===
Season	Division	League standings								Notes
Season	Division	P	W	L	T	A/C	BP	Pts	Pos	Notes
2000	Division 1	5	2	3	0	0	28	52	4th	
2001	Division 1	5	3	2	0	0	39	75	2nd	
2002	Division 1	5	2	1	0	0	24.5	70.5	2nd	
2003	Division 1	5	0	5	0	0	32	32	6th	Relegated
2004	Division 2	5	4	1	0	0	40.5	88.5	2nd	
2005	Division 2	6	3	2	0	1	30	77	3rd	
2006	Division 2	6	2	2	0	2	15	63	3rd	
2007	Division 2	6	4	1	0	1	2	112	1st	Promoted
2008	Division 1	6	0	6	0	0	16	16	4th	
2009	Division 1	10	2	8	0	0	30	70	5th	
2010	Division 1	10	6	4	0	0	49	109	3rd	
2011	Division 1	10	2	6	0	2	35	55	5th	
2012	Division 1	8	1	2	0	5	17	27	5th	
2013	Division 1	8	4	4	0	0	44	84	5th	
2014	Division 1	8	3	2	0	3	46	96	3rd	
2015	Division 1	8	4	2	0	2	40	80	4th	
2016	Division 1	8	3	4	0	1	47	77	5th	
2017	Division 1	7	0	7	0	0	23	23	8th	Relegated
2018	Division 2	7	3	3	0	1	27	57	5th	
2019	Division 2	7	5	1	0	1	43	98	2nd	

=== Women's Twenty20 Cup ===
Season	Division	League standings								Notes
Season	Division	P	W	L	T	A/C	NRR	Pts	Pos	Notes
2009	Division 1	3	0	1	0	2	–0.40	2	3rd	
2010	Division S&W 1	3	3	0	0	0	+2.30	6	1st	Champions
2011	Division S&W 1	3	3	0	0	0	+2.16	6	1st	Runners-up
2012	Division S&W 1	3	3	0	0	0	+2.56	6	1st	Runners-up
2013	Division S&W 1	3	2	1	0	0	+2.22	8	2nd	Won group final; lost semi-final
2014	Division 1A	4	0	4	0	0	–0.53	0	7th	
2015	Division 1	8	3	5	0	0	–0.34	12	7th	
2016	Division 1	7	3	4	0	0	–0.06	12	4th	
2017	Division 1	8	1	5	0	2	–2.94	6	9th	Relegated
2018	Division 2	8	2	6	0	0	–0.74	8	7th	Relegated
2019	Division 3A	8	7	1	0	0	+2.47	8	1st	
2021	West Midlands	8	0	4	0	4	–2.75	4	6th	
2022	Group 2	6	3	3	0	0	–0.28	12	3rd	
2023	Group 5	6	1	1	0	4	–1.53	8	3rd	
2024	Group 3	8	3	4	0	1	–0.32	61	5th	

=== ECB Women's County One-Day ===
Season	Group	League standings								Notes
Season	Group	P	W	L	T	A/C	BP	Pts	Pos	Notes
2024	Group 2	4	3	1	0	0	3	15	3rd	

== Honours ==
- County Championship:
  - Division Two champions (1) – 2007
- Twenty20 Cup
  - Champions (1) – 2010
  - Division 3A champions (1) – 2009

== See also ==
- Berkshire County Cricket Club
- Southern Vipers
