= Staffordshire Women cricket team =

English county cricket team

Staffordshire Women

Personnel
- Captain: Stephanie Butler

Team information
- Founded: Unknown First recorded match: 2000
- Home ground: Various

History
- WCC wins: 0
- T20 Cup wins: 0
- Official website: Staffordshire Cricket

The Staffordshire Women's cricket team is the women's representative cricket team for the English historic county of Staffordshire. They play their home games at various grounds across the county, including Tunstall Road, Knypersley and are captained by Stephanie Butler. In 2019, they played in Division Three of the final season of the Women's County Championship, and have since competed in the Women's Twenty20 Cup. They are partnered with the West Midlands regional side Central Sparks.

== History ==
Staffordshire Women joined the Women's County Championship in 2000, replacing West Midlands Women, and won Division 2 in their first season, going unbeaten and gaining promotion. Staffordshire were relegated two seasons later, and reached as low as Division Four in 2008. They also joined the Women's Twenty20 Cup in 2009, winning two promotions when the tournament was regionalised, and since playing in Division Two and Three. In 2021, they competed in the West Midlands Group of the Twenty20 Cup, finishing 5th. They finished second in their group of the 2022 Women's Twenty20 Cup, before losing in the group final to Worcestershire. Staffordshire batter Davina Perrin was the fourth-highest run-scorer in the competition, with 242 runs. They again reached the group final of the 2023 Women's Twenty20 Cup, but lost to Warwickshire.

Meanwhile, in the Championship, Staffordshire began their progression back up through the Divisions, winning promotion from Division Three in 2011, and from Division Two in 2015, with batter Evelyn Jones ending the 2015 season as leading run-scorer in the division. Their stay in Division 1 was short-lived, however, as they were relegated in 2016, and suffered a second consecutive relegation the following season. In the final two years of the Championship, Staffordshire played in Division 3, but did win their group in 2019.

They have also competed in the West Midlands Regional Cup since 2022, finishing fourth out of four teams in the first season of the competition. They reached the final of the 2023 edition after topping the group stage, but lost in the final to Worcestershire. In 2024, the side finished 4th in their group in the Twenty20 Cup and 2nd in their group in the new ECB Women's County One-Day tournament.

England batter Danni Wyatt made her international debut whilst playing for Staffordshire, and the county is also the original team of England all-rounder Georgia Elwiss.

== Players ==
=== Current squad ===
Based on appearances in the 2023 season. ‡ denotes players with international caps.

Name	Nationality	2023 Appearances		Notes
Name	Nationality	WT20	WMRC	Notes
Stephanie Butler	England	2	4	Club captain
Matilda Atherton-Gater	England	0	1	
Meg Austin	England	1	3	
Sophie Beech	England	2	3	
Lexie Cantrill	England	2	4	
Poppy Davies	England	0	2	Wicket-keeper
Isabel Ellsmore	England	2	0	
Abigail Freeborn	England	2	0	Wicket-keeper
Christina Gough ‡	Germany	0	2	
Georgie Harrison	England	0	4	
Helen Hughes	England	0	4	
Megan Jones	England	0	2	
Amelia Lee	England	2	4	
Ruby Millington	England	0	1	Wicket-keeper
Davina Perrin	England	2	0	
Lydia Perry	England	2	4	
Grace Potts	England	0	0	
Lucy Shenton	England	2	4	
Ilenia Sims ‡	Italy	0	1	
Mia Smith	England	0	1	
Ebony Tweats	England	2	3	
Amy Wheeler	England	2	4	

=== Notable players ===
Players who have played for Staffordshire and played internationally are listed below, in order of first international appearance (given in brackets):

- (England) Julie Crump (1989)
- (England) Barbara Daniels (1993)
- (England) Sue Redfern (1995)
- (New Zealand) Anna Smith (1996)
- (England) Lucy Pearson (1996)
- (England) Laura Newton (1997)
- (England) Clare Gough (2001)
- (South Africa) Lonell de Beer (2005)
- (New Zealand) Rachel Priest (2007)
- (Cricket West Indies) Shanel Daley (2008)
- (Australia) Elyse Villani (2009)
- (New Zealand) Kate Ebrahim (2010)
- (England) Danni Wyatt (2010)
- (England) Georgia Elwiss (2011)
- (Australia) Molly Strano (2017)
- (Italy) Ilenia Sims (2024)
- (Italy) Luana Sims (2024)

== Seasons ==
=== Women's County Championship ===
Season	Division	League standings								Notes
Season	Division	P	W	L	T	A/C	BP	Pts	Pos	Notes
2000	Division 2	5	5	0	0	0	38.5	98.5	1st	Promoted
2001	Division 1	5	3	2	0	0	35	71	3rd	
2002	Division 1	5	0	3	0	2	18	40	6th	Relegated
2003	Division 2	5	3	1	0	1	27.5	74.5	3rd	
2004	Division 2	5	3	2	0	0	36.5	72.5	3rd	
2005	Division 3	6	2	3	0	1	31.5	66.5	3rd	
2006	Division 3	6	3	1	0	2	7	75	2nd	
2007	Division 3	6	1	3	0	2	6	51	4th	Relegated
2008	Division 4	6	4	2	0	0	2	82	2nd	
2009	Division 3	10	6	1	0	3	0	135	3rd	
2010	Division 3	10	6	3	0	1	58	118	2nd	
2011	Division 3	9	7	1	0	1	46	116	2nd	Promoted
2012	Division 2	8	2	3	0	3	25	45	6th	
2013	Division 2	8	4	4	0	0	38	78	5th	
2014	Division 2	8	5	3	0	0	46	96	4th	
2015	Division 2	8	5	1	0	2	43	93	2nd	Promoted
2016	Division 1	8	1	4	0	3	20	30	9th	Relegated
2017	Division 2	7	0	7	0	0	24	24	8th	Relegated
2018	Division 3E	6	3	2	0	1	37	67	2nd	
2019	Division 3A	6	6	0	0	0	46	106	1st	

=== Women's Twenty20 Cup ===
Season	Division	League standings								Notes
Season	Division	P	W	L	T	A/C	NRR	Pts	Pos	Notes
2009	Division 4	3	2	1	0	0	+0.47	4	2nd	
2010	Division M&N 2	3	2	0	0	1	+1.96	5	1st	Promoted
2011	Division M&N 1	3	1	2	0	0	−2.75	2	3rd	Relegated
2012	Division M&N 2	3	3	0	0	0	+5.74	6	1st	Promoted
2013	Division M&N 1	3	0	3	0	0	−1.76	0	4th	
2014	Division 2A	4	3	1	0	0	+1.60	12	3rd	
2015	Division 2	8	4	4	0	0	−0.22	16	5th	
2016	Division 2	7	2	4	0	1	−0.44	9	7th	
2017	Division 2	8	2	4	0	2	−0.83	10	8th	Relegated
2018	Division 3B	8	6	2	0	0	+2.51	24	2nd	
2019	Division 3C	8	6	0	0	2	+2.45	26	1st	
2021	West Midlands	8	0	2	0	6	–1.10	6	5th	
2022	Group 2	6	4	2	0	0	+0.330	16	2nd	Lost final
2023	Group 2	6	0	0	0	6	+0.00	6	2nd	Lost final
2024	Group 1	7	2	5	0	0	–0.80	61	4th	

=== ECB Women's County One-Day ===
Season	Group	League standings								Notes
Season	Group	P	W	L	T	A/C	BP	Pts	Pos	Notes
2024	Group 1	4	3	1	0	0	2	14	2nd	

== See also ==
- Staffordshire County Cricket Club
- Central Sparks
