= Jane Gough =

English cricketer

Personal information
- Full name: Jane Mary Gough
- Born: 4 September 1943 (age 83); Twickenham, Middlesex, England
- Batting: Right-handed
- Bowling: Right-arm slow
- Role: Batter

International information
- National side: England (1973)
- Only ODI (cap 14): 18 July 1973 v Young England

Domestic team information
- Years: Team
- 1971–1991: West

Career statistics
Competition	WODI	WFC	WLA
Matches	1	2	18
Runs scored	33	1	396
Batting average	33.00	0.50	24.75
100s/50s	0/0	0/0	0/4
Top score	33	1	69
Catches/stumpings	0/–	0/–	2/–
- Source: CricketArchive, 13 March 2021

Jane Mary Gough (born 4 September 1943) is an English former cricketer who played as a right-handed batter. She appeared in one One Day International for England, against Young England in the 1973 Women's Cricket World Cup. She scored 33 before being run out. She played domestic cricket for West of England.
