= West Women cricket team =

English women's cricket team

West Women
Personnel
- Captain: Coral Handley

Team information
- Founded: Unknown First recorded match: 1930
- Dissolved: 1999

History
- WAC wins: 0
- WCC wins: 0

The West Women's cricket team, also known as West of England Women and Western Counties Women, was the women's representative cricket team for South West England. They competed in the Women's Area Championship from 1980 to 1996 and in the Women's County Championship from 1997 to 1999, after which they were replaced by Somerset. They were runners-up in the Area Championship in 1986, and competed in Division Two of the Championship in their final season of existence.

== History ==
West Women played their first recorded match in 1930, in which they drew against Midlands Women. West Women went on to play various games against other regional sides, as well as against touring sides such as Australia and New Zealand. West Women joined the Women's Area Championship in 1980, reaching the semi-finals in 1981 and the final in 1986 (which they lost to Kent). They joined the Women's County Championship in 1997, finishing 4th in Division 1 in their first season. They were relegated the following season, and finished second in Division Two in 1999, after which the team was disbanded and replaced by Somerset.

== Players ==
=== Notable players ===
Players who played for West Women and played internationally are listed below, in order of first international appearance (noted in brackets):

- (England) Betty Snowball (1934)
- (England) Mary Spear (1934)
- (England) Mary Richards (1935)
- (England) Mary Duggan (1949)
- (England) Cecilia Robinson (1949)
- (England) Margaret Lockwood (1951)
- (England) Barbara Murrey (1951)
- (England) Kay Green (1954)
- (England) Audrey Disbury (1957)
- (England) Rachael Heyhoe Flint (1960)
- (England) Carol Evans (1968)
- (Australia) Anne Gordon (1968)
- (England) Jill Cruwys (1969)
- (England) Rosalind Heggs (1973)
- (Australia) Valerie Farrell (1973)
- (England) Shirley Ellis (1973)
- (England) Jane Gough (1973)
- (England) Sarah Potter (1984)
- (England) Janet Godman (1991)
- (England) Barbara Daniels (1993)
- (England) Laura Harper (1999)
- (England) Jackie Hawker (1999)
- (England) Hannah Lloyd (1999)

== Seasons ==
=== Women's County Championship ===
| Season | Division | League standings | | | | | | | | Notes |
| Season | Division | P | W | L | T | A/C | BP | Pts | Pos | Notes |
|---|---|---|---|---|---|---|---|---|---|---|
| 1997 | Division 1 | 5 | 2 | 3 | 0 | 0 | 29 | 53 | 4th | |
| 1998 | Division 1 | 5 | 0 | 5 | 0 | 0 | 33.5 | 33.5 | 5th | Relegated |
| 1999 | Division 2 | 5 | 4 | 1 | 0 | 0 | 38 | 86 | 2nd | |

== See also ==
- Cornwall Women cricket team
- Devon Women cricket team
- Dorset Women cricket team
- Gloucestershire Women cricket team
- Somerset Women cricket team
- List of defunct English women's cricket teams
