= 2005 Women's County Championship =

- Administrator(s): England and Wales Cricket Board
- Cricket format: 50 over
- Tournament format(s): League system
- Champions: Sussex (3rd title)
- Participants: 28
- Most runs: Charlotte Edwards (302)
- Most wickets: Judith Turner (10); Dawn Prestidge (10)

The 2005 Women's County One-Day Championship was the 9th cricket Women's County Championship season. It ran from May to August and saw 27 county teams plus Wales compete in a series of divisions. Sussex Women won the County Championship as winners of the top division, their third title in three years.

== Competition format ==
Teams played matches within a series of divisions with the winners of the top division being crowned County Champions. Matches were played using a one day format with 50 overs per side.

The championship works on a points system with positions within the divisions being based on the total points. Points were awarded as follows:

Win: 12 points.
Tie: 6 points.
Loss: Bonus points.
No Result: 11 points.
Abandoned: 11 points.

Up to five batting and five bowling points per side were also available.

== Teams ==
The 2005 Championship was divided into two tiers: the County Championship and the County Challenge Cup. The County Championship consisted of three divisions of four teams, whilst the Challenge Cup consisted of four groups of four teams, on equal standing, with the winners proceeding to a play-off round for promotion to the County Championship.

Teams in the County Championship played each other twice, whilst teams in the Challenge Cup played each other once.

=== County Championship ===
Division One	Kent	Lancashire	Sussex	Yorkshire
Division Two	Berkshire	Nottinghamshire	Somerset	Surrey
Division Three	Cheshire	Hampshire	Middlesex	Staffordshire

=== County Challenge Cup ===
Group 1	Cumbria	Derbyshire	Durham	Northumberland
Group 2	Essex	Hertfordshire	Leicestershire	Norfolk
Group 3	Northamptonshire	Wales	Warwickshire	Worcestershire
Group 4	Cornwall	Devon	Dorset	Wiltshire

== County Championship ==
=== Division One ===
Team	Pld	W	L	T	A	Bat	Bowl	Ded	Pts
Sussex (C)	6	3	1	0	2	16	14	0	88
Kent	6	3	2	0	1	19	17	0	83
Lancashire	6	2	3	0	1	17.5	22.5	0	75
Yorkshire (R)	6	1	3	0	2	10.5	14	0	58.5

Source: ECB Women's County Championship

=== Division Two ===
Team	Pld	W	L	T	A	Bat	Bowl	Ded	Pts
Somerset (P)	6	4	1	0	1	21.5	21	0	101.5
Nottinghamshire	6	3	2	0	1	17.5	20	0	84.5
Berkshire	6	3	2	0	1	14	16	0	77
Surrey (R)	6	0	5	0	1	13.5	8.5	0	33

Source: ECB Women's County Championship

=== Division Three ===
Team	Pld	W	L	T	A	Bat	Bowl	Ded	Pts
Cheshire (P)	6	4	1	0	1	17.5	21	0	97.5
Middlesex	6	2	3	0	1	18	18.5	0	71.5
Staffordshire	6	2	3	0	1	12.5	19	0	66.5
Hampshire (R)	6	2	3	0	1	14.5	16	0	65.5

Source: ECB Women's County Championship

== County Challenge Cup ==
=== Group 1 ===
Team	Pld	W	L	T	A	Bat	Bowl	Ded	Pts
Derbyshire (PO)	3	3	0	0	0	13	15	0	64
Durham	3	2	1	0	0	12.5	11	0	47.5
Northumberland	2	0	2	0	0	4	3.5	0	7.5
Cumbria	2	0	2	0	0	3.5	3	0	6.5

Source: ECB Women's County Championship

=== Group 2 ===
Team	Pld	W	L	T	A	Bat	Bowl	Ded	Pts
Hertfordshire (PO)	3	2	1	0	0	12.5	12	0	48.5
Norfolk	3	2	1	0	0	12	12	0	48
Essex	3	1	2	0	0	13	12.5	0	37.5
Leicestershire	3	1	2	0	0	7	7	0	26

Source: ECB Women's County Championship

=== Group 3 ===
Team	Pld	W	L	T	A	Bat	Bowl	Ded	Pts
Northamptonshire (PO)	3	2	0	0	1	8	8.5	0	51.5
Warwickshire	3	1	2	0	0	8	9.5	0	29.5
Wales	2	1	1	0	0	5	9	0	26
Worcestershire	2	0	1	0	1	1.5	3.5	0	16

Source: ECB Women's County Championship

=== Group 4 ===
Team	Pld	W	L	T	A	Bat	Bowl	Ded	Pts
Dorset (PO)	3	2	1	0	0	11	15	0	50
Devon	3	2	1	0	0	11.5	11	0	46.5
Wiltshire	3	1	2	0	0	5.5	11.5	0	29
Cornwall	3	1	2	0	0	6	10	0	28

Source: ECB Women's County Championship

=== Play-off ===
Team	Pld	W	L	T	A	Bat	Bowl	Ded	Pts
Northamptonshire (P)	3	3	0	0	0	11.5	13	0	60.5
Derbyshire	3	2	1	0	0	11.5	12.5	0	48
Dorset	3	1	2	0	0	8	6.5	0	26.5
Hertfordshire	3	0	3	0	0	8.5	4.5	0	13

Source: ECB Women's County Championship

== Statistics ==
=== Most runs ===
Player	Team	Matches	Innings	Runs	Average	HS	100s	50s
Charlotte Edwards	Kent	5	5	302	75.50	135*	1	2
Laura Newton	Lancashire	5	5	239	59.75	162*	1	1
Hannah Lloyd	Somerset	5	5	222	55.50	136*	1	0
Jenny Dunn	Cheshire	5	5	198	49.50	82*	0	1
Janice Fraser	Middlesex	5	5	195	48.75	101*	1	0

Source: CricketArchive

=== Most wickets ===
Player	Team	Balls	Wickets	Average	BBI	5w
Judith Turner	Berkshire	126	10	6.60	4/4	0
Dawn Prestidge	Cheshire	259	10	12.80	5/20	1
Marsha Davies	Kent	229	9	9.88	4/13	0
Nicky Myers	Nottinghamshire	300	9	12.00	3/10	0
Steph Davies	Somerset	256	9	12.22	4/17	0

Source: CricketArchive
