= Derbyshire Women cricket team =

UK cricket team

Derbyshire Women

Personnel
- Captain: Adrianna Darlow
- Coach: Richard Wood

Team information
- Founded: Unknown First recorded match: 1997
- Home ground: Various Including Dovecliff Road, Rolleston on Dove

History
- WCC wins: 0
- T20 Cup wins: 1
- Official website: Derbyshire Cricket

The Derbyshire Women's cricket team is the women's representative cricket team for the English historic county of Derbyshire. They play their home games at various grounds across the county, and are captained by Adrianna Darlow. In 2019, they competed in Division 3 of the final season of the Women's County Championship, and have since competed in the Women's Twenty20 Cup, which they won in 2024. They were formerly partnered with the regional side The Blaze.

== History ==
=== Women's County Championship ===
Derbyshire Women joined the Women's County Championship for its inaugural season in 1997, in which they won Division 3 and were promoted. They played in Division 2 for two seasons, before being relegated in 1999; however, they bounced straight back and were promoted the following season, winning five out of five games. After being relegated again in 2002, Derbyshire ended up in the County Challenge Cup in 2004, the competition a tier below the County Championship. Derbyshire performed well here, just missing out on promotion in 2005 and 2006 before finally achieving it in 2007. Over the next 10 years, Derbyshire remained in the lowest division of the County Championship, before being promoted in 2016 to Division Two, finishing just three points ahead of Durham. They were relegated two seasons later, in 2018, before finishing 2nd in Division 3A in the final season of the Championship, 2019.

=== Women's Twenty20 Cup ===
Derbyshire also played in the inaugural season of the Women's Twenty20 Cup, 2009, finishing bottom of Division 3. Similarly to their Championship performance, Derbyshire consistently bounced between the divisions, for example being promoted in 2014, 2016 and 2018 and being relegated in 2015 and 2017. In 2021, they competed in the East Midlands Group of the Twenty20 Cup, and finished 4th with 2 victories. In 2022, they finished 3rd in Group 1 of the Twenty20 Cup. In the 2023 Women's Twenty20 Cup, the side reached the group semi-final, where they lost to Scotland. In 2024, the side won the Twenty20 Cup, topping their group before winning all three matches at the National Finals.

== Players ==
=== Current squad ===
Based on appearances in the 2023 season.‡ denotes players with international caps.

Name	Nationality	Apps	Notes			
Name	Nationality	Apps	Notes	Natasha Allen	England	1
Maria Andrews	England	1				
Adrianna Darlow	England	1	; Captain & Club-Captain			
Lara Shaw	England	1				
Emma Thatcher	England	1				
Liv Baker	England		Loan from The Blaze			
Jess Couser						
Prisha Bedi						
Francesca Clarke						
Rhiannon Knowling-Davies	England					
Matilda Gater						
Emily Hughes			Loan from The Blaze Academy			
Lauren Kenvyn			Loan from Warwickshire Academy			
Aamna Khan						
Frances Lonsdale						
Ella Porter	England					
Sophia McCollum	England		On loan at Staffordshire (2026)			
Gemma Rose	England					
Caitlin McDonald						
Beth Slater						
Ellie Nightingale			Loan from Yorkshire			
Malisha Tennakoon			Loan from Warwickshire			
Harriet Parkin			On loan at Lincolnshire (2026)			

=== Notable players ===
Players who have played for Derbyshire and played internationally are listed below, in order of first international appearance (given in brackets):

- (England) Wendy Watson (1987)
- (England) Sue Redfern (1995)
- (Scotland) Kathryn Bryce (2018)
- (England) Sarah Glenn (2019)
- (England) Bess Heath (2023)

== Seasons ==
=== Women's County Championship ===
Season	Division	League standings								Notes
Season	Division	P	W	L	T	A/C	BP	Pts	Pos	Notes
1997	Division 3	3	3	0	0	0	21.5	57.5	1st	Promoted
1998	Division 2	5	1	4	0	0	32.5	44.5	5th	
1999	Division 2	5	0	5	0	0	24	24	6th	Relegated
2000	Division 3	5	5	0	0	0	40	100	1st	Promoted
2001	Division 2	5	2	3	0	0	31.5	55.5	4th	
2002	Division 2	5	0	3	0	2	18	40	6th	Relegated
2003	Division 3	5	3	1	1	0	38.5	80.5	2nd	
2004	County Challenge Cup G1	2	1	1	0	0	14	26	3rd	
2005	County Challenge Cup G1	3	3	0	0	0	18	64	1st	Lost promotion playoff
2006	County Challenge Cup G1	3	3	0	0	0	0	60	1st	Lost promotion playoff
2007	County Challenge Cup Div A	6	3	0	0	3	0	105	1st	Promoted
2008	Division 3	6	1	4	0	1	12	38	4th	
2009	Division 3	10	1	8	0	1	22	47	6th	Relegated
2010	Division 4	9	6	3	0	0	54	114	2nd	
2011	Division 4	10	3	5	0	2	50	79	5th	
2012	Division 3	8	1	2	0	5	20	30	5th	
2013	Division 3	8	3	5	0	0	40	70	6th	
2014	Division 3	8	4	3	1	0	53	98	4th	
2015	Division 3	8	4	3	0	1	41	81	3rd	
2016	Division 3	8	6	0	0	2	45	105	1st	Promoted
2017	Division 2	7	3	4	0	0	41	71	6th	
2018	Division 2	7	2	5	0	0	34	54	7th	Relegated
2019	Division 3A	6	5	1	0	0	32	90	2nd	

=== Women's Twenty20 Cup ===
Season	Division	League standings								Notes
Season	Division	P	W	L	T	A/C	NRR	Pts	Pos	Notes
2009	Division 3	3	0	2	0	1	−1.23	1	4th	
2011	Division M&N 4	3	1	2	0	0	+0.48	2	3rd	
2012	Division M&N 4	3	2	1	0	0	+0.83	4	2nd	Lost promotion play-off
2013	Division M&N 4	3	3	0	0	0	+1.69	6	1st	
2014	Division 3C	4	3	1	0	0	+0.56	12	1st	Promoted
2015	Division 2	8	1	6	0	1	−1.38	5	9th	Relegated
2016	Division 3	8	7	1	0	0	+0.89	28	2nd	Promoted
2017	Division 2	8	3	5	0	0	−0.83	12	7th	Relegated
2018	Division 3B	8	7	1	0	0	+1.62	28	1st	Promoted
2019	Division 2	8	0	6	0	2	−1.42	2	9th	
2021	East Midlands	8	2	3	0	3	+0.07	11	4th	
2022	Group 1	6	3	3	0	0	+0.10	12	3rd	
2023	Group 1	6	0	0	0	6	+0.00	6	3rd	
2024	Group 1	7	6	1	0	0	+2.40	105	1st	Champions

=== ECB Women's County One-Day ===
Season	Group	League standings								Notes
Season	Group	P	W	L	T	A/C	BP	Pts	Pos	Notes
2024	Group 1	4	3	1	0	0	1	13	3rd	

== Honours ==
- Women's Twenty20 Cup:
  - Champions (1) – 2024

== See also ==
- Derbyshire County Cricket Club
- The Blaze (women's cricket)
