= 2002 Women's County Championship =

- Administrator(s): England and Wales Cricket Board
- Cricket format: 50 over
- Tournament format(s): League system
- Champions: Yorkshire (5th title)
- Participants: 21
- Most runs: Charlotte Edwards (233)
- Most wickets: Vicky Boorman (14)

The 2002 Women's County One-Day Championship was the 6th cricket Women's County Championship season. It took place in July and saw 21 county teams compete in a series of divisions. Yorkshire Women won the County Championship as winners of the top division, achieving their fifth Championship title in six seasons.

== Competition format ==
Teams played matches within a series of divisions, with the winners of the top division being crowned County Champions. Matches were played using a one-day format with 50 overs per side.

The championship works on a points system with positions within the divisions being based on the total points. Points were awarded as follows:

Win: 12 points.
Tie: 6 points.
Loss: Bonus points.
No Result: 11 points.
Abandoned: 11 points.

Up to five batting and five bowling points per side were also available.

== Teams ==
The 2002 Championship consisted of three divisions of six teams apiece, with teams playing each other once. The Emerging Counties competition was also competed in 2002: a tier below the County Championship, consisting of three teams, playing each other once.

Division One	Berkshire	Nottinghamshire	Staffordshire	Surrey	Sussex	Yorkshire
Division Two	Derbyshire	Hertfordshire	Kent	Lancashire	Middlesex	Somerset
Division Three	Cheshire	Durham	Essex	Hampshire	Warwickshire	Wiltshire
Emerging Counties	Cumbria	Norfolk	Northamptonshire			

== County Championship ==
=== Division One ===
Team	Pld	W	L	T	A	Bat	Bowl	Ded	Pts
Yorkshire (C)	5	3	0	0	2	10	13.5	0	81.5
Berkshire	5	2	1	0	2	9.5	15	0	70.5
Sussex	5	2	1	0	2	8	13	0	67
Nottinghamshire	5	1	2	0	2	9	11	0	54
Surrey	5	1	2	0	2	8.5	6.5	0	49
Staffordshire (R)	5	0	3	0	2	8.5	9.5	0	40

Source: ECB Women's County Championship

=== Division Two ===
Team	Pld	W	L	T	A	Bat	Bowl	Ded	Pts
Kent (P)	5	3	0	0	2	14	14.5	0	86.5
Lancashire	5	3	0	0	2	9.5	13	0	80.5
Hertfordshire	5	2	1	0	2	7.5	14.5	0	68
Somerset	5	1	2	0	2	9.5	8.5	0	52
Middlesex	5	0	3	0	2	8.5	11.5	0	42
Derbyshire (R)	5	0	3	0	2	7.5	10.5	0	40

Source: ECB Women's County Championship

=== Division Three ===
Team	Pld	W	L	T	A	Bat	Bowl	Ded	Pts
Hampshire (P)	5	3	0	0	2	11	13.5	0	82.5
Warwickshire	5	2	1	0	2	10.5	12	0	68.5
Cheshire	5	2	1	0	2	9	12	0	67
Essex	5	1	2	0	2	9.5	12	0	55.5
Durham	5	1	2	0	2	8.5	11.5	0	54
Wiltshire (R)	5	0	3	0	2	6.5	7.5	0	36

Source: ECB Women's County Championship

== Emerging Counties ==
Team	Pld	W	L	T	A	Bat	Bowl	Ded	Pts
Northamptonshire (P)	2	2	0	0	0	8.5	9	0	41.5
Norfolk	2	1	1	0	0	8.5	9	0	29.5
Cumbria	2	0	2	0	0	8	4.5	0	12.5

Source: ECB Women's County Championship

== Statistics ==
=== Most runs ===
Player	Team	Matches	Innings	Runs	Average	HS	100s	50s
Charlotte Edwards	Kent	3	3	233	116.50	151*	1	1
Paula Flannery	Kent	3	3	230	76.66	118	2	0
Claire Taylor	Berkshire	4	3	173	86.50	78	1	0
Olivia Magno	Surrey	4	3	172	57.33	108	1	0
Alexis Mannion	Essex	4	3	150	150.00	57*	0	2

Source: CricketArchive

=== Most wickets ===
Player	Team	Balls	Wickets	Average	BBI	5w
Vicky Boorman	Hertfordshire	176	14	5.07	6/16	2
Judith Turner	Berkshire	169	13	9.76	6/39	1
Clare Connor	Sussex	174	9	6.44	5/15	1
Marsha Davies	Kent	192	9	8.66	6/22	1
Yvonne Craven	Berkshire	180	8	3.37	3/6	0

Source: CricketArchive
