= Terri Bennett =

Irish cricketer

Personal information
- Full name: Terri Bennett
- Role: All-rounder

International information
- National side: Ireland (1990)
- ODI debut (cap 21): 20 July 1990 v England
- Last ODI: 16 August 1990 v England

Domestic team information
- Years: Team
- 1985–1990: East Midlands

Career statistics
Competition	WODI	WLA
Matches	3	25
Runs scored	23	167
Batting average	11.50	18.55
100s/50s	0/0	0/0
Top score	12*	29
Balls bowled	36	499
Wickets	0	19
Bowling average	–	15.21
5 wickets in innings	0	0
10 wickets in match	0	0
Best bowling	–	4/14
Catches/stumpings	0/–	2/–
- Source: CricketArchive, 20 April 2022

Terri Bennett is an Irish former cricketer who played as an all-rounder. She appeared in three One Day Internationals for Ireland in 1990. She played domestic cricket for East Midlands.
