= Hampshire Women cricket team =

UK cricket team

Hampshire Women
- One Day name: Hampshire
- Twenty20 name: Hampshire Hawks

Personnel
- Captain: Georgia Adams
- Coach: Paul Prichard
- Overseas player: TBA

Team information
- Founded: Unknown First recorded match: 1811 Reformed: 2024
- Home ground: Various

History
- WCC wins: 1
- T20 Cup wins: 0
- Official website: Hampshire Women
One-day
T20

The Hampshire Women's cricket team is the women's representative cricket team for the English historic county of Hampshire, and was a replacement for regional team Southern Vipers. They play their home games at various grounds across the county, including the Rose Bowl, Arundel Castle Cricket Ground, and Falkland CC. They are captained by Georgia Adams. They currently play in the Women's One-Day Cup and the Women's T20 Blast

== History ==
=== 1811–1996: Early History ===
Hampshire Women played their first recorded match in 1811, against Surrey Women. They then went on to play various one-off matches against neighbouring counties, sometimes as a combined team with Dorset. They played against a touring Australia side in 1937 and 1957.

=== 1997– : Women's County Championship ===
Hampshire Women joined the Women's County Championship for its inaugural season in 1997, finishing 3rd in Division 3. Over the following seasons, Hampshire remained in the lower divisions of the Championship: they were promoted to Division Two in 2002, but only remained there for two seasons, and reached as low as Division Four in 2008 and 2011. However, 2015 saw a sharp change in Hampshire's fortunes as they won Division 3 with six wins out of eight games, and then two seasons later were promoted to Division 1, topping Division Two in 2017. Hampshire then won Division One at their first attempt, in 2018, winning six of their seven matches. Hampshire's remarkable rise was helped by England captain Charlotte Edwards, who played for the club in 2017 and 2018, and overseas player Suzie Bates, who was the Division's leading run-scorer in their Championship-winning season.

Hampshire Women also had a similar rise in the Women's Twenty20 Cup. After playing in the lower regional divisions in the early years of the tournament, they gained promotion from Division 3 in 2015 and from Division 2 in 2018, topping the league with 7 wins from 8 games. Hampshire bowler Providence Cowdrill was the leading wicket-taker in the division, with 15 wickets. In 2019, their first season in Division 1, they finished 4th with 4 wins. In 2021, they played in the South East Group of the Twenty20 Cup, finishing 3rd with 3 wins. Hampshire bowler Finty Trussler was the leading wicket-taker across the whole competition, with 16 wickets at an average of 6.50. They finished third in their group of the 2022 Women's Twenty20 Cup. They also joined the South Central Counties Cup in 2022, and won the inaugural edition of the tournament, going unbeaten. They lost in their group final of the 2023 Women's Twenty20 Cup, and finished second in the 2023 South Central Counties Cup on head-to-head record. In 2024, the side finished won their group in the Twenty20 Cup before finishing third at the National Finals, and 6th in their group in the new ECB Women's County One-Day tournament.

== Players ==
=== Current squad ===
- No. denotes the player's squad number, as worn on the back of their shirt.
- ‡ denotes players with international caps.

No.	Name	Nationality	Birth date	Batting style	Bowling style	Notes
Batters
8	Ella McCaughan	England	26 September 2002 (age 24)	Right-handed	Right-arm leg break	
12	Abi Norgrove	England	17 January 2006 (age 20)	Right-handed	Right-arm off break	
14	Maia Bouchier ‡	England	5 December 1998 (age 27)	Right-handed	Right-arm medium	England central contract
—	Shristi Patil	England	22 March 2009 (age 17)	Right-handed	Right-arm leg break	
All-rounders
1	Georgia Adams ‡	England	4 October 1993 (age 33)	Right-handed	Right-arm off break	Club captain
11	Naomi Dattani	England	28 April 1994 (age 32)	Left-handed	Left-arm medium	
13	Francesca Sweet	England	15 June 2004 (age 22)	Right-handed	Right-arm medium	
18	Eliza Bristowe	England	18 October 2008 (age 18)	Right-handed	Right-arm medium	
—	Eva Gray	England	24 May 2000 (age 26)	Right-handed	Right-arm medium	
Wicket-keepers
7	Pippa Sproul ‡	Scotland	12 February 2008 (age 18)	Right-handed	—	
17	Rhianna Southby	England	16 October 2000 (age 26)	Right-handed	—	
Bowlers
15	Daisy Gibb	England	29 November 2005 (age 20)	Right-handed	Right-arm medium	
19	Hannah Hardwick	England	1 May 2004 (age 22)	Right-handed	Right-arm medium	
24	Poppy Tulloch	England	12 April 2006 (age 20)	Right-handed	Right-arm medium	
33	Ava Lee	England	26 August 2005 (age 21)	Right-handed	Right-arm off break	
35	Bex Tyson	England	26 June 2000 (age 26)	Left-handed	Slow left-arm orthodox	
50	Linsey Smith ‡	England	10 March 1995 (age 31)	Left-handed	Slow left-arm orthodox	England central contract
63	Lauren Bell ‡	England	2 January 2001 (age 25)	Right-handed	Right-arm fast-medium	England central contract
—	Eve O'Neill	England	11 May 2008 (age 18)	Right-handed	Right-arm leg break	
Source: Updated: 1 October 2026

=== Notable players ===
Players who have played for Hampshire and played internationally are listed below, in order of first international appearance (given in brackets):

- (England) Betty Snowball (1934)
- (England) Charlotte Edwards (1996)
- (New Zealand) Suzie Bates (2006)
- (Australia) Ellyse Perry (2007)
- (Australia) Amanda-Jade Wellington (2016)
- (England) Katie George (2018)
- (England) Linsey Smith (2018)
- (England) Freya Davies (2019)
- (England) Maia Bouchier (2021)
- (England) Charlie Dean (2021)
- (England) Lauren Bell (2022)
- (England) Freya Kemp (2022)
- (England) Georgia Adams (2024)
- (Scotland) Pippa Sproul (2025)

== Seasons ==
=== Women's County Championship ===
Season	Division	League standings								Notes
Season	Division	P	W	L	T	A/C	BP	Pts	Pos	Notes
1997	Division 3	3	1	2	0	0	16.5	28.5	3rd	
1998	Division 3	5	2	3	0	0	36	60	4th	
1999	Division 3	5	3	2	0	0	36.5	72.5	3rd	
2000	Division 3	5	3	2	0	0	33.5	69.5	4th	
2001	Division 3	4	3	1	0	0	33.5	69.5	2nd	
2002	Division 3	5	3	0	0	2	24.5	82.5	1st	Promoted
2003	Division 2	5	1	4	0	0	26	38	5th	
2004	Division 2	5	2	3	0	0	35	59	4th	
2005	Division 3	6	2	3	0	1	30.5	65.5	4th	Relegated
2006	County Challenge Cup G4	3	3	0	0	0	0	60	1st	Lost promotion playoff
2007	County Challenge Cup Div A	6	1	3	0	2	6	51	3rd	
2008	Division 4	6	1	5	0	0	11	31	4th	
2009	Division 3	10	2	8	0	0	16	56	5th	
2010	Division 3	10	0	10	0	0	38	38	6th	Relegated
2011	Division 4	10	5	3	0	2	49	99	3rd	
2012	Division 3	8	0	2	0	6	3	3	9th	
2013	Division 3	8	2	6	0	0	42	62	8th	
2014	Division 3	8	2	5	0	1	29	49	8th	
2015	Division 3	8	6	1	0	1	49	109	1st	Promoted
2016	Division 2	7	5	2	0	0	45	95	3rd	
2017	Division 2	7	6	1	0	0	51	111	1st	Promoted
2018	Division 1	7	6	1	0	0	49	109	1st	Champions
2019	Division 1	7	3	4	0	0	50	80	5th	

=== Women's Twenty20 Cup ===
Season	Division	League standings								Notes
Season	Division	P	W	L	T	A/C	NRR	Pts	Pos	Notes
2009	Division 5	3	2	1	0	0	−2.73	4	2nd	
2010	Division S2	3	2	1	0	0	+1.48	4	2nd	Lost promotion play-off
2011	Division S2	3	2	1	0	0	− (Note: NRR unknown due to unrecorded matches)	4	2nd	Lost promotion play-off
2012	Division S2	3	1	2	0	0	+1.26	2	3rd	
2013	Division S2	3	2	1	0	0	+0.41	4	2nd	
2014	Division 3A	4	4	0	0	0	+1.61	16	3rd	
2015	Division 3	8	7	1	0	0	+1.54	28	2nd	Promoted
2016	Division 2	7	3	4	0	0	−0.33	12	6th	
2017	Division 2	8	4	2	0	2	+1.08	18	3rd	
2018	Division 2	8	7	1	0	0	+2.27	28	1st	Promoted
2019	Division 1	8	4	3	0	1	−0.19	17	4th	
2021	South East	8	3	3	0	2	+0.28	14	3rd	
2022	Group 6	6	2	4	0	0	–1.00	8	3rd	
2023	Group 5	6	4	2	0	0	+1.07	16	1st	Lost final
2024	Group 4	8	5	3	0	0	+0.44	102	1st	3rd in National Finals Group

=== ECB Women's County One-Day ===
Season	Group	League standings								Notes
Season	Group	P	W	L	T	A/C	BP	Pts	Pos	Notes
2024	Group 4	4	1	3	0	0	0	4	6th	

== Honours ==
- County Championship:
  - Division One champions (1) – 2018
  - Division Two champions (1) – 2017
  - Division Three champions (2) – 2002 & 2015
- Women's Twenty20 Cup
  - Division Two champions (1) – 2018

== See also ==
- Hampshire County Cricket Club
- Southern Vipers
