= Thames Valley Women cricket team =

English women's cricket team

Thames Valley Women
Personnel
- Captain: Debra Stock

Team information
- Founded: Unknown First recorded match: 1972
- Dissolved: 1999

History
- WAC wins: 0
- WCC wins: 0

The Thames Valley Women's cricket team was the women's representative cricket team for the Thames Valley. They competed in the Women's Area Championship from 1980 to 1996 and in the Women's County Championship from 1997 to 1999, after which they were replaced by Berkshire. They competed in Division One of the County Championship in their final season of existence.

== History ==
Thames Valley Women played their first recorded match in 1972, which they drew against Middlesex. Thames Valley went on to play various one-off matches, including a game against a touring Australia in 1976. They joined the Women's Area Championship in 1980, achieving their best finish of 6th in 1992. They joined the Women's County Championship for its inaugural season in 1997, in which they were promoted from Division 2, winning four of their five matches. For the next two seasons they played in Division 1, after which they were disbanded and replaced by Berkshire.

== Players ==
=== Notable players ===
Players who played for Thames Valley and played internationally are listed below, in order of first international appearance (noted in brackets):

- (Australia) Margaret Jude (1963)
- (England) Rosemary Goodchild (1966)
- (England) Glynis Hullah (1973)
- (England) Janet Godman (1991)
- (England) Debra Stock (1992)
- (England) Lucy Pearson (1996)
- (England) Claire Taylor (1998)
- (England) Isa Guha (2001)
- (England) Mandie Godliman (2002)

== Seasons ==
=== Women's County Championship ===
Season	Division	League standings								Notes
Season	Division	P	W	L	T	A/C	BP	Pts	Pos	Notes
1997	Division 2	5	4	1	0	0	35.5	83.5	1st	Promoted
1998	Division 1	5	2	3	0	0	30	54	5th	
1999	Division 1	5	3	2	0	0	36.5	72.5	3rd	

== See also ==
- Berkshire Women cricket team
- List of defunct English women's cricket teams
