= Linda Burnley =

English cricketer

Personal information
- Full name: Linda Burnley
- Bowling: Right-arm leg break
- Role: Wicket-keeper

International information
- National side: England (1990)
- Only ODI (cap 58): 16 August 1990 v Ireland

Domestic team information
- Years: Team
- 1986–1997: Yorkshire

Career statistics
Competition	WODI	WFC	WLA
Matches	1	2	76
Runs scored	30	49	706
Batting average	30.00	24.50	18.10
100s/50s	0/0	0/0	1/1
Top score	30	43*	101
Catches/stumpings	1/–	2/2	42/19
- Source: CricketArchive, 11 March 2021

Linda Burnley is an English former cricketer who played as a wicket-keeper. She appeared in one One Day International for England, against Ireland at Castle Avenue, Dublin in August 1990. She scored 30 runs and took one catch. She played domestic cricket for Yorkshire.
