= Yorkshire Women cricket team =

English women's cricket team

Yorkshire Women
- League: ECB Women's Tier 1

Personnel
- Captain: Lauren Winfield-Hill
- Coach: Rich Pyrah
- Overseas player: Jess Jonassen

Team information
- Founded: Unknown First recorded match: 1935
- Home ground: Headingley Stadium, Leeds

History
- WCC wins: 6
- T20 Cup wins: 0
- WOD League 2 wins: 1

The Yorkshire Women's cricket team is the women's cricket team for the English historic county of Yorkshire. They play their home games at Headingley Stadium, Leeds, and are captained by Lauren Winfield-Hill.

As of the start of the 2025 season Yorkshire Women will play their cricket in Tier 2 of the new division set up after Project Darwin. In 2026 they will move up to Tier 1 of the new division.

== History ==
=== 1935–1996: Early History ===
Yorkshire Women played their first recorded match in 1935, against Yorkshire Cricket Federation Women. They went on to play various one-off matches, often against neighbouring teams such as Lancashire, as well as against touring sides such as Australia and New Zealand. Yorkshire joined the Women's Area Championship in 1980, and played in the competition until it ended in 1996. Yorkshire won the Area Championship six times, including all of the final five tournaments.

=== 1997– : Women's County Championship ===
Yorkshire joined the Women's County Championship for its inaugural season in 1997, and won five of the first six titles, their run only interrupted by East Midlands in 1999. Key for Yorkshire in this period were players such as Kathryn Leng and Melissa Reynard. Soon after this successful period, however, Yorkshire fell away and were relegated in 2005, and then again in 2007, ending up in Division 3. Their return was swift, however, as they were promoted twice, in 2008 and 2009, including an unbeaten season in Division Two.

Ever since, Yorkshire have played in Division One of the Championship, winning the title once more, in 2015. Yorkshire topped Division One with 6 wins from 8 games, and bowler Katie Levick was the second-highest wicket-taker in the division, with 20 at an average of just 9.65. Yorkshire also recorded three 2nd place finishes in a row, between 2017 and 2019.

Yorkshire have also competed in the Women's Twenty20 Cup since 2009. In 2010, they reached the Final but lost to Berkshire by 46 runs. In the following two seasons, Yorkshire reached the semi-finals, but lost to Berkshire again in 2011 and to Sussex in 2012. Yorkshire came close to winning the title again in 2015, finishing the season joint on point with winners Sussex, but with a marginally worse Net Run Rate. Yorkshire struggled over following seasons, and were relegated in 2018 before finishing 4th in Division Two in 2019. In 2021, they competed in the North Group of the Twenty20 Cup, finishing 4th with two wins and six matches abandoned due to rain. They reached the Group 1 final in the 2022 Women's Twenty20 Cup, but lost to Lancashire. In the 2023 Women's Twenty20 Cup, after all of their initial group stage matches were rained-off, they won one of two matches on a group finals day. In 2024, the side finished 3rd in their group in the Twenty20 Cup and 4th in their group in the new ECB Women's County One-Day tournament.

In 2019, they played in Division One of the final season of the Women's County Championship, and have since competed in the Women's Twenty20 Cup. Yorkshire have contributed some players to making up a North Representative XI, and they were partnered with the regional side Northern Diamonds.

=== 2020 – 2024 : Regional Professional Team - Northern Diamonds ===
Between 2020 and 2024 the professional players within the Yorkshire, Durham and Northumberland regions played for the Northern Diamonds. During this period Yorkshire Women's team still existed but as a non professional team.

== Players ==
=== Current squad ===
- No. denotes the player's squad number, as worn on the back of their shirt.
- ‡ denotes players with international caps.

No.	Name	Nationality	Birth date	Batting style	Bowling style	Notes
Batters
6	Ami Campbell	England	6 June 1991 (age 35)	Left-handed	Right-arm medium	
22	Sterre Kalis ‡	Netherlands	30 August 1999 (age 27)	Right-handed	Right-arm medium	
All-rounders
3	Sarah Glenn ‡	England	7 August 1999 (age 27)	Right-handed	Right-arm leg break	England central contract
21	Jess Jonassen ‡	Australia	11 June 1992 (age 34)	Left-handed	Slow left-arm orthodox	Overseas player
42	Beth Langston ‡	England	6 September 1992 (age 34)	Right-handed	Right-arm medium	
77	Ria Fackrell	England	16 September 1999 (age 27)	Right-handed	Right-arm off break	
Wicket-keepers
19	Maddie Ward	England	19 January 2005 (age 21)	Right-handed	–	
35	Alice Clarke	England	4 August 2001 (age 25)	Left-handed	Right-arm medium	
58	Lauren Winfield-Hill ‡	England	16 August 1990 (age 36)	Right-handed	–	Club captain
66	Erin Thomas	England	26 June 2006 (age 20)	Right-handed	—	
Bowlers
11	Claudie Cooper	England	1 May 2002 (age 24)	Right-handed	Right-arm off break	
16	Jessica Woolston	England	25 February 2003 (age 23)	Right-handed	Right-arm medium	
26	Hannah Rainey ‡	Scotland	2 June 1997 (age 29)	Right-handed	Right-arm medium	
72	Rachel Slater ‡	Scotland	20 November 2001 (age 24)	Right-handed	Left-arm medium	
—	Em Arlott ‡	England	23 February 1998 (age 28)	Right-handed	Right-arm medium	England skills contract
Source: Updated: 1 October 2026

=== 2027 Yorkshire Women's Academy Players ===
Alice Acklam, Amelia Love, Amelia Oliver, Ellie Nightingale, Holly Garton, Ines Blackwell, Lucy Randle Bissell, Maiya Charlesworth, Nat Brown, Olivia Breese, Libby Fellows, Gabriella Fontenla.

=== 2027 Yorkshire Women's Emerging Player Programme (EPP) ===
Anishka Nayak, Sophia Byrne, Ariana Ramlakhan, Arya Raval, Eva Venn, Emily Shaw, India Leach, Megan Sugden, Lois George, Olivia Wilkinson, Poppy Smith, Sophia Horsfall Samb

=== Notable players ===
Players who have played for Yorkshire and played internationally are listed below, in order of first international appearance (given in brackets):

- (England) Mona Greenwood (1937)
- (England) Mary Duggan (1949)
- (England) Mary Johnson (1949)
- (England) Barbara Wood (1949)
- (England) Margaret Lockwood (1951)
- (England) Polly Marshall (1954)
- (England) Ruth Westbrook (1957)
- (England) Helen Sharpe (1957)
- (England) Mollie Hunt (1960)
- (England) Lesley Clifford (1966)
- (England) June Stephenson (1966)
- (England) Rosemary Goodchild (1966)
- (Australia) Jill Need (1968)
- (England) Julia Greenwood (1973)
- (England) Sue Hilliam (1973)
- (England) Margaret Peear (1979)
- (England) Janet Tedstone (1979)
- (England) Karen Jobling (1982)
- (England) Jane Powell (1984)
- (England) Sue Metcalfe (1984)
- (England) Jill Stockdale (1984)
- (England) Gillian Smith (1986)
- (England) Amanda Stinson (1986)
- (England) Joan Lee (1986)
- (Ireland) Mary-Pat Moore (1987)
- (England) Debra Maybury (1988)
- (England) Clare Taylor (1988)
- (England) Cathy Cooke (1989)
- (England) Helen Plimmer (1989)
- (Netherlands) Jet van Noortwijk (1989)
- (England) Alison Elder (1990)
- (England) Linda Burnley (1990)
- (England) Kathryn Leng (1995)
- (England) Melissa Reynard (1995)
- (England) Bev Nicholson (1996)
- (England) Nicola Holt (1996)
- (England) Laura Spragg (1999)
- (England) Helen Wardlaw (2002)
- (England) Jenny Gunn (2004)
- (England) Katherine Brunt (2004)
- (England) Danielle Hazell (2009)
- (Australia) Alyssa Healy (2010)
- (Australia) Liz Perry (2010)
- (England) Lauren Winfield-Hill (2013)
- (England) Beth Langston (2013)
- (New Zealand) Leigh Kasperek (2015)
- (Australia) Beth Mooney (2016)
- (Scotland) Becky Glen (2018)
- (Scotland) Rachel Slater (2022)
- (England) Bess Heath (2023)
- (England) Hollie Armitage (2024)
- (United Arab Emirates) Katie Thompson (2025)

== Seasons ==
=== Women's County Championship ===
Season	Division	League standings								Notes
Season	Division	P	W	L	T	A/C	BP	Pts	Pos	Notes
1997	Division 1	5	5	0	0	0	41	101	1st	Champions
1998	Division 1	5	5	0	0	0	40	100	1st	Champions
1999	Division 1	5	3	2	0	0	40.5	76.5	2nd	
2000	Division 1	5	5	0	0	0	42	102	1st	Champions
2001	Division 1	5	5	0	0	0	40.5	100.5	1st	Champions
2002	Division 1	5	3	0	0	2	23.5	81.5	1st	Champions
2003	Division 1	5	2	3	0	0	34.5	58.5	4th	
2004	Division 1	5	3	2	0	0	36.5	72.5	3rd	
2005	Division 1	6	1	3	0	2	24.5	58.5	4th	Relegated
2006	Division 2	6	3	2	0	1	10	74	2nd	
2007	Division 2	6	0	5	0	1	14	24	4th	Relegated
2008	Division 3	6	5	0	0	1	4	110	1st	Promoted
2009	Division 2	10	10	0	0	0	0	200	1st	Promoted
2010	Division 1	10	5	5	0	0	53	103	4th	
2011	Division 1	10	4	4	0	2	34	74	4th	
2012	Division 1	8	0	2	0	6	11	11	8th	
2013	Division 1	8	6	2	0	0	51	111	2nd	
2014	Division 1	8	2	4	0	2	35	55	7th	
2015	Division 1	8	6	1	0	1	47	107	1st	Champions
2016	Division 1	8	4	2	0	2	34	74	4th	
2017	Division 1	7	5	2	0	0	48	98	2nd	
2018	Division 1	7	6	1	0	0	46	106	2nd	
2019	Division 1	7	5	2	0	0	43	93	2nd	

=== Women's Twenty20 Cup ===
Season	Division	League standings								Notes
Season	Division	P	W	L	T	A/C	NRR	Pts	Pos	Notes
2009	Division 2	3	1	1	0	1	−0.05	3	3rd	
2010	Division M&N 1	3	3	0	0	0	+1.64	6	1st	Runners-up
2011	Division M&N 1	3	3	0	0	0	+2.30	6	1st	Lost semi-final
2012	Division M&N 1	3	3	0	0	0	+0.80	6	1st	Lost semi-final
2013	Division M&N 1	3	2	1	0	0	+0.09	4	2nd	
2014	Division 1C	4	2	2	0	0	+0.94	8	4th	
2015	Division 1	8	6	2	0	0	+0.51	24	2nd	
2016	Division 1	7	2	3	0	2	+0.79	10	6th	
2017	Division 1	8	3	5	0	0	−0.21	12	7th	
2018	Division 1	8	2	6	0	0	−0.66	8	8th	Relegated
2019	Division 2	8	4	2	0	2	+1.34	18	4th	
2021	North	8	2	0	0	6	+3.89	14	4th	
2022	Group 1	6	4	2	0	0	–0.20	16	2nd	Lost final
2023	Group 1	6	0	0	0	6	+0.00	6	6th	
2024	Group 1	7	3	2	0	2	+0.44	69	3rd	

=== ECB Women's County One-Day ===
Season	Group	League standings								Notes
Season	Group	P	W	L	T	A/C	BP	Pts	Pos	Notes
2024	Group 1	4	2	2	0	0	1	9	4th	

== Honours ==
- Women's Area Championship:
  - Champions (6) – 1988, 1992, 1993, 1994, 1995, 1996
- County Championship:
  - Division One Champions (6) – 1997, 1998, 2000, 2001, 2002, 2015

== See also ==
- Yorkshire County Cricket Club
- Northern Diamonds
- North Representative XI
