= 2001 Women's County Championship =

- Administrator(s): England and Wales Cricket Board
- Cricket format: 50 over
- Tournament format(s): League system
- Champions: Yorkshire (4th title)
- Participants: 20
- Most runs: Arran Brindle (274)
- Most wickets: Yvonne Craven (13); Susanne White (13)

The 2001 Women's County One-Day Championship was the 5th cricket Women's County Championship season. It took place in July and August and saw 20 county teams compete in a series of divisions. Yorkshire Women won the County Championship as winners of the top division, achieving their fourth Championship title in five seasons.

== Competition format ==
Teams played matches within a series of divisions with the winners of the top division being crowned County Champions. Matches were played using a one day format with 50 overs per side.

The championship works on a points system with positions within the divisions being based on the total points. Points were awarded as follows:

Win: 12 points.
Tie: 6 points.
Loss: Bonus points.
No Result: 11 points.
Abandoned: 11 points.

Up to five batting and five bowling points per side were also available.

== Teams ==
The 2001 Championship consisted of 17 teams: the top two divisions with six teams apiece and Division Three with five teams. Teams played each other once. The Emerging Counties competition was also competed in 2001: a tier below the County Championship, consisting of three teams, playing each other once.

Division One	Berkshire	Kent	Nottinghamshire	Staffordshire	Surrey	Yorkshire
Division Two	Cheshire	Derbyshire	Hertfordshire	Lancashire	Somerset	Sussex
Division Three	Essex	Hampshire	Middlesex	Warwickshire	Wiltshire	
Emerging Counties	Cumbria	Durham	Northamptonshire			

== County Championship ==
=== Division One ===
Team	Pld	W	L	T	A	Bat	Bowl	Ded	Pts
Yorkshire (C)	5	5	0	0	0	19	21.5	0	100.5
Berkshire	5	3	2	0	0	18	21	0	75
Staffordshire	5	3	2	0	0	16.5	18.5	0	71
Nottinghamshire	5	3	2	0	0	14.5	18.5	0	69
Surrey	5	1	4	0	0	12.5	14.5	0	39
Kent (R)	5	0	5	0	0	9.5	15	0	24.5

Source: Cricket Archive

=== Division Two ===
Team	Pld	W	L	T	A	Bat	Bowl	Ded	Pts
Sussex (P)	5	5	0	0	0	22.5	20.5	0	103
Lancashire	5	3	2	0	0	17.5	18.5	0	72
Somerset	5	3	2	0	0	17	17	0	70
Derbyshire	5	2	3	0	0	15	16.5	0	55.5
Hertfordshire	5	1	4	0	0	12	16	0	40
Cheshire (R)	5	1	4	0	0	12.5	13	0	37.5

Source: Cricket Archive

=== Division Three ===
Team	Pld	W	L	T	A	Bat	Bowl	Ded	Pts
Middlesex (P)	4	4	0	0	0	20	18.5	0	86.5
Hampshire	4	3	1	0	0	18	15.5	0	69.5
Essex	4	2	2	0	0	16	15.5	0	55.5
Warwickshire	4	1	3	0	0	11	10.5	0	33.5
Wiltshire	4	0	4	0	0	8.5	9	0	17.5

Source: Cricket Archive

== Emerging Counties ==
Durham were promoted to join Division Three. Full match results and table are unrecorded.

== Statistics ==
=== Most runs ===
Player	Team	Matches	Innings	Runs	Average	HS	100s	50s
Arran Brindle	Lancashire	5	5	274	68.50	128*	1	1
Chanderkanta Kaul	Middlesex	4	4	250	62.50	95	0	3
Haidee Tiffen	Sussex	5	4	244	244.00	132*	2	0
Sue Redfern	Derbyshire	5	5	234	46.80	90	0	2
Jane Smit	Nottinghamshire	5	5	234	71.66	70*	0	3

Source: CricketArchive

=== Most wickets ===
Player	Team	Balls	Wickets	Average	BBI	5w
Yvonne Craven	Berkshire	297	13	9.61	4/22	0
Susanne White	Lancashire	265	13	10.76	5/29	1
Alexis Mannion	Essex	222	12	12.08	5/30	2
Hannah Lloyd	Somerset	185	10	9.70	3/4	0
Clare Connor	Sussex	264	9	8.66	3/9	0

Source: CricketArchive
