= Sarah Clarke (cricketer) =

English cricketer (born 1982)

Personal information
- Full name: Sarah Louise Clarke
- Born: 28 March 1982 (age 44); Croydon, Greater London, England
- Batting: Right-handed
- Bowling: Right-arm leg break
- Role: All-rounder

International information
- National side: England (2001–2002)
- ODI debut (cap 92): 10 August 2001 v Scotland
- Last ODI: 24 January 2002 v India

Domestic team information
- Years: Team
- 1999–2015: Surrey

Career statistics
| Competition | WODI | WFC | WLA | WT20 |
|---|---|---|---|---|
| Matches | 6 | 1 | 146 | 15 |
| Runs scored | 68 | 6 | 1,402 | 1,402 |
| Batting average | 22.66 | 6.00 | 13.61 | 13.61 |
| 100s/50s | 0/1 | 0/0 | 0/4 | 0/4 |
| Top score | 66* | 6 | 74 | 34* |
| Balls bowled | 119 | 50 | 5,663 | 209 |
| Wickets | 5 | 3 | 169 | 10 |
| Bowling average | 16.80 | 7.33 | 21.57 | 16.90 |
| 5 wickets in innings | 0 | 0 | 2 | 0 |
| 10 wickets in match | – | 0 | – | – |
| Best bowling | 4/15 | 2/0 | 5/11 | 3/6 |
| Catches/stumpings | 0/– | 2/– | 46/– | 8/– |
- Source: CricketArchive, 7 March 2021

Sarah Louise Clarke (born 28 March 1982) is an English former cricketer who played as an all-rounder. She was a right-arm leg break bowler and right-handed batter. She appeared in six One Day Internationals for England She played county cricket for Surrey from 1999 to 2015.

Clarke made her international debut against Scotland in August 2001 and scored 66* batting at number seven. She and Nicky Shaw shared a stand of 85*, which was at the time a record eighth wicket partnership in Women's One Day Internationals until it was broken by Nilakshi de Silva and Oshadi Ranasinghe for Sri Lanka against England in 2019. Clarke's final match came against India in January 2002. In total she took five wickets at an average of 16.80, including a spell of 4 for 15 against Ireland in August 2001.

Her best bowling figures of 6 for 11 for club side Purley Redoubtables came against Leeds & Broomfield in 2010, surpassing her previous best of 6–17 in the ECB Cup semi-final of 2001 against North Riding WCC.

In May 2015, Clarke was one of the first four women to be formally capped by Surrey County Cricket Club, along with Katherine Robson, Cecily Scutt and Nat Sciver.

In June 2015, Clarke became the leading wicket taker for Surrey Women in limited overs cricket by taking 4 for 11 against Lancashire, surpassing Caroline Barrs (120 wickets) as the record holder.
