= Dawn Holden =

English cricketer (born 1980)

Personal information
- Full name: Dawn Holden
- Born: 1 September 1980 (age 46); Wellingborough, Northamptonshire, England
- Batting: Right-handed
- Bowling: Slow left-arm orthodox
- Role: Bowler

International information
- National side: England (1999–2004)
- Test debut (cap 130): 24 June 2001 v Australia
- Last Test: 14 January 2002 v India
- ODI debut (cap 82): 19 July 1999 v Netherlands
- Last ODI: 6 August 2004 v New Zealand

Domestic team information
- Years: Team
- 1997–1999: East Midlands
- 2000–2004: Nottinghamshire
- 2001/02–2004/05: Western Australia
- 2007/08: Queensland

Career statistics
Competition	WTest	WODI	WFC	WLA
Matches	3	32	5	120
Runs scored	51	154	64	1,251
Batting average	12.75	8.55	9.14	16.90
100s/50s	0/0	0/0	0/0	0/4
Top score	24	26	24	76*
Balls bowled	330	1,291	570	5,766
Wickets	3	25	8	116
Bowling average	46.66	31.04	28.87	28.67
5 wickets in innings	0	0	0	0
10 wickets in match	0	0	0	0
Best bowling	2/62	3/29	3/25	4/17
Catches/stumpings	1/–	6/–	2/0	27/–
- Source: CricketArchive, 12 February 2021

Dawn Holden (born 1 September 1980) is an English former cricketer who played as a slow left-arm orthodox bowler and right-handed batter. She played 3 Test matches and 32 One Day Internationals for England between 1999 and 2004. She played domestic cricket for East Midlands, Nottinghamshire, Western Australia and Queensland.
