= 1997 Women's County Championship =

- Administrator(s): Women's Cricket Association
- Cricket format: 50 over
- Tournament format(s): League system
- Champions: Yorkshire (1st title)
- Participants: 16
- Most runs: Jane Smit (429)
- Most wickets: Helen Pack (11)

The 1997 Women's County One-Day Championship was the inaugural cricket Women's County Championship season, succeeding the Women's Area Championship. It took place in July and saw 7 county teams, 3 county Second XIs and 6 regional teams compete in a series of divisions. Yorkshire Women won the title, topping Division 1 unbeaten.

== Competition format ==
Teams played matches within a series of divisions with the winners of the top division being crowned County Champions. Matches were played using a one day format with 50 overs per side.

The championship works on a points system with positions within the divisions being based on the total points. Points were awarded as follows:

Win: 12 points.
Tie: 6 points.
Loss: Bonus points.
No Result: 11 points.
Abandoned: 11 points.

Up to five batting and five bowling points per side were also available.

== Teams ==
The 1997 Championship consisted of 16 teams, with Divisions One and Two consisting of six teams apiece and Division Three with four teams. Teams played each other once.

Division One	East Anglia	Kent	Surrey	West Midlands	West of England	Yorkshire
Division Two	East Midlands	Lancashire and Cheshire	Middlesex	Thames Valley	Sussex	Yorkshire Second XI
Division Three	Derbyshire	Hampshire	Surrey Second XI	Sussex Second XI		

== Qualifier ==
5 July 1997
Scorecard

Surrey Second XI; 76 (47.1 overs)	v	Yorkshire Second XI; 85 (47.2 overs)
Enid Bakewell 19 (89); Joanne de Tute 5/19 (9 overs)		Alison Elder 26 (77); Enid Bakewell 3/11 (10 overs)

Yorkshire Second XI won by 9 runs
Queens' and Robinson College Grounds, Cambridge
Umpires: Alan Fox and John Hayes

- Surrey Second XI won the toss and elected to field.
- Yorkshire Second XI to compete in Division Two.

== Division One ==
Team	Pld	W	L	T	A	Bat	Bowl	Ded	Pts
Yorkshire (C)	5	5	0	0	0	21	20	0	101
West Midlands	5	3	2	0	0	15	17.5	0	68.5
Surrey	5	3	2	0	0	19	12	0	67
West of England	5	2	3	0	0	17	12	0	53
Kent	5	1	4	0	0	16.5	15	0	43.5
East Anglia (R)	5	1	4	0	0	17	5	0	34

Source: Cricket Archive

== Division Two ==
Team	Pld	W	L	T	A	Bat	Bowl	Ded	Pts
Thames Valley (P)	5	4	1	0	0	19	16.5	0	83.5
Lancashire and Cheshire	5	3	2	0	0	18.5	20.5	0	75
East Midlands	5	3	2	0	0	20	15.5	0	71.5
Yorkshire Second XI	5	3	2	0	0	15.5	17	0	68.5
Middlesex	5	1	4	0	0	16	10	0	38
Sussex	5	1	4	0	0	12	13	0	37

Source: Cricket Archive

== Division Three ==
Team	Pld	W	L	T	A	Bat	Bowl	Ded	Pts
Derbyshire (P)	3	3	0	0	0	11	10.5	0	57.5
Surrey Second XI	3	2	1	0	0	10.5	10.5	0	45
Hampshire	3	1	2	0	0	8	8.5	0	28.5
Sussex Second XI	3	0	3	0	0	6.5	2.5	0	9

Source: Cricket Archive

== Statistics ==
=== Most runs ===
Player	Team	Matches	Innings	Runs	Average	HS	100s	50s
Jane Smit	East Midlands	5	5	429	143.00	136	2	2
Ruth Lupton	Surrey	5	5	296	74.00	151*	1	1
Claire Taylor	Thames Valley	5	5	296	98.66	97	0	3
Lucy McGrother	Lancashire and Cheshire	5	5	276	69.00	95*	0	2
Mandy Freeman	Surrey	5	5	226	45.20	104	1	1

Source: CricketArchive

=== Most wickets ===
Player	Team	Balls	Wickets	Average	BBI	5w
Helen Pack	West Midlands	300	11	9.18	4/21	0
Amanda Beehag	Surrey Second XI	101	9	6.44	6/12	1
Debra Stock	Thames Valley	281	9	12.77	4/14	0
Allyson Byrne	Lancashire and Cheshire	240	9	16.11	3/23	0
Karen Smithies	East Midlands	227	8	10.25	6/15	1

Source: CricketArchive
