= Janet Tedstone =

English cricketer (born 1959)

Personal information
- Full name: Janet Cathryn Tedstone
- Born: 13 September 1959 (age 67); Southport, Lancashire, England
- Batting: Right-handed
- Bowling: Right-arm medium
- Role: All-rounder

International information
- National side: England (1979–1992)
- Test debut (cap 88): 6 July 1984 v New Zealand
- Last Test: 19 February 1992 v Australia
- ODI debut (cap 30): 7 July 1979 v West Indies
- Last ODI: 25 January 1992 v Australia

Domestic team information
- Years: Team
- 1980–1982: West Midlands
- 1983–1996: Yorkshire

Career statistics
Competition	WTest	WODI	WFC	WLA
Matches	12	38	27	139
Runs scored	266	146	689	1,781
Batting average	22.16	18.25	24.60	27.82
100s/50s	0/1	0/0	1/2	1/6
Top score	55*	23*	112	130
Balls bowled	1,425	2,227	3,456	6,743
Wickets	12	46	32	183
Bowling average	40.75	22.41	39.21	15.97
5 wickets in innings	0	0	0	1
10 wickets in match	0	0	0	0
Best bowling	3/26	4/17	3/26	5/24
Catches/stumpings	3/–	5/–	9/–	36/–
- Source: CricketArchive, 27 February 2021

Janet Cathryn Tedstone (born 12 September 1959) is an English former cricketer who played as a right-handed batter and right-arm medium bowler. She appeared in 12 Test matches and 38 One Day Internationals for England between 1979 and 1992. She played domestic cricket for West Midlands and Yorkshire.
