= Jane Smit =

England cricketer

Personal information
- Full name: Jane Smit
- Born: 24 December 1972 (age 53); Ilkeston, Derbyshire, England
- Batting: Right-handed
- Role: Wicket-keeper
- Relatives: David Smit (brother)

International information
- National side: England (1992–2008)
- Test debut (cap 114): 19 February 1992 v Australia
- Last Test: 29 August 2006 v India
- ODI debut (cap 64): 20 July 1993 v Denmark
- Last ODI: 23 August 2007 v New Zealand
- T20I debut (cap 10): 5 August 2004 v New Zealand
- Last T20I: 1 February 2008 v Australia

Domestic team information
- Years: Team
- 1989–1999: East Midlands
- 2000–2017: Nottinghamshire

Career statistics
| Competition | WTest | WODI | WT20I | WLA |
|---|---|---|---|---|
| Matches | 21 | 109 | 4 | 323 |
| Runs scored | 554 | 1,003 | 1 | 6,529 |
| Batting average | 24.08 | 17.91 | – | 31.69 |
| 100s/50s | 0/2 | 0/4 | 0/0 | 6/35 |
| Top score | 69 | 91 | 1* | 136 |
| Balls bowled | – | – | – | 354 |
| Wickets | – | – | – | 7 |
| Bowling average | – | – | – | 40.00 |
| 5 wickets in innings | – | – | – | 0 |
| 10 wickets in match | – | – | – | 0 |
| Best bowling | – | – | – | 2/30 |
| Catches/stumpings | 39/4 | 69/45 | 3/1 | 250/121 |
- Source: CricketArchive, 6 March 2021

Jane Smit (born 24 December 1972) is an English former cricketer who played as a wicket-keeper and right-handed batter. She appeared in 21 Test matches, 109 One Day Internationals and 4 Twenty20 Internationals for England between 1992 and 2008 and was part of the team which regained the Ashes in 2005. She played domestic cricket for East Midlands from 1989 to 1999 and Nottinghamshire from 2000 to 2017.

In the 2000 Women's Cricket World Cup in New Zealand, Smit and Claire Taylor shared a partnership of 188* against Sri Lanka at Bert Sutcliffe Oval, Lincoln. It remains the highest fifth-wicket partnership in Women's One Day Internationals.

Smit holds the record for most dismissals as wicket-keeper in Women's Cricket World Cup history (40).

Her brother David represented Derbyshire Cricket Board in List A cricket between 1999 and 2002.
