= Women's Area Championship =

- Administrator: Women's Cricket Association
- Format: Limited overs cricket
- First edition: 1980
- Latest edition: 1996
- Tournament format: League system in two divisions
- Most successful: Yorkshire (6 titles)

The Women's Area Championship was a women's cricket competition organised by the Women's Cricket Association that ran from 1980 until 1996. It operated as a 55-over limited overs cricket competition, with teams organised into a number of groups, often with a final. It was replaced in 1997 by the Women's County Championship.

The teams competing in the Championship were a variety of county teams, county Second XIs, regional teams and Invitational XIs. The tournament was the first formalised women's cricket competition in England, with teams having previously only played one-off and friendly matches. Between 1988 and 1994, the competition was followed by the Women's Territorial Tournament, competed for by regional sides selected from the Area Championship teams.

Yorkshire were the most successful side in the history of the Area Championship, winning six titles, including all of the last five tournaments. East Midlands and Middlesex won three titles apiece.

== History ==
The inaugural Women's Area Championship took place in 1980, with 12 teams taking part in four regional groups. Middlesex beat West Midlands in the final to become the first Champions. The initial twelve teams became regular competitors over the course of the tournament, briefly joined by the WCA Invitational XI in 1986 and 1989, by A Woods' XI and BA Daniels' XI in 1990, and by Surrey Second XI in the final two seasons. After 1988, the tournament was dominated by two teams: Yorkshire and East Midlands. They played each other in three finals, and overall Yorkshire achieved six titles and three runners-up places in this period, and East Midlands gained three titles and four runners-up places.

== Structure ==
The Women's Area Championship went through a variety of formats throughout its existence. Initially, teams played in four regional groups, with the winners progressing to the semi-finals. Later on, teams played in two pools, with the winners proceeding to the final. In the final two seasons of the Championship, teams were organised into two divisions with promotion and relegation, with the winner of Division One being crowned the Champions: this format was carried forward into the Women's County Championship. The teams that played in the tournament were:

Team	First	Last	Titles	Ref
A Woods' XI	1990	1990	0	
BA Daniels' XI	1990	1990	0	
East Anglia	1980	1996	0	
East Midlands	1980	1996	3	
Kent	1980	1996	2	
Kent Second XI	1985	1985	0	
Lancashire and Cheshire	1980	1996	0	
Middlesex	1980	1996	3	
Surrey	1980	1996	0	
Surrey Second XI	1994	1996	0	
Sussex	1980	1996	0	
Thames Valley	1980	1996	0	
WCA Invitational XI	1986	1989	0	
West	1980	1996	0	
West Midlands	1980	1996	1	
Yorkshire	1980	1996	6	
Yorkshire Second XI	1980	1996	0	

== Winners ==
Season	Winner	Runner-up	Ref
1980	Middlesex	West Midlands	
1981	Middlesex	East Midlands	
1982	West Midlands	East Anglia	
1983	Not held (Note: No Area Championship was listed in the Women's Cricket Association fixture list for the 1983 season. Various counties instead held Golden Jubilee events, to celebrate the 50th anniversary of their formation. The Middlesex Jubilee Tournament involved inter-area matches, and was won by West Midlands.)		
1984	Not held (Note: In order that tour matches during the New Zealand tour of England could go ahead without clashes.)		
1985	Middlesex	Kent	
1986	Kent	West	
1987	Kent	East Midlands	
1988	Yorkshire	Surrey	
1989	East Midlands	Surrey	
1990	East Midlands	Yorkshire	
1991	East Midlands	Yorkshire	
1992	Yorkshire	East Midlands	
1993	Yorkshire	East Midlands	
1994	Yorkshire	East Midlands	
1995	Yorkshire	East Midlands	
1996	Yorkshire	West Midlands	

== See also ==
- Women's County Championship
- Women's Territorial Tournament
