= 2024 ECB Women's County One-Day =

English cricket season

- Dates: 21 April 2024 – 1 September 2024
- Administrator(s): England and Wales Cricket Board
- Cricket format: 50-over cricket
- Tournament format(s): Regional groups
- Champions: No overall winner
- Participants: 34
- Matches: 68
- Most runs: Bryony Gillgrass (186)
- Most wickets: Katie Donovan (12); Georgie Harrison (12)

The 2024 ECB Women's County One-Day was an English women's cricket 50-over domestic competition. It took place between April and July 2024, with 34 teams taking part, organised into four regional groups. It was the first nationally-organised 50-over women's county competition since the 2019 Women's County Championship, and ran alongside the Women's Twenty20 Cup.

There was no overall winner, with Lancashire, Leicestershire and Rutland, Devon and Sussex winning their individual groups.

== Format ==
Teams played matches within a series of regional groups, playing four matches. Matches were played using a 50-over format.

The groups worked on a points system with positions being based on total points. Points were awarded as follows:

Win: 4 points.
Tie: 2 points.
Abandoned/Cancelled: 1 point.
Loss: 0 points.

A bonus point was given where the winning team's run rate was 1.25 or greater times that of the opposition.

== Teams ==
Teams were divided into four regional groups. Group 1 consisted of 8 teams, Groups 2 and 3 consisted of 10 teams and Group 4 consisted of 6 teams.

| Group 1 | Derbyshire | Lancashire | North East Warriors | Nottinghamshire | Scotland | Shropshire | Staffordshire | Yorkshire | | |
| Group 2 | Berkshire | Buckinghamshire | Cambridgeshire | Hertfordshire | Huntingdonshire | Leicestershire and Rutland | Lincolnshire | Norfolk | Northamptonshire | Suffolk |
| Group 3 | Cornwall | Devon | Dorset | Gloucestershire | Oxfordshire | Somerset | Wales | Warwickshire | Wiltshire | Worcestershire |
| Group 4 | Essex | Hampshire | Kent | Middlesex | Surrey | Sussex | | | | |

== Standings ==
=== Group 1 ===
| Pos | Team | Pld | W | L | T | NR | BP | Pts | NRR |
|---|---|---|---|---|---|---|---|---|---|
| 1 | Lancashire | 4 | 3 | 0 | 0 | 1 | 2 | 15 | 1.630 |
| 2 | Staffordshire | 4 | 3 | 1 | 0 | 0 | 2 | 14 | 0.730 |
| 3 | Derbyshire | 4 | 3 | 1 | 0 | 0 | 1 | 13 | 0.840 |
| 4 | Yorkshire | 4 | 2 | 2 | 0 | 0 | 1 | 9 | 0.720 |
| 5 | Shropshire | 4 | 2 | 2 | 0 | 0 | 1 | 9 | −1.100 |
| 6 | North East Warriors | 4 | 1 | 2 | 0 | 1 | 1 | 6 | −0.200 |
| 7 | Scotland | 4 | 0 | 2 | 0 | 2 | 0 | 2 | −2.710 |
| 8 | Nottinghamshire | 4 | 0 | 4 | 0 | 0 | 0 | 0 | −1.230 |

Source: Play-Cricket

=== Group 2 ===
| Pos | Team | Pld | W | L | T | NR | BP | Pts | NRR |
|---|---|---|---|---|---|---|---|---|---|
| 1 | Leicestershire and Rutland | 4 | 4 | 0 | 0 | 0 | 4 | 20 | 2.280 |
| 2 | Hertfordshire | 4 | 3 | 0 | 0 | 1 | 3 | 16 | 1.790 |
| 3 | Berkshire | 4 | 3 | 1 | 0 | 0 | 3 | 15 | 0.290 |
| 4 | Northamptonshire | 4 | 2 | 2 | 0 | 0 | 2 | 10 | 0.830 |
| 5 | Suffolk | 4 | 2 | 2 | 0 | 0 | 2 | 10 | 0.350 |
| 6 | Cambridgeshire | 4 | 2 | 1 | 0 | 1 | 1 | 10 | −0.140 |
| 7 | Buckinghamshire | 4 | 1 | 2 | 0 | 1 | 1 | 6 | −0.960 |
| 8 | Norfolk | 4 | 1 | 3 | 0 | 0 | 0 | 4 | −0.580 |
| 9 | Lincolnshire | 4 | 0 | 3 | 0 | 1 | 0 | 1 | −2.430 |
| 10 | Huntingdonshire | 4 | 0 | 4 | 0 | 0 | 0 | 0 | −2.810 |

Source: Play-Cricket

=== Group 3 ===
| Pos | Team | Pld | W | L | T | NR | BP | Pts | NRR |
|---|---|---|---|---|---|---|---|---|---|
| 1 | Devon | 4 | 4 | 0 | 0 | 0 | 4 | 20 | 2.810 |
| 2 | Gloucestershire | 4 | 4 | 0 | 0 | 0 | 4 | 20 | 2.260 |
| 3 | Worcestershire | 4 | 3 | 1 | 0 | 0 | 2 | 14 | 0.800 |
| 4 | Wales | 4 | 2 | 1 | 0 | 1 | 2 | 11 | 1.890 |
| 5 | Somerset | 4 | 1 | 2 | 1 | 0 | 1 | 7 | −0.600 |
| 6 | Wiltshire | 4 | 1 | 2 | 0 | 1 | 1 | 6 | −1.450 |
| 7 | Cornwall | 4 | 1 | 3 | 0 | 0 | 1 | 5 | −0.500 |
| 8 | Oxfordshire | 4 | 1 | 2 | 0 | 1 | 0 | 5 | −1.080 |
| 9 | Dorset | 4 | 0 | 3 | 1 | 0 | 0 | 2 | −1.800 |
| 10 | Warwickshire | 4 | 0 | 3 | 0 | 1 | 0 | 1 | −3.350 |

Source: Play-Cricket

=== Group 4 ===
| Pos | Team | Pld | W | L | T | NR | BP | Pts | NRR |
|---|---|---|---|---|---|---|---|---|---|
| 1 | Sussex | 4 | 3 | 0 | 0 | 1 | 1 | 14 | 0.620 |
| 2 | Surrey | 4 | 2 | 1 | 0 | 1 | 2 | 11 | 1.700 |
| 3 | Kent | 4 | 2 | 1 | 0 | 1 | 2 | 11 | 0.750 |
| 4 | Essex | 4 | 1 | 2 | 0 | 1 | 1 | 6 | −0.320 |
| 5 | Middlesex | 4 | 1 | 3 | 0 | 0 | 1 | 5 | −1.160 |
| 6 | Hampshire | 4 | 1 | 3 | 0 | 0 | 0 | 4 | −1.130 |

Source: Play-Cricket

== Fixtures ==
=== Group 1 ===
21 April 2024
11:00 BST
Scorecard

| Staffordshire; 118 (33 overs) | v | Shropshire; 122/9 (45.1 overs) |
| Lucy Shenton 30* (79); Amy Griffiths 3/37 (10 overs) | | Alex Hale 28 (72); Georgie Harrison 5/28 (10 overs) |

Shropshire won by 1 wicket
Wem Cricket Club, Wem
Umpires: Nicola Owen and Avril Welch

- Shropshire won the toss and elected to bowl.

21 April 2024
11:00 BST
Scorecard

| Lancashire | v | Scotland |

Match Cancelled

21 April 2024
11:00 BST
Scorecard

| Yorkshire; 235/6 (50 overs) | v | North East Warriors; 213 (49.1 overs) |
| Erin Thomas 60 (72); Olivia Miller 1/12 (3 overs) | | Layla Tipton 77 (97); Bethany Slater 4/32 (10 overs) |

Yorkshire won by 22 runs
Riverside Ground, Chester-le-Street
Umpires: Julian Shaw and Mark Pacitto

- Yorkshire won the toss and elected to bat.

21 April 2024
11:00 BST
Scorecard

| Nottinghamshire; 132 (40.4 overs) | v | Derbyshire; 133/5 (45.3 overs) |
| Emily Hughes 34 (94); Pagan Hardwick 3/38 (10 overs) | | Sophia McCollum 31 (80); Maddie Ward 3/15 (10 overs) |

Derbyshire won by 5 wickets
Worksop College, Worksop

- Derbyshire won the toss and elected to bowl.

6 May 2024
11:00 BST
Scorecard

| Derbyshire; 160 (49.2 overs) | v | Staffordshire; 154/7 (32.3 overs) |
| Lara Shaw 30 (26); Lucy Shenton 4/22 (9.2 overs) | | Poppy Davies 67* (66); Emma Thatcher 3/31 (6.3 overs) |

Staffordshire won by 3 wickets (DLS)
Milford Hall Cricket Club, Milford
Umpires: Avtar Devgon and Martin Gentle

- Staffordshire won the toss and elected to bowl.
- Staffordshire target revised to 154 from 46 overs due to rain.

6 May 2024
11:00 BST
Scorecard

| Nottinghamshire; 154 (38.3 overs) | v | Shropshire; 157/4 (28 overs) |
| Maddie Ward 41 (46); Robyn Mathews 3/2 (2.3 overs) | | Robyn Mathews 50 (64); Maddie Ward 2/22 (7 overs) |

Shropshire won by 6 wickets
Allscott Cricket Club, Allscott
Umpires: Nathan Bartram and Kelly Wainwright

- Shropshire won the toss and elected to bowl.

6 May 2024
11:00 BST
Scorecard

| North East Warriors | v | Scotland |

Match Cancelled
South Northumberland Cricket Club, Gosforth

6 May 2024
11:00 BST
Scorecard

| Lancashire; 134 (35.1 overs) | v | Yorkshire; 112 (29.4 overs) |
| Shachi Pai 54 (90); Lucy Randle-Bissell 6/23 (7 overs) | | Erin Thomas 46 (59); Laura Jackson 4/18 (8 overs) |

Lancashire won by 22 runs
Castleford Cricket Club, Castleford

- Yorkshire won the toss and elected to bowl.

30 June 2024
11:00 BST
Scorecard

| Lancashire; 222/9 (50 overs) | v | North East Warriors; 108 (34.1 overs) |
| Alice Clarke 62 (82); Emily Whiting 3/21 (7 overs) | | Harriet Robson 27 (36); Olivia Bell 4/19 (10 overs) |

Lancashire won by 114 runs
Croston Cricket Club, Croston
Umpires: Kenneth Ashworth and Martin Burke

- Lancashire won the toss and elected to bat.

30 June 2024
11:00 BST
Scorecard

| Derbyshire; 297/8 (50 overs) | v | Shropshire; 113 (36 overs) |
| Megan Pittman 77 (94); Freya Jones 3/77 (9 overs) | | Ava Clive 40 (61); Pagan Hardwick 4/26 (10 overs) |

Derbyshire won by 184 runs
Spondon Cricket Club, Spondon

- Shropshire won the toss and elected to bowl.

30 June 2024
11:00 BST
Scorecard

| Yorkshire; 255/9 (50 overs) | v | Scotland; 108 (21.5 overs) |
| Frances Lonsdale 81 (110); Charis Scott 3/38 (8 overs) | | Lorna Jack 34 (35); Jessica Woolston 4/23 (5 overs) |

Yorkshire won by 147 runs

- Yorkshire won the toss and elected to bat.

14 July 2024
11:00 BST
Scorecard

| Scotland; 98 (43 overs) | v | Staffordshire; 99/3 (24.1 overs) |
| Chloe Abel 42* (69); Georgie Harrison 3/24 (10 overs) | | Poppy Davies 45* (39); Chloe Abel 1/17 (5 overs) |

Staffordshire won by 7 wickets
Denstone College, Denstone
Umpires: Bob Wassail and Kelly Wainwright

- Staffordshire won the toss and elected to bowl.

14 July 2024
11:00 BST
Scorecard

| Shropshire; 96 (35.3 overs) | v | North East Warriors; 97/3 (20 overs) |
| Zara Collinson 14 (23); Layla Tipton 4/23 (6 overs) | | Grace Thompson 38 (51); Kate Brazier 2/25 (6 overs) |

North East Warriors won by 7 wickets
Wem Cricket Club, Wem
Umpires: Rodney Jones and Jonathan Prince

- North East Warriors won the toss and elected to bowl.

14 July 2024
11:00 BST
Scorecard

| Derbyshire; 127 (32.5 overs) | v | Yorkshire; 125 (44.4 overs) |
| Natasha Allen 48 (47); Elicia Pollard 4/8 (5 overs) | | Erin Thomas 28 (45); Adrianna Darlow 4/16 (10 overs) |

Derbyshire won by 2 runs
Rolleston Cricket Club, Rolleston on Dove

- Derbyshire won the toss and elected to bat.

14 July 2024
11:00 BST
Scorecard

| Nottinghamshire; 103 (32.3 overs) | v | Lancashire; 106/4 (22 overs) |
| Maddie Ward 31 (60); Martha Rimmer 3/1 (2.3 overs) | | Summer Carrington 35* (51); Rhiannon Knowling-Davies 2/21 (4 overs) |

Lancashire won by 6 wickets
Collingham Cricket Club, Collingham

- Lancashire won the toss and elected to bowl.

25 August 2024
11:00 BST
Scorecard

| Nottinghamshire; 162 (41.3 overs) | v | Staffordshire; 165/8 (45.2 overs) |
| Emily Hughes 34 (79); Georgie Harrison 3/24 (10 overs) | | Lucy Shenton 48* (86); Evee-Mae Hicklin 2/20 (10 overs) |

Staffordshire won by 2 wickets
Flintham Cricket Club, Flintham

- Staffordshire won the toss and elected to bowl.
- Match rearranged from 30 June 2024.

=== Group 2 ===
21 April 2024
11:00 BST
Scorecard

| Buckinghamshire; 191 (47.5 overs) | v | Berkshire; 192/2 (27.5 overs) |
| Cara Duggan 51 (98); Mary Briscoe 2/21 (3.5 overs) | | Poppy Tulloch 84 (86); Cara Duggan 2/30 (4 overs) |

Berkshire won by 8 wickets
The Watson Oval, Jack's Booth Ground, Theale
Umpires: John Reed and Darren Hill

- Berkshire won the toss and elected to bowl.

21 April 2024
11:00 BST
Scorecard

| Leicestershire and Rutland; 303/6 (50 overs) | v | Cambridgeshire; 100 (22.4 overs) |
| Rebecca Brooker 145 (137); Laura Robinson 3/47 (10 overs) | | May Busher 36 (40); April Herathge 4/28 (6 overs) |

Leicestershire and Rutland won by 203 runs
Sawston Cricket Club, Sawston
Umpires: Rupert Bull and A Hayward

- Cambridgeshire won the toss and elected to bowl.

21 April 2024
11:00 BST
Scorecard

| Hertfordshire; 233 (48.5 overs) | v | Suffolk; 148 (46.5 overs) |
| Ella Phillips 65 (85); Imogen Sidhu 2/33 (10 overs) | | Olivia Locke 20 (44); Gemma Marriott 3/9 (4.5 overs) |

Hertfordshire won by 85 runs
Letchworth Garden City Cricket Club, Letchworth Garden City

- Suffolk won the toss and elected to bowl.

21 April 2024
11:00 BST
Scorecard

| Huntingdonshire; 66 (31.1 overs) | v | Northamptonshire; 67/2 (12.3 overs) |
| Annabelle Woodward 16 (32); Patricia Hankins 2/9 (5 overs) | | Abigail Butcher 30 (16); Holly Chambers 2/11 (4 overs) |

Northamptonshire won by 8 wickets
Burghley Park Cricket Club, Stamford

- Huntingdonshire won the toss and elected to bat.

21 April 2024
11:00 BST
Scorecard

| Lincolnshire; 177 (48 overs) | v | Norfolk; 178/6 (40.3 overs) |
| Abigail Hannan 82 (119); Niamh Rushton 2/10 (5 overs) | | May Drinkell 67 (89); Abigail Hannan 3/36 (10 overs) |

Norfolk won by 4 wickets
Seas End Hall, Moulton

- Lincolnshire won the toss and elected to bat.

6 May 2024
11:00 BST
Scorecard

| Hertfordshire; 57/1 (15 overs) | v | Buckinghamshire |
| Kezia Hassall 27* (50); Cara Duggan 1/21 (4 overs) |

No Result
Dinton Cricket Club, Dinton
Umpires: Yolanda Harris and Eloise Porter

- Buckinghamshire won the toss and elected to field.
- No further play possible due to rain.

6 May 2024
11:00 BST
Scorecard

| Huntingdonshire; 117 (37.2 overs) | v | Leicestershire and Rutland; 118/4 (27.1 overs) |
| Faith Teekasingh 50 (81); D'Nica Roff 6/17 (8.2 overs) | | Flora Davies 53* (71); Emily Carpenter 2/24 (5 overs) |

Leicestershire and Rutland won by 6 wickets
Oakham School Ground, Oakham

- Huntingdonshire won the toss and elected to bat.

6 May 2024
11:00 BST
Scorecard

| Cambridgeshire; 218/9 (50 overs) | v | Norfolk; 176 (44.5 overs) |
| Edie Ayliffe 51 (77); Millie Marsh 3/33 (7 overs) | | Evie Booker 34 (41); Alice Ayliffe 3/26 (9 overs) |

Cambridgeshire won by 42 runs
Fakenham Cricket Club, Fakenham

- Cambridgeshire won the toss and elected to bat.

6 May 2024
11:00 BST
Scorecard

| Northamptonshire; 133 (35.4 overs) | v | Berkshire; 134/6 (37.5 overs) |
| Bethany Ascott 36 (63); Ava Lee 3/27 (8 overs) | | Francesca Clarke 38* (37); Katie Fidler 3/30 (10 overs) |

Berkshire won by 4 wickets
Geddington Sports Ground, Geddington

- Berkshire won the toss and elected to bowl.

6 May 2024
11:00 BST
Scorecard

| Lincolnshire; 150/8 (50 overs) | v | Suffolk; 151/3 (28.3 overs) |
| Alicia Shaw 64 (113); Sophie Hughes 2/14 (7 overs) | | Jess Board 41* (71); Caitlin Phillips 2/28 (5 overs) |

Suffolk won by 7 wickets
Woolpit Cricket Club, Woolpit

- Suffolk won the toss and elected to bowl.

30 June 2024
11:00 BST
Scorecard

| Buckinghamshire; 103 (35 overs) | v | Suffolk; 104/2 (19.5 overs) |
| Tegan Stockdale 41* (56); Isobel Sidhu 3/13 (10 overs) | | Jess Board 32* (50); Amelia Peck 1/18 (3 overs) |

Suffolk won by 8 wickets
Holmer Green Cricket Club, Holmer Green
Umpires: Jon Simmons and Keith Nickless

- Suffolk won the toss and elected to bowl.

30 June 2024
11:00 BST
Scorecard

| Hertfordshire; 157 (33.4 overs) | v | Berkshire; 78 (28.4 overs) |
| Mabel Reid 67 (82); Francesca Clarke 3/10 (5.4 overs) | | Poppy Tulloch 28 (58); Ella Phillips 4/29 (10 overs) |

Hertfordshire won by 79 runs
Finchampstead Leas, Finchampstead

- Hertfordshire won the toss and elected to bat.

30 June 2024
11:00 BST
Scorecard

| Cambridgeshire; 231/5 (50 overs) | v | Huntingdonshire; 91 (23.3 overs) |
| May Busher 59 (82); Clara Thaker 2/10 (5 overs) | | Annabelle Woodward 36 (35); Isabella James 4/7 (6.3 overs) |

Cambridgeshire won by 140 runs
Caldecote Cricket Club, Caldecote

- Huntingdonshire won the toss and elected to bowl.

30 June 2024
11:00 BST
Scorecard

| Leicestershire and Rutland | v | Norfolk |

Leicestershire and Rutland won via walkover
Leicester Ivanhoe Cricket Club, Kirby Muxloe

30 June 2024
11:00 BST
Scorecard

| Lincolnshire; 57 (22.4 overs) | v | Northamptonshire; 59/2 (8.5 overs) |
| Abigail Hannan 15 (47); Patricia Hankins 6/16 (10 overs) | | Hayley Brown 25* (33); Anneka Watson 2/19 (2.5 overs) |

Northamptonshire won by 8 wickets
Geddington Sports Ground, Geddington

- Northamptonshire won the toss and elected to bowl.

9 July 2024
11:00 BST
Scorecard

| Huntingdonshire | v | Berkshire |

Berkshire won via walkover
Ramsey Cricket Club, Ramsey

14 July 2024
11:00 BST
Scorecard

| Northamptonshire; 134 (39.4 overs) | v | Hertfordshire; 138/6 (26 overs) |
| Hayley Brown 40 (60); Amelia Kemp 2/24 (6 overs) | | Gemma Marriott 55 (50); Holly Hammond-Lewis 4/19 (4 overs) |

Hertfordshire won by 4 wickets
Cokenach Cricket Club, Barkway
Umpires: John Sweedy and Hemal Wijesuriya

- Northamptonshire won the toss and elected to bat.

14 July 2024
11:00 BST
Scorecard

| Lincolnshire | v | Cambridgeshire |

Match Abandoned
Holton-le-Clay Cricket Club, Holton-le-Clay

- No toss.
- No play possible due to rain.

14 July 2024
11:00 BST
Scorecard

| Buckinghamshire; 189/6 (40 overs) | v | Norfolk; 112/9 (31.3 overs) |
| Amelia Peck 97 (106); Evie Booker 1/18 (7 overs) | | Emily Dack 32 (48); Amelia Ridgway 5/16 (8 overs) |

Buckinghamshire won by 77 runs
Fakenham Cricket Club, Fakenham

- Match reduced to 40 overs per side due to rain.

14 July 2024
11:00 BST
Scorecard

| Leicestershire and Rutland; 162 (40.1 overs) | v | Suffolk; 129 (39.2 overs) |
| Rebecca Brooker 30 (45); Isobel Sidhu 3/7 (5.1 overs) | | Jess Board 23 (60); D'Nica Roff 3/15 (7 overs) |

Leicestershire and Rutland won by 33 runs
Chilton Fields Cricket Club, Stowmarket

- Suffolk won the toss and elected to bowl.

=== Group 3 ===
21 April 2024
11:00 BST
Scorecard

| Dorset; 99 (32.5 overs) | v | Devon; 100/3 (21 overs) |
| Mollie Joyce 27 (77); JoJo Baylis 3/3 (4.5 overs) | | Regina Lili'i 26* (23); Lizzie Williams 2/9 (2 overs) |

Devon won by 7 wickets
Canford School, Wimborne Minster

- Devon won the toss and elected to bowl.

21 April 2024
11:00 BST
Scorecard

| Gloucestershire; 217 (47.4 overs) | v | Wales; 147 (45.4 overs) |
| Rebecca Halliday 39 (65); Sara Phillips 3/30 (10 overs) | | Libby Thomas 26 (44); Charlie Phillips 3/20 (9 overs) |

Gloucestershire won by 70 runs
Bishopston Cricket Club, Bishopston
Umpires: Matt Jackson and R Scott

- Wales won the toss and elected to bowl.

21 April 2024
11:00 BST
Scorecard

| Cornwall; 183/9 (50 overs) | v | Somerset; 184/3 (35.5 overs) |
| Ellie Mitchell 52 (68); Nicole Harvey 3/19 (8 overs) | | Joleigh Roberts 59* (89); Tegan Smith 1/22 (7 overs) |

Somerset won by 7 wickets
Taunton Vale Sports Club Ground, Taunton

- Somerset won the toss and elected to bowl.

21 April 2024
11:00 BST
Scorecard

| Worcestershire; 322 (46.4 overs) | v | Warwickshire; 87 (25.2 overs) |
| Bryony Gillgrass 151 (129); Ellie Phillips 4/46 (6.4 overs) | | Harriet Shuker 35 (41); Phoebe Brett 2/1 (1 over) |

Worcestershire won by 235 runs
Edgbaston Cricket Ground, Birmingham
Umpires: Clare Gardner and Kelly Wainwright

- Warwickshire won the toss and elected to bowl.

21 April 2024
11:00 BST
Scorecard

| Wiltshire | v | Oxfordshire |

Match Abandoned

- No toss.
- No play possible due to rain.

6 May 2024
11:00 BST

| Wales | v | Warwickshire |

Match Abandoned
Spytty Park, Newport

- No toss.
- No play possible due to rain.

6 May 2024
11:00 BST
Scorecard

| Cornwall; 87 (37 overs) | v | Devon; 88/3 (25.4 overs) |
| Rebecca Odgers 18 (36); Eliza Heard 4/8 (6 overs) | | Rose Ball 27* (36); Lucie Oakley 1/11 (4 overs) |

Devon won by 7 wickets
Thorverton Cricket Club, Thorverton

- Devon won the toss and elected to bowl.

6 May 2024
11:00 BST
Scorecard

| Gloucestershire; 194 (49.3 overs) | v | Wiltshire; 87 (37.2 overs) |
| Bea Ellis 29 (29); Katy Cobb 5/24 (10 overs) | | Flo Sharman 46 (78); Charlie Phillips 5/3 (8.2 overs) |

Gloucestershire won by 107 runs
Dumbleton Cricket Club, Dumbleton
Umpires: Paul Lennon and Ian Young

- Gloucestershire won the toss and elected to bat.

6 May 2024
11:00 BST
Scorecard

| Worcestershire; 228/8 (50 overs) | v | Oxfordshire; 205 (49 overs) |
| Ellie Anderson 67* (86); Chloe Westbury 3/32 (9 overs) | | Carla Wood 39 (102); Phoebe Brett 3/25 (8 overs) |

Worcestershire won by 23 runs
Flagge Meadow, Worcester

- Oxfordshire won the toss and elected to bowl.

30 June 2024
11:00 BST
Scorecard

| Dorset; 108 (34.5 overs) | v | Cornwall; 111/3 (17.1 overs) |
| Megan Bishop 22 (38); Tegan Smith 5/19 (10 overs) | | Caitlin Burnett 36* (55); Emily Roberts 2/28 (6.1 overs) |

Cornwall won by 7 wickets
Veryan Cricket Club, Veryan

- Dorset won the toss and elected to bat.

30 June 2024
11:00 BST
Scorecard

| Oxfordshire; 298/8 (50 overs) | v | Somerset; 287 (49 overs) |
| Aimee Diab 90 (92); Joleigh Roberts 3/33 (5 overs) | | Nicole Harvey 76 (136); Emilia Bartram 4/42 (10 overs) |

Oxfordshire won by 11 runs
Bicester & North Oxford Cricket Club, Bicester
Umpires: Anton Saverimuttu and Colin Muttitt

- Oxfordshire won the toss and elected to bat.

30 June 2024
11:00 BST
Scorecard

| Wales; 256/3 (50 overs) | v | Worcestershire; 52 (17.5 overs) |
| Lauren Parfitt 63 (93); Imogen Hill 1/15 (3 overs); Bryony Gilgrass 1/15 (3 overs) | | Ella Drumm 9 (13); Nicole Reid 3/9 (2.5 overs) |

Wales won by 204 runs
Panteg Cricket Club, Panteg
Umpires: Clive Rees and Ceri Evans

- Wales won the toss and elected to bat.

30 June 2024
11:00 BST
Scorecard

| Warwickshire; 114 (34.5 overs) | v | Gloucestershire; 115/3 (26.3 overs) |
| Beth Charnell 31 (84); Melissa Story 4/19 (6 overs) | | Isobel Patel 74* (98); Laura Crofts 2/22 (6.3 overs) |

Gloucestershire won by 7 wickets
Edgbaston Foundation Ground, Birmingham
Umpires: Mansoor Qureshi and Clare Gardner

- Warwickshire won the toss and elected to bat.

30 June 2024
11:00 BST
Scorecard

| Devon; 270/9 (50 overs) | v | Wiltshire; 113 (33.2 overs) |
| Ruby Davis 64 (58); Katy Cobb 3/29 (10 overs) | | Poppy Walker 55 (58); Katie Donovan 7/10 (8.2 overs) |

Devon won by 157 runs
Royal Wootton Bassett Cricket Club, Royal Wootton Bassett

- Wiltshire won the toss and elected to bowl.

14 July 2024
11:00 BST
Scorecard

| Wales; 246 (47.1 overs) | v | Oxfordshire; 96 (26.5 overs) |
| Emma Godman 59 (81); Maya Barnwell 2/33 (10 overs) | | Emilia Bartram 39 (61); Sara Phillips 3/24 (9 overs) |

Wales won by 150 runs
Witney Mills Cricket Club, Witney
Umpires: Mark Jenkins and Mark Greaves

- Oxfordshire won the toss and elected to field.

14 July 2024
11:00 BST
Scorecard

| Worcestershire; 210 (49.4 overs) | v | Dorset; 104 (38.3 overs) |
| Imogen Hill 52 (55); Lizzie Williams 2/25 (6.4 overs) | | Louisa Heap 22 (43); Ellie Anderson 3/9 (7 overs) |

Worcestershire won by 106 runs
Bromsgrove Cricket Club, Bromsgrove
Umpires: Guy Fenney and Avril Welsh

- Dorset won the toss and elected to bowl.

14 July 2024
11:00 BST
Scorecard

| Cornwall; 154 (44.5 overs) | v | Wiltshire; 158/4 (33.5 overs) |
| Caitlin Burnett 17 (51); Carys Shah 3/15 (2 overs) | | Poppy Walker 40* (63); Tegan Smith 2/28 (10 overs) |

Wiltshire won by 5 wickets
Grampound Road Cricket Club, Grampound Road

- Wiltshire won the toss and elected to bowl.

14 July 2024
11:00 BST
Scorecard

| Devon; 280/6 (50 overs) | v | Warwickshire; 146 (39.1 overs) |
| Emma Corney 82 (97); Emily Churms 3/48 (10 overs) | | Gwenan Davies 27 (45); Ellie Bishop 4/28 (10 overs) |

Devon won by 134 runs
Exeter Cricket Club, Exeter
Umpires: P Mallett and Graham Munday

- Devon won the toss and elected to bat.

14 July 2024
11:00 BST
Scorecard

| Gloucestershire; 289/6 (50 overs) | v | Somerset; 124 (31.3 overs) |
| Chloe Skelton 67 (77); Georgia Tulip 2/34 (5 overs) | | Karla Rose 26 (38); Bhoomika Bhat 3/19 (5 overs) |

Gloucestershire won by 165 runs
County Ground, Taunton

- Gloucestershire won the toss and elected to bat.

4 August 2024
11:00 BST
Scorecard

| Somerset; 137 (36.1 overs) | v | Dorset; 137 (37.1 overs) |
| Nicole Harvey 32 (57); Kelsey Rees 4/21 (9.1 overs) | | Megan Bishop 69* (81); Nicole Harvey 3/31 (10 overs) |

Match Tied
Bournemouth Cricket Club, Bournemouth
Umpires: Derek Russell and Chris Martin

- Dorset won the toss and elected to bowl.
- Match rearranged from 6 May 2024.

=== Group 4 ===
21 April 2024
11:00 BST
Scorecard

| Hampshire; 101 (34.1 overs) | v | Surrey; 102/3 (16.2 overs) |
| Darcey Clarke 21 (44); Priya Khatkar 5/10 (10 overs) | | Charlotte Stubbs 34* (40); Emily Wilson 2/21 (2.1 overs) |

Surrey won by 7 wickets
King Edward VI School, Southampton

- Hampshire won the toss and elected to bat.

21 April 2024
11:00 BST
Scorecard

| Essex; 169 (47.5 overs) | v | Sussex; 170/3 (32.3 overs) |
| Matilda Callaghan 30 (55); Millie Taylor 2/19 (10 overs) | | Alice Macleod 84* (92); Sophia Mitchell 2/18 (4 overs) |

Sussex won by 7 wickets
Felsted School, Felsted

- Sussex won the toss and elected to bowl.

21 April 2024
11:00 BST
Scorecard

| Kent; 198 (49 overs) | v | Middlesex; 138 (39.1 overs) |
| Genevieve Jeer 46 (77); Gayatri Gole 6/30 (10 overs) | | Riva Pindoria 47 (75); Genevieve Jeer 5/11 (3.1 overs) |

Kent won by 60 runs
Polo Farm, Canterbury
Umpires: Mel Juniper and Rehma Chandaria

- Kent won the toss and elected to bat.

6 May 2024
11:00 BST
Scorecard

| Surrey | v | Essex |

Match Abandoned
Chertsey Cricket Club, Chertsey

- No toss.
- No play possible due to rain.

6 May 2024
11:00 BST
Scorecard

| Sussex | v | Kent |

Match Abandoned
Brighton Aldridge Community Academy, Brighton

- No toss.
- No play possible due to rain.

30 June 2024
11:00 BST
Scorecard

| Kent; 291/6 (50 overs) | v | Hampshire; 147 (35.4 overs) |
| Ella Darlington 150* (154); Amy Mills 2/50 (10 overs) | | Finty Trussler 34 (48); Megan Belt 5/17 (10 overs) |

Kent won by 144 runs
King Edward VI School, Southampton
Umpires: Andy Anthony and Scarlett Hale

- Hampshire won the toss and elected to bowl.

30 June 2024
11:00 BST
Scorecard

| Middlesex; 308/5 (50 overs) | v | Essex; 227 (45.1 overs) |
| Saskia Horley 89 (73); Grace Poole 2/63 (10 overs) | | Jasmine Westley 64 (57); Sonali Patel 2/33 (7 overs) |

Middlesex won by 81 runs
Coggeshall Cricket Club, Coggeshall

- Middlesex won the toss and elected to bat.

30 June 2024
11:00 BST
Scorecard

| Sussex; 156 (41.1 overs) | v | Surrey; 142 (32.1 overs) |
| Phoebe Wilkinson 46 (65); Emily Burke 3/20 (6 overs) | | Amy Gordon 36 (27); Millie Taylor 4/32 (10 overs) |

Sussex won by 14 runs
Sports Ground, Woodbridge Road, Guildford
Umpires: Rehma Chandaria and J Buscall

- Surrey won the toss and elected to bowl.

13 July 2024
11:00 BST
Scorecard

| Kent; 134 (43 overs) | v | Essex; 136/1 (23.5 overs) |
| Charlotte Pape 26 (41); Hannah Davis 5/19 (10 overs) | | Matilda Callaghan 66* (80); Charlotte Pape 1/3 (2 overs) |

Essex won by 9 wickets
Sutton Valence School, Maidstone
Umpires: John McBride and Mel Juniper

- Essex won the toss and elected to bowl.

14 July 2024
11:00 BST

| Hampshire; 219 (49.2 overs) | v | Sussex; 220/6 (49 overs) |
| Finty Trussler 58 (95); Daisy Gibb 3/25 (10 overs) | | Lucy Western 77 (139); Eve O'Neill 3/18 (10 overs) |

Sussex won by 4 wickets
Brighton Aldridge Community Academy, Brighton
Umpires: John Holland and Chris Stokes

- Sussex won the toss and elected to bowl.

14 July 2024
11:00 BST
Scorecard

| Middlesex; 94 (29 overs) | v | Surrey; 95/4 (17.3 overs) |
| Georgia Irving 22 (51); Daisy Feast 3/15 (6 overs) | | Kira Chathli 53* (33); Bhavika Gajipra 2/23 (5 overs) |

Surrey won by 6 wickets
Mill Hill School, Mill Hill

- Surrey won the toss and elected to bowl.

1 September 2024
11:00 BST
Scorecard

| Middlesex; 145 (40.4 overs) | v | Hampshire; 149/3 (28.3 overs) |
| Natasha Miles 31 (68); Poppy White 2/9 (4 overs) | | Finty Trussler 62 (66); Bhavika Gajipra 2/36 (7 overs) |

Hampshire won by 7 wickets
Old Elizabethans Cricket Club, Chipping Barnet
Umpires: Jon Simmons and Hemal Wijesuriya

- Hampshire won the toss and elected to bowl.

== Statistics ==
=== Most runs ===
| Player | Team | Matches | Innings | Runs | Average | HS | 100s | 50s |
|---|---|---|---|---|---|---|---|---|
| Bryony Gillgrass | Worcestershire | 4 | 4 | 186 | 46.50 | 151 | 1 | 0 |
| Rebecca Brooker | Leicestershire and Rutland | 3 | 3 | 175 | 58.33 | 145 | 1 | 0 |
| Finty Trussler | Hampshire | 4 | 4 | 173 | 43.25 | 62 | 0 | 2 |
| Ella Darlington | Kent | 3 | 2 | 169 | 169.00 | 150* | 1 | 0 |
| May Busher | Cambridgeshire | 3 | 3 | 143 | 47.67 | 59 | 0 | 1 |

Source: Play-Cricket

=== Most wickets ===
| Player | Team | Overs | Wickets | Average | BBI | 5w |
|---|---|---|---|---|---|---|
| Katie Donovan | Devon | 18.2 | 12 | 4.00 | 7/10 | 1 |
| Georgie Harrison | Staffordshire | 40.0 | 12 | 8.17 | 5/28 | 1 |
| Charlie Phillips | Gloucestershire | 28.2 | 11 | 5.45 | 5/3 | 1 |
| Patricia Hankins | Northamptonshire | 25.0 | 10 | 6.30 | 6/16 | 1 |
| D'Nica Roff | Leicestershire and Rutland | 15.2 | 9 | 3.56 | 6/17 | 1 |

Source: Play-Cricket
