= Essex Women cricket team =

English county cricket team

Essex Women

Personnel
- Captain: Grace Scrivens
- Coach: Stephen Parry
- Overseas player: TBA

Team information
- Founded: Unknown First recorded match: 1949
- Home ground: Various Including Toby Howe Cricket Ground, Billericay

History
- WCC wins: 0
- T20 Cup wins: 0
- Official website: Essex Women

The Essex women's cricket team is the women's representative cricket team for the English historic county of Essex. They play their home games at various grounds across the county, including Toby Howe Cricket Ground, Billericay and Garon Park, Southend-on-Sea. They are captained by Grace Scrivens. In 2019, they played in Division Two of the final season of the Women's County Championship, and have since played in the Women's Twenty20 Cup. They are partnered with the regional side Sunrisers.

== History ==
=== 1949–2000: Early history ===
Essex Women played their first recorded match in 1949, against Buckinghamshire Women. Over the following years, Essex went on to play various one-off matches, most often against local Second XI teams.

=== 2000– : Women's County Championship ===
Essex joined the Women's County Championship in 2001, competing in Division Three, in which they came third, with two victories. They played in the bottom tier of the Championship until 2008, when they were promoted to Division Two. In Division Two, Essex performed strongly, finishing third and second in their first two seasons before being promoted in 2011. In a rain-hit 2012 season, Essex then finished second in Division One, behind Kent. After this, however, Essex fell away, being relegated from Division One in 2014, and then again from Division Two in 2016. They managed to bounce straight back, winning Division 3C in 2017, and playing in Division Two ever since. Meanwhile, in the Women's Twenty20 Cup, Essex have been a volatile side: when the tournament was regionalised in its early years, Essex bounced between Divisions One and Two of the South section. Since, they briefly fell into Division 3 in 2018, but apart from this have played in Division 2, achieving their best finish of 3rd in 2015.

The side began competing in the Women's London Championship in 2020. In 2021, they competed in the South East Group of the Twenty20 Cup, but finished bottom. They topped their group in the 2022 Women's Twenty20 Cup, but lost to Suffolk in the group final. Essex finished third in their group in the 2023 Women's Twenty20 Cup, but won the Women's London Championship, winning all four of their matches. In 2024, the side finished 4th in their group in the Twenty20 Cup and 4th in their group in the new ECB Women's County One-Day tournament.

== Players ==
=== Current squad ===
- No. denotes the player's squad number, as worn on the back of their shirt.
- ‡ denotes players with international caps.

No.	Name	Nationality	Birth date	Batting style	Bowling style	Notes
Batters
4	Flo Miller	England	26 February 2004 (age 22)	Right-handed	Right-arm medium	
6	Cordelia Griffith	England	19 September 1995 (age 31)	Right-handed	Right-arm medium	
25	Liberty Heap	England	16 September 2003 (age 23)	Right-handed	Right-arm off break	
All-rounders
9	Jodi Grewcock ‡	England	30 November 2004 (age 21)	Left-handed	Right-arm leg break	
14	Jo Gardner	England	25 March 1997 (age 29)	Right-handed	Right-arm off break	
16	Sophia Smale	Wales	8 December 2004 (age 21)	Right-handed	Slow left-arm orthodox	
29	Grace Scrivens	England	10 November 2003 (age 22)	Left-handed	Right-arm off break	Club captain
Wicket-keepers
17	Amara Carr	England	17 April 1994 (age 32)	Right-handed	—	
Bowlers
8	Esmae MacGregor	England	31 July 2004 (age 22)	Right-handed	Right-arm medium	
12	Clara Thaker	England	19 October 2008 (age 17)	Right-handed	Right-arm medium	
18	Abtaha Maqsood ‡	Scotland	11 June 1999 (age 27)	Right-handed	Right-arm leg break	
22	Sophie Munro	England	31 August 2001 (age 25)	Right-handed	Right-arm medium	
Source: Updated: 1 October 2026

=== Notable players ===
Players who have played for Essex and played internationally are listed below, in order of first international appearance (given in brackets):

- (New Zealand) Lucy Doolan (2008)
- (New Zealand) Sian Ruck (2009)
- (England) Beth MacGregor (2010)
- (England) Beth Langston (2013)
- (Australia) Kristen Beams (2014)
- (New Zealand) Leigh Kasperek (2015)
- (Ireland) Catherine Dalton (2015)
- (Netherlands) Sterre Kalis (2018)
- (Scotland) Abtaha Maqsood (2018)
- (Hong Kong) Yasmin Daswani (2019)
- (England) Mady Villiers (2019)
- (Australia) Heather Graham (2019)
- (Germany) Sharanya Sadarangani (2020)
- (England) Jodi Grewcock (2026)

== Seasons ==
=== Women's County Championship ===
Season	Division	League standings								Notes
Season	Division	P	W	L	T	A/C	BP	Pts	Pos	Notes
2001	Division 3	4	2	2	0	0	31.5	55.5	3rd	
2002	Division 3	5	1	2	0	2	21.5	55.5	4th	
2003	Division 3	5	0	3	1	1	25	42	5th	
2004	County Challenge Cup G2	2	1	1	0	0	14.5	26	3rd	
2005	County Challenge Cup G2	3	1	2	0	0	25.5	37.5	3rd	
2006	County Challenge Cup G2	3	2	1	0	0	4	44	1st	Lost promotion playoff
2007	County Challenge Cup Div A	6	3	1	0	2	4	99	2nd	
2008	Division 4	6	6	0	0	0	0	120	1st	Promoted
2009	Division 2	10	4	6	0	0	33	103	3rd	
2010	Division 2	10	8	2	0	0	63	143	2nd	
2011	Division 2	10	7	2	0	1	61	131	1st	Promoted
2012	Division 1	8	2	0	0	6	16	36	2nd	
2013	Division 1	8	2	5	0	1	32	52	8th	
2014	Division 1	8	1	5	0	2	20	30	9th	Relegated
2015	Division 2	8	3	4	0	1	39	69	5th	
2016	Division 2	7	0	7	0	0	32	32	8th	Relegated
2017	Division 3C	5	5	0	0	0	37	87	1st	Promoted
2018	Division 2	7	3	3	0	1	25	55	6th	
2019	Division 2	7	5	2	0	0	44	94	3rd	

=== Women's Twenty20 Cup ===
Season	Division	League standings								Notes
Season	Division	P	W	L	T	A/C	NRR	Pts	Pos	Notes
2009	Division 3	3	2	0	0	1	+0.61	5	1st	
2010	Division S&W 1	3	2	1	0	0	−0.75	4	2nd	
2011	Division S1	3	0	3	0	0	−1.38	0	4th	Relegated
2012	Division S2	3	3	0	0	0	+6.17	6	1st	Promoted
2013	Division S1	3	0	3	0	0	−2.70	0	4th	
2014	Division 1B	4	0	4	0	0	−3.44	0	9th	Relegated
2015	Division 2	8	5	3	0	0	+0.31	20	3rd	
2016	Division 2	7	3	3	0	1	+0.55	13	5th	
2017	Division 2	8	1	6	0	1	−0.79	5	9th	Relegated
2018	Division 3C	8	7	1	0	0	+3.23	28	1st	Promoted
2019	Division 2	8	4	2	0	2	−0.07	18	5th	
2021	South East	8	0	6	0	2	−1.54	2	6th	
2022	Group 4	6	6	0	0	0	+3.92	24	1st	Lost final
2023	Group 7	6	2	1	0	3	+0.54	11	3rd	
2024	Group 3	8	3	4	0	1	+0.27	63	4th	

=== ECB Women's County One-Day ===
Season	Group	League standings								Notes
Season	Group	P	W	L	T	A/C	BP	Pts	Pos	Notes
2024	Group 4	4	1	2	0	1	1	6	4th	

== See also ==
- Essex County Cricket Club
- Sunrisers (women's cricket)
