= Women's Twenty20 Cup =

English cricket tournament

- Administrator: ECB
- Format: Twenty20
- First edition: 2009
- Latest edition: 2024
- Tournament format: Regional groups
- Number of teams: 35
- Current champion: Derbyshire (1st title)
- Most successful: Kent (3 titles)

The Women's Twenty20 Cup, known for sponsorship reasons as the Vitality Women's County T20, is a women's Twenty20 cricket competition organised by the England and Wales Cricket Board. Until the end of the 2019 season, teams were organised in tiered divisions, with a national winner; since, teams have been organised into regional groups.

The competition began in 2009 and now features 35 teams, drawn mainly from the historic counties of England, plus Wales and Scotland. Until 2019, the competition operated alongside the Women's County Championship, but after a restructuring in women's domestic cricket in 2020, between 2021 and 2023 it was the only official tournament featuring county sides, with regional teams competing in new 50-over, Twenty20 and The Hundred competitions.

Teams competed in regional groups, with no national finals, between 2021 and 2023. National finals returned in 2024, with Derbyshire winning the title. The most successful side in the history of the competition is Kent, with 3 wins.

== History ==
The Women's Twenty20 Cup began in 2009, with teams competing in eight tiered divisions of four. Surrey were the inaugural Division 1 champions. Overall, eight teams have won the tournament, with Kent being the most successful side, winning the tournament three times, in 2011, 2013 and 2016. Berkshire reached the final of the competition three times in a row between 2010 and 2012, but only managed to win the tournament in 2010. After the 2019 season, the 50-over Women's County Championship was ended, in favour of a regionalised structure for domestic women's cricket. However, the Twenty20 Cup was allowed to continue, with central funding from the ECB, until at least 2021, with counties effectively acting as "feeder" teams to the new regional sides. However, the 2020 edition of the tournament was postponed and eventually cancelled due to the COVID-19 pandemic. The tournament returned for 2021, with a regional format, and is set to continue in 2022. As the tournament now operates on a regional structure, with no overall winner, Warwickshire, who won in 2019, were the final national champions.

The competition formed the women's county structure with the 50-over Women's County Championship between 2009 and 2019. It has also ran alongside composite and regional tournaments such as the Super Fours, the Women's Cricket Super League and, currently, the Rachael Heyhoe Flint Trophy and the Charlotte Edwards Cup. Following the ending of the Women's County Championship in 2019, various counties set up regional tournaments such as the Women's London Championship and the East of England Women's County Championship; however, the Twenty20 Cup was the only official county-based competition in England between 2021 and 2023. The ECB Women's County One-Day was introduced in 2024 as a second official county competition.

== Structure ==
The Women's Twenty20 Cup has varying formats and number of teams over its history. In 2009, 32 teams took part divided into eight tiered divisions of four, with the winners of Division 1 being crowned the Champions. In 2010, teams were divided into three regions (Midlands & North, South and South & West), and then further divided into divisions within their regions. The best-performing teams across the three Division Ones progressed to Finals Day. This format was retained until the end of the 2013 season.

In 2014, teams were divided into four divisions, which were further divided into regional groups of three (and one group of four) each. Each team then progressed into a second group stage to play against teams that finished in the same position in the first round, with the winner of Round 2 Group 1A being crowned the Champions. From 2015, teams were divided into four divisions with promotion and relegation, with the winner of Division 1 winning the tournament. In 2017, the number of division was reduced to three, with this format retained until the end of the 2019 season.

The tournament was cancelled in 2020 due to the COVID-19 pandemic. In 2021, due to ongoing concerns with the pandemic, as well as limited travel costs, the tournament was organised on a regional basis, with six groups of six, and no overall national winner. In 2022 and 2023, the tournament remained organised on a regional basis, with teams now divided into eight groups. In 2024, teams were again organised on a regional basis into four groups, but with the four group winners progressing to a national finals group.

=== Current teams ===
In 2024, the 35 teams competed in the tournament were organised into 4 regional groups. The teams were divided as follows:

Group 1	Cumbria	Derbyshire	Lancashire	North East Warriors	Nottinghamshire	Scotland	Staffordshire	Yorkshire	
Group 2	Cambridgeshire	Huntingdonshire	Leicestershire and Rutland	Lincolnshire	Norfolk	Northamptonshire	Shropshire	Warwickshire	Worcestershire
Group 3	Berkshire	Buckinghamshire	Essex	Hertfordshire	Kent	Middlesex	Suffolk	Surrey	Sussex
Group 4	Cornwall	Devon	Dorset	Gloucestershire	Hampshire	Oxfordshire	Somerset	Wales	Wiltshire

=== Former teams ===
Team	Span	Notes
Bedfordshire	2011–2014	
Cambridgeshire and Huntingdonshire	2009–2013	Split into Cambridgeshire and Huntingdonshire
Cheshire	2009–2019	
Durham	2009–2019	Combined with Northumberland to form North East Warriors
Ireland	2012; 2014–2015	
Netherlands	2011–2015	
North Representative XI	2021–2022	
Northumberland	2009–2018	Combined with Durham to form North East Warriors

== Roll of Honour ==
Season	Winner	Runner-up	Leading run-scorer	Leading wicket-taker	Refs
2009	Surrey	Kent	Ebony Rainford-Brent (Surrey) 90	Jodie Dibble (Devon); Abbi Aitken (Scotland) 6	
2010	Berkshire	Yorkshire	Charlotte Edwards (Kent) 229	Isa Guha (Berkshire) 11	
2011	Kent	Berkshire	Danni Wyatt (Staffordshire) 202	Alice Davidson-Richards (Kent) 12	
2012	Sussex	Berkshire	Heather Knight (Berkshire) 284	Georgia Elwiss (Sussex) 12	
2013	Kent	Sussex	Fran Wilson (Somerset) 290	Megan Belt (Kent) 9	
2014	Nottinghamshire	Middlesex	Clare Shillington (Ireland) 242	Erin Bermingham (Kent) 15	
2015	Sussex	Yorkshire	Danni Wyatt (Nottinghamshire) 287	Megan Fairclough (Lancashire); Jenny Gunn (Nottinghamshire) 15	
2016	Kent	Warwickshire	Laura Newton (Cheshire) 272	Nicole Richards (Somerset) 15	
2017	Lancashire	Middlesex	Jodie Dibble (Nottinghamshire) 260	Clare Boycott (Worcestershire) 14	
2018	Middlesex	Sussex	Kezia Hassall (Hampshire) 311	Providence Cowdrill (Hampshire); Rebecca Silk (Devon) 15	
2019	Warwickshire	Lancashire	Sophie Luff (Somerset) 316	Laura Ellison (Durham) 15	
2020	Cancelled (Note: Due to the COVID-19 pandemic.)				
2021	No overall winner (Note: Hertfordshire, Nottinghamshire, Lancashire, Kent, Gloucestershire and Somerset won their respective groups.)		Imogen Sidhu (Suffolk) 293	Finty Trussler (Hampshire) 16	
2022	No overall winner (Note: Lancashire, Worcestershire, Warwickshire, Suffolk, Leicestershire and Rutland, Sussex, Middlesex and Devon won their respective groups.)		Georgie Boyce (Lancashire) 306	Anisha Patel (Warwickshire) 15	
2023	No overall winner (Note: Lancashire, Warwickshire, Gloucestershire, Sussex, Northamptonshire and Somerset won their respective groups. Middlesex and Kent shared their group title due to rain on their group Finals Day. One group winner was not determined, as the Group 4 Finals Day was abandoned due to rain.)		Gemma Marriott (Hertfordshire) 203	Bhoomika Bhat (Gloucestershire); Rebecca Tyson (Hertfordshire) 12	
2024	Derbyshire	Hertfordshire	Lara Shaw (Derbyshire) 306	Emma Thatcher (Derbyshire) 18	

== See also ==
- Australian Women's Twenty20 Cup
- Women's Big Bash League
- Women's Premier League
