= 2007 Women's County Championship =

- Administrator: England and Wales Cricket Board
- Cricket format: 50 over
- Tournament format: League system
- Champions: Kent (2nd title)
- Participants: 32
- Most runs: Emily Drumm (222)
- Most wickets: Lynsey Askew (13)

The 2007 Women's County One-Day Championship was the 11th cricket Women's County Championship season. It ran from May to August and saw 30 county teams and teams representing Scotland and Wales compete in a series of divisions. Kent Women won the County Championship as winners of the top division, achieving their second title in two seasons.

== Competition format ==
Teams played matches within a series of divisions with the winners of the top division being crowned County Champions. Matches were played using a one day format with 50 overs per side.

The championship works on a points system with positions within the divisions being based on the total points. Points were awarded as follows:

Win: 25 points.
Tie: 15 points.
Loss: Bonus points.
No Result: 4 points.
Abandoned: 10 points.

Up to four batting and four bowling points were available to the losing team only, or both teams in an incomplete match.

== Teams ==
The 2007 Championship was divided into two tiers: the County Championship and the County Challenge Cup. The County Championship consisted of three divisions of four teams, whilst the Challenge Cup consisted of five groups of four teams, with Division A as the top tier and Groups 1 to 4 as equal tiers below. The winner of Division A of the Challenge Cup were promoted to the County Championship.

Teams in the County Championship and Division A of the Challenge Cup played each other twice, whilst teams in Groups 1 to 4 of the Challenge Cup played each other once.

=== County Championship ===
Division One	Kent	Lancashire	Nottinghamshire	Sussex
Division Two	Berkshire	Somerset	Surrey	Yorkshire
Division Three	Cheshire	Middlesex	Staffordshire	Warwickshire

=== County Challenge Cup ===
Division A	Derbyshire	Essex	Hampshire	Northamptonshire
Group 1	Cornwall	Devon	Dorset	Wiltshire
Group 2	Gloucestershire	Oxfordshire	Wales	Worcestershire
Group 3	Hertfordshire	Leicestershire	Norfolk	Suffolk
Group 4	Cumbria	Durham	Northumberland	Scotland

== County Championship ==
=== Division One ===
Team	Pld	W	L	T	A	Bat	Bowl	Ded	Pts
Kent (C)	6	5	0	0	1	0	0	0	135
Sussex	6	4	1	0	1	1	1	0	112
Nottinghamshire	6	1	4	0	1	3	9	0	47
Lancashire (R)	6	0	5	0	1	2	14	0	26

Source: Cricket Archive

=== Division Two ===
Team	Pld	W	L	T	A	Bat	Bowl	Ded	Pts
Berkshire (P)	6	4	1	0	1	0	2	0	112
Surrey	6	3	2	0	1	0	6	0	91
Somerset	6	3	2	0	1	0	4	0	89
Yorkshire (R)	6	0	5	0	1	5	9	0	24

Source: Cricket Archive

=== Division Three ===
Team	Pld	W	L	T	A	Bat	Bowl	Ded	Pts
Warwickshire (P)	6	3	0	0	3	0	0	0	105
Middlesex	6	2	2	0	2	3	5	0	78
Cheshire	6	1	2	0	3	0	7	0	62
Staffordshire (R)	6	1	3	0	2	1	7	0	53

Source: Cricket Archive

== County Challenge Cup ==
=== Division A ===
Team	Pld	W	L	T	A	Bat	Bowl	Ded	Pts
Derbyshire (P)	6	3	0	0	3	0	0	0	105
Essex	6	3	1	0	2	2	2	0	99
Hampshire	6	1	3	0	2	1	5	0	51
Northamptonshire (R)	6	0	3	0	3	2	3	0	35

Source: Cricket Archive

=== Group 1 ===
Team	Pld	W	L	T	A	Bat	Bowl	Ded	Pts
Devon (PO)	3	2	0	0	1	3	0	0	63
Dorset	3	2	1	0	0	0	1	0	51
Cornwall	3	1	1	0	1	0	4	0	39
Wiltshire	3	0	3	0	0	0	3	0	3

Source: Cricket Archive

=== Group 2 ===
Team	Pld	W	L	T	A	Bat	Bowl	Ded	Pts
Worcestershire (Note: Worcestershire were promoted to Division Four (which replaced Division A) for 2008 after winning the Challenge Cup play-off group. The full results and table for this play-off are unrecorded.) (P)	3	2	0	0	1	0	0	0	60
Wales	3	1	1	0	1	0	4	0	39
Gloucestershire	3	1	1	0	1	0	3	0	38
Oxfordshire	3	0	2	0	1	0	4	0	14

Source: Cricket Archive

=== Group 3 ===
Team	Pld	W	L	T	A	Bat	Bowl	Ded	Pts
Hertfordshire (PO)	3	2	0	0	1	0	0	0	60
Leicestershire	3	2	0	0	1	0	0	0	60
Norfolk	3	1	2	0	0	2	4	0	31
Suffolk	3	0	3	0	0	1	3	0	4

Source: Cricket Archive

=== Group 4 ===
Team	Pld	W	L	T	A	Bat	Bowl	Ded	Pts
Scotland (PO)	3	3	0	0	0	0	0	0	75
Durham	3	1	1	0	1	0	4	0	39
Cumbria	3	1	2	0	0	2	5	0	32
Northumberland	3	0	2	0	1	1	5	0	16

Source: Cricket Archive

== Statistics ==
=== Most runs ===
Player	Team	Matches	Innings	Runs	Average	HS	100s	50s
Emily Drumm	Kent	4	4	222	111.00	65*	0	4
Claire Taylor	Berkshire	5	5	211	52.75	59	0	2
Jenny Gunn	Nottinghamshire	5	5	160	32.00	77	0	1
Elwyn Campbell	Somerset	5	5	149	29.80	55	0	1
Lydia Greenway	Kent	5	5	130	26.00	53	0	1

Source: CricketArchive

=== Most wickets ===
Player	Team	Balls	Wickets	Average	BBI	5w
Lynsey Askew	Kent	259	13	8.00	5/5	1
Sarah Bartlett	Middlesex	228	12	7.66	5/9	1
Kate Cross	Lancashire	269	12	9.25	4/17	0
Sarah Clarke	Surrey	252	12	11.16	3/26	0
Isa Guha	Berkshire	227	11	7.54	4/13	0

Source: CricketArchive
