= Bethan Gammon =

Welsh cricketer

Personal information
- Full name: Bethan Nia Gammon
- Born: 10 March 2001 (age 25); Pontypridd, Wales
- Batting: Right-handed
- Role: Wicket-keeper

Domestic team information
- Years: Team
- 2018–present: Wales
- 2021–2022: Western Storm
- 2024: The Blaze

Career statistics
Competition	WLA	WT20
Matches	8	28
Runs scored	168	566
Batting average	24.00	35.37
100s/50s	0/1	0/3
Top score	51*	73
Catches/stumpings	2/–	5/–
- Source: CricketArchive, 19 October 2024

Bethan Nia Gammon (born 10 March 2001) is a Welsh cricketer who currently plays for Wales. She plays as a wicket-keeper and right-handed batter. She has previously played for Western Storm and The Blaze.

== Early life ==
Gammon was born on 10 March 2001 in Pontypridd, Wales. She was the Welsh Athletics age group champion at both hammer throw and discus, and represented Wales in the hammer throw at the schools international in Dublin in 2017.

== Domestic career ==
Gammon made her county debut in 2018, for Wales against Cheshire. She only played one more match that season, and did not bat or keep wicket in either. The following season, 2019, Gammon played four matches, with a high score of 14. She played four matches in the 2021 Women's Twenty20 Cup, with a high score of 20. In 2022, she was Wales' second-highest run-scorer in the 2022 Women's Twenty20 Cup with 159 runs, and made her maiden Twenty20 half-century, scoring 50 against Warwickshire. She was Wales' leading run-scorer in the 2023 Women's Twenty20 Cup, with 126 runs at an average of 63.00. During the 2023 West Midlands Regional Cup, she took 5/20 against Warwickshire.

In 2021, Gammon was named in the Western Storm squad for the upcoming season. She made her Storm debut on 28 August 2021, in a Charlotte Edwards Cup match against Northern Diamonds, and went on to play two more matches for the side that season. She was again in the Western Storm squad in 2022, but did not play a match. She joined The Blaze ahead of the 2024 season. She played four matches for The Blaze that season, all in the Rachael Heyhoe Flint Trophy, scoring 66 runs.

== International career ==
Gammon was selected for the NCAA England XI that won the inaugural Women's European Cricket Championship in Malaga in December 2023, playing Netherlands in the final. Gammon was awarded Player of the Final, scoring 26* off 7 balls. Gammon was again a member of the NCAA england XI that successfully defended the title in 2024. She finished with a tournament leading batting average of 180
