= Gabrielle Basketter =

English cricketer

Personal information
- Full name: Gabrielle Amber Basketter
- Born: 12 April 1993 (age 33); Portsmouth, England
- Batting: Right-handed
- Bowling: Right-arm off break
- Role: All-rounder

Domestic team information
- Years: Team
- 2009–2012: Hampshire
- 2013–2022: Wales
- 2022: Central Sparks
- 2023–present: Worcestershire

Career statistics
Competition	WLA	WT20
Matches	63	61
Runs scored	1,340	1,142
Batting average	22.71	25.95
100s/50s	1/6	1/5
Top score	107*	100*
Balls bowled	1,690	932
Wickets	48	44
Bowling average	20.52	17.95
5 wickets in innings	0	0
10 wickets in match	0	0
Best bowling	4/13	4/11
Catches/stumpings	12/–	14/–
- Source: CricketArchive, 12 September 2022

Gabrielle Amber Basketter (born 12 April 1993) is an English cricketer who currently plays for Worcestershire. An all-rounder, she is a right-handed batter and right-arm off break bowler. She has previously played for Hampshire, Wales and Central Sparks.

== Early life ==
Basketter was born on 12 April 1993 in Portsmouth. She also works as Women & Girls' Officer for Warwickshire Cricket Board.

== Domestic career ==
Basketter made her county debut in 2009, for Hampshire against Devon. She was Hampshire's leading run-scorer in the 2011 Women's County Championship, with 215 runs including two half-centuries.

Basketter moved to Wales ahead of the 2013 season, scoring her first half-century for her new side in her third match, against Cheshire. In 2014, she took her career-best Twenty20 bowling figures, with 4/11 in her side's 6 run victory over Devon. She took her List A best bowling figures in 2015, with 4/13 against Durham. In 2017, she scored her maiden List A century, scoring 107* against Somerset, and ended the County Championship as her side's leading run-scorer, with 221 runs. In the 2017 Women's Twenty20 Cup, she was the second-highest run-scorer across the whole competition, with 253 runs at an average of 50.60. The following season, she was the third-highest run-scorer in the same competition, with 274 runs at an average of 45.66, including her maiden Twenty20 century, 100* from 67 balls against Northamptonshire. In 2022, she top-scored with 46 as Wales beat eventual group winners Warwickshire in the Women's Twenty20 Cup. She also top-scored in the final of that year's West Midlands Regional Cup, scoring 35 as Wales won the competition.

In September 2022, Basketter was added to the Central Sparks squad. She made her debut for the side on 11 September, against South East Stars in the Rachael Heyhoe Flint Trophy.
