= Lauren Griffiths =

England cricketer

Personal information
- Full name: Lauren Patricia Griffiths
- Born: 14 February 1987 (age 39); Chester, Cheshire, England
- Batting: Right-handed
- Role: Wicket-keeper

International information
- National side: England (2010–2011)
- Only Test (cap 147): 22 January 2011 v Australia
- ODI debut (cap 117): 15 November 2010 v Sri Lanka
- Last ODI: 9 January 2011 v Australia
- T20I debut (cap 30): 12 January 2011 v Australia
- Last T20I: 18 January 2011 v Australia

Domestic team information
- Years: Team
- 2002–2013: Cheshire
- 2014–2019: Kent
- 2016: Loughborough Lightning

Career statistics
Competition	WTest	WODI	WT20I	WLA
Matches	1	5	5	110
Runs scored	3	11	10	893
Batting average	3.00	11.00	5.00	11.30
100s/50s	0/0	0/0	0/0	0/2
Top score	3	7	8	59
Balls bowled	–	–	–	120
Wickets	–	–	–	6
Bowling average	–	–	–	9.00
5 wickets in innings	–	–	–	0
10 wickets in match	–	–	–	0
Best bowling	–	–	–	3/25
Catches/stumpings	2/0	4/1	0/0	86/–
- Source: CricketArchive, 16 January 2021

Lauren Patricia Griffiths (born 14 February 1987) is an English former cricketer who played as a wicket-keeper and right-handed batter. She represented England in all three formats of the game, playing 1 Test match, 5 One Day Internationals and 5 Twenty20 Internationals. She played domestic cricket for Kent and Cheshire.

== Early life ==
Griffiths was born on 14 February 1987 in Chester, Cheshire.

== Domestic career ==
In county cricket, Griffiths played for Cheshire from 2002 to 2013, captaining them from 2007 to 2011. On 23 June 2013 she made her county high score of 59 and took her best bowling figures of 3 wickets for 25 runs in a County Championship match against Devon.

Griffiths moved to Kent ahead of the 2014 season. She helped the county win the County Championship in 2014, 2016 and 2019 as well as the Twenty20 Cup in 2016. She formally collected the 2019 County Championship trophy on behalf of the Kent team in a ceremony at the House of Lords on 3 March 2020.

She also played for Sapphires in the now-defunct Super Fours competition.

Griffiths was named in the Loughborough Lightning squad for the 2016 Women's Cricket Super League but she did not play a match.

== International career ==
At the age of 21, Griffiths received her first England call-up for the 2009 Women's Cricket World Cup. England won the tournament but she did not feature in any matches.

Griffiths made her England debut in a One Day International against Sri Lanka at Nondescripts Cricket Club Ground, Colombo on 15 November 2010, scoring seven runs and taking one catch as England won by 5 runs. She played in four further One Day Internationals, all in late 2010 and early 2011.

Griffiths made her Twenty20 International debut against Australia at Adelaide Oval on 12 January 2011. She played in all five Twenty20 Internationals of the series but did not appear in any future matches in the format.

Griffiths' sole Test match was the Ashes Test against Australia at Bankstown Oval, Sydney on 22 January 2011. Australia won by 7 wickets to regain the Ashes. This was her last match for England.
