= 2013 Women's Twenty20 Cup =

Cricket tournament

- Administrator(s): England and Wales Cricket Board
- Cricket format: Twenty20
- Tournament format(s): League system
- Champions: Kent (2nd title)
- Participants: 33
- Most runs: Fran Wilson (290)
- Most wickets: Megan Belt (9)

The 2013 Women's Twenty20 Cup was the 5th cricket Women's Twenty20 Cup tournament. It took place between July and September, with 33 teams taking part: 31 county teams plus Wales and the Netherlands. Kent Women won the Twenty20 Cup, beating Sussex Women in the final, achieving their second title. The tournament ran alongside the 50-over 2013 Women's County Championship.

== Competition format ==
Teams played matches within a series of regionalised divisions, with the winners of the top divisions progressing to semi-finals and a final. Matches were played using a Twenty20 format.

The divisions worked on a points system with positions within the divisions being based on the total points. Points were awarded as follows:

Win: 4 points.
Tie: 2 points.
Loss: 0 points.
Abandoned/Cancelled: 1 point.

== Teams ==
The 2013 Women's Twenty20 Cup was divided into three regions: Midlands & North, South and South & West. Each region was further divided into divisions: Midlands & North with four, South with three and South & West with two. Teams in each division played each other once, and then the top two played in a Division Final and bottom two in a 3rd-place play-off. The winners of each Division 1, and the best-performing second-place team, progressed to the semi-finals.

=== Midlands & North ===
Division One	Nottinghamshire	Staffordshire	Worcestershire	Yorkshire
Division Two	Lancashire	Netherlands	Warwickshire	
Division Three	Cheshire	Gloucestershire	Leicestershire and Rutland	
Division Four	Cumbria	Derbyshire	Northumberland	Oxfordshire

=== South ===
Division One	Essex	Kent	Middlesex	Sussex
Division Two	Hampshire	Hertfordshire	Surrey	Suffolk
Division Three	Bedfordshire	Cambridgeshire and Huntingdonshire	Norfolk	

=== South & West ===
Division One	Berkshire	Cornwall	Somerset	Wales
Division Two	Buckinghamshire	Devon	Dorset	Wiltshire

== Midlands & North ==
=== Division 1 ===
==== Group stage ====
Team	Pld	W	L	T	A	C	NRR	Ded	Pts
Nottinghamshire (Q)	3	3	0	0	0	0	+2.57	0	12
Yorkshire	3	2	1	0	0	0	+0.09	0	8
Worcestershire	3	1	2	0	0	0	–0.87	0	4
Staffordshire	3	0	3	0	0	0	–1.76	0	0

Source: ECB Women's Twenty20 Cup

==== Final ====
23 July 2013
Scorecard

Nottinghamshire; 182/3 (20 overs)	v	Yorkshire; 46 (9.2 overs)
Danni Wyatt 102 (63); Aimee Simms 2/43 (4 overs)		Lauren Winfield 18 (9); Lucy Maxwell 3/1 (1.2 overs)

Nottinghamshire won by 136 runs
Arlington Avenue, Leamington Spa
Umpires: Sue Haynes and Vanessa Holliday

- Yorkshire won the toss and elected to field.
- Nottinghamshire progress to the semi-finals.

=== Division 2 ===
Team	Pld	W	L	T	A	C	NRR	Ded	Pts
Warwickshire	2	2	0	0	0	0	+6.26	0	8
Lancashire	2	0	1	0	0	1	−4.85	0	1
Netherlands	2	0	1	0	0	1	–7.70	0	1

Source: ECB Women's Twenty20 Cup

=== Division 3 ===
Team	Pld	W	L	T	A	C	NRR	Ded	Pts
Leicestershire	2	1	0	0	1	0	+2.22	0	5
Gloucestershire	2	1	1	0	0	0	−0.49	0	4
Cheshire	2	0	1	0	1	0	–0.73	0	1

Source: ECB Women's Twenty20 Cup

=== Division 4 ===
Team	Pld	W	L	T	A	C	NRR	Ded	Pts
Derbyshire	3	3	0	0	0	0	+1.69	0	12
Cumbria	3	1	2	0	0	0	−0.35	0	4
Northumberland	3	1	2	0	0	0	–0.69	0	4
Oxfordshire	3	1	2	0	0	0	–0.72	0	4

Source: ECB Women's Twenty20 Cup

== South ==
=== Division 1 ===
==== Group stage ====
Team	Pld	W	L	T	A	C	NRR	Ded	Pts
Sussex (Q)	3	2	1	0	0	0	+1.53	0	8
Kent (Q)	3	2	1	0	0	0	+0.99	0	8
Middlesex	3	2	1	0	0	0	+0.34	0	8
Essex	3	0	3	0	0	0	–2.70	0	0

Source: ECB Women's Twenty20 Cup

==== Final ====
23 July 2013
Scorecard

Kent; 112/5 (20 overs)	v	Sussex; 114/6 (20 overs)
Tammy Beaumont 55 (−); Freya Davies 2/11 (4 overs)		Alexia Walker 52 (42); Tash Farrant 2/18 (4 overs)

Sussex won by 2 runs
Wellington College, Crowthorne

- Kent won the toss and elected to field.
- Sussex and Kent progress to the semi-finals.

=== Division 2 ===
Team	Pld	W	L	T	A	C	NRR	Ded	Pts
Surrey	3	3	0	0	0	0	+2.05	0	12
Hampshire	3	2	1	0	0	0	+0.41	0	8
Hertfordshire	3	1	2	0	1	0	+0.27	0	4
Suffolk	3	0	3	0	0	0	–2.76	0	0

Source: ECB Women's Twenty20 Cup

=== Division 3 ===
Team	Pld	W	L	T	A	C	NRR	Ded	Pts
Bedfordshire	2	2	0	0	0	0	+1.38	0	8
Norfolk	2	1	1	0	0	0	+0.15	0	4
Cambridgeshire and Huntingdonshire	2	0	2	0	0	0	–1.40	0	0

Source: ECB Women's Twenty20 Cup

== South & West ==
=== Division 1 ===
==== Group stage ====
Team	Pld	W	L	T	A	C	NRR	Ded	Pts
Somerset	3	3	0	0	0	0	+5.78	0	12
Berkshire (Q)	3	2	1	0	0	0	+2.22	0	8
Wales	3	1	2	0	0	0	−3.05	0	4
Cornwall	3	0	3	0	0	0	–4.50	0	0

Source: ECB Women's Twenty20 Cup

==== Final ====
23 July 2013
Scorecard

Berkshire; 147/6 (20 overs)	v	Somerset; 144/5 (20 overs)
Heather Knight 43 (34); Jenny Withers 2/16 (4 overs)		Fran Wilson 48 (34); Heather Knight 3/23 (4 overs)

Berkshire won by 3 runs
Spytty Park, Newport
Umpires: Clive Poulton and Darren Turl

- Berkshire won the toss and elected to bat.
- Berkshire progress to the semi-finals.

=== Division 2 ===
Team	Pld	W	L	T	A	C	NRR	Ded	Pts
Devon	3	3	0	0	0	0	+4.92	0	12
Buckinghamshire	3	2	1	0	0	0	+0.30	0	8
Dorset	3	1	2	0	1	0	−2.47	0	4
Wiltshire	3	0	3	0	0	0	–2.55	0	0

Source: ECB Women's Twenty20 Cup

== Knock-Out Stage ==
=== Semi-finals ===
7 September 2013
Scorecard

Kent; 131/4 (20 overs)	v	Nottinghamshire; 123/7 (20 overs)
Tammy Beaumont 47 (46); Danni Wyatt 3/28 (4 overs)		Jane Smit 59 (53); Megan Belt 3/18 (4 overs)

Kent won by 8 runs
Spen Cama Memorial Ground, Fulking
Umpires: John Booker and Trevor Cox

- Nottinghamshire won the toss and elected to field.
- Kent progress to the final.

7 September 2013
Scorecard

Sussex; 63/2 (13.2 overs)	v	Berkshire; 59/7 (15 overs)
Arran Brindle 17* (19); Alice Macleod 1/8 (3 overs)		Alex Rogers 25* (41); Arran Brindle 2/6 (2 overs)

Sussex won by 8 wickets
Spen Cama Memorial Ground, Fulking
Umpires: Terry Burstow and Trevor Cox

- Sussex won the toss and elected to field.
- Match reduced to 15 overs per side.
- Sussex progress to the final.

=== Third-place play-off ===
7 September 2013
Scorecard

Berkshire; 114/5 (18.4 overs)	v	Nottinghamshire; 113/8 (20 overs)
Alex Rogers 46 (40); Ruth Sprawson 3/15 (4 overs)		Danni Wyatt 28 (15); Daisy Gardner 2/14 (3 overs)

Berkshire won by 5 wickets
Spen Cama Memorial Ground, Fulking
Umpires: John Booker and Terry Burstow

- Berkshire won the toss and elected to field.

=== Final ===
7 September 2013
Scorecard

Sussex; 107/5 (20 overs)	v	Kent; 108/2 (18.2 overs)
Alexia Walker 26 (28); Charlotte Pape 2/23 (4 overs)		Charlotte Edwards 49 (46); Freya Davies 1/17 (4 overs)

Kent won by 8 wickets
Spen Cama Memorial Ground, Fulking
Umpires: Terry Burstow and Trevor Cox

- Sussex won the toss and elected to bat.
- Kent won the 2013 Women's Twenty20 Cup.

== Statistics ==
=== Most runs ===
Player	Team	Matches	Innings	Runs	Average	HS	100s	50s
Fran Wilson	Somerset	4	4	290	96.66	99	0	3
Rosalie Birch	Devon	4	4	248	248.00	113*	1	1
Heather Knight	Berkshire	4	4	225	56.25	80	0	2
Anya Shrubsole	Somerset	4	4	219	109.50	109*	1	1
Alexis Mannion	Hertfordshire	4	4	204	204.00	66	0	2

Source: CricketArchive

=== Most wickets ===
Player	Team	Balls	Wickets	Average	BBI	5w
Megan Belt	Kent	138	9	13.33	3/18	0
Lucy Maxwell	Nottinghamshire	80	8	7.62	4/19	0
Anisha Thind	Bedfordshire	72	7	5.42	4/5	0
Leah Kellogg	Derbyshire	96	7	7.42	3/15	0
Jenny Withers	Somerset	84	7	9.14	4/9	0

Source: CricketArchive
