= Maddie Ward =

English cricketer

Personal information
- Full name: Maddie Grace Ward
- Born: 19 January 2005 (age 21); Nottingham, England
- Batting: Right-handed
- Bowling: Right-arm off break
- Role: Wicket-keeper

Domestic team information
- Years: Team
- 2018–2024: Nottinghamshire
- 2024: Northern Diamonds
- 2025–: Yorkshire

Career statistics
Competition	WLA	WT20
Matches	15	33
Runs scored	287	365
Batting average	23.91	21.47
100s/50s	0/1	0/0
Top score	69*	43*
Balls bowled	270	87
Wickets	12	4
Bowling average	13.66	20.75
5 wickets in innings	0	0
10 wickets in match	0	0
Best bowling	3/5	2/8
Catches/stumpings	7/0	13/11
- Source: CricketArchive, 1 September 2025

Maddie Grace Ward (born 19 January 2005) is an English cricketer who currently plays for Yorkshire. She plays as a wicket-keeper and right-handed batter.

== Early life ==
Ward was born on 19 January 2005 in Nottingham.

== Domestic career ==
Ward made her county debut in 2018, for Nottinghamshire against Kent. She did not play again for the side until 2021, making six appearances in the Twenty20 Cup. She took five wickets at an average of 7.40 for the side in the 2024 ECB Women's County One-Day.

Ward was named in the Lightning and The Blaze Academies in 2021, 2022 and 2023 before moving to the Northern Diamonds Academy in 2024. On 30 April 2024, she was included in a senior Northern Diamonds matchday squad for the first time. She made her debut for the side on 26 August 2024, against Sunrisers in the Rachael Heyhoe Flint Trophy, scoring 20 and taking one catch.

== International career ==
In October 2022, Ward was selected in the England Under-19 squad for the 2023 ICC Under-19 Women's T20 World Cup. She played three matches in the tournament, taking one catch and making three stumpings. In March 2024, she was selected in the England Under-19 squad for their two tri-series in Sri Lanka. She played three matches on the tour, with seven dismissals.
