= Wales women's national cricket team =

Welsh team for women's cricket

Wales
- Flag of Wales

Personnel
- Captain: Lauren Parfitt

Team information
- Home ground: Various including Spytty Park, Newport

History
- WCC wins: 0
- T20 Cup wins: 0

International cricket
- First international: 14 August 2005 v the Netherlands at Miskin Manor, Wales
- Official website: Cricket Wales

The Wales women's cricket team is the Welsh team for women's cricket. They play their home matches at various grounds across the country, including Spytty Park, Newport and Pontarddulais Park, Pontarddulais. They are captained by Lauren Parfitt.

As in men's cricket, Wales does not normally compete as a separate country internationally, instead being represented as part of the England team, but in 2005 they played in the European Championship tournament as it was being held in Wales. They finished in third place in the tournament.

The team regularly participate in the English domestic county structure, and in 2019 they competed in Division Two of the final season of the Women's County Championship. They now compete in the Women's Twenty20 Cup. They are partnered with the regional side Western Storm.

== History ==
Wales Women's first recorded match was in 2002, against Scotland, which they won by 7 wickets. In 2004, Wales joined the English domestic county structure, competing in the County Challenge Cup: they finished 3rd in their group in their first season.

Between 2008 and 2010, Wales went through an extremely successful era in the Women's County Championship, gaining three promotions in a row, from Division 5M, Division 4 and Division 3. Ever since, Wales have played in Division 2 of the Championship, with their best finish of 3rd coming in 2018. Since 2009, Wales have also competed in the Women's Twenty20 Cup. In 2018, they gained promotion from Division Two, finishing second with 7 wins from 8 games. Overseas player Rachel Priest was key to their success, ending the season as the second leading run-scorer in the tournament, with teammate Gabrielle Basketter just behind her in third. In 2019, their first season in Division 1, Wales finished 7th. The following Twenty20 Cup season, in 2021, they finished 4th in the West Midlands Group with one victory, against eventual group winners Somerset. They finished third in their group in the 2022 Women's Twenty20 Cup. They also competed in the West Midlands Regional Cup in 2022, coming second in the initial group stage before beating Worcestershire in the final to win the inaugural edition of the competition. In 2023, the side lost in the group final in the 2023 Women's Twenty20 Cup to Somerset, and finished third in the West Midlands Regional Cup. In 2024, the side finished 6th in their group in the Twenty20 Cup and 4th in their group in the new ECB Women's County One-Day tournament.

Wales do not usually compete internationally, instead playing as a combined team with England. However, in 2005 they competed in the Women's European Championship, which was held in Wales. They won two matches, against Ireland and Scotland, and placed 3rd out of 5 in the final table.

== Players ==
=== Current squad ===
Based on appearances in the 2023 season.

| Name | Nationality | Birth date | Batting style | Bowling style | Notes |
Batters
| Rose Evans | Wales | March 1999 (age 27) | Right-handed | Right-arm leg break | |
| Ellie Hopkins | Wales | 26 September 1996 (age 30) | Right-handed | Unknown | |
| Lauren Parfitt | Wales | 1 April 1994 (age 32) | Right-handed | Slow left-arm orthodox | Club captain |
All-rounders
| Lydia Clements | England | 30 November 2004 (age 21) | Unknown | Unknown | |
| Alex Griffiths | Wales | 12 June 2002 (age 24) | Right-handed | Right-arm medium | |
| Niamh Mansel | Wales | Unknown | Unknown | Unknown | |
| Charlotte Scarborough | Wales | 2001 (age 24–25) | Right-handed | Right-arm medium | |
| Sophia Smale | Wales | 8 December 2004 (age 21) | Right-handed | Slow left-arm orthodox | |
Wicket-keepers
| Bethan Gammon | Wales | 10 March 2001 (age 25) | Right-handed | – | |
| Georgia Parfitt | Wales | 1 September 1998 (age 28) | Right-handed | – | |
| Libby Thomas | Wales | 19 January 2004 (age 22) | Left-handed | – | |
Bowlers
| Martha Bilsland | Wales | Unknown | Unknown | Unknown | |
| Emma Brazier | Wales | 29 June 2002 (age 24) | Unknown | Unknown | |
| Madison Evans | Wales | 28 November 2000 (age 25) | Unknown | Unknown | |
| Cerys Griffiths | Wales | Unknown | Unknown | Unknown | |
| Kelsey Hughes | Wales | Unknown | Unknown | Unknown | |
| Seren Hughes | Wales | 30 October 2003 (age 23) | Unknown | Right-arm medium | |
| Eve Jackson | Wales | 20 May 2007 (age 19) | Unknown | Unknown | |
| Emily Janas | Wales | Unknown | Unknown | Unknown | |
| Claire Nicholas | Wales | 8 September 1986 (age 40) | Right-handed | Right-arm off break | |
| Sara Phillips | Wales | 30 December 2004 (age 21) | Right-handed | Right-arm leg break | |
| Nicole Reid | Wales | 6 October 1997 (age 29) | Unknown | Right-arm leg break | |
| Ffion Wynne | Wales | 2 August 1996 (age 30) | Right-handed | Right-arm medium | |

== Seasons ==
=== Women's County Championship ===
| Season | Division | League standings | | | | | | | | Notes |
| Season | Division | P | W | L | T | A/C | BP | Pts | Pos | Notes |
|---|---|---|---|---|---|---|---|---|---|---|
| 2004 | County Challenge Cup G3 | 3 | 1 | 2 | 0 | 0 | 21 | 33 | 3rd | |
| 2005 | County Challenge Cup G3 | 2 | 1 | 1 | 0 | 0 | 14 | 26 | 3rd | |
| 2006 | County Challenge Cup G3 | 3 | 2 | 1 | 0 | 0 | 4 | 44 | 2nd | |
| 2007 | County Challenge Cup G2 | 3 | 1 | 1 | 0 | 1 | 4 | 39 | 2nd | |
| 2008 | Division 5M | 3 | 2 | 1 | 0 | 0 | 0 | 40 | 2nd | Promoted |
| 2009 | Division 4 | 10 | 9 | 1 | 0 | 0 | 5 | 185 | 1st | Promoted |
| 2010 | Division 3 | 10 | 8 | 2 | 0 | 0 | 53 | 133 | 1st | Promoted |
| 2011 | Division 2 | 10 | 0 | 9 | 0 | 1 | 31 | 31 | 6th | |
| 2012 | Division 2 | 8 | 2 | 4 | 0 | 2 | 29 | 49 | 7th | |
| 2013 | Division 2 | 8 | 1 | 6 | 0 | 1 | 35 | 45 | 7th | |
| 2014 | Division 2 | 8 | 3 | 4 | 0 | 1 | 39 | 69 | 6th | |
| 2015 | Division 2 | 8 | 2 | 4 | 0 | 2 | 37 | 57 | 6th | |
| 2016 | Division 2 | 7 | 3 | 2 | 0 | 2 | 30 | 60 | 5th | |
| 2017 | Division 2 | 7 | 3 | 4 | 0 | 0 | 42 | 72 | 5th | |
| 2018 | Division 2 | 7 | 4 | 2 | 0 | 1 | 42 | 82 | 3rd | |
| 2019 | Division 2 | 7 | 3 | 3 | 1 | 0 | 43 | 78 | 5th | |

=== Women's European Championship ===
| Season | League standings | | | | | | | Notes |
| Season | P | W | L | T | A/C | Pts | Pos | Notes |
|---|---|---|---|---|---|---|---|---|
| 2005 | 4 | 2 | 2 | 0 | 0 | 4 | 3rd | |

=== Women's Twenty20 Cup ===
| Season | Division | League standings | | | | | | | | Notes |
| Season | Division | P | W | L | T | A/C | NRR | Pts | Pos | Notes |
|---|---|---|---|---|---|---|---|---|---|---|
| 2009 | Division 6 | 3 | 0 | 0 | 0 | 3 | − | 3 | 1st | |
| 2010 | Division S2 | 3 | 3 | 0 | 0 | 0 | +1.22 | 6 | 1st | Promoted |
| 2011 | Division S&W 1 | 3 | 0 | 3 | 0 | 0 | −2.73 | 0 | 4th | |
| 2012 | Division S&W 1 | 3 | 1 | 2 | 0 | 0 | −1.04 | 2 | 3rd | |
| 2013 | Division S&W 1 | 3 | 1 | 2 | 0 | 0 | −3.05 | 2 | 3rd | |
| 2014 | Division 2C | 4 | 2 | 2 | 0 | 0 | −1.14 | 8 | 5th | |
| 2015 | Division 2 | 8 | 3 | 5 | 0 | 0 | −0.24 | 12 | 6th | |
| 2016 | Division 2 | 7 | 4 | 2 | 0 | 1 | +0.95 | 17 | 3rd | |
| 2017 | Division 2 | 8 | 3 | 3 | 0 | 2 | +0.07 | 14 | 5th | |
| 2018 | Division 2 | 8 | 7 | 1 | 0 | 0 | +1.95 | 28 | 2nd | Promoted |
| 2019 | Division 1 | 8 | 2 | 4 | 0 | 2 | −0.32 | 10 | 7th | |
| 2021 | West Midlands | 8 | 1 | 3 | 0 | 4 | −0.86 | 8 | 4th | |
| 2022 | Group 3 | 6 | 3 | 3 | 0 | 0 | −0.89 | 12 | 3rd | |
| 2023 | Group 8 | 6 | 2 | 0 | 0 | 4 | +2.930 | 12 | 1st | Lost final |
| 2024 | Group 4 | 8 | 4 | 2 | 0 | 2 | +0.64 | 72 | 6th | |

=== ECB Women's County One-Day ===
| Season | Group | League standings | | | | | | | | Notes |
| Season | Group | P | W | L | T | A/C | BP | Pts | Pos | Notes |
|---|---|---|---|---|---|---|---|---|---|---|
| 2024 | Group 3 | 4 | 2 | 1 | 0 | 0 | 1 | 11 | 4th | |

== See also ==
- Wales national cricket team
- Western Storm
