= Megan Belt =

English cricketer

Personal information
- Full name: Megan Sarah Belt
- Born: 6 October 1997 (age 29); Margate, Kent, England
- Batting: Right-handed
- Bowling: Right-arm off break
- Role: Bowler

Domestic team information
- Years: Team
- 2013–present: Kent
- 2020: South East Stars
- 2021: Oval Invincibles

Career statistics
Competition	WLA	WT20
Matches	47	62
Runs scored	63	32
Batting average	5.72	3.55
100s/50s	0/0	0/0
Top score	29	7*
Balls bowled	2,173	1,301
Wickets	75	67
Bowling average	16.65	16.61
5 wickets in innings	1	0
10 wickets in match	0	0
Best bowling	5/8	4/14
Catches/stumpings	5/–	9/–
- Source: CricketArchive, 23 October 2023

Megan Sarah Belt (born 6 October 1997) is an English cricketer who currently plays for Kent. She plays as a right-arm off break bowler. She previously played for South East Stars and Oval Invincibles.

== Early life ==
Belt was born on 6 October 1997 in Margate, Kent. She attends Canterbury Christ Church University, as well as working as a PE teacher.

== Domestic career ==
Belt made her county debut in 2013, for Kent against Berkshire. She was part of the Kent team that won the County Championship in 2014, the Twenty20 Cup and County Championship double in 2016 and the County Championship again in 2019. She was the leading wicket-taker in the 2013 Women's Twenty20 Cup, and the second-leading wicket-taker in the 2016 County Championship. She also achieved her maiden county five-wicket haul in the 2016 Championship, taking 5/8 against Yorkshire. In 2019, Belt again had a successful season, ending the Championship as Kent's leading wicket-taker, with 12 wickets at an average of 17.75. She was Kent's second-highest wicket-taker in the 2021 Women's Twenty20 Cup, with eight wickets at an average of 16.00. She was also the joint-leading wicket-taker in the 2021 Women's London Championship, with 7 wickets. She took two wickets in six matches in the 2022 Women's Twenty20 Cup. She played two matches in the 2023 Women's Twenty20 Cup, taking two wickets.

In 2020, Belt played for South East Stars in the Rachael Heyhoe Flint Trophy. She appeared in two matches, taking 2 wickets at an average of 41.00. In 2021, she was in the Oval Invincibles squad in The Hundred, but did not play a match.
