= Mary Richards (cricketer) =

English cricketer

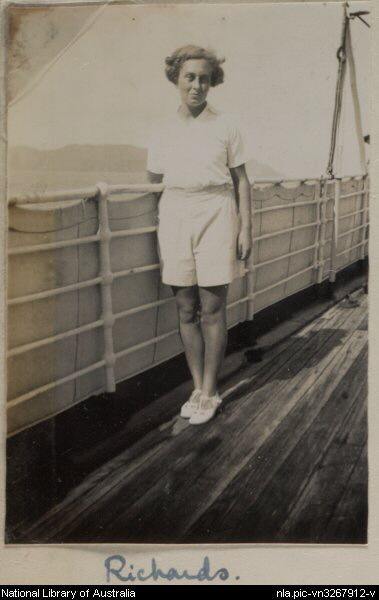

Personal information
- Full name: Margery Eileen Richards
- Born: 7 August 1910; Mandalay, Burma
- Died: 22 June 1990 (aged 79); Dollar, Clackmannanshire, Scotland
- Role: Batter

International information
- National side: England (1935)
- Test debut (cap 12): 4 January 1935 v Australia
- Last Test: 18 February 1935 v New Zealand

Domestic team information
- Years: Team
- 1934: West
- 1937: Kent

Career statistics
Competition	WTest	WFC
Matches	3	7
Runs scored	100	156
Batting average	33.33	19.50
100s/50s	0/0	0/0
Top score	48*	48*
Balls bowled	60	60
Wickets	0	0
Bowling average	–	–
5 wickets in innings	0	0
10 wickets in match	0	0
Best bowling	–	–
Catches/stumpings	2/–	3/–
- Source: CricketArchive, 11 March 2021

Margery "Mary" Eileen Richards (7 August 1910 – 22 June 1990) was an English cricketer who played primarily as a batter. She appeared in three Test matches for England in 1935. She played domestic cricket for West of England and Kent.
