= 2006 Women's County Championship =

- Administrator: England and Wales Cricket Board
- Cricket format: 50 over
- Tournament format: League system
- Champions: Kent (1st title)
- Participants: 28
- Most runs: Jenny Gunn (356)
- Most wickets: Charlotte Edwards (12)

The 2006 Women's County One-Day Championship was the 10th cricket Women's County Championship season. It ran from May to August and saw 27 county teams plus Wales compete in a series of divisions. Kent Women won the County Championship as winners of the top division, achieving the first Championship title.

== Competition format ==
Teams played matches within a series of divisions with the winners of the top division being crowned County Champions. Matches were played using a one day format with 50 overs per side.

The championship works on a points system with positions within the divisions being based on the total points. Points were awarded as follows:

Win: 20 points.
Tie: 15 points.
Loss: Bonus points.
No Result: 4 points.
Abandoned: 4 points.

Up to four batting and four bowling points were available to the losing team only, or both teams in an incomplete match.

== Teams ==
The 2006 Championship was divided into two tiers: the County Championship and the County Challenge Cup. The County Championship consisted of three divisions of four teams, whilst the Challenge Cup consisted of four groups of four teams, on equal standing, with the winners proceeding to a play-off round for promotion to the County Championship.

Teams in the County Championship played each other twice, whilst teams in the Challenge Cup played each other once.

=== County Championship ===
Division One	Kent	Lancashire	Somerset	Sussex
Division Two	Berkshire	Cheshire	Nottinghamshire	Yorkshire
Division Three	Middlesex	Surrey	Staffordshire	Northamptonshire

=== County Challenge Cup ===
Group 1	Cumbria	Derbyshire	Durham	Northumberland
Group 2	Essex	Hertfordshire	Leicestershire	Norfolk
Group 3	Wales	Warwickshire	Wiltshire	Worcestershire
Group 4	Cornwall	Devon	Dorset	Hampshire

== County Championship ==
=== Division One ===
Team	Pld	W	L	T	A	Bat	Bowl	Ded	Pts
Kent (C)	6	5	0	0	1	0	2	0	106
Sussex	6	4	1	0	1	1	0	0	85
Lancashire	6	1	5	0	0	9	11	0	40
Somerset (R)	6	1	5	0	0	5	8	0	33

Source: ECB Women's County Championship

=== Division Two ===
Team	Pld	W	L	T	A	Bat	Bowl	Ded	Pts
Nottinghamshire (P)	6	4	1	0	1	4	0	0	88
Yorkshire	6	3	2	0	1	6	4	0	74
Berkshire	6	2	2	0	2	5	10	0	63
Cheshire (R)	6	0	4	0	2	6	5	0	19

Source: ECB Women's County Championship

=== Division Three ===
Team	Pld	W	L	T	A	Bat	Bowl	Ded	Pts
Surrey (P)	6	3	1	0	2	6	5	0	79
Staffordshire	6	3	1	0	2	4	3	0	75
Middlesex	6	3	2	0	1	4	2	0	70
Northamptonshire (R)	6	0	5	0	1	3	5	0	12

Source: ECB Women's County Championship

== County Challenge Cup ==
=== Group 1 ===
Team	Pld	W	L	T	A	Bat	Bowl	Ded	Pts
Derbyshire (PO)	3	3	0	0	0	0	0	0	60
Durham	3	2	1	0	0	0	4	0	44
Cumbria	3	1	2	0	0	1	0	0	21
Northumberland	3	0	3	0	0	0	0	0	0

Source: ECB Women's County Championship

=== Group 2 ===
Team	Pld	W	L	T	A	Bat	Bowl	Ded	Pts
Essex (PO)	3	2	1	0	0	3	1	0	44
Hertfordshire	3	2	1	0	0	0	0	0	40
Norfolk	3	1	2	0	0	4	6	0	30
Leicestershire	3	1	2	0	0	3	7	0	30

Source: ECB Women's County Championship

=== Group 3 ===
Team	Pld	W	L	T	A	Bat	Bowl	Ded	Pts
Warwickshire (PO)	3	3	0	0	0	0	0	0	60
Wales	3	2	1	0	0	1	3	0	44
Worcestershire	3	1	2	0	0	4	6	0	30
Wiltshire	3	0	3	0	0	0	0	0	0

Source: ECB Women's County Championship

=== Group 4 ===
Team	Pld	W	L	T	A	Bat	Bowl	Ded	Pts
Hampshire (PO)	3	3	0	0	0	0	0	0	60
Dorset	3	2	1	0	0	1	0	0	41
Devon	3	1	2	0	0	2	5	0	27
Cornwall	3	0	3	0	0	2	6	0	8

Source: ECB Women's County Championship

=== Play-off ===
Team	Pld	W	L	T	A	Bat	Bowl	Ded	Pts
Warwickshire (P)	3	2	0	0	1	0	0	0	44
Derbyshire	3	2	0	0	1	0	0	0	44
Essex	3	0	2	0	1	4	0	0	8
Hampshire	3	0	2	0	1	0	3	0	7

Source: ECB Women's County Championship

== Statistics ==
=== Most runs ===
Player	Team	Matches	Innings	Runs	Average	HS	100s	50s
Jenny Gunn	Nottinghamshire	5	5	356	71.20	121	2	1
Charlotte Edwards	Kent	6	4	335	167.50	139	1	2
Sarah Taylor	Sussex	6	6	320	53.33	91	0	2
Janice Fraser	Middlesex	5	5	307	76.75	115	1	1
Caroline Atkins	Sussex	6	6	261	52.20	108*	1	1

Source: CricketArchive

=== Most wickets ===
Player	Team	Balls	Wickets	Average	BBI	5w
Charlotte Edwards	Kent	312	12	13.25	4/15	0
Ilze Cronje	Surrey	264	11	10.63	3/19	0
Emily Drumm	Kent	139	9	9.77	4/32	0
Lizzie Roberts	Berkshire	184	9	12.37	4/20	0
Amanda Potgieter	Surrey	282	8	15.00	4/18	0

Source: CricketArchive
