= Joleigh Roberts =

English cricketer

Personal information
- Full name: Joleigh L Roberts
- Batting: Right-handed
- Bowling: Right-arm medium
- Role: Bowler

Domestic team information
- Years: Team
- 2017–2019: Cornwall
- 2019–present: Somerset
- 2021: Western Storm

Career statistics
Competition	WLA	WT20
Matches	16	36
Runs scored	191	145
Batting average	31.83	16.11
100s/50s	0/2	0/0
Top score	59*	32*
Balls bowled	643	504
Wickets	16	12
Bowling average	25.06	44.54
5 wickets in innings	0	0
10 wickets in match	0	0
Best bowling	3/37	2/14
Catches/stumpings	2/–	1/–
- Source: CricketArchive, 19 October 2024

Joleigh L Roberts is an English cricketer who currently plays for Somerset. She plays primarily as a right-arm medium bowler. She has previously played for Cornwall and Western Storm.

== Domestic career ==
Roberts made her county debut in 2017, for Cornwall against Dorset, in which she took 2/18 from 8 overs. She went on to take 6 wickets in the County Championship that season, the joint-most for her side, at an average of 21.33. She again took 6 wickets in the County Championship, at an average of 20.66. In 2019, she took four wickets apiece in the County Championship and the Twenty20 Cup for Cornwall, whilst also playing one match for Somerset.

After the 2020 season was cancelled due to the COVID-19 pandemic, Roberts permanently joined Somerset for the 2021 Women's Twenty20 Cup, in which she took 2 wickets for the side as they won the West Midlands Group of the tournament. She was also named in the Western Storm Academy in 2021, and made her debut for the full team on 10 September the same year, against Northern Diamonds in the Rachael Heyhoe Flint Trophy. In 2022, she was ever-present for Somerset in the Twenty20 Cup, taking two wickets.
