= Lynsey Askew =

English cricketer (born 1986)

Personal information
- Full name: Lynsey Riann Frances Askew
- Born: 3 September 1986 (age 40); Bromley, Greater London, England
- Batting: Right-handed
- Bowling: Right-arm medium
- Role: Bowler
- Relatives: Alex Blackwell (wife)

International information
- National side: England (2006–2008)
- ODI debut (cap 109): 28 February 2007 v India
- Last ODI: 14 August 2008 v South Africa
- T20I debut (cap 15): 5 August 2006 v India
- Last T20I: 23 August 2008 v South Africa

Domestic team information
- Years: Team
- 2002–2009: Kent
- 2008/09: Otago
- 2010/11–2014/15: Australian Capital Territory
- 2012: Kent
- 2015: Kent

Career statistics
Competition	WODI	WT20I	WLA	WT20
Matches	8	6	97	52
Runs scored	120	1	666	317
Batting average	24.00	1.00	13.32	11.74
100s/50s	0/1	0/0	0/1	0/1
Top score	68	1	68	69*
Balls bowled	336	126	4,667	1,002
Wickets	6	6	109	48
Bowling average	46.16	21.00	22.98	19.62
5 wickets in innings	0	0	1	0
10 wickets in match	0	0	0	0
Best bowling	2/19	2/13	5/5	4/13
Catches/stumpings	0/–	0/–	28/–	17/–
- Source: CricketArchive, 6 March 2021

Lynsey Riann Frances Askew (born 3 September 1986) is an English former cricketer who played as a right-arm medium bowler and right-handed batter. She appeared in eight One Day Internationals and six Twenty20 Internationals for England between 2006 and 2008. She played domestic cricket for Kent, Otago and Australian Capital Territory.

== Early and personal life ==
Askew was born on 3 September 1986 in Bromley, Greater London.

In 1995, at the age of nine, Askew, together with some friends, started a ladies team at Hayes Cricket Club. She attended Hayes School and was part of the team that won the 2002 National Under-15 Championship.

Askew is married to former Australian cricketer Alex Blackwell.

== Domestic career ==
Askew played county cricket for Kent, initially between 2002 and 2009. She later returned for brief stints in 2012 and 2015. She had a brief spell with Otago in 2008/09 and played for Australian Capital Territory between 2010 and 2014.

== International career ==
Askew took six wickets in One Day Internationals and six wickets in Twenty20 Internationals. She made her international high score of 68 in a One Day International against New Zealand at Chemplast Cricket Ground, Chennai on 3 March 2007. Her partnership of 73 with Isa Guha set a new record for highest ninth-wicket partnership in Women's One Day Internationals, which remained unbroken until 2024.
