= West Midlands Regional Cup =

English women's cricket competition

- Countries: England
- Administrator: Central Sparks
- Format: Limited overs cricket (50 overs per side)
- First edition: 2022
- Latest edition: 2023
- Tournament format: League system and final
- Number of teams: 4
- Current champion: Worcestershire (1st title)
- Most successful: Wales (1 title); Worcestershire (1 title)
- Website: West Midlands Regional Cup

The West Midlands Regional Cup is a domestic women's one-day cricket competition in England. Organised by the Central Sparks regional team, the tournament involves four teams based in or near the West Midlands, with its first edition taking place in 2022. Staffordshire, Wales, Warwickshire and Worcestershire are the four teams competing, with Warwickshire also playing "in a consortium" with Shropshire.

Following the end of the Women's County Championship in 2019 and the launching of the new regional structure for domestic women's cricket in England in 2020, county sides were left without any 50-over cricket. Following the launch of similar competitions such as the East of England Women's County Championship, the Women's London Championship and the South Central Counties Cup, the West Midlands Regional Cup aims to continue the provision of longer-format county cricket, and support the development of players not playing in The Hundred, which takes place concurrently with the competition.

The inaugural 2022 edition of the competition took place from 17 July to 4 September, with each team playing each other once and the top two sides advancing to a final. Worcestershire and Wales topped the group stage, with Wales winning in the final by 10 runs. The 2023 edition of the tournament was won by Worcestershire, who beat Staffordshire in the final.
