= 2008 Women's County Championship =

- Administrator: England and Wales Cricket Board
- Cricket format: 50 over
- Tournament format: League system
- Champions: Sussex (4th title)
- Participants: 33
- Most runs: Heather Knight (402)
- Most wickets: Isabelle Westbury (12); Hannah Courtnell (12); Charlotte Anneveld (12)

The 2008 Women's County One-Day Championship was the 12th cricket Women's County Championship season. It ran from May to August and saw 31 county teams and teams representing Scotland and Wales compete in a series of divisions. Sussex Women won the County Championship as winners of the top division, achieving their fourth title.

== Competition format ==
Teams played matches within a series of divisions with the winners of the top division being crowned County Champions. Matches were played using a one day format with 50 overs per team.

The championship works on a points system with positions within the divisions being based on the total points. Points were awarded as follows:

Win: 20 points.
Tie: 16 points.
Loss: Bonus points.
Abandoned or No Result: 6 points.
Cancelled No Play: 10 points.

Up to four batting and four bowling points were available to the losing team only, or both teams in an incomplete match.

== Teams ==
The 2008 Championship was divided into five divisions: Divisions One to Four with four teams apiece and Division Five with 17 teams split across four regional groups.

Teams in the top four Divisions played each other twice, and teams in Division Five played each other once.

| Division One | Berkshire | Kent | Nottinghamshire | Sussex | |
| Division Two | Lancashire | Somerset | Surrey | Warwickshire | |
| Division Three | Cheshire | Derbyshire | Middlesex | Yorkshire | |
| Division Four | Essex | Hampshire | Staffordshire | Worcestershire | |
| Division Five London & East | Hertfordshire | Norfolk | Suffolk | Wiltshire | |
| Division Five Midlands | Leicestershire | Northamptonshire | Shropshire | Wales | |
| Division Five North | Cumbria | Durham | Northumberland | Scotland | |
| Division Five South & West | Cornwall | Devon | Dorset | Gloucestershire | Oxfordshire |

== Division One ==
| Team | Pld | W | L | T | A | Bat | Bowl | Ded | Pts |
|---|---|---|---|---|---|---|---|---|---|
| Sussex (C) | 6 | 5 | 0 | 0 | 1 | 1 | 0 | 0 | 107 |
| Kent | 6 | 4 | 1 | 0 | 1 | 0 | 5 | 0 | 91 |
| Nottinghamshire | 6 | 2 | 4 | 0 | 0 | 5 | 8 | 0 | 53 |
| Berkshire | 6 | 0 | 6 | 0 | 0 | 7 | 9 | 0 | 16 |

Source: ECB Women's County Championship

== Division Two ==
| Team | Pld | W | L | T | A | Bat | Bowl | Ded | Pts |
|---|---|---|---|---|---|---|---|---|---|
| Surrey (P) | 6 | 5 | 1 | 0 | 0 | 4 | 2 | 0 | 106 |
| Somerset (P) | 6 | 4 | 2 | 0 | 0 | 2 | 4 | 0 | 86 |
| Lancashire | 6 | 3 | 3 | 0 | 0 | 0 | 3 | 0 | 63 |
| Warwickshire | 6 | 0 | 6 | 0 | 0 | 5 | 12 | 0 | 17 |

Source: ECB Women's County Championship

== Division Three ==
| Team | Pld | W | L | T | A | Bat | Bowl | Ded | Pts |
|---|---|---|---|---|---|---|---|---|---|
| Yorkshire (P) | 6 | 5 | 0 | 0 | 1 | 0 | 4 | 0 | 110 |
| Middlesex (P) | 6 | 3 | 3 | 0 | 0 | 1 | 9 | 0 | 70 |
| Cheshire (P) | 6 | 2 | 4 | 0 | 0 | 1 | 12 | 0 | 53 |
| Derbyshire | 6 | 1 | 4 | 0 | 1 | 6 | 6 | 0 | 38 |

Source: ECB Women's County Championship

== Division Four ==
| Team | Pld | W | L | T | A | Bat | Bowl | Ded | Pts |
|---|---|---|---|---|---|---|---|---|---|
| Essex (Note: Essex were promoted two divisions to Division Two for the 2009 season, whilst the other three teams moved to Division Three, due to restructuring of the Championship.) (P) | 6 | 6 | 0 | 0 | 0 | 0 | 0 | 0 | 120 |
| Staffordshire | 6 | 4 | 2 | 0 | 0 | 2 | 0 | 0 | 82 |
| Worcestershire | 6 | 1 | 5 | 0 | 0 | 4 | 13 | 0 | 37 |
| Hampshire | 6 | 1 | 5 | 0 | 0 | 4 | 7 | 0 | 31 |

Source: ECB Women's County Championship

== Division Five ==
Due to restructuring of the Championship to expand the number of teams per division in 2009, the winners of the Division Five groups went into a play-off to determine promotion: the top two were promoted to Division Three, whilst the bottom two would form Division Four along with the four second-placed Division Five teams.

=== London & East ===
| Team | Pld | W | L | T | A | Bat | Bowl | Ded | Pts |
|---|---|---|---|---|---|---|---|---|---|
| Norfolk (PO) | 3 | 2 | 0 | 0 | 1 | 0 | 0 | 0 | 50 |
| Hertfordshire (P) | 3 | 2 | 1 | 0 | 0 | 0 | 4 | 0 | 44 |
| Wiltshire | 3 | 1 | 2 | 0 | 0 | 0 | 2 | 0 | 22 |
| Suffolk | 3 | 0 | 2 | 0 | 1 | 0 | 0 | 0 | 10 |

Source: ECB Women's County Championship

=== Midlands ===
| Team | Pld | W | L | T | A | Bat | Bowl | Ded | Pts |
|---|---|---|---|---|---|---|---|---|---|
| Northamptonshire (PO) | 3 | 3 | 0 | 0 | 0 | 0 | 0 | 0 | 60 |
| Wales (P) | 3 | 2 | 1 | 0 | 0 | 0 | 0 | 0 | 40 |
| Leicestershire | 3 | 0 | 2 | 1 | 0 | 1 | 5 | 0 | 22 |
| Shropshire | 3 | 0 | 2 | 1 | 0 | 0 | 0 | 0 | 16 |

Source: ECB Women's County Championship

=== North ===
| Team | Pld | W | L | T | A | Bat | Bowl | Ded | Pts |
|---|---|---|---|---|---|---|---|---|---|
| Scotland (PO) | 3 | 3 | 0 | 0 | 0 | 0 | 0 | 0 | 60 |
| Durham (P) | 3 | 2 | 1 | 0 | 0 | 2 | 0 | 0 | 42 |
| Cumbria | 3 | 1 | 2 | 0 | 0 | 1 | 0 | 0 | 21 |
| Northumberland | 3 | 0 | 3 | 0 | 0 | 4 | 4 | 0 | 8 |

Source: ECB Women's County Championship

=== South & West ===
| Team | Pld | W | L | T | A | Bat | Bowl | Ded | Pts |
|---|---|---|---|---|---|---|---|---|---|
| Devon (PO) | 4 | 4 | 0 | 0 | 0 | 0 | 0 | 0 | 80 |
| Cornwall (P) | 4 | 3 | 1 | 0 | 0 | 2 | 3 | 0 | 65 |
| Gloucestershire | 4 | 2 | 2 | 0 | 0 | 3 | 3 | 0 | 46 |
| Dorset | 4 | 1 | 3 | 0 | 0 | 3 | 9 | 0 | 32 |
| Oxfordshire | 4 | 0 | 4 | 0 | 0 | 0 | 5 | 0 | 5 |

Source: ECB Women's County Championship

=== Play-off ===
| Team | Pld | W | L | T | A | Bat | Bowl | Ded | Pts |
|---|---|---|---|---|---|---|---|---|---|
| Scotland (P) | 3 | 3 | 0 | 0 | 0 | 0 | 0 | 0 | 60 |
| Devon (P) | 3 | 1 | 2 | 0 | 0 | 0 | 1 | 0 | 21 |
| Norfolk (P) | 3 | 1 | 2 | 0 | 0 | 0 | 0 | 0 | 20 |
| Northamptonshire (P) | 3 | 1 | 2 | 0 | 0 | 0 | 0 | 0 | 20 |

Source: ECB Women's County Championship

== Statistics ==
=== Most runs ===
| Player | Team | Matches | Innings | Runs | Average | HS | 100s | 50s |
|---|---|---|---|---|---|---|---|---|
| Heather Knight | Devon | 5 | 5 | 402 | 80.40 | 190 | 1 | 3 |
| Elwyn Campbell | Somerset | 6 | 6 | 336 | 84.00 | 94* | 0 | 3 |
| Laura Joyce | Surrey | 6 | 6 | 260 | 43.33 | 95 | 0 | 3 |
| Danni Wyatt | Staffordshire | 6 | 6 | 252 | 63.00 | 117* | 1 | 1 |
| Claire Taylor | Berkshire | 6 | 6 | 244 | 40.66 | 146 | 1 | 0 |

Source: CricketArchive

=== Most wickets ===
| Player | Team | Balls | Wickets | Average | BBI | 5w |
|---|---|---|---|---|---|---|
| Isabelle Westbury | Somerset | 192 | 12 | 6.41 | 5/20 | 1 |
| Hannah Courtnell | Essex | 300 | 12 | 9.75 | 4/13 | 0 |
| Charlotte Anneveld | Kent | 300 | 12 | 11.50 | 4/18 | 0 |
| Danielle Hazell | Yorkshire | 259 | 11 | 8.63 | 4/1 | 0 |
| Alexia Walker | Sussex | 259 | 11 | 9.36 | 5/17 | 1 |

Source: CricketArchive
