= Warwickshire Women cricket team =

English women's cricket team

Warwickshire Women

Personnel
- Captain: TBA
- Coach: Alistair Maiden
- Overseas player: TBA

Team information
- Founded: Unknown First recorded match: 1937
- Home ground: Mitchells & Butlers' Ground, Birmingham

History
- One Day Cup (women's) wins: 0
- T20 Blast (women's) wins: 0
- Official website: Warwickshire Women

The Warwickshire Women's cricket team is the women's representative cricket team for the English historic county of Warwickshire. They play their home games at Edgbaston Foundation Sports Ground, Birmingham, and are captained by Marie Kelly. In 2019, they won the Women's Twenty20 Cup. They are partnered with the regional side Central Sparks.

== History ==
=== 1937–2000: Early History ===
Warwickshire Women played their first recorded match in 1937, against Australia, which they lost by 7 wickets. Warwickshire went on to play various one-off matches, including regular matches against Surrey. Meanwhile, West Midlands Women, which included players from Warwickshire, joined the Women's Area Championship in 1980, and played in the competition until it ended in 1996, upon which they joined the Women's County Championship.

=== 2001– : Women's County Championship ===
Warwickshire Women replaced West Midlands Women in the County Championship in 2001, and finished 4th in Division 3 in their first season. Warwickshire played in the lower tiers of the Championship in the early years of the competition, before making their way up the divisions, beginning with their promotion from the County Challenge Cup in 2006, followed by promotions from Division Three in 2007 and Division Two in 2012. Ever since, Warwickshire have played in Division 1, with their highest finish of 3rd coming in both 2016 and 2017.

Warwickshire joined the Women's Twenty20 Cup for its inaugural season in 2009. The team rapidly improved in recent years, being promoted from Division 2 in 2015, then finishing 2nd in Division 1 in 2016. In 2019, Warwickshire won Division 1, topping the league with 5 wins from 8 to be crowned Champions. Captain Marie Kelly was their star batter, ending the season as the division's leading run-scorer. Key contributions also came from wicket-keeper Gwenan Davies and bowlers Jessica Couser and Bethan Ellis. In 2021, the Twenty20 Cup was regionalised (and the County Championship discontinued), with Warwickshire competing in the West Midlands Group. They finished 2nd in the group, going unbeaten with 4 wins and 4 matches abandoned. They topped their group in the 2022 Women's Twenty20 Cup, before beating Somerset in the group final on Finals Day. Warwickshire bowler Anisha Patel was the leading wicket-taker across the whole competition, with 15 wickets. They also began competing in the West Midlands Regional Cup in 2022, as a "consortium" team with Shropshire, finishing third. They again won their group in the 2023 Women's Twenty20 Cup, beating Staffordshire in the group final. In 2024, the side won their group in the Twenty20 Cup before finishing 4th at the National Finals, and 10th in their group in the new ECB Women's County One-Day tournament.

Following the launch of the new professional era for the women's game, Warwickshire signed a deal with Vertu to become front-of-shirt sponsor of the Bears.

== Players ==
=== Current squad ===
- No. denotes the player's squad number, as worn on the back of their shirt.
- ‡ denotes players with international caps.

No.	Name	Nationality	Birth date	Batting style	Bowling style	Notes
Batters
2	Chloe Brewer	England	12 July 2002 (age 24)	Right-handed	Right-arm medium	
8	Davina Perrin	England	8 September 2006 (age 20)	Right-handed	Right-arm medium	
12	Sophie Beech	England	24 August 2007 (age 19)	Right-handed	Right-arm medium	
16	Meg Austin	England	7 September 2004 (age 22)	Right-handed	Right-arm leg break	
73	Nat Wraith	England	3 October 2001 (age 24)	Right-handed	—	
All-rounders
11	Millie Taylor	England	7 October 2004 (age 21)	Right-handed	Slow left-arm unorthodox	
28	Charis Pavely ‡	England	25 October 2004 (age 21)	Left-handed	Slow left-arm orthodox	
99	Katie George ‡	England	7 April 1999 (age 27)	Right-handed	Left-arm medium	
Wicket-keepers
Bowlers
3	Hannah Baker ‡	England	3 February 2004 (age 22)	Right-handed	Right-arm leg break	
9	Mary Taylor	England	7 October 2004 (age 21)	Right-handed	Right-arm fast-medium	
10	Amu Surenkumar	England	24 October 2006 (age 19)	Right-handed	Right-arm medium	
15	Phoebe Brett	England	5 June 2008 (age 18)	Right-handed	Slow left-arm orthodox	
22	Alexa Stonehouse	England	5 December 2004 (age 21)	Right-handed	Left-arm medium	
95	Issy Wong ‡	England	15 May 2002 (age 24)	Right-handed	Right-arm fast-medium	England skills contract
Source: Updated: 1 October 2026

=== Notable players ===
Players who have played for Warwickshire and played internationally are listed below, in order of first international appearance (given in brackets):

- (England) Muriel Haddelsey (1937)
- (England) Rachael Heyhoe Flint (1960)
- (England) June Bragger (1963)
- (England) Rosemary Goodchild (1966)
- (Australia) Lisa Keightley (1995)
- (Pakistan) Zehmarad Afzal (2000)
- (England) Jenny Gunn (2004)
- (New Zealand) Sophie Devine (2006)
- (Netherlands) Violet Wattenberg (2007)
- (Australia) Delissa Kimmince (2008)
- (England) Amy Jones (2013)
- (England) Rebecca Grundy (2014)
- (Australia) Sarah Aley (2017)
- (Scotland) Kathryn Bryce (2018)
- (Germany) Christina Gough (2019)
- (England) Issy Wong (2022)
- (England) Hannah Baker (2024)
- (England) Georgia Davis (2024)
- (England) Emily Arlott (2025)

== Seasons ==
=== Women's County Championship ===
Season	Division	League standings								Notes
Season	Division	P	W	L	T	A/C	BP	Pts	Pos	Notes
2001	Division 3	4	1	3	0	0	21.5	33.5	4th	
2002	Division 3	5	2	1	0	2	22.5	68.5	2nd	
2003	Division 3	5	3	1	0	1	27	74	3rd	
2004	County Challenge Cup G3	3	3	0	0	0	26.5	62.5	1st	
2005	County Challenge Cup G3	3	1	2	0	0	17.5	29.5	2nd	
2006	County Challenge Cup G3	3	3	0	0	0	0	60	1st	Promoted
2007	Division 3	6	3	0	0	3	0	105	1st	Promoted
2008	Division 2	6	0	6	0	0	17	17	4th	
2009	Division 2	10	4	6	0	0	16	96	5th	
2010	Division 2	10	6	4	0	0	56	116	3rd	
2011	Division 2	10	5	3	0	2	51	101	4th	
2012	Division 2	8	6	0	0	2	43	103	1st	Promoted
2013	Division 1	8	4	4	0	0	42	82	6th	
2014	Division 1	8	1	5	0	2	28	38	8th	
2015	Division 1	8	3	4	0	1	41	71	7th	
2016	Division 1	8	4	2	0	2	40	80	3rd	
2017	Division 1	7	5	2	0	0	46	96	3rd	
2018	Division 1	7	1	3	2	1	37	57	5th	
2019	Division 1	7	1	6	0	0	40	50	8th	

=== Women's Twenty20 Cup ===
Season	Division	League standings								Notes
Season	Division	P	W	L	T	A/C	NRR	Pts	Pos	Notes
2009	Division 2	3	0	2	0	1	−1.63	1	4th	
2010	Division M&N 1	3	0	3	0	0	−0.58	0	4th	
2011	Division M&N 1	3	2	1	0	0	+1.80	4	2nd	
2012	Division M&N 1	3	0	3	0	0	−1.27	0	4th	Relegated
2013	Division M&N 2	2	2	0	0	0	+6.26	4	1st	
2014	Division 1C	4	0	4	0	0	−1.85	0	8th	Relegated
2015	Division 2	8	6	2	0	0	+1.82	24	2nd	Promoted
2016	Division 1	7	4	2	0	1	+0.44	17	2nd	
2017	Division 1	8	4	4	0	0	+1.29	16	4th	
2018	Division 1	8	4	4	0	0	+0.38	16	4th	
2019	Division 1	8	5	3	0	0	−0.26	20	1st	Champions
2021	West Midlands	8	4	0	0	4	+2.66	20	2nd	
2022	Group 3	6	5	1	0	0	+2.44	20	1st	Group winners
2023	Group 2	6	0	0	0	6	+0.00	6	3rd	Group winners
2024	Group 2	8	6	0	0	2	+3.52	99	1st	4th in National Finals Group

=== ECB Women's County One-Day ===
Season	Group	League standings								Notes
Season	Group	P	W	L	T	A/C	BP	Pts	Pos	Notes
2024	Group 3	4	0	3	0	1	0	1	10th	

== Honours ==
- County Championship:
  - Division Two Champions (1) – 2012
  - Division Three Champions (1) – 2007
- Women's Twenty20 Cup:
  - Champions (1) – 2019
  - Division Two Champions (1) – 2015
  - Group winners (2) – 2022 & 2023

== See also ==
- Warwickshire County Cricket Club
- Central Sparks
