= Kent Women cricket team =

English cricket team

Kent Women

Personnel
- Captain: Megan Belt
- Coach: James Hockley
- Manager: Lucy Arman

Team information
- Founded: First recorded match: 1935
- Home ground: St Lawrence Ground

History
- WCC wins: 8
- T20 Cup wins: 3
- Official website: Kent Women

The Kent Women cricket team is the women's representative cricket team for the English county of Kent. They play their home matches at St Lawrence Ground in Canterbury, as well as the County Cricket Ground, Beckenham. They are captained by Megan Belt and are coached by former Kent County Cricket Club player James Hockley. They are the most successful team in both the Women's County Championship and Women's Twenty20 Cup, with 8 and 3 titles respectively. Until 2025, they were partnered with the regional team South East Stars.

== History ==
=== 1935–1996: Early History ===
Kent Women played their first recorded match in 1935, against Civil Service Women. Over the following years, Kent were one of the most prolific women's teams, playing various one-off and tourist games, against surrounding counties and national teams such as Australia, New Zealand and the Netherlands. Kent joined the Women's Area Championship in 1980, and played in the competition until 1996 (including two title wins, in 1986 and 1987), after which they joined the Women's County Championship.

=== 1997–2019: Women's County Championship ===
In 1997, their first season in the County Championship, Kent finished 5th in Division One with just one win. Over the next few seasons, Kent were a consistently mid-table team, plus one season in Division Two, in 2002. A steady improvement after their promotion, however, eventually led them to their first Championship title, in 2006. They retained their title in 2007, going unbeaten in both seasons. Key to their success was England captain Charlotte Edwards, who played for Kent from 2000 to 2016. This started an extremely successful era for Kent Women, winning the most titles in Championship history, eight, and only finishing outside the top 3 of Division 1 once, in 2017: the further times they won the Championship were in 2009, 2011, 2012, 2014, 2016 and 2019. In 2016, Kent bowlers Megan Belt, Tash Farrant and Charlotte Pape were the first, third and fourth leading wicket-takers respectively, whilst Tammy Beaumont was the leading run-scorer. Kent batters Fran Wilson, Tammy Beaumont and Maxine Blythin were all in the top ten leading run-scorers in 2019.

Kent Women have also been the most successful team in the history of the Women's Twenty20 Cup, winning the tournament three times, in 2011, 2013 and 2016. They also reached the semi-finals of the competition in 2013 and 2012, losing to Berkshire both times. In 2011, however, they beat Berkshire by 8 wickets after bowling them out for just 73. In 2013, Kent beat Sussex in the final by 8 wickets, whilst in 2016 they won the title by topping Division One, with five wins from seven games.

=== 2020–2024: Regional Twenty20 Cup ===
In 2021, they competed in the South East Group of the Twenty20 Cup, and won their region, going unbeaten with 6 wins and 2 matches abandoned due to rain. In 2022, they finished second in their group in the Twenty20 Cup, going on to lose in the final against Sussex. Kent have also competed in the Women's London Championship since its first edition in 2020, and won their first London Championship title in 2021. In the 2023 Women's Twenty20 Cup, Kent finished second in their group and reached the group final, but the title was shared due to rain. In 2024, the team finished 7th in their group in the Twenty20 Cup and 3rd in their group in the new ECB Women's County One-Day tournament.

== Players ==
=== Current squad ===
As of 23 April 2025

Players listed below are named as Kent squad players on the team's website. Other players may play matches for the team. ‡ denotes players with international caps.

No.	Name	Nationality	Birth date	Batting Style	Bowling Style	Notes
Batters
11	Jessica Bird	England	21 July 1999 (age 26)	Right-handed	Right-arm off break	
19	Ella Darlington	England	27 September 2006 (age 19)	Right-handed	Right-arm medium	
14	Jodie Hobson	England	25 November 2000 (age 25)	Right-handed	–	
4	Sophie Singer	England	22 May 2006 (age 19)	Right-handed	Right-arm leg spin	
17	Coco Streets	England	17 February 2002 (age 24)	Right-handed	Right-arm medium	Vice Captain
All-rounders
55	Elsa Barnfather	England	23 July 2003 (age 22)	Right-handed	Right-arm medium	
66	Tilly Callaghan	England	5 October 1998 (age 27)	Right-handed	Right-arm medium	
21	Amy Gordon	England	3 October 2001 (age 24)	Right-handed	Right-arm off break	
25	Isabella James	England	4 February 2005 (age 21)	Right-handed	Right-arm leg spin	
3	Genevieve Jeer	England	16 July 2009 (age 16)	Right-handed	Right-arm medium	
34	Isobel Kirby	England	6 February 2005 (age 21)	Right-handed	Right-arm medium	
2	Grace Poole	England	2 September 2000 (age 25)	Right-handed	Right-arm medium-fast	
20	Megan Sturge	England	3 November 2004 (age 21)	Right-handed	Right-arm leg spin	Loan Player
Wicket-keepers
12	Molly Davis	England	12 March 2001 (age 25)	Right-handed	–	
92	Emily Thompson	England	12 December 1997 (age 28)	Right-handed	–	
Bowlers
23	Laura Bailey	England	3 June 1992 (age 33)	Right-handed	Right-arm leg spin	
95	Olivia Barnes	England	9 July 2006 (age 19)	Right-handed	Left-arm orthodox spin	Loan Player
6	Megan Belt	England	6 October 1997 (age 28)	Right-handed	Right-arm off break	Captain
12	Zeena Bilal	England	12 October 2006 (age 19)	Right-handed	Right-arm medium	
15	Sydney Gorham	England	19 October 2003 (age 22)	Right-handed	Right-arm medium-fast	
63	Alice Grant	England	29 June 2004 (age 21)	Right-handed	Right-arm medium	

=== Notable players ===
Players who have played for Kent and played internationally are listed below, in order of first international appearance (given in brackets):

- (England) Betty Archdale (1934)
- (England) Doris Turner (1934)
- (England) Marjorie Richards (1935)
- (England) Cecilia Robinson (1949)
- (England) Audrey Disbury (1957)
- (England) Ruth Westbrook (1957)
- (England) Mollie Hunt (1960)
- (England) Alison Ratcliffe (1960)
- (England) Kathleen Smith (1960)
- (England) Ann Jago (1960)
- (Australia) Liz Amos (1961)
- (England) Jacqueline Elledge (1963)
- (England) Mary Pilling (1963)
- (England) Jean Clark (1968)
- (England) Chris Watmough (1968)
- (England) Heather Dewdney (1969)
- (England) Jill Cruwys (1969)
- (England) Katherine Brown (1973)
- (England) Susan Goatman (1973)
- (England) Sue Hilliam (1973)
- (England) Megan Lear (1973)
- (England) Jill Powell (1979)
- (England) June Edney (1984)
- (Netherlands) Mickey de Boer (1984)
- (England) Julie May (1986)
- (England) Lisa Nye (1988)
- (England) Caroline Barrs (1988)
- (England) Marie Moralee (1991)
- (New Zealand) Emily Drumm (1992)
- (Australia) Olivia Magno (1995)
- (England) Claire Whichcord (1995)
- (England) Charlotte Edwards (1996)
- (New Zealand) Paula Flannery (2000)
- (South Africa) Cri-Zelda Brits (2002)
- (New Zealand) Sarah Burke (2003)
- (England) Lydia Greenway (2003)
- (England) Jo Watts (2005)
- (New Zealand) Suzie Bates (2006)
- (England) Lynsey Askew (2006)
- (England) Laura Marsh (2006)
- (England) Tammy Beaumont (2009)
- (New Zealand) Erin Bermingham (2010)
- (England) Lauren Griffiths (2010)
- (England) Fran Wilson (2010)
- (England) Susie Rowe (2010)
- (England) Tash Farrant (2013)
- (England) Alice Davidson-Richards (2018)
- (Scotland) Sarah Bryce (2018)
- (England) Kirstie Gordon (2018)
- (Ireland) Arlene Kelly (2022)
- (Hong Kong) Elysa Hubbard (2022)
- (Scotland) Darcey Carter (2023)
- (England) Ryana MacDonald-Gay (2024)

== Seasons ==
=== Women's County Championship ===
Season	Division	P	W	L	T	A/C	BP	Pts	Pos	Notes
1997	Division 1	5	1	4	0	0	31.5	43.5	5th	
1998	Division 1	5	2	3	0	0	36.5	60.5	3rd	
1999	Division 1	5	2	3	0	0	30.5	54.5	5th	
2000	Division 1	5	2	3	0	0	31	55	3rd	
2001	Division 1	5	0	5	0	0	24.5	24.5	6th	Relegated
2002	Division 2	5	3	0	0	2	28.5	86.5	1st	Promoted
2003	Division 1	5	3	2	0	0	32.5	68.5	3rd	
2004	Division 1	5	4	1	0	0	43.5	91.5	2nd	
2005	Division 1	6	3	2	0	1	36	83	2nd	
2006	Division 1	6	5	0	0	1	2	106	1st	Champions
2007	Division 1	6	5	0	0	1	0	135	1st	Champions
2008	Division 1	6	4	1	0	1	5	91	2nd	
2009	Division 1	10	10	0	0	0	0	200	1st	Champions
2010	Division 1	10	7	3	0	0	62	132	2nd	
2011	Division 1	10	7	1	0	2	56	126	1st	Champions
2012	Division 1	8	3	0	0	5	24	54	1st	Champions
2013	Division 1	8	6	2	0	0	47	107	3rd	
2014	Division 1	8	6	0	0	2	48	108	1st	Champions
2015	Division 1	8	5	1	1	1	51	105	2nd	
2016	Division 1	8	7	1	0	0	63	133	1st	Champions
2017	Division 1	7	3	4	0	0	41	71	6th	
2018	Division 1	7	4	3	0	0	43	83	3rd	
2019	Division 1	7	6	1	0	0	46	106	1st	Champions

=== Women's Twenty20 Cup ===
Season	Division	P	W	L	T	Ab	NRR	Pts	Pos	Notes
2009	Division 1	3	1	1	0	1	+0.97	3	2nd	
2010	Division S1	3	3	0	0	0	+2.87	6	1st	Semi-final
2011	Division S1	3	3	0	0	0	2.17	6	1st	Champions
2012	Division S1	3	2	0	0	1	+2.23	5	2nd	Semi-final
2013	Division S1	3	2	1	0	0	+0.99	4	2nd	Champions
2014	Division 1B	4	3	1	0	0	+2.28	12	3rd	
2015	Division 1	8	6	2	0	0	−0.10	24	3rd	
2016	Division 1	7	5	2	0	0	+0.43	20	1st	Champions
2017	Division 1	8	4	4	0	0	−0.38	16	6th	
2018	Division 1	8	5	3	0	0	+0.67	20	3rd	
2019	Division 1	8	4	2	0	2	+0.04	18	3rd	
2021	South East	8	6	0	0	2	+1.30	26	1st	Group winners
2022	Group 6	6	4	2	0	0	+1.19	16	2nd	Lost final
2023	Group 6	6	2	0	0	4	+3.31	12	2nd	Shared group winners
2024	Group 3	8	2	4	0	2	−0.32	54	7th	

=== ECB Women's County One-Day ===
Season	Group	League standings								Notes
Season	Group	P	W	L	T	A/C	BP	Pts	Pos	Notes
2024	Group 4	4	2	1	0	1	2	11	3rd	

== Honours ==
- Women's Area Championship:
  - Champions (2) – 1986, 1987
- County Championship:
  - Division One champions (8) – 2006, 2007, 2009, 2011, 2012, 2014, 2016, 2019
- Women's Twenty20 Cup:
  - Champions (3) – 2011, 2013, 2016
  - Group winners (1) – 2021; shared (1): 2023

== See also ==
- Kent County Cricket Club
- South East Stars
