= Newport International Sports Village =

Sport complex in Newport, Wales

Coordinates: 51.5716°N 2.9589°W

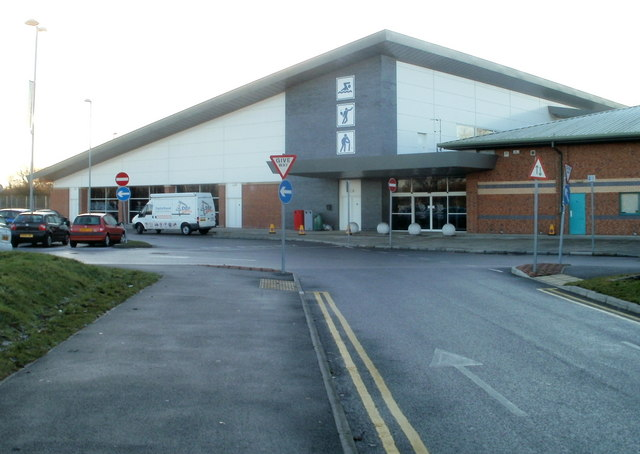
Swimming pool and multi sport Tennis Centre

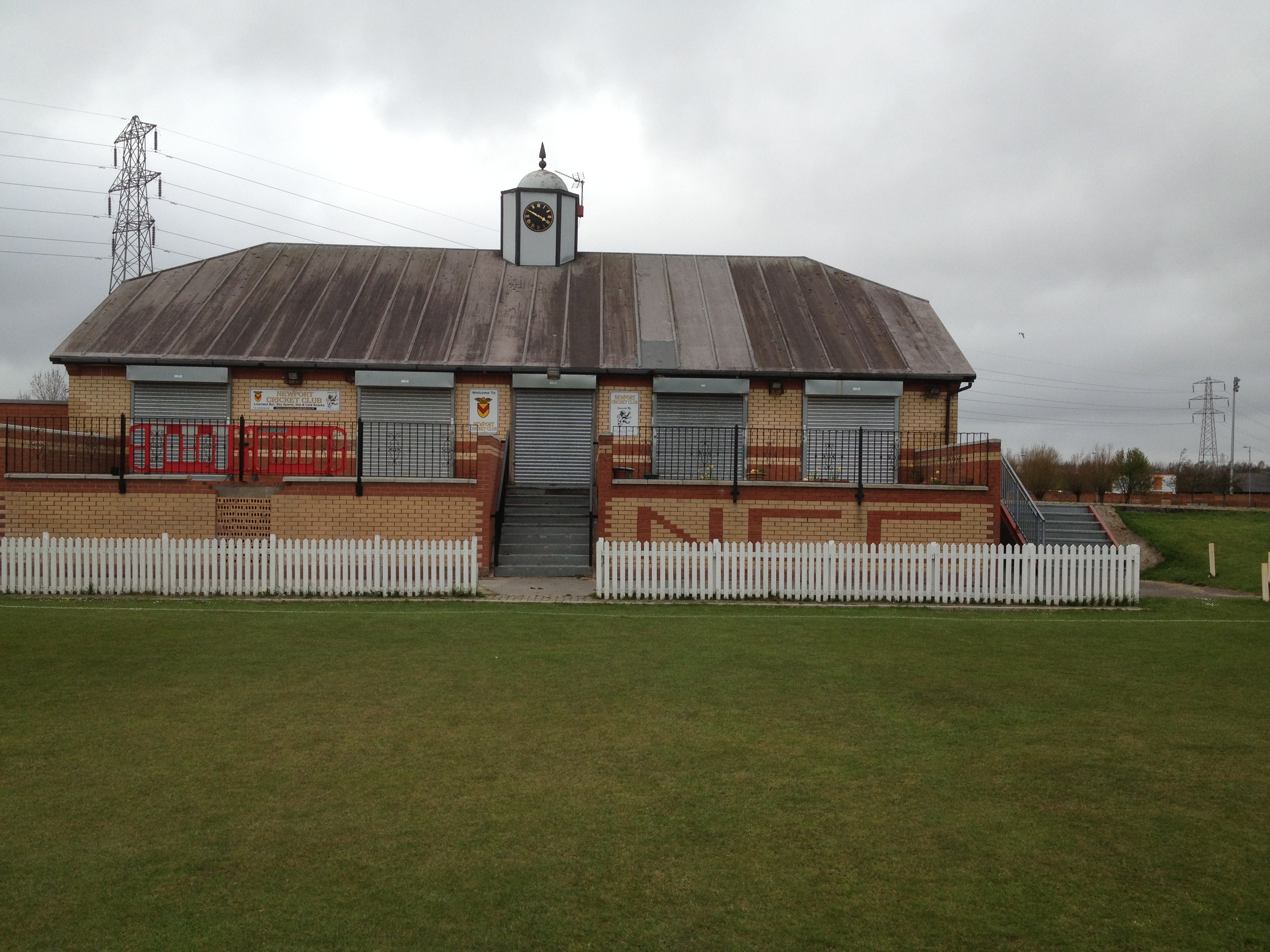
Newport Cricket Club Pavilion

Newport International Sports Village is a multi-sport complex located at Lliswerry in the southeast of the city of Newport, South Wales. It is known locally as Spytty Park, the name coming from the original Spytty Fields on which it is built.

The complex includes a football development centre, athletics/football stadium, velodrome and attached cycle speedway track, tennis centre, swimming pool and cricket pitches. The tennis centre is a multi sport facility.

The velodrome was used by the Great Britain track cycling team as their exclusive base for their final preparations for the 2012 Summer Olympics. It had previously been used by the team for the 2004 and 2008 Summer Olympics.

== Facilities ==
=== Newport Stadium ===
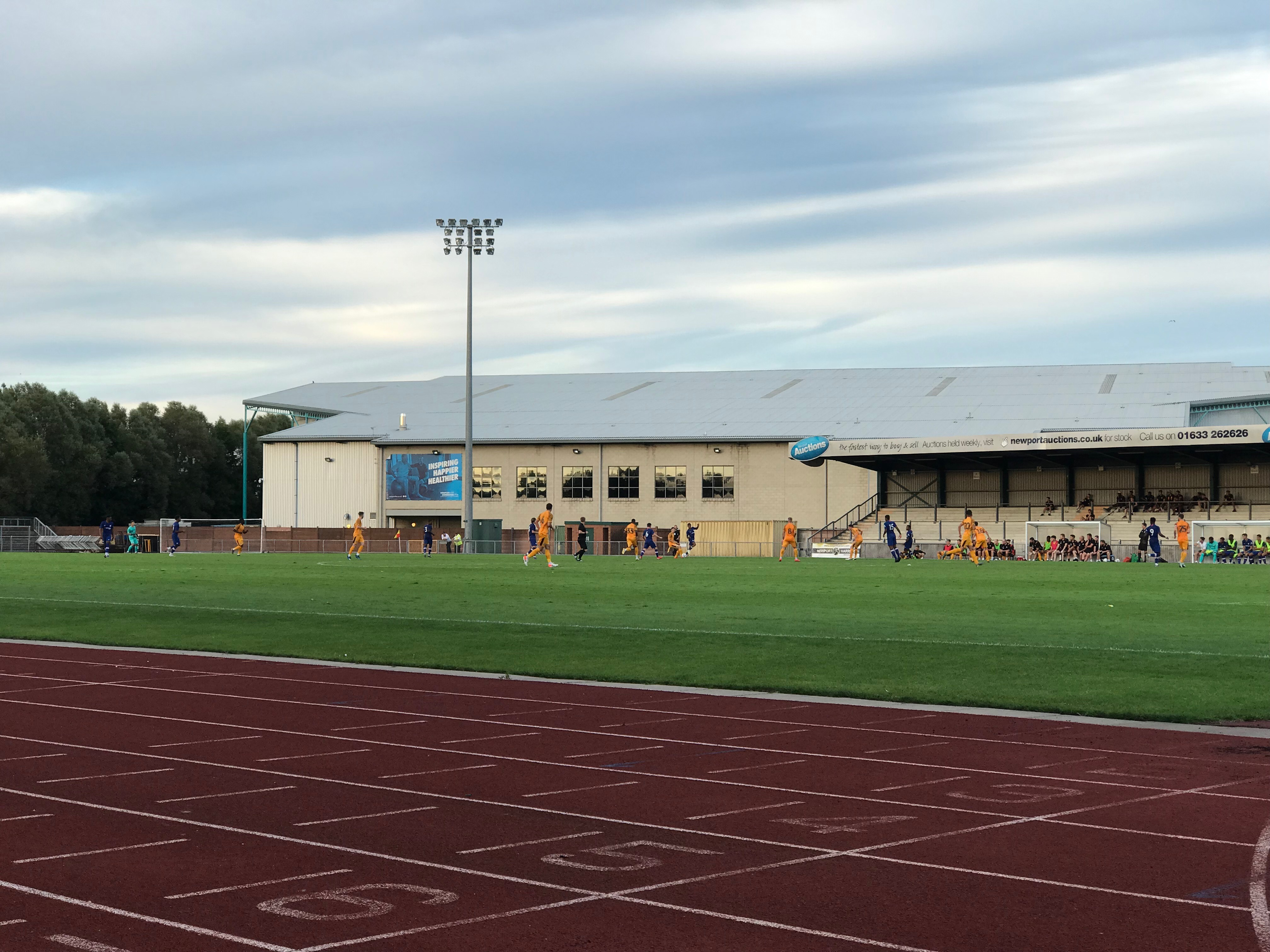
Newport Stadium friendly between Newport County A.F.C. and Chelsea F.C.

Newport Stadium is the primary athletics venue in Newport. It is also a Conference National standard football stadium, being the former home ground of Newport County A.F.C. The stadium is used by Llanwern A.F.C. and Newport Harriers Athletic Club. It is owned and managed by Newport City Council.

=== South East Wales Regional Swimming Pool ===
The pool was built to replace the art deco Maindee baths as Newport's senior competition pool. The pool is a 25-metre, 8-lane competition pool with a movable floor. There is also a training pool (20m x 7m) that backs onto the main pool and over 500 seats for spectators in the main pool.

=== Newport Tennis Centre ===
The tennis centre is one of the original buildings in the complex. When the pool was built, it was built onto the existing centre. The tennis centre is a facility for tennis (indoor and outdoor). It also boasts a gym in its Ancillary Hall.

=== Cricket pitches ===
The village has two cricket pitches and has been the home of Newport Cricket Club since 1990. A pavilion separates the two pitches with a small seating area in the pavilion looking onto one pitch. Cricket nets were installed behind the astroturf in 2003-04 for the summer months. There are also cricket nets in the tennis centre for the winter.

The ground was the venue for Glamorgan County Cricket Club's home County Championship match against Gloucestershire in May 2019, the first time that Newport had hosted a match in the competition since 1965 and the first county match at the current ground. County cricket was previously played at Rodney Parade until the 1990s.

== Former facilities ==
=== Newport City Skate Park ===
The concrete skate park was opened in October 2008 at a construction cost of over £200,000. It was designed in consultation with local skate boarders and Newport Youth Council to meet the needs of both beginners and experienced skate boarders. In 2012 it was closed and relocated to Tredegar Park on the west side of the city in preparation for the construction of the Football Development Centre.

== See also ==
- Cardiff International Sports Village
- Newport Centre (Wales)
