= 2019 Women's County Championship =

English cricket tournament

- Administrator(s): England and Wales Cricket Board
- Cricket format: 50 over
- Tournament format(s): League system
- Champions: Kent (8th title)
- Participants: 35
- Most runs: Sophia Dunkley (451)
- Most wickets: Katie Thompson (15); Natalie Rowbottom (15); Rebecca Silk (15); Beth Langston (15)

The 2019 Women's County One-Day Championship was the 23rd cricket Women's County Championship season. It ran from late April to the beginning of June and saw 32 county teams and teams representing Scotland, Wales and the Netherlands compete in a series of divisions. Kent Women won the County Championship as winners of the top division with Yorkshire finishing runners-up. This is the record eighth Championship for Kent.

The tournament was followed by the 2019 Women's Twenty20 Cup and then by the 2019 Women's Cricket Super League, a professional tournament competed for by franchise teams.

== Competition format ==
Teams played matches within a series of divisions with the winners of the top division being crowned County Champions. Matches were played using a one day format with 50 overs per side.

The championship works on a points system with positions within the divisions being based on the total points. Points were awarded as follows:

Win: 10 points + bonus points.
Tie: 5 points + bonus points.
Loss: Bonus points.
Abandoned: 5 points.
Cancelled: Match not counted to average.
Conceded: -5 points for the side conceding, 18 points for their opponent.

Bonus points are collected for batting and bowling. The bonus points for each match are retained if the match is completed.

- Batting

1.50 runs per over (RPO) or more: 1 point
2 RPO or more: 2 points
3 RPO or more: 3 points
4 RPO or more: 4 points

- Bowling

3-4 wickets taken: 1 point
5-6 wickets taken: 2 points
7-8 wickets taken: 3 points
9-10 wickets taken: 4 points

== Teams ==
The 2019 Championship was divided into three divisions: Division One and Division Two with eight teams each, and Division Three with 19 teams divided into three groups of six or five teams. Teams in all divisions played each other once.

Division One	Hampshire	Kent	Lancashire	Nottinghamshire	Surrey	Sussex	Warwickshire	Yorkshire
Division Two	Berkshire	Devon	Durham	Essex	Middlesex	Somerset	Wales	Worcestershire
Division Three – Group A	Cumbria	Derbyshire	Leicestershire and Rutland	Lincolnshire	Northumberland	Scotland	Staffordshire	
Division Three – Group B	Cambridgeshire and Huntingdonshire	Hertfordshire	Netherlands	Norfolk	Northamptonshire	Suffolk		
Division Three – Group C	Buckinghamshire	Cornwall	Dorset	Gloucestershire	Oxfordshire	Wiltshire		

== Division One ==
Team	Pld	W	L	T	A	C	Bat	Bowl	Ded	Pts
Kent (C)	7	6	1	0	0	0	23	23	0	106
Yorkshire	7	5	2	0	0	0	20	23	0	93
Sussex	7	4	3	0	0	0	19	26	0	85
Lancashire	7	4	3	0	0	0	24	18	0	82
Hampshire	7	3	4	0	0	0	23	27	0	80
Nottinghamshire	7	3	4	0	0	0	23	22	0	75
Surrey (R)	7	2	5	0	0	0	20	19	0	59
Warwickshire (R)	7	1	6	0	0	0	22	18	0	50

As of 2 June 2019 — Source: ECB Women's County Championship

== Division Two ==
Team	Pld	W	L	T	A	C	Bat	Bowl	Ded	Pts
Middlesex (P)	7	5	1	1	0	0	24	23	0	102
Berkshire (P)	7	5	1	0	1	0	19	24	0	98
Essex	7	5	2	0	0	0	19	24	0	94
Devon	7	4	2	0	1	0	19	20	0	84
Wales	7	3	3	1	0	0	23	20	0	78
Worcestershire	7	2	5	0	0	0	14	19	0	53
Somerset (R)	7	1	6	0	0	0	19	24	0	53
Durham (R)	7	1	6	0	0	0	19	17	0	46

As of 14 July 2019 — Source: ECB Women's County Championship

== Division Three ==
=== Group A ===
Team	Pld	W	L	T	A	Ca	Co	Bat	Bowl	Ded	Pts
Staffordshire (P)	6	6	0	0	0	0	0	22	24	0	106
Derbyshire	6	5	1	0	0	0	0	16	16	0	90
Leicestershire and Rutland	6	4	2	0	0	0	0	19	23	0	82
Lincolnshire	6	2	4	0	0	0	0	12	19	0	51
Cumbria	6	2	3	0	0	1	0	14	9	0	43
Scotland	6	1	5	0	0	0	0	14	13	0	37
Northumberland	6	0	4	0	0	1	1	6	7	0	8

As of 2 June 2019 — Source: ECB Women's County Championship

=== Group B ===
Team	Pld	W	L	T	A	C	Bat	Bowl	Ded	Pts
Northamptonshire (P)	5	5	0	0	0	0	18	18	0	86
Netherlands	5	3	2	0	0	0	18	14	0	62
Norfolk	5	3	2	0	0	0	15	12	0	57
Hertfordshire	5	2	3	0	0	0	13	14	0	47
Suffolk	5	2	3	0	0	0	14	11	0	45
Cambridgeshire and Huntingdonshire	5	0	5	0	0	0	9	5	0	14

As of 27 May 2019 — Source: ECB Women's County Championship

=== Group C ===
Team	Pld	W	L	T	A	C	Bat	Bowl	Ded	Pts
Oxfordshire (P)	5	5	0	0	0	0	20	20	0	90
Buckinghamshire	5	4	1	0	0	0	15	15	0	70
Cornwall	5	2	2	0	1	0	11	14	0	50
Gloucestershire	5	2	3	0	0	0	16	14	0	50
Dorset	5	1	3	0	1	0	5	10	0	30
Wiltshire	5	0	5	0	0	0	8	6	0	14

As of 27 May 2019 — Source: ECB Women's County Championship

== Statistics ==
=== Most runs ===
Player	Team	Matches	Innings	Runs	Average	HS	100s	50s
Sophia Dunkley	Middlesex	6	6	451	112.75	138	2	3
Heather Knight	Berkshire	4	4	403	134.33	159*	2	1
Bryony Smith	Surrey	6	6	347	57.83	106	1	2
Amy Jones	Warwickshire	6	6	302	60.40	101*	1	2
Rachel Priest	Wales	7	7	282	40.28	84	0	3

Source: CricketArchive

=== Most wickets ===
Player	Team	Balls	Wickets	Average	BBI	5w
Katie Thompson	Yorkshire	329	15	8.40	3/15	0
Natalie Rowbottom	Lincolnshire	312	15	10.20	6/18	1
Rebecca Silk	Devon	334	15	11.20	5/12	1
Beth Langston	Yorkshire	348	15	13.00	5/8	1
Mollie Robbins	Gloucestershire	252	14	10.71	5/19	1

Source: CricketArchive
