= Women's London Championship =

English women's cricket competition

- Countries: England
- Administrator: ECB
- Format: One Day
- First edition: 2020
- Latest edition: 2024
- Tournament format: Round robin
- Number of teams: 5
- Current champion: Middlesex (1st title)
- Most successful: Surrey (2 titles)
- Website: Women's London Championship

The Women's London Championship (WLC) is an English women's cricket competition. It was created in 2020 following the introduction of the regional Rachael Heyhoe Flint Trophy as the highest domestic competition in women's One Day cricket. The competition features the women's county cricket teams from the Home Counties.

== History ==
Originally the Women's County Championship was the highest 50 over competition in English women's cricket. However, the tournament ended in 2019 to make way for a regionalised 50-over tournament and The Hundred. This decision was not popular with some of the county teams who felt that the new competition had removed their representation in the top flight of women's cricket. The Women's London Championship was created as a county replacement. The first season in 2020 featured the Home Counties of Kent, Middlesex, Surrey and Essex. Though it was endorsed by the England and Wales Cricket Board (ECB), it was viewed as a breakaway tournament due to a negative perception of the ECB's way of administering women's cricket by reducing the number of teams from counties to regions. The counties also engaged in a running competition as a warmup. The matches would be played at county outgrounds such as Kent playing at the Nevill Ground, Royal Tunbridge Wells and Middlesex playing at Mill Hill School, London. The inaugural competition was won by Surrey.

For the 2021 season, it was announced that Sussex would be joining the competition. The South East Stars and Sunrisers regional teams agreed to release their contracted players to represent their counties in the Women's London Championship. Kent won the 2021 tournament, winning three of their four matches, with defending champions Surrey in second place. Surrey regained their title in 2022, winning three of their four matches (with the other match cancelled). Essex won their first title in 2023, winning all four of their matches. Middlesex won their first title in 2024, winning all of their matches.

== Teams ==
Team	First	Titles
Essex	2020	1
Kent	2020	1
Middlesex	2020	1
Surrey	2020	2
Sussex	2021	0
