= England women's cricket team in Australia and New Zealand in 1968–69 =

England women's cricket team in Australia in 1968–69
	Australia	England
- Dates: 13 December 1968 – 30 January 1969
Captains	Muriel Picton	Rachael Heyhoe Flint

Test series
- Result: 3-match series drawn 0–0
Most runs	Lynn Denholm (203)	Rachael Heyhoe Flint (269)
Most wickets	Anne Gordon (16)	Lesley Clifford (10)

The England women's cricket team toured Australia and New Zealand between December 1968 and March 1969. England played three Test matches against Australia, played for the Women's Ashes. The series was drawn 0–0, meaning that England, as the current holders, retained the Ashes. After their tour of Australia, England toured New Zealand, playing a three Test series which England won 2–0.

== Tour of Australia ==
=== Squads ===
Australia	England
Muriel Picton (c); Elaine Bray; Lynn Denholm; Joyce Goldsmith; Anne Gordon; Miriam Knee; Lorraine Kutcher; Patsy May; Jillian Need; Dawn Newman; Janice Parker; Olive Smith (wk); Margaret Wilson	Rachael Heyhoe Flint (c); Enid Bakewell; Edna Barker; Jean Clark; Lesley Clifford; Jill Cruwys; Heather Dewdney; Audrey Disbury; Carol Evans; Val Hesmondhalgh; Shirley Hodges (wk); June Stephenson; Mary Pilling; Sheila Plant (wk); Anne Sanders; Lynne Thomas; Chris Watmough

=== Tour Matches ===
==== 2-day matches ====
13 – 14 December 1968
Scorecard

England	v	Western Australia
228/5d (55 overs); Audrey Disbury 106 (–); Diane Marks 3/50 (14 overs)		82 (42.6 overs); Sue Metcalf 31 (–); Enid Bakewell 5/23 (12 overs)
		107 (53.5 overs) (f/o); Janice Law-Davis 28 (–); Enid Bakewell 5/39 (18.5 overs)

England Women won by an innings and 39 runs
Rosalie Park, Perth
Umpires: D Pereira (Aus) and S Power (Aus)

- Western Australia Women won the toss and elected to field.

16 – 17 December 1968
Scorecard

England	v	Australia Combined XI
201/9d (53 overs); June Stephenson 45 (–); D Wadey 3/54 (14 overs)		208/8d (83 overs); Margaret Pickles 63 (–); Mary Pilling 2/24 (10 overs)
177/5 (44 overs); Rachael Heyhoe Flint 103* (–); D Wadey 2/16 (9 overs)

Match drawn
WACA Ground, Perth
Umpires: D Pereira (Aus) and Harris (Aus)

- Australia Combined XI Women won the toss and elected to field.

20 – 21 December 1968
Scorecard

England	v	South Australia
181 (58.1 overs); Shirley Hodges 40 (–); D Wadey 3/16 (8 overs)		88 (36.4 overs); Jan Lumsden 38 (–); June Stephenson 3/10 (8.4 overs)
134/3d (34 overs); Enid Bakewell 60* (–); Jillian Need 2/19 (8 overs)		113 (45.5 overs); K Beer 16 (–); Anne Sanders 3/17 (9 overs)

England Women won by 114 runs
Angaston Oval, Angaston
Umpires: Taylor (Aus) and Winter (Aus)

- England Women won the toss and elected to bat.

3 – 4 January 1969
Scorecard

England	v	Victoria
193/6d (51.6 overs); Enid Bakewell 59 (–); Lesley Clifford 1/40 (12 overs)		181/3d (46 overs); Dawn Rae 57 (–); Lesley Clifford 1/40 (12 overs)
187/6d (57 overs); Audrey Disbury 56 (–); Elaine Bray 2/38 (9 overs)		60 (29.3 overs); Lynn Denholm 20 (–); Enid Bakewell 7/28 (11.3 overs)

England Women won by 139 runs
Junction Oval, Melbourne
Umpires: L Beet (Aus) and J Williams (Aus)

- Victoria Women won the toss and elected to field.

6 – 7 January 1969
Scorecard

England	v	Victoria Select XI
205/8d (53 overs); Audrey Disbury 41 (–); Lesley Johnston 3/62 (13 overs)		116 (59.4 overs); Shirley Banfield 38 (–); Lesley Clifford 5/29 (19 overs)
102/6d (22.6 overs); Lynne Thomas 42 (–); Lesley Johnston 4/25 (5.6 overs)		123/7 (49 overs); Jenny Howe 32 (–); Jean Clark 2/11 (5 overs)

Match drawn
Carey Grammar School Oval No. 1, Melbourne
Umpires: Davies (Aus) and J Williams (Aus)

- England Women won the toss and elected to bat.

18 – 19 January 1969
Scorecard

New South Wales	v	England
136 (49 overs); Joyce Dalton 36 (–); Enid Bakewell 8/38 (13 overs)		217/8d (66 overs); Lynne Thomas 62 (–); Wendy Weir 2/48 (14 overs)
142 (52.5 overs); Helen Waite 39 (–); Enid Bakewell 4/58 (16 overs)		62/4 (18.5 overs); Anne Sanders 16 (–); Patsy May 2/36 (9.5 overs)

England Women won by 6 wickets
WD & HO Wills Ground, Sydney
Umpires: David Frede (Aus) and A MacDonald (Aus)

- New South Wales Women won the toss and elected to bat.

==== 1-day single innings matches ====
24 December 1968
Scorecard

South Australia; 160/7d (55.5 overs)	v	England; 108/7 (42 overs)
Margaret Jude 53 (–); Enid Bakewell 3/32 (13.5 overs)		Audrey Disbury 48 (–); Joan Poynter 2/11 (4 overs)

Match drawn
Adelaide Teachers College Oval, Adelaide
Umpires: SA Anderson (Aus) and Gregory (Aus)

- England Women won the toss and elected to field.

2 January 1969
Scorecard

England; 196/4d (40.4 overs)	v	Victoria Junior; 93 (52.3 overs)
Lynne Thomas 79 (–); A Wilson 1/12 (3 overs)		A Small 21 (–); Anne Sanders 3/17 (11 overs)

England Women won by 103 runs
Carey Grammar School Oval No. 1, Melbourne
Umpires: L Beet (Aus) and R Marsden (Aus)

- Victoria Junior Women won the toss and elected to field.

16 January 1969
Scorecard

England; 202/6d (43 overs)	v	New South Wales Combined XI; 137 (54.3 overs)
Audrey Disbury 68 (–); K Gordon 2/71 (16 overs)		Y Grigg 61* (–); Enid Bakewell 4/25 (10 overs)

England Women won by 65 runs
Seiffert Oval, Goulburn
Umpires: Maher (Aus) and Moroney (Aus)

- New South Wales Combined XI Women won the toss and elected to field.

22 January 1969
Scorecard

New South Wales Metropolitan; 126 (49.4 overs)	v	England; 127/3 (37.4 overs)
Denise Eggleton 38 (–); Enid Bakewell 5/40 (11 overs)		Anne Sanders 49 (–); Joyce Christ 1/15 (4 overs)

England Women won by 7 wickets
Manly Oval, Sydney
Umpires: Lanigan (Aus) and A MacDonald (Aus)

- New South Wales Metropolitan Women won the toss and elected to bat.

30 January 1969
Scorecard

New South Wales President's XI; 135 (38.4 overs)	v	England; 139/4 (31.3 overs)
Joyce Dalton 58 (–); June Stephenson 3/16 (7 overs)		Sheila Plant 37 (–); S Mitchell 2/9 (5 overs)

England Women won by 6 wickets
University Oval, Sydney
Umpires: Seede (Aus) and A MacDonald (Aus)

- England Women won the toss and elected to field.

=== Test Series ===
==== 1st Test ====
27 – 30 December 1968
Scorecard

England	v	Australia
270 (81 overs); Enid Bakewell 113 (–); Miriam Knee 5/49 (22 overs)		339/7d (134 overs); Lynn Denholm 93 (–); Lesley Clifford 2/55 (31 overs)
192/7 (65 overs); Rachael Heyhoe Flint 68 (–); Miriam Knee 3/19 (17 overs)

Match drawn
Barton Oval, Adelaide
Umpires: R Edwards (Aus) and L Langton (Aus)

- England Women won the toss and elected to bat.
- Enid Bakewell, Jean Clark, Carol Evans, Chris Watmough (Eng), Elaine Bray, Joyce Goldsmith, Anne Gordon, Patsy May, Jillian Need and Dawn Newman (Aus) all made their WTest debuts.

==== 2nd Test ====
10 – 13 January 1969
Scorecard

England	v	Australia
254/8d (85 overs); Edna Barker 100 (–); Anne Gordon 5/61 (28 overs)		216 (87.5 overs); Miriam Knee 96 (–); Enid Bakewell 4/49 (24.5 overs)
143/7d (71.5 overs); June Stephenson 39* (–); Anne Gordon 5/57 (28 overs)		108/5 (37 overs); Janice Parker 35*; Chris Watmough 1/2 (1 over)

Match drawn
Junction Oval, Melbourne
Umpires: L Beet (Aus) and J Williams (Aus)

- England Women won the toss and elected to bat.
- Shirley Hodges (Eng) made her WTest debut.

==== 3rd Test ====
25 – 28 January 1969
Scorecard

Australia	v	England
213 (75.6 overs); Dawn Newman 54 (–); Lesley Clifford 5/51 (20 overs)		193 (89 overs); Rachael Heyhoe Flint 59 (–); Lorraine Kutcher 5/49 (20 overs)
210/3d (58 overs); Elaine Bray 69* (–); Heather Dewdney 1/22 (4 overs)		155/6 (52 overs); June Stephenson 59*; Miriam Knee 3/34 (16 overs)

Match drawn
North Sydney Oval, Sydney
Umpires: Paul Berridge (Aus) and RF Burgess (Aus)

- Australia Women won the toss and elected to bat.
- Heather Dewdney (Eng) and Margaret Wilson (Aus) made their WTest debuts.

== Tour of New Zealand ==
England women's cricket team in New Zealand in 1968–69
	New Zealand	England
- Dates: 7 February – 28 March 1969
Captains	Trish McKelvey	Rachael Heyhoe Flint

Test series
- Result: England won the 3-match series 2–0
Most runs	Judi Doull (240)	Enid Bakewell (412)
Most wickets	Jos Burley (8)	Enid Bakewell (19)

=== Squads ===
New Zealand	England
Trish McKelvey (c); Judi Doull; Ann McKenna; Janice Stead; Shirley Cowles; Wendy Coe; Bev Brentnall (wk); Jill Saulbrey; Carol Oyler; Vera Burt; Jos Burley; Jackie Lord; Pat Carrick; Louise Clough; Jenny Olson	Rachael Heyhoe Flint (c); Enid Bakewell; Edna Barker; Jean Clark; Lesley Clifford; Jill Cruwys; Heather Dewdney; Audrey Disbury; Carol Evans; Val Hesmondhalgh; Shirley Hodges (wk); June Stephenson; Mary Pilling; Sheila Plant (wk); Anne Sanders; Lynne Thomas; Chris Watmough

=== Tour Matches ===
==== 2-day matches ====
7 – 8 February 1969
Scorecard

England	v	Auckland
259/7d (102 overs); Lynne Thomas 70* (–); Joyce Stevens 4/91 (43 overs)		149 (100.5 overs); Rona McKenzie 43 (–); Lynne Thomas 4/22 (17.5 overs)
2/0 (0.2 overs); Sheila Plant 2* (–)		110 (81 overs) (f/o); Rona McKenzie 59 (–); Enid Bakewell 4/22 (25 overs)

England Women won by 10 wickets
Melville Park, Auckland
Umpires: Brunt (NZ) and Ernie McLeod (Aus)

- Auckland Women won the toss and elected to field.

11 – 12 February 1969
Scorecard

England	v	Wellington
305/5d (80 overs); Edna Barker 98 (–); Jill Saulbrey 3/81 (27 overs)		174 (96 overs); Barbara Bevege 54 (–); Enid Bakewell 4/21 (17 overs)
62/1 (8 overs); Rachael Heyhoe Flint 42 (–); Wendy Coe 1/20 (4 overs)		187/4d (67 overs) (f/o); Wendy Coe 83 (–); Jill Cruwys 1/18 (4 overs)

England Women won by 9 wickets
Hutt Recreation Ground, Lower Hutt

- England Women won the toss and elected to bat.

21 – 22 February 1969
Scorecard

England	v	Otago
307/5d (79 overs); Audrey Disbury 119 (–); Elaine Stevens 2/56 (10 overs)		53 (44.2 overs); Janet Coates 12 (–); Enid Bakewell 8/16 (16.2 overs)
		78 (62.3 overs) (f/o); Liz Flett 20 (–); Enid Bakewell 5/25 (17.3 overs)

England Women won by an innings and 176 runs
Logan Park, Dunedin
Umpires: JW Campbell (NZ) and HM Patterson (NZ)

- England Women won the toss and elected to bat.

26 – 27 February 1969
Scorecard

England	v	Canterbury
269 (78 overs); Enid Bakewell 92 (–); Jenny Olson 5/51 (27 overs)		119 (53.2 overs); Phyl Blackler 31 (–); Heather Dewdney 3/19 (6 overs)
21/0 (9 overs); June Stephenson 13* (–)		170 (88.5 overs) (f/o); Shirley Cowles 71 (–); Enid Bakewell 6/51 (30.5 overs)

England Women won by 10 wickets
Hagley Oval, Christchurch
Umpires: Bal Dennison (NZ) and Lewis Johnston (NZ)

- England Women won the toss and elected to bat.

1, 3 March 1969
Scorecard

New Zealand President's XI	v	England
190 (96 overs); Judi Doull 90 (–); Carol Evans 2/11 (9 overs)		243/4d (63 overs); Rachael Heyhoe Flint 100* (–); Ann McKenna 2/42 (8 overs)
154/9d (73.5 overs); Janice Stead 48 (–); Carol Evans 3/26 (17 overs)		58/1 (10 overs); Jill Cruwys 33* (–); Maureen Peters 1/8 (2 overs)

Match drawn
Ashburton Domain, Ashburton
Umpires: Bob Blain (NZ) and Gavin Wainscott (NZ)

- England Women won the toss and elected to field.

15, 17 March 1969
Scorecard

North Shore	v	England
122 (91.5 overs); Jackie Lord 27 (–); Enid Bakewell 5/33 (26.5 overs)		190/2d (61 overs); Rachael Heyhoe Flint 110* (–); Jos Burley 1/71 (24 overs)
55 (41.5 overs); Vera Burt 16 (–); Carol Evans 7/25 (16 overs)

England Women won by an innings and 13 runs
Devonport Domain, Auckland
Umpires: Jack Annan (NZ) and Hugh Stratford (NZ)

- North Shore Women won the toss and elected to bat.

==== 1-day matches ====
12 March 1969
Scorecard

Southern Districts	v	England
49 (30.5 overs); Margaret Turner 14* (–); Mary Pilling 4/19 (10 overs)		175/2d (43 overs); Sheila Plant 103* (–); Carol Marett 2/22 (10 overs)
149/6 (43 overs); Georgie Taylor 59* (–); Lesley Clifford 3/17 (8 overs)

Match drawn
Trafalgar Park, Nelson
Umpires: Mansfield Rangi (NZ) and Bill Tindale (NZ)

- England Women won the toss and elected to field.

19 March 1969
Scorecard

England; 180/9d (68.4 overs)	v	Northern Districts Invitation XI; 65 (46.4 overs)
Heather Dewdney 43 (–); Glenys Page 5/56 (25.4 overs)		Lynda Prichard 18 (–); Enid Bakewell 8/14 (15.4 overs)

England Women won by 115 runs
Seddon Park, Hamilton
Umpires: A Black (NZ) and Terry Kelly (NZ)

- Northern Districts Invitation XI Women won the toss and elected to field.

25 March 1969
Scorecard

England; 184 (36.1 overs)	v	Silver Fern; 184/8 (58 overs)
Jean Clark 42 (–); Betty Maker 2/32 (7 overs)		Rona McKenzie 41 (–); Sheila Plant 3/14 (9 overs)

Match tied
Stanley Bay, Auckland
Umpires: Bev Brentnall (NZ) and Trish McKelvey (NZ)

- Silver Fern Women won the toss and elected to field.

=== Test Series ===
==== 1st Test ====
15 – 18 February 1969
Scorecard

New Zealand	v	England
302 (138.5 overs); Trish McKelvey 155* (–); Enid Bakewell 5/40 (41.5 overs)		340/7d (143.2 overs); Enid Bakewell 124 (–); Wendy Coe 2/44 (31.2 overs)
4/0 (4.4 overs); Judi Doull 3* (–)

Match drawn
Basin Reserve, Wellington
Umpires: Bob Bundle (NZ) and Robert Monteith (NZ)

- New Zealand Women won the toss and elected to bat.
- Jill Cruwys (Eng) and Louise Clough (NZ) made their WTest debuts.

==== 2nd Test ====
7 – 10 March 1969
Scorecard

New Zealand	v	England
282/9d (122.3 overs); Judi Doull 103 (–); Enid Bakewell 3/68 (31.3 overs)		296/7d (106.1 overs); Enid Bakewell 114 (–); Jackie Lord 2/30 (8 overs)
186 (94.3 overs); Shirley Cowles 46 (–); Enid Bakewell 5/56 (36.3 overs)		173/3 (42.3 overs); Enid Bakewell 66*; Jill Saulbrey 2/81 (21 overs)

England Women won by 7 wickets
Hagley Oval, Christchurch
Umpires: Bal Dennison (NZ) and Leslie Moore (NZ)

- New Zealand Women won the toss and elected to bat.
- Jenny Olson, Pat Carrick and Shirley Cowles (NZ) all made their WTest debuts.

==== 3rd Test ====
28 – 31 March 1969
Scorecard

England	v	New Zealand
293/9d (110.3 overs); Rachael Heyhoe Flint 88 (–); Jos Burley 4/62 (30.3 overs)		192 (112.3 overs); Shirley Cowles 41 (–); Mary Pilling 4/53 (32 overs)
150/4d (54 overs); Enid Bakewell 56 (–); Pat Carrick 3/41 (14 overs)		214 (68.3 overs); Judi Doull 75 (–); Carol Evans 4/45 (19 overs)

England Women won by 37 runs
Cornwall Park, Auckland
Umpires: Bill Sewell (NZ) and Ken Parris (NZ)

- England Women won the toss and elected to bat.
- Ann McKenna (NZ) made her WTest debut.
