= ICC Women's Player Rankings =

International cricket player rankings

The International Cricket Council player rankings is a widely followed system of rankings for international cricketers based on their recent performances.

Thought the men's ratings were developed in 1987, the women's ratings were first introduce for WODI matches in 2008 in response to the formats growing popularity. Currently, 10 teams are considered for WODI ratings, whereas all association members of the ICC are eligible for WT20I ratings. The rankings include the top 10 WODI and WT20I batsmen, bowlers and all-rounders based on the rating of the each player.

== Ranking calculations ==
For the ICC player ranking, the same methods are used for both men and women. The player rankings are a points methods of all player's performance. with recent matches performance effect player's rank. Each match performance is given a rating out of 1000. But 1000 rating was rare achievement. This means that the maximum possible overall rating per person only rating 1000, and a player gaining a rating of 900 is seen as an exceptional achievement. Separate lists are maintained for batting and bowling and an all-rounder rating is also published, which is obtained by multiplying a player's batting and bowling rating together and dividing by 1000.

For batting, the performance rating is based on a combination of runs scored, the rating of the opposition bowlers, match result and comparison to the overall scores in the match. A bowler gains points based on wickets taken, runs conceded and match result, with more points gained for dismissing highly rated batsmen. A damping-factor is applied to a player's rating at the start of their career.

== ODI rankings ==
=== Top 10 WODI batters ===
ICC Top 10 WODI Batters
Rank	Name	Rating
1	(South Africa) Laura Wolvaardt	782
2	(India) Smriti Mandhana	762
3	(Cricket West Indies) Hayley Matthews	731
4	(Australia) Beth Mooney	723
5	(Australia) Phoebe Litchfield	720
6	(Australia) Ashleigh Gardner	696
7	(New Zealand) Maddy Green	685
8	(India) Harmanpreet Kaur	676
9	(England) Nat Sciver-Brunt	672
10	(Australia) Ellyse Perry	664
Reference: ICC Women's ODI Batting Rankings, 2 November 2026

=== Top 10 WODI bowlers ===
ICC Top 10 WODI Bowlers
Rank	Name	Rating
1	(Australia) Alana King	743
2	(England) Sophie Ecclestone	696
3	(Australia) Ashleigh Gardner	692
4	(Australia) Megan Schutt	673
5	(Australia) Annabel Sutherland	667
6	(South Africa) Marizanne Kapp	650
7	(Cricket West Indies) Hayley Matthews	639
8	(India) Deepti Sharma	638
9	(Australia) Kim Garth	619
10	(Pakistan) Nashra Sandhu	601
Reference: ICC Women's ODI Bowler Rankings, 2 November 2026

=== Top 10 WODI all-rounders ===
ICC Top 10 WODI All-Rounders
Rank	Name	Rating
1	(Australia) Ashleigh Gardner	481
2	(Cricket West Indies) Hayley Matthews	467
3	(Australia) Annabel Sutherland	428
4	(India) Deepti Sharma	374
5	(South Africa) Marizanne Kapp	367
6	(New Zealand) Amelia Kerr	358
7	(Sri Lanka) Chamari Athapaththu	280
8	(Australia) Alana King	277
9	(England) Nat Sciver-Brunt	248
9	(England) Charlie Dean	248
Reference: ICC Women's ODI All-Rounder Rankings, 2 November 2026

== T20I rankings ==
=== Top 10 WT20I batters ===
ICC Top 10 WT20I Batters
Rank	Name	Rating
1	(Australia) Beth Mooney	787
2	(South Africa) Laura Wolvaardt	766
3	(India) Shafali Verma	759
4	(India) Smriti Mandhana	753
5	(Australia) Georgia Voll	746
6	(Sri Lanka) Chamari Athapaththu	735
7	(Cricket West Indies) Hayley Matthews	732
8	(New Zealand) Amelia Kerr	682
9	(Australia) Tahlia McGrath	665
10	(India) Harmanpreet Kaur	660
Reference: ICC Women's T20I Batting Rankings, 9 November 2026

=== Top 10 WT20I bowlers ===
ICC Top 10 WT20I Bowlers
Rank	Name	Rating
1	(India) Shree Charani	803
2	(India) Deepti Sharma	748
3	(England) Sophie Ecclestone	723
4	(England) Charlie Dean	722
5	(England) Lauren Bell	712
6	(England) Linsey Smith	704
7	(South Africa) Nonkululeko Mlaba	683
7	(Australia) Annabel Sutherland	683
9	(Pakistan) Nashra Sandhu	676
10	(Australia) Kim Garth	669
10	(Pakistan) Sadia Iqbal	669
Reference: ICC Women's T20I Bowling Rankings, 9 November 2026

=== Top 10 WT20I all-rounders ===
ICC Top 10 WT20I All-Rounders
Rank	Name	Rating
1	(Cricket West Indies) Hayley Matthews	472
2	(New Zealand) Amelia Kerr	436
3	(Sri Lanka) Chamari Athapaththu	413
4	(India) Deepti Sharma	382
5	(Ireland) Orla Prendergast	376
6	(Australia) Ashleigh Gardner	364
7	(Pakistan) Fatima Sana	336
8	(England) Sophie Ecclestone	272
9	(South Africa) Marizanne Kapp	260
10	(Scotland) Kathryn Bryce	256
10	(Australia) Georgia Wareham	256
Reference: ICC Women's T20I All-Rounder Rankings, 9 November 2026

== Historical rankings ==
=== Year end top ranked players in WODI cricket ===
Year	Top Batter	Country	Rating	Top Bowler	Country	Rating	Top All-rounder	Country	Rating
2025	Laura Wolvaardt (2)	South Africa	820	Sophie Ecclestone (4)	England	747	Ashleigh Gardner	Australia	498
2024	Laura Wolvaardt	South Africa	773	Sophie Ecclestone (3)	England	771	Marizanne Kapp (3)	South Africa	444
2023	Natalie Sciver-Brunt	England	807	Sophie Ecclestone (2)	England	746	Marizanne Kapp (2)	South Africa	394
2022	Alyssa Healy	Australia	785	Sophie Ecclestone	England	751	Ellyse Perry (5)	Australia	374
2021	Lizelle Lee	South Africa	761	Jess Jonassen (3)	Australia	760	Marizanne Kapp	South Africa	384
2020	Meg Lanning (4)	Australia	749	Jess Jonassen (2)	Australia	804	Ellyse Perry (4)	Australia	460
2019	Amy Satterthwaite	New Zealand	759	Jess Jonassen	Australia	755	Ellyse Perry (3)	Australia	523
2018	Ellyse Perry	Australia	681	Sana Mir	Pakistan	663	Ellyse Perry (2)	Australia	386
2017	Mithali Raj (6)	India	753	Marizanne Kapp	South Africa	656	Ellyse Perry	Australia	404
2016	Meg Lanning (3)	Australia	804	Jhulan Goswami (3)	India	687	Stafanie Taylor (6)	West Indies	377
2015	Meg Lanning (2)	Australia	796	Jhulan Goswami (3)	India	765	Stafanie Taylor (5)	West Indies	454
2014	Meg Lanning	Australia	703	Stafanie Taylor (2)	West Indies	711	Stafanie Taylor (4)	West Indies	479
2013	Mithali Raj (5)	India	727	Stafanie Taylor	West Indies	733	Stafanie Taylor (3)	West Indies	498
2012	Mithali Raj (4)	India	767	Katherine Brunt	England	777	Stafanie Taylor (2)	West Indies	442
2011	Mithali Raj (3)	India	758	Jhulan Goswami (2)	India	761	Stafanie Taylor	West Indies	439
2010	Mithali Raj (2)	India	820	Jhulan Goswami	India	776	Shelley Nitschke	Australia	506
2009	Mithali Raj	India	749	Holly Colvin	England	714	Lisa Sthalekar (3)	Australia	442
2008	Claire Taylor (2)	England	800	Isa Guha	England	717	Lisa Sthalekar (2)	Australia	497
2007	Claire Taylor	England	786	Jhulan Goswami	India	778	Lisa Sthalekar	Australia	401
2006	Karen Rolton (5)	Australia	803	Cathryn Fitzpatrick (6)	Australia	770	Cathryn Fitzpatrick (2)	Australia	572
2005	Karen Rolton (4)	Australia	843	Cathryn Fitzpatrick (5)	Australia	848	Cathryn Fitzpatrick	Australia	552
2004	Karen Rolton (3)	Australia	865	Cathryn Fitzpatrick (4)	Australia	879	Karen Rolton (5)	Australia	485
2003	Karen Rolton (2)	Australia	854	Cathryn Fitzpatrick (3)	Australia	878	Karen Rolton (4)	Australia	505
2002	Karen Rolton	Australia	849	Cathryn Fitzpatrick (2)	Australia	834	Karen Rolton (3)	Australia	421
2001	Belinda Clark (5)	Australia	843	Cathryn Fitzpatrick	Australia	790	Karen Rolton (2)	Australia	382
2000	Belinda Clark (4)	Australia	866	Katrina Keenan	New Zealand	800	Karen Rolton	Australia	387
1999	Belinda Clark (3)	Australia	852	Catherine Campbell (4)	New Zealand	759	Karen Smithies (3)	England	314
1998	Belinda Clark (2)	Australia	848	Catherine Campbell (3)	New Zealand	725	Karen Smithies (2)	England	328
1997	Belinda Clark	Australia	862	Catherine Campbell (2)	New Zealand	725	Karen Smithies	England	278
1996	Debbie Hockley (7)	New Zealand	803	Catherine Campbell	New Zealand	693	Zoe Goss (3)	Australia	407
1995	Debbie Hockley (6)	New Zealand	761	Zoe Goss (2)	Australia	636	Zoe Goss (2)	Australia	436
1994	Janette Brittin (6)	England	788	Zoe Goss	Australia	612	Zoe Goss	Australia	373
1993	Janette Brittin (5)	England	788	Karen Gunn (4)	New Zealand	726	Carole Hodges (2)	England	409
1992	Debbie Hockley (5)	New Zealand	779	Karen Brown	Australia	711	Karen Gunn (4)	New Zealand	406
1991	Debbie Hockley (4)	New Zealand	781	Karen Gunn (3)	New Zealand	683	Karen Gunn (3)	New Zealand	324
1990	Debbie Hockley (3)	New Zealand	774	Karen Gunn (2)	New Zealand	638	Karen Gunn (2)	New Zealand	260
1989	Debbie Hockley (2)	New Zealand	783	Karen Gunn	New Zealand	608	Karen Gunn	New Zealand	210
1988	Debbie Hockley	New Zealand	783	Lyn Fullston (4)	Australia	680	Carole Hodges	England	225
1987	Janette Brittin (4)	England	663	Lyn Fullston (3)	Australia	619	Lyn Fullston (2)	Australia	187
1986	Janette Brittin (3)	England	657	Lyn Fullston (2)	Australia	610	Lyn Fullston	Australia	191
1985	Janette Brittin (2)	England	651	Lyn Fullston	Australia	584	Sue Rattray	New Zealand	249
1984	Janette Brittin	England	635	Joel Garner	West Indies	918	Sharon Tredrea (4)	Australia	201
1983	Rachael Heyhoe-Flint (5)	England	621	Raelee Thompson (2)	Australia	509	Sharon Tredrea (3)	Australia	237
1982	Rachael Heyhoe-Flint (4)	England	621	Raelee Thompson	Australia	509	Sharon Tredrea (2)	Australia	237
1981	Enid Bakewell (5)	England	505	Glynis Hullah (4)	England	393	Enid Bakewell (8)	England	153
1980	Enid Bakewell (4)	England	505	Glynis Hullah (3)	England	393	Enid Bakewell (7)	England	153
1979	Enid Bakewell (3)	England	505	Glynis Hullah (2)	England	393	Enid Bakewell (6)	England	153
1978	Lynne Thomas	England	462	Glynis Hullah	England	395	Sharon Tredrea	Australia	130
1977	Enid Bakewell (2)	England	447	June Stephenson (2)	England	360	Enid Bakewell (5)	England	122
1976	Enid Bakewell	England	447	June Stephenson	England	360	Enid Bakewell (4)	England	122
1975	Rachael Heyhoe-Flint (3)	England	425	Mary Pilling (3)	England	298	Enid Bakewell (3)	England	81
1974	Rachael Heyhoe-Flint (2)	England	425	Mary Pilling (2)	England	298	Enid Bakewell (2)	England	81
1973	Rachael Heyhoe-Flint	England	425	Mary Pilling	England	298	Enid Bakewell	England	81

=== Year end top ranked players in WT20I cricket ===
Year	Top Batter	Country	Rating	Top Bowler	Country	Rating	Top All-rounder	Country	Rating
2025	Beth Mooney (4)	Australia	794	Annabel Sutherland	Australia	736	Hayley Matthews (4)	West Indies	505
2024	Beth Mooney (3)	Australia	757	Sophie Ecclestone (5)	England	768	Hayley Matthews (3)	West Indies	495
2023	Tahlia McGrath (2)	Australia	794	Sophie Ecclestone (4)	England	777	Hayley Matthews (2)	West Indies	498
2022	Tahlia McGrath	Australia	814	Sophie Ecclestone (3)	England	763	Ashleigh Gardner	Australia	417
2021	Beth Mooney (2)	Australia	754	Sophie Ecclestone (2)	England	771	Sophie Devine (2)	New Zealand	370
2020	Beth Mooney	Australia	748	Sophie Ecclestone	England	777	Sophie Devine	New Zealand	415
2019	Suzie Bates (2)	New Zealand	768	Megan Schutt (2)	Australia	773	Ellyse Perry (2)	Australia	382
2018	Suzie Bates	New Zealand	694	Megan Schutt	Australia	728	Stafanie Taylor (3)	West Indies	353
2017	Stafanie Taylor (3)	West Indies	678	Hayley Matthews	West Indies	631	Hayley Matthews	West Indies	288
2016	Stafanie Taylor (2)	West Indies	684	Morna Nielsen	New Zealand	655	Ellyse Perry	Australia	310
2015	Meg Lanning (2)	Australia	687	Anya Shrubsole	England	678	Dane van Niekerk	South Africa	277
2014	Meg Lanning	Australia	706	Salma Khatun	Bangladesh	649	Salma Khatun	Bangladesh	361
2013	Sarah Taylor (2)	England	666	Shanel Daley	West Indies	657	Stafanie Taylor (2)	West Indies	372
2012	Sarah Taylor	England	703	Lisa Sthalekar (2)	Australia	674	Lisa Sthalekar	Australia	373
2011	Charlotte Edwards (5)	England	705	Anisa Mohammed	West Indies	652	Stafanie Taylor	West Indies	346
2010	Stafanie Taylor	West Indies	714	Ellyse Perry	Australia	685	Shelley Nitschke (2)	Australia	447
2009	Charlotte Edwards (4)	England	788	Holly Colvin	England	578	Shelley Nitschke	Australia	277
2008	Charlotte Edwards (3)	England	708	Lisa Sthalekar	Australia	340	Jenny Gunn (2)	England	74
2007	Charlotte Edwards (2)	England	473	Helen Watson	New Zealand	349	Jenny Gunn	England	74
2006	Karen Rolton	Australia	484	Katherine Brunt	England	117	Karen Rolton	Australia	18
2005	Charlotte Edwards	England	272	Jenny Gunn	England	35	Charlotte Edwards	England	4
2004	Lydia Greenway	England	107	Aimee Watkins	New Zealand	22	—N/a		

== See also ==
- International cricket
- ICC Men's Player Rankings
- Women's cricket
- Women's One Day International
- Women's Twenty20 International
