= Disbury =

Disbury is a surname. Notable people with the surname include:

- Audrey Disbury (1934–2016), English cricketer
- Brian Disbury (cricketer) (1929–2016), English cricketer
- Brian Disbury (field hockey)
