= Benjamin Flint =

English cricketer

Benjamin Flint (12 January 1893 – 20 July 1959) was an English cricketer active from 1919 to 1924. He played for Nottinghamshire in thirteen first-class matches from 1920 to 1921. A right-arm fast bowler, he took 19 wickets at an average of 29.57. His son was Derrick Flint, who played a few times for Warwickshire in 1948 and 1949 and who later married Rachael Heyhoe Flint, England's successful woman cricketer of the 1960s and 1970s.
