= Jean Clark =

Jean Clark may refer to:

- Jean Clark (cricketer) (1936–1970), English cricketer
- Jean Clark (artist) (1902–1999), British artist
