= Jill Cruwys =

English cricketer

Personal information
- Full name: Jill Elizabeth Cruwys
- Born: 5 December 1943; Bromley, Kent, England
- Died: 30 December 1990 (aged 47); Droitwich, Worcestershire, England
- Role: Batter

International information
- National side: England (1969–1976)
- Test debut (cap 76): 15 February 1969 v New Zealand
- Last Test: 3 July 1976 v Australia
- ODI debut (cap 3): 23 June 1973 v International XI
- Last ODI: 8 August 1976 v Australia

Domestic team information
- Years: Team
- 1963–1968: Kent
- 1974–1976: West Midlands
- 1976: West

Career statistics
Competition	WTest	WODI	WFC	WLA
Matches	5	7	19	11
Runs scored	61	34	596	52
Batting average	10.16	34.00	33.11	13.00
100s/50s	0/0	0/0	1/3	0/0
Top score	40	34*	101	18*
Balls bowled	0	6	346	6
Wickets	–	0	2	0
Bowling average	–	–	91.00	–
5 wickets in innings	–	–	0	–
10 wickets in match	–	–	0	–
Best bowling	–	–	1/12	–
Catches/stumpings	2/–	0/–	6/–	2/–
- Source: CricketArchive, 28 February 2021

Jill Elizabeth Cruwys (5 December 1943 – 30 December 1990) was an English cricketer who played primarily as a batter. She appeared in 5 Test matches and 7 One Day Internationals for England between 1969 and 1976. Cruwys was a member of the successful England team that beat Australia at Edgbaston to win the first Women's World Cup in July 1973. She played domestic cricket primarily for Kent and West Midlands, as well as appearing in one match for West of England.

== Career ==
Cruwys played for Kent between 1963 and 1968, appearing in ten matches. In 1968, she was selected to play in the England team touring Australia and New Zealand. In their first match in Australia, they beat Western Australia 228 for 5 declared, with Cruwys on 71 not out. Cruwys topped the England team's batting averages for all three games played in Australia with 70.5. She played in the England team against New Zealand in Wellington, and also played in a one-day match in Nelson, New Zealand, where her third wicket stand of 51 with Sheila Plant (101) secured a win for England. She was also a member of the England women's team which toured the West Indies in 1971.

In 1974, she joined the West Midlands women's team, where she and Rachael Heyhoe Flint formed "the main strength" of the side playing against Australia in Wolverhampton in 1976. At the time of her selection for the England women's team in 1976, she was described as "reputedly the finest fielder England women's cricket has produced." At a charity match in 1972 between a Lord's Taverners men's team and a women's team led by Rachael Heyhoe Flint, Cruwys "won frequent applause and took two catches in the deep, of which any man would have been proud," and in the 1973 Women's Cricket World Cup, "the fielding of both teams was a joy to watch and especially for England, Jill Cruwys' throwing in from the deep, which would put many county players to shame."

== Personal life ==
Jill Cruwys was born in Bromley, Kent, the youngest child of Leslie Jackson Cruwys, a car sales executive, and Margaret Elizabeth, née Gosling. She started playing cricket aged four, using a tennis ball and chalked wicket. She attended Dartford College of Physical Education, graduating in 1965, and then worked as a physical education teacher at West Wickham, Kent and Droitwich High School, Worcestershire. She also played hockey for Kent from 1966 to 1969, and for Worcestershire from 1969 to 1970. Her hobbies were music, badminton and woodwork. She died of breast cancer in 1990, aged 47.

== Awards ==
In 2020, she was awarded Kent Women Cap no. 13.
