= Brian Disbury =

Brian Disbury may refer to:

- Brian Disbury (cricketer) (1929–2016), English cricketer
- Brian Disbury (field hockey) (born c. 1951), British hockey international
