= Enid Bakewell =

English cricketer

Enid Bakewell MBE
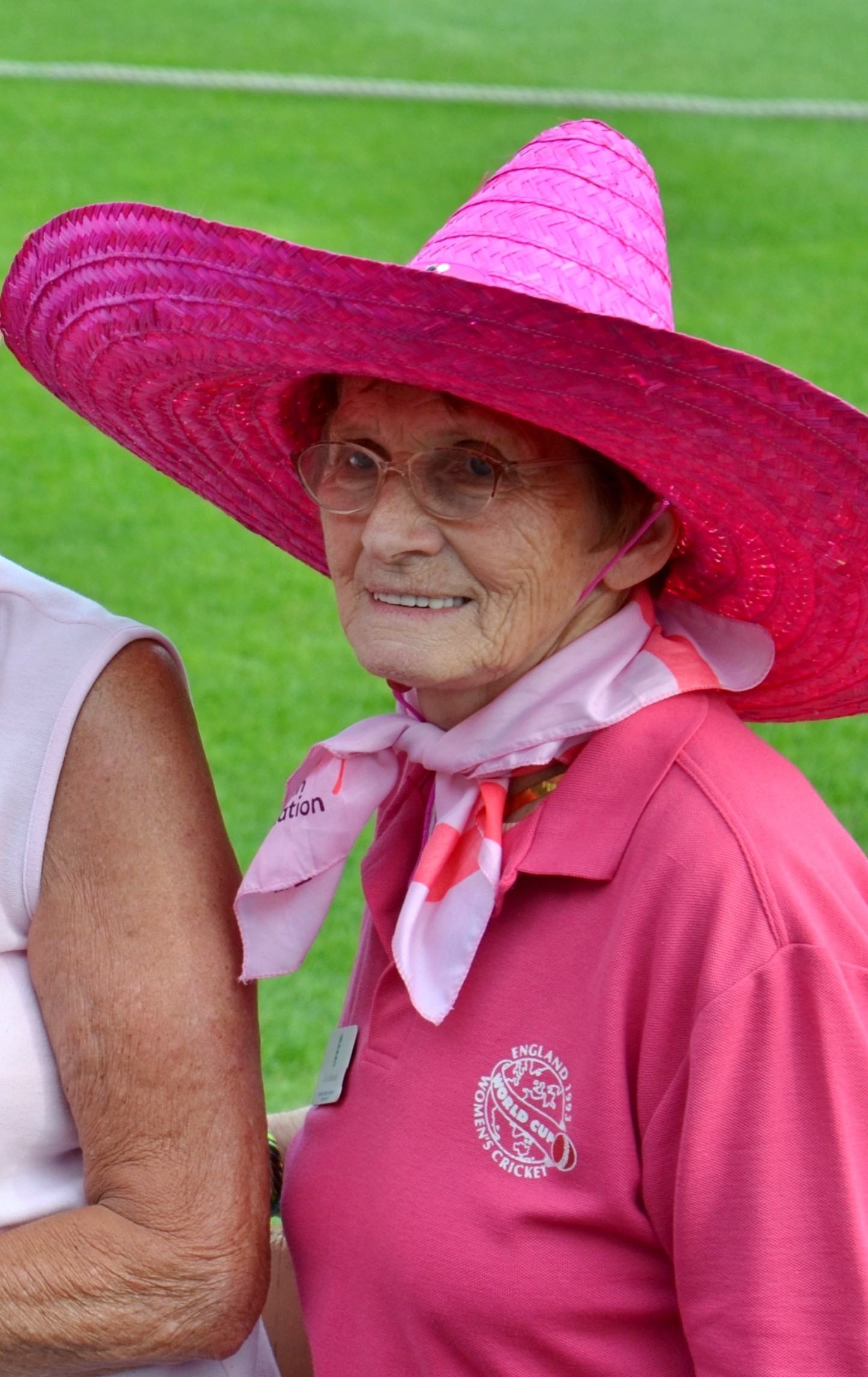
- Bakewell in 2017

Personal information
- Full name: Enid Bakewell
- Born: 16 December 1940 (age 85); Newstead Village, Nottinghamshire, England
- Batting: Right-handed
- Bowling: Slow left-arm orthodox
- Role: All-rounder

International information
- National side: England (1968–1982)
- Test debut (cap 70): 27 December 1968 v Australia
- Last Test: 1 July 1979 v West Indies
- ODI debut (cap 1): 23 June 1973 v International XI
- Last ODI: 7 February 1982 v Australia

Domestic team information
- Years: Team
- 1963–1993: East Midlands
- 1994–1999: Surrey

Career statistics
Competition	WTest	WODI	WFC	WLA
Matches	12	23	39	96
Runs scored	1,078	500	2,281	2,457
Batting average	59.88	35.71	42.24	36.67
100s/50s	4/7	2/2	5/16	4/10
Top score	124	118	124	118
Balls bowled	2,698	1,313	6,939	5,139
Wickets	50	25	157	130
Bowling average	16.62	21.12	14.38	15.59
5 wickets in innings	3	0	12	2
10 wickets in match	1	0	4	0
Best bowling	7/61	3/13	8/16	5/20
Catches/stumpings	9/–	7/–	23/–	28/–
- Source: CricketArchive, 3 March 2021

Enid Bakewell MBE

Councillor for Ashfield District Council
- In office 7 May 1987 – 4 May 1995
- Ward: Woodhouse

Personal details
- Born: 16 December 1940 (age 85) Newstead Village, Nottinghamshire, England
- Party: Labour
- Parents: Thomas Turton (father); Mabel Amos (mother)

Enid Bakewell MBE (née Turton; born 16 December 1940) played for the English women's cricket team in 12 Tests between 1968 and 1979, and in 23 one-day international matches. A right-handed batter and slow left-arm orthodox bowler, on her figures she has a strong claim to be regarded as the best all-rounder that the English women's game has produced. In Tests she scored 1,078 runs at an average of 59.88, with 4 centuries, as well as taking 50 wickets at an average of 16.62. In what proved to be her final Test, she scored 68 and 112* (out of an England total of 164) and took 10 for 75 (including career-best figures in the second innings of 7-61) against West Indies at Edgbaston in 1979. Her final WODI appearance was in the final of the 1982 Women's Cricket World Cup.

She, along with Lynne Thomas, set the record for the highest opening run partnership in the history of Women's Cricket World Cup (246).

In 2014 Wisden Cricketers' Almanack selected her as one of the five greatest female players of all time.

== Early life ==
Bakewell was born in Newstead Village, Nottinghamshire to Thomas Leonard Turton and Mabel Alice 'May' Turton (née Amos). She was encouraged to play cricket from an early age. She was educated at the primary school in Newstead and at Brincliffe County Grammar School, Nottingham. After playing for a local club, Notts Casuals WCC, she started to play for the Nottinghamshire county women's team aged 14. She initially concentrated on her batting but was encouraged to develop her slow left-arm bowling, which she modelled on Tony Lock.

She studied at Dartford College of Physical Education, graduating in 1959. She married Colin Bakewell, an electrical engineer with Rolls-Royce. Their daughter was born in 1966, and they subsequently had two further children.

== Cricket career ==
Bakewell was considered for selection for the Test tour to Australia in 1963. She was pregnant and so missed the home Tests against New Zealand in England in 1966. She joined the 1968–69 tour, playing in all three Tests against Australia and all three Tests against New Zealand. She opened the batting in her first Test, against Australia in 1968, and made a century on debut (an innings named by Wisden Cricket Monthly as one of the 'centuries that changed cricket'). She also scored centuries opening the batting in the first and second Tests against New Zealand in 1969.

Small but quick and athletic, with good footwork, on the tour she achieved a batting average of 39.60 in 29 innings, and took 118 wickets at a bowling average of 9.70.

In the first ever Women's World Cup competition in 1973, which England won, she scored 118 in the final match against Australia and took 2/28 in 12 overs. She also played, at age 41, in the 1982 Women's Cricket World Cup, taking 3 for 13 against India at Wanganui and then three for 29 against the International XI at Wellington.

She also played in the three Tests at home against Australia in 1973, and the three home Tests against the West Indies in 1979. At Edgbaston in 1979 she scored 68 in the first innings, carried her bat to score 112 not out in the second innings, and took 10 for 75 in the match (3-14 and 7-61).

== International centuries ==
Test centuries
No.	Runs	Opponents	City/Country	Venue	Year
1	101 not out	Australia	Adelaide, Australia	Barton Oval	1968
2	124	New Zealand	Wellington, New Zealand	Basin Reserve	1969
3	114	New Zealand	Christchurch, New Zealand	Hagley Oval	1969
4	112 not out	West Indies	Birmingham, England	Edgbaston	1979

One-Day International centuries
No.	Runs	Opponents	City/Country	Venue	Year
1	101 not out	International XI	Hove, England	County Ground	1973
2	118	Australia	Birmingham, England	Edgbaston	1973

== Later life ==
She continued to play for East Midlands and later Surrey into her 50s. She is an ECB-qualified coach. Bakewell has continued to play cricket into her 80s, playing for Caythorpe CC Women's Team in 2021 and in 2022 she toured Australia with the East Anglian Veteran Ladies team, playing matches against veteran men's and women's sides.

Bakewell was inducted into the ICC Cricket Hall of Fame in 2012, becoming the third woman cricketer to be thus recognized (after Rachel Heyhoe-Flint and Belinda Clark).

She was awarded the MBE in the 2019 New Year Honours.
