= Derrick Flint =

English cricketer (1924–2018)

Personal information
- Born: 14 June 1924; Creswell, Derbyshire, England
- Died: 22 July 2018 (aged 94)
- Batting: Right-handed
- Bowling: Right-arm leg-break and googly

Domestic team information
- Years: Team
- 1948–1949: Warwickshire
- FC debut: 26 June 1948 Warwickshire v Cambridge University
- Last FC: 11 June 1949 Warwickshire v Essex

Career statistics
Competition	First-class
Matches	10
Runs scored	33
Batting average	4.71
100s/50s	0/0
Top score	11
Balls bowled	1,110
Wickets	12
Bowling average	38.75
5 wickets in innings	0
10 wickets in match	0
Best bowling	4/67
Catches/stumpings	5/–
- Source: Cricinfo, 26 March 2020

Derrick Flint (14 June 1924 – 22 July 2018) was an English cricketer who played first-class cricket in 10 matches for Warwickshire County Cricket Club in 1948 and 1949. He was born in Creswell, Derbyshire.

Flint played as an amateur right-arm leg-break and googly bowler in a team that also included, when he was not on Test cricket duty, the professional Eric Hollies. As a result, Flint's opportunities to play regularly for the first XI were limited. He took 12 wickets in his 10 first-class matches, 10 coming in two matches against Cambridge University and a match against Scotland. In seven County Championship games he took just two wickets. He was not successful with the bat. In 1950 and 1951 he played for Derbyshire's second eleven, but he did not play any further first-class games.

Flint's father, Benjamin Flint, played first-class cricket for Nottinghamshire in a dozen matches in the seasons after the First World War. Derrick Flint married the England women's Test cricket captain and national field hockey player Rachael Heyhoe who thereafter took the name Rachael Heyhoe Flint, later Baroness Heyhoe Flint.
