= List of England women ODI cricketers =

Since England women's first Women's One Day International (ODI) in 1973, 151 players have represented the team. A One Day International (ODI) is an international cricket match between two representative teams, each having ODI status, as determined by the International Cricket Council (ICC). An ODI differs from Test matches in that the number of overs per team is limited, and that each team has only one innings. The list is arranged in the order in which each player won her first ODI cap. Where more than one player won her first ODI cap in the same match, those players are listed alphabetically by surname.

== Key ==
General

- ‡ – Captain
- † – Wicket-keeper
- First – Year of debut
- Last – Year of latest game
- Mat – Number of matches played

Batting

- Runs – Runs scored in career
- HS – Highest score
- Avg – Runs scored per dismissal
- * – Batsman remained not out

Bowling

- Balls – Balls bowled in career
- Wkt – Wickets taken in career
- BBI – Best bowling in an innings
- Ave – Average runs per wicket

Fielding

- Ca – Catches taken
- St – Stumpings taken

== Players ==
Statistics are correct as of 6 September 2026.

Cap	Name	First	Last	Mat	Batting					Bowling					Fielding		Ref(s)
Cap	Name	First	Last	Mat	Runs	HS	Avg	50	100	Balls	Wkt	BBI	Ave	5WI	Ca	St	Ref(s)
1	Enid Bakewell	1973	1982	23	500	118	35.71	2	2	1,313	25	3/13	21.12	0	7	0	
2	Lesley Clifford	1973	1973	5	13	8*	–	0	0	198	3	3/19	22.33	0	1	0	
3	Jill Cruwys	1973	1976	7	38	18*	38.00	0	0	6	0	–	–	0	0	0	
4	Rachael Heyhoe Flint ‡	1973	1982	23	643	114	58.45	4	1	18	1	1/13	20.00	0	6	0	
5	Sue Hilliam	1973	1973	4	1	1*	–	0	0	173	6	3/6	12.66	0	1	0	
6	Shirley Hodges †	1973	1982	26	34	26*	–	0	0	0	–	–	–	–	20	15	
7	Pamela Mather	1973	1973	5	–	–	–	0	0	264	2	2/32	50.00	0	0	0	
8	Mary Pilling ‡	1973	1978	9	11	8	5.50	0	0	456	10	2/6	14.00	0	5	0	
9	June Stephenson	1973	1976	9	60	37	15.00	0	0	430	10	3/4	16.90	0	5	0	
10	Lynne Thomas	1973	1979	12	438	134	54.75	1	1	318	6	2/15	27.66	0	1	0	(Note: Lynne Thomas also played One Day International cricket for International XI. Only her record for England is given above.)
11	Chris Watmough	1973	1985	28	593	54*	29.65	4	0	132	5	3/28	14.00	0	3	0	
12	Kay Green	1973	1973	2	1	1*	–	0	0	36	1	1/21	21.00	0	1	0	
13	Heather Dewdney	1973	1978	6	28	20*	9.33	0	0	0	–	–	–	–	0	0	
14	Jane Gough	1973	1973	1	33	33	33.00	0	0	0	–	–	–	–	0	0	
15	Katherine Brown	1976	1979	2	–	–	–	–	–	108	2	2/29	36.50	0	0	0	(Note: Katherine Brown also played One Day International cricket for Young England. Only her record for England is given above.)
16	Jacqueline Court	1976	1987	23	347	67	26.69	1	0	700	15	4/29	22.20	0	10	0	(Note: Jacqueline Court also played One Day International cricket for Young England. Only her record for England is given above.)
17	Julia Greenwood	1976	1979	3	–	–	–	–	–	144	4	3/36	24.75	0	0	0	(Note: Julia Greenwood also played One Day International cricket for Young England. Only her record for England is given above.)
18	Megan Lear	1976	1982	16	370	58	33.63	3	0	12	1	1/0	0.00	0	3	0	(Note: Megan Lear also played One Day International cricket for Young England. Only her record for England is given above.)
19	Lynne Read †	1976	1976	1	–	–	–	–	–	0	–	–	–	–	0	0	(Note: Lynne Read also played One Day International cricket for Young England. Only her record for England is given above.)
20	Jan Southgate ‡	1976	1985	17	372	82	28.61	3	0	138	4	2/28	23.00	0	4	0	
21	Glynis Hullah	1976	1982	15	52	18*	13.00	0	0	885	15	2/2	22.46	0	4	0	(Note: Glynis Hullah also played One Day International cricket for Young England. Only her record for England is given above.)
22	Rosalind Heggs	1978	1978	3	1	1	1.00	0	0	123	4	3/37	17.00	0	1	0	(Note: Rosalind Heggs also played One Day International cricket for Young England. Only her record for England is given above.)
23	Catherine Mowat	1978	1978	3	–	–	–	–	–	84	1	1/2	28.00	0	1	0	
24	Margaret Wilks	1978	1978	3	0	0	0.00	0	0	102	3	2/6	14.66	0	0	0	(Note: Margaret Wilks also played One Day International cricket for Young England. Only her record for England is given above.)
25	Jan Brittin	1979	1998	63	2,121	138*	42.42	8	5	296	8	3/16	23.75	0	26	0	
26	Susan Goatman ‡	1979	1982	15	444	83	34.15	3	0	0	–	–	–	–	5	0	
27	Margaret Peear	1979	1979	1	–	–	–	–	–	0	–	–	–	–	0	0	
28	Jacqueline Wainwright	1979	1979	2	2	2*	–	0	0	84	0	–	–	0	0	0	
29	Jill Powell	1979	1979	1	2	2	2.00	0	0	0	–	–	–	–	0	0	
30	Janet Tedstone	1979	1992	38	146	23*	18.25	0	0	2,227	46	4/17	22.41	0	5	0	
31	Avril Starling	1982	1986	20	5	3*	2.50	0	0	1,242	25	3/7	18.16	0	2	0	
32	Carole Hodges ‡	1982	1993	47	1,073	113	32.51	3	2	2,207	58	4/3	15.06	0	22	0	
33	Helen Stother	1982	1986	38	12	7	2.20	0	0	747	5	1/14	72.80	0	2	0	
34	June Edney †	1984	1985	6	65	35	13.00	0	0	0	–	–	–	–	4	1	
35	Gillian McConway	1984	1987	11	20	11*	6.66	0	0	668	11	3/12	26.63	0	2	0	(Note: Gillian McConway also played One Day International cricket for International XI. Only her record for England is given above.)
36	Sarah Potter	1984	1987	8	58	30	9.66	0	0	408	10	3/11	23.50	0	1	0	
37	Jane Powell ‡	1984	1990	24	463	98*	33.07	2	0	0	–	–	–	–	7	0	
38	Jill Stockdale	1985	1985	2	15	13	7.50	0	0	54	0	–	–	0	0	0	
39	Susan Metcalfe	1985	1998	36	534	51*	24.27	1	0	36	0	–	–	0	8	0	
40	Lesley Cooke	1986	1986	3	49	24	16.33	0	0	0	–	–	–	–	0	0	
41	Gillian Smith	1986	1993	31	13	6*	6.50	0	0	1,521	41	5/15	12.53	2	10	0	
42	Amanda Stinson †	1986	1987	5	1	1*	–	–	–	0	–	–	–	–	3	1	
43	Karen Smithies ‡	1986	2000	69	921	110*	23.61	1	1	2,681	64	3/6	18.65	0	21	0	
44	Jo Chamberlain	1987	1995	39	422	47*	20.09	0	0	1,928	49	7/8	16.42	2	17	0	
45	Karen Jobling	1987	1987	2	–	–	–	–	–	60	1	1/36	51.00	0	0	0	(Note: Karen Jobling also played One Day International cricket for International XI. Only her record for England is given above.)
46	Wendy Watson	1987	1993	23	768	107*	48.00	5	1	0	–	–	–	–	3	0	
47	Patsy Lovell †	1987	1988	10	41	12	6.83	0	0	444	8	3/15	25.00	0	3	0	
48	Elaine Wulcko	1987	1987	1	–	–	–	–	–	12	0	–	–	0	0	0	
49	Suzie Kitson	1988	1992	23	100	29	9.54	0	0	807	19	3/13	17.68	0	11	0	
50	Debra Maybury	1988	1995	27	275	56	17.18	1	0	408	13	2/7	12.46	0	5	0	
51	Lisa Nye †	1988	1992	21	31	13*	31.00	0	0	0	–	–	–	–	10	9	
52	Caroline Barrs	1988	1990	10	104	36	13.00	0	0	503	17	4/23	9.52	0	2	0	
53	Clare Taylor	1988	2005	105	303	29	8.65	0	0	5,140	102	4/13	23.95	0	28	0	
54	Cathy Cooke	1989	1990	6	10	10*	10.00	0	0	138	2	1/15	33.50	0	3	0	
55	Helen Plimmer ‡	1989	1997	37	886	118	25.31	5	1	0	–	–	–	–	11	0	
56	Julie Crump	1989	1989	2	–	–	–	–	–	102	2	1/12	16.50	0	0	0	
57	Alison Elder †	1990	1990	4	43	37*	–	0	0	0	–	–	–	–	6	0	
58	Linda Burnley	1990	1990	1	30	30	30.00	0	0	0	–	–	–	–	1	0	
59	Sarah-Jane Cook	1990	1996	4	–	–	–	–	–	144	0	–	–	0	1	0	
60	Janet Godman	1991	1993	7	58	17	9.66	0	0	0	–	–	–	–	4	0	
61	Marie Moralee	1991	1991	3	25	24*	–	0	0	42	3	3/6	2.00	0	2	0	
62	Debra Stock	1992	1996	15	153	46	19.12	0	0	724	13	2/2	27.46	0	2	0	
63	Barbara Daniels	1993	2000	55	1,309	142*	27.27	7	1	0	–	–	–	–	16	0	
64	Jane Smit †	1993	2007	109	1,009	91	17.91	4	0	0	–	–	–	–	69	45	
65	Kathryn Leng	1995	2003	56	711	80	15.80	1	0	1,461	33	4/31	29.57	0	14	0	
66	Sue Redfern	1995	1999	15	31	27	15.50	0	0	615	16	4/21	18.18	0	3	0	
67	Melissa Reynard	1995	2002	54	384	46*	13.24	0	0	1,923	46	4/6	29.08	0	3	0	
68	Claire Whichcord	1995	1995	1	–	–	–	–	–	42	0	–	–	0	0	0	
69	Clare Connor ‡	1995	2005	93	1,087	85*	16.46	5	0	3,580	80	5/49	26.01	1	25	0	
70	Ruth Lupton	1995	1995	2	21	19	21.00	0	0	0	–	–	–	–	0	0	
71	Nicola Holt	1996	1996	2	3	2	1.50	0	0	60	0	–	–	0	0	0	
72	Bev Nicholson	1996	1999	6	53	34	17.66	0	0	72	0	–	–	0	1	0	
73	Charlotte Edwards ‡	1997	2016	191	5,992	173*	38.16	46	9	1,627	54	4/30	21.74	0	52	0	
74	Laura Newton	1997	2007	73	1,324	79	20.68	9	0	1,369	19	2/17	51.21	0	27	0	
75	Sarah Collyer	1998	2003	25	277	39	16.29	0	0	1,187	24	5/32	29.33	1	5	0	
76	Lucy Pearson	1998	2005	63	71	22*	3.08	0	0	3,026	68	3/14	22.97	0	10	0	
77	Katharine Winks	1998	2000	7	24	15	12.00	0	0	222	2	1/15	60.00	0	1	0	
78	Claire Taylor †	1998	2011	126	4,101	156*	40.20	23	8	0	–	–	–	–	41	5	
79	Ella Donnison ‡†	1999	1999	3	34	19	11.33	0	0	0	–	–	–	–	3	2	
80	Laura Harper	1999	2005	25	197	41	15.15	0	0	1,087	33	5/12	16.30	1	5	0	
81	Jackie Hawker	1999	2002	7	32	16	5.33	0	0	24	0	–	–	0	1	0	
82	Dawn Holden	1999	2004	32	154	26	8.55	0	0	1,291	25	3/29	31.04	0	6	0	
83	Hannah Lloyd	1999	2003	5	23	14	5.75	0	0	0	–	–	–	–	3	0	
84	Kate Lowe	1999	2002	8	105	57*	17.50	1	0	0	–	–	–	–	2	0	
85	Beth Morgan	1999	2011	72	590	77	13.40	1	0	1,360	27	3/19	35.55	0	26	0	
86	Nicky Shaw ‡	1999	2010	70	353	35	9.54	0	0	2,394	46	4/34	29.41	0	15	0	
87	Kath Wilkins	1999	1999	3	66	27	22.00	0	0	115	4	2/4	7.75	0	0	0	
88	Arran Brindle ‡	1999	2014	85	1,928	107*	27.94	11	1	1,032	35	3/0	22.17	0	40	0	
89	Laura Spragg	1999	2004	13	114	33	11.40	0	0	354	10	3/8	18.70	0	0	0	
90	Leanne Davis	2000	2001	2	–	–	–	–	–	42	1	1/12	20.00	0	0	0	
91	Caroline Atkins	2001	2010	58	1,291	145	30.02	6	1	6	0	–	–	0	14	0	
92	Sarah Clarke	2001	2002	6	68	66*	22.66	1	0	119	5	4/15	16.80	0	0	0	
93	Clare Gough	2001	2001	3	1	1	1.00	0	0	18	0	–	–	0	1	0	
94	Isa Guha	2001	2011	83	122	26	8.71	0	0	3,767	101	5/14	23.21	2	26	0	
95	Laura Joyce †	2001	2001	3	27	27	13.50	0	0	–	–	–	–	–	1	0	
96	Kate Oakenfold	2001	2001	3	12	6	4.00	0	0	60	0	–	–	0	2	0	
97	Alexia Walker	2001	2001	3	14	7*	14.00	0	0	54	1	1/0	29.00	0	1	0	
98	Ebony Rainford-Brent	2001	2010	22	377	72	23.56	2	0	96	2	1/8	45.00	0	4	0	
99	Mandie Godliman †	2002	2003	11	50	14	7.14	0	0	0	–	–	–	–	6	2	
100	Helen Wardlaw	2002	2004	7	39	29	9.75	0	0	252	7	2/27	26.42	0	3	0	
101	Rosalie Birch	2003	2008	37	301	46*	15.05	0	0	1,342	46	5/50	18.04	1	7	0	
102	Lydia Greenway	2003	2016	126	2,554	125*	30.04	12	1	0	–	–	–	–	52	0	
103	Jenny Gunn	2004	2019	144	1,629	73	19.62	5	0	5,906	136	5/22	28.10	2	49	0	
104	Katherine Sciver-Brunt	2005	2022	141	1,090	72*	18.16	2	0	6,847	170	5/18	24.00	5	39	0	
105	Jo Watts	2005	2005	7	1	1	0.50	0	0	297	6	2/3	35.00	0	1	0	
106	Holly Colvin	2006	2013	72	180	29	13.84	0	0	3,577	98	4/17	21.80	0	21	0	
107	Sarah Taylor †	2006	2019	126	4,056	147	38.26	20	7	0	–	–	–	–	87	51	
108	Laura Marsh	2006	2019	103	682	67	13.91	1	0	5,328	129	5/15	26.84	1	25	0	
109	Lynsey Askew	2007	2008	8	120	68	24.00	1	0	336	6	2/19	46.16	0	0	0	
110	Charlie Russell	2007	2007	2	4	4	4.00	0	0	54	1	1/45	45.00	0	1	0	
111	Steph Davies	2008	2008	4	2	2	2.00	0	0	180	6	4/47	24.50	0	0	0	
112	Anya Shrubsole	2008	2022	86	285	32*	10.55	0	0	4,002	106	6/46	26.53	2	23	0	
113	Tammy Beaumont †	2009	2025	140	4,738	168*	40.49	24	12	0	–	–	–	–	37	4	
114	Danielle Hazell ‡	2009	2018	53	361	45	17.19	0	0	2,613	59	4/32	28.96	0	10	0	
115	Heather Knight ‡	2010	2026	160	4,372	109	35.54	27	3	1,923	56	5/26	24.91	1	51	0	
116	Danni Wyatt-Hodge	2010	2025	120	2,074	129	23.56	5	2	918	27	3/7	28.51	0	29	0	
117	Lauren Griffiths †	2010	2011	5	11	7	11.00	0	0	0	–	–	–	–	4	1	
118	Fran Wilson	2010	2021	33	468	85*	22.28	2	0	0	–	–	–	–	14	0	
119	Susie Rowe	2011	2011	1	–	–	–	–	–	0	–	–	–	–	0	0	
120	Georgia Elwiss	2011	2019	36	388	77	20.42	2	0	1,097	26	3/17	26.11	0	11	0	
121	Amy Jones ‡†	2013	2026	111	2,689	129	32.39	16	2	0	–	–	–	–	93	23	
122	Nat Sciver-Brunt ‡	2013	2025	129	4,354	148*	46.31	26	10	3,620	88	4/59	31.07	0	53	0	
123	Lauren Winfield-Hill	2013	2022	55	1,186	123	23.25	3	1	0	–	–	–	–	19	0	
124	Kate Cross ‡	2013	2025	76	271	38*	12.31	0	0	3,380	101	6/30	24.83	3	18	0	
125	Natasha Farrant	2013	2022	6	42	22	14.00	0	0	253	5	2/31	38.00	0	1	0	
126	Rebecca Grundy	2015	2016	7	3	1*	3.00	0	0	408	9	3/36	31.22	0	0	0	
127	Alex Hartley	2016	2019	28	10	3*	–	0	0	1,390	39	4/24	24.35	0	4	0	
128	Sophie Ecclestone	2016	2026	84	426	33*	10.65	0	0	4,399	141	6/36	19.37	2	23	0	
129	Beth Langston	2016	2016	4	21	21	21.00	0	0	186	2	1/23	47.00	0	2	0	
130	Alice Davidson-Richards	2018	2025	10	169	53	33.80	2	0	156	7	3/35	21.42	0	5	0	
131	Katie George	2018	2018	2	9	9	9.00	0	0	75	4	3/36	17.50	0	1	0	
132	Bryony Smith	2019	2019	1	–	–	–	–	–	48	1	1/20	20.00	0	0	0	
133	Sarah Glenn	2019	2025	19	68	22*	17.00	0	0	757	23	4/18	23.78	0	4	0	
134	Freya Davies	2019	2022	9	13	10*	4.33	0	0	423	10	2/36	31.10	0	4	0	
135	Sophia Dunkley	2021	2026	51	1261	119	28.65	7	2	17	1	1/1	13.00	0	12	0	
136	Charlie Dean ‡	2021	2026	59	560	47*	23.33	0	0	2,706	89	5/31	23.68	1	24	0	
137	Emma Lamb	2022	2026	29	618	102	25.75	4	1	126	3	3/42	38.66	0	3	0	
138	Lauren Bell	2022	2026	34	58	12	8.28	0	0	1,557	49	5/37	28.79	1	12	0	
139	Issy Wong	2022	2026	6	15	15	15.00	0	0	234	11	5/33	19.18	1	2	0	
140	Alice Capsey †	2022	2026	39	566	50	21.76	1	0	514	17	3/22	24.47	0	12	2	
141	Freya Kemp	2022	2026	11	249	65	27.66	1	0	138	6	2/7	22.50	0	2	0	
142	Maia Bouchier	2023	2026	23	729	104	42.88	3	2	0	–	–	–	–	6	0	
143	Lauren Filer	2023	2026	23	24	8*	3.42	0	0	979	33	3/10	25.27	0	3	0	
144	Mahika Gaur	2023	2023	2	–	–	–	–	–	74	4	3/26	13.75	0	0	0	
145	Bess Heath †	2023	2024	4	59	33*	19.66	0	0	0	–	–	–	–	3	1	
146	Hollie Armitage	2024	2024	3	78	44	26.00	0	0	0	–	–	–	–	1	0	
147	Hannah Baker	2024	2024	2	3	3*	–	0	0	78	1	1/53	77.00	0	0	0	
148	Ryana MacDonald-Gay	2024	2026	4	24	17	12.00	0	0	108	2	1/30	54.00	0	3	0	
149	Paige Scholfield	2024	2024	3	59	31	19.66	0	0	0	–	–	–	–	0	0	
150	Mady Villiers	2024	2026	6	35	14	8.75	0	0	228	9	3/30	19.88	0	1	0	
151	Georgia Davis	2024	2024	1	–	–	–	–	–	23	2	2/19	9.50	0	0	0	
152	Emily Arlott	2025	2025	4	25	18	25.00	0	0	118	6	2/15	14.66	0	0	0	
153	Linsey Smith	2025	2025	12	53	27	26.50	0	0	580	22	5/36	19.09	1	3	0	
154	Tilly Corteen-Coleman	2026	2026	5	4	3*	–	0	0	210	6	2/32	28.00	0	1	0	
155	Dani Gibson	2026	2026	6	99	41	33.00	0	0	150	2	1/21	61.50	0	2	0	
156	Jodi Grewcock	2026	2026	5	81	35	16.20	0	0	36	1	1/26	26.00	0	2	0	
