= Louise Clough =

New Zealand cricketer

Personal information
- Full name: Aletha Louise Clough
- Born: 24 July 1937 (age 89); Waitangi, Chatham Islands, New Zealand
- Batting: Right-handed
- Bowling: Right-arm medium
- Role: All-rounder

International information
- National side: New Zealand (1969)
- Only Test (cap 54): 15 February 1969 v England

Domestic team information
- Years: Team
- 1955/56–1958/59: Otago
- 1959/60: Auckland
- 1960/61–1973/74: Otago

Career statistics
Competition	WTest	WFC
Matches	1	67
Runs scored	0	1,453
Batting average	0.00	14.10
100s/50s	0/0	0/4
Top score	0	72
Balls bowled	132	8,050
Wickets	1	184
Bowling average	70.00	15.01
5 wickets in innings	0	9
10 wickets in match	0	0
Best bowling	1/70	8/30
Catches/stumpings	0/–	41/4
- Source: CricketArchive, 21 November 2021

Aletha Louise Clough (born 24 June 1937) is a New Zealand former cricketer who played as an all-rounder, bowling right-arm medium and batting right-handed, as well as playing as a wicket-keeper in four matches. She appeared in one Test match for New Zealand in 1969. She primarily played domestic cricket for Otago, as well as playing one season for Auckland.

Her one Test match came against England at Basin Reserve, which was drawn. Clough bowled 22 overs, taking 1 wicket for 70 runs, dismissing Audrey Disbury caught.
