= Clare Gough =

English cricketer (born 1982)

Personal information
- Full name: Clare Elizabeth Gough
- Born: 7 September 1982 (age 44); Wolverhampton, England
- Batting: Right-handed
- Bowling: Right-arm fast-medium
- Role: Bowler

International information
- National side: England (2001)
- ODI debut (cap 93): 10 August 2001 v Scotland
- Last ODI: 12 August 2001 v Ireland

Domestic team information
- Years: Team
- 1999: West Midlands
- 2000–2006: Staffordshire

Career statistics
Competition	WODI	WLA
Matches	3	28
Runs scored	1	100
Batting average	1.00	8.33
100s/50s	0/0	0/0
Top score	1	34
Balls bowled	18	538
Wickets	0	11
Bowling average	–	26.72
5 wickets in innings	0	0
10 wickets in match	–	–
Best bowling	–	3/9
Catches/stumpings	1/–	8/–
- Source: CricketArchive, 7 March 2021

Clare Elizabeth Gough (born 7 September 1982) is an English former cricketer who played as a right-arm bowler and right-handed batter. She appeared in three One Day Internationals for England in August 2001, making her debut against Scotland. She played domestic cricket for West Midlands and Staffordshire.
