= Dawn Newman =

Australian cricketer (born 1942)

Personal information
- Born: 8 April 1942 (age 84)
- Batting: Right-handed

International information
- National side: Australia
- Test debut (cap 63): 27 December 1968 v England
- Last Test: 25 January 1969 v England

Career statistics
Competition	Tests
Matches	3
Runs scored	154
Batting average	30.80
100s/50s	0/2
Top score	76
Balls bowled	-
Wickets	-
Bowling average	-
5 wickets in innings	-
10 wickets in match	-
Best bowling
Catches/stumpings	1/-
- Source: CricInfo, 20 April 2015

Dawn Newman (born 8 April 1942 in Mount Hawthorn, Western Australia) is an Australian former cricket player. Newman played three Tests for the Australia women's national cricket team.
