= Carol Evans =

Welsh/English cricketer

Personal information
- Full name: Carol Anne Evans
- Born: 29 November 1938; Cardiff, Wales
- Died: 14 October 2007 (aged 68)
- Role: Bowler

International information
- National side: England (1968–1969)
- Test debut (cap 72): 27 December 1968 v Australia
- Last Test: 28 March 1969 v New Zealand

Domestic team information
- Years: Team
- 1963: West Midlands
- 1966–1982: West

Career statistics
| Competition | WTest | WFC |
|---|---|---|
| Matches | 3 | 19 |
| Runs scored | 3 | 29 |
| Batting average | 3.00 | 4.14 |
| 100s/50s | 0/0 | 0/0 |
| Top score | 3 | 15 |
| Balls bowled | 498 | 2,316 |
| Wickets | 10 | 46 |
| Bowling average | 15.00 | 14.69 |
| 5 wickets in innings | 0 | 1 |
| 10 wickets in match | 0 | 1 |
| Best bowling | 4/45 | 7/25 |
| Catches/stumpings | 0/– | 8/– |
- Source: CricketArchive, 2 March 2021

Carol Anne Evans, (first name may also be spelt Carole; 29 November 1938 – 14 October 2007) was a Welsh former cricketer who played primarily as a pace bowler. She appeared in 3 Test matches for England between 1968 and 1969. She mainly played domestic cricket for West of England, as well as one match for West Midlands.
