= Lesley Clifford =

English cricketer

Personal information
- Full name: Lesley Jill Clifford
- Born: 19 January 1937; Leeds, Yorkshire, England
- Died: 12 May 1979 (aged 42); Johannesburg, South Africa
- Bowling: Slow left-arm orthodox
- Role: Bowler

International information
- National side: England (1966–1973)
- Test debut (cap 65): 18 June 1966 v New Zealand
- Last Test: 28 March 1969 v New Zealand
- ODI debut (cap 2): 23 June 1973 v International XI
- Last ODI: 28 July 1973 v Australia

Domestic team information
- Years: Team
- 1965–1973: Yorkshire
- 1971/72–1972/73: Southern Transvaal

Career statistics
Competition	WTest	WODI	WFC	WLA
Matches	9	5	23	7
Runs scored	183	13	409	130
Batting average	30.50	–	27.26	65.00
100s/50s	0/0	0/0	0/0	0/2
Top score	42	8*	48*	66
Balls bowled	1,486	198	3,065	330
Wickets	14	3	40	5
Bowling average	35.07	22.33	22.32	30.60
5 wickets in innings	1	0	1	0
10 wickets in match	0	–	0	–
Best bowling	5/51	3/19	5/51	3/19
Catches/stumpings	4/–	1/–	15/–	1/–
- Source: CricketArchive, 5 March 2021

Lesley Jill Clifford (19 January 1937 – 12 May 1979) was an English cricketer who played primarily as a slow left-arm orthodox bowler. She appeared in 9 Test matches and 5 One Day Internationals for England between 1966 and 1973. She played domestic cricket for Yorkshire and Southern Transvaal.
