= Wendy Coe =

New Zealand cricketer (born 1942)

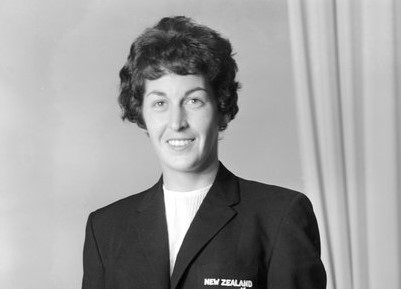
- Coe in 1966

Personal information
- Full name: Wendy Joy Coe
- Born: 17 February 1942 (age 84); Lower Hutt, New Zealand
- Batting: Right-handed
- Bowling: Right-arm medium
- Role: All-rounder

International information
- National side: New Zealand (1966–1969)
- Test debut (cap 53): 9 July 1966 v England
- Last Test: 28 March 1969 v England

Domestic team information
- Years: Team
- 1960/61–1968/69: Wellington

Career statistics
Competition	WTest	WFC
Matches	3	36
Runs scored	83	1,059
Batting average	20.75	24.06
100s/50s	0/0	2/2
Top score	34	118*
Balls bowled	560	4,952
Wickets	6	88
Bowling average	37.00	17.28
5 wickets in innings	0	2
10 wickets in match	0	0
Best bowling	2/30	5/30
Catches/stumpings	0/–	28/–
- Source: CricketArchive, 22 November 2021

Wendy Joy Coe (née Devereux; born 17 February 1942) is a New Zealand former cricketer who played as a right-handed batter and right-arm medium bowler. She appeared in three Test matches for New Zealand between 1966 and 1969. She played domestic cricket for Wellington.
