= Chris Watmough =

English cricketer (born 1947)

Personal information
- Full name: Christine Joy Watmough
- Born: 22 March 1947 (age 79); Preston, Lancashire, England
- Batting: Left-handed
- Role: Batter

International information
- National side: England (1968–1985)
- Test debut (cap 73): 27 December 1968 v Australia
- Last Test: 12 January 1985 v Australia
- ODI debut (cap 11): 23 June 1973 v International XI
- Last ODI: 3 February 1985 v Australia

Domestic team information
- Years: Team
- 1968–1976: Kent
- 1978–1985: Surrey

Career statistics
Competition	WTest	WODI	WFC	WLA
Matches	13	28	36	60
Runs scored	397	593	1,254	1,384
Batting average	18.04	29.65	22.39	27.68
100s/50s	0/1	0/4	1/3	0/9
Top score	70	54*	108*	82
Balls bowled	191	132	404	354
Wickets	5	5	7	10
Bowling average	24.00	14.00	35.14	18.00
5 wickets in innings	0	0	0	0
10 wickets in match	0	0	0	0
Best bowling	1/2	3/28	2/28	3/28
Catches/stumpings	7/–	3/–	17/–	14/–
- Source: CricketArchive, 2 March 2021

Christine Joy Watmough (born 22 March 1947) is an English former cricketer who played primarily as a left-handed batter. She appeared in 13 Test matches and 28 One Day Internationals for England between 1968 and 1985. She was a member of the England team that won the inaugural World Cup in 1973. She played domestic cricket for Kent and Surrey.
