= Heather Dewdney =

English cricketer (born 1947)

Personal information
- Full name: Heather Mary Dewdney
- Born: 17 February 1947 (age 79); Bromley, Kent, England
- Role: Batter

International information
- National side: England (1969–1978)
- Only Test (cap 75): 25 January 1969 v Australia
- ODI debut (cap 13): 18 July 1973 v Young England
- Last ODI: 13 January 1978 v Australia

Domestic team information
- Years: Team
- 1965–1979: Kent

Career statistics
Competition	WTest	WODI	WFC	WLA
Matches	1	6	19	11
Runs scored	4	28	506	118
Batting average	2.00	9.33	19.46	14.75
100s/50s	0/0	0/0	0/1	0/1
Top score	4	20*	53	51
Balls bowled	104	0	716	0
Wickets	2	–	16	–
Bowling average	28.50	–	18.75	–
5 wickets in innings	0	–	0	–
10 wickets in match	0	–	0	–
Best bowling	1/22	–	4/21	–
Catches/stumpings	2/–	0/–	10/–	0/–
- Source: CricketArchive, 1 March 2021

Heather Mary Dewdney (born 17 February 1947) is an English former cricketer. She appeared in 1 Test match and 6 One Day Internationals for England between 1969 and 1978. She played domestic cricket for Kent.
