= Shirley Hodges =

English cricketer (born 1943)

Personal information
- Full name: Shirley Anne Hodges
- Born: 27 June 1943 (age 83); Battersea, Surrey, England
- Role: Wicket-keeper

International information
- National side: England (1969–1982)
- Test debut (cap 74): 10 January 1969 v Australia
- Last Test: 1 July 1979 v West Indies
- ODI debut (cap 6): 23 June 1973 v International XI
- Last ODI: 7 February 1982 v Australia

Domestic team information
- Years: Team
- 1962–1984: Sussex

Career statistics
Competition	WTest	WODI	WFC	WLA
Matches	11	26	32	42
Runs scored	98	34	269	176
Batting average	19.60	–	24.45	29.33
100s/50s	0/0	0/0	0/0	0/0
Top score	34*	26*	40	36*
Balls bowled	0	0	30	1
Wickets	–	–	1	0
Bowling average	–	–	8.00	–
5 wickets in innings	–	–	0	–
10 wickets in match	–	–	0	–
Best bowling	–	–	1/8	–
Catches/stumpings	19/17	20/15	44/52	28/18
- Source: CricketArchive, 1 March 2021

Shirley Anne Hodges (born 27 June 1943) is an English former cricketer who played as a wicket-keeper. She appeared in 11 Test matches and 26 One Day Internationals for England between 1969 and 1982. Her final WODI appearance was in the final of the 1982 Women's Cricket World Cup.

She played domestic cricket for Sussex. She also taught PE at Mountfield Road Secondary School in Lewes and at Hastings High School for Girls, Hastings.
