= Shirley Cowles =

New Zealand cricketer (1939–2020)

Shirley Cowles MNZM
Personal information
- Full name: Shirley Dawn Cowles
- Born: 26 April 1939; Christchurch, New Zealand
- Died: 5 March 2020 (aged 80); Christchurch, New Zealand
- Batting: Right-handed
- Bowling: Right-arm medium
- Role: Batter

International information
- National side: New Zealand (1969–1977)
- Test debut (cap 56): 7 March 1969 v England
- Last Test: 8 January 1977 v India
- ODI debut (cap 4): 23 June 1973 v Trinidad and Tobago
- Last ODI: 21 July 1973 v Young England

Domestic team information
- Years: Team
- 1953/54–1977/78: Canterbury

Career statistics
Competition	WTest	WODI	WFC
Matches	7	5	57
Runs scored	324	93	2,351
Batting average	23.14	18.60	27.65
100s/50s	0/0	0/0	2/12
Top score	46	46	122
Balls bowled	48	30	492
Wickets	0	0	10
Bowling average	–	–	20.00
5 wickets in innings	0	0	0
10 wickets in match	0	0	0
Best bowling	–	–	3/7
Catches/stumpings	6/–	2/–	45/2
- Source: CricketArchive, 15 November 2021

Shirley Dawn Cowles MNZM (née McCaw; 26 April 1939 – 5 March 2020) was a New Zealand cricketer who played as a right-handed batter and occasional wicket-keeper. She appeared in 7 Test matches and 5 One Day Internationals for New Zealand between 1969 and 1977. She played domestic cricket for Canterbury. In the 2003 New Year Honours, Cowles was appointed a Member of the New Zealand Order of Merit, for services to women's cricket.
