= Jill Need =

Australian cricketer and professor

Personal information
- Full name: Jillian Need
- Born: 11 March 1944; Adelaide, South Australia
- Died: 8 March 1997 (aged 52); Hawthorn, Adelaide, South Australia
- Batting: Right-handed
- Bowling: Right-arm medium
- Role: Bowler

International information
- National side: Australia (1968–1969)
- Test debut (cap 67): 27 December 1968 v England
- Last Test: 10 January 1969 v England

Domestic team information
- Years: Team
- 1962/63–1979/80: South Australia
- 1973–1975: Yorkshire

Career statistics
Competition	WTest	WFC	WLA
Matches	2	33	8
Runs scored	4	884	125
Batting average	4.00	19.21	15.62
100s/50s	0/0	0/1	0/0
Top score	4	71	31
Balls bowled	216	2,614	462
Wickets	0	55	14
Bowling average	–	17.85	18.28
5 wickets in innings	0	2	0
10 wickets in match	0	0	0
Best bowling	–	6/32	4/23
Catches/stumpings	0/–	6/–	1/–
- Source: CricketArchive, 17 November 2023

Jillian Need (11 March 1944 – 8 March 1997) was an Australian cricketer, cricket coach and associate professor of gynaecology and obstetrics. In cricket, she played primarily as a right-arm medium bowler. She appeared in two Test matches for Australia in 1968 and 1969. She played domestic cricket for South Australia and Yorkshire.

In the 1979–80 season, Need coached South Australia to their first Australian Women's Cricket Championships title since 1951–52.

The Jill Need Breast Cancer Clinic was named in her honour by the Flinders Medical Centre in Bedford Park, South Australia, after her death.
