= Joyce Dalton =

Australian cricketer (1933–2016)

Personal information
- Born: 20 May 1933; Gayndah, Queensland
- Died: 16 December 2016 (aged 83)
- Batting: Right-handed
- Bowling: Right Arm medium pace

International information
- National side: Australia
- Test debut (cap 47): 21 February 1958 v England
- Last Test: 21 March 1958 v England

Career statistics
| Competition | WTest |
|---|---|
| Matches | 3 |
| Runs scored | 104 |
| Batting average | 34.66 |
| 100s/50s | 0/1 |
| Top score | 59* |
| Balls bowled |
| Wickets |
| Bowling average |
| 5 wickets in innings | – |
| 10 wickets in match | – |
| Best bowling | – |
| Catches/stumpings | 0/- |
- Source: CricInfo, 8 March 2015

Joyce Dalton (20 May 1933 – 16 December 2016) was an Australian cricketer. Dalton played three Tests for the Australia national women's cricket team, all in 1958 and all against England.

Dalton played for New South Wales in domestic cricket, save for a period when she was resident in New Zealand where she played for Canterbury and Wellington

Dalton was born in Gayndah, Queensland. She died in 2016, aged 83.
