= Margaret Wilson (cricketer) =

Australian cricketer (born 1946)

Personal information
- Full name: Margaret Wilson
- Born: 25 June 1946 (age 80); Auburn, Sydney, Australia
- Batting: Right-handed
- Bowling: Right-arm medium
- Role: Bowler

International information
- National side: Australia (1969)
- Only Test (cap 68): 25 January 1969 v England

Domestic team information
- Years: Team
- 1965/66–1970/71: New South Wales

Career statistics
Competition	WTest	WFC
Matches	1	15
Runs scored	0	257
Batting average	0.00	13.52
100s/50s	0/0	0/1
Top score	0	52
Balls bowled	40	1,459
Wickets	0	16
Bowling average	–	31.62
5 wickets in innings	0	0
10 wickets in match	0	0
Best bowling	–	4/52
Catches/stumpings	1/–	8/–
- Source: CricketArchive, 17 November 2023

Margaret Wilson (born 25 June 1946) is an Australian former cricketer who played as a right-arm medium bowler. She appeared in one Test match for Australia in 1969. She played domestic cricket for New South Wales.
