= Jean Clark (cricketer) =

English cricketer (1936–1970)

Personal information
- Full name: Jean Edith Clark
- Born: 26 September 1936; London, England
- Died: 25 November 1970 (aged 34); City of London, England
- Role: Bowler

International information
- National side: England (1968)
- Only Test (cap 71): 27 December 1968 v Australia

Domestic team information
- Years: Team
- 1955–1968: Kent

Career statistics
Competition	WTest	WFC
Matches	1	17
Runs scored	7	221
Batting average	3.50	12.27
100s/50s	0/0	0/0
Top score	7	39
Balls bowled	128	1,278
Wickets	0	9
Bowling average	–	50.66
5 wickets in innings	0	0
10 wickets in match	0	0
Best bowling	–	2/24
Catches/stumpings	0/–	1/–
- Source: CricketArchive, 3 March 2021

Jean Edith Clark (26 September 1936 – 25 November 1970) was an English cricketer who played primarily as a bowler. She appeared in one Test match for England, against Australia in 1968. Clark played domestic cricket for Kent.
