= Barton Oval =

Cricket ground in North Adelaide, South Australia

Coordinates: 34°54′07″S 138°35′29″E

Ground information
- Location: North Adelaide, South Australia
- Establishment: 1968 (first recorded match)

International information
- Only women's Test: 27 December 1968: Australia v England
- As of 16 October 2020; Source: Ground profile

The Barton Oval, also known as "Barton Terrace Ovals", is a cricket ground in North Adelaide in the Australian state of South Australia. The first recorded match on the ground was in the 1968 season.

It located within the Adelaide Park Lands within a park known as "Denise Norton Park / Pardipardinyilla" and consists of two ovals, i.e. "East Oval" and "West Oval."

It hosted Women's Test matches between Australia and England.

== See also ==
- List of cricket grounds in Australia
