= Lynne Thomas (cricketer) =

Welsh/English cricketer (born 1939)

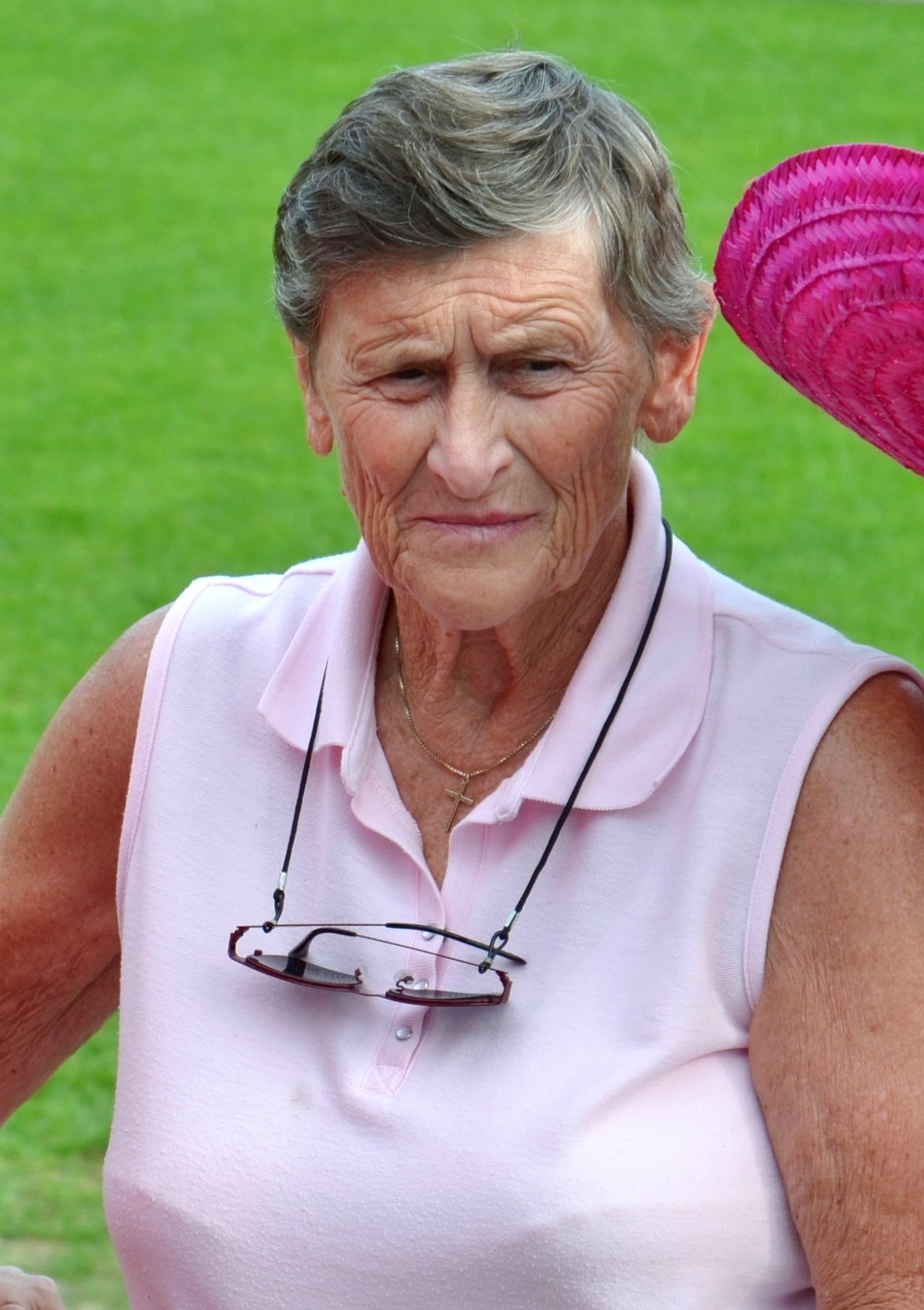
- Thomas in 2017

Personal information
- Full name: Derryth Lynne Thomas
- Born: 29 September 1939 (age 87); Llanelli, Carmarthenshire, Wales
- Batting: Right-handed
- Bowling: Right-arm off break
- Role: All-rounder

International information
- National sides: England (1966–1979); International XI (1982)
- Test debut (cap 68): 9 July 1966; England v New Zealand
- Last Test: 24 July 1976; England v Australia
- ODI debut (cap 10/24): 23 June 1973; England v International XI
- Last ODI: 6 February 1982; International XI v India

Domestic team information
- Years: Team
- 1966–1986: West

Career statistics
Competition	WTest	WODI	WFC	WLA
Matches	10	24	34	32
Runs scored	610	821	2,282	1,046
Batting average	40.66	45.61	49.60	41.84
100s/50s	0/5	1/3	2/18	2/3
Top score	90	134	133*	134
Balls bowled	880	318	3,206	446
Wickets	7	6	43	8
Bowling average	44.28	27.66	28.32	26.50
5 wickets in innings	0	0	0	0
10 wickets in match	0	0	0	0
Best bowling	3/33	2/15	4/22	2/15
Catches/stumpings	4/–	4/–	21/–	6/–
- Source: CricketArchive, 4 March 2021

Derryth Lynne Thomas (born 29 September 1939) is a Welsh former cricketer who played as a right-handed batter and right-arm off break bowler. She appeared in 10 Test matches and 12 One Day Internationals for England between 1966 and 1979. She also played 12 matches for, and was captain of, International XI at the 1982 World Cup. She played domestic cricket for West of England.

She opened the batting for England when they won the 1973 World Cup, and, against International XI in England's opening game of the tournament, became the first woman to score a century in one-day international cricket. In the same match, along with Enid Bakewell, Thomas set the record for the highest opening partnership in Women's Cricket World Cup history (246).

She also played hockey at international level for Wales. She was a full-time P.E. teacher at Neath Girls' Grammar School.
