= Brian Disbury (cricketer) =

English cricketer

Personal information
- Full name: Brian Elvin Disbury
- Born: 30 September 1929; Bedford, Bedfordshire, England
- Died: April 2016 (aged 86); Oro Valley, Arizona, U.S.
- Batting: Right-handed
- Bowling: Right-arm medium
- Relatives: Audrey Disbury (sister)

Domestic team information
- Years: Team
- 1946–1953: Bedfordshire
- 1954–1957: Kent

Career statistics
| Competition | First-class |
|---|---|
| Matches | 14 |
| Runs scored | 288 |
| Batting average | 16.00 |
| 100s/50s | 0/1 |
| Top score | 74* |
| Balls bowled | 252 |
| Wickets | 5 |
| Bowling average | 40.80 |
| 5 wickets in innings | 0 |
| 10 wickets in match | 0 |
| Best bowling | 2/76 |
| Catches/stumpings | 11/– |
- Source: CricInfo, 5 February 2012

Brian Elvin Disbury (30 September 1929 – April 2016) was an English cricketer. He was a right-handed batsman who bowled right-arm medium pace. He was born at Bedford in Bedfordshire, and was educated at Bedford School.

== Cricket career ==
Disbury made his debut in county cricket for Bedfordshire County Cricket Club against Oxfordshire in the 1946 Minor Counties Championship whilst still at school. He played for Bedfordshire from 1946 to 1953, making a total of 36 appearances. He scored four centuries and 23 half-centuries for the county and, with George August, set the county's record for the first-wicket twice in six days in 1947, scoring 235 against Cambridgeshire and then 246 against Buckinghamshire.

After playing for the Public Schools against Combined Services in 1948, Disbury played for both Combined Services and the RAF whilst on National Service. His performances brought him to the attention of Kent County Cricket Club.

Disbury joined Kent in 1954, starting well for the Second XI before making his first-class cricket debut in the 1954 County Championship against Sussex. An effective opening batsman for the Second XI, he was less successful for the First XI and he "never managed to bridge the gulf" between the levels. He played a total of 14 times for Kent in first-class cricket, with his last match coming against Somerset in the 1957 County Championship.

He scored a total of 288 runs but only managed to pass 20 three times, with a high score of 74 not out, his only half century, being scored in three hours against Leicestershire at Tunbridge Wells in 1956. Disbury took 5 wickets with his medium pace bowling with best figures of 2/76. He left the Kent staff at the end of the 1957 season, although he played a few Second XI matches in 1958 and 1959 as an amateur and won his Second XI cap in 1955.

== Later life ==
Disbury qualified as a chartered accountant and emigrated to the United States in 1960. After a long marriage to Margaret Rose Disbury, during which they lived in Africa and other international places, Brian and Maggie settled in Arizona. His sister, Audrey Disbury, played 10 Women's Test matches for England women.

He died in 2016 in Oro Valley, Arizona in the United States at the age of 86.
