= Mary Pilling =

English cricketer (born 1938)

Personal information
- Full name: Mary Pilling
- Born: 14 December 1938 (age 87); Cheadle Hulme, Cheshire, England
- Bowling: Right-arm medium
- Role: Bowler

International information
- National side: England (1963–1978)
- Test debut (cap 63): 15 June 1963 v Australia
- Last Test: 19 June 1976 v Australia
- ODI debut (cap 8): 23 June 1973 v International XI
- Last ODI: 13 January 1978 v Australia

Domestic team information
- Years: Team
- 1959–1983: Kent

Career statistics
Competition	WTest	WODI	WFC	WLA
Matches	11	9	33	20
Runs scored	43	11	197	105
Batting average	7.16	5.50	11.58	11.66
100s/50s	0/0	0/0	0/0	0/0
Top score	17*	8	27	41
Balls bowled	1,947	456	4,180	1,003
Wickets	18	10	54	24
Bowling average	38.33	14.00	29.35	15.29
5 wickets in innings	0	0	0	0
10 wickets in match	0	–	–	–
Best bowling	4/53	2/6	4/21	3/14
Catches/stumpings	4/–	5/–	16/–	8/–
- Source: CricketArchive, 6 March 2021

Mary Pilling (born 14 December 1938) is an English former cricketer who played primarily as a right-arm pace bowler. She appeared in 11 Test matches and 9 One Day Internationals for England between 1963 and 1978, and captained England at the 1978 World Cup. She played domestic cricket for Kent.
