= Sheila Plant =

English cricketer

Personal information
- Full name: Sheila Margaret Plant
- Born: 19 February 1936 (age 90); Birmingham, England
- Batting: Right-handed
- Role: Wicket-keeper

International information
- National side: England (1960–1968)
- Test debut (cap 54): 2 December 1960 v South Africa
- Last Test: 27 December 1968 v Australia

Domestic team information
- Years: Team
- 1955–1974: Surrey

Career statistics
Competition	WTest	WFC
Matches	8	19
Runs scored	106	308
Batting average	10.60	17.11
100s/50s	0/0	0/2
Top score	46	59*
Balls bowled	306	506
Wickets	5	9
Bowling average	14.60	15.33
5 wickets in innings	0	0
10 wickets in match	0	0
Best bowling	2/11	2/11
Catches/stumpings	4/1	21/15
- Source: CricketArchive, 7 March 2021

Sheila Margaret Plant (born 19 February 1936) is an English former cricketer who played primarily as a right-handed batter and wicket-keeper. She appeared in 9 Test matches for England between 1960 and 1968. She played domestic cricket for Surrey. She was the head of Croydon High School's PE Department from 1963 to 1992, and was given leave of absence for the England cricket team's extended tour of Australia and New Zealand in 1968/9.

It is customary to award a ceremonial numbered Cricket cap to cricketers who represent international sides, but women were not awarded caps until the custom was changed with reforms to women's cricket in 1998. She eventually received England Cap number 54 (as the 54th woman recipient) in 2024.
