= June Stephenson =

English cricketer (born 1943)

Personal information
- Full name: June Stephenson
- Born: 30 January 1943 (age 83); Bradford, Yorkshire, England
- Bowling: Right-arm medium
- Role: All-rounder

International information
- National side: England (1966–1976)
- Test debut (cap 66): 18 June 1966 v New Zealand
- Last Test: 24 July 1976 v Australia
- ODI debut (cap 9): 23 June 1973 v International XI
- Last ODI: 8 August 1976 v Australia

Domestic team information
- Years: Team
- 1963–1982: Yorkshire

Career statistics
Competition	WTest	WODI	WFC	WLA
Matches	12	9	25	12
Runs scored	345	60	752	128
Batting average	26.53	15.00	28.92	18.28
100s/50s	0/3	0/0	0/6	0/1
Top score	60*	37	90	52
Balls bowled	1,928	430	3,452	592
Wickets	18	10	38	13
Bowling average	30.72	16.90	24.94	18.23
5 wickets in innings	0	0	0	0
10 wickets in match	0	–	–	–
Best bowling	4/38	3/4	4/23	3/4
Catches/stumpings	8/–	5/–	20/–	7/–
- Source: CricketArchive, 5 March 2021

June Stephenson (née Moorhouse; born 30 January 1943) is an English former cricketer who played as a lower-order batter and right-arm medium bowler. She appeared in 12 Test matches and 9 One Day Internationals for England between 1966 and 1976. She played domestic cricket for Yorkshire.
