= Audrey Disbury =

English cricketer

Personal information
- Full name: Audrey Delph Disbury
- Born: 5 March 1934; Bedford, Bedfordshire, England
- Died: 17 June 2016 (aged 82); Ashford, Kent, England
- Batting: Right-handed
- Bowling: Right-arm off-break
- Role: Batter
- Relatives: Brian Disbury (brother)

International information
- National sides: England (1957–1969); International XI (1973)
- Test debut (cap 44): 29 November 1957; England v New Zealand
- Last Test: 28 March 1969; England v New Zealand
- ODI debut (cap 3): 23 June 1973; International XI v England
- Last ODI: 21 July 1973; International XI v Australia

Domestic team information
- Years: Team
- 1956–1957: West
- 1961–1971: Kent

Career statistics
Competition	WTest	WODI	WFC	WLA
Matches	10	6	44	8
Runs scored	391	100	1,430	164
Batting average	24.43	20.00	26.48	23.42
100s/50s	0/0	0/0	2/6	0/1
Top score	47	44	119	64
Balls bowled	340	–	1,702	–
Wickets	2	–	29	–
Bowling average	65.00	–	23.41	–
5 wickets in innings	0	–	1	–
10 wickets in match	0	–	0	–
Best bowling	1/13	–	5/64	–
Catches/stumpings	4/–	0/–	20/–	20/–
- Source: CricketArchive, 8 March 2021

Audrey Delph Disbury (5 March 1934 – 17 June 2016) was an English cricketer who played primarily as a right-handed batter. She appeared in 10 Test matches for England between 1957 and 1969, as well as playing in 6 One Day Internationals, as captain, for International XI at the 1973 World Cup. She played domestic cricket for West of England and Kent, and served in the Women's Royal Naval Service (WRNS).

== Early life and naval career ==
Disbury was born in Bedford and educated at Bedford High School. Her family owned a bakery but after training as a nurse at the Radcliffe Infirmary in Oxford she joined the Women's Royal Naval Service (WRNS). She served as an Air Mechanic with the Fleet Air Arm at Lee-on-Solent before being promoted to Petty Officer and transferring to Chatham Dockyard.

== Cricket career ==
Whilst at Chatham, Disbury first played for Kent Women cricket team, making a total of 22 appearances for the county team, eventually serving as captain. She played for a variety of other teams throughout a career which lasted from 1954 to 1976.

She toured Australia, New Zealand and South Africa with England. She played 10 Test matches between 1957/58 and 1968/69 and was the first member of the WRNS to play for the national team. She also made six one-day appearances for the International XI women's cricket team, captaining the team at the 1973 World Cup. She was a "hard hitting" opening batsman and bowled off-breaks. She later served as a Test match selector for England.

== Later life ==
After leaving the WRNS, she lived in Ashford and ran a guest house with her partner. She played contract bridge and golf, captaining Kent County Golf Association in 1996–1997, and was President of the association between 2012 and 2014. She died at Ashford in June 2016 aged 82. Her brother Brian played county cricket for Kent.
