= Rachael Heyhoe Flint =

English female cricketer, businesswoman and life peer

The Right Honourable The Baroness Heyhoe Flint OBE DL
- In the House of Lords in 2015

Personal information
- Full name: Rachael Heyhoe Flint
- Born: 11 June 1939; Wolverhampton, England
- Died: 18 January 2017 (aged 77)
- Batting: Right-handed
- Bowling: Right-arm leg break
- Role: Batter

International information
- National side: England (1960–1982)
- Test debut (cap 51): 2 December 1960 v South Africa
- Last Test: 1 July 1979 v West Indies
- ODI debut (cap 4): 23 June 1973 v International XI
- Last ODI: 7 February 1982 v Australia

Domestic team information
- Years: Team
- 1963–1985: West Midlands
- 1976–1982: West

Career statistics
Competition	WTest	WODI	WFC	WLA
Matches	22	23	51	43
Runs scored	1,594	643	3,356	1,110
Batting average	45.54	58.45	46.61	42.69
100s/50s	3/10	1/4	8/18	1/8
Top score	179	114	179	114
Balls bowled	402	18	870	64
Wickets	3	1	7	5
Bowling average	68.00	20.00	66.42	7.80
5 wickets in innings	0	0	0	0
10 wickets in match	0	0	0	0
Best bowling	1/3	1/13	2/29	2/16
Catches/stumpings	13/–	6/–	30/–	12/–
- Source: CricketArchive, 7 March 2021

Member of the House of Lords
- Lord Temporal
- Life peerage 21 January 2011 – 18 January 2017

Rachael Heyhoe Flint, Baroness Heyhoe Flint, OBE, DL (née Heyhoe; 11 June 1939 – 18 January 2017) was an English cricketer, businesswoman, and philanthropist. She was best known for being captain of England from 1966 to 1978, and was unbeaten in six Test series: in total, she played for the English women's cricket team from 1960 to 1982. Heyhoe Flint was captain when her team won the inaugural 1973 Women's Cricket World Cup, which England hosted. She was also the first female cricketer to hit a six in a Test match, and one of the first ten women to become a member of the MCC.

She also played as goalkeeper for the England national hockey team in 1964.

According to Scyld Berry: "She was, among other achievements, the Dr WG Grace of women's cricket – the pioneer without whom the game would not be what it is."

== Early life ==
Rachael Heyhoe was born in Wolverhampton. Her parents Roma Crocker and Geoffrey Heyhoe were teachers of physical education who met at a college in Denmark. They both taught in Wolverhampton.

She was educated at Wolverhampton Girls' High School from 1950 to 1957, and then attended Dartford College of Physical Education (then became a part of University of Greenwich) until 1960.

She became a teacher of physical education from 1960 to 1963, at Wolverhampton Municipal Grammar School and then Northicote School also in Wolverhampton. She then became a journalist with the Wolverhampton Chronicle. She was a sports writer on a freelance basis for the Daily Telegraph and the Sunday Telegraph. She also worked as a broadcaster, and in 1973 she was appointed TV's first woman sports presenter with ITV's World of Sport. After retiring from cricket, she continued to work as a journalist and broadcaster and also became an award-winning after-dinner speaker, businesswoman and board director.

== Cricket career ==
Heyhoe Flint was chiefly a right-handed batter, and occasional leg spin bowler. She played in 22 Women's Test cricket matches from 1960 to 1979, with a batting average of 45.54 in 38 innings. She took 3 Test wickets and scored three Test centuries, including her highest score of 179 not out, a world record when she scored it in 1976 also against Australia at the Oval, earning a draw to save the series by batting for more than 8½ hours. She also played in 23 Women's One Day Internationals (WODIs), with a batting average of 58.45 and a top score of 114. She was captain of the England women's cricket team for 12 years, 1966 to 1978; while the captain, she never lost a match.

She hit the first six in a women's Test match in 1963, at the Oval against Australia. She was instrumental in the effort to hold the first Women's World Cup, securing funding from her friend Jack Hayward. She captained the England team in the tournament, and scored a half-century in the final, which England won against Australia at Edgbaston on 28 July 1973. The women led the men: first men's Cricket World Cup was not held for another two years.

In 1970 she was one of those who set up a fund to pay for police protection for the planned South African tour. and she was one of the many who argued that sport and politics should be kept separate. Unequivocally in her 1978 autobiography she said "Who are we... to tell the South Africans how to run their country?" It was, she said, "... their country, and hardly the place of any English people to criticise". This was also the position of the British Women's Cricket Association in which she played a leading part.

She was captain of the first England women's team to play at Lord's in the 1976 Women's Ashes series. After being replaced as England captain in 1978, she played her last Test match in the 1979 series against the West Indies, but went on to play in the 1982 World Cup. Her final WODI appearance was in the final of the 1982 Women's Cricket World Cup.

She primarily played domestic cricket for West Midlands, whilst also making appearances for West of England, East Midlands, Warwickshire and various composite XIs.

== Cricket Honours & Legacy ==
She originally applied for membership of the Marylebone Cricket Club (MCC), when the club was male-only, under the name R. Flint (so the MCC would assume it was a man). But when she was offered membership, the MCC committee voted to reject her application. However, a few years later in 1998, they opened membership up to women. Heyhoe Flint was one of the first ten women admitted to the MCC in 1999, as an honorary life member. In 2004, she was the first woman elected to the full committee of the MCC and latterly became a Trustee.

In October 2010 was inducted into the ICC Cricket Hall of Fame, the first woman to achieve this accolade. and the same year became one of the first female directors of the England and Wales Cricket Board.

Upon her death in 2017, in her memory, the International Cricket Council named their ICC Women's Cricketer of the Year accolade, the Rachael Heyhoe Flint Award. In 2020, the women's ECB domestic 50-over competition was named the Rachael Heyhoe Flint Trophy.

In 2018, Malvern College in Worcestershire announced a Heyhoe Flint Scholarship to partially fund the education of talented girl cricketers at the College. The scholarship was kickstarted by donations received by her son Ben at the time of her death (who attended Malvern in the 80s/90s) who then conceived the idea with Headmaster Antony Clark. The Malvernian Society has since perpetuated the scholarship. Heyhoe Flint was on the Board of Governers at Malvern College for almost 10 years until 2008.

In 2021, the MCC announced it would honour Heyhoe Flint's achievements in the sport by renaming the East gate at Lord's after her. This was formally opened by her son Ben, along with her protégée Clare Connor, the MCC president, during the August 2022 Men's test match against South Africa. The gate was opened 100 years after the Grace Gate, which honoured the founding father of the men's game, WG Grace.

Some of her playing memorabilia has been gifted to the MCC Museum by the Heyhoe Flint family, including unseen personal video footage of the 1973 Women's World Cup.

== Other sports ==
She played as goalkeeper for the England national field hockey team in 1964 and was a single-figure handicap golfer. She played hockey, squash and golf for Staffordshire.

She was made a director of Wolverhampton Wanderers F.C. in 1997 to 2003, later becoming an ex officio Vice-president.

== Other Honours ==
She was appointed Member of the Order of the British Empire (MBE) in 1972. and then appointed Officer of the Order of the British Empire (OBE) in the 2008 New Year Honours,

She was appointed a Deputy Lieutenant of the West Midlands in 1997, and was President of the Lady Taverners charity from 2001 to 2011.

On 19 November 2010, it was announced that she was to be ennobled to sit in the House of Lords as a Conservative Party peer. "I was completely taken by surprise when I took the call from the Prime Minister in September", Heyhoe Flint said. "Obviously I am really thrilled at my appointment but still very humbled at the thought of joining such a historic institution ... My background in sport, journalism, charity and community work will I hope stand me in good stead, and I hope I can make a positive contribution as a working peer. I will certainly look forward to the commute from one Lord's to another Lords." She was subsequently invested as a life peer on 21 January 2011 taking the title Baroness Heyhoe Flint, of Wolverhampton in the County of West Midlands. The formal designation of her title without a hyphen broke a rule that peerage titles could only have one word, previously observed by the likes of Lord Lloyd-George, Lord Alanbrooke, Lord Chuter-Ede and Lord Lloyd-Webber.

In April 2011, Heyhoe Flint was granted the freedom of Wolverhampton.

== Personal life ==
On 1 November 1971, Rachael Heyhoe married Derrick Flint (1924–2018). Her husband had a first-class cricket career comprising 10 matches for Warwickshire CCC in 1948–1949 playing as a leg-spin and googly bowler. She adopted a double-barrelled surname, becoming Rachael Heyhoe Flint.

Their son Ben (born 1974) also played cricket. He emigrated to Singapore in 2001-2023 where he ran businesses related to sports and entertainment. He is a MCC Life Member and continues the Heyhoe Flint legacy.

Heyhoe Flint was also stepmother to Derrick's children: Simon, Hazel and Rowan.

== Death ==
Her death, after a short illness, was announced by Lord's on 18 January 2017.

She was remembered during the in memoriam at the 2017 BBC Sports Personality of the Year Awards and a minute's silence was held at the start of the 2017 Women's World Cup Final, with her image displayed on the electronic scoreboards.

== Bibliography ==
With Netta Rheinberg, she co-authored a history of women's cricket: Fair Play: The Story of Women's Cricket, Angus & Robertson, 1976, (ISBN 978-0-207-95698-0). She also wrote an instructional guide to field hockey called, Rachael Heyhoe Flint: Field Hockey with Barron's Sports Books (ISBN 978-0-8120-5158-2) in 1978. She authored her autobiography Heyhoe (ISBN 978-0-7207-1049-6) in 1978, published by Pelham Books with a foreword from comedian and cricket-lover Eric Morecambe.

== See also ==
- List of residents of Wolverhampton
